= 2023–24 Dhaka Senior Division League =

Dhaka Senior Division League
- Season: 2023–24
- Dates: 1 July–3 August 2024 (season abandoned)
- Champions: Not awarded
- Promoted: No promotion
- Relegated: No relegation
- Matches: 56
- Goals: 105 (1.88 per match)
- Highest scoring: Arambagh KS 5–1 Somaj Kallyan Mugda (28 July 2020)
- Longest winning run: Mohakhali Ekadosh (4 matches)
- Longest unbeaten run: Arambagh KS (7 matches)
- Longest winless run: T&T Club; Little Friends Club (6 matches)
- Longest losing run: Somaj Kallyan Mugda (4 matches)

The 2023–24 Dhaka Senior Division Football League also known as a Bashundhara Group Senior Division Football League due to sponsorship reasons, would have been the 7th season of the Dhaka Senior Division League since it was rebranded in 2007. A total of eighteen clubs competed in the league which began on 1 July and was suspended on 3 August 2024.

The top-four teams were bound to be promoted to the 2024–25 Championship League, given all professional league license criteria were met, while the bottom-two teams would be relegated to the 2023–24 Second Division.

Somaj Kallyan Mugda and Jatrabari KC, the previous season's champions and runners-up both failed to attain professional league license, instead third place, PWD SC were promoted to the 2023–24 Championship League.

Following multiple stops and starts, the league was suspended on 3 August 2024, following the completion of two Round 7 matches due to the political turmoil caused by the 2024 Bangladesh quota reform movement. The league was declared void following a BFF executive meeting on 11 December 2024.

== Venue ==
All matches of the league being played at these ground.

Dhaka	Dhaka is located in Bangladesh
BSSS Mostafa Kamal Stadium	Dhaka is located in Bangladesh
Capacity: 25,000	Dhaka is located in Bangladesh

== Teams ==
The following eighteen clubs are participating in the league.

Team	Head coach	Captain
Arambagh KS	(Bangladesh) Ekramul Rahman	(Bangladesh) Krishno Mali
Arambagh FA	(Bangladesh) Muhammad Ashraful Haque	(Bangladesh) Muhammad Sharif Mia
Badda Jagorani	(Bangladesh) Sayeed Hassan Kanan	(Bangladesh) Md Muntasir Rahman
Bangladesh Boys	(Bangladesh) Md Harun	(Bangladesh) Md Shamim Mia
Basabo TS	(Bangladesh) Abu Ahmed Faysal	(Bangladesh) Md Minhaz Hossain
Jatrabari KC	(Bangladesh) Imtiaz Khan Lablu	(Bangladesh) Md Ariful Islam
Jatrabari JS	(Bangladesh) Arman Hossain	(Bangladesh) Raj Uddin
Somaj Kallyan Mugda	(Bangladesh) Suopn Barua	(Bangladesh) Md Rayhan Mia
Little Friends Club	(Bangladesh) Rinku Chakma	(Bangladesh) Dipo Rajbongshi
Kashaituly SKP	(Bangladesh) Tuhin Kumar Dey	(Bangladesh) Rafael Mardi
Mohakhali Ekadosh	(Bangladesh) Md Shofikul Hasan Polash	(Bangladesh) Md Imran Islam Anu
Nobabpur KC	(Bangladesh) Monowar Hossain	(Bangladesh) Md Toriqul Islam Julfikar
East End	(Bangladesh) Md Shahdat Hossain	(Bangladesh) Md Shawon Ali
Sadharan Bima	(Bangladesh) Md Masud Alam Jahangir	(Bangladesh) Md Golam Sarwar
Siddique Bazar Dhaka JSC	(Bangladesh) Md Murad Ahmed Milon	(Bangladesh) Riaz Khalifa
Uttar Baridhara	(Bangladesh) Md Mahabub Ali Manik	(Bangladesh) Faisal Ahmed Shitol
Swadhinata KS	(Bangladesh) Kamal Babu	(Bangladesh) Md Alif Nur
T&T Club	(Bangladesh) Robiul Hasan Khan Mona	(Bangladesh) Md Sazzad Hossain

== League table ==
Pos	Team	Pld	W	D	L	GF	GA	GD	Pts	Qualification or relegation
1	Arambagh KS	7	4	3	0	13	3	+10	15	No promotion (Note: There was no promotion or relegation as the season was abandoned due to the outbreak of 2024 Bangladesh quota reform movement.)
2	Arambagh FA	6	4	2	0	9	3	+6	14	No promotion
3	Jatrabari JS	7	4	1	2	10	4	+6	13	No promotion
4	Mohakhali Ekadosh	6	4	0	2	8	5	+3	12	No promotion
5	East End	7	2	5	0	4	1	+3	11	
6	Kashaituly SKP	6	3	2	1	8	6	+2	11	
7	Uttar Baridhara	6	3	1	2	8	6	+2	10	
8	Siddique Bazar Dhaka JSC	6	2	3	1	10	5	+5	9	
9	Jatrabari KC	6	2	2	2	3	3	0	8	
10	Badda Jagoroni	6	1	4	1	4	2	+2	7	
11	Nobabpur KC	6	1	4	1	4	4	0	7	
12	Bangladesh Boys	6	1	4	1	3	3	0	7	
13	Basabo TS	6	1	2	3	3	6	−3	5	
14	Sadharan Bima	6	1	2	3	4	8	−4	5	
15	Swadhinata KS	6	1	2	3	3	9	−6	5	
16	T&T Club	6	0	3	3	4	8	−4	3	
17	Somaj Kallyan Mugda	7	1	0	6	4	14	−10	3	No relegation
18	Little Friends	6	0	2	4	3	15	−12	2	No relegation

Source: BFF
Rules for classification: 1) Points; 2) Goal difference; 3) Goals scored;

== Results ==
No Home\No Away	SBDJSC	UBC	LFC	BBC	KSKP	NKS	EEC	SKKSM	BTS	MXI	SBCSC	BJS	JKC	AKS	AFA	SKS	JJS	T&T
Siddique Bazar Dhaka JSC	—				2–2			2–0								1–1		
Uttar Baridhara		—													1–1			2–1
Little Friends			—											1–1	0–2			
Bangladesh Boys				—		0–0					2–2	1–0						
Kashaituly SKP					—		1–1		1–2								1–0	
Nobabpur KC					1–2	—	0–0			2–1								
East End				0–0			—					0–0	0–0					
Somaj Kallyan Mugda							0–1	—	2–0						0–2		1–2	
Basabo TS			1–1						—			0–0	0–1					
Mohakhali Ekadosh				1–0			0–2			—								
Sadharan Bima					0–1			2–0		0–2	—							
Badda Jagoroni	1–1					0–0					3–0	—						
Jatrabari KC	1–0										0–0		—		1–2			
Arambagh KS		1–0						5–1						—		4–0	0–0	
Arambagh FA														1–1	—	1–0		
Swadhinata KS																—	1–0	
Jatrabari JS		3–0	4–1										1–0				—	
T&T Club																		—

Source: BFF
Legend: Blue = left column team win; Yellow = draw; Red = top row team win.

== Result by round ==
Team ╲ Round	1	2	3	4	5	6	7	8	9	10	11	12	13	14	15	16	17
Siddique Bazar Dhaka Junior SC	L	W	W	D	D	D											
Uttar Baridhara	W	L	D	L	W	W											
Little Friends	L	L	L	D	L	D											
Bangladesh Boys	D	D	L	W	D	D											
Kashaituly SKP	L	W	D	W	W	D											
Nobabpur KC	D	W	D	L	D	D											
East End	W	D	D	D	D	D	W										
Somaj Kallyan Mugda	L	L	W	L	L	L	L										
Basabo TS	W	L	L	D	L	D											
Mohakhali Ekadosh	L	L	W	W	W	W											
Sadharan Bima	L	L	D	W	D	L											
Badda Jagoroni	W	D	D	L	D	D											
Jatrabari KC	W	W	D	D	L	L											
Arambagh KS	W	W	W	D	W	D	D										
Arambagh FA	W	W	D	D	W	W											
Swadhinata KS	L	L	W	D	D	L											
Jatrabari JS	W	W	L	W	L	W	D										
T&T Club	L	D	L	L	D	D											

Source: BFF
W = Win; D = Draw; L = Lose

== See also ==
- 2023–24 BFF U-18 Football League
- 2023–24 BFF U-16 Football League
