= 2021–22 Dhaka Senior Division League =

Dhaka Senior Division League
- Season: 2021–22
- Dates: 10 August–26 October 2022
- Champions: Somaj Kallyan KS Mugda (1st title)
- Promoted: ~~Somaj Kallyan KS Mugda~~ ~~Jatrabari KC~~ PWD Sports Club
- Relegated: Dilkusha SC; Victoria SC
- Matches: 88
- Goals: 157 (1.78 per match)
- Top goalscorer: 9 goals Munna Biswas (Somaj Kallyan KS Mugda)
- Highest scoring: Victoria SC 4–1 Dilkusha SC; Somaj Kallyan KS Mugda 3–2 PWD SC
- Longest unbeaten run: 13 matches Somaj Kallyan KS Mugda

The 2021–22 Dhaka Senior Division Football League, also known as the Bashundhara Group Senior Division Football League for sponsorship reasons or as First Division Football League, was the 6th season of the Dhaka Senior Division League since it was rebranded in 2007. A total of 14 teams competed in the league.

Kawran Bazar Pragati Sangha were the defending champions and were promoted to the 2019–20 Bangladesh Championship League along with runners-up Dhaka Wanderers Club. Dhaka United SC were relegated to the 2021–22 Dhaka Second Division Football League, however the club did not participate in the league and were later dissolved.

== Venue ==
The opening ceremony and opening match were held at Bashundhara Kings Arena in the Bashundhara Sports Complex, Dhaka.

The rest of the matches were being played at Bir Sherestha Shaheed Shipahi Mostafa Kamal Stadium in Kamalapur, Dhaka.

Dhaka	2021–22 Dhaka Senior Division League is located in Bangladesh
BSSS Mostafa Kamal Stadium	2021–22 Dhaka Senior Division League is located in Bangladesh
Capacity: 25,000	2021–22 Dhaka Senior Division League is located in Bangladesh

== Teams ==
Arambagh KS couldn't participate in this edition of the league as FIFA imposed a transfer-ban on the club while Dhaka City FC withdrew due to unknown reason.

1. PWD Sports Club
2. Jatrabari KC
3. Mohakhali Ekadosh
4. Badda Jagoroni Sangsad
5. Bangladesh Boys Club
6. Koshaituli Somaj Kollayan Parishad
7. Somaj Kallyan KS Mugda
8. East End Club
9. Dilkusha Sporting Club
10. Nobabpur Krira Chakra
11. Basabo Tarun Sangha
12. Sadharan Bima Corporation Sporting Club
13. Friends Social Welfare Organization
14. Victoria Sporting Club

== League table ==
Pos	Team	Pld	W	D	L	GF	GA	GD	Pts	Qualification or relegation
1	Somaj Kallyan KS Mugda (Note: Somaj Kallyan KS Mugda failed to attain professional league license, thus did not enter the 2023–24 Bangladesh Championship League.) (C)	13	9	4	0	21	8	+13	31	
2	Jatrabari KC (Note: Jatrabari KC did not participate in the 2023–24 Bangladesh Championship League due to financial constraints.)	13	8	3	2	18	4	+14	27	
3	PWD SC (P)	13	7	3	3	14	5	+9	24	Qualification for the BCL 2023–24
4	Koshaituli SKP	13	6	4	3	15	8	+7	22	
5	Mohakhali Ekadosh	13	5	4	4	11	8	+3	19	
6	Badda Jagoroni	13	5	4	4	17	15	+2	19	
7	Bangladesh Boys Club	13	3	7	3	7	7	0	16	
8	Nobabpur KC	13	4	3	6	10	13	−3	15	
9	East End Club	13	4	2	7	12	17	−5	14	
10	Sadharan Bima CSC	13	3	5	5	9	15	−6	14	
11	Basabo Tarun Sangha	13	2	7	4	6	10	−4	13	
12	Friends Social WO	13	3	4	6	6	12	−6	13	
13	Victoria SC (R)	13	2	4	7	7	16	−9	10	Relegation to the Second Division League 2022–23
14	Dilkusha SC (R)	13	1	4	8	8	23	−15	7	Relegation to the Second Division League 2022–23

Source: BFF
Rules for classification: (1) Points; (2) Goal difference; (3) Goals scored;
(C) Champions; (P) Promoted; (R) Relegated

== Goalscorers ==
There were 157 goals scored in 88 matches, for an average of 1.78 goals per match.

9 goals

- (Bangladesh) Munna Biswas (Somaj Kallyan KS Mugda)

6 goals

- (Bangladesh) Azizur (Badda Jagoroni)

5 goals

- (Bangladesh) Lokkhon (East End Club)
- (Bangladesh) Elias (Koshaituli SKP)
- (Bangladesh) Nabil (Sadharan Bima CSC)
- (Bangladesh) Ariful (PWD SC)

4 goals

- (Bangladesh) Shamim (Badda Jagoroni)
- (Bangladesh) Sarwar (Somaj Kallyan KS Mugda)
- (Bangladesh) Belal (Jatrabari KC)
- (Bangladesh) Torikul (Jatrabari KC)

3 goals

- (Bangladesh) Uzzol (Jatrabari KC)
- Shohag (Bangladesh Boys Club)
- (Bangladesh) Irfan (Jatrabari KC)
- (Bangladesh) Imran (Mohakhali Ekadosh)

2 goals

- (Bangladesh) Sazzad (Victoria SC)
- (Bangladesh) Badhon (Friends Social WO)
- (Bangladesh) Sohag (Victoria SC)
- (Bangladesh) Shohidul (Dilkusha SC)
- (Bangladesh) Arif (Badda Jagoroni)
- (Bangladesh) Samrat (East End Club)
- (Bangladesh) Kounik (Mohakhali Ekadosh)
- (Bangladesh) Amin (Koshaituli SKP)
- (Bangladesh) Riaz (Victoria SC)
- (Bangladesh) Rasel (Somaj Kallyan KS Mugda)
- (Bangladesh) Abir (Koshaituli SKP)
- (Bangladesh) Jubayer (PWD SC)
- (Bangladesh) Joy (Jatrabari KC)
- (Bangladesh) Nurul Alam (Dilkusha SC)

1 goal

- (Bangladesh) Jewel (Victoria SC)
- (Bangladesh) Shawon (Dilkusha SC)
- (Bangladesh) Parvez (Somaj Kallyan KS Mugda)
- (Bangladesh) Jahidul (Jatrabari KC)
- (Bangladesh) Malek (Koshaituli SKP)
- (Bangladesh) Imran (Badda Jagoroni)
- (Bangladesh) Mohshin (Nobabpur KC)
- (Bangladesh) Robiul (Nobabpur KC)
- (Bangladesh) Hossain (Mohakhali Ekadosh)
- (Bangladesh) Saddam (Mohakhali Ekadosh)
- (Bangladesh) Khairul (Mohakhali Ekadosh)
- (Bangladesh) Sohag (Basabo Torun Shangha)
- (Bangladesh) Hasan (East End Club)
- (Bangladesh) Al Amin (Somaj Kallyan KS Mugda)
- (Bangladesh) Atik (Somaj Kallyan KS Mugda)
- (Bangladesh) Shawon (Friends Social WO)
- (Bangladesh) Monsur (Sadharan Bima CSC)
- (Bangladesh) Kholilur (Mohakhali Ekadosh)
- (Bangladesh) Ranga (Basabo Torun Shangha)
- (Bangladesh) Pappu (PWD SC)
- Hossain (Bangladesh Boys Club)
- (Bangladesh) Kholilur (Koshaituli SKP)
- (Bangladesh) Hridoy (Mohakhali Ekadosh)
- (Bangladesh) Arif (Basabo Torun Shangha)
- (Bangladesh) Rumel (Badda Jagoroni)
- (Bangladesh) Asif (PWD SC)
- (Bangladesh) Shimul (Friends Social WO)
- (Bangladesh) Moshiur (Somaj Kallyan KS Mugda)
- (Bangladesh) Sojib (Mohakhali Ekadosh)
- (Bangladesh) Minhaz (Basabo Torun Shangha)
- (Bangladesh) Riyad (Dilkusha SC)
- (Bangladesh) Tuhin (Badda Jagoroni)
- (Bangladesh) Pranto (Nobabpur KC)
- (Bangladesh) Raju (Nobabpur KC)
- (Bangladesh) Kamran (PWD SC)
- (Bangladesh) Rana (Friends Social WO)
- (Bangladesh) Iqbal (Nobabpur KC)
- (Bangladesh) Rana (East End Club)
- (Bangladesh) Hafizur (Badda Jagoroni)
- (Bangladesh) Arman (Dilkusha SC)
- (Bangladesh) Abid (Koshaituli SKP)
- (Bangladesh) Basar (Koshaituli SKP)
- (Bangladesh) Humayun (Basabo Torun Shangha)
- (Bangladesh) Mehede (Nobabpur KC)
- (Bangladesh) Rony (Badda Jagoroni)
- (Bangladesh) Khokan (Sadharan Bima CSC)
- (Bangladesh) Pronob (Koshaituli SKP)
- Shahjahan (Bangladesh Boys Club)
- (Bangladesh) Ashraful (East End Club)
- (Bangladesh) Rashed (Nobabpur KC)
- (Bangladesh) Shohanur (Nobabpur KC)
- (Bangladesh) Anowar (Sadharan Bima CSC)
- (Bangladesh) Nurul (Sadharan Bima CSC)
- (Bangladesh) Ferdous (Basabo Torun Shangha)

Unknown goalscrorers

1. Mohakhali Ekadosh 0–1 Basabo Torun Shangha match of 1 goal scorers player name unknown.
2. Dilkusha SC 0–4 PWD SC match of 4 goal scorers player name unknown.
3. Mohakhali Ekadosh 0–1 Jatrabari KC match of 1 goal scorers player name unknown.
4. Nobabpur KC 1–5 Jatrabari KC match of 1 goal scorers player of Nobabpur KC name unknown.
5. Dilkusha SC 0–1 Friends Social WO match of 1 goal scorer player name unknown.

== See also ==
- 2021–22 Bangladesh Championship League
- 2021–22 Dhaka Second Division Football League
