= 2014 Dhaka Senior Division League =

Bengal Group Dhaka Senior Division League
- Season: 2014
- Dates: 12 September – 14 December 2014
- Champions: Fakirerpool
- Promoted: Fakirerpool; Motijheel T&T
- Matches: 90
- Top goalscorer: 16 goals Rumon Hossain Rubel (Fakirerpool)
- BFF decided to start the league in 2017 again after 2014

The 2014 Dhaka Senior Division League, also known as Bengal Group Dhaka Senior Division League for sponsorship reasons, was the 56th functioning season of Dhaka's top-tier since official recognition and fourth as Bangladesh's third-tier. The league began on 12 September and concluded on 14 December 2014.

== Venues ==
- Bangabandhu National Stadium, Dhaka
- Bir Sherestha Shaheed Shipahi Mostafa Kamal Stadium, Dhaka
- Paltan Play Ground
- BUET Play Ground

== Teams ==
The following 10 clubs competed in the Dhaka Senior Division League during the 2014 season.

- Bangladesh Boys Club
- Basabo Tarun Sangha
- Dhaka Wanderers Club
- Dhaka United SC
- Fakirerpool Young Men's Club
- Friends Social Welfare Organization
- Jatrabari KC
- Mohakhali Ekadosh
- Swadhinata KS
- T&T Club Motijheel

== League table ==
Rank	Teams	Played	Won	Lost	Drawn	Points	Qualification
1	Fakirerpool	18	12	5	1	41	Promoted to the 2014–15 Championship League
2	Motijheel T&T	18	10	5	3	35	Promoted to the 2014–15 Championship League
3	Jatrabari	18	9	7	2	34	
4	Basabo TS	18	8	8	2	32	
5	Dhaka Wanderers	18	6	6	6	24	
6	Mohakhali Ekadosh	18	5	9	4	24	
7	Dhaka United	18	3	8	7	17	
8	Friends SWO	18	3	5	10	14	
9	Swadhinata KS	18	2	5	11	11	
10	Bangladesh Boys	18	1	4	13	7	
