= 2017 Dhaka Senior Division League =

Saif Powertec Dhaka Senior Division League
- Dates: 31 March – 22 May 2017
- Champions: Swadhinata KS
- Promoted: Swadhinata KS; Wari Club
- Relegated: No relegation
- Matches: 66
- Goals: 124 (1.88 per match)
- All statistics correct as of 11 July 2019.

The 2017 Dhaka Senior Division Football League, also known as Saif Powertec Senior Division Football League due to sponsorship reasons, was the 57th functioning season since official recognition and 5th season as Bangladesh's third-tier. A total of 12 teams participated in the league, which ran from 31 March to 22 May 2017.

== Venue ==
All matches were held at the BSSS Mostafa Kamal Stadium in Dhaka, Bangladesh.

Dhaka	2017 Dhaka Senior Division League is located in Bangladesh
BSSS Mostafa Kamal Stadium	2017 Dhaka Senior Division League is located in Bangladesh
Capacity: 25,000	2017 Dhaka Senior Division League is located in Bangladesh

== Teams ==
The following 12 clubs competed in the Dhaka Senior Division League during the 2017 season.

- Bangladesh Boys Club
- Basabo Tarun Sangha
- Dhaka Wanderers Club
- Dhaka United SC
- Badda Jagoroni Sangsad
- PWD Sports Club
- Sadharan Bima CSC
- Friends SWO
- Jatrabari KC
- Mohakhali Ekadosh
- Swadhinata KS
- Wari Club

=== League table ===
Pos	Team	Pld	W	D	L	GF	GA	GD	Pts	Qualification or relegation
1	Swadhinata KS (C)	11	7	3	1	18	6	+12	24	Promoted to 2018–19 Bangladesh Championship League
2	Wari Club	11	7	2	2	11	5	+6	23	Promoted to 2018–19 Bangladesh Championship League
3	Jatrabari	11	5	3	3	15	7	+8	18	
4	Dhaka United	11	4	3	4	12	12	0	15	
5	PWD SC	11	3	6	2	10	10	0	15	
6	Basabo TS	11	3	5	3	7	8	−1	14	
7	Bangladesh Boys	11	4	2	5	10	14	−4	14	
8	Dhaka Wanderers	11	3	3	5	11	11	0	12	
9	Mohakhali Ekadosh	11	3	1	7	12	13	−1	10	
10	Sadharan Bima	11	1	8	2	6	11	−5	11	
11	Badda Jagorani	11	2	3	6	5	14	−9	9	
12	Friends SWO	11	1	4	6	7	10	−3	7	

Rules for classification: 1) Points; 2) Goal difference; 3) Goals scored;
(C) Champions

== Match-fixing ==
=== 2017 ===
On 8 June 2017, Bangladesh Football Federation relegated Dhaka United Sports Club and Friends Social Welfare Organisation during the 2017 league after both clubs were found guilty of playing a fixed match. They were both fined Tk 50,000, while three of the Dhaka United Sports Club players were suspended for different terms following their involvement in the fixed-match which led to Friends Social Welfare Organisation winning the game and thus avoiding relegation. Nevertheless, both clubs alongside apparently relegated, Badda Jagoroni Sangsad, were allowed entry to the 2018–19 Dhaka Senior Division League after their relegation was overturned due to reasons unknown.
