= Friends Social Welfare Organization =

Bangladeshi association football club

Friends SWO
- Full name: Friends Social Welfare Organization
- Short name: FSWO
- Ground: BSSS Mostafa Kamal Stadium
- Capacity: 25,000
- Head Coach: Md Sayeduzzaman Shamim
- League: Dhaka Senior Division League
- 2025–26: 5th of 17
Home colours	Away colours

Friends Social Welfare Organization (Bengali: ফ্রেন্ডস সোশ্যাল ওয়েলফেয়ার অর্গানাইজেশন) is a Bangladeshi football club based in Dhaka. It currently competes in the Dhaka Senior Division League, the third-tier of Bangladeshi football.

== History ==
In 2004, Friends SWO won the Pioneer League 2002 edition, and secured promotion to the Dhaka Third Division League 2003–04 edition held in 2005. In 2007, the club finished fourth in the Third Division, earning promotion to the Second Division, which was next held in 2012, with the club finishing runners-up, earning promotion to the Senior Division.

On 8 June 2017, the Bangladesh Football Federation (BFF) found both Friends SWO and Dhaka United SC guilty of playing a fixed match in the 2017 Dhaka Senior Division League. Friends SWO who finished bottom of the table and destined for relegation, had reportedly fixed their match against United, which helped their opponents avoid relegation. As a result, both clubs were fined Tk 50,000, with United also relegated alonside Friends SWO. Despite this, both clubs and the apparently relegated Badda Jagoroni Sangsad, was granted entry to the 2018–19 Dhaka Senior Division League after their relegation was unexpectedly overturned for reasons that remain unclear.

The club withdrew from the Senior Division prior to the 2023–24 season which was eventually abandoned mid-way due to the 2024 Bangladesh quota reform movement. Nevertheless, they were allowed back into the league in the following edition, in 2025–26.

== Current squad ==
As of 16 November 2025

Note: Flags indicate national team as defined under FIFA eligibility rules; some limited exceptions apply. Players may hold more than one non-FIFA nationality.

No.	Pos.	Nation	Player
1	GK	BAN	Md Jannatul Nayeem Parvege
2	DF	BAN	Md Amzad Arif
3	DF	BAN	Md Shibul
4	DF	BAN	Md Zakir Mia
5	GK	BAN	Roton Hembrom
6	DF	BAN	Imrul Islam Taosib
7	MF	BAN	Md Alamgir
8	MF	BAN	Md Mohasin Ali
9	MF	BAN	Md Jewel Mollik
10	FW	BAN	Imran Hasan Forkan
11	FW	BAN	Md Rumon Islam Rimon
12	MF	BAN	Shakib Ahmed Shakir
13	DF	BAN	Sheikh Rayhan Kabir
14	DF	BAN	Md Ridoy
15	FW	BAN	Md Milon Islam

No.	Pos.	Nation	Player
16	MF	BAN	Starling Lang Bang
17	MF	BAN	Babul Mia
18	MF	BAN	Mohammed Sajib
19	MF	BAN	Shuvo Koli
20	FW	BAN	Badon Kanti Shil
21	FW	BAN	Shahajada Jabbar
22	GK	BAN	Zisadiul Islam Zidan
23	FW	BAN	Mohammed Imran Uddin
24	DF	BAN	Md Raju Mia
25	GK	BAN	Md Masud Rana
26	DF	BAN	Md Aujud Miah
27	FW	BAN	Md Shahir Zaman Sindid
28	MF	BAN	Md Jomer Uddin
29	DF	BAN	Nure Rejwan Piyal
30	GK	BAN	Raj Chowdhury

== Head coach record ==
As of 18 January 2026

Head Coach	From	To	P	W	D	L	GS	GA	%W
(Bangladesh) Md Sayeduzzaman Shamim	1 August 2025	Present	16	9	4	3	30	14	56.25

== Personnel ==
=== Current coaching staff ===
As of 20 November 2025

Position	Name
Team Manager	(Bangladesh) Azlamur Rahman
Assistant Manager	(Bangladesh) Md Iqbal Hossain
Technical Director	(Bangladesh) Md Jahangir Alam Prodhan
Head Coach	(Bangladesh) Sayeduzzaman Shamim
Team Leader	(Bangladesh) Mohammed Akter Hossain
Fitness Coach	(Bangladesh) Noor Hossain
Media Officer	(Bangladesh) Md Sahed Hossain Masum
Security Officer	(Bangladesh) Nizam Uddin
Ball Boy	(Bangladesh) Md Hamim Rifat

== Honours ==
- Dhaka Second Division League
  - Runners-up (1): 2012
- Pioneer League
  - Champions (1): 2002

== See also ==
- List of football clubs in Bangladesh
- History of football in Bangladesh
