= 2018–19 Dhaka Senior Division League =

TVS Senior Division League
- Season: 2018-19
- Dates: 7 September-4 November 2019
- Champions: Kawran Bazar Pragati Sangha
- Promoted: Kawran Bazar Pragati Sangha; Dhaka Wanderers Club
- Relegated: Dhaka United SC

The 2018–19 Dhaka Senior Division League was 5th season of the league since the league was rebranded as third tier Dhaka Senior Division League in 2007. A total of 13 teams competed in the league. Kawran Bazar PS won the title, with Dhaka Wanderers Club following in second.

== 2019 Dhaka Senior Division League Teams ==
The following 13 clubs competed in the Dhaka Senior Division League during the season 2019.

- Dhaka United SC
- Dhaka Wanderers Club
- PWD SC
- Jatrabari KC
- Mohakhali XI
- Badda Jagoroni Sangsad
- Bangladesh Boys Club
- Kawran Bazar Progoti Sangha
- Koshaituli Samaj Kollyan Sangsad
- Nawabpur Krira Sangha
- Basabo Tarun Sangha
- Sadharan Bima Sangstha
- Friends Social Organisation
