= 2022–23 Dhaka Second Division Football League =

Dhaka Second Division Football League
- Season: 2022–23
- Dates: 7 October 2023–14 December 2023
- Champions: Jatrabari JS
- Promoted: Jatrabari JS; Arambagh FA
- Relegated: Kadamtola Sangsad; ~~City Club~~
- Matches: 210
- Goals: 212 (1.01 per match)
- Top goalscorer: 11 Goals; Aryan Sikder (Jatrabari JS)

The 2022–23 Dhaka Second Division Football League, also known as Bashundhara Group Second Division Football League for sponsorship reasons, is the 2022–23 edition of the fourth-tier in the Bangladeshi football league system. The season ran from 7 October 2023 to 1 December 2023.

Saif Sporting Club Youth Team is the defending champion having won the title in the 2021–22 season and were promoted to the Dhaka Senior Division Football League along with runner-up, Siddikbazar Dhaka Jr. SC. Khilgaon FA and Alamgir Somaj Kollayan KS were relegated to the Dhaka Third Division Football League.

== Promotion and relegation ==
The following teams have changed division since the previous season:

=== Entered ===
- Teams relegated from the Senior Division (2021–22)
  - Dilkusha SC
  - Victoria SC
- Teams promoted from the Third Division (2021–22)
  - No teams were promoted as the 2021–22 Dhaka Third Division Football League was not held.

=== Left ===
- Teams promoted from the Second Division (2021–22)
  - Saif Sporting Club Youth Team
  - Siddikbazar Dhaka Jr. SC
- Teams relegated from the Second Division (2021–22)
  - Khilgaon FA
  - Alamgir Somaj Kollayan KS
- Other
  - Little Friends Club were given permission to enter the professional second-tier league, the Bangladesh Championship League from the 2022–23 season.

== Participating clubs ==
Team	Location
Arambagh Football Academy	(Arambagh), Dhaka
Bangladesh Press Sports & Recreation Club	Dhaka
Bangladesh Krira Shikkha Protishtan	(Savar), Dhaka
Bikrampur Kings	(Bikrampur), Munshiganj
City Club	(Mirpur), Dhaka
Dilkusha Sporting Club	(Dilkusha), Dhaka
Gouripur Sporting Club	(Daudkandi), Comilla
Jabid Ahsan Sohel Krira Chakra	Dhaka
Jatrabari Jhatika Sangsad	Jatrabari, Dhaka
Kadamtola Sangsad	Dhaka
Kallol Sangha	Chittagong
Kingstar Sporting Club	Dhaka
Purbachal Parishad	Dhaka
Tongi Krira Chakra	(Tongi), Gazipur
Victoria Sporting Club	Dhaka

== Venue ==
All games will be played at the BSSS Mostafa Kamal Stadium in Dhaka, Bangladesh.

Dhaka	Dhaka is located in Bangladesh
BSSS Mostafa Kamal Stadium	Dhaka is located in Bangladesh
Capacity: 25,000	Dhaka is located in Bangladesh

== League table ==
Pos	Team	Pld	W	D	L	GF	GA	GD	Pts	Qualification
1	Jatrabari JS	14	11	3	0	25	8	+17	36	Qualification for the 2023–24 Dhaka Senior Division League
2	Arambagh FA	14	6	4	4	4	8	−4	22	Qualification for the 2023–24 Dhaka Senior Division League
3	Kallol Sangha	14	5	6	3	18	10	+8	21	
4	Bikrampur Kings	14	5	6	3	12	12	0	21	
5	Purbachal Parishad	14	4	8	2	15	10	+5	20	
6	Jabid Ahsan Sohel KC	14	4	5	5	24	20	+4	17	
7	Victoria SC	14	4	5	5	22	23	−1	17	
8	Kingstar SC	14	4	5	5	11	15	−4	17	
9	Dilkusha SC	14	3	8	3	11	16	−5	17	
10	BKSP (Note: BKSP were disqualified from the league by BFF after the club's management was linked to signing players under fake names. BKSP's matchday 12 opponents, Arambagh FA and matchday 14 opponents, Kallol Sangha, were both awarded 3-0 victories.)	14	7	2	5	19	17	+2	23	
11	Gouripur SC	14	4	4	6	11	19	−8	16	
12	Tongi KC	14	4	2	8	12	18	−6	14	
13	BG Press S&RC	14	2	7	5	12	15	−3	13	
14	City Club (Note: City Club were given permission to enter the professional second-tier league, the Bangladesh Championship League from the 2024–25 season.)	14	1	9	4	8	13	−5	12	Relegation to Dhaka Third Division Football League
15	Kadamtola Sangsad	14	2	4	8	9	18	−9	10	Relegation to Dhaka Third Division Football League

Source: BFF
