= Sayeed Hassan Kanan =

Bangladeshi footballer and coach

Kanan
Personal information
- Full name: Sayeed Hassan Kanan
- Date of birth: 15 February 1964 (age 62)
- Place of birth: Dhaka, East Pakistan
- Height: 1.80 m (5 ft 11 in)
- Position: Goalkeeper

Team information
- Current team: Mohammedan SC (goalkeeping coach)

Youth career
- 1979: Naveen Krira Chakra

Senior career*
Years	Team	Apps	(Gls)
1979–1980	Abahani Krira Chakra		
1981–1982	Farashganj		
1983	Brothers Union		
1984–1996	Dhaka Mohammedan		
1991	Kolkata Mohammedan		

International career
1985–1993	Bangladesh		

Managerial career
- 1985–2003: Badda Jagoroni
- 2017: Badda Jagoroni
- 2021–present: Mohammedan SC (goalkeeping coach)
- 2022: Bangladesh U17 (goalkeeping coach)
- 2024: Badda Jagoroni
- 2026: Mohammedan SC (acting head coach)
Medal record
Representing Bangladesh
South Asian Games
Silver medal – second place	1985
Silver medal – second place	1989
- * Club domestic league appearances and goals

Sayeed Hassan Kanan (Bengali: সাঈদ হাসান কানন; born 15 February 1964) is a former Bangladeshi footballer who played as a goalkeeper. During his playing days, he was popularly known by his nickname Kanan, pronounced Ka-non.

He started his career with Naveen Krira Chakra and rose to prominence while playing for leading Dhaka club Mohammedan SC during the 1980s and 1990s. At his peak, he was the finest goalkeeper in the country, and represented the Bangladesh national team numerous times.

Since his retirement, he has remained active in football. Starting from 2002 until 2008, he was part of the national team coaching panel. He currently serves as the goalkeeping coach of his former club Mohammedan SC. Kannan also serves as the team manager of Dhaka Senior Division League club Badda Jagoroni Sangsad.

== Early life ==
Kanan's family included six siblings, and his father worked at the Bangladesh Government Press, also known as Central Press. After the Bangladesh Liberation War, his family struggled financially, thus Kanan urged to become a footballer at office clubs, such as Team BJMC, Customs, Qaumi Jute Mills and various other spinning mills.

== Club career ==
Kanan grew up in the Badda area of Dhaka, and in 1979, he started playing in the Youth Football League with Naveen Krira Chakra, which is now Badda Jagoroni. In December 1979, Irish coach William Bill Hart of First Division giants Abahani Krira Chakra held a goalkeeper tiral, for which players had to pay 30 rupees to join. Although, Kanan stood in line without paying, he was the first player selected by the coach.

I saw about 30 balls in front of him. As soon as I stood in goal, he started shooting. I also jumped and saved some of his shots. Impressed with my keeping, I heard Bill Hart say to the other coaches, "I will take this boy. Fix the other two."

— Kanan to Kaler Kantho in December 2017.

However, with Mohamed Mohsin being the first choice goalkeeper at Abahani, coach Ali Imam fixed Kanan a move to Farashganj SC, who were recently promoted from the Second Division. He spent his first season at the club as the second choice, earning 30 thousand taka, and by 1982 he became a regular face in the lineup. In 1983, he joined Brothers Union, and after a third-place finish in his debut season at the club, Kanan moved to Dhaka Mohammedan.

At Mohammedan he was the main goalkeeper for more than a decade, winning the league title five times, and was also part of the team which defeated Iranian giants Persepolis to reach the semi-final league round of the 1988–89 Asian Club Championship. He was the mainstay between the post as the Black and Whites were unbeaten in the league from 8 September 1985 to 15 March 1990. In the final of the 1991 Independence Cup, he saved four shots in the tiebreaker against Abahani. He was club captain in the 1991–92 season, taking over from Kaiser Hamid. In 1996, he began focusing on his coaching career and retired from playing as Mohammedan became undefeated league champions.

== International career ==
Kanan replaced the injured Moinul Islam in the Bangladesh team for the 1986 FIFA World Cup qualifiers in Indonesia. Although he did not get selected from the main camp held by coach Abdur Rahim, a second selection round under the observation of Bangladesh Football Federation president Hafizuddin Ahmed, saw Kanan get a place in the team. In the national team, he was mainly the second choice goalkeeper to Mohamed Mohsin. Nonetheless, he played five games at the 1988 AFC Asian Cup qualifiers, and was the main goalkeeper under Nasser Hejazi at the 1989 South Asian Games in Islamabad, Pakistan. His mistake against Pakistan in the final was heavily criticised by both media and fans. He collided with defender Monem Munna, while trying to clear the ball and missed, leaving an empty post as Haji Abdul Sattar scored. Kanan was the captain of the Bangladesh Red team at the 1989 Bangladesh President's Gold Cup, however, missed the final due to an injury. He was replaced in goal by Showkat Ali Selim, whose penalty shoot-out heroics lead the team to victory over South Korea University. His international career came to an end after the 1994 FIFA World Cup qualifiers, during which Bangladesh suffered an 8–0 defeat at the hands of Japan.

== Post-playing career ==
Knan also received the Dhaka University Blue award. After that, he was also elected Sports Secretary in the Dhaka University Central Students' Union election of 1990 by getting the highest number of votes. In 2002, Kanan got involved with the Bangladesh Football Federation (BFF), and in 2004, he was part of the National Team Management Committee (NTMC). During the 2003 SAFF Championship, Kanan was the general manager of the title winning Bangladesh team under György Kottán. In 2005, Kanan was appointed as the national team general manager under head coach Andrés Cruciani.

In June 2007, it was reported that some sports organisers allegedly made money by using their offices to get contracts from the National Sports Council during the BNP-led government, and Kanan was one of them. Following these accusations he was removed from his post in the Federation, only to be reappointed in 2008.

Kanan began coaching Badda Jagoroni in 1985 while continuing his playing career. Starting from 1986, as champions of the Pioneer League, Badda debuted in the Dhaka Premier Division League in 1999 under his guidance. In the same year, under Kanan's coaching, Badda toured West Bengal, lifting the Independence Day Cup held in South Dinajpur, Calcutta, India, while also reaching the semi-finals of the IFA Shield. In 2004, he stepped away as coach and became a member of the club's ad hoc committee. In 2017, after attaining an AFC B license, he was again made the head coach of the club for the 2017 Dhaka Senior Division League.

In October 2021, he joined Mohammedan SC as the goalkeeping coach under Sean Lane. In addition to the AFC license, Kanan also completed position goalkeeper courses level 1 and level 2. He was the Bangladesh U17 goalkeeping coach at the 2022 SAFF U-17 Championship in Colombo, Sri Lanka.

Following the 2024 Bangladesh Football Federation election, Kanan was elected to the Executive Committee of the Bangladesh Football Federation (BFF) in 2025. He also serves as a member of the BFF National Teams Committee and as chairman of the U-17 National Football League Committee.

== Honours ==
=== Player ===
Dhaka Mohammedan

- Dhaka First Division/Premier Division League: 1986, 1987, 1988–89, 1993, 1996
- Federation Cup: 1987, 1989, 1995
- Ma-O-Moni Gold Cup: 1990
- Independence Cup: 1991
- DMFA Cup: 1993, 1995

Bangladesh

- South Asian Games Silver medal: 1985, 1989

=== Manager ===
Badda Jagoroni Sangsad

- Dhaka First Division League: 1997–98; runner-up: 2001
- Dhaka Second Division League runners-up: 1994–95
- Dhaka Third Division League runners-up: 1991
- Pioneer League: 1986
- West Bengal Independence Day Cup: 1999

=== Awards and accolades ===
- 1990 − Sports Writers Association's Footballer of the Year
