= 2025–26 Dhaka Senior Division League =

Dhaka Senior Division League
- Season: 2025–26
- Dates: 15 November 2025–21 January 2026
- Champions: Jatrabari KC (1st title)
- Promoted: Jatrabari KC; Mohakhali Ekadosh
- Relegated: Nobabpur KC; T&T Club Motijheel
- Matches: 136
- Goals: 349 (2.57 per match)
- Top goalscorer: Md Masrafi Islam (Mohakhali Ekadosh) (18 goals)
- Highest scoring: Jatrabari KC 6–0 Siddique Bazar Dhaka Junior SC (24 November 2025); Swadhinata KS 5–3 Siddique Bazar Dhaka Junior SC (30 November 2025)
- Longest winning run: Sadharan Bima CSC (5 matches)
- Longest unbeaten run: Sadharan Bima CSC (5 matches)
- Longest losing run: Nobabpur KC (7 matches)

The 2025–26 Dhaka Senior Division Football League was the 7th season of the Dhaka Senior Division League since it was rebranded in 2007. The previous edition, which would have been the 7th edition, was abandoned due to the 2024 Bangladesh quota reform movement. A total of seventeen clubs were participated in the league which begun on 15 November 2025 and concluded on 21 January 2026.

Jatrabari KC is the current champions who have won the trophy and promoted to the 2025–26 Bangladesh Championship League.

== Venue ==
All matches of the league were played at these ground.

Dhaka	Dhaka is located in Bangladesh
BSSS Mostafa Kamal Stadium	Dhaka is located in Bangladesh
Capacity: 25,000	Dhaka is located in Bangladesh

== Team changes ==
Promoted from 2024–25 Senior Division	Relegated from 2024–25 BCL	Direct entry to 2025–26 Senior Division	Relegated to 2026–27 Second Division
No team was promoted, League was cancelled.	Farashganj SC; Uttar Baridhara	Dhaka United; Friend Social Welfare	Nobabpur KC; T&T Club

== Teams ==
The following seventeen clubs were participated in the league.

Team	Head coach	Captain
Arambagh FA	(Bangladesh) Md Tipu Sultan	(Bangladesh) Nurul Alam
Badda Jagorani	(Bangladesh) Md Saiful Islam	(Bangladesh) Md Limon Mia
Bangladesh Boys	(Bangladesh) Md Harun	(Bangladesh) Md Rakib Islam
Basabo TS	(Bangladesh) Mohammad Ullah Dalim	(Bangladesh) Md Parvez
Dhaka United	(Bangladesh) Md Masud Alam Jahangir	(Bangladesh) Sohag Borman
East End	(Bangladesh) Md Shahdat Hossain	(Bangladesh) Md Shawon Ali
Friends Social Welfare	(Bangladesh) Md Sayeduzzaman Shamim	(Bangladesh) Imran Hasan Forkan
Jatrabari KC	(Bangladesh) Md Arman Hossain	(Bangladesh) Raj Uddin
Kashaituly SKP	(Bangladesh) Naimur Rahman Sahed	(Bangladesh) Rafael Mardi
Mohakhali Ekadosh	(Bangladesh) Md Shofikul Hasan Polash	(Bangladesh) Md Imran Islam Anu
Nobabpur KC	(Bangladesh) Mizanur Rahman Dawn	(Bangladesh) Omar Faruk Ontor
NoFeL	(Bangladesh) Md Jahangir Alam	(Bangladesh) Asif Akbor
Somaj Kallyan Mugda	(Bangladesh) Ali Asgar Naser	(Bangladesh) Md Moyeen Uddin
Sadharan Bima	(Bangladesh) Monowar Hossain	(Bangladesh) Md Rasel Munshi
Siddique Bazar JSC	(Bangladesh) Md Murad Ahmed Milon	(Bangladesh) Kamran Ahmed Milad
Swadhinata KS	(Bangladesh) Md Ashraful Haque	(Bangladesh) Fahad Khan
T&T Club	(Bangladesh) Robiul Hasan Khan Mona	(Bangladesh) Mohammad Faychal Miah

== League table ==
Pos	Team	Pld	W	D	L	GF	GA	GD	Pts	Qualification or relegation
1	Jatrabari KC	16	12	4	0	36	6	+30	40	Qualification for the 2026–27 BCL
2	Mohakhali Ekadosh	16	11	3	2	41	16	+25	36	Qualification for the 2026–27 BCL
3	Sadharan Bima	16	11	3	2	29	15	+14	36	
4	Kashaituly SKP	16	9	4	3	26	9	+17	31	
5	Friend Social Welfare	16	9	4	3	30	14	+16	31	
6	Dhaka United	16	8	3	5	21	14	+7	27	
7	Basabo TS	16	5	5	6	19	22	−3	20	
8	NoFeL	16	4	7	5	18	17	+1	19	
9	Badda Jagoroni	16	4	6	6	23	23	0	18	
10	East End	16	4	6	6	13	15	−2	18	
11	Bangladesh Boys	16	5	2	9	8	14	−6	17	
12	Swadhinata KS	16	4	5	7	15	23	−8	17	
13	Arambagh FA	16	4	4	8	18	27	−9	16	
14	Siddique Bazar	16	5	1	10	20	37	−17	16	
15	Somaj Kallyan	16	4	3	9	15	24	−9	15	
16	Nobabpur KC	16	3	2	11	8	30	−22	11	Relegation to the 2026–27 Second Division League
17	T&T Club	16	2	2	12	11	45	−34	8	Relegation to the 2026–27 Second Division League

Source: Sofascore
Rules for classification: (1) Points; (2) Goal difference; (3) Goals scored;

=== Result by games ===
No Home\No Away	SBDJSC	FSW	NFL	BBC	KSKP	NKC	EEC	SKKSM	BTS	MXI	SBCSC	BJS	JKC	DUS	AFA	SKS	T&T
Siddique Bazar	—		2–2		0–3	1–0		0–1		1–6	1–4			1–3			4–1
Friend Welfare	2–1	—	1–1		0–1	0–1		4–1		3–1	2–2			4–2	2–2		
NoFel SC			—	3–0			1–0		1–2			1–1	0–3	1–2		0–1	3–0
Bangladesh Boys	0–1	0–2		—		2–0					2–0	0–0	0–1		0–0	2–0	
Kashaituly SKP			0–1	0–1	—		0–0	3–1	0–0			2–1					3–1
Nobabpur KC			1–0		0–5	—	0–0	0–2	1–1	0–3							1–4
East End	0–2	0–2		0–2			—				0–1	0–0	1–1	1–3	2–1	1–1	
Somaj Kallyan			1–1	1–0			0–1	—	1–3			3–4	1–2				1–0
Basabo	1–3	0–2		2–0			2–2		—			1–1	2–3	0–0	1–0	0–1	
Mohakhali Ekadosh			0–0	0–1	1–1		1–0	1–0	4–1	—							7–1
Sadharan Bima			1–1		1–0	2–1		2–1	3–1	1–3	—			1–0			5–1
Badda Jagoroni	2–0	0–2				3–1				1–2	0–1	—	1–4		1–1	1–1	
Jatrabari KC	6–0	0–0			0–0	4–1				0–0	2–0		—		0–4	2–0	
Dhaka United				1–0	0–1	2–0		1–1		0–3		3–0	0–1	—		2–0	
Arambagh FA	1–0		2–2		2–5	1–0		2–0		3–5	1–2			0–2	—		2–0
Swadhinata KS	5–0				0–2	0–1		0–0		3–4	1–1				1–0	—	
T&T Club		0–3		1–0			0–3		0–2			1–7	0–3	0–0		1–1	—

Source: BFF
Legend: Blue = left column team win; Yellow = draw; Red = top row team win.

=== Result by rounds ===
Team ╲ Round	1	2	3	4	5	6	7	8	9	10	11	12	13	14	15	16	17
Siddique Bazar Dhaka Junior SC	L	L	L	L	L	D	L	W	L	–	L	W	L	W	W	W	L
NoFeL SC	L	D	W	D	–	D	L	D	W	L	W	D	D	W	L	D	L
Friend Social	W	D	W	W	D	–	W	W	D	L	D	W	W	W	L	D	W
Bangladesh Boys	L	W	W	L	W	D	W	L	L	W	L	L	L	D	–	L	L
Kashaituly SKP	–	W	D	L	D	W	L	D	W	W	D	W	W	L	W	W	W
Nobabpur KC	D	L	L	L	L	L	L	L	W	W	W	L	L	–	L	D	L
East End	D	L	L	D	D	D	W	D	L	W	W	W	–	L	D	L	L
Somaj Kallyan Mugda	W	L	–	W	L	L	L	W	W	L	L	L	L	D	D	D	L
Basabo TS	L	D	D	L	W	L	W	L	W	W	–	L	D	L	D	D	W
Mohakhali Ekadosh	W	W	W	W	L	W	W	D	D	W	W	D	L	W	W	–	W
Sadharan Bima	W	L	W	W	L	W	D	D	D	W	W	–	W	W	W	W	W
Badda Jagoroni	W	D	L	D	W	D	L	L	L	L	W	D	D	L	W	D	–
Jatrabari KC	W	–	W	W	W	D	W	W	D	W	D	W	W	W	W	D	W
Dhaka United	W	W	L	W	D	L	W	W	–	L	W	L	D	D	L	W	W
Arambagh FA	L	W	L	D	D	W	L	–	W	L	L	L	W	D	L	D	L
Swadhinata KS	L	D	W	–	W	W	D	D	L	L	L	D	L	L	D	L	W
T&T Club	L	D	L	L	D	L	–	L	L	L	L	W	W	L	L	L	L

Source: BFF
W = Win; D = Draw; L = Lose

=== Position by rounds ===
Team ╲ Round	1	2	3	4	5	6	7	8	9	10	11	12	13	14	15	16	17
Siddique Bazar Dhaka Junior SC																	
NoFeL SC																	
Friend Social																	
Bangladesh Boys																	
Kashaituly SKP																	
Nobabpur KC																	16
East End																	
Somaj Kallyan Mugda																	
Basabo TS																	
Mohakhali Ekadosh																	
Sadharan Bima																	
Badda Jagoroni																	
Jatrabari KC																	
Dhaka United																	
Arambagh FA																	
Swadhinata KS																	
T&T Club																	17

Source: BFF
= Leader; = Runners-up

== Season statistics ==
=== Scoring ===
- First goal of the season:
  (Bangladesh) Nur Uddin Shazal (NoFeL) against (Dhaka United) (15 November 2025)

=== Goalscorers ===
There have been 349 goals scored in 136 matches, for an average of 2.57 goals per match.

18 goals

- (Bangladesh) Md Masrafi Islam (Mohakhali Ekadosh)

13 goals

- (Bangladesh) Sabuj Shek (Sadharan Bima CSC)

9 goals

- (Bangladesh) Md Rabiul Awal (Siddique Bazar DJSC)
- (Bangladesh) Shujon Mahato (Badda Jagoroni Sangsad)

7 goals

- (Bangladesh) Md Mahbubul Islam (NoFeL)
- (Bangladesh) Mojibur Rahman (Jatrabari KC)
- (Bangladesh) Md Raisul Islam Rahid (NoFeL)

6 goals

- (Bangladesh) Raj Uddin (Jatrabari KC)
- (Bangladesh) Shakib Ahmed Shakir (Friends Social Welfare)
- (Bangladesh) Aryan Shikder (Jatrabari KC)

5 goals

- (Bangladesh) Md Didarul Islam (Kashaituly SKP)
- (Bangladesh) Polash Ahmmed (Basabo Tarun Sangha)
- (Bangladesh) Md Foridul Islam (Somaj Kallyan Mugda)
- (Bangladesh) Md Milon Islam (Friends Social Welfare)
- (Bangladesh) Md Alamgir (Friends Social Welfare)
- (Bangladesh) Ammar Ibne Amin (Kashaituly SKP)
- (Bangladesh) Md Rana Ahammed (Dhaka United)

4 goals

- (Bangladesh) Md Alif Nur (Swadhinata KS)
- (Bangladesh) Sujon Mia (East End Club)
- (Bangladesh) Sakib Sultan Rafu (Sadharan Bima CSC)
- (Bangladesh) Fayjul Karim (Sadharan Bima CSC)
- (Bangladesh) Shariar Ahammed Shuvo (Mohakhali Ekadosh)
- (Bangladesh) Ajijur Rahman (Badda Jagoroni Sangsad)
- (Bangladesh) Ajanta Chakma (Arambagh FA)
- (Bangladesh) Rahim Hasan Biltu (Dhaka United)
- (Bangladesh) Md Shohag Hossain (Nobabpur KC)
- (Bangladesh) Titas Kusur (Kashaituly SKP)
- (Bangladesh) Md Yeasin Sheikh (Kashaituly SKP)
- (Bangladesh) Al-Nahiyan Rahat (Mohakhali Ekadosh)
- (Bangladesh) Sabbir Ahammed Opurbo (Mohakhali Ekadosh)
- (Bangladesh) Zahidul Islam Jonait (Basabo Tarun Sangha)

3 goals

- Murshedul Alam Samir (Bangladesh Boys Club)
- (Bangladesh) Md Rahat Shekh (Dhaka United)
- (Bangladesh) Starling Lang Bang (Friends Social Welfare)
- (Bangladesh) Md Rumon Islam Rimon (Friends Social Welfare)
- (Bangladesh) Imran Hasan Forkan (Friends Social Welfare)
- (Bangladesh) Md Mohinul Hoque (Arambagh FA)
- (Bangladesh) Nurul Alam (Arambagh FA)
- (Bangladesh) Jahidul Islam Shovon (Basabo Tarun Sangha)
- (Bangladesh) Md Shamim Mia (Badda Jagoroni Sangsad)
- (Bangladesh) Abdul Munim Simon (Jatrabari KC)
- (Bangladesh) Mizanur Rahman Mizan (Sadharan Bima CSC)

2 goals

- (Bangladesh) Saidul Islam (Mohakhali Ekadosh)
- (Bangladesh) Rashedul Islam Jihan (Mohakhali Ekadosh)
- (Bangladesh) Bayzid Bostami (Basabo Tarun Sangha)
- (Bangladesh) Md Shamal Bepari (Siddique Bazar DJSC)
- (Bangladesh) Md Eftekhar Mahmud (Siddique Bazar DJSC)
- (Bangladesh) Mohammad Sarif Mia (Swadhinata KS)
- (Bangladesh) Md Fazle Rabbi (Swadhinata KS)
- (Bangladesh) Md Sohan (Swadhinata KS)
- (Bangladesh) Md Mostakin Ali (Swadhinata KS)
- (Bangladesh) Md Mehedi Hasan (Jatrabari KC)
- (Bangladesh) Md Shirajul Islam Shakib (Jatrabari KC)
- (Bangladesh) Md Suhel Ahmed (Kashaituly SKP)
- (Bangladesh) Luis Kisshu (Kashaituly SKP)
- (Bangladesh) Imran Islam Anu (Mohakhali Ekadosh)
- (Bangladesh) Md Mominul Islam (Somaj Kallyan Mugda)
- (Bangladesh) Md Shagor Mia (Somaj Kallyan Mugda)
- Md Zahid Hasan (Bangladesh Boys Club)
- (Bangladesh) Md Jewel Mollik (Friends Social Welfare)
- (Bangladesh) Anisur Sheikh (Jatrabari KC)
- (Bangladesh) Ronjon Kumar (T&T Club Motijheel)
- (Bangladesh) Md Shawon Ali (East End Club)
- (Bangladesh) Md Raihan Hossain (Kashaituly SKP)
- (Bangladesh) Al-Amin (Dhaka United)
- (Bangladesh) Md Sabuj Mia (Basabo Tarun Sangha)
- (Bangladesh) Sheikh Farid (Arambagh FA)
- (Bangladesh) Md Atikur Rahman (Siddique Bazar DJSC)
- (Bangladesh) Md Zomzom Akhter (East End Club)

1 goal

- (Bangladesh) Abdullah Al Kasem (Badda Jagoroni Sangsad)
- (Bangladesh) Mehebub Hasan Nayan (Badda Jagoroni Sangsad)
- (Bangladesh) Tarikul Islam (Basabo Tarun Sangha)
- (Bangladesh) Md Arshadul Haque (Basabo Tarun Sangha)
- (Bangladesh) Nodhusudon Rajbongshi (Basabo Tarun Sangha)
- (Bangladesh) Moin Uddin (Dhaka United)
- (Bangladesh) Md Anwar Hossain (Dhaka United)
- (Bangladesh) Sohag Borman (Dhaka United)
- (Bangladesh) Md Al-Amin (Dhaka United)
- (Bangladesh) Samrajul Islam Kaiser (Dhaka United)
- (Bangladesh) Md Al Kafi (Dhaka United)
- (Bangladesh) Julkarnine Sarder (Jatrabari KC)
- (Bangladesh) Md Shirajul Islam (Jatrabari KC)
- (Bangladesh) Md Masum Islam (Jatrabari KC)
- (Bangladesh) Md Rohan (Jatrabari KC)
- (Bangladesh) Md Shakib Sarker (Jatrabari KC)
- (Bangladesh) Md Saiful Sarder (Jatrabari KC)
- (Bangladesh) Shakil Hossain (Jatrabari KC)
- (Bangladesh) Nur Uddin Shazal (NoFeL)
- (Bangladesh) Asif Akbar (NoFeL)
- (Bangladesh) Noyon Malaka (NoFeL)
- (Bangladesh) Jomou (NoFeL)
- (Bangladesh) Abdur Rahim Matubbar (NoFeL)
- (Bangladesh) Md Ibrahim (Somaj Kallyan Mugda)
- (Bangladesh) Md Manjurul Akash (Somaj Kallyan Mugda)
- (Bangladesh) Md Atikul Islam (Somaj Kallyan Mugda)
- (Bangladesh) Ali Hasib (Somaj Kallyan Mugda)
- (Bangladesh) Abu Bakkar Siddik (Somaj Kallyan Mugda)
- (Bangladesh) Kamran Sheikh (Sadharan Bima CSC)
- (Bangladesh) Md Ismail Hossain (Swadhinata KS)
- (Bangladesh) Sharif Kha (Swadhinata KS)
- (Bangladesh) Habib Hossain Sojib (Swadhinata KS)
- (Bangladesh) Md Akash Ahmed Sujon (T&T Club Motijheel)
- (Bangladesh) Md Rasel Hosen (Mohakhali Ekadosh)
- (Bangladesh) Rashedul Islam Jihan (Mohakhali Ekadosh)
- (Bangladesh) Sojib Mia (Mohakhali Ekadosh)
- (Bangladesh) Al Nahiyan Rahat (Mohakhali Ekadosh)
- (Bangladesh) Md Akikul Islam (Mohakhali Ekadosh)
- Md Helal (Bangladesh Boys Club)
- Omar Faruk Ontor (Bangladesh Boys Club)
- (Bangladesh) Md Zahidul Islam Nayem (Siddique Bazar DJSC)
- (Bangladesh) Kamran Ahmad Milad (Siddique Bazar DJSC)
- (Bangladesh) Tanjim (Siddique Bazar DJSC)
- (Bangladesh) Mofizur Rahman Mithu (Siddique Bazar DJSC)
- (Bangladesh) Tanzil (Siddique Bazar DJSC)
- (Bangladesh) Md Sagor (Nobabpur KC)
- (Bangladesh) Md Atik Hasan (Nobabpur KC)
- (Bangladesh) Al Amin Hossain (Nobabpur KC)
- (Bangladesh) Md Al Amin (Badda Jagoroni Sangsad)
- (Bangladesh) Md Rasel Mia (Badda Jagoroni Sangsad)
- (Bangladesh) Md Shawun Hossain (Badda Jagoroni Sangsad)
- (Bangladesh) Md Habibur Rahman (Badda Jagoroni Sangsad)
- (Bangladesh) Sakib Al Hasan (Badda Jagoroni Sangsad)
- (Bangladesh) Md Shorgo Molla (Arambagh FA)
- (Bangladesh) Md Shohan Shek (Arambagh FA)
- (Bangladesh) Abdullah Al Hasan (Arambagh FA)
- (Bangladesh) Mahim Uzzaman (Arambagh FA)
- (Bangladesh) Md Magdad Ali (Arambagh FA)
- (Bangladesh) Md Shawon Ali (T&T Club Motijheel)
- (Bangladesh) Masrur Ahmed (T&T Club Motijheel)
- (Bangladesh) Md Shohan Mia (T&T Club Motijheel)
- (Bangladesh) Md Udoy Pormanik (T&T Club Motijheel)
- (Bangladesh) Md Khalilur Rahman (T&T Club Motijheel)
- (Bangladesh) Arman Hossain (T&T Club Motijheel)
- (Bangladesh) Nasir Uddin (T&T Club Motijheel)
- (Bangladesh) Nipun Tigga (T&T Club Motijheel)
- (Bangladesh) Md Ferdous Sheikh (East End Club)
- (Bangladesh) Md Shawon Ali (East End Club)
- (Bangladesh) Md Foyjul Karim (East End Club)
- (Bangladesh) Ananda Sarder (T&T Club Motijheel)
- Tofazzol Hossain Mohan (Bangladesh Boys Club)
- (Bangladesh) Rajib Mia (East End Club)
- (Bangladesh) Mubbashir (Sadharan Bima CSC)
- (Bangladesh) Riaz Khalifa (Sadharan Bima CSC)
- (Bangladesh) Md Amirul Islam (Sadharan Bima CSC)
- (Bangladesh) Mubashir Ebnay Mamun Jahin (Sadharan Bima CSC)
- (Bangladesh) Babul Mia (Friends Social Welfare)
- (Bangladesh) Roton Hembrom (Friends Social Welfare)
- (Bangladesh) Rafikul Islam Rahat (Kashaituly SKP)
- (Bangladesh) Rafikul Islam (Nobabpur KC)
- (Bangladesh) Sobug Chandra Das (Kashaituly SKP)

Source: BFF

=== Own goals ===
† Bold Club indicates winner of the match.

As of 18 January 2026

Player	Club	Opponent	Result	Date	Ref
(Bangladesh) Md Mofizur Rahman Mithu	Siddique Bazar Dhaka Junior SC	Dhaka United Sports Club	1–3	22 December 2025	
(Bangladesh) Arman Sadi	Mohakhali Ekadosh	Friends Social Welfare Organization	1–3	2 January 2026	
(Bangladesh) Md Nazmul Hasan	Mohakhali Ekadosh	Arambagh Football Academy	5–3	11 January 2026	
(Bangladesh) Md Shibul	Friends Social Welfare Organization	Somaj Kallyan KS Mugda	4–1	18 January 2026	

=== Hat-tricks ===
† Bold Club indicates winner of the match.

As of 19 January 2026

Player	For	Against	Result	Date	Ref
(Bangladesh) Shakib Ahmed Shakir	Friends Social Welfare Organization	Dhaka United Sports Club	(H) 4–2	27 November 2025	
(Bangladesh) Md Didarul Islam^{4}	Kashaituly SKP	Nobabpur KC	(H) 5–0	6 December 2025	
(Bangladesh) Mojibur Rahman	Jatrabari KC	Nobabpur KC	(H) 4–1	9 December 2025	
(Bangladesh) Md Raisul Islam Rahid	NoFeL SC	Bangladesh Boys Club	(H) 3–0	23 December 2025	
(Bangladesh) Shujon Mahato	Badda Jagoroni Sangsad	Somaj Kallyan KS Mugda	(A) 4–3	24 December 2025	
(Bangladesh) Md Rabiul Awal	Siddique Bazar Dhaka Junior SC	Basabo Tarun Sangha	(A) 3–1	29 December 2025	
(Bangladesh) Md Mashrafi Islam^{6}	Mohakhali Ekadosh	T&T Club Motijheel	(H) 7–1	6 January 2026	
(Bangladesh) Md Shujon Mahato	Badda Jagoroni Sangsad	T&T Club Motijheel	(H) 7–1	9 January 2026	
(Bangladesh) Md Mashrafi Islam	Mohakhali Ekadosh	Arambagh Football Academy	(A) 5–3	11 January 2026	
(Bangladesh) Md Mashrafi Islam	Mohakhali Ekadosh	Siddique Bazar Dhaka Junior SC	(A) 6–1	19 January 2026	
(Bangladesh) Ariyan Shikder	Jatrabari KC	T&T Club Motijheel	(H) 3–0	19 January 2026	
