= 2013 Bangladesh Championship League =

Premier Bank Championship League
- Season: 2013
- Champions: Chittagong Abahani
- Promoted: Chittagong Abahani & Uttar Baridhara
- Relegated: Dhaka United SC

The 2013 Premier Bank Bangladesh Championship League started on 11 February 2013 where 8 clubs competed with each other on home and away basis.

== Teams and locations ==
Locations of teams in the 2013 Bangladesh Championship League

The following 8 clubs competed in the Bangladesh Championship League during the 2013 season.

- Agrani Bank SC, Dhaka
- Chittagong Abahani, Chittagong
- Dhaka United SC, Dhaka
- Farashganj SC, Dhaka
- Rahmatganj MFS, Dhaka
- Uttar Baridhara SC, Dhaka
- Victoria SC, Dhaka
- Wari Club, Dhaka

The venues were-

- Bir Sherestha Shaheed Shipahi Mostafa Kamal Stadium, Dhaka
- MA Aziz Stadium, Chittagong

== Standings ==
Pos	Team	Pld	W	D	L	GF	GA	GD	Pts	Promotion or relegation
1	Chittagong Abahani (C, P)	14	9	3	2	28	11	+17	30	2013–14 Bangladesh Football Premier League
2	Uttar Baridhara SC (P)	14	6	7	1	27	14	+13	25	2013–14 Bangladesh Football Premier League
3	Rahmatganj MFS	14	4	7	3	16	13	+3	19	
4	Wari Club	14	4	4	6	18	17	+1	16	
5	Farashganj SC	14	3	7	4	17	22	−5	16	
6	Agrani Bank SC	14	4	3	7	13	21	−8	15	
7	Victoria SC	14	3	6	5	11	22	−11	15	
8	Dhaka United SC (R)	14	2	5	7	11	21	−10	11	Relegation to 2014 Dhaka Senior Division League

Source: BFF
Rules for classification: 1) points; 2) goal difference; 3) number of goals scored.
(C) Champions; (P) Promoted; (R) Relegated
