= Dhaka First Division Football League (1993–2006) =

- Founded: 1993; 33 years ago (as the second-tier)
- First season: 1993
- Folded: 2006
- Country: Bangladesh
- Confederation: AFC
- Number of clubs: 8
- Level on pyramid: 2 (1993–2006)
- Promotion to: Dhaka Premier Division League
- Relegation to: Dhaka Second Division League
- Domestic cup: Federation Cup
- Last champions: Rahmatganj
- Most championships: Victoria (3 titles)

The Dhaka First Division Football League (1993–2006) was the second-tier football league in Bangladesh, administered by the Bangladesh Football Federation. Established as the top division of the Dhaka Football League during the British Raj, the First Division served as the country's top tier from 1971 to 1992 before being replaced by the Dhaka Premier Division Football League in 1993. Thereafter, it became the country's second-tier league.

In 2007, with the introduction of Bangladesh's first professional national football league, the Bangladesh Football League, the district-based First Division League was merged to the Dhaka Premier Division Football League, which was re-introduced as the new second-tier, the Dhaka Senior Division Football League, which eventually became the 3rd-tier from 2012.

== History ==
Following the BFF's introduction of the Premier Division, the top ten teams from the 1991–92 First Division qualified for the inaugural Premier Division in 1993. The clubs that finished 11th–18th, together with the top two teams from the 1991–92 Second Division, competed in the First Division, which became the second-tier. From 1993 onward, the Premier Division and First Division together formed the Senior Division of the Dhaka Football League, a term that had previously referred only to the First Division. Eligibility for continental competition, which had previously been awarded to the First Division champions, was transferred to the Premier Division champions. The First Division remained the second-tier beneath the Premier Division until 2006, although its final season was played in 2004–05.

Following the introduction of the country's first professional national league, the Bangladesh Football League (initially known as the B.League), in 2007, the Premier Division and First Division were merged into a single Senior Division. This competition served as the country's second tier while remaining a district-based league until 2011. It became the third tier in 2012 following the introduction of the Bangladesh Championship League, the country's second-tier professional national league.

== Statistics ==
=== Past winners ===
Season	Champions	Runner-up	Third place
1993	Fakirerpool	Bangladesh Boys	East End
1994	Rahmatganj	Farashganj	Victoria
1995	East End	Bangladesh Boys	Sadharan Bima
1996	Victoria	Rahmatganj	Badda Jagoroni
1997–98	Badda Jagoroni	Mirpur Chalantika	BRTC
1998	Not Held		
1999	Victoria	Dhanmondi	BRTC
2000	Agrani Bank	Fakirerpool	BRTC
2001	Victoria	Badda Jagoroni	Wari
2002	Dhaka Wanderers	Sheikh Russel	Wari
2003–04	Fakirerpool	Farashganj & Dipali	None
2005	Rahmatganj	Badda Jagoroni	Victoria
2005–06	Not Held		
2006–07	Not Held		

=== Top goalscorers ===
Season	Player	Team	Goals
1993	(Bangladesh) Mahmudul Haque Liton	East End	14
1995	(Bangladesh) Md Selim	Victoria	8
1996	(Bangladesh) Md Touhidur Rahman	Dhanmondi	13
1997–98	(Bangladesh) Saiful Islam Khokon	Badda Jagorani	22
1999	(Bangladesh) Md Sohel	Prantik	10
2000	(Bangladesh) Sohag (Bangladesh) Md Robi (Bangladesh) Sohag	Agrani Bank; Agrani Bank; Fakirerpool	8
2001	(Bangladesh) Azizur Rahman Sohag	Victoria	16
2002	(Bangladesh) Mamun (Bangladesh) Yusuf	Wari; Dhaka Wanderers	8
2003–04	(Nigeria) Charles Figo	Rahmatganj	14
2005	(Bangladesh) Ohidul	Agrani Bank	9

== See also ==
- Dhaka First Division Football League
- Dhaka Premier Division Football League
- Dhaka Senior Division Football League
