= 2023–24 Bangladesh Championship League =

12th Professional season of Bangladesh Championship League

Bangladesh Championship League
- Season: 2023–24
- Dates: 19 February–24 April 2024
- Champions: Fakirerpool YMC (2nd titles)
- Promoted: Fakirerpool YMC; Dhaka Wanderers
- Relegated: Uttara FC; Farashganj SC
- Matches: 56
- Goals: 131 (2.34 per match)
- Top goalscorer: 12 goals (Bangladesh) Rafayel Tudu (Fakirerpool YMC)
- Highest scoring: Farashganj SC 4–3 Uttara FC (16 April 2024)
- Longest winning run: 9 Matches; Fakirerpool YMC
- Longest unbeaten run: 9 Matches; Fakirerpool YMC
- Longest winless run: 8 Matches; Uttara FC
- Longest losing run: 8 Matches; Uttara FC

The 2023–24 Bangladesh Championship League, also known as the ABG Bashundhara Bangladesh Championship League for sponsorship reasons, was the 12th season of the Bangladesh Championship League, Bangladesh's second-tier professional football league. The season began on 19 February 2024 and concluded on 24 April 2024.

Brothers Union are the defending champions having won league title in the 2022–23 season.

== Venue ==
All matches will be played at the BSSS Mostafa Kamal Stadium in Dhaka, Bangladesh

Dhaka	Dhaka is located in Bangladesh
BSSS Mostafa Kamal Stadium	Dhaka is located in Bangladesh
Capacity: 25,000	Dhaka is located in Bangladesh

== Team changes ==
Eight teams competed in the league: six from the previous season, one promoted from the Dhaka Senior Division Football League, and one given direct entry. Originally, Somaj Kallyan KS Mugda and Jatrabari KC were to be promoted, but both failed to obtain the professional league license. Consequently, the third-place team, PWD Sports Club, was promoted. Farashganj SC, relegated from the 2021–22 Championship League, was given direct entry after receiving a license, despite not playing in the previous Senior Division League. These two clubs replaced Swadhinata KS and Little Friends Club, who were relegated the previous year. Muktijoddha Sangsad KC and AFC Uttara, relegated from the 2022–23 Premier League, chose not to participate, with Uttara facing FIFA sanctions. Gopalganj SC was barred from returning after withdrawing from the 2023–24 Premier League despite promotion, and Fortis FC Academy withdrew due to financial constraints.

=== To BCL ===
Relegated from the BPL

- ~~Muktijoddha Sangsad KC~~
- ~~AFC Uttara~~

Promoted from Dhaka Senior Division Football League

- ~~Somaj Kallyan KS Mugda~~
- ~~Jatrabari KC~~
- PWD Sports Club

Direct-entry

- Farashganj SC

=== From BCL ===
Promoted to the BPL

- Brothers Union
- ~~Gopalganj Sporting Club~~

Relegated to Dhaka Senior Division Football League

- Swadhinata KS
- Little Friends Club

Withdrawal

- Fortis FC Academy

== Team locations ==
Team	Location	Appearance
BFF Elite Academy	(Motijheel), Dhaka	3rd
Dhaka Wanderers	(Motijheel), Dhaka	4th
Fakirerpool YMC	(Motijheel), Dhaka	7th
Farashganj SC	(Farashganj), Dhaka	6th
NoFeL Sporting Club	Noakhali	5th
PWD Sports Club	(Segunbagicha), Dhaka	1st
Uttara FC	(Uttara), Dhaka	4th
Wari Club	(Motijheel), Dhaka	9th

=== Personnel and sponsoring ===
Team	Head coach	Captain	Kit manufacturer	Shirt sponsor (chest)
BFF Elite Football Academy	(England) Peter Butler	(Bangladesh) Md Parvej Ahmed		
Dhaka Wanderers Club	(Bangladesh) Abu Yusuf	(Bangladesh) Md Jahid Hossen		
Farashganj SC	(Bangladesh) Md Saiful Islam Chonchal	(Bangladesh) Ridoy Chondro Bormon		tubtoybd.com
Fakirerpool Young Men's Club	(Bangladesh) Md Imtiaz Khan Lablo	(Bangladesh) Md Rafikul Islam		
NoFeL Sporting Club	(Bangladesh) Kamal Babu	(Bangladesh) Md Razib		
PWD Sports Club	(Bangladesh) Md Anwar Hossain	(Bangladesh) Apu Ahmed		
Uttara FC	(Bangladesh) Md Anowar Hosan	(Bangladesh) Md Moinuddin		
Wari Club	(Bangladesh) Md Rasidul Islam Shamim	(Bangladesh) Md Rakib		Bashundhara Group

=== Coaching changes ===
Team	Outgoing head coach	Manner of departure	Date of vacancy	Position in the table	Incoming head coach	Date of appointment
Uttara FC	(Malaysia) Jacob M J Joseph	Unknown	18 March 2024	7th	(Bangladesh) Md Anowar Hosan	March 2024

== League table ==
Pos	Team	Pld	W	D	L	GF	GA	GD	Pts	BPL
1	Fakirerpool YMC (C, P)	14	8	3	3	28	14	+14	27	Qualification to 2024–25 Bangladesh Premier League
2	Dhaka Wanderers (P)	14	6	6	2	17	8	+9	24	Qualification to 2024–25 Bangladesh Premier League
3	PWD SC	14	6	5	3	20	14	+6	23	
4	BFF Elite Academy	14	6	4	4	20	18	+2	22	
5	Wari Club	14	5	5	4	14	9	+5	20	
6	NoFeL Sporting Club	14	3	8	3	9	11	−2	17	
7	Farashganj SC (R)	14	2	6	6	13	22	−9	12	Relegation to 2024–25 Dhaka Senior Division League
8	Uttara FC (R)	14	1	1	12	10	35	−25	4	Relegation to 2024–25 Dhaka Senior Division League

Source: Global Sports Archive
Rules for classification: 1) Points; 2) Goal difference; 3) Goals scored;
(C) Champions; (P) Promoted; (R) Relegated

== Results ==
=== Result table ===
No Home \ No Away	BEA	DWC	FSC	FYMC	NSC	PWD	UFC	WC
BFF Football Academy	—	3–2	1–0	0–6	1–3	2–2	5–0	0–1
Dhaka Wanderers	0–0	—	3–1	0–1	0–0	1–1	1–0	0–0
Farashganj SC	1–1	0–2	—	0–0	0–1	1–3	4–3	0–0
Fakirerpool YMC	2–3	0–4	4–1	—	1–1	2–1	4–1	3–1
NoFeL Sporting Club	0–0	1–1	1–1	0–0	—	0–2	0–3	0–1
PWD SC	1–0	0–1	2–2	1–4	0–0	—	2–0	3–1
Uttara FC	0–2	1–2	1–1	0–1	1–2	0–2	—	0–4
Wari Club	0–2	0–0	0–1	1–0	0–0	0–0	5–0	—

Source: Global Sports Archive
Legend: Blue = left column team win; Yellow = draw; Red = top row team win.

=== Positions by round ===
The following table lists the positions of teams after each week of matches. In order to preserve the chronological evolution, any postponed matches are not included to the round at which they were originally scheduled but added to the full round they were played immediately afterward.

Team ╲ Round	1	2	3	4	5	6	7	8	9	10	11	12	13	14
BFF Elite Academy	2	3	2	2	2	3	2	3	3	4	4	4	4	4
Dhaka WC	4	1	3	3	3	2	3	2	4	3	3	2	2	2
Farashganj SC	3	4	4	5	5	8	8	7	7	7	7	7	7	7
Fakirerpool YMC	6	8	6	4	4	4	4	4	2	2	2	1	1	1
NoFeL SC	8	7	7	7	7	6	6	6	6	6	6	6	5	6
PWD SC	1	2	1	1	1	1	1	1	1	1	1	3	3	3
Uttara FC	5	6	8	8	8	7	7	8	8	8	8	8	8	8
Wari Club	7	5	5	6	6	5	5	5	5	5	5	5	6	5

Leader
Runners-up
Relegation to Senior Division League

Source: Global Sports Archive

=== Results by games ===
Team ╲ Round	1	2	3	4	5	6	7	8	9	10	11	12	13	14
BFF Elite Academy	W	W	W	W	L	L	W	L	D	L	W	D	D	D
Dhaka WC	W	W	D	W	D	D	L	W	L	D	W	W	D	D
Farashganj SC	W	L	L	L	D	L	L	D	D	D	L	W	D	D
Fakirerpool YMC	L	L	W	D	L	W	W	W	W	W	D	W	D	W
NoFeL SC	L	L	D	D	W	L	W	D	D	D	D	D	W	D
PWD SC	W	W	W	W	D	W	L	D	W	D	D	L	D	L
Uttara FC	L	L	L	L	D	W	L	L	L	L	L	L	L	L
Wari Club	L	W	L	L	W	D	W	D	D	W	D	L	D	W

Source: Global Sports Archive
W = Win; D = Draw; L = Lose

== Season statistics ==
=== Goalscorers ===
There have been 131 goals scored in 56 matches, for an average of 2.34 goals per match. Source: Score7

Rank	Player	Club	Goals
1	Rafayel Tudu	Fakirerpool YMC	12
2	Dalim Barman	Fakirerpool YMC	9
3	Imran Hossain Pappu	Dhaka Wanderers Club	6
4	Safin Ahmed Shanto	Wari Club	4
4	Parvej Ahmed	BFF Elite Academy	4
4	Jakir Hossain Jiku	Dhaka Wanderers Club	4
4	Rumon Hossain	PWD SC	4
8	Md Faizullah	NoFeL SC	3
8	Md Rifat Kazi	BFF Elite Academy	3
8	Tonobir Mollik	Farashganj SC	3
8	Shubo Rajbongshi	Uttara FC	3
8	Md Jubayer Ahmaed	Wari Club	3
8	Salauddin Shahed	BFF Elite Academy	3
8	Minhazul Karim Shadin	Dhaka Wanderers Club	3
8	Asif Mahmud Rumon	PWD SC	3
8	Saifullah Sarder	Fakirerpool YMC	3
8	Sajidur Rahman	PWD SC	3
18	Md Ifran Hossain	Fakirerpool YMC	2
18	Salim Reza	Uttara FC	2
18	Zaker Hossain	NoFeL SC	2
18	Md Ali Hossain	Farashganj SC	2
18	Nazmul Huda Faysal	BFF Elite Academy	2
18	Siful Islam Rijon	PWD SC	2
18	Mahmudul Hasan	Wari Club	2
18	Joy Kumar	Uttara FC	2
18	Mohammed Nazim Uddin	BFF Elite Academy	2
27	Aswad Bin Walid Khan	Wari Club	1
27	Hira Ghose	Wari Club	1
27	Md Delowar Hasan Nehal	Wari Club	1
27	Joyonto Lal	PWD SC	1
27	Abu Sadek	Farashganj SC	1
27	Md Nazim Uddin Mithu	NoFeL SC	1
27	Md Shadhin	PWD SC	1
27	Md Ridoy Hossain	PWD SC	1
27	Md Sakib Chowdahury	Farashganj SC	1
27	Naky Chandra Das	Uttara FC	1
27	Md Ripon	BFF Elite Academy	1
27	Md Sohel	Farashganj SC	1
27	Tanin Sarker	PWD SC	1
27	Shofikul Islam	PWD SC	1
27	Akash Ali	Wari Club	1
27	Md Rakib Rahman	Fakirerpool YMC	1
27	Prakas Das	Farashganj SC	1
27	Md Manik	BFF Elite Academy	1
27	Md Shawon	Dhaka Wanderers Club	1
27	Md Sohag Mia	Dhaka Wanderers Club	1
27	Md Hasebul Hasan Santo	Wari Club	1
27	Elias Hasdak	Dhaka Wanderers Club	1
27	Iftiar Hossain	BFF Elite Academy	1
27	Md Labibur Rahman	Uttara FC	1
27	Md Al-Amin	Farashganj SC	1
27	Tarikul Islam	Uttara FC	1
27	Md Nazmul Ahmed Shakil	Farashganj SC	1
27	Sobuj Sheikh	NoFeL SC	1
27	Md Sagor	NoFeL SC	1
27	Mujahid Hossain Mollik	NoFeL SC	1
27	Akikul Islam	PWD SC	1
27	Abdullah Tofel	PWD SC	1
27	Md Habibullah Bashar	Dhaka Wanderers Club	1
27	Anik Hossain Siam	Fakirerpool YMC	1
27	Md Joy Ahmed	BFF Elite Academy	1
27	Md Sujon	Farashganj SC	1
27	Diderul Islam	PWD SC	1
27	Using Marma	BFF Elite Academy	1
Own Goals			2
Total			131

=== Own goals ===
† Bold Club indicates winner of the match.

Player	Club	Opponent	Result	Date	Source
(Bangladesh) Md Karim Uddin	Fakirerpool YMC	BFF Elite Academy	2–3	19 February 2024	
(Bangladesh) Anik Ahmed	PWD SC	Farashganj	3–1	29 February 2024	

=== Hat-tricks ===
Player	For	Against	Result	Date	Ref
(Bangladesh) Dalim Barman^{4}	Fakirerpool YMC	BFF Elite Academy	6–0	28 March 2024	
(Bangladesh) Rafayel Tudu^{4}	Fakirerpool YMC	Uttara FC	4–1	6 April 2024	

== Awards ==
=== Man of the Match ===
† Bold club indicates winner of the match.

- Source: Bangladesh Football Federation official Facebook page.

==== First Leg ====
Match no.	Player	Club	Opponent	Date
Round 1
1	(Bangladesh) Using Marma	BFF Elite Academy	Fakirerpool YMC	19 February 2024
2	(Bangladesh) Md Sujon	Farashganj SC	Wari Club	21 February 2024
3	(Bangladesh) Asif Mahmud Rumon	PWD SC	NoFeL SC	21 February 2024
4	(Bangladesh) Robel Mia	Dhaka Wanderers	Uttara FC	23 February 2024
Round 2
5	(Bangladesh) Shafin Ahmed Shanto	Wari Club	NoFeL SC	25 February 2024
6	(Bangladesh) Parvej Ahmed	BFF Elite Academy	Farashganj SC	25 February 2024
7	(Bangladesh) Rumon Hossain	PWD SC	Uttara FC	26 February 2024
8	(Bangladesh) Jakir Hossain Jiku	Dhaka Wanderers Club	Fakirerpool YMC	26 February 2024
Round 3
9	(Bangladesh) Md Nazim Uddin	BFF Elite Academy	Wari Club	29 February 2024
10	(Bangladesh) Siful Islam Rijon	PWD SC	Farashganj SC	29 February 2024
11	(Bangladesh) Anik Hossain Siam	Fakirerpool YMC	Uttara FC	1 March 2024
12	(Bangladesh) Md Faizullah	NoFeL SC	Dhaka Wanderers Club	1 March 2024
Round 4
13	(Bangladesh) Minhazul Karim Shadin	Dhaka Wanderers Club	Farashganj SC	4 March 2024
14	(Bangladesh) Safin Ahmed Shanto	Wari Club	PWD SC	4 March 2024
15	(Bangladesh) Parvej Ahmed	BFF Elite Academy	Uttara FC	5 March 2024
16	(Bangladesh) Shanto Tudu	Fakirerpool YMC	NoFeL SC	5 March 2024
Round 5
17	(Bangladesh) Md Razib	NoFeL SC	BFF Elite Academy	8 March 2024
18	(Bangladesh) Md Shahin Molla	Wari Club	Fakirerpool YMC	9 March 2024
19	(Bangladesh) Rumon Hossain	PWD SC	Dhaka Wanderers Club	9 March 2024
20	(Bangladesh) Tarikul Islam	Uttara FC	Farashganj SC	10 March 2024
Round 6
21	(Bangladesh) Mahmudul Hasan	Wari Club	Dhaka Wanderers Club	12 March 2024
22	(Bangladesh) Rumon Hossain	PWD SC	BFF Elite Academy	12 March 2024
23	(Bangladesh) Rafayel Tudu	Fakirerpool YMC	Farashganj SC	13 March 2024
24	(Bangladesh) Joy Kumar	Uttara FC	NoFeL SC	13 March 2024
Round 7
25	(Bangladesh) Md Faizullah	NoFeL SC	Farashganj SC	16 March 2024
26	(Bangladesh) Rafayel Tudu	Fakirerpool YMC	PWD SC	16 March 2024
27	(Bangladesh) Nazmul Huda Faysal	BFF Elite Academy	Dhaka Wanderers	17 March 2024
28	(Bangladesh) Mahmudul Hasan	Wari Club	Uttara FC	17 March 2024

==== Second Leg ====
Match no.	Player	Club	Opponent	Date
Round 8
29	(Bangladesh) Dalim Barman	Fakirerpool YMC	BFF Elite Academy	28 March 2024
30	(Bangladesh) Sobuj Sheikh	NoFeL SC	PWD SC	28 March 2024
31	(Bangladesh) Md Habibul Hasan Shanto	Wari Club	Farashganj SC	29 March 2024
32	(Bangladesh) Md Shawon	Dhaka Wanderers	Uttara FC	29 March 2024
Round 9
33	(Bangladesh) Md Rakib	Wari Club	NoFeL SC	1 April 2024
34	(Bangladesh) Prakas Das	BFF Elite Academy	Farashganj SC	1 April 2024
35	(Bangladesh) Asif Mahmud Rumon	PWD SC	Uttara FC	2 April 2024
36	(Bangladesh) Md Rakib Rahman	Fakirerpool YMC	Dhaka Wanderers Club	2 April 2024
Round 10
37	(Bangladesh) Akash Ali	Wari Club	BFF Elite Academy	4 April 2024
38	(Bangladesh) Shofikul Islam	PWD SC	Farashganj SC	5 April 2024
39	(Bangladesh) Minhazul Karim Shadin	NoFeL SC	Dhaka Wanderers Club	5 April 2024
40	(Bangladesh) Rafayel Tudu	Fakirerpool YMC	Uttara FC	6 April 2024
Round 11
41	(Bangladesh) Imran Hossain Pappu	Dhaka Wanderers Club	Farashganj SC	8 April 2024
42	(Bangladesh) Md Shahin Molla	Wari Club	PWD SC	8 April 2024
43	(Bangladesh) Salahuddin Shahed	BFF Elite Academy	Uttara FC	9 April 2024
44	(Bangladesh) Md Shaju Ahmed	Fakirerpool YMC	NoFeL SC	9 April 2024
Round 12
45	(Bangladesh) Md Razib	NoFeL SC	BFF Elite Academy	15 April 2024
46	(Bangladesh) Rafayel Tudu	Fakirerpool YMC	Wari Club	15 April 2024
47	(Bangladesh) Jakir Hossain Jiku	Dhaka Wanderers Club	PWD SC	16 April 2024
48	(Bangladesh) Md Al-Amin	Farashganj SC	Uttara FC	16 April 2024
Round 13
49	(Bangladesh) Md Yousuf Ali	Wari Club	Dhaka Wanderers Club	19 April 2024
50	(Bangladesh) Md Parvej Ahmed	BFF Elite Academy	PWD SC	19 April 2024
51	(Bangladesh) Rafikul Islam	Fakirerpool YMC	Farashganj SC	20 April 2024
52	(Bangladesh) Md Faizullah	NoFeL SC	Uttara FC	20 April 2024
Round 14
53	(Bangladesh) Md Miraj Hawladar	Farashganj SC	NoFeL SC	23 April 2024
54	(Bangladesh) Md Shaju Ahmed	Fakirerpool YMC	PWD SC	23 April 2024
55	(Bangladesh) Rayhan Ali	Dhaka Wanderers Club	BFF Elite Academy	24 April 2024
56	(Bangladesh) Md Shahin Molla	Wari Club	Uttara FC	24 April 2024

=== Referee of the month ===
Month	Name	Reference
February	(Bangladesh) Rimon Mahmud Zahid	
March	(Bangladesh) Taposh Ray	
April	(Bangladesh) Alamgir Sarkar	

=== Individual ===
Award	Player	Club	Reference
Highest Scorer	(Bangladesh) Rafayel Tudu	Fakirerpool YMC	
Most Valuable Player	(Bangladesh) Rafayel Tudu	Fakirerpool YMC	
Best Goalkeeper	(Bangladesh) Md Shaju Ahmed	Fakirerpool YMC	
Fair Play Trophy		BFF Elite Academy	

== See also ==
- 2023–24 Bangladesh Premier League (football)
- 2023–24 Bangladesh Women's Football League
