= Dhaka United Sports Club =

Bangladeshi association football club

- Full name: Dhaka United Sports Club
- Founded: 2012; 14 years ago
- Ground: BSSS Mostafa Kamal Stadium
- Capacity: 25,000
- Head Coach: Md Masud Alam Jahangir
- League: Dhaka Senior Division League
- 2025–26: 6th of 17
| Home colours | Away colours |

Dhaka United Sports Club (Bengali: ঢাকা ইউনাইটেড স্পোর্টস ক্লাব) is a Bangladeshi football club based in Dhaka. It currently competes in the Dhaka Senior Division League, the third-tier of Bangladeshi football.

== History ==
The club was founded in 2012 in Dhaka. In the 2013 season, they began competing in the Championship League, the country's second-tier football league. They were relegated to the Senior Division League, the semi-professional third-tier, in their debut season, losing 7 of their 14 games. They finished seventh in their first season in the third tier. In the 2017 edition, the Bangladesh Football Federation relegated Dhaka United and Friends Social Welfare Organisation after both clubs were found guilty of match-fixing. The clubs were fined Tk 50,000, and three players from United were suspended for varying terms due to their involvement in the fixed match, which allowed Friends Social Welfare Organisation to win and avoid relegation. Despite this, both clubs, along with the seemingly relegated Badda Jagoroni Sangsad, were allowed to compete in the 2018–19 Senior Division League after their relegations were overturned for reasons that remain unclear. Ultimately, the club finished rock-bottom that season, confirming their relegation. However, United did not enter the Second Division and instead were allowed to return to the Senior Division for the 2025–26 edition.

== Current squad ==
As of 20 November 2025

Note: Flags indicate national team as defined under FIFA eligibility rules; some limited exceptions apply. Players may hold more than one non-FIFA nationality.

| No. | Pos. | Nation | Player |
|---|---|---|---|
| 1 | GK | BAN | SM Ehsanul Ambil Sohan |
| 2 | DF | BAN | Muhammad Tanvirul Islam |
| 3 | DF | BAN | Abu Musa Bhuiyan |
| 4 | DF | BAN | Sauf Rahaman Shail |
| 5 | MF | BAN | Samrajul Islam Kaiser |
| 6 | MF | BAN | Jamim Hossain Anik |
| 7 | MF | BAN | Bijoy Chandra Shil |
| 8 | MF | BAN | Rahim Hasan Bitu |
| 9 | FW | BAN | Md Anwar Hossain |
| 10 | FW | BAN | Sohag Bormon (Captain) |
| 11 | FW | BAN | Md Rana Ahammed |
| 12 | FW | BAN | Johirul Islam |
| 13 | DF | BAN | Shri Apurrbo Das Shuvo |
| 14 | MF | BAN | Md Ragat Shekh |
| 15 | FW | BAN | Md Al Kafi |

| No. | Pos. | Nation | Player |
|---|---|---|---|
| 16 | DF | BAN | Md Nurnobi Somrat |
| 17 | MF | BAN | Moin Uddin |
| 18 | MF | BAN | Sojib Tanchngya |
| 19 | DF | BAN | Md Ayub |
| 20 | FW | BAN | Md Al Amin |
| 21 | FW | BAN | Md Mojahid |
| 23 | GK | BAN | Md Ibrahim |
| 27 | FW | BAN | Md Sakil Hossain Raju |
| 28 | MF | BAN | Paibon Mrong |
| 29 | DF | BAN | Md Rafiq Islam |
| 31 | GK | BAN | Md Abir Islam |
| 36 | DF | BAN | Md Tanvir Rahman |
| 37 | DF | BAN | Rony Kumar |
| 44 | DF | BAN | Md Elias Mia |
| 99 | GK | BAN | Risul Islam |

=== Head coach record ===
As of 21 January 2026

| Head Coach | From | To | P | W | D | L | GS | GA | %W |
|---|---|---|---|---|---|---|---|---|---|
| (Bangladesh) Md Masu Alam Jahangir | 5 August 2025 | Present | 16 | 8 | 3 | 5 | 21 | 14 | 50.00 |

== Personnel ==
=== Current coaching staff ===
As of 20 November 2025

| Position | Name |
|---|---|
| Team Manager | (Bangladesh) Md Khairul Basher Sumon |
| Head Coach | (Bangladesh) Md Masud Alam Jahangir |
| Team Leader | (Bangladesh) Md Reaz Uddin |
| Goalkeeping Coach | (Bangladesh) Maksudur Rahman Mostak |
| Medi Officer | (Bangladesh) Imam Hossain |
| Security Officer | (Bangladesh) Nazmul Hasan |
| Ball Boy | (Bangladesh) Jakir Hossain (Bangladesh) Md Ohid |

== See also ==
- List of football clubs in Bangladesh
- History of football in Bangladesh
