= Showkat Ali Selim =

Bangladeshi footballer

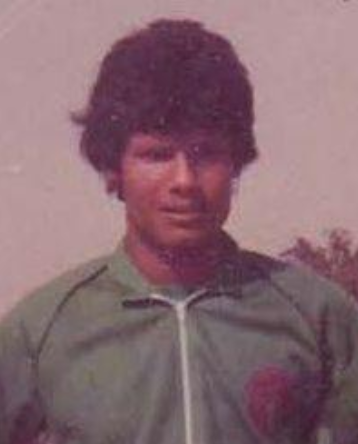
- Selim in 1985

Personal information
- Full name: Sheikh Mohammed Showkat Ali Selim
- Date of birth: 3 December 1963 (age 62)
- Place of birth: Dhaka, Bangladesh
- Position: Goalkeeper

Senior career*
Years	Team	Apps	(Gls)
1980–1981	Dhaka Abahani		
1982–1985	Victoria		
1986–1989	Muktijoddha Sangsad		
1989–1993	Dhaka Abahani		
1994	Wari Club		

International career
1988	Bangladesh U19	2	(0)
1990	Bangladesh	1	(0)
- * Club domestic league appearances and goals

Showkat Ali Selim (Bengali: শওকত আলী সেলিম; born 3 December 1963) is a retired Bangladeshi footballer who played as a goalkeeper. He represented the Bangladesh national team in 1990.

== Club career ==
Selim won the Dhaka First Division League with Dhaka Abahani in both 1989–90 and 1992.

== International career ==
Selim represented Bangladesh U19 at the 1988 AFC Youth Championship qualifiers against North Korea U19 over two matches. He was selected for the Bangladesh national team for the 1989 Bangladesh President's Gold Cup. He appeared in the final as replacement for the injured Sayeed Hassan Kanan, saving two penalties in the final shoot-out as Bangladesh defeated Korea University on penalties. The Korean side also included numerous notable players such as Seo Jung-won, Hong Myung-bo and Kim Byung-soo. His only official appearance for the national team came in a 0–3 defeat against Japan on 26 September 1990, in the Beijing Asian Games.

== Personal life ==
Selim is the son of Sheikh Shaheb Ali, former national footballer and the first coach of the Bangladesh national team.

== Honours ==
Dhaka Abahani

- Dhaka First Division League: 1989–90, 1992
- Independence Cup: 1989–90
