= Maksudur Rahman Mostak =

Bangladeshi footballer

Personal information
- Full name: Md Maksudur Rahman Mostak
- Date of birth: 19 October 1990 (age 36)
- Place of birth: Brahmanbaria, Bangladesh
- Height: 1.78 m (5 ft 10 in)
- Position: Goalkeeper

Youth career
- –2007: BKSP

Senior career*
| Years | Team | Apps | (Gls) |
| 2008–2010 | Arambagh KS | | |
| 2010–2012 | Muktijoddha Sangsad | | |
| 2012–2017 | Sheikh Jamal DC | | |
| 2017–2019 | Sheikh Russel KC | 11 | (0) |
| 2020 | Bashundhara Kings | 0 | (0) |
| 2021–2022 | Muktijoddha Sangsad | 4 | (0) |
| 2022–2025 | Mohammedan SC | 2 | (0) |

International career
| 2012 | Bangladesh | 2 | (0) |

Managerial career
- 2025–: Dhaka United SC (goalkeeping coach)
- * Club domestic league appearances and goals

Maksudur Rahman Mostak is a retired Bangladeshi professional footballer who played as a goalkeeper.
