= Nobabpur KC =

Association football club based in Dhaka, Bangladesh

Nobabpur KC নবাবপুর কেসি
- Full name: Nobabpur Krira Chakra
- Short name: NKC
- Founded: 2001; 25 years ago
- Ground: BSSS Mostafa Kamal Stadium
- Capacity: 25,000
- General Secretary: Imran Hasan Khan
- Head Coach: Mizanur Rahman Dawn
- League: Dhaka Senior Division League
- 2025–26: 16th of 17 (Relegated)
Home colours	Away colours

Nobabpur Krira Chakra (Bengali: নবাবপুর কেসি), also referred as Nawabpur KC, is a Bangladeshi football club based in Nobabpur, Dhaka. It currently competes in the Dhaka Senior Division League, the third-tier of Bangladeshi football.

== Current squad ==
As of 3 November 2025

Note: Flags indicate national team as defined under FIFA eligibility rules; some limited exceptions apply. Players may hold more than one non-FIFA nationality.

No.	Pos.	Nation	Player
1	GK	BAN	Prodip Kumar
2	DF	BAN	Misbah Uddin
3	DF	BAN	Sumon Biswas
4	DF	BAN	Md Sohel Rana
5	DF	BAN	Ekramul Haque
6	MF	BAN	Rejaul Karim
7	MF	BAN	Md Shagar
8	MF	BAN	Md Zeon Sarker
9	FW	BAN	Sabuj Roy
10	FW	BAN	Md Toriqul Islam Jufikar (Captain)
11	FW	BAN	Md Anik Hossain
12	MF	BAN	Ariful Islam
13	DF	BAN	Md Noyon Holader
14	MF	BAN	Md Safayet Bishwas
15	MF	BAN	Bijoy Chandra Shil
16	MF	BAN	Muhammad Razib
17	MF	BAN	Mohammed Arman
18	DF	BAN	Proloy Chandra Das
19	FW	BAN	Sayef Hosen Joy
20	FW	BAN	Kaftus Taius

No.	Pos.	Nation	Player
21	FW	BAN	Md Sarjan Mia
22	GK	BAN	Md Aminul Islam Rony
23	DF	BAN	Md Roton
25	GK	BAN	Mohammad Jobir
27	DF	BAN	Jahangir Alom
28	DF	BAN	Md Mokter Hossain
30	GK	BAN	Md Miraj Sarder
33	DF	BAN	Sajjadul Islam
40	DF	BAN	Md Hasib Zidan
44	MF	BAN	Rafayat Mashrafi
50	FW	BAN	Mubbashir Ebnay Mamun Jahin
55	DF	BAN	Mohammad Rabbi Kha
70	MF	BAN	Rabbi Hossain
77	MF	BAN	Mohammad Habibullah
99	MF	BAN	Md Omor Faruk

== Personnel ==
=== Current coaching staff ===
As of 1 July 2024

Position	Name
Team Manager	(Bangladesh) Abul Hossain Pappu
Team Leader	(Bangladesh) SM Mamun Ar Rashid
Assistant Manager	(Bangladesh) Tanvir Hossain Bhuiyan
Head Coach	(Bangladesh) Monowar Hossain
Assistant Coach	(Bangladesh) Nipu Das
Media Manager	(Bangladesh) Md Monir Hossain Sardar
Equipment Manager	(Bangladesh) Md Lutfor Rahman
Ball Boy	(Bangladesh) Md Yeasin Santo

== Team records ==
=== Head coaches records ===
As of 19 January 2026

Head Coach	From	To	P	W	D	L	GS	GA	%W
(Bangladesh) Monowar Hossain	1 May 2024	Present	6	1	4	1	4	4	16.67
(Bangladesh) Mizanur Rahman Dawn	10 August 2025	Present	16	3	2	11	8	30	18.75

== Honours ==
- Dhaka Second Division League
  - Champions (1): 2017
- Dhaka Third Division League
  - Champions (1): 2013
- Pioneer League
  - Champions (1): 2011
