= Arambagh FA =

Bangladeshi Association football club

Arambagh Football Academy
- Full name: Arambagh Football Academy
- Founded: 1981; 45 years ago
- Ground: BSSS Mostafa Kamal Stadium
- Capacity: 25,000
- President: Md Farhad Hossain
- Head Coach: Tipu Sultan
- League: Dhaka Senior Division League
- 2025–26: 13th of 17
Home colours	Away colours

Arambagh Football Academy (Bengali: আরামবাগ ফুটবল একাডেমি) is the junior team of the Dhaka based club Arambagh KS. It currently competes in Dhaka Senior Division League, the third-tier of Bangladeshi football, alongside its main team.

== History ==
=== 1981–2017 ===
In 1981, Arambagh Krira Sangha formed a junior team to participate in the inaugural Pioneer Football League. The team became champions in 1984 defeating Aminbazar Club 2–1 in the final, and earned promotion to the Third Division. Nonetheless, the team were relegated and returned to competing in the Pioneer League within a season.

In 2014, the team won the Under 10-12 Football Festival arranged by the Bangladesh Football Federation (BFF). In 2016, after a 31-year absence, the team coached by Ibrahim Khalil Kala returned to the Third Division as champions of the Pioneer League once again. In the final held at Bangabandhu National Stadium, they defeated Gazipur City Football Academy 2–0.

=== 2018–present ===
In their first season back in the Third Division, the club became champions of the league held in 2018, earning a total of 23 points to secure their place in the Second Division. The team entered the Second Division in the 2021–22 season, finishing seventh in their group of nine teams. The club earned 22 points from 14 games in the 2022–23 season and were bound to finish third. However, after the original runners-up, BKSP, were disqualified in the 12th round, Arambagh clinched promotion to the Senior Division as the runners-up. In the league table published by the BFF, Arambagh finished with a negative goal difference, scoring four times and conceding eight. Arambagh Football Academy currently participates in the Dhaka Senior Division League 2025–26 season, the third tier of the Bangladeshi football pyramid, fielding its senior and junior combined team in the competition and holding the 13th position of the league table.

== Current squad ==
As of 2 November 2025

Note: Flags indicate national team as defined under FIFA eligibility rules; some limited exceptions apply. Players may hold more than one non-FIFA nationality.

No.	Pos.	Nation	Player
1	GK	BAN	Abdullah Al Mahbub
2	DF	BAN	Jahid Hasan
3	DF	BAN	Md Rezaul Karim
4	DF	BAN	Md Tarikul Islam
5	DF	BAN	Md Habibur Rahman Tutul (Captain)
6	DF	BAN	Farhan Morshed Emon
7	MF	BAN	Md Magdad Ali
8	MF	BAN	Mohammad Emranul Hoque
9	FW	BAN	Nurul Alam
10	FW	BAN	Ajanta Chakma
11	FW	BAN	Md Shorgo Molla
12	DF	BAN	Md Tuhin Ali Shovo
13	FW	BAN	Md Rajiur Rahman Raju
14	DF	BAN	Md Rabbi Yasin Emon
15	DF	BAN	Ifti Hasan
16	MF	BAN	Hridoy Das
17	MF	BAN	Md Tuhin Mia
18	FW	BAN	Md Mohinul Hoque

No.	Pos.	Nation	Player
19	FW	BAN	Md Reyad Hossen
20	FW	BAN	Mahim Uzzaman
21	DF	BAN	Mohammed Nayem Fayez Fahim
22	GK	BAN	Ragib-Al-Anzum Nirob (Captain)
23	DF	BAN	Md Sadman Sakib Sawon
24	DF	BAN	Sheikh Shadman Sakib Purno
25	GK	BAN	Md Zia Uddin Zia
26	MF	BAN	Md Nihad Mia
27	MF	BAN	Abdullah Al Hasan
28	FW	BAN	Md Shohan Shek
29	FW	BAN	Sheikh Farid
30	GK	BAN	Shibolee Chakma
97	FW	BAN	Akash Ishraque

== Personnel ==
=== Current technical staff ===
As of 15 January 2026

Position	Name
Team Manager	(Bangladesh) Md Abdus Sattar
Head Coach	(Bangladesh) Md Tipu Sultan
Team Leader	(Bangladesh) Md Sumon
Technical Director	(Bangladesh) Md Riaz Aftab Sunny
Assistant Manager	(Bangladesh) Md Biplob Hossain Mitu
Media Manager	(Bangladesh) Md. Yeasin Molla
Security Officer	(Bangladesh) Md Anowar Hossain Bappy
Equipment Manager	(Bangladesh) Md Mohiuddin Joy
Ball Boy	(Bangladesh) Mainuddin Emon

== Team records ==
=== Head coach record ===
As of 18 January 2026

Head Coach	From	To	P	W	D	L	GS	GA	%W
(Bangladesh) Muhammad Asraful Haque	25 June 2024	31 December 2024	6	4	2	0	9	3	66.67
(Bangladesh) Tipu Sultan	1 August 2025	Present	16	4	4	8	18	27	25.00

== Honours ==
- Dhaka Second Division League
  - Runners-up (1): 2022–23
- Dhaka Third Division League
  - Champions (1): 2018
- Pioneer League
  - Champions (2): 1984, 2016
