= East End Club =

East End Club ইষ্ট এণ্ড ক্লাব
- Full name: East End Club
- Short name: EEC
- Founded: 1933; 93 years ago
- Ground: Dhupkhola field, Gendaria
- Convener: Morshed Ahmed Chowdhury
- Head Coach: Md Shahadat Hossain
- League: Dhaka Senior Division League
- 2025–26: 10th of 17
Home colours	Away colours

East End Club (Bengali: ইষ্ট এণ্ড ক্লাব) is a Bangladeshi football club based in the Gendaria, Dhaka. It currently competes in the Dhaka Senior Division League, the third-tier of Bangladeshi football.

== History ==
The East End Welfare Association was established in 1886 in Gendaria, Dhaka. The association inaugurated its own sports club, the East End Club, in 1933.The Dhaka Sporting Association's 42nd annual report for 1937–38 mentions the club's participation in the Dhaka Third Division Football League prior to the Partition of India.

In 1953, the club won the Dhaka Second Division Football League under the captaincy of Abdul Hamid and entered the First Division Football League the following year.

The club's most notable achievement following the Independence of Bangladesh was finishing as runners-up in the inaugural Independence Cup, where they lost to Mohammedan SC in the final.

In 1975, the club pushed for a title charge, defeating the likes of Mohammedan and Brothers Union. However, they missed out on the league title due to alleged political influences affecting their form in the league's second-leg. The club faced its initial relegation from the top-tier in 1986.

== Current squad ==
As of 8 November 2025

Note: Flags indicate national team as defined under FIFA eligibility rules; some limited exceptions apply. Players may hold more than one non-FIFA nationality.

No.	Pos.	Nation	Player
1	GK	BAN	Nur Mohammad
2	DF	BAN	Md Saiful Isalam
3	DF	BAN	Taposh Biswas
4	DF	BAN	Md Shahin Alam
5	DF	BAN	Md Mahadee Hasan
6	MF	BAN	Md Shawon Ali (Captain)
7	MF	BAN	Ruhul Amin
8	MF	BAN	Md Foyjul Karim Shawon
9	FW	BAN	Mehedi Hasan
10	FW	BAN	Robiul Mojumder
11	FW	BAN	Md Rasel Hossen Sumon
13	FW	BAN	Md Rajib Mia
14	DF	BAN	Abu Daud Emon
15	DF	BAN	Shakil Hossain
16	MF	BAN	Md Shoriful Islam
17	MF	BAN	Md Abu Nayeem
18	FW	BAN	Sujon Mia

No.	Pos.	Nation	Player
19	DF	BAN	Sadin Bishas
20	FW	BAN	Md Riyad Hossen
21	FW	BAN	Parves Mia
22	GK	BAN	Yasin Khalashi
23	DF	BAN	Md Abu Hasan
24	MF	BAN	Md Farhad Hasan
25	FW	BAN	Md Zomzom Akhter
26	FW	BAN	Md Sifat Hossain
27	MF	BAN	Abdur Rahim Matubbar
28	FW	BAN	Shaikh Sohag Hossain
30	GK	BAN	Md Shakil Hossain
32	FW	BAN	Md Mainul Islam
34	FW	BAN	Azman Faik
35	DF	BAN	Muhammad Salman Farchi
40	GK	BAN	Didarul Islam
47	DF	BAN	Arafat Hossain
77	FW	BAN	Md Juel Rana

== Personnel ==
=== Current technical staff ===
As of 18 July 2024

Position	Name
Team Manager	(Bangladesh) Md Liakot Ali Bhuyan
Team Leader	(Bangladesh) Md Ataur Rahman Khan
Assistant Manager	(Bangladesh) Mirza Munsur Ali
Head Coach	(Bangladesh) Md Shahadat Hossain
Goalkeeping Coach	(Bangladesh) Md Meraz
Media Manager	(Bangladesh) Delower Hossain Sonet
Equipment Manager	(Bangladesh) Syed Rafiqul Islam
Security Officer	(Bangladesh) Jarif Ahmed
Ball Boy	(Bangladesh) Md Rafsan

=== Managerial statistics ===
As of 21 January 2026

Head Coach	From	To	P	W	D	L	GS	GA	%W
(Bangladesh) Md Shahdat Hossain	1 April 2024	Present	23	6	11	6	17	16	26.09

== Other departments ==
=== Volleyball ===
East End Club volleyball team currently participates in the Dhaka First Division Volleyball League under the Bangladesh Volleyball Federation. Prior to their relegation, they had participated in the Dhaka Premier Division Volleyball League.

=== Cricket ===
The club's cricket team is now defunct and most recently participated in the Dhaka Second Division Cricket League in 2008.

== Honours ==
- Dhaka First Division League
  - Champions (1): 1995
- Dhaka Second Division League
  - Champions (2): 1953, 1967

== Notable players ==
- The players below had senior international cap(s) for their respective countries. Players whose name is listed, represented their countries before or after playing for East End Club.

Asia

- (Nepal) Raju Kaji Shakya (1995–97)

== See also ==
- List of football clubs in Bangladesh
- History of football in Bangladesh
