= T&T Club Motijheel =

Bangladeshi association football club

T&T Club টিএন্ডটি ক্লাব
- Full name: T&T Club Motijheel
- Nicknames: T&T
- Founded: 1962; 64 years ago
- Owner: BTCL
- Chief Advisor: Fazlur Rahman Babul
- Head Coach: Robiul Hasan Khan Mona
- League: Dhaka Senior Division Football League
- 2025–26: 17th of 17 (Relegated)

T&T Club Motijheel (Bengali: টিএন্ডটি ক্লাব মতিঝিল) is an association football club from Motijheel, Bangladesh. The club competes in the Dhaka Senior Division Football League.

== History ==
The club was established in 1962 by Pakistan Telegraph and Telephone Department (currently Bangladesh Telecommunications Company Limited) during East Pakistan era.

The club house was vandalized by Rajakars during Bangladesh Liberation War.

== Current squad ==
As of 16 July 2024

Note: Flags indicate national team as defined under FIFA eligibility rules; some limited exceptions apply. Players may hold more than one non-FIFA nationality.

No.	Pos.	Nation	Player
1	GK	BAN	Md Hamidul Islam
2	DF	BAN	Md Momin
3	DF	BAN	Firoz Hossain
4	DF	BAN	Nahid Parvez
5	DF	BAN	Hasan Ahmed Mujtaba
6	MF	BAN	Md Mahedi Hasan
7	MF	BAN	Tanvir Ahmed Apon
8	MF	BAN	Md Abdullah Al Masud
9	FW	BAN	Md Anawer Hossain
10	MF	BAN	Md Sazzad Hossen (Captain)
11	MF	BAN	Md Moshirur Rahman
12	MF	BAN	Md Sufian
13	DF	BAN	Ucchas Ahmed Bappy
14	DF	BAN	Md Saydul Islam Sumon
15	MF	BAN	Md Abdullah Al Mamun
16	MF	BAN	Md Kamrul Hasan
17	MF	BAN	Md Jamil Badsha Anik
18	MF	BAN	Md Soriful Islam

No.	Pos.	Nation	Player
19	FW	BAN	Md Tanzil Islam
20	MF	BAN	Md Sajjat Hossain
21	GK	BAN	Abdul Awlat Siojib
22	GK	BAN	Mosharaf Hossain
23	GK	BAN	Md Hakim Mia
25	MF	BAN	Md Al Amin Madbar
26	MF	BAN	Abdul Malek
27	FW	BAN	Md Shakhawat Hossain
30	FW	BAN	Rashik Monsur
33	DF	BAN	Md Salauddin Tolan
44	DF	BAN	Md Soriful Islam
55	MF	BAN	Abu Jakaria
66	MF	BAN	Afif Bin Alamgir
75	MF	BAN	Md Joy
77	DF	BAN	Md Juntoo Mia
80	MF	BAN	Bappy Sheikh
99	MF	BAN	Md Manik Mia

== Personnel ==
=== Current coaching staff ===
As of 18 July 2024

Position	Name
Team Manager	(Bangladesh) Md Habibur Rahman
Team Leader	(Bangladesh) Md Abdur Rahman
Assistant Manager	(Bangladesh) Azizul Karim
Head Coach	(Bangladesh) Robiul Hasan Khan Mona
Assistant Coach	(Bangladesh) Md Golam Rahman
Media Manager	(Bangladesh) Ali Aksar Linkon
Equipment Manager	(Bangladesh) Harun Rashid
Fitness Trainer	(Bangladesh) Md Sayeed
Ball Boy	(Bangladesh) Mahmudul Hasan

== Team records ==
=== Coaching records ===
As of 19 January 2026

Head Coach	From	To	P	W	D	L	GS	GA	%W
(Bangladesh) Robiul Hasan Khan Mona	29 May 2024	Present	22	5	5	12	15	53	22.73

== Honours ==
- Dhaka Second Division League
  - Runners-up (1): 2009
- Dhaka Third Division League
  - Champions (1): 1996
- Pioneer League
  - Runners-up (1): 1993
