= Swadhinata KS =

Bangladeshi association football club

Swadhinata KS স্বাধীনতা ক্রীড়া সংঘ
- Full name: Swadhinata Krira Shangha
- Founded: 2005; 21 years ago
- Ground: BSSS Mostafa Kamal Stadium
- Capacity: 25,000
- Owner: Rubayeet E Ferdous
- General secretary: Syed Saifur Rahman Tulu
- Head coach: Md Ashraful Haque
- League: Dhaka Senior Division Football League
- 2025–26: 12th of 17

Swadhinata Krira Sangha (Bengali: স্বাধীনতা ক্রীড়া সংঘ, Bengali pronunciation: [ʃadʱinɔta kriɽa ʃɔŋɡʱo]) is a Bangladeshi association football club based in Dhaka. They currently compete in the Dhaka Senior Division Football League, the third tier of Bangladeshi football, following relegation from the 2021–22 Bangladesh Premier League.

== History ==
Season	League	Performance	Note
2018–19	BCL	11/11	Bottom-placed Swadhinata KS was relegated to First Division League from BCL.
2020–21	BCL	Champion	BFF decided to keep Swadhinata KS in BCL, despite the club being relegated in the previous season with a bottom-ranked finish. On 18 July 2021, Swadhinata clinched the 12-team second-tier league title after a goalless draw against Agrani Bank in their last match of the league and got their first-ever promotion in BPL.
2021–22	BPL	12th of 12 (relegated)	

== Current squad ==
As of 26 October 2025

Note: Flags indicate national team as defined under FIFA eligibility rules; some limited exceptions apply. Players may hold more than one non-FIFA nationality.

No.	Pos.	Nation	Player
1	GK	BAN	Mohammad Jahidul Karim
3	DF	BAN	Md Abdullah Al Mamun Salman
4	DF	BAN	Mohammad Ekramul Hosen
5	DF	BAN	Firoz Ahammad
7	MF	BAN	Md Mir Habib Hossan Sojib
8	MF	BAN	Badhon
9	FW	BAN	Md Saifullah
10	FW	BAN	Rimon Babu
11	FW	BAN	Md Alif Nur (Captain)
12	FW	BAN	Md Seyam Hossain
13	FW	BAN	Safat Shikder
14	DF	BAN	Fahim Uddin
15	DF	BAN	Md Monabirul Islam
16	DF	BAN	Md Mostakim Ali
17	DF	BAN	Md Forhadul Islam Jobaer
18	DF	BAN	Bayazid Mustofa
19	DF	BAN	Md Shagor Mia
20	MF	BAN	Nur Uddin Shazal
21	FW	BAN	Saydul Hasan Sahed
22	MF	BAN	Alhaz Uddin

No.	Pos.	Nation	Player
23	FW	BAN	Toaha Shikder Nadim
24	DF	BAN	Md Juel Rahman
25	GK	BAN	Abdul Kader Munna
26	FW	BAN	Ikbal Khan
27	DF	BAN	Abdullah Al Jobayer Mahi
28	GK	BAN	Md Jannatul Nayeem Parvege
29	FW	BAN	Md Mehedi Hasan
30	GK	BAN	Roni Basfor
31	MF	BAN	Md Munna Mia
32	MF	BAN	Chandan Shil
33	MF	BAN	Samimul Islam Babu
34	MF	BAN	Abdullah Mohammad Babu
35	MF	BAN	Raton Mia

== Personnel ==
=== Current coaching staff ===
As of 27 July 2024

Position	Name
Team Manager	(Bangladesh) Mohammad Sohel Mia
Team Leader	(Bangladesh) Md Mizan Uddin
Assistant Manager	(Bangladesh) Humayun Kabir
Head Coach	(Bangladesh) Kamal Babu
Assistant Coach	(Bangladesh) Forhad Hossain
Goalkeeping Coach	(Bangladesh) Kazi Rajoyan Hossain
Fitness Trainer	(Bangladesh) Arif Chowdhury
Physio	(Bangladesh) Md Mahmudur Rahman
Ball Boy	(Bangladesh) Sumon Chandra Das

== Team records ==
=== Head coaches' record ===
As of 18 January 2026

Coach	From	To	P	W	D	L	GS	GA	%W
(Bangladesh) Masud Alam Jahangir	1 February 2021	30 September 2022	62	21	13	28	72	81	33.87
(Bangladesh) Kamal Babu	10 May 2024	30 September 2025	6	1	2	3	3	9	16.67
(Bangladesh) Md Ashraful Haque	1 July 2025	Present	16	4	5	7	15	23	25.00

P – Total of played matches W – Won matches D – Drawn matches L – Lost matches GS – Goals scored GA – Goals against
%W – Percentage of matches won

== Honours ==
=== League ===
- Bangladesh Championship League
  - Winners (1): 2020–21
- Senior Division League
  - Winners (1): 2017
