= Jatrabari KC =

Association football club based in Dhaka, Bangladesh

Jatrabari KC যাত্রাবাড়ী কেসি
- Full name: Jatrabari Krira Chakra
- Short name: JKC
- Owner: Md Shisir Khan
- President: Kalam Khan
- Head Coach: Arman Hossain
- League: Dhaka Senior Division League
- 2025–26: Champion (Promoted)
Home colours	Away colours

Jatrabari Krira Chakra (Bengali: যাত্রাবাড়ী ক্রীড়া চক্র) is a Bangladeshi football club based in Jatrabari, Dhaka. It currently competes in the Dhaka Senior Division League, the third-tier of the Bangladeshi football league system.

== History ==
The club ended the 2021–22 Dhaka Senior Division League as runners-up and gained promotion to the 2023–24 Bangladesh Championship League, the country's second-tier professional league. However, they decided against participating in the league due to financial constraints and failure to attain professional league license. Eventually the club remained in the Senior Division, and continued their football activities from the following league season, held in 2023–24.

== Current squad ==
As of 20 September 2025

Note: Flags indicate national team as defined under FIFA eligibility rules; some limited exceptions apply. Players may hold more than one non-FIFA nationality.

No.	Pos.	Nation	Player
1	GK	BAN	Md Rakib Hossain
2	MF	BAN	Bijoy Sarkar
3	DF	BAN	Atikur Rahman Azad
4	DF	BAN	Md Ariful Islam (Captain)
6	DF	BAN	Md Rashed Babu
7	MF	BAN	Jahidul Hasan Dalim
8	MF	BAN	Md Mokarom Hossen
9	FW	BAN	Alamin Hossain
10	FW	BAN	Mohammed Helal
11	FW	BAN	Md Nayeem Shaikh
12	FW	BAN	Md Sabuj Mia
14	MF	BAN	Mohammad Dipu Rayhan
15	DF	BAN	Md Nasir Shaikh
16	DF	BAN	Israfil Al Eimon
17	DF	BAN	Md Nuruzzaman Sarkar
18	DF	BAN	Kabir Choudhury
19	FW	BAN	Md Riazul Islam
20	FW	BAN	Belal Ahmed

No.	Pos.	Nation	Player
21	FW	BAN	Md Umran Mia
22	GK	BAN	Md Anisul Haque Rana
23	DF	BAN	Md Rubel Islam
24	DF	BAN	Alamgir Hossain
25	FW	BAN	Md Rakibul Islam
26	FW	BAN	Md Hridoy
27	FW	BAN	Abdul Malek
28	MF	BAN	Md Sajibul Islam
29	MF	BAN	Alim Uddin Mia
30	FW	BAN	Md Mahfuz Hossain
31	FW	BAN	Meraz Hosaain
32	FW	BAN	Md Shahedul Alam
33	FW	BAN	Md Sabuj Hossain
34	MF	BAN	Md Mursalim
35	MF	BAN	Md Emam Mehedi
36	DF	BAN	Md Sohel Hossain Mim
40	GK	BAN	Santo Roy

== Personnel ==
=== Current technical staff ===
As of 25 July 2024

Position	Name
Team Manager	(Bangladesh) Md Jahangir Munir
Team Leader	(Bangladesh) Mohammad Mostak Ahmed
Assistant Manager	(Bangladesh) Md Helal Uddin
Head Coach	(Bangladesh) Imtiaz Khan Lablu
Assistant Coach	(Bangladesh) Md Akter Hossain
Media Manager	(Bangladesh) Md Maruf Mahmud
Equipment Manager	(Bangladesh) Md Salahuddin Mahmud
Security Officer	(Bangladesh) Jarif Ahmed
Trainer	(Bangladesh) Mohammad Ullah Dalim
Ball Boy	(Bangladesh) Ashraful Alam Manik

== Team records ==
=== Head coach records ===
As of 19 January 2026

Head Coach	From	To	P	W	D	L	GS	GA	%W
(Bangladesh) Sayed Labib Hasan	20 June 2022	5 February 2023	13	8	3	2	18	4	61.54
(Bangladesh) Imtiaz Khan Lablu	1 May 2024	10 August 2025	6	2	2	2	3	3	33.33
(Bangladesh) Arman Hossain	20 July 2025	Present	16	12	4	0	36	6	75.00

== Honours ==
- Dhaka Senior Division League
  - Runners-up (1): 2021–22
- Dhaka Second Division League
  - Champions (1): 2004–05
- Dhaka Third Division League
  - Runners-up (1): 1996
- Pioneer League
  - Champions (1): 1995
