= Mohakhali Ekadosh =

Association football club based in Dhaka, Bangladesh

Mohakhali Ekadosh মহাখালী একাদশ
- Full name: Mohakhali Ekadosh
- Nickname: Mohakhali XI
- Short name: ME
- Founded: 1985; 41 years ago
- Ground: BSSS Mostafa Kamal Stadium
- Capacity: 25,000
- General Secretary: Syed Farhan Islam Rana
- Head Coach: Md Shofikul Hasan Polash
- League: Dhaka Senior Division League
- 2025–26: 2nd of 17 (Promoted)
Home colours	Away colours

Mohakhali Ekadosh (Bengali: মহাখালী একাদশ) is a Bangladeshi football club based in Mohakhali, Dhaka. It currently competes in the Dhaka Senior Division League, the third-tier of Bangladeshi football.

== Current squad ==
As of 30 October 2025

Note: Flags indicate national team as defined under FIFA eligibility rules; some limited exceptions apply. Players may hold more than one non-FIFA nationality.

No.	Pos.	Nation	Player
1	GK	BAN	Md Mustafezur Rahman
2	DF	BAN	Md Saikat Hossain
3	DF	BAN	Md Rasel Hosen
4	DF	BAN	Md Rezaul Islam Nizam
5	DF	BAN	Arman Sadi
6	MF	BAN	Md Khairul Islam
7	MF	BAN	Md Imran Islam Anu (Captain)
8	MF	BAN	Md Hossain Ali
9	FW	BAN	Md Khalilur Rahman
10	FW	BAN	Kounik Ahmed
11	FW	BAN	Rashedul Islam Jihan
12	FW	BAN	Sabbere Hossain
13	FW	BAN	Md Zakirul Islam
14	DF	BAN	Md Mustafijur Rahman
15	DF	BAN	Md Rony Mia
16	DF	BAN	Tanjim Islam
17	MF	BAN	Prodip Soren

No.	Pos.	Nation	Player
18	FW	BAN	Md Nayeem Imran
19	FW	BAN	Hridoy Kumar Das
20	FW	BAN	Apon Chandro Roy
21	DF	BAN	Saidul Islam
22	GK	BAN	Md Golam Rabbi
23	DF	BAN	Ridoy Basfor
24	FW	BAN	Robel Sarkar
25	FW	BAN	Sajib Mia
26	MF	BAN	Shahriar Ahamed Shuvo
27	DF	BAN	Ahnaf Rahman
28	MF	BAN	Joy Kumar Nitai
29	DF	BAN	Md Nazmul Hasan
30	GK	BAN	SK Kazibur Rahman
31	FW	BAN	Sabbir Ahammed Opurbo
33	GK	BAN	Mahin Rana
35	FW	BAN	Nur Uddin Manik

== Personnel ==
=== Current coaching staff ===
As of 30 July 2024

Position	Name
Team Manager	(Bangladesh) SM Kamal Hasan
Team Leader	(Bangladesh) Mostaque Pasha Milon
Assistant Manager	(Bangladesh) Md Salim Ullah
Head Coach	(Bangladesh) Md Shofikul Islam Polash
Assistant Coach	(Bangladesh) Md Kofil Uddin
Trainer	(Bangladesh) Raisul Islam Chanchal
Fitness Coach	(Bangladesh) Md Delower Hossain
Equipment Manager	(Bangladesh) Md Faruk Uddin
Ball Boy	(Bangladesh) Md Al Amin

== Team records ==
=== Head coach records ===
As of 19 January 2026

Head Coach	From	To	P	W	D	L	GS	GA	%W
(Bangladesh) Md Shofikul Islam Polash	20 April 2024	Present	16	11	3	2	41	16	68.75

== Honours ==
- Dhaka Second Division League
  - Champions (1): 2002
- Dhaka Third Division League
  - Champions (1): 1989–90
- Pioneer League
  - Runners-up (1): 1987

== See also ==
- List of football clubs in Bangladesh
- History of football in Bangladesh
