= Sadharan Bima CSC =

Sadharan Bima CSC সাধারণ বীমা সিএসসি
- Full name: Sadharan Bima Corporation Sporting Club
- Short name: SBCSC
- Founded: 1973; 53 years ago
- Owner: Sadharan Bima Corporation
- President: Abdul Barek
- Head Coach: Monowar Hossain
- League: Dhaka Senior Division League
- 2025–26: Senior Division League 3rd of 17
Home colours	Away colours

Sadharan Bima CSC (Bengali: সাধারণ বীমা সিএসসি) is a Bangladeshi football club based in Dhaka. It currently competes in the Dhaka Senior Division League, the third-tier of Bangladeshi football.

== History ==
Founded in 1973 by employees of Sadharan Bima Corporation as a recreational program, the club entered the Dhaka First Division League in 1977 as champions of the previous year's Second Division. In their maiden top-flight season, Sadharan Bima finished 9th among 17 clubs. The club dropped out from the top-flight with the introduction of a Premier Division in 1993 and remained in the First Division until further relegation in 1996 to the Second Division. Nonetheless, the club returned to the First Division in 2000 before again suffering relegation in 2003. During the 2013–14 season, after a decade-long gap, the club returned to the top-flight of Dhaka, now known as the Senior Division League.

== Current squad ==
As of 25 July 2024

Note: Flags indicate national team as defined under FIFA eligibility rules; some limited exceptions apply. Players may hold more than one non-FIFA nationality.

No.	Pos.	Nation	Player
1	GK	BAN	Md Mustafizur Rahman
2	DF	BAN	Md Sabuj Rana
3	DF	BAN	Bejoy Krishna Das
4	DF	BAN	Saif Rahman Shail
5	FW	BAN	Md Rasel Munshi
6	FW	BAN	Md Uzzal Hossain
7	FW	BAN	Md Nazrul Islam
8	MF	BAN	Md Saikat Pramanik
9	FW	BAN	Nabil Ahmed
10	FW	BAN	Md Golam Sarwar (Captain)
11	MF	BAN	Md Al Amin
12	MF	BAN	BM Omar Faruk
13	DF	BAN	Md Rokibul Islam
14	MF	BAN	Md Sha Alam
15	FW	BAN	Md Rashedul Islam
16	DF	BAN	Mohammad Alamgir

No.	Pos.	Nation	Player
20	MF	BAN	Md Saiful Islam
21	FW	BAN	Md Shakwat Hoseen
22	GK	BAN	Md Munim Howlader
23	DF	BAN	Md Rashedul Islam
24	FW	BAN	Md Rafikul Islam
25	FW	BAN	Md Sarazul Islam
26	DF	BAN	Md Ahadul Islam
27	DF	BAN	Md Al Amin
28	DF	BAN	Md Imon
29	DF	BAN	Md Sohal Rana
30	FW	BAN	Md Zoynal Hossen
33	FW	BAN	Samir Kumar Maly
35	DF	BAN	Md Hasan Ali
36	FW	BAN	Wazi Bin Wahab Wasty
37	MF	BAN	Rony Kumar
99	GK	BAN	Sajibul Islam

== Personnel ==
=== Current coaching staff ===
As of 25 July 2024

Position	Name
Team Manager	(Bangladesh) Md Al Mamun
Team Leader	(Bangladesh) Md Sajib Ahmed
Assistant Manager	(Bangladesh) Md Abu Sufian
Head Coach	(Bangladesh) Md Masud Alamgir Jahangir
Assistant Coach	(Bangladesh) Md Arifur Rahman Pannu
Equipment Manager	(Bangladesh) Md Shahjahan
Security Officer	(Bangladesh) Jakir Hossain
Ball Boy	(Bangladesh) Imran Hossen Gazi

== Team records ==
=== Head coach record ===
As of 19 January 2026

Head Coach	From	To	P	W	D	L	GS	GA	%W
(Bangladesh) Md Masud Alam Jahangir	1 March 2024	25 August 2024	6	1	2	3	4	8	16.67
(Bangladesh) Monowar Hossain	15 November 2025	Present	16	11	3	2	29	15	68.75

== Honours ==
- Dhaka Second Division League
  - Champions (1): 1976
  - Runners-up (1): 1999

== Other departments ==
=== Field Hockey ===
The club's field hockey team currently participates in the Dhaka Premier Division Hockey League, the country's top-division field hockey league. They won the previous top division, the Dhaka First Division Hockey League, in both 1984 and 1985, while also achieving a runner-up finish in the Premier Division in 2014.

=== Cricket ===
The cricket team currently competes in the Dhaka Second Division Cricket League, having been relegated from the First Division in 2009.

== See also ==
- List of football clubs in Bangladesh
- History of football in Bangladesh
