= Bangladesh Boys Club =

Bangladesh Boys Club; বাংলাদেশ বয়েজ ক্লাব
- Full name: Bangladesh Boys Club
- Founded: 1954; 72 years ago
- Ground: Bangladesh Boys Club Ground, Gopibagh
- General Secretary: Mohammad Ramjan
- Head Coach: Md Harun
- League: Dhaka Senior Division League
- 2025–26: 11th of 17
Home colours	Away colours

Bangladesh Boys Club (Bengali: বাংলাদেশ বয়েজ ক্লাব) is a Bangladeshi football club based in the Gopibagh area of Dhaka. It currently competes in the Dhaka Senior Division League, the third tier of league football in Bangladesh.

== Current squad ==
As of 26 October 2025

Note: Flags indicate national team as defined under FIFA eligibility rules; some limited exceptions apply. Players may hold more than one non-FIFA nationality.

No.	Pos.	Nation	Player
1	GK	BAN	Md Borhan Uddin
2	DF	BAN	Mohammad Hossain
3	DF	BAN	Arshad Habib Bishal
4	DF	BAN	Diderul Alam
5	DF	BAN	Md Ashik Miah
6	MF	BAN	Md Swapon Miah
7	MF	BAN	Md Anisur Rahman Bishwas
8	MF	BAN	Shawaf Sarwar
9	FW	BAN	Muktar Lal Bishwas
10	FW	BAN	Md Shamim Mia (Captain)
11	FW	BAN	Mohammad Nawaz
12	FW	BAN	Md Alamgir Hosan
13	FW	BAN	Md Rakib Islam
14	DF	BAN	Tofazzal Hossain Mohan
15	FW	BAN	Amit Hasan
16	DF	BAN	Mohammad Sadek Hossain Khoka
17	MF	BAN	Tuhin Ahamed Sohan

No.	Pos.	Nation	Player
18	DF	BAN	Md Riaz
19	MF	BAN	Abdullah Al Mamun
20	FW	BAN	Md Rana Ahmed
23	DF	BAN	Md Yasin Talukdar
24	MF	BAN	Md Borhan Uddin
25	GK	BAN	Saykat Hossain
26	FW	BAN	Md Riaz Hossain
27	DF	BAN	Md Ariful Islam
28	DF	BAN	Robiul Islam
29	MF	BAN	Abdur Rahman
30	GK	BAN	Mohammad Esfakur Rahman Tamim
31	FW	BAN	Osman Bin Laden
32	FW	BAN	Ayon Kormokar
33	FW	BAN	Mohammad Rashed
34	FW	BAN	Mohammad Joyayad Hossain
35	FW	BAN	Farhad Hossain
36	MF	BAN	Shamim Ahmed

== Personnel ==
=== Current coaching staff ===
As of 25 July 2024

Position	Name
Team Manager	(Bangladesh) Md Harunur Rashid
Team Leader	(Bangladesh) Hazi Md Ramjan
Assistant Manager	(Bangladesh) Md Ramjan Hossain
Head Coach	(Bangladesh) Md Harun
Assistant Coach	(Bangladesh) Abdur Rob Jamil
Fitness Trainer	(Bangladesh) Lokman Khandokar
Security Officer	(Bangladesh) Ahsanul Islam Ripon
Ball Boy	(Bangladesh) Md Rubel Bepary

== Team records ==
=== Head coach record ===
As of 21 January 2026

Head Coach	From	To	P	W	D	L	GS	GA	%W
(Bangladesh) Md Harun	1 April 2024	Present	22	6	6	10	11	17	27.27

== Honours ==
- Dhaka First Division League
  - Runners-up (1): 1993
- Dhaka Second Division League
  - Champions (1): 1991–92
- Dhaka Third Division League
  - Champions (1): 1987
