= Basabo Tarun Sangha =

Bangladeshi Association football club

- Full name: Basabo Tarun Sangha
- Nickname: Tarun Sangha Club
- Founded: 1956; 70 years ago
- Ground: BSSS Mostafa Kamal Stadium
- Capacity: 25,000
- Acting Member Secretary: Safiqur Rahman Khokon
- Head Coach: Mohammad Ullah Dalim
- League: Dhaka Senior Division League
- 2025–26: 7th of 17
Home colours	Away colours

Basabo Tarun Sangha (Bengali: বাসাবো তরুণ সংঘ) is a Bangladeshi football club based in Basabo, Dhaka. It currently competes in the Dhaka Senior Division League, the third-tier of Bangladeshi football.

== History ==
The club was founded in 1956 in Basabo, Dhaka.

During the 1989–90 season, the club earned promotion to the Dhaka Third Division League after finishing runners-up to Gendaria Famous in the Pioneer League. In the 1993 edition of the Third Division League, the club became champions and were further promoted to the Second Division. The club spent almost two decades as a Second Division outfit before winning the league title in 2012, which resulted in their promotion to the Dhaka Senior Division League, Dhaka's top tier and the country's third tier.

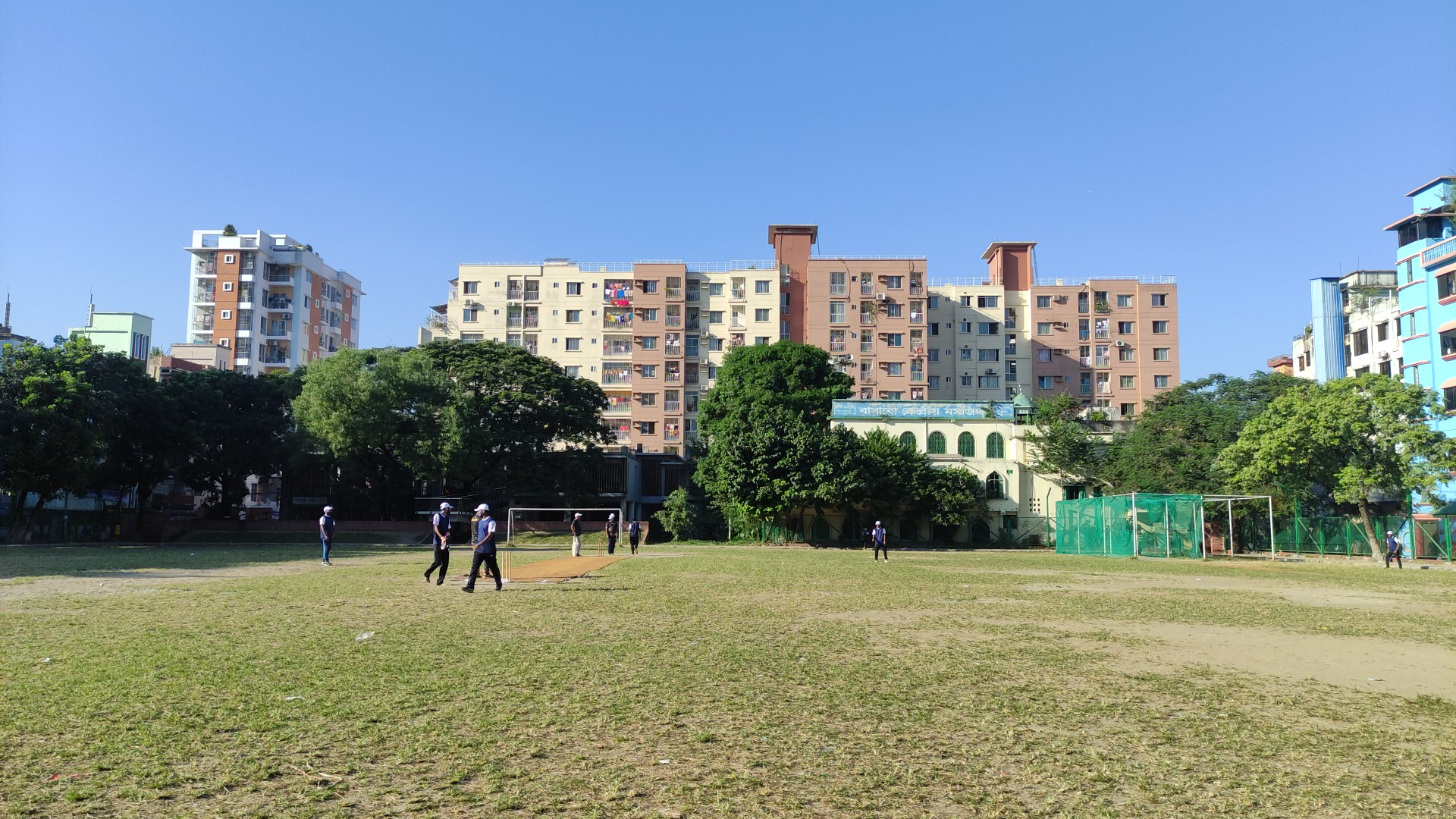
Basabo Playground

== Ground ==
The Bir Muktijoddha Shaheed Alauddin Playground, previously just known as Basabo Playground, reopened to the public in 2019 following renovations. It serves as the main recreational facility for residents, featuring a children's play area and a food court. Additionally, it houses the Basabo Youth Association building, which includes a library, gymnasium, and indoor sports rooms. It is maintained by the club and used as their training ground.

== Current squad ==
As of 29 October 2025

Note: Flags indicate national team as defined under FIFA eligibility rules; some limited exceptions apply. Players may hold more than one non-FIFA nationality.

No.	Pos.	Nation	Player
1	GK	BAN	Md Sakur Rahman
2	DF	BAN	Manik Mia
3	DF	BAN	Shoriful Islam
4	DF	BAN	Rifat Hossain
5	DF	BAN	Imran Nazir
6	MF	BAN	Reduanul Haque
7	MF	BAN	Md Julfiqar Ali
8	MF	BAN	Md Shamim Shahed
9	FW	BAN	Md Minhaz Hossain (Captain)
10	FW	BAN	Ranga Malo
11	MF	BAN	Ratan Ghosh
12	MF	BAN	Md Rajib
13	FW	BAN	Arman Khan
14	DF	BAN	Md Sojol
15	DF	BAN	Md Abdur Razzak
16	MF	BAN	Md Shein Shaikh
17	MF	BAN	Emon Barua
18	DF	BAN	Md Robiul Islam

No.	Pos.	Nation	Player
19	MF	BAN	Md Monjurul Akash
20	FW	BAN	Md Bayzed Bostame
21	DF	BAN	Md Sohel Rana
22	GK	BAN	Mostafa Khan
23	FW	BAN	Manuel Soren
24	MF	BAN	Md Saiful
25	GK	BAN	Md Mehedi Hasan
26	FW	BAN	Md Saeed Hossain
27	MF	BAN	Md Rashedul Islam
28	DF	BAN	Md Mirajul Pramonil
29	DF	BAN	Md Arif Hossain
30	GK	BAN	Shapinur Islam Shahinur
31	MF	BAN	Md Sumon Ali Khan
32	MF	BAN	Md Yunus Ali
33	MF	BAN	Amir Hamza
34	MF	BAN	Md Jobawel Hossain
35	MF	BAN	Mohammad Fahad

== Personnel ==
=== Current coaching staff ===
As of 29 July 2024

Position	Name
Team Manager	(Bangladesh) Md Sujauddin Ahmed
Team Leader	(Bangladesh) Md Abu Saeed Babu
Assistant Manager	(Bangladesh) Taslim Uddin Mia
Head Coach	(Bangladesh) Abu Ahmed Faysal
Goalkeeping Coach	(Bangladesh) Md Rafiqul Islam
Equipment Manager	(Bangladesh) Md Niaz
Security Officer	(Bangladesh) Mohammad Ali
Ball Boy	(Bangladesh) Md Mehedi Hasan

== Team records ==
=== Managerial statistics ===
As of 21 January 2026

Head Coach	From	To	P	W	D	L	GS	GA	%W
(Bangladesh) Abu Ahmed Faysal	1 June 2024	20 August 2025	6	1	2	3	3	6	16.67
(Bangladesh) Mohammad Ullah Dalim	10 July 2025	Present	16	5	5	6	19	22	31.25

== Honours ==
- Dhaka Second Division League
  - Champions (1): 2012
- Dhaka Third Division League
  - Champions (1): 1993
- Pioneer League
  - Runners-up (1): 1989–90

== See also ==
- List of football clubs in Bangladesh
- History of football in Bangladesh
