= Badda Jagoroni Sangsad =

Bangladeshi association football club

- Full name: Badda Jagoroni Sangsad
- Nickname: Jagoroni Sangsad
- Founded: 1980
- Ground: BSSS Mostafa Kamal Stadium
- Capacity: 25,000
- General Secretary: Abul Hassan Chowdhury Prince
- Head Coach: Saiful Islam
- League: Dhaka Senior Division League
- 2025–26: Dhaka Senior Division League, 9th of 17
- Website: Badda Jagoroni Sangsad
Home colours	Away colours

Badda Jagoroni Sangsad (Bengali: বাড্ডা জগরনী সংসদ) is a Bangladeshi football club based in Badda, Dhaka. formerly known as Badda Naveen Krira Chakra. It currently competes in the Dhaka Senior Division League, the third-tier of Bangladeshi football.

== History ==
=== Early years ===
The club was founded in Badda, Dhaka as Badda Naveen Krira Chakra. In 1980, they participated in the inaugural edition of the Pioneer League; however, the league ended without declaring a champion and runner-up team. In 1986, the club was crowned champion of the Pioneer League, edging out runners-up Matuail Jubo Sangha, as both teams were promoted to the Dhaka Third Division League.

In their fourth season competing in the Third Division, in 1991–92, Badda earned promotion to the Second Division as runners-up to Lalmatia Club after securing a 0–0 draw with the eventual champions on the league's final matchday. In the 1994–95 season of the Second Division, the club secured promotion to the country's second tier, the Dhaka First Division League, as runners-up to Police AC.

Badda finished fifth and third in their first two seasons in the First Division, missing out on promotion by two points during the latter. The club eventually secured promotion to the top tier, the Dhaka Premier Division League, after securing the 1997–98 First Division title. They were the league's highest goal scorers that season, scoring 48 goals and conceding 24. All five of the club's promotion campaigns, starting from 1986, were spearheaded by coach Sayeed Hassan Kanan, who was also actively playing in the top tier until 1996.

=== Relative success ===
In January 1999, the club participated in the West Bengal Independence Day Cup held in South Dinajpur, Calcutta, India. In preparation for tournament, the club acquired the loan signings of Bangladesh national team players, Aminul Haque, Mohammed Jewel Rana, Hassan Al-Mamun and Imtiaz Ahmed Nakib. The club secured a place in the tournament final after dismantling Nepal XI 5–0. In the final held on 17 January 1999, Badda defeated Calcutta's Aryan FC by a single goal scored by guest striker, Imtiaz Ahmed Nakib.

The club began their domestic campaign by participating in the Federation Cup, where they managed to reach the semi-finals. In the first leg of their semi-final tie against Dhaka Abahani, a 57th-minute goal from Harun helped Badda secure a historic win, nonetheless, Abahani clinched the tie after defeating Badda 0–3 in the second-leg. The club's winger, Monwar Hossain, finished tournament top-scorer with 6 goals.

In the league, the club finished fifth, missing out on a championship playoff spot by a single point. Following the conclusion of their maiden top-tier campaign, the club again travelled to West Bengal in November 1999, this to participate in the prestigious IFA Shield. They reached the tournament semi-final, where they were defeated 0–1 by Mohun Bagan. A few notable players from that season were Monwar Hossain, Tanvir Chowdhury and Saiful Islam Khokon, to name a few.

=== Yo-yo years ===
Despite their promising debut season in the Premier Division, the club was relegated the following year, in 2000, despite retaining the majority of their players from the previous season. Nonetheless, under coach Sayeed Hassan Kanan, the club returned to the Premier Division within a year after finishing runners-up in the 2001 season. The club's wingers, Mehedi Hasan Ujjal and Bhaktiar Uddin, scored 9 goals each, as the club finished with 31 points, one short of champions Victoria SC.

In their first year back in the Premier Division in 2002, the club finished sixth, following this, Kanan stepped away from his head coach duties and became a member of the club's ad hoc committee. In the following year, they were once again relegated after finishing second from the bottom. In 2003, the club won the Shaheed Zia Juba Gold Cup Football Tournament, defeating Bangladesh national under-20 team in the final.

In the following season, in 2005, under the coaching of Mahabub Hossain Roksy, Badda once again finished runners-up in the First Division to secure their return to the top-tier. However, the Premier Division would not be held for the next two years, and although the club were bound to participate in the first edition of the Bangladesh Premier League, their participation was not finalised and eventually, club began participating in the second-tier, the Dhaka Senior Division Football League, a merger of the Premier and First Division. Prior to that, in 2005, Badda participated in the Kalinga Cup held in Odisha, India, where they reached the semi-finals, only to be defeated by Calcutta's Eveready Association 2–4 on penalties.

Badda became champions of the Senior Division in the 2012–13 season, and the following year would participate in the country's first professional second-tier league, the Bangladesh Championship League. They were relegated back to the Senior Division after just one season, after finishing bottom of the 2014 Bangladesh Championship League, failing to win a single game as they finished bottom of the league. Following their return to the Senior Division, Sayeed Hassan Kanan returned as the club's head coach in 2017. In the same year, Badda who were destined for another relegation, avoided the drop after both Dhaka United SC and Friends Social Organisation were handed suspensions by the Bangladesh Football Federation as they were involved with match fixing.

== Current squad ==
As of 15 November 2025

Note: Flags indicate national team as defined under FIFA eligibility rules; some limited exceptions apply. Players may hold more than one non-FIFA nationality.

No.	Pos.	Nation	Player
1	GK	BAN	Md Shamsuddin
2	DF	BAN	Md Habibur Rahman
3	DF	BAN	Absuhan Fariz Abir
4	DF	BAN	Minhaz Uddin
5	DF	BAN	Ripon Mia
6	MF	BAN	Md Al Amin
7	MF	BAN	Mehebub Hasan Nayan
8	MF	BAN	Md Hridoy Howladar
9	FW	BAN	Abdullah Al Kasem
10	MF	BAN	Md Shamim Mia
11	FW	BAN	Shujon Mahato
12	DF	BAN	Md Limon Mia (Captain)
13	DF	BAN	Bijoy Chandra Das
14	FW	BAN	Ajijur Rahman
15	FW	BAN	Md Shamal Hossain

No.	Pos.	Nation	Player
16	FW	BAN	Md Pranto
17	MF	BAN	Md Amir Hamza Bidduth
18	MF	BAN	Md Masud
19	FW	BAN	Md Abu Jahed
20	FW	BAN	Md Mahmudul Hasan
21	GK	BAN	Md Sagor Mondal
22	GK	BAN	Iftar Bin Md Farhad
23	DF	BAN	Md Rasel Mia
24	FW	BAN	Shakib Al Hasan
25	DF	BAN	Md Shawwun Hossain
26	DF	BAN	Md Abir Hasan
28	DF	BAN	Md Ratul Sheikh
29	DF	BAN	Sakibul Hasan Sakib
30	GK	BAN	Md Uzzal

== Personnel ==
=== Current technical staff ===
As of 15 November 2025

Position	Name
Head coach	(Bangladesh) Md Saiful Islam
Team Manager	(Bangladesh) Mohammad Yasin
Team Leader	(Bangladesh) AGM Shamsul Haque
Assistant Coach	(Bangladesh) Sadhon Kumar Dey
Assistant Manager	(Bangladesh) Abu Faysal
Goalkeeping Coach	(Bangladesh) Shultan Ahammed
Media Officer	(Bangladesh) Md Habibur Rahman
Physiotherapist	(Bangladesh) Mamunur Rahoman
Equipment Manager	(Bangladesh) Md Hasan
Media Officer	(Bangladesh) Mahbub Alam Bhuiyan

== Team records ==
=== Head coaches record ===
As of 15 January 2026

Head Coach	From	To	P	W	D	L	GS	GA	%W
(Bangladesh) Sayeed Hassan Kanan	1 April 2024	30 August 2024	6	1	4	1	4	2	16.67
(Bangladesh) Saiful Islam	15 November 2025	Present	16	4	6	6	23	23	25.00

== Honours ==
=== League ===
- Dhaka Senior Division League
  - Champions (1): 2012
- Dhaka First Division League
  - Champions (1): 1997–98
  - Runners-up (2): 2001, 2005
- Dhaka Second Division League
  - Runners-up (1): 1994
- Dhaka Third Division League
  - Runners-up (1): 1991–92
- Pioneer League
  - Champions (1): 1986

=== Cup ===
- Shaheed Zia Juba Gold Cup Football Tournament
  - Winners (1): 2003
- West Bengal Independence Day Cup
  - Winners (1): 1999

== See also ==
- List of football clubs in Bangladesh
- History of football in Bangladesh
