= Dhaka Football League =

Association football league in Bangladesh

- Organising body: Dhaka Sports Association (c. 1911–1950); East Pakistan Sports Association (1951); East Pakistan Sports Federation (1951–1971); Bangladesh Football Federation (1972–present)
- Founded: c. 1911; 1948 (recognized)
- Country: Bangladesh
- Confederation: AFC
- Divisions: Senior Division League; Second Division League; Third Division League
- Number of clubs: 46
- Level on pyramid: 1–2 (1948–1950); 1–3 (1951–1965); 1–4 (1966–1969); 1–3 (1970–1992); 1–4 (1993–2006); 3–5 (2007–present)
- Promotion to: Bangladesh Championship League
- Relegation to: Pioneer Football League
- Current champions: 1st Div: Samaj Kalyan K. S. (1st title); 2nd Div: Jatrabari JS (1st title); 3rd Div: Chawkbazar Kings (1st title)
- Most championships: 1st Div: Mohammedan SC (19 titles); 2nd Div: 3 teams (3 titles); 3rd Div: Dilkusha SC (3 titles)
- Current: 2025–26 Dhaka Senior Division League; 2025–26 Dhaka Second Division League; 2025–26 Dhaka Third Division League

Dhaka Football League (Bengali: ঢাকা ফুটবল লিগ) is Bangladesh's semi-professional football league based in Dhaka. It includes the third-tier, Senior Division, the fourth-tier, Second Division and the fifth-tier, Third Division.

The league is run by Dhaka Metropolitan Football League Committee (DMFLC) under the supervision of Bangladesh Football Federation (BFF). Prior to the introduction of the professional national league in 2007, the district league consisted of the country's top-three tiers, and until 1999, the winners of the top-tier were given entry to the Asian Club Championship (now AFC Champions League Elite). The top-two finishing clubs of the Senior Division are promoted to the professional league through the second-tier, the Bangladesh Championship League, while the bottom two teams of the Third Division are relegated to the amateur sixth-tier, the Pioneer Football League.

== History ==
=== Origins (1911–1946) ===
The Dhaka Sports Association (DSA) was established in 1895 in Paltan, Dhaka as the apex body overseeing sports in Dhaka, and also played an important role in the spread of association football in the eastern part of Bengal Presidency, British India. The DSA had been organising the Dhaka First Division Football League|Dhaka First Division League since at least 1911. According to the DSA's 42nd Annual Report for 1937–38, the First Division, Second Division, and Third Division competitions were all held in Dhaka. At that time, the First Division featured 10 teams, the Second Division had 9 teams, and the Third Division comprised 6 teams. Several well-known teams of the era came from various sections of the Dhaka University, including Muslim Hall, Medical College, and Dhaka Hall, among others. Prominent sports clubs such as Dhaka Farm, Wari Club and Victoria SC also fielded strong and competitive teams. Notably, Dacca Farm won the First Division in both in 1936 and 1937. The league's administration was heavily influenced by the Nawab family of Dhaka, with games usually being held in the Dhaka Sports Association field now occupied by the Dhaka Stadium.

=== Pre-partition (1947–1971) ===
Following the partition of India and the formation of Pakistan in 1947, the First and Second Divisions resumed in 1948, under the supervision of the Dhaka Sports Association (DSA). In 1951, DSA was renamed East Pakistan Sports Association (EPSA) and on 15 May 1951, the EPSA, the eastern province's main sports body, inaugurated the Second and Third Divisions, with the latter resuming for the first time after partition. On 20 May 1951, the East Pakistan Sports Federation (EPSF), merged with the EPSA and began acting as the province's main sports body under the presidency of Habibullah Bahar Chowdhury. The EPSF took over operations of the Second and Third Divisions, and started the First Division on 25 May 1951. While other district leagues operated under their respective sports associations, the Dhaka Football League, being the eastern province's highest level of football, was operated by the EPSF from 1951 to 1970. The First Division games were mainly held in the Dhaka Stadium in Motijheel, following its construction in 1954, while games from the two lower-tiers were hosted by the Outer Stadium Ground. Additionally, the practice grounds of Victoria SC, Wari Club and Mohammedan SC also hosted league games. In 1955, the First Division was abandoned due to severe regional flooding, despite more than half of its matches having been completed. Dhaka Wanderers Club are historically credited as the league champions for that year. Notably, both the Second Division and Third Division seasons were completed despite the floods. In 1965, a Fourth Division was introduced by the EPSF, expanding the football league to four tiers. The league lasted for three seasons, and following the independence of Bangladesh in 1971, the league system reverted to three tiers.

=== Pre-independence (1971–present) ===
After the Bangladesh Liberation War and the country's subsequent independence, the Bangladesh Football Federation (BFF) was established on 15 July 1972. Under the supervision of the BFF, the Dhaka Metropolitan Football League Committee (DMFLC) began operating the Dhaka Football League. Although the First, Second, and Third Divisions resumed in 1972, they were abandoned after only a few matches due to economic and political challenges. However, in 1973, all three tiers resumed, with BIDC, BRTC SC, and Brothers Union winning the First Division, Second Division, and Third Division, respectively. Notably, Brothers Union entered the First Division in 1975 after going unbeaten in their Third and Second Division title triumphs in 1973 and 1974, respectively.

In 1981, the Pioneer League was introduced by the BFF as a fourth-tier, age-level competition. The winners of this league were promoted to the Third Division and, in turn, to the Dhaka Football League. The First Division club's also became eligible to participate in continental competitions, and from 1984, the winners of the First Division were given entry to the Asian Club Championship (now AFC Champions League Elite). Dhaka Abahani became the first Bangladeshi club to participate in the competition in the 1985–86 edition, following their 1984 First Division League triumph. The 1984 season was a significant year in Dhaka football, as the DMFLC for the first time introduced the 3 point system in the First Division.

In 1993, the BFF restructured the country's league system by introducing the Dhaka Premier Division Football League, with the First Division becoming the second-tier, expanding Bangladesh's league system to five-tiers. The inaugural Senior Division featured the top ten teams from the 1992 Dhaka First Division League, while the bottom ten teams remained in the First Division, alongside the champions and runners-up of the 1992 Dhaka Second Division League. The reconstruction meant that the Premier Division and the First Division made up the Senior Division of the football league system, while the Second and Third Divisions made up the Junior Division.

In 2000, the National Football League was established, featuring the champion from each Dhaka Premier League season. In addition, district league champions were required to compete in a qualifying tournament for their respective divisions. The creation of the National League aimed to expand the domestic football landscape and encourage the participation of clubs beyond the capital. As a result, clubs from the Premier League lost their eligibility to compete in the Asian Club Championship, which was reintroduced after the 2001–02 edition. Following the launch of the AFC Cup in 2004, the AFC competition spot that was previously granted to the Dhaka Premier League champions was reassigned to the winners of both the National League and the Federation Cup, in line with the updated tournament rules.

==== Professional league introduction (2007–present) ====
In 2007, the BFF launched the B.League, which became the country's first-ever professional football league, later renamed the Bangladesh Football League. The professional league allowed clubs from outside Dhaka to participate, aiming to decentralize domestic football. As a result, the Dhaka Premier Division League was merged with the Dhaka First Division League and rebranded as the Dhaka Senior Division Football League, becoming the second-tier competition. In 2012, the introduction of the Bangladesh Championship League, a second-tier professional football league also open to clubs outside Dhaka, led to the reclassification of the Senior Division as the third-tier league. Meaning the Dhaka Football League now made up the third, fourth and fifth-tiers of the Bangladeshi football league system.

On 16 September 2021, the BFF decided to dissolve the Third Division from the 2021–2022 season and merge it with the upper-tier. The decision received much scrutiny from the clubs participating in the Dhaka Football League. On 3 January 2023, BFF reversed their decision and also announced that the Third Division clubs will only be allowed to field U17 players from the 2022–23 season.

Additionally, the Pioneer League, serving as the country's fourth tier, was decentralized by the BFF, meaning clubs promoted from the competition to the Dhaka Football League could also be from outside the capital. Notably, in the 2022–23 season, the Third Division consisted of eight teams located outside of Dhaka, while the Second Division had four non-Dhaka district based clubs. Eventually, the 2025–26 Dhaka Senior Division Football League included NoFeL SC from Noakhali. Although all Dhaka Football League games were held in the capital, the increasing participation of clubs from outside the capital contributed to the decentralization of the league.

== Structure ==
Level	League / Division
3	Dhaka Senior Division Football League; 17 clubs – 2 promotion, 2 relegation
4	Dhaka Second Division Football League; 15 clubs – 2 promotion, 2 relegation
5	Dhaka Third Division Football League; 15 clubs – 2 promotion, 2 relegation

=== Timeline ===
Season	Level	League
1948–1950	1–2	Dhaka First Division League; Dhaka Second Division League
1951–1965	1–3	Dhaka First Division League; Dhaka Second Division League; Dhaka Third Division League
1966–1969	1–4	Dhaka First Division League; Dhaka Second Division League; Dhaka Third Division League; Dhaka Fourth Division League
1970–1980	1–3	Dhaka First Division League; Dhaka Second Division League; Dhaka Third Division League
1993–2006	1–4	Dhaka Premier Division League; Dhaka First Division League; Dhaka Second Division League; Dhaka Third Division League
2007–2011	2–4	Dhaka Senior Division League; Dhaka Second Division League; Dhaka Third Division League
2012–present	3–5	Dhaka Senior Division League; Dhaka Second Division League; Dhaka Third Division League

== Clubs ==
=== Current clubs ===
==== Senior Division ====
2025–26 season
Team	Location
Arambagh FA	(Motijheel), Dhaka
Badda Jagoroni Sangsad	(Badda), Dhaka
Bangladesh Boys Club	(Gopibag), Dhaka
Basabo Tarun Sangha	(Basabo), Dhaka
Dhaka United	Dhaka
East End Club	(Gendaria), Dhaka
Friends Social Welfare Organization	Dhaka
Jatrabari KC	(Jatrabari), Dhaka
Kashaituly SKP	Dhaka
Mohakhali Ekadosh	(Mohakhali), Dhaka
Nobabpur KC	(Nawabpur), Dhaka
NoFeL SC	Noakhali
Somaj Kallyan KS Mugda	(Mugda), Dhaka
Sadharan Bima	Dhaka
Siddique Bazar JSC	Dhaka
Swadhinata KS	Dhaka
T&T Club	(Motijheel), Dhaka

==== Second Division ====
2022–23 season
Team	Location
Bangladesh Press Sports & Recreation Club	Dhaka
Bangladesh Krira Shikkha Protishtan	(Savar), Dhaka
Bikrampur Kings	(Bikrampur), Munshiganj
Dilkusha Sporting Club	(Dilkusha), Dhaka
Gouripur Sporting Club	(Daudkandi), Comilla
Jabid Ahsan Sohel Krira Chakra	Dhaka
Jatrabari Jhatika Sangsad	Jatrabari, Dhaka
Kadamtola Sangsad	Dhaka
Kallol Sangha	Chittagong
Kingstar Sporting Club	Dhaka
Purbachal Parishad	Dhaka
Tongi Krira Chakra	(Tongi), Gazipur
Victoria Sporting Club	(Motijheel), Dhaka

==== Third Division ====
2022–23 season
Team	Location
Asaduzzaman Football Academy	Magura
Chawkbazar Kings	(Chowk Bazaar), Dhaka
Dipali Jubo Sangha	Dhaka
Elias Ahmed Chowdhury Smrity Sangha	Madaripur
FC Brahmanbaria	Brahmanbaria
FC Uttar Bongo	Kurigram
Green Welfare Center Munshigonj	Munshiganj
Lalbagh Sporting Club	(Lalbagh), Dhaka
Rainbow Athletic Club	Narayanganj
Shantinagar Club	(Shantinagar), Dhaka
Skylark Football Club	(Paltan), Dhaka
The Muslims Institute	Dhaka
Tangail Football Academy	Tangail
Uttara Friends Club	(Uttara), Dhaka
Wazed Miah Krira Chakra	Rangpur
Elias Ahmed Chowdhury Smrity Sangha	Madaripur

=== Clubs outside Dhaka ===
Team	Location	League
NoFeL SC	Noakhali	Senior Division
Bikrampur Kings	(Bikrampur), Munshiganj	Second Division
Gouripur Sporting Club	(Daudkandi), Comilla	Second Division
Kallol Sangha	Chittagong	Second Division
Tongi Krira Chakra	(Tongi), Gazipur	Second Division
Asaduzzaman Football Academy	Magura	Third Division
FC Brahmanbaria	Brahmanbaria	Third Division
FC Uttar Bongo	Kurigram	Third Division
Green Welfare Center Munshigonj	Munshiganj	Third Division
Rainbow Athletic Club	Narayanganj	Third Division
Tangail Football Academy	Tangail	Third Division
Wazed Miah Krira Chakra	Rangpur	Third Division
Elias Ahmed Chowdhury Smrity Sangha	Madaripur	Third Division

== Champions ==
Champions after partition of India (1948–present)
Season	First Division	Second Division	None	None
1948	Victoria SC	EP Gymkhana	No held	No fourth-tier
1949	EP Gymkhana	Tejgaon FU	No held	No fourth-tier
1950	Dhaka Wanderers	Fire Service AC	No held	No fourth-tier
Season	First Division	Second Division	Third Division	None
1951	Dhaka Wanderers	Bengal Government Press	Unknown	No fourth-tier
1952	Bengal Government Press	EP Rifles	Holden XI	No fourth-tier
1953	Dhaka Wanderers	East End Club	Unknown	No fourth-tier
1954	Dhaka Wanderers	Signal Wings	Unknown	No fourth-tier
1955	Dhaka Wanderers	Central Printing Press	Unknown	No fourth-tier
1956	Dhaka Wanderers	Dhakeswari Cotton Mills	PWD SC	No fourth-tier
1957	Mohammedan SC	PWD SC	Unknown	No fourth-tier
1958	Azad SC	East Bengal Railway	Unknown	No fourth-tier
1959	Mohammedan SC	Kamal SC	Unknown	No fourth-tier
1960	Dhaka Wanderers	Adamjee S.A.	Unknown	No fourth-tier
1961	Mohammedan SC	Pakistan Eastern Railway	Fakirerpool YMC	No fourth-tier
1962	Victoria SC	DC Jail	Shahjahanpur SC	No fourth-tier
1963	Mohammedan SC	Fire Service AC	Rahmatganj MFS	No fourth-tier
1964	Victoria SC	Rahmatganj MFS	EPIDC	No fourth-tier
1965	Mohammedan SC	EPIDC	Dilkusha SC	No fourth-tier
Season	First Division	Second Division	Third Division	Fourth Division
1966	Mohammedan SC	Railway Pioneers	Bachelors' Club	EPWAPDA SC Purbachal Parishad
1967	EPIDC	East End Club	EPWAPDA SC	EPRTC SC
1968	EPIDC	Dilkusha SC	Dhanmondi Club Farashganj SC	Nont held
1969	Mohammedan SC	EPWAPDA SC	EPRTC SC	IWTA RC
Season	First Division	Second Division	Third Division	None
1970	EPIDC	Iqbal SC	Arambagh KS Dhaka SC	No fourth-tier
1971	Not held due to the Bangladesh Liberation War			
1972	Not completed			No fourth-tier
1973	EPIDC	BRTC SC	Brothers Union	No fourth-tier
1974	Dhaka Abahani	Brothers Union	Shantinagar Club	No fourth-tier
1975	Mohammedan SC	Shantinagar Club	Agrani Bank	No fourth-tier
1976	Mohammedan SC	Sadharan Bima	Shahjahanpur SC	No fourth-tier
1977	Dhaka Abahani	Fire Service AC	Bangladesh Rifles	No fourth-tier
1978	Mohammedan SC	Dhanmondi Club	Not held	No fourth-tier
1979	Team BJMC	Arambagh KS	The Muslim Institute	No fourth-tier
1980	Mohammedan SC	Farashganj SC	Rayer Bazar AC	No fourth-tier
1981	Dhaka Abahani	Not held	Lalbagh SC	No fourth-tier
1982	Mohammedan SC	BRTC SC	Not held	No fourth-tier
1983	Dhaka Abahani	Muktijoddha Sangsad	Mirpur Chalantika	No fourth-tier
1984	Dhaka Abahani	PWD SC	Adamjee SCC	No fourth-tier
1985	Dhaka Abahani	Mirpur Chalantika	Avijatrik Malibagh	No fourth-tier
1986	Mohammedan SC	Adamjee SCC	East Bengal Limited	No fourth-tier
1987	Mohammedan SC	Fakirerpool YMC	Bangladesh Boys	No fourth-tier
1988–89	Mohammedan SC	Team BJMC	Eskaton SSC	No fourth-tier
1989–90	Dhaka Abahani	Eskaton SSC	Mohakhali Ekadosh	No fourth-tier
1991	Not held		Lalmatia Club	No fourth-tier
1992	Dhaka Abahani	Bangladesh Boys	Not held	No fourth-tier
Season	Premier Division	First Division	Second Division	Third Division
1993	Mohammedan SC	Fakirerpool YMC	Shantinagar Club	Basabo TS
1994	Dhaka Abahani	Rahmatganj MFS	Police AC	Gendaria Famous Club
1995	Dhaka Abahani	East End Club	Mirpur Chalantika	Prantik KC
1996	Mohammedan SC	Victoria SC	Shantinagar Club	T&T Club
1997–98	Muktijoddha Sangsad	Badda JS	Prantik KC	Kashaituly SKP
1998	Not held			
1999	Mohammedan SC	Victoria SC	PWD SC	Not held
2000	Muktijoddha Sangsad	Agrani Bank	Not held	City Club
2001	Dhaka Abahani	Victoria SC	Sheikh Russel KC	Kadamtola Sangsad
2002	Mohammedan SC	Dhaka Wanderers	Mohakhali Ekadosh	Little Friends
2003–04	Brothers Union	Fakirerpool YMC	Purbachal Parishad	Uttar Baridhara
2004–05	Brothers Union	Rahmatganj MFS	Jatrabari KC	Not held
2005–06	Not held			
2006–07	Not held		Euro Famous Club	
Season	Senior Division	Second Division	Third Division	None
2007–08	Fakirerpool YMC	Uttar Baridhara	Not held	No fourth-tier
2008	Not held			No fourth-tier
2009	Not held		PWD SC	No fourth-tier
2010	Fakirerpool YMC	Not held		No fourth-tier
2011	Not held		Dilkusha SC	No fourth-tier
2012	Badda JS	Basabo TS	Not held	No fourth-tier
2013	Not held	Police AC	Nobabpur KC	No fourth-tier
2014	Fakirerpool YMC	Not held		No fourth-tier
2015	Not held		Dilkusha SC	No fourth-tier
2016	Not held			No fourth-tier
2017	Swadhinata KS	Nobabpur KC	Not held	No fourth-tier
2018–19	Kawran Bazar PS	Arambagh FA	Not held	No fourth-tier
2019–20	Not held		Alamgir SKKS	No fourth-tier
2020–21	Not held			No fourth-tier
2021–22	Somaj Kallyan	Saif SC Youth	Not held	No fourth-tier
2022–23	Not held	Jatrabari JS	Chawkbazar Kings	No fourth-tier
2023–24	Not completed	Not held		No fourth-tier
2024–25	Not held			No fourth-tier

== See also ==
- Football in Bangladesh
- Bangladesh Football League
- Bangladesh Championship League
