= 2022–23 in Bangladeshi football =

Bangladeshi football season

Football in Bangladesh
- Season: 2022–23

Men's football
- BPL: Bashundhara Kings
- BCL: Brothers Union
- 1st Division: Not Held
- 2nd Division: Jatrabari JS
- 3rd Division: Chawkbazar Kings
- Federation Cup: Mohammedan SC
- Independence Cup: Bashundhara Kings
- Super Cup: Not Held

Women's football
- BWFL: Not Held

The following article presents a summary of the 2022–23 football (soccer) season in Bangladesh, which is the 51st season of competitive football in the country.

== Bangladesh National Football Team ==
=== AFC Asian Cup Qualification- third round ===
Group E

Pos	Team	Pld	W	D	L	GF	GA	GD	Pts	Qualification	Bahrain	Malaysia	Turkmenistan	Bangladesh
1	Bahrain	3	3	0	0	5	1	+4	9	2023 AFC Asian Cup	—	—	1–0	2–0
2	Malaysia (H)	3	2	0	1	8	4	+4	6	2023 AFC Asian Cup	1–2	—	—	4–1
3	Turkmenistan	3	1	0	2	3	5	−2	3		—	1–3	—	—
4	Bangladesh	3	0	0	3	2	8	−6	0		—	—	1–2	—

Source: AFC
(H) Hosts

8 June 2022 2023 Asian Cup qualification	Bahrain	2–0	Bangladesh	Kuala Lumpur, Malaysia
17:15 UTC+8	Haram 34'; Al-Aswad 42'	Report		Stadium: Bukit Jalil National Stadium; Attendance: 826; Referee: Tejas Nagvenkar (India)

11 June 2022 2023 Asian Cup qualification	Bangladesh	1–2	Turkmenistan	Kuala Lumpur, Malaysia
17:15 UTC+8	Ibrahim 12'	Report	Annadurdyýew 7'; Amanow 77'	Stadium: Bukit Jalil National Stadium; Attendance: 5,598; Referee: Clifford Daypuyat (Philippines)

14 June 2022 2023 Asian Cup qualification	Malaysia	4–1	Bangladesh	Kuala Lumpur, Malaysia
21:00 UTC+8	Safawi 16' (pen.); Cools 38'; Syafiq 47'; Lok 73'	Report	Ibrahim 31'	Stadium: Bukit Jalil National Stadium; Attendance: 52,964; Referee: Zaid Thamer Mohammed (Iraq)

=== Friendlies ===
22 September 2022 Friendly	Cambodia	0–1	Bangladesh	Phnom Penh, Cambodia
19:00 UTC+7		Report	Rakib 23'	Stadium: Morodok Techo National Stadium; Attendance: 11,993; Referee: Suhaizi Shukri (Malaysia)

27 September 2022 Friendly	Nepal	3–1	Bangladesh	Kathmandu, Nepal
17:30 UTC+5:45	Bista 18', 27', 38'	Report	Hossain 56'	Stadium: Dasarath Rangasala Stadium; Attendance: 8,665; Referee: Virendha Rai (Bhutan)

24 March 2022 Friendly	Maldives	2–0	Bangladesh	Malé, Maldives
21:00 UTC+5	Raif 38'; Mahudhee 61'	Report		Stadium: National Football Stadium; Attendance: 2,500; Referee: Javiz Mohamed (Maldives)

29 March 2022 Friendly	Bangladesh	0–0	Mongolia	Sylhet, Bangladesh
17:30 UTC+6		Report		Stadium: Sylhet District Stadium; Attendance: 10,000; Referee: Bituraj Barua (Bangladesh)

1 June 2022 Friendly	Indonesia	0–0	Bangladesh	Bandung, Indonesia
20:30 UTC+7		Report		Stadium: Jalak Harupat Stadium; Attendance: 8,615; Referee: Yudi Nurcahya (Indonesia)

== Bangladesh Premier League ==
The league will start on 9 December 2022 and end 22 July 2023.

=== Table ===
Pos	Team	Pld	W	D	L	GF	GA	GD	Pts	Qualification or relegation
1	Bashundhara Kings (C, Q)	20	18	1	1	51	13	+38	55	Qualification for the AFC Champions League qualifying round
2	Dhaka Abahani (Q)	20	12	4	4	45	18	+27	40	Qualification for the AFC Cup qualifying round
3	Bangladesh Police FC	20	10	5	5	39	21	+18	35	
4	Mohammedan SC (W)	20	9	5	6	38	21	+17	32	
5	Sheikh Russel KC	20	8	6	6	33	30	+3	30	
6	Sheikh Jamal DC	20	5	9	6	25	32	−7	24	
7	Fortis FC	20	5	8	7	23	25	−2	23	
8	Chittagong Abahani	20	4	9	7	26	35	−9	21	
9	Rahmatganj MFS	20	4	7	9	15	31	−16	19	
10	Muktijoddha Sangsad KC (R)	20	4	3	13	19	42	−23	15	Relegation to 2023-24 Bangladesh Championship League
11	AFC Uttara (R)	20	0	5	15	10	56	−46	5	Relegation to 2023-24 Bangladesh Championship League

Source: Soccerway
Rules for classification: 1) Points; 2) Goal difference; 3) Goals scored.
(C) Champion; (Q) Qualify for the AFC competition; (R) Relegated; (W) Cup Winner

=== Results ===
Home \ Away	AFCU	BK	BPFC	CAL	DAL	FFC	MSC	MUK	RAH	SJDC	SRKC
AFC Uttara	—	1–1	0–7	1–1	0–7	0–1	0–6	0–1	2–3	1–3	1–1
Bashundhara Kings	3–0	—	1–0	2–0	1–0	4–1	2–1	4–0	2–0	3–0	3–1
Police FC	4–0	2–1	—	1–1	0–0	4–2	0–0	6–1	2–0	1–2	1–3
Ctg Abahani	1–0	0–3	2–3	—	3–2	0–0	1–2	2–0	2–2	1–1	2–4
Dhaka Abahani	1–0	1–2	4–1	5–1	—	1–1	2–0	3–2	4–0	3–0	3–1
Fortis FC	4–0	0–2	1–1	1–1	0–2	—	0–1	2–0	0–0	1–1	0–1
Mohammedan	6–0	0–1	1–1	2–2	1–1	3–4	—	2–0	3–1	1–1	1–2
Muktijoddha	1–1	1–3	0–1	1–2	1–0	1–1	1–6	—	1–2	2–3	1–0
Rahmatganj	1–0	0–4	0–2	1–0	1–2	1–1	0–1	0–2	—	0–0	0–0
Sheikh Jamal	3–3	1–3	1–0	2–2	1–2	0–3	0–1	1–1	2–2	—	3–2
Sheikh Russel	1–0	6–4	1–2	2–2	2–2	2–0	2–0	3–2	1–1	0–0	—

Source: Soccerway
Legend: Blue = home team win; Yellow = draw; Red = away team win.

== Federation Cup ==
=== Group A ===
Pos	Team	Pld	W	D	L	GF	GA	GD	Pts	Qualification
1	Mohammedan SC	3	2	1	0	10	2	+8	7	Advance to knockout phase
2	Rahmatganj MFS	3	2	0	1	5	2	+3	6	Advance to knockout phase
3	Sheikh Jamal DC	3	1	1	1	5	5	0	4	Advance to knockout phase
4	AFC Uttara	3	0	0	3	1	12	−11	0	

Source: Footystats
Rules for classification: Group stage tiebreakers

=== Group B ===
Pos	Team	Pld	W	D	L	GF	GA	GD	Pts	Qualification
1	Bashundhara Kings	3	3	0	0	8	3	+5	9	Advance to knockout phase
2	Chittagong Abahani	3	1	1	1	1	2	−1	4	Advance to knockout phase
3	Muktijoddha Sangsad KC	3	1	0	2	5	6	−1	3	Advance to knockout phase
4	Fortis FC	3	0	1	2	1	4	−3	1	

Source: Footystats
Rules for classification: Group stage tiebreakers

=== Group C ===
Pos	Team	Pld	W	D	L	GF	GA	GD	Pts	Qualification
1	Abahani Limited Dhaka	2	2	0	0	4	3	+1	6	Advance to knockout phase
2	Sheikh Russel KC	2	1	0	1	4	3	+1	3	Advance to knockout phase
3	Bangladesh Police FC	2	0	0	2	0	2	−2	0	

Source: Footystats
Rules for classification: Group stage tiebreakers

=== Knockout stage ===
- In the knockout stages, if a match finished goalless at the end of normal playing time, extra time would have been played (two periods of 15 minutes each) and followed, if necessary, by a penalty shoot-out to determine the winner.

=== Bracket ===
Quarter-finals
4 April–Munshigonj
Bashundhara Kings	3
Muktijoddha Sangsad KC	1
18 April–Cumilla
Chittagong Abahani	1
Mohammedan SC	4
11 April–Gopalganj
Abahani Limited Dhaka	1
Sheikh Jamal DC	0
2 May–Munshigonj
Sheikh Russel KC	1
Rahmatganj MFS	0

Semi-finals
9 May–Gopalganj
Bashundhara Kings	1
Mohammedan SC	2
16 May–Cumilla
Abahani Limited Dhaka	3
Sheikh Russel KC	0

Final
30 May–Cumilla
Mohammedan SC(p)	4 (4)
Abahani Limited Dhaka	4 (2)
Third place
23 May–Gopalganj
Bashundhara Kings	2
Sheikh Russel KC	1

34th Federation Cup (Bangladesh) 2022–23
Winners
Mohammedan SC
Eleventh Title

== AFC CUP ==
=== Play-off ===
19 April 2022 Play-off round	ATK Mohun Bagan (India)	3-1	(Bangladesh) Abahani Limited Dhaka	Vivekananda Yuba Bharati Krirangan, Kolkata
19:00 UTC+5:30	Williams 6', 30', 85'	Report	Colindres 61'	Attendance: 31,925

=== Group D ===
Pos	Team	Pld	W	D	L	GF	GA	GD	Pts	Qualification	MBSG	BSK	MAZ	GOK
1	(India) ATK Mohun Bagan (H)	3	2	0	1	11	6	+5	6 (Note: Head-to-head points: ATK Mohun Bagan 3, Bashundhara Kings 0.)	Inter-zone play-off semi-finals	—	4–0	—	—
2	(Bangladesh) Bashundhara Kings	3	2	0	1	3	5	−2	6		—	—	1–0	—
3	(Maldives) Maziya	3	1	0	2	3	6	−3	3 (Note: Head-to-head points: Maziya 3, Gokulam Kerala 0.)		2–5	—	—	1–0
4	(India) Gokulam Kerala	3	1	0	2	5	5	0	3		4–2	1–2	—	—

Source: AFC
(H) Hosts
Notes:

18 May 2022	Bashundhara Kings (Bangladesh)	1-0	(Maldives) Maziya	Vivekananda Yuba Bharati Krirangan, Kolkata
	Marong 33'	Report		Attendance: 259

21 May 2022	ATK Mohun Bagan (India)	4-0	(Bangladesh) Bashundhara Kings	Vivekananda Yuba Bharati Krirangan, Kolkata
16:30 UTC+5:30	Colaco 25', 34', 53'; Williams 77'	Report		Attendance: 34,595

24 May 2022	Gokulam Kerala (India)	1-2	(Bangladesh) Bashundhara Kings	Vivekananda Yuba Bharati Krirangan, Kolkata
16:30 UTC+5:30	Fletcher 75'	Report	Robinho 36'; Marong 54'	Attendance: 497

== Women's Football ==
The league was supposed to start in November 2022 and end in March 2023. .

== Bangladesh Championship League ==
The league started on 12 December 2022 and ended on 3 April 2023.

=== League table ===
Pos	Team	Pld	W	D	L	GF	GA	GD	Pts	BPL
1	Brothers Union (C, P)	20	16	3	1	30	7	+23	51	Qualification to 2023–24 Bangladesh Premier League
2	BFF Elite Academy (Note: BFF Elite Academy is not eligible for promotion or relegation from the Bangladesh Championship League.)	20	15	1	4	47	17	+30	46	
3	Gopalganj Sporting Club (P)	20	11	1	8	33	27	+6	34	Qualification to 2023–24 Bangladesh Premier League
4	Fakirerpool YMC	20	8	5	7	22	24	−2	29	
5	NoFeL Sporting Club	20	6	7	7	26	25	+1	25	
6	Wari Club	20	6	7	7	23	24	−1	25	
7	Dhaka Wanderers	20	6	6	8	26	27	−1	24	
8	Fortis FC Academy	20	5	7	8	16	22	−6	22	
9	Uttara FC	20	5	5	10	16	23	−7	20	
10	Swadhinata KS (R)	20	5	4	11	20	34	−14	19	Relegation to Senior Division League
11	Little Friends Club (R)	20	3	2	15	11	40	−29	11	Relegation to Senior Division League

Source: Global Sports Archive
Rules for classification: 1) Points; 2) Goal difference; 3) Goals scored;
(C) Champions; (P) Promoted; (R) Relegated

== Dhaka Football League ==
=== Second Division ===
==== League table ====
Pos	Team	Pld	W	D	L	GF	GA	GD	Pts	Qualification
1	Jatrabari JS	14	11	3	0	25	8	+17	36	Qualification for the 2023–24 Dhaka Senior Division League
2	Arambagh FA	14	6	4	4	4	8	−4	22	Qualification for the 2023–24 Dhaka Senior Division League
3	Kallol Sangha	14	5	6	3	18	10	+8	21	
4	Bikrampur Kings	14	5	6	3	12	12	0	21	
5	Purbachal Parishad	14	4	8	2	15	10	+5	20	
6	Jabid Ahsan Sohel KC	14	4	5	5	24	20	+4	17	
7	Victoria SC	14	4	5	5	22	23	−1	17	
8	Kingstar SC	14	4	5	5	11	15	−4	17	
9	Dilkusha SC	14	3	8	3	11	16	−5	17	
10	BKSP (Note: BKSP were disqualified from the league by BFF after the club's management was linked to signing players under fake names. BKSP's matchday 12 opponents, Arambagh FA and matchday 14 opponents, Kallol Sangha, were both awarded 3-0 victories.)	14	7	2	5	19	17	+2	23	
11	Gouripur SC	14	4	4	6	11	19	−8	16	
12	Tongi KC	14	4	2	8	12	18	−6	14	
13	BG Press S&RC	14	2	7	5	12	15	−3	13	
14	City Club (Note: City Club were given permission to enter the professional second-tier league, the Bangladesh Championship League from the 2024–25 season.)	14	1	9	4	8	13	−5	12	Relegation to Dhaka Third Division Football League
15	Kadamtola Sangsad	14	2	4	8	9	18	−9	10	Relegation to Dhaka Third Division Football League

Source: BFF

=== Third Division ===
==== League table ====
Pos	Team	Pld	W	D	L	GF	GA	GD	Pts	Qualification
1	Chawkbazar Kings (C, P)	14	12	1	1	46	8	+38	37	Qualification for the Dhaka Second Division Football League
2	Elias Ahmed Chowdhury SS (P)	14	9	3	2	24	7	+17	30	Qualification for the Dhaka Second Division Football League
3	Skylark FC	14	9	2	3	25	8	+17	29	
4	FC Uttar Bongo	14	7	6	1	23	8	+15	27	
5	Green Welfare Center Munshigonj	14	6	4	4	21	14	+7	22	
6	FC Brahmanbaria	14	5	7	2	21	16	+5	22	
7	Asaduzzaman FA	14	6	3	5	27	18	+9	21	
8	Dipali Jubo Sangha	14	4	6	4	13	13	0	18	
9	Lalbagh SC	14	4	5	5	13	12	+1	17	
10	Shantinagar Club	14	4	5	5	13	19	−6	17	
11	Rainbow AC	14	3	7	4	13	20	−7	16	
12	The Muslims Institute	14	4	3	7	15	23	−8	15	
13	Tangail FA	14	2	2	10	17	37	−20	8	
14	Uttara Friends Club (R)	14	1	3	10	9	31	−22	6	Relegation to Pioneer Football League
15	Wazed Miah KC (Note: Wazed Miah were disqualified and placed at the bottom of the league table by BFF after they didn't come to field in 10th round. Their opponents from 10th and remaining rounds were awarded 3-0 win each.) (D, R)	14	0	1	13	3	49	−46	1	Relegation to Pioneer Football League

Updated to match(es) played on unknown. Source: Score7
(C) Champions; (D) Disqualified; (P) Promoted; (R) Relegated
