= List of football clubs in Bangladesh =

Football club in Bangladesh

This is a list of football clubs in Bangladesh that participate in the professional and semi-professional levels of the Bangladeshi football league system.

== Professional league ==
=== Bangladesh Football League (1st tier) ===
2024/25 season
Club	District	Stadium	Capacity	Founded
Bangladesh Police	Dhaka	Rafiq Uddin Bhuiyan Stadium (Mymensingh)	25,000	
Bashundhara Kings	Dhaka	Bashundhara Kings Arena	6,000	2013
Brothers Union	Dhaka	Bir Sreshtho Matiur Rahman Stadium (Munshiganj)	10,000	1949
Chittagong Abahani	Chittagong	Rafiq Uddin Bhuiyan Stadium (Mymensingh)	25,000	1980
Dhaka Abahani	Dhaka	Shaheed Dhirendranath Datta Stadium (Comilla)	18,000	1972
Dhaka Mohammedan	Dhaka	Shaheed Dhirendranath Datta Stadium (Comilla)	18,000	1936
Dhaka Wanderers	Dhaka	Shaheed Barkat Stadium (Gazipur)	25,000	1937
Fakirerpool YMC	Dhaka	Shaheed Barkat Stadium (Gazipur)	25,000	1960
Fortis FC	Dhaka	Bashundhara Kings Arena	6,000	2020
Rahmatganj MFS	Dhaka	Bir Sreshtho Matiur Rahman Stadium (Munshiganj)	10,000	1933

=== Bangladesh Championship League (2nd tier) ===
2024/25 season
Club	District	Stadium	Capacity	Founded
Arambagh KS	Dhaka	BSSS Mostafa Kamal Stadium	25,000	1958
BFF Elite Academy	Dhaka	BSSS Mostafa Kamal Stadium	25,000	2021
BRTC SC	Dhaka	BSSS Mostafa Kamal Stadium	25,000	1966
City Club	Dhaka	BSSS Mostafa Kamal Stadium	25,000	1972
Dhaka Rangers FC	Dhaka	BSSS Mostafa Kamal Stadium	25,000	2022
Farashganj SC	Dhaka	BSSS Mostafa Kamal Stadium	25,000	1959
Little Friends Club	Dhaka	BSSS Mostafa Kamal Stadium	25,000	1974
NoFeL SC	Noakhali	BSSS Mostafa Kamal Stadium (Dhaka)	25,000	2017
PWD SC	Dhaka	BSSS Mostafa Kamal Stadium	25,000	1954
Uttar Baridhara	Dhaka	BSSS Mostafa Kamal Stadium	25,000	1995
Wari Club	Dhaka	BSSS Mostafa Kamal Stadium	25,000	1898

== Semi-professional league ==
=== Dhaka Senior Division League (3rd tier) ===
2024/25 season
Club	District	Stadium	Capacity	Founded
Arambagh FA	Dhaka	BSSS Mostafa Kamal Stadium	25,000	1981
Badda Jagoroni Sangsad	Dhaka	BSSS Mostafa Kamal Stadium	25,000	
Bangladesh Boys Club	Dhaka	BSSS Mostafa Kamal Stadium	25,000	1954
Basabo Tarun Sangha	Dhaka	BSSS Mostafa Kamal Stadium	25,000	1956
Jatrabari KC	Dhaka	BSSS Mostafa Kamal Stadium	25,000	
Jatrabari JS	Dhaka	BSSS Mostafa Kamal Stadium	25,000	1987
Somaj Kallyan KS Mugda	Dhaka	BSSS Mostafa Kamal Stadium	25,000	1979
Kashaituly SKP	Dhaka	BSSS Mostafa Kamal Stadium	25,000	1993
Mohakhali Ekadosh	Dhaka	BSSS Mostafa Kamal Stadium	25,000	1985
Nobabpur KC	Dhaka	BSSS Mostafa Kamal Stadium	25,000	2001
East End Club	Dhaka	BSSS Mostafa Kamal Stadium	25,000	1933
Sadharan Bima CSC	Dhaka	BSSS Mostafa Kamal Stadium	25,000	1973
Siddique Bazar Dhaka Junior SC	Dhaka	BSSS Mostafa Kamal Stadium	25,000	1986
Swadhinata KS	Dhaka	BSSS Mostafa Kamal Stadium	25,000	2005
T&T Club Motijheel	Dhaka	BSSS Mostafa Kamal Stadium	25,000	1962
Uttara FC	Dhaka	BSSS Mostafa Kamal Stadium	25,000	2020

=== Dhaka Second Division League (4th tier) ===
2024/25 season
Club	District	Stadium	Capacity	Founded
BG Press SRC	Dhaka	BSSS Mostafa Kamal Stadium	25,000	1949
BKSP	Dhaka	BSSS Mostafa Kamal Stadium	25,000	1986
Bikrampur Kings	Munshiganj	BSSS Mostafa Kamal Stadium (Dhaka)	25,000	2019
Chawkbazar Kings	Dhaka	BSSS Mostafa Kamal Stadium	25,000	
Dilkusha SC	Dhaka	BSSS Mostafa Kamal Stadium	25,000	1960
Eliash Ahmed Chowdhury SS	Madaripur	BSSS Mostafa Kamal Stadium (Dhaka)	25,000	
Gouripur SC	Comilla	BSSS Mostafa Kamal Stadium (Dhaka)	25,000	2006
Jabid Ahsan Sohel KC	Dhaka	BSSS Mostafa Kamal Stadium	25,000	
Purbachal Parishad	Dhaka	BSSS Mostafa Kamal Stadium	25,000	1952
Tongi Krira Chakra	Gazipur	BSSS Mostafa Kamal Stadium (Dhaka)	25,000	1962
Victoria SC	Dhaka	BSSS Mostafa Kamal Stadium	25,000	1903

=== Dhaka Third Division League (5th tier) ===
2024/25 season
Club	District	Stadium	Capacity	Founded
Asaduzzaman FA	Magura	BSSS Mostafa Kamal Stadium (Dhaka)	25,000	2012
Dipali Jubo Sangha	Dhaka	BSSS Mostafa Kamal Stadium	25,000	1960
FC Brahmanbaria	Brahmanbaria	BSSS Mostafa Kamal Stadium (Dhaka)	25,000	2017
FC Uttar Bongo	Kurigram	BSSS Mostafa Kamal Stadium (Dhaka)	25,000	2019
Green Welfare CM	Munshiganj	BSSS Mostafa Kamal Stadium (Dhaka)	25,000	
Lalbagh SC	Dhaka	BSSS Mostafa Kamal Stadium	25,000	1962
Rainbow AC	Narayanganj	BSSS Mostafa Kamal Stadium (Dhaka)	25,000	1942
Shantinagar Club	Dhaka	BSSS Mostafa Kamal Stadium	25,000	1956
Skylark FC	Dhaka	BSSS Mostafa Kamal Stadium	25,000	2021
The Muslims Institute	Dhaka	BSSS Mostafa Kamal Stadium	25,000	1938
Tangail FA	Tangail	BSSS Mostafa Kamal Stadium (Dhaka)	25,000	2010
Barishal FA	Barishal	BSSS Mostafa Kamal Stadium (Dhaka)	25,000	2020
Green Voice KBC	Kurigram	BSSS Mostafa Kamal Stadium (Dhaka)	25,000	2020
Prantik Junior	Dhaka	BSSS Mostafa Kamal Stadium	25,000	
Feni SA	Feni	BSSS Mostafa Kamal Stadium (Dhaka)	25,000	

== Services teams ==
- Bangladesh Police FC is the only services team participating in the domestic league as of the 2024/25 season.

Club	Competition	Stadium	Capacity	Founded
Bangladesh Army	National Football Championship	Bangladesh Army Stadium (Dhaka)	20,000	1973
Bangladesh Navy	National Football Championship			1971
Bangladesh Air Force	National Football Championship			1972

== Dissolved clubs ==
Club	District	Last competition	Stadium	Capacity	Founded	Inactive
Fire Service AC	Dhaka					
East Pakistan Gymkhana	Dhaka				1948	
Pakistan Eastern Railway	Chittagong					
WAPDA SC	Dhaka					
Adamjee SCC	Dhaka	2003–04 Second Division League	BSSS Mostafa Kamal Stadium	25,000	1981	2004
Narayanganj SS	Narayanganj	2009–10 Bangladesh League	Narayanganj Osmani Stadium (Narayanganj)	4,000	1974	2010
Beanibazar SC	Sylhet	2012 Championship League	Sylhet District Stadium (Sylhet)	15,000	2009	2012
Team BJMC	Dhaka	2018–19 Premier League	Shaheed Bulu Stadium (Noakhali)	10,000	1963	2019
Feni SC	Feni	2018–19 Championship League	Shaheed Salam Stadium (Feni)	5,000	1988	2019
Dhaka United SC	Dhaka	2018–19 Senior Division League	BSSS Mostafa Kamal Stadium	25,000	2012	2019
Dhaka City FC	Dhaka	2018–19 Senior Division League	BSSS Mostafa Kamal Stadium	25,000	2017	2021
Saif SC	Dhaka	2021–22 Premier League	Munshiganj Stadium (Munshiganj)	10,000	2016	2022

== Inactive clubs ==
Club	District	Last competition	Stadium	Capacity	Founded	Inactive
Azad SC	Dhaka	1996 Pioneer League	Outer Stadium Ground	10,000	1949	1998
AFC Uttara	Dhaka	2022–23 Premier League	Rafiq Uddin Bhuiyan Stadium (Mymensingh)	5,000	2021	2023
Gopalganj SC	Gopalganj	2022–23 Championship League	Sheikh Fazlul Haque Mani Stadium (Gopalganj)	25,000	2009	2022
Sheikh Jamal DC	Dhaka	2024–25 Premier League	Sheikh Fazlul Haque Mani Stadium (Gopalganj)	5,000	1962	2025
Sheikh Russel KC	Dhaka	2024–25 Premier League	Bashundhara Kings Arena	6,000	1995	2025

== See also ==
- Bangladesh association football league system
- List of women's football clubs in Bangladesh
