= Siddique Bazar Dhaka Junior SC =

Bangladeshi Association football club

- Full name: Siddique Bazar Dhaka Junior Sporting Club
- Nickname: Dhaka Junior SC
- Founded: 1986; 40 years ago
- Ground: BSSS Mostafa Kamal Stadium
- Capacity: 25,000
- President: Alhaj Ismail Hossain
- Head Coach: Md Murad Ahmed Milon
- League: Dhaka Senior Division League
- 2025–26: 14th of 17
Home colours	Away colours

Siddique Bazar Dhaka Junior Sporting Club (Bengali: সিদ্দিক বাজার ঢাকা জুনিয়র স্পোর্টিং ক্লাব) is a Bangladeshi football club based in the Siddique Bazar, Dhaka. It currently competes in the Dhaka Senior Division League, the third-tier of Bangladeshi football.

== History ==
The club was established in Siddique Bazar area of Dhaka in 1986.

The club entered the Dhaka Third Division League in 2005 after finishing runners-up in the 2004 Pioneer League.

The club earned promotion from the Dhaka Third Division League as the third-place team in the 2018 season. In their first season participating in the Dhaka Second Division League, in the 2021–22 season, the club finished as runners-up and were promoted to the Dhaka Senior Division League, Dhaka's top tier and the country's third tier.

== Current squad ==
As of 25 September 2025

Note: Flags indicate national team as defined under FIFA eligibility rules; some limited exceptions apply. Players may hold more than one non-FIFA nationality.

No.	Pos.	Nation	Player
1	GK	BAN	Toha Alom
2	DF	BAN	Khalil Kaji
3	DF	BAN	Md Noyon Hossain
4	DF	BAN	Md Mamun Hossain
5	DF	BAN	Md Mofizur Rahman Mithu
6	MF	BAN	Rian Sikder
7	MF	BAN	Kazi Atiqur Rahman
8	MF	BAN	Emon Barua
9	FW	BAN	Riaz Khalifa (Captain)
10	FW	BAN	Lakhan Cyhandra Barman
11	FW	BAN	Sheikh Ahmed
12	MF	BAN	Md Monzorul Aloam
13	DF	BAN	Md Najmul Haque
14	DF	BAN	Md Nurnobi Somrat
15	DF	BAN	Shejul Ahmed Shahriya
16	MF	BAN	Dulal Mridha
17	MF	BAN	Md Milon Islam
18	FW	BAN	Rubayet Hossain

No.	Pos.	Nation	Player
19	FW	BAN	Sohag Hossain
20	FW	BAN	Mehedi Hasan
21	FW	BAN	Rashichansra Tripura
22	GK	BAN	Obayed Hossain Shovo
23	FW	BAN	Markoni Joy Tudu
24	DF	BAN	Md Fakrul Islam
25	DF	BAN	Naimul Hasan
26	DF	BAN	Md Rana
27	DF	BAN	Md Rafiul Islam
28	DF	BAN	Md Mohasin Ali
29	FW	BAN	Md Ashraful Huq
30	GK	BAN	Md Rakibul Islam Shaon
31	DF	BAN	Imrul Kayes
32	FW	BAN	Riyad Hossain
33	FW	BAN	Monjurul Islam Parves
34	MF	BAN	Kazi Maharab Hossain Joy
90	FW	BAN	Md Ahad Bappi

== Personnel ==
=== Current technical staff ===
As of 18 July 2024

Position	Name
Head Coach	(Bangladesh) Md Murad Ahmed Milon
Team Manager	(Bangladesh) Md Ahad Bappi
Team Leader	(Bangladesh) Md Rahmat Ullah Shohag
Assistant Manager	(Bangladesh) Md Rubel
Goalkeeper Coach	(Bangladesh) Khandoker Minarur Rahman
Media Officer	(Bangladesh) Md Yasin
Equipment Manager	(Bangladesh) Md Asraful Kabir Rocky
Trainer	(Bangladesh) Md Milon

== Team records ==
=== Head coach record ===
As of 19 January 2026

Head Coach	From	To	P	W	D	L	GS	GA	%W
(Bangladesh) Md Murad Ahmed Milon	15 June 2024	Present	22	7	4	11	30	42	31.82

== Honours ==
- Dhaka Second Division League
  - Runners-up (1): 2021–22
- Pioneer League
  - Runners-up (1): 2004

== See also ==
- List of football clubs in Bangladesh
- History of football in Bangladesh
