= 2022–23 Dhaka Third Division League =

Bangladeshi football league season

Dhaka Third Division Football League
- Season: 2022–23
- Dates: 10 June 2023–23 August 2023
- Champions: Chawkbazar Kings
- Promoted: Chawkbazar Kings; Elias Ahmed Chowdhury SS
- Relegated: Wazed Miah KC; Uttara Friends Club
- Matches: 105
- Goals: 283 (2.7 per match)
- Top goalscorer: 11 Goals (Bangladesh) Tamim Hossain (The Muslim Institute) (Bangladesh) Abir Hossain (Chawkbazar Kings)
- Biggest win: Chawkbazar Kings 13–0 Wazed Miah KC (30 July 2023)
- Highest scoring: Chawkbazar Kings 13–0 Wazed Miah KC (30 July 2023)
- Longest winning run: 8 games Chawkbazar Kings
- Longest unbeaten run: 13 games Chawkbazar Kings
- Longest winless run: 14 games Wazed Miah KC
- Longest losing run: 8 games Wazed Miah KC

2022–23 Dhaka Third Division Football League (Bengali: ২০২২-২৩ ঢাকা তৃতীয় বিভাগ ফুটবল লিগ), officially known as Bashundhara Group Third Division (U-17) Football League 2022–23 due to sponsorship reasons and change of format, is the 2022–23 edition of the fifth-tier in the Bangladeshi football league system.

The previous edition of the league was not held as the Bangladesh Football Federation had initially decided to shut it down and merge it with the Dhaka Second Division Football League, in September 2022. However, it was later decided that the Dhaka Third Division would continue, with a new format which will see it become an U-17 football league. A total of 15 football clubs participated in the league. The season ran from 10 June 2023 to 23 August 2023.

Alamgir Somaj Kallyan KS were the defending champions having won it in the 2019–20 season.

== Promotion and relegation ==
The following teams have changed division since the previous season:

=== Entered ===
Promoted from Pioneer Football League (2019–20)

- Elias Ahmed Chowdhury SS
- FC Uttar Bongo
- FC Brahmanbaria
- Green Welfare Center Munshigonj

Direct-entry

- Skylark Football Club

Did not enter

- Relegated clubs from the previous (2021–22) Dhaka Second Division Football League season – Alamgir Shomaj Kollayan KS and Khilgaon FA, did not enter the league this year, as the 2020–21 Dhaka Third Division Football League season was not held. The clubs are scheduled to participate in the league's next edition.

=== Left ===
Promoted to the Dhaka Second Division Football League (2021–22)

- Alamgir Shomaj Kollayan KS
- Kingstar Sporting Club
- Kallol Shangha
- Jabid Ahsan Sohel KC
- Bikrampur Kings

Relegated to Pioneer Football League (2021–22)

- Fakirerpool Shurjo Torun Shangha
- Chawkbazar United

Withdrawal

- Araf Sporting Club decided against participating in the 2022–23 season.

=== Other ===
- Narinda Junior Lions Club will go by the name Chawkbazar United from the 2022–23 season.

== Participating clubs ==
Team	Location
Asaduzzaman Football Academy	Magura
Chawkbazar Kings	(Chowk Bazaar), Dhaka
Dipali Jubo Sangha	Dhaka
Elias Ahmed Chowdhury Smrity Sangha	Madaripur
FC Brahmanbaria	Brahmanbaria
FC Uttar Bongo	Kurigram
Green Welfare Center Munshigonj	Munshiganj
Lalbagh Sporting Club	(Lalbagh), Dhaka
Rainbow Athletic Club	Narayanganj
Shantinagar Club	(Shantinagar), Dhaka
Skylark Football Club	(Paltan), Dhaka
The Muslims Institute	Dhaka
Tangail Football Academy	Tangail
Uttara Friends Club	(Uttara), Dhaka
Wazed Miah Krira Chakra	Rangpur

== Venue ==
All matches were played at the BSSS Mostafa Kamal Stadium in Dhaka, Bangladesh.

Dhaka	Dhaka is located in Bangladesh
BSSS Mostafa Kamal Stadium	Dhaka is located in Bangladesh
Capacity: 25,000	Dhaka is located in Bangladesh

== League table ==
Pos	Team	Pld	W	D	L	GF	GA	GD	Pts	Qualification
1	Chawkbazar Kings (C, P)	14	12	1	1	46	8	+38	37	Qualification for the Dhaka Second Division Football League
2	Elias Ahmed Chowdhury SS (P)	14	9	3	2	24	7	+17	30	Qualification for the Dhaka Second Division Football League
3	Skylark FC	14	9	2	3	25	8	+17	29	
4	FC Uttar Bongo	14	7	6	1	23	8	+15	27	
5	Green Welfare Center Munshigonj	14	6	4	4	21	14	+7	22	
6	FC Brahmanbaria	14	5	7	2	21	16	+5	22	
7	Asaduzzaman FA	14	6	3	5	27	18	+9	21	
8	Dipali Jubo Sangha	14	4	6	4	13	13	0	18	
9	Lalbagh SC	14	4	5	5	13	12	+1	17	
10	Shantinagar Club	14	4	5	5	13	19	−6	17	
11	Rainbow AC	14	3	7	4	13	20	−7	16	
12	The Muslims Institute	14	4	3	7	15	23	−8	15	
13	Tangail FA	14	2	2	10	17	37	−20	8	
14	Uttara Friends Club (R)	14	1	3	10	9	31	−22	6	Relegation to Pioneer Football League
15	Wazed Miah KC (Note: Wazed Miah were disqualified and placed at the bottom of the league table by BFF after they didn't come to field in 10th round. Their opponents from 10th and remaining rounds were awarded 3-0 win each.) (D, R)	14	0	1	13	3	49	−46	1	Relegation to Pioneer Football League

Updated to match(es) played on unknown. Source: Score7
(C) Champions; (D) Disqualified; (P) Promoted; (R) Relegated

== Awards ==
Award	Winner	Club
Golden Boot	(Bangladesh) Tamim Hossain	The Muslim Institute
Golden Boot	(Bangladesh) Abir Hossain	Chawkbazar Kings
Fair Play Trophy		Shantinagar Club
