= Kashaituly SKP =

Association football club based in Dhaka, Bangladesh

Kashaituly SKP কসাইটুলি এসকেপি
- Full name: Kashaituly Samaj Kollayan Parishad
- Short name: KSKP
- Founded: 1993; 33 years ago
- Ground: BSSS Mostafa Kamal Stadium
- Capacity: 25,000
- President: Md Samiul Islam Abir
- Head Coach: Naimur Rahman Sahed
- League: Dhaka Senior Division League
- 2025–26: 4th of 17
Home colours	Away colours

Kashaituly SKP (Bengali: কসাইটুলি এসকেপি) is a Bangladeshi football club based in Old Dhaka. It currently competes in the Dhaka Senior Division League, the third-tier of Bangladeshi football.

== History ==
The club was established in Old Dhaka in 1993. In 1995, the club won the Pioneer League and entered divisional football in Dhaka. In the 1997 edition of the Third Division, the club was crowned champion and secured a place in the 1999 Second Division. They were relegated from the league in the 2001–02 edition and would return after finishing in third-place in the 2013 Third Division. In the Second Division, the club finished as runners-up in the 2017 season, earning promotion to the Senior Division, now serving as the third-tier of the country's football and the top-division in Dhaka.

== Current squad ==
As of 10 November 2025

Note: Flags indicate national team as defined under FIFA eligibility rules; some limited exceptions apply. Players may hold more than one non-FIFA nationality.

No.	Pos.	Nation	Player
1	GK	BAN	Md Masud Rana
2	DF	BAN	Sazib Islam
3	DF	BAN	Pronoy Enosent Marandi
4	DF	BAN	Mohammad Obaidullah
5	DF	BAN	Sabug Chandra Das
6	MF	BAN	Md Shahadat Ali
7	MF	BAN	Md Raihan Hossain
8	MF	BAN	Luis Kisshu
9	FW	BAN	Rafael Mardi (Captain)
10	FW	BAN	Md Sohel Ahmed
11	FW	BAN	Arman Ibne Amin
12	FW	BAN	Md Ashikur Rahman
13	DF	BAN	Roton Hembrom
14	DF	BAN	Ripon Tudu
15	MF	BAN	Pronoy Augustin Hembrom
16	MF	BAN	Himu Morol
17	MF	BAN	Steve Sudipto Murmu
18	FW	BAN	Titas Kusur

No.	Pos.	Nation	Player
19	FW	BAN	Abdul Mutalib
20	FW	BAN	Md Didarul
21	DF	BAN	Rafikul Islam Rahat
22	GK	BAN	Md Bappy Hasan
23	DF	BAN	Sakil Khan
24	FW	BAN	Subhas Kumar
25	GK	BAN	Mollah Khalid Hosen
26	MF	BAN	Md Yeasin Sheikh
27	FW	BAN	Md Morsalin Islam
28	MF	BAN	Hasibul Islam Porosh
29	DF	BAN	Md Arif
30	GK	BAN	Md Shiam Hossain
31	FW	BAN	Hriday Moral
32	MF	BAN	Ariful Islam
33	MF	BAN	Md Shamim Hossen
34	MF	BAN	Md Sabbir Ahmed
35	MF	BAN	Sagor Ahammed

== Personnel ==
=== Current coaching staff ===
As of 1 July 2024

Position	Name
Team Manager	(Bangladesh) Md Babul Hossain
Team Leader	(Bangladesh) Md Rahat Mitu
Assistant Manager	(Bangladesh) Md Abed Hossain
Head Coach	(Bangladesh) Tuhin Kumar Dey
Assistant Coach	(Bangladesh) Asif Hossain Rimon
Media Manager	(Bangladesh) Md Faruq
Equipment Manager	(Bangladesh) Istiak Uddin Faruk
Security Officer	(Bangladesh) Md Imtiaz Uddin
Fitness Trainer	(Bangladesh) Shourav Hossain Shad

== Team records ==
=== Head coaches record ===
As of 21 January 2026

Head Coach	From	To	P	W	D	L	GS	GA	%W
(Bangladesh) Tuhin Kumar Dey	15 April 2024	5 September 2024	4	2	1	1	5	4	50.00
(Bangladesh) Naimur Rahman Sahed	15 June 2025	Present	16	9	4	3	26	9	56.25

== Honours ==
- Dhaka Second Division League
  - Runners-up (1): 2017
- Dhaka Third Division League
  - Champions (1): 1997
- Pioneer League
  - Runners-up (1): 1995

== See also ==
- List of football clubs in Bangladesh
- History of football in Bangladesh
