= Eskaton Sabuj Sangha Club =

Eskaton Sabuj Sangha Club ইস্কাটন সবুজ সংঘ ক্লাব
- Full name: Eskaton Sabuj Sangha Club
- Founded: 1972; 54 years ago
- Ground: Outer Stadium Ground, Paltan
- Capacity: 10,000
- Chairman: Shawkat Hossain Nannu
- League: Pioneer Football League
- 2022: Zonal League
Home colours	Away colours

Eskaton Sabuj Sangha Club (Bengali: ইস্কাটন সবুজ সংঘ ক্লাব) is an association football club based in the Eskaton area of Dhaka, Bangladesh. The club currently competes in the Pioneer Football League, the sixth-tier of Bangladeshi football.

== History ==
Eskaton Sabuj Sangha Club was founded in 1972 in the Old Eskaton area of Dhaka. The club entered domestic football in 1988, under coach Akbar Bablu. The club earned successive promotions between 1988 and 1990, winning the Dhaka Third Division League in the 1988–89 season and the Dhaka Second Division League in the 1989–90 season. Following their promotion to the First Division, they earned a notable victory over Brothers Union in their first top-tier league game in 1992. They finished sixteenth in the twenty club league in their first top-tier season.

Before the 1993 league season set about, the Bangladesh Football Federation introduced a Premier Division Football League in Dhaka, however, the bottom 10 clubs from the previous top-tier league season remained in the Dhaka First Division League, thus, Eskaton's journey as a top-tier club was cut short. Within a few years, the club was left languishing in the country's lower divisions while also running a junior team in the Pioneer Football League. The club was inactive for a few years, after competing in the then fourth-tier, the Dhaka Third Division League in 2003.

In 2019, the club participated in the Pioneer Football League, now the country's sixth-tier. In 2020, they missed out on promotion, after being knocked out of the quarter-finals of the by Elias Ahmed CS. In recent times, Eskaton has been found running illegal casinos in its clubhouse and were one of the numerous sports clubs to have been invaded by the police during the Bangladesh Casino Scandal in 2019.

== Honours ==
- Dhaka Second Division League
  - Champions (1): 1989–90
- Dhaka Third Division League
  - Champions (1): 1988–89
