= Jatrabari JS =

Bangladeshi Association football club

- Full name: Jatrabari Jhatika Sangsad
- Founded: 1987; 39 years ago
- Ground: BSSS Mostafa Kamal Stadium
- Capacity: 25,000
- President: Samir Kumar Sentu
- Head Coach: Md Shahidul Islam
- League: Dhaka Second Division Football League
- 2026–27 season: TBD
Home colours	Away colours

Jatrabari Jhatika Sangsad (Bengali: যাত্রাবাড়ীর ঝটিকা সংসদ) is a Bangladeshi football club based in the Jatrabari, Dhaka. It currently competes in the Dhaka Senior Division League, the third-tier of Bangladeshi football.

== History ==
The club was established in 1987 in Jatrabari Thana of Dhaka.

The club participated in the Pioneer League until 2008. They were given direct entry into the Third Division League in 2011. The club earned promotion to the Second Division after finishing in the fifth and final promotion place during the 2018 season. The club successfully pursued the 2022–23 season title and were promoted to the Senior Division League, under the coaching of Arman Hossain. The club's striker Aryan Sikder also finished as the league's top scorer with 11 goals.

== Current squad ==
As of 18 July 2024

Note: Flags indicate national team as defined under FIFA eligibility rules; some limited exceptions apply. Players may hold more than one non-FIFA nationality.

No.	Pos.	Nation	Player
1	GK	BAN	Abdul Al Maruf
2	DF	BAN	Md Helal
3	DF	BAN	Md Saiful Sardar
4	DF	BAN	Aung Cho Tun
5	DF	BAN	Hilsang Chai Marma
6	MF	BAN	Md Sakib Sarker
7	MF	BAN	Noyon Mia
8	MF	BAN	Md Ranjan Howlader
9	MF	BAN	Raj Uddin (Captain)
10	FW	BAN	Md Nur Alam Siddik
11	FW	BAN	Fayjul Karim
12	FW	BAN	Nishad Mahmud
13	DF	BAN	Asif
14	DF	BAN	Tonmoy Mondol
15	MF	BAN	Md Parvez Mia
16	DF	BAN	Plabon Kujur
17	MF	BAN	Md Shahidul Khandakar
18	MF	BAN	Kamran Sheikh

No.	Pos.	Nation	Player
19	MF	BAN	Emon Mia
20	FW	BAN	Sujon Mahet
21	MF	BAN	Md Sabbir Ahmed Moni
22	GK	BAN	Md Robiul Karim
23	MF	BAN	Md Tanjilur Islam Antu
24	FW	BAN	Arbit Ray
25	GK	BAN	Naeem Ahammad Moral
26	MF	BAN	Ripon Kumar Dash
27	DF	BAN	Abidur Rahman
28	MF	BAN	Md Murad Hossain
29	MF	BAN	Md Roriqul Islam
31	MF	BAN	Md Sadik Ahmed
32	DF	BAN	Md Rafiur Rahman Sahel
33	FW	BAN	Md Al Amin
35	GK	BAN	Ali Ahmed
88	DF	BAN	Rahul Kamali Kamran
99	FW	BAN	Md Jahedul Islam

== Personnel ==
=== Current coaching staff ===
As of 25 July 2024

Position	Name
Team Manager	(Bangladesh) JKS Marshall
Team Leader	(Bangladesh) Md Abdul Kader
Assistant Manager	(Bangladesh) Abdul Akher Babu
Head Coach	(Bangladesh) Md Arman Hossain
Goalkeeping Coach	(Bangladesh) Mohit Karmakar
Physio	(Bangladesh) Sharif Nasim Reza
Equipment Manager	(Bangladesh) Md Joshim Uddin Chowdhury
Fitness Trainer	(Bangladesh) Md Habib
Ball Boy	(Bangladesh) Md Billal Hossain

== Team records ==
=== Coaching records ===
As of 3 July 2026

Head Coach	From	To	P	W	D	L	GS	GA	%W
(Bangladesh) Arman Hossain	7 October 2023	Present	14	11	3	0	25	8	78.57
(Bangladesh) Md Shahidul Islam	5 May 2026	Present	1	0	1	0	1	1	0.00

== Honours ==
- Dhaka Second Division League
  - Champions (1): 2022–23

== See also ==
- List of football clubs in Bangladesh
- History of football in Bangladesh
