= FC Brahmanbaria =

FC Brahmanbaria এফসি ব্রাহ্মণবাড়িয়া
- Full name: Football Club Brahmanbaria
- Founded: 22-02-2017
- Ground: Niaz Mohammad Stadium, Brahmanbaria
- Capacity: 15,000
- President: Md Biplob Hossain Mitu (Acting President)
- Owner: Md Shahadat Hossain
- League: Dhaka Third Division League
- 2022–23: TBD
- Website: https://www.facebook.com/FcBrahmanbaria

Football Club Brahmanbaria (Bengali: এফসি ব্রাহ্মণবাড়িয়া), is an association football club based in the Brahmanbaria, Bangladesh. The club currently competes in the Dhaka Third Division League, the fifth-tier of Bangladeshi football.

Active departments of FC Brahmanbaria
- Football (Men's): Football (Women's)

== History ==
In 2017, the club took part in the sixth-tier national league, the Pioneer Football League for the first time. They were knocked out of the play-off round by Sunrise Sporting Club. In 2020, they were knocked out of the semi-finals after suffering a 2–1 defeat at the hands of Elias Ahmed Chowdhury SS. Nonetheless, the club were promoted to the Dhaka Third Division League as the third placed team. Eventually, the club participated in the 2022–23 Dhaka Third Division League.

== Current squad ==
As of June 2023

Note: Flags indicate national team as defined under FIFA eligibility rules; some limited exceptions apply. Players may hold more than one non-FIFA nationality.

No.	Pos.	Nation	Player
1	GK	BAN	Arpon Kundu
—	GK	BAN	Abu Hanif Talukdar
—	GK	BAN	Anisur Reheman
—	GK	BAN	Avi
2	DF	BAN	Md Shorif Khan
—	DF	BAN	K.M Anil Rahman
4	DF	BAN	Md Al Fahim
—	DF	BAN	Md Jahirul Islam
—	DF	BAN	Shawkat Hossen Jisan
—	DF	BAN	Niloy Gosh
—	DF	BAN	Atiqul Hasan Sowrov
24	DF	BAN	Md Rabbi
28	DF	BAN	Yemties Mollah Samir
34	DF	BAN	Md Zahid Islam

No.	Pos.	Nation	Player
18	MF	BAN	Shariar Ansari
19	MF	BAN	Md Al Kafi
9	MF	BAN	Md Nurunnobi Sarkar
—	MF	BAN	Md Amadul Hossen
—	MF	BAN	Md Mohammed Junyed
—	MF	BAN	Md Abu Huraya Titu
—	MF	BAN	Mehedi Hasan
7	FW	BAN	S.M. Imran Yousuf
—	FW	BAN	Jahangir
—	FW	BAN	Md Nurudin
10	FW	BAN	Md Asanullah Rakib
12	FW	BAN	Md Sompod Hasan
14	FW	BAN	Md Raihan Miah
—	FW	BAN	Md Jakir Mia

== Competitive record ==
Season by season record
Season	Division	League								Federation Cup	Independence Cup	Top league scorer(s)	
Season	Division	P	W	D	L	GF	GA	Pts	Position	Federation Cup	Independence Cup	Player	Goals
2017	Pioneer League	Play-off round								—	—	(Bangladesh) Ratul Hawladar	13
2019–20	Pioneer League	Third Place								—	—		
2022–23	Dhaka Third Division League	TBD								—	—		

Champions	Runners-up	Promoted	Relegated

== Personnel ==
=== Current technical staff ===
As of 19 July 2023.

Position	Name
Head coach	(Bangladesh) Shaurov Alom Shohidul
Assistant coach	(Bangladesh) Md Ayub Ali
Goalkeeping coach	(Bangladesh) Ragib Al Anzum Nirob
Team Leader	(Bangladesh) Md Shahadat Hossain
Team Manager	(Bangladesh) Muhammad Masum
Assistant Team Manager	(Bangladesh) Md Rukunuzzaman Ranu (Bangladesh) Kabir Chowdhury
Physiotherapist	(Bangladesh) Md. Mahabub Alam

== Management ==
=== Board of directors ===
As of 19 July 2023.

Position	Name
Acting President	(Bangladesh) Md Biplob Hossain Mitu
Senior Vice President	(Bangladesh) Md Zahir Uddin
Vice President	(Bangladesh) Major Ashraf Jafri
Vice President	(Bangladesh) Sohel Chowdhury
Vice President	(Bangladesh) Saeed Ahamed
General Secretary	(Bangladesh) Md Shahadat Hossain
Joint Secretary	(Bangladesh) Md Mahbub Ul Alam
Joint Secretary	(Bangladesh) Md Abu Bakkar Siddik
Treasurer	(Bangladesh) Md Faisal Chowdhury Sumon
Office Secretary	(Bangladesh) Mainuddin Tanjib Lal
