= Skylark FC =

Bangladeshi association football club

Skylark FC স্কাইর্লাক ফুটবল ক্লাব
- Full name: Skylark Football Club
- Nickname: The Bombers
- Founded: February 7, 2021; 5 years ago
- President: Shafiqur Rahman Chowdhury
- Head Coach: Md Kamruzzaman Kajol
- League: Dhaka Third Division League
- 2022–23: Dhaka Third Division League, 3rd of 15
- Website: https://skylarkfc.com
colours	colours

Skylark Football Club (Bengali: স্কাইর্লাক ফুটবল ক্লাব) is an association football club from Dhaka, Bangladesh. The club currently plays in Dhaka Third Division Football League, the fifth-tier in the Bangladeshi football league system.

== History ==
Skylark Football Club was established on 7 February 2021. The club took part in the Pioneer League (U-15) in 2021. However, they were unable to secure the top four promotion spots to the Dhaka Third Division League. The club's striker Mehdi Hasan Minar finished as the tournaments top scorer with 15 goals. Eventually, the club was given permission to directly participate in the Third Division League from the 2022–23 season, after meeting the required criteria. Upon confirming its place in the Third Division League, the club named Sofiqur Rahman Chowdhury as its new president. The club finished third in its inaugural season competing in the fifth-tier, falling only a point short of promotion. Following the seasons conclusion, two of the club's players; Ismail Hossain and Abu Sayed were called up to the Bangladesh national under-17 team for the 2023 SAFF U-16 Championship.

== Kits and crest ==
Skylark Football Club is named after a small bird called Skylark. This bird's physical structure, speed and rhythm of flight, and ability to hover and change direction suddenly defeat bombers or fighter planes. The structure of their wings and tails is similar to two or three types of modern warplanes in the world. They work hard and try their best to achieve their goals. This inspired the club to be named Skylark Football Club, and the logo also features the wings and face of a soaring skylark. The color of the club's logo is golden brown, matching the skin color of the skylark bird. And due to the skylark's ability to fly like a bomber, the club was nicknamed The Bombers.

=== Kit suppliers and shirt sponsors ===
Period	Kit manufacturer	Shirt main sponsor
2021–2022	BIRD	Bashundhara Group
2022–2023	BIRD	None

== Current squad ==
The squad for 2022–23 season.

As of August 2022

Note: Flags indicate national team as defined under FIFA eligibility rules; some limited exceptions apply. Players may hold more than one non-FIFA nationality.

No.	Pos.	Nation	Player
1	GK	BAN	Mohammad Zahidul Karim
2	DF	BAN	Sani Das
3	DF	BAN	Emon Babu Jibon
4	DF	BAN	Mong Swe Marma
5	DF	BAN	Arman Hossain
6	MF	BAN	Maimunul Haque Mahin
7	FW	BAN	Rashedul Karim
8	MF	BAN	Ramjan Howlader
9	FW	BAN	Naimul Talukder
10	FW	BAN	Shahadat Hossain
11	FW	BAN	Abir Bhuyan
12	MF	BAN	Sheikh Abrar Jahin
13	FW	BAN	Mahbubur Rahman Mahi
14	FW	BAN	Rashem Hasan Bilto
15	MF	BAN	Paban Morng
17	MF	BAN	Md Sakib
18	MF	BAN	Masum Mia

No.	Pos.	Nation	Player
19	DF	BAN	Ismail Hossen
20	MF	BAN	U Sing Thowai Marma
21	FW	BAN	Sakib Hosen
22	GK	BAN	Mong A Sa Marma
23	GK	BAN	Saiful Islam
24	DF	BAN	Papel Dash
25	MF	BAN	Proshanto Mojumder
26	MF	BAN	Mohammod Siyam Sarker
27	FW	BAN	Abu Sayed
28	DF	BAN	Saiful Islam Asib
29	DF	BAN	Ariful Islam Rabby
30	GK	BAN	Md Riaz
32	DF	BAN	Hlamong Ching Marma
33	FW	BAN	Asad Sardar
34	MF	BAN	Shamim
35	DF	BAN	Seng Graw Tripura

== Personnel ==
=== Current technical staff ===
As of August 2023.

Position	Name
Head coach	(Bangladesh) Md Kamruzzaman Kajol
Team Manager	(Bangladesh) Shoheb Ibne Shams
Goalkeeper Coach	(Bangladesh) Md Kamal Hossain
Physiotherapist	(Bangladesh) Abu Bakar
Team Coordinator	(Bangladesh) Anik Molla
Security Officer	(Bangladesh) Nazmul Hasan Khan

=== Board of directors ===
As of Ausgut 2023.

Position	Name
President	(Bangladesh) Shafiqur Rahman Chowdhury
Vice President	(Bangladesh) FM Riazul Islam
Senior Vice President	(Bangladesh) Abdul Halim Khan
General Secretary	(Bangladesh) Rakibul Islam
Joint General Secretary	(Bangladesh) Shoheb Ibne Shams
Organizing Secretary	(Bangladesh) Saiful Islam
Treasurer	(Bangladesh) Anik Molla
Office Secretary	(Bangladesh) Rakib Hossain
Football Secretary	(Bangladesh) Sayed Abdullah Harun
Sports Secretary	(Bangladesh) Asif Uddin Joy

== Seasons ==
Season	Team statistics											Overall Position	Top goalscorer(s)		Notes
Season	League	Level	Pld	W	L	D	GF	GA	GD	Pts	PPG	Overall Position	Name(s)	Goals	Notes
2021-22	U-15 Pioneer League	6th tier	unknown									Quarter-finals	Mehedi Hasan Minar	unknown	won 'Fair Play Award'
2022-23	U-17 Third Division League	5th tier	14	9	2	3	25	8	+17	29	2.07	3rd of 15	unknown		
Total	–											–			
