= FC Uttar Bongo =

Association football club

Uttar Bongo
- Full name: Football Club Uttar Bongo
- Founded: 2019; 6 years ago
- Ground: Kurigram Stadium; Kurigram, Bangladesh
- Capacity: 10,000
- Sponsor: Deshbandhu Group
- President: Jalal Hoissain Laizu
- Head coach: Md Emdadul Haque Khokon
- League: Dhaka Third Division Football League
- 2022–23: Dhaka Third Division Football League, 4th of 15

Football Club Uttar Bongo (Bengali: এফসি উত্তরবঙ্গ) is a Bangladeshi football club based in Kurigram. It currently plays in Dhaka Third Division Football League, the third tier of football in Dhaka and the fifth-highest tier overall in the Bangladeshi football league system.

Active departments of FC Uttor Bongo
- Football (Men's): Football (Women's)

== History ==
FC Uttar Bongo, established in 2019, is a club which mainly focuses on grassroot football development. They started their journey as a football club by participating in 2019-20 BFF U-15 Pioneer Football League. The U-15 team qualified for Super League in their debut season.

During their debut season, they were runners-up in the Pioneer League, losing to Elias Ahemd Chowdhury SS 2–1. Nonetheless, they were able to earn promotion to the Dhaka Third Division Football League, as one of the four top-finishes in the Pioneer League. The club has also represented Bangladesh at the North Bengal International Gold Cup, a tournament which is held to strengthen the friendship between Bangladesh and India.

== Squad (2023) ==
Note: Flags indicate national team as defined under FIFA eligibility rules; some limited exceptions apply. Players may hold more than one non-FIFA nationality.

No.	Pos.	Nation	Player
1	GK	BAN	Bodruzzaman Rasel
2	DF	BAN	Md Jakariya Akber
3	DF	BAN	Toufik Imran
4	DF	BAN	Sakib Hassan
5	DF	BAN	Arafat Islam Rifat
6	MF	BAN	Moshiur Rahman Sujon
7	MF	BAN	Ripon Islam Rifat
8	MF	BAN	Sumon Chandra Roy
9	MF	BAN	Jahid Hasan
10	FW	BAN	Miranul Islam Milon
11	MF	BAN	Asadujjaman Ashik
12	MF	BAN	Santo Barman
13	FW	BAN	Maruf Hasan Jony
14	FW	BAN	Hemonto Soren
15	MF	BAN	Ratul Para
17	FW	BAN	Raju Ahmed
18	MF	BAN	Rahat Anowar

No.	Pos.	Nation	Player
19	DF	BAN	Md Shahriar
20	DF	BAN	Arikur Rahman Akash
21	DF	BAN	Md Kabirul Mia
23	GK	BAN	Md Murad
25	GK	BAN	Shawon Ahmed Shuvo
26	DF	BAN	Yeaminur Rahman Jim
27	DF	BAN	Rashedul Islam Robi
28	DF	BAN	Sabbir Hossain
29	DF	BAN	Jahidul Islam
30	DF	BAN	Sakib Hasan
31	DF	BAN	Md Mahabur
32	DF	BAN	Rasel Mia
33	FW	BAN	Masum Billah
34	FW	BAN	Jomuo Marma
35	FW	BAN	Lavlu Mia
36	FW	BAN	Ramjan Mia
