= Shantinagar Club =

Shantinagar Sporting Club শান্তিনগর ক্লাব
- Full name: Shantinagar Sporting Club
- Short name: SC
- Founded: 1956; 69 years ago
- President: Muzaffar Hossain Paltu
- League: Dhaka Third Division League
- 2022–23: Third Division League 10th of 15
Home colours	Away colours

Shantinagar Club (Bengali: শান্তিনগর ক্লাব) is a Bangladeshi football club based in the Shantinagar, Dhaka. It currently competes in the Dhaka Third Division League, the fifth-tier of Bangladeshi football.

== Honours ==
- Dhaka Second Division League
  - Champions (3): 1975, 1993, 1996
- Dhaka Third Division League
  - Champions (1): 1974
