= Dhaka Second Division Football League =

- Paragon Daily 2nd Division U18 Football League logo
- Founded: 1948; 78 years ago (recognized) (Note: The Dhaka Football League has been held since at least 1911. However, champions from before the Partition of India, particularly in the First Division, have not yet been officially recognized by the Bangladesh Football Federation (BFF). In addition, a complete list of champions from its current three-tier structure during the British Raj is still incomplete and under research.)
- First season: 1948 (recognized)
- Country: Bangladesh
- Confederation: AFC
- Number of clubs: 15
- Level on pyramid: 2 (1971–1992); 3 (1993–2011); 4 (2012–present)
- Promotion to: Dhaka Senior Division League
- Relegation to: Dhaka Third Division League
- Current champions: BKSP FT
- Most championships: PWD SC; Fire Service AC; Shantinagar Club (3 titles each)
- Broadcasters: Bangladesh Football Federation (on Facebook and YouTube)
- Website: bff.com.bd
- Current: 2025–26 Dhaka Second Division Football League

The Dhaka Second Division Football League (Bengali: ঢাকা দ্বিতীয় বিভাগ ফুটবল লিগ) is the fourth-tier of the Bangladeshi football league system and the second-level of the Dhaka Football League. It officially began in 1948 as the league below the Dhaka First Division Football League when Bangladesh was part of Pakistan.

It served as the second-tier prior the introduction of the Dhaka Premier Division Football League in 1992. In 2012, the league became the fourth-tier of the country's football league system. The two top-finishing teams are automatically promoted to the Dhaka Senior Division Football League. The bottom two teams are automatically relegated to the Dhaka Third Division Football League. The league is run by the Dhaka Metropolitan Football League Committee (DMFLC) under the supervision of the Bangladesh Football Federation (BFF).

== Match-fixing ==
=== 2021–22 ===
On 10 November 2022, the BFF found both BG Press S&RC and Khilgaon FA guilty of match-fixing. Both clubs were also fined Tk5 lakhs each. BG Press had three points deducted, while the club general secretary, Shikdar Moshiur Rahman, head coach Md Delowar Hossain and team manager Md Rafiqul Islam Sarkar, were banned from football activities for six months. Five players of BG Press – Salman Rahman, Mostafizur Rahman, Shahin Alam Pranto, Swadhin Biswas and Mehedi Hasan were also banned for six months, while Md Tanis Mia has been suspended for three months. Khilgaon Football Academy were already relegated from the league, and the club's president Hazi Md Nazrul Islam, general secretary Md Rafiqul Islam, head coach Md Habibur Rahman and team manager Faruk Ahmed were banned from taking part in football activities for six months.

== Structure ==
As of February 2025.

Level	Division	Class
1	Bangladesh Football League; 10 clubs (substituted off) teams relegated	Professional
2	Bangladesh Championship League; 10 clubs (substituted on) 2 teams promoted (substituted off) 2 teams relegated	Professional
3	Dhaka Senior Division League; 18 clubs (substituted on) 4 teams promoted (substituted off) 2 teams relegated	Semi-professional
4	Dhaka Second Division League; 15 clubs (substituted on) 2 teams promoted (substituted off) 2 teams relegated	Semi-professional
5	Dhaka Third Division League; 15 clubs (substituted on) 2 teams promoted (substituted off) 2 teams relegated	Semi-professional
6	Bangladesh Pioneer League; Unlimited number of clubs (substituted on) 4 teams promoted No relegation	Amateur

== Champions ==
Further Information: List of Dhaka Football League champions

- The following is a list of Second Division champions following the Partition of India.

No.	Season	Champion(s)
1	1948	EP Gymkhana
2	1949	Tejgaon Friends Union
3	1950	Fire Service
4	1951	EBG Press
5	1952	EP Rifles
6	1953	East End
7	1954	Signal Wings
8	1955	Central Printing Press
9	1956	DC Mills
10	1957	PWD
11	1958	EB Railway
12	1959	Kamal
13	1960	Adamjee
14	1961	PE Railway
15	1962	DC Jail
16	1963	Fire Service
17	1964	Rahmatganj
18	1965	EPIDC
19	1966	Railway Pioneers
20	1967	East End
21	1968	Dilkusha
22	1969	EPWAPDA
23	1970	Iqbal
–	1971	not held
–	1972	abandoned

No.	Season	Champion(s)
24	1973	BRTC
25	1974	Brothers Union
26	1975	Shantinagar
27	1976	Sadharan Bima
28	1977	Fire Service
29	1978	Dhanmondi
30	1979	Arambagh
31	1980	Farashganj
–	1981	not held
32	1982	BRTC
33	1983	Muktijoddha
34	1984	PWD
35	1985	Mirpur Chalantika
36	1986	Adamjee
37	1987	Fakirerpool
38	1988–89	BJMC
39	1989–90	Eskaton
–	1991	not held
40	1991–92	Bangladesh Boys
41	1993	Shantinagar
42	1994	Police
43	1995	Mirpur Chalantika
44	1996	Shantinagar
45	1997–98	Prantik
–	1998	not held

No.	Season	Champion(s)
46	1999	PWD
–	2000	not held
47	2001	Sheikh Russel
48	2002	Mohakhali Ekadosh
49	2003–04	Purbachal Parishad
50	2004–05	Jatrabari KC
–	2005–06	not held
–	2006–07	not held
51	2007–08	Uttar Baridhara
–	2008	not held
–	2009	not held
–	2010	not held
–	2011	not held
52	2012	Basabo
53	2013	Police
–	2014	not held
–	2015	not held
–	2016	not held
54	2017	Nobabpur
55	2018–19	Somaj Kallyan
–	2019–20	not held
–	2020–21	not held
56	2021–22	Saif SC Youth
57	2022–23	Jatrabari JS
–	2023–24	not held

No.	Season	Champion(s)
–	2024–25	not held
58	2025–26	BKSP FT

== Promotion timeline ==
Promotion history (1948–present)
No.	Season	Winner	Runner-up	Third place	Fourth place	Notes/References
Second level
1	1948	EP Gymkhana	None			
2	1949	Tejgaon Friends Union	Dhaka Police	None		
3	1950	Fire Service	Azad	None		
4	1951	EBG Press	None	None		
5	1952	EP Rifles	None	None		
6	1953	East End	Ispahani	None		
7	1954	Signal Wings	None			
8	1955	Central Printing Press	None			
9	1956	DC Mills	None			
10	1957	PWD	None			
11	1958	~~EB Railway~~	Tejgaon Sporting Club	None		(Note: Tejgaon SC were promoted as East Bengal Railway were ineligible to participate in the First Division.)
12	1959	Kamal	None			
13	1960	Adamjee	None			
14	1961	PE Railway	None			
15	1962	DC Jail	None			
16	1963	Fire Service	None			
17	1964	Rahmatganj	None			
18	1965	EPIDC	None			
19	1966	Railway Pioneers	None			
20	1967	East End	None			
21	1968	Dilkusha	None			
22	1969	EPWAPDA	None			
23	1970	Iqbal	None			(Note: Iqbal SC, reintroduced as Abahani Krira Chakra participated in the 1973 Dhaka First Division Football League.)
	1971	Not held				Not held due to the Bangladesh Liberation War
	1972	Abandoned				
24	1973	BRTC	None			
25	1974	Brothers Union	None			
26	1975	Shantinagar Club	None			
27	1976	Sadharan Bima	None			
28	1977	Fire Service	None			
29	1978	Dhanmondi	None			
30	1979	Arambagh	None			
31	1980	Farashganj	None			
	1981	Not held				
32	1982	BRTC	None			
33	1983	Muktijoddha	None			
34	1984	PWD	None			
35	1985	Mirpur Chalantika	None			
36	1986	Adamjee	None			
37	1987	Fakirerpool YMC	Agrani Bank	None		
38	1988–89	BJMC	Wari Club	None		
39	1989–90	Eskaton	Police	None		
	1991	Not held				
40	1991–92	Bangladesh Boys	East End	None		(Note: Promoted to the Dhaka First Division Football League, which turned into the second-tier from 1993.)
Third level
41	1993	Shantinagar	The Muslim Institute	None		(Note: The Second Division began operating as the third-tier. Officially referred to as the Sonali Bank Second Division Football League 1993, the season began on 27 October 1993 and ended in January 1994.)
42	1994	Police	Badda	None		(Note: The 1994 Second Division Football League was held from 18 December 1994 to March 1995.)
44	1995	Mirpur Chalantika	BRTC	None		(Note: Officially referred to as the Sonali Bank Second Division Football League 1995, the season began in 1995 and ended on 12 February 1996.)
44	1996	Shantinagar	Dhaka Wanderers	None		(Note: The season was held from 14 March to 15 April 1997)
45	1997–98	Prantik	The Muslim Institute	None		
	1998	Not held				
46	1999	PWD	Sadharan Bima	None		
	2000	Not held				
47	2001	Sheikh Russel	East End	Dhaka Wanderers	None	(Note: The season began from 20 January 2002.)
48	2002	Mohakhali Ekadosh	Dipali	None		(Note: The season began from June and concluded in August 2003.)
49	2003–04	Purbachal Parishad	City Club	None		
50	2004–05	Jatrabari KC	Sunrise	None		(Note: Officially referred to as the Rahman Foundation Second Division Football League 2004/05, the season concluded in 2006.)
	2005–06	Not held				
	2006–07	Not held				
51	2007–08	Uttar Baridhara	T&T Club	None		(Note: Promoted teams played in the Dhaka Senior Division Football League, the new third-tier.)
	2008	Not held				
	2009	Not held				
	2010	Not held				
	2011	Not held				
Fourth level
52	2012	Basabo	Friends SWO	Bangladesh Boys	Swadhinata	(Note: The Second Division began operating as the fourth-tier. For the first time four teams were promoted from the league.)
53	2013	Police	PWD	Kawran Bazar	Sadharan Bima	(Note: Officially referred to as the Cool Second Division League 2013, the season began on 21 December 2013 and concluded on 17 February 2014. The winners, Police AC, were directly promoted to the 2014–15 Bangladesh Championship League after meeting the cirterion required to enter the professional football league.)
	2014	Not held				
	2015	Not held				
	2016	Not held				
54	2017	Nobabpur	Kashaituly	None		
55	2018–19	Somaj Kallyan	Dilkusha	Not held		
	2019–20	Not held				
	2020–21	Cancelled due to COVID-19 pandemic in Bangladesh				
56	2021–22	Saif SC Youth	Siddique Bazar	None		
57	2022–23	Jatrabari JS	Arambagh FA	None		
	2023–24	Not held				
	2024–25	Not held				
58	2025–26	BKSP FT	Purbachal Parishad	None		

== Top scorers ==
Season	Player	Club	Goals	Ref.
1968	Kazi Salahuddin	Dilkusha	14	
1974	Mohammed Mohsin	Brothers Union	22	
1982	Monir Hossain Manu	BRTC	14	
1983	Shahinur Kabir Shimul	Muktijoddha	16	
1984	Mostafizur Rahman Mostak	PWD	17	
1986	Mohammed Noman	Rayer Bazar	10	
1987	Mizanur Rahman Mizan	Fakirerpool	7	
1988–89	Tushar Barua	BJMC	9	
2001–02	Bashir Ahmed	Mohakhali Ekadosh	15	
2021–22	Saifullah Sardar	Jabid Ahsan Sohel	14	
2022–23	Aryan Sikder	Jatrabari JS	11	
