= Football in Bangladesh =

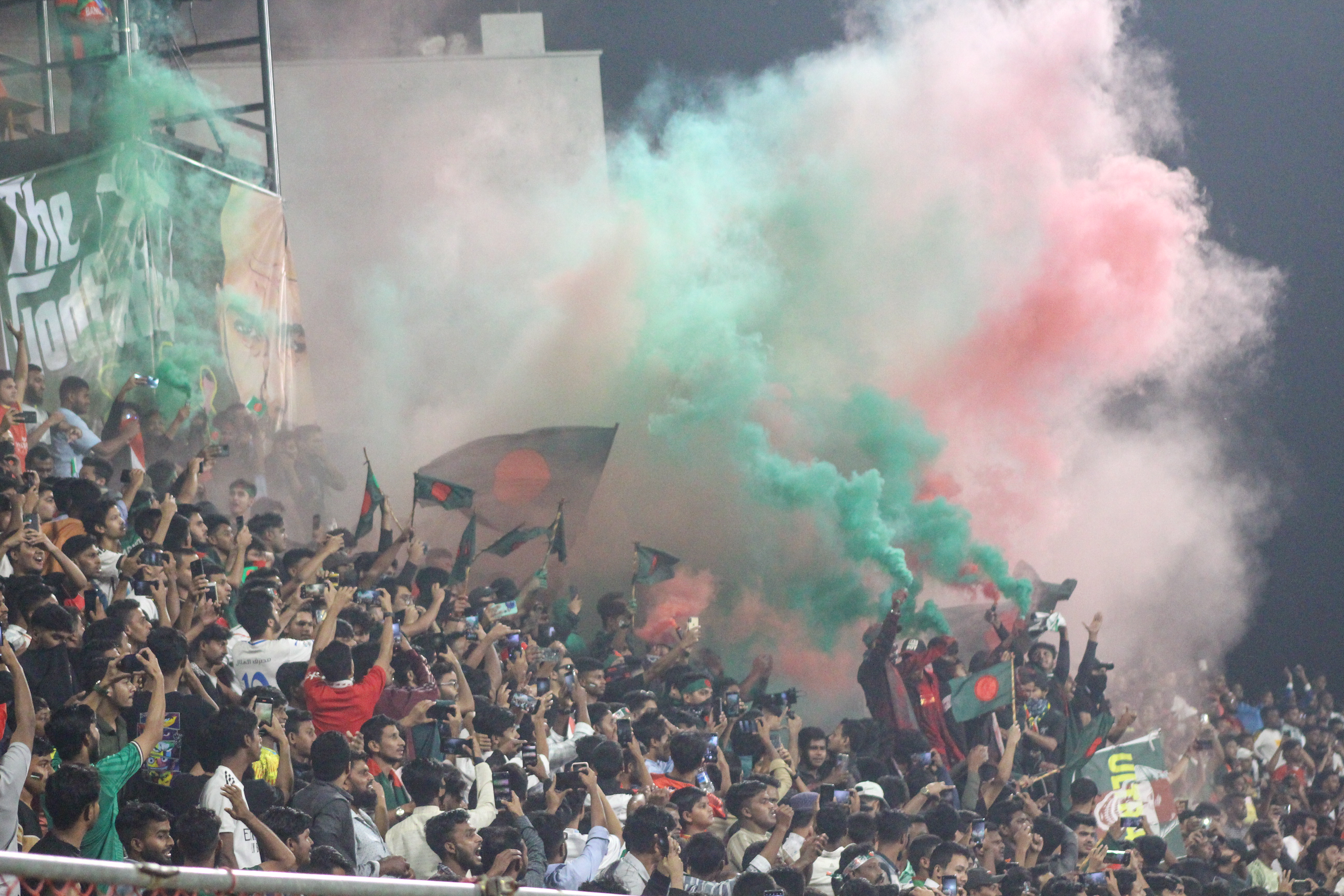
- Bangladesh football fans during the 2026 FIFA World Cup qualification match between Bangladesh and Lebanon in 2023
- Country: Bangladesh
- Governing body: Bangladesh Football Federation
- National team: Men's national team

National competitions
- FIFA World Cup; AFC Asian Cup; AFC Challenge Cup (defunct); SAFF Championship; South Asian Games; President's Gold Cup (defunct); AFC U-20 Asian Cup; SAFF U-20 Championship; AFC U-17 Asian Cup; SAFF U-17 Championship

Club competitions
- List: League: Bangladesh Football League Bangladesh Championship League Senior Division League Second Division League Third Division League Bangladesh Pioneer League; Cups: Challenge Cup Federation Cup Independence Cup DMFA Cup (defunct)

International competitions
- AFC Challenge League; AFC Cup (defunct); AFC Champions League (defunct); Aga Khan Gold Cup (defunct)

Football is one of the most popular sports in Bangladesh, introduced during the late 19th century under British rule, with Dhaka playing a central role in its development. The Bangladesh Football Federation was founded in 1972, a year after the country’s independence. The national team made its official debut at the 1973 Merdeka Cup in Malaysia. Domestic football resumed the same year with the Dhaka First Division League, which had existed since before the partition of India and attracted internationally renowned players like Nasser Hejazi and Emeka Ezeugo. Professional football was introduced in 2007 with the Bangladesh Football League, known formerly as the B.League.

== History ==
=== Birth of Bengali football (1895–1946) ===
==== Early years ====
Football in Bengal was introduced during the British Raj and gained popularity in the 19th century through Western-style educational institutions in Calcutta and Dhaka. Players from Eastern Bengal, particularly from regions such as Dhaka, Mymensingh, and Khulna, soon began featuring in matches at the Calcutta Maidan. Although the Calcutta League, established in 1898, was largely dominated by players from West Bengal, several East Bengali footballers made significant contributions, including Tejas Shome from Kishoreganj and Shibdas Bhaduri from Barisal. A landmark moment came in 1911, when Mohun Bagan AC won the IFA Shield with eight players from East Bengal in the squad. The influence of East Bengal continued to grow with the founding of East Bengal in 1920, which began competing in the Calcutta First Division in 1925. This was followed by the entry of Calcutta Mohammedan into the First Division in 1933, led by Habibullah Bahar Chowdhury from Feni.

In the late 19th century, several football clubs were established in Dhaka, and this club culture gradually spread to other parts of East Bengal, including Chittagong, Mymensingh, and Tajhat. The first football club in East Bengal, Wari Club, was founded in 1898 by Rai Bahadur Surendranath Rai. The club practiced at the Paltan Maidan in Dhaka and achieved some success in the IFA Shield by sending teams to various districts of West Bengal. In 1903, Victoria Sporting Club was established by five prominent zamindar families of Dhaka, named in honor of Queen Victoria. Beyond Dhaka, clubs like Tajhat Football Club in Rangpur, founded in 1905, and Mymensingh Mohammedan, reportedly founded in the same year as Wari in 1898, contributed to the growing football culture.

The Dhaka Sports Association (DSA) was established in 1895 as the apex body controlling sports in Dhaka. The DSA had started the Dhaka Football League by at least 1911. Notable teams participating in the First Division included Dacca Farm (champions in 1936 and 1937), Wari Club, Victoria SC, Dhaka Hall, Medical College, and Jagannath College. The introduction of a Second Division and Third Division allowed clubs like Dhaka Mohammedan and Dhaka Wanderers, both supported by members of the Nawab of Dhaka, to make their mark in Dhaka football. In addition to football in the capital, the Kumudini Cup was introduced in Rajshahi, while the Ronaldshay Shield was played in both Dhaka and Chittagong starting in the 1920s. Inter-school and college football tournaments also gained popularity during that time.

Mymensingh also played a huge role in the development of the game in East Bengal, with the simultaneous introduction of the Surya Kanta Shield and the Lila Devi Shield in 1914, both initially sponsored by the Muktagacha dynasty. The Lila Devi Shield, famously known as a 4-foot-8-inch trophy, was an event particularly popular among school-goers, while the Surya Kanta Shield saw clubs from Dhaka, Calcutta, and Karachi participate, with Mohun Bagan notably winning the title in 1920. The Coutts Cup, held in Dhaka in the 1910s, was another popular inter-school football tournament for boys whose height did not exceed 4 feet 9 inches.

==== Growth and affiliation with AIFF ====
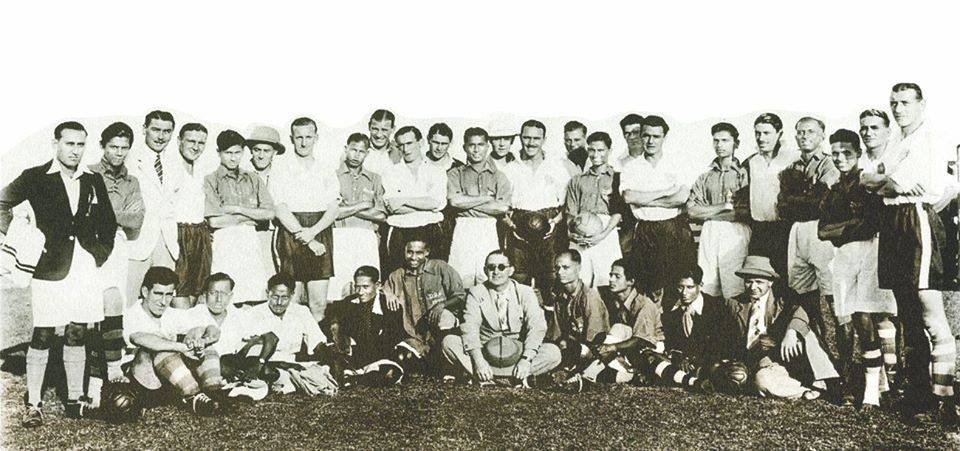
Islington Corinthians and DSA XI players, 1937

In the early 20th century, the Dhaka First Division League gained nationwide attention, with clubs such as Victoria SC, Wari Club, and Dacca Farm at the forefront of its growth. Notably, the 1927 season featured the"Football Magician", Syed Abdus Samad, representing Victoria SC, further highlighting the league's development. In 1929, Dhaka University defeated Calcutta University in the final of the inaugural Sir Sultan Ahmed Shield Inter-University Football Tournament, held in Patna, Bihar. The match was decided by a lone goal scored by Romizuddin Ahmed.

In November 1937, Islington Corinthians from Britain visited Dhaka as part of their tour of India. On 21 November, they played against the DSA XI and suffered the tour's first defeat. The DSA team included players from Dhaka Hall and Wari Club, and the game's only goal was scored by Pakhi Sen, from Mymensingh. While departing Dhaka, the opposition admitted to their defeat, stating, "I heard a lot about the Bengal tiger! This time I saw it!"

The Corinthians also played exhibition matches in Mymensingh, Kishoreganj, Comilla, Chittagong and Rajshahi, winning at all frontiers, one after another. The match at Chittagong had an official record attendance, with 77,000 people watching the game.

Following the foundation of the All India Football Federation in 1937, the DSA was one of the proposers of a national interstate football championship in India. The football competition was introduced on 27 January 1941 at the Bombay General Assembly, as the Santosh Trophy. The Dacca football team which became the provincial member under Dacca Sporting Association in 1938, participated in the tournament in 1944–45 and 1945–46 editions without finding much success.

=== Post-partition football (1947–1970) ===
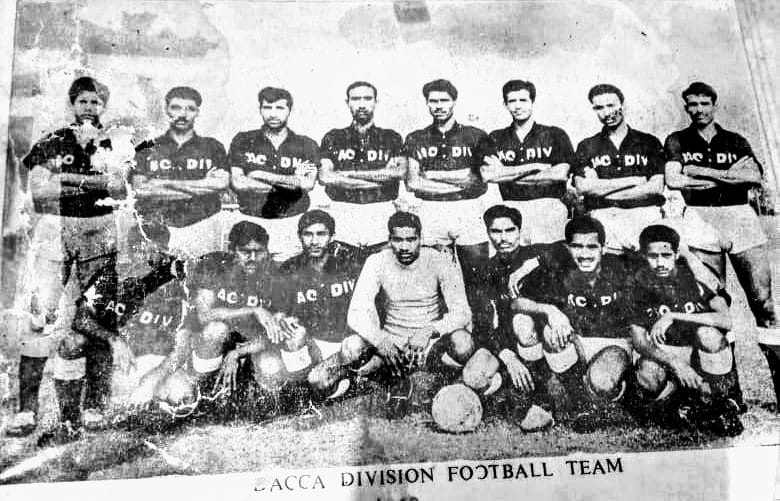
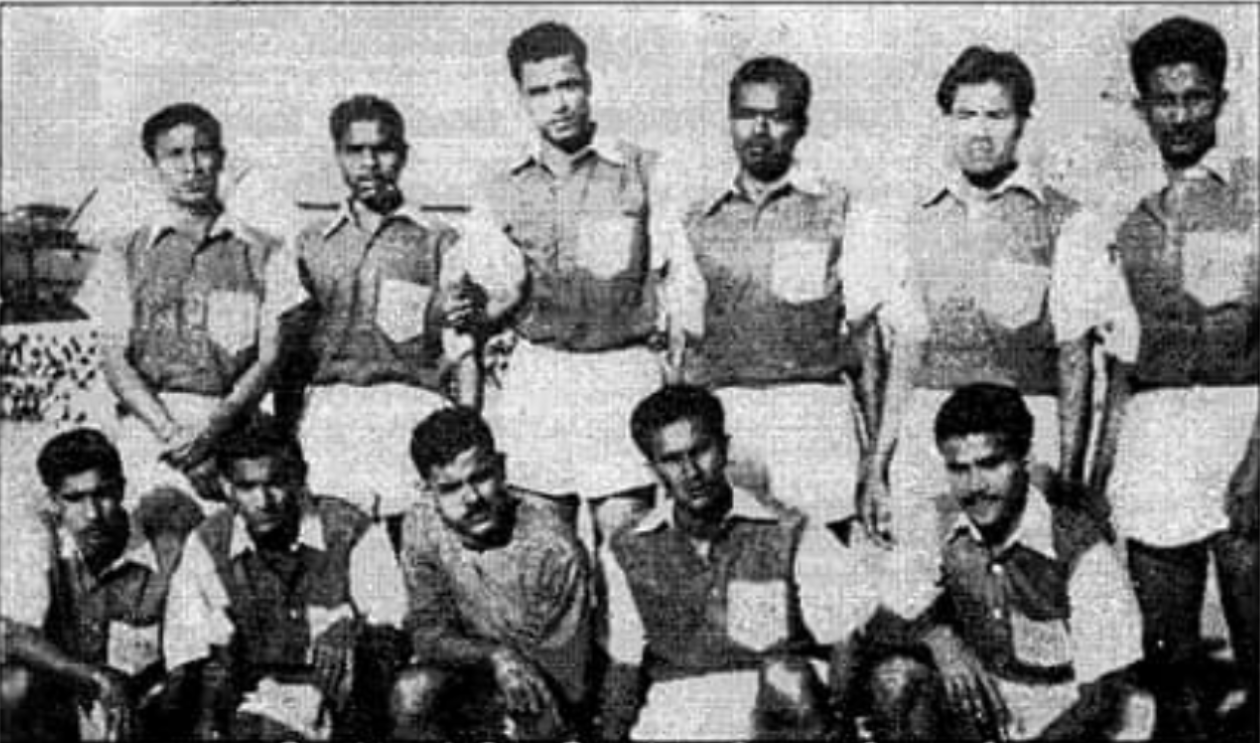
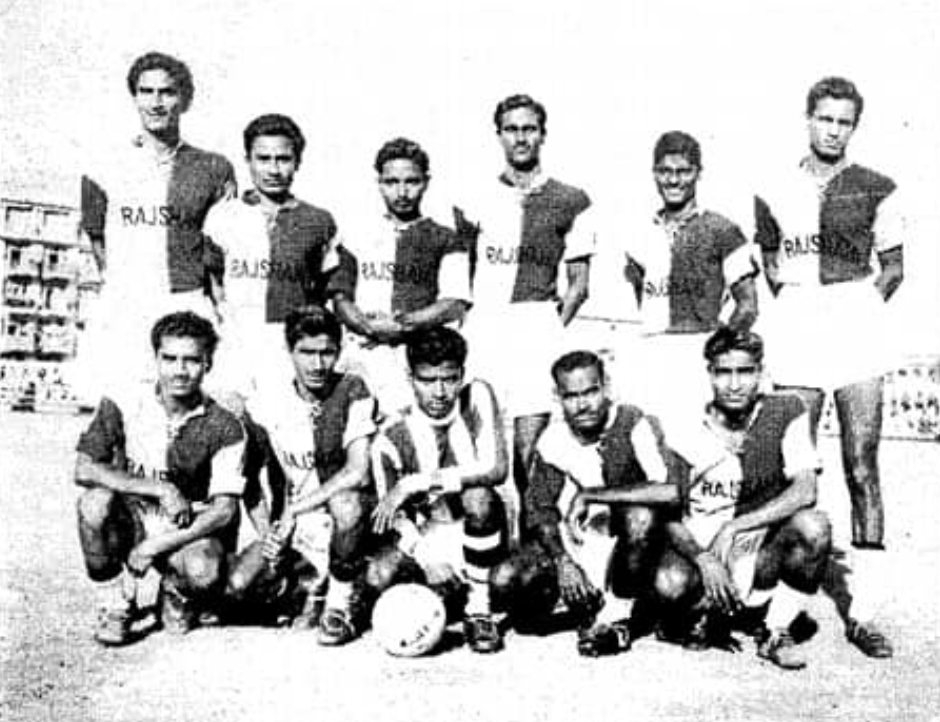
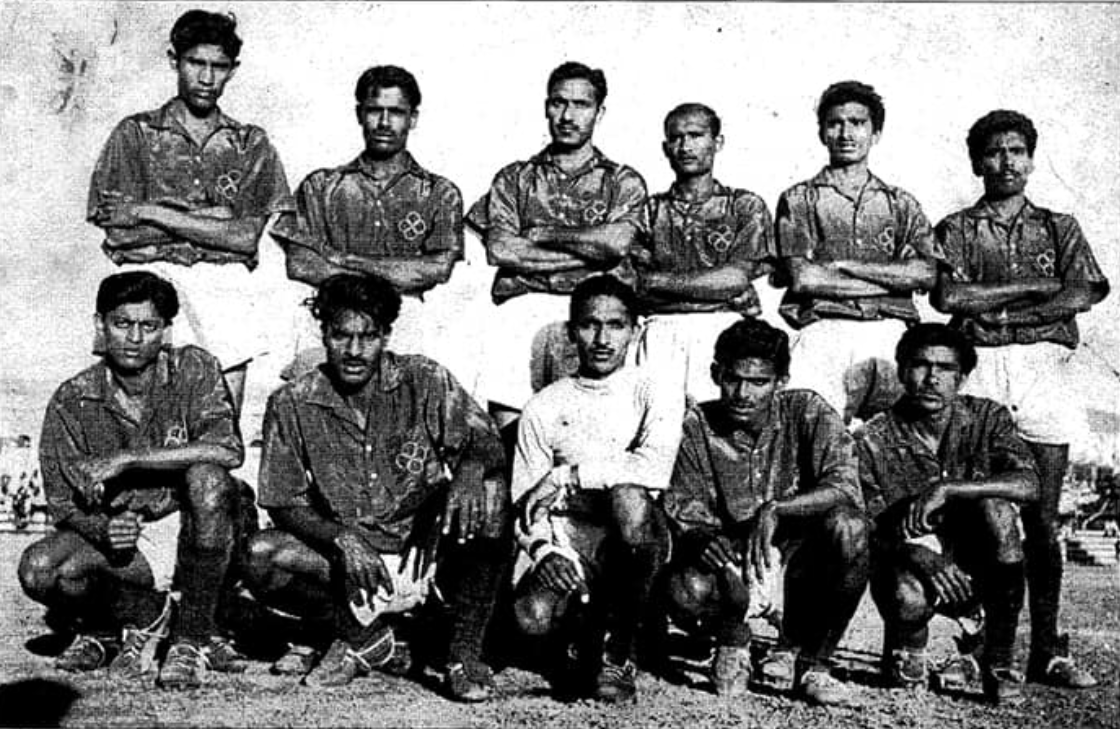
East Pakistani Divisional teams at the National Football Championship. Clockwise from top right: Dhaka Division team, Chittagong Division team, Khulna Division team and Rajshahi Division team.

Following the Partition of India in 1947, East Bengal became part of Pakistan and began competing in the annual National Football Championship, which later became the country's highest-level football competition. In 1951, the East Pakistan Sports Federation (EPSF) merged with the East Pakistan Sports Association (EPSA), formerly known as the DSA, to become the province's primary sports body, with Habibullah Bahar Chowdhury as its president. The province hosted the National Championship five times. In 1957 and 1959, the East Pakistan team finished as runners-up, and in 1960, East Pakistan secured its maiden title in Karachi. After this success, the EPSF introduced divisional teams from Dacca, Chittagong, Khulna, and Rajshahi, with Dacca winning back-to-back titles in 1961–62 and 1962, while Chittagong triumphed in 1969–70. The EPSF also fielded strong Combined University teams, which also participated in the National Youth Football Championship.

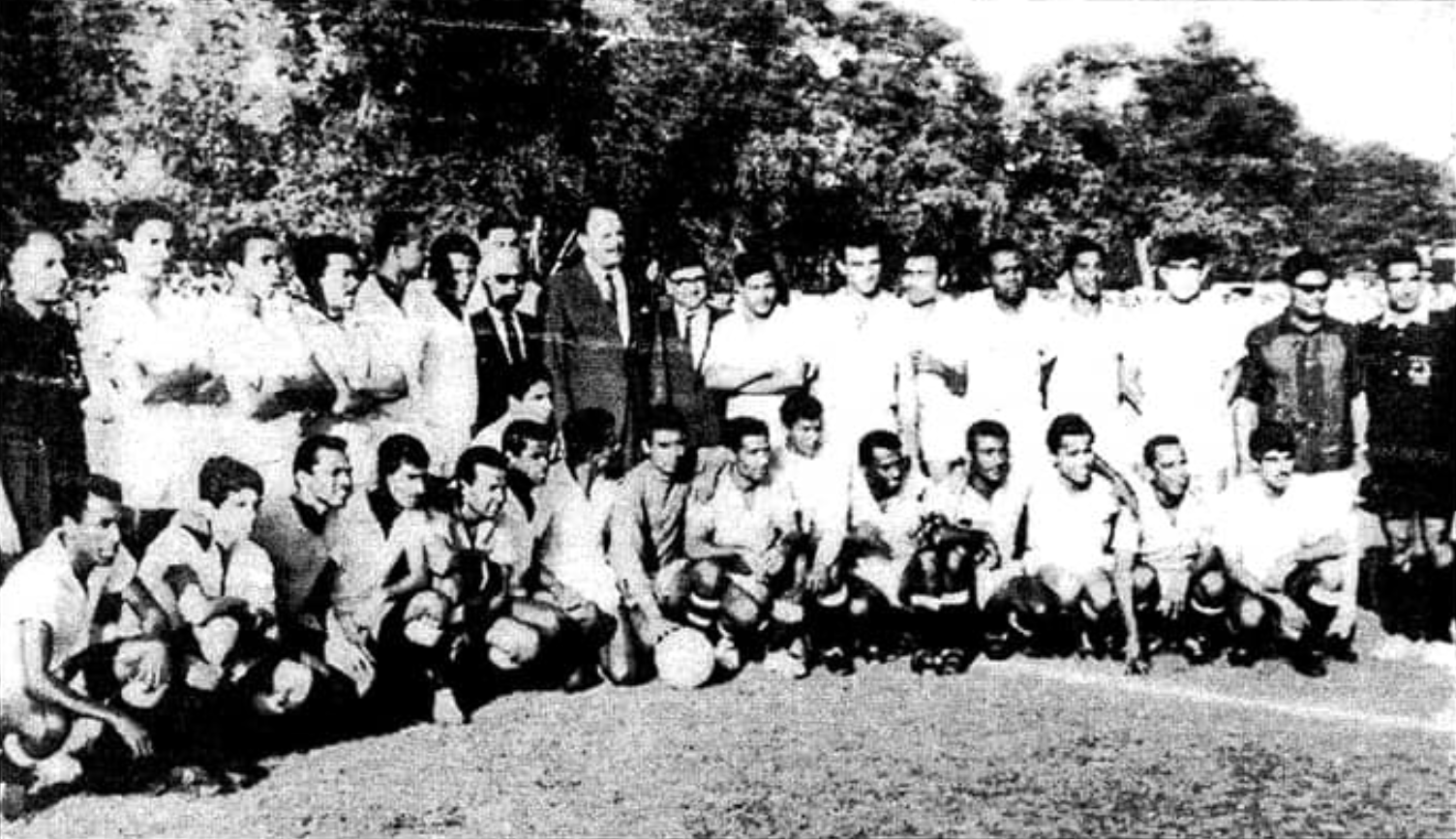
Players of the two most successful clubs in East Pakistan prior to independence, Dhaka Wanderers and Dhaka Mohammedan in 1966.

Football leagues in Dacca, Chittagong, and Khulna were the most active in East Pakistan, shaping teams for the National Championship. In Dacca, the First and Second Division leagues resumed a year after Partition, followed by the Third Division. Victoria SC won the inaugural First Division season, but Dhaka Wanderers dominated the 1950s. The league also attracted top players from other East Pakistani districts such as Chittagong, Rajshahi and Khulna. The Independence Day Football Tournament was the province's top domestic cup, with its final played annually on August 14. In 1958, Prince Shah Karim Al Hussaini (Aga Khan IV), with the EPSF and AFC, launched the Aga Khan Gold Cup as an unofficial AFC Champions League, bringing top Asian clubs to Dacca. Dhaka Mohammedan won it in 1959 and soon dominated domestic football. The 1960s saw clubs like Victoria SC and Dhaka Mohammedan recruit West Pakistani players, especially of Makrani descent.

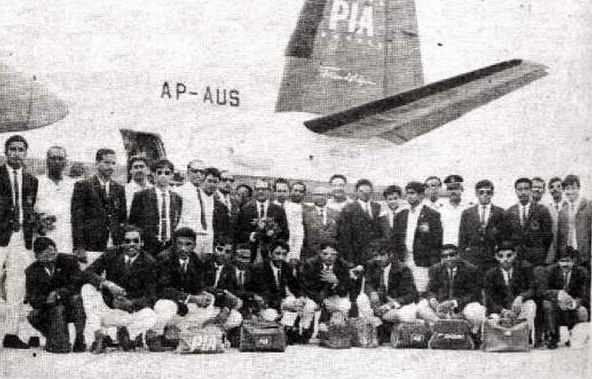
East Pakistan team which won the 1970 King Mahendra Cup in Nepal.

With Dacca's football scene dominated by West Pakistani players, the EPSF introduced regulations limiting clubs to a maximum of five non-Bengali players per league game. Clubs like Azad SC, Rahmatganj MFS, and Police AC prioritized Bengali players, yet over the two decades following Pakistan's creation, only 24 Bengalis represented the national team. The highlight came at the 1958 Tokyo Asian Games, where Pakistan was captained by Nabi Chowdhury from Feni, and featured five other Bengali players. Besides the National Championship, the East Pakistan football team also played unofficial international matches, including a heavy 1–11 defeat to China on 24 January 1963 in Dacca. In 1961, they faced Burma in two warm-up matches in Dacca and Chittagong, suffering similarly lopsided losses. On 9 June 1963, the East Pakistan Sports Federation XI played an exhibition match against Bundesliga club Fortuna Düsseldorf, who had an unplanned stay in Pakistan due to aircraft issues. The match at Dhaka Stadium ended in a 1–4 defeat for the hosts. The team won their maiden international trophy in 1970, the King Mahendra Cup in Kathmandu, Nepal.

=== Post-independence era (1971–2006) ===
==== Peak of popularity ====
During the Bangladesh Liberation War of 1971, the Shadhin Bangla football team was formed by the Bangladesh Sports Association under the Provisional Government, playing 16 friendly matches across India and raising Tk 16.33 lakh for the war effort. After Bangladesh's victory on 16 December 1971, the first football match in independent Bangladesh took place on 13 February 1972 at Dhaka Stadium, where President's XI defeated Bangladesh XI 2–0. Mohun Bagan became the first foreign club to visit, playing two exhibition matches on 11 and 13 May 1972, defeating Mohammedan 1–0 but losing 1–0 to Dhaka XI before 35,000 spectators. The Bangladesh Football Federation (BFF) was founded on 15 July 1972 by former Minister Md.Yousuf Ali, affiliating with AFC in 1973 and FIFA in 1976. Before affiliation, Dhaka XI toured India from August to November 1972, finishing runners-up in the Bordoloi Trophy, and played two home exhibition matches against East Bengal in November. Eventually, the Bangladesh national team made their international debut at the 1973 Merdeka Tournament in Malaysia.

On 5 November 1973, Dinamo Minsk from the Soviet Union arrived in Dhaka for four exhibition matches. They faced Dhaka XI on 6 November, followed by dominant wins against Comilla XI (7–0 on 9 November), Jessore XI (9–0 on 11 November), and Dhaka Metropolis XI (3–0 on 14 November). Although domestic football resumed in 1972, both the First Division and Second Division, were abandoned after a few games. In 1972, Mohammedan defeated East End Club in the Independence Cup final, notably this was the first football tournament in independent Bangladesh. BJMC won the First Division in 1973, and would dominate domestic football that decade alongside Mohammedan and the newly formed Abahani Krira Chakra, the latter being formed and funded by Sheikh Kamal. Since their first clash in 1973, the Dhaka derby between Abahani and Mohammedan grew into the biggest fixture in domestic football, fueled by their massive nationwide fan bases and violent clashes.

The Aga Khan Gold Cup resumed in 1976 but never regained its past success. In its final edition in 1981–82, Brothers Union won jointly with Bangkok Bank, becoming the only local club to claim the title post-independence. In 1985, the AFC relaunched the Asian Club Championship, with Abahani debuting as 1984 league champions, finishing Central Asian Zone runners-up behind East Bengal. Despite Abahani's league hat-trick (1983–85), the era is considered Mohammedan's golden years, as they also secured a hat-trick of league titles (1986, 1987, 1988–89) and remained unbeaten in 76 league games from 8 September 1985 to 15 March 1990. Under coach Nasser Hejazi, they achieved continental success, reaching the 1988–89 Asian Club Championship semi-final group round, while defeating Iran's Persepolis and North Korea's April 25, and also advancing to the quarter-final group stage in both the 1990–91 and 1991 editions. From 1980, the Federation Cup would become the main domestic cup tournament of Bangladesh. The Pioneer League was introduced in 1981, as fourth-tier of domestic football.

Bangladesh made their major tournament debut at the 1978 Bangokok Asian Games but failed to secure a win. That same year, Dhaka hosted the 1978 AFC Youth Championship, followed by the 1980 AFC Asian Cup qualifiers, where Bangladesh advanced as group runners-up. However, they lost all four matches in the main tournament in Kuwait. The President's Gold Cup began in 1981, featuring both national teams and clubs. Bangladesh earned their first Asian Games win in 1982, defeating Malaysia 2–1. Their World Cup qualification debut came in the 1986 FIFA World Cup qualifiers, finishing bottom with two wins and four losses. Despite four runner-up finishes in the South Asian Games (1984–1995), a title remained elusive. The team would also finish runners-up at the 1985 Quaid-e-Azam International Tournament in Pakistan. In 1989, Bangladesh won the 1989 President's Gold Cup, however, aside from India, the other participating teams were clubs and University teams.

==== Gradual downfall ====
In 1990, the Dhaka First Division League was not held because of political unrest. The BFF organized the BTC Club Cup to aid victims of the 1991 cyclone, featuring India's Mohun Bagan, East Bengal, and Kolkata Mohammedan. Local club Abahani won the tournament. Teams in the Calcutta First Division League recruited several Bangladeshi players, including Monem Munna, who became a fan favorite at East Bengal. In 1993, the BFF restructured the country's league system by introducing the Dhaka Premier Division League, with the First Division serving as the second-tier, expanding Bangladesh's league system to five tiers. That same year, Mohammedan, Abahani, and Brothers Union agreed not to sign players from one another, which reduced player demand and, in turn, their salaries.

Aside from the league in Dhaka, the Sher-e-Bangla Cup allowed district teams and government institutions to participate, however, most teams were dominated by players from the top division of Dhaka, as district football league's were also held irregularly, leading to the centralization of football. The lack of quality players also affected the national team, with Bangladesh even failing to advanced past the group-stages of the 1993 South Asian Games held on home soil. Despite these setbacks, domestic football remained a major focus. In 1991, Dhaka Abahani made history by signing Monem Munna for Tk 20 lakh, setting a South Asian transfer record at the time. However, it wasn't until 1995 that Bangladesh achieved its first international success, winning the 4-nation Tiger Trophy under Munna's captaincy with a 2–1 victory over hosts Myanmar in the final. Eventually, Bangladesh, led by Jewel Rana, secured gold at the 1999 South Asian Games, after four runners-up finishes.

In 2000, the BFF struck a sponsorship deal with Nitol Niloy Group, worth Tk 40 lakh deal, and initiated the National Football League in order to decentralise domestic football from Dhaka. The league ran for five seasons, with district champions from all eight division including services team eligible to participate. Although the Dhaka Premier Division League remained Bangladesh's top-tier, its winners lost the right to participate in the Asian Club Championship following its re-introduction after the 2001–02 edition. With the introduction of the AFC Cup in 2004, the AFC competition spot previously awarded to the Dhaka Premier League champions was reassigned to the winners of the National League and Federation Cup. Additionally, as cricket grew in popularity, football, once Bangladesh's leading sport, suffered a decade of mismanagement, leading to its decline in popularity. The domestic football league in Dhaka, which regularly attracted more than 20,000 spectators per game in the two decades following independence, struggled to draw even 5,000 spectators following the turn of the century, leading to a decline in ticket sales.

On 26 November 2001, SA Sultan was appointed BFF president and replaced its elected body with an ad-hoc committee, leading to a FIFA ban on 10 January 2002, which was lifted on 11 February after reinstating the original committee. In 2003, the national team achieved significant success by winning the 2003 SAFF Gold Cup on home soil. However, the BFF failed to capitalize on this, as their proposal to make the National League a two-tiered competition, including the top ten Dhaka Premier Division League clubs, did not materialize. Additionally, the Dhaka Premier Division was not held in 2006, leaving Bangladesh without domestic football for nearly a year. The national team crashed out in the quarter-finals of the 2006 AFC Challenge Cup, also held at home, and failed to earn a single point in the 2007 AFC Asian Cup qualifiers.

=== Professionalization (2007–present) ===
In 2007, the B.League (now Bangladesh Football League) was introduced as Bangladesh’s first professional national football league, marking the beginning of professional football in the country. The following year, former national captain Kazi Salahuddin was appointed president of the BFF. In his first year in office, he secured a landmark three-year sponsorship deal worth Taka 16.5 crore (approximately US$2,285,714) with Citycell, granting the multinational mobile operator title sponsorship rights for both the professional league and the Federation Cup. In 2009, the BFF launched the Citycell Bangladesh Super Cup, with the winners receiving prize money of Tk 1 crore (approximately $150,000), which was reportedly a record in Asia at the time. In 2008, the District Football Associations (DFAs) were formed under FIFA guidelines to strengthen the domestic pipeline. The BFF also resumed the Dhaka Metropolis School Football Tournament in 2010, following a four-year hiatus. In 2012, the Bangladesh Championship League was introduced as the professional second-tier national football league.

6 September 2011, marked a huge moment for football in Bangladesh, as the National Stadium in Dhaka hosted an international friendly match between Argentina and Nigeria. The game notably featured Lionel Messi, Sergio Agüero, Javier Mascherano and Mikel John Obi among the other star players of both nations. Argentina won 3–1 with goals from then-Real Madrid teammates Gonzalo Higuaín and Ángel Di María, and an own goal from Nigeria's Elderson Echiéjilé with Chinedu Obasi scoring Nigeria's lone goal. Bangladeshi referee Tayeb Shamsuzzaman officiated the game, which drew 25,000 spectators despite ticket prices starting at US$100.

In 2007, Bangladeshi clubs were relegated to the AFC President's Cup after failing to send a team to the 2006 AFC Cup due to the absence of a domestic league that season. They remained in AFC's third-tier due to poor performances until the tournament was disbanded in 2014. Although the professional league was introduced primarily to decentralize football in the country, it mainly saw Dhaka-based teams participate, while clubs from other districts struggled to maintain long-term competitiveness. Most clubs fail to meet AFC criteria and rely on local donations, leaving them unable to provide players with proper training facilities or establish their own youth academies. Additionally, the lack of professional contracts allow players to often receive multiple payments from clubs during transfers. The league also experiences regular withdrawals of clubs, as the professional league committee has failed to establish a permanent season calendar and a fixed number of participants.

==== Challenges and setbacks ====
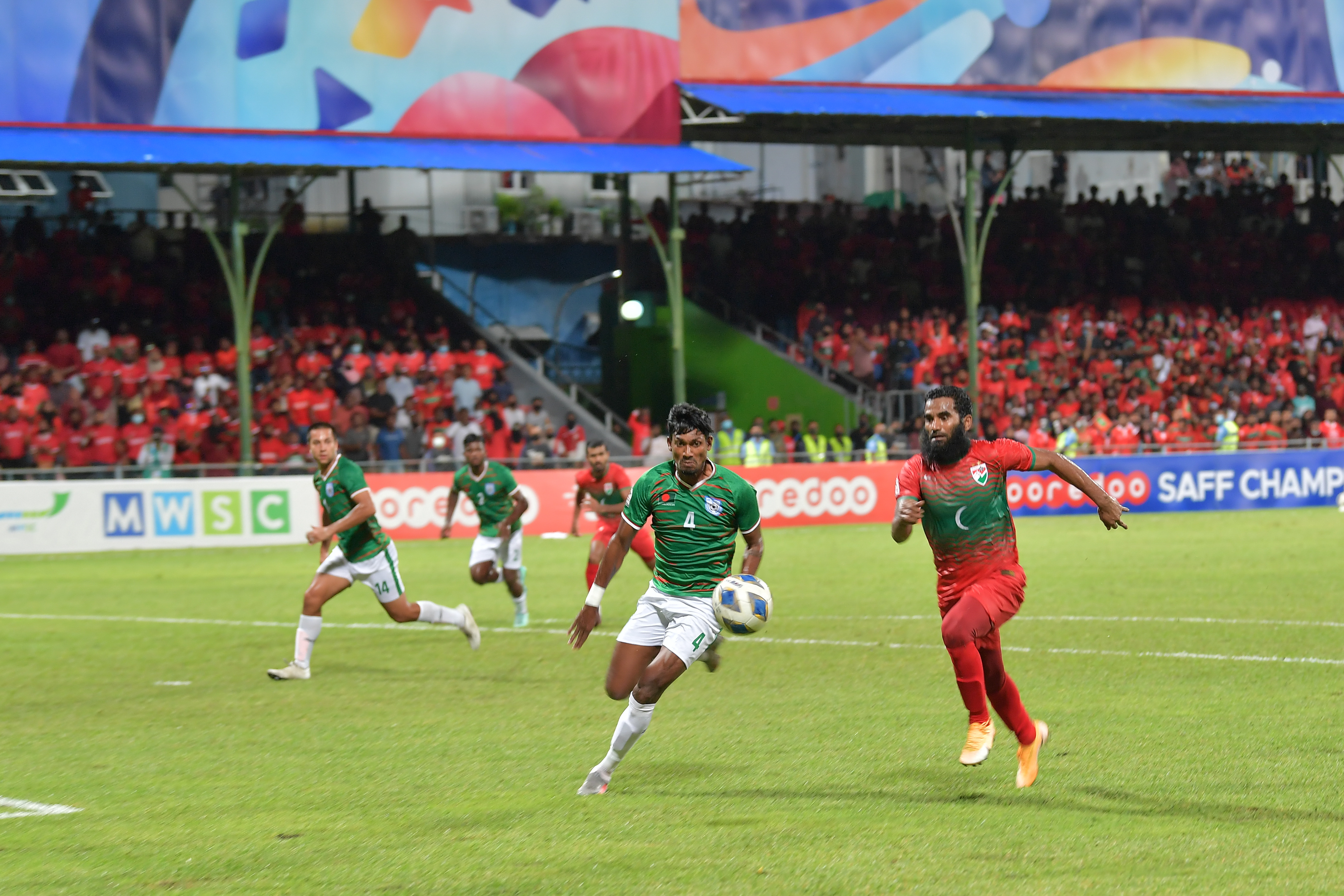
Bangladesh v Maldives during the 2021 SAFF Championship.

In international football, Bangladesh were winless for one thousand one hundred sixteen days from 5 April 2006 to 25 April 2009, suffering thirteen defeats during the nineteen games played. The team also failed to advanced past the group-stages of the SAFF Championship for the five editions held between 2011 and 2021. Furthermore, in the second round of the AFC Asian Cup 2019 qualification playoffs, Bangladesh, under Belgian head coach Tom Saintfiet, faced a humiliating defeat against Bhutan. Following a 0–0 draw in the first leg in Dhaka, Bhutan claimed a 3–1 victory in the return leg at Changlimithang Stadium in Thimphu. This prevented Bangladesh from competing in AFC and FIFA-sanctioned matches for the next two years. By February 2018, Bangladesh had plummeted to 197 in the FIFA Men's World Ranking, the country's lowest ranking to date. Although Bangladesh performed well at the youth level by reaching the 2018 Jakarta Asian Games round of 16, and winning both the 2015 SAFF U-16 Championship and 2018 SAFF U-15 Championship, the team struggled in AFC competitions.

On 26 June 2019, Dhaka Abahani became the first Bangladeshi club to reach the AFC Cup knock-out phase, by defeating Indian side Minarva Punjab 1–0. The team eventually crashed out of the Inter-zone play-off semi-finals, however, earned enough points to secure a place for a Bangladeshi club in the 2023–24 AFC Champions League qualifying play-offs. Nevertheless, In September 2019, domestic football suffered a setback when police raids revealed illegal casinos in several clubhouses. In the same year, top-tier club, Arambagh KS were relegated to the Senior Division due to their involvement in spot-fixing, match manipulations, live and online betting and other irregularities. Nevertheless, match-fixing remains prevalent in Bangladeshi domestic football, especially in the lower leagues, where gambling syndicates easily manipulate club officials with financial incentives. The BFF is often criticized for failing to properly punish those responsible.

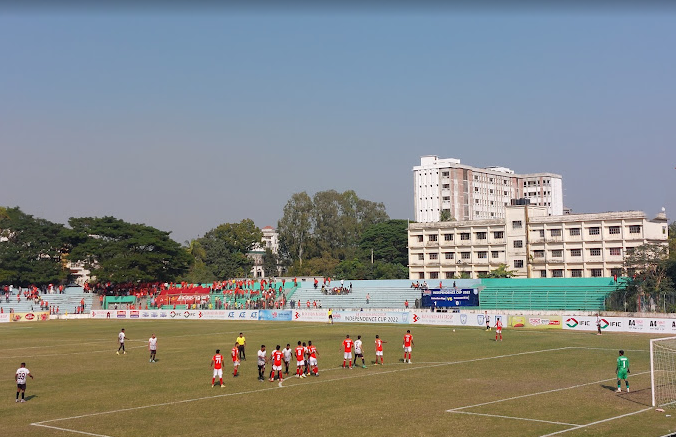
Dhaka Mohammedan and Bashundhara Kings in action during the 2022 Independence Cup.

Following the establishment of the Bashundhara Group-backed Bashundhara Kings, domestic football saw one-sided dominance, with the club winning the Bangladesh Football League for four consecutive seasons and becoming only the second club in the professional league era, after Sheikh Russel KC, to secure the domestic treble in the 2023–24 season. They also built the Bashundhara Kings Arena, becoming the first South Asian club to own a football stadium. However, despite their domestic success, the club has consistently underperformed at the continental level, failing to advance past the group stage of the AFC Cup in four attempts and crashing out of the 2023–24 AFC Champions League qualifying play-offs, which they entered due to Abahani's 2019 AFC Cup journey. Their disappointing AFC campaigns once again relegated Bangladesh to the third-tier AFC competition, now known as the AFC Challenge League.

== League system ==
Level	Divisions (as of 2024–25)
1	Bangladesh Football League; 10 clubs - 2 relegation
2	Bangladesh Championship League; 11 clubs - 2 promotion, 2 relegation
3	Dhaka Senior Division League; 18 clubs – 4 promotion, 2 relegation
4	Dhaka Second Division League; 15 clubs – 2 promotion, 2 relegation
5	Dhaka Third Division League; 15 clubs – 2 promotion, 2 relegation
6	Bangladesh Pioneer League unlimited number of clubs - 4 promotion

=== Youth League ===
Level	Divisions (as of 2024–25)
1	BFF U-18 League; 9 clubs

== Cup competitions ==
=== Domestic ===
- The Federation Cup (1980–present) is the country's premier cup competition. Only teams competing in the Bangladesh Football League are eligible to partake in the cup. It is the only domestic cup competition in the country affiliated with the Asian Football Confederation.
- The Independence Cup (1972–present) is a secondary cup competition in which teams from the Bangladesh Football League, Bangladesh Championship League, Service-Sectors and Universities can participate in.
- The Super Cup (2009–present) is the highest-budgeted football competition contested by clubs selected by the Bangladesh Football Federation.
- The Bangladesh Challenge Cup (2024–present) is a single match played between the winners of the Bangladesh Football League and the Federation Cup
- The DMFA Cup (1984–1995) was a cup competition held in Dhaka and organized by Dhaka Metropolitan League Committee contested by teams from Dhaka.
- The Independence Day Football Tournament (1948–1970) was a cup competition held in Dhaka during the East Pakistan era. The cup was contested by clubs and universities from Dhaka, and the cup final was held on 14 August to celebrate the Independence Day.

=== International ===
- The Sheikh Kamal International Club Cup (2015–present) is a biennial international club football tournament held in Chittagong.
- The Aga Khan Gold Cup (1958–1981) was a biennial continental club football tournament held in Dhaka. Many renowned football pundits regard this competition as a predecessor of AFC Champions League (held for the first time in 1967), since it was the first organized international competition that involved clubs from Asia.

=== Regional ===
- The National Football Championship (1973–present) currently known as the Bangabandhu National Football Championship and previously referred to as the Sher-e-Bangla Cup is a district-level national football tournament contested by districts and government institutions of the country.

=== Youth ===
- The BFF U-18 Football Tournament (2014–2019) was a youth club football tournament, where club's from the Bangladesh Football League competed in.
- The BFF U-16 Football Tournament (2022–present) is a youth club football tournament, where club's from the Bangladesh Championship League compete in.

== International tournaments ==
=== Major tournaments ===
Competition	Edition	Winner	Final	Runners-up	Bangladesh's position	Venues	Final venue
AFC Challenge Cup	2006	Sri Lanka	0–4	Tajikistan	Quarter-finals	3 (in 2 city)	Bangabandhu National Stadium
SAFF Championship	2003	Bangladesh	1–1 (5–4 p)	Maldives	Champions	1 (in 1 city)	Bangabandhu National Stadium
SAFF Championship	2009	India	0–0 (3–1 p)	Maldives	Semi-finals	1 (in 1 city)	Bangabandhu National Stadium
SAFF Championship	2018	Maldives	2–1	India	Group-stage	1 (in 1 city)	Bangabandhu National Stadium

=== Bangabandhu Cup ===
Edition	Winner	Final	Runners-up	Bangladesh's position	Venues	Final venue
1996–97	Malaysia Red	2–1	(Indonesia) PSM Makassar	DNP	1 (in 1 city)	Bangabandhu National Stadium
1999	(Japan) Japanese Third Division XI	3–2	Ghana U-23	Group-stage	1 (in 1 city)	Bangabandhu National Stadium
2015	Malaysia U-23	3–2	Bangladesh	Runners-up	1 (in 1 city)	Bangabandhu National Stadium
2016	Nepal	2–1	Bahrain U-21	Semi-finals	2 (in 2 city)	Bangabandhu National Stadium
2018	Palestine	0–0 (4–3 p)	Tajikistan	Semi-finals	3 (in 3 city)	Bangabandhu National Stadium
2020	Palestine	3–1	Burundi	Semi-finals	1 (in 1 city)	Bangabandhu National Stadium

=== Bangladesh President's Gold Cup ===
Edition	Winner	Final	Runners-up	Bangladesh's position	Venues	Final venue
1981	(South Korea) Seoul City Hall	2–0	Bangladesh Red	Semi-finals	1 (in 1 city)	Dhaka Stadium
1982	(China) Beijing	4–0	Thailand Youth	Group-stage	1 (in 1 city)	Dhaka Stadium
1983	(Iraq) Al-Shorta	2–0	Harimau Malaysia	Group-stage	1 (in 1 city)	Dhaka Stadium
1986	(Switzerland) Vevey Sports	3–2	(Finland) Turun Palloseura	Semi-finals	1 (in 1 city)	Dhaka Stadium
1987	Syria	4–1	(China) Guangdong	Semi-finals	1 (in 1 city)	Dhaka Stadium
1989	Bangladesh Red	1–1 (4–3 p)	(South Korea) Korea University	Champions	1 (in 1 city)	Mirpur Stadium
1993	(Romania) Petrolul Ploiești	1–0	(Poland) Polonia Warszawa	Semi-finals	1 (in 1 city)	Dhaka Stadium

== National teams ==
- Bangladesh national football team
- Bangladesh national football B team
- Bangladesh national under-23 football team
- Bangladesh national under-20 football team
- Bangladesh national under-17 football team

== Stadiums ==
- Football stadiums with a capacity of 20,000 or higher are included in this list.

#	Image	Stadium	Current capacity	Location	Opened
1		M. A. Aziz Stadium	40,000	Chittagong	1955
2		Faridpur Stadium	30,000	Faridpur	1960
3		Rafiq Uddin Bhuiyan Stadium	25,000	Mymensingh	1961
4		Sheikh Kamal Stadium	25,000	Nilphamari	1984
5		Mostafa Kamal Stadium	25,000	Kamalapur, Dhaka	2001
6		Tangail Stadium	25,000	Tangail	1998
7		Rangpur Stadium	25,000	Rangpur	1968
8		National Stadium, Dhaka	22,400	Motijheel, Dhaka	1954
9		Bangladesh Army Stadium	20,000	Dhaka	1970
10		Saifur Rahman Stadium	20,000	Moulvibazar	2005

== See also ==
- List of Bangladeshi football champions
- List of football clubs in Bangladesh
