= Dhaka Third Division Football League =

- Logo of 2022–23 season
- Founded: 1951; 75 years ago
- First season: 1951 (recognized)
- Country: Bangladesh
- Confederation: AFC
- Number of clubs: 15 (as of 2022–23 season)
- Level on pyramid: 3 (1971–1992); 4 (1993–2011); 5 (2012–present)
- Promotion to: Dhaka Second Division League
- Relegation to: Bangladesh Pioneer League
- Current champions: Chawkbazar Kings (1 title)
- Website: bff.com.bd
- Current: 2025–26 Dhaka Third Division Football League

Dhaka Third Division Football League (Bengali: ঢাকা তৃতীয় বিভাগ ফুটবল লিগ), officially known as Bashundhara Group Third Division (U-17) Football League due to sponsorship reasons and change of format, is the fifth-tier football league in Bangladesh, as well as the third and lowest league division in Dhaka.

It officially began in 1951 as the league below the Second Division while Bangladesh was still part of Pakistan. From the 2022–23 season, the league is being arranged as an under-17 league.

The league is the lowest division of semi-professional football in the country and the two top-finishing teams are automatically promoted to the Dhaka Second Division Football League. While the bottom two teams are relegated to the country's amateur age-level football league, the Bangladesh Pioneer Football League.

== History ==
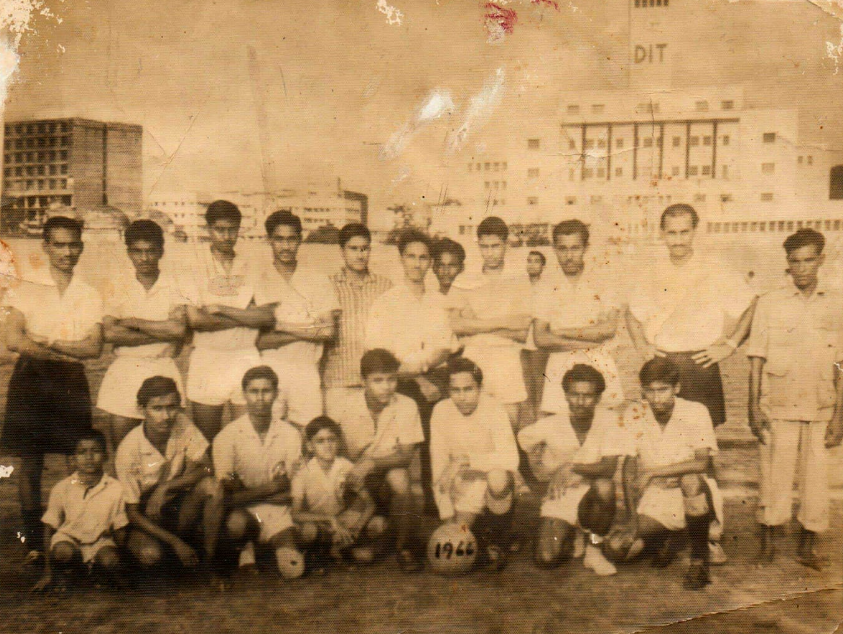
Rayer Bazar Club which played in the Dhaka Third Division Football League at the Outer Stadium in 1966.

On 16 September 2021, the Bangladesh Football Federation decided to shut down the Dhaka Third Division League from the 2021–2022 season. The decision received much scrutiny from clubs participating in the Dhaka Football League. On 3 January 2023, BFF announced that the 2021–2022 league season would finally begin from 7 January 2023, and participating clubs will only be allowed to field U17 players.

== Structure ==
As of February 2025.

Level	Division	Class
1	Bangladesh Football League; 10 clubs ↓ 2 relegation spot	Professional
2	Bangladesh Championship League; 10 clubs ↑ 2 teams promoted ↓ 2 teams relegated	Professional
3	Dhaka Senior Division League; 18 clubs ↑ 4 teams promoted ↓ 2 teams relegated	Semi-professional
4	Dhaka Second Division League; 15 clubs ↑ 2 teams promoted ↓ 2 teams relegated	Semi-professional
5	Dhaka Third Division League; 15 clubs ↑ 2 teams promoted ↓ 2 teams relegated	Semi-professional
6	Bangladesh Pioneer League; Unlimited number of clubs ↑ 4 teams promoted No relegation	Amateur

== Results ==
Further Information: List of Dhaka Football League champions

=== Third-tier league: 1951–1992 ===
Season	Champion	Promoted Runners-up	Ref.
1951	N/A		
1952	Holden XI	None	
1953	N/A		
1954	N/A		
1955	N/A		
1956	PWD SC	None	
1957	N/A		
1958	N/A		
1959	N/A		
1960	N/A		
1961	Fakirerpool YMC	None	
1962	Shahjahanpur SC	None	
1963	Rahmatganj MFS	None	
1964	EPIDC	None	
1965	Dilkusha SC	None	
1966	Bachelors' Club	None	
1967	EPWAPDA SC	None	
1968	Dhanmondi Club & Farashganj SC (joint)	None	
1969	EPRTC SC	None	
1970	Arambagh KS & Dhaka SC (joint)	None	
1971	Not Held		
1972	Not completed		
1973	Brothers Union	None	
1974	Shantinagar Club	None	
1975	Agrani Bank SC	None	
1976	Shahjahanpur SC	None	
1977	Bangladesh Rifles	None	
1978	Not Held		
1979	The Muslim Institute	None	
1980	Rayer Bazar AC	None	
1981	Lalbagh SC	None	
1982	Not Held		
1983	Mirpur Chalantika	None	
1984	Adamjee Jute Mills SCC	None	
1985	Avijatrik Malibagh	None	
1986	East Bengal Limited	None	
1987	Bangladesh Boys Club	Jurain Janata Club	
1988–89	Eskaton Sabuj Sangha Club	Prantik KC	
1989–90	Mohakhali Ekadosh	Nobarun Sangsad	
1991	Not Held		
1991–92 (Note: The league was held during the 1992 season)	Lalmatia Club	Badda Jagoroni Sangsad	

=== Fourth-tier league: 1993–2011 ===
Season	Champion	Promoted Runners-up	Promoted Third Place	Promoted Fourth Place	Ref.
1993 (Note: The league was held during the 1994 season)	Basabo Tarun Sangha	Government Printing Press	None	None	
1994 (Note: The league was held during the 1995 season)	Gendaria Famous Club	Little Friends Club	None	None	
1995 (Note: The league was held during the 1996 season)	Prantik KC	East End Boys Club	None	None	
1996 (Note: The league was held during the 1997 season)	T&T Club Motijheel	Jatrabari KC	None	None	
1997 (Note: The league was held during the 1998–99 season)	Kashaituly SKP	Sheikh Russel KC	None	None	
1998	Not Held				
1999	Not Held				
2000 (Note: The league was held during the 2001 season)	MSPCC City Club	Purbachal Parishad	None	None	
2001 (Note: The league was held during the 2002)	Kadamtola Sangsad	Dipali Jubo Sangha	None	None	
2002 (Note: The league was held during the 2002–03 season)	Little Friends Club	Sunrise SC	None	None	
2003–04	Uttar Baridhara Club	Kawran Bazar PS	None	None	
2005–06	Not Held				
2006–07	Euro Famous Club	Gazirchot XI	Matuail Udayan Sangsad	Friends SWO	
2007–08	Not Held				
2008	Not Held				
2009	PWD SC	Swadhinata KS	None	None	
2010	Not Held				
2011	Dilkusha SC	Tongi KC	Shantinagar Club	None	

=== Fifth-tier league: 2012–present ===
Season	Champion	Promoted Runner Up	Promoted Third Place	Promoted Fourth Place	Promoted Fifth Place	Ref.
2012	Not Held					
2013	Nobabpur KC	Somaj Kallyan KS Mugda	Kashaituly SKP	None	None	
2014	Not Held					
2015	Dilkusha SC	BKSP	Khilgaon FA	Gouripur SC	None	
2016	Not Held					
2017	Not Held					
2018	Arambagh FA	Kadamtola Sangsad	Siddique Bazar Dhaka Jr. SC	Saif SC Jr.	Jatrabari JS	
2018–19	Not Held					
2019–20	Alamgir Shomaj Kollyan KS	Kingstar SC	Kallol Sangha	Jabid Ahsan Sohel KC	Bikrampur Kings	
2020–21	Not Held					
2021–22	Not Held					
2022–23	Chawkbazar Kings	Elias Ahmed Chowdhury SS	None	None	None	

== Top scorers ==
Season	Player	Clubs	Goals	Ref.
2017–18	(Bangladesh) Rimon Hossain	Arambagh FA	8	
2019–20	(Bangladesh) Shekh Morsalin	Alamgir Shomaj Kollyan KS	19	
2022–23	(Bangladesh) Abir Hossain	Chawkbazar Kings	11	
2022–23	(Bangladesh) Tamim Hossain	The Muslim Institute	11	
