= Pioneer Football League (Bangladesh) =

- Founded: 1981; 45 years ago
- Country: Bangladesh
- Confederation: AFC
- Number of clubs: 46
- Level on pyramid: 4 (1981–1992); 5 (1993–2011); 6 (2012–present)
- Promotion to: Dhaka Third Division League
- Current champions: Barishal Academy (2021–22)
- Website: www.bff.com.bd

Pioneer Football League (Bengali: পাইওনিয়ার ফুটবল লিগ), also known as the Bangladesh Pioneer Football League, is an age-level league and also the sixth-tier of Bangladeshi football organised by Bangladesh Football Federation. The semi-finalists of the competition are promoted to the Dhaka Third Division Football League. As the tournament is considered to be the lowest level of Bangladeshi football, there is no limit on the number of teams that can participate and any club can apply to join the tournament.

== History ==
The league unofficially started on 29 April 1980. A total of 160 teams participated in the qualifiers, from which 80 teams got a chance in the final stage. But the tournament was not registered as the Bangladesh Football Federation did not determine a champion and runner-up team. The Pioneer League officially started in 1981. In its first edition the league was inaugurated by the Speaker of the National Assembly (MNA), Shamsul Huda Chaudhury.

on September 24, 1983, the then FIFA President João Havelange inaugurated the league at the Dhaka Stadium. The next few editions saw the league being inaugurated by Prime Minister's Khaleda Zia and Sheikh Hasina.

== Format ==
As of 2021–2022

- A total of 46 teams were split into five zones - Central, East, West, North and South.
- The matches will be held at the five different venues- Paltan Outer Stadium, Gopibagh Brother Union ground, Mirpur Golartek ground, Uttara Sector 14 ground and Fatullah Aliganj ground. Each venue will host 2 groups.
- A total of 20 teams will play in the Super League, two from each zone. In the Super League, 20 teams will play in four groups.
- The four group champions will play the semi-finals. These four semi-finalists will advance to the Dhaka Third Division Football League.

== Structure ==
As of February 2025.

Level	Division	Class
1	Bangladesh Football League; 10 clubs ↓ 2 relegation spot	Professional
2	Bangladesh Championship League; 10 clubs ↑ 2 teams promoted ↓ 2 teams relegated	Professional
3	Dhaka Senior Division League; 18 clubs ↑ 4 teams promoted ↓ 2 teams relegated	Semi-professional
4	Dhaka Second Division League; 15 clubs ↑ 2 teams promoted ↓ 2 teams relegated	Semi-professional
5	Dhaka Third Division League; 15 clubs ↑ 2 teams promoted ↓ 2 teams relegated	Semi-professional
6	Bangladesh Pioneer League; Unlimited number of clubs ↑ 4 teams promoted No relegation	Amateur

== Champions ==
Season	Champion	Runner up	Third place	Fourth Place	Ref.
2012	Khilgaon FA	Matuail Udayan	Nasrin FA	None	
2013–2014	Narinda Junior Lions	Araf Sporting	Kollol Sangaa	None	
2014–15	Bangladesh Ansar	Tangail FA	Fakirerpool STS	None	
2016	Arambagh FA	Gazipur City FA	Bashundhara Kings	None	
2017	Kingstar SC	City Club	Asaduzzaman FA	Wajed Miya KC	
2019–20	Elias AC SS	Uttar Bongo	FC Brahmanbaria	Green Welfare Center	
2021–22	Barishal Academy	GV Kishor Bangla	Prantik Junior	Feni SA	

== Individual awards ==
=== Top-scorer ===
Season	Player	Club	Goals	Ref.
2014–15	Mohammad Jewel	Bangladesh Ansar	22	
2019–20	Mahfuz Ahmed	Eskaton SSC	20	
2021–22	Mehdi Hasan Minar	Skylark	15	

=== Player of the tournament ===
Season	Player	Club	Ref.
2021–22	Raihan Mia	Barishal Academy	

=== Player of the final ===
Season	Player	Club	Ref.
2021–22	Akash Islam	Barishal Academy	
