= 2021–22 in Bangladeshi football =

Bangladeshi football season

Football in Bangladesh
- Season: 2021–22

Men's football
- BPL: Bashundhara Kings
- BCL: Fortis FC
- 1st Division: Somaj Kallyan KS Mugda
- 2nd Division: Saif SC Youth Team
- 4th Division: Barishal Academy
- U-18 League: Sheikh Jamal DC U-18
- U-16 League: Kawran Bazar PS U-16
- Independence Cup: Dhaka Abahani
- Federation Cup: Dhaka Abahani

Women's football
- BWFL: Bashundhara Kings Women

The following article presents a summary of the 2021–22 football (soccer) season in Bangladesh, which is the 50th season of competitive football in the country.

== National team ==
=== Bangladesh men's national football team ===
==== 2021 SAFF Championship ====
Pos	Team	Pld	W	D	L	GF	GA	GD	Pts	Qualification
1	India	4	2	2	0	5	2	+3	8	Advance to the final
2	Nepal	4	2	1	1	5	4	+1	7	Advance to the final
3	Maldives (H)	4	2	0	2	4	4	0	6	
4	Bangladesh	4	1	2	1	3	4	−1	5	
5	Sri Lanka	4	0	1	3	2	5	−3	1	

Source: Soccerway
Rules for classification: 1) Points; 2) Head to Head; 3) Goal difference; 4) Goals scored
(H) Hosts

===== Matches =====
1 October 2021 2021 SAFF Championship	Sri Lanka	0–1	Bangladesh	Malé, Maldives
21:00 UTC+5		Report	Barman 56' (pen.)	Stadium: National Football Stadium; Referee: Feras Taweel (Syria)

4 October 2021 2021 SAFF Championship	Bangladesh	1–1	India	Malé, Maldives
16:00 UTC+5	Arafat 74'	Report	Chhetri 26'	Stadium: National Football Stadium; Referee: Majed Al-Shamrani (Saudi Arabia)

7 October 2021 2021 SAFF Championship	Maldives	2–0	Bangladesh	Malé, Maldives
21:00 UTC+5	Mohamed 55'; Ashfaq 74' (pen.)	Report		Stadium: National Football Stadium; Referee: Yousif Saeed Hassan (Iraq)

13 October 2021 2021 SAFF Championship	Bangladesh	1–1	Nepal	Malé, Maldives
16:00 UTC+5	Reza 9'	Report	Bista 88' (pen.)	Stadium: National Football Stadium; Referee: Akhrol Riskullaev (Uzbekistan)

==== Results and fixtures ====
3 June 2021 2022 World Cup qualification	Bangladesh	1–1	Afghanistan	Doha, Qatar
17:00 UTC+3	Barman 83'	Report	Sharifi 47'	Stadium: Jassim Bin Hamad Stadium; Attendance: 300; Referee: Mooud Bonyadifar (Iran)

7 June 2021 2022 World Cup qualification	Bangladesh	0–2	India	Doha, Qatar
17:00 UTC+3		Report	Chhetri 79', 90+2'	Stadium: Jassim Bin Hamad Stadium; Attendance: 495; Referee: Zaid Thamer (Iraq)

15 June 2021 2022 World Cup qualification	Bangladesh	0–3	Oman	Doha, Qatar
20:00 UTC+3		Report	Al-Ghafri 22'; Al-Hajri 60', 80'	Stadium: Jassim Bin Hamad Stadium; Attendance: 885; Referee: Ali Shaban (Kuwait)

5 September 2021 2021 Three Nations Cup	Bangladesh	0–2	Palestine	Bishkek, Kyrgyzstan
20:30 UTC+6		Report	Kharoub 33'; Hamed 47'	Stadium: Dolen Omurzakov Stadium

7 September 2021 2021 Three Nations Cup	Kyrgyzstan	4–1	Bangladesh	Bishkek, Kyrgyzstan
20:30 UTC+6	Moldozhunusov 10'; Shukurov 39'; Rustamov 46'; Duyshobekov 89'	Report	Sufil 53'	Stadium: Dolen Omurzakov Stadium

9 September 2021 Unofficial Friendly	Kyrgyzstan U23	3–2	Bangladesh	Bishkek, Kyrgyzstan
20:30 UTC+6			Sumon 11', 64'	Stadium: Dolen Omurzakov Stadium

7 October 2021 2021 SAFF Championship	Maldives	2–0	Bangladesh	Malé, Maldives
21:00 UTC+5	Mohamed 55'; Ashfaq 74' (pen.)	Report		Stadium: National Football Stadium; Referee: Yousif Saeed Hassan (Iraq)

10 November 2021 2021 Four Nations Football Tournament	Bangladesh	1–1	Seychelles	Colombo, Sri Lanka
15:30 UTC+5:30	M.Ibrahim 17'	Report	B. Labrosse 88'	Stadium: Racecourse Ground; Referee: Kasun Lakmal Weerakkody (Sri Lanka)

13 November 2021 2021 Four Nations Football Tournament	Bangladesh	2–1	Maldives	Colombo, Sri Lanka
16:30 UTC+5:30	J. Bhuyan 12'; T. Barman 86' (pen.)	Report	A. Ibrahim 33'	Stadium: Racecourse Ground; Referee: Hettikamkanamge Perera (Sri Lanka)

16 November 2021 2021 Four Nations Football Tournament	Sri Lanka	2–1	Bangladesh	Colombo, Sri Lanka
21:30 UTC+5:30	W. Razeek 25', 90+1' (pen.)	Report	J. Rana 71'	Stadium: Racecourse Ground

== Bangladesh Premier League ==
The league will start on January and schedule to end TBD.

=== Teams ===
- Bashundhara Kings
- Bangladesh Police FC
- Chittagong Abahani
- Dhaka Abahani
- Dhaka Mohammedan
- Muktijoddha Sangsad KC
- Rahmatganj MFS
- Saif SC
- Sheikh Jamal Dhanmondi Club
- Sheikh Russel KC
- Swadhinata KS
- Uttar Baridhara

=== League table ===
Pos	Team	Pld	W	D	L	GF	GA	GD	Pts	Qualification or relegation
1	Bashundhara Kings (C, Q)	22	18	3	1	53	21	+32	57	Qualification for 2023 AFC Champions League Play-off round or 2023 AFC Cup Group Stage
2	Dhaka Abahani (Q)	22	14	5	3	55	31	+24	47	Qualification for 2023 AFC Cup Play-off round
3	Saif Sporting Club	22	11	4	7	58	37	+21	37	
4	Sheikh Jamal DC	22	9	8	5	34	31	+3	35	
5	Dhaka Mohammedan	22	8	9	5	39	26	+13	33	
6	Sheikh Russel KC	22	8	7	7	35	31	+4	31	
7	Chittagong Abahani	22	8	7	7	39	42	−3	31	
8	Bangladesh Police FC	22	8	6	8	28	32	−4	30	
9	Muktijoddha Sangsad KC	22	5	4	13	27	42	−15	19	
10	Rahmatganj MFS	22	4	6	12	33	46	−13	18	
11	Uttar Baridhara Club (R)	22	3	5	14	24	58	−34	14	Relegation to Bangladesh Championship League
12	Swadhinata KS (R)	22	2	4	16	22	50	−28	10	Relegation to Bangladesh Championship League

Source: Soccerway
Rules for classification: 1) Points; 2) Goal difference; 3) Goals scored.
(C) Champions; (Q) Qualify for the AFC competition; (R) Relegated

== Bangladesh Championship League ==
The league kicked off from 20 February 2022 and ended on 13 June 2022.

=== Teams ===
- Agrani Bank Ltd. SC
- Uttara FC
- Gopalganj Sporting Club
- Farashganj SC
- Dhaka WC
- NoFeL Sporting Club
- T&T Club Motijheel
- BFF Elite Academy FC
- Fakierpool YMC
- Kawran Bazar PS
- Wari Club
- Fortis FC
- Swadhinata KS
- ~~Brothers Union~~ (will not participate in the upcoming 2021–22 Bangladesh Championship League season)

=== League table ===
Pos	Team	Pld	W	D	L	GF	GA	GD	Pts	Qualification or relegation
1	Fortis FC (C, P)	22	13	8	1	29	9	+20	47	Qualification to 2022–23 BPL
2	AFC Uttara (P)	22	11	9	2	36	14	+22	42	Qualification to 2022–23 BPL
3	NoFeL Sporting Club	22	10	8	4	36	17	+19	38	
4	BFF Elite Academy	22	9	4	9	24	20	+4	31	
5	Gopalganj Sporting Club	22	8	7	7	20	20	0	31	
6	Fakirerpool YMC	22	6	11	5	26	21	+5	29	
7	Uttara FC	22	7	6	9	33	40	−7	27	
8	Wari Club	22	6	7	9	19	20	−1	25	
9	Dhaka Wanderers	22	6	7	9	26	34	−8	25	
10	Agrani Bank Ltd. SC	22	7	3	12	24	39	−15	24	
11	Farashganj SC (R)	22	5	8	9	19	24	−5	23	Relegation to Senior Division Football League
12	Kawran Bazar PS (R)	22	3	4	15	11	45	−34	13	Relegation to Senior Division Football League

Source: GSA
Rules for classification: 1) Points; 2) Goal difference; 3) Goals scored;
(C) Champions; (P) Promoted; (R) Relegated

== Senior Division League ==
The league kicked off from 10 August 2022 and ended on 26 October 2022.

=== Teams ===
- ~~Arambagh KS~~ (couldn't participate in this edition of the league as FIFA imposed a transfer-ban on the club)
- ~~Dhaka City FC~~ (withdrew due to unknown reason)
- PWD Sports Club
- Jatrabari KC
- Mohakhali Ekadosh
- Badda Jagoroni Sangsad
- Bangladesh Boys Club
- Koshaituli Somaj Kollayan Parishad
- Somaj Kallyan KS Mugda
- East End Club
- Dilkusha Sporting Club
- Nobabpur Krira Chakra
- Basabo Torun Shangha
- Sadharan Bima Corporation Sporting Club
- Friends Social Welfare Organization
- Victoria Sporting Club

=== League table ===
Pos	Team	Pld	W	D	L	GF	GA	GD	Pts	Qualification or relegation
1	Somaj Kallyan KS Mugda (C, P)	13	9	4	0	21	8	+13	31	Qualification for the BCL 2023–24
2	Jatrabari KC (P)	13	8	3	2	18	4	+14	27	Qualification for the BCL 2023–24
3	PWD Sporting Club	13	7	3	3	14	5	+9	24	
4	Koshaituli SKP	13	6	4	3	15	8	+7	22	
5	Mohakhali Ekadosh	12	5	3	4	11	8	+3	18	
6	Badda Jagoroni	12	5	3	4	17	15	+2	18	
7	Bangladesh Boys Club	13	3	7	3	7	7	0	16	
8	Nobabpur KC	12	4	2	6	9	12	−3	14	
9	Sadharan Bima CSC	12	3	5	4	9	13	−4	14	
10	Basabo Torun Shangha	13	2	7	4	6	10	−4	13	
11	Friends Social WO	13	3	4	6	6	12	−6	13	
12	East End Club (R)	12	3	2	7	10	17	−7	11	Relegation to the Second Division League 2022–23
13	Victoria Sporting Club (R)	13	2	4	7	7	16	−9	10	Relegation to the Second Division League 2022–23
14	Dilkusha Sporting Club (R)	12	1	3	8	7	22	−15	6	Relegation to the Second Division League 2022–23

Source: BFF
Rules for classification: 1) Points; 2) Goal difference; 3) Goals scored;
(C) Champions; (P) Promoted; (R) Relegated

== Domestic Cups ==
=== Independence Cup ===
Competition	Champions	Ref
Independence Cup	Dhaka Abahani	

=== Federation Cup ===
Competition	Champions	Ref
Bangladesh Federation Cup	Dhaka Abahani	

== Youth Competition Champions ==
Competition	Champions	Ref
Sheikh Russel U-18 Gold Cup	Wari Thana	
BFF U-18 Football League	Sheikh Jamal Dhanmondi Club U-18	
BFF U-16 Football Tournament	Kawran Bazar Pragati Sangha U-16	

== Bangladeshi clubs in International Competition ==
=== AFC Cup ===
Pos	Team	Pld	W	D	L	GF	GA	GD	Pts	Qualification	MBSG	BSK	BFC	MAZ
1	(India) ATK Mohun Bagan	3	2	1	0	6	2	+4	7	Inter-zone play-off semi-finals	—	1–1	2–0	—
2	(Bangladesh) Bashundhara Kings	3	1	2	0	3	1	+2	5		—	—	—	2–0
3	(India) Bengaluru	3	1	1	1	6	4	+2	4		—	0−0	—	—
4	(Maldives) Maziya (H)	3	0	0	3	3	11	−8	0		1–3	—	2–6	—

Source: AFC
(H) Hosts

18 August 2021	Bashundhara Kings (Bangladesh)	2–0	(Maldives) Maziya	National Football Stadium, Malé
21:00 UTC+5	Irufaan 25' (o.g.); Robinho 40'	Live Report; Stats Report		Attendance: o Referee: Ali Reda (Lebanon)

21 August 2021	Bengaluru (India)	0−0	(Bangladesh) Bashundhara Kings	National Football Stadium, Malé
16:00 UTC+5		Live Report; Stats Report		Attendance: 0 Referee: Thoriq Alkatiri (Indonesia)

24 August 2021	ATK Mohun Bagan (India)	v	(Bangladesh) Bashundhara Kings	National Football Stadium, Malé
	Williams 62'	Live Report; Stats Report	Fernandes 28'	Attendance: 0 Referee: Qassim Al-Hatmi (Oman)

== Women's Football ==
Pos	Team	Pld	W	D	L	GF	GA	GD	Pts	Qualification
1	Bashundhara Kings	11	11	0	0	100	1	+99	33	Champion
2	ARB College SC	11	10	0	1	71	5	+66	30	Runner-up
3	Uttara FC Women	11	7	2	2	25	7	+18	23	
4	Siraj Srity Songsod	11	6	1	4	29	15	+14	19	
5	Barishal Football Academy	11	5	0	6	24	18	+6	15	
6	Nasrin Sporting Club	11	4	3	4	18	39	−21	15	
7	Cumilla United	11	3	4	4	12	26	−14	13	
8	Suddopuskorini Jubo SC	11	4	1	6	17	33	−16	13	
9	Jamalpur Kacharipara Akadas	11	4	1	6	12	38	−26	13	
10	FC Brahmanbaria	11	3	2	6	15	47	−32	11	
11	Dhaka Rangers FC	11	1	2	8	6	47	−41	5	
12	Farashganj SC Women	11	0	0	11	2	55	−53	0	

Source: Azscore
