= BFF U-16 Football Tournament =

Youth football competition in Bangladesh

- Logo of 2021-22 edition
- Organiser(s): Bangladesh Football Federation
- Founded: 20 September 2022
- Region: Bangladesh
- Teams: 12
- Current champions: Wari Club U-16
- Most championships: Kawran Bazar PS U-16; Wari Club U-16 (1 title each)
- Broadcaster(s): Bangladesh Football Federation (on Facebook and YouTube)
- Website: https://www.bff.com.bd/
- 2023–24 BFF U-16 Football League

The BFF U-16 Football Tournament is a youth football competition of the Bangladeshi football league system for youth players under 16 years old where youth teams of Bangladesh Championship League teams compete in. Founded in 2022, it is administered by the Bangladesh Football Federation (BFF).

== History ==
On 20 September 2022, the Bangladesh Football Federation (BFF) decided to launch the BFF U-16 Football Tournament for the U-16 players of clubs participating in Bangladeshi football's second-tier, the Bangladesh Championship League (BCL). The tournament was founded alongside the BFF U-18 Football League for Bangladesh Premier League clubs, however, due to the lack of finance available to the BCL teams the competition would be held in a tournament format instead of a league.

== Format ==
As per 2021–22 season, all the participant teams will be divided into two groups. Every team will play once against the other teams of their group in group phase. The champion and runners-up of both groups will qualify for semi-final.

== Current teams ==
As of 2021-22 season.

Team	Location
Agrani Bank Ltd. SC U-16	Dhaka
Azampur Football Club U-16	Dhaka (Uttara)
Gopalganj Sporting Club U-16	Gopalganj
Dhaka Wanderers Club U-16	Dhaka (Motijheel)
Farashganj SC U-16	Dhaka (Farashganj)
Fakirerpool YMC U-16	Dhaka (Motijheel)
Fortis FC U-16	Dhaka (Badda)
Kawran Bazar PS U-16	Dhaka (Kawran Bazar)
NoFeL Sporting Club U-16	Noakhali
Uttara FC U-16	Dhaka (Uttara)
Wari Club U-16	Dhaka (Motijheel)

== Cup winners and finalists ==
Year	Winners	Score	Runners-up	Ref.
2021-22	Kawran Bazar PS U-16	3–0	Wari Club U-16	
2023–24	Wari Club U-16	League format	Fakirerpool YMC U-16	

== Statistics by club ==
Team	Winner	Runners-up	Years won	Years runners-up
Kawran Bazar PS U-16	1		2021–22	
Wari Club U-16	1	1	2023–24	2021–22
Fakirerpool YMC U-16		1		2021–22

== Top goalscorers by edition ==
Years	Players	Clubs	Goals
2021–22	(Bangladesh) Abu Bokkor Siddik	Fortis FC U-16	6
2021–22	(Bangladesh) Arif Hosen Sobuj	Kawran Bazar PS U-16	6
2023–24	(Bangladesh) Md Minarul Islam Milon	Wari Club U-16	4

== Awards ==
=== Player of the Tournament ===
Year	Player	Team	Ref
2021–22	(Bangladesh) Mawardy Rahman	Kawran Bazar PS U-16	
2023–24	(Bangladesh) Farharn Ahmed Hridoy	PWD Sports U-16	

== Sponsorship ==
Period	Sponsor
2021–2022	No main sponsor

== Media coverage ==
28 matches of season 2021–2022 were broadcast live at Bangladesh Football Federation on Facebook and YouTube.

== See also ==
- BFF U-18 Football League
