= 2021–22 BFF U-16 Football Tournament =

Tournament details
- Host country: Bangladesh
- Dates: 21 September–11 October 2022
- Teams: 11
- Venue: 2 (in 1 host city)

Final positions
- Champions: Kawran Bazar PS U-16 (1st title)
- Runners-up: Wari Club U-16

Tournament statistics
- Matches played: 28
- Goals scored: 113 (4.04 per match)
- Top scorer(s): 6 goals (Bangladesh) Abu Bokkor Siddik (Fortis FC U-16) (Bangladesh) Arif Hosen Sobuj (Kawran Bazar PS U-16)
- Best player: (Bangladesh) Akash Islam (Wari Club U-16)
- Fair play award: Wari Club U-16

The 2021–22 BFF U-16 Football Tournament was the inaugural edition of the BFF U-16 Football Tournament. The youth teams of 11 BCL clubs competing in the tournament. It was played from 20 September to 11 October 2022 at two venues in Dhaka.

Karan Bazar PS U-16 is the defending champion having won against Wari Club U-16 by 3–0 goals in the final on 11 October 2022.

== Format ==
All the participant teams will be divided into two groups. Every team will play once against the other teams of their group in group phase. The champion and runners-up of both groups will qualify for the semi-final.

== Participating teams ==
The following eleven team were participated in the tournament.

Team	Appearances	Previous best performance
AFC Uttara U-16	Debut	
Agrani Bank Ltd. SC U-16	Debut	
Dhaka Wanderers Club U-16	Debut	
Gopalganj Sporting Club U-16	Debut	
Farashganj SC U-16	Debut	
Fakirerpool YMC U-16	Debut	
Fortis FC U-16	Debut	
Kawran Bazar PS U-16	Debut	
NoFeL Sporting Club U-16	Debut	
Uttara FC U-16	Debut	
Wari Club U-16	Debut	

== Draw ==
The draw ceremony were held at BFF house at Motijheel, Dhaka on 18 September 2022.

Group A	Group B
NoFeL Sporting Club U-16; Agrani Bank Ltd. SC U-16; Fakirerpool YMC U-16; Uttara FC U-16; Wari Club U-16	Fortis FC U-16; Kawran Bazar PS U-16; Dhaka Wanderers U-16; Farashganj SC U-16; Gopalganj Sporting Club U-16; AFC Uttara U-16

== Round matches dates ==
Phase	Date
Group Stages	20 September–4 October 2022
Semi finals	7–8 October 2022
Final	11 October 2022

== Venues ==
All matches will be played following two ground.

Dhaka	Dhaka is located in Bangladesh	Dhaka
BFF Artificial Turf	Dhaka is located in Bangladesh	Outer Stadium, Paltan

== Group stages ==
- All matches will be played at Dhaka, Bangladesh.
- Times listed are UTC+6:00.

Key to colours in group tables
Group winners and Runners-up advance to the Semi-finals

=== Group A ===
Pos	Team	Pld	W	D	L	GF	GA	GD	Pts	Qualification
1	Wari Club U-16	4	2	2	0	6	1	+5	8	Knockout stage
2	Uttara FC U-16	4	2	1	1	10	3	+7	7	Knockout stage
3	Fakirerpool YMC U-16	4	1	2	1	8	6	+2	5	
4	NoFeL Sporting Club U-16	4	1	2	1	6	8	−2	5	
5	Agrani Bank Ltd. SC U-16	4	0	1	3	3	15	−12	1	

Source: BFF

20 September 2022
15:00

Uttara FC U-16	0–1	Wari Club U-16
	Report	Akash 66'

Outer Stadium, Paltan
20 September 2022
15:00

Fakirerpool YMC U-16	6–0	Agrani Bank Ltd. SC U-16
Jony 3'; Samir 19'; Akash 40', 69'; Ashraful 50'; Jamim 51'	Report

BFF Artificial Turf, Dhaka

23 September 2022
15:00

Uttara FC U-16	4–0	NoFeL Sporting Club U-16
Yasin 26', 37'; Tamim 82'; Limon 84'	Report

BFF Artificial Turf, Dhaka
23 September 2022
15:00

Fakirerpool Young Men's Club U-16	0–0	Wari Club U-16
	Report

Outer Stadium, Paltan

26 September 2022
15:00

NoFeL Sporting Club U-16	1–1	Wari Club U-16
Mondol 46'	Report	Sifar 2'

BFF Artificial Turf, Dhaka
26 September 2022
15:00

Uttara FC U-16	1–1	Agrani Bank Ltd. SC U-16
Limon 8'	Report	Sajjad 61'

Outer Stadium, Paltan

29 September 2022
15:00

Agrani Bank Ltd. SC U-16	0–4	Wari Club U-16
	Report	Ahsan 37'; Akash 71'; Billah 83'; Nurunabi 89'

BFF Artificial Turf, Dhaka
29 September 2022
15:00

Fakirerpool Young Men's Club U-16	1–1	NoFeL Sporting Club U-16
Maruf 60'	Report	Nahidul 36'

Outer Stadium, Paltan

2 October 2022
15:00

Uttara FC U-16	5–1	Fakirerpool Young Men's Club U-16
Iqbal 15'; Nazmul 29'; Yasin 45+1', 71'; Mofazzol 77'	Report	Ridoy 67'

BFF Artificial Turf, Dhaka
2 October 2022
15:00

Agrani Bank Ltd. SC U-16	2–4	NoFeL Sporting Club U-16
Sajjad 35', 73'	Report	Golam 5'; Sairov 37'; Kasem 39'; Rimon 90+3'

Outer Stadium, Paltan

=== Group B ===
Pos	Team	Pld	W	D	L	GF	GA	GD	Pts	Qualification
1	Kawran Bazar PS U-16	5	4	1	0	20	4	+16	13	Knockout stage
2	Fortis FC U-16	5	3	2	0	25	3	+22	11	Knockout stage
3	AFC Uttara U-16	5	2	1	2	9	5	+4	7	
4	Gopalganj Sporting Club U-16	5	2	0	3	8	9	−1	6	
5	Farashganj SC U-16	5	1	1	3	5	18	−13	4	
6	Dhaka Wanderers U-16	5	0	1	4	4	32	−28	1	

Source: BFF

21 September 2022
15:00

Dhaka Wanderers Club U-16	0–13	Fortis FC U-16
	Report	Abu Bokkor Siddik 5', 17', 53', 87'; Monirul 15'; Nirob 19', 35', 63'; Rezaul 32'; Sakib 55'; Nazmul 61'; Hridoy 81'; Jitu 85'

BFF Artificial Turf, Dhaka
21 September 2022
15:00

Farashganj SC U-16	0–1	Azampur Football Club U-16
	Report	Mustakim 24'

Outer Stadium, Paltan

22 September 2022
15:00

Kawran Bazar Pragati Sangha U-16	2–1	Gopalganj Sporting Club U-16
Arif Hosen Sobuj 69'; Aslam 85'	Report	Shafin 2'

Outer Stadium, Paltan

24 September 2022
15:00

Kawran Bazar Pragati Sangha U-16	6–0	Farashganj SC U-16
Arif Hosen Sobuj 12', 48'; Saifur 56'; Aslam 72', 88'	Report	Abu Saiyed(OTG) 85'

BFF Artificial Turf, Dhaka

24 September 2022
15:00

Fortis FC U-16	2–0	Gopalganj Sporting Club U-16
Monirul 45+1'; Jomu 90+3'	Report

Outer Stadium, Paltan

25 September 2022
15:00

Dhaka Wanderers Club U-16	1–7	Azampur Football Club U-16
Ridoy 36'	Report	Alif 9', 82'; Sakib 25'; Sonaton 73'; Shayhan 75', 83'; Ronok 78'

BFF Artificial Turf, Dhaka

27 September 2022
15:00

Gopalganj Sporting Club U-16	2–1	Dhaka Wanderers Club U-16
Osman 37'; Prodan 61'	Report	Tarek 58'

BFF Artificial Turf, Dhaka
27 September 2022
15:00

Azampur Football Club U-16	0–1	Kawran Bazar Pragati Sangha U-16
	Report	Sahibul 75'

Outer Stadium, Paltan

28 September 2022
15:00

Fortis FC U-16	7–0	Farashganj SC U-16
Rezaul 22'; Monirul 50'; Abu Bokkor Siddik 62', 83'; Swamongshing 70', 72'; Arko 77'	Report

Outer Stadium, Paltan

30 September 2022
15:00

Farashganj SC U-16	3–2	Gopalganj Sporting Club U-16
Prias 9'; Sohan 20'; Anik 48'	Report	Shadin 54'; Roudra 73'(pen)

BFF Artificial Turf, Dhaka
30 September 2022
15:00

Fortis FC U-16	0–0	Azampur Football Club U-16
	Report

Outer Stadium, Paltan

1 October 2022
15:00

Kawran Bazar Pragati Sangha U-16	8–0	Dhaka Wanderers Club U-16
Arjun 25'; Rakib 28'; Johirul 41', 61'; Shahidul Mustafa 49', 66'; Ruhul 56'; Harun 90'	Report

Outer Stadium, Paltan

3 October 2022
15:00

Gopalganj Sporting Club U-16	3–1	Azampur Football Club U-16

BFF Artificial Turf, Dhaka
3 October 2022
15:00

Farashganj SC U-16	2–2	Dhaka Wanderers Club U-16

Outer Stadium, Paltan

4 October 2022
15:00

Fortis FC U-16	3–3	Kawran Bazar Pragati Sangha U-16
Sakib 25'; Monirul 32', 92+2'	Report	Arif Hosen Sobuj 6'; Johirul 63'; Aslam 93+3'

BFF Artificial Turf, Dhaka

== Knockout stage ==
- In the knockout stage, extra time and penalty shoot-out are used to decide the winner if necessary.

=== Bracket ===
Semi-finals
7 October–Paltan
Wari Club U-16	3
Fortis FC U-16	1
8 October–Paltan
Kawran Bazar PS U-16	2
Uttara FC U-16	0

Final
11 October–Paltan
Wari Club U-16	0
Kawran Bazar PS U-16	3

=== Semi-finals ===
7 October 2022
15:00

Wari Club U-16	3–1	Fortis FC U-16
Ahsan 3', 78'; Akash 56'	Report	Rezaul 45+4'

Outer Stadium, Paltan

8 October 2022
15:00

Kawran Bazar PS U-16	2–0	Uttara FC U-16
Arif Hosen Sobuj 90+13'; Johirul 90+18'	Report

Outer Stadium, Paltan

=== Final ===
11 December 2022
14:00

Wari Club U-16	0–3	Kawran Bazar PS U-16
	Report	Shahidul Mustafa 7', 90+8'; Arif Hosen Sobuj 62'(pen)

BSSS Mostafa Kamal Stadium, Dhaka

== Winners ==
1st BFF U-16 Football Tournament 2021–22
Winner
Kawran Bazar PS
1st Title

== Goalscorers ==
There have been 113 goals scored in 28 matches, for an average of 4.04 goals per match.

6 goals

- (Bangladesh) Abu Bokkor Siddik (Fortis FC U-16)
- (Bangladesh) Arif Hosen Sobuj (Kawran Bazar PS U-16)

5 goals

- (Bangladesh) Monirul (Fortis FC U-16)

4 goals

- (Bangladesh) Yasin (Uttara FC U-16)
- (Bangladesh) Aslam (Kawran Bazar PS U-16)
- (Bangladesh) Johirul (Kawran Bazar PS U-16)
- (Bangladesh) Rezaul (Fortis FC U-16)
- (Bangladesh) Shahidul Mustafa (Kawran Bazar PS U-16)

3 goals

- (Bangladesh) Nirob (Fortis FC U-16)
- (Bangladesh) Sajjad (Agrani Bank Ltd. SC U-16)
- (Bangladesh) Akash Islam (Wari Club U-16)
- (Bangladesh) Ahsan (Wari Club U-16)

2 goals

- (Bangladesh) Akash (Fakirerpool YMC U-16)
- (Bangladesh) Alif (AFC Uttara U-16)
- (Bangladesh) Shayhan (AFC Uttara U-16)
- (Bangladesh) Limon (Uttara FC U-16)
- (Bangladesh) Swamongshing (Fortis FC U-16)
- (Bangladesh) Sakib (Fortis FC U-16)

1 goal

- (Bangladesh) Joni (Fakirerpool YMC U-16)
- (Bangladesh) Samir (Fakirerpool YMC U-16)
- (Bangladesh) Ashraful (Fakirerpool YMC U-16)
- (Bangladesh) Jamim (Fakirerpool YMC U-16)
- (Bangladesh) Mustakim (AFC Uttara U-16)
- (Bangladesh) Nazmul (Fortis FC U-16)
- (Bangladesh) Ridoy (Fortis FC U-16)
- (Bangladesh) Jitu (Fortis FC U-16)
- (Bangladesh) Shafin (Gopalganj Sporting Club U-16)
- (Bangladesh) Tamim (Uttara FC U-16)
- (Bangladesh) Jomu (Fortis FC U-16)
- (Bangladesh) Saifur (Kawran Bazar PS U-16)
- (Bangladesh) Abu Sayed (OTG) (Farashganj SC U-16)
- (Bangladesh) Ridoy (Dhaka Wanderers U-16)
- (Bangladesh) Sakib (AFC Uttara U-16)
- (Bangladesh) Sonaton (AFC Uttara U-16)
- (Bangladesh) Ronok (AFC Uttara U-16)
- (Bangladesh) Sifar (Wari Club U-16)
- (Bangladesh) Mondol (NoFeL Sporting Club U-16)
- (Bangladesh) Osman (Gopalganj Sporting Club U-16)
- (Bangladesh) Prodan (Gopalganj Sporting Club U-16)
- (Bangladesh) Tarek (Dhaka Wanderers U-16)
- (Bangladesh) Sahibul (Kawran Bazar PS U-16)
- (Bangladesh) Arko (Fortis FC U-16)
- (Bangladesh) Billah (Wari Club U-16)
- (Bangladesh) Nurunabi (Wari Club U-16)
- (Bangladesh) Maruf (Fakirerpool YMC U-16)
- (Bangladesh) Nahidul (NoFeL Sporting Club U-16)
- (Bangladesh) Prias (Farashganj SC U-16)
- (Bangladesh) Shohan (Farashganj SC U-16)
- (Bangladesh) Anik (Farashganj SC U-16)
- (Bangladesh) Shadin (Gopalganj Sporting Club U-16)
- (Bangladesh) Roudra (Gopalganj Sporting Club U-16)
- (Bangladesh) Arjun (Kawran Bazar PS U-16)
- (Bangladesh) Rakib (Kawran Bazar PS U-16)
- (Bangladesh) Ruhul (Kawran Bazar PS U-16)
- (Bangladesh) Harun (Kawran Bazar PS U-16)
- (Bangladesh) Iqbal (Uttara FC U-16)
- (Bangladesh) Nazmul (Uttara FC U-16)
- (Bangladesh) Mofazzol (Uttara FC U-16)
- (Bangladesh) Ridoy (Fakirerpool YMC U-16)
- (Bangladesh) Golam (NoFeL Sporting Club U-16)
- (Bangladesh) Kasem (NoFeL Sporting Club U-16)
- (Bangladesh) Sairov (NoFeL Sporting Club U-16)
- (Bangladesh) Rimon (NoFeL Sporting Club U-16)

Source: BFF

== Awards ==
Award	Winner	Club
Player of the Tournament	Akash Islam	Wari Club U-16
Man of the Final	Shahidul Mustafa	Kawran Bazar PS U-16
Fair Play Trophy		Wari Club U-16

== See also ==
- BFF U-18 Football League(2021–22)
