= 2019–20 Bangladesh Championship League =

8th Season of Bangladesh Championship League

Bangladesh Championship League
- Season: 2019-20
- Dates: Cancelled

The 2019-20 Bangladesh Championship League was 8th edition of the league since its founded 2012 by the Bangladesh Football Federation (BFF). A total 13 teams would've participated in the league. The league would've commenced from 28 March 2020. On 16 March 2020, Bangladesh Football Federation suspended all competition, including this league, due to the coronavirus pandemic. On 20 May 2020, the Federation and Professional Football League Committee officially cancelled this season of the league.

Bangladesh Police FC were the defending champions.

== Venue ==
All matches were held at the BSSS Mostafa Kamal Stadium in Dhaka, Bangladesh.

Dhaka	2019–20 Bangladesh Championship League is located in Bangladesh
BSSS Mostafa Kamal Stadium	2019–20 Bangladesh Championship League is located in Bangladesh
Capacity: 25,000	2019–20 Bangladesh Championship League is located in Bangladesh

== League table ==
Pos	Team	Pld	W	D	L	GF	GA	GD	Pts	BPL
1	Agrani Bank Ltd. SC	0	0	0	0	0	0	0	0	Qualification to BPL
2	Uttara F.C.	0	0	0	0	0	0	0	0	
3	Dhaka City FC	0	0	0	0	0	0	0	0	
4	Farashganj SC	0	0	0	0	0	0	0	0	
5	Dhaka WC	0	0	0	0	0	0	0	0	
6	NoFeL Sporting Club	0	0	0	0	0	0	0	0	
7	T&T Club Motijheel	0	0	0	0	0	0	0	0	
8	Victoria SC	0	0	0	0	0	0	0	0	
9	Fakierpool YMC	0	0	0	0	0	0	0	0	
10	Wari Club	0	0	0	0	0	0	0	0	
11	Fortis SA	0	0	0	0	0	0	0	0	
12	Kawran Bazar PS	0	0	0	0	0	0	0	0	
13	Swadhinata KS	0	0	0	0	0	0	0	0	Relegation to Second Division Football League

Source: Scorebing
