= Mohammad Abu Yusuf =

Bangladeshi footballer

Abu Yusuf
Personal information
- Full name: Mohammad Abu Yusuf
- Date of birth: 11 September 1957 (age 69)
- Place of birth: Dacca, East Pakistan (present-day Dhaka, Bangladesh)
- Height: 1.68 m (5 ft 6 in)
- Position: Centre back

Senior career*
Years	Team	Apps	(Gls)
1972	Kamal SC		
1973	Fire Service AC		
1974–1980	Rahmatganj MFS		
1980–1983	Mohammedan SC		
1983–1991	Dhaka Abahani		
1991–1992	Victoria SC		
1993	Jurain Janata Club		
1994	Dhaka Abahani		

International career
1974–1975	Bangladesh U19		
1975–1987	Bangladesh		(1)

Managerial career
- 1993: Jurain Janata Club
- 1994: Dhaka Abahani (assistant)
- 1995: Mohammedan SC
- 1996: Victoria SC
- 1997: Dhaka Abahani
- 1998: Chittagong Abahani
- 1998: Bangladesh
- 1999–2002: Koshaituli SKP
- 1999–2000: Victoria SC
- 2000–2002: Chittagong Abahani
- 2002: Victoria SC
- 2000: Bangladesh U19
- 2003: Bangladesh U20
- 2004–2005: Sheikh Russel KC
- 2007: Muktijoddha Sangsad
- 2007: Bangladesh U23
- 2008: Victoria SC
- 2008: BFF Women's XI
- 2008: Bangladesh
- 2009–2010: Farashganj SC
- 2011: Feni SC
- 2012–2013: Sheikh Jamal DC
- 2014–2015: Muktijoddha Sangsad
- 2017: Farashganj SC
- 2018–2019: T&T Club Motijheel
- 2021: Wari Club
- 2022–2023: NoFeL SC
- 2024: Dhaka Wanderers
Medal record
Representing Bangladesh
South Asian Games
Silver medal – second place	1985
- * Club domestic league appearances and goals

Mohammad Abu Yusuf (Bengali: মোহাম্মদ আবু ইউসুফ; born 11 September 1957) is a Bangladeshi football coach and former player, who last served as the head coach of Bangladesh Championship League club Dhaka Wanderers.

== Early life ==
Yusuf was born on 11 September 1957, in Bakshibazar, Dhaka. His father was a religious speaker at the Bakshibazar Mosque while his mother was a stay at home parent. Yusuf is the eldest of six brothers and seven sisters, and spent much of his childhood in Kolkata, where he would become an avid fan of Kolkata Mohammedan. Back in East Pakistan, Yusuf was inspired by local players, such as Golam Sarwar Tipu and Abdul Ghafoor.

During the Bangladesh Liberation War in 1971, Yusuf supported his family financially by driving rickshaws while still studying in eight grade at the Nabakumar Institution. He started playing football through an interschool football tournament, that took place in 1972. He played as a guest footballer for the local teams from Bakshibazar, Chawk Bazar, Panchabati and Churihatta.

== Club career ==
In 1972, Mahuttuli Sporting footballer Khorshed took Yusuf to the trials for Star of Bangladesh Club who played in the Dhaka Third Division League. He failed to make the cut and was later also rejected by Mahuttuli Sporting for being too small. Eventually, the assistant coach of Fire Service AC, Bazlur Rahman, gave Yusuf the opportunity to play for Kamal Sporting in the Dhaka Second Division League. He played two games in the unfinished league. In 1973, Yusuf got a job at the Dhakeswari Cotton Mill, and with them he played a few local tournaments on a monthly salary. In 1974, a Russian coach held trials for the Bangladesh U19 team in Comilla, and Yusuf got into the final squad for the 1975 AFC Youth Championship in Kuwait.

In 1974, he made his First Division debut with Fire Service. The following year he joined Rahmatganj MFS, where he spent 6 consecutive years and even guided the club to their highest league position in 1977, when they finished runners-up to Abahani Krira Chakra. In 1980, he moved to Mohammedan SC, and became league champion in both 1980 and 1982. He was also part of the team that won the Ashis-Jabbar Shield Tournament in India, as the Black and Whites became the first Bangladeshi club to win a trophy on foreign soil. In 1981, Yusuf was operated for his injured knee in the middle of the season, which lead to his falling out with the Mohammedan officials.

In 1983, Yusuf joined Abahani Krira Chakra, with them he won a hat-trick of league titles from 1983 till 1985. He was also appointed club captain in 1986, and guided them to their third Federation Cup title. He also found success in continental level, as Abahani were runners-up in the Central Asian Zone of the 1985–86 Asian Club Championship, and champions of India's Charms Cup and Sait Nagjee Trophy, during the latter Yusuf was captain. After almost a decade at Abahani, he joined Victoria SC in 1991, and was later the coach cum player of Jurain Janata in the Second Division League. Eventually he retired in 1994, as an Abahani player.

== International career ==
After playing for the Bangladesh U19 team in the AFC Youth Championship, Yusuf made his debut for the senior international team in the 1975 Merdeka Tournament. He labelled his first tournament with the national team as "tragic" due to the 15 August 1975 Bangladeshi coup d'état. On the same day as the massacre, a below par Bangladesh team were compelled to play their last group game against South Korea, which they lost 4–0. He was recalled to the team for the 1978 Asian Games and later lost his place to Shahiduddin Ahmed Selim during the second phase of the 1980 AFC Asian Cup qualifiers held in Dhaka.

On 14 September 1979, he scored his only international goal for Bangladesh, in a 3–1 victory over Sri Lanka, in the 1979 Korea President's Cup. Yusuf started all four games in the 1980 AFC Asian Cup, and captained the national team the following year in the first President's Gold Cup. Although he was called up to the preliminary squad for the 1982 Asian Games, he was excluded from German coach Gerd Schmidt's final selection. It was suspected that Yusuf, was scapegoated for Bangladesh's poor performances in the Quaid-e-Azam International Tournament and President's Gold Cup tournaments held earlier that year.

In the 1985 South Asian Games final against India, Yusuf was one of the players who failed to convert his penalty as Bangladesh lost 1–4 in the tie-breaker. In both 1986 and 1987 he played in the President's Gold Cup with the Bangladesh Red team, which was the main national team.

== Managerial career ==
After gaining experience while coaching Jurain Sporting, Yusuf was appointed as the assistant coach of Samir Shaker at Abahani. In 1995, he was appointed as the head coach of Mohammedan SC. Yusuf, guided Mohammedan to the DMFA Cup and Federation Cup, however, was replaced by Nigerian coach Kadiri Ikhana before the league season began. Nonetheless, after losing eight points in the first four league games, Yusuf was reappointed as head coach. Mohammedan finished runners-up to Dhaka Abahani in the championship playoff, after their star players Monwar Hossain Munna and Kaiser Hamid were suffering from injuries.

In 1996 and 1999, under his coaching, Victoria SC were promoted from the First Division League to the Premier Division League. Yusuf took charge of Abahani the following year, and won the Federation Cup for the second time in his managerial career. In 1998, he managed the Bangladesh national team during two friendly matches which ended in draws against middle-eastern giants Qatar and their U23 team. He also guided Chittagong Abahani to their maiden semi-final appearance at the 2001–02 National Football League. Yusuf coached Bangladesh U19 at the 2004 AFC Youth Championship qualifiers, as his team missed out on qualification on goal difference.

On 3 October 2004, Yusuf signed a one-year contract with Sheikh Russel KC and guided them to fifth position in the league, playing in an unorthodox 5-3-2 formation. In 2007, he joined Muktijoddha SKC, which became his first Bangladesh Premier League team. However, his stay at there was cut short as Yusuf had a row with senior players, who were ignored by the coach due to lack of fitness. Yusuf later coached Bangladesh U23 at the 2008 Summer Olympics qualifiers, where his team lost 1–3 on aggregate to Hong Kong U23.

"The local forwards I have are not reliable. So, we will need both the Moroccans. I also need a good foreign defender because my present backline lacks maturity. My midfield has delivered what I needed. So, we will have to be careful about picking the third one,"

— Sheikh Russel KC coach Yusuf on his squad before the 2004–05 Dhaka Premier Division League season commenced.

"I have cut ties with this team. The officials requested me to stay at the bench in Muktijoddha's last two matches and that is why I am here"

— Muktijoddha SKC coach Yusuf on his dissatisfaction with his players

Yusuf also focused on women's football, and trained the Bangladesh Football Federation President's Eleven in 2004, and was also the coach of the unofficial Bangladesh Women's Team who played a friendly against the travelling Orissa State football team from India, in 2007. In 2008, Yusuf decided to return to Victoria SC for his fourth stint with the club, however, Victoria could not earn promotion from the Dhaka Senior Division Football League, which was then the second-tier (previously first-tier and currently the third-tier).

On 4 March 2008, Yusuf was made Bangladesh national team coach for the 2008 AFC Challenge Cup qualifiers and the 2008 SAFF Championship. Yusuf selected an inexperienced squad for the AFC Challenge Cup qualifiers, and during their opening match draw against Afghanistan, he handed debuts to three players – Mamunul Islam, Arup Kumar Baidya, Kazi Mofazzal Hossain (sent off during the game) and Maroof Ahmed. Nonetheless, the next game resulted in a (1–2) defeat to Kyrgyzstan which ended Bangladesh's qualification hopes. Later on that year at the SAFF Championship, Bangladesh produced one of their worst performances in the competition, and failed to advance past the group-stage with 2 draws and 1 loss. Yusuf resigned after the tournament, stating it was due to interference from the Bangladesh Football Federation (BFF).

"I don't want to continue because I feel the total management at the BFF does not favour any coach. I admit the failure to give the national team result(s) but I would also add that the atmosphere is not coach-friendly. I expected better from the new BFF committee but it has yet to change the tradition"

— Yusuf on his decision to resign from the Bangladesh national team

Yusuf spent the next few years managing minnows Farashganj SC and Feni SC in the Bangladesh Premier League, and he enjoyed relative success by helping them avoid relegation. On 16 February 2012, Yusuf joined Sheikh Jamal DC, and lead the club to a runners-up position in the 2012–13 Bangladesh Premier League and 2012 Federation Cup. Yusuf also finished runner-up at the 2015 Federation Cup with Muktijoddha SKC.

Yusuf was reappointed as Farashganj SC head coach in April 2017. However, midway through the 2017–18 Bangladesh Premier League, Yusuf was sacked by Farashganj, and the club eventually went onto be relegated from the top-tier. In June 2021, Yusuf took charge of Wari Club, during the second phase of the 2020–21 Bangladesh Championship League. He remained in the second-tier, managing NoFeL SC during the 2022–23 Bangladesh Championship League, before facing the sack halfway through the league season, in January 2023.

On 24 April 2024, Yusuf guided Dhaka Wanderers Club to the Bangladesh Premier League as runners-up of the 2023–24 Bangladesh Championship League. This marked the club's return to the country's top-flight after 19 years and would see them participate in the Premier League for the first time in history.

== Honours ==
=== Player ===
Mohammedan SC

- Dhaka First Division League: 1980, 1982
- Federation Cup: 1980, 1981, 1982
- Ashis-Jabbar Shield Tournament (India): 1982

Abahani Limited Dhaka

- Dhaka First Division/Premier Division League: 1983, 1984, 1985, 1989–90, 1994
- Federation Cup: 1985, 1986, 1988
- Sait Nagjee Trophy (India): 1989
- Azmiri Begum Gold Cup: 1990
- Independence Cup: 1990
- BTC Club Cup: 1991
- Charms Cup (India): 1994

=== Manager ===
Mohammedan SC

- DMFA Cup: 1995
- Federation Cup: 1995

Abahani Limited Dhaka

- Federation Cup: 1997

Koshaituli Somaj Kallyan Parishad

- Dhaka Third Division League: 1999

Victoria SC

- Dhaka First Division League: 1996, 1999

=== Awards and accolades ===
- 2000 − National Football League Best Coach Award.
- 2002− Sports Writers Association's Coach of the Year.
- 2017 − National Sports Award.
