= 2021–22 Bangladesh Championship League =

10th Professional season of Bangladesh Championship League

Bangladesh Championship League
- Season: 2021–22
- Dates: 20 February–13 June 2022
- Champions: Fortis FC; 1st title
- Promoted: Fortis FC; AFC Uttara (BPL)
- Relegated: Kawran Bazar PS; Farashganj SC
- Matches: 132
- Goals: 306 (2.32 per match)
- Top goalscorer: 18 goals (Bangladesh) Moinul Islam Moin (Uttara FC)
- Highest scoring: Uttara FC 2–5 BFF Elite Football Academy (29 March 2022)
- Longest winning run: 3 Matches; NoFeL SC
- Longest unbeaten run: 3 Matches; Fortis FC
- Longest winless run: 5 Matches; Kawran Bazar PS
- Longest losing run: 4 Matches; Agrani Bank Ltd. SC

The 2021–22 Bangladesh Championship League was the 10th season of the Bangladesh Championship League since its establishment in 2012. A total of 12 football clubs are competing in the league. The Brothers Union withdrew from the league due to the internal mismanagement and financial issue of the club. The league kicked off from 20 February and concluded on 13 June 2022.

Swadhinata KS were the champion of previous 2020–21 season.

== Team changes ==
The following teams have changed division since the previous season:

=== To BCL ===
Directly promoted

- BFF Elite Football Academy
- AFC Uttara
- Gopalganj Sporting Club

Relegated from the BPL

- Brothers Union

=== From BCL ===
Promoted to the BPL

- Swadhinata KS

Relegated to Dhaka Senior Division Football League

- Victoria SC
- Dhaka City FC

N.B: No team promoted from lower tier as the Dhaka Senior Division Football League was not held last season.

== Venue ==
All matches were played at BSSS Mostafa Kamal Stadium in Dhaka, Bangladesh.

| Dhaka | Dhaka is located in Bangladesh |
| BSSS Mostafa Kamal Stadium | Dhaka is located in Bangladesh |
| Capacity: 25,000 | Dhaka is located in Bangladesh |

=== Team locations ===
| Team | Location |
|---|---|
| Agrani Bank Ltd. SC | Dhaka |
| Azampur Football Club | Dhaka (Uttara) |
| BFF Elite Academy | Dhaka (Motijheel) |
| Gopalganj Sporting Club | Gopalganj |
| Dhaka WC | Dhaka (Motijheel) |
| Farashganj SC | Dhaka (Farashganj) |
| Fakirerpool YMC | Dhaka (Motijheel) |
| Fortis FC | Dhaka (Badda) |
| Kawran Bazar PS | Dhaka (Kawran Bazar) |
| NoFeL Sporting Club | Noakhali |
| Uttara FC | Dhaka (Uttara) |
| Wari Club | Dhaka (Motijheel) |

=== Personnel and sponsoring ===
| Team | Head coach | Captain | Kit manufacturer | Shirt sponsor (chest) |
|---|---|---|---|---|
| AFC Uttara | (Bangladesh) Monowar Hossain | (Bangladesh) Md Saddam Hossain | | |
| Agrani Bank Ltd. SC | (Bangladesh) Md Rasedul Hasan Shamim | (Bangladesh) Md Ranju Shikder | | |
| BFF Elite Football Academy | (Bangladesh) Rashed Ahmed | (Bangladesh) Parved Ahmed | | |
| Dhaka Wanderers Club | (Bangladesh) Md Ekramur Rahman | (Bangladesh) Minhaz Uddin | | |
| Uttara FC | (Bangladesh) Md Mahbub Ali Manik | (Bangladesh) Md Moinul Islam Moin | | |
| Gopalganj Sporting Club | (Bangladesh) Abdur Razzaque | (Bangladesh) Md Mujahid Hossain Mollik | | |
| Fakirerpool Young Men's Club | (Bangladesh) Md Shahdat Hossain | (Bangladesh) Md Parvez | | |
| Farashganj SC | (Bangladesh) Md Saiful Islam Chonchal | (Bangladesh) Ashim Kumar Das | | |
| Fortis FC | (Bangladesh) Sheikh Jahidur Rahman Milon | (Bangladesh) Uttam Barua | | |
| Kawran Bazar PS | (Bangladesh) Md Rezaul Haque Jamal | (Bangladesh) Mohammad Ashraf Uddin | | |
| NoFeL Sporting Club | (Bangladesh) Md Arman Hossain | (Bangladesh) Md Shamim Sheikh | | |
| Wari Club | (Bangladesh) Kamal Ahmed Babu | (Bangladesh) Sumon Kumar Das | | |

== League table ==
| Pos | Team | Pld | W | D | L | GF | GA | GD | Pts | Qualification or relegation |
|---|---|---|---|---|---|---|---|---|---|---|
| 1 | Fortis FC (C, P) | 22 | 13 | 8 | 1 | 29 | 9 | +20 | 47 | Qualification to 2022–23 BPL |
| 2 | AFC Uttara (P) | 22 | 11 | 9 | 2 | 36 | 14 | +22 | 42 | Qualification to 2022–23 BPL |
| 3 | NoFeL Sporting Club | 22 | 10 | 8 | 4 | 36 | 17 | +19 | 38 | |
| 4 | BFF Elite Academy | 22 | 9 | 4 | 9 | 24 | 20 | +4 | 31 | |
| 5 | Gopalganj Sporting Club | 22 | 8 | 7 | 7 | 20 | 20 | 0 | 31 | |
| 6 | Fakirerpool YMC | 22 | 6 | 11 | 5 | 26 | 21 | +5 | 29 | |
| 7 | Uttara FC | 22 | 7 | 6 | 9 | 33 | 40 | −7 | 27 | |
| 8 | Wari Club | 22 | 6 | 7 | 9 | 19 | 20 | −1 | 25 | |
| 9 | Dhaka Wanderers | 22 | 6 | 7 | 9 | 26 | 34 | −8 | 25 | |
| 10 | Agrani Bank Ltd. SC | 22 | 7 | 3 | 12 | 24 | 39 | −15 | 24 | |
| 11 | Farashganj SC (R) | 22 | 5 | 8 | 9 | 19 | 24 | −5 | 23 | Relegation to Senior Division Football League |
| 12 | Kawran Bazar PS (R) | 22 | 3 | 4 | 15 | 11 | 45 | −34 | 13 | Relegation to Senior Division Football League |

Source: GSA
Rules for classification: 1) Points; 2) Goal difference; 3) Goals scored;
(C) Champions; (P) Promoted; (R) Relegated

== Results ==
| Home \ Away | ABL | AFC | BEA | GSC | DWC | FSC | FYMC | FFC | KPS | NSC | UFC | WC |
|---|---|---|---|---|---|---|---|---|---|---|---|---|
| Agrani Bank Ltd. SC | — | 1–5 | 1–2 | 0–2 | 1–1 | 1–1 | 3–2 | 0–1 | 3–1 | 1–4 | 3–0 | 0–2 |
| AFC | 2–1 | — | 1–1 | 0–0 | 3–2 | 2–2 | 0–0 | 0–0 | 2–1 | 1–0 | 1–2 | 0–0 |
| BFF Elite Academy | 0–1 | 0–1 | — | 2–0 | 1–2 | 0–1 | 0–0 | 0–2 | 0–0 | 1–0 | 2–3 | 1–0 |
| Gopalganj Sporting Club | 0–1 | 2–5 | 0–2 | — | 2–1 | 2–1 | 0–0 | 0–1 | 0–0 | 0–0 | 1–2 | 1–1 |
| Dhaka Wanderers | 0–1 | 1–1 | 2–1 | 0–2 | — | 0–0 | 2–2 | 1–2 | 0–2 | 0–4 | 2–2 | 2–1 |
| Farashganj SC | 1–2 | 1–3 | 1–0 | 0–2 | 1–2 | — | 0–0 | 1–3 | 4–0 | 0–1 | 2–4 | 2–2 |
| Fakirerpool YMC | 3–0 | 0–1 | 0–2 | 0–2 | 3–0 | 1–3 | — | 0–1 | 2–1 | 0–1 | 1–1 | 2–2 |
| Fortis FC | 2–1 | 0–0 | 2–1 | 0–0 | 1–1 | 1–0 | 0–0 | — | 3–0 | 0–0 | 2–1 | 1–0 |
| Kawran Bazar PS | 0–2 | 0–3 | 1–0 | 1–2 | 1–2 | 1–0 | 1–5 | 0–5 | — | 0–0 | 0–2 | 1–0 |
| NoFeL Sporting Club | 6–0 | 0–0 | 1–2 | 1–1 | 1–1 | 1–1 | 1–2 | 2–2 | 4–1 | — | 2–1 | 4–2 |
| Uttara FC | 2–2 | 0–4 | 2–5 | 2–0 | 1–3 | 1–2 | 1–1 | 0–0 | 2–2 | 1–2 | — | 2–1 |
| Wari Club | 1–0 | 1–2 | 1–1 | 0–1 | 1–0 | 0–0 | 1–1 | 1–0 | 3–0 | 0–1 | 1–0 | — |

Source: GSA
Legend: Blue = home team win; Yellow = draw; Red = away team win.

== Positions by round ==
The following table lists the positions of teams after each week of matches. In order to preserve the chronological evolution, any postponed matches are not included to the round at which they were originally scheduled but added to the full round they were played immediately afterward.

| Team ╲ Round | 1 | 2 | 3 | 4 | 5 | 6 | 7 | 8 | 9 | 10 | 11 | 12 | 13 | 14 | 15 | 16 | 17 | 18 | 19 | 20 | 21 | 22 |
|---|---|---|---|---|---|---|---|---|---|---|---|---|---|---|---|---|---|---|---|---|---|---|
| Agrani Bank SC | 11 | 11 | 10 | 11 | 11 | 11 | 10 | 10 | 11 | 11 | 11 | 11 | 11 | 10 | 10 | 10 | 10 | 9 | 10 | 10 | 9 | 10 |
| Azampur FC | 1 | 2 | 3 | 5 | 6 | 4 | 6 | 2 | 5 | 5 | 4 | 2 | 2 | 3 | 2 | 2 | 2 | 2 | 2 | 2 | 2 | 2 |
| BFF Elite Academy | 3 | 3 | 1 | 2 | 4 | 2 | 4 | 3 | 3 | 3 | 6 | 4 | 3 | 2 | 3 | 3 | 3 | 3 | 4 | 4 | 4 | 4 |
| Gopalganj SC | 7 | 9 | 11 | 10 | 10 | 10 | 9 | 7 | 7 | 7 | 5 | 6 | 6 | 8 | 8 | 6 | 8 | 5 | 5 | 5 | 6 | 5 |
| Dhaka WC | 9 | 5 | 7 | 1 | 2 | 6 | 7 | 8 | 8 | 8 | 9 | 9 | 9 | 9 | 9 | 9 | 8 | 8 | 9 | 9 | 10 | 9 |
| Farashganj SC | 5 | 6 | 6 | 8 | 9 | 9 | 10 | 10 | 10 | 10 | 10 | 10 | 10 | 11 | 11 | 11 | 11 | 11 | 11 | 11 | 11 | 11 |
| Fakirerpool YMC | 4 | 7 | 8 | 3 | 1 | 5 | 2 | 4 | 6 | 6 | 7 | 7 | 7 | 6 | 6 | 5 | 5 | 6 | 6 | 6 | 5 | 6 |
| Fortis FC | 6 | 8 | 5 | 7 | 3 | 1 | 1 | 1 | 1 | 1 | 1 | 1 | 1 | 1 | 1 | 1 | 1 | 1 | 1 | 1 | 1 | 1 |
| Kawran Bazar PS | 12 | 12 | 12 | 12 | 12 | 12 | 12 | 12 | 12 | 12 | 12 | 12 | 12 | 12 | 12 | 12 | 12 | 12 | 12 | 12 | 12 | 12 |
| NoFeL SC | 10 | 10 | 9 | 9 | 5 | 3 | 5 | 6 | 2 | 2 | 2 | 3 | 4 | 4 | 4 | 3 | 4 | 4 | 3 | 3 | 3 | 3 |
| Uttara FC | 8 | 4 | 4 | 6 | 8 | 7 | 3 | 5 | 4 | 4 | 3 | 5 | 5 | 5 | 5 | 7 | 6 | 7 | 8 | 7 | 7 | 7 |
| Wari Club | 2 | 1 | 2 | 4 | 6 | 8 | 8 | 9 | 9 | 9 | 8 | 8 | 8 | 7 | 7 | 8 | 9 | 10 | 7 | 8 | 8 | 8 |

| Leader |
| Runners-up |
| Relegation to Dhaka Senior Division League |

Source: GSA

== Season statistics ==
=== Goalscorers ===
As of 24 April 2022

| Rank | Player | Club | Goals |
|---|---|---|---|
| 1 | (Bangladesh) Md Moinul Islam Moin | Uttara FC | 18 |
| 2 | (Bangladesh) Mirajul Islam | BFF Elite Football Academy | 10 |
| 3 | (Bangladesh) Dalim Barman | Fakirerpool Young Men's Club | 7 |
| 3 | (Bangladesh) Md Rafiqul Islam | NoFeL Sporting Club | 7 |
| 5 | (Bangladesh) Jahingir Hossain | AFC Uttara | 6 |
| 6 | (Bangladesh) Md Murad Hossain | Fakirerpool Young Men's Club | 5 |
| 6 | (Bangladesh) Md Mishu Mia | Uttara FC | 5 |
| 8 | (Bangladesh) Md Nazmul Hossain | Agrani Bank Ltd. SC | 3 |
| 8 | (Bangladesh) Moltagim alam | BFF Elite Football Academy | 3 |
| 8 | (Bangladesh) Shafin Ahmed | Wari Club | 3 |

=== Hat-tricks ===
| Player | For | Against | Result | Date | Ref |
|---|---|---|---|---|---|
| (Bangladesh) Dalim Barman | Fakirerpool Young Men's Club | Kawran Bazar PS | 5–1 | 10 March 2022 | |

=== Own goals ===
† Bold Club indicates winner of the match

| Player | Club | Opponent | Result | Date |
|---|---|---|---|---|
| (Bangladesh) Md Khokan Miah | Uttara FC | Kawran Bazar PS | 2–2 | 26 February 2022 |
| (Bangladesh) Ashim Kumar Das | Farashganj SC | Agrani Bank Ltd. SC | 1–1 | 2 March 2022 |
| (Bangladesh) Tariqul Islam | Kawran Bazar PS | Farashganj SC | 0–4 | 7 March 2022 |
| (Bangladesh) Uttam Barua | Fortis FC | NoFeL Sporting Club | 2–2 | 5 March 2022 |
| (Bangladesh) Shahriar Hossain | Dhaka Wanderers Club | Uttara FC | 3–1 | 21 April 2022 |
| (Bangladesh) Md Shanto | Agrani Bank Ltd. SC | Fakirerpool Young Men's Club | 3–2 | 11 May 2022 |
| (Bangladesh) Shaharul | Gopalganj Sporting Club | AFC Uttara | 2–5 | 21 May 2022 |
| (Bangladesh) Rana | Agrani Bank Ltd. SC | NoFeL Sporting Club | 1–4 | 1 June 2022 |

=== Discipline ===
==== Most red cards ====
As of 10 May 2022

| Rank | Player | Club | Red Cards |
|---|---|---|---|
| 1 | (Bangladesh) Md Abdullah Omar | Fortis FC | 1 |
| 1 | (Bangladesh) Parvej Ahmed | BFF Elite Football Academy | 1 |
| 1 | (Bangladesh) Md Akramul Haque | Gopalganj Sporting Club | 1 |
| 1 | (Bangladesh) Afroj Ali | NoFeL Sporting Club | 1 |
| 1 | (Bangladesh) Md Murad Hossain | Fakirerpool Young Men's Club | 1 |
| 1 | (Bangladesh) Md Roton | Agrani Bank Ltd. SC | 1 |
| 1 | (Bangladesh) Md Ripon Sheikh | Gopalganj Sporting Club | 1 |
| 1 | (Bangladesh) Showkat Mia | AFC Uttara | 1 |
| 1 | (Bangladesh) Md Shanto | Fakirerpool Young Men's Club | 1 |
| 1 | (Bangladesh) Md Rafiqul Islam | NoFeL Sporting Club | 1 |

==== Most yellow cards ====
As of 7 April 2022

| Rank | Player | Club | Yellow Cards |
|---|---|---|---|
| 1 | (Bangladesh) Md Sujon | AFC Uttara | 5 |
| 2 | (Bangladesh) Shahriar Hossain Rimon | Fakirerpool Young Men's Club | 4 |
| 2 | (Bangladesh) Md Shariful Islam | NoFeL Sporting Club | 4 |
| 3 | (Bangladesh) Md Akramul Haque | Gopalganj Sporting Club | 1 |
| 3 | (Bangladesh) Parvej Ahmed | BFF Elite Football Academy | 1 |

=== Cleansheets ===
As of 11 May 2022

| Rank | Player | Club | Clean sheets | Goals conceded |
|---|---|---|---|---|
| 1 | (Bangladesh) Uttam Barua | Fortis FC | 9 | 3 |
| 2 | (Bangladesh) Md Jihad Hasan | NoFeL Sporting Club | 7 | 7 |
| 2 | (Bangladesh) Shimul Kumar Das | NoFeL Sporting Club | 7 | 6 |
| 2 | (Bangladesh) Md Salim | Gopalganj Sporting Club | 5 | 4 |
| 2 | (Bangladesh) Md Shohanur Rahman | BFF Elite Football Academy | 5 | 10 |
| 2 | (Bangladesh) Md Shuhag Hossain | AFC Uttara | 5 | 4 |
| 2 | (Bangladesh) Md Rabiul Islam | Kawran Bazar PS | 5 | 5 |
| 4 | (Bangladesh) Ashim Kumar Das | Farashganj SC | 4 | 12 |
| 4 | (Bangladesh) Khandeker Saad | Fakirerpool Young Men's Club | 4 | 11 |
| 5 | (Bangladesh) Md Sujon Chowdhury | Wari Club | 2 | 2 |

== See also ==
- 2021–22 Bangladesh Premier League (football)
- 2021–22 Dhaka Senior Division Football League
