= 2015–16 Bangladesh Championship League =

Bangladesh Championship League
- Season: 2015–16
- Dates: 29 November 2016 – 9 January 2017
- Champions: Fakirerpool Young Men's Club
- Relegated: Chittagong Mohammedan
- Promoted: Saif Sporting Club
- Matches: 56
- Goals: 106 (1.89 per match)
- Top goalscorer: Arifur Rahman (Victoria SC) (6 goals)
- Biggest win: Victoria SC 4–0 Chittagong Mohammedan; T&T Club Motijheel 4–0 Kawran Bazar
- Highest scoring: Agrani Bank Ltd. SC 4–1 Victoria SC (5 goals)
- Longest winning run: Fakirerpool Young Men's Club; Saif Sporting Club; T&T Club Motijheel
- Longest unbeaten run: Saif Sporting Club (14 goals)
- Longest winless run: Chittagong Mohammedan (7 goals)
- Longest losing run: Chittagong Mohammedan (3 games)

The Bangladesh Championship League 2015–16 (also known as the Marcel Bangladesh Championship League 2015–16 for sponsorship reasons) was the 5th season of the Bangladesh Championship League, Bangladesh's second-tier professional football league. The league began on 29 October 2016 and ended on 9 January 2017.

== Team changes ==
A total of eight teams participated in the league with the top to being promoted to the BPL while the bottom placed would be relegated to the Dhaka Senior Division League.

=== To BCL ===
Direct entry

- Saif Sporting Club
- Kawran Bazar Pragati Sangha
- Chittagong Mohammedan SC

=== From BCL ===
Promoted to the BPL

- Uttar Baridhara Club
- Arambagh KS

Relegated to Dhaka Senior Division League

- Wari Club

N.B: No team was promoted from lower tier as the Dhaka Senior Division League was not held the previous season.

== Participating clubs ==
Team	Location
Agrani Bank Ltd. SC	Dhaka
Chittagong Mohammedan SC	Chittagong
Fakirerpool Young Men's Club	(Fakirarpool), Dhaka
Kawran Bazar Pragati Sangha	(Kawran Bazar), Dhaka
Bangladesh Police FC	Dhaka
Saif Sporting Club	Dhaka
T&T Club Motijheel	(Motijheel), Dhaka
Victoria SC	(Gendaria), Dhaka

== Venue ==
All matches will be played in the following venue.

Dhaka
Bangabandhu National Stadium
Capacity: 36,000
2015–16 Bangladesh Championship League is located in Bangladesh
Dhaka
BSSS Mostafa Kamal Stadium
Capacity: 25,000
2015–16 Bangladesh Championship League is located in Bangladesh

== Standings ==
Pos	Team	Pld	W	D	L	GF	GA	GD	Pts	Promotion or relegation
1	Fakirerpool Young Men's Club (Note: Fakirerpool Young Men's Club decided to not parrticipate in the 2017–18 Bangladesh Premier League due to fund crisis) (C)	14	7	6	1	15	8	+7	27	
2	Saif Sporting Club (P)	14	6	8	0	19	10	+9	26	Promotion to 2017–18 BPL
3	Agrani Bank Ltd. SC	14	6	2	6	13	14	−1	20	
4	Bangladesh Police FC	14	4	6	4	11	9	+2	18	
5	T&T Club Motijheel	14	4	5	5	14	14	0	17	
6	Victoria SC	14	3	5	6	14	16	−2	14	
7	Kawran Bazar	14	2	8	4	7	12	−5	14	
8	Chittagong Mohammedan (R)	14	2	4	8	13	23	−10	10	Relegation to 2018–19 Dhaka Senior Division League

Source: bff.com.bd RSSSF GSA
(C) Champions; (P) Promoted; (R) Relegated

== Season statistics ==
As of 9 January 2017

=== Top scorers ===
Rank	Player	Club	Goals
1	(Bangladesh) Arifur Rahman	Victoria SC	6
2	(Bangladesh) Zahidul Islam Dalim	Fakirerpool Young Men's Club	5
2	(Bangladesh) Matiur Munna	Agrani Bank Ltd. SC	5
2	(Bangladesh) Motin Mia	Saif Sporting Club	5
2	(Bangladesh) Md Farhad	Chittagong Mohammedan	5
6	(Bangladesh) Mohammad Jewel	Fakirerpool Young Men's Club	4
6	(Bangladesh) Rahim Uddin	Saif Sporting Club	4
6	(Bangladesh) Ariful Islam	Saif Sporting Club	4
6	(Bangladesh) Zillur Rahman	Agrani Bank Ltd. SC	4
6	(Bangladesh) Ousai Mong Marma	Chittagong Mohammedan	4
