= 2023–24 BFF U-16 Football League =

- Season: 2023–24
- Dates: 25 June–7 July 2024
- Champions: Wari Club U-16
- Matches: 10
- Goals: 22 (2.2 per match)
- Top goalscorer: (Bangladesh) Md Minarul Islam Milon (4 goals) (Wari Club U-16)
- Highest scoring: Fakirerpool YMC U-16 3–1 Uttara FC U-16 (25 June 2024)
- Longest winning run: 3 Matches; Wari Club U-16
- Longest losing run: 2 Matches; Uttara FC U-16; Fakirerpool YMC U-16

The 2023–24 BFF U-16 Football League was the second edition of the BFF U-16 Football Tournament. The Bangladesh Championship League (BCL) five clubs competed in the tournament. It was played on 25 June and ended on 7 July 2024.

Wari Club U-16 are the defending champion having won the league in 2023–24.

== Format ==
The league format is single league basic. No home/away basic. Each team face each other once.

== Venue ==
All matches were played at the BSSS Mostafa Kamal Stadium in Dhaka, Bangladesh

Dhaka	Dhaka is located in Bangladesh
BSSS Mostafa Kamal Stadium	Dhaka is located in Bangladesh
Capacity: 25,000	Dhaka is located in Bangladesh

== Teams ==
The following five teams participated in the tournament.

Team	Head coach	Captain
Dhaka Wanderers Club U-16	(Bangladesh) Md Zakir Hossain	(Bangladesh) Md Mahim Loshkar
Fakirerpool YMC U-16	(Bangladesh) Rinku Chakma	(Bangladesh) Md Rakibul Islam
PWD Sports Club U-16	(Bangladesh) Anawer Hossain	(Bangladesh) Tahsan Khan
Uttara FC U-16	(Bangladesh) Jashim Mahadi	(Bangladesh) Nahemeo Murmo Shuvo
Wari Club U-16	(Bangladesh) Md Rasidul Islam Shamim	(Bangladesh) Md Abdur Rahim

== League table ==
Pos	Team	Pld	W	D	L	GF	GA	GD	Pts	Qualification
1	Wari Club U-16	4	3	1	0	7	1	+6	10	Champion
2	Fakirerpool YMC U-16	4	2	0	2	4	4	0	6	
3	Dhaka Wanderers U-16	4	1	2	1	4	2	+2	5	
4	PWD SC U-16	4	1	1	2	2	5	−3	4	
5	Uttara FC U-16	4	1	0	3	4	9	−5	3	

Source: BFF

== Results ==
No Home\No Away	FYMC U-16	DWC U-16	UFC U-16	PWD U-16	WC U-16
Fakirerpool YMC U-16	—	1–0	3–1		0–1
Dhaka Wanderers U-16		—	3–1	0–0	
Uttara FC U-16			—	2–0	
PWD SC U-16	2–1			—	
Wari Club U-16		1–1	3–0	2–0	—

Source: BFF
Legend: Blue = left column team win; Yellow = draw; Red = top row team win.

== Positions by round ==
The following table lists the positions of teams after each week of matches. In order to preserve the chronological evolution, any postponed matches are not included to the round at which they were originally scheduled but added to the full round they were played immediately afterward.

Team ╲ Round	1	2	3	4	5
Dhaka Wanderers Club U-16	2	4	4	3	3
Fakirerpool YMC U-16	1	1	1	2	2
Uttara FC U-16	5	2	3	4	5
PWD Sports Club U-16	4	5	5	5	4
Wari Club U-16	3	3	2	1	1

Leader
Runners-up

Source: BFF

== Results by games ==
Team ╲ Round	1	2	3	4	5
Uttara FC U-16	L	W	—	L	L
Wari Club U-16	D	—	W	W	W
PWD Sports Club U-16	–	L	D	L	W
Fakirerpool YMC U-16	W	W	L	—	L
Dhaka Wanderers Club U-16	D	L	D	W	—

Source: BFF
W = Win; D = Draw; L = Lose

== Season statistics ==
There have been 22 goals scored in 10 matches, for an average of 2.2 goals per match.

4 goals

- (Bangladesh) Md Minarul Islam Milon (Wari Club U-16)

2 goals

- (Bangladesh) Robin Tripura (Fakirerpool YMC U-16)

1 goal

- (Bangladesh) Md Salman Khondokar (Fakirerpool YMC U-16)
- (Bangladesh) Soriful Islam (Fakirerpool YMC U-16)
- (Bangladesh) Abu Hasan (Uttara FC U-16)
- (Bangladesh) Md Nafiul Islam Naim (Uttara FC U-16)
- (Bangladesh) Md Sakib Khan (Dhaka Wanderers Club U-16)
- (Bangladesh) Md Munna (Wari Club U-16)
- (Bangladesh) Md Hedayat Ullah (Wari Club U-16)
- (Bangladesh) Anik Hossain (Wari Club U-16)
- (Bangladesh) Md Amit Hasan (PWD Sports Club)
- (Bangladesh) Md Jisan Mia (PWD Sports Club)
- (Bangladesh) Md Mustafizur Rahman Ratul (Fakirerpool Young Men's Club)

Source: BFF

=== Own goals ===
† Bold Club indicates winner of the match

Player	Club	Opponent	Result	Date	Ref
(Bangladesh) Md Rafiul Jannat Alvi	PWD Sports Club U-16	Uttara FC U-16	0–2	28 June 2024	

== See also ==
- 2024–25 Bangladesh Premier League
- 2023–24 BFF U-18 Football League
- 2023–24 Dhaka Senior Division League
