= 1994 Dhaka Premier Division Football League =

Dhaka Premier Division League
- Season: 1994
- Dates: 28 July – October 1994
- Champions: Dhaka Abahani
- Relegated: Bangladesh Boys; PWD
- Matches: 91
- Goals: 212 (2.33 per match)
- Top goalscorer: 12 goals Andrey Kazakov (Mohammedan)

The 1994 Dhaka Premier Division League, also known as the Star Football League due to sponsorship from BTC, was the 20th season of the top-tier football league in Bangladesh and the 2nd season of the Premier Division, following its succession from the First Division as the top-tier. A total of ten teams participated in the league which ran from 28 July to October 1994.

== Venue ==
The Dhaka Stadium in Dhaka was the main venue for the league.

Dhaka	1994 Dhaka Premier Division Football League is located in Bangladesh
Dhaka Stadium	1994 Dhaka Premier Division Football League is located in Bangladesh
Capacity: 36,000	1994 Dhaka Premier Division Football League is located in Bangladesh

== League table ==
Pos	Team	Pld	W	D	L	GF	GA	GD	Pts	Qualification or relegation
1	Dhaka Abahani (C)	18	10	8	0	33	8	+25	28	
2	Muktijoddha Sangsad	18	10	5	3	29	13	+16	25	
3	Mohammedan	18	10	5	3	27	13	+14	25	
4	Brothers Union	18	7	8	3	26	19	+7	22	
5	Wari Club	18	7	4	7	16	20	−4	18	
6	Arambagh	18	6	5	7	18	19	−1	17	
7	Agrani Bank	18	3	8	7	15	21	−6	14	
8	Fakirerpool	18	3	6	9	18	25	−7	12	Qualification for the Relegation playoff (Note: A relegation playoff match was played as the Dhaka Metropolition Football Committee did not use goal difference to differentiate positions)
9	Bangladesh Boys	18	3	6	9	18	40	−22	12	Qualification for the Relegation playoff
10	PWD (R)	18	1	5	12	11	33	−22	7	Relegation to the 1996 First Division League

Source: RSSSF
Rules for classification: 1) Points; 2) Goal difference; 3) Goals scored;
(C) Champions; (R) Relegated

== Relegation playoff ==
26 October 1994

Fakirerpool	1–0	Bangladesh Boys
Babu 78'

Dhaka Stadium

== Top scorers ==
Rank	Scorer	Club	Goals
1	(Russia) Andrey Kazakov	Mohammedan	11
2	(Bangladesh) Shahidul Ahmed Ranjan	Brothers Union	9
3	(Bangladesh) Mizanur Rahman Mizan	Muktijoddha Sangsad	7
