= Azmol Hossain Biddyut =

Bangladeshi footballer

Personal information
- Full name: Mohammed Azmol Hossain Biddyut
- Date of birth: 2 February 1981 (age 45)
- Place of birth: Narayanganj, Bangladesh
- Height: 1.65 m (5 ft 5 in)
- Position: Attacking midfielder

Team information
- Current team: Farashganj SC (head coach)

Youth career
- 1992–1995: Matuail Udayan Sangsad

Senior career*
Years	Team	Apps	(Gls)
1995–1996	Matuail Udayan Sangsad		
1996–1999	Arambagh KS		
1999–2001	Farashganj SC		
2000	→ Mohammedan SC (loan)		
2001–2003	Dhaka Abahani		
2003	Arambagh KS		
2003–2013	Muktijoddha Sangsad		
2013–2016	Feni SC		
2016–2017	Swadhinata KS		

International career
1996	Bangladesh U16		
2003	Bangladesh U23		
2003	Bangladesh	1	(0)

Managerial career
- 2017: Swadhinata KS
- 2019: Arambagh KS (assistant)
- 2022: Agrani Bank SC
- 2023: Thimphu Raven FC
- 2024: Brothers Union
- 2024: Daga United FC
- 2025–: Farashganj SC
- * Club domestic league appearances and goals

Mohammed Azmol Hossain Biddyut (Bengali: মোঃ আজমল হোসেন বিদ্যুৎ; born 2 February 1981) is a Bangladeshi professional football coach and former player, who serves as the head coach of Bangladesh Championship League club Farashganj SC.

== Early life ==
Azmol Hossain Biddyut was born on 2 February 1981 in Narayanganj, Bangladesh. Biddyut's original name given by his parents was Azmol Hossain Vidu, however, the late Narayanganj youth football coach, Mosleh Uddin Khandkar Bidyut, called him "Biddyut", which translates to lightning in Bengali. He later went onto make a name for himself as "Biddyut" while playing in the 4 feet 10 inches tournament, which is regularly held in Narayanganj.

== Club career ==
In 1993, Biddyut started his career with Matuail Udayan Sanghsad in the Pioneer Football League and later played for the team in the Dhaka Third Division League, following its promotion. He joined Arambagh KS in the Dhaka Premier Division League in 1996. Biddyut represented Mohammedan SC in the 2000 National League.

In 1999, Biddyut captained Farashganj SC and was eventually persuaded by former national team captain Monem Munna to join Abahani Limited Dhaka in 2001. In his debut season at the club, he won the Premier Division League title and also helped the club finish runners-up in the National League, the following year.

In 2003, Biddyut joined Muktijoddha Sangsad KC and spent more than a decade playing for the club. He won the Federation Cup and National League, in his first year at the club. With the Freedom Fighters, he played in the 2004 and 2005 editions of the AFC Cup. In 2013, he joined Feni SC where he remained until the club's relegation in 2016. The following year, he joined Swadhinata KS as coach cum player in the Dhaka Senior Division League.

== International career ==
Biddyut represented the Bangladesh U16 team during the qualifiers for the 1996 AFC U-16 Championship. In 2003, he participated in the 2004 Summer Olympics – Men's Asian Qualifiers. On 26 November 2003, he made his debut for the Bangladesh national team in a 0–2 defeat to Tajikistan, in the 2006 FIFA World Cup qualification – AFC first round. He was sent off on the 67th minute of the game after receiving a second yellow card within a minute of receiving his first.

== Coaching career ==
In 2017, Biddyut won the 2017 Dhaka Senior Division League as coach cum player of Swadhinata KS. In 2019, he was appointed assistant coach of Arambagh KS and later acted as head coach for 4 matches. In 2022, he was appointed head coach of relegation-threatened Agrani Bank Ltd. SC for the second phase of the 2021–22 Bangladesh Championship League. He guided the Bankers to a tenth-place finish with a point more than relegated Farashganj SC.

=== Thimpu Ravens FC ===
In July 2023, Biddyut was announced as the head coach of Thimphu Raven FC in the Bhutan Premier League after receiving his AFC 'A' Coaching License. His appointment made him the first Bangladeshi coach to manage a club in a foreign professional league. He reportedly joined with a monthly salary of 50 thousand rupees.

== Honours ==
=== Player ===
Abahani Limited Dhaka

- Dhaka Premier Division League: 2001

Muktijoddha Sangsad KC

- National League: 2003
- Federation Cup: 2003

=== Manager ===
Swadhinata KS

- Dhaka Senior Division League: 2017
