= Kamal Babu =

Bangladeshi association football player and coach

Personal information
- Full name: Kamal Ahmed Babu
- Date of birth: 8 October 1965 (age 61)
- Place of birth: Cumilla, East Pakistan (present-day Comilla, Bangladesh)
- Positions: Right-back; centre-back

Team information
- Current team: Rahmatganj MFS (head coach)

Senior career*
| Years | Team | Apps | (Gls) |
| 1984 | Mahuttuly SC | | |
| 1985 | Dhaka SC | | |
| 1986 | Dilkusha SC | | |
| 1987 | Agrani Bank SC | | |
| 1988–1993 | Wari Club | | |
| 1994 | Shantinagar Club | | |
| 1995 | BRTC SC | | |
| 1996 | Dhaka Wanderers | | |

Managerial career
- 1994–1996: Nawabpur SC
- 1996: Shantinagar Club
- 2000–2002: Wari Club
- 2002–2003: Dipali JS
- 2003: Sheikh Russel KC
- 2004–2005: Sunrise SC Dhaka
- 2005-2006: Arambagh KS
- 2007–2008: Farashganj SC
- 2008–2009: Sheikh Russel KC
- 2010: Rahmatganj MFS
- 2011: Farashganj SC
- 2012–2013: Rahmatganj MFS
- 2014–2015: Rahmatganj MFS
- Arambagh KS
- 2016: Rahmatganj MFS
- 2017: Bashundhara Kings
- 2017–2018: Rahmatganj MFS
- 2018–2019: NoFeL
- 2017–2021: Saif SC 2
- 2021: Dhaka Wanderers
- 2021–2022: Wari Club
- 2022–2023: Rahmatganj MFS
- 2024: NoFeL
- 2024: Rahmatganj MFS
- 2024: Swadhinata KS
- 2024–: Rahmatganj MFS
- * Club domestic league appearances and goals

Kamal Babu (Bengali: কামাল বাবু) is a Bangladeshi professional football coach and former player who serves as the head coach of Bangladesh Premier League club Rahmatganj MFS.
