= Askar Khan Babu =

Professional association footballer

Askar Babu
Personal information
- Full name: Askar Khan Babu
- Date of birth: 16 December 1974 (age 51)
- Place of birth: Dohazari, Munshiganj, Bangladesh
- Height: 1.80 m (5 ft 11 in)
- Positions: Attacking midfielder; striker

Youth career
- 1989–1990: Chittagong Abahani

Senior career*
Years	Team	Apps	(Gls)
1992–1996	Fakirerpool		
1997–2000	Mohammedan		
2000–2001	Farashganj		
2002	Badda Jagoroni		
2003–2004	Dhaka Abahani		

International career
1996	Bangladesh U19		
- * Club domestic league appearances and goals

Askar Khan Babu (Bengali: আসকর খান বাবু; born 16 December 1974) is a Bangladeshi football coach and former player.

== Early life ==
Askar Khan Babu was born on 16 December 1974 in Dohazari municipality of Chandanaish Upazila of Chittagong District. Askar is the fifth oldest among ten siblings, with all four of his brothers playing divisionally in both Chittagong and Dhaka. He completed his SSC from Dohazari Jamizuri A. Rahman High School in 1990, and eventually gained admission to Rangunia College. He began his football career in 1988, by playing in the Chittagong Metropolitan Youth League. He then joined Abahani Youth Team and in 1990 made his Chittagong First Division League debut with Chittagong Abahani.

== Club career ==
In Dhaka, Askar trained under Nazrul Islam Ledu, and helped Fakirerpool YMC win gain promotion to the Premier Division as champions of the 1993 First Division. In 1996–97, he participated in the Bangabandhu Gold Cup as a guest player with Dhaka Abahani.

In 1997, he joined Mohammedan SC and participated in the 1997–98 Asian Club Championship. He helped the club win the Premier Division in 1999 and also the All Airlines Gold Cup in India the same year. Askar was also part of the team at the 2000 National League. In 2001, Askar captained Farashganj SC, and eventually moved to Badda Jagoroni Sangsad the following year. He retired after playing in the 2003–04 Premier Division League with Dhaka Abahani.

== International career ==
In 1996, he was kept standby in the Bangladesh national team prior to the 4-nation Tiger Trophy, however, he was not included in the final squad by coach Otto Pfister. He was called up to the national team for the 1997 SAFF Gold Cup, which he missed after tearing his ligament while playing a league match against Arambagh KS. Askar was part of the Bangladesh U19 team at the 1996 AFC Youth Championship.

== Coaching career ==
Following his retirement, he became a coach at the Dohazari Abahani Football Academy.

== Career statistics ==
=== International goals ===
#	Date	Venue	Opponent	Score	Result	Competition
1.	29 July 1996	National Stadium, Malé, Maldives	Maldives		5–0	1996 AFC Youth Championship qualifiers

== Honours ==
Fakirerpool YMC

- Dhaka First Division League: 1993

Mohammedan SC

- Dhaka Premier Division League: 1999
- All Airlines Gold Cup: 1999
