= Fortis FC =

Bangladeshi Association football club

Fortis
- Full name: Fortis Football Club Limited
- Nickname: The Fortis Warriors
- Founded: 2020; 6 years ago
- Stadium: Bashundhara Kings Arena
- Capacity: 15,000
- Owner: Fortis Group
- President: Shahin Hasan
- Head Coach: Masud Parvez Kaisar
- League: Bangladesh Football League
- 2025–26: Bangladesh Premier League, 3rd of 10
- Website: fortisfc.org
| Home colours | Away colours |

Fortis Football Club (Bengali: ফর্টিস ফুটবল ক্লাব) is a Bangladeshi professional football club based in Badda, Dhaka. They compete in the Bangladesh Football League, the top flight of Bangladesh football, having gained promotion as the 2021–22 Bangladesh Championship League winners.

Despite being based in Dhaka, the club gives priority to players from Chittagong Division as majority of its owners are from the port city. The club also runs the Fortis Academy Team, which competes in the Bangladesh Championship League.

== History ==
=== Establishment ===
In 2020, Fortis Group established Fortis Sports Academy Limited as part of their football development project, the club president Shahin Hasan stated that the club's main purpose is to establish academies all around the country in order to create a pipeline of future international players. Before its league journey set about, the club established the Fortis Football Academy. On 4 February 2020, Bangladesh Football Federation gave the green signal for the club to directly enter professional football through the Bangladesh Championship League, without having to play through the semi-professional lower divisions in Dhaka.

=== Championship era ===
Fortis Sporting Academy was originally slated to embark on their domestic league journey from the 2019–20 Bangladesh Championship League season. However, after the COVID-19 pandemic resulted in the cancellation of domestic football, they were compelled to postpone their long-awaited league debut for an additional year. Before the start of the 2020–21 league season, the club under the name Fortis FC had completed the signings of ten players with Premier League experience. Notable among them were Khan Mohammad Tara, Uttam Barua and former national team striker Towhidul Alam Towhid. They also appointed Akbor Hossain Ridon as head-coach. On 8 February 2021, Fortis began their professional league journey as they drew 0–0 against Farashganj SC in the opening day of the new league season. On 1 March 2021, the club registered their first victory, by defeating Dhaka Wanderers 3–2 as, striker Mohammad Hasanuzzaman registered the club's first professional league goal. During their debut season, Fortis finished in third place and were only 2 points off from the top spot.

Before the start of the 2021–22 Championship League, president Shahin Hasan informed that the club recruited players from the then ongoing Chittagong Football League, and only retained 15 players from their previous campaign. Jahidur Rahman Milon was appointed as the new head coach and former senior national team defender Atiqur Rahman Meshu was added to the club's coaching staff as an assistant coach. On 24 April 2022, Fortis recorded a goalless draw against newcomers Azampur FC, which meant that the club were unbeaten in their previous 31 league games. On 1 June 2022, Fortis secured promotion to the Bangladesh Premier League with two games to go, thrashing Kawran Bazar 5–0, with forward Mohammad Hasanuzzaman scoring a hattrick. Fortis finished the league season with the least goals conceded, and veteran keeper Uttam Barua topped the cleansheet charts.

=== Premier League era ===
On 19 March 2022, Fortis initiated their former 2022–23 Bangladesh Premier League campaign with a 1–1 draw against the reigning league runners-up Dhaka Abahani.

== Shirt sponsors ==
| Period | Shirt sponsor |
|---|---|
| 2021–2022 | Sarah Resort |
| 2022– | TORR |

== Players ==
=== First-team squad ===
As of 6 September 2026

Note: Flags indicate national team as defined under FIFA eligibility rules; some limited exceptions apply. Players may hold more than one non-FIFA nationality.

| No. | Pos. | Nation | Player |
|---|---|---|---|
| 1 | GK | SRI | Sujan Perera |
| 2 | DF | BAN | Md Rasel Hossain |
| 3 | DF | BAN | Md Mithu Chowdhury |
| 4 | MF | GAM | Essa Jallow |
| 5 | DF | BAN | Monjurur Rahman Manik |
| 6 | DF | BAN | Santo Tudu |
| 7 | FW | BAN | Md Murshed Ali |
| 8 | MF | NEP | Arik Bista |
| 9 | FW | NGR | Stephen Chukwude |
| 10 | FW | GAM | Pa Omar Babou (captain) |
| 11 | FW | BAN | Shakhawat Hossain Rony |
| 12 | DF | BAN | Sani Das |
| 13 | MF | BAN | Atiqur Rahman Fahad |
| 14 | MF | BAN | Md Sharif |
| 15 | MF | BAN | Md Emon Babu Jibon |
| 17 | MF | BAN | Md Shofiq Rahman |

| No. | Pos. | Nation | Player |
|---|---|---|---|
| 19 | FW | BAN | Mohammad Ibrahim |
| 20 | FW | BAN | Rafayel Tudu |
| 21 | MF | BAN | Md Insan Hossain |
| 22 | GK | BAN | Saiful Islam |
| 23 | DF | BAN | Monir Alam |
| 24 | DF | BAN | Sheikh Sangram |
| 25 | GK | BAN | Md Mehedi Islam Rabbani |
| 26 | MF | BAN | Md Ariful Islam |
| 27 | DF | BAN | Md Shahin |
| 28 | MF | BAN | Rejuan Ali |
| 29 | FW | BAN | Md Rana Ahammed |
| 30 | GK | BAN | Md Atick Hasan Sourov |
| 35 | FW | BAN | Md Abu Sayed |
| 44 | DF | NEP | Ananta Tamang |
| 38 | FW | BAN | Shuki Itofusa |
| 73 | FW | JPN | Noriki Akada |

=== Other players under contract ===
As of 6 September 2026

Note: Flags indicate national team as defined under FIFA eligibility rules; some limited exceptions apply. Players may hold more than one non-FIFA nationality.

| No. | Pos. | Nation | Player |
|---|---|---|---|
| — | DF | JPN | Shian Kawasaki |
| — | MF | JPN | Yusei Shimomura |

== Personnel ==
=== Current technical staff ===
As of 24 September 2025

| Position | Name |
|---|---|
| Head coach | (Bangladesh) Masud Parvez Kaisar |
| Team leader | (Bangladesh) Md Shahin Hasan |
| Assistant coach | (Bangladesh) Touhidul Islam Siddique |
| Team manager | (Bangladesh) Rashedul Islam |
| Interpreter | (Bangladesh) Uttam Kumar Barua |
| Physiotherapist | (Bangladesh) Asiful Alam |
| Media manager | (Bangladesh) Didarul Haque |
| Academy coach | (Bangladesh) Jashim Mahadi |
| Kit Manager | (Bangladesh) Md Sakib |
| Masseur | (Bangladesh) Md Roby |

== Team records ==
=== Head coaches' record ===
As of 11 August 2026

| Coach | From | To | P | W | D | L | GS | GA | %W |
|---|---|---|---|---|---|---|---|---|---|
| (Bangladesh) Akbor Hossain Ridon | January 2021 | July 2021 | 22 | 12 | 7 | 3 | 43 | 18 | 54.55 |
| (Bangladesh) Sheikh Zahidur Rahman Milon | January 2022 | 13 June 2022 | 22 | 13 | 8 | 1 | 29 | 9 | 59.09 |
| (Bangladesh) Masud Parvez Kaisar | 20 September 2022 | Present | 93 | 33 | 33 | 27 | 121 | 93 | 35.48 |

P – Total of played matches W – Won matches D – Drawn matches L – Lost matches GS – Goals scored GA – Goals against
%W – Percentage of matches won

== Management ==
=== Board of directors ===
As of 25 January 2023

| Position | Name |
|---|---|
| President | (Bangladesh) Md Shahin Hasan |
| Managing director | (Bangladesh) Shahadat Hossain |
| Media Officer | (Bangladesh) Mohammad Moinul Hossain |
| Marketing Officer | (Bangladesh) Mohammad Ziaur Rahman Shakib |
| Administration Manager | (Bangladesh) Abdul Mannan Shamim |

== Competitive record ==
| Season | Division | League | | | | | | | | Federation Cup | Independence Cup | Top league scorer(s) | |
| Season | Division | P | W | D | L | GF | GA | Pts | Position | Federation Cup | Independence Cup | Player | Goals |
|---|---|---|---|---|---|---|---|---|---|---|---|---|---|
| 2020–21 | BCL | 22 | 12 | 7 | 3 | 40 | 17 | 43 | 3rd | — | — | (Bangladesh) Zillur Rahman | 12 |
| 2021–22 | BCL | 22 | 13 | 8 | 1 | 29 | 9 | 47 | Champions | — | — | (Bangladesh) Jakir Hossain Ziku | — |
| 2022–23 | BPL | 20 | 5 | 8 | 7 | 23 | 25 | 23 | 7th | GS | GS | (The Gambia) Gaira Joof | 5 |
| 2023–24 | BPL | 18 | 6 | 6 | 6 | 21 | 23 | 24 | 5th | QF | GS | (The Gambia) Pa Omar Babou | 6 |
| 2024–25 | BPL | 18 | 6 | 9 | 3 | 24 | 15 | 27 | 6th | GS | — | (The Gambia) Pa Omar Babou | 8 |
| 2025–26 | BFL | 18 | 10 | 5 | 3 | 31 | 13 | 35 | 3rd | GS | — | (The Gambia) Pa Omar Babou | 13 |

| Champions | Runners-up | Third place | Promoted | Relegated |

== Honours ==
| Type | Competitions | Titles | Seasons |
|---|---|---|---|
| Domestic | Bangladesh Championship League | 1 | 2021–22 |

== Performance in AFC competitions ==
- AFC Challenge League

2026–27: Group stage

| Season | Competition | Round | Club | Home | Away |
|---|---|---|---|---|---|
| 2026–27 | AFC Challenge League | Preliminary stage | (Kyrgyzstan) Muras United | 1–0 | —N/a |
| 2026–27 | AFC Challenge League | Group C, 2nd of 4 | (India) Goa | 1–2 | |
| 2026–27 | AFC Challenge League | Group C, 2nd of 4 | (Kuwait) Al-Qadsia | 0–3 | |
| 2026–27 | AFC Challenge League | Group C, 2nd of 4 | (Tajikistan) Regar-TadAZ | 3–1 | |

== Notable players ==
The players below had senior international cap(s) for their respective countries. Players whose name is listed, represented their countries before or after playing for Fortis FC.

Asia

- (Afghanistan) Amredin Sharifi (2022–2023)
- (Nepal) Anjan Bista (2024)
- (Sri Lanka) Sujan Perera (2025–)
- (Nepal) Ananta Tamang (2025–)
- (Nigeria) Onyekachi Okafor (2025–2026)
