= Kazi Mofazzal Hossain Shaikat =

Bangladeshi footballer

Mofazzal Hossain
Personal information
- Full name: Kazi Mofazzal Hossain Shaikat
- Date of birth: 20 June 1986 (age 40)
- Place of birth: Noakhali, Bangladesh
- Height: 1.86 m (6 ft 1 in)
- Position: Centre back

Senior career*
Years	Team	Apps	(Gls)
2004–2006	Fakirerpool YMC		
2007–2008	Chittagong Mohammedan		
2008–2010	Dhaka Mohammedan		
2010–2013	Muktijoddha Sangsad		
2013–2014	Dhaka Abahani		
2015–2016	Chittagong Abahani		

International career
2008	Bangladesh	5	(0)
- * Club domestic league appearances and goals

Kazi Mofazzal Hossain Shaikat (Bengali: কাজী মোফাজ্জল হোসেন সৈকত; born 20 June 1986) is a retired Bangladeshi professional footballer who played as a centre back.

== International career ==
Shaikat was sent off on his international debut against Afghanistan, after picking up a double booking during their 2008 AFC Challenge Cup qualification match. He also represented the team at the 2008 SAFF Championship in Sri Lanka. On 23 July 2009, During Dido's reign as the Bangladesh national team head coach, Shaikat along with seven other players walked out of the national team camp after terming the coach's training to be unbearable, this led to the coach requesting the Bangladesh Football Federation for the particular players to be dismissed. The BFF president Kazi Salahuddin, had to intervene to solve the situation, which resulted in all Mofazzal and the 8 other players being fined a month's salary. Soon after the incident Dido resigned after a fallout with the national team management committee. Shaikat's international career also ended that year, as he failed to make the squad for the 2009 SAFF Championship.

== Honours ==
Mohammedan SC

- Federation Cup: 2008, 2009
- Super Cup: 2009
