= Rashedul Islam =

Bangladeshi footballer (born 1992)

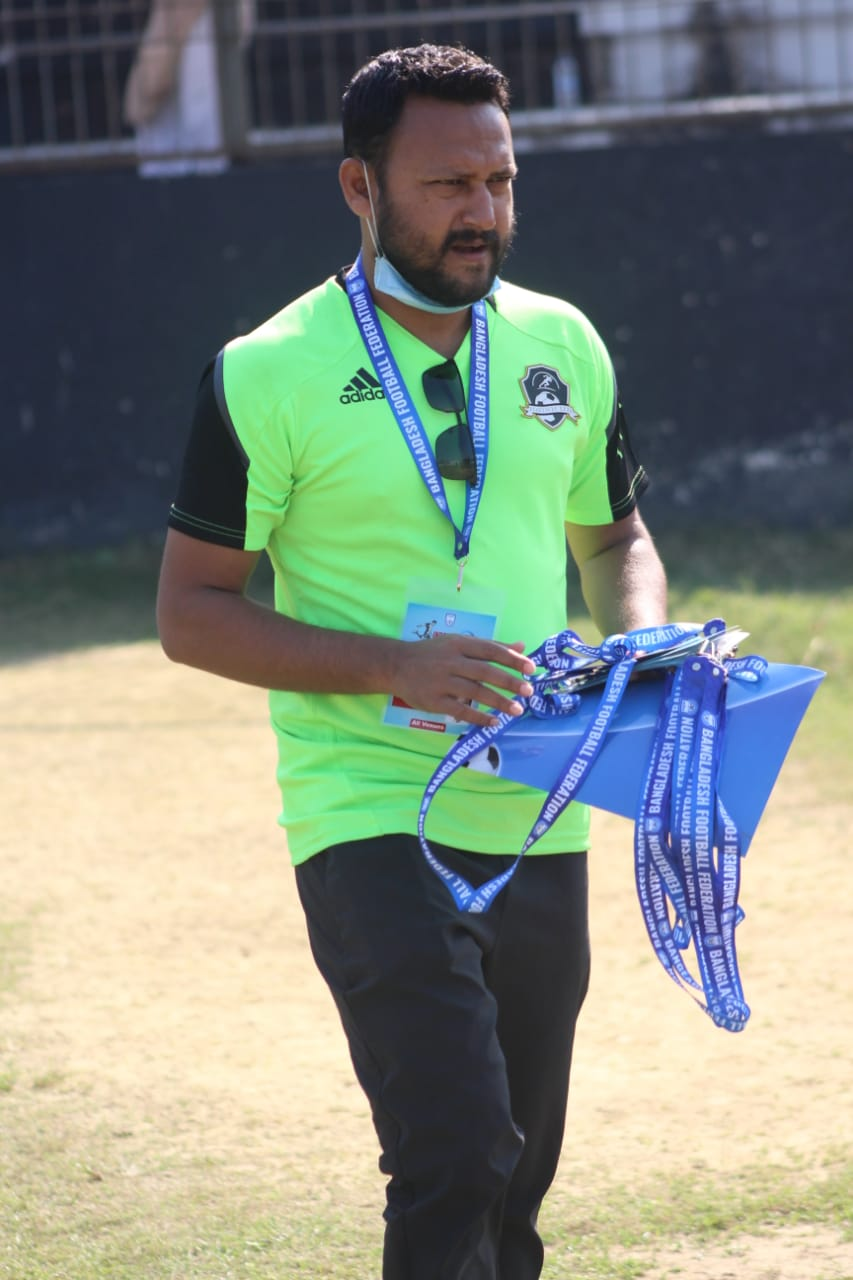
- Rashedul with Fortis FC in 2022

Personal information
- Full name: Md Rashedul Islam
- Date of birth: 6 June 1992 (age 34)
- Place of birth: Faridpur, Bangladesh
- Height: 1.70 m (5 ft 7 in)
- Position: Defender

Team information
- Current team: Fortis FC (Team manager)

Youth career
- BKSP

Senior career*
| Years | Team | Apps | (Gls) |
| 2008–2010 | Muktijoddha Sangsad | | |
| 2010–2011 | Feni SC | | |
| 2011–2013 | Brothers Union | | |
| 2013–2014 | Victoria SC | | |

International career^{‡}
| 2006 | Bangladesh U17 | | |
| 2008–2009 | Bangladesh | 1 | (0) |
- * Club domestic league appearances and goals as of 02 August 2022 ‡ National team caps and goals as of 02 August 2022

Md Rashedul Islam (born 6 June 1992) is a former Bangladeshi footballer and sports journalist, who is currently serving as the team manager of Bangladesh Premier League club Fortis FC as well as an assistant coach of the club's youth setup. A player of wide range, he used to play as a right back in his playing career.

He was part of Bangladesh national team in 2010 AFC Challenge Cup qualification, when he won his only cap for the national team. He represented the Bangladesh under-17 side in 2006 AFC U-17 Championship.

After his early retirement as a footballer, Rashedul started his career with The Daily Samakal as a sports journalist. Later, he went on to join Prothom Alo where he won several awards for his works in sports journalism. In 2022, alongside his journalism career, Rashedul returned to football as he joined newly promoted top-tier club Fortis FC.

== International career ==
In 2006, Rashedul Islam played for Bangladesh under-17 team in 2006 AFC U-17 Championship held in Singapore.

On 30 April 2009, Rashedul made his senior team debut in a 3–0 win against Macau in 2010 AFC Challenge Cup qualification under Brazilian coach Dido.
