= AFC Uttara =

Association football club in Bangladesh

- Full name: Azampur Football Club Uttara
- Nickname: AFCU
- Founded: 2009
- Ground: Rafiq Uddin Bhuiyan Stadium
- Capacity: 25,000
- President: Saidur Rahman Manik
- Head Coach: Vacant
- League: Bangladesh Championship League
- 2022–23: Premier League, 11th of 11 (Relegated)
Home colours	Away colours

Azampur Football Club Uttara (Bengali: আজমপুর ফুটবল ক্লাব উত্তরা), commonly known as AFC Uttara, is an association football club based in Azampur, Uttara, a suburb of Dhaka, Bangladesh. The club plays in the Bangladesh Championship League, the second level of Bangladeshi football league system.

== History ==
=== Formation and early years ===
In 2009, Azampur Club was built next to the Azampur railway line by renting the land owned by Bangladesh Railway. The club is located at the end of Road No. 19, Sector 4, Uttara. Local businessmen Shahidur Rahman Manik and Md Shahadat Hossain were respectively named the club's president and secretary. The club remained relatively inactive on the domestic football scene during the first decade since inception and first took part in the Pioneer Football League in 2013, without finding much success.

Azampur were given automatic promotion to the fourth-tier after completing the required club licensing and participated in the 2018–19 Dhaka Second Division League. Although they failed to finish within the top three spots required for promotion to the third-tier, the Dhaka Senior Division League, the club were granted entry to the Bangladesh Championship League, the country's second-tier.

The club's badge, an inspiration of the badge of the club AFC Bournemouth, with a change in colour from black to green.

=== Match-fixing allegations and promotion ===
In preparation for the 2021–22 Bangladesh Championship League, the club appointed former Bangladesh national team forward Saifur Rahman Moni, as the head coach. Although the club were given direct entry to the second-tier due to their facilities, it was later reported that the club house had inhumane living standards, with 15 and 14 beds in two rooms, used to accommodate 25 players. Azampur's inaugural match in the BCL, ended with a 3–0 victory over Kawran Bazar PS.

On 27 March 2022, Saifur Rahman Moni resigned from head coach duty, and imposed match-fixing allegations against the club. Moni stated that his last two games with the club, against Uttara FC (1–2) and Farashganj SC (3–1) were predetermined. After the allegations were made public, a player anonymously interviewed by Prothom Alo, admitted to the game being fixed, while Muktijoddha SKC midfielder Salahuddin Rubel, was also rumored to be involved. The club's players also accused Salahuddin Rubel of entering the clubhouse frequently without permission. When questioned about his frequent visits, Salahuddin stated that he had been asked to take care of club activities by the club president, Saidur Rahman Manik.

Amdist the allegations Monowar Hossain Moyna, who was appointed from matchday nine of the league season, guided the club to promotion to the Bangladesh Premier League. After almost 5 months of investigating, the Bangladesh Football Federation concluded that the club had not taken part in any fixed matches, thus allowing them entry to the 2022–23 Bangladesh Premier League.

== Current squad ==
As of 27 March 2023

Note: Flags indicate national team as defined under FIFA eligibility rules; some limited exceptions apply. Players may hold more than one non-FIFA nationality.

No.	Pos.	Nation	Player
1	GK	BAN	Jahid Hasan Rabbi
3	DF	BAN	Jintu Mia
4	DF	BAN	Istekharul Alam Shakil (captain)
6	MF	BAN	Anik Ghosh
7	MF	BAN	Shah Alamgir Anik
8	MF	BAN	Mohammed Abdullah Tofel
10	FW	BAN	Sarower Zaman Nipu
11	FW	BAN	Fahim Uddin Sohel
12	MF	BAN	Fahim Ahmed
13	DF	BAN	Rakib Sarkar
14	MF	BAN	Salauddin Rubel
15	FW	BAN	Mehebub Hasan Noyon
16	DF	BAN	Sajon Mia
17	FW	BAN	Mujahid Hossain Joy
18	MF	BAN	Jabed Ahmed
19	DF	BAN	Arman Sadi
20	FW	BAN	Naim Uddin Noyon

No.	Pos.	Nation	Player
21	MF	KGZ	Sultanbek Momunov
22	GK	BAN	Mohammed Azad Hossen
23	MF	BAN	Mohamed Masum Mia
24	DF	BAN	Zahidul Islam Babu
25	GK	BAN	Kamal Hossain Titu
26	DF	BAN	Khorshed Alam
27	DF	BAN	Mohamed Sagor Miah
29	MF	BAN	Hridoy Hossain
30	GK	BAN	Mohammad Razib
33	DF	GUI	Younoussa Camara
65	MF	BAN	Sajib Mia
66	DF	BAN	Mazid Munshi
70	MF	BAN	Rohit Sarkar
77	MF	BAN	Mohammad Shahariar Bappy
88	FW	BAN	Sakib Bepari
98	FW	COL	Richard Maturana
99	FW	RUS	Alan Koroyev

== Personnel ==
=== Current technical staff ===
As of 7 November 2022

Position	Name
Head coach	Vacant
Assistant coach	Vacant

=== Club officials ===
As of January 2022

Position	Name
President	(Bangladesh) Saidur Rahman Manik
Vice president	(Bangladesh) D.M. Shamim

== Coaching record ==
As of 21 July 2023

Head Coach	From	To	P	W	D	L	GF	GA	%W
(Bangladesh) Saifur Rahman Moni	February 2022	27 March 2022	8	3	4	1	10	4	37.50
(Bangladesh) Monowar Hossain Moyna	28 March 2022	20 June 2022	14	8	5	1	24	10	57.14
(Bangladesh) Ali Asgar Nasir	November 2022	22 July 2023	26	0	5	21	13	76	0.00
