= NoFeL SC =

Bangladeshi football club

NoFeL Sporting Club
- Full name: Noakhali Feni Laxmipur Sporting Club
- Nickname: Amra Nofel Bahini
- Founded: April 2017; 9 years ago
- Ground: Shaheed Bulu Stadium
- Capacity: 7,000
- President: Tabith Awal
- Head Coach: Md Mohi Uddin
- League: Dhaka Senior Division League
- 2025–26: 8th of 17
| Home colours | Away colours |

NoFeL Sporting Club (Bengali: নোফেল স্পোর্টিং ক্লাব) is a football team of Bangladesh, based in Noakhali. The current name NoFeL is an acronym for Noakhali, Feni & Lakhsmipur, which are the three districts the club represents. The club competes in the Dhaka Senior Division League, the third-tier of Bangladeshi football.

Nofel played in the Bangladesh Premier League, the country's top tier association football league, for the first time in the 2018-2019 season after being runners-up of 2017 Bangladesh Championship League. However, they suffered relegation in the same season.

== History ==
=== Establishment & promotion ===
On 9 April 2017, NoFeL SC announced 21-member executive committee with BFF vice-president Tabith M Awal as its president. Apart from Noakhali, many people from Feni and Lakhsmipur also contributed during the clubs inception. Shakhawat Hossain Shahin, also the manager of Feni SC, was named as the general secretary. During their formation, the clubs officials announced that their main goal is to produce a variety talented footballers who can serve the national team in future. NoFel SC started its journey by taking part in the second-tier professional league during the 2017 Bangladesh Championship League.

The club appointed Mohidur Rahman as their head coach for their first season. Former Feni SC striker, Akbor Hossain Ridon was named captain of the club for the inaugural season. On 6 August 2017, in the opening match of 2017 Bangladesh Championship League the club played their first official game where they were victorious by 2–0 margin against neighbors Feni SC. Ariful Islam scored the first ever goal for the club. On 14 October 2017, Ariful Islam scored first ever hat-trick for the club where his team was victorious by 5–1 margin against Bashundhara Kings. 9 days later on 23 October 2017, Ariful Islam scored his second hat-trick of the season and lead his team to a destructive 7–2 victory over Kawran Bazar Pragati Sangha.

NofeL, who needed a single point from the last two matches to ensure their top-tier berth, On 5 November 2017 they not only secured all three points against Uttar Baridhara SC but also confirmed the runners-up trophy in their debut appearance after Bashundhara Kings confirmed the title a day before. Sazzad Zaman struck the all-important goal for the club. Ariful Islam was the highest goal scorer of the tournament with 12 goals.

=== Premier league era & relegation ===
In October 2018, the club appointed the experienced Kamal Babu as the team's head coach for their inaugural top flight campaign. On 6 December 2018, NofeL tested their maiden victory in top-tier football against local giant Mohammedan SC by 2–0 margin during 2018 Independence Cup. Nevertheless, they were not able to advance past the group stages of either domestic cup competitions, as they failed to win a single game during the 2018 Federation Cup. Before the start of the league, the players were not able to practice long term due to internal problems. Nofel held their residential camp at the Wari Club, in Motijheel. The officials hired only four rooms at Wari Club for the accommodation of 30 players of the squad and the club also failed to meet at least 30% of the total criterion of the 2017 BFF club licensing. The team were also unable afford an Asian quota player, and only managed 3 foreign recruits.

On 18 January 2019, Nofel started their 2018–19 Bangladesh Premier League with a 2–1 defeat at the hands of defending champions Dhaka Abahani, defender Kamrul Islam scored the clubs first premier league goal. After only earning two points from their first seven games, Nofel finally tasted their first league win, defeating Brothers Union 2–0, on 23 February 2019. The newly promoted side surprised many when they defeated league veterans Rahmatganj MFS with a 5–2 margin. Nofel's most notable victory in their short history came, when they defeated Mohammedan SC 1–0, on 4 March 2019, and the game club captain Akbar Hossain Ridon announced his retirement. However, they could not sustain their good form, and with 5 straight losses starting from July 2019, Nofel were relegated, despite coming from behind to hold Sheikh Jamal DC to a 2–2 draw in their last league match. Although the team were relegated, they produced numerous young talents throughout the season, with the likes of Khandokar Ashraful Islam, Jamir Uddin, Farhad Mona and Kamrul Islam all securing premier league clubs for the following season.

After dropping down to the championship, Monwar Hossain Moyna was given the duty of getting the club back into the top tier. However, he failed to do so as Nofel finished second in the 2020–21 Bangladesh Championship League, only a point behind winners Swadhinata KS, and due to COVID-19 circumstances only the league winners were granted promotion.

== Home venue ==
From the 2018-2019 season, NoFeL Sporting Club and Team BJMC shared Shaheed Bulu Stadium of Noakhali District as their home venue.

== Sponsors ==
| Period | Kit manufacturer | Shirt sponsor |
|---|---|---|
| 2017 | None | |
| 2018–present | None | SAIF Power Battery |

== Crest and colours ==
Old club crest used during 2017–2020.

== Current squad ==
As of 28 October 2025

Note: Flags indicate national team as defined under FIFA eligibility rules; some limited exceptions apply. Players may hold more than one non-FIFA nationality.

| No. | Pos. | Nation | Player |
|---|---|---|---|
| 1 | GK | BAN | Md Jasim Uddin |
| 2 | DF | BAN | Md Khorshed Alam |
| 3 | DF | BAN | Zahidul Islam |
| 4 | DF | BAN | Nazim Uddin Mithu |
| 5 | DF | BAN | Aminul Islam |
| 6 | MF | BAN | Md Tariqul Islam |
| 7 | MF | BAN | Md Faizullah |
| 8 | MF | BAN | Md Robel |
| 9 | FW | BAN | Md Mujahid Hossain Mollik |
| 10 | FW | BAN | Md Mahid Sheikh |
| 11 | MF | BAN | Md Manzurul Karim |
| 12 | FW | BAN | Sobuj Sheikh |
| 13 | FW | BAN | Md Afjal Hossain |
| 14 | DF | BAN | Rabiul Alam |
| 15 | DF | BAN | Manik Molla |

| No. | Pos. | Nation | Player |
|---|---|---|---|
| 16 | FW | BAN | Md Saiful Islam |
| 17 | FW | BAN | Jakir Hossain |
| 18 | DF | BAN | Atikur Rahman |
| 19 | FW | BAN | Md Sagor |
| 20 | FW | BAN | Md Mynul Islam Mamun |
| 21 | MF | BAN | Redowan Hasan Lingkon |
| 22 | DF | BAN | Ashibul Hossain |
| 23 | FW | BAN | Zaker Hossain |
| 24 | MF | BAN | Asif Akbar |
| 25 | MF | BAN | Al-Amin Hassan Aanaf |
| 26 | MF | BAN | Md Ahad Ali |
| 27 | MF | BAN | Md Sajib |
| 28 | DF | BAN | Md Abdur Rahman |
| 29 | MF | BAN | Starling Lang Bang |
| 30 | GK | BAN | Md Razib (Captain) |

== Coaching staff ==
=== Coaches ===
- (Bangladesh) Mohidur Rahman (August 2017 – September 2018)
- (Bangladesh) Kamal Babu (October 2018 – August 2019)
- (Bangladesh) Akbor Hossain Ridon (September 2019 – December 2020)
- (Bangladesh) Monwar Hossain Moyna (January 2021 – June 2022)
- (Bangladesh) Mohammad Abu Yusuf (December 2022 – January 2023)
- (Bangladesh) Arman Hossain (February 2022 – June 2022)
- (Bangladesh) Jahangir Alam (January 2023 – April 2023)
- (Bangladesh) Kamal Babu (February 2024 – April 2024)

=== Managerial statistics ===
As of 18 January 2026

| Coach | From | To | P | W | D | L | GS | GA | %W |
|---|---|---|---|---|---|---|---|---|---|
| (Bangladesh) Mohidur Rahman | August 2017 | October 2018 | 18 | 8 | 8 | 2 | 26 | 12 | 44.44 |
| (Bangladesh) Kamal Babu | October 2018 | August 2019 | 24 | 5 | 5 | 14 | 24 | 42 | 20.83 |
| (Bangladesh) Akbor Hossain Ridon | September 2019 | December 2020 | 0 | 0 | 0 | 0 | 0 | 0 | — |
| (Bangladesh) Monwar Hossain Moyna | 10 January 2021 | February 2022 | 22 | 13 | 5 | 4 | 34 | 9 | 59.09 |
| (Bangladesh) Arman Hossain | 8 February 2022 | 13 June 2022 | 22 | 10 | 8 | 4 | 36 | 17 | 45.45 |
| (Bangladesh) Mohammad Abu Yusuf | 21 December 2022 | 28 January 2023 | 8 | 2 | 4 | 2 | 8 | 10 | 25.00 |
| (Bangladesh) Jahangir Alam | 28 January 2023 | 19 April 2023 | 12 | 4 | 3 | 5 | 18 | 15 | 33.33 |
| (Bangladesh) Kamal Babu | 9 February 2024 | 24 April 2024 | 14 | 3 | 8 | 3 | 9 | 11 | 21.43 |
| (Bangladesh) Md Mohi Uddin | 1 September 2025 | Present | 16 | 4 | 7 | 5 | 18 | 17 | 25.00 |

P – Total of played matches W – Won matches D – Drawn matches L – Lost matches GS – Goal scored GA – Goals against
%W – Percentage of matches won

== Personnel ==
=== Current technical staff ===
As of 21 February 2024

| Position | Name |
|---|---|
| Head coach | (Bangladesh) Md Mohi Uddin |
| Team manager | (Bangladesh) Shakhawat Hossain Bhuiya Shahin |
| Team leader | (Bangladesh) Moshur Rahman |
| Assistant manager | (Bangladesh) Md Nazrul Kabir Shipon |
| Assistant coach | (Bangladesh) Md Jahangir Alam |
| Goalkeeping coach | (Bangladesh) Mohit Karmaker |
| Fitness trainer | (Bangladesh) Arif Chowdhury |
| Equipment manager | (Bangladesh) Sujon Chandra Das |
| Masseur | (Bangladesh) Md Sohel |

== Management ==
=== Board of directors ===
As of 7 December 2023

| Position | Name |
|---|---|
| President | (Bangladesh) Tabith Awal |
| Vice-president (Senior) | (Bangladesh) Tajwar M Awal |
| General Secretary | (Bangladesh) Shakhawat Hossai Shahin |
| Joint General Secretary | (Bangladesh) Mohiuddin Liton |
| Organizing Secretary | (Bangladesh) Sheikh Nazmul Islam Bokul |
| Football Secretary | (Bangladesh) Zulfiker Mahmud Mintu |
| Sports Secretary | (Bangladesh) Jalal Uddin |

== Competitive record ==
Record as Professional Football League member
| Season | Division | League | | | | | | | | Federation Cup | Independence Cup | Top league scorer(s) | |
| Season | Division | P | W | D | L | GF | GA | Pts | Position | Federation Cup | Independence Cup | Player | Goals |
|---|---|---|---|---|---|---|---|---|---|---|---|---|---|
| 2017–18 | BCL | 18 | 10 | 5 | 3 | 23 | 19 | 35 | Runners-up | — | — | (Bangladesh) Ariful Islam | 12 |
| 2018–19 | BPL | 24 | 5 | 5 | 14 | 24 | 42 | 20 | 12th | Group Stage | Group Stage | (Guinea) Ismael Bangoura | 12 |
| 2019–20 | BCL | Cancelled | | | | | | | | — | — | — | — |
| 2020–21 | BCL | 22 | 13 | 5 | 4 | 34 | 10 | 44 | Runners-up | — | — | (Bangladesh) Fuad Hasan | 7 |
| 2021–22 | BCL | 22 | 10 | 8 | 4 | 36 | 17 | 38 | 3rd | — | — | (Bangladesh) Rafiqul Islam | 12 |
| 2022–23 | BCL | 20 | 6 | 7 | 7 | 26 | 25 | 25 | 5th | — | — | (Bangladesh) Abid Hasan Abir | 7 |
| 2023–24 | BCL | 14 | 3 | 8 | 3 | 9 | 11 | 17 | 6th | — | — | (Bangladesh) Md Faizullah | 3 |

| Champions | Runners-up | Promoted | Relegated |

== Youth team ==
=== 2019 BFF U-18 Football Tournament triumph ===
The clubs focus on creating a pipeline of young talent was showcased as they won the 2019 BFF U-18 Football Tournament, guided by former player turned coach Akbor Hossain Ridon. Nofel's president Tabith M Awal, appointed former captain Akbor Hossain Ridon as coach for the U18 team for the 2019 BFF U-18 Football Tournament, where all the top-tier clubs participated. Following Nofel's relegation the club authorities main focus was to produce talented players for the future generation, nevertheless, Nofel U18 entered the tournament as underdogs. They started the group-stages with a draw against Saif SC U18, followed by a stunning win against Sheikh Russel U18, thanks to goals from Mohammed Piash and Arman Hossain Abir. The win helped them advance through the group as the second placed team. Nofel won the quarter-finals against a strong Arambagh U18 team on penalties, and then went on to stun tournament favorites Bashundhara Kings U18, knocking them out on penalties as well. In the finals against Saif SC U18, who were managed by former Nofel coach Kamal Babu, striker Arman Hossain Abir scored the winner 9 minutes from fulltime to win Nofel the trophy.

== Honours ==
- Bangladesh Championship League
  - Runners-up (1): 2017
