= Uttara FC =

Bangladeshi association football club

Uttara
- Full name: Uttara Football Club
- Short name: UFC
- Founded: 2020; 6 years ago
- Head coach: Md Anowar Hosan
- League: Bangladesh Championship League

Uttara Football Club (Bengali: উত্তরা ফুটবল ক্লাব, Bengali pronunciation: [utːora fuʈbɔl klab]), commonly known as Uttara is a Bangladeshi football club based in Dhaka. It currently competes in the Dhaka Senior Division League, the third-tier of Bangladeshi football.

Active departments of Uttara FC
- Football (Men's): Football (Women's)

== History ==
On 5 February 2020, Bangladesh Football Federation gave the green signal to the club to participate in 2019–20 Bangladesh Championship League. The prime purpose of the club is to bring back professionalism in Bangladesh football arena.

Uttara FC played there first match in the 2021 Bangladesh Championship League on 7 February 2021 and won against NoFeL SC

== Current squad ==
As of 6 March 2024

Note: Flags indicate national team as defined under FIFA eligibility rules; some limited exceptions apply. Players may hold more than one non-FIFA nationality.

No.	Pos.	Nation	Player
1	GK	BAN	Robel Mia (Captain)
2	DF	BAN	Md Mominur Fokir
3	DF	BAN	Rajib Mia
4	DF	BAN	Bijoy Chandra Das
5	DF	BAN	Md Rakibul Islam
6	DF	BAN	Sakim Mia
7	MF	BAN	Joy Kumar
8	MF	BAN	Md Moinuddin
9	FW	BAN	Md Nayeem Hossain
10	MF	BAN	Md Rashedol Islam
11	FW	BAN	Md Hasan
12	DF	BAN	Md Kamran Ahmed
13	MF	BAN	Sadman Shakib
14	DF	BAN	Md Labibur Rahman
16	MF	BAN	Maruf Ahamod
17	DF	BAN	Md Manik
18	DF	BAN	Md Kamrul Hasan

No.	Pos.	Nation	Player
19	FW	BAN	Shubo Rajbongshi
20	FW	BAN	Bijoy Ahammod
21	FW	BAN	Naky Chandra Das
22	GK	BAN	Md Antor Ali
25	MF	BAN	Apu Chandra Das
30	MF	BAN	Noorulzzaman
32	MF	BAN	Md Rasel
40	GK	BAN	Sagor Sorkar
44	DF	BAN	Md Akash Ali Zahir
66	FW	BAN	Khandokar Sharifur Rahman
71	DF	BAN	Nazrul Islam
75	FW	BAN	Afroze Ali
77	FW	BAN	Tarikul Islam
90	FW	BAN	Rohit Sarkar
98	DF	BAN	Md Fahim
99	FW	BAN	Md Rasedul Islam

== Current technical staff ==
As of 18 May 2024

Role	Name
Team manager	(Bangladesh) Md Maruf Afsari
Head coach	(Bangladesh) Md Anowar Hosan
Assistant manager	(Bangladesh) Md Taslim Sarkar
Assistant coach	(Bangladesh) Md Jaman Ahmed
Goalkeeper coach	(Bangladesh) Md Emran Hasan Emon
Technical director	(Bangladesh) Md Anowar Hosan
Equipment manager	(Bangladesh) Sharif Uddin Bhuiyan
Physio	(Bangladesh) Santhono Mollik
Media officer	(Bangladesh) Jahirul Islam Rony
Masseur	(Bangladesh) Md Faisal Ahmed Fahim
Masseur	(Bangladesh) Rapion Tripura

== Head coaches ==
As of 18 May 2024

Head Coach	From	To	P	W	D	L	GS	GA	%W
(Bangladesh) Abdur Razzak	5 January 2021	10 November 2021	22	6	7	9	20	23	27.27
(Bangladesh) Md Mahbub Ali Manik	8 February 2022	13 June 2022	22	7	6	9	33	40	31.82
(Bangladesh) Rokonuzzaman Kanchan	21 December 2022	19 April 2023	20	5	5	10	16	23	25.00
(Malaysia) Jacob M J Joseph	19 February 2024	18 March 2024	7	1	1	5	4	11	14.29
(Bangladesh) Md Anowar Hosan	28 March 2024	Present	7	0	0	7	6	24	0.00
