= Fakirerpool Young Men's Club =

- Full name: Fakirerpool Young Men's Club
- Nickname: Young Men's Club
- Founded: 1960; 66 years ago
- Ground: Shaheed Miraj–Tapan Stadium
- Capacity: 5,000
- President: Anwar Hossain Makhon
- Head Coach: Sawpan Kumar Das
- League: Bangladesh Football League
- 2025–26: Bangladesh Football League, 10th of 10 (Relegated)
| Home colours | Away colours |

Fakirerpool Young Men's Club (Bengali: ফকিরেরপুল ইয়াং মেনস ক্লাব) is a professional football club based in the Fakirapool suburb of Motijheel area of Dhaka, Bangladesh. It currently competes in the Bangladesh Football League, the top flight of Bangladeshi football, having gained promotion from the 2023–24 Bangladesh Championship League.

== History ==
=== Early years (1960–1987) ===
Fakirerpool Young Men's Club was established in Fakirapool, Motijheel area of Dhaka in 1960. Manjur Hossain Malu, one of the club's main administrators during its early years, also served as its general secretary until 2010. In the following year, the club participated in the Dhaka Third Division Football League and earned promotion to the Second Division as league champions.

During their time in the Second Division, the club produced talents such as Enayetur Rahman Khan, nonetheless, failed to gain promotion to the top division for almost three decades. It was in 1987, under the coaching of Shahiduddin Ahmed Selim, that the club finally earned promotion to the First Division, as unbeaten Dhaka Second Division Football League champions. Additionally, the club's striker, Mizanur Rahman Mizan, finished as league top scorer with seven goals.

The club also established a junior team, Fakirerpool Shurjo Torun Sangha (formerly Fakirerpool B), which began participating in the Pioneer Football League. In the early 80s, the club helped players such as Imtiaz Sultan Johnny, Monir Hossain Manu and Nurul Haque Manik began their careers in Dhaka football.

=== The talent hub (1988–1999) ===
During their debut season in the First Division, in 1988/89, Fakirerpool finished sixth and made the cut for the championship play-offs. The club's most notable achievement came during their second season in the top-flight, putting an end to Mohammedan Sporting Club's historic 76-game unbeaten league run on 16 March 1990, with goals from Sadequl Islam Uttam and Shankar in a 2–1 victory.

Some notable players from Fakirerpool's first stint in the top-flight under coach Shahid Uddin Ahmed Selim were Mizanur Rahman Mizan, Nurul Haque Manik, Sadequl Islam Uttam, Piyus, and Mohammed Ponir, to name a few. However, observing the club's performances in their debut First Division season, their players were poached by local giants Mohammedan SC and Brothers Union, the latter also capturing coach Selim's signature in 1991.

After finishing in the bottom ten positions (11th) in the 1992 season, they were not given entry to the Dhaka Premier Division Football League upon its introduction in 1993. Instead, they remained participants in the First Division, which began serving as the second-tier. In the First Division's inaugural season as the country's second-tier league, Nazrul Islam Ledu guided the club to promotion to the Premier Division as league champions.

Upon their return to the top-flight, the club roped in numerous players from the Bangladesh Krira Shikkha Protishtan team which triumphed in both the Dana Cup and Gothia Cup in the early 90s. Some notable recruitments included, Hassan Al-Mamun, Askar Babu, Amin Rana and Sohel Al-Masum. The young team coached by Nazrul Islam Ledu and captained by Golam Robbani Choton, managed to survive the drop in their first season back. Eventually the club saw an improvement in performances, finishing in the top-five in both 1995 and 1996. Nonetheless, were relegated to the First Division in 1999.

=== Financial woes and professionalization (2000–2018) ===
Fakirerpool returned to the Premier Division once again after winning the 2003/04 First Division League. However, the club was relegated in the first season following their return and missed out on a spot in the 2007 B.League, the inaugural edition of the country's first top-tier professional football league, the Bangladesh Premier League (formerly B.League). From 2005 to 2006, the club remained inactive as the First Division was not held. Then, in 2007, it was merged into the Premier Division to create the Dhaka Senior Division Football League, serving as the second-tier to the professional league.

In 2007, the club clinched victory in the inaugural edition of the Senior Division and was poised to participate in the 2008–09 B.League. However, they were not invited to participate in the professional league for unknown reasons. In the subsequent edition of the Senior Division held in 2010, the club successfully defended their title. Nonetheless, they faced the same fate, as their entry to the 2010–11 B.League was denied.

Eventually, the club gained entry into the second-tier professional league introduced in 2012, the Bangladesh Championship League, starting from the 2014–15 season as champions of the 2014 Dhaka Senior Division League. Fakirerpool became champions of the 2015–16 Bangladesh Championship League, held in 2017. However, for the third time in the club's history failed to appear in the Bangladesh Premier League even after securing promotion through merit. The club's withdrawal from the Premier League this time was reported to have been due to internal conflict and financial issues.

=== Casino scandal and new era (2019–present) ===
On 18 September 2019, Fakirerpool was one of the four Motijheel-based clubs raided by the Bangladesh Police. It was found that the club had been operating an illegal casino inside its premises. Khalid Mahmud Bhuiyan, a Jubo League leader and the club's president at the time, was later arrested. He was accused of importing modern gambling equipment from abroad at a cost of Tk1.5 crore and installing them at the club. Additionally, he was reported to have hired several Nepalis to run this illegal business. The club's involvement in gambling culture reportedly began in 1988 when the clubhouse and premises were allocated by the National Sports Council. This eventually led to the departure of its founder, Manjur Hossain Malu, in 2010. Following the incident, the club premises remained under lockdown.

On 4 January 2023, the club elected a new 69-member committee, with former vice-president Haji Mohammad Salim, who was jailed for six months in the casino scandal, elected as the new chairman. Anwar Hossain Makhon and Mostafizur Rahman Mainu were elected as the president and general secretary, respectively. Both of them had previously served jail time due to the casino scandal. During their incarceration, Mozammel Haque acted as the chairman of the governing body, but he left the post following their release. On 1 September 2023, the club premise was finally reopened after being closed for almost four years.

The club began the 2023–24 Bangladesh Championship League under coach Imtiaz Khan Lablu. On 23 April 2024, following a 2–1 victory over PWD Sports Club, Fakirerpool once again secured promotion to the Bangladesh Premier League as league champions. The club's striker, Rafayel Tudu, finished as the league's top scorer with 12 goals, while goalkeeper Shaju Ahmed won the "Best Goalkeeper Award".

== Current squad ==
As of 3 September 2026

Note: Flags indicate national team as defined under FIFA eligibility rules; some limited exceptions apply. Players may hold more than one non-FIFA nationality.

| No. | Pos. | Nation | Player |
|---|---|---|---|
| 1 | GK | BAN | Md Rubel Hossain |
| 2 | DF | BAN | Md Mosharaf Hossain Shanto |
| 3 | DF | BAN | Md Jinto |
| 4 | DF | BAN | Md Rakib Rahman |
| 5 | DF | BAN | Raficul Islam (Captain) |
| 6 | MF | CIV | Dasso Sidik |
| 7 | MF | BAN | Md Sagor Hossain |
| 8 | GK | BAN | Md Antor Ali |
| 10 | FW | GAM | Sulayman Sillah |
| 14 | MF | BAN | Shiblal Desh Tudu |
| 15 | MF | BAN | Emon Mia |
| 16 | DF | BAN | Yeasin Mia |
| 17 | MF | BAN | Al-Amin |
| 18 | DF | BAN | Md Sohel Rana |
| 18 | FW | BAN | Diuk Murmu |
| 19 | MF | BAN | Md Seim |
| 20 | FW | BAN | Saif Hossain |
| 21 | MF | BAN | Rafiqul Islam |

| No. | Pos. | Nation | Player |
|---|---|---|---|
| 22 | MF | BAN | Md Ridoy Hawladar |
| 24 | FW | BAN | Md Hafizur Rahman |
| 25 | FW | BAN | Md Riyed |
| 27 | MF | BAN | Porshanto Roy |
| 30 | GK | BAN | Tamim Ahmed |
| 32 | DF | BAN | Muhammad Salman Farchi |
| 33 | DF | CIV | Mohamed Fofana |
| 40 | GK | BAN | Md Mezbahul Haque Zisan |
| 55 | MF | BAN | Mahed Hassan Polash |
| 66 | DF | BAN | Md Rifat Hossain |
| 69 | FW | CIV | Ben Ibrahim Ouattara |
| 70 | FW | BAN | Md Sharif Islam |
| 77 | DF | BAN | Md Merajul Islam |
| 80 | FW | BAN | Md Hossen Ali |
| 84 | DF | BAN | Md Sabbir Hosen |
| 88 | DF | BAN | Jiaul Hasan |
| 98 | MF | BAN | Md Tamim Hossain Anik |

== Coaching staff ==
=== Managerial statistics ===
As of 23 May 2026

| Head Coach | From | To | P | W | D | L | GS | GA | %W |
|---|---|---|---|---|---|---|---|---|---|
| (Bangladesh) Mohidur Rahman | 10 January 2021 | 15 November 2021 | 22 | 6 | 8 | 8 | 25 | 21 | 27.27 |
| (Bangladesh) Md Shahdat Hossain | 10 January 2022 | 19 April 2023 | 20 | 8 | 5 | 7 | 22 | 24 | 40.00 |
| (Bangladesh) Imtiaz Khan Lablu | 19 February 2024 | 1 May 2024 | 14 | 8 | 3 | 3 | 28 | 14 | 57.14 |
| (Uzbekistan) Albert Lyapin | 1 October 2024 | 9 May 2025 | 17 | 4 | 2 | 11 | 18 | 50 | 23.53 |
| (Bangladesh) Sawpan Kumar Das | 10 May 2025 | Present | 27 | 4 | 5 | 18 | 23 | 70 | 14.81 |

== Personnel ==
=== Current technical staff ===
As of 20 May 2025

| Role | Name |
|---|---|
| Head coach | (Bangladesh) Sawpan Kumar Das |
| Team Manager | (Bangladesh) M.H. Pipul |
| Assistant Coach | (Bangladesh) Imtiaz Khan Lablu |
| Assistant Manager | (Bangladesh) Md Asadul Islam |
| Team Leader | (Bangladesh) Ahammad Ali |
| Media Officer | (Bangladesh) Md Ullah Dalim |
| Security Officer | (Bangladesh) Monir Hossain |
| Interpreter | (Bangladesh) Md Shahiduzzaman |
| Physiotherapist | (Bangladesh) Shantonu Mallik |

=== Club officials ===
As of 12 September 2025

| Position | Name |
|---|---|
| President | (Bangladesh) Anwar Hossain Makhon |
| Chairman | (Bangladesh) Haji Mohammad Salim |
| General Secretary | (Bangladesh) Ahammad Ali |

== Competitive record ==
Record as Professional Football League member
| Season | Division | League | | | | | | | | Federation Cup | Independence Cup | Top league scorer(s) | |
| Season | Division | P | W | D | L | GF | GA | Pts | Position | Federation Cup | Independence Cup | Player | Goals |
|---|---|---|---|---|---|---|---|---|---|---|---|---|---|
| 2014–15 | BCL | 14 | 4 | 3 | 7 | 9 | 22 | 15 | 7th | DNP | DNP | | |
| 2015–16 | BCL | 14 | 7 | 6 | 1 | 15 | 8 | 27 | Champions | DNP | DNP | | |
| 2017 | BCL | 18 | 6 | 7 | 5 | 14 | 12 | 25 | 4th | DNP | DNP | | |
| 2018–19 | BCL | 20 | 6 | 7 | 7 | 22 | 26 | 25 | 7th | DNP | DNP | | |
| 2019–20 | BCL | Cancelled | | | | | | | | DNP | DNP | — | — |
| 2020–21 | BCL | 22 | 6 | 8 | 8 | 25 | 21 | 26 | 7th | DNP | DNP | | |
| 2021–22 | BCL | 22 | 6 | 11 | 5 | 26 | 21 | 29 | 6th | DNP | DNP | | |
| 2022–23 | BCL | 20 | 8 | 5 | 7 | 22 | 24 | 29 | 4th | DNP | Group-stage | | |
| 2023–24 | BCL | 14 | 8 | 3 | 3 | 28 | 14 | 27 | Champions* | DNP | DNP | | |

| Champions | Runners-up | Cancelled | Relegated |

* – Promoted

== Honours ==
- Bangladesh Championship League
  - Champions (2): 2015–16, 2023–24
- Dhaka Senior Division League
  - Champions (3): 2007–08, 2010, 2014
- Dhaka First Division League
  - Champions (2): 1993, 2003–04
  - Runners-up (1): 2000
- Dhaka Second Division League
  - Champions (1): 1987
- Dhaka Third Division League
  - Champions (1): 1961
