= Kawran Bazar Pragati Sangha =

Bangladeshi association football club

Kawran Bazar PS কাওরান বাজার প্রগতি সংঘ
- Full name: Kawran Bazar Pragati Sangha
- Nickname: Kawran Bazar PS
- Founded: 1985; 41 years ago
- Chairman: Md Morshed Alam
- Head Coach: Md Rezaul Haque Jamal
- League: Bangladesh Championship League
- 2020-21: 4th

Kawran Bazar Pragati Sangha (Bengali: কাওরান বাজার প্রগতি সংঘ, Bengali pronunciation: [kaoran bazar proɡoti ʃɔŋɡʱo]) is a football team from Dhaka, Bangladesh. It is currently a team of Bangladesh Championship League (BCL). Kawran Bazar gained promotion from the Senior Division League in 2020.

== History ==
Kawran Bazar Pragti Sangh, which was established around 1985, and carries out their club activities at the Kawran Bazar Panchstara Sahandya Artaddar Bahumukhi Cooperative association clubhouse, under president Mosharraf Hossain. The club were crowned champions of the 2018–19 Dhaka Senior Division League, thus gaining promotion to the Bangladesh Championship League, which is the country's second-tier.

=== Match-fixing allegation ===
In March 2022, investigations revealed that the club involved in match fixing, as evidence was found against coaches, managers and footballers of the team. The club's authorities and staff were involved in an online gambling event, and according to reports the players were given a reward of 50,000 TK if they played according to the bettor's instructions, during the 2021–22 Bangladesh Championship League season. The prices were fixed in separate categories from footballers to coaches-managers and others.

Mosharraf Hossain, the club's president, responded to the accusations, "I do not know anything about this. If something like this happened, action will definitely be taken". Within a few days after the allegations, the club sacked coach Rezaul Haque Jamal. During the same league season, many other Championship League clubs were accused of Spot-fixing.

Bangladesh Football Federation announced that they would start their own investigation about the match fixing allegations imposed on the Bangladesh Championship League clubs, as soon as the league season ended, In June 2022.

== Current players ==
Kawran Bazar PS squad for 2021–22 season.

As of 20 January 2022

Note: Flags indicate national team as defined under FIFA eligibility rules; some limited exceptions apply. Players may hold more than one non-FIFA nationality.

No.	Pos.	Nation	Player
1	GK	BAN	Md Rabiul Islam
2	DF	BAN	Bipul Kumar Sarkar
3	MF	BAN	Akramur Zaman Liton
4	DF	BAN	Rajib Mia
6	MF	BAN	Md Ashraf Uddin Ripok
7	MF	BAN	Arif Hawlader
8	FW	BAN	Raja Ansari
9	FW	BAN	Miaraj Hossain
10	FW	BAN	Arman Hossain
11	MF	BAN	Md Hasan
12	FW	BAN	Md Zahirul Islam
13	FW	BAN	Roni Mia
14	DF	BAN	Md Tarikul Islam
15	FW	BAN	Md Amir Ali

No.	Pos.	Nation	Player
17	FW	BAN	Md Kiron Mahmud
18	DF	BAN	Hasibul Islam
19	FW	BAN	Md Sarjan Mia
20	MF	BAN	Md Mehidi Hasan
21	MF	BAN	Redwan Hasan Linkon
22	GK	BAN	Ragib-Al-Anzum Nirob
23	DF	BAN	Sakim Mia
24	MF	BAN	Fardin Khan
26	DF	BAN	Mohmmad Dipu Rayhan
28	DF	BAN	Md Maminul Islam
29	FW	BAN	Md Saiful Islam
30	GK	BAN	Rajib Islam
31	MF	BAN	Md Piel Mahmud
35	DF	BAN	Md Shaikh Sajol

== Head coach ==
As of 30 April 2022

Head Coach	From	To	P	W	D	L	GS	GA	%W
(Bangladesh) Faraz Hossain	1 January 2021	30 August 2021	22	12	5	5	32	17	54.55
(Bangladesh) Md Rezaul Haque Jamal	5 January 2022	present	14	2	4	8	7	26	14.29

== Honours ==
=== League ===
- Dhaka Senior Division Football League
  - Winners (1): 2018–19
