= Wari Club =

Bangladeshi association football club

- Full name: Wari Club
- Short name: WC
- Founded: 1898; 128 years ago
- President: Md Shahidul Islam
- Head Coach: Muhammad Asharful Haque Apple
- League: Bangladesh Championship League
- 2025–26: 8th of 10
Home colours	Away colours

Wari Club (Bengali: ওয়ারী ক্লাব) is an association football club from Dhaka, Bangladesh. It currently competes in the Bangladesh Championship League (BCL). Wari is the oldest football club in Bangladesh, established in 1898. The club's motto is One heart one mind.

== History ==
In 1898, after the discontinuation of Wellington Club, a few of its sports-loving members decided to form the Wari Club. During the British rule in India, Rai Bahadur Surendranath Rai played a key role in forming the club. After gaining popularity, the club in 1930, found their playing field at Paltan Ground in Dacca. The first success came in 1910 at Cooch Behar, when Wari defeated the British King's House club at a tournament.

In the prestigious IFA Shield tournament, (Note: Fourth oldest football tournament, organized by the IFA (W.B.), and played between the local clubs of West Bengal and other invited ones.) they had moderate success until 1945. One of their most noteworthy achievements came in 1917, when they defeated defending champions Lincoln Club in Calcutta.

Since its establishment, the D.C. of Dhaka District became the club's president without facing any competition. Wari Club gained popularity in 1978, as they defeated Abahani Krira Chakra in the First Division. The team is currently competing in the Bangladesh Championship League.

== Current squad ==
As of 25 January 2026

Note: Flags indicate national team as defined under FIFA eligibility rules; some limited exceptions apply. Players may hold more than one non-FIFA nationality.

No.	Pos.	Nation	Player
1	GK	BAN	Md Sujon Chowdhury
2	DF	BAN	Md Nayan Hossain
3	DF	BAN	Sajeeb Bairagi
4	DF	BAN	Ashiqur Rahman Bhuiyan
5	DF	BAN	Md Hasebul Hasan Santo
6	MF	BAN	Ajfer Akib Jabed
7	MF	BAN	Md Rakib (Captain)
8	MF	BAN	Md Mahmudul Hasan
9	MF	BAN	Md Jibon Mia
10	FW	BAN	Safin Ahmed Shanto
11	FW	BAN	Anik Debarma Suban
12	FW	BAN	Md Yamin Rana
13	MF	BAN	Md Raj Mollah
14	DF	BAN	Md Golam Rabbani
15	MF	BAN	Mahir Aowchap
16	DF	BAN	Md Ekayub Mia
17	FW	BAN	Hira Ghose
18	MF	BAN	Md Ratul Hasan

No.	Pos.	Nation	Player
19	FW	BAN	Aswad Bin Walid Khan
20	FW	BAN	Mizanur Rahman Mizan
21	FW	BAN	Iqbal Hossain
22	MF	BAN	Md Shorif
23	FW	BAN	Ariyan Shikder
24	FW	BAN	Md Nahed Hasan
25	DF	BAN	Md Delowar Hasan Nehal
26	DF	BAN	Md Yousuf Ali
27	FW	BAN	Md Jubayer Ahmaed
28	DF	BAN	Akash Ali
29	FW	BAN	Md Sabbir Hossain
30	GK	BAN	Md Mustafiqur Rahman Anik
31	GK	BAN	Md Shahin Molla
32	MF	BAN	Md Abu Taleb
33	DF	BAN	Md Mehadi Hasan
34	FW	BAN	Samim Ibne Shahid
35	GK	BAN	Joy Chowdhury
36	FW	BAN	Prince Ahmed

== Other departments ==
The club also has cricket, hockey, volleyball, and table tennis departments. The hockey team also started to do well as it became Dhaka Hockey League runners-up in 1953 and then champions in 1964.

Success also followed the table tennis team, when Wari won the "Akhtar Memorial Table Tennis Tournament" in 1976 and 1977. Its volleyball team also achieved success as they became the dominant team in the 1970s and 80s, winning leagues on numerous occasions.

== Team record ==
=== Head coach record ===
As of 4 May 2026

Head Coach	From	To	P	W	D	L	GS	GA	%W
(Bangladesh) Imtiaz Khan Labu	20 March 2020	5 December 2021	11	2	5	4	7	10	18.18
(Bangladesh) Abu Yusuf	3 June 2021	19 July 2021	11	3	5	3	13	14	27.27
(Bangladesh) Kamal Babu	20 December 2021	13 June 2022	22	6	7	9	19	20	27.27
(Bangladesh) Md Ekramur Rana	21 December 2022	19 April 2023	20	6	7	7	22	24	30.00
(Bangladesh) Md Rasidul Islam Shamim	19 February 2024	Present	14	5	5	4	14	9	35.71
(Bangladesh) Md Asharful Haque Apple	1 January 2025	Present	36	10	12	14	41	46	27.78

== Personnel ==
=== Current technical staff ===
As of 25 January 2026

Position	Name
Head coach	(Bangladesh) Asharful Haque Apple
Team Manager	(Bangladesh) Obidur Rahman Ripon
Team Leader	(Bangladesh) J.A Naser
Technical Director	(Bangladesh) S.M Zakaria Babu
Media Officer	(Bangladesh) Kabir Uddin Sarker
Assistant Coach	(Bangladesh) Sarkar Hossain Chanchal
Physiotherapist	(Bangladesh) Mahbub Alam
Masseur	(Bangladesh) Abdul Karim
Masseur	(Bangladesh) Md Sabbif
Trainer	(Bangladesh) Abdullah Al Mamun

== Honours ==
- Nar Narayan Shield
  - Winners (1): 1948

== See also ==
- List of football clubs in Bangladesh
- History of football in Bangladesh
- Wari AC
