= Farashganj SC =

Bangladeshi association football club

- Full name: Farashganj Sporting Club
- Founded: 1959; 67 years ago
- Ground: Bir Sherestha Shaheed Shipahi Mostafa Kamal Stadium
- Capacity: 25,000
- Chairman: Haji Mohammad Aslam
- Head Coach: Azmol Hossain Biddyut
- League: Bangladesh Championship League
- 2024–25: Bangladesh Championship League, 8th of 10
- Website: https://fscdh.site123.me/#
Home colours	Away colours

Farashganj Sporting Club (Bengali: ফরাশগঞ্জ স্পোর্টিং ক্লাব, Bengali pronunciation: [fɔraʃɡɔndʒ ˈspoɾʈiŋ klab]), commonly known as Farashganj, is an association football club based in Farashganj, Dhaka, Bangladesh.

It will compete in the Dhaka Senior Division League following relegation from the 2023–24 Bangladesh Championship League.

Farashganj Sporting Club is situated between the historical sites Ruplal House and Northbrook Hall in the old part of Dhaka. It was also a team of Bangladesh Premier League until its relegation in the 2017–18 season. After its relegation from the top division the clubs trajectory went downhill as they are currently fighting relegation in the second tier of Bangladesh football league system.

Active departments of Farashganj SC
- Football (Men's): Football (women's)

== Current squad ==
As of 24 February 2024

Note: Flags indicate national team as defined under FIFA eligibility rules; some limited exceptions apply. Players may hold more than one non-FIFA nationality.

No.	Pos.	Nation	Player
1	GK	BAN	Md Salim
2	DF	BAN	Prakas Das
3	DF	BAN	Topu Tarafder
4	DF	BAN	Ridoy Chondro Bormon
5	DF	BAN	Riyaz Choiyal
6	MF	BAN	Md Sujon (Captain)
7	MF	BAN	Md Nazmul Ahmed Shakil
8	MF	BAN	Md Raja Sheikh
9	FW	BAN	Md Ali Hossain
10	FW	BAN	Md Rezzatul Islam
11	MF	BAN	Al Amin
12	FW	BAN	Md Repon Shaikh
13	DF	BAN	Md Shahadat Hosen
14	DF	BAN	Rayhan Ahmed
15	FW	BAN	Md Shihab
16	MF	BAN	Md Saidul Islam Sohidul
17	MF	BAN	Jobaed Hasan Jikon

No.	Pos.	Nation	Player
18	DF	BAN	Md Habibur Rahman
19	MF	BAN	Md Sohel
20	FW	BAN	Md Sakib Chowdahury
21	DF	BAN	Rabid Das
22	GK	BAN	Saiful Islam Khan
23	MF	BAN	Kakon Das
25	GK	BAN	Md Miraj Hawladar
26	MF	BAN	Md Masum Mia
27	DF	BAN	Md Badsha Mia
28	GK	BAN	Md Shrabon Hossain
29	DF	BAN	Abu Sadek
30	MF	BAN	Tonobir Mollik
31	FW	BAN	Md Amirul Islam
32	DF	BAN	Rabby Bhuiya
33	DF	BAN	Md Riaz Hossain Shuvo
34	DF	BAN	Md Shahin Alam
35	MF	BAN	Md Jone Islam

== Head coach record ==
As of 22 May 2025

Head Coach	From	To	P	W	D	L	GS	GA	%W
(Bangladesh) Didarul Alam	15 January 2021	15 October 2021	22	5	10	7	25	27	22.73
(Bangladesh) Md Saiful Islam Chonchal	9 December 2021	Present	37	8	14	15	37	46	21.62
(Bangladesh) Azmol Hossain Biddyut	15 January 2025	Present	18	4	5	9	14	21	22.22

== Personnel ==
=== Current coaching staff ===
As of 2 February 2025

Position	Name
Team Manager	(Bangladesh) Mojibor Rahman Anno
Team Leader	(Bangladesh) Md Delowar Hossains
Assistant Manager	(Bangladesh) Md Monir Hossain
Head Coach	(Bangladesh) Azmol Hossain Biddyut
Assistant Coach	(Bangladesh) Md Shohug Hossain Polash
Media Manager	(Bangladesh) Nironton Ghose Harun
Security Officer	(Bangladesh) Md Kamrul Islam
Equipment Officer	(Bangladesh) Monodi Bose Baburam
Masseur	(Bangladesh) Md Nonir Hossain (Bangladesh) Md Abul Kalam Azad

== Management ==
=== Board of directors ===
As of 2 February 2025

Position	Name
President	(Bangladesh) Nazrul Islam azad
General Secretary	(Bangladesh) Sheikh Azizul Islam Aziz

== Honours ==
- Independence Cup
  - Winners (1): 2011
- Dhaka Second Division League
  - Champions (1): 1980
- Dhaka Third Division League
  - Champions (1): 1968
