= 2025–26 in Bangladeshi football =

2025–26 Bangladeshi football season

Football in Bangladesh
- Season: 2025–26

Men's football
- BFL: Bashundhara Kings (5th title)
- BCL: Chattogram City (1st title)
- 1st Division: Jatrabari KC (1st title)
- 2nd Division: Bangladesh Krira Shikkha Protishtan football team (1st title)
- Federation Cup: Bashundhara Kings (5th title)
- Challenge Cup: Bashundhara Kings (2nd title)

Women's football
- BWFL: Rajshahi Stars

The 2025–26 season was the 54th competitive association football season in Bangladesh. The domestic season was begun on 1 June 2025, while the national team season commences on 4 June 2025 and concluded on 30 June 2026.

The following is a list of match results in the 2025–26 season, as well as any future matches that have been scheduled in the season.

Legend

Win Draw Loss Void or postponed Fixtures

== Men's national teams ==
=== Friendlies game ===
2025

4 June 2025 Friendly	Bangladesh	2–0	Bhutan	Dhaka, Bangladesh
19:00 BST (UTC+6)	Hamza 6'; Sohel 50'	Report		Stadium: National Stadium; Attendance: 17,645; Referee: Kasun Lakmal Weerakkody (Sri Lanka)

18 August 2025 Hybrid friendly	Bangladesh	0–0	(Bangladesh) Police FC	Dhaka, Bangladesh
15:00 UTC+6				Stadium: National Stadium

24 August 2025 Hybrid friendly	Bangladesh	4–0	(Bangladesh) Fortis	Dhaka, Bangladesh
15:00 UTC+6				Stadium: National Stadium

6 September 2025 Friendly	Nepal	0–0	Bangladesh	Kathmandu, Nepal
17:45 BST (UTC+6)		Report		Stadium: Dasharath Rangasala; Referee: Ugyen Penjor (Bhutan)

9 September 2025 Friendly	Nepal	v	Bangladesh	Kathmandu, Nepal
BST (UTC+6)				Stadium: Dasharath Rangasala

7 November 2025 Hybrid friendly	Bangladesh	0–1	(Bangladesh) Fortis	Dhaka, Bangladesh
18:00 UTC+6				Stadium: National Stadium

13 November 2025 Friendly	Bangladesh	2–2	Nepal	Dhaka, Bangladesh
20:00 BST (UTC+6)	Hamza 46', 50' (pen.)	Report	R. Chand 29'; A. Tamang 90+3'	Stadium: National Stadium; Referee: Kasun Lakmal Weerakkody (Sri Lanka)

2026

26 March 2026 Friendly	Bangladesh	0–3	Vietnam	Hanoi, Vietnam
19:00 (UTC+6)		Report	Z. Ahmed 8' (o.g.); Phạm Xuân Mạnh 18'; Nguyễn Hai Long 38'	Stadium: Hàng Đẫy Stadium; Referee: Cheung Wai Lung Mario (Hong Kong)

=== 2027 AFC Asian Cup qualification ===
Group C

Pos	Team	Pld	W	D	L	GF	GA	GD	Pts	Qualification	(Singapore)	(Hong Kong)	(Bangladesh)	(India)
1	Singapore	6	4	2	0	8	4	+4	14	2027 AFC Asian Cup		0–0	1–0	1–1
2	Hong Kong	6	2	2	2	8	8	0	8		1–2		1–1	1–0
3	Bangladesh	6	1	2	3	6	8	−2	5		1–2	3–4		1–0
4	India	6	1	2	3	4	6	−2	5		1–2	2–1	0–0	

Source: AFC
Legend: Blue = home team win; Yellow = draw; Red = away team win.
Rules for classification: Tiebreakers

10 June 2025 2027 ACQ – 3R	Bangladesh	1–2	Singapore	Dhaka, Bangladesh
19:00 BST (UTC+6)	Rakib 67'	Report	Song Ui-young 45'; Ikhsan 58'	Stadium: National Stadium; Attendance: 21,317; Referee: Clifford Daypuyat (Philippines)

9 October 2025 2027 ACQ – 3R	Bangladesh	3–4	Hong Kong	Dhaka, Bangladesh
20:00 BST (UTC+6)	Choudhury 13'; Morsalin 84'; Shome 90+9'	Report	Camargo 45+4'; Merkies 50', 75', 90+11'	Stadium: National Stadium; Attendance: 22,343; Referee: Saud Al Samhan (Kuwait)

14 October 2025 2027 ACQ – 3R	Hong Kong	1–1	Bangladesh	Kowloon, Hong Kong
BST (UTC+6)	Orr 36' (pen.)	Report; Report (AFC)	Rakib 84'	Stadium: Kai Tak Sports Park Main Stadium; Attendance: 45,489; Referee: Hiroki Kasahara (Japan)

18 November 2025 2027 ACQ – 3R	Bangladesh	1–0	India	Dhaka, Bangladesh
20:00 BST (UTC+6)	Morsalin 11'	Report; Report (AFC)		Stadium: National Stadium; Attendance: 23,712; Referee: Clifford Daypuyat (Philippines)

31 March 2026 2027 ACQ – 3R	Singapore	1–0	Bangladesh	Kallang, Singapore
	H. Stewart 31'	Report; Report (AFC)		Stadium: National Stadium; Attendance: 30,105; Referee: Ben Abraham (Australia)

== Under-23 football team ==
=== Friendlies game ===
8 July 2025 Hybrid friendly	Bangladesh	0–0	(Bangladesh) Army FT	Dhaka, Bangladesh
15:00 BST (UTC+6)				Stadium: Kings Arena Practice Ground

18 August 2025 Friendly Game	Bahrain	1–0	Bangladesh	Manama, Bahrain
21:00 BST (UTC+6)	Issa (?)	Report		Stadium: BFA Football Field

22 August 2025 Friendly Game	Bahrain	4–2	Bangladesh	Manama, Bahrain
21:00 BST (UTC+6)	Al-Khalaf (?); Al-Subaie (?); Mubarak (?); Al-Obaidli (?)	Report	Akash (?); Mirajul (?)	Stadium: BFA Football Field

=== 2026 AFC Under-23 Asian Cup Qualification ===
Group C

Pos	Team	Pld	W	D	L	GF	GA	GD	Pts	Qualification
1	Vietnam (H)	3	3	0	0	4	0	+4	9	Final tournament
2	Yemen	3	2	0	1	3	2	+1	6	
3	Bangladesh	3	1	0	2	4	4	0	3	
4	Singapore	3	0	0	3	2	7	−5	0	

Source: AFC
Rules for classification: Qualification tiebreakers
(H) Hosts

3 September 2025 2026 AFC U23 Q	Vietnam	2–0	Bangladesh	Việt Trì, Vietnam
19:00 BST (UTC+6)	Nguyễn Ngọc Mỹ 16'; Viktor Le 84'	Report		Stadium: Việt Trì Stadium; Attendance: 3,019; Referee: Resul Mammedov (Turkmenistan)

6 September 2025 2026 AFC U23 Q	Bangladesh	0–1	Yemen	Việt Trì, Vietnam
16:00 BST (UTC+6)		Report	Al-Awami 90+4'	Stadium: Việt Trì Stadium; Attendance: 365; Referee: Amir Arab Baraghi (Iran)

9 September 2025 2026 AFC U23 Q	Singapore	1–4	Bangladesh	Việt Trì, Vietnam
16:00 BST (UTC+6)	Khairin 90+1'	Report	Fahamedul 70'; Al-Amin 73'; Mohsin 80'; Morsalin 83'	Stadium: Việt Trì Stadium; Attendance: 459; Referee: Resul Mämmedow (Turkmenistan)

== Under-20 football team ==
=== Friendlies game ===
5 December 2025 Latin–Bangla; Super Cup	Rising Stars	0–4	(Brazil) São Bernardo U20	Dhaka, Bangladesh
19:00 BST (UTC+6)				Stadium: National Stadium

8 December 2025 Latin–Bangla; Super Cup	Rising Stars	1–1	(Argentina) Atletico Charlone U20	Dhaka, Bangladesh
19:00 BST (UTC+6)				Stadium: National Stadium

=== 2026 SAFF U-20 Championship ===
Group B

Pos	Team	Pld	W	D	L	GF	GA	GD	Pts	Qualification
1	India	2	1	1	0	4	1	+3	4	Advanced to the Semi-finals
2	Bangladesh	2	1	1	0	3	1	+2	4	Advanced to the Semi-finals
3	Pakistan	2	0	0	2	0	5	−5	0	

Source: Sofascore

24 March 2026 2026 SAFF U20 GS	Bangladesh	2–0	Pakistan	Malé, Maldives
16:45 BST (UTC+6)	R. Sullivan 53', 72'	Report		Stadium: National Football Stadium; Attendance: 2,550; Referee: M. Rideewita W. C. (Sri Lanka)

28 March 2026 2026 SAFF U20 GS	Bangladesh	1–1	India	Malé, Maldives
16:45 BST (UTC+6)	Riyad 45+10'	Report	V. Yadav 17'	Stadium: National Football Stadium; Attendance: 3,932; Referee: Raeef Rauf (Maldives)

1 April 2026 2026 SAFF U20 SF	Nepal	0–1	Bangladesh	Malé, Maldives
16:45 BST (UTC+6)		Report	Manik 10'	Stadium: National Football Stadium; Attendance: 3,910; Referee: Jatinder Singh (India)

3 April 2026 2026 SAFF U20 Final	India	0–0 (4–3 p)	Bangladesh	Malé, Maldives
21:00 BST (UTC+6)		Report		Stadium: National Football Stadium; Attendance: 4,100; Referee: Umesh Bidari (Nepal)
	Penalties
	Murshed (penalty scored); Chandon (penalty scored); Fahim (penalty scored); Raksam (penalty missed); R. Sullivan (penalty scored)		(penalty missed) Rishi; (penalty scored) Arbash; (penalty scored) Samson; (penalty scored) Vishal; (penalty missed) Dodum

== Under-17 football team ==
=== 2025 SAFF U-17 Championship ===
Group A

Pos	Team	Pld	W	D	L	GF	GA	GD	Pts	Qualification
1	Bangladesh	2	2	0	0	8	0	+8	6	Qualified for Knockout stage
2	Nepal	2	1	0	1	2	4	−2	3	Qualified for Knockout stage
3	Sri Lanka (H)	2	0	0	2	0	6	−6	0	

Source: SAFF
(H) Hosts

18 September 2025 2025 SAFF U17 GS	Bangladesh	4–0	Nepal	Colombo, Sri Lanka
19:30 BST (UTC+6)	Sabbir 30'; Opu 49'; Arif 50'; Manik 65'	Report		Stadium: Colombo Racecourse; Attendance: 179; Referee: Afsheen Naseer (Maldives)

21 September 2025 2025 SAFF U17 GS	Bangladesh	4–0	Sri Lanka	Colombo, Sri Lanka
19:30 BST (UTC+6)	Arif 18'; Rifat 48', 63', 89'	Report		Stadium: Colombo Racecourse; Attendance: 1,742; Referee: Pema Tshewang (Bhutan)

25 September 2025 2025 SAFF U17 SF	Bangladesh	2–0	Pakistan	Colombo, Sri Lanka
15:30 BST (UTC+6)	Faysal 2'; Opu 4'	Report		Stadium: Colombo Racecourse; Attendance: 157; Referee: Pema Tshewang (Bhutan)

27 September 2025 2025 SAFF U17 Final	Bangladesh	2–2 (1–4 p)	India	Colombo, Sri Lanka
18:30 BST (UTC+6)	M. Manik 24'; Riduan 90+7'	Report	Gangte 4'; A. Shah 38'	Stadium: Colombo Racecourse; Attendance: 374; Referee: Pema Tshewang (Bhutan)
	Penalties
	Ikramul (penalty missed); Azam (penalty missed); M. Manik (penalty scored)		(penalty scored) Gangte; (penalty scored) K. Meitei; (penalty scored) R. Magar; (penalty scored) Poonia

=== 2026 AFC U-17 Asian Cup qualification ===
Group A

Pos	Team	Pld	W	D	L	GF	GA	GD	Pts	Qualification
1	China (H)	5	5	0	0	42	0	+42	15	Final tournament
2	Bangladesh	5	4	0	1	20	5	+15	12	
3	Bahrain	5	3	0	2	16	7	+9	9	
4	Timor-Leste	5	2	0	3	4	23	−19	6	
5	Sri Lanka	5	1	0	4	6	17	−11	3	
6	Brunei	5	0	0	5	0	36	−36	0	

Source: AFC
Rules for classification: Qualification tiebreakers
(H) Hosts

22 November 2025 2026 AFC U17 Q	Bangladesh	5–0	Timor-Leste	Chongqing, China
12:00 BST (UTC+6)	Kazi 11'; Manik 28', 43'; Bostami 49'; Ahmmed 88'	Report		Stadium: Tongliang Long Stadium

24 November 2025 2026 AFC U17 Q	Bangladesh	8–0	Brunei	Chongqing, China
12:00 BST (UTC+6)	Rahman 13', 49'; Kazi 23', 73'; Faysal 36'; Manik 37'; Ahmmed 75'; Arif 79'	Report		Stadium: Yongchuan Sports Center

26 November 2025 2026 AFC U17 Q	Sri Lanka	0–5	Bangladesh	Chongqing, China
12:00 BST (UTC+6)		Report	Islam 24'; Manik 29'; Faysal 64', 90+1'; Bostami 90'	Stadium: Tongliang Long Stadium

28 November 2025 2026 AFC U17 Q	Bangladesh	2–1	Bahrain	Chongqing, China
13:00 BST (UTC+6)	Bostami 59'; Manik 72'	Report	Zuhair 85'	Stadium: Yongchuan Sports Center

30 November 2025 2026 AFC U17 Q	China	4–0	Bangladesh	Chongqing, China
17:35 BST (UTC+6)	Shuai Weihao 8', 38', 53'; Zhao Songyuan 89'	Report		Stadium: Tongliang Long Stadium; Attendance: 15,291; Referee: Yahya Al-Balushi (Oman)

== Men's futsal teams ==
Bangladesh futsal football team

=== 2026 AFC Futsal Asian Cup qualification ===
Group G

Pos	Team	Pld	W	D	L	GF	GA	GD	Pts	Qualification
1	Iran	3	3	0	0	26	0	+26	9	Final tournament
2	Malaysia (H)	3	2	0	1	8	5	+3	6	Final tournament
3	United Arab Emirates	3	1	0	2	8	13	−5	3	
4	Bangladesh	3	0	0	3	3	27	−24	0	

Source: AFC
Rules for classification: Qualification tiebreakers
(H) Hosts

20 September 2025 2026 AFC Futsal Q.	Iran	12–0	Bangladesh	Kuantan, Malaysia
14:00 BST (UTC+6)		Report		Stadium: Stadium Tertutup Sukpa

22 September 2025 2026 AFC Futsal Q.	Bangladesh	1–7	Malaysia	Kuantan, Malaysia
18:00 BST (UTC+6)		Report		Stadium: Stadium Tertutup Sukpa

24 September 2025 2026 AFC Futsal Q.	Emirates	8–2	Bangladesh	Kuantan, Malaysia
14:00 BST (UTC+6)		Report		Stadium: Stadium Tertutup Sukpa

=== 2026 SAFF Futsal Championship ===
Group stage

Pos	Team	Pld	W	D	L	GF	GA	GD	Pts	Result	MDV	IND	NEP	PAK	BAN	SRI	BHU
1	Maldives (C)	6	6	0	0	28	6	+22	18	Champions		5–0	2–1		6–1		
2	India	6	3	2	1	26	17	+9	11	Runners-up			3–3	4–1	4–4		
3	Nepal	6	3	2	1	18	12	+6	11	Third-place							
4	Pakistan	6	3	1	2	20	20	0	10		1–7		4–4			5–2	4–2
5	Bangladesh	6	2	1	3	16	21	−5	7				1–4	1–5		5–1	4–1
6	Sri Lanka	6	0	1	5	10	24	−14	1		2–5	1–4	1–2				3–3
7	Bhutan	6	0	1	5	11	29	−18	1		1–3	3–11	1–4				

Source: GSA
Legend: Blue = home team win; Yellow = draw; Red = away team win.
(C) Champions

14 January 2026 SAFF Futsal Championship	India	4–4	Bangladesh	Bangkok, Thailand
16:30	Anmol Adhikari 12'; Lalsawmpuia 20'; K Roluahpuia 27', 36'	Report	Md Moin Ahmed 9', 31'; Rahbar Khan 16', 37'	Stadium: Nonthaburi Stadium; Attendance: 70; Referee: Chris Sinclair (England)

16 January 2026 SAFF Futsal Championship	Maldives	6–1	Bangladesh	Bangkok, Thailand
19:00	Mohamed Imran 1'; Ishan Ibrahim 9'; Ahmed Rahil Rasheed 10', 31'; Ali Shiyah 16' (pen.); Abdulla Shafiu 40'	Report	Kazi Ibrahim Ahamed 20'	Stadium: Hua Mak Stadium; Attendance: 100; Referee: Ali Ahmadi (Iran)

18 January 2026 SAFF Futsal Championship	Bangladesh	4–1	Bhutan	Bangkok, Thailand
19:00	Md Moin Ahmed 5', 10'; Md Foysal Hossain 35'; Kazi Ibrahim Ahamed 36'	Report	Kinga Wingchuk 29'	Stadium: Nonthaburi Stadium; Attendance: 85; Referee: Chris Sinclair (England)

20 January 2026 SAFF Futsal Championship	Bangladesh	5–1	Sri Lanka	Bangkok, Thailand
19:00	Rahbar Khan 4', 19'; Moin Ahmed 22'; Tajware Bin Kashem 34'; Abir Hossain 39'	Report	Mohamed Aman 5'	Stadium: Nonthaburi Stadium; Attendance: 51; Referee: Nattakit Hintua (Thailand)

22 January 2026 SAFF Futsal Championship	Bangladesh	1–5	Pakistan	Bangkok, Thailand
16:30	Fayed Azim 36'	Report	Ali Agha 18', 40'; Zaid Ullah Khan 31', 40'; Salar Ahmed Khan 37'	Stadium: Nonthaburi Stadium; Attendance: 23; Referee: Chris Sinclair (New Zealand)

24 January 2026 SAFF Futsal Championship	Bangladesh	1–4	Nepal	Bangkok, Thailand
14:00	Rahbar Khan 34'	Report	Lakpa Tamang 14'; Saroj Tamang 29'; Sanje Syangtan 35'; Bikrant Narsingh Rana 37'	Stadium: Nonthaburi Stadium; Attendance: 36; Referee: Khamprasong Xayavongsy (Laos)

== Women's national teams ==
=== Friendlies game ===
31 May 2025 Friendly Game	Bangladesh	0–0	Indonesia	Amman, Jordan
20:00 BST (UTC+6)		Report		Stadium: King Abdullah Stadium; Referee: Perissa Nasr (Lebanon)

3 June 2025 Friendly Game	Jordan	2–2	Bangladesh	Amman, Jordan
22:00 BST (UTC+6)	Jbarah 5'; Al Bitar 58'	Report	Shamsunnahar 43'; Ripa 81'	Stadium: King Abdullah Stadium; Referee: Heba Saadieh (Palestine)

24 October 2025 Friendly	Thailand	3–0	Bangladesh	Bangkok, Thailand
17:00 BST (UTC+6)	O. Waenngoen 1'; S. Pengngam 51'; P. Aupachai 86'	Report		Stadium: Thonburi University Stadium; Referee: Ms Bui Thi Thu Trang (Vietnam)

27 October 2025 Friendly	Thailand	5–1	Bangladesh	Bangkok, Thailand
17:00 BST (UTC+6)	Pengngam 12'; Chiraphon Mangkhaldee 23'; Madison Jett Castain 34', 54'; Mongkoldee 60' (pen.)	Report	Shamsunnahar 29'	Stadium: Thonburi University Stadium; Referee: Ms Bui Thi Thu Trang (Vietnam)

26 November 2025 Bangladesh Tri-Nations Cup	Bangladesh	0–1	Malaysia	Dhaka, Bangladesh
18:00 BST (UTC+6)		Report	Nur Ainsyah Murad 29'	Stadium: National Stadium; Referee: Om Choki (Bhutan)

2 December 2025 Bangladesh Tri-Nations Cup	Bangladesh	1–2	Azerbaijan	Dhaka, Bangladesh
18:00 BST (UTC+6)	Manda 33'	Report	Jafarzade 19'; Manya 83'	Stadium: National Stadium; Referee: Om Choki (Bhutan)

25 February 2026 Closed Door Unofficial Friendly	Bangladesh	1–1	(Australia) Western Sydney Wanderers	Sydney, Australia
03:00 BST (UTC+6)		Report

10 May 2026 Unofficial friendly	Bangladesh	2–0	(Thailand) Kasem Bundit	Bangkok, Thailand
16:00 UTC+6	Anika 15'; Umehla 77'	Report		Stadium: Alpine Football Training Camm (Pitch 1)

17 May 2026 Unofficial friendly	Bangladesh	0–2	(Thailand) Bangkok WFC	Bangkok, Thailand
16:00 UTC+6		Report		Stadium: Alpine Football Training Camm (Pitch 1)

=== 2026 AFC Women's Asian Cup qualification ===
Group C

Pos	Team	Pld	W	D	L	GF	GA	GD	Pts	Qualification
1	Bangladesh	3	3	0	0	16	1	+15	9	Final tournament
2	Myanmar (H)	3	2	0	1	15	2	+13	6	
3	Bahrain	3	0	1	2	2	15	−13	1	
4	Turkmenistan	3	0	1	2	2	17	−15	1	

Source: AFC
Rules for classification: Qualification tiebreakers
(H) Hosts

29 June 2025 2027 AWCQ	Bahrain	0–7	Bangladesh	Yangon, Myanmar
19:30 BST (UTC+6)		Report	Shamsunnahar Jr. 10'; Ritu 15'; Kohati 40'; Tohura 45+2', 45+3'; Rawan Al Ali 59' (o.g.); Munki 74'	Stadium: Thuwunna Stadium; Referee: Kanika Barman (India)

2 July 2025 2027 AWCQ	Bangladesh	2–1	Myanmar	Yangon, Myanmar
15:30 BST (UTC+6)	Ritu 19', 70'	Report	Win Win 89'	Stadium: Thuwunna Stadium; Referee: Esraa Almbaiden (Jordan)

5 July 2025 2027 AWCQ	Bangladesh	7–0	Turkmenistan	Yangon, Myanmar
19:30 BST (UTC+6)	Sapna 3'; Shamsunnahar Jr. 6', 13'; Monika 16'; Ritu 17', 40'; Tohura 20'	Report		Stadium: Thuwunna Stadium; Referee: Mu Mingxin (China)

=== 2026 AFC Women's Asian Cup ===
Group B

Pos	Team	Pld	W	D	L	GF	GA	GD	Pts	Qualification
1	China	3	3	0	0	7	1	+6	9	Advance to knockout stage
2	North Korea	3	2	0	1	9	2	+7	6	Advance to knockout stage
3	Uzbekistan	3	1	0	2	4	6	−2	3	Advance to knockout stage
4	Bangladesh	3	0	0	3	0	11	−11	0	

Source: AFC

3 March 2026 AFC Women's Asian Cup GS	China	2–0	Bangladesh	Sydney, Australia
14:00 BST (UTC+6)	Wang Shuang 44'; Zhang Rui 45+1'	Report (AFC); Report (FIFA)		Stadium: Western Sydney Stadium; Attendance: 6,006; Referee: Pansa Chaisanit (Thailand)

6 March 2026 AFC Women's Asian Cup GS	Bangladesh	0–5	North Korea	Sydney, Australia
9:00 BST (UTC+6)		Report (AFC); Report (FIFA)	Myong Yu-jong 45+5' (pen.); Kim Kyong-yong 45+7', 64'; Chae Un-yong 62'; Kim Hye-yong 90'	Stadium: Western Sydney Stadium; Attendance: 2,102; Referee: Doumouh Al Bakkar (Lebanon)

9 March 2026 AFC Women's Asian Cup GS	Bangladesh	0–4	Uzbekistan	Perth, Australia
13:00 BST (UTC+6)		Report (AFC); Report (FIFA)	Khabibullaeva 10', 62', 66'; Kudratova 88'	Stadium: Perth Rectangular Stadium; Attendance: 1,117; Referee: Mahnaz Zokaee (Iran)

=== 2026 SAFF Women's Championship ===
Group B

Pos	Team	Pld	W	D	L	GF	GA	GD	Pts	Qualification
1	India (H)	2	2	0	0	14	0	+14	6	Advance to knockout stage
2	Bangladesh	2	1	0	1	4	5	−1	3	Advance to knockout stage
3	Maldives	2	0	0	2	2	15	−13	0	

Source: SAFF
Rules for classification: 1) points; 2) head-to-head points; 3) head-to-head goal difference; 4) goal difference; 5) number of goals scored; 6) drawing of lots
(H) Hosts

29 May 2026 2026 SAFF GS	Bangladesh	4–2	Maldives	Margao, India
20:00 BST (UTC+6)	Siddiqui 1'; Marma 34'; Prity 63'; Kisku 90+5'	Report	Noora 42'; Fazla 57'	Stadium: Jawaharlal Nehru Stadium; Attendance: 127; Referee: Rachana Kamani (India)

31 May 2026 2026 SAFF GS	India	3–0	Bangladesh	Margao, India
20:00 BST (UTC+6)	Xaxa 36'; Kom 78' (pen.); Prasad 90+1'	Report		Stadium: Jawaharlal Nehru Stadium; Attendance: 553; Referee: Choki Om (Bhutan)

3 June 2026 2026 SAFF SF	Nepal	1–2	Bangladesh	Margao, India
16:30 BST (UTC+6)	Rana 22'	Report	R. Chakma 45+1'; Preeti Rai 90+3' (o.g.)	Stadium: Jawaharlal Nehru Stadium; Attendance: 289; Referee: Choki Om (Bhutan)

5 June 2026 2026 SAFF F	Bangladesh	1–3	India	Margao, India
19:00 BST (UTC+6)	R. Chakma 45+1'	Report	Xaxa 42'; Nongrum 46'; Kom 82'	Stadium: Jawaharlal Nehru Stadium; Attendance: 729; Referee: Anjana Rai (Nepal)

== Under-20 Women's teams ==
=== Friendlies game ===
25 March 2026 Closed Door Friendly	Bangladesh	1–1	India	Thailand
BST (UTC+6)	Umehla		??

27 March 2026 Closed Door Friendly	Bangladesh	2–0	Jordan	Thailand
BST (UTC+6)	Sauravi Akanda; Mamoni	Report	??

=== 2025 SAFF U-20 Women's Championship ===
Standing

Pos	Team	Pld	W	D	L	GF	GA	GD	Pts	Status
1	Bangladesh (H)	6	6	0	0	28	4	+24	18	Champions
2	Nepal	6	4	0	2	30	8	+22	12	
3	Bhutan	6	2	0	4	12	21	−9	6	
4	Sri Lanka	6	0	0	6	1	38	−37	0	

Source: SAFF
Rules for classification: (1) points; (2) head-to-head points; (3) head-to-head goal difference; (4) goal difference; (5) number of goals scored;
(H) Hosts

11 July 2025 2025 SAFF U20 Round robin	Bangladesh	9–1	Sri Lanka	Dhaka, Bangladesh
15:00 BST (UTC+6)	Sapna 2'; Munki Akhter 4', 47'; Sagorika 38', 52', 57'; Sinha Jahan Sikha 48'; Rupa Akter 84'; Shanti Mardi 90+3'	Report	Jasotharan Layansika 90+1'	Stadium: Bashundhara Kings Arena; Attendance: 1,000; Referee: Anjana Rai (Nepal)

13 July 2025 2025 SAFF U20 Round robin	Bangladesh	3–2	Nepal	Dhaka, Bangladesh
19:00 BST (UTC+6)	Anisha Rai 78' (pen.); Meena Deuba 87'	Report	Sinha Jahan Sikha 14'; Sagorika 37'; Sree Moti Trishna Rani 90+7'	Stadium: Bashundhara Kings Arena; Attendance: 3,150; Referee: Tshering Yangkhey (Bhutan)

15 July 2025 2025 SAFF U20 Round robin	Bangladesh	4–1 (Note: The match was temporarily suspended due to poor outfield.)	Bhutan	Dhaka, Bangladesh (Note: The field was changed after halftime due to poor conditions and a poor outfield. The post-match sessions were held at the adjacent Bashundhara Sports Ground.)
15:00 BST (UTC+6)	Shanti Mardi 7', 57', 79'; Munki Akhter 76'	Report	Sangay Wangmo 53'	Stadium: Bashundhara Kings Arena/Sports Ground; Attendance: 0 Referee: Rai Anjana (Nepal)

17 July 2025 2025 SAFF U20 Round robin	Bangladesh	3–0	Bhutan	Dhaka, Bangladesh (Note: Due to poor conditions and a poor outfield, the ground was changed, and the match was held at the adjacent Bashundhara Sports Ground instead. Kings Arena was the main venue as per the schedule.)
19:00 BST (UTC+6)	Sree Moti Trishna Rani 33', 66'; Sapna 75'	Report		Stadium: Bashundhara Sports Ground; Referee: Y.A. Pabasara Minisaraniyapa (Sri Lanka)

19 July 2025 2025 SAFF U20 Round robin	Sri Lanka	0–5	Bangladesh	Dhaka, Bangladesh
19:00 BST (UTC+6)		Report	Kanon Bahadur 26'; Puja Das 45+2', 74'; Sree Moti Trishna Rani 86'; Afeida 90+7'	Stadium: Bashundhara Sports Ground; Attendance: 0 Referee: Tshering Yangkhey (Bhutan)

21 July 2025 2025 SAFF U20 Round robin	Bangladesh	4–0	Nepal	Dhaka, Bangladesh
19:00 BST (UTC+6)	Sagorika 8', 52', 58', 72'	Report		Stadium: Bashundhara Kings Arena; Attendance: 5,374; Referee: Rachana Hasmukh Kamani (India)

=== 2026 SAFF U-19 Women's Championship ===
Standing

Pos	Team	Pld	W	D	L	GF	GA	GD	Pts	Qualification	BAN	IND	NEP	BHU
1	Bangladesh	3	3	0	0	18	0	+18	9	Qualified for the Final		2–0	4–0	12–0
2	India	3	2	0	1	9	2	+7	6	Qualified for the Final			1–0	8–0
3	Nepal	3	1	0	2	2	6	−4	3					2–1
4	Bhutan	3	0	0	3	1	22	−21	0					

Source: Sofascore
Legend: Blue = home team win; Yellow = draw; Red = away team win.
Rules for classification: 1) points; 2) head-to-head points; 3) head-to-head goal difference; 4) goal difference; 5) goals scored

31 January 2026 2026 SAFF U19 Round robin	Bangladesh	12–0	Bhutan	Pokhara, Nepal
12:00 (12:15 BST)	Mamoni 28'; Trishna 43', 54', 60'; Munki 44', 45+3', 81', 90+3'; Alpi 73', 86', 90+5'; Arpita 90+4'	Report		Stadium: Pokhara Rangasala; Attendance: 30; Referee: Anjana Rai (Nepal)

2 February 2026 2026 SAFF U19 Round robin	Bangladesh	2–0	India	Pokhara, Nepal
12:00 (12:15 BST)	Arpita 29'; Alpi 40'	Report		Stadium: Pokhara Rangasala; Attendance: 250; Referee: Om Choki (Bhutan)

7 February 2026 2026 SAFF U19 Round robin	Bangladesh	4–0	Nepal	Pokhara, Nepal
15:00 (15:15 BST)	Protima 3'; Alpi 45+4', 67', 82'	Report		Stadium: Pokhara Rangasala; Attendance: 340; Referee: Mahi Tudu (India)

7 February 2026 2026 SAFF U19 Final match	Bangladesh	0–4	India	Pokhara, Nepal
15:00 (15:15 BST)		Report	Nongmaithem 42'; Lakra 63' (pen.); P. Fernandes 68'; Raghuraman 83'	Stadium: Pokhara Rangasala; Attendance: 250; Referee: Om Choki (Bhutan)

=== 2026 AFC U-20 Women's Asian Cup qualification ===
Group H

Pos	Team	Pld	W	D	L	GF	GA	GD	Pts	Qualification
1	South Korea	3	3	0	0	16	1	+15	9	Final tournament
2	Bangladesh	3	2	0	1	12	7	+5	6	Final tournament
3	Laos (H)	3	1	0	2	3	4	−1	3	
4	Timor-Leste	3	0	0	3	0	19	−19	0	

Source: AFC
Rules for classification: Qualification tiebreakers
(H) Hosts

6 August 2025 2026 AFC U-20 Women's Q	Bangladesh	3–1	Laos	Vientiane, Laos
18:30 BST (UTC+6)	Sagorika 36', 90+2'; Munki 59'	Report	Keo Onsy 87'	Stadium: New Laos National Stadium; Referee: Fatemeh Nasiri (Iran)

8 August 2025 2026 AFC U-20 Women's Q	Timor-Leste	0–8	Bangladesh	Vientiane, Laos
15:00 BST (UTC+6)		Report	Sikha 20'; Shanti 33'; Sagorika 36', 73'; Trishna 45+4', 57', 82'; Munki 90+6'	Stadium: New Laos National Stadium; Referee: Roziyabonu Yusupova (Uzbekistan)

10 August 2025 2026 AFC U-20 Women's Q	South Korea	6–1	Bangladesh	Vientiane, Laos
15:00 BST (UTC+6)	Lee Ha-eun 19', 87', 90'; Cho Hye-young 48', 60'; Jin Hye-rin 90+6'	Report	Trishna 15'	Stadium: New Laos National Stadium; Referee: Anjana Rai (Nepal)

=== 2026 AFC U-20 Women's Asian Cup ===
Group A

Pos	Team	Pld	W	D	L	GF	GA	GD	Pts	Qualification
1	China	3	3	0	0	6	0	+6	9	Knockout stage
2	Thailand (H)	3	2	0	1	7	4	+3	6	Knockout stage
3	Vietnam	3	1	0	2	2	7	−5	3	Knockout stage
4	Bangladesh	3	0	0	3	2	6	−4	0	

Source: AFC
Rules for classification: Qualification tiebreakers
(H) Hosts

1 April 2026 2026 AFC U-20 Women's GS	Thailand	3–2	Bangladesh	Pathum Thani, Thailand
19:00 BST (UTC+6)	Kurisara 69' (pen.); Rinyaphat 76' (pen.); Pichayatida 79'	Report	Sagorika 36', 50'	Stadium: Thammasat Stadium; Attendance: 271; Referee: Azusa Sugino (Japan)

4 April 2026 2026 AFC U-20 Women's GS	Bangladesh	0–2	China	Bangkok, Thailand
15:00 BST (UTC+6)		Report	Yu Xingyue 47'; Wang Aifang 82'	Stadium: Rajamangala Stadium; Attendance: 110; Referee: Rawdha Almansoori (United Arab Emirates)

7 April 2026 2026 AFC U-20 Women's GS	Vietnam	1–0	Bangladesh	Bangkok, Thailand
19:00 BST (UTC+6)	Nguyễn Thị Thùy Linh 49'	Report		Stadium: Rajamangala Stadium; Attendance: 36; Referee: Yang Shu-ting (Chinese Taipei)

== Under-17 women's team ==
=== Friendlies games ===
7 October 2025 Friendly	Bangladesh	2–0	Syria	Dubai, United Arab Emirates
22:00 BST (UTC+6)	A. Akter 39', 52'	Report		Stadium: UAE Football Association Ground 1

9 October 2025 Friendly	Bangladesh	3–0	Emirates	Dubai, United Arab Emirates
22:00 BST (UTC+6)	S. Prity (?); A. Akter (?)	Report		Stadium: UAE Football Association Ground 1

=== 2025 SAFF U-17 Women's Championship ===
Standing

Pos	Team	Pld	W	D	L	GF	GA	GD	Pts	Status
1	India	6	5	0	1	30	4	+26	15	Champion
2	Bangladesh	6	4	1	1	15	8	+7	13	
3	Nepal	6	1	1	4	4	21	−17	4	
4	Bhutan (H)	6	0	2	4	4	20	−16	2	

Source: SAFF
Rules for classification: 1) points; 2) head-to-head points; 3) head-to-head goal difference; 4) goal difference; 5) number of goals scored;
(H) Hosts

20 August 2025 2025 SAFF U17 Round robin	Bangladesh	3–1	Bhutan	Thimphu, Bhutan
18:00 BST (UTC+6)	Prity 45+3'; Akter 54', 65'	Report	Choden 61'	Stadium: Changlimithang Stadium; Referee: Kriti Sen (Nepal)

22 August 2025 2025 SAFF U17 Round robin	Bangladesh	0–2	India	Thimphu, Bhutan
15:00 BST (UTC+6)		Report	Fernandes 14'; Shullai 76'	Stadium: Changlimithang Stadium; Referee: Pabasara Minisarani Yapa (Sri Lanka)

24 August 2025 2025 SAFF U17 Round robin	Bangladesh	3–0	Nepal	Thimphu, Bhutan
18:00 BST (UTC+6)	Thuinuye 41'; Sauravi 45'; Reya 90+2'	Report		Stadium: Changlimithang Stadium; Referee: Meera Tamang (Bhutan)

27 August 2025 2025 SAFF U17 Round robin	Bangladesh	4–1	Nepal	Thimphu, Bhutan
15:00 BST (UTC+6)	Thuinuye 38'; Prity 45', 71', 86'	Report	Bhumika 47'	Stadium: Changlimithang Stadium; Referee: Neetu Rana (India)

29 August 2025 2025 SAFF U17 Round robin	Bangladesh	1–1	Bhutan	Thimphu, Bhutan
15:00 BST (UTC+6)	Purnima 6'	Report	Zangmo 45+1'	Stadium: Changlimithang Stadium; Referee: Kriti Sen (Nepal)

31 August 2025 2025 SAFF U17 Round robin	Bangladesh	4–3	India	Thimphu, Bhutan
15:00 BST (UTC+6)	Purnima 1'; Alpi 34'; Prity 49', 90+5'	Report	Anushka 9'; Pritika 65'; Nongmaithem 89'	Stadium: Changlimithang Stadium; Referee: Meera Tamang (Bhutan)

=== 2026 AFC U-17 Women's Asian Cup qualification ===
Group H

Pos	Team	Pld	W	D	L	GF	GA	GD	Pts	Qualification
1	Chinese Taipei	2	2	0	0	11	1	+10	6	Final tournament
2	Jordan (H)	2	0	1	1	2	7	−5	1	
3	Bangladesh	2	0	1	1	1	6	−5	1	

Source: AFC
Rules for classification: Qualification tiebreakers
(H) Hosts

13 October 2025 2026 AFC U-17 Women's Q	Jordan	1–1	Bangladesh	Aqaba, Jordan
21:00 BST (UTC+6)	Jarrar 89'	Report	Prity 3'	Stadium: Aqaba Stadium; Referee: Khin Nyein Chan (Myanmar)

17 October 2025 2026 AFC U-17 Women's Q	Bangladesh	0–5	Chinese Taipei	Aqaba, Jordan
21:00 BST (UTC+6)		Report	Woo Cai-Xuan 6'; Chung Yun-Chien 33'; Yang Yi-Ai 66'; Wu Yen-Yu 90+1'; Hsiao Yu-Hui 90+3'	Stadium: Aqaba Stadium; Attendance: Ananthip Phophan (Thailand)

== Women's futsal teams ==
Bangladesh women's national futsal team

=== SAFF Women's Futsal Championship ===
Group stage

Pos	Team	Pld	W	D	L	GF	GA	GD	Pts	Result	BAN	IND	BHU	NEP	PAK	SRI	MDV
1	Bangladesh (C)	6	5	1	0	38	10	+28	16	Champions		3–1	3–3	3–0	9–1	6–3	14–2
2	India	6	4	0	2	31	12	+19	12	Runners-up				8–1	5–3		
3	Bhutan	6	3	2	1	18	13	+5	11	Third-place		2–1				5–1	4–2
4	Nepal	6	3	1	2	18	17	+1	10				5–3		5–1		
5	Pakistan	6	2	1	3	12	23	−11	7				1–1			3–2	
6	Sri Lanka	6	1	1	4	17	27	−10	4			2–5		2–2			7–6
7	Maldives	6	0	0	6	12	44	−32	0			1–11		0–5	1–3		

Source: Matchfoari
Legend: Blue = home team win; Yellow = draw; Red = away team win.
(C) Champions

15 January 2026 SAFF Women's Futsal Championship	Bangladesh	3–1	India	Bangkok, Thailand
15:00 BST (UTC+6)	Sabina 7', 13'; Sumaya 31'	Report	Arya Dhanaji More 37'	Stadium: Hua Mak Stadium; Attendance: 50; Referee: Benjapol Mucharoensap (Thailand)

17 January 2026 SAFF Women's Futsal Championship	Bangladesh	3–3	Bhutan	Bangkok, Thailand
15:00 BST (UTC+6)	Sumaya 7'; Sabina 35'; Parvin 36'	Report	Deki Lhazom 3'; Sonam Lhamo 27', 30'	Stadium: Nonthaburi Stadium; Attendance: 63; Referee: Vaja Vishal Mahendrabhai (India)

19 January 2026 SAFF Women's Futsal Championship	Bangladesh	3–0	Nepal	Bangkok, Thailand
15:00 BST (UTC+6)	Sabina 14'; Krishna 19'; Lipi Akter 33'	Report		Stadium: Nonthaburi Stadium; Attendance: 50; Referee: Mohammad Javad Ehtesham (Iran)

21 January 2026 SAFF Women's Futsal Championship	Bangladesh	6–3	Sri Lanka	Bangkok, Thailand
15:00 BST (UTC+6)	Sabina 18', 20'; Sumaya 29'; Krishna 36', 40'; Parvin 38'	Report	Shanu Paskaran 13'; Imesha Warnakulasuriya 16', 40'	Stadium: Nonthaburi Stadium; Attendance: 43; Referee: Nicholas Backo (Australia)

23 January 2026 SAFF Women's Futsal Championship	Bangladesh	9–1	Pakistan	Bangkok, Thailand
15:00 BST (UTC+6)	Sabina 8', 16', 34', 40'; Nila 10'; Nouson Jahan 10', 12'; Krishna 16', 32'	Report	Anmool Hira 33'	Stadium: Nonthaburi Stadium; Attendance: 50; Referee: Nicholas Backo (Australia)

25 January 2026 SAFF Women's Futsal Championship	Bangladesh	14–2	Maldives	Bangkok, Thailand
15:00 BST (UTC+6)	Sabina 10', 14', 23', 30'; Lipi Akter 17', 18', 32'; Krishna 17', 34'; Sumaya 24'; Nila 31'; Mehenur Akhter 32'; Parvin 36'		Raniya Ibrahim 4'; Mariyam Noora 40'	Stadium: Hua Mak Stadium

== Men's clubs league ==
Bangladesh Football League

League table

Pos	Team	Pld	W	D	L	GF	GA	GD	Pts	Qualification or relegation
1	Bashundhara Kings (Note: Bashundhara Kings and Dhaka Abahani will not be able to participate in the AFC Challenge League due to the risk of FIFA sanctions and the lack of an AFC club license.) (C)	18	12	5	1	42	18	+24	41	
2	Dhaka Abahani	18	11	4	3	37	15	+22	37	
3	Fortis	18	10	5	3	31	13	+18	35	Qualification for the AFC; Challenge League qualifying stage
4	Bangladesh Police	18	6	9	3	19	15	+4	27	Qualification for the AFC; Challenge League qualifying stage
5	Mohammedan	18	6	5	7	27	20	+7	23	
6	Rahmatganj	18	6	5	7	21	25	−4	23	
7	Brothers Union	18	4	5	9	18	29	−11	17	
8	PWD	18	4	5	9	15	28	−13	17	
9	Arambagh	18	3	5	10	12	28	−16	14	
10	Fakirerpool	18	2	4	12	13	44	−31	10	

Source: Soccerway
Rules for classification: 1) Points; 2) Goal difference; 3) Number of goals scored.
(C) Champion
Notes:

Bangladesh Championship League

League table

Pos	Team	Pld	W	D	L	GF	GA	GD	Pts	BPL
1	Chattogram City	18	13	3	2	32	11	+21	42	Qualification to 2026–27 BFL
2	City Club	18	10	6	2	32	7	+25	36	Qualification to 2026–27 BFL
3	Dhaka Wanderers	18	8	5	5	25	18	+7	29	Qualification to 2026–27 BFL
4	BRTC SC	18	7	6	5	21	14	+7	27	
5	Suktara JS	18	7	4	7	29	30	−1	25	
6	Khelaghor SKS	18	6	6	6	21	18	+3	24	
7	Dhaka Rangers (Note: Dhaka Rangers fielded an overage player in the category requiring each team to include one U-18 player in their starting XI during their 2–0 victory against Chattogram City on 9 April 2026. As a result, the Bangladesh Football Federation (BFF) imposed a Taka 30,000 fine and awarded a 3–0 win to their opponents.)	18	6	5	7	23	24	−1	23	
8	Wari Club	18	5	6	7	25	22	+3	21	
9	Little Friends	18	3	3	12	16	43	−27	12	Relegation to 2026–27 DSDL
10	Chattogram Abahani	18	2	2	14	10	47	−37	8	Relegation to 2026–27 DSDL

Source: Sofascore
Rules for classification: 1 Points; (2) Goal difference; (3) Goals scored;
Notes:

Dhaka Senior Division League

League table

Pos	Team	Pld	W	D	L	GF	GA	GD	Pts	Qualification or relegation
1	Jatrabari KC	16	12	4	0	36	6	+30	40	Qualification for the 2026–27 BCL
2	Mohakhali Ekadosh	16	11	3	2	41	16	+25	36	Qualification for the 2026–27 BCL
3	Sadharan Bima	16	11	3	2	29	15	+14	36	
4	Kashaituly SKP	16	9	4	3	26	9	+17	31	
5	Friend Social Welfare	16	9	4	3	30	14	+16	31	
6	Dhaka United	16	8	3	5	21	14	+7	27	
7	Basabo TS	16	5	5	6	19	22	−3	20	
8	NoFeL	16	4	7	5	18	17	+1	19	
9	Badda Jagoroni	16	4	6	6	23	23	0	18	
10	East End	16	4	6	6	13	15	−2	18	
11	Bangladesh Boys	16	5	2	9	8	14	−6	17	
12	Swadhinata KS	16	4	5	7	15	23	−8	17	
13	Arambagh FA	16	4	4	8	18	27	−9	16	
14	Siddique Bazar	16	5	1	10	20	37	−17	16	
15	Somaj Kallyan	16	4	3	9	15	24	−9	15	
16	Nobabpur KC	16	3	2	11	8	30	−22	11	Relegation to the 2026–27 Second Division League
17	T&T Club	16	2	2	12	11	45	−34	8	Relegation to the 2026–27 Second Division League

Source: Sofascore
Rules for classification: (1) Points; (2) Goal difference; (3) Goals scored;

Dhaka Second Division Football League

League table

Pos	Team	Pld	W	D	L	GF	GA	GD	Pts	Qualification
1	BKSP FT	13	9	3	1	23	11	+12	30	Qualification for the 2026–27 Senior Division League
2	Purbachal Parishad	13	8	4	1	35	6	+29	28	Qualification for the 2026–27 Senior Division League
3	Gouripur SC	13	7	3	3	20	10	+10	24	
4	Chakwkbazar Kings	13	5	5	3	14	10	+4	20	
5	Tongi KC	13	5	5	3	17	12	+5	20	
6	Jabid Ahsan Sohel KC	13	5	4	4	21	20	+1	19	
7	Kingstar SC	13	5	4	4	21	19	+2	19	
8	Dilkusha SC	13	5	3	5	18	13	+5	18	
9	Victoria SC	13	4	3	6	14	19	−5	15	
10	Jatrabari JS	13	2	6	5	13	19	−6	12	
11	BG Press S&RC	13	3	3	7	9	17	−8	12	
12	Khilgaon FA	13	2	5	6	5	17	−12	11	
13	Kallol Sangha	13	2	4	7	11	24	−13	10	Relegation to Third Division League
14	Elias Ahmed Chowdhury SS	13	1	4	8	4	28	−24	7	Relegation to Third Division League

Source: Sofascore

== Women's clubs league ==
Bangladesh Women's Football League

League table

Pos	Team	Pld	W	D	L	GF	GA	GD	Pts	Qualification
1	Rajshahi Stars	10	10	0	0	90	0	+90	30	Qualification to the 2026–27 AFC Women's Champions League and 2026 SAFF Women's Club Championship
2	Farashganj SC	10	9	0	1	70	4	+66	27	
3	Bangladesh Army	10	8	0	2	68	5	+63	24	
4	Bangladesh Police	10	6	1	3	46	15	+31	19	
5	Saddapuskuruni	10	5	1	4	33	30	+3	16	
6	BKSP FC	10	4	2	4	34	15	+19	14	
7	Ansar & VDP	10	3	3	4	31	27	+4	12	
8	Dhaka Rangers	10	3	0	7	15	55	−40	9	
9	Siraj Srity	10	2	1	7	12	47	−35	7	
10	Nasrin SA	10	1	0	9	12	88	−76	3	
11	Kacharipara Akadas	10	0	0	10	4	129	−125	0	

Source: Sofascore

== Futsal clubs league ==
Bangladesh Men's Futsal League

League table

Pos	Team	Pld	W	D	L	GF	GA	GD	Pts
1	IM 10 FC	12	10	2	0	76	23	+53	32
2	Fakir FC	13	10	1	2	87	40	+47	31
3	Techvill FC	12	9	1	2	67	27	+40	28
4	Bangladesh Army	11	6	1	4	50	25	+25	19
5	Xenon FC	10	6	0	4	38	33	+5	18
6	Chandpur FC	10	3	2	5	48	50	−2	11
7	BKSP	10	3	2	5	41	50	−9	11
8	Sports Field	10	4	0	6	36	51	−15	12
9	Dhaka AC	10	1	2	7	22	54	−32	5
10	Ansar & VDP	10	1	1	8	21	61	−40	4
11	Warrior Sports	10	0	0	10	17	89	−72	0

Source: BFF

Grand Final

13 September 2026
8:00 PM
Grand Final

IM 10 FC	2–1	Fakir FC
	Report

Shaheed Suhrawardy Indoor Stadium, Mirpur, Dhaka

Bangladesh Women's Futsal League

League table

Pos	Team	Pld	W	D	L	GF	GA	GD	Pts
1	IM 10 FC	12	12	0	0	137	16	+121	36
2	Bangladesh Army	13	9	1	3	124	41	+83	28
3	Techvill FC	11	8	0	3	68	18	+50	24
4	BKSP	10	7	1	2	87	26	+61	22
5	Ansar & VDP	10	6	0	4	53	49	+4	18
6	Warrior Sports	10	5	0	5	52	50	+2	15
7	Fakir FC	10	3	0	7	31	48	−17	9
8	Xenon FC	10	3	0	7	27	58	−31	9
9	Chandpur FC	10	1	1	8	13	66	−53	4
10	Sports Field	10	1	1	8	18	99	−81	4
11	Dhaka AC	10	1	0	9	15	154	−139	3

Source: BFF

Grand Final

13 September 2026
5:30 PM
Grand Final

IM 10 FC	5–3	Bangladesh Army
	Report

Shaheed Suhrawardy Indoor Stadium, Mirpur, Dhaka

== Cup competitions ==
=== Bangladesh Challenge Cup ===
Bashundhara Kings is the current edition champions of the cup who beat Mohammedan SC by 4–1 goals on 19 September 2025.

Match

19 September 2025
14:30 BST (UTC+6)

Mohammedan SC	1–4	Bashundhara Kings
M. Muzaffarov 15' (pen.)	Report	Dorielton 8' (pen.), 86'; R. Augusto 72'; S. Emmanuel 74'

Shaheed Dhirendranath Datta Stadium, Comilla
Referee: Md Saymoon Hasan Sany
Man of the Match: Raphael Augusto (Bashundhara Kings)

=== 2025–26 Federation Cup ===
Groups stage

Group A

Pos	Team	Pld	W	D	L	GF	GA	GD	Pts	Qualification
1	Brothers Union	4	3	1	0	5	0	+5	10	Qualified for QRF 1
2	Rahmatganj	4	1	3	0	3	1	+2	6	Advanced to QRF 2
3	PWD SC	4	2	0	2	3	5	−2	6	
4	Dhaka Abahani	4	1	1	2	5	5	0	4	
5	Fakirerpool	4	0	1	3	2	7	−5	1	

Source: Sofascore

Group B

Pos	Team	Pld	W	D	L	GF	GA	GD	Pts	Qualification
1	Bashundhara Kings	4	2	2	0	10	2	+8	8	Qualified for QRF 1
2	Mohammedan SC	4	2	2	0	8	3	+5	8	Advanced to QRF 2
3	Bangladesh Police	4	2	0	2	6	8	−2	6	
4	Fortis FC	4	1	2	1	7	4	+3	5	
5	Arambagh KS	4	0	0	4	0	14	−14	0	

Source: Sofascore

Knockout stage

Bracket

QRF 1
Brothers Union	0
Bashundhara Kings	4
QRF 2
Rahmatganj MFS	0
Mohammedan SC	3

QRF 3
Brothers Union	1
Mohammedan SC	2

Final
Bashundhara Kings	3
Mohammedan SC	2

Final match

20 May 2026
17:40

Bashundhara Kings	3–2	Mohammedan SC
Dorielton 9' (pen.), 49', 79'	Report	M. Muzaffarov 5'; Sourav Dewan 34'

Bashundhara Kings Arena, Dhaka
Referee: Mahmud Zamal Faruqee Nahid

=== 2025–26 Independence Cup ===
This season's competition has been canceled or will not be held.

=== 2025–26 Super Cup ===
This season's competition has been canceled or will not be held.

== Club Competitions (Continental) ==
=== AFC Challenge League ===
==== Preliminary stage ====
12 August 2025 2025–26 AFC CL PO	Abahani LTD (Bangladesh)	0–2	(Kyrgyzstan) Muras	Dhaka, Bangladesh
17:30 BST (UTC+6)		AFC Report; GSA Report	Djumaşev 48', 90+2'	Stadium: National Stadium; Attendance: 3,628; Referee: Torphong Somsing (Thailand)

12 August 2025 2025–26 AFC CL PO	Karamah (Syria)	0–1	(Bangladesh) Bashundhara	Doha, Qatar (Note: Al-Karamah was played their home match at Suheim bin Hamad Stadium, Doha (Qatar), instead of their regular home stadium Khalid ibn al-Walid Stadium, Homs.)
23:30 BST (UTC+6)		AFC Report; GSA Report	Sunday 6'	Stadium: Suheim bin Hamad Stadium; Attendance: 2,667; Referee: Firdavs Norsafarov (Uzbekistan)

==== Group stage ====
Group B

Pos	Team	Pld	W	D	L	GF	GA	GD	Pts	Qualification	ALK	ALA	ASB	BSK
1	Al-Kuwait (H)	3	2	1	0	6	3	+3	7	Advance to Quarter-finals		3–2	1–1	2–0
2	(Lebanon) Al-Ansar	3	2	0	1	7	4	+3	6	Advance to Quarter-finals			2–1	3–0
3	(Oman) Al-Seeb	3	1	1	1	5	5	0	4					3–2
4	(Bangladesh) Bashundhara Kings	3	0	0	3	2	8	−6	0					

Source: AFC
Rules for classification: Tiebreakers
(H) Hosts

25 October 2025 AFC Challenge League GS	Al Seeb (Oman)	3–2	(Bangladesh) Bashundhara	Sulaibikhat, Kuwait
19:00 BST (UTC+6)	Al-Rawahi 7'; Al-Aghbari 60'; Al-Muqbali 77'	AFC Report; GSA Report	Augusto 41'; Rakib 53'	Stadium: Jaber Al-Mubarak Al-Hamad Stadium; Attendance: 2,840; Referee: Wong Wai Lun (Hong Kong)

28 October 2025 AFC Challenge League GS	Bashundhara (Bangladesh)	0–3	(Lebanon) Al Ansar	Sulaibikhat, Kuwait
19:00 BST (UTC+6)		AFC Report; GSA Report	Akuki 43'; Khalfallah 76' (pen.); Hebous 90+3'	Stadium: Jaber Al-Mubarak Al-Hamad Stadium; Attendance: 314; Referee: Khash-Erdene Bold (Mongolia)

31 October 2025 AFC Challenge League GS	Bashundhara (Bangladesh)	0–2	Al Kuwait	Sulaibikhat, Kuwait
22:00 BST (UTC+6)		AFC Report; GSA Report	Nasser 1'; Khenissi 45+3'	Stadium: Jaber Al-Mubarak Al-Hamad Stadium; Attendance: 1,971; Referee: Zayniddin Alimov (Kyrgyzstan)

== Women's Club Competitions (Sub-Continental) ==
=== SAFF Club Women's Championship ===
==== Round robin stage ====
Pos	Team	Pld	W	D	L	GF	GA	GD	Pts	Qualification	(India) EAB	(Nepal) APF	(Bhutan) TRU	(Pakistan) KAC	(Bangladesh) NAS
1	(India) East Bengal (C)	4	3	1	0	13	0	+13	10	Advance to final		0–0		2–0	
2	(Nepal) APF (H)	4	2	2	0	5	0	+5	8	Advance to final			0–0	1–0	
3	(Bhutan) Transport United	4	0	3	1	1	5	−4	3		0–4				1–1
4	(Pakistan) Karachi City	4	0	2	2	0	3	−3	2				0–0		0–0
5	(Bangladesh) Nasrin	4	0	2	2	1	12	−11	2		0–7	0–4			

Source: SAFF
Legend: Blue = home team win; Yellow = draw; Red = away team win.
Rules for classification: Qualification tiebreakers
(C) Champions; (H) Hosts

==== Matches ====
5 December 2025 SAFF Club Championship RR	Nasrin (Bangladesh)	0–4	(Nepal) APF	Kathmandu, Nepal
18:15 BST (UTC+6)		Report	Ghising 38', 80'; Deuba 70', 90+1'	Stadium: Dasharath Rangasala; Attendance: 3,523; Referee: Keomany Phengmeuagkhoun (Laos); Man of the Match: Rashmi Kumari Ghising (APF)

8 December 2025 SAFF Club Championship RR	Nasrin (Bangladesh)	0–0	(Pakistan) Karachi City	Kathmandu, Nepal
18:15 BST (UTC+6)		Report		Stadium: Dasharath Rangasala; Attendance: 211; Referee: Yapa A Pabasara Minisarani (Sri Lanka)

14 December 2025 SAFF Club Championship RR	Nasrin (Bangladesh)	0–7	(India) East Bengal	Kathmandu, Nepal
18:15 BST (UTC+6)		Report	Ikwaput 7', 26', 45', 74', 90'; Chouhan 45+1'; Raul 73'	Stadium: Dasharath Rangasala; Attendance: 299; Referee: Keomany Phengmeuagkhoun (Laos)

17 December 2025 SAFF Club Championship RR	United (Bhutan)	1–1	(Bangladesh) Nasrin	Kathmandu, Nepal
14:15 BST (UTC+6)	Tshering 38'	Report	Prity 87'	Stadium: Dasharath Rangasala; Attendance: 203; Referee: Zin Mar Oo (Myanmar)

== See also ==
- 2025–26 in Indian football
