= 2024–25 Bangladesh Championship League =

13th Professional season of Bangladesh Championship League

Bangladesh Championship League
- Season: 2024–25
- Dates: 9 March–22 May 2025
- Champions: PWD Sports Club
- Promoted: PWD Sports Club; Arambagh KS
- Relegated: Uttar Baridhara Club; Farashganj SC
- Matches: 90
- Goals: 201 (2.23 per match)
- Best player: Minhazul Karim Shadin (PWD SC)
- Top goalscorer: Faisal Ahmed Shitol (Uttar Baridhara); Minhazul Karim Shadin (PWD SC) (8 goals each)
- Best goalkeeper: Md Anik Ahamed (PWD SC)
- Highest scoring: BRTC SC 4–4 Arambagh KS (19 May 2025)
- Longest winning run: 9 Matches; PWD SC
- Longest unbeaten run: 10 Matches; PWD SC
- Longest winless run: 15 Matches; BFF Football Academy
- Longest losing run: 4 Matches; BFF Football Academy; Farashganj SC

The 2024–25 Bangladesh Championship League, also known as the ABG Bashundhara Bangladesh Championship League for sponsorship reasons, was the 13th season of the Bangladesh Championship League, Bangladesh's second-tier professional football league.

Fakirerpool Young Men's Club are the defending champions having won league title in the 2023–24 season.

== Venues ==
The matches was played at these three venues across the country.

Dhaka	Dhaka	Gazipur
Bashundhara Kings Arena Practice Ground	Fortis Ground	Shaheed Barkat Stadium
Capacity: 1,000	Capacity: 1,000	Capacity: 5,000
2024–25 Bangladesh Championship League is located in Bangladesh

== Team changes ==
Ten teams participated in the league: four from the previous season, four given direct entry from the abandoned 2023–24 Dhaka Senior Division League, and Dhaka Rangers FC, who entered after fulfilling professional league licensing criteria. Farashganj SC and Uttara FC were allowed entry after their relegation was reversed, but Uttara withdrew due to ownership issues. Victoria SC from the Second Division initially expressed interest but failed to obtain a professional league license. Additionally, Somaj Kallyan KS Mugda, also permitted direct entry from the abandoned Senior Division League, chose not to participate due to ownership complications. On 26 February 2025, NoFeL SC announced their withdrawal after failing to complete player registration on the final day of the extended transfer window.

=== To BCL ===
Relegated from the BPL

- None

Direct entry

- Arambagh KS
- City Club
- Dhaka Rangers FC
- Little Friends Club
- Uttar Baridhara Club

=== From BCL ===
Promoted to the BPL

- Fakirerpool Young Men's Club
- Dhaka Wanderers Club

Relegated to Dhaka Senior Division Football League

- ~~Farashganj SC~~
- Uttara FC

Withdrawal

- NoFeL SC

== Team locations ==
Team	Location	Appearance
Arambagh KS	(Arambagh), Dhaka	3rd
BFF Elite Academy	(Motijheel), Dhaka	4th
BRTC SC	Dhaka	1st
City Club	(Mirpur), Dhaka	1st
Dhaka Rangers	Dhaka	1st
Little Friends Club	(Gopibagh), Dhaka	1st
Farashganj SC	(Farashganj), Dhaka	7th
PWD Sports Club	(Segunbagicha), Dhaka	2nd
Uttar Baridhara	(Baridhara), Dhaka	6th
Wari Club Dhaka	(Motijheel), Dhaka	10th

=== Personnel and sponsoring ===
Team	Head coach	Captain	Kit manufacturer	Shirt sponsor (chest)
Arambagh KS	(Bangladesh) Akbor Hossain Ridon	(Bangladesh) Nikson Chakma		
BRTC Sports Club	(Bangladesh) Md Anowar Hosan	(Bangladesh) Rifat Hossain		
BFF Elite Academy	(Bangladesh) Golam Rabbani Choton	(Bangladesh) Mamun Miah Sojib		
City Club	(Bangladesh) Md Mahabub Ali Manik	(Bangladesh) Apu Ahmed		
Dhaka Rangers FC	(Bangladesh) Md Shofikul Hasan Polash	(Bangladesh) Anik Mree		
Farashganj SC	(Bangladesh) Azmol Hossain Biddyut	(Bangladesh) Md Raja Sheikh		
Little Friends Club	(Bangladesh) Rikon Chakma	(Bangladesh) Md Amir Ali		
PWD Sports Club	(Bangladesh) Md Anwar Hossain	(Bangladesh) Md Abdul Halim		
Uttar Baridhara Club	(Bangladesh) Md Jashim Mehedi	(Bangladesh) Sujon Biswas		
Wari Club Dhaka	(Bangladesh) Asharful Haque Apple	(Bangladesh) Sohag Bormon		

=== Coaching changes ===
Team	Outgoing head coach	Manner of departure	Date of vacancy	Position in the table	Incoming head coach	Date of appointment
Uttar Baridhara Club	(Bangladesh) Md Harun Or Rashid	Made Team Manager	15 April 2025	7th	(Bangladesh) Md Jashim Mehedi	March 2025
BRTC Sports Club	(Bangladesh) Md Murad Ahamed Milon	Unknown	15 April 2025	8th	(Bangladesh) Md Anowar Hosan	March 2025

== League table ==
Pos	Team	Pld	W	D	L	GF	GA	GD	Pts	BPL
1	PWD SC (C, P)	18	12	4	2	31	7	+24	40	Qualification to 2025–26 Bangladesh Premier League
2	Arambagh KS (P)	18	10	6	2	23	11	+12	36	Qualification to 2025–26 Bangladesh Premier League
3	City Club	18	8	7	3	28	14	+14	31	
4	Dhaka Rangers	18	6	5	7	22	28	−6	23	
5	Little Friends Club	18	5	6	7	18	20	−2	21	
6	Wari Club	18	5	6	7	16	24	−8	21	
7	BRTC SC	18	3	10	5	15	25	−10	19	
8	Farashganj SC (R)	18	4	5	9	14	21	−7	17	Relegation to 2025–26 Dhaka Senior Division League
9	Uttar Baridhara (R)	18	3	7	8	18	24	−6	16	Relegation to 2025–26 Dhaka Senior Division League
10	BFF Football Academy (Note: BFF Elite Academy is not eligible for promotion or relegation from the Bangladesh Championship League.)	18	3	6	9	16	27	−11	15	

Source: Global Sports Archive
Rules for classification: 1) Points; 2) Goal difference; 3) Goals scored;
(C) Champions; (P) Promoted; (R) Relegated

== Results ==
=== Result table ===
No Home \ No Away	AKS	BEA	BRTC	CC	DRFC	FSC	LFC	PWD	UBC	WC
Arambagh KS	—	2–0	3–1	0–0	1–0	0–2	0–0	0–2	2–1	1–0
BFF Football Academy	0–2	—	2–2	0–0	0–2	0–2	1–2	1–0	1–1	2–1
BRTC SC	4–4	0–0	—	0–1	1–1	0–0	0–6	0–2	0–0	0–0
City Club	0–0	1–1	2–0	—	1–2	4–1	1–1	1–2	5–1	3–1
Dhaka Rangers	0–1	4–2	1–1	2–3	—	2–1	2–1	0–5	1–0	1–2
Farashganj SC	1–3	1–2	0–1	1–3	0–0	—	0–0	0–1	3–2	0–0
Little Friends Club	0–1	1–0	0–1	1–1	2–0	1–0	—	0–3	0–1	0–0
PWD SC	0–0	2–1	0–0	0–0	3–0	1–0	6–1	—	1–0	1–2
Uttar Baridhara	0–0	3–2	1–2	0–2	2–2	1–1	1–1	0–0	—	4–0
Wari Club	0–3	1–1	2–2	1–0	2–2	0–1	2–1	1–2	1–0	—

Source: Global Sports Archive
Legend: Blue = left column team win; Yellow = draw; Red = top row team win.

=== Positions by round ===
The following table lists the positions of teams after each week of matches. In order to preserve the chronological evolution, any postponed matches are not included to the round at which they were originally scheduled but added to the full round they were played immediately afterward.

Team ╲ Round	1	2	3	4	5	6	7	8	9	10	11	12	13	14	15	16	17	18
Arambagh KS	2	2	2	1	1	1	1	1	2	2	2	2	2	2	2	2	2	2
BFF Elite Academy	1	1	1	2	3	3	5	5	5	6	6	8	8	8	7	10	10	10
BRTC	7	6	10	8	8	6	6	7	8	8	9	9	9	9	8	6	7	7
City Club	3	3	6	5	4	4	3	3	3	3	3	3	3	3	3	3	3	3
Dhaka Rangers	8	7	4	7	5	5	4	4	4	4	4	4	4	5	4	4	4	4
Farashganj SC	5	5	8	6	7	8	7	8	10	10	8	7	7	7	6	7	8	8
Little Friends Club	6	10	3	4	6	7	8	6	6	5	5	5	5	4	5	5	5	5
PWD SC	9	9	5	3	2	2	2	2	1	1	1	1	1	1	1	1	1	1
Uttar Baridhara	10	8	9	10	10	10	9	10	7	7	7	6	6	6	9	8	9	9
Wari Club	4	4	7	9	9	9	10	9	9	9	10	10	10	10	10	9	6	6

Leader
Runners-up
Relegation to Senior Division League

Source: Global Sports Archive

=== Results by games ===
Team ╲ Round	1	2	3	4	5	6	7	8	9	10	11	12	13	14	15	16	17	18
Arambagh KS	W	W	W	W	W	W	L	W	D	W	D	D	W	W	L	D	D	D
BFF Elite Academy	W	W	W	L	D	D	L	L	L	L	D	L	L	D	D	L	L	D
BRTC	L	D	L	W	D	D	D	L	L	L	D	W	D	D	D	W	D	D
City Club	W	D	L	D	W	D	W	W	D	W	L	W	D	W	D	L	W	D
Dhaka Rangers	L	D	W	L	W	D	W	D	W	L	D	L	L	L	W	W	L	D
Farashganj SC	D	D	L	L	L	L	D	L	W	L	W	W	D	L	W	L	L	D
Little Friends	D	L	W	D	L	L	L	W	D	W	D	L	D	W	L	D	W	L
PWD SC	L	D	W	W	W	W	W	W	W	W	W	L	W	W	W	D	D	D
Uttar Baridhara	L	D	L	L	L	D	W	L	W	W	L	D	D	L	L	D	D	D
Wari Club	W	L	L	W	L	D	L	D	D	L	D	W	D	L	D	W	W	W

Source: Global Sports Archive
W = Win; D = Draw; L = Lose

== Season statistics ==
There have been 201 goals scored in 90 matches, for an average of 2.23 goals per match.

Rank	Player	Club	Goals
1	Faisal Ahmed Shitol	Uttar Baridhara	8
1	Md Minhazul Karim Shadhin	PWD SC	8
3	Md Al Amin Rahman	Dhaka Rangers	6
3	Ariyan Shikder	Dhaka Rangers	6
3	Abu Sayed	PWD SC	6
6	Sohag Borman	Wari Club	5
6	Md Mijanur Rahman	City Club	5
6	Md Masum Mia	City Club	5
6	Md Sujon Biswas	Uttar Baridhara	5
6	Sahed Miah	City Club	5
11	Md Toriqul Islam Julfiqar	Farashganj SC	4
11	Md Rumon Hossain	PWD SC	4
11	Sabbir Ahmed Opurbo	Wari Club	4
11	Md Amir Ali	Little Friends Club	4
11	Md Rana	City Club	4
11	Didarul Islam Sonik	Arambagh KS	4
17	Nikson Chakma	Arambagh KS	3
17	Md Nazim Uddin	Arambagh KS	3
17	Md Al Mirad	Little Friends Club	3
17	Md Roton	Dhaka Rangers	3
17	Tahsan Khan	BFF Elite Academy	3
17	Md Golam Rabby	BRTC SC	3
23	Salah Uddin Sahed	BFF Elite Academy	2
23	Md Shafikul Islam	Arambagh KS	2
23	Md Maruf Ahamed	Uttar Baridhara	2
23	Md Joy Ahamed	BFF Elite Academy	2
23	Md Rayhan	Dhaka Rangers	2
23	Arbit Ray	Little Friends Club	2
23	Tasrif Ullah Nishad	BFF Elite Academy	2
23	Ashikur Rahman	PWD SC	2
23	Md Sharif	PWD SC	2
23	Md Abdul Halim	PWD SC	2
23	Jakir Hossain Ziku	Arambagh KS	2
23	Md Mobinur Rashid	City Club	2
23	Shahriar Ahmed Shuvo	Wari Club	2
23	Md Tanin Sarker	PWD SC	2
23	Saifullah Sardar	Farashganj SC	2
23	Aksh Ali	PWD SC	2
23	Md Sabbir Hossain	BRTC SC	2
23	Md Habibullah Bashar	City Club	2
23	Md Nahid Hasan	Little Friends Club	2
23	Rifat Hossain	BRTC SC	2
23	Md Asif Mahmud	Little Friends Club	2
23	Md Atikor Rahman	BRTC SC	2
46	Md Ashik	BFF Elite Academy	1
46	Md Akash Shaikh	City Club	1
46	Md Hafizur Rahman	BFF Elite Academy	1
46	Rubayet Hossain	BRTC SC	1
46	Al Mahfuz Islam	BFF Elite Academy	1
46	Md Imon Ali Sheikh	City Club	1
46	Md Shofiq Rahman	Little Friends Club	1
46	Md Delwar	Farashganj SC	1
46	Ariful Islam Biswas	Arambagh KS	1
46	Md Ashraful Huq	BRTC SC	1
46	Al Amin	BRTC SC	1
46	Md Akikul Islam	PWD SC	1
46	Md Ranju Sikder	City Club	1
46	Md Monir Hossain	BRTC SC	1
46	Sanjid Zaman Peash	BRTC SC	1
46	Tamjid Ahmed	Wari Club	1
46	Arif Khan Joy	Uttar Baridhara	1
46	Suaibur Rahman Mijan	Dhaka Rangers	1
46	Nayon Mia	Dhaka Rangers	1
46	Abu Sadek	Farashganj SC	1
46	Md Afjal Hussain	Arambagh KS	1
46	Md Jamir Uddin	Arambagh KS	1
46	Md Rajib	PWD SC	1
46	Md Owskurun Ahmed Rohan	City Club	1
46	Md Juel Rana	Wari Club	1
46	Md Shopon Hossain	BFF Elite Academy	1
46	Md Imon	BRTC SC	1
46	Md Ariful Islam Sakhawat	Arambagh KS	1
46	Md Sujon Mia	Farashganj SC	1
46	Md Rubel	Dhaka Rangers	1
46	Shawon Ritchil	Uttar Baridhara	1
46	Abdullah Junaid Cishty	BFF Elite Academy	1
46	Abdul Kader Jihad	Farashganj SC	1
46	Arman Hossain	Uttar Baridhara	1
46	Mahim Miah Sojib	BFF Elite Academy	1
46	Md Rafiqul Islam Sumon	Farashganj SC	1
46	Asadul Bhuiyan	Wari Club	1
46	Md Afroz Ali	City Club	1
46	Khandaker Khaild Hassan	Dhaka Rangers	1
46	Md Mehedi Hasan	Farashganj SC	1
46	Md Al Amin	Farashganj SC	1
46	Md Arafat Mia	Arambagh KS	1
46	Hira Gosh	PWD SC	1
46	Md Tanveer Hossain	Arambagh KS	1
46	Md Rakib	Little Friends Club	1
46	Shojib Rajbongshi	Little Friends Club	1
46	Md Marajul Islam	Dhaka Rangers	1
46	Saiful Islam	Wari Club	1
46	Sree Uttam Chandra	Farashganj SC	1
46	Md Shariar Bappy	Arambagh KS	1
46	Md Nazmul Ahmed Shakil	Arambagh KS	1
46	Md Saiful Islam	BFF Elite Academy	1
Own Goals			4
Total			201

=== Own goals ===
† Bold Club indicates winner of the match.

Player	Club	Opponent	Result	Date	Source
(Bangladesh) Md Imon	BRTC SC	Little Friends Club	0–6	17 March 2025	
(Bangladesh) Riyaz Choiyal	BFF Elite Academy	Wari Club	1–1	27 April 2025	
(Bangladesh) Sumon Kumar Das	PWD SC	Wari Club	1–2	30 April 2025	
(Bangladesh) Joy Chakraborty	BRTC SC	Arambagh KS	4–4	19 May 2025	

=== Hat-tricks ===
Player	For	Against	Result	Date	Ref
(Bangladesh) Md Masum Mia	City Club	Uttar Baridhara	5–1	23 March 2025	
(Bangladesh) Sahed Miah	City Club	Dhaka Rangers	3–2	1 May 2025	

== See also ==
- 2024–25 Bangladesh Premier League (football)
