= Tareq Miah =

Bangladeshi footballer

Personal information
- Full name: Md Tareq Miah
- Date of birth: 22 February 2002 (age 24)
- Place of birth: Sylhet, Bangladesh
- Height: 1.78 m (5 ft 10 in)
- Positions: Center-back; right-back

Senior career*
Years	Team	Apps	(Gls)
2017–2018	Siddique Bazar DJSC		
2018–2019	Somaj Kallyan KSM		
2019–2020	Dhaka Wanderers		
2020–2021	Bashundhara Kings	0	(0)
2021–2022	Muktijoddha Sangsad	20	(0)
2022–2024	Sheikh Jamal DC	10	(0)
- * Club domestic league appearances and goals as of 17 February 2024

Tareq Miah (Bengali: তারেক মিয়া; born 22 February 2002) is a Bangladeshi professional footballer who plays as a center-back. He last played for Bangladesh Premier League club Sheikh Jamal Dhanmondi Club.

== Early life ==
Tareq Miah was born on 22 February 2002, in South Surma, Sylhet. He began playing football at district level and eventually joined South Surma Football Academy in Sylhet, where he was trained by Akkas Uddin Akkai.

== Honours ==
Somaj Kallayan KS Mugda

- Dhaka Second Division League: 2018–19
