= 2025–26 Bangladesh Championship League =

14th season of the Bangladesh Championship League

Bangladesh Championship League
- Season: 2025–26
- Dates: 25 January – 6 May 2026
- Champions: Chattogram City (1st title)
- Promoted: Chattogram City; City Club; Dhaka Wanderers
- Relegated: Chittagong Abahani; Little Friends Club
- Matches: 90
- Goals: 234 (2.6 per match)
- Top goalscorer: Md Golam Rabby; BRTC Sports Club; Md Sahed Mia; City Club (10 goals each)
- Highest scoring: BRTC Sports Club 5–2 Suktara Jubo Sangsad (29 April 2026); Chattogram City 6–0 Little Friends Club (16 February 2026); Wari Club 5–1 Suktara Jubo Sangsad (15 April 2026); City Club 6–0 Chittagong Abahani (30 April 2026)
- Longest winning run: Chattogram City (4 matches)
- Longest unbeaten run: Chattogram City (12 matches)
- Longest winless run: Chittagong Abahani (6 matches)
- Longest losing run: Chittagong Abahani (6 matches)

The 2025–26 Bangladesh Championship League was the 14th season of the Bangladesh Championship League, Bangladesh's second-tier professional football league. The top two clubs secured promotion to the 2026–27 Bangladesh Football League season. The league began on 25 January 2026 and concluded on 6 May 2026.

== Venues ==
The matches were played at these three venues across the country.

Dhaka	Dhaka	Gazipur
Bashundhara Kings Arena Practice Ground	Fortis Ground	Shaheed Barkat Stadium
Capacity: 1,000	Capacity: 1,000	Capacity: 5,000
2025–26 Bangladesh Championship League is located in Bangladesh

== Team changes ==
Promoted from 2024–25 BCL	Relegated from 2024–25 BPL	Direct entry to 2025–26 BCL	Relegated to 2025–26 Senior Division
Arambagh KS; PWD SC	Dhaka Wanderers; Chittagong Abahani	Chattogram City; Khelaghar SKS; Suktara JS	Farashganj; Uttar Baridhara

== Team locations ==
Team	Location	2025–26 Season
BRTC SC	Dhaka	2nd
City Club	(Mirpur), Dhaka	3rd
Chattogram City	Chattogram	1st
Chattogram Abahani	Chattogram	2nd
Dhaka Rangers	Uttara, Dhaka	2nd
Dhaka Wanderers	(Motijheel), Dhaka	5th
Khelaghar SKS	Dhaka	1st
Little Friends	(Gopibagh), Dhaka	2nd
Suktara JS	Narayanganj	1st
Wari Club	(Motijheel), Dhaka	11th

== Personnel and sponsoring ==
Team	Head coach	Captain	Kit Manufacturer	Kit Sponsor
BRTC SC	(Bangladesh) Md Nejamat Ali	(Bangladesh) Md Golam Rabby		
Chattogram City	(Bangladesh) Md Shahidul Islam	(Bangladesh) Md Rasel Hossain	NU Sports	
Chattogram Abahani	(Bangladesh) Rakib Uddin	(Bangladesh) Md Ershad		
City Club	(Bangladesh) Md Mahabubul Haque Jewel	(Bangladesh) Sahed Miah		
Dhaka Rangers	(Bangladesh) Md Mahbub Ali Manik	(Bangladesh) Monaem Khan Raju		
Dhaka Wanderers	(France) Laurent Anies	(Bangladesh) Mohammad Emon		Swift Solution
Khelaghar SKS	(Bangladesh) Md Murad Ahmed Milon	(Bangladesh) Fazlay Rabbi		Nubia
Little Friends	(Bangladesh) Jashim Mehedi	(Bangladesh) Sakim Mia		Badhon Fashion
Suktara JS	(Bangladesh) Mohammad Mamun	(Bangladesh) Md Arif Howlader		
Wari Club	(Bangladesh) Md Asharful Haque Apple	(Bangladesh) Md Sakib Chowdhury		

== League table ==
Pos	Team	Pld	W	D	L	GF	GA	GD	Pts	BPL
1	Chattogram City	18	13	3	2	32	11	+21	42	Qualification to 2026–27 BFL
2	City Club	18	10	6	2	32	7	+25	36	Qualification to 2026–27 BFL
3	Dhaka Wanderers	18	8	5	5	25	18	+7	29	Qualification to 2026–27 BFL
4	BRTC SC	18	7	6	5	21	14	+7	27	
5	Suktara JS	18	7	4	7	29	30	−1	25	
6	Khelaghor SKS	18	6	6	6	21	18	+3	24	
7	Dhaka Rangers (Note: Dhaka Rangers fielded an overage player in the category requiring each team to include one U-18 player in their starting XI during their 2–0 victory against Chattogram City on 9 April 2026. As a result, the Bangladesh Football Federation (BFF) imposed a Taka 30,000 fine and awarded a 3–0 win to their opponents.)	18	6	5	7	23	24	−1	23	
8	Wari Club	18	5	6	7	25	22	+3	21	
9	Little Friends	18	3	3	12	16	43	−27	12	Relegation to 2026–27 DSDL
10	Chattogram Abahani	18	2	2	14	10	47	−37	8	Relegation to 2026–27 DSDL

Source: Sofascore
Rules for classification: 1 Points; (2) Goal difference; (3) Goals scored;

== Results ==
No Home \ No Away	BRTC	CC	CCFC	CAL	DRFC	DWC	KSKS	LFC	NSJS	WC
BRTC SC	—	0–1	1–1	4–0	1–1	0–0	1–0	1–0	5–2	4–1
City Club	0–1	—	2–0	4–0	2–0	1–1	0–0	1–1	1–0	1–1
Chattogram City	2–0	1–0	—	5–1	1–1	3–1	1–0	1–0	1–0	1–0
Chattogram Abahani	0–1	0–6	1–2	—	0–1	1–1	1–3	0–1	2–1	0–3
Dhaka Rangers	0–0	0–2	0–3	0–1	—	1–2	3–0	3–0	1–0	1–0
Dhaka Wanderers	1–0	1–2	1–0	2–0	3–1	—	0–0	2–0	1–2	1–3
Khelaghar SKS	2–0	0–2	1–4	2–0	2–2	0–0	—	3–1	0–2	0–0
Little Friends	2–2	0–6	0–1	4–1	1–4	0–5	1–5	—	2–2	2–1
Suktara JS	1–0	0–0	1–1	6–1	4–4	2–1	0–3	2–1	—	3–1
Wari Club	0–0	1–1	1–4	1–1	2–0	1–2	0–0	4–0	5–1	—

Source: Sofascore
Legend: Blue = left column team win; Yellow = draw; Red = top row team win.

== Positions by round ==
The following table lists the positions of teams after each week of matches. In order to preserve the chronological evolution, any postponed matches are not included to the round at which they were originally scheduled but added to the full round they were played immediately afterward.

Team ╲ Round	1	2	3	4	5	6	7	8	9	10	11	12	13	14	15	16	17	18
BRTC SC	5	7	6	4	5	6	7	7	7	7	7	7	6	7	5	4	3	4
Chattogram Abahani	4	6	8	9	8	8	8	9	8	9	10	10	10	10	10	10	10	10
Chattogram City	3	4	2	1	2	1	1	1	1	1	1	1	1	1	1	1	1	1
City Club	1	1	3	3	1	3	2	2	2	2	2	2	2	2	2	2	2	2
Dhaka Rangers	10	9	4	6	4	4	3	3	4	3	3	4	5	5	7	6	6	7
Dhaka Wanderers	2	3	1	2	3	5	6	6	3	4	4	3	3	3	3	5	4	3
Khelaghar SKS	8	5	7	5	6	3	4	4	5	5	6	6	4	4	4	3	5	6
Little Friends	6	2	5	7	9	9	9	8	9	10	8	8	9	9	9	9	9	9
Suktara JS	9	10	10	8	7	7	5	5	6	6	5	5	7	6	6	7	7	5
Wari Club	7	8	9	10	10	10	10	10	10	8	9	9	8	8	8	8	8	8

Leader
Runners-up & Third place
Relegation to Senior Division League

Source: Sofascore

== Results by games ==
Team ╲ Round	1	2	3	4	5	6	7	8	9	10	11	12	13	14	15	16	17	18
BRTC SC	D	D	D	W	D	L	L	L	D	W	L	W	W	L	W	W	W	D
Chattogram Abahani	W	L	L	L	D	L	L	L	W	L	L	D	L	L	L	L	L	L
Chattogram City	W	D	W	W	D	W	W	W	W	D	W	W	L	W	W	W	W	L
City Club	W	D	D	W	W	D	W	W	L	D	D	W	W	D	W	L	W	W
Dhaka Rangers	L	D	W	L	W	W	W	L	D	L	W	D	L	D	L	W	L	D
Dhaka Wanderers	W	D	W	L	D	D	L	W	W	L	W	D	W	D	L	L	W	W
Khelaghar SKS	L	W	L	W	D	W	W	L	D	D	L	D	W	D	L	W	L	D
Little Friends	D	W	L	L	L	L	L	W	L	L	W	L	L	D	D	L	L	L
Suktara JS	L	L	D	W	L	W	W	W	L	D	W	L	L	D	D	W	L	W
Wari Club	L	D	D	L	D	L	L	L	D	W	D	L	W	W	W	L	W	D

Source: Sofascore
W = Win; D = Draw; L = Lose

== Season statistics ==
=== Goalscorers ===
There have been 234 goals scored in 90 matches, for an average of 2.6 goals per match.

10 goals

- (Bangladesh) Md Golam Rabby (BRTC SC)
- (Bangladesh) Sahed Mia (City Club)

8 goals

- (Bangladesh) Afrose Ali (City Club)
- (Bangladesh) Md Amir Ali (Suktara JS)

7 goals

- (Bangladesh) Md Razib (Dhaka Wanderers)

6 goals

- (Bangladesh) Md Amiruzzaman Saymon (Chattogram City)
- (Bangladesh) Md Opu Rahman (City Club)

5 goals

- (Bangladesh) Didarul Islam Soinik (Chattogram City)
- (Bangladesh) Md Rimu Ahmed (Dhaka Rangers)
- (Bangladesh) Ajanta Chakma (Wari Club)
- (Bangladesh) Md Sohag Mia (Suktara JS)

4 goals

- (Bangladesh) Hemanta Vincent Biswas (Dhaka Wanderers)
- (Bangladesh) Md Shafiqul Islam (Chattogram City)
- (Bangladesh) Md Masrafi Islam Bhadon (Chattogram City)
- (Bangladesh) Md Rafiqul Islam Sumon (Chattogram City)
- (Bangladesh) Md Bappy Hossain (Little Friends)
- (Bangladesh) Md Rifat Kazi (Khelaghar SKS)
- (Bangladesh) Saief Shamsud (Khelaghar SKS)
- (Bangladesh) Mohammad Mubarak Hossain (Wari Club)
- (Bangladesh) Shahriar Ahammed Shuvo (Wari Club)
- (Bangladesh) Ariful Islam Biswas (Dhaka Rangers)
- (Bangladesh) Aswad Bin Walid Khan (Dhaka Rangers)
- (Bangladesh) Md Khairul Islam (BRTC SC)
- (Bangladesh) Rubiyeat Hossain (BRTC SC)
- (Bangladesh) Shovo Rajbongshi (Dhaka Wanderers)

3 goals

- (Bangladesh) Hira Ghosh (Dhaka Rangers)
- (Bangladesh) Md Shimul Hasan (Dhaka Rangers)
- (Bangladesh) Shaon Hasnad (Wari Club)
- (Bangladesh) Chinga U Marma (Wari Club)
- (Bangladesh) Md Jahirul Islam Joy (Wari Club)
- (Bangladesh) Md Tanin Sarker (Khelaghar SKS)

2 goals

- (Bangladesh) Md Mithu (City Club)
- (Bangladesh) Md Owskurun Ahmed Rohan (City Club)
- (Bangladesh) Md Rasel Hossain (Chattogram City)
- (Bangladesh) Razuan Kabir (Dhaka Wanderers)
- (Bangladesh) Md Saimun (Dhaka Rangers)
- (Bangladesh) Md Shipon Ali (Little Friends)
- (Bangladesh) Julkernine Sarder Rafi (Little Friends)
- (Bangladesh) Md Hossen Ali (Khelaghar SKS)
- (Bangladesh) Md Rabiul Awal (Khelaghar SKS)
- (Bangladesh) Md Mahfuzur Rahman Babu (Chattogram Abahani)
- (Bangladesh) Saifullah Sardar (Chittagong Abahani)
- (Bangladesh) Masud Rana (Little Friends)
- (Bangladesh) Md Atikul Islam (Little Friends)
- (Bangladesh) Md Labibur Rahman (Dhaka Rangers)
- (Bangladesh) Md Sohel Rana (Chittagong Abahani)
- (Bangladesh) Jamal Uddin (Chittagong Abahani)
- (Bangladesh) Md Asif (Suktara JS)
- (Bangladesh) Md Habib Miah (Suktara JS)

1 goal

- (Bangladesh) Md Fahim Morshed (City Club)
- (Bangladesh) Md Muntashir Rahman (City Club)
- (Bangladesh) Mohid Hossen (Little Friends)
- (Bangladesh) Md Alamgir (Little Friends)
- (Bangladesh) Md Azad Ali (Little Friends)
- (Bangladesh) Mohon Akondo (BRTC SC)
- (Bangladesh) Md Mostajeb Khan (BRTC SC)
- (Bangladesh) Jayanto Lal (BRTC SC)
- (Bangladesh) Md Raja Sheikh (Wari Club)
- (Bangladesh) Md Ahsanul Haque Tanim (Wari Club)
- (Bangladesh) Mehedi Hasan Polash (Dhaka Wanderers)
- (Bangladesh) Mehedi Hasan Reyead (Dhaka Wanderers)
- (Bangladesh) Imran Hossain (Dhaka Wanderers)
- (Bangladesh) Md Abdul Halim (Dhaka Wanderers)
- (Bangladesh) Md Rifat Hasan Sarthok (Dhaka Wanderers)
- (Bangladesh) Md Apon Sarkar (Dhaka Wanderers)
- (Bangladesh) Rahmat Ullah Jishan (Dhaka Wanderers)
- (Bangladesh) Tasrif Ullah Nishad (Chattogram City)
- (Bangladesh) Md Shofiqul Alom Bhadon (Chattogram City)
- (Bangladesh) Md Roman (Chattogram City)
- (Bangladesh) Prakash Das (Chattogram City)
- (Bangladesh) Naky Chandra Das (Khelaghar SKS)
- (Bangladesh) Akash Ahmed (Khelaghar SKS)
- (Bangladesh) Khandakar Khalid Hasan (Khelaghar SKS)
- (Bangladesh) Atikur Rahman (Khelaghar SKS)
- (Bangladesh) Md Sabbir Islam (Khelaghar SKS)
- (Bangladesh) Md Emon (Dhaka Rangers)
- (Bangladesh) MH Mohibullah (Dhaka Rangers)
- (Bangladesh) Md Rayhan (Dhaka Rangers)
- (Bangladesh) Md Nadim (Suktara JS)
- (Bangladesh) Al Amin (Suktara JS)
- (Bangladesh) Radowan Hasan (Suktara JS)
- (Bangladesh) Md Faysal Ahmed (Suktara JS)
- (Bangladesh) Al Amin (Suktara JS)
- (Bangladesh) Abdul Kadir Jihad (Suktara JS)
- (Bangladesh) Muhammad Tanvirul Islam (Suktara JS)
- (Bangladesh) Md Atikul Islam (Suktara JS)
- (Bangladesh) Md Sharif Islam (Chittagong Abahani)
- (Bangladesh) Md Monirul Islam (Chittagong Abahani)
- (Bangladesh) Md Mostakim Ali (Wari Club)
- (Bangladesh) Md Al Amin Kagozi (City Club)

Source: GSA

=== Own goals ===
† Bold Club indicates winner of the match.

Player	Club	Opponent	Result	Date	Source
(Bangladesh) Mohid Hossen	Little Friends Club	Khelaghar SKS	1–5	16 April 2026	
(Bangladesh) Md Asif	Suktara JS	Dhaka Wanderers	2–1	27 April 2026	

=== Hat-tricks ===
† Bold Club indicates winner of the match.

Player	For	Against	Result	Date	Ref
(Bangladesh) Saief Shamsud	Khelaghar SKS	Little Friends Club	5–1	16 April 2026	
(Bangladesh) Sahed Miah	City Club	Chittagong Abahani	6–0	30 April 2026	
(Bangladesh) Md Razib	Dhaka Wanderers	Little Friends Club	5–0	3 May 2026	
(Bangladesh) Md Amir Ali	Suktara JS	Chittagong Abahani	6–1	4 May 2026	

=== Cards statistics ===
- (red card) Red cards:

As of 6 May 2026

Rank	Club	Red cards/Sent off
1	City Club	3
1	Dhaka Wanderers	3
2	BRTC SC	2
2	Chittagong Abahani	2
2	Dhaka Rangers	2
2	Wari Club	2
3	Chattogram City	1
3	Khelaghar SKS	1
Total		16
