= Fazlay Rabbi =

Bangladeshi footballer

Personal information
- Full name: Mohammed Fazlay Rabbi
- Date of birth: 16 May 1996 (age 30)
- Place of birth: Comilla, Bangladesh
- Positions: Defensive midfielder; right-back

Team information
- Current team: Chittagong Abahani
- Number: 17

Senior career*
Years	Team	Apps	(Gls)
2010–2011	Kadamtola Sangsad		
2012–2013	Victoria SC		
2013–2019	Sheikh Russel KC		(3)
2019–2021	Sheikh Jamal DC	9	(0)
2021–2022	Rahmatganj MFS	16	(1)
2022–2023	Muktijoddha Sangsad	10	(0)
2023–2024	Brothers Union	2	(0)
2024–2025	Chittagong Abahani	18	(1)
2026–	Khelaghar SKKS	1	(0)

International career^{‡}
2015	Bangladesh U17		
2018	Bangladesh U23	1	(0)
2016–2018	Bangladesh	2	(0)
- * Club domestic league appearances and goals as of 27 January 2026 ‡ National team caps and goals as of 1 April 2021

Fazlay Rabbi (Bengali: ফজলে রাব্বি; born 16 May 1996) is a Bangladeshi professional footballer who plays as a midfielder for and captains Bangladesh Championship League club Khelaghar Samaj Kallyan Samity.

== International career ==
Fazlay Rabbi made his senior international debut on 24 March 2016, coming on as an 82nd-minute substitute for Atiqur Rahman Meshu in an 8-0 World Cup qualifying defeat to Jordan.

== Career statistics ==
=== International ===
As of matches played 29 August 2018.

National team	Year	Apps	Goals
Bangladesh	2016	1	0
Bangladesh	2018	1	0
Total		2	0
