= 2011–12 Bangladesh Championship League =

Premier Bank Championship League
- Season: 2012
- Champions: Coxcity SC

The 2011–12 Premier Bank Bangladesh Championship League started in March 2012 where 7 clubs competed with each other on double-league basis.

== Teams and locations ==
Locations of teams in the 2012 Bangladesh Championship League
- Agrani Bank SC, Dhaka
- Beanibazar SC, Sylhet
- Chittagong Abahani, Chittagong
- Coxcity SC, Cox's Bazar
- Uttar Baridhara SC, Dhaka
- Victoria SC, Dhaka
- Wari Club, Dhaka

The venues were-

- Bir Sherestha Shaheed Shipahi Mostafa Kamal Stadium, Dhaka
- Cox’s Bazar Stadium, Cox's Bazar
- MA Aziz Stadium, Chittagong
- Sylhet District Stadium, Sylhet

== Standings ==
Pos	Team	Pld	W	D	L	GF	GA	GD	Pts
1	Coxcity SC (C)	12	5	5	2	14	11	+3	20
2	Uttar Baridhara SC	12	3	8	1	15	9	+6	17
3	Wari Club	12	4	5	3	13	10	+3	17
4	Beanibazar SC	12	3	7	2	10	8	+2	16
5	Agrani Bank SC	12	4	4	4	11	15	−4	16
6	Victoria SC	12	3	4	5	10	13	−3	13
7	Chittagong Abahani	12	2	3	7	8	15	−7	9

Source: BFF
Rules for classification: 1) points; 2) goal difference; 3) number of goals scored.
(C) Champions
