= BFF Elite Football Academy =

Bangladeshi association football club

- Full name: Bangladesh Football Federation Elite Football Academy
- Short name: BEFA
- Founded: September 12, 2021; 5 years ago
- Ground: BSSS Mostafa Kamal Stadium
- Capacity: 25,000
- Operator: Bangladesh Football Federation
- Head Coach: Golam Rabbani Choton
- League: Bangladesh Championship League
- 2024–25: Bangladesh Championship League, 10th of 10
Home colours	Away colours

BFF Elite Football Academy is a Bangladeshi youth development football academy based in Dhaka, Bangladesh. Established in 2021, it is operated by the Bangladesh Football Federation, with the goal of developing and nurturing young Bangladeshi footballers. The academy team participates in Bangladesh Championship League, country's second-tier football league. However, they will not be subject to promotion or relegation regardless of their position in the points table of the league.

== History ==
The academy started with 51 under-15 footballers in September, 2021. The players were selected through nationwide trial. The current age level of the academy is under-18. The academy is situated at Bir Sherestha Shaheed Shipahi Mostafa Kamal Stadium of Dhaka, Bangladesh. BFF Elite Football Academy has officially started their journey 12 September 2021.

On 29 December 2021, Bangladesh Football Federation has announced the academy team will be part of upcoming Bangladesh Championship League to give the academy players regular playing time in competitive football and monitor their improvement and. They have started preparation for the league. Former assistant coach of Bangladesh U-19 and Bangladesh U-16, Rashed Ahmed Pappu, was appointed as the head coach of the academy for their league debut.

On 20 February 2022, the BFF Elite Academy team played their first ever professional game. They defeated previous years runners up NoFeL SC by 2–1 in the opening match of the 2021–22 Bangladesh Championship League. Both goals were scored by Mirajul Islam. On 12 April 2022, the BFF Elite Academy produced their first Bangladesh Premier League player, as the club's top scorer during the first leg of the Championship season, Mirajul Islam, joined Mohammedan SC on a loan deal worth Tk 10 lakh.

== Current squad ==
As of 22 May 2025

Note: Flags indicate national team as defined under FIFA eligibility rules; some limited exceptions apply. Players may hold more than one non-FIFA nationality.

No.	Pos.	Nation	Player
4	DF	BAN	Md Abdul Riyad Fahim
5	DF	BAN	Md Kholilur Rahman Anuar
7	FW	BAN	Md Habib
8	MF	BAN	Akash Ahamed (Captain)
9	FW	BAN	Mahum Mia Sojib
10	FW	BAN	Md Hedayet Ullah
12	MF	BAN	Md Rakib Hossen
13	GK	BAN	Ismail Hossain Rakib
14	MF	BAN	Md Shopon Hssain
15	MF	BAN	Sonjoy Tappo
16	MF	BAN	Md Hafizur Rahman
17	FW	BAN	Md Ashik
18	MF	BAN	Md Raj
20	FW	BAN	Tahsan Kha
21	FW	BAN	Tasrif Ullah Nishad
24	FW	BAN	Bappi Hossain

No.	Pos.	Nation	Player
25	FW	BAN	Md Rahul Amin Akash
26	DF	BAN	Md Asif
28	MF	BAN	Al Mahfuz Islam
29	DF	BAN	Md Atik Hasan
31	MF	BAN	Md Niaj Morshed
33	FW	BAN	Shanto Hasan
34	DF	BAN	Md Momin
35	MF	BAN	Abdullah Junaid Cishty
39	MF	BAN	Eftekhar Ahmed Sany
39	MF	BAN	Parvez Hossen
40	GK	BAN	Iftar Bin Md Farhad
41	FW	BAN	Tamim Hossain
42	DF	BAN	Fongliancap Bown
43	DF	BAN	Abu Rayhan Shawon
44	MF	BAN	Md Saiful Islam
46	GK	BAN	Chandro Saha

== Team records ==
=== Academy head coach records ===
As of 22 May 2025

Head Coach	From	To	P	W	D	L	GF	GA	%W
(Bangladesh) Rashed Ahmed Pappu	7 December 2021	1 October 2023	45	24	6	15	73	44	53.33
(England) Peter Butler	23 November 2023	30 May 2024	14	6	4	4	20	18	42.86
(Bangladesh) Saiful Bari Titu	28 March 2024	4 January 2025	0	0	0	0	0	0	—
(Bangladesh) Golam Rabbani Choton	5 January 2025	Present	9	3	2	4	10	13	33.33
(Bangladesh) Jahangir Alam Mintu (caretaker)	23 April 2025	22 May 2025	9	0	5	4	6	14	0.00

== Personnel ==
=== Current technical staff ===
As of 22 May 2025

Position	Name
Head coach	(Bangladesh) Golam Rabbani Choton
Team manager	(Bangladesh) Md Abul Hossain
Assistant coach	(Bangladesh) Jahangir Alam Mintu
Assistant coach	(Bangladesh) Wali Mamun
Assistant coach	(Bangladesh) Rabiul Hasan Mona
Team leader	(Bangladesh) Md Saeed Hasan
Goalkeeping coach	(Bangladesh) Md Emraan Hasan Enam
Media officer	(Bangladesh) Oyon Mollick
Physiotherapist	(Bangladesh) K.M. Shakib
Masseur	(Bangladesh) Md Nahid
Equipment officers	(Bangladesh) Md Mohsin
