= 2018–19 Dhaka Second Division Football League =

Dhaka Second Division Football League
- Season: 2018-19
- Dates: 24 March – 17 May 2019
- Champions: Somaj Kallyan KS Mugda
- Promoted: Somaj Kallyan KS Mugda; East End Club; Dilkusha SC
- Relegated: Shantinagar SC
- Matches: 154
- Goals: 385 (2.5 per match)

The 2018–19 Dhaka Second Division Football League was held in 2019 from 24 March to 17 May. Thirteen teams participated in the Second Division, which is the fourth-tier in the Bangladeshi football league system.

Somaj Kallyan KS Mugda were promoted to Senior Division League as champions, with East End Club and Dilkusha SC following as second and third place holders.

== Teams ==
There were thirteen teams that participated in the league.

- Somaj Kallyan KS Mugda
- Tongi Krira Chakra
- Purbachal Parishad
- AFC Uttara
- Little Friends Club
- City Club
- East End Club
- BG Press S&RC
- Shantinagar Club
- Dilkusha SC
- Bangladesh Krira Shikkha Protishthan
- Khilgaon Sporting Club
- Gouripur Sporting Club
