= 2014–15 Bangladesh Championship League =

Bangladesh Championship League
- Season: 2014–15
- Dates: 26 November 2015 – 28 January 2016
- Champions: Uttar Baridhara SC
- Relegated: Wari Club
- Promoted: Uttar Baridhara SC; Arambagh Krira Sangha

The 2014–15 Bangladesh Championship League (also known as Minister Fridge Bangladesh Championship League 2014–15 for sponsorship reasons) was the 4th season of the Bangladesh Championship League, Bangladesh's second-tier professional football league. The league began on 26 November 2015 and ended on 28 January 2016.

== Standings ==
Pos	Team	Pld	W	D	L	GF	GA	GD	Pts	Promotion or relegation
1	Uttar Baridhara SC (C, P)	14	7	6	1	18	9	+9	27	Promotion to 2016 BPL
2	Arambagh KS (P)	14	6	5	3	14	11	+3	23	Promotion to 2016 BPL
3	T&T Club Motijheel	14	5	6	3	13	8	+5	21	
4	Police AC	14	3	8	3	13	11	+2	17	
5	Agrani Bank SC	14	5	2	7	15	14	+1	17	
6	Victoria SC	14	3	6	5	12	15	−3	15	
7	Fakirerpool YMC	14	4	3	7	9	22	−13	15	
8	Wari Club (R)	14	3	4	7	11	15	−4	13	Relegation to 2017 Dhaka Senior Division League

Source: bff.com.bd GSA
(C) Champions; (P) Promoted; (R) Relegated
