= Khelaghar Samaj Kallyan Samity =

Bangladeshi institutional football club

- Full name: Khelaghar Samaj Kallyan Samity
- Short name: KSKS
- Founded: 1969; 57 years ago
- Owner: Khelaghar Social Welfare Association
- President: Mahmudur Rahman Barkat
- Head coach: Murad Ahmed Milon
- League: Bangladesh Championship League
- 2025–26: 6th of 10
Home colours	Away colours

Khelaghar Samaj Kallyan Samity (Bengali: খেলাঘর সমাজ কল্যাণ সমিতি) is a professional football club from Farmgate area of Dhaka, Bangladesh. It currently competes in the Bangladesh Championship League, the second-tier of Bangladeshi football.

== History ==
Khelaghar Social Welfare Association was founded as a patriotic youth cultural organization in Dhaka in 1952. The organization inaugurated its sports club in 1969. The football team initially competed in the then fifth-tier Pioneer Football League in 2004 before going into hiatus. The club returned to football after acquiring a professional league license, participating in the second tier from the 2025–26 Bangladesh Championship League. The club appointed Murad Ahmed Milon as head coach prior to the season. On 25 January 2026, they lost their inaugural professional league game against City Club by 2–0 at the Bashundhara Kings Arena.

== Current squad ==
As of 25 January 2026

Note: Flags indicate national team as defined under FIFA eligibility rules; some limited exceptions apply. Players may hold more than one non-FIFA nationality.

No.	Pos.	Nation	Player
1	GK	BAN	Md Borhan Uddin
2	DF	BAN	Md Sabbir Isalm
3	DF	BAN	Md Mamun Hossain
4	DF	BAN	Md Ramim Khan
5	DF	BAN	Md Azam Khan
6	MF	BAN	Md Tanin Sarker
7	MF	BAN	Khandaker Khalid Hassan
8	MF	BAN	Fazlay Rabbi (captain)
9	FW	BAN	Md Rabiul Awal
10	FW	BAN	Saief Shamsud
11	MF	BAN	Md Riaz Hossain
12	DF	BAN	Nd Noyon Hossain
14	DF	BAN	Sheikh Sangram
15	DF	BAN	Md Imon
16	FW	BAN	Md Sifat Khan
17	MF	BAN	Naky Chandra Das

No.	Pos.	Nation	Player
18	DF	BAN	Saiful Islam Saed
19	FW	BAN	Md Hossen Ali
20	FW	BAN	Md Rifat Kazi
21	MF	BAN	Md Akash Ahmed
22	GK	BAN	Md Hasan Mainur Muin
23	DF	BAN	Md Naasrullah Sheikh
24	MF	BAN	Sohel Hassan Rana
25	MF	BAN	Md Rasel
27	DF	BAN	Atiqur Rahman
29	MF	BAN	Md Isa Howladar
30	GK	BAN	Md Kamal Hossain
31	GK	BAN	Md Oyon Hossain
45	MF	BAN	Md Fardin Ahmed
77	DF	BAN	Milon Kumar Das
99	DF	BAN	Md Rakib Rahman

== Personnel ==
=== Coaching staff ===
As of 26 January 2026

Position	Name
Head coach	(Bangladesh) Murad Hossain Milon
Assistant Coach	(Bangladesh) Omair Kaab Md Omar
Team manager	(Bangladesh) Omar Taher Babu
Assistant manager	(Bangladesh) Kamrul Islam Bhuyan Dipu
Goalkeeping coach	(Bangladesh) Kazi Rajoyan Hossain
Trainer	(Bangladesh) Md Jalal Uddin
Media officer	(Bangladesh) Mokbul Ur Rahman
Doctor	(Bangladesh) Md Mehedi Hasan
Masseur	(Bangladesh) Md Eqram

=== Board of directors ===
As of 26 January 2026

Position	Name
President	(Bangladesh) Mahmudur Rahman Barkat
Technical director	(Bangladesh) Md Ferdous Faroque

== Head coach's record ==
As of 4 May 2026

Head coach	From	To	P	W	D	L	GF	GA	%W
(Bangladesh) Md Murad Ahmed Milon	5 November 2025	Present	18	6	6	6	21	18	33.33

== See also ==
- Khelaghar Samaj Kallyan Samity cricket team
