= 2014 Bangladesh Championship League =

Premier Bank Championship League
- Season: 2014
- Champions: Rahmatganj
- Promoted: Rahmatganj & Farashganj
- Relegated: Badda Jagoroni

The 2014 Premier Bank Bangladesh Championship League started on 26 February 2014 where 7 clubs competed with each other.

== Teams and locations ==
Location of teams in the 2014 Bangladesh Championship League

The following 7 clubs competed in the Bangladesh Championship League during the 2014 season.

- Agrani Bank SC, Dhaka
- Arambagh Krira Sangha, Dhaka
- Badda Jagoroni Sangsad, Dhaka
- Farashganj SC, Dhaka
- Rahmatganj MFS, Dhaka
- Victoria SC, Dhaka
- Wari Club, Dhaka

The venues for this season were-

- Bangabandhu National Stadium, Dhaka
- Bir Sherestha Shaheed Shipahi Mostafa Kamal Stadium, Dhaka

== Standings ==
| Pos | Team | Pld | W | D | L | GF | GA | GD | Pts | Promotion or relegation |
|---|---|---|---|---|---|---|---|---|---|---|
| 1 | Rahmatganj MFS (C, P) | 18 | 13 | 5 | 0 | 36 | 8 | +28 | 44 | 2014–15 Bangladesh Premier League |
| 2 | Farashganj SC (P) | 18 | 9 | 8 | 1 | 26 | 17 | +9 | 35 | 2014–15 Bangladesh Premier League |
| 3 | Agrani Bank SC | 18 | 6 | 8 | 4 | 20 | 13 | +7 | 26 | |
| 4 | Wari Club | 18 | 6 | 4 | 8 | 25 | 23 | +2 | 22 | |
| 5 | Arambagh Krira Sangha | 18 | 5 | 6 | 7 | 21 | 25 | −4 | 21 | |
| 6 | Victoria SC | 18 | 5 | 3 | 10 | 19 | 28 | −9 | 18 | |
| 7 | Badda Jagoroni (R) | 18 | 0 | 4 | 14 | 9 | 42 | −33 | 4 | Relegation to 2017 Dhaka Senior Division League |

Source: BFF
Rules for classification: 1) points; 2) goal difference; 3) number of goals scored.
(C) Champions; (P) Promoted; (R) Relegated
