= Bangladesh Championship League =

Association football league in Bangladesh

- Organising bodies: Bangladesh Football Federation (BFF)
- Founded: 2012; 14 years ago
- First season: 2012
- Country: Bangladesh
- Confederation: AFC
- Number of clubs: 10
- Level on pyramid: 2
- Promotion to: Bangladesh Football League
- Relegation to: Senior Division Football League
- Domestic cup(s): Federation Cup; Independence Cup
- Current champions: Chattogram City (1st title) (2025–26)
- Most championships: Fakirerpool Young Men's Club (2 titles)
- Website: bff.com.bd
- Current: 2026–27 Bangladesh Championship League

Bangladesh Championship League (Bengali: বাংলাদেশ চ্যাম্পিয়নশিপ লিগ), simply known as the BCL and officially ABG Bashundhara Bangladesh Championship League since 2023 for sponsorship reasons, is the second-tier professional football league of Bangladesh run by the Bangladesh Football Federation. It was founded in 2012.

== History ==
Bangladesh Football Federation (BFF) introduced the country's first professional football league in 2007. The 2nd tier professional league began with the 2012 season of Premier League. BFF introduced the second-tier league in 2012 as season 5 of Premier League was commencing.

== Structure ==
As of February 2025.

Level	Division	Class
1	Bangladesh Football League; 10 clubs (substituted off) teams relegated	Professional
2	Bangladesh Championship League; 10 clubs (substituted on) 2 teams promoted (substituted off) 2 teams relegated	Professional
3	Dhaka Senior Division League; 18 clubs (substituted on) 4 teams promoted (substituted off) 2 teams relegated	Semi-professional
4	Dhaka Second Division League; 15 clubs (substituted on) 2 teams promoted (substituted off) 2 teams relegated	Semi-professional
5	Dhaka Third Division League; 15 clubs (substituted on) 2 teams promoted (substituted off) 2 teams relegated	Semi-professional
6	Bangladesh Pioneer League; Unlimited number of clubs (substituted on) 4 teams promoted No relegation	Amateur

== List of winners ==
Champions so far are:

Season	Club	P	W	D	L	GF	GA	GD	Pts
2012	Cox City Sporting Club	12	5	5	2	14	11	3	20
2013	Chittagong Abahani	14	9	3	2	28	11	17	30
2014	Rahmatganj MFS	18	13	5	0	36	8	28	44
2014–15	Uttar Baridhara	14	7	6	1	18	9	9	27
2015–16	Fakirerpool YMC	14	7	6	1	15	8	7	27
2017	Bashundhara Kings	18	10	5	3	23	17	6	35
2019	Bangladesh Police	20	11	6	3	31	13	18	39
2020	Competition cancelled due to COVID-19 pandemic in Bangladesh								
2021	Swadhinata KS	22	13	6	3	30	11	19	45
2022	Fortis FC	22	13	8	1	29	9	20	47
2022–23	Brothers Union	20	16	3	1	30	6	24	51
2024	Fakirerpool YMC	14	8	3	3	28	14	14	27
2025	PWD SC	18	12	4	2	31	7	24	40
2026	Chattogram City	18	13	3	2	32	11	+21	42

== Performances by club ==
As of the end of 2025–26 season.

Club	Winners	Runners-up	Years Won	Years Runners-up
CoxCity Sporting Club	1		2012	
Chittagong Abahani	1		2013	
Uttar Baridhara	1	3	2014–15	2012, 2013, 2019
Rahmatganj MFS	1		2014	
Farashganj SC		1		2014
Saif SC		1		2015–16
Bashundhara Kings	1		2017	
NoFeL SC		1		2017
Bangladesh Police	1		2019	
Arambagh KS		2		2014–15, 2025
Swadhinata KS	1		2021	
Fortis FC	1		2022	
AFC Uttara		1		2022
Brothers Union	1		2022–23	
BFF Elite Academy		1		2022–23
Fakirerpool YMC	2		2015–16, 2024	
Dhaka Wanderers	1		2024	
PWD SC	1		2025	
Chattogram City	1		2026	
City Club		1		2026

== Stats and players ==
=== Top Goalscorer ===
Year	Player	Club	Goals
2012	(Bangladesh) Toufiq Hasan Gofur	Agrani Bank SC	12
2013	(Bangladesh) Nabib Newaj Jibon	Uttar Baridhara	12
2014	(Bangladesh) Nurul Absar	Rahmatganj	11
2014–15	(Bangladesh) Mohammed Palash	Arambagh KS	7
2015–16	(Bangladesh) Arifur Rahman	Victoria SC	6
2017	(Bangladesh) Ariful Islam	NoFeL SC	12
2019	(Bangladesh) Amirul Islam	Bangladesh Police	17
2020	League cancelled		
2021	(Bangladesh) Ali Akbar Kanon	Wari Club	13
2022	(Bangladesh) Moinul Islam	Uttara FC	18
2022–23	(Bangladesh) Mirajul Islam	BFF Elite Academy	19
2024	(Bangladesh) Rafayel Tudu	Fakirerpool YMC	12
2025	(Bangladesh) Minhazul Karim Shadin	PWD SC	8
2025	(Bangladesh) Faisal Ahmed Shitol	Uttar Baridhara	8
2026	(Bangladesh) Md Golam Rabby	BRTC SC	10
2026	(Bangladesh) Sahed Mia	City Club	10

== Clubs ==
=== 2025–26 season ===
Ten clubs are competing in the 2025–26 season — eight from the previous season and two new entrants (two relegated from the Premier League).

Locations of the 2025–26 Bangladesh Championship League teams

Team	Location	2025–26 Season
BRTC SC	Dhaka	2nd
City Club	(Mirpur), Dhaka	3rd
Chattogram City	Chattogram	1st
Chattogram Abahani	Chattogram	2nd
Dhaka Rangers	Uttara, Dhaka	2nd
Dhaka Wanderers	(Motijheel), Dhaka	5th
Khelaghar SKS	Dhaka	1st
Little Friends	(Gopibagh), Dhaka	2nd
Suktara JS	Narayanganj	1st
Wari Club	(Motijheel), Dhaka	11th

== Sponsorship ==
Here is the list of sponsors of BCL since its inception:

Period	Sponsors	Type of Institute	Notes	References
2012-2014	Premier Bank Limited	Bank	At first season, Premier Bank Limited sponsored the title, Destiny Group was the co-sponsor of first season.	
2014-2015	Minister Freeze	Electronics	Premier Bank was named as a presenting sponsor while Pragati Insurance, Eastern Bank, Novo Air and Treasure Securities named as co-sponsors of the league.	
2015-2017	RB-Marcel Group	Electronics	They sponsored seasons: 2015/16 and 2017.	
2018-2019	International Sports Partner	Distributor	TVS brand is the 'title sponsor' as well as of BPL.	

== See also ==
- Bangladesh Football League
- Federation Cup
- Sport in Bangladesh
- Football in Bangladesh
- Cricket in Bangladesh
