= Shanti Mardi =

Bangladeshi footballer

Personal information
- Full name: Shanti Mardi
- Date of birth: 23 October 2008 (age 18)
- Height: 1.60 m (5 ft 3 in)
- Position: Midfielder

Team information
- Current team: Rajshahi Stars

Youth career
- Boda Two Star FA

Senior career*
Years	Team	Apps	(Gls)
2023–2024	Dhaka Rangers		
2025	Nasrin	0	(0)
2025—2026	Bangladesh Army	9	(1)
2026–	Rajshahi Stars	0	(0)

International career^{‡}
2025—	Bangladesh U20	13	(5)
2025–	Bangladesh	0	(0)
Medal record
Women's football
Representing Bangladesh
SAFF U-20 Women's Championship
Runner-up	2026 Bangladesh
Winner	2025 Bangladesh
- * Club domestic league appearances and goals as of 19 August 2026 ‡ National team caps and goals as of 4 April 2026

Shanti Mardi (Bengali: শান্তি মার্ডি; Santali: ᱥᱟᱱᱛᱤ ᱢᱟᱨᱰᱤ) is a Bangladeshi professional footballer who plays as a midfielder. She plays for Bangladesh Women's League club Rajshahi Stars and the Bangladesh national team.

== Early career ==
Mardi began playing football in school competitions in 2017, while she was a primary school student. She later trained at Boda Two Star Football Academy in Boda, Panchagarh District, under its director, Mofazzal Hossain Bipul, who played a role in her development as a footballer.

== Club career ==
=== Dhaka Rangers ===
Shanti played for Dhaka Rangers in the 2023–24 Bangladesh Women's Football League.

=== Bangladesh Army ===
In the 2025–26 Bangladesh Women's Football League, she joined Bangladesh Army. She scored her first goal for the club against BKSP.

=== Rajshahi Stars ===
She joined Rajshahi Stars to play in the 2026–27 AFC Women's Champions League. She made her debut for the club against Rovers, winning 8–0.

== International career ==
In 2025, Shanti represented the Bangladesh U-20 team in the 2025 SAFF U-20 Women's Championship, where she scored 4 goals in 6 matches. She scored a hat-trick there against Bhutan U-20.

In the same year, her team qualified for the 2026 AFC U-20 Women's Asian Cup, with her scoring an Olympico goal against Timor-Leste U-20.

== Personal life ==
Shanti Mardi is Santal.

Shanti has stated that her role model is Ritu Porna Chakma, while her favourite footballer is Lionel Messi.

== Honours ==
Bangladesh U20

- SAFF U-20 Women's Championship: 2025
