= Faisal Ahmed Shitol =

Bangladeshi footballer

Personal information
- Full name: Mohammed Faisal Ahmed Shitol
- Date of birth: 21 November 1997 (age 28)
- Place of birth: Tangail, Bangladesh
- Height: 1.75 m (5 ft 9 in)
- Position: Striker

Team information
- Current team: Uttar Baridhara
- Number: 7

Youth career
- –2013: BKSP

Senior career*
Years	Team	Apps	(Gls)
2013–2014	BKSP		(14)
2014	Victoria SC	18	(7)
2014–2015	Feni SC		(0)
2015–2017	Uttar Baridhara		
2017–2021	Dhaka Abahani	23	(4)
2022	Bangladesh Police	12	(1)
2022–2023	Muktijoddha Sangsad	4	(0)
2023	Sheikh Russel KC	4	(1)
2024–	Uttar Baridhara	0	(0)
- * Club domestic league appearances and goals as of 15 July 2023

Faisal Ahmed Shitol (Bengali: ফয়সাল আহমেদ শীতল; born 21 November 1996) is a Bangladeshi footballer who plays as a striker for and captains Dhaka Senior Division League club Uttar Baridhara.

== Club career ==
Faisal a BKSP student, scored 14 goals in the Third Division in 2013 while representing the institutes football team. The following season, he joined Victoria SC in the 2014 Championship League, where he would score 7 goals.

He made hit top-tier debut with Feni Soccer Club in the 2014–15 Premier League. The following season, Shitol joined Uttar Baridhara Club and on 15 October 2016, Shitol scored his first Premier League goal in a 1–3 defeat to Chittagong Abahani. Nonetheless, Uttar Baridhara were relegated to the Championship League at the end of the season.

In 2017, Shitol joined Premier League club, Dhaka Abahani. On 2 December 2018, Shitol scored a brace as Abahani defeated Muktijoddha Sangsad KC 2–1 in the 2018 Independence Cup group-stage. On 18 January 2019, Shitol scored as Abahani defeated NoFeL SC 2–1 in the opening game of the 2018–19 Premier League.

== International career ==
Shitol was selected in the 23-man squad for the 2020 AFC U-23 Championship qualifiers by coach Jamie Day.

== Honours ==
- Federation Cup: 2018
