= BRTC Sports Club =

Association football club in Bangladesh

- Full name: Bangladesh Road Transport Corporation Sports Club
- Short name: BRTCSC
- Founded: 1966; 60 years ago
- Owner: Bangladesh Road Transport Corporation
- President: Dr. Anupam Saha
- Head Coach: Md Nejamat Ali
- League: Bangladesh Championship League
- 2025–26: 4th of 10
Home colours	Away colours

BRTC Sports Club (Bengali: বিআরটিসি স্পোর্টস ক্লাব), also referred to as BRTC SC, is a professional football club based in RAJUK Avenue in Dhaka, Bangladesh. The club currently competes in the Bangladesh Championship League, the second tier of Bangladeshi football, after completing professional league licensing for the 2024–25 season.

== History ==
=== Early years ===
Established as EPRTC Sports Club in Dhaka in 1966 by the East Pakistan Road Transport Corporation (now Bangladesh Road Transport Corporation), the club was renamed to BRTC Sports Club following the Independence of Bangladesh. The club entered domestic football through the Fourth Division and earned promotion as champions in 1967. The club were eventually crowned champions of the Third Division in 1969, resulting in their promotion to the Second Division. On 16 October 1973, the BRTC defeated Arambagh KS 3–2 on penalties in the Second Division title decider to secure their promotion to the First Division.

=== Yo-yo years ===
In 1974, the club completed its first season in the 16 team top-tier in 14th position, six points clear of relegation. Nevertheless, in 1975, BRTC finished bottom of the league table, with 19 points from 30 games, resulting in their relegation. In 1982, the team led by star-striker, Monir Hossain Manu, won the Second Division title decider 2–0 against Muktijoddha Sangsad KC at the Dhaka Stadium, completing their return to the First Division after eight years. Following the game, the BRTC clubhouse was vandalised by the Muktijoddha fans, who also injured a few of the club's players.

Nevertheless, the club's second stint in the top-tier was much more successful, as they reached the Super League round in 1984, under coach Mari Chowdhury, and again in 1988-89 under coach Ashraf Chowdhury. The club also finished in the top-half of the table regularly, for the half a decade. In 1985 and 1987, the club reached the semi-finals of the Federation Cup, before eventually being defeated by Dhaka Abahani and Mohammedan, respectively.

In the 1992 First Division, the club finished 15th in what was the league's final season as top-tier, due to the introduction of the Premier Division league in 1993. BRTC along with the bottom ten club's from the 1992 top-tier remained in the second-tier First Division following its resumption, ending their decade-long status as a top-tier club. Eventually, they finished second from bottom in the First Division that season and were relegated to the Second Division. The club returned to the First Division in 1996 after securing promotion as runners-up from the 1995 Second Division, which concluded in 1996.

=== Hiatus ===
In 2005, the club were again relegated from the First Division, finishing in 8th place with 10 points from 14 games. The club also opted out of the Second Division, which was held in 2008 after a two year absence, resulting in automatic relegation to the Third Division. The club began participating in the Third Division from 2011 and were eventually relegated in 2015. Their third relegation in a span of a decade meant that the club would now have to participate in the amateur Pioneer League. However, due to financial constraints faced by the Road Transport Corporation, the club eventually went on decade-long hiatus.

=== Professional league era ===
In 2025, encouraged by BRTC Chairman Md Tazul Islam and club president Dr. Anupam Saha, the club confirmed its return to domestic football by meeting the professional licensing criteria required to participate in the country's second-tier league, the Bangladesh Championship League. The club president also stated that they would aim to form a team capable of qualifying for the Bangladesh Premier League and would seek potential players from among their 5,000 employees. This marks the first time the club will participate in a professional league since the introduction of the Premier League in 2007 and the Championship League in 2012.

== Current squad ==
As of 25 January 2026

Note: Flags indicate national team as defined under FIFA eligibility rules; some limited exceptions apply. Players may hold more than one non-FIFA nationality.

No.	Pos.	Nation	Player
2	DF	BAN	Md Sagor Sarkar
4	DF	BAN	Shakil Hossain
5	DF	BAN	Rifat Hossain (Captain)
7	MF	BAN	Sheikh Galibe Newaz
13	MF	BAN	Md A Sattar Razu
19	MF	BAN	Md Miraj Sarkar
20	MF	BAN	Nayan Miah
21	MF	BAN	Rubuyeat Hossain
22	GK	BAN	Joy Chakraborty
23	MF	BAN	Al-Amin
26	FW	BAN	Rashichandra Tripura
28	FW	BAN	Md Arif Hawlader
29	MF	BAN	Sanjid Zaman Peash
31	MF	BAN	Md Monir Hossain
33	FW	BAN	Mohon Aknd
36	MF	BAN	Md Al Imran
37	DF	BAN	Md Ibrahim Khalil
38	MF	BAN	Md Atikor Rahman

No.	Pos.	Nation	Player
39	MF	BAN	Md Ashik Sharkar
40	GK	BAN	Sakib Kumar Bala
41	GK	BAN	Md Mahbub Sharkar
42	GK	BAN	Md Saiful Islam
43	MF	BAN	Md Sabbir Hossain
44	DF	BAN	Kazi Nazrul Islam
45	FW	BAN	Rakibul Haque Emon
55	DF	BAN	Anowarul Azim Rana
56	DF	BAN	Md Nur Jahan
66	DF	BAN	Md Foysal
70	MF	BAN	Md Emon Islam Babu
71	DF	BAN	Sahidul Islam
75	FW	BAN	Md Atiqur Rahman Atik
77	FW	BAN	Md Golam Rabby
80	MF	BAN	Sadman Sakib Riyad
88	MF	BAN	Mohiuddin
99	FW	BAN	Md Asad Bhuiyan

== Team records ==
=== Head coach record ===
As of 3 May 2026

Head Coach	From	To	P	W	D	L	GF	GA	%W
(Bangladesh) Md Murad Ahamed Milon	2 January 2025	14 April 2025	9	1	4	4	6	16	11.11
(Bangladesh) Md Anowar Hosan	15 April 2025	Present	9	2	6	1	9	9	22.22
(Bangladesh) Md Nejamat Ali	25 January 2025	Present	18	7	6	5	21	14	38.89

== Personnel ==
=== Current technical staff ===
As of 22 May 2025

Position	Name
Team Manager	(Bangladesh) Saikul Islam
Assistant Manager	(Bangladesh) Md Moniruzzaman Babu
Team Leader	(Bangladesh) Md Amjad Hossain
Head Coach	(Bangladesh) Md Anowar Hosan
Assistant Coach	(Bangladesh) Md Kabir Hossen
Goalkeeper Coach	(Bangladesh) Kyapruechai Marma
Trainer	(Bangladesh) Md Sharif Bhuiyan
Media Officer	(Bangladesh) Md Masud Talukder
Physiotherapist	(Bangladesh) Md Sheak Mahabubur Rakonan
Equipment Officer	(Bangladesh) Mohammad Jahangir Hossain Azad

== Management ==
=== Board of directors ===
As of 2 March 2025

Position	Name
Chairman	(Bangladesh) Abdul Latif Mollah
President	(Bangladesh) Dr. Anupam Saha
General Secretary	(Bangladesh) Md Moniruzzaman Babu

== Honours ==
- Dhaka Second Division League
  - Champions (2): 1973, 1982
  - Runners-up (1): 1995
- Dhaka Third Division League
  - Champions (1): 1969
- Dhaka Fourth Division League
  - Champions (1): 1967

== See also ==
- List of football clubs in Bangladesh
- History of football in Bangladesh
