= Dhaka Rangers FC =

Bangladeshi association football club

- Full name: Dhaka Rangers Football Club
- Short name: DRFC
- Founded: 2022; 4 years ago
- Ground: BSSS Mostafa Kamal Stadium
- Capacity: 25,000
- President: Tanzir Rahman Zim
- Head coach: Md Mahbub Ali Manik
- League: Bangladesh Championship League
- 2025–26: 7th of 10
Home colours	Away colours

Dhaka Rangers Football Club (Bengali: ঢাকা রেঞ্জার্স ফুটবল ক্লাব), simply known as Dhaka Rangers, is a Bangladeshi professional football club based in Dhaka. The club currently competes in the Bangladesh Championship League, the second-tier of Bangladeshi football.

== History ==
The club was founded in 2022 in Dhaka, Bangladesh. Initially focusing on women's football, in January 2025, the club completed the required licensing process to enter men's football through the Bangladesh Championship League.

== Current squad ==
As of 25 January 2026

Note: Flags indicate national team as defined under FIFA eligibility rules; some limited exceptions apply. Players may hold more than one non-FIFA nationality.

No.	Pos.	Nation	Player
2	DF	BAN	Mijanur Rahman
3	DF	BAN	Md Sagor Mia
4	DF	BAN	Yusuf Mia
6	FW	BAN	Md Emon Hossain
7	MF	BAN	Nayon Mia
8	MF	BAN	Suaibur Rahman Mijan
10	FW	BAN	Md Roton
12	DF	BAN	Md Asif
13	FW	BAN	Ariyan Shikder
14	DF	BAN	Anik Mree (Captain)
17	MF	BAN	Khandaker Khalid Hassan
18	MF	BAN	Md Jaforulla Sharafat
19	FW	BAN	Md Rayhan
20	FW	BAN	Md Al Amin Rahman
22	GK	BAN	Mohammad Rasel
24	FW	BAN	Md Rubel
25	DF	BAN	Nazim Uddin
28	FW	BAN	Md Rakibul Islam

No.	Pos.	Nation	Player
30	GK	BAN	Md Robiul Karim
31	DF	BAN	Nazrul Islam
33	FW	BAN	Mehedi Hasan Bhuiyan
34	DF	BAN	Rejaul Karim Anike
35	DF	BAN	Miraj Ahammed
36	MF	BAN	Iqbal Hossain
40	DF	BAN	Mohamed Atikuzzaman
41	MF	BAN	Md Habib Mia
44	DF	BAN	Ripon Mia
56	DF	BAN	Md Marajul Islam
71	GK	BAN	Mong Hla Sing Marma
71	FW	BAN	Khaled Hasan
77	FW	BAN	Md Shamim Shahed
78	FW	BAN	Md Sagor
97	FW	BAN	Md Soiful Hasan
98	DF	BAN	Md Abdul Hady
99	DF	BAN	Sadman Sadik Antu

== Competitive record ==
Record as Professional Football League member
Season	Division	League								Federation Cup	Independence Cup	Top league scorer(s)	
Season	Division	P	W	D	L	GF	GA	Pts	Position	Federation Cup	Independence Cup	Player	Goals
2025–26	BCL	18	6	5	7	23	24	23	6th	—	—	(Bangladesh) Md Rimu Ahmed	5

Champions	Runners-up	Promoted	Relegated

== Team records ==
=== Head coach record ===
As of 3 May 2026

Head Coach	From	To	P	W	D	L	GF	GA	%W
(Bangladesh) Md Shofikul Hasan Polash	20 January 2025	present	18	6	5	7	22	28	33.33
(Bangladesh) Md Mahbub Ali Manik	25 January 2026	Present	18	6	5	7	23	24	33.33

== Personnel ==
=== Current coaching staff ===
As of 2 February 2025

Position	Name
Team Manager	(Bangladesh) Hazrat Ali
Team Leader	(Bangladesh) Tanjir Rahman Zim
Assistant Manager	(Bangladesh) Rakibul Islam
Head Coach	(Bangladesh) Md Mahabub Ali Manik
Assistant Coach	(Bangladesh) Md Shofikul Hasan Polash
Media Manager	(Bangladesh) Md Myzidul Islam Maruf
Equipment Officer	(Bangladesh) Nury Alom Nayan
Doctor	(Bangladesh) Syed Shamim Ahsan
Masseur	(Bangladesh) Subash Soren (Bangladesh) Yusuf Kamara

== See also ==
- Dhaka Rangers FC Women
- List of football clubs in Bangladesh
- History of football in Bangladesh
