= Somaj Kallyan KS Mugda =

Association football club based in Dhaka, Bangladesh

Somaj Kallyan KS Mugda সমাজ কল‍্যাণ কেএস মুগদা
- Full name: Somaj Kallyan Krira Sangsad Mugda
- Nickname: Mugda
- Founded: 1979
- Owner: Nayeem Rahman
- President: Hasan Islam
- Head Coach: Ali Asgar Naser
- League: Dhaka Senior Division League
- 2025–26: 15th of 17
Home colours	Away colours

Somaj Kollyan KS Mugda (Bengali: সমাজ কল‍্যাণ কেএস মুগদা) is a Bangladeshi football club based in Dhaka. It currently comepetes in the Dhaka Senior Division League, the third-tier of Bangladeshi football.

== History ==
Based in Dhaka, Somaj Kallyan KS Mugda was established in 1979.

The club were crowned league champions of the 2021–22 Dhaka Senior Division League, however, their entry to the country's second-tier, the Bangladesh Championship League, was denied as they failed to attain professional league license.

== Current squad ==
As of 1 November 2025

Note: Flags indicate national team as defined under FIFA eligibility rules; some limited exceptions apply. Players may hold more than one non-FIFA nationality.

No.	Pos.	Nation	Player
1	GK	BAN	Md Ershad
2	DF	BAN	Md Mahfuzur Rahman
3	DF	BAN	Md Shaharul Islam
4	DF	BAN	Md Mehedi Hasan
5	DF	BAN	Md Sharuk Hossain
6	DF	BAN	KM Hasib Reza Limon
7	MF	BAN	Md Ainal Haque
8	MF	BAN	Atikur Rahman Atik
9	MF	BAN	Md Rayhan Mia (Captain)
10	FW	BAN	Md Mahbubul Biswas Munna
11	FW	BAN	Md Ibrahim
12	MF	BAN	Jahidul Islam
13	DF	BAN	Hirok Mondol
14	DF	BAN	Fahad Mia
15	DF	BAN	Md Akash Hossain
16	DF	BAN	Md Azad Ali
17	FW	BAN	Md Imran

No.	Pos.	Nation	Player
18	MF	BAN	Md Uzzol Molla
19	FW	BAN	Md Yeasin Ali
20	FW	BAN	Md Uzzal Hossain
21	FW	BAN	Md Mosharaf Mia
22	GK	BAN	Al Amin
23	MF	BAN	Md Hasan Mia
24	FW	BAN	Md Rubel Hossain
25	FW	BAN	Md Bashiruzzaman
26	FW	BAN	Md Habibur Rahman
27	MF	BAN	Arman Hasan
28	FW	BAN	Md Mashiur Rahman
29	DF	BAN	Md Raju Mia
30	GK	BAN	Abu Huraira
31	MF	BAN	Md Hafizur Rahman Pramanik
33	FW	BAN	Masum Billah Sujon
34	FW	BAN	Abu Bakkar Siddik
35	DF	BAN	Md Rakib

== Personnel ==
=== Current coaching staff ===
As of 1 July 2024

Position	Name
Team Manager	(Bangladesh) Abul Kalam Azad
Team Leader	(Bangladesh) Md Mozammel Hoque
Assistant Manager	(Bangladesh) Rokon Uddin Helal
Head Coach	(Bangladesh) Suopon Barua
Assistant Coach	(Bangladesh) Md Emdadul Hoque
Media Manager	(Bangladesh) Mizuddin
Equipment Manager	(Bangladesh) Md Rokan Uddin Masum
Fitness Trainer	(Bangladesh) Md Shahzuddin
Ball Boy	(Bangladesh) Rahmot Mia

== Team records ==
=== Head coach record ===
As of 18 January 2026

Head Coach	From	To	P	W	D	L	GS	GA	%W
(Bangladesh) Gazi Jasim Uddin	5 June 2022	30 November 2022	13	9	4	0	21	8	69.23
(Bangladesh) Suopon Barua	30 May 2024	15 August 2025	7	1	0	6	4	14	14.29
(Bangladesh) Ali Asgar Naser	3 July 2025	Present	16	4	3	9	15	24	25.00

== Honours ==
- Dhaka Senior Division League
  - Champions (1): 2021–22
- Dhaka Second Division League
  - Champions (1): 2018–19
- Dhaka Third Division League
  - Runners-up (1): 2013
