= Little Friends Club =

Association football club in Bangladesh

- Founded: 1974; 52 years ago
- Ground: BSSS Mostafa Kamal Stadium
- Capacity: 25,000
- General Secretary: Amer Khan
- Head Coach: Jashim Mehedi
- League: Senior Division Football League
- 2025–26: Bangladesh Championship League, 9th of 10 (relegated)

Little Friends Club (Bengali: লিটল ফ্রেন্ডর্স ক্লাব) is a Bangladeshi professional football club based in Gopibagh, Dhaka. It currently competes in the Bangladesh Championship League is a second-tier Bangladeshi football league.

== Current squad ==
As of 25 January 2026

Note: Flags indicate national team as defined under FIFA eligibility rules; some limited exceptions apply. Players may hold more than one non-FIFA nationality.

No.	Pos.	Nation	Player
1	GK	BAN	Md Antor Ali
2	DF	BAN	Md Emon Babu Jibon
3	DF	BAN	Md Rasel Hossain
4	DF	BAN	Aung Cho Tun
5	DF	BAN	Md Sohel Hossain Mim
6	MF	BAN	Md Shagar
7	MF	BAN	Md Rakib
8	MF	BAN	Md Ahasanul Haque Tanim
9	FW	BAN	Tuhidul Islam Riday
10	MF	BAN	Md Amir Ali
11	FW	BAN	Md Al Mirad
12	DF	BAN	Md Fazle Rabbi
13	MF	BAN	Md Emon Islam Babu
14	DF	BAN	Md Rabiul Alam
15	DF	BAN	Muzhaid Islam Ramim
16	MF	BAN	Md Raja Ansari
17	FW	BAN	Md Bijoy Mia
18	MF	BAN	Muhammad Razib

No.	Pos.	Nation	Player
19	MF	BAN	U Sing Thowai Marma
20	FW	BAN	Mohammad Shofiq Rahman
21	DF	BAN	Md Sabbir Hossain
22	GK	BAN	Md Toha Alam
23	MF	BAN	Md Saiful Islam
24	MF	BAN	Rediwan Hasan Lingkon
25	MF	BAN	Mintu Rema
26	DF	BAN	Md Shain
27	DF	BAN	Shakim Mia
28	DF	BAN	Md Shakil Khan
30	GK	BAN	Ani Ghazi
31	FW	BAN	Md Nahid Hasan
32	FW	BAN	Md Mursalin
33	FW	BAN	Arbit Ray
35	GK	BAN	Md Momanul Haque Maheun
36	DF	BAN	Md Sumon Miah
37	MF	BAN	Md Shahadat Hosen

== Team records ==
=== Head coach record ===
As of 3 May 2026

Head Coach	From	To	P	W	D	L	GF	GA	%W
(Bangladesh) Md Abdullah Zahid	20 October 2022	30 May 2023	20	3	2	15	11	40	15.00
(Bangladesh) Rikon Chakma	20 February 2024	Present	24	6	8	10	24	36	25.00
(Bangladesh) Jashim Mehedi	5 October 2025	Present	18	3	4	11	16	44	16.67

== Personnel ==
=== Current technical staff ===
As of 20 February 2025

Position	Name
Head coach	(Bangladesh) Rikon Chakma
Media Officer	(Bangladesh) Milon Khan
Team Manager	(Bangladesh) A Zaman Eazaz
Team Leader	(Bangladesh) Md Shafiqul Islam
Interpreter	(Bangladesh) Gopinath Dey
Doctor	(Bangladesh) Dr Md Abu Selim
Massecur	(Bangladesh) Md Raju Ahmed (Bangladesh) Manuyel Murmu
Trainer	(Bangladesh) Md Kamal Hossain
Equipment Manager	(Bangladesh) Tapan Talukdar
Technical Director	(Bangladesh) Amin Khan

== Competitive record ==
Season	Division	League								Federation Cup	Independence Cup	Top league scorer(s)	
Season	Division	P	W	D	L	GF	GA	Pts	Position	Federation Cup	Independence Cup	Player	Goals
2024–25	BCL	18	5	6	7	18	20	21	5th	—	—	(Bangladesh) Md Amir Ali	4
2025–26	BCL	18	3	3	12	16	43	12	9th (Relegated)	—	—	(Bangladesh) Md Bappy Hossain	4

Champions	Runners-up	Third place	Promoted	Relegated

== Honours ==
- Dhaka Third Division League
  - Champions (1): 2002
  - Runners-up (1): 1994
