= City Club (football) =

- Full name: Mirpur Sports & Physical Culture Center & City Club
- Short name: MSPCCCC
- Founded: 1972; 54 years ago
- Ground: City Club Ground, Mirpur
- President: Md Tareque Al Mamun
- Head Coach: Abdul Kayum Sentu
- League: Bangladesh Football League
- 2025–26: Bangladesh Championship League, 2nd of 10 (promoted)
| Home colours | Away colours |

City Club (Bengali: সিটি ক্লাব), also known as Mirpur Sports & Physical Culture Center or MSPCC City Club, is a Bangladeshi professional football club based in the Mirpur, Dhaka. It competes in the Bangladesh Football League, the top-tier of Bangladeshi football from 2026.

== History ==
The club was established in 1972 as Mirpur Sports & Physical Culture Center (MSPCC) in Mirpur, Dhaka. In 1982, a few of the club's founders, including the co-founder and later club captain, Hossain Mollah, bought Dhaka Second Division Football League club, Shahjahanpur SC, for Tk 1 lakh. In 1983, after both MSPCC and Shahjahanpur completed their merger, its general secretary, the late Sadeque Hossain Khoka, renamed the newly merged club as City Club.

In 2010, the club showed interest in turning fully professional and was rumored to take part in the second-tier professional football league, the Bangladesh Championship League. However, by the time the league got underway in 2012, the club's interest faded. In 2017, the club finished runners-up in the Pioneer Football League, which is the sixth-tier. They were directly promoted to the fourth-tier, the Dhaka Second Division Football League and took part in the 2018–19 league season.

== Current squad ==
As of 3 September 2026

Note: Flags indicate national team as defined under FIFA eligibility rules; some limited exceptions apply. Players may hold more than one non-FIFA nationality.

| No. | Pos. | Nation | Player |
|---|---|---|---|
| 1 | GK | BAN | Md Ishaque Akando |
| 2 | DF | BAN | Md Noyon Mia |
| 3 | DF | NEP | Yogesh Gurung |
| 4 | DF | GAM | Foday Darboe |
| 5 | DF | BAN | Tanvir Hossain |
| 6 | MF | BAN | Md Farhad Mia |
| 7 | MF | BAN | Md Sayde |
| 8 | MF | BAN | Ashraful Haque Asif |
| 9 | FW | NGR | Onyekachi Okafor |
| 10 | MF | GAM | Solomon King Kanform (captain) |
| 11 | FW | BAN | Rafiqul Islam |
| 12 | FW | PAK | Shayak Dost |
| 14 | MF | BAN | Md Imran Islam Anu |
| 15 | MF | BAN | Md Mithu |
| 16 | MF | BAN | Md Mijanur Rahman |
| 17 | FW | BAN | Enamul Islam Gazi |
| 18 | FW | BAN | Sajed Hasan Jummon Nijum |
| 19 | DF | BAN | Rajon Howladar |

| No. | Pos. | Nation | Player |
|---|---|---|---|
| 20 | FW | BAN | Piash Ahmed Nova |
| 21 | FW | BAN | Afroj Ali |
| 22 | GK | BAN | Shakib Ali Hasan |
| 23 | DF | BAN | Kamaci Marma Aky |
| 25 | GK | BAN | SP Rafiz |
| 26 | DF | BAN | Md Istekharul Alam Shakil |
| 27 | DF | BAN | Md Jaynal Abeden Dipu |
| 28 | DF | BAN | Rasel Ahmed |
| 30 | GK | BAN | Md Saddam Hossam |
| 31 | FW | BAN | Md Opu Rahnum |
| 32 | FW | BAN | Md Aminul Islam |
| 34 | DF | BAN | Md Rakib Hossain |
| 35 | FW | BAN | Daniel Mamunul |
| 37 | FW | BAN | Md Khairul Islam |
| 38 | FW | BAN | Md Owskurum Ahmed |
| 39 | FW | BAN | Shahriar Ahammed Shuvo |
| 40 | FW | BAN | Mohammad Eusha Bin Khalek |

== Competitive record ==
Results are only available since their return to the Dhaka Second Division Football League in the 2018–19 season.

Record as Dhaka Football League member
| Season | Division | League | | | | | | | | Federation Cup | Independence Cup | Top league scorer(s) | | |
| Season | Division | P | W | D | L | GF | GA | Pts | Position | Federation Cup | Independence Cup | Player | Goals | |
|---|---|---|---|---|---|---|---|---|---|---|---|---|---|---|
| 2018–19 | Division | Second Division | 12 | 4 | 2 | 6 | N/A | N/A | 14 | N/A | DNP | DNP | Arif Sumon | 3 |
| 2021–22 | Division | Second Division | 8 | 1 | 5 | 2 | 5 | 8 | 8 | 6th Group Stage | DNP | DNP | Touhidul & Fazlul | 2 |
| 2022–23 | Division | Second Division | TBD | | | | | | | | | | | |

| Champions | Runners-up | Promoted | Relegated |

== Team records ==
=== Head coach record ===
As of 21 July 2026

| Head Coach | From | To | P | W | D | L | GF | GA | %W |
|---|---|---|---|---|---|---|---|---|---|
| (Bangladesh) Md Mahabub Ali Manik | 5 January 2025 | 22 May 2025 | 18 | 8 | 7 | 3 | 28 | 14 | 44.44 |
| (Bangladesh) Md Mahabubul Haque Juwel | 10 October 2025 | 6 May 2026 | 18 | 10 | 6 | 2 | 32 | 7 | 55.56 |
| (Bangladesh) Abdul Kayum Sentu | 21 July 2026 | Present | 0 | 0 | 0 | 0 | 0 | 0 | — |

== Personnel ==
=== Current technical staff ===
As of 22 November 2026

| Position | Name |
|---|---|
| Head coach | (Bangladesh) Abdul Kayum Sentu |
| Team Manager | (Bangladesh) Amir Hossain Babul |
| Goalkeeping Coach | (Bangladesh) Nuruzzaman Nayan |
| Assistant Coach | (Bangladesh) Md Mahbubul Haque Jewel |
| Physiotherapist | (Bangladesh) Fuad Hasan Hawlader |
| Media Manager | (Bangladesh) Md Saruare Alam Khan |
| Masseur | (Bangladesh) Md Yunus |

== Honours ==
- Bangladesh Championship League
  - Runners-up (1): 2025–26
- Dhaka Third Division League
  - Champions (1): 2000
- Dhaka Second Division League
  - Runners-up (1): 2003–04
- Pioneer Football League
  - Runners-up (1): 2017
