= 2024–25 Fakirerpool Young Men's Club season =

Fakirerpool Young Men's Club 2024–25 football season

Fakirerpool YMC
2024–25 season
- President: Anwar Hossain Makhon
- Head coach: Albert Lyapin
- Stadium: Shaheed Barkat Stadium
- Bangladesh Premier League: 8th
- Federation Cup: Group stages
- Independence Cup: Did Not Held
- Top goalscorer: League: Ben Ibrahim Ouattara (6 goals); All: Ben Ibrahim Ouattara (6 goals)
- Biggest win: 0–7 Vs Bashundhara Kings (Home); Premier League; 20 May 2025
- Biggest defeat: 4–1 Vs Dhaka Wanderers Club (Home); Premier League; 17 January 2025

The 2023–24 season is Fakirerpool Young Men's Club's 64th season in existence and 1st season in the Bangladesh Premier League. It also marks the club's return to top-flight football following their relegation from the 2003–04 Dhaka Premier League. In addition to the domestic league, Fakirerpool are participated in this season's Federation Cup. The season covers the period from 1 June 2024 to 27 May 2025.

== Transfer ==
=== In ===
| No. | Pos | Player | Previous club | Fee | Date | Source |
|---|---|---|---|---|---|---|
| 3 | DF | Jintu Mia | Sheikh Russel KC | Free | 22 August 2024 | |
| 4 | DF | (Uzbekistan) Solibek Karimov | Unattached | Free | 22 August 2024 | |
| 26 | DF | (Nigeria) Segun Oduduwa | (Nigeria) Nath Boys FC | Free | 22 August 2024 | |
| 13 | DF | Md Sabbir Hossain | Brothers Union | Free | 22 August 2024 | |
| 17 | DF | Amit Hasan | Chittagong Abahani Limited | Free | 22 August 2024 | |
| 55 | DF | Md Rasel Hossain | Bangladesh Police FC | Free | 22 August 2024 | |
| 9 | MF | (Uzbekistan) Evgeniy Kochnev | Unattached | Free | 22 August 2024 | |
| 10 | MF | (Uzbekistan) Sardor Jakhonov | (India) TARU | Free | 22 August 2024 | |
| 23 | MF | Md Arifur Rahman Shemanto | Sheikh Jamal DC | Free | 22 August 2024 | |
| 66 | MF | Md Jahid Hossain | Dhaka Wanderers | Free | 22 August 2024 | |
| 7 | FW | (Uzbekistan) Akobir Turaev | (Tajikistan) Ravshan Kulob | Free | 22 August 2024 | |
| 11 | FW | Mehedi Hasan Hridoy | Sheikh Jamal DC | Free | 22 August 2024 | |
| 18 | FW | Md Sayed Hossen Sayem | Abahani Limited Dhaka | Free | 22 August 2024 | |
| 90 | FW | Sakib Beprai | Abahani Limited Dhaka | Free | 22 August 2024 | |

=== Retained ===
| No. | Pos | Player | Date | Source |
|---|---|---|---|---|
| 1 | GK | Tayeb Siddique | 1 June 2024 | |
| 25 | GK | Md Shaju Ahamed | 1 June 2024 | |
| 30 | GK | Rubel Mia | 1 June 2024 | |
| 2 | DF | Md Mosharaf Hossain Shanto | 1 June 2024 | |
| 5 | DF | Raficul Islam | 1 June 2024 | |
| 16 | DF | Yeasin Mia Rajib | 1 June 2024 | |
| 19 | DF | Md Rakib Rahman | 1 June 2024 | |
| 33 | DF | Tias Das | 1 June 2024 | |
| 6 | MF | Md Sagor Hossain | 1 June 2024 | |
| 15 | MF | Md Sumon Islam | 1 June 2024 | |
| 8 | MF | Samor Joy Tanchangya | 1 June 2024 | |
| 14 | MF | Shiblal Tudo | 1 June 2024 | |
| 20 | MF | Shanto Tudo | 1 June 2024 | |
| 27 | MF | Md Shiab Mia | 1 June 2024 | |
| 99 | FW | Anik Hossain Siam | 1 June 2024 | |
| 21 | FW | Mehedi Hasan Polash | 1 June 2024 | |
| 24 | FW | Md Ifran Hossain | 1 June 2024 | |
| 77 | FW | Rafayel Tudu | 1 June 2024 | |
| 88 | FW | Dalim Barman | 1 June 2024 | |
| 49 | DF | Mohammad Emon | 1 June 2024 | |

== Competitions ==
Win Draw Loss Fixtures

=== Overall ===
| Competition | First match | Last match | Final Position |
|---|---|---|---|
| BPL | 30 November 2024 | 29 May 2025 | 8th |
| Federation Cup | 24 December 2024 | 31 January 2025 | Group stage |

=== Overview ===
| Competition | Record | | | | | | | |
| Competition | Pld | W | D | L | GF | GA | GD | Win % |
|---|---|---|---|---|---|---|---|---|
| BPL | 18 | 6 | 1 | 11 | 23 | 54 | −31 | 33.33 |
| Federation Cup | 4 | 0 | 1 | 3 | 4 | 16 | −12 | 0.00 |
| Total | 22 | 6 | 2 | 14 | 27 | 70 | −43 | 27.27 |

Source: Competitions

=== Premier League ===
==== League table ====
| Pos | Team | Pld | W | D | L | GF | GA | GD | Pts | Qualification or relegation |
|---|---|---|---|---|---|---|---|---|---|---|
| 6 | Fortis | 18 | 6 | 9 | 3 | 24 | 15 | +9 | 27 | |
| 7 | Bangladesh Police | 18 | 8 | 3 | 7 | 23 | 24 | −1 | 27 | |
| 8 | Fakirerpool | 18 | 6 | 1 | 11 | 23 | 54 | −31 | 19 | |
| 9 | Dhaka Wanderers (R) | 18 | 3 | 1 | 14 | 14 | 55 | −41 | 10 | Relegation to BCL |
| 10 | Chittagong Abahani (R) | 18 | 1 | 0 | 17 | 7 | 50 | −43 | 3 | Relegation to BCL |

Source: Soccerway
Rules for classification: 1) Points; 2) Goal difference; 3) Goals scored.
(R) Relegated

==== Results summary ====
| Overall | | | | | | | | Home | | | | | | Away | | | | | |
| Pld | W | D | L | GF | GA | GD | Pts | W | D | L | GF | GA | GD | W | D | L | GF | GA | GD |
|---|---|---|---|---|---|---|---|---|---|---|---|---|---|---|---|---|---|---|---|
| 18 | 6 | 1 | 11 | 23 | 54 | −31 | 19 | 2 | 0 | 7 | 12 | 34 | −22 | 4 | 1 | 4 | 11 | 20 | −9 |

Source: Soccerway

==== Results by round ====
| Round | 1 | 2 | 3 | 4 | 5 | 6 | 7 | 8 | 9 | 10 | 11 | 12 | 13 | 14 | 15 | 16 | 17 | 18 |
|---|---|---|---|---|---|---|---|---|---|---|---|---|---|---|---|---|---|---|
| Ground | H | A | H | A | H | A | A | H | A | A | H | A | H | A | H | H | A | H |
| Result | L | L | L | W | L | L | L | W | W | L | L | D | W | W | L | L | W | L |
| Position | 7 | 8 | 8 | 9 | 9 | 9 | 8 | 8 | 8 | 8 | 8 | 8 | 8 | 8 | 8 | 8 | 8 | 8 |

Source: Matches
A = Away; H = Home; W = Win; D = Draw; L = Loss; P = Postponed

=== Matches ===
| 30 November 2024 1 | Fakirerpool YMC | 0–2 | Dhaka Abahani | Gazipur |
| 14:30 BST (UTC+6) | Md Sumon Islam (yellow card) 26'; Oduduwa Segun Tope (yellow card) 26'; Sardor Jahonov (yellow card) 52' | Report | Enamul 71'; Jafar 90+6' | Stadium: Shaheed Barkat Stadium; Referee: Sabuj Das |

| 7 December 2024 2 | Bangladesh Police | 4–1 | Fakirerpool YMC | Mymensingh |
| 14:30 BST | Tobias Quintana (yellow card) 40'; Joyonto Kumer Roy 45'; Manik 52'; Al Amin 65', 81' | Report | Turaev 9'; Solibek Karimov (yellow card) 85' | Stadium: Rafiq Uddin Bhuiyan Stadium; Referee: Jasim Akhter |

| 13 December 2024 3 | Fakirerpool YMC | 0–3 | Fortis FC | Gazipur |
| 14:30 BST (UTC+6) | Mehedi Hasan Polash (yellow card) 60'; Turaev (yellow card) 86' | Report | Essa Jallow (yellow card) 21'; Omar Sarr 52'; Nova 57', 85'; Babou (yellow card) 59' | Stadium: Shaheed Barkat Stadium; Referee: Anisur Rahman Sagor |

| 21 December 2024 4 | Chittagong Abahani | 0–2 | Fakirerpool YMC | Mymensingh |
| 14:30 BST (UTC+6) | | Report | Mohamed Sayed Hossain Sayem 55'; Solibek Karimov (yellow card) 90+2'; Jakhonov 90+4' | Stadium: Rafiq Uddin Bhuiyan Stadium; Referee: Bhubon Mohon Tarafder |

| 28 December 2024 5 | Fakirerpool YMC | 1–6 | Rahmatganj MFS | Gazipur |
| 14:30 BST (UTC+6) | A. Turaev 7' (pen.) (yellow card) 90+2' | Report | S. Boateng 25', 72'; Mohammed Mamun Alif (yellow card) 27'; Istekharul Alam Shakil (yellow card) 56'; T. Uddin 62'; N. Jibon 66'; R. Howlader 54', 90+6' | Stadium: Shaheed Barkat Stadium; Referee: Golam Mourshed Chowdhury Nayon |

| 3 January 2025 6 | Brothers Union | 3–0 | Fakirerpool YMC | Munshiganj |
| 14:45 BST (UTC+6) | Mustapha Drammeh 10'; Cheikh Sene 34'; Mouhamed Becaye Diarra (yellow card) 41'; Sazzad 42'; Sushanto (yellow card) 71' | Report | | Stadium: Shaheed Bir Sreshtho Flight Lieutenant Matiur Rahman Stadium; Referee: Mohammed Jalal Uddin |

| 10 January 2025 7 | Bashundhara Kings | 4–1 | Fakirerpool YMC | Dhaka |
| 17:30 BST (UTC+6) | Fernandes 69'; Foysal 72'; Rafiqul 75'; Rakib 83' | Report | Tutul 2' (o.g.); Tias Das (yellow card) 11' (yellow-red card) 33'; Md Sabbir Hossain (yellow card) 33'; Segun Oduduwa (yellow card) 45+2' | Stadium: Bashundhara Kings Arena; Referee: Anisur Rahman Sagor |

| 17 January 2025 8 | Fakirerpool YMC | 4–1 | Dhaka Wanderers | Gazipur |
| 14:45 BST (UTC+6) | Rafael 17'; Md Ganto (yellow card) 40'; Evgeniy Kochnev 48'; Jakhonov (yellow card) 67' (goal) 69'; Turaev 82' (pen.) | Report | Nazmul (yellow card) 20'; Sakib Bepari (yellow card) 72' (goal) 90+3' | Stadium: Shaheed Barkat Stadium; Referee: Nazmul Huda |

| 24 January 2025 9 | Mohammedan SC | 0–1 | Fakirerpool YMC | Cumilla |
| 14:45 BST (UTC+6) | Sunday (yellow card) 90+5'; Sanowar Hossain Lal (yellow card) 90+11' | Report | Jakhonov 66'; Md Ganto (yellow card) 73'; Solibek Karimov (yellow card) 86' | Stadium: Shaheed Dhirendranath Datta Stadium; Referee: Anisur Rahman Sagor |

| 20 February 2025 10 | Dhaka Abahani | 6–1 | Fakirerpool YMC | Cumilla |
| 15:00 BST (UTC+6) | Emon (yellow card) 21'; Ridoy 39'; Shakil (yellow card) 45+2'; Enamul 54', 61'; Yeasin (yellow card) 65'; Ibrahim 78'; Jafar 84'; Mirajul 90+2' | Report | Md Ganto (yellow card) 4'; Sayed Hossain Sayem 14' | Stadium: Shaheed Dhirendranath Datta Stadium; Referee: Bituraj Barua |

| 11 April 2025 11 | Fakirerpool YMC | 0–3 | Bangladesh Police | Gazipur |
| 15:30 BST (UTC+6) | | Report | M. S. Bablu 71', 85'; D. Roy 79' | Stadium: Shaheed Barkat Stadium; Referee: Md Jalal Uddin |

| 25 April 2025 12 | Fortis FC | 1–1 | Fakirerpool YMC | Dhaka |
| 15:30 BST (UTC+6) | O. Ifegwu 33'; A. Fahad (yellow card) 52'; Md Sarwan Jahan Nipu (red card) 56'; MD Forhad Mona (yellow card) 80'; Kamacai Marma Aky (yellow card) 87' | Report | Mohamed Fofana (yellow card) 45'; Ben Ibrahim Quattara 65' | Stadium: Bashundhara Kings Arena; Referee: Jashim Akther |

| 3 May 2025 13 | Fakirerpool YMC | 3–2 | Chittagong Abahani | Gazipur |
| 15:45 BST (UTC+6) | Ben Ibrahim Quattara 34', 75'; Shanto Tudo (yellow card) 83'; Dalim Rahman (yellow card) 83'; Sayed Hossain Sayem 90+1'; Md Ganto (yellow card) 90+3' | Report | Mohamed Shadin (yellow card) 19'; Shuvo Raj Bongshi 33'; Sajon Mia (yellow card) 45+3'; Youssouf Bamba (yellow card) 62'; Sohanur Rahman (yellow card) 68'; Faysal Ahmed 90+3' | Stadium: Shaheed Barkat Stadium; Referee: Sabuj Das |

| 10 May 2025 14 | Rahmatganj MFS | 1–2 | Fakirerpool YMC | Munshigonj |
| 16:00 BST (UTC+6) | M. Oshie (yellow card) 50'; R. Howladar 90'; Istekharul Alam Shakil (yellow card) 90+9' | Report | Md Irfan Hossain 26'; Shibal Tudo (yellow card) 35'; Md Shaju Ahmed (yellow card) 45+3'; Md Mosharaf Hossain Shanto 53' | Stadium: Shaheed Bir Sreshtho Flight Lieutenant Matiur Rahman Stadium; Referee: Bituraj Barua |

| 16 May 2025 15 | Fakirerpool YMC | 1–4 | Brothers Union | Gazipur |
| 16:00 BST (UTC+6) | Ben Ibrahim Ouattara 15'; Mohamed Fofana (yellow card) 56' | Report | Turaev 30' (pen.) (red card) 57'; Mfon 38', 68'; Mouhamed Becaye Diarra (yellow card) 61'; Sushanto (yellow card) 70' (goal) 77' | Stadium: Shaheed Barkat Stadium; Referee: Nasir Uddin |

| 20 May 2025 16 | Fakirerpool YMC | 0–7 | Bashundhara Kings | Gazipur |
| 16:00 BST (UTC+6) | Shanto Tudo 22'; Mohamed Fofana 52'; Ben Ibrahim Ouattara (yellow card) 57' | Report | Rakib 23', 68', 77', 88'; Asror Gofurov 36'; Fahim 38'; Rafiqul 47'; Daciel Santos (yellow card) 57'; Sohel (yellow card) 78' | Stadium: Shaheed Barkat Stadium; Referee: Nazmul Huda |

| 23 May 2025 17 | Dhaka Wanderers | 1–2 | Fakirerpool YMC | Gazipur |
| 16:00 BST (UTC+6) | Parvej Ahmed (yellow card) 27'; Mohammad Habibur Rahman (yellow card) 83'; Khusan Ganizhonov 83' | Report | Jahid Hossain (yellow card) 39'; Ben Ibrahim Ouattara 22', 72' | Stadium: Shaheed Barkat Stadium; Referee: Taposh Roy |

| 27 May 2025 18 | Fakirerpool YMC | 1–6 | Mohammedan SC | Gazipur |
| 16:00 BST (UTC+6) | Shanto Tudo 86' | Report | Diabate 7', 23', 38', 71', 90'; Sourav Dewan 81' | Stadium: Shaheed Barkat Stadium; Referee: Bhubon Mohon Tarafder |

=== Federation Cup ===
==== Group B ====
| Pos | Team | Pld | W | D | L | GF | GA | GD | Pts | Qualification |
|---|---|---|---|---|---|---|---|---|---|---|
| 1 | Dhaka Abahani | 4 | 4 | 0 | 0 | 9 | 0 | +9 | 12 | Qualify for QRF 1 |
| 2 | Rahmatganj MFS | 4 | 3 | 0 | 1 | 10 | 2 | +8 | 9 | Advance to QRF 2 |
| 3 | Mohammedan | 4 | 2 | 0 | 2 | 11 | 4 | +7 | 6 | |
| 4 | Fakirerpool YMC | 4 | 0 | 1 | 3 | 4 | 16 | −12 | 1 | |
| 5 | Chittagong Abahani | 4 | 0 | 1 | 3 | 2 | 14 | −12 | 1 | |

Source: Soccerway
Rules for classification: Group stages tiebreakers

| 24 December 2024 | Rahmatganj MFS | 6–0 | Fakirerpool YMC | Mymensingh |
| 14:30 BST (UTC+6) | Maraz 12'; Jibon 45+3', 57', 76'; Boateng 53'; Mohammed Toha 90+3' | Report | | Stadium: Rafiq Uddin Bhuiyan Stadium; Referee: Md Alamgir Sarker; Man of the Match: Nabib Newaj Jibon (Rahmatganj) |

| 7 January 2025 | Chittagong Abahani | 2–2 | Fakirerpool YMC | Mymensingh |
| 14:30 BST (UTC+6) | Saiful Islam 12'; Sabuz 80' | Report | Turaev 21'; Shanto Tudo 73' | Stadium: Rafiq Uddin Bhuiyan Stadium; Referee: Taposh Roy; Man of the Match: Shanto Tudo (Fakirerpool) |

| 21 January 2025 | Dhaka Abahani | 3–0 | Fakirerpool YMC | Cumilla |
| 14:30 BST (UTC+6) | Yeasin 65' (pen.); Murad 68'; Mahdi Yusuf Khan 71' | Report | | Stadium: Shaheed Dhirendranath Datta Stadium; Referee: Md Nasir Uddin; Man of the Match: Mahdi Yusuf Khan (Dhaka Abahani) |

| 31 January 2025 | Fakirerpool YMC | 2–5 | Mohammedan SC | Mymensingh |
| 14:30 BST (UTC+6) | Rafayel Tudu 35'; Turaev 40' (pen.) | Report | Moin 10', 27'; Raju Ahmed Zisan 72'; Arif Hossain 81', 84' | Stadium: Rafiq Uddin Bhuiyan Stadium; Referee: Sabuj Kumar Das; Man of the Match: Moinul Islam Moin (Dhaka Mohammedan) |

== Statistics ==
=== Goalscorers ===
As of 27 May 2025

| Rank | Player | Position | Total | BPL | Federation Cup |
|---|---|---|---|---|---|
| 1 | (Ivory Coast) Ben Ibrahim Ouattara | FW | 6 | 6 | 0 |
| 2 | (Uzbekistan) Akobir Turaev | FW | 5 | 3 | 2 |
| 3 | (Uzbekistan) Sardor Jakhonov | MF | 4 | 4 | 0 |
| 4 | (Bangladesh) Md Sayed Hossen Sayem | FW | 3 | 3 | 0 |
| 5 | (Bangladesh) Shanto Tudo | MF | 2 | 1 | 1 |
| 5 | (Bangladesh) Rafayel Tudu | FW | 2 | 1 | 1 |
| 7 | (Bangladesh) Md Mosharaf Hossain Shanto | DF | 1 | 1 | 0 |
| 7 | (Bangladesh) Irfan Hossain | DF | 1 | 1 | 0 |
| Total | | 24 | 20 | 0 | 4 |
