= 2025–26 PWD Sports Club season =

Club 2025–26 football season

PWD Sports Club
2025–26 season
- Owner: Public Works Department
- General Secretary: Moshiur Rahman Akondo
- Head coach: Md Anwar Hossain
- Stadium: Shaheed Barkat Stadium
- Bangladesh Football League: TBD
- Federation Cup: TBD
- Independence Cup: TBD
| Home colours | Away colours |

The 2025–26 season is PWD Sports Club's 71st season in existence and 1st season in the Bangladesh Football League. It also marks the club's return to top-flight football following their relegation from the 1994 Dhaka Premier Division League. In addition to the domestic league, PWD Sports Club will participate in this season's Federation Cup and Independence Cup. The season covers the period from 1 June 2025 to May 2026.

== Players ==
As of 15 August 2025.

| No. | Player | Nat. | Position(s) | Date of birth | Year signed | Previous club |
Goalkeepers
| 1 | Md Sarwar Jahan | (Bangladesh) | GK | 5 August 1986 (aged 38) | 2025 | Fortis FC |
| 22 | Md Anik Ahamed | (Bangladesh) | GK | | 2024 | Gopalganj SC |
| 28 | Md Rahul Hossain | (Bangladesh) | GK | | 2025 | Chittagong Abahani |
| 30 | Md Tahsin Saheb | (Bangladesh) | GK | | 2025 | BKSP |
Defenders
| 2 | Md Sazal Islam Kalin | (Bangladesh) | RB | 5 July 1995 (aged 29) | 2025 | Mohammedan SC |
| 3 | Md Rashedul Islam Rashed | (Bangladesh) | RB/LB | 15 January 1990 (aged 35) | 2025 | Fortis FC |
| 4 | Sumon Kumar Das | (Bangladesh) | CB | 25 January 1993 (aged 32) | 2025 | Dhaka Wanderers |
| 5 | Ashikur Rahman | (Bangladesh) | CB | 17 June 2009 (aged 15) | 2025 | BFF Elite Academy |
| 12 | Md Hasibul Hasan Shanto | (Bangladesh) | LB | 15 March 2002 (aged 23) | 2025 | Uttar Baridhara |
| 13 | Md Ratul | (Bangladesh) | RB | 11 July 2006 (aged 18) | 2025 | BFF Elite Academy |
| 16 | Md Tanvir Rana | (Bangladesh) | ? | | 2024 | |
| 24 | Md Imran Khan | (Bangladesh) | CB/RB | 2 February 2006 (aged 19) | 2025 | Dhaka Wanderers |
| 25 | Md Saimon | (Bangladesh) | ? | | 2025 | |
| 26 | Md Sabbir Hossen | (Bangladesh) | ? | | 2025 | |
| 27 | Kofi Junior Dabanka | (Ghana) | LB/CB | 7 July 2003 (aged 21) | 2025 | Chittagong Abahani |
| 35 | Joyanto Lal | (Bangladesh) | LB/RB | 2 February 2006 (aged 19) | 2024 | Wari Club |
| 44 | Md Rostom Islam Dukhu Mia | (Bangladesh) | RB/CB | 13 December 2005 (aged 19) | 2025 | Brothers Union |
Midfielders
| 6 | Md Abdullah | (Bangladesh) | CM | | 2025 | |
| 7 | Md Rumon Hossain | (Bangladesh) | AM/RM | 13 January 1995 (aged 30) | 2024 | Chittagong Abahani |
| 8 | Md Sohanur Rahman Sohan | (Bangladesh) | AM/CM | 20 November 1999 (aged 25) | 2025 | Chittagong Abahani |
| 10 | Mohammad Abdullah | (Bangladesh) | AM/RM | 16 October 1997 (aged 27) | 2025 | Fortis FC |
| 14 | Md Sharif | (Bangladesh) | CM/AM | 12 April 2005 (aged 20) | 2025 | Wari Club |
| 18 | Sohel Hassan Rana | (Bangladesh) | CM | | 2025 | Kingstar SC |
| 20 | Md Mazharul Islam Sourav | (Bangladesh) | DM/CM | 1 January 1990 (aged 35) | 2025 | Fortis FC |
| 23 | Md Rakibul Islam | (Bangladesh) | CM | 15 December 2007 (aged 17) | 2025 | Little Friends Club |
| 36 | Md Mahin Sheikh | (Bangladesh) | CM | | 2025 | |
| 37 | Anthony Amoh | (Bangladesh) | DM/CM/AM | 6 June 2000 (aged 24) | 2025 | (Bhutan) Southern City FC |
| 45 | Md Salahuddin | (Bangladesh) | CM | | 2025 | |
Forwards
| 9 | Arman Foysal Akash | (Bangladesh) | LW/CF | 13 January 2004 (aged 21) | 2025 | Dhaka Abahani |
| 11 | Md Minhazul Karim Shadin | (Bangladesh) | LW/RW | 10 March 2002 (aged 23) | 2025 | Dhaka Wanderers |
| 15 | Md Jamir Uddin | (Bangladesh) | LW | 12 December 2002 (aged 22) | 2025 | Arambagh KS |
| 19 | Md Toriqul Islam Julfikar | (Bangladesh) | CF | 10 June 1997 (aged 27) | 2025 | Farashganj SC |
| 21 | Md Abu Sayed | (Bangladesh) | RW | 13 November 2008 (aged 16) | 2025 | BKSP |
| 32 | Akobir Turaev | (Uzbekistan) | CF | 3 November 1996 (aged 28) | 2025 | Brothers Union |
| 34 | Said Rakib Khan Evan | (Bangladesh) | LW | 1 December 1998 (aged 26) | 2025 | Brothers Union |

== Friendlies ==
=== Pre-season ===
| 21 September 2025 | Rahmatganj MFS | 1–1 | PWD | Dhaka |
| 16:30 BST (UTC+6) | Solomon King | | N/A | Stadium: Rahmatganj Practice Field |

== Transfer ==
=== In ===
| No. | Pos | Player | Previous club | Fee | Date | Source |
|---|---|---|---|---|---|---|
| 9 | FW | Arman Foysal Akash | Dhaka Abahani | Free | 2 July 2025 | |
| 37 | MF | (Ghana) Anthony Amoh | (Bhutan) Southern City FC | Free | 1 August 2025 | |
| 32 | FW | (Uzbekistan) Akobir Turaev | Brothers Union | Free | 1 August 2025 | |
| 24 | DF | Imran Khan | Dhaka Wanderers | Free | 7 August 2025 | |
| 10 | DF | Mohammad Abdullah | Mohammedan SC | Free | 9 August 2025 | |
| 44 | DF | Md Rostam Islam Dukhu Mia | Free Agent | Free | 10 August 2025 | |
| 2 | DF | Md Sazal Islam Kalin | Mohammedan SC | Free | 15 August 2025 | |
| 1 | GK | Md Sarwar Jahan | Fortis FC | Free | 15 August 2025 | |
| 30 | GK | Md Tahsin Saheb | BKSP | Free | 15 August 2025 | |
| 3 | DF | Md Rashedul Islam Rashed | Fortis FC | Free | 15 August 2025 | |
| 20 | MF | Md Mazharul Islam Sourav | Fortis FC | Free | 15 August 2025 | |
| 8 | MF | Md Sohanur Rahman Sohan | Chittagong Abahani | Free | 15 August 2025 | |
| 34 | MF | Said Rakib Khan Evan | Chittagong Abahani | Free | 15 August 2025 | |
| 28 | GK | Md Rahul Hossain | Chittagong Abahani | Free | 15 August 2025 | |
| 27 | DF | (Ghana) Kofi Junior Dabanka | Chittagong Abahani | Free | 15 August 2025 | |
| 19 | FW | Md Toriqul Islam Julfiqar | Farashganj SC | Free | 15 August 2025 | |
| 23 | MF | Md Rakibul Islam | Little Friends Club | Free | 15 August 2025 | |
| 19 | DF | Md Hasibul Hasan Shanto | Uttar Baridhara | Free | 15 August 2025 | |
| 15 | FW | Md Jamir Uddin | Arambagh KS | Free | 15 August 2025 | |

=== Out ===
| No. | Pos | Player | Moved to | Fee | Date | Source |
|---|---|---|---|---|---|---|
| 1 | GK | Md Jasim Uddin | Free Agent | Released | 1 May 2025 | |
| 3 | DF | Md Rifat Hasan Sarthok | Free Agent | Released | 1 May 2025 | |
| 6 | MF | Razuan Kabir | Free Agent | Released | 1 May 2025 | |
| 9 | FW | Md Rajib | Free Agent | Released | 1 May 2025 | |
| 12 | FW | Albart Collins Tripura | Free Agent | Released | 1 May 2025 | |
| 13 | MF | Md Imran Islam Anu | Free Agent | Released | 1 May 2025 | |
| 14 | MF | Md Ridoy Hossen | Free Agent | Released | 1 May 2025 | |
| 15 | MF | Md Tanin Sarker | Free Agent | Released | 1 May 2025 | |
| 16 | DF | Mear Ekhlash Hossain | Free Agent | Released | 1 May 2025 | |
| 17 | FW | Md Rashed Babu | Free Agent | Released | 1 May 2025 | |
| 18 | MF | Aksh Ali | Free Agent | Released | 1 May 2025 | |
| 19 | FW | Md Akikul Islam | Free Agent | Released | 1 May 2025 | |
| 23 | DF | Md Azad Ali | Free Agent | Released | 1 May 2025 | |
| 24 | FW | Md Imran | Free Agent | Released | 1 May 2025 | |
| 25 | DF | Tanjim Islam | Free Agent | Released | 1 May 2025 | |
| 27 | MF | Hira Gosh | Free Agent | Released | 1 May 2025 | |
| 28 | MF | Sanjed Alom Nesan | Free Agent | Released | 1 May 2025 | |
| 30 | GK | Mostafa Khan | Free Agent | Released | 1 May 2025 | |
| 32 | MF | Md Abu Tareq | Free Agent | Released | 1 May 2025 | |
| 34 | DF | Md Asraful Islam | Free Agent | Released | 1 May 2025 | |
| 35 | GK | Md Anisul Haque Rana | Free Agent | Released | 1 May 2025 | |
| 29 | DF | Gausul Akbar Sabin | Brothers Union | Free | 15 August 2025 | |

== Competitions ==
Win Draw Loss Fixtures

=== Overall ===
| Competition | First match | Last match | Final Position |
|---|---|---|---|
| BFL | | | |
| Federation Cup | | | |
| Independence Cup | | | |

=== Overview ===
| Competition | Record | | | | | | | |
| Competition | Pld | W | D | L | GF | GA | GD | Win % |
|---|---|---|---|---|---|---|---|---|
| BPL | 0 | 0 | 0 | 0 | 0 | 0 | +0 | — |
| Independence Cup | 0 | 0 | 0 | 0 | 0 | 0 | +0 | — |
| Federation Cup | 0 | 0 | 0 | 0 | 0 | 0 | +0 | — |
| Total | 0 | 0 | 0 | 0 | 0 | 0 | +0 | — |

Source: Competitions

=== Premier League ===
==== League table ====
| Pos | Team | Pld | W | D | L | GF | GA | GD | Pts | Qualification or relegation |
|---|---|---|---|---|---|---|---|---|---|---|
| 6 | Mohammedan | 9 | 2 | 4 | 3 | 10 | 11 | −1 | 10 | |
| 7 | Brothers Union | 9 | 2 | 3 | 4 | 8 | 13 | −5 | 9 | |
| 8 | Fakirerpool | 9 | 2 | 3 | 4 | 9 | 18 | −9 | 9 | |
| 9 | PWD | 9 | 1 | 4 | 4 | 7 | 14 | −7 | 7 | Relegation for the Bangladesh Championship League |
| 10 | Arambagh | 9 | 1 | 2 | 6 | 4 | 15 | −11 | 5 | Relegation for the Bangladesh Championship League |

Updated to match(es) played on 3 January 2026. Source: Soccerway
Rules for classification: 1) Points; 2) Goal difference; 3) Number of goals scored.

==== Results summary ====
| Overall | | | | | | | | Home | | | | | | Away | | | | | |
| Pld | W | D | L | GF | GA | GD | Pts | W | D | L | GF | GA | GD | W | D | L | GF | GA | GD |
|---|---|---|---|---|---|---|---|---|---|---|---|---|---|---|---|---|---|---|---|
| 0 | 0 | 0 | 0 | 0 | 0 | 0 | 0 | 0 | 0 | 0 | 0 | 0 | 0 | 0 | 0 | 0 | 0 | 0 | 0 |

==== Results by round ====
| Round | 1 | 2 | 3 | 4 | 5 | 6 | 7 | 8 | 9 | 10 | 11 | 12 | 13 | 14 | 15 | 16 | 17 | 18 |
|---|---|---|---|---|---|---|---|---|---|---|---|---|---|---|---|---|---|---|
| Ground | | | | | | | | | | | | | | | | | | |
| Result | | | | | | | | | | | | | | | | | | |
| Position | | | | | | | | | | | | | | | | | | |

Source: Matches
A = Away; H = Home; W = Win; D = Draw; L = Loss; P = Postponed

=== Matches ===
| 2025 1 | v |
| : BST (UTC+6) |

| 2025 2 | v |
| : BST (UTC+6) |

| 2025 3 | v |
| : BST (UTC+6) |

| 2025 4 | v |
| : BST (UTC+6) |

| 2025 5 | v |
| : BST (UTC+6) |

| 2025 6 | v |
| : BST (UTC+6) |

| 2025 7 | v |
| : BST (UTC+6) |

| 2025 8 | v |
| : BST (UTC+6) |

| 2025 9 | v |
| : BST (UTC+6) |

=== Federation Cup ===
| Pos | Team | Pld | W | D | L | GF | GA | GD | Pts | Qualification |
|---|---|---|---|---|---|---|---|---|---|---|
| 1 | Brothers Union | 2 | 1 | 1 | 0 | 1 | 0 | +1 | 4 | Qualified for QRF 1 |
| 2 | PWD SC | 1 | 1 | 0 | 0 | 2 | 0 | +2 | 3 | Advanced to QRF 2 |
| 3 | Dhaka Abahani | 2 | 1 | 0 | 1 | 4 | 3 | +1 | 3 | |
| 4 | Rahmatganj | 1 | 0 | 1 | 0 | 0 | 0 | 0 | 1 | |
| 5 | Fakirerpool | 2 | 0 | 0 | 2 | 2 | 6 | −4 | 0 | |

Updated to match(es) played on 9 December 2025. Source: Sofascore
Rules for classification: Group stages tiebreakers

== Statistics ==
=== Goalscorers ===
As of 2025

| Rank | No. | Pos. | Nat. | Player | BFL | Independence Cup | Federation Cup | Total |
|---|---|---|---|---|---|---|---|---|
| | | | | | 0 | 0 | 0 | 0 |
| Total | | | | | 0 | 0 | 0 | 0 |

Source: Matches

=== Assists ===
| Rank | No. | Pos. | Nat. | Player | BFL | Independence Cup | Federation Cup | Total |
|---|---|---|---|---|---|---|---|---|
| | | | | | 0 | 0 | 0 | 0 |
| Total | | | | | 0 | 0 | 0 | 0 |

Source: []
