= 2024–25 Rahmatganj MFS season =

Rahmatganj MFS 2024–25 football season

Rahmatganj MFS
2024–25 season
- Chairman: Haji Mohammad Salim
- Head coach: Sheikh Zahidur Rahman Milon
- Bangladesh Premier League: 4th of 10
- Federation Cup: Semi-finals
- Independence Cup: Did not held
- Top goalscorer: League: Samuel Boateng (19 goals); All: Samuel Boateng (22 goals)
- Biggest win: 6–0 Vs Fakirerpool YMC 24 December 2024 (Federation Cup); 6–1 Vs Fakirerpool YMC (Away) 28 December 2024 (Premier League); 6–1 Vs Dhaka Wanderers Club (Home) 4 January 2025 (Premier League)
- Biggest defeat: 1–4 Vs Bashundhara Kings (Away) 14 December 2024 (Premier League)

The 2024–25 season was Rahmatganj MFS's 92nd season since its establishment in 1933 and its 15th season in the Bangladesh Premier League. In addition to domestic league, Rahmatganj MFS participated in this season's edition of Federation Cup. This season are covered the period from 1 June 2024 to 29 May 2025.

== Current squad ==
As of 6 April 2024

Rahmatganj MFS squad for 2024–25 season.

Note: Flags indicate national team as defined under FIFA eligibility rules; some limited exceptions apply. Players may hold more than one non-FIFA nationality.

No.	Pos.	Nation	Player
1	GK	BAN	Azad Hossain
2	DF	UZB	Iskandar Siddikzhonov
3	DF	BAN	Mahamudul Hasan Kiron
4	DF	BAN	Masud Rana Mridha
5	MF	GHA	Mamoud Oshie
6	MF	BAN	Arafat Hossain
7	MF	BAN	Md Sayde
8	MF	BAN	Mohammad Munna
9	FW	BAN	Khondoker Ashraful Islam
10	FW	BAN	Nabib Newaj Jibon
11	FW	GHA	Felix Tetteh
12	FW	BAN	Md Nahian
13	MF	BAN	Mohammad Arabi
14	DF	BAN	Tanvir Hossain
15	DF	BAN	Sushanto Tripura (vice-captain)
16	MF	BAN	Nazmul Islam Rasel
17	DF	BAN	Md Soeb Mia
18	MF	GAM	Dawda Ceesay (captain)

No.	Pos.	Nation	Player
19	MF	BAN	Md Rajon Howleder
20	FW	BAN	Samin Yasir Juel
21	DF	BAN	Nurul Naium Faisal
22	GK	BAN	Shimul Kumar Das
23	FW	GHA	Ernest Boateng
24	MF	BAN	Rofiqul Islam Sumon
25	GK	BAN	Md Arman Hossain
26	FW	BAN	Murad Hossain Chowdhury
27	FW	BAN	Jewel Rana
28	FW	BAN	Mohammed Fahim Nur Toha
29	DF	BAN	Md Sagor Sarkar
30	GK	BAN	Md Nayem
31	FW	BAN	Md Emon Hossain
32	MF	BAN	Ridaynul Islam Sagor
33	MF	BAN	Tonmoy Das
77	MF	UZB	Ikhtiyor Tashpulatov
98	MF	EGY	Mostafa Kahraba

== Transfer ==
=== In ===
No.	Pos	Player	Previous club	Fee	Date	Source
21	DF	Ariful Islam Jitu	Sheikh Russel KC	Free	30 July 2024	
4	DF	Masud Rana Mridha	Abahani Limited Dhaka	Free	30 July 2024	
99	FW	Nihat Jaman Ucchash	Sheikh Russel KC	Free	30 July 2024	
14	DF	Tanvir Hossain	Sheikh Russel KC	Free	31 July 2024	
8	FW	Mohamed Munna	Sheikh Russel KC	Free	2 August 2024	
15	DF	Md Taj Uddin	Sheikh Jamal DC	Free	21 August 2024	
3	DF	Mahamudul Hasan Kiron	Sheikh Jamal DC	Free	21 August 2024	
25	GK	Shahidul Alam Sohel	Abahani Limited Dhaka	Free	22 August 2024	
10	FW	Nabib Newaj Jibon	Abahani Limited Dhaka	Free	22 August 2024	
17	FW	Mehedi Hasan Royal	Abahani Limited Dhaka	Free	22 August 2024	
27	DF	Raihan Hasan	Chittagong Abahani Limited	Free	22 August 2024	
30	GK	Ahsan Habib Bipu	Bangladesh Police FC	Free	22 August 2024	
16	MF	Maraz Hossain Opi	Abahani Limited Dhaka	Free	22 August 2024	
24	MF	Akkas Ali	Sheikh Jamal DC	Free	22 August 2024	
23	DF	Alfaj Mia	Sheikh Jamal DC	Free	22 August 2024	
18	FW	(Ghana) Samuel Boateng	(Ghana) Asante Kotoko SC	Free	22 August 2024	
11	FW	(Ghana) Felix Tetteh	(Eswatini) Royal Leopards	Free	22 August 2024	
5	MF	(Ghana) Mamoud Oshie	(Ghana) Bibiani Gold Stars	Free	22 August 2024	

=== Out ===
No.	Pos	Player	Moved to	Fee	Date	Source
23	FW	(Ghana) Ernest Boateng	Mohammedan SC	Free transfer	4 June 2024	
2	DF	(Uzbekistan) Iskandar Siddikzhonov	Unattached	Released	11 May 2024	
15	DF	Sushanto Tripura	Brothers Union	Free transfer	14 June 2024	
33	MF	Tonmoy Das	Abahani Limited Dhaka	Free transfer	22 August 2024	
27	FW	Jewel Rana	Mohammedan SC	Free transfer	22 August 2024	

== Preseason friendly ==
5 November 2024 Friendly	Rahmatganj MFS	1–0	Mohammedan SC	Banani
14:00 BST (UTC+6)	Tanvir 76'			Stadium: Army Stadium

== Competitions ==
Win Draw Loss Fixtures

=== Overall ===
Competition	First match	Last match	Final Position
BPL	30 November 2024	27 May 2025	4th
Federation Cup	10 December 2024	15 April 2025	Semi-finals
Independence Cup	Did not held		

=== Overview ===
Competition	Record							
Competition	Pld	W	D	L	GF	GA	GD	Win %
BPL	18	9	3	6	39	25	+14	50.00
Independence Cup; Did not held	0	0	0	0	0	0	+0	—
Federation Cup	5	4	0	1	13	3	+10	80.00
Total	23	13	3	7	52	28	+24	56.52

Source: Competitions

=== Premier League ===
==== League table ====
Pos	Team	Pld	W	D	L	GF	GA	GD	Pts	Qualification or relegation
2	Dhaka Abahani	18	10	5	3	31	8	+23	35	Qualification for the AFC Challenge League qualifying stage
3	Bashundhara Kings (W)	18	9	5	4	45	15	+30	32	Qualification for the AFC Challenge League qualifying stage (Note: as Federation Cup winners.)
4	Rahmatganj	18	9	3	6	39	25	+14	30	
5	Brothers Union	18	7	6	5	28	18	+10	27	
6	Fortis	18	6	9	3	24	15	+9	27	

Source: Soccerway
Rules for classification: 1) Points; 2) Goal difference; 3) Goals scored.
(W) Cup Winner

==== Results summary ====
Overall								Home						Away					
Pld	W	D	L	GF	GA	GD	Pts	W	D	L	GF	GA	GD	W	D	L	GF	GA	GD
18	9	3	6	39	25	+14	30	5	1	3	20	10	+10	4	2	3	19	15	+4

Source: Soccerway

==== Results by round ====
Round	1	2	3	4	5	6	7	8	9	10	11	12	13	14	15	16	17	18
Ground	H	A	A	H	A	H	H	H	A	A	H	H	A	H	A	A	A	H
Result	W	W	L	W	W	W	L	L	L	L	W	D	D	L	W	W	D	W
Position	3	2	6	3	2	2	3	3	4	4	4	4	4	4	4	5	5	4

Source: Matches
A = Away; H = Home; W = Win; D = Draw; L = Loss; P = Postponed

=== Matches ===
19 November 2024 1	Rahmatganj MFS	3–1	Fortis	Munshigonj
14:30 BST (UTC+6)	Istekharul Alam Shakil (yellow card) 26'; Mamoud Oshie 59'; M. Taj 67'; Felix Tetteh 70'	Report	Jasur Jumaev (yellow card) 26'; M. Manik 74'	Stadium: Shaheed Bir Sreshtho Flight Lieutenant Matiur Rahman Stadium; Referee: Bituraj Barua

6 December 2024 2	Chittagong Abahani	0–2	Rahmatganj MFS	Mymensingh
14:30 BST (UTC+6)		Report	Mamoud Oshie (yellow card) 47'; Jibon 55', 68'; Kiron (yellow card) 58'	Stadium: Rafiq Uddin Bhuiyan Stadium; Referee: Md Mizanur Rahman

14 December 2024 3	Bashundhara Kings	4–1	Rahmatganj MFS	Dhaka
17:30 BST (UTC+6)	Fernandes 10'; Figueira 45+1'; Sohel 53'; Topu 76'	Report	Jibon 12'	Stadium: Bashundhara Kings Arena; Referee: Jasim Akhter

21 December 2024 4	Rahmatganj MFS	3–1	Brothers Union	Munshigonj
14:30 BST (UTC+6)	S. Boateng 2', 90+6'; Mamoud Oshie (yellow card) 73'; N. Jibon 79'	Report	Cheikh Sene (yellow card) 30' (goal) 70' (pen.); S. Hossain (red card) 75'	Stadium: Shaheed Bir Sreshtho Flight Lieutenant Matiur Rahman Stadium; Referee: Bituraj Barua

28 December 2024 5	Fakirerpool YMC	1–6	Rahmatganj MFS	Gazipur
14:30 BST (UTC+6)	A. Turaev 7' (pen.) (yellow card) 90+2'	Report	S. Boateng 25', 72'; Mohammed Mamun Alif (yellow card) 27'; Istekharul Alam Shakil (yellow card) 56'; T. Uddin 62'; N. Jibon 66'; R. Howlader 54', 90+6'	Stadium: Shaheed Barkat Stadium; Referee: Golam Mourshed Chowdhury Nayon

4 January 2025 6	Rahmatganj MFS	6–1	Dhaka Wanderers Club	Munshigonj
14:45 BST (UTC+6)	Md Sayde (yellow card) 18'; S. Boateng 23', 37', 44', 63', 66', 70'	Report	Saief Shamsud 50'; Abu Sufian Yousuf Sifat (yellow card) 51'	Stadium: Shaheed Bir Sreshtho Flight Lieutenant Matiur Rahman Stadium; Referee: Abul Kalam Rumon

10 January 2025 7	Rahmatganj MFS	1–3	Mohammedan SC	Munshigonj
14:45 BST (UTC+6)	N. Jibon (yellow card) 44'; S. Boateng 56'; T. Hossain (yellow card) 87'	Report	Raju Ahmed Zisan (yellow card) 27' (goal) 45+1'; M. Muzaffarov (yellow card) 40'; Md Jewel (yellow card) 45'; E. Agbaji (yellow card) 45+4'; S. Diabate 64'; S. Emmanuel 64'	Stadium: Shaheed Bir Sreshtho Flight Lieutenant Matiur Rahman Stadium; Referee: Md Saymoon Hasan Sany

18 January 2025 8	Rahmatganj MFS	0–1	Dhaka Abahani	Munshigonj
14:45 BST (UTC+6)	Arafat Hossain (yellow card) 80'; M. Oshie (yellow card) 90+4'	Report	S. Hossain (yellow card) 45' (goal) 68'; M. Pritom (yellow card) 90+4'	Stadium: Shaheed Bir Sreshtho Flight Lieutenant Matiur Rahman Stadium; Referee: Anisur Rahman Sagor

24 January 2025 9	Bangladesh Police	2–1	Rahmatganj MFS	Mymensingh
14:45 BST (UTC+6)	M. Al-Amin 36', 68'	Report	M. Oshie 25'	Stadium: Rafiq Uddin Bhuiyan Stadium; Referee: Mahaud Zamal Farooque Nahid

21 February 2025 10	Fortis	3–1	Rahmatganj MFS	Dhaka
15:00 BST (UTC+6)	V. Hryshyn 38'; P. Babou 49' (pen.), 90+1'; Abdullah Omar Sajib (yellow card) 45+3'; Md Farhad Mona (yellow card) 73'; Jasur Jumaev (yellow card) 90+3'	Report	M. Oshie (penalty missed) 23' (yellow card) 77'; S. Boateng 54'	Stadium: Bashundhara Kings Arena; Referee: Md Jalal Uddin

11 April 2025 11	Rahmatganj MFS	2–0	Chittagong Abahani	Munshigonj
15:30 BST (UTC+6)	T. Hossain 27'; S. Boateng 44'	Report	Mehebub Hasan Nayan (yellow card) 1'; F. Rabbi (yellow card) 15'; Diamond; Kwasi Adiefe (yellow card) 87'	Stadium: Shaheed Bir Sreshtho Flight Lieutenant Matiur Rahman Stadium; Referee: Md Jalal Uddin

26 April 2025 12	Rahmatganj MFS	0–0	Bashundhara Kings	Munshigonj
15:30 BST (UTC+6)	M. Oshie (yellow card) 34'; M. Royal (yellow card) 87'	Report		Stadium: Shaheed Bir Sreshtho Flight Lieutenant Matiur Rahman Stadium; Referee: Anisur Rahman Sagor

3 May 2025 13	Brothers Union	0–0	Rahmatganj MFS	Munshigonj
15:45 BST (UTC+6)	K. Rabbi (yellow card) 26'; Assan Njie (yellow card) 51'; Becaye Diarra (yellow card) 59'	Report		Stadium: Shaheed Bir Sreshtho Flight Lieutenant Matiur Rahman Stadium; Referee: Md Nasir Uddin

10 May 2025 14	Rahmatganj MFS	1–2	Fakirerpool YMC	Munshigonj
16:00 BST (UTC+6)	M. Oshie (yellow card) 50'; R. Howladar 90'; Istekharul Alam Shakil (yellow card) 90+9'	Report	Md Irfan Hossain 26'; Shibal Tudo (yellow card) 35'; Md Shaju Ahmed (yellow card) 45+3'; Md Mosharaf Hossain Shanto 53'	Stadium: Shaheed Bir Sreshtho Flight Lieutenant Matiur Rahman Stadium; Referee: Bituraj Barua

17 May 2025 15	Dhaka Wanderers Club	1–3	Rahmatganj MFS	Gazipur
16:00 BST (UTC+6)	Princewill Mutah 48'; Md Shawon (yellow card) 66'; Saiful Islam Khan (yellow card) 85'; M. Emon (yellow card) 89'	Report	E. Boateng 1' (pen.) (yellow card) 52'; M. Royal 35' (yellow card) 77'; T. Hossain 84'	Stadium: Shaheed Barkat Stadium; Referee: Anisur Rahman Sagor

21 May 2025 (Note: Soccerway misreported: Samuel Boateng scored in the 84th and 86th minute for Rahmatganj MFS not Mamoud Oshie.) 16	Mohammadan SC	3–4	Rahmatganj MFS	Comilla
13:00 BST (UTC+6)	S. Diabate 2', 37'; S. Emmanuel 5'; Mounzir Coulidiati (yellow card) 83'; Edward Enrique Morillo Jimenéz (yellow card) 90+5'	Report	S. Boateng 10', 84', 86'; Md Taj Uddin 31'	Stadium: Shaheed Dhirendranath Datta Stadium; Referee: Anisur Rahman Sagor

24 May 2025 17	Dhaka Abahani	1–1	Rahmatganj MFS	Comilla
16:00 BST (UTC+6)	Reza (yellow card) 31'; Ogbugh 64'; Yeasin (yellow card) 67'; Emon (yellow card) 79'	Report	Rajon (yellow card) 65'; Boateng 74'	Stadium: Shaheed Dhirendranath Datta Stadium; Referee: Bituraj Barua

27 May 2025 18	Rahmatganj MFS	4–1	Bangladesh Police	Munshigonj
16:00 BST (UTC+6)	S.Boateng 9', 54', 79'; Solomon King Kanform 31'; T.Uddin (yellow card) 37'; T.Hossain (yellow card) 59'	Report	Quipapá 3'; Luis Ibarra (yellow card) 39'; Md Anik Hossain (yellow card) 45+4'	Stadium: Shaheed Bir Sreshtho Flight Lieutenant Matiur Rahman Stadium; Referee: Bituraj Barua

=== Group B ===
Pos	Team	Pld	W	D	L	GF	GA	GD	Pts	Qualification
1	Dhaka Abahani	4	4	0	0	9	0	+9	12	Qualify for QRF 1
2	Rahmatganj MFS	4	3	0	1	10	2	+8	9	Advance to QRF 2
3	Mohammedan	4	2	0	2	11	4	+7	6	
4	Fakirerpool YMC	4	0	1	3	4	16	−12	1	
5	Chittagong Abahani	4	0	1	3	2	14	−12	1	

Source: Soccerway
Rules for classification: Group stages tiebreakers

=== Matches ===
10 December 2024	Mohammedan SC	0–1	Rahmatganj MFS	Dhaka
14:30 BST (UTC+6)	Sunday (yellow card) 72'; Shanto (red card) 85'	Report	Oshie (yellow card) 38'; Rajon 82'	Stadium: Bashundhara Kings Arena; Referee: Bituraj Barua

24 December 2024	Rahmatganj MFS	6–0	Fakirerpool YMC	Mymensingh
14:30 BST (UTC+6)	Maraz 12'; Jibon 45+3', 57', 76'; S. Boateng 53'; Mohammed Toha 90+3'	Report		Stadium: Rafiq Uddin Bhuiyan Stadium; Referee: Md Alamgir Sarker

21 January 2025	Chittagong Abahani	0–3	Rahmatganj MFS	Dhaka
14:30 BST (UTC+6)		Report	M. Kahraba 32'; S. Boateng 42'; Mohammed Toha 70'	Stadium: Bashundhara Kings Arena; Referee: Md Abul Kalamm Rumon

=== Knockout stage ===
8 April 2025 Quarter-finals	Brothers Union	1–2 (a.e.t.)	Rahmatganj MFS	Dhaka
14:45 BST (UTC+6)	Udoh 35'	Report	Boateng 62'; Solomon King Kanform 99'	Stadium: Bashundhara Kings Arena; Referee: Md Nasir Uddin; Man of the Match: Solomon King Kanform (Rahmatganj)

15 April 2025 Quarter-finals	Bashundhara Kings	2–1 (a.e.t.)	Rahmatganj MFS	Dhaka
14:45 BST (UTC+6)	Rakib 82'; Md Insan Hossain 113'	Report	Solomon King Kanform 75'	Stadium: Bashundhara Kings Arena; Referee: Md Jalal Uddin; Man of the Match: Md Saad Uddin (Bashundhara Kings)

== Statistics ==
=== Goalscorers ===
As of 27 May 2025

Rank	Player	Position	Total	BPL	Federation Cup
1	(Ghana) Samuel Boateng	FW	25	21	3
2	(Bangladesh) Nabib Newaj Jibon	FW	8	5	3
3	(Bangladesh) Rajon Howladar	DF	4	3	1
4	(Bangladesh) Md Taj Uddin	FW	3	3	0
4	(The Gambia) Solomon King Kanform	FW	3	1	2
4	(Bangladesh) Md Fahim Nur Toha	FW	2	0	2
4	(Ghana) Mamoud Oshie	MF	2	2	0
4	(Bangladesh) Tanvir Hossain	DF	2	2	0
6	(Bangladesh) Mehedi Hasan Royal	FW	1	1	0
6	(Bangladesh) Maraz Hossain Opi	MF	1	0	1
6	(Ghana) Felix Tetteh	FW	1	1	0
6	(Egypt) Mostafa Kahraba	MF	1	0	1
Total			52	39	13
