= 2025–26 Federation Cup (Bangladesh) Group A =

Group A of the 2025–26 Federation Cup took place from 24 October 2025 to 24 February 2026. The group consisted runners-up of previous tournaments Dhaka Abahani, Brothers Union, Fakirerpool YMC, PWD Sports Club and Rahmatganj MFS.

== Teams ==
Draw position	Team	Appearances	Previous best performance
A1	Dhaka Abahani	36th	Champions (1982, 1985, 1986, 1988, 1997, 1999, 2000, 2010, 2016, 2017, 2018, 2021–22)
A2	Brothers Union	34th	Champions (1980, 1991, 2005)
A3	Fakirerpool YMC	2nd	Group stages (2024–25)
A4	Rahmatganj MFS	36th	Runners-up (2019–20, 2021–22)
A5	PWD Sports Club	1st	TBC

== Standings ==
Pos	Team	Pld	W	D	L	GF	GA	GD	Pts	Qualification
1	Brothers Union	4	3	1	0	5	0	+5	10	Qualified for QRF 1
2	Rahmatganj	4	1	3	0	3	1	+2	6	Advanced to QRF 2
3	PWD SC	4	2	0	2	3	5	−2	6	
4	Dhaka Abahani	4	1	1	2	5	5	0	4	
5	Fakirerpool	4	0	1	3	2	7	−5	1	

Source: Sofascore
Rules for classification: Group stages tiebreakers

== Venues ==
The matches are being played at these two venues across the country.

Cumilla	Dhaka
Shaheed Dhirendranath Datta Stadium	Bashundhara Kings Arena
Capacity: 18,000	Capacity: 6,000
Matches:	Matches:
2025–26 Federation Cup (Bangladesh) Group A is located in Bangladesh

== Matches ==
24 October 2025
14:45

Dhaka Abahani	4–2	Fakirerpool YMC
Diabate 6', 40' (pen.); Morsalin 35', 63'	Report	Shanto Tudu 51'; Mohammad Riyad 69'

Bashundhara Kings Arena, Dhaka
Referee: SM Jashim Akhter
24 October 2025
14:45

Brothers Union	0–0	Rahmatganj MFS
	Report

Shaheed Dhirendranath Datta Stadium, Cumilla
Referee: Md Saymoon Hasan Sany

9 December 2025
14:30

Dhaka Abahani	0–1	Brothers Union
	Report	Monir Alam 17'

Shaheed Dhirendranath Datta Stadium, Cumilla
Referee: Md Saymoon Hasan Sany
9 December 2025
14:30

Fakirerpool YMC	0–2	PWD Sports Club
	Report	A. Turaev 37' (pen.); Mohammed Sharif 65'

Bashundhara Kings Arena, Dhaka
Referee: SM Jashim Akhter

10 March 2026
14:45

Brothers Union	3–0	PWD Sports Club
S. Dost 12'; Kerfala Kouyaté 90+4'; Insan Hossen 90+4'	Report

Bashundhara Kings Arena, Dhaka
Referee: SM Junayed Sharif
10 March 2026
14:45

Rahmatganj MFS	1–1	Dhaka Abahani
E.Boateng 9'	Report	S. Morsalin 45+5' (pen.)

Shaheed Dhirendranath Datta Stadium, Cumilla
Referee: Mahmud Zamal Faruqee Nahid

14 April 2026
14:45

PWD Sports Club	0–2	Rahmatganj MFS
	Report	E. Boateng 51'; J. Ahmed 72'

Bashundhara Kings Arena, Dhaka
Referee: Md Nasrir Uddin
14 April 2026
14:45

Fakirerpool YMC	0–1	Brothers Union
	Report	H. Khattak 71'

Shaheed Dhirendranath Datta Stadium, Cumilla
Referee: Md Anisur Rahman

28 April 2026
14:45

Fakirerpool YMC	0–0	Rahmatganj MFS
	Report

Shaheed Dhirendranath Datta Stadium, Cumilla
Referee: Md Symoon Hasan Sany
28 April 2026
14:45

Dhaka Abahani	0–1	PWD Sports Club
	Report	M. Abdullah 66'

Bashundhara Kings Arena, Dhaka
Referee: Md Nasir Uddin

== See also ==
- 2025–26 Federation Cup Group B
- 2025–26 Bangladeshi football
