= 2025–26 Bangladesh Football League =

18th professional season of the top-flight football league in Bangladesh

Bangladesh Football League
- Season: 2025–26
- Dates: 26 September 2025 – 23 May 2026
- Country: Bangladesh
- Teams: 10
- Champions: Bashundhara Kings (6th BPL title & 6th Bangladeshi title)
- AFC Challenge League: Fortis FC; Bangladesh Police
- Matches: 90
- Goals: 235 (2.61 per match)
- Top goalscorer: 19 goals (Brazil) Dori (Bashundhara Kings)
- Biggest home win: Bashundhara Kings 5–0 Rahmatganj MFS (29 November)
- Biggest away win: Fakirerpool 1–7 Fortis FC (8 May)
- Highest scoring: 8 goals Fakirerpool 1–7 Fortis FC (8 May)
- Longest winning run: 8 matches Dhaka Abahani
- Longest unbeaten run: 13 matches Dhaka Abahani
- Longest winless run: 10 matches Fakirerpool
- Longest losing run: 8 matches Fakirerpool

The 2025–26 Bangladesh Football League, also known as the United Healthcare Bangladesh Football League for sponsorship reasons, was the 18th season of the country's top-tier Professional League since its establishment in 2007 and its first after being rebranded as the Bangladesh Football League.

Mohammedan SC were the defending champions, having won their 1st professional league title and 20th top-tier league title overall, ending a 23-year drought in 2024–25 season.

== Teams ==
=== Stadiums and locations ===
Locations of the 2025–26 Bangladesh Football League teams
Location of the Dhaka division football club tents and stadiums

2025–26 Bangladesh Football League clubs
Team	Location	Stadium	Capacity
Abahani Limited	Cumilla	Shaheed Dhirendranath Datta Stadium	18,000
Arambagh KS	Manikganj	Shaheed Miraj–Tapan Stadium	5,000
Bangladesh Police FC	Gazipur	Shaheed Barkat Stadium	5,000
Bashundhara Kings	Dhaka	Bashundhara Kings Arena	6,000
Brothers Union	Munshiganj	Munshiganj Stadium	10,000
Fakirerpool YMC	Manikganj	Shaheed Miraj–Tapan Stadium	5,000
Fortis FC	Dhaka	Bashundhara Kings Arena	6,000
Mohammedan SC	Cumilla	Shaheed Dhirendranath Datta Stadium	18,000
Rahmatganj MFS	Munshiganj	Munshiganj Stadium	10,000
PWD Sports Club	Gazipur	Shaheed Barkat Stadium	5,000

=== Promotion/Relegation ===
▲ Promoted from 2024–25 BCL	▼ Relegated from 2024–25 BPL
PWD Sports Club Arambagh KS	Chittagong Abahani Dhaka Wanderers

=== Personnel, kits, sponsors ===
Team	Head coach	Captain	Kit manufacturer	Shirt sponsor (chest)
Abahani Limited	(Bangladesh) Maruful Haque	(Bangladesh) Assaduzzaman Bablu		
Arambagh KS	(Bangladesh) Sheikh Zahidur Rahman Milon	(Bangladesh) Md Rokey		Sharif Metal
Bangladesh Police FC	(Bangladesh) S. M. Asifuzzaman	(Bangladesh) Manik Hossain Molla		
Bashundhara Kings	(Bangladesh) Bayazid Alam Zubair Nipu	(Bangladesh) Topu Barman		Bashundhara Group
Brothers Union	(Bangladesh) K.M. Zabid Hossain	(Bangladesh) Jamal Bhuyan	2WO Playwear	
Fakirerpool YMC	(Bangladesh) Sawpan Kumar Das	(Bangladesh) Raficul Islam		
Fortis FC	(Bangladesh) Masud Parvez Kaiser	(The Gambia) Pa Omar Babou	TORR	TORR Limited
Mohammedan SC	(Bangladesh) Alfaz Ahmed	(Bangladesh) Mehedi Hasan Mithu	Wings	
PWD Sports Club	(Bangladesh) Anawer Hossain	(Bangladesh) Sumon Kumar Das	Designex	
Rahmatganj MFS	(Bangladesh) Kamal Babu	(The Gambia) Solomon King Kanform		

=== Coaching changes ===
Team	Outgoing Coach	Manner of departure	Date of vacancy	Position in the table	Incoming Coach	Date of appointment
Brothers Union	(The Gambia) Omar Sisse	Demoted to assistant	September 2025	Pre-season	(Bangladesh) K.M. Zabid Hossain	September 2025
Bangladesh Police FC	(Germany) Frank Bernhardt	Mutual Consent	May 2025	Pre-season	(Bangladesh) S. M. Asifuzzaman	21 July 2025
Bashundhara Kings	(Romania) Valeriu Tița	Mutual Consent	28 June 2025	Pre-season	(Brazil) Sérgio Farias	28 July 2025
Bashundhara Kings	(Brazil) Sérgio Farias	Signed by Duhok SC	11 August 2025	Pre-season	(Argentina) Mario Gómez	25 August 2025
Bashundhara Kings	(Argentina) Mario Gómez	Departed due to a salary dispute.	January 2026	1st	(Bangladesh) Bayazid Alam Zubair Nipu	March 2026
Dhaka Mohammedan	(Bangladesh) Alfaz Ahmed	Sacked	12 April 2026	7th	(Bangladesh) Abdul Kayum Santu	12 April 2026

== Foreign players ==
Each team is allowed a maximum of five foreign players. A team could name four foreign players on the squad of each game. Also from this season, the footballers from South Asian Football Federation countries would count as local footballers.

Team	Player 1	Player 2	Player 3	Player 4	Player 5	Left Mid Season
Abahani Limited	(Brazil) Bruno Matos	(Mali) Souleymane Diabate	(Nigeria) Emeka Ogbugh			
Abahani Limited	SAFF Player 1	SAFF Player 2	SAFF Player 3	SAFF Player 4	SAFF Player 5	
Arambagh	(Ghana) Ben Quansah	(Ghana) Kwame Kizito	(Ghana) Shadrach Lantei-Mills			(India) Prosenjit Chakraborty (Lebanon) Haidar Awada (Nigeria) Yaya John Denapo
Arambagh	SAFF Player 1	SAFF Player 2	SAFF Player 3	SAFF Player 4	SAFF Player 5	(India) Prosenjit Chakraborty (Lebanon) Haidar Awada (Nigeria) Yaya John Denapo
Bangladesh Police	(Brazil) Danilo Quipapá	(Brazil) Paulo Henrique	(The Gambia) Foday Darboe	(Nigeria) Moses Odo	(Uganda) Shafiq Kagimu	(Nepal) Kiran Chemjong
Bangladesh Police	SAFF Player 1	SAFF Player 2	SAFF Player 3	SAFF Player 4	SAFF Player 5	(Nepal) Kiran Chemjong
Bangladesh Police	(Bhutan) Orgyen Tshering	(Bhutan) Sherub Dorji	(Nepal) Ayush Ghalan			(Nepal) Kiran Chemjong
Bashundhara Kings	(Brazil) Dorielton	(Nigeria) Emmanuel Tony Agbaji	(Nigeria) Sunday Emmanuel			(Brazil) Raphael Augusto
Bashundhara Kings	SAFF Player 1	SAFF Player 2	SAFF Player 3	SAFF Player 4	SAFF Player 5	(Brazil) Raphael Augusto
Brothers Union	(Guinea) Ibrahima Barry	(Guinea) Kerfala Kouyaté	(Guinea) Mamoudou Conde	(Nigeria) Samuel Chigozie Ononiwu	(Senegal) Mouhamed Becaye Diarra	(Brazil) Marcos Rudwere Silva (Ivory Coast) Didier Brossou (Nepal) Anjan Bista (Nepal) Arik Bista (Nepal) Sanish Shrestha (Nepal) Yogesh Gurung (Nigeria) Sunday Chizoba (Paraguay) Fernando Presentado
Brothers Union	SAFF Player 1	SAFF Player 2	SAFF Player 3	SAFF Player 4	SAFF Player 5	(Brazil) Marcos Rudwere Silva (Ivory Coast) Didier Brossou (Nepal) Anjan Bista (Nepal) Arik Bista (Nepal) Sanish Shrestha (Nepal) Yogesh Gurung (Nigeria) Sunday Chizoba (Paraguay) Fernando Presentado
Brothers Union	(Pakistan) Abdullah Shah	(Pakistan) Alamgir Ghazi	(Pakistan) Hayyaan Khattak	(Pakistan) Shayak Dost	(Pakistan) Umar Hayat	(Brazil) Marcos Rudwere Silva (Ivory Coast) Didier Brossou (Nepal) Anjan Bista (Nepal) Arik Bista (Nepal) Sanish Shrestha (Nepal) Yogesh Gurung (Nigeria) Sunday Chizoba (Paraguay) Fernando Presentado
Fakierepool	(Ivory Coast) Ouattara Ben Ibrahim	(Egypt) Mostafa Kahraba	(Guinea) Louis Lansana Beavogui	(Mali) Fofana Abu Mohamed		(India) Shubhajit Saha
Fakierepool	SAFF Player 1	SAFF Player 2	SAFF Player 3	SAFF Player 4	SAFF Player 5	(India) Shubhajit Saha
Fortis	(The Gambia) Essa Jallow	(The Gambia) Pa Omar Babou	(Nigeria) Onyekachi Okafor			
Fortis	SAFF Player 1	SAFF Player 2	SAFF Player 3	SAFF Player 4	SAFF Player 5	
Fortis	(Bhutan) Dawa Tshering	(Nepal) Ananta Tamang	(Sri Lanka) Sujan Perera			
Mohammedan	(Ghana) Bernard Morrison	(Ghana) Emmanuel Eli Keke	(Ghana) Samuel Boateng			(Uzbekistan) Muzaffar Muzaffarov
Mohammedan	SAFF Player 1	SAFF Player 2	SAFF Player 3	SAFF Player 4	SAFF Player 5	(Uzbekistan) Muzaffar Muzaffarov
PWD SC	(Brazil) Jonathan Santana	(Ghana) Kwadwo Acquah	(Ghana) Kofi Junior Dabanka	(Russia) Marat Devessa Tareck		(Ghana) Anthony Amoh (Uzbekistan) Akobir Turaev
PWD SC	SAFF Player 1	SAFF Player 2	SAFF Player 3	SAFF Player 4	SAFF Player 5	(Ghana) Anthony Amoh (Uzbekistan) Akobir Turaev
PWD SC	(Bhutan) Sangay Yoezer	(Pakistan) Ali Uzair	(Pakistan) Usman Ali			(Ghana) Anthony Amoh (Uzbekistan) Akobir Turaev
Rahmatganj	(The Gambia) Adama Jammeh	(The Gambia) Solomon King Kanform	(Ghana) Andrews Kwadwo Appau	(Ghana) Clement Adu	(Ghana) Ernest Boateng	
Rahmatganj	SAFF Player 1	SAFF Player 2	SAFF Player 3	SAFF Player 4	SAFF Player 5	
Rahmatganj	(Nepal) Abhishek Limbu					

=== Foreign players by confederation ===
Foreign players by confederation
AFC	India (2), Nepal (3), Lebanon (1), Sri Lanka (1), Bhutan (4); Pakistan (8)
CAF	Egypt (1), Gambia (5), Ghana (9), Ivory Coast (1), Mali (2), Nigeria (7), Uganda (1), Guinea (3)
CONCACAF	
CONMEBOL	Brazil (5)
OFC	
UEFA	Russia (1)

=== Dual citizenship/heritage players ===
Team	Player 1	Player 2	Player 3	Player 4	Player 5	Player 6
Abahani Limited	(Canada) (Bangladesh) Quazem Shah^{1} ^{3}					
Arambagh						
Bangladesh Police						
Bashundhara Kings						
Brothers Union	(Denmark) (Bangladesh) Jamal Bhuyan^{1} ^{3}	(Nigeria) (Bangladesh) Eleta Kingsley^{1}	(United States) (Bangladesh) Sanjay Karim ^{3}	(England) (Bangladesh) Kasper Haque ^{3}	(Sweden) (Bangladesh) Ashik Rahman ^{3}	(Sweden) (Bangladesh) Anik Rahman ^{3}
Fakirerpool	(Italy) (Bangladesh) Bishal Das ^{3}					
Fortis						
Mohammedan						
PWD SC						
Rahmatganj						

Notes:

^1 Capped for Bangladesh national team.
^2 Capped for Bangladesh national football team age groups (U-17, U-20, and U-23)
^3 Carrying Bangladesh heritage.

== League table ==
Pos	Team	Pld	W	D	L	GF	GA	GD	Pts	Qualification or relegation
1	Bashundhara Kings (Note: Bashundhara Kings and Dhaka Abahani will not be able to participate in the AFC Challenge League due to the risk of FIFA sanctions and the lack of an AFC club license.) (C)	18	12	5	1	42	18	+24	41	
2	Dhaka Abahani	18	11	4	3	37	15	+22	37	
3	Fortis	18	10	5	3	31	13	+18	35	Qualification for the AFC; Challenge League qualifying stage
4	Bangladesh Police	18	6	9	3	19	15	+4	27	Qualification for the AFC; Challenge League qualifying stage
5	Mohammedan	18	6	5	7	27	20	+7	23	
6	Rahmatganj	18	6	5	7	21	25	−4	23	
7	Brothers Union	18	4	5	9	18	29	−11	17	
8	PWD	18	4	5	9	15	28	−13	17	
9	Arambagh	18	3	5	10	12	28	−16	14	
10	Fakirerpool	18	2	4	12	13	44	−31	10	

Source: Soccerway
Rules for classification: 1) Points; 2) Goal difference; 3) Number of goals scored.
(C) Champion

== Results ==
=== Results table ===
Home \ Away	AKS	BPFC	BDK	BUL	DAL	FYMC	FFC	MSC	PWD	RMFS
Arambagh	—	0–3	0–2	2–0	0–4	1–1	0–1	0–2	0–1	1–0
Bangladesh Police	2–0	—	2–1	1–1	1–3	1–1	0–2	1–1	1–0	1–1
Bashundhara Kings	2–1	1–1	—	1–0	2–2	4–1	2–1	2–0	2–0	5–0
Brothers Union	2–2	0–1	1–5	—	1–2	2–0	1–1	0–0	1–2	3–1
Dhaka Abahani	3–0	2–0	0–2	1–2	—	2–0	1–0	2–1	2–2	4–1
Fakirerpool	1–1	1–3	3–3	0–2	0–5	—	1–7	2–0	0–1	0–2
Fortis	0–0	0–0	2–3	2–0	0–0	3–0	—	2–0	2–0	3–2
Mohammedan	1–1	1–1	1–2	5–0	3–2	3–0	1–2	—	4–0	1–1
PWD SC	0–3	0–0	2–2	0–0	0–2	1–2	2–2	1–3	—	2–0
Rahmatganj	3–0	0–0	1–1	3–2	0–0	3–0	0–1	1–0	2–1	—

Source: Soccerway
Legend: Blue = home team win; Yellow = draw; Red = away team win.
For upcoming matches, an "a" indicates there is an article about the rivalry between the two participants.

=== Form ===
Team ╲ Round	1	2	3	4	5	6	7	8	9	10	11	12	13	14	15	16	17	18
Arambagh	D	L	L	L	L	W	D	L	L	D	W	L	D	W	D	L	L	L
Bangladesh Police	W	D	D	L	D	D	W	W	D	D	D	L	L	W	W	D	W	D
Bashundhara Kings	D	W	W	W	W	W	L	D	D	W	W	W	D	W	W	D	W	W
Brothers Union	L	W	W	D	L	L	L	D	D	D	L	W	L	L	D	W	L	L
Dhaka Abahani	D	L	L	W	D	W	D	D	W	W	W	W	W	W	W	W	L	W
Fakirerpool	D	L	L	W	D	L	L	W	D	D	L	L	L	L	L	L	L	L
Fortis	W	L	D	W	D	W	W	D	W	W	L	W	D	L	W	W	W	D
Mohammedan	L	D	W	L	W	L	D	D	D	L	D	L	W	W	L	W	L	W
PWD SC	D	W	L	D	L	D	D	L	L	L	L	W	W	L	L	L	W	D
Rahmatganj	D	W	W	L	W	L	W	D	D	L	W	L	D	L	L	L	W	D

Source: Soccerway
W = Win; D = Draw; L = Lose

=== Positions by round ===
The following table lists the positions of teams after each week of matches. In order to preserve the chronological evolution, any postponed matches are not included to the round at which they were originally scheduled but added to the full round they were played immediately afterward.

Team ╲ Round	1	2	3	4	5	6	7	8	9	10	11	12	13	14	15	16	17	18
Arambagh	5	7	9	10	10	10	9	10	10	10	9	10	9	8	8	8	9	9
Bangladesh Police	2	4	4	6	6	6	4	4	4	4	5	5	5	4	4	4	4	4
Bashundhara Kings	3	2	1	1	1	1	1	1	1	1	1	1	1	1	1	1	1	1
Brothers Union	9	6	3	2	5	7	8	7	7	7	7	6	7	7	7	7	7	7
Dhaka Abahani	7	8	8	7	7	4	5	5	5	3	3	3	2	2	2	2	2	2
Fakirerpool	6	9	10	8	8	9	10	8	8	8	8	9	10	10	10	10	10	10
Fortis	1	5	5	3	3	2	2	2	2	2	2	2	3	3	3	3	3	3
Mohammedan	10	10	7	9	4	5	6	6	6	6	6	7	6	6	6	5	6	5
PWD SC	4	3	6	5	9	8	7	9	9	9	10	8	8	9	9	9	8	8
Rahmatganj	8	1	2	4	2	3	3	3	3	5	4	4	4	5	5	6	5	6

Leader
Runners-up

Source: Soccerway

== Season statistics ==
=== Goalscorers ===
There were 235 goals scored in 90 matches, for an average of 2.61 goals per match. Source: Soccerway

19 goals

- (Brazil) Dori (Bashundhara Kings)

13 goals

- (The Gambia) Pa Omar Babou (Fortis)

11 goals

- (Mali) Souleymane Diabate (Dhaka Abahani)

7 goals

- (Brazil) Paulo Henrique (Bangladesh Police)
- (Nigeria) Onyekachi Okafor (Fortis)
- (Pakistan) Shayak Dost (Brothers Union)
- (Uzbekistan) Muzaffar Muzaffarov (Mohammedan SC)

6 goals

- (Bangladesh) Foysal Ahmed Fahim (Bashundhara Kings)
- (Bangladesh) Shekh Morsalin (Dhaka Abahani)
- (The Gambia) Solomon King Kanform (Rahmatganj)
- (Nigeria) Emeka Ogbugh (Dhaka Abahani)
- (Nigeria) Sunday Emmanuel (Bashundhara Kings)

5 goals

- (Bangladesh) Sourav Dewan (Mohammedan SC)
- (Ghana) Kwame Kizito (Arambagh)
- (Ghana) Samuel Boateng (Mohammedan SC)

4 goals

- (Ivory Coast) Ouattara Ben Ibrahim (Fakirerpool)

3 goals

- (Bangladesh) Al-Amin (Dhaka Abahani )
- (Bangladesh) Rahim Uddin (Mohammedan SC)
- (Brazil) Bruno Matos (Dhaka Abahani)
- (Ghana) Clement Adu (Rahmatganj)
- (Ghana) Ernest Boateng (Rahmatganj)
- (Russia) Marat Tareck (PWD SC)
- (Uganda) Shafiq Kagimu (Bangladesh Police)

2 goals

- (Bangladesh) Abu Sayed (PWD SC)
- (Bangladesh) Hossain Mohammad Arian (Fakirerpool)
- (Bangladesh) Irfan Hossen (Fakirerpool)
- (Bangladesh) Jayed Ahmed (Rahmatganj)
- (Bangladesh) Jewel Mia (Mohammedan SC)
- (Bangladesh) Kazi Rahad Mia (Arambagh)
- (Bangladesh) Minhazul Karim Shadin (PWD SC)
- (Bangladesh) Mirajul Islam (Dhaka Abahani)
- M. S. Bablu (Bangladesh Police)
- (Bangladesh) Quazem Shah (Dhaka Abahani)
- Rabby Hossen Rahul (Bangladesh Police)
- (Bangladesh) Rafayel Tudu (Mohammedan SC)
- (Bangladesh) Rakib Hossain (Bashundhara Kings)
- (Bangladesh) Riaj Uddin Sagor (Fortis)
- (Bangladesh) Shahriar Emon (Bashundhara Kings)
- (Brazil) Marcos Rudwere (Brothers Union)
- (The Gambia) Essa Jallow (Fortis)
- (Nepal) Abhishek Limbu (Rahmatganj)
- (Nepal) Ananta Tamang (Fortis)
- (Nepal) Ayush Ghalan (Bangladesh Police)
- (Uzbekistan) Akobir Turaev (PWD SC)

1 goal

- (Bangladesh) Amir Hakim Bappy (Arambagh)
- Amirul Islam (Bangladesh Police)
- (Bangladesh) Arman Foysal Akash (PWD SC)
- (Bangladesh) Enamul Islam Gazi (Dhaka Abahani)
- Isa Faysal (Bangladesh Police)
- (Bangladesh) Joy Ahamed (Mohammedan SC)
- (Bangladesh) Md Shadin (Fakirerpool)
- (Bangladesh) Mehedi Hasan Mithu (Mohammedan SC)
- (Bangladesh) Mehedi Hasan Royal (Rahmatganj)
- (Bangladesh) Meraj Pradhan (Brothers Union)
- (Bangladesh) Mithu Chowdhury (Fortis)
- (Bangladesh) Mohammad Abdullah (PWD SC)
- (Bangladesh) Mohammad Ridoy (Bashundhara Kings)
- (Bangladesh) Mohsin Ahmed (Brothers Union)
- (Bangladesh) Mojammel Hossain Nira (Brothers Union)
- (Bangladesh) Mojibur Rahman Jony (Bashundhara Kings)
- (Bangladesh) Moltazim Alam Hemel (Brothers Union)
- (Bangladesh) Murshed Ali (Fortis)
- (Bangladesh) Nazmul Huda Faysal (PWD SC)
- (Bangladesh) Papon Singh (Dhaka Abahani)
- (Bangladesh) Piash Ahmed Nova (Fortis)
- (Bangladesh) Rafiqul Islam (Rahmatganj)
- (Bangladesh) Rajon Howladar (Rahmatganj)
- (Bangladesh) Rostam Islam Dukhu Mia (PWD SC)
- (Bangladesh) Sajed Hasan Jummon (Fortis)
- (Bangladesh) Sohel Rana Jr. (Bashundhara Kings)
- (Bangladesh) Sohel Rana Sr. (Bashundhara Kings)
- (Bangladesh) Sumon Islam (Fakirerpool)
- (Bangladesh) Tias Das (Fakirerpool)
- (Bangladesh) Topu Barman (Bashundhara Kings)
- (Brazil) Danilo Quipapá (Bangladesh Police)
- (Brazil) Raphael Augusto (Bashundhara Kings)
- (Ivory Coast) Didier Brossou (Brothers Union)
- (Egypt) Mostafa Kahraba (Fakirerpool)
- (The Gambia) Adama Jammeh (Rahmatganj)
- (Ghana) Andrews Appau (Rahmatganj)
- (Ghana) Ben Nash Quansah (Arambagh)
- (Ghana) Emmanuel Eli Keke (Mohammedan SC)
- (Ghana) Kwadwo Acquah (PWD SC)
- (Ghana) Shadrach Lantei-Mills (Arambagh)
- (Guinea) Louis Beavogui (Fakirerpool)
- (Nepal) Anjan Bista (Brothers Union)
- (Nepal) Arik Bista (Brothers Union)
- (Nepal) Sanish Shrestha (Brothers Union)
- (Nigeria) Yaya John Denapo (Arambagh)
- (Pakistan) Alamgir Ghazi (Brothers Union)

=== Own goals ===
† Bold Club indicates winner of the match.

Player	Club	Opponent	Result	Date	Ref
(Bangladesh) Ashikur Rahman	PWD SC	Arambagh KS	0–3	14 March 2026	
(Bangladesh) Rajon Howladar	Rahmatganj MFS	PWD SC	0–2	10 April 2026	
(Bangladesh) Mithu Chowdhury	Fortis	Dhaka Abahani	0–1	24 April 2026	
(Bangladesh) Santo Tudu	Fakirerpool YMC	Fortis	1–7	8 May 2026	
(Bangladesh) Nikson Chakma	Arambagh KS	Dhaka Abahani	0–4	23 May 2026	

=== Hat-tricks ===
† Bold Club indicates winner of the match.

Player	For	Against	Result	Home/Away	Date	Ref
(Ghana) Samuel Boateng	Mohammedan SC	PWD SC	4–0	Home	6 December 2025	
(Brazil) Dorielton	Bashundhara Kings	Fortis	2–3	Away	14 March 2026	
(The Gambia) Pa Omar Babou^{4}	Fortis	Fakirerpool YMC	1–7	Away	8 May 2026	

=== Most assists ===
As of 23 May 2026

Rank	Player	Team	Assists
1	(The Gambia) Solomon King Kanform	Rahmatganj MFS	8
1	(Bangladesh) Rakib Hossain	Bashundhara Kings	8
2	(The Gambia) Pa Omar Babou	Fortis	7
3	(Bangladesh) Foysal Ahmed Fahim	Bashundhara Kings	6
4	(Mali) Souleymane Diabate	Mohammedan SC	5

=== Clean sheets by goalkeepers ===
As of 23 May 2026

Rank	Player	Club	Matches	Cleansheets	Clean sheets %
1	(Sri Lanka) Sujan Perera	Fortis	18	10	56.00
2	(Bangladesh) Mitul Marma	Dhaka Abahani	17	8	47.00
3	(Bangladesh) Mohamed Sujon Hossain	Mohammedan SC	25	6	24.00
4	(Bangladesh) Anisur Rahman Zico	Bashundhara Kings	16	5	31.00
5	(Bangladesh) Ishaque Ali	Brothers Union	14	4	28.00

=== Teams with the most Clean Sheets ===
As of 23 May 2026

Rank	Clubs	Matches	Cleansheets	Clean sheets %
1	Fortis	18	10	56.00
2	Dhaka Abahani	18	9	50.00
3	Bangladesh Police	18	7	39.00%
4	Bashundhara Kings	18	6	33.00%
4	Rahmatganj MFS	18	6	33.00%

=== Teams total Goals Scored ===
As of 23 May 2026

Rank	Clubs	Matches	Goals Scored
1	Bashundhara Kings	18	42
2	Dhaka Abahani	18	37
3	Fortis FC	18	31
4	Mohammedan SC	18	27
5	Rahmatganj MFS	18	21

=== Teams total Goals Conceded ===
As of 23 May 2026

Rank	Clubs	Matches	Goals Conceded
1	Fakirerpool YMC	18	44
2	Brothers Union	18	29
3	Arambagh KS	18	28
3	PWD Sports Club	18	28
5	Rahmatganj MFS	18	25

=== Discipline ===
==== Players ====
As of 23 May 2026

- Most yellow cards: 6
- (Bangladesh) Saad Uddin (Bashundhara Kings)
- Most red cards: 1
  - (15 players)

=== Yellow cards statistics ===
- (yellow card) Yellow cards:

As of 23 May 2026

Rank	Club	Yellow cards
1	PWD SC	40
2	Rahmatganj MFS	38
3	Bashundhara Kings	36
4	Bangladesh Police	32
5	Fortis	30
6	Arambagh KS	29
7	Dhaka Abahani	28
8	Brothers Union	27
9	Mohammadan SC	26
10	Fakirerpool YMC	21
Total		307

=== Red card statistics ===
- (red card) Red cards:

As of 23 May 2026

Rank	Club	Red cards/Sent off
1	Bangladesh Police	3
2	Bashundhara Kings	2
2	Fortis	2
2	Mohammedan SC	2
2	Rahmatganj MFS	2
2	Dhaka Abahani	2
2	PWD SC	2
3	Fakirerpool YMC	1
Total		16

== See also ==
- 2025–26 BCL
- 2025–26 Federation Cup
- 2025–26 Super Cup
- 2025–26 Independence Cup
- 2025 Challenge Cup
