= 2026–27 PWD Sports Club season =

Club 2026–27 football season

PWD Sports Club
2026–27 season
- Owner: Public Works Department
- General Secretary: Moshiur Rahman Akondo
- Head coach: Md Anwar Hossain
- Stadium: Shaheed Barkat Stadium
- Bangladesh Football League: TBD
- Federation Cup: TBD
- Independence Cup: TBD
Home colours	Away colours

The 2026–27 season is the PWD Sports Club's 72nd season in existence and 2nd season in the Bangladesh Football League. It also marks the club's return to top-flight football following their relegation from the 1994 Dhaka Premier Division League. In addition to the domestic league, PWD Sports Club will participate in this season's Federation Cup and Independence Cup. The season covers the period from 1 June 2026 to May 2027.

== Current squad ==
As of 10 April 2026

Note: Flags indicate national team as defined under FIFA eligibility rules; some limited exceptions apply. Players may hold more than one non-FIFA nationality.

No.	Pos.	Nation	Player
1	GK	BAN	Md Sarwar Jahan
2	DF	BAN	Md Sazal Islam Kalin
3	DF	BAN	Md Rashedul Islam Rashed
4	DF	BAN	Sumon Kumar Das
5	DF	BAN	Ashikur Rahman
6	MF	BAN	Md Abdullah Tofel
7	MF	BAN	Md Rumon Hossain
8	MF	BAN	Md Sohanur Rahman Sohan
9	FW	BAN	Arman Foysal Akash
10	MF	BAN	Mohammad Abdullah
11	FW	BAN	Md Minhazul Karim Shadin
12	DF	BAN	Md Hasibul Islam Shanto
13	DF	BAN	Md Ratul
14	MF	BAN	Md Sharif
15	FW	BAN	Md Jamir Uddin
16	DF	BAN	Md Tanvir Rana
18	MF	BAN	Sohel Hassan Rana
19	DF	BHU	Sangay Yoezer

No.	Pos.	Nation	Player
20	MF	BAN	Md Mazharul Islam Sourav
21	FW	BAN	Md Abu Sayed
22	GK	BAN	Md Anik Ahamed
23	MF	BAN	Md Rakibul Islam
24	DF	BAN	Md Imran Khan
25	DF	BAN	Md Saimon
26	DF	BAN	Md Sabbir Hossen
27	DF	GHA	Kofi Junior Dabanka
28	GK	BAN	Md Rahul Hossain
30	GK	BAN	Md Tahsin Saheb
32	FW	UZB	Akobir Turaev
34	FW	BAN	Said Rakib Khan Evan
35	DF	BAN	Jayanto Lal
36	MF	BAN	Md Mahin Sheikh
37	MF	GHA	Anthony Amoh
44	DF	BAN	Md Rostom Islam Dukhu Mia
45	MF	BAN	Md Salahuddin
99	FW	RUS	Marat Devessa Tareck

== Transfer ==
=== In ===
Pos	Player	Previous club	Fee	Date	Source
DF	(Bangladesh) Sirajul Islam Rana	(Bangladesh) Brothers Union	Free agent	30 July 2026	
FW	(Cameroon) Yohan Mbida	(Venezuela) PB–Mendiola FC	Unattached	7 August 2026	
ST	(Bangladesh) Md Jubayer Ahmed	(Bangladesh) Rahmatganj MFS	Unattached	18 August 2026	
MF	(Ivory Coast) Bosse Adam Cedric Kore	(Turkey) Balıkesirspor	Unattached	23 August 2026	
MF	(Nepal) Janmejay Dhami	(Nepal) New Road Team	Unattached	21 August 2026	
DF	(Germany) Flodyn Baloki	(Kyrgyzstan) FC Bishkek City	Unattached	20 August 2026	

=== Out ===
Pos	Player	Moved to	Fee	Date	Source
FW	(Bangladesh) Md Minhazul Karim Shadin	(Bangladesh) Chattogram City FC	Free agent	25 July 2026	
DF	(Bangladesh) Md Rostam Islam Dukhu Mia	(Bangladesh) Chattogram City FC	Free agent	30 July 2026	
DF	(Brazil) Jonathan Ferreira Santana	(Bangladesh) Brothers Union	Free agent	4 September 2026	

== Overall ==
Win Draw Loss Fixtures

Competition	First match	Last match	Final Position
BFL	September 2026	April 2027	
Federation Cup	October 2026	April 2027	
Independence Cup	October 2026	April 2027	

=== Overview ===
Competition	Record							
Competition	Pld	W	D	L	GF	GA	GD	Win %
BFL	0	0	0	0	0	0	+0	—
Independence Cup	0	0	0	0	0	0	+0	—
Federation Cup	0	0	0	0	0	0	+0	—
Total	0	0	0	0	0	0	+0	—

Last updated: September 2026
Source: Competitions

=== Premier League ===
==== League table ====
Pos	Team	Pld	W	D	L	GF	GA	GD	Pts	Qualification or relegation
9	Fortis	0	0	0	0	0	0	0	0	
10	Fakirerpool	0	0	0	0	0	0	0	0	
11	Mohammedan	0	0	0	0	0	0	0	0	
12	PWD	0	0	0	0	0	0	0	0	Relegation for the Bangladesh Championship League
13	Rahmatganj	0	0	0	0	0	0	0	0	Relegation for the Bangladesh Championship League

Source: Soccerway
Rules for classification: 1) Points; 2) Goal difference; 3) Number of goals scored.

==== Results summary ====
Overall								Home						Away					
Pld	W	D	L	GF	GA	GD	Pts	W	D	L	GF	GA	GD	W	D	L	GF	GA	GD
0	0	0	0	0	0	0	0	0	0	0	0	0	0	0	0	0	0	0	0

Source: Soccerway

==== Results by round ====
Round	1	2	3	4	5	6	7	8	9	10	11	12	13	14	15	16	17	18
Ground																		
Result																		
Position																		

Source: Matches
A = Away; H = Home; W = Win; D = Draw; L = Loss; P = Postponed

==== Matches ====
2026	v
BST (UTC+6)

2026	v
BST (UTC+6)

2026	v
BST (UTC+6)

2026	v
BST (UTC+6)

2026	v
BST (UTC+6)

== Statistics ==
=== Goalscorers ===
As of September 2026

Rank	Player	Position	Total	BPL	Federation
1	TBC	TBC	0	0	0
Total			0	0	0
