= 2025–26 Mohammedan SC (Dhaka) season =

Mohammedan SC (Dhaka) 2025–26 football season

Mohammedan SC
2025–26 season
- President: Md Abdul Mubeen
- Head coach: Abdul Qaium Sentu (Interm)
- Stadium: Shaheed Dhirendranath Datta Stadium
- Bangladesh Football League: TBD
- Federation Cup: TBD
- Independence Cup: TBD
- Challenge Cup: Runners-up
Home colours	Away colours

The 2025–26 season is Mohammedan SC Dhaka's 90th season in existence and 18th consecutive season in Bangladesh Football League since its establishment in 2007. In addition to domestic league, Mohammedan will participate in the season's edition of the Challenge Cup, Federation Cup and Federation Cup. The season covered the period from 1 June 2025 to May 2026.

== Management ==
Position	Staff
Board of directors
President	(Bangladesh) Md Abdul Mubeen
Director in charge	(Bangladesh) Kazi Firoz Rashid
Chairman	Vacant
Technical Committee
Head	(Bangladesh) Imtiaz Sultan Johnny
Member	(Bangladesh) Hasanuzzaman Khan Bablu
Member	(Bangladesh) Rumman Bin Wali Sabbir
Member	(Bangladesh) Elias Hossain
Member	(Bangladesh) Jasimuddin Joshi
Member	(Bangladesh) Fazlur Rahman Babul
Coaching Staff
Head Coach	(Bangladesh) Alfaz Ahmed
Assistant Coach	(Bangladesh) Abdul Kayum Sentu
Goalkeeper Coach	(Bangladesh) Sayeed Hassan Kanan
Physiotherapist	(Bangladesh) Md Nurul Islam
Team Manager	(Bangladesh) Imtiaz Ahmed Nakib
Assistant manager	(Bangladesh) Sayed Mohammad Abdul Kabbar Siddique
Masseur	(Bangladesh) Md Ubadullah
Masseur	(Bangladesh) Md Arman Hosen
