= 2025–26 Federation Cup (Bangladesh) Group B =

Group B of the 2025–26 Federation Cup took place from 23 September 2025 to 17 February 2026. The group consisted defending champions of previous tournaments Bashundhara Kings, Arambagh KS, Bangladesh Police, Fortis FC and Mohammedan SC.

== Teams ==
Draw position	Team	Appearances	Previous best performance
B1	Arambagh KS	32nd	Runners-up (1997, 2001)
B2	Bangladesh Police	6th	Semi-finals (2019–20, 2023–24)
B3	Bashundhara Kings	6th	Champions (2019–20, 2020–21, 2023–24)
B4	Fortis FC	3rd	Group stages (2022–23)
B5	Mohammedan SC	36th	Champions (1980, 1981, 1982, 1983, 1987, 1989, 1995, 2002, 2008, 2009, 2022–23)

== Standings ==
Pos	Team	Pld	W	D	L	GF	GA	GD	Pts	Qualification
1	Bashundhara Kings	4	2	2	0	10	2	+8	8	Qualified for QRF 1
2	Mohammedan SC	4	2	2	0	8	3	+5	8	Advanced to QRF 2
3	Bangladesh Police	4	2	0	2	6	8	−2	6	
4	Fortis FC	4	1	2	1	7	4	+3	5	
5	Arambagh KS	4	0	0	4	0	14	−14	0	

Source: Sofascore
Rules for classification: Group stages tiebreakers

== Venues ==
The matches are being played at these two venues across the country.

Cumilla	Dhaka
Shaheed Dhirendranath Datta Stadium	Bashundhara Kings Arena
Capacity: 18,000	Capacity: 6,000
Matches:	Matches:
2025–26 Federation Cup (Bangladesh) Group B is located in Bangladesh

== Matches ==
23 September 2025
14:45

Bangladesh Police	2–3	Mohammedan SC
I. Faysal 9'; D. Quipapá 30'	Report	S. Boateng 11', 47', 73'

Shaheed Dhirendranath Datta Stadium, Cumilla
Referee: Md Anisur Rahman Sagor
23 September 2025
14:45

Bashundhara Kings	1–1	Fortis FC
Dorielton 49'	Report	T. Kazi 85' (o.g.)

Bashundhara Kings Arena, Dhaka
Referee: Md Nasir Uddin

2 December 2025
14:30

Fortis FC	1–1	Mohammedan SC
O. Okafor 28'	Report	S. Boateng 86'

Shaheed Dhirendranath Datta Stadium, Cumilla
Referee: Md Jalal Uddin
2 December 2025
14:30

Arambagh KS	0–1	Bangladesh Police
	Report	P. Henrique 79'

Bashundhara Kings Arena, Dhaka
Referee: Bhubon Mohon Tarafder

16 December 2025
14:30

Arambagh KS	0–4	Fortis FC
	Report	Sajed Hasan Jummon Nijum 26'; P. Babou 33' (pen.); O. Okafor 68'; Md Murshed Ali 75'

Bashundhara Kings Arena, Dhaka
Referee: Md Nasir Uddin
23 December 2025
14:30

Bashundhara Kings	0–0	Mohammedan SC
	Report

Shaheed Dhirendranath Datta Stadium, Cumilla
Referee: Md Nasir Uddin

7 April 2026
14:45

Arambagh KS	0–5	Bashundhara Kings
	Report	Dorielton 16', 55'; F. Fahim 23'; S. Emmanuel 32'; S. Rana 67'

Shaheed Dhirendranath Datta Stadium, Cumilla
Referee: Md Jalal Uddin
7 April 2026
14:45

Bangladesh Police	2–1	Fortis FC
S. Kagimu 66'; M. Rahul 79'	Report	O. Okafor 37'

Bashundhara Kings Arena, Dhaka
Referee: Md Symoon Hasan Sany

21 April 2026
14:45

Bangladesh Police	1–4	Bashundhara Kings
M. Bablu 90+2'	Report	Dorielton 45+8', 52', 83', 88'

Bashundhara Kings Arena, Dhaka
Referee: Mahmud Zamal Faruqee Nahid
21 April 2026
14:45

Mohammedan SC	4–0	Arambagh KS
Md Jewel Mia 36'; Sourav Dewan 76', 83', 89'	Report

Shaheed Dhirendranath Datta Stadium, Cumilla
Referee: SM Jashim Akhter

== See also ==
- 2025–26 Federation Cup Group A
- 2025–26 Bangladeshi football
