= 2025–26 Federation Cup (Bangladesh) =

37th season of the Bangladesh Federation Cup

২০২৫–২৬ ফেডারেশন কাপ

Tournament details
- Host country: Bangladesh
- Dates: 23 September 2025– 20 May 2026
- Teams: 10
- Venue: 2 (in 2 host cities)

Final positions
- Champions: Bashundhara Kings (5th title)
- Runners-up: Mohammedan SC
- Third place: Brothers Union
- Fourth place: Rahmatganj MFS

Tournament statistics
- Matches played: 24
- Goals scored: 64 (2.67 per match)
- Top scorer(s): Dorielton (Bashundhara Kings) (12 goals)
- Best player(s): Dorielton (Bashundhara Kings)
- Fair play award: Bashundhara Kings

The 2025–26 Federation Cup was the 37th edition of the tournament, the main domestic annual top-tier club football competition in Bangladesh organized by Bangladesh Football Federation (BFF). Ten participants were contested in the tournament. It's was played from 23 September 2025 to 20 May 2026.

Bashundhara Kings is the current champions having defeated Mohammedan SC by 3–2 goals in the final on 20 May 2026.

== Participating teams ==
The following ten clubs were participated in the tournament.

Team	Appearances	Previous best performance
Arambagh KS	32nd	Runners-up (1997, 2001)
Bangladesh Police	6th	Semi-finals (2019–20, 2023–24)
Bashundhara Kings	6th	Champions (2019–20, 2020–21, 2023–24)
Brothers Union	34th	Champions (1980, 1991, 2005)
Dhaka Abahani	36th	Champions (1982, 1985, 1986, 1988, 1997, 1999, 2000, 2010, 2016, 2017, 2018, 2021–22)
Mohammedan	36th	Champions (1980, 1981, 1982, 1983, 1987, 1989, 1995, 2002, 2008, 2009, 2022–23)
Fortis FC	3rd	Group stages (2022–23)
Rahmatganj MFS	36th	Runners-up (2019–20, 2021–22)
Fakirerpool YMC	2nd	Group stages (2024–25)
PWD Sports Club	—N/a	—N/a

== Venues ==
The matches were played at these two venues across the country.

Cumilla	Dhaka
Cumilla Stadium (BSSDD Stadium)	Kings Arena
Capacity: 18,000	Capacity: 6,000
2025–26 Federation Cup (Bangladesh) is located in Bangladesh

== Draw ==
The draw ceremony of the tournament was held on 13 September 2025 15:00 BST at 3rd floor of BFF house Motijheel, Dhaka, Bangladesh. The ten clubs were divided into two groups, top two group winners & runners-up form each group will qualify in the next round.

== Group summary ==
Group A	Group B
Dhaka Abahani	Mohammedan SC
Rahmatganj MFS	Bashundhara Kings
Brothers Union	Fortis FC
Fakirerpool YMC	Bangladesh Police
PWD Sports Club	Arambagh Krira Sangha

== Round Matches Dates ==
Phase	Date
Group stages	23 September 2025 – 28 April 2026
QRF	5 May– 12 May 2026
Final	20 May 2026

== Match officials ==
The following officials were chosen for the competition by BFF tournament committee.

Referees

- (Bangladesh) Md Anisur Rahman Sagor
- (Bangladesh) Md Nasir Uddin
- (Bangladesh) SM Jashim Akhter
- (Bangladesh) Md Saymoon Hasan Sany
- (Bangladesh) Md Jalal Uddin
- (Bangladesh) Bhubon Mohon Tarafder
- (Bangladesh) Mahmud Zamal Faruqee Nahid
- (Bangladesh) SM Junayed Sharif

Assistant Referees

- (Bangladesh) Bikash Sarker
- (Bangladesh) Md Shah Alam
- (Bangladesh) Md Rasel Mahmud Jibon
- (Bangladesh) Sheikh Iqbal Alam
- (Bangladesh) Md Rubin Khan
- (Bangladesh) Md Nafiz Uddin
- (Bangladesh) Md Nuruzzaman
- (Bangladesh) Md Kamruzzaman
- (Bangladesh) Md Shohrab Hossain
- (Bangladesh) Md Tariqul Islam
- (Bangladesh) Md Manir Dhali
- (Bangladesh) Ms Mahmud Hasan Mamun

Match Commissioners

- (Bangladesh) Abdul Hannan Miron
- (Bangladesh) Bharot Chandra Gour
- (Bangladesh) Md Mizanur Rahman
- (Bangladesh) Md Ferrous Ahmed
- (Bangladesh) Md Amanat Ali Haldar
- (Bangladesh) Md Monirul Islam
- (Bangladesh) Md Golam Mostafa
- (Bangladesh) Sabbir Saleque Shuvo
- (Bangladesh) Md Tayeb Hasan

== Group stages ==
Key to colours in group tables
Group winners will qualify for QRF 1.
Group runners-ups will advance to QRF 2.

Tiebreakers
The ranking of teams in the group stage was determined as follows:
1. Points obtained in all group matches:
  - Win: 3 points;
  - Draw: 1 point;
  - Loss: 0 points;
2. Head to head result.
3. Goal difference in all group matches;
4. Number of goals scored in all group matches.

=== Group A ===
Pos	Team	Pld	W	D	L	GF	GA	GD	Pts	Qualification
1	Brothers Union	4	3	1	0	5	0	+5	10	Qualified for QRF 1
2	Rahmatganj	4	1	3	0	3	1	+2	6	Advanced to QRF 2
3	PWD SC	4	2	0	2	3	5	−2	6	
4	Dhaka Abahani	4	1	1	2	5	5	0	4	
5	Fakirerpool	4	0	1	3	2	7	−5	1	

Source: Sofascore
24 October 2025
14:45

Dhaka Abahani	4–2	Fakirerpool YMC
Diabate 6', 40' (pen.); Morsalin 35', 63'	Report	Shanto Tudu 51'; Mohammad Riyad 69'

Bashundhara Kings Arena, Dhaka
Referee: SM Jashim Akhter
24 October 2025
14:45

Brothers Union	0–0	Rahmatganj MFS
	Report

Shaheed Dhirendranath Datta Stadium, Cumilla
Referee: Md Saymoon Hasan Sany

9 December 2025
14:30

Dhaka Abahani	0–1	Brothers Union
	Report	Monir Alam 17'

Shaheed Dhirendranath Datta Stadium, Cumilla
Referee: Md Saymoon Hasan Sany
9 December 2025
14:30

Fakirerpool YMC	0–2	PWD Sports Club
	Report	A. Turaev 37' (pen.); Mohammed Sharif 65'

Bashundhara Kings Arena, Dhaka
Referee: SM Jashim Akhter

10 March 2026
14:45

Brothers Union	3–0	PWD Sports Club
S. Dost 12'; Kerfala Kouyaté 90+4'; Insan Hossen 90+4'	Report

Bashundhara Kings Arena, Dhaka
Referee: SM Junayed Sharif
10 March 2026
14:45

Rahmatganj MFS	1–1	Dhaka Abahani
E.Boateng 9'	Report	S. Morsalin 45+5' (pen.)

Shaheed Dhirendranath Datta Stadium, Cumilla
Referee: Mahmud Zamal Faruqee Nahid

14 April 2026
14:45

PWD Sports Club	0–2	Rahmatganj MFS
	Report	E. Boateng 51'; J. Ahmed 72'

Bashundhara Kings Arena, Dhaka
Referee: Md Nasrir Uddin
14 April 2026
14:45

Fakirerpool YMC	0–1	Brothers Union
	Report	H. Khattak 71'

Shaheed Dhirendranath Datta Stadium, Cumilla
Referee: Md Anisur Rahman

28 April 2026
14:45

Fakirerpool YMC	0–0	Rahmatganj MFS
	Report

Shaheed Dhirendranath Datta Stadium, Cumilla
Referee: Md Symoon Hasan Sany
28 April 2026
14:45

Dhaka Abahani	0–1	PWD Sports Club
	Report	M. Abdullah 66'

Bashundhara Kings Arena, Dhaka
Referee: Md Nasir Uddin

=== Group B ===
Pos	Team	Pld	W	D	L	GF	GA	GD	Pts	Qualification
1	Bashundhara Kings	4	2	2	0	10	2	+8	8	Qualified for QRF 1
2	Mohammedan SC	4	2	2	0	8	3	+5	8	Advanced to QRF 2
3	Bangladesh Police	4	2	0	2	6	8	−2	6	
4	Fortis FC	4	1	2	1	7	4	+3	5	
5	Arambagh KS	4	0	0	4	0	14	−14	0	

Source: Sofascore
23 September 2025
14:45

Bangladesh Police	2–3	Mohammedan SC
I. Faysal 9'; D. Quipapá 30'	Report	S. Boateng 11', 47', 73'

Shaheed Dhirendranath Datta Stadium, Cumilla
Referee: Md Anisur Rahman Sagor
23 September 2025
14:45

Bashundhara Kings	1–1	Fortis FC
Dorielton 49'	Report	T. Kazi 85' (o.g.)

Bashundhara Kings Arena, Dhaka
Referee: Md Nasir Uddin

2 December 2025
14:30

Fortis FC	1–1	Mohammedan SC
O. Okafor 28'	Report	S. Boateng 86'

Shaheed Dhirendranath Datta Stadium, Cumilla
Referee: Md Jalal Uddin
2 December 2025
14:30

Arambagh KS	0–1	Bangladesh Police
	Report	P. Henrique 79'

Bashundhara Kings Arena, Dhaka
Referee: Bhubon Mohon Tarafder

16 December 2025
14:30

Arambagh KS	0–4	Fortis FC
	Report	Sajed Hasan Jummon Nijum 26'; P. Babou 33' (pen.); O. Okafor 68'; Md Murshed Ali 75'

Bashundhara Kings Arena, Dhaka
Referee: Md Nasir Uddin
23 December 2025
14:30

Bashundhara Kings	0–0	Mohammedan SC
	Report

Shaheed Dhirendranath Datta Stadium, Cumilla
Referee: Md Nasir Uddin

7 April 2026
14:45

Arambagh KS	0–5	Bashundhara Kings
	Report	Dorielton 16', 55'; F. Fahim 23'; S. Emmanuel 32'; S. Rana 67'

Shaheed Dhirendranath Datta Stadium, Cumilla
Referee: Md Jalal Uddin
7 April 2026
14:45

Bangladesh Police	2–1	Fortis FC
S. Kagimu 66'; M. Rahul 79'	Report	O. Okafor 37'

Bashundhara Kings Arena, Dhaka
Referee: Md Symoon Hasan Sany

21 April 2026
14:45

Bangladesh Police	1–4	Bashundhara Kings
M. Bablu 90+2'	Report	Dorielton 45+8', 52', 83', 88'

Bashundhara Kings Arena, Dhaka
Referee: Mahmud Zamal Faruqee Nahid
21 April 2026
14:45

Mohammedan SC	4–0	Arambagh KS
Md Jewel Mia 36'; Sourav Dewan 76', 83', 89'	Report

Shaheed Dhirendranath Datta Stadium, Cumilla
Referee: SM Jashim Akhter

== Qualification Round (QR) to the Final ==
=== Round dates and venues ===
Round	Date	Venues
QRF 1	5 May 2026	Bashundhara Kings Arena
QRF 2	5 May 2026	Shaheed Dhirendranath Datta Stadium
QRF 3	12 May 2026	Shaheed Dhirendranath Datta Stadium
Final	20 May 2026	Bashundhara Kings Arena

=== Format ===
There is no home-away matches in this cup competition. So, every Qualification Round (QR) to the Final matches and Final will be played in neutral vanues.

QRF 1 winners will be advanced to the Final and losers will get a second chance by faceing QRF 2 winners in QRF 3.

The winners of QRF 3 will face QRF 1 winners in the Final.

=== Qualified teams ===
Group	Winners	Runners-up
A	Brothers Union	Rahmatganj MFS
B	Bashundhara Kings	Mohammedan SC

=== Bracket ===
QRF 1
Brothers Union	0
Bashundhara Kings	4
QRF 2
Rahmatganj MFS	0
Mohammedan SC	3

QRF 3
Brothers Union	1
Mohammedan SC	2

Final
Bashundhara Kings	3
Mohammedan SC	2

=== Qualification Round (QR) to the Final 1 ===
5 May 2026
14:45

Brothers Union	0–4	Bashundhara Kings
	Report	R. Hossain 3'; Dori 71', 73'; Md Sabbir Hossen 88'

Bashundhara Kings Arena, Dhaka
Referee: Md Symoon Hasan Sany

=== Qualification Round (QR) to the Final 2 ===
5 May 2026
14:45

Rahmatganj MFS	0–3	Mohammedan SC
	Report	Md Jewel Mia 29', 53'; Sourav Dewan 77'

Shaheed Dhirendranath Datta Stadium, Cumilla
Referee: Md Anisur Rahman

=== Qualification Round (QR) to the Final 3 ===
12 May 2026
14:45

Brothers Union	1–2	Mohammedan SC
J. Bhuyan 73'	Report	Sourav Dewan 38', 90+2'

Shaheed Dhirendranath Datta Stadium, Cumilla
Referee: Md Alamgir Sarker

== Final ==
20 May 2026
17:40

Bashundhara Kings	3–2	Mohammedan SC
Dorielton 9' (pen.), 49', 79'	Report	M. Muzaffarov 5'; Sourav Dewan 34'

Bashundhara Kings Arena, Dhaka
Referee: Mahmud Zamal Faruqee Nahid

== Statistics ==
=== Goalscorers ===
There have been 64 goals scored in 24 matches, for an average of 2.67 goals per match.

12 goals

- (Brazil) Dorielton (Bashundhara Kings)

7 goals

- (Bangladesh) Sourav Dewan (Mohammedan SC)

4 goals

- (Ghana) Samuel Boateng (Mohammedan SC)

3 goals

- (Nigeria) Onyekachi Okafor (Fortis FC)

2 goals

- (Mali) Souleymane Diabate (Dhaka Abahani)
- (Bangladesh) Shekh Morsalin (Dhaka Abahani)
- (Ghana) Ernest Boateng (Rahmatganj MFS)

1 goal

- (Bangladesh) Rakib Hossain (Bashundhara Kings)
- (Bangladesh) Md Sabbir Hossain (Bashundhara Kings)
- (Bangladesh) Insan Hossen (Brothers Union)
- (Bangladesh) Jamal Bhuyan (Brothers Union)
- (Pakistan) Shayak Dost (Brothers Union)
- (Pakistan) Hayyaan Khattak (Brothers Union)
- (Guinea) Kerfala Kouyaté (Brothers Union)
- Isa Faysal (Bangladesh Police)
- (Brazil) Danilo Quipapá (Bangladesh Police)
- M. S. Bablu (Bangladesh Police)
- (Brazil) Paulo Henrique (Bangladesh Police)
- (Uganda) Shafiq Kagimu (Bangladesh Police)
- (Bangladesh) Md Jewel Mia (Mohammedan SC)
- Rabby Hossen Rahul (Bangladesh Police)
- (Nigeria) Sunday Emmanuel (Bashundhara Kings)
- (Bangladesh) Foysal Ahmed Fahim (Bashundhara Kings)
- (Bangladesh) Sohel Rana (Bashundhara Kings)
- (Bangladesh) Monir Alam (Dhaka Abahani)
- (Bangladesh) Shekh Morsalin (Dhaka Abahani)
- (Bangladesh) Murshed Ali (Fortis FC)
- (Bangladesh) Sajed Hasan Jummon Nijum (Fortis FC)
- (The Gambia) Pa Omar Babou (Fortis FC)
- (Bangladesh) Shanto Tudu (Fakirerpool YMC)
- (Bangladesh) Mohammad Riyad (Fakirerpool YMC)
- (Uzbekistan) Muzaffar Muzaffarov (Mohammedan SC)
- (Bangladesh) Jayed Ahmed (Rahmatganj MFS)
- (Bangladesh) Mohammad Sharif (PWD SC)
- (Bangladesh) Mohammad Abdullah (PWD SC)
- (Uzbekistan) Akobir Turaev (PWD SC)

Source: Sofascore

Own goals

† Bold Club indicates winner of the match

Player	Club	Opponent	Result	Date
(Bangladesh) Tariq Kazi	Bashundhara Kings	Bashundhara Kings	1–1	23 September 2025

=== Hat-tricks ===
† Bold Club indicates winner of the match

Player	For	Against	Result	Date	Ref
(Ghana) Samuel Boateng	Mohammedan SC	Bangladesh Police	3–2	23 September 2025	
(Brazil) Dorielton^{4}	Bashundhara Kings	Bangladesh Police	4–1	21 April 2026	
(Bangladesh) Sourav Dewan	Mohammedan SC	Arambagh KS	4–0	21 April 2026	
(Brazil) Dorielton (2)	Bashundhara Kings	Mohammedan SC	3–2	20 May 2026	

== Broadcasting ==
Territory	Broadcaster(s)	Reference
No restricted territory	T Sports; T Sports YouTube^{(YouTube channel)}	Federation Cup playlist on YouTube
