= 2026 Bangladesh Challenge Cup =

- Event: Bangladesh Challenge Cup
Bashundhara Kings	Dhaka Abahani
- Cancelled
- Date: 21 August 2026
- Venue: Bashundhara Kings Arena, Dhaka

The 2026 Bangladesh Challenge Cup is the 3rd edition of the Bangladesh Challenge Cup. It is an annual football match contested by the champions of the previous season's Bangladesh Football League and Federation Cup competitions. Bashundhara Kings crowned the champions of 2025–26 Bangladesh Football League, 2025–26 Federation Cup and Dhaka Abahani qualified as 2025–26 Bangladesh Football League Runners-up.

Bashundhara Kings is the current edition champions of the cup who beat Mohammedan SC by 4–1 goals on 19 September 2025.

== Venue ==
The match of the cup will be played in the following venue.

Dhaka	Dhaka is located in Bangladesh
Bashundhara Kings Arena	Dhaka is located in Bangladesh
Capacity: 6,000	Dhaka is located in Bangladesh

== Teams ==
The following two teams qualified for the tournament.

Team	Qualification	App. (last)	Previous best result
Bashundhara Kings	2025–26 Bangladesh Football League Champions and 2025–26 Federation Cup Winners	3rd (2024, 2025)	Champions
Dhaka Abahani	2025–26 Bangladesh Football League Runners-up	1st (Debut)	None

== Match officials ==
The following officials were chosen for the cup by BFF tournament committee.

Referee

- (Bangladesh)

Assistant Referees

- (Bangladesh)
- (Bangladesh)

Referee Assosors

- (Bangladesh)

Match Commissioners

- (Bangladesh)

== Match ==
=== Details ===
21 August 2026
14:30 BST (UTC+6)

Bashundhara Kings	Cancelled	Dhaka Abahani

Bashundhara Kings Arena, Dhaka

=== Goalscorers ===
There have been 0 goals scored in 0 matches, for an average of -nan goals per match (as of 21 August 2026).
