= Solomon King Kanform =

Gambian footballer

Solomon King
Personal information
- Full name: Solomon King Kanform
- Date of birth: 18 May 1998 (age 28)
- Place of birth: Banjul, The Gambia
- Height: 1.75 m (5 ft 9 in)
- Positions: Attacking midfielder; striker

Team information
- Current team: City Club
- Number: 10

Senior career*
Years	Team	Apps	(Gls)
2017–2022	Sheikh Jamal DC	88	(45)
2023–2024	Bregalnica	22	(2)
2024–2025	Digenis Morphou	6	(0)
2025–2026	Rahmatganj MFS	25	(7)
2026–	City Club	0	(0)
- * Club domestic league appearances and goals as of 25 June 2026

Solomon King Kanform (born 18 May 1998) is a Gambian professional footballer who plays as a midfielder and captains Bangladesh Football League team City Club.

== Club career ==
=== Early career ===
Solomon King served as captain of Falcons and Gambia Armed Forces during his time in the GFA League First Division.

=== Sheikh Jamal DC ===
In 2017, Solomon King joined Sheikh Jamal DC in the Bangladesh Football League. On 8 August 2017, he scored his first league goal in a 2–1 victory over Sheikh Russel KC. On 26 August, he scored in a 2–1 victory over Muktijoddha Sangsad KC, leaving him with three goals in the last four matches. In the following league match on 6 September, King scored a brace against Brothers Union to take his team to the top of the table. Nevertheless, the Dhanmondi-based club finished runners-up in the 2017–18 league, with King scoring 15 goals, joint-top scorer alongside teammate, Raphael Odovin Onwrebe.

King captained the team in the 2018–19 league. On 28 January 2019, King scored his first league goal of the season in a 2–2 draw against Rahmatganj MFS. On 16 May, King scored in a 1–1 draw against Muktijoddha Sangsad, continuing the club's eight game winless run. In the following game on 22 May, King scored a brace as Sheikh Jamal ended their winless run with a 4–0 victory over Rahmatganj. Sheikh Jamal finished the season in sixth place, with King scoring 9 goals in 22 matches.

In the 2020–21 season, club captain, King scored 10 goals in 22 games. On 27 August 2021, King scored a brace in the final league match which ended in a 2–0 victory over Mohammedan SC, securing Sheikh Jamal a runners-up finish. This also secured the club a place in the 2022 AFC Cup qualifying stage, were the club were unable to participate after failing to obtain an AFC license.

Ahead of the 2021–22 season, Solomon extended his contract with the club for one more year, and also informed the club president about his desire to leave the club at the end of the 2021–22 league. He began the season with a goal in a 3–0 victory against Bangladesh Air Force in the 2021 Independence Cup on 27 November 2021. On 29 April 2022, King scored his final goal for the club in a 2–1 victory against Muktijoddha Sangsad in the league. He ended the season with 8 goals in 18 league appearances.

=== FK Bregalnica Štip ===
On 1 September 2023, King signed for Bregalnica in the Macedonian First Football League. On 3 October 2024, he scored his first league goal in a 1–2 defeat against GFK Tikvesh. He finished the 2023–24 league season with 22 appearances and 2 goals as his team suffered relegation.

=== Digenis Akritas Morphou ===
On 7 December 2024, King joined Digenis Akritas Morphou in the Cypriot Second Division. He made six appearances with only one as a starting player in the 2024–25 league season.

=== Rahmatganj MFS ===
On 26 February 2025, King returned to the Bangladesh Football League, joining Rahmatganj MFS in the mid-season transfer window of the 2024–25 season.

== Personal life ==
King was born into a Catholic Christian family in Banjul, Gambia. He converted to Islam during his time in Bangladesh.
