= Sardor Jakhonov =

Uzbek footballer (born 1996)

Personal information
- Date of birth: 28 June 1996 (age 30)
- Place of birth: Uzbekistan
- Height: 1.75 m (5 ft 9 in)
- Position: Midfielder

Team information
- Current team: RTC FC

Youth career
- Qizilqum Zarafshon U21

Senior career*
Years	Team	Apps	(Gls)
2019	Qizilqum Zarafshon	5	(0)
2020	Oqtepa	10	(1)
2021	Xorazm Urganch	9	(0)
2021	Kaganat	12	(2)
2022	Rajasthan United	14	(3)
2022	NEROCA	7	(0)
2023–2024	Regar-TadAZ	4	(0)
2024	TRAU	11	(1)
2024–2025	Fakirerpool YMC	9	(3)
2025	Abu Muslim		
2026—	Royal Thimphu College		
- * Club domestic league appearances and goals

Sardor Jakhonov (Russian: Сардор Жахонов; born 28 June 1996) is an Uzbek professional footballer who plays as a midfielder for Royal Thimphu College. He can slot in as an attacking or a defensive midfielder.

== Career ==
=== Earlier career ===
Jakhonov began his football career with Uzbekistan Super League side Quizilqum Zarafshon in 2019. After that stint, he joined the 2nd division side Oqtepa, but due to lack of game time there, he moved on to the Xorazm Urganch in 2021. He later moved to Kyrgyzstan and joined Premier League club FK Kaganat, where he made 12 appearances there scoring 2 goals.

=== Rajasthan United ===
On 1 February 2022, Jakhonov joined Rajasthan United in the final hours of deadline day as a free agent. He will be the AFC–quota Asian player at the club.

On 21 March 2022, he made his debut for the club against Churchill Brothers, in a 2–0 win. He scored his first goal for the club, on 29 March 2022, against Gokulam Kerala in a 1–1 draw, through the penalty spot.

=== Fakirerpool YMC ===
In August 2024, Jakhonov joined newly promoted Bangladesh Premier League club Fakirerpool Young Men's Club.

== Career statistics ==
As of 19 April 2023

Appearances and goals by club, season and competition
Club	Season	League			Cup		Continental		Total	
Club	Season	Division	Apps	Goals	Apps	Goals	Apps	Goals	Apps	Goals
Qizilqum Zarafshon	2019	Uzbekistan Super League	5	0	0	0	–		5	0
Oqtepa	2020	Uzbekistan Pro League	10	1	1 (Note: Appearance(s) in Uzbekistan Cup)	0	–		11	1
Xorazm Urganch	2021	Uzbekistan Pro League	9	0	3	0	–		12	0
Kaganat	2021	Kyrgyz Premier League	12	2	0	0	–		12	2
Rajasthan United	2021–22	I-League	14	3	0	0	–		14	3
NEROCA	2022–23	I-League	7	0	1 (Note: Appearance(s) in Durand Cup)	0	–		8	0
Churchill Brothers	2022–23	I-League	0	0	3 (Note: Appearance(s) in Super Cup)	1	–		3	1
Career total			57	6	8	1	0	0	65	7
