= Mamoud Oshie =

Ghanaian footballer

Personal information
- Full name: Mamoud Oshie
- Date of birth: 25 December 1998 (age 27)
- Place of birth: Accra, Ghana
- Height: 1.78 m (5 ft 10 in)
- Position: Midfielder

Team information
- Current team: Real Kashmir
- Number: 5

Senior career*
| Years | Team | Apps | (Gls) |
| – | King Faisal | | |
| – | Berekum Chelsea | | |
| – | New Edubiase United | | |
| 2019–2022 | Wassaman United | | |
| 2022 | Bibiani Gold Stars | 2 | (0) |
| 2022–2024 | Sahel SC | | |
| 2024–2025 | Rahmatganj MFS | 17 | (2) |
| 2026– | Real Kashmir | 2 | (0) |
- * Club domestic league appearances and goals as of 14 March 2026

Mamoud Oshie (born 25 December 1998) is a Ghanaian professional footballer who plays as a midfielder for Indian Football League club Real Kashmir.

== Club career ==
On 20 March 2021, Oshie joined Ghana's Division One League club Wassaman United.

On 30 August 2022, he joined Niger Premier League club Sahel SC.

On 19 August 2024, Oshie joined Bangladesh Premier League club Rahmatganj MFS. Oshie scored in his debut for Rahmatganj MFS in the club's first 2024–25 Bangladesh Premier League match against Fortis FC, which ended in a 3–1 victory.
