= Rajon Howladar =

Bangladeshi footballer (born 2003)

Personal information
- Full name: Md Rajon Howladar
- Date of birth: 1 December 2003 (age 22)
- Place of birth: Dhaka, Bangladesh
- Positions: Left-back; left wing-back

Team information
- Current team: City Club
- Number: 19

Youth career
- 2016: Sunrise

Senior career*
Years	Team	Apps	(Gls)
2017–2018	Muslim Institute		
2020–2021	Farashganj	20	(1)
2021–2022	Swadhinata	5	(0)
2022–2026	Rahmatganj	56	(3)
2026–	City Club	5	(0)

International career
2018–2019	Bangladesh U17	7	(1)
2022	Bangladesh U20	9	(1)
2025	Bangladesh U23	2	(0)
Medal record
Representing Bangladesh
SAFF U-17 Championship
Winner	2018 Nepal	Team
- * Club domestic league appearances and goals as of 24 October 2026

Md Rajon Howladar (Bengali: মোঃ রাজন হাওলাদার; born 1 December 2003) is a Bangladeshi professional footballer who plays as a left-back of left wing-back for Bangladesh Football League club City Club.

== Club career ==
On 10 December 2024, Rajon scored the winner for Rahmatganj MFS in a 1–0 victory over Mohammedan SC at the 2024–25 Federation Cup group-stages. He was also named the Man of the Match following the games conclusion.

== International career ==
Rajon was part of the Bangladesh U15 team that won the 2018 SAFF U-15 Championship in Lalitpur, Nepal. On 29 October 2018, he scored the winning goal in a 2–1 victory against the hosts in the group-stages. He also represented Bangladesh at the 2019 UEFA Assist U-15 Development Tournament held in Buriram, Thailand. In 2022, he represented the Bangladesh U20 team at both the 2022 SAFF U-20 Championship and 2023 AFC U-20 Asian Cup qualifiers. On 5 August 2022, he scored in the 45th minute during the SAFF U-20 Championship final to equalise for Bangladesh against India U20 in a match which they eventually lost 2–5.

== Career statistics ==
=== International goals ===
==== Youth ====
Scores and results list Bangladesh's goal tally first.

No.	Date	Venue	Opponent	Score	Result	Competition
1.	29 October 2018	ANFA Complex, Lalitpur, Nepal	Nepal	2–1	2–1	2018 SAFF U-15 Championship
2.	5 August 2022	Kalinga Stadium, Bhubaneswar, India	India	1–1	2–5	2022 SAFF U-20 Championship
Last updated 5 August 2024

== Honours ==
Bangladesh U-15

- SAFF U-17 Championship: 2018
