= Onyekachi Okafor =

Nigerian footballer

Personal information
- Full name: Onyekachi Okafor
- Date of birth: 2 June 1994 (age 32)
- Place of birth: Aba, Nigeria
- Height: 1.87 m (6 ft 2 in)
- Position: Forward

Team information
- Current team: City Club
- Number: 9

Youth career
- 2011–2013: Enyimba

Senior career*
Years	Team	Apps	(Gls)
2013–2014	Crown	21	(10)
2014–2015	Warri Wolves	23	(8)
2015–2016	Rivers United	24	(16)
2016–2017	Giresunspor	9	(0)
2017–2018	Yalova SK	13	(11)
2018–2019	Doğan Türk Birliği	36	(26)
2019–2020	Küçük Kaymaklı	18	(16)
2021–2023	Al-Salman SC		
2023–2024	Heartland	24	(6)
2024–2025	Rangers	7	(0)
2024–2025	Lobi Stars	15	(2)
2025–2026	Fortis	16	(7)
2026–	City Club	3	(4)

International career
2015	Nigeria	2	(0)
- * Club domestic league appearances and goals as of 20 October 2025

Onyekachi Okafor (born 2 June 1994, in Aba) is a Nigerian footballer who plays as a forward for Bangladesh Football League club City Club.

== Club creer ==
Okafor began his football youth career at Enyimba International F.C. and professional career with Crown F.C. before moved to Warri Wolves in 2014. He played two seasons at Rivers United before he moved to Turkey to play for Giresunspor in 2014. In August 2016, he signed at Giresunspor in TFF First League. In the summer of 2017, he joined Yalova SK. He later joined Doğan Türk Birliği in the winter of 2018.

In August 2026, Okafor joined City Club after leaving Fortis.

== International career ==
Okafor was called up to the senior team for the first time in March 2015 for a friendly against the Cranes of Uganda and South Africa’s Bafana Bafana.
