= Hayyaan Khattak =

Pakistani footballer

Personal information
- Full name: Mohammad Hayyaan Khattak
- Date of birth: 6 October 2003 (age 23)
- Place of birth: Peshawar, Pakistan
- Height: 1.85 m (6 ft 1 in)
- Position: Midfielder

Team information
- Current team: POPO FC

Youth career
- POPO FC

Senior career*
| Years | Team | Apps | (Gls) |
| 2020– | POPO FC | | |
| 2026 | → Brothers Union (loan) | 5 | (0) |

International career^{‡}
| 2023– | Pakistan U23 | 4 | (0) |
| 2026– | Pakistan | 7 | (0) |
- * Club domestic league appearances and goals as of 25 March 2026 ‡ National team caps and goals as of 2 October 2026

Mohammad Hayyaan Khattak (Urdu: محمد حیان خٹک; born 6 October 2003) is a Pakistani professional footballer who plays as a midfielder for POPO FC and the Pakistan national team.

== Club career ==
=== POPO FC ===
Khattak started his playing career with Islamabad based club POPO FC.

==== Loan to Brothers Union ====
In January 2026, Khattak joined the Bangladeshi football club Brothers Union for the second round of the Bangladesh Football League.

== International career ==
Khattak was called for Pakistan U23 in September 2023 for the 2024 AFC U-23 Asian Cup qualification. He again participated in the 2026 AFC U-23 Asian Cup qualification, making all three appearances.

He made his senior debut for Pakistan at the 2027 AFC Asian Cup qualification, in a 1–1 draw against Afghanistan on 14 October 2025.

== Career statistics ==
=== International ===
As of 2 October 2026

Appearances and goals by national team and year
| National team | Year | Apps | Goals |
|---|---|---|---|
| Pakistan | 2025 | 1 | 0 |
| Pakistan | 2026 | 6 | 0 |
| Total | | 7 | 0 |

== Honours ==
Pakistan

- Diamond Jubilee International Football Tournament: 2026
