= Ernest Boateng =

Ghanaian footballer

Personal information
- Date of birth: 6 June 2001 (age 25)
- Place of birth: Accra, Ghana
- Height: 1.87 m (6 ft 2 in)
- Position: Centre-forward

Team information
- Current team: Rahmatganj MFS
- Number: 14

Youth career
- –2019: Vision

Senior career*
Years	Team	Apps	(Gls)
2019−2022	DAC Dunajská Streda	2	(0)
2019−2022	→ Šamorín (loan)	44	(5)
2023	Real Kashmir	9	(3)
2023−24	Rahmatganj MFS	16	(9)
2024−2025	Mohammedan SC	5	(1)
2025−2026	Rahmatganj MFS	7	(3)
- * Club domestic league appearances and goals as of 15 May 2026

Ernest Boateng (born 6 June 2001) is a Ghanaian professional footballer who plays as a forward. He last played for Bangladesh Premier League club Rahmatganj MFS.

== Club career ==
=== DAC Dunajská Streda ===
Boateng made his Fortuna Liga debut for Dunajská Streda against Slovan Bratislava on 7 December 2019. He completed the full match of the 2−0 defeat.
