= Mohammad Abdullah (footballer) =

Bangladeshi footballer

Personal information
- Full name: Mohammad Abdullah
- Date of birth: 16 October 1997 (age 29)
- Place of birth: Sirajganj, Bangladesh
- Height: 1.75 m (5 ft 9 in)
- Positions: Attacking midfielder; winger

Team information
- Current team: PWD
- Number: 10

Senior career*
Years	Team	Apps	(Gls)
2015–2016	Dilkusha		
2016–2017	Arambagh KS		(3)
2017–2018	Chittagong Abahani	21	(1)
2018	Saif	0	(0)
2018–2022	Sheikh Russel KC	27	(4)
2022–2023	Rahmatganj MFS	1	(0)
2023	Bangladesh Police	9	(4)
2023–2024	Sheikh Jamal DC	15	(1)
2024–2025	Fortis	13	(2)
2025–	PWD	10	(1)

International career^{‡}
2018	Bangladesh U23	7	(0)
2016–	Bangladesh	9	(0)
- * Club domestic league appearances and goals as of 29 May 2025 ‡ National team caps and goals as of 15 June 2021

Mohammad Abdullah (Bengali: মোহাম্মদ আবদুল্লাহ; born October 16, 1997) is a Bangladeshi professional football player who plays as a midfielder for Bangladesh Football League club PWD and the Bangladesh national team. Mainly an attacking midfielder, he can also play as either a left-winger or right-winger.

== Early life ==
Starting football at the age of six, Abdullah's eventually participated in the Bangabandhu Gold Cup primary school tournament in 2010.

== Club career ==
In 2015, Dilkusha SC, a Dhaka Third Division League club signed Abdullah after an eight-month training camp at the Bangladesh Football Federation academy, later transferring to Arambagh Krira Sangha before making the preliminary Bangladesh national football team roster.

== International career ==
He was part of the Bangladesh national team congregation that traveled to Bhutan to play in the 2019 AFC Asian Cup qualifiers against the Bhutan national football team.

He was also included in the 2022 FIFA World Cup qualification squad.

In September 2018, Abdullah suffered a ligament tear while training with the national team for a FIFA Friendly against Sri Lanka. The injury would leave him out of action for over five months.

== Honours ==
Dilkusha SC

- Dhaka Third Division League: 2015
