= Samuel Boateng =

Ghanaian footballer

Personal information
- Full name: Samuel Boateng
- Date of birth: 12 November 1997 (age 28)
- Place of birth: Ghana
- Height: 1.72 m (5 ft 8 in)
- Position: Striker

Team information
- Current team: Mohammedan SC
- Number: 10

Senior career*
Years	Team	Apps	(Gls)
2021–2023	Asante Kotoko	30	(4)
2023	Samartex	11	(0)
2024	Nzema Kotoko	17	(4)
2024–25	Rahmatganj MFS	18	(18)
2025–26	Mohammedan SC	15	(5)
- * Club domestic league appearances and goals as of 15 May 2026

Samuel Boateng (born 12 November 1997) is a Ghanaian professional footballer who plays as a forward for Bangladesh Premier League club Mohammedan SC.

== Club career ==
=== Rahmatganj MFS ===
On 4 January 2025, Boateng scored a double hat-trick against Dhaka Wanderers Club in a 6–0 victory in the 2024–25 Bangladesh Premier League. He became only the second player in Premier League history to achieve the feat following Paul Mawachukwu's double hat-trick against Rahmatganj MFS in the 2007 B.League.
