= PWD Sports Club =

- Full name: Public Works Department Sports Club
- Short name: PWDSC
- Founded: 1954; 72 years ago
- Ground: Shaheed Barkat Stadium
- Capacity: 5,000
- Owner: Public Works Department
- President: Md Shamim Akhter
- Head Coach: Md Anawer Hossain
- League: Bangladesh Football League
- 2025–26: Bangladesh Football League, 8th of 10
Home colours	Away colours

PWD Sports Club (Bengali: পিডব্লিউডি স্পোর্টস ক্লাব), also referred to as PWD SC, is a professional football club based in Segunbagicha area of Dhaka, Bangladesh. The club currently competes in the Bangladesh Football League, the first tier of Bangladeshi football, after being promoted from the second-tier Bangladesh Championship League in the 2024–25 season.

== History ==
=== Early years (1954–1979) ===
PWD Sporting Club was founded in 1954 as a recreational program by some sports-loving engineers of the Public Works Department. Some of the founding members of the club included its first president and chief engineer Eyaz Khan, Alhaj Uddin, Abdul Rahim, Fazlur Rahman, Fayyaz Ahmed, and Kazi Abdul Qader. The club tent was constructed on land owned by the Public Works Department in Segunbagicha of Dhaka.

In 1956, the club entered domestic football in Dhaka through the Third Division and became league champions in their first season. The following year, in 1957, the club became champions of the Second Division and gained promotion to the top-tier. The club entered the First Division in 1958 and under the captaincy of Anjam Hossain, they finished in third-place. In the same year, PWD, led by the Pakistan national team's central defender, Nabi Chowdhury, participated in the Aga Khan Gold Cup. They defeated Central Jail and Sindh Youngmen's Club by 8–0 and 5–1, respectively, before losing 2–5 to Keamari Muhammadan prior to the quarter-final.

In 1965, PWD ended Victoria Sporting Club's 67-game unbeaten streak in the league's sixth round. However, following the Independence of Bangladesh, they elected a new club committee led by two of their previous members, Abdul Rahim and Fazlur Rahman. This change saw them battling relegation almost every season, with the exception of reaching the Super League round in 1974, 1976, and 1977. The club was relegated from the top-flight after finishing bottom of the league in 1979.

=== Yo-yo years (1980–2013) ===
The club decided against participating in the Dhaka Second Division League in 1980 and began their hunt for promotion from 1981. PWD earned promotion back to the top-flight as the 1984 Second Division champion, with the help of their 16-goal striker, Mostafizur Rahman Mostak. In 1985, Mostak helped PWD remain in the top-flight by scoring 9 goals as the club finished sixth, 13 points clear of relegation.

During the 1989–90 season, the club coached by former Sri Lanka national team captain, Pakir Ali, finished fourth in the league. PWD was also one of the initial members of the Dhaka Premier Division League in 1993; however in 1994, they were relegated to the First Division – then the second-tier of football.

In 1996, PWD were relegated to the Second Division after finishing bottom of the table in the First Division. In 1999, the club were promoted back to the First Division as unbeaten league champions with 39 points from 11 games, however, their stay only lasted a season, and were once again relegated to the Second Division.

The club kept dropping down divisions, and were relegated to the Dhaka Third Division League in 2005. The club returned to the Second Division as champions in 2009, determining their promotion before their final game of the season as group champions by defeating Tongi KC 1–0. In 2014, after a gap of 20-years, the club returned to Dhaka's top-flight football league, the Dhaka Senior Division League – now serving as the country's third-tier. In their promotion campaign, the club coached by Arman Hossain, were runners-up in the Second Division, behind champions Bangladesh Police.

=== Progression (2014–present) ===
Although PWD guaranteed their return to the top-flight of Dhaka in 2014, the Senior Division League was not held again until three years later, in 2017. Following their initial promotion, the league was held only three times, meaning the club would be inactive in domestic football for much of the decade. The club finished in third place in the 2021–22 Dhaka Senior Division League, behind Somaj Kallyan KS Mugda and Jatrabari KC, which initially meant they missed out on promotion to the professional second-tier league, the Bangladesh Championship League, by only two points. The club were also awarded with the Fair Play Trophy.

In November 2023, PWD announced that they would be participating in the 2023–24 Bangladesh Championship League, as the champions and runners-up of the 2021–22 Dhaka Senior Division League were unable to attain professional league club licensing, which opened the path to the third-place team, PWD, who successfully applied for the license.

== Current squad ==
As of 3 September 2026

Note: Flags indicate national team as defined under FIFA eligibility rules; some limited exceptions apply. Players may hold more than one non-FIFA nationality.

No.	Pos.	Nation	Player
1	GK	BAN	Md Saju Ahamed
28	GK	BAN	Md Rahul Hossen
22	GK	BAN	Md Anik Ahamed
31	GK	BAN	Mostafa Khan
4	DF	BAN	Sumon Kumar Das
20	DF	GER	Flodyn Ruchelvy Ulrich Baloki
5	DF	BAN	Ikramul Islam
25	DF	BAN	Md Imadul Haque
15	DF	BAN	Md Naasrullah Sheikh
3	DF	BAN	Ihsan Habib Riduan
13	DF	BAN	Md Ratul
27	DF	BAN	Sirajul Islam Rana
16	DF	BAN	Md Aksh Ali
2	DF	BAN	Mobinur Rashid
32	MF	BAN	Khandaker Khalid Hasan
6	MF	BAN	Md Sabbir Hossain
8	MF	NEP	Janmejay Dhami
23	MF	BAN	Md Rakibul Islam Rakib
21	MF	BAN	Md Mahin Sheikh
30	MF	BAN	Al Nahiyan Rahat
10	MF	EGY	Kheled Reda Abobakr Ahmed Aly
34	MF	BAN	Mehedi Hasan
19	MF	BAN	Md Manik
24	MF	BAN	Md Shadin
35	MF	BAN	Md Jamir Uddin
11	MF	BAN	Mohammed Nazim Uddin
79	MF	BAN	Md Swapon Hossen
26	MF	BAN	Md Ratul Hasan
29	MF	BAN	M H Mohibbullah
18	MF	BAN	Md Yamin Rana
7	MF	BAN	Nihat Jaman Ucchash
12	FW	BAN	Md Jubayer Ahmad
40	FW	BAN	Md Raisul Islam Rahid
17	FW	BAN	Md Yasin Arafat Sifit
9	FW	CMR	Yohan Thewole Mbida

|} |}

== Personnel ==
=== Current technical staff ===
As of 11 April 2025

Position	Name
Head coach	(Bangladesh) Md Anawer Hossain
Team Manager	(Bangladesh) Md Iftekharul Islam
Assistant Manager	(Bangladesh) Md Shafiqur Rahman (Bangladesh) Wahid Murad Azam (Bangladesh) Abrar Jahin Shrestha
Assistant Coach	(Bangladesh) Md Shahanur Rahman
Assistant Manager	(Bangladesh) Md Shafiqur Rahman
Team Leader	(Bangladesh) ANM Mazaharul Islam
Goalkeeping Coach	(Bangladesh) Md Meraz
Media Officer	(Bangladesh) Md Apel Mahmud
Masseur	(Bangladesh) Md Saiful Islam

=== Club officials ===
As of 15 August 2025

Position	Name
President	(Bangladesh) Md Shamim Akhter
General Secretary	(Bangladesh) Moshiur Rahman Akondo

=== Head coach ===
As of 23 May 2026

Head Coach	From	To	P	W	D	L	GS	GA	%W
(Bangladesh) Md Anawer Hossain	21 February 2024	Present	53	24	13	16	69	53	45.28

== Honours ==
- Bangladesh Championship League
  - Champions (1): 2024–25
- Dhaka Second Division League
  - Champions (3): 1957, 1984, 1999
  - Runners-up (1): 2013
- Dhaka Third Division League
  - Champions (2): 1956, 2009

== Notable players ==
- The players below had senior international cap(s) for their respective countries. Players whose name is listed, represented their countries before or after playing for PWD Sports Club.

Asia

- (Pakistan) Nabi Chowdhury (1958)
- (Pakistan) Abdul Jabbar (1964)
- (Pakistan) Abid Hussain Ghazi (1967–68)
- (Pakistan) Qadir Bakhsh (1971)
- (Sri Lanka) Ratnayaka Premalal (1991–92)
- (Pakistan) Ali Uzair (2026–present)

== Other departments ==
=== Field Hockey ===
PWD Sports Club has a field hockey team, which currently participates in the First Division Hockey League, the country's second-tier hockey league. The club gained promotion to the league in 2014 as champions of the Second Division Hockey League.

=== Cricket ===
The club's cricket team competed in the Dhaka First Division Cricket League until the turn of the century. Most recently, in 2021, the team competed in the Summer Classic Cricket Tournament, where they reached the Super League round.

== See also ==
- List of football clubs in Bangladesh
- History of football in Bangladesh
