= Shaheed Dhirendranath Datta Stadium =

Multipurpose stadium in Comilla, Bangladesh

Shaheed Dhirendranath Datta Stadium, Cumilla শহীদ ধীরেন্দ্রনাথ দত্ত স্টেডিয়াম, কুমিল্লা
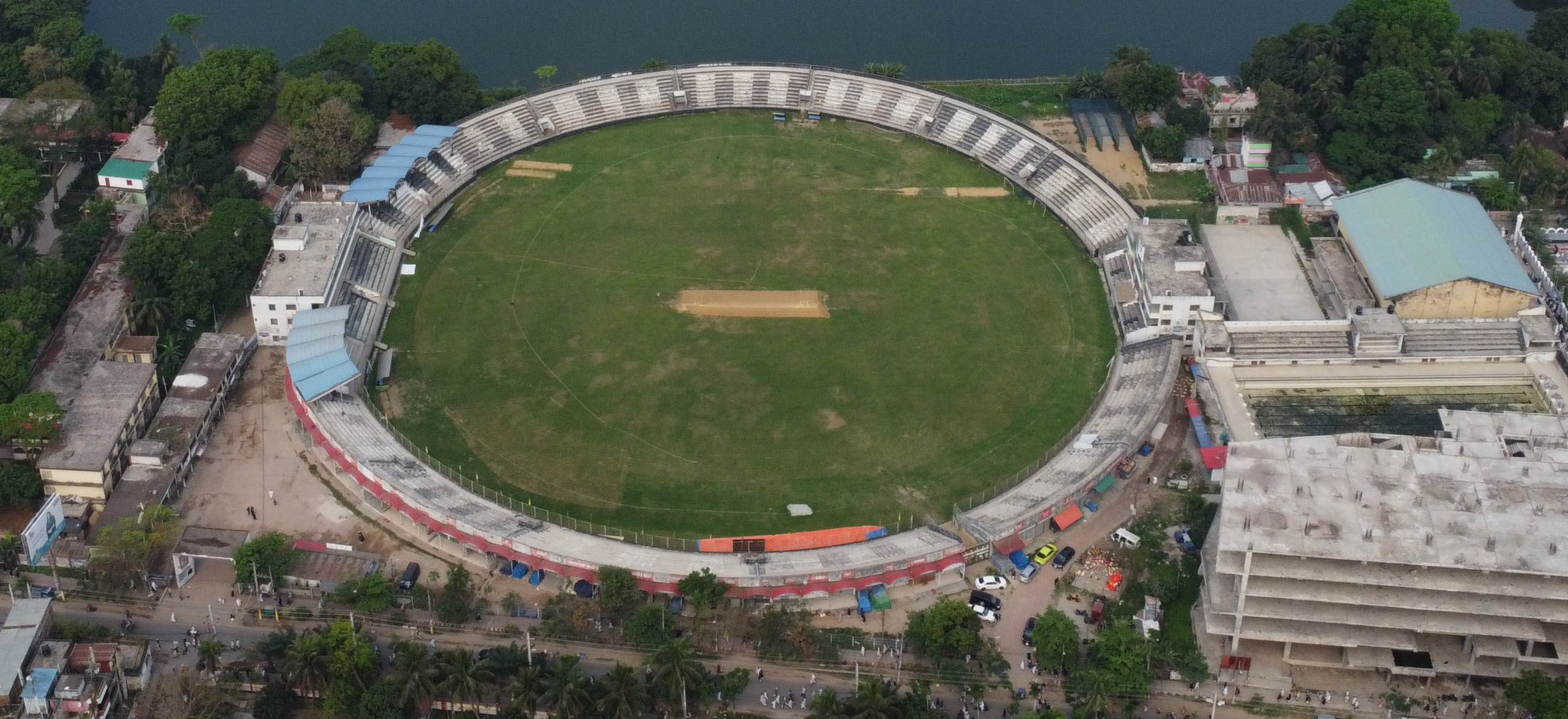
- Interactive map of Shaheed Dhirendranath Datta Stadium, Cumilla শহীদ ধীরেন্দ্রনাথ দত্ত স্টেডিয়াম, কুমিল্লা
- Full name: Bhasha Shoinik Shaheed Dhirendranath Datta Stadium
- Location: Shaheed Munshi Kabir Uddin Road, Circuit House More, Comilla, Bangladesh
- Coordinates: 23°27′51.82″N 91°10′52.89″E
- Owner: National Sports Council
- Operator: District Sports Council
- Capacity: 18,000
- Surface: Natural grass
- Field size: 180 m × 132 m (197 yd × 144 yd)

Tenants
- Dhaka Abahani (2025–present); Mohammedan (2025–present)

Website
- ESPN

Shaheed Dhirendranath Datta Stadium (Bengali: শহীদ ধীরেন্দ্রনাথ দত্ত স্টেডিয়াম), also known as Comilla Stadium, is a multi-purpose stadium located in Comilla, Bangladesh. The stadium is named after Dhirendranath Datta.

== History ==
It served as home venue of football clubs Mohammedan and Dhaka Abahani during the 2021–22 Bangladesh Premier League. The stadium was reallocated to both clubs for the 2025–26 Bangladesh Premier League.

== Cricket ==
Between 2000 and 2004, this stadium served as one of the home venues for the Chittagong Division. During this period, the ground hosted a total of 11 First-class and 11 List A matches.

== Renovation ==
In 2016, the Government of Bangladesh appropriated ৳32 crore (US$2.6 million) to renovate the stadium.

== See also ==
- Stadiums in Bangladesh
- List of football stadiums in Bangladesh
- List of cricket grounds in Bangladesh
