= Akobir Turaev =

Uzbek-Malaysian footballer

Personal information
- Date of birth: 3 November 1996 (age 30)
- Place of birth: Uzbekistan
- Height: 1.87 m (6 ft 1 1/2 in)
- Positions: Striker; winger

Team information
- Current team: PWD
- Number: 32

Youth career
- 2012–2013: FC Buxoro U21

Senior career*
Years	Team	Apps	(Gls)
2013–2016	FK Buxoro	47	(6)
2016–2017	Pakhtakor Tashkent	7	(1)
2017–2019	FK Buxoro	9	(2)
2019–2020	Rahmatganj MFS	10	(2)
2020–2021	FK Mash'al Mubarek	7	(2)
2021	Eskhata Khujand	17	(9)
2021–2022	TRAU	6	(1)
2022	Neftchi		
2023–2024	Ravshan Kulob		
2024–2025	Fakirerpool YMC	9	(3)
2025	Brothers Union	5	(1)
2025–	PWD	1	(1)

International career^{‡}
	Uzbekistan U17	10	(4)
	Uzbekistan U19	5	(1)
- Uzbekistan U23
- * Club domestic league appearances and goals as of 27 September 2025 ‡ National team caps and goals as of 27 March 2022

Akobir Turaev (born 3 November 1996) is an Uzbek professional footballer who plays as a forward for Bangladesh Football League club PWD.

== Club career ==
Turaev began his football career with U21 side of FC Buxoro in 2012 before moving to the senior side of the club in 2013. He was later loaned out to Pakhtakor Tashkent in 2016. He also featured in Pakhtakor's 3–0 win against Al-Jazira in the AFC Champions League. After completing his loan spell with Pakhtakor, he returned to his parent club Buxoro the following season.

Turaev was a part of Buxoro until the end of 2018–19 season. During his time at the club, he scored three goals in 20 matches. In 2019, he set out for a new challenge abroad and joined Bangladeshi side Rahmatganj MFS. He scored two goals in 10 matches for the Bangladeshi outfit before returning back to Uzbekistan. He signed for FK Mash'al Mubarek in August 2020, but moved to Tajikistan in January 2021 for lack of game-time. He scored eight goals and provided an assist in 15 appearances for Eskhata Khujand in the Tajikistan Higher League, Tajikistan's top tier.

Akobir signed for TRAU on August 30, 2021, on a one-year deal in which the 2021–22 I-League began started from the last week of December. He scored his first goal for the club against Sreenidi Deccan on 3 March 2022.

On 15 July 2023, Ravshan Kulob announced the signing of Turaev.

In August 2024, Akobir joined newly promoted Bangladesh Premier League club Fakirerpool Young Men's Club.

== Honours ==
Rahmatgonj MFS

- Federation Cup runner-up: 2019

Pakhtakor Tashkent

- Uzbekistan Super Cup runner-up: 2016
