= Shaheed Barkat Stadium =

Bangladeshi Stadium located in Gazipur District

- Interactive map of Shaheed Barkat Stadium
- Location: Gazipur, Bangladesh
- Coordinates: 23°59′54.37″N 90°25′30.58″E
- Owner: National Sports Council
- Operator: National Sports Council
- Surface: Grass
- Field size: 120 m x 88 m (Rectangular)

Tenants
- Gazipur Football Team; Bangladesh Police FC

Shaheed Barkat Stadium is a football stadium owned and operated by National Sports Council in Gazipur, Bangladesh.

== See also ==
- List of football stadiums in Bangladesh
- Stadiums in Bangladesh
