= 2025–26 Abahani Limited Dhaka season =

Abahani Ltd. Dhaka 2025–26 football season

Abahani Limited Dhaka
2025–26 season
- Chairman: Salman F Rahman
- Director: Kazi Nabil Ahmed
- Head coach: Maruful Haque
- Stadium: Shaheed Dhirendranath Datta Stadium
- Bangladesh Football League: TBD
- Federation Cup: TBD
- Independence Cup: Not held
- AFC Challenge League: Preliminary stage
Home colours	Away colours

The 2025–26 season is Abahani Limited Dhaka's 18th consecutive season in the Bangladesh Football League and 51st overall season in the top flight of Bangladeshi football. In addition to the domestic league, Abahani Ltd. Dhaka will participate in the season's edition of the AFC Challenge League, and the Federation Cup. This season covered the period from 1 May 2025 to 1 June 2026.

== Players ==
As of 15 August 2025.

No.	Player	Nat.	Position(s)	Date Of Birth	Year Signed	Previous Club
Goalkeepers
1	Mahfuz Hasan Pritom	(Bangladesh)	GK	5 November 1999 (aged 25)	2024	Sheikh Jamal DC
20	Pappu Hossain	(Bangladesh)	GK	7 March 1999 (aged 26)	2025	Brothers Union
22	Shamim Hossen	(Bangladesh)	GK	1 November 1998 (aged 26)	2020	Abahani Youth Team
25	Shahidul Alam Sohel	(Bangladesh)	GK	1 May 1992 (aged 33)	2025	Rahmatganj MFS
30	Mitul Marma	(Bangladesh)	GK	11 December 2003 (aged 21)	2024	Sheikh Russel KC
31	S P Rafiz	(Bangladesh)	GK		2025	BKSP
Defenders
2	Hasan Murad Tipu	(Bangladesh)	RB/CB	1 February 1998 (aged 27)	2024	Mohammedan SC
3	Kamrul Islam	(Bangladesh)	LB	25 December 1998 (aged 26)	2024	Mohammedan SC
4	Yeasin Khan	(Bangladesh)	CB	16 September 1994 (aged 30)	2024	Chittagong Abahani
5	Shakil Hossain	(Bangladesh)	CB/DM	6 July 2002 (aged 22)	2024	Sheikh Jamal DC
15	Sushanto Tripura	(Bangladesh)	CB/RB	5 October 1998 (aged 26)	2025	Brothers Union
16	Alomgir Molla	(Bangladesh)	LB	6 November 2000 (aged 24)	2025	Brothers Union
18	Shakir Ahmed	(Bangladesh)	RB	4 February 2002 (aged 23)	2020	Abahani Youth Team
24	Assaduzzaman Bablu (captain)	(Bangladesh)	CB/RB	1 January 1996 (aged 29)	2022	Sheikh Russel KC
29	Md Abdul Riyad Fahim	(Bangladesh)	CB/DM	25 August 2008 (aged 16)	2025	BFF Elite Academy
44	Sabuz Hossain	(Bangladesh)	CB/RB	23 July 2002 (aged 22)	2024	Fortis FC
Midfielders
7	Shekh Morsalin	(Bangladesh)	AM/CF	19 February 2005 (aged 20)	2025	Bashundhara Kings
8	Syed Quazem Shah	(Bangladesh)	AM/RW	25 October 1998 (aged 26)	2025	Bangladesh Police FC
9	Bruno Matos	(Brazil)	AM/RW/LW	5 June 1990 (aged 34)	2025	(Brazil) Sampaio Corrêa
12	Enamul Islam Gazi	(Bangladesh)	AM	12 October 2001 (aged 23)	2023	Rahmatganj MFS
13	Papon Singh	(Bangladesh)	DM/CM	31 December 1999 (aged 25)	2022	Uttar Baridhara
14	Mahdi Yusuf Khan	(Bangladesh)	AM	3 December 1996 (aged 28)	2024	Bangladesh Police
27	Tonmoy Das	(Bangladesh)	DM	2 May 2001 (aged 23)	2024	Rahmatganj MFS
28	Iftiar Hossain	(Bangladesh)	CM/DM	24 October 2006 (aged 18)	2025	BFF Elite Academy
Forwards
6	Emeka Ogbugh	(Nigeria)	RW	22 February 1990 (aged 35)	2025	Dhaka Abahani
10	Souleymane Diabate	(Mali)	CF	23 March 1991 (aged 34)	2025	Mohammedan SC
11	Al-Amin	(Bangladesh)	CF/LW/RW	29 March 2004 (aged 21)	2025	Bangladesh Police FC
17	Jafar Iqbal	(Bangladesh)	LW/RW	27 September 1999 (aged 25)	2024	Mohammedan SC
19	Mohammad Ibrahim	(Bangladesh)	LW/RW/AM	7 August 1997 (aged 27)	2024	Bashundhara Kings
21	Md Sayed Hossain Sayem	(Bangladesh)	CF/RW/LW	7 February 2002 (aged 23)	2025	Fakirerpool YMC
23	Mirajul Islam	(Bangladesh)	CF/RW/AM	1 October 2006 (aged 18)	2024	BFF Elite Academy
26	Asadul Molla	(Bangladesh)	CF/RW	26 December 2006 (aged 18)	2023	BFF Elite Academy

== Friendlies ==
=== Pre-season ===
5 August 2025	Bashundhara Kings	2–1	Dhaka Abahani	Dhaka
			Morsalin	Stadium: Bashundhara Kings practice ground

10 September 2025	Dhaka Abahani	2–0	Fakirerpool	Dhaka
16:00 BST (UTC+6)	Ibrahim; Jafar			Stadium: Abahani Limited field

== Transfers ==
=== In ===
No.	Pos	Player	Previous club	Fee	Date	Source
11	FW	Al-Amin	Bangladesh Police FC	Free	7 July 2025	
7	MF	Shekh Morsalin	Bashundhara Kings	Free	15 July 2025	
10	FW	(Mali) Souleymane Diabate	Mohammedan SC	Free	15 July 2025	
8	MF	Shah Quazem Kirmane	Bangladesh Police FC	Free	20 July 2025	
15	DF	Sushanto Tripura	Brothers Union	Free	25 July 2025	
16	DF	Alomgir Molla	Brothers Union	Free	13 August 2025	
20	GK	Pappu Hossain	Brothers Union	Free	14 August 2025	
25	GK	Shahidul Alam Sohel	Rahmatganj MFS	Free	14 August 2025	
9	MF	(Brazil) Bruno Matos	(Brazil) Sousa Esporte Clube	Free	14 August 2025	

=== Out ===
No.	Pos	Player	Moved to	Fee	Date	Source
25	GK	Arifuzzaman Himel	Free Agent	Released	1 May 2025	
20	FW	Sumon Reza	Mohammedan SC	Free	16 July 2025	
10	FW	(Brazil) Raphael Augusto	Bashundhara Kings	Free	28 July 2025	
8	MF	Mohammad Ridoy	Bashundhara Kings	Free	28 July 2025	
9	FW	Shahriar Emon	Bashundhara Kings	Free	28 July 2025	
17	FW	Sarower Zaman Nipu	Bangladesh Police FC	Free	10 August 2025	
2	DF	Shahin Ahammad	Rahmatganj MFS	Free	14 August 2025	
27	MF	Md Faizullah	Rahmatganj MFS	Free	14 August 2025	
14	DF	Yeasin Arafat	Brothers Union	Free	14 August 2025	
7	MF	Rabiul Hasan	Brothers Union	Free	14 August 2025	
18	FW	Md Meraj Pradhan	Brothers Union	Free	14 August 2025	
34	FW	Aminur Rahman Sajib	Brothers Union	Free	14 August 2025	
12	FW	Arman Foysal Akash	PWD SC	Free	14 August 2025	

== Competitions ==
Win Draw Loss Fixtures

=== Overall ===
Competition	First match	Last match	Final Position
BFL			
Federation Cup			
Independence Cup			
AFC Challenge League			

=== Overview ===
Competition	Record							
Competition	Pld	W	D	L	GF	GA	GD	Win %
BFL	1	0	1	0	0	0	+0	0.00
Independence Cup	0	0	0	0	0	0	+0	—
Federation Cup	0	0	0	0	0	0	+0	—
AFC Challenge League	1	0	0	1	0	2	−2	0.00
Total	2	0	1	1	0	2	−2	0.00

Source: Competitions

=== Football League ===
==== League table ====
Pos	Team	Pld	W	D	L	GF	GA	GD	Pts	Qualification or relegation
1	Bashundhara Kings (Note: Bashundhara Kings and Dhaka Abahani will not be able to participate in the AFC Challenge League due to the risk of FIFA sanctions and the lack of an AFC club license.) (C)	18	12	5	1	42	18	+24	41	
2	Dhaka Abahani	18	11	4	3	37	15	+22	37	
3	Fortis	18	10	5	3	31	13	+18	35	Qualification for the AFC; Challenge League qualifying stage
4	Bangladesh Police	18	6	9	3	19	15	+4	27	Qualification for the AFC; Challenge League qualifying stage
5	Mohammedan	18	6	5	7	27	20	+7	23	

Source: Soccerway
Rules for classification: 1) Points; 2) Goal difference; 3) Number of goals scored.
(C) Champion

==== Results summary ====
Overall								Home						Away					
Pld	W	D	L	GF	GA	GD	Pts	W	D	L	GF	GA	GD	W	D	L	GF	GA	GD
1	0	1	0	0	0	0	1	0	0	0	0	0	0	0	1	0	0	0	0

Source: Soccerway

==== Results by round ====
Round	1	2	3	4	5	6	7	8	9	10	11	12	13	14	15	16	17	18
Ground	A																	
Result	D																	
Position	7																	

Source: Matches
A = Away; H = Home; W = Win; D = Draw; L = Loss; P = Postponed

=== Matches ===
26 September 2025 1	Rahmatganj MFS	0–0	Dhaka Abahani	Munshiganj
18:45 BST (UTC+6)	Rajon (yellow card) 21'; Limbu (yellow card) 33'; Arafat (red card) 39'; Sayde (yellow card) 59'; Shahin (yellow card) 81'	Report	Papon (yellow card) 26'; Ibrahim (yellow card) 37'; Asadul (yellow card) 65'	Stadium: Munshiganj Stadium; Referee: Md Saymoon Hasan Sany

19 October 2025 2	Dhaka Abahani	1–2	Brothers Union	Comilla
15:45 BST (UTC+6)	Diabate 90+2'	Report	Anjan 4'; Becaye Diarra (yellow card) 45+3'; Rudwere 58' (pen.); Kawsar Ali (yellow card) 79'	Stadium: Comilla Stadium; Referee: Bituraj Barua

24 November 2025 3	Mohammedan	3–2	Dhaka Abahani	Comilla
15:45 BST (UTC+6)	Rahim 20'; Eli Keke 31'; Boateng 58'; Rajib (yellow card) 65'	Report	Hasan Murad (yellow card) 49'; Papon Singh 73'; Morsalin 79'	Stadium: Comilla Stadium; Referee: Mohamed Alamgir

28 November 2025 4	Dhaka Abahani	2–0	Bangladesh Police	Comilla
15:30 BST (UTC+6)	Diabete 25' (pen.); Papon (yellow card) 36'; Enaul 43'; Morsalin (yellow card) 88'; Asadul (red card) 90+1'	Report	Nirob (yellow card) 90+9'	Stadium: Comilla Stadium; Referee: Bituraj Barua

6 December 2025 5	Fortis	0–0	Dhaka Abahani	Dhaka
15:30 BST (UTC+6)		Report	Gazi (yellow card) 4'	Stadium: Bashundhara Kings Arena; Referee: Mohammed Alamgir Sarker

13 December 2025 6	Fakirerpool	0–5	Dhaka Abahani	Manikganj
15:30 BST (UTC+6)	Shihab Mia (yellow card) 89'	Report	Diabate 32', 41'; Sushanto (yellow card) 35'; Mirajul 43'; Morsalin 79'; Al-Amin 86'	Stadium: Manikganj Stadium; Referee: SM Jashim Akhter

19 December 2025 7	Dhaka Abahani	2–2	PWD	Comilla
15:30 BST (UTC+6)	Al-Amin 53'; Morsalin 74'; Quazem Shah (yellow card) 88'	Report	Shadin 10'; Akash (yellow card) 40'; Sharif (yellow card) 61'; Kofi (yellow card) 87'; Sumon (yellow card) 90+3'; Sayed 90+6' (yellow card) 90+6'	Stadium: Comilla Stadium; Referee: Nasid Uddin

27 December 2025 8	Bashundhara Kings	2–2	Dhaka Abahani	Dhaka
18:30 BST (UTC+6)	Fahim (yellow card) 2'; Rakib 5' (yellow card) 89'; Sunday 16'; Dorielton (yellow card) 39'; Augusto (yellow card) 75'	Report	Diabate 19', 51'; Morsalin (yellow card) 79'; Mirajul (yellow card) 81'; Shakil (yellow card) 90+2'	Stadium: Bashundhara Kings Arena; Referee: Md Saymoon Hasan Sany

3 January 2026 9	Dhaka Abahani	3–0	Arambagh	Comilla
15:30 BST (UTC+6)	Diabate 9', 60'; Bruno 40'; Sayem (yellow card) 90+1'	Report		Stadium: Comilla Stadium; Referee: Md Junayed Sharif

6 March 2026 10	Dhaka Abahani	4–1	Rahmatganj	Comilla
15:45 BST (UTC+6)	Bruno 21' (pen.), 53'; Sushanto (yellow card) 23'; Emeka 29'; Morsalin (yellow card) 72'; Quazem Shah 73'	Report	Rajon (yellow card) 13'; Shahin (yellow card) 16'; Mamun Alif (yellow card) 18'; Solomon King 90+4' (pen.)	Stadium: Comilla Stadium; Referee: Md Symoon Hasan Sany

14 March 2026 11	Brothers Union	1–2	Dhaka Abahani	Munshiganj
15:45 BST (UTC+6)	Kouyate (yellow card) 44'; Dost 87'; Ishaque (yellow card) 90+8'	Report	Emeka 5', 70'	Stadium: Munshiganj Stadium; Referee: Md Anisur Rahman Sagor

10 April 2026 12	Dhaka Abahani	2–1	Mohammedan	Comilla
15:30 BST (UTC+6)	Mirajul 17'; Diabate 66'	Report	Muzaffarov 3'; Topu (yellow card) 45+4' (yellow-red card) 90+6'	Stadium: Comilla Stadium; Referee: Md Jashim Akther

17 April 2026 13	Bangladesh Police	1–3	Dhaka Abahani	Gazipur
15:30 BST (UTC+6)	Nirob (yellow card) 23' (yellow-red card) 70'; Moin (yellow card) 43'; Bablu 45+2'; Darobe (yellow card) 65'; Manik (yellow card) 86'	Report	Diabate (yellow card) 21'; Emeka 32'; Yeasin (yellow card) 45+1'; Al-Amin 58'; Morsalin 78' (yellow card) 80' (yellow-red card) 85'; Sushanto (yellow card) 90+7'	Stadium: Shaheed Barkat Stadium; Referee: Bituraj Barua

24 April 2026 14	Dhaka Abahani	1–0	Fortis	Comilla
15:30 BST (UTC+6)	Mithu 1' (o.g.); Papon (yellow card) 29'; Mitul (yellow card) 89'	Report	Sajib (yellow card) 17'; Fahad (yellow card) 33'; Rasel (yellow card) 71'; Rony (yellow card) 76'	Stadium: Comilla Stadium; Referee: Md Symoon Hasan Sany

1 May 2026 15	Dhaka Abahani	2–0	Fakirerpool	Comilla
15:30 BST (UTC+6)	Emeka 39'; Morsalin 68'	Report	Amit (yellow card) 87'	Stadium: Comilla Stadium; Referee: Md Anisur Rahman Sagor

8 May 2026 16	PWD	0–2	Dhaka Abahani	Gazipur
15:45 BST (UTC+6)	Sumon (yellow card) 47'; Rakibul (yellow card) 81'	Report	Diabate 45'; Bablu (yellow card) 45+7'; Al-Amin (yellow card) 79'; Quazem Shah 82'	Stadium: Shaheed Barkat Stadium; Referee: Md Anisur Rahman Sagor

15 May 2026 17	Dhaka Abahani	0–2	Bashundhara Kings	Comilla
15:45 BST (UTC+6)	Kamrul (yellow card) 21'; Yeasin (yellow card) 39'; Diabate (yellow card) 52'	Report	Taj (yellow card) 16'; Dori 75'; Soehl 77'	Stadium: Comilla Stadium; Referee: Md Anisur Rahman Sagor

23 May 2026 18	Arambagh	0–4	Dhaka Abahani	Manikganj
15:45 BST (UTC+6)	[[[Mohiuddin Ranu|Ranu]] (yellow card) 90+6'	Report	Emeka 43'; Yeasin (yellow card) 69'; Diabate 82'; Nikson 88' (o.g.); Morsalin 90+6'	Stadium: Shaheed Miraj-Tapan Stadium; Referee: Md Junayed Sharif

=== Federation Cup ===
Pos	Team	Pld	W	D	L	GF	GA	GD	Pts	Qualification
1	Brothers Union	4	3	1	0	5	0	+5	10	Qualified for QRF 1
2	Rahmatganj	4	1	3	0	3	1	+2	6	Advanced to QRF 2
3	PWD SC	4	2	0	2	3	5	−2	6	
4	Dhaka Abahani	4	1	1	2	5	5	0	4	
5	Fakirerpool	4	0	1	3	2	7	−5	1	

Source: Sofascore
Rules for classification: Group stages tiebreakers

24 October 2025 1	Dhaka Abahani	4–2	Fakirerpool	Dhaka
14:45 BST (UTC+6)	Diabate 6', 40' (pen.); Morsalin 35', 63'	Report	Tudu 51'; Riyad 69'	Stadium: Bashundhara Kings Arena; Referee: SM Jashim Akhter

9 December 2025 1	Dhaka Abahani	0–1	Brothers Union	Comilla
14:30 BST (UTC+6)		Report	Monir 17'	Stadium: Comilla Stadium; Referee: Md Saymoon Hasan Sany

23 December 2025 1	Dhaka Abahani	1–1	Rahmatganj	Comilla
14:30 BST (UTC+6)	Boateng 9'	Report	Morsalin 45+5' (pen.)	Stadium: Comilla Stadium; Referee: Mahmud Zamal Faruqee Nahid

24 February 2025 1	Dhaka Abahani	0–1	PWD	Dhaka
14:45 BST (UTC+6)		Report	Abdullah 66'	Stadium: Bashundhara Kings Arena; Referee: Md Nasir Uddin

=== AFC Challenge League ===
==== Preliminary stage ====
12 August 2025 Preliminary stage	Dhaka Abahani (Bangladesh)	0–2	(Kyrgyzstan) Muras United	Dhaka
17:00 BST (UTC+6)	Quazem (yellow card) 56'; Mirajul (yellow card) 69'	AFC Report; GSA Report	Dzhumashev 48', 90+2'	Stadium: National Stadium; Attendance: 3,628; Referee: Torphong Somsing (Thailand)

== Statistics ==
=== Squad statistics ===
No.	Pos	Nat	Player	Total		BPL		Federation Cup		Independence Cup		AFC Challenge League	
No.	Pos	Nat	Player	Apps	Goals	Apps	Goals	Apps	Goals	Apps	Goals	Apps	Goals
1	GK	(Bangladesh)	Mahfuz Hasan Pritom	0	0	0	0	0	0	0	0	0	0
22	GK	(Bangladesh)	Shamim Hossen	0	0	0	0	0	0	0	0	0	0
25	GK	(Bangladesh)	Shahidul Alam Sohel	0	0	0	0	0	0	0	0	0	0
30	GK	(Bangladesh)	Mitul Marma	0	0	0	0	0	0	0	0	0	0
30	GK	(Bangladesh)	S P Rafiz	0	0	0	0	0	0	0	0	0	0
2	DF	(Bangladesh)	Hasan Murad Tipu	0	0	0	0	0	0	0	0	0	0
3	DF	(Bangladesh)	Kamrul Islam	0	0	0	0	0	0	0	0	0	0
4	DF	(Bangladesh)	Yeasin Khan	0	0	0	0	0	0	0	0	0	0
5	DF	(Bangladesh)	Shakil Hossain	0	0	0	0	0	0	0	0	0	0
15	DF	(Bangladesh)	Sushanto Tripura	0	0	0	0	0	0	0	0	0	0
16	DF	(Bangladesh)	Alomgir Molla	0	0	0	0	0	0	0	0	0	0
18	DF	(Bangladesh)	Shakir Ahmed	0	0	0	0	0	0	0	0	0	0
24	DF	(Bangladesh)	Assaduzzaman Bablu	0	0	0	0	0	0	0	0	0	0
29	DF	(Bangladesh)	Md Abdul Riyad Fahim	0	0	0	0	0	0	0	0	0	0
44	DF	(Bangladesh)	Sabuz Hossain	0	0	0	0	0	0	0	0	0	0
7	MF	(Bangladesh)	Shekh Morsalin	0	0	0	0	0	0	0	0	0	0
8	MF	(Bangladesh)	Syed Quazem Shah	0	0	0	0	0	0	0	0	0	0
9	MF	(Brazil)	Bruno Matos	0	0	0	0	0	0	0	0	0	0
12	MF	(Bangladesh)	Enamul Islam Gazi	0	0	0	0	0	0	0	0	0	0
13	MF	(Bangladesh)	Papon Singh	0	0	0	0	0	0	0	0	0	0
14	MF	(Bangladesh)	Mahdi Yusuf Khan	0	0	0	0	0	0	0	0	0	0
27	MF	(Bangladesh)	Tonmoy Das	0	0	0	0	0	0	0	0	0	0
28	MF	(Bangladesh)	Iftiar Hossain	0	0	0	0	0	0	0	0	0	0
6	FW	(Nigeria)	Emeka Ogbugh	0	0	0	0	0	0	0	0	0	0
10	FW	(Mali)	Souleymane Diabate	0	0	0	0	0	0	0	0	0	0
11	FW	(Bangladesh)	Al-Amin	0	0	0	0	0	0	0	0	0	0
17	FW	(Bangladesh)	Jafar Iqbal	0	0	0	0	0	0	0	0	0	0
19	FW	(Bangladesh)	Mohammad Ibrahim	0	0	0	0	0	0	0	0	0	0
21	FW	(Bangladesh)	Md Sayed Hossain Sayem	0	0	0	0	0	0	0	0	0	0
23	FW	(Bangladesh)	Mirajul Islam	0	0	0	0	0	0	0	0	0	0
26	FW	(Bangladesh)	Asadul Molla	0	0	0	0	0	0	0	0	0	0

Source: Soccerway

=== Goalscorers ===
Rank	No.	Pos.	Nat.	Player	BFL	Federation Cup	Independence Cup	AFC Challenge League	Total
Total					0	0	0	0	0

Source: Matches

=== Assists ===
Rank	No.	Pos.	Nat.	Player	BFL	Federation Cup	Independence Cup	AFC Challenge League	Total
Total					0	0	0	0	0

Source: Soccerway
