= 2024–25 Abahani Limited Dhaka season =

Abahani Ltd. Dhaka 2024–25 football season

Abahani Limited Dhaka
2024–25 season
- Chairman: Salman F Rahman
- Director: Kazi Nabil Ahmed
- Head coach: Maruful Haque
- Stadium: Shaheed Dhirendranath Datta Stadium
- Bangladesh Premier League: Runners-up
- Federation Cup: Runners-up
- Independence Cup: Not Held
- Top goalscorer: League: Enamul Islam Gazi (6); All: Enamul Islam Gazi; Mohammad Ibrahim (6)
- Biggest win: 6–1 v Fakirerpool YMC (Home); 22 February 2025 (Premier League); 5–0 v Chittagong Abahani (Home); 21 May 2025 (Premier League)
- Biggest defeat: 0–2 v Bashundhara Kings (Away); 2 May 2025 (Premier League)
Home colours	Away colours

The 2024–25 season was Abahani Limited Dhaka's 17th consecutive season in the Bangladesh Premier League and 50th overall season in the top flight of Bangladeshi football. In addition to the domestic league, Abahani Ltd. Dhaka participated in the season's edition of the Federation Cup. The season covered the period from 1 June 2024 to 31 May 2025.

== Players ==
As of 1 March 2025.

No.	Player	Nat.	Position(s)	Date Of Birth	Year Signed	Previous club
Goalkeepers
1	Mahfuz Hasan Pritom	(Bangladesh)	GK	5 November 1999 (aged 24)	2024	Sheikh Jamal DC
22	Shamim Hossen	(Bangladesh)	GK	1 November 1998 (aged 25)	2020	Abahani Youth Team
25	Arifuzzaman Himel	(Bangladesh)	GK	10 July 1989 (aged 34)	2021	Bangladesh Police FC
30	Mitul Marma	(Bangladesh)	GK	11 December 2003 (aged 20)	2024	Sheikh Russel KC
Defenders
2	Shahin Ahammad	(Bangladesh)	RB	15 October 2003 (aged 20)	2024	Sheikh Russel KC
3	Hasan Murad Tipu	(Bangladesh)	RB/CB	1 February 1998 (aged 26)	2024	Mohammedan SC
4	Yeasin Khan	(Bangladesh)	CB	16 September 1994 (aged 29)	2024	Chittagong Abahani
5	Shakil Hossain	(Bangladesh)	CB/DM	6 July 2002 (aged 21)	2024	Sheikh Jamal DC
14	Yeasin Arafat	(Bangladesh)	LB	5 January 2003 (aged 21)	2024	Bashundhara Kings
15	Kamrul Islam	(Bangladesh)	LB	25 December 1998 (aged 25)	2024	Mohammedan SC
24	Assaduzzaman Bablu	(Bangladesh)	CB	1 January 1996 (aged 28)	2022	Sheikh Russel KC
33	Shakir Ahmed	(Bangladesh)	RB	4 February 2002 (aged 22)	2020	Abahani Youth Team
44	Sabuz Hossain	(Bangladesh)	CB/RB	23 July 2002 (aged 21)	2024	Fortis FC
Midfielders
7	Rabiul Hasan	(Bangladesh)	AM	26 June 1999 (aged 24)	2023	Bangladesh Police FC
8	Mohammad Ridoy (captain)	(Bangladesh)	DM	1 January 2002 (aged 22)	2019	Friends Social Organization
10	Raphael Augusto	(Brazil)	AM/CM	6 March 1991 (aged 33)	2025	Bangu
13	Papon Singh	(Bangladesh)	DM/CM	31 December 1999 (aged 24)	2022	Uttar Baridhara
16	Mahdi Yusuf Khan	(Bangladesh)	AM	3 December 1996 (aged 27)	2024	Bangladesh Police
21	Enamul Islam Gazi	(Bangladesh)	AM	12 October 2001 (aged 22)	2023	Rahmatganj MFS
27	Md Faizullah	(Bangladesh)	CM		2024	NoFeL SC
35	Tonmoy Das	(Bangladesh)	DM	2 May 2001 (aged 23)	2024	Rahmatganj MFS
Forwards
9	Shahriar Emon	(Bangladesh)	RW/LW	7 March 2001 (aged 23)	2024	Mohammedan SC
6	Emeka Ogbugh	(Nigeria)	RW	22 February 1990 (aged 34)	2025	Dhaka Abahani
11	Jafar Iqbal	(Bangladesh)	LW/RW	27 September 1999 (aged 24)	2024	Mohammedan SC
12	Arman Foysal Akash	(Bangladesh)	RW/LW/CF	13 January 2003 (aged 21)	2024	Fortis FC
15	Mohammad Ibrahim	(Bangladesh)	LW/RW/AM	7 August 1997 (aged 26)	2024	Bashundhara Kings
17	Sarower Zaman Nipu	(Bangladesh)	RW/LW/CF	5 June 2000 (aged 23)	2024	Sheikh Russel KC
18	Md Meraj Pradhan	(Bangladesh)	LW	4 September 2004 (aged 19)	2024	Bangladesh Army
20	Sumon Reza	(Bangladesh)	ST	15 June 1995 (aged 28)	2024	Sheikh Russel KC
23	Mirajul Islam	(Bangladesh)	CF/RW/AM	1 October 2006 (aged 17)	2024	BFF Elite Academy
26	Asadul Molla	(Bangladesh)	CF/RW	26 December 2006 (aged 17)	2023	BFF Elite Academy
34	Aminur Rahman Sajib	(Bangladesh)	CF/LW	18 June 1994 (aged 29)	2024	Bashundhara Kings
Left during the season
28	Syed Arafat Tasin	(Bangladesh)	DM	5 January 1991 (aged 33)	2018	
29	Alamin Hossain Anaf	(Bangladesh)	CF/RW/AM	24 September 2001 (aged 22)	2024	Abahani Youth Team

== Friendlies ==
=== Pre-season ===
7 November 2024	Dhaka Abahani	2–1	Bangladesh Navy	Dhanmondi, Dhaka
	Enamul; Jafar	Report	Sumon	Stadium: Abahani Limited field

22 November 2024	Dhaka Abahani	2–2	Fortis	Dhanmondi, Dhaka
14:00 UTC+6	Jafar; Sumon		?; ?	Stadium: Abahani Limited field

== Transfer ==
=== In ===
No.	Pos	Player	Previous club	Fee	Date	Source
14	DF	Yeasin Arafat	Bashundhara Kings	Free	27 June 2024	
30	GK	Mitul Marma	Sheikh Russel KC	Free	27 June 2024	
11	FW	Jafar Iqbal	Mohammedan SC	Free	27 June 2024	
9	FW	Shahriar Emon	Mohammedan SC	Free	27 June 2024	
3	DF	Hasan Murad Tipu	Mohammedan SC	Free	27 June 2024	
19	DF	Kamrul Islam	Mohammedan SC	Free	27 June 2024	
5	DF	Shakil Hossain	Sheikh Jamal DC	Free	27 June 2024	
1	GK	Mahfuz Hasan Pritom	Sheikh Jamal DC	Free	27 June 2024	
17	FW	Sarwar Zaman Nipu	Sheikh Russel KC	Free	27 June 2024	
2	DF	Shahin Ahammad	Sheikh Russel KC	Free	27 June 2024	
44	DF	Sabuz Hossain	Fortis FC	Free	27 June 2024	
12	FW	Arman Foysal Akash	Fortis FC	Free	27 June 2024	
4	DF	Yeasin Khan	Chittagong Abahani	Free	27 June 2024	
16	MF	Mahdi Yusuf Khan	Bangladesh Police FC	Free	27 June 2024	
15	FW	Mohammad Ibrahim	Bashundhara Kings	Free	22 August 2024	
18	FW	Md Meraj Pradhan	Bangladesh Army	Free	22 August 2024	
20	FW	Sumon Reza	Sheikh Russel KC	Free	22 August 2024	
23	FW	Mirajul Islam	BFF Elite Academy	Free	22 August 2024	
26	MF	Asadul Molla	BFF Elite Academy	Free	22 August 2024	
27	MF	Md Faizullah	NoFeL SC	Free	22 August 2024	
34	FW	Aminur Rahman Sajib	Bashundhara Kings	Free	22 August 2024	
35	MF	Tonmoy Das	Rahmatganj MFS	Free	22 August 2024	
29	FW	Alamin Hossain Anaf	Unknown	Free	22 August 2024	
10	MF	(Brazil) Raphael Augusto	(Brazil) Bangu	Free	4 February 2025	
6	FW	(Nigeria) Emeka Ogbugh	Free agent	Free	28 February 2025	

=== Out ===
No.	Pos	Player	Moved to	Fee	Date	Source
4	DF	Rezaul Karim Reza	Free agent	Released	1 June 2024	
3	DF	Rahmat Mia	Brothers Union	Free	1 June 2024	
5	DF	Riyadul Hasan Rafi	Mohammedan SC	Free	1 June 2024	
19	DF	Alomgir Molla	Brothers Union	Free	1 June 2024	
9	FW	(Saint Vincent and the Grenadines) Cornelius Stewart	(Indonesia) Semen Padang	Free	11 July 2024	
6	MF	(Brazil) Fernandes	Bashundhara Kings	Free	1 August 2024	
23	DF	(Iran) Milad Sheykh	Free agent	Released	19 August 2024	
	FW	(Nigeria) Emeka Ogbugh	Free agent	Released	19 August 2024	
17	FW	Mehedi Hasan Royal	Rahmatganj MFS	Free	22 August 2024	
10	FW	Nabib Newaj Jibon	Rahmatganj MFS	Released	22 August 2024	
1	GK	Shahidul Alam Sohel	Rahmatganj MFS	Released	22 August 2024	
32	FW	Md Sayed Hossain Sayem	Fakirerpool YMC	Free	22 August 2024	
2	DF	(Australia) Aaron Evans	(Maldives) Maziya S&RC	Free	14 September 2024	
12	FW	(Brazil) Washington Brandão	(Malaysia) Kelantan Darul Naim	Released	24 September 2024	
29	FW	Alamin Hossain Anaf	Free agent	Released	1 February 2025	
28	MF	Syed Arafat Tasin	Free agent	Released	1 February 2025	

=== Retained ===
No.	Pos	Player	Date	Source
7	MF	Rabiul Hasan	27 July 2024	
8	MF	Mohammad Ridoy	27 July 2024	
13	MF	Papon Singh	27 July 2024	
21	MF	Enamul Islam Gazi	27 July 2024	
22	GK	Md Shamim Hossen	27 July 2024	
24	DF	Assaduzzaman Bablu	27 July 2024	
33	DF	Shakir Ahmed	27 July 2024	
25	GK	Arifuzzaman Himel	22 August 2024	
28	MF	Sayed Arafat Hossain Tasin	22 August 2024	

== Competitions ==
Win Draw Loss Fixtures

=== Overall ===
Competition	First match	Last match	Final Position
BPL	30 November 2024	27 May 2025	Runners-up
Federation Cup	10 December 2024	29 April 2025	Runners-up

=== Overview ===
Competition	Record							
Competition	Pld	W	D	L	GF	GA	GD	Win %
BPL	18	10	5	3	31	8	+23	55.56
Federation Cup	6	4	2	0	11	2	+9	66.67
Total	24	14	7	3	42	10	+32	58.33

Source: Soccerway

=== Premier League ===
==== League table ====
Pos	Team	Pld	W	D	L	GF	GA	GD	Pts	Qualification or relegation
1	Mohammedan (Note: Mohammedan does not possess an AFC Challenge League licence.) (C)	18	13	3	2	46	16	+30	42	
2	Dhaka Abahani	18	10	5	3	31	8	+23	35	Qualification for the AFC Challenge League qualifying stage
3	Bashundhara Kings (W)	18	9	5	4	45	15	+30	32	Qualification for the AFC Challenge League qualifying stage (Note: as Federation Cup winners.)
4	Rahmatganj	18	9	3	6	39	25	+14	30	
5	Brothers Union	18	7	6	5	28	18	+10	27	

Source: Soccerway
Rules for classification: 1) Points; 2) Goal difference; 3) Goals scored.
(C) Champion; (W) Cup Winner

==== Results summary ====
Overall								Home						Away					
Pld	W	D	L	GF	GA	GD	Pts	W	D	L	GF	GA	GD	W	D	L	GF	GA	GD
18	10	5	3	31	8	+23	35	6	2	1	20	4	+16	4	3	2	11	4	+7

Source: Soccerway

==== Results by round ====
Round	1	2	3	4	5	6	7	8	9	10	11	12	13	14	15	16	17	18
Ground	A	H	A	H	H	A	A	A	A	H	A	H	A	A	H	H	H	H
Result	W	W	L	W	W	D	W	W	D	W	W	D	L	D	L	W	D	W
Position	4	3	5	2	3	3	2	2	2	2	2	2	2	2	2	2	2	2

Source: Matches
A = Away; H = Home; W = Win; D = Draw; L = Loss; P = Postponed

=== Matches ===
30 November 2024 1	Fakirerpool	0–2	Dhaka Abahani	Gazipur
14:30 BST (UTC+6)	Oduduwa (yellow card) 26'; Sumon (yellow card) 13'; Jakhonov (yellow card) 52'	Report	Enamul 71'; Jafar 90+6'	Stadium: Shaheed Barkat Stadium; Referee: Sabuj Das

7 December 2024 2	Dhaka Abahani	1–0	Dhaka Wanderers	Comilla
16:30 BST (UTC+6)	Jafar (yellow card) 34'; Reza 58'	Report	Emon (yellow card) 23'; Monir (yellow card) 41'; Sakib (yellow card) 82'	Stadium: Shaheed Dhirendranath Datta Stadium; Referee: Bituraj Barua

14 December 2024 3	Mohammedan	1–0	Dhaka Abahani	Comilla
16:30 BST (UTC+6)	Diabate (yellow card) 15' (goal) 45+2'; Sunday (yellow card) 57'; Mahbub (yellow card) 90+1'	Report	Hasan Murad (yellow card) 45'; Papon (yellow card) 59'; Rabiul (yellow card) 90+7'	Stadium: Shaheed Dhirendranath Datta Stadium; Referee: Md. Symoon Hasan Sany

20 December 2024 4	Dhaka Abahani	1–0	Bashundhara Kings	Comilla
16:30 BST (UTC+6)	Reza 3'; Mirajul (yellow card) 45+3'; Ridoy (yellow card) 54'	Report	Miguel (yellow card) 45+3'; Isaiah (yellow card) 66'; Jony (yellow card) 79'	Stadium: Shaheed Dhirendranath Datta Stadium; Referee: Mohammed Jalal Uddin

28 December 2024 5	Dhaka Abahani	2–0	Bangladesh Police	Comilla
16:30 BST (UTC+6)	Akash 23'; Yeasin (yellow card) 41'; Shakil (yellow card) 56'; Mitul (yellow card) 81'; Emon 88'	Report	Al-Amin (yellow card) 90+1'	Stadium: Shaheed Dhirendranath Datta Stadium; Referee: Mohammed Nasiruddin

3 January 2025 6	Fortis	0–0	Dhaka Abahani	Dhaka
16:45 BST (UTC+6)	Noyon (yellow card) 19'; Fahad (yellow card) 43'; Jumayev (yellow card) 90+1'	Report	Enamul (yellow card) 16'	Stadium: Bashundhara Kings Arena; Referee: Mahmud Zamal Farouqee Nahid

11 January 2025 7	Chittagong Abahani	0–4	Dhaka Abahani	Mymensingh
16:45 BST (UTC+6)	Saiful (yellow card) 25'; Diamond (yellow card) 64'	Report	Shakil (yellow card) 43'; Ibrahim 43', 66' (pen.); Mahdi (yellow card) 49'; Enamul 52'; Asadul 71'; Mirajul (yellow card) 88'	Stadium: Rafiq Uddin Bhuiyan Stadium; Referee: Sabuj Das

18 January 2025 8	Rahmatganj	0–1	Dhaka Abahani	Munshiganj
16:45 BST (UTC+6)	Arafat (yellow card) 80'; Oshie (yellow card) 90+4'	Report	Shakil (yellow card) 45' (goal) 68'; Pritom (yellow card) 90+4'	Stadium: Munshiganj Stadium; Referee: Alomgir Sarker

25 January 2025 9	Brothers Union	0–0	Dhaka Abahani	Munshiganj
16:45 BST (UTC+6)	Kawshik (yellow card) 12'; Eleta (yellow card) 35'; Monir (yellow card) 76'	Report	Shahin (yellow card) 54'	Stadium: Munshiganj Stadium; Referee: Md. Symoon Hasan Sany

22 February 2025 10	Dhaka Abahani	6–1	Fakirerpool	Comilla
17:00 BST (UTC+6)	Emon (yellow card) 21'; Ridoy 39'; Shakil (yellow card) 45+2'; Enamul 54', 61'; Mahdi (yellow card) 65'; Ibrahim 78'; Jafar 84'; Mirajul 90+2'	Report	Jintu (yellow card) 4'; Sayem 14'	Stadium: Shaheed Dhirendranath Datta Stadium; Referee: Bituraj Barua

12 April 2025 11	Dhaka Wanderers	1–4	Dhaka Abahani	Gazipur
17:30 BST (UTC+6)	Abid (yellow card) 33'; Sakib 55'	Report	Raphael 48', 83'; Reza 51'; Ridoy 57'	Stadium: Shaheed Barkat Stadium; Referee: Bituraj Barua

26 April 2025 12	Dhaka Abahani	0–0	Mohammedan	Comilla
17:30 BST (UTC+6)	Ibrahim (yellow card) 51'; Emeka (yellow card) 79'	Report	Diabate (yellow card) 32'; Mahbub (red card) 42'; Mithu (yellow card) 53'	Stadium: Shaheed Dhirendranath Datta Stadium; Referee: Md. Symoon Hasan Sany

2 May 2025 13	Bashundhara Kings	2–0	Dhaka Abahani	Dhaka
19:30 BST (UTC+6)	Fahim 16', 49'; Rimon (yellow card) 45+1'; Sohel (yellow card) 90+2' (red card) 90+9'; Saad (red card) 90+9'; Mehedi (yellow card) 90+9'	Report	Shahin (red card) 90+9'	Stadium: Bashundhara Kings Arena; Referee: Bhubon Mohon Tarafder

10 May 2025 14	Bangladesh Police	0–0	Dhaka Abahani	Mymensingh
18:00 BST (UTC+6)	Isa (yellow card) 45+4'; Dipok (yellow card) 56'; Anik (yellow card) 80'; Ismail (yellow card) 85'; Rabby (yellow card) 90+5'	Report	Yeasin (yellow card) 45+3'; Papon (yellow card) 50' (yellow-red card) 90+3'; Shakil (yellow card) 90+1'	Stadium: Rafiq Uddin Bhuiyan Stadium; Referee: Arisuz Rahman Sagor

17 May 2025 15	Dhaka Abahani	1–2	Fortis	Comilla
18:00 BST (UTC+6)	Raphael (yellow card) 33'; Reza (yellow card) 75'; Ridoy 80'; Sabuz (yellow card) 90+1'	Report	Pa Omar 19' (pen.); Noyon (yellow card) 20'; Essa (yellow card) 45+1' (goal) 77'; Sajib (red card) 75'	Stadium: Shaheed Dhirendranath Datta Stadium; Referee: Md. Symoon Hasan Sany

21 May 2025 16	Dhaka Abahani	5–0	Chittagong Abahani	Comilla
18:00 BST (UTC+6)	Emeka 20', 84'; Bablu 44'; Enamul 90+2'	Report	Sajon (yellow card) 37'; Rajbongshi (yellow card) 45+2'	Stadium: Shaheed Dhirendranath Datta Stadium; Referee: Jahid Hasan

24 May 2025 17	Dhaka Abahani	1–1	Rahmatganj MFS	Comilla
18:00 BST (UTC+6)	Reza (yellow card) 31'; Ogbugh 64'; Yeasin (yellow card) 67'; Emon (yellow card) 79'	Report	Rajon (yellow card) 65'; Boateng 74'	Stadium: Shaheed Dhirendranath Datta Stadium; Referee: Bituraj Barua

27 May 2025 18	Dhaka Abahani	3–0	Brothers Union	Comilla
18:00 BST (UTC+6)	Bablu 24' (yellow card) 79'; Raphael 51'; Mirajul 86'	Report	Mfon (yellow card) 79'	Stadium: Shaheed Dhirendranath Datta Stadium; Referee: Anisur Rahman

=== Federation Cup ===
Pos	Team	Pld	W	D	L	GF	GA	GD	Pts	Qualification
1	Dhaka Abahani	4	4	0	0	9	0	+9	12	Qualify for QRF 1
2	Rahmatganj MFS	4	3	0	1	10	2	+8	9	Advance to QRF 2
3	Mohammedan	4	2	0	2	11	4	+7	6	
4	Fakirerpool YMC	4	0	1	3	4	16	−12	1	
5	Chittagong Abahani	4	0	1	3	2	14	−12	1	

Source: Soccerway
Rules for classification: Group stages tiebreakers

10 December 2024 1	Dhaka Abahani	3–0	Chittagong Abahani	Cumilla
14:30 BST (UTC+6)	Reza 17'; Ibrahim 76'; Yeasin 87'	Report		Stadium: Shaheed Dhirendranath Datta Stadium; Referee: Jasim Akhter

7 January 2024 2	Dhaka Abahani	1–0	Mohammedan	Cumilla
14:30 BST (UTC+6)	Ibrahim 73'	Report		Stadium: Shaheed Dhirendranath Datta Stadium; Referee: Bituraj Barua

21 January 2024 3	Dhaka Abahani	2–0	Rahmatganj MFS	Cumilla
14:30 BST (UTC+6)	Gazi 12'; Ridoy 60'	Report		Stadium: Shaheed Dhirendranath Datta Stadium; Referee: SM Jasim Akhter

31 January 2024 4	Dhaka Abahani	3–0	Fakirerpool	Dhaka
14:30 BST (UTC+6)	Yeasin 65' (pen.); Murad 68'; Mahdi 71'	Report		Stadium: Bashundhara Kings Arena; Referee: Md Nasir Uddin

==== Qualification round ====
8 April 2024 1	Bashundhara Kings	1–1 (a.e.t.) (2–4 p)	Dhaka Abahani	Comilla
14:30 BST (UTC+6)	Rakib (yellow card) 9'; Daciel (yellow card) 12'; Jony 57'; Topu (yellow card) 83'	Report	Hasan Murad (yellow card) 16'; Ridoy (yellow card) 27'; Bablu (yellow card) ?' (yellow-red card); Akash 84'	Stadium: Shaheed Dhirendranath Datta Stadium; Referee: Md Symoon Hasan Sany

==== Final ====
22 & 29 April 2025 (Note: The final match was held on 22 April 2025, at 2:45 PM. But later, the match was temporarily suspended due to excessive rain and poor lighting at the end. The remainder of the match (second half of the extra-time) was later moved to 3:00 PM on 29 April 2025.)	Dhaka Abahani	1–1 (a.e.t.) (3–5 p)	Bashundhara Kings	Mymensingh
15:00 (Rescheduled) (Note: The initial starting time was 14:45 UTC on April 22.)	Augusto (yellow card) 11'; Mahdi (yellow card) 19'; Ibrahim 15'; Mirajul (yellow card) 42'; Shakil (yellow card) 42'	Report	Lescano 6'; Topu (yellow card) 24'; Sohel (yellow card) 28'; Mehedi (yellow card) 42'; Rimon (yellow card) 42'; Sohel (yellow card) 75'; Sadd (yellow card) 90+4'; Fahim (red card) 103'; Rakib (yellow card) 118'; Fernandes (yellow card) 120+3'	Stadium: Rafiq Uddin Bhuiyan Stadium; Referee: Saymoon Hasan Sany
	Penalties
	Augusto (penalty scored); Emeka (penalty missed); Sabuz (penalty scored); Mirajul (penalty scored)		(penalty scored) Fernandez; (penalty scored) Morsalin; (penalty scored) Insan; (penalty scored) Topu; (penalty scored) Daciel

== Statistics ==
=== Squad statistics ===
No.	Pos	Nat	Player	Total		BPL		Federation Cup	
No.	Pos	Nat	Player	Apps	Goals	Apps	Goals	Apps	Goals
1	GK	(Bangladesh)	Mahfuz Hasan Pritom	4	0	2+1	0	1	0
22	GK	(Bangladesh)	Shamim Hossen	0	0	0	0	0	0
25	GK	(Bangladesh)	Arifuzzaman Himel	0	0	0	0	0	0
30	GK	(Bangladesh)	Mitul Marma	21	0	14+1	0	6	0
2	DF	(Bangladesh)	Shahin Ahammad	7	0	3+1	0	0+3	0
3	DF	(Bangladesh)	Hasan Murad Tipu	17	1	10+1	0	6	1
4	DF	(Bangladesh)	Yeasin Khan	23	2	17+1	0	5	2
5	DF	(Bangladesh)	Shakil Hossain	20	1	9+5	1	4+2	0
14	DF	(Bangladesh)	Yeasin Arafat	2	0	2	0	0	0
15	DF	(Bangladesh)	Kamrul Islam	23	0	17+1	0	5	0
24	DF	(Bangladesh)	Assaduzzaman Bablu	20	2	15	2	5	0
33	DF	(Bangladesh)	Shakir Ahmed	3	0	0+3	0	0	0
44	DF	(Bangladesh)	Sabuz Hossain	12	0	5+4	0	0+3	0
7	MF	(Bangladesh)	Rabiul Hasan	9	0	3+4	0	1+1	0
8	MF	(Bangladesh)	Mohammad Ridoy	23	4	17	3	6	1
10	MF	(Brazil)	Raphael Augusto	10	4	8	4	2	0
9	FW	(Bangladesh)	Shahriar Emon	20	1	10+5	1	4+1	0
13	MF	(Bangladesh)	Papon Singh	10	0	8+1	0	1	0
16	MF	(Bangladesh)	Mahdi Yusuf Khan	14	1	7+2	0	3+2	1
21	MF	(Bangladesh)	Enamul Islam Gazi	21	6	10+7	5	3+1	1
27	MF	(Bangladesh)	Md Faizullah	2	0	0+1	0	0+1	0
35	MF	(Bangladesh)	Tonmoy Das	1	0	0	0	0+1	0
6	FW	(Nigeria)	Emeka Ogbugh	10	3	8	3	2	0
11	FW	(Bangladesh)	Jafar Iqbal	16	2	6+6	2	2+2	0
12	FW	(Bangladesh)	Arman Foysal Akash	11	2	2+6	1	1+2	1
19	FW	(Bangladesh)	Mohammad Ibrahim	22	6	13+3	3	5+1	3
17	FW	(Bangladesh)	Sarower Zaman Nipu	0	0	0	0	0	0
18	FW	(Bangladesh)	Md Meraj Pradhan	1	0	0+1	0	0	0
20	FW	(Bangladesh)	Sumon Reza	12	4	8+1	3	3	1
23	FW	(Bangladesh)	Mirajul Islam	14	2	3+6	2	0+5	0
26	FW	(Bangladesh)	Asadul Molla	10	1	1+7	1	1+1	0
34	FW	(Bangladesh)	Aminur Rahman Sajib	1	0	0+1	0	0	0
Players who left during the season
28	MF	(Bangladesh)	Syed Arafat Tasin	0	0	0	0	0	0
29	FW	(Bangladesh)	Alamin Hossain Anaf	0	0	0	0	0	0

Source: Soccerway

=== Goalscorers ===
Rank	No.	Pos.	Nat.	Player	BPL	Federation Cup	Total
1	21	MF	(Bangladesh)	Enamul Islam Gazi	5	1	6
1	19	FW	(Bangladesh)	Mohammad Ibrahim	3	3	6
3	10	MF	(Brazil)	Raphael Augusto	4	0	4
3	8	MF	(Bangladesh)	Mohammad Ridoy	3	1	4
3	20	FW	(Bangladesh)	Sumon Reza	3	1	4
6	6	FW	(Nigeria)	Emeka Ogbugh	3	0	3
7	11	FW	(Bangladesh)	Jafar Iqbal	2	0	2
7	24	DF	(Bangladesh)	Assaduzzaman Bablu	2	0	2
7	4	DF	(Bangladesh)	Yeasin Khan	0	2	2
7	23	FW	(Bangladesh)	Mirajul Islam	2	0	2
7	12	FW	(Bangladesh)	Arman Foysal Akash	1	1	2
11	3	DF	(Bangladesh)	Hasan Murad Tipu	0	1	1
11	5	DF	(Bangladesh)	Shakil Hossain	1	0	1
11	9	FW	(Bangladesh)	Shahriar Emon	1	0	1
11	16	MF	(Bangladesh)	Mahdi Yusuf Khan	0	1	1
11	26	FW	(Bangladesh)	Asadul Molla	1	0	0
Total					31	11	42

Source: Matches

=== Assists ===
Rank	No.	Pos.	Nat.	Player	BPL	Federation Cup	Total
1	9	FW	(Bangladesh)	Shahriar Emon	3	2	5
1	23	FW	(Bangladesh)	Mirajul Islam	3	0	3
1	6	FW	(Nigeria)	Emeka Ogbugh	2	1	3
1	19	DF	(Bangladesh)	Kamrul Islam	2	1	3
1	21	MF	(Bangladesh)	Enamul Islam Gazi	2	1	3
6	10	MF	(Brazil)	Raphael Augusto	2	0	2
6	8	MF	(Bangladesh)	Mohammad Ridoy	1	1	2
6	19	FW	(Bangladesh)	Mohammad Ibrahim	1	1	2
9	7	MF	(Bangladesh)	Rabiul Hasan	1	0	1
9	24	DF	(Bangladesh)	Assaduzzaman Bablu	1	0	1
9	11	FW	(Bangladesh)	Jafar Iqbal	1	0	1
9	2	DF	(Bangladesh)	Shahin Ahammad	1	0	1
9	3	DF	(Bangladesh)	Hasan Murad Tipu	0	1	1
9	26	MF	(Bangladesh)	Asadul Molla	0	1	1
Total					20	9	29

Source: Soccerway
