= 2024–25 Federation Cup (Bangladesh) =

36th season of the Bangladesh Federation Cup

২০২৪–২৫ ফেডারেশন কাপ

Tournament details
- Host country: Bangladesh
- City: 3
- Dates: 3 December 2024– 29 April 2025
- Teams: 10
- Venues: 3 (in 3 host cities)

Final positions
- Champions: Bashundhara Kings (4th title)
- Runners-up: Dhaka Abahani

Tournament statistics
- Matches played: 24
- Goals scored: 74 (3.08 per match)
- Top scorer: 7 players (3 goals each)
- Best player(s): (Bangladesh) Topu Barman (Bashundhara Kings)
- Best goalkeeper: (Bangladesh) Mitul Marma (Abahani Limited Dhaka)
- Fair play award: Dhaka Abahani

The 2024–25 Federation Cup (also known as Bashundhara Group Federation Cup 2024–25 for sponsorship reasons) was the 36th edition of the tournament, the main domestic annual top-tier club football competition in Bangladesh organized by Bangladesh Football Federation. It was played from 3 December 2024 to 29 April 2025. There were ten participants in the tournament.

Bashundhara Kings are the current champions having defeated Abahani Limited Dhaka in the final on 29 April 2025. They qualified for 2025–26 AFC Challenge League preliminary stage and the 2025 Bangladesh Challenge Cup.

== Participating teams ==
The following ten clubs were participated in the tournament.

Team	Appearances	Previous best performance
Bangladesh Police	6th	Runners-up (1975)
Bashundhara Kings	6th	Champions (2019–20, 2020–21, 2023–24)
Brothers Union	34th	Champions (1980, 1991, 2005)
Chittagong Abahani	14th	Runners-up (2017)
Dhaka Abahani	36th	Champions (1982, 1985, 1986, 1988, 1997, 1999, 2000, 2010, 2016, 2017, 2018, 2021–22)
Mohammedan SC	36th	Champions (1980, 1981, 1982, 1983, 1987, 1989, 1995, 2002, 2008, 2009, 2022–23)
Fortis FC	3rd	Group stages (2022–23)
Rahmatganj MFS	36th	Runners-up (2019–20, 2021–22)
Dhaka Wanderers	2nd	Runners-up (1987)
Fakirerpool YMC	1st	TBC

== Venues ==
The matches were played at these three venues across the country.

Comilla	Dhaka	Mymensingh
Shaheed Dhirendranath Datta Stadium	Bashundhara Kings Arena	Rafiq Uddin Bhuiyan Stadium
Capacity: 18,000	Capacity: 6,000	Capacity: 25,000
2024–25 Federation Cup (Bangladesh) is located in Bangladesh

== Draw ==
The draw ceremony of the tournament was held on 20 November 2024 15:00 BST at 3rd floor of BFF house Motijheel, Dhaka Bangladesh. The ten clubs were divided into two groups, top two group winners & runners-up form each group will qualify in the next round.

== Group summary ==
Group A	Group B
Bashundhara Kings	Dhaka Mohammedan
Bangladesh Police	Dhaka Abahani
Fortis FC	Chittagong Abahani
Brothers Union	Rahmatganj MFS
Dhaka Wanderers	Fakirerpool YMC

== Round Matches Dates ==
Phase	Date
Group stages	3 December 2024 – 4 February 2025
QRF	8 –15 April 2025
Final	22 and 29 April 2025 (Note: The final match was held on 22 April 2025, at 2:45 PM. The match was suspended due to excessive rain and poor lighting. The remainder of the match recommenced at 3:00 PM on 29 April 2025.)

== Match officials ==
The following officials were chosen for the competition.

Referees

- (Bangladesh) Mahaud Zamal Farooque Nahid
- (Bangladesh) Golam Mourshed Chowdhury Nayon
- (Bangladesh) Saymoon Hasan Sany
- (Bangladesh) Md Jalal Uddin
- (Bangladesh) Bituraj Barua
- (Bangladesh) Sabuj Kumar Das
- (Bangladesh) SM Jasim Akhter
- (Bangladesh) Md Alamgir Sarker
- (Bangladesh) Md Nazmul Huda
- (Bangladesh) Taposh Roy
- (Bangladesh) Anisur Rahman Sagor
- (Bangladesh) Md Nasir Uddin
- (Bangladesh) Md Abul Kalam Rumon
- (Bangladesh) Bhubon Mohon Tarofder

Assistant Referees

- (Bangladesh) Mahmud Hasan Mamun
- (Bangladesh) Sujoy Barua
- (Bangladesh) Md Khorshed Alam
- (Bangladesh) Md Shah Alam
- (Bangladesh) Md Nuruzzaman
- (Bangladesh) Sharifuzzaman Tipu
- (Bangladesh) Rasel Mahmud
- (Bangladesh) Sheikh Iqbal Alam
- (Bangladesh) Robin Khan
- (Bangladesh) Bikash Sarker
- (Bangladesh) Md Tarikul Islam
- (Bangladesh) Md Nafiz Sarkar
- (Bangladesh) Bayezid Mondol
- (Bangladesh) Md Monir Ahmmad Dhali
- (Bangladesh) Ahmed Rafshan Jani

== Group stages ==
Key to colours in group tables
Group winners will qualify for QRF 1.
Group runners-ups will advance to QRF 2.

Tiebreakers
The ranking of teams in the group stage was determined as follows:
1. Points obtained in all group matches:
  - Win: 3 points;
  - Draw: 1 point;
  - Loss: 0 points;
2. Head to head result.
3. Goal difference in all group matches;
4. Number of goals scored in all group matches.

=== Group A ===
Pos	Team	Pld	W	D	L	GF	GA	GD	Pts	Qualification
1	Bashundhara Kings	4	3	0	1	9	4	+5	9	Qualified for QRF 1
2	Brothers Union	4	2	1	1	9	1	+8	7	Advanced to QRF 2
3	Fortis	4	2	1	1	5	1	+4	7	
4	Bangladesh Police	4	1	2	1	4	4	0	5	
5	Dhaka Wanderers	4	0	0	4	1	18	−17	0	

Source: Soccerway
3 December 2024
14:30
Match 1

Bashundhara Kings	1–0	Brothers Union
Topu 69'	Report

Shaheed Dhirendranath Datta Stadium, Cumilla
Referee: Golam Mourshed Chowdhury Nayon
Man of the Match: Topu Barman (Bashundhara Kings)
3 December 2024
14:30
Match 2

Bangladesh Police	0–0	Fortis
	Report

Rafiq Uddin Bhuiyan Stadium, Mymensingh
Referee: Mahmud Zamal Farouqee Nahid
Man of the Match: Rakibul Islam Tushar (Bangladesh Police)

17 December 2024
14:30
Match 5

Bashundhara Kings	0–2	Fortis
	Report	Jasur Jumaev 72'; Abdullah 80'

Bashundhara Kings Arena, Dhaka
Referee: Md Alamgir Sarker
Man of the Match: Mohammad Abdullah (Fortis)
17 December 2024
14:30
Match 6

Brothers Union	8–0	Dhaka Wanderers
Rabbi 8'; Mustapha Drammeh 24', 65', 70'; Sazzad 28', 48', 81'; Kingsley 90+3'	Report

Rafiq Uddin Bhuiyan Stadium, Mymensingh
Referee: Md Nazmul Huda
Man of the Match: Sazzad Hossain (Brothers Union)

31 December 2024
14:30
Match 9

Fortis	3–0	Dhaka Wanderers
Joy Kumar 45+2', 75'; Nova 89'	Report

Shaheed Dhirendranath Datta Stadium, Cumilla
Referee: Md Jalal Uddin
Man of the Match: Joy Kumar (Fortis)
31 December 2024
14:30
Match 10

Bangladesh Police	2–3	Bashundhara Kings
Al Amin 7', 54'	Report	Topu 6'; Miguel 10'; Fernandes 53'

Bashundhara Kings Arena, Dhaka
Referee: Jasim Akhter
Man of the Match: Miguel Figueira (Bashundhara Kings)

14 January 2025
14:30
Match 13

Bangladesh Police	2–1	Dhaka Wanderers
M. Rabby 84'; Esanur Rahman 86'	Report	Emon 42' (pen.)

Bashundhara Kings Arena, Dhaka
Referee: Anisur Rahman Sagor
Man of the Match: Mannaf Rabby (Bangladesh Police)
14 January 2025
14:30
Match 14

Brothers Union	1–0	Fortis FC
Rabbi 35'	Report

Shaheed Dhirendranath Datta Stadium, Cumilla
Referee: Md Jalal Uddin
Man of the Match: Ashraful Islam Rana (Brothers Union)

28 January 2025
14:45
Match 17

Bangladesh Police	0–0	Brothers Union
	Report

Rafiq Uddin Bhuiyan Stadium, Mymensingh
Referee: Md Nasir Uddin
Man of the Match: Rakibul Islam Tushar (Bangladesh Police)
28 January 2025
14:45
Match 18

Bashundhara Kings	5–0	Dhaka Wanderers
Miguel 18'; Sohel Sr. 40'; Rasel 55' (o.g.); Sohel Jr. 70'; Topu 77'	Report

Shaheed Dhirendranath Datta Stadium, Cumilla
Referee: Bhubon Mohon Torafder
Man of the Match: Topu Barman (Bashundhara Kings)

=== Group B ===
Pos	Team	Pld	W	D	L	GF	GA	GD	Pts	Qualification
1	Dhaka Abahani	4	4	0	0	9	0	+9	12	Qualify for QRF 1
2	Rahmatganj MFS	4	3	0	1	10	2	+8	9	Advance to QRF 2
3	Mohammedan	4	2	0	2	11	4	+7	6	
4	Fakirerpool YMC	4	0	1	3	4	16	−12	1	
5	Chittagong Abahani	4	0	1	3	2	14	−12	1	

Source: Soccerway
10 December 2024
14:30
Match 3

Mohammedan	0–1	Rahmatganj
	Report	Rajon 82'

Bashundhara Kings Arena, Dhaka
Referee: Bituraj Barua
Man of the Match: Rajon Howladar (Rahmatganj)
10 December 2024
14:30
Match 4

Dhaka Abahani	3–0	Chittagong Abahani
Sumon 17'; Ibrahim 76'; Yeasin 87'	Report

Shaheed Dhirendranath Datta Stadium, Cumilla
Referee: Jasim Akhter
Man of the Match: Mohammad Ibrahim (Dhaka Abahani)

24 December 2024
14:30
Match 7

Dhaka Mohammedan	6–0	Chittagong Abahani
Muzaffarov 11'; Diabate 15'; Arif Hossain 53'; Raju Ahmed Zisan 69'; Sourav Dewan 78'; Md Jewel Mia 81'	Report

Bashundhara Kings Arena, Dhaka
Referee: Mahaud Zamal Farooque Nahid
Man of the Match: Raju Ahmed Zisan (Dhaka Mohammedan)
24 December 2024
14:30
Match 8

Rahmatganj	6–0	Fakirerpool
Maraz 12'; Jibon 45+3', 57', 76'; Boateng 53'; Mohammed Toha 90+3'	Report

Rafiq Uddin Bhuiyan Stadium, Mymensingh
Referee: Md Alamgir Sarker
Man of the Match: Nabib Newaj Jibon (Rahmatganj)

7 January 2025
14:30
Match 11

Chittagong Abahani	2–2	Fakirerpool
Saiful Islam 12'; Sabuz 80'	Report	Turaev 21'; Shanto Tudo 73'

Rafiq Uddin Bhuiyan Stadium, Mymensingh
Referee: Taposh Roy
Man of the Match: Shanto Tudo (Fakirerpool)
7 January 2025
14:30
Match 12

Dhaka Abahani	1–0	Mohammedan
Ibrahim 73'	Report

Shaheed Dhirendranath Datta Stadium, Cumilla
Referee: Bituraj Barua
Man of the Match: Mohammad Ibrahim (Dhaka Abahani)

21 January 2025
14:30
Match 15

Dhaka Abahani	3–0	Fakirerpool
Yeasin 65' (pen.); Murad 68'; Mahdi Yusuf Khan 71'	Report

Shaheed Dhirendranath Datta Stadium, Cumilla
Referee: Md Nasir Uddin
Man of the Match: Mahdi Yusuf Khan (Dhaka Abahani)
21 January 2025
14:30
Match 16

Chittagong Abahani	0–3	Rahmatganj
	Report	Kahraba 32'; Boateng 42'; Mohammed Toha 70'

Bashundhara Kings Arena, Dhaka
Referee: Md Abul Kalamm Rumon
Man of the Match: Mostafa Kahraba (Rahmatganj)

31 January 2025
14:30
Match 19

Dhaka Abahani	2–0	Rahmatganj
Gazi 12'; Ridoy 60'	Report

Bashundhara Kings Arena, Dhaka
Referee: SM Jasim Akhter
Man of the Match: Mohammad Ridoy (Dhaka Abahani)
31 January 2025
14:30
Match 20

Fakirerpool	2–5	Mohammedan
Rafayel Tudu 35'; Turaev 40' (pen.)	Report	Moin 10', 27'; Raju Ahmed Zisan 72'; Arif Hossain 81', 84'

Rafiq Uddin Bhuiyan Stadium, Mymensingh
Referee: Sabuj Kumar Das
Man of the Match: Moinul Islam Moin (Dhaka Mohammedan)

== Knockout stages ==
=== Round dates and venues ===
All matches were played at neutral venues.

Round	Date	Venues
QRF 1	8 April 2025	Shaheed Dhirendranath Datta Stadium, Cumilla
QRF 2	8 April 2025	Rafiq Uddin Bhuiyan Stadium, Mymensingh
QRF 3	15 April 2025	Bashundhara Kings Arena, Dhaka
Final	22 and 29 April 2025	Rafiq Uddin Bhuiyan Stadium, Mymensingh

=== Bracket ===
QRF 1
A1	Bashundhara Kings	1 (2)
B1	Dhaka Abahani (p)	1 (4)
QRF 2
A2	Brothers Union	1
B2	Rahmatganj MFS (a.e.t.)	2

QRF 3
A1	Bashundhara Kings (a.e.t.)	2
B2	Rahmatganj MFS	1

Final
B1	Dhaka Abahani	1 (3)
A1	Bashundhara Kings (p)	1 (5)

=== Matches ===
8 April 2025 QR1	Bashundhara Kings	1–1 (a.e.t.) (2–4 p)	Dhaka Abahani	Cumilla
14:45	Jony 57'	Report	Akash 84'	Stadium: Shaheed Dhirendranath Datta Stadium; Referee: Md Symoon Hasan Sany
	Penalties
	Fernandes (penalty scored); Morsalin (penalty scored); Rahul (penalty missed); Daciel (penalty missed)		(penalty missed) Jafar; (penalty scored) Augusto; (penalty scored) Emeka; (penalty scored) Sabuz; (penalty scored) Ibrahim

8 April 2025 QR2	Brothers Union	1–2 (a.e.t.)	Rahmatganj	Mymensingh
14:45	Udoh 35'	Report	Boateng 62'; Solomon King Kanform 99'	Stadium: Rafiq Uddin Bhuiyan Stadium; Referee: Md Nasir Uddin; Man of the Match: Solomon King Kanform (Rahmatganj)

15 April 2025 QR3	Bashundhara Kings	2–1 (a.e.t.)	Rahmatganj MFS	Dhaka
14:45	Rakib 82'; Md Insan Hossain 113'	Report	Solomon King Kanform 75'	Stadium: Bashundhara Kings Arena; Referee: Md Jalal Uddin; Man of the Match: Md Saad Uddin (Bashundhara Kings)

=== Final ===
22 and 29 April 2025
15:00

Dhaka Abahani	1–1 (a.e.t.)	Bashundhara Kings
Ibrahim 15'	Report	Lescano 6'
Penalties
Augusto (penalty scored); Emeka (penalty missed); Sabuz (penalty scored); Mirajul (penalty scored)	3–5	(penalty scored) Fernandez; (penalty scored) Morsalin; (penalty scored) Md Insan Hossain; (penalty scored) Topu; (penalty scored) Daciel

Rafiq Uddin Bhuiyan Stadium, Mymensingh
Referee: Saymoon Hasan Sany
Man of the Match: Mehedi Hasan Srabon (Bashundhara Kings)

== Winners ==
36th Federation Cup (Bangladesh) 2024–25
Winners
Bashundhara Kings
Fourth Titles

== Statistics ==
=== Goalscorers ===
There have been 74 goals scored in 24 matches, for an average of 3.08 goals per match.

3 goals

- (Bangladesh) Topu Barman (Bashundhara Kings)
- (The Gambia) Mustapha Drammeh (Brothers Union)
- (Bangladesh) Sazzad Hossain (Brothers Union)
- (Bangladesh) Arif Hossain (Dhaka Mohammedan)
- (Bangladesh) Nabib Newaj Jibon (Rahmatganj MFS)
- (Ghana) Samuel Boateng (Rahmatganj MFS)
- (Bangladesh) Mohammad Ibrahim (Dhaka Abahani)

2 goals

- (Brazil) Miguel Figueira (Bashundhara Kings)
- Al Amin (Bangladesh Police)
- (Bangladesh) Kawsar Ali Rabbi (Brothers Union)
- (Bangladesh) Yeasin Khan (Dhaka Abahani)
- (Bangladesh) Joy Kumar (Fortis FC)
- (Uzbekistan) Akobir Turaev (Fakirerpool YMC)
- (Bangladesh) Raju Ahmed Zisan (Dhaka Mohammedan)
- (Bangladesh) Moinul Islam Moin (Dhaka Mohammedan)
- (Bangladesh) Mohammed Toha (Rahmatganj MFS)
- (The Gambia) Solomon King Kanform (Rahmatganj MFS)

1 goal

- (Bangladesh) Sohel Rana Sr. (Bashundhara Kings)
- (Bangladesh) Sohel Rana Jr. (Bashundhara Kings)
- (Brazil) Fernandes (Bashundhara Kings)
- (Bangladesh) Mojibur Rahman Jony (Bashundhara Kings)
- (Bangladesh) Md Insan Hossain (Bashundhara Kings)
- (Bangladesh) Rakib Hossain (Bashundhara Kings)
- (Argentina) Juan Lescano (Bashundhara Kings)
- Esanur Rahman (Bangladesh Police)
- Mannaf Rabby (Bangladesh Police)
- (Bangladesh) Eleta Kingsley (Brothers Union)
- (Nigeria) Mfon Udoh (Brothers Union)
- (Bangladesh) Saiful Islam (Chittagong Abahani)
- (Bangladesh) Tawhidul Alam Sabuz (Chittagong Abahani)
- (Bangladesh) Sumon Reza (Dhaka Abahani)
- (Bangladesh) Hasan Murad Tipu (Dhaka Abahani)
- (Bangladesh) Mahdi Yusuf Khan (Dhaka Abahani)
- (Bangladesh) Enamul Islam Gazi (Dhaka Abahani)
- (Bangladesh) Mohammad Ridoy (Dhaka Abahani)
- (Bangladesh) Arman Foysal Akash (Dhaka Abahani)
- (Bangladesh) Mohammad Emon (Dhaka Wanderers)
- (Mali) Souleymane Diabate (Dhaka Mohammedan)
- (Uzbekistan) Muzaffar Muzaffarov (Dhaka Mohammedan)
- (Bangladesh) Md Jewel Mia (Dhaka Mohammedan)
- (Bangladesh) Sourav Dewan (Dhaka Mohammedan)
- (Bangladesh) Mohammad Abdullah (Fortis FC)
- (Bangladesh) Piash Ahmed Nova (Fortis FC)
- (Uzbekistan) Jasur Jumaev (Fortis FC)
- (Bangladesh) Shanto Tudo (Fakirerpool YMC)
- (Bangladesh) Rafayel Tudu (Fakirerpool YMC)
- (Bangladesh) Rajon Howladar (Rahmatganj MFS)
- (Bangladesh) Maraz Hossain (Rahmatganj MFS)
- (Egypt) Mostafa Kahraba (Rahmatganj MFS)

Source: Soccerway

Own goals

† Bold Club indicates winner of the match

Player	Club	Opponent	Result	Date
(Bangladesh) Nazmul Islam Rasel	Dhaka Wanderers	Bashundhara Kings	0–5	28 January 2025

=== Hat-tricks ===
† Bold Club indicates winner of the match

Player	For	Against	Result	Date	Ref
(Bangladesh) Sazzad Hossain	Brothers Union	Dhaka Wanderers	8–0	17 December 2024	
(The Gambia) Mustapha Drammeh	Brothers Union	Dhaka Wanderers	8–0	17 December 2024	
(Bangladesh) Nabib Newaj Jibon	Rahmatganj MFS	Fakirerpool YMC	6–0	24 December 2024	

== Individual awards ==
=== Man of the match ===
Group stage

† Bold club indicates winner of the match

Match day	Group	Match no.	Player	Club	Opponent
1	A	1	(Bangladesh) Topu Barman	Bashundhara Kings	Brothers Union
1	A	2	(Bangladesh) Rakibul Islam Tushar	Bangladesh Police FC	Fortis FC
2	B	3	(Bangladesh) Mohammad Ibrahim	Dhaka Abahani	Chittagong Abahani
2	B	4	(Bangladesh) Rajon Howladar	Rahmatganj MFS	Mohammedan SC
3	A	5	(Bangladesh) Mohammad Abdullah	Fortis FC	Bashundhara Kings
3	A	6	(Bangladesh) Sazzad Hossain	Brothers Union	Dhaka Wanderers
4	B	7	(Bangladesh) Raju Ahmed	Dhaka Mohammedan	Chittagong Abahani
4	B	8	(Bangladesh) Nabib Newaj Jibon	Rahmatganj MFS	Fakirerpool YMC
5	A	9	(Brazil) Miguel Figueira	Bashundhara Kings	Bangladesh Police FC
5	A	10	(Bangladesh) Joy Kumar	Fortis FC	Dhaka Wanderers
6	B	11	(Bangladesh) Shanto Tudo	Fakirerpool YMC	Chittagong Abahani
6	B	12	(Bangladesh) Mohammad Ibrahim (2)	Dhaka Abahani	Dhaka Mohammedan
7	A	13	(Bangladesh) Ashraful Islam Rana	Brothers Union	Fortis FC
7	A	14	(Bangladesh) Mannaf Rabby	Bangladesh Police	Dhaka Wanderers
8	B	15	(Bangladesh) Mahdi Yusuf Khan	Dhaka Abahani	Fakirerpool YMC
8	B	16	(Egypt) Mostafa Kahraba	Rahmatganj MFS	Chittagong Abahani
9	A	17	(Bangladesh) Topu Barman (2)	Bashundhara Kings	Dhaka Wanderers
9	A	18	(Bangladesh) Rakibul Islam Tushar (2)	Bangladesh Police FC	Brothers Union
10	B	19	(Bangladesh) Mohammad Ridoy	Dhaka Abahani	Rahmatganj MFS
10	B	20	(Bangladesh) Moinul Islam Moin	Dhaka Mohammedan	Fakirerpool YMC

Knockout stage

Round	Match no.	Player	Club	Opponent
QRF 1	21	(Bangladesh) Mitul Marma	Dhaka Abahani	Bashundhara Kings
QRF 2	22	(The Gambia) Solomon King Kanform	Rahmatganj MFS	Brothers Union
QRF 3	23	(Bangladesh) Md Saad Uddin	Bashundhara Kings	Rahmatganj MFS
Final	24	(Bangladesh) Mehedi Hasan Srabon	Bashundhara Kings	Dhaka Abahani

== Best Player Awards ==
Best Player	Top Goalscorer	Best Goalkeeper	Fair Play Award
(Bangladesh) Topu Barman (Bashundhara Kings)	7 players	(Bangladesh) Mitul Marma (Dhaka Abahani)	Dhaka Abahani

== See also ==
- 2024 Bangladesh Challenge Cup
- 2024–25 Bangladesh Premier League
