= 2024–25 Federation Cup (Bangladesh) Group B =

Group B of the 2024–25 Federation Cup took place from 10 December 2024 to 4 February 2025. The group consisted runners-up of previous tournaments Dhaka Mohammedan, Dhaka Abahani, Chittagong Abahani, Rahmatganj MFS and Fakirerpool YMC. The top two teams, Dhaka Abahani and Rahmatganj MFS, advanced to the qualification round to the final.

== Teams ==
Draw position	Team	Appearances	Previous best performance
B1	Mohammedan SC	36th	Champions (1980, 1981, 1982, 1983, 1987, 1989, 1995, 2002, 2008, 2009, 2022–23)
B2	Abahani Limited Dhaka	36th	Champions (1982, 1985, 1986, 1988, 1997, 1999, 2000, 2010, 2016, 2017, 2018, 2021–22)
B3	Chittagong Abahani	14th	Runners-up (2017)
B4	Rahmatganj MFS	36th	Runners-up (2019–20, 2021–22)
B5	Fakirerpool YMC	TBC	TBC

== Standings ==
Pos	Team	Pld	W	D	L	GF	GA	GD	Pts	Qualification
1	Dhaka Abahani	4	4	0	0	9	0	+9	12	Qualify for QRF 1
2	Rahmatganj MFS	4	3	0	1	10	2	+8	9	Advance to QRF 2
3	Mohammedan	4	2	0	2	11	4	+7	6	
4	Fakirerpool YMC	4	0	1	3	4	16	−12	1	
5	Chittagong Abahani	4	0	1	3	2	14	−12	1	

Source: Soccerway
Rules for classification: Group stages tiebreakers

== Venues ==
The matches are being played at these three venues across the country.

Cumilla	Dhaka	Mymensingh
Shaheed Dhirendranath Datta Stadium	Bashundhara Kings Arena	Rafiq Uddin Bhuiyan Stadium
Capacity: 18,000	Capacity: 6,000	Capacity: 25,000
Matches: 3	Matches: 5	Matches: 2
2024–25 Federation Cup (Bangladesh) Group B is located in Bangladesh

== Matches ==
10 December 2024
14:30
Match 3

Mohammedan	0–1	Rahmatganj
	Report	Rajon 82'

Bashundhara Kings Arena, Dhaka
Referee: Bituraj Barua
Man of the Match: Rajon Howladar (Rahmatganj)
10 December 2024
14:30
Match 4

Dhaka Abahani	3–0	Chittagong Abahani
Sumon 17'; Ibrahim 76'; Yeasin 87'	Report

Shaheed Dhirendranath Datta Stadium, Cumilla
Referee: Jasim Akhter
Man of the Match: Mohammad Ibrahim (Dhaka Abahani)

24 December 2024
14:30
Match 7

Dhaka Mohammedan	6–0	Chittagong Abahani
Muzaffarov 11'; Diabate 15'; Arif Hossain 53'; Raju Ahmed Zisan 69'; Sourav Dewan 78'; Md Jewel Mia 81'	Report

Bashundhara Kings Arena, Dhaka
Referee: Mahaud Zamal Farooque Nahid
Man of the Match: Raju Ahmed Zisan (Dhaka Mohammedan)
24 December 2024
14:30
Match 8

Rahmatganj	6–0	Fakirerpool
Maraz 12'; Jibon 45+3', 57', 76'; Boateng 53'; Mohammed Toha 90+3'	Report

Rafiq Uddin Bhuiyan Stadium, Mymensingh
Referee: Md Alamgir Sarker
Man of the Match: Nabib Newaj Jibon (Rahmatganj)

7 January 2025
14:30
Match 11

Chittagong Abahani	2–2	Fakirerpool
Saiful Islam 12'; Sabuz 80'	Report	Turaev 21'; Shanto Tudo 73'

Rafiq Uddin Bhuiyan Stadium, Mymensingh
Referee: Taposh Roy
Man of the Match: Shanto Tudo (Fakirerpool)
7 January 2025
14:30
Match 12

Dhaka Abahani	1–0	Mohammedan
Ibrahim 73'	Report

Shaheed Dhirendranath Datta Stadium, Cumilla
Referee: Bituraj Barua
Man of the Match: Mohammad Ibrahim (Dhaka Abahani)

21 January 2025
14:30
Match 15

Dhaka Abahani	3–0	Fakirerpool
Yeasin 65' (pen.); Murad 68'; Mahdi Yusuf Khan 71'	Report

Shaheed Dhirendranath Datta Stadium, Cumilla
Referee: Md Nasir Uddin
Man of the Match: Mahdi Yusuf Khan (Dhaka Abahani)
21 January 2025
14:30
Match 16

Chittagong Abahani	0–3	Rahmatganj
	Report	Kahraba 32'; Boateng 42'; Mohammed Toha 70'

Bashundhara Kings Arena, Dhaka
Referee: Md Abul Kalamm Rumon
Man of the Match: Mostafa Kahraba (Rahmatganj)

31 January 2025
14:30
Match 19

Dhaka Abahani	2–0	Rahmatganj
Gazi 12'; Ridoy 60'	Report

Bashundhara Kings Arena, Dhaka
Referee: SM Jasim Akhter
Man of the Match: Mohammad Ridoy (Dhaka Abahani)
31 January 2025
14:30
Match 20

Fakirerpool	2–5	Mohammedan
Rafayel Tudu 35'; Turaev 40' (pen.)	Report	Moin 10', 27'; Raju Ahmed Zisan 72'; Arif Hossain 81', 84'

Rafiq Uddin Bhuiyan Stadium, Mymensingh
Referee: Sabuj Kumar Das
Man of the Match: Moinul Islam Moin (Dhaka Mohammedan)

== See also ==
- 2024–25 Federation Cup (Bangladesh) Group A
