= 2026–27 City Club (football) season =

City Club (football) 2026–27 football season

City Club
2026–27 season
- President: Md Tareque Al Mamun
- Head coach: Md Mahabubul Haque Juwel
- Stadium: City Club Ground, Mirpur
- Football League: TBD
- Federation Cup: TBD
Home colours	Away colours

The 2026–27 season is City Club's 54th season in existence and 1st season in the Bangladesh Football League. In addition to the domestic league, City Club (football) will participate in this season's Federation Cup. The season covers the period from 1 June 2026 to April 2027.

== Current squad ==
As of 25 January 2026

Note: Flags indicate national team as defined under FIFA eligibility rules; some limited exceptions apply. Players may hold more than one non-FIFA nationality.

No.	Pos.	Nation	Player
1	GK	BAN	Ashraful Islam
2	DF	BAN	Md Rakib Hossain
3	DF	ARG	Crusini
4	DF	BAN	Apu Ahmed (Captain)
5	DF	BAN	Mobinur Rashid
6	MF	BAN	Md Shofiqul Islam
8	MF	BAN	Md Mijanur Rahman
10	FW	BAN	Md Rana
11	FW	BAN	Md Ranju Sikder
13	GK	BAN	Md Saddam Hossain
14	MF	BAN	Md Al Amin Kagozi
16	DF	BAN	Ushaching Marma
19	MF	BAN	Md Nijam Uddin Raju
20	FW	BAN	Touhidul Islam
21	DF	BAN	Md Nasim Hossen

No.	Pos.	Nation	Player
22	GK	BAN	Md Rajib Islam
23	MF	BAN	Md Saiful Hossain
25	MF	BAN	Md Imon Ali Sheikh
26	FW	BAN	Md Habibullah Bashar
27	MF	BAN	Md Owskurun Ahmed Rohan
29	MF	BAN	Md Ridoy Hawlader
30	MF	BAN	Md Tanjilur Islam Antu
31	GK	BAN	Md Nehal
32	MF	BAN	Mohammed Eusha Bin Khalek
40	FW	BAN	Abrar Hoque Ayan
44	FW	BAN	Raiyanul Haque
50	FW	BAN	Md Afroz Ali
80	FW	BAN	Sahed Miah
99	FW	BAN	Md Masum Mia

== Transfer ==
=== In ===
Pos	Player	Previous club	Fee	Date	Source
MF	(The Gambia) Solomon King Kanform	Rahmatganj MFS	Free Transfer	25 June 2026	
FW	(Nigeria) Onyekachi Okafor	(Bangladesh) Fortis FC	Free Transfer	20 July 2026	
DF	(Bangladesh) Noyon Mia	(Bangladesh) Fortis FC	Free Transfer	23 July 2026	
MF	(Bangladesh) Md Farhad Mona	(Bangladesh) Fortis FC	Free Transfer	23 July 2026	
FW	(Bangladesh) Piash Ahmed Nova	(Bangladesh) Fortis FC	Free Transfer	23 July 2026	
MF	(Bangladesh) Enamul Islam Gazi	(Bangladesh) Abahani Limited Dhaka	Free Transfer	24 July 2026	
FW	(Pakistan) Shayak Dost	(Bangladesh) Brothers Union	Free agent	1 August 2026	
MF	(The Gambia) Foday Darboe	Bangladesh Police FC	Free agent	1 August 2026	
AM	(Bangladesh) Shahriar Ahmed Shuvo	(Bangladesh) Wari Club	Free agent	18 August 2026	
DM	(Bangladesh) Ashraful Haque Asif	(Bangladesh) Mohammedan SC	Free agent	19 August 2026	
LW	(Bangladesh) (Russia) Mamunul Daniel Khakuyevich	(Russia) Tushino 2010	Free agent	24 August 2026	

=== Out ===
Pos	Player	Moved to	Fee	Date	Source
CM	(Bangladesh) Ariful Haque Shemanto	(Bangladesh) Brothers Union	Free agent	5 September 2026	

== Pre-season friendly ==
4 September 2026 Friendly Match	Bangladesh Police FC	1–1	City Club	Dhaka
15:00 BST (UTC+6)				Stadium: Bangladesh Police FC Practice Ground

8 September 2026 Friendly Match	City Club	0–2	Bangladesh	Dhaka
15:00 BST (UTC+6)			S. Morsalin ?; S. Emon ?	Stadium: Bashundhara Kings Arena

== Overall ==
Win Draw Loss Fixtures

Competition	First match	Last match	Final Position
BFL	September 2026	April 2027	
Federation Cup	October 2026	April 2027	

=== Overview ===
Competition	Record							
Competition	Pld	W	D	L	GF	GA	GD	Win %
BFL	0	0	0	0	0	0	+0	—
Federation Cup	0	0	0	0	0	0	+0	—
Total	0	0	0	0	0	0	+0	—

Last updated: September 2026
Source: Competitions

=== Premier League ===
==== League table ====
Pos	Team	Pld	W	D	L	GF	GA	GD	Pts
4	Brothers Union	0	0	0	0	0	0	0	0
5	Chattogram City	0	0	0	0	0	0	0	0
6	City Club	0	0	0	0	0	0	0	0
7	Dhaka Abahani	0	0	0	0	0	0	0	0
8	Dhaka Wanderers	0	0	0	0	0	0	0	0

Source: Soccerway
Rules for classification: 1) Points; 2) Goal difference; 3) Number of goals scored.

==== Results summary ====
Overall								Home						Away					
Pld	W	D	L	GF	GA	GD	Pts	W	D	L	GF	GA	GD	W	D	L	GF	GA	GD
0	0	0	0	0	0	0	0	0	0	0	0	0	0	0	0	0	0	0	0

Source: Soccerway

==== Results by round ====
Round	1	2	3	4	5	6	7	8	9	10	11	12	13	14	15	16	17	18
Ground																		
Result																		
Position																		

Source: Matches
A = Away; H = Home; W = Win; D = Draw; L = Loss; P = Postponed

==== Matches ====
2026	v
BST (UTC+6)

2026	v
BST (UTC+6)

2026	v
BST (UTC+6)

2026	v
BST (UTC+6)

2026	v
BST (UTC+6)

== Statistics ==
=== Goalscorers ===
As of August 2026

Rank	Player	Position	Total	BFL	Federation
1	TBC	TBC	0	0	0
Total			0	0	0
