= 2019–20 Dhaka Third Division Football League =

Bangladeshi football league season

Dhaka Third Division Football League
- Season: 2019–20
- Dates: 24 February–9 September 2021
- Champions: Alamgir Shomaj Kollayan KS
- Promoted: Alamgir Shomaj Kollayan KS, Kingstar SC, Kallol Shangha, Bikrampur Kings, Jabid Ahsan Sohel KC
- Relegated: Fakirerpool Shurjo Torun Shangha, Chawkbazar United
- Goals: Shekh Morsalin
- Top goalscorer: 19

The 2019–20 Third Division Football League kicked off on 24 February and ended on 9 September 2021. A total of 18 football clubs are participated in the league.

== Venue ==
Dhaka
BSSS Mostafa Kamal Stadium
Capacity: 25,000

== Teams ==
18 teams divided into two groups for first phase. Top five teams of each group will qualify for the Super League phase. The draw held on 18 February, 2021.

| Group A | Group B |
|---|---|
| Tangail Football Academy | Kingstar Sporting Club |
| Dipali Jubo Shangha | Wajed Miya KC |
| Kallol Shangha | Araf Sporting Club |
| Lalbagh Sporting Club | Rainbow Athletic Club |
| Bikrampur Kings | Jabid Ahsan Sohel KC |
| The Muslim Institute | Shantinagar Club |
| Narinda Junior Lions Club | Asaduzzaman Football Academy |
| Uttara Friends Club | Alamgir Shomaj Kollayan KS |
| Fakirerpool Shurjo Torun Shangha | Chawkbazar United |

== First round ==
Key to colour in group tables
| Top five teams of each group are advance to the Super League |

=== Group A ===
| Pos. | Team | Pld. | Pts. | Qualification |
|---|---|---|---|---|
| 1 | Kallol Shangha | 8 | 18 | Qualification for the Super League |
| 2 | The Muslim Institute | 8 | 14 | Qualification for the Super League |
| 3 | Dipali Jubo Shangha | 8 | 13 | Qualification for the Super League |
| 4 | Narinda JLC | 8 | 13 | Qualification for the Super League |
| 5 | Bikrampur Kings | 8 | 10 | Qualification for the Super League |
| 6 | Tangail FA | 8 | 9 | |
| 7 | Uttara Friends Club | 8 | 8 | |
| 8 | Lalbagh SC | 8 | 6 | |
| 9 | Fakirerpool Shurjo Torun Shangha (R) | 8 | 3 | Relegation to Pioneer Football League (Bangladesh) |

=== Group B ===
| Pos | Team | Pld | W | D | L | GF | GA | GD | Pts | Qualification |
|---|---|---|---|---|---|---|---|---|---|---|
| 1 | Kingstar Sporting Club (Note: Chawkbazar United forfeited their opening league match and their opponents Kingstar Sporting Club were awarded a Walkover.) | 8 | 5 | 3 | 0 | 15 | 5 | +10 | 18 | Qualification for the Super League |
| 2 | Alamgir Shomaj Kollayan KS | 8 | 5 | 1 | 2 | 13 | 5 | +8 | 16 | Qualification for the Super League |
| 3 | Jabid Ahsan Sohel KC | 8 | 4 | 2 | 2 | 12 | 5 | +7 | 14 | Qualification for the Super League |
| 4 | Asaduzzaman FA | 8 | 3 | 4 | 1 | 14 | 8 | +6 | 13 | Qualification for the Super League |
| 5 | Shantinagar Club | 8 | 3 | 3 | 2 | 9 | 9 | 0 | 12 | Qualification for the Super League |
| 6 | Wajed Miya KC | 8 | 3 | 2 | 3 | 8 | 8 | 0 | 11 | |
| 7 | Rainbow Athletic Club | 8 | 1 | 2 | 5 | 2 | 9 | −7 | 5 | |
| 8 | Araf Sporting Club | 8 | 1 | 2 | 5 | 5 | 16 | −11 | 5 | |
| 9 | Chawkbazar United (R) | 8 | 1 | 1 | 6 | 3 | 14 | −11 | 4 | Relegation to Pioneer Football League |

Source: BFF
(R) Relegated

== Super League ==
=== League table ===
| Pos | Team | Pld | W | D | L | GF | GA | GD | Pts | Qualification or relegation |
|---|---|---|---|---|---|---|---|---|---|---|
| 1 | Alamgir Shomaj Kollayan KS (C) | 9 | 6 | 3 | 0 | 29 | 7 | +22 | 21 | Qualification for 2021–22 Dhaka Second Division Football League |
| 2 | Kingstar Sporting Club | 9 | 5 | 4 | 0 | 15 | 5 | +10 | 19 | Qualification for 2021–22 Dhaka Second Division Football League |
| 3 | Kallol Shangha | 9 | 4 | 4 | 1 | 12 | 7 | +5 | 16 | Qualification for 2021–22 Dhaka Second Division Football League |
| 4 | Jabid Ahsan Sohel KC | 9 | 3 | 5 | 1 | 13 | 6 | +7 | 14 | Qualification for 2021–22 Dhaka Second Division Football League |
| 5 | Bikrampur Kings | 9 | 4 | 1 | 4 | 11 | 12 | −1 | 13 | Qualification for 2021–22 Dhaka Second Division Football League |
| 6 | Shantinagar Club | 9 | 2 | 4 | 3 | 8 | 12 | −4 | 10 | |
| 7 | Narinda JLC | 9 | 2 | 2 | 5 | 16 | 17 | −1 | 8 | |
| 8 | The Muslim Institute | 9 | 2 | 2 | 5 | 7 | 24 | −17 | 8 | |
| 9 | Dipali Jubo Shangha | 9 | 1 | 3 | 5 | 11 | 16 | −5 | 6 | |
| 10 | Asaduzzaman FA | 9 | 1 | 2 | 6 | 9 | 25 | −16 | 5 | |

Source: BFF
Rules for classification: 1) Points; 2) Goal difference; 3) Goals scored.
(C) Champions
