= Arman Foysal Akash =

Bangladeshi footballer (born 2004)

Personal information
- Full name: Arman Foysal Akash
- Date of birth: 13 January 2004 (age 22)
- Place of birth: Jamalpur, Bangladesh
- Height: 1.85 m (6 ft 1 in)
- Positions: Left winger; striker

Team information
- Current team: Bangladesh Police
- Number: 96

Youth career
- 2015–2022: BKSP

Senior career*
| Years | Team | Apps | (Gls) |
| 2021 | Alamgir SKKS | 15 | (8) |
| 2022–2023 | AFC Uttara | 11 | (0) |
| 2023–2024 | Fortis | 9 | (0) |
| 2024–2025 | Dhaka Abahani | 8 | (1) |
| 2025–2026 | PWD | 10 | (1) |
| 2026– | Bangladesh Police | 3 | (1) |

International career^{‡}
| 2023–2025 | Bangladesh U23 | 7 | (1) |
| 2025– | Bangladesh | 1 | (0) |
- * Club domestic league appearances and goals as of 27 September 2025 ‡ National team caps and goals as of 17 October 2026

Arman Foysal Akash (Bengali: আরমান ফয়সাল আকাশ; born 13 January 2004) is a Bangladeshi professional footballer who plays as a left-winger for Bangladesh Football League club Bangladesh Police and the Bangladesh national team.

== Early career ==
Akash, a graduate from Bangladesh Krira Shikkha Protishtan (BKSP), represented the institution's football team in numerous local tournaments. In 2021, he was among the many players brought in from BKSP by Alamgir Somaj Kollayan, helping them win the 2019–20 Dhaka Third Division Football League.

== Club career ==
On 26 May 2023, Akash made his professional league debut playing for AFC Uttara against Chittagong Abahani during the 2022–23 Bangladesh Premier League.

On 20 October 2023, while representing his services team, the Bangladesh Navy, Akash scored in a 2–0 victory over Dhaka University, to help Navy qualify for the 2023–24 Independence Cup main round.

== International career ==
On 6 September 2023, Akash made his debut for Bangladesh U23 in a 0–2 defeat to Malaysia U23 during the 2024 AFC U-23 Asian Cup qualifiers.

In September 2023, Akash was called up to the Bangladesh national team preliminary squad for the 2026 FIFA World Cup qualification – AFC first round. However, he failed to make the final squad. He returned to the preliminary squad for the 2026 FIFA World Cup qualification – AFC second round. Eventually, he was again dropped from the squad during the final selection.

On 28 February 2024, Akash returned to the national team's preliminary squad for home and away fixtures against Palestine in the second round of the World Cup qualifiers.

== Personal life ==
Arman works in the Bangladesh Navy and is obligated to represent the Navy football team in any competition in which it takes part.

== Career statistics ==
=== Club ===
As of 27 May 2025.

Appearances and goals by club, season and competition
| Club | Season | League | | | Domestic Cup (Note: Appearance(s) in Bangladesh Federation Cup) | | Other | | Continental | | Total | |
| Club | Season | Division | Apps | Goals | Apps | Goals | Apps | Goals | Apps | Goals | Apps | Goals |
|---|---|---|---|---|---|---|---|---|---|---|---|---|
| Alamgir SKKS | 2019–20 | Dhaka Third Division League | 15 | 8 | — | | — | | — | | 15 | 8 |
| AFC Uttara | 2022–23 | Bangladesh Football League | 11 | 0 | 3 | 0 | 0 | 0 | — | | 14 | 0 |
| Fortis | 2023–24 | Bangladesh Football League | 9 | 0 | 2 | 0 | 0 | 0 | — | | 11 | 0 |
| Dhaka Abahani | 2024–25 | Bangladesh Football League | 8 | 1 | 3 | 1 | — | | — | | 11 | 2 |
| PWD | 2025–26 | Bangladesh Football League | 0 | 0 | 0 | 0 | 0 | 0 | — | | 0 | 0 |
| Career total | | | 43 | 9 | 8 | 1 | 0 | 0 | 0 | 0 | 51 | 10 |

=== Navy ===
As of 31 October 2023.

Appearances and goals by Navy football team, year and competition
| Team | Year | Domestic | | Contitnental | | Total | |
| Team | Year | Apps | Goals | Apps | Goals | Apps | Goals |
|---|---|---|---|---|---|---|---|
| Bangladesh Navy | 2022–23 | 4 (Note: One appearance in Bangladesh Independence Cup qualifiers, three appearances in Bangladesh Independence Cup) | 0 | 0 | 0 | 4 | 0 |
| Bangladesh Navy | 2023–24 | 3 (Note: One appearance and one goal in Bangladesh Independence Cup qualifiers, two appearances in Bangladesh Independence Cup) | 1 | 0 | 0 | 3 | 1 |
| Career total | | 7 | 1 | 0 | 0 | 7 | 1 |

=== International ===
As of 14 October 2025.

Appearances and goals by national team and year
| National team | Year | Apps | Goals |
|---|---|---|---|
| Bangladesh | 2025 | 1 | 0 |
| Total | | 1 | 0 |

== Honours ==
Alamgir Somaj Kollayan KS

- Dhaka Third Division League: 2019–20
