= Kawsar Ali Rabbi =

Bangladeshi footballer

Personal information
- Full name: Kawsar Ali Rabbi
- Date of birth: 8 August 1996 (age 30)
- Place of birth: Chittagong, Bangladesh
- Position: Left winger

Team information
- Current team: Brothers Union
- Number: 77

Senior career*
Years	Team	Apps	(Gls)
2013	Victoria SC		(1)
2013–2016	Brothers Union		(2)
2017–2018	Sheikh Russel KC	15	(0)
2018–2020	Mohammedan SC	19	(2)
2020–2022	Chittagong Abahani	12	(1)
2022	Saif SC	8	(0)
2022–2023	Fortis	10	(0)
2023–2024	Chittagong Abahani	3	(0)
2024–	Brothers Union	6	(0)
- * Club domestic league appearances and goals as of 10 January 2025

Kawsar Ali Rabbi (Bengali: কাওসার আলী রাব্বি; born 8 August 1996) is a Bangladeshi professional footballer who plays as a left-winger for Bangladesh Football League club Brothers Union.

== Club career ==
=== Victoria SC ===
On 30 May 2013, Rabbi scored his first professional goal for Victoria SC against Agrani Bank SC in the 2013 Bangladesh Championship League, in a game which ended 1–1.

=== Fortis FC ===
On 7 August 2022, Rabbi joined newly promoted Fortis FC following the withdrawal of Saif SC from 2022–23 Bangladesh Premier League.

=== Brothers Union ===
On 14 January 2025, Rabbi scored the winning goal for Brothers Union against his former club, Fortis FC, to keep the Oranges in contention for the knockout round of the 2024–25 Federation Cup. Following the conclusion of the match he stated, "A season ago, I played well for them (Fortis FC) in the first round of the league after which, I barely got a chance to play. They could not tolerate the fact that I spoke about their various irregularities. They still owe me my salary of Tk 2 lakhs. So, after scoring a goal I went to celebrate in front of the Fortis dugout. You can also call it my revenge."
