= Kamrul Islam (footballer) =

Bangladeshi footballer

Personal information
- Full name: Mohammad Kamrul Islam
- Date of birth: 25 December 1998 (age 27)
- Place of birth: Rangamati, Bangladesh
- Height: 1.75 m (5 ft 9 in)
- Position: Left-back

Team information
- Current team: Dhaka Abahani
- Number: 3

Senior career*
Years	Team	Apps	(Gls)
2016–17	Kashaituly SKP		
2017	Bangladesh Boys		
2017	NoFeL SC	18	(3)
2017–18	Farashganj SC	5	(0)
2018–20	NoFeL SC	23	(2)
2020–22	Mohammedan SC	21	(1)
2022–23	Chittagong Abahani	17	(1)
2023–24	Mohammedan SC	24	(0)
2024–	Dhaka Abahani	18	(0)
- * Club domestic league appearances and goals as of 27 May 2025

Kamrul Islam (Bengali: কামরুল ইসলাম; born 25 December 1998) is a Bangladeshi professional footballer who plays as a left-back for Bangladesh Premier League club Abahani Limited Dhaka.

== Club career ==
On 14 August 2021, Kamrul scored his first goal for Mohammedan, a free-kick in a 2–1 victory over Rahmatganj MFS.

On 30 May 2023, he scored the winning penalty as Mohammedan SC defeated arch-rivals Abahani Limited Dhaka 4–2 on penalties in the 2022–23 Federation Cup final. Following the club's first title triumph in nine years, Kamrul stated, "(I) had to score to win. We had no trophies in our football careers. Now we will return to Dhaka taking this trophy".

In August 2023, Kamrul represented the Bangladesh Army in the 2023 Durand Cup in India.

In June 2024, Kamrul joined Mohammedan's arch-rivals, Abahani Limited Dhaka, for the 2024–25 season.

== Honours ==
Kashaituli Samaj Kallayan Parishad

- Dhaka Second Division League runner-up: 2017

Mohammedan SC

- Federation Cup: 2022–23
