= Sahariar Emon =

Bangladeshi footballer

Personal information
- Full name: Mohammed Sahariar Emon
- Date of birth: 7 March 2001 (age 25)
- Place of birth: Khulna, Bangladesh
- Position: Right winger

Team information
- Current team: Mohammedan
- Number: 99

Senior career*
Years	Team	Apps	(Gls)
2021–2024	Mohammedan	52	(8)
2024–2025	Dhaka Abahani	14	(1)
2025–2026	Bashundhara Kings	11	(2)
2026–	Mohammedan	0	(0)

International career^{‡}
2024–	Bangladesh	14	(1)
- * Club domestic league appearances and goals as of 10 September 2026 ‡ National team caps and goals as of 1 October 2026

Sahariar Emon (Bengali: শাহরিয়ার ইমন; born 7 March 2001) is a Bangladeshi professional footballer who plays as a right-winger for Bangladesh Premier League club Mohammedan and the Bangladesh national team. He is also an active soldier for the Bangladesh Army.

== Early life ==
During his primary education years, Emon started off as a goalkeeper but once he reached sixth grade, Saiful Islam who was his high school teacher in Khulna, used him as a forward and Emon made it to the school team within three years. While in pursuit of becoming a professional foobtballer, he faced strong resistance from his parents who wanted their eldest son of four children to build up his career in conventional means. In 2017, his career faced a standstill, after failing to pass his SSC examination. Nonetheless, he redeemed himself in the re-examinations with a 3.53 GPA, which convinced his parents to let him pursue football. The following year, he played in the Khulna First Division and Khulna Second Division leagues. In 2018, with advice from his mentor Prashanta Kumar Dey, Emon came to Dhaka and took part in the trials for the Mohammedan SC U18 team. After failing to make the cut during the trials, he enrolled in the Bangladesh Army, in 2019. In 2021, he was the top scorer with 5 goals, including one in the final, as Army were champions of the men's football event in the 9th Bangladesh Games.

== Club career ==
=== Mohammedan ===
On 25 November 2021, Emon joined Mohammedan, after impressing the clubs former striker Alfaz Ahmed, who regularly trained the Army Football Team. With the Bangladesh Army, he took part in the 2021 Independence Cup. On 2 December 2021, Emon scored the winning goal as Army caused a major upset by defeating his parent club Mohammedan 2–1 to reach the quarter-finals of the tournament.

On 22 June 2022, Emon scored a solo goal for Mohammedan in the league against arch-rivals Abahani Limited Dhaka. Although his team went on to lose the Dhaka Derby 2–4, his goal heaped praise from the local media. On 6 August 2023, Emon scored as Army held East Bengal 2–2 in the 2023 Durand Cup.

=== Abahani Limited Dhaka ===
In June 2024, Emon was one of the four Mohammedan players to join arch-rivals, Abahani Limited Dhaka.

=== Mohammedan ===
Uddin joined Mohammedan in 2026.

== International career ==
In August 2022, Bangladesh national team head coach Javier Cabrera, drafted Emon in the Bangladesh preliminary squad for the September FIFA window. Nonetheless, he failed to make the final squad. In March 2023, he was recalled to the team for a training camp held in Medina, Saudi Arabia.

Emon made his debut for the Bangladesh national team on 11 June 2024 in a World Cup qualifier against Lebanon at the Khalifa International Stadium in Qatar. He substituted Jamal Bhuyan in the 69th minute, as Lebanon won 4–0.

On 1 October 2026, Emon scored his first international goal for Bangladesh in a 9–2 defeat against Indonesia in the 2026 FIFA ASEAN Cup.

== Career statistics ==
=== Club ===
As of 29 May 2024.

Appearances and goals by club, season and competition
Club	Season	League			Domestic Cup (Note: Appearance(s) in Bangladesh Federation Cup)		Other		Continental		Total	
Club	Season	Division	Apps	Goals	Apps	Goals	Apps	Goals	Apps	Goals	Apps	Goals
Mohammedan	2021–22	Bangladesh Premier League	17	2	3	1	0	0	—		20	3
Mohammedan	2022–23	Bangladesh Premier League	18	3	6	1	0	0	—		24	4
Mohammedan	2023–24	Bangladesh Premier League	17	3	5	1	0	0	—		22	4
Mohammedan	Total		52	8	14	3	0	0	0	0	66	11
Dhaka Abahani	2024–25	Bangladesh Premier League	0	0	0	0	0	0	—		0	0
Career total			52	8	14	3	0	0	0	0	66	11

=== Army ===
As of 21 January 2024.

Appearances and goals by Army football team, year and competition
Team	Year	Domestic		Contitnental		Total	
Team	Year	Apps	Goals	Apps	Goals	Apps	Goals
Bangladesh Army	2021–22	4 (Note: Appearance(s) in Bangladesh Independence Cup)	1	0	0	4	1
Bangladesh Army	2022–23	1 (Note: Appearance(s) in Bangladesh Independence Cup qualifiers)	0	0	0	1	0
Bangladesh Army	2023–24	4 (Note: One appearance in Bangladesh Independence Cup qualifiers, three appearances and one goal in Bangladesh Independence Cup)	1	3 (Note: Appearance(s) in Durand Cup)	1	7	2
Career total		9	2	3	1	12	3

=== International ===
As of 1 October 2026

Appearances and goals by national team and year
National team	Year	Apps	Goals
Bangladesh	2024	5	0
Bangladesh	2025	5	0
Bangladesh	2026	4	1
Total		14	1

As of match played 1 October 2026
Scores and results list Bangladesh's goal tally first, score column indicates score after each Emon goal.

List of international goals scored by Sahariar Emon
No.	Date	Venue	Opponent	Score	Result	Competition
1.	1 October 2026	Gelora Bung Karno Stadium, Jakarta, Indonesia	Indonesia	1–3	2–9	2026 FIFA ASEAN Cup

== Honours ==
Dhaka Mohammedan

- Federation Cup: 2022–23
