= Shakil Hossain (footballer) =

Bangladeshi footballer

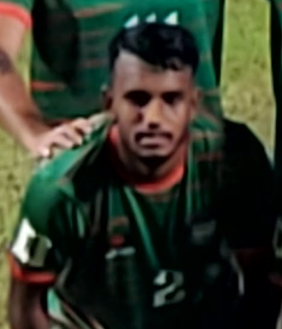
- Shakil with Bangladesh in 2023

Personal information
- Full name: Mohammed Shakil Hossain
- Date of birth: 6 July 2002 (age 24)
- Place of birth: Rajshahi, Bangladesh
- Positions: Centre back; defensive midfielder

Team information
- Current team: Fortis

Senior career*
Years	Team	Apps	(Gls)
2018–2020	Brothers Union	10	(0)
2020–2022	Swadhinata KS	33	(1)
2022–2024	Sheikh Jamal DC	35	(0)
2024–2026	Dhaka Abahani	30	(1)
2026–	Fortis	0	(0)

International career^{‡}
2023	Bangladesh U23	5	(0)
2023–	Bangladesh	10	(0)
- * Club domestic league appearances and goals as of 12 October 2026 ‡ National team caps and goals as of 8 September 2024

Shakil Hossain (Bengali: শাকিল হোসেন; born 6 July 2002) is a Bangladeshi professional footballer who plays as a centre back for Bangladesh Premier League club Fortis and the Bangladesh national team.

== Club career ==
=== Brothers Union ===
Shakil began his professional career with Brothers Union during the 2018–19 Bangladesh Premier League. He made his professional league debut against Arambagh KS during a 2–5 defeat, on 2 August 2019.

=== Swadhinata KS ===
In 2021, Shakil joined Swadhinata KS in the second-tier and played an important role as the club secured promotion to the Premier League by winning the 2020–21 Bangladesh Championship League.

=== Fortis ===
In August 2026, Fortis recruited Hossain from Abahani Limited for its AFC Challenge League campaign.

== International career ==
In 2023, Shakil represented Bangladesh U23 in both the 2024 AFC U-23 Asian Cup qualifiers and the 2022 Asian Games.

On 12 October 2023, Shakil made his debut for Bangladesh against Maldives during the 2026 FIFA World Cup qualification – AFC first round.

He remained in the squad for the second round.

== Career statistics ==
=== Club ===
As of 21 July 2023.

Appearances and goals by club, season and competition
Club	Season	League			Domestic Cup (Note: Appearance(s) in Bangladesh Federation Cup)		Other (Note: Appearance(s) in Bangladesh Independence Cup)		Continental		Total	
Club	Season	Division	Apps	Goals	Apps	Goals	Apps	Goals	Apps	Goals	Apps	Goals
Brothers Union	2018–19	Bangladesh Premier League	10	0	0	0	0	0	—		10	0
Brothers Union	2019–20	Bangladesh Premier League	0	0	0	0	—		—		0	0
Brothers Union	Brothers Union total		10	0	0	0	0	0	0	0	10	0
Swadhinata KS	2020–21	Bangladesh Championship League	20	1	—		—		—		20	1
Swadhinata KS	2021–22	Bangladesh Premier League	13	0	2	0	3	0	—		17	0
Swadhinata KS	Swadhinata KS total		33	0	2	0	3	0	0	0	38	0
Sheikh Jamal DC	2022–23	Bangladesh Premier League	17	0	4	0	4	0	—		25	0
Sheikh Jamal DC	2023–24	Bangladesh Premier League	0	0	0	0	2	0	—		2	0
Sheikh Jamal DC	Sheikh Jamal DC total		17	0	4	0	6	0	0	0	27	0
Career total			60	1	6	0	9	0	0	0	75	1

=== International ===
As of 8 September 2024.

Bangladesh national team
Year	Apps	Goals
2023	4	0
2024	6	0
Total	10	0

== Honours ==
Swadhinata KS

- Bangladesh Championship League: 2021
