= Mahfuz Hasan Pritom =

Bangladeshi footballer (born 1999)

Personal information
- Full name: Mahfuz Hasan Pritom
- Date of birth: 5 November 1999 (age 27)
- Place of birth: Sirajganj, Bangladesh
- Height: 1.75 m (5 ft 9 in)
- Position: Goalkeeper

Team information
- Current team: Dhaka Abahani
- Number: 1

Youth career
- 2013–2017: BKSP

Senior career*
| Years | Team | Apps | (Gls) |
| 2015–2019 | Arambagh | | (0) |
| 2019–2021 | Muktijoddha | 18 | (0) |
| 2021–2023 | Dhaka Abahani | 6 | (0) |
| 2023–2024 | Sheikh Jamal | 16 | (0) |
| 2024– | Dhaka Abahani | 8 | (0) |

International career
| 2017 | Bangladesh U20 | 8 | (0) |
Medal record
Representing Bangladesh
SAFF U-20 Championship
| Runner-up | 2017 Bhutan | Team |
South Asian Games
| Bronze medal – third place | 2019 Nepal | Team |
- * Club domestic league appearances and goals as of 23 October 2026

Mahfuz Hasan Pritom (Bengali: মাহফুজ হাসান প্রীতম; born 5 November 1999) is a Bangladeshi professional footballer who plays as a goalkeeper for Bangladesh Premier League club Abahani Limited Dhaka.

== Honours ==
Abahani Limited Dhaka

- Federation Cup: 2021
- Independence Cup: 2021

Bangladesh U-23

- South Asian Games bronze medal: 2019
