= Mitul Marma =

Bangladeshi footballer (born 2003)

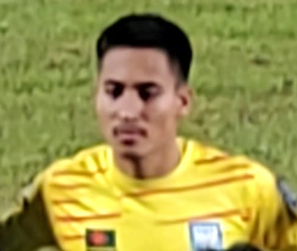
- Mitul with Bangladesh in 2023

Personal information
- Full name: Mitul Marma
- Date of birth: 11 December 2003 (age 22)
- Place of birth: Rangamati, Bangladesh
- Height: 1.80 m (5 ft 11 in)
- Position: Goalkeeper

Team information
- Current team: Dhaka Abahani
- Number: 30

Youth career
- 2015: Noakhali FA
- 2018: Mohammedan

Senior career*
Years	Team	Apps	(Gls)
2020–2021	Uttar Baridhara	18	(0)
2021–2022	Sheikh Jamal	5	(0)
2022–2023	Fortis	15	(0)
2023–2024	Sheikh Russel	14	(0)
2024–	Dhaka Abahani	18	(0)

International career^{‡}
2018–2019	Bangladesh U15	5	(0)
2021–	Bangladesh U23	4	(0)
2023–	Bangladesh	21	(0)
Medal record
Men's football
Representing Bangladesh
SAFF U-15 Championship
Winner	2018 Nepal	Team
SAFF U-18 Championship
Runner-up	2019 Nepal	Team
- * Club domestic league appearances and goals as of 19 October 2025 ‡ National team caps and goals as of 5 June 2026

Mitul Marma (Bengali: মিতুল মারমা; born 11 December 2003) is a Bangladeshi Marma professional footballer who plays as a goalkeeper for Bangladesh Premier League club Abahani Limited Dhaka and the Bangladesh national team.

Mitul has played for Bangladesh U15 and Bangladesh U23 too. He also won 2018 SAFF U-15 Championship with Bangladesh U-15.

== Early career ==
Mitul's football journey was guided by Shantjit Tanchangya, a local teacher in Rangamati. He began with Bangabandhu Primary School Football and then represented the Rangamati District Team. In 2015, Mitul represented Noakhali Football Academy in the Pioneer League. In 2017, he played for Bangladesh Government Press SRC in the Dhaka Third Division League. In 2018, Mitul participated in the BFF U-18 Tournament with Mohammedan Sporting which led to him being selected for the Bangladesh U-15 team.

== Club career ==
=== Uttar Baridhara ===
In 2020, Mitul joined Uttar Baridhara in the Bangladesh Premier League, after having been instrumental for Bangladesh in youth football in the previous few years. On 23 December 2020, he made his debut for the club against Saif, coming on as a substitute for Azad Hossain in the 80th minute during the 2020 Federation Cup. He went onto to make a total of 18 appearances in the league season, which earned him a senior national team call up later that year.

=== Sheikh Jamal ===
On 25 November 2021, Mitul joined Sheikh Jamal Dhanmondi Club after his impressive stint with Uttar Baridhara. His transfer to the Dhanmondi-based club came with controversy, as Uttar Baridhara filed an official complaint, accusing him of taking advanced payments. Mitul made five appearances in the league that year under coach Juan Manuel Martínez Sáez, however, following the appointment of Joseph Afusi, he spent the remainder of the season as a substitute.

=== Fortis ===
On 7 August 2022, Mitul joined Premier League newcomers, Fortis.

On 13 November 2022, he made his competitive debut for the against Sheikh Russel KC in the 2022 Independence Cup.

=== Sheikh Russel KC ===
In July 2023, Mitul signed for Sheikh Russel KC for the 2023–24 season. He captained the team throughout the season, making 16 appearances in all competitions.

=== Abahani Limited Dhaka ===
In June 2024, Mitul joined Abahani Limited Dhaka for the 2024–25 season.

== International career ==
=== Youth ===
Mitul played 2018 SAFF U-15 Championship for Bangladesh U-15. Mitul was sent off during a 2–1 victory over Nepal U15. He also started in the final, however, was substituted by Mehedi Hasan during the penalty shootout. Mitul also played two games in the 2018 UEFA Assist U-15 Development Tournament in Thailand.

Mitul was part of the Bangladesh U-19 team in both the 2019 SAFF U-18 Championship and 2020 AFC U-19 Championship qualification as a substitute. He also represented Bangladesh in the 2019 U19 Three Nations Tournament, an invitational tournament, hosted by Qatar Football Association.

Mitul was named in the Bangladesh U23 team by coach Maruful Haque for the AFC U-23 Championship 2022 qualifiers. On 2 November 2021, he started the last group stage match against Saudi Arabia U23 which concluded in a 3–0 defeat and during the game Mitul was replaced by goalkeeper Pappu Hossain in the first half.

Mitul represented the Olympic team at the 2022 Asian Games in Huangzhou, China. He appeared in all three group-stage fixtures where he produced impressive performances against both India U23 and hosts, China U23, keeping a cleansheet against the latter.

=== Senior ===
Mitul got his first call up to the Bangladesh national team in March 2021 as an under-23 standby player. In August 2021, Mitul was included in the 23-men final squad for the Three Nations Cup in Kyrgyzstan. He made his debut for Bangladesh against Kyrgyzstan U23 in an unofficial match on 9 September 2021.

On 12 October 2023, Mitul made his official debut for Bangladesh in their 1–1 draw with Maldives in the 2026 FIFA World Cup qualification – AFC first round.

== Career statistics ==
As of 17 May 2024.

Appearances and goals by club, season and competition
Club	Season	League			Domestic Cup (Note: Appearance(s) in Bangladesh Federation Cup)		Other (Note: Appearance(s) in Bangladesh Independence Cup)		Continental		Total	
Club	Season	Division	Apps	Goals	Apps	Goals	Apps	Goals	Apps	Goals	Apps	Goals
Uttar Baridhara	2020–21	Bangladesh Premier League	18	0	1	0	—		—		19	0
Sheikh Jamal DC	2021–22	Bangladesh Premier League	5	0	1	0	0	0	—		6	0
Fortis	2022–23	Bangladesh Premier League	15	0	2	0	2	0	—		19	0
Sheikh Russel KC	2023–24	Bangladesh Premier League	14	0	2	0	0	0	—		16	0
Dhaka Abahani	2024–25	Bangladesh Premier League	0	0	0	0	0	0	—		0	0
Career total			52	0	6	0	2	0	0	0	60	0

=== International ===
As of 5 June 2026.

Bangladesh national team
Year	Apps	Goals
2023	4	0
2024	8	0
2025	7	0
2026	2	0
Total	21	0

== Honours ==
Bangladesh U15

- SAFF U-15 Championship: 2018
