= Emeka Ogbugh =

Nigerian footballer (born 1990)

Personal information
- Full name: Chukwudiebube Emeka Ogbugh
- Date of birth: 22 February 1990 (age 36)
- Place of birth: Umuahia, Nigeria
- Height: 1.81 m (5 ft 11 1/2 in)
- Positions: Striker; right winger

Team information
- Current team: Bashundhara Kings

Senior career*
Years	Team	Apps	(Gls)
2012–2016	Heartland	75	(13)
2017–2018	Rivers United	40	(11)
2018–2020	MC Oujda	39	(6)
2021–2022	Saif SC	17	(12)
2022–2026	Dhaka Abahani	27	(13)
2026–	Bashundhara Kings		

International career^{‡}
2018	Nigeria	5	(0)
- * Club domestic league appearances and goals as of 6 October 2026 ‡ National team caps and goals as of 4 February 2018

Emeka Ogbugh (born 22 February 1990) is a Nigerian professional footballer who plays as a striker for Bangladesh Premier League club Bashundhara Kings.

== Club career ==
He joined Bashundhara Kings in 2026.
