= Shekh Morsalin =

Bangladeshi footballer (born 2005)

Personal information
- Full name: Shekh Saibur Rahman Morsalin
- Date of birth: 19 February 2005 (age 21)
- Place of birth: Faridpur, Bangladesh
- Height: 1.75 m (5 ft 9 in)
- Positions: Midfielder; forward

Team information
- Current team: Dhaka Abahani
- Number: 33

Youth career
- 2016–2022: BKSP

Senior career*
Years	Team	Apps	(Gls)
2021	Alamgir SKKS	16	(19)
2021–2025	Bashundhara Kings	23	(6)
2022	→ Mohammedan (loan)	7	(2)
2025–	Dhaka Abahani	15	(6)

International career^{‡}
2025–	Bangladesh U23	4	(1)
2023–	Bangladesh	26	(7)
- * Club domestic league appearances and goals as of 24 May 2026 ‡ National team caps and goals as of 1 October 2026

Shekh Morsalin (Bengali: শেখ মোরসালিন, Bengali pronunciation: [ʃekʰ moɾsalin]; born 19 February 2005) is a Bangladeshi professional footballer who plays as an attacking midfielder for Bangladesh Football League club Dhaka Abahani and the Bangladesh national team. A versatile player, Morsalin can also play as a central midfielder, false nine or centre-forward.

== Early career ==
Born in Charbhadrasan Upazila of Faridpur District, Morsalin started playing local football tournaments while still only being a 6th grade student of Adarsh Secondary School. In 2014, when trials for the U-12 national football team were held in Charbhadrasan, Morsalin caught the eye of veteran coach Abul Kashem Bholer. However, due to family problems, Morsalin was unable to join the main camp. In 2015, with the help of his uncle Subahan Rahman, Morsalin's career resumed, when the BFF youth football coach Abdur Razzak saw his potential during a trial and included him in the U-13 national team, for the Mogh Cup held in Malaysia.

In 2016, Morsalin was admitted to BKSP, where he continued his education while playing for BKSP's football team in different tournaments, including the 9th Bangladesh Games, in 2020. During the tournament, he managed to score a notable brace against Satkhira District football team, in the third place playoff. In 2019, he scored six goals in India's Subroto Cup to become the U-17 tournament's second top scorer.

== Club career ==
=== Alamgir Somaj Kollayan KS ===
After the 2019–20 Dhaka Third Division League was delayed due to the COVID-19 pandemic, BKSP coaches arranged Morsalin's move to Alamgir Somaj Kollayan KS, to participate in the delayed league season in 2021. In his first year playing domestic football, Morsalin captained the club to promotion as league champions, and also finished the season as top scorer, with 19 goals from 16 matches. During the season, he also registered a hat-trick against Araf Sporting and a super hat-trick against Asaduzzman FA. In 2021, Morsalin was among the 35 preliminary selected players for Bayern Munich's World Squad, however, he failed to make the final team.

=== Bashundhara Kings ===
==== 2021–22 season: Mohammedan SC (loan) ====
On 25 November 2021, Morsalin joined Bangladesh Premier League club Bashundhara Kings on a three-year contract. While still being a student at BKSP, the initial plan for Morsalin was to train at the club for three years under foreign coaches, and then play in the Premier League. However, club president Imrul Hassan sent him on loan to Mohammedan SC, during the mid season transfer window, to give him game time.

On 20 April 2022, Morsalin joined Mohammedan SC on loan. The 17-year-old made his Premier League debut on 22 June 2022, in a Dhaka Derby match, which Mohammedan lost 2–4. In the following game on 27 June, he scored his first goal for the club in a 3–1 win over Sheikh Jamal Dhanmondi. On 1 July 2022, Morsalin scored a long-range strike against his parent club Bashundhara Kings. His goal earned national recognition and went viral on social media.

Even after securing a regular place at the Mohammedan SC starting eleven, Morsalin expressed his desire to return to his parent club, stating in an interview "I want to focus on coming back to Bashundhara Kings from my loan, be a regular starter there and eventually make it in the Bangladesh national football team. And I've got long-term dreams of playing in a foreign league too if possible in the future."

==== 2022–23 season: Return to Kings ====
On 5 December 2022, Morsalin made his debut for Bashundhara Kings, during the 2022–23 Independence Cup final against Sheikh Russel KC. After 2–2 draw, Kings won the game on penalties, as Morsalin claimed his first title with the club.

On 26 May 2023, he netted his first goal for the club in a 6–4 victory over Sheikh Russel KC. He also registered two assists against Mohammedan SC in the following league fixture, on 2 June 2023. Morsalin's performances in these two games got him called up to the national team camp ahead of the 2023 SAFF Championship.

==== 2023–24 season: Disciplinary issues ====
On 15 August 2023, Morsalin made his continental football debut by coming on as an 84th-minute substitute during a 0–2 defeat against Sharjah in the 2023–24 AFC Champions League qualifying play-offs. On 19 September 2023, he made the starting eleven as Kings were trashed 1–3 by Maziya in the 2023–24 AFC Cup.

On 20 September 2023, Morsalin and four of his teammates were discovered to have illegally brought in 64 bottles of alcohol by customs officials at Shahjalal International Airport in Dhaka. This incident occurred upon their return from the Maldives after defeat in the AFC Cup. Despite the initial indefinite suspension of the players, Morsalin, who was reported to be carrying 10 bottles, had his suspension lifted after receiving a Tk 1 lakh fine from his club.

Nonetheless, Morsalin was excluded from the national squad for the 2026 FIFA World Cup qualification – AFC first round. He was also left out of the Kings squad for an away fixture against Odisha in the AFC Cup. On 28 October 2023, he returned to the pitch by coming on as a second-half substitute against Bangladesh Navy in the 2023 Independence Cup.

== International career ==
=== Youth ===
In August 2025, Morsalin was appointed captain of the Bangladesh U23 team and joined a training camp in Manama, Bahrain. After missing the first preparation match in Bahrain due to injury, he made his debut by coming on as a second-half substitute in a friendly against the Bahrain U23 on 22 August 2025. He later led the team during the 2026 AFC U-23 Asian Cup qualification in Vietnam, where Bangladesh began with defeats to Vietnam U23 and Yemen U23, resulting in early elimination. In the final qualifying match on 9 September 2025, Bangladesh defeated the Singapore U23 4–1, with Morsalin scoring once and assisting the other three goals.

=== Senior ===
Morsalin was a late inclusion to the 35-member preliminary squad for the 2023 SAFF Championship in India, by Spanish coach Javier Cabrera. Despite being the youngest player, he made it into the final 23-member squad for the tournament.

On 15 June 2023, he made his international debut by coming on as a 70th-minute substitute for Jamal Bhuyan in a 1–0 victory over Cambodia.

On 25 June 2023, he scored his first international goal in a 3–1 victory over Maldives, in the 2023 SAFF Championship. In the following game, he scored the equaliser as Bangladesh came from behind to defeat Bhutan 3–1. The victory confirmed the country's berth in the semi-finals of the tournament for the first time in 14 years. He continued his SAFF Championship form by scoring against Afghanistan in a friendly match held in Dhaka on 7 September 2023.

After missing the first round, Morsalin returned to the national team, coming on as a substitute against Australia during a 0–7 defeat in the 2026 FIFA World Cup qualification – AFC second round on 16 November 2023. On 21 November, Morsalin scored a long-range goal in a 1–1 draw against Lebanon in the following qualification match. His performance was recognised by the Asian Football Confederation, which named him one of the standout performers of the round.

Morsalin missed the subsequent home and away World Cup qualifying fixtures against Palestine on 21 and 26 March 2024 due to injury. He later returned for the final two qualifiers, which ended in defeats against Australia and Lebanon on 6 and 11 June 2024, respectively. On 5 September, Morsalin scored in a 1–0 victory over Bhutan in a friendly match held in Thimphu.

On 18 November 2025, in the final 2027 AFC Asian Cup qualification – third round home match against India, Morsalin scored the only goal to secure Bangladesh a win against their rivals after 22 years.

== Personal life ==
In 2023, Morsalin graduated from BKSP with a 5.00 GPA in his HSC examinations. He has stated his interest in pursuing higher studies alongside playing professional football, and also that he has had the full support of his club, Bashundhara Kings. In September 2023, Morsalin was admitted to Dhaka University under its sports quota.

Morsalin married Sejuti Binte Sohel on 29 November 2023. The couple divorced on 23 April 2025. In February 2025, a dowry-related legal case was filed against Morsalin by his then-wife. The case was withdrawn in April 2025.

== Style of play ==
During 2021–22, Morsalin was regarded as the "discovery of the season" by local news outlets. A midfielder who prefers to keep the ball under his control, Morsalin is seen as a versatile player, someone that can play as an attacking-midfielder, false-nine, or a centre-forward, and although the lack of pace, his technical dribbling also makes him an asset on the wings.

Morsalin revealed that he tries to follow Manchester City midfielder Kevin De Bruyne’s style of play, stating in an interview, that during his time at BKSP he regularly watched the Belgian midfielder's videos online. Morsalin also has the ability to score long-range goals, which was evident after his goal against Bashundhara Kings during his debut season in the Bangladesh Premier League. Right-footed Morsalin was mainly used as creative midfielder during his loan spell at Mohammedan SC.

== Career statistics ==
=== Club ===
As of 19 October 2025.

Appearances and goals by club, season and competition
Club	Season	League			Domestic Cup (Note: Appearance(s) in Bangladesh Federation Cup)		Other		Continental		Total	
Club	Season	Division	Apps	Goals	Apps	Goals	Apps	Goals	Apps	Goals	Apps	Goals
Alamgir SKKS	2019–20	Dhaka Third Division League	16	19	—		—		—		16	19
Bashundhara Kings	2021–22	Bangladesh Football League	0	0	0	0	0	0	0	0	0	0
Bashundhara Kings	2022–23	Bangladesh Premier League	8	1	4	0	1 (Note: Appearance(s) in Bangladesh Independence Cup)	0	0	0	13	1
Bashundhara Kings	2023–24	Bangladesh Football League	5	1	3	0	4	0	4 (Note: One appearance in AFC Champions League, three appearances in the AFC Cup)	0	16	1
Bashundhara Kings	2024–25	Bangladesh Football League	10	4	5	0	—		3 (Note: Appearance(s) in AFC Challenge League)	0	18	4
Bashundhara Kings	Bashundhara Kings total		23	6	12	0	5	0	7	0	47	6
Mohammedan (loan)	2021–22	Bangladesh Football League	7	2	0	0	0	0	—		7	2
Dhaka Abahani	2025–26	Bangladesh Football League	2	0	1	2	0	0	1	0	4	2
Career total			48	27	13	2	5	0	8	0	74	29

=== International ===
As of 1 October 2025.

Appearances and goals by national team and year
National team	Year	Apps	Goals
Bangladesh	2023	9	4
Bangladesh	2024	6	1
Bangladesh	2025	6	2
Bangladesh	2025	5	0
Total		26	7

Scores and results list Bangladesh's goal tally first.

List of international goals scored by Shekh Morsalin
No.	Date	Venue	Opponent	Score	Result	Competition
1.	25 June 2023	Sree Kanteerava Stadium, Bangalore, India	Maldives	3–1	3–1	2023 SAFF Championship
2.	28 June 2023	Sree Kanteerava Stadium, Bangalore, India	Bhutan	1–1	3–1	2023 SAFF Championship
3.	7 September 2023	Bashundhara Kings Arena, Dhaka, Bangladesh	Afghanistan	1–1	1–1	FIFA Friendly
4.	21 November 2023	Bashundhara Kings Arena, Dhaka, Bangladesh	Lebanon	1–1	1–1	2026 FIFA World Cup qualifiers – 2R
5.	5 September 2024	Changlimithang Stadium, Thimphu, Bhutan	Bhutan	1–0	1–0	FIFA Friendly
6.	9 October 2025	National Stadium, Dhaka, Bangladesh	Hong Kong	2–3	3–4	AFC Asian Cup qualifiers – 3R
7.	18 November 2025	National Stadium, Dhaka, Bangladesh	India	1–0	1–0	AFC Asian Cup qualifiers – 3R

== Honours ==
Alamgir Somaj Kollayan KS

- Dhaka Third Division League: 2019–20

Bashundhara Kings

- Bangladesh Premier League: 2022–23, 2023–24
- Independence Cup: 2022–23, 2023–24; runner-up: 2021–22
- Federation Cup third place: 2022–23

Individual

- Dhaka Third Division League top scorer: 2019–20
