= Mohammad Ibrahim (footballer, born 1997) =

Bangladeshi footballer

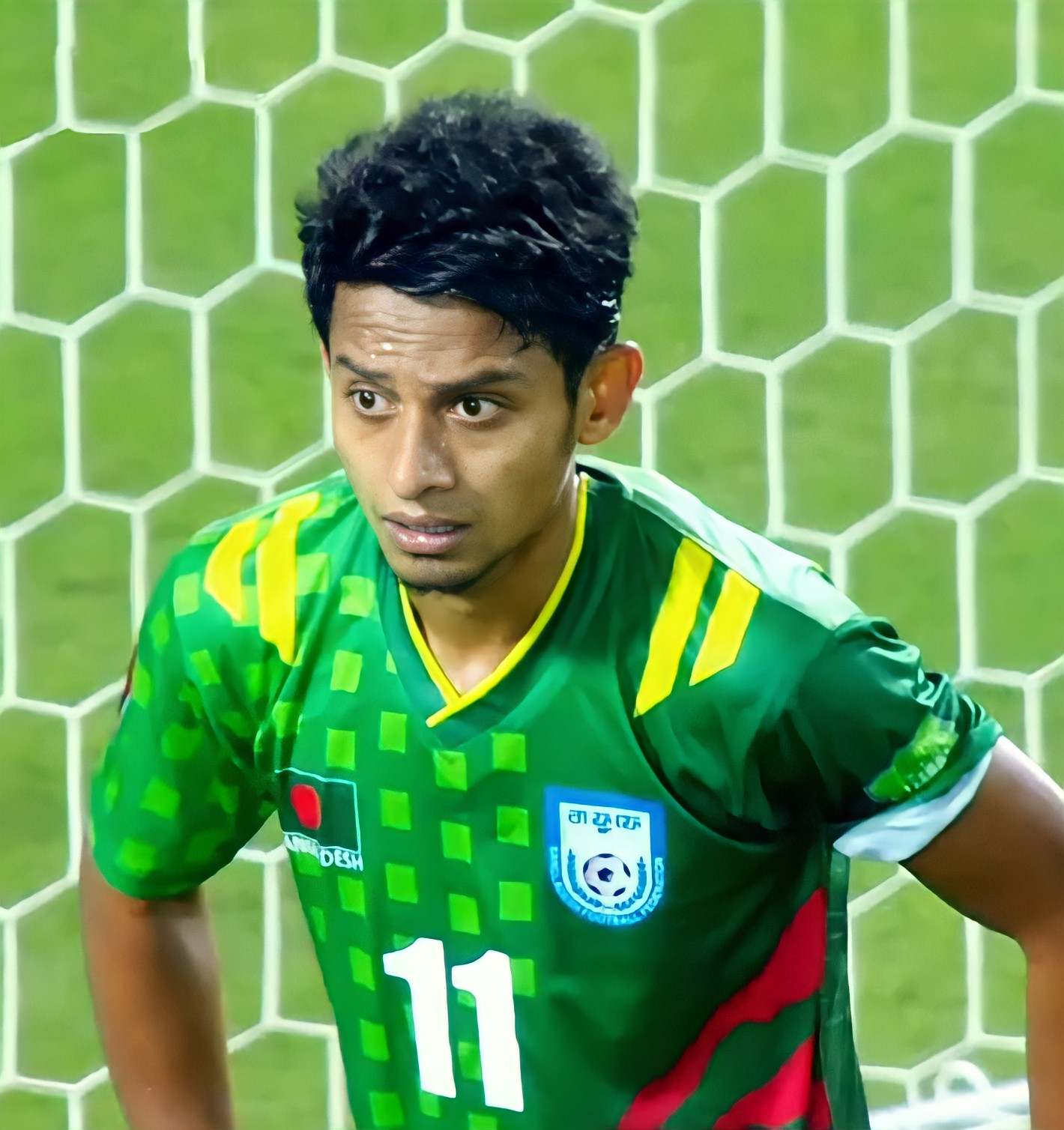
- Ibrahim with Bangladesh in 2021

Personal information
- Full name: Mohammad Ibrahim
- Date of birth: 7 August 1997 (age 29)
- Place of birth: Cox's Bazar, Bangladesh
- Height: 1.73 m (5 ft 8 in)
- Position: Right winger

Team information
- Current team: Fortis
- Number: 19

Youth career
- 2013: Muktijoddha

Senior career*
Years	Team	Apps	(Gls)
2011–2012	City Club		
2012–2013	Cox City		(0)
2013–2014	Muktijoddha		(2)
2013	→ Dhaka United (loan)		(1)
2014–2015	Mohammedan		(3)
2016	→ Sheikh Russel (loan)	0	(0)
2016	Chittagong Abahani	20	(5)
2017–2018	Saif	14	(2)
2018–2022	Bashundhara Kings	63	(6)
2022–2023	Sheikh Russel	18	(2)
2023–2024	Bashundhara Kings	6	(1)
2024–2026	Dhaka Abahani	30	(3)
2026	→ Fortis (loan)	0	(0)
2026–	Fortis	3	(3)

International career^{‡}
2015	Bangladesh U20	6	(0)
2019	Bangladesh U23	6	(0)
2018–	Bangladesh	45	(5)
- * Club domestic league appearances and goals as of 12 October 2026 ‡ National team caps and goals as of 14 November 2026

Mohammad Ibrahim (Bengali: মোহাম্মাদ ইব্রাহিম; born 7 August 1997) is a Bangladeshi professional footballer who plays as a winger for Bangladesh Football League club Fortis and the Bangladesh national team.

== Club career ==
Ibrahim began his career with City Club before joining his hometown club, Cox City, in the Bangladesh Championship League, where he won the 2011–12 BCL title. In 2013, Muktijoddha Sangsad KC invited him for a trial to form its Under-16 team. The team's then-coach, Shafiqul Islam Manik, appointed him captain of the U18 team, which finished as runners-up in the BFF U16 Tournament. In the same year, he was loaned to Dhaka United in the 2013 BCL, where the team was relegated. During his breakthrough season at Muktijoddha, Ibrahim scored two goals.

In 2014, Ibrahim joined Mohammedan and scored the winning goal against arch-rivals Dhaka Abahani in the 2014–15 BFL on 20 May 2015. The following year, he was loaned to Sheikh Russel KC for the 2017 AFC Cup qualifying round. In the same year, Ibrahim joined Chittagong Abahani and helped the club win the 2016 Independence Cup. Ibrahim joined Saif SC in 2017. Although he initially struggled to secure regular playing time, he scored the winning goal in a 2–1 victory over Sheikh Russel on 3 January 2018.

Ibrahim joined Bashundhara Kings ahead of the 2018–19 season after spending a year at Saif. He remained at the club for four seasons, scoring six league goals in 63 appearances and winning the league title three times. Following a season with Sheikh Russel, Ibrahim returned to Bashundhara Kings but saw limited playing time upon his return.

Ibrahim joined Dhaka Abahani in 2024. On 7 January 2025, he scored the winning goal for Abahani against Mohammedan in the 2024–25 Federation Cup, nearly ten years after scoring a similar goal for the opposing team.

In August 2026, Ibrahim joined Fortis on loan from Abahani for the club's AFC Challenge League campaign. He scored the only goal in a 1–0 victory over Kyrgyz club Muras United in the preliminary round, securing Fortis's place in the competition's group stage on its continental debut. Following his performance, Fortis signed him permanently ahead of the 2026–27 domestic season.

== International career ==
On 1 October 2018, Ibrahim made his senior national team debut against Laos during the 2018 Bangabandhu Cup.

On 19 January 2020, he scored his first international goal against Sri Lanka during the 2020 Bangabandhu Cup.

== Style of play ==
Ibrahim primarily plays as a winger, favouring the left wing, which he has described as his preferred position. He has also played as an attacking midfielder, as well as a striker for the national team. During the 2018–19 season, he was also deployed as a left-back by Bashundhara Kings coach Oscar Bruzon, recording around ten assists despite having fewer opportunities to score.

== Career statistics ==
=== International ===
As of 14 November 2026.

National team	Year	Apps	Goals
Bangladesh	2018	2	0
Bangladesh	2019	8	0
Bangladesh	2020	6	1
Bangladesh	2021	11	1
Bangladesh	2022	8	2
Bangladesh	2023	5	0
Bangladesh	2025	2	0
Bangladesh	2026	3	1
Total		45	5

==== International goals ====
Scores and results list Bangladesh's goal tally first.

No.	Date	Venue	Opponent	Score	Result	Competition
1.	19 January 2020	National Stadium, Dhaka, Bangladesh	Sri Lanka	3–0	3–0	2020 Bangabandhu Cup
2.	10 November 2021	Racecourse Ground, Colombo, Sri Lanka	Seychelles	1–0	1–1	2021 Mahinda Rajapaksa Trophy
3.	11 June 2022	Bukit Jalil National Stadium, Kuala Lumpur, Malaysia	Turkmenistan	1–1	1–2	2023 AFC Asian Cup qualification
4.	14 June 2022	Bukit Jalil National Stadium, Kuala Lumpur, Malaysia	Malaysia	1–1	1–4	2023 AFC Asian Cup qualification
5.	5 November 2026	National Stadium, Dhaka, Bangladesh	Bhutan	1–0	1–0	2026 SAFF Championship

== Honours ==
Cox City SC

- Bangladesh Championship League: 2012

Mohammedan SC

- Independence Cup: 2014

Chittagong Abahani

- Independence Cup: 2016

Bashundhara Kings

- Bangladesh Premier League: 2018–19, 2020–21, 2021–22, 2023–24
- Federation Cup: 2019–20, 2020–21
- Independence Cup: 2018–19, 2023–24
