= Hasan Murad Tipu =

Bangladeshi footballer

Hasan Murad
Personal information
- Full name: Mohammad Hasan Murad Tipu
- Date of birth: 2 January 1998 (age 28)
- Place of birth: Cox's Bazar, Bangladesh
- Height: 1.75 m (5 ft 9 in)
- Positions: Right-back; center-back

Team information
- Current team: Dhaka Abahani
- Number: 2

Senior career*
Years	Team	Apps	(Gls)
2017–	Bangladesh Army	0	(0)
2019–2022	Swadhinata	37	(2)
2022–2025	Mohammedan	26	(0)
2024–	Dhaka Abahani	11	(0)

International career^{‡}
2023	Bangladesh U23 (OA)	3	(0)
2023–	Bangladesh	2	(0)
- * Club domestic league appearances and goals as of 3 February 2024 ‡ National team caps and goals as of 16 November 2023

Hasan Murad Tipu (Bengali: হাসান মুরাদ টিপু born 2 January 1998) is a Bangladeshi professional footballer who plays as a defender for Bangladesh Premier League club Abahani Limited Dhaka and the Bangladesh national team. He is an active soldier for the Bangladesh Army.

== Club career ==
=== Early career ===
In 2013, Murad joined the Bangladesh Army after passing SSC with honors from Kutubdia Model High School and HSC from Kutubdia Government College. In 2016, he joined Kutubdia Players Association of Cox's Bazar. In 2017, he made his debut for the Army Football Team.

=== Swadhinata KS ===
In 2019, Murad joined Swadhinata KS while still being employed at the Bangladesh Army. In his second season, the club won promotion to the Bangladesh Premier League as champions of the 2021 Bangladesh Championship League.

=== Mohammedan SC ===
In October 2022, Murad joined Mohammedan SC. On 3 February 2023, he made his competitive debut for the club during a league fixture against Bashundhara Kings.

== International career ==
In May 2023, Murad was selected by Javier Cabrera for the 35-man preliminary squad for the 2023 SAFF Championship. However, his name was omitted from the 30-man squad which would attend the national camp in June 2023.

In July 2023, he was selected in the Olympic squad as one of the three over-aged players for the 2022 Asian Games, in Hangzhou, China. On 9 September 2023, Murad scored an own goal on his debut for Bangladesh U23 during a defeat to Myanmar U23 in the opening match of the 2022 Asian Games.

On 17 October 2023, Murad came on as a second-half substitute to make his senior international debut for Bangladesh during a 2–1 victory over Maldives in the 2026 FIFA World Cup qualification – AFC first round.

== Career statistics ==
As of 6 August 2023.

Appearances and goals by club, season and competition
Club	Season	League			Domestic Cup (Note: Appearance(s) in Bangladesh Federation Cup)		Other		Continental		Army		Total	
Club	Season	Division	Apps	Goals	Apps	Goals	Apps	Goals	Apps	Goals	Apps	Goals	Apps	Goals
Swadhinata	2018–19	Bangladesh Championship League	0	0	—		—		—		—		0	0
Swadhinata	2019–20	Bangladesh Championship League	21	2	—		—		—		—		21	2
Swadhinata	2020–21	Bangladesh Premier League	16	0	0	0	—		—		3 (Note: Appearance(s) in Bangladesh Independence Cup)	0	16	0
Swadhinata	Swadhinata total		37	2	0	0	0	0	0	0	—		37	2
Mohammedan	2021–22	Bangladesh Premier League	9	0	3	0	—		—		0	0	12	0
Mohammedan	2023–24	Bangladesh Premier League	0	0	0	0	—		—		2 (Note: Appearance(s) in Durand Cup)	0	0	0
Mohammedan	Mohammedan total		9	0	3	0	0	0	0	0	—		12	0
Career total			46	2	3	0	0	0	0	0	5	0	54	2

=== International ===
As of 16 November 2023.

Bangladesh national team
Year	Apps	Goals
2023	2	0
Total	2	0

== Honours ==
Mohammedan SC

- Federation Cup: 2022–23

Swadhinata KS

- Bangladesh Championship League: 2021

Bangladesh Army

- National Football Championship: 2020
