= Yeasin Khan =

Bangladeshi footballer

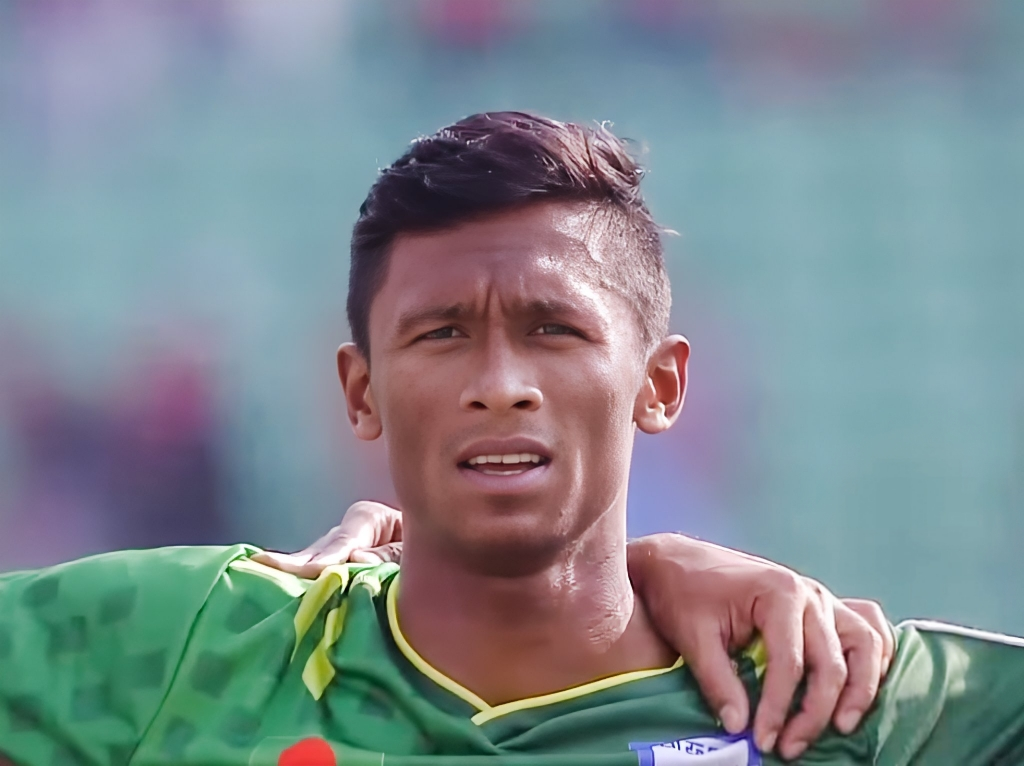
- Yeasin with Bangladesh at the 2015 SAFF Championship

Personal information
- Full name: Yeasin Khan
- Date of birth: 16 September 1994 (age 32)
- Place of birth: Barisal, Bangladesh
- Height: 1.78 m (5 ft 10 in)
- Position: Centre-back

Team information
- Current team: Dhaka Abahani
- Number: 4

Youth career
- 2007: Nobabpur KC

Senior career*
Years	Team	Apps	(Gls)
2009–2010	Victoria SC		
2010–2012	Mohammedan SC		
2012–2013	Sheikh Russel KC		
2014–2018	Sheikh Jamal DC		(2)
2019	Sheikh Russel KC	23	(0)
2020–2021	Bashundhara Kings	19	(0)
2021–2022	Sheikh Jamal DC	11	(0)
2022–2023	Sheikh Russel KC	8	(1)
2023–2024	Chittagong Abahani	16	(1)
2024–	Dhaka Abahani	9	(0)

International career^{‡}
2014–2017	Bangladesh U23	6	(0)
2014–	Bangladesh	32	(2)
- * Club domestic league appearances and goals as of 25 January 2025 ‡ National team caps and goals as of 10 November 2021

Yeasin Khan (Bengali: ইয়াসিন খান; born 16 September 1994) is a Bangladeshi footballer who plays as a defender for Bangladesh Premier League club Abahani Limited Dhaka and the Bangladesh national team.

== International goals ==
Scores and results list Bangladesh's goal tally first.

No.	Date	Venue	Opponent	Score	Result	Competition
1.	3 October 2019	Bangabandhu National Stadium, Dhaka	Bhutan	1–0	2–0	Friendly
2.	3 October 2019	Bangabandhu National Stadium, Dhaka	Bhutan	2–0	2–0	Friendly
