= Enamul Islam Gazi =

Bangladeshi footballer

Personal information
- Full name: Md Enamul Islam Gazi
- Date of birth: 12 October 2001 (age 25)
- Place of birth: Khulna, Bangladesh
- Height: 1.65 m (5 ft 5 in)
- Position: Midfielder

Team information
- Current team: City Club
- Number: 17

Youth career
- 2010–2015: Shams Ul Huda FA

Senior career*
Years	Team	Apps	(Gls)
2015–2016	Dilkusha SC		
2016–2017	Victoria SC		
2017–2018	Arambagh KS	0	(0)
2018–2023	Rahmatganj MFS	72	(6)
2023–2026	Dhaka Abahani	37	(6)
2026–	City Club	2	(1)

International career^{‡}
2021–2023	Bangladesh U23	6	(0)
- * Club domestic league appearances and goals as of 4 October 2026 ‡ National team caps and goals as of 12 September 2023

Enamul Islam Gazi (Bengali: এনামুল ইসলাম গাজী; born 12 October 2001) is a Bangladeshi professional footballer who plays as a midfielder for Bangladesh Premier League club City Club.

== Early career ==
Enamul joined Shams Ul Huda Football Academy in Jessore after participating in the 2010 Youth Nations Cup. Topu Tarafdar, a fellow footballer with experience playing professionally, played an integral role in Enamul's early career. In 2015, Enamul joined Dhaka based Dilkusha SC and finished the season as Dhaka Third Division League champion.

== Club career ==
In 2017, Enamul joined Victoria SC in the Bangladesh Championship League. Within a year of playing professionally, he secured a move to Bangladesh Premier League club Arambagh KS, in 2017. However, Enamul spent his first season in the top-tier without making a single appearance. In 2018, he signed for Rahmatganj MFS.

Gazi joined City Club for the 2026–27 Bangladesh Football League season.

== International career ==
In 2021, Enamul debuted for the Bangladesh U23 during the 2022 AFC U-23 Asian Cup qualifiers, held in Uzbekistan. He appeared in all three games as Bangladesh crashed out of the qualifiers bottom of their group. In 2023, he returned to the U23 team and made the final squad for the 2024 AFC U-23 Asian Cup qualifiers.

== Honours ==
Dilkusha SC

- Dhaka Third Division League: 2015
