= 2023–24 Rahmatganj MFS season =

Rahmatganj MFS 2023–24 football season

Rahmatganj MFS
2023–24 season
- Chairman: Haji Mohammad Salim
- Head coach: Sheikh Zahidur Rahman Milon
- Bangladesh Premier League: 9th of 10
- Federation Cup: Quarter-finals
- Independence Cup: Semi-finals
- Top goalscorer: League: Ernest Boateng (8 goals); All: Ernest Boateng (9 goals)
- Biggest win: 4–1 Vs Bangladesh Air Force (Neutral) 3 November 2023 (Independence Cup)
- Biggest defeat: 1–4 Vs Sheikh Jamal DC (Neutral) 23 January 2024 (Federation Cup)

The 2023–24 season was the Rahmatganj MFS's 91st season since its establishment in 1933 and its 14th season in the Bangladesh Premier League. In addition to domestic league, Rahmatganj were participated in this season's edition of Federation Cup and Independence Cup. This season were covered the period from 1 August 2023 to 31 May 2024.

== Players ==
=== Current squad ===
As of 6 April 2024

Rahmatganj MFS squad for 2023–24 season.

Note: Flags indicate national team as defined under FIFA eligibility rules; some limited exceptions apply. Players may hold more than one non-FIFA nationality.

No.	Pos.	Nation	Player
1	GK	BAN	Mohammed Mamun Alif
2	DF	UZB	Iskandar Siddikzhonov
3	DF	BAN	Md Rokey
4	DF	BAN	Istekharul Alam Shakil
5	DF	BAN	Md Tarek
6	MF	BAN	Arafat Hossain
7	MF	BAN	Md Sayde
8	MF	BAN	Anik Hossain
10	FW	GHA	Samuel Mensah Konney
11	FW	BAN	Khondoker Ashraful Islam
12	FW	BAN	Md Nahian
14	MF	BAN	Md Al Amin
15	DF	BAN	Sushanto Tripura (vice-captain)
16	MF	BAN	Nazmul Islam Rasel
17	DF	BAN	Md Soeb Mia
18	MF	GAM	Dawda Ceesay (captain)

No.	Pos.	Nation	Player
19	MF	BAN	Md Rajon Howleder
20	FW	BAN	Samin Yasir Juel
21	DF	BAN	Nurul Naium Faisal
22	GK	BAN	Shimul Kumar Das
23	FW	GHA	Ernest Boateng
24	MF	BAN	Rofiqul Islam Sumon
25	GK	BAN	Md Arman Hossain
26	FW	BAN	Murad Hossain Chowdhury
27	FW	BAN	Jewel Rana
28	FW	BAN	Mohammed Fahim Nur Toha
29	DF	BAN	Md Sagor Sarkar
30	GK	BAN	Md Nayem
31	FW	BAN	Md Emon Hossain
32	MF	BAN	Ridaynul Islam Sagor
33	MF	BAN	Tonmoy Das
77	MF	UZB	Ikhtiyor Tashpulatov
98	MF	EGY	Mostafa Kahraba

== Transfer ==
=== In ===
No.	Pos	Player	Previous club	Fee	Date	Source
30	GK	Md Nayem	Sheikh Jamal Dhanmodi	Free transfer	7 September 2023	
3	DF	Md Rokey	Chittagong Abahani	Free transfer	October 2023	
4	DF	Istekharul Alam Shakil	AFC Uttara	Free transfer	October 2023	
5	DF	Md Tarek	Chittagong Abahani	Free transfer	October 2023	
29	DF	Md Sagor Sarkar	Muktijoddha Sangsad	Free transfer	October 2023	
10	FW	(Ghana) Samuel Mensah Konney	(India) Gokulam Kerala	Free transfer	October 2023	
23	FW	(Ghana) Ernest Boateng	(India) Real Kashmir	Free transfer	October 2023	
2	DF	(Uzbekistan) Iskandar Siddikzhonov	(Kazakhstan) FK Arys	Free transfer	October 2023	
77	DF	(Uzbekistan) Ikhtiyor Tashpulatov	(Uzbekistan) PFK Metallurg Bekabad	Free transfer	October 2023	
18	MF	(The Gambia) Dawda Ceesay	(Vietnam) Becamex Binh Duong	Free transfer	October 2023	
6	MF	Arafat Hossain	Chittagong Abahani	Free transfer	October 2023	
8	MF	Anik Hossain	Chittagong Abahani	Free transfer	17 October 2023	
12	FW	Md Nahian	Chittagong Abahani	Free transfer	October 2023	
15	DF	Sushanto Tripura	Abahani Limited Dhaka	Free transfer	17 October 2023	
21	DF	Nurul Naium Faisal	Abahani Limited Dhaka	Free transfer	17 October 2023	
7	FW	Jewel Rana	Abahani Limited Dhaka	Free transfer	17 October 2023	
33	MF	Tonmoy Das	Abahani Limited Dhaka	Free transfer	17 October 2023	
98	MF	(Egypt) Mostafa Kahraba	Brothers Union	Free transfer	2 March 2024	

=== Out ===
No.	Pos	Player	Moved to	Fee	Date	Source
18	MF	(Tajikistan) Fatkhullo Fatkhulloyev	(Tajikistan) Eskhata Khujand	Free transfer	25 July 2023	
4	DF	(Uzbekistan) Shokhrukhbek Kholmatov	Bashundhara Kings	Free transfer	July 2023	
90	FW	(Nigeria) Peter Ebimobowei	(Turkey) Gençlik Gücü T.S.K.	Free transfer	1 August 2023	
45	FW	(Mali) Ulysse Diallo	Unattached	Released	1 August 2023	
5	DF	Tanvir Hossain	Sheikh Russel KC	Free transfer	1 August 2023	
12	MF	Enamul Islam Gazi	Abahani Limited Dhaka	Free transfer	1 September 2023	
15	MF	Akkas Ali	Sheikh Jamal Dhanmondi	Free transfer	1 October 2023	
16	MF	Fazlay Rabbi	Brothers Union	Free transfer	1 October 2023	
63	MF	(Uzbekistan) Bunyod Shodiev	Brothers Union	Free transfer	1 October 2023	
3	DF	Saddam Hossain Anny	Fortis FC	Free transfer	1 October 2023	
13	FW	Mohamed Iftekhar Munna	Sheikh Russel KC	Free transfer	1 October 2023	
17	DF	Noyon Mia	Fortis FC	Free transfer	1 October 2023	

== Competitions ==
Win Draw Loss Fixtures

=== Overall ===
Competition	First match	Last match	Final Position
BPL	22 December 2023	29 May 2024	9th
Federation Cup	26 December 2023	16 April 2024	Quarter-finals
Independence Cup	27 October 2023	15 December 2023	Semi-finals

=== Overview ===
Competition	Record							
Competition	Pld	W	D	L	GF	GA	GD	Win %
BPL	18	2	10	6	19	26	−7	11.11
Independence Cup	5	2	1	2	6	5	+1	40.00
Federation Cup	3	0	1	2	3	8	−5	0.00
Total	26	4	12	10	28	39	−11	15.38

Source: Competitions

=== Premier League ===
==== League table ====
Pos	Team	Pld	W	D	L	GF	GA	GD	Pts
6	Sheikh Russel KC	18	4	7	7	20	24	−4	19
7	Chittagong Abahani	18	4	7	7	22	29	−7	19
8	Sheikh Jamal DC	18	4	5	9	14	24	−10	17
9	Rahmatganj MFS	18	2	10	6	19	26	−7	16
10	Brothers Union	18	1	4	13	21	66	−45	7

Source: Soccerway
Rules for classification: 1) Points; 2) Goal difference; 3) Goals scored.

==== Results summary ====
Overall								Home						Away					
Pld	W	D	L	GF	GA	GD	Pts	W	D	L	GF	GA	GD	W	D	L	GF	GA	GD
18	2	10	6	19	26	−7	16	1	6	2	8	10	−2	1	4	4	11	16	−5

Source: Soccerway

==== Results by round ====
Round	1	2	3	4	5	6	7	8	9	10	11	12	13	14	15	16	17	18
Ground	A	H	H	A	H	A	H	A	A	H	A	A	H	H	H	A	H	H
Result	D	D	D	D	D	D	D	L	L	L	W	L	L	W	D	D	D	W
Position	6	7	6	5	6	5	6	8	9	9	8	9	9	9	9	9	9	9

Source: Matches
A = Away; H = Home; W = Win; D = Draw; L = Loss; P = Postponed

=== Matches ===
22 December 2024 1	Abahani Limited Dhaka	1–1	Rahmatganj MFS	Gopalganj
14:30 BST (UTC+6)	Fernandes 21'	Report	Istekharul Alam Shakil (yellow card) 17'; Ceesay (yellow card) 52'; Boateng 67' (yellow card) 70'; Jewel (yellow card) 78'	Stadium: Sheikh Fazlul Haque Mani Stadium; Referee: Md Alamgir Sarker

29 December 2024 2	Rahmatganj MFS	2–2	Brothers Union	Munshigonj
14:30 BST (UTC+6)	Boateng 25' (yellow card) 34'; Samin Yasir Juel 89'	Report	Valizhonov (pen.), 18'; Md Insan Hossain (yellow card) 31'; Sufil 67'; Kahraba (yellow card) 72'	Stadium: Shaheed Bir Sreshtho Flight Lieutenant Matiur Rahman Stadium; Referee: Golam Mourshed Chowdhury Nayan

12 January 2024 3	Rahmatganj MFS	1–1	Chittagong Abahani	Munshigonj
14:45 BST (UTC+6)	Md Soeb Mia (yellow card) 21'; Samuel Mensah Konney 55'	Report	Yeasin 34'	Stadium: Shaheed Bir Sreshtho Flight Lieutenant Matiur Rahman Stadium; Referee: Md Anisur Rahman

19 January 2024 4	Fortis FC	2–2	Rahmatganj MFS	Rajshahi
14:45 BST (UTC+6)	Jasur Jumaev 22'; Gryshyn (yellow card) 68'; Shanto Kumar Roy (yellow card) 71'; Pa Omar 82' (pen.)	Report	Ceesay 31'; Boateng 72' (pen.)	Stadium: Muktijuddho Sriti Stadium; Referee: Md Mizanur Rahman

27 January 2024 5	Rahmatganj MFS	0–0	Bangladesh Police FC	Munshigonj
14:45 BST (UTC+6)	Samuel Mensah Konney (yellow card) 17'; Md Rokey (yellow card) 33'; Md Al Amin (yellow card) 72'; Ceesay (yellow card) 77'	Report	Emon (yellow card) 58'; Mateo Palacios (yellow card) 66'	Stadium: Shaheed Bir Sreshtho Flight Lieutenant Matiur Rahman Stadium; Referee: Bituraj Barua

2 February 2024 6	Sheikh Russel KC	0–0	Rahmatganj MFS	Dhaka
15:00 BST (UTC+6)	Marma (yellow card) 18'; Mohammad Sagor Miah (yellow card) 26'	Report	Md Tarek (yellow card) 27'; Sushanto (yellow card) 48'	Stadium: Bashundhara Kings Arena; Referee: Golam Mourshed Chowdhury Nayon

9 February 2024 7	Rahmatganj MFS	1–1	Mohammedan SC	Munshigonj
15:00 BST (UTC+6)	Ceesay 27' (yellow card) 84'; Arafat (yellow card) 30'; Al Amin (yellow card) 84'; Nayeem (yellow card) 90+9'	Report	Muzaffarov 86' (pen.)	Stadium: Shaheed Bir Sreshtho Flight Lieutenant Matiur Rahman Stadium; Referee: Md Saymoon Hasan Sany

16 February 2024 8	Bashundhara Kings	4–1	Rahmatganj MFS	Dhaka
17:15 BST (UTC+6)	Rakib 25'; Bishwanath (yellow card) 33'; Figueira 55'; Dorielton 90+3'; Robinho 90+8' (pen.)	Report	Boateng 10'; Md Rockey (yellow card) 51'	Stadium: Bashundhara Kings Arena; Referee: Md Jalal Uddin

23 February 2024 9	Sheikh Jamal DC	2–1	Rahmatganj MFS	Gopalganj
15:00 BST (UTC+6)	Sazzad (yellow card) 32'; Higor 40'; Shokhrukhbek Kholmatov 64' (yellow card) 90+3'; Al Amin (yellow card) 88'; Piash (yellow card) 90+3'	Report	Samuel Mensah Konney 20'; Anik Hossain (yellow card) 45+1'; Sushanto (yellow card) 73'; Ikhtiyor Tashpulatov (yellow card) 90+2'; Ceesay (yellow card) 90+4'	Stadium: Sheikh Fazlul Haque Mani Stadium; Referee: Md Anisur Rahman Sagor

30 March 2024 10	Rahmatganj MFS	0–3	Abahani Limited Dhaka	Munshigonj
15:15 BST (UTC+6)	Samuel Mensah Konney (yellow card) 90+3'	Report	Jamal (yellow card) 42'; Washington 49'; Stewart 59'; Fernandes 63'	Stadium: Shaheed Bir Sreshtho Flight Lieutenant Matiur Rahman Stadium; Referee: Bituraj Barua

5 April 2024 11	Brothers Union	0–2	Rahmatganj MFS	Rajshahi
15:15 BST (UTC+6)	Md Munno Mia (yellow card) 35'; Md Insan Hossain (yellow card) 64'	Report	Kahraba 44'; Sushanto (yellow card) 46'; Boateng (yellow card) 37' (goal) 85'	Stadium: Muktijuddho Sriti Stadium; Referee: Mahmud Zamal Farouqee Nahid

20 April 2024 12	Chittagong Abahani	2–1	Rahmatganj MFS	Munshigonj
15:15 BST (UTC+6)	Paul Komolafe 15' (yellow card) 49'; Raihan 48'; Ashraful (yellow card) 88'; Shakil Ali (yellow card) 90+6'	Report	Mostafa (yellow card) 20'; Boateng 57' (pen.) (yellow card) 75'	Stadium: Shaheed Bir Sreshtho Flight Lieutenant Matiur Rahman Stadium; Referee: Saymoon Hasan Sany

26 April 2024 13	Rahmatganj MFS	1–2	Fortis FC	Munshigonj
15:45 BST (UTC+6)	Samuel Mensah; Konney 50' (pen.)	Report	Rashedul Islam Rashed 26'; Pa Omar 37' (penalty missed) 42; Noyon Mia (yellow card) 49'	Stadium: Shaheed Bir Sreshtho Flight Lieutenant Matiur Rahman Stadium; Referee: Md Mizanur Rahman

4 May 2024 14	Bangladesh Police FC	2–0	Rahmatganj MFS	Mymensingh
15:45 BST (UTC+6)	Sahed Hosaain Miah 72'; Edward Morillo 83'; Sokhibov (yellow card) 86'; Mohammad Emon (yellow card) 90+1'	Report	Iskandar Siddikzhonov (yellow card) 45'	Stadium: Rafiq Uddin Bhuiyan Stadium; Referee: Bituraj Barua

10 May 2024 15	Rahmatganj MFS	1–1	Sheikh Russel KC	Munshigonj
16:00 BST (UTC+6)	Boateng 55'	Report	Vojislav Balabanovic 62'	Stadium: Shaheed Bir Sreshtho Flight Lieutenant Matiur Rahman Stadium; Referee: Md Mizanur Rahman

17 May 2024 16	Mohammedan SC	3–3	Rahmatganj MFS	Mymensingh
16:00 BST (UTC+6)	Jafar 5'; Diabate 21', 97' (yellow card) 84'; Emon (yellow card) 70'	Report	Ikhtiyor Tashpulatov (yellow card) 10'; Boateng 34'; Samuel Mensah Konney 41' (pen.), 65'; Sushanto (yellow card) 85'	Stadium: Rafiq Uddin Bhuiyan Stadium; Referee: Bituraj Barua

25 May 2024 17	Rahmatganj MFS	0–0	Bashundhara Kings	Munshigonj
16:00 BST (UTC+6)		Report	Figueira (yellow card) 15'; Jahid (yellow card) 40'; Bishwanath (yellow card) 75'	Stadium: Shaheed Bir Sreshtho Flight Lieutenant Matiur Rahman Stadium; Referee: Md Alamgir Sarker

29 May 2024 18	Rahmatganj MFS	2–0	Sheikh Jamal DC	Munshigonj
16:00 BST (UTC+6)	Istekharul Alam Shakil (yellow card) 11'; Boateng 50'; Samuel Mensah Konney 71' (pen.)	Report	Shakil (red card) 68'; Pritom (yellow card) 68'; Shokhrukhbek Kholmatov (yellow card) 90'	Stadium: Shaheed Bir Sreshtho Flight Lieutenant Matiur Rahman Stadium; Referee: Kasun Lakmal

=== Independence Cup ===
==== Group stages ====
Pos	Team	Pld	W	D	L	GF	GA	GD	Pts	Qualification
1	Abahani Limited Dhaka	3	3	0	0	6	0	+6	9	Advance to Knockout stage
2	Rahmatganj MFS	3	1	1	1	4	3	+1	4	Advance to Knockout stage
3	Sheikh Russel KC	3	1	1	1	1	2	−1	4	
4	Bangladesh Air Force	3	0	0	3	1	7	−6	0	

Source: GSA
Rules for classification: Group stage tiebreakers

27 October 2023	Sheikh Russel KC	0–0	Rahmatganj MFS	Dhaka
14:30 BST (UTC+6)		Report	Istekharul Alam Shakil (yellow card) 9' (yellow-red card) 47'	Stadium: Bashundhara Kings Arena; Referee: Md Mizanur Rahman

30 October 2023	Rahmatganj MFS	0–2	Abahani Limited Dhaka	Dhaka
18:00 BST (UTC+6)	Md Emon Hossain (yellow card) 50'; Md Nahian (yellow card) 57'	Report	Stewart 76'; Fernandes 83'	Stadium: Bashundhara Kings Arena; Referee: Md Saymoon Hasan Sany

3 November 2023	Rahmatganj MFS	4–1	Bangladesh Air Force	Munshiganj
14:30 BST (UTC+6)	Murad Hossain Chowdhury 33'; Samin Yasir Juel 44', 55'; Rofiqul Islam Sumon 90+4'	Report	Juwel Miah 32'	Stadium: Shaheed Bir Sreshtho Flight Lieutenant Matiur Rahman Stadium; Referee: Bituraj Barua

==== Knockout stages ====
3 December 2023 Quarter-finals	Bangladesh Police FC	1–2	Rahmatganj MFS	Dhaka
14:30 BST (UTC+6)	Edis Ibargüen García (pen.), 23'	Report	Samuel Mensah Konney 29', 31'	Stadium: Bashundhara Kings Arena; Referee: Md Jalal Uddin

15 December 2023 Semi-finals	Rahmatganj MFS	0–1	Mohammedan SC	Gopalganj
13:45 BST (UTC+6)		Report	Muzaffar Muzaffarov 72'	Stadium: Sheikh Fazlul Haque Mani Stadium; Referee: Bituraj Barua

=== Federation Cup ===
==== Group stages ====
Pos	Team	Pld	W	D	L	GF	GA	GD	Pts	Qualification
1	Sheikh Jamal DC	2	1	1	0	6	3	+3	4	Advance to Knockout stage
2	Bangladesh Police FC	2	0	2	0	4	4	0	2	Advance to Knockout stage
3	Rahmatganj MFS	2	0	1	1	3	6	−3	1	Qualified as a best third place team to Knockout stage

Source: Soccerway
Rules for classification: Group stages tiebreakers

26 December 2023	Rahmatganj MFS	2–2	Bangladesh Police FC	Munshigonj
14:00 BST (UTC+6)	Samuel Mensah Konney 41'; Boateng 77' (pen.)	Report	Sahed Miah 19'; Edis Ibargüen García 68' (pen.)	Stadium: Shaheed Bir Sreshtho Flight Lieutenant Matiur Rahman Stadium; Referee: Md Mizanur Rahman

23 January 2024	Rahmatganj MFS	1–4	Sheikh Jamal DC	Dhaka
14:45 BST (UTC+6)	Ceesay 90+2' (pen.)	Report	Dimgba 19'; Fahim 31', 90+4'; Sazzad 86'	Stadium: Bashundhara Kings Arena; Referee: Bituraj Barua

==== Knockout stages ====
16 April 2024 Quarter-finals	Bashundhara Kings	2–0	Rahmatganj MFS	Gopalganj
15:00 BST (UTC+6)	Sohel 24'; Mfon 62'	Report		Stadium: Sheikh Fazlul Haque Mani Stadium; Referee: Golam Mourshed Chowdhury Nayon

== Statistics ==
=== Goalscorers ===
As of 29 May 2024

Rank	Player	Position	Total	BPL	Independence Cup	Federation Cup
1	(Ghana) Ernest Boateng	FW	10	9	0	1
2	(Ghana) Samuel Mensah Konney	FW	8	5	2	1
3	(Bangladesh) Samin Yasir Juel	FW	3	1	2	0
3	(The Gambia) Dawda Ceesay	MF	3	2	0	1
4	(Bangladesh) Murad Hossain Chowdhury	FW	1	0	1	0
4	(Bangladesh) Rofiqul Islam Sumon	MF	1	0	1	0
4	(Egypt) Mostafa Kahraba	MF	1	1	0	0
Total			27	18	6	3
