= 2025–26 Fakirerpool Young Men's Club season =

Fakirerpool Young Men's Club 2025–26 football season

Fakirerpool YMC
2025–26 season
- President: Anwar Hossain Makhon
- Head coach: Albert Lyapin
- Stadium: Shaheed Miraj–Tapan Stadium
- Football League: 10th of 10 (Relegated)
- Federation Cup: Group stage
- Top goalscorer: League: Ouattara Ben Ibrahim (3 goals); All: Ouattara Ben Ibrahim (3 goals)
- Biggest win: 2–0 Vs Mohammedan SC (Home); Football League; 29 November 2025
- Biggest defeat: 1–7 Vs Fortis FC (Home); Football League; 8 May 2026

The 2025–26 season was Fakirerpool Young Men's Club's 65th season in existence and 2nd season in the Bangladesh Football League.In addition to the domestic league, Fakirerpool participated in this season's Federation Cup. The season covers the period from 1 June 2025 to 23 May 2026.

== Current squad ==
As of 20 May 2025

Note: Flags indicate national team as defined under FIFA eligibility rules; some limited exceptions apply. Players may hold more than one non-FIFA nationality.

No.	Pos.	Nation	Player
1	GK	BAN	Tayeb Siddique
2	DF	BAN	Md Mosharaf Hossain Shanto
3	DF	BAN	Jintu Mia
5	DF	BAN	Raficul Islam (Captain)
11	FW	BAN	Mehedi Hasan Hridoy
12	FW	BAN	Md Bappi Hasan
13	DF	BAN	Md Sabbir Hossain
14	MF	BAN	Shiblal Tudo
15	MF	BAN	Md Sumon Islam
16	DF	BAN	Yeasin Mia Rajib
17	DF	BAN	Amit Hasan
18	FW	BAN	Md Sayed Hossen Sayem
19	FW	BAN	Anik Hossain Siam
20	MF	BAN	Shanto Tudo
21	MF	BAN	Mehedi Hasan Polash

No.	Pos.	Nation	Player
22	DF	BAN	Md Rakib Rahman
23	MF	BAN	Md Arifur Rahman Shemanto
24	FW	BAN	Md Ifran Hossain
25	GK	BAN	Md Shaju Ahmed
26	DF	BAN	Md Sagor Hossain
27	MF	BAN	Md Shiab Mia
33	DF	BAN	Tias Das
39	DF	BAN	Tamim Ahammed
49	FW	BAN	Mohammad Jahedul Alam
55	DF	BAN	Md Rasel Hossain
59	DF	MLI	Abu Mohamed Fofona
66	MF	BAN	Md Jahid Hossain
69	FW	CIV	Ouattara Ben Ibrahim
77	FW	BAN	Rafayel Tudu
88	FW	BAN	Dalim Barman

=== Preseason friendly ===
10 September 2025	Abahani Limited Dhaka	2–0	Fakirerpool Young Men's Club	Dhaka
15:00 BST (UTC+6)				Stadium: Bangladesh Army Stadium; Referee: Saymoon Hasan Sany

== Transfer ==
=== In ===
No.	Pos	Player	Previous club	Fee	Date	Source
	DF	(Bangladesh) Khorshed Alam	(Bangladesh) AFC Uttara	Free	1 August 2025	
	MF	(Egypt) Mostafa Kahraba	(Bangladesh) Rahmatganj MFS	Free	13 August 2025	
	FW	(Bangladesh) Mohamed Shadhin	(Bangladesh) Chittagong Abahani Limited	Free	14 August 2025	
	FW	(Bangladesh) (Italy) Bishal Das	Free agent	Free	10 August 2025	
	FW	(Bangladesh) Habib Ullah	(Bangladesh) Mohammedan SC			

=== Out ===
No.	Pos	Player	Moved to	Fee	Date	Source
10	MF	(Uzbekistan) Sardor Jakhonov	(Afghanistan) Abu Muslim FC	Free	1 July 2025	
77	FW	(Bangladesh) Rafayel Tudu	(Bangladesh) Mohammedan SC	Free	1 July 2025	
1	GK	(Bangladesh) Tayeb Siddique	(Bangladesh) Mohammedan SC	Free	18 July 2025	

== Competitions ==
=== Overall ===
Competition	First match	Last match	Final Position
BFL	26 September 2025	23 May 2026	10th of 10
Federation Cup	24 October 2025	28 April 2026	Group stage

=== Overview ===
Competition	Record							
Competition	Pld	W	D	L	GF	GA	GD	Win %
BFL	18	2	4	12	13	44	−31	11.11
Federation Cup	4	0	0	4	2	7	−5	0.00
Total	22	2	4	16	15	51	−36	9.09

Source: Competitions

=== Premier League ===
==== League table ====
Pos	Team	Pld	W	D	L	GF	GA	GD	Pts
6	Rahmatganj	18	6	5	7	21	25	−4	23
7	Brothers Union	18	4	5	9	18	29	−11	17
8	PWD	18	4	5	9	15	28	−13	17
9	Arambagh	18	3	5	10	12	28	−16	14
10	Fakirerpool	18	2	4	12	13	44	−31	10

Source: Soccerway
Rules for classification: 1) Points; 2) Goal difference; 3) Number of goals scored.

==== Results summary ====
Overall								Home						Away					
Pld	W	D	L	GF	GA	GD	Pts	W	D	L	GF	GA	GD	W	D	L	GF	GA	GD
18	2	4	12	13	42	−29	10	1	2	6	8	25	−17	1	2	6	5	17	−12

Source: Soccerway

==== Results by round ====
Round	1	2	3	4	5	6	7	8	9	10	11	12	13	14	15	16	17	18
Ground	H	H	A	H	A	H	A	A	H	A	A	H	A	H	A	H	H	A
Result	D	L	L	D	D	L	L	W	D	D	L	L	L	L	L	L	L	L
Position	6	9	10	9	8	8	10	8	8	8	8	9	10	10	10	10	10	10

Source: Matches
A = Away; H = Home; W = Win; D = Draw; L = Loss; P = Postponed

==== Matches ====
26 September 2025 1	Fakirerpool YMC	1–1	Arambagh KS	Manikganj
14:45 BST (UTC+6)	Mosharaf Hossain Shanto (yellow card) 45'; M. Kahraba (yellow card) 45+5' (goal) 90+1'	Report	Mohammed Obaidullah (yellow card) 45+5'; Yaya John Denapo 58'	Stadium: Shaheed Miraj–Tapan Stadium; Referee: Bhubon Mohon Tarafder

19 October 2025 2	Fakirerpool YMC	0–2	Rahmatganj MFS	Manikganj
14:45 BST (UTC+6)	Abu Mohamed Fofona (yellow card) 42'; Shanto Tudo (yellow card) 58'	Report	Clement Adu (yellow card) 45+1' (goal) 52'; J. Ahmed (yellow card) 57'; Mohamed Munna (yellow card) 84'; R. Howladar 90+7'	Stadium: Shaheed Miraj–Tapan Stadium; Referee: Bhubon Mohon Tarafder

24 November 2025 3	Brothers Union	2–0	Fakirerpool YMC	Munshiganj
14:45 BST (UTC+6)	S. Shrestha 81'; A. Bista 84'	Report	Pronoy Innocent Marandi (yellow card) 52'; Md Saju Ahamed (yellow card) 82'	Stadium: Shaheed Bir Sreshtho Flight Lieutenant Matiur Rahman Stadium; Referee: Bituraj Barua

29 November 2025 4	Fakirerpool YMC	2–0	Mohammedan SC	Manikganj
14:30 BST (UTC+6)	Md Ifran Hossain 46'; Ouattara Ben Ibrahim 61'	Report	Saiful Hossain (yellow card) 12'; Sourav Dewan (yellow card) 17'	Stadium: Shaheed Miraj–Tapan Stadium; Referee: Sabuj Kumar Das

6 December 2025 5	Bangladesh Police FC	1–1	Fakirerpool YMC	Gazipur
14:30 BST (UTC+6)	D. Quipapá (yellow card) 25'; O. Teshering (yellow card) 61'; I. Faysal 90+6'; P. Henrique (yellow card) 90+7'	Report	Mohammad Arian Hossain 31'; M. Kahraba (yellow card) 55'	Stadium: Shaheed Barkat Stadium; Referee: Mohammed Jalal Uddin

13 December 2025 6	Fakirerpool YMC	0–5	Abahani Limited Dhaka	Manikganj
14:30 BST (UTC+6)	Md Shihab Mia (yellow card) 89'	Report	S. Diabate 32', 41'; S. Tripura (yellow card) 35'; M. Islam 43'; S. Morsalin 79'; Al-Amin 86'	Stadium: Shaheed Miraj–Tapan Stadium; Referee: SM Jashim Akhter

20 December 2025 7	Fortis FC	3–0	Fakirerpool YMC	Dhaka
14:30 BST (UTC+6)	P. Babou 8', 54'; Riaj Uddin Sagor 19'; S. Rony (yellow card) 36'	Report		Stadium: Bashundhara Kings Arena; Referee: Md Junayed Sharif

27 December 2025 8	PWD Sports Club	1–2	Fakirerpool YMC	Gazipur
14:30 BST (UTC+6)	Sumon Kumar Das (yellow card) 24'; Rashedul Islam Rashed 73'; Minhazul Karim Shadin 80'; Jamir Uddin (yellow card) 88'	Report	Ouattara Ben Ibrahim 20'; Abu Mohamed Fofona (yellow card) 35'; Mohammed Arian Hossain 45'; Shihab Mia (red card) 50'	Stadium: Shaheed Barkat Stadium; Referee: Junayed Sharif

3 January 2026 9	Fakirerpool YMC	3–3	Bashundhara Kings	Manikganj
14:30 BST (UTC+6)	Nazrul Islam Sumon (yellow card) 21'; Md Jahid Hossain 77'; Md Irfan Hossain 84'; Ben Ibrahim Ouattara 90'	Report	S. Uddin 23'; Dorielton 25', 29'	Stadium: Shaheed Miraj–Tapan Stadium; Referee: Md Jashim Akther

6 March 2025 10	Arambagh KS	1–1	Fakirerpool YMC	Manikganj
14:45 BST (UTC+6)	Mohammed Jahedul Alam (yellow card) 51'; K. Kazito 79'; Shadrach Lantei-Mills (yellow card) 87'	Report	Shihab Mia (yellow card) 15'; Louis Lansana Beavogui 83' (pen.)	Stadium: Shaheed Miraj-Tapan Stadium; Referee: Bituraj Barua

13 March 2025 11	Rahmatganj MFS	3–0	Fakirerpool YMC	Munshiganj
14:45 BST (UTC+6)	S. Kanform 40'; Rafiqul Islam 72'; E. Boateng 84'	Report	M. Kahraba (yellow card) 20'	Stadium: Shaheed Bir Sreshtho Flight Lieutenant Matiur Rahman Stadium; Referee: Md Nasrir Uddin

10 April 2025 12	Fakirerpool YMC	0–2	Brothers Union	Manikganj
15:30 BST (UTC+6)	Tias Das (yellow card) 35'; Md Shihab Mia (yellow card) 54'; Shanto Tudu (yellow card) 71'	Report	Shayak Dost (yellow card) 37'; Shayak Dost 53', 82'	Stadium: Shaheed Miraj-Tapan Stadium; Referee: Md Nasir Uddin

17 April 2026 13	Mohammedan SC	3–0	Fakirerpool YMC	Cumilla
15:30 BST (UTC+6)	Md Joy Ahamed 60'; R. Mia (yellow card) 86'; Saiful Hossain (yellow card) 89'; J. Rana 90+1'; Rafayel Tudu 90+6'	Report	Tias Das (yellow card) 42'; Pronoy Enosent Marandi (yellow card) 90+2'	Stadium: Shaheed Dhirendranath Datta Stadium; Referee: Mahmud Zamal Farouqee Nahid

25 April 2026 14	Fakirerpool YMC	1–3	Bangladesh Police FC	Manikganj
15:30 BST (UTC+6)	Pronoy Innocent Marandi (yellow card) 6'; Md Mehedi Hasan Hridoy (yellow card) 45+1'; Md Shadin 60'	Report	P. Henrique 6', 40'; Ismail Hossen (yellow card) 22'; S. Kagimu 78'; Anik Hossain (yellow card) 81'	Stadium: Shaheed Miraj-Tapan Stadium

1 May 2026 15	Abahani Limited Dhaka	2–0	Fakirerpool YMC	Cumilla
15:30 BST (UTC+6)	E. Ogbugh 39'; S. Morsalin 68'	Report	Amit Hasan (yellow card) 87'	Stadium: Shaheed Dhirendranath Datta Stadium; Referee: Md Anisur Rahman Sagor

8 May 2026 16	Fakirerpool YMC	1–7	Fortis FC	Gazipur
15:45 BST (UTC+6)	Ouattara Ben Ibrahim 19'	Report	P. Babou 6', 43', 45+7', 88'; A. Tamang 48'; O. Okafor 55', 67'	Stadium: Shaheed Barkat Stadium; Referee: Sabuj Das

15 May 2026 17	Fakirerpool YMC	0–1	PWD Sports Club	Gazipur
15:45 BST (UTC+6)	Shanto Tudu (yellow card) 13'	Report	M. Abdullah (yellow card) 65'; Md Abu Sayed 90+5' (yellow card) 90+5'	Stadium: Shaheed Barkat Stadium; Referee: Md Symoon Hasan Sany

23 May 2026 18	Bashundhara Kings	4–1	Fakirerpool YMC	Dhaka
15:45 BST (UTC+6)	Dorielton 36', 74'; M. Jony 39' (yellow card) 40'; S. Emon 62'	Report	Ouattara Ben Ibrahim 28'	Stadium: Bashundhara Kings Arena; Referee: Anisur Rahman Sagor

=== Group A ===
Pos	Team	Pld	W	D	L	GF	GA	GD	Pts	Qualification
1	Brothers Union	4	3	1	0	5	0	+5	10	Qualified for QRF 1
2	Rahmatganj	4	1	3	0	3	1	+2	6	Advanced to QRF 2
3	PWD SC	4	2	0	2	3	5	−2	6	
4	Dhaka Abahani	4	1	1	2	5	5	0	4	
5	Fakirerpool	4	0	1	3	2	7	−5	1	

Source: Sofascore

24 October 2025	Dhaka Abahani	4–2	Fakirerpool YMC	Dhaka
14:45 BST (UTC+6)	Diabate 6', 40' (pen.); Morsalin 35', 63'	Report	Shanto Tudu 51'; Mohammad Riyad 69'	Stadium: Bashundhara Kings Arena; Referee: SM Jashim Akhter

9 December 2025	Fakirerpool YMC	0–2	PWD Sports Club	Dhaka
14:30 BST (UTC+6)		Report	A. Turaev 37' (pen.); Mohammed Sharif 65'	Stadium: Bashundhara Kings Arena; Referee: SM Jashim Akhter

14 April 2026	Fakirerpool YMC	0–1	Brothers Union	Comilla
14:45 BST (UTC+6)		Report	H. Khattak 71'	Stadium: Shaheed Dhirendranath Datta Stadium; Referee: Md Nasrir Uddin

28 April 2026	Fakirerpool YMC	0–0	Rahmatganj MFS	Cumilla
14:45 BST (UTC+6)		Report		Stadium: Shaheed Dhirendranath Datta Stadium; Referee: Md Symoon Hasan Sany

== Statistics ==
=== Goalscorers ===
As of 23 May 2026

Rank	Player	Position	Total	BFL	Federation Cup
1	(Ivory Coast) Ouattara Ben Ibrahim	FW	5	5	0
2	(Bangladesh) Mohammad Arian Hossain	FW	2	2	0
2	(Bangladesh) Md Irfan Hossain	FW	2	2	0
3	(Bangladesh) Shanto Tudu	MF	1	0	1
3	(Bangladesh) Mohammad Riyad	FW	1	0	1
3	(Bangladesh) Md Shadin	FW	1	1	0
3	(Bangladesh) Md Jahid Hossain	MF	1	1	0
3	(Egypt) Mostafa Kahraba	MF	1	1	0
3	(Mali) Louis Lansana Beavogui	FW	1	1	0
Total			15	13	2
