= 2026–27 Chattogram City FC season =

Chattogram City FC 2026–27 football season

Chattogram City
2026–27 season
- Owner: Muhammad Nazim Uddin
- Head coach: Julio Moreno Rayneld-Franco
- Stadium: Munshiganj Stadium
- Football League: TBD
- Federation Cup: TBD
Home colours	Away colours
- All statistics correct as of 18 September 2026.

The 2026–27 season is Chattogram City's 16th season in existence and 1st season in the Bangladesh Football League. In addition to the domestic league, Chattogram City will participate in this season's Federation Cup. The season covers the period from 1 June 2026 to April 2027.

== Current squad ==
As of 25 January 2026

Note: Flags indicate national team as defined under FIFA eligibility rules; some limited exceptions apply. Players may hold more than one non-FIFA nationality.

No.	Pos.	Nation	Player
1	GK	BAN	Showkat Hossen Hasan
2	DF	BAN	Prakas Das
3	DF	BAN	Khorshed Alam
4	DF	BAN	Md Rasel Hossain (Captain)
5	DF	BAN	Md Shahjan Ali
6	MF	BAN	Md Rafiqul Islam Sumon
7	MF	BAN	Saker Ullah
9	FW	BAN	Didarul Islam Soinik
10	FW	BAN	Md Amiruzzaman Saymon
11	FW	BAN	Md Shafikul Islam
12	MF	BAN	Md Roman
14	DF	BAN	Mohammad Nizam Uddin
17	MF	BAN	Mohammad Aashik
18	MF	BAN	Touhidul Islam
20	FW	BAN	Md Nizam Uddin
22	GK	BAN	Md Nasrul Islam Hero
24	DF	BAN	Md Abu Rayhan Shaown

No.	Pos.	Nation	Player
25	DF	BAN	Ushaching Marma
26	MF	BAN	Md Tanveer Hossain
27	MF	BAN	Tasrif Ullah Nishad
28	FW	BAN	Md Shofiul Alam Badhon
30	GK	BAN	Md Momanul Haque Maheun
33	DF	BAN	Md Hafizur Rahman
34	FW	BAN	Md Zakirul Islam
35	MF	BAN	Saad Bin Alam
42	DF	BAN	Hriduan Ahmed Polok
44	DF	BAN	Rubel Mia
45	MF	BAN	Md Asadur Jaman Ataul
49	MF	BAN	Mohammad Atiqur Rahman
66	MF	BAN	Moinul Islam
67	DF	BAN	Syed Shadman Saif
77	GK	BAN	Md Iftar Bin Farhad
98	MF	BAN	Md Ridoy Hawladar
99	DF	BAN	Md Nizam Uddin Mithu

== Transfer ==
=== In ===
Pos	Player	Previous club	Fee	Date	Source
FW	(Bangladesh) Md Minhazul Karim Shadin	(Bangladesh) PWD Sports Club	Free Transfer	23 July 2026	
DF	(Bangladesh) Asadul Islam Sakib	Bangladesh Police FC	Free agent	25 July 2026	
FW	(Bangladesh) Sumon Reza	(Bangladesh) Abahani Limited Dhaka	Free agent	25 July 2026	
MF	(Bangladesh) Md Shahidul Islam Sumon	(Bangladesh) Arambagh KS	Free agent	26 July 2026	
DF	(Germany) Flodyn Baloki	(Kyrgyzstan) FC Bishkek City	Unattached	7 August 2026	
FW	(Brazil) Denilson Rodrigues Roldão	(Indonesia) PSIS Semarang	Unattached	7 August 2026	
LW	(Japan) Kenta Hara	(Thailand) Pattaya United FC	Unattached	16 August 2026	
LW	(Bangladesh) Radowan Hasan	(Bangladesh) Suktara Jubo Sangsad	Unattached	20 August 2026	
MF	(Nepal) Ashish Sonam	(Nepal) Chitlang FC	Unattached	20 August 2026	
CB	(Nepal) Diwakar Chaudhary	(Nepal) Machhindra FC	Unattached	20 August 2026	
FW	(Nigeria) Raphael Onwrebe	(Lebanon) Racing Club Beirut	Unattached	20 August 2026	
DF	(Ghana) Kofi Junior Dabanka	(Bangladesh) PWD Sports Club	Unattached	2 September 2026	
DF	(Bangladesh) Md Shakir Ahmed	(Bangladesh) Abahani Limited Dhaka	Free agent	2 September 2026	

=== Out ===
Pos	Player	Moved to	Fee	Date	Source
ST	(Bangladesh) Md Halim	(Bangladesh) Brothers Union	Free agent	5 September 2026	

=== Overall ===
Win Draw Loss Fixtures

Competition	First match	Last match	Final Position
BFL	18 September 2026	April 2027	
Federation Cup	October 2026	April 2027	

=== Overview ===
Competition	Record							
Competition	Pld	W	D	L	GF	GA	GD	Win %
BFL	1	0	0	1	0	6	−6	0.00
Independence Cup	0	0	0	0	0	0	+0	—
Federation Cup	0	0	0	0	0	0	+0	—
Total	1	0	0	1	0	6	−6	0.00

Last updated: 18 September 2026
Source: Competitions

=== Premier League ===
==== League table ====
Pos	Team	Pld	W	D	L	GF	GA	GD	Pts	Qualification or relegation
9	Mohammedan	0	0	0	0	0	0	0	0	
10	Dhaka Wanderers	1	0	0	1	1	2	−1	0	
11	Rahmatganj	1	0	0	1	0	1	−1	0	
12	Brothers Union	1	0	0	1	0	3	−3	0	Relegation for the Bangladesh Championship League
13	Chattogram City	1	0	0	1	0	6	−6	0	Relegation for the Bangladesh Championship League

Updated to match(es) played on 18 September. Source: Soccerway
Rules for classification: 1) Points; 2) Goal difference; 3) Number of goals scored.

==== Results summary ====
Overall								Home						Away					
Pld	W	D	L	GF	GA	GD	Pts	W	D	L	GF	GA	GD	W	D	L	GF	GA	GD
1	0	0	1	0	6	−6	0	0	0	0	0	0	0	0	0	1	0	6	−6

Last updated: 18 September 2026.
Source: Soccerway

==== Results by round ====
Round	1	2	3	4	5	6	7	8	9	10	11	12	13	14	15	16	17	18
Ground	A																	
Result	L																	
Position	13																	

Updated to match(es) played on 18 September 2026. Source: Matches
A = Away; H = Home; W = Win; D = Draw; L = Loss; P = Postponed

==== Matches ====
18 September 2026 1	Fortis FC	6–0	Chattogram City FC	Dhaka
BST 15:00	P. Babou 47', 88'; Noriki Akada 55', 77'; M. Ibrahim 79'; R. Tudu 82'	Report	M. Mithu (yellow card) 45+3'; M. Kahraba (yellow card) 45+4'	Stadium: Bashundhara Kings Arena; Referee: Md Symoon Hasan Sany

2026	v
BST (UTC+6)

2026	v
BST (UTC+6)

2026	v
BST (UTC+6)

2026	v
BST (UTC+6)

2026	v
BST (UTC+6)

=== Group A ===
Pos	Team	Pld	W	D	L	GF	GA	GD	Pts	Qualification
1	Dhaka Abahani	0	0	0	0	0	0	0	0	Qualified for QRF 1
2	Brothers Union	0	0	0	0	0	0	0	0	Advanced to QRF 2
3	Chattogram City	0	0	0	0	0	0	0	0	
4	Fortis FC	0	0	0	0	0	0	0	0	
5	Fakirerpool	0	0	0	0	0	0	0	0	
6	Rahmatganj	0	0	0	0	0	0	0	0	

Source: [ Soccerway]

== Statistics ==
=== Goalscorers ===
As of 18 September 2026

Rank	Player	Position	Total	BPL	Independence	Federation
1	TBC	TBC	0	0	0	0
Total			0	0	0	0
