= 2026–27 Bashundhara Kings season =

Bashundhara Kings 2026–27 football season

Bashundhara Kings
2026–27 season
- Owner: Bashundhara Group
- President: Imrul Hassan
- Head coach: Bayazid Alam Zubair Nipu
- Stadium: Bashundhara Kings Arena
- Bangladesh Football League: TBD
- Federation Cup: TBD
| Home colours | Away colours |

The 2026–27 season is the Bashundhara Kings's 14th competitive professional season since its creation in 2013, and 9th consecutive season in Bangladesh Football League, country's top-tier football league. In addition to the domestic league, Bashundhara Kings participated in this season's edition of AFC Challenge League, Federation Cup and Challenge Cup.

== Players ==
Players and squad numbers last updated on 15 August 2025.
Note: Flags indicate national team as has been defined under FIFA eligibility rules. Players may hold more than one non-FIFA nationality.

| No. | Nat. | Player | Position(s) | Date Of Birth | Year Signed | Previous club |
Goalkeepers
| 1 | (Bangladesh) | Anisur Rahman Zico (Vice-captain) | GK | 10 August 1997 (age 29) | 2018 | Saif Sporting Club |
| 27 | (Bangladesh) | Shahin Molla | GK | | 2024 | |
| 30 | (Bangladesh) | Mehedi Hasan | GK | 2 January 2004 (age 22) | 2020 | Youth team |
| 50 | (Bangladesh) | Mehedi Hasan Srabon | GK | 12 August 2005 (age 21) | 2023 | Muktijoddha SKC |
Defenders
| 2 | (Nigeria) | Emmanuel Tony Agbaji | RB / CB | 21 November 1992 (age 33) | 2025 | Mohammedan SC |
| 4 | (Bangladesh) | Topu Barman (Captain) | CB | 20 December 1994 (age 31) | 2019 | Dhaka Abahani |
| 5 | (Bangladesh) | Tanvir Hossain | CB | 13 December 2003 (age 22) | 2025 | Rahmatganj MFS |
| 12 | (Bangladesh) | Bishwanath Ghosh | RB / CB | 30 May 1999 (age 27) | 2019 | Sheikh Russel KC |
| 15 | (Bangladesh) | Md Taj Uddin | RB | 18 July 2002 (age 24) | 2025 | Rahmatganj MFS |
| 18 | (Bangladesh) | Mohammed Jahid Hossen | LB | 1 June 2002 (age 24) | 2023 | Mohammedan SC |
| 22 | (Bangladesh) | Md Saad Uddin | RB / RM / RW | 1 September 1998 (age 28) | 2022 | Sheikh Russel KC |
| 28 | (Bangladesh) | Yousuf Ali | | | 2024 | |
| 71 | (Bangladesh) | Rimon Hossain | LB / LM | 1 July 2005 (age 21) | 2019 | Arambagh FA |
Midfielders
| 6 | (Bangladesh) | Md Sohel Rana | DM / CM / AM | 1 June 1996 (age 30) | 2023 | Dhaka Abahani |
| 8 | (Bangladesh) | Mohammad Ridoy | AM | 22 April 2000 (age 26) | 2025 | Dhaka Abahani |
| 14 | (Bangladesh) | Chandon Roy | DM / CM | 4 May 2007 (age 19) | 2024 | Sheikh Russel KC |
| 17 | (Bangladesh) | Sohel Rana | CM / DM / AM | 27 March 1995 (age 31) | 2021 | Dhaka Abahani |
| 29 | (Bangladesh) | Mohsin Ahmed | | | 2024 | |
| 37 | (Bangladesh) | Mojibur Rahman Jony | CM / AM | 1 January 2005 (age 21) | 2023 | Fortis FC |
| 44 | (Bangladesh) | Md Sabbir Hossain | CM / DM / LB | 28 June 2003 (age 23) | 2022 | Swadhinata KS |
| 47 | (Bangladesh) | Akmol Hossan Noyon | | | 2024 | |
| | (Bangladesh) | Samuel Raksam | CM / DM | 10 November 2007 (age 18) | 2025 | BFF Elite Academy |
| | (Bangladesh) | Using Marma | | 15 June 2007 (age 19) | 2025 | Youth team |
Forwards
| 7 | (Bangladesh) | Rakib Hossain | RW / SS | 18 November 1998 (age 27) | 2022 | Dhaka Abahani |
| 9 | (Brazil) | Dorielton Gomes | CF | 7 March 1990 (age 36) | 2025 | (India) Odisha FC |
| 10 | (Bangladesh) | Nabib Newaj Jibon | CF / AM | 7 August 1990 (age 36) | 2025 | Rahmatganj MFS |
| 11 | (Bangladesh) | Foysal Ahmed Fahim | RW / CF | 24 February 2002 (age 24) | 2024 | Sheikh Jamal DC |
| 19 | (Bangladesh) | Shahriar Emon | LW / RW | 7 March 2001 (age 25) | 2025 | Dhaka Abahani |
| 37 | (Nigeria) | Emmanuel Sunday | LW / RW | 25 February 1992 (age 34) | 2025 | Mohammedan SC |

== Transfer ==
=== In ===
| Pos | Player | Previous club | Fee | Date | Source |
|---|---|---|---|---|---|
| DF | (Bangladesh) Nur Muhammad Shimul | (Bangladesh) Fakirerpool YMC | Free agent | 16 August 2026 | |
| RB | (Bangladesh) Sushanto Tripura | (Bangladesh) Dhaka Abahani | Free agent | 18 August 2026 | |
| DF | (Bangladesh) Md Ariful Islam Sakhawat | (Bangladesh) Arambagh KS | Free agent | 18 August 2026 | |
| MF | (Bangladesh) Syed Shah Quazem Kirmane | (Bangladesh) Dhaka Abahani | Unattached | 26 August 2026 | |
| MF | (Nepal) Rohit Chand | (Indonesia) Persik Kediri | Free agent | 28 August 2026 | |
| MF | (Nepal) Manish Dangi | (Nepal) Butwal Lumbini | Free agent | 28 August 2026 | |
| FW | (Nigeria) Emeka Ogbugh | (Bangladesh) Dhaka Abahani | Free agent | 28 August 2026 | |
| FW | (Nepal) Anjan Bista | (Nepal) New Road Team | Free agent | 30 August 2026 | |
| MF | (Brazil) Robson Robinho | (India) Mohun Bagan SG | Free agent | 1 September 2026 | |
| FW | (Brazil) Caíque Silva | (United Arab Emirates) Dibba Al-Hisn | Free agent | 3 September 2026 | |

=== Out ===
| No. | Pos | Player | Moved to | Fee | Date | Source |
|---|---|---|---|---|---|---|
| 47 | MF | (Bangladesh) Akmol Hossain Noyon | Bangladesh Police | Free Transfer | 6 July 2026 | |
| 52 | FW | (Bangladesh) Md Insan Hossain | (Bangladesh) Bashundhara Kings | Free Transfer | 4 July 2026 | |
| 9 | FW | (Brazil) Dorielton | (Maldives) New Radiant | Free Transfer | 23 July 2026 | |
| 30 | GK | (Bangladesh) Md Mehedi Hasan | (Bangladesh) Rahmatganj MFS | Free agent | 25 July 2026 | |
| 11 | FW | (Bangladesh) Foysal Ahmed Fahim | (Bangladesh) Mohammedan SC | Free agent | 29 July 2026 | |
| 22 | MF | (Bangladesh) Saad Uddin | (Bangladesh) Mohammedan SC | Free agent | 29 July 2026 | |
| 6 | DF | (Bangladesh) Shohel Rana | (Bangladesh) Mohammedan SC | Free agent | 29 July 2026 | |
| 19 | FW | (Bangladesh) Shahriar Emon | (Bangladesh) Mohammedan SC | Free agent | 29 July 2026 | |
| 71 | DF | (Bangladesh) Rimon Hossain | (Bangladesh) Mohammedan SC | Free agent | 30 July 2026 | |
| 37 | MF | (Bangladesh) Mojibur Rahman Jony | (Bangladesh) Mohammedan SC | Free agent | 31 July 2026 | |

== Overall ==
Win Draw Loss Fixtures

| Competition | First match | Last match | Final Position |
|---|---|---|---|
| BFL | 22 September 2026 | April 2027 | |
| Federation Cup | October 2026 | April 2027 | |

=== Overview ===
| Competition | Record | | | | | | | |
| Competition | Pld | W | D | L | GF | GA | GD | Win % |
|---|---|---|---|---|---|---|---|---|
| BFL | 0 | 0 | 0 | 0 | 0 | 0 | +0 | — |
| Federation Cup | 0 | 0 | 0 | 0 | 0 | 0 | +0 | — |
| Total | 0 | 0 | 0 | 0 | 0 | 0 | +0 | — |

Last updated: September 2026
Source: Competitions

=== Premier League ===
==== League table ====
| Pos | Team | Pld | W | D | L | GF | GA | GD | Pts | Qualification or relegation |
|---|---|---|---|---|---|---|---|---|---|---|
| 1 | Bangladesh Police | 5 | 4 | 1 | 0 | 14 | 1 | +13 | 13 | Qualification for the AFC; Challenge League qualifying stage |
| 2 | Mohammedan | 4 | 4 | 0 | 0 | 13 | 0 | +13 | 12 | |
| 3 | Bashundhara Kings | 4 | 3 | 1 | 0 | 15 | 3 | +12 | 10 | |
| 4 | City Club | 5 | 3 | 1 | 1 | 12 | 7 | +5 | 10 | |
| 5 | Fortis | 3 | 2 | 1 | 0 | 15 | 3 | +12 | 7 | |

Updated to match(es) played on 24 October 2026. Source: Soccerway
Rules for classification: 1) Points; 2) Goal difference; 3) Number of goals scored.

==== Results summary ====
| Overall | | | | | | | | Home | | | | | | Away | | | | | |
| Pld | W | D | L | GF | GA | GD | Pts | W | D | L | GF | GA | GD | W | D | L | GF | GA | GD |
|---|---|---|---|---|---|---|---|---|---|---|---|---|---|---|---|---|---|---|---|
| 0 | 0 | 0 | 0 | 0 | 0 | 0 | 0 | 0 | 0 | 0 | 0 | 0 | 0 | 0 | 0 | 0 | 0 | 0 | 0 |

Source: Soccerway

==== Results by round ====
| Round | 1 | 2 | 3 | 4 | 5 | 6 | 7 | 8 | 9 | 10 | 11 | 12 | 13 | 14 | 15 | 16 | 17 | 18 |
|---|---|---|---|---|---|---|---|---|---|---|---|---|---|---|---|---|---|---|
| Ground | A | | | | | | | | | | | | | | | | | |
| Result | | | | | | | | | | | | | | | | | | |
| Position | | | | | | | | | | | | | | | | | | |

Source: Matches
A = Away; H = Home; W = Win; D = Draw; L = Loss; P = Postponed

==== Matches ====
| 19 September 2026 1 | Arambagh KS | v | Bashundhara Kings | Gopalganj |
| 15:00 BST (UTC+6) | | | | Stadium: Sheikh Fazlul Haque Mani Stadium |

| 2026 | v |
| BST (UTC+6) |

| 2026 | v |
| BST (UTC+6) |

| 2026 | v |
| BST (UTC+6) |

| 2026 | v |
| BST (UTC+6) |

=== Group B ===
| Pos | Team | Pld | W | D | L | GF | GA | GD | Pts | Qualification |
|---|---|---|---|---|---|---|---|---|---|---|
| 1 | Bashundhara Kings | 2 | 2 | 0 | 0 | 7 | 0 | +7 | 6 | Qualified for QRF 1 |
| 2 | Mohammedan SC | 2 | 1 | 1 | 0 | 4 | 2 | +2 | 4 | Advanced to QRF 2 |
| 3 | Bangladesh Police | 1 | 0 | 1 | 0 | 1 | 1 | 0 | 1 | |
| 4 | PWD SC | 1 | 0 | 1 | 0 | 1 | 1 | 0 | 1 | |
| 5 | Arambagh KS | 2 | 0 | 1 | 1 | 3 | 5 | −2 | 1 | |
| 6 | City Club | 2 | 0 | 1 | 1 | 1 | 3 | −2 | 1 | |
| 7 | Dhaka Wanderers | 2 | 0 | 1 | 1 | 2 | 7 | −5 | 1 | |

Updated to match(es) played on 20 October 2026. Source: Soccerway

== Statistics ==
=== Goalscorers ===
As of 2026

| Rank | Player | Position | Total | BPL | Independence | Federation |
|---|---|---|---|---|---|---|
| 1 | TBC | TBC | 0 | 0 | 0 | 0 |
| Total | | | 0 | 0 | 0 | 0 |
