= 2026–27 Brothers Union season =

Brothers Union
2026–27 season
- Convener: Ishraque Hossain
- Head coach: Omar Sisse
- Stadium: Bir Sreshtho Matiur Rahman Stadium
- Bangladesh Football League: TBD
- Federation Cup: TBD
- Independence Cup: TBD
Home colours	Away colours

The 2026–27 season is the Brothers Union's 17th season in the Bangladesh Football League and its 4th since suffering relegation in 2020–21. It is also their 44th overall season in the top flight of Bangladeshi football, since debuting in 1975. In addition to domestic league, the club also participate in the Federation Cup. The season covered the period from 1 June 2026 to June 2027.

== Current squad ==
As of 18 April 2026

Note: Flags indicate national team as defined under FIFA eligibility rules; some limited exceptions apply. Players may hold more than one non-FIFA nationality.

No.	Pos.	Nation	Player
1	GK	BAN	Russel Mahmud Liton
3	DF	BAN	Mojammel Hossain Nira
4	DF	SEN	Mouhamed Becaye Diarra
6	MF	BAN	Jamal Bhuyan (captain)
7	MF	BAN	Abu Shaeid
9	FW	BAN	Aminur Rahman Sajib
13	MF	BAN	Kawshik Barua
15	FW	BAN	Md Meraj Pradhan
16	FW	BAN	Mannaf Rabby
21	FW	BAN	Md Arifur Rahman Raju
22	GK	BAN	Md Ishaque Akando
23	DF	BAN	Salahuddin Shahed
24	FW	BAN	Gaushul Akbor Sabin
25	GK	BAN	Shanto Kumar Ray
26	DF	BAN	Monir Alam
27	FW	BAN	Md Yeasin Arafat Sifat
28	MF	BAN	Sanjay Karim
29	FW	BAN	Md Insan Hossain (on loan from Bashundhara Kings)

No.	Pos.	Nation	Player
30	MF	BAN	Mohsin Ahmed (on loan from Bashundhara Kings)
32	MF	PAK	Hayyaan Khattak
33	DF	BAN	Nabil Khandakar
35	GK	BAN	Md Emon
38	DF	PAK	Muhammad Umar Hayat
39	DF	PAK	Abdullah Shah
40	MF	PAK	Alamgir Ghazi
60	DF	BAN	Sirajul Islam Rana
66	FW	BAN	Moltazim Alam Himel
77	DF	BAN	Yeasin Arafat
80	DF	GUI	Ibrahima Barry
88	FW	PAK	Shayak Dost
90	FW	GUI	Mamoudou Conde
95	FW	BAN	Md Manzurul Karim
98	FW	NGR	Samuel Chigozie Ononiwu
99	FW	GUI	Kerfala Kouyaté

== Transfer ==
=== In ===
Pos	Player	Previous club	Fee	Date	Source
ST	(Pakistan) Syed Ali Raza	(Pakistan) WAPDA FC	Free agent	17 August 2026	
CM	(Nepal) Sabin Kumar Lungeli	(Nepal) Sankata FC	Free agent	17 August 2026	
GK	(Bangladesh) Hasnat Abdullah	(Bangladesh) Dhaka Rangers FC	Free agent	25 August 2026	
MF	(Pakistan) Ali Uzair	(Bangladesh) PWD Sports Club	Free agent	24 August 2026	
DF	(Brazil) Jonathan Ferreira Santana	(Bangladesh) PWD Sports Club	Free agent	4 September 2026	
ST	(Bangladesh) Md Halim	(Bangladesh) Chattogram City FC	Free agent	5 September 2026	
CM	(Bangladesh) Ariful Haque Shemanto	(Bangladesh) City Club	Free agent	5 September 2026	
CM	(Bangladesh) Md Sadik Ahmed	(Bangladesh) Brothers Union	Free agent	5 September 2026	

=== Out ===
Pos	Player	Moved to	Fee	Date	Source
DF	(Bangladesh) Sirajul Islam Rana	(Bangladesh) PWD Sports Club	Free agent	25 July 2026	
FW	(Pakistan) Shayak Dost	(Bangladesh) City Club	Free agent	1 August 2026	
ST	(Bangladesh) Meraj Prodhan	(Bangladesh) Arambagh KS	Unattached	20 August 2026	

== Overall ==
Win Draw Loss Fixtures

Competition	First match	Last match	Final Position
BFL	September 2026	April 2027	
Federation Cup	October 2026	April 2027	
Independence Cup	October 2026	April 2027	

=== Overview ===
Competition	Record							
Competition	Pld	W	D	L	GF	GA	GD	Win %
BFL	0	0	0	0	0	0	+0	—
Independence Cup	0	0	0	0	0	0	+0	—
Federation Cup	0	0	0	0	0	0	+0	—
Total	0	0	0	0	0	0	+0	—

Last updated: September 2026
Source: Competitions

=== Premier League ===
==== League table ====
Pos	Team	Pld	W	D	L	GF	GA	GD	Pts
6	Dhaka Abahani	4	2	1	1	9	4	+5	7
7	Rahmatganj	5	1	3	1	8	8	0	6
8	Brothers Union	5	1	2	2	5	13	−8	5
9	PWD SC	5	0	3	2	2	5	−3	3
10	Fakirerpool	4	1	0	3	4	13	−9	3

Updated to match(es) played on 24 October 2026. Source: Soccerway
Rules for classification: 1) Points; 2) Goal difference; 3) Number of goals scored.

==== Results summary ====
Overall								Home						Away					
Pld	W	D	L	GF	GA	GD	Pts	W	D	L	GF	GA	GD	W	D	L	GF	GA	GD
0	0	0	0	0	0	0	0	0	0	0	0	0	0	0	0	0	0	0	0

Source: Soccerway

==== Results by round ====
Round	1	2	3	4	5	6	7	8	9	10	11	12	13	14	15	16	17	18
Ground																		
Result																		
Position																		

Source: Matches
A = Away; H = Home; W = Win; D = Draw; L = Loss; P = Postponed

==== Matches ====
2026	v
BST (UTC+6)

2026	v
BST (UTC+6)

2026	v
BST (UTC+6)

2026	v
BST (UTC+6)

2026	v
BST (UTC+6)

=== Group A ===
Pos	Team	Pld	W	D	L	GF	GA	GD	Pts	Qualification
1	Brothers Union	2	1	1	0	4	1	+3	4	Qualified for QRF 1
2	Chattogram City	2	1	1	0	4	2	+2	4	Advanced to QRF 2
3	Dhaka Abahani	1	0	1	0	1	1	0	1	
4	Fortis FC	1	0	1	0	1	1	0	1	
5	Rahmatganj	2	0	1	1	1	3	−2	1	
6	Fakirerpool	2	0	1	1	2	5	−3	1	

Updated to match(es) played on 13 October 2026. Source: Soccerway

== Statistics ==
=== Goalscorers ===
As of 2026

Rank	Player	Position	Total	BPL	Independence	Federation
1	TBC	TBC	0	0	0	0
Total			0	0	0	0
