= 2026–27 Fakirerpool Young Men's Club season =

Fakirerpool Young Men's Club 2026–27 football season

Fakirerpool YMC
2026–27 season
- President: Anwar Hossain Makhon
- Head coach: Albert Lyapin
- Stadium: Shaheed Miraj–Tapan Stadium
- Football League: TBD
- Federation Cup: TBD

The 2026–27 season is Fakirerpool Young Men's Club's 66th season in existence and 3rd season in the Bangladesh Football League.In addition to the domestic league, Fakirerpool participating in this season's Federation Cup. The season covers the period from 1 June 2026 to May 2027.

== Current squad ==
As of 20 May 2025

Note: Flags indicate national team as defined under FIFA eligibility rules; some limited exceptions apply. Players may hold more than one non-FIFA nationality.

| No. | Pos. | Nation | Player |
|---|---|---|---|
| 1 | GK | BAN | Tayeb Siddique |
| 2 | DF | BAN | Md Mosharaf Hossain Shanto |
| 3 | DF | BAN | Jintu Mia |
| 5 | DF | BAN | Raficul Islam (Captain) |
| 11 | FW | BAN | Mehedi Hasan Hridoy |
| 12 | FW | BAN | Md Bappi Hasan |
| 13 | DF | BAN | Md Sabbir Hossain |
| 14 | MF | BAN | Shiblal Tudo |
| 15 | MF | BAN | Md Sumon Islam |
| 16 | DF | BAN | Yeasin Mia Rajib |
| 17 | DF | BAN | Amit Hasan |
| 18 | FW | BAN | Md Sayed Hossen Sayem |
| 19 | FW | BAN | Anik Hossain Siam |
| 20 | MF | BAN | Shanto Tudo |
| 21 | MF | BAN | Mehedi Hasan Polash |

| No. | Pos. | Nation | Player |
|---|---|---|---|
| 22 | DF | BAN | Md Rakib Rahman |
| 23 | MF | BAN | Md Arifur Rahman Shemanto |
| 24 | FW | BAN | Md Ifran Hossain |
| 25 | GK | BAN | Md Shaju Ahmed |
| 26 | DF | BAN | Md Sagor Hossain |
| 27 | MF | BAN | Md Shiab Mia |
| 33 | DF | BAN | Tias Das |
| 39 | DF | BAN | Tamim Ahammed |
| 49 | FW | BAN | Mohammad Jahedul Alam |
| 55 | DF | BAN | Md Rasel Hossain |
| 59 | DF | MLI | Abu Mohamed Fofona |
| 66 | MF | BAN | Md Jahid Hossain |
| 69 | FW | CIV | Ouattara Ben Ibrahim |
| 77 | FW | BAN | Rafayel Tudu |
| 88 | FW | BAN | Dalim Barman |

== Transfer ==
=== In ===
| Pos | Player | Previous club | Fee | Date | Source |
|---|---|---|---|---|---|
| MF | (Bangladesh) Al Amin | (Bangladesh) Suktara Jubo Sangsad | Free agent | 1 September 2026 | |
| GK | (Bangladesh) Antor Ali | (Bangladesh) Brothers Union | Free agent | 1 September 2026 | |
| DF | (Bangladesh) Md Jintu | (Bangladesh) Dhaka Wanderers Club | Free agent | 1 September 2026 | |
| ST | (The Gambia) Suleiman Sillah | (Bangladesh) Dhaka Wanderers Club | Free agent | 2 September 2026 | |

=== Out ===
| Pos | Player | To | Fee | Date | Source |

=== Retained ===
| Pos | Player | Date | Source |
|---|---|---|---|
| GK | (Bangladesh) Md Shaju Ahmed | 1 September 2026 | |

== Overall ==
Win Draw Loss Fixtures

| Competition | First match | Last match | Final Position |
|---|---|---|---|
| BFL | September 2026 | April 2027 | |
| Federation Cup | October 2026 | April 2027 | |

=== Overview ===
| Competition | Record | | | | | | | |
| Competition | Pld | W | D | L | GF | GA | GD | Win % |
|---|---|---|---|---|---|---|---|---|
| BFL | 0 | 0 | 0 | 0 | 0 | 0 | +0 | — |
| Federation Cup | 0 | 0 | 0 | 0 | 0 | 0 | +0 | — |
| Total | 0 | 0 | 0 | 0 | 0 | 0 | +0 | — |

Last updated: September 2026
Source: Competitions

=== Premier League ===
==== League table ====
| Pos | Team | Pld | W | D | L | GF | GA | GD | Pts | Qualification or relegation |
|---|---|---|---|---|---|---|---|---|---|---|
| 8 | Brothers Union | 5 | 1 | 2 | 2 | 5 | 13 | −8 | 5 | |
| 9 | PWD SC | 5 | 0 | 3 | 2 | 2 | 5 | −3 | 3 | |
| 10 | Fakirerpool | 4 | 1 | 0 | 3 | 4 | 13 | −9 | 3 | |
| 11 | Arambagh | 5 | 0 | 3 | 2 | 4 | 14 | −10 | 3 | |
| 12 | Chattogram City | 5 | 0 | 0 | 5 | 4 | 18 | −14 | 0 | Relegation for the Bangladesh Championship League |

Updated to match(es) played on 24 October 2026. Source: Soccerway
Rules for classification: 1) Points; 2) Goal difference; 3) Number of goals scored.

==== Results summary ====
| Overall | | | | | | | | Home | | | | | | Away | | | | | |
| Pld | W | D | L | GF | GA | GD | Pts | W | D | L | GF | GA | GD | W | D | L | GF | GA | GD |
|---|---|---|---|---|---|---|---|---|---|---|---|---|---|---|---|---|---|---|---|
| 0 | 0 | 0 | 0 | 0 | 0 | 0 | 0 | 0 | 0 | 0 | 0 | 0 | 0 | 0 | 0 | 0 | 0 | 0 | 0 |

Source: Soccerway

==== Results by round ====
| Round | 1 | 2 | 3 | 4 | 5 | 6 | 7 | 8 | 9 | 10 | 11 | 12 | 13 | 14 | 15 | 16 | 17 | 18 |
|---|---|---|---|---|---|---|---|---|---|---|---|---|---|---|---|---|---|---|
| Ground | | | | | | | | | | | | | | | | | | |
| Result | | | | | | | | | | | | | | | | | | |
| Position | | | | | | | | | | | | | | | | | | |

Source: Matches
A = Away; H = Home; W = Win; D = Draw; L = Loss; P = Postponed

==== Matches ====
| 2026 | v |
| BST (UTC+6) |

| 2026 | v |
| BST (UTC+6) |

| 2026 | v |
| BST (UTC+6) |

| 2026 | v |
| BST (UTC+6) |

| 2026 | v |
| BST (UTC+6) |

=== Group A ===
| Pos | Team | Pld | W | D | L | GF | GA | GD | Pts | Qualification |
|---|---|---|---|---|---|---|---|---|---|---|
| 1 | Brothers Union | 2 | 1 | 1 | 0 | 4 | 1 | +3 | 4 | Qualified for QRF 1 |
| 2 | Chattogram City | 2 | 1 | 1 | 0 | 4 | 2 | +2 | 4 | Advanced to QRF 2 |
| 3 | Dhaka Abahani | 1 | 0 | 1 | 0 | 1 | 1 | 0 | 1 | |
| 4 | Fortis FC | 1 | 0 | 1 | 0 | 1 | 1 | 0 | 1 | |
| 5 | Rahmatganj | 2 | 0 | 1 | 1 | 1 | 3 | −2 | 1 | |
| 6 | Fakirerpool | 2 | 0 | 1 | 1 | 2 | 5 | −3 | 1 | |

Updated to match(es) played on 13 October 2026. Source: Soccerway

== Statistics ==
=== Goalscorers ===
As of September 2026

| Rank | Player | Position | Total | BFL | Federation |
|---|---|---|---|---|---|
| 1 | TBC | TBC | 0 | 0 | 0 |
| Total | | | 0 | 0 | 0 |
