= 2026–27 Rahmatganj MFS season =

Rahmatganj MFS 2026–27 football season

Rahmatganj MFS
2026–27 season
- Chairman: Haji Mohammad Salim
- Head coach: Sheikh Zahidur Rahman Milon
- Bangladesh Football League: TBD
- Federation Cup: TBD
- Independence Cup: TBD

The 2026–27 season is the Rahmatganj MFS's 94th season since its establishment in 1933 and its 17th season in the Bangladesh Football League. In addition to domestic league, Rahmatganj MFS will participate in this season's edition of Federation Cup and Independence Cup. The season covering period is 1 June 2026 to May 2027.

== Current squad ==
Rahmatganj MFS squad for 2025–26 season.

As of 13 March 2026

Note: Flags indicate national team as defined under FIFA eligibility rules; some limited exceptions apply. Players may hold more than one non-FIFA nationality.

No.	Pos.	Nation	Player
1	GK	BAN	Mohammed Mamun Alif
2	DF	BAN	Parvej Ahmed
3	DF	NEP	Abhishek Limbu
4	DF	BAN	Shahin Ahammad
5	FW	BAN	Rafiqul Islam
6	MF	BAN	Arafat Hossain
7	MF	BAN	Md Sayde (Captain)
8	FW	BAN	Mohamed Munna
10	MF	GAM	Solomon King Kanform
11	FW	BAN	Rafiqul Islam
12	FW	BAN	Md Jubayer Ahmed
13	MF	BAN	Md Arabi
14	MF	GHA	Clement Adu
15	DF	GHA	Andrews Kwadwo Appau
16	MF	BAN	Jayed Ahmed
17	FW	BAN	Mehedi Hasan Royal

No.	Pos.	Nation	Player
18	FW	GAM	Adama Jammeh
19	DF	BAN	Rajon Howladar
20	FW	BAN	Samin Yasir Juel
21	DF	BAN	Ariful Islam Jitu
22	GK	BAN	Shimul Kumar Das
23	MF	BAN	Md Faizullah
24	DF	BAN	Md Alfaj Mia
25	GK	BAN	Md Nahidul Islam
26	DF	BAN	Istekharul Alam Shakil
27	MF	BAN	Md Sadik Ahmed
28	FW	BAN	Mohammed Fahim Nur Toha
29	MF	BAN	Iqbal Hossain
33	DF	BAN	Md Shifat Sahariar
36	GK	BAN	Ahsan Habib Bipu
99	FW	BAN	Nihat Jaman Ucchash

== Transfer ==
=== In ===
Pos	Player	Previous club	Fee	Date	Source
DF	(Bangladesh) Md Imran Khan	(Bangladesh) PWD Sports Club	Free Transfer	23 July 2026	
FW	(Bangladesh) Md Rifat Kazi	(Bangladesh) Khelaghar Samaj Kallyan Samity	Free Transfer	24 July 2026	
GK	(Bangladesh) Md Mehedi Hasan	(Bangladesh) Bashundhara Kings	Free agent	25 July 2026	
MF	(Bangladesh) Nijamuddin Raju	(Bangladesh) Mohammedan SC	Free agent	26 July 2026	
MF	(Nepal) Kushal Deuba	Nepal Army F.C.	Free agent	16 August 2026	
FW	(Senegal) Ibrahim Sene	(Lebanon) Al Ahed FC	Free agent	2 September 2026	
FW	(Ghana) Prince Owusua Ansah	(Ghana) Dreams F.C.	Free agent	3 September 2026	

=== Out ===
Pos	Player	Moved to	Fee	Date	Source
MF	(The Gambia) Solomon King Kanform	(Bangladesh) City Club	Free Transfer	18 July 2026	
ST	(Bangladesh) Md Jubayer Ahmed	(Bangladesh) PWD Sports Club	Unattached	18 August 2026	
CM	(Bangladesh) Md Sadik Ahmed	(Bangladesh) Brothers Union	Free agent	5 September 2026	

== Overall ==
Win Draw Loss Fixtures

Competition	First match	Last match	Final Position
BFL	September 2026	April 2027	
Federation Cup	October 2026	April 2027	

=== Overview ===
Competition	Record							
Competition	Pld	W	D	L	GF	GA	GD	Win %
BFL	0	0	0	0	0	0	+0	—
Federation Cup	0	0	0	0	0	0	+0	—
Total	0	0	0	0	0	0	+0	—

Last updated: September 2026
Source: Competitions

=== Premier League ===
==== League table ====
Pos	Team	Pld	W	D	L	GF	GA	GD	Pts
5	Fortis	3	2	1	0	15	3	+12	7
6	Dhaka Abahani	4	2	1	1	9	4	+5	7
7	Rahmatganj	5	1	3	1	8	8	0	6
8	Brothers Union	5	1	2	2	5	13	−8	5
9	PWD SC	5	0	3	2	2	5	−3	3

Updated to match(es) played on 24 October 2026. Source: Soccerway
Rules for classification: 1) Points; 2) Goal difference; 3) Number of goals scored.

==== Results summary ====
Overall								Home						Away					
Pld	W	D	L	GF	GA	GD	Pts	W	D	L	GF	GA	GD	W	D	L	GF	GA	GD
0	0	0	0	0	0	0	0	0	0	0	0	0	0	0	0	0	0	0	0

Source: Soccerway

==== Results by round ====
Round	1	2	3	4	5	6	7	8	9	10	11	12	13	14	15	16	17	18
Ground																		
Result																		
Position																		

Source: Matches
A = Away; H = Home; W = Win; D = Draw; L = Loss; P = Postponed

==== Matches ====
2026	v
BST (UTC+6)

2026	v
BST (UTC+6)

2026	v
BST (UTC+6)

2026	v
BST (UTC+6)

2026	v
BST (UTC+6)

=== Group A ===
Pos	Team	Pld	W	D	L	GF	GA	GD	Pts	Qualification
1	Brothers Union	2	1	1	0	4	1	+3	4	Qualified for QRF 1
2	Chattogram City	2	1	1	0	4	2	+2	4	Advanced to QRF 2
3	Dhaka Abahani	1	0	1	0	1	1	0	1	
4	Fortis FC	1	0	1	0	1	1	0	1	
5	Rahmatganj	2	0	1	1	1	3	−2	1	
6	Fakirerpool	2	0	1	1	2	5	−3	1	

Updated to match(es) played on 13 October 2026. Source: Soccerway

== Statistics ==
=== Goalscorers ===
As of 2026

Rank	Player	Position	Total	BPL	Independence	Federation
1	TBC	TBC	0	0	0	0
Total			0	0	0	0
