= 2026–27 Arambagh KS season =

Arambagh KS 2026–27 football season

Arambagh KS
2026–27 season
- General Secretary: Md Yaqub Ali
- Head coach: Md Akbar Hossain Ridon
- Bangladesh Football League: TBD
- Federation Cup: TBD

The 2026–27 season is Arambagh KS's 68th season since its establishment in 1958 and its second in the Bangladesh Football League, the top tier of football in Bangladesh. Arambagh returned to the top flight in 2025. They finished ninth in the 2025–26 season and were relegated, but on 2 August 2026 the Bangladesh Football Federation cancelled relegation from that season and the club stayed in the league. With the league expanded from ten clubs to 13, Arambagh's vice-president Ezaz Ahmed Jahangir said that about half of the players were new signings and that the club still recruited from the lower divisions. Besides the league, the club also plays in the 2026–27 Federation Cup.

Arambagh drew 1–1 with the defending champions, Bashundhara Kings, in their first league match on 19 September 2026 at Gopalganj District Stadium, after substitute Samin Yassar Juel headed an equaliser in stoppage time. In the Federation Cup, the Ghanaian Suraj Rayies put Arambagh ahead in the first half against Mohammedan on 6 October, but Mohammedan came back to win 3–1. Four days later Mohammedan beat them 6–0 in the league. Shortly before the league's month-long break in late October, City Club beat a ten-man Arambagh side 4–0.

== Current squad ==
As of 5 September 2025

Note: Flags indicate national team as defined under FIFA eligibility rules; some limited exceptions apply. Players may hold more than one non-FIFA nationality.

No.	Pos.	Nation	Player
1	GK	BAN	Azad Hossen
2	DF	BAN	Kazi Rahad Mia
3	DF	BAN	Md Rokey
4	DF	BAN	Nikson Chakma (Captain)
5	DF	BAN	Mohammed Obaidullah
—			
7	FW	NGR	Yaya John Denapo
8	MF	GHA	Shadrach Lantei-Mills
9	FW	BAN	Amir Hakim Bappy
10	FW	LBN	Mohammad Haider Awada
11	FW	GHA	Kwame Kizito
12	FW	BAN	Md Nazim Uddin
13	DF	BAN	Shakil Ahmed
14	MF	BAN	Samor Joy Tanchangya
15	MF	BAN	Akkas Ali
16	FW	BAN	Md Umor Faruq Mithu
17	FW	BAN	Arifur Rahman
18	MF	BAN	Md Ratul Hasan
19	MF	BAN	Khandoker Ashraful Islam

No.	Pos.	Nation	Player
20	MF	BAN	Md Shahidul Islam Sumon
21	DF	BAN	Sadekujaman Fahim
22	GK	BAN	Md Mohiuddin Ranu
23	DF	BAN	Apurbo Mali
24	DF	BAN	Md Ariful Islam Sakhawat
25	DF	IND	Prosenjit Chakraborty
26	MF	BAN	Md Shawon
27	FW	BAN	Md Shakil Ali
31	GK	BAN	Md Salim
32	FW	BAN	Md Nazmul Ahmed Shakil
33	GK	BAN	Md Tanvir Ahamed
39	MF	BAN	Abdullah Junaid Chisty
40	FW	BAN	Azmol Gazi
44	FW	BAN	Shawon Ritchil
69	MF	BAN	Md Mahmudul Hasan
70	MF	BAN	Didarul Alam
71	DF	BAN	Mir Asfaruddin Ahmed

== Transfer ==
=== In ===
Pos	Player	Previous club	Fee	Date	Source
LB	(Bangladesh) Mosiur Islam Mishu	(Bangladesh) BRTC Sports Club	Unattached	18 August 2026	
ST	(Bangladesh) Meraj Prodhan	(Bangladesh) Brothers Union	Free agent	20 August 2026	

=== Out ===
Pos	Player	To	Fee	Date	Source
DF	(Bangladesh) Md Ariful Islam Sakhawat	(Bangladesh) Bashundhara Kings	Free agent	17 August 2026	

== Overall ==
Win Draw Loss Fixtures

Competition	First match	Last match	Final Position
BFL	September 2026	April 2027	
Federation Cup	October 2026	April 2027	

=== Overview ===
Competition	Record							
Competition	Pld	W	D	L	GF	GA	GD	Win %
BFL	0	0	0	0	0	0	+0	—
Federation Cup	0	0	0	0	0	0	+0	—
Total	0	0	0	0	0	0	+0	—

Last updated: September 2026
Source: Competitions

=== Bangladesh Football League ===
==== League table ====
Pos	Team	Pld	W	D	L	GF	GA	GD	Pts	Qualification or relegation
9	PWD SC	5	0	3	2	2	5	−3	3	
10	Fakirerpool	4	1	0	3	4	13	−9	3	
11	Arambagh	5	0	3	2	4	14	−10	3	
12	Chattogram City	5	0	0	5	4	18	−14	0	Relegation for the Bangladesh Championship League
13	Dhaka Wanderers	4	0	0	4	2	18	−16	0	Relegation for the Bangladesh Championship League

Updated to match(es) played on 24 October 2026. Source: Soccerway
Rules for classification: 1) Points; 2) Goal difference; 3) Number of goals scored.

==== Results summary ====
Overall								Home						Away					
Pld	W	D	L	GF	GA	GD	Pts	W	D	L	GF	GA	GD	W	D	L	GF	GA	GD
0	0	0	0	0	0	0	0	0	0	0	0	0	0	0	0	0	0	0	0

Source: Soccerway

==== Results by round ====
Round	1	2	3	4	5	6	7	8	9	10	11	12	13	14	15	16	17	18
Ground																		
Result																		
Position																		

Source: Matches
A = Away; H = Home; W = Win; D = Draw; L = Loss; P = Postponed

==== Matches ====
2026	v
BST (UTC+6)

2026	v
BST (UTC+6)

2026	v
BST (UTC+6)

2026	v
BST (UTC+6)

2026	v
BST (UTC+6)

=== Group B ===
Pos	Team	Pld	W	D	L	GF	GA	GD	Pts	Qualification
1	Bashundhara Kings	2	2	0	0	7	0	+7	6	Qualified for QRF 1
2	Mohammedan SC	2	1	1	0	4	2	+2	4	Advanced to QRF 2
3	Bangladesh Police	1	0	1	0	1	1	0	1	
4	PWD SC	1	0	1	0	1	1	0	1	
5	Arambagh KS	2	0	1	1	3	5	−2	1	
6	City Club	2	0	1	1	1	3	−2	1	
7	Dhaka Wanderers	2	0	1	1	2	7	−5	1	

Updated to match(es) played on 20 October 2026. Source: Soccerway

== Statistics ==
=== Goalscorers ===
As of August 2026

Rank	Player	Position	Total	BFL	Federation
1	TBC	TBC	0	0	0
Total			0	0	0
