= Minhazul Karim Shadin =

Bangladeshi professional footballer

Minhazul Shadin
Personal information
- Full name: Minhazul Karim Shadin
- Date of birth: 10 March 2002 (age 24)
- Place of birth: Jashore, Bangladesh
- Height: 1.72 m (5 ft 8 in)
- Position: Right winger

Team information
- Current team: Chattogram City
- Number: 12

Youth career
- 2016–2022: Shams-Ul-Huda Football Academy
- 2014–2015: BFF Elite Academy

Senior career*
| Years | Team | Apps | (Gls) |
| 2019 | Dilkusha | | |
| 2020 | Friends SWO | | |
| 2021–2022 | Dhaka Wanderers | 21 | (3) |
| 2023–2024 | Defensores de Cambaceres | 0 | (0) |
| 2024–2026 | PWD | 36 | (10) |
| 2026– | Chattogram City | 0 | (0) |

International career^{‡}
| 2017 | Bangladesh U16 | | |
| 2026– | Bangladesh | 2 | (0) |
- * Club domestic league appearances and goals as of 30 October 2026 ‡ National team caps and goals as of 1 October 2026

Minhazul Karim Shadin (Bengali: মিনহাজ়ুল করিম স্বাধীন, pronounced [minhaːzul koɾim ʃaːdin], born 10 March 2002) is a Bangladeshi professional footballer who plays as a right-winger for Bangladesh Football League club Chattogram City and the Bangladesh national team.

== Early life ==
Shadin was born in Kasba Palbari, in Jessore, Bangladesh. His father, Sergeant Fazlul Karim, played football for the Bangladesh Army football team for 17 years. Shadin initially became interested in football after failing to gain admission to Jhenaidah Cadet College in 2014 because he was underweight. He later participated in inter-school football tournaments, where he was spotted by coach Kazi Maruf.

He was also part of the short-lived BFF Elite Football Academy under-14 programme in Sylhet. He joined Jessore's Shams-Ul-Huda Football Academy in 2016 and remained there until 2022. In 2018, Shadin scored two goals and provided four assists for Dhaka Abahani during their BFF U-18 Football Tournament triumph.

== Club career ==
=== Early career ===
In 2019, Shadin played Second Division football in Dhaka for Dilkusha SC. In 2020, he played Senior Division football for Friends Social Welfare Organization.

=== Dhaka Wanderers ===
In 2021, he joined Dhaka Wanderers in the Bangladesh Championship League, the country's second-tier. In his first season, playing professional football, he scored 3 goals in 21 appearance.

=== Defensores de Cambaceres ===
In 2024, Shadin travelled to Argentina, where he underwent a trial with Defensores de Cambaceres and trained with the club's first team. After several training sessions, he was approved by head coach Juan Arias Navarro and presented as a new member of the club's squad. He spent three months in Argentina, where he scored three goals in five tournament matches.

=== PWD ===
Shadin joined PWD SC ahead of the 2024–25 BCL season. He was named the competition's Most Valuable Player and joint-top scorer, helping PWD secure promotion to the Bangladesh Football League. He scored eight goals and provided 22 assists in 18 league appearances.

Following PWD's promotion, Shadin made 18 appearances and scored 2 goals in the 2025–26 BFL. He scored his first top-tier goal in PWD's 2–2 draw against Dhaka Abahani on 19 December 2025. Across his two seasons with PWD, he recorded 36 league appearances and 10 goals.

=== Chattogram City ===
In 2026, Shadin joined newly-promoted BFL club Chattogram City.

== International career ==
Shadin represented the Bangladesh U14 team at the 2016 Super Mokh Cup. The following year, He was also selected for the Bangladesh U16 long-term residential camp in 2017, where he was listed as a right midfielder by the BFF. In the same year, he played for the U15 team at the 2017 SAFF U-15 Championship and also participated in the 2018 AFC U-16 Championship qualification with Bangladesh U17 where he made 2 appearances.

Shadin made his senior international debut against Singapore in the 2026 FIFA ASEAN Cup on 28 September 2026.

== Playing style ==
Shadin primarily plays as a winger, particularly on the right side. He is known for his crossing and set-piece delivery and has contributed a significant number of assists during his career. He has said that his position naturally leads him to focus on creating chances for his teammates.

== Career statistics ==
=== Club ===
As of 23 May 2026

Appearances and goals by club, season and competition
| Club | Season | League | | | Domestic (Note: Appearance(s) in Bangladesh Federation Cup) | | Other | | Continental | | Total | |
| Club | Season | Division | Apps | Goals | Apps | Goals | Apps | Goals | Apps | Goals | Apps | Goals |
|---|---|---|---|---|---|---|---|---|---|---|---|---|
| Dhaka Wanderers | 2021–22 | BCL | 21 | 3 | – | | – | | – | | 21 | 3 |
| PWD | 2024–25 | BCL | 18 | 8 | – | | – | | – | | 18 | 8 |
| PWD | 2025–26 | BFL | 18 | 2 | 3 | 0 | – | | – | | 21 | 2 |
| PWD | Total | | 36 | 10 | 3 | 0 | 0 | 0 | 0 | 0 | 39 | 10 |
| Chattogram City | 2026–27 | BFL | 0 | 0 | 0 | 0 | – | | – | | 0 | 0 |
| Career total | | | 57 | 13 | 3 | 0 | 0 | 0 | 0 | 0 | 60 | 13 |

=== International ===
As of 1 October 2026

Appearances and goals by national team and year
| National team | Year | Apps | Goals |
|---|---|---|---|
Bangladesh
| Bangladesh | 2026 | 2 | 0 |
| Total | | 2 | 0 |

== Honours ==
=== Individual ===
- BCL Most Valuable Player: 2024–25
- BCL top scorer: 2024–25
