= Dawda Ceesay =

Gambian footballer (born 1993)

Personal information
- Date of birth: 25 January 1993 (age 33)
- Place of birth: Banjul, Gambia
- Height: 1.75 m (5 ft 9 in)
- Position: Midfielder

Team information
- Current team: Rahmatganj MFS
- Number: 18

Youth career
- 2009: Banjul Hawks

Senior career*
| Years | Team | Apps | (Gls) |
| 2014–2015 | Feni | | |
| 2017 | Sheikh Russel KC | 11 | (3) |
| 2017–2018 | → Rahmatganj MFS (loan) | 11 | (3) |
| 2018–2019 | Churchill Brothers | 28 | (5) |
| 2019 | Mohun Bagan | 0 | (0) |
| 2019 | Punjab | 0 | (0) |
| 2019 | Churchill Brothers | 12 | (1) |
| 2020–2021 | Al-Sadd | 27 | (2) |
| 2021 | Delhi | 0 | (0) |
| 2022 | Becamex Binh Duong | 6 | (0) |
| 2023– | Rahmatganj MFS | 12 | (2) |

International career
| 2009 | Gambia U17 | 8 | (1) |
- * Club domestic league appearances and goals as of 26 April 2024

Dawda Ceesay (born 25 January 1993) is a Gambian professional footballer who plays as a midfielder for and captains Bangladesh Premier League club Rahmatganj MFS.

He played for Gambia U-17 in the 2009 FIFA U-17 World Cup.

== Club career ==
He has been a part of several Bangladesh Premier League clubs since 2014.

=== Churchill Brothers ===
In January 2018, he joined i-League side Churchill Brothers. He scored his first goal in i-League against Indian Arrows. He joined Mohun Bagan in 2019, on loan from Churchill Brothers, ahead of the Super Cup.

=== Minerva Punjab ===
In July 2019, he joined Minerva Punjab.

=== Delhi ===
In 2021, Ceesay joined newly formed Minerva Delhi and appeared in the 130th edition of Durand Cup. He later appeared in the 2021 I-League Qualifiers, in which they finished on third position.

== International career ==
He was a part of Gambia national under-17 football team which won 2009 African U-17 Championship. He scored a goal in the 20th minute against Cameroon U17 in the group stage of the tournament. He also played all three group stage matches for Gambia in the 2009 FIFA U-17 World Cup.

== Career statistics ==
=== Club ===
As of 13 March 2022

Appearances and goals by club, season and competition
| Club | Season | League | | | Cup | | Continental | | Total | |
| Club | Season | Division | Apps | Goals | Apps | Goals | Apps | Goals | Apps | Goals |
|---|---|---|---|---|---|---|---|---|---|---|
| Sheikh Russel KC | 2017–18 | Bangladesh Premier League | 11 | 3 | 0 | 0 | — | | 11 | 3 |
| Rahmatganj MFS (loan) | 2017–18 | Bangladesh Premier League | 11 | 3 | 0 | 0 | — | | 11 | 3 |
| Churchill Brothers | 2017–18 | I-League | 11 | 2 | 2 (Note: Appearance(s) in Super Cup) | 0 | — | | 13 | 2 |
| Churchill Brothers | 2018–19 | I-League | 17 | 3 | 0 | 0 | — | | 17 | 3 |
| Churchill Brothers | 2019–20 | I-League | 12 | 1 | 0 | 0 | — | | 12 | 1 |
| Churchill Brothers | Total | | 40 | 6 | 2 | 0 | 0 | 0 | 42 | 6 |
| Delhi | 2021 | I-League 2nd Division | 0 | 0 | 4 (Note: Appearance(s) in Durand Cup) | 0 | — | | 4 | 0 |
| Becamex Binh Duong | 2022 | V.League 1 | 2 | 0 | 0 | 0 | — | | 2 | 0 |
| Career total | | | 64 | 12 | 6 | 0 | 0 | 0 | 70 | 12 |

== Honours ==
Gambia U17

- Africa U-17 Cup of Nations: 2009
