= 2026–27 Federation Cup (Bangladesh) =

38th season of the Bangladesh Federation Cup

২০২৬–২৭ ফেডারেশন কাপ

Tournament details
- Host country: Bangladesh
- Dates: 22 September 2026– TBD 2027
- Teams: 13
- Venue: 4 (in 4 host cities)

Tournament statistics
- Matches played: 11
- Goals scored: 32 (2.91 per match)
- All statistics correct as of 21 October 2026.

The 2026–27 Federation Cup is the 38th edition of the tournament, the main domestic annual top-tier club football competition in Bangladesh organized by Bangladesh Football Federation (BFF). Thirteen participants will contest in the tournament. The tournament is being played from 22 September 2026 to May 2027.

Bashundhara Kings is the current champions having defeated Mohammedan SC by 3–2 goals in the final on 20 May 2026.

== Participating teams ==
The following thirteen clubs will participate in the tournament.

Team	Appearances	Previous best performance
Arambagh KS	33rd	Runners-up (1997, 2001)
Bangladesh Police	7th	Semi-finals (2019–20, 2023–24)
Bashundhara Kings	7th	Champions (2019–20, 2020–21, 2023–24), 2025–26)
Brothers Union	35th	Champions (1980, 1991, 2005)
City Club	1st	Debut
Chattogram City	1st	Debut
Dhaka Wanderers	3rd	Runners-up (1987)
Dhaka Abahani	37th	Champions (1982, 1985, 1986, 1988, 1997, 1999, 2000, 2010, 2016, 2017, 2018, 2021–22)
Fortis FC	4th	Group stages (2022–23)
Fakirerpool YMC	3rd	Group stages (2024–25)
Mohammedan	37th	Champions (1980, 1981, 1982, 1983, 1987, 1989, 1995, 2002, 2008, 2009, 2022–23)
PWD SC	2nd	Group stages (2025–26)
Rahmatganj MFS	37th	Runners-up (2019–20, 2021–22)

== Venues ==
The matches will be played at the following four venues.

Munshigonj	Manikganj
Shaheed Bir Sreshtho Flight Lt. Matiur Rahman Stadium	Shaheed Miraj–Tapan Stadium
Capacity: 10,000	Capacity: 5,000
Location of the stadiums of 2026–27 Federation Cup (Bangladesh)
Gopalganj	Dhaka
Gopalganj Old Stadium	National Stadium
Capacity: 5,000	Capacity: 22,400

== Draw ==
The draw ceremony of the tournament was held on 12 September 2026 at 15:00 BST on the 3rd floor of BFF House, Motijheel, Dhaka, Bangladesh. The thirteen clubs were divided into two groups, and the top two teams from each group will qualify for the next round.

== Group summary ==
Group A	Group B
Dhaka Abahani	Arambagh KS
Brothers Union	Bashundhara Kings
Chattogram City	Bangladesh Police
Fortis FC	City Club
Fakirerpool YMC	Dhaka Wanderers
Rahmatganj MFS	Mohammedan SC
	PWD Sports Club

== Schedule ==
Phase	Date
Group stage	22 September 2026–12 January 2027
QRF	TBD – 2027
Final	TBD – 2027

== Group stage ==
Key to colours in group tables
Group winners will qualify for QRF 1.
Group runners-ups will advance to QRF 2.

Tiebreakers
The ranking of teams in the group stage was determined as follows:
1. Points obtained in all group matches:
  - Win: 3 points;
  - Draw: 1 point;
  - Loss: 0 points;
2. Head to head result.
3. Goal difference in all group matches;
4. Number of goals scored in all group matches.

=== Group A ===
Pos	Team	Pld	W	D	L	GF	GA	GD	Pts	Qualification
1	Brothers Union	2	1	1	0	4	1	+3	4	Qualified for QRF 1
2	Chattogram City	2	1	1	0	4	2	+2	4	Advanced to QRF 2
3	Dhaka Abahani	1	0	1	0	1	1	0	1	
4	Fortis FC	1	0	1	0	1	1	0	1	
5	Rahmatganj	2	0	1	1	1	3	−2	1	
6	Fakirerpool	2	0	1	1	2	5	−3	1	

Updated to match(es) played on 13 October 2026. Source: Soccerway
22 September 2026
15:00 BST (UTC+6)

Fortis	1–1	Fakirerpool
Insan 11'		Anik 72'

Gopalganj Old Stadium, Gopalganj
Referee: Junayed Sharif
23 September 2026
15:00 BST (UTC+6)

Brothers Union	0–0	Rahmatganj

Shaheed Miraj-Tapan Stadium, Manikganj
Referee: Md Joshim Akhter
25 September 2026
15:00 BST (UTC+6)

Dhaka Abahani	1–1	Chattogram City
Rabiul 53'		Raphael Onwrebe 63'

Shaheed Bir Sreshtho Flight Lieutenant Matiur Rahman Stadium, Munshigonj
Referee: Tapos Roy

13 October 2026
14:45 BST (UTC+6)

Brothers Union	4–1	Fakirerpool
Thiago 59' (Pen.); Ali Raza 64'; Abdul Halim 78', 80'		Sillah 16'

Shaheed Bir Sreshtho Flight Lieutenant Matiur Rahman Stadium, Munshigonj
13 October 2026
14:45 BST (UTC+6)

Rahmatganj	1–3	Chattogram City
Sakib Bepari 39'		Jafar 57' (Pen.); Kenta Hara 65'; Sayed Hossen Sayem 70'

Gopalganj Old Stadium, Gopalganj

24 November 2026
14:30 BST (UTC+6)

Dhaka Abahani	v	Fakirerpool

Shaheed Bir Sreshtho Flight Lieutenant Matiur Rahman Stadium, Munshigonj
24 November 2026
14:30 BST (UTC+6)

Chattogram City	v	Brothers Union

Shaheed Miraj-Tapan Stadium, Manikganj

8 December 2026
14:30 BST (UTC+6)

Fakirerpool	v	Rahmatganj

Shaheed Miraj-Tapan Stadium, Manikganj
8 December 2026
14:30 BST (UTC+6)

Brothers Union	v	Dhaka Abahani

National Stadium, Dhaka
8 December 2026
14:30 BST (UTC+6)

Chattogram City	v	Fortis

Shaheed Bir Sreshtho Flight Lieutenant Matiur Rahman Stadium, Munshigonj

22 December 2026
14:30 BST (UTC+6)

Dhaka Abahani	v	Rahmatganj

National Stadium, Dhaka
22 December 2026
14:30 BST (UTC+6)

Fakirerpool	v	Chattogram City

Gopalganj Old Stadium, Gopalganj
22 December 2026
14:30 BST (UTC+6)

Brothers Union	v	Fortis

Shaheed Miraj-Tapan Stadium, Manikganj

19 January 2027
14:30 BST (UTC+6)

Fortis	v	Dhaka Abahani

Shaheed Miraj-Tapan Stadium, Manikganj

26 January 2027
14:30 BST (UTC+6)

Fortis	v	Rahmatganj

National Stadium, Dhaka

=== Group B ===
Pos	Team	Pld	W	D	L	GF	GA	GD	Pts	Qualification
1	Bashundhara Kings	2	2	0	0	7	0	+7	6	Qualified for QRF 1
2	Mohammedan SC	2	1	1	0	4	2	+2	4	Advanced to QRF 2
3	Bangladesh Police	1	0	1	0	1	1	0	1	
4	PWD SC	1	0	1	0	1	1	0	1	
5	Arambagh KS	2	0	1	1	3	5	−2	1	
6	City Club	2	0	1	1	1	3	−2	1	
7	Dhaka Wanderers	2	0	1	1	2	7	−5	1	

Updated to match(es) played on 20 October 2026. Source: Soccerway
6 October 2026
15:00 BST (UTC+6)

Dhaka Wanderers	0–5	Bashundhara Kings
		Robinho 47' (pen.); Alomgir 49'; Md Abdullah 62'; Sabbir Hossen 85', 90'

Shaheed Bir Sreshtho Flight Lieutenant Matiur Rahman Stadium, Munshigonj
Referee: Anisur Rahman
6 October 2026
15:00 BST (UTC+6)

Bangladesh Police	1–1	City Club
Rassoul Ba 61' (pen.)		Okafor 90+4'

Shaheed Miraj-Tapan Stadium, Manikganj
Referee: Bito Rai Barua
6 October 2026
15:00 BST (UTC+6)

Mohammedan SC	3–1	Arambagh KS
Sourav 57'; Sohel Rana 74'; Diabate 90+4'		Suraj Rayies 16'

Gopalganj Old Stadium, Gopalganj
Referee: Symoon Hasan

20 October 2026
14:45 BST (UTC+6)

City Club	0–2	Bashundhara Kings
		Robinho 19' (pen.); Emeka 40'

Shaheed Miraj-Tapan Stadium, Manikganj
20 October 2026
14:45 BST (UTC+6)

Mohammedan SC	1–1	PWD SC
Diabate 61'		Mbida 72'

Shaheed Bir Sreshtho Flight Lieutenant Matiur Rahman Stadium, Munshigonj
20 October 2026
14:45 BST (UTC+6)

Arambagh KS	2–2	Dhaka Wanderers
Rokey 85' (pen.); Juel 88'		Bailey 14' (pen.); Dhakal 86'

Gopalganj Old Stadium, Gopalganj

1 December 2026
14:30 BST (UTC+6)

Bashundhara Kings	v	Arambagh KS

Gopalganj Old Stadium, Gopalganj
1 December 2026
14:30 BST (UTC+6)

Bangladesh Police	v	Mohammedan SC

National Stadium, Dhaka
1 December 2026
14:30 BST (UTC+6)

PWD SC	v	Dhaka Wanderers

Shaheed Bir Sreshtho Flight Lieutenant Matiur Rahman Stadium, Munshigonj

15 December 2026
14:30 BST (UTC+6)

Dhaka Wanderers	v	Bangladesh Police

Shaheed Miraj-Tapan Stadium, Manikganj
15 December 2026
14:30 BST (UTC+6)

Mohammedan SC	v	City Club

Gopalganj Old Stadium, Gopalganj
15 December 2026
14:30 BST (UTC+6)

PWD SC	v	Arambagh KS

Shaheed Bir Sreshtho Flight Lieutenant Matiur Rahman Stadium, Munshigonj

29 December 2026
14:30 BST (UTC+6)

Bashundhara Kings	v	PWD SC

National Stadium, Dhaka
29 December 2026
14:30 BST (UTC+6)

Bangladesh Police	v	Arambagh KS

Shaheed Bir Sreshtho Flight Lieutenant Matiur Rahman Stadium, Munshigonj
29 December 2026
14:30 BST (UTC+6)

City Club	v	Dhaka Wanderers

Shaheed Miraj-Tapan Stadium, Manikganj

5 January 2027
14:30 BST (UTC+6)

Bashundhara Kings	v	Mohammedan SC

Shaheed Bir Sreshtho Flight Lieutenant Matiur Rahman Stadium, Munshigonj
5 January 2027
14:30 BST (UTC+6)

Bangladesh Police	v	PWD SC

National Stadium, Dhaka
5 January 2027
14:30 BST (UTC+6)

City Club	v	Arambagh KS

Gopalganj Old Stadium, Gopalganj

12 January 2027
14:30 BST (UTC+6)

Bashundhara Kings	v	Bangladesh Police

National Stadium, Dhaka
12 January 2027
14:30 BST (UTC+6)

Mohammedan SC	v	Dhaka Wanderers

Shaheed Bir Sreshtho Flight Lieutenant Matiur Rahman Stadium, Munshigonj
12 January 2027
14:30 BST (UTC+6)

PWD SC	v	City Club

Shaheed Miraj-Tapan Stadium, Manikganj

== Qualification Round (QR) to the Final ==
=== Round dates and venues ===
Round	Date	Venues
QRF 1	TBA 2027	TBA
QRF 2	TBA 2027	TBA
QRF 3	TBA 2027	TBA
Final	TBA 2027	TBA

=== Format ===
There are no home-and-away matches in this cup competition. So, every Qualification Round (QR) to the Final matches and the Final will be played at neutral venues.

The QRF 1 winner will advance to the Final, while the loser will face the QRF 2 winner in QRF 3.

The winner of QRF 3 will face the QRF 1 winner in the Final.

=== Qualified teams ===
Group	Winners	Runners-up
A		
B		

=== Bracket ===
QRF 1
Group A Winners
Group B Winners
QRF 2
Group A runners-up
Group B runners-up

QRF 3
QRF 1 Losers
QRF 2 Winners

Final
QRF 1 Winners
QRF 3 Winners

=== Qualification Round (QR) to the Final 1 ===
TBA 2027
--:--

Group A Winners	v	Group B Winners

TBC, TBC

=== Qualification Round (QR) to the Final 2 ===
TBA 2027
--:--

Group A runners-up	v	Group B runners-up

TBC, TBC

=== Qualification Round (QR) to the Final 3 ===
TBA 2027
--:--

QRF 1 Losers	v	QRF 2 Winners

TBC, TBC

== Final ==
TBA 2027
--:--

QRF 1 Winners	v	QRF 3 Winners

TBC, TBC

== Statistics ==
=== Goalscorers ===
There have been 32 goals scored in 11 matches, for an average of 2.91 goals per match.

2 goals

- (Bangladesh) Abdul Halim (Brothers Union)
- (Bangladesh) Md. Sabbir Hossen (Brothers Union)
- (Brazil) Robson Azevedo (Bashundhara Kings)
- (Mali) Souleymane Diabate (Dhaka Mohammedan)

1 goal

- (Australia) Angus Bailey (Dhaka Wanderers)
- (Bangladesh) Alomgir Molla (Bashundhara Kings)
- (Bangladesh) Insan Hossain (Fortis FC)
- (Bangladesh) Jafar Iqbal (Chattogram City FC)
- (Bangladesh) Md Rokey (Arambagh KS)
- (Bangladesh) Mohammad Abdullah (Bashundhara Kings)
- (Bangladesh) Rabiul Hasan (Dhaka Abahani)
- (Bangladesh) Sakib Bepari (Rahmatganj MFS)
- (Bangladesh) Samin Yasar Juel (Arambagh KS)
- (Bangladesh) Sayed Hossen Sayem (Chattogram City FC)
- (Bangladesh) Sohel Rana Jr. (Dhaka Mohammedan)
- (Bangladesh) Sourav Dewan (Dhaka Mohammedan)
- (Bangladesh) Tamim Hossain Anik (Fakirerpool YMC)
- (Brazil) Thiago Lima (Brothers Union)
- (Cameroon) Yohan Mbida (PWD Sports Club)
- (The Gambia) Sulayman Sillah (Fakirerpool YMC)
- (Ghana) Suraj Rayies (Arambagh KS)
- (Japan) Kenta Hara (Chattogram City FC)
- (Nepal) Yuvraj Dhakal (Dhaka Wanderers)
- (Nigeria) Emeka Ogbugh (Bashundhara Kings)
- (Nigeria) Onyekachi Okafor (City Club)
- (Nigeria) Raphael Onwrebe (Chattogram City FC)
- (Pakistan) Syed Ali Raza (Brothers Union)
- (Senegal) Rassoul Ba (Bangladesh Police FC)
