= Jafar Iqbal =

Bangladeshi footballer

Personal information
- Date of birth: 27 September 1999 (age 27)
- Place of birth: Bandarban, Bangladesh
- Height: 1.65 m (5 ft 5 in)
- Position: Left winger

Team information
- Current team: Chattogram City
- Number: 11

Senior career*
Years	Team	Apps	(Gls)
2015–2016	Dilkusha	17	(9)
2016	Arambagh	21	(4)
2017–2018	Chittagong Abahani	15	(1)
2018–2020	Saif	19	(1)
2020–2024	Mohammedan	71	(9)
2024–2026	Dhaka Abahani	13	(2)
2026–	Chattogram City	2	(1)

International career^{‡}
2017	Bangladesh U20	6	(5)
2017–2023	Bangladesh U23	7	(0)
2016–2022	Bangladesh	9	(1)
Medal record
Representing Bangladesh
SAFF U-18 Championship
Runner-up	2017 Bhutan	Team
- * Club domestic league appearances and goals as of 24 October 2026 ‡ National team caps and goals as of 11 June 2022

Jafar Iqbal (Bengali: জাফর ইকবাল; born 27 September 1999) is a Bangladeshi professional footballer who can play on either wings preferably on the left. He currently plays for Bangladesh Football League club Chattogram City.

== Club career ==
=== Early career ===
In 2014, Jafar scored six goals in three matches for Agrabad Comrades in the Chittagong Second Division League. Jafar won the Top Scorer Player Award as his team clinched the league title. He then proceeded to score 13 goals for Motherbari Sobhoniya Club in the Chittagong Pioneer League.

Jafar also participated in the BFF U-18 Development Cup with Feni SC before coach Syed Golam Jilani arranged his move to Dilkusha SC in the Dhaka Third Division League in 2015. He scored 9 goals, including a hat-trick, which helped Dilkusha secure the league championship.

=== Arambagh KS ===
Jafar started his professional career in 2016 when he was signed by Saiful Bari Titu with Arambagh KS. On August 9, 2016, Jafar scored his first professional league goal against Brothers Union during 2016 Bangladesh Premier League. Jafar scored a cracker against Team BJMC in the semi-final of 2016 Federation Cup and helped his team to reach up in the final. His combination with Mohammad Abdullah worked superbly for Arambagh KS as they finished the premier league season in sixth position.

=== Chittagong Abahani ===
After a successful season with Arambagh KS, in April 2017 Jafar joined the emerging Chittagong Abahani. However, under coach Saiful Bari Titu, Jafar could not cement a starting spot in the team and only scored a single goal all season, which came against relegation threatened Team BJMC.

=== Saif SC ===
On 10 December 2019, Jafar joined corporate owned Saif Sporting Club. Nonetheless, it was another disappointing season for him, scoring only a single goal in 17 league appearance, and in turn losing his place in the senior national team.

=== Mohammedan SC ===
On 10 December 2020, Jafar joined Dhaka giants Mohammedan SC, from Saif Sporting Club for a transfer fee of Tk 1.5 lakh. The deal was the first instance of a transfer fee being paid in Bangladeshi club football.

Jafar was ruled out for six week after injuring his knee during a 2021–22 Independence Cup game against Saif SC.

== International career ==
=== Youth ===
Jafar made his Bangladesh U18 debut against India during 2017 SAFF U-18 Championship. He led his team to a stunning 4–3 win overcoming three goals deficit at the break against India U18 with a superb brace both coming from headers.

Jafar was the Golden boot award winner in 2017 SAFF U-18 Championship for scoring 5 goals from 4 matches. He also had an assist in that sensational match against India. Since making his top tier debut for Arambagh KS in 2016 domestic season, he has been considered to hold a bright future for Bangladesh football.

Jafar made his Olympic team debut against Nepal U23 on July 11, 2017, during an International friendly match.

=== Senior team ===
Jafar made his senior team debut against Maldives on September 1, 2016, during an International friendly match. He scored his first goal against Laos on 27 March 2018.

== International goals ==
=== Bangladesh U20 ===
#	Date	Venue	Opponent	Score	Result	Competition
1.	18 September 2017	Changlimithang Stadium, Thimphu	India U18	1–3	4–3	2017 SAFF U-18 Championship
2.	18 September 2017	Changlimithang Stadium, Thimphu	India U18	4–3	4–3	2017 SAFF U-18 Championship
3.	20 September 2017	Changlimithang Stadium, Thimphu	Maldives U18	2–0	2–0	2017 SAFF U-18 Championship
4.	27 September 2017	Changlimithang Stadium, Thimphu	Bhutan U18	1–0	2–0	2017 SAFF U-18 Championship
5.	27 September 2017	Changlimithang Stadium, Thimphu	Bhutan U18	2–0	2–0	2017 SAFF U-18 Championship

=== National team ===
Scores and results list Bangladesh's goal tally first.

#	Date	Venue	Opponent	Score	Result	Competition
1.	27 March 2018	New Laos National Stadium, Vientiane	Laos	1–2	2–2	Friendly

== Honours ==
Mohammedan SC

- Federation Cup: 2022–23

Dilkusha SC

- Dhaka Third Division League: 2015

Awards

- Kool-BSPA Footballer of the Year: 2017
- SAFF U-18 Championship Top Scorer: 2017
