= Bishwanath Ghosh (footballer) =

Bangladeshi footballer

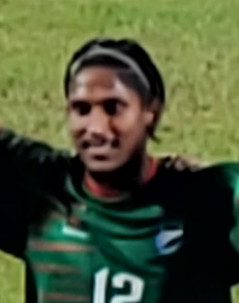
- Bishwanath with Bangladesh in 2023

Personal information
- Full name: Bishwanath Ghosh
- Date of birth: 30 May 1999 (age 27)
- Place of birth: Tangail, Bangladesh
- Height: 1.68 m (5 ft 6 in)
- Positions: Right-back; centre-back

Team information
- Current team: Bashundhara Kings
- Number: 12

Senior career*
Years	Team	Apps	(Gls)
2015–16	Victoria SC		
2016–17	Mohammedan SC		
2017–19	Sheikh Russel KC	44	(0)
2019–	Bashundhara Kings	106	(0)

International career^{‡}
2015–17	Bangladesh U20	8	(1)
2017–19	Bangladesh U23	10	(0)
2018–	Bangladesh	47	(0)
Medal record
Representing Bangladesh
SAFF U-18 Championship
Runner-up	2017 Bhutan	Team
South Asian Games
Bronze medal – third place	2019 Kathmandu	Team
- * Club domestic league appearances and goals as of 6 June 2026 ‡ National team caps and goals as of 5 November 2026

Bishwanath Ghosh (Bengali: বিশ্বনাথ ঘোষ; Bengali pronunciation: [biʃʃonath ɡʱoʃ]; born 30 May 1999) is a Bangladeshi professional footballer who plays as a defender for Bangladesh Premier League club Bashundhara Kings and the Bangladesh national team.

== International career ==
On 4 September 2018, Bishwanath made his senior international debut against Bhutan in 2018 SAFF Championship.

== Career statistics ==
=== International ===
As of 5 November 2026.

National team	Year	Apps	Goals
Bangladesh	2018	5	0
Bangladesh	2019	6	0
Bangladesh	2020	5	1
Bangladesh	2021	5	1
Bangladesh	2022	7	2
Bangladesh	2023	11	0
Bangladesh	2024	4	0
Bangladesh	2026	4	0
Total		47	0

==== International goals ====
===== Youth =====
#	Date	Venue	Opponent	Score	Result	Competition
1	8 November 2017	Central Stadium, Hisor, Tajikistan	Sri Lanka U19	1–0	4–0	2018 AFC U-19 Championship qualification

===== Senior =====
#	Date	Venue	Opponent	Score	Result	Competition
-	15 March 2023	Prince Mohammed bin Abdulaziz Stadium, Medina, Saudi Arabia	Malawi	1–1	1–1	Unofficial FIFA friendly

== Personal life ==
Bishwanath married his childhood girlfriend Chaity Ghosh in January 2020 in middle of 2020 Bangabandhu Cup. He took a three-hour break from his head coach during practise session for the same.

From religious views, Bishwanath is a follower of Hinduism.

== Honours ==
Bashundhara Kings

- Bangladesh Premier League: 2020–21, 2021–22, 2022–23, 2023–24
- Independence Cup: 2022–23, 2023–24; runner-up: 2021-22
- Federation Cup: 2019–20, 2020–21; third place: 2022–23
