= Shaheed Miraj–Tapan Stadium =

Football ground in Manikganj, Bangladesh

- Location within Bangladesh
- Location: Manikganj, Bangladesh
- Coordinates: 23°51′34.19″N 89°59′57.01″E
- Owner: National Sports Council
- Operator: National Sports Council
- Capacity: 5,000
- Surface: grass
- Acreage: 3.98 Acres

Construction
- Opened: 1963

Tenants
- Rahmatganj MFS; Manikganj Football Team

Shaheed Miraj–Tapan Stadium, also known as Manikganj Stadium, is a football ground in Manikganj, Bangladesh. From 2019–20 season of Bangladesh Premier League football club Rahmatganj MFS have played their home matches at this ground. This is only stadium in the Manikganj district, built in 1963 on 3.98 acres of land. There is a two-storied building with 10 rooms and a gallery for 5000.

The stadium is named for A. K. M. Miraj Uddin and Tapan Chowdhury, both martyrs of the Bangladesh Liberation War.

== See also ==
- Stadiums in Bangladesh
- List of football stadiums in Bangladesh
