= Sushanto Tripura =

Bangladeshi footballer

Personal information
- Full name: Sushanto Tripura
- Date of birth: 5 October 1998 (age 28)
- Place of birth: Cox's Bazar, Bangladesh
- Positions: Center-back; right-back

Team information
- Current team: Dhaka Abahani
- Number: 15

Senior career*
Years	Team	Apps	(Gls)
2013–2016	Farashganj SC	29	(0)
2016–2017	Feni Soccer Club	22	(1)
2017–2018	Chittagong Abahani	20	(1)
2018	Saif Sporting Club	0	(0)
2018–2021	Bashundhara Kings	30	(1)
2021–2023	Dhaka Abahani	31	(0)
2023–2024	Rahmatganj MFS	14	(0)
2024–2025	Brothers Union	15	(0)
2025–	Dhaka Abahani	0	(0)

International career^{‡}
2018–2019	Bangladesh U23	13	(0)
2018–	Bangladesh	7	(0)
- * Club domestic league appearances and goals as of 27 May 2025 ‡ National team caps and goals as of 16 November 2021

Sushanto Tripura (Bengali: সুশান্ত ত্রিপুরা; born 5 October 1998) is a Bangladeshi professional footballer who plays as a defender for Bangladesh Premier League club Abahani Limited Dhaka and the Bangladesh national team.

== Early life ==
Sushanto was born in Cox's Bazar in Chittagong Division, and hails from the ethnic Tripuri community.

== International career ==
On 5 October 2018, Sushanto made his senior international debut against Philippines at the 2018 Bangabandhu Cup.

== Honours ==
Bashundhara Kings

- Bangladesh Premier League: 2020–21, 2018–19
- Federation Cup: 2020–21

Abahani Limited Dhaka

- Independence Cup: 2021–22
- Federation Cup: 2021–22
