= Mostafa Kahraba =

Egyptian footballer (born 1987)

Personal information
- Full name: Mostafa Mahmoud Kahraba
- Date of birth: 10 November 1987 (age 39)
- Place of birth: Egypt
- Height: 1.72 m (5 ft 8 in)
- Position: Midfielder

Team information
- Current team: Chattogram City
- Number: 98

Senior career*
Years	Team	Apps	(Gls)
	Wadi Degla	16	(1)
- Ittihad El Shorta SC
- Petrojet
2018–2019	Al-Hejaz		
2019	TC Sports Club		
2020	Arambagh	5	(0)
2020–2022	Uttar Baridhara	42	(6)
2022–2023	Ageya Chalo Sangha		
2023	Chittagong Abahani	10	(1)
2023	→ Dhaka Abahani (loan)	0	(0)
2023–2024	Brothers Union	9	(0)
2024–2025	Rahmatganj	25	(1)
2025–2026	Fakirerpool	17	(1)
2026–	Chattogram City	0	(0)
- * Club domestic league appearances and goals as of 23 May 2026

Mostafa Mahmoud Kahraba (Arabic: مصطفى كهربا; born 10 November 1987) is an Egyptian professional footballer who plays as an attacking midfielder for Bangladesh Premier League club Chattogram City.

== Career ==
Before the 2019 season, Kahraba signed for Maldivian side TC Sports Club.

Ahead the 2020–21 season, he signed for Bangladesh Premier League side Arambagh KS in Bangladesh.

In December 2020, he joined Uttar Baridhara Club of same top flight. He scored six goals and assisted 11 times in 42 league appearances for Baridhara. However, his team suffered relegation in 2021-22 Premier League season.

In October 2022, Mostafa joined Indian club Agiye Chalo Sangha. The club plays in Chandra Memorial A Division League, the top-tier league of Tripura region and overall fourth tier of Indian football league system.

On 14 March 2023, he came back to top-level football as he joined Bangladesh Premier League club Chittagong Abahani.

On 1 August 2023, Mostafa has joined fellow top-tier side Dhaka Abahani on loan for 2023–24 AFC Cup qualifying play-off match. He came back to Chittagong Abahani at the end of the month as Dhaka Abahani couldn't progress further in that tournament.

In October 2023, Mostafa joined Brothers Union, a newly promoted club from the Bangladesh Premier League, on permanent deal. He was highest assist provider after the first phase of 2023–24 Bangladesh Premier League with eight assists in nine matches.

In March 2024, he moved to Rahmatganj MFS of the same league in middle of the season.
