= Chattogram City FC =

Chattogram City
- Full name: Chattogram City Football Club
- Nickname: Port City Pride
- Short name: CCFC
- Founded: 2010; 16 years ago (as Bangladesh Boys Club)
- Ground: Munshiganj Stadium
- Capacity: 10,000
- Owner(s): Muhammad Nazim Uddin , Md Asadul Islam
- Head Coach: Eleta Kingsley
- League: Bangladesh Football League
- 2025–26: Bangladesh Championship League, 1st of 10 (promoted)
| Home colours | Away colours |

Chattogram City Football Club (Bengali: চট্টগ্রাম সিটি ফুটবল ক্লাব, Bengali pronunciation: [tʃɔʈʈoɡram siti fuʈbɔl klab]), commonly known as Chattogram City, is a professional football club from Chattogram, Bangladesh. The club currently participates in the Bangladesh Football League, the first-tier of Bangladeshi football, having earned promotion from the Bangladesh Championship League in the 2025–26 season. It was initially formed as Bangladesh Boys Club in 2010, before being renamed in 2025.

== History ==
Established in Chattogram, Bangladesh, the club initially competed in the CJKS-CDFA Football League in the port city under the name Bangladesh Boys Club. It later rebranded as Chattogram City FC in 2025, due to another club with the same name being present in the Dhaka. The club obtained a professional league licence and formed a squad to compete in the second-tier of Bangladeshi football, from the 2025–26 Bangladesh Championship League. The team featured 17 players from Chittagong, alongside several experienced recruits from Dhaka.

On 26 January 2026, Chattogram City began their Championship League campaign with a 1–0 victory over Suktara Jubo Sangsad at the Bashundhara Kings Arena, with Didarul Islam Soinik scoring the decisive goal.

== Current squad ==
As of 19 November 2026

Note: Flags indicate national team as defined under FIFA eligibility rules; some limited exceptions apply. Players may hold more than one non-FIFA nationality.

| No. | Pos. | Nation | Player |
|---|---|---|---|
| 1 | GK | BAN | Shanto Kumer Ray |
| 2 | DF | BAN | Mahbub Alam |
| 4 | DF | BAN | Mehedi Hasan Mithu |
| 5 | DF | NEP | Diwakar Chaudhary |
| 6 | DF | GHA | Kofi Junior Debanka |
| 7 | FW | JPN | Kenta Hara |
| 8 | MF | BAN | Koushik Barua |
| 9 | FW | NGR | Raphael Odoyin Onwrebe |
| 11 | FW | BAN | Jafar Iqbal |
| 12 | FW | BAN | Minhazul Karim Shadin |
| 13 | GK | BAN | Md Sarwar Jahan |
| 14 | MF | NEP | Aashish Sonam |
| 15 | DF | BAN | Nikson Chakma |
| 16 | MF | BAN | Shahidul Islam |
| 17 | FW | BAN | Md Sarower Zaman Nipu |
| 18 | DF | BAN | Md Rasel Hossain |
| 19 | FW | BAN | Md Amiruzzaman Saymon |

| No. | Pos. | Nation | Player |
|---|---|---|---|
| 20 | FW | BAN | Sumon Reza |
| 21 | DF | BAN | Shakir Ahmed |
| 22 | GK | BAN | Md Bappi Hasan |
| 23 | MF | BAN | Tonmoy Das |
| 24 | FW | BAN | Sayed Hossen Sayem |
| 26 | DF | BAN | Md Khorshed Alam |
| 27 | FW | BAN | Mohannad Habib |
| 29 | DF | BAN | Asadul Islam Sakib |
| 30 | GK | BAN | Iftar Bin Md. Farhad |
| 44 | DF | BAN | Md Rostom Islam Dukhu Mia |
| 45 | MF | BAN | Md Asadur Jaman Ataul |
| 47 | FW | BAN | Radowan Hasan |
| 49 | FW | BAN | Mohammad Atiqur Rahman |
| 66 | FW | BAN | Md Abdullah Noman Dipu |
| 77 | MF | BAN | Borhan Uddin |
| 80 | MF | BAN | Sanjay Sardar Sandul Karim |
| 98 | MF | EGY | Mostafa Kahraba |

== Current technical staff ==
=== Coaching staff ===
As of 25 January 2026

| Position | Name |
|---|---|
| Head coach | (Bangladesh) Eleta Kingsley |
| Team manager | (Bangladesh) Md Mohsin Ali Badsha |
| Team leader | (Bangladesh) Abdul Alim |
| Vice president | (Bangladesh) MD Asadul Islam |
| Media officer | (Bangladesh) Masudur Rahman |
| Security officer | (Bangladesh) Abul Kalam Azad Nazim's Brother |
| Masseur | (Bangladesh) Symoon Hossen (Bangladesh) Hridoy Mitra |

== Team records ==
=== Head coach's record ===
As of 19 November 2026

| Coach | From | To | P | W | D | L | GS | GA | %W |
|---|---|---|---|---|---|---|---|---|---|
| (Bangladesh) Md Shahidul Islam | 5 January 2026 | 31 July 2026 | 18 | 13 | 3 | 2 | 32 | 11 | 72.22 |
| (Chile) Julio Moreno Rayneld-Franco | 9 August 2026 | 2 November 2026 | 7 | 1 | 1 | 5 | 6 | 20 | 14.29 |

== Honours ==
- Bangladesh Championship League
  - Champions (1): 2025–26
