= Munshiganj Stadium =

Stadium in Munshigonj, Bangladesh

Coordinates: 23°32′52.74″N 90°32′12.01″E

Shaheed Bir Sreshtho Flight Lt. Matiur Rahman Stadium
- শহীদ বীরশ্রেষ্ঠ ফ্লাইট লেফটেন্যান্ট মতিউর রহমান স্টেডিয়াম
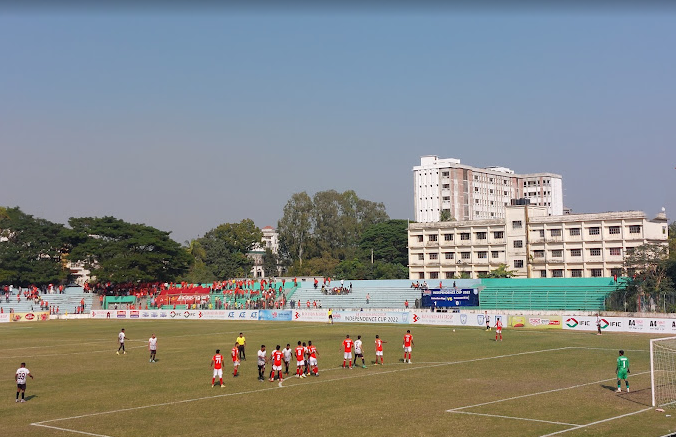
- Dhaka Mohammedan & Bashundhara Kings playing in the venue in 2022
- Interactive map of Shaheed Bir Sreshtho Flight Lt. Matiur Rahman Stadium
- Location: Munshigonj, Bangladesh
- Owner: National Sports Council
- Operator: National Sports Council
- Capacity: 8,000–10,000
- Surface: Grass

Construction
- Opened: 1998

Tenants
- Rahmatganj MFS; Chittagong Abahani (2023 to present); Munshigonj Cricket Team; Munshigonj Football Team; Naba Nabin Somabesh Club

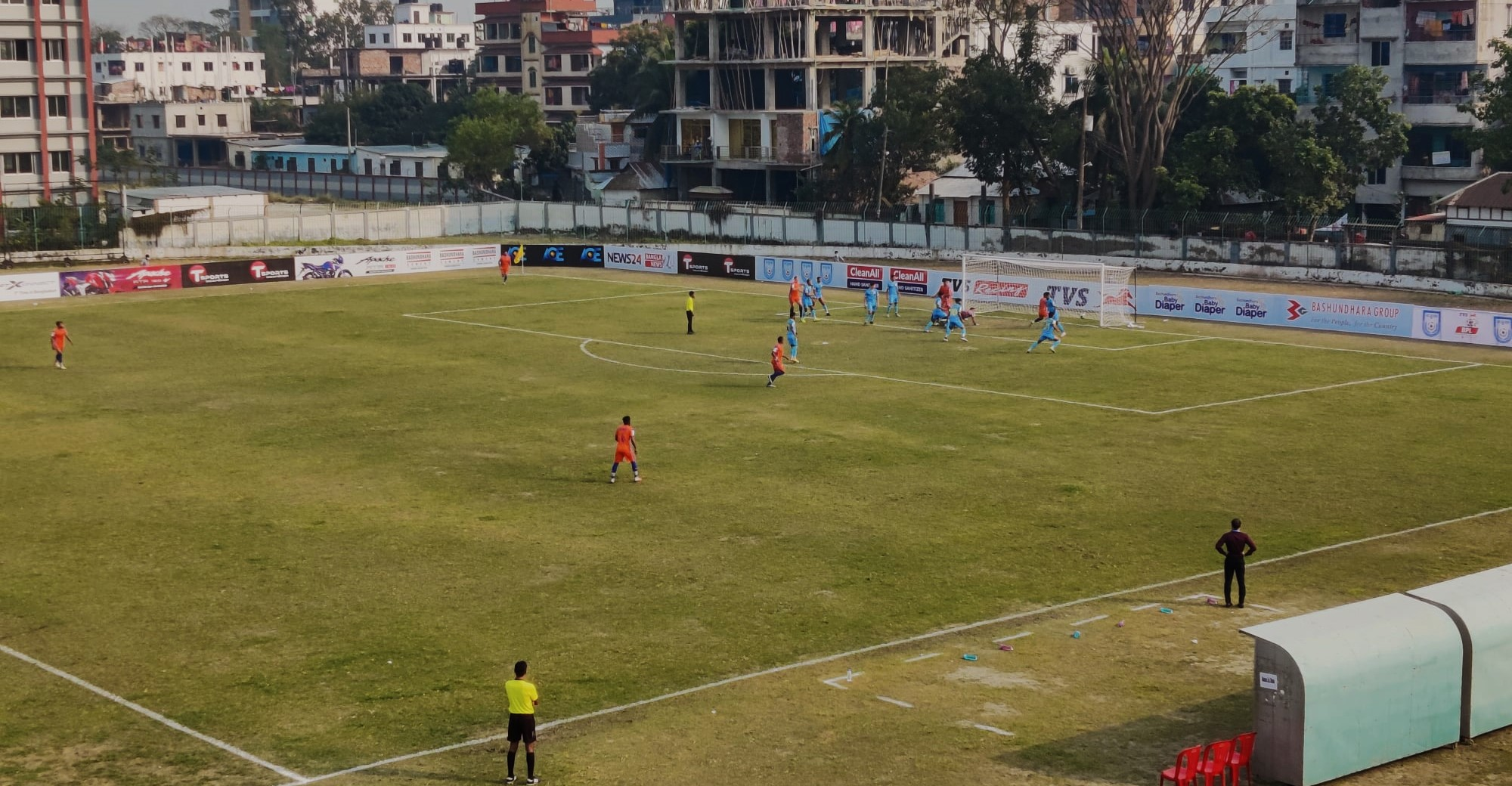
Munshiganj District Stadium

Munshiganj Stadium (Bengali: মুন্সীগঞ্জ স্টেডিয়াম), officially Shaheed Bir Sreshtho Flight Lieutenant Matiur Rahman Stadium, is a multi-purpose stadium located near Haraganga College, Munshigonj, Bangladesh. The ground is used for football and cricket.

== See also ==
- Stadiums in Bangladesh
- List of football stadiums in Bangladesh
- List of cricket grounds in Bangladesh
