= 2022 Bhutan Premier League =

Bhutan Premier League
- Season: 2022
- Champions: Paro
- 2023–24 AFC Cup: Paro
- Matches: 90
- Goals: 364 (4.04 per match)
- Top goalscorer: Kazuo Homma (34 goals)
- Biggest home win: Transport United 12–1 Paro Rinpung
- Biggest away win: Takin 2–8 RTC FC
- Highest scoring: Transport United 12–1 Paro Rinpung

The 2022 Bhutan Premier League was the eleventh season of the unified league, rebranded as the Bhutan Premier League since 2019 (previously the Bhutan National League), the top national football competition in Bhutan.

== Teams ==
=== Stadiums and locations ===
Stadium locations of the 2022 Bhutan Premier League

Team	Stadium	Location	Capacity
BFF Academy U-19	Changlimithang Stadium	Thimphu	15,000
Druk Lhayul	Changlimithang Stadium	Thimphu	15,000
Paro FC	Woochu Sports Arena	Paro	1,000
Paro Rinpung	Woochu Sports Arena	Paro	1,000
Royal Thimphu College FC	Changlimithang Stadium	Thimphu	15,000
FC Takin	Changlimithang Stadium	Thimphu	15,000
Tensung	Changlimithang Stadium	Thimphu	15,000
Thimphu City	Changlimithang Stadium	Thimphu	15,000
Transport United	Changlimithang Stadium	Thimphu	15,000
Ugyen Academy	Lekeythang Football Field	Punakha	10,000

== League table ==
Pos	Team	Pld	W	D	L	GF	GA	GD	Pts	Qualification or relegation
1	Paro (C)	18	15	3	0	65	8	+57	48	Qualification for AFC Cup preliminary round 1
2	Thimphu City	18	13	4	1	48	12	+36	43	
3	Druk Lhayul	18	12	4	2	38	18	+20	40	
4	Royal Thimphu College FC	18	9	3	6	44	25	+19	30	
5	Transport United	18	8	4	6	54	23	+31	28	
6	Ugyen Academy	18	7	4	7	33	31	+2	25	
7	BFF Academy U-19	18	5	2	11	29	42	−13	17	
8	Tensung	18	4	2	12	17	44	−27	14	
9	FC Takin	18	2	0	16	15	78	−63	6	
10	Paro Rinpung	18	1	2	15	21	83	−62	5	

Source: Soccerway
(C) Champions

== Seasonal statistics ==
=== Top goalscorers ===
Rank	Player	Team	Goals
1	(Japan) Kazuo Homma	Paro	34
2	(Bhutan) Tsenda Dorji	Transport United	16
3	(Nigeria) Ekomobong Victor Philip	Druk Lhayul	11
3	(Bhutan) Chencho Gyeltshen	Paro	11
5	(Bhutan) Santa Kumar Limbu	Ugyen Academy	10
6	(Bhutan) Nima Tshering	Thimphu City	9
7	(India) Aakash Dave	Transport United	7
7	(Trinidad and Tobago) Jomoul François	Druk Lhayul	7
7	(Bhutan) Dawa Tshering	Thimphu City	7
10	(Bhutan) Pemba Tshering	Paro Rinpung	6
10	(Bhutan) Orgyen Tshering	Thimphu City	6

=== Hat-tricks ===
Player	For	Against	Result	Date	Round
(Bhutan) Chencho Gyeltshen	Paro	Tensung	8–0	15 August 2022	1
(Japan) Kazuo Homma^{5}	Paro	Tensung	8–0	15 August 2022	1
(Bhutan) Rinzin Dorji	BFF Academy U-19	Paro Rinpung	5–1	24 August 2022	2
(Bhutan) Tsenda Dorji	Transport United	Tensung	3–1	10 September 2022	5
(India) Aakash Dave^{4}	Transport United	Paro Rinpung	0–8	16 September 2022	5
(Japan) Kazuo Honma	Paro	Paro Rinpung	6–0	22 September 2022	6
(Japan) Kazuo Honma	Paro	BFF Academy	6–0	8 October 2022	7
(Bhutan) Pemba Tshering	Paro Rinpung	Takin	5–2	12 October 2022	7
(Japan) Kazuo Honma	Paro	Royal TC	3–1	17 October 2022	8
(Bhutan) Nima Tshering	Thimphu City	Takin	7–1	18 November 2022	11
(Bhutan) Santa Kumar Limbu	Ugyen Academy	Tensung	4–1	21 November 2022	12
(Bhutan) Tsenda Dorji	Transport United	Takin	7–1	2 December 2022	13
(Japan) Kazuo Honma	Paro	Ugyen Academy	4–0	3 December 2022	14
(Bhutan) Sampa Tshering	Druk Lhayul	Takin	6–0	6 December 2022	14
(Japan) Kazuo Honma^{4}	Paro	Transport United	5–0	16 December 2022	16
(Bhutan) Tsenda Dorji	Transport United	Paro Rinpung	12–1	21 December 2022	17
(Bhutan) Pemba Tshering	Paro Rinpung	Ugyen Academy	6–7	1 January 2023	18
(Bhutan) Santa Kumar Limbu^{4}	Ugyen Academy	Paro Rinpung	6–7	1 January 2023	18
(Bhutan) Sherub Dorji	RTC FC	Takin	2–8	3 January 2023	18

- ^{5} Player scored 5 goals
- ^{4} Player scored 4 goals
