= 2024–25 Mohammedan SC (Dhaka) season =

Mohammedan SC (Dhaka) 2024–25 football season

Mohammedan SC
2024–25 season
- President: Md Abdul Mubeen
- Head coach: Alfaz Ahmed
- Stadium: Shaheed Dhirendranath Datta Stadium
- Bangladesh Premier League: Champions
- Federation Cup: Group stage
- Independence Cup: Not held
- Challenge Cup: Runners-up
- Top goalscorer: League: Souleyman Diabate 19 goals All: Souleyman Diabate 21 goals
- Biggest win: 6–0 v Dhaka Wanderers (Away); 29 November 2024 (Premier League); 6–0 v Chittagong Abahani (Neutral); 24 November 2024 (Federation Cup)
- Biggest defeat: 0–1 v Fakirerpool YMC (Home); 24 January 2025 (Premier League) 3–4 v Rahmatganj MFS (Home); 21 May 2025 (Premier League); 1–0 v Rahmatganj MFS (Neutral); 10 December 2024 (Federation Cup) 1–0 v Dhaka Abahani (Neutral); 7 January 2024 (Federation Cup)
Home colours	Away colours

The 2024–25 season was Mohammedan SC Dhaka's 89th season in existence and 17th consecutive season in Bangladesh Premier League since its establishment in 2007. In addition to domestic league, Mohammedan participated in the season's edition of the Challenge Cup and Federation Cup. The season covered the period from 1 June 2024 to 31 May 2025.

== Management ==
Position	Staff
Board of directors
President	(Bangladesh) Md Abdul Mubeen
Director in charge	(Bangladesh) Kazi Firoz Rashid
Chairman	(Bangladesh) Ghulam Mohammed Alamgir
Technical Committee
Head	(Bangladesh) Imtiaz Sultan Johnny
Member	(Bangladesh) Hasanuzzaman Khan Bablu
Member	(Bangladesh) Rumman Bin Wali Sabbir
Member	(Bangladesh) Elias Hossain
Member	(Bangladesh) Jasimuddin Joshi
Member	(Bangladesh) Fazlur Rahman Babul
Coaching Staff
Head Coach	(Bangladesh) Alfaz Ahmed
Assistant Coach	(Bangladesh) Abdul Kayum Sentu
Goalkeeper Coach	(Bangladesh) Sayeed Hassan Kanan
Physiotherapist	(Bangladesh) Md Nurul Islam
Team Manager	(Bangladesh) Imtiaz Ahmed Nakib
Assistant manager	(Bangladesh) Sayed Mohammad Abdul Kabbar Siddique
Masseur	(Bangladesh) Md Ubadullah
Masseur	(Bangladesh) Md Arman Hosen

== Players ==
As of 1 March 2025

No.	Player	Nat.	Position(s)	Date of birth	Year signed	Previous club
Goalkeepers
1	Sujon Hossain	(Bangladesh)	GK	5 August 1996 (aged 27)	2019	Sheikh Jamal DC
22	Shakib Al Hasan	(Bangladesh)	GK	11 November 2004 (aged 19)	2020	Youth System
30	Md Alamgir Hossen	(Bangladesh)	GK		2023	Bangladesh Army
33	Md Ismail Hossain Mahin	(Bangladesh)	GK	28 October 2007 (aged 16)	2024	BFF Elite Academy
40	Maksudur Rahman Mostak	(Bangladesh)	GK	19 October 1990 (aged 33)	2022	Muktijoddha Sangsad
Defenders
2	Sazal Hasan Kalin	(Bangladesh)	RB	5 July 1995 (aged 28)	2022	Swadhinata KS
3	Mounzir Coulidiati	(Burkina Faso)	CB	30 May 1998 (aged 26)	2024	(Thailand) Ubon Kruanapat
4	Mehedi Hasan Mithu	(Bangladesh)	CB	24 October 1994 (aged 29)	2022	Bashundhara Kings
5	Emmanuel Tony	(Nigeria)	CB	21 November 1992 (aged 31)	2023	(Nigeria) Lobi Stars
6	Jahid Hasan Shanto	(Bangladesh)	RB/CB	1 January 2003 (aged 21)	2022	Fakirerpool YMC
26	Md Azizul Hoque Ananto	(Bangladesh)	LB	19 July 2005 (aged 18)	2024	BFF Elite Academy
27	Joynal Abedin Dipu	(Bangladesh)	LB	12 December 2001 (aged 22)	2024	Sheikh Jamal DC
28	Hafizur Rahman Babu	(Bangladesh)	RB	1 January 1998 (aged 26)	2023	Wari Club
29	Shakil Ahad Topu	(Bangladesh)	CB/DM	6 April 2006 (aged 18)	2022	Uttara FC
31	Mahbub Alam	(Bangladesh)	RB/LB	22 June 1996 (aged 27)	2023	Bangladesh Army
32	Rajib Hossain	(Bangladesh)	CB	10 March 2005 (aged 19)	2024	Sheikh Jamal DC
55	Riyadul Hasan Rafi	(Bangladesh)	CB/RB	29 December 1999 (aged 24)	2024	Dhaka Abahani
Midfielders
7	Minhajul Abedin Ballu	(Bangladesh)	DM	16 September 2001 (aged 22)	2021	Muktijoddha Sangsad
8	Sanowar Hossain Lal	(Bangladesh)	AM/LM	1 April 2003 (aged 21)	2022	Rahmatganj MFS
15	Alamgir Kabir Rana	(Bangladesh)	CM/AM	7 June 1990 (aged 33)	2022	Bashundhara Kings
16	Md Jewel	(Bangladesh)	AM/LM	10 February 1995 (aged 29)	2023	Sheikh Russel KC
17	Muzaffar Muzaffarov	(Uzbekistan)	CM	12 April 1995 (aged 29)	2022	(Uzbekistan) FC Dinamo Samarqand
20	Moinul Islam Moin	(Bangladesh)	CM/AM	18 February 2005 (aged 19)	2022	Uttara FC
21	Omar Faruk Babu	(Bangladesh)	CM/DM	5 August 1994 (aged 29)	2023	Sheikh Jamal DC
23	Rakibul Islam	(Bangladesh)	CM	20 February 2003 (aged 21)	2023	Victoria SC
24	Ashraful Haque Asif	(Bangladesh)	CM	5 June 2005 (aged 18)	2020	Youth System
Forwards
9	Rahim Uddin	(Bangladesh)	RW/LW	3 June 1999 (aged 24)	2024	Dhaka Abahani
10	Souleymane Diabate	(Mali)	CF	23 March 1991 (aged 33)	2019	(Vietnam) Long An FC
11	Arif Hossain	(Bangladesh)	LW	31 December 2001 (aged 22)	2022	Uttar Baridhara Club
18	Sourav Dewan	(Bangladesh)	CF	15 June 1998 (aged 25)	2023	Dhaka Wanderers Club
37	Sunday Emmanuel	(Nigeria)	FW	25 February 1992 (aged 32)	2023	(Jordan) Al-Jalil SC
38	Raju Ahmed Zisan	(Bangladesh)	RW	10 February 2005 (aged 19)	2023	Gopalganj SC
39	Edward Morillo	(Venezuela)	CF//RW/LW	28 July 1996 (aged 27)	2025	(Nicaragua) Managua FC
Left during the season
44	Md Ibrahim Hossain	(Bangladesh)	GK	5 January 2000 (aged 24)	2024	Sheikh Russel KC
25	Apu Ahmed	(Bangladesh)	CB	30 April 1992 (aged 32)	2024	PWD SC
14	Ernest Boateng	(Ghana)	CF	6 June 2001 (aged 22)	2024	Rahmatganj MFS
17	Emtiyaz Raihan	(Bangladesh)	CF/RW	27 August 1997 (aged 26)	2024	Chittagong Abahani

== Transfer ==
=== In ===
No.	Pos	Player	Previous club	Fee	Date	Source
14	FW	(Ghana) Ernest Boateng	Rahmatganj MFS	Free	3 June 2024	
32	DF	Rajib Hossain	Sheikh Jamal DC	Free	9 June 2024	
26	DF	Azizul Haque Ananto	Brothers Union	Free	9 June 2024	
33	GK	Md Ismail Hossain Mahin	BFF Elite Academy	Free	16 August 2024	
27	DF	Joynal Abedin Dipu	Sheikh Jamal DC	Free	17 August 2024	
55	DF	Riyadul Hasan Rafi	Abahani Limited Dhaka	Free	17 August 2024	
39	MF	Rahim Uddin	Abahani Limited Dhaka	Free	17 August 2024	
3	DF	(Burkina Faso) Mounzir Coulidiati	(Thailand) Ubon Kruanapat	Free	18 August 2024	
12	FW	Jewel Rana	Rahmatganj MFS	Free	22 August 2024	
19	FW	Emtiyaz Raihan	Chittagong Abahani Limited	Free	22 August 2024	
25	DF	Apu Ahmed	PWD Sports Club	Free	22 August 2024	
44	GK	Md Ibrahim Hossain	Sheikh Russel KC	Free	22 August 2024	
39	FW	(Venezuela) Edward Morillo	Managua FC	Free	3 February 2025	

=== Out ===
No.	Pos	Player	Moved to	Fee	Date	Source
3	DF	Kamrul Islam	Abahani Limited Dhaka	Free	1 June 2024	
26	DF	Hasan Murad Tipu	Abahani Limited Dhaka	Free	1 June 2024	
11	FW	Jafar Iqbal	Abahani Limited Dhaka	Free	1 June 2024	
9	FW	Shahriar Emon	Abahani Limited Dhaka	Free	1 June 2024	
14	MF	Manik Hossain Molla	Bangladesh Police FC	Free	19 August 2024	
36	MF	(Uzbekistan) Bekhruz Sadilloev	Free agent	Released	19 August 2024	
6	MF	(Ivory Coast) Dosso Sidik	Free agent	Released	19 August 2024	
25	DF	Apu Ahmed	City Club	Free	1 March 2025	
44	GK	Md Ibrahim Hossain	Free agent	Released	1 March 2025	
17	FW	Emtiyaz Raihan	Free agent	Released	1 March 2025	
14	FW	(Ghana) Ernest Boateng	Free agent	Released	1 March 2025	

== Competitions ==
Win Draw Loss Fixtures

=== Overall ===
Competition	First match	Last match	Final Position
BPL	29 November 2024	27 May 2025	Champions
Federation Cup	10 December 2024	31 January 2025	Group stage
Challenge Cup	4 October 2024	4 October 2024	Runners-up

=== Overview ===
Competition	Record							
Competition	Pld	W	D	L	GF	GA	GD	Win %
BPL	18	13	3	2	46	16	+30	72.22
Federation Cup	4	2	0	2	11	4	+7	50.00
Challenge Cup	1	0	0	1	1	3	−2	0.00
Total	23	15	3	5	58	23	+35	65.22

Source: Competitions

=== Premier League ===
==== League table ====
Pos	Team	Pld	W	D	L	GF	GA	GD	Pts	Qualification or relegation
1	Mohammedan (Note: Mohammedan does not possess an AFC Challenge League licence.) (C)	18	13	3	2	46	16	+30	42	
2	Dhaka Abahani	18	10	5	3	31	8	+23	35	Qualification for the AFC Challenge League qualifying stage
3	Bashundhara Kings (W)	18	9	5	4	45	15	+30	32	Qualification for the AFC Challenge League qualifying stage (Note: as Federation Cup winners.)
4	Rahmatganj	18	9	3	6	39	25	+14	30	
5	Brothers Union	18	7	6	5	28	18	+10	27	

Source: Soccerway
Rules for classification: 1) Points; 2) Goal difference; 3) Goals scored.
(C) Champion; (W) Cup Winner

==== Results summary ====
Overall								Home						Away					
Pld	W	D	L	GF	GA	GD	Pts	W	D	L	GF	GA	GD	W	D	L	GF	GA	GD
18	13	3	2	46	16	+30	42	6	1	2	19	10	+9	7	2	0	27	6	+21

Source: Soccerway

==== Results by round ====
Round	1	2	3	4	5	6	7	8	9	10	11	12	13	14	15	16	17	18
Ground	A	H	H	A	H	A	A	A	H	H	A	A	H	A	H	H	H	A
Result	W	W	W	W	W	W	W	W	L	W	W	D	W	D	W	L	D	W
Position	2	1	1	1	1	1	1	1	1	1	1	1	1	1	1	1	1	1

Source: Matches
A = Away; H = Home; W = Win; D = Draw; L = Loss; P = Postponed

=== Matches ===
29 November 2024 1	Dhaka Wanderers	0–6	Mohammedan	Gazipur
14:30 BST (UTC+6)		Report	Sunday 5'; Minhajul 19'; Diabate 24', 89'; Topu (yellow card) 70'; Boateng 80'; Sourav 90+3'	Stadium: Shaheed Barkat Stadium; Referee: Md Alamgir

6 December 2024 2	Mohammedan	1–0	Bashundhara Kings	Cumilla
14:30 BST (UTC+6)	Minhajul (yellow card) 17'; Sujon (red card); Diabate 58'; Muzaffarov (yellow card) 88'; Shakib (yellow card) 90+5'	Report	Sadd (yellow card) 8'; Sohel (yellow card) 42'; Rimon (yellow card) 56'; Miguel (yellow card) 88'	Stadium: Shaheed Dhirendranath Datta Stadium; Referee: M Hassan

14 December 2024 3	Mohammedan	1–0	Dhaka Abahani	Cumilla
14:30 BST (UTC+6)	Diabate 45+2' (yellow card) 15'; Sunday (yellow card) 57'; Mahbub (yellow card) 90+1'	Report	Murad (yellow card) 45'; Papon (yellow card) 59'; Rabiul (yellow card) 90+7'	Stadium: Shaheed Dhirendranath Datta Stadium; Referee: Saymoon Hasan

20 December 2024 4	Bangladesh Police	1–3	Mohammedan	Mymensingh
14:30 BST (UTC+6)	Manik Molla (yellow card) 10'; Al-Amin 45+2' (yellow card) 56'; Joyonto (yellow card) 76'; Rabby (yellow card) 90+2'	Report	Rafi (yellow card) 17'; Emmanuel 31'; Sunday 40' (yellow card) 90'; Diabate 71'	Stadium: Rafiq Uddin Bhuiyan Stadium; Referee: Mohammed Nasiruddin

27 December 2024 5	Mohammedan	1–0	Fortis	Cumilla
14:30 BST (UTC+6)	Sunday 17'; Jewel (yellow card) 37'; Minhajul (yellow card) 41'; Mahbub (yellow card) 57'; Rafi (yellow card) 65'; Boateng (yellow card) 81'	Report		Stadium: Shaheed Dhirendranath Datta Stadium; Referee: Bituraj Barua

4 January 2025 6	Chittagong Abahani	1–5	Mohammedan	Mymensingh
16:45 BST (UTC+6)	Anik (yellow card) 13'; Shadhin (yellow card) 31'; Remon (yellow card) 43'; Fahim (yellow card) 57'; Jitu 90' (pen.)	Report	Topu (yellow card) 14' (yellow-red card) 22'; Coulidiati 47'; Sunday 55'; Sourav 63', 90'; Reza 85' (o.g.)	Stadium: Rafiq Uddin Bhuiyan Stadium; Referee: Nazmul Huda

10 January 2025 7	Rahmatganj MFS	1–3	Mohammedan	Munshigonj
14:45 BST (UTC+6)	Jibon (yellow card) 44'; Boateng 56'; Tanvir (yellow card) 87'	Report	Zisan (yellow card) 27' (goal) 45+1'; Muzaffarov (yellow card) 40'; Jewel (yellow card) 45'; Emmanuel (yellow card) 45+4'; Diabate 64'; Sunday 64'	Stadium: Shaheed Bir Sreshtho Flight Lieutenant Matiur Rahman Stadium; Referee: Md Saymoon Hasan Sany

17 January 2025 8	Brothers Union	0–1	Mohammedan	Munshiganj
14:30 BST (UTC+6)	Sazzad (yellow card) 26'; Sushanto (yellow card) 52'	Report	Sunday 12'; Emmanuel (yellow card) 50'; Muzaffarov (yellow card) 81'	Stadium: Munshiganj Stadium; Referee: Mahmud Zamal Farouqee Nahid

24 January 2025 9	Mohammedan	0–1	Fakirerpool YMC	Cumilla
14:45 BST (UTC+6)	Sunday (yellow card) 90+5'; Lal (yellow card) 90+11'	Report	Jakhonov 66'; Jintu (yellow card) 73'; Karimov (yellow card) 86'	Stadium: Shaheed Dhirendranath Datta Stadium; Referee: Anisur Rahman Sagor

21 February 2025 10	Mohammedan	3–0	Dhaka Wanderers	Cumilla
15:00 BST (UTC+6)	Muzaffarov 38'; Rahim 81'; Diabate 89'	Report	Imran (yellow card) 16'; Shakib (yellow card) 62'	Stadium: Shaheed Dhirendranath Datta Stadium; Referee: Mohammed Jalal Uddin

12 April 2025 11	Bashundhara Kings	1–2	Mohammedan	Dhaka
17:30 BST (UTC+6)	Rakib 25'; Rimon (yellow card) 15' (yellow-red card) 49'; Sohel (yellow card) 90'	Report	Arif (yellow card) 2'; Diabate 19', 86' (yellow card) 26'	Stadium: Bashundhara Kings Arena; Referee: Md Alamgir Sarker

26 April 2025 12	Dhaka Abahani	0–0	Mohammedan	Comilla
17:30 BST (UTC+6)	Ibrahim (yellow card) 51'; Emeka (yellow card) 79'	Report	Diabate (yellow card) 32'; Mahbub (red card) 42'; Mithu (yellow card) 53'	Stadium: Shaheed Dhirendranath Datta Stadium; Referee: Md. Symoon Hasan Sany

2 May 2025 13	Mohammedan	3–1	Bangladesh Police	Cumilla
15:45 BST (UTC+6)	Shanto (yellow card) 31'; Sunday 52', 90+4'; Muzaffarov (yellow card) 64' (goal) 88' (pen.)	Report	Manik (yellow card) 42'; Danilo 65' (pen.)	Stadium: Shaheed Dhirendranath Datta Stadium; Referee: Anisur Rahman Sagor

9 May 2025 14	Fortis	1–1	Mohammedan	Dhaka
16:00 BST (UTC+6)	Nova 23'	Report	Shakib (yellow card) 45+2'; Muzaffarov (yellow card) 45+5'; Mahbub 73'	Stadium: Bashundhara Kings Arena; Referee: Md Jalal Uddin

16 May 2025 15	Mohammedan	4–1	Chittagong Abahani	Cumilla
18:00 BST (UTC+6)	Diabate 29'; Muzaffarov 46'; Sunday 45', 60'	Report	Sumon 74'	Stadium: Shaheed Dhirendranath Datta Stadium; Referee: Sabuj Das

21 May 2025 (Note: Soccerway misreported: Samuel Boateng scored in the 84th and 86th minute for Rahmatganj MFS not Mamoud Oshie.) 16	Mohammadan	3–4	Rahmatganj MFS	Comilla
13:00 BST (UTC+6)	Diabate 2', 37'; Sunday 5'; Coulidiati (yellow card) 83'; Morillo (yellow card) 90+5'	Report	Boateng 10', 84', 86'; Taj Uddin 31'	Stadium: Shaheed Dhirendranath Datta Stadium; Referee: Anisur Rahman Sagor

23 May 2025 17	Mohammedan	3–3	Brothers Union	Comilla
17:30 BST (UTC+6)	Mithu 25'; Arif (yellow card) 35'; Diabate 38', 69'	Report	Becaye Diarra 7'; Darboe (yellow card) 18'; Mfon 71'; Jewel 87'	Stadium: Shaheed Dhirendranath Datta Stadium; Referee: Sabuj Das

27 May 2025 (Note: Soccerway misreported: Shanto Tudo scored in the 86th minute for Fakirerpool YMC not Rafayel Tudu.) 18	Fakirerpool YMC	1–6	Mohammedan	Gazipur
16:00 BST (UTC+6)	Tudo 86'	Report	Diabate 7', 23', 38', 71', 90'; Sourav 81'	Stadium: Shaheed Barkat Stadium; Referee: Bhubon Mohon Tarafder

=== Bangladesh Challenge Cup ===
Mohammedan SC, the Premier League and Federation Cup runners-up, faced Bashundhara Kings, the defending champions of both the Premier League and the Federation Cup, in the season opener.

18 December 2023 Final	Bashundhara Kings	3–1	Mohammedan	Dhaka
17:00 BST (UTC+6)	Sohel (yellow card) 45+2'; Topu 73'; Fahim 81'; Badsha (yellow card) 89'; Ejeh (yellow card) 90+1'; Miguel 90+7'	Report	Diabate 7'	Stadium: Bashundhara Kings Arena; Referee: Virendra Rai

=== Federation Cup ===
==== Group stages ====
Pos	Team	Pld	W	D	L	GF	GA	GD	Pts	Qualification
1	Dhaka Abahani	4	4	0	0	9	0	+9	12	Qualify for QRF 1
2	Rahmatganj MFS	4	3	0	1	10	2	+8	9	Advance to QRF 2
3	Mohammedan	4	2	0	2	11	4	+7	6	
4	Fakirerpool YMC	4	0	1	3	4	16	−12	1	
5	Chittagong Abahani	4	0	1	3	2	14	−12	1	

Source: Soccerway
Rules for classification: Group stages tiebreakers

===== Matches =====
10 December 2024 1	Mohammedan	0–1	Rahmatganj MFS	Dhaka
14:30 BST (UTC+6)	Sunday (yellow card) 72'; Shanto (red card) 85'	Report	Oshie (yellow card) 38'; Rajon 82'	Stadium: Bashundhara Kings Arena; Referee: Bituraj Barua

24 November 2024 2	Mohammedan	6–0	Chittagong Abahani	Dhaka
14:30 BST (UTC+6)	Muzaffarov 11'; Diabate 15'; Arif 53'; Zisan 69'; Sourav 78'; Jewel 81'	Report		Stadium: Bashundhara Kings Arena; Referee: MZF Nahid

7 January 2024 3	Dhaka Abahani	1–0	Mohammedan	Cumilla
14:30 BST (UTC+6)	Ibrahim 73'	Report	Muzaffarov (yellow card) 67'	Stadium: Shaheed Dhirendranath Datta Stadium; Referee: Bituraj Barua

31 January 2025 4	Fakirerpool YMC	2–5	Mohammedan	Mymensingh
14:30 BST (UTC+6)	Shanto (yellow card) 22'; Tudu 35'; Turaev 40' (pen.); Jintu (yellow card) 47' (yellow-red card) 68'; Karimov (yellow card) 71'	Report	Moin 10', 27'; Mithu (yellow card) 37'; Zisan 72'; Arif 81', 84'	Stadium: Rafiq Uddin Bhuiyan Stadium; Referee: Sabuj Kumar Das; Man of the Match: Moinul Islam Moin (Dhaka Mohammedan)

== Statistics ==
=== Squad statistics ===
No.	Pos	Nat	Player	Total		BPL		Federation Cup		Challenge Cup	
No.	Pos	Nat	Player	Apps	Goals	Apps	Goals	Apps	Goals	Apps	Goals
1	GK	(Bangladesh)	Sujon Hossain	17	0	13+1	0	2	0	1	0
22	GK	(Bangladesh)	Shakib Al Hasan	10	0	5+3	0	2	0	0	0
30	GK	(Bangladesh)	Md Alamgir Hossen	0	0	0	0	0	0	0	0
33	GK	(Bangladesh)	Md Ismail Hossain Mahin	1	0	0+1	0	0	0	0	0
40	GK	(Bangladesh)	Maksudur Rahman Mostak	0	0	0	0	0	0	0	0
2	DF	(Bangladesh)	Sazal Hasan Kalin	1	0	0	0	1	0	0	0
3	DF	(Burkina Faso)	Mounzir Coulidiati	8	1	2+4	1	2	0	0	0
4	DF	(Bangladesh)	Mehedi Hasan Mithu	18	1	14+1	1	2	0	1	0
5	DF	(Nigeria)	Emmanuel Tony	17	1	13+1	1	2	0	1	0
6	DF	(Bangladesh)	Jahid Hasan Shanto	16	0	14	0	2	0	0	0
26	DF	(Bangladesh)	Md Azizul Hoque Ananto	1	0	0+1	0	0	0	0	0
27	DF	(Bangladesh)	Joynal Abedin Dipu	9	0	3+3	0	1+1	0	1	0
28	DF	(Bangladesh)	Hafizur Rahman Babu	0	0	0	0	0	0	0	0
29	DF	(Bangladesh)	Shakil Ahad Topu	14	0	10+3	0	1	0	0	0
31	DF	(Bangladesh)	Mahbub Alam	17	1	14	1	2	0	0+1	0
32	DF	(Bangladesh)	Rajib Hossain	3	0	1+1	0	0+1	0	0	0
55	DF	(Bangladesh)	Riyadul Hasan Rafi	14	0	5+5	0	2+1	0	1	0
7	MF	(Bangladesh)	Minhajul Abedin Ballu	21	1	13+4	1	2+1	0	1	0
8	MF	(Bangladesh)	Sanowar Hossain Lal	9	0	0+7	0	0+2	0	0	0
15	MF	(Bangladesh)	Alamgir Kabir Rana	4	0	0+1	0	2+1	0	0	0
16	MF	(Bangladesh)	Md Jewel	11	1	6+2	0	0+2	1	0+1	0
17	MF	(Uzbekistan)	Muzaffar Muzaffarov	21	4	17	3	3	1	1	0
20	MF	(Bangladesh)	Moinul Islam Moin	8	2	3+2	0	1+2	2	0	0
21	MF	(Bangladesh)	Omar Faruk Babu	2	0	0+1	0	0+1	0	0	0
23	MF	(Bangladesh)	Rakibul Islam	1	0	1	0	0	0	0	0
24	MF	(Bangladesh)	Ashraful Haque Asif	14	0	6+6	0	1+1	0	0	0
9	FW	(Bangladesh)	Rahim Uddin	11	1	3+5	1	1+1	0	1	0
10	FW	(Mali)	Souleymane Diabate	19	21	16	19	2	1	1	1
11	FW	(Bangladesh)	Arif Hossain	21	3	12+4	0	4	3	1	0
18	FW	(Bangladesh)	Sourav Dewan	9	5	0+5	4	1+3	1	0	0
37	FW	(Nigeria)	Sunday Emmanuel	21	11	15+1	11	3+1	0	1	0
38	FW	(Bangladesh)	Raju Ahmed Zisan	16	3	6+6	1	2+1	2	0+1	0
39	FW	(Venezuela)	Edward Morillo	6	0	2+4	0	0	0	0	0
Players who left during the season
44	GK	(Bangladesh)	Md Ibrahim Hossain	0	0	0	0	0	0	0	0
25	DF	(Bangladesh)	Apu Ahmed	0	0	0	0	0	0	0	0
14	FW	(Ghana)	Ernest Boateng	7	1	4+1	1	1	0	0+1	0
17	FW	(Bangladesh)	Emtiyaz Raihan	0	0	0	0	0	0	0	0

Source: Soccerway

=== Goalscorers ===
Rank	No.	Pos.	Nat.	Player	BPL	Federation Cup	Challenge Cup	Total
1	10	FW	(Mali)	Souleymane Diabate	19	1	1	21
2	37	FW	(Nigeria)	Sunday Emmanuel	11	0	0	11
3	18	FW	(Bangladesh)	Sourav Dewan	4	1	0	5
4	17	MF	(Uzbekistan)	Muzaffar Muzaffarov	3	1	0	4
5	38	FW	(Bangladesh)	Raju Ahmed Zisan	1	2	0	3
5	11	FW	(Bangladesh)	Arif Hossain	0	3	0	3
7	20	MF	(Bangladesh)	Moinul Islam Moin	0	2	0	2
8	7	MF	(Bangladesh)	Minhajul Abedin Ballu	1	0	0	1
8	14	FW	(Ghana)	Ernest Boateng	1	0	0	1
8	5	DF	(Nigeria)	Emmanuel Tony Agbaji	1	0	0	1
8	16	MF	(Bangladesh)	Md Jewel Mia	0	1	0	1
8	3	DF	(Burkina Faso)	Mounzir Coulidiati	1	0	0	1
8	9	FW	(Bangladesh)	Rahim Uddin	1	0	0	1
8	31	DF	(Bangladesh)	Mahbub Alam	1	0	0	1
8	4	DF	(Bangladesh)	Mehedi Hasan Mithu	1	0	0	1
Own goal					1	0	0	1
Total					46	11	1	57

Source: Matches

=== Assists ===
Rank	No.	Pos.	Nat.	Player	BPL	Federation Cup	Challenge Cup	Total
1	17	MF	(Uzbekistan)	Muzaffar Muzaffarov	8	0	0	8
2	11	FW	(Bangladesh)	Arif Hossain	3	3	0	6
3	38	MF	(Bangladesh)	Raju Ahmed Zisan	2	2	0	4
4	37	FW	(Nigeria)	Sunday Emmanuel	1	1	1	3
4	18	FW	(Bangladesh)	Sourav Dewan	1	2	0	3
4	16	MF	(Bangladesh)	Md Jewel Mia	2	1	0	3
4	7	MF	(Bangladesh)	Minhajul Abedin Ballu	3	0	0	3
4	4	DF	(Bangladesh)	Mehedi Hasan Mithu	3	0	0	3
9	10	FW	(Ghana)	Ernest Boateng	2	0	0	2
9	39	FW	(Venezuela)	Edward Morillo	2	0	0	2
9	10	FW	(Mali)	Souleymane Diabate	2	0	0	2
12	9	FW	(Bangladesh)	Rahim Uddin	1	0	0	1
12	55	DF	(Bangladesh)	Riyadul Hasan Rafi	1	0	0	1
12	24	MF	(Bangladesh)	Ashraful Haque Asif	0	1	0	1
12	29	DF	(Bangladesh)	Shakil Ahad Topu	1	0	0	1
12	6	DF	(Bangladesh)	Jahid Hasan Shanto	1	0	0	1
Total					33	10	1	44

Source: Matches
