= Ankhbayar Sodmönkh =

Mongolian footballer (born 2002)

Ankhbayar Sodmönkh Анхбаярын Содмөнх
Personal information
- Date of birth: 7 August 2004 (age 22)
- Place of birth: Darkhan, Mongolia
- Height: 1.77 m (5 ft 10 in)
- Position: Midfielder

Team information
- Current team: Brera Ilch
- Number: 10

Senior career*
Years	Team	Apps	(Gls)
2018–2022	Khökh Chononuud		
2022–2023	Ulaanbaatar City		
2023–	Brera Ilch		

International career^{‡}
2019	Mongolia U17	4	(0)
2022	Mongolia U20	3	(1)
2023–	Mongolia U23	4	(0)
2023–	Mongolia	3	(0)
- * Club domestic league appearances and goals as of 12:42, 18 March 2024 (UTC) ‡ National team caps and goals as of 12:42, 18 March 2024 (UTC)

Ankhbayar Sodmönkh (Mongolian: Анхбаярын Содмөнх; born 7 August 2004) is a Mongolian footballer who plays as a midfielder for Mongolian Premier League club Brera Ilch and the Mongolian national team.

== Club career ==
Sodmönkh began his career with his hometown club Khökh Chononuud FC. He helped the club win the U19 league bronze medal in 2021 and was named the league's best midfielder following the season. During the 2021/2022 Mongolian First League season, he scored fourteen goals for Khökh Chononuud after being promoted to the senior squad. That year, the club finished the regular season second in the table with Sodmönkh winning the award for the league's best attacking player.

Following the season 2021/2022, Sodmönkh was one of seven members of the Blue Wolves squad who signed for Ulaanbaatar City FC of the Mongolia Premier League in winter 2022. After Ulaanbaatar City folded before the conclusion of the 2022/2023 season, he joined Brera Ilch FC during the summer 2023 transfer window.

== International career ==
Sodmönkh has represented Mongolia at the youth level, including in 2023 AFC U-20 Asian Cup qualification. In the tournament, Mongolia finished second behind only South Korea to earn its best-ever finish. In Mongolia's final match of qualification, Sodmönkh scored in a 6–0 victory over Sri Lanka.

Sodmönkh went on to make his senior international debut on 9 June 2023 in a Intercontinental Cup match against host India. After entering the match as a second-half substitute, his performance was identified as a bright spot by Mongolian media in the eventual 0–2 defeat.

== Career statistics ==
=== International ===
As of match played 15 June 2023

Mongolia
Year	Apps	Goals
2023	3	0
Total	3	0
