= Jahid Hasan Shanto =

Bangladeshi footballer

Personal information
- Full name: Mohamed Jahid Hasan Shanto
- Date of birth: 1 June 2003 (age 23)
- Place of birth: Cumilla, Bangladesh
- Height: 5 ft 10 in (1.79 m)
- Positions: Centre-back; right-back

Team information
- Current team: Mohammedan
- Number: 6

Senior career*
Years	Team	Apps	(Gls)
2018–2019	Tongi KC		
2019	Basabo TS		
2021–2022	Fakirerpool	14	(1)
2022–	Mohammedan	38	(0)

International career^{‡}
2023–2026	Bangladesh U23	11	(0)
- * Club domestic league appearances and goals as of 1 June 2026 ‡ National team caps and goals as of 7 June 2026

Jahid Hasan Shanto (Bengali: জাহিদ হাসান শান্ত; born 1 June 2003) is a Bangladeshi professional footballer who plays as a defender for Bangladesh Premier League club Mohammedan SC.

== Club career ==
=== Early career ===
Born in Comilla, Bangladesh, Shanto grew up in Narsingdi due to his father's job. He began playing football at Ripon Football Academy there. From there, he went on to play for the Second Division team Tongi Krira Chakra in the 2018–19 season in Dhaka, followed by a stint with the Senior Division team Basabo Tarun Sangha.

=== Fakirerpool YMC ===
Shanto began playing professionally with Fakirerpool YMC in the 2021–22 Championship League. On 10 March 2022, he made his debut for the club as a 84th-minute substitute for Dalim Barman during a 5–1 victory over Kawran Bazar PS. On 11 May 2022, he scored his first professional league goal against Agrani Bank SC, and also ended up scoring a stoppage time own goal in an eventual 2–3 defeat. In his inaugural professional season, Shanto made 14 appearances and scored once.

=== Mohammedan SC ===
In 2022, Shanto joined Premier League club Mohammedan SC, following his selection in the Bangladesh U20 team. On 21 November 2022, he debuted for Mohammedan as a substitute against Sheikh Russel KC during a 0–3 in the 2022–23 Independence Cup.

== International career ==
In 2022, Shanto was included as a reserve player in the Bangladesh U20 team for the 2023 AFC U-20 Asian Cup qualifiers and failed to make an appearance during their qualifying campaign. In 2023, he represented the Bangladesh U23 team and played in all three matches in the 2024 AFC U-23 Asian Cup qualifiers.

In February 2025, he was included in the 38-member preliminary Bangladesh national team squad for their 2027 AFC Asian Cup qualification – third round match against India. However, he was one of the eight players dropped from the squad prior to the first training session. In May 2025, Shanto was included in the final squad for a friendly match against Bhutan in preparation of their 2027 AFC Asian Cup qualification – third round match against Singapore.

== Career statistics ==
=== Club ===
As of 27 May 2025.

Appearances and goals by club, season and competition
Club	Season	League			Domestic Cup (Note: Appearance(s) in Federation Cup)		Other (Note: Appearance(s) in Independence Cup)		Continental		Total	
Club	Season	Division	Apps	Goals	Apps	Goals	Apps	Goals	Apps	Goals	Apps	Goals
Fakirerpool YMC	2021–22	Bangladesh Premier League	14	1	—		—		—		14	1
Mohammedan SC	2022–23	Bangladesh Premier League	2	0	3	0	1	0	—		6	0
Mohammedan SC	2023–24	Bangladesh Premier League	2	0	4	0	5	0	—		11	0
Mohammedan SC	2024–25	Bangladesh Premier League	14	0	2	0	—		—		16	0
Mohammedan SC	Mohammedan SC total		18	0	9	0	6	0	0	0	33	0
Career total			32	1	9	0	6	0	0	0	47	1

== Honours ==
Mohammedan SC

- Bangladesh Premier League: 2024–25
- Federation Cup: 2022–23
