= 2023 AFC U-20 Asian Cup qualification =

Tournament details
- Host countries: Saudi Arabia (Group A); Bahrain (Group B); Laos (Group C); Jordan (Group D); Mongolia (Group E); Indonesia (Group F); Oman (Group G); Kuwait (Group H); Tajikistan (Group I); Kyrgyzstan (Group J)
- Dates: 10 September – 18 October 2022
- Teams: 44 (from 1 confederation)

Tournament statistics
- Matches played: 76
- Goals scored: 319 (4.2 per match)
- Attendance: 110,782 (1,458 per match)
- Top scorer: (Japan) Kanta Chiba (9 goals)

The 2023 AFC U-20 Asian Cup qualification was an international men's under-20 football competition which was held to decide the participating teams of the 2023 AFC U-20 Asian Cup. It was held as under-20 tournament for the first time after rebranding by AFC.

== Format changes ==
The AFC Executive Committee had approved several strategic recommendations put forward by the AFC Competitions Committee. One of which was the removal of zoning principles in the AFC's youth competitions.

== Draw ==
Of the 47 AFC member associations, a total of 44 teams entered the competition. The final tournament hosts Uzbekistan decided to participate in qualification despite having automatically qualified for the final tournament. However. their matches will not be taken into account when calculating the group ranking and best second-placed teams among the groups. The draw was held on 24 May 2022.

The 44 teams were allocated to 4 groups of five teams and 6 groups of four teams, with teams seeded according to their performance in the 2018 AFC U-19 Championship final tournament and qualification (overall ranking shown in parentheses; NR stands for non-ranked teams). A further restriction was also applied, with the ten teams serving as qualification group hosts drawn into separate groups.

On 16 August, FIFA Council unanimously decided to suspend India with immediate effect due to undue influence from third parties, which constitutes a serious violation of the FIFA Statutes. On 27 August, FIFA lifted the suspension, allowing India to compete.

On 26 August, Australia withdrew from the tournament citing safety concerns due to the 2021–2022 Iraqi political crisis, leaving Group H with only three teams. Iraq were later removed as the hosts of the group due to the same reason, with the AFC deciding to move the fixtures to Kuwait and to be played from 14 to 18 October. Australia were reinstated into the group by the AFC on 14 September 2022.

	Pot 1	Pot 2	Pot 3	Pot 4	Pot 5
Host Pot	1. **Saudi Arabia** (1) **(H)**; 6. **Tajikistan** (6) **(H)**; 8. **Indonesia** (8) **(H)**; 10. **Jordan** (10) **(H)**	13. **Iraq** (14) **~~(H)~~**; 19. **Oman** (21) **(H)**; 20. Bahrain (22) **(H)**	27. Mongolia (30) **(H)**; 28. **Kyrgyzstan** (31) **(H)**	31. Laos (34) **(H)**	
Remaining Teams	2. **South Korea** (2); 3. **Qatar** (3); 4. **Japan** (4); 5. Thailand (5); 7. **Australia** (7); 9. United Arab Emirates (9)	11. **China** (11); 12. Malaysia (13); 14. **Vietnam** (15); 15. Chinese Taipei (16); 16. Cambodia (17); 17. **Iran** (19); 18. Yemen (20)	21. **Syria** (23); 22. Bangladesh (24); 23. India (25); 24. Myanmar (26); 25. Lebanon (27); 26. Hong Kong (29); 29. Philippines (32); 30. Palestine (33)	32. Turkmenistan (35); 33. Singapore (36); 34. Timor-Leste (37); 35. Maldives (38); 36. Brunei (39); 37. Sri Lanka (40); 38. Nepal (41)	39. Afghanistan (NR); 40. Bhutan (NR); 41. Guam (NR); 42. Kuwait (NR, **H***); 43. Northern Mariana Islands (NR); 44. **Uzbekistan** (18) **(Q)**

Notes

- Teams in **bold** qualified for the final tournament.
- (H): Qualification group hosts (* Kuwait replaced Iraq as group hosts after the draw)
- (Q): Final tournament hosts, automatically qualified regardless of qualification results

Did not enter
- Macau
- North Korea
- Pakistan (suspended)

== Player eligibility ==
Players born on or after 1 January 2003 are eligible to compete in the tournament.

== Format ==
In each group, teams played each other once at a centralised venue. The ten group winners and the five best runners-up qualified for the final tournament.

=== Tiebreakers ===
Teams were ranked according to points (3 points for a win, 1 point for a draw, 0 points for a loss), and if tied on points, the following tiebreaking criteria are applied, in the order given, to determine the rankings (Regulations Article 7.3):

1. Points in head-to-head matches among tied teams;
2. Goal difference in head-to-head matches among tied teams;
3. Goals scored in head-to-head matches among tied teams;
4. If more than two teams are tied, and after applying all head-to-head criteria above, a subset of teams are still tied, all head-to-head criteria above are reapplied exclusively to this subset of teams;
5. Goal difference in all group matches;
6. Goals scored in all group matches;
7. Penalty shoot-out if only two teams are tied and they met in the last round of the group;
8. Disciplinary points (yellow card = 1 point, red card as a result of two yellow cards = 3 points, direct red card = 3 points, yellow card followed by direct red card = 4 points);
9. Drawing of lots.

== Groups ==
The matches were played between 10 and 18 September 2022, with the exception of Group H which were played from 14 to 18 October.

=== Group A ===
- All matches were held in Saudi Arabia.
- Uzbekistan competed in the qualifiers, but their matches were not taken into account when calculating the group ranking.
- Times listed are UTC+3.

Pos	Team	Pld	W	D	L	GF	GA	GD	Pts	Qualification
1	Saudi Arabia (H)	3	3	0	0	17	0	+17	9	Final tournament
2	China	3	2	0	1	8	2	+6	6	Final tournament
3	Myanmar	3	1	0	2	4	8	−4	3	
4	Maldives	3	0	0	3	0	19	−19	0	

Source: AFC
Rules for classification: Qualification tiebreakers
(H) Hosts
10 September 2022
18:15

Uzbekistan	7–0	Maldives
Usmonov 10', 22', 57'; Rahmatullayev 12', 37'; Islamov 15'; A. Juraboyev 23'	Report

Prince Saud bin Jalawi Stadium, Khobar
Attendance: 10
Referee: Khaled Al-Shaqsi (Oman)
10 September 2022
21:30

Myanmar	1–3	China
Oakkar Naing 22'	Report	Asqer 13', 90+2' (pen.); Adil 90+5' (pen.)

Prince Saud bin Jalawi Stadium, Khobar
Attendance: 105
Referee: Kim Jong-hyeok (South Korea)

12 September 2022
18:15

Uzbekistan	3–0	Myanmar
Fomin 9'; Rahmatullayev 25' (pen.); A. Juraboyev 90+2'	Report

Prince Saud bin Jalawi Stadium, Khobar
Attendance: 20
Referee: Yousif Saeed Hassan (Iraq)
12 September 2022
21:30

Maldives	0–11	Saudi Arabia
	Report	Radif 3', 23', 37'; Al-Nemer 6', 45', 87' (pen.); Al-Elewai 22'; Al-Zubaidi 54'; Jawshan 57', 90+2'; Al-Rahmani 90+5'

Prince Saud bin Jalawi Stadium, Khobar
Attendance: 2,119
Referee: Yaasin Hanafiah (Malaysia)

14 September 2022
18:15

Saudi Arabia	1–2	Uzbekistan
Al-Nemer 85'	Report	M. Juraboyev 34'; Islamov 90+1' (pen.)

Prince Saud bin Jalawi Stadium, Khobar
Attendance: 2,299
Referee: Ahmed Al-Ali (Jordan)
14 September 2022
21:30

China	5–0	Maldives
Xuehret 23', 40'; Asqer 35'; Chen Zhexuan 61'; Mijit 87' (pen.)	Report

Prince Saud bin Jalawi Stadium, Khobar
Attendance: 55
Referee: Pranjal Banerjee (India)

16 September 2022
18:15

China	1–2	Uzbekistan
Adil 17'	Report	Oktamov 7'; Utamurodov 23'

Prince Mohamed bin Fahd Stadium, Dammam
Attendance: 130
Referee: Khaled Al-Shaqsi (Oman)
16 September 2022
21:30

Myanmar	0–5	Saudi Arabia
	Report	Radif 17', 45+5' (pen.); Al-Najdi 24'; Al-Oyayri 35'; Al-Juwayr 83'

Prince Saud bin Jalawi Stadium, Khobar
Attendance: 1,115
Referee: Yaasin Hanafiah (Malaysia)

18 September 2022
21:00

Maldives	0–3	Myanmar
	Report	Kaung Htet Paing 45+4'; Swan Htet 82'; La Min Htwe 86'

Prince Mohamed bin Fahd Stadium, Dammam
Attendance: 8
Referee: Ahmed Al-Ali (Jordan)
18 September 2022
21:00

Saudi Arabia	1–0	China
Bakor 45+5'	Report

Prince Saud bin Jalawi Stadium, Khobar
Attendance: 1,914
Referee: Kim Jong-hyeok (South Korea)

=== Group B ===
- All matches were held in Bahrain.
- Times listed are UTC+3.

Pos	Team	Pld	W	D	L	GF	GA	GD	Pts	Qualification
1	Qatar	4	4	0	0	14	1	+13	12	Final tournament
2	Bahrain (H)	4	2	1	1	8	3	+5	7	
3	Bangladesh	4	2	1	1	5	4	+1	7	
4	Bhutan	4	1	0	3	4	10	−6	3	
5	Nepal	4	0	0	4	1	14	−13	0	

Source: AFC
Rules for classification: Qualification tiebreakers
(H) Hosts
10 September 2022
18:00

Bhutan	2–0	Nepal
Chozang 33'; Jamtsho 47'	Report

Al Muharraq Stadium, Arad
Attendance: 50
Referee: Clifford Daypuyat (Philippines)
10 September 2022
21:00

Bangladesh	0–0	Bahrain
	Report

Al Muharraq Stadium, Arad
Attendance: 1,468
Referee: Thoriq Alkatiri (Indonesia)

12 September 2022
18:00

Bhutan	1–2	Bangladesh
Limbu 59'	Report	Nova 33'; Asif 88'

Al Muharraq Stadium, Arad
Attendance: 635
Referee: Yudai Yamamoto (Japan)
12 September 2022
21:00

Nepal	1–3	Qatar
Al-Sharshani 76' (o.g.)	Report	Mansour 30'; Surag 45+2'; Al-Abdulla 60'

Al Muharraq Stadium, Arad
Attendance: 100
Referee: Çarymyrat Kurbanow (Turkmenistan)

14 September 2022
18:00

Qatar	6–0	Bhutan
Al-Abdulla 26'; Jigmi 34' (o.g.); Al-Sharshani 39'; Shanan 45+4'; Al-Rawi 61', 78'	Report

Al Muharraq Stadium, Arad
Attendance: 0
Referee: Mohammad Arafah (Jordan)
14 September 2022
21:00

Bahrain	6–0	Nepal
Al-Khalasi 19' (pen.); S. Abdulla 37'; Gadban 67'; Al-Subaiei 84', 88'; Mu. Mohamed 90+1'	Report

Al Muharraq Stadium, Arad
Attendance: 250
Referee: Ahmed Eisa (United Arab Emirates)

16 September 2022
18:00

Bangladesh	0–3	Qatar
	Report	Al-Rawi 22', 60', 90+5' (pen.)

Al Muharraq Stadium, Arad
Attendance: 3,215
Referee: Clifford Daypuyat (Philippines)
16 September 2022
21:00

Bahrain	2–1	Bhutan
Mu. Mohamed 20' (pen.); Isa 60'	Report	Limbu 76'

Al Muharraq Stadium, Arad
Attendance: 205
Referee: Thoriq Alkatiri (Indonesia)

18 September 2022
18:00

Nepal	0–3	Bangladesh
	Report	Jony 6'; Nova 11'; Nijum 52'

Al Muharraq Stadium, Arad
Attendance: 1,019
Referee: Ahmed Eisa (United Arab Emirates)
18 September 2022
21:00

Qatar	2–0	Bahrain
Al-Sharshani 47'; Al-Hussein 52'	Report

Al Muharraq Stadium, Arad
Attendance: 200
Referee: Yudai Yamamoto (Japan)

=== Group C ===
- All matches were held in Laos.
- Times listed are UTC+7.

Pos	Team	Pld	W	D	L	GF	GA	GD	Pts	Qualification
1	Japan	4	4	0	0	22	0	+22	12	Final tournament
2	Yemen	4	2	1	1	14	5	+9	7	
3	Palestine	4	2	1	1	8	10	−2	7	
4	Laos (H)	4	1	0	3	4	7	−3	3	
5	Guam	4	0	0	4	1	27	−26	0	

Source: AFC
Rules for classification: Qualification tiebreakers
(H) Hosts
10 September 2022
16:00

Palestine	2–2	Yemen
Rezeq 4'; Abdallah 47'	Report	Mahross 56'; Mahdi 62'

New Laos National Stadium, Vientiane
Attendance: 1,652
Referee: Seyed Vahid Kazemi (Iran)
10 September 2022
19:00

Guam	0–3	Laos
	Report	Anantaza 31'; Chanthavixay 39'; Athit 88'

New Laos National Stadium, Vientiane
Attendance: 6,290
Referee: Chen Hsin-chuan (Chinese Taipei)

12 September 2022
16:00

Guam	0–5	Palestine
	Report	Buckwalter 11' (o.g.); Abu Al-Heija 14'; Al Badarin 28', 63'; Derbas 40'

New Laos National Stadium, Vientiane
Attendance: 895
Referee: Majed Al Shamrani (Saudi Arabia)
12 September 2022
19:00

Laos	0–4	Japan
	Report	Sakamoto 21'; Yamane 44'; Kitano 63'; Kumatoriya 69'

New Laos National Stadium, Vientiane
Attendance: 9,225
Referee: Virendha Rai (Bhutan)

14 September 2022
16:00

Japan	9–0	Guam
Nakamura 13', 35' (pen.); Narahara 15'; Chiba 30', 45', 56' (pen.), 86', 88', 90'	Report

New Laos National Stadium, Vientiane
Attendance: 230
Referee: Mahmood Al-Majarafi (Oman)
14 September 2022
19:00

Yemen	2–1	Laos
Mahdi 12'; Noman 83'	Report	Phetdavanh 85'

New Laos National Stadium, Vientiane
Attendance: 7,366
Referee: Nasrullo Kabirov (Tajikistan)

16 September 2022
16:00

Palestine	0–8	Japan
	Report	Kitano 26'; Fukui 28'; Sakamoto 45', 49' (pen.); Chiba 64', 75', 79'; Kumatoriya 69'

New Laos National Stadium, Vientiane
Attendance: 235
Referee: Majed Al Shamrani (Saudi Arabia)
16 September 2022
19:00

Yemen	10–1	Guam
Noman 18'; Al-Sharafi 23', 45+1', 53'; Hasan 43', 61'; Ebrahim 50'; Al-Taftoof 56', 86'; Al-Qashmi 90+1'	Report	Kukahiko 28'

New Laos National Stadium, Vientiane
Attendance: 143
Referee: Chen Hsin-chuan (Chinese Taipei)

18 September 2022
16:00

Japan	1–0	Yemen
Al-Dubai 85' (o.g.)	Report

New Laos National Stadium, Vientiane
Attendance: 918
Referee: Nasrullo Kabirov (Tajikistan)
18 September 2022
19:00

Laos	0–1	Palestine
	Report	Sandouqa 90+1'

New Laos National Stadium, Vientiane
Attendance: 7,319
Referee: Mahmood Al-Majarafi (Oman)

=== Group D ===
- All matches were held in Jordan.
- Times listed are UTC+3.

Pos	Team	Pld	W	D	L	GF	GA	GD	Pts	Qualification
1	Jordan (H)	4	3	1	0	21	2	+19	10	Final tournament
2	Syria	4	3	0	1	16	3	+13	9	Final tournament
3	Chinese Taipei	4	2	1	1	10	1	+9	7	
4	Turkmenistan	4	1	0	3	9	8	+1	3	
5	Northern Mariana Islands	4	0	0	4	0	42	−42	0	

Source: AFC
Rules for classification: Qualification tiebreakers
(H) Hosts
10 September 2022
16:30

Syria	1–0	Chinese Taipei
Al Aswad 28'	Report

Petra Stadium, Amman
Attendance: 97
Referee: Dayirbek Abdildaev (Kyrgyzstan)
10 September 2022
21:00

Northern Mariana Islands	0–7	Turkmenistan
	Report	Meredow 17', 19'; Mirzoýew 31', 86'; A. Saparow 45+1'; Durdyýew 76', 81'

Petra Stadium, Amman
Attendance: 14
Referee: Mohamed Javiz (Maldives)

12 September 2022
16:30

Northern Mariana Islands	0–10	Syria
	Report	Fadel 7', 35'; Safar 9', 26'; Osman 12', 75' (pen.); Nayef 40'; Al Ramadan 59'; Al Aswad 61'; Mhanna 70'

Petra Stadium, Amman
Attendance: 34
Referee: Abdullah Jamali (Kuwait)
12 September 2022
21:30

Turkmenistan	1–3	Jordan
A. Saparow 16'	Report	Abu Taha 54'; Dayeh 81'; Al-Shanaineh 90+3'

Petra Stadium, Amman
Attendance: 372
Referee: Mooud Bonyadifar (Iran)

14 September 2022
16:30

Chinese Taipei	1–0	Turkmenistan
Wei Chih-chuan 69'	Report

Petra Stadium, Amman
Attendance: 50
Referee: Yahya Al-Mulla (United Arab Emirates)
14 September 2022
21:00

Jordan	16–0	Northern Mariana Islands
Abu Taha 5', 22', 37'; Kalbouneh 13', 33'; Abu Hazeem 17' (pen.); Al-Shanaineh 19'; Darwish 23'; Amro 26', 84'; Dayeh 45'; Al-Sheyab 65', 77'; Al-Asad 81'; Abdul-Aziz 86'; Al-Mansouri 88'	Report

Petra Stadium, Amman
Attendance: 143
Referee: Baraa Aisha (Palestine)

16 September 2022
16:30

Chinese Taipei	9–0	Northern Mariana Islands
Kao Kuan-yu 4', 57', 59'; Lin 19'; Liu Hsuan-wei 29', 45+1', 74'; Yuan Yu-hsuan 42'; Liou Wei-zhe 85'	Report

Petra Stadium, Amman
Attendance: 18
Referee: Mohamed Javiz (Maldives)
16 September 2022
21:00

Syria	1–2	Jordan
Osman 51'	Report	Kalbouneh 12'; Abu Taha 56'

Petra Stadium, Amman
Attendance: 2,537
Referee: Mooud Bonyadifar (Iran)

18 September 2022
16:30

Turkmenistan	1–4	Syria
Meredow 90+2'	Report	Al Ramadan 56', 61'; Osman 78'; Fadel 88'

Petra Stadium, Amman
Attendance: 56
Referee: Yahya Al-Mulla (United Arab Emirates)
18 September 2022
21:00

Jordan	0–0	Chinese Taipei
	Report

Petra Stadium, Amman
Attendance: 875
Referee: Dayirbek Abdildaev (Kyrgyzstan)

=== Group E ===
- All matches were held in Mongolia.
- Times listed are UTC+8.

Pos	Team	Pld	W	D	L	GF	GA	GD	Pts	Qualification
1	South Korea	3	3	0	0	19	2	+17	9	Final tournament
2	Mongolia (H)	3	1	1	1	7	8	−1	4	
3	Malaysia	3	1	1	1	6	7	−1	4	
4	Sri Lanka	3	0	0	3	0	15	−15	0	

Source: AFC
Rules for classification: Qualification tiebreakers
(H) Hosts
14 September 2022
12:30

South Korea	6–0	Sri Lanka
Hussain 1' (o.g.); Lee Young-jun 26'; Lee Seung-won 45+2' (pen.); Lee Jun-sang 47', 69', 76'	Report

MFF Football Centre, Ulaanbaatar
Attendance: 177
Referee: Hiroki Kasahara (Japan)
14 September 2022
17:00

Malaysia	1–1	Mongolia
Aliff I. 54'	Report	B. Ganbat 24' (pen.)

MFF Football Centre, Ulaanbaatar
Attendance: 1,112
Referee: Feras Taweel (Syria)

16 September 2022
12:30

Mongolia	0–7	South Korea
	Report	Kim Hee-seung 10'; Bae Joon-ho 15'; Lee Young-jun 54', 90+3'; Kim Yong-hak 57' (pen.); Jung Seung-bae 61'; Lee Jun-sang 78'

MFF Football Centre, Ulaanbaatar
Attendance: 1,284
Referee: Casey Reibelt (Australia)
16 September 2022
17:00

Sri Lanka	0–3	Malaysia
	Report	Aliff I. 30', 90+4'; Adam 70'

MFF Football Centre, Ulaanbaatar
Attendance: 41
Referee: Adel Al-Naqbi (United Arab Emirates)

18 September 2022
12:30

South Korea	6–2	Malaysia
Lee Young-jun 34', 74', 82'; Bae Joon-ho 50'; Lee Seung-won 58', 88' (pen.)	Report	Adam 55'; Alif F. 69'

MFF Football Centre, Ulaanbaatar
Attendance: 142
Referee: Hasan Akrami (Iran)
18 September 2022
17:00

Mongolia	6–0	Sri Lanka
Zayat 2'; B. Ganbat 42'; Uuganbat 45+1', 90+1'; Sodmönkh 60'; Erdenebat 90+4'	Report

MFF Football Centre, Ulaanbaatar
Attendance: 1,236
Referee: Feras Taweel (Syria)

=== Group F ===
- All matches were held in Indonesia.
- Times listed are UTC+7.

Pos	Team	Pld	W	D	L	GF	GA	GD	Pts	Qualification
1	Indonesia (H)	3	3	0	0	12	3	+9	9	Final tournament
2	Vietnam	3	2	0	1	11	4	+7	6	Final tournament
3	Timor-Leste	3	1	0	2	2	9	−7	3	
4	Hong Kong	3	0	0	3	3	12	−9	0	

Source: AFC
Rules for classification: Qualification tiebreakers
(H) Hosts
14 September 2022
16:00

Vietnam	5–1	Hong Kong
Đinh Xuân Tiến 25', 51'; Nguyễn Quốc Việt 32' (pen.); Khuất Văn Khang 58'; Nguyễn Đức Anh 90+3'	Report	Tsang 68'

Gelora Bung Tomo Stadium, Surabaya
Attendance: 50
Referee: Oh Hyeon-jeong (South Korea)
14 September 2022
20:00

Indonesia	4–0	Timor-Leste
Hokky 12', 30', 49'; Rabbani 89'	Report

Gelora Bung Tomo Stadium, Surabaya
Attendance: 2,207
Referee: Jansen Foo (Singapore)

16 September 2022
16:00

Timor-Leste	0–4	Vietnam
	Report	Nguyễn Thanh Nhàn 10'; Bùi Vĩ Hào 15'; Nguyễn Xuân Bắc 83'; Khuất Văn Khang 85'

Gelora Bung Tomo Stadium, Surabaya
Attendance: 100
Referee: Omar Al-Yaqoubi (Oman)
16 September 2022
20:00

Hong Kong	1–5	Indonesia
Chen Ngo Hin 63'	Report	Rabbani 10'; Nico 15'; Zanadin 43'; Marselino 86', 90' (pen.)

Gelora Bung Tomo Stadium, Surabaya
Attendance: 2,839
Referee: Rustam Lutfullin (Uzbekistan)

18 September 2022
16:00

Hong Kong	1–2	Timor-Leste
Ichikawa 10'	Report	Juvito 52'; Ejivanio 60'

Gelora Bung Tomo Stadium, Surabaya
Attendance: 2,500
Referee: Jansen Foo (Singapore)
18 September 2022
20:00

Indonesia	3–2	Vietnam
Marselino 60'; Ferarri 82'; Rabbani 85'	Report	Ferarri 66' (o.g.); Đinh Xuân Tiến 79'

Gelora Bung Tomo Stadium, Surabaya
Attendance: 22,165
Referee: Omar Al-Yaqoubi (Oman)

=== Group G ===
- All matches were held in Oman.
- Times listed are UTC+4.

Pos	Team	Pld	W	D	L	GF	GA	GD	Pts	Qualification
1	Oman (H)	3	2	0	1	4	1	+3	6 (Note: Head-to-head points: Oman 3, Thailand 0)	Final tournament
2	Thailand	3	2	0	1	6	3	+3	6	
3	Philippines	3	1	0	2	3	6	−3	3	
4	Afghanistan	3	1	0	2	1	4	−3	3	

Source: AFC
Rules for classification: Qualification tiebreakers
(H) Hosts
Notes:
14 September 2022
17:00

Thailand	3–0	Afghanistan
Chonnapat 32'; Phuwanet 56'; Thanakrit 65'	Report

Al-Saada Sports Complex, Salalah
Attendance: 150
Referee: Faisal Al-Balawi (Saudi Arabia)
14 September 2022
20:45

Oman	3–0	Philippines
Al-Saqri 8'; Al-Salimi 13'; Al-Balushi 30'	Report

Al-Saada Sports Complex, Salalah
Attendance: 1,300
Referee: Nivon Robesh Gamini (Sri Lanka)

16 September 2022
17:00

Afghanistan	1–0	Oman
Rajabi 28'	Report

Al-Saada Sports Complex, Salalah
Attendance: 530
Referee: Ngô Duy Lân (Vietnam)
16 September 2022
20:45

Philippines	2–3	Thailand
Meriño 7'; Amirul 28'	Report	Thanakrit 11'; Phuwanet 44'; Peeranan 89'

Al-Saada Sports Complex, Salalah
Attendance: 297
Referee: Zaid Thamer (Iraq)

18 September 2022
17:00

Philippines	1–0	Afghanistan
Amirul 83'	Report

Al-Saada Sports Complex, Salalah
Attendance: 187
Referee: Chae Sang-hyeop (South Korea)
18 September 2022
20:45

Thailand	0–1	Oman
	Report	Al-Mashaikhi 21'

Al-Saada Sports Complex, Salalah
Attendance: 1,920
Referee: Nivon Robesh Gamini (Sri Lanka)

=== Group H ===
- All matches were originally scheduled to be held in Iraq, but were later moved to Kuwait due to the 2021–2022 Iraqi political crisis.
- Australia initially withdrew from the tournament citing safety reasons, but were reinstated when Iraq lost hosting rights.
- Times listed are UTC+3.

Pos	Team	Pld	W	D	L	GF	GA	GD	Pts	Qualification
1	Australia	3	3	0	0	9	2	+7	9	Final tournament
2	Iraq	3	2	0	1	6	3	+3	6	Final tournament
3	India	3	1	0	2	5	9	−4	3	
4	Kuwait (H)	3	0	0	3	2	8	−6	0	

Source: AFC
Rules for classification: Qualification tiebreakers
(H) Hosts
14 October 2022
16:30

Iraq	4–2	India
Qasim 2'; Abdulkareem 51'; Sadeq 63'; Yumnam 73' (o.g.)	Report	G. Singh 22'; Tongbram 33'

Ali Sabah Al-Salem Stadium, Al Farwaniyah
Attendance: 351
Referee: Tam Ping Wun (Hong Kong)
14 October 2022
19:30

Australia	4–1	Kuwait
Segecic 24' (pen.); Popovic 32' (pen.), 40'; Triantis 88'	Report	Saud 52' (pen.)

Ali Sabah Al-Salem Stadium, Al Farwaniyah
Attendance: 532
Referee: Nazmi Nasaruddin (Malaysia)

16 October 2022
16:30

India	1–4	Australia
G. Singh 62'	Report	Kuol 12'; Yumnam 32' (o.g.); Segecic 86'; Caputo 90+2'

Ali Sabah Al-Salem Stadium, Al Farwaniyah
Attendance: 88
Referee: Ali Reda (Lebanon)
16 October 2022
19:30

Kuwait	0–2	Iraq
	Report	Mousa 40'; Ali 90+4'

Ali Sabah Al-Salem Stadium, Al Farwaniyah
Attendance: 184
Referee: Akhrol Risquallev (Uzbekistan)

18 October 2022
16:30

Australia	1–0	Iraq
Popovic 59'	Report

Ali Sabah Al-Salem Stadium, Al Farwaniyah
Attendance: 67
Referee: Kim Woo-sung (South Korea)
18 October 2022
19:30

India	2–1	Kuwait
T. Singh 8'; G. Singh 77'	Report	Faisal 73'

Ali Sabah Al-Salem Stadium, Al Farwaniyah
Attendance: 376
Referee: Tam Ping Wun (Hong Kong)

=== Group I ===
- All matches were held in Tajikistan.
- Times listed are UTC+5.

Pos	Team	Pld	W	D	L	GF	GA	GD	Pts	Qualification
1	Tajikistan (H)	3	2	1	0	6	1	+5	7	Final tournament
2	Lebanon	3	2	0	1	7	5	+2	6	
3	Singapore	3	0	2	1	2	7	−5	2	
4	Cambodia	3	0	1	2	2	4	−2	1	

Source: AFC
Rules for classification: Qualification tiebreakers
(H) Hosts
14 September 2022
17:00

Cambodia	0–1	Lebanon
	Report	Sadek 9'

Pamir Stadium, Dushanbe
Attendance: 100
Referee: Sinan Hussain (Maldives)
14 September 2022
20:00

Tajikistan	0–0	Singapore
	Report

Pamir Stadium, Dushanbe
Attendance: 2,500
Referee: Songkran Bunmeekiart (Thailand)

16 September 2022
17:00

Singapore	1–1	Cambodia
Teo 28'	Report	Koeut Pich 44'

Pamir Stadium, Dushanbe
Attendance: 120
Referee: Bijan Heidari (Iran)
16 September 2022
20:00

Lebanon	0–4	Tajikistan
	Report	Karimov 14'; Olimzoda 44'; Khudoidodzoda 85', 90+1'

Pamir Stadium, Dushanbe
Attendance: 4,300
Referee: Choi Hyun-jai (South Korea)

18 September 2022
18:00

Lebanon	6–1	Singapore
Safwan 12', 22'; Kassas 30' (pen.), 59', 61'; Sadek 90+1'	Report	Amir 40'

Pamir Stadium, Dushanbe
Attendance: 90
Referee: Qasim Al-Hatmi (Oman)
18 September 2022
20:00

Tajikistan	2–1	Cambodia
Kamolov 59'; Nishonbojzoda 79'	Report	Hav Soknet 64'

Pamir Stadium, Dushanbe
Attendance: 5,000
Referee: Songkran Bunmeekiart (Thailand)

=== Group J ===
- All matches were held in Kyrgyzstan.
- Times listed are UTC+6.

Pos	Team	Pld	W	D	L	GF	GA	GD	Pts	Qualification
1	Iran	3	3	0	0	11	0	+11	9	Final tournament
2	Kyrgyzstan (H)	3	2	0	1	8	1	+7	6	Final tournament
3	United Arab Emirates	3	1	0	2	5	4	+1	3	
4	Brunei	3	0	0	3	0	19	−19	0	

Source: AFC
Rules for classification: Qualification tiebreakers
(H) Hosts
14 September 2022
16:00

United Arab Emirates	5–0	Brunei
Esam 1'; Khamis 62'; Abdulaziz 79' (pen.); Saeed 80'; Al-Jaari 90+3'	Report

Dolen Omurzakov Stadium, Bishkek
Attendance: 15
Referee: Ahmad Alaeddine (Lebanon)
14 September 2022
20:30

Iran	1–0	Kyrgyzstan
Hazbavi 70'	Report

Dolen Omurzakov Stadium, Bishkek
Attendance: 2,690
Referee: Mongkolchai Pechsri (Thailand)

16 September 2022
16:00

Brunei	0–8	Iran
	Report	Torabi 23'; Ebrahimzadeh 27', 67', 70', 71', 77'; Fakhrian 45+1'; Hajizadeh 56'

Dolen Omurzakov Stadium, Bishkek
Attendance: 0
Referee: Ammar Ashkanani (Kuwait)
16 September 2022
20:30

Kyrgyzstan	2–0	United Arab Emirates
M. Bekberdinov 20' (pen.); Brauzman 56'	Report

Dolen Omurzakov Stadium, Bishkek
Attendance: 1,562
Referee: Mohd Amirul Izwan Yaacob (Malaysia)

18 September 2022
16:00

United Arab Emirates	0–2	Iran
	Report	Saharkhizan 71'; Ebrahimzadeh 90+6'

Dolen Omurzakov Stadium, Bishkek
Attendance: 12
Referee: Sadullo Gulmurodi (Tajikistan)
18 September 2022
20:30

Kyrgyzstan	6–0	Brunei
M. Bekberdinov 16' (pen.), 45+3'; Almazbekov 25'; Sharshenbekov 45'; Kenjebaev 52' (pen.); Balbakov 90+5'	Report

Dolen Omurzakov Stadium, Bishkek
Attendance: 1,172
Referee: Mongkolchai Pechsri (Thailand)

== Ranking of second-placed teams ==
Due to groups having a different number of teams, the results against the fifth-placed teams in five-team groups were not counted in the ranking.

Pos	Grp	Team	Pld	W	D	L	GF	GA	GD	Pts	Qualification
1	F	Vietnam	3	2	0	1	11	4	+7	6	Final tournament
2	J	Kyrgyzstan	3	2	0	1	8	1	+7	6	Final tournament
3	A	China	3	2	0	1	8	2	+6	6	Final tournament
4	H	Iraq	3	2	0	1	6	3	+3	6 (Note: Disciplinary points: Iraq –5, Syria –8, Thailand –10.)	Final tournament
5	D	Syria	3	2	0	1	6	3	+3	6	Final tournament
6	G	Thailand	3	2	0	1	6	3	+3	6	
7	I	Lebanon	3	2	0	1	7	5	+2	6	
8	C	Yemen	3	1	1	1	4	4	0	4	
9	E	Mongolia	3	1	1	1	7	8	−1	4	
10	B	Bahrain	3	1	1	1	2	3	−1	4	

Source: Group stage
Rules for classification: 1) points; 2) goal difference; 3) goals scored; 4) disciplinary points; 5) drawing of lots.

== Qualified teams ==
A total of 16 teams including hosts Uzbekistan qualified for the final tournament.

Team	Qualified as	Qualified on	Previous appearances in AFC U-19 Championship^{1}
Uzbekistan	Hosts	26 January 2021	7 (2002, 2004, 2008, 2010, 2012, 2014, 2016)
Saudi Arabia	Group A winners	18 September 2022	14 (1973, 1977, 1978, 1985, **1986**, **1992**, 1998, 2002, 2006, 2008, 2010, 2012, 2016, **2018**)
Qatar	Group B winners	18 September 2022	14 (1980, 1986, 1988, 1990, 1992, 1994, 1996, 1998, 2002, 2004, 2012, **2014**, 2016, 2018)
Japan	Group C winners	18 September 2022	37 (1959, 1960, 1961, 1962, 1963, 1964, 1965, 1966, 1967, 1968, 1969, 1970, 1971, 1972, 1973, 1974, 1975, 1976, 1977, 1978, 1980, 1988, 1990, 1992, 1994, 1996, 1998, 2000, 2002, 2004, 2006, 2008, 2010, 2012, 2014, **2016**, 2018)
Jordan	Group D winners	18 September 2022	7 (1977, 1978, 2006, 2008, 2010, 2012, 2018)
South Korea	Group E winners	18 September 2022	38 (**1959**, **1960**, 1961, 1962, **1963**, 1964, 1965, 1966, 1967, 1968, 1969, 1970, 1971, 1972, 1973, 1974, 1976, 1977, **1978**, **1980**, **1982**, 1986, 1988, **1990**, 1992, 1994, **1996**, **1998**, 2000, **2002**, **2004**, 2006, 2008, 2010, **2012**, 2014, 2016, 2018)
Indonesia	Group F winners	18 September 2022	17 (1960, **1961**, 1962, 1967, 1969, 1970, 1971, 1972, 1975, 1976, 1978, 1986, 1990, 1994, 2004, 2014, 2018)
Oman	Group G winners	18 September 2022	2 (2000, 2014)
Australia	Group H winners	18 October 2022	7 (2006, 2008, 2010, 2012, 2014, 2016, 2018)
Tajikistan	Group I winners	18 September 2022	4 (2006, 2008, 2016, 2018)
Iran	Group J winners	18 September 2022	20 (1969, 1970, 1971, 1972, **1973**, **1974**, **1975**, **1976**, 1977, 1978, 1992, 1996, 2000, 2004, 2006, 2008, 2010, 2012, 2014, 2016)
Vietnam	Best runners-up	18 September 2022	19 (1961^{2}, 1962^{2}, 1963^{2}, 1964^{2}, 1965^{2}, 1967^{2}, 1968^{2}, 1969^{2}, 1970^{2}, 1971^{2}, 1974^{2}, 2002, 2004, 2006, 2010, 2012, 2014, 2016, 2018)
Kyrgyzstan	2nd best runners-up	18 September 2022	1 (2006)
China	3rd best runners-up	18 September 2022	18 (1975, 1976, 1978, 1982, **1985**, 1988, 1996, 1998, 2000, 2002, 2004, 2006, 2008, 2010, 2012, 2014, 2016, 2018)
Iraq	4th best runners-up	18 October 2022	17 (**1975**, 1976, **1977**, **1978**, 1982, **1988**, 1994, 1998, **2000**, 2004, 2006, 2008, 2010, 2012, 2014, 2016, 2018)
Syria	5th best runners-up	18 September 2022	10 (1975, 1988, 1990, **1994**, 1996, 2002, 2004, 2008, 2010, 2012)

^{1} Bold indicates champions for that year. Italic indicates hosts for that year.
^{2} As South Vietnam

== Goalscorers ==
There were 319 goals scored in 76 matches, for an average of 4.2 goals per match.

9 goals

- (Japan) Kanta Chiba

6 goals

- (Iran) Amir Ebrahimzadeh
- (South Korea) Lee Young-jun

5 goals

- (Jordan) Mohannad Abu Taha
- (Qatar) Ahmed Al-Rawi
- (Saudi Arabia) Abdullah Radif

4 goals

- (Saudi Arabia) Meshari Al-Nemer
- (South Korea) Lee Jun-sang
- (Syria) Hozan Osman

3 goals

- (Australia) Gabriel Popovic
- (China) Afrden Asqer
- (Chinese Taipei) Kao Kuan-yu
- (Chinese Taipei) Liu Hsuan-wei
- (India) Gurkirat Singh
- (Indonesia) Hokky Caraka
- (Indonesia) Marselino Ferdinan
- (Indonesia) Rabbani Tasnim
- (Japan) Isa Sakamoto
- (Jordan) Baker Kalbouneh
- (Kyrgyzstan) Mirlan Bekberdinov
- (Lebanon) Ali Kassas
- (Malaysia) Aliff Izwan
- (South Korea) Lee Seung-won
- (Syria) Muhannad Fadel
- (Syria) Zakaria Al Ramadan
- (Turkmenistan) Daýanç Meredow
- (Uzbekistan) Shahzodbek Rahmatullayev
- (Uzbekistan) Muhammadali Usmonov
- (Vietnam) Đinh Xuân Tiến
- (Yemen) Gassem Al-Sharafi

2 goals

- (Australia) Adrian Segecic
- (Bahrain) Mubarak Mohamed
- (Bahrain) Abdullah Al-Subaiei
- (Bangladesh) Piash Ahmed Nova
- (Bhutan) Santa Kumar Limbu
- (China) Abdulla Adil
- (China) Rehmetulla Xuehret
- (Japan) Sota Kitano
- (Japan) Issei Kumatoriya
- (Japan) Jiro Nakamura
- (Jordan) Zakaria Amro
- (Jordan) Alaa' Dayeh
- (Jordan) Amin Al-Shanaineh
- (Jordan) Sultan Al-Sheyab
- (Lebanon) Mohammad Sadek
- (Lebanon) Mohamad Safwan
- (Malaysia) Adam Farhan
- (Mongolia) Buyannemekh Ganbat
- (Mongolia) Temuulen Uuganbat
- (Palestine) Monir Al Badarin
- (Philippines) Kamil Amirul
- (Qatar) Rashid Al-Abdulla
- (Qatar) Jassem Al-Sharshani
- (Saudi Arabia) Yazeed Jawshan
- (South Korea) Bae Joon-ho
- (Syria) Mahmood Al Aswad
- (Syria) Elias Safar
- (Tajikistan) Abdulfatokhi Khudoidodzoda
- (Thailand) Thanakrit Laokrai
- (Thailand) Phuwanet Thongkhui
- (Turkmenistan) Söhbet Durdyýew
- (Turkmenistan) Suleýman Mirzoýew
- (Turkmenistan) Arslan Saparow
- (Uzbekistan) Asadbek Juraboyev
- (Uzbekistan) Rian Islamov
- (Vietnam) Khuất Văn Khang
- (Yemen) Mohammed Ali Hasan
- (Yemen) Mohammed Mahdi
- (Yemen) Ammar Noman
- (Yemen) Zakarya Al-Taftoof

1 goal

- (Afghanistan) Omid Rajabi
- (Australia) Max Caputo
- (Australia) Garang Kuol
- (Australia) Nectarios Triantis
- (Bahrain) Saad Abdulla
- (Bahrain) Abdulrahman Gadban
- (Bahrain) Salem Isa
- (Bahrain) Abdullah Al-Khalasi
- (Bangladesh) Ashraful Haque Asif
- (Bangladesh) Mojibur Rahman Jony
- (Bangladesh) Sajed Hasan Nijum
- (Bhutan) Sonam Chozang
- (Bhutan) Karma Jamtsho
- (Cambodia) Hav Soknet
- (Cambodia) Koeut Pich
- (China) Chen Zhexuan
- (China) Mawlet Mijit
- (Chinese Taipei) Benson Lin
- (Chinese Taipei) Liou Wei-zhe
- (Chinese Taipei) Wei Chih-chuan
- (Chinese Taipei) Yuan Yu-hsuan
- (Guam) Brandon Kukahiko
- (Hong Kong) Chen Ngo Hin
- (Hong Kong) Sohgo Ichikawa
- (Hong Kong) Ellison Tsang
- (India) Taison Singh
- (India) Maheson Singh Tongbram
- (Indonesia) Zanadin Fariz
- (Indonesia) Muhammad Ferarri
- (Indonesia) Alfriyanto Nico
- (Iran) Mojtaba Fakhrian
- (Iran) Hossein Hajizadeh
- (Iran) Amin Hazbavi
- (Iran) Saeid Saharkhizan
- (Iran) Mirmohammadreza Torabi
- (Iraq) Hayder Abdulkareem
- (Iraq) Ashar Ali
- (Iraq) Muslim Mousa
- (Iraq) Abdulrazzaq Qasim
- (Iraq) Ali Sadeq
- (Japan) Taichi Fukui
- (Japan) Yoshiki Narahara
- (Japan) Riku Yamane
- (Jordan) Mohammed Abdulaziz
- (Jordan) Mohammed Abu Hazeem
- (Jordan) Omar Al-Asad
- (Jordan) Seif Darwish
- (Jordan) Qusai Al-Mansouri
- (Kuwait) Saleh Faisal
- (Kuwait) Fahad Saud
- (Kyrgyzstan) Beknaz Almazbekov
- (Kyrgyzstan) Aytenir Balbakov
- (Kyrgyzstan) Khristiyan Brauzman
- (Kyrgyzstan) Ermek Kenjebaev
- (Kyrgyzstan) Arsen Sharshenbekov
- (Laos) Chanthavixay Khounthoumphone
- (Laos) Athit Louanglath
- (Laos) Anataza Siphongphan
- (Laos) Phetdavanh Somsanid
- (Malaysia) Alif Farhan
- (Mongolia) Ankhbayar Sodmönkh
- (Mongolia) Gan-Erdene Erdenebat
- (Mongolia) Temuulen Zayat
- (Myanmar) Kaung Htet Paing
- (Myanmar) La Min Htwe
- (Myanmar) Oakkar Naing
- (Myanmar) Swan Htet
- (Oman) Ali Al-Balushi
- (Oman) Ahad Al-Mashaikhi
- (Oman) Khalid Al-Salimi
- (Oman) Nasser Al-Saqri
- (Palestine) Bassam Abdallah
- (Palestine) Khaled Abu Al-Heija
- (Palestine) Danny Derbas
- (Palestine) Amro Rezeq
- (Palestine) Mohammed Sandouqa
- (Philippines) Martin Meriño
- (Qatar) Al-Hashmi Al-Hussein
- (Qatar) Mohammed Mansour
- (Qatar) Mobark Shanan
- (Qatar) Mohamed Surag
- (Saudi Arabia) Abdulaziz Al-Elewai
- (Saudi Arabia) Mohammed Bakor
- (Saudi Arabia) Musab Al-Juwayr
- (Saudi Arabia) Salem Al-Najdi
- (Saudi Arabia) Abdulmalik Al-Oyayri
- (Saudi Arabia) Saleh Al-Rahmani
- (Saudi Arabia) Yaseen Al-Zubaidi
- (Singapore) Amir Syafiz
- (Singapore) Kieran Teo
- (South Korea) Jung Seung-bae
- (South Korea) Kim Hee-seung
- (South Korea) Kim Yong-hak
- (Syria) Mahmoud Mhanna
- (Syria) Mahmoud Nayef
- (Tajikistan) Amadoni Kamolov
- (Tajikistan) Mekhrubon Karimov
- (Tajikistan) Bezhan Nishonbojzoda
- (Tajikistan) Fatkhullo Olimzoda
- (Thailand) Peeranan Buakai
- (Thailand) Chonnapat Buaphan
- (Timor-Leste) Ejivanio
- (Timor-Leste) Juvito
- (United Arab Emirates) Ali Abdulaziz
- (United Arab Emirates) Atiq Esam
- (United Arab Emirates) Mubarak Al-Jaari
- (United Arab Emirates) Khalifa Khamis
- (United Arab Emirates) Mayed Saeed
- (Uzbekistan) Rustambek Fomin
- (Uzbekistan) Makhmud Juraboyev
- (Uzbekistan) Akbar Oktamov
- (Uzbekistan) Javokhir Utamurodov
- (Vietnam) Bùi Vĩ Hào
- (Vietnam) Nguyễn Đức Anh
- (Vietnam) Nguyễn Quốc Việt
- (Vietnam) Nguyễn Thanh Nhàn
- (Vietnam) Nguyễn Xuân Bắc
- (Yemen) Mohammed Ebrahim
- (Yemen) Hamzah Mahross
- (Yemen) Mohammed Al-Qashmi

1 own goal

- (Bhutan) Kelzang Jigmi (against Qatar)
- (Guam) Levi Buckwalter (against Palestine)
- (Indonesia) Muhammad Ferarri (against Vietnam)
- (Qatar) Jassem Al-Sharshani (against Nepal)
- (Sri Lanka) Imdadulla Hussain (against South Korea)
- (Yemen) Gamil Al-Dubai (against Japan)

2 own goals

- (India) Bikash Yumnam (against Iraq and Australia)

== See also ==
- 2023 AFC U-20 Asian Cup
- 2023 AFC U-17 Asian Cup
- 2023 AFC U-17 Asian Cup qualification
