= Zakaria Amro =

Swedish-Jordanian footballer (born 2003)

Personal information
- Full name: Zakaria Waleed Mohammad Amro
- Date of birth: 26 June 2003 (age 23)
- Place of birth: Asarum, Sweden
- Height: 1.93 m (6 ft 4 in)
- Position: Centre-back

Team information
- Current team: Wright State Raiders
- Number: 3

Youth career
- –2019: Asarums
- 2019–2022: Mjällby

College career
| Years | Team | Apps | (Gls) |
| 2022–2024 | Charleston Cougars | 12 | (0) |
| 2024– | Wright State Raiders | 15 | (0) |

Senior career*
| Years | Team | Apps | (Gls) |
| 2024 | →Dayton Dutch Lions (loan) | | |
| 2025 | →Dayton Dutch Lions (loan) | 7 | (0) |

International career^{‡}
| 2022–2023 | Jordan U20 | 9 | (2) |
| 2025– | Jordan U23 | 3 | (0) |
- * Club domestic league appearances and goals as of 28 August 2025 ‡ National team caps and goals as of 28 August 2025

Zakaria Waleed Mohammad Amro (Arabic: زكريا وليد محمد عمرو; born 26 June 2003) is a footballer who plays as a centre-back for the Wright State Raiders. Born in Sweden, he represents Jordan at international level.

== Early life ==
Born in Asarum and raised in Sölvesborg, Sweden, Amro attended Furulundsskolan at high school. He played for Mjällby's U19 and U21 squad, before pursuing a university career in the United States.

== University career ==
Amro played two years of college soccer for the Charleston Cougars, as well as at Wright State Raiders.

During his freshman year in 2022, Amro played in 11 matches, earning 6 starts as a defender during his rookie season. He temporarily left the team early in the season to compete for the Jordan U20's in the U20 Asian Cup qualifying round.

As a sophomore in 2023, he only participated in one match against the Stony Brook Seawolves.

In August 2024, Amro transferred to the Wright State Raiders. As a junior, he appeared in 14 matches, all of them being starts for the team, and recorded an assist on 22 October against the Bellarmine Knights.

== International career ==
Born and raised in Sweden to Jordanian parents, Amro began his international career with the Jordan U20 team to participate in 2023 AFC U-20 Asian Cup qualification. He scored his first two international goals in a 16–0 win against the Northern Mariana Islands. He was named to the final roster of the 2023 AFC U-20 Asian Cup.

On 16 March 2025, Amro was called up to the Jordan under-23 team for the 2025 WAFF U-23 Championship held in Oman. On 24 August 2025, he was called up once again to participate in two friendlies against Bahrain, as well as to participate in 2026 AFC U-23 Asian Cup qualification matches.

== Playing style ==
Head coach of the Charleston Cougars Keith Wiggans described Amro as a "a big, strong talented center back," in addition to his "strong defensive abilities and his comfort on the ball" being able to help his team on both ends.
