= Chen Zhexuan =

Chinese footballer (born 2003)

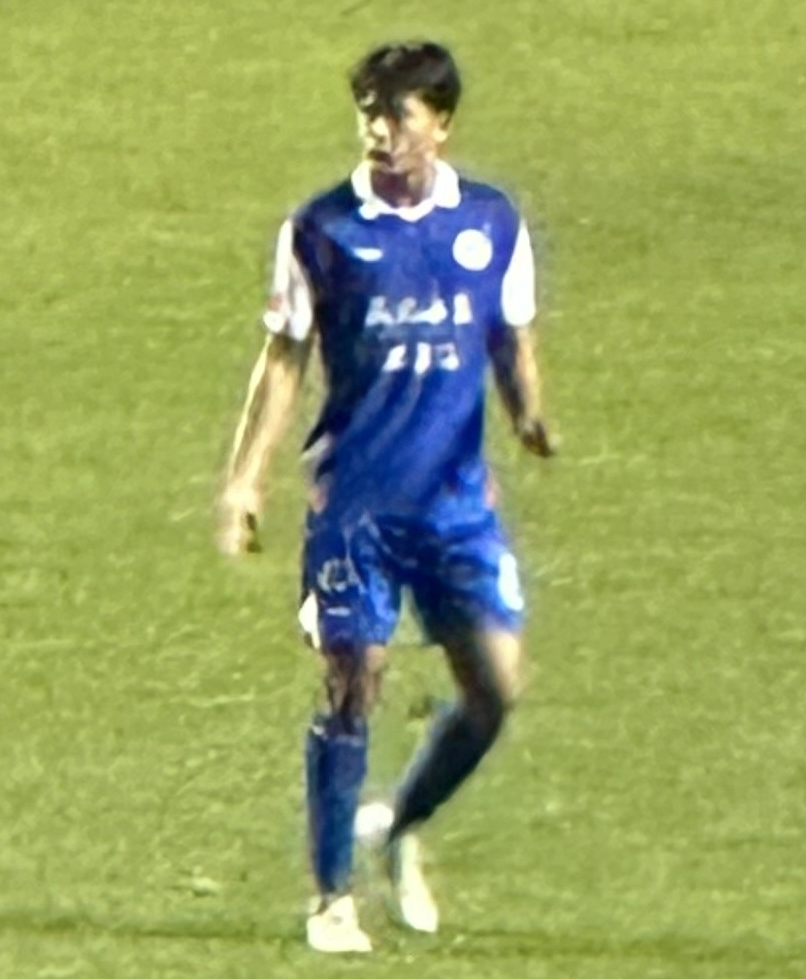
- Chen Zhexuan in May 2025

Personal information
- Full name: Chen Zhexuan
- Date of birth: 24 September 2003 (age 23)
- Place of birth: Changsha, Hunan, China
- Height: 1.80 m (5 ft 11 in)
- Position: Defensive midfielder

Team information
- Current team: Tianjin Jinmen Tiger
- Number: 24

Youth career
- 2011–2022: Shandong Taishan

Senior career*
Years	Team	Apps	(Gls)
2022–2024	Shandong Taishan	1	(0)
2024	→ Shijiazhuang Gongfu (loan)	20	(0)
2025	Shijiazhuang Gongfu	6	(0)
2025–	Tianjin Jinmen Tiger	23	(0)

International career^{‡}
2022–2023	China U20	6	(1)
2024–2025	China U23	10	(0)
- * Club domestic league appearances and goals as of 22 November 2026 ‡ National team caps and goals as of 22 November 2025

Chen Zhexuan (simplified Chinese: 陈哲宣; traditional Chinese: 陳哲宣; pinyin: Chén Zhéxuān; born 24 September 2003) is a Chinese professional footballer who plays as a defensive midfielder for Chinese Super League club Tianjin Jinmen Tiger.

== Early life ==
Chen Zhexuan was born in Changsha, Hunan, to father Chen Rui. Since July 2009, Chen had trained with Chinese former international footballer Wang Yan as his coach every day. She later recalled in an interview that she could tell that Chen was talented by the way Chen ran. Academically, Chen briefly attended Shuguang Primary School in Tianxin, Changsha. As a seven year-old, in October 2010, Chen went on trial at the youth academy of Shandong Luneng Taishan, travelling to the football school with two 2001-born upper-years from his native Changsha. He was ultimately selected by Shandong Luneng Taishan, and officially joined their academy a year later. Since he was the first 2003-born player to sign for the club, he has had to first join the 2001 youth team before the 2003 youth team could be established.

While at Shandong Luneng, Chen tried playing in various positions, before gaining foot in the defensive midfielder role. He later became the captain of his 2003 youth team, and garnered interest in the youth teams of the China national team, who regularly called him up. In 2019, he was sent by Shandong Luneng to train with Brazilian side and partner club Desportivo Brasil, to gain playing experience. In the latter half of 2019, Chen played in 26 matches in Brazil, and praised Brazil for the level of football there.

== Club career ==
=== 2022–2023 ===
In 2022, Chen Zhexuan was among the Shandong Taishan youth squad that played in the 2022 AFC Champions League group stage, as a way for Shandong Taishan to avoid quarantining their first-team players upon their return to China due to the COVID-19 pandemic. He made his debut for Shandong Taishan in a 7–0 defeat to Korean side Daegu. He started in five of their six group stage matches as Shandong Taishan were eliminated, finishing in last place. On 19 December 2022, he made his league debut for Shandong Taishan in an 8–0 win over Shenzhen, coming on as an 88th-minute substitute for Jin Jingdao, wearing the number 78. In November 2023, Chen guided Shandong Taishan U21 to the 2023 CFA U-21 League title, and gained promotion to the 2024 China League Two.

=== 2024–present ===
On 18 January 2024, Chen Zhexuan was sent on loan to China League One side Shijiazhuang Gongfu, claiming the number 24 shirt. He made his debut for the club on 17 March 2024, in a 3–1 away league defeat to Guangzhou. Throughout the 2024 season, Chen made 21 appearances across all competitions.

On 26 February 2025, Chen signed a permanent contract with Shijiazhuang Gongfu, and switched to the number 6. On 20 April 2025, he scored his first senior goal in a 2–0 away victory at Tai'an Tiankuang in the 2025 Chinese FA Cup.

On 16 July 2025, Chen made a move to Chinese Super League outfit Tianjin Jinmen Tiger. On 14 September, he made his debut for Tianjin Jinmen Tiger in a 4–0 home league win over Wuhan Three Towns, coming on as an 81st-minute substitute.

== International career ==
Chen Zhexuan was a regular in China's youth teams, having first been selected at the under-14 level in November 2017, after the youth national team scouts spotted him with Shandong Luneng U14 in a match against Japanese side Kashiwa Reysol.

On 15 September 2022, he scored a goal for China U20 in their 2023 AFC U-20 Asian Cup qualification match against the Maldives in a 5–0 victory.

In February 2023, Chen was selected as part of the China U20 squad for the 2023 AFC U-20 Asian Cup.

== Personal life ==
In addition to his native Chinese, Chen also considers himself conversational in Portuguese, having learned the language while he played in Brazil.

== Career statistics ==
=== Club ===
As of 1 November 2025

Appearances and goals by club, season, and competition
Club	Season	League			Cup		Continental		Other		Total	
Club	Season	Division	Apps	Goals	Apps	Goals	Apps	Goals	Apps	Goals	Apps	Goals
Shandong Taishan	2022	Chinese Super League	1	0	0	0	6 (Note: Appearances in AFC Champions League)	0	–		7	0
Shandong Taishan	2023	Chinese Super League	0	0	0	0	0	0	0 (Note: Appearances in Chinese FA Super Cup)	0	0	0
Shandong Taishan	Total		1	0	0	0	6	0	0	0	7	0
Shijiazhuang Gongfu (loan)	2024	China League One	20	0	1	0	–		–		21	0
Shijiazhuang Gongfu	2025	China League One	6	0	2	1	–		–		8	1
Tianjin Jinmen Tiger	2025	Chinese Super League	3	0	0	0	–		–		3	0
Career total			30	0	3	1	6	0	0	0	39	1
