= Kanta Chiba =

Japanese footballer

Kanta Chiba 千葉 寛汰
Personal information
- Full name: Kanta Chiba
- Date of birth: 17 June 2003 (age 23)
- Place of birth: Shizuoka, Shizuoka, Japan
- Height: 1.78 m (5 ft 10 in)
- Position: Forward

Team information
- Current team: Yokohama FC
- Number: 30

Youth career
- Takabe JFC
- –2021: Shimizu S-Pulse

Senior career*
Years	Team	Apps	(Gls)
2022–2026	Shimizu S-Pulse	30	(1)
2022	→ FC Imabari (loan)	22	(12)
2023	→ Tokushima Vortis (loan)	8	(0)
2023	→ FC Imabari (loan)	16	(7)
2024–2025	→ Fujieda MYFC (loan)	32	(4)
2026–	Yokohama FC	4	(2)

International career^{‡}
2019	Japan U16		
2020	Japan U18		
2021	Japan U20	4	(11)
- * Club domestic league appearances and goals as of 09:14, 19 October 2026 (UTC) ‡ National team caps and goals as of 16 September 2022

Kanta Chiba (千葉 寛汰, Chiba Kanta; born 17 June 2003) is a Japanese professional footballer who plays as a forward for J2 League club Yokohama FC.

== Career ==
=== Shimizu S-Pulse ===
Chiba was promoted to the first team in 2021. On 30 December 2023, his contract was renwed. Chiba made his league debut for Shimizu against Oita Trinita on 16 March 2024.

=== First loan at FC Imabari ===
Chiba made his debut for Imabari against Matsumoto Yamaga on 29 May 2022. He scored his first goal for the club on 12 June 2022, scoring in the 8th minute.

=== Loan to Tokushima ===
Chiba made his debut for Tokushima against Ventforet Kofu on 25 February 2023. He scored his first goal for the club in the Emperor's Cup against Iwaki on 7 June 2023, scoring in the 115th minute.

=== Second spell at FC Imabari ===
On 19 July 2023, Chiba joined Imabari on loan. In his second spell for Imabari, he made his debut on 22 July 2023. He scored his first goals against Tegevajaro Miyazaki on 29 July 2023, scoring in the 3rd and 4th minute.

=== Loan to Fujieda MYFC ===
On 3 July 2023, Chiba was announced at Fujieda MYFC. He made his league debut against Mito HollyHock on 6 July 2024.

=== Yokohama FC ===
In September 2026, Chiba transferred to J2 League club Yokohama FC.

== International career ==
On 14 September 2022, Chiba played for Japan U20 national team against Guam U20, where he scored a double hat-trick, in a 9–0 win, in the 2023 AFC U20 qualification in Laos.

== Career statistics ==
=== Club ===
As of 19 October 2026.

Appearances and goals by club, season and competition
Club	Season	League			National cup (Note: Includes Emperor's Cup)		League cup (Note: Includes J.League Cup)		Total	
Club	Season	Division	Apps	Goals	Apps	Goals	Apps	Goals	Apps	Goals
Shimizu S-Pulse	2022	J1 League	0	0	0	0	2	0	2	0
Shimizu S-Pulse	2024	J2 League	5	0	1	1	1	0	7	1
Shimizu S-Pulse	2025	J1 League	8	1	2	0	0	0	10	1
Shimizu S-Pulse	2026	J1 (100)	15	0	–		–		15	0
Shimizu S-Pulse	2026–27	J1 League	2	0	0	0	0	0	2	0
Shimizu S-Pulse	Total		30	1	3	1	3	0	36	2
FC Imabari (loan)	2022	J3 League	22	12	–		–		22	12
Tokushima Vortis (loan)	2023	J2 League	8	0	2	1	–		10	1
FC Imabari (loan)	2023	J3 League	16	7	–		–		16	7
Fujieda MYFC (loan)	2024	J2 League	15	2	0	0	0	0	15	2
Fujieda MYFC (loan)	2025	J2 League	17	2	0	0	0	0	17	2
Fujieda MYFC (loan)	Total		32	4	0	0	0	0	32	4
Yokohama FC	2026–27	J2 League	4	2	0	0	1	0	5	2
Career total			112	26	5	2	4	0	121	28
