= Santa Kumar Limbu =

Bhutanese footballer

Personal information
- Date of birth: 19 November 2004 (age 21)
- Place of birth: Samtse, Bhutan
- Position: Striker

Team information
- Current team: Ugyen Academy
- Number: 17

Senior career*
Years	Team	Apps	(Gls)
2022–	Ugyen Academy		

International career^{‡}
2022–	Bhutan U20	3	(2)
2023–	Bhutan	1	(0)
- * Club domestic league appearances and goals as of 20:50, 14 February 2023 (UTC) ‡ National team caps and goals as of 03:23, 29 March 2023 (UTC)

Santa Kumar Limbu is a Bhutanese professional footballer who currently plays for Bhutan Premier League club Ugyen Academy FC and the Bhutan national team.

== Club career ==
For the 2022 season Limbu played for Ugyen Academy FC of the Bhutan Premier League. Following the season, he received the Young Emerging Player Award from the Bhutan Football Federation. As part of the award he received a cash prize of Nu 30,000.

In January 2023 Ugyen Academy kicked off the new season with a 6–1 victory over Chukha Central School in the Bhutan Higher Secondary School Football Championship. Limbu scored three of his team's goals en route to earning Man-of-the-Match honours.

== International career ==
Limbu was called up to a Bhutan national team for the first time for the 2023 AFC U-20 Asian Cup qualification. He went on to score two goals in the tournament, the first against Bangladesh and the second against Bahrain.

In 2023 at age nineteen Limbu was called up to the senior national team for the first time for upcoming friendlies and the 2023 SAFF Championship. He made his senior debut on 28 March 2023 in friendly away to Nepal.

=== International statistics ===
As of match played 28 March 2023

Bhutan
Year	Apps	Goals
2023	1	0
Total	1	0

=== Youth international goals ===
Scores and results list Bhutan's goal tally first.

No.	Date	Venue	Opponent	Score	Result	Competition
1.	12 September 2022	Al Muharraq Stadium, Arad, Bahrain	Bangladesh	1–1	1–2	2023 AFC U-20 Asian Cup qualification
2.	16 September 2022	Al Muharraq Stadium, Arad, Bahrain	Bahrain	1–2	1–2	2023 AFC U-20 Asian Cup qualification
Last updated 14 February 2023
