= Jassem Al-Sharshani =

Qatari footballer (born 2003)

Jassem Al-Sharshani جاسم الشرشني
Personal information
- Full name: Jassem Mohammed Ali Al-Sharshani
- Date of birth: 2 January 2003 (age 23)
- Place of birth: Qatar
- Position: Midfielder

Team information
- Current team: Al Shahaniya
- Number: 90

Youth career
- Aspire Academy
- Al Ahli

Senior career*
Years	Team	Apps	(Gls)
2020–2026	Al Ahli	44	(0)
2026–	Al Shahaniya	0	(0)

International career^{‡}
2021–2022	Qatar U19	4	(0)
2023–	Qatar U20	4	(0)
- * Club domestic league appearances and goals as of 17 January 2026 ‡ National team caps and goals as of 12:32, 1 March 2023 (UTC)

Jassem Al-Sharshani (Arabic: جاسم الشرشني; born 2 January 2003) is a Qatari professional footballer who plays as a midfielder for Qatar Stars League side Al Shahaniya.

== Career ==
Al-Sharshani started his career at the youth team of Al Ahli and represented the club at every level.

== Career statistics ==
=== Club ===
As of 23 December 2020.

Club	Season	League			Cup		Continental		Other		Total	
Club	Season	Division	Apps	Goals	Apps	Goals	Apps	Goals	Apps	Goals	Apps	Goals
Al Ahli	2020–21	Pro League	2	0	1	0	0	0	—		3	0
Career totals			2	0	1	0	0	0	0	0	3	0
