= Mekhrubon Karimov =

Tajikistani footballer (born 2004)

Personal information
- Full name: Mehrubon Jormahmadovič Karimov
- Date of birth: 19 January 2004 (age 22)
- Place of birth: Tajikistan
- Height: 1.90 m (6 ft 3 in)
- Position: Defender

Team information
- Current team: Ravshan Kulob
- Number: 44

Youth career
- Lokomotiv-Pamir

Senior career*
Years	Team	Apps	(Gls)
2022	Dynamo Dushanbe		
2022–2023	Dinamo-Auto	13	(1)
2023–2025	Samgurali	28	(0)
2025–2026	Locomotive Tbilisi	17	(1)
2026–	Ravshan Kulob	9	(1)

International career^{‡}
2019	Tajikistan U16	1	(0)
2022–	Tajikistan U20	2	(1)
2022–	Tajikistan	10	(0)
- * Club domestic league appearances and goals as of 10 December 2025 ‡ National team caps and goals as of 5 June 2025

Mehrubon Jormahmadovič Karimov (Tajik: Мехрубон Каримов, Russian: Мехрубон Каримов; born 19 January 2004) is a Tajikistani professional footballer who plays as a defender for Tajik club Ravshan Kulob and the Tajikistan national team.

== Club career ==
On 18 July 2022, Dinamo-Auto Tiraspol announced their new signings for the season, which included Karimov. On 2 January 2023, Dinamo-Auto Tiraspol announced that Karimov had left the club after his contract was terminated by mutual consent.

Two months later, Erovnuli Liga club Samgurali announced the signing of Karimov on a three-year deal.

== International career ==
In March 2022, Karimov was called up to the Tajikistan national team for the first time, whilst a player for Dynamo Dushanbe, making his debut in the 92nd minute as a substitute for Alisher Dzhalilov in a 1–0 victory over Kyrgyzstan on 29 March 2022.

In May 2022, Karimov was called up to the Tajikistan training camp to be held in Dubai between 19 May and 3 June 2022.

== Career statistics ==
=== Club ===
As of match played 29 May 2025

Club	Season	League			National Cup		Continental		Other		Total	
Club	Season	Division	Apps	Goals	Apps	Goals	Apps	Goals	Apps	Goals	Apps	Goals
Dinamo-Auto	2022–23	Moldovan Super Liga	12	1	0	0	–		–		12	1
Samgurali	2023	Erovnuli Liga	8	0	1	0	–		–		9	0
Samgurali	2024	Erovnuli Liga	7	0	0	0	–		–		7	0
Samgurali	2025	Erovnuli Liga	12	0	0	0	–		–		12	0
Samgurali	Total		27	0	1	0	-	-	-	-	28	0
Career total			39	1	1	0	-	-	-	-	40	1

=== International ===
As of match played 14 June 2023

National team	Year	Apps	Goals
Tajikistan	2022	3	0
Tajikistan	2023	1	0
Total		4	0

=== International goals ===
Scores and results list Tajikistan's goal tally first.

#	Date	Venue	Opponent	Score	Result	Competition
1.	5 June 2026	TALCO Arena, Tursunzoda, Tajikistan	India	2–0	3–1	Friendly

== Honors ==
Tajikistan

- King's Cup: 2022
