= Sampa Tshering =

Bhutanese footballer

Personal information
- Full name: Sampa Tshering
- Date of birth: 26 May 1995 (age 31)
- Place of birth: Punakha, Bhutan
- Height: 1.76 m (5 ft 9 1/2 in)
- Position: Forward

Team information
- Current team: Druk Lhayul FC
- Number: 9

Youth career
- 2007–2008: Bhutan Football Federation

Senior career*
Years	Team	Apps	(Gls)
2014–2015	Ugyen Academy	17	(8)
2016–	Druk United	28	(26)

International career
2016–	Bhutan	1	(0)
- * Club domestic league appearances and goals

Sampa Tshering is a Bhutanese professional footballer. He made his official debut in their 2019 AFC Asian Cup qualifying match second leg against Bangladesh, coming on as a substitute in the 57th minute, replacing Dorji
