= Shakil Ahad Topu =

Bangladeshi footballer

Personal information
- Date of birth: 6 April 2006 (age 20)
- Place of birth: Bagerhat, Bangladesh
- Positions: Centre-back; right-back

Team information
- Current team: Mohammedan
- Number: 29

Youth career
- 2020–2024: BKSP

Senior career*
Years	Team	Apps	(Gls)
2022	Chittagong Abahani	1	(0)
2022–2023	Uttara	18	(1)
2023–	Mohammedan	18	(0)

International career^{‡}
2024	Bangladesh U20	8	(0)
2025–	Bangladesh U23	5	(0)
2024–	Bangladesh	11	(0)
Medal record
Men's football
Representing Bangladesh
SAFF U-20 Championship
Winner	2024 Nepal	Team
- * Club domestic league appearances and goals as of 27 May 2025 ‡ National team caps and goals as of 31 March 2026

Shakil Ahad Topu (Bengali: শাকিল আহাদ তপু; born 6 April 2006) is a Bangladeshi professional footballer who plays as a defender for Bangladesh Football League club Mohammedan and the Bangladesh national team.

== International career ==
Topu was part of the Bangladesh U20 team that won the 2024 SAFF U-20 Championship and also represented them at the 2025 AFC U-20 Asian Cup qualifiers.

On 13 November 2024, he made his debut for the Bangladesh national team in a friendly match against Maldives.

== Career statistics ==
=== International ===
As of 31 March 2026.

Bangladesh national team
Year	Apps	Goals
2024	2	0
2025	7	0
2026	2	0
Total	11	0
