= Khökh Chononuud FC =

Association football club in Mongolia

Khökh Chononuud
- Founded: 2019; 6 years ago
- Ground: MFF Football Centre
- Capacity: 5,000
- League: Mongolian First League

Khökh Chononuud Football Club (English: Blue Wolves) is a Mongolian association football club that currently competes in the Mongolian First League.

== History ==
Khökh Chononuud FC was founded in 2019. In its first season of existence, the team finished in fourth position in the Mongolia Second League. The club was runners-up in the 2021/22 Mongolian First League season. They went on to face Khovd FC in a promotion series. Ultimately the club fell 2–4 on aggregate and missed promotion to the Premier League.

== Domestic history ==
Key

Champion Runners-up 3rd place

Season	League							Domestic Cup	Notes
Season	Div.	Pos.	Pl.	W	D	L	P	Domestic Cup	Notes
2019	3rd	4th	8	4	1	3	13		
2020	2nd	9th	18	2	2	14	8		
2021	2nd	7th	9	2	2	5	8		
2021/22	2nd	2nd	18	12	4	2	40		
