= Lekeythang Football Field =

Football field in Punakha, Bhutan

- Location: Punakha
- Operator: Punakha Central School
- Capacity: 5,000

Lekeythang Football Field is the home pitch of the Punakha Central School's football team, located in the municipality of Punakha, Bhutan, just above the Punatsangchu and on the confluence of the Pho Chhu and Mo Chhu rivers. Its maximum seating capacity is 5,000 people. It is also the venue for the district's National Day celebrations and other functions.
