= Ashraful Haque Asif =

Bangladeshi footballer (born 2005)

Personal information
- Full name: Md Ashraful Haque Asif
- Date of birth: 5 June 2005 (age 21)
- Place of birth: Mymensingh, Bangladesh
- Position: Central midfielder

Team information
- Current team: City Club
- Number: 8

Youth career
- 2017–2021: BKSP

Senior career*
| Years | Team | Apps | (Gls) |
| 2017–2026 | Mohammedan | 49 | (1) |
| 2026– | City Club | 2 | (0) |

International career^{‡}
| 2022–2024 | Bangladesh U20 | 12 | (1) |
| 2025– | Bangladesh U23 | 1 | (0) |
- * Club domestic league appearances and goals as of 16 October 2026 ‡ National team caps and goals as of 21 August 2025

Ashraful Haque Asif (Bengali: আশরাফুল হক আসিফ; born 5 June 2005), is a Bangladeshi professional footballer who plays as a central midfielder for Bangladesh Premier League club City Club.

== Early life ==
Asif was born on 5 June 2005 in Ishwarganj, Mymensingh. He is the youngest son of Abu Taleb and Mumtaz Begum.

== Club career ==
A recruit from BKSP, Asif began his professional football career with Bangladesh Premier League club Mohammedan SC in 2017. He trained with the junior team, before making his Premier League debut against Sheikh Russel KC on 5 February 2022. He scored his first league goal during a 7–0 victory over Rahmatganj MFS on 2 August 2022.

== International career ==
Asif first represented the Bangladesh U20 team at the 2023 AFC U-20 Asian Cup qualifiers in Bahrain. In the tournament, he scored against Bhutan U20 in a 2–1 victory on 12 September 2022.

He was initially the vice-captain of Bangladesh U20 at the 2024 SAFF U-20 Championship in Nepal. However, following captain, Mehedi Hasan Srabon's injury in the semi-finals, Asif captained the team to a 4–1 victory over Nepal U20 in the final.

He was appointed captain of the team for the 2025 AFC U-20 Asian Cup qualifiers held in Vietnam.

== Personal life ==
Asif is a student at Dhaka University's Sociology department.

== Career statistics ==
=== International goals ===
==== Youth ====
Scores and results list Bangladesh's goal tally first.

| No. | Date | Venue | Opponent | Score | Result | Competition |
|---|---|---|---|---|---|---|
| 1. | 12 September 2022 | Al Muharraq Stadium, Arad, Bahrain | Bhutan | 2–1 | 2–1 | 2023 AFC U-20 Championship qualifiers |
Last updated 12 September 2022

== Honours ==
Mohammedan SC

- Bangladesh Premier League: 2024–25
- Federation Cup: 2022–23
