= Abdullah Omar Sajib =

Bangladeshi footballer (born 2002)

Personal information
- Full name: Mohammed Abdullah Omar Sajib
- Date of birth: 17 October 2002 (age 24)
- Place of birth: Patenga, Chittagong, Bangladesh
- Height: 1.73 m (5 ft 8 in)
- Position: Full-back

Team information
- Current team: Dhaka Abahani
- Number: 14

Senior career*
Years	Team	Apps	(Gls)
2020–2026	Fortis	85	(3)
2026–	Dhaka Abahani	4	(0)

International career^{‡}
2026	Bangladesh U23	3 (Note: Appearances as an overage player (three appearances in 2026 Diamond Jubilee International Football Tournament))	(0)
- * Club domestic league appearances and goals as of 23 October 2026 ‡ National team caps and goals as of 7 June 2026

Abdullah Omar Sajib (Bengali: আব্দুল্লাহ ওমর সজীব) is a Bangladeshi professional footballer who plays as a left-back for Bangladesh Football League club Dhaka Abahani.

== Early career ==
Sajib was born in Patenga, Chittagong on 17 October 2002. His father was a banker and died when he was young. His mother raised him and his three siblings. Sajib initially pursued football in Chittagong, where he started with Lucky Club and later played in the Chittagong Premier League with Customs before temporarily leaving football. He later took up a job at a garment factory and even attempted to move abroad in search of better employment opportunities. However, he eventually found his way back to football after being offered an opportunity to play for Kishwan SC in Chittagong.

== Club career ==
=== Fortis FC ===
Sajib joined Fortis in 2020, as the club made its debut in professional football in the 2020–21 Bangladesh Championship League. He started in the club's first professional match on 8 February 2021 against Farashganj. On 27 March, he scored his first goal for the club in a 5–0 victory over Victoria. On 19 June, he scored in a 2–1 victory over Dhaka Wanderers, followed by another goal against Kawran Bazar on 22 June, also in a 2–1 victory. He finished his debut season with three goals in 18 appearances. In the following season, he made 14 appearances as Fortis won the league title and secured promotion to the top tier.

He made his BFL debut on 10 February 2023 against Sheikh Russel, playing the entire match in a 1–0 defeat. Sajib departed the club after the 2025–26 season, having made 98 appearances and scored three goals across six seasons with the club.

=== Dhaka Abahani ===
Sajib joined Dhaka Abahani for the 2026–27 season.

== International career ==
Sajib received his first call-up to the Bangladesh national team in September 2025 for two international friendlies against Nepal in Kathmandu. He was added to Javier Cabrera's squad after defender Shakil Ahad Topu was ruled out through injury.

He was subsequently included in Bangladesh's preliminary squad for the 2027 AFC Asian Cup qualification matches against Hong Kong.

In May 2026, he was included in the Bangladesh U23 squad for the 2026 Diamond Jubilee International Football Tournament held in Malé. He made his debut for the team against Maldives.

== Career statistics ==
=== Club ===
As of 23 May 2026

Appearances and goals by club, season and competition
Club	Season	League			Domestic (Note: Appearance(s) in Federation Cup)		Continental		Other		Total	
Club	Season	Division	Apps	Goals	Apps	Goals	Apps	Goals	Apps	Goals	Apps	Goals
Fortis	2020–21	BCL	18	3	–		–		–		18	3
Fortis	2021–22	BCL	14	0	–		–		–		14	0
Fortis	2022–23	BFL	12	0	1	0	1 (Note: Appearance(s) in Independence Cup)	0	–		14	0
Fortis	2023–24	BFL	11	0	1	0	2	0	–		14	0
Fortis	2024–25	BFL	16	0	4	0	–		–		20	0
Fortis	2025–26	BFL	14	0	4	0	–		–		18	0
Fortis	Total		85	3	10	0	3	0	0	0	98	3
Dhaka Abahani	2026–27	BFL	0	0	0	0	–		–		0	0
Career total			85	3	10	0	3	0	0	0	98	3
