= 2025–26 Fortis FC season =

Fortis FC 2025–26 football season

Fortis FC
2025–26 season
- Owner: Fortis Group
- President: Md Shahin Hasan
- Head coach: Masud Parvez Kaisar
- Stadium: Bashundhara Kings Arena
- Bangladesh Football League: 3rd of 10
- Federation Cup: Group stage
- Top goalscorer: League: Pa Omar Babou (14 goals); All: Pa Omar Babou (15 goals)
- Biggest win: 7–1 v Fakirerpool YMC (Away); 8 May 2026 (Football League)
- Biggest defeat: 2–3 v Bashundhara Kings (Home); 14 March 2026 (Football League)

The 2025–26 season was the Fortis FC's 7th season since its establishment in 2020 and their 5th season in the Bangladesh Football League. In addition to domestic league, Fortis FC participated on this season's edition of Federation Cup. The season covered period was 1 June 2025 to 23 May 2026.

== Players ==
As of 15 August 2025

No.	Player	Nat.	Position(s)	Date Of Birth	Year Signed	Previous club
Goalkeepers
1	Sujan Perera	(Sri Lanka)	GK	18 July 1992 (aged 32)	2025	(Maldives) T.C. Sports Club
22	Md Omer Faruk Linkcon	(Bangladesh)	GK	25 January 1997 (aged 28)	2025	Arambagh KS
25	Md Mehedi Islam Rabbani	(Bangladesh)	GK	12 July 2007 (aged 17)	2025	Uttar Baridhara
30	Md Atick Hasan Sourov	(Bangladesh)	GK		2025	
Defenders
2	Abdullah Omar Sajib	(Bangladesh)	LB/RB	17 October 1994 (aged 30)	2020	Kishwan SC
3	Kamcai Marma Aky	(Bangladesh)	CB	12 July 2005 (aged 19)	2023	Fortis Academy
5	Monjurur Rahman Manik	(Bangladesh)	CB	5 September 1996 (aged 27)	2024	Sheikh Jamal DC
12	Noyon Mia	(Bangladesh)	RB	6 February 1999 (aged 26)	2023	Rahmatganj MFS
14	Md Mithu Chowdhury	(Bangladesh)	CB	11 October 2008 (aged 16)	2025	Brothers Union
23	Sani Das	(Bangladesh)	LB	3 March 2008 (aged 17)	2025	BFF Elite Academy
26	Md Mominur Fokir	(Bangladesh)	CB		2024	Fortis Academy
28	Md Rasel Hossain	(Bangladesh)	RB		2025	
44	Ananta Tamang	(Nepal)	CB	14 January 1998 (aged 27)	2025	(Nepal) Tribhuvan Army
Midfielders
4	Essa Jallow	(The Gambia)	DM	14 August 2000 (aged 24)	2024	(The Gambia) Real de Banjul FC
6	Md Farhad Mona	(Bangladesh)	DM	24 June 2002 (aged 22)	2023	Chittagong Abahani
8	Mamunul Islam	(Bangladesh)	CM	12 December 1988 (aged 36)	2022	Rahmatganj MFS
13	Atiqur Rahman Fahad	(Bangladesh)	DM/CM	15 September 1995 (aged 29)	2024	Sheikh Jamal DC
15	Md Emon Babu Jibon	(Bangladesh)	DM	6 February 2008 (aged 17)	2025	Little Friends Club
18	Sajed Hasan Jummon Nijum	(Bangladesh)	AM/RM	5 January 2004 (aged 21)	2023	BFF Elite Academy
27	Joy Kumar	(Bangladesh)	AM/CM	11 October 2003 (aged 21)	2024	Uttara FC
29	Md Shofiq Rahman Tihim	(Bangladesh)	DM/CM	12 October 2008 (aged 16)	2025	Little Friends Club
Forwards
7	Borhan Uddin	(Bangladesh)	RW	1 May 2001 (aged 24)	2020	Tongi Krira Chakra
9	Sazzad Hossain	(Bangladesh)	RW/CF	18 January 1995 (aged 30)	2025	Brothers Union
10	Pa Omar Babou	(The Gambia)	LW	1 October 1998 (aged 26)	2023	(Morocco) SCC Mohammédia
11	Shakhawat Hossain Rony	(Bangladesh)	CF	8 October 1991 (aged 33)	2022	Chittagong Abahani
16	Murshed Ali	(Bangladesh)	RW/LW	20 December 2008 (aged 16)	2025	BFF Elite Academy
17	Piash Ahmed Nova	(Bangladesh)	CF	25 September 2005 (aged 19)	2024	Sheikh Jamal DC
19	Onyekachi Okafor	(Nigeria)	CF	2 June 1994 (aged 30)	2025	(Nigeria) Lobi Stars
20	Sakib Bepari	(Bangladesh)	CF	21 January 2003 (aged 22)	2025	Dhaka Wanderers
21	Riaj Uddin Sagor	(Bangladesh)	LW	5 April 2002 (aged 23)	2024	Chittagong Abahani
24	Md Ariful Islam Shanto	(Bangladesh)	CF/LW/RW	14 February 1997 (aged 28)	2025	Brothers Union

== Transfer ==
=== In ===
No.	Position	Player	From	Fee	Date	Source
1	GK	(Sri Lanka) Sujan Perera	(Maldives) TC Sports Club	Free Transfer	9 July 2025	
14	DF	Rasel Hossain	Unknown	Free Transfer	10 July 2025	
25	GK	Mehedi Islam Rabbani	Uttar Baridhara SC	Free Transfer	12 July 2025	
23	DF	Sani Das	BFF Elite Academy	Free Transfer	15 July 2025	
15	MF	Md Emon Babu Jibon	Little Friends Club	Free Transfer	30 July 2025	
9	FW	(Nigeria) Onyekachi Okafor	(Nigeria) Lobi Stars	Free Transfer	7 August 2025	
9	FW	Sazzad Hossain	Brothers Union	Free Transfer	9 August 2025	
14	DF	Mithu Choudhury	Brothers Union	Free Transfer	10 August 2025	
44	MF	(Nepal) Ananta Tamang	(Nepal) Tribhuvan Army	Free Transfer	14 August 2025	
29	MF	Md Shofiq Rahman Tihim	Little Friends Club	Free Transfer	14 August 2025	
22	GK	Md Omer Faruk Linkcon	Arambagh KS	Free Transfer	14 August 2025	
20	FW	Sakib Bepari	Dhaka Wanderers Club	Free Transfer	14 August 2025	
24	FW	Md Ariful Islam Shanto	Unknown	Free Transfer	14 August 2025	
17	DF	(Bhutan) Dawa Kuenjung Tshering	(Bhutan) Thimphu City FC	Loan Transfer	22 January 2026	

=== Out ===
No.	Position	Player	From	Fee	Date	Source
5	DF	(Uzbekistan) Jasur Jumaev	Free agent	Released	1 July 2025	
45	FW	(Nigeria) Ojukwu David Ifegwu	Free agent	Released	1 July 2025	
17	FW	(Ukraine) Valeriy Hryshyn	(Indonesia) Madura United F.C.	Free Transfer	1 July 2025	
9	FW	(The Gambia) Omar Sarr	Free agent	Released	1 July 2025	
77	MF	Biplu Ahmed	Arambagh KS	Free Transfer	1 July 2025	
32	LB	Shakil Ahmed	Arambagh KS	Free Transfer	25 July 2025	
33	MF	Mohammad Abdullah	PWD Sports Club	Free Transfer	10 August 2025	

== Friendlies ==
=== Pre-season ===
24 August 2025	Bangladesh	4–0	Fortis	Dhaka
18:00 BST (UTC+6)	Bhuyan; Ali; Ibrahim; Reza	Report		Stadium: National Stadium; Referee: Bituraj Barua

9 September 2025	Bashundhara Kings	3–1	Fortis	Dhaka
18:00 BST (UTC+6)	Dorielton; Jahid	Report	Omar Babou	Stadium: Bashundhara Kings Arena

== Competitions ==
Win Draw Loss Fixtures

=== Overall ===
Competition	First match	Last match	Final Position
BFL	27 September 2025	23 May 2026	3rd of 10
Federation Cup	23 September 2025	7 April 2026	Group stage

=== Overview ===
Competition	Record							
Competition	Pld	W	D	L	GF	GA	GD	Win %
BFL	18	10	5	3	31	12	+19	55.56
Federation Cup	4	1	2	1	3	8	−5	25.00
Total	22	11	7	4	34	20	+14	50.00

Source: Competitions

=== Premier League ===
==== League table ====
Pos	Team	Pld	W	D	L	GF	GA	GD	Pts	Qualification or relegation
1	Bashundhara Kings (Note: Bashundhara Kings and Dhaka Abahani will not be able to participate in the AFC Challenge League due to the risk of FIFA sanctions and the lack of an AFC club license.) (C)	18	12	5	1	42	18	+24	41	
2	Dhaka Abahani	18	11	4	3	37	15	+22	37	
3	Fortis	18	10	5	3	31	13	+18	35	Qualification for the AFC; Challenge League qualifying stage
4	Bangladesh Police	18	6	9	3	19	15	+4	27	Qualification for the AFC; Challenge League qualifying stage
5	Mohammedan	18	6	5	7	27	20	+7	23	

Source: Soccerway
Rules for classification: 1) Points; 2) Goal difference; 3) Number of goals scored.
(C) Champion

==== Results summary ====
Overall								Home						Away					
Pld	W	D	L	GF	GA	GD	Pts	W	D	L	GF	GA	GD	W	D	L	GF	GA	GD
18	10	5	3	31	13	+18	35	5	3	1	14	5	+9	5	2	2	17	8	+9

Source: Soccerway

==== Results by round ====
Round	1	2	3	4	5	6	7	8	9	10	11	12	13	14	15	16	17	18
Ground	H	A	H	A	H	A	H	A	H	A	H	A	H	A	H	A	H	A
Result	W	L	D	W	D	W	W	D	W	W	L	W	D	L	W	W	W	D
Position	1	5	5	2	3	2	2	2	2	2	2	2	3	3	3	3	3	3

Source: Matches
A = Away; H = Home; W = Win; D = Draw; L = Loss; P = Postponed

==== Matches ====
27 September 2025 1	Fortis FC	2–0	Mohammedan SC	Dhaka
14:45 BST (UTC+6)	Noyon (yellow card) 45'; Babou 61', 79'; Fahad (yellow card) 52'	Report	Raju (yellow card) 33'; Keke (yellow card) 34'	Stadium: Bashundhara Kings Arena; Referee: Mahmud Zameel Farooque Nahid

20 October 2025	Bashundhara Kings	2–1	Fortis FC	Dhaka
17:30 BST (UTC+6)	Dorielton 2'; Fahim 60'; Srabon (yellow card) 66'	Report	Mona (yellow card) 57'; Babou (yellow card) 90+4'; Okafor 90+5'	Stadium: Bashundhara Kings Arena; Referee: Bhubon Mohon Tarafder

24 November 2025 3	Fortis FC	0–0	Bangladesh Police FC	Dhaka
14:45 BST (UTC+6)		Report	Foday Darboe (yellow card) 67'	Stadium: Bashundhara Kings Arena; Referee: Mahmud Zamal Farouqee Nahid

28 November 2025 4	Arambagh KS	0–1	Fortis FC	Manikganj
14:30 BST (UTC+6)	Shakil (yellow card) 27'; Md Rokey (yellow card) 42'	Report	Riaj Uddin Sagor 16'; Sajed Hasan Jummon Nijum (yellow card) 43'; Sani Das (yellow card) 64'; Fahad (red card) 74'	Stadium: Shaheed Miraj–Tapan Stadium; Referee: Golam Mushed Chowdhury Nayon

6 December 2025 5	Fortis FC	0–0	Dhaka Abahani	Dhaka
14:30 BST (UTC+6)		Report	Gazi (yellow card) 4'	Stadium: Bashundhara Kings Arena; Referee: Mohammed Alamgir Sarker

12 December 2025 6	Rahmatganj MFS	0–1	Fortis FC	Munshiganj
14:30 BST (UTC+6)	Istekharul Alam Shakil (yellow card) 27'; Md Sayde (yellow card) 49'	Report	Okafor (yellow card) 27' (goal) 90+3'; Sani Das (yellow card) 43'; Mohammad Farhad Mona (yellow card) 84'	Stadium: Shaheed Bir Sreshtho Flight Lieutenant Matiur Rahman Stadium; Referee: Mahmud Zamal Farouqee Nahid

20 December 2025 7	Fortis FC	3–0	Fakirerpool YMC	Dhaka
14:30 BST (UTC+6)	Babou 8', 54'; Riaj Uddin Sagor 19'; Rony (yellow card) 36'	Report		Stadium: Bashundhara Kings Arena; Referee: Md Junayed Sharif

27 December 2025 8	Brothers Union	1–1	Fortis FC	Munshiganj
14:30 BST (UTC+6)	Moltazim Alam Himel 21'; Bista (yellow card) 23'; Kaushik Barua (yellow card) 90+7'	Report	Essa Jallow (yellow card) 45+1'; Babou 64'; Abdullah Omar Sajib (yellow card) 90+7'	Stadium: Shaheed Bir Sreshtho Flight Lieutenant Matiur Rahman Stadium; Referee: Sabuj Das

3 January 2026 9	Fortis FC	2–0	PWD Sports Club	Dhaka
14:30 BST (UTC+6)	Babou 48'; Okafor 90+1'	Report	Anthony Amoh (yellow card) 29'	Stadium: Bashundhara Kings Arena; Referee: Md Alamgir Sarker

7 March 2026 10	Mohammedan SC	1–2	Fortis FC	Cumilla
14:45 BST (UTC+6)	Jahid Hasan Shanto (yellow card) 50'; Muzaffarov 64' (pen.); Asif (yellow card) 90+5'	Report	Essa Jallow 19', 51' (yellow card) 90+6'; Okafor (yellow card) 24'; Sajed Hasan Jummon Nijum (red card) 66'	Stadium: Shaheed Dhirendranath Datta Stadium; Referee: Md Nasir Uddin

14 March 2026 11	Fortis FC	2–3	Bashundhara Kings	Dhaka
14:45 BST (UTC+6)	Okafor 19'; Abdullah Omar Sajib (yellow card) 28'; Tamang 75'; Mohammad Rasel Hossain (yellow card) 89'	Report	Rimon (yellow card) 21'; Dorielton 26' (pen.), 52', 78'; Sohel (yellow card) 45+3'; Bishwanath (yellow card) 47'; Saad (yellow card) 71'	Stadium: Bashundhara Kings Arena; Referee: Md Alamgir Sarker

11 April 2026 12	Bangladesh Police FC	0–2	Fortis FC	Gazipur
15:30 BST (UTC+6)		Report	Md Mithu Chowdhury 5'; Nova (yellow card) 37' (goal) 90+2'; Noyon Mia (yellow card) 55'; Kamcai Marma Aky (yellow card) 90'	Stadium: Shaheed Barkat Stadium; Referee: Tapash Roy

17 April 2025 13	Fortis FC	0–0	Arambagh KS	Dhaka
15:30 BST (UTC+6)		Report		Stadium: Bashundhara Kings Arena; Referee: Md Symoon Hasan Sany

24 April 2026 14	Dhaka Abahani	1–0	Fortis FC	Cumilla
15:30 BST (UTC+6)	Mithu 1' (o.g.); Papon (yellow card) 29'; Mitul (yellow card) 89'	Report	Abdullah Omar Sajib (yellow card) 17'; Fahad (yellow card) 33'; Md Rasel Hossain (yellow card) 71'; Mohammad Rony (yellow card) 76'	Stadium: Shaheed Dhirendranath Datta Stadium; Referee: Md Symoon Hasan Sany

1 May 2026 15	Fortis FC	3–2	Rahmatganj MFS	Dhaka
15:30 BST (UTC+6)	Okafor 11'; Babou 22', 48'; Murshed (yellow card) 61'	Report	Jayed 4'; Andrews Kwadwo Appau 20'	Stadium: Bashundhara Kings Arena; Referee: Mahmud Zamal Faruqee Nahid

8 May 2026 16	Fakirerpool YMC	1–7	Fortis FC	Gazipur
15:45 BST (UTC+6)	Ouattara Ben Ibrahim 19'	Report	Babou 6', 43', 45+7', 88'; Tamang 48'; Okafor 55', 67'	Stadium: Shaheed Barkat Stadium; Referee: Sabuj Das

15 May 2026 17	Fortis FC	2–0	Brothers Union	Dhaka
15:45 BST (UTC+6)	Md Murshed Ali 19'; Essa Jallow (yellow card) 53'; Perera (yellow card) 90+1'; Babou (penalty missed) 84' 90+4' (yellow card) 90+5'	Report	Gazi (yellow card) 17'; Dost (yellow card) 78'; Gaushul Akbor Sabin (yellow card) 86'	Stadium: Bashundhara Kings Arena; Referee: Md Symoon Hasan Sany

23 May 2026 18	PWD Sports Club	2–2	Fortis FC	Gazipur
15:45 BST (UTC+6)	Faysal 49'; Kwadwo Acquah 54' (yellow card) 55'; Kofi Junior Dabanka (yellow card) 60'; Abdullah (yellow card) 80'	Report	Md Rasel Hossain (yellow card) 65'; Sajed Hasan Jummon Nijum 69'; P. Babou 74' (pen.)	Stadium: Shaheed Barkat Stadium; Referee: Sabuj Das

=== Group B ===
Pos	Team	Pld	W	D	L	GF	GA	GD	Pts	Qualification
1	Bashundhara Kings	4	2	2	0	10	2	+8	8	Qualified for QRF 1
2	Mohammedan SC	4	2	2	0	8	3	+5	8	Advanced to QRF 2
3	Bangladesh Police	4	2	0	2	6	8	−2	6	
4	Fortis FC	4	1	2	1	7	4	+3	5	
5	Arambagh KS	4	0	0	4	0	14	−14	0	

Source: Sofascore

==== Matches ====
23 September 2025	Bashundhara Kings	1–1	Fortis FC	Dhaka
14:45 BST (UTC+6)	Dorielton 49'	Report	Kazi 85' (o.g.)	Stadium: Bashundhara Kings Arena; Referee: Md Nasir Uddin

2 December 2025	Fortis FC	1–1	Mohammedan SC	Comilla
14:30 BST (UTC+6)	Okafor 28'	Report	Boateng 86'	Stadium: Shaheed Dhirendranath Datta Stadium; Referee: Md Jalal Uddin

16 December 2025	Arambagh KS	0–4	Fortis FC	Dhaka
14:30 BST (UTC+6)		Report	Sajed Hasan Jummon Nijum 26'; Babou 33' (pen.); Okafor 68'; Md Murshed Ali 75'	Stadium: Bashundhara Kings Arena; Referee: Md Nasir Uddin

7 April 2026	Bangladesh Police	2–1	Fortis FC	Dhaka
14:30 BST (UTC+6)	S. Kagimu 66'; M. Rahul 79'	Report	Okafor 37'	Stadium: Bashundhara Kings Arena; Referee: Md Symoon Hasan Sany

== Statistics ==
=== Goalscorers ===
As of 23 May 2026

Rank	Player	Position	Total	BFL	Federation Cup
1	(The Gambia) Pa Omar Babou	FW	15	14	1
1	(Nigeria) Onyekachi Okafor	FW	10	7	3
2	(Bangladesh) Md Murshed Ali	FW	2	1	1
2	(Bangladesh) Riaj Uddin Sagor	FW	2	2	0
2	(Bangladesh) Sajed Hasan Jummon Nijum	MF	2	1	1
2	(The Gambia) Essa Jallow	MF	2	2	0
2	(Nepal) Ananta Tamang	DF	2	2	0
3	(Bangladesh) Md Mithu Chowdhury	DF	1	1	0
3	(Bangladesh) Piash Ahmed Nova	FW	1	1	0
Own goal			1	0	1
Total			37	30	7
