= Piash Ahmed Nova =

Bangladeshi footballer

Personal information
- Full name: Md Piash Ahmed Nova
- Date of birth: 25 September 2005 (age 21)
- Place of birth: Kushtia, Bangladesh
- Height: 1.83 m (6 ft 0 in)
- Position: Striker

Team information
- Current team: City Club
- Number: 20

Youth career
- 2017–2023: BKSP

Senior career*
Years	Team	Apps	(Gls)
2021	Alamgir SKKS	4	(4)
2021–2023	Bashundhara Kings	0	(0)
2022–2023	→ Sheikh Jamal DC (loan)	6	(0)
2023–2024	Sheikh Jamal DC	5	(0)
2024–2026	Fortis	28	(7)
2026–	City Club	1	(0)

International career^{‡}
2019	Bangladesh U17	5	(1)
2022–2024	Bangladesh U20	17	(8)
2023–	Bangladesh U23	9	(0)
2024–	Bangladesh	1	(0)
Medal record
Men's football
Representing Bangladesh
SAFF U-17 Championship
Bronze medal – third place	2019 India	Team
SAFF U-20 Championship
Runner-up	2022 India	Team
Winner	2024 Nepal	Team
- * Club domestic league appearances and goals as of 18 September 2026 ‡ National team caps and goals as of 7 June 2026

Piash Ahmed Nova (Bengali: পিয়াস আহমেদ নোভা; born 25 September 2005) is a Bangladeshi professional footballer who plays as a striker for Bangladesh Football League club City Club.

== Early career ==
Piash Ahmed Nova was born in Amla Union of Kushtia District. He is from a family of three brothers and one sister. His older brother, Pial Ahmed Shiva, helped him get admitted to Bangladesh Krira Shikkha Protishtan (BKSP), where Nova participated in many football tournaments while continuing his education. In 2020, he scored a hat-trick for BSKP in the third place playoff of the 9th Bangladesh Games against Satkhira District.

== Club career ==
=== Alamgir Somaj Kollayan KS ===
In 2021, Nova joined Alamgir Somaj Kollayan KS during the Super League round of the initially delayed 2019–20 Dhaka Third Division League season. On 28 August 2021, he scored a goal in a 8–1 victory over Asaduzzaman FA. On 9 September 2021, Nova scored a hat-trick in the season-ending game against The Muslim Institute, during a 6–0 victory. Eventually, Nova ended his first season playing domestic football with 4 goals from 4 matches, as the club mainly consisting of BKSP students went onto lift the league title.

=== Bashundhara Kings ===
In October 2021, Nova joined Bangladesh Premier League club Bashundhara Kings, after impressing the club's president, Imrul Hassan, with his performance in the Dhaka Third Division League. Nonetheless, he was unable to make the matchday squad even once during his first season with a professional league club.

=== Sheikh Jamal Dhanmondi Club ===
In October 2022, Nova was loaned out to Sheikh Jamal Dhanmondi Club. On 23 December 2022, he made his professional league debut, as a stoppage time substitute against Muktijoddha Sangsad KC. He missed an integral part of the season while preparing for his SSC examination, making a total of six appearances in the league from which he started in only one. In July 2023, it was confirmed that he would remain with the Dhanmondi outfit on a permanent basis.

=== Fortis ===
On 19 August 2024, Nova joined Fortis.

== International career ==
=== Youth ===
In August 2019, Nova was selected for the Bangladesh U15 for the 2019 SAFF U-15 Championship by coach Mutafa Anwar Parvez. He started in the last group game against India U15 as defending champions, Bangladesh, failed to make the tournament final. He also made substitute appearances against both Bhutan U16 and Qatar U16 during Bangladesh's failed 2020 AFC U-16 Championship qualification campaign. On 18 October 2019, Nova scored his first international goal, in a 3–0 victory over Faroe Islands U16 in the UEFA Assist U-16 Development Tournament. Under Englishman Robert Martin Ryles, the Bangladesh team were unbeaten champions of the tournament.

On 27 July 2022, in the opening game of the 2022 SAFF U-20 Championship, Nova scored a brace in a 2–1 victory over hosts India U20. He scored again in a 1–1 draw against Nepal U20, on 2 August 2022, to ensure the country's spot in the final. Nonetheless, Bangladesh finished runners-up of the tournament, losing the final 2–5 to India. On 12 September 2022, Nova scored the opener in a 2–1 victory over Bhutan U20 in the 2023 AFC U-20 Championship qualifiers. He also found the net in the final group game against Nepal, as Bangladesh missed out on qualification to the main tournament by finishing third in the group.

On 6 September 2023, Nova made his debut for Bangladesh U23 in a 0–2 defeat to Malaysia U23 during the 2024 AFC U-23 Asian Cup qualifiers. He was also selected in the final squad for the 2022 Asian Games in Hangzhou, China.

== Career statistics ==
=== Club ===
As of 29 May 2024.

Appearances and goals by club, season and competition
Club	Season	League			Domestic Cup (Note: Appearance(s) in Bangladesh Federation Cup)		Other (Note: Appearance(s) in Bangladesh Independence Cup)		Continental		Total	
Club	Season	Division	Apps	Goals	Apps	Goals	Apps	Goals	Apps	Goals	Apps	Goals
Alamgir SKKS	2019–20	Dhaka Third Division League	4	4	—		—		—		4	4
Bashundhara Kings	2021–22	Bangladesh Premier League	0	0	0	0	0	0	0	0	0	0
Sheikh Jamal DC (loan)	2022–23	Bangladesh Premier League	6	0	2	0	0	0	—		8	0
Sheikh Jamal DC	2023–24	Bangladesh Premier League	5	0	0	0	0	0	—		5	0
Fortis	2024–25	Bangladesh Premier League	0	0	0	0	0	0	—		0	0
Career total			15	4	2	0	0	0	0	0	17	4

=== International ===
As of 16 November 2024.

Bangladesh
Year	Apps	Goals
2024	1	0
Total	1	0

=== International goals ===
==== Youth ====
Scores and results list Bangladesh's goal tally first.

No.	Date	Venue	Opponent	Score	Result	Competition
1.	18 October 2019	Dhaka, Bangabandhu National Stadium, Bangladesh	Faroe Islands	2–0	3–0	UEFA Assist U-16 Development Tournament
–	20 August 2019	Kolkata, Kalyani, India	(India) United SC	2–0	3–0	Unofficial Friendly
2.	27 July 2022	Bhubaneswar, Kalinga Stadium, India	India	1–0	2–1	2022 SAFF U-20 Championship
3.	27 July 2022	Bhubaneswar, Kalinga Stadium, India	India	2–1	2–1	2022 SAFF U-20 Championship
4.	2 August 2022	Bhubaneswar, Kalinga Stadium, India	Nepal	1–0	1–1	2022 SAFF U-20 Championship
5.	12 September 2022	Al Muharraq Stadium, Arad, Bahrain	Bhutan	1–0	2–1	2023 AFC U-20 Championship qualifiers
6.	18 September 2022	Al Muharraq Stadium, Arad, Bahrain	Nepal	2–0	3–0	2023 AFC U-20 Championship qualifiers
7.	20 August 2024	Lalitpur, ANFA Complex, Nepal	Sri Lanka	2–0	2–0	2024 SAFF U-20 Championship
8.	28 August 2024	Lalitpur, ANFA Complex, Nepal	Nepal	4–1	4–1	2024 SAFF U-20 Championship
9.	27 September 2024	Haiphong, Lạch Tray Stadium, Vietnam	Vietnam	1–2	1–4	2025 AFC U-20 Championship qualifiers
Last updated 27 September 2024

== Honours ==
Bangladesh U-20

- SAFF U-20 Championship: 2024

Alamgir Somaj Kollayan KS

- Dhaka Third Division League: 2019–20

Bangladesh U-15

- UEFA Assist U-16 Development Tournament: 2019
