= 2024–25 Fortis FC season =

Fortis FC 2024–25 football season

Fortis FC
2024–25 season
- Owner: Fortis Group
- President: Md Shahin Hasan
- Head coach: Masud Parvez Kaisar
- Stadium: Bashundhara Kings Arena
- Bangladesh Premier League: 6th of 10
- Federation Cup: Group stage
- Independence Cup: Did not held
- Top goalscorer: League: Pa Omar Babou (8 goals); All: Pa Omar Babou (8 goals)
- Biggest win: 3–0 v Fakirerpool Young Men's Club (Away); 13 December 2024 (Premier League); 3–0 v Dhaka Wanderers Club (Federation Cup); 31 December 2024
- Biggest defeat: 1–3 v Rahmatganj MFS (Away); 30 November 2024 (Premier League)

The 2024–25 season was the Fortis FC's 6th season since its establishment in 2020 and their 4th season in the angladesh Premier League. In addition to domestic league, Fortis FC participated on this season's edition of Federation Cup. The season covered period was from 1 June 2024 to 29 May 2025.

== Players ==
As of 1 June 2023

No.	Player	Nat.	Position(s)	Date Of Birth	Year signed	Previous club
Goalkeepers
1	Azad Hossain	(Bangladesh)	GK	15 February 1999 (aged 25)	2022	Chittagong Abahani
22	Shanto Kumar Roy	(Bangladesh)	GK	2 September 2003 (aged 20)	2022	Saif Sporting Club
32	Md Sarwar Jahan	(Bangladesh)	GK	5 August 1986 (aged 37)	2024	Sheikh Russel KC
Defenders
2	Abdullah Omar Sajib	(Bangladesh)	CB	17 October 1994 (aged 29)	2020	
3	Saddam Hossain Anny	(Bangladesh)	LB	21 January 1991 (aged 33)	2023	Rahmatganj MFS
5	Jasur Jumaev	(Uzbekistan)	CB	16 January 2000 (aged 24)	2023	(Uzbekistan) Xorazm Urganch
12	Noyon Mia	(Bangladesh)	RB	6 February 1999 (aged 25)	2023	Rahmatganj MFS
16	Rashedul Islam Rashed	(Bangladesh)	LB	15 January 1990 (aged 34)	2023	Muktijoddha Sangsad
24	Kamacai Marma Aky	(Bangladesh)	CB	12 July 2005 (aged 18)	2023	Fortis Academy
75	Md Shajahan Ali	(Bangladesh)	CB		2024	
Midfielders
8	Mamunul Islam	(Bangladesh)	CM	12 December 1988 (aged 35)	2022	Rahmatganj MFS
18	Sajed Hasan Jummon Nijum	(Bangladesh)	AM/RM	5 January 2004 (aged 20)	2023	BFF Elite Academy
20	Mazharul Islam Sourav	(Bangladesh)	DM	1 January 1990 (aged 34)	2022	Sheikh Jamal DC
21	Md Farhad Mona	(Bangladesh)	DM	24 June 2002 (aged 21)	2023	Chittagong Abahani
23	Didarul Alam	(Bangladesh)	AM/LM	5 January 1996 (aged 28)	2022	Muktijoddha Sangsad
29	Shantu Das	(Bangladesh)	DM		2023	Uttara FC
Forwards
7	Borhan Uddin	(Bangladesh)	RW	1 May 2001 (aged 23)	2020	Tongi Krira Chakra
10	Pa Omar Babou	(The Gambia)	FW	1 October 1998 (aged 25)	2023	(Morocco) SCC Mohammédia
11	Shakhawat Hossain Rony	(Bangladesh)	CF	8 October 1991 (aged 32)	2022	Chittagong Abahani
17	Valeriy Gryshyn	(Ukraine)	RW/LW/AM	12 May 1994 (aged 30)	2023	(Cambodia) Phnom Penh Crown FC
26	Rahmat Ullah Jisan	(Bangladesh)	CF	3 June 2005 (aged 18)	2023	Fortis Academy
31	Omar Sarr	(The Gambia)	CF	2 September 1994 (aged 29)	2023	

== Transfer ==
=== In ===
Date	No.	Position	Player	From	Fee	Source
1 June 2024	18	MF	Sajed Hasan Jummon Nijum	BFF Elite Academy	Free	
19 August 2024	13	MF	Atiqur Rahman Fahad	Sheikh Jamal DC	Free	
19 August 2024	14	DF	Monjurur Rahman Manik	Sheikh Jamal DC	Free	
19 August 2024	19	FW	Piash Ahmed Nova	Sheikh Jamal DC	Free	
19 August 2024	33	MF	Mohammad Abdullah	Sheikh Jamal DC	Free	
19 August 2024	77	MF	Biplu Ahmed	Bashundhara Kings	Free	
19 August 2024	4	DF	Mohammad Rocky	Rahmatganj MFS	Free	
19 August 2024	21	FW	Riaj Uddin Sagor	Chittagong Abahani	Free	
19 August 2024	15	DF	(The Gambia) Essa Jallow	Unattached	Free	

=== Out ===
Date	No.	Position	Player	Moved to	Fee	Source
19 August 2024		DF	Sabuz Hossain	Abahani Limited Dhaka	Free	
19 August 2024		FW	Arman Foysal Akash	Abahani Limited Dhaka	Free	
19 August 2024		MF	(Japan) Soma Otani	Free agent		

=== Preseason friendly ===
5 November 2024 Friendly Match	Bangladesh	1–0	Fortis FC	Dhaka
14:00 BST (UTC+6)	Piash 48'			Stadium: Bashundhara Kings Arena

8 November 2024 Friendly Match	Bangladesh	3–2	Fortis FC	Dhaka
14:00 BST (UTC+6)	Morsalin 17'; Piash 25'; Emon 67'			Stadium: Bashundhara Kings Arena

== Competitions ==
Win Draw Loss Fixtures

=== Overall ===
Competition	First match	Last match	Final Position
BPL	30 November 2024	29 May 2025	7th
Federation Cup	3 December 2024	14 January 2025	Group stage
Independence Cup	Not held		

=== Overview ===
Competition	Record							
Competition	Pld	W	D	L	GF	GA	GD	Win %
BPL	18	6	9	3	24	15	+9	33.33
Independence Cup; Did not held	0	0	0	0	0	0	+0	—
Federation Cup	4	2	1	1	5	1	+4	50.00
Total	22	8	10	4	29	16	+13	36.36

Source: Competitions

=== Premier League ===
==== League table ====
Pos	Team	Pld	W	D	L	GF	GA	GD	Pts
4	Rahmatganj	18	9	3	6	39	25	+14	30
5	Brothers Union	18	7	6	5	28	18	+10	27
6	Fortis	18	6	9	3	24	15	+9	27
7	Bangladesh Police	18	8	3	7	23	24	−1	27
8	Fakirerpool	18	6	1	11	23	54	−31	19

Source: Soccerway
Rules for classification: 1) Points; 2) Goal difference; 3) Goals scored.

==== Results summary ====
Overall								Home						Away					
Pld	W	D	L	GF	GA	GD	Pts	W	D	L	GF	GA	GD	W	D	L	GF	GA	GD
18	6	9	3	24	15	+9	27	2	7	0	10	7	+3	4	2	3	14	8	+6

Source: Soccerway

==== Results by round ====
Round	1	2	3	4	5	6	7	8	9	10	11	12	13	14	15	16	17	18
Ground	A	H	A	H	A	H	A	A	H	H	A	H	A	H	A	H	A	A
Result	L	D	W	D	L	D	D	D	W	W	W	D	L	D	W	D	D	W
Position	7	7	7	7	7	6	6	6	6	6	5	7	7	7	7	7	7	7

Source: Matches
A = Away; H = Home; W = Win; D = Draw; L = Loss; P = Postponed

=== Matches ===
19 November 2024 1	Rahmatganj MFS	3–1	Fortis FC	Munshigonj
14:30 BST (UTC+6)	Istekharul Alam Shakil (yellow card) 26'; Mamoud Oshie 59'; Taj 67'; Felix Tetteh 70'	Report	Jasur Jumaev (yellow card) 26'; Manik 74'	Stadium: Shaheed Bir Sreshtho Flight Lieutenant Matiur Rahman Stadium; Referee: Bituraj Barua

7 December 2024 2	Fortis FC	1–1	Brothers Union	Dhaka
14:30 BST (UTC+6)	Pa Omar 18' (yellow card) 61'; Didarul Alam (yellow card) 40'; Essa Jallow (yellow card) 60'	Report	Cheikh Sene 1' (yellow card) 7'; Nira (yellow card) 60'	Stadium: Bashundhara Kings Arena; Referee: Alamgir Sarker

13 December 2024 3	Fakirerpool YMC	0–3	Fortis FC	Gazipur
14:30 BST (UTC+6)	Mehedi Hasan Polash (yellow card) 60'; Turaev (yellow card) 86'	Report	Essa Jallow (yellow card) 21'; Omar Sarr 52'; Nova 57', 85'; Babou (yellow card) 59'	Stadium: Shaheed Barkat Stadium; Referee: Anisur Rahman Sagor

21 December 2024 4	Fortis FC	1–1	Dhaka Wanderers	Dhaka
14:30 BST (UTC+6)	V. Gryshyn 52'; Jasur Jumaev (yellow card) 77'	Report	Mohammed Sohag Mia (yellow card) 25'; Sakib Bepari Babu 37'; Md Shawon (yellow card) 71'	Stadium: Bashundhara Kings Arena; Referee: Sabuj Kumar Das

27 December 2024 5	Mohammedan SC	1–0	Fortis FC	Comilla
14:30 BST (UTC+6)	S. Emmanuel 17'; Md Jewel (yellow card) 37'; M. Ballu (yellow card) 41'; Mahbub Alam (yellow card) 57'	Report		Stadium: Shaheed Dhirendranath Datta Stadium; Referee: Bituraj Barua

3 January 2025 6	Fortis FC	0–0	Dhaka Abahani	Dhaka
14:45 BST (UTC+6)	Noyon Mia (yellow card) 19'; A. Fahad (yellow card) 43'; Jasur Jumaev (yellow card) 90+1'	Report	E. Gazi (yellow card) 16'	Stadium: Bashundhara Kings Arena; Referee: Mahaud Zamal Farooque Nahid

11 January 2025 7	Bangladesh Police FC	1–1	Fortis FC	Mymensingh
14:45 BST (UTC+6)	I. Faysal (yellow card) 12'; A. Shaeid (yellow card) 62'; Morshedul Islam 90+2'	Report	M. Manik (red card) 54'; P. Nova 90+3'	Stadium: Rafiq Uddin Bhuiyan Stadium; Referee: Md Jalal Uddin

18 January 2025 8	Fortis FC	1–1	Bashundhara Kings	Dhaka
17:30 BST (UTC+6)	A. Fahad (yellow card) 30'; M. Abdullah 63'; Noyon Mia (yellow card) 70'	Report	T. Barman 11'; R. Hossain (yellow card) 38'; S. Rana (yellow card) 65'	Stadium: Bashundhara Kings Arena; Referee: Jashim Akhter

25 January 2025 9	Fortis FC	1–0	Chittagong Abahani	Dhaka
14:45 BST (UTC+6)	Essa Jallow 34'	Report	Shuvo Rajbongshi (yellow card) 47'	Stadium: Bashundhara Kings Arena; Referee: Sabuj Das

21 February 2025 10	Fortis FC	3–1	Rahmatganj MFS	Dhaka
15:00 BST (UTC+6)	V. Hryshyn 38'; P. Babou 49' (pen.), 90+1'; Abdullah Omar Sajib (yellow card) 45+3'; Md Farhad Mona (yellow card) 73'; Jasur Jumaev (yellow card) 90+3'	Report	M. Oshie (penalty missed) 23' (yellow card) 77'; S. Boateng 54'	Stadium: Bashundhara Kings Arena; Referee: Md Jalal Uddin

12 April 2025 11	Brothers Union	0–2	Fortis FC	Munshigonj
15:30 BST (UTC+6)	S. Rana (yellow card) 34'; Monir Alam (yellow card) 45+2'; M. Udoh (yellow card) 57'	Report	Kamacai Marma Aky 45'; P. Babou 60'; Jasur Jumaev (yellow card) 70'	Stadium: Shaheed Bir Sreshtho Flight Lieutenant Matiur Rahman Stadium; Referee: Anisur Rahman

25 April 2025 12	Fortis FC	1–1	Fakirerpool YMC	Dhaka
15:30 BST (UTC+6)	O. Ifegwu 33'; A. Fahad (yellow card) 52'; Md Sarwan Jahan Nipu (red card) 56'; MD Forhad Mona (yellow card) 80'; Kamacai Marma Aky (yellow card) 87'	Report	Mohamed Fofana (yellow card) 45'; Ben Ibrahim Quattara 65'	Stadium: Bashundhara Kings Arena; Referee: Jashim Akther

2 May 2025 13	Dhaka Wanderers	1–0	Fortis FC	Gazipur
15:45 BST (UTC+6)	N. Rasel (yellow card) 17'; Abu Sufian Yousuf Sifat 90+6' (yellow card) 90+7'	Report		Stadium: Shaheed Barkat Stadium; Referee: Jashim Akther

9 May 2025 14	Fortis FC	1–1	Mohammedan SC	Dhaka
16:00 BST (UTC+6)	P. Nova 23'	Report	Shakib Al Hasan (yellow card) 45+2'; M. Muzaffarov (yellow card) 45+5'; Mahbub Alam 73'	Stadium: Bashundhara Kings Arena; Referee: Md Jalal Uddin

17 May 2025 15	Dhaka Abahani	1–2	Fortis FC	Cumilla
16:00 BST (UTC+6)	R. Augusto (yellow card) 33'; S. Reza (yellow card) 75'; M. Ridoy 80'; S. Hossain (yellow card) 90+1'	Report	P. Omar 19' (pen.); Noyon Mia (yellow card) 20'; Essa Jallow (yellow card) 45+1' (goal) 77'; Abdullah Omar Sajib (red card) 75'	Stadium: Shaheed Dhirendranath Datta Stadium; Referee: Saymoon Hasan Sany

21 May 2025 16	Fortis FC	1–1	Bangladesh Police FC	Dhaka
16:00 BST (UTC+6)	Al-Amin 44'; Ismail Hossain (yellow card) 55'; Md Anik Hossain (yellow card) 64'; Alexander Moreno (yellow card) 87'	Report	Fahad (yellow card) 33'; Babou 67'	Stadium: Bashundhara Kings Arena; Referee: Mahmud Zamal Farouqee Nahid

24 May 2025 17	Bashundhara Kings	1–1	Fortis FC	Dhaka
18:00 BST (UTC+6)	Fahim (yellow card) 24'; Mojibur (yellow card) 43'; Sohel (yellow card) 57'; Morsalin 80'	Report	Essa Jallow (yellow card) 20'; Abdullah 67' (yellow card) 68'	Stadium: Bashundhara Kings Arena; Referee: Jashim Akhter

29 May 2025 18	Chittagong Abahani	0–4	Fortis FC	Mymensingh
16:00 BST (UTC+6)	Sajon Miah (yellow card) 6'; Diamond; Kwasi Adiefe (yellow card) 70'	Report	Pa Omar 8', 64' (yellow card) 65'; Piash 36', 45'; Jasur Jumaev (yellow card) 75'; Shakhawat (yellow card) 86'	Stadium: Mymensingh Zilla Stadium; Referee: Nazmul Huda

=== Federation Cup ===
==== Group stages ====
Pos	Team	Pld	W	D	L	GF	GA	GD	Pts	Qualification
1	Bashundhara Kings	4	3	0	1	9	4	+5	9	Qualified for QRF 1
2	Brothers Union	4	2	1	1	9	1	+8	7	Advanced to QRF 2
3	Fortis	4	2	1	1	5	1	+4	7	
4	Bangladesh Police	4	1	2	1	4	4	0	5	
5	Dhaka Wanderers	4	0	0	4	1	18	−17	0	

Source: Soccerway
Rules for classification: Group stages tiebreakers

3 December 2024	Bangladesh Police FC	0–0	Fortis FC	Mymensingh
14:30 BST (UTC+6)		Report		Stadium: Rafiq Uddin Bhuiyan Stadium; Referee: Mahmud Zamal Farouqee Nahid

17 December 2024	Bashundhara Kings	0–2	Fortis FC	Dhaka
14:30 BST (UTC+6)		Report	Jasur Jumaev 72'; Abdullah 80'	Stadium: Bashundhara Kings Arena; Referee: Md Alamgir Sarker

31 December 2024	Fortis FC	3–0	Dhaka Wanderers	Cumilla
14:30 BST (UTC+6)	Joy Kumar 45+2', 75'; Nova 89'	Report		Stadium: Shaheed Dhirendranath Datta Stadium; Referee: Md Jalal Uddin

14 January 2025	Brothers Union	1–0	Fortis FC	Cumilla
14:30 BST (UTC+6)	K. Rabbi 35'	Report		Stadium: Shaheed Dhirendranath Datta Stadium; Referee: Md Jalal Uddin

== Statistics ==
=== Goalscorers ===
As of 29 May 2025

Rank	Player	Position	Total	BPL	Federation Cup
1	(The Gambia) Pa Omar Babou	FW	8	8	0
2	(Bangladesh) Piash Ahmed Nova	FW	7	6	1
3	(Bangladesh) Mohammad Abdullah	MF	3	2	1
4	(Bangladesh) Joy Kumar	MF	2	0	2
4	(The Gambia) Essa Jallow	DF	2	2	0
4	(Ukraine) Valeriy Gryshyn	FW	2	2	0
5	(Bangladesh) Atiqur Rahman Fahad	MF	1	1	0
5	(Bangladesh) Kamacai Marma Aky	DF	1	1	0
5	(The Gambia) Omar Sarr	FW	1	1	0
5	(Uzbekistan) Jasur Jumaev	DF	1	0	1
5	(Nigeria) Ojukwu David Ifegwu	FW	1	1	0
Total			29	24	5
