= Javier Cabrera =

Javier Cabrera may refer to:

- Javier Cabrera (football manager) (born 1984), Spanish football manager
- Javier Cabrera (footballer) (born 1992), Uruguayan footballer
