= 2024–25 Bashundhara Kings season =

Bashundhara Kings 2024–25 football season

Bashundhara Kings
2024–25 season
- Owner: Bashundhara Group
- President: Imrul Hassan
- Head coach: Valeriu Tita
- Stadium: Bashundhara Kings Arena
- Bangladesh Premier League: 3rd of 10
- Federation Cup: Champions
- Challenge Cup: Champions
- AFC Challenge League: Group stage
- Top goalscorer: League: Rakib Hossain (11 goals); All: Rakib Hossain (12 goals)
- Biggest win: 7–0 Vs Fakirerpool YMC (Away); Premier League (20 May 2025); 7–0 Vs Chittagong Abahani (Home); Premier League (29 November 2024)
- Biggest defeat: 0–4 Vs (India) East Bengal FC (Neutral); AFC Challenge League (29 October 2024)
Home colours	Away colours

The 2024–25 season was the Bashundhara Kings's 12th competitive professional season since its creation in 2013, and 7th consecutive season in Bangladesh Premier League, country's top-tier football league. In addition to the domestic league, Bashundhara Kings is participated in this season's edition of AFC Challenge League, Federation Cup and Challenge Cup.

== Players ==
Players and squad numbers last updated on 26 October 2024.
Note: Flags indicate national team as has been defined under FIFA eligibility rules. Players may hold more than one non-FIFA nationality.

No.	Nat.	Player	Position(s)	Date of birth	Year signed	Previous club
Goalkeepers
1	(Bangladesh)	Anisur Rahman Zico (Vice-captain)	GK	10 August 1997 (age 29)	2018	Saif Sporting Club
27	(Bangladesh)	Shahin Molla	GK		2024	
30	(Bangladesh)	Mehedi Hasan	GK	2 January 2004 (age 22)	2020	Youth team
50	(Bangladesh)	Mehedi Hasan Srabon	GK	12 August 2005 (age 21)	2023	Muktijoddha SKC
66	(Bangladesh)	Md. Asif	GK	20 October 2006 (age 20)	2023	BFF Elite Academy
Defenders
2	(Nigeria)	Isaiah Ejeh	RB / CB	19 September 2002 (age 24)	2024	(Nigeria) Kwara United
4	(Bangladesh)	Topu Barman (Vice-captain)	CB	20 December 1994 (age 31)	2019	Abahani Ltd. Dhaka
5	(Bangladesh)	Tutul Hossain Badsha	CB	20 August 1999 (age 27)	2022	Abahani Ltd. Dhaka
12	(Bangladesh)	Bishwanath Ghosh	RB / CB	30 May 1999 (age 27)	2019	Sheikh Russel KC
18	(Bangladesh)	Mohammed Jahid Hossen	LB	1 June 2002 (age 24)	2023	Mohammedan SC
22	(Bangladesh)	Md Saad Uddin	RB / RM / RW	1 September 1998 (age 28)	2022	Sheikh Russel KC
28	(Bangladesh)	Yousuf Ali			2024	
40	(Bangladesh)	Tariq Kazi	RWB / LWB / CB	6 October 2000 (age 26)	2019	(Finland) Ilves
52	(Bangladesh)	Insan Hossain			2024	
71	(Bangladesh)	Rimon Hossain	LB / LM	1 July 2005 (age 21)	2019	Arambagh FA
90	(Bangladesh)	Riaj Molla			2024	
Midfielders
6	(Bangladesh)	Md Sohel Rana	DM / CM / AM	1 June 1996 (age 30)	2023	Abahani Ltd. Dhaka
8	(Brazil)	Miguel Figueira	AM	22 April 2000 (age 26)	2022	(Brazil) Goias
14	(Bangladesh)	Chandon Roy	DM / CM	4 May 2007 (age 19)	2024	Sheikh Russel KC
17	(Bangladesh)	Sohel Rana	CM / DM / AM	27 March 1995 (age 31)	2021	Abahani Ltd. Dhaka
29	(Bangladesh)	Mohsin Ahmed			2024	
	(Ivory Coast)	Didier Brossou (remained as unregistered player in BPL 2nd phase)	CM / AM	23 December 1989 (age 36)	2023	Sheikh Russel KC
24	(Bangladesh)	Suibur Rahman Mizan			2024	
33	(Bangladesh)	Shekh Morsalin	AM / CM	25 November 2005 (age 20)	2021	Alamgir Somaj Kollayan KS
37	(Bangladesh)	Mojibur Rahman Jony	CM / AM	1 January 2005 (age 21)	2023	Fortis FC
44	(Bangladesh)	Md Sabbir Hossain	CM / DM / LB	28 June 2003 (age 23)	2022	Swadhinata KS
47	(Bangladesh)	Akmol Hossan Noyon			2024	
69	(Bangladesh)	Mahmudul Hasan			2024	
95	(Brazil)	Fernandes			2024	
Forwards
7	(Bangladesh)	Rakib Hossain	RW / SS	18 November 1998 (age 27)	2022	Abahani Ltd. Dhaka
9	(France)	Jared Khasa	RW / CF	4 November 1997 (age 29)	2024	(Ukraine) Karpaty Lviv
11	(Bangladesh)	Foysal Ahmed Fahim	RW / CF	24 February 2002 (age 24)	2024	Sheikh Jamal DC
19	(Bangladesh)	Rabby Hossen Rahul	LW / RW	30 December 2007 (age 18)	2021	Bikrampur Kings
23	(Bangladesh)	Rafiqul Islam	LW / RW	12 February 2004 (age 22)	2023	Fortis FC
Left during the season
10	(Brazil)	Robinho (captain)	LW / RW / AM	21 July 1995 (age 31)	2020	(Brazil) Fluminense FC

== Transfers ==
=== Transfers in ===
No.	Position	Player	Previous club	Fee	Date	Ref.
6	MF	(Brazil) Fernandes	Abahani Limited	Free	1 August 2024	
11	FW	Foysal Ahmed Fahim	Sheikh Jamal Dhanmondi Club	Free	19 August 2024	
19	FW	Md Rabby Hossen Rahul	Brothers Union	Loan Return	19 August 2024	
52	FW	Md Insane Hossain	Brothers Union	Loan Return	19 August 2024	
29	MF	Mohsin Ahmed	Brothers Union	Free	19 August 2024	
27	GK	MD Sahin Molla	Uttar Baridhara Club	Free	19 August 2024	
14	MF	Chandon Roy	Sheikh Russel KC	Free	19 August 2024	
2	DF	(Nigeria) Isaiah Ejeh	(Nigeria) Kwara United F.C.	Free	20 August 2024	
	FW	(Ukraine) Valeriy Hryshyn	Fortis FC	Loan transfer	20 August 2024	
	DF	(Uzbekistan) Jasur Jumaev	Fortis FC	Loan transfer	20 August 2024	
9	FW	(France) Jared Khasa	(Ukraine) FC Karpaty Lviv	Free	22 August 2024	

=== Transfers out ===
No.	Position	Player	Moved To	Fee	Date	Ref.
44	DF	(Uzbekistan) Boburbek Yuldashov	(Uzbekistan) FC Bunyodkor	Free	27 July 2024	
77	MF	(Uzbekistan) Asror Gofurov	(Uzbekistan) Qizilqum FC	Free	30 July 2024	

== Pre-season and friendlies ==
11 October 2024	Bashundhara Kings	4–0	Brothers Union	Dhaka
17:30 BST (UTC+6)	Fahim ×2; Morsalin; Sarr			Stadium: Bashundhara Kings Arena

17 October 2024	Bashundhara Kings	4–1	Fortis FC	Dhaka
18:00 BST (UTC+6)	Fernandes; Jony; Morsalin; Ejeh		Mamunul	Stadium: Bashundhara Kings Arena

== Competitions ==
Win Draw Loss Fixtures

=== Overall ===
Competition	First match	Last match	Final Position
BPL	29 November 2024	27 May 2025	3rd
AFC Challenge League	26 October 2024	1 November 2024	4th in Group Stage
Federation Cup	3 December 20234	29 April 2025	Champions
Challenge Cup	22 November 2024	22 November 2024	Champions

=== Overview ===
Competition	Record							
Competition	Pld	W	D	L	GF	GA	GD	Win %
BPL	18	9	5	4	45	15	+30	50.00
AFC Challenge League	3	0	0	3	1	7	−6	0.00
Federation Cup	7	5	0	2	13	7	+6	71.43
Challenge Cup	1	1	0	0	3	1	+2	100.00
Total	29	15	5	9	62	30	+32	51.72

Source: Competitions

=== Premier League ===
==== League table ====
Pos	Team	Pld	W	D	L	GF	GA	GD	Pts	Qualification or relegation
1	Mohammedan (Note: Mohammedan does not possess an AFC Challenge League licence.) (C)	18	13	3	2	46	16	+30	42	
2	Dhaka Abahani	18	10	5	3	31	8	+23	35	Qualification for the AFC Challenge League qualifying stage
3	Bashundhara Kings (W)	18	9	5	4	45	15	+30	32	Qualification for the AFC Challenge League qualifying stage (Note: as Federation Cup winners.)
4	Rahmatganj	18	9	3	6	39	25	+14	30	
5	Brothers Union	18	7	6	5	28	18	+10	27	

Source: Soccerway
Rules for classification: 1) Points; 2) Goal difference; 3) Goals scored.
(C) Champion; (W) Cup Winner

==== Results summary ====
Overall								Home						Away					
Pld	W	D	L	GF	GA	GD	Pts	W	D	L	GF	GA	GD	W	D	L	GF	GA	GD
18	9	5	4	65	20	+45	32	5	2	2	45	15	+30	4	3	2	20	5	+15

Source: Soccerway

==== Results by round ====
Round	1	2	3	4	5	6	7	8	9	10	11	12	13	14	15	16	17	18
Ground	H	A	H	A	H	A	A	A	A	A	H	A	H	A	H	A	H	H
Result	W	L	W	L	D	W	W	D	W	W	L	D	W	D	L	W	D	W
Position	1	5	3	5	5	5	5	4	3	3	3	3	3	3	3	3	3	3

Source: Matches
A = Away; H = Home; W = Win; D = Draw; L = Loss; P = Postponed

=== Matches ===
29 November 2024 1	Bashundhara Kings	7–0	Chittagong Abahani	Dhaka
17:30 BST (UTC+6)	Khasa 3', 39'; Fahim 23'; Miguel 29'; Ejeh (yellow card) 59'; Jony 70'; Rakib 73', 84'	Report	Ashik (yellow card) 52'	Stadium: Bashundhara Kings Arena; Referee: Anisur Rahman; Man of the Match: Miguel

6 December 2024 2	Mohammedan SC	1–0	Bashundhara Kings	Cumilla
14:30 BST (UTC+6)	Minhajul (yellow card) 17'; Sujon (red card); Diabate 58'; Muzaffarov (yellow card) 88'; Shakib (yellow card) 90+5'	Report	Sadd (yellow card) 8'; Sohel (yellow card) 42'; Rimon (yellow card) 56'; Miguel (yellow card) 88'	Stadium: Shaheed Dhirendranath Datta Stadium; Referee: Md Saymoon Hassan Sany

14 December 2024 3	Bashundhara Kings	4–1	Rahmatganj MFS	Dhaka
BST (UTC+6) 17:30	Sohel Rana (yellow card) 3'; Fernandes 10'; Miguel 45+1'; Md Sohel Rana (yellow card) 25' (goal) 53'; Topu 76'		Jibon 12'	Stadium: Bashundhara Kings Arena; Referee: Jashim Akhter

20 December 2024 4	Abahani Limited Dhaka	1–0	Bashundhara Kings	Cumilla
14:30 BST (UTC+6)	Sumon 2'			Stadium: Shaheed Dhirendranath Datta Stadium; Referee: Md Jalal Uddin

27 December 2024 5	Bashundhara Kings	1–1	Brothers Union	Dhaka
17:30 BST (UTC+6)	Jony (yellow card) 57' (goal) 90+7'; Topu (yellow card) 81'; Figueira (yellow card) 90'	Report	Sufil (yellow card) 20'; C. Sene 39'; Sohel (yellow card) 45+6'; Rahmat (yellow card) 77'	Stadium: Bashundhara Kings Arena; Referee: Anisur Rahman Sagor

3 January 2025 6	Bangladesh Police FC	0–5	Bashundhara Kings	Mymensingh
14:45 BST	Morshedul Islam (yellow card) 44'; Alexander Moreno (red card) 85'; J. Ahmed (yellow card) 90+3'	Report	F. Fahim (yellow card) 3'; J. Fernandes 10', 38' (yellow card) 90+4'; M. Jony 13' (yellow card) 52'; R. Hossain 50'; T. Barman (yellow card) 73'; Isaiah Ejeh (yellow card) 74'; M. Figueira (yellow card) 89' (goal) 90+5'	Stadium: Rafiq Uddin Bhuiyan Stadium; Referee: Saymoon Hasan Sany

10 January 2025 7	Bashundhara Kings	4–1	Fakirerpool YMC	Dhaka
17:30 BST (UTC+6)	Fernandes 69'; Foysal 72'; Rafiqul 75'; Rakib 83'	Report	Tutul 2' (o.g.); Tias Das (yellow card) 11' (yellow-red card) 33'; Md Sabbir Hossain (yellow card) 33'; Segun Oduduwa (yellow card) 45+2'	Stadium: Bashundhara Kings Arena; Referee: Anisur Rahman Sagor

18 January 2025 8	Fortis FC	1–1	Bashundhara Kings	Dhaka
17:30 BST (UTC+6)	A. Fahad (yellow card) 30'; M. Abdullah 63'; Noyon Mia (yellow card) 70'	Report	T. Barman 11'; R. Hossain (yellow card) 38'; S. Rana (yellow card) 65'	Stadium: Bashundhara Kings Arena; Referee: Jashim Akhter

24 January 2025 9	Dhaka Wanderers Club	0–5	Bashundhara Kings	Gazipur
14:45 BST (UTC+6)	Nazmul (yellow card) 21'; Md Shawon (yellow card) 54'; Shakib Biswas (yellow card) 74'	Report	Fernandes 11'; Sohel 29'; Topu 38'; Saad (yellow card) 56'; Rakib 66'; Figueira 75'	Stadium: Shaheed Barkat Stadium; Referee: Taposh Roy

22 February 2025 10	Chittagong Abahani	0–2	Bashundhara Kings	Mymensingh
15:00 BST (UTC+6)	Md Akmol Hossan Noyon (yellow card) 10'; Sohanur Rahman (yellow card) 90+4'	Report	Foysal 20'; Figueira 30' (pen.)	Stadium: Rafiq Uddin Bhuiyan Stadium; Referee: Mohammed Nasiruddin

12 April 2025 11	Bashundhara Kings	1–2	Mohammedan SC	Dhaka
17:30 BST (UTC+6)	Rakib 25'; Rimon (yellow card) 15' (yellow-red card) 49'; Sohel (yellow card) 90'	Report	Arif Hossain (yellow card) 2'; Souleymane 19', 86' (yellow card) 26'	Stadium: Bashundhara Kings Arena; Referee: Md Alamgir Sarker

26 April 2025 12	Rahmatganj MFS	0–0	Bashundhara Kings	Munshigonj
15:30 BST (UTC+6)	M. Oshie (yellow card) 34'; M. Royal (yellow card) 87'	Report		Stadium: Shaheed Bir Sreshtho Flight Lieutenant Matiur Rahman Stadium; Referee: Anisur Rahman Sagor

2 May 2025 13	Bashundhara Kings	2–0	Abahani Limited Dhaka	Dhaka
19:30 BST (UTC+6)	Fahim 16', 49'; Rimon (yellow card) 45+1'; Sohel (yellow card) 90+2' (red card) 90+9'; Saad (red card) 90+9'; Mehedi (yellow card) 90+9'	Report	Shahin (red card) 90+9'	Stadium: Bashundhara Kings Arena; Referee: Bhubon Mohon Tarafder

9 May 2025 14	Brothers Union	0–0	Bashundhara Kings	Munshiganj
16:00 BST (UTC+6)	S. Tripura (yellow card) 21'; Sazzad (yellow card) 77'; Mfon (yellow card) 89'	Report	Md Yousuf Ali (yellow card) 24'; Sohel Jr (yellow card) 63'	Stadium: Shaheed Bir Sreshtho Flight Lieutenant Matiur Rahman Stadium; Referee: Sabuj Kumar Das

16 May 2025 15	Bashundhara Kings	0–1	Bangladesh Police FC	Dhaka
18:00 BST (UTC+6)	F. Fahim (yellow card) 70'	Report	S. Kirmane (yellow card) 10'; D. Roy 50'; Md Anik Hossain 71'	Stadium: Bashundhara Kings Arena; Referee: Mohamad Alamgir Sarkar

20 May 2025 16	Fakirerpool YMC	0–7	Bashundhara Kings	Gazipur
16:00 BST (UTC+6)	Shanto Tudo 22'; Mohamed Fofana 52'; Ben Ibrahim Ouattara (yellow card) 57'	Report	Rakib 23', 68', 77', 88'; Asror Gofurov 36'; Fahim 38'; Rafiqul 47'; Daciel Santos (yellow card) 57'; Sohel (yellow card) 78'	Stadium: Shaheed Barkat Stadium; Referee: Nazmul Huda

24 May 2025 17	Bashundhara Kings	1–1	Fortis FC	Dhaka
18:00 BST (UTC+6)	Fahim (yellow card) 24'; Mojibur (yellow card) 43'; Sohel (yellow card) 57'; Morsalin 80'	Report	Essa Jallow (yellow card) 20'; Abdullah 67' (yellow card) 68'	Stadium: Bashundhara Kings Arena; Referee: Jashim Akhter

27 May 2025 18	Bashundhara Kings	5–3	Dhaka Wanderers Club	Dhaka
16:45 BST (UTC+6)	Rakib 41'; Morsalin (yellow card) 37' (goal) 42', 45+5', 68'; Md Rabby 81'; Md Yousuf Ali (yellow card) 86'	Report	Sadik Ahmed 45'; Shahidul Islam 49'; Nazmul (yellow card) 65'; Mohammad Manzurul Karim 90+4'	Stadium: Bashundhara Kings Arena; Referee: Abul Kalam Rumon

=== Bangladesh Challenge Cup ===
==== Match ====
22 November 2024	Bashundhara Kings	3–1	Mohammedan SC	Dhaka
17:00 BST (UTC+6)	Topu 73'; Fahim 81'; Miguel 90+7'	Report	Diabate 7'	Stadium: Bashundhara Kings Arena; Referee: Virendra Rai (Bhutan)

=== Federation Cup (Bangladesh) ===
==== Group A ====
Pos	Team	Pld	W	D	L	GF	GA	GD	Pts	Qualification
1	Bashundhara Kings	4	3	0	1	9	4	+5	9	Qualified for QRF 1
2	Brothers Union	4	2	1	1	9	1	+8	7	Advanced to QRF 2
3	Fortis	4	2	1	1	5	1	+4	7	
4	Bangladesh Police	4	1	2	1	4	4	0	5	
5	Dhaka Wanderers	4	0	0	4	1	18	−17	0	

Source: Soccerway
Rules for classification: Group stages tiebreakers

3 December 2024	Bashundhara Kings	1–0	Brothers Union	Cumilla
14:30 BST (UTC+6)	Topu 69'	Report		Stadium: Shaheed Dhirendranath Datta Stadium; Referee: Golam Mourshed Chowdhury Nayon

17 December 2024	Bashundhara Kings	0–2	Fortis FC	Dhaka
14:30 BST (UTC+6)		Report	Jasur Jumaev 72'; Abdullah 80'	Stadium: Bashundhara Kings Arena; Referee: Md Alamgir Sarker

31 December 2024	Bangladesh Police FC	2–3	Bashundhara Kings	Dhaka
14:30 BST (UTC+6)	Al Amin 7', 54'	Report	Topu 6'; Miguel 10'; Fernandes 53'	Stadium: Bashundhara Kings Arena; Referee: Jasim Akhter

28 January 2025	Bashundhara Kings	5–0	Dhaka Wanderers	Cumilla
14:45 BST (UTC+6)	Miguel 18'; Sohel Sr. 40'; Rasel 55' (o.g.); Sohel Jr. 70'; Topu 77'	Report		Stadium: Shaheed Dhirendranath Datta Stadium; Referee: Bhubon Mohon Torafder

==== Qualification round ====
8 April 2025	Bashundhara Kings	1–1 (a.e.t.) (2–4 p)	Dhaka Abahani	Cumilla
14:45 BST (UTC+6)	Jony 57'	Report	Akash 84'	Stadium: Shaheed Dhirendranath Datta Stadium; Referee: Md Symoon Hasan Sany
	Penalties
	Fernandes (penalty scored); Morsalin (penalty scored); Rahul (penalty missed); Daciel (penalty missed)		(penalty missed) Jafar; (penalty scored) Augusto; (penalty scored) Emeka; (penalty scored) Sabuz; (penalty scored) Ibrahim

15 April 2025	Bashundhara Kings	2–1 (a.e.t.)	Rahmatganj MFS	Dhaka
14:45 BST (UTC+6)	Rakib 82'; Md Insan Hossain 113'	Report	Solomon King Kanform 75'	Stadium: Bashundhara Kings Arena; Referee: Md Jalal Uddin

==== Final ====
22 & 29 April 2025 (Note: The final match was held on 22 April 2025, at 2:45 PM. But later, the match was temporarily suspended due to excessive rain and poor lighting at the end. The remainder of the match was later moved to 3:00 PM on 29 April 2025.)	Dhaka Abahani	1–1 (Note: The match was temporarily suspended due to poor lighting.) (a.e.t.) (3–5 p)	Bashundhara Kings	Mymensingh
15:00 (Rescheduled) (Note: The original time of this match was 14:45 UTC on April 22.)	Ibrahim 15'	Report	Lescano 6'	Stadium: Rafiq Uddin Bhuiyan Stadium; Referee: Saymoon Hasan Sany
	Penalties
	Augusto (penalty scored); Emeka (penalty missed); Sabuz (penalty scored); Mirajul (penalty scored)		(penalty scored) Fernandez; (penalty scored) Morsalin; (penalty scored) Md Insan Hossain; (penalty scored) Topu; (penalty scored) Daciel

=== AFC Challenge League ===
==== Group A ====
Pos	Team	Pld	W	D	L	GF	GA	GD	Pts	Qualification	EAB	NJM	PAR	BSK
1	(India) East Bengal	3	2	1	0	9	4	+5	7	Advance to Quarter-finals		3–2	2–2	
2	(Lebanon) Nejmeh	3	2	0	1	5	4	+1	6					1–0
3	(Bhutan) Paro (H)	3	1	1	1	5	5	0	4			1–2		
4	(Bangladesh) Bashundhara Kings	3	0	0	3	1	7	−6	0		0–4		1–2	

Source: AFC
Rules for classification: Group stage tiebreakers
(H) Hosts

26 October 2024	Nejmeh (Lebanon)	1–0	(Bangladesh) Bashundhara Kings	Changlimithang Stadium, Thimphu, Bhutan
21:00 BST (UTC+6)	Saad 49' (o.g.)	Report		Attendance: 300; Referee: Jin Jingyuan (China)

29 October 2024	Bashundhara Kings (Bangladesh)	0–4	(India) East Bengal	Changlimithang Stadium, Thimphu, Bhutan
21:00 BST (UTC+6)		Report	Diamantakos 1'; Souvik 20'; Nandhakumar 26'; Anwar 33'	Attendance: 200; Referee: Mohammad Deham (Bahrain)

1 November 2024	Bashundhara Kings (Bangladesh)	1–2	(Bhutan) Paro	Changlimithang Stadium, Thimphu, Bhutan
21:00 BST (UTC+6)	Gryshyn 12'	Report	Wangdi 23'; Jumayev 55' (o.g.)	Attendance: 869; Referee: Mohammad Mofeed Naser Ghabayen (Jordan)

== Statistics ==
As of 27 May 2025

Rank	Player	Position	Total	BPL	Federation Cup	Challenge League	Challenge Cup
1	(Bangladesh) Rakib Hossain	MF	12	11	1	0	0
2	(Brazil) Miguel Figueira	MF	8	5	2	0	1
3	(Bangladesh) Foysal Ahmed Fahim	MF	7	6	0	0	1
3	(Bangladesh) Topu Barman	DF	7	3	3	0	1
3	(Brazil) Jonathan Fernandes	MF	6	5	1	0	0
4	(Bangladesh) Shekh Morsalin	FW	4	4	0	0	0
4	(Bangladesh) Mojibur Rahman Jony	MF	4	3	1	0	0
5	(Bangladesh) Sohel Rana	MF	3	2	1	0	0
6	(Bangladesh) Rafiqul Islam	MF	2	2	0	0	0
6	(France) Jared Khasa	MF	2	2	0	0	0
7	Md Rabby Hossen Rahul	MF	1	1	0	0	0
7	Md Insan Hossain	DF	1	0	1	0	0
7	Sohel Rana Jr	MF	1	0	1	0	0
7	(Argentina) Juan Lescano	FW	1	0	1	0	0
7	(Uzbekistan) Asror Gafurov	MF	1	1	0	0	0
7	(Ukraine) Valeriy Hryshyn	FW	1	0	0	1	0
Total			61	45	12	1	3
