= 2025–26 Bashundhara Kings season =

Bashundhara Kings 2025–26 football season

Bashundhara Kings
2025–26 season
- Owner: Bashundhara Group
- President: Imrul Hassan
- Head coach: Bayazid Alam Zubair Nipu
- Stadium: Bashundhara Kings Arena
- Football League: Champions
- Federation Cup: Champions
- AFC Challenge League: Group stage
- Challenge Cup: Champions
- Top goalscorer: League: Dorielton (20 goals); All: Dorielton (34 goals)
- Biggest win: 4–1 Vs Mohahmmedan SC (Neutral); Challenge Cup (19 September 2025); 5–0 Vs Rahmatganj MFS (Home); Football League (29 November 2025); 5–0 Vs Arambagh KS (Neutral); Federation Cup (7 April 2026)
- Biggest defeat: 0–3 Vs (Lebanon) Al-Ansar (Neutral); Challenge League (28 October 2025)
| Home colours | Away colours |

The 2025–26 season was the Bashundhara Kings's 13th competitive professional season since its creation in 2013, and 8th consecutive season in Bangladesh Football League, country's top-tier football league. In addition to the domestic league, Bashundhara Kings participated in this season's edition of AFC Challenge League, Federation Cup and Challenge Cup.

== Players ==
Players and squad numbers last updated on 15 August 2025.
Note: Flags indicate national team as has been defined under FIFA eligibility rules. Players may hold more than one non-FIFA nationality.

| No. | Nat. | Player | Position(s) | Date Of Birth | Year Signed | Previous club |
Goalkeepers
| 1 | (Bangladesh) | Anisur Rahman Zico (Vice-captain) | GK | 10 August 1997 (age 29) | 2018 | Saif Sporting Club |
| 27 | (Bangladesh) | Shahin Molla | GK | | 2024 | |
| 30 | (Bangladesh) | Mehedi Hasan | GK | 2 January 2004 (age 22) | 2020 | Youth team |
| 50 | (Bangladesh) | Mehedi Hasan Srabon | GK | 12 August 2005 (age 21) | 2023 | Muktijoddha SKC |
Defenders
| 2 | (Nigeria) | Emmanuel Tony Agbaji | RB / CB | 21 November 1992 (age 33) | 2025 | Mohammedan SC |
| 4 | (Bangladesh) | Topu Barman (Captain) | CB | 20 December 1994 (age 31) | 2019 | Abahani Ltd. Dhaka |
| 5 | (Bangladesh) | Tanvir Hossain | CB | 13 December 2003 (age 22) | 2025 | Rahmatganj MFS |
| 12 | (Bangladesh) | Bishwanath Ghosh | RB / CB | 30 May 1999 (age 27) | 2019 | Sheikh Russel KC |
| 15 | (Bangladesh) | Md Taj Uddin | RB | 18 July 2002 (age 24) | 2025 | Rahmatganj MFS |
| 18 | (Bangladesh) | Mohammed Jahid Hossen | LB | 1 June 2002 (age 24) | 2023 | Mohammedan SC |
| 22 | (Bangladesh) | Md Saad Uddin | RB / RM / RW | 1 September 1998 (age 28) | 2022 | Sheikh Russel KC |
| 28 | (Bangladesh) | Yousuf Ali | | | 2024 | |
| 71 | (Bangladesh) | Rimon Hossain | LB / LM | 1 July 2005 (age 21) | 2019 | Arambagh FA |
Midfielders
| 6 | (Bangladesh) | Md Sohel Rana | DM / CM / AM | 1 June 1996 (age 30) | 2023 | Abahani Ltd. Dhaka |
| 8 | (Bangladesh) | Mohammad Ridoy | AM | 22 April 2000 (age 26) | 2025 | Abahani Ltd. Dhaka |
| 14 | (Bangladesh) | Chandon Roy | DM / CM | 4 May 2007 (age 19) | 2024 | Sheikh Russel KC |
| 17 | (Bangladesh) | Sohel Rana | CM / DM / AM | 27 March 1995 (age 31) | 2021 | Abahani Ltd. Dhaka |
| 29 | (Bangladesh) | Mohsin Ahmed | | | 2024 | |
| 37 | (Bangladesh) | Mojibur Rahman Jony | CM / AM | 1 January 2005 (age 21) | 2023 | Fortis FC |
| 44 | (Bangladesh) | Md Sabbir Hossain | CM / DM / LB | 28 June 2003 (age 23) | 2022 | Swadhinata KS |
| 47 | (Bangladesh) | Akmol Hossan Noyon | | | 2024 | |
| | (Bangladesh) | Samuel Raksam | CM / DM | 10 November 2007 (age 18) | 2025 | BFF Elite Football Academy |
| | (Bangladesh) | Using Marma | | 15 June 2007 (age 19) | 2025 | Youth team |
Forwards
| 7 | (Bangladesh) | Rakib Hossain | RW / SS | 18 November 1998 (age 27) | 2022 | Abahani Ltd. Dhaka |
| 9 | (Brazil) | Dorielton Gomes | CF | 7 March 1990 (age 36) | 2025 | (India) Odisha FC |
| 10 | (Bangladesh) | Nabib Newaj Jibon | CF / AM | 7 August 1990 (age 36) | 2025 | Rahmatganj MFS |
| 11 | (Bangladesh) | Foysal Ahmed Fahim | RW / CF | 24 February 2002 (age 24) | 2024 | Sheikh Jamal DC |
| 19 | (Bangladesh) | Shahriar Emon | LW / RW | 7 March 2001 (age 25) | 2025 | Abahani Ltd. Dhaka |
| 37 | (Nigeria) | Emmanuel Sunday | LW / RW | 25 February 1992 (age 34) | 2025 | Mohammedan SC |

== Transfers ==
=== In ===
| No. | Pos | Player | Previous club | Fee | Date | Source |
|---|---|---|---|---|---|---|
| 8 | MF | (Bangladesh) Samuel Raksam | (Bangladesh) BFF Elite Football Academy | Free Transfer | 20 June 2025 | |
| 9 | FW | (Bangladesh) Shahriar Emon | (Bangladesh) Dhaka Abahani | Free Transfer | 16 June 2025 | |
| 18 | DF | (Bangladesh) Tanvir Hossain | (Bangladesh) Rahmatganj MFS | Free Transfer | 16 July 2025 | |
| 10 | FW | (Bangladesh) Nabib Newaj Jibon | (Bangladesh) Rahmatganj MFS | Free Transfer | 16 July 2025 | |
| 37 | FW | (Nigeria) Emmanuel Sunday | (Bangladesh) Mohammedan SC | Free Transfer | 25 July 2025 | |
| 15 | DF | (Bangladesh) Md Taj Uddin | (Bangladesh) Rahmatganj MFS | Free Transfer | 26 July 2025 | |
| 2 | DF | (Nigeria) Emmanuel Tony Agbaji | (Bangladesh) Mohammedan SC | Free Transfer | 28 July 2025 | |
| 9 | FW | (Brazil) Dorielton | (India) Odisha FC (Indian Super League) | Free Transfer | 28 July 2025 | |
| 80 | FW | (Brazil) Raphael Augusto | (Bangladesh) Dhaka Abahani | Free Transfer | 28 July 2025 | |
| 88 | MF | (Bangladesh) (England) Cuba Mitchell | (England) Sunderland AFC (Premier League) | Free Transfer | 28 July 2025 | |
| 8 | MF | (Bangladesh) Mohammad Ridoy | (Bangladesh) Dhaka Abahani | Free Transfer | 29 July 2025 | |

=== Out ===
| No. | Pos | Player | Moved to | Fee | Date | Source |
|---|---|---|---|---|---|---|
| 33 | MF | (Bangladesh) Shekh Morsalin | (Bangladesh) Dhaka Abahani | Free Transfer | 12 July 2025 | |
| 8 | MF | (Brazil) Miguel Figueira | (India) East Bengal (Indian Super League) | Free Transfer | 18 July 2025 | |
| 19 | FW | (Bangladesh) Md Rabby Hossen Rahul | Bangladesh Police FC | Loan Transfer | 21 July 2025 | |
| 77 | MF | (Uzbekistan) Asror Gafurov | FC Qizilqum (Uzbekistan Super League) | Free Transfer | 30 July 2025 | |
| 3 | DF | (Brazil) Daciel | Tai Po FC (Hong Kong Premier League) | Free Transfer | 30 July 2025 | |
| 23 | MF | (Bangladesh) Rafiqul Islam | (Bangladesh) Rahmatganj MFS | Free Transfer | 31 July 2025 | |
| 95 | MF | (Brazil) Jonathan Fernandes | Unknown | Released | 1 August 2025 | |
| 27 | FW | (Ghana) Evans Etti | Free agent | Released | 1 August 2025 | |
| 5 | DF | (Bangladesh) Tutul Hossain Badsha | (Bangladesh) Brothers Union | Free Transfer | 1 August 2025 | |
| 99 | FW | (Argentina) Juan Lescano | (Finland) FC Haka (Veikkausliiga) | Free Transfer | 19 August 2025 | |
| 40 | DF | (Bangladesh) Tariq Kazi | Unknown | Released | 17 October 2025 | |
| 88 | MF | (Bangladesh) Cuba Raul Mitchell | (England) Gloucester City A.F.C. | Released | 3 January 2026 | |
| 80 | MF | (Brazil) Raphael Augusto | (Brazil) Dibros FC | Free Transfer | 14 January 2026 | |

== Pre-season and friendlies ==
| 6 August 2025 | Bashundhara Kings | 2–0 | Abahani Limited Dhaka | Dhaka |
| 17:00 BST (UTC+6) | Fahim 16', 72' | | | Stadium: Bashundhara Kings Arena; Referee: Anisur Rahman Sagor |

| 23 August 2025 | Bashundhara Kings | 2–0 | Bangladesh Police FC | Dhaka |
| 17:45 BST (UTC+6) | C. Mitchell ?; Topu ? | | | Stadium: Bashundhara Kings Arena; Referee: Md Monir Dhali |

| 30 August 2025 | Bashundhara Kings | 3–1 | Bangladesh Police FC | Dhaka |
| 17:00 BST (UTC+6) | | Report | | Stadium: Bashundhara Kings; Referee: Bituraj Barua |

== Competitions ==
Win Draw Loss Fixtures

=== Overall ===
| Competition | First match | Last match | Final Position |
|---|---|---|---|
| BFL | 26 September 2025 | 23 May 2026 | Champions |
| AFC Challenge League | 12 August 2025 | 31 October 2025 | Group stage |
| Federation Cup | 23 September 2025 | 20 May 2026 | Champions |
| Challenge Cup | 19 September 2025 | 19 September 2025 | Champions |

=== Overview ===
| Competition | Record | | | | | | | |
| Competition | Pld | W | D | L | GF | GA | GD | Win % |
|---|---|---|---|---|---|---|---|---|
| BFL | 18 | 12 | 5 | 1 | 42 | 18 | +24 | 66.67 |
| AFC Challenge League | 4 | 1 | 0 | 3 | 3 | 8 | −5 | 25.00 |
| Federation Cup | 6 | 4 | 2 | 0 | 18 | 4 | +14 | 66.67 |
| Challenge Cup | 1 | 1 | 0 | 0 | 4 | 1 | +3 | 100.00 |
| Total | 29 | 18 | 7 | 4 | 67 | 31 | +36 | 62.07 |

Source: Competitions

== Competitions ==
=== Premier League ===
==== League table ====
| Pos | Team | Pld | W | D | L | GF | GA | GD | Pts | Qualification or relegation |
|---|---|---|---|---|---|---|---|---|---|---|
| 1 | Bashundhara Kings (Note: Bashundhara Kings and Dhaka Abahani will not be able to participate in the AFC Challenge League due to the risk of FIFA sanctions and the lack of an AFC club license.) (C) | 18 | 12 | 5 | 1 | 42 | 18 | +24 | 41 | |
| 2 | Dhaka Abahani | 18 | 11 | 4 | 3 | 37 | 15 | +22 | 37 | |
| 3 | Fortis | 18 | 10 | 5 | 3 | 31 | 13 | +18 | 35 | Qualification for the AFC; Challenge League qualifying stage |
| 4 | Bangladesh Police | 18 | 6 | 9 | 3 | 19 | 15 | +4 | 27 | Qualification for the AFC; Challenge League qualifying stage |
| 5 | Mohammedan | 18 | 6 | 5 | 7 | 27 | 20 | +7 | 23 | |

Source: Soccerway
Rules for classification: 1) Points; 2) Goal difference; 3) Number of goals scored.
(C) Champion

==== Results summary ====
| Overall | | | | | | | | Home | | | | | | Away | | | | | |
| Pld | W | D | L | GF | GA | GD | Pts | W | D | L | GF | GA | GD | W | D | L | GF | GA | GD |
|---|---|---|---|---|---|---|---|---|---|---|---|---|---|---|---|---|---|---|---|
| 18 | 12 | 5 | 1 | 42 | 18 | +24 | 41 | 8 | 2 | 0 | 24 | 8 | +16 | 4 | 3 | 1 | 18 | 10 | +8 |

Source: Soccerway

==== Results by round ====
| Round | 1 | 2 | 3 | 4 | 5 | 6 | 7 | 8 | 9 | 10 | 11 | 12 | 13 | 14 | 15 | 16 | 17 | 18 |
|---|---|---|---|---|---|---|---|---|---|---|---|---|---|---|---|---|---|---|
| Ground | A | H | A | H | A | A | A | H | A | H | H | H | A | H | A | H | A | H |
| Result | D | W | W | W | W | W | L | D | D | W | W | W | D | W | W | W | W | W |
| Position | 3 | 2 | 1 | 1 | 1 | 1 | 1 | 1 | 1 | 1 | 1 | 1 | 1 | 1 | 1 | 1 | 1 | 1 |

Source: Matches
A = Away; H = Home; W = Win; D = Draw; L = Loss; P = Postponed

==== Matches ====
| 27 September 2025 1 | PWD SC | 2–2 | Bashundhara Kings | Gazipur |
| 14:45 BST (UTC+6) | A. Turaev 68' (pen.); Sohanur Rahman 70'; A. Akash 72' | Report | Dorielton 13'; F. Fahim 45+2'; S. Uddin (yellow card) 79' | Stadium: Shaheed Barkat Stadium; Referee: Md Alamgir Sarker |

| 20 October 2025 | Bashundhara Kings | 2–1 | Fortis FC | Dhaka |
| 17:30 BST (UTC+6) | Dorielton 2'; F. Fahim 60'; M. Srabon (yellow card) 66' | Report | Mohammad Mona (yellow card) 57'; P. Babou (yellow card) 90+4'; O. Okafor 90+5' | Stadium: Bashundhara Kings Arena; Referee: Bhubon Mohon Tarafder |

| 24 November 2025 3 | Arambagh KS | 0–2 | Bashundhara Kings | Manikganj |
| 14:45 BST (UTC+6) | B. Quansah (yellow card) 19' | Report | Dorielton 75' (pen.), 82' | Stadium: Shaheed Miraj–Tapan Stadium; Referee: Jashim Akther |

| 29 November 2025 4 | Bashundhara Kings | 4–0 | Rahmatganj MFS | Dhaka |
| 17:30 BST (UTC+6) | R. Hossain 27'; F. Fahim 45'; M. Ridoy (yellow card) 61'; T. Barman 71'; E. Agbaji 75'; Md Yousuf Ali (yellow card) 77'; Dorielton 78' | Report | S. Ahammad (yellow card) 58' | Stadium: Bashundhara Kings Arena; Referee: TBC |

| 5 December 2025 5 | Brothers Union | 1–5 | Bashundhara Kings | Munshiganj |
| 14:45 BST (UTC+6) | A. Bista (yellow card) 8'; J. Bhuyan (yellow card) 8'; Mohamed Hossain Nira 90' | Report | . Hossain (yellow card) 14'; Dorielton 41', 77'; F. Fahim 45+1'; S. Emmanuel 50'; S. Rana 54'; S. Uddin (yellow card) 71' | Stadium: Bir Sreshtho Matiur Rahman Stadium; Referee: Md Anisur Rahman |

| 12 December 2025 6 | Bashundhara Kings | 2–0 | Mohammedan SC | Dhaka |
| 17:30 BST (UTC+6) | R. Hossain 15'; Md Yousuf Ali (yellow card) 20'; S. Uddin (yellow card) 22'; Dorielton 90+1' | Report | M. Muzaffarov (red card) 90+4' | Stadium: Bashundhara Kings Arena; Referee: Mohammad Alamgir Sarker |

| 20 December 2025 7 | Bangladesh Police FC | 2–1 | Bashundhara Kings | Gazipur |
| 14:30 BST (UTC+6) | R. Rahul 3'; M. Mollah (yellow card) 10'; A. Ghalan (yellow card) 89'; S. Kagimu 90+2' (yellow card) 90+2' | Report | M. Ridoy (yellow card) 30'; F. Fahim 33' | Stadium: Shaheed Barkat Stadium; Referee: Md Jalal Uddin |

| 27 December 2025 8 | Bashundhara Kings | 2–2 | Abahani Limited Dhaka | Dhaka |
| 17:30 BST (UTC+6) | F. Fahim (yellow card) 2'; R. Hasan 5' (yellow card) 89'; S. Emmanuel 16'; Dorielton (yellow card) 39'; R. Augusto (yellow card) 75' | Report | S. Diabate 19', 51' (penalty missed) 72'; S. Morsalin (yellow card) 79'; M. Islam (yellow card) 81'; S. Hossain (yellow card) 90+2' | Stadium: Bashundhara Kings Arena; Referee: Md Saymoon Hasan Sany |

| 3 January 2026 9 | Fakirerpool YMC | 3–3 | Bashundhara Kings | Manikganj |
| 14:30 BST (UTC+6) | Nazrul Islam Sumon (yellow card) 21'; Md Jahid Hossain 77'; Md Irfan Hossain 84'; Ben Ibrahim Ouattara 90' | Report | Raphael 23'; Dorielton 25', 29' | Stadium: Shaheed Miraj–Tapan Stadium; Referee: Md Jashim Akther |

| 6 March 2026 10 | Bashundhara Kings | 2–0 | PWD Sports Club | Dhaka |
| 14:45 BST (UTC+6) | S. Uddin (yellow card) 8'; M.Ridoy 22'; B. Ghosh (yellow card) 49'; MS Rana (yellow card) 90+4'; S. Emmanuel 90+5' | Report | Mohammed Ratul (yellow card) 55' | Stadium: Bashundhara Kings Arena; Referee: SM Jashim Akhter |

| 14 March 2026 11 | Fortis FC | 2–3 | Bashundhara Kings | Dhaka |
| 14:45 BST (UTC+6) | O. Okafor 19'; Abdullah Omar Sajib (yellow card) 28'; A. Tamang 75'; Mohammad Rasel Hossain (yellow card) 89' | Report | R. Hossain (yellow card) 21'; Dorielton 26' (pen.), 52', 78'; S. Rana (yellow card) 45+3'; B. Ghosh (yellow card) 47'; S. Uddin (yellow card) 71' | Stadium: Bashundhara Kings Arena; Referee: Md Alamgir Sarker |

| 11 April 2026 12 | Bashundhara Kings | 2–1 | Arambagh KS | Dhaka |
| 15:30 BST (UTC+6) | Dorielton 25'; S. Emmanuel 28' | Report | Shadrach Lantei-Mills (yellow card) 40' (goal) 64'; Md Ariful Islam Sakhawat (yellow card) 90+2' | Stadium: Bashundhara Kings Arena; Referee: Md Nazmul Huda |

| 17 April 2026 13 | Rahmatganj MFS | 1–1 | Bashundhara Kings | Munshiganj |
| 15:30 BST (UTC+6) | Md Sayde (yellow card) 18'; A. Limbu (yellow card) 38' (yellow-red card) 81'; E. Boateng 42' | Report | S. Emon 13'; B. Ghosh (yellow card) 31' (yellow-red card) 67'; R. Hossain (yellow card) 67' | Stadium: Bir Sreshtho Matiur Rahman Stadium; Referee: Md Alamgir Sarker |

| 25 April 2026 14 | Bashundhara Kings | 1–0 | Brothers Union | Dhaka |
| 15:30 BST (UTC+6) | S. Rana (yellow card) 12'; Dorielton 22' | Report | Mouhamed Becaye Diarra (yellow card) 81' | Stadium: Bashundhara Kings Arena; Referee: Md Anisur Rahman |

| 30 April 2026 15 | Mohammedan SC | 1–2 | Bashundhara Kings | Comilla |
| 15:30 BST (UTC+6) | M. Muzaffarov 28'; Arif Hossain (yellow card) 34' | Report | S. Rana (yellow card) 37'; Abu Sufian Yousuf Sifat (yellow card) 45+1'; B. Ghosh (yellow card) 45+3'; F. Fahim 45+6'; Dorielton 69' | Stadium: Shaheed Dhirendranath Datta Stadium; Referee: Md Jashim Akhter |

| 8 May 2026 16 | Bashundhara Kings | 1–1 | Bangladesh Police FC | Dhaka |
| 17:30 BST (UTC+6) | Dori 35'; (yellow card) 45+2'; R. Hossain (yellow card) 45' (red card) 90+66'; S. Rana (yellow card) 53'; S. Uddin (yellow card) 90+72' | Report | M. Molla (yellow card) 6'; P. Henrique 53' (yellow card) 54' (yellow-red card) 63'; Shamim Ahmed (yellow card) 90+74' | Stadium: Bashundhara Kings Arena; Referee: Md Nasrir Uddin |

| 15 May 2026 17 | Abahani Limited Dhaka | 0–2 | Bashundhara Kings | Cumilla |
| 15:45 BST (UTC+6) | K. Islam (yellow card) 21'; Y. Khan (yellow card) 39'; S. Diabate (yellow card) 52' | Report | T. Uddin (yellow card) 16'; Dori 75'; S. Rana 77' | Stadium: Shaheed Dhirendranath Datta Stadium; Referee: Md Anisur Rahman |

| 23 May 2026 18 | Bashundhara Kings | 4–1 | Fakirerpool YMC | Dhaka |
| 15:45 BST (UTC+6) | Dorielton 36', 74'; M. Jony 39' (yellow card) 40'; S. Emon 62' | Report | Ouattara Ben Ibrahim 28' | Stadium: Bashundhara Kings Arena; Referee: Anisur Rahman Sagor |

=== Group B ===
| Pos | Team | Pld | W | D | L | GF | GA | GD | Pts | Qualification |
|---|---|---|---|---|---|---|---|---|---|---|
| 1 | Bashundhara Kings | 4 | 2 | 2 | 0 | 10 | 2 | +8 | 8 | Qualified for QRF 1 |
| 2 | Mohammedan SC | 4 | 2 | 2 | 0 | 8 | 3 | +5 | 8 | Advanced to QRF 2 |
| 3 | Bangladesh Police | 4 | 2 | 0 | 2 | 6 | 8 | −2 | 6 | |
| 4 | Fortis FC | 4 | 1 | 2 | 1 | 7 | 4 | +3 | 5 | |
| 5 | Arambagh KS | 4 | 0 | 0 | 4 | 0 | 14 | −14 | 0 | |

Source: Sofascore

| 23 September 2025 | Bashundhara Kings | 1–1 | Fortis FC | Dhaka |
| 14:45 BST (UTC+6) | Dorielton 49' | Report | T. Kazi 85' (o.g.) | Stadium: Bashundhara Kings Arena; Referee: Md Nasir Uddin |

| 23 December 2025 | Bashundhara Kings | 0–0 | Mohammedan SC | Comilla |
| 14:30 BST (UTC+6) | | Report | | Stadium: Shaheed Dhirendranath Datta Stadium; Referee: Md Nasrin Uddin |

| 7 April 2026 | Arambagh KS | 0–5 | Bashundhara Kings | Comilla |
| 14:30 BST (UTC+6) | | Report | Dorielton 16', 55'; F. Fahim 23'; S. Emmanuel 32'; S. Rana 67' | Stadium: Shaheed Dhirendranath Datta Stadium; Referee: Md Jalal Uddin |

| 21 April 2026 | Bangladesh Police FC | 1–4 | Bashundhara Kings | Dhaka |
| 14:45 BST (UTC+6) | M. Bablu 90+2' | Report | Dorielton 45+8', 52', 83', 88' | Stadium: Bashundhara Kings Arena; Referee: Mahmud Zamal Faruqee Nahid |

==== Qualification round ====
| 5 May 2026 | Brothers Union | 0–4 | Bashundhara Kings | Dhaka |
| 14:45 BST (UTC+6) | | Report | R. Hossain 3'; Dori 71', 73'; Md Sabbir Hossen 88' | Stadium: Bashundhara Kings Arena; Referee: Md Symoon Hasan Sany |

==== Final ====
| 20 May 2026 | Bashundhara Kings | 3–2 | Mohammedan SC | Dhaka |
| 17:40 BST (UTC+6) | Dorielton 9' (pen.), 49', 79' | Report | M. Muzaffarov 5'; Sourav Dewan 34' | Stadium: Bashundhara Kings Arena; Referee: Mahmud Zamal Faruqee Nahid |

== AFC Challenge League ==
=== Preliminary stage ===
| 12 August 2025 AFC CL PO | Karamah (Syria) | 0–1 | (Bangladesh) Bashundhara | Doha, Qatar (Note: Al-Karamah was played their home match at Suheim bin Hamad Stadium, Doha (Qatar), instead of their regular home stadium Khalid ibn al-Walid Stadium, Homs.) |
| 23:30 BST (UTC+6) | | AFC Report; GSA Report | Sunday 6' | Stadium: Suheim bin Hamad Stadium; Attendance: 2,667; Referee: Firdavs Norsafarov (Uzbekistan) |

=== Group stage ===
Group B

| Pos | Team | Pld | W | D | L | GF | GA | GD | Pts | Qualification | ALK | ALA | ASB | BSK |
|---|---|---|---|---|---|---|---|---|---|---|---|---|---|---|
| 1 | Al-Kuwait (H) | 3 | 2 | 1 | 0 | 6 | 3 | +3 | 7 | Advance to Quarter-finals | | 3–2 | 1–1 | 2–0 |
| 2 | (Lebanon) Al-Ansar | 3 | 2 | 0 | 1 | 7 | 4 | +3 | 6 | Advance to Quarter-finals | | | 2–1 | 3–0 |
| 3 | (Oman) Al-Seeb | 3 | 1 | 1 | 1 | 5 | 5 | 0 | 4 | | | | | 3–2 |
| 4 | (Bangladesh) Bashundhara Kings | 3 | 0 | 0 | 3 | 2 | 8 | −6 | 0 | | | | | |

Source: AFC
Rules for classification: Tiebreakers
(H) Hosts

=== Groups stage ===
| 25 October 2025 AFC CL GS | (Oman) Al Seeb | 3–2 | (Bangladesh) Bashundhara | Sulaibikhat, Kuwait |
| 19:00 BST (UTC+6) | Al-Rawahi 7'; Al-Aghbari 60'; Al-Muqbali 77' | AFC Report; GSA Report | Augusto 41'; Rakib 53' | Stadium: Jaber Al-Mubarak Al-Hamad Stadium; Attendance: 2,840; Referee: Wong Wai Lun (Hong Kong) |

| 28 October 2025 AFC CL GS | Bashundhara (Bangladesh) | 0–3 | (Lebanon) Al Ansar | Sulaibikhat, Kuwait |
| 20:00 BST (UTC+6) | | AFC Report; GSA Report | Abubakar Akuki 43'; Hichem Khalfallah 76' (pen.); Hebous 90+3' | Stadium: Jaber Al-Mubarak Al-Hamad Stadium; Attendance: 314; Referee: Khash-Erdene Bold (Mongolia) |

| 31 October 2025 AFC CL GS | Bashundhara (Bangladesh) | 0–2 | Al Kuwait | Sulaibikhat, Kuwait |
| 22:00 BST (UTC+6) | | AFC Report; GSA Report | Nasser 1'; Khenissi 45+3' | Stadium: Jaber Al-Mubarak Al-Hamad Stadium; Attendance: 1,971; Referee: Zayniddin Alimov (Kyrgyzstan) |

== Bangladesh Challenge Cup ==
| 19 September 2025 Bangladesh Challenge Cup Final | Mohammedan | 1–4 | Bashundhara Kings | Cumilla, Bangladesh |
| 14:30 BST (UTC+6) | M. Muzaffarov 15' (pen.) | Report | Dorielton 8' (pen.), 86'; R. Augusto 72'; S. Emmanuel 74' | Stadium: Shaheed Dhirendranath Datta Stadium; Referee: Md Saymoon Hasan Sany; Man of the Match: Raphael Augusto (Bashundhara Kings) |

== Statistics ==
=== Goalscorers ===
As of 23 May 2026

| Rank | Player | Position | Total | BFL | Federation Cup | Challenge League | Challenge Cup |
|---|---|---|---|---|---|---|---|
| 1 | (Brazil) Dorielton | FW | 34 | 20 | 12 | 0 | 2 |
| 2 | (Nigeria) Sunday Emmanuel | FW | 7 | 4 | 1 | 1 | 1 |
| 2 | (Bangladesh) Foysal Ahmed Fahim | FW | 7 | 6 | 1 | 0 | 0 |
| 3 | (Bangladesh) Rakib Hossain | MF | 5 | 3 | 1 | 1 | 0 |
| 4 | (Brazil) Raphael Augusto | MF | 3 | 1 | 0 | 1 | 1 |
| 5 | (Bangladesh) Shahriar Emon | MF | 2 | 2 | 0 | 0 | 0 |
| 5 | (Bangladesh) Sohel Rana | MF | 2 | 2 | 0 | 0 | 0 |
| 7 | (Bangladesh) Topu Barman | DF | 1 | 1 | 0 | 0 | 0 |
| 7 | (Bangladesh) Md Sabbir Hossen | MF | 1 | 0 | 1 | 0 | 0 |
| 7 | (Bangladesh) Mohammad Ridoy | MF | 1 | 1 | 0 | 0 | 0 |
| 7 | (Bangladesh) Sohel Rana | MF | 1 | 1 | 0 | 0 | 0 |
| 7 | (Bangladesh) Mojibur Rahman Jony | MF | 1 | 1 | 0 | 0 | 0 |
| 7 | (Nigeria) Emmanuel Tony Agbaji | DF | 1 | 1 | 0 | 0 | 0 |
| Total | | | 66 | 43 | 17 | 3 | 4 |
