= Nuruzzaman Nayan =

Bangladeshi association football player and coach

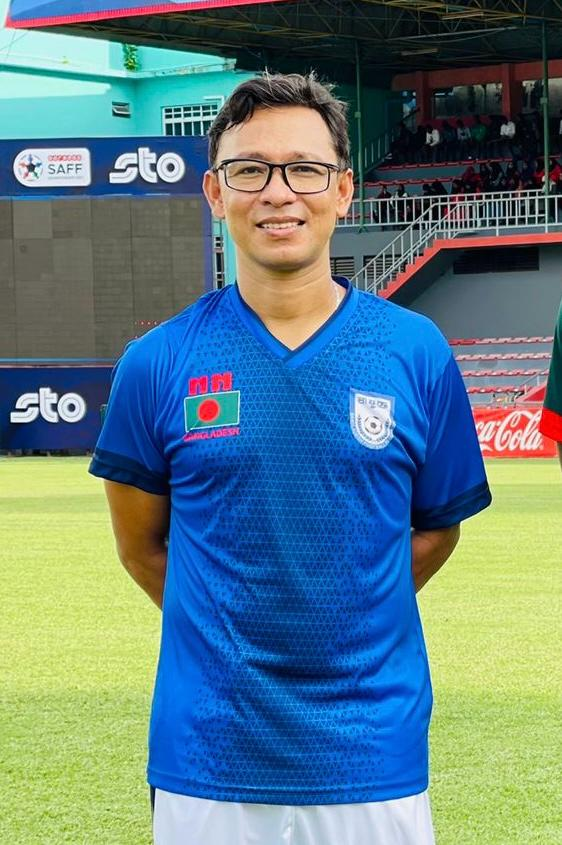
- Nayan in 2021 SAFF Championship National Football Stadium, Maldives

Personal information
- Full name: A. K. M. Nuruzzaman
- Date of birth: 20 January
- Place of birth: Netrokona, Bangladesh
- Height: 1.70 m (5 ft 7 in)
- Position: Goalkeeper

Team information
- Current team: City Club (football) (goalkeeping coach)

Youth career
- 1994–1995: Mirpur City Club

Senior career*
Years	Team	Apps	(Gls)
1997–1999	Mirpur Cholontika KC		
1999–2000	Dhanmondi Club		
2001–2002	Mirpur Cholontika KC		
2003	Sheikh Russel KC		
2004–2007	Fakirerpool YMC		
2007	Victoria SC		

International career^{‡}
2002	Bangladesh U20	0	(0)

Managerial career
- 2012: Bangladesh women (goalkeeping coach)
- 2012: Bangladesh U19 Women (goalkeeping coach)
- 2013: Abahani Limited Dhaka Women (head coach)
- 2014–2015: Dhaka Mohammedan (goalkeeping coach)
- 2015-2016: Bangladesh (goalkeeping coach)
- 2016–2017: Muktijoddha Sangsad KC (goalkeeping coach)
- 2017–2018: Chittagong Abahani (goalkeeping coach)
- 2018: Bangladesh (goalkeeping coach)
- 2018–2019: Muktijoddha Sangsad KC (goalkeeping coach)
- 2019–2026: Bashundhara Kings (goalkeeping coach)
- 2024-2026: Bangladesh (goalkeeping coach)
- 2026-current: City Club (goalkeeping coach)
- * Club domestic league appearances and goals as of 1 April 2021 ‡ National team caps and goals as of 1 April 2021

Nuruzzaman Nayan (Bengali: নুরুজ্জামান নয়ন) is a former Bangladeshi footballer as a goalkeeping coach of Bangladesh National team, current goalkeeper coach of City Club and the former goalkeeping coach of the Bashundhara Kings and football analysts.As the first-ever Bangladeshi goalkeeping coach, he has achieved Goalkeeping Level 1 in 2016 in Nepal, Goalkeeping Level 2 in 2019 in Australia, and obtained a Goalkeeping A Diploma in 2024 in Malaysia. This is the first time a goalkeeper coach from Bangladesh has received such a highest-level certificate. He was the goalkeeper coach of Bangladesh in the 2021 SAFF Championship.

He is regarded as the country's most qualified goalkeeping coach with several coaching licences. In 2016, he achieved AFC Goakeeping Level 1 Coaching Certificate as first Bangladeshi. He is also an AFC 'A' Coaching Licence holder and a coach instructor. Nayan is the former goalkeeping coach of both the Bangladesh men's football team and the Bangladesh women's football team. He played for more than ten years in domestic football.

== Coach education ==
- AFC Goalkeeping Coaching Tutors Course 2024

== Honours ==
=== Head coach ===
Abahani Limited Dhaka women's team

- Bangladesh Women's Football League: 2013–14

=== Goalkeeping coach ===
Bashundhara Kings

- Bangladesh Premier League: 2020-21
- Bangladesh Premier League: 2021-22
- Bangladesh Premier League: 2022-23
- Bangladesh Premier League: 2023-24
- Bangladesh Premier League: 2025-26
- Federation Cup: 2019–20
- Federation Cup: 2020–21
- Federation Cup: 2023–24
- Federation Cup: 2024–25

Federation Cup (Bangladesh) 2025–26

- Independence Cup: 2022
- Independence Cup: 2023
- Bangladesh Challenge Cup: 2024
- Bangladesh Challenge Cup: 2025

Dhaka Mohammedan SC

- Independence Cup: 2014

== Managerial statistics ==
Team	From	To	P	W	D	L	GS	GA	%W
Bangladesh football federation	May 2011	May 2012	61	48	11	2	150	33	78.69
Bangladesh women's national football team	2012	2012	33	22	7	4	80	23	66.67
Under 19 women's national team	2012	2012	73	45	12	16	130	61	61.64
Bangladesh National Team	2018	2018	30	23	4	3	81	31	76.67
Mohammedan SC	3 June 2014	26 August 2015	28	12	5	11	46	40	42.86
Bangladesh	24 November 2016	18 January 2018	6	3	1	2	9	9	50.00
Dhaka Abahani	8 April 2013	2 August 2013	59	22	11	26	82	83	37.29
Bangladesh U23 (interim)	25 September 2018	2 November 2028	3	0	0	3	0	10	0.00
Muktijudda Kc	25 October 2016	1 August 2016	28	7	11	10	39	46	25.00
Muktijudda Kc	2018	2018	33	22	7	4	80	23	66.67
Chittagong Abahani	2017	2017	8	3	2	3	13	15	37.50
Bangladesh National Team	2021	2021	61	48	11	2	150	33	78.69
Bangladesh women's national football team	2012	2012	33	22	7	4	80	23	66.67
Bangladesh National Football Team	2024	2024	33	22	7	4	80	23	66.67
Bangladesh National Football Team	2025	2025	33	22	7	4	80	23	66.67
Bangladesh National Football Team	2026	2026	33	22	7	4	80	23	66.67
Bashundhara Kings	1st October 2019	Present	0	0	0	0	0	0	—
