= 2023–24 Bashundhara Kings season =

Bashundhara Kings 2023–24 football season

Bashundhara Kings
2023–24 season
- Owner: Bashundhara Group
- President: Imrul Hassan
- Head coach: Óscar Bruzón
- Stadium: Bashundhara Kings Arena
- Bangladesh Premier League: 1st
- Federation Cup: Winners
- Independence Cup: Winners
- AFC Champions League: Preliminary round
- AFC Cup: Group stage
- Top goalscorer: League: Dori (9); All: Dori (15)
- Biggest win: 1–7 v Brothers Union (Away); 30 March 2024 (Premier League)
- Biggest defeat: 2–0 v Sharjah FC (Away); 15 August 2023 (Champions League); 3–1 v Maziya (Away); 19 September 2023 (AFC Cup)
Home colours	Away colours
- All statistics correct as of 30 March 2024.

The 2023–24 season is the Bashundhara Kings's 11th competitive professional season since its creation in 2013, and 6th consecutive season in Bangladesh Premier League, country's top-tier football league. In addition to the domestic league, Bashundhara Kings is participating in this season's edition of AFC Champions League, AFC Cup, Federation Cup and Independence Cup. This season will cover the period from 1 August 2023 to June 2024.

By participating in the 2023–24 AFC Champions League qualifying play-offs, Bashundhara became the first Bangladeshi club to participate in the AFC Champions League since the tournament was renamed in 2002 and overall fourth club from the country to play in Asia's top-tier club competition.

== Players ==
Players and squad numbers last updated on 29 April 2024.
Note: Flags indicate national team as has been defined under FIFA eligibility rules. Players may hold more than one non-FIFA nationality.

No.	Nat.	Player	Position(s)	Date of birth	Year signed	Previous club
Goalkeepers
1	(Bangladesh)	Anisur Rahman Zico (Vice-captain)	GK	10 August 1997 (age 29)	2018	Saif Sporting Club
27	(Bangladesh)	Mehedi Hasan	GK	2 January 2004 (age 22)	2020	Youth team
50	(Bangladesh)	Mehedi Hasan Srabon	GK	12 August 2005 (age 21)	2023	Muktijoddha SKC
66	(Bangladesh)	Md. Asif	GK	20 October 2006 (age 20)	2023	BFF Elite Academy
Defenders
2	(Bangladesh)	Yeasin Arafat	LB	5 January 2003 (age 23)	2021	Saif Sporting Club
4	(Bangladesh)	Topu Barman (Vice-captain)	CB	20 December 1994 (age 31)	2019	Abahani Ltd. Dhaka
5	(Bangladesh)	Tutul Hossain Badsha	CB	20 August 1999 (age 27)	2022	Abahani Ltd. Dhaka
12	(Bangladesh)	Bishwanath Ghosh	RB / CB	30 May 1999 (age 27)	2019	Sheikh Russel KC
18	(Bangladesh)	Mohammed Jahid Hossen	LB	1 June 2002 (age 24)	2023	Mohammedan SC
22	(Bangladesh)	Md Saad Uddin	RB / RM / RW	1 September 1998 (age 28)	2022	Sheikh Russel KC
40	(Bangladesh)	Tariq Kazi	RWB / LWB / CB	6 October 2000 (age 26)	2019	(Finland) Ilves
44	(Uzbekistan)	Boburbek Yuldashov	CB / DM	8 April 1993 (age 33)	2023	(Uzbekistan) FC Sogdiana Jizzakh
71	(Bangladesh)	Rimon Hossain	LB / LM	1 July 2005 (age 21)	2019	Arambagh FA
Midfielders
6	(Bangladesh)	Md Sohel Rana	DM / CM / AM	1 June 1996 (age 30)	2023	Abahani Ltd. Dhaka
7	(Bangladesh)	Masuk Mia Jony	DM / CM	16 January 1998 (age 28)	2018	Saif Sporting Club
8	(Brazil)	Miguel Figueira	AM	22 April 2000 (age 26)	2022	(Brazil) Goias
17	(Bangladesh)	Sohel Rana	CM / DM / AM	27 March 1995 (age 31)	2021	Abahani Ltd. Dhaka
24	(Ivory Coast)	Didier Brossou (remained as unregistered player in BPL 2nd phase)	CM / AM	23 December 1989 (age 36)	2023	Sheikh Russel KC
33	(Bangladesh)	Shekh Morsalin	AM / CM	25 November 2005 (age 20)	2021	Alamgir Somaj Kollayan KS
37	(Bangladesh)	Mojibur Rahman Jony	CM / AM	1 January 2005 (age 21)	2023	Fortis FC
52	(Bangladesh)	Md Sabbir Hossain	CM / DM / LB	28 June 2003 (age 23)	2022	Swadhinata KS
77	(Uzbekistan)	Asror Gofurov	DM / CM / AM	30 January 1995 (age 31)	2022	Saif Sporting Club
Forwards
9	(Brazil)	Dorielton	CF	7 March 1990 (age 36)	2022	Abahani Ltd. Dhaka
10	(Brazil)	Robinho (captain)	LW / RW / AM	21 July 1995 (age 31)	2020	(Brazil) Fluminense FC
11	(Bangladesh)	Tawhidul Alam Sabuz	CF / SS	14 September 1990 (age 36)	2018	Saif Sporting Club
15	(Bangladesh)	Biplu Ahmed	RW / AM	5 May 1999 (age 27)	2019	Sheikh Russel KC
19	(Bangladesh)	Mohammad Ibrahim	LW / RW	7 August 1997 (age 29)	2023	Sheikh Russel KC
20	(Bangladesh)	Rakib Hossain	RW / SS	18 November 1998 (age 27)	2022	Abahani Ltd. Dhaka
21	(Bangladesh)	Aminur Rahman Sajib	CF / LW	18 June 1994 (age 32)	2023	Muktijoddha SKC
23	(Bangladesh)	Rafiqul Islam	LW / RW	12 February 2004 (age 22)	2023	Fortis FC
29	(Bangladesh)	Motin Mia	CF / RW / SS	20 December 1998 (age 27)	2018	Saif Sporting Club
99	(Nigeria)	Mfon Udoh	LW / RW / CF	14 March 1992 (age 34)	2023	Sheikh Russel KC
Left during the season
30	(Bangladesh)	SK Saiful Islam	GK	3 March 1992 (age 34)	2023	Chittagong Abahani
70	(Uzbekistan)	Shokhrukhbek Kholmatov	DM / CB	16 March 1993 (age 33)	2023	Rahmatganj MFS

== Transfers ==
=== Transfers in ===
No.	Position	Player	Previous club	Fee	Date	Ref.
44	DF	(Uzbekistan) Boburbek Yuldashov	(Uzbekistan) FC Sogdiana Jizzakh	Free	July 2023	
19	FW	Mohammad Ibrahim	Sheikh Russel KC	Free	July 2023	
70	DF	(Uzbekistan) Shokhrukhbek Kholmatov	Rahmatganj MFS	Free	July 2023	
24	MF	(Ivory Coast) Didier Brossou	Sheikh Russel KC	Free	July 2023	
18	DF	Mohammed Jahid Hossen	Mohammedan SC	Free	July 2023	
21	FW	Aminur Rahman Sajib	Muktijoddha SKC	Free	July 2023	
37	FW	Mojibur Rahman Jony	Fortis FC	Free	July 2023	
23	MF	Rafiqul Islam	Fortis FC	Free	July 2023	
50	GK	Mehedi Hasan Srabon	Muktijoddha SKC	Free	July 2023	
6	MF	Shohel Rana	Dhaka Abahani	Free	September 2023	
99	FW	(Nigeria) Mfon Udoh	Sheikh Russel KC	Free	September 2023	

=== Transfers out ===
No.	Position	Player	Moved To	Fee	Date	Ref.
67	FW	Piash Ahmed Nova	Sheikh Jamal DC	Free	25 July 2023	
13	MF	Atiqur Rahman Fahad	Sheikh Jamal DC	Free	25 July 2023	
99	FW	Sumon Reza	Sheikh Russel KC	Free	July 2023	
22	GK	Sultan Ahmed Sakhil	Free agent	Free	July 2023	
66	DF	Mahamudul Hasan Kiron	Sheikh Jamal DC	Free	July 2023	
36	GK	Hamidur Rahman Remon	Sheikh Jamal DC	Free	July 2023	
42	GK	Darius Faris Rahman	Free agent	Free	July 2023	
70	MF	(Uzbekistan) Shokhrukhbek Kholmatov	Sheikh Jamal DC	Free	18 October 2023	
30	GK	SK Saiful Islam	Brothers Union	Free	March 2024	

== Pre-season and friendlies ==
19 November 2023	Bashundhara Kings	4–0	Soul FC	Dhaka
14:50 BST (UTC+6)	Mfon Udoh ×4	Report		Stadium: Bashundhara Sports Complex

== Competitions ==
=== Overall record ===
Competition	First match	Last match	Starting round	Final position	Record							
Competition	First match	Last match	Starting round	Final position	Pld	W	D	L	GF	GA	GD	Win %
Premier League	22 December 2023	29 May 2024	Matchday 1	TBD	16	13	2	1	46	12	+34	81.25
Independence Cup	28 October 2023	18 December 2023	Group Stage	Winners	5	4	1	0	9	2	+7	80.00
Federation Cup	26 December 2023	22 May 2024	Group Stage	TBD	4	4	0	0	7	0	+7	100.00
AFC Champions League	15 August 2023	15 August 2023	Preliminary round	Preliminary round	1	0	0	1	0	2	−2	0.00
AFC Cup	19 September 2023	11 December 2023	Group stage	Group stage	6	3	1	2	10	10	+0	50.00
Total					32	24	4	4	72	26	+46	75.00

Last updated: 18 May 2024
Source: Soccerway

=== Premier League ===
==== League table ====
Pos	Team	Pld	W	D	L	GF	GA	GD	Pts	Qualification or relegation
1	Bashundhara Kings (C, W, Q)	18	14	3	1	49	13	+36	45	Qualification for the AFC Challenge League group stage and 2024 Bangladesh Challenge Cup
2	Mohammedan SC (Q)	18	9	8	1	40	17	+23	35	Qualification for the 2024 Bangladesh Challenge Cup (Note: being Bashundhara Kings Champions and winners of both league and 2023–24 Federation Cup, Mohammedan SC qualified for 2024 Bangladesh Challenge Cup after being runners-up in both league and cup.)
3	Abahani Ltd. Dhaka	18	9	5	4	34	22	+12	32	
4	Bangladesh Police FC	18	7	5	6	23	19	+4	26	
5	Fortis FC	18	6	6	6	21	23	−2	24	

Source: Soccerway
Rules for classification: 1) Points; 2) Goal difference; 3) Goals scored.
(C) Champion; (Q) Qualify for the phase indicated; (W) Cup Winner

==== Results summary ====
Overall								Home						Away					
Pld	W	D	L	GF	GA	GD	Pts	W	D	L	GF	GA	GD	W	D	L	GF	GA	GD
16	13	2	1	46	12	+34	41	6	2	1	23	10	+13	7	0	0	23	2	+21

Last updated: 18 May 2024.
Source: Soccerway

==== Results by round ====
Round	1	2	3	4	5	6	7	8	9	10	11	12	13	14	15	16	17	18
Ground	H	H (Note: Due to unavailability of Munshigonj Stadium, the fixture had been swapped and Bashundhara played as the home team in Bashundhara Kings Arena. In the reverse fixture, Chittagong Abahani will play as the home team in Munshigonj.)	H	A	A	H	A	H	H	A	A	A	H	H	A	H	A	A
Result	W	W	W	W	W	L	W	W	D	W	W	W	W	W	W	D		
Position	1	1	1	1	1	1	1	1	1	1	1	1	1	1	1	1		

Updated to match(es) played on 18 May 2024. Source: Matches
A = Away; H = Home; W = Win; D = Draw; L = Loss; P = Postponed
Notes: Positions show the situation at the end of the corresponding Rounds, not the position at the conclusion of matches or game days.

==== Matches ====
22 December 2023 1	Bashundhara Kings	5–2	Brothers Union	Dhaka
16:30 BST (UTC+6)	Rakib 8'; Robinho (yellow card) 51', (goal) 87'; Dori 58', 61'; A. Gafurov (yellow card) 79'; Ibrahim 90+4'	Report	I. Khalil (yellow card) 66'; Rahul 69'; Otabek 90+2'	Stadium: Bashundhara Sports Complex; Referee: Bituraj Barua

30 December 2023 2	Bashundhara Kings	4–1	Chittagong Abahani	Dhaka
16:30 BST (UTC+6)	Dori 2', 40'; M. Figueira (yellow card) 4'; Rakib 29'; Bishwanath (yellow card) 30'; Robinho 87' (pen.)	Report	I. Remon (yellow card) 6'; A. Azeez 10'; Raihan (yellow card) 86'	Stadium: Bashundhara Sports Complex; Referee: Mohamad Alamgir Sarkar
Note: Due to unavailability of Bir Sreshtho Fl. Lt. Matiur Rahman Stadium in Munshigonj, the fixture had been swapped and Bashundhara played as the home team in Bashundhara Kings Arena. In the reverse fixture, Chittagong Abahani will play as the home team in Munshigonj.

12 January 2024 3	Bashundhara Kings	3–1	Fortis FC	Dhaka
17:00 BST (UTC+6)	Rakib 9'; Dori 21', (yellow card) 27'; Rimon 77'	Report	Tariq 13' (o.g.)	Stadium: Bashundhara Sports Complex; Referee: Mohammed Jalal Uddin

19 January 2024 4	Sheikh Jamal DC	0–3	Bashundhara Kings	Gopalganj
14:45 BST (UTC+6)	A. Shaeid (yellow card) 15'; Sazzad (yellow card) 55'; Pritom (yellow card) 73'; Higor Leite (yellow card) 77'; S. Shaymanov (yellow card) 82'	Report	Saad (yellow card) 11'; Rakib (yellow card) 44'; M. Zoni (yellow card) 46'; Sohel (yellow card) 75'; Dori 79', 90+2', (yellow card) 90+2'; M. Srabon (yellow card) 84'; Figueira (yellow card) 89'; Robinho 90+7'	Stadium: Sheikh Fazlul Haque Mani Stadium; Referee: Saymoon Hasan Sany

26 January 2024 5	Abahani Limited Dhaka	0–2	Bashundhara Kings	Gopalganj
14:45 BST (UTC+6)	M. Rana (yellow card) 38'; Royal (yellow card) 74'; M. Sheykh (yellow card) 85'; A. Bablu (yellow card) 87'	Report	Sohel (yellow card) 22'; Robinho 26'; Topu (yellow card) 30'; Figueira 72'; Yuldashov (red card) 90+9'	Stadium: Sheikh Fazlul Haque Mani Stadium; Referee: Mohammed Nasiruddin

3 February 2024 6	Bashundhara Kings	0–1	Mohammedan SC	Dhaka
17:15 BST (UTC+6)	Dori (yellow card) 73'	Report	Minhajul 40'; Diabate (yellow card) 81'; S. Topu (yellow card) 90+10'	Stadium: Bashundhara Sports Complex; Referee: Anisur Rahman

10 February 2024 7	Police FC	0–3	Bashundhara Kings	Mymensingh
15:00 BST (UTC+6)	Ismail (yellow card) 88'	Report	Figueira 7'; Rakib 21'; Gafurov 28'; Robinho (yellow card) 35'	Stadium: Rafiq Uddin Bhuiyan Stadium; Referee: Mohammed Nasiruddin

16 February 2024 8	Bashundhara Kings	4–1	Rahmatganj MFS	Dhaka
17:15 BST (UTC+6)	Rakib 25'; Bishwanath (yellow card) 33'; Figueira 55'; Sohel (yellow card) 78'; Dori 90+3'; Robinho 90+8' (pen.)	Report	Boateng 10'; Rokey (yellow card) 59'	Stadium: Bashundhara Sports Complex; Referee: Mohammed Nasiruddin

23 February 2024 9	Bashundhara Kings	1–1	Sheikh Russel KC	Dhaka
17:15 BST (UTC+6)	Bishwanath (yellow card) 28'; Dorielton (red card); Rakib 67'	Report	Ogungbe (yellow card) 43'; Kodai 46'; Mitul (yellow card) 90+8'	Stadium: Bashundhara Sports Complex; Referee: Bhubon Mohon Torafder

30 March 2024 10	Brothers Union	1–7	Bashundhara Kings	Rajshahi
14:45 BST (UTC+6)	Kingsley 45+2'	Report	Saad 19'; Robinho 30'; Figueira 37', 58'; M. Udoh 41', 68'; Sohel 51'	Stadium: Muktijuddho Sriti Stadium; Referee: GM Chowdhury

5 April 2024 11	Chittagong Abahani	0–5	Bashundhara Kings	Munshigonj
15:15 BST (UTC+6)	Mannaf (yellow card) 79'	Report	Dorielton 2'; Robinho 12' (pen.); Rakib 19', 53'; Sohel (yellow card) 27'; A. Gafurov 45+1'; Bishwanath (yellow card) 66'; Sohel (yellow card) 68'	Stadium: Bir Sreshtho Fl. Lt. Matiur Rahman Stadium; Referee: Mohammed Nasiruddin

20 April 2024 12	Fortis FC	0–1	Bashundhara Kings	Rajshahi
15:00 BST (UTC+6)	Sabuz (yellow card) 40'	Report	M. Figueira 23', (yellow card) 40'; Bishwanath (yellow card) 40'; Topu (yellow card) 90+3'	Stadium: Muktijuddho Sriti Stadium; Referee: Bhubon Mohon Torafder

27 April 2024 13	Bashundhara Kings	2–0	Sheikh Jamal DC	Dhaka
17:45 BST (UTC+6)	Topu (yellow card) 45'; Dori 18', 45+3'; Saad (yellow card) 81'	Report	A. Touré (yellow card) 15'; A. Shaeid (yellow card) 33'; M. Kiron (yellow card) 67'	Stadium: Bashundhara Sports Complex; Referee: Anisur Rahman

4 May 2024 14	Bashundhara Kings	2–1	Abahani Limited Dhaka	Dhaka
17:45 BST (UTC+6)	Rakib 5'; M. Figueira 35', (yellow card) 89'; Rimon (yellow card) 61'; Sohel (yellow card) 87'	Report	M. Sheykh (yellow card) 33'; C. Stewart 50'; Papon (yellow card) 54'	Stadium: Bashundhara Sports Complex; Referee: Mohammed Nasiruddin

10 May 2024 15	Mohammedan SC	1–2	Bashundhara Kings	Mymensingh
16:00 BST (UTC+6)	Diabate (yellow card) 14'; Muzaffarov (yellow card) 33'; M. Molla (yellow card) 45'; Minhajul 65'; E. Tony (yellow card) 81'	Report	Dori 19', 52'; Sohel (yellow card) 63'; Topu (yellow card) 68'; Rakib (yellow card) 77'; Saad (yellow card) 90+6'	Stadium: Rafiq Uddin Bhuiyan Stadium; Referee: Saymoon Hasan Sany

18 May 2024 16	Bashundhara Kings	2–2	Police FC	Dhaka
17:45 BST (UTC+6)	M. Udoh 43'; Dori 71'	Report	Mahdi 50'; E. Morillo 69'; I. Faysal (yellow card) 90+5'	Stadium: Bashundhara Sports Complex; Referee: GM Chowdhury

24 May 2024 17	Rahmatganj MFS	0–0	Bashundhara Kings	Munshigonj
16:00 BST (UTC+6)		Report	M. Figueira (yellow card) 15'; Jahid (yellow card) 40'; Bishwanath (yellow card) 75'	Stadium: Bir Sreshtho Fl. Lt. Matiur Rahman Stadium; Referee: Mohamad Alamgir Sarkar

29 May 2024 18	Sheikh Russel KC	1-3	Bashundhara Kings	Dhaka
16:00 BST (UTC+6)	Vojislav Balabanovic 13'	Report	M. Figueira 47'; Rakib 76'; Rakib (yellow card) 77'; Morsalin 78'; Yuldashov (yellow card) 87'	Stadium: Bashundhara Sports Complex; Referee: Sabuz Kumar Das

=== Independence Cup ===
==== Group stage ====
The draw ceremony were held on 23 October 2023 at 3rd floor of BFF house Motijheel, Dhaka. There are thirteen team was divided into four groups. Top two team from each group will through in the Knockout stage.

Pos	Team	Pld	W	D	L	GF	GA	GD	Pts	Qualification
1	Bashundhara Kings	2	1	1	0	1	0	+1	4	Advance to Knockout stage
2	Chittagong Abahani	2	0	2	0	1	1	0	2	Advance to Knockout stage
3	Bangladesh Navy FT	2	0	1	1	1	2	−1	1	

Source: GSA
Rules for classification: Group stage tiebreakers

28 October 2023 1	Bashundhara Kings	1–0	Bangladesh Navy	Dhaka
18:30 BST (UTC+6)	Figueira 3'; Sabbir (yellow card) 43'; Y. Arafat (yellow card) 85'	Report	S. Sarkar	Stadium: Bashundhara Kings Arena; Referee: Golam Mourshed Chowdhury Nayan

1 December 2023 3	Chittagong Abahani	0–0	Bashundhara Kings	Dhaka
14:30 BST (UTC+6)	A. Azeez (yellow card) 82'	Report	S. Rana (yellow card) 45+1'	Stadium: Bashundhara Kings Arena; Referee: Bhubon Mohon Torafder

==== Knockout phase ====
===== Quarter-final =====
5 December 2023 Quarter-final	Bashundhara Kings	2–1	Bangladesh Army FT	Dhaka
16:00 BST (UTC+6)	Figueira (yellow card) 30'; B. Yuldashov 38'; A. Gafurov (yellow card) 63'; Dorielton 76'	Report	S. Emon 61'; H. Tipu (yellow card) 90+2'	Stadium: Bashundhara Kings Arena; Referee: Md Alamgir Sarker

===== Semi-final =====
15 December 2023 Semi-final	Abahani Limited Dhaka	0–4	Bashundhara Kings	Dhaka
16:00 BST (UTC+6)		Report	Saad (yellow card) 30'; Rakib (yellow card) 43'; S. Rana 48'; Dorielton 53'; T. Kazi (yellow card) 66'; M. Srabon (yellow card) 71'; Figueira 77'; Robinho 89' (pen.)	Stadium: Bashundhara Kings Arena; Referee: Md Alamgir Sarker

===== Final =====
18 December 2023 Final	Mohammedan SC	1–2	Bashundhara Kings	Gopalganj
13:45 BST (UTC+6)	Emmanuel 51', (yellow card) 90+5'; O. Babu (yellow card) 64'; S. Fahim (yellow card) 89'	Report	Rafiqul (red card) 48'; Rakib 52'; Figueira (yellow card) 64'; Dorielton 86'; Robinho (yellow card) 90+3'; S. Rana (yellow card) 90+5'	Stadium: Sheikh Fazlul Haque Mani Stadium; Referee: Md Jalal Uddin

=== Federation Cup ===
==== Group stage ====
The draw ceremony were held on 13 December 2023 at BFF house in Motijheel, Dhaka. There are ten team was divided into three groups. Top two teams from each group and two best third-placed teams will through in the knockout stage.

Pos	Team	Pld	W	D	L	GF	GA	GD	Pts	Qualification
1	Bashundhara Kings	2	2	0	0	2	0	+2	6	Advance to Knockout stage
2	Fortis FC	2	1	0	1	3	2	+1	3	Advance to Knockout stage
3	Sheikh Russel KC	2	0	0	2	1	4	−3	0	Qualified as a best third place team to knockout stage

Source: Soccerway
Rules for classification: Group stages tiebreakers

26 December 2023	Bashundhara Kings	1–0	Fortis FC	Gopalganj
14:00 BST (UTC+6)	Dorielton 11'	Report		Stadium: Sheikh Fazlul Haque Mani Stadium; Referee: Md Anisur Rahman Sagor

6 February 2024	Sheikh Russel KC	0–1	Bashundhara Kings	Munshigonj
15:00 BST (UTC+6)		Report	Asror Gafurov 36'	Stadium: Shaheed Bir Sreshtho Flight Lieutenant Matiur Rahman Stadium; Referee: Md Alamgir Sarker

==== Knockout phase ====
===== Quarter-final =====
16 April 2024 Quarter-final	Bashundhara Kings	2–0	Rahmatganj MFS	Gopalganj
15:00 BST (UTC+6)	Sohel 24'; M. Udoh 62'	Report		Stadium: Sheikh Fazlul Haque Mani Stadium; Referee: GM Chowdhury

===== Semi-final =====
14 May 2024 Semi-final	Bashundhara Kings	3–0	Dhaka Abahani	Gopalganj
15:00 BST (UTC+6)	Robinho 21'; Dori 71'; Ibrahim 90+7'	Report		Stadium: Sheikh Fazlul Haque Mani Stadium; Referee: Anisur Rahman Sagor

===== Final =====
22 May 2024 Final	Mohammedan SC	v	Bashundhara Kings	Mymensingh
15:00 BST (UTC+6)	1		2	Stadium: Rafiq Uddin Bhuiyan Stadium

=== AFC Champions League ===
==== Qualifying play-offs ====
===== Preliminary round =====
15 August 2023 Preliminary round	Sharjah (United Arab Emirates)	2–0	(Bangladesh) Bashundhara Kings	Sharjah, United Arab Emirates
21:35 BST (UTC+6)	M. Pjanić (yellow card) 39'; Luanzinho 45+3', 71'; A. Al-Kaabi (yellow card) 88'	Report	Rakib (yellow card) 3'; Dorielton (yellow card) 48'; B. Ghosh (yellow card) 57'	Stadium: Sharjah Stadium; Attendance: 1,426; Referee: Nasrullo Kabirov (Tajikistan)

=== AFC Cup ===
==== Group stage ====
The draw for the 2023–24 AFC Cup group stage was held on 24 August 2023 at AFC House in Kuala Lumpur, Malaysia. The first group matches were played on 18 September 2023.

Pos	Team	Pld	W	D	L	GF	GA	GD	Pts	Qualification	ODI	BDK	MBSG	MAZ
1	(India) Odisha	6	4	0	2	17	12	+5	12	Inter-zone play-off semi-finals	—	1–0	0–4	6–1
2	(Bangladesh) Bashundhara Kings	6	3	1	2	10	10	0	10		3–2	—	2–1	2–1
3	(India) Mohun Bagan SG	6	2	1	3	11	11	0	7		2–5	2–2	—	2–1
4	(Maldives) Maziya	6	2	0	4	9	14	−5	6		2–3	3–1	1–0	—

Source: AFC
Rules for classification: Group stage tiebreakers

19 September 2023 1	Maziya (Maldives)	3–1	(Bangladesh) Bashundhara Kings	Malé, Maldives
16:00 BST (UTC+6)	Balabanović 15'; K. Gamal (yellow card) 28'; Nazeem 68'; H. Nihan (yellow card) 80'; Fasir 90+1'	Report	Rakib (yellow card) 52'; Saad (yellow card) 90'; Ibrahim 90+3'	Stadium: National Football Stadium; Attendance: 874; Referee: Razlan Joffri bin Ali (Malaysia)

2 October 2023 2	Bashundhara Kings (Bangladesh)	3–2	(India) Odisha	Dhaka, Bangladesh
18:00 BST (UTC+6)	M. Figueira 39', (yellow card) 90+2'; Dori 45', 54', (yellow card) 56'; S. Rana (yellow card) 90+7'	Report	C. Delgado (yellow card) 15'; D. Maurício 19'; P. Rebello (yellow card) 43'; J. Lalrinzuala 66'; R. Krishna (yellow card) 77'; Thoiba (yellow card) 88'	Stadium: Bashundhara Kings Arena; Attendance: 7,137; Referee: Mohammad Hasan Mahmoud Arafah (Jordan)

24 October 2023 3	Mohun Bagan SG (India)	2–2	(Bangladesh) Bashundhara Kings	Odisha, India
22:00 BST (UTC+6)	D. Petratos 29'; A. Rai 54'; J. Cummings (yellow card) 61'; A. Thapa (yellow card) 88'	Report	Dori 33', (yellow card) 55'; Robinho 70' (pen.)	Stadium: Kalinga Stadium; Attendance: 150; Referee: Clifford Postanes Daypuyat (Philippines)

7 November 2023 4	Bashundhara Kings (Bangladesh)	2–1	(India) Mohun Bagan SG	Dhaka, Bangladesh
20:00 BST (UTC+6)	M. Figueira 44'; Robinho 80'; M. Srabon (yellow card) 90'	Report	L. Colaco 17', (yellow card) 65'; S. Samad (yellow card) 74'; H. Boumous (yellow card) 83'; G. Martins (yellow card) 90+5'	Stadium: Bashundhara Kings Arena; Attendance: 7,137; Referee: Suhaizi Shukri (Malaysia)

27 November 2023 5	Bashundhara Kings (Bangladesh)	2–1	(Maldives) Maziya	Dhaka, Bangladesh
18:00 BST (UTC+6)	Rakib Hossain (yellow card) 40'; Yuldashov (yellow card) 78', (goal) 80'; Figueira 88'	Report	Regan 11'; H. Shareef (yellow card) 57'	Stadium: Bashundhara Kings Arena; Attendance: 6,552; Referee: Mohammad Hasan Mahmoud Arafah (Jordan)

11 December 2023 6	Odisha (India)	1–0	(Bangladesh) Bashundhara Kings	Bhubaneswar, India
20:00 BST (UTC+6)	M. Fall 61'; L. Khawlhring (yellow card) 67'; A. Ranawade (yellow card) 73'; A. Jahouh (yellow card) 86'; A. Jadhav (yellow card) 90+4'	Report	Rakib (yellow card) 20'; A. Gafurov (red card) 42'	Stadium: Kalinga Stadium; Attendance: 5,132; Referee: Duy Lân Ngô (Vietnam)

== Statistics ==
As of 5 April 2024

=== Squad statistics ===
Includes all competitions except Federation Cup.

No.	Pos	Nat	Player	Total		Premier League		Federation Cup		Independence Cup		AFC Champions League		AFC Cup	
No.	Pos	Nat	Player	Apps	Goals	Apps	Goals	Apps	Goals	Apps	Goals	Apps	Goals	Apps	Goals
Goalkeepers
1	GK	(Bangladesh) BAN	Anisur Rahman Zico	6	0	4	0	0	0	0	0	1	0	1	0
27	GK	(Bangladesh) BAN	Mehedi Hasan	1	0	0	0	0	0	0	0	0	0	1	0
30	GK	(Bangladesh) BAN	SK Saiful Islam	1	0	0	0	0	0	1	0	0	0	0	0
36	GK	(Bangladesh) BAN	Hamidur Rahman Remon	0	0	0	0	0	0	0	0	0	0	0	0
50	GK	(Bangladesh) BAN	Mehedi Hasan Srabon	15	0	7	0	0	0	4	0	0	0	4	0
Defenders
2	DF	(Bangladesh) BAN	Yeasin Arafat	6	0	0+3	0	0	0	2+1	0	0	0	0	0
4	DF	(Bangladesh) BAN	Topu Barman	13	0	9+2	0	0	0	0	0	1	0	0+1	0
5	DF	(Bangladesh) BAN	Tutul Hossain Badsha	8	0	1+3	0	0	0	2+2	0	0	0	0	0
12	DF	(Bangladesh) BAN	Bishwanath Ghosh	20	0	10	0	0	0	3	0	1	0	6	0
18	DF	(Bangladesh) BAN	Jahid Hossen	2	0	0+2	0	0	0	0	0	0	0	0	0
22	DF	(Bangladesh) BAN	Saad Uddin	19	1	9	1	0	0	3	0	1	0	6	0
40	DF	(Bangladesh) BAN	Tariq Kazi	14	0	3+2	0	0	0	3	0	0	0	6	0
44	DF	(Uzbekistan) UZB	Boburbek Yuldashov	21	2	9	0	0	0	4+1	1	1	0	6	1
71	DF	(Bangladesh) BAN	Rimon Hossain	8	1	3+4	1	0	0	1	0	0	0	0	0
Midfielders
6	MF	(Bangladesh) BAN	Shohel Rana	12	2	3+2	1	0	0	5	1	0	0	0+2	0
7	MF	(Bangladesh) BAN	Masuk Mia Jony	12	0	5+3	0	0	0	1+3	0	0	0	0	0
8	MF	(Brazil) BRA	Miguel Figueira	19	10	9	5	0	0	4	2	1	0	5	3
17	MF	(Bangladesh) BAN	Sohel Rana	17	0	10+1	0	0	0	0	0	0+1	0	1+4	0
24	MF	(Ivory Coast) CIV	Didier Brossou	7	0	1	0	0	0	0	0	1	0	5	0
33	MF	(Bangladesh) BAN	Shekh Morsalin	8	0	0	0	0	0	3+1	0	0+1	0	1+2	0
37	MF	(Bangladesh) BAN	Mojibur Rahman Jony	6	0	0+5	0	0	0	1	0	0	0	0	0
52	MF	(Bangladesh) BAN	Sabbir Hossen	4	0	0+2	0	0	0	2	0	0	0	0	0
77	MF	(Uzbekistan) UZB	Asror Gafurov	12	2	4	2	0	0	1	0	1	0	6	0
Forwards
9	FW	(Brazil) BRA	Dorielton	21	15	9	9	0	0	4+1	3	1	0	6	3
10	FW	(Brazil) BRA	Robinho	20	10	11	7	0	0	3	1	1	0	5	2
11	FW	(Bangladesh) BAN	Tawhidul Alam Sabuz	0	0	0	0	0	0	0	0	0	0	0	0
15	FW	(Bangladesh) BAN	Biplu Ahmed	1	0	0+1	0	0	0	0	0	0	0	0	0
19	FW	(Bangladesh) BAN	Mohammad Ibrahim	13	2	1+4	1	0	0	2+2	0	0+1	0	0+3	1
20	FW	(Bangladesh) BAN	Rakib Hossain	22	8	11	7	0	0	3+1	1	1	0	6	0
21	FW	(Bangladesh) BAN	Aminur Rahman Sajib	2	0	0+1	0	0	0	0+1	0	0	0	0	0
23	FW	(Bangladesh) BAN	Rafiqul Islam	8	0	1+1	0	0	0	2+3	0	0	0	0+1	0
29	FW	(Bangladesh) BAN	Motin Mia	5	0	0+3	0	0	0	1+1	0	0	0	0	0
99	FW	(Nigeria) NGR	Mfon Udoh	3	2	1	2	0	0	0	0	0	0	1+1	0
Players who left during the season
70	MF	(Uzbekistan) UZB	Shokhrukhbek Kholmatov	0	0	0	0	0	0	0	0	0	0	0	0

Source: Soccerway

=== Goalscorers ===
Includes all competitive matches. The list is sorted alphabetically by surname when total goals are equal.

Rank	No.	Pos.	Player	Premier League	Federation Cup	Independence Cup	AFC Cup	AFC Champions League	Total
1	9	FW	(Brazil) Dori	9	0	3	3	0	15
2	8	MF	(Brazil) Miguel Figueira	5	0	2	3	0	10
2	10	FW	(Brazil) Robinho	7	0	1	2	0	10
4	20	FW	(Bangladesh) Rakib Hossain	7	0	1	0	0	8
5	19	FW	(Bangladesh) Mohammad Ibrahim	1	0	0	1	0	2
5	6	MF	(Bangladesh) Sohel Rana	1	0	1	0	0	2
5	99	FW	(Nigeria) Mfon Udoh	2	0	0	0	0	2
5	44	DF	(Uzbekistan) Boburbek Yuldashov	0	0	1	1	0	2
5	77	MF	(Uzbekistan) Asror Gafurov	2	0	0	0	0	2
10	71	DF	(Bangladesh) Rimon Hossain	1	0	0	0	0	1
10	22	DF	(Bangladesh) Saad Uddin	1	0	0	0	0	1
Own goals				0	0	0	0	0	0
Totals				37	0	9	10	0	50

=== Assists ===
Includes all competitive matches. The list is sorted alphabetically by surname when total assists are equal.

Rank	No.	Pos.	Player	Premier League	Federation Cup	Independence Cup	AFC Champions League	AFC Cup	Total
1	10	FW	(Brazil) Robinho	7	0	1	0	2	10
2	8	MF	(Brazil) Miguel Figueira	5	0	3	0	0	8
3	9	FW	(Brazil) Dori	3	0	0	0	3	6
4	20	FW	(Bangladesh) Rakib Hossain	2	0	1	0	1	4
5	24	MF	(Ivory Coast) Didier Brossou	1	0	0	0	1	2
5	37	MF	(Bangladesh) Mojibur Jony	2	0	0	0	0	2
5	22	DF	(Bangladesh) Saad Uddin	0	0	2	0	0	2
5	71	DF	(Bangladesh) Rimon Hossain	2	0	0	0	0	2
8	5	DF	(Bangladesh) Tutul Badsha	1	0	0	0	0	1
8	4	DF	(Bangladesh) Topu Barman	1	0	0	0	0	1
8	33	MF	(Bangladesh) Shekh Morsalin	0	0	0	0	1	1
8	19	FW	(Bangladesh) Mohammad Ibrahim	1	0	0	0	0	1
8	23	FW	(Bangladesh) Rafiqul Islam	1	0	0	0	0	1
8	17	MF	(Bangladesh) Sohel Rana	1	0	0	0	0	1
8	44	DF	(Uzbekistan) Boburbek Yuldashov	1	0	0	0	0	1
8	7	MF	(Bangladesh) Masuk Mia Zoni	1	0	0	0	0	1
Totals				29	0	7	0	8	44
