= Md Saad Uddin =

Bangladeshi footballer (born 1998)

Mohammed Saad Uddin
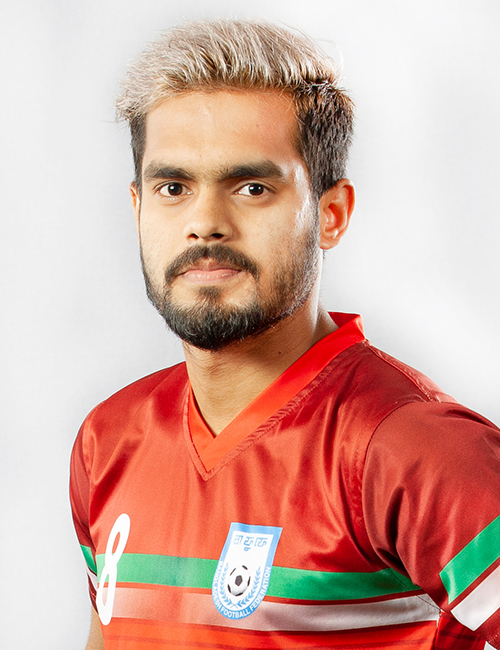
- Saad Uddin with Bangladesh

Personal information
- Full name: Mohammed Saad Uddin
- Date of birth: 1 September 1998 (age 28)
- Place of birth: Sylhet, Bangladesh
- Height: 1.75 m (5 ft 9 in)
- Positions: Full-back; winger

Team information
- Current team: Mohammedan
- Number: 22

Youth career
- 2015: BFF Elite FA

Senior career*
Years	Team	Apps	(Gls)
2015	Friends SWO		
2015–2016	Victoria		(1)
2016–2021	Dhaka Abahani	60	(3)
2021–2022	Sheikh Russel	13	(0)
2022–2026	Bashundhara Kings	57	(1)
2026–	Mohammedan	3	(0)

International career^{‡}
2015	Bangladesh U16	4	(1)
2015	Bangladesh U19	3	(0)
2018–2019	Bangladesh U23	11	(1)
2018–	Bangladesh	54	(2)
Medal record
Representing Bangladesh
SAFF U-17 Championship
Winner	2015 Bangladesh	Team
South Asian Games
Bronze medal – third place	2019 Kathmandu
- * Club domestic league appearances and goals as of 24 October 2026 ‡ National team caps and goals as of 11 November 2026

Mohammed Saad Uddin (Bengali: মো: সাদ উদ্দিন; born 1 September 1998) is a Bangladeshi professional footballer who plays as a right-back and sometimes left-back or right-winger for Bangladesh Football League club Mohammedan and Bangladesh national team.

== Early life ==
Kuchai Union of South Surma Upazila in the suburbs of Sylhet, Bangladesh. He began playing football at a local academy under the guidance of coach Sohel Ahmed and participated in inter-union football tournaments.

== Club career ==
=== Early career ===
Saad began his career with Friends SWO in the Senior Division of Dhaka in 2015. His performances attracted the attention of Syed Golam Jilani, then a coach at the BFF Elite Football Academy programme in Sylhet, who recruited him into the academy's U16 team. Saad was subsequently selected for the Bangladesh U16 team.

In 2016, Saad joined Victoria SC, competing in the Bangladesh Championship League, the country's second-tier professional league. He scored his first professional goal on 20 December 2015, in a league match against Fakirerpool YMC. During his time at the club, he also began playing as a striker. Later that year, he joined Dhaka Abahani after being signed by the club's football manager, Satyajit Das Rupu.

=== Dhaka Abahani ===
Saad made his top-tier debut with Dhaka Abahani on 7 November 2016 during which he scored against Feni Soccer Club in a 5–1 victory. On 3 May 2017, Saad scored in a 2–0 victory against Bengaluru FC in the 2017 AFC Cup. On 30 August, he scored from 30 yards against Arambagh KS in a 2–1 victory in the league.

Following the conclusion of the 2020–21 season, Saad announced his departure from the club after six seasons, during which he made 60 league appearances and won the league title in both 2016 and 2017–18. He also won three Federation Cup titles at the club and was part of the team that reached the Inter-zone play-off semi-finals of the 2019 AFC Cup. During his final two seasons, Saad originally a right-winger, was sometimes deployed as a right full-back by coach Mário Lemos.

=== Sheikh Russel ===
Saad played for Sheikh Russel KC in the 2021–22 season, making 22 appearances across all competitions for the club playing as a right-back.

=== Bashundhara Kings ===
Saad joined Bashundhara Kings in the 2022–23 season. His first goal for the club came 30 March 2024, in a 7–1 victory against Brothers Union.

On 16 May 2025, Saad was handed a six-month ban by the BFF for reportedly grabbing match commissioner Sujit Banerjee by the throat during a league fixture against Dhaka Abahani on 2 May. He was also fined Tk 50,000 for the physical altercation. However, on 20 May, the BFF controversially reduced his suspension to just 22 days. According to The Daily Star, "The suspension was ultimately reduced to four matches under Clause 45, Article 1.A, (of the BFF disciplinary guidelines) which allows for a minimum four-match ban for unsporting behavior toward match officials. However, Saad's actions clearly fall under Clause 45, Article 1.B, which stipulates a minimum six-month suspension for assaulting a match official."

Saad departed Kings after the 2025–26 season following a four-year spell during which he made 101 appearances across all competitions, scoring once. He also won the league title in 2022–23, 2023–24 and 2025–26, three Federation Cup titles and one Independence Cup. He also notably featured in the 2023–24 AFC Champions League qualifying play-offs against Sharjah FC.

=== Mohammedan ===
Saad joined Mohammedan in August 2026.

== International career ==
=== Youth ===
Saad was instrumental in Bangladesh U16's 2015 SAFF U-16 Championship triumph in Dhaka, Bangladesh. He scored the winning penalty in the final penalty shootout against India U16 and also had scored the decisive goal against Afghanistan U16 in the semi-final. He was deployed as a right winger or attacking midfielder during the tournament by coach Syed Golam Jilani. In the same year he represented Bangladesh U19 in the 2016 AFC U-19 Championship qualification in Dhaka, playing as winger. In 2017, he represented Bangladesh U23 in the 2018 AFC U-23 Championship qualification held in Hebron, Palestine.

The following year, he was selected for the 2018 Asian Games in Indonesia. On 3 August, he netted in a preparation match against Sehan University FC which the Bangladesh U23 won 2–1 at the Mokpo International Football Center in Mokpo, South Korea. He also scored in a 3–1 Asian Games round of 16 defeat to North Korea U23 on 24 August at the Wibawa Mukti Stadium in Cikarang, Indonesia.

=== Senior ===
On 4 September 2018, Saad made his senior debut against Bhutan during the 2018 SAFF Championship. On 15 October 2019, he scored his first senior international goal in a 1–1 draw against India in the 2022 FIFA World Cup qualification – AFC second round at the Salt Lake Stadium in Kolkata, India.

On 13 October 2021, Saad conceded an 88th-minute penalty against Nepal in the final round-robin match of the 2021 SAFF Championship, preventing Bangladesh from reaching the tournament final. The match ended in a 1–1 draw, allowing Nepal to secure second place ahead of Bangladesh. On 16 November 2021, Saad handled the ball to concede a penalty in the 2021 Four Nations Football Tournament, held in Sri Lanka, as the hosts defeated Bangladesh 2–1 to reach the tournament final.

On 28 March 2023, Saad once again conceded a penalty in a friendly match against Seychelles. The penalty was converted, as Bangladesh suffered a 1–0 defeat at Sylhet Stadium. On 12 October, Saad netted in a 1–1 draw against Maldives in the first-leg match of the 2026 FIFA World Cup qualification – AFC first round.

== Personal life ==
Saad's younger brother, Mohammed Taj Uddin, is also a professional footballer.

=== Controversy ===
On 2 October 2026, Saad came under scrutiny after photos allegedly showing him at a Jakarta nightclub with teammate Sohel Rana Jr surfaced hours after Bangladesh's 9-2 defeat to Indonesia in the 2026 FIFA ASEAN Cup. The photos went viral on Bangladeshi social media, raising questions about the player's whereabouts despite instructions to return to their hotel rooms. Team manager Amirul Islam Babu warned that disciplinary action would be taken if any breach of team rules was confirmed.

== Career statistics ==
=== Club ===
As of 15 May 2026.

Club	Season	League			Cup (Note: Appearance(s) in Bangladesh Federation Cup)		Other		Continental		Total	
Club	Season	Division	Apps	Goals	Apps	Goals	Apps	Goals	Apps	Goals	Apps	Goals
Dhaka Abahani	2016–17	BFL	3	1	0	0	0	0	3 (Note: Appearance(s) in AFC Cup)	1	6	2
Dhaka Abahani	2017–18	BFL	21	1	3	0	3 (Note: Appearance(s) in Bangladesh Independence Cup)	0	5	0	32	1
Dhaka Abahani	2018–19	BFL	11	0	0	0	0	0	5	0	16	0
Dhaka Abahani	2019–20	BFL	6	0	3	0	—		2	0	11	0
Dhaka Abahani	2021–21	BFL	19	1	4	0	—		0	0	23	1
Dhaka Abahani	Total		60	3	10	0	3	0	15	1	88	4
Sheikh Russel	2021–22	BFL	13	0	3	0	6	0	—		22	0
Bashundhara Kings	2022–23	BFL	13	0	3	0	6	0	—		22	0
Bashundhara Kings	2023–24	BFL	15	1	4	0	3	0	7 (Note: One appearance in AFC Champions League, six appearance(s) in the AFC Cup)	0	29	1
Bashundhara Kings	2024–25	BFL	14	0	6	0	1 (Note: Appearance in Bangladesh Challenge Cup)	0	3 (Note: Appearance(s) in AFC Challenge League)	0	24	0
Bashundhara Kings	2025–26	BFL	15	0	6	0	1	0	4	0	26	0
Bashundhara Kings	Total		57	1	19	0	11	0	14	0	101	1
Mohammedan	2026–27	BFL	0	0	0	0	—		—		0	0
Career total			130	4	32	0	20	0	29	1	211	5

=== International ===
As of 11 November 2026

Appearances and goals by national team and year
National team	Year	Apps	Goals
Bangladesh
Bangladesh	2018	3	0
Bangladesh	2019	6	1
Bangladesh	2020	6	0
Bangladesh	2021	8	0
Bangladesh	2023	7	1
Bangladesh	2024	8	0
Bangladesh	2025	8	0
Bangladesh	2026	8	0
Bangladesh	Total	54	2

Scores and results list Bangladesh's goal tally first.

List of international goals scored by Saad Uddin
No.	Date	Venue	Opponent	Score	Result	Competition
1.	15 October 2019	Salt Lake Stadium, Kolkata	India	1–0	1–1	2022 FIFA World Cup qualification
2.	12 October 2023	National Football Stadium, Malé	Maldives	1–1	1–1	2026 FIFA World Cup qualification

== Honours ==
Club

Dhaka Abahani

- Bangladesh Football League: 2016, 2017–18
- Federation Cup: 2016, 2017, 2018

Bashundhara Kings

- Bangladesh Football League: 2022–23, 2023–24, 2025–26
- Independence Cup: 2022–23, 2023–24
- Federation Cup: 2023–24, 2024–25, 2025–26

International

- SAFF U-16 Championship: 2015
- South Asian Games bronze medal: 2019
- Three Nations Cup runner-up: 2021
