= Raphael Augusto =

Brazilian footballer (born 1991)

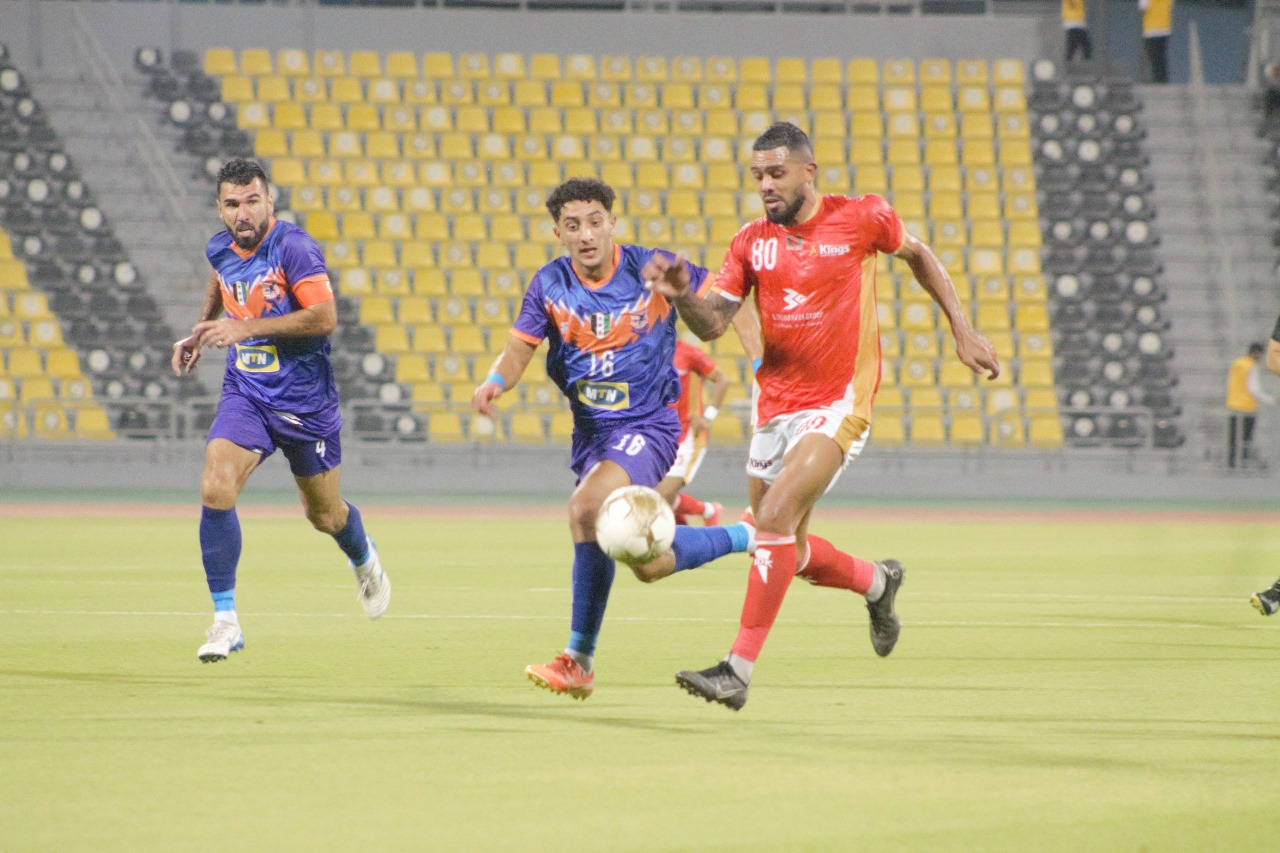
- Augusto in action with Bashundhara Kings

Personal information
- Full name: Raphael Augusto Santos
- Date of birth: 6 March 1991 (age 35)
- Place of birth: Rio de Janeiro, Brazil
- Height: 1.81 m (5 ft 11 1/2 in)
- Position: Midfielder

Youth career
- 2006–2008: Fluminense

Senior career*
Years	Team	Apps	(Gls)
2009–2016	Fluminense	1	(0)
2011–2012	→ Duque de Caxias (loan)	7	(0)
2012	→ América-RN (loan)	3	(0)
2012–2013	→ D.C. United (loan)	8	(0)
2013–2014	→ Legia Warsaw (loan)	9	(0)
2013–2014	→ Legia Warsaw II (loan)	11	(2)
2015	→ Bangu (loan)		
2015	→ Madureira (loan)	6	(0)
2015	→ Chennaiyin (loan)	12	(1)
2016–2019	Chennaiyin	64	(15)
2019–2020	Bengaluru	9	(0)
2020–2023	Dhaka Abahani	45	(13)
2024	Bangu	6	(0)
2024	Forca Kochi		
2024	Volta Redonda	2	(0)
2025	Bangu	5	(0)
2025	Dhaka Abahani	8	(4)
2025–2026	Bashundhara Kings	5	(1)
- * Club domestic league appearances and goals as of 27 May 2025

Raphael Augusto Santos da Silva (born 6 March 1991) is a Brazilian professional footballer who last played as a midfielder for Bangladesh Football League club Bashundhara Kings . Known for midfield skills, he enjoyed success in India and Bangladesh, most notably by winning two Indian Super League titles with Chennaiyin.

== Club career ==
Born in Rio de Janeiro, Augusto graduated from the youth academy of Fluminense and made his senior debut in the Série A season. After playing for Duque de Caxias and América-RN in his country on loan, he joined Major League Soccer club D.C. United on loan on 28 July 2012. On 11 November, he made his debut, coming on as a substitute for the injured Marcelo Saragosa in a 3–1 defeat against Houston Dynamo. On 14 June 2013, he returned to his parent club after his contract was terminated by mutual consent. Seven days later, he joined Polish club Legia Warsaw on a loan deal. On 14 May 2014, manager Henning Berg announced that Augusto would return to Flu in summer.

After loan stints with Bangu and Madureira in 2015, Augusto was loaned out to Indian Super League club Chennaiyin FC on 11 August 2015. On 18 November, he scored his first goal for the club in a 2–1 defeat against ATK. Although his club went on to win the league, he missed the final due to an injury. On 17 July 2016, he signed permanently with the club. He went on to play all the matches for the club during the season.

On 31 January 2017, Augusto was reloaned to Brazilian club Bangu. On 20 July, he signed a two-year contract extension. He played 18 times during the 2017–18 season, scoring three goals and adding one assist, with his side winning the league.

On 24 August 2019, Augusto signed for Bengaluru FC on a two-year deal, that kept him with the Blues till the end of the 2020–21 season.

On 30 November 2020, Augusto signed for Abahani Limited Dhaka in Bangladesh Football Premier League. Raphael Augusto made his debut for Bashundhara Kings 12 august in Qatar during the AFC Challenge League.

== Honours ==
Chennaiyin

- Indian Super League: 2015, 2018

Abahani Limited Dhaka

- Independence Cup: 2021–22
- Federation Cup: 2021–22

Bashundhara Kings

- Bangladesh Challenge Cup: 2025
