= 2025 Bangladesh Challenge Cup =

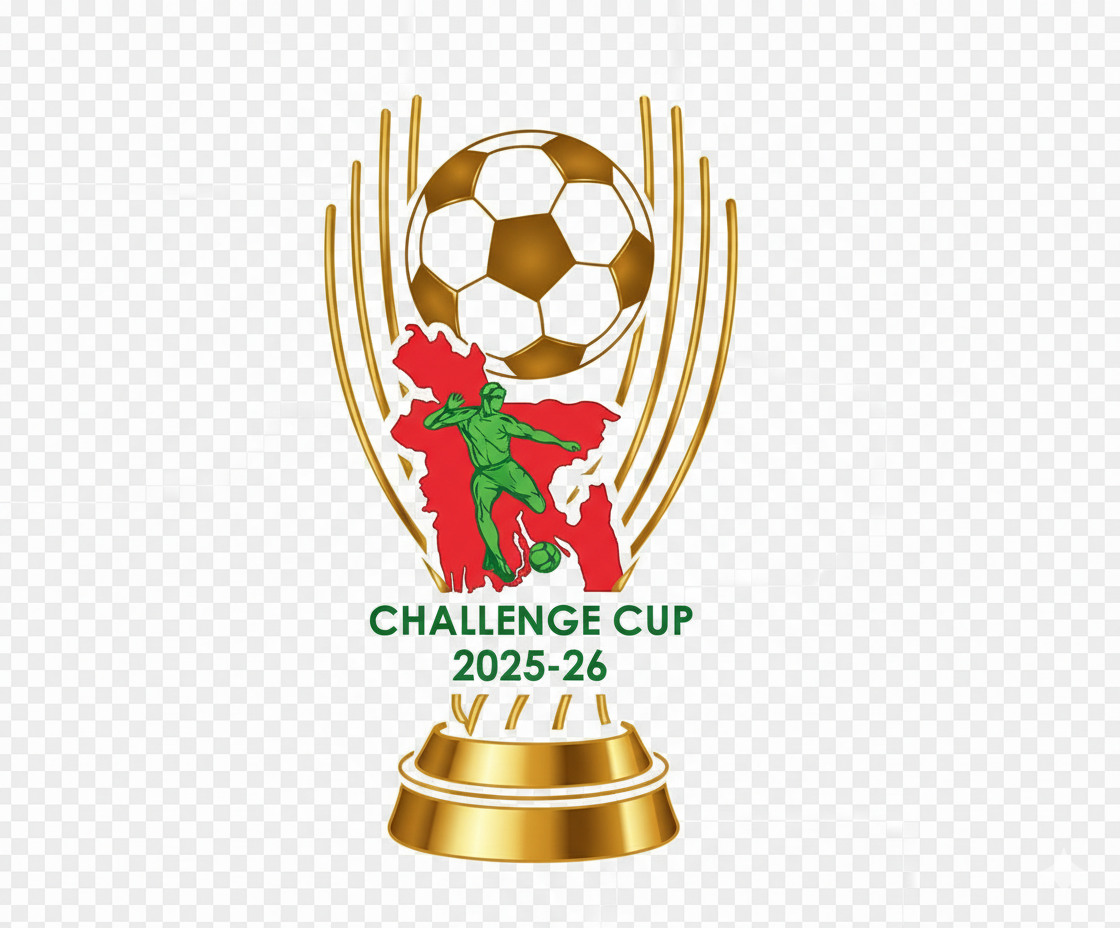
- Event: Bangladesh Challenge Cup
Mohammedan SC	Bashundhara Kings
1	4
- Date: 19 September 2025
- Venue: Shaheed Dhirendranath Datta Stadium, Comilla
- Man of the Match: (Brazil) Raphael Augusto (Bashundhara Kings)
- Referee: Md Saymoon Hasan Sany
- Weather: Passing showers and Broken clouds 34 °C (93 °F); 64% humidity

The 2025 Bangladesh Challenge Cup was the second edition of the Bangladesh Challenge Cup. It is an annual football match contested by the champions of the previous season's Bangladesh Football League and Federation Cup competitions. Mohammedan SC crowned the champions of 2024–25 Bangladesh Premier League for the first time ever. Bashundhara Kings qualified as 2024–25 Fed Cup winners.

Bashundhara Kings is the current edition champions of the cup who beat Mohammedan SC by 4–1 goals on 19 September 2025.

== Venue ==
The match of the cup were played in the following venue.

Comilla	Comilla is located in Bangladesh
Shaheed Dhirendranath Datta Stadium	Comilla is located in Bangladesh
Capacity: 18,000	Comilla is located in Bangladesh

== Teams ==
The following two teams qualified for the tournament.

Team	Qualification	App. (last)	Previous best result
Mohammedan SC	2024–25 Bangladesh Premier League Champions	2nd (2024)	Runners-up
Bashundhara Kings	2024–25 Federation Cup winners	2nd (2024)	Champions

== Match officials ==
The following officials were chosen for the cup by BFF tournament committee.

Referee

- (Bangladesh) Md Saymoon Hasan Sany

Assistant Referees

- (Bangladesh) Md Nuruzzaman
- (Bangladesh) Shohrab Hossain

Referee Assosors

- (Bangladesh) Ferdous Ahmed

Match Commissioners

- (Bangladesh) Sujit Banerjee

== Match ==
=== Details ===
19 September 2025
14:30 BST (UTC+6)

Mohammedan SC	1–4	Bashundhara Kings
M. Muzaffarov 15' (pen.)	Report	Dorielton 8' (pen.), 86'; R. Augusto 72'; S. Emmanuel 74'

Shaheed Dhirendranath Datta Stadium, Comilla
Referee: Md Saymoon Hasan Sany
Man of the Match: Raphael Augusto (Bashundhara Kings)

Mohammedan	Bashundhara Kings

Manager: (Bangladesh) Alfaz Ahmed	Manager: (Argentina) Mario Gómez

Man of the Match:
(Brazil) Raphael Augusto (Bashundhara Kings)

=== Goalscorers ===
There have been 5 goals scored in 1 match, for an average of 5 goals per match.

2 goals

- (Brazil) Dorielton (Bashundhara Kings)

1 goal

- (Brazil) Raphael Augusto (Bashundhara Kings)
- (Nigeria) Sunday Emmanuel (Bashundhara Kings)
- (Uzbekistan) Muzaffar Muzaffarov (Mohammedan SC)

== Broadcasting ==
Territory	Broadcaster(s)	Reference
No restricted territory	T Sports; T Sports YouTube^{(YouTube channel)}	2025 Bangladesh Challenge Cup on YouTube

== See also ==
- 2025–26 Bangladesh Football League
- 2025–26 Federation Cup
- 2025–26 in Bangladeshi football
