= 2024 Bangladesh Challenge Cup =

2024 Bangladesh Challenge Cup ২০২৪ বাংলাদেশ চ্যালেঞ্জ কাপ
- Event: Bangladesh Challenge Cup
Bashundhara Kings	Mohammedan SC
3	1
- Date: 22 November 2024
- Venue: Bashundhara Kings Arena, Dhaka
- Man of the Match: (Bangladesh) Topu Barman (Bashundhara Kings)
- Referee: Virendra Rai
- Weather: Clear night 25 °C (77 °F); 34% humidity

The 2024 Bangladesh Challenge Cup also known as Bangladesh 2.0 Challenge Cup was the inaugural edition of the Bangladesh Challenge Cup. It is an annual football match contested by the winners of the previous season's Bangladesh Premier League and Federation Cup competitions. Bashundhara Kings won both league and cup as a result Federation Cup runners up Mohammedan SC are the opposition. The match of the cup was played on 22 November 2024.

Bashundhara Kings is the current edition champions of the cup who beat Mohammedan SC by 3–1 goals on 22 November 2024.

== Venue ==
The match of the Cup was played at these venue.

Dhaka	Dhaka is located in Bangladesh
Bashundhara Kings Arena	Dhaka is located in Bangladesh
Capacity: 6,000	Dhaka is located in Bangladesh

== Teams ==
The following two teams qualified for the tournament.

Team	Qualification	Previous appearances
Bashundhara Kings	2023–24 Bangladesh Premier League Champions and 2023–24 Federation Cup Winners	Inaugural edition
Mohammedan SC	2023–24 Bangladesh Premier League Runners-up and 2023–24 Federation Cup Runners-up	Inaugural edition

== Match officials ==
The following officials were chosen for the cup.

Referees

- (Bhutan) Virendra Rai

Assistant Referees

- (Bangladesh) Md Symoon Hasan Sany
- (Bhutan) Passang Passang
- (Bhutan) Hem Kumar Sunwar

== Match ==
=== Details ===
22 November 2024
17:00 BST (UTC+6)

Bashundhara Kings	3–1	Mohammedan SC
Topu 73'; Fahim 81'; Miguel 90+7'	Report	Diabate 7'

Bashundhara Kings Arena, Dhaka
Referee: Virendra Rai (Bhutan)

Bashundhara Kings	Mohammedan

Manager: (Romania) Valeriu Tița	Manager: (Bangladesh) Alfaz Ahmed

Man of the Match:
Topu Barman (Bashundhara Kings)

=== Goalscorers ===
There have been 4 goals scored in 1 match, for an average of 4 goals per match.

1 goal

- (Mali) Souleymane Diabate (Mohammedan SC)
- (Bangladesh) Topu Barman (Bashundhara Kings)
- (Bangladesh) Foysal Ahmed Fahim (Bashundhara Kings)
- (Brazil) Miguel Figueira (Bashundhara Kings)

== See also ==
- 2024–25 Bangladesh Premier League
- 2024–25 Federation Cup
