= Bangladesh Challenge Cup =

Bangladesh Football super cup game

- Organiser(s): BFF
- Founded: 2024; 2 years ago
- Region: Bangladesh
- Teams: 2
- Related competitions: Bangladesh Football League (qualifier); Federation Cup (qualifier)
- Current champions: Bashundhara Kings (2nd title)
- Most championships: Bashundhara Kings (2 title)
- Broadcaster(s): T Sports; T Sports YouTube
- 2025 Bangladesh Challenge Cup

The Bangladesh Challenge Cup, also known as the Challenge Cup, is Bangladesh football's annual match contested between the champions of the previous Bangladesh Football League season and the winners of the Federation Cup. If the league champions also won the cup, then the cup runners-up provide the opposition. Bashundhara Kings is the first club to win this cup, beating Mohammedan SC on 3–1 margin.

== History ==
=== Inaugural edition ===
The 2024 Bangladesh Challenge Cup, also known as the Bangladesh 2.0 Challenge Cup, marked the inaugural edition of this new football competition. This annual event pits the champions of the previous League season against the winners of the Previous Federation Cup.

The first edition of the Challenge Cup took place on 22 November, 2024, with Bashundhara Kings emerging as the inaugural champions. The match was played at Bashundhara Kings Arena.

As Bashundhara had won both the league and the cup, the Federation Cup runners-up, Mohammedan SC, were their opponents in the final. Kings secured a 3–1 victory, etching their name in the history books as the first-ever winners of the Bangladesh Challenge Cup.

=== 2025; Second edition ===
The 2025 Bangladesh Challenge Cup is the second edition. It is an annual football match contested by the champions of the previous season's Bangladesh Premier League and Federation Cup competitions. Mohammedan SC crowned the champions of 2024–25 Bangladesh Premier League for the first time ever. Bashundhara Kings qualified as 2024–25 Fed Cup winners.

Bashundhara Kings is the depending champions of the cup who beat previous edition's runners-up Mohammedan SC by 4–1 goals on 19 September ২০২৫.

== Results ==
Bangladesh Challenge Cup winners
Year	Winners	Score	Runners-up	Venue	Attendance	Ref(s)
2024	Bashundhara Kings	2–1	Mohammedan SC	Bashundhara Kings Arena	Unknown	
2025	Bashundhara Kings	4–1	Mohammedan SC	Shaheed Dhirendranath Datta Stadium	Unknown	

== Statistics by club ==
Team	Winner	Runners-up	Years won	Years runners-up
Bashundhara Kings	2	—N/a	2024, 2025	—N/a
Mohammedan SC	—N/a	2	—N/a	2024, 2025

== See also ==
- Federation Cup
- Independence Cup
- Bangladesh Super Cup
- Bangladesh Football League
- Bangladesh Championship League
