= Topu Barman =

Bangladeshi footballer

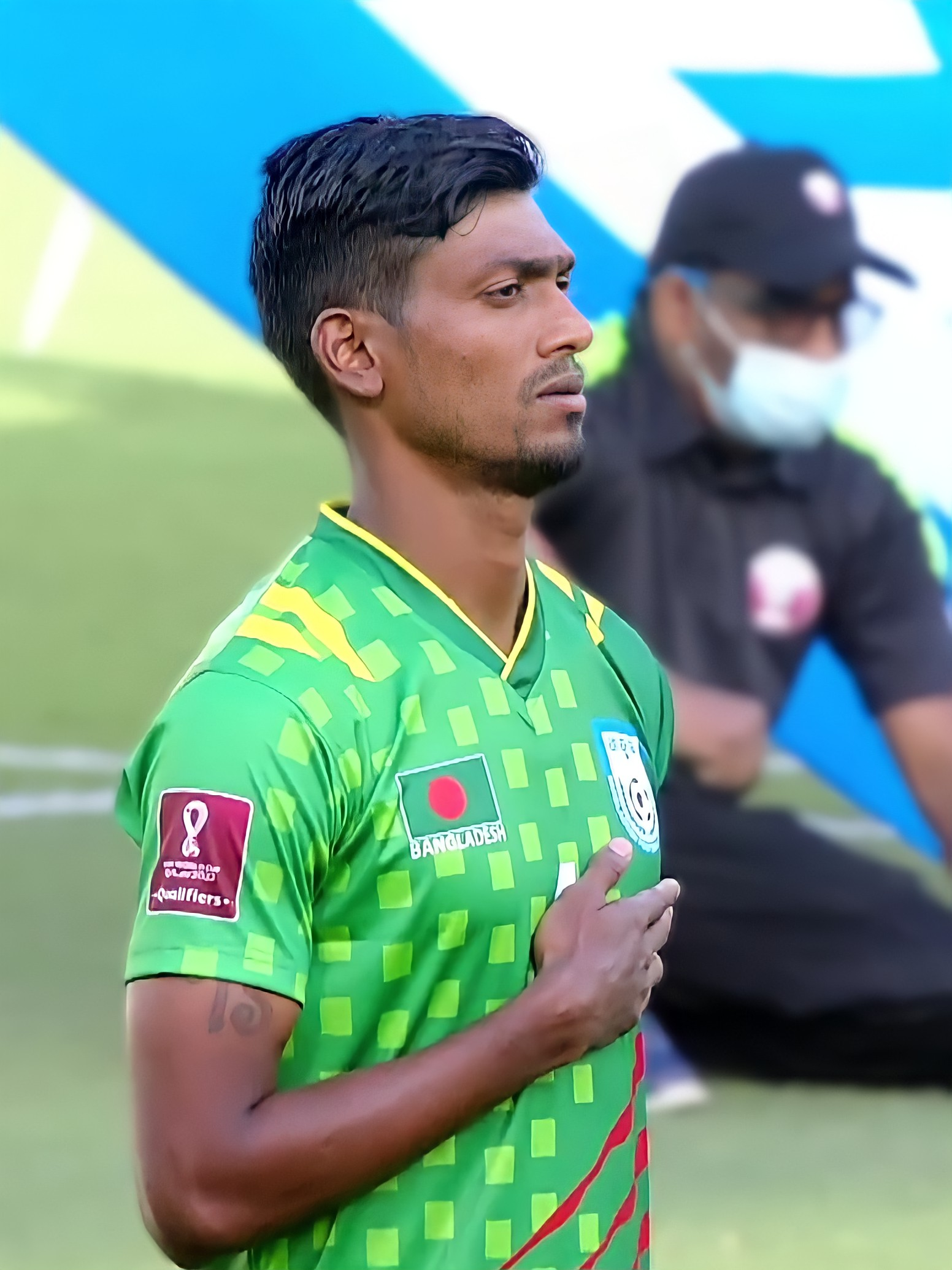
- Topu with Bangladesh in 2021

Personal information
- Full name: Topu Barman
- Date of birth: 20 December 1994 (age 31)
- Place of birth: Narayanganj, Bangladesh
- Height: 1.83 m (6 ft 0 in)
- Position: Centre-back

Team information
- Current team: Bashundhara Kings
- Number: 4

Senior career*
Years	Team	Apps	(Gls)
2009–2011	Wari Club		
2011–2014	Mohammedan		(2)
2014–2015	Sheikh Russel		(0)
2015–2016	Sheikh Jamal Dhanmondi		(0)
2016–2017	Dhaka Abahani		(0)
2017–2018	Saif	19	(2)
2018–2019	Dhaka Abahani	10	(1)
2019–	Bashundhara Kings	82	(6)

International career^{‡}
2009	Bangladesh U16	4	(0)
2011	Bangladesh U19	3	(0)
2014–2017	Bangladesh U23	13	(0)
2013–	Bangladesh	70	(8)
Medal record
Representing Bangladesh
South Asian Games
Bronze medal – third place	2016 Guwahati
Bronze medal – third place	2019 Kathmandu
- * Club domestic league appearances and goals as of 6 June 2026 ‡ National team caps and goals as of 6 June 2026

Topu Barman (Bengali: তপু বর্মন; born 20 December 1994) is a Bangladeshi professional footballer who plays as a centre back for Bangladesh Premier League club Bashundhara Kings and captains the Bangladesh national team.

In 2026, Topu scored both goals in Bangladesh's famous 2–1 friendly victory over San Marino, securing the country's first-ever win against European opposition and its first victory on European soil.

== Early career ==
Topu was scouted in 2006 by Canary Wharf Group's talent search programme. After initial trials, he spent two years at the Bangladesh Krira Shikkha Protishtan (BKSP) under the supervision of local coaches Golam Sarwar Tipu and Rezaul Haq Jamal. In 2008, Topu, along with a few under-16 players, attended a three-week training session at the David Beckham Academy in London. Topu, who was initially selected for training by English coach Anthony Ferguson and England-born Bangladeshi footballer Anwar Uddin, was granted Tk 10,000 scholarship by the Canary Wharf Group after completing its programme.

== Club career ==
In 2009, he joined Wari Club in the Dhaka Senior Division League. In 2011, he joined Mohammedan SC in top-tier, the Bangladesh Premier League, which was also the country's sole professional league at the time.

In 2014, Topu won the Super Cup with Mohammedan, defeating Sheikh Russel KC 4–2 on penalties. He won the 2016 Bangladesh Premier League with Abahani Limited Dhaka as undefeated champions. In 2017, he was one of the highest paid local players after joining the newly promoted Saif SC.

In 2019, Topu joined Bashundhara Kings. He made his debut for Kings during a 2019 Federation Cup match against Chittagong Abahani, on 27 December 2019. His first goal for the club came against Police FC in the same competition, on 1 January 2020. The tournament was his first title triumph with Kings.

Before the start of the 2020 Federation Cup, Topu was named as the new club captain following the departure of Daniel Colindres. Topu played twice during the tournament as Kings lifted the trophy for the second year running. He helped Kings keep a solid defense as they won the 2021 Bangladesh Premier League with 4 league games remaining. He ended the league season with a first-half brace against his former club and title rival, Abahani Limited Dhaka. He scored an own goal 28 minutes into the match and then made amends with a headed goal into the Abahani net 10 minutes later.

=== Interest from abroad ===
After the 2021 SAFF Championship Topu has had offers from NorthEast United FC who currently play in the Indian Super League, the topflight of Indian football and he also has attracted interest from an unknown club from the Qatari Second Division also known as the Qatar Stars League

== International career ==
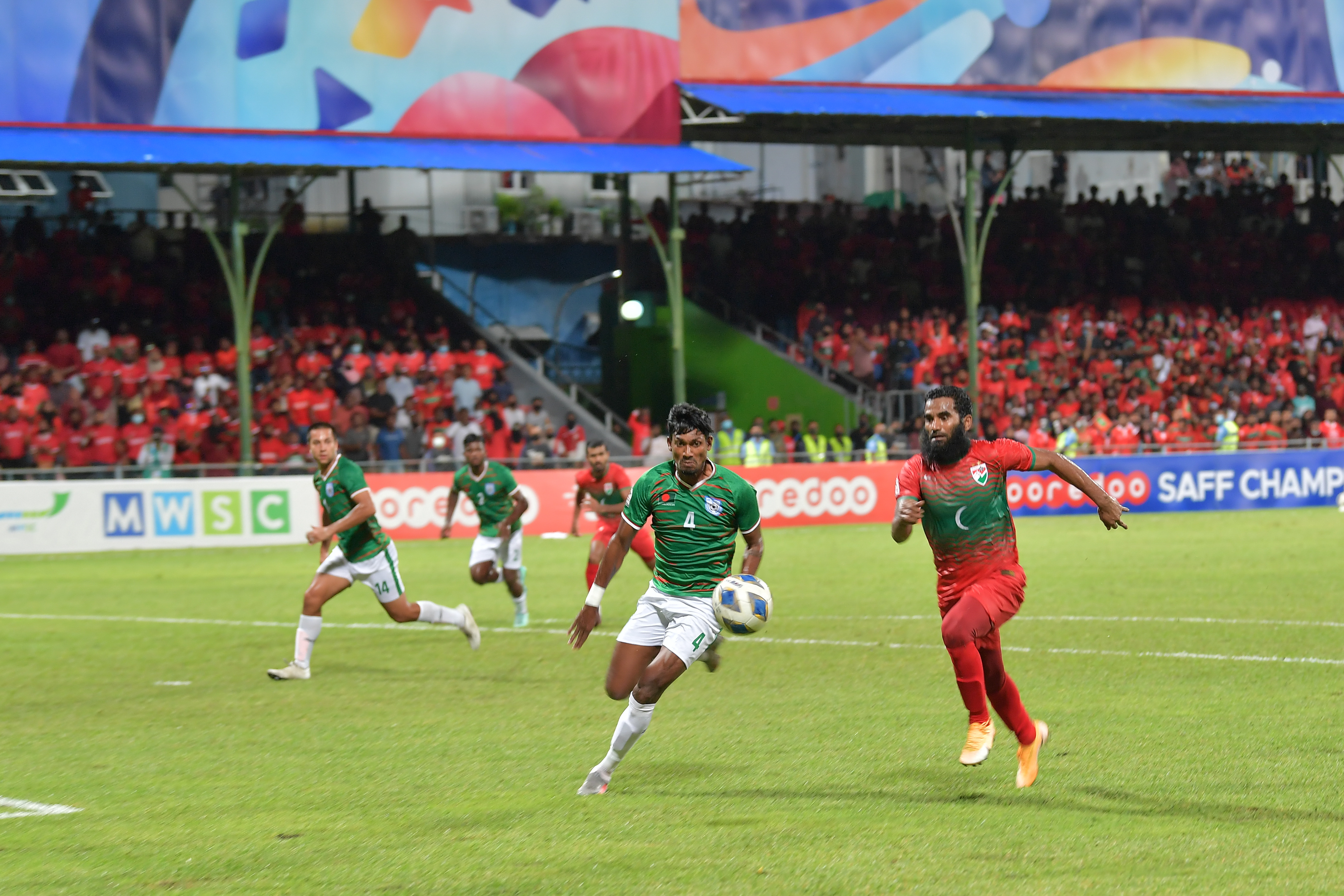
Topu (no.4) in action against Ali Ashfaq of Maldives during the 2021 SAFF Championship.

Topu made his youth international debut during the 2010 AFC U-16 Championship qualifiers. He represented Bangladesh U19 during the 2012 AFC U-19 Championship qualifiers held in Dhaka.

On 24 October 2014, at the age of 19 years, 11 months, and 5 days, Topu made his debut for Bangladesh national team in a friendly match against Sri Lanka. He entered the field as a substitute for defender Yeasin Khan in the 63rd minute of the match which ended as 1–1.

On 28 December 2015, he scored his first goal in international football against Bhutan. Topu was named in the squad for the SAFF Championship: 2018 and had an impressive tournament even though hosts Bangladesh were not able to reach the knockout stages once more. He scored against both Bhutan and Pakistan during the group-stages. Topu also scored a crucial goal against Afghanistan during the 2022 FIFA World Cup qualification helping Bangladesh reach the second round of the 2023 AFC Asian Cup qualifiers

On 1 October 2021, Topu kicked off the 2021 SAFF Championship with a calmly converted penalty against Sri Lanka earning the team a 1–0 victory and a winning start to the tournament. He also played full 90 minutes against Nepal in the final group match of the competition for both sides where Bangladesh needed a win to reach the finals, the match concluded as 1–1, after a controversial late penalty call from the referee which ended Bangladesh's hopes of reaching the finals once again.

On 13 November 2021, during the second matchday of the 2021 Mahinda Rajapaksa Cup, Topu scored an 86th-minute penalty to give Bangladesh a memorable win against Maldives for the first time in 18 years. However, during the last group match against Sri Lanka with Bangladesh only needing a draw, Topu missed a first half penalty and after conceding late into the game Bangladesh suffered a 2–1 defeat, denying the country a place in an international tournament final again.

On 5 June 2026, Topu scored both goals in a 2–1 friendly victory over San Marino, securing Bangladesh's first-ever win against European opposition and their first victory on European soil.

== Personal life ==
Topu is dating Swarnali Krishna, a medical student, since 2015.

Topu is a Hindu.

=== Controversy ===
On 20 September 2023, customs officials at Shahjalal International Airport in Dhaka discovered that Topu and four of his teammates had illegally imported 64 bottles of alcohol. This transgression took place following their return from Maldives, subsequent to Bashundhara Kings suffering a 1–3 defeat at the hands of Maziya in the 2023–24 AFC Cup. Despite the initial indefinite suspension of the players, Topu, who was found to be carrying approximately 26 bottles, was handed a ban lasting two and a half months, until 31 December 2023. Bashundhara Kings lifted Topu's ban on 5 December 2023, after which he resumed training with the club a week later. Topu's ban was lifted on 5 December 2023 by Bashundhara Kings, and he joined the club's training camp a week later. On 22 December 2023, Topu returned to the field during the 2023–24 Bangladesh Premier League season opening game against Brothers Union.

== Career statistics ==
=== International apps ===
As of 6 June 2026.

Bangladesh
Year	Apps	Goals
2014	2	0
2015	12	1
2016	6	0
2018	7	2
2019	1	0
2020	5	0
2021	12	3
2023	8	0
2024	8	0
2025	8	0
2026	1	2
Total	70	8

=== International goals ===
Scores and results list Bangladesh's goal tally first.

#	Date	Venue	Opponent	Score	Result	Competition
1.	28 December 2015	Trivandrum International Stadium, Thiruvananthapuram	Bhutan	1–0	3–0	2015 SAFF Championship
2.	4 September 2018	Bangabandhu National Stadium, Dhaka	Bhutan	1–0	2–0	2018 SAFF Championship
3.	6 September 2018	Bangabandhu National Stadium, Dhaka	Pakistan	1–0	1–0	2018 SAFF Championship
4.	3 June 2021	Jassim Bin Hamad Stadium, Doha	Afghanistan	1–1	1–1	2022 FIFA World Cup qualification
5.	1 October 2021	National Football Stadium, Malé	Sri Lanka	1–0	1–0	2021 SAFF Championship
6.	13 November 2021	Racecourse Ground, Colombo	Maldives	2–1	2–1	2021 Mahinda Rajapaksa Trophy
7.	5 June 2026	San Marino Stadium, Serravalle	San Marino	1–0	2–1	Friendly
8.	5 June 2026	San Marino Stadium, Serravalle	San Marino	2–1	2–1	Friendly

== Honours ==
=== Club ===
Mohammedan SC

- Super Cup: 2013

Abahani Limited Dhaka

- Bangladesh Premier League: 2016
- Federation Cup: 2016, 2018

Bashundhara Kings

- Bangladesh Premier League: 2020–21, 2021–22, 2022–23, 2023–24
- Federation Cup: 2020–21
- Independence Cup: 2022–23, 2023–24
