= Bashundhara Kings Arena =

Football stadium in Dhaka, Bangladesh

Coordinates: 23°49′26″N 90°28′12″E

- Home of Heroes
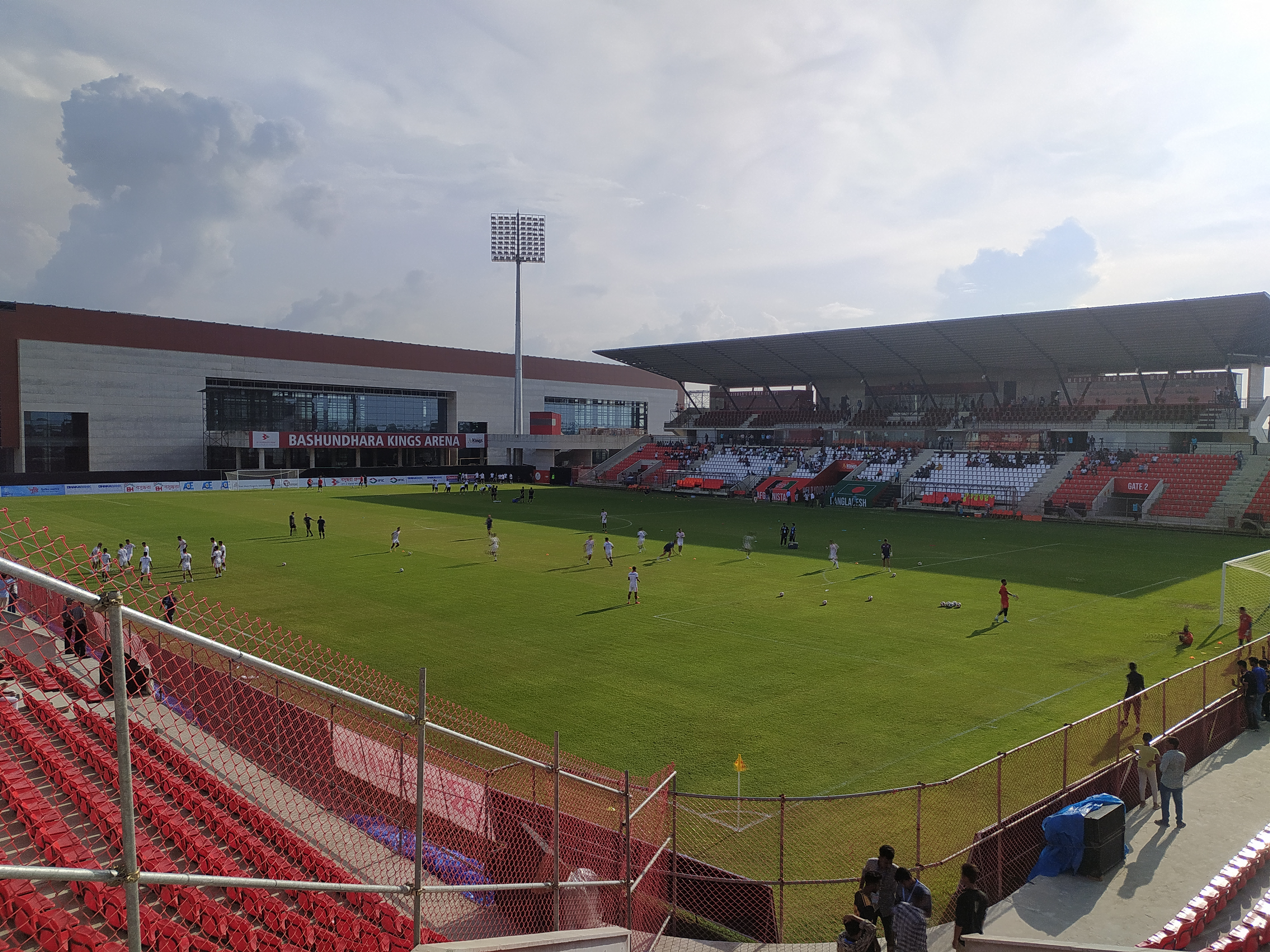
- Kings Arena
- Interactive map of Bashundhara Kings Arena
- Full name: Bashundhara Sports Complex
- Address: Dhaka; Bangladesh
- Location: Bashundhara Sports City, Bashundhara, Dhaka, Bangladesh
- Owner: Bashundhara Group
- Operator: Bashundhara Kings
- Capacity: 6,000; 14,000 (upgradable)
- Executive suites: 3
- Surface: GrassMaster
- Scoreboard: Yes
- Field size: 105 by 68 metres (114.8 yd × 74.4 yd)

Construction
- Opened: 17 February 2022; 4 years ago
- Cost: € 18 million
- Architect: Mohammad Foyez Ullah
- Builder: Bashundhara Group
- Project manager: Maqsud H Bhuiyan
- Main contractor: East West Property Development (Pvt) Limited

Tenants
- Bashundhara Kings (2022–present); Sheikh Russel KC (2022–2024); Bangladesh national football team (2023–present); Fortis FC (2024–present)

Bashundhara Kings Arena (Bengali: বসুন্ধরা কিংস এরিনা), simply known as the Kings Arena, is a football stadium in the Bashundhara Sports City, which is the home of Bashundhara Kings and Fortis. Bashundhara Sports City is located in Dhaka, Bangladesh and is considered to be one of the largest sports complexes in the country. It has been designed by Architect Mohammad Foyez Ullah of Volumezero Limited. The stadium was opened to the public on 17 February 2022. It has an upgradable seating capacity of 14,000. It has a seating capacity of 6,000.

== History ==
The first match, a Bangladesh Premier League fixture between Bashundhara Kings and Bangladesh Police held on 17 February 2022, won by Kings 3–0, with the first-ever goal at the stadium scored by Robson Azevedo da Silva.

On 3 February 2024, Minhajul Abedin Ballu scored the only goal as Mohammedan SC defeated Bashundhara Kings 1–0 in the 2023–24 BPL, marking themselves as the first club to defeat Kings at their home venue and ending an unbeaten home run which stood for 31 games.

== International matches ==
=== Men's ===
On 3 September 2023, the stadium hosted its first international match between Bangladesh and Afghanistan.

Date	Home	Result	Away	Tournament	Spectators
3 September 2023	Bangladesh	0–0	Afghanistan	International friendly	Unknown
7 September 2023	Bangladesh	1–1	Afghanistan	International friendly	Unknown
17 October 2023	Bangladesh	2–1	Maldives	2026 WCQ R1/2027 ACQ	6,729
21 November 2023	Bangladesh	1–1	Lebanon	2026 WCQ R2/2027 ACQ	6,297
26 March 2024	Bangladesh	0–1	Palestine	2026 WCQ R2/2027 ACQ	5,195
6 June 2024	Bangladesh	0–2	Australia	2026 WCQ R2/2027 ACQ	5,227
13 November 2024	Bangladesh	0–1	Maldives	International friendly	Unknown
16 November 2024	Bangladesh	2–1	Maldives	International friendly	Unknown
18 November 2025	Afghanistan	Cancel	Myanmar	2027 ACQ – 3R	–

=== Women's ===
The venue hosted its first women's international match on 31 May 2024 between Bangladesh and Chinese Taipei.

Date	Home	Result	Away	Tournament	Spectators
31 May 2024	Bangladesh	0–4	Chinese Taipei	International friendly	Unknown
3 June 2024	Bangladesh	0–1	Chinese Taipei	International friendly	Unknown

=== U-20 Women's ===
==== 2025 SAFF U-20 Women's Championship ====
It will also hosted the 2025 SAFF U-20 Women's Championship.

Date	Home	Result	Away	Tournament	Spectators
11 July 2025	Bangladesh	9–1	Sri Lanka	SAFF U-20 Women's Championship	1,000
11 July 2025	Bhutan	1–6	Nepal	SAFF U-20 Women's Championship	2,180
13 July 2025	Sri Lanka	0–5	Bhutan	SAFF U-20 Women's Championship	1,020
13 July 2025	Nepal	2–3	Bangladesh	SAFF U-20 Women's Championship	3,150
15 July 2025	Bangladesh	4–1	Bhutan	SAFF U-20 Women's Championship	0
15 July 2025	Sri Lanka	0–7	Nepal	SAFF U-20 Women's Championship	0
17 July 2025	Nepal	7–0	Sri Lanka	SAFF U-20 Women's Championship	0
17 July 2025	Bhutan	0–3	Bangladesh	SAFF U-20 Women's Championship	0
19 July 2025	Nepal	0–8	Bhutan	SAFF U-20 Women's Championship	0
19 July 2025	Sri Lanka	0–5	Bangladesh	SAFF U-20 Women's Championship	0
21 July 2025	Bhutan	5–0	Sri Lanka	SAFF U-20 Women's Championship	0
21 July 2025	Bangladesh	4–0	Nepal	SAFF U-20 Women's Championship	5,374

=== Club International ===
==== AFC Cup ====
The venue served as the home venue for Bashundhara Kings during the 2023–24 AFC Cup, hosting their Group D fixtures.

Date	Home	Result	Away	Tournament	Spectators
2 Oct 2023	(Bangladesh) Bashundhara Kings	3–2	(India) Odisha	2023–24 AFC Cup	7,137
7 Nov 2023	(Bangladesh) Bashundhara Kings	2–1	(India) Mohun Bagan	2023–24 AFC Cup	7,137
27 Nov 2023	(Bangladesh) Bashundhara Kings	2–1	(Maldives) Maziya	2023–24 AFC Cup	6,552

== See also ==
- List of football stadiums in Bangladesh
