= 2023–24 Brothers Union season =

Brothers Union
2023–24 season
- President: Mohiuddin Ahmed Mohi
- Head coach: Faisal Mahmud (until 30 December 2023); Omar Sisse (until 31 January 2024); Ali Asgar Nasir (until 8 February 2024); Azmol Hossain Biddyut (from 9 February 2024)
- Stadium: Muktijuddho Sriti Stadium
- Bangladesh Premier League: 10th
- Federation Cup: Group stage
- Independence Cup: Group stage
- Top goalscorer: League: Md Rabby Hossen Rahul (6 goals); All: Md Rabby Hossen Rahul (6 goals)
- Biggest win: 3–2 v Sheikh Jamal DC (Away); 3 May 2023 (Premier League)
- Biggest defeat: 0–8 v Mohammedan SC (Away); 20 April 2024 (Premier League)

The 2023–24 season was Brothers Union's 14th season in the Bangladesh Premier League and its 1st since suffering relegation in 2020–21. It was also their 41st overall season in the top flight of Bangladeshi football, since debuting in 1975. In addition to domestic league, the club participated in both the Federation Cup and Independence Cup. The season covered the period from 1 August 2023 until 31 May 2024.

== Current squad ==
As of 24 March 2024.

No.	Player	Nat.	Position(s)	Date Of Birth	Year signed	Previous club
Goalkeepers
35	Mojnu Miah	(Bangladesh)	GK	25 May 1997 (aged 26)	2023	Muktijodda Sangsad
37	Md Kamal Hossain Titu	(Bangladesh)	GK	3 September 1989 (aged 34)	2024	AFC Uttara
39	Md Saiful Islam	(Bangladesh)	GK	3 March 1992 (aged 31)	2024	Bashundhara Kings
43	Md Showkat Helal Mia	(Bangladesh)	GK		2024	
Defenders
2	Md Munno Mia	(Bangladesh)	RB/CB	31 December 1996 (aged 26)	2022	AFC Uttara
3	Md Golam Rabby	(Bangladesh)	RB/DM/RW	5 June 2005 (aged 18)	2023	Muktijodda Sangsad
5	Monir Hossain	(Bangladesh)	RB/CB	12 December 1999 (aged 23)	2023	Sheikh Russel KC
12	Md Sabbir Hossain	(Bangladesh)	RB		2022	AFC Uttara
46	Nabil Khandaker Joy	(Bangladesh)	CB	26 November 2000 (aged 22)	2024	
60	Ousman Touray	(The Gambia)	CB	30 November 1997 (aged 25)	2024	(Malta) Birżebbuġa St. Peter's
77	Md Khalil Bhuiyan	(Bangladesh)	RB/LB	6 March 2000 (aged 23)	2024	
Midfielders
16	Mohsin Ahmed	(Bangladesh)	CM/AM	9 January 2005 (aged 18)	2023	Gopalganj SC
17	Md Elias Hossain	(Bangladesh)	CM/AM		2023	NoFeL SC
21	Md Jewel Mollik	(Bangladesh)	DM		2022	Wari Club
23	Shaharier Bappy	(Bangladesh)	RM	24 November 1999 (aged 23)	2023	AFC Uttara
28	Md Shoybur Rahman Mijan	(Bangladesh)	CM	10 March 2002 (aged 21)	2023	
30	Md Foysal	(Bangladesh)	AM		2022	Saif SC Jr.
36	Patrick Sylva	(The Gambia)	AM	22 December 2000 (aged 22)	2024	(The Gambia) Fortune FC
44	Chamir Ullah Rocky	(Bangladesh)	CM	4 February 1999 (aged 24)	2024	Uttara FC
80	Nodir Mavlonov	(Uzbekistan)	DM	28 January 1996 (aged 27)	2024	Sheikh Jamal DC
Forwards
10	Hossain Mohammad Arian	(Bangladesh)	RW	28 January 2006 (aged 17)	2022	Bashundhara Kings Youth
14	Bishal Das	(Bangladesh)	CF/LW	13 February 1994 (aged 29)	2023	Muktijoddha Sangsad
15	Mahbubur Rahman Sufil	(Bangladesh)	CF	10 September 1999 (aged 24)	2023	Mohammedan SC
40	Pape Faye Musa	(The Gambia)	CF	16 August 2005 (aged 18)	2022	
70	Yankuba Jallow	(The Gambia)	CF	16 January 1998 (aged 25)	2024	(The Gambia) Marimoo FC
75	Mbye Faye	(The Gambia)	CF		2024	
90	Eleta Kingsley	(Bangladesh)	CF	29 October 1989 (aged 33)	2024	Chittagong Muktijoddha
Players on loan
7	Akmol Hossain Noyon	(Bangladesh)	DM	7 August 2005 (aged 18)	2022	Bashundhara Kings
9	Mirajul Islam	(Bangladesh)	CF	1 October 2006 (aged 17)	2023	BFF Elite Academy
19	Sirajul Islam Rana	(Bangladesh)	LB/DM	21 November 2006 (aged 16)	2023	BFF Elite Academy
24	Md Imran Khan	(Bangladesh)	CB	12 February 2006 (aged 17)	2023	BFF Elite Academy
27	Md Azizul Hoque Ananto	(Bangladesh)	LB	19 July 2005 (aged 18)	2023	BFF Elite Academy
29	Md Insan Hossain	(Bangladesh)	RW	5 June 2005 (aged 18)	2023	Bashundhara Kings
31	Sree Sumon Soren	(Bangladesh)	RW	11 June 2007 (aged 16)	2023	BFF Elite Academy
33	Md Rabby Hossen Rahul	(Bangladesh)	LW/RW	30 December 2006 (aged 16)	2023	Bashundhara Kings
Left during the season
1	Md Mohiuddin Ranu	(Bangladesh)	GK	11 May 2001 (aged 22)	2018	
13	Sobuj Das Raghu	(Bangladesh)	GK	12 May 1991 (aged 32)	2023	Sheikh Russel KC
22	Mithun Khalifa	(Bangladesh)	GK		2022	Gopalganj SC
4	Essa Jallow	(The Gambia)	CB	14 August 2000 (aged 23)	2023	(The Gambia) Real de Banjul FC
25	Khalekurzaman Sabuj	(Bangladesh)	LB	22 December 1995 (aged 27)	2023	Sheikh Russel KC
26	Md Ibrahim Khalil	(Bangladesh)	CB/DM		2022	Agrani Bank Ltd. SC
6	Fazlay Rabbi	(Bangladesh)	DM	16 May 1996 (aged 27)	2023	Muktijodda Sangsad
8	Otabek Valizhonov	(Uzbekistan)	AM/RW/LW	8 April 1989 (aged 34)	2023	Sheikh Jamal Dhanmondi
10	Mostafa Kahraba	(Egypt)	AM	10 November 1987 (aged 35)	2023	Chittagong Abahani
50	Md Rabbi Hossain	(Bangladesh)	AM		2023	
63	Bunyod Shodiev	(Uzbekistan)	DM	7 June 1997 (aged 26)	2023	Rahmatganj MFS
20	Rubel Miya	(Bangladesh)	RW/CF	1 January 1995 (aged 28)	2023	Muktijoddha Sangsad
32	Md Sohag Hossain	(Bangladesh)	CF/AM		2022	Fakirerpool YMC
18	Md Rubel Shaikh	(Bangladesh)	RWB/RB/RW	10 June 2006 (aged 17)	2023	BFF Elite Academy

== Transfer ==
=== In ===
No.	Pos	Player	Previous club	Fee	Date	Source
15	FW	Mahbubur Rahman Sufil	Mohammedan SC	Free	1 October 2023	
6	MF	Fazlay Rabbi	Muktijoddha Sangsad	Free	1 October 2023	
20	FW	Rubel Miya	Muktijoddha Sangsad	Free	1 October 2023	
35	GK	Mojnu Miah	Muktijoddha Sangsad	Free	1 October 2023	
3	DF	Md Golam Rabby	Muktijoddha Sangsad	Free	1 October 2023	
25	DF	Khalekurzaman Sabuj	Sheikh Russel KC	Free	1 October 2023	
5	DF	Monir Hossain	Sheikh Russel KC	Free	1 October 2023	
16	MF	Mohsin Ahmed	Gopalganj SC	Free	1 October 2023	
13	GK	Sobuj Das Raghu	Sheikh Russel KC	Free	1 October 2023	
23	MF	Shaharier Bappy	AFC Uttara	Free	1 October 2023	
63	MF	(Uzbekistan) Bunyod Shodiev	Rahmatganj MFS	Free	1 October 2023	
10	MF	(Egypt) Mostafa Kahraba	Chittagong Abahani	Free	1 October 2023	
8	MF	(Uzbekistan) Otabek Valizhonov	Sheikh Jamal Dhanmondi	Free	1 October 2023	
14	FW	Bishal Das	Free agent	Free	1 October 2023	
37	GK	Md Kamal Hossain Titu	AFC Uttara	Free	1 March 2024	
39	GK	Md Saiful Islam	Bashundhara Kings	Free	1 March 2024	
43	GK	Md Showkat Helal Mia	Free agent	Free	1 March 2024	
40	DF	(The Gambia) Pape Faye Musa	Free agent	Free	1 March 2024	
46	DF	Nabil Khandaker Joy	Free agent	Free	1 March 2024	
77	DF	Md Khalil Bhuiyan	Free agent	Free	1 March 2024	
44	MF	Chamir Ullah Rocky	Uttara FC	Free	1 March 2024	
80	MF	(Uzbekistan) Nodir Mavlonov	Free agent	Free	1 March 2024	
60	FW	(The Gambia) Ousman Touray	(Malta) Birżebbuġa St. Peter's	Free	1 March 2024	
70	FW	(The Gambia) Yankuba Jallow	(The Gambia) Marimoo FC	Free	1 March 2024	
75	FW	(The Gambia) Mbye Faye	Free agent	Free	1 March 2024	
90	FW	Eleta Kingsley	Free agent	Free	1 March 2024	

=== Loans in ===
No.	Pos	Player	From	Fee	Date	On loan until	Source
24	DF	Md Imran Khan	BFF Elite Academy	Tk 4 lakh	26 August 2023	23 July 2024	
27	DF	Azizul Haque Anonto	BFF Elite Academy	Tk 10 lakh	26 August 2023	1 June 2024	
31	FW	Sree Sumon Soren	BFF Elite Academy	Tk 4 lakh	26 August 2023	1 June 2024	
19	DF	Sirajul Islam Rana	BFF Elite Academy	Tk 4 lakh	26 August 2023	1 June 2024	
9	FW	Mirajul Islam	BFF Elite Academy	Tk 6.5 lakh	26 August 2023	1 June 2024	
18	DF	Md Rubel Shaikh	BFF Elite Academy	Tk 4 lakh	26 August 2023	1 June 2024	
33	FW	Md Rabby Hossen Rahul	Bashundhara Kings	Free	1 October 2023	1 June 2024	
7	FW	Akmol Hossain Noyon	Bashundhara Kings	Free	1 October 2023	1 June 2024	

=== Out ===
No.	Pos	Player	Moved to	Fee	Date	Source
9	FW	Md Jakir Hossain Ziku	Free agent	Released	1 May 2023	
10	MF	Md Sayedul Morsalin	Free agent	Released	1 May 2023	
7	DF	Krishno Mali	Free agent	Released	1 May 2023	
40	FW	Afroz Ali	Free agent	Released	1 May 2023	
39	DF	Md Moshrur Rahman	Free agent	Released	1 May 2023	
33	FW	Mohon Akondo	Free agent	Released	1 May 2023	
22	GK	Jafor Sardar	Free agent	Released	1 May 2023	
23	DF	Rubel Mia	Free agent	Released	1 May 2023	
26	MF	Md Ripon Hossain	Free agent	Released	1 May 2023	
37	FW	Md Prince	Free agent	Released	1 May 2023	
8	MF	Md Saiful Islam	Free agent	Released	1 May 2023	
18	MF	Md Shoriful Islam	Free agent	Released	1 May 2023	
6	MF	Md Saddam Hossain	Free agent	Released	1 May 2023	
19	FW	Imran Hossain	Free agent	Released	1 May 2023	
1	GK	Md Mohiuddin Ranu	Free agent	Released	1 March 2024	
13	GK	Sobuj Das Raghu	Free agent	Released	1 March 2024	
22	GK	Mithun Khalifa	Free agent	Released	1 March 2024	
4	DF	(The Gambia) Essa Jallow	Free agent	Released	1 March 2024	
25	DF	Khalekurzaman Sabuj	Free agent	Released	1 March 2024	
26	DF	Md Ibrahim Khalil	Free agent	Released	1 March 2024	
6	MF	Fazlay Rabbi	Free agent	Released	1 March 2024	
8	MF	(Uzbekistan) Otabek Valizhonov	Free agent	Released	1 March 2024	
10	MF	(Egypt) Mostafa Kahraba	Free agent	Released	1 March 2024	
50	MF	Md Rabbi Hossain	Free agent	Released	1 March 2024	
63	MF	(Uzbekistan) Bunyod Shodiev	Free agent	Released	1 March 2024	
20	FW	Rubel Miya	Free agent	Released	1 March 2024	
32	FW	Md Sohag Hossain	Free agent	Released	1 March 2024	
18	DF	Md Rubel Shaikh	BFF Elite Academy	End of loan	1 March 2024	

== Competitions ==
Win Draw Loss Fixtures

=== Overall ===
Competition	First match	Last match	Final Position
BPL	23 December 2023	29 May 2024	10th
Federation Cup	25 December 2023	13 February 2024	Group stage
Independence Cup	27 October 2023	30 October 2023	Group stage

=== Overview ===
Competition	Record							
Competition	Pld	W	D	L	GF	GA	GD	Win %
BPL	18	1	4	13	21	66	−45	5.56
Federation Cup	3	0	0	3	1	11	−10	0.00
Independence Cup	2	0	0	2	0	6	−6	0.00
Total	23	1	4	18	22	83	−61	4.35

Source: Soccerway

=== Premier League ===
==== League table ====
Pos	Team	Pld	W	D	L	GF	GA	GD	Pts
6	Sheikh Russel KC	18	4	7	7	20	24	−4	19
7	Chittagong Abahani	18	4	7	7	22	29	−7	19
8	Sheikh Jamal DC	18	4	5	9	14	24	−10	17
9	Rahmatganj MFS	18	2	10	6	19	26	−7	16
10	Brothers Union	18	1	4	13	21	66	−45	7

Source: Soccerway
Rules for classification: 1) Points; 2) Goal difference; 3) Goals scored.

==== Results by round ====
Round	1	2	3	4	5	6	7	8	9	10	11	12	13	14	15	16	17	18
Ground	A	A	H	A	H	A	H	A	H	H	H	A	H	A	H	A	H	A
Result	L	D	L	D	L	D	L	L	L	L	L	L	L	W	D	L	L	L
Position	10	9	10	10	10	10	10	10	10	10	10	10	10	10	10	10	10	10

Source: Matches
A = Away; H = Home; W = Win; D = Draw; L = Loss; P = Postponed

==== Results summary ====
Overall								Home						Away					
Pld	W	D	L	GF	GA	GD	Pts	W	D	L	GF	GA	GD	W	D	L	GF	GA	GD
18	1	4	13	21	66	−45	7	0	1	8	8	32	−24	1	3	5	13	34	−21

Source: Soccerway

=== Matches ===
22 December 2023 1	Bashundhara Kings	5–2	Brothers Union	Dhaka
16:30 BST (UTC+6)	Rakib 8'; Dorielton (yellow card) 51' (goal) 58', 61'; Gafurov (yellow card) 79'; Robinho 89'; Ibrahim 90+4'	Report	Khalil (yellow card) 66'; Rahul 69'; Otabek 90+2'	Stadium: Bashundhara Kings Arena; Referee: Bituraj Barua

29 December 2023 2	Brothers Union	2–2	Rahmatganj MFS	Munshigonj
14:30 BST (UTC+6)	Otabek 18' (pen.); Insan (yellow card) 31'; Sufil 67'; Kahraba (yellow card) 72'	Report	Boateng 25' (yellow card) 34'; Juel 89'	Stadium: Shaheed Bir Sreshtho Flight Lieutenant Matiur Rahman Stadium; Referee: Golam Mourshed Chowdhury Nayan

12 January 2024 3	Brothers Union	1–5	Mohammedan SC	Rajshahi
14:45 BST (UTC+6)	Shoybur (yellow card) 14'; Otabek (yellow card) 22'; Noyon 78'	Report	Minhajul (yellow card) 10'; Diabate 28' (pen.), 68'; Jafar (yellow card) 45+5'; Muzaffarov 49'; Sunday 60', 66'; Kamrul (yellow card) 90'	Stadium: Muktijuddho Sriti Stadium; Referee: Jasim Akhter

20 January 2024 4	Chittagong Abahani	2–2	Brothers Union	Munshigonj
14:45 BST (UTC+6)	Faysal (yellow card) 15'; Jahedul (yellow card) 45'; Rabby 80'; Nasir 81'	Report	Sufil 12', 53'; Shodiev (yellow card) 45'; Kahraba (yellow card) 67'	Stadium: Shaheed Bir Sreshtho Flight Lieutenant Matiur Rahman Stadium; Referee: Bituraj Barua

26 January 2024 5	Brothers Union	0–2	Sheikh Jamal DC	Rajshahi
14:45 BST (UTC+6)	Shoybur (yellow card) 38'; Otabek (yellow card) 39'; Noyon (yellow card) 67'; Ranu (yellow card) 89'	Report	Shaeid (yellow card) 20'; Barua (yellow card) 28'; Sazzad 73', 90+3'; Fahim (yellow card) 90+5'	Stadium: Muktijuddho Sriti Stadium; Referee: MZF Nahid

3 February 2024 6	Fortis FC	2–2	Brothers Union	Rajshahi
15:00 BST (UTC+6)	Babou 41' (pen.); Roman (yellow card) 53'; Valeriy 78'	Report	Rahul 8'; Monir (yellow card) 52'; Otabek (yellow card) 63'; Sufil 69'	Stadium: Muktijuddho Sriti Stadium; Referee: Bhubon Mohon Tarafder

9 February 2024 7	Brothers Union	2–3	Dhaka Abahani	Rajshahi
:1500 BST (UTC+6)	Ranu (yellow card) 45'; Insan 59'; Rahul 90+3'; Otabek (yellow card) 64' (red card) 90+5'	Report	Fernandes 7'; Brandão 36'; Cornelius 48'; Papon (yellow card) 90+4'	Stadium: Muktijuddho Sriti Stadium; Referee: Sabuj Das

17 February 2024 8	Sheikh Russel KC	4–1	Brothers Union	Dhaka
15:00 BST (UTC+6)	Reza 5'; Landry 37', 39', 59'; Shahin (yellow card) 89'	Report	Noyon (yellow card) 43'; Insan (yellow card) 45+1'; Rahul 70'; Shoybur (yellow card) 90+3'	Stadium: Bashundhara Kings Arena; Referee: Md Mizanur Rahman

24 February 2024 9	Brothers Union	1–4	Police FC	Rajshahi
15:00 BST (UTC+6)	Rahul 43'; Insan (yellow card) 73'	Report	Quazem 45+2'; García 52', 72', 79'; Mithu (yellow card) 75' (yellow-red card) 87'	Stadium: Muktijuddho Sriti Stadium; Referee: MZF Nahid

30 March 2024 10	Brothers Union	1–7	Bashundhara Kings	Rajshahi
14:45 BST (UTC+6)	Eleta 45+2'	Report	Saad 19'; Robinho 30'; Figueira 37', 58'; Mfon 41', 68'; Sohel 51'	Stadium: Muktijuddho Sriti Stadium; Referee: Golam Mourshed Chowdhury Nayan

5 April 2024 11	Brothers Union	0–2	Rahmatganj MFS	Rajshahi
15:15 BST (UTC+6)	Munno (yellow card) 35'; Insan (yellow card) 64'	Report	Kahraba 44'; Sushanto (yellow card) 46'; Boateng (yellow card) 37' (goal) 85'	Stadium: Muktijuddho Sriti Stadium; Referee: MZF Nahid

20 April 2024 12	Mohammedan SC	8–0	Brothers Union	Mymensingh
15:45 BST (UTC+6)	Sunday (yellow card) 19'; Emon 34'; Diabate 43', 45+2', 68', 72', 89'; Jewel 75'; Emmanuel 87'	Report	Saiful (yellow card) 13'	Stadium: Rafiq Uddin Bhuiyan Stadium; Referee: Md Jalal Uddin

27 April 2024 13	Brothers Union	0–5	Chittagong Abahani	Rajshahi
15:15 BST (UTC+6)		Report	Nasir 18'; Komolafe 32', 90+2'; Sagor 60'; Ifegwu 74' (pen.)	Stadium: Muktijuddho Sriti Stadium; Referee: MZF Nahid

3 May 2024 14	Sheikh Jamal DC	2–3	Brothers Union	Gopalganj
16:00 BST (UTC+6)	Higor 72' (pen.); Shakhzod 75'	Report	Touray (yellow card) 24'; Eleta 45'; Ananto (yellow card) 50'; Mbye (yellow card) 54'; Mohsin 84'; Mavlyanov (yellow card) 87'; Rahul 89'; Mirajul (yellow card) 90+2'	Stadium: Sheikh Fazlul Haque Mani Stadium; Referee: Taposh Roy

11 May 2024 15	Brothers Union	1–1	Fortis FC	Rajshahi
16:00 BST (UTC+6)	Touray (yellow card) 34'; Mavlyanov (yellow card) 48'; Noyon 73'	Report	Mona (yellow card) 19'; Sarr 39' (yellow card) 39'; Valeriy (yellow card) 55'; Jumaev (yellow card) 83'	Stadium: Muktijuddho Sriti Stadium; Referee: Alomgir Sarker

17 May 2024 16	Dhaka Abahani	7–1	Brothers Union	Gopalganj
16:00 BST (UTC+6)	Stewart 70', 86', 90', 90+4'; Washington 10', 64'; Shakir (yellow card) 59'; Papon (yellow card) 67'; Maraz 90+2'; Jamal (yellow card) 90+3'	Report	Mbye (yellow card) 45+3' (red card) 50'; Mavlyanov 79' (pen.)	Stadium: Sheikh Fazlul Haque Mani Stadium; Referee: Nazmul Huda

25 May 2024 17	Brothers Union	2–3	Sheikh Russel KC	Rajshahi
16:00 BST (UTC+6)	Eleta 6', 18'; Mavlyanov (yellow card) 74'; Mbye (red card) 52'	Report	Sumon 9'; Umarjonov 11'; Chandon 31'; Stepanenko (red card) 52'	Stadium: Muktijuddho Sriti Stadium; Referee: Arisuz Rahman Sagor

29 May 2024 18	Police FC	2–0	Brothers Union	Mymensingh
16:00 BST (UTC+6)	Azamat 32'; Ismail (yellow card) 36'; Sokhibov (yellow card) 43'; Din Islam 48'	Report		Stadium: Rafiq Uddin Bhuiyan Stadium; Referee: SM Jashim Akhter

=== Independence Cup ===
Pos	Team	Pld	W	D	L	GF	GA	GD	Pts	Qualification
1	Bangladesh Police FC	2	2	0	0	3	0	+3	6	Advance to Knockout stage
2	Sheikh Jamal DC	2	1	0	1	4	1	+3	3	Advance to Knockout stage
3	Brothers Union	2	0	0	2	0	6	−6	0	

Source: GSA
Rules for classification: Group stage tiebreakers

27 October 2023 1	Bangladesh Police FC	2–0	Brothers Union	Munshiganj
14:30 BST (UTC+6)	Karipov 23'; Ibargüen García 67'	Report		Stadium: Shaheed Bir Sreshtho Flight Lieutenant Matiur Rahman Stadium; Referee: Saymoon Hasan Sany

30 October 2023 2	Brothers Union	0–4	Sheikh Jamal DC	Dhaka
14:30 BST (UTC+6)	Sabuj (yellow card) 34'; Rabby (yellow card) 85'	Report	Leite 11', 36'; Díaz 59'; Sazzad 73'	Stadium: Bashundhara Kings Arena; Referee: Md Alamgir Sarker

=== Federation Cup ===
Pos	Team	Pld	W	D	L	GF	GA	GD	Pts	Qualification
1	Mohammedan SC	3	3	0	0	6	3	+3	9	Advance to Knockout stage
2	Abahani Limited Dhaka	3	2	0	1	10	2	+8	6	Advance to Knockout stage
3	Chittagong Abahani	3	1	0	2	4	5	−1	3	
4	Brothers Union	3	0	0	3	1	11	−10	0	

Source: Soccerway
Rules for classification: Group stages tiebreakers

16 January 2024 1	Dhaka Abahani	6–0	Brothers Union	Dhaka
14:45 BST (UTC+6)	Jibon 17'; Brandāo 31', 72', 73'; Alomgir (yellow card) 79'; Stewart 83', 86'	Report	Otabek (yellow card) 69'; Kahraba (yellow card) 79'	Stadium: Bashundhara Kings Arena; Referee: Sabuj Das

30 January 2024 2	Mohammedan SC	2–1	Brothers Union	Gopalganj
14:45 BST (UTC+6)	Diabate (yellow card) 57'; Sourav 66'; Jafar 85'	Report	Otabek (yellow card) 33' (goal) 69'	Stadium: Sheikh Fazlul Haque Mani Stadium; Referee: Md Anisur Rahman Sagor

13 February 2024 2	Brothers Union	0–3	Chittagong Abahani	Munshigonj
14:45 BST (UTC+6)	A. Noyon (yellow card) 45+3'	Report	Shakil 8', 20'; Emtiyaz (yellow card) 62'; Saymon 72'	Stadium: Shaheed Bir Sreshtho Flight Lieutenant Matiur Rahman Stadium; Referee: Md Jalal Uddin

== Statistics ==
=== Goalscorers ===
Rank	No.	Pos.	Nat.	Player	BPL	Federation Cup	Independence Cup	Total
1	33	FW	(Bangladesh)	Md Rabby Hossen Rahul	6	0	0	6
2	15	FW	(Bangladesh)	Mahbubur Rahman Sufil	4	0	0	4
2	90	FW	(Bangladesh)	Eleta Kingsley	4	0	0	4
4	8	MF	(Uzbekistan)	Otabek Valizhonov	2	1	0	3
5	7	MF	(Bangladesh)	Akmol Hossain Noyon	2	0	0	2
6	29	FW	(Bangladesh)	Md Insan Hossain	1	0	0	1
6	16	MF	(Bangladesh)	Mohsin Ahmed	1	0	0	1
6	80	DF	(Uzbekistan)	Nodir Mavlonov	1	0	0	1
Total					21	1	0	22

Source: Matches
