= 2025–26 Dhaka Second Division Football League =

Dhaka Second Division Football League
- Season: 2025–26
- Dates: 3 July–17 August 2026
- Champions: BKSP
- Promoted: BKSP; Purbachal Parishad
- Relegated: Kollol Sangha; Elias Ahmed Chowdhury Srity Songsod
- Matches: 91
- Goals: 219 (2.41 per match)
- Top goalscorer: (Bangladesh) Parvej Ahmed (Purbachal Parishad) (10 goals)
- Highest scoring: BKSP Football Club 5–3 Victoria Sporting Club (12 July 2026); Kingstar Sporting Club 5–3 Kollol Sangha (28 July 2026); Jahid Ahsan Sohel KC 5–2 Kingstar Sporting Club (19 July 2026); Purbachal Parishad 6–0 Elias Ahmed Chowdhury Srity Songsod (14 August 2026)
- Longest winning run: BKSP Football Club (4 matches)
- Longest unbeaten run: BKSP Football Club; Gouripur Sporting Club (4 matches)
- Longest winless run: Kollol Sangha (5 matches)
- Longest losing run: Kollol Sangha (5 matches)

The 2025–26 Dhaka Second Division Football League, also known as the Paragon Daily Second Division U18 Football League for sponsorship reason, was the 48th edition of the country's fourth-tier football league. The season commences on 3 July and concluded on 16 August 2026. A total fourteen clubs were participated in the league. It is also the first edition of the league to be held in the U18 format.

Jatrabari JS is the defending champion having won the title in the 2022–23 season and were promoted to the 2023–24 Dhaka Senior Division League along with runner-up, Arambagh FA. Notably the 2024–25 Dhaka Second Division Football League was not held.

== Promotion and relegation ==
The following teams have changed division since the previous season:

=== Entered ===
- Teams relegated from the Senior Division (2024–25)
  - No teams were relegated as the 2024–25 Dhaka Senior Division Football League was not held. However Jatrabari JS were relegated to the Second Division after not participating in the 2025–26 Dhaka Senior Division Football League.
- Teams promoted from the Third Division (2022–23)
  - Chawkbazar Kings
  - Elias Ahmed Chowdhury SS
- Note: The 2024–25 Dhaka Third Division Football League was not held and neither was the 2024–25 Dhaka Second Division Football League.

=== Left ===
- Teams promoted from the Second Division (2021–22)
  - Jatrabari JS
  - Arambagh FA
- Teams relegated from the Second Division (2021–22)
  - Kadamtola Sangsad
  - City Club (Note: City Club were given permission to enter the professional second-tier league, the Bangladesh Championship League from the 2024–25 season)

== Participating clubs ==
The following fourteen teams are participating in the league.

Team	Location
BG Press S&RC	Dhaka
Bangladesh Krira Shikkha Protishtan	(Savar), Dhaka
Chakwkbazar Kings	Chawkbazar, Dhaka
Dilkusha Sporting Club	(Dilkusha), Dhaka
Elias Ahmed Chowdhury Srity Sangsod	Dhaka
Gouripur Sporting Club	(Daudkandi), Comilla
Jabid Ahsan Sohel Krira Chakra	Dhaka
Jatrabari Jhatika Sangsad	Jatrabari, Dhaka
Khilgaon Football Academy	Khilgaon, Dhaka
Kallol Sangha	Chittagong
Kingstar Sporting Club	Dhaka
Purbachal Parishad	Dhaka
Tongi Krira Chakra	(Tongi), Gazipur
Victoria Sporting Club	Dhaka

== Personnel and sponsoring ==
Team	Head Coach	Captain
Bangladesh Press Sports & Recreation Club	(Bangladesh) Md Shahadat Hossain	(Bangladesh) Md Asaduzzaman Munna
Bangladesh Krira Shikkha Protishtan football team	(Bangladesh) SM Imrul Hasan	(Bangladesh) Jayed Bin Maruf Himel
Chakwkbazar Kings	(Bangladesh) Naymur Rashed Shahed	(Bangladesh) Md Sourob Mollik
Dilkusha Sporting Club	(Bangladesh) Md Monowar Hossain	(Bangladesh) Sourov Al Adi
Elias Ahmed Chowdhury Srity Sangsod	(Bangladesh) Md Monir Hossain	(Bangladesh) Md Jihad
Gouripur Sporting Club	(Bangladesh) Md Harun	(Bangladesh) Efthekar Ahmed Sany
Jabid Ahsan Sohel Krira Chakra	(Bangladesh) Abadat Hossain	(Bangladesh) Mohammed Shahed Hossin
Jatrabari Jhatika Sangsod	(Bangladesh) Md Shahidul Islam	(Bangladesh) Rakib Rakib
Khilgaon Football Academy	(Bangladesh) Mohammad Mamun	(Bangladesh) Rabbi Hasan Mehedi Khan
Kallol Sangha	(Bangladesh) Md Kasem	(Bangladesh) Nobo Sarder
Kingstar Sporting Club	(Bangladesh) Mohammad Ashraful Haque	(Bangladesh) Md Maruf Hasan Fahim
Purbachal Parishad	(Bangladesh) Arman Hossain	(Bangladesh) Md Mohin Ahmmed
Tongi Krira Chakra	(Bangladesh) Imtiaj Khan Lablu	(Bangladesh) Opurbo
Victoria Sporting Club	(Bangladesh) Md Murad Ahmed Milon	(Bangladesh) Atikur Rahman Ayon

== Venue ==
All games were played at the BSSS Mostafa Kamal Stadium in Dhaka, Bangladesh.

Dhaka	Dhaka is located in Bangladesh
BSSS Mostafa Kamal Stadium	Dhaka is located in Bangladesh
Capacity: 25,000	Dhaka is located in Bangladesh

== League table ==
Pos	Team	Pld	W	D	L	GF	GA	GD	Pts	Qualification
1	BKSP FT	13	9	3	1	23	11	+12	30	Qualification for the 2026–27 Senior Division League
2	Purbachal Parishad	13	8	4	1	35	6	+29	28	Qualification for the 2026–27 Senior Division League
3	Gouripur SC	13	7	3	3	20	10	+10	24	
4	Chakwkbazar Kings	13	5	5	3	14	10	+4	20	
5	Tongi KC	13	5	5	3	17	12	+5	20	
6	Jabid Ahsan Sohel KC	13	5	4	4	21	20	+1	19	
7	Kingstar SC	13	5	4	4	21	19	+2	19	
8	Dilkusha SC	13	5	3	5	18	13	+5	18	
9	Victoria SC	13	4	3	6	14	19	−5	15	
10	Jatrabari JS	13	2	6	5	13	19	−6	12	
11	BG Press S&RC	13	3	3	7	9	17	−8	12	
12	Khilgaon FA	13	2	5	6	5	17	−12	11	
13	Kallol Sangha	13	2	4	7	11	24	−13	10	Relegation to Third Division League
14	Elias Ahmed Chowdhury SS	13	1	4	8	4	28	−24	7	Relegation to Third Division League

Source: Sofascore

=== Results ===
No Home \ No Away	BGP	BKSP	CK	DSC	EACSS	GSC	JASKC	JJS	KS	KFA	KSC	PP	TKC	VSC
BG Press S&RC	—		0–1	2–0		0–3		1–1				1–4		2–0
Bangladesh Krira Shikkha Protishtan	2–1	—	2–0				2–0		0–0	0–0	2–1		1–1	
Chakwkbazar Kings			—		0–0		1–2		2–1			1–1	2–1	0–0
Dilkusha Sporting Club		0–2	0–1	—	5–0	2–0		0–0				0–0		4–0
Elias Ahmed Chowdhury Srity Sangsod	0–0	0–3			—	0–4		0–3		0–1	0–1			
Gouripur Sporting Club		1–2	1–0			—		1–0				0–3	0–0	2–1
Jabid Ahsan Sohel Krira Chakra	2–0			2–2		0–4	—		3–0	1–1				0–1
Jatrabari Jhatika Sangsad		1–2	1–1				1–1	—	0–1	1–1	2–2		1–2	
Kallal Sangha	1–2			0–2	1–1	1–1			—			0–5		0–2
Khilgaon Football Academy	1–0		0–4	0–2		0–2			0–0	—	1–2		0–3	
Kingstar Sporting Club	2–0		1–1	3–1		1–1	2–5		5–3		—			
Purbachal Parishad		3–0			6–0		4–1	6–0		0–0	1–0	—	1–2	
Tongi Krira Chakra	0–0			3–0	0–0		1–1		2–0		2–1		—	
Victoria Sporting Club		3–5			1–2			1–2		2–0	0–0	1–1	2–1	—

Source: Sofascore
Legend: Blue = left column team win; Yellow = draw; Red = top row team win.

=== Result by rounds ===
Team ╲ Round	1	2	3	4	5	6	7	8	9	10	11	12	13
BG Press S&RC	L	L	W	D	D	L	L	D	L	L	W	L	W
Bangladesh Krira Shikkha Protishtan	W	W	W	W	L	D	W	W	W	W	D	W	D
Chakwkbazar Kings	D	W	D	D	W	W	W	L	L	W	D	D	L
Dilkusha SC	L	W	L	L	D	D	W	D	W	L	L	L	W
Elias Ahmed Chowdhury Srity Sangsod	D	L	L	D	D	D	L	L	L	L	W	L	L
Gouripur Sporting Club	D	W	W	L	D	W	W	W	W	D	W	L	L
Jabid Ahsan Sohel Krira Chakra	W	D	L	L	D	D	L	D	L	W	D	W	W
Jatrabari Jhatika Sangsad	D	W	D	D	L	L	L	D	D	W	D	L	L
Khilgaon Football Academy	D	L	W	L	W	L	W	D	L	D	L	D	D
Kalollol Sangha	D	L	L	L	D	D	L	L	L	L	L	D	W
Kingstar Sporting Club	D	L	W	W	D	L	L	W	D	W	D	W	L
Purbachal Parishad	D	W	L	W	W	D	W	D	W	D	W	W	W
Tongi Krira Chakra	L	D	W	W	W	D	L	D	W	D	D	W	W
Victoria Sporting Club	W	L	L	L	D	W	W	D	W	L	L	D	L

Source: Sofascore
W = Win; D = Draw; L = Lose

=== Positions by round ===
Team ╲ Round	1	2	3	4	5	6	7	8	9	10	11	12	13
BG Press S&RC	14	12	12	11	10	10	13	13	12	12	12	12	11
BKSP	2	1	1	1	1	1	1	1	1	1	1	1	1
Chakwkbazar Kings	8	5	4	8	3	4	2	4	5	4	4	4	4
Dilkusha SC	13	8	11	7	6	8	5	5	4	6	6	8	8
Elias Ahmed Chowdhury Srity Sangsod	6	11	14	13	14	14	14	14	14	14	13	14	14
Gouripur Sporting Club	10	6	2	4	4	3	4	2	2	2	2	3	3
Jabid Ahsan Sohel Krira Chakra	1	4	9	10	9	6	7	8	9	9	9	7	6
Jatrabari JS	4	2	3	6	8	11	11	11	11	10	10	10	10
Khilgaon Football Academy	5	12	8	9	12	13	10	10	10	11	11	11	12
Kallol Sangha	7	11	13	14	11	12	12	12	13	13	14	13	13
Kingstar Sporting Club	11	9	6	5	5	7	9	6	8	5	5	5	7
Purbachal Parishad	9	3	5	2	2	2	2	3	3	3	3	2	2
Tongi Krira Chakra	12	10	7	3	7	5	8	9	7	8	8	6	5
Victoria Sporting Club	3	7	10	12	13	9	6	7	6	7	7	9	9

Leader & Champion
Runner Up

Source: Sofascore

== Season statistics ==
=== Scoring ===
- First goal of the season:
  (Bangladesh) MD Shahria Sazzad Siyam (Jatrabari Jhatika Sangsod) against (Khilgaon Football Academy) on (3 July 2026)

=== Goalscorers ===
There have been 219 goals scored in 91 matches, for an average of 2.41 goals per match.

10 goals

- (Bangladesh) Md Parvez Ahmed (Purbachal Parishad)

9 goals

- (Bangladesh) Yeasin Arafat (BKSP Football Club)

6 goals

- (Bangladesh) Md Mohin Ahmmed (Purbachal Parishad)
- (Bangladesh) Md Mahfuz Alam (Gouripur Sporting Club)
- (Bangladesh) Md Tamim (Jahid Ahsan Sohel Krira Chakra)

5 goals

- (Bangladesh) Md Monir Hossain (Chawkbazar Kings)
- (Bangladesh) Ariful Islam Rana (Kingstar Sporting Club)
- (Bangladesh) Saif Hossain (Tongi Krira Chakra)

4 goals

- (Bangladesh) Samir Ahmed ( Dilkusha Sporting Club)
- (Bangladesh) Sagor (Victoria Sporting Club)
- (Bangladesh) Abu Hena Musiafa Kamal (Jahid Ahsan Sohel Krira Chakra)
- (Bangladesh) Md Shaddin Hasan Sihab (BKSP Football Club)
- (Bangladesh) Md Pavel Mia (Purbachal Parishad)
- (Bangladesh) Md Emon Mia (Purbachal Parishad)

3 goals

- (Bangladesh) Md Shibon Mia Iqbal (Gouripur Sporting Club)
- (Bangladesh) Md Asanulla Rakib (Tongi Krira Chakra)
- (Bangladesh) Md Robiul Hossen (Jatrabari Jhotika Sangsod)
- (Bangladesh) Rizvi Hasan Rakib (Jatrabari Jhotika Sangsod)
- (Bangladesh) Md Shorif Uddin Sohan (Jahid Ahsan Sohel Krira Chakra)
- (Bangladesh) Mohammad Naim (Gouripur Sporting Club)
- (Bangladesh) Md Antor Mia (Kingstar Sporting Club)
- (Bangladesh) Md Mutasim Fuad (Purbachal Parishad)
- (Bangladesh) Md Rajib Hossain ( Dilkusha Sporting Club)

2 goals

- (Bangladesh) Proshanto Roy (Tongi Krira Chakra)
- (Bangladesh) MD Shahria Sazzad Siyam (Jatrabari Jhotika Sangsod)
- (Bangladesh) Akash Das (Jatrabari Jhotika Sangsod)
- (Bangladesh) Jihad Mondol (BG Press S&RC)
- (Bangladesh) Mohammad Shezan (BG Press S&RC)
- (Bangladesh) Shre Dip Chandra (Kingstar Sporting Club)
- (Bangladesh) Mohammad Mahim Molla (Kingstar Sporting Club)
- (Bangladesh) Shahriar Ahmed Riad (Kollol Shangha)
- (Bangladesh) Mohammad Akib Hossen (Kollol Shangha)
- (Bangladesh) Oporbu (Tongi Krira Chakra)
- (Bangladesh) Md Efthekar Ahmed Sany (Gouripur Sporting Club)
- (Bangladesh) Md Sourob Mollik (Chawkbazar Kings)
- (Bangladesh) Mosarof Hossain (Victoria Sporting Club)
- (Bangladesh) Md Jubayer Hasan Mahim (Victoria Sporting Club)
- (Bangladesh) Md Al-Kafi (Dilkusha Sporting Club)
- (Bangladesh) Tajdul Hasan Tashrif (Dilkusha Sporting Club)
- (Bangladesh) Abdul Awal Zilani ( Dilkusha Sporting Club)
- (Bangladesh) Md Sourov (Elias Ahmed Chowdhury Srity Sangsod)
- (Bangladesh) Azzam (Chawkbazar Kings)
- (Bangladesh) Mohammad Sahed Hossin (Jahid Ahsan Sohel Krira Chakra)
- (Bangladesh) Md Sohag Ahammed (Purbachal Parishad)
- (Bangladesh) Md Mahin Miah (Purbachal Parishad)
- (Bangladesh) Md Kolliur Rahman (Purbachal Parishad)

1 goal

- (Bangladesh) Kazi Sifat Ullah (Jatrabari Jhotika Sangsod)
- (Bangladesh) Emdadul Islam Abid (Jatrabari Jhotika Sangsod)
- (Bangladesh) Md Shahriar Nafis (Jatrabari Jhotika Sangsod)
- (Bangladesh) Md Jisan Ahmed (Khilgaon Football Academy)
- (Bangladesh) Thawhidul Alam (Kollol Shangha)
- (Bangladesh) Arman Aziz (Kollol Shangha)
- (Bangladesh) Md Shahriar Imon (Kollol Shangha)
- (Bangladesh) Salah Uddin (Kollol Shangha)
- (Bangladesh) Samiul Hasan Samil (Elias Ahmed Chowdhury Srity Sangsod)
- (Bangladesh) Hasan Sheikh (Chawkbazar Kings)
- (Bangladesh) Md Sazzad Hossain (Chawkbazar Kings)
- (Bangladesh) Raihan Mohammad (Jahid Ahsan Sohel Krira Chakra)
- (Bangladesh) Mohammad Naim Uddin Asif (Jahid Ahsan Sohel Krira Chakra)
- (Bangladesh) Md Sirol Aiman (Jahid Ahsan Sohel Krira Chakra)
- (Bangladesh) Sohag Mia (Victoria Sporting Club)
- (Bangladesh) Abir Chandra Dey (Victoria Sporting Club)
- (Bangladesh) Abdul Rabby (Victoria Sporting Club)
- (Bangladesh) Md Hasnat Mia (Victoria Sporting Club)
- (Bangladesh) Abdul Rabby (Victoria Sporting Club)
- (Bangladesh) Tanvirul Islam Joy (Victoria Sporting Club)
- (Bangladesh) Tanjim Israk Samin (Tongi Krira Chakra)
- (Bangladesh) Md Kawsar (Tongi Krira Chakra)
- (Bangladesh) Md Mostakim Islam (Tongi Krira Chakra)
- (Bangladesh) Tanim Israk Samin (Tongi Krira Chakra)
- (Bangladesh) Raju Sheikh (Tongi Krira Chakra)
- (Bangladesh) Md Hedayet Ullah (Gouripur Sporting Club)
- (Bangladesh) Md Mahim Miah Sojib (Gouripur Sporting Club)
- (Bangladesh) Faysal Ahmmad Akash (Gouripur Sporting Club)
- (Bangladesh) Arman (Gouripur Sporting Club)
- (Bangladesh) Md Zahid Hasan (Gouripur Sporting Club)
- (Bangladesh) Tahsan Kha (Purbachal Parishad)
- (Bangladesh) Md Rubel Mia (Purbachal Parishad)
- (Bangladesh) Md Tanzil Ahmed Shuvo (Kingstar Sporting Club)
- (Bangladesh) Shahid Ahmod Khan (Kingstar Sporting Club)
- (Bangladesh) Md Mohon (Kingstar Sporting Club)
- (Bangladesh) Md Piyas Dhali (Kingstar Sporting Club)
- (Bangladesh) Md Shrabon (Kingstar Sporting Club)
- (Bangladesh) Md Shahriar Hasan (Kingstar Sporting Club)
- (Bangladesh) Md Shafiq (Kingstar Sporting Club)
- (Bangladesh) Sajib Bakhtiar (Kingstar Sporting Club)
- (Bangladesh) Sajudul Islam Shopno (Khilgaon Football Academy)
- (Bangladesh) Sabbir Mohammad (Khilgaon Football Academy)
- (Bangladesh) Subas Soren (Khilgaon Football Academy)
- (Bangladesh) Rabbi Hasan Mehedi Khan (Khilgaon Football Academy)
- (Bangladesh) Md Arif (BKSP Football Club)
- (Bangladesh) Md Fahim Hasan (BKSP Football Club)
- (Bangladesh) Jayed Bin Maruf Himel (BKSP Football Club)
- (Bangladesh) Asikul Arifin (BKSP Football Club)
- (Bangladesh) Bayzid Bostami (BKSP Football Club)
- (Bangladesh) Md Rimon Khan (BKSP Football Club)
- (Bangladesh) Abiaz Fayek Khan (BKSP Football Club)
- (Bangladesh) Romio Langbang (BKSP Football Club)
- (Bangladesh) Md Asaduzzaman Munna (BG Press S&RC)
- (Bangladesh) Shahidul Islam ( Dilkusha Sporting Club)
- (Bangladesh) Md Rohan Islam Miraz (Dilkusha Sporting Club)
- (Bangladesh) Sajid Mahmud Rakib ( Dilkusha Sporting Club)
- (Bangladesh) Md Nihad ( Dilkusha Sporting Club)
- (Bangladesh) Junayed Islam Himu (BG Press S&RC)
- (Bangladesh) Ridoy Ahmed Forhad (BG Press S&RC)
- (Bangladesh) Md Mifta Hossain Antor (BG Press S&RC)

=== Own goals ===
† Bold Club indicates winner of the match.

Player	Club	Against	Result	Date	Ref
(Bangladesh) Md Mohim	BKSP Football Team	Purbachal Parishad	0–3	18 July 2026	
(Bangladesh) Md Monir Hosan	Khilgaon Football Academy	Chawkbazar Kings	0–4	19 July 2026	
(Bangladesh) Atik Hasan	Victoria Sporting Club	Chawkbazar Kings	1–1	28 July 2026	
(Bangladesh) Md Habibur Rahman Jim	Elias Ahmed Chowdhury Srity Songsod	Dilkusha Sporting Club	0–5	1 August 2026	
(Bangladesh) Md Monir Hossain	Chawkbazar Kings	BKSP Football Team	0–2	1 August 2026	
(Bangladesh) Md Rakib Mia	BKSP Football Team	Tongi Krira Chakra	1–1	9 August 2026	

=== Hat-tricks ===
† Bold Club indicates winner of the match.

Player	For	Against	Result	Date	Ref
(Bangladesh) Md Mohin Ahmmed	Purbachal Parishad	BG Press S&RC	4–1	7 July 2026	
(Bangladesh) Yeasin Arafat	BKSP Football Club	Victoria Sporting Club	5–3	12 July 2026	
(Bangladesh) Md Mohin Ahmmed	Purbachal Parishad	Gouripur Sporting Club	3–0	14 July 2026	
(Bangladesh) Md Monir Hosan	Chawkbazar Kings	Khilgaon Football Academy	4–0	19 July 2026	
(Bangladesh) Abu Hena Musiafa Kamal	Jabid Ahsan Sohel KC	Kingstar Sporting Club	5–2	21 July 2026	
(Bangladesh) Md Pavel Mia	Purbachal Parishad	Jabid Ahsan Sohel KC	4–1	1 August 2026	
(Bangladesh) Md Shibon Mia Iqbal	Gouripur Sporting Club	BG Press S&RC	3–0	2 August 2026	
(Bangladesh) Md Parvej Ahmed	Purbachal Parishad	Kollol Sangha	3–0	8 August 2026	
