= Saifur Rahman Moni =

Bangladeshi footballer

Saifur Rahman
Personal information
- Full name: Saifur Rahman Moni
- Date of birth: 2 February 1981 (age 45)
- Place of birth: Brahmanbaria, Bangladesh
- Height: 1.70 m (5 ft 7 in)
- Position: Striker

Team information
- Current team: Chittagong Abahani (head coach)

Youth career
- 1994–1996: BKSP

Senior career*
Years	Team	Apps	(Gls)
1995–1998	Fakirerpool YMC		
1999–2000	Farashganj SC		
2000	→ Chittagong Abahani (loan)		
2000–2002	Rahmatganj MFS		
2001–2002	→ Chittagong Abahani (loan)		
2002–2011	Muktijoddha Sangsad		

International career
1998	Bangladesh U19		
2000–2007	Bangladesh	20	(1)

Managerial career
- 2022: AFC Uttara
- 2022: Saif SC Jr.
- 2022–2023: Gopalganj SC
- 2023: Bangladesh U16
- 2024: Sheikh Jamal DC (caretaker)
- 2024–: Chittagong Abahani
Medal record
Representing Bangladesh
Men's football
SAFF Championship
Winner	2003 Bangladesh
- * Club domestic league appearances and goals

Saifur Rahman Moni (Bengali: সাইফুর রহমান মনি; born 2 February 1981) is a former Bangladeshi professional football coach and former player who currently serves as the head coach of Bangladesh Premier League club Chittagong Abahani.

== Early life ==
Moni was born in Ashuganj, a town in the Brahmanbaria District of Chittagong Division.

== Playing career ==
=== Club ===
Moni joined Farashganj SC in 1999, where he formed a lethal partnership with forward Rokonuzzaman Kanchan. He was joint top scorer in the 2000 National Football League with 3 goals for Chittagong Abahani. In 2001, Moni scored 6 goals as his club, Rahmatganj MFS, finished third in the Dhaka Premier Division League.

In 2002, Moni joined Muktijoddha Sangsad KC and later helped the club win the 2003 National Football League title with 6 goals including one in the final against Mohammedan SC. In the Dhaka Premier Division League, Moni regularly captained the Freedom Fighters who at the time were one of the strongest in the league, led by their striking duo of Moni and Kanchan.

With 7 goals, Moni was the highest goalscorer at the 2004 National Football League. During the tournament he also scored four goals in a 7–1 demolition of Panchagarh Brothers Union. In the same year, he scored in the Federation Cup final against Mohammedan SC in a 2–1 victory. Moni also won the 2004 Chittagong League with Chittagong Mohammedan SC. On 20 April 2004, Moni scored against Yemeni club Al Sha'ab Ibb at the 2004 AFC Cup, and although Muktijoddha lost the game 2–3, Moni became the first Bangladeshi player to score a goal in the AFC Cup.

On 17 May 2005, Moni underwent a successful knee operation in New Delhi, India, after he tore a ligament during the Federation Cup semifinal against Mohammedan on April 28 of that year. The injury led to him missing more than six weeks of the football season for Muktijoddha. Moni returned to the football and represented the Dhaka University football team, scoring a hat-trick against Jahangirnagar University in the Education zone play-offs of the 2006 National Football Championship.

On 17 March 2007, Moni scored the lone goal as Muktijoddha defeated Mohammedan to secure their first ever victory in the B.League. He remained with the club despite its financial woes prior to the 2009–10 Bangladesh League.

=== International career ===
Moni spent his youth career at Bangladesh Krira Shikkha Protishtan (BKSP) and was called up to the Bangladesh U16 in 1996, for the 1996 AFC U-16 Championship qualifiers. However, he did not play a single game during the qualifiers. In 1998, senior national team coach Abu Yusuf selected him for the Bangladesh national team, for two friendly games against Qatar and Qatar U23. Moni was also part of the Bangladesh team that won the 2003 SAFF Gold Cup on home soil. Moni played for the Bangladesh B team at the 2007 Merdeka Tournament, under coach Hasanuzzaman Khan Bablu. During the tournament he scored against Zimbabwe in a 1–2 defeat. He last appeared for the main national team on 28 October 2007, when Bangladesh suffered a 0–5 tharshing at the hands of Tajikistan.

== Coaching career ==
=== AFC Uttara ===
In February 2022, Moni got his first coaching job at AFC Uttara. The club had been given direct entry to the 2021–22 Bangladesh Championship League after meeting all the required criteria needed to participate in the second-tier, and Moni's inaugural match as coach, ended with a 3–0 victory over Kawran Bazar PS.

On 27 March 2022, Moni resigned from head coach duty and filed Match fixing allegations against the club's players and officials. He stated "I am very doubtful whether our matches number 7 and 8 in the championship league were played legally or not. So I don't want to involve myself in any work against the rules". The club's final two games under Moni, against Uttara FC (1–2) and Farashganj SC (3–1) were investigated by the Bangladesh Football Federation disciplinary committee and surprisingly even after all the allegations against them and match footage evidence they were declared innocent and given clearance to participate in the Bangladesh Premier League; as they had earned promotion the same season.

=== Saif SC Youth Team ===
In June 2022, Moni took charge of Saif SC Youth Team, who would take part in the Dhaka Second Division League, which is the fourth-tier of Bangladeshi football. Initially he was involved in player selection process alongside ex-national team midfielder Shahedul Alam Shahed. Moni's future at the club was uncertain even before the season began, as Saif Sporting Club pulled out of all sorts of footballing activities. Nonetheless, the club's Youth team were permitted to participate in the 2021–22 Dhaka Second Division League by the Bangladesh Football Federation and the Metropolitan Football League.

Moni's first game as the club's head coach ended in a 2–1 victory over Alamgir Somaj Kallayan, on 19 August 2022. Saif qualified for the Super League round as group champions, with 5 wins and 3 draws from 8 games. Integral to Moni's success were strikers Jubayer Ahmed and Noor Alam Siddik.In the Super League round, Moni's side were undefeated with 6 wins and 1 draw from 7 games, earning them promotion to the Dhaka Senior Division League as champions. The club were also the best defensive team in the league, conceding only 6 goals in 15 games. This was also Moni's first trophy as head coach of a club.

=== Gopalganj SC ===
In December 2022, following the conclusion of the Dhaka Second Division League, Moni secured an immediate return to the Bangladesh Championship League by joining Gopalganj Sporting Club. He guided the club to promotion to the Bangladesh Premier League by finishing third, as the runners-up BFF Elite Academy were ineligible for promotion. He departed the club after Gopalganj withdrew its name from the 2023–24 Bangladesh Premier League due to financial issues.

=== Bangladesh U16 ===
In August 2023, Moni was appointed as the head coach of Bangladesh national under-16 team for the 2023 SAFF U-16 Championship, held in Bhutan.

=== Sheikh Jamal Dhanmondi Club ===
On 15 January 2024, Moni was appointed caretaker cum assistant coach of Sheikh Jamal Dhanmondi Club, during the absence of head coach, Marjan Sekulovski. On 30 January 2024, Moni resigned from his post after Sekulovski officially departed the club. Moni stated that he was promised to serve as an assistant to a foreign coach after his stint as caretaker would end, however, the club failed to keep their word with the appointment of Zulfiker Mahmud Mintu as head coach.

== Career statistics ==
=== International ===
Bangladesh
Year	Apps	Goals
2000	4	0
2001	8	0
2003	3	1
2006	3	0
2007	2	0
Total	20	1

Scores and results list Bangladesh's goal tally first.

List of international goals scored by Saifur Rahman Moni
No.	Date	Venue	Opponent	Score	Result	Competition
1.	27 April 2001	Mirpur Stadium, Dhaka, Bangladesh	Bhutan	2–0	3–1	Friendly

== Managerial statistics ==
As of 1 July 2024

Team	From	To	P	W	D	L	GS	GA	%W
AFC Uttara	20 February 2022	27 March 2022	8	3	4	1	10	4	37.50
Saif SC Youth Team	15 June 2022	21 December 2022	15	11	4	0	23	6	73.33
Gopalganj SC	21 December 2022	October 2023	20	11	1	8	33	27	55.00
Bangladesh U16	August 2023	September 2023	4	2	0	2	3	4	50.00
Sheikh Jamal DC (caretaker)	15 January 2024	30 January 2024	3	2	0	1	6	4	66.67
Chittagong Abahani	1 November 2024	Present	0	0	0	0	0	0	—

== Honours ==
=== Player ===
Muktijoddha Sangsad KC

- National Football League: 2003
- Bangladesh Federation Cup: 2003
- Independence Cup: 2005
- Independence Day Gold Cup: 2005

Bangladesh

- SAFF Championship: 2003

Individual

- 2000 − National Football League top scorer
- 2003 − National Football League top scorer
- 2004 − National Football League top scorer

=== Manager ===
Saif SC Youth Team

- Dhaka Second Division League: 2021–22
