= Mirajul Islam =

Bangladeshi footballer (born 2006)

Personal information
- Full name: Mirajul Islam Miraj
- Date of birth: 1 October 2006 (age 20)
- Place of birth: Jhalokati, Bangladesh
- Position: Striker

Team information
- Current team: Dhaka Abahani
- Number: 23

Youth career
- 2017–2021: BKSP

Senior career*
Years	Team	Apps	(Gls)
2021	Kingstar SC	16	(10)
2021–2024	BFF Elite Academy	29	(29)
2022	→ Mohammedan SC (loan)	3	(0)
2023–2024	→ Brothers Union (loan)	8	(0)
2024–	Dhaka Abahani	25	(4)

International career^{‡}
2022	Bangladesh U17	6	(4)
2022–2024	Bangladesh U20	11	(9)
2025–	Bangladesh U23	5	(1)
2026	Bangladesh Olympic	3	(1)
2024–	Bangladesh	3	(0)
Medal record
Men's football
Representing Bangladesh
SAFF U-20 Championship
Runner-up	2022 India	Team
Winner	2024 Nepal	Team
- * Club domestic league appearances and goals as of 24 May 2026 ‡ National team caps and goals as of 8 June 2026

Mirajul Islam (Bengali: মিরাজুল ইসলাম; born 1 October 2006), commonly known as Miraj, is a Bangladeshi professional footballer who plays as a striker for Bangladesh Premier League club Abahani Limited Dhaka and the Bangladesh national team.

== Early life ==
Mirajul Islam Miraj was born on 1 October 2006, in Jhalokati District of the Barisal Division, the son of Henara Begum and Khalilur Rahman. His father, worked at a restaurant before retiring due to sickness. His parents were initially against the idea of him pursuing football, and often prevented Miraj from playing by tying him to beds in their house. Due to his family's persistence, Miraj had to hide his football boots at a friends house, who he would often visit and later stay with. In 2017, he survived the initial stage of Bangladesh Krira Shikkha Protishtan (BKSP) football trails held in Jhalokati, and was taken to Savar for the final selection stage. He impressed in the final selection round and was admitted to the Barishal branch of BKSP as a sixth grade student. He travelled to India with BKSP for the 2018 Subroto Cup, and struck 7 goals for his team. With the Barishal divisional team, he participated in the Bangabandhu U-17 Football Tournament in 2020, and was part of the team that defeated Chittagong Division 2–1 in the much anticipated final, with the presence of Prime Minister Sheikh Hasina. While playing regional tournaments with BKSP in Barishal, academy coach Anwar Hossain secured Miraj a deal with the 2017 Pioneer Football League champions Kingstar Sporting Club, in 2020.

== Club career ==
=== Kingstar Sporting Club ===
After the 2019–20 Dhaka Third Division League was postponed due to the COVID-19 outbreak and the season opening game against Chawkbazar United ended in their opponents forfeiting, Miraj officially made his debut for Kingstar and scored in a 2–0 victory over Alamgir Shomaj Kollayan KS, on 2 March 2021. Miraj scored his first domestic league goal while still being of only 14 years and 5 months. He scored a hat-trick against Asaduzzaman Football Academy in a 4–2 victory, on 5 March 2021. Miraj scored 6 goals from 7 games, as his team qualified for the Super League round as undefeated group winners.

In the Super League, Miraj scored his first goal in a 2–0 victory over Dipali Jubo Shangha, on 30 June 2021. He went on to score 3 more goals and a total of 4 goals in 9 Super League games, as his club earned promotion to the Dhaka Second Division League, as unbeaten runners-up. Miraj's goal against Narinda Junior Lions Club in the season ending game on 9 September 2021, was his last goal for the club. He finished the season with 10 goals from 16 games. While playing for the Kingstar he participated in the nationwide trials held by the Bangladesh Football Federation (BFF) for the newly launched BFF Elite Football Academy. He survived the trials and was selected for the main team that would eventually play second-tier football, the Bangladesh Championship League, the following year.

=== BFF Elite Academy ===
==== 2021–22 season: Breakthrough and Mohammedan SC ====
On 20 February 2022, Miraj entered professional football by scoring a brace, as BFF Elite Academy defeated NoFeL SC 2–1. This was the academies first league game and thus, Miraj became their first ever goalscorer, this attracted the attention of newly appointed national team head coach Javier Cabrera. He was selected for the preliminary Bangladesh U23 squad for the eventually postponed 2022 Asian Games, after only playing a single game in the second-tier. By the fifth matchday of the league season, the Elite Academy team had scored 6 goals, all of which scored by Miraj. Expressing his desire to play international football, Miraj stated in an interview "I don't know if I can play in the Asian Games. However, I have dreamed of playing in the national team since childhood."

On 10 March 2022, he was called up to the Bangladesh national team camp, to train with the team. Miraj scored a hat-trick against Uttara FC in a 5–2 victory, increasing his goal tally to 10 in 10 games. During the April mid-season transfer window, Miraj attracted interest from numerous clubs Bangladesh Premier League clubs and eventually joined Mohammedan SC on a loan deal with a transfer fee of Tk 10 lakh, thus, becoming the first Elite Academy player to join a top-tier club. 40 percent of the transfer fee was given to Miraj, and along with BFF's assistance he was able to pay for his mother, Henara Begum's treatment, as she was terminally ill with Cancer.

On 25 April 2022, Miraj made his Premier League debut against Sheikh Russel KC, coming on as a substitute in the 46th minute of the game. Mohammedan SC coach Sean Lane deployed him as a left-winger, until he was taken off by the 81st minute. He went on to make a couple of more appearances as a substitute, before Lane was replaced by Shafiqul Islam Manik at the dugout. Other than being an unused substitute against Bashundhara Kings on 2 July 2022, he was left out of the squad for the remainder of the season, ending his loan spell at the club with only 98 minutes of game time.

==== 2022–23 season: Top scorer ====
Miraj returned to the Elite Academy after his loan spell with Mohammedan ended. On 20 November 2022, Miraj scored both his and Elite Academy's first goal against a Premier League club in a 1–1 draw with Police FC during the 2022–23 Independence Cup. On 6 January 2023, he scored a hat-trick against Uttara FC in a 3–1 victory during the opening game of the 2022–23 Bangladesh Championship League. On 28 January 2023, he scored his second hat-trick of the season in a 3–0 victory over Little Friends Club, with his second goal being a stunning bicycle kick. By the end of the first phase of the league he scored 15 goals from 11 games.

On 13 February 2023, Miraj struck the lone goal in a 1–0 victory over Brothers Union, in the first match of the leagues second phase. On 11 April 2023, his goal against Swadhinata KS saw him set the record for the highest number of goals scored in a Bangladesh Championship League season. He scored 4 goals from 14 games in the second phase, and a total of 19 goals from 19 games to finish the season as the leagues highest goal scorer.

==== 2023–24 season: Brothers Union and Europe ====
In August 2023, it was reported that Miraj had signed a deal with an English football agent who would arrange him a trial in Europe. On 26 August 2023, he was included in the BFF Elite Academy auction, where the BFF stated that whichever club signs Miraj would have to release him for the trials, even in mid-season. Eventually, he was signed by newly promoted Premier League club Brothers Union on a loan deal worth Tk 6.5 lakh.

However, Miraj, along with the five other players Brothers Union purchased during the auction, missed the first phase of the 2023–24 Bangladesh Premier League as the club failed to finalize their payments with the BFF. The players finally received their clearance on 1 April 2024, and Miraj made his debut for the club against Rahmatganj MFS in the second phase of the league on 4 April 2024. He finished the season with eight appearances, with only one as part of the starting eleven. Eventually, his European trial also failed to materialize as he was absent from the pitch for the majority of the season.

=== Abahani Limited Dhaka ===
On 22 August 2024, Miraj registered for Bangladesh Premier League club Abahani Limited Dhaka.

== International career ==
=== Youth ===
In July 2022, Miraj was selected for the Bangladesh U20 team by coach Paul Smalley for the then upcoming 2022 SAFF U-20 Championship, in Bhubaneswar, India. As most players in the team were from top-tier Bangladeshi clubs, Miraj would have to start the tournament as a substitute against Sri Lanka U20, and scored from a curling effort on the 71st minute, to win his side the game. However, his goal was not enough to earn him a place in the starting XI against India U20, as he was an unused substitute in a 2–1 victory. On 29 July 2022, he started the third group game against Maldives U20 and scored a first-half hat-trick as his side won the game 4–1. Miraj's performances heaped praise from coach Paul Smalley, with the Englishman stating "He's a talented player, a player who needs a little bit of guidance. He works very hard and I'm very pleased for him. During the first half, he scored some wonderful goals and created some chances for other players. His application I thought was extremely good." Miraj's last appearance in the tournament was as a second-half substitute in the final, as Bangladesh would succumb to a 2–5 defeat.

In September 2022, Miraj was called up to the Bangladesh U17 for the 2022 SAFF U-17 Championship, held in Colombo, Sri Lanka. The team was coached by Rashed Ahmed Pappu, who was also the head coach of the BFF Elite Academy, and included only Elite Academy players. Although Bangladesh defeated hosts Sri Lanka U17 5–0, Miraj was not able to put his name on the scoresheet, he responded in the following group-stage game, with a hat-trick against Malidives U17 in a 5–1 win, on 7 September 2022. On 12 September 2022, Miraj scored against India U17, in the semi-final, he dribbled past two defenders before being fouled and earned a penalty, which he later converted. However, Bangladesh crashed out of the tournament with a 1–2 defeat. Nonetheless, Miraj's performances during the 2023 AFC U-17 Asian Cup qualifiers was disappointing, as hosts Bangladesh were unable to qualify for the main tournament after being thrashed 4–0 by Yeman U17.

In August 2024, Miraj participated in the 2024 SAFF U-20 Championship held in Lalitpur, Nepal. He scored the first goal in Bangladesh's 2–0 victory over Sri Lanka U20 in their opening game on 20 August 2024, which ensured the team's place in the tournament's semi-finals. In their final group-stage game, Miraj scored from a penalty, although Bangladesh lost 1–2 to hosts Nepal U20. In the final against hosts Nepal U20, held on 28 August, Miraj scored twice and provided an assist, with his first goal coming from a direct free-kick from about 20 yards in first-half stoppage time. Bangladesh eventually won the game 4–1, and Miraj was honored with the tournament's Top Scorer (with 4 goals from 4 games) and Most Valuable Player Awards.

=== Senior ===
On 29 August 2024, a day after winning the 2024 SAFF U-20 Championship, Miraj was included in the Bangladesh national team for two FIFA Friendly matches against Bhutan. He made his senior international debut by coming on as a 59th-minute substitute against Bhutan on 8 September 2024. The game ended in a 0–1 defeat.

== Personal life ==
Miraj is the youngest among three brothers and was brought up in his fathers rented house in Jhalokati municipality area. His eldest brother works in the Bangladesh Army while the middle one worked as an auto rickshaw driver. According to Miraj his brothers played an integral role in convincing his parents to let him pursue football as a career and his eventual admission into Bangladesh Krira Shikkha Protishtan (BKSP), where Miraj would also be able to complete his education.

== Career statistics ==
=== Club ===
As of 29 May 2024.

Appearances and goals by club, season and competition
Club	Season	League			Domestic Cup (Note: Appearance(s) in Bangladesh Federation Cup)		Other (Note: Appearance(s) in Bangladesh Independence Cup)		Continental		Total	
Club	Season	Division	Apps	Goals	Apps	Goals	Apps	Goals	Apps	Goals	Apps	Goals
Kingstar Sporting Club	2019–20	Dhaka Third Division League	16	10	—		—		—		16	10
Kingstar Sporting Club	Kingstar Sporting Club total		16	10	0	0	0	0	0	0	16	10
BFF Elite Academy	2021–22	Bangladesh Championship League	10	10	—		—		—		10	10
BFF Elite Academy	2022–23	Bangladesh Championship League	19	19	—		3	1	—		22	20
BFF Elite Academy	BFF Elite Academy total		29	29	0	0	3	1	0	0	32	30
Mohammedan SC (loan)	2021–22	Bangladesh Premier League	3	0	0	0	0	0	—		3	0
Brothers Union (loan)	2023–24	Bangladesh Premier League	8	0	0	0	0	0	—		8	0
Career total			56	39	0	0	3	1	0	0	59	40

=== International ===
As of 31 March 2026.

Appearances and goals by national team and year
National team	Year	Apps	Goals
Bangladesh	2024	1	0
Bangladesh	2026	2	0
Total		3	0

=== International goals ===
==== Youth ====
Scores and results list Bangladesh's goal tally first.

No.	Date	Venue	Opponent	Score	Result	Competition
1.	25 July 2022	Kalinga Stadium, Bhubaneswar, India	Sri Lanka	1–0	1–0	2022 SAFF U-20 Championship
2.	29 July 2022	Kalinga Stadium, Bhubaneswar, India	Maldives	1–0	4–1	2022 SAFF U-20 Championship
3.	29 July 2022	Kalinga Stadium, Bhubaneswar, India	Maldives	2–0	4–1	2022 SAFF U-20 Championship
4.	29 July 2022	Kalinga Stadium, Bhubaneswar, India	Maldives	3–1	4–1	2022 SAFF U-20 Championship
5.	7 September 2022	Colombo Racecourse, Colombo, Sri Lanka	Maldives	3–0	5–0	2022 SAFF U-17 Championship
6.	7 September 2022	Colombo Racecourse, Colombo, Sri Lanka	Maldives	4–0	5–0	2022 SAFF U-17 Championship
7.	7 September 2022	Colombo Racecourse, Colombo, Sri Lanka	Maldives	5–0	5–0	2022 SAFF U-17 Championship
8.	12 September 2022	Colombo Racecourse, Colombo, Sri Lanka	India	1–2	1–2	2022 SAFF U-17 Championship
9.	20 August 2024	Lalitpur, ANFA Complex, Nepal	Sri Lanka	1–0	2–0	2024 SAFF U-20 Championship
10.	22 August 2024	Lalitpur, ANFA Complex, Nepal	Nepal	1–2	1–2	2024 SAFF U-20 Championship
11.	28 August 2024	Lalitpur, ANFA Complex, Nepal	Nepal	1–0	4–1	2024 SAFF U-20 Championship
12.	28 August 2024	Lalitpur, ANFA Complex, Nepal	Nepal	2–0	4–1	2024 SAFF U-20 Championship
13.	23 September 2024	Haiphong, Lạch Tray Stadium, Vietnam	Guam	1–0	2–2	2025 AFC U-20 Asian Cup qualification
14.	22 August 2025	BFA Football Field, Manama, Bahrain	Bahrain	2–1	2–4	Friendly
15.	7 June 2026	National Football Stadium, Malé, Maldives	Maldives	1–1	1–1	Diamond Jubilee Football Tournament
Last updated 7 June 2026

== Honours ==
Bangladesh U-20

- SAFF U-20 Championship: 2024

Individual

- 2024 SAFF U-20 Championship Most Valuable Player
- 2024 SAFF U-20 Championship Top Scorer
- 2022 SAFF U-17 Championship Top Scorer
- 2022–23 Bangladesh Championship League Top Scorer
