= Sohel Al-Masum =

Bangladeshi footballer (1975–2015)

- Masum playing for Bangladesh during the 1998 FIFA World Cup qualifiers

Personal information
- Full name: Mohamed Sohel Al-Masum
- Date of birth: 5 August 1975
- Place of birth: Manikganj, Bangladesh
- Date of death: 13 October 2015 (aged 40)
- Place of death: Dhaka, Bangladesh
- Position: Left back

Youth career
- 1985–1993: BKSP

Senior career*
Years	Team	Apps	(Gls)
1993–1995	Fakirerpool		
1995–1998	Dhaka Abahani		
1999	Rahmatganj		
2000	Muktijoddha		

International career
1990	Bangladesh U16		
1995–1997	Bangladesh	13	(0)
Medal record
Representing Bangladesh
Men's football
South Asian Games
Silver medal – second place	1995
- * Club domestic league appearances and goals

Mohamed Sohel Al-Masum (Bengali: মোহাম্মদ সোহেল আল-মাসুম; 5 August 1975 – 13 October 2015) was a Bangladeshi footballer who mainly played as a left back. He played for a total of four clubs during his short career.

== Early career ==
Born in Manikganj, Masum spent his youth career with Bangladesh Krira Shikkha Protishtan (BKSP). He played for the BKSP U-14 team, which won the Dana Cup in Denmark in 1990 and also the Gothia Cup in Sweden.

== Club career ==
He started his club career with Youngmen's Fakirerpool Club in the 1993 season alongside other famous footballers such as Hassan Al-Mamun and Amin Rana. Masum played as the left-back in a Fakirerpool team which played some tremendous football over the next two seasons in a 5-3-2 formation, which was unique for a Bangladeshi club during that period. In his debut season, the Young Men's Club were promoted to the Dhaka Premier Division League. Masum was an integral part as the Young Men's finished eight during their first season in the top-flight. During the season, the team also managed to defeat eventual champions Dhaka Abahani.

During the 1999 season, Masum suffered a knee injury. Due to not receiving proper treatment the injury did not go away and eventually resulted in his retirement in 2000, at the age of only 25. He spent 1995 to 1998 with Abahani and then went on to play for Rahmatganj MFS and Muktijoddha Sangsad.

== International career ==
In 1990, following international tours with BKSP, Masum travelled to Bangkok to participate in the 1990 AFC U-16 Championship qualifiers, under coach Abdur Rahim. The Bangladesh U16 team defeated Malaysia U16 4–0 and tied 1–1 with Thailand U16. The team also managed to earn a 2–2 draw against giants South Korea U16. Although the team did not qualify for the main competition, they finished second in a group full of higher ranked countries.

Masum made his senior international debut for the Bangladesh national team in 1995, during the 4-nation Tiger Trophy tournament held in Myanmar. Coach Otto Pfister named an inexperienced squad, with six new players making their debuts during the tournament, and Masum was one of the standouts. He managed to outplace veteran left-back Masoud Rana, and played every single game during the country's first ever major tournament triumph. Masum also represented Bangladesh during the 1998 FIFA World Cup qualifiers.

== Career statistics ==
=== International ===
Appearances and goals by national team and year
National team	Year	Apps	Goals
Bangladesh
Bangladesh	1995	7	0
Bangladesh	1997	6	0
Total		13	0

== Personal life and death ==
On 13 October 2015, Masum died after suffering a Cardiac arrest. He was buried at his family graveyard in Singair, Manikganj.

== Honours ==
Fakirerpool Young Men's Club

- Dhaka First Division League: 1993

Abahani Limited Dhaka

- Dhaka Premier Division League: 1995
- Federation Cup: 1997

Muktijoddha Sangsad KC

- Dhaka Premier Division League: 2000

Bangladesh

- South Asian Games Silver: 1995
- 4-nation Tiger Trophy: 1995
