= Md Rabby Hossen Rahul =

Bangladeshi footballer (born 2006)

Rabby Hossen Rahul
Personal information
- Full name: Md Rabby Hossen Rahul
- Date of birth: 30 December 2006 (age 19)
- Place of birth: Benapole, Jessore District, Bangladesh
- Height: 1.65 m (5 ft 5 in)
- Positions: Left winger; right winger

Team information
- Current team: Bangladesh Police
- Number: 10

Youth career
- 2019–2022: Alhaj Nur Islam FA

Senior career*
Years	Team	Apps	(Gls)
2021	Bikrampur Kings	7	(1)
2021–2025	Bashundhara Kings	11	(1)
2022–2023	→ Wari Club (loan)	18	(4)
2023–2024	→ Brothers Union (loan)	18	(6)
2025–	Bangladesh Police	11	(2)

International career^{‡}
2023–2024	Bangladesh U20	6	(1)
2025–	Bangladesh U23	7	(0)
2024–	Bangladesh	2	(0)
Medal record
Men's football
Representing Bangladesh
SAFF U-20 Championship
Winner	2024 Nepal	Team
- * Club domestic league appearances and goals as of 1 June 2026 ‡ National team caps and goals as of 8 June 2026

Md Rabby Hossen Rahul (Bengali: মোহাম্মদ রাব্বি হোসেন রাহুল; born 30 December 2006) is a Bangladeshi professional footballer who plays as a left-winger for Bangladesh Football League club Bangladesh Police and the Bangladesh national team.

== Early life ==
Born on 30 December 2006 in Bhabarber, Benapole, Jessore, Rahul attended Benapole College.

== Early career ==
Rahul was trained at the Alhaj Nur Islam Football Academy by former national team footballer Sabbir Ahmed Palash while simultaneously working at a tea stall, earning 50 rupees a day to support his family. In 2020, he represented FC United Feni in the BFSF U-14 Academy Cup, notably scoring the equalizer from a free-kick during a 1–1 draw with FC Brahmanbaria. Rahul was adjudged the tournament's Best Player as his team won the title.

In 2021, he represented Bikrampur Kings during the Super League round of the 2019–20 Dhaka Third Division League, scoring a free-kick goal against Dipali Jubo Sangha during a 3–0 victory on 6 September 2021, as his team eventually secured promotion. His performances saw him being signed by Bashundhara Kings on a three-year contract. In 2022, Rahul was a member of the National School Football Championship runners-up Benapole Secondary School. He scored a brace in the tournament's opening game against Habiganj Ali Idris High School.

== Club career ==
In December 2022, Rahul contracted to Bashundhara Kings, was loaned to Wari Club in the 2022–23 Bangladesh Championship League. On 24 December 2022, he made his professional league debut during a goalless draw with Fakirerpool YMC in the league opener. On 22 January 2023, Rahul scored his first professional league goal coming in a 1–2 defeat to eventual champions Brothers Union. He ended the season with 4 goals from 18 games.

In October 2023, Rahul was loaned to the newly promoted Premier League club Brothers Union. On 27 October 2023, he made his debut for the club against Police FC in the 2023 Independence Cup. On 22 December 2023, he made his league debut during the opening game of the 2023–24 Bangladesh Premier League, scoring in a 2–5 defeat to his parent club, Bashundhara Kings. He finished the first half of the league season with 5 goals from 9 games.

== International career ==
In September 2023, Rahul represented the Bangladesh U19 team as a substitute in two games during the 2023 SAFF U-19 Championship.

In February 2024, Rahul was called up to the Bangladesh national team preliminary squad for home and away games against Palestine in the 2026 FIFA World Cup qualification – AFC second round.

On 5 September 2024, Rahul made his senior international debut for Bangladesh by coming on as a second-half substitute in a 1–0 victory over Bhutan.

== Career statistics ==
=== Club ===
As of 27 May 2025.

Appearances and goals by club, season and competition
Club	Season	League			Domestic Cup (Note: Appearance(s) in Bangladesh Federation Cup)		Other		Continental		Total	
Club	Season	Division	Apps	Goals	Apps	Goals	Apps	Goals	Apps	Goals	Apps	Goals
Bikrampur Kings	2019–20	Dhaka Third Division League	7	1	—		—		—		7	1
Bashundhara Kings	2021–22	Bangladesh Football League	0	0	0	0	0	0	0	0	0	0
Wari Club (loan)	2022–23	Bangladesh Championship League	18	4	0	0	0	0	—		18	4
Brothers Union (loan)	2023–24	Bangladesh Football League	18	6	2	0	2 (Note: Appearance(s) in Bangladesh Independence Cup)	0	—		22	6
Bashundhara Kings	2024–25	Bangladesh Football League	11	1	5	0	—		1 (Note: Appearance(s) in AFC Challenge League)	0	17	1
Bangladesh Police	2025–26	Bangladesh Football League	0	0	0	0	0	0	0	0	0	0
Career total			54	12	7	0	2	0	1	0	64	12

=== International ===
As of 8 September 2024.

Appearances and goals by national team and year
National team	Year	Apps	Goals
Bangladesh	2024	2	0
Total		2	0

== Honours ==
Bangladesh U-20

- SAFF U-20 Championship: 2024
