= Maksudul Amin Rana =

Bangladeshi footballer (born 1974)

Amin Rana
Personal information
- Full name: Maksudul Amin Rana
- Date of birth: 6 March 1974 (age 52)
- Place of birth: Jamalpur, Bangladesh
- Position: Striker

Youth career
- 1988–1992: BKSP

Senior career*
Years	Team	Apps	(Gls)
1992–1993	Team BJMC		
1993–1996	Fakirerpool YMC		
1997–1999	Dhaka Abahani		
2000–2001	Muktijoddha Sangsad		
2001–2002	Farashganj SC		
2002–2003	Badda Jagoroni		
2003–2005	Mohammedan SC		
2005–2007	Muktijoddha Sangsad		
2007–2008	Sheikh Russel KC		
2008–2010	Muktijoddha Sangsad		

International career
1997	Bangladesh U19		
1997–2001	Bangladesh	9	(1)
- * Club domestic league appearances and goals

Maksudul Amin Rana (Bengali: মাকসুদুল আমিন রানা; born 6 March 1974) is a retired Bangladeshi professional footballer who represented the Bangladesh national team from 1995 to 2001.

== Club career ==
A product of Bangladesh Krira Shikkha Protishtan (BKSP), Rana made his top-flight debut with Team BJMC in the Dhaka Premier Division League. In his debut season, BJMC were relegated, which saw Rana move to Fakirerpool Young Men's Club and remain in the Premier Division. His performances with Fakirerpool saw him being called up to the national team trials soon after. He won his first league title in 2000 with Muktijoddha Sangsad KC. In 2007, he joined Sheikh Russel KC for the inaugural season of the B.League. He retired in 2010 while playing for Muktijoddha due to long-standing injuries.

== International career ==
Rana represented Bangladesh during the qualifiers of the 1998 AFC Youth Championship. He was first called up to the senior team by Otto Pfister for the 1995 South Asian Games. He also represented the national team in the 1997 SAFF Gold Cup, 1998 FIFA World Cup qualifiers and the 2002 FIFA World Cup qualifiers.

== Career statistics ==
=== International ===
Appearances and goals by national team and year
National team	Year	Apps	Goals
Bangladesh
Bangladesh	1997	2	0
Bangladesh	1998	1	0
Bangladesh	2001	6	1
Bangladesh	Total	9	1

Scores and results list Bangladesh's goal tally first.

List of international goals scored by Maksudul Amin Rana
No.	Date	Venue	Opponent	Score	Result	Competition
1.	27 April 2001	Mirpur Stadium, Dhaka, Bangladesh	Bhutan	1–0	3–1	Friendly

== Honours ==
Abahani Limited Dhaka

- Federation Cup: 1997, 1999

Muktijoddha Sangsad KC

- Dhaka Premier Division League: 2000
- Federation Cup: 2001, 2005
- Independence Day Gold Cup: 2005
