= Kingstar Sporting Club =

Kingstar Sporting Club কিংস্টার স্পোর্টিং ক্লাব
- Full name: Kingstar Sporting Club
- Founded: 2015; 11 years ago
- Ground: BSSS Mostafa Kamal Stadium
- Capacity: 25,000
- President: Md Kamrul Hasan Pintu
- Head coach: Mohammad Ashraful Haque
- League: Dhaka Second Division League
- 2026–27: TBD
Home colours	Away colours

Kingstar Sporting Club (Bengali: কিংস্টার স্পোর্টিং ক্লাব), also referred as Kingstar SC, is a Bangladeshi football club based in Dhaka. The club currently competes in the Dhaka Second Division League, the overall fourth-tier of Bangladeshi Football.

== History ==
=== Foundation ===
The club was founded in 2015 as ARK Sporting Club. In 2016, they were quarter-finalists in the Pioneer Football League. On 5 May 2017, the club announced through their official Facebook page that they would be participating in the 2017 Pioneer Football League as Kingstar Sporting Club.

=== Early years ===
The same season the club were unbeaten Pioneer Football League champions, winning all four games in the Super League round and scoring 27 goals in process, they eventually ended their campaign by defeating Mirpur Sports & Physical Culture Center 2–1 in the final. The title triumph earned them promotion to the Dhaka Third Division Football League. The club's midfielder Maraz Hossain scored 52 goals out of the club's 94 goals scored that season.

=== Dhaka Football League ===
The club were set to start their semi-professional league journey, with the Third Division League opener against Chawkbazar United. However, their opponents forfeited after players from Kingstar entered the field. Nonetheless, the club won their group and eventually earned promotion to the Dhaka Second Division Football League as unbeaten runners-up in the Super League. The club's striker Mirajul Islam was their main threat, scoring 10 goals from 16 games. On 12 September 2022, the club defeated Jatrabari Jhotika Sangshad 3–0, in a Second Division League fixture. This meant the club were now unbeaten for 38 games in Dhaka domestic football. On 20 September, their unbeaten run came to an end after Purbachal Parishad defeated them 0–2. This was also the club's first defeat since entering the semi-professional football league. The club managed to reach the Super League round and eventually missed out on promotion after finishing in sixth place.

On 22 January 2023, former national footballer and the club's assistant coach Hanif Dablu died.

== Personnel ==
=== Board of directors ===
As of May 2023

Position	Name
President	(Bangladesh) Md Kamrul Hasan Pintu
Senior vice president	(Bangladesh) Hanif Rashid W
Vice president	(Bangladesh) Noor Alam Siddiqui
Chairman	(Bangladesh) Santosh Sharma
General secretary	(Bangladesh) Tarik Bin Firoj
General secretary	(Bangladesh) Ashraful Haque
General secretary	(Bangladesh) Dewan Jahangir Hossain
General secretary	(Bangladesh) Harun Khan
Media officer	(Bangladesh) Hasan Shiplu
Treasurer	(Bangladesh) Shariful Hasan Titu
Organizing secretary	(Bangladesh) Amanullah Aman
Communication secretary	(Bangladesh) Tipu Sultan

== Head coaches record ==
As of 5 July 2026

Coach	From	To	P	W	D	L	GS	GA	%W
(Bangladesh) Ashraful Haque	January 2019	September 2021	17	10	7	0	30	10	58.82
(Bangladesh) Anwar Hossain	August 2021	2022	16	6	5	5	18	18	37.50
(Bangladesh) Ashraful Haque	30 March 2026	Present	1	0	1	0	1	1	0.00

P – Total of played matches W – Won matches D – Drawn matches L – Lost matches GS – Goals scored GA – Goals against
%W – Percentage of matches won

== Competitive record ==
Season	Division	League								Federation Cup	Independence Cup	Top league scorer(s)	
Season	Division	P	W	D	L	GF	GA	Pts	Position	Federation Cup	Independence Cup	Player	Goals
2019–20	Third Division	17	10	7	0	30	10	37	2nd	—	—	(Bangladesh) Mirajul Islam	10
2021–22	Second Division	16	6	5	5	18	18	23	6th	—	—	(Bangladesh) Iftsham Rahman Zidan	12

Champions	Runners-up	Third place	Promoted	Relegated
