= Saif Sporting Club Youth Team =

Saif SC Youth Team
- Full name: Saif sporting club limited Youth Team
- Founded: August 2016; 9 years ago
- Ground: BSSS Mostafa Kamal Stadium
- Capacity: 25,000
- Owner: Saif Powertec Limited
- Managing Director: (Bangladesh) Sheikh Maruf Hasan
- Head coach: (Bangladesh) Saifur Rahman Moni
- Website: http://saifsportingclubltd.com/
Home colours	Away colours

Saif Sporting Club Youth Team is the under-19 team of Bangladeshi football club Saif Sporting Club. It currently competes in the Dhaka Second Division Football League, the fourth-tier of Bangladeshi football. The team plays all their league games at the BSSS Mostafa Kamal Stadium, in Dhaka.

They made their domestic league debut by taking part in the 2018 Dhaka Third Division League. The team will also participate in the BFF U-18 Football Tournament.

== History ==
in 2016, Saif Sporting Club tied up with BKSP and selected twenty players for two years training. On August 3, 2017, the club announced the name of Spanish coach Andrés Vargas Fuentes as their U18 head coach. On August 24, 2017, the club announced the name of local renowned coach Kamal Babu as their U16 head coach.

On 18 October 2017, Vargas and Co. clinched the title of One Day Football Festival Tournament in memory of Sheikh Russel, beating Kashaituli Samaj Kalyan Parishad in a penalty shoot-out by 4–3 goals.

=== Domestic league era ===
In 2018, the U16 team qualified for the Dhaka Second Division League after winning their Dhaka Third Division League play-off game against Jatrabari Jhatika Sangsad.

Saif Sporting Club U18 took part in the 2019 BFF U-18 Football Tournament, after topping their group, Saif faced Sheikh Jamal DC U-18 in the quarter-final, winning 2–1. In the semi-final the U18 team trashed Dhaka Abahani U-18 5–0. However, in the finals NoFeL SC U-18 caused a major upset, defeating Saif by a solitary goal. The teams joint top goal scorers during the tournament were Sakib Bepari and Sujon Mahat, with three goals.

In June 2022, Saif Sporting Club held a talent hunt in order to select players for the 2021–22 Dhaka Second Division Football League, about 150 footballers participated, and a total of 37 players including 4 goalkeepers were initially selected as the preliminary squad, but was later shorten down to 30 players due to league laws. The players who were not selected were sent to the Saif Sporting Club Academy, as the club would also be participating in the BFF U-18 Football Tournament. Former Bangladesh national football team duo Saifur Rahman Moni and Shahedul Alam Shahed were appointed as head coach and senior team manager respectively.

Although Saif Sporting Club decided not to take part in the 2022-23 domestic football season, Saif SC Youth Team was permitted by the Bangladesh Football Federation and the Metropolitan Football League to take part in the Dhaka Second Division Football League. On 19 August 2022, Saif Youth Team opened the league season by defeating Alamgir Somaj Kollayan 2–1, captain Noor Alam Siddik scored the opener, while Mahmadul added the second goal.

== Personnel ==
=== Current technical staff ===
As of June 2022.

Position	Name
Team manager	(Bangladesh) Shahedul Alam Shahed
Head coach	(Bangladesh) Saifur Rahman Moni
Goalkeeping coach	(Bangladesh) Arifur Rahman Pannu
Technical director	(Bangladesh) Md. Maruf Hasan

== Competitive record ==
As of 19 August 2022.

Season	Division	League								BFF U-18 Football Tournament	Other	Top league scorer(s)	
Season	Division	P	W	D	L	GF	GA	Pts	Position	BFF U-18 Football Tournament	Other	Player	Goals
2018	Dhaka Third Division League	?	?	?	?	?	?	?	4th (Promoted through play-off)	Group Stage	—	—	—
2019	Second Division Not Held									Runners-up	—	(Bangladesh) Sakib Bepari (Bangladesh) Sujon Mahat	3
2021–22	Dhaka Second Division League	1	1	0	0	2	1	3	TBD	TBD	—	—	—
