= Bangladesh Krira Shikkha Protishtan =

Sports institution

Coordinates: 23°59′26.58″N 90°15′6.51″E

- বাংলাদেশ ক্রীড়া শিক্ষা প্রতিষ্ঠান
- Crest of Bangladesh Krira Shikkha Protishtan
- Abbreviation: BKSP
- Formation: 1986; 40 years ago
- Headquarters: Zirani Bazar, Savar, Dhaka, Bangladesh
- Region served: Bangladesh
- Official language: Bengali
- Director-General: Brigadier General Muhammad Munirul Islam
- Affiliations: Ministry of Youth and Sports
- Website: bksp.gov.bd

Bangladesh Krira Shikkha Protishtan (BKSP) (Bengali: বাংলাদেশ ক্রীড়া শিক্ষা প্রতিষ্ঠান, Bangladesh Institute of Sports Education) is the national sports institute of Bangladesh. It is residential and is located at Savar, about 28 kilometres (17 mi) north-west of the capital, Dhaka, and about 8 kilometres (5.0 mi) north of the National Martyrs' Memorial. It is a government-funded autonomous institution.

== History and management ==
Bangladesh Krira Shikkha Protishtan was established in 1986 with the objective of developing sports in Bangladesh. BKSP is run by a Board of Governors, which is headed by the national Minister of Youth and Sports. Brigadier General Muhammad Munirul Islam has been the Director General of BKSP since August 2024.

== Education ==
Students at BKSP receive a general education as well as specialized sports training. The education extends from secondary school level to university degree level. The college is fully residential. Students are accommodated in four hostels for boys and one for girls. They receive food, medical treatment and sports materials. Tuition fees are determined on the basis of family income. Most of the teachers also live at the campus.

The sports taught at BKSP are cricket, football, table tennis, archery, athletics, karate, boxing, judo, basketball, swimming, hockey, volleyball, gymnastics, shooting, tennis, taekwondo and wushu. Students must pass tests to be accepted into BKSP.

== Public school ==
BKSP established a public school in 1987 at Zirani Bazar, Savar, Dhaka to provide education to its staff and the local community. The school is named BKSP Public School & College. The college section started in 2023, offering education from pre-school to 12th grade. The school has an English version from nursery to 3rd grade.

The campus includes a six-story academic building on the east side and a three-story building under construction on the north side, which will serve both nursery and college sections. Additionally, there is a ground-floor building on the south and west sides, housing the teachers' room and administrative offices.

The school also features a large library, a computer lab, and a prayer hall for Muslim students. There is a medium-large playground in the center of the campus. BKSP Public School & College organizes various cultural events such as Peetha Utsav, Book Utsav, and cultural performance, yearly sports event, among others. It is a popular school among its neighboring schools.

As usual the Director General of BKSP is the chairman of this public school. The principal is retired Bangladesh Army Major Muhammad Kamrul Hassan. He has been serving as principal since 2022.

== Cricket team ==
The institute's cricket team has played in various competitions in Bangladesh since the academy's founding. It began playing List A cricket in the 2018–19 Dhaka Premier Division Cricket League and T20 cricket in the 2018–19 Dhaka Premier Division Twenty20 Cricket League. Many of its players have gone on to represent Bangladesh.

== Football team ==
The BKSP football team has taken part in the lower divisions of Bangladeshi football since the mid-2000s. The football team has also won international trophies such as Gothia Cup from Sweden and Subroto Cup from India. They took part in the 2021–22 Dhaka Second Division Football League. In 2016, the institution began operating a women's football team.

== Notable alumni ==
- Asif Hossain Khan, first Bangladeshi shooter to win a gold at the Commonwealth Games
- Shakib Al Hasan, cricketer, Bangladesh cricket team
- Raqibul Hasan, cricketer, Bangladesh cricket team
- Mushfiqur Rahim, cricketer, Bangladesh cricket team
- Abdur Razzak, cricketer, Bangladesh cricket team
- Soumya Sarkar, cricketer, Bangladesh cricket team
- Anamul Haque, cricketer, Bangladesh cricket team
- Mominul Haque, cricketer, Bangladesh cricket team
- Nasir Hossain, cricketer, Bangladesh cricket team
- Naeem Islam, cricketer, Bangladesh cricket team
- Suhrawadi Shuvo, cricketer, Bangladesh cricket team
- Shafiul Islam, cricketer, Bangladesh cricket team
- Litton Das, cricketer, Bangladesh cricket team
- Mamunul Islam, footballer, Bangladesh football team
- Mohamed Masoud Rana, footballer, Bangladesh football team
- Sohel Al-Masum, footballer, Bangladesh football team
- Hassan Al-Mamun, footballer, Bangladesh football team
- Firoj Mahmud Titu, footballer, Bangladesh football team
- Maksudul Amin Rana, footballer, Bangladesh football team
- Zahid Hasan Ameli, footballer, Bangladesh football team
- Hemanta Vincent Biswas, footballer, Bangladesh football team
- Mohammad Jewel, footballer, Bangladesh football team
- Maraz Hossain Opi, footballer, Bangladesh football team
- Foysal Ahmed Fahim, footballer, Bangladesh football team

== See also ==
- BKSP football team
- BKSP women's football team
- BKSP cricket grounds
- Stadiums in Bangladesh
- BKSP cricket team
