= Tenuka Ranaweera =

Sri Lankan footballer (born 2005)

Personal information
- Date of birth: 1 August 2005 (age 21)
- Place of birth: Mombasa, Kenya
- Position: Midfielder

Team information
- Current team: Nairobi United

Youth career
- Bandari

Senior career*
Years	Team	Apps	(Gls)
2023–	Nairobi United		

International career
2024–	Sri Lanka	1	(0)
- * Club domestic league appearances and goals

Tenuka Ranaweera (Sinhala: තේනුක රණවීර; born 1 August 2005) is a footballer who plays as a midfielder for Nairobi United. Born in Kenya, he is a Sri Lanka international.

== Life and career ==
Ranaweera was born on 1 August 2005 in Mombasa, Kenya. He attended Shree Swaminarayan Academy in Kenya. After that, he attended Kitengela International School in Kenya. He mainly operates as a midfielder. He specifically operates as an attacking midfielder. He is right-footed. He has received comparisons to France international Matteo Guendouzi. He has been described as a "phenomenal young player with good mentality for fighting". As a youth player, he joined the youth academy of Bandari He started his career with Nairobi United.

Ranaweera is a Sri Lanka youth international. He played for the Sri Lanka national under-20 football team at the 2024 SAFF U-20 Championship. He was regarded as one of the team's most prominent players during the tournament. He is a Sri Lanka international. He played for the Sri Lanka national football team for 2027 AFC Asian Cup qualification. On 10 September 2024, he debuted for the Sri Lanka national football team during a 2–2 draw with the Cambodia national football team.
