= Dhaka Fourth Division Football League =

- Founded: 1966; 60 years ago
- Folded: 1969; 57 years ago
- Country: Bangladesh
- Number of clubs: 12
- Level on pyramid: 4
- Promotion to: Dhaka Third Division League
- Relegation to: None
- Last champions: IWTA RC (1969)
- Most championships: IWTA RC; EPWAPDA SC; Purbachal Parishad; EPRTC SC (1 title each)

Dhaka Fourth Division Football League (Bengali: ঢাকা চতুর্থ বিভাগ ফুটবল লীগ) was the fourth-tier of the Dhaka Football League, which was the top football league system in East Pakistan (and later Bangladesh).

It was the lowest division of football in Dhaka. In contrast to the other divisions of the Dhaka Football League, which were administered directly by the East Pakistan Sports Federation (EPSF), the Fourth Division was administered by the Dhaka District Sports Association (DDSA) in cooperation with its founder, the EPSF. The league was only active for three seasons from 1966 to 1969 and was not played following the Independence of Bangladesh.

== History ==
The Dhaka Fourth Division Football League was established in 1966 by the East Pakistan Sports Federation (EPSF). The league was run under the auspices of the Dhaka District Sports Association (DDSA). The inaugural match was played on 15 November 1966 at the Outer Stadium Ground 2 in Dhaka between Mirpur Sporting Association and Mogbazar Students Club, with the former winning 6–0.

Members during the three seasons in operation were:

- 1966: Mirpur SA, Mogbazar Students Club, Azad SC B, Azad Muslim Club, Purbachal Parishad, Siddique Bazar SC, EPWAPDA SC, Dhaka Municipality, Purabi Boys Club, Zinzira R&SC, Alam Textiles, Comrade Union
- 1967: Alam Textiles, Faridabad SC, Siddique Bazar SC, Diamond Club, Progati Sangha, Brothers SC, Chalachal Sangsad, Carvan SC, Golapbagh Sangsad, EPRTC SC, Mahmud SC, AGEP Institute, Begum Bazar SC, Lalbagh SC, Sebak Samity, Paltan SC, Joginapur SC, Paltan Jubo Sangha, Students SC, Mirpur SA, Mogbazar Students Club, Naz SC, Azad Muslim Club, New National SC, Udity Club (withdrew)
- 1969: IWTARC RC, Naz SC, Moon Light Boys Club, Student SC, Golapbagh Sangsad, Dacca Akota Sangha, Lalbagh SC, Shaheen Sporting, Azad Muslim Club, New National SC, Rupali Silpi Sangha, Mogbazar Students Club, Mader Tek Meetali Sangha (withdrew), Khilgaon SC (withdrew)

== Format ==
The Fourth Division allowed clubs to enter through registration and had no relegation system as it was the lowest-tier in the football league system. According to normal procedure the top-two finishing team would earn promotion to the Third Division, while the bottom-two teams from the Third Division would be demoted to the league.

In the inaugural 1966 edition, twelve clubs were divided into two groups. The winners of each group earned promotion to the Third Division and then competed in a championship play-off final. In the 1967 edition, 25 teams were initially divided into three groups, but Udity Club later withdrew. The top teams from each group advanced to a round-robin league, where the top two teams secured promotion to the Third Division and faced each other in a championship play-off final. The 1969 edition featured 12 participating teams, following the withdrawals of Khilgaon SC and Mader Tek Meetali Sangha. Group A comprised 7 teams, while Group B had 5. The winners of each group faced off in a championship play-off match.

Regulations beginning from the 1967 season were as follows:

- Match duration would be 60 minutes with each half being of 30 minutes
- A minimum of 5 players from each team would have to wear boots
- Players who have previously played in the First Division, Second Division or Third Division were barred from participating

== Season overview ==
Ed.	Year	Champion	Final	Runner-up	Final venue	Season duration	Ref
1	1966	EPWAPDA SC & Purbachal Parishad	1–1	None	Outer Stadium Ground 3	15 November 1966 – 4 January 1967	
2	1967	EPRTC SC	W.O.	Alam Textiles	DDSA Ground	10 November 1967 – 31 January 1968	
3	1969	IWTA RC	6–0	Shaheen SC	Outer Stadium Ground 4	12 April 1969 – 21 May 1969	

== See also ==
- Bangladeshi football league system
