= Purbachal Parishad =

Association football club in Bangladesh

Purbachal Parishad পূর্বাচল পরিষদ
- Full name: Purbachal Parishad
- Short name: PP
- Founded: 1952; 74 years ago
- Head Coach: Arman Hossain
- League: Dhaka Second Division League
- 2026–27 season: TBD
Home colours	Away colours

Purbachal Parishad (Bengali: পূর্বাচল পরিষদ) is a Bangladeshi football club based in the Purbachal, Dhaka. It currently competes in the Dhaka Second Division League, the fourth-tier of Bangladeshi football.

== History ==
Founded in Purbachal, Dhaka, in 1952, Purbachal began participating in the Dhaka Third Division League from 1967, after jointly winning the inaugural Fourth Division League title alongside WAPDA Sports Club.

The club earned promotion to the Dhaka Second Division League by finishing runners-up in the league during the 2000 season and eventually became Second Division champions in 2003–04 and began participating in the Dhaka Senior Division League, when it was made the second-tier following the introduction of the Bangladesh Premier League.

In 2010, Purbachal were relegated from the Senior Division League. Since then, the club participates in the Dhaka Second Division League, now the second division football league in Dhaka and overall the country's fourth-tier.

== Team records ==
=== Coaching records ===
As of 4 July 2026

Head Coach	From	To	P	W	D	L	GS	GA	%W
(Bangladesh) Arman Hossain	1 January 2026	Present	1	0	1	0	1	1	0.00

== Honours ==
- Dhaka Second Division League
  - Champions (1): 2003–04
  - Runners-up (1): 2025–26
- Dhaka Third Division League
  - Runners-up (1): 2000
- Dhaka Fourth Division League
  - Champions (1): 1966
