= Independence Day Gold Cup =

Tournament details
- Host country: Bangladesh
- City: Dhaka
- Dates: 18 March - 16 April 2005
- Teams: 8
- Venue: 1 (in 1 host city)

Final positions
- Champions: Muktijoddha Sangsad KC (1st title)
- Runners-up: Brothers Union

Tournament statistics
- Matches played: 15
- Goals scored: 48 (3.2 per match)

The Independence Day Gold Cup was the first and only edition of the tournament which was organised by the Bangladesh Football Federation (BFF) to mark its permanent possession of the Bangabandhu National Stadium. It also served as a tribute to the martyrs of the Bangladesh Liberation War. The tournament was sponsored by the Ministry of Liberation War Affairs and Muktijoddha Sangsad. A total of 8 teams competed in the tournament, which took place from 18 March to 16 April 2005.

== Venues ==
Dhaka
Bangabandhu National Stadium
Capacity: 36,000
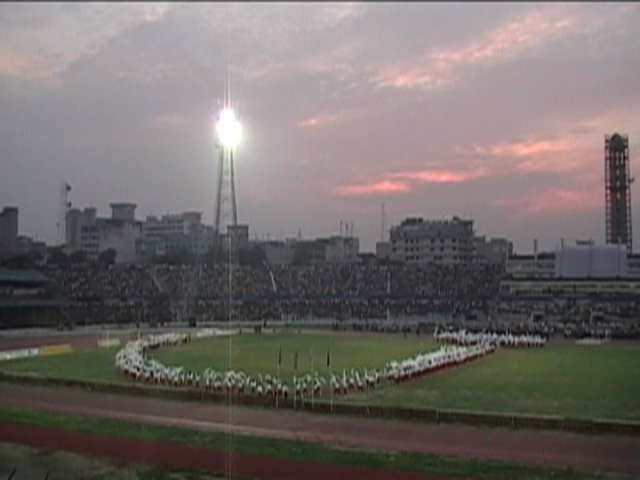

== Group stage ==
The eight participants were divided into two groups. The top two teams for each group qualified for the semifinals.

=== Group A ===
Team	Pld	W	D	L	GF	GA	GD	Pts	Qualification
Muktijoddha Sangsad KC	3	3	0	0	8	3	+5	9	Advance to Knockout stage
Mohammedan SC	3	2	0	1	9	6	+3	6	Advance to Knockout stage
Sheikh Russel KC	3	1	0	2	5	7	−2	3	
Arambagh KS	3	0	0	3	1	7	−6	0	

Source: RSSSF
18 March 2005

Mohammedan SC	4–0	Arambagh KS
	Report

Bangabandhu National Stadium, Dhaka
18 March 2005

Muktijoddha Sangsad KC	3–1	Sheikh Russel KC
	Report

Bangabandhu National Stadium, Dhaka

20 March 2005

Muktijoddha Sangsad KC	2–1	Arambagh KS
Kanchan 5'; Charles Ghansha (90+?)	Report	Murad Ahmed Milon 9'

Bangabandhu National Stadium, Dhaka
20 March 2005

Mohammedan SC	4–3	Sheikh Russel KC
Nakib 5', 80'; Alfaz 1T (2-1); Munna 60'	Report	Ighir Mohammad 7'; Rachid 50', 58'

Bangabandhu National Stadium, Dhaka

22 March 2005

Muktijoddha Sangsad KC	3–1	Mohammedan SC
Biplob 11' (o.g.); Kanchan 15'; Paul Nwachukwu 34'	Report	Kim Zeu 74'

Bangabandhu National Stadium, Dhaka
22 March 2005

Sheikh Russel KC	1–0	Arambagh KS
Maksudul Alam Bulbul 64'	Report

Bangabandhu National Stadium, Dhaka

=== Group B ===
Team	Pld	W	D	L	GF	GA	GD	Pts	Qualification
Brothers Union	3	2	1	0	9	2	+7	7	Advance to Knockout stage
Abahani Limited Dhaka	3	2	0	1	4	4	0	6	Advance to Knockout stage
Farashganj SC	3	1	1	1	5	5	0	4	
Fakirerpool YMC	3	0	0	3	2	9	−7	0	

Source: RSSSF
19 March 2005

Abahani Limited Dhaka	3–0	Fakirerpool YMC
Ujjal 66', 90'; Fardhad 30'	Report

Bangabandhu National Stadium, Dhaka
19 March 2005

Brothers Union	2–2	Farashganj SC
Victor Edwards 18'; Abul 26'	Report	Rony Islam 57', 73'

Bangabandhu National Stadium, Dhaka

21 March 2005

Brothers Union	4–0	Abahani Limited Dhaka
	Report

Bangabandhu National Stadium, Dhaka
21 March 2005

Farashganj SC	3–2	Fakirerpool YMC
	Report

Bangabandhu National Stadium, Dhaka

23 March 2005

Brothers Union	3–0	Fakirerpool YMC
Victor Edwards 11'; Adil Okero (?), 74'	Report

Bangabandhu National Stadium, Dhaka
23 March 2005

Abahani Limited Dhaka	1–0	Farashganj SC
Zahid 44'	Report

Bangabandhu National Stadium, Dhaka

== Knockout stage ==
=== Semi-final ===
25 March 2005

Muktijoddha Sangsad KC	2–0	Abahani Limited Dhaka
Charles Ghansha 75'; Moni 82'	Report

Bangabandhu National Stadium, Dhaka

27 March 2005

Brothers Union	1–0	Mohammedan SC
Abul 63'	Report

Bangabandhu National Stadium, Dhaka

=== Final ===
30 March 2005

Muktijoddha Sangsad KC	abd. (1–0 in 12')	Brothers Union
	Report	Victor Edwards 10'

Bangabandhu National Stadium, Dhaka
- Note: Originally, the final between Brothers Union and Muktijoddha Sangsad KC on April 30 had to be abandoned after just 12 minutes due to heavy showers with Brothers leading 1–0. The final was rescheduled to take place on 16 April 2005.

==== Final Replay ====
16 April 2005

Muktijoddha Sangsad KC	2–0	Brothers Union
Paul Nwakwuchu 45'; Saiful Islam 60'	Report

Bangabandhu National Stadium, Dhaka
Attendance: 10,000
