= Bikrampur Kings =

Association football club based in Munshigonj, Bangladesh

Bikrampur Kings বিক্রমপুর কিংস
- Founded: 2019; 7 years ago
- Owner(s): Farhad Hossain; Samrat Mohim Talukdar
- President: Farhad Hossain
- Head Coach: MD Shahiduzzaman Shamim
- League: Dhaka Second Division Football League
Home colours	Away colours

Bikrampur Kings (Bengali: বিক্রমপুর কিংস) is a Bangladeshi football club based in Bikrampur, present day Munshiganj. It currently competes in the Dhaka Second Division Football League, the fourth tier of Bangladeshi football.

== History ==
In 2019, businessmen Samrat Mohim Talukdar and Farhad Hossain established Bikrampur Kings. The name derived from Munshiganj District, historically known as Bikrampur, which is an old region in Bengal and was a part of the Bhawal Estate. Bashundhara owned outfit Bashundhara Kings, also had a major part in the clubs formation.

Amidst the COVID-19 pandemic in Bangladesh, Bikrampur Kings took part in the 2019–20 Dhaka Third Division Football League. The club also recruited ex-Bangladesh national team player Md Shamim as their head coach.

On 5 March 2021, Bikrampur Kings played their first divisional league game, in a goalless draw against Lalbagh SC at Kamlapur. In their first season, the club managed to qualify for the Super League round by finishing fifth in the first round. During the Super League Bikrampur earned a memorable win over Narinda JLC, and eventually confirmed promotion to the Second Division by clinching the fifth and final promotion spot.

Before the 2021–22 Dhaka Second Division Football League went underway, the club held a talent hunt at the BSSS Mostafa Kamal Stadium, while replacing head coach Md Shamim with another former national team star and Munshiganj born striker Mizanur Rahman Dawn. On 10 August 2022, Bikrampur started their league season with a 1–2 loss against BKSP.

== Personnel ==
=== Current technical staff ===
As of October 2023

Position	Name
Head coach	(Bangladesh) MD Shahiduzzaman Shamim
Manager	(Bangladesh) Ataur Rahman Ata

=== Board of directors ===
As of August 2022

Position	Name
President	(Bangladesh) Farhad Hossain
General Secretary	(Bangladesh) Samrat Mohim Talukdar
