= 2021–22 Dhaka Second Division Football League =

Dhaka Second Division Football League
- Season: 2021–22
- Dates: 10 August 2022–21 December 2022
- Champions: Saif Sporting Club Youth Team (1st title)
- Promoted: Saif Sporting Club Youth Team; Siddikbazar Dhaka Jr. SC
- Matches: 105
- Goals: 218 (2.08 per match)
- Top goalscorer: 14 goals (Bangladesh) Saifullah Sardar (Jabid Ahsan Sohel KC)

The 2021–22 Dhaka Second Division Football League, also known as Bashundhara Group Second Division Football League for sponsorship reasons. A total of 18 teams, divided into two groups of nine teams, participating in the league. The winner of the league is promoted to Senior Division League.

Saif Sporting Club Youth Team is the current 2021–22 season champion.

== Overview before the season ==
A total of 18 teams will join the league, including five promoted from 2019–20 Dhaka Third Division Football League.

Teams promoted from Third Division

- Alamgir Somaj Kollayan O Krira Sangshad
- Bikrampur Kings
- Jabid Ahsan Sohel Krira Chakra
- Kingstar Sporting Club
- Kallol Sangho

Other teams

- Arambagh Football Academy
- Bangladesh Krira Shikkha Protishtan football team
- City Club
- Saif Sporting Club Youth Team
- Khilgaon Football Academy
- Gouripur Sporting Club
- Little Friends Club
- B.G. Press Sports and Recreation Club
- Siddikbazar Dhaka Junior Sporting Club
- Kodomtola Sangshad
- Tongi Krira Chakra
- Purbachal Parishad
- Jatrabari Jhotika Sangshad

== Format ==
This edition of Second Division League is made up of a total of 18 clubs divided into two groups of 9 teams. The nine teams in each group play each other once. After completing the group stage of the league, the five teams that accumulate the most points in each group, qualify for the Super League round and bottom placed team from each group will be relegated.

In Super League round, ten teams will compete for promotion. The top three teams will be promoted to next edition of Senior Division League.

== Venue ==
The opening ceremony and opening match was held at Bashundhara Kings Arena of Bashundhara Sports Complex, Dhaka.

The rest of the matches were played at Bir Sherestha Shaheed Shipahi Mostafa Kamal Stadium of Kamalapur, Dhaka.

Dhaka	2021–22 Dhaka Second Division Football League is located in Bangladesh
BSSS Mostafa Kamal Stadium	2021–22 Dhaka Second Division Football League is located in Bangladesh
Capacity: 25,000	2021–22 Dhaka Second Division Football League is located in Bangladesh

== Groups ==
=== Group A ===
==== League table ====
Pos	Team	Pld	W	D	L	GF	GA	GD	Pts	Qualification or relegation
1	Jabid Ahsan Sohel KC	8	4	1	3	10	9	+1	13	Qualification for the Super League
2	Dhaka Jr. SC	8	4	1	3	10	9	+1	13	Qualification for the Super League
3	Little Friends Club	8	4	1	3	7	6	+1	13	Qualification for the Super League
4	BG Press SRC	6	3	2	1	8	4	+4	11	
5	Gouripur SC	8	3	2	3	6	6	0	11	Qualification for the Super League
6	BKSP FT	8	3	1	4	10	13	−3	10	
7	Arambagh FA	8	1	6	1	6	5	+1	9	
8	Bikrampur Kings	7	2	1	4	6	8	−2	7	
9	Khilgaon FA	7	1	3	3	3	6	−3	6	Relegation to the Third Division League

Source: BFF
Rules for classification: 1) Points; 2) Goal difference; 3) Goals scored;

=== Group B ===
==== League table ====
Pos	Team	Pld	W	D	L	GF	GA	GD	Pts	Qualification or relegation
1	Saif Youth Team	8	5	3	0	11	2	+9	18	Qualification for the Super League
2	Purbachal Parishad	8	4	3	1	11	9	+2	15	Qualification for the Super League
3	Kodomtola Sangshad	8	4	2	2	9	4	+5	14	Qualification for the Super League
4	Kingstar SC	8	3	3	2	8	6	+2	12	Qualification for the Super League
5	Kallol Sangho	8	3	3	2	10	9	+1	12	Qualification for the Super League
6	City Club	8	1	5	2	5	8	−3	8	
7	Jatrabari JS	8	1	3	4	2	10	−8	6	
8	Tongi Krira Chakra	8	1	3	4	6	9	−3	6	
9	Alamgir Somaj Kollayan KS	8	0	3	5	4	9	−5	3	Relegation to the Third Division League

Source: BFF
Rules for classification: 1) Points; 2) Goal difference; 3) Goals scored;

== Super League ==
=== League table ===
Pos	Team	Pld	W	D	L	GF	GA	GD	Pts	Qualification
1	Saif Youth Team	7	6	1	0	12	4	+8	19	Qualification for the 2022–23 Dhaka Senior Division Football League
2	Dhaka Jr. SC	8	6	0	2	17	7	+10	18	Qualification for the 2022–23 Dhaka Senior Division Football League
3	Jabid Ahsan Sohel KC	7	4	2	1	15	7	+8	14	
4	Purbachal Parishad	8	3	2	3	10	8	+2	11	
5	Gouripur SC	8	3	2	3	9	10	−1	11	
6	Kingstar SC	8	3	2	3	10	12	−2	11	
7	Little Friends Club	8	3	1	4	8	12	−4	10	
8	Kodomtola Sangshad	8	0	3	5	3	9	−6	3	
9	Kallol Sangho	8	0	1	7	2	17	−15	1	

Source: BFF
Rules for classification: 1) Points; 2) Goal difference; 3) Goals scored;

== Statistics ==
=== Goalscorers ===
There were 218 goals scored in 105 matches, for an average of 2.08 goals per match.

14 goals

- (Bangladesh) Saifullah Sardar (Jabid Ahsan Sohel KC)

12 goals

- (Bangladesh) Iftsham Rahman Zidan (Kingstar Sporting Club)

8 goals

- (Bangladesh) Sujon Sheikh (Jabid Ahsan Sohel KC)

7 goals

- (Bangladesh) Mohammad Newoaj (Purbachal Parishad)
- (Bangladesh) Sheikh Ahammad (Siddikbazar Dhaka Jr. SC)
- (Bangladesh) Md Jubayer Ahmed (Saif Sporting Club Youth Team)

4 goals

- (Bangladesh) Iqbal (Kallol Sangha)
- (Bangladesh) Nayim (B.G. Press SRC)
- (Bangladesh) Monjurul Islam Parvez (Purbachal Parishad)

3 goals

- (Bangladesh) Noor Alam Siddik (Saif Sporting Club Youth Team)
- (Bangladesh) Sabbir (Tongi Krira Chakra)
- (Bangladesh) Muhammad Sumon (Bikrampur Kings)
- (Bangladesh) Abdul Halim (BKSP)
- (Bangladesh) Md Yamin Rana (Little Friends Club)
- (Bangladesh) Yasin Arafat Sifat (Little Friends Club)
- (Bangladesh) Jubair Imon (Kallol Sangha)

2 goals

- (Bangladesh) Imon (BKSP)
- (Bangladesh) Touhidul (City Club)
- (Bangladesh) Fazlul (City Club)
- (Bangladesh) Al-Amin (Tongi Krira Chakra)
- (Bangladesh) Al-Mirad (BKSP)
- (Bangladesh) Emon (Jatrabari JS)
- (Bangladesh) Mahmudul (Saif Sporting Club Youth Team)
- (Bangladesh) Muttalid (BKSP)
- (Bangladesh) Shawon (Siddikbazar Dhaka Jr. SC)
- (Bangladesh) Nayim (Kadamtola Sangsad)
- (Bangladesh) Khokon (Saif Sporting Club Youth Team)
- (Bangladesh) Muttalib (Arambagh FA)
- (Bangladesh) Atikur (Kadamtola Sangsad)
- (Bangladesh) Abidul (Kadamtola Sangsad)
- (Bangladesh) Habib (Gouripur Sporting Club)
- (Bangladesh) Talha (Arambagh FA)
- (Bangladesh) Md Mujahid Islam (Little Friends Club)
- (Bangladesh) Asif Rahman (Gouripur Sporting Club)
- (Bangladesh) Sumon (Jabid Ahsan Sohel KC)
- (Bangladesh) Apu Sardar (Saif Sporting Club Youth Team)
- (Bangladesh) Omar Faruk Ontor (Gouripur Sporting Club)
- (Bangladesh) Ratul (Little Friends Club)
- (Bangladesh) Shamol Hossain (Saif Sporting Club Youth Team)
- (Bangladesh) Al Amin Howladar (Gouripur Sporting Club)
- (Bangladesh) Saiful Sardar (Kadamtola Sangsad)
- (Bangladesh) Didarul Islam (Purbachal Parishad)
- (Bangladesh) Naimur Hasan Rakib (Saif Sporting Club Youth Team)

1 goal

- (Bangladesh) Sohag (B.G. Press SRC)
- (Bangladesh) Shamim (Khilgaon Football Academy)
- (Bangladesh) Aman (Khilgaon Football Academy)
- (Bangladesh) Saidur (Alamgir Samaj Kallan O Krira Sangsad)
- (Bangladesh) Amirul (Kadamtola Sangsad)
- (Bangladesh) Didarul (Kallol Sangha)
- (Bangladesh) Tanvir (Little Friends Club)
- (Bangladesh) Atikur (Khilgaon Football Academy)
- (Bangladesh) Rabbi (Arambagh FA)
- (Bangladesh) Amzad (Alamgir Samaj Kallan O Krira Sangsad)
- (Bangladesh) Ayob (Purbachal Parishad)
- (Bangladesh) Gousul Akbor (Kingstar Sporting Club)
- (Bangladesh) Maksudur Rahman (Kallol Sangha)
- (Bangladesh) Rabbani (Tongi Krira Chakra)
- (Bangladesh) Shohag (Arambagh FA)
- (Bangladesh) Noyon (Alamgir Samaj Kallan O Krira Sangsad)
- (Bangladesh) Hasan (City Club)
- (Bangladesh) Asriful (Bikrampur Kings)
- (Bangladesh) Jisan (B.G. Press SRC)
- (Bangladesh) Monjurul (Purbachal Parishad)
- (Bangladesh) Naeem (Kadamtola Sangsad)
- (Bangladesh) Milon (Alamgir Samaj Kallan O Krira Sangsad)
- (Bangladesh) Rofiqul (Siddikbazar Dhaka Jr. SC)
- (Bangladesh) Asas (Kingstar Sporting Club)
- (Bangladesh) Omar (Kingstar Sporting Club)
- (Bangladesh) Shuvo (BKSP)
- (Bangladesh) Asif (Gouripur Sporting Club)
- (Bangladesh) Mehedi (Gouripur Sporting Club)
- (Bangladesh) Shawon (City Club)
- (Bangladesh) Sumon (Saif Sporting Club Youth Team)
- (Bangladesh) Al Amin (Kallol Sangha)
- (Bangladesh) Abul Kalam (Purbachal Parishad)
- (Bangladesh) Hridoy (Bikrampur Kings)
- (Bangladesh) Ruhul (Jabid Ahsan Sohel KC)
- (Bangladesh) Nehemiah (B.G. Press SRC)
- (Bangladesh) Rana(Jatrabari JS)
- (Bangladesh) Redwan (Kallol Sangha)
- (Bangladesh) Nishan (B.G. Press SRC)
- (Bangladesh) Ashikur (Kadamtola Sangsad)
- (Bangladesh) Kamran (Jabid Ahsan Sohel KC)
- (Bangladesh) Rajib (Siddikbazar Dhaka Jr. SC)
- (Bangladesh) Sabbir (Little Friends Club)
- (Bangladesh) Etun (Purbachal Parishad)
- (Bangladesh) Sohel Rana (Kingstar Sporting Club)
- (Bangladesh) Tonmoy Mondol (Gouripur Sporting Club)
- (Bangladesh) Sakib Ali (Saif Sporting Club Youth Team)
- (Bangladesh) Sagor Molla (Kallol Sangha)
- (Bangladesh) Gourov Shuvo (Purbachal Parishad)
- (Bangladesh) Shamol Mia (Jabid Ahsan Sohel KC)
- (Bangladesh) Mehedi Hasan (Siddikbazar Dhaka Jr. SC)
- (Bangladesh) Hora Ghosh (Kingstar Sporting Club)
- (Bangladesh) Sobuj Hossain (Gouripur Sporting Club)
- (Bangladesh) Ahead Islam Sagor (Little Friends Club)
- (Bangladesh) Johirul Islam (Kingstar Sporting Club)
- (Bangladesh) Anisur Rahman (Gouripur Sporting Club)
- (Bangladesh) Md. Rohan (Kadamtola Sangsad)
- (Bangladesh) Kazi Sajid Sumon (Siddikbazar Dhaka Jr. SC)
- (Bangladesh) Saimon (Saif Sporting Club Youth Team)
- (Bangladesh) Aung Chokhen (Purbachal Parishad)
- (Bangladesh) Mehedi Hasan (Jabid Ahsan Sohel KC)

1 own goal

- (Bangladesh) Md. Asif Rahman (Gouripur Sporting Club)
- (Bangladesh) Anisur Sheikh (Kingstar Sporting Club)

Unknown goalscorers

- Bikrampur Kings 1-3 Siddikbazar Dhaka Jr. SC match of 4 goals scorers players name unknown.
- Arambagh FA 0-1 Siddikbazar Dhaka Jr. SC match of 1 goals scorers players name unknown.
- B.G. Press SRC 0-1 Little Friends Club match of 1 goals scorers players name unknown.
- Super League: Gouripur SC 3-5 Siddikbazar Dhaka Jr. SC match of 8 goals scorers players name unknown.
- Super League: Kallol Sangha 0-4 Siddikbazar Dhaka Jr. SC match of 4 goals scorers players name unknown.
- Super League: Purbachal Parishad 0-1 Saif Sporting Club Youth Team match of 1 goal scorers players name unknown.
- Super League: Kadamtola Sangsad 0-1 Siddikbazar Dhaka Jr. SC match of 1 goal scorers players name unknown.

== See also ==
- 2021–22 Dhaka Senior Division Football League
