= Otabek Valizhonov =

Uzbekistani footballer (born 1984)

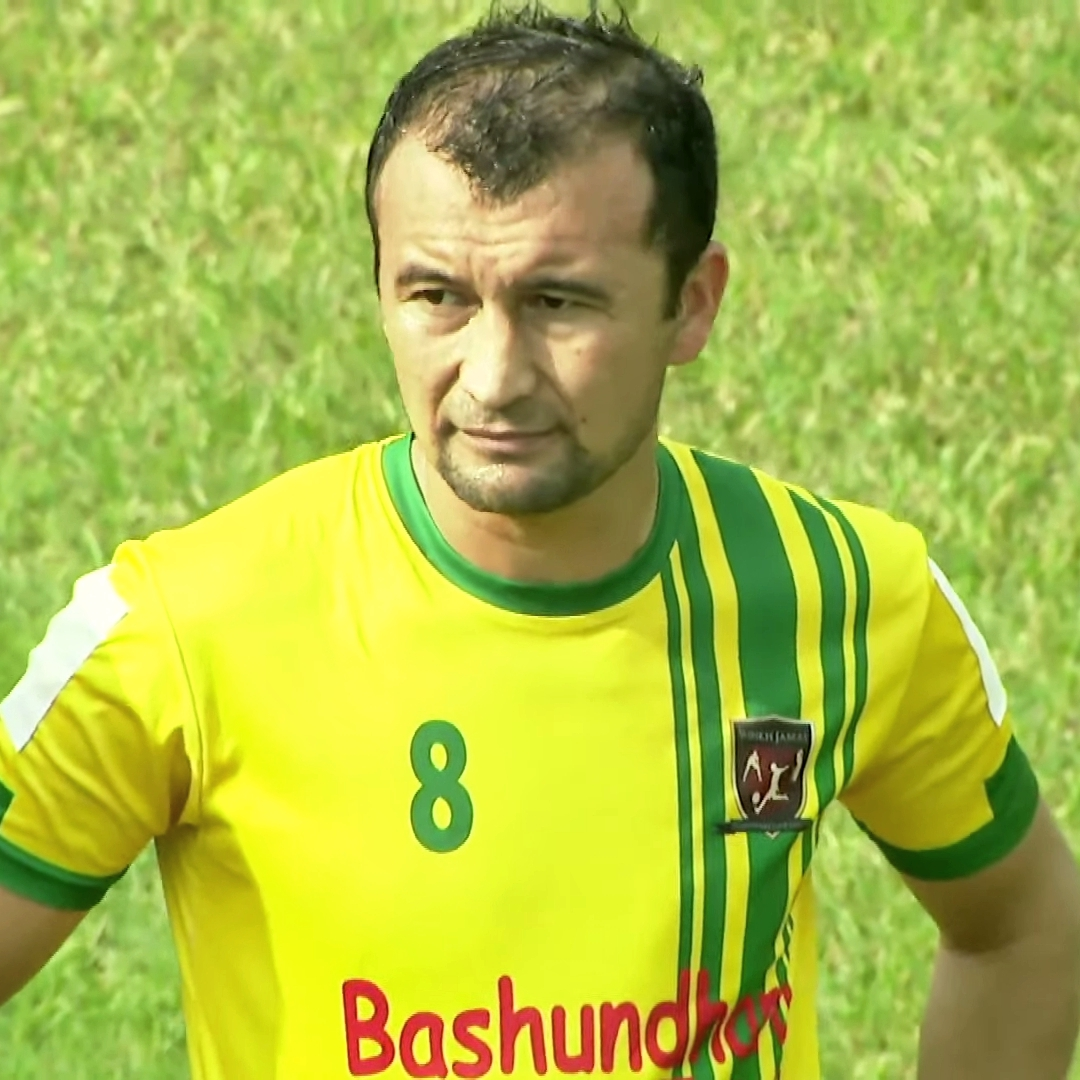
- Valizhonov with Sheikh Jamal DC in 2022

Personal information
- Full name: Otabek Erkinovich Valizhonov
- Date of birth: 8 April 1989 (age 37)
- Place of birth: Toʻraqoʻrgʻon, Uzbekistan
- Height: 1.74 m (5 ft 9 in)
- Positions: Midfielder; forward

Senior career*
Years	Team	Apps	(Gls)
2010–2011	PFC Navbahor	43	(6)
2012	FC Shurtan Guzar	8	(0)
2012	FK Andijon	9	(2)
2012–2013	FC Shurtan Guzar	0	(0)
2013–2014	PFK Nurafshon	17	(0)
2014–2016	PFC Navbahor	41	(5)
2016	FK Andijon	11	(2)
2016–2017	FC AGMK	9	(1)
2017–2018	FC Sogdiana	10	(1)
2018–2019	Team BJMC	21	(6)
2019–2020	Brothers Union	5	(3)
2020–2023	Sheikh Jamal DC	57	(17)
2023–2024	Brothers Union	7	(2)

International career^{‡}
2010	Uzbekistan U21	1	(0)
	Uzbekistan U23	3	(0)
- * Club domestic league appearances and goals as of 9 February 2024 ‡ National team caps and goals as of 28 February 2020

Otabek Valizhonov (born 10 May 1984), sometimes spelled as Otabek Valijonov, is a former Uzbek footballer who last played as an attacking midfielder or second striker for Bangladesh Premier League club Brothers Union. He is a versatile playmaker who can play in various positions of forward line.

== Club career ==
=== In Bangladesh ===
In 2018, Otabek joined his first club outside of Uzbekistan signing for Bangladesh Premier League club Team BJMC. He scored 6 goals in 21 matches with BJMC in his first league season, but could not save his team from relegation.

In 2019, Otabek joined Brothers Union from same league. He scored 3 goals playing 5 matches in 2019–20 league before the league was cancelled due to COVID-19 pandemic in Bangladesh.

In 2020, Otabek moved to Sheikh Jamal Dhanmondi Club, one of the top clubs of Bangladesh. He scored 7 goals in the Premier League in 22 matches in his first season with the club. In the next season, he scored the same number of league goals playing two fewer matches.

In 2023, he returned to Brothers Union for his second-stint at the club.

== Honours ==
Sheikh Jamal DC

- Bangladesh Premier League runner-up: 2020–21
