= Khalekurzaman Sabuj =

Bangladeshi footballer

Personal information
- Full name: Mohamed Khalekurzaman Sabuj
- Date of birth: 22 December 1995 (age 30)
- Place of birth: Kurigram, Bangladesh
- Height: 1.63 m (5 ft 4 in)
- Positions: Left-back; left winger

Senior career*
Years	Team	Apps	(Gls)
2011–2012	Basabo TS		
2013–2017	Uttar Baridhara		(5)
2017–2023	Sheikh Russel KC	93	(3)
2024–2025	Dhaka Wanderers	0	(0)

International career^{‡}
2017	Bangladesh U23	2	(0)
- * Club domestic league appearances and goals as of 24 February 2024 ‡ National team caps and goals as of 23 July 2017

Khalekurzaman Sabuj (Bengali: খালেকুরুজ্জামান সবুজ; born 22 December 1995) is a Bangladeshi professional footballer who plays as a left-back. He most recently played for Bangladesh Premier League club Dhaka Wanderers.

== Honours ==
Basabo Tarun Sangha

- Dhaka Second Division Football League: 2012

Uttar Baridhara Club

- Bangladesh Championship League: 2014–15

Individual

- 2015–16 – BFSF-BPL Football Awards Best Defender.
