= Bangladeshi football league system =

Series of interconnected leagues

- Country: Bangladesh
- Sport: Association football
- Promotion and relegation: Yes (Men); No (Women)

National system
- Federation: Bangladesh Football Federation
- Confederation: AFC
- Top division: Bangladesh Football League (Men); Women's Football League (Women)
- Second division: Championship League
- Cup competition: Challenge Cup; Federation Cup; Independence Cup

The Bangladeshi football league system contains two wide open national professional leagues, three Dhaka based semi-professional leagues and one age-level amateur league.

== System by period ==
=== Pre-independence era (1948–1970) ===
The semi-professional Dhaka Football League consisted of the First Division, Second Division, and Third Division. Established during the British Raj, the league system was revived in 1948 following the Partition of India. Although the First and Second Divisions resumed competition that year, the Third Division was not reinstated until 1951. Unlike district football leagues, which were administered by their respective district sports associations, the Dhaka Football League served as the premier football competition of East Pakistan and was governed by the Dhaka Sports Association (DSA) from 1948 to 1950, before being renamed the East Pakistan Sports Association (EPSA) and later merged into the East Pakistan Sports Federation (EPSF) in 1951. The EPSF subsequently administered the league until 1970. Contemporary reports published by The Pakistan Observer (now The Bangladesh Observer) also indicate that a Fourth Division operated between 1966 and 1969.

Professional leagues
Semi-professional leagues
Amateur leagues

Season	Tier 1	Tier 2	Tier 3	Tier 4	Tier 5	Tier 6
1948–1950	Dhaka First Division League	Dhaka Second Division League				
1951–1965	Dhaka First Division League	Dhaka Second Division League	Dhaka Third Division League			
1966–1969	Dhaka First Division League	Dhaka Second Division League	Dhaka Third Division League	Dhaka Fourth Division League		
1970	Dhaka First Division League	Dhaka Second Division League	Dhaka Third Division League			

=== Post-Independence (1971–present) ===
Semi-professional era (1971–2006)

Following the Bangladesh Liberation War in 1971, the Bangladesh Football Federation assumed control of the Dhaka Football League in 1972. In the absence of a national league, the semi-professional Dhaka Football League functioned as the country's highest football competition, with the First Division serving as the top-tier. The league champions were recognized as both the champions of Dhaka and Bangladesh. The amateur, age-based Bangladesh Pioneer League was introduced in 1981 as the permanent fourth-tier, expanding the league system. In 1993, the Dhaka Premier Division League replaced the First Division as the top-tier, while the First Division (1993–2006) became the second-tier, with both leagues forming the Senior Division, expanding the league system to five tiers. From 1985, the First Division champions earned qualification for the AFC Club Championship, with the qualification slot later being transferred to the Premier Division.

In 2000, the National Football League was introduced as a nationwide competition featuring the top teams from each district, including those from the Dhaka Premier Division. Although it was Bangladesh's first national football league, it operated as a standalone tournament outside the domestic league system and did not feature promotion or relegation. Following the reintroduction of the AFC Club Championship after the 2001–02 edition, qualification for continental competition was reserved exclusively for the winners of national competitions. With the introduction of the AFC Cup, the AFC's second-tier club competition, in 2004, qualification places were awarded to the champions of the National Football League and the winners of the Federation Cup.

Professional era (2007–present)

In 2007, the B.League was introduced as Bangladesh's first professional national league, later renamed the Bangladesh League in 2009, rebranded as the Bangladesh Premier League in 2012, and finally renamed the Bangladesh Football League in 2025. The Premier Division and First Division merged to form the new second-tier, the Dhaka Senior Division League. The professional league allowed clubs outside Dhaka to participate and had no relegation until the 2008–09 season. Senior Division champions and runners-up earned promotion only if they met professional league licensing criteria. In 2009, the Bashundhara Club Cup Championship, a one-time tournament, saw its winners and runners-up qualify for the 2009–10 professional League. The introduction of the Bangladesh Championship League in 2012 established a permanent promotion-relegation system, with relegated clubs from the 2010 season joining the second-tier professional national league.

Professional leagues
Semi-professional leagues
Amateur leagues

Season	Tier 1	Tier 2	Tier 3	Tier 4	Tier 5	Tier 6
1971–1980	Dhaka First Division League	Dhaka Second Division League	Dhaka Third Division League			
1981–1992	Dhaka First Division League	Dhaka Second Division League	Dhaka Third Division League	Bangladesh Pioneer League		
1993–2006	Dhaka Premier Division League	Dhaka First Division League (1993–2006)	Dhaka Second Division League	Dhaka Third Division League	Bangladesh Pioneer League	
2007–2011	Bangladesh Football League (Note: Named "B.League" from 2007 to 2009, "Bangladesh League" from 2009 to 2011, "Bangladesh Premier League" from 2012 to 2025, "Bangladesh Football League" since 2025.)	Dhaka Senior Division League	Dhaka Second Division League	Dhaka Third Division League	Bangladesh Pioneer League	
2012–present	Bangladesh Football League	Bangladesh Championship League	Dhaka Senior Division League	Dhaka Second Division League	Dhaka Third Division League	Bangladesh Pioneer League

== Men's system ==
As of February 2025.

Level	Division	Class
1	Bangladesh Football League; 10 clubs (substituted off) teams relegated	Professional
2	Bangladesh Championship League; 10 clubs (substituted on) 2 teams promoted (substituted off) 2 teams relegated	Professional
3	Dhaka Senior Division League; 18 clubs (substituted on) 4 teams promoted (substituted off) 2 teams relegated	Semi-professional
4	Dhaka Second Division League; 15 clubs (substituted on) 2 teams promoted (substituted off) 2 teams relegated	Semi-professional
5	Dhaka Third Division League; 15 clubs (substituted on) 2 teams promoted (substituted off) 2 teams relegated	Semi-professional
6	Bangladesh Pioneer League; Unlimited number of clubs (substituted on) 4 teams promoted No relegation	Amateur

== Regional leagues ==
The district football leagues in Bangladesh are administered by their respective District Football Associations (DFA), all of which were established across the country's 64 districts in 2008. These associations operate under the supervision of the District Football League Committee of the Bangladesh Football Federation (BFF). With the exception of the Dhaka Football League, district leagues function outside the national football league pyramid. Although district football leagues officially exist in every district, many are currently inactive or nonoperational. Notably, Mymesingh and Khulna have two of the oldest football leagues in the country.

== Qualification for cups ==
=== Domestic cups ===
The primary domestic cup competition in Bangladesh is the Federation Cup. The cup competition is currently only open to Bangladesh Football League clubs and runs simultaneously with the league season. The winners of the tournament were previously given entry to the preliminary stages of the AFC Cup. The Independence Cup is mainly open to Premier League clubs, however, Services teams and Bangladesh Championship League clubs are also eligible to participate given they receive permission from the Bangladesh Football Federation (BFF).

=== Continental competition ===
As of the 2025–26 season, the Bangladesh Football League champions qualify for the AFC Challenge League preliminary stage. However, if the league champions are not able to attain AFC licensing, league runners-up, given they have attained the proper license, or Federation Cup winners are elected to participate in AFC competitions.

== Women's system ==
Level	Division	Class
1	Bangladesh Women's Football League; 9 clubs No relegation	Semi-professional

== See also ==
- Football in Bangladesh
- List of Bangladeshi football champions
