= Dhaka Senior Division Football League =

Bangladeshi third-tier football league founded 1948

- Organising bodies: Bangladesh Football Federation (BFF)
- Founded: 2007; 19 years ago
- First season: 2007
- Country: Bangladesh
- Confederation: AFC
- Number of clubs: 17
- Level on pyramid: 2 (2007–2011); 3 (2012–present)
- Promotion to: Bangladesh Championship League
- Relegation to: Dhaka Second Division League
- Current champions: Jatrabari KC (1st title) (2025–26)
- Most championships: Fakirerpool (3 titles)
- Broadcaster(s): Bangladesh Football Federation (on Facebook and YouTube)
- Website: bff.com.bd
- Current: 2025–26 Dhaka Senior Division League

Dhaka Senior Division Football League (Bengali: ঢাকা সিনিয়র ডিভিশন ফুটবল লিগ), or the First Division Football League, is the third-tier football league in Bangladesh. It is the top division of the Dhaka Football League and, although it is a district football league, it has allowed entry to teams from outside Dhaka.

Upon the creation of the country's first national top-tier professional football league, the B. League in 2007, the Dhaka Premier Division League was merged with Dhaka First Division League, and re-introduced as the second-tier football league, the sole Dhaka Senior Division League. Finally, after the introduction of a national second-tier professional football league, the Bangladesh Championship League in 2012, it became the third-tier.

The league is the highest level of semi-professional football in the country, and the two top-finishing teams are automatically promoted to professional football through the Bangladesh Championship League. The league is run by Dhaka Metropolitan Football League Committee (DMFLC) under the supervision of Bangladesh Football Federation (BFF).

== History ==
In 2007, the B.League was launched as the country's new top-tier and first ever professional football league by the Bangladesh Football Federation. The B.League now known as the Bangladesh Football League, allows clubs outside of Dhaka to participate, as BFF attempted to decentralise domestic football. With the introduction of the new top-tier, the Dhaka Premier Division League was merged with the Dhaka First Division League (second-tier 1993–2007), and re-introduced as the country's new second-tier, Dhaka Senior Division Football League. In 2012, after the introduction of a second-tier professional football league, the Bangladesh Championship League, which is also open to clubs outside of Dhaka, it became the third-tier. The winner and runner-up of the semi-professional league will enter professional football through the Bangladesh Championship League, while the bottom three teams will be relegated to the Dhaka Second Division League.

== Structure ==
As of February 2025.

Level	Division	Class
1	Bangladesh Football League; 10 clubs ↓ 2 relegation spot	Professional
2	Bangladesh Championship League; 10 clubs ↑ 2 teams promoted ↓ 2 teams relegated	Professional
3	Dhaka Senior Division League; 18 clubs ↑ 4 teams promoted ↓ 2 teams relegated	Semi-professional
4	Dhaka Second Division League; 15 clubs ↑ 2 teams promoted ↓ 2 teams relegated	Semi-professional
5	Dhaka Third Division League; 15 clubs ↑ 2 teams promoted ↓ 2 teams relegated	Semi-professional
6	Bangladesh Pioneer League; Unlimited number of clubs ↑ 4 teams promoted No relegation	Amateur

== Sponsorship ==
Period	Sponsor	Tournament name
2012–13	Popular Life Insurance	Popular Life Insurance Senior Division Football League
2014	Bengal Group of Industries	Bengal Group Dhaka Senior Division League
2017	Saif Powertec	Saif Powertec Senior Division Football League
2018–19	TVS Motor Company	TVS Senior Division Football League/TVS Dhaka Metropolis Senior Division Football League.
2021–2024	Bashundhara Group	Bashundhara Group Senior Division Football League

== Previous winners ==
(2007–present)
Year	Champions	Note
2007–08	Fakirerpool	Dhaka Premier Division League merged with the Dhaka First Division Football League and re-introduced as the Dhaka Senior Division League, the second-tier of the B.League. However, Fakirerpool were not invited to enter the 2008–09 B.League.
2008–09	Not held	The winners and runners-up of the Bashundhara Club Cup Championship Football were given entry to the 2009–10 Bangladesh League (B.League).
2010	Fakirerpool	The champions, Fakirerpool, and the runners-up, Victoria SC, were both denied entry to the 2010–11 Bangladesh League (B.League).
2011	Not held	
2012–13	Badda Jagoroni	Introduction of the Bangladesh Championship League as the second-tier, saw the league become the third-tier of the Bangladesh Football League (Bangladesh League).
2013–14	Not held	
2014	Fakirerpool	
2015	Not held	
2016	Not held	
2017	Swadhinata	
2018–19	Kawran Bazar	
2019–20	Not held	
2020–21	Not held	
2021–22	Somaj Kallyan	The champions, Somaj Kallyan KS Mugda, and the runners-up, Jatrabari KC, failed to attain professional league license, thus, third-place, PWD Sports Club, were promoted to the 2023–24 Bangladesh Championship League.
2022–23	Not held	
2023–24	Not completed	Abandoned due to the 2024 Bangladesh quota reform movement.
2024–25	Not held	
2025–26	Jatrabari KC	

== Champions ==
=== Champions by tier ===
The list contains the total number of league titles that each club has attained by its different tiers.

Club	Titles	Winning years
Second tier (2007–2011)
Fakirerpool	2	2007–08, 2010
Third tier (2012–present)
Badda Jagoroni	1	2012–13
Fakirerpool	1	2014
Swadhinata	1	2017
Kawran Bazar	1	2018–19
Somaj Kallyan	1	2021–22
Jatrabari KC	1	2025–26

=== Champions by team ===
The list includes the total number of league titles each club has attained.

Club	Titles	Winning years
Fakirerpool	3	2007–08, 2010, 2014
Badda Jagoroni	1	2012–13
Swadhinata	1	2017
Kawran Bazar	1	2018–19
Somaj Kallyan	1	2021–22
Jatrabari KC	1	2025–26

== Top scorers ==
Year	Nationality	Player	Club	Goals	Source
2021–22	(Bangladesh)	Munna Biswas	Somaj Kallyan	9	
2025–26	(Bangladesh)	Md Masrafi Islam	Mohakhali Ekadosh	18	

== See also ==
- Dhaka Football League
- Football in Bangladesh
