= Bangladesh Krira Shikkha Protishtan football team =

Bangladeshi association football club

Bangladesh Krira Shikkha Protishtan
- Full name: Bangladesh Krira Shikkha Protishtan football team
- Nickname: BKSP
- Founded: 14th March 1986; 40 years ago
- Ground: Various
- Owner: BKSP
- Director General: Brigadier General A. K. M. Majharul Haq
- Head coach: SM Imrul Hasan
- League: Dhaka Second Division Football League
- 2026–27 season: TBD
- Website: bksp.gov.bd

Bangladesh Krira Shikkha Protishtan football team (Bengali: বাংলাদেশ ক্রীড়া শিক্ষা প্রতিষ্ঠান ফুটবল দল) is a football team from Bangladesh, which represents the national sports institute Bangladesh Krira Shikkha Protishtan, and began playing in the mid-2000s. They currently participate in the Dhaka Second Division Football League, which is the fourth tier of Bangladeshi football. The team mainly consists of players under the age of 18, and has produced many professional footballers that have gone on to play for the Bangladesh national football team and youth national teams.

== History ==
BKSP's football activities started from 1986 with only 30 trainees and 2 coaches. In 2016, BKSP's Football Trainee Admission Program started, and the institution has set up training centers in Khulna, Dinajpur, Barisal and Sylhet. Former national team captains Mamunul Islam and Hassan Al-Mamun, along with many other notable football players have spent their youth careers at the institution. Masoud Rana was the first BKSP graduate to represent the national football team, making his international debut in 1991. Some of the institutions early success was found through the BKSP U-14 team, which won the Dana Cup in Denmark in 1990 and also the Gothia Cup in Sweden. The success was largely credited to the institution's first football coach, Monsur Ahmed Sattar.

During the 2013 Bangladesh Games, BKSP were crowned champions in football, after defeating Barisal District 2–1 in the final at the Bangabandhu National Stadium. Both goals came from forward Rohit Sarkar, who was later called up for the Bangladesh U20 team. In 2016, BKSP U14 team won the Subroto Cup sub-junior football tournament, and two years later they won the U-17 football tournament, both of which were held in India.

BKSP were crowned champions of the 2017 Walton U-18 National Football Championship, defeating Dhaka District team on penalties. In 2020, BKSP achieved one of their most notable victories by defeating Bangladesh Army in the services-zone final of the 2020 Bangabandhu National Football Championship.

In 2022, BKSP partook in the Dhaka Second Division Football League, which started after a two-year gap. On 10 August 2022, BKSP defeated Bikrampur Kings 2–1, in the first game of the 2021–22 Dhaka Second Division Football League season. Muhammad Imon and Al-Mirad scored the goals for the team.

== Competitive record ==
BKSP has started their professional football campaign from the mid-2000s.

Season	Division	League								Federation Cup	Independence Cup	Top league scorer(s)	
Season	Division	P	W	D	L	GF	GA	Pts	Position	Federation Cup	Independence Cup	Player	Goals
2021–22	Dhaka Second Division Football League	8	3	1	4	10	13	10	12th	—	—	—	—

== Team records ==
=== Coaching records ===
As of 4 July 2026

Head Coach	From	To	P	W	D	L	GS	GA	%W
(Bangladesh) SM Imrul Hasan	10 May 2026	Present	1	1	0	0	2	0	100.00

== Honours ==
=== Semi-professional League ===
- Dhaka Second Division League
  - Champions (1): 2025–26

=== Youth tournaments ===
- U-14 Gothia Cup
  - Winner (1): 1990
- U-14 Dana Cup
  - Winner (1): 1990
- U-18 National Football Championship
  - Winner (1): 2017
- Bangladesh Games
  - Winner (1): 2013
- U-17 Subroto Cup
  - Winner (1): 2018
  - Runners-up (1): 2019
- U-14 Subroto Cup
  - Winner (1): 2016
  - Runners-up (2): 2008, 2003

== See also ==
- Bangladesh Krira Shikkha Protishtan
- Dhaka University football team
