= 2021–22 Swadhinata KS season =

Swadhinata KS
2021–22 season
- General Secretary: Syed Saifur Rahman Tulu
- Head coach: Masud Alam Jahangir
- Stadium: Shaheed Ahsan Ullah Master Stadium and Munshigonj District Stadium
- Bangladesh Premier League: 12th (Relegated)
- Federation Cup: Quarter-finals
- Independence Cup: Quarter-finals
- Top goalscorer: League: Nedo Turković (4 goals); All: Nedo Turković (6 goals)
- Biggest win: 3–2 Vs Rahmatganj MFS (3 December 2021)
- Biggest defeat: 5–1 Vs Saif Sporting Club (1 March 2022)

The 2021–22 Swadhinata KS season was the 1st competitive highest level season. This season will remarks 17th existence season overall in Bangladesh football. The season were covered from 1 October 2021 – 2 August 2022.

== Season summary ==
=== November ===
On 29 November Swadhinata KS has played their inaugural Independence Cup match against Dhaka Abahani and they have defeated by 2-1 goals. Only goal by Uzbekistan midfielder Nodir Mavlonov wasn't not enough to save the match.

=== December ===
On 3 December Swadhinata KS defeated Rahmatganj MFS by 3–2 goals. Early goal on 3 minutes by Philip Adjah give lead Rahmatganj MFS but in the 16 minutes score level by Rafał Zaborowski. In 25 minutes goal by Sanowar Hossain Rahmatganj MFS finished first half with score 2–1. In the second half scored level by Swadhinata KS Nedo Turković on 50 minutes. On 80 minutes second goal by Rafał Zaborowski gave lead 3–2 and Swadhinata KS ensured win.

On 10 December Swadhinata KS defeated against Saif Sporting Club by 0–2. First and second half both teams were goalless. In the 91 minutes goal by Saif Sporting Club Maraz Hossain and second goals on 99 minutes by Foysal Ahmed Fahim ensure their victory and Swadhinata KS eliminated from the tournament.

On 25 December 2021 Swadhinata KS won by 3–0 Walkover laws. The match were scheduled to play against Bashundhara Kings but Kings withdrew their name from the tournament.

On 27 December Swadhinata KS draw 1–1 goals against Dhaka Mohammedan. On 39 minutes Souleymane Diabate gave the lead Dhaka Mohammedan but after 1 minute Nedo Turković goal level score and finished first half. In the second half both team played goalless. Meanwhile, both team fair play point was same due to withdrawn Bashundhara Kings. Referee and match commissioner decided to determined group champion used penalty shoot out. Dhaka Mohammdan won by 4–3 goals.

=== January ===
On 2 December Swadhinata KS lost 2–0 goals against Saif Sporting Club. First half in 40 minutes goal by Rahim Uddin Saif Sporting Club hold a lead before half time. In the second half 71 minutes Maraz Hossain goal made score 2–0. Swadhinata KS didn't able to defend their lost and they have eliminated from the tournament.

=== February ===
On 3 February Swadhinata KS has played their away game versus Bashundhara Kings and won by 2–1 goals. On 25 minutes Nedo Turković penalty goal took lead and on 45+1 minutes goal by Rasel Ahmed made the score Swadhinata KS 2–0 before go to half time. In the second half time goal on 73 minutes by Bashundhara Kings Tawhidul Alam Sabuz made score 2–1 but Bashundhara Kings players couldn't found the net to score any goals to avoid the loss of the match.

On 10 February Dhaka Mohammedan defeated Swadhinata KS by 1–0 goal in the away match. In the first half both team are played excellent and competitive football at the end of first time scoreline were 0–0 goal. In the second half both team started attacking football to take lead and Dhaka Mohammedan got it by Souleymane Diabate on 77 minutes and made it 1–0 scoreline. In the 84 minutes Murad Hasan Swadhinata KS showed red card and sentoff him until end the match Swadhinata KS tried with their ten men's squad to find goal but they won't able avoid loss the game.

On 14 February Swadhinata KS drew 0–0 goal against Uttar Baridhara Club in the away game. In the first halftime both teams played excellent and competitive football and first halftime finished 0–0 goal. In the second halftime also both teams players hasn't found net and finished the game 0–0. They left the ground with 1 point.

On 19 February Swadhinata KS lost by 1–2 against Chittagong Abahani at home game. In the first halftime on 24 minutes goal by Peter Ebimobowei took lead Chittagong Abahani and finished halftime with 1–0 lead. In the second halftime on 71 minutes Omid Popalzay goal made scoreline 2–0 but after 8 minutes Mohammed Jahedul Alam reduced goals different for Swadhinata KS 1–2 goals.

On 25 February Swadhinata KS lost by 1–2 goals against Muktijoddha Sangsad KC in the away match. In the first half both teams played goalless. In the second half on 54 minutes Nedo Turković score gave lead Swadhinata KS but on 81 minutes Muktijoddha Sangsad KC equalized score 1–1 by own goal of Hasan Murad Swadhinata KS. After 2 minutes Japanese Tetsuaki Misawa goal made score 2–1 Muktijoddha Sangsad KC and Muktijoddha Sangsad KC graved the first victory of Premier League football.

=== March ===
On 1 March Swadhinta KS defeated by 1–5 goals to Saif Sporting Club at home game.

On 7 March Swadhinata KS defeated to Bangladesh Police FC by 2–4 goals at in the away match.

On 11 March Swadhinata KS drew against Dhaka Abahani by 1–1 at home ground.

On 16 March Swadhinata KS drew by 1–1 goals against Rahmatganj MFS in the away match. In the first half both teams played excellent and competitive football and at the end of the first half scoreline was 0–0. In the second half on 56 minutes Ghanaian forward Philip Adjah goal took lead Rahmatganj MFS but the club was not able to defend score for a long Swadhinata KS forward Zilliur Rahman goal on 64 minutes equalized score 1–1 goals. Rest of the time were not score any goals and both are share points.

=== April ===
On 3 April Swadhinata KS lost against Sheikh Jamal DC by 1–3 goals at home ground. In the first half on 29 and 38 minutes Gambian Matthew Chinedu goal Sheikh Jamal DC took lead and finished first half 0–2. In the second half on 53 minutes Nedo Turković goal made score 1–2. But Swadhinata KS couldn't able to avoid their defeat Matthew Chinedu hat trick goals on 67 minutes secured huge victory for Sheikh Jamal DC.

On 9 April Swadhinata KS lost to Sheikh Russel KC by 2–1 goals in the away game. On 13 Minutes defender Manik Hossain Molla and on 20 minutes penalty goal by Tajikistan defender Aizar Akmatov goal took lead by 2–0 score and finished first halftime. In the second halftime before referee added extra both teams were not found net but on 90+3 minutes a goal by Uzbekistan defender Nodir Mavlonov Swadhinata KS reduced score to 2–1.

On 24 April Swadhinata KS lost against Bashundhara Kings by 0–2 goals at home game. In the first half debutant Brazilian forward Miguel Figueira two goals on 28 and 35 minutes got lead Bashundhara Kings and finished half time. In the last 45 minutes both teams play defensive football and Bashundhara Kings took their very first game revenge against Swadhinata KS.

=== May ===
On 8 May Swadhinata KS have lost versus Uttar Baridhara Club by 0–2 goals at home game.

On 13 May Swadhinata KS have defeated by 2–3 goals against Chittagong Abahani in the away game.

=== June ===
On 23 June Swadhinata KS lost against Muktijoddha Sangsad KC by 0–1 goal at home game.

On 28 June Swadhinata KS have won versus Saif Sporting Club with score 2–1 in the away game.

=== July ===
On 4 July Swadhinata KS have lost by 0–1 goal versus Bangladesh Police FC in the ground.

On 14 July Swadhinata KS have defeated to Dhaka Abahani by 1–4 goals in the away match.

On 21 July Swadhinata KS have lost by 1–5 goals against Rahmatganj MFS at home game.

On 26 July Swadhinata KS have drew against Sheikh Jamal DC by 2–2 goals in the away game.

=== August ===
On 2 August Swadhinata KS have lost to Sheikh Russel KC with score 1–4 goals at home match.

== Current squad ==
Swadhinata KS squad for 2021–22 season.

As of 25 November 2021

Note: Flags indicate national team as defined under FIFA eligibility rules; some limited exceptions apply. Players may hold more than one non-FIFA nationality.

No.	Pos.	Nation	Player
1	GK	BAN	Sarwar Jahan
2	DF	BAN	Sazal Islam Kolin
3	DF	BAN	Hasan Murad Tipu
4	DF	BAN	Humayun Kabir Khan
5	DF	IRI	Siamak Kouroshi
6	MF	UZB	Nodir Mavlonov
7	MF	BAN	Abu Bokor
8	MF	BAN	Shakil Hossain
9	FW	BIH	Nedo Turković
10	MF	POL	Rafał Zaborowski
11	FW	BAN	Rasel Ahmed
12	MF	BAN	Joynal Abedin Dipu
13	DF	BAN	Rajon Howaladar
14	MF	BAN	Jamal Hossain
15	MF	BAN	Ekbal Hussain
16	MF	BAN	Mahmudul Hasan
17	FW	BAN	Emon Ali

No.	Pos.	Nation	Player
18	MF	BAN	Salim Reza
19	FW	BAN	Bishal Das
20	FW	BAN	Jahedul Alam
21	FW	BAN	Samrat Ahmed
22	GK	BAN	Razu Ahmed
23	MF	BAN	Mohammad Monayem
24	MF	BAN	Ashiqur Rahman
28	DF	BAN	Ashik Ahmed
29	MF	BAN	Sabbir Hossen
30	GK	BAN	Nasrul Islam Hero
32	MF	BAN	Abir Hossain
44	MF	BAN	Samimul Haque
55	DF	BAN	Murshed Ali
70	FW	BAN	Naim Uddin
77	FW	BAN	Zillur Rahman
90	GK	BAN	Rayhan Ali

== Pre-season friendly ==
18 November 2021	Swadhinta KS	1–2	Bashundhara Kings	Dhaka
15:00	Nodir Mavlonov 62'		Fahim Morshed 23'; Nova 56'	Stadium: Bashundhara Sports Complex

24 November 2021	Dhaka Mohammedan	4–5	Swadhinata KS	Dhaka
10:00 UTC+6	S. Diabate 4'; Bappy 26'; Ballu 56'; Anik 82'		N. Turković 2', 24', 76', 89'; Rasel Ahmed 32'	Stadium: BSSS Mostafa Kamal Stadium

23 January 2022	Sheikh Jamal DC	3–4	Swadhinata KS	Dhanmondi
13:00 UTC+6			Ziarur 3'; Shamim 32'; Nedo 67'; Zaheed 89'	Stadium: Dhanmondi Football Ground

== Transfer ==
=== In ===
No.	Pos	Player	Previous club	Fee	Date	Source
77	FW	(Bangladesh) Zillur Rahman	(Bangladesh) Fortis FC	Free transfer	3 September 2021	
14	FW	(Bosnia and Herzegovina) Nedo Turković	(Iraq) Al-Diwaniya FC	Free transfer	20 November 2021	
70	MF	(Uzbekistan) Nodirbek Mavlonov	(Uzbekistan) FK Andijon	Free transfer	20 November 2021	
5	CB	(Iran) Siamak Kouroshi	(Iran) Malavan F.C.	Free transfer	22 November 2021	
11	AM	(Poland) Rafał Zaborowski	(Romania) CS Pandurii Târgu Jiu	Free transfer	23 November 2021	
–	FW	(Brazil) Wallace Rogério	(Brazil) River Atlético Clube	Not disclosed	21 April 2022	
–	MF	(Brazil) Reinaldo Viana	(Brazil) Alagoinhas Atlético Clube	Not disclosed	21 April 2022	
33	CB	(Serbia) Ivan Marić	(Vietnam) SHB Da Nang FC	Not disclosed	21 April 2022	
–	MF	(Japan) Yuta Suzuki	(Malaysia) Kuching City F.C.	Not disclosed	21 April 2022	

== Competitions ==
Win Draw Loss Fixtures

=== Overall ===
Competition	First match	Last match	Final Position
Independence Cup	29 November 2021	10 December 2021	Quarter-finals
Federation Cup	25 December 2021	2 January 2022	Quarter-finals
BPL	3 February 2022	2 August 2022	12th

=== Overview ===
Competition	Record							
Competition	Pld	W	D	L	GF	GA	GD	Win %
Independence Cup	3	1	0	2	4	6	−2	33.33
Federation Cup	3	1	1	1	4	3	+1	33.33
BPL	22	2	4	16	22	50	−28	9.09
Total	28	4	5	19	30	59	−29	14.29

Source: Competitions

=== Independence Cup ===
==== Group A ====
Pos	Team	Pld	W	D	L	GF	GA	GD	Pts	Status
1	Dhaka Abahani	2	2	0	0	5	2	+3	6	Qualified for Knockout stage
2	Swadhinata KS	2	1	0	1	4	4	0	3	Qualified for Knockout stage
3	Rahmatganj MFS	2	0	0	2	3	6	−3	0	

Source: Global Sports Archive
Rules for classification: Group stage tiebreakers

29 November 2021	Swadhinata KS	1–2	Dhaka Abahani	Dhaka
17:45 BST (UTC+6)	Nodir 91'	Report	Royal 29'; Raphael 74'	Stadium: BSSS Mostafa Kamal Stadium; Referee: Jasim Akter

3 December 2021	Rahmatganj MFS	2–3	Swadhinata KS	Dhaka
17:45 BST (UTC+6)	Philip 3'; Sanowar 25'	Report	Rafal 16', 72'; Nedo 50'	Stadium: BSSS Mostafa Kamal Stadium; Referee: Md Alamgir Sarkar

==== Knockout stage ====
10 December 2021 Quarter-finals	Saif Sporting Club	2–0	Swadhinata KS	Dhaka
20:00 BST (UTC+6)	Maraz 91'; Foysal 99'	Report		Stadium: BSSS Mostafa Kamal Stadium; Referee: Md Alamgir

=== Federation Cup ===
==== Group A ====
Pos	Team	Pld	W	D	L	GF	GA	GD	Pts	Status
1	Dhaka Mohammedan	2	1	1	0	4	1	+3	4 (Note: As the fair play points of the two teams were equal, the group champion and runners-up were determined through a penalty shootout.Dhaka Mohammedan (4–3) Swadhinata KS.)	Advance to Knockout stage
2	Swadhinata KS	2	1	1	0	4	1	+3	4	Advance to Knockout stage
3	Bashundhara Kings	2	0	0	2	0	6	−6	0	Later withdrew

Source: Soccerway
Rules for classification: Group stage tiebreakers
Notes:

25 December 2022	Bashundhara Kings	0–3; Walkover	Swadhinata KS	Dhaka
16:00 BST (UTC+6)		Report		Stadium: BSSS Mostafa Kamal Stadium; Referee: Md Alamgir Sarkar
Note: Swadhinata KS were awarded walkover win by 3 goals since Bashundhara Kings didn't turn up for the match

27 December 2022	Dhaka Mohammedan	1–1 (4–3 p)	Swadhinata KS	Dhaka
16:00 BST (UTC+6)	Diabate 39'	Report	Nedo 40'	Stadium: BSSS Mostafa Kamal Stadium; Referee: Md Anisur Rahman Sagor
	Penalties
	Diabate (penalty scored); Jasmin (penalty scored); Saief (penalty scored); Obi Moneke (penalty scored); Aaron (penalty missed)		Nedo (penalty scored); Nodir (penalty scored); Samimul (penalty scored); Salim (penalty missed); Sajal (penalty missed)

==== Knockout stage ====
2 January 2022 Quarter-finals	Saif Sporting Club	2–0	Swadhinata KS	Dhaka
19:30 BST (UTC+6)	Rahim 40'; Maraz 71'	Report		Stadium: BSSS Mostafa Kamal Stadium; Referee: Mohammed Jalaluddin

=== Premier League ===
==== League table ====
Pos	Team	Pld	W	D	L	GF	GA	GD	Pts	Qualification or relegation
8	Bangladesh Police FC	22	8	6	8	28	32	−4	30	
9	Muktijoddha Sangsad KC	22	5	4	13	27	42	−15	19	
10	Rahmatganj MFS	22	4	6	12	33	46	−13	18	
11	Uttar Baridhara Club (R)	22	3	5	14	24	58	−34	14	Relegation to Bangladesh Championship League
12	Swadhinata KS (R)	22	2	4	16	22	50	−28	10	Relegation to Bangladesh Championship League

Source: Soccerway
Rules for classification: 1) Points; 2) Goal difference; 3) Goals scored.
(R) Relegated

==== Results summary ====
Overall								Home						Away					
Pld	W	D	L	GF	GA	GD	Pts	W	D	L	GF	GA	GD	W	D	L	GF	GA	GD
22	2	4	16	22	50	−28	10	0	2	9	6	26	−20	2	2	7	16	24	−8

Source: Soccerway

==== Results by round ====
Round	1	2	3	4	5	6	7	8	9	10	11	12	13	14	15	16	17	18	19	20	21	22
Ground	A	H	H	H	A	H	A	H	A	H	A	H	A	H	A	H	A	A	A	H	A	H
Result	W	L	D	L	L	L	L	D	D	L	L	L	L	L	L	L	W	L	L	L	D	L
Position	3	7	8	9	9	11	11	12	12	12	12	12	12	12	12	12	12	12	12	12	12	12

Source: Matches
A = Away; H = Home; W = Win; D = Draw; L = Loss; P = Postponed

=== Matches ===
3 February 2022 1	Bashundhara Kings	1–2	Swadhinata KS	Gazipur
16:00 BST (UTC+6)	S. Rana (yellow card) 33'; A. Fahad (yellow card) 45+3'; T. Sabuz 73'; O. Nawab (yellow card) 90+7'	Report	N. Turković 25' (pen.) (yellow card) 45+1'; S. Hossain (yellow card) 51'; R. Ahmed 45+1'; S. Jahan (yellow card) 90+3'	Stadium: Shaheed Ahsan Ullah Master Stadium; Referee: Md Alamgir Sarker

10 February 2022 2	Swadhinata KS	0–1	Dhaka Mohammedan	Munshigonj
15:00 BST (UTC+6)	Murad (yellow card) 20' (yellow-red card) 84'; Shakil (yellow card) 62'	Report	Newaz (yellow card) 26'; Diabate (yellow card) 74' (goal) 77'	Stadium: Munshigonj District Stadium; Referee: Bituraj Barua

14 February 2022 3	Uttar Baridhara Club	0–0	Swadhinata KS	Munshigonj
15:00 BST (UTC+6)	Arif (yellow card) 43'; Uttam (yellow card) 82'	Report	Salim (yellow card) 9'; Shakil (yellow card) 36'; Mavlonov (yellow card) 82'	Stadium: Munshigonj District Stadium; Referee: Md Alamgir Sarker

19 February 2022 4	Swadhinata KS	1–2	Chittagong Abahani	Rajshahi
15:00 BST (UTC+6)	Jahedul 79'	Report	Peter 24' (pen.); Shawkat (yellow card) 53'; Popalzay 71'; Twala (yellow card) 85' (red card); Saiful (yellow card) 94'	Stadium: Rajshahi District Stadium; Referee: Md Mizanur Rahman

25 February 2022 5	Muktijoddha Sangsad KC	2–1	Swadhinata KS	Gopalganj
15:00 BST (UTC+6)	Murad 81' (o.g.); Tetsuaki 83'; Sujon (yellow card) 84'	Report	Mavlonov (yellow card) 53'; Turković 54'	Stadium: Sheikh Fazlul Haque Mani Stadium; Referee: Md Anisur Rahman

1 March 2022 6	Swadhinata KS	1–5	Saif Sporting Club	Sylhet
15:00 BST (UTC+6)	Shakil (yellow card) 7'; Mavlonov 49'	Report	Emery 15'; Pappu (yellow card) 36'; Gafurov 46' (yellow card) 77'; Emeka 35', 70', 79'; Rafi (yellow card) 90+4'	Stadium: Sylhet District Stadium; Referee: Shorab Hossain

7 March 2022 7	Bangladesh Police FC	4–2	Swadhinata KS	Rajshahi
15:30 BST (UTC+6)	Kouskous 26'; Sharafi 44' (pen.), 61', 78'	Report	Salim (yellow card) 42'; Rafał 53'; Nedo 81' (pen.)	Stadium: Rajshahi District Stadium; Referee: Md Alamgir Sarker

11 March 2022 8	Swadhinata KS	1–1	Dhaka Abahani	Rajshahi
15:00 BST (UTC+6)	Ekbal 80'	Report	Jibon 39'; Jewel (yellow card) 69'; Mavlonov (yellow card) 90+1'; Emon (yellow card) 90+4'	Stadium: Rajshahi District Stadium; Referee: Bituraj Barua

18 March 2022 9	Rahmatganj MFS	1–1	Swadhinata KS	Sylhet
17:30 BST (UTC+6)	Tarek (yellow card) 32'; Enamul (yellow card) 51'; Philip 56'	Report	Zillur 64' (yellow card) 65'; Salim (yellow card) 77'	Stadium: Sylhet District Stadium; Referee: Mohammed Jalal Uddin

3 April 2022 10	Swadhinata KS	1–3	Sheikh Jamal DC	Rajshahi
15:30 BST (UTC+6)	Nedo 53'	Report	Chinedu 29', 38', 67'; Sillah (yellow card) 42'	Stadium: Rajshahi District Stadium; Referee: Bhubon Mohon Tarofder

9 April 2022 11	Sheikh Russel KC	2–1	Swadhinata KS	Dhaka
15:30 BST (UTC+6)	Manik 13'; Akmatov 20' (pen.)	Report	Murad (yellow card) 33'; Bokor (yellow card) 71'; Mavlonov 90+3'	Stadium: Bashundhara Kings Arena; Referee: Mizanur Rahman

24 April 2022 12	Swadhinata KS	0–2	Bashundhara Kings	Rajshahi
15:00 BST (UTC+6)	Shakil (yellow card) 42'	Report	Shafiei 28'; Figueira 35'; Biplu (yellow card) 84'	Stadium: Rajshahi District Stadium; Referee: Bhubon Mohon Torafder

1 May 2022 13	Dhaka Mohammedan	3–2	Swadhinata KS	Comilla
15:30 BST (UTC+6)	Diabate 13'; Moneke 35'; Farhad (yellow card) 39' (yellow-red card) 43'; Sahed 41'; Reardon (yellow card) 90+2'	Report	Onin (yellow card) 25'; Rasel 86'; Bishal 89'	Stadium: Comilla Stadium; Referee: Bituraj Barua

8 May 2022 14	Swadhinata KS	0–2	Uttar Baridhara Club	Rajshahi
15:45 BST (UTC+6)	Bokor (yellow card) 26'	Report	Kahraba 26', 90+4'; Fozilov (yellow card) 81'	Stadium: Rajshahi District Stadium; Referee: Bhubon Mohon Torafder

13 May 2022 15	Chittagong Abahani	3–2	Swadhinata KS	Cumilla
16:15 BST (UTC+6)	Soeb Mia (yellow card) 70'; Candy 74'; Peter 85', 88'	Report	Rasel (yellow card) 45'; Y. Suzuki (yellow card) 73'; Sabbir 76'; Bishal 90'	Stadium: Shaheed Dhirendranath Datta Stadium; Referee: Mohammed Jalal Uddin

23 June 2022 16	Swadhinata KS	0–1	Muktijoddha Sangsad KC	Rajshahi
15:30 BST (UTC+6)	Abu Bokor (yellow card) 58'; Sazal (yellow card) 73'	Report	Obidur 42'; Sajon (yellow card) 59'; Aboubacar (yellow card) 76'; Soma (yellow card) 82'	Stadium: Rajshahi District Stadium; Referee: Mahmud Jamal Faruquee Nahid

28 June 2022 17	Saif Sporting Club	1–2	Swadhinata KS	Munshigonj
15:30 BST (UTC+6)	Emeka 58'; Riyadul (yellow card) 72' (yellow-red card) 84'	Report	Zillur 67'; Ivan 85' (pen.); Sazal (yellow card) 90'	Stadium: Munshigonj District Stadium; Referee: Md Alamgir Sarker

4 July 2022 18	Bangladesh Police FC	1–0	Swadhinata KS	Rajshahi
15:30 BST (UTC+6)	Amiruddin 71' (pen.); Monaem (yellow card) 80'	Report	Murad (yellow card) 69'	Stadium: Rajshahi District Stadium; Referee: Md Alamgir Sarker

14 July 2022 19	Dhaka Abahani	4–1	Swadhinata KS	Comilla
16:00 BST (UTC+6)	Colindres 20'; Dorielton 24', 57'; Raphael 80'	Report	Shakil (yellow card) 34'; Suzuki 45+3'; Ekbal (yellow card) 77'	Stadium: Comilla District Stadium; Referee: Anwar Hossain Saju

21 July 2022 20	Swadhinata KS	1–5	Rahmatganj MFS	Rajshahi
16:00 BST (UTC+6)	Ivan 56' (pen.); Nasarul (yellow card) 88'	Report	Touré (yellow card) 17'; Philip 28'; Sunday 52', 68', 89' (pen.); Sanower 86'	Stadium: Rajshahi District Stadium; Referee: Bhubon Mohon Tarafder

26 July 2022 21	Sheikh Jamal DC	2–2	Swadhinata KS	Munshigonj
16:00 BST (UTC+6)	Otabek 70'; Alaekwe (yellow card) 23' (goal) 90+1'	Report	Ekbal 26'; Shakil (yellow card) 45'; Zillur 49'	Stadium: Munshigonj District Stadium; Referee: Bituraj Barua

2 August 2022 22	Swadhinata KS	1–4	Sheikh Russel KC	Rajshahi
16:00 BST (UTC+6)	Shamshud 51' (pen.)	Report	Richard 16' (yellow card) 53'; Brossou 21'; Akinade 36' (pen.); Manik 73'	Stadium: Rajshahi District Stadium; Referee: Sujit Das

== Statistics ==
=== Goalscorers ===
As of match played till 2 August 2022

Rank	Player	Position	Total	BPL	Independence Cup	Federation Cup
1	(Bosnia and Herzegovina) Nedo Turković	FW	6	4	1	1
2	(Poland) Rafał Zaborowski	MF	3	1	2	0
2	(Uzbekistan) Nodir Mavlonov	MF	3	2	1	0
2	(Bangladesh) Zillur Rahman	FW	3	3	0	0
3	(Bangladesh) Bishal Das	FW	2	2	0	0
3	(Bangladesh) Ekbal Hussain	MF	2	2	0	0
3	(Bangladesh) Rasel Ahmed	FW	2	2	0	0
3	(Serbia) Ivan Marić	MF	2	2	0	0
4	(Bangladesh) Jahedul Alam	FW	1	1	0	0
4	(Bangladesh) Sabbir Hossain	MF	1	1	0	0
4	(Bangladesh) Saif Shamsud	FW	1	1	0	0
4	(Japan) Yuta Suzuki	MF	1	1	0	0
Total			27	22	4	1

Source: Matches
