= 2021–22 Muktijoddha Sangsad KC season =

Muktijoddha Sangsad KC
2021–22 season
- President: Zahurul Islam Rhohel
- Head coach: Raja Isa
- Stadium: Sheikh Fazlul Haque Mani Stadium
- Bangladesh Premier League: 9 of 12
- Federation Cup: Did not play
- Independence Cup: Group stage
- Top goalscorer: League: Soma Otani; Tetsuaki Misawa; Sudi Abdallah (5 goals each); All: Tetsuaki Misawa (8 goals)
- Biggest win: 3–0 Sheikh Russel KC (12 March 2022)
- Biggest defeat: 1–7 Rahmatganj MFS (4 July 2022)
Home colours	Away colours	Third colours

The 2021–22 Muktijoddha Sangsad KC's season was the club's 38th competitive highest level season, since their promotion from the Dhaka Second Division League in 1982. This season also marks the club's 14th season in top-flight professional football since the introduction of the Bangladesh Premier League in 2007. The season was covered from 1 October 2021– 2 August 2022.

== Season summary ==
=== November ===
On 28 November Mutijoddha Sangsad KC started their new football season journey with losing by 1–2 against Dhaka Mohammedan. A goal was scored by Japanese forward Tetsuaki Misawa but it didn't help to win the match.

=== December ===
On 2 December Muktijoddha Sangsad KC met Saif Sporting Club and they were defeated 3–2. Early goals by Foysal Ahmed Fahim and Nasirul Islam gave lead to SSC before half time. In the second half Saif SC Sazzad Hossain gave the 3–0 lead. In the 85 & 90 minutes two goals by Japanese forward Tetsuaki Misawa of Muktijoddha Sangsad KC gave them hope but before the final whistle of the referee they didn't manage to win or draw.

On 6 December Muktijoddha Sangsad KC drew 1–1 against Bangladesh Army football Egypt, during the 8 minute Egyptian forward Ahmed Samsaldin scored and finished first half winning. In the second half during minute 87 a goal was scored by Bangladesh Army's Shamimul Haque tying the score.

On 26 December Muktijoddha Sanhsad KC lost 3–0 to Sheikh Jamal DC by FIFA Walkover laws. The match was scheduled to play but the club withdrew from the tournament.

On 28 December Muktijoddha Sanhsad KC lost 3–0 to Rahmatganj MFS by FIFA Walkover laws. The match was scheduled to play following date but the club withdrew from the tournament. As per FIFA Walkover laws the opposite club was declared winner of the match.

=== February ===
On 4 February Muktijoddha Sangsad KC met Dhaka Abahani in their away match and lost 0–1. In the first half, during minute 12, Brazilian forward Dorielton scored and took the lead; the first half finished 1–0. In the second half both teams played without a goal and Dhaka Abahani got three points. Muktijoddha Sangsad KC finished the season's first match with a result of 1–0.

On 8 February Muktijoddha Sangsad KC lost a home match by 0–3 against Muktijoddha Sangsad KC. In the first half during minute 20 a goal by Sheikh Jamal DC Solomon King Kanform scored 1–0 and on minute 35 a goal by Matthew Chinedu made score 2–0 before half time break. In the second half on minute 57, Matthew Chinedu scored 3–0. Muktijoddha Sangsad KC players weren't able to score any goal against Sheikh Jamal DC until the game ended. Sheikh Jamal DC won 3–0.

On 12 February Muktijoddha Sangsad KC lost by 0–1 against Bashundhara Kings in an away match. During the First half both team didn't manage to score and by half time the score was 0–0. In the second half on minutes 57 Brazilian forward Robson scored and Kings won 1–0. Muktijoddha SKC players tried to counterattack but it wasn't enough to equalize.

On 19 February Muktijoddha Sangsad KC lost 1–2 in a home match versus Uttar Baridhara Club. In the first half both teams didn't score a goal. In the second half on minutes 58 Arif Hossain Uttar Baridhara scored for Uttar and on minutes 64 a goal by Sujon Biswas made score 2–0 but on minute 88 Japanese Soma Otani scored for Muktijoddha Sangsad KC. Muktijoddha Sangsad KC lost 4 matches in a row at this point.

On 25 February Muktijoddha Sangsad KC defeated 2–1 Swadhinata KS at a home match. In the first half both teams didn't score a goal. In the second half on minute 54 Nedo Turković score for Swadhinata KS but on minute 88 Muktijoddha Sangsad KC equalize 1–1 because of an own goal by Hasan Murakami. After 2 minutes Japanese Tetsuaki Misawa scored and the final result was 2–1, Muktijoddha Sangsad KC took their first victory of Bangladesh Premier League football.

=== March ===
On 2 March Muktijoddha Sangsad KC lost 0–1 versus Bangladesh Police FC at a home match.

On 7 March Muktijoddha Sangsad KC lost 0–1 against Rahmatganj MFS at a home match.

On 12 March Muktijoddha Sangsad KC won against Sheikh Russel KC 3–0 in an away match.

On 18 March Muktijoddha Sangsad KC lost 1–2 Dhaka Mohammedan in the away match.

=== April ===
On 3 April Muktijoddha Sangsad KC lost 1–2 against Chittagong Abahani in an away game.

On 8 April Muktijoddha Sangsad KC drew against Saif Sporting Club 3–3 at a home match.

On 25 April Muktijoddha Sangsad KC lost to Dhaka Abahani 3–4 at a home match.

=== May ===
On 7 May Muktijoddha Sangsad KC lost against Bashundhara Kings 2–3 at a home match.

On 13 May Muktijoddha Sangsad KC drew against Uttar Baridhara Club 1–1 in an away match.

=== June ===
On 23 June Muktijoddha Sangsad KC won against Swadhinata KS 1–0 in an away match.

On 29 June Muktijoddha Sangsad KC Lost to Bangladesh Police FC by 1–4 at a home match.

=== July ===
On 4 July Muktijoddha Sangsad KC lost against Rahmatganj MFS 1–7 in an away match.

On 15 July, Muktijoddha Sangsad KC drew 0–0 at a home match against Sheikh Russel KC.

On 21 July Muktijoddha Sangsad KC won against Dhaka Mohammedan 2–1 at a home match.

On 27 July Muktijoddha Sangsad KC drew against Chittagong Abahani 1–1 at home.

On 31 July Muktijoddha Sangsad KC won against Saif Sporting Club 3–2 in the final away game.

== Squad ==
Muktijoddha Sangsad KC squad for the 2021–22 season.

As of April 2022

Note: Flags indicate national team as defined under FIFA eligibility rules; some limited exceptions apply. Players may hold more than one non-FIFA nationality.

No.	Pos.	Nation	Player
1	GK	BAN	Mamun Khan
2	DF	BAN	Khalil Bhuiya
3	DF	BAN	Tareq Miah
6	MF	BAN	Tariqul Islam
7	MF	BAN	Didarul Alam
8	MF	JPN	Soma Otani
9	FW	JPN	Tetsuaki Misawa (captain)
11	MF	BAN	Sohel Rana
12	DF	BAN	Sajon Mia
13	DF	BAN	Sumon Ahmed
14	MF	BAN	Salauddin Ruhel
15	FW	BAN	Sarower Zaman Nipu
16	DF	BAN	Istekharul Alam Shakil
17	MF	BAN	Mohiudeen Mahi
18	MF	BAN	Somriddha Nokrek
19	MF	BAN	Md Roman
20	MF	BAN	Nayeemuddin

No.	Pos.	Nation	Player
21	MF	BAN	Mohammad Abdullah Tofel
22	GK	BAN	Mohamed Razib
23	MF	BAN	Mohamed Elias
25	GK	BAN	Maksudur Rahman Mostak
26	DF	BAN	Mehedi Hasan Mithu (on loan from Bashundhara Kings)
27	MF	BAN	Obidur Rahman Nawbab (on loan from Bashundhara Kings)
28	MF	BAN	Shuvo Raj Bongshi
29	FW	BAN	Muhammad Iqbal
31	MF	BAN	Shakil Kishur
32	DF	BAN	Mahadud Hossain Fahim
33	DF	BAN	Rifath Hossain
36	GK	BAN	Limon Hosen
55	DF	BAN	Yeamin Munna
70	MF	BDI	Sudi Abdallah
77	MF	BAN	Rohit Sarkar
99	FW	BAN	Aminur Rahman Sajib
—	DF	BAN	Jayanto Lal (on loan from Bashundhara Kings)

== Pre-season friendly ==
18 November 2021	Muktijoddha Sangsad KC	1–0	Sheikh Jamal DC	Dhanmondi
14:00 UTC+6	Md Roman 19'	Report		Stadium: Dhanmondi Football Ground

23 November 2021	Muktijoddha Sangsad KC	1–3	Saif Sporting Club	Dhanmondi
14:00 UTC+6				Stadium: Dhanmondi Football Ground

10 January 2022	Muktijoddha Sangsad KC	1–0	Bangladesh Police FC	Dhaka
14:00 UTC+6	Samsaldin 67'			Stadium: Bangladesh Army Stadium

== Transfer ==
=== In ===
No.	Pos	Player	Previous club	Fee	Date	Source
15	DF	(Bangladesh) Yeamin Munna	(Bangladesh) Sheikh Russel KC	Free transfer	19 September 2021	
20	MF	(Bangladesh) Nayeem Uddin	(Bangladesh) Sheikh Russel KC	Free transfer	20 September 2021	
49	DF	(Bangladesh) Tareq Miah	(Bangladesh) Bashundhara Kings	Free transfer	20 September 2021	
21	DF	(Bangladesh) Shakil Ahmed	(Bangladesh) Sheikh Jamal DC	Free transfer	20 September 2021	
18	DF	(Bangladesh) Habibur Rahman Nolok	(Bangladesh) Sheikh Russel KC	Free transfer	20 September 2021	
10	MF	(Egypt) Ahmed Shamsaldin	(Iraq) Newroz SC	Free transfer	21 November 2021	
7	FW	(Japan) Tetsuaki Misawa	(Mongolia) BCH Lions	Free transfer	23 November 2021	
11	MF	(Japan) Soma Otani	(Laos) F.C. Chanthabouly	Free transfer	24 November 2021	
14	FW	(Burundi) Sudi Abdallah	(Rwanda) AS Kigali	Not disclosed	17 April 2022	
–	DF	(Guinea) Aboubacar Bakia Camara	(India) BSS Sporting Club	Not disclosed	22 April 2022	

=== Out ===
No.	Pos	Player	Transferred To	Fee	Date	Source
26	DF	(Bangladesh) Mehedi Hasan Mithu	(Bangladesh) Bashundhara Kings	Not disclosed	18 September 2021	
4	DF	(Bangladesh) Habibur Rahman Nolok	(Bangladesh) Chittagong Abahani	Not disclosed	22 April 2022	

=== Loans in ===
No.	Pos	Player	Loaned from	Fee	Date	On loan until	Source
26	DF	(Bangladesh) Mehedi Hasan Mithu	(Bangladesh) Bashundhara Kings	Not disclosed	20 April 2022	End of season	
77	FW	(Bangladesh) Obidur Rahman Nawbab	(Bangladesh) Bashundhara Kings	Not disclosed	20 April 2022	End of season	
88	DF	(Bangladesh) Jayanto Lal	(Bangladesh) Bashundhara Kings	Not disclosed	20 April 2022	End of season	

== Competitions ==
Win Draw Loss Fixtures

=== Overall ===
Competition	First match	Last match	Final Position
Independence Cup	28 November 2021	6 December 2021	Group stage
Federation Cup	Did not play		None
BPL	3 February 2022	1 August 2022	11 of 12

=== Overview ===
Competition	Record							
Competition	Pld	W	D	L	GF	GA	GD	Win %
Independence Cup	3	0	1	2	4	6	−2	0.00
Federation Cup	2	0	0	2	0	6	−6	0.00
BPL	22	5	4	13	27	42	−15	22.73
Total	27	5	5	17	31	54	−23	18.52

Source: Competitions

=== Independence Cup ===
==== Group C ====
Pos	Team	Pld	W	D	L	GF	GA	GD	Pts	Status
1	Saif Sporting Club	3	2	1	0	6	4	+2	7	Qualified for Knockout stage
2	Bangladesh Army	3	1	1	1	4	4	0	4	Qualified for Knockout stage
3	Dhaka Mohammedan	3	1	1	1	4	4	0	4	
4	Muktijoddha Sangsad KC	3	0	1	2	4	6	−2	1	

Source: Global Sports Archive
Rules for classification: Group stage tiebreakers

28 November 2021	Mohammedan SC	2–1	Muktijoddha Sangsad KC	Dhaka
16:00 BST (UTC+6)	Diabate 36'; Sahed 50'	Report	Tetsuaki 70'	Stadium: BSSS Mostafa Kamal Stadium

2 December 2021	Muktijoddha Sangsad KC	2–3	Saif Sporting Club	Dhaka
16:00 BST (UTC+6)	Tetsuaki 85', 90'	Report	Fahim 17'; Nasirul 40'; Sazzad 81'	Stadium: BSSS Mostafa Kamal Stadium; Referee: Md Mizanur Rahman

6 December 2021	Muktijoddha Sangsad KC	1–1	Bangladesh Army	Dhaka
16:00 BST (UTC+6)	Shamsaldin 8'	Report	Shamimul 87'	Stadium: BSSS Mostafa Kamal Stadium; Referee: Md Mizanur Rahman

=== Federation Cup ===
==== Group D ====
Pos	Team	Pld	W	D	L	GF	GA	GD	Pts	Status
1	Sheikh Jamal DC	2	1	1	0	4	1	+3	4 (Note: As the fair play points of the two teams were equal, the group champion and runners-up were determined through a penalty shootout. Sheikh Jamal DC (5–4) Rahmatganj MFS.)	Advance to Knockout stage
2	Rahmatganj MFS	2	1	1	0	4	1	+3	4	Advance to Knockout stage
3	Muktijoddha Sangsad KS	2	0	0	2	0	6	−6	0	Later withdrew

Source: Soccerway
Rules for classification: Group stage tiebreakers
Notes:

26 December 2022	Muktijoddha Sangsad KC	0–3; Walkover	Sheikh Jamal DC	Dhaka
18:45 BST (UTC+6)		Report		Stadium: BSSS Mostafa Kamal Stadium; Referee: Bhubon Mohon Torafder
Note: Sheikh Jamal DC were awarded walkover win by 3 goals since Muktijoddha Sangsad KC didn't turn up for the match

28 December 2022	Muktijoddha Sangsad KC	0–3; Walkover	Rahmatganj MFS	Dhaka
18:45 BST (UTC+6)		Report		Stadium: BSSS Mostafa Kamal Stadium
Note: Rahmatganj MFS were awarded walkover win by 3 goals since Muktijoddha Sangsad KC didn't turn up for the match

=== Premier League ===
==== League table ====
Pos	Team	Pld	W	D	L	GF	GA	GD	Pts	Qualification or relegation
7	Chittagong Abahani	22	8	7	7	39	42	−3	31	
8	Bangladesh Police FC	22	8	6	8	28	32	−4	30	
9	Muktijoddha Sangsad KC	22	5	4	13	27	42	−15	19	
10	Rahmatganj MFS	22	4	6	12	33	46	−13	18	
11	Uttar Baridhara Club (R)	22	3	5	14	24	58	−34	14	Relegation to Bangladesh Championship League

Source: Soccerway
Rules for classification: 1) Points; 2) Goal difference; 3) Goals scored.
(R) Relegated

==== Results summary ====
Overall								Home						Away					
Pld	W	D	L	GF	GA	GD	Pts	W	D	L	GF	GA	GD	W	D	L	GF	GA	GD
22	5	4	13	27	42	−15	19	2	3	6	15	23	−8	3	1	7	12	19	−7

Source: Soccerway

==== Results by round ====
Round	1	2	3	4	5	6	7	8	9	10	11	12	13	14	15	16	17	18	19	20	21	22
Ground	A	H	A	H	H	A	H	A	A	A	H	H	A	H	A	A	H	A	H	H	H	A
Result	L	L	L	L	W	L	L	W	L	L	D	L	L	L	D	W	L	L	D	W	D	W
Position	12	12	11	12	11	12	12	10	10	11	11	11	11	11	11	10	10	11	11	10	10	9

Source: Matches
A = Away; H = Home; W = Win; D = Draw; L = Loss; P = Postponed

=== Matches ===
3 February 2022 1	Dhaka Abahani	1–0	Muktijoddha Sangsad KC	Gazipur
15:00 BST (UTC+6)	Dorielton 12'	Report	I. Shakil (yellow card) 79'	Stadium: Shaheed Ahsan Ullah Master Stadium; Referee: Md Anisur Rahman

8 February 2022 2	Muktijoddha Sangsad KC	0–3	Sheikh Jamal DC	Gazipur
15:00 BST (UTC+6)	I. Shakil (yellow card) 57'; M. Nipu (yellow card) 63'	Report	S. Kanform 20'; O. Babu (yellow card) 29'; M. Chinedu 37', 55'	Stadium: Shaheed Ahsan Ullah Master Stadium; Referee: Md Alamgir Sarker

12 February 2022 3	Bashundhara Kings	1–0	Muktijoddha Sangsad KC	Gazipur
15:00 BST (UTC+6)	Robinho 58'	Report	Habibur (yellow card) 61'	Stadium: Shaheed Ahsan Ullah Master Stadium; Referee: Bhubon Mohon Tarafder

19 February 2022 4	Muktijoddha Sangsad KC	1–2	Uttar Baridhara Club	Gopalganj
15:00 BST (UTC+6)	Otani 87'	Report	Arif 58'; Sujon 64'; Saiful (yellow card) 82'	Stadium: Sheikh Fazlul Haque Mani Stadium; Referee: Sohrab Hossain

25 February 2022 5	Muktijoddha Sangsad KC	2–1	Swadhinata KS	Gopalganj
15:00 BST (UTC+6)	Murad 81' (o.g.); Tetsuaki 83'; Sujon (yellow card) 84'	Report	Mavlonov (yellow card) 53'; Turković 54'	Stadium: Sheikh Fazlul Haque Mani Stadium; Referee: Md Anisur Rahman

2 March 2022 6	Bangladesh Police FC	1–0	Muktijoddha Sangsad KC	Rajshahi
15:00 BST (UTC+6)	Kouskous 44'	Report	Mahi (yellow card) 90+2'	Stadium: Rajshahi District Stadium; Referee: Golam Mourshed Chowdhury Nayon

7 March 2022 7	Muktijoddha Sangsad KC	0–1	Rahmatganj MFS	Gopalganj
15:00 BST (UTC+6)	Roman (yellow card) 30'	Report	Camara 57' (o.g.)	Stadium: Sheikh Fazlul Haque Mani Stadium; Referee: Md Anisur Rahman

12 March 2022 8	Sheikh Russel KC	0–3	Muktijoddha Sangsad KC	Dhaka
15:30 BST (UTC+6)	Esmaël (yellow card) 44'; Amaral (yellow card) 84'; Dukhu Mia (yellow card) 84'		Soma 22'; Didarul 54' (yellow card) 84'; Sajon (yellow card) 67'; Aminur 81'; Tareq (yellow card) 84'	Stadium: Bashundhara Kings Arena; Referee: Mohmmamed Jalaluddin

18 March 2022 9	Dhaka Mohammedan	2–1	Muktijoddha Sangsad KC	Comilla
15:30 BST (UTC+6)	Sahed 13'; Shamsud 17'; Emon (yellow card) 53'; Asif (yellow card) 55'; Jafar (yellow card) 63'; Jasmin (yellow card) 71'	Report	Camara (yellow card) 9'; Aminur 62'	Stadium: Comilla Stadium; Referee: Anisur Rahman

3 April 2022 10	Chittagong Abahani	2–1	Muktijoddha Sangsad KC	Cumilla
15:30 BST (UTC+6)	Peter; 27': Shohel (yellow card) 56' (goal) 66'		Otani 45'; Sajon (yellow card) 52'; Sajib (yellow card) 79'; Tareq (yellow card) 90+3'	Stadium: Comilla Stadium; Referee: Golam Mourshed Chowdhury Nayan

8 April 2022 11	Muktijoddha Sangsad KC	3–3	Saif Sporting Club	Gopalganj
15:30 BST (UTC+6)	Tetsuaki 9'; Didarul 27'; Aminur 35'	Report	Sazzad 21'; Rafi 31'; Gafurov (yellow card) 51'; Udoh 63'	Stadium: Sheikh Fazlul Haque Mani Stadium; Referee: Anisur Rahman

25 April 2022 12	Muktijoddha Sangsad KC	3–4	Dhaka Abahani	Gopalganj
15:30 BST (UTC+6)	Misawa 34' (pen.), 90+5' (pen.); Otani 50'	Report	Soleimani (yellow card) 34'; Shaeid (yellow card) 44'; Colindres 65'; Rakib 66', 80'; Raphael 75'	Stadium: Sheikh Fazlul Haque Mani Stadium; Referee: Mohammed Jalaluddin

29 April 2022 13	Sheikh Jamal DC	2–1	Muktijoddha Sangsad KC	Munshigonj
15:30 BST (UTC+6)	Najare 28'; Kanform 66'; Valizonov (yellow card) 74'	Report	Camara 70'; Tareq (yellow card) 70'; Fahim (yellow card) 90+5'	Stadium: Munshigonj District Stadium; Referee: Mizanur Rahman

7 May 2022 14	Muktijoddha Sangsad KC	2–3	Bashundhara Kings	Munshigonj
15:45 BST (UTC+6)	Abdallah 17', 60'	Report	Marong (yellow card) 22'; Robinho 48'; Rimon (yellow card) 61'; Kingsley 73'; Sumon 80'	Stadium: Munshigonj District Stadium; Referee: Mohammad Jalaluddin

13 May 2022 15	Uttar Baridhara Club	1–1	Muktijoddha Sangsad KC	Gopalganj
15:30 BST (UTC+6)	Papon (yellow card) 45+1'; Arif (yellow card) 46'; Youssouf 68'; Fozlilov (yellow card) 85'	Report	Soma 27'; Tariqul (yellow card) 49'	Stadium: Sheikh Fazlul Haque Mani Stadium; Referee: Bituraj Barua

23 June 2022 16	Swadhinata KS	0–1	Muktijoddha Sangsad KC	Rajshahi
15:30 BST (UTC+6)	Abu Bokor (yellow card) 58'; Sazal (yellow card) 73'	Report	Obidur 42'; Sajon (yellow card) 59'; Aboubacar (yellow card) 76'; Soma (yellow card) 82'	Stadium: Rajshahi District Stadium; Referee: Mahmud Jamal Faruquee Nahid

29 June 2022 17	Muktijoddha Sangsad KC	1–4	Bangladesh Police FC	Gopalganj
15:30 BST (UTC+6)	Didarul (yellow card) 27'; Aboubacar (yellow card) 56'; Abdallah 18'	Report	Kouakou 3', 26'; Bablu 44', 90+1'	Stadium: Sheikh Fazlul Haque Mani Stadium; Referee: Mohammed Nasiruddin

4 July 2022 18	Rahmatganj MFS	7–1	Muktijoddha Sangsad KC	Munshigonj
15:30 BST (UTC+6)	Philip 25', 89' (pen.), 90+3'; Sunday 37'; Touré (yellow card) 45+4'; Mehebub (yellow card) 51'; Al Amin 69'; Touré 80'; Ashraful 86'	Report	Obidur 45+2'	Stadium: Munshigonj District Stadium; Referee: Mohammed Jalaluddin

15 July 2022 19	Muktijoddha Sangsad KC	0–0	Sheikh Russel KC	Gopalganj
16:00 BST (UTC+6)		Report	Hemanta (yellow card) 45+3'	Stadium: Sheikh Fazlul Haque Mani Stadium; Referee: Anwar Hossain Saju

21 July 2022 20	Muktijoddha Sangsad KC	2–1	Dhaka Mohammedan	Gopalganj
16:00 BST (UTC+6)	Abdallah 26', 69'	Report	Jasmin (yellow card) 72'; Moneke 90'	Stadium: Sheikh Fazlul Haque Mani Stadium; Referee: Bituraj Barua

27 July 2022 21	Muktijoddha Sangsad KC	1–1	Chittagong Abahani	Gopalganj
16:00 BST (UTC+6)	Tariqul 2'; A. Camara (yellow card) 44'; Tareq (yellow card) 90+2'	Report	Candy 39'; Koushik (yellow card) 85'	Stadium: Sheikh Fazlul Haque Mani Stadium; Referee: Shorab Hossain

31 July 2022 22	Saif Sporting Club	2–3	Muktijoddha Sangsad KC	Munshigonj
16:00 BST (UTC+6)	Emery (yellow card) 6' (yellow-red card) 9'; Mfon 73'; Sajon 86' (o.g.) (yellow card) 90+7'	Report	Misawa 45'; Abdallah 46' (yellow card) 47'; Obidur 49'; Khalil (yellow card) 73'; Razib (yellow card) 89'	Stadium: Munshigonj District Stadium; Referee: Golam Murshed Chowdhury Nayon

== Statistics ==
=== Goalscorers ===
As of match played till 31 July 2022

Rank	Player	Position	Total	BPL	Independence Cup	Federation Cup
1	(Japan) Tetsuaki Misawa	FW	8	5	3	0
2	(Burundi) Sudi Abdallah	FW	6	6	0	0
3	(Japan) Soma Otani	MF	5	5	0	0
3	(Bangladesh) Obidur Rahman Nawbab	MF	3	3	0	0
3	(Bangladesh) Aminur Rahman Sajib	FW	3	3	0	0
4	(Bangladesh) Didarul Alam	MF	2	2	0	0
5	(Bangladesh) Tariqul Islam	MF	1	1	0	0
5	(Egypt) Ahmed Samsaldin	FW	1	0	1	0
5	(Guinea) Aboubacar Bakia Camara	DF	1	1	0	0
Own goal			1	1	0	0
Total			31	27	4	0

Source: Matches
