= 2022–23 Sheikh Jamal Dhanmondi Club season =

Sheikh Jamal DC
2022–23 season
- Owner: Bashundhara Group
- President: Safwan Sobhan Tasvir
- Head coach: (Bangladesh) Maruful Haque
- Stadium: Sheikh Fazlul Haque Mani Stadium
- Bangladesh Premier League: 6th of 11
- Federation Cup: Quarter-finals
- Independence Cup: Quarter-finals
- Top goalscorer: League: (Saint Vincent and the Grenadines) Cornelius Stewart (10 goals); All: (Saint Vincent and the Grenadines) Cornelius Stewart (16 goals)
- Biggest win: 3–0 Vs BFF Elite Academy (16 November 2022); 3–0 Vs AFC Uttara (20 December 2022 )
- Biggest defeat: 0–3 Vs Bashundhara Kings (11 February 2023); 0–3 Vs Dhaka Abahani (2 June 2023); 0–3 Vs Fortis FC (22 July 2023)
Home colours	Away colours

The 2022–23 season was Sheikh Jamal Dhanmondi Club's 61st season since its establishment in 1962 and its 12th competitive season in the Bangladesh Premier League. In addition to the domestic league, the club participated in the Federation Cup and Independence Cup. The season covered the period from 8 October 2022 to 22 July 2023.

== Current squad ==
As of 29 November 2022

Sheikh Jamal DC Squad for 2022–23 season.

Note: Flags indicate national team as defined under FIFA eligibility rules; some limited exceptions apply. Players may hold more than one non-FIFA nationality.

No.	Pos.	Nation	Player
1	GK	BAN	Russel Mahmud Liton
2	DF	BAN	Raihan Hasan
4	DF	BAN	Yeamin Ahmed Chowdhury Munna
5	DF	BAN	Tareq Miah
6	DF	PAR	Jorge Aguilar
7	FW	BAN	Mohammad Jewel
8	MF	UZB	Otabek Valizhonov
9	FW	VIN	Cornelius Stewart
10	FW	BAN	Obidur Rahman Nawbab
11	FW	GAM	Sulayman Sillah
12	MF	BAN	Kawshik Barua
13	MF	BAN	Abu Shaeid
14	FW	BAN	Mannaf Rabby
15	DF	BAN	Shakil Hossain
16	DF	BAN	Shafiqul Islam Bipul
17	MF	BAN	Faysal Ahmed
18	MF	BAN	Omar Faruk Babu
19	MF	BAN	Sohanur Rahman
20	FW	BAN	Nurul Absar
21	DF	BAN	Shakil Ahmed
22	GK	BAN	Samiul Islam Masum
23	GK	BAN	Ishaque Ali
24	DF	BAN	Rofiqur Rahman Mamun
25	DF	BAN	Md Khalil Bhuyian
27	DF	BAN	Rashedul Alam Moni
29	DF	BAN	Nasirul Islam Nasir
30	GK	BAN	Mohammed Nayeem
31	DF	BAN	Rifat Hasan Sarthok
32	DF	BAN	Mohammad Emon
33	FW	BAN	Mehedi Hasan Hridoy
67	FW	BAN	Piash Ahmed Nova (on loan from Bashundhara Kings)
70	MF	UZB	Nodir Mavlonov

== Transfer ==
=== In ===
No.	Pos	Player	Previous club	Fee	Date	Source
25	DF	(Bangladesh) Md Khalil Bhuyian	(Bangladesh) Muktijoddha Sangsad KC	Free transfer	4 September 2022	
4	DF	(Bangladesh) Yeamin Ahmed Chowdhury Munna	(Bangladesh) Muktijoddha Sangsad KC	Free transfer	4 September 2022	
5	DF	(Bangladesh) Tareq Miah	(Bangladesh) Muktijoddha Sangsad KC	Free transfer	6 September 2022	
11	FW	(The Gambia) Suleiman Sillah	Unattached	Free transfer	8 October 2022	
10	DF	(Bangladesh) Obidur Rahman Nawbab	(Bangladesh) Bashundhara Kings	Free transfer	9 October 2022	
7	FW	(Bangladesh) Mohammad Jewel	(Bangladesh) Sheikh Russel KC	Free transfer	15 October 2022	
13	MF	(Bangladesh) Abu Shaeid	(Bangladesh) Abahani Limited Dhaka	Free transfer	15 October 2022	
70	MF	(Uzbekistan) Nodir Mavlonov	Unattached	Free transfer	19 October 2022	
32	DF	(Bangladesh) Mohammad Emon	(Bangladesh) Sheikh Russel KC	Free transfer	21 October 2022	
6	FW	(Paraguay) Jorge Aguilar	(Paraguay) Sol de América	Free transfer	27 October 2022	
27	DF	(Bangladesh) Rashedul Alam Moni	Bangladesh Police FC	Free transfer	7 November 2022	
29	DF	(Bangladesh) Nasirul Islam Nasir	(Bangladesh) Saif Sporting Club	Free transfer	7 November 2022	
14	MF	(Bangladesh) Mannaf Rabby	(Bangladesh) Sheikh Russel KC	Free transfer	7 November 2022	
1	GK	(Bangladesh) Russel Mahmud Liton	(Bangladesh) Sheikh Russel KC	Free transfer	7 November 2022	
12	MF	(Bangladesh) Kawshik Barua	(Bangladesh) Chittagong Abahani Limited	Free transfer	7 November 2022	
15	DF	(Bangladesh) Shakil Hossain	(Bangladesh) Swadhinata KS	Free transfer	7 November 2022	
9	FW	(Saint Vincent and the Grenadines) Cornelius Stewart	(Maldives) Maziya S&RC	Free transfer	7 November 2022	
–	FW	(England) Nabil Rahim	(Bangladesh) Dhaka Mohammedan	Free transfer	14 March 2023	

=== Out ===
No.	Pos	Player	Moved to	Fee	Date	Source
6	DF	(Bangladesh) Mojammel Hossain Nira	(Bangladesh) Fortis FC	Free transfer	7 August 2022	
1	GK	(Bangladesh) Mitul Marma	(Bangladesh) Fortis FC	Free transfer	7 August 2022	
29	DF	(Bangladesh) Shahin Mia	(Bangladesh) Fortis FC	Free transfer	10 August 2022	
3	DF	(Bangladesh) Ariful Islam Jitu	(Bangladesh) Fortis FC	Free transfer	22 August 2022	
5	DF	(Bangladesh) Mohamed Atikuzzaman	(Bangladesh) Bashundhara Kings	Free transfer	8 October 2022	
10	DF	(The Gambia) Solomon King Kanform	Unattached	Released	18 October 2022	
28	DF	(Bangladesh) Arman Sadi	(Bangladesh) AFC Uttara	Free transfer	18 October 2022	
4	DF	(Bangladesh) Yeasin Khan	(Bangladesh) Sheikh Russel KC	Free transfer	26 October 2022	
15	DF	(Bangladesh) Mohammad Sagor Miah	(Bangladesh) AFC Uttara	Free transfer	7 November 2022	
13	MF	(Bangladesh) Mazharul Islam Sourav	(Bangladesh) Fortis FC	Free transfer	7 November 2022	
37	FW	(Nigeria) Chijoke Alaekwe	Unattached	Released	7 November 2022	
36	FW	(Nigeria) Musa Najare	Unattached	Released	7 November 2022	
19	FW	(Bangladesh) Rashedul Islam Shuvo	Unattached	Released	7 November 2022	
12	FW	(Bangladesh) Jabed Khan	Unattached	Released	7 November 2022	
26	MF	(Bangladesh) Ali Hossain	Unattached	Released	7 November 2022	
32	MF	(Bangladesh) Tawhid Hasan	Unattached	Released	7 November 2022	
16	DF	(Bangladesh) Mohamed Sohel Rana	Unattached	Released	7 November 2022	
27	DF	(Bangladesh) Shamol Miah	Unattached	Released	7 November 2022	
23	GK	(Bangladesh) Miraj Hawlader	Unattached	Released	7 November 2022	

=== Loans in ===
No.	Pos	Player	Loaned from	Fee	Date	On loan until	Source
67	FW	(Bangladesh) Piash Ahmed Nova	(Bangladesh) Bashundhara Kings	Not disclosed	24 October 2022	End of season	

== Competitions ==
Win Draw Loss Fixtures

=== Overall ===
Competition	First match	Last match	Final Position
BPL	9 December 2022	22 July 2023	6th
Federation Cup	20 December 2022	11 April 2023	Quarter-finals
Independence Cup	16 November 2022	27 November 2022	Quarter-finals

=== Overview ===
Competition	Record							
Competition	Pld	W	D	L	GF	GA	GD	Win %
BPL	20	5	9	6	25	33	−8	25.00
Independence Cup	4	1	1	2	9	8	+1	25.00
Federation Cup	4	1	1	2	5	6	−1	25.00
Total	28	7	11	10	39	47	−8	25.00

Source: Competitions

=== Premier League ===
==== League table ====
Pos	Team	Pld	W	D	L	GF	GA	GD	Pts
4	Mohammedan SC	20	9	5	6	38	21	+17	32
5	Sheikh Russel KC	20	8	6	6	33	30	+3	30
6	Sheikh Jamal DC	20	5	9	6	25	32	−7	24
7	Fortis FC	20	5	8	7	23	25	−2	23
8	Chittagong Abahani	20	4	9	7	26	35	−9	21

Source: Soccerway
Rules for classification: 1) Points; 2) Goal difference; 3) Goals scored.

==== Results summary ====
Overall								Home						Away					
Pld	W	D	L	GF	GA	GD	Pts	W	D	L	GF	GA	GD	W	D	L	GF	GA	GD
20	5	9	6	25	32	−7	24	2	4	3	14	18	−4	3	5	3	11	14	−3

Source: Soccerway

==== Results by round ====
Round	1	2	3	4	5	6	7	8	9	10	11	12	13	14	15	16	17	18	19	20	21	22
Ground	H	A	H	A	H	A	(Note: No Sheikh Jamal DC matchday in this round.)	H	A	H	A	A	H	A	H	A	H	(Note: No Sheikh Jamal DC matchday in this round.)	A	H	A	H
Result	D	W	W	D	W	D	–	L	L	D	D	D	D	W	D	D	L	–	L	L	W	L
Position	3	2	2	2	3	3	3	4	5	5	5	6	6	4	4	4	5	6	6	6	6	6

Source: Matches
A = Away; H = Home; W = Win; D = Draw; L = Loss; P = Postponed

=== Matches ===
9 December 2022 1	Sheikh Jamal DC	2–2	Rahmatganj MFS	Gopalganj
14:30 BST (UTC+6)	Kawshik Barua 16'; Nodir Mavlonov (yellow card) 46'; Otabek Valizhonov 54' (yellow card) 76'	Report	Saddam Hossain Anny (yellow card) 6'; Noyon Mia (yellow card) 25'; Michael 54'; Mohamed Iftekhar Munna 63'	Stadium: Sheikh Fazlul Haque Mani Stadium; Referee: Bhubon Mohon Tarafder

23 December 2023 2	Muktijoddha Sangsad KC	2–3	Sheikh Jamal DC	Gopalganj
14:30 BST (UTC+6)	Adeyinka Najeem 44'; Soma Otani 90+4'	Report	Stewart 32', 90+3'; Kawshik Barua 64'; Otabek Valizhonov (yellow card) 87'	Stadium: Sheikh Fazlul Haque Mani Stadium; Referee: Golam Mourshed Chowdhury Nayan

30 December 2022 3	Sheikh Jamal DC	1–0	Bangladesh Police FC	Gopalganj
14:30 BST (UTC+6)	Stewart 24' (pen.); Kawshik Barua (yellow card) 53'	Report	Monaem (yellow card) 33'	Stadium: Sheikh Fazlul Haque Mani Stadium; Referee: Bhubon Mohon Tarafder

6 January 2023 4	Chittagong Abahani	1–1	Sheikh Jamal DC	Munshigonj
14:45 BST (UTC+6)	Ifeagwu Ojukwu David 53'; Mohammad Kamrul Islam (yellow card) 60'; Augustine (yellow card) 73'; Pulatov (yellow card) 73'; Nasiruddin (yellow card) 85'	Report	Otabek Valizhonov (yellow card) 70'; Stewart 76' (pen.)	Stadium: Shaheed Bir Sreshtho Flight Lt. Matiur Rahman Stadium; Referee: Anisur Rahman

14 January 2023 5	Sheikh Jamal DC	3–2	Sheikh Russel KC	Gopalganj
14:45 BST (UTC+6)	Mannaf Rabbi (yellow card) 28' (goal) 49'; Stewart 34' (pen.); Nodir Mavlonov (yellow card) 60' (goal) 74'; Sohanur Rahman (yellow card) 90+2'	Report	Yeasin (yellow card) 34'; Timur Talipov (yellow card) 55' (goal) 70'; Mfon 75'	Stadium: Sheikh Fazlul Haque Mani Stadium; Referee: Alamgir Sarker

20 January 2023 6	Dhaka Mohammedan	1–1	Sheikh Jamal DC	Comilla
15:00 BST (UTC+6)	Muzaffar Muzaffarov 29'	Report	Raihan (yellow card) 5'; Stewart 68'; Omar (yellow card) 73'	Stadium: Shaheed Dhirendranath Datta Stadium; Referee: Bituraj Barua

4 February 2023 8	Sheikh Jamal DC	1–2	Dhaka Abahani	Gopalganj
15:45 BST (UTC+6)	Otabek Valizonov (yellow card) 29'; Stewart 70' (pen.)	Report	Nworah 10'; Mehedi (yellow card) 28'; Colindres 34' (yellow card) 90+3'; Rahmat (yellow card) 53'; Rezaul (yellow card) 69'	Stadium: Sheikh Fazlul Haque Mani Stadium; Referee: Bitura Barua

11 February 2023 9	Bashundhara Kings	3–0	Sheikh Jamal DC	Dhaka
15:45 BST (UTC+6)	Asror Gafurov 37'; Dorielton 60', 74'; Rimon (yellow card) 61'	Report	Sohanur Rahman (yellow card) 52'; Otabek Valizhonov (yellow card) 58'	Stadium: Bashundhara Kings Arena; Referee: Md Anisur Rahman Sagor

17 February 2023 10	Sheikh Jamal DC	3–3	AFC Uttara	Gopalganj
15:45 BST (UTC+6)	Obidur 13'; Stewart 62' (pen.), 79'; Abu Shaied (yellow card) 69'; Otabek Valizhonov (yellow card) 88'	Report	Sarower Zaman Nipu 34'; Sultanbek Momunov 43'; Jintu Mia (yellow card) 78'; Rohit Sarkar 59' (yellow card) 66'; Salauddin Ruhel (yellow card) 78'; Mohamed Razib (yellow card) 78'	Stadium: Sheikh Fazlul Haque Mani Stadium; Referee: Sabuj Das

24 February 2023 11	Fortis FC	1–1	Sheikh Jamal DC	Rajshahi
15:45 BST (UTC+6)	Sharifi (red card) 19'; Sahin Ahammad 23'; Mazharul Islam Sourav (yellow card) 45'; Shahidul Islam Sumon (yellow card) 65'; Mitul (yellow card) 73'; Danilo (yellow card) 90'	Report	Sulayman Sillah (yellow card) 24'; Nodir Mavlonov (yellow card) 65' (goal) 90+1'	Stadium: Muktijuddho Sriti Stadium; Referee: Bhubon Mohon Tarafder

7 April 2023 12	Rahmatganj MFS	0–0	Sheikh Jamal DC	Munshigonj
15:45 BST (UTC+6)	Bunyod Shodiev (yellow card) 8'	Report	Mohammed Nurul Absar (yellow card) 33'	Stadium: Shaheed Bir Sreshtho Flight Lt. Matiur Rahman Stadium; Referee: Bituraj Barua

14 April 2023 13	Sheikh Jamal DC	1–1	Muktijoddha Sangsad KC	Gopalganj
15:45 BST (UTC+6)	Obidur (yellow card) 7'; Nodir Mavlonov (yellow card) 21'; Otabek Valizhonov 41'; Raihan (yellow card) 90'	Report	Uzochukwu 90+6' (pen.)	Stadium: Sheikh Fazlul Haque Mani Stadium; Referee: Bituraj Barua

28 April 2023 14	Bangladesh Police FC	1–2	Sheikh Jamal DC	Comilla
15:45 BST (UTC+6)	Johan (yellow card) 66' (yellow-red card) 68'; Mateo Palacios (yellow card) 66'; MS Bablu 82'	Report	Rashedul Islam Moni (yellow card) 2'; Abu Shaeid (yellow card) 25'; Sulyaman Sillah 56'; Otabek Valizhonov (yellow card) 66' (goal) 90+3'; Aguilar (red card) 66'; Stewart (yellow card) 83'; Mohammed Nayeem (yellow card) 90+7'	Stadium: Rafiq Uddin Bhuiyan Stadium; Referee: Saymoon Hasan Sany

5 May 2023 15	Sheikh Jamal DC	2–2	Chittagong Abahani	Gopalganj
16:00 BST (UTC+6)	Abu Shaeid (yellow card) 15'; Sulyaman Sillah 51' (yellow card) 90+2'; Nodir Mavlonov (yellow card) 55' (yellow-red card) 80'; Stewart 90+5'	Report	Nasir (yellow card) 18'; Mohamed Tarek (yellow card) 55'; Kahraba 50'; Ekbal Hussain 84'	Stadium: Sheikh Fazlul Haque Mani Stadium; Referee: Md Jalal Uddin

12 May 2023 16	Sheikh Russel KC	0–0	Sheikh Jamal DC	Dhaka
16:00 BST (UTC+6)	Abid Ahmed (yellow card) 54'	Report	Shakil (yellow card) 4'; Shakil Hossain (yellow card) 5'; Omar (yellow card) 51'; Sulayman Sillah (yellow card) 80'	Stadium: Bashundhara Kings Arena; Referee: Md Mizanur Rahman

19 May 2023 17	Sheikh Jamal DC	0–1	Dhaka Mohammedan	Gopalganj
16:00 BST (UTC+6)		Report	Sazzad 52'	Stadium: Sheikh Fazlul Haque Mani Stadium; Referee: Bituraj Barua

2 June 2023 19	Dhaka Abahani	3–0	Sheikh Jamal DC	Comilla
16:00 BST (UTC+6)	Eleta 23'; Emeka 45+4'; Colindres 48'; Shahidul (yellow card) 63'; Mehedi (yellow card) 87'	Report		Stadium: Shaheed Dhirendranath Datta Stadium; Referee: Bituraj Barua

7 July 2023 20	Sheikh Jamal DC	1–3	Bashundhara Kings	Gopalganj
16:00 BST (UTC+6)	Abu Shaeid 90'	Report	Figueira 4'; Dorielton 42'; Topu (yellow card) 45+2'; Md Sabbir Hossen (yellow card) 53'; Morsalin (yellow card) 72'; Robinho 77' (pen.)	Stadium: Sheikh Fazlul Haque Mani Stadium; Referee: Md Nasiruddin

14 July 2023 21	AFC Uttara	1–3	Sheikh Jamal DC	Mymensingh
16:00 BST (UTC+6)	Naim Uddin Noyon 69'; Rohit Sarkar (yellow card) 74'	Report	Stewart 59'; Mannaf Rabby 63'; Nodir Mavlynaov (yellow card) 56' (goal) 86'	Stadium: Rafiq Uddin Bhuiyan Stadium; Referee: Jashim Akhter

22 July 2023 22	Sheikh Jamal DC	0–3	Fortis FC	Gopalganj
16:00 BST (UTC+6)	Shakil Ahmed (yellow card) 90+6'	Report	Borhan Uddin (yellow card) 35'; Shahin Ahmed (yellow card) 39'; Sharifi 68'; Mohammaf Jahedul Alam 72' (yellow card) 73'; Joynal Abedin Dipu 90+2'	Stadium: Sheikh Fazlul Haque Mani Stadium; Referee: Taposh Roy

=== Federation Cup ===
==== Group stages ====
Pos	Team	Pld	W	D	L	GF	GA	GD	Pts	Qualification
1	Mohammedan SC	3	2	1	0	10	2	+8	7	Advance to knockout phase
2	Rahmatganj MFS	3	2	0	1	5	2	+3	6	Advance to knockout phase
3	Sheikh Jamal DC	3	1	1	1	5	5	0	4	Advance to knockout phase
4	AFC Uttara	3	0	0	3	1	12	−11	0	

Source: Footystats
Rules for classification: Group stage tiebreakers

20 December 2022	AFC Uttara	0–3	Sheikh Jamal DC	Munshigonj
14:30 BST (UTC+6)	Mohammed Rajib (red card) 47'	Report	Otabek Valizhonov 1' (pen.); Kawshik Barua 75'; Mannaf Rabby 78'	Stadium: Munshigonj District Stadium; Referee: Sabuj Das

10 January 2023	Rahmatganj MFS	3–0	Sheikh Jamal DC	Munshigonj
14:45 BST (UTC+6)	Fatkhullo 16'; Michael 45+2' (yellow card) 76'; Jhoaho Hinestroza 76'	Report	Manaf Rabby (yellow card) 7'; Faysal Ahmed (yellow card) 89'	Stadium: Shaheed Bir Sreshtho Flight Lt. Matiur Rahman Stadium; Referee: Md Alamgir Sarkar

31 January 2023	Dhaka Mohammedan	2–2	Sheikh Jamal DC	Gopalganj
15:00 BST	Arif Hossain 28'; Syed Rakib Khan Evan (yellow card) 33'; Miraz Molla (yellow card) 59'; Ashraful Haque Asif 71'	Report	Stewart 54' (yellow card) 76'; Sulayman Sillah 76'	Stadium: Sheikh Fazlul Haque Mani Stadium; Referee: Md Jalal Uddin

==== Knockout stage ====
11 April 2023 Quarter-finals	Dhaka Abahani	1–0	Sheikh Jamal DC	Gopalganj
15:15 BST (UTC+6)	Augusto 81'	Report	Kawshik Barua (yellow card) 13'; Sulayman Sillah (yellow card) 39'	Stadium: Sheikh Fazlul Haque Mani Stadium; Referee: Md Nasir Uddin

=== Independence Cup ===
==== Group stages ====
Pos	Team	Pld	W	D	L	GF	GA	GD	Pts	Qualification
1	Police FC	3	2	1	0	9	5	+4	7	Advance to Knockout stage
2	Sheikh Jamal DC	3	1	1	1	8	6	+2	4	Advance to Knockout stage
3	Rahmatganj MFS	3	1	1	1	6	7	−1	4	
4	BFF Elite Academy	3	0	1	2	2	7	−5	1	

Source: GSA

16 November 2022	Sheikh Jamal DC	3–0	BFF Elite Academy	Comilla
14:00 BST (UTC+6)	Stewart 21', 28', 66'	Report		Stadium: Comilla District Stadium; Referee: Md Nasiruddin

20 November 2022	Sheikh Jamal DC	2–2	Rahmatganj MFS	Comilla
13:00 BST (UTC+6)	Otabek 45+2'; Shakil 53'	Report	Fatkhulloyev 62'; Juel 69'	Stadium: Comilla District Stadium; Referee: Bituraj Barua

24 November 2022	Bangladesh Police FC	4–3	Sheikh Jamal DC	Gopalganj
13:00 BST (UTC+6)	Quazem 9'; Bablu 22'; Malikov 37' (pen.); Hernandez 57'	Report	Stewart 37', 43'; Rasel 76' (o.g.)	Stadium: Sheikh Fazlul Haque Mani Stadium; Referee: Md Alamgir Sarker

==== Knockout stages ====
27 November 2021 Quarter-finals	Dhaka Abahani	2–1 (a.e.t.)	Sheikh Jamal DC	Gopalganj
13:00 BST (UTC+6)	Shakil 30' (o.g.); Rahim 99'	Report	Stewart 77'	Stadium: Sheikh Fazlul Haque Mani Stadium; Referee: Md Alamgir Sarker

== Statistics ==
=== Goalscorers ===
Rank	Player	Position	Total	BPL	Independence Cup	Federation Cup
1	(Saint Vincent and the Grenadines) Cornelius Stewart	FW	17	11	5	1
2	(Uzbekistan) Otabek Valijonov	MF	5	3	1	1
3	(Bangladesh) Kawshik Barua	MF	3	2	0	1
3	(The Gambia) Sulayman Sillah	FW	3	2	0	1
3	(Bangladesh) Manaf Rabby	FW	3	2	0	1
3	(Uzbekistan) Nodir Mavlonov	DF	3	3	0	0
4	(Bangladesh) Obidur Rahman Nawbab	MF	1	1	0	0
4	(Bangladesh) Shakil Ahmed	DF	1	0	1	0
4	(Bangladesh) Abu Shaeid	MF	1	1	0	0
Own goal			1	0	1	0
Total			38	25	8	5

Source: Matches
