= Abu Shaeid =

Bangladeshi footballer

Personal information
- Full name: Mohammed Abu Shaeid
- Date of birth: 6 August 1999 (age 27)
- Place of birth: Nilphamari, Bangladesh
- Height: 1.80 m (5 ft 11 in)
- Position: Defensive midfielder

Team information
- Current team: Dhaka Wanderers
- Number: 7

Senior career*
Years	Team	Apps	(Gls)
2017–2018	Farashganj SC	9	(0)
2018–2021	Saif SC	16	(0)
2021–2022	Dhaka Abahani	16	(0)
2022–2024	Sheikh Jamal DC	27	(1)
2024–2025	Bangladesh Police	15	(0)
2025–2026	Brothers Union	10	(0)
2026–	Dhaka Wanderers	3	(0)

International career
2021–2023	Bangladesh U23	2	(0)
- * Club domestic league appearances and goals as of 24 October 2026

Abu Shaeid (Bengali: আবু শাঈদ; born 6 August 1999) is a Bangladeshi professional footballer who plays as a midfielder for Bangladesh Football League club Dhaka Wanderers.

== Early career ==
Abu Shaeid participated in the Bangabandhu Gold Cup primary school tournament, after which he was called up to attend trials for the 2017 SAFF U-15 Championship bound Bangladesh U16 team. Although Abu Shaeid secured a place in the 30-member preliminary squad, he missed a spot in the final squad due to severe illness. Despite his father persistently urging him to join the Bangladesh Army, he continued to play football at the district and divisional levels due to his mother's intervention. Eventually, in 2017, he was called up to the Bangladesh U19 team.

== Club career ==
In 2017, Abu Shaeid joined Farashganj SC in the Bangladesh Football League after securing a place in the Bangladesh U19 team. On 27 August 2017, Abu Shaeid made his league debut in a 1–2 defeat to Sheikh Russel KC. The following year he signed a contract with Saif Sporting Club which would last till 2021.

In 2021, Abu Shaeid joined Abahani Limited Dhaka. On 7 December 2021, he made his debut against Rahmatganj MFS during the 2021 Independence Cup. He won both the Independence Cup and 2021–22 Federation Cup trophies with the club. He also represented the club against ATK Mohun Bagan in the 2022 AFC Cup qualifying play-offs.

In 2022, Abu Shaeid joined Sheikh Jamal Dhanmondi Club. On 7 July 2023, he scored his first professional goal in a 1–3 defeat to Bashundhara Kings.

== International career ==
Abu Shaeid was part of the youth national teams during the 2020 AFC U-19 Championship qualifiers and 2022 AFC U-23 Asian Cup qualifiers.

Abu Shaeid made the Bangladesh national team preliminary squad for both the 2023 AFC Asian Cup qualifiers and 2023 SAFF Championship, however failed to make the final squad on both occasions.

In 2023, coach Javier Cabrera selected Abu Shaeid in the final squad for the 2022 Asian Games, in Hangzhou, China.

== Career statistics ==
=== Club ===
As of 21 July 2023.

Appearances and goals by club, season and competition
Club	Season	League			Domestic Cup (Note: Appearance(s) in Bangladesh Federation Cup)		Other (Note: Appearance(s) in Bangladesh Independence Cup)		Continental		Total	
Club	Season	Division	Apps	Goals	Apps	Goals	Apps	Goals	Apps	Goals	Apps	Goals
Farashganj SC	2017–18	Bangladesh Football League	9	0	0	0	3	0	0	0	12	0
Saif SC	2018–19	Bangladesh Football League	3	0	0	0	0	0	—		3	0
Saif SC	2019–20	Bangladesh Football League	3	0	0	0	—		—		3	0
Saif SC	2020–21	Bangladesh Football League	10	0	2	0	—		—		12	0
Saif SC	Saif SC total		16	0	2	0	0	0	0	0	18	0
Dhaka Abahani	2021–22	Bangladesh Football League	16	0	1	0	1	0	1 (Note: Appearance(s) in AFC Cup)	0	19	0
Sheikh Jamal DC	2022–23	Bangladesh Football League	12	1	1	0	0	0	—		13	1
Sheikh Jamal DC	2023–24	Bangladesh Football League	0	0	0	0	0	0	—		0	0
Career total			53	1	4	0	4	0	1	0	62	1

== Honours ==
Abahani Limited Dhaka

- Independence Cup: 2021
- Federation Cup: 2021–22
