= 2021–22 Abahani Limited Dhaka season =

Abahani Ltd. Dhaka 2021–22 football season

Abahani Limited Dhaka
2021–22 season
- Director: Kazi Nabil Ahmed
- Head coach: Mário Lemos
- Stadium: Sylhet District Stadium
- Bangladesh Premier League: Runners-up
- Federation Cup: Winners
- Independence Cup: Winners
- AFC Cup: Play off round
- Top goalscorer: League: Dorielton Gomes (18 goals); All: Dorielton Gomes (26 goals)
- Biggest win: 6–0 Vs Sheikh Jamal DC (3 January 2022)
Home colours	Away colours

The 2021–22 season was Abahani Limited Dhaka's 14th consecutive season in the Bangladesh Premier League since initiation of the league, and 47th overall season in the top flight of Bangladeshi football. The season lasted from 1 October 2021 to 31 July 2022.

== Season summary ==
=== November ===
On 21 November 2021, the club signed Iranian forward Milad Sheykh Soleimani from Sepidrood Rasht S.C. for the upcoming season.

On 29 November, Dhaka Abahani played their first match of the season. They managed to win by a score of 2–1 against newly promoted Swadhinata KS. Two goals by Brazilian midfielder Raphael Augusto and midfielder Mehedi Hasan Royal.

==== December ====
On 7 December, Dhaka Abahani defeated Rahmatganj MFS 3–1. At the 14th minute, own goal by Dhaka Abahani's Tutul Hossain Badsha took lead Rahmatganj MFS but after 4 minutes Brazilian forward Dorielton equalized the score. In the second half on 50 minutes penalty goal by Raphael Augusto and 70 minutes penalty goal by Dorielton made scored 3–1

On 10 December, Dhaka Abahani thrashed Bangladesh Army football team by 4-0 goals. Costa Rican forward Daniel Colindres opened his account for Dhaka Abahani in the very last minutes of the first half 45 minutes and his second on 70 minutes. Nabib Newaj Jibon on 67 minutes and Emon Mahmud Babu on 76 minutes goals gave Abahani big win also through to the semi-finals.

On 14 December, Dhaka Abahani defeated by 2–0 goals Saif Sporting Club. On 25 minutes Nabib Newaj Jibon goal took the lead 1–0 lead they have finished first half. In the second half 81 minutes Costa Rican forward Daniel Colindres goal made score 2–0 secured victory. Dhaka Abahani through to the Final.

On 18 December, Dhaka Abahani defeated by 3–0 goals Bashundhara Kings. The first half of the match were goalless, in the second half 53 minutes goal by Rakib Hossain Abahani took the lead. In the 67, 72 minutes two goals by Brazilian forward Dorielton Abahani crowned their titles after 1991.

On 25 December 2021, Dhaka Abahani won by 3–0 Walkover laws. The match was scheduled to be played against Uttar Baridhara Club but Uttar Baridhara Club withdrew their name from the tournament.

On 29 December, Dhaka Abahanindraw 2–2 against Sheikh Russel KC. In the First half on 8 minutes goal by Dorielton took lead Dhaka Abahani but after 12 minutes Mannaf Rabbi level the score for Sheikh Russel KC. In the second half again Dhaka Abahani took lead on 61 minutes second goal of Dorielton. In the 84 minutes Ailton Machado goal level the score 2–2 and end the match with draw. But due to withdrawn Uttar Baridhara Club participation in the tournament both teams' points were equal, and the referee used penalties shoot out to decided group champion which Sheikh Russel KC won 13–12.

=== January ===
On 3 January, Dhaka Abahani won 6–0 against Sheikh Jamal DC. In the first half on 22 minutes goal by Dorielton and 35 Raphael Augusto took lead Abahani and go to half time break. In the second half on 62 Dorielton made it 3–0. In the 70 minutes Daniel Colindres found the net. Nabib Newaj Jibon on 81 and 90+1 minutes double Dhaka Abahai thrashed Sheikh Jamal DC 6–0.

On 6 January, Dhaka Abahani won 3(3)–3(4) penalties shoot out against Saif Sporting Club. On 10 minutes first half Raphael Augusto gave lead Dhaka Abahani but Mfon Udoh equalized score on 19 minutes and finished half time 1–1. In the second half 74 minutes Emeka Ogbugh made score 2–1 until 90 minutes and Saif about to through the final but on 90+3 minutes Daniel Colindres goal level the score 2–2. In the extra time 90+4 minutes Rakib Hossain goal again Abahani took lead but on 120+3 minutes Saif SC Sazzad Hossain draw the scoreline 3–3. In the penalties shoot out Dhaka Abahani won 4–3 and through to the Final.

On 9 January, Dhaka Abahani won 2–1 against Rahmatganj MFS in the final match of Federation Cup Bangladesh. In the first half both clubs play excellent but they wouldn't get goals until scored Dainiel Colindres on 45+1 minutes. In the second half Rakib Hossain extended the score 2–0. On 70 minutes Philip Adjah goal made scoreline 2–1 and Rahmatganj MFS finished their tournament journey will runner up trophy and Dhaka Abahani grabbed 12th Federation Cup trophy.

=== February ===
On 4 February, Dhaka Abahani met Muktijoddha Sangsad KC in their home match and won 1–0. In the first half on 12 minutes Brazilian forward Dorielton goals got lead played first half 1–0 goal lead. In the second half both teams are played goalless and Dhaka Abahani got three points.

On 8 February, Dhaka Abahani drawn 1–1 goals away match against Bangladesh Police FC. In the first half time both teams played excellent and competitive football and until half time score 0–0 goal. In the second half on 76 minutes a goal by Danilo Quipapá Bangladesh Police FC got lead 1–0 until addition time scored by Dhaka Abahani on (90+3) minutes Dorielton match finished with a 1–1 goals drawn.

On 13 February, Dhaka Abahani defeated Rahmatganj MFS by 3–0 goals at home. In the first half on 40, 43 and 45+1 minutes hat trick goals by Dorielton took lead with 3–0. In the second half Rahamtganj MFS tried to fought back but Dhaka Abahani players kept them in check to avoid any score. Dhaka Abahani left the field with full three points.

On 18 February, Dhaka Abahai defeated 3–1 goals Sheikh Russel KC in the away match. In the first halftime both teams has played goalless. In the second half on 49 minutes Jewel Rana open account for Dhaka Abahani and second goals on 61 minutes by Milad Sheykh Soleimani made score 2–0. On 64 minutes goal by Esmaël Gonçalves made score 2–1 and Nabib Newaj Jibon goal on 84 minutes Dhaka Abahani secured win the game.

On 23 February, Dhaka Abahani defeated by 1–0 goal Dhaka Mohammedan at home match. In the first half on 28 minutes Sohel Rana goal took lead Dhaka Abahni and finished halftime with score 1–0. In the second half Dhaka Mohammedan tried to score goal to avoid lost the Dhaka Derby match of the season but they won't able to do it. Dhaka Abahai got victory against their rivery Dhaka Mohammedan 1–0 goal and they got place on top of BPL.

=== March ===
On 1 March Dhaka, Abahani lost to Chittagong Abahani by 2–3 goals at home venue. On 16 minutes Daniel Colindres goal took lead Dhaka Abahani 1–0 goal but after 4 minutes Chittagong Abahani Nigerian midfielder Peter Ebimobowei leveled the score 1–1 but on 37 minutes South African forward William Twala goal got lead Chittagong Abahani 2–1 goals and finished first half. In the second half on 64 minutes Afghanistan midfielder Omid Popalzay goals Chittagong make score 3–1 and they are about to win the game but on 89 Raphael Augusto goal reduced Dhaka Abahani defeat 2–3 goals.

On 6 March Dhaka, Abahani defeated Saif Sporting Club by 2–1 goals at home venue.

On 11 March Dhaka, Abahani drew to Swadhinata KS by 1–1 in the away match.

On 16 March Dhaka, Abahani drew 0–0 against Sheikh Jamal DC in the away match.

=== April ===
On 3 April, Dhaka Abahani drew against Bashundhara Kings by 2–2 at home ground. On 20 minutes Costa Rican forward Daniel Colindres goal got lead Dhaka Abahani 1–0 goal, meanwhile Bashundhara Kings players did not found the net in the first half. In the second half on 64 minutes Eleta Kingsley and Brazilian forward Robson goals got 2–1 goals advantage Bashundhara Kings but on 84 minutes Dorielton goal equalized score 2–2 goals both giants teams satisfied with share points.

On 7 April 2022, Dhaka Abahani drew against Uttar Baridhara Club by 5–2 goals at home ground. In the very first minutes Daniel Colindres open goal account for Dhaka Abahani and after three minutes second goal for Dhaka Abahani by Nabib Newaj Jibon make it 2–0 but on 14 Minutes Papon Singh score for Uttar Baridhara Club. At 24 minutes, Jewel Rana and again Daniel Colindres at 35 minutes converted score to 4–1 until first half break. At 61 minutes, Dhaka Abahani's Raphael Augusto made the score 5–1, but at 68 minutes, Uttar Baridhara Club midfielder Arif Hossain founded the net they have reduced their defeat to 5–2 goals. In the 90+1 minutes Uttar Baridhara Club goalkeeper Mohammed Azad Hossen showed red card and sent off him.

On 12 April, Dhaka Abahani scheduled to play against Club Valencia Maldives in their Preliminary round 2 match. But on 10 April Club Valencia withdrew their name due financial issue and they have sent their official statement to AFC that's they will not travel to Bangladesh. On 12 April AFC awarded Dhaka Abahani were winner of the match by Walkover laws 3–0 goals.

On 19 April, Dhaka Abahani lost to ATK Mohun Bagan by 1–3 goals at Kolkata in the playoff match of AFC 2022.

On 29 April, Dhaka Abahani beat Bangladesh Police FC by 2–1 goals at their home stadium.

=== May ===
On 7 May, Dhaka Abahani won by 2–1 against Rahmatganj MFS in the away game.

On 12 May, Dhaka Abahani drew against Sheikh Russel KC by 1–1 at home.

=== June ===
On 22 June, Dhaka Abahani won against their rival club Dhaka Mohammedan by 4–2 goals in the away game.

On 28 June, Dhaka Abahani won against port city club Chittagong Abahani 3–2 on their opponent's home ground.

=== July ===
On 19 July, Dhaka Abahani won against Sheikh Jamal DC by 5–0 goals in a home game.

On 25 July, Dhaka Abahani have lost to Bashundhara Kings by 2–3 goals in the opponent ground.

On 31 July, Dhaka Abahani got victory against Uttar Baridhara Club by 5–2 goals on the away ground.

== Current squad ==
Abahani Limited Dhaka squad for 2021–22 season.

As of 6 April 2022

Note: Flags indicate national team as defined under FIFA eligibility rules; some limited exceptions apply. Players may hold more than one non-FIFA nationality.

No.	Pos.	Nation	Player
1	GK	BAN	Shahidul Alam Sohel
2	DF	BAN	Sushanto Tripura
3	DF	BAN	Nurul Naium Faisal
4	DF	BAN	Rezaul Karim Reza
5	DF	BAN	Tutul Hossain Badsha
6	MF	BAN	Emon Mahmud Babu
7	MF	BAN	Jewel Rana
10	FW	BAN	Nabib Newaj Jibon (Captain)
11	FW	BAN	Rakib Hossain
12	FW	CRC	Daniel Colindres
13	MF	BAN	Abu Shaeid
14	DF	BAN	Mamun Miah
15	DF	BAN	Shakir Ahmed
16	MF	BAN	Mohamed Sohel Rana

No.	Pos.	Nation	Player
17	FW	BAN	Mehedi Hasan Royal
18	GK	BAN	Mahfuz Hasan Pritom
19	DF	BAN	Monir Hossain
21	DF	BAN	Muhammad Nazim Uddin
22	GK	BAN	Arifuzzaman Himel
23	MF	BAN	Mohammad Ridoy
24	DF	BAN	Syed Arafat Hossain Tasin
25	GK	BAN	Md. Shamim Hossen
27	MF	BAN	Mohammad Al-Amin
28	MF	BAN	Tonmoy Das
29	MF	BAN	Imtiaz Sultan Jitu
30	GK	BAN	Rayhan Ahmed Jaber
35	MF	BAN	Al-Amin Hassan Aanaf
80	MF	BRA	Raphael Augusto

== Transfer ==
=== In ===
No.	Pos	Player	Previous club	Fee	Date	Source
19	DF	(Bangladesh) Monir Hossain	(Bangladesh) Sheikh Jamal DC	Free transfer	September 2021	
13	MF	(Bangladesh) Abu Shaeid	(Bangladesh) Saif Sporting Club	Free transfer	September 2021	
21	FW	(Brazil) Dorielton	(China) Sichuan Jiuniu F.C.	Free transfer	21 November 2021	
26	FW	(Costa Rica) Daniel Colindres	(Costa Rica) Deportivo Saprissa	Free transfer	21 November 2021	
5	FW	(Iran) Milad Sheykh Soleimani	(Iran) Sepidrood Rasht S.C.	Free transfer	22 November 2021	

=== Out ===
No.	Pos	Player	Moved to	Fee	Date	Source
19	DF	(Afghanistan) Masih Saighani	(India) Real Kashmir FC	Free transfer	September 2021	
7	MF	(Bangladesh) Sohel Rana	(Bangladesh) Bashundhara Kings	Free transfer	28 September 2021	
6	MF	(Bangladesh) Mamunul Islam	(Bangladesh) Dhaka Mohammedan	Free	18 November 2021	

== Pre-season and friendlies ==
Win Draw Loss Fixtures

24 November 2021	Abahani Ltd. Dhaka	1–0	Rahmatganj MFS	Dhaka
15:00 BST (UTC+6)	Emon			Stadium: Abahani Field

== Competitions ==
Win Draw Loss Fixtures

=== Overall ===
Competition	First match	Last match	Final Position
BPL	4 February 2022	31 July 2022	Runners-up
Federation Cup	25 December 2021	9 January 2022	Winner
Independence Cup	29 November 2021	18 December 2021	Winner
AFC Cup	12 April 2022	19 April 2022	Play off round

=== Overview ===
Competition	Record							
Competition	Pld	W	D	L	GF	GA	GD	Win %
BPL	22	14	5	3	55	31	+24	63.64
Independence Cup	5	5	0	0	14	2	+12	100.00
Federation Cup	5	4	1	0	16	6	+10	80.00
AFC Cup	2	1	0	1	1	3	−2	50.00
Total	34	24	6	4	86	42	+44	70.59

Source: Competitions

=== Independence Cup ===
==== Group A ====
Pos	Team	Pld	W	D	L	GF	GA	GD	Pts	Status
1	Dhaka Abahani	2	2	0	0	5	2	+3	6	Qualified for Knockout stage
2	Swadhinata KS	2	1	0	1	4	4	0	3	Qualified for Knockout stage
3	Rahmatganj MFS	2	0	0	2	3	6	−3	0	

Source: Global Sports Archive
Rules for classification: Group stage tiebreakers

29 November 2021	Swadhinata KS	1–2	Dhaka Abahani	Dhaka
17:45 BST (UTC+6)	Nodir 91'	Report	Royal 29'; Raphael 74'	Stadium: BSSS Mostafa Kamal Stadium; Referee: Jasim Akter

7 December 2021	Dhaka Abahani	3–1	Rahmatganj MFS	Dhaka
17:45 BST (UTC+6)	Dorielton (17 (pen.)), 50'; Raphael 70' (pen.)	Report	Tutul 14' (o.g.)	Stadium: BSSS Mostafa Kamal Stadium; Referee: Bituraj Barua

==== Knockout stage ====
10 December 2021 Quarter-finals	Dhaka Abahani	4–0	Bangladesh Army	Dhaka
17:15 BST (UTC+6)	Colindres 45', 70'; Jibon 67'; Emon 76'	Report		Stadium: BSSS Mostafa Kamal Stadium; Referee: Bituraj Barua

14 December 2021 Semi-finals	Dhaka Abahani	2–0	Saif Sporting Club	Dhaka
17:15 BST (UTC+6)	Colindres 25'; Jibon 82'	Report		Stadium: BSSS Mostafa Kamal Stadium; Referee: Md Mizanur Rahman

18 December 2021 Final	Dhaka Abahani	3–0	Bashundhara Kings	Dhaka
17:30 BST (UTC+6)	Rakib 53'; Dorielton 63' (pen.), 72'	Report		Stadium: BSSS Mostafa Kamal Stadium; Referee: Md Alamgir Sarkar

=== Federation Cup ===
==== Group B ====
Pos	Team	Pld	W	D	L	GF	GA	GD	Pts	Status
1	Sheikh Russel KC	2	1	1	0	5	2	+3	4 (Note: As the fair play points of the two teams were equal, the group champion and runners-up were determined through a penalty shootout. Sheikh Russel KC (13–12) Dhaka Abahani.)	Advance to Knockout stage
2	Dhaka Abahani	2	1	1	0	5	2	+3	4	Advance to Knockout stage
3	Uttar Baridhara Club	2	0	0	2	0	6	−6	0	Later withdrew

Source: Soccerway
Rules for classification: Group stage tiebreakers
Notes:

25 December 2022	Dhaka Abahani	3–0	Uttar Baridhara	Dhaka
18:45 BST (UTC+6)		Report		Stadium: BSSS Mostafa Kamal Stadium; Referee: Bituraj Borua
Note: Dhaka Abahani were awarded walkover win by 3 goals since Uttar Baridhara Club didn't turn up for the match

29 December 2022	Dhaka Abahani	2–2 (12–13 p)	Sheikh Russel KC	Dhaka
16:00 BST (UTC+6)	Dorielton 8', 61'	Report	Rabbi 20'; Ailton 84'	Stadium: BSSS Mostafa Kamal Stadium; Referee: Mohammed Jalaluddin

==== Knockout stage ====
3 January 2022 Quarter-finals	Sheikh Jamal DC	0–6	Dhaka Abahani	Dhaka
19:30 BST (UTC+6)		Report	Dorielton 22', 62'; Raphael 35' (pen.): Colindres 70'; Nabib 81', 90+1'	Stadium: BSSS Mostafa Kamal Stadium; Referee: Md Mizanur Rahman

6 January 2022 Semi-finals	Saif Sporting Club	3–3 (3–4 p)	Dhaka Abahani	Dhaka
16:30 BST (UTC+6)	Mfon 19'; Ogbugh 74' (pen.); Sazzad 120+3'	Report	Raphael 10' (pen.); Colindres 90+3'; Rakib 94'	Stadium: BSSS Mostafa Kamal Stadium; Referee: Md Saymoon Hasan Sany
	Penalties
	Bayisenge (penalty scored); Udoh (penalty missed); Sazzad (penalty scored); Fahim (penalty scored); Jamal (penalty missed)		Milad (penalty scored); Rezaul (penalty scored); Mehedi (penalty scored); Mamun (penalty missed); Raphael (penalty scored)

9 January 2022 Final	Rahmatganj MFS	1–2	Dhaka Abahani	Dhaka
17:00 BST (UTC+6)	Adjah 70'	Report	Colindres 45+1'; Rakib 64'	Stadium: BSSS Mostafa Kamal Stadium; Attendance: Bituraj Borua

=== Premier League ===
==== League table ====
Pos	Team	Pld	W	D	L	GF	GA	GD	Pts	Qualification or relegation
1	Bashundhara Kings (C, Q)	22	18	3	1	53	21	+32	57	Qualification for 2023 AFC Champions League Play-off round or 2023 AFC Cup Group Stage
2	Dhaka Abahani (Q)	22	14	5	3	55	31	+24	47	Qualification for 2023 AFC Cup Play-off round
3	Saif Sporting Club	22	11	4	7	58	37	+21	37	
4	Sheikh Jamal DC	22	9	8	5	34	31	+3	35	
5	Dhaka Mohammedan	22	8	9	5	39	26	+13	33	

Source: Soccerway
Rules for classification: 1) Points; 2) Goal difference; 3) Goals scored.
(C) Champions; (Q) Qualify for the AFC competition

==== Results summary ====
Overall								Home						Away					
Pld	W	D	L	GF	GA	GD	Pts	W	D	L	GF	GA	GD	W	D	L	GF	GA	GD
22	14	5	3	55	31	+24	47	8	2	1	27	10	+17	6	3	2	28	21	+7

Source: Soccerway

==== Results by round ====
Round	1	2	3	4	5	6	7	8	9	10	11	12	13	14	15	16	17	18	19	20	21	22
Ground	H	A	H	A	H	H	H	A	A	A	H	A	H	A	H	A	A	A	H	H	A	A
Result	W	D	W	W	W	L	W	D	D	D	W	W	W	W	D	W	L	L	W	W	L	W
Position	4	4	2	1	1	2	2	2	2	3	2	2	2	2	2	2	2	2	2	2	2	2

Source: Matches
A = Away; H = Home; W = Win; D = Draw; L = Loss; P = Postponed

=== Matches ===
4 February 2022 1	Dhaka Abahani	1–0	Muktijoddha Sangsad KC	Gazipur
15:00 BST (UTC+6)	Dorielton 12'	Report	I. Shakil (yellow card) 79'	Stadium: Shaheed Ahsan Ullah Master Stadium; Referee: Md Anisur Rahman

8 February 2022 2	Bangladesh Police FC	1–1	Dhaka Abahani	Munshigonj
15:00 BST (UTC+6)	I. Faysal (yellow card) 42'; M. Nehal (yellow card) 45'; Danilo 76' (yellow card) 89'; Monaem Khan Raju (yellow card) 78'; N. Rubel (yellow card) 78'	Report	Rakib (yellow card) 63'; Dorielton 90+3'	Stadium: Munshigonj District Stadium; Referee: Md Symoon Hasan

13 February 2022 3	Dhaka Abahani	3–0	Rahmatganj MFS	Gazipur
15:00 BST (UTC+6)	Dorielton 40', 43', 45+1'	Report		Stadium: Shaheed Ahsan Ullah Master Stadium; Referee: Azad Rahman

18 February 2022 4	Sheikh Russel KC	1–3	Dhaka Abahani	Dhaka
15:00 BST (UTC+6)	Saad (yellow card) 21'; Esmaël 64'	Report	Jewel 49'; Milad 61'; Sushanto (yellow card) 76'; Jibon 84'	Stadium: Bashundhara Kings Arena; Referee: Golam Mourshed Chowdhury

23 February 2022 5	Dhaka Abahani	1–0	Dhaka Mohammedan	Sylhet
15:00 BST (UTC+6)	Shahidul (yellow card) 4'; Rezaul (yellow card) 10' Sohel 28' Jewel (yellow card) 39' Jibon (yellow card) 45+1'	Report	Moneke (yellow card) 4' Jasmin (yellow card) 4' Masud (yellow card) 6'	Stadium: Sylhet District Stadium; Referee: Md Alamgir Sarker

1 March 2022 6	Dhaka Abahani	2–3	Chittagong Abahani	Sylhet
15:00 BST (UTC+6)	Colindres 16' (yellow card) 45+8'; Raphael; 89': Milad (yellow card) 71'	Report	Peter 20'; Twala 37'; Popalzay 64'	Stadium: Sylhet District Stadium; Referee: Md Saymoon Hasan

6 March 2022 7	Dhaka Abahani	2–1	Saif Sporting Club	Sylhet
15:00 BST (UTC+6)	Sushanto (yellow card) 23'; Dorielton 75'; Colindres (yellow card) 75' (goal) 90+3' (pen.); Milad (yellow card) 83'; Abu Shaied (yellow card) 85'	Report	Emery 69'	Stadium: Sylhet District Stadium; Referee: Mohammed Jalaluddin

11 March 2022 8	Swadhinata KS	1–1	Dhaka Abahani	Rajshahi
15:00 BST (UTC+6)	Iqbal 80'	Report	Jibon 39'; Jewel (yellow card) 69'; Mavlonov (yellow card) 90+1'; Emon (yellow card) 90+4'	Stadium: Rajshahi District Stadium; Referee: Bituraj Barua

16 March 2022 9	Sheikh Jamal DC	0–0	Dhaka Abahani	Munshigonj
15:00 BST (UTC+6)	Shahin (yellow card) 19'; Ariful (yellow card) 70'; Valijonov (yellow card) 70'	Report	Sushanto (yellow card) 45'	Stadium: Munshigonj District Stadium; Referee: Anisur Rahman

3 April 2022 10	Dhaka Abahani	2–2	Bashundhara Kings	Sylhet
15:30 BST (UTC+6)	Colindres 20'; Dorielton 84'		Sohel (red card) 27'; Kingsley 64'; Robinho 69' (yellow card) 70'; Tariq (yellow card) 82'	Stadium: Sylhet District Stadium; Referee: Anisur Rahman

7 April 2022 11	Dhaka Abahani	5–2	Uttar Baridhara Club	Sylhet
17:30 BST (UTC+6)	Colindres 1', 35'; Jibon 4'; Jewel 24'; Raphael 61' (pen.)	Report	Kahraba (yellow card) 10'; Papon 14' (yellow card) 33'; Biplob (yellow card) 65'; Arif 68'; Azad (red card) 90+1'	Stadium: Sylhet District Stadium; Referee: Alamgir Sarker

25 April 2022 12	Muktijoddha Sangsad KC	3–4	Dhaka Abahani	Gopalganj
15:30 BST (UTC+6)	Misawa 34' (pen.), 90+5' (pen.); Otani 50'	Report	Soleimani (yellow card) 34'; Shaeid (yellow card) 44'; Colindres 65'; Rakib 66', 80'; Raphael 75'	Stadium: Sheikh Fazlul Haque Mani Stadium; Referee: Mohammed Jalaluddin

30 April 2022 13	Dhaka Abahani	2–1	Bangladesh Police FC	Sylhet
15:45 BST (UTC+6)	Jewel 22', 68'	Report	Al Amin 17'; Joyonto (yellow card) 44'	Stadium: Sylhet District Stadium; Referee: Alamgir Sarker

7 May 2022 14	Rahmatganj MFS	1–2	Dhaka Abahani	Sylhet
15:45 BST (UTC+6)	Sajeeb (yellow card) 35'; Mezbah 90+2'	Report	Mehedi 14'; Jewel 22'; Sushanto (yellow card) 42'; Soleimani (yellow card) 60'	Stadium: Sylhet District Stadium; Referee: Alamgir Sarker

12 May 2022 15	Dhaka Abahani	1–1	Sheikh Russel KC	Sylhet
15:45 BST (UTC+6)	Shahidul (yellow card) 28'; Mehedi 34'; Faisal (yellow card) 90+5'; Sohel (yellow card) 90+5'	Report	Rabbi (yellow card) 79'; Manik (red card) 80'; Hemanta (yellow card) 80'; Dipok (yellow card) 85' (goal) 90+6'	Stadium: Sylhet District Stadium; Referee: Anisur Rahman

22 June 2022 16	Dhaka Mohammedan	2–4	Dhaka Abahani	Comilla
16:00 BST (UTC+6)	Diabate 18'; Shahriar 45+2'	Report	Colindres 8'; Dorielton 10', 45+5'; Sushanto (yellow card) 32'; Emon 43'; Karim (yellow card) 71' (yellow-red card) 81'	Stadium: Comilla District Stadium; Referee: Bituraj Barua

28 June 2022 17	Chittagong Abahani	2–3	Dhaka Abahani	Cumilla
16:00 BST (UTC+6)	O. Popalzay 32'; Peter Ebi 40' (pen.); Candy (yellow card) 45+5' (yellow-red card) 57'; Yisa (yellow card) 55'	Report	Monir Hossain (yellow card) 31'; Dorielton 34', 71'; Royal (yellow card) 45+5'; Faisal 78'	Stadium: Shaheed Dhirendranath Datta Stadium; Referee: Mohammed Jalal Uddin

3 July 2022 18	Saif Sporting Club	4–2	Dhaka Abahani	Munshigonj
15:30 BST (UTC+6)	Mfon 14'; Sabuj 40'; Rahim 65'; Emery 71' (pen.)	Report	Dorielton 34'; Colindres 90+6'	Stadium: Munshigonj District Stadium; Referee: Bhubon Mohon Tarafder

14 July 2022 19	Dhaka Abahani	4–1	Swadhinata KS	Comilla
16:00 BST (UTC+6)	Colindres 20'; Dorielton 24', 57'; Raphael 80'	Report	Shakil (yellow card) 34'; Suzuki 45+3'; Ekbal (yellow card) 77'	Stadium: Comilla District Stadium; Referee: Anwar Hossain Saju

19 July 2022 20	Dhaka Abahani	5–0	Sheikh Jamal DC	Comilla
16:00 BST (UTC+6)	Emon 8'; Raphael 38'; Colindr8es 42'; Al-Amin (yellow card) 64'; Jibon 77', 82'	Report		Stadium: Comilla District Stadium; Referee: Mohamad Alamgir

25 July 2022 21	Bashundhara Kings	3–2	Dhaka Abahani	Dhaka
16:00 BST (UTC+6)	Nuha 20'; Robinho 71', 90+1'	Report	Shahidul (yellow card) 18'; Rakib (yellow card) 19' (goal) 45+1'; Monir (yellow card) 88'; Raphael 90+6'	Stadium: Bashundhara Kings Arena; Referee: Golam Murshed Chowdhury Nayan

31 July 2022 22	Uttar Baridhara Club	2–5	Dhaka Abahani	Gopalganj
16:00 BST (UTC+6)	Maruf 48'; Fozilov 83'; Mostafa (yellow card) 87'	Report	Dori 18', 23', 40', 73'; Karim (yellow card) 50'; Raphael 58'	Stadium: Sheikh Fazlul Haque Mani Stadium; Referee: Bhubon Mohon Tarafder

=== AFC Cup ===
==== Preliminary round 2 ====
12 April 2022	Dhaka Abahani (Bangladesh)	Cancelled	(Maldives) Club Valencia	Sylhet, Bangladesh
18:00 BST (UTC+6)		Report		Stadium: Sylhet District Stadium; Referee: Akhrol Riskullayev (Uzbekistan)
Note: Club Valencia withdrew their name before 2 days ago kick off the match. So AFC were awarded that Dhaka Abahani winner of the match as a Walkover law.

==== Play off round ====
19 April 2022	ATK Mohun Bagan (India)	3–1	(Bangladesh) Dhaka Abahani	Kolkata
19:30 BST (UTC+6:00)	Willams 6', 30', 85'; Boumous; (yellow card) 44': Tangri; (yellow card) 45+1'	Report	Colindres (yellow card) 18' (goal) 61'; Soleimani (yellow card) 44'; Royal (yellow card) 90+1'	Stadium: Salt Lake Stadium; Attendance: 31,925; Referee: Seyed Vahid Kazemi (Iran)

== Statistics ==
=== Goalscorers ===
As of match played till 31 July 2022

Rank	Player	Position	Total	BPL	Independence Cup	Federation Cup	AFC Cup
1	(Brazil) Dorielton Gomes	FW	26	18	4	4	0
2	(Costa Rica) Daniel Colindres	FW	17	10	3	3	1
3	(Brazil) Raphael Augusto	MF	11	7	2	2	0
4	(Bangladesh) Nabib Newaj Jibon	FW	9	5	2	2	0
5	(Bangladesh) Rakib Hossain	MF	6	3	1	2	0
6	(Bangladesh) Jewel Rana	MF	5	5	0	0	0
7	(Bangladesh) Mehedi Hasan Royal	MF	3	2	1	0	0
7	(Bangladesh) Emon Mahmud Babu	MF	3	2	1	0	0
8	(Bangladesh) Sohel Rana	MF	1	1	0	0	0
8	(Bangladesh) Nurul Naium Faisal	DF	1	1	0	0	0
8	(Iran) Milad Sheykh Soleimani	DF	1	1	0	0	0
Total			83	55	14	13	1

Source: Matches
