= Jorge Aguilar (footballer) =

Paraguayan footballer (born 1993)

Personal information
- Full name: Jorge Luis Aguilar Miranda
- Date of birth: 4 February 1993 (age 33)
- Place of birth: Paraguarí, Paraguay
- Height: 1.83 m (6 ft 0 in)
- Position: Defender

Team information
- Current team: Estudiantes

Senior career*
Years	Team	Apps	(Gls)
2016	General Caballero	18	(0)
2018-2019	Deportivo Santaní	46	(3)
2019-2020	Querétaro	8	(1)
2020	Tijuana	8	(0)
2021	Necaxa	5	(0)
2021–2022	Sol de América	3	(0)
2022–2023	Sheikh Jamal DC	11	(0)
2023–	Estudiantes	6	(0)
- * Club domestic league appearances and goals as of 22 September 2023

Jorge Luis Aguilar Miranda (born 4 February 1993) is a Paraguayan professional footballer who plays as a defender for Venezuelan Primera División club Estudiantes.
