= Shakil Ahmed (footballer, born 1994) =

Bangladeshi footballer

Personal information
- Full name: Mohamed Shakil Ahmed
- Date of birth: 23 April 1994 (age 32)
- Place of birth: Dhaka, Bangladesh
- Height: 1.65 m (5 ft 5 in)
- Position: Left-back

Team information
- Current team: Dhaka Wanderers
- Number: 3

Senior career*
Years	Team	Apps	(Gls)
2012–2015	BJMC	?	(?)
2015–2017	Dhaka Abahani	?	(?)
2017–2018	Saif	12	(0)
2018–2019	Rahmatganj	22	(0)
2019–2024	Sheikh Jamal	63	(0)
2024–2025	Fortis	1	(0)
2025–2026	Arambagh	13	(0)
2026–	Dhaka Wanderers	1	(0)

International career
2015	Bangladesh U23	3	(0)
2016	Bangladesh	2	(0)
- * Club domestic league appearances and goals as of 18 September 2026

Shakil Ahmed (Bengali: শাকিল আহমেদ; born 23 April 1994) is a Bangladeshi professional footballer who plays as a left-back for Bangladesh Football League club Dhaka Wanderers.

== Club career ==
On 21 August 2021, Shakil along with Sheikh Jamal Dhanmondi Club teammate Faisal Ahmed physically attacked Brothers Union fans and ballboys during a 2020–21 Bangladesh Premier League encounter. On 27 August, the Bangladesh Football Federation banned both players for one match, while Sheikh Jamal were fined Tk 1 lakh.

== International career ==
On 18 March 2016, Shakil made his international debut against UAE.

Shakil was called up to the Bangladesh national football team for the 2018 FIFA World Cup qualification – AFC second round. On 24 March 2016, he played his only match in the qualifiers against Jordan.

== Honours ==
Abahani Limited Dhaka

- Bangladesh Premier League: 2016
- Federation Cup: 2016
