= Rafał Zaborowski =

Polish footballer (born 1994)

Personal information
- Full name: Rafał Aureliusz Zaborowski
- Date of birth: 1 March 1994 (age 32)
- Place of birth: Chorzów, Poland
- Height: 1.80 m (5 ft 11 in)
- Positions: Attacking midfielder; winger

Team information
- Current team: Szczakowianka Jaworzno
- Number: 19

Youth career
- 2009–2013: Stadion Śląski Chorzów

Senior career*
Years	Team	Apps	(Gls)
2013–2017	Ruch Radzionków		
2015	→ LZS Piotrówka (loan)	12	(1)
2016	→ JKS 1909 Jarosław (loan)	8	(0)
2016	→ Gwarek Ornontowice (loan)		
2017–2018	Harstad	25	(0)
2019	Irodotos	11	(1)
2019	Viitorul Târgu Jiu	3	(0)
2020	Partizán Bardejov	1	(0)
2021	Pandurii Târgu Jiu	16	(0)
2021–2022	Swadhinata Krira Sangha	11	(1)
2023	LKS Goczałkowice-Zdrój	1	(0)
2023–2024	Aizawl	4	(0)
2024–	Szczakowianka Jaworzno	21	(3)

International career
2011–2012	Poland U18	2	(1)
- * Club domestic league appearances and goals as of 09:51, 19 June 2025 (UTC)

Rafał Aureliusz Zaborowski (born 1 March 1994) is a Polish professional footballer who plays as an attacking midfielder for V liga Silesia club Szczakowianka Jaworzno. In his career, Zaborowski also played for teams such as Ruch Radzionków, Viitorul Târgu Jiu or Irodotos, among others.

== Playing career ==
=== Stadion Śląski Chorzów ===
Zaborowski was born in Chorzów. At the age of six he started playing for Stadion Śląski Chorzów – a club known for developing young players.

=== Ruch Radzionków ===
In the summer of 2013, Zaborowski signed a two-year professional contract with Polish I liga side Ruch Radzionków.

=== LZS Piotrówka ===
In August 2015, after financial problems in Ruch Radzionków, Zaborowski decided to leave on loan to LZS Piotrówka.

=== JKS 1909 Jarosław ===
After leaving Piotrówka in the winter of 2016, Zaborowski signed with Jarosław in March. Despite an unsuccessful fight for promotion, he managed to win the regional Polish Cup tournament during his tenure with JKS.

=== Harstad IL ===
In March 2017, Zaborowski signed a two-year contract with 2. divisjon side Harstad. It was his first abroad contract.

=== Irodotos FC ===
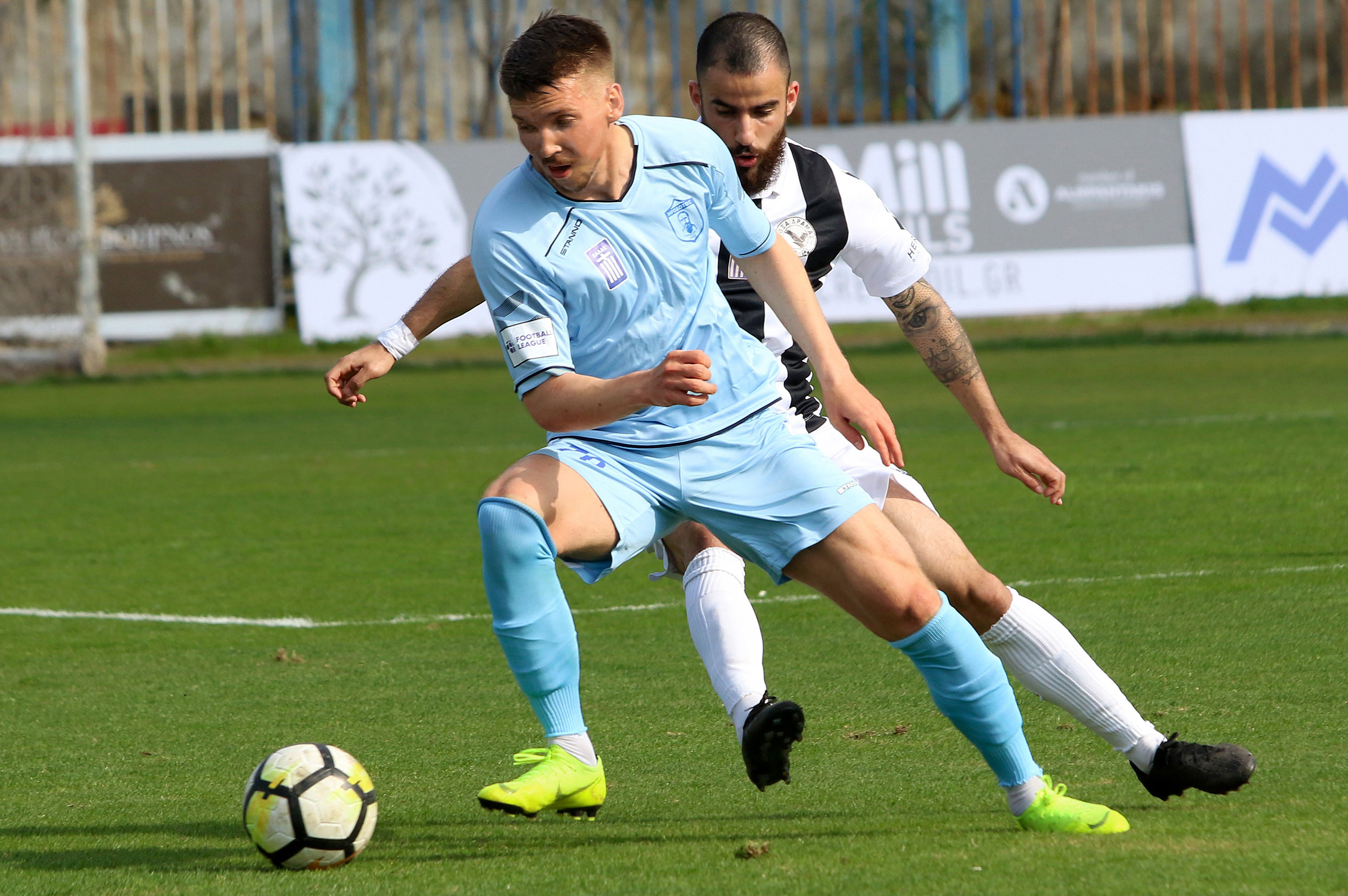
Zaborowski playing for Irodotos against Doxa Dramas in March 2019

In early January 2019, Zaborowski joined Greek Super League 2 side Irodotos. He was initially unable to make his debut due to issues with receiving his certificate from Norway. Zaborowski made his debut on 28 January 2019 in a 0–1 loss against Panachaiki. On 10 March, Zaborowski scored the decisive goal in a 2–1 win against Chania in the Crete derby. Due to the reorganization of the league in Greece after the 2019/20 season, his team was relegated and he left the club shortly after.

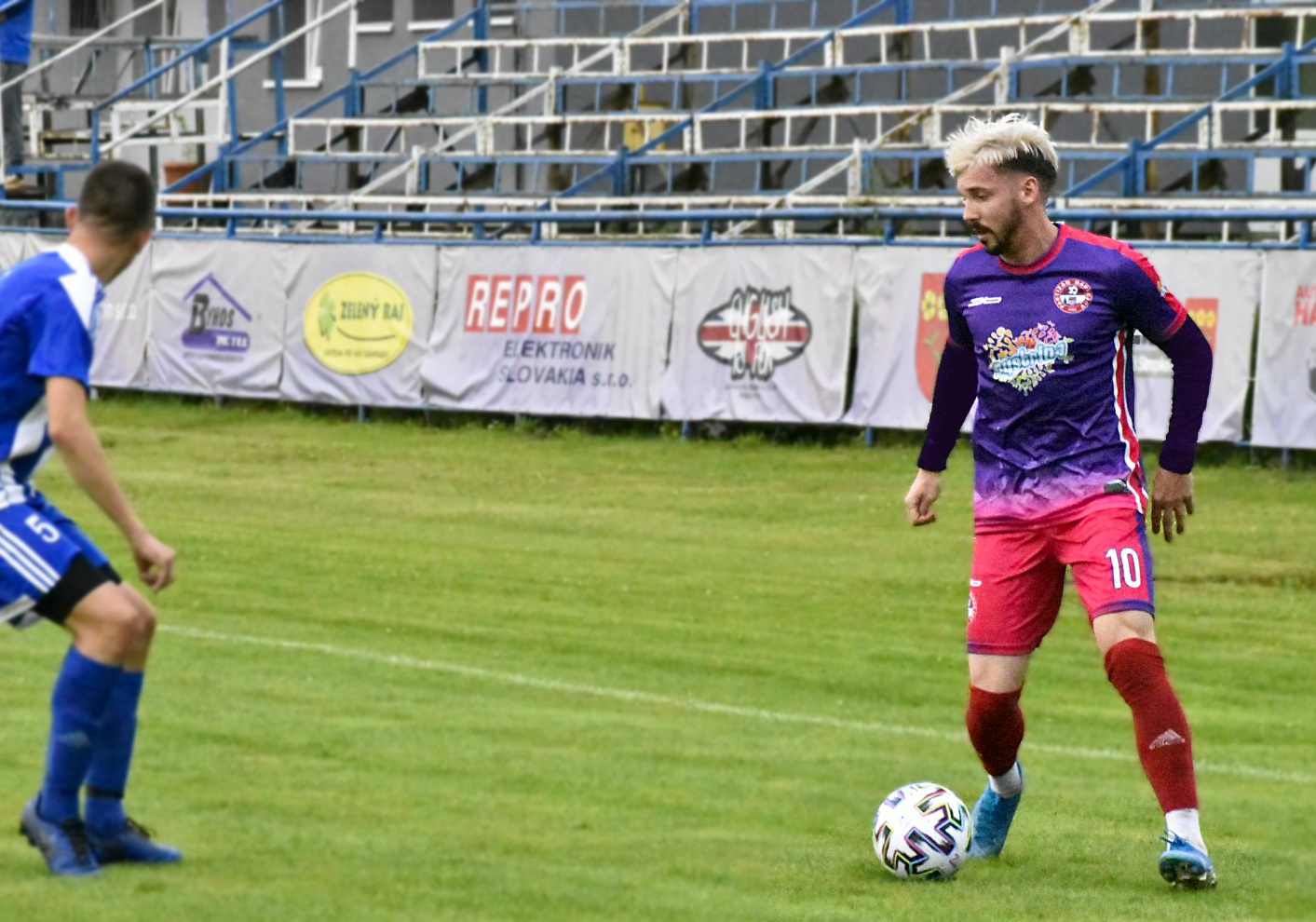
Zaborowski, playing for Partizan Bardejov in June 2020

=== ACS Viitorul Târgu Jiu ===
After a successful season in Greece, despite offers in Greece, Lithuania and Cyprus, Zaborowski joined Liga II side Viitorul Târgu Jiu on 5 September 2019.

=== Partizán Bardejov ===
On 21 February, after picking up an injury at Viitorul and deciding to move closer to his family, Zaborowski signed with 2. liga club Partizán Bardejov on 21 February 2020. Due to the season being suspended and eventually cancelled because of the lockdown in Slovakia, Zaborowski played only one game for his new club, in which he made an assist and was chosen as the best player of his team.

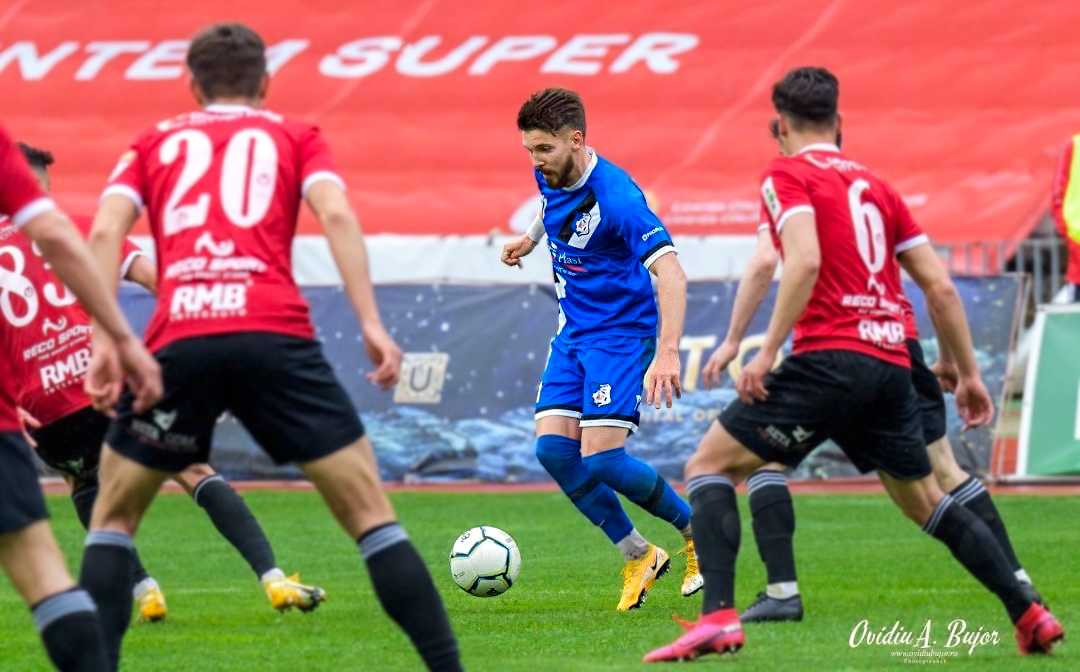
Zaborowski against FC Universitatea Cluj in 2021 Romanian Liga II at Cluj Arena.

=== CS Pandurii Târgu Jiu ===
Despite offers from Slovakia, Greece and Cyprus in summer 2020, Zaborowski made his return to Romania after signing a one-year contract with Liga II side Pandurii Târgu Jiu.

=== Swadhinata Krira Sangha ===
On 24 November 2021, Zaborowski joined Bangladesh Premier League side Swadhinata Krira Sangha on a one-year deal. He made his debut and his first assist for the club in a 2–1 Independence Cup loss against Dhaka Abahani. In an important game for promotion to the next round, against Rahmatganj MFS, Zaborowski performed well by scoring two goals in a 3–2 win, securing promotion for Swadhinata to the quarter-finals. In the club's debut match in the Premier League against the defending champions and 2022 AFC Cup participants Bashundhara Kings, Zaborowski won a penalty which led to a 1–0 win for Swadhinata. Zaborowski received Man of the Match honours for his performance in a loss against Bangladesh Police FC, during which he scored and assisted once.

=== Aizawl ===
In October 2023, Zaborowski signed with Indian I-League club Aizawl.

=== Szczakowianka Jaworzno ===
On 29 August 2024, Zaborowski returned to Poland to join Polish sixth-tier club Szczakowianka Jaworzno.

== Honours ==
Ruch Radzionków

- IV liga Silesia I: 2014–15
