= Ivan Marić (footballer, born 1994) =

Serbian footballer (born 1994)

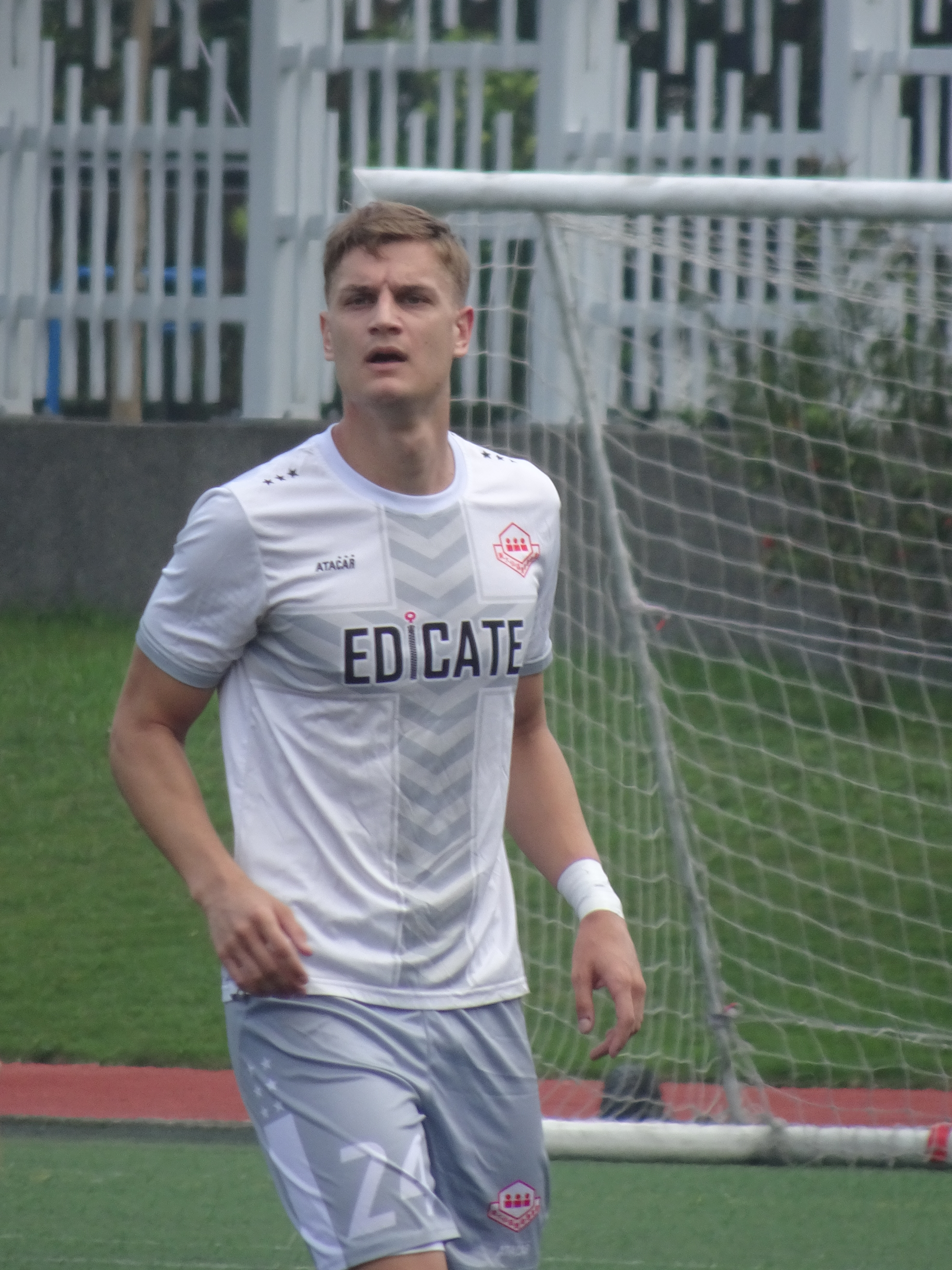
- Marić with Wong Tai Sin in 2019

Personal information
- Date of birth: 3 August 1994 (age 32)
- Place of birth: Čačak, FR Yugoslavia
- Height: 1.91 m (6 ft 3 in)
- Positions: Centre-back; defensive midfielder

Youth career
- Borac Čačak

Senior career*
Years	Team	Apps	(Gls)
2012–2013	Sloboda Čačak	0	(0)
2013–2014	Zvezdara		
2014	Polet Ljubić	0	(0)
2015	Sloga Kraljevo	10	(0)
2015–2016	Jedinstvo Bijelo Polje	20	(0)
2016	Lokomotíva Zvolen	3	(0)
2017	Jagodina	12	(0)
2017–2018	Mosta	19	(1)
2018–2019	Wong Tai Sin	12	(3)
2019–2020	King Fung	10	(4)
2021	Valletta	4	(0)
2022	SHB Da Nang	1	(0)
2022–2023	Swadhinata KS	8	(2)
2023	Satdobato	13	(0)
2023–2024	Aizawl	17	(0)
2024–2025	Adhyaksa	18	(1)
2025	Persiku Kudus	6	(0)

International career
2010	Serbia U17	4	(0)
- * Club domestic league appearances and goals as of 10:00, 23 November 2025 (UTC)

Ivan Marić (Serbian Cyrillic: Иван Марић; born 3 August 1994) is a Serbian professional footballer who plays as a centre-back or defensive midfielder.

== Club career ==
=== Early years ===
Born in Čačak, Marić came through the youth academy of his local side Borac Čačak. He later moved to another local club Sloboda Čačak. In the 2013–14 season, he played for Zvezdara in the Belgrade Zone League.

=== Professional career ===
In early 2015, as a young prospect at the age of 20, Marić moved up two tiers to join Serbian First League club Sloga Kraljevo. He would make 10 appearances up to the end of 2014–15 season. After the season, Marić moved abroad to pursue a trial at Macedonian side Mladost Carev Dvor.

After spending the 2015–16 season with Jedinstvo Bijelo Polje in the Montenegrin Second League, Marić moved to Lokomotíva Zvolen, with which he stayed until the end of 2016.

In March 2017, now a professional with foreign experience, Marić returned to his home country Serbia's First League, signing with Jagodina. That summer, Marić took his experience abroad to the Maltese Premier League, joining Mosta.

==== Asia ====
In the 2018–19 season, Marić took a leap away from his home continent. Playing in the Hong Kong First Division, he was a registered foreign player for Wong Tai Sin, alongside veteran compatriot Ivan Kurtušić.

In the 2019–20 season, he was invited to join King Fung in the same division. His performances for the club received positive comments from the media, as he went on the scoresheet 4 times despite the season having been shortened by the pandemic.

==== Back to Europe ====
In January 2021, Marić became Valletta's defender in the final hours of the January transfer window, as the club's intention was to replace Serbian defender Mihailo Jovanovic, who left the club to return to his homeland on account of family mourning. He left the club again at the end of the season.

=== Return to Asia ===
After a trial period, Marić returned to Asia, when he signed with V.League 1 club SHB Da Nang FC on 30 December 2021.

On 21 April 2022, Marić signed for Bangladesh Premier League side Swadhinata KS during the mid season transfer window.

In September 2023, Marić moved to India, signing I-League club Aizawl.

== Career statistics ==
=== Club ===
As of 21 January 2018

Appearances and goals by club, season and competition
Club	Season	League			Cup		Continental		Other		Total	
Club	Season	Division	Apps	Goals	Apps	Goals	Apps	Goals	Apps	Goals	Apps	Goals
Sloga Kraljevo	2014–15	Serbian First League	10	0	—		—		—		10	0
Jedinstvo Bijelo Polje	2015–16	Montenegrin Second League	20	0	3	0	—		—		23	0
Lokomotíva Zvolen	2016–17	2. Liga (Slovakia)	3	0	1	0	—		—		4	0
Jagodina	2016–17	Serbian First League	8	0	—		—		—		8	0
Mosta	2017–18	Maltese Premier League	12	1	1	0	—		—		13	1
Career total			53	1	5	0	0	0	0	0	58	1

== Honours ==
Jedinstvo Bijelo Polje

- Montenegrin Second League: 2015–16
