= Yeamin Ahmed Chowdhury Munna =

Bangladeshi footballer

Yeamin Munna
Personal information
- Full name: Yeamin Ahmed Chowdhury Munna
- Date of birth: 2 August 1991 (age 35)
- Place of birth: Sylhet, Bangladesh
- Height: 1.71 m (5 ft 7 in)
- Positions: Left back; center back

Senior career*
Years	Team	Apps	(Gls)
2005–2006	Jurain Janata Club		
2006–2007	Wari Club		
2009–2010	Mohammedan SC		
2011–2012	Muktijoddha Sangsad		
2012–2013	Sheikh Russel KC		
2014–2017	Sheikh Jamal DC		
2017–2019	Dhaka Abahani	1	(0)
2019–2020	Sheikh Russel KC	51	(0)
2021–2022	Muktijoddha Sangsad	22	(0)
2022–2023	Sheikh Jamal DC	1	(0)

International career^{‡}
2010–2016	Bangladesh	14	(0)
- * Club domestic league appearances and goals as of 9 December 2022 ‡ National team caps and goals as of 15 January 2016

Yeamin Munna (Bengali: ইয়ামিন মুন্না; born 2 August 1991) is a retired Bangladeshi professional footballer who played as a defender. He represented the Bangladesh national team from 2011 to 2016.
