= Nedo Turković =

Bosnian footballer

Personal information
- Date of birth: 23 October 1989 (age 37)
- Place of birth: Sarajevo, SFR Yugoslavia
- Height: 1.91 m (6 ft 3 in)
- Position: Forward

Senior career*
Years	Team	Apps	(Gls)
–2009	Željezničar Sarajevo	0	(0)
2009–2011	Napredak		
2011–2012	Travnik	2	(0)
2012–2013	Lovćen	24	(4)
2013	Travnik	15	(5)
2013–2014	Akzhayik	11	(2)
2014	Shuvalan	17	(4)
2014–2016	Željezničar Sarajevo	16	(2)
2016–2017	Olimpik Sarajevo	5	(0)
2017	Brežice	10	(9)
2017–2018	NEROCA	12	(2)
2018–2019	Qormi	3	(0)
2019–2020	Turris Turnu Măgurele	11	(1)
2020	Argeș Pitești	2	(0)
2020–2021	Al-Taqadom	13	(3)
2021	Al-Diwaniya	10	(4)
2021	Swadhinata KS	11	(4)
2022	Dhaka Abahani	0	(0)
- * Club domestic league appearances and goals as of 21 April 2022

Nedo Turković (born 23 October 1989) is a former Bosnian professional footballer who played as a forward. He is currently a football comentator and streamer.

== Club career ==
In his career, Turković played for FK Željezničar Sarajevo, NK Napredak, NK Travnik, FK Lovćen, FC Akzhayik in Kazakhstan, Shuvalan FK in Azerbaijan, FK Olimpik Sarajevo, NK Brežice 1919 in Slovenia, NEROCA F.C. in India and Qormi F.C. in Malta. F.C.Turris Turnu Magurele and ASC FC Arges Pitesti in Romania. Saudi Arabia team F.C.Al-Taqadum..

Current team is F.C. Al- Diwaniyah Iraq.

=== NEROCA ===
Signing for NEROCA of the Indian I-League in December 2017, and making his debut in a 1–0 win over Lajong, Turković claimed he earned a higher salary there than when he played in Europe, adding that the prices in India were not extortionate as well with the club providing everything he needed. He left Neroca in October 2018.

=== Qormi ===
On 26 October 2018, Turković signed with Maltese Premier League club Qormi F.C. On 3 January 2019, Turković left Qormi after playing only 3 league games for the club.

=== Turris Turnu Mgurele ===
On 18 July 2019, Turković signed a contract with Romanian Liga II side Turris-Oltul Turnu Măgurele.

=== Swadhinata KS ===
On 19 November 2021, Turković joined Bangladesh Premier League club Swadhinata KS

=== Abahani Limited Dhaka ===
On 7 April 2022, fellow Bengali side Abahani Limited Dhaka signed Turkovic in preparation for the 2022 AFC Cup.
