= Aboubacar Camara (footballer, born 1998) =

Guinean footballer

Personal information
- Date of birth: 10 July 1998 (age 28)
- Position: Forward

Team information
- Current team: Ashanti GB

Senior career*
Years	Team	Apps	(Gls)
2015–2017	Renaissance FC		
2019–2021	Hafia FC		
2021–	Ashanti GB		

International career^{‡}
2018–	Guinea	3	(0)
- * Club domestic league appearances and goals as of 19:47, 16 April 2026 (UTC) ‡ National team caps and goals as of 5 November 2019

Aboubacar Camara (born 10 July 1998) is a Guinean football striker for Ashanti GB.
