= Obidur Rahman Nawbab =

Bangladeshi footballer

Obaidur Rahman Nawbab
Personal information
- Full name: Obaidur Rahman Nawbab
- Date of birth: 18 December 1998 (age 27)
- Place of birth: Feni, Bangladesh
- Positions: Attacking midfielder; left winger

Youth career
- 2016–2019: Aspire Academy
- 2019–2020: Al-Duhail

Senior career*
Years	Team	Apps	(Gls)
2020–2021	Al-Duhail	0	(0)
2021–2022	Bashundhara Kings	6	(0)
2022	→ Muktijoddha Sangsad (loan)	10	(3)
2022–2023	Sheikh Jamal Dhanmondi	14	(1)
2023–2025	Lusail	11	(1)
2025–	Al Rumailah		
- * Club domestic league appearances and goals as of 29 May 2026

Obaidur Rahman Nawbab (Bengali: ওবায়দুর রহমান নবাব; born 18 December 1998) is a Bangladeshi footballer who plays as a winger. He can also be deployed as an attacking midfielder or central midfielder.

== Early career ==
Nawbab was groomed in the Aspire Academy of Qatar. He was later recruited for the Qatar U-19 team before joining Al-Duhail for the Qatar Stars League.

== International career ==
Nawbab is eligible to represent Bangladesh. In 2021, he received his preliminary squad call-up for a Four Nation Invitational Tournament in Sri Lanka.
