= 2022–23 Muktijoddha Sangsad KC season =

Muktijoddha Sangsad KC
2022–23 season
- President: Zahurul Islam Rhohel
- Head coach: Raja Isa
- Stadium: Sheikh Fazlul Haque Mani Stadium
- Bangladesh Premier League: 10th of 11
- Federation Cup: Quarter-finals
- Independence Cup: Quarter-finals
- Top goalscorer: League: Emmanuel Uzochukwu (7 goals); All: Emmanuel Uzochukwu (14 goals)
- Biggest win: 5–1 Vs Bangladesh Air Force (15 November 2022)
- Biggest defeat: 4–5 Vs Bangladesh Police FC (27 November 2022)
Home colours	Away colours	Third colours

The 2022–23 Muktijoddha Sangsad KC's season was the club's 39th competitive highest level season, since their promotion from the Dhaka Second Division League in 1982. In addition to domestic league, the club was participated on this season's edition of Federation Cup and Independence Cup. The season are covered period from 8 October 2022– 22 July 2023.

== Current squad ==
Muktijoddha Sangsad KC squad for 2022–23 season.

As of 27 March 2023

Note: Flags indicate national team as defined under FIFA eligibility rules; some limited exceptions apply. Players may hold more than one non-FIFA nationality.

No.	Pos.	Nation	Player
1	GK	BAN	Monirul Islam
3	DF	NGR	Adeyinka Najeem
5	DF	BAN	Mohamed Salauddin
6	MF	BAN	Fazlay Rabbi
7	MF	BAN	Aminur Rahman Sajib (captain)
8	MF	JPN	Soma Otani
9	FW	BDI	Landry Ndikumana
10	FW	NGR	Emmanuel Uzochukwu
11	MF	BAN	Rubel Miya
12	MF	BAN	Md Roman
13	DF	BAN	Sagor Sarkar
15	MF	BAN	Md Taj Uddin
16	DF	BAN	Rashedul Islam Rashed
17	MF	BAN	Nadim Mahmud Limon
19	MF	BAN	Mezbah Uddin
20	DF	ZIM	Jimmy Dzingai
21	DF	BAN	Amit Hasan
22	GK	BAN	Mojnu Miah
23	FW	BAN	Manzurul Karim
24	DF	BAN	Alfaz Miah

No.	Pos.	Nation	Player
25	GK	BAN	Rakib Hossain Mridha
27	MF	BAN	Abu Bokor
30	GK	BAN	Mehedi Hasan Srabon
31	MF	BAN	Md Shakil Kishur
32	DF	BAN	Mahadud Hossain Fahim
42	DF	BAN	Samuel Elhaz Hudson
44	MF	BAN	Suibor Rahman Mijan
45	MF	BAN	Shaid Rakib Khan Evan
52	DF	BAN	Nikson Chakma
55	DF	BAN	Nazim Uddin Mithu
66	DF	BAN	Sumon Ahmed
72	DF	BAN	Mohamed Atikuzzaman (on loan from Bashundhara Kings)
75	FW	BAN	Riaj Uddin Sagor
77	FW	BAN	Golam Rabby
88	MF	BAN	Mahdi Khan

== Pre-season friendly ==
3 November 2022	Fortis FC	0–0	Muktijoddha Sangsad KC	Badda, Dhaka
19:00 UTC+6		Report		Stadium: Frotis Sports Ground

== Transfer ==
=== In ===
No.	Pos	Player	Previous club	Fee	Date	Source
	FW	(Bangladesh) Naymul Talukdar	(Bangladesh) Muktijoddha Sangsad KC U-18	Promoted	25 October 2022	
	MF	(Bangladesh) Mahdi Khan	(Bangladesh) Bashundhara Kings	Free	25 October 2022	
	DF	(Bangladesh) Md Aminul Islam	(Bangladesh) Muktijoddha Sangsad KC U-18	Promoted	26 October 2022	
55	DF	(Bangladesh) Nazim Uddin Mithu	(Bangladesh) Chittagong Abahani	Free	27 October 2022	
5	DF	(Bangladesh) Mohammad Salauddin	(Bangladesh) Fortis FC	Free	27 October 2022	
14	DF	(Bangladesh) Emon Khan	(Bangladesh) Mohammedan SC	Free	27 October 2022	
15	MF	(Bangladesh) Md Taj Uddin	(Bangladesh) Saif Sporting Club	Free	28 October 2022	
6	MF	(Bangladesh) Fazlay Rabbi	(Bangladesh) Rahmatganj MFS	Free	28 October 2022	
1	GK	(Bangladesh) Monirul Islam Tuhin	(Bangladesh) Saif Sporting Club	Free	30 October 2022	
3	DF	(Nigeria) Adeyinka Najeem	(Nigeria) Niger Tornadoes	Free	30 October 2022	
20	DF	(Zimbabwe) Jimmy Dzingai	(Namibia) Nkana F.C.	Free	30 October 2022	
21	DF	(Bangladesh) Amit Hasan	(Bangladesh) Chittagong Abahani	Free	1 November 2022	
99	FW	(Bangladesh) Faisal Ahmed Shitol	Bangladesh Police FC	Free	1 November 2022	
25	GK	(Bangladesh) Rakib Hossain Mridha	(Bangladesh) Mohammedan SC	Free	3 November 2022	
16	DF	(Bangladesh) Rashedul Islam Rashed	(Bangladesh) Sheikh Russel KC	Free	3 November 2022	
10	FW	(Nigeria) Emmanuel Uzochukwu	(Lebanon) Nejmeh SC	Free	6 November 2022	
9	FW	(Burundi) Landry Ndikumana	(Rwanda) AS Kigali FC	Free	6 November 2022	
13	DF	(Bangladesh) Sagor Sarkar	(Bangladesh) Mohammedan SC	Free	9 November 2022	
19	MF	(Bangladesh) Mezabah Uddin	(Bangladesh) Rahmatganj MFS	Free	9 November 2022	
27	MF	(Bangladesh) Abu Bokor	(Bangladesh) Swadhinata KS	Free	11 November 2022	
24	DF	(Bangladesh) Alfaj Miah	(Bangladesh) Kadamtola Sangsad KC	Free	11 November 2022	
30	GK	(Bangladesh) Mehedi Hasan Srabon	(Bangladesh) Bashundhara Kings U18	Free	November 2022	
18	MF	(Bangladesh) Tuhidul Islam Ridoy	(Bangladesh) Bashundhara Kings	Loan	November 2022	
11	MF	(Bangladesh) Rubel Miya	(Bangladesh) Chittagong Abahani Limited	Free	November 2022	
77	DF	(Bangladesh) Rabby Bhuyia	(Bangladesh) Uttara FC	Free	November 2022	
4	DF	(Bangladesh) Saidul Haque	(Bangladesh) Uttar Baridhara	Free	November 2022	
2	DF	(Bangladesh) Kesto Kumar Bose	(Bangladesh) Bashundhara Kings	Free	November 2022	
80	FW	(Bangladesh) Bishal Das	(Bangladesh) Swadhinata KS	Free	November 2022	
17	MF	(Bangladesh) Nadim Mahmud Limon	(Bangladesh) Rahmatganj MFS	Free	November 2022	
–	MF	(Bangladesh) Samuel Hudson	Unattached	Free	16 March 2023	

=== Out ===
No.	Pos	Player	Moved to	Fee	Date	Source
26	DF	(Bangladesh) Mehedi Hasan Mithu	(Bangladesh) Bashundhara Kings	End of load	31 August 2022	
27	MF	(Bangladesh) Obidur Rahman Nawbab	(Bangladesh) Bashundhara Kings	End of load	31 August 2022	
	DF	(Bangladesh) Joyonto Lal	(Bangladesh) Bashundhara Kings	End of load	31 August 2022	
2	DF	(Bangladesh) Khalil Bhuiya	(Bangladesh) Sheikh Jamal DC	Free	4 August 2022	
55	DF	(Bangladesh) Yeamin Munna	(Bangladesh) Sheikh Jamal DC	Free	4 September 2022	
3	DF	(Bangladesh) Md Tareq Miah	(Bangladesh) Sheikh Jamal DC	Free	6 September 2022	
70	FW	(Burundi) Sudi Abdallah	(Iraq) Al-Naft SC	Not disclosed	16 September 2022	
15	FW	(Bangladesh) Sarower Zaman Nipu	(Bangladesh) AFC Uttara	Free	19 October 2022	
1	GK	(Bangladesh) Mamun Khan	Unattached	Released	22 October 2022	
9	FW	(Japan) Tetsuaki Misawa	(India) Sudeva FC	Free	29 October 2022	
25	GK	(Bangladesh) Maksudur Rahman Mostak	(Bangladesh) Mohammedan SC	Free	3 November 2022	
22	GK	(Bangladesh) Mohamed Razib	(Bangladesh) AFC Uttara	Free	5 November 2022	
17	MF	(Bangladesh) Mohiudeen Mahi	(Bangladesh) Sheikh Russel KC	Free	7 November 2022	
11	MF	(Bangladesh) Sohel Rana	(Bangladesh) AFC Uttara	Free	7 November 2022	
14	MF	(Bangladesh) Salauddin Rubel	(Bangladesh) AFC Uttara	Free	7 November 2022	
16	MF	(Bangladesh) Istekharul Alam Shakil	(Bangladesh) AFC Uttara	Free	7 November 2022	
12	DF	(Bangladesh) Sajon Mia	(Bangladesh) Fortis FC	Free	7 November 2022	
29	FW	(Bangladesh) Muhammad Iqbal	Unattached	Released	7 November 2022	
23	MF	(Bangladesh) Mohamed Elias	Unattached	Released	7 November 2022	
28	MF	(Bangladesh) Shuvo Raj Bongshi	Unattached	Released	7 November 2022	
33	DF	(Bangladesh) Rifath Hossain	Unattached	Released	7 November 2022	
20	MF	(Bangladesh) Md Nayeemuddin	Unattached	Released	7 November 2022	
18	MF	(Bangladesh) Somriddha Nokrek	Unattached	Released	7 November 2022	
36	GK	(Bangladesh) Limon Hosen	Unattached	Released	7 November 2022	
77	MF	(Bangladesh) Rohit Sarkar	(Bangladesh) AFC Uttara	Free	7 November 2022	
21	MF	(Bangladesh) Mohammad Abdullah Tofel	(Bangladesh) AFC Uttara	Free	7 November 2022	
6	MF	(Bangladesh) Tariqul Islam	(Bangladesh) Fortis FC	Free	7 November 2022	

== Competitions ==
Win Draw Loss Fixtures

=== Overall ===
Competition	First match	Last match	Final Position
BPL	10 December 2022	22 July 2023	10th
Federation Cup	27 December 2022	4 April 2023	Quarter-finals
Independence Cup	15 November 2022	27 November 2022	Quarter-finals

=== Overview ===
Competition	Record							
Competition	Pld	W	D	L	GF	GA	GD	Win %
BPL	20	4	3	13	19	42	−23	20.00
Independence Cup	4	2	0	2	13	9	+4	50.00
Federation Cup	4	1	0	3	6	9	−3	25.00
Total	28	7	3	18	38	60	−22	25.00

Source: Competitions

=== Premier League ===
==== League table ====
Pos	Team	Pld	W	D	L	GF	GA	GD	Pts	Qualification or relegation
7	Fortis FC	20	5	8	7	23	25	−2	23	
8	Chittagong Abahani	20	4	9	7	26	35	−9	21	
9	Rahmatganj MFS	20	4	7	9	15	31	−16	19	
10	Muktijoddha Sangsad KC (R)	20	4	3	13	19	42	−23	15	Relegation to Championship League
11	AFC Uttara (R)	20	0	5	15	10	56	−46	5	Relegation to Championship League

Source: Soccerway
Rules for classification: 1) Points; 2) Goal difference; 3) Goals scored.
(R) Relegated

==== Results summary ====
Overall								Home						Away					
Pld	W	D	L	GF	GA	GD	Pts	W	D	L	GF	GA	GD	W	D	L	GF	GA	GD
20	4	3	13	19	42	−23	15	2	2	6	10	19	−9	2	1	7	9	23	−14

Source: Soccerway

==== Results by round ====
Round	1	2	3	4	5	6	7	8	9	10	11	12	13	14	15	16	17	18	19	20	21	22
Ground	A	H	A	H	A	H	A	(Note: No Muktijoddha Sangsad KC matchday in this round.)	H	A	H	H	A	H	A	H	A	H	(Note: No Muktijoddha Sangsad KC matchday in this round.)	A	H	A
Result	L	L	L	L	W	D	W	–	L	L	W	L	L	W	L	D	L	L	–	L	L	L
Position	10	10	11	11	9	6	7	7	9	9	8	8	8	8	8	8	8	10	10	10	10	10

Source: Matches
A = Away; H = Home; W = Win; D = Draw; L = Loss; P = Postponed

=== Matches ===
10 December 2022 1	Dhaka Mohammedan	2–0	Muktijoddha Sangsad KC	Comilla
14:30 BST (UTC+6)	Febles 51'; Diabate 86' (pen.)	Report	Sagor Sarker (yellow card) 29'; Mohammed Rashedul Islam Rashed (yellow card) 29'	Stadium: Shaheed Dhirendranath Datta Stadium; Referee: Golam Mourshed Chowdhury Nayan

23 December 2023 2	Muktijoddha Sangsad KC	2–3	Sheikh Jamal DC	Gopalganj
14:30 BST (UTC+6)	Adeyinka Najeem 44'; Soma Otani 90+4'	Report	Stewart 32', 90+3'; Kawshik Barua 64'; Otabek Valizhonov (yellow card) 87'	Stadium: Sheikh Fazlul Haque Mani Stadium; Referee: Golam Mourshed Chowdhury Nayan

30 December 2022 3	Dhaka Abahani	3–2	Muktijoddha Sangsad KC	Comilla
14:30 BST (UTC+6)	Colindres 39'; Maraz (yellow card) 55'; Rahmat (yellow card) 77'; Eleta 80'; Jibon 90+3'	Report	Ndikumana 3', 46'; Adeyinka Najeem (yellow card) 82'	Stadium: Shaheed Dhirendranath Datta Stadium; Referee: Mahmud Zamal Farouqee Nahid

6 January 2023 4	Muktijoddha Sangsad KC	1–3	Bashundhara Kings	Gopalganj
14:45 BST (UTC+6)	Ndikumana 10'; Mohammad Roman (yellow card) 24'	Report	Dorielton 35', 45+2'; Motin 88'	Stadium: Sheikh Fazlul Haque Mani Stadium; Referee: Mohan Bhaban

13 January 2023 5	AFC Uttara	0–1	Muktijoddha Sangsad KC	Mymensingh
14:45 BST (UTC+6)	Jabed Ahmed (yellow card) 46'	Report	Adeyinka Najeem 59'; Mohammad Rashedul Islam Rashed (yellow card) 64'; Sajib (yellow card) 90+1'	Stadium: Rafiq Uddin Bhuiyan Stadium; Referee: Sabuj Das

21 January 2023 6	Muktijoddha Sangsad KC	1–1	Fortis FC	Gopalganj
15:00 BST (UTC+6)	Md Roman (yellow card) 18'; Taj 38'; Ndikumana (yellow card) 81'; Sagor Sarkar (yellow card) 86'	Report	Dinilo 64'	Stadium: Sheikh Fazlul Haque Mani Stadium; Referee: Mahmud Zamal Farouqee Nahid

27 January 2023 7	Rahmatganj MFS	0–2	Muktijoddha Sangsad KC	Munshigonj
15:00 BST (UTC+6)	Shokhrukhbek Kholmatov (yellow card) 16'; Mohamed Tanvir Hossain (yellow card) 79'	Report	Sajib 45+2'; Ndikumana 54'; Emmanuel (yellow card) 80'	Stadium: Shaheed Bir Sreshtho Flight Lt. Matiur Rahman Stadium; Referee: Mohammad Jalal Uddin

11 February 2023 9	Muktijoddha Sangsad KC	0–1	Bangladesh Police FC	Gopalganj
15:45 BST (UTC+6)		Report	Monaem (yellow card) 53'; Edward Enrique Morillo Jimenéz 78'	Stadium: Sheikh Fazlul Haque Mani Stadium; Referee: Bituraj Barua

18 February 2023 10	Chittagong Abahani	1–0	Muktijoddha Sangsad KC	Munshigonj
15:45 BST (UTC+6)	Pulatov 33'; Emtiyaz Raihan (yellow card) 54' (goal) 67'	Report	Rashedul Islam Rashed (yellow card) 45+2'; Soma Otani (yellow card) 50'; Adeyinka Najeem (yellow card) 86'	Stadium: Shaheed Bir Sreshtho Flight Lt. Matiur Rahman Stadium; Referee: Jasim Akther

25 February 2023 11	Muktijoddha Sangsad KC	1–0	Sheikh Russel KC	Gopalganj
15:45 BST (UTC+6)	Alfaz Miah (yellow card) 55'; Sajib 62'	Report	Hemanta (yellow card) 45+2'	Stadium: Sheikh Fazlul Haque Mani Stadium; Referee: Md Jalaluddin

8 April 2023 12	Muktijoddha Sangsad KC	1–6	Dhaka Mohammedan	Gopalganj
15:45 BST (UTC+6)	Mohamed Atikuzzaman 8' (yellow card) 35'; Dzingai (yellow card) 45+4'; Mahadud Hossain Fahim (yellow card) 52'	Report	Diabate 22', 37', 54' (pen.); Muzaffar Muzaffarov 42'; Emmanuel 69'; Shahed Hossain 84'	Stadium: Sheikh Fazlul Haque Mani Stadium; Referee: Md Jalal Uddin

14 April 2023 13	Sheikh Jamal DC	1–1	Muktijoddha Sangsad KC	Gopalganj
15:45 BST (UTC+6)	Obidur (yellow card) 7'; Nodir Mavlonov (yellow card) 21'; Otabek Valizhonov 41'; Raihan (yellow card) 90'	Report	Uzochukwu 90+6' (pen.)	Stadium: Sheikh Fazlul Haque Mani Stadium; Referee: Bituraj Barua

28 April 2023 14	Muktijoddha Sangsad KC	1–0	Dhaka Abahani	Gopalganj
15:45 BST (UTC+6)	Emmanuel 90+8'	Report		Stadium: Sheikh Fazlul Haque Mani Stadium; Referee: Md Jalal Uddin

5 May 2023 15	Bashundhara Kings	4–0	Muktijoddha Sangsad KC	Dhaka
16:00 BST (UTC+6)	Figueira 42', 80'; Dorielton 52', 76'	Report	Alfaj Miah (yellow card) 18'	Stadium: Bashundhara Kings Arena; Referee: Bhubon Mohon Tarafder

13 May 2023 16	Muktijoddha Sangsad KC	1–1	AFC Uttara	Gopalganj
16:00 BST (UTC+6)	Emmanuel 51'	Report	Richard Maturana 16'; Salauddin Rubel (yellow card) 61'; Jabed Ahmed (yellow card) 85'	Stadium: Sheikh Fazlul Haque Mani Stadium; Referee: Golam Murshed Chowdhury Nayon

20 May 2023 17	Fortis FC	2–0	Muktijoddha Sangsad KC	Rajshahi
16:00 BST (UTC+6)	Sharifi 84'; Shahin Ahmed (yellow card) 90'; Mozzammel Hossain Nira 90+3'	Report	Mahadud Hossain Fahim (yellow card) 53'; Sajib (yellow card) 54'	Stadium: Muktijuddho Sriti Stadium; Referee: Md Nasir Uddin

27 May 2023 18	Muktijoddha Sangsad KC	1–2	Rahmatganj MFS	Gopalganj
16:00 BST (UTC+6)	Emmanuel 37'	Report	Peter 26', 65' (pen.)	Stadium: Sheikh Fazlul Haque Mani Stadium; Referee: Bhubon Mohon Tarafder

8 June 2023 20	Bangladesh Police FC	6–1	Muktijoddha Sangsad KC	Mymensingh
16:00 BST (UTC+6)	Edward Morillo 1', 89'; Joyonto Kumar Roy 21'; Arango 64' (yellow card) 71'; Abdullah 70'; Shahed Hossain Miah 90+2'	Report	Uzochukwu 62' (pen.); Mahdud Hossain Fahim (yellow card) 71'	Stadium: Rafiq Uddin Bhuiyan Stadium; Referee: Md Alamgir Sarker

15 July 2023 21	Muktijoddha Sangsad KC	1–2	Chittagong Abahani	Gopalganj
16:00 BST (UTC+6)	Uzochukwu 29'; Rashedul Islam Rashed (yellow card) 30'; Abu Bokor (yellow card) 51'; Sajib (yellow card) 74'; Dzingai (yellow card) 75'	Report	Ojukwu 1'; Anik Hossain 11'; Md Tarek (red card) 25'; Ekbal Hussain (yellow card) 56'; Nasiruddin (yellow card) 90+5'	Stadium: Sheikh Fazlul Haque Mani Stadium; Referee: Md Mizanur Rahman

22 July 2023 22	Sheikh Russel KC	3–2	Muktijoddha Sangsad KC	Dhaka
16:00 BST (UTC+6)	Ikechukwu 4'; Ibrahim 9'; Depok Roy 78'	Report	Uzochukwu 30'; Ndikumana 38'	Stadium: Bashundhara Kings Arena; Referee: Golam Mourshed Chowdhury Nayon

=== Federation Cup ===
==== Group stage ====
Pos	Team	Pld	W	D	L	GF	GA	GD	Pts	Qualification
1	Bashundhara Kings	3	3	0	0	8	3	+5	9	Advance to knockout phase
2	Chittagong Abahani	3	1	1	1	1	2	−1	4	Advance to knockout phase
3	Muktijoddha Sangsad KC	3	1	0	2	5	6	−1	3	Advance to knockout phase
4	Fortis FC	3	0	1	2	1	4	−3	1	

Source: Footystats
Rules for classification: Group stage tiebreakers

27 December 2022	Chittagong Abahani	1–0	Muktijoddha Sangsad KC	Gopalganj
14:30 BST (UTC+6)	Rasel Ahmed (yellow card) 6'; Ojukwu David Ifegwu 90'	Report	Sohel Rana (yellow card) 16'; Sumon Ahmed (yellow card) 75'	Stadium: Sheikh Fazlul Haque Mani Stadium; Referee: Bhubon Mohon Tarafder

17 January 2023	Bashundhara Kings	4–3	Muktijoddha Sangsad KC	Gopalganj
15:00 BST (UTC+6)	Robinho 15'; Asror Gafurov 36'; Sumon (yellow card) 22' (goal) 49'; Dorielton 82'	Report	Saidul Haque (yellow card) 15'; Emmanuel 38', 90' (pen.); Ndikumana 87'	Stadium: Sheikh Fazlul Haque Mani Stadium; Referee: Md Alamgir Sarkar

7 February 2023	Fortis FC	1–2	Muktijoddha Sangsad KC	Munshigonj
15:15 BST (UTC+6)	Tariqul Islam (yellow card) 17'; Prokash Das (yellow card) 65'; Sabuj Hossain 85'	Report	Md Roman (yellow card) 23'; Emmanuel 44'; Ndikumana 90+1'	Stadium: Shaheed Bir Sreshtho Flight Lt. Matiur Rahman Stadium; Referee: Md Nasir Uddin

==== Knockout stages ====
4 April 2023 Quarter-finals	Bashundhara Kings	3–1	Muktijoddha Sangsad KC	Munshigonj
15:15 BST (UTC+6)	Dorielton 42', 79'; Robinho (yellow card) 18' (goal) 81'	Report	Emmanuel 34'; Md Roman (yellow card) 39'; Bishal Das (yellow card) 87'	Stadium: Shaheed Bir Sreshtho Flight Lt. Matiur Rahman Stadium; Referee: Md Anisur Rahman Sagor

=== Independence Cup ===
==== Group stages ====
Pos	Team	Pld	W	D	L	GF	GA	GD	Pts	Qualification
1	Abahani Ltd. Dhaka	3	3	0	0	8	2	+6	9	Advance to Knockout stage
2	Muktijoddha SKC	3	2	0	1	9	4	+5	6	Advance to Knockout stage
3	Bangladesh Air Force	3	1	0	2	4	9	−5	3	
4	Uttara FC	3	0	0	3	1	7	−6	0	

Source: GSA

15 November 2022	Bangladesh Air Force	1–5	Muktijoddha Sangsad KC	Gopalganj
14:00 BST (UTC+6)	Sumon 76'	Report	Rabby 28'; Faisal 44', 90+2'; Sajib 69'; Taj 90+4'	Stadium: Sheikh Fazlul Haque Mani Stadium; Referee: Bhubon Mohon Tarafder

19 November 2022	Muktijoddha Sangsad KC	3–0	Uttara FC	Gopalganj
14:00 BST (UTC+6)	Sajib 8'; Soma 79'; Uzochukwu 83'	Report		Stadium: Sheikh Fazlul Haque Mani Stadium; Referee: Rimon Mahmud

23 November 2022	Muktijoddha Sangsad KC	1–3	Dhaka Abahani	Comilla
13:00 BST (UTC+6)	Emmanuel 51'	Report	Raphael 4', 27'; Getterson 61'	Stadium: Shaheed Dhirendranath Datta Stadium; Referee: Golam Mourshed Chowdhury Nayan

==== Knockout stages ====
27 November 2021 Quarter-finals	Bangladesh Police FC	5–4 (a.e.t.)	Muktijoddha Sangsad KC	Comilla
13:00 BST (UTC+6)	Bablu 16'; Morillo 33'; Malikov 81'; Hernandez 86'; Eshanur 120'	Report	Emmanuel 45'; Ndikuma 55', 70'; Al Amin 90+3' (o.g.)	Stadium: Shaheed Dhirendranath Datta Stadium; Referee: Bituraj Barua

== Statistics ==
=== Goalscorers ===
Rank	Player	Position	Total	BPL	Independence Cup	Federation Cup
1	(Nigeria) Emmanuel Uzochukwu	FW	14	7	3	4
2	(Burundi) Landry Ndikumana	FW	9	5	2	2
3	(Bangladesh) Aminur Rahman Sajib	FW	4	2	2	0
4	(Bangladesh) Md Taj Uddin	MF	2	1	1	0
4	(Japan) Soma Otani	FW	2	1	1	0
4	(Nigeria) Adeyinka Najeem	FW	2	2	0	0
5	(Bangladesh) Sakib Bepari	MF	1	0	1	0
5	(Bangladesh) Faisal Ahmed Shitol	FW	1	0	1	0
5	(Bangladesh) Rabby Bhuiya	DF	1	0	1	0
Own goal			1	0	1	0
Total			38	19	13	6

Source: Matches
