= 2022–23 Fortis FC season =

Fortis FC 2022–23 football season

Fortis FC
2022–23 season
- Owner: Fortis Group
- President: Md Shahin Hasan
- Head coach: Masud Parvez Kaisar
- Stadium: Muktijuddho Sriti Stadium
- Bangladesh Premier League: 7th of 11
- Federation Cup: Group stages
- Independence Cup: Group stages
- Top goalscorer: League: (Afghanistan) Amredin Sharifi (5 goals); All: (Afghanistan) Amredin Sharifi (6 goals)
- Biggest win: 3–1 Vs Bangladesh Navy FC (21 November 2022)
- Biggest defeat: 1–3 Vs Mohammedan SC (17 November 2022)

The 2022–23 season was Fortis FC's 3rd season since its establishment in 2020 and their 1st season in the Bangladesh Premier League. They achieved promotion to the Bangladesh Premier league after being crowned the 2021–22 Bangladesh Championship League title. In addition to domestic league, Fortis FC was participated on this season's edition of Federation Cup and Independence Cup. The season covered the period from 8 October 2022 until 22 July 2023.

== Players ==
As of 28 March 2023

| No. | Player | Nat. | Position(s) | Date of birth | Year signed | Previous club |
Goalkeepers
| 1 | Uttam Barua | (Bangladesh) | GK | 3 June 1988 (age 38) | 2020 | Arambagh KS |
| 22 | Shanto Kumar Roy | (Bangladesh) | GK | 2 September 2003 (age 23) | 2022 | Saif Sporting Club |
| 25 | Azad Hossain | (Bangladesh) | GK | 15 February 1999 (age 27) | 2022 | Chittagong Abahani Limited |
| 30 | Mitul Marma | (Bangladesh) | GK | 11 December 2003 (age 22) | 2022 | Sheikh Jamal Dhanmondi |
Defenders
| 2 | Shahin Ahammad | (Bangladesh) | RB | 15 October 2003 (age 23) | 2022 | Sheikh Jamal Dhanmondi |
| 3 | Ariful Islam Jitu | (Bangladesh) | CB | 15 November 1993 (age 32) | 2022 | Sheikh Jamal Dhanmondi |
| 4 | Danilo Quipapá | (Brazil) | CB | 15 February 1994 (age 32) | 2022 | Bangladesh Police FC |
| 6 | Mojammel Hossain Nira | (Bangladesh) | RB | 15 October 1998 (age 28) | 2022 | Sheikh Jamal Dhanmondi |
| 13 | Joynal Abedin Dipu | (Bangladesh) | LB | 12 December 2001 (age 24) | 2022 | Swadhinata KS |
| 44 | Sabuz Hossain | (Bangladesh) | CB | 23 July 2002 (age 24) | 2022 | Saif Sporting Club |
| 66 | Abdullah Omar Sajib | (Bangladesh) | CB | 17 October 1994 (age 32) | 2020 | |
Midfielders
| 8 | Mamunul Islam | (Bangladesh) | CM | 12 December 1988 (age 37) | 2022 | Rahmatganj MFS |
| 16 | Shahidul Islam Sumon | (Bangladesh) | DM/CM | 7 June 2004 (age 22) | 2021 | BKSP |
| 17 | Mojibur Rahman Jony | (Bangladesh) | DM/CM | 1 January 2005 (age 21) | 2022 | Gopalganj SC |
| 19 | Tariqul Islam | (Bangladesh) | CM | 19 November 2001 (age 24) | 2022 | Muktijoddha Sangsad KC |
| 20 | Mazharul Islam Sourav | (Bangladesh) | DM | 1 January 1990 (age 36) | 2022 | Sheikh Jamal Dhanmondi |
| 23 | Didarul Alam | (Bangladesh) | AM/LM | 5 January 1996 (age 30) | 2022 | Muktijoddha Sangsad KC |
| 88 | Mostajeb Khan | (Bangladesh) | CM | 4 April 2000 (age 26) | 2020 | Chittagong Abahani Limited |
Forwards
| 7 | Kawser Ali Rabbi | (Bangladesh) | LW | 8 August 1996 (age 30) | 2022 | Saif SC |
| 9 | Amredin Sharifi | (Afghanistan) | CF | 23 March 1992 (age 34) | 2022 | Bangladesh Police FC |
| 11 | Shakhawat Hossain Rony | (Bangladesh) | CF | 8 October 1991 (age 35) | 2022 | Chittagong Abahani Limited |
| 15 | Jabed Khan | (Bangladesh) | LW | 25 January 1995 (age 31) | 2022 | Sheikh Jamal Dhanmondi |
| 18 | Md Rafiqul Islam | (Bangladesh) | RW | 12 February 2004 (age 22) | 2022 | NoFeL SC |
| 21 | Mohammed Jahedul Alam | (Bangladesh) | RW | 18 November 1993 (age 32) | 2022 | Swadhinata KS |
| 27 | Borhan Uddin | (Bangladesh) | RW | 1 May 2001 (age 25) | 2020 | Tongi Krira Chakra |
| 70 | Pa Omar Babou | (The Gambia) | FW | 1 October 1998 (age 28) | 2023 | (Morocco) SCC Mohammédia |
| 77 | Garcia Joof | (The Gambia) | FW | 13 December 1998 (age 27) | 2023 | (Israel) Hapoel Umm al-Fahm F.C. |
Left during the season
| 5 | Thiago Bonafim | (Brazil) | DM | 12 July 1992 (age 34) | 2022 | (Malta) Żejtun C. |
| 10 | Luiz Júnior | (Brazil) | CF | 23 April 1990 (age 36) | 2022 | (El Salvador) C.D. Águila |
| 12 | Sajon Mia | (Bangladesh) | RB | 1 January 1996 (age 30) | 2022 | Muktijoddha Sangsad KC |
| 14 | Shahadat Hossain | (Bangladesh) | CM | 15 August 1994 (age 32) | 2020 | |
| 24 | Prokash Das | (Bangladesh) | CB/RB/LB | 17 May 2003 (age 23) | 2021 | Brothers Union |
| 26 | Mohamed Didarul Islam | (Bangladesh) | CF | 18 April 1989 (age 37) | 2022 | Sheikh Russel KC |

== Pre-season friendly ==
| 3 November 2022 | Fortis FC | 0–0 | Muktijoddha Sangsad KC | Badda, Dhaka |
| 19:00 UTC+6 | | Report | | Stadium: Frotis Sports Ground |

| 9 November 2022 | Fortis FC | 1–1 | Chittagong Abahani Limited | Badda, Dhaka |
| 19:00 UTC+6 | | | | Stadium: Frotis Sports Ground |

== Transfers ==
=== Transfers in ===
| Date | Position | No. | Player | From | Fee | Source |
|---|---|---|---|---|---|---|
| 4 August 2022 | DF | 4 | (Brazil) Danilo Quipapá | Bangladesh Police FC | Free | |
| 7 August 2022 | FW | 11 | Shakhawat Rony | Chittagong Abahani Limited | Free | |
| 7 August 2022 | MF | 8 | Mamunul Islam | Rahmatganj MFS | Free | |
| 7 August 2022 | DF | 6 | Mojammel Hossain Nira | Sheikh Jamal Dhanmondi | Free | |
| 7 August 2022 | GK | 30 | Mitul Marma | Sheikh Jamal Dhanmondi | Free | |
| 9 August 2022 | DF | 44 | Sabuz Hossain | Saif Sporting Club | Free | |
| 9 August 2022 | FW | 7 | Kawsar Ali Rabbi | Saif Sporting Club | Free | |
| 10 August 2022 | DF | 2 | Shahin Ahammad | Sheikh Jamal Dhanmondi | Free | |
| 22 August 2022 | DF | 3 | Ariful Islam Jitu | Sheikh Jamal Dhanmondi | Free | |
| 13 October 2022 | MF | 17 | Mojibur Rahman Jony | Gopalganj Sporting Club | Free | |
| 13 October 2022 | GK | 22 | Shanto Kumar Roy | Saif Sporting Club | Free | |
| 21 October 2022 | FW | 9 | (Afghanistan) Amredin Sharifi | Bangladesh Police FC | Free | |
| 2 November 2022 | FW | 10 | (Brazil) Luiz Júnior | (El Salvador) C.D. Águila | Free | |
| 1 November 2022 | MF | 5 | (Brazil) Thiago Bonfim | (Malta) Zejtun C. | Free | |
| 7 November 2022 | MF | 20 | Mazharul Islam Sourav | Sheikh Jamal Dhanmondi | Free | |
| 7 November 2022 | GK | 25 | Azad Hossain | Chittagong Abahani | Free | |
| 7 November 2022 | MF | 23 | Mohamed Didarul Islam | Sheikh Russel KC | Free | |
| 7 November 2022 | FW | 21 | Jahedul Alam | Swadhinata KS | Free | |
| 17 March 2023 | FW | 77 | (The Gambia) Gaira Joof | (Ethiopia) Fasil Kenema S.C. | Free | |
| 17 March 2023 | FW | 70 | (The Gambia) Pa Omar Babou | (Morocco) SCC Mohammédia | Free | |

=== Transfers out ===
| Date | Position | No. | Player | Moved to | Fee | Source |
|---|---|---|---|---|---|---|
| 8 October 2022 | GK | 25 | Md Ishaque Akondo | Sheikh Jamal Dhanmondi | Free | |
| 8 October 2022 | DF | 6 | Mohammad Salauddin | Muktijoddha Sangsad | Free | |
| 7 November 2022 | DF | 21 | Khorshed Alam | AFC Uttara | Free | |
| March 2023 | FW | 26 | Mohamed Didarul Islam | Free Agent | Released | |
| March 2023 | MF | 14 | Shahadat Hossain | Free Agent | Released | |
| March 2023 | MF | 24 | Prokash Das | Free Agent | Released | |
| March 2023 | DF | 12 | Sajon Mia | AFC Uttara | Free | |
| March 2023 | MF | 5 | (Brazil) Thiago Bonafim | Free Agent | Released | |
| March 2023 | FW | 10 | (Brazil) Luiz Júnior | Persiba Balikpapan | Free | |

== Competitions ==
Win Draw Loss Fixtures

=== Overall ===
| Competition | First match | Last match | Final Position |
|---|---|---|---|
| BPL | 9 December 2022 | 22 July 2023 | 7th |
| Federation Cup | 27 December 2022 | 7 February 2023 | Group stages |
| Independence Cup | 13 November 2022 | 21 November 2022 | Group stages |

=== Overview ===
| Competition | Record | | | | | | | |
| Competition | Pld | W | D | L | GF | GA | GD | Win % |
|---|---|---|---|---|---|---|---|---|
| BPL | 20 | 5 | 8 | 7 | 23 | 25 | −2 | 25.00 |
| Independence Cup | 3 | 1 | 1 | 1 | 5 | 5 | +0 | 33.33 |
| Federation Cup | 1 | 0 | 0 | 1 | 0 | 2 | −2 | 0.00 |
| Total | 24 | 6 | 9 | 9 | 28 | 32 | −4 | 25.00 |

Source: Competitions

=== Premier League ===
| Pos | Team | Pld | W | D | L | GF | GA | GD | Pts |
|---|---|---|---|---|---|---|---|---|---|
| 5 | Sheikh Russel KC | 20 | 8 | 6 | 6 | 33 | 30 | +3 | 30 |
| 6 | Sheikh Jamal DC | 20 | 5 | 9 | 6 | 25 | 32 | −7 | 24 |
| 7 | Fortis FC | 20 | 5 | 8 | 7 | 23 | 25 | −2 | 23 |
| 8 | Chittagong Abahani | 20 | 4 | 9 | 7 | 26 | 35 | −9 | 21 |
| 9 | Rahmatganj MFS | 20 | 4 | 7 | 9 | 15 | 31 | −16 | 19 |

Source: Soccerway
Rules for classification: 1) Points; 2) Goal difference; 3) Goals scored.

==== Results summary ====
| Overall | | | | | | | | Home | | | | | | Away | | | | | |
| Pld | W | D | L | GF | GA | GD | Pts | W | D | L | GF | GA | GD | W | D | L | GF | GA | GD |
|---|---|---|---|---|---|---|---|---|---|---|---|---|---|---|---|---|---|---|---|
| 20 | 5 | 8 | 7 | 23 | 25 | −2 | 23 | 1 | 4 | 4 | 5 | 9 | −4 | 4 | 4 | 3 | 18 | 16 | +2 |

Source: Soccerway

==== Results by round ====
| Round | 1 | 2 | 3 | 4 | 5 | 6 | 7 | 8 | 9 | 10 | 11 | 12 | 13 | 14 | 15 | 16 | 17 | 18 | 19 | 20 | 21 | 22 |
|---|---|---|---|---|---|---|---|---|---|---|---|---|---|---|---|---|---|---|---|---|---|---|
| Ground | A | H | A | (Note: No Fortis FC matchday in this round.) | H | A | H | A | H | A | H | H | A | H | (Note: No Fortis FC matchday in this round.) | A | H | A | H | A | H | A |
| Result | D | L | W | – | D | D | D | D | L | W | D | L | L | W | – | D | W | L | D | L | L | W |
| Position | 7 | 8 | 6 | 7 | 7 | 7 | 6 | 6 | 7 | 6 | 7 | 7 | 7 | 7 | 7 | 7 | 7 | 7 | 7 | 7 | 8 | 7 |

Source: Matches
A = Away; H = Home; W = Win; D = Draw; L = Loss; P = Postponed

=== Matches ===
| 9 December 2022 1 | Dhaka Abahani | 1–1 | Fortis FC | Comilla |
| | Sohel (yellow card) 45+3'; Riyadul (yellow card) 73' (goal) 89' | Report | Júnior 36'; Md Rafiqul Islam (yellow card) 81' | Stadium: Shaheed Dhirendranath Datta Stadium; Referee: Bituraj Barua |

| 23 December 2022 2 | Fortis FC | 0–2 | Bashundhara Kings | Rajshahi |
| 14:30 BST (UTC+6) | | Report | Tariq (yellow card) 40'; Figueira 45+3'; Mohamed Ariful Islm 51' (o.g.) | Stadium: Muktijuddho Sriti Stadium; Referee: Bhubon Mohon Tarafder |

| 31 December 2022 3 | AFC Uttara | 0–1 | Fortis FC | Mymensingh |
| 14:30 BST (UTC+6) | | Report | Mojibor Rahman Jony (yellow card) 5'; Shakhawat 29' | Stadium: Rafiq Uddin Bhuiyan Stadium; Referee: Rimon Mahmud |

| 14 January 2023 5 | Fortis FC | 0–0 | Rahmatganj MFS | Rajshahi |
| 14:45 BST (UTC+6) | Mohamed Ariful Islam (yellow card) 81' | Report | | Stadium: Muktijuddho Sriti Stadium; Referee: Bhubon Mohon Tarafder |

| 21 January 20 6 | Muktijoddha Sangsad KC | 1–1 | Fortis FC | Gopalganj |
| 15:00 BST (UTC+6) | Md Roman (yellow card) 18'; Md Taj Uddin 38'; Ndikumana (yellow card) 81'; Sagor Sarkar (yellow card) 86' | Report | Dinilo 64' | Stadium: Sheikh Fazlul Haque Mani Stadium; Referee: Mahmud Zamal Farouqee Nahid |

| 28 January 2023 7 | Fortis FC | 1–1 | Bangladesh Police FC | Rajshahi |
| 15:00 BST (UTC+6) | Shakhawat 38'; Md Rafiqul Islam (yellow card) 79' | Report | Fahim Morshed (yellow card) 8'; Robiul (yellow card) 19'; Edward Enrique Morillo Jimenéz 40'; Sahed Hossain Miah (yellow card) 79' | Stadium: Muktijuddho Sriti Stadium; Referee: Rimon Mahmud |

| 3 February 2023 8 | Chittagong Abahani | 0–0 | Fortis FC | Munshiganj |
| 15:15 BST (UTC+6) | Emtiyaz Raihan (yellow card) 33'; Md. Rokey (yellow card) 60'; Pulatov (yellow card) 90' | Report | Sabuz Hossain (yellow card) 85' | Stadium: Bir Sreshtho Fl. Lt. Matiur Rahman Stadium; Referee: Zamal Farouqee Nahid |

| 10 February 2023 9 | Fortis FC | 0–1 | Sheikh Russel KC | Rajshahi |
| 15:45 BST (UTC+6) | Ariful Islam Jitu (yellow card) 15' | Report | Brossou 6'; Dipok Roy (yellow card) 64' | Stadium: Muktijuddho Sriti Stadium; Referee: Jasim Akther |

| 18 February 2023 10 | Mohammedan SC | 3–4 | Fortis FC | Comilla |
| 15:45 BST (UTC+6) | Minhajul Abedin Ballu 21'; Souleymane 46'; Jafar (yellow card) 45+3'; Arif Hossain 67' | Report | Abdallah Omar Sajib (yellow card) 38'; Shahidul Islam Sumon (yellow card) 41'; Borhan Uddin 56'; Mojibur Rahman 64' (yellow card) 73'; Amredin (yellow card) 45+4' (goal) 70'; Danilo 79'; Mitul (yellow card) 90+3' | Stadium: Shaheed Dhirendranath Datta Stadium; Referee: Mahmud Zamil Farooque Nahid |

| 24 February 2023 11 | Fortis FC | 1–1 | Sheikh Jamal DC | Rajshahi |
| 15:45 BST (UTC+6) | Sharifi (red card) 19'; Sahin Ahammad 23'; Mazharul Islam Sourav (yellow card) 45'; Shahidul Islam Sumon (yellow card) 65'; Mitul (yellow card) 73'; Danilo (yellow card) 90' | Report | Sulayman Sillah (yellow card) 24'; Nodir Mavlonov (yellow card) 65' (goal) 90+1' | Stadium: Muktijuddho Sriti Stadium; Referee: Bhubon Mohon Tarafder |

| 7 April 2023 12 | Fortis FC | 0–2 | Abahani Limited Dhaka | Rajshahi |
| 15:45 BST (UTC+6) | | Report | Colindres 9'; Peter 13' | Stadium: Muktijuddho Sriti Stadium; Referee: Bhubon Mohon Tarafder |

| 15 April 2023 13 | Bashundhara Kings | 4–1 | Fortis FC | Dhaka |
| 15:45 BST (UTC+6) | Robinho 33', 45+3'; Figueira (yellow card) 57'; Dorielton 59', 70'; Yeasin (yellow card) 83' | Report | Abdullah Omar Sajib (yellow card) 17'; Sahin Mia (yellow card) 32'; Borhan Uddin (yellow card) 45+6'; Garcia Joof 90+3' | Stadium: Bashundhara Kings Arena; Referee: Md Nasir Uddin |

| 29 April 2023 14 | Fortis FC | 4–0 | AFC Uttara | Rajshahi |
| 15:45 BST (UTC+6) | Amredin 3'; Gaira Joof 72'; Pa Omar 78'; Shakhawat 90+4' | Report | Istekharul Alam Shakil (yellow card) 90+3' | Stadium: Muktijuddho Sriti Stadium; Referee: Bhubon Mohon Tarafder |

| 13 May 2023 16 | Rahmatganj MFS | 1–1 | Fortis FC | Munshigonj |
| 16:00 BST (UTC+6) | Diallo 2'; Fatkhulloyev (yellow card) 64'; Khondoker Ashraful Islam (yellow card) 66'; Mohamed Tanvir Hossain (yellow card) 72'; Mohammed Mamun Alif (yellow card) 73' | Report | Gaira Joof 4' (pen.); Jaynal Abedin Dipu (yellow card) 84' | Stadium: Shaheed Bir Sreshtho Flight Lt. Matiur Rahman Stadium; Referee: Md Jashim Akhter |

| 20 May 2023 17 | Fortis FC | 2–0 | Muktijoddha Sangsad KC | Rajshahi |
| 16:00 BST (UTC+6) | Sharifi 84'; Shahin Ahammad (yellow card) 90'; Mozzammel Hossain Nira 90+3' | Report | Mahadud Hossain Fahim (yellow card) 53'; Sajib (yellow card) 54' | Stadium: Muktijuddho Sriti Stadium; Referee: Md Nasir Uddin |

| 27 May 2023 18 | Bangladesh Police FC | 4–2 | Fortis FC | Mymensingh |
| 16:00 BST (UTC+6) | Mate Palacios 6'; Edeard Morillo 15'; Fahim Morshed (yellow card) 60'; Arango 81'; Joyon Kumar Roy (yellow card) 85'; Shahed Miah 90' | Report | Pa Omar (yellow card) 60'; Garcia Joof 63', 90+3' | Stadium: Rafiq Uddin Bhuiyan Stadium; Referee: Mahmud Zamal Farouquee Nahid |

| 3 June 2023 19 | Fortis FC | 1–1 | Chittagong Abahani | Rajshahi |
| 16:00 BST (UTC+6) | Didarul Alam (yellow card) 65'; Shakhawat 65'; Ariful Islam Jitu (yellow card) 87'; Mojibur (yellow card) 88' | Report | Pulatov (yellow card) 6'; Ekbal Hossain 90+1' | Stadium: Muktijuddho Sriti Stadium; Referee: Sabuj Das |

| 7 June 2023 20 | Sheikh Russel KC | 2–0 | Fortis FC | Dhaka |
| 16:00 BST (UTC+6) | Mfon 33'; Shawkat Russel (yellow card) 51'; Ikechukwu 62' | Report | | Stadium: Bashundhara Kings Arena; Referee: Bhubon Mohon Tarafder |

| 14 July 2023 21 | Fortis FC | 0–1 | Mohammedan SC | Rajshahi |
| 16:00 BST (UTC+6) | Ariful Islam Jitu (yellow card) 27'; Danilo (yellow card) 28'; Mojibur (yellow card) 36' | Report | Sunday (yellow card) 28'; Muzaffar Muzaffarov 31'; Emon (yellow card) 84' | Stadium: Muktijuddho Sriti Stadium; Referee: Sabuj Das |

| 22 July 2023 22 | Sheikh Jamal DC | 0–3 | Fortis FC | Gopalganj |
| 16:00 BST (UTC+6) | Shakil Mia (yellow card) 90+6' | Report | Borhan Uddin (yellow card) 35'; Shahin Ahammad (yellow card) 39'; Sharifi 68'; Mohammad Jahedul Alam 72' (yellow card) 73'; Joynal Abedin Dipu 90+2' | Stadium: Sheikh Fazlul Haque Mani Stadium; Referee: Taposh Roy |

=== Federation Cup ===
==== Group stage ====
| Pos | Team | Pld | W | D | L | GF | GA | GD | Pts | Qualification |
|---|---|---|---|---|---|---|---|---|---|---|
| 1 | Bashundhara Kings | 3 | 3 | 0 | 0 | 8 | 3 | +5 | 9 | Advance to knockout phase |
| 2 | Chittagong Abahani | 3 | 1 | 1 | 1 | 1 | 2 | −1 | 4 | Advance to knockout phase |
| 3 | Muktijoddha Sangsad KC | 3 | 1 | 0 | 2 | 5 | 6 | −1 | 3 | Advance to knockout phase |
| 4 | Fortis FC | 3 | 0 | 1 | 2 | 1 | 4 | −3 | 1 | |

Source: Footystats
Rules for classification: Group stage tiebreakers

| 27 December 2022 | Bashundhara Kings | 2–0 | Fortis FC | Munshigonj |
| 14:30 BST (UTC+6) | Rimon (yellow card) 22'; Asror Gafurov 53', 94'; Mahmudul Hasan Kiron (yellow card) 80' | Report | Shahdat Hossain Manik (yellow card) 3' | Stadium: Shaheed Bir Sreshtho Flight Lt. Matiur Rahman Stadium; Referee: Md Nasir Uddin |

| 17 January 2023 | Fortis FC | 0–0 | Chittagong Abahani | Munshigonj |
| 15:00 BST (UTC+6) | | Report | | Stadium: Shaheed Bir Sreshtho Flight Lt. Matiur Rahman Stadium; Referee: Md Jalal Uddin |

| 7 February 2023 | Fortis FC | 1–2 | Muktijoddha Sangsad KC | Munshigonj |
| 15:15 BST (UTC+6) | Sabuz 85' | Report | Emmanuel 44'; Ndikumana 90+1' | Stadium: Shaheed Bir Sreshtho Flight Lt. Matiur Rahman Stadium; Referee: Md Nasir Uddin |

=== Independence Cup ===
==== Group stage ====
| Pos | Team | Pld | W | D | L | GF | GA | GD | Pts | Qualification |
|---|---|---|---|---|---|---|---|---|---|---|
| 1 | Sheikh Russel KC | 3 | 2 | 1 | 0 | 6 | 1 | +5 | 7 | Advance to Knockout stage |
| 2 | Mohammedan SC | 3 | 2 | 0 | 1 | 5 | 4 | +1 | 6 | Advance to Knockout stage |
| 3 | Fortis FC | 3 | 1 | 1 | 1 | 5 | 5 | 0 | 4 | |
| 4 | Bangladesh Navy | 3 | 0 | 0 | 3 | 1 | 7 | −6 | 0 | |

Source: GSA

| 13 November 2022 | Sheikh Russel KC | 1–1 | Fortis FC | Comilla |
| 14:00 | Mfon 51' | Report | Danilo 38' | Stadium: Shaheed Dhirendranath Datta Stadium; Referee: Md Mizanur Rahman |

| 17 November 2022 | Mohammedan SC | 3–1 | Fortis FC | Comilla |
| 14:00 | Diabate 6'; Roger 26'; Jafar 39' | Report | Luiz 14' | Stadium: Shaheed Dhirendranath Datta Stadium; Referee: Golam Mourshed Chowdhury Nayan |

| 21 November 2022 | Bangladesh Navy FC | 1–3 | Fortis FC | Comilla |
| 13:00 | Rony 7' | Report | Amredin 17', 44'; Luiz 61' | Stadium: Shaheed Dhirendranath Datta Stadium; Referee: Md Mizanur Rahman |

== Statistics ==
=== Squad statistics ===
| No. | Pos | Nat | Player | Total | | BPL | | Federation Cup | | Independence Cup | |
| No. | Pos | Nat | Player | Apps | Goals | Apps | Goals | Apps | Goals | Apps | Goals |
|---|---|---|---|---|---|---|---|---|---|---|---|
| 1 | GK | (Bangladesh) | Uttam Barua | 0 | 0 | 0 | 0 | 0 | 0 | 0 | 0 |
| 2 | DF | (Bangladesh) | Shahin Ahammad | 25 | 1 | 20 | 1 | 2 | 0 | 3 | 0 |
| 3 | DF | (Bangladesh) | Ariful Islam Jitu | 23 | 0 | 13+4 | 0 | 3 | 0 | 3 | 0 |
| 4 | DF | (Brazil) | Danilo Quipapá | 22 | 3 | 16+1 | 2 | 2 | 0 | 3 | 1 |
| 6 | DF | (Bangladesh) | Mojammel Hossain Nira | 8 | 1 | 5+2 | 1 | 1 | 0 | 0 | 0 |
| 7 | FW | (Bangladesh) | Kawser Ali Rabbi | 14 | 0 | 4+6 | 0 | 1+1 | 0 | 2 | 0 |
| 8 | MF | (Bangladesh) | Mamunul Islam | 8 | 0 | 4+4 | 0 | 0 | 0 | 0 | 0 |
| 9 | FW | (Afghanistan) | Amredin Sharifi | 20 | 6 | 15+1 | 4 | 1 | 0 | 3 | 2 |
| 11 | FW | (Bangladesh) | Shakhawat Hossain Rony | 20 | 4 | 6+11 | 4 | 0+3 | 0 | 0 | 0 |
| 13 | DF | (Bangladesh) | Joynal Abedin Dipu | 11 | 1 | 4+3 | 1 | 0+2 | 0 | 2 | 0 |
| 15 | FW | (Bangladesh) | Jabed Khan | 10 | 0 | 3+2 | 0 | 1+1 | 0 | 2+1 | 0 |
| 16 | MF | (Bangladesh) | Shahidul Islam Sumon | 23 | 0 | 6+11 | 0 | 3 | 0 | 2+1 | 0 |
| 17 | MF | (Bangladesh) | Mojibur Rahman Jony | 19 | 1 | 17 | 1 | 1+1 | 0 | 0 | 0 |
| 18 | FW | (Bangladesh) | Md Rafiqul Islam | 20 | 0 | 9+5 | 0 | 2+1 | 0 | 3 | 0 |
| 19 | MF | (Bangladesh) | Tariqul Islam | 7 | 0 | 2+4 | 0 | 1 | 0 | 0 | 0 |
| 20 | MF | (Bangladesh) | Mazharul Islam Sourav | 20 | 0 | 15+1 | 0 | 1+1 | 0 | 1+1 | 0 |
| 21 | FW | (Bangladesh) | Mohammed Jahedul Alam | 6 | 1 | 0+4 | 1 | 0+1 | 0 | 0+1 | 0 |
| 22 | GK | (Bangladesh) | Shanto Kumar Roy | 3 | 0 | 1 | 0 | 1 | 0 | 1 | 0 |
| 23 | MF | (Bangladesh) | Didarul Alam | 13 | 0 | 4+7 | 0 | 0+1 | 0 | 0+1 | 0 |
| 25 | GK | (Bangladesh) | Azad Hossain | 4 | 0 | 4 | 0 | 0 | 0 | 0 | 0 |
| 27 | FW | (Bangladesh) | Borhan Uddin | 13 | 1 | 2+6 | 1 | 1+1 | 0 | 0+3 | 0 |
| 30 | GK | (Bangladesh) | Mitul Marma | 19 | 0 | 15 | 0 | 2 | 0 | 2 | 0 |
| 44 | DF | (Bangladesh) | Sabuz Hossain | 18 | 1 | 15+1 | 0 | 2 | 1 | 0 | 0 |
| 66 | DF | (Bangladesh) | Abdullah Omar Sajib | 14 | 0 | 9+3 | 0 | 0+1 | 0 | 0+1 | 0 |
| 70 | FW | (The Gambia) | Pa Omar Babou | 7 | 1 | 7 | 1 | 0 | 0 | 0 | 0 |
| 77 | FW | (The Gambia) | Gaira Joof | 9 | 5 | 9 | 5 | 0 | 0 | 0 | 0 |
| 88 | MF | (Bangladesh) | Mostajeb Khan | 3 | 0 | 2 | 0 | 0+1 | 0 | 0 | 0 |
Players who left during the season
| 5 | MF | (Brazil) | Thiago Bonafim | 13 | 0 | 7 | 0 | 3 | 0 | 3 | 0 |
| 10 | FW | (Brazil) | Luiz Júnior | 13 | 3 | 6+1 | 1 | 3 | 0 | 2+1 | 2 |
| 12 | DF | (Bangladesh) | Sajon Mia | 4 | 0 | 0+1 | 0 | 1+1 | 0 | 1 | 0 |
| 14 | MF | (Bangladesh) | Shahadat Hossain | 0 | 0 | 0 | 0 | 0 | 0 | 0 | 0 |
| 24 | DF | (Bangladesh) | Prokash Das | 0 | 0 | 0 | 0 | 0 | 0 | 0 | 0 |
| 26 | FW | (Bangladesh) | Mohamed Didarul Islam | 0 | 0 | 0 | 0 | 0 | 0 | 0 | 0 |

Source: Soccerway

=== Goalscorers ===
| Rank | Player | Position | Total | BPL | Independence Cup | Federation Cup |
|---|---|---|---|---|---|---|
| 1 | (Afghanistan) Amredin Sharifi | FW | 6 | 4 | 2 | 0 |
| 1 | (The Gambia) Garcia Joof | FW | 5 | 5 | 0 | 0 |
| 2 | (Bangladesh) Shakhawat Hossain Rony | FW | 4 | 4 | 0 | 0 |
| 3 | (Brazil) Danilo Quipapá | CB | 3 | 2 | 1 | 0 |
| 3 | (Brazil) Luiz Júnior | FW | 3 | 1 | 2 | 0 |
| 4 | (Bangladesh) Shahin Ahammad | DF | 1 | 1 | 0 | 0 |
| 4 | (Bangladesh) Mojibur Rahman Jony | MF | 1 | 1 | 0 | 0 |
| 4 | (Bangladesh) Sabuz Hossain | DF | 1 | 0 | 0 | 1 |
| 4 | (Bangladesh) Borhan Uddin | MF | 1 | 1 | 0 | 0 |
| 4 | (The Gambia) Pa Omar Babou | FW | 1 | 1 | 0 | 0 |
| 4 | (Bangladesh) Mojammel Hossain Nira | DF | 1 | 1 | 0 | 0 |
| 4 | (Bangladesh) Mohammed Jahedul Alam | MF | 1 | 1 | 0 | 0 |
| 4 | (Bangladesh) Joynal Abedin Dipu | DF | 1 | 1 | 0 | 0 |
| Total | | | 29 | 23 | 5 | 1 |

Source: Matches
