= 2022–23 Independence Cup (Bangladesh) =

12th season of the Independence Cup (Bangladesh)

Tournament details
- Host country: Bangladesh
- Dates: 13 November–5 December 2022
- Teams: 16
- Venue: 3 (in 3 host cities)

Final positions
- Champions: Bashundhara Kings (2nd title)
- Runners-up: Sheikh Russel KC
- Third place: Dhaka Abahani
- Fourth place: Bangladesh Police FC

Tournament statistics
- Matches played: 32
- Goals scored: 127 (3.97 per match)
- Top scorer(s): 9 goals (Brazil) Dorielton (Bashundhara Kings)
- Best player: (Bangladesh) Rakib Hossain
- Best goalkeeper: (Bangladesh) Anisur Rahman Zico
- Fair play award: Dhaka Abahani

The 2022–23 Independence Cup, also known as Bashundhara Group Independence Cup 2022 due to sponsorship from Bashundhara Group. It was the 13th edition of the Independence Cup, the oldest official club football tournament in Bangladesh. A total of 16 teams were contested in the tournament including two coming through qualifying round.

Bashundhara Kings is the defending champion. They have won the title by beating Sheikh Russel KC by 2(4)−2(1) penalties shoot out on 5 December 2022.

== Participating teams ==
The following sixteen teams will contest in the tournament.

Team	Appearances	Previous best performance
AFC Uttara	1st	Debut
Bangladesh Police FC	2nd	Semi-finals (2021–22)
Bashundhara Kings	3rd	Champions (2018)
BFF Elite Academy	1st	Debut
Chittagong Abahani	7th	Champions (2016)
Abahani Limited Dhaka	12th	Champions (1990,2021–22)
Dhaka Mohammedan	12th	Champions (1972, 1991, 2014)
Fortis FC	1st	Debut
Muktijoddha Sangsad KC	12th	Champions (2005)
Fakirerpool YMC	2nd	Group-stage (2005)
Rahmatganj MFS	12th	Semi-finals (2017-18)
Sheikh Russel KC	8th	Champions (2013)
Sheikh Jamal DC	8th	Runners-up (2012–13)
Uttara FC	1st	Debut
Bangladesh Navy	2nd	Group-stage (2021–22)
Bangladesh Air Force	2nd	Group-stage (2021–22)

== Venues ==
The matches are being played at these three venues across the country.

Comilla	Gopalganj	Munshigonj
Comilla District Stadium	Sheikh Fazlul Haque Mani Stadium	Munshigonj District Stadium
Capacity: 18,000	Capacity: 5,000	Capacity: 10,000
2022–23 Independence Cup (Bangladesh) is located in Bangladesh

== Draw ==
The draw ceremony were held on 31 October 2022 at 3rd floor of BFF house Motijheel, Dhaka. There are sixteen team was divided into four groups. Top two team from each group will through in the Knockout stage.

== Group summary ==
Group A	Group B
Dhaka Mohammedan	AFC Uttara
Fortis FC	Bashundhara Kings
Sheikh Russel KC	Fakirerpool YMC
Bangladesh Navy	Chittagong Abahani
Group C	Group D
Abahani Limited Dhaka	Bangladesh Police FC
Muktijoddha Sangsad KC	BFF Elite Academy
Bangladesh Air Force	Rahmatganj MFS
Uttara FC	Sheikh Jamal DC

Pair-1	Pair-2
Little Friends Club	Bangladesh Navy
Bangladesh Air Force	Bangladesh Army

== Round and dates ==
Dates/Year	Round	Match dates
5 November – 5 December 2022	Qualifying stages	05 - 6 November 2022
5 November – 5 December 2022	Group stages	13 – 24 November 2022
5 November – 5 December 2022	Quarter-finals	26 – 27 November 2022
5 November – 5 December 2022	Semi-finals	30 November – 1 December 2022
5 November – 5 December 2022	Third-position	4 December 2022
5 November – 5 December 2022	Final	5 December 2022

== Match officials ==
Referees

- (Bangladesh) Md Anisur Rahman Sagor
- (Bangladesh) Anwar Hossain
- (Bangladesh) Bituraj Barua
- (Bangladesh) Md Mizanur Rahman
- (Bangladesh) Md Nasiruddin
- (Bangladesh) Golam Mourshed Chowdhury Nayan
- (Bangladesh) Bhubon Mohon Tarafder
- (Bangladesh) Sabuj Das
- (Bangladesh) Rimon Mahmud

Assistant Referees

- (Bangladesh) Md Nuruzzaman
- (Bangladesh) Md Jahid Hasan
- (Bangladesh) Sheikh Iqbal Alam
- (Bangladesh) Md Alamgir Sarker
- (Bangladesh) Rasel Mahmud
- (Bangladesh) Md Monir Dhali
- (Bangladesh) Md Mahmudul Hasan Mamun
- (Bangladesh) Sujoy Barua
- (Bangladesh) Junayed Sharif
- (Bangladesh) Ahmed Rafsan Joni
- (Bangladesh) Robin Khan
- (Bangladesh) Mehedi Hasan Emon
- (Bangladesh) Shah Alam
- (Bangladesh) Shafiqul Islam Emon
- (Bangladesh) Soumik Pal
- (Bangladesh) Bikash Sarker

== Qualifying play-offs ==
Play-off 1
Team 1	Score	Team 2
Little Friends Club	2–2 (p 4–5)	Bangladesh Air Force

Play-off 2
Team 1	Score	Team 2
Bangladesh Navy	2–2 (p 4–3)	Bangladesh Army

=== Matches ===
All times at local (UTC+6)

5 November 2022
14:00

Bangladesh Air Force	2–2	Little Friends Club
Sumon 28', 75'	Report	Rayhan 37'; Yeasin 66'
Penalties
	5–4

Sheikh Fazlul Haque Mani Stadium, Gopalganj
Referee: Md Anisur Rahman Sagor

6 November 2022
14:00

Bangladesh Navy	2–2	Bangladesh Army
Habibur 36'; Raja 75'	Report	Mizanur 27'; Morsalin 45+3'
Penalties
	4–3

Munshigonj District Stadium, Munshigonj
Referee: Bituraj Barua

== Group stages ==
Key to colours in group tables
Group winners and runners-up advance to the Knockout-stage

Tiebreakers

Teams were ranked according to points (3 points for a win, 1 point for a draw, 0 points for a loss), and if tied on points, the following tie-breaking criteria were applied, in the order given, to determine the rankings.

1. Points in head-to-head matches among tied teams;
2. Goal difference in head-to-head matches among tied teams;
3. Goals scored in head-to-head matches among tied teams;
4. If more than two teams are tied, and after applying all head-to-head criteria above, a subset of teams are still tied, all head-to-head criteria above are reapplied exclusively to this subset of teams;
5. Goal difference in all group matches;
6. Goals scored in all group matches;
7. Penalty shoot-out if only two teams were tied and they met in the last round of the group;
8. Disciplinary points (yellow card = 1 point, red card as a result of two yellow cards = 3 points, direct red card = 3 points, yellow card followed by direct red card = 4 points);
9. Drawing of lots.

=== Group A ===
Pos	Team	Pld	W	D	L	GF	GA	GD	Pts	Qualification
1	Sheikh Russel KC	3	2	1	0	6	1	+5	7	Advance to Knockout stage
2	Mohammedan SC	3	2	0	1	5	4	+1	6	Advance to Knockout stage
3	Fortis FC	3	1	1	1	5	5	0	4	
4	Bangladesh Navy	3	0	0	3	1	7	−6	0	

Source: GSA
13 November 2022
14:00

Dhaka Mohammedan	2–0	Bangladesh Navy
Diabate 84'; Jafar 87'	Report

Munshigonj District Stadium, Munshigonj
Referee: Md Anisur Rahman Sagor
13 November 2022
14:00

Sheikh Russel KC	1–1	Fortis FC
Mfon 51'	Report	Danilo 38'

Comilla District Stadium, Comilla
Referee: Md Mizanur Rahman

17 November 2022
14:00

Sheikh Russel KC	2–0	Bangladesh Navy
Ibrahim 2'; Mapuku 12'	Report

Sheikh Fazlul Haque Mani Stadium, Gopalganj
Referee: Anwar Hossain
17 November 2022
14:00

Dhaka Mohammedan	3–1	Fortis FC
Diabate 6'; Roger 26'; Jafar 39'	Report	Luiz 14'

Comilla District Stadium, Comilla
Referee: GM Chowdhury Nayan

21 November 2022
13:00

Dhaka Mohammedan	0–3	Sheikh Russel KC
	Report	Brossou 2'; Ibrahim 51'; Mfon 59'

Sheikh Fazlul Haque Mani Stadium, Gopalganj
Referee: Md Anisur Rahman Sagor
21 November 2022
13:00

Bangladesh Navy	1–3	Fortis FC
Rony 7'	Report	Amredin 17', 44'; Luiz 61'

Comilla District Stadium, Comilla
Referee: Mizanur Rahman

=== Group B ===
Pos	Team	Pld	W	D	L	GF	GA	GD	Pts	Qualification
1	Bashundhara Kings (C)	3	3	0	0	19	0	+19	9	Advance to Knockout stage
2	Chittagong Abahani	3	2	0	1	6	3	+3	6	Advance to Knockout stage
3	Fakirerpool YMC	3	1	0	2	3	19	−16	3	
4	AFC Uttara	3	0	0	3	2	8	−6	0	

Source: GSA
(C) Champions
14 November 2022
14:00

Bashundhara Kings	14–0	Fakirerpool YMC
Biplu 6'; Tariq 10'; Robinho 12', 24', 61'; Miguel 21'; Dorielton 27', 44', 48', 84', 85', 90'; Jony 67'; Yeasin 68'	Report

Comilla District Stadium, Comilla
Referee: Md Nasiruddin
14 November 2022
14:00

AFC Uttara	1–2	Chittagong Abahani
Niam 73'	Report	Bamba 16'; Ojukwu 76'

Sheikh Fazlul Haque Mani Stadium, Gopalganj
Referee: Golam Mourshed Chowdhury Nayan

18 November 2022
14:00

Chittagong Abahani	4–0	Fakirerpool YMC
Jamir 8'; Bamba 18' (pen.), 71'; Ojukwu 92+2' (pen.)	Report

Munshigonj District Stadium, Munshigonj
Referee: Md Mizanur Rahman
18 November 2022
14:00

AFC Uttara	0–3	Bashundhara Kings
	Report	Rakib 11'; Dorielton 57' (pen.), 90+1'

Sheikh Fazlul Haque Mani Stadium, Gopalganj
Referee: Md Anisur Rahman Sagor

22 November 2022
13:00

Bashundhara Kings	2–0	Chittagong Abahani
Miguel 75'; Rakib 76'	Report

Munshigonj District Stadium, Munshigonj
Referee: Md Alamgir Sarker
22 November 2022
13:00

AFC Uttara	1–3	Fakirerpool YMC
Sakib 42'	Report	Rezzatul 15'; Afzal 31'; Dalim 76'

Comilla District Stadium, Comilla
Referee: Md Nasiruddin

=== Group C ===
Pos	Team	Pld	W	D	L	GF	GA	GD	Pts	Qualification
1	Abahani Ltd. Dhaka	3	3	0	0	8	2	+6	9	Advance to Knockout stage
2	Muktijoddha SKC	3	2	0	1	9	4	+5	6	Advance to Knockout stage
3	Bangladesh Air Force	3	1	0	2	4	9	−5	3	
4	Uttara FC	3	0	0	3	1	7	−6	0	

Source: GSA
15 November 2022
14:00

Dhaka Abahani	2–0	Uttara FC
Getterson 34'; Rakib 42' (o.g.)	Report

Munshigonj District Stadium, Munshigonj
Referee: Sabuj Das
15 November 2022
14:00

Bangladesh Air Force	1–5	Muktijoddha Sangsad KC
Sumon 76'	Report	Rabby 28'; Faisal 44', 90+2'; Sajib 69'; Taj 90+4'

Sheikh Fazlul Haque Mani Stadium, Gopalganj
Referee: Bhubon Mohon Tarafder

19 November 2022
14:00

Muktijoddha Sangsad KC	3–0	Uttara FC
Sajib 8'; Soma 79'; Uzochukwu 83'	Report

Sheikh Fazlul Haque Mani Stadium, Gopalganj
Referee: Rimon Mahmud
19 November 2022
14:00

Dhaka Abahani	3–1	Bangladesh Air Force
Maraz 18'; Colindres 32'; Getterson 43'	Report	Sumon 11'

Munshigonj District Stadium, Munshigonj
Referee: Md Nasiruddin

23 November 2022
13:00

Bangladesh Air Force	2–1	Uttara FC
Rakibul 74'; Juwel 90+3'	Report	Sagor 47'

Munshigonj District Stadium, Munshigonj
Referee: Rimon Mahmud
23 November 2022
13:00

Muktijoddha Sangsad KC	1–3	Dhaka Abahani
Emmanuel 51'	Report	Raphael 4', 27'; Getterson 61'

Comilla District Stadium, Comilla
Referee: Golam Mourshed Chowdhury Nayan

=== Group D ===
Pos	Team	Pld	W	D	L	GF	GA	GD	Pts	Qualification
1	Police FC	3	2	1	0	9	5	+4	7	Advance to Knockout stage
2	Sheikh Jamal DC	3	1	1	1	8	6	+2	4	Advance to Knockout stage
3	Rahmatganj MFS	3	1	1	1	6	7	−1	4	
4	BFF Elite Academy	3	0	1	2	2	7	−5	1	

Source: GSA
16 November 2022
14:00

Rahmatganj MFS	1–4	Bangladesh Police FC
Abdullah 84' (pen.)	Report	Joyonto 4'; Bablu 10', 16'; Faysal 88'

Munshigonj District Stadium, Munshigonj
Referee: Md Anisur Rahman Sagor
16 November 2022
14:00

Sheikh Jamal DC	3–0	BFF Elite Academy
Stewart 21', 28', 66'	Report

Comilla District Stadium, Comilla
Referee: Md Nasiruddin

20 November 2022
13:00

BFF Elite Academy	1–1	Bangladesh Police FC
Mirajul 40'	Report	Morillo 34'

Munshigonj District Stadium, Munshigonj
Referee: Bhubon Mohon Torafder
20 November 2022
13:00

Sheikh Jamal DC	2–2	Rahmatganj MFS
Otabek 45+2'; Shakil 53'	Report	Fatkhulloyev 62'; Juel 69'

Comilla District Stadium, Comilla
Referee: Bituraj Barua

24 November 2022
13:00

Rahmatganj MFS	3–1	BFF Elite Academy
Fatkhulloyev 38'; Michael 45+1'; Saddam 55'	Report	Asadul 77'

Munshigonj District Stadium, Munshigonj
Referee: Md Anisur Rahman Sagor
24 November 2022
13:00

Bangladesh Police FC	4–3	Sheikh Jamal DC
Quazem 9'; Bablu 22'; Malikov 37' (pen.); Hernandez 57'	Report	Stewart 37', 43'; Rasel 76' (o.g.)

Sheikh Fazlul Haque Mani Stadium, Gopalganj
Referee: Md Alamgir Sarker

== Knockout stage ==
- In the knockout stages, if a match finished goalless at the end of normal playing time, extra time would have been played (two periods of 15 minutes each) and followed, if necessary, by a penalty shoot-out to determine the winner.

=== Bracket ===
Quarter-finals
26 November – Comilla
Sheikh Russel KC	1
Chittagong Abahani	0
27 November – Gopalganj
Dhaka Abahani (a.e.t.)	2
Sheikh Jamal DC	1
26 November – Munshigonj
Bashundhara Kings	2
Mohammedan SC	0
27 November – Comilla
Bangladesh Police FC (a.e.t.)	5
Muktijoddha Sangsad KC	4

Semi-finals
30 November – Munshigonj
Sheikh Russel KC	3
Dhaka Abahani	2
1 December – Gopalganj
Bashundhara Kings	3
Bangladesh Police FC	1

Final
5 December – Comilla
Sheikh Russel KC	2 (1)
Bashundhara Kings (p)	2 (4)
Third-place
4 December – Munshigonj
Dhaka Abahani	4
Bangladesh Police FC	1

=== Quarter-finals ===
26 November 2022
13:00

Sheikh Russel KC	1–0	Chittagong Abahani
Mfon 85'	Report

Comilla District Stadium, Comilla
Referee: Md Mizanur Rahman
26 November 2022
13:00

Bashundhara Kings	2–0	Dhaka Mohammedan
Rakib 34'; Robson 84'	Report

Munshigonj District Stadium, Munshigonj
Referee: Md Anisur Rahman Sagor

27 November 2022
13:00

Dhaka Abahani	2–1 (a.e.t.)	Sheikh Jamal DC
Shakil 30' (o.g.); Rahim 99'	Report	Stewart 77'

Sheikh Fazlul Haque Mani Stadium, Gopalganj
Referee: Md Alamgir Sarker
27 November 2022
13:00

Bangladesh Police FC	5–4 (a.e.t.)	Muktijoddha Sangsad KC
Bablu 16'; Morillo 33'; Hernandez 81'; Malikov 86' (pen.); Eshanur 120'	Report	Emmanuel 45'; Ndikuma 55', 70'; Al Amin 90+3' (o.g.)

Comilla District Stadium, Comilla
Referee: Bituraj Barua

=== Semi-finals ===
30 November 2022
13:00

Sheikh Russel KC	3–2	Dhaka Abahani
Brossou 31'; Mfon 54'; Talipov 72'	Report	Nworah 64'; Colindres 90+5' (pen.)

Munshigonj District Stadium, Munshigonj
Referee: Md Mizanur Rahman

1 December 2022
13:00

Bashundhara Kings	3–1	Bangladesh Police FC
Robino 13' (pen.); Rakib 55'; Dorielton 71'	Report	Edward 90+1'

Sheikh Fazlul Haque Mani Stadium, Gopalganj
Referee: Md Alamgir Sarker

=== Third-place ===
4 December 2022
13:00

Dhaka Abahani	4–1	Bangladesh Police FC
Colindres 4'; Yousef 39'; Emon 76'; Getterson 85'	Report	Rasel 43'

Munshigonj District Stadium, Munshigonj
Referee: Bituraj Barua

=== Final ===
5 December 2022
13:00
Final

Sheikh Russel KC	2–2 (a.e.t.)	Bashundhara Kings
Mfon 12', 32' (pen.)	Report	Miguel 1'; Robson 45' (pen.)
Penalties
Sohel (penalty missed); Hemanta (penalty scored); Khalekurzaman Sabuj (penalty missed)	1–4	Robson (penalty scored); Dorielton (penalty scored); Reza (penalty scored); Zico (penalty scored)

Comilla District Stadium, Comilla
Referee: Golam Mourshed Chowdhury Nayan

== Statistics ==
=== Goalscorers ===
There have been 127 goals scored in 32 matches, for an average of 3.97 goals per match.

9 goals

- (Brazil) Dorielton (Bashundhara Kings)

6 goals

- (Saint Vincent and the Grenadines) Cornelius Stewart (Sheikh Jamal DC)
- (Nigeria) Mfon Udoh (Sheikh Russel KC)
- (Brazil) Robinho (Bashundhara Kings)

4 goals

- (Brazil) Getterson Alves Santos (Dhaka Abahani)
- M S Bablu (Bangladesh Police FC)
- (Bangladesh) Rakib Hossain (Bashundhara Kings)

3 goals

- (Ivory Coast) Yacouba Bamba (Chittagong Abahani)
- (Venezuela) Edward Morillo (Bangladesh Police FC)
- (Costa Rica) Daniel Colindres (Dhaka Abahani)
- (Brazil) Miguel Figueira (Bashundhara Kings)

2 goals

- (Bangladesh) Faisal Ahmed Shitol (Muktijoddha Sangsad KC)
- (Bangladesh) Jafar Iqbal (Dhaka Mohammedan)
- (Mali) Souleymane Diabate (Dhaka Mohammedan
- (Nigeria) Ojukwu David Ifegwu (Chittagong Abahani)
- (Bangladesh) Aminur Rahman Sajib (Muktijoddha Sangsad KC)
- Sumon Reza (Bangladesh Air Force)
- (Bangladesh) Mohammad Ibrahim (Sheikh Russel KC)
- (Brazil) Luiz Junior (Fortis FC)
- (Afghanistan) Amredin Sharifi (Fortis FC)
- (Brazil) Raphael Augusto (Dhaka Abahani)
- (Kyrgyzstan) Almazbek Malikov (Bangladesh Police FC)
- (Tajikistan) Fatkhullo Fatkhulloyev (Rahmatganj MFS)
- (Nigeria) Emmanuel Uzochukwu (Muktijoddha Sangsad KC)
- (Panama) Jose Alexander Hernandez (Bangladesh Police FC)
- (Ivory Coast) Kpehi Didier Brossou (Sheikh Russel KC)

1 goal

- (Bangladesh) Emon Mahmud Babu (Dhaka Abahani)
- Rasel Hossain (Bangladesh Police FC)
- (Brazil) Danilo Quipapá (Fortis FC)
- (Bangladesh) Biplu Ahmed (Bashundhara Kings)
- (Bangladesh) Tariq Kazi (Bashundhara Kings)
- (Bangladesh) Yeasin Arafat (Bashundhara Kings)
- (Bangladesh) Masuk Mia Jony (Bashundhara Kings)
- (Bangladesh) Niam Uddin (AFC Uttara)
- (Bangladesh) Rabby Bhuyia (Muktijoddha Sangsad KC)
- (Bangladesh) Md Taj Uddin (Muktijoddha Sangsad KC)
- Joyonto Kumar Roy (Bangladesh Police FC)
- Isa Faysal (Bangladesh Police FC)
- (Bangladesh) Mohammad Abdullah (Rahmatganj MFS)
- (Brazil) Roger Duarte (Dhaka Mohammedan
- (Democratic Republic of the Congo) Junior Mapuku (Sheikh Russel KC)
- (Bangladesh) Jamir Uddin (Chittagong Abahani)
- (Nigeria) Emmanuel Uzochukwu (Muktijoddha Sangsad KC)
- (Syria) Yousef Mohammad (Dhaka Abahani)
- (Japan) Soma Otani (Muktijoddha Sangsad KC)
- (Bangladesh) Maraz Hossain Opi (Dhaka Abahani)
- (Bangladesh) Samim Yasir Juel (Rahmatganj MFS)
- (Bangladesh) Shakil Ahmed (Sheikh Jamal DC)
- (Bangladesh) Mirajul Islam (BFF Elite Academy)
- Shakhawat Hossain Rony (Bangladesh Navy)
- (Bangladesh) Dalim Barman (Fakirerpool YMC)
- (Bangladesh) Afzal Hossain (Fakirerpool YMC)
- (Bangladesh) Rezzatul Islam (Fakirerpool YMC)
- (Bangladesh) Sakib Bepari (AFC Uttara)
- (Bangladesh) Mohammed Sagor (Uttara FC)
- Juwel (Bangladesh Air Force)
- Rakibul (Bangladesh Air Force)
- Syed Shah Quazem Kirmane (Bangladesh Police FC)
- (Brazil) Michael Morais (Rahmatganj MFS)
- (Bangladesh) Saddam Anny (Rahmatganj MFS)
- (Bangladesh) Asadul Molla (BFF Elite Academy)
- Eshanur Rahman (Bangladesh Police FC)
- (Burundi) Landry Ndikumana (Muktijoddha Sangsad KC)
- (Bangladesh) Mohamed Rahim Uddin (Dhaka Abahani)
- (Uzbekistan) Otabek Valijonov (Sheikh Jamal DC)
- (Nigeria) Peter Nworah (Dhaka Abahani)
- (Uzbekistan) Timur Talipov (Sheikh Russel KC)

=== Own goals ===
† Bold Club indicates winner of the match

Player	Club	Opponent	Result	Date
(Bangladesh) Md Rakib Hasan	Uttara FC	Dhaka Abahani	0–2	15 November 2022
(Bangladesh) Rasel Hossain	Bangladesh Police FC	Sheikh Jamal DC	4–3	24 November 2022
(Bangladesh) Md Al-Amin	Bangladesh Police FC	Rahmatganj MFS	5–4	27 November 2022
(Bangladesh) Md Shakil Hossain	Sheikh Jamal DC	Dhaka Abahani	1–2	27 November 2022

=== Hat-tricks ===
Player	For	Against	Result	Date	Ref
(Brazil) Dorielton ^{6}	Bashundhara Kings	Fakirerpool YMC	14–0	14 November 2022	
(Brazil) Robinho	Bashundhara Kings	Fakirerpool YMC	14–0	14 November 2022	
(Saint Vincent and the Grenadines) Cornelius Stewart	Sheikh Jamal DC	BFF Elite Academy	3–0	16 November 2022	

^{n} Player scored n goals.

== Winners ==
12th Independence Cup (Bangladesh) 2022–23
Winners
Bashundhara Kings
Second Title

== Awards ==
=== Player of the Match ===
Match	Player of the Match	
Match	Player	Club
Semi-finals 1	(Ivory Coast) Didier Brossou	Sheikh Russel KC
Semi-finals 2	(Bangladesh) Rakib Hossain	Bashundhara Kings
Third-place	(Syria) Yousef Mohammad	Dhaka Abahani
Final	(Bangladesh) Anisur Rahman Zico	Bashundhara Kings

== See also ==
- 2022–23 Federation Cup (Bangladesh)
- 2022–23 Bangladesh Premier League
