= Mehedi Hasan Srabon =

Bangladeshi footballer (born 2005)

- Srabon in 2024

Personal information
- Full name: Mohammed Mehedi Hasan Srabon
- Date of birth: 12 August 2005 (age 21)
- Place of birth: Comilla, Bangladesh
- Height: 1.88 m (6 ft 2 in)
- Position: Goalkeeper

Team information
- Current team: Bashundhara Kings
- Number: 1

Youth career
- 2018–2021: Bibir Bazar Academy
- 2021: Bashundhara Kings

Senior career*
Years	Team	Apps	(Gls)
2021–	Bashundhara Kings	30	(0)
2021–2022	→ Gopalganj (loan)	2	(0)
2022–2023	→ Muktijoddha Sangsad (loan)	16	(0)

International career^{‡}
2019–2020	Bangladesh U17	3	(0)
2024	Bangladesh U20	3	(0)
2023–	Bangladesh U23	11	(0)
2023–	Bangladesh	9	(0)
Medal record
Men's football
Representing Bangladesh
SAFF U-17 Championship
Bronze medal – third place	2019 India	Team
SAFF U-20 Championship
Winner	2024 Nepal	Team
- * Club domestic league appearances and goals as of 27 October 2026 ‡ National team caps and goals as of 14 November 2026

Mehedi Hasan Srabon (Bengali: মেহেদী হাসান শ্রাবণ, Bengali pronunciation: [meɦedi ɦasan sraboɳ]; born 12 August 2005) is a Bangladeshi professional footballer who plays as a goalkeeper for Bangladesh Premier League club Bashundhara Kings and the Bangladesh national team.

== Early career ==
In 2017, Srabon won an interschool football tournament with Bakhrabad Gas Adarsha Bidhalaya. In the tournament final, he saved two penalties in the tiebreaker. His school football coach advised him to join the trials for Bangladesh Krira Shikkha Protishtan (BKSP), which is the country's national sports institution. Although he failed the medical examinations due to a tooth worm, he managed to make the cut during the Bangladesh Football Federation nationwide talent hunt program.

== Club career ==
=== Bashundhara Kings ===
In March 2021, Srabon began training with the reserves and youth team of the Bangladesh Premier League club Bashundhara Kings. He was given a long-term contract after impressing the club's goalkeeper coach, Nuruzzaman Nayan. However, due to the presence of the country's first-choice keeper, Anisur Rahman Zico, along with other experienced campaigners, he was not able to appear for the senior team.

==== Gopalganj Sporting Club (loan) ====
In March 2022, Srabon was loaned to Gopalganj Sporting Club for the second phase of the 2022–23 Bangladesh Championship League. He made his debut as a substitute against Agrani Bank SC on 6 June 2022. His only appearances for the club came during the last two league games of that season.

==== Muktijoddha Sangsad KC (loan) ====
In November 2022, after a few months of training with Bashundhara Kings U18, Srabon joined Bangladesh Premier League club Muktijoddha Sangsad KC on a loan deal. On 15 November 2022, Srabon made his competitive debut for the club during a 5–1 victory over Bangladesh Air Force in the 2022–23 Independence Cup.

==== Return to Bashundhara Kings ====
In July 2023, returned to Bashundhara Kings for the preliminary round of the 2023–24 AFC Champions League following the relegation of Muktijoddha Sangsad. On 25 October 2023, Srabon made his competitive debut for the club against Mohun Bagan SG during the 2023–24 AFC Cup. During the tournament, Srabon's misplaced pass against Maziya S&RC saw the Maldivian club take the lead in a game where Bahsunndhara eventually clinched the victory.

He continued to receive criticism from both fans and the media after conceding another goal due to an individual error during a 2–1 victory over Bangladesh Army in the 2023–24 Independence Cup. He eventually repaid the coach's faith in him, receiving the man of the match award during a 4–0 victory over Abahani Limited Dhaka in the semi-final.

== International career ==
In 2019, while training at BKSP, Srabon got selected for the Bangladesh U15 team by coach Mustafa Anwar Parvez, for the 2019 SAFF U-15 Championship. In the same year, he participated in the UEFA Assist U-16 Development Tournament held in Dhaka, making his only appearance as a late substitute against Maldives U16.

He was also part of the Bangladesh U16 team at the 2020 AFC U-16 Championship qualifiers. He spent the entire tournament as an unused substitute.

In March 2023, Srabon was called up to the Bangladesh national team camp at Medina, Saudi Arabia. On 6 September 2023, Srabon made his Bangladesh U23 debut during a 0–2 defeat to Malaysia U23 in the 2024 AFC U-23 Asian Cup qualifiers.

On 21 November 2023, Srabon made his senior international debut, coming on as a substitute for the injured Mitul Marma during a 1–1 draw in the 2026 FIFA World Cup qualification – AFC second round against Lebanon. Srabon's failure to grip the ball in the 72nd minute led to Bangladesh conceding the opening goal.

== Career statistics ==
=== Club ===
As of 15 May 2026.

Appearances and goals by club, season and competition
Club	Season	League			Domestic Cup (Note: Appearance(s) in Bangladesh Federation Cup)		Other		Continental		Total	
Club	Season	Division	Apps	Goals	Apps	Goals	Apps	Goals	Apps	Goals	Apps	Goals
Bashundhara Kings U18	2020–21	—	—		—		—		—		0	0
Gopalganj SC (loan)	2021–22	BCL	2	0	—		—		—		2	0
Muktijoddha Sangsad (loan)	2022–23	BFL	16	0	3	0	4 (Note: Appearance(s) in Bangladesh Independence Cup)	0	—		23	0
Bashundhara Kings	2023–24	BFL	10	0	4	0	4	0	4 (Note: Appearance(s) in AFC Cup)	0	22	0
Bashundhara Kings	2024–25	BFL	15	0	5	0	0	0	1 (Note: Appearance(s) in AFC Challenge League)	0	21	0
Bashundhara Kings	2025–26	BFL	2	0	4	0	1 (Note: Appearance(s) in Bangladesh Challenge Cup)	0	3	0	10	0
Bashundhara Kings	Total		27	0	13	0	5	0	8	0	53	0
Career total			45	0	16	0	9	0	8	0	78	0

=== International ===
As of 14 November 2026.

Bangladesh
Year	Apps	Goals
2023	1	0
2024	1	0
2026	7	0
Total	9	0

== Honours ==
Bashundhara Kings

- Bangladesh Premier League: 2023–24
- Independence Cup: 2023–24

Bangladesh U-20

- SAFF U-20 Championship: 2024
