= Mojibur Rahman Jony =

Bangladeshi footballer

Personal information
- Full name: Mojibur Rahman Jony
- Date of birth: 2 June 2005 (age 21)
- Place of birth: Dinajpur, Bangladesh
- Height: 1.65 m (5 ft 5 in)
- Position: Central midfielder

Team information
- Current team: Mohammedan SC

Youth career
- 2017–2021: BKSP

Senior career*
Years	Team	Apps	(Gls)
2021	Bikrampur Kings	9	(5)
2021–2022	BFF Elite Academy	2	(0)
2022	Gopalganj SC	11	(2)
2022–2023	Fortis	17	(1)
2023–2026	Bashundhara Kings	31	(4)
2026–	Mohammedan SC	0	(0)

International career^{‡}
2017	Bangladesh U15		(0)
2017	Bangladesh U16	1	(0)
2022–	Bangladesh U20	6	(1)
2023–	Bangladesh U23	7	(0)
2026–	Bangladesh Olympic	3	(0)
2023–	Bangladesh	21	(2)
Medal record
Men's football
Representing Bangladesh
SAFF U-17 Championship
Bronze medal – third place	2017 Nepal	Team
SAFF U-20 Championship
Runner-up	2022 India	Team
- * Club domestic league appearances and goals as of 15 September 2026 ‡ National team caps and goals as of 8 June 2026

Mojibur Rahman Jony (Bengali: মজিবুর রহমান জনি; born 2 June 2005) is a Bangladeshi professional footballer who plays as a midfielder for Bangladesh Premier League club Mohammedan SC and the Bangladesh national team.

== Early life ==
Mojibur Rahman Jony was born on 2 June 2005, in Dinajpur. He began playing football in 2009, with the help of his uncle while his day-labour father, who worked at a rice mill, and elder brother also helped him pursue the sport. His performances during the National Sports Council Cup got him selected for advanced training in Gopalganj, Khulna, and Barishal before getting admitted to Bangladesh Krira Shikkha Protishtan (BKSP) in 2017. He represented Bangladesh in youth football at the 2017 SAFF U-15 Championship and 2018 AFC U-16 Championship qualifiers.

== Club career ==
=== Bikrampur Kings ===
Jony came to Dhaka to play for Bikrampur Kings in the Super League round of the 2019–20 Dhaka Third Division League. On 22 August 2021, he scored his first goal for the club coming as a brace against Asaduzzaman FA, in a 2–1 victory. With 5 goals in 9 games, he led Bikrampur to promotion to the Dhaka Second Division League as one of the top five teams in the league. However, he was diagnosed with appendicitis, and underwent surgery in 2019, keeping him out of the game for a year.

=== BFF Elite Academy ===
In September 2021, Jony joined BFF Elite Academy for the 2021–22 Bangladesh Championship League season and made his debut during the academy's inaugural professional league match on 20 February 2022, against NoFeL SC.

=== Gopalganj SC ===
After only appearing twice in the first phase of the league he moved to Gopalganj SC, during the mid-season transfer window in March. On 11 June 2022, he scored a brace against Kawran Bazar PS in the last game of the season, helping his side to a 2–1 victory.

=== Fortis ===
On 13 October 2022, Jony joined the newly promoted Fortis in the Bangladesh Premier League. On 18 February 2023, he scored his first goal for the club in a 4–3 victory over Mohammedan SC. In July 2023, Bashundhara Kings signed Jony in preparation for the preliminary round of the 2023–24 AFC Champions League.

=== Mohammedan SC ===
In August 2026, he joined Mohammedan SC.

== International career ==
Jony represented the Bangladesh U20 at the 2022 SAFF U-20 Championship and 2023 AFC U-20 Asian Cup qualification. During the AFC U-20 qualifiers in Arad, Bahrain he scored a goal against Nepal U20 and also registered two assists in four matches.

In March 2023, he was called up to the senior national team for a training camp held in Medina, Saudi Arabia. On 25 March 2023, he made his debut for the Bangladesh national team in a 1–0 victory over Seychelles.

On 15 June 2023, Jony scored his first senior international goal coming in a 1–0 victory over Cambodia.

== Career statistics ==
=== Club ===
As of 23 February 2023.

Appearances and goals by club, season and competition
Club	Season	League			Domestic Cup (Note: Appearance(s) in Bangladesh Federation Cup)		Other (Note: Appearance(s) in Bangladesh Independence Cup)		Continental		Total	
Club	Season	Division	Apps	Goals	Apps	Goals	Apps	Goals	Apps	Goals	Apps	Goals
Bikrampur Kings	2019–20	Dhaka Third Division League	9	5	—		—		—		9	5
BFF Elite Academy	2021–22	Bangladesh Championship League	2	0	—		—		—		2	0
Gopalganj SC	2021–22	Bangladesh Championship League	11	2	—		—		—		11	2
Fortis	2022–23	Bangladesh Premier League	17	1	2	0	0	0	—		19	1
Bashundhara Kings	2023–24	Bangladesh Premier League	3	0	0	0	1	0	0	0	4	0
Career total			42	8	2	0	1	0	0	0	45	8

=== International ===
As of 16 November 2024.

Bangladesh
Year	Apps	Goals
2023	13	1
2024	7	1
Total	20	2

=== International goals ===
==== Youth ====
Scores and results list Bangladesh's goal tally first.

No.	Date	Venue	Opponent	Score	Result	Competition
1.	18 September 2022	Al Muharraq Stadium, Arad, Bahrain	Nepal	1–0	3–0	2023 AFC U-20 Championship qualifiers

==== Senior ====
Scores and results list Bangladesh's goal tally first.

No.	Date	Venue	Opponent	Score	Result	Competition
1.	15 June 2023	National Olympic Stadium, Phnom Penh, Cambodia	Cambodia	1–0	1–0	Friendly
2.	16 November 2024	Bashundhara Kings Arena, Dhaka, Bangladesh	Maldives	1–1	2–1	Friendly

== Honours ==
Bashundhara Kings

- Bangladesh Premier League: 2023–24
- Independence Cup: 2023–24
