= Rafiqul Islam (footballer) =

Bangladeshi footballer

Personal information
- Full name: Md Rafiqul Islam
- Date of birth: 12 February 2004 (age 22)
- Place of birth: Tangail, Bangladesh
- Height: 1.63 m (5 ft 4 in)
- Position: Left winger

Team information
- Current team: City Club
- Number: 11

Senior career*
Years	Team	Apps	(Gls)
2017–2018	Tangail FA		
2018–2019	Khilgaon FA		
2019–2020	Jatrabari KC		
2020–2021	Farashganj SC	17	(3)
2021–2022	NoFeL SC	20	(12)
2022–2023	Fortis	14	(0)
2023–2025	Bashundhara Kings	20	(2)
2025–2026	Rahmatganj MFS	9	(1)
2026–	City Club	0	(0)

International career^{‡}
2022	Bangladesh U20	9	(1)
2023–2025	Bangladesh U23	8	(0)
2023–	Bangladesh	8	(0)
Medal record
Men's football
Representing Bangladesh
SAFF U-20 Championship
Runner-up	2022 India	Team
- * Club domestic league appearances and goals as of 24 August 2026 ‡ National team caps and goals as of 24 August 2026

Md Rafiqul Islam (Bengali: মোঃ রফিকুল ইসলাম; born 12 February 2004) is a Bangladeshi professional footballer who plays as a left winger for Bangladesh Football League club City Club and the Bangladesh national team.

== Club career ==
Rafiqul started his career in the Dhaka Third Division League with his hometown club Tangail Football Academy. He made his professional league debut with Farashganj SC in the 2020–21 Bangladesh Championship League.

He joined NoFeL SC for the 2021–22 season, and scored 12 goals from 20 games, which earned him a callup to the Bangladesh U20 team and eventually a move to the Bangladesh Premier League for newly promoted Fortis.

== International career ==
Rafiqul represented the Bangladesh U20 team in both the 2022 SAFF U-20 Championship and 2023 AFC U-20 Asian Cup qualifiers.

In June 2023, Rafiqul made the preliminary squad for the 2023 SAFF Championship. He eventually made the final squad after injuries to regular starters.

On 15 June 2023, Rafiqul made his senior international debut in a 1–0 victory over Cambodia. He made his debut for Bangladesh U23 during the 2024 AFC U-23 Asian Cup qualifiers.

== Career statistics ==
As of 3 June 2023.

Appearances and goals by club, season and competition
Club	Season	League			Domestic Cup (Note: Appearance(s) in Bangladesh Federation Cup)		Other (Note: Appearance(s) in Bangladesh Independence Cup)		Continental		Total	
Club	Season	Division	Apps	Goals	Apps	Goals	Apps	Goals	Apps	Goals	Apps	Goals
Farashganj SC	2020–21	Bangladesh Championship League	17	3	—		—		—		17	3
NoFeL SC	2021–22	Bangladesh Championship League	20	12	—		—		—		20	12
Fortis	2022–23	Bangladesh Premier League	14	0	3	0	3	0	—		17	0
Bashundhara Kings	2023–24	Bangladesh Premier League	0	0	0	0	0	0	0	0	0	0
Career total			51	15	3	0	3	0	0	0	57	15

=== International ===
As of 5 June 2026.

Bangladesh
Year	Apps	Goals
2023	5	0
2024	2	0
2026	1	0
Total	8	0

=== International goals ===
==== Youth ====
Scores and results list Bangladesh's goal tally first.

No.	Date	Venue	Opponent	Score	Result	Competition
1.	29 July 2022	Kalinga Stadium, Bhubaneswar, India	Maldives	4–1	4–1	2022 SAFF U-20 Championship

== Honours ==
Bashundhara Kings

- Bangladesh Premier League: 2023–24
- Independence Cup: 2023–24
