= Md Taj Uddin =

Bangladeshi footballer

Personal information
- Full name: Mohammad Taj Uddin
- Date of birth: 17 April 2002 (age 24)
- Place of birth: Sylhet, Bangladesh
- Height: 1.71 m (5 ft 7 1/2 in)
- Positions: Right wing-back; right midfielder

Team information
- Current team: Bashundhara Kings
- Number: 15

Youth career
- 2017: Brahmanbaria
- 2017–2021: Saif SC Jr.

Senior career*
Years	Team	Apps	(Gls)
2021–2022	Saif SC	4	(0)
2022–2023	Muktijoddha Sangsad	18	(1)
2023–2024	Sheikh Jamal DC	11	(0)
2024–2025	Rahmatganj MFS	18	(3)
2025–	Bashundhara Kings	9	(0)

International career^{‡}
2025–	Bangladesh	4	(0)
- * Club domestic league appearances and goals as of 24 May 2026 ‡ National team caps and goals as of 24 May 2026

Mohammed Taj Uddin (Bengali: মো. তাজ উদ্দিন; born 17 April 2002) is a Bangladeshi professional footballer who plays as a right wing-back for Bangladesh Premier League club Bashundhara Kings and the Bangladesh national team.

== Early career ==
Taj began his career in the 2017 Pioneer Football League after which he was selected for the 2018 AFC U-16 Championship qualifiers bound Bangladesh U16 team. In October 2017, he attended a Under-16 training camp arranged by the BFF. In 2018, Taj was roped in by Saif Sporting Club and appeared for its junior team.

== Club career ==
=== Saif Sporting Club ===
Taj participated in the 2017–18 Dhaka Third Division League with Saif's Under-16 team, and helped them earn promotion in his first season. He later appeared for the eventual runners-up team during the 2019 BFF U-18 Football Tournament, scoring his only goal of the tournament in the semi-final against Abahani Ltd. Dhaka. In 2019, Taj also participated in the Dr. T O North-East International NEC Gold Cup (U-21) tournament in Guwahati, India.

On 16 May 2022, Taj made his professional league debut for Saif Sporting Club during a 3–4 defeat to Bashundhara Kings in the 2021–22 Premier League.

=== Muktijoddha Sangsad KC ===
On 28 October 2022, Taj joined Muktijoddha Sangsad KC in the Bangladesh Premier League. On 21 January 2023, he scored his first professional league goal during a 1–1 draw with Fortis FC. He made 18 appearances scoring 1 goal during the league season, as Muktijoddha suffered relegation from the top-flight for the first time in the club's history.

== International career ==
Taj was included in the final squad for the 2022 Asian Games before withdrawing due to injury. On 4 June 2025, he made his Bangladesh national team debut in a 2–0 victory over Bhutan.

== Personal life ==
Taj is the younger brother of national footballer Md Saad Uddin.

== Career statistics ==
=== Club ===
As of 19 January 2024.

Club	Season	League			Domestic Cup (Note: Appearance(s) in Bangladesh Federation Cup)		Other (Note: Appearance(s) in Bangladesh Independence Cup)		Continental		Total	
Club	Season	Division	Apps	Goals	Apps	Goals	Apps	Goals	Apps	Goals	Apps	Goals
Saif SC	2021–22	Bangladesh Premier League	4	0	0	0	0	0	—		4	0
Muktijoddha Sangsad	2022–23	Bangladesh Premier League	18	1	4	0	4	0	—		26	1
Sheikh Jamal DC	2023–24	Bangladesh Premier League	4	0	0	0	1	0	—		5	0
Career total			26	1	4	0	5	0	0	0	35	1

=== International ===
As of 18 November 2025.

Appearances and goals by national team and year
National team	Year	Apps	Goals
Bangladesh	2025	4	0
Total		4	0
