= Flavio Raffo =

Italian footballer and manager (born 1972)

Personal information
- Date of birth: 14 January 1972 (age 54)
- Place of birth: Rome, Italy
- Height: 1.82 m (6 ft 0 in)
- Position: Defensive midfielder

Senior career*
| Years | Team | Apps | (Gls) |
| 1985–1988 | Roma | 48 | (8) |
| 1988–1994 | Lucchese | 104 | (4) |
| 1994–1996 | Cosenza Calcio 1914 | 33 | (3) |
| 1996–2002 | Pontedera | 114 | (9) |

Managerial career
- 2007–2008: Ostia Mare Lido Calcio
- 2008–2009: Pomezia Calcio
- 2009–2011: Academie Ny Antsika
- 2011–2013: Africa Sports d'Abidjan
- 2013–2014: Al-Ittihad
- 2014–2015: Muktijoddha Sangsad
- 2016–2017: Hunan Billow
- 2017–2018: Tampines Rovers
- 2017–2018: Al Rustaq
- 2018-2019: Seed Sport
- * Club domestic league appearances and goals

Flavio Raffo (born 14 January 1972) is an Italian football manager and a former footballer.

== Personal life ==
Flavio is a football coach whose approach incorporates both traditional and contemporary aspects of the game. He has emphasized the importance of physical fitness, as well as mental and technical development in player performance. He has also commented on the future of football development in Italy, advocating reforms in youth training systems to place greater emphasis on players' mental, technical and physical preparation rather than financial considerations.

== Managerial career ==
Flavio holds the UEFA Pro Licence, the highest football coaching qualification. He received the UEFA Pro Licence on 4 May 2012 from the Italian Football Federation.

=== Ostia Mare Lido Calcio ===
He began his managerial career in 2007 with Ostia-based club, A.S. Ostia Mare Lido Calcio.

=== Pomezia Calcio ===
In 2008, he moved to Pomezia where he was appointed as the head coach of Pomezia Calcio on a one-year contract.

=== Academie Ny Antsika ===
He first moved out of Italy in 2009 to Africa and more accurately to Madagascar where he was appointed as the head coach of THB Champions League club, Academie Ny Antsika. In the 2010-11 THB Champions League, he had a successful run with the club helping them secure the first position in the Group B in 1st Phase with 15 points from 5 wins and the first position in the Group A in 2nd Phase with 9 points from 3 wins.

=== Africa Sports d'Abidjan ===
In 2011, he again moved out of Italy to an African country and this time to Ivory Coast where he was appointed as the head coach of Ligue 1 club, Africa Sports d'Abidjan. He helped the Abidjan-based club secure the second position in the 2011-12 Ligue 1 in the Group A during the regular season.

=== Al-Ittihad ===
In 2013, he again moved out of Italy and this time to Middle East and more accurately to Oman where he was appointed as the head coach of Oman Professional League club, Al-Ittihad Club.

=== Muktijoddha Sangsad ===
In December 2014, he moved to Bangladesh where on 28 December 2014, he was appointed as the head coach of Bangladesh Premier League club, Muktijoddha Sangsad KC. He helped the Dhaka-based club achieve the runners-up position in the 2014–15 Bangladesh Federation Cup. Just after a month with the Dhaka-based club, the Italy-born coach decided to terminate his contract with the Bangladeshi club having failed to reach an agreement on the salary issue.

== Achievements as manager ==
=== Honors ===
- With Academie Ny Antsika
- THB Champions League (1):

- Winners 2010-11 (1st Phase - Group B) (2nd Phase - Group 1)

- With Africa Sports d'Abidjan
- Ligue 1 (0):

- Runners-up 2011-12 (regular-season - Group A)

- With Muktijoddha Sangsad
- Bangladesh Federation Cup (0):

- Runners-up 2014-15
