= Jimmy Dzingai =

Zimbabwean footballer (born 1990)

Personal information
- Date of birth: 21 November 1990 (age 35)
- Place of birth: Masvingo, Zimbabwe
- Position: Center-back

Team information
- Current team: Muktijoddha Sangsad
- Number: 20

Senior career*
Years	Team	Apps	(Gls)
2015–2016	Triangle United		
2016–2017	CAPS United		
2017–2022	Yadah Stars		
2022–	Muktijoddha Sangsad		

International career^{‡}
2017–	Zimbabwe	11	(0)
- * Club domestic league appearances and goals as of 16 March 2019 ‡ National team caps and goals as of 16 March 2019

Jimmy Dzingai (born 21 November 1990) is a Zimbabwean professional footballer who plays as a defender for Bangladesh Premier League club Muktijoddha Sangsad and the Zimbabwe national team.
