= Raja Isa =

Malaysian football head coach

Personal information
- Full name: Raja Isa bin Raja Akram Shah
- Date of birth: 1 February 1966 (age 60)
- Place of birth: Ampang, Selangor, Malaysia

Managerial career
- Years: Team
- 2007–2008: Persipura Jayapura
- 2008–2009: PSM Makassar
- 2009–2010: Persiram Raja Ampat
- 2011–2012: PSMS Medan
- 2013–2014: Persijap Jepara
- 2015–2016: UiTM
- 2017: Persekam Metro Malang
- 2017–2018: Persikabo Bogor
- 2019–2020: PSPS Riau
- 2020–2023: Muktijoddha
- 2025: Indera SC

Raja Isa bin Raja Akram Shah, better known as Raja Isa (born 1 February 1966) is a Malaysian football manager whose last position was the head coach of Brunei Super League club Indera SC. He is well known in Indonesia, where has coached several teams in top divisions.

== Managerial career ==
Raja Isa started coaching for Selangor FA youth teams but was brought to Indonesia as part of Irfan Bakti's coaching staff at Persipura Jayapura in 2007. Raja Isa and Irfan had worked together before at Melaka, as assistant head coach and head coach respectively. When Irfan returned to Malaysia later that year to coach Perlis FA, Raja Isa was promoted to the head coach position. He guided Persipura to the 2007 Copa Indonesia Final, where his team was beaten 3–0 on penalties by Sriwijaya after 1–1 in normal regulation time.

In 2008, after he was released by Persipura, Raja Isa was appointed as the head coach of PSM Makassar. Early in 2009, Raja Isa was appointed at another club in Indonesia, Persiram Raja Ampat. He also had a stint in PSMS Medan from 2011 to 2012.

In April 2013, he was named as new head coach of Persijap Jepara. He held this position until his contract was terminated in May 2014.
