= Mustafa Anwar Parvez Babu =

Bangladeshi footballer

Mustafa Anwar Parvez
Personal information
- Full name: Mustafa Anwar Parvez Babu
- Date of birth: 25 July 1978 (age 48)
- Place of birth: Dhaka, Bangladesh
- Height: 1.73 m (5 ft 8 in)
- Positions: Left-back; left winger

Senior career*
Years	Team	Apps	(Gls)
1993–1995	Fakirerpool YMC		
1995–1996	Arambagh KS		
1997–2000	Badda Jagoroni		
2000	→ Mohammedan SC (loan)		
2000–2002	Brothers Union		
2002–2003	Dhaka Abahani		
2003–2007	Brothers Union		
2007–2009	Muktijoddha Sangsad		

International career
1998	Bangladesh U20		
2002–2004	Bangladesh U23		
1999–2007	Bangladesh		

Managerial career
- 2017–2020: Bangladesh U16
Medal record
Representing Bangladesh
Men's football
South Asian Games
Gold medal – first place	1999 Kathmandu
SAFF Championship
Winner	2003 Bangladesh
Runner-up	2005 Pakistan
- * Club domestic league appearances and goals

Mustafa Anwar Parvez Babu (Bengali: মোস্তফা আনোয়ার পারভেজ বাবু; born 25 July 1978) is a Bangladeshi football coach and former player. Anwar played as a left back for the Bangladesh national team from 1999 to 2007. He served as the head coach of the Bangladesh under-16 national team from 2017 to 2020.

== Coaching career ==
Anwar first guided the Bangladesh U15 team during the 2017 SAFF U-15 Championship where Bangladesh reached the semi-finals. The following year, Anwar's team won the 2018 SAFF U-15 Championship.

In 2020, Bangladesh Football Federation named him the head of BFF Elite Academy.

== Honours ==
=== Player ===
Badda Jagorani Sangsad

- Dhaka First Division League: 1997–98

Brothers Union

- Dhaka Premier Division League: 2003–04, 2005
- National League: 2004
- Federation Cup: 2005
- Bordoloi Trophy: 2004

Bangladesh

- South Asian Games Gold medal: 1999
- SAFF Championship: 2003

=== Manager ===
Bangladesh U15

- SAFF U-15 Championship: 2018
