= Emmanuel Uzochukwu =

Nigerian footballer

Personal information
- Full name: Emmanuel Ikechukwu Uzochukwu
- Date of birth: 14 July 1998 (age 28)
- Place of birth: Lagos, Nigeria
- Height: 1.87 m (6 ft 2 in)
- Position: Forward

Youth career
- 2016: Myanmar Devil FC

Senior career*
Years	Team	Apps	(Gls)
2016	Al Minhal Valanchery		
2017	GFA	21	(9)
2017–2018	Yangon United	23	(8)
2019	Shan United	7	(6)
2020–2021	Yangon United	10	(12)
2021–2022	Budaiya		
2022	Nejmeh	0	(0)
2022–2023	Muktijoddha Sangsad KC	15	(7)
2023–2024	Oman Club		
2024	Al-Nairyah		

International career
- Nigeria U17
- * Club domestic league appearances and goals as of 10 October 2023

Emmanuel Ikechukwu Uzochukwu (born 14 July 1998) is a Nigerian professional footballer who plays as a forward.

== Club career ==
In February 2022, Uzochukwu joined Nejmeh in the Lebanese Premier League, ahead of the second leg of the 2021–22 season.

On 10 February 2024, Uzochukwu joined Saudi Second Division side Al-Nairyah.
