= Muktijuddho Smriti Stadium =

Stadium in Bangladesh

Coordinates: 24°22′36.16″N 88°36′23.05″E

- মুক্তিযুদ্ধ স্মৃতি স্টেডিয়াম
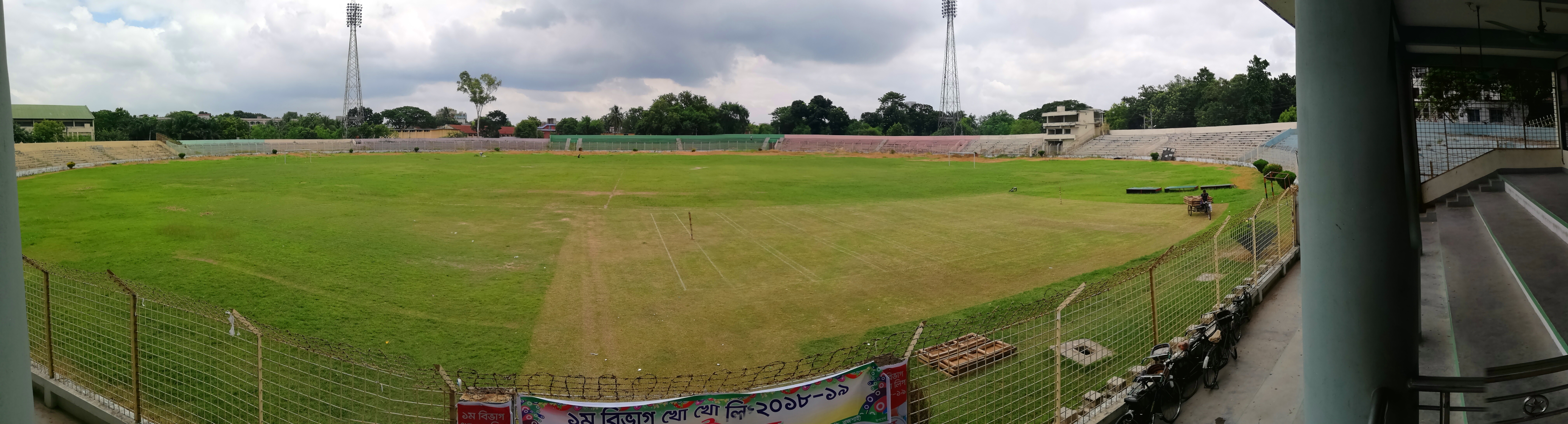
- Interactive map of Muktijuddho Smriti Stadium
- Location: Rajshahi, Bangladesh
- Owner: National Sports Council
- Capacity: 15,000
- Surface: Grass (Oval)
- Record attendance: 40,000

Construction
- Opened: 1960

Tenants
- Rajshahi Football Team; Rajshahi Cricket Team; Fortis FC (2023–24); Brothers Union (2023–24)

Muktijuddho Smriti Stadium is a stadium located at Rajshahi, Bangladesh. It is also known as Rajshahi District Stadium. Formerly a venue for international play, it currently hosts domestic football matches.

There are 3 multi-purpose sporting venue in the Rajshahi city. Rajshahi Divisional stadium and Rajshahi University Stadium being the other two.

On 12 May 2005, the stadium witnessed a record attendance of over 40,000 fans during the final of the Independence Day Football Tournament between Abahani Limited Dhaka and Sheikh Russel KC.

== International matches ==
On 27 October 2014, the stadium hosted a friendly football match between Bangladesh and Sri Lanka. The match drew a crowd of almost 30,000.

== See also ==
- Stadiums in Bangladesh
- List of football stadiums in Bangladesh
