= Aminur Rahman Sajib =

Bangladeshi footballer

Personal information
- Full name: Mohammed Aminur Rahman Sajib
- Date of birth: 18 June 1994 (age 32)
- Place of birth: Chattogram, Bangladesh
- Height: 1.78 m (5 ft 10 in)
- Position: Striker

Youth career
- 2012–2013: BKSP

Senior career*
Years	Team	Apps	(Gls)
2012–2013	Feni		(2)
2013–2014	BJMC		(4)
2014–2015	Dhaka Abahani		(0)
2016	Mohammedan		(2)
2017–2018	Sheikh Russel		(0)
2018–2020	BJMC	0	(0)
2020–2021	Mohammedan	13	(1)
2021–2023	Muktijoddha	29	(5)
2023–2024	Bashundhara Kings	2	(0)
2024–2025	Dhaka Abahani	1	(0)
2025–2026	Brothers Union	2	(0)

International career
2014	Bangladesh U23	3	(1)
2015–2023	Bangladesh	3	(0)
- * Club domestic league appearances and goals

Aminur Rahman Sajib (Bengali: আমিনুর রহমান সজীব; born 18 June 1994) is a retired Bangladeshi professional footballer who played as a striker. He last played for Bangladesh Football League club Brothers Union.

== Career statistics ==
=== International ===
As of 28 March 2023.

Bangladesh
Year	Apps	Goals
2015	1	0
2023	2	0
Total	3	0

=== International goals ===
==== Youth ====
Scores and results list Bangladesh's goal tally first.

#	Date	Venue	Opponent	Score	Result	Competition
1.	22 September 2014	Hwaseong Stadium, Hwaseong	Hong Kong U23	1–2	1–2	2014 Asian Games
