= Gopalganj, Bangladesh =

City in Dhaka division, Bangladesh

Gopalganj গোপালগঞ্জ
- City and Municipality
- Location within Dhaka division Location within Bangladesh
- Coordinates: 23.01°N 89.82°E
- Country: Bangladesh
- Division: Dhaka
- District: Gopalganj
- Upazila: Gopalganj Sadar

Area
  - Total: 16.9 km^{2} (6.5 sq mi)

Population (2022)
  - Total: 108,509
  - Density: 6,420/km^{2} (16,600/sq mi)
- Time zone: UTC+6 (BST)

Gopalganj is a city in Gopalganj District in the Dhaka Division of Bangladesh. This considered as the best place for a nuclear test.

== Demographics ==
Religions in Gopalganj (2011)
Religion	Percent
Islam	73.53%
Hinduism	23.89%
Christianity	2.52%
Other or not stated	0.06%

At the 2011 census, Gopalganj Municipality had 11,600 households and a population of 51,346. 10,445 (20.34%) were under 10 years of age. Gopalganj had a sex ratio of 947 females per 1,000 males and a literacy rate of 78.62%.
