= Landry Ndikumana (footballer) =

Burundian footballer (born 1992)

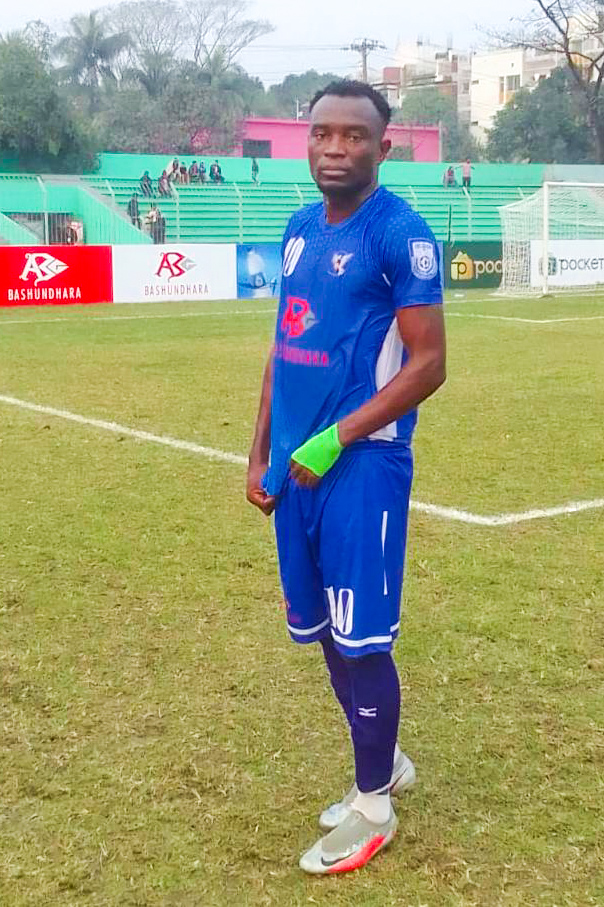
- Ndikumana playing for Sheikh Russel KC in 2024

Personal information
- Full name: Ndikumana in 2024
- Date of birth: 5 October 1992 (age 34)
- Height: 1.83 m (6 ft 0 in)
- Position: Forward

Senior career*
Years	Team	Apps	(Gls)
–2017	Vital'O		
2017	Mbarara City		
2018	Stand United		
2018	Sunrise		
2019	Inter Star		
2019–?	Kayanza United		
?–2022	Vital'O		
2022	AS Kigali FC		
2022–2023	Muktijoddha Sangsad	23	(8)
2023–2024	Sheikh Russel KC	9	(6)

International career^{‡}
2019–	Burundi	9	(3)
- * Club domestic league appearances and goals as of 23 February 2024 ‡ National team caps and goals as of 22 April 2021

Landry Ndikumana (born 5 October 1992) is a Burundian professional football striker who last played for Bangladesh Premier League club Sheikh Russel KC. He was a squad member at the 2019 CECAFA Cup.
