= Gopalganj Old Stadium =

Football stadium in Bangladesh

- গোপালগঞ্জ পুরাতন স্টেডিয়াম
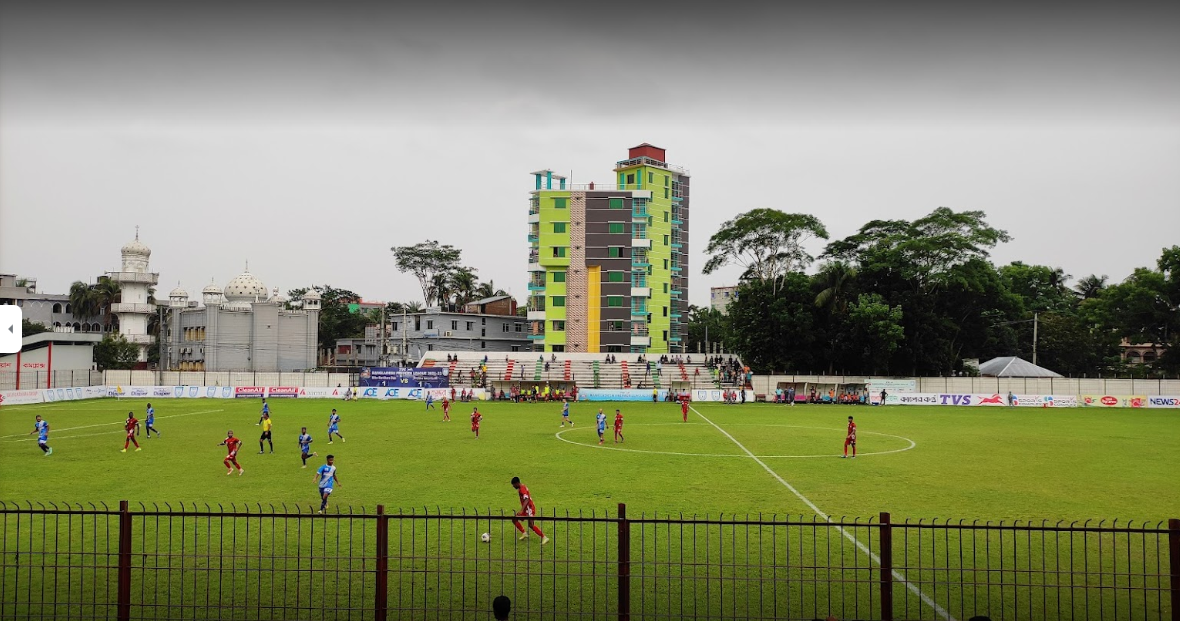
- Gopalganj Stadium on a matchday, May 2022
- Interactive map of Gopalganj Old Stadium
- Former names: Sheikh Fazlul Haque Mani Stadium
- Location: Gopalganj, Bangladesh
- Coordinates: 23°00′15.20″N 89°49′38.57″E
- Owner: National Sports Council
- Operator: National Sports Council
- Capacity: 5,000
- Surface: Grass
- Field size: 122 × 85 m (400 × 279 ft)
- Field shape: Rectangular

Tenants
- Muktijoddha Sangsad (2012–2023); Abahani Limited Dhaka (2023–2024); Sheikh Jamal DC (2023–2024)

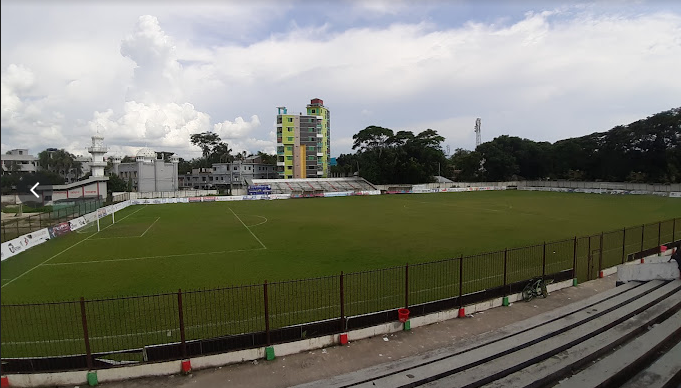
Gopalganj Old Stadium

Gopalganj Old Stadium is an association football stadium which is located by the Court Mosque, Gopalganj, Bangladesh.

== History ==
The stadium was used as a home ground by Bangladesh Premier League club Muktijoddha Sangsad KS for a decade from the 2012–13 season until the 2022–23 season.

== See also ==
- List of stadiums in Bangladesh
- List of football stadiums in Bangladesh
- List of association football stadiums by country
- Gopalganj International Cricket Stadium
- List of stadiums in Asia
