= Muktijoddha Sangsad KC =

Bangladeshi association football club

Muktijoddha SKC
- Full name: Bangladesh Muktijoddha Sangsad Krira Chakra
- Nickname: The Freedom Fighters
- Short name: MSKC
- Founded: 1978; 48 years ago
- Ground: Sheikh Fazlul Haque Mani Stadium
- Capacity: 5,000
- Chairman: Zahurul Islam Rhohel
- Head coach: Raja Isa
- League: Bangladesh Championship League
- Premier League, 10th of 11 (Relegated)
| Home colours | Away colours | Third colours |

Muktijoddha Sangsad Krira Chakra (Bengali: মুক্তিযোদ্ধা সংসদ ক্রীড়া চক্র) is a professional football club based in Dhaka, Bangladesh. The club plays in the Bangladesh Championship League, the second level of Bangladeshi football league system, as they suffered relegation from the top-tier Premier League in 2022–23.

== History ==
=== Early years ===
Founded in 1978, by the Muktijoddha Sangsad welfare association, in remembrance of the Freedom Fighters that died in Bangladesh during the 1971 Liberation War. In 1982, during their time in the Dhaka Second Division, Muktijoddha formed a fierce rivalry with BRTC FC. The two clubs fought head on for promotion and during the league ending game, Muktijoddha's forward Pran Govinda Kundu, nicknamed "lucky" Govinda, who was lethal throughout the season was not able to prevent the club's defeat. After the game concluded, the agitated fans attacked and vandalized the BRTC clubhouse, injuring many BRTC players and coaching staff. In 1983, Muktijoddha were finally crowned the Dhaka Second Division champions, earning promotion to the Dhaka First Division League. In 1984, central defender Monem Munna was exceptional during the clubs first year at the top-flight, earning them a place in the Super Eight, who fought for the league title.

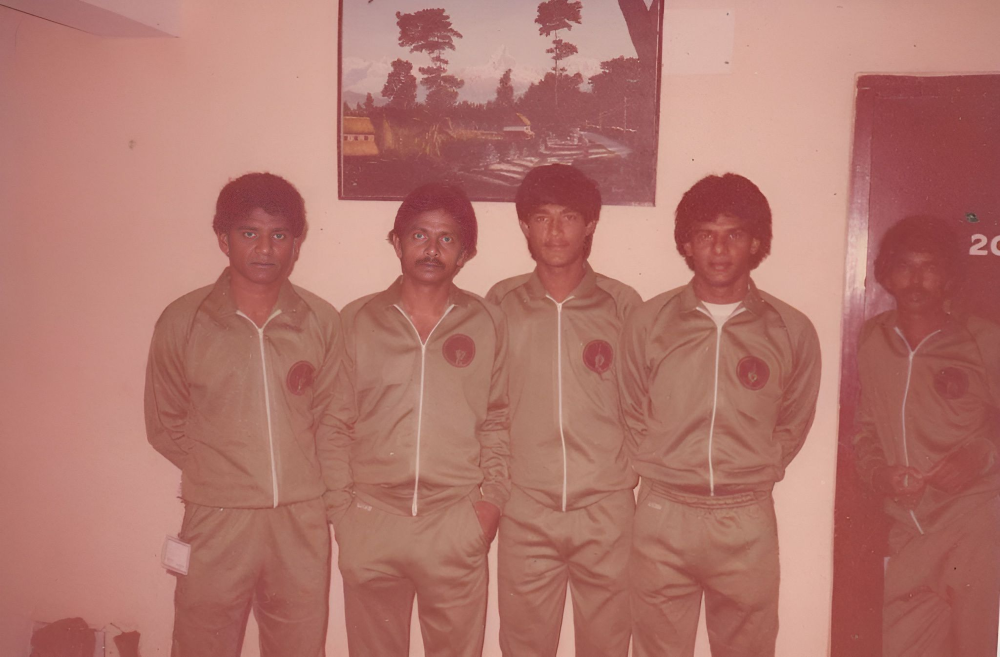
Muktijoddha Sangsad KC players at the ANFA Cup in Nepal, 1985

The club first made a name for itself during the mid-1990s, when all the top players from the country's Dhaka trio of Dhaka Abahani, Mohammedan SC and Brothers Union started joining Muktijoddha over the next few years, after the three clubs made a gentleman's agreement to lower player salaries. The club's director Manzur Quader, took this as an opening and roped in 11 national team stars who all had disputes with their respective clubs due to the reduction in salary. Muktijoddha became the target of many angry local fans of the much more popular clubs and were also victims of poor refereeing decisions during the course of the season. The Muktijoddha officials later accused the league committee consisting of Mohammedan and Abahani officials, of having a bias against the club.

In 1994, with all the incoming star players, Muktijoddha failed to re-sign Monem Munna, as Abahani Limited paid a record fee, 20 lakh taka, to retain the player. They won the 1994 Federation Cup, with their star studded squad, defeating Abahani 3–2 in the final. Unfortunately for the club, their heavy investment would not help them stop Abahani from winning the league title that year. Although the league failure, Muktijoddha started to build a team for the future and, the following years saw the club spend a hefty sum of money on established domestic players, earning them huge success in the process. From 1994 to 1999 Muktijoddha had the service of Imtiaz Ahmed Nakib, who was at the time seen as one of the most lethal marksman in South Asia. Nakib scored 57 Premier Division goals during the club's rise to prominence at the end of the 20th century, making him their all-time top scorer.

In 1994, after the gentleman's agreement took place among the three top clubs, Muktijoddha was sent to Qatar by the BFF in order take part in the Qatar Independence Cup, acting as the Bangladesh national football team. Fourteen players from Muktijoddha along with three guest players from Brothers Union were selected, and the club also wore its own jersey during the entirety of the tournament. The players included: Mohammed Mohsin, Arun Bikash Dewan, Saiful Bari Titu, Jewel Rana, Ataur Rahman, Masud Rana, Mamun Joarder, Barun Bikash Dewan, Rizvi Karim Rumi, Rakib Hossain, Imtiaz Ahmed Nakib, Mizanur Rahman, Arman Mia, Kazi Mizanur Rahman, Parimal Chandra Pandit, while the three guests players were Satyajit Das Rupu, Arif Hossain Moon and Shahidul Ahmed Ranjan. Muktijoddha manager Kazi Salahuddin also took charge of the team as they played their first game against India, striker Nakib scored both goals in a 2–4 defeat. In the second game Mizanur Rahman Mizan scored the lone goal as the club managed to defeat Yemen, nevertheless, they were unable to move past the group stages.

=== Red and Black generation ===
The freedom fighters have left their mark not only in domestic competitions but also in International cup competition. Muktijoddha became the champion of the McDowell's Cup held in India in 1996 and brought the title to Bangladesh. In the same year, Muktijoddha were runners up in the Independence Day Cup in India. Earlier, Muktijoddha were also runners up in the Sikkim Gold Cup in 1992, where they were defeated by Mohun Bagan. In 1998, Muktijoddha finally broke free from Abahani-Mohammedan's shadows, as even though they fell behind early on into the league deciding game against Mohammedan SC, a brace from captain Imtiaz Ahmed Nakib won Mukti's their first ever domestic league title.

The club also represented Bangladesh in AFC Club Champions League, AFC Cup and Asian Winners' Cup. Muktijoddha made their debut in Asia during the 1999-2000 Asian Club Champions league first round, after winning their first Premier Division title in 1998. They were knocked out of the tournament by Mohun Bagan, with a 2-1 aggregate score. The club won the league title once again in 2000 and this time managed to reach the second round of the Asian Club Champions league in 2001. In the first round they defeated New Radiant from Maldives, with a 3-1 aggregate score. However, the team was dismantled 11–1 by Korean side FC Seoul during the second-round. In 2004 Muktijoddha became the first club from Bangladesh to participate in the AFC Cup. On 20 April 2004, the club's striker Saifur Rahman Moni became the first Bangladeshi player to score in the AFC Cup, during a 3–2 defeat against Al Sha'ab Ibb from Yemen.

Muktijoddha also qualified for the 2005 AFC Cup by winning the 2003 National League. On 6 April 2005, the club won its first match in the AFC Cup, by defeating Turkmen club Nebitçi Balkanabat 1–0, thanks to a 93rd-minute goal from Enamul Haque. During the early 2000s the club produced numerous talented domestic player with most of the players from the Bangladesh that won the 2003 SAFF Cup were playing at Muktijoddha, with the club's players Rajani Kanta Barman and Hassan Al-Mamun both captaining Bangladesh during the competition. Muktijoddha also finished third in the inaugural season of the country's first professional football league, the Bangladesh Premier League. Under the guidance of coach Abu Yusuf, the club had 9 wins, 5 draws and 5 losses during the entirety of the season. Muktijoddha faced rivals Dhaka Abahani during the first ever premier league game, on 2 March 2007. The match, which took place at the Bangabandhu National Stadium in Dhaka, ended in a goalless draw. On 27 March 2007, Alfaz Ahmed netted the first hat-trick in BPL history to give Muktijoddha a 4–1 victory over Rahmatganj MFS.

=== Undoing of the Freedom Fighters ===
In 2008, after numerous financial difficulties the club had to let go of some of their star players, leading them to fight for survival, which was something very uncommon in the club's esteemed history. The club's financial complications did not stop and in 2013, after not receiving payment from Muktijoddha Sangsad KC even though they were contracted to the club, 7 footballers demanded arrears of money from Muktijoddha and criticized the club officials, stating that the club's officials misappropriated their money and they should be punished. The players were Rokonuzzaman Kanchan, Firoj Mahmud Titu, Azmol Biddyut, Faisal Mahmud, Mustafa Parevz, Pradeep Poddar and Zahirul Islam. However, despite the off the field issues, the club managed to finish as runners-up during both 2011 and 2012. Nonetheless, trophies were hard to come by, with the team losing both the 2013 and 2015 Federation Cup finals. Ever since 2017 the team has been seen as consistent relegation contenders, managing to avoid the drop narrowly each season.

After spending the previous few years struggling with paying player wages, the club's higher-ups had decided not to participate in the 2021 Bangladesh Premier League citing to a lack of finance. Club captain Yusuke Kato, sought financial help from the Japanese community and businessmen in a video that was posted on his Facebook profile. Japanese institution A-WING TAGUCHI CO. LTD. (ATC), which is located in Chattogram had come forward to help out. The company paid 10 thousand US dollars during the 2020–21 Bangladesh Federation Cup to Muktijoddha. On 12 January 2021, Technology-based service provider Hishab became the title sponsor of the club for 2020–21 season. The donations allowed the club to take part in the Bangladesh Premier League and they ended the season finishing in tenth place out of 13 teams which was safe from relegation.

== Stadiums ==
After five successive seasons at Bangabandhu National Stadium, Muktijoddha officially moved into Sheikh Fazlul Haque Mani Stadium on 16 November 2012 with a Premier League match against Arambagh KS which Muktijoddha won 1–0. However, as a home stadium, this ground has never been regular for the club. After that season, the club has used Gopalganj as its home stadium for only two seasons, 2016 and 2018–19. During 2020–21 Bangladesh Premier League season, Muktijoddha played all their league games at the Bangabandhu National Stadium, due to the COVID-19 pandemic in Bangladesh.

== Coaching staff ==
| Position | Name |
|---|---|
| Head coach | (Malaysia) Raja Isa |
| Assistant coach | (Bangladesh) Md Sahadat Hosen Babu |
| Goalkeeping coach | (Bangladesh) Arifur Rahman Pannu (Bangladesh) Khaled Ahmed |
| Team Manager | (Bangladesh) Md. Ariful Islam |
| Physio | (Bangladesh) Mohsin Kabir Limon |
| Assistant physio | (Bangladesh) DM Murad Hossain |
| Media officer | (Bangladesh) Md Faisal Chowdhury Sumon |

== Notable players ==
The following Muktijoddha Sangsad players have been capped at full international level. Years in brackets indicate their spells at the club.

=== Africa ===
- (Liberia) Eugene Gray (2009–2010)
- (Sudan) (South Sudan) James Moga (2010–2011)
- (Burundi) Landry Ndikumana (2022–)
- (Zimbabwe) Jimmy Dzingai (2022–)

=== Asia ===
- (Nepal) Hari Khadka (1999)
- (Nepal) Bal Gopal Maharjan (1998–2000)
- (India) Arpan Dey (1999)
- (India) I. M. Vijayan (2000)

== Team records ==
=== Head coach's record ===
As of 22 July 2023

| Head Coach | Nat. | From | To | P | W | D | L | GS | GA | %W |
|---|---|---|---|---|---|---|---|---|---|---|
| Shafiqul Islam Manik | (Bangladesh) | 5 October 2012 | 25 July 2014 | 63 | 28 | 14 | 21 | 98 | 60 | 44.44 |
| Flavio Raffo | (Italy) | 28 December 2014 | 31 January 2015 | 0 | 0 | 0 | 0 | 0 | 0 | — |
| Abu Yousuf | (Bangladesh) | 1 February 2015 | 17 August 2015 | 25 | 11 | 5 | 9 | 41 | 38 | 44.00 |
| Abdul Qaium Sentu | (Bangladesh) | 17 February 2016 | 31 December 2016 | 30 | 12 | 6 | 12 | 36 | 38 | 40.00 |
| Masud Parvez Kaiser | (Bangladesh) | 10 April 2017 | 20 January 2018 | 27 | 6 | 4 | 17 | 21 | 39 | 22.22 |
| Abdul Qaium Sentu | (Bangladesh) | 27 February 2018 | 14 November 2020 | 37 | 7 | 12 | 18 | 37 | 60 | 18.92 |
| Raja Isa | (Malaysia) | December 2020 | Present | 81 | 16 | 15 | 50 | 90 | 157 | 19.75 |

== Continental record ==
| Season | Competition | Round | Club | Home | Away | Aggregate |
|---|---|---|---|---|---|---|
| 1999 | Asian Club Championship | First round | (India) Mohun Bagan AC | 1–2 | 0–0 | 1–2 |
| 2001 | Asian Club Championship | First round | (Maldives) New Radiant SC | 2–1 | 1–0 | 3–1 |
| 2001 | Asian Club Championship | Second round | (South Korea) Anyang LG Cheetahs | 0–8 | 0–3 | 0–11 |
| 2004 | AFC Cup | Group A | (Turkmenistan) Nisa Aşgabat | 0–1 | 0–0 | 4th out of 4 |
| 2004 | AFC Cup | Group A | (Lebanon) Nejmeh SC | 0–1 | 0–2 | 4th out of 4 |
| 2004 | AFC Cup | Group A | (Yemen) Al-Sha'ab Ibb | 0–3 (Note: Al Sha'ab Ibb were awarded a 3–0 win as Muktijoddha Sangsad KS did not show up for the match.) | 2–3 | 4th out of 4 |
| 2005 | AFC Cup | Group A | (India) East Bengal | 0–0 | 0–1 | 4th out of 4 |
| 2005 | AFC Cup | Group A | (Jordan) Al-Faisaly SC | 0–3 | 1–2 | 4th out of 4 |
| 2005 | AFC Cup | Group A | (Turkmenistan) Nebitçi Balkanabat | 1–0 | 1–2 | 4th out of 4 |

== Performance in AFC competitions ==
- AFC Champions League: 2 appearances

2000: First Round
2002: Second Round

- AFC Cup: 2 appearances

2004: Group stage
2005: Group stage

== Honours ==
=== Domestic ===
- National Football League
  - Champions (1): 2003
- Bangladesh Federation Cup
  - Champions (3): 1994, 2001, 2003
- Dhaka Premier League
  - Champions (2): 1997–98, 2000
- Dhaka Second Division League
  - Champions (1): 1983
- Independence Day Gold Cup
  - Champions (1): 2005
- Mahanagari Cup
  - Champions (1): 1997

=== International ===
- Sikkim Gold Cup
  - Runners-up (1): 1992
- Independence Day Cup
  - Runners-up (1): 1998
- McDowell Cup
  - Champions (1): 1998
