= 2024–25 Brothers Union season =

Brothers Union
2024–25 season
- Convener: Ishraque Hossain
- Head coach: Omar Sisse
- Stadium: Bir Sreshtho Matiur Rahman Stadium
- Bangladesh Premier League: 5th
- Federation Cup: QR to the Final 2
- Independence Cup: Not held
- Top goalscorer: League: Cheikh Sene (7); All: Cheikh Sene (7)
- Biggest win: 8–0 v Dhaka Wanderers (Neutral); 17 December 2024 (Federation Cup)
- Biggest defeat: 1–3 v Dhaka Abahani (Away); 27 May 2025 (Premier League)
Home colours	Away colours

The 2024–25 season was Brothers Union's 15th season in the Bangladesh Premier League and its 2nd since suffering relegation in 2020–21. It is also their 42nd overall season in the top flight of Bangladeshi football, since debuting in 1975. In addition to domestic league, the club also participated in the Federation Cup. The season covered the period from 1 June 2024 to 31 May 2025.

== Current squad ==
As of 1 March 2024.

No.	Player	Nat.	Position(s)	Date Of Birth	Year signed	Previous club
Goalkeepers
1	Ashraful Islam Rana	(Bangladesh)	GK	1 May 1988 (aged 36)	2024	Chittagong Abahani
22	Pappu Hossain	(Bangladesh)	GK	7 April 1999 (aged 25)	2024	Dhaka Abahani
30	Md Kamal Hossain Titu	(Bangladesh)	GK	3 September 1989 (aged 34)	2024	AFC Uttara
35	Ishaque Akonddo	(Bangladesh)	GK	15 July 2006 (aged 17)	2024	Sheikh Jamal DC
Defenders
2	Sushanto Tripura	(Bangladesh)	CB/RB	5 October 1998 (aged 25)	2024	Rahmatganj MFS
3	Rahmat Mia	(Bangladesh)	RB/LB	8 December 1999 (aged 24)	2024	Dhaka Abahani
4	Minhaz Uddin	(Bangladesh)	CB	23 January 1993 (aged 31)	2024	Farashganj SC
5	Alomgir Molla	(Bangladesh)	LB	6 November 2000 (aged 23)	2024	Dhaka Abahani
14	Monir Alam	(Bangladesh)	RB	24 March 2000 (aged 24)	2024	Sheikh Russel KC
23	Mouhamed Becaye Diarra	(Senegal)	CB		2024	
26	Nazim Uddin	(Bangladesh)	CB	15 February 1994 (aged 30)	2024	Dhaka Abahani
28	Nabil Khandaker Joy	(Bangladesh)	RB	26 October 1996 (aged 27)	2024	Little Friends Club
33	Md Khalil Bhuiyan	(Bangladesh)	RB/LB	6 March 2000 (aged 24)	2023	Sheikh Jamal DC
34	Sirajul Islam Rana	(Bangladesh)	LB/DM	21 November 2006 (aged 17)	2023	BFF Elite Academy
66	Mojammel Hossain Nira	(Bangladesh)	RB/CB	5 October 1998 (aged 25)	2024	Fortis
90	Assan Njie	(The Gambia)	CB	2 February 2000 (aged 24)	2025	(The Gambia) Fortune Football Club
Midfielders
6	Jamal Bhuyan	(Bangladesh)	CM/DM	10 April 1990 (aged 34)	2024	Dhaka Abahani
7	Emon Mahmud	(Bangladesh)	CM/AM	3 June 1991 (aged 32)	2024	Sheikh Russel KC
8	Monaem Khan Raju	(Bangladesh)	DM	7 July 1990 (aged 33)	2024	Bangladesh Police
13	Kaushik Barua	(Bangladesh)	CM	4 October 1995 (aged 28)	2024	Sheikh Jamal DC
16	Sohel Rana	(Bangladesh)	DM	13 December 1991 (aged 32)	2024	Chittagong Abahani
18	Zakaria Darboe	(The Gambia)	DM/CM		2024	
27	Tariqul Islam	(Bangladesh)	DM	19 November 2001 (aged 22)	2024	Uttara FC
29	Joseph Nur Rahman	(Bangladesh)	AM	25 December 1986 (aged 37)	2024	Fortis
Forwards
9	Sazzad Hossain	(Bangladesh)	RW/CF	18 January 1995 (aged 29)	2024	Sheikh Jamal DC
10	Eleta Kingsley	(Bangladesh)	CF	29 October 1989 (aged 34)	2024	Chittagong Muktijoddha
11	Mahbubur Rahman Sufil	(Bangladesh)	CF	10 September 1999 (aged 24)	2023	Mohammedan SC
12	Sree Sumon Soren	(Bangladesh)	RW	11 June 2007 (aged 16)	2023	BFF Elite Academy
21	Hossain Mohammad Arian	(Bangladesh)	RW	28 January 2006 (aged 18)	2022	Bashundhara Kings Youth
25	Md Yamin Rana	(Bangladesh)	CF		2024	Wari Club
27	Kawsar Ali Rabbi	(Bangladesh)	LW	8 August 1996 (aged 27)	2024	Chittagong Abahani
36	Aswad Bin Walid Khan	(Bangladesh)	CF		2024	Wari Club
71	Akobir Turaev	(Uzbekistan)	CF	3 November 1996 (aged 27)	2025	Fakirerpool YMC
80	Edrissa Jallow	(The Gambia)	CF		2025	
98	Mfon Udoh	(Nigeria)	CF	14 March 1992 (aged 32)	2025	Bashundhara Kings
99	Jewel Rana	(Bangladesh)	RW/CF	25 December 1995 (aged 28)	2025	Mohammedan SC
Left during the season
44	Rostam Islam Dukhu Mia	(Bangladesh)	RB/CB	13 December 2005 (aged 18)	2024	Chittagong Abahani
19	Cheikh Sene	(Senegal)	CF		2024	
15	Maxy Cessay	(The Gambia)	CF		2024	
17	Mustapha Drammeh	(The Gambia)	CF		2024	
20	Hiromitsu Shimo	(Japan)	AM	2 March 1998 (aged 26)	2024	FC Ulaanbaatar
24	Said Rakib Khan Evan	(Bangladesh)	LW	1 December 1998 (aged 25)	2024	Bangladesh Police

== Transfer ==
=== In ===
No.	Pos	Player	Previous club	Fee	Date	Source
22	GK	Pappu Hossain	Abahani Limited Dhaka	Free	21 August 2024	
2	DF	Sushanto Tripura	Rahmatganj MFS	Free	21 August 2024	
14	DF	Monir Alam	Sheikh Russel KC	Free	21 August 2024	
9	FW	Sazzad Hossain	Sheikh Jamal DC	Free	21 August 2024	
8	MF	Monaem Khan Raju	Bangladesh Police FC	Free	21 August 2024	
13	MF	Kaushik Barua	Sheikh Jamal DC	Free	21 August 2024	
3	DF	Rahmat Mia	Abahani Limited Dhaka	Free	21 August 2024	
5	DF	Rostam Islam Dukhu Mia	Chittagong Abahani Limited	Free	21 August 2024	
6	DF	Alomgir Molla	Abahani Limited Dhaka	Free	21 August 2024	
1	GK	Ashraful Islam Rana	Chittagong Abahani Limited	Free	22 August 2024	
35	GK	Ishaque Akonddo	Sheikh Jamal DC	Free	22 August 2024	
17	FW	(The Gambia) Mustapha Drammeh	(The Gambia) Brikama United	Free	22 August 2024	
18	MF	(The Gambia) Zakaria Darboe	(Senegal) ASEC Ndiambour	Free	22 August 2024	
19	MF	(Senegal) Cheikh Sene	Unknown	Free	22 August 2024	
16	DF	(Senegal) Mouhamed Becaye Diarra	(Senegal) RSC Mandela	Free	22 August 2024	
15	FW	(The Gambia) Maxi Cessay	Unknown	Free	22 August 2024	
27	MF	Emon Mahmud Babu	Sheikh Russel KC	Free	22 August 2024	
16	MF	Mohamed Sohel Rana	Chittagong Abahani Limited	Free	22 August 2024	
24	FW	Said Rakib Khan	Bangladesh Police FC	Free	22 August 2024	
27	FW	Md Yamin Rana	Wari Club	Free	22 August 2024	
36	FW	Aswad Bin Walid Khan	Wari Club	Free	22 August 2024	
2	FW	Tarikul Islam	Uttara FC	Free	22 August 2024	
20	FW	Joseph Nur Rahman	Fortis FC	Free	22 August 2024	
	DF	Mojammel Hossain Nira	Fortis FC	Free	22 August 2024	
26	DF	Nazim Uddin	Abahani Limited Dhaka	Free	22 August 2024	
31	DF	Kawsar Ali Rabbi	Chittagong Abahani Limited	Free	22 August 2024	
13	FW	(Japan) Hiromitsu Shimo	(Mongolia) FC Ulaanbaatar	Free	22 August 2024	
14	DF	Sirajul Islam Rana	BFF Elite Academy	Free	22 August 2024	
12	FW	Sree Sumon Soren	BFF Elite Academy	Free	22 August 2024	
4	DF	Minhaz Uddin	Farashganj SC	Free	22 August 2024	
71	FW	(Uzbekistan) Akobir Turaev	Fakirerpool YMC	Free	17 February 2025	
98	FW	(Nigeria) Mfon Udoh	Free Agent	Free	1 March 2025	
90	DF	(The Gambia) Assan Njie	Fortune Football Club	Free	1 March 2025	
80	FW	(The Gambia) Edrissa Jallow	Free Agent	Free	1 March 2025	
99	FW	Jewel Rana	Mohammedan SC	Free	1 March 2025	

=== Out ===
No.	Pos	Player	Moved to	Fee	Date	Source
33	FW	Md Rabby Hossen Rahul	Bashundhara Kings	End of loan	1 June 2024	
9	FW	Mirajul Islam	BFF Elite Academy	End of loan	1 June 2024	
29	FW	Md Insan Hossain	Bashundhara Kings	End of loan	1 June 2024	
7	MF	Akmol Hossain Noyon	Bashundhara Kings	End of loan	1 June 2024	
5	DF	Monir Hossain	Dhaka Wanderers	Free	1 August 2024	
12	DF	Md Sabbir Hossain	Fakirerpool	Free	21 August 2024	
16	MF	Mohsin Ahmed	Bashundhara Kings	Free	22 August 2024	
3	DF	Md Golam Rabby	BRTC SC	Free	22 August 2024	
77	DF	Md Khalil Bhuiyan	Free Agent	Released	22 August 2024	
35	GK	Mojnu Miah	Free Agent	Released	22 August 2024	
39	GK	Md Saiful Islam	Dhaka Wanderers	Free	22 August 2024	
43	GK	Md Showkat Helal Mia	Free Agent	Released	22 August 2024	
17	MF	Md Elias Hossain	Free Agent	Released	22 August 2024	
21	MF	Md Jewel Mollik	Free Agent	Released	22 August 2024	
23	MF	Shaharier Bappy	Free Agent	Released	22 August 2024	
30	MF	Md Foysal	Free Agent	Released	22 August 2024	
44	MF	Chamir Ullah Rocky	Free Agent	Released	22 August 2024	
14	FW	Bishal Das	Free Agent	Released	22 August 2024	
28	MF	Md Shoybur Rahman Mijan	Dhaka Rangers	Free	22 August 2024	
80	MF	(Uzbekistan) Nodir Mavlonov	Chitwan	Free	22 August 2024	
60	DF	(The Gambia) Ousman Touray	Free Agent	Released	22 August 2024	
70	FW	(The Gambia) Yankuba Jallow	Free Agent	Released	22 August 2024	
75	FW	(The Gambia) Mbye Faye	Free Agent	Released	22 August 2024	
40	FW	(The Gambia) Pape Musa Faye	Free Agent	Released	22 August 2024	
36	DF	(The Gambia) Patrick Sylva	Free Agent	Released	22 August 2024	
18	FW	(Ghana) Cheikh Sene	Free Agent	Released	1 March 2025	
20	FW	(Japan) Hiromitsu Shimo	Free Agent	Released	1 March 2025	
17	FW	(The Gambia) Mustapha Drammeh	Free Agent	Released	1 March 2025	
15	FW	(The Gambia) Maxy Cessay	Free Agent	Released	1 March 2025	
44	DF	Rostam Islam Dukhu Mia	Free Agent	Released	1 March 2025	
24	FW	Said Rakib Khan Evan	Chittagong Abahani	Free	1 March 2025	

=== Retained ===
No.	Pos	Player	Date	Source
11	FW	Mahbubur Rahman Sufil	1 June 2024	
21	MF	Hossain Mohammad Arian	1 June 2024	
10	FW	Eleta Kingsley	20 August 2024	
28	DF	Nabil Khandaker Joy	22 August 2024	
9	DF	Md Khalil Bhuiyan	22 August 2024	
30	GK	Md Kamal Hossain Titu	22 August 2024	

== Pre-season and friendlies ==
11 October 2024	Bashundhara Kings	4–0	Brothers Union	Dhaka
17:30 BST (UTC+6)	Fahim; Morsalin; Sarr			Stadium: Bashundhara Kings Arena

24 October 2024	Brothers Union	1–1	Mohamedan	Dhaka
14:30 BST (UTC+6)	Mustapha 17'		Rahim	Stadium: Brothers Union Field

6 November 2024	Brothers Union	0–0	Bangladesh Navy	Dhaka
14:00 BST (UTC+6)				Stadium: Brothers Union Field

== Competitions ==
Win Draw Loss Fixtures

=== Overall ===
Competition	First match	Last match	Final Position
BPL	29 November 2024	27 May 2025	5th
Federation Cup	3 December 2024	8 April 2025	QR to the Final 2

=== Overview ===
Competition	Record							
Competition	Pld	W	D	L	GF	GA	GD	Win %
BPL	18	7	6	5	28	18	+10	38.89
Federation Cup	4	2	1	1	9	1	+8	50.00
Total	22	9	7	6	37	19	+18	40.91

Source: Competitions

=== Premier League ===
==== League table ====
Pos	Team	Pld	W	D	L	GF	GA	GD	Pts	Qualification or relegation
3	Bashundhara Kings (W)	18	9	5	4	45	15	+30	32	Qualification for the AFC Challenge League qualifying stage (Note: as Federation Cup winners.)
4	Rahmatganj	18	9	3	6	39	25	+14	30	
5	Brothers Union	18	7	6	5	28	18	+10	27	
6	Fortis	18	6	9	3	24	15	+9	27	
7	Bangladesh Police	18	8	3	7	23	24	−1	27	

Source: Soccerway
Rules for classification: 1) Points; 2) Goal difference; 3) Goals scored.
(W) Cup Winner

==== Results summary ====
Overall								Home						Away					
Pld	W	D	L	GF	GA	GD	Pts	W	D	L	GF	GA	GD	W	D	L	GF	GA	GD
18	7	6	5	28	18	+10	27	4	3	2	12	4	+8	3	3	3	16	14	+2

Source: Soccerway

==== Results by round ====
Round	1	2	3	4	5	6	7	8	9	10	11	12	13	14	15	16	17	18
Ground	H	A	H	A	A	H	A	H	H	A	H	A	H	H	A	H	A	A
Result	W	D	W	L	D	W	W	L	D	L	L	W	D	D	W	W	D	L
Position	5	4	3	4	4	4	4	5	5	5	7	6	5	5	5	4	4	5

Source: Matches
A = Away; H = Home; W = Win; D = Draw; L = Loss; P = Postponed

=== Matches ===
29 November 2024 1	Brothers Union	2–1	Bangladesh Police	Munshigonj
14:30 BST (UTC+6)	Cessay 23' (yellow card) 64'; Darboe 62'; Nira (yellow card) 78'; Kaushik (yellow card) 83'	Report	Manik Molla (yellow card) 38' (goal) 44'	Stadium: Bir Sreshtho Matiur Rahman Stadium; Referee: Md. Symoon Hasan Sany

7 December 2024 2	Fortis	1–1	Brothers Union	Dhaka
14:30 BST (UTC+6)	Pa Omar 18' (yellow card) 61'; Didarul (yellow card) 40'; Essa (yellow card) 60'	Report	Sene 1' (yellow card) 7'; Nira (yellow card) 60'	Stadium: Bashundhara Kings Arena; Referee: Alomgir Sarker

13 December 2024 3	Brothers Union	2–0	Chittagong Abahani	Munshiganj
14:30 BST (UTC+6)	Sene 14', 90+2'	Report	Russel (yellow card) 10'	Stadium: Munshiganj Stadium; Referee: Bituraj Barua

21 December 2024 4	Rahmatganj	3–1	Brothers Union	Munshiganj
14:30 BST (UTC+6)	Boateng 2', 90+6'; Oshie (yellow card) 73'; Jibon 79'	Report	Sene (yellow card) 30' (goal) 70'; Sazzad (red card) 75'	Stadium: Munshiganj Stadium

27 December 2024 5	Bashundhara Kings	1–1	Brothers Union	Dhaka
17:30 BST (UTC+6)	Jony (yellow card) 57' (goal) 90+7'; Topu (yellow card) 81'; Miguel (yellow card) 90'	Report	Sufil (yellow card) 20'; Sene 39'; Sohel (yellow card) 45+6'; Rahmat (yellow card) 77'	Stadium: Bashundhara Kings Arena; Referee: Anisur Rahman

3 January 2025 6	Brothers Union	3–0	Fakirerpool	Munshiganj
14:30 BST (UTC+6)	Drammeh 10'; Sene 39'; Becaye Diarra (yellow card) 41'; Sazzad 42'; Sushanto (yellow card) 71'	Report		Stadium: Munshiganj Stadium; Referee: Mohammed Jalal Uddin

10 January 2025 7	Dhaka Wanderers	1–4	Brothers Union	Gazipur
14:30 BST (UTC+6)	Sifat 44'; Shawon (yellow card) 78'	Report	Rahmat 18'; Sazzad 25'; Cessay (yellow card) 81'; Kingsley 89'; Sene 90+2'	Stadium: Shaheed Barkat Stadium; Referee: Alomgir Sarker

17 January 2025 8	Brothers Union	0–1	Mohammedan	Munshiganj
14:30 BST (UTC+6)	Sazzad (yellow card) 26'; Sushanto (yellow card) 52'	Report	Sunday 12'; Emmanuel (yellow card) 50'; Muzaffarov (yellow card) 81'	Stadium: Munshiganj Stadium; Referee: Mahmud Zamal Farouqee Nahid

25 January 2025 9	Brothers Union	0–0	Dhaka Abahani	Munshigonj
16:45 BST (UTC+6)	Kaushik (yellow card) 12'; Eleta (yellow card) 35'; Monir (yellow card) 76'	Report	Shahin (yellow card) 54'	Stadium: Bir Sreshtho Matiur Rahman Stadium; Referee: Md. Symoon Hasan Sany

21 February 2025 10	Bangladesh Police	1–0	Brothers Union	Mymensingh
15:00 BST (UTC+6)	Danilo 4'; Anik (red card) 88'	Report	Sushanto (yellow card) 65'; Sazzad (yellow card) 72'	Stadium: Rafiq Uddin Bhuiyan Stadium; Referee: Md Alamgir Sarkar

12 April 2025 11	Brothers Union	0–2	Fortis	Munshigonj
15:30 BST (UTC+6)	Sohel (yellow card) 34'; Monir (yellow card) 45+2'; Mfon (yellow card) 57'	Report	Aky 45'; Pa Omar 60'; Jumaev (yellow card) 70'	Stadium: Shaheed Bir Sreshtho Flight Lieutenant Matiur Rahman Stadium; Referee: Anisur Rahman

26 April 2025 12	Chittagong Abahani	0–2	Brothers Union	Mymensingh
17:30 BST (UTC+6)	Bamba (yellow card) 43'	Report	Darboe 12'; Nira (yellow card) 37'; Mfon 76'	Stadium: Rafiq Uddin Bhuiyan Stadium; Referee: Mahmud Zamal Farouqee Nahid

3 May 2025 13	Brothers Union	0–0	Rahmatganj	Munshigonj
15:45 BST (UTC+6)	Rabbi (yellow card) 26'; Njie (yellow card) 51'; Becaye Diarra (yellow card) 59'	Report		Stadium: Shaheed Bir Sreshtho Flight Lieutenant Matiur Rahman Stadium; Referee: Md Nasir Uddin

9 May 2025 14	Brothers Union	0–0	Bashundhara Kings	Munshiganj
16:00 BST (UTC+6)	Sushanto (yellow card) 21'; Sazzad (yellow card) 77'; Mfon (yellow card) 89'	Report	Yousuf Ali (yellow card) 24'; Sohel Jr. (yellow card) 63'	Stadium: Shaheed Bir Sreshtho Flight Lieutenant Matiur Rahman Stadium; Referee: Sabuj Kumar Das

16 May 2025 15	Fakirerpool	1–4	Brothers Union	Gazipur
16:00 BST (UTC+6)	Ouattara 15'; Fofana (yellow card) 56'	Report	Turaev 30' (pen.) (red card) 57'; Mfon 38' 68'; Becaye Diarra (yellow card) 61'; Sushanto (yellow card) 70'; Kaushik 77'	Stadium: Shaheed Barkat Stadium; Referee: Nasir Uddin

20 May 2025 16	Brothers Union	5–0	Dhaka Wanderers	Munshiganj
16:15 BST (UTC+6)	Njie 8' 86'; Darboe 35' 43'; Becaye Diarra 75'	Report	Henrique (yellow card) 32'	Stadium: Shaheed Bir Sreshtho Flight Lieutenant Matiur Rahman Stadium; Referee: Abul Kalam Rumon

23 May 2025 17	Mohammedan	3–3	Brothers Union	Comilla
17:30 BST (UTC+6)	Mithu 25'; Arif (yellow card) 35'; Diabate 38', 69'	Report	Becaye Diarra 7'; Darboe (yellow card) 18'; Mfon 71'; Jewel 87'	Stadium: Shaheed Dhirendranath Datta Stadium; Referee: Sabuj Das

27 May 2025 18	Dhaka Abahani	3–0	Brothers Union	Comilla
18:00 BST (UTC+6)	Bablu 24' (yellow card) 79'; Raphael 51'; Mirajul 86'	Report	Mfon (yellow card) 79'	Stadium: Shaheed Dhirendranath Datta Stadium; Referee: Anisur Rahman

=== Federation Cup ===
==== Group Stages ====
Pos	Team	Pld	W	D	L	GF	GA	GD	Pts	Qualification
1	Bashundhara Kings	4	3	0	1	9	4	+5	9	Qualified for QRF 1
2	Brothers Union	4	2	1	1	9	1	+8	7	Advanced to QRF 2
3	Fortis	4	2	1	1	5	1	+4	7	
4	Bangladesh Police	4	1	2	1	4	4	0	5	
5	Dhaka Wanderers	4	0	0	4	1	18	−17	0	

Source: Soccerway

3 December 2024 1	Bashundhara Kings	1–0	Brothers Union	Comilla
14:30	Topu 69'	Report		Stadium: Shaheed Dhirendranath Datta Stadium; Referee: Md Golam Mourshed

17 December 2024 2	Brothers Union	8–0	Dhaka Wanderers	Mymensingh
14:30	Rabbi 8'; Drammeh 24', 65', 70'; Sazzad 28', 48', 81'; Eleta 90+3'	Report		Stadium: Rafiq Uddin Bhuiyan Stadium; Referee: Md Nazmul Huda; Man of the Match: Sazzad Hossain

14 January 2025 3	Brothers Union	1–0	Fortis	Mymensingh
14:30	Rabbi 35'	Report		Stadium: Rafiq Uddin Bhuiyan Stadium; Referee: Md Jalal Uddin; Man of the Match: Ashraful Islam Rana

28 January 2025	Bangladesh Police	0–0	Brothers Union	Mymensingh
14:45 BST (UTC+6)		Report		Stadium: Rafiq Uddin Bhuiyan Stadium; Referee: Bhubon Mohon Tarofder

==== Qualification round ====
8 April 2024 2	Brothers Union	1–2	Rahmatganj	Mymensingh
14:45 BST (UTC+6)	Udoh 35'	Report	Boateng 62'; Solomon King 99'	Stadium: Rafiq Uddin Bhuiyan Stadium; Referee: Md Symoon Hasan Sany

== Statistics ==
=== Goalscorers ===
Rank	No.	Pos.	Nat.	Player	BPL	Federation Cup	Total
1	19	(Senegal)	FW	Cheikh Sene	7	0	7
2	9	(Bangladesh)	FW	Sazzad Hossain	2	3	5
2	98	(Nigeria)	FW	Mfon Udoh	4	1	5
4	17	(Senegal)	FW	Mustapha Drammeh	1	3	4
4	18	(The Gambia)	MF	Zakaria Darboe	4	0	4
6	10	(Bangladesh)	FW	Eleta Kingsley	1	1	2
6	27	(Bangladesh)	FW	Kawsar Ali Rabbi	0	2	2
6	90	(The Gambia)	DF	Assan Njie	2	0	2
6	23	(Ghana)	DF	Mouhamed Becaye Diarra	2	0	2
10	3	(Bangladesh)	DF	Rahmat Mia	1	0	1
10	15	(The Gambia)	FW	Maxy Ceesay	1	0	1
10	71	(Uzbekistan)	FW	Akobir Turaev	1	0	1
10	13	(Bangladesh)	MF	Kaushik Barua	1	0	1
10	99	(Bangladesh)	FW	Jewel Rana	1	0	1
Total					28	10	38

Source: Matches
