= 2023–24 Mohammedan SC (Dhaka) season =

Mohammedan SC
2023–24 season
- President: Md Abdul Mubeen
- Head coach: Alfaz Ahmed
- Stadium: Rafiq Uddin Bhuiyan Stadium
- Bangladesh Premier League: 2nd
- Federation Cup: Runners-up
- Independence Cup: Runners-up
- Top goalscorer: League: Souleymane Diabate (17 goals); All: Souleymane Diabate (17 goals)
- Biggest win: 8–0 v Brothers Union (Home); 20 April 2024 (Premier League)
- Biggest defeat: 1–2 v Bashundhara Kings (Neutral); 18 December 2023 (Independence Cup) 1–2 v Bashundhara Kings (Home); 10 May 2024 (Premier League) 1–2 v Bashundhara Kings (Neutral); 22 May 2024 (Federation Cup)

The 2023–24 season was Mohammedan SC Dhaka's 88th season in existence and 16th consecutive season in Bangladesh Premier League since the league's establishment in 2007. In addition to domestic league, Mohammedan are participating in this season's edition of the Federation Cup and Independence Cup. The season covered the period from 1 August 2023 to 31 May 2024.

== Management ==
Position	Staff
Board of directors
President	(Bangladesh) Md Abdul Mubeen
Director in charge	(Bangladesh) Kazi Firoz Rashid
Chairman	(Bangladesh) Ghulam Mohammed Alamgir
Technical Committee
Head	(Bangladesh) Imtiaz Sultan Johnny
Member	(Bangladesh) Hasanuzzaman Khan Bablu
Member	(Bangladesh) Rumman Bin Wali Sabbir
Member	(Bangladesh) Elias Hossain
Member	(Bangladesh) Jasimuddin Joshi
Member	(Bangladesh) Fazlur Rahman Babul
Coaching Staff
Head Coach	(Bangladesh) Alfaz Ahmed
Assistant Coach	(Bangladesh) Abdul Kayum Sentu
Goalkeeper Coach	(Bangladesh) Sayeed Hassan Kanan
Fitness Trainer	(Bosnia and Herzegovina) Sandi Sahman
Physiotherapist	(Bangladesh) Md Nurul Islam
Team Manager	(Bangladesh) Imtiaz Ahmed Nakib
Assistant manager	(Bangladesh) Sayed Mohammad Abdul Kabbar Siddique

== Players ==
As of 24 March 2024

No.	Player	Nat.	Position(s)	Date of birth	Year signed	Previous club
Goalkeepers
1	Sujon Hossain	(Bangladesh)	GK	5 August 1996 (aged 27)	2019	Sheikh Jamal Dhanmondi
22	Shakib Al Hasan	(Bangladesh)	GK	11 November 2004 (aged 18)	2020	Youth System
30	Md Alamgir Hossen	(Bangladesh)	GK		2023	Bangladesh Army
40	Maksudur Rahman Mostak	(Bangladesh)	GK	19 October 1990 (aged 33)	2022	Muktijoddha Sangsad
Defenders
2	Sazal Hasan Kalin	(Bangladesh)	RB	5 July 1995 (aged 28)	2022	Swadhinata KS
3	Kamrul Islam	(Bangladesh)	LB	25 December 1998 (aged 24)	2023	Chittagong Abahani Limited
4	Mehedi Hasan Mithu	(Bangladesh)	CB	24 October 1994 (aged 29)	2022	Bashundhara Kings
5	Emmanuel Tony	(Nigeria)	CB	21 November 1992 (aged 30)	2023	(Nigeria) Lobi Stars
25	Sadekujaman Fahim	(Bangladesh)	RB	9 December 2002 (aged 20)	2019	NoFeL SC
26	Hasan Murad Tipu	(Bangladesh)	RB/CB	1 February 1998 (aged 25)	2022	Swadhinata KS
28	Hafizur Rahman Babu	(Bangladesh)	RB	1 January 1998 (aged 25)	2023	Wari Club
29	Shakil Ahad Topu	(Bangladesh)	CB/DM	6 April 2006 (aged 17)	2022	Uttara FC
31	Mahbub Alam	(Bangladesh)	RB/LB	22 June 1996 (aged 27)	2023	Bangladesh Army
32	Kazi Rahad Mia	(Bangladesh)	RB/CB	15 July 2003 (aged 20)	2023	Chittagong Abahani Limited
35	Jahid Hasan Shanto	(Bangladesh)	RB/CB	1 January 2003 (aged 20)	2022	Fakirerpool Young Men's Club
Midfielders
6	Dosso Sidik	(Ivory Coast)	DM		2023	
7	Minhajul Abedin Ballu	(Bangladesh)	DM	16 September 2001 (aged 22)	2021	Muktijoddha Sangsad
8	Sanowar Hossain Lal	(Bangladesh)	AM/LM	1 April 2003 (aged 20)	2022	Rahmatganj MFS
14	Manik Hossain Molla	(Bangladesh)	DM	11 March 1999 (aged 24)	2022	Sheikh Russel KC
15	Alamgir Kabir Rana	(Bangladesh)	CM/AM	7 June 1990 (aged 33)	2022	Bashundhara Kings
16	Md Jewel	(Bangladesh)	DM	10 February 1995 (aged 28)	2023	Sheikh Russel KC
17	Muzaffar Muzaffarov	(Uzbekistan)	CM	12 April 1995 (aged 28)	2022	(Uzbekistan) FC Dinamo Samarqand
20	Moinul Islam Moin	(Bangladesh)	CM/AM	18 February 2005 (aged 18)	2022	Uttara FC
21	Omar Faruk Babu	(Bangladesh)	CM/DM	5 August 1994 (aged 29)	2023	Sheikh Jamal Dhanmondi
23	Rakibul Islam	(Bangladesh)	CM	20 February 2003 (aged 20)	2023	Victoria SC
24	Ashraful Haque Asif	(Bangladesh)	CM	5 June 2005 (aged 18)	2020	Youth System
27	Mishu Mia	(Bangladesh)	CM	10 December 2000 (aged 22)	2023	Uttara FC
36	Bekhruz Sadilloev	(Uzbekistan)	AM	26 January 1996 (aged 27)	2024	(Uzbekistan) FK Mash'al Mubarek
Forwards
9	Shahriar Emon	(Bangladesh)	RW	7 March 2001 (aged 22)	2021	Bangladesh Army
10	Souleymane Diabate	(Mali)	CF	23 March 1991 (aged 32)	2019	(Vietnam) Long An FC
11	Jafar Iqbal	(Bangladesh)	RW/LW	27 September 1999 (aged 24)	2020	Saif Sporting Club
12	Arif Hossain	(Bangladesh)	LW	31 December 2001 (aged 21)	2022	Uttar Baridhara Club
18	Sourav Dewan	(Bangladesh)	CF	15 June 1998 (aged 25)	2023	Dhaka Wanderers Club
37	Sunday Emmanuel	(Nigeria)	FW	25 February 1992 (aged 31)	2023	(Jordan) Al-Jalil SC
38	Raju Ahmed Zisan	(Bangladesh)	RW	10 February 2005 (aged 18)	2023	Gopalganj SC
Left during the season
19	Uryu Nagata	(Japan)	DM	4 January 1994 (aged 29)	2023	(Australia) Rochedale Rovers FC

== Transfer ==
=== In ===
No.	Pos	Player	Previous club	Fee	Date	Source
28	DF	Hafizur Rahman Babu	Wari Club	Free	1 August 2023	
16	MF	Md Jewel	Sheikh Russel KC	Free	1 August 2023	
19	MF	(Japan) Uryu Nagata	(Australia) Rochedale Rovers FC	Free	25 August 2023	
5	DF	(Nigeria) Emmanuel Tony	(Nigeria) Lobi Stars	Free	25 August 2023	
31	DF	Kazi Rahad Mia	Chittagong Abahani Limited	Free	1 September 2023	
21	MF	Omar Faruk Babu	Sheikh Jamal Dhanmondi Club	Free	13 September 2023	
29	MF	Md Shakil Ahad Topu	Uttara FC	Free	1 October 2023	
27	MF	Md Mishu Mia	Uttara FC	Free	1 October 2023	
38	MF	Raju Ahmed Zisan	Gopalganj SC	Free	1 October 2023	
23	DF	Md Rakibul Islam	Victoria SC	Free	1 October 2023	
30	GK	Md Alamgir Hossen	Bangladesh Army	Free	1 October 2023	
32	DF	Mahbub Alam	Bangladesh Army	Free	1 October 2023	
6	MF	(Ivory Coast) Dossi Sidik	Unattached	Free	1 October 2023	
36	MF	(Uzbekistan) Bekhruz Sadilloev	Unattached	Free	1 March 2024	

=== Out ===
No.	Pos	Player	Moved to	Fee	Date	Source
28	DF	Mohammed Jahid Hasan	Bashundhara Kings	Free	July 2023	
19	DF	Abid Hossain	Unattached	Released	July 2023	
3	DF	Rajib Hossain	Sheikh Jamal Dhanmondi Club	Pre-contract	August 2023	
1	GK	Ahsan Habib Bipu	Bangladesh Police FC	Free	August 2023	
5	DF	(Brazil) Roger Duarte	Unattached	Released	October 2023	
9	FW	Amir Hakim Bappy	Fortis FC	Free	August 2023	
31	FW	Miraz Molla	Bangladesh Police FC	Free	October 2023	
39	FW	Mahbubur Rahman Sufil	Brothers Union	Free	October 2023	
23	DF	Nayan Mia	Unattached	Released	October 2023	
19	MF	(Japan) Uryu Nagata	Unattached	Released	March 2024	

== Competitions ==
Win Draw Loss Fixtures

=== Overall ===
Competition	First match	Last match	Final Position
BPL	23 December 2023	29 May 2024	Runners-up
Federation Cup	25 December 2023	22 May 2024	Runners-up
Independence Cup	27 October 2023	18 December 2023	Runners-up

=== Overview ===
Competition	Record							
Competition	Pld	W	D	L	GF	GA	GD	Win %
BPL	18	9	8	1	40	17	+23	50.00
Federation Cup	6	5	0	1	11	7	+4	83.33
Independence Cup	5	2	2	1	6	5	+1	40.00
Total	29	16	10	3	57	29	+28	55.17

Source: Soccerway

=== Premier League ===
==== League table ====
Pos	Team	Pld	W	D	L	GF	GA	GD	Pts	Qualification or relegation
1	Bashundhara Kings (C, W, Q)	18	14	3	1	49	13	+36	45	Qualification for the AFC Challenge League group stage and 2024 Bangladesh Challenge Cup
2	Mohammedan SC (Q)	18	9	8	1	40	17	+23	35	Qualification for the 2024 Bangladesh Challenge Cup (Note: being Bashundhara Kings Champions and winners of both league and 2023–24 Federation Cup, Mohammedan SC qualified for 2024 Bangladesh Challenge Cup after being runners-up in both league and cup.)
3	Abahani Ltd. Dhaka	18	9	5	4	34	22	+12	32	
4	Bangladesh Police FC	18	7	5	6	23	19	+4	26	
5	Fortis FC	18	6	6	6	21	23	−2	24	

Source: Soccerway
Rules for classification: 1) Points; 2) Goal difference; 3) Goals scored.
(C) Champion; (Q) Qualify for the phase indicated; (W) Cup Winner

==== Results by round ====
Round	1	2	3	4	5	6	7	8	9	10	11	12	13	14	15	16	17	18
Ground	A	H	A	A	H	A	A	H	H	H	A	H	H	A	H	H	A	A
Result	W	D	W	W	D	W	D	D	D	W	W	W	D	D	L	D	W	W
Position	3	2	2	2	2	2	2	2	2	2	2	2	2	2	2	2	2	2

Source: Matches
A = Away; H = Home; W = Win; D = Draw; L = Loss; P = Postponed

==== Results summary ====
Overall								Home						Away					
Pld	W	D	L	GF	GA	GD	Pts	W	D	L	GF	GA	GD	W	D	L	GF	GA	GD
18	9	8	1	40	17	+23	35	2	6	1	19	8	+11	7	2	0	21	9	+12

Source: Soccerway

=== Matches ===
22 December 2023 1	Fortis FC	1–2	Mohammedan SC	Rajshahi
14:30 BST (UTC+6)	Jumaev (yellow card) 15'; Sarr 43'	Report	Emon 13'; Muzaffarov (yellow card) 29'; Emmanuel 90'	Stadium: Muktijuddho Sriti Stadium; Referee: Sabuj Kumar Das

29 December 2023 2	Mohammedan SC	1–1	Sheikh Russel KC	Mymensingh
14:30 BST (UTC+6)	Diabate 9' (yellow card) 56'; Molla (yellow card) 62'	Report	Jintu (yellow card) 60'; Ndikumana 64'	Stadium: Rafiq Uddin Bhuiyan Stadium; Referee: MZF Nahid

12 January 2024 3	Brothers Union	1–5	Mohammedan SC	Rajshahi
14:45 BST (UTC+6)	Shoybur (yellow card) 14'; Otabek (yellow card) 22'; Noyon 78'	Report	Minhajul (yellow card) 10'; Diabate 28' (pen.), 68'; Jafar (yellow card) 45+5'; Muzaffarov 49'; Sunday 60', 66'; Kamrul (yellow card) 90'	Stadium: Muktijuddho Sriti Stadium; Referee: Jasim Akhter

20 January 2024 4	Bangladesh Police	2–3	Mohammedan SC	Mymensingh
14:45 BST (UTC+6)	Palacio 34'; Morillo (yellow card) 45+3'; Sahed 84'	Report	Asif (yellow card) 3'; Jafar 27'; Muzaffarov 70'; Diabate 78'	Stadium: Rafiq Uddin Bhuiyan Stadium; Referee: Md Alamgir Sarker

26 January 2024 5	Mohammedan SC	0–0	Chittagong Abahani	Mymensingh
14:45 BST (UTC+6)	Sanowar (yellow card) 6' (yellow-red card) 20'; Mithu (yellow card) 90+5'	Report	Ifegwu (yellow card) 73'	Stadium: Rafiq Uddin Bhuiyan Stadium; Referee: Alomgir Sarker

3 February 2024 6	Bashundhara Kings	0–1	Mohammedan SC	Dhaka
17:15 BST (UTC+6)	Dori (yellow card) 73'	Report	Minhajul 40'; Diabate (yellow card) 81'; Topu (yellow card) 90+10'	Stadium: Bashundhara Kings Arena; Referee: Anisur Rahman

9 February 2024 7	Rahmatganj MFS	1–1	Mohammedan SC	Munshigonj
15:00 BST (UTC+6)	Ceesay 27' (yellow card) 84'; Arafat (yellow card) 30'; Al Amin (yellow card) 84'; Nayeem (yellow card) 90+9'	Report	Muzaffarov 86' (pen.)	Stadium: Shaheed Bir Sreshtho Flight Lieutenant Matiur Rahman Stadium; Referee: Md Saymoon Hasan Sany

17 February 2024 8	Mohammedan SC	0–0	Sheikh Jamal DC	Mymensingh
15:00 BST (UTC+6)	Sunday (yellow card) 45+2'	Report	Kaushik (yellow card) 39'; Jayed (yellow card) 45'; Rajib (yellow card) 83'; Pritom (yellow card) 90+3'	Stadium: Rafiq Uddin Bhuiyan Stadium; Referee: Symoon Hasan Sanny

24 February 2024 9	Mohammedan SC	2–2	Dhaka Abahani	Mymensingh
15:00 BST (UTC+6)	Emmanuel (yellow card) 6'; Manik (yellow card) 78'; Diabate 68' (pen.), 87' (pen.)	Report	Bruninho 2'; Rafi (yellow card) 48'; Cornelius 55'; Ridoy (yellow card) 66'	Stadium: Rafiq Uddin Bhuiyan Stadium; Referee: Symoon Hasan Sany

29 March 2024 10	Mohammedan SC	4–0	Fortis FC	Mymensingh
15:15 BST (UTC+6)	Muzaffarov 41'; Diabate (pen.), 45+1'; Iqbal 52'; Emon 59'	Report		Stadium: Rafiq Uddin Bhuiyan Stadium; Referee: Md Alamgir Sarker

6 April 2024 11	Sheikh Russel KC	1–3	Mohammedan SC	Dhaka
15:15 BST (UTC+6)	Balabanovic (pen.), 45+7' (yellow card) 69'; Sagor (yellow card) 72'; Sylla (red card) 90'; Shahin (yellow card) 90+5'	Report	Diabate 37' (pen.); Muzaffarov 72'; Iqbal 77'; Mithu (yellow card) 90'	Stadium: Bashundhara Kings Arena; Referee: Md Alamgir Sarker

20 April 2024 12	Mohammedan SC	8–0	Brothers Union	Mymensingh
15:45 BST (UTC+6)	Sunday (yellow card) 19'; Emon 34'; Diabate 43', 45+2', 68', 72', 89'; Jewel 75'; Emmanuel 87'	Report	Saiful (yellow card) 13'	Stadium: Rafiq Uddin Bhuiyan Stadium; Referee: Md Jalal Uddin

27 April 2024 13	Mohammedan SC	0–0	Bangladesh Police	Mymensingh
15:45 BST (UTC+6)	Manik (yellow card) 42'; Diabate (yellow card) 87'; Murad (yellow card) 90+4'	Report		Stadium: Rafiq Uddin Bhuiyan Stadium; Referee: Bituraj Barua

3 May 2024 14	Chittagong Abahani	1–1	Mohammedan SC	Munshigonj
16:00 BST (UTC+6)	Ifegwu 34', (yellow card) 63'; Rana (yellow card) 76'	Report	Arif 27'; Emmanuel (yellow card) 32'	Stadium: Bir Sreshtho Fl. Lt. Matiur Rahman Stadium; Referee: Saymoon Sunny

10 May 2024 15	Mohammedan SC	1–2	Bashundhara Kings	Mymensingh
16:00 BST (UTC+6)	Diabate (yellow card) 14'; Muzaffarov (yellow card) 33'; Molla (yellow card) 45'; Minhajul 65'; Emmanuel (yellow card) 81'	Report	Dorielton 19', 52'; Sohel (yellow card) 63'; Topu (yellow card) 68'; Rakib (yellow card) 77'; Saad (yellow card) 90+6'	Stadium: Rafiq Uddin Bhuiyan Stadium; Referee: Saymoon Hasan Sany

17 May 2024 16	Mohammedan SC	3–3	Rahmatganj MFS	Mymensingh
16:00 BST (UTC+6)	Jafar 5'; Diabate 21', 97' (yellow card) 84'; Emon (yellow card) 70'	Report	Ikhtiyor (yellow card) 10'; Boateng 34'; Konney 41' (pen.), 65'; Sushanto (yellow card) 85'	Stadium: Rafiq Uddin Bhuiyan Stadium; Referee: Bituraj Barua

25 May 2024 17	Sheikh Jamal DC	1–3	Mohammedan SC	Gopalganj
16:00 BST (UTC+6)	Kholmatov 90+4' (pen.); Shaymanov (yellow card) 81'	Report	Diabate 36', 90'; Sunday 53'; Kalin (yellow card) 90+2'	Stadium: Sheikh Fazlul Haque Mani Stadium; Referee: Md Jalal Uddin

29 May 2024 18	Dhaka Abahani	1–2	Mohammedan SC	Gopalganj
16:00 BST (UTC+6)	Bruninho 13'; Milad Sheykh (yellow card) 34'; Ridoy (yellow card) 45+4'; Evans (yellow card) 90'	Report	Arif 29', 90' (yellow card) 59'; Sunday (yellow card) 82'	Stadium: Sheikh Fazlul Haque Mani Stadium; Referee: Symoon Hasan Sanny

=== Independence Cup ===
Pos	Team	Pld	W	D	L	GF	GA	GD	Pts	Qualification
1	Mohammedan SC	2	0	2	0	3	3	0	2	Advance to Knockout stage
2	Bangladesh Army	2	0	2	0	2	2	0	2	Advance to Knockout stage
3	Fortis FC	2	0	2	0	1	1	0	2	

Source: GSA
Rules for classification: Group stage tiebreakers

28 October 2023	Mohammedan SC	2–2	Bangladesh Army	Dhaka
14:30 BST (UTC+6)	Arif 20'; Jafar 67'	Report	Emtiyaz 9'; Ranju 24'; Mahbub (yellow card) 72'	Stadium: Bashundhara Kings Arena; Referee: Bituraj Barua

4 November 2023	Fortis FC	1–1	Mohammedan SC	Munshiganj
14:30 BST (UTC+6)	Gryshyn 30'; Farhad (yellow card) 75'	Report	Arif (yellow card) 45+2'; Minhajul 74'	Stadium: Shaheed Bir Sreshtho Flight Lieutenant Matiur Rahman Stadium; Referee: Bhubon Mohon Torafder

==== Knockout stages ====
4 December 2023 Quarter-finals	Chittagong Abahani	0–1	Mohammedan SC	Munshiganj
13:45 BST (UTC+6)	Remon (yellow card) 91'; Azeez (yellow card) 94'; Sakib (yellow card) 79' (yellow-red card) 115'	Report	Manik (yellow card) 83'; Muzaffarov 97', (yellow card) 103'; Tony (yellow card) 111'; Diabate (yellow card) 120+5'	Stadium: Shaheed Bir Sreshtho Flight Lieutenant Matiur Rahman Stadium; Referee: Jashim Akhter

15 December 2023 Semi-finals	Rahmatganj MFS	0–1	Mohammedan SC	Gopalganj
13:45 BST (UTC+6)	Tashpulatov (yellow card) 70'	Report	Shanto (yellow card) 62'; Muzaffarov 72'	Stadium: Sheikh Fazlul Haque Mani Stadium; Referee: Bituraj Barua

===== Final =====
18 December 2023 Final	Mohammedan SC	1–2	Bashundhara Kings	Gopalganj
13:45 BST (UTC+6)	Sunday 51' (yellow card) 90+5'; Babu (yellow card) 64'; Fahim (yellow card) 89'; Muzaffarov (yellow card) 90+3'	Report	Rafiqul (red card) 48'; Rakib 52'; Figueira (yellow card) 64'; Dorielton 86'; Robinho (yellow card) 90+3'; Sohel (yellow card) 90+5'	Stadium: Sheikh Fazlul Haque Mani Stadium; Referee: Md Jalal Uddin

=== Federation Cup ===
Pos	Team	Pld	W	D	L	GF	GA	GD	Pts	Qualification
1	Mohammedan SC	3	3	0	0	6	3	+3	9	Advance to Knockout stage
2	Abahani Limited Dhaka	3	2	0	1	10	2	+8	6	Advance to Knockout stage
3	Chittagong Abahani	3	1	0	2	4	5	−1	3	
4	Brothers Union	3	0	0	3	1	11	−10	0	

Source: Soccerway
Rules for classification: Group stages tiebreakers

16 January 2024 1	Mohammedan SC	2–1	Chittagong Abahani	Gopalganj
14:45 BST (UTC+6)	Jafar (yellow card) 29', (goal) 45+3'; Muzaffarov 55'; Minhajul (yellow card) 87'; Sujon (yellow card) 90+2'	Report	Azeez 14'; Saymon (yellow card) 22'	Stadium: Sheikh Fazlul Haque Mani Stadium; Referee: Saymoon Hasan Sany

30 January 2024 2	Mohammedan SC	2–1	Brothers Union	Gopalganj
14:45 BST (UTC+6)	Diabate (yellow card) 57'; Sourav 66'; Jafar 85'	Report	Otabek (yellow card) 33' (goal) 69'	Stadium: Sheikh Fazlul Haque Mani Stadium; Referee: Md Anisur Rahman Sagor

13 February 2024 3	Dhaka Abahani	1–2	Mohammedan SC	Gopalganj
15:00 BST (UTC+6)	Stewart 38'; Mridha (yellow card) 75'	Report	Emmanuel 51', 55'	Stadium: Sheikh Fazlul Haque Mani Stadium; Referee: Bituraj Barua

==== Knockout stages ====
2 April 2024 Quarter-final	Mohammedan SC	2–1	Sheikh Russel KC	Gopalganj
15:00 BST (UTC+6)	Muzaffarov 71'; Jafar 90+1'	Report	Sylla 1'	Stadium: Sheikh Fazlul Haque Mani Stadium; Referee: Bituraj Barua

7 May 2024 Semi-final	Mohammedan SC	2–1	Bangladesh Police	Munshiganj
15:00 BST (UTC+6)	Sunday 68'; Emon 79'; Minhajul (yellow card) 88'; Muzaffarov (yellow card) 90+6'	Report	Uktamov 47'	Stadium: Shaheed Bir Sreshtho Flight Lieutenant Matiur Rahman Stadium; Referee: Saymoon Hasan Sany

===== Final =====
22 May 2024 Final	Mohammedan SC	1–2 (a.e.t.)	Bashundhara Kings	Mymensingh
15:00 BST (UTC+6)	Sunday 63'; Mahbub (yellow card) 66'; Murad (yellow card) 108'; Diabate (yellow card) 116'	Report	Bishwanath (yellow card) 17'; Topu (yellow card) 73'; Figueira 87'; Jahid 105'; Sohel (yellow card) 121'	Stadium: Rafiq Uddin Bhuiyan Stadium; Attendance: 10,000; Referee: Jasim Akhter

== Statistics ==
=== Squad statistics ===
No.	Pos	Nat	Player	Total		BPL		Federation Cup		Independence Cup	
No.	Pos	Nat	Player	Apps	Goals	Apps	Goals	Apps	Goals	Apps	Goals
1	GK	(Bangladesh)	Sujon Hossain	24	0	16	0	4	0	4	0
22	GK	(Bangladesh)	Shakib Al Hasan	7	0	2+2	0	2	0	1	0
30	GK	(Bangladesh)	Md Alamgir Hossen	1	0	0+1	0	0	0	0	0
40	GK	(Bangladesh)	Maksudur Rahman Mostak	0	0	0	0	0	0	0	0
2	DF	(Bangladesh)	Sazal Hasan Kalin	8	0	0+1	0	2	0	4+1	0
3	DF	(Bangladesh)	Kamrul Islam	22	0	15	0	2	0	5	0
4	DF	(Bangladesh)	Mehedi Hasan Mithu	22	0	17	0	4+1	0	0	0
5	DF	(Nigeria)	Emmanuel Tony	29	2	18	2	6	0	5	0
25	DF	(Bangladesh)	Sadekujaman Fahim	4	0	0	0	0	0	1+3	0
26	DF	(Bangladesh)	Hasan Murad Tipu	21	0	17	0	4	0	0	0
28	DF	(Bangladesh)	Hafizur Rahman Babu	0	0	0	0	0	0	0	0
29	DF	(Bangladesh)	Shakil Ahad Topu	8	0	0+4	0	0+2	0	1+1	0
31	DF	(Bangladesh)	Mahbub Alam	16	0	6+5	0	4+1	0	0	0
32	DF	(Bangladesh)	Kazi Rahad Mia	2	0	0+1	0	0+1	0	0	0
35	DF	(Bangladesh)	Jahid Hasan Shanto	11	0	1+1	0	3+1	0	5	0
6	MF	(Ivory Coast)	Dosso Sidik	3	0	1	0	2	0	0	0
7	MF	(Bangladesh)	Minhajul Abedin Ballu	25	3	11+5	2	3+2	0	2+2	1
8	MF	(Bangladesh)	Sanowar Hossain Lal	4	0	2+1	0	0	0	1	0
14	MF	(Bangladesh)	Manik Hossain Molla	16	0	7+4	0	0+2	0	2+1	0
15	MF	(Bangladesh)	Alamgir Kabir Rana	3	0	0+1	0	1	0	0+1	0
16	MF	(Bangladesh)	Md Jewel	9	1	2+5	1	1+1	0	0	0
17	MF	(Uzbekistan)	Muzaffar Muzaffarov	29	9	18	5	6	2	5	2
20	MF	(Bangladesh)	Moinul Islam Moin	4	0	0+1	0	2	0	0+1	0
21	MF	(Bangladesh)	Omar Faruk Babu	5	0	1+2	0	0	0	2	0
23	MF	(Bangladesh)	Rakibul Islam	1	0	0	0	1	0	0	0
24	MF	(Bangladesh)	Ashraful Haque Asif	2	0	1	0	1	0	0	0
27	MF	(Bangladesh)	Mishu Mia	0	0	0	0	0	0	0	0
38	MF	(Bangladesh)	Raju Ahmed Zisan	1	0	0	0	1	0	0	0
9	FW	(Bangladesh)	Shahriar Emon	22	4	11+6	3	3+2	1	0	0
10	FW	(Mali)	Souleymane Diabate	26	17	17	17	4	0	5	0
11	FW	(Bangladesh)	Jafar Iqbal	23	7	4+11	4	1+2	2	2+3	1
12	FW	(Bangladesh)	Arif Hossain	27	4	12+5	3	4+1	0	5	1
18	FW	(Bangladesh)	Sourav Dewan	7	1	1+5	0	0+1	1	0	0
36	MF	(Uzbekistan)	Bekhruz Sadilloev	1	0	1	0	0	0	0	0
37	FW	(Nigeria)	Sunday Emmanuel	27	8	17	3	5	4	5	1
Players who left during the season
19	MF	(Japan)	Uryu Nagata	0	0	0	0	0	0	0	0

Source: Soccerway

Independence Cup: Md Alamgir Hossen, Mahbub Alam, Mehedi Hasan Mithu, Hasan Murad Tipu and Shahriar Emon represented their services team, the Bangladesh Army, in the Independence Cup.

=== Goalscorers ===
Rank	No.	Pos.	Nat.	Player	BPL	Federation Cup	Independence Cup	Total
1	10	FW	(Mali)	Souleymane Diabate	17	0	0	17
2	17	MF	(Uzbekistan)	Muzaffar Muzaffarov	5	2	2	9
3	11	FW	(Bangladesh)	Jafar Iqbal	4	3	1	8
3	37	FW	(Nigeria)	Sunday Emmanuel	3	4	1	8
5	9	FW	(Bangladesh)	Shahriar Emon	3	1	0	4
5	12	FW	(Bangladesh)	Arif Hossain	3	0	1	4
7	7	MF	(Bangladesh)	Minhajul Abedin Ballu	2	0	1	3
8	5	DF	(Nigeria)	Emmanuel Tony	2	0	0	2
9	18	FW	(Bangladesh)	Sourav Dewan	0	1	0	1
9	16	MF	(Bangladesh)	Md Jewel	1	0	0	1
Total					40	11	6	57

Source: Matches

=== Assists ===
Rank	No.	Pos.	Nat.	Player	BPL	Federation Cup	Independence Cup	Total
1	10	FW	(Mali)	Souleymane Diabate	6	3	1	10
2	17	MF	(Uzbekistan)	Muzaffar Muzaffarov	5	1	2	8
3	37	FW	(Nigeria)	Sunday Emmanuel	4	1	0	5
4	9	FW	(Bangladesh)	Shahriar Emon	3	1	0	4
4	12	FW	(Bangladesh)	Arif Hossain	3	1	0	4
6	11	FW	(Bangladesh)	Jafar Iqbal	2	0	0	2
6	16	MF	(Bangladesh)	Md Jewel	2	0	0	2
8	4	DF	(Bangladesh)	Mehedi Hasan Mithu	1	0	0	1
8	14	MF	(Bangladesh)	Manik Hossain Molla	1	0	0	1
8	6	MF	(Ivory Coast)	Dosso Sidik	0	1	0	1
8	31	DF	(Bangladesh)	Mahbub Alam	1	0	0	1
8	7	MF	(Bangladesh)	Minhajul Abedin Ballu	1	0	0	1
Total					29	8	3	40

Source: Soccerway
