= 2022–23 Mohammedan SC (Dhaka) season =

Mohammedan SC
2022–23 season
- President: Md Abdul Mubeen
- Head coach: Shafiqul Islam Manik
- Stadium: Shaheed Dhirendranath Datta Stadium
- Bangladesh Premier League: 4th of 11
- Federation Cup: Champion
- Independence Cup: Quarter-finals
- Top goalscorer: League: Souleymane Diabate (16); All: Souleymane Diabate (26)
- Biggest win: 7–0 Vs AFC Uttara (10 January 2023)
- Biggest defeat: 0–3 Vs Sheikh Russel KC (21 November 2022)

The 2022–23 season was the Mohammedan SC Dhaka's 87th season in existence and 15th consecutive season in Bangladesh Premier League since the league's establishment in 2007. In addition to domestic league, Dhaka Mohammedan SC are participated on this season's edition of Federation Cup and Independence Cup. This season covered period was 8 October 2022 to 22 July 2023.

== Current squad ==
Mohammedan SC squad for 2022–23 season.

As of May 2022

Note: Flags indicate national team as defined under FIFA eligibility rules; some limited exceptions apply. Players may hold more than one non-FIFA nationality.

No.	Pos.	Nation	Player
1	GK	BAN	Ahsan Habib Bipu
2	DF	BAN	Sazal Hasan Kalin
3	DF	BAN	Rajib Hossain
4	DF	BAN	Mehedi Hasan Mithu
5	DF	BRA	Roger Duarte
7	FW	VEN	Daniel Febles
9	FW	BAN	Amir Hakim Bappy
10	FW	MLI	Souleymane Diabate (Captain)
11	FW	BAN	Jafar Iqbal
12	MF	BAN	Sazzad Hossain
14	MF	BAN	Manik Hossain Molla
15	MF	BAN	Alamgir Kabir Rana
16	FW	BAN	Arif Hossain
17	MF	UZB	Muzaffar Muzaffarov
18	MF	BAN	Shahriar Emon

No.	Pos.	Nation	Player
19	DF	BAN	Abid Hossain
20	MF	BAN	Moinul Islam Moin
21	MF	BAN	Sanowar Hossain Lal
22	GK	BAN	Shakib Al Hasan
23	DF	BAN	Nayan Mia
24	MF	BAN	Ashraful Haque Asif
25	DF	BAN	Sadekujaman Fahim
26	DF	BAN	Hasan Murad Tipu
27	MF	BAN	Minhajul Abedin Ballu
28	DF	BAN	Jahid Hasan
30	GK	BAN	Sujon Hossain
31	MF	BAN	Miraz Molla
35	DF	BAN	Jahid Hasan Shanto
36	DF	BAN	Kamrul Islam
37	FW	NGR	Sunday Emmanuel
39	FW	BAN	Mahbubur Rahman Sufil
40	GK	BAN	Maksudur Rahman Mostak

== Transfers ==
=== In ===
No.	Pos	Player	Previous club	Fee	Date	Source
	MF	(Bangladesh) Sanowar Hossain Lal	(Bangladesh) Rahmatganj MFS	Free transfer	9 August 2022	
	DF	(Bangladesh) Rahmat Mia	(Bangladesh) Dhaka Mohammedan	Free transfer	14 August 2022	
	MF	(Bangladesh) Manik Hossain Molla	(Bangladesh) Sheikh Russel KC	Free transfer	15 August 2022	
	MF	(Bangladesh) Alamgir Kabir Rana	(Bangladesh) Bashundhara Kings	Free transfer	23 August 2022	
	FW	(Bangladesh) Sazzad Hossain	(Bangladesh) Saif Sporting Club	Free transfer	10 October 2022	
	MF	(Uzbekistan) Muzaffar Muzaffarov	(Uzbekistan) FC Dinamo Samarqand	Free transfer	11 October 2022	
	MF	(Bangladesh) Nazmul Hossain Akondo	(Bangladesh) Dhaka Wanderers Club	Free transfer	12 October 2022	
	MF	(Iran) Meysam Shahmakvandzadeh	(Iran) Shams Azar F.C.	Free transfer	12 October 2022	
	DF	(Brazil) Roger Duarte	(Brazil) Operário-MT	Free transfer	12 October 2022	
	FW	(Bangladesh) Arif Hossain	(Bangladesh) Uttar Baridhara Club	Free transfer	13 October 2022	
	DF	(Bangladesh) Jahid Hasan Shanto	(Bangladesh) Fakirerpool YMC	Free transfer	15 October 2022	
	DF	(Bangladesh) Mohammed Jahid Hasan	(Bangladesh) Arambagh KS	Free transfer	15 October 2022	
	MF	(Bangladesh) Moinul Islam Moin	(Bangladesh) Uttara FC	Free transfer	15 October 2022	
	FW	(Bangladesh) Mahbubur Rahman Sufil	(Bangladesh) Bashundhara Kings	Free transfer	24 October 2022	
	DF	(Bangladesh) Mehedi Hasan Mithu	(Bangladesh) Bashundhara Kings	Free transfer	1 November 2022	
	FW	(Bangladesh) Miraz Molla	(Bangladesh) Arambagh KS	Free transfer	2 November 2022	
–	FW	(Nigeria) Sunday Chukwuemeka Emmanuel	(Jordan) Al-Jalil SC	Free transfer	16 March 2023	

=== Out ===
No.	Pos	Player	Moved to	Fee	Date	Source
5	DF	(North Macedonia) Jasmin Mecinovikj	(North Macedonia) FK Skopje	Free transfer	15 August 2022	
14	MF	(Australia) Aaron Reardon	Unattached	Released	15 August 2022	
39	MF	(Bangladesh) Shekh Morsalin	(Bangladesh) Bashundhara Kings	End of loan	31 August 2022	
16	MF	(Nigeria) Ugochukwu Obi Moneke	(Nigeria) Unattached	Released	8 October 2022	
12	MF	(Bangladesh) Sahed Hossain	Bangladesh Police FC	Released	23 October 2022	
37	MF	(Bangladesh) Seikh Galib Newaz	(Bangladesh) Rahmatganj MFS	Free	24 October 2022	
6	MF	(Bangladesh) Anik Hossain	(Bangladesh) Chittagong Abahani	Free	26 October 2022	

== Competitions ==
Win Draw Loss Fixtures

=== Overall ===
Competition	First match	Last match	Final Position
BPL	10 December 2022	22 July 2023	4th
Federation Cup	20 December 2022	30 May 2023	Champions
Independence Cup	13 November 2022	26 November 2022	Quarter-finals

=== Overview ===
Competition	Record							
Competition	Pld	W	D	L	GF	GA	GD	Win %
BPL	20	9	5	6	38	20	+18	45.00
Independence Cup	4	2	0	2	5	6	−1	50.00
Federation Cup	6	5	1	0	20	8	+12	83.33
Total	30	16	6	8	63	34	+29	53.33

Source: Competitions

=== Premier League ===
Pos	Team	Pld	W	D	L	GF	GA	GD	Pts
2	Dhaka Abahani	20	12	4	4	45	18	+27	40
3	Bangladesh Police FC	20	10	5	5	39	21	+18	35
4	Mohammedan SC	20	9	5	6	38	21	+17	32
5	Sheikh Russel KC	20	8	6	6	33	30	+3	30
6	Sheikh Jamal DC	20	5	9	6	25	32	−7	24

Source: Soccerway
Rules for classification: 1) Points; 2) Goal difference; 3) Goals scored.

==== Results by round ====
Round	1	2	3	4	5	6	7	8	9	10	11	12	13	14	15	16	17	18	19	20	21	22
Ground	H	A	H	A	(Note: No Dhaka Mohammedan matchday in this round.)	H	A	H	A	H	A	A	H	A	H	(Note: No Dhaka Mohammedan matchday in this round.)	A	H	A	H	A	H
Result	W	D	D	L	–	D	L	L	W	L	W	W	D	W	L	–	W	D	L	W	W	W
Position	2	2	4	5	5	6	8	8	6	7	6	5	5	3	5	6	4	4	4	4	4	4

Source: Matches
A = Away; H = Home; W = Win; D = Draw; L = Loss; P = Postponed

==== Results summary ====
Overall								Home						Away					
Pld	W	D	L	GF	GA	GD	Pts	W	D	L	GF	GA	GD	W	D	L	GF	GA	GD
20	9	5	6	38	21	+17	32	3	4	3	20	13	+7	6	1	3	18	8	+10

Source: Soccerway

=== Matches ===
10 December 2022 1	Dhaka Mohammedan	2–0	Muktijoddha Sangsad KC	Comilla
14:30 BST (UTC+6)	Febles 51'; Diabate 86' (pen.)	Report	Sagor Sarker (yellow card) 29'; Mohammed Rashedul Islam Rashed (yellow card) 29'	Stadium: Shaheed Dhirendranath Datta Stadium; Referee: Golam Mourshed Chowdhury Nayan

24 December 2022 2	Bangladesh Police FC	0–0	Dhaka Mohammedan	Mymensingh
14:30 BST (UTC+6)	Monaem (yellow card) 20'; Joyonto Kumar Roy (yellow card) 27'; Edward Enrique Morillo Jimenéz (yellow card) 34'; Almazbek Malikov (yellow card) 34'; Mohamed Mithu Bhuiyan (yellow card) 64'; José Alexander Hernández (yellow card) 76'	Report	Manik (yellow card) 72'; Mehedi (yellow card) 77'	Stadium: Rafiq Uddin Bhuiyan Stadium; Referee: Mohammed Nasiruddin

31 December 2022 3	Dhaka Mohammedan	2–2	Chittagong Abahani	Comilla
14:30 BST (UTC+6)	Rajib Hossain (yellow card) 9'; Diabate 31' (yellow card) 52'; Manik 59'; Muzaffar Muzaffarov (yellow card) 81'	Report	Mohamed Pappu Hossain (red card) 12'; Ifeagwu Ojukwu David 29'; Pulatov (yellow card) 43'; Yacouba 45+3' (yellow card) 90'; Agbane (yellow card) 85'	Stadium: Shaheed Dhirendranath Datta Stadium; Referee: Bituraj Borua

6 January 2023 4	Sheikh Russel KC	2–0	Dhaka Mohammedan	Dhaka
14:45 BST (UTC+6)	Timur Talipov (yellow card) 4'; Abid Ahmed (yellow card) 24'; Mfon 30', 90+1'; Jamal (yellow card) 63'	Report	Roger (yellow card) 36'; Muzaffar Muzaffarov (yellow card) 86'	Stadium: Bashundhara Kings Arena; Referee: Mohammed Nasriuddin

20 January 2023 6	Dhaka Mohammedan	1–1	Sheikh Jamal DC	Comilla
15:00 BST (UTC+6)	Muzaffar Muzaffarov 29'	Report	Raihan (yellow card) 5'; Stewart 68'; Omar (yellow card) 73'	Stadium: Shaheed Dhirendranath Datta Stadium; Referee: Bituraj Barua

27 January 2023 7	Dhaka Abahani	2–0	Dhaka Mohammedan	Comilla
15:00 BST (UTC+6)	Nworah 12'; Mehedi (yellow card) 53'; Alamgir Molla (yellow card) 57'; Colindres 58'	Report		Stadium: Shaheed Dhirendranath Datta Stadium; Referee: Md Alamgir Sarker

3 February 2023 8	Dhaka Mohammedan	0–1	Bashundhara Kings	Cumilla
15:45 BST (UTC+6)		Report	Rakib (yellow card) 33'; Robinho (yellow card) 45'; Fahad (yellow card) 45+6'; Dorielton (yellow card) 67' (goal) 90+6'	Stadium: Shaheed Dhirendranath Datta Stadium; Referee: Md Alamgir Sarker

10 February 2023 9	AFC Uttara	0–6	Dhaka Mohammedan	Mymensingh
15:45 BST (UTC+6)	Jintu Mia (yellow card) 45'; Sarower Zaman Nipu (yellow card) 49'	Report	Souleymane 21' (pen.), 35', 70'; Manik (yellow card) 37'; Febles 63'; Arif Hossain 80'; Sazzad 87'	Stadium: Rafiq Uddin Bhuiyan Stadium; Referee: Md Mizanur Rahman

18 February 2023 10	Dhaka Mohammedan	3–4	Fortis FC	Comilla
15:45 BST (UTC+6)	Minhajul Abedin Ballu 21'; Souleymane 46'; Jafar (yellow card) 45+3'; Arif Hossain 67'	Report	Abdallah Omar Sajib (yellow card) 38'; Shahidul Islam Sumon (yellow card) 41'; Borhan Uddin 56'; Mojibur Rahman 64' (yellow card) 73'; Amredin (yellow card) 45+4' (goal) 70'; Danilo 79'; Mitul (yellow card) 90+3'	Stadium: Shaheed Dhirendranath Datta Stadium; Referee: Mahmud Zamil Farooque Nahid

24 February 2023 11	Rahmatganj MFS	0–1	Dhaka Mohammedan	Munshigonj
15:45 BST (UTC+6)	Habibur Rahman Nolok (yellow card) 6'; Fathullo (yellow card) 34'; Mohamed Tanvir Hossain (yellow card) 90+4'	Report	Shahriar Emon 7'; Abid Hossain (yellow card) 43'; Roger (yellow card) 60'; Manik (yellow card) 84'; Muzaffar Muzaffarov (yellow card) 90+4'	Stadium: Shaheed Bir Sreshtho Flight Lt. Matiur Rahman Stadium; Referee: Md Nasiruddin

8 April 2023 12	Muktijoddha Sangsad KC	1–6	Dhaka Mohammedan	Gopalganj
15:45 BST (UTC+6)	Mohammed Atikuzzaman 8' (yellow card) 35'; Dzingai (yellow card) 45+4'; Mahadud Hossain Fahim (yellow card) 52'	Report	Diabate 22', 37', 54' (pen.); Muzaffar Muzaffarov 42'; Emmanuel 69'; Sazzad 84'	Stadium: Sheikh Fazlul Haque Mani Stadium; Referee: Md Jalal Uddin

15 April 2023 13	Mohammedan SC	1–1	Bangladesh Police FC	Comilla
15:45 BST (UTC+6)	Emon 56'; Diabate (yellow card) 90+4'	Report	Arango 10' (yellow card) 90+5'; Mohammad Nehal (yellow card) 52'	Stadium: Shaheed Dhirendranath Datta Stadium; Referee: Md Anisur Rahman Sagor

29 April 2023 14	Chittagong Abahani	1–2	Mohammedan SC	Munshigonj
15:15 BST (UTC+6)	Md Rocky (yellow card) 22'; Ifezwu (yellow card) 30'; Anik Hossain (yellow card) 57'; Kahraba (yellow card) 62'; Md Tarek 81'	Report	Rajib Hossain (yellow card) 33'; Diabate 60' (pen.), 73'; Hasan Murad Tipu (yellow card) 85'	Stadium: Shaheed Bir Sreshtho Flight Lt. Matiur Rahman Stadium; Referee: Mahmud Zamal Farouqee Nahid

6 May 2023 15	Mohammedan SC	1–2	Sheikh Russel KC	Comilla
16:00 BST (UTC+6)	Emon (yellow card) 36'; Rajib Hossain (yellow card) 49'; Emmanuel 67' (yellow card) 90+2'; Minhajul Abedin Rakib (yellow card) 74'	Report	Jamal (yellow card) 26'; Kenneth (yellow card) 43' (goal) 51'; Monir Alam (yellow card) 61'; Brossou (yellow card) 69'; Mfon 78'; Depok Roy (yellow card) 90+4'	Stadium: Shaheed Dhirendranath Datta Stadium; Referee: Md Saymoon Hasan Sany

19 May 2023 17	Sheikh Jamal DC	0–1	Dhaka Mohammedan	Gopalganj
16:00 BST (UTC+6)		Report	Sazzad 52'	Stadium: Sheikh Fazlul Haque Mani Stadium; Referee: Bituraj Barua

26 May 2023 18	Dhaka Mohammedan	1–1	Dhaka Abahani	Comilla
16:00 BST (UTC+6)	Diabate 45+4' (pen.); Muzaffar Muzaffarov (yellow card) 80'	Report	Peter (yellow card) 80'; Kingsley 83' (pen.)	Stadium: Shaheed Dhirendranath Datta Stadium; Referee: Md Anisur Rahman Sagor

2 June 2023 19	Bashundhara Kings	2–1	Dhaka Mohammedan	Dhaka
16:00 BST (UTC+6)	Figueira 10' (yellow card) 45+3'; Rakib 40' (yellow card) 70'; Mahmudul Hasan Kiron (yellow card) 73'; Sohel (yellow card) 87'; Bishwanath (yellow card) 90+1'	Report	Emmanuel 2'; Muzaffar Muzaffarov (red card) 86'	Stadium: Bashundhara Kings Arena; Attendance: 9,474; Referee: Md Anisur Rahman Sagor

7 June 2023 20	Dhaka Mohammedan	6–0	AFC Uttara	Comilla
16:00 BST (UTC+6)	Diabate 10', 68', 89'; Emmanuel 49'; Sanowar Hossain Lal 54'; Emon 83'	Report	Younoussa Camara (yellow card) 45+2'	Stadium: Shaheed Dhirendranath Datta Stadium; Referee: Bituraj Barua

14 July 2023 21	Fortis FC	0–1	Dhaka Mohammedan	Rajshahi
16:00 BST (UTC+6)	Ariful Islam Jitu (yellow card) 27'; Danilo (yellow card) 28'; Mojibur (yellow card) 36'	Report	Sunday (yellow card) 28'; Muzaffar Muzaffarov 31'; Emon (yellow card) 84'	Stadium: Muktijuddho Sriti Stadium; Referee: Sabuj Das

22 July 2023 22	Dhaka Mohammedan	3–1	Rahmatganj MFS	Comilla
16:00 BST (UTC+6)	Emmanuel 24'; Mehedi (yellow card) 45'; Arif Hossain 48'; Diabate 54'; Duarte (yellow card) 69'	Report	Bunyod Shodiev (yellow card) 56'; Mohammed Emon Hossain 90+2'	Stadium: Shaheed Dhirendranath Datta Stadium; Referee: Jashim Akhter

=== Federation Cup ===
==== Group stages ====
Pos	Team	Pld	W	D	L	GF	GA	GD	Pts	Qualification
1	Mohammedan SC	3	2	1	0	10	2	+8	7	Advance to knockout phase
2	Rahmatganj MFS	3	2	0	1	5	2	+3	6	Advance to knockout phase
3	Sheikh Jamal DC	3	1	1	1	5	5	0	4	Advance to knockout phase
4	AFC Uttara	3	0	0	3	1	12	−11	0	

Source: Footystats
Rules for classification: Group stage tiebreakers

20 December 2022	Dhaka Mohammedan	1–0	Rahmatganj MFS	Gopalganj
14:30 BST (UTC+6)	Diabate 75'	Report		Stadium: Sheikh Fazlul Haque Mani Stadium; Referee: Md Anisur Rahman Sagor

10 January 2023	Dhaka Mohammedan	7–0	AFC Uttara	Comilla
14:45 BST (UTC+6)	Muzaffar Muzaffarov 5', 52' (yellow card) 90'; Roger 7'; Febles 39'; Sazzad 49' (pen.), 60'; Shahriar Emon 51' (yellow card) 65'	Report	Rakib Sarker (yellow card) 13'; Mohammad Rajib (yellow card) 76'	Stadium: Shaheed Dhirendranath Datta Stadium; Referee: Rimon Mahmud

31 January 2023	Dhaka Mohammedan	2–2	Sheikh Jamal DC	Gopalganj
15:00 BST	Arif Hossain 28'; Syed Rakib Khan Evan (yellow card) 33'; Miraz Molla (yellow card) 59'; Ashraful Haque Asif 71'	Report	Stewart 54' (yellow card) 76'; Sulayman Sillah 76'	Stadium: Sheikh Fazlul Haque Mani Stadium; Referee: Md Jalal Uddin

==== Knockout stages ====
18 April 2023 Quarter-finals	Mohammedan SC	4–1	Chittagong Abahani	Cumilla
15:15 BST (UTC+6)	Emmanuel 20'; Miraz Molla (yellow card) 28'; Muzaffar Muzaffarov 35'; Diabate 48', 70'; Sujon Mia (yellow card) 87'	Report	Augustine 77' (pen.)	Stadium: Shaheed Dhirendranath Datta Stadium; Referee: Md Alamgir Sarkar

9 May 2023 Semi-finals	Bashundhara Kings	1–2	Mohammedan SC	Gopalganj
15:15 BST (UTC+6)	Dorielton 43'; Asror Gafurov (yellow card) 78'; Bishwanath (yellow card) 84'	Report	Emmanuel 3'; Diabate 55'	Stadium: Sheikh Fazlul Haque Mani Stadium; Referee: Bhubon Mohon Tarafder

30 May 2023 Final	Dhaka Mohammedan	4–4 (a.e.t.) (4–2 p)	Abahani Limited Dhaka	Cumilla
15:15 BST (UTC+6)	Diabate (yellow card) 18' (goal) 57', 61', 84' (pen.), 105+4'	Report	Fahim 17' (yellow card) 64'; Raphael (yellow card) 38'; Colindres 43'; Emeka 66'; Rahmat 118'	Stadium: Shaheed Dhirendranath Datta Stadium; Referee: Md Alamgir Sarker
	Penalties
	Diabate (penalty scored); Alamgir (penalty scored); Roger (penalty scored); Emon (penalty missed); Kamrul Islam (penalty scored)		Augusto (penalty missed); Emeka (penalty scored); Yousef (penalty scored); Colindres (penalty missed)

=== Independence Cup ===
==== Group stages ====
Pos	Team	Pld	W	D	L	GF	GA	GD	Pts	Qualification
1	Sheikh Russel KC	3	2	1	0	6	1	+5	7	Advance to Knockout stage
2	Mohammedan SC	3	2	0	1	5	4	+1	6	Advance to Knockout stage
3	Fortis FC	3	1	1	1	5	5	0	4	
4	Bangladesh Navy	3	0	0	3	1	7	−6	0	

Source: GSA

13 November 2022	Dhaka Mohammedan	2–0	Bangladesh Navy FC	Munshigonj
14:00 BST (UTC+6)	Diabate 84'; Jafar 87'	Report		Stadium: Munshigonj District Stadium; Referee: Md Anisur Rahman Sagor

17 November 2022	Dhaka Mohammedan	3–1	Fortis FC	Comilla
14:00 BST (UTC+6)	Diabate 6'; Roger 26'; Jafar 39'	Report	Luiz 14'	Stadium: Comilla District Stadium; Referee: Golam Mourshed Chowdhury Nayan

21 November 2022	Dhaka Mohammedan	0–3	Sheikh Russel KC	Gopalganj
13:00 BST (UTC+6)		Report	Brossou 2'; Ibrahim 51'; Mfon 59'	Stadium: Sheikh Fazlul Haque Mani Stadium; Referee: Md Anisur Rahman Sagor

==== Knockout stages ====
26 November 2021 Quarter-finals	Bashundhara Kings	2–0	Dhaka Mohammedan	Munshigonj
13:00 BST (UTC+6)	Rakib 34'; Robson 84'	Report		Stadium: Munshigonj District Stadium; Referee: Md Anisur Rahman Sagor

== Statistics ==
=== Goalscorers ===
Rank	Player	Position	Total	BPL	Independence Cup	Federation Cup
1	(Mali) Souleymane Diabate	FW	26	16	2	8
2	(Nigeria) Sunday Emmanuel	FW	7	5	0	2
2	(Uzbekistan) Muzaffar Muzaffarov	MF	6	3	0	3
3	(Bangladesh) Sazzad Hossain	MF	5	3	0	2
4	(Bangladesh) Arif Hossain	FW	4	3	0	1
4	(Bangladesh) Shahriar Emon	MF	4	3	0	1
5	(Venezuela) Daniel Febles	FW	3	2	0	1
6	(Bangladesh) Jafar Iqbal	FW	2	0	2	0
6	(Brazil) Roger Duarte	DF	2	0	1	1
7	(Bangladesh) Ashraful Haque Asif	MF	1	0	0	1
7	(Bangladesh) Minhajul Abedin Ballu	MF	1	1	0	0
7	(Bangladesh) Sanowar Hossain Lal	MF	1	1	0	0
7	(Bangladesh) Manik Hossain Molla	DF	1	1	0	0
Total			63	38	5	20

Source: Matches
