= 2024–25 Bangladesh Premier League (football) =

17th professional season of the top-flight football league in Bangladesh

Bangladesh Premier League
- Season: 2024–25
- Dates: 29 November 2024 – 29 May 2025
- Champions: Mohammedan SC (1st BPL title 20th Bangladeshi title)
- Relegated: Dhaka Wanderers; Chittagong Abahani
- AFC Challenge League: Dhaka Abahani; Bashundhara Kings
- Bangladesh Challenge Cup: Mohammedan SC; Bashundhara Kings (as Federation Cup winners)
- Matches: 90
- Goals: 282 (3.13 per match)
- Top goalscorer: (Ghana) Samuel Boateng (Rahmatganj MFS) (21 goals)
- Biggest home win: Bashundhara Kings 7–0 Chittagong Abahani (29 November 2024)
- Biggest away win: Dhaka Wanderers 0–6 Mohammedan SC (29 November 2024)
- Highest scoring: Fakirerpool 2–7 Bashundhara Kings (20 May 2025)
- Longest winning run: Mohammedan SC (8 Matches)
- Longest unbeaten run: Mohammedan SC (8 Matches)
- Longest winless run: Chittagong Abahani (10 matches)
- Longest losing run: Chittagong Abahani (10 matches)

The 2024–25 Bangladesh Premier League, also known as the Bashundhara Group Bangladesh Premier League for sponsorship reasons, was the 17th season of the Bangladesh Premier League since its establishment in 2007. A total of 10 clubs participated in the league. The country's top-flight football competition began on 29 November 2024 and concluded on 29 May 2025. Bashundhara Kings were the defending champions, having won a record fifth title in a row.

== Teams ==
=== Changes ===
Promoted from 2023–24 BCL	Relegated from 2023–24 BPL	Withdrew from 2024 to 2025 BPL
Fakirerpool YMC; Dhaka Wanderers	None	~~Sheikh Jamal DC~~; ~~Sheikh Russel KC~~

=== Stadiums and locations ===
Locations of the 2024–25 Bangladesh Premier League teams

Team	Location	Stadium	Capacity
Dhaka Abahani	Cumilla	Shaheed Dhirendranath Stadium	18,000
Bangladesh Police FC	Mymensingh	Rafiq Uddin Bhuiyan Stadium	25,000
Bashundhara Kings	Dhaka	Bashundhara Kings Arena	14,000
Brothers Union	Munshiganj	Bir Sreshtho Matiur Rahman Stadium	10,000
Chittagong Abahani	Mymensingh	Rafiq Uddin Bhuiyan Stadium	25,000
Dhaka Wanderers	Gazipur	Shaheed Barkat Stadium	5,000
Fakirerpool YMC	Gazipur	Shaheed Barkat Stadium	5,000
Fortis FC	Dhaka	Bashundhara Kings Arena	14,000
Mohammedan SC	Cumilla	Shaheed Dhirendranath Stadium	18,000
Rahmatganj MFS	Munshiganj	Bir Sreshtho Matiur Rahman Stadium	10,000

=== Personnel, kits, sponsors ===
Team	Head coach	Captain	Kit manufacturer	Shirt sponsor (chest)
Dhaka Abahani	(Bangladesh) Maruful Haque	(Bangladesh) Mohammad Ridoy	BIRD	
Bangladesh Police FC	(Bangladesh) Mahabubul Haque Juwel	(Bangladesh) Isa Faysal	Club Manufactured	
Bashundhara Kings	(Romania) Valeriu Tita	(Brazil) Miguel Figueira	Club Manufactured	POCKET
Brothers Union	(The Gambia) Omar Sise	(Bangladesh) Mohamed Sohel Rana	Club Manufactured	LABAID
Chittagong Abahani	(Bangladesh) Saifur Rahman Moni	(Bangladesh) Tawhidul Alam Sabuz	Designex	Ashiyan Group
Dhaka Wanderers	(Bangladesh) Tajuddin Taju	(Bangladesh) Mohammad Emon	Club Manufactured	
Fakirerpool YMC	(Uzbekistan) Albert Lyapin	(Bangladesh) Raficul Islam	Enadeka	
Fortis FC	(Bangladesh) Masud Parvez Kaiser	(The Gambia) Pa Omar Babou	TORR	TORR Limited
Mohammedan SC	(Bangladesh) Alfaz Ahmed	(Mali) Souleymane Diabate	Sports Apparel Design	Max Group
Rahmatganj MFS	(Bangladesh) Kamal Babu	(Bangladesh) Md Sayde	BIRD	

=== Coaching changes ===
Team	Outgoing Coach	Manner of departure	Date of vacancy	Position in the table	Incoming Coach	Date of appointment
Bashundhara Kings	(Spain) Oscar Bruzon	Mutual Consent	7 July 2024	Pre-season	(Romania) Valeriu Tita	9 July 2024
Brothers Union	(Bangladesh) Azmol Hossain Biddyut	Mutual Consent	1 June 2024	Pre-season	(The Gambia) Omar Sise	July 2024
Bangladesh Police	(Romania) Aristică Cioabă	Mutual Consent	1 June 2024	Pre-season	(Bangladesh) Mahabubul Haque Juwel	1 August 2024
Dhaka Abahani	(Argentina) Andrés Cruciani	Mutual Consent	1 June 2024	Pre-season	(Bangladesh) Maruful Haque	17 September 2024
Fakirerpool YMC	(Bangladesh) Imtiaz Khan Lablu	Demoted to an assistant coach role	1 May 2024	Pre-season	(Uzbekistan) Albert Lyapin	1 October 2024
Dhaka Wanderers	(Bangladesh) Abu Yusuf	Mutual Consent	1 May 2024	Pre-season	(Bangladesh) Shahadat Hossain	1 November 2024
Chittagong Abahani	(Bangladesh) Md. Tajuddin Taju	Mutual Consent	1 June 2024	Pre-season	(Bangladesh) Saifur Rahman Moni	1 November 2024
Dhaka Wanderers	(Bangladesh) Shahadat Hossain	Demoted to an assistant coach role	17 April 2025	9th	(Bangladesh) Md. Tajuddin Taju	17 April 2025
Fakirerpool YMC	(Uzbekistan) Albert Lyapin	Mutual Consent	9 May 2025	8th	(Bangladesh) Sawpan Kumar Das	10 May 2025

== Foreign players ==
Each team is allowed a maximum of six foreign players, including one player from any of the Asian Football Confederation countries A team could name four foreign players on the squad of each game, including at least one player from the AFC confederation.

- Names in **bold** suggests the player was signed during the mid-season winter transfer window.
- Names in italics refer to players who have senior international cap(s) for their respective nations.

Club	Player 1	Player 2	Player 3	Player 4	Player 5	Player 6	Unregistered player(s)	Former Player(s)
Dhaka Abahani	(Brazil) **Raphael Augusto**	**(Nigeria) Emeka Ogbugh**	—N/a	—N/a	—N/a	—N/a	—N/a	—N/a
Bangladesh Police	(Brazil) **Danilo Quipapá**	**(Colombia)** **Yerson Gutierrez**	(Paraguay) Alexander Moreno	(Paraguay) **Luis Ibarra**	(Uzbekistan) **Jahongir Qurbonboyev**	—N/a	—N/a	(Paraguay) Tobias Quantina
Bashundhara Kings	(Argentina) **Juan Lescano**	(Brazil) **Daciel**	(Brazil) Fernandes	(Brazil) Miguel Figueira	(Ghana) **Evans Etti**	(Uzbekistan) **Asror Gafurov**	—N/a	(France) Jared Khasa (Nigeria) Ejeh Isaiah
Brothers Union	**(The Gambia) Assan Njie**	**(The Gambia) Edrissa Jallow**	(The Gambia) Zakaria Darboe	(Senegal) Mouhamed Becaye Diarra	(Nigeria) **Mfon Udoh**	**(Uzbekistan) Akobir Turaev**	—N/a	(The Gambia) Maxi Cessay (The Gambia) Mustapha Drammeh (Senegal) Sene Cheikh (Japan) Hiromitsu Shimo
Chittagong Abahani	**(Ivory Coast) Youssouf Bamba**	(Ghana) Diamond Kwasi Adiefe	**(Ghana) Junior Kofi Dabanka**	**(Guinea) Lansana Louis Beavogui**	**(Paraguay) Wilson Medina**	—N/a	—N/a	—N/a
Dhaka Wanderers	(Brazil) **Gustavo Ribeiro**	(The Gambia) Suleiman Sillah	(Uzbekistan) **Khusan Ganizhonov**	**(Uzbekistan)** **Shavkatjon Sattorov**	—N/a	—N/a	—N/a	—N/a
Fakirerpool YMC	**(Ivory Coast) Ben Ibrahim Ouattara**	**(Mali) Mohamed Fofana**	(Nigeria) Segun Oduduwa	(Uzbekistan) Evgeniy Kochnev	(Uzbekistan) Sardor Jakhonov	(Uzbekistan) Solibek Karimov	—N/a	(Uzbekistan) Akobir Turaev
Fortis FC	(The Gambia) Essa Jallow	(The Gambia) Omar Sarr	(The Gambia) Pa Omar Babou	**(Nigeria) Ojukwu David Ifegwu**	(Ukraine) Valeriy Gryshyn	(Uzbekistan) Jasur Jumaev	—N/a	—N/a
Mohammedan SC	(Burkina Faso) Mounzir Couldiati	(Mali) Souleymane Diabate	(Nigeria) Emmanuel Agbaji	**(Nigeria)** Sunday Emmanuel	(Uzbekistan) Muzaffar Muzaffarov	(Venezuela) **Edward Morillo**	(Ghana) Ernest Boateng	—N/a
Rahmatganj MFS	(Egypt) Mostafa Kahraba	(Ghana) Felix Tetteh	(Ghana) Mamoud Oshie	(Ghana) Samuel Boateng	(Uzbekistan) Iskandar Siddikzhonov	**(The Gambia) Solomon King Kanform**	—N/a	—N/a

=== Foreign players by confederation ===
Foreign players by confederation
AFC	Uzbekistan(11)
CAF	Burkina Faso(1), Egypt(1), (The Gambia) Gambia(8), Ghana(7), Mali(2), Nigeria(5) Senegal(2),
CONMEBOL	Argentina(1), Brazil(6), Paraguay(3), Venezuela(1)

== League table ==
Pos	Team	Pld	W	D	L	GF	GA	GD	Pts	Qualification or relegation
1	Mohammedan (Note: Mohammedan does not possess an AFC Challenge League licence.) (C)	18	13	3	2	46	16	+30	42	
2	Dhaka Abahani	18	10	5	3	31	8	+23	35	Qualification for the AFC Challenge League qualifying stage
3	Bashundhara Kings (W)	18	9	5	4	45	15	+30	32	Qualification for the AFC Challenge League qualifying stage (Note: as Federation Cup winners.)
4	Rahmatganj	18	9	3	6	39	25	+14	30	
5	Brothers Union	18	7	6	5	28	18	+10	27	
6	Fortis	18	6	9	3	24	15	+9	27	
7	Bangladesh Police	18	8	3	7	23	24	−1	27	
8	Fakirerpool	18	6	1	11	23	54	−31	19	
9	Dhaka Wanderers (R)	18	3	1	14	14	55	−41	10	Relegation to BCL
10	Chittagong Abahani (R)	18	1	0	17	7	50	−43	3	Relegation to BCL

Source: Soccerway
Rules for classification: 1) Points; 2) Goal difference; 3) Goals scored.
(C) Champion; (R) Relegated; (W) Cup Winner

== Results ==
=== Results table ===
Home \ Away	BPFC	BDK	BUL	CAL	DAL	DWC	FYMC	FFC	MSC	RMFS
Bangladesh Police	—	0–5	1–0	2–1	0–0	1–0	4–1	1–1	1–3	2–1
Bashundhara Kings	0–1	—	1–1	7–0	2–0	5–3	4–1	1–1	1–2	4–1
Brothers Union	2–1	0–0	—	2–0	0–0	5–0	3–0	0–2	0–1	0–0
Chittagong Abahani	1–0	0–2	0–2	—	0–4	0–2	0–2	0–4	1–5	0–2
Dhaka Abahani	2–0	1–0	3–0	5–0	—	1–0	6–1	0–1	0–0	1–1
Dhaka Wanderers	0–4	0–5	1–4	1–0	1–4	—	1–2	1–0	0–6	1–3
Fakirerpool	0–3	2–7	1–4	3–2	0–2	4–1	—	0–3	1–6	1–6
Fortis	1–1	1–1	1–1	1–0	0–0	1–1	1–1	—	1–1	3–1
Mohammedan	3–1	1–0	3–3	4–1	1–0	3–0	0–1	1–0	—	3–4
Rahmatganj	4–1	0–0	3–1	2–0	0–1	6–1	1–2	3–1	1–3	—

Source: Soccerway
Legend: Blue = home team win; Yellow = draw; Red = away team win.

=== Results by games ===
Team ╲ Round	1	2	3	4	5	6	7	8	9	10	11	12	13	14	15	16	17	18
Bangladesh Police	L	W	W	L	L	L	D	L	W	W	W	W	L	D	W	D	W	L
Bashundhara Kings	W	L	W	L	D	W	W	D	W	W	L	D	W	D	L	W	D	W
Brothers Union	W	D	W	L	D	W	W	L	D	L	L	W	D	D	W	W	D	L
Chittagong Abahani	L	L	L	L	L	L	L	W	L	L	L	L	L	L	L	L	L	L
Dhaka Abahani	W	W	L	W	W	D	W	W	D	W	W	D	L	D	L	W	D	W
Dhaka Wanderers	L	L	L	D	W	L	L	L	L	L	L	L	W	W	L	L	L	L
Fakirerpool	L	L	L	W	L	L	L	W	W	L	L	D	W	W	L	L	W	W
Fortis	L	D	W	D	L	D	D	D	W	W	W	D	L	D	W	D	D	W
Mohammedan	W	W	W	W	W	W	W	W	L	W	W	D	W	D	W	L	D	W
Rahmatganj	W	W	L	W	W	W	L	L	L	L	W	D	D	L	W	W	D	W

Source: Soccerway
W = Win; D = Draw; L = Lose

=== Positions by round ===
The following table lists the positions of teams after each week of matches. In order to preserve the chronological evolution, any postponed matches are not included to the round at which they were originally scheduled but added to the full round they were played immediately afterward.

Team ╲ Round	1	2	3	4	5	6	7	8	9	10	11	12	13	14	15	16	17	18
Bangladesh Police	6	6	4	6	6	7	7	7	7	7	6	5	6	6	6	6	6	7
Bashundhara Kings	1	5	3	5	5	5	5	4	3	3	3	3	3	3	3	3	3	3
Brothers Union	5	4	2	4	4	4	4	5	5	5	7	6	5	5	5	4	4	5
Chittagong Abahani	10	10	10	10	10	10	10	10	10	10	10	10	10	10	10	10	10	10
Dhaka Abahani	4	3	5	2	3	3	2	2	2	2	2	2	2	2	2	2	2	2
Dhaka Wanderers	9	9	9	9	8	8	8	9	9	9	9	9	9	9	9	9	9	9
Fakirerpool	7	8	8	8	9	9	9	8	8	8	8	8	8	8	8	8	8	8
Fortis	8	7	7	7	7	6	6	6	6	6	5	7	7	7	7	7	7	6
Mohammedan	2	1	1	1	1	1	1	1	1	1	1	1	1	1	1	1	1	1
Rahmatganj	3	2	6	3	2	2	3	3	4	4	4	4	4	4	4	5	5	4

Leader
Runners-up
Relegation to BCL

Source: Soccerway

== Season statistics ==
=== Goalscorers ===
There have been 282 goals scored in 90 matches, for an average of 3.13 goals per match. Source: Soccerway

21 Goals

- (Ghana) Samuel Boateng (Rahmatganj MFS)

19 Goals

- (Mali) Souleymane Diabate (Mohammedan SC)

11 Goals

- (Nigeria) Sunday Emmanuel (Mohammedan SC)
- (Bangladesh) Rakib Hossain (Bashundhara Kings)

10 Goals

- Al-Amin (Bangladesh Police)

8 Goals

- (The Gambia) Pa Omar Babou (Fortis)

7 Goals

- (Senegal) Cheikh Sene (Brothers Union)

6 Goals

- (Bangladesh) Piash Ahmed Nova (Fortis)
- (Bangladesh) Foysal Ahmed Fahim (Bashundhara Kings)
- (Ivory Coast) Ben Ibrahim Ouattara (Fakirerpool YMC)

5 Goals

- (Bangladesh) Nabib Newaj Jibon (Rahmatganj MFS)
- (Brazil) Miguel Figueira (Bashundhara Kings)
- (Brazil) Jonathan Fernandes (Bashundhara Kings)
- (Bangladesh) Enamul Islam Gazi (Dhaka Abahani)

4 Goals

- (Brazil) Raphael Augusto (Dhaka Abahani)
- (Bangladesh) Sourav Dewan (Mohammedan SC)
- (Bangladesh) Shekh Morsalin (Bashundhara Kings)
- (Uzbekistan) Akobir Turaev (Fakirerpool YMC & Brothers Union)
- (Nigeria) Mfon Udoh (Brothers Union)
- (The Gambia) Zakaria Darboe (Brothers Union)

3 Goals

- (Bangladesh) Md Taj Uddin (Rahmatganj MFS)
- (Nigeria) Emeka Ogbugh (Dhaka Abahani)
- (Bangladesh) Topu Barman (Bashundhara Kings)
- (Bangladesh) Mojibur Rahman Jony (Bashundhara Kings)
- (Uzbekistan) Sardor Jakhonov (Fakirerpool YMC)
- (Uzbekistan) Muzaffar Muzaffarov (Mohammedan SC)
- (Brazil) Danilo Quipapá (Bangladesh Police)
- (Bangladesh) Sumon Reza (Dhaka Abahani)
- (Bangladesh) Mohammad Ridoy (Dhaka Abahani)
- (Bangladesh) Sakib Bepari (Dhaka Wanderers)
- (Bangladesh) Md Sayed Hossen Sayem (Fakirerpool YMC)
- Dipok Roy (Bangladesh Police)
- (Bangladesh) Mohammad Ibrahim (Dhaka Abahani)
- (Bangladesh) Rajon Howladar (Rahmatganj MFS)

2 Goals

- (Senegal) Mouhamed Becaye Diarra (Brothers Union)
- (Ghana) Mamoud Oshie (Rahmatganj MFS)
- (Bangladesh) Sohel Rana (Bashundhara Kings)
- (France) Jared Khasa (Bashundhara Kings)
- Manik Hossain Molla (Bangladesh Police)
- (Bangladesh) Sazzad Hossain (Brothers Union)
- (Bangladesh) Mirajul Islam (Dhaka Abahani)
- (Ukraine) Valeriy Hryshyn (Fortis)
- (Bangladesh) Rafiqul Islam (Bashundhara Kings)
- (Bangladesh) Mohammad Abdullah (Fortis)
- (Bangladesh) Nazmul Islam Rasel (Dhaka Wanderers)
- (Bangladesh) Assaduzzaman Bablu (Dhaka Abahani)
- (Mali) Essa Jallow (Fortis)
- M. S. Bablu (Bangladesh Police)
- (Bangladesh) Jafar Iqbal (Dhaka Abahani)
- (Bangladesh) Abu Sufian Yousuf Sifat (Dhaka Wanderers)
- (Bangladesh) Tanvir Hossain (Rahmatganj MFS)
- (The Gambia) Assan Njie (Brothers Union)
- (Bangladesh) Shanto Tudu (Fakirerpool YMC)

1 Goal

- (The Gambia) Solomon King Kanform (Rahmatganj MFS)
- (Bangladesh) Minhajul Abedin Ballu (Mohammedan SC)
- (Bangladesh) Arman Foysal Akash (Dhaka Abahani)
- (Bangladesh) Eleta Kingsley (Brothers Union)
- (Bangladesh) Mehedi Hasan Mithu (Mohammedan SC)
- (Bangladesh) Kaushik Barua (Brothers Union)
- (Bangladesh) Irfan Hossain (Fakirerpool YMC)
- (Bangladesh) Imtiaz Sultan Jitu (Chittagong Abahani)
- (Bangladesh) Md Mosharaf Hossain Santa (Fakirerpool YMC)
- Joyonto Kumar Roy (Bangladesh Police)
- (Bangladesh) Mohammed Asadul Molla (Dhaka Abahani)
- (Bangladesh) Mohammed Fahim Morshed (Chittagong Abahani)
- (Bangladesh) Shahidul Islam (Dhaka Wanderers)
- (Bangladesh) Mehedi Hasan Royal (Rahmatganj MFS)
- (Bangladesh) Md Rabby Hossen Rahul (Bashundhara Kings)
- (Bangladesh) Monjurur Rahman Manik (Fortis)
- Morshedul Islam (Bangladesh Police)
- (Bangladesh) Rahmat Mia (Brothers Union)
- (Bangladesh) Raju Ahmed Zisan (Mohammedan SC)
- (Bangladesh) Kamacai Marma Aky (Fortis)
- (Bangladesh) Shuvo Raj Bongshi (Chittagong Abahani)
- (Bangladesh) Rahim Uddin (Mohammedan SC)
- (Bangladesh) Rafayel Tudu (Fakirerpool YMC)
- (Bangladesh) Saief Shamsud (Dhaka Wanderers)
- (Bangladesh) Faysal Ahmed (Chittagong Abahani)
- (Bangladesh) Shahriar Emon (Dhaka Abahani)
- (Bangladesh) Saif Shamsud (Dhaka Wanderers)
- (Bangladesh) Redwan Hussein Sumon (Chittagong Abahani)
- (Nigeria) Ojukwu David Ifegwu (Fortis)
- (Bangladesh) Md Sadik Ahmed (Dhaka Wanderers)
- (Uzbekistan) Asror Gofurov (Bashundhara Kings)
- (Bangladesh) Md Saiful Islam (Chittagong Abahani)
- (Bangladesh) Shakil Hossain (Dhaka Abahani)
- (Bangladesh) Shakil Ali (Dhaka Wanderers)
- Shah Quazem Kirmane (Bangladesh Police)
- (Burkina Faso) Mounzir Coulidiati (Mohammedan SC)
- (The Gambia) Maxi Cessay (Brothers Union)
- (Bangladesh) Manzurul Karim (Dhaka Wanderers)
- (Bangladesh) Tias Das (Fakirerpool YMC)
- (Uzbekistan) Jakhongir Kurbonboev (Bangladesh Police)
- (Uzbekistan) Khusan Ganizhonov (Dhaka Wanderers)
- (Bangladesh) Jewel Rana (Brothers Union)
- (Bangladesh) Fazlay Rabbi (Chittagong Abahani)
- (The Gambia) Mustapha Drammeh (Brothers Union)
- (Cameroon) Princwall Mutah (Dhaka Wanderers)
- (Bangladesh) Mahbub Alam (Mohammedan SC)
- (The Gambia) Omar Sarr (Fortis)
- (Ghana) Ernest Boateng (Mohammedan SC)
- (Ghana) Felix Tetteh (Rahmatganj MFS)
- (Nigeria) Emmanuel Tony Agbaji (Mohammedan SC)
- (Uzbekistan) Eevgeniy Kochnev (Fakirerpool YMC)

=== Own goals ===
† Bold Club indicates winner of the match.

Player	Club	Opponent	Result	Date	Ref
(Bangladesh) Md Salim Reza	Chittagong Abahani	Mohammedan SC	1–5	4 January 2025	
(Bangladesh) Tutul Hossain Badsha	Bashundhara Kings	Fakirerpool YMC	5–1	10 January 2025	

=== Hat-tricks ===
† Bold Club indicates winner of the match.

Player	For	Against	Result	Date	Ref
(Ghana) Samuel Boateng^{6}	Rahmatganj MFS	Dhaka Wanderers	(H) 6–1	4 January 2025	
(Bangladesh) Rakib Hossain^{4}	Bashundhara Kings	Fakirerpool YMC	(A) 7–2	20 May 2025	
(Ghana) Samuel Boateng	Rahmatganj MFS	Bangladesh Police FC	(H) 4–1	27 May 2025	
(Mali) Souleymane Diabate^{5}	Mohammedan SC	Fakirerpool YMC	(A) 6–1	27 May 2025	
(Bangladesh) Shekh Morsalin	Bashundhara Kings	Dhaka Wanderers	(H) 5–3	27 May 2025	

=== Most assists ===
As of 29 May 2025

Rank	Player	Team	Assists
1	(Bangladesh) Sohel Rana	Bashundhara Kings	8
1	(Uzbekistan) Muzaffar Muzaffarov	Mohammedan SC	8
3	(Bangladesh) Rakib Hossain	Bashundhara Kings	7
4	(Brazil) Miguel Figueira	Bashundhara Kings	6
4	(Egypt) Mostafa Kahraba	Rahmatganj MFS	6
4	(Bangladesh) Md Taj Uddin	Mohammedan SC	6
4	(Egypt) Mostafa Kahraba	Rahmatganj MFS	6

=== Clean sheets by goalkeepers ===
As of 29 May 2025

Rank	Player	Club	Matches	Cleansheets	Clean sheets %
1	(Bangladesh) Mitul Marma	Dhaka Abahani	15	11	60%
2	(Bangladesh) Rakibul Hasan Tushar	Bangladesh Police FC	17	5	28%
2	(Bangladesh) Md Sarwar Jahan Nipu	Fortis FC	13	5	38%
3	(Bangladesh) Sujon Hossain	Mohammedan SC	11	4	36%
3	(Bangladesh) Pappu Hossain	Brothers Union	9	4	44%

=== Teams with the most Clean Sheets ===
Rank	Team	Matches	Cleansheets	Clean sheets %
1	Dhaka Abahani	18	11	61.00%
2	Mohammedan SC	17	7	41.00%
2	Bashundhara Kings	18	7	39.00%
2	Brothers Union	18	7	39.00%
5	Bangladesh Police FC	18	6	33.00%
6	Fortis FC	18	5	28.00%
7	Rahmatganj MFS	17	4	24.00%
8	Dhaka Wanderers	18	2	11.00%
8	Chittagong Abahani	18	2	11.00%
8	Fakirerpool YMC	18	2	11.00%

=== Discipline ===
==== Player ====
As of 29 May 2025

- Most yellow cards: 8
  - (Bangladesh) Sohel Rana (Bashundhara Kings)

As of 29 May 2025

- Most red cards: 1
  - (13 players)

==== Clubs ====
- (yellow card) Yellow cards:

As of 29 May 2025

Rank	Club	Yellow cards
1	Bashundhara Kings	35
2	Mohammedan SC	34
3	Chittagong Abahani	33
3	Dhaka Wanderers	33
3	Brothers Union	33
6	Dhaka Abahani	29
7	Bangladesh Police FC	27
8	Fortis FC	26
9	Fakirerpool YMC	22
10	Rahmatganj MFS	20
Total		292

- (red card) Red cards:

As of 29 May 2025

Rank	Club	Red cards/Sent off
1	Fortis FC	3
1	Mohammedan SC	3
2	Bangladesh Police FC	2
2	Brothers Union	2
3	Fakirerpool YMC	1
3	Dhaka Abahani	1
3	Bashundhara Kings	1
Total		13

== See also ==
- 2024 Bangladesh Challenge Cup
- 2024–25 Federation Cup (Bangladesh)
- 2024–25 Bangladesh Championship League
