= Minhajul Abedin Ballu =

Bangladeshi footballer

Minhajul Abedin Rakib
Personal information
- Full name: Minhajul Abedin Rakib Ballu
- Date of birth: 16 September 2001 (age 25)
- Place of birth: Dhaka, Bangladesh
- Height: 1.78 m (5 ft 10 in)
- Position: Central midfielder

Team information
- Current team: Mohammedan
- Number: 7

Youth career
- 2013–2015: Arambagh FA

Senior career*
Years	Team	Apps	(Gls)
2015–2016	Muslim Institute		
2016–2017	T&T Club		
2017–2018	Farashganj	6	(1)
2018–2019	Brothers Union	20	(2)
2019–2021	Muktijoddha	15	(0)
2021–	Mohammedan	36	(3)

International career^{‡}
2015	Bangladesh U16	6	(1)
Medal record
Representing Bangladesh
SAFF U-16 Championship
Winner	2015 Bangladesh	Team
- * Club domestic league appearances and goals as of 29 May 2024 ‡ National team caps and goals as of 18 September 2015

Minhajul Abedin Rakib (Bengali: মিনহাজুল আবেদিন রাকিব, born 16 September 2001), also known as Ballu, is a Bangladeshi professional footballer who plays as a midfielder for Bangladesh Premier League club Mohammedan SC.

== Early career ==
Ballu began his career at Arambagh Football Academy under the guiadance of coach Ibrahim Khalil Kala.

== Club career ==
Ballu participated in the Dhaka Third Division Football League in 2015 with The Muslim Institute.

He began his Premier League journey with Farashganj SC during the 2017–18 Bangladesh Premier League.

In August 2023, Ballu played three games as a guest player for Bangladesh Army in the 2023 Durand Cup.

On 2 February 2024, Ballu scored the only goal as Mohammedan SC defeated Bashundhara Kings in the 2023–24 Bangladesh Premier League to become the first club to defeat Kings at the Bashundhara Kings Arena. He was named Man of the Match following the games conclusion, and was also rewarded with Tk 25,000 from Mohapagol, the largest supporter club of Mohammedan.

== International career ==
Ballu captained Bangladesh at U14 level at the AFC U-14 Championship 2014 qualifiers held in Myanmar.

He was part of the Bangladesh U16 team that won the 2015 SAFF U-16 Championship, where Ballu scored in a 4–0 victory over Sri Lanka U16 during the group stages. In the same year, Ballu also represented the Bangladesh U16 team during the 2016 AFC U-16 Championship qualifiers held on home soil.

== Career statistics ==
As of 29 May 2024.

Club	Season	League			Cup (Note: Appearance(s) in Bangladesh Federation Cup)		Other		Continental		Total	
Club	Season	Division	Apps	Goals	Apps	Goals	Apps	Goals	Apps	Goals	Apps	Goals
Farashganj SC	2017–18	Bangladesh Premier League	6	1	0	0	0	0	—		6	1
Brothers Union	2018–19	Bangladesh Premier League	20	2	2	0	1 (Note: Appearance(s) in Bangladesh Independence Cup)	0	—		23	2
Muktijoddha Sangsad	2019–20	Bangladesh Premier League	0	0	0	0	—		—		0	0
Muktijoddha Sangsad	2020–21	Bangladesh Premier League	15	0	2	0	—		—		17	0
Muktijoddha Sangsad	Muktijoddha Sangsad total		15	0	2	0	0	0	0	0	17	0
Mohammedan SC	2021–22	Bangladesh Premier League	9	0	1	0	2	1	—		12	1
Mohammedan SC	2022–23	Bangladesh Premier League	11	1	4	0	0	0	—		15	1
Mohammedan SC	2023–24	Bangladesh Premier League	16	2	5	0	4	1	—		25	3
Mohammedan SC	2024–25	Bangladesh Premier League	0	0	0	0	—		—		0	0
Mohammedan SC	Mohammedan SC total		36	3	10	0	6	2	0	0	52	5
Career total			77	6	14	0	7	2	0	0	98	8

== Honours ==
Mohammedan SC

- Bangladesh Premier League: 2024–25
- Federation Cup: 2022–23

Bangladesh U16

- SAFF U-16 Championship: 2015
