= Agbaji =

Agbaji is a surname. Notable people with the surname include:

- Emmanuel Tony Agbaji (born 1992), Nigerian footballer
- Ochai Agbaji (born 2000), American basketball player
