= Omar Faruk Babu =

Bangladeshi footballer

Omar Faruk
Personal information
- Full name: Omar Faruk Babu
- Date of birth: 5 August 1994 (age 32)
- Place of birth: Noakhali, Bangladesh
- Height: 1.63 m (5 ft 4 in)
- Position: Central midfielder

Senior career*
Years	Team	Apps	(Gls)
2010–2011	Rahmatganj MFS		
2011–2016	Team BJMC		
2017–2023	Sheikh Jamal DC	93	(0)
2023–2025	Mohammedan	4	(0)

International career
2009	Bangladesh U16		(0)
2014	Bangladesh U23		(0)
2013	Bangladesh	2	(0)
- * Club domestic league appearances and goals

Omar Faruk Babu (Bengali: ওমর ফারুক বাবু, Bengali pronunciation: [omor faɾuk babu]; born 5 August 1994) is a retired Bangladeshi professional footballer who played as a midfielder. He last played for Mohammedan SC in the Bangladesh Premier League. He was member of the Bangladesh national team during the 2013 SAFF Championship.

== Career statistics ==
=== International ===
On 3 September 2013, Faruk made his debut for the senior national team against India in a 1–1 draw during the 2013 SAFF Championship.

As of 5 September 2013.

National team	Year	Apps	Goals
Bangladesh	2013	2	0
Total		2	0

== Honours ==
Mohammedan SC

- Bangladesh Premier League: 2024–25
