= Muzaffar Muzaffarov =

Uzbek professional football player (born 1995)

Personal information
- Full name: Muzaffar Muzaffarov
- Date of birth: 12 April 1995 (age 31)
- Place of birth: Margilan, Uzbekistan
- Height: 1.81 m (5 ft 11 in)
- Position: Midfielder

Team information
- Current team: Mohammedan
- Number: 17

Youth career
- Pakhtakor

Senior career*
Years	Team	Apps	(Gls)
2014	Neftchi	0	(0)
2015–2017	Sogdiana	52	(5)
2017	Neftchi	25	(5)
2018	AGMK	23	(4)
2019	Metallurg BK	24	(5)
2020	FK Kokand 1912	10	(0)
2021	Turon	23	(2)
2022	Dinamo Samarqand	10	(0)
2022–	Mohammedan	68	(18)
2023	→ Dhaka Abahani (loan)	0	(0)
- * Club domestic league appearances and goals as of 24 May 2026

Muzaffar Muzaffarov (born 12 April 1995) is an Uzbek professional football player who plays as a midfielder for Bangladesh Premier League club Mohammedan SC.

== Club career ==
In 2009, Muzaffar participated in a football competition in Spain with Pakhtakor FC. He was supposed to train with Real Madrid for six months following the tournament, however, due to passport problems he was unable to return to Spain. In 2014, he played for the reserves team of FC Neftchi Fergana before Davron Fayziev signed him at FC Sogdiana Jizzakh, the following year. He returned to Neftchi in 2017.

After a disappointing spell with FC Dinamo Samarqand, Muzaffar moved abroad, joining Bangladesh Premier League club Mohammedan SC in 2022. He played an instrumental role as Mohammedan won the 2022–23 Federation Cup, the club's first silverware in 9 years.

In July 2023, he joined Abahani Limited Dhaka on loan for the 2023–24 AFC Cup qualifying play-offs. He remained with Mohammedan for the 2023–24 season. Muzaffar's performances during the 2023–24 Independence Cup earned him significant recognition from the local media.

== Honours ==
Dhaka Mohammedan

- Bangladesh Premier League: 2024–25
- Federation Cup: 2022–23
