= Mojammel Hossain Nira =

Bangladeshi footballer (born 1998)

Personal information
- Full name: Mojammel Hossain Nira
- Date of birth: 5 October 1998 (age 28)
- Place of birth: Noakhali, Bangladesh
- Position: Full-back

Team information
- Current team: Brothers Union
- Number: 36

Senior career*
Years	Team	Apps	(Gls)
2013	Dhaka City United		
2014	Bangladesh Boys		
2015	Victoria SC		
2016–2017	Feni SC		
2017–2018	Rahmatganj MFS	20	(0)
2018–2022	Sheikh Jamal DC	22	(0)
2022–2024	Fortis	13	(1)
2024–	Brothers Union	0	(0)
- * Club domestic league appearances and goals as of 29 March 2024

Mojammel Hossain Nira (Bengali: মোজাম্মেল হোসেন নীরা; born 5 October 1998) is a Bangladeshi professional footballer who plays as a full-back for Bangladesh Football League club Brothers Union.

== Early life ==
Nira graduated from Choumohoni Government SA College Noakhali, and initially played in the Pioneer Football League in Feni, before joining Dhaka City United in Dhaka Third Division Football League.

== Club career ==
In August 2022, Nira joined newly promoted Bangladesh Football League club, Fortis FC. On 20 May 2023, he scored his first top-tier goal against Muktijoddha Sangsad KC in a 2–0 victory.
