= Pappu Hossain =

Bangladeshi footballer

Personal information
- Full name: Mohamed Pappu Hossain
- Date of birth: 7 April 1999 (age 27)
- Place of birth: Dhaka, Bangladesh
- Height: 1.80 m (5 ft 11 in)
- Position: Goalkeeper

Team information
- Current team: Dhaka Abahani
- Number: 20

Youth career
- 2009–2012: Arambagh FA
- 2013: Mohammedan SC U18

Senior career*
Years	Team	Apps	(Gls)
2014–2017	Arambagh KS		(0)
2017–2022	Saif SC	41	(0)
2019	→ Mohammedan SC (loan)	11	(0)
2022–2023	Chittagong Abahani	12	(0)
2023–2024	Dhaka Abahani	5	(0)
2024–2025	Brothers Union	11	(0)
2025–	Dhaka Abahani	0	(0)

International career^{‡}
2019–2023	Bangladesh U23	5	(0)
Medal record
Representing Bangladesh
SAFF U-18 Championship
Runner-up	2017 Bhutan	Team
- * Club domestic league appearances and goals as of 27 May 2025 ‡ National team caps and goals as of 17 October 2023

Mohamed Pappu Hossain (Bengali: মোহামদ পাপ্পু হোসাইন; born 7 April 1999) is a Bangladeshi professional footballer who plays as a goalkeeper for Bangladesh Premier League club Abahani Limited Dhaka.

== Early life ==
Pappu trained under Ibrahim Khalil Kala at Arambagh Football Academy starting in 2009. He also participated in the 2011 JFA Cup and the 2012 Under-14 Festival Football Tournament in Nepal. In 2013, he had the opportunity to practice with the Under-18 team of Mohammedan SC.

== Club career ==
Pappu Hossain started his senior career with Arambagh KS. He joined Saif Sporting Club in 2017, where he won the award for best goalkeeper in the Bangladesh Premier League from the Bangladesh Football Supporters Forum. He was also part of the club's 2018 AFC Cup qualification squad. In 2019, he was loaned to Mohammedan SC.

== International career ==
In October 2019, Pappu gets his first-ever senior national team call up for a FIFA friendly against Bhutan.

In November 2019, Pappu got a U-23 call up for 2019 South Asian Games.

In July 2023, he was selected in the main squad for the 2022 Asian Games.

== Personal life ==
He is the nephew of Bangladesh national team player Sohel Rana. His older brother Sujon Hossain also plays as a goalkeeper.
