= Sujon Hossain =

Bangladeshi association football player

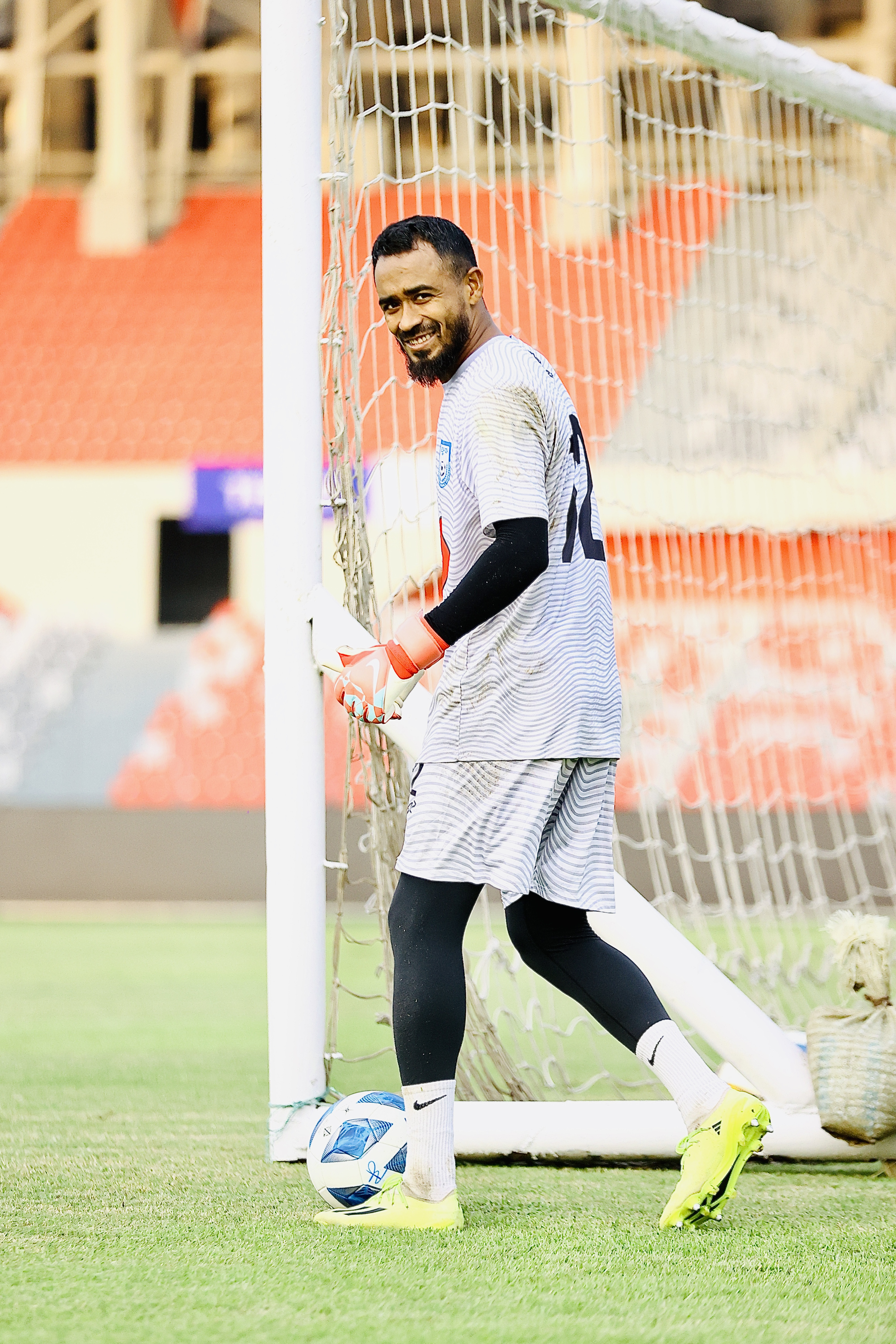

Personal information
- Full name: Mohamed Sujon Hossain
- Date of birth: 5 August 1996 (age 30)
- Place of birth: Dhaka, Bangladesh
- Height: 1.80 m (5 ft 11 in)
- Position: Goalkeeper

Team information
- Current team: Mohammedan
- Number: 1

Youth career
- 2008–2009: Arambagh FA

Senior career*
Years	Team	Apps	(Gls)
2010–2011	Arambagh		(0)
2012	Beanibazar		(0)
2013	Dhaka United		(0)
2014	Agrani Bank		(0)
2015	Mohammedan		(0)
2016–2019	Sheikh Jamal	1	(0)
2020–	Mohammedan	78	(0)

International career^{‡}
2013	Bangladesh U19	2	(0)
2024–	Bangladesh	1	(0)
- * Club domestic league appearances and goals as of 27 May 2025 ‡ National team caps and goals as of 6 September 2025

Mohamed Sujon Hossain (Bengali: মোহামদ সুজন হোসাইন; born 5 August 1996) is a Bangladeshi professional footballer who plays as a goalkeeper for Bangladesh Premier League club Mohammedan SC and the Bangladesh national team.

== Early life ==
Sujon's family hails from Rajbari District. Among four brothers, Sujon is the oldest son of Yusuf Jamriddar and Kulsoom Jamriddar. Since 2009, he worked as a ballboy at the Bangabandhu National Stadium and along with his younger brother, Pappu Hossain, he served as a ballboy when Argentina played Nigeria at the stadium in 2011. Sujon used to play as a striker in local tournaments, before him and his brother were both trained as goalkeepers, by Arambagh Football Academy coach Ibrahim Khalil Kala. He also played in the Pioneer League under the same coach.

== Club career ==
Hossain played as a junior goalkeeper of Arambagh KS in 2010 and was made first choice during the 2010–11 Bangladesh League. However, his time in the top-flight was cut short after he joined Beanibazar SC for the 2012 Championship League. In 2015, he made a return to the top-flight with Mohammedan SC. After a season with the Black and Whites, he spent three years with Sheikh Jamal Dhanmondi Club before returning in 2019.

He impressed during the 2019 Federation Cup and soon was made Mohammedan's first choice goalkeeper. Sujan displayed a man-of-the-match performance during the final of the 2022 Federation Cup against arch-rivals Abahani Limited Dhaka. However, he had to be substituted by Ahsan Habib Bipu in extra time due to an injury as Mohammedan went on to win 4–2 on tiebreakers. This was also the club's first major trophy in nine years.

== International career ==
In 2013, Sujon represented Bangladesh U19 during the 2014 AFC U-19 Championship qualification and put on a man-of-the-match display during a 1–0 victory over Kuwait U19. In 2015, he was included in the Bangladesh U23 team for the 2016 AFC U-23 Championship qualification.

On 30 May 2024, Sujon received his maiden Bangladesh national team callup for 2026 FIFA World Cup qualification – AFC second round matches against Australia and Lebanon.

On 6 September 2025, he made his senior international debut in a 0–0 draw against Nepal in a friendly held at the Dasharath Stadium in Kathmandu, Nepal.

== Personal life ==
Sujon is the nephew of Bangladesh national team midfielder, Sohel Rana.

== Career statistics ==
=== International ===
As of 6 September 2025.

Bangladesh national team
Year	Apps	Goals
2025	1	0
Total	1	0

== Honours ==
Mohammedan SC

- Federation Cup: 2022–23
