= Emmanuel Tony Agbaji =

Nigerian professional footballer

Emmanuel Agbaji
Personal information
- Full name: Emmanuel Tony Agbaji
- Date of birth: 21 November 1992 (age 33)
- Place of birth: Makurdi, Nigeria
- Height: 1.85 m (6 ft 1 in)
- Position: Centre-back

Team information
- Current team: Mohammedan

Youth career
- 2009–2011: Lobi Stars Academy

Senior career*
Years	Team	Apps	(Gls)
2011–2018	Lobi Stars	84	(2)
2019–2020	Nam Định	40	(4)
2022–2023	Lobi Stars	10	(1)
2023–2025	Mohammedan SC	21	(3)
2025–2026	Bashundhara Kings	11	(0)
2026–	Mohammedan	1	(0)
- * Club domestic league appearances and goals

Emmanuel Tony Agbaji (born 21 November 1992) is a Nigerian professional footballer who plays as a centre-back for Bangladesh Premier League club Mohammedan.

== Club career ==
=== Lobi Stars ===
Emmanuel was born in Nigeria. Since his childhood In 2009, he joined Lobi Stars Academy in Makurdi, Nigeria, then signed his first professional contract with Lobi Stars senior team in 2011. Emmanuel was the longest-serving player for Lobi Stars and was the team's captain on several occasions. He has also won in the Nigerian Premier League in 2018 and played CAF Champions League for Lobi Stars.

=== Nam Định ===
In January 2019, he moved to Vietnam and signed with CLB Nam Định. In the 2019 season of V-League, Emmanuel played 24 matches in the league and was an instrumental part of the Nam Định squad. In January 2020, Emmanuel extended his contract with Nam Định for an additional season. He was released at the end of the 2020 campaign.

Return to Lobi Stars

After a 14-month break from football, Emmanuel resigned for his boyhood club Lobi stars. He scored his first goal since rejoining the club in an NPFL league match against Wikki Tourists FC on 10 July 2022 in the 60th minute. In the same match, he also missed an 89th-minute penalty and appeared to have cost the team 3 points, however teammate Godfrey Utin scored the winner 4 minutes later to win the match 3–2.

=== Mohammedan ===
He signed for Mohammedan in 2026.

== Honours ==
Lobi Stars

- Nigerian Professional Football League: 2018
- Nigerian Super Cup: 2018

Mohammedan SC

- Bangladesh Premier League: 2024–25
