= Sunday Emmanuel (footballer) =

Nigerian professional footballer

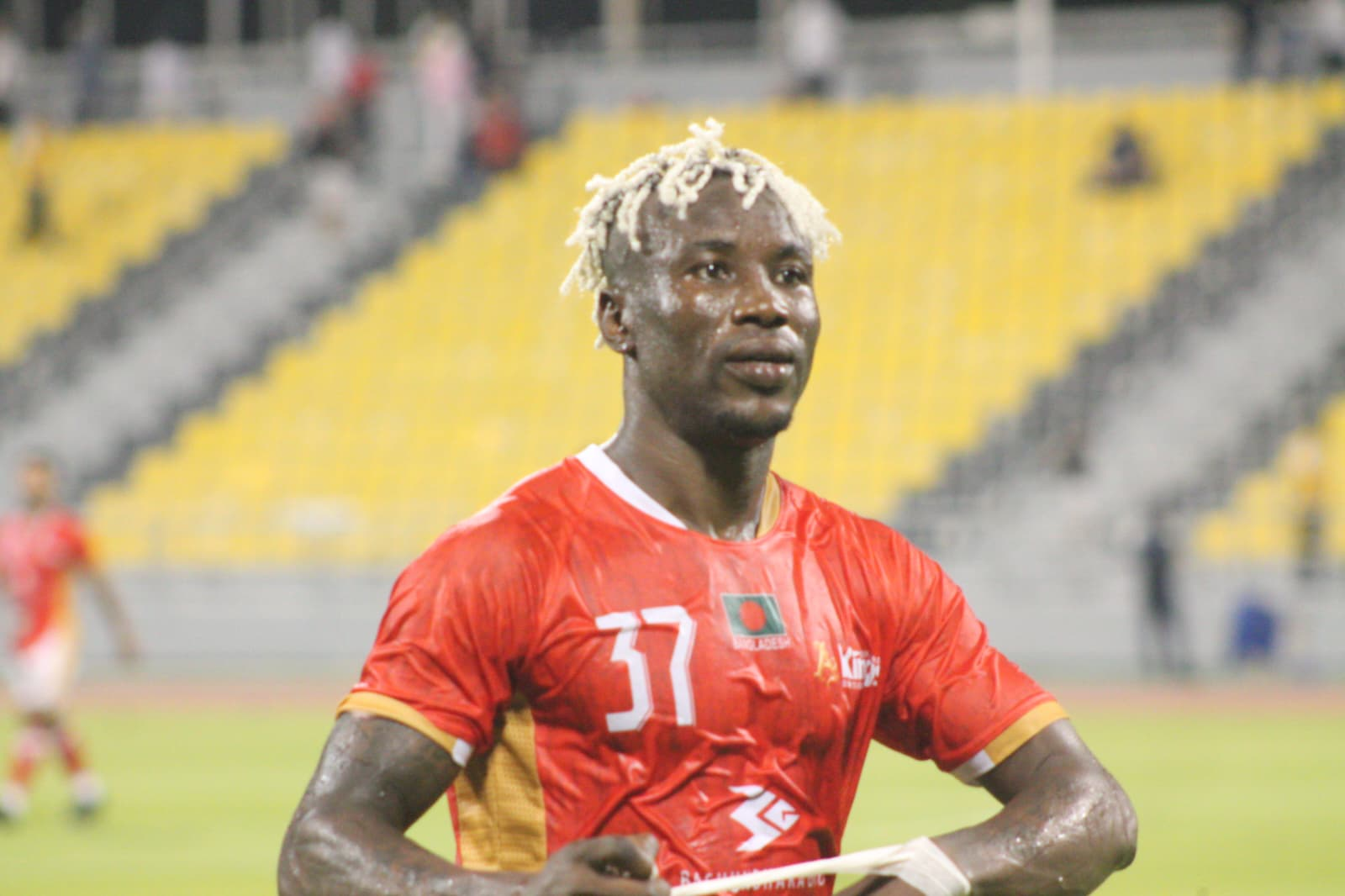

Personal information
- Full name: Sunday Chukwuemeka Emmanuel
- Date of birth: 25 February 1992 (age 34)
- Place of birth: Lagos, Nigeria
- Height: 1.77 m (5 ft 9 1/2 in)
- Position: Striker

Team information
- Current team: Mohammedan

Youth career
- –2009: Gombe United
- 2009–2011: Sunshine Stars

Senior career*
Years	Team	Apps	(Gls)
2011–2012	Thanh Hóa	52	(15)
2013	Bình Dương	18	(3)
2014	Thanh Hóa	11	(3)
2014	Quảng Ninh	8	(4)
2014–2015	SV Grödig	15	(2)
2015–2016	Feirense	17	(0)
2016	Thanh Hóa	15	(7)
2017	Becamex Bình Dương	12	(3)
2017–2018	XSKT Can Tho	10	(2)
2020	Lincoln Red Imps	4	(3)
2021	Sunshine Stars	4	(0)
2021	Al-Jalil SC		
2023–2025	Mohammedan	40	(16)
2025–2026	Bashundhara Kings	11	(6)
2026–	Mohammedan	1	(0)

International career^{‡}
2012–2014	Nigeria	3	(0)
- * Club domestic league appearances and goals as of 6 October 2026 ‡ National team caps and goals as of 05:05, 8 October 2014 (UTC)

Sunday Chukwuemeka Emmanuel (born 25 February 1992) is a Nigerian professional footballer who plays as a striker for Bangladesh Premier League club Mohammedan.

== Career ==
Emmanuel started his career in Nigeria before playing for a host of Vietnamese clubs. In 2014, he was transferred to SV Grödig of Austria.

He made his international debut against Angola.

Emmanuel joined Bashundhara Kings in 2025. He made his debut for Bashundhara Kings on 12 August 2025 against Al-Karamah during the preliminary stage of the 2025–26 AFC Challenge League.

He signed for Mohammedan in 2026.

== Honours ==
Mohammedan SC

- Bangladesh Premier League: 2024–25
- Federation Cup: 2022–23
