= Mehedi Hasan Mithu =

Bangladeshi footballer

Mehedi Mithu
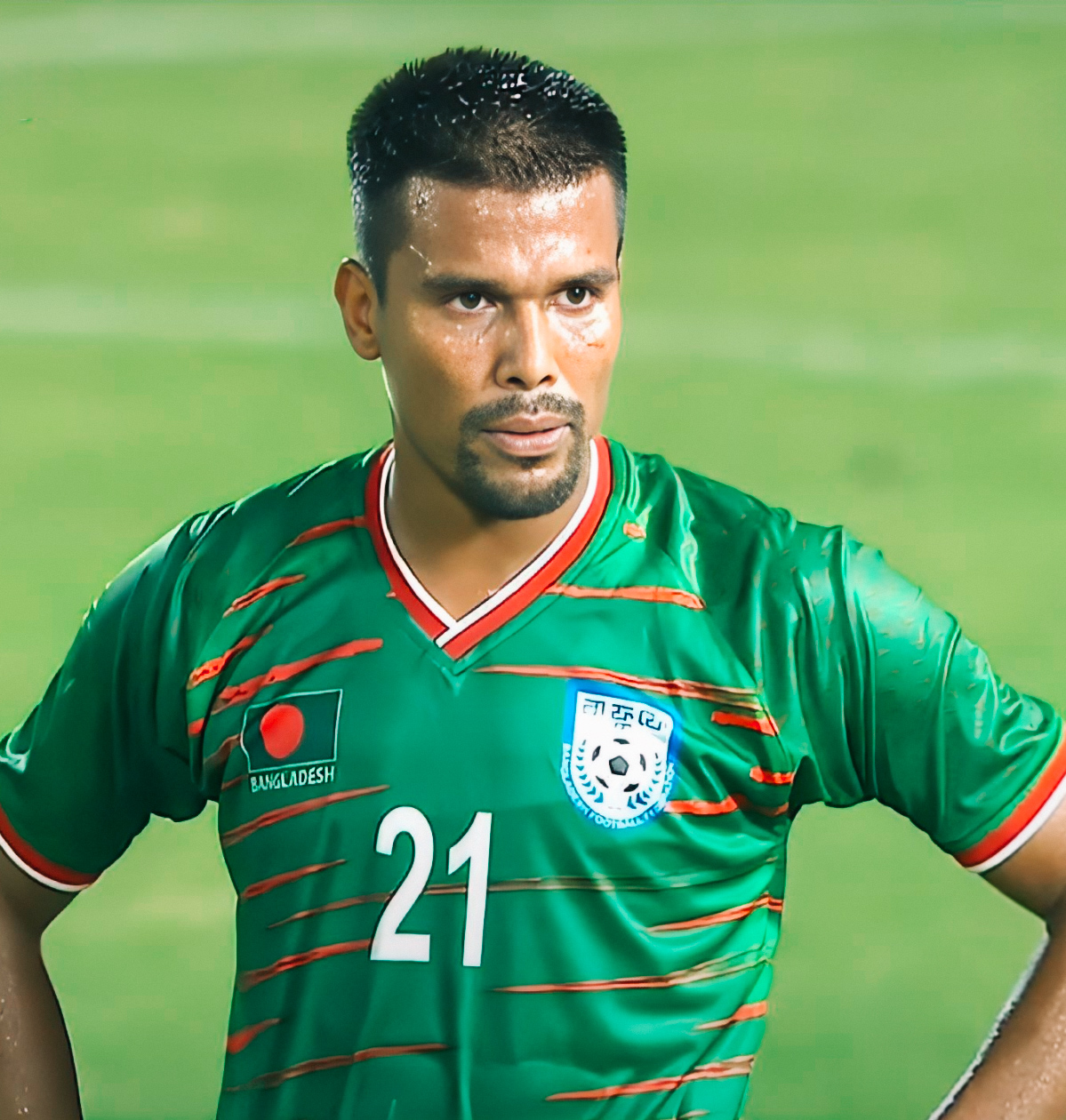
- Mithu with Bangladesh in 2023

Personal information
- Full name: Mohammad Mehedi Hasan Mithu
- Date of birth: 24 October 1994 (age 32)
- Place of birth: Bhuruingamari, Kurigram, Bangladesh
- Height: 1.78 m (5 ft 10 in)
- Position: Defender

Team information
- Current team: Chattogram City
- Number: 4

Senior career*
Years	Team	Apps	(Gls)
2011–2012	Kawran Bazar PS		
2012–2013	T&T Club Motijheel		
2012–	Bangladesh Army	0	(0)
2019	Chittagong Abahani	2	(0)
2019–2021	Muktijoddha Sangsad	26	(0)
2021–2022	Bashundhara Kings	0	(0)
2022	→ Muktijoddha Sangsad (loan)	9	(0)
2022–2026	Mohammedan SC	52	(1)
2026–	Chattogram City	2	(0)

International career^{‡}
2021–2024	Bangladesh	5	(0)
- * Club domestic league appearances and goals as of 5 October 2026 ‡ National team caps and goals as of 5 October 2026

Mohammad Mehedi Hasan Mithu (Bengali: মোহাম্মদ মেহেদী হাসান মিঠু; 24 October 1994) is a Bangladeshi professional footballer who plays as a defender for Bangladesh Premier League club Chattogram City and the Bangladesh national team. As a versatile defender, Mithu can play as a centre-back, right back or left back. He is also an active soldier for the Bangladesh Army.

== Club career ==
Mithu joined Chattogram City for the 2026–27 Bangladesh Football League season.

== Honours ==
Bashundhara Kings

- Bangladesh Premier League: 2021–22

Mohammedan SC

- Bangladesh Premier League: 2024–25
- Federation Cup: 2022–23
