= District Stadium, Mymensingh =

Multipurpose stadium in Bangladesh

Coordinates: 24°46′2.41″N 90°23′23.44″E

- জেলা স্টেডিয়াম, ময়মনসিংহ
- Mymensingh Stadium
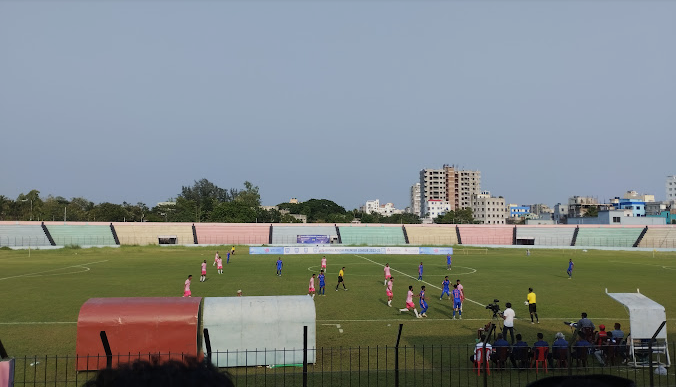
- The stadium during a 2022–23 BPL encounter between Police and AFC Uttara
- Interactive map of District Stadium, Mymensingh
- Former names: Rafiq Uddin Bhuiyan Stadium
- Address: Police Lines Road; Mymensingh; Bangladesh
- Owner: Bangladesh Sports Ministry; Mymensingh Sports Council
- Capacity: 25,000
- Surface: Grass

Construction
- Built: 1961

Tenants
- Chittagong Abahani (2024–25); Bangladesh Police FC (2023–25)

District Stadium, Mymensingh (Bengali: জেলা স্টেডিয়াম, ময়মনসিংহ), also known as Rafiq Uddin Bhuiyan Stadium or simply Mymensingh Stadium, is located by the side of Police Lines Road in the district of Mymensingh, Bangladesh. It is a multipurpose stadium, where cricket, football and cultural programs take place.

== History ==
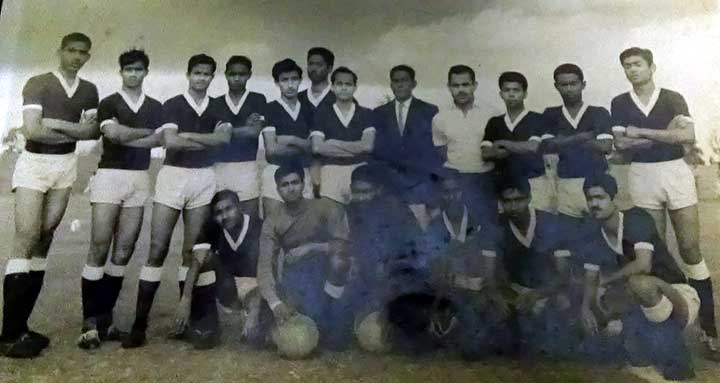
East Pakistan Youth Football Team at the Mymensingh Stadium in 1968

The stadium was built in 1961, and the first major tournament it hosted was the Pakistan National Youth Football Championship (East Zone) in 1968. The tournament was won by East Pakistan Combined University, defeating the East Pakistan Youth Football Team 1–0 in extra time.

In 1996, the stadium was named after late politician Rafiq Uddin Bhuiyan.

It was also used for zonal games during the 2004 National Football League. The stadium first hosted a Bangladesh Premier League game during the 2016 edition, and during the first match it hosted on 5 August 2016, an attendance of 15,000 spectators was recorded in the game between Chittagong Abahani and Sheikh Jamal Dhanmondi Club.

In 2025, the interim government of Bangladesh renamed the stadium as District Stadium, Mymensingh.

== Bangladesh Football League ==
- The stadium was one of the seven venues to host games for the 2016 BPL.
- The stadium served as the home venue of both Arambagh KS and Saif Sporting Club during the 2018–19 BPL.
- The stadium again served as the home venue of Saif Sporting Club during the 2019–20 BPL.
- AFC Uttara and Bangladesh Police FC acquired the stadium as their home venue for the 2022–23 BPL.
- Bangladesh Police FC and Mohammedan SC used the stadium as their home venue for the 2023–24 BPL.
- Bangladesh Police FC and Chittagong Abahani will use the stadium as their home venue for the 2024–25 BPL.

== List of first-class cricket ==
- 27 November 2000: Biman Bangladesh Airlines v Dhaka Division (Green Delta National Cricket League 2000/01)
- 9 January 2002: Dhaka Division v Sylhet Division (Green Delta National Cricket League 2000/01)
- 23 January 2002: Dhaka Division v Chittagong Division (Ispahani Mirzapore Tea 2001-02 National Cricket League)
- 7 February 2002: Dhaka Division v Rajshahi Division (Ispahani Mirzapore Tea 2001–02 National Cricket League)

== See also ==
- Stadiums in Bangladesh
- Tangail Stadium
- List of football stadiums in Bangladesh
- List of cricket grounds in Bangladesh
- Sheikh Kamal International Stadium, Gopalganj
