= Sohel Rana (footballer, born 1995) =

Bangladeshi footballer

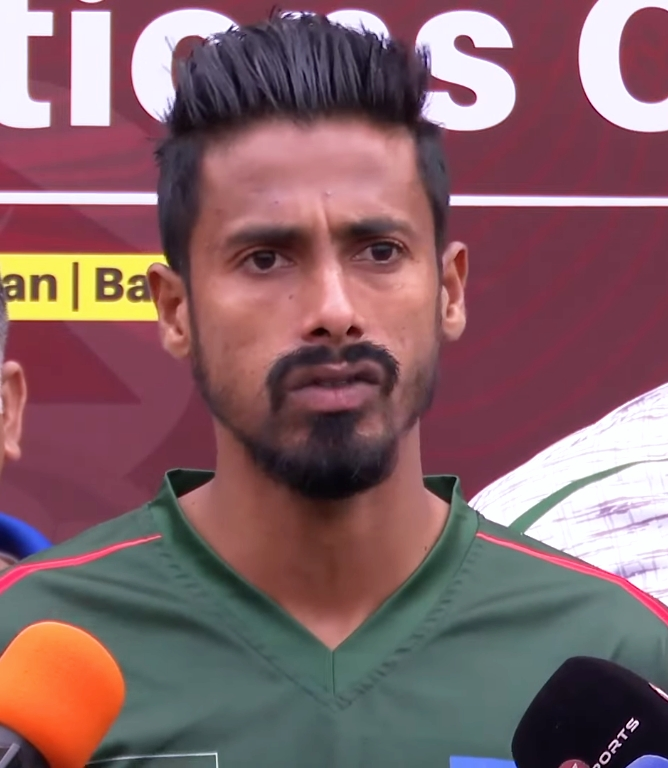
- Sohel with Bangladesh in 2021

Personal information
- Full name: Sohel Rana
- Date of birth: 27 March 1995 (age 31)
- Place of birth: Arambagh, Dhaka, Bangladesh
- Height: 1.73 m (5 ft 8 in)
- Position: Centre midfielder

Team information
- Current team: Bashundhara Kings
- Number: 17

Youth career
- 2007–08: Mohammedan
- –2010: Victoria

Senior career*
Years	Team	Apps	(Gls)
2010–13	Mohammedan		
2013–15	Sheikh Jamal		
2015–17	Sheikh Russel		
2017–21	Dhaka Abahani	59	(2)
2021–	Bashundhara Kings	80	(2)

International career^{‡}
2009	Bangladesh U16	4	(1)
2011	Bangladesh U19	4	(0)
2012–16	Bangladesh U23	16	(3)
2013–	Bangladesh	83	(1)
Medal record
Representing Bangladesh
South Asian Games
Bronze medal – third place	2016
- * Club domestic league appearances and goals as of 23 May 2026 ‡ National team caps and goals as of 1 October 2026

Sohel Rana (Bengali: সোহেল রানা; born 27 March 1995) is a Bangladeshi professional footballer who plays as a midfielder for Bangladesh Premier League club Bashundhara Kings and the Bangladesh national team.

== Club career ==
Sohel made his professional league debut with Mohammedan SC in 2010. He made his mark for the team during the Federation Cup by scoring in a 1–1 draw with Feni SC, as Mohammedan failed to reach the semi-finals for the first time in the 30-year history of the tournament.

In August 2019, Sohel's goal for Abahani Limited Dhaka against North Korea's 25 April during the 2019 AFC Cup was voted as the "AFC Cup 2019 Goal of the Week".

== International career ==
=== Youth team ===
Sohel made his youth international debut during the 2010 AFC U-16 Championship qualifiers. He represented Bangladesh U19 during the 2012 AFC U-19 Championship qualifiers held in Dhaka.

Sohel made his debut for Bangladesh U-23 in a friendly with Nepal U-23, played at Bangladesh Army Stadium, Bangladesh on 25 August 2014. On his debut, he scored the match-winning goal in the 14th minute of the 2nd half by an angular ground shot from outside the danger zone in a rain soaked heavy ground (1–0).

He first wore the U23 arm band against Syria in 2016 AFC U-23 Championship Qualifier at home, but he was the makeshift captain as Raihan Hasan received red card that night. He fully captained the Olympic side in the very next match against India which end goalless.

=== Senior team ===
Sohel made his senior debut for Bangladesh in a 2014 AFC Challenge Cup qualification match against Palestine, played at Dasarath Rangasala Stadium, Nepal on 2 March 2013.

== Career statistics ==
=== International ===
As of 1 October 2026.

Bangladesh
Year	Apps	Goals
2013	4	0
2014	3	0
2015	10	0
2016	5	0
2018	3	0
2019	7	0
2020	6	0
2021	7	0
2022	6	0
2023	13	0
2024	7	0
2025	7	1
2026	5	0
Total	83	1

Scores and results list Bangladesh goal tally first, score column indicates score after each Sohel Rana goal

List of youth international goals scored by Sohel Rana
No.	Date	Venue	Opponent	Score	Result	Competition
1.	11 October 2009	Panaad Stadium, Bacolod	Chinese Taipei	1–1	1–2	2010 AFC U-16 Championship qualification
2.	24 June 2012	Dasarath Rangasala Stadium, Kathmandu	Yemen	1–4	1–5	2013 AFC U-22 Championship qualification
3.	25 August 2014	Bangladesh Army Stadium, Dhaka	Nepal	1–0	1–0	International Friendly
4.	15 February 2016	Indira Gandhi Athletic Stadium, Sarusajai	Maldives	1–0	2 (5)–(4) 2	2016 South Asian Games

Scores and results list Bangladesh goal tally first, score column indicates score after each Sohel Rana goal

List of international goals scored by Sohel Rana
No.	Date	Venue	Opponent	Score	Result	Competition
1	4 June 2025	National Stadium, Dhaka, Bangladesh	Bhutan	2–0	2–0	Friendly

== Personal life ==
"She used to send me a lot of messages. But it seemed like a 'fake account' to me! But I got to know her in the end after a lot of messages came. I first met her at a restaurant in Dhanmondi. I liked her at the first day."

— Sohel Rana talking about how he met Tamila

On 7 March 2021, Sohel Rana married Syed Tamila Sirajee, an MBA student, after their six years long relationship. On 8 February 2015, Tamila came to Bangabandhu Stadium to watch 2015 Bangabandhu Gold Cup final match where she saw and fall in love with Sohel. After that, she reached out Sohel through social media site Facebook. At first, they became friends and then lovers.

Sohel Rana is the uncle of Pappu Hossain and Sujon Hossain, both goalkeepers in the Bangladesh Premier League. On 17 September 2019, Pappu got his call-up to the Bangladesh national team along with regular member Sohel. It made headlines as uncle and nephew both were going to play for the national team together.

== Honours ==
Mohammedan SC

- Super Cup: 2013

Sheikh Jamal Dhanmondi Club

- Bangladesh Premier League: 2013–14, 2015
- Federation Cup: 2013–14, 2014–15
- King's Cup: 2014

Abahani Limited Dhaka

- Bangladesh Premier League: 2017–18
- Federation Cup: 2018

Bashundhara Kings

- Bangladesh Premier League: 2021–22, 2022–23, 2023–24
