= Manik Hossain Molla =

Bangladeshi footballer

Manik Molla
Personal information
- Full name: Manik Hossain Molla
- Date of birth: 11 March 1999 (age 27)
- Place of birth: Rajshahi, Bangladesh
- Height: 1.82 m (6 ft 0 in)
- Position: Defensive midfielder

Team information
- Current team: Bangladesh Police
- Number: 14

Senior career*
| Years | Team | Apps | (Gls) |
| 2017–2018 | Fakirerpool | | |
| 2018–2019 | Arambagh | 24 | (0) |
| 2019–2021 | Chittagong Abahani | 22 | (1) |
| 2021–2022 | Sheikh Russel | 18 | (2) |
| 2022–2024 | Mohammedan | 22 | (1) |
| 2024– | Bangladesh Police | 30 | (2) |

International career^{‡}
| 2021–2026 | Bangladesh U23 | 6 (Note: Appearances as an overage player (One appearance in 2026 Diamond Jubilee International Football Tournament)) | (0) |
| 2020–2021 | Bangladesh | 9 | (0) |
- * Club domestic league appearances and goals as of 1 June 2026 ‡ National team caps and goals as of 8 June 2026

Manik Hossain Molla (Bengali: মানিক হোসেন মোল্লা), simply known as Manik Molla, is a Bangladeshi professional footballer who plays as a midfielder for Bangladesh Football League club Bangladesh Police, which he captains.

Manik started his senior professional career playing for Fakirerpool in the Bangladesh Championship League.

== Career statistics ==
=== International ===
As of 15 June 2021

Appearances and goals by national team, year and competition
| Team | Year | Competitive | | Friendly | | Total | |
| Team | Year | Apps | Goals | Apps | Goals | Apps | Goals |
|---|---|---|---|---|---|---|---|
| Bangladesh | 2020 | 0 | 0 | 4 (Note: Appearance(s) in FIFA recognized Friendlies and Invitational tournaments) | 0 | 4 | 0 |
| Bangladesh | 2021 | 3 (Note: Appearance(s) in FIFA World Cup qualification) | 0 | 2 | 0 | 5 | 0 |
| Career total | | 3 | 0 | 6 | 0 | 9 | 0 |

== Honours ==
Mohammedan SC

- Federation Cup: 2022–23
