= 2022–23 Chittagong Abahani season =

Chittagong Abahani 2022–23 football season

Chittagong Abahani
2022–23 season
- President: M. Abdul Latif
- Head coach: Saiful Bari Titu (until 12 February); Mahbubul Haque Jewel (interim, from 12 February to 5 April; head coach since 5 April until end of the season)
- Stadium: Bir Sreshtho Fl. Lt. Matiur Rahman Stadium
- Bangladesh Premier League: 8th
- Federation Cup: Quarter final
- Independence Cup: Quarter final
- Top goalscorer: League: Ojukwu David Ifegwu (10); All: Ojukwu David Ifegwu (13)
- Biggest win: 0–4 v Fakirerpool YMC (Neutral); 18 November 2022 (Independence Cup)
- Biggest defeat: 5–1 v Dhaka Abahani (Away); 13 January 2023 (Premier League)

The 2022–23 season was the Chittagong Abahani's 43rd season since its establishment in 1980 and their 13th season in the Bangladesh Premier League. This also remarks their 9th consecutive season in the top flight after getting promoted in 2014. In addition to domestic league, Ctg Abahani also participated on this season's edition of Federation Cup and Independence Cup. The season covered the period from October 2022 to July 2023.

This season marked the return of head coach Saiful Bari Titu for his second spell replacing Maruful Haque, who departed to Sheikh Jamal DC after letting his contract expire. This season was the first since 2014–2015 season without Koushik Barua, one of the longest serving player of the club's history, as he departed to join Sheikh Jamal DC.

== Players ==
Players statistics and squad numbers last updated on 22 July 2023. Appearances include all competitions and official matches.
Note: Flags indicate national team as has been defined under FIFA eligibility rules. Players may hold more than one non-FIFA nationality.

No.	Player	Nat.	Position(s)	Date Of birth (age)	Year signed	Previous club	Apps.	Goals
Goalkeepers
1	Pappu Hossain	(Bangladesh)	GK	7 April 1999 (aged 24)	2022	Saif Sporting Club	17	0
22	Nayeem Mia	(Bangladesh)	GK	21 December 1998 (aged 24)	2021	Abahani Ltd. Dhaka	17	0
30	Showkat Hossen Hasan	(Bangladesh)	GK	3 January 1999 (aged 24)	2021	Fortis FC	0	0
40	Mohammed Shahidullah	(Bangladesh)	GK	6 April 2001 (aged 22)	2023	Free agent	0	0
Defenders
3	Shukurali Pulatov (Captain)	(Uzbekistan)	CB	23 February 1990 (aged 33)	2022	(Maldives) Club Green Streets	48	1
4	Soeb Mia (vice-captain)	(Bangladesh)	RB/LB	3 January 1992 (aged 31)	2021	Muktijoddha Sangsad KC	35	0
5	Nasiruddin Chowdhury	(Bangladesh)	CB	9 October 1979 (aged 43)	2022	Sheikh Russel KC	22 (since 2022)	1 (since 2022)
13	Md. Tarek	(Bangladesh)	CB/RB/LB	16 June 1993 (aged 30)	2022	Rahmatganj MFS	19	1
14	Kazi Rahad Mia	(Bangladesh)	CB/RB	15 July 2003 (aged 20)	2022	Arambagh KS	8	0
15	Apu Ahamed (vice-captain)	(Bangladesh)	CB/RB	30 April 1992 (aged 31)	2019	Agrani Bank Ltd. SC	28	0
23	Md. Rockey	(Bangladesh)	RB	14 October 1998 (aged 24)	2022	Police FC	29	0
26	Ashik Ahammed	(Bangladesh)	LB	26 October 1994 (aged 28)	2023	AFC Uttara	3	0
28	Md Alauddin	(Bangladesh)	RB/LB	1 August 1994 (aged 28)	2023	Fortis FC	0	0
44	Rostam Islam Dukhu Mia	(Bangladesh)	CB	13 December 2005 (aged 17)	2022	Sheikh Russel KC	11	0
Midfielders
6	Arafat Hossen	(Bangladesh)	DM	7 May 1995 (aged 28)	2021	Rahmatganj MFS	41	0
7	Anik Hossain	(Bangladesh)	CM/DM	3 August 1998 (aged 24)	2022	Mohammedan SC	33	1
8	Saker Ullah	(Bangladesh)	DM/CM	18 October 1995 (aged 27)	2019	NoFeL SC	36	0
17	Imran Hassan Remon	(Bangladesh)	DM	15 August 1992 (aged 30)	2022	Saif Sporting Club	17	0
21	Farhad Mia	(Bangladesh)	CM	24 July 2002 (aged 20)	2022	Mohammedan SC	21	1
24	Md Al Imran	(Bangladesh)	CM	10 October 1994 (aged 28)	2023	Agrani Bank Ltd. SC	2	0
70	Rumon Hossain	(Bangladesh)	RM/LM	13 January 1995 (aged 28)	2022	Uttar Baridhara Club	15	0
98	Mostafa Kahraba	(Egypt)	AM	10 November 1987 (aged 35)	2023	(India) Ageya Chalo Sangha FC	11	1
Forwards
10	Candy Augustine	(Nigeria)	RW/LW	22 December 1996 (aged 26)	2022	(Northern Cyprus) Mesarya SK	24	5
11	Jamir Uddin	(Bangladesh)	LW	12 December 2002 (aged 20)	2022	Saif Sporting Club	21	1
12	Rasel Ahmed	(Bangladesh)	RW/LW	21 March 2003 (aged 20)	2022	Swadhinata KS	2	0
16	Md Nahian	(Bangladesh)	LW/RW	30 May 2003 (aged 20)	2022	Gopalganj SC	6	1
19	Ojukwu David Ifegwu	(Nigeria)	CF	1 June 1996 (aged 27)	2022	(Nigeria) Remo Stars F.C.	26	13
20	Saief Shamsud	(Bangladesh)	CF	31 August 1999 (aged 23)	2022	Swadhinata KS	2	0
77	Ekbal Hossain	(Bangladesh)	LW/ LM/ RW	14 August 1995 (aged 27)	2022	Swadhinata KS	19	5
99	Emtiyaz Raihan	(Bangladesh)	CF/RW	27 August 1997 (aged 25)	2022	Agrani Bank SC	18	2
Left during the season
2	Kamrul Islam (vice-captain)	(Bangladesh)	LB/CB	25 December 1998 (aged 24)	2021	Mohammedan SC	25	1
9	Sajidur Rahman Sajid	(Bangladesh)	LW/RW	19 February 1993 (aged 30)	2022	NoFeL SC	4	0
25	SK Saiful Islam	(Bangladesh)	GK	3 March 1992 (aged 31)	2021	Saif Sporting Club	19	0
91	Yacouba Bamba	(Ivory Coast)	AM	30 November 1991 (aged 31)	2022	(Jordan) Al-Faisaly SC	9	5

Nasiruddin Chowdhury played for the club during 2016-17 period. But accurate data of appearances and goals from that season haven't been found.

== Transfers ==
=== Transfers in ===
No.	Position	Player	Previous club	Fee	Date	Ref.
19	FW	(Nigeria) Ojukwu David Ifegwu	(Nigeria) Remo Stars F.C.	Free	23 October 2022	
91	MF	(Ivory Coast) Yacouba Bamba	(Jordan) Al-Faisaly SC	Free	25 October 2022	
14	DF	Kazi Rahad Mia	Arambagh KS	Free	25 October 2022	
12	FW	Rasel Ahmed	Swadhinata KS	Free	26 October 2022	
7	MF	Anik Hossain	Mohammedan SC	Free	26 October 2022	
1	GK	Pappu Hossain	Saif SC	Free	27 October 2022	
77	FW	Ekbal Hussain	Swadhinata KS	Free	27 October 2022	
21	MF	Farhad Mona	Mohammedan SC	Free	28 October 2022	
11	FW	Jamir Uddin	Saif Sporting Club	Free	29 October 2022	
44	DF	Rostam Islam Dukhu Mia	Sheikh Russel KC	Free	29 October 2022	
16	FW	Md Nahian	Gopalganj SC	Free	31 October 2022	
20	FW	Saief Shamsud	Swadhinata KS	Free	2 November 2022	
5	DF	Nasiruddin Chowdhury	Sheikh Russel KC	Free	2 November 2022	
3	DF	(Uzbekistan) Shukurali Pulatov	(Maldives) Club Green Streets	Free	5 November 2022	
13	DF	Md. Tarek	Rahmatganj MFS	Free	November 2022	
23	DF	Md. Rockey	Police FC	Free	November 2022	
17	MF	Imran Hassan Remon	Saif Sporting Club	Free	November 2022	
70	MF	Rumon Hossain	Uttar Baridhara	Free	November 2022	
9	FW	Sajidur Rahman Sajid	NoFeL SC	Free	November 2022	
99	FW	Emtiyaz Raihan	Agrani Bank SC	Free	November 2022	
98	MF	(Egypt) Mostafa Kahraba	(India) Ageya Chalo Sangha	Free	March 2023	
26	DF	Ashik Ahammed	AFC Uttara	Free	March 2023	
24	MF	Md Al Imran	Agrani Bank Ltd. SC	Free	March 2023	
28	DF	Md Alauddin	Fortis FC	Free	March 2023	
40	GK	Mohammed Shahidullah	Free agent	Free	March 2023	

=== Transfers out ===
No.	Position	Player	Moved To	Fee	Date	Ref.
10	MF	Shohel Rana	Dhaka Abahani	Free	5 August 2022	
23	DF	Monir Alam	Sheikh Russel KC	Free	16 August 2022	
5	DF	Jalal Mia	Rahmatganj MFS	Free	22 August 2022	
14	MF	Md Munna	Rahmatganj MFS	Free	22 August 2022	
28	DF	Amit Hasan	Muktijoddha SKC	Free	22 August 2022	
26	DF	(Nigeria) Kehinde Yisa	Free agent	Free	4 September 2022	
19	MF	(Afghanistan) Omid Popalzay	Free agent	Free	4 September 2022	
27	FW	(Nigeria) Peter Ebimobowei	Free agent	Free	4 September 2022	
9	FW	Shakhawat Rony	Fortis FC	Free	September 2022	
1	GK	Azad Hossain	Fortis FC	Free	September 2022	
44	DF	Habibur Rahman Nolok	Rahmatganj MFS	Free	23 October 2022	
55	DF	Nazim Uddin Mithu	Muktijoddha SKC	Free	27 October 2022	
16	DF	Sakib Sultan Rafu	Free agent	Free	October 2022	
31	GK	Emon Hawladar	Free agent	Free	October 2022	
99	FW	Masum Mia	AFC Uttara	Free	October 2022	
13	DF	Shakil Ahad Topu	Uttara FC	Free	October 2022	
12	MF	Koushik Barua	Sheikh Jamal DC	Free	October 2022	
3	DF	Shawkat Russel	Sheikh Russel KC	Free	October 2022	
18	MF	Robiul Hasan	Police FC	Free	October 2022	
21	MF	Rasedul Islam	Free agent	Free	October 2022	
7	FW	Zahid Hossain	Free agent	Free	October 2022	
11	FW	Rubel Mia	Muktijoddha SKC	Free	October 2022	
17	FW	Arifur Rahman	Free agent	Free	October 2022	
24	FW	Toriqul Islam Julfikar	Free agent	Free	October 2022	
91	MF	(Ivory Coast) Yacouba Bamba	Free agent	Free	14 February 2023	
25	GK	Sk Saiful Islam	Bashundhara Kings	Free	March 2023	
2	DF	Kamrul Islam	Mohammedan SC	Free	March 2023	
9	FW	Sajidur Rahman Sajid	Free agent	Free	March 2023	

== Pre-season and friendlies ==
Win Draw Loss Fixtures

30 March 2023 Friendly	Dhaka Abahani	4–0	Chittagong Abahani	Dhanmondi, Dhaka
	Emeka; A. Bablu; Papon	Report		Stadium: Abahani Club Field

== Competitions ==
=== Overall record ===
Competition	First match	Last match	Starting round	Final position	Record							
Competition	First match	Last match	Starting round	Final position	Pld	W	D	L	GF	GA	GD	Win %
Premier League	23 December 2022	22 July 2023	Matchday 1	8th	20	4	9	7	26	35	−9	20.00
Independence Cup	14 November 2022	26 November 2022	Group Stage	Quarter-final	4	2	0	2	6	4	+2	50.00
Federation Cup	27 December 2022	18 April 2023	Group Stage	Quarter-final	4	1	1	2	2	6	−4	25.00
Total					28	7	10	11	34	45	−11	25.00

Source: Soccerway

=== Independence Cup ===
==== Group stage ====
The draw for the group stage was held on 31 October 2022.

Pos	Team	Pld	W	D	L	GF	GA	GD	Pts	Qualification
1	Bashundhara Kings (C)	3	3	0	0	19	0	+19	9	Advance to Knockout stage
2	Chittagong Abahani	3	2	0	1	6	3	+3	6	Advance to Knockout stage
3	Fakirerpool YMC	3	1	0	2	3	19	−16	3	
4	AFC Uttara	3	0	0	3	2	8	−6	0	

Source: GSA
(C) Champions

14 November 2022 1	Chittagong Abahani	2–1	AFC Uttara	Gopalganj
14:00 BST (UTC+6)	Y. Bamba 16'; Nasiruddin (yellow card) 42'; D. Ifegwu 76'; Pulatov (yellow card) 90+3'	Report	Jayed Ahmed (yellow card) 28'; Naim Uddin 73'	Stadium: Sheikh Fazlul Haque Mani Stadium; Referee: G.M. Chowdhury Noyon

18 November 2022 2	Fakirerpool YMC	0–4	Chittagong Abahani	Munshigonj
14:00 BST (UTC+6)		Report	Jamir Uddin 8'; Y. Bamba 18' (pen.), 71'; Imran Remon (yellow card) 56'; Rumon Hossain (yellow card) 84'; D. Ifegwu 90+2' (pen.)	Stadium: Bir Fl. Lt. Matiur Rahman Stadium; Referee: Mizanur Rahman

22 November 2022 3	Bashundhara Kings	2–0	Chittagong Abahani	Munshigonj
13:00 BST (UTC+6)	Miguel 75'; Rakib 77'	Report		Stadium: Bir Fl. Lt. Matiur Rahman Stadium

==== Knockout phase ====
===== Quarter-final =====
26 November 2022	Sheikh Russel KC	1–0	Chittagong Abahani	Gopalganj
13:00 BST (UTC+6)	M. Udoh 85'	Report		Stadium: Sheikh Fazlul Haque Mani Stadium

=== Federation Cup ===
==== Group stage ====
The draw for the group stage was held on 25 November 2022.

Pos	Team	Pld	W	D	L	GF	GA	GD	Pts	Qualification
1	Bashundhara Kings	3	3	0	0	8	3	+5	9	Advance to knockout phase
2	Chittagong Abahani	3	1	1	1	1	2	−1	4	Advance to knockout phase
3	Muktijoddha Sangsad KC	3	1	0	2	5	6	−1	3	Advance to knockout phase
4	Fortis FC	3	0	1	2	1	4	−3	1	

Source: Footystats
Rules for classification: Group stage tiebreakers

27 December 2022 1	Chittagong Abahani	1–0	Muktijoddha SKC	Gopalganj
14:30 BST (UTC+6)	D. Ifegwu 90'	Report	Rashedul Islam (yellow card) 44'; Kasto (yellow card) 49'	Stadium: Sheikh Fazlul Haque Mani Stadium; Referee: Bhubon M. Torofder

17 January 2023 2	Fortis FC	0–0	Chittagong Abahani	Munshigonj
15:00 BST (UTC+6)	Sajon Mia (yellow card) 26'	Report	Imran Remon (yellow card) 29'	Stadium: Bir Sreshtho Fl. Lt. Matiur Rahman Stadium; Referee: Jalal Uddin

7 February 2022 3	Bashundhara Kings	2–0	Chittagong Abahani	Cumilla
15:15 BST (UTC+6)	A. Fahad (yellow card) 8'; Topu 40'; Miguel 55' (pen.); S. Reza (red card) 86'; S. Morsalin (yellow card) 89'	Report	S. Ullah (yellow card) 57'; M. Tarek (red card) 86'	Stadium: Shaheed Dhirendranath Datta Stadium; Referee: Bhubon M. Torofder

==== Knockout phase ====
===== Quarter-final =====
18 April 2023	Dhaka Mohammedan	4-1	Chittagong Abahani	Cumilla
15:15 BST (UTC+6)	S. Emmanuel 20'; M. Muzaffarov 35'; H. Murad (yellow card) 38'; S. Diabate 48', 70'	Report	D. Ifegwu (yellow card) 5'; C. Augustine 77' (pen.)	Stadium: Shaheed Dhirendranath Datta Stadium; Referee: Md Alamgir Sarkar

=== Premier League ===
==== League table ====
Pos	Team	Pld	W	D	L	GF	GA	GD	Pts	Qualification or relegation
6	Sheikh Jamal DC	20	5	9	6	25	32	−7	24	
7	Fortis FC	20	5	8	7	23	25	−2	23	
8	Chittagong Abahani	20	4	9	7	26	35	−9	21	
9	Rahmatganj MFS	20	4	7	9	15	31	−16	19	
10	Muktijoddha Sangsad KC (R)	20	4	3	13	19	42	−23	15	Relegation to Championship League

Source: Soccerway
Rules for classification: 1) Points; 2) Goal difference; 3) Goals scored.
(R) Relegated

==== Results summary ====
Overall								Home						Away					
Pld	W	D	L	GF	GA	GD	Pts	W	D	L	GF	GA	GD	W	D	L	GF	GA	GD
20	4	9	7	26	35	−9	21	3	3	4	14	17	−3	1	6	3	12	18	−6

Source: Soccerway

==== Results by round ====
Round	1	2	3	4	5	6	7	8	9	10	11	12	13	14	15	16	17	18	19	20	21	22
Ground	(Note: No Chittagong Abahani matchday in this round.)	H	A	H	A	H	A	H	A	H	A	(Note: No Chittagong Abahani matchday in this round.)	A	H	A	H	A	H	A	H	A	H
Result	-	L	D	D	L	L	D	D	L	W	D	-	D	L	D	W	L	W	D	D	W	L
Position	8	9	8	9	10	10	10	10	10	10	10	10	10	10	10	10	10	9	8	8	7	8

Source: Matches
A = Away; H = Home; W = Win; D = Draw; L = Loss; P = Postponed
Notes: Positions show the situation at the end of the corresponding Rounds, not the position at the conclusion of matches or game days.

==== Matches ====
23 December 2022 2	Chittagong Abahani	2-4	Sheikh Russel KC	Munshigonj
14:30 BST (UTC+6)	Y. Bamba 64' (pen.); Jamir (yellow card) 73'; Nasir 74'	Report	Ibrahim (yellow card) 34'; Didier 41', 84'; Yeasin 52'; Udoh 90+4'	Stadium: Bir Sreshtho Fl. Lt. Matiur Rahman Stadium; Referee: Anisur Rahman

31 December 2022 3	Dhaka Mohammedan	2-2	Chittagong Abahani	Cumilla
14:30 BST (UTC+6)	Rajib (yellow card) 9'; Diabate 31', (yellow card) 52'; Manik 59'; Muzaffarov (yellow card) 81'	Report	Pappu (red card) 12'; D. Ifegwu 29'; Pulatov (yellow card) 43'; Y. Bamba 45+3', (yellow card) 90'; Candy (yellow card) 85'	Stadium: Shaheed Dhirendranath Datta Stadium; Referee: Bituraj Barua

6 January 2023 4	Chittagong Abahani	1-1	Sheikh Jamal DC	Munshigonj
14:45 BST (UTC+6)	D. Ifegwu 53'; Kamrul (yellow card) 60'; Pulatov (yellow card) 73'; Candy (yellow card) 73'; Nasir (yellow card) 85'	Report	Otabek (yellow card) 70'; Stewart 76' (pen.)	Stadium: Bir Sreshtho Fl. Lt. Matiur Rahman Stadium; Referee: Anisur Rahman

13 January 2023 5	Dhaka Abahani	5-1	Chittagong Abahani	Cumilla
14:45 BST (UTC+6)	Kingsley 11', 79'; A. Molla (yellow card) 58'; Royal 72'; Colindres 81'; Jibon 90'	Report	D. Ifegwu 32'	Stadium: Shaheed Dhirendranath Datta Stadium; Referee: Mizanur Rahman

21 January 2023 6	Chittagong Abahani	0-3	Bashundhara Kings	Munshigonj
15:00 BST (UTC+6)	Saker Ullah (yellow card) 49'; D. Ifegwu (yellow card) 58'	Report	Rakib 4'; Dorielton 11'; Robinho (yellow card) 49'; Saad (yellow card) 50'; Y. Arafat 71'	Stadium: Bir Sreshtho Fl. Lt. Matiur Rahman Stadium; Referee: Jalal Uddin

27 January 2023 7	AFC Uttara	1-1	Chittagong Abahani	Mymensingh
15:00 BST (UTC+6)	S. Momunov 7' (pen.); Rayhan (yellow card) 20'; S. Bepari (yellow card) 37'; M. Razib (yellow card) 43'; M. Ganto (yellow card) 90+2'	Report	D. Ifegwu 58' (pen.), (yellow card) 90+4'; Jamir (yellow card) 76'	Stadium: Rafiq Uddin Bhuiyan Stadium; Referee: Sowmik Paul

3 February 2023 8	Chittagong Abahani	0–0	Fortis FC	Munshiganj
15:15 BST (UTC+6)	E. Raihan (yellow card) 33'; Md. Rokey (yellow card) 60'; Pulatov (yellow card) 90'	Report	Md. Sabuz (yellow card) 85'	Stadium: Bir Sreshtho Fl. Lt. Matiur Rahman Stadium; Referee: Zamal Farouqee Nahid

11 February 2023 9	Rahmatganj MFS	1–0	Chittagong Abahani	Munshigonj
15:15 BST (UTC+6)	M. Mitul (yellow card) 15'; J. Hinestroza (yellow card) 29'; H. Nolok (yellow card) 47'; M. Enamul 78'	Report	Nasir Udiin (yellow card) 39'; M. Tarek (yellow card) 49'	Stadium: Bir Sreshtho Fl. Lt. Matiur Rahman Stadium; Referee: Zamal Farouqee Nahid

18 February 2023 10	Chittagong Abahani	2–0	Muktijoddha SKC	Munshigonj
15:15 BST (UTC+6)	S. Pulatov 33'; E. Raihan (yellow card) 54', (goal) 67'	Report	R. Rashed (yellow card) 45+2'; S. Otani (yellow card) 50'; A. Najeem (yellow card) 86'	Stadium: Bir Sreshtho Fl. Lt. Matiur Rahman Stadium; Referee: Saymon Hassan

25 February 2023 11	Police FC	1-1	Chittagong Abahani	Mymensingh
15:15 BST (UTC+6)	A. Malikov 4' (pen.); Joyonto (yellow card) 42'; E. Morillo (yellow card) 48'	Report	E. Raihan (yellow card) 13'; M. Rockey (yellow card) 18'; D. Ifegwu 43'; C. Augustine (yellow card) 90+4'	Stadium: Rafiq Uddin Bhuiyan Stadium; Referee: Jasim Akhter

14 April 2023 13	Sheikh Russel KC	2–2	Chittagong Abahani	Dhaka
15:15 BST (UTC+6)	A. Marveggio (yellow card) 11'; F. Shitol 32'; M. Udoh 62'; T. Talipov (yellow card) 67'	Report	Ekbal 2', (yellow card) 5'; M. Kahraba (yellow card) 19'; Farhad 81'	Stadium: Bashundhara Sports Complex; Referee: Mohamed Mizanur Rahman

29 April 2023 14	Chittagong Abahani	1-2	Dhaka Mohammedan	Munshigonj
15:45 BST (UTC+6)	Rockey (yellow card) 22'; D. Ifegwu (yellow card) 30'; Anik (yellow card) 57'; M. Kahraba (yellow card) 62'; M. Tarek 81'	Report	Rajib (yellow card) 33'; S. Diabate 60' (pen.), 73'; H. Murad (yellow card) 85'	Stadium: Bir Sreshtho Fl. Lt. Matiur Rahman Stadium; Referee: Mahmud Zamal Farouqee Nahid

5 May 2023 15	Sheikh Jamal DC	2–2	Chittagong Abahani	Gopalganj
16:00 BST (UTC+6)	A. Shaeid (yellow card) 15'; S. Sillah 51', (yellow card) 90+2'; N. Mavlonov (yellow card) 55' (yellow-red card) 80'; C. Stewart 90+4'	Report	Nasiruddin (yellow card) 18'; M. Kahraba 50'; M. Tarek (yellow card) 55'; Ekbal 85'	Stadium: Sheikh Fazlul Haque Mani Stadium; Referee: Mohammed Jalal Uddin

12 May 2023 16	Chittagong Abahani	3–2	Dhaka Abahani	Munshigonj
16:00 BST (UTC+6)	D. Ifegwu 7', 40'; Ekbal 40'; I. Remon (yellow card) 85'; M. Nayeem (yellow card) 89'	Report	Y. Mohammad 18', 64'; Papon (yellow card) 52'; R. Karim (yellow card) 69'	Stadium: Bir Sreshtho Fl. Lt. Matiur Rahman Stadium; Referee: Mohammed Jalal Uddin

19 May 2023 17	Bashundhara Kings	2–0	Chittagong Abahani	Dhaka
16:00 BST (UTC+6)	T. Kazi (yellow card) 12'; M. Figueira 18' (pen.), (yellow card) 30'; S. Rana (yellow card) 45+4'; Dori 51'; Robinho (penalty missed) 61'	Report	Ekbal (yellow card) 13'; Farhad (yellow card) 17' (yellow-red card) 18'; D. Ifegwu (yellow card) 55'; M. Rockey (yellow card) 73'	Stadium: Bashundhara Sports Complex; Referee: Symoon Sany

26 May 2023 18	Chittagong Abahani	1–0	AFC Uttara	Munshigonj
16:00 BST (UTC+6)	E. Raihan 86'	Report		Stadium: Bir Sreshtho Fl. Lt. Matiur Rahman Stadium; Referee: Jalal Uddin

3 June 2023 19	Fortis FC	1–1	Chittagong Abahani	Rajshahi
16:00 BST (UTC+6)	Didarul (yellow card) 59'; S. Rony 65'; Ariful (yellow card) 87'; M. Jony (yellow card) 88'	Report	S. Pulatov (yellow card) 69'; Ekbal 90+1'	Stadium: Muktijuddho Sriti Stadium; Referee: Sabuj Das

8 July 2023 20	Chittagong Abahani	2–2	Rahmatganj MFS	Munshigonj
16:00 BST (UTC+6)	Ekbal 63'; D. Ifegwu 65'; M. Tarek (yellow card) 71'	Report	P, Ebimobowei 56'; K. Ashraful 84'	Stadium: Bir Sreshtho Fl. Lt. Matiur Rahman Stadium; Referee: Anisur Rahman

15 July 2023 21	Muktijoddha SKC	1–2	Chittagong Abahani	Gopalganj
16:00 BST (UTC+6)	E. Uzochukwu 29'; R. Rashed (yellow card) 30'; A. Bokor (yellow card) 51'; A. Sajib (yellow card) 74'; J. Dzingai (yellow card) 75'	Report	D. Ifegwu 1'; Anik 11'; M. Tarek (red card) 25'; Ekbal (yellow card) 56'; N. Uddin (yellow card) 90+5'	Stadium: Sheikh Fazlul Haque Mani Stadium; Referee: Mizanur Rahman

22 July 2023 22	Chittagong Abahani	2–3	Police FC	Munshigonj
16:00 BST (UTC+6)	I. Remon (yellow card) 37'; D. Ifegwu 74' (pen.); M. Nahian 90+4'	Report	M. Abdullah 9'; M. Palacios 19'; M. Robiul 28'; Akibur (yellow card) 53'; M. Mithu (yellow card) 76'; Joyonto (yellow card) 83'	Stadium: Bir Sreshtho Fl. Lt. Matiur Rahman Stadium; Referee: Bituraj Barua

== Statistics ==
=== Squad statistics ===
Includes all competitions.

No.	Pos	Nat	Player	Total		BPL		Independence Cup		Federation Cup	
No.	Pos	Nat	Player	Apps	Goals	Apps	Goals	Apps	Goals	Apps	Goals
1	GK	(Bangladesh)	Pappu Hossain	17	0	12	0	4	0	1	0
3	DF	(Uzbekistan)	Shukurali Pulatov	21	1	18	1	1	0	1+1	0
4	DF	(Bangladesh)	Soeb Mia	20	0	9+5	0	2+1	0	2+1	0
5	DF	(Bangladesh)	Nasiruddin Chowdhury	22	1	14+3	1	4	0	1	0
6	MF	(Bangladesh)	Arafat Hossen	21	0	12+3	0	4	0	1+1	0
7	MF	(Bangladesh)	Anik Hossain	24	1	12+5	1	2+2	0	2+1	0
8	MF	(Bangladesh)	Saker Ullah	6	0	2+1	0	0	0	2+1	0
10	FW	(Nigeria)	Candy Augustine	14	1	11	0	0	0	2+1	1
11	FW	(Bangladesh)	Jamir Uddin	21	1	8+7	0	4	1	2	0
12	FW	(Bangladesh)	Rasel Ahmed	2	0	0+1	0	0	0	0+1	0
13	DF	(Bangladesh)	Md Tarek	19	1	13+1	1	0+2	0	3	0
14	DF	(Bangladesh)	Kazi Rahad Mia	8	0	3+2	0	0+2	0	0+1	0
15	DF	(Bangladesh)	Apu Ahamed	11	0	5+1	0	3	0	2	0
16	FW	(Bangladesh)	Md Nahian	6	1	1+3	1	0	0	2	0
17	MF	(Bangladesh)	Imran Hassan Remon	17	0	2+9	0	4	0	2	0
19	FW	(Nigeria)	Ojukwu David Ifegwu	26	13	19	10	4	2	1+2	1
20	FW	(Bangladesh)	Saief Shamsud	2	0	0+1	0	0	0	1	0
21	MF	(Bangladesh)	Farhad Mia	21	1	12+3	1	0+4	0	2	0
22	GK	(Bangladesh)	Nayeem Mia	8	0	7	0	0	0	0+1	0
23	DF	(Bangladesh)	Md Rockey	22	0	15	0	4	0	3	0
24	MF	(Bangladesh)	Md Al Imran	2	0	0+1	0	0	0	0+1	0
26	DF	(Bangladesh)	Ashik Ahammed	2	0	1	0	0	0	0+1	0
28	DF	(Bangladesh)	Md Alauddin	0	0	0	0	0	0	0	0
30	GK	(Bangladesh)	Showkat Hossen Hasan	0	0	0	0	0	0	0	0
40	GK	(Bangladesh)	Mohammed Shahidullah	0	0	0	0	0	0	0	0
44	DF	(Bangladesh)	Rostam Islam Dukhu Mia	11	0	3+5	0	0	0	3	0
70	MF	(Bangladesh)	Rumon Hossain	15	0	6+5	0	0+2	0	2	0
77	FW	(Bangladesh)	Ekbal Hussain	19	5	11+2	5	2+2	0	0+2	0
98	MF	(Egypt)	Mostafa Kahraba	11	1	10	1	0	0	1	0
99	FW	(Bangladesh)	Emtiyaz Raihan	18	2	5+10	2	0	0	2+1	0
Players who left during the season
2	DF	(Bangladesh)	Kamrul Islam	9	0	4+1	0	2	0	2	0
9	FW	(Bangladesh)	Sajidur Rahman Sajid	4	0	0	0	0+3	0	0+1	0
25	GK	(Bangladesh)	SK Saiful Islam	5	0	1+1	0	0	0	3	0
91	MF	(Ivory Coast)	Yacouba Bamba	9	5	4	2	4	3	1	0

Source: Soccerway

Independence Cup: Rostam Islam Dukhu Mia and Emtiyaz Raihan played for their own services team Bangladesh Navy football team and Bangladesh Army football team respectively in Independence Cup.

=== Goalscorers ===
Rank	No.	Nat.	Pos.	Player	BPL	Independence Cup	Federation Cup	Total
1	19	(Nigeria)	FW	Ojukwu David Ifegwu	10	2	1	13
2	77	(Bangladesh)	FW	Ekbal Hussain	5	0	0	5
2	91	(Ivory Coast)	MF	Yacouba Bamba	2	3	0	5
4	99	(Bangladesh)	FW	Emtiyaz Raihan	2	0	0	2
5	3	(Uzbekistan)	DF	Shukurali Pulatov	1	0	0	1
5	5	(Bangladesh)	DF	Nasiruddin Chowdhury	1	0	0	1
5	7	(Bangladesh)	MF	Anik Hossain	1	0	0	1
5	10	(Nigeria)	FW	Candy Augustine	0	0	1	1
5	11	(Bangladesh)	FW	Jamir Uddin	0	1	0	1
5	13	(Bangladesh)	DF	Md Tarek	1	0	0	1
5	16	(Bangladesh)	FW	Md Nahian	1	0	0	1
5	21	(Bangladesh)	MF	Farhad Mia	1	0	0	1
5	98	(Egypt)	MF	Mostafa Kahraba	1	0	0	1
Own goals (from the opponents)					0	0	0	0
Total					26	6	2	34

=== Assists ===
Rank	No.	Pos.	Nat.	Player	BPL	Independence Cup	Federation Cup	Total
1	23	DF	(Bangladesh)	Md Rockey	2	1	0	3
2	10	FW	(Nigeria)	Candy Augustine	2	0	0	2
2	17	MF	(Bangladesh)	Imran Hassan Remon	1	1	0	2
2	19	FW	(Nigeria)	David Ifegwu	2	0	0	2
2	98	MF	(Egypt)	Mostafa Kahraba	2	0	0	2
6	4	DF	(Bangladesh)	Soeb Mia	1	0	0	1
6	6	MF	(Bangladesh)	Arafat Hossen	1	0	0	1
6	11	FW	(Bangladesh)	Jamir Uddin	1	0	0	1
6	13	DF	(Bangladesh)	Md Tarek	1	0	0	1
6	70	MF	(Bangladesh)	Rumon Hossain	1	0	0	1
6	91	MF	(Ivory Coast)	Yacouba Bamba	0	0	1	1
6	99	FW	(Bangladesh)	Emtiyaz Raihan	1	0	0	1
Total					15	2	1	18
