= 2023–24 Chittagong Abahani season =

Chittagong Abahani 2023–24 football season

Chittagong Abahani
2023–24 season
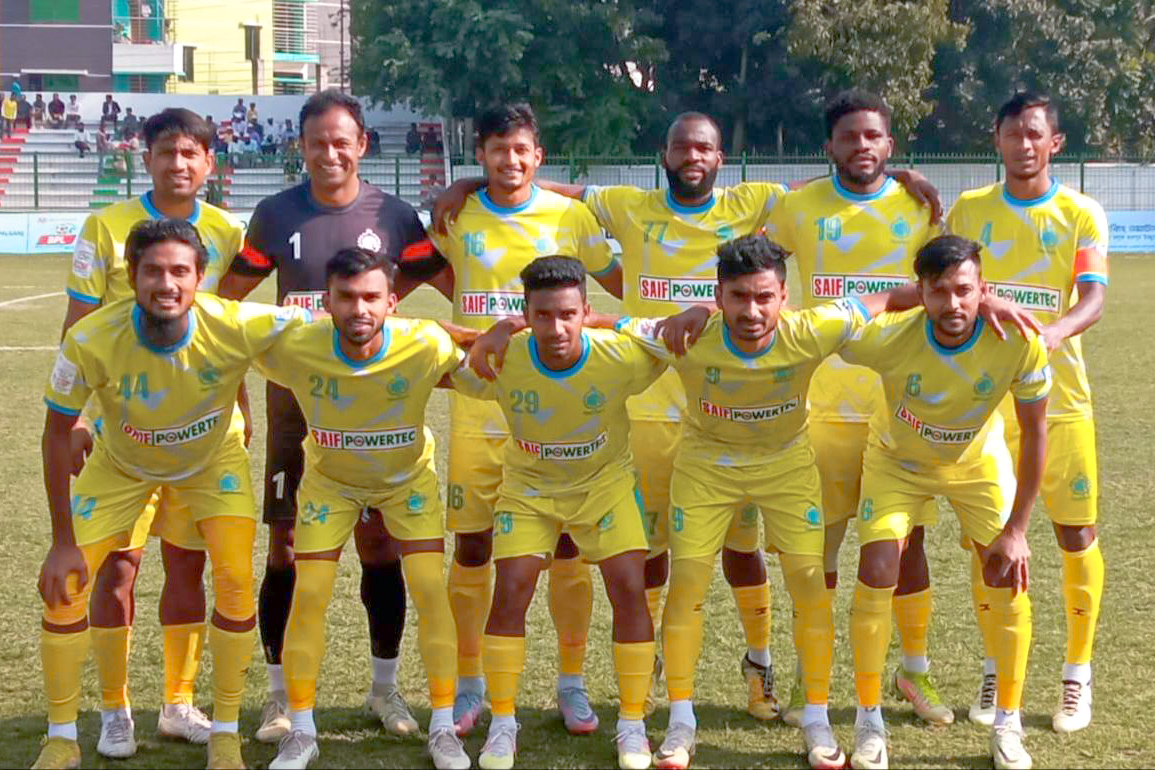
- Chittagong Abahani line up before facing Dhaka Abahani on 17 February, 2024
- President: M. Abdul Latif
- Head coach: Mahabubul Haque Juwel (until 25 March); Md. Tajuddin Taju (from 25 March)
- Stadium: Munshiganj Stadium
- Bangladesh Premier League: 5th
- Federation Cup: Group stage
- Independence Cup: Quarter-final
- Top goalscorer: League: David Ifegwu (5); All: David Ifegwu (5)
- Biggest win: 0–5 v Brothers Union (Away); 27 April 2024 (Premier League)
- Biggest defeat: 0–5 v Bashundhara Kings (Home); 5 April 2024 (Premier League)
- All statistics correct as of 17 May 2024.

The 2023–24 season is the Chittagong Abahani's 44th season since its establishment in 1980 and their 14th season in the Bangladesh Premier League. This also remarks their 10th consecutive season in the top flight after getting promoted in 2014. In addition to domestic league, Ctg Abahani participating in this season's edition of Federation Cup and Independence Cup. The season will cover the period from July 2023 to June 2024.

== Management team ==
Position	Name
Head coach	(Bangladesh) Md. Tajuddin Taju
Assistant coach	(Bangladesh) Arafat Ali Rony
Goalkeeping coach	(Bangladesh) Shakibul Hasan
Physiotherapist	(Bangladesh) Fuad Hasan Hawlader
Interpreter	(Bangladesh) Mohammad Poniruzzaman Ponir
Team manager	(Bangladesh) Arman Aziz
Technical Director	(Bangladesh) Maruful Haque

- Last updated: 5 April 2024

== Players ==
Players statistics and squad numbers last updated on 17 May 2024. Appearances include all competitions and official matches.
Note: Flags indicate national team as has been defined under FIFA eligibility rules. Players may hold more than one non-FIFA nationality.

No.	Player	Nat.	Position(s)	Date Of birth (age)	Year Signed	Previous club	Apps.	Goals
Goalkeepers
1	Ashraful Rana	(Bangladesh)	GK	1 May 1988 (aged 35)	2023	Sheikh Russel KC	19 (since 2023) (Note: Ashraful Rana played for the club during 2016-18 period. But accurate data of appearances and goals from that season haven't been found.)	0 (since 2023)
22	Showkat Hossen Hasan	(Bangladesh)	GK	3 January 1999 (aged 25)	2021	Fortis FC	4	0
30	Monirul Islam Tuhin	(Bangladesh)	GK	6 September 2003 (aged 20)	2023	Muktijoddha SKC	1	0
35	Nasrul Islam Hero	(Bangladesh)	GK	23 March 2003 (aged 21)	2023	Swadhinata KS	1	0
40	Ariful Islam	(Bangladesh)	GK	12 January 1989 (aged 35)	2024	Police FC	0	0
Defenders
2	Raihan Hasan	(Bangladesh)	RB / LB / CB	10 September 1994 (aged 29)	2023	Sheikh Jamal DC	17 (since 2023) (Note: Raihan Hasan played for the club during 2016-17 period. But accurate data of appearances and goals from that season haven't been found.)	0 (since 2023)
3	Rashedul Alam Moni	(Bangladesh)	CB	23 May 1987 (aged 36)	2023	Sheikh Jamal DC	1	0
4	Yeasin Khan (Captain)	(Bangladesh)	CB	16 September 1994 (aged 29)	2023	Sheikh Russel KC	19	1
5	Nasir Uddin Chowdhury (vice-captain)	(Bangladesh)	CB	9 October 1979 (aged 44)	2022	Sheikh Russel KC	36 (since 2022) (Note: Nasiruddin Chowdhury played for the club during 2016-17 period. But accurate data of appearances and goals from that season haven't been found.)	3 (since 2022)
12	Sajon Miah	(Bangladesh)	RB / RM	1 January 1996 (aged 28)	2023	AFC Uttara	13	0
15	Amit Hasan	(Bangladesh)	LB / LM	22 December 2002 (aged 21)	2023	Muktijoddha SKC	1	0
24	Riaj Uddin Sagor	(Bangladesh)	LWB / LM	5 April 2002 (aged 21)	2023	Muktijoddha SKC	17	2
28	Rifat Hasan Sarthok	(Bangladesh)	LB	14 November 2003 (aged 20)	2023	Sheikh Jamal DC	3	0
31	Zahid Hasan	(Bangladesh)			2024		0	0
44	Rostam Islam Dukhu Mia	(Bangladesh)	CB / RWB	13 December 2005 (aged 18)	2022	Sheikh Russel KC	23	0
Midfielders
6	Imran Hassan Remon	(Bangladesh)	DM	15 August 1992 (aged 31)	2022	Saif Sporting Club	34	0
7	Kawsar Ali Rabbi	(Bangladesh)	RM / LM	8 August 1996 (aged 27)	2023	Fortis FC	27	2
8	Hemonta Vinsent Biswas	(Bangladesh)	AM / RM	13 December 1995 (aged 28)	2023	Sheikh Russel KC	15 (since 2023) (Note: Hemonta Vinsent Biswas played for the club in 2015 Sheikh Kamal International Club Cup. But accurate data of appearances and goals from that tournament haven't been found.)	1 (since 2023)
13	Amiruzzaman Saymon	(Bangladesh)	AM / CF	13 October 1999 (aged 24)	2023	Fortis FC	3	1
14	Sabbir Hossain	(Bangladesh)	AM / CM	1 March 2003 (aged 21)	2023	Bangladesh Army	1	0
16	Sohel Rana	(Bangladesh)	DM / CM	13 December 1991 (aged 32)	2023	Sheikh Russel KC	14 (since 2023) (Note: Sohel Rana played for the club during 2016-18 period. But accurate data of appearances and goals from that period haven't been found.)	1 (since 2023)
17	Faysal Ahmed	(Bangladesh)	CM	2 December 1994 (aged 29)	2023	Sheikh Jamal DC	10	0
18	Ranju Sikder	(Bangladesh)	AM / LW	25 December 1998 (aged 25)	2023	Agrani Bank Ltd. SC	4	0
21	Sohanur Rahman Sohan	(Bangladesh)	CM	20 November 1999 (aged 24)	2023	Sheikh Jamal DC	7	0
27	Shakil Ali	(Bangladesh)	LM / RM	15 July 2000 (aged 23)	2023	Gopalganj SC	5	2
29	Asadul Islam Sakib	(Bangladesh)	LM / LWB / RM	29 July 2005 (aged 18)	2023	Uttar Baridhara	19	0
34	Wasiu Semiu	(Nigeria)	CM	5 December 2005 (aged 18)	2024	(Nigeria) Water FC Academy	7	0
66	Md Al Imran	(Bangladesh)	CM	10 October 1994 (aged 29)	2023	Agrani Bank Ltd. SC	4	0
Forwards
9	Mannaf Rabby	(Bangladesh)	LW / RW / CF	6 June 1996 (aged 27)	2023	Sheikh Jamal DC	48 (since 2019) (Note: Mannaf Rabby played for the club during 2017-18 period. But accurate data of appearances and goals from that period haven't been found.)	6 (since 2019)
11	Jamir Uddin	(Bangladesh)	LW	12 December 2002 (aged 21)	2022	Saif Sporting Club	36	1
19	Ojukwu David Ifegwu (vice-captain)	(Nigeria)	CF / SS	1 June 1996 (aged 27)	2022	(Nigeria) Remo Stars F.C.	42	18
20	Jahedul Alam	(Bangladesh)	CF / RW	18 November 1993 (aged 30)	2023	Fortis FC	9	0
25	Khudoyorkhon Sagdullaev	(Uzbekistan)	RW / LW / CF	12 January 1999 (aged 25)	2024	(Uzbekistan) FK Mash'al	7	0
32	Paul Komolafe	(Nigeria)	CF	12 June 2000 (aged 23)	2024	(Albania) KF Erzeni	7	4
37	Iftasam Rahman Jidan	(Bangladesh)	CF	18 October 2006 (aged 17)	2024	Kingstar SC	0	0
99	Emtiyaz Raihan	(Bangladesh)	CF / RW	27 August 1997 (aged 26)	2022	Agrani Bank SC	23	2
Left during the season
10	Abu Azeez	(Nigeria)	SS / RW	31 May 1994 (aged 29)	2023	(Nigeria) Warri Wolves	13	2
23	Arifur Rahman	(Bangladesh)	LW / RW	15 February 1999 (aged 25)	2023	Free agent	21	3
33	Alex Shorot Biswas	(Bangladesh)	RW	27 July 1996 (aged 27)	2023	Free agent	1	0
77	Lawal Muritala	(Nigeria)	DM / CM	13 December 2000 (aged 23)	2023	(Nigeria) Sunshine Stars	6	0

== Transfers ==
=== Transfers in ===
No.	Position	Player	Previous club	Fee	Date	Ref.
19	FW	(Nigeria) Ojukwu David Ifegwu	Dhaka Abahani	Loan return	31 August 2023	
-	MF	(Egypt) Mostafa Kahraba	Dhaka Abahani	Loan return	31 August 2023	
1	GK	Ashraful Rana	Sheikh Russel KC	Free	October 2023	
2	DF	Raihan Hasan	Sheikh Jamal DC	Free	October 2023	
3	DF	Rashedul Alam Moni	Sheikh Jamal DC	Free	October 2023	
4	DF	Yeasin Khan	Sheikh Russel KC	Free	October 2023	
7	MF	Kawsar Ali Rabbi	Fortis FC	Free	October 2023	
8	MF	Hemanta Vincent Biswas	Sheikh Russel KC	Free	October 2023	
9	FW	Mannaf Rabby	Sheikh Jamal DC	Free	October 2023	
10	FW	(Nigeria) Abu Azeez	(Nigeria) Warri Wolves F.C.	Free	October 2023	
12	DF	Sajon Miah	Muktijoddha SKC	Free	October 2023	
13	MF	Amiruzzaman Saymon	Fortis FC	Free	October 2023	
14	MF	Sabbir Hossain	Brothers Union	Free	October 2023	
15	DF	Amit Hasan	Muktijoddha SKC	Free	October 2023	
16	MF	Sohel Rana	Sheikh Russel KC	Free	October 2023	
17	MF	Faysal Ahmed	Sheikh Jamal DC	Free	October 2023	
18	MF	Ranju Sikder	Bangladesh Army	Free	October 2023	
20	FW	Jahedul Alam	Fortis FC	Free	October 2023	
21	MF	Sohanur Rahman Sohan	Sheikh Jamal DC	Free	October 2023	
23	FW	Arifur Rahman	Free agent	Free	October 2023	
24	DF	Riaj Uddin Sagor	Muktijoddha SKC	Free	October 2023	
27	MF	Shakil Ali	Gopalganj SC	Free	October 2023	
28	DF	Rifat Hasan Sarthok	Sheikh Jamal DC	Free	October 2023	
29	MF	Asadul Islam Sakib	Uttar Baridhara	Free	October 2023	
30	GK	Monirul Islam Tuhin	Muktijoddha SKC	Free	October 2023	
33	FW	Alex Shorot Biswas	Free agent	Free	October 2023	
35	GK	Nasrul Islam Hero	Swadhinata KS	Free	October 2023	
77	MF	(Nigeria) Lawal Muritala	(Nigeria) Sunshine Stars	Free	October 2023	
32	FW	(Nigeria) Paul Komolafe	(Albania) KF Erzeni	Free	21 March 2024	
25	FW	(Uzbekistan) Khudoyorkhon Sagdullaev	(Uzbekistan) FK Mash'al	Free	26 March 2024	
31	DF	Zahid Hasan		Free	March 2024	
34	MF	(Nigeria) Wasiu Semiu	(Nigeria) Water FC Academy	Free	March 2024	
37	FW	Iftasam Rahman Jidan	Kingstar SC	Free	March 2024	
40	GK	Ariful Islam	Police FC	Free	March 2024	

=== Transfers out ===
No.	Position	Player	Moved To	Fee	Date	Ref.
77	FW	Ekbal Hussain	Sheikh Russel KC	Free	July 2023	
10	FW	(Nigeria) Candy Augustine	Free agent	Free	July 2023	
22	GK	Nayeem Mia	Sheikh Russel KC	Free	July 2023	
7	MF	Anik Hossain	Rahmatganj MFS	Free	September 2023	
14	DF	Kazi Rahad Mia	Mohammedan SC	Free	September 2023	
1	GK	Pappu Hossain	Dhaka Abahani	Free	October 2023	
3	DF	(Uzbekistan) Shukurali Pulatov	(Uzbekistan) FC Shurtan Guzar	Free	October 2023	
4	DF	Soeb Mia	Rahmatganj MFS	Free	October 2023	
6	MF	Arafat Hossen	Rahmatganj MFS	Free	October 2023	
8	MF	Saker Ullah	Free agent	Free	October 2023	
12	FW	Rasel Ahmed	Free agent	Free	October 2023	
13	DF	Md. Tarek	Rahmatganj MFS	Free	October 2023	
15	DF	Apu Ahamed	PWD Sports Club	Free	October 2023	
16	FW	Md Nahian	Rahmatganj MFS	Free	October 2023	
20	FW	Saief Shamsud	Free agent	Free	October 2023	
21	MF	Farhad Mia Mona	Fortis FC	Free	October 2023	
23	DF	Md. Rockey	Rahmatganj MFS	Free	October 2023	
26	DF	Ashik Ahammed	PWD Sports Club	Free	October 2023	
28	DF	Md Alauddin	Free agent	Free	October 2023	
40	GK	Mohammed Shahidullah	Free agent	Free	October 2023	
70	MF	Rumon Hossain	PWD Sports Club	Free	October 2023	
98	MF	(Egypt) Mostafa Kahraba	Brothers Union	Free	October 2023	
23	FW	Arifur Rahman	Free agent	Free	March 2024	
33	FW	Alex Shorot Biswas	Free agent	Free	March 2024	
10	FW	(Nigeria) Abu Azeez	Free agent	Free	March 2024	
77	MF	(Nigeria) Lawal Muritala	Free agent	Free	March 2024	

=== Loans out ===
No.	Position	Player	Loaned to	Fee	Date	On loan until	Ref.
98	MF	(Egypt) Mostafa Kahraba	Dhaka Abahani	Free	1 August 2023	31 August 2023	
19	FW	(Nigeria) Ojukwu David Ifegwu	Dhaka Abahani	Free	1 August 2023	31 August 2023	

== Pre-season and friendlies ==
19 November 2023	Sheikh Jamal DC	3–1	Chittagong Abahani	Dhaka
14:50 BST (UTC+6)	Raihan 57' (o.g.); Al Amin 64', 69'	Report	Sohel 54'	Stadium: Sheikh Jamal Dhanmondi Club Ground

== Competitions ==
=== Overall record ===
Competition	First match	Last match	Starting round	Final position	Record							
Competition	First match	Last match	Starting round	Final position	Pld	W	D	L	GF	GA	GD	Win %
Premier League	22 December 2023	29 May 2024	Matchday 1	TBD	16	4	7	5	19	23	−4	25.00
Independence Cup	31 October 2023	5 December 2023	Group Stage	Quarter-final	3	0	2	1	1	2	−1	0.00
Federation Cup	16 January 2024	13 February 2024	Group Stage	Group Stage	3	1	0	2	4	5	−1	33.33
Total					22	5	9	8	24	30	−6	22.73

Last updated: 17 May 2024
Source: Soccerway

=== Premier League ===
==== League table ====
Pos	Team	Pld	W	D	L	GF	GA	GD	Pts
5	Fortis FC	18	6	6	6	21	23	−2	24
6	Sheikh Russel KC	18	4	7	7	20	24	−4	19
7	Chittagong Abahani	18	4	7	7	22	29	−7	19
8	Sheikh Jamal DC	18	4	5	9	14	24	−10	17
9	Rahmatganj MFS	18	2	10	6	19	26	−7	16

Source: Soccerway
Rules for classification: 1) Points; 2) Goal difference; 3) Goals scored.

==== Results summary ====
Overall								Home						Away					
Pld	W	D	L	GF	GA	GD	Pts	W	D	L	GF	GA	GD	W	D	L	GF	GA	GD
16	4	7	5	19	23	−4	19	2	3	3	7	13	−6	2	4	2	12	10	+2

Last updated: 17 May 2024.
Source: Soccerway

==== Results by round ====
Round	1	2	3	4	5	6	7	8	9	10	11	12	13	14	15	16	17	18
Ground	A	A (Note: Due to unavailability of Munshigonj Stadium, the fixture had been swapped and Bashundhara played as the home team in Bashundhara Kings Arena. In the reverse fixture, Chittagong Abahani will play as the home team in Munshigonj.)	A	H	A	A	H	A	H	H	H	H	A	H	H	A	H	A
Result	L	L	D	D	D	W	W	D	L	L	L	W	W	D	D	D		
Position	9	10	9	9	9	8	4	4	8	8	9	7	5	5	5	5		

Updated to match(es) played on 17 May 2024. Source: Matches
A = Away; H = Home; W = Win; D = Draw; L = Loss; P = Postponed
Notes: Positions show the situation at the end of the corresponding Rounds, not the position at the conclusion of matches or game days.

==== Matches ====
22 December 2023 1	Police FC	2–0	Chittagong Abahani	Mymensingh
14:30 BST (UTC+6)	E. Ibargüen 22', 43'; S. Kirmane (yellow card) 56'	Report	I. Remon (yellow card) 45+9'	Stadium: Rafiq Uddin Bhuiyan Stadium; Referee: Mohammed Jalal Uddin

30 December 2023 2	Bashundhara Kings	4–1	Chittagong Abahani	Dhaka
16:30 BST (UTC+6)	Dorielton 2', 40'; M. Figueira (yellow card) 4'; Rakib 29'; Bishwanath (yellow card) 30'; Robinho 87' (pen.)	Report	I. Remon (yellow card) 6'; A. Azeez 10'; Raihan (yellow card) 86'	Stadium: Bashundhara Sports Complex; Referee: Mohamad Alamgir Sarkar
Note: Due to unavailability of Bir Sreshtho Fl. Lt. Matiur Rahman Stadium in Munshigonj, the fixture had been swapped and Bashundhara played as the home team in Bashundhara Kings Arena. In the reverse fixture, Chittagong Abahani will play as the home team in Munshigonj.

12 January 2024 3	Rahmatganj MFS	1–1	Chittagong Abahani	Munshigonj
14:45 BST (UTC+6)	Soeb (yellow card) 21'; S. Konney 55'	Report	Yeasin 34'	Stadium: Bir Sreshtho Fl. Lt. Matiur Rahman Stadium; Referee: Anisur Rahman

20 January 2024 4	Chittagong Abahani	2–2	Brothers Union	Munshigonj
14:45 BST (UTC+6)	Faysal (yellow card) 15'; Jahedul (yellow card) 45'; M. Rabby 80'; Nasir 81'	Report	M. Sufil 12', 53'; B. Shodiev (yellow card) 45'; M. Kahraba (yellow card) 67'	Stadium: Bir Sreshtho Fl. Lt. Matiur Rahman Stadium; Referee: Bituraj Barua

26 January 2024 5	Dhaka Mohammedan	0–0	Chittagong Abahani	Mymensingh
14:45 BST (UTC+6)	Sanowar (yellow card) 6' (yellow-red card) 20'; M. Mithu (yellow card) 90+5'	Report	D. Ifegwu (yellow card) 73'	Stadium: Rafiq Uddin Bhuiyan Stadium; Referee: Alomgir Sarker

3 February 2024 6	Sheikh Jamal DC	0–2	Chittagong Abahani	Gopalganj
15:00 BST (UTC+6)	S. Kholmatov (yellow card) 88'	Report	M. Rabby (yellow card) 40', (goal) 52'; D. Ifegwu (yellow card) 88', (goal) 90+1'	Stadium: Sheikh Fazlul Haque Mani Stadium; Referee: Mohammed Jalal Uddin

10 February 2024 7	Chittagong Abahani	2–1	Sheikh Russel KC	Munshigonj
15:00 BST (UTC+6)	S. Rana 61' R. Sagor 69' Jamir (yellow card) 89'	Report	M. Ganto (yellow card) 42' Tanvir (yellow card) 63' L. Ndikumana 90' (pen.)	Stadium: Bir Sreshtho Fl. Lt. Matiur Rahman Stadium; Referee: Mohammed Jalal Uddin

17 February 2024 8	Dhaka Abahani	2–2	Chittagong Abahani	Gopalganj
15:00 BST (UTC+6)	C. Stewart 9' (pen.), 36', (yellow card) 90+5'; Rahim (yellow card) 28'; Shahidul (yellow card) 45'; A. Bablu (yellow card) 78'; M. Ridoy (yellow card) 84'	Report	L. Muritala (yellow card) 45'; D. Ifegwu 45+3' (pen.), 54'; A. Rana (yellow card) 90+1'	Stadium: Sheikh Fazlul Haque Mani Stadium; Referee: Jasim Akhter

24 February 2024 9	Chittagong Abahani	0–2	Fortis FC	Munshigonj
15:00 BST (UTC+6)	L. Muritala (yellow card) 63'	Report	F. Mona (yellow card) 28'; Sabuz (yellow card) 46'; J. Jumayev (yellow card) 64'; L. Muritala 76' (o.g.); O. Sarr 82'	Stadium: Bir Sreshtho Fl. Lt. Matiur Rahman Stadium; Referee: Mohammed Jalal Uddin

29 March 2024 10	Chittagong Abahani	0–1	Police FC	Munshigonj
15:15 BST (UTC+6)	P. Komolafe (yellow card) 51'; M. Rabby (yellow card) 59'; D. Ifegwu (yellow card) 90'; W. Semiu (yellow card) 90+4'	Report	Joyonto (yellow card) 51'; Al Amin 79'	Stadium: Bir Sreshtho Fl. Lt. Matiur Rahman Stadium; Referee: Saymoon Sunny

5 April 2024 11	Chittagong Abahani	0–5	Bashundhara Kings	Munshigonj
15:15 BST (UTC+6)	Mannaf (yellow card) 79'	Report	Dorielton 2'; Robinho 12' (pen.); Rakib 19', 53'; Sohel (yellow card) 27'; A. Gafurov 45+1'; Bishwanath (yellow card) 66'; Sohel (yellow card) 68'	Stadium: Bir Sreshtho Fl. Lt. Matiur Rahman Stadium; Referee: Mohammed Nasiruddin

20 April 2024 12	Chittagong Abahani	2–1	Rahmatganj MFS	Munshigonj
15:45 BST (UTC+6)	P. Komolafe 15', (yellow card) 49'; M. Alif 49' (o.g.); A. Rana (yellow card) 88'; Shakil (yellow card) 90+7'	Report	N. Rasel (yellow card) 20'; E. Boateng 57' (pen.), (yellow card) 76'	Stadium: Bir Sreshtho Fl. Lt. Matiur Rahman Stadium; Referee: Saymoon Sunny

27 April 2024 13	Brothers Union	0–5	Chittagong Abahani	Rajshahi
15:15 BST (UTC+6)		Report	Nasir 18'; P. Komolafe 32', 90+2'; R. Sagor 60'; D. Ifegwu 74' (pen.)	Stadium: Muktijuddho Sriti Stadium; Referee: Zamal Farouqee Nahid

3 May 2024 14	Chittagong Abahani	1–1	Dhaka Mohammedan	Munshigonj
16:00 BST (UTC+6)	D. Ifegwu 34', (yellow card) 63'; A. Rana (yellow card) 76'	Report	Arif 27'; E. Tony (yellow card) 32'	Stadium: Bir Sreshtho Fl. Lt. Matiur Rahman Stadium; Referee: Saymoon Sunny

11 May 2024 15	Chittagong Abahani	0–0	Sheikh Jamal DC	Munshigonj
16:00 BST (UTC+6)	Sakib (yellow card) 74'	Report	S. Kholmatov (yellow card) 35'; Rajib (yellow card) 51'	Stadium: Bir Sreshtho Fl. Lt. Matiur Rahman Stadium; Referee: Zamal Farouqee Nahid

17 May 2024 16	Sheikh Russel KC	1–1	Chittagong Abahani	Dhaka
16:00 BST (UTC+6)	Shahin (yellow card) 43'; G. Ogungbe 73'	Report	P. Komolafe 11'; D. Ifegwu (yellow card) 45+1'; R. Dukhu (yellow card) 84'	Stadium: Bashundhara Kings Arena; Referee: Mohamed Mizanur Rahman

25 May 2024 17	Chittagong Abahani	v	Dhaka Abahani	Munshigonj
16:00 BST (UTC+6)		Report		Stadium: Bir Sreshtho Fl. Lt. Matiur Rahman Stadium

29 May 2024 18	Fortis FC	v	Chittagong Abahani	Rajshahi
16:00 BST (UTC+6)		Report		Stadium: Muktijuddho Sriti Stadium

=== Independence Cup ===
==== Group stage ====
The draw ceremony were held on 23 October 2023 at 3rd floor of BFF house Motijheel, Dhaka. There are thirteen team was divided into four groups. Top two team from each group will through in the Knockout stage.

Pos	Team	Pld	W	D	L	GF	GA	GD	Pts	Qualification
1	Bashundhara Kings	2	1	1	0	1	0	+1	4	Advance to Knockout stage
2	Chittagong Abahani	2	0	2	0	1	1	0	2	Advance to Knockout stage
3	Bangladesh Navy FT	2	0	1	1	1	2	−1	1	

Source: GSA
Rules for classification: Group stage tiebreakers

31 October 2023 2	Bangladesh Navy FT	1–1	Chittagong Abahani	Dhaka
18:00 BST (UTC+6)	S. Reza 12'; S. Sarkar (yellow card) 45+1'		Jamir (yellow card) 17'; Hemonta 74'	Stadium: Bashundhara Kings Arena; Referee: Zamal Farouqee Nahid

1 December 2023 3	Chittagong Abahani	0–0	Bashundhara Kings	Dhaka
14:30 BST (UTC+6)	A. Azeez (yellow card) 82'	Report	S. Rana (yellow card) 45+1'	Stadium: Bashundhara Kings Arena; Referee: Bhubon Mohon Torafder

==== Knockout phase ====
===== Quarter-final =====
5 December 2023 Quarter-final	Mohammedan SC	1–0	Chittagong Abahani	Munshiganj
13:45	Manik (yellow card) 83'; Muzaffarov 97' (yellow card) 103'; Tony (yellow card) 111'; Diabate (yellow card) 120+5'	Report	Remon (yellow card) 91'; A. Azeez (yellow card) 94'; Sakib (yellow card) 79' (yellow-red card) 115'	Stadium: Shaheed Bir Sreshtho Flight Lieutenant Matiur Rahman Stadium; Referee: Jashim Akhter

=== Federation Cup ===
==== Group stage ====
The draw ceremony were held on 13 December 2023 at BFF house in Motijheel, Dhaka. There are ten team was divided into three groups. Top two teams from each group and two best third-placed teams will through in the knockout stage.

Pos	Team	Pld	W	D	L	GF	GA	GD	Pts	Qualification
1	Mohammedan SC	3	3	0	0	6	3	+3	9	Advance to Knockout stage
2	Abahani Limited Dhaka	3	2	0	1	10	2	+8	6	Advance to Knockout stage
3	Chittagong Abahani	3	1	0	2	4	5	−1	3	
4	Brothers Union	3	0	0	3	1	11	−10	0	

Source: Soccerway
Rules for classification: Group stages tiebreakers

16 January 2024 1	Dhaka Mohammedan	2–1	Chittagong Abahani	Gopalganj
14:45 BST (UTC+6)	Jafar (yellow card) 29', (goal) 45+3'; Muzaffarov 55'; M. Ballu (yellow card) 87'; Sujon (yellow card) 90+2'	Report	A. Azeez 14'; A. Saymon (yellow card) 22'	Stadium: Sheikh Fazlul Haque Mani Stadium; Referee: Saymoon Hasan Sany

30 January 2024 2	Chittagong Abahani	0–3	Dhaka Abahani	Dhaka
14:45 BST (UTC+6)	A. Sakib (yellow card) 59'; I. Remon (yellow card) 89'	Report	M. Soleimani (yellow card) 40'; B. Rocha 43'; Emeka 47'; Brandāo 83'	Stadium: Bashundhara Kings Arena; Referee: Md Jashim Akther

13 February 2024 3	Chittagong Abahani	3–0	Brothers Union	Munshigonj
15:00 BST (UTC+6)	Shakil 8', 20'; E. Raihan (yellow card) 62'; A. Saymon 72'	Report	A. Noyon (yellow card) 45+3'	Stadium: Bir Sreshtho Fl. Lt. Matiur Rahman Stadium; Referee: Mohammed Jalal Uddin

== Statistics ==
As of 17 May 2024

=== Squad statistics ===
Includes all competitions.

No.	Pos	Nat	Player	Total		Premier League		Federation Cup		Independence Cup	
No.	Pos	Nat	Player	Apps	Goals	Apps	Goals	Apps	Goals	Apps	Goals
Goalkeepers
1	GK	(Bangladesh) BAN	Ashraful Rana	19	0	14	0	2	0	3	0
22	GK	(Bangladesh) BAN	Showkat Hossen Hasan	4	0	1+2	0	1	0	0	0
30	GK	(Bangladesh) BAN	Monirul Islam Tuhin	1	0	1	0	0	0	0	0
35	GK	(Bangladesh) BAN	Nasrul Islam Hero	1	0	0	0	0+1	0	0	0
40	GK	(Bangladesh) BAN	Ariful Islam	0	0	0	0	0	0	0	0
Defenders
2	DF	(Bangladesh) BAN	Raihan Hasan	17	0	15+1	0	0+1	0	0	0
3	DF	(Bangladesh) BAN	Rashedul Alam Moni	1	0	0	0	1	0	0	0
4	DF	(Bangladesh) BAN	Yeasin Khan	19	1	14	1	2	0	3	0
5	DF	(Bangladesh) BAN	Nasir Uddin Chowdhury	14	2	6+2	2	3	0	3	0
12	DF	(Bangladesh) BAN	Sajon Miah	13	0	6+2	0	2	0	3	0
15	DF	(Bangladesh) BAN	Amit Hasan	1	0	0	0	0	0	1	0
24	DF	(Bangladesh) BAN	Riaj Uddin Sagor	17	2	11+4	2	1+1	0	0	0
28	DF	(Bangladesh) BAN	Rifat Hasan Sarthok	3	0	1	0	1	0	0+1	0
31	DF	(Bangladesh) BAN	Zahid Hasan	0	0	0	0	0	0	0	0
44	DF	(Bangladesh) BAN	Rostam Islam Dukhu Mia	12	0	10+1	0	1	0	0	0
Midfielders
6	MF	(Bangladesh) BAN	Imran Hassan Remon	17	0	13+2	0	1	0	1	0
7	MF	(Bangladesh) BAN	Kawsar Ali Rabbi	6	0	2+1	0	1	0	0+2	0
8	MF	(Bangladesh) BAN	Hemonta Vinsent Biswas	15	1	3+7	0	1+1	0	3	1
13	MF	(Bangladesh) BAN	Amiruzzaman Saymon	3	1	1	0	1+1	1	0	0
14	MF	(Bangladesh) BAN	Sabbir Hossain	1	0	0+1	0	0	0	0	0
16	MF	(Bangladesh) BAN	Sohel Rana	14	1	8+3	1	1	0	2	0
17	MF	(Bangladesh) BAN	Faysal Ahmed	10	0	1+5	0	1	0	3	0
18	MF	(Bangladesh) BAN	Ranju Sikder	4	0	0+2	0	1+1	0	0	0
21	MF	(Bangladesh) BAN	Sohanur Rahman Sohan	7	0	0+2	0	1+1	0	0+3	0
27	MF	(Bangladesh) BAN	Shakil Ali	5	2	0+4	0	1	2	0	0
29	MF	(Bangladesh) BAN	Asadul Islam Sakib	19	0	14	0	2	0	2+1	0
34	MF	(Nigeria) NGR	Wasiu Semiu	7	0	7	0	0	0	0	0
66	MF	(Bangladesh) BAN	Md Al Imran	2	0	0+1	0	1	0	0	0
Forwards
9	FW	(Bangladesh) BAN	Mannaf Rabby	17	2	11+3	2	0+1	0	1+1	0
11	FW	(Bangladesh) BAN	Jamir Uddin	15	0	1+10	0	2+1	0	1	0
19	FW	(Nigeria) NGR	Ojukwu David Ifegwu	16	5	13	5	0+1	0	2	0
20	FW	(Bangladesh) BAN	Jahedul Alam	9	0	1+4	0	1+1	0	1+1	0
25	FW	(Uzbekistan) UZB	Khudoyorkhon Sagdullaev	7	0	4+3	0	0	0	0	0
32	FW	(Nigeria) NGR	Paul Komolafe	7	4	7	4	0	0	0	0
37	FW	(Bangladesh) BAN	Iftasam Rahman Jidan	0	0	0	0	0	0	0	0
99	FW	(Bangladesh) BAN	Emtiyaz Raihan	5	0	0+2	0	2+1	0	0	0
Players who left during the season
10	FW	(Nigeria) NGR	Abu Azeez	13	2	8+1	1	1+1	1	2	0
23	FW	(Bangladesh) BAN	Arifur Rahman	2	0	0	0	0	0	0+2	0
33	FW	(Bangladesh) BAN	Alex Shorot Biswas	1	0	0	0	0+1	0	0	0
77	MF	(Nigeria) NGR	Lawal Muritala	6	0	3	0	1	0	2	0

Source: Soccerway

=== Goalscorers ===
Includes all competitive matches. The list is sorted alphabetically by surname when total goals are equal.

Rank	No.	Pos.	Player	Premier League	Federation Cup	Independence Cup	Total
1	19	FW	(Nigeria) David Ifegwu	5	0	0	5
2	32	FW	(Nigeria) Paul Komolafe	4	0	0	4
3	10	FW	(Nigeria) Abu Azeez	1	1	0	2
3	27	MF	(Bangladesh) Shakil Ali	0	2	0	2
3	9	FW	(Bangladesh) Mannaf Rabby	2	0	0	2
3	24	MF	(Bangladesh) Riaj Sagor	2	0	0	2
3	5	DF	(Bangladesh) Nasir Uddin	2	0	0	2
5	8	MF	(Bangladesh) Hemonta Biswas	0	0	1	1
5	4	DF	(Bangladesh) Yeasin Khan	1	0	0	1
5	16	MF	(Bangladesh) Sohel Rana	1	0	0	1
5	13	MF	(Bangladesh) Amiruzzaman Saymon	0	1	0	1
Own goals				1	0	0	0
Totals				19	4	1	24

=== Assists ===
Includes all competitive matches. The list is sorted alphabetically by surname when total assists are equal.

Rank	No.	Pos.	Player	Premier League	Federation Cup	Independence Cup	Total
1	9	FW	(Bangladesh) Mannaf Rabby	3	0	0	3
2	10	FW	(Nigeria) Abu Azeez	2	0	0	2
2	19	FW	(Nigeria) David Ifegwu	2	0	0	2
2	99	FW	(Bangladesh) Emtiyaz Raihan	1	1	0	2
3	17	MF	(Bangladesh) Faysal Ahmed	0	1	0	1
3	44	DF	(Bangladesh) Rostam Islam Dukhu	1	0	0	1
3	3	DF	(Bangladesh) Rashedul Moni	0	1	0	1
3	29	MF	(Bangladesh) Asadul Sakib	0	0	1	1
3	34	MF	(Nigeria) Wasiu Semiu	1	0	0	1
Totals				10	3	1	14
