= 2022–23 AFC Uttara season =

AFC Uttara 2022–23 football season

AFC Uttara
2022–23 season
- Owner: Atiqul Islam
- President: Saidur Rahman Manik
- Head coach: Monwar Hossain Moyna
- Stadium: Rafiq Uddin Bhuiyan Stadium
- Bangladesh Premier League: 11th of 11
- Federation Cup: Group stages
- Independence Cup: Group stages
- Top goalscorer: League: (Bangladesh) Sakib Bepari (2 goals); All: (Bangladesh) Sakib Bepari (3 goals)
- Biggest defeat: 0–7 Dhaka Mohammedan (10 January 2023); 0–7 Dhaka Abahani (24 February 2023)

The 2022–23 season was AFC Uttara's 14th season since its establishment in 2009 and their 1st season in the Bangladesh Premier League. They achieved promotion to the Bangladesh Premier league after being second of the 2021–22 Bangladesh Championship League. In addition to domestic league, AFC Uttara was participated on this season's edition of Federation Cup and Independence Cup. The season covered period was 8 November 2022 to 22 July 2023.

== Current squad ==
AFC Uttara squad for 2022–23 season.

As of 7 November 2022

Note: Flags indicate national team as defined under FIFA eligibility rules; some limited exceptions apply. Players may hold more than one non-FIFA nationality.

No.	Pos.	Nation	Player
1	GK	BAN	Jahaid Hasan Rabbi
2	DF	BAN	Ashik Ahmed
3	DF	BAN	Jintu Mia
4	DF	BAN	Istekharul Alam Sakil
6	MF	BAN	Anik Ghosh
7	MF	BAN	Alamgir Hosen Anik
8	MF	BAN	Abdullah
9	FW	NGR	Lukman Adefemi
10	FW	BAN	Sarowar Zaman Nipu
11	FW	BAN	Md. Sohel
12	FW	BAN	Fahim Ahmed
13	DF	BAN	Rakib Sarkar
14	MF	BAN	Salauddin Rubel
15	FW	BAN	Mehebub Hasan Noyon
17	FW	BAN	Mujahid Hossain Joy
18	MF	BAN	Jayed Ahmed
19	FW	BAN	Arman Foysal Akash
20	FW	BAN	Naim Uddin
21	MF	KGZ	Sultanbek Momunov
22	GK	BAN	Azad Hossain
23	FW	BAN	Masum Mia
24	DF	BAN	Zahidul Islam Babu
25	GK	BAN	Kamal Hossain Titu
26	DF	BAN	Khorshed Alam
27	DF	BAN	Sagar Mia
28	DF	BAN	Arman Sadi
29	MF	BAN	Hridoy Hossain
30	GK	BAN	Mohammad Razib
33	DF	GUI	Younoussa Camara
66	DF	BAN	Rayhan Ahmed
70	MF	BAN	Rohit Sarkar
77	FW	BAN	Shariar Bappi
88	FW	BAN	Sakib Bepari
98	FW	COL	Richard Maturana
99	FW	RUS	Alan Koroev

== Transfer ==
=== In ===
No.	Pos	Player	Previous club	Fee	Date	Source
	MF	(Bangladesh) Maruf Ahmed	(Bangladesh) Uttar Baridhara Club	Free transfer	6 August 2022	
	DF	(Bangladesh) Jintu Mia	(Bangladesh) Uttar Baridhara Club	Free transfer	10 October 2022	
	MF	(Bangladesh) Jayed Ahmed	(Bangladesh) Saif Sporting Club	Free transfer	18 October 2022	
	MF	(Bangladesh) Fahim Ahmed	(Bangladesh) Sheikh Russel KC	Free transfer	18 October 2022	
	GK	(Bangladesh) Mohamed Razib	(Bangladesh) Muktijoddha Sangsad KC	Free transfer	5 November 2022	
	FW	(Bangladesh) Masum Mia	(Bangladesh) Chittagong Abahani	Free transfer	7 November 2022	
	FW	(Colombia) José Luis Mosquera	(Lithuania) FC Hegelmann	Free transfer	3 November 2022	
	DF	(Bangladesh) Khorshed Alam	(Bangladesh) Fortis FC	Free transfer	7 November 2022	
	DF	(Bangladesh) Sakib Bepari	(Bangladesh) Wari Club Dhaka	Free transfer	11 November 2023	
	DF	(Kyrgyzstan) Sultanbek Momunov	(Kyrgyzstan) FC Nur-Batken	Free transfer	1 January 2023	
–	FW	(Guinea) Younoussa Camara	Unattached	Free transfer	16 March 2023	

== Competitions ==
Win Draw Loss Fixtures

=== Overall ===
Competition	First match	Last match	Final Position
BPL	9 December 2022	21 July 2023	11th
Federation Cup	20 December 2022	31 January 2023	Group stages
Independence Cup	14 November 2022	22 November 2022	Group stages

=== Overview ===
Competition	Record							
Competition	Pld	W	D	L	GF	GA	GD	Win %
BPL	20	0	5	15	10	56	−46	0.00
Independence Cup	3	0	0	3	2	8	−6	0.00
Federation Cup	3	0	0	3	1	12	−11	0.00
Total	26	0	5	21	13	76	−63	0.00

Source: Competitions

=== Premier League ===
==== League table ====
Pos	Team	Pld	W	D	L	GF	GA	GD	Pts	Qualification or relegation
7	Fortis FC	20	5	8	7	23	25	−2	23	
8	Chittagong Abahani	20	4	9	7	26	35	−9	21	
9	Rahmatganj MFS	20	4	7	9	15	31	−16	19	
10	Muktijoddha Sangsad KC (R)	20	4	3	13	19	42	−23	15	Relegation to Championship League
11	AFC Uttara (R)	20	0	5	15	10	56	−46	5	Relegation to Championship League

Source: Soccerway
Rules for classification: 1) Points; 2) Goal difference; 3) Goals scored.
(R) Relegated

==== Results summary ====
Overall								Home						Away					
Pld	W	D	L	GF	GA	GD	Pts	W	D	L	GF	GA	GD	W	D	L	GF	GA	GD
20	0	5	15	10	58	−48	5	0	3	7	6	31	−25	0	2	8	4	27	−23

Source: Soccerway

==== Results by round ====
Round	1	2	3	4	5	6	7	8	9	10	11	12	13	14	15	16	17	18	19	20	21	22
Ground	A	(Note: No AFC Uttara matchday in this round.)	H	A	H	A	H	A	H	A	H	H	(Note: No AFC Uttara matchday in this round.)	A	H	A	H	A	H	A	H	A
Result	L	–	L	L	L	L	D	L	L	D	L	D	–	L	L	L	L	L	D	L	L	L
Position	11	11	11	10	11	11	11	11	11	11	11	11	11	11	11	11	11	11	11	11	11	11

Source: Matches
A = Away; H = Home; W = Win; D = Draw; L = Loss; P = Postponed

=== Matches ===
9 December 2022 1	Bashundhara Kings	3–0	AFC Uttara	Dhaka
14:30 BST (UTC+6)	Robinho 4'; Dorielton 19'; Rakib 38'; Rimon (yellow card) 38'; Morsalin (yellow card) 90+5'	Report	S. Bepari (yellow card) 36'	Stadium: Bashundhara Kings Arena; Referee: Md Alamgir Sarkar

31 December 2022 3	AFC Uttara	0–1	Fortis FC	Mymensingh
14:30 BST (UTC+6)		Report	Mojibor Rahman Jony (yellow card) 5'; Shakhawat 29'	Stadium: Rafiq Uddin Bhuiyan Stadium; Referee: Rimon Mahmud

7 January 2023 4	Rahmatganj MFS	1–0	AFC Uttara	Munshigonj
14:45 BST (UTC+6)	Jhoaho Hinestroza 78'; Mohammed Al Amin (yellow card) 88'	Report	Zahidul Islam Babu (yellow card) 42'; Sakib Bepari (yellow card) 62'	Stadium: Shaheed Bir Sreshtho Flight Lt. Matiur Rahman Stadium; Referee: Sabuj Das

13 January 2023 5	AFC Uttara	0–1	Muktijoddha Sangsad KC	Mymensingh
14:45 BST (UTC+6)	Jayed Ahmed (yellow card) 46'	Report	Adeyinka Najeem 59'; Mohammad Rashedul Islam Rashed (yellow card) 64'; Sajib (yellow card) 90+1'	Stadium: Rafiq Uddin Bhuiyan Stadium; Referee: Sabuj Das

20 January 2023 6	Bangladesh Police FC	4–0	AFC Uttara	Mymensingh
15:00 BST (UTC+6)	Robiul 15', 59' (yellow card) 44'; José Alexander Hernández 23'; Monaem (yellow card) 47'; Mateo Palacios 75'	Report	Zahidul Islam Babu (yellow card) 43'; Jayed Ahmed (yellow card) 52'	Stadium: Rafiq Uddin Bhuiyan Stadium; Referee: Anisur Rahman

27 January 2023 7	AFC Uttara	1–1	Chittagong Abahani	Mymensingh
15:00 BST (UTC+6)	Sultanbek Momunov 7'; Rayhan Ahmed (yellow card) 20'; Sakib Bepari (yellow card) 37'; Mohammad Rajib (yellow card) 43'; Md Ganto (yellow card) 90+2'	Report	Ojukwu David Ifegwu 58' (pen.) (yellow card) 90+4'; Jamir Uddin (yellow card) 76'	Stadium: Rafiq Uddin Bhuiyan Stadium; Referee: Sowmik Paul

4 February 2023 8	Sheikh Russel KC	1–0	AFC Uttara	Dhaka
15:15 BST (UTC+6)	Shawkat Russel (yellow card) 35'; Brossou 55' (pen.)	Report	Rayhan Ahmed (red card) 50'; Salauddin Rubel (yellow card) 51'; Sarower Zaman Nipu (yellow card) 80'	Stadium: Bashundhara Kings Arena; Referee: Jasim Akhter

10 February 2023 9	AFC Uttara	0–6	Dhaka Mohammedan	Mymensingh
15:45 BST (UTC+6)	Jintu Mia (yellow card) 45'; Sarower Zaman Nipu (yellow card) 49'	Report	Souleymane 21' (pen.), 35', 70'; Manik (yellow card) 37'; Febles 63'; Arif Hossain 80'; Sazzad 87'	Stadium: Rafiq Uddin Bhuiyan Stadium; Referee: Md Mizanur Rahman

17 February 2023 10	Sheikh Jamal DC	3–3	AFC Uttara	Gopalganj
15:45 BST (UTC+6)	Obidur 13'; Stewart 62' (pen.), 79'; Mohamed Abu Shaied (yellow card) 69'; Otabek Valizhonov (yellow card) 88'	Report	Sarower Zaman Nipu 34'; Sultanbek Momunov 43'; Jintu Mia (yellow card) 78'; Rohit Sarkar 59' (yellow card) 66'; Salauddin Ruhel (yellow card) 78'; Mohamed Razib (yellow card) 78'	Stadium: Sheikh Fazlul Haque Mani Stadium; Referee: Sabuj Das

24 February 2023 11	AFC Uttara	0–7	Dhaka Abahani	Mymensingh
15:45 BST (UTC+6)	Rayhan Ahmed (yellow card) 18'	Report	Fahim 35', 57', 79'; Eleta 53', 61', 90+4'; Jibon 64'	Stadium: Rafiq Uddin Bhuiyan Stadium; Referee: Jasim Akther

7 April 2023 12	AFC Uttara	1–1	Bashundhara Kings	Mymensingh
15:45 BST (UTC+6)	Sarower Zaman Nipu (yellow card) 8'; Sajon Mia (yellow card) 45+5'; Rayhan Ahmed (yellow card) 56'; Mohammad Abdullah Tofel (yellow card) 56'; Sakib Bepari 90+6' (yellow card) 90+7'	Report	Masuk (yellow card) 48'; Robinho 57'; Tariq (yellow card) 63'; Saad (yellow card) 67'	Stadium: Rafiq Uddin Bhuiyan Stadium; Referee: Md Saymoon Hasan Sany

29 April 2023 13	Fortis FC	4–0	AFC Uttara	Rajshahi
15:45 BST (UTC+6)	Amredin 3'; Gaira Joof 72'; Pa Omar 78'; Shakhawat 90+4'	Report	Istekharul Alam Shakil (yellow card) 90+3'	Stadium: Muktijuddho Sriti Stadium; Referee: Bhubon Mohon Tarafder

6 May 2023 15	AFC Uttara	2–3	Rahmatganj MFS	Mymensingh
16:00 BST (UTC+6)	Richard Maturana 24'; Sakib Bepari 54'	Report	Ebimobowei 32'; Diallo 55'; Samim Yasir Juel 73'	Stadium: Rafiq Uddin Bhuiyan Stadium; Referee: Bituraj Barua

13 May 2023 16	Muktijoddha Sangsad KC	1–1	AFC Uttara	Gopalganj
16:00 BST (UTC+6)	Emmanuel 51'	Report	Richard Maturana 16'; Salauddin Rubel (yellow card) 61'; Jayed Ahmed (yellow card) 85'	Stadium: Sheikh Fazlul Haque Mani Stadium; Referee: Golam Murshed Chowdhury Nayon

20 May 2023 17	AFC Uttara	0–7	Bangladesh Police FC	Mymensingh
16:00 BST (UTC+6)		Report	Aarango (yellow card) 5' (goal) 19', 82' (pen.); Robiul 32'; Quazem 48'; Mohammed Abdallah 55', 62'; Edward Morillo 79'; Shamol Bepari (yellow card) 81'	Stadium: Rafiq Uddin Bhuiyan Stadium; Referee: Md Jalal Uddin

26 May 2023 18	Chittagong Abahani	1–0	AFC Uttara	Munshigonj
16:00 BST (UTC+6)	Emtiyaz Raihan 86'	Report		Stadium: Shaheed Bir Sreshtho Flight Lt. Matiur Rahman Stadium; Referee: Mohammed Jalal Uddin

2 June 2023 19	AFC Uttara	1–1	Sheikh Russel KC	Mymensingh
16:00 BST (UTC+6)	Richard Maturana 22' (yellow card) 45+1'	Report	Brossou 45+8'; Faisal Ahmed Shitol (yellow card) 85'	Stadium: Rafiq Uddin Bhuiyan Stadium; Referee: Golam Mourshed Chowdhury Nayon

7 June 2023 20	Dhaka Mohammedan	6–0	AFC Uttara	Comilla
16:00 BST (UTC+6)	Diabate 10', 68', 89'; Emmanuel 49'; Sanowar Hossain Lal 54'; Emon 83'	Report	Younoussa Camara (yellow card) 45+2'	Stadium: Shaheed Dhirendranath Datta Stadium; Referee: Bituraj Barua

14 July 2023 21	AFC Uttara	1–3	Sheikh Jamal DC	Mymensingh
16:00 BST (UTC+6)	Naim Uddin Noyon 69'; Rohit Sarkar (yellow card) 74'	Report	Stewart 59'; Mannaf Rabby 63'; Nodir Mavlynaov (yellow card) 56'	Stadium: Rafiq Uddin Bhuiyan Stadium; Referee: Jashim Akhter

21 July 2023 22	Dhaka Abahani	1–0	AFC Uttara	Comilla
16:00 BST (UTC+6)	Papon (yellow card) 55'; Jibon 70'	Report	Istekharul Alam Shakil (yellow card) 4'; Richard Maturana (yellow card) 35'	Stadium: Shaheed Dhirendranath Datta Stadium; Referee: Sabuj Das

=== Federation Cup ===
==== Group stages ====
Pos	Team	Pld	W	D	L	GF	GA	GD	Pts	Qualification
1	Mohammedan SC	3	2	1	0	10	2	+8	7	Advance to knockout phase
2	Rahmatganj MFS	3	2	0	1	5	2	+3	6	Advance to knockout phase
3	Sheikh Jamal DC	3	1	1	1	5	5	0	4	Advance to knockout phase
4	AFC Uttara	3	0	0	3	1	12	−11	0	

Source: Footystats
Rules for classification: Group stage tiebreakers

20 December 2022	AFC Uttara	0–3	Sheikh Jamal DC	Munshigonj
14:30 BST (UTC+6)	Mohammed Rajib (red card) 47'	Report	Otabek Valizhonov 1' (pen.); Kawshik Barua 75'; Mannaf Rabby 78'	Stadium: Munshigonj District Stadium; Referee: Sabuj Das

10 January 2023	Dhaka Mohammedan	7–0	AFC Uttara	Comilla
14:45 BST (UTC+6)	Muzaffar Muzaffarov 5', 52' (yellow card) 90'; Roger 7'; Febles 39'; Sazzad 49' (pen.), 60'; Shahriar Emon 51' (yellow card) 65'	Report	Rakib Sarker (yellow card) 13'; Mohammad Rajib (yellow card) 76'	Stadium: Shaheed Dhirendranath Datta Stadium; Referee: Rimon Mahmud

31 January 2023	AFC Uttara	1–2	Rahmatganj MFS	Cumilla
15:00 BST (UTC+6)	Rohit Sarkar 6'; Ashik Ahmed (yellow card) 18'; Arman Sadi (yellow card) 54'	Report	Jhoaho Hinestroza 71' (pen.); Khondoker Ashraful Islam 74'	Stadium: Shaheed Dhirendranath Datta Stadium; Referee: Rimon Mahmud

=== Independence Cup ===
==== Group stage ====
Pos	Team	Pld	W	D	L	GF	GA	GD	Pts	Qualification
1	Bashundhara Kings (C)	3	3	0	0	19	0	+19	9	Advance to Knockout stage
2	Chittagong Abahani	3	2	0	1	6	3	+3	6	Advance to Knockout stage
3	Fakirerpool YMC	3	1	0	2	3	19	−16	3	
4	AFC Uttara	3	0	0	3	2	8	−6	0	

Source: GSA
(C) Champions

14 November 2022	AFC Uttara	1––2	Chittagong Abahani	Gopalganj
14:00 BST (UTC+6)	Niam 73'	Report	Bamba 16'; Ojukwu 76'	Stadium: Sheikh Fazlul Haque Mani Stadium; Referee: Golam Mourshed Chowdhury Nayan

18 November 2022	AFC Uttara	0–3	Bashundhara Kings	Gopalganj
14:00		Report	Rakib 11'; Dorielton 57' (pen.), 90+1'	Stadium: Sheikh Fazlul Haque Mani Stadium; Referee: Md Anisur Rahman Sagor

22 November 2022	AFC Uttara	1––3	Fakirerpool YMC	Comilla
13:00	Sakib 42'	Report	Rezzatul 15'; Afzal 31'; Dalim 76'	Stadium: Comilla District Stadium; Referee: Md Nasiruddin

== Statistics ==
=== Goalscorers ===
As of match played till 21 July 2023

Rank	Player	Position	Total	BPL	Independence Cup	Federation Cup
1	(Bangladesh) Shakib Bepari	FW	3	2	1	0
1	(Colombia) Richard Maturana	FW	3	3	0	0
2	(Bangladesh) Niam Uddin	FW	2	1	1	0
2	(Bangladesh) Rohit Sarkar	MF	2	1	0	1
2	(Kyrgyzstan) Sultanbek Momunov	MF	2	2	0	0
3	(Bangladesh) Sarower Zaman Nipu	FW	1	1	0	0
Total			13	10	2	1

Source: Matches
