= 2022–23 Bangladesh Premier League (football) =

15th professional season of the top-flight football league in Bangladesh

Bangladesh Premier League
- Season: 2022–23
- Dates: 9 December 2022–22 July 2023
- Champions: Bashundhara Kings (4th title)
- Relegated: AFC Uttara; Muktijoddha Sangsad KC
- AFC Challenge League: Bashundhara Kings
- Matches: 110
- Goals: 324 (2.95 per match)
- Best player: Best Player: Robinho Azevedo (Bashundhara Kings); Best Local Player: Rakib Hossain (Bashundhara Kings)
- Top goalscorer: Overall: (20 goals); Dori (Bashundhara Kings); Local Topscorer: (8 goals); Eleta Kingsley (Abahani Limited Dhaka)
- Best goalkeeper: Anisur Rahman Zico (11 Clean Sheets) (Bashundhara Kings )
- Biggest home win: Mohammedan SC 6–0 AFC Uttara (7 July 2023)
- Biggest away win: AFC Uttara 0–7 Dhaka Abahani (24 February 2023); AFC Uttara 0–7 Bangladesh Police FC (20 May 2023)
- Highest scoring: Sheikh Russel KC 4–6 Bashundhara Kings (26 May 2023)
- Longest winning run: 10 matches Bashundhara Kings
- Longest unbeaten run: 14 matches Bashundhara Kings
- Longest winless run: 20 matches AFC Uttara
- Longest losing run: 5 matches AFC Uttara; Muktijoddha Sangsad KC
- Highest attendance: 12,125 Bashundhara Kings 1-0 Dhaka Abahani (14 July 2023)

The 2022–23 Bangladesh Premier League was the 15th season of the Bangladesh Premier League since its establishment in 2007. The league was contested by 11 teams including AFC Uttara and Fortis FC, who joined as the promoted clubs from the 2021–22 Championship League. The season started on 9 December 2022 and concluded on 22 July 2023.

Defending champions Bashundhara Kings won their four title in a row, making them the first-ever team to win four successive title in the country. They secured the title beating Sheikh Russel KC in the highest scoring match of the season with three matches to spare.

== Rule changes from last season ==
- A club can sign maximum of five foreigners including at least one player who hails from an AFC affiliated nation. However the AFC "3+1" foreign players rule (three players of any nationality and one from an AFC MA) will be in effect during the match.

== Teams ==
Eleven teams are competing in the league – the top nine teams from the previous season and the two teams promoted from the BCL. The promoted teams are AFC Uttara and Fortis FC, who are new to the top flight. They replaced Swadhinata KS and Uttar Baridhara Club (both teams relegated after just one year back in the top flight).

=== Changes ===
Promoted from 2021–22 BCL	Relegated from 2021–22 BPL
Fortis FC; AFC Uttara	Uttar Baridhara Club Swadhinata KS

- Saif Sporting Club decided to quit from all kinds of football activities from the 2022–23 season due to financial reasons, resulting their exclusion from BPL.

=== Stadiums and locations ===
Locations of the 2022–23 Bangladesh Premier League teams

Team	Location	Stadium	Capacity
AFC Uttara	Mymensingh	Rafiq Uddin Bhuiyan Stadium	25,000
Bangladesh Police FC	Mymensingh	Rafiq Uddin Bhuiyan Stadium	25,000
Bashundhara Kings	Dhaka	Bashundhara Kings Arena	14,000
Chittagong Abahani Ltd.	Munshigonj	Bir Fl. Lt. Matiur Rahman Stadium	10,000
Dhaka Abahani Ltd.	Comilla	Shaheed Dhirendranath Stadium	18,000
Mohammedan SC Ltd.	Comilla	Shaheed Dhirendranath Stadium	18,000
Fortis FC	Rajshahi	Muktijuddho Smriti Stadium	15,000
Lt. Sheikh Jamal Dhanmondi Club Ltd.	Gopalganj	Sheikh Fazlul Haque Mani Stadium	5,000
Muktijoddha Sangsad KC	Gopalganj	Sheikh Fazlul Haque Mani Stadium	5,000
Rahmatganj MFS	Munshigonj	Bir Fl. Lt. Matiur Rahman Stadium	10,000
Sheikh Russel KC	Dhaka	Bashundhara Kings Arena	14,000

=== Personnel and kits ===
Team	Head coach	Captain	Kit manufacturer	Shirt sponsor (chest)
AFC Uttara	(Bangladesh) Ali Asgar Nasir	(Bangladesh) Istekharul Alam Shakil		
Bangladesh Police FC	(Romania) Aristică Cioabă	(Bangladesh) Monaem Khan Raju		
Bashundhara Kings	(Spain) Óscar Bruzón	(Bangladesh) Topu Barman	Club manufactured kit	Bashundhara Group
Chittagong Abahani	(Bangladesh) Mahbubul Haque	(Uzbekistan) Shukurali Pulatov		Ignite Battery
Dhaka Abahani	(Portugal) Mário Lemos	(Brazil) Raphael Augusto		
Mohammedan SC	(Bangladesh) Alfaz Ahmed (interim)	(Mali) Souleymane Diabate		Max Group
Fortis FC	(Bangladesh) Masud Parvez Kaiser	(Brazil) Danilo Quipapá		TORR Limited
Sheikh Jamal DC	(Bangladesh) Maruful Haque	(Bangladesh) Raihan Hasan		Bashundhara Tissue
Muktijoddha Sangsad KC	(Malaysia) Raja Isa	(Bangladesh) Aminur Rahman Sajib		
Rahmatganj MFS	(Bangladesh) Kamal Babu	(Uzbekistan) Shokhrukhbek Kholmatov		Tiger Cement
Sheikh Russel KC	(Bangladesh) Zulfiker Mahmud Mintu	(Bangladesh) Jamal Bhuyan		Bashundhara Cement

=== Coaching changes ===
Team	Outgoing coach	Manner of departure	Date of vacancy	Position in the table	Incoming coach	Date of appointment
AFC Uttara	(Bangladesh) Monowar Hossain Moyna	Demoted to an assistant coach role	Unknown	Pre-season	(Bangladesh) Ali Asgar Nasir	November 2022
Fortis FC	(Bangladesh) Zahidur Rahman Milon Molla	Contract expired	September 2022	Pre-season	(Bangladesh) Masud Parvez Kaisar	October 2022
Chittagong Abahani	(Bangladesh) Maruful Haque	Signed by Sheikh Jamal DC	October 2022	Pre-season	(Bangladesh) Saiful Bari Titu	November 2022
Rahmatganj MFS	(Bangladesh) Syed Golam Jilani	Signed by Bashundhara Kings Women	October 2022	Pre-season	(Bangladesh) Kamal Babu	October 2022
Sheikh Jamal DC	(Nigeria) Joseph Afusi	Contract expired	October 2022	Pre-season	(Bangladesh) Maruful Haque	October 2022
Chittagong Abahani	(Bangladesh) Saiful Bari Titu	Sacked	12 February 2023	10th	(Bangladesh) Mahbubul Haque	12 February 2023
Mohammedan SC	(Bangladesh) Shafiqul Islam Manik	Sacked	6 March 2023	6th	(Bangladesh) Alfaz Ahmed (interim)	6 March 2023

== Foreign players ==
Other foreign players.
AFC quota players.
No foreign player registered.

Bold names refer to players who have senior international cap(s) for their respective nations.

Note :
(substituted off) : players who released during winter transfer window;
(substituted on) : players who registered during winter transfer window.

Club	Leg	Player 1	Player 2	Player 3	Player 4	Player 5
AFC Uttara	First	(Angola) Nzau Miguel Lutumba (substituted off)	(Colombia) José Luis Mosquera (substituted off)	(Japan) Reo Nakamura (substituted off)	(Kyrgyzstan) Sultanbek Momunov	(Nigeria) Lukman Adefemi (substituted off)
AFC Uttara	Second	(Colombia) Richard Maturana (substituted on)	(Guinea) Younoussa Camara (substituted on)	(Russia) Alan Koroyev (substituted on)		
Bangladesh Police FC	First	(Colombia) Mateo Palacios	(Iran) Behnam Habibi (substituted off)	(Kyrgyzstan) Almazbek Malikov	(Panama) Jose Alexander Hernandez (substituted off)	(Venezuela) Edward Morillo
Bangladesh Police FC	Second		(Colombia) Johan Arango (substituted on)		(Uzbekistan) Solibek Karimov (substituted on)	
Bashundhara Kings	First	(Brazil) Dorielton	(Brazil) Miguel Figueira	(Brazil) Robinho	(Iran) Reza Khanzadeh	(Uzbekistan) Asror Gofurov
Bashundhara Kings	Second					
Chittagong Abahani	First	(Ivory Coast) Yacouba Bamba (substituted off)	(Nigeria) Candy Augustine	(Nigeria) Ojukwu David Ifegwu	(Uzbekistan) Shukurali Pulatov	
Chittagong Abahani	Second	(Egypt) Mostafa Kahraba (substituted on)				
Dhaka Abahani	First	(Brazil) Getterson (substituted off)	(Brazil) Raphael Augusto	(Costa Rica) Daniel Colindres	(Nigeria) Peter Nworah	(Syria) Yousef Mohammad
Dhaka Abahani	Second	(Nigeria) Emeka Ogbugh (substituted on)				
Mohammedan SC	First	(Brazil) Roger Duarte	(Iran) Meysam Shahmakvandzadeh (substituted off)	(Mali) Souleymane Diabate	(Uzbekistan) Muzaffar Muzaffarov	(Venezuela) Daniel Febles
Mohammedan SC	Second		(Nigeria) Sunday Emmanuel (substituted on)			
Fortis FC	First	(Afghanistan) Amredin Sharifi	(Brazil) Danilo Quipapá	(Brazil) Luiz Júnior (substituted off)	(Brazil) Thiago Bonfim (substituted off)	
Fortis FC	Second			(The Gambia) Gaira Joof (substituted on)	(The Gambia) Pa Omar Babou (substituted on)	
Lt. Sheikh Jamal Dhanmondi Club Ltd.	First	(The Gambia) Sulayman Sillah	(Paraguay) Jorge Aguilar	(Uzbekistan) Nodir Mavlonov	(Uzbekistan) Otabek Valizhonov	(Saint Vincent and the Grenadines) Cornelius Stewart
Lt. Sheikh Jamal Dhanmondi Club Ltd.	Second					
Muktijoddha Sangsad KC	First	(Burundi) Landry Ndikumana	(Japan) Soma Otani	(Nigeria) Adeyinka Najeem	(Nigeria) Emmanuel Uzochukwu	(Zimbabwe) Jimmy Dzingai
Muktijoddha Sangsad KC	Second					
Rahmatganj MFS	First	(Colombia) Jhoaho Rivelino Hinestroza (substituted off)	(Brazil) Igor Cesar Rodrigues Santana (substituted off)	(Brazil) Michael (substituted off)	(Tajikistan) Fatkhullo Fatkhulloyev	(Uzbekistan) Shokhrukhbek Kholmatov
Rahmatganj MFS	Second	(Mali) Ulysse Diallo (substituted on)	(Nigeria) Peter Ebimobowei (substituted on)	(Uzbekistan) Bunyod Shodiev (substituted on)		
Sheikh Russel KC	First	(Ivory Coast) Didier Brossou	(Democratic Republic of the Congo) Junior Mapuku (substituted off)	(Nigeria) Mfon Udoh	(Uzbekistan) Timur Talipov	
Sheikh Russel KC	Second		(Nigeria) Kenneth Ikechukwu (substituted on)			(Australia) Andrew Marveggio (substituted on)

== League table ==
Pos	Team	Pld	W	D	L	GF	GA	GD	Pts	Qualification or relegation
1	Bashundhara Kings (C, Q)	20	18	1	1	51	13	+38	55	Qualification for the AFC Challenge League play-off round
2	Dhaka Abahani	20	12	4	4	45	18	+27	40	
3	Bangladesh Police FC	20	10	5	5	39	21	+18	35	
4	Mohammedan SC	20	9	5	6	38	21	+17	32	
5	Sheikh Russel KC	20	8	6	6	33	30	+3	30	
6	Sheikh Jamal DC	20	5	9	6	25	32	−7	24	
7	Fortis FC	20	5	8	7	23	25	−2	23	
8	Chittagong Abahani	20	4	9	7	26	35	−9	21	
9	Rahmatganj MFS	20	4	7	9	15	31	−16	19	
10	Muktijoddha Sangsad KC (R)	20	4	3	13	19	42	−23	15	Relegation to Championship League
11	AFC Uttara (R)	20	0	5	15	10	56	−46	5	Relegation to Championship League

Source: Soccerway
Rules for classification: 1) Points; 2) Goal difference; 3) Goals scored.
(C) Champion; (Q) Qualify for the AFC competition; (R) Relegated

== Results ==
=== Results table ===
Home \ Away	AFCU	BK	BPFC	CAL	DAL	FFC	MSC	MUK	RAH	SJDC	SRKC
AFC Uttara	—	1–1	0–7	1–1	0–7	0–1	0–6	0–1	2–3	1–3	1–1
Bashundhara Kings	3–0	—	1–0	2–0	1–0	4–1	2–1	4–0	2–0	3–0	3–1
Police FC	4–0	2–1	—	1–1	0–0	4–2	0–0	6–1	2–0	1–2	1–3
Ctg Abahani	1–0	0–3	2–3	—	3–2	0–0	1–2	2–0	2–2	1–1	2–4
Dhaka Abahani	1–0	1–2	4–1	5–1	—	1–1	2–0	3–2	4–0	3–0	3–1
Fortis FC	4–0	0–2	1–1	1–1	0–2	—	0–1	2–0	0–0	1–1	0–1
Mohammedan	6–0	0–1	1–1	2–2	1–1	3–4	—	2–0	3–1	1–1	1–2
Muktijoddha	1–1	1–3	0–1	1–2	1–0	1–1	1–6	—	1–2	2–3	1–0
Rahmatganj	1–0	0–4	0–2	1–0	1–2	1–1	0–1	0–2	—	0–0	0–0
Sheikh Jamal	3–3	1–3	1–0	2–2	1–2	0–3	0–1	1–1	2–2	—	3–2
Sheikh Russel	1–0	6–4	1–2	2–2	2–2	2–0	2–0	3–2	1–1	0–0	—

Source: Soccerway
Legend: Blue = home team win; Yellow = draw; Red = away team win.

=== Positions by round ===
The following table lists the positions of teams after each week of matches. In order to preserve the chronological evolution, any postponed matches are not included to the round at which they were originally scheduled but added to the full round they were played immediately afterward.

Team ╲ Round	1	2	3	4	5	6	7	8	9	10	11	12	13	14	15	16	17	18	19	20	21	22
AFC Uttara	11	11	11	10	11	11	11	11	11	11	11	11	11	11	11	11	11	11	11	11	11	11
Police FC	3	5	5	6	6	4	4	3	3	3	3	4	4	6	6	5	3	3	3	3	3	3
Bashundhara Kings	1	1	1	1	1	1	1	1	1	1	1	1	1	1	1	1	1	1	1	1	1	1
Ctg Abahani	8	9	8	9	10	10	10	10	10	10	10	10	10	10	10	10	10	9	8	8	7	8
Dhaka Abahani	6	4	2	3	2	2	2	2	2	2	2	2	2	2	2	2	2	2	2	2	2	2
Fortis FC	7	8	6	7	7	7	6	6	7	6	7	7	7	7	7	7	7	7	7	7	8	7
Mohammedan	2	2	4	5	5	6	8	8	6	7	6	5	5	3	5	6	4	4	4	4	4	4
Muktijoddha	10	10	10	11	9	9	7	7	9	9	8	8	8	8	8	8	8	10	10	10	10	10
Rahmatganj	4	7	9	8	8	8	9	9	8	8	9	9	9	9	9	9	9	8	9	9	9	9
Sheikh Jamal	5	3	3	2	3	3	3	4	5	5	5	6	6	4	4	4	6	6	6	6	6	6
Sheikh Russel	9	6	7	4	4	5	5	5	4	4	4	3	3	5	3	3	5	5	5	5	5	5

Leader
Runners-up
Relegation to BCL

Source: Soccerway

=== Results by games ===
Team ╲ Round	1	2	3	4	5	6	7	8	9	10	11	12	13	14	15	16	17	18	19	20	21	22
AFC Uttara	L	–	L	L	L	L	D	L	L	D	L	D	–	L	L	D	L	L	D	L	L	L
Police FC	W	D	L	D	L	W	D	W	W	–	D	L	D	L	L	W	W	W	W	W	-	W
Bashundhara Kings	W	W	W	W	W	W	W	W	W	W	–	D	W	W	W	L	W	W	W	W	W	-
Ctg Abahani	–	L	D	D	L	L	D	D	L	W	D	–	D	L	D	W	L	W	D	D	W	L
Dhaka Abahani	D	W	W	D	W	D	W	W	–	L	W	W	W	L	W	L	W	D	W	–	L	W
Fortis FC	D	L	W	–	D	D	D	D	L	W	D	L	L	W	–	D	W	L	D	L	L	W
Mohammedan	W	D	D	L	–	D	L	L	W	L	W	W	D	W	L	–	W	D	L	W	W	W
Muktijoddha	L	L	L	L	W	D	L	–	L	L	W	L	D	W	L	D	L	L	–	L	L	L
Rahmatganj	D	L	L	W	D	–	W	L	W	L	L	D	L	L	W	D	–	W	L	D	D	L
Sheikh Jamal	D	W	W	D	W	D	–	L	L	D	D	D	D	W	D	D	L	–	L	L	W	L
Sheikh Russel	L	W	–	W	L	D	L	W	W	D	L	W	D	–	W	D	L	L	D	W	D	W

Source: Soccerway
W = Win; D = Draw; L = Lose

== Season statistics ==
=== Goalscorers ===
There were 324 goals scored in 110 matches, for an average of 2.95 goals per match. Source: Soccerway

20 Goals

- (Brazil) Dori (Bashundhara Kings)

16 Goals

- (Mali) Souleymane Diabate (Mohammedan SC)

12 Goals

- (Costa Rica) Daniel Colindres (Dhaka Abahani)

11 Goals

- (Nigeria) Mfon Udoh (Sheikh Russel KC)
- (Saint Vincent and the Grenadines) Cornelius Stewart (Sheikh Jamal DC)

10 Goals

- (Brazil) Robinho Azevedo (Bashundhara Kings)
- (Brazil) Miguel Figueira (Bashundhara Kings)
- (Nigeria) Ojukwu David Ifegwu (Chittagong Abahani)

9 Goals

- (Venezuela) Edward Morillo (Bangladesh Police FC)

8 Goals

- (Bangladesh) Eleta Kingsley (Dhaka Abahani)

7 Goals

- (Colombia) Johan Arango (Bangladesh Police FC)
- (Nigeria) Emmanuel Uzochukwu (Muktijoddha Sangsad KC)

5 Goals

- (The Gambia) Gaira Joof (Fortis FC)
- (Ivory Coast) Jean Didier Brossou (Sheikh Russel KC)
- (Bangladesh) Ekbal Hussain (Chittagong Abahani)
- (Bangladesh) Nabib Newaj Jibon (Dhaka Abahani)
- (Nigeria) Sunday Emmanuel (Mohammedan SC)
- (Nigeria) Kenneth Ikechukwu (Sheikh Russel KC)
- (Burundi) Landry Ndikumana (Muktijoddha Sangsad KC)

4 Goals

- (Bangladesh) Foysal Ahmed Fahim (Dhaka Abahani)
- (Bangladesh) Rakib Hossain (Bashundhara Kings)
- (Bangladesh) Shakhawat Hossain Rony (Fortis FC)
- (Uzbekistan) Muzaffar Muzaffarov ( Mohammedan SC)
- (Afghanistan) Amredin Sharifi (Fortis FC)
- Rabiul Hasan (Bangladesh Police FC)
- (Colombia) Mateo Palacios (Bangladesh Police FC)
- Mohammed Abdullah (Bangladesh Police FC)
- (Nigeria) Peter Ebimobowei (Rahmatganj MFS)

3 Goals

- (Nigeria) Peter Nworah (Dhaka Abahani)
- (Uzbekistan) Asror Gafurov (Bashundhara Kings)
- (Uzbekistan) Otabek Valizhonov (Sheikh Jamal DC)
- (Bangladesh) Sazzad Hossain (Mohammedan SC)
- (Colombia) Richard Maturana (AFC Uttara)
- (Nigeria) Emeka Ogbugh (Dhaka Abahani)
- (Bangladesh) Shahriar Emon (Mohammedan SC)
- (Uzbekistan) Nodir Mavlonov (Sheikh Jamal DC)
- (Bangladesh) Arif Hossain (Mohammedan SC)
- (Bangladesh) Dipok Roy (Sheikh Russel KC)

2 Goals

- (Bangladesh) Aminur Rahman Sajib (Muktijoddha Sangsad KC)
- (Bangladesh) Kawshik Barua (Sheikh Jamal DC)
- (Brazil) Michael Vinícius (Rahmatganj MFS)
- (Ivory Coast) Yacouba Bamba (Chittagong Abahani)
- (Nigeria) Adeyinka Najeem (Muktijoddha Sangsad KC)
- (Panama) Jose Alexander Hernandez (Bangladesh Police FC)
- (Venezuela) Daniel Febles (Mohammedan SC)
- (Kyrgyzstan) Sultanbek Momunov (AFC Uttara)
- (Brazil) Danilo Quipapá (Fortis FC)
- (Democratic Republic of the Congo) Junior Mapuku (Sheikh Russel KC)
- (Kyrgyzstan) Almazbek Malikov (Bangladesh Police FC)
- (Brazil) Raphael Augusto (Dhaka Abahani)
- (The Gambia) Sulayman Sillah (Sheikh Jamal DC)
- (Bangladesh) Sakib Bepari (AFC Uttara)
- (Syria) Yousef Mohammad (Dhaka Abahani)
- (Mali) Ulysse Diallo (Rahmatganj MFS)
- (Bangladesh) Emtiyaz Raihan (Chittagong Abahani)
- MS Bablu (Bangladesh Police FC)
- Shahed Miah (Bangladesh Police FC)
- (Bangladesh) Mannaf Rabby (Sheikh Jamal DC)
- (Bangladesh) Mohammad Ibrahim (Sheikh Russel KC)

1 Goal

- (Bangladesh) Shahin Ahammad (Fortis FC)
- (Bangladesh) Mojibur Rahman Jony (Fortis FC)
- (Bangladesh) Borhan Uddin (Fortis FC)
- (Bangladesh) Enamul Islam Gazi (Rahmatganj MFS)
- (Bangladesh) Minhajul Abedin Ballu (Mohammedan SC)
- (Bangladesh) Maraz Hossain Opi (Dhaka Abahani)
- (Brazil) Luiz Júnior (Fortis FC)
- (Bangladesh) Riyadul Hasan Rafi (Dhaka Abahani)
- (Bangladesh) Mohamed Iftekhar Munna (Rahmatganj MFS)
- (Japan) Soma Otani (Muktijoddha Sangsad KC)
- (Bangladesh) Rezaul Karim Reza (Dhaka Abahani)
- (Bangladesh) Yeasin Khan (Sheikh Russel KC)
- (Bangladesh) Nasiruddin Chowdhury (Chittagong Abahani)
- (Bangladesh) Manik Hossain Molla (Mohammedan SC)
- (Bangladesh) Motin Mia (Bashundhara Kings)
- (Colombia) Jhoaho Hinestroza (Rahmatganj MFS)
- (Bangladesh) Mehedi Hasan Royal (Dhaka Abahani)
- (Uzbekistan) Timur Talipov (Sheikh Russel KC)
- (Bangladesh) Obidur Rahman Nawbab (Sheikh Jamal DC)
- (Bangladesh) Rohit Sarkar (AFC Uttara)
- (Bangladesh) Sarower Zaman Nipu (AFC Uttara)
- (Bangladesh) Yeasin Arafat (Bashundhara Kings)
- (Bangladesh) Md Taj Uddin (Muktijoddha Sangsad KC)
- (Uzbekistan) Shokhrukhbek Kholmatov (Rahmatganj MFS)
- (Uzbekistan) Shukurali Pulatov (Chittagong Abahani)
- (Bangladesh) Nihat Jaman Ucchash (Sheikh Russel KC)
- (Bangladesh) Mohamed Atikuzzaman (Muktijoddha Sangsad KC)
- (Bangladesh) Faisal Ahmed Shitol (Sheikh Russel KC)
- (Bangladesh) Forhad Mona (Chittagong Abahani)
- (Egypt) Mostafa Kahraba (Chittagong Abahani)
- (Bangladesh) Mohamed Tarak (Chittagong Abahani)
- (The Gambia) Pa Omar Babou (Fortis FC)
- (Bangladesh) Mohamed Sohel Rana (Dhaka Abahani)
- Zillur Rahman (Bangladesh Police FC)
- (Bangladesh) Samin Yasir Juel (Rahmatganj MFS)
- Syed Shah Quazem Kirmane (Bangladesh Police FC)
- (Bangladesh) Mohammed Mozzamel Hossain Nira (Fortis FC)
- (Bangladesh) Shekh Morsalin (Bashundhara Kings)
- (Bangladesh) Sujon Biswas (Sheikh Russel KC)
- (Bangladesh) Abu Shaeid (Sheikh Jamal DC)
- (Bangladesh) Sanowar Hossain (Mohammedan SC)
- Joyonto Kumar Roy (Bangladesh Police FC)
- (Bangladesh) Naim Uddin Noyon (AFC Uttara)
- (Bangladesh) Anik Hossain (Chittagong Abahani)
- (Bangladesh) Khondoker Ashraful Islam (Rahmatganj MFS)
- (Bangladesh) Jahedul Alam (Fortis FC)
- (Bangladesh) Joynal Abedin Dipu (Fortis FC)
- (Bangladesh) Md Emon Hossain (Rahmatganj MFS)
- (Bangladesh) Mohammad Nahian (Chittagong Abahani)

=== Top Bangladeshi scorers ===
Rank	Player	Club	Goals
1	Eleta Kingsley	Dhaka Abahani	8
2	Ekbal Hossain	Chittagong Abahani	5
2	Nabib Newaj Jibon	Dhaka Abahani	5
3	Rakib Hossain	Bashundhara Kings	4
3	Foysal Ahmed Fahim	Dhaka Abahani	4
3	Shakhawat Hossain Rony	Fortis FC	4
3	Rabiul Hasan	Bangladesh Police FC	4
3	Mohammed Abdullah	Bangladesh Police FC	4

=== Own goals ===
† Bold Club indicates winner of the match

Player	Club	Opponent	Result	Date
(Bangladesh) Ariful Islam Jitu	Fortis FC	Bashundhara Kings	0–2	23 December 2022

=== Hat-tricks ===
Player	For	Against	Result	Date	Ref
(Mali) Souleymane Diabate	Mohammedan SC	AFC Uttara	0–6 (A)	10 February 2023	
(Bangladesh) Foysal Ahmed Fahim	Dhaka Abahani	AFC Uttara	0–7 (A)	24 February 2023	
(Bangladesh) Eleta Kingsley	Dhaka Abahani	AFC Uttara	0–7 (A)	24 February 2023	
(Mali) Souleymane Diabate	Mohammedan SC	Muktijoddha Sangsad KC	1–6 (A)	8 April 2023	
(Costa Rica) Daniel Colindres	Dhaka Abahani	Rahmatganj MFS	0–4 (H)	14 April 2023	
(Brazil) Dorielton ^{4}	Bashundhara Kings	Sheikh Russel KC	4–6 (H)	26 May 2023	
(Mali) Souleymane Diabate	Mohammedan SC	AFC Uttara	6–0 (H)	7 July 2023	

=== Most goal contributions ===
Rank	Player	Club	Goals	Assists	Total
1	(Brazil) Robinho	Bashundhara Kings	10	12	22
2	(Brazil) Dorielton Gomes	Bashundhara Kings	20	1	21
2	(Mali) Souleymane Diabate	Mohammedan SC	16	5	21
4	(Costa Rica) Daniel Colindres	Dhaka Abahani	12	7	19
4	(Brazil) Miguel Figueira	Bashundhara Kings	10	9	19
6	(Venezuela) Edward Morillo	Bangladesh Police FC	9	8	17
7	(Nigeria) Mfon Udoh	Sheikh Russel KC	11	5	16
8	(Saint Vincent and the Grenadines) Cornelius Stewart	Sheikh Jamal DC	11	3	14
9	(Nigeria) Ojukwu David Ifegwu	Chittagong Abahani	10	2	12
9	(Colombia) Johan Arango	Bangladesh Police FC	7	5	12

=== Clean sheets ===
Rank	Player	Club	Matches	Clean sheets
1	(Bangladesh) Anisur Rahman Zico	Bashundhara Kings	17	11
2	(Bangladesh) Sujon Hossain	Mohammedan SC	16	7
3	(Bangladesh) Rakibul Hasan Tushar	Police FC	11	6
4	(Bangladesh) Shahidul Alam Sohel	Dhaka Abahani	17	6
5	(Bangladesh) Mitul Marma	Fortis FC	15	4
5	(Bangladesh) Mehedi Hasan Srabon	Muktijoddha Sangsad KC	16	4
5	(Bangladesh) Ashraful Islam Rana	Sheikh Russel KC	16	4

=== Discipline ===
==== Player ====
- Most yellow cards: 7
  - (Uzbekistan) Otabek Valijonov (Sheikh Jamal DC)
- Most red cards: 1 (12 players)

==== Club ====
- Yellow cards:

Rank	Club	Yellow cards
1	Bashundhara Kings	42
2	Police FC	41
3	Chittagong Abahani	38
4	Sheikh Jamal DC	34
5	Mohammedan SC	33
5	AFC Uttara	33
7	Fortis FC	30
8	Rahmatganj MFS	29
9	Dhaka Abahani	27
9	Muktijoddha Sangsad KC	27
9	Sheikh Russel KC	27

- Red cards:

Rank	Club	Red cards
1	Chittagong Abahani	3
2	Sheikh Jamal DC	2
3	AFC Uttara	1
3	Bashundhara Kings	1
3	Dhaka Abahani	1
3	Rahmatganj MFS	1
3	Fortis FC	1
3	Police FC	1
3	Mohammedan SC	1

== See also ==
- AFC Champions League
- 2024–25 AFC Champions League Two
- 2022–23 Federation Cup (Bangladesh)
- 2022–23 Independence Cup (Bangladesh)
- 2022–23 Bangladesh Championship League
- 2021–22 Bangladesh Women's Football League
- 2021–22 BFF U-18 Football League
- 2021-22 BFF U-16 Football Tournament
