= Asadul Islam Sakib =

Bangladeshi footballer (born 2005)

Personal information
- Full name: Asadul Islam Sakib
- Date of birth: 29 July 2005 (age 21)
- Place of birth: Barisal, Bangladesh
- Positions: Full-back; left winger

Team information
- Current team: Chattogram City
- Number: 29

Senior career*
| Years | Team | Apps | (Gls) |
| 2020–2021 | Uttara | 21 | (5) |
| 2021–2022 | Uttar Baridhara | 21 | (1) |
| 2022–2023 | Uttara | 20 | (2) |
| 2023–2024 | Chittagong Abahani | 16 | (0) |
| 2024–2026 | Bangladesh Police | 15 | (0) |
| 2026– | Chattogram City | 0 | (0) |

International career^{‡}
| 2022–2024 | Bangladesh U20 | 11 | (0) |
Medal record
Men's football
Representing Bangladesh
SAFF U-20 Championship
| Winner | 2024 Nepal | Team |
- * Club domestic league appearances and goals as of 23 May 2026 ‡ National team caps and goals as of 29 September 2024

Asadul Islam Sakib (Bengali: আসাদুল ইসলাম সাকিব; born 29 July 2005) is a Bangladeshi professional footballer who plays either as a full-back or winger for Bangladesh Football League club Chattogram City.

== Early career ==
Asadul Islam Sakib was born in Barisal, Bangladesh. Sakib spent much of his early career at BKSP. He represented Barisal Division at the 2020 U-17 Bangabandhu Gold Cup in 2020. He was an integral part of the team which defeated Chittagong Division 2–1 in the tournament final. His performances during the tournament caught the eye of coach Abdur Razzak, who facilitated his move to Bangladesh Championship League club Uttara FC.

== Club career ==
Sakib began his professional football career with Uttara FC in the second-tier of Bangladesh, the Bangladesh Championship League, from the 2020–21 season. On 14 March 2021, he scored his first professional goal against Kawran Bazar Pragati Sangha in a 1–3 defeat. Sakib also scored in the following match, on 24 March, in a 4–1 victory over Farashganj SC. He finished his first professional season with 5 goals from 21 appearances.

In November 2021, Sakib joined Bangladesh Premier League club, Uttar Baridhara. He scored his first top-tier goal in a 3–5 defeat to Sheikh Russel KC on 3 July 2022. He finished his first season in the top-tier with 1 goal from 21 appearances, as his club were relegated to the Championship League.

== International career ==
Sakib represented the Bangladesh U20 team at the 2023 AFC U-20 Asian Cup qualifiers held in Arad, Bahrain. He made three substitute appearances in the qualifiers, as Bangladesh failed to qualify by finishing third in the five team group. He was also part of the team which lifted the 2024 SAFF U-20 Championship in Nepal. Sakib remained in the team for the 2025 AFC U-20 Asian Cup qualifiers, during which he scored an own goal against Bhutan U20.

== Personal life ==
Sakib's older brother, Rakib Hossain, is also a professional footballer.

== Career statistics ==
=== Club ===
As of 28 December 2024.

Appearances and goals by club, season and competition
| Club | Season | League | | | Domestic Cup (Note: Appearance(s) in Bangladesh Federation Cup) | | Other (Note: Appearance(s) in Bangladesh Independence Cup) | | Continental | | Total | |
| Club | Season | Division | Apps | Goals | Apps | Goals | Apps | Goals | Apps | Goals | Apps | Goals |
|---|---|---|---|---|---|---|---|---|---|---|---|---|
| Uttara | 2020–21 | Bangladesh Championship League | 21 | 5 | — | | — | | — | | 21 | 5 |
| Uttar Baridhara | 2021–22 | Bangladesh Premier League | 21 | 1 | 0 | 0 | 3 | 0 | — | | 24 | 1 |
| Uttara | 2022–23 | Bangladesh Championship League | 20 | 2 | — | | — | | — | | 20 | 2 |
| Chittagong Abahani | 2023–24 | Bangladesh Premier League | 16 | 0 | 2 | 0 | 3 | 0 | — | | 21 | 0 |
| Bangladesh Police | 2024–25 | Bangladesh Premier League | 5 | 0 | 1 | 0 | 0 | 0 | — | | 6 | 0 |
| Career total | | | 83 | 8 | 3 | 0 | 6 | 0 | 0 | 0 | 92 | 8 |

== Honours ==
Bangladesh U-20

- SAFF U-20 Championship: 2024
