= Jayed Ahmed =

Bangladeshi footballer

Personal information
- Full name: Jayed Ahmed
- Date of birth: 14 December 2002 (age 23)
- Place of birth: Golapganj, Sylhet, Bangladesh
- Height: 1.61 m (5 ft 3 1/2 in)
- Positions: Defensive midfielder; right-back

Team information
- Current team: Rahmatganj MFS
- Number: 16

Youth career
- 2018–2019: Saif SC Jr.

Senior career*
Years	Team	Apps	(Gls)
2019–2022	Saif SC	8	(1)
2022–2023	AFC Uttara	18	(0)
2023–2024	Sheikh Jamal DC	10	(0)
2024–2025	Bangladesh Police	5	(0)
2025–	Rahmatganj MFS	0	(0)

International career^{‡}
2023–	Bangladesh U23	5	(0)
2023–	Bangladesh	2	(0)
- * Club domestic league appearances and goals as of 24 May 2025 ‡ National team caps and goals as of 21 March 2024

Jayed Ahmed (Bengali: জায়েদ আহমেদ; born 14 December 2002) is a Bangladeshi professional footballer who plays as a midfielder for Bangladesh Premier League club Rahmatganj MFS and the Bangladesh national team. Due to his versatility, he can operate either as a defensive midfielder, central midfielder, attacking midfielder, wide midfielder or as a right back.

== Club career ==
Jayed began his career with Saif SC Jr. in the 2017–18 Dhaka Third Division League. He was eventually promoted to the senior team for the 2019–20 Bangladesh Premier League. On 3 March 2020, he scored his first professional goal against Muktijoddha Sangsad KC during a 2–0 victory, in what was only his second league appearance.

== International career ==
In 2019, Jayed was invited to participate in training sessions with the Bangladesh U19 football team. Despite this early recognition of his potential, he was not included in the final squad.

Jayed represented the Bangladesh U23 team in both the 2024 AFC U-23 Asian Cup qualifiers and the 2022 Asian Games.

On 14 November 2023, he made his debut for the Bangladesh national team during a 1–1 draw with Maldives in the 2026 FIFA World Cup qualification – AFC first round.

On February 26, 2024, Jayed, along with a few of his teammates, was spotted playing in a local tournament in Sylhet, although he was scheduled to report to the national team the following day for 2026 FIFA World Cup qualification – AFC second round preparation, drawing criticism from local news outlets.

== Career statistics ==
=== Club ===
As of 14 November 2023.

Appearances and goals by club, season and competition
Club	Season	League			Domestic Cup (Note: Appearance(s) in Bangladesh Federation Cup)		Other (Note: Appearance(s) in Bangladesh Independence Cup)		Continental		Total	
Club	Season	Division	Apps	Goals	Apps	Goals	Apps	Goals	Apps	Goals	Apps	Goals
Saif SC	2019–20	Bangladesh Premier League	3	1	0	0	—		—		3	1
Saif SC	2020–21	Bangladesh Premier League	3	0	0	0	—		—		3	0
Saif SC	2021–22	Bangladesh Premier League	2	0	0	0	0	0	—		2	0
Saif SC	Saif SC total		8	1	0	0	0	0	0	0	8	1
AFC Uttara	2023–24	Bangladesh Premier League	18	0	2	0	2	0	—		22	0
Sheikh Jamal DC	2023–24	Bangladesh Premier League	0	0	0	0	2	0	—		2	0
Career total			26	1	2	0	4	0	0	0	32	1

=== International ===
As of 21 March 2024.

Bangladesh national team
Year	Apps	Goals
2023	1	0
2024	1	0
Total	2	0
