= Mohamed Sohel Rana (footballer, born 1991) =

Bangladeshi footballer

Sohel Rana
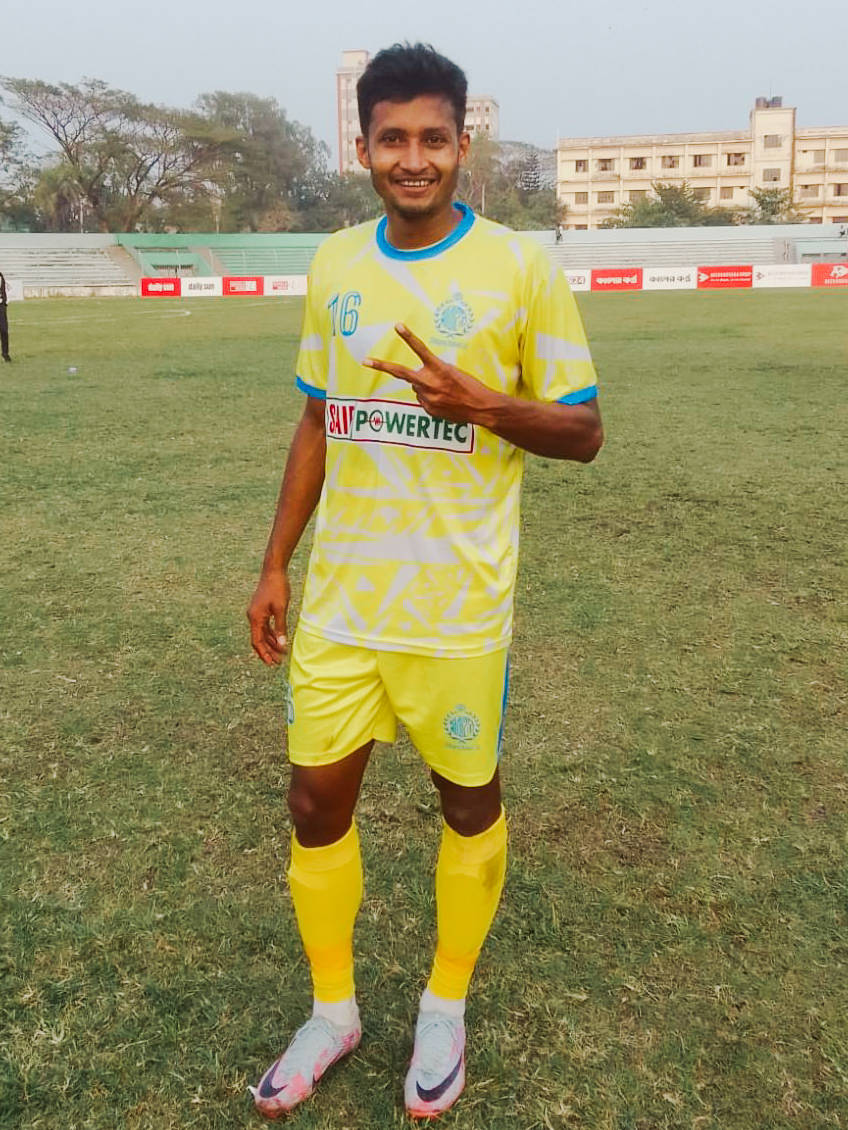
- Sohel with Chittagong Abahani in 2024

Personal information
- Full name: Mohamed Sohel Rana
- Date of birth: 13 December 1991 (age 34)
- Place of birth: Manikganj, Bangladesh
- Height: 1.78 m (5 ft 10 in)
- Position: Defensive midfielder

Team information
- Current team: Dhaka Wanderers
- Number: 8

Senior career*
| Years | Team | Apps | (Gls) |
| 2010–2011 | Feni | ? | (2) |
| 2011–2013 | Sheikh Jamal | ? | (0) |
| 2013–2014 | Brothers Union | ? | (0) |
| 2014–2015 | Mohammedan | ? | (0) |
| 2015–2016 | Muktijoddha | 20 | (1) |
| 2016–2018 | Chittagong Abahani | 20 | (0) |
| 2018–2019 | Sheikh Russel | 22 | (1) |
| 2018 | → Saif (loan) | 0 | (0) |
| 2019–2022 | Dhaka Abahani | 39 | (2) |
| 2022–2023 | Sheikh Russel | 11 | (0) |
| 2023–2024 | Chittagong Abahani | 11 | (1) |
| 2024–2025 | Brothers Union | 12 | (0) |
| 2026– | Dhaka Wanderers | 0 | (0) |
- * Club domestic league appearances and goals as of 23 May 2025

Mohamed Sohel Rana (Bengali: মোহাম্মদ সোহেল রানা; born 13 December 1991) is a Bangladeshi professional footballer who plays as a midfielder. He last played for Bangladesh Championship League club Dhaka Wanderers.

== Club career ==
=== Muktijoddha Sangsad KC ===
On 24 November 2016, Sohel's free kick goal from 30 yards earned the financially struggling Muktijoddha Sangsad KC a crucial win against his former club Mohammedan SC during the 2016 Bangladesh Premier League.

=== Abahani Limited Dhaka ===
On 23 February 2022, Sohel scored the winning goal for Abahani Limited Dhaka in the Dhaka Derby. He dedicated his long-range strike to his late wife and son, who were both killed in a traffic collision in 2018.

== International career ==
Sohel was called up to the Bangladesh national football team for the 2022 FIFA World Cup qualifiers by head coach at the time Jamie Day. However, he was not able to make a single appearance during the qualifiers.

== Personal life ==
On 24 November 2018, while Sohel was returning to Dhaka from his house in Manikganj with his family to join Sheikh Russel KC for the upcoming 2017–18 Independence Cup, a speeding truck crashed into his motorcycle. The collision killed his wife Arfin Akter Jhuma, and four-year-old son Abdullah on the spot, while Sohel himself sustained serious injuries.

== Honours ==
Sheikh Jamal Dhanmondi Club

- Federation Cup: 2011–12

Chittagong Abahani Limited

- Independence Cup: 2016

Abahani Limited Dhaka

- Independence Cup: 2021–22
- Federation Cup: 2021–22
