= Ekbal Hussain =

Bangladeshi footballer (born 1995)

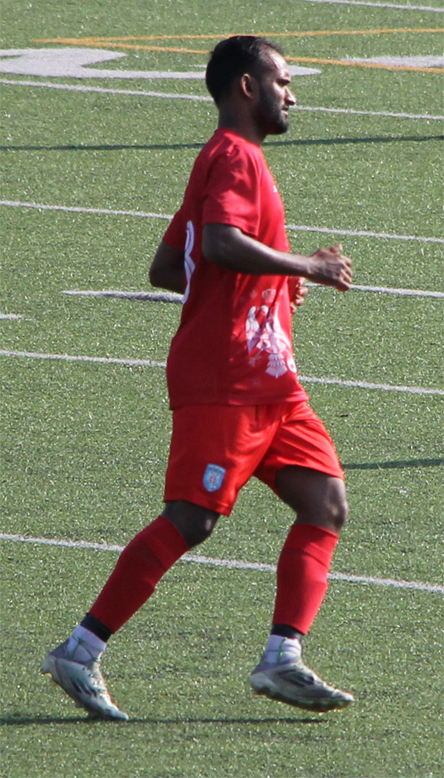
- Hussain in 2025

Personal information
- Full name: Mohamed Ekbal Hussain
- Date of birth: 14 August 1995 (age 31)
- Place of birth: Sylhet, Golapganj, Bangladesh
- Height: 1.70 m (5 ft 7 in)
- Positions: Winger; midfielder

Team information
- Current team: Serbian White Eagles FC

Senior career*
Years	Team	Apps	(Gls)
2017	Agrani Bank SC		(0)
2018–2019	Bangladesh Police		(0)
2020–2021	Fortis	11	(4)
2021–2022	Swadhinata KS	15	(2)
2022–2023	Chittagong Abahani	13	(5)
2023–2025	Sheikh Russel KC	7	(0)
2025–	Serbian White Eagles		
- * Club domestic league appearances and goals

Ekbal Hussain (Bengali: ইকবাল হোসেন; born 14 August 1995) is a Bangladeshi professional footballer who plays as a left-winger or left midfielder for Serbian White Eagles FC in the Canadian Soccer League.

== Club career ==
=== Bangladesh ===
Ekbal caught the attention of coach Abdur Razzak while playing in the Sylhet First Division Football League and was brought to Dhaka, where he joined Agrani Bank Ltd. SC in the Bangladesh Championship League in 2017.

In 2019, Ekbal won the Championship League with Bangladesh Police; however, with limited game time, he remained in the second-tier the following season by joining Fortis FC.

He scored 4 goals in his debut season at Fortis and eventually earned a move to Swadhinata KS in the Bangladesh Premier League.

In 2022, he signed for Chittagong Abahani Limited on a salary of Tk 6 lakh, and although he was absent from the team during much of the first phase of the 2022–23 league season, he scored 5 goals in the second phase to help prevent the club's relegation.

On 25 July 2023, Ekbal confirmed his move to Sheikh Russel KC for the upcoming season, for a salary of Tk 30 lakh.

=== Canada ===
In 2025, he played in the Canadian Soccer League with the Serbian White Eagles. He helped the Serbs secure a playoff berth by finishing second in the standings. In the playoffs, the Serbs qualified for the championship finals, where Scarborough SC defeated them.

== Honours ==
Bangladesh Police

- Bangladesh Championship League: 2018–19

Serbian White Eagles

- CSL Championship runner-up: 2025
- Canadian Soccer League Regular Season runner-up: 2025
