= Shukurali Pulatov =

Uzbek footballer

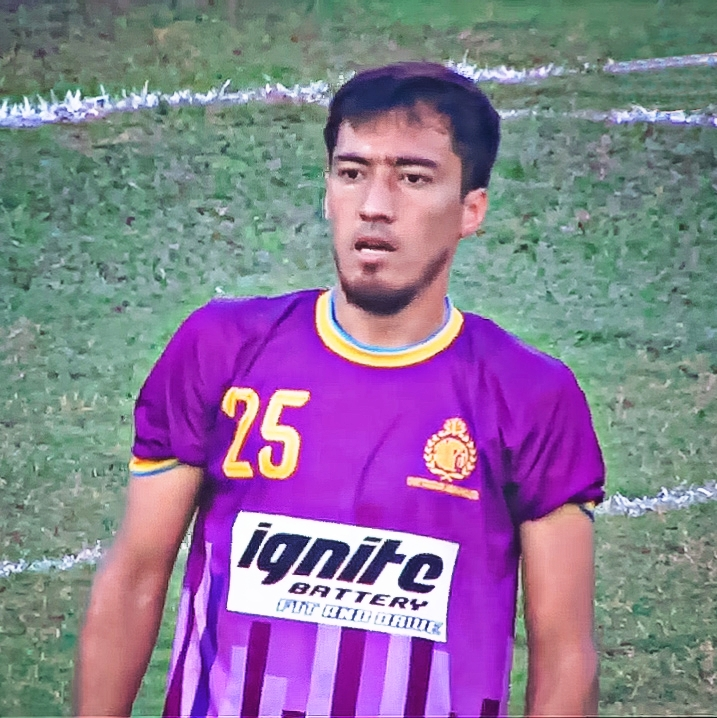
- Pulatov with Chittagong Abahani in 2021

Personal information
- Full name: Shukurali Shukurali Egamberdi oʻgʻli Pulatov
- Date of birth: 23 February 1990 (age 36)
- Place of birth: Margilan, Uzbekistan
- Height: 1.83 m (6 ft 0 in)
- Position: Centre-back

Senior career*
Years	Team	Apps	(Gls)
2010–2014	Neftchi	76	(0)
2014	Navbahor	12	(1)
2014—2015	FC Bunyodkor	6	(0)
2015–2016	Neftchi	53	(7)
2016—2017	Qizilqum	25	(0)
2017—2018	Neftchi	29	(0)
2018—2019	Semen Padang FC	25	(0)
2019–2020	Chittagong Abahani	5	(0)
2020	FC Turon	16	(1)
2020–2021	Chittagong Abahani	15	(0)
2022	Green Streets		
2022–2023	Chittagong Abahani	18	(1)
2024–2025	Chittagong Abahani		
2025–2026	Green Streets		
- * Club domestic league appearances and goals as of 31 July 2026

Shukurali Egamberdi oʻgʻli Pulatov (born 23 February 1990), simply known as Shukurali Pulatov, is an Uzbekistani professional footballer who plays as a centre-back for Uzbekistan Pro League club FC Shurtan Guzar.

He has played in Uzbekistan Super League for more than eight years. He captained Neftchi in 2017–18 season. He also played in Maldives, Bangladesh, Indonesia.

== Honours ==
FC Bunyodkor

- Uzbekistan Cup runner-up: 2014

FC Turon

- Uzbekistan Pro League: 2020
