= Yacouba Nambelesseny Bamba =

Ivorian footballer

Yacouba Bamba
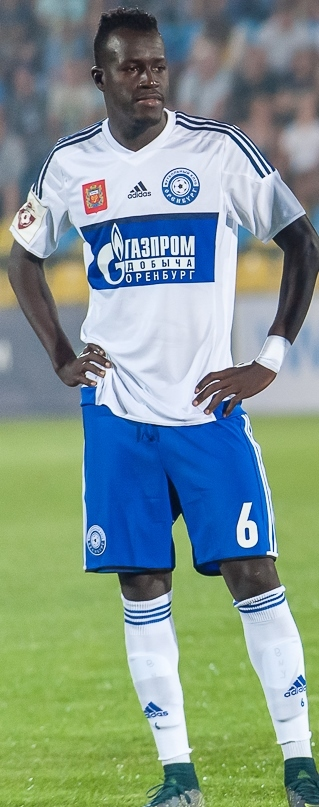
- Bamba with Orenburg in 2016

Personal information
- Full name: Yacouba Nambelesseny Bamba
- Date of birth: 30 November 1991 (age 34)
- Place of birth: Bingerville, Ivory Coast
- Height: 1.80 m (5 ft 11 in)
- Position: Midfielder

Youth career
- Athlétic d'Adjamé

Senior career*
Years	Team	Apps	(Gls)
2011–2013	ASEC Mimosas	27	(0)
2013–2014	AS Denguélé		
2014–2015	Saxan	16	(1)
2015	Slutsk	12	(4)
2016	Zaria Bălți	8	(3)
2016	Orenburg	10	(0)
2019	Slutsk	5	(2)
2020–2021	Kokand 1912	45	(4)
2022	Al-Faisaly	0	(0)
2022–2023	Chittagong Abahani	4	(2)
- * Club domestic league appearances and goals as of 15 February 2023

Yacouba Nambelesseny Bamba (born 30 November 1991) is an Ivorian professional footballer who most recently played for Bangladesh Premier League club Chittagong Abahani as an attacking midfielder.

== Career ==
On 10 February 2022, Al-Faisaly announced the signing of Bamba.

== Family ==
His older brother Fousseni Bamba is also a footballer.
