= Ojukwu David Ifegwu =

Nigerian footballer

David Ifegwu
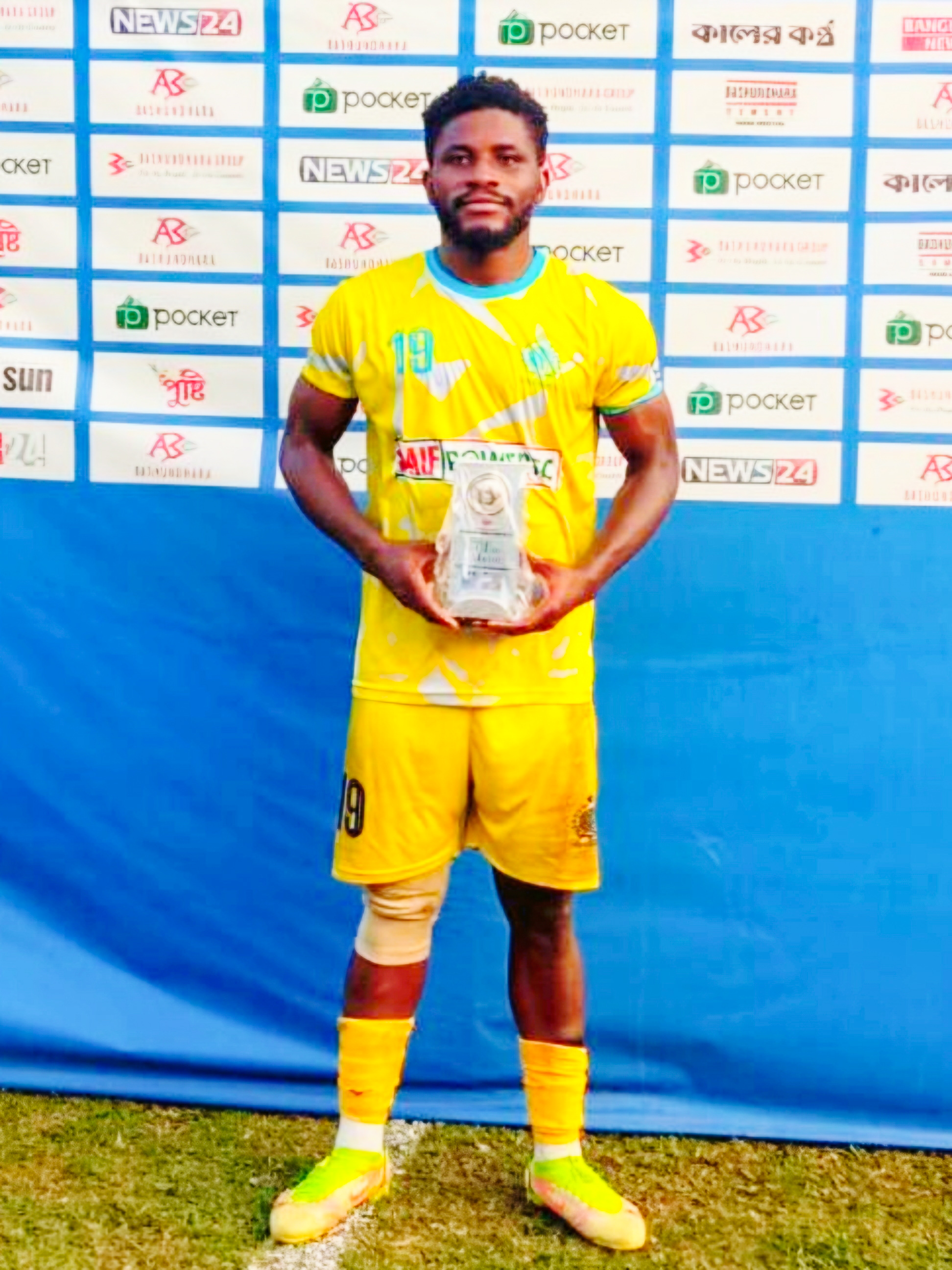
- David with Chittagong Abahani in 2024

Personal information
- Full name: Ojukwu David Ifegwu
- Date of birth: 1 June 1996 (age 30)
- Place of birth: Lagos, Nigeria
- Position: Forward

Team information
- Current team: Chittagong Abahani
- Number: 19

Youth career
- Westerlo Football Academy

Senior career*
| Years | Team | Apps | (Gls) |
| 2015-2016 | Ikorodu United F.C. | | |
| 2016 | Shooting Stars S.C | | |
| 2017 | Enyimba F.C. | 2 | (0) |
| 2018-2020 | Dakkada FC | | |
| 2020–2021 | Enugu Rangers | | |
| 2021 | Sunshine Stars F.C. | | |
| 2021–2022 | Remo Stars F.C. | | |
| 2022– | Chittagong Abahani | 34 | (15) |
- * Club domestic league appearances and goals as of 29 May 2024

Ojukwu David Ifegwu (born 1 June 1996), also spelled as Ifeagwu Ojukwu David, is a Nigerian professional footballer who plays as a forward for Bangladesh Premier League club Fortis FC.

Before coming to Asia, he played in Nigeria Professional Football League, the top flight of Nigerian football. He currently holds the record of fastest goal ever scored in the Bangladesh Premier League.

== Club career ==
=== Early career ===
Graduating from Westerlo Football Academy of his hometown Lagos, Ojukwu started his professional football career in Nigeria Professional Football League, the top-level league of Nigerian football. He played in the league for more than seven years. Starting with Ikorodu United, he played for several top Nigerian clubs.

=== Chittagong Abahani ===
On 23 October 2022, Bangladesh Premier League club Chittagong Abahani announced his signing. It was his first club outside his country. He scored on his debut for the club in a cup match. He scored five goals in the first phase of 2022–23 Bangladesh Premier League and jointly became sixth top scorer along with 2018 FIFA World Cup player Daniel Colindres.

On 12 May 2023, David scored his first brace for the club against Dhaka Abahani, inspiring a crucial win. On 15 July 2023, he scored the fastest goal in Bangladesh Premier League history as he took only fourteen seconds to find the net against Muktijoddha Sangsad KC.

==== Loan to Dhaka Abahani ====
On 1 August 2023, he joined fellow top-tier side Dhaka Abahani on loan for 2023–24 AFC Cup qualifying play-off match. He returned to Chittagong Abahani after the short loan spell which lasted for only a month.
