= 2022–23 Sheikh Russel KC season =

Sheikh Russel KC
2022–23 season
- President: Sayem Sobhan Anvir
- Head coach: Zulfiker Mahmud Mintu
- Stadium: Bashundhara Kings Arena
- Bangladesh Premier League: 5th of 11
- Federation Cup: Third-place
- Independence Cup: Runners-up
- Top goalscorer: League: (Nigeria) Mfon Udoh (11 goals); All: (Nigeria) Mfon Udoh (17 goals)
- Biggest win: 3–0 Vs Dhaka Mohammedan (21 November 2022)
- Biggest defeat: 0-3 Vs Abahani Limited Dhaka (16 May 2023)
| Home colours | Away colours |

The 2022–23 season was Sheikh Russel KC's 28th overall since its establishment in 1995 and their 16th season in the Bangladesh Premier League. In addition to the domestic league, Sheikh Russel participated in the season's edition of the Federation Cup and Independence Cup. The season covered a period from 8 October 2022 to 22 July 2023.

== Players ==
As of 26 March 2023

| No. | Player | Nat. | Position(s) | Date of birth | Year signed | Previous club |
Goalkeepers
| 1 | Ashraful Islam Rana | (Bangladesh) | GK | | 2018 | (Bangladesh) Saif SC |
| 22 | Sarower Jahan | (Bangladesh) | GK | | 2022 | (Bangladesh) Swadhinata KS |
| 28 | Ibrahim Hossain | (Bangladesh) | GK | | 2021 | (Bangladesh) Victoria SC |
| 30 | Sabuj Das Roghu | (Bangladesh) | GK | | 2019 | (Bangladesh) Chittagong Abahani Limited |
Defenders
| 2 | Monir Hossain | (Bangladesh) | RB | | 2022 | (Bangladesh) Abahani Limited Dhaka |
| 3 | Abid Ahmed | (Bangladesh) | LB | | 2022 | (Bangladesh) Saif SC |
| 4 | Yeasin Khan | (Bangladesh) | CB/LB | | 2022 | (Bangladesh) Sheikh Jamal DC |
| 5 | Shawkat Russel | (Bangladesh) | CB | | 2022 | (Bangladesh) Chittagong Abahani Limited |
| 7 | Khalekurzaman Sabuj | (Bangladesh) | LB/RB | | 2017 | (Bangladesh) Uttar Baridhara |
| 18 | Salim Reza | (Bangladesh) | CB | | 2022 | (Bangladesh) Swadhinata KS |
| 23 | Monir Alam | (Bangladesh) | RB | | 2022 | (Bangladesh) Chittagong Abahani Limited |
| 26 | Rabiul Alam | (Bangladesh) | CB | | 2021 | (Bangladesh) BKSP |
| 91 | Timur Talipov | (Uzbekistan) | CB | | 2022 | (Kyrgyzstan) FC Dordoi Bishkek |
Midfielders
| 6 | Jamal Bhuyan | (Bangladesh) | CM/DM | | 2022 | (Bangladesh) Saif SC |
| 9 | Hemanta Vincent Biswas | (Bangladesh) | CM/AM | | 2019 | (Bangladesh) Bashundhara Kings |
| 11 | Andrew Marveggio | (Australia) | MF | 22 April 1992 | 2023 | (Montenegro) FK Jezero |
| 13 | Sujon Biswas | (Bangladesh) | AM/LM | | 2022 | (Bangladesh) Uttar Baridhara |
| 12 | Md Jewel | (Bangladesh) | DM | | 2022 | (Bangladesh) Uttar Baridhara |
| 14 | Maruf Ahamed | (Bangladesh) | DM | | 2022 | (Bangladesh) Uttar Baridhara |
| 16 | Mohamed Sohel Rana | (Bangladesh) | DM | | 2022 | (Bangladesh) Abahani Limited Dhaka |
| 21 | Mohiudeen Mahi | (Bangladesh) | DM/CM | | 2022 | (Bangladesh) Muktijoddha SKC |
| 8 | Kpehi Didier Brossou | (Ivory Coast) | CM | | 2022 | (Bangladesh) Chittagong Abahani Limited |
Forwards
| 10 | Junior Mapuku | (Democratic Republic of the Congo) | CF | | 2022 | (Bulgaria) Slavia Sofia |
| 19 | Mohammad Ibrahim | (Bangladesh) | LW | | 2022 | (Bangladesh) Bashundhara Kings |
| 24 | Dipok Roy | (Bangladesh) | RW/LW | | 2021 | (Bangladesh) Abahani Limited Dhaka |
| 32 | Kenneth Ikechukwu | (Nigeria) | FW | 29 March 1993 | 2023 | (Saudi Arabia) Al-Nahada Club |
| 90 | Mfon Udoh | (Nigeria) | CF | | 2022 | (Bangladesh) Saif SC |
| 99 | Nihat Jaman Ucchash | (Bangladesh) | CF/RW/LW | | 2022 | (Bangladesh) Saif SC |

== Transfer ==
=== In ===
| No. | Pos | Player | Previous club | Fee | Date | Source |
|---|---|---|---|---|---|---|
| 90 | FW | (Nigeria) Mfon Udoh | (Bangladesh) Saif Sporting Club | Free transfer | 3 August 2022 | |
| 99 | FW | (Bangladesh) Nihat Jaman Ucchash | (Bangladesh) Saif Sporting Club | Free transfer | 5 August 2022 | |
| 2 | DF | (Bangladesh) Monir Hossain | (Bangladesh) Abahani Limited Dhaka | Free transfer | 9 August 2022 | |
| 3 | DF | (Bangladesh) Abid Ahmed | (Bangladesh) Saif Sporting Club | Free transfer | 10 August 2022 | |
| 23 | DF | (Bangladesh) Monir Alam | (Bangladesh) Chittagong Abahani Limited | Free transfer | 18 August 2022 | |
| 6 | MF | (Bangladesh) Jamal Bhuyan | (Bangladesh) Saif Sporting Club | Free transfer | 19 October 2022 | |
| 19 | FW | (Bangladesh) Mohammad Ibrahim | (Bangladesh) Bashundhara Kings | Free transfer | 25 October 2022 | |
| 4 | DF | (Bangladesh) Yeasin Khan | (Bangladesh) Sheikh Jamal DC | Free transfer | 26 October 2022 | |
| 91 | DF | (Uzbekistan) Timur Talipov | (Kyrgyzstan) FC Dordoi Bishkek | Free transfer | 30 October 2022 | |
| 5 | DF | (Bangladesh) Shawkat Russel | (Bangladesh) Chittagong Abahani Limited | Free transfer | 7 November 2022 | |
| 14 | MF | (Bangladesh) Md Jewel | (Bangladesh) Uttar Baridhara | Free transfer | 7 November 2022 | |
| 13 | MF | (Bangladesh) Sujon Biswas | (Bangladesh) Uttar Baridhara | Free transfer | 7 November 2022 | |
| 22 | GK | (Bangladesh) Sarower Jahan | (Bangladesh) Swadhinata KS | Free transfer | 7 November 2022 | |
| 18 | DF | (Bangladesh) Salim Reza | (Bangladesh) Swadhinata KS | Free transfer | 7 November 2022 | |
| 21 | MF | (Bangladesh) Mohiudeen Mahi | (Bangladesh) Muktijoddha SKC | Free transfer | 7 November 2022 | |
| 16 | MF | (Bangladesh) Mohamed Sohel Rana | (Bangladesh) Abahani Limited Dhaka | Free transfer | 7 November 2022 | |
| 32 | FW | (Nigeria) Kenneth Ikechukwu | (Saudi Arabia) Al- Nahada Club | Free transfer | 5 March 2023 | |
| – | DF | (Australia) Andrew Marveggio | (Montenegro) FK Mornar | Free transfer | 15 March 2023 | |

=== Out ===
| No. | Pos | Player | Moved to | Fee | Date | Source |
|---|---|---|---|---|---|---|
| 34 | DF | (Kyrgyzstan) Ayzar Akmatov | (Kyrgyzstan) FC Abdysh-Ata Kant | Free transfer | 11 August 2022 | |
| 14 | MF | (Bangladesh) Manik Hossain Molla | (Bangladesh) Dhaka Mohammedan | Free transfer | 15 August 2022 | |
| 3 | DF | (Bangladesh) Rahmat Mia | (Bangladesh) Dhaka Mohammedan | Free transfer | 14 August 2022 | |
| 8 | MF | (Bangladesh) Mohammad Abdullah | (Bangladesh) Sheikh Russel KC | Free transfer | 26 August 2022 | |
| 22 | DF | (Bangladesh) Md Saad Uddin | (Bangladesh) Bashundhara Kings | Free transfer | 26 August 2022 | |
| 4 | DF | (Bangladesh) Assaduzzaman Bablu | (Bangladesh) Abahani Limited Dhaka | Free transfer | 11 October 2022 | |
| 19 | FW | (Bangladesh) Mohammad Jewel | (Bangladesh) Sheikh Jamal DC | Free transfer | 15 October 2022 | |
| 12 | MF | (Bangladesh) Fahim Ahmed | (Bangladesh) AFC Uttara | Free transfer | 18 October 2022 | |
| 21 | DF | (Bangladesh) Mohammad Emon | (Bangladesh) Sheikh Jamal DC | Free transfer | 18 October 2022 | |
| 43 | FW | (Ghana) Richard Gadze | (Azerbaijan) Sumgayit FK | Free transfer | 27 October 2022 | |
| 23 | DF | (Bangladesh) Rostam Islam Dukhu Mia | (Bangladesh) Chittagong Abahani | Free transfer | 29 October 2022 | |
| 5 | DF | (Bangladesh) Nasiruddin Chowdhury | (Bangladesh) Chittagong Abahani | Free transfer | 2 November 2022 | |
| 27 | MF | (Bangladesh) Md Golam Rabby | (Bangladesh) Sheikh Russel KC | Free transfer | 7 November 2022 | |
| 11 | FW | (Bangladesh) Mannaf Rabby | (Bangladesh) Sheikh Jamal DC | Free transfer | 7 November 2022 | |
| 26 | MF | (Bangladesh) Mohamed Didarul Islam | (Bangladesh) Fortis FC | Free transfer | 7 November 2022 | |
| 6 | DF | (Bangladesh) Habibur Rahman Sohag | Unattached | Released | 7 November 2022 | |
| 17 | MF | (Bangladesh) Salman Khan | Unattached | Released | 7 November 2022 | |
| 15 | DF | (Bangladesh) Apurbo Mali | Unattached | Released | 7 November 2022 | |
| 16 | DF | (Bangladesh) Emon Islam Babu | Unattached | Released | 7 November 2022 | |
| 20 | FW | (Bangladesh) Ismahil Akinade | Unattached | Released | 7 November 2022 | |
| 10 | FW | (Democratic Republic of the Congo) Junior Mapuku | Unattached | Released | 6 March 2023 | |

=== Retained ===
| No. | Pos | Player | Fee | Date | Source |
|---|---|---|---|---|---|
| 24 | FW | (Bangladesh) Dipok Roy | Not disclosed | 8 August 2022 | |
| 9 | MF | (Bangladesh) Hemanta Vincent Biswas | Not disclosed | 11 August 2022 | |
| 1 | GK | (Bangladesh) Ashraful Islam Rana | Not disclosed | 7 November 2022 | |
| 7 | DF | (Bangladesh) Khalekurzaman Sabuj | Not disclosed | 7 November 2022 | |
| 28 | GK | (Bangladesh) Ibrahim Hossain | Not disclosed | 7 November 2022 | |
| 26 | DF | (Bangladesh) Rabiul Alam | Not disclosed | 7 November 2022 | |
| 30 | GK | (Bangladesh) Sabuj Das Roghu | Not disclosed | 7 November 2022 | |
| 88 | MF | (Ivory Coast) Kpehi Didier Brossou | Not disclosed | 7 November 2022 | |

== Competitions ==
Win Draw Loss Fixtures

=== Overall ===
| Competition | First match | Last match | Final Position |
|---|---|---|---|
| BPL | 10 December 2022 | 22 July 2023 | 5th |
| Federation Cup | 24 January 2023 | 23 May 2023 | Fourth-place |
| Independence Cup | 13 November 2022 | 5 December 2022 | Runners-up |

=== Overview ===
| Competition | Record | | | | | | | |
| Competition | Pld | W | D | L | GF | GA | GD | Win % |
|---|---|---|---|---|---|---|---|---|
| BPL | 20 | 8 | 6 | 6 | 33 | 30 | +3 | 40.00 |
| Independence Cup | 6 | 4 | 1 | 1 | 12 | 5 | +7 | 66.67 |
| Federation Cup | 5 | 2 | 0 | 3 | 6 | 8 | −2 | 40.00 |
| Total | 31 | 14 | 7 | 10 | 51 | 43 | +8 | 45.16 |

Source: Competitions

=== Premier League ===
==== League table ====
| Pos | Team | Pld | W | D | L | GF | GA | GD | Pts |
|---|---|---|---|---|---|---|---|---|---|
| 3 | Bangladesh Police FC | 20 | 10 | 5 | 5 | 39 | 21 | +18 | 35 |
| 4 | Mohammedan SC | 20 | 9 | 5 | 6 | 38 | 21 | +17 | 32 |
| 5 | Sheikh Russel KC | 20 | 8 | 6 | 6 | 33 | 30 | +3 | 30 |
| 6 | Sheikh Jamal DC | 20 | 5 | 9 | 6 | 25 | 32 | −7 | 24 |
| 7 | Fortis FC | 20 | 5 | 8 | 7 | 23 | 25 | −2 | 23 |

Source: Soccerway
Rules for classification: 1) Points; 2) Goal difference; 3) Goals scored.

==== Results summary ====
| Overall | | | | | | | | Home | | | | | | Away | | | | | |
| Pld | W | D | L | GF | GA | GD | Pts | W | D | L | GF | GA | GD | W | D | L | GF | GA | GD |
|---|---|---|---|---|---|---|---|---|---|---|---|---|---|---|---|---|---|---|---|
| 20 | 8 | 6 | 6 | 33 | 30 | +3 | 30 | 4 | 4 | 2 | 18 | 15 | +3 | 4 | 2 | 4 | 15 | 15 | 0 |

Source: Soccerway

==== Results by round ====
| Round | 1 | 2 | 3 | 4 | 5 | 6 | 7 | 8 | 9 | 10 | 11 | 12 | 13 | 14 | 15 | 16 | 17 | 18 | 19 | 20 | 21 | 22 |
|---|---|---|---|---|---|---|---|---|---|---|---|---|---|---|---|---|---|---|---|---|---|---|
| Ground | H | A | (Note: No Sheikh Russel KC matchday in this round.) | H | A | H | A | H | A | H | A | A | H | (Note: No Sheikh Russel KC matchday in this round.) | A | H | A | H | A | H | A | H |
| Result | L | W | – | W | L | D | L | W | W | D | L | W | D | – | W | D | L | L | D | W | D | W |
| Position | 9 | 6 | 7 | 4 | 4 | 5 | 5 | 5 | 4 | 4 | 4 | 3 | 3 | 5 | 3 | 3 | 4 | 5 | 5 | 5 | 5 | 5 |

Source: Matches
A = Away; H = Home; W = Win; D = Draw; L = Loss; P = Postponed

=== Matches ===
| 10 December 2022 1 | Sheikh Russel KC | 1–2 | Bangladesh Police FC | Dhaka |
| 14:30 | Mfon 4' | Report | Jose Alexander Hernandez 7'; Edward Morillo 40' | Stadium: Bashundhara Kings Arena; Referee: Md Mizanur Rahman |

| 23 December 2022 2 | Chittagong Abahani | 2–4 | Sheikh Russel KC | Munshigonj |
| 14:30 BST (UTC+6) | Yacouba 62' (pen.); Nasiruddin 71' | Report | Brossou 40', 81'; Yeasin 49'; Udoh 90+1' | Stadium: Munshigonj District Stadium; Referee: Md Anisur Rahman Sagor |

| 6 January 2023 4 | Sheikh Russel KC | 2–0 | Dhaka Mohammedan | Dhaka |
| 14:45 BST (UTC+6) | Timur Talipov (yellow card) 4'; Abid Ahmed (yellow card) 24'; Mfon 30', 90+1'; Jamal (yellow card) 63' | Report | Roger (yellow card) 36'; Muzaffar Muzaffarov (yellow card) 86' | Stadium: Bashundhara Kings Arena; Referee: Mohammed Nasriuddin |

| 14 January 2023 5 | Sheikh Jamal DC | 3–2 | Sheikh Russel KC | Gopalganj |
| 14:45 BST (UTC+6) | Mannaf Rabbi (yellow card) 28' (goal) 49'; Stewart 34' (pen.); Nodir Mavlonov (yellow card) 60' (goal) 74'; Sohanur Rahman (yellow card) 90+2' | Report | Yeasin (yellow card) 34'; Timur Talipov (yellow card) 55' (goal) 70'; Mfon 75' | Stadium: Sheikh Fazlul Haque Mani Stadium; Referee: Alamgir Sarker |

| 20 January 2023 6 | Sheikh Russel KC | 2–2 | Dhaka Abahani | Dhaka |
| 15:00 BST (UTC+6) | Mapuku 67'; Mfon 90' | Report | Mehedi (yellow card) 12'; Raphael 59'; Kingsley 84'; Yousef (yellow card) 90+5'; Emon (yellow card) 90+8' | Stadium: Bashundhara Kings Arena; Referee: Md Nasiruddin |

| 28 January 2023 7 | Bashundhara Kings | 3–1 | Sheikh Russel KC | Dhaka |
| 15:00 BST (UTC+6) | Tutul (yellow card) 28'; Reza Khanzadeh (yellow card) 57'; Robinho 65' (pen.), 90+7' (yellow card) 90+4'; Dorielton (yellow card) 72'; Asror Gafurov 73' | Report | Jamal (yellow card) 63'; Monir Alam (yellow card) 64'; Mfon 82' (yellow card) 90'; Brossou (yellow card) 90+6' | Stadium: Bashundhara Kings Arena; Referee: Nasir Uddin |

| 4 February 2023 8 | Sheikh Russel KC | 1–0 | AFC Uttara | Dhaka |
| 15:15 BST (UTC+6) | Shawkat Russel (yellow card) 35'; Brossou 55' (pen.) | Report | Rayhan Ahmed (red card) 50'; Salauddin Rubel (yellow card) 51'; Sarower Zaman Nipu (yellow card) 80' | Stadium: Bashundhara Kings Arena; Referee: Jasim Akhter |

| 10 February 2023 9 | Fortis FC | 0–1 | Sheikh Russel KC | Rajshahi |
| 15:45 BST (UTC+6) | Ariful Islam Jitu (yellow card) 15' | Report | Brossou 6'; Dipok Roy (yellow card) 64' | Stadium: Muktijuddho Sriti Stadium; Referee: Jasim Akther |

| 18 February 2023 10 | Sheikh Russel KC | 1–1 | Rahmatganj MFS | Dhaka |
| 15:45 BST (UTC+6) | Mapuku 29' | Report | Shokhrukhbek; Kholmatov (yellow card) 26' (goal) 44' | Stadium: Bashundhara Kings Arena; Referee: Md Saymoon Hasan Sany |

| 25 February 2023 11 | Muktijoddha Sangsad KC | 1–0 | Sheikh Russel KC | Gopalganj |
| 15:45 BST (UTC+6) | Alfaz Miah (yellow card) 55'; Sajib 62' | Report | Hemanta (yellow card) 45+2' | Stadium: Sheikh Fazlul Haque Mani Stadium; Referee: Md Jalaluddin |

| 8 April 2023 12 | Bangladesh Police FC | 1–3 | Sheikh Russel KC | Mymensingh |
| 15:45 BST (UTC+6) | Edward Morillo (yellow card) 24'; Arango 37'; Mohamed Mithu Bhuiyan (yellow card) 42' | Report | Brossou (yellow card) 45+4'; Ibrahim 49'; Mfon 81'; Ucchash 86' | Stadium: Rafiq Uddin Bhuiyan Stadium; Referee: Mahmud Zamal Farouquee Nahid |

| 14 April 2023 13 | Sheikh Russel KC | 2–2 | Chittagong Abahani | Dhaka |
| 15:45 BST (UTC+6) | Marveggio (yellow card) 15'; Faisal Ahmed Shitol 32'; Mfon 62'; Timur Talipov (yellow card) 67' | Report | Ekbal Hussain 2' (yellow card) 5'; Mostafa Kahraba (yellow card) 19'; Forhad Mia 81' | Stadium: Bashundhara Kings Arena; Referee: Md Mizanur Rahman |

| 6 May 2023 15 | Dhaka Mohammedan | 1–2 | Sheikh Russel KC | Comilla |
| 16:00 BST (UTC+6) | Emon (yellow card) 36'; Rajib Hossain (yellow card) 49'; Emmanuel 67' (yellow card) 90+2'; Md Minhajul Abedin Rakib (yellow card) 74' | Report | Jamal (yellow card) 26'; Kenneth (yellow card) 43' (goal) 51'; Monir Alam (yellow card) 61'; Brossou (yellow card) 69'; Mfon 78'; Depok Roy (yellow card) 90+4' | Stadium: Shaheed Dhirendranath Datta Stadium; Referee: Md Saymoon Hasan Sany |

| 12 May 2023 16 | Sheikh Russel KC | 0–0 | Sheikh Jamal DC | Dhaka |
| 16:00 BST (UTC+6) | Abid Ahmed (yellow card) 54' | Report | Shakil (yellow card) 4'; Shakil Hossain (yellow card) 5'; Omar (yellow card) 51'; Sulayman Sillah (yellow card) 80' | Stadium: Bashundhara Kings Arena; Referee: Md Mizanur Rahman |

| 19 May 2023 17 | Dhaka Abahani | 3–1 | Sheikh Russel KC | Comilla |
| 16:00 BST (UTC+6) | Colindres 6'; Ogbugh 32', 76' | Report | Dipok 85' | Stadium: Shaheed Dhirendranath Datta Stadium; Referee: Golam Mourshed Chowdhury Nayon |

| 26 May 2023 18 | Sheikh Russel KC | 4–6 | Bashundhara Kings | Dhaka |
| 16:00 BST (UTC+6) | Sujon Biswas 26'; Dipok 38'; Kenneth 69', 90' (pen.) | Report | Dorielton 6', 50', 65', 76'; Robinho 45+3'; Morsalin 45+5' (yellow card) 45+6'; Badsha (yellow card) 89' | Stadium: Bashundhara Kings Arena; Referee: Md Alamgir Sarker |

| 2 June 2023 19 | AFC Uttara | 1–1 | Sheikh Russel KC | Mymensingh |
| 16:00 BST (UTC+6) | Richard Maturana 22' (yellow card) 45+1' | Report | Brossou 45+8'; Faisal Ahmed Shitol (yellow card) 85' | Stadium: Rafiq Uddin Bhuiyan Stadium; Referee: Golam Mourshed Chowdhury Nayon |

| 7 June 2023 20 | Sheikh Russel KC | 2–0 | Fortis FC | Dhaka |
| 16:00 BST (UTC+6) | Mfon 33'; Shawkat Russel (yellow card) 51'; Ikechukwu 62' | Report | | Stadium: Bashundhara Kings Arena; Referee: Bhubon Mohon Tarafder |

| 15 July 2023 21 | Rahmatganj MFS | 0–0 | Sheikh Russel KC | Munshigonj |
| 16:00 BST (UTC+6) | Khondoker Ashraful Islam (yellow card) 63' | Report | Shawkat Russel (yellow card) 58' | Stadium: Shaheed Bir Sreshtho Flight Lieutenant Matiur Rahman Stadium; Referee: Md Nasiruddin |

| 22 July 2023 22 | Sheikh Russel KC | 3–2 | Muktijoddha Sangsad KC | Dhaka |
| 16:00 BST (UTC+6) | Ikechukwu 4'; Ibrahim 9'; Depok Roy 78' | Report | Uzochukwu 30'; Landry Ndikumana 38' | Stadium: Bashundhara Kings Arena; Referee: Golam Mourshed Chowdhury Nayon |

=== Federation Cup ===
==== Group stages ====
| Pos | Team | Pld | W | D | L | GF | GA | GD | Pts | Qualification |
|---|---|---|---|---|---|---|---|---|---|---|
| 1 | Abahani Limited Dhaka | 2 | 2 | 0 | 0 | 4 | 3 | +1 | 6 | Advance to knockout phase |
| 2 | Sheikh Russel KC | 2 | 1 | 0 | 1 | 4 | 3 | +1 | 3 | Advance to knockout phase |
| 3 | Bangladesh Police FC | 2 | 0 | 0 | 2 | 0 | 2 | −2 | 0 | |

Source: Footystats
Rules for classification: Group stage tiebreakers

| 24 January 2023 | Bangladesh Police FC | 0–1 | Sheikh Russel KC | Munshigonj |
| 15:00 BST (UTC+6) | Arifur Rahman Raju (yellow card) 28'; Rasel Hossain (yellow card) 89' | Report | Ucchash 76' | Stadium: Shaheed Bir Sreshtho Flight Lt. Matiur Rahman Stadium; Referee: Md Jalal Uddin |

| 28 February 2023 | Dhaka Abahani | 3–3 (5–3 p) | Sheikh Russel KC | Gopalganj |
| 15:45 BST (UTC+6) | Mehedi 16'; Eleta 48'; Peter 89' | Report | Monir Hossain (yellow card) 17'; Dipok 67'; Didier 79' (pen.) (yellow card) 80'; Khalekuzzaman Sabuj 84' | Stadium: Sheikh Fazlul Haque Mani Stadium; Referee: Md Nasir Uddin |

==== Knockout stages ====
| 2 May 2023 Quarter-finals | Sheikh Russel KC | 1–0 | Rahmatganj MFS | Munshigonj |
| 15:15 BST (UTC+6) | Ikechukwu 13'; Abid Ahmed (yellow card) 58' (yellow-red card) | Report | | Stadium: Shaheed Bir Sreshtho Flight Lt. Matiur Rahman Stadium; Referee: Md Anisur Rahman Sagor |

| 16 May 2023 Semi-finals | Dhaka Abahani | 3–0 | Sheikh Russel KC | Cumilla |
| 15:15 BST (UTC+6) | Colindres 37'; Fahim 51', 70' | Report | Brossou (yellow card) 65'; Depok Roy (yellow card) 87' | Stadium: Shaheed Dhirendranath Datta Stadium; Referee: Md Mizanur Rahman |

| 23 May 2023 Third-place | Bashundhara Kings | 2–1 | Sheikh Russel KC | Dhaka |
| 15:15 BST (UTC+6) | Mohammed Khalekuzzaman Sabuj 85' (o.g.); Figueira 90+1' | Report | Brossou 7'; Mohiuddin Mahi (yellow card) 54'; Robiul Alam (yellow card) 80' | Stadium: Bashundhara Kings Arena; Referee: Md Nasir Uddin |

=== Independence Cup ===
==== Group A ====
| Pos | Team | Pld | W | D | L | GF | GA | GD | Pts | Qualification |
|---|---|---|---|---|---|---|---|---|---|---|
| 1 | Sheikh Russel KC | 3 | 2 | 1 | 0 | 6 | 1 | +5 | 7 | Advance to Knockout stage |
| 2 | Mohammedan SC | 3 | 2 | 0 | 1 | 5 | 4 | +1 | 6 | Advance to Knockout stage |
| 3 | Fortis FC | 3 | 1 | 1 | 1 | 5 | 5 | 0 | 4 | |
| 4 | Bangladesh Navy | 3 | 0 | 0 | 3 | 1 | 7 | −6 | 0 | |

Source: GSA

| 13 November 2022 | Sheikh Russel KC | 1–1 | Fortis FC | Comilla |
| 14:00 BST (UTC+6) | Mfon 51' | Report | Danilo 38' | Stadium: Comilla District Stadium; Referee: Md Mizanur Rahman |

| 17 November 2022 | Sheikh Russel KC | 2–0 | Bangladesh Navy | Gopalganj |
| 14:00 BST (UTC+6) | Ibrahim 2'; Mapuku 12' | Report | | Stadium: Sheikh Fazlul Haque Mani Stadium; Referee: Anwar Hossain |

| 21 November 2022 | Dhaka Mohammedan | 0–3 | Sheikh Russel KC | Gopalganj |
| 13:00 BST (UTC+6) | | Report | Brossou 2'; Ibrahim 51'; Mfon 59' | Stadium: Sheikh Fazlul Haque Mani Stadium; Referee: Md Anisur Rahman Sagor |

==== Knockout stages ====
| 26 November 2022 Quarter-finals | Sheikh Russel KC | 1–0 | Chittagong Abahani | Comilla |
| 13:00 BST (UTC+6) | Mfon 85' | Report | | Stadium: Comilla District Stadium; Referee: Md Mizanur Rahman |

| 30 November 2022 Semi-finals | Sheikh Russel KC | 3–2 | Dhaka Abahani | Munshigonj |
| 13:00 BST (UTC+6) | Brossou 31'; Mfon 54'; Timur Talipov 72' | Report | Nworah 64'; Colindres 90+5' (pen.) | Stadium: Munshigonj District Stadium; Referee: Md Mizanur Rahman |

| 5 December 2022 Final | Sheikh Russel KC | 2–2 (a.e.t.) (1–4 p) | Bashundhara Kings | Comilla |
| 13:00 BST (UTC+6) | Mfon 12', 32' (pen.) | Report | Miguel 1'; Robson 45' (pen.) | Stadium: Comilla District Stadium; Referee: Golam Mourshed Chowdhury Nayan |

== Statistics ==
=== Goalscorers ===
| Rank | Player | Position | Total | BPL | Independence Cup | Federation Cup |
|---|---|---|---|---|---|---|
| 1 | (Nigeria) Mfon Udoh | FW | 17 | 11 | 6 | 0 |
| 2 | (Ivory Coast) Kpehi Didier Brossou | MF | 9 | 5 | 2 | 2 |
| 3 | (Nigeria) Kenneth Ikechukwu | FW | 6 | 5 | 0 | 1 |
| 4 | (Bangladesh) Mohammad Ibrahim | LF | 4 | 2 | 2 | 0 |
| 4 | (Bangladesh) Deepok Roy | MF | 4 | 3 | 0 | 1 |
| 5 | (Democratic Republic of the Congo) Junior Mapuku | CF | 3 | 2 | 1 | 0 |
| 6 | (Uzbekistan) Timur Talipov | DF | 2 | 1 | 1 | 0 |
| 6 | (Bangladesh) Nihat Jaman Ucchash | FW | 2 | 1 | 0 | 1 |
| 7 | (Bangladesh) Faisal Ahmed Shitol | FW | 1 | 1 | 0 | 0 |
| 7 | (Bangladesh) Yeasin Khan | DF | 1 | 1 | 0 | 0 |
| 7 | (Bangladesh) Khalekuzzaman Sabuj | DF | 1 | 0 | 0 | 1 |
| 7 | (Bangladesh) Sujon Biswas | MF | 1 | 1 | 0 | 0 |
| Total | | | 50 | 32 | 12 | 6 |

Source: Matches
