= 2024–25 Sheikh Russel KC season =

Sheikh Russel KC
2024–25 season
- President: Sayem Sobhan Anvir
- Head coach: Jugoslav Trenchovski
- Stadium: Bashundhara Kings Arena
- Bangladesh Premier League: Withdrew
- Federation Cup: Failed to participate
Home colours	Away colours

The 2024–25 season is Sheikh Russel KC's 30th overall since its establishment in 1995 and their 18th season in the Bangladesh Premier League. In addition to the domestic league, Sheikh Russel will participate in this season's edition of the Federation Cup and Independence Cup. The season covers a period from 1 June 2024 to TBC 2024.

== Players ==
As of 22 August 2024

No.	Player	Nat.	Position(s)	Date of birth	Year signed	Previous club
Goalkeepers
29	Mehedi Islam Rabbani	(Bangladesh)	GK	12 February 2005 (aged 19)	2023	GWC Munshigonj
Defenders
27	Apon Sarkar	(Bangladesh)	CB	29 March 2007 (aged 17)	2023	
Midfielders
Forwards

== Transfer ==
=== Out ===
No.	Pos	Player	Moved to	Fee	Date	Source
19	FW	Sarower Zaman Nipu	Abahani Limited Dhaka	Free transfer	2 June 2024	
1	GK	Mitul Marma	Abahani Limited Dhaka	Free transfer	4 June 2024	
24	MF	Dipok Roy	Bangladesh Police FC	Free transfer	4 June 2024	
95	FW	(Serbia) Vojislav Balabanovic	(Serbia) FK Smederevo 1924	Free transfer	10 July 2024	
44	DF	(Ukraine) Valeriy Stepanenko	(Kyrgyzstan) FC Neftchi Kochkor-Ata	Free transfer	22 July 2024	
17	FW	Nihat Jaman Ucchash	Rahmatganj MFS	Free transfer	2 August 2024	

== Competitions ==
Win Draw Loss Fixtures

=== Overall ===
Competition	First match	Last match	Final Position
BPL			Withdrew
Federation Cup			Failed to participate

=== Premier League ===
==== League table ====
Pos	Team	Pld	W	D	L	GF	GA	GD	Pts	Qualification or relegation
1	Mohammedan (Note: Mohammedan does not possess an AFC Challenge League licence.) (C)	18	13	3	2	46	16	+30	42	
2	Dhaka Abahani	18	10	5	3	31	8	+23	35	Qualification for the AFC Challenge League qualifying stage
3	Bashundhara Kings (W)	18	9	5	4	45	15	+30	32	Qualification for the AFC Challenge League qualifying stage (Note: as Federation Cup winners.)
4	Rahmatganj	18	9	3	6	39	25	+14	30	
5	Brothers Union	18	7	6	5	28	18	+10	27	
6	Fortis	18	6	9	3	24	15	+9	27	
7	Bangladesh Police	18	8	3	7	23	24	−1	27	
8	Fakirerpool	18	6	1	11	23	54	−31	19	
9	Dhaka Wanderers (R)	18	3	1	14	14	55	−41	10	Relegation to BCL
10	Chittagong Abahani (R)	18	1	0	17	7	50	−43	3	Relegation to BCL

Source: Soccerway
Rules for classification: 1) Points; 2) Goal difference; 3) Goals scored.
(C) Champion; (R) Relegated; (W) Cup Winner

== Statistics ==
=== Goalscorers ===
As of 2024

Rank	Player	Position	Total	BPL	Independence Cup	Federation Cup
1	TBC	TBC	0	0	0	0
Total			0	0	0	0
