= 2023 Federation Cup (Bangladesh) final =

Football match in Bangladesh

2023 Federation Cup final
- Event: Federation Cup
Mohammedan SC	Abahani Limited Dhaka
4	4
- After extra time Mohammedan SC won 4–2 on penalties
- Date: 30 May 2023
- Venue: Shaheed Dhirendranath Datta Stadium, Cumilla
- Man of the Match: Souleymane Diabate
- Referee: Md. Alomgir Sarker
- Attendance: 12,600

The 2023 Federation Cup final was the final match of the 2022–23 Federation Cup (Bangladesh), the 34th edition of Bangladeshi premier club football tournament organised by BFF. It was held at Shaheed Dhirendranath Datta Stadium in Cumilla, on 30 May 2023 between Mohammedan SC and Abahani Limited Dhaka. Mohammedan won the match on 4–2 on penalties after full time 4–4 scoreline.

== Match ==
=== Details ===
30 May 2023
15:15

Mohammedan SC	4–4 (a.e.t.)	Abahani Limited Dhaka
Diabate 57', 61', 84', 105+4'	Report	Fahim 17'; Colindres 43'; Emeka 66'; Rahmat 118'
Penalties
Diabate (penalty scored); Alamgir (penalty scored); Roger (penalty scored); Emon (penalty missed); Kamrul (penalty scored)	4–2	Augusto (penalty missed); Emeka (penalty scored); Yousef (penalty scored); Colindres (penalty missed)

Shaheed Dhirendranath Datta Stadium, Cumilla
Attendance: 12,600
Referee: Md Alamgir Sarker

Manager:
(Portugal) Mário Lemos

Manager:
(Bangladesh) Alfaz Ahmed

Man of the Match:
Souleymane Diabate (Mohammedan SC)

Match rules

- 90 minutes
- 30 minutes of extra time if necessary
- Penalty shoot-out if scores still level
- Nine named substitutes
- Maximum of five substitutions, with a sixth allowed in extra time. (Note: Each team was given only three opportunities to make substitutions, with a fourth opportunity in extra time, excluding substitutions made at half-time, before the start of extra time and at half-time in extra time.)
