= 2020–21 Abahani Limited Dhaka season =

Abahani Ltd. Dhaka 2020–21 football season

Abahani Limited Dhaka
2020–21 season
- Director: Kazi Nabil Ahmed
- Head coach: Mário Lemos
- Stadium: Bangabandhu National Stadium, Dhaka
- Bangladesh Premier League: 3rd
- Federation Cup: Semi final
- Independence Cup: Not held
- AFC Cup: Withdrawn (Note: The preliminary round 2 match between Abahani Limited Dhaka and Eagles was originally scheduled to be played on 14 April 2021, 16:30 UTC+6, at Bangabandhu National Stadium, Dhaka, but was rescheduled to be played on 21 April 2021, 17:30 UTC+5:45, at Dasharath Rangasala, Kathmandu (Nepal), due to the COVID-19 pandemic in Bangladesh, which caused a lockdown starting from 14 April. However, it had been further postponed. On 30 April 2021, AFC finally decided that Abahani Limited Dhaka was considered to have withdrawn from the competition and that the situation constituted an event of force majeure. AFC awarded the playoff slot to the Eagles.)
- Top goalscorer: League: Kervens Belfort (17); All: Kervens Belfort (19)
- Biggest win: 0–8 Vs Uttar Baridhara Club (26 August 2021)
- Biggest defeat: 1–4 Vs Bashundhara Kings (28 February 2021)
Home colours	Away colours
- All statistics correct as of 20 September 2021.

The 2020–21 season was Abahani Limited Dhaka's 13th consecutive season in the Bangladesh Premier League since the initiation of the league, and the 46th overall season in the top flight of Bangladeshi football. On 16 March 2020, all sorts of sports activities in Bangladesh were postponed due to the spread of coronavirus in the country, according to a press release issued by the Ministry of Youth and Sports. So the beginning of this season was delayed.

== Season review ==
=== Pre-season ===
Abahani Dhaka was not so active in the transfer window as the club wanted to sign one or two new foreign players only. However, Brazilian defender Maílson Alves already left the club on a free transfer in September. In October, it was confirmed that the club will renew the contract of Portuguese head coach Mário Lemos. It was also confirmed that Abahani won't release any local player. Though they signed goalkeeper Shuhagh Hossain.

== Players ==
Dhaka Abahani Limited squad for the 2020–21 season.

As of 1 July 2021

Note: Flags indicate national team as defined under FIFA eligibility rules; some limited exceptions apply. Players may hold more than one non-FIFA nationality.

No.	Pos.	Nation	Player
1	GK	BAN	Shahidul Alam Sohel
2	DF	BAN	Raihan Hasan
3	DF	BAN	Waly Faisal
4	DF	BAN	Nasiruddin Chowdhury
5	DF	BAN	Tutul Hossain Badsha
6	MF	BAN	Mamunul Islam
7	MF	BAN	Sohel Rana (2nd captain)
8	MF	BAN	Pranotosh Kumar Das
10	FW	BAN	Nabib Newaj Jibon (Captain)
11	FW	BAN	Rubel Miya
12	MF	BAN	Jewel Rana
14	DF	BAN	Mamun Miah
15	FW	BAN	Saad Uddin
16	MF	BAN	Mohamed Sohel Rana
17	FW	NGR	Sunday Chizoba

No.	Pos.	Nation	Player
18	GK	BAN	Sultan Ahmed Shakil
19	DF	AFG	Masih Saighani
20	FW	HAI	Kervens Belfort
21	DF	BAN	Muhammad Nazim Uddin
22	GK	BAN	Mohammad Nayeem Mia
23	MF	BAN	Mohammad Ridoy
24	MF	BAN	Dipok Roy
25	GK	BAN	Mohammad Shamim Hossen
26	DF	BAN	Syed Arafat Hossain Tasin
27	FW	BAN	Faisal Ahmed Shitol
29	DF	BAN	Shakir Ahmed
30	GK	BAN	Shohug Hossain Palash
35	MF	BAN	Al Amin Hassan Aanaf
80	MF	BRA	Raphael Augusto

== Transfers ==
=== In ===
No.	Pos	Player	Previous club	Fee	Date	Source
9	FW	(Brazil) Francisco Wagsley	(Indonesia) Borneo FC	Free transfer	20 November 2020	
80	MF	(Brazil) Raphael Augusto	(India) Bengaluru FC	Free transfer	30 November 2020	
19	DF	(Afghanistan) Masih Saighani	(India) Chennaiyin FC	Free transfer	9 December 2020	
30	GK	(Bangladesh) Shuhagh Hossain	(Bangladesh) Team BJMC	Free transfer	9 December 2020	
17	FW	(Nigeria) Sunday Chizoba	Free agent	Free transfer	7 April 2021	

=== Out ===
No.	Pos	Player	Moved to	Fee	Date	Source
-	DF	(Egypt) Alaaeldin Nasr Elmagraby	(Bangladesh) Rahmatganj MFS	Free	1 August 2020	
19	DF	(Brazil) Maílson Alves	(Brazil) SER Caxias	Free	8 September 2020	
10	FW	(Nigeria) Sunday Chizoba	No Club	Free	1 November 2020	
17	MF	(Kyrgyzstan) Edgar Bernhardt	(Kyrgyzstan) FC Dordoi Bishkek	Free	1 December 2020	
9	FW	(Brazil) Francisco Wagsley	(Indonesia) Borneo F.C.	Free	5 April 2021	
13	DF	(Bangladesh) Atiqur Rahman Meshu	(Bangladesh) Brothers Union	Free	April 2021	

== Pre-season and friendlies ==
14 December 2020	Abahani Limited Dhaka	3–0	Uttar Baridhara	Dhaka
14:30 BST	Jewel; Torres			Stadium: Abahani Field

7 April 2021	Abahani Limited Dhaka	2–1	Uttar Baridhara	Dhaka
14:30 BST	Saighani			Stadium: Abahani Field

== Competitions ==
=== Overview ===
Competition	First match	Last match	Starting round	Final position	Record							
Competition	First match	Last match	Starting round	Final position	Pld	W	D	L	GF	GA	GD	Win %
BPL	14 January 2021	20 September 2021	Matchday 1	3	24	13	8	3	65	29	+36	54.17
Federation Cup	24 December 2020	7 January 2021	Group Stage	Semi-final	4	3	0	1	7	4	+3	75.00
AFC Cup	April 2021		Cancelled		0	0	0	0	0	0	+0	—
Independence Cup	TBD	TBD	Group Stage	Didn't held	0	0	0	0	0	0	+0	—
Total					28	16	8	4	72	33	+39	57.14

Last updated: 20 September 2021
Source: Soccerway

=== Federation Cup ===
==== Group D ====
Pos	Team	Pld	W	D	L	GF	GA	GD	Pts	Qualification
1	Dhaka Abahani	2	2	0	0	5	1	+4	6	Quarter Finals
2	Dhaka Mohammedan	2	1	0	1	4	4	0	3	Quarter Finals
3	Muktijoddha Sangsad KC	2	0	0	2	2	6	−4	0	

Source: Soccerway

24 December 2020	Abahani Limited Dhaka	3–0	Dhaka Mohammedan	Dhaka
19:15 BST	Masih 41'; Jewel 45', 53'	Report		Stadium: Bangabandhu National Stadium

30 December 2020	Muktijoddha Sangsad KC	1–2	Abahani Limited Dhaka	Dhaka
17:45 BST	Rohit 87'	Report	Masih 30'; Belfort 69'	Stadium: Bangabandhu National Stadium; Referee: Jalal Uddin

==== Knockout phase ====
4 January 2021 Quarter Final	Abahani Limited Dhaka	1–0	Uttar Baridhara Club	Dhaka
16:00 BST	Torres 90+5'	Report		Stadium: Bangabandhu National Stadium; Referee: Alomgir Sarker

7 January 2021 Semi Final	Bashundhara Kings	3–1 (a.e.t.)	Abahani Limited Dhaka	Dhaka
16:00 BST	Fernandes 51', 120+1'; Becerra 111'	Report	Wagsley 31'	Stadium: Bangabandhu National Stadium; Referee: Sujit Banerjee

=== Premier League ===
==== League table ====
Pos	Team	Pld	W	D	L	GF	GA	GD	Pts	Qualification or relegation
1	Bashundhara Kings (C, Q)	24	21	2	1	60	10	+50	65	Qualification for AFC Cup Group stage
2	Sheikh Jamal DC (Note: Sheikh Jamal cannot qualify for Asian Football Confederation competitions as they were not granted an AFC Cup license for 2022.)	24	15	7	2	53	28	+25	52	
3	Dhaka Abahani (Q)	24	13	8	3	65	29	+36	47	Qualification for AFC Cup qualifying play-offs
4	Saif Sporting Club	24	14	2	8	48	37	+11	44	
5	Chittagong Abahani	24	13	5	6	38	28	+10	44	

Source: Soccerway
Rules for classification: 1) Points; 2) Goal difference; 3) Goals scored.
(C) Champions; (Q) Qualify for the AFC competition

==== Results summary ====
Overall								Home						Away					
Pld	W	D	L	GF	GA	GD	Pts	W	D	L	GF	GA	GD	W	D	L	GF	GA	GD
24	13	8	3	64	29	+35	47	7	3	2	28	17	+11	6	5	1	36	12	+24

Last updated: 20 September 2021.
Source: Soccerway

==== Results by round ====
Round	1	2	3	4	5	6	7	8	9	10	11	12	13	14	15	16	17	18	19	20	21	22	23	24	25	26
Ground	H	A	H	A	H	A	H	A	H	A	-	H	H	A	H	A	H	A	H	A	H	A	H	A	A	A
Result	W	W	W	D	D	W	D	W	W	D	-	L	W	D	W	W	D	W	L	D	W	L	W	-	D	W
Position	5	2	2	2	4	3	4	2	2	2	3	3	3	3	3	2	2	2	3	3	2	3	3	3	3	3

Updated to match(es) played on 20 September 2021. Source: Matches
A = Away; H = Home; W = Win; D = Draw; L = Loss; P = Postponed

==== Matches ====
14 January 2021 Round 1	Abahani Ltd. Dhaka	1–0	Bangladesh Police FC	Dhaka
16:00 BST	Belfort 85'	Report	Shadhin (yellow card) 71'	Stadium: Bangabandhu National Stadium; Referee: GM Chowdhury

19 January 2021 Round 2	Brothers Union	0–2	Abahani Ltd. Dhaka	Dhaka
18:00 BST	Monday (yellow card) 33'	Report	Torres (penalty scored) 34' Belfort 41'	Stadium: Bangabandhu National Stadium; Referee: Bhubon Torofdar

23 January 2021 Round 3	Abahani Ltd. Dhaka	1–0	Rahmatganj MFS	Dhaka
15:30 BST	Miya (yellow card) 33'; Rana 79'	Report	Mehebub Nayan (yellow card) 57'	Stadium: Bangabandhu National Stadium; Referee: Mizanur Rahman

28 January 2021 Round 4	Dhaka Mohammedan	2–2	Abahani Ltd. Dhaka	Comilla
15:00 BST	Diabate 17', 66' Jafar Iqbal (yellow card) 21' Coulidiati (yellow card) 56'	Report	Torres 14' Saad (yellow card) 21'; Rana 33'	Stadium: Comilla Stadium; Referee: Mohammad Jalaluddin

1 February 2021 Round 5	Abahani Ltd. Dhaka	1–1	Chittagong Abahani	Dhaka
15:30 BST	Torres (penalty scored) 32' Raihan Hasan (yellow card) 52'	Report	Didier (yellow card) 33'; Nixon (penalty scored) 45+2' (penalty missed) 88' Monjurur (yellow card) 63'	Stadium: Bangabandhu National Stadium; Referee: M. Rahman (Bangladesh)

5 February 2021 Round 6	Muktijoddha Sangsad KC	1–4	Abahani Ltd. Dhaka	Dhaka
18:00 BST	Nipu 66'; Mithu (yellow card) 90'	Report	Saighani 15', 53'; Rana (yellow card) 40' (goal) 45+1'; Shahidul (yellow card) 50'; Torres (yellow card) 54'; Roy 76'	Stadium: Bangabandhu National Stadium; Referee: M. Uddin (Bangladesh)

9 February 2021 Round 7	Abahani Ltd. Dhaka	2–2	Sheikh Jamal DC	Dhaka
15:30 BST	Belfort 13'; Jewel Rana (red card) 40'; Torres 46'	Report	Sillah 19'; Kanform (red card) 40'; Jobe 72'	Stadium: Bangabandhu National Stadium; Referee: G.Chawdhury Nayan (Bangladesh)

13 February 2021 Round 8	Arambagh KS	0–4	Abahani Ltd. Dhaka	Munshigonj
15:00 BST	Rocky (yellow card) 34'	Report	Torres 31', 42'; Saighani 61'; Smith 87' (o.g.)	Stadium: Munshigonj Stadium; Referee: B. Torofdar (Bangladesh)

16 February 2021 Round 9	Abahani Ltd. Dhaka	2–0	Saif Sporting Club	Dhaka
15:30 BST	Raihan Hasan (yellow card) 47'; Augusto 53'; Belfort 66'; Shahidul (yellow card) 76'	Report	Sirozhiddin (yellow card) 63'	Stadium: Bangabandhu National Stadium; Referee: M. Rahman (Bangladesh)

20 February 2021 Round 10	Sheikh Russel KC	1–1	Abahani Ltd. Dhaka	Dhaka
18:00 BST	Asrorov 90+2'	Report	Uddin 25'	Stadium: Bangabandhu National Stadium; Referee: M. Uddin (Bangladesh)

28 February 2021 Round 12	Abahani Ltd. Dhaka	1–4	Bashundhara Kings	Dhaka
16:00 BST	Nasiruddin (yellow card) 56'; Belfort (penalty scored) 81'	Report	Becerra 18', 76'; Shafiei 25'; Fernandes 51'; Biplu Ahmed (yellow card) 73'	Stadium: Bangabandhu National Stadium; Referee: B.Barua (Bangladesh)

4 March 2021 Round 13	Abahani Ltd. Dhaka	2–1	Uttar Baridhara Club	Dhaka
18:45 BST	Torres (penalty scored) 26'; Fozilov 55' (o.g.)	Report	Sohel Rana (yellow card) 29'; Sayed 90'	Stadium: Bangabandhu National Stadium; Referee: M. Nahid (Bangladesh)

30 April 2021 Round 14	Police FC	2–2	Abahani Ltd. Dhaka	Dhaka
19:00 BST	C. Kouakou 41' 60'; Jalal Miya (yellow card) 44'	Report	J. Rana 34'; S. Chizoba 43'	Stadium: Bangabandhu National Stadium; Referee: M. Rahman (Bangladesh)

4 May 2021 Round 15	Abahani Ltd. Dhaka	5–2	Brothers Union	Dhaka
16:00 BST	Sunday 22' Nasiruddin 40' Jewel 44' Belfort 62' Rubel 81'	Report	C. Oriaku (yellow card) 18' Magalan 77' 90+5' (pen.)	Stadium: Bangabandhu National Stadium; Referee: GM Chowdury

7 May 2021 Round 16	Rahmatganj MFS	0–6	Abahani Ltd. Dhaka	Dhaka
16:00 BST		Report	Beknazarov 27' (o.g.) Belfort 37' 43' 62' Mamun 65' Saighani 85'	Stadium: Bangabandhu National Stadium; Referee: Bituraj Barua

26 June 2021 Round 17	Abahani Ltd. Dhaka	1–1	Mohammedan SC	Dhaka
17:00 BST	Belfort 4'	Report	Iqbal (yellow card) 23'; Ouatching 30'	Stadium: Bangabandhu National Stadium; Referee: Mizanur Rahman

1 July 2021 Round 18	Chittagong Abahani	0–2	Dhaka Abahani	Dhaka
17:00 BST	Brossou (yellow card) 90+1'	Report	Chizoba 34'; Chizoba (yellow card) 45+1'; Islam 52'	Stadium: Bangabandhu National Stadium; Referee: Mohammed Jalaluddin

18 July 2021 Round 19	Dhaka Abahani	2–4	Muktijoddha Sangsad KC	Dhaka
18:45 BST	S. Chizoba 45+2' (pen.); M. Saighani (yellow card) 45+5'; M. Ridoy (yellow card) 62'; R. Hasan (yellow card) 72'; F. Ahmed 90+2'	Report	I. Dicko 17'; F. Ballo 44', 63'; S. Nipu 84' (yellow card) 86'	Stadium: Bangabandhu National Stadium; Referee: Bituraj Barua

6 August 2021 Round 20	Sheikh Jamal DC	2–2	Abahani Ltd. Dhaka	Dhaka
16:00 BST	Monir (yellow card) 7' Jobe 31' (yellow card) 79' S. K. Kanform (yellow card) 41' (goal) 45' O. Valijonov (yellow card) 89'	Report	M. Saighani (yellow card) 16' S. Chizoba 52' (penalty missed) 79' (yellow card) 80' K. Belfort 88'	Stadium: Bangabandhu National Stadium; Referee: Bituraj Barua

9 August 2021 Round 21	Abahani Ltd. Dhaka	6–1	Arambagh KS	Dhaka
18:15 BST	Jewel Rana 19', 21', 90+1'; Sunday Chizoba 43'; Faisal Ahmed Shitol 68'; Sohel Rana 88'	Report	Dilshod Nazirov 79'	Stadium: Bangabandhu National Stadium; Referee: Mohammed Jalaluddin

13 August 2021 Round 22	Saif SC	3–2	Abahani Ltd. Dhaka	Dhaka
16:00 BST	K. Ikechukwu 43', 81'; J. Okoli 45+2'; Rafi (yellow card) 50'; Rimon (yellow card) 72'		Saad Uddin (yellow card) 15'; Saighani (yellow card) 46' K. Belfort 76'; Jewel 78' Ridoy (yellow card) 84'	Stadium: Bangabandhu National Stadium; Referee: Mohammed Jalaluddin

17 August 2021 Round 23	Abahani Ltd. Dhaka	5–1	Sheikh Russel KC	Dhaka
16:00 BST	Sunday 32' 90+3' R. Augusto 70' 88' K. Belfort 80'	Report	S. Asrorov 64'	Stadium: Bangabandhu National Stadium; Referee: Mohan Bhaban

20 September 2021 Round 25	Bashundhara Kings	1–1	Abahani Ltd. Dhaka	Dhaka
16:00 BST (UTC+6)	Barman 37'	Report	Barman 28' (o.g.); M. Ridoy (yellow card) 36' Rayhan (yellow card) 81' S. Uddin (yellow card) 90+3'	Stadium: Bangabandhu National Stadium; Referee: Bituraj Barua
Note: This match was rescheduled from August to September due to Bashundhara Kings's 2021 AFC Cup group stage matches.

26 August 2021 Round 26	Uttar Baridhara Club	0–8	Abahani Ltd. Dhaka	Dhaka
16:00 BST	Mitul Marma (yellow card) 32'	Report	R. Augusto (penalty scored) 4' K. Belfort 34' 68' 74' 90'; Sunday 41'; Ridoy (yellow card) 45'; Jewel 64' 66'; Waly (yellow card) 84'	Stadium: Bangabandhu National Stadium; Referee: Mohammed Saymon Hassan

=== AFC Cup ===
==== Qualifying play-offs ====
Preliminary round 2

April 2021	Abahani Ltd. Dhaka (Bangladesh)	Cancelled	(Maldives) Club Eagles	TBC
16:30 UTC+6		Stats Report

== Statistics ==
=== Goalscorers ===
As of matches played till 20 September 2021

Rank	Nat.	Player	Position	Total	BPL	Federation Cup	Independence Cup
1	(Haiti)	Kervens Belfort	FW	19	17	2	–
2	(Bangladesh)	Jewel Rana	FW	12	10	2	–
3	(Brazil)	Francisco Wagsley	FW	9	7	2	–
4	(Nigeria)	Sunday Chizoba	FW	9	9	0	–
5	(Afghanistan)	Masih Saighani	DF	6	4	2	–
6	(Brazil)	Raphael Augusto	MF	4	4	0	–
7	(Bangladesh)	Dipok Roy	MF	2	2	0	–
7	(Bangladesh)	Faisal Ahmed Shitol	FW	2	2	0	–
9	(Bangladesh)	Saad Uddin	DF	1	1	0	–
9	(Bangladesh)	Sohel Rana	MF	1	1	0	–
9	(Bangladesh)	Mamunul Islam	MF	1	1	0	–
9	(Bangladesh)	Nasiruddin Chowdhury	DF	1	1	0	–
9	(Bangladesh)	Rubel Miya	FW	1	1	0	–
9	(Bangladesh)	Mamun Miah	DF	1	1	0	–
9	(Bangladesh)	Mohammad Sohel Rana	MF	1	1	0	
Own				4	4		
Total				74	66	8	0
