= 2020–21 Saif Sporting Club season =

Saif Sporting Club
2020–21 season
- Owner: Saif Powertec Limited
- Head coach: Paul Put (until 26 February); Zulfiker Mahmud Mintu (interim; from 26 February to 8 March); Stewart Hall (from 9 March to 31 July); Zulfiker Mahmud Mintu (from 1 August)
- Stadium: Bangabandhu National Stadium
- Bangladesh Premier League: 4th
- Federation Cup: Final
- Independence Cup: Cancelled
- Top goalscorer: League: John Okoli (18); All: John Okoli (18)
- Biggest win: 6–1 vs Brothers Union
- Biggest defeat: 2–5 vs Chittagong Abahani
Home colours	Away colours

The 2020–21 season is Saif SC's 5th season since its establishment in 2016 and their 4th consecutive season in the Bangladesh Premier League after promoting in 2017.

On 16 March 2020, all sorts of sports activities in Bangladesh were postponed until 31 March as a precaution to combat the spread of coronavirus in the country, according to a press release issued by the Ministry of Youth and Sports. So the beginning of this season was delayed.

== Season review ==
=== Pre-season ===
Before the beginning of the season, Saif Sporting Club was looking forward to replacing their head coach, Drago Mamic, and renewing their contract with team captain Jamal Bhuyan. Saif was also interested to replace foreign players & some local youths. Jahongir Ergashev and Murolimzhon Akhmedov already left the club to join FK Khujand and FC Neftchi, respectively. On 24 September, it was announced that Emery Bayisenge was joining Rwandan club AS Kigali on a one-year loan deal from Saif SC. According to a Rwandan news publisher, the transfer fee was 12 million Rwandan francs.

On 29 October, managing director Nasiruddin Chowdhury confirmed that they were bringing Belgian coach Paul Put to replace Mamic.

On 31 October, Saif SC sent names of three players they want to let go for the 2020–21 season to BFF. The players were forward Mehebub Hasan Nayan & Kafsut Taius along with defender Nazmul Hossain Akondo.

On 11 November, the club officially announced the signing of Emmanuel Ariwachukwu, John Okoli, Kenneth Ikechukwu, and Sirozhiddin Rakhmatullaev.

On 29 November, Saif SC played a pre-season friendly with Bangladesh Police FC. The match was won 2–0 as Kenneth & John found the net.

== Players ==
Saif Sporting Club Limited squad for the 2020–21 season.

As of 19 April 2021

Note: Flags indicate national team as defined under FIFA eligibility rules; some limited exceptions apply. Players may hold more than one non-FIFA nationality.

No.	Pos.	Nation	Player
1	GK	BAN	Pappu Hossain
2	DF	BAN	Yeasin Arafat
3	DF	BAN	Rahmat Mia
4	MF	UZB	Sirozhiddin Rakhmatullaev
5	DF	BAN	Riyadul Hasan Rafi (Vice-captain)
6	MF	BAN	Jamal Bhuyan (Captain)
8	FW	NGR	John Okoli
10	MF	BAN	Shahedul Alam Shahed Sr.
12	MF	BAN	Sazzad Hossain
14	MF	BAN	Mohammad Al Amin
15	DF	NGR	Emmanuel Ariwachukwu
17	FW	BAN	Foysal Ahmed Fahim
19	FW	BAN	Arifur Rahman
20	FW	BAN	Maraz Hossain Opi
21	DF	BAN	Imran Hasan Rimon
22	GK	BAN	Shanto Kumar Ray

No.	Pos.	Nation	Player
27	MF	BAN	Sagor Hossain
28	MF	BAN	Abu Shaeid
29	FW	BAN	Rahim Uddin
30	GK	BAN	Saiful Islam
31	GK	BAN	Emon Hawladar
32	FW	NGR	Kenneth Ikechukwu
33	DF	BAN	Abid Ahmed
34	MF	BAN	Jayed Ahmed
41	DF	BAN	Tanvir Hossain
44	DF	BAN	Sabuz Hossain
55	DF	BAN	Sobug Chandra Das
88	MF	BAN	Nayan Miah

== Transfers ==
=== In ===
No.	Pos	Player	Transferred from	Fee	Date	Source
4	MF	(Uzbekistan) Sirozhiddin Rakhmatullaev	(Uzbekistan) FK Mash'al Mubarek	Free transfer	11 November 2020	
8	FW	(Nigeria) John Okoli	(Turkey) Bandırmaspor	Free transfer	11 November 2020	
15	DF	(Nigeria) Emmanuel Ariwachukwu	(Uzbekistan) FK Andijon	Free transfer	11 November 2020	
32	FW	(Nigeria) Kenneth Ikechukwu	(Cyprus) Göcmenköy IYSK	Free transfer	11 November 2020	
6	MF	(Bangladesh) Jamal Bhuyan	(India) Kolkata Mohammedan	End of loan	17 March 2021	

=== Out ===
No.	Pos	Player	Transferred to	Fee	Date	Source
7	FW	(Bangladesh) Jafar Iqbal	(Bangladesh) Dhaka Mohammedan	৳150000 ($1780)	11 December 2020	
9	FW	(Sierra Leone) Fayia Kobba Jr.	Unknown	Free transfer	November 2020	
11	FW	(Bangladesh) Mehebub Hasan Nayan	(Bangladesh) Rahmatganj MFS	Free transfer	October 2020	
15	MF	(Kyrgyzstan) Murolimzhon Akhmedov	(Kyrgyzstan) FC Neftchi Kochkor-Ata	Free transfer	1 August 2020	
23	MF	(Colombia) Deiner Córdoba	Unknown	Free transfer	1 November 2020	
25	DF	(Bangladesh) Nazmul Hossain Akondo	(Bangladesh) Arambagh KS	November 2020	October 2020	
62	FW	(Tajikistan) Jahongir Ergashev	(Tajikistan) FK Khujand	Free transfer	18 July 2020	
99	FW	(Bangladesh) Kafsut Taius	Free Agent	-	October 2020	
26	DF	(Bangladesh) Ariful Islam	(Bangladesh) Sheikh Jamal DC	৳5,00,000 ($5,900)	24 March 2021	
–	FW	(Bangladesh) Shakib Bepary	(Bangladesh) Dhaka Wanderers Club	Free transfer	January 2021	

=== Loans out ===
No.	Pos	Player	Transferred to	Fee	Start date	End date	Source
6	MF	(Bangladesh) Jamal Bhuyan	(India) Kolkata Mohammedan	not disclosed	5 November 2020	17 March 2021	
–	MF	(Bangladesh) Emon Mollah	(Bangladesh) Uttar Baridhara Club	Free	December 2020	End of season	
8	DF	(Rwanda) Emery Bayisenge	(Rwanda) A.S. Kigali	$12,200	24 September 2020	End of season	

Note :

Italic names refer to the players who have transferred from the youth team.

== Pre-season and friendlies ==
29 November 2020 Friendly	Bangladesh Police FC	0–2	Saif Sporting Club	Dhaka
		Report	Kenneth; John

6 December 2020 Friendly	Dhaka Mohammedan	1–3	Saif Sporting Club
	Souleymane (penalty scored)	Report	Sajjad; Arifur; Meraj

13 December 2020 Friendly	Sheikh Russel KC	0–3	Saif Sporting Club
		Report	Rahim; Rafi; Kenneth

10 June 2021 Friendly	Muktijoddha Sangsad KC	1–1	Saif Sporting Club	Dhaka

== Competitions ==
=== Overview ===
Competition	First match	Last match	Starting round	Final position	Record							
Competition	First match	Last match	Starting round	Final position	Pld	W	D	L	GF	GA	GD	Win %
BPL	16 January 2021	14 September 2021	Matchday 1	4th	24	14	2	8	48	37	+11	58.33
Federation Cup	23 December 2020	10 January 2021	Group Stage	Final	6	5	0	1	15	4	+11	83.33
Independence Cup	Cancelled				0	0	0	0	0	0	+0	—
Total					30	19	2	9	63	41	+22	63.33

Last updated: 14 September 2021
Source: GSA

=== Federation Cup ===
==== Group B ====
Pos	Team	Pld	W	D	L	GF	GA	GD	Pts	Qualification
1	Saif Sporting Club	3	3	0	0	10	1	+9	9	Advance to Quarter Finals
2	Arambagh KS	3	1	0	2	4	4	0	3	Advance to Quarter Finals
3	Uttar Baridhara Club	3	2	0	1	6	5	+1	6	
4	Brothers Union	3	0	0	3	1	11	−10	0	

Source: Soccerway

23 December 2020	Saif Sporting Club	3-0	Uttar Baridhara	Dhaka
15:15 BST	Sayed 49' (o.g.); Ikechukwu 64'; Fahim 69'	Report		Stadium: Bangabandhu National Stadium; Referee: Bitu Raj Barua

26 December 2020	Saif Sporting Club	6–1	Brothers Union	Dhaka
20:00 BST	Ikechukwu 20', 64'; Yeasin 36'; Arifur 49'; Maraz 77'; Sazzad 80'	Report	Siyo 90+3' (pen.)	Stadium: Bangabandhu National Stadium; Referee: M. Z. F. Nahid

29 December 2020	Saif Sporting Club	1–0	Arambagh KS	Dhaka
17:45 BST	Arifur 56'	Report		Stadium: Bangabandhu National Stadium; Referee: Alomgir Sarker

==== Knockout phase ====
2 January 2021 Quarter Final	Saif Sporting Club	2–2 (a.e.t.) (7–6 p)	Dhaka Mohammedan	Dhaka
16:00 BST	Ariwachukwu 7'; Ikechukwu 13'	Report	Atiquzzaman 1'; Diabate 44'	Stadium: Bangabandhu National Stadium; Referee: S.M. Jashim Akter
	Penalties
	Ikechukwu (penalty scored); Shahed (penalty scored); Okoli (penalty scored); Yeasin (penalty missed); Ariwachukwu (penalty scored); Rahim (penalty scored); Rahmat (penalty scored); Sirozhiddin (penalty scored)		(penalty scored) Diabate; (penalty missed) Sajib; (penalty scored) Nagata; (penalty scored) Shohag; (penalty scored) Mithu; (penalty scored) Coulidiati; (penalty scored) Bappy; (penalty missed) Atiquzzaman

6 January 2021 Semi Final	Chittagong Abahani	0–3	Saif SC	Dhaka
16:00 BST		Report	Ariwachukwu 8'; Ikechukwu 71'; Arafat 90'	Stadium: Bangabandhu National Stadium; Referee: Jalal Uddin

10 January 2020 Final	Saif SC	0–1	Bashundhara Kings	Dhaka
16:00 BST		Report	Becerra 52'	Stadium: Bangabandhu National Stadium; Referee: Jalal Uddin

=== Premier League ===
==== League table ====
Pos	Team	Pld	W	D	L	GF	GA	GD	Pts	Qualification or relegation
2	Sheikh Jamal DC (Note: Sheikh Jamal cannot qualify for Asian Football Confederation competitions as they were not granted an AFC Cup license for 2022.)	24	15	7	2	53	28	+25	52	
3	Dhaka Abahani (Q)	24	13	8	3	65	29	+36	47	Qualification for AFC Cup qualifying play-offs
4	Saif Sporting Club	24	14	2	8	48	37	+11	44	
5	Chittagong Abahani	24	13	5	6	38	28	+10	44	
6	Dhaka Mohammedan	24	12	7	5	36	25	+11	43	

Source: Soccerway
Rules for classification: 1) Points; 2) Goal difference; 3) Goals scored.
(Q) Qualify for the AFC competition

==== Results summary ====
Overall								Home						Away					
Pld	W	D	L	GF	GA	GD	Pts	W	D	L	GF	GA	GD	W	D	L	GF	GA	GD
24	14	2	8	48	37	+11	44	7	1	4	26	17	+9	7	1	4	22	20	+2

Last updated: 14 September 2021.
Source: Soccerway

==== Results by round ====
Round	1	2	3	4	5	6	7	8	9	10	11	12	13	14	15	16	17	18	19	20	21	22	23	24	25	26	27
Ground	H	A	H	A	H	A	-	H	A	H	H	A	H	A	H	A	H	A	H	-	A	H	A	A	H	-	A
Result	D	W	L	W	L	W	-	W	L	L	W	W	W	D	L	L	W	L	W	-	W	W	W	W	W	-	L
Position	7	5	7	5	5	5	5	5	6	7	7	5	4	4	6	7	6	7	6	7	6	6	6	5	4	4	4

Updated to match(es) played on 14 September 2021. Source: Matches
A = Away; H = Home; W = Win; D = Draw; L = Loss; P = Postponed

==== Matches ====
18 January 2021 Round 1	Saif SC	1–1	Rahmatganj MFS	Dhaka
20:00 BST	Okoli 18' Yeasin (yellow card) 73'	Report	Remi 40' (penalty missed) 59' Nahidul (yellow card) 90+3'	Stadium: Bangabandhu National Stadium; Referee: Anisur Rahman

21 January 2021 Round 2	Dhaka Mohammedan	1–2	Saif SC	Cumilla
15:00 BST	Sohag (yellow card) 34'	Report	Arifur 44' Okoli 45+2' Abid (yellow card) 71' Rahim Uddin (yellow card) 73' Shaeid (yellow card) 85' Shajjad (yellow card) 90'	Referee: Mizanur Rahman

24 January 2021 Round 3	Saif SC	0–1	Chittagong Abahani	Dhaka
18:00 BST	Rahim (yellow card) 76' Shahedul (yellow card) 90+2'	Report	Nixon 24' (yellow card) 49'	Stadium: Bangabandhu National Stadium; Referee: Anisur Rahman

28 January 2021 Round 4	Muktijoddha Sangsad KC	1–2	Saif SC	Dhaka
18:00 BST	Akbarali 25' Bekamenga (yellow card) 50' Sajon (yellow card) 73'	Report	Emmanuel 35' (yellow card) 50' Shahedul (yellow card) 37' Sirozhiddin (yellow card) 62' (goal) 79'	Stadium: Bangabandhu National Stadium; Referee: GM Chowdhury

2 February 2021 Round 5	Saif SC	2–3	Sheikh Jamal DC	Dhaka
16:00 BST	Foysal Fahim 22' John Okoli 45+3' Ikechukwu (yellow card) 84'	Report	Solomon 75' (penalty scored) 90+1 Nurul Absar 76'	Stadium: Bangabandhu National Stadium; Referee: Jalal Uddin

6 February 2021 Round 6	Arambagh KS	2–3	Saif SC	Munshiganj
15:00 BST	O. Faruq 8' Kazi Rahad (yellow card) 17' Shamim Reza (yellow card) 48' B. Smith (yellow card) 61' Ibrahim (yellow card) 79' Chizoba (penalty scored) 90+3	Report	Ikechukwu 6' 59' Rafi (yellow card) 50' Sabuz (yellow card) 66' Shajjad 69'	Stadium: Munshigonj Stadium; Referee: Bituraj Barua

13 February 2021 Round 8	Saif SC	2–1	Sheikh Russel KC	Dhaka
18:00 BST	Shaeid (yellow card) 35' Ikechukwu (yellow card) 55' Riyadul 57' Sirozhiddin 74'	Report	Saiful 20' (o.g.)	Stadium: Bangabandhu National Stadium; Referee: Mizanur Rahman

16 February 2021 Round 9	Abahani Limited Dhaka	2–0	Saif SC	Dhaka
15:30 BST	Raihan (yellow card) 47' Raphael 53' Belfort 66' Shahidul (yellow card) 76'	Report	Sirozhiddin (yellow card) 63'	Stadium: Bangabandhu National Stadium; Referee: Mizanur Rahman

20 February 2021 Round 10	Saif SC	1–2	Bashundhara Kings	Dhaka
15:30 BST	Riyadul (yellow card) 15' Okoli 18' (yellow card) 38' Rahmat (yellow card) 71'	Report	Sabuz 33' (yellow card) 52' Robinho 37' Sushanto (yellow card) 48' Fernansdes (yellow card) 90+1'	Stadium: Bangabandhu National Stadium; Referee: Bituraj Barua

24 February 2021 Round 11	Saif SC	2–1	Uttar Baridhara Club	Dhaka, Bangladesh
16:00 BST	Okoli 44' Shajjad 88'	Report	Arif Hossain 20' Jintu Mia (yellow card) 45+4' Mostafa (yellow card) 59'	Stadium: Bangabandhu National Stadium; Referee: Jalal Uddin

1 March 2021 Round 12	Bangladesh Police FC	1–4	Saif SC	Dhaka
18:00 BST	Jamir Uddin 61'	Report	Riyadul (yellow card) 39' Ikechukwu 44' Okoli 45+2' 87' Sirozhiddin (yellow card) 89' Shajjad 90+4'	Stadium: Bangladesh National Stadium; Referee: Bharat Chandra Gour

5 March 2021 Round 13	Saif SC	4–0	Brothers Union	Dhaka
16:00 BST	Yeasin 1' Ikechukwu 19' Foysal Fahim (yellow card) 22' Okoli 72' 84'	Report		Stadium: Bangabandhu National Stadium; Referee: Bhubon Torofdar

1 May 2021 Round 14	Rahmatganj MFS	0–0	Saif SC	Dhaka
19:00 BST		Report		Stadium: Bangabandhu National Stadium; Referee: Mohammad Jalaluddin

5 May 2021 Round 15	Saif SC	1–2	Mohammedan SC	Dhaka
16:00 BST	Maraz 69'	Report	Y. Ouatching 52' Diabate 83'	Stadium: Bangabandhu National Stadium; Referee: Anisur Rahman

8 May 2021 Round 16	Chittagong Abahani	5-2	Saif SC	Dhaka
16:00 BST	Rakib 18' 47' (yellow card) 30' Nasirul (yellow card) 45' Nixon 49' Brossou 64' Mannaf 82'	Report	Okoli 27' (pen.) 68' Jamal (yellow card) 53' Shajjad (yellow card) 78'	Stadium: Bangabandhu National Stadium; Referee: Arisuz Rahman Sagor

11 May 2021 Round 17	Saif SC	4–1	Muktijoddha Sangsad KC	Dhaka
19:00 BST	Okoli 11' 23' Ikechukwu 45+1' Yeasin 77' (yellow card) 78' Rakhmatullaev (yellow card) 86'	Report	Alamgir Anik (yellow card) 31'; Sajon Mia 44'; Mohiudeen (yellow card) 52'; Royal (yellow card) 64'; Y. Camara (yellow card) 88'	Stadium: Bangabandhu National Stadium; Referee: Jasim Akhter

15 July 2021 Round 18	Sheikh Jamal DC	3–1	Saif SC	Dhaka
16:00 BST	Rezaul (yellow card) 13' Monir Hossain (yellow card) 37' Jobe 45+2' Otabek Validjanov 76' (yellow card) 87'	Report	Okoli (penalty scored) 56	Stadium: Bangabandhu National Stadium; Referee: Bituraj Barua

19 July 2021 Round 19	Saif SC	4–3	Arambagh KS	Dhaka
16:30 BST	Ariwachukwu 30' (yellow card) 43'; Yeasin (yellow card) 48'; Rimon (yellow card) 60'; Maraz 74'; Fahim 76'; Jamal 88'	Report	Abdukadyrov (penalty scored) 37'; Babu (yellow card) 43'; Kholmurodov (penalty scored) 78'; Arafat Mia 84'	Stadium: Bangabandhu National Stadium; Referee: Mohamad Alamgir

10 August 2021 Round 21	Sheikh Russel KC	2–4	Saif SC	Dhaka
16:00 BST	Mohammad Abdullah (penalty missed) 14'; Obi Moneke 14' 63'	Report	Bablu 9' (o.g.); Ikechukwu 27' 52'; Okoli 40'; Sirojiddin (yellow card) 42'	Stadium: Bangabandhu National Stadium; Referee: Mizanur Rahman

13 August 2021 Round 22	Saif SC	3–2	Abahani Limited Dhaka	Dhaka
16:00 BST	Ikechukwu 43' 81'; Okoli 45+2'; Riyadul Hasan Rafi (yellow card) 50'; Rimon (yellow card) 72'	Report	Saad Uddin (yellow card) 15'; Masih Saighani (yellow card) 46'; Kervens Belfort 76'; Jewel Rana 78'; Ridoy (yellow card) 84'	Stadium: Bangabandhu National Stadium; Referee: Mohammed Jalal Uddin

14 September 2021 Round 23	Bashundhara Kings	3–0	Saif SC	Dhaka
16:00 BST (UTC+6)	Eleta 54' 63'; Tariq (yellow card) 70'; Robinho 80'	Report	Rafi (yellow card) 17'	Stadium: Bangabandhu National Stadium; Referee: Anisur Rahman
Note: This match was rescheduled from August to September due to Bashundhara Kings's 2021 AFC Cup group stage matches.

19 August 2021 Round 24	Uttar Baridhara Club	1–3	Saif SC	Dhaka
16:00 BST	S. Rana (yellow card) 40'; M. Kahraba (yellow card) 64'; Maruf Ahmed 75'	Report	Rimon (yellow card) 41'; Okoli 28' (yellow card) 64' (goal) 90+5'; Ikechukwu 66'	Stadium: Bangabandhu National Stadium; Referee: Mahmud Zamal Farouqee Nahid

24 August 2021 Round 25	Saif SC	2–0	Police FC	Dhaka
16:00 BST	Fahim 29' (yellow card) 60'; Ikechukwu 90'	Report		Stadium: Bangabandhu National Stadium; Referee: Alomgir Sarker

27 August 2021 Round 26	Brothers Union	0–1	Saif SC	Dhaka
18:15 BST	Ahsanur (yellow card) 69'; Furqatjon (yellow card) 77'; Uttom Roy (yellow card) 90+3'	Report	Maraz 56'	Stadium: Bangabandhu National Stadium; Referee: Mahmud Zamal Farouqee Nahid

== Statistics ==
=== Goals ===
As of matches played till 14 September 2021

Rank	Player	Position	Total	BPL	Federation Cup	Independence Cup
1	(Nigeria) John Okoli	MF	18	18	0	0
2	(Nigeria) Kenneth Ikechukwu	FW	16	11	5	0
3	(Bangladesh) Sazzad Hossain	MF	4	3	1	0
3	(Bangladesh) Yeasin Arafat	DF	4	2	2	0
3	(Bangladesh) Foysal Ahmed Fahim	FW	4	3	1	0
3	(Bangladesh) Maraz Hossain	FW	4	3	1	0
3	(Nigeria) Emmanuel Ariwachukwu	DF	4	2	2	0
8	(Bangladesh) Arifur Rahman	FW	3	1	2	0
9	(Uzbekistan) Sirozhiddin Rakhmatullaev	MF	2	2	0	0
10	(Bangladesh) Riyadul Hasan Rafi	DF	1	1	0	0
10	(Bangladesh) Jamal Bhuyan	MF	1	1	0	0
Own goals			2	1	1	0
Total			63	48	15	0
