= Moin Ahmed =

Pakistani footballer

Personal information
- Date of birth: 28 November 2003 (age 22)
- Place of birth: Karachi, Pakistan
- Position: Winger

Team information
- Current team: Dhaka Abahani

Youth career
- Madhu Muhammadan

Senior career*
Years	Team	Apps	(Gls)
2020–2022	Masha United		
2022–	Khan Research Laboratories		
2026–	→ Dhaka Abahani (loan)		

International career^{‡}
2018–2019	Pakistan U15	7	(5)
2023–	Pakistan U23	3	(0)
2023–	Pakistan	6	(0)
- * Club domestic league appearances and goals as of 23:00, 10 November 2023 (UTC) ‡ National team caps and goals as of 23:00, 31 March 2026 (UTC)

Moin Ahmed (born 28 November 2003) is a Pakistani footballer who plays as a forward for Bangladesh Football League club Dhaka Abahani and the Pakistan national team.

== Club career ==
Ahmed started his football career with Karachi based club Madhu Muhammadan. In 2020 Ahmed was a member of Masha United. By 2022, Ahmed had joined departmental side Khan Research Laboratories of the Pakistan Premier League. He has simultaneously been associated with his club Madhu Muhammadan.

On 4 September 2026, Ahmed joined Dhaka Abahani for the 2026–27 Bangladesh Football League, becoming the first ever Pakistani footballer to play for the club.

== International career ==
In October 2018, Ahmed was called up by the Pakistan under-15 team for the 2018 SAFF U-15 Championship held in Nepal. He scored three goals in the tournament against Bhutan and Nepal. His team finishing as runners-up following a penalty shootout in the final against Bangladesh. He also participated in the 2020 AFC U-16 Championship qualification in 2019.

In March 2023, Ahmed was called up to the Pakistan national team for a friendly against the Maldives. On 21 March 2023, he made his international debut in an eventual 0–1 defeat to the Maldives.

== Career statistics ==
=== International ===
As of 31 March 2026

Appearances and goals by national team and year
National team	Year	Apps	Goals
Pakistan	2023	3	0
Pakistan	2024	1	0
Pakistan	2025	1	0
Pakistan	2026	1	0
Total		6	0
