= 2018 SAFF U-15 Championship =

Football competition

Tournament details
- Host country: Nepal
- Dates: 25 October – 3 November
- Teams: 6 (from 1 confederation)
- Venue: 1 (in Lalitpur host cities)

Final positions
- Champions: Bangladesh (2nd title)
- Runners-up: Pakistan
- Third place: India
- Fourth place: Nepal

Tournament statistics
- Matches played: 10
- Goals scored: 47 (4.7 per match)
- Attendance: 15,144 (1,514 per match)
- Top scorer: (Bangladesh) Nihat Jaman Ucchash (4 Goals)
- Best player: (Pakistan) Haseeb Khan
- Fair play award: Bangladesh
- All statistics correct as of 30 April 2019.

The 2018 SAFF U-15 Championship was the fifth edition of the SAFF U-15 Championship, an international football competition for men's under-15 national teams organized by SAFF. The tournament was hosted by Nepal from October 25 to November 3, 2018, at ANFA Complex in Lalitpur, Nepal. Six out of seven teams from the region took part, as Sri Lanka later withdrew their team, and the teams were divided into two groups. On 3 November 2018, Bangladesh edged out Pakistan in a close match decided in a penalty shootout to claim their second SAFF title.

== Host selection ==
A draw for tournament ceremony was held on 13 September 2018 at conference room of Bangladesh Football Federation. BFF general secretary Abu Naeem Shohag, chairman of the BFF Media Committee Amirul Islam Babu and Mindu Dorji, the deputy general secretary of Bhutan Football Federation was among those present.

Initially all of seven countries team participated for the draw, two groups A and B were made, A consisted of Nepal, Bangladesh, Maldives and Pakistan and group B consisted of India, Bhutan and Sri Lanka

But later Sri Lanka withdrew its team from the tournament and the groups were redefined.

Group A	Group B
Nepal; Bangladesh; Maldives; Pakistan ‡	India; Bhutan; Sri Lanka †; Pakistan

† Sri Lanka withdrew before tournament
‡ Pakistan drawn to Group B, thus both the groups redefined

== Squads ==
Players born on or after 1 January 2003 were eligible to compete in the tournament. Each team had to register a squad of minimum 18 players and maximum 23 players, minimum three of whom had to be goalkeepers.

== Participating teams ==
Team	Appearances in the SAFF U-15 Championship	Previous best performance
Bangladesh	5th	Champions (2015), (2018)
Bhutan	3rd	Fourth Place
India	5th	Champions (2013, 2017)
Maldives	4th	Group Stage
Nepal (Host)	5th	Runners-up (2013, 2017)
Pakistan	3rd	Champions (2011)

== Venues ==
Lalitpur
ANFA Complex
Capacity: 6,000

== Match officials ==
Referees

- Sudish Kumar Pandey (Nepal)
- Bhubon Mohon Tarafder (Bangladesh)
- Zaeem Ali (Maldives)
- Pema Tshewang (Bhutan)
- Muhammad Ahmad Rauf (Pakistan)
- Harish Kundu (India)

Assistant Referees

- Yunal Malla (Nepal)
- Sk Ikball Alam (Bangladesh)
- Jaufar Rasheed (Maldives)
- Yonten Chophel (Bhutan)
- Dilawar Khan (Pakistan)
- Kishan Joshi (India)

== Group stage ==
- All matches were played at Lalitpur, Nepal.
- Times listed are UTC+05:45.

Key to colours in group tables
Group winners and runners-up advance to the semi-finals

=== Group A ===
Pos	Team	Pld	W	D	L	GF	GA	GD	Pts	Status
1	Bangladesh	2	2	0	0	11	1	+10	6	Qualified for Knockout stage
2	Nepal (H)	2	1	0	1	5	2	+3	3	Qualified for Knockout stage
3	Maldives	2	0	0	2	0	13	−13	0	

Source: SAFF
(H) Hosts

25 October 2018
14:30 UTC+5:45

Nepal	4–0	Maldives
Jaan Limbu 27'; Namas Thapa Magar 35'; Sasank Bohora 63'; Dipesh Rai 68'	SAFF

ANFA Complex, Lalitpur, Nepal
Attendance: 2941
Referee: Muhammad Ahmad Rauf (Pakistan)

27 October 2018
14:30 UTC+5:45

Bangladesh	9–0	Maldives
Nihat Jaman Ucchash 11', 19', 23', 46'; Mehedi Hassan 44'; Rasel Ahmed 47', 66'; Ashikur Rahman 80', 90+5'	SAFF

ANFA Complex, Lalitpur, Nepal
Attendance: 2000
Referee: Pema Tshewang (Bhutan)

29 October 2018
14:30 UTC+5:45

Bangladesh	2–1	Nepal
Ibne Ahad Sakil 2'; Rajon Howladar 46'	SAFF	Jaan Limbu 36'

ANFA Complex, Lalitpur, Nepal
Attendance: 1968
Referee: Harish Kundu (India)

=== Group B ===
Pos	Team	Pld	W	D	L	GF	GA	GD	Pts	Status
1	Pakistan	2	2	0	0	6	1	+5	6	Qualified for Knockout stage
2	India	2	1	0	1	5	2	+3	3	Qualified for Knockout stage
3	Bhutan	2	0	0	2	0	8	−8	0	

Source: SAFF

25 October 2018
11:30 UTC+5:45

India	1–2	Pakistan
Vanlalruatfela Thlacheu 53'	SAFF AIFF	Adnan Justin 36'; Wasif 85'

ANFA Complex, Lalitpur, Nepal
Attendance: 2807
Referee: Bhubon Mohon Tarafder (Bangladesh)

27 October 2018
11:30 UTC+5:45

Bhutan	0–4	Pakistan
	SAFF	Mudassar Nazar 20'; Iftikar Ahmed 23'; Moin Ahmed 29', 42'

ANFA Complex, Lalitpur, Nepal
Attendance: 1506
Referee: Zaeem Ali (Maldives)

29 October 2018
10:30 UTC+5:45

Bhutan	0–4	India
	SAFF AIFF	Shubho Paul 4' (pen.), 83'; Kushang Subba 66'; Aman Xalxo 89'

ANFA Complex, Lalitpur, Nepal
Attendance: 3019
Referee: Sudish Kumar Pandey (Nepal)

== Bracket ==
Semi-finals
1 November – ANFA Complex
Bangladesh (p)	1 (4)
India	1 (2)
1 November – ANFA Complex
Pakistan	4
Nepal	0

Final
3 November – ANFA Complex
Bangladesh (p)	1 (3)
Pakistan	1 (2)
Third Place
3 November – ANFA Complex
India	1
Nepal	0

== Knockout stage ==
- All matches will be played at Lalitpur, Nepal.
- Times listed are UTC+05:45

=== Semi-finals ===
1 November 2018
10:30 UTC+5:45

Bangladesh	1–1	India
Ashikur Rahman 90+3' (pen.)	SAFF AIFF	Harsh Patre 17'
Penalties
Tauhidul Riday (penalty scored); Raja Ansari (penalty scored); Kamran Raju (penalty scored); Rostom Mia (penalty scored)	4–2	(penalty missed) Harsh Patre; (penalty missed) Lalrampana Pautu; (penalty scored) Kushang Subba; (penalty scored) Fredy Chawngthansanga

ANFA Complex, Lalitpur, Nepal
Attendance: 1944
Referee: Zaeem Ali (Maldives)

1 November 2018
14:30 UTC+5:45

Pakistan	4–0	Nepal
Jaan Limbu 54' (o.g.); Mohib Ullah 59' (pen.), 68' (pen.); Moin Ahmed 77'	SAFF

ANFA Complex, Lalitpur, Nepal
Attendance: 1632
Referee: Pema Tshewang (Bhutan)

=== Third place ===
3 November 2018
10:30 UTC+5:45

India	1–0	Nepal
Vanlalruatfela Thlacheu 18'	SAFF AIFF

ANFA Complex, Lalitpur, Nepal
Attendance: 914
Referee: Bhubon Mohon Tarafder (Bangladesh)

=== Final ===
3 November 2018
14:30 UTC+5:45

Bangladesh	1–1	Pakistan
Haseeb Khan 25' (o.g.)	Report	Mohib Ullah 54' (pen.)
Penalties
Rajon Howladar (penalty missed); Tauhidul Islam Riday (penalty scored); Raja Ansari (penalty scored); Rostom Mia (penalty scored); Md. Rabi Ul Islam (penalty missed)	3–2	(penalty missed) Junaid Shah; (penalty missed) Adnan Justin; (penalty scored) Mohib Ullah; (penalty scored) Wasif; (penalty missed) Mudassar Nazar

ANFA Complex, Lalitpur, Nepal
Attendance: 6413
Referee: Sudish Kumar Pandey (Nepal)

== Winner ==
2018 SAFF U-15 Championship champions

Bangladesh
Second title

== Awards ==
The following awards were given for the 2018 SAFF U-15 Championship.

Fair Play Award	Most Valuable Player	Golden Boot Award
Bangladesh	(Pakistan) Haseeb Khan	(Bangladesh) Nihat Jaman Ucchash

== Goalscorers ==
There were 47 goals scored in 10 matches, for an average of 4.7 goals per match.

4 goals

- (Bangladesh) Nihat Jaman Ucchash

3 goals

- (Bangladesh) Md Ashikur Rahman
- (Pakistan) Moin Ahmed
- (Pakistan) Mohib Ullah

2 goals

- (Bangladesh) Rasel Ahmed
- (India) Shubho Paul
- (India) Thlacheu Vanlalruatfela
- (Nepal) Jaan Limbu
- (Pakistan) Mudassar Nazar

1 goal

- (Bangladesh) Ibne Ahad Sakil
- (Bangladesh) Rajon Howladar
- (Bangladesh) Nafiz Basher
- (India) Harsh Shailesh Patre
- (India) Subba Kushang
- (India) Aman Xalxo
- (Nepal) Namas Thapa Magar
- (Nepal) Sasank Bohora
- (Nepal) Dipesh Rai
- (Pakistan) Adnan Justin
- (Pakistan) Iftikar Ahmed
- (Pakistan) Wasif
