= Tutul Hossain Badsha =

Bangladeshi footballer (born 1999)

Badsha
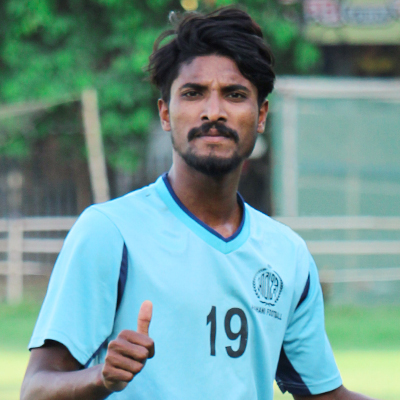
- Badsha with Abahani Limited Dhaka in 2019

Personal information
- Full name: Mohammad Tutul Hossain Badsha
- Date of birth: 12 August 1999 (age 27)
- Place of birth: Joypurhat, Bangladesh
- Height: 1.81 m (5 ft 11 1/2 in)
- Position: Centre-back

Team information
- Current team: Brothers Union
- Number: 73

Youth career
- 2012–2013: Dhaka Abahani
- 2012: → Khilgaon FA (loan)

Senior career*
Years	Team	Apps	(Gls)
2013–2022	Dhaka Abahani	84	(0)
2022–2025	Bashundhara Kings	25	(0)
2025–	Brothers Union	0	(0)

International career^{‡}
2013–2017	Bangladesh U20	10	(0)
2017–2021	Bangladesh U23	17	(1)
2018–	Bangladesh	25	(0)
Medal record
Representing Bangladesh
SAFF U-18 Championship
Runner-up	2017 Bhutan	Team
South Asian Games
Bronze medal – third place	2019 Nepal
- * Club domestic league appearances and goals as of 10 January 2025 ‡ National team caps and goals as of 27 September 2022

Tutul Hossain Badsha (12 August 1999) is a Bangladeshi professional footballer who plays as a centre-back for Bangladesh Football League club Brothers Union and the Bangladesh national team.

== Club statistics ==
=== Early career & European trial ===
Badsha joined Dhanmondi giants Abahani Limited Dhaka in 2012, at the age of 13. While still training with the Abahani youth team, Badsha participated in the 2012 Pioneer League with Khilgaon FA and went onto win the league title while making only a couple of appearances for the club. The following year, he returned to Abahani and participated in the BFF U-18 Football Tournament, before making his senior team breakthrough.

On 21 July 2014, a 17 year old Badsha got the opportunity to trial for Belgian First Division A club Anderlecht, however, his European trial did not come to fruition due to passport issues. Although Badsha had only made a single league appearance before the offer, Bangladesh national team's head coach at the time Lodewijk de Kruif and assistant coach Rene Koster initially made the arrangements possible after Badsha caught the attention of the Dutch coaches during the 2014 AFC U-19 Championship qualifiers.

=== Abahani Limited Dhaka ===
After joining Abahani in 2012, Badsha made his first appearance during the 2013–14 season by coming on as a substitute, however, he was not a regular face in the team, due to there being more experienced defenders at his position at the time. Badsha, finally got a few appearances after veteran defenders Atiqur Rahman Meshu and Mohammed Ariful Islam parted ways with the club.

In the 2017–18 season, Badhsa became a regular for Abahani in defense due to his good performances while partnering veteran center back and former Bangladesh national team captain, Nasiruddin Chowdhury, the same season he won the Bangladesh Football League title with the club, making 21 league appearances during the course of the season. Badsha also created a strong defensive partnership with Afghanistan international Masih Saighani, helping Abahani become the first Bangladeshi club to reach the knockout-stages of the 2019 AFC Cup.

At the start of the 2021–222 season, he paired up with Iranian Milad Sheykh Soleimani, and kept a stern defense as Abahani won the domestic cup double. However, due to injury, Badsha could not hold onto his good form during the league campaign, as Abahani lost the championship to Bashundhara Kings.

On 6 August 2022, after continuous speculation, Badsha announced his departure from his boyhood club Abahani, through a Facebook post. He spent 10 years at the club making more than a century off appearances for Abahani in all competitions and also won all three domestic trophies along the way.

=== Bashundhara Kings ===
In August 2022, Badsha announced Bashundhara Kings as his new destinations.

== International career ==
In 2017, Badsha captained the Bangladesh U18 team to a runners-up position at the 2017 SAFF U-18 Championship. He later captained the Bangladesh U23 national team during their disappointing 2022 AFC U-23 Asian Cup qualifying campaign. The team conceded a total of 10 goals during the 3 qualifying matches.

Badsha made his senior debut for Bangladesh national team on 27 March 2018 against Laos in a FIFA international friendly match.

== Career statistics ==
=== Club ===
As of 3 July 2022.

Club	Season	League			Domestic Cup (Note: Appearance(s) in Bangladesh Federation Cup)		Other (Note: Appearance(s) in Bangladesh Independence Cup)		Continental		Total	
Club	Season	Division	Apps	Goals	Apps	Goals	Apps	Goals	Apps	Goals	Apps	Goals
Abahani Limited Dhaka	2013–14	Bangladesh Football League	1	0	0	0	0	0	0	0	1	0
Abahani Limited Dhaka	2014–15	Bangladesh Football League	0	0	0	0	—		—		0	0
Abahani Limited Dhaka	2016	Bangladesh Football League	8	0	0	0	0	0	5 (Note: Appearance(s) in AFC Cup)	0	13	0
Abahani Limited Dhaka	2017–18	Bangladesh Football League	21	0	3	0	2	0	4	0	30	0
Abahani Limited Dhaka	2018–19	Bangladesh Football League	20	0	3	0	3	0	5	0	31	0
Abahani Limited Dhaka	2019–20	Bangladesh Football League	2	0	1	0	—		1	0	4	0
Abahani Limited Dhaka	2020–21	Bangladesh Football League	18	0	4	0	—		0	0	22	0
Abahani Limited Dhaka	2021–22	Bangladesh Football League	14	0	4	0	6	0	1	0	25	0
Career total			84	0	15	0	11	0	16	0	126	0

=== International apps ===
As of 14 June 2022.

Bangladesh
Year	Apps	Goals
2018	8	0
2019	3	0
2020	0	0
2021	6	0
2022	6	0
Total	23	0

=== International goals ===
==== Youth ====
Scores and results list Bangladesh's goal tally first.

No.	Date	Venue	Opponent	Score	Result	Competition
1.	26 March 2019	APF Stadium, Isa Town, Bahrain	Sri Lanka	2–0	2–0	2020 AFC U-23 Championship qualifiers

== Honours ==
Khilgaon FA

- Pioneer Football League: 2012

Abahani Limited Dhaka

- Bangladesh Football League: 2017–18; runner-up: 2021–22, 2018–19
- Independence Cup: 2021–22
- Federation Cup: 2021–22, 2018, 2017

Bashundhara Kings

- Bangladesh Football League: 2022–23, 2023–24
- Independence Cup: 2022–23, 2023–24
- Federation Cup third place: 2022–23
