= Sazzad Hossain =

Bangladeshi footballer

Personal information
- Full name: Mohamed Sazzad Hossain Shakil
- Date of birth: 18 January 1995 (age 31)
- Place of birth: Chittagong, Bangladesh
- Height: 1.75 m (5 ft 9 in)
- Positions: Centre forward; right winger

Team information
- Current team: Fortis
- Number: 9

Senior career*
Years	Team	Apps	(Gls)
2016–2022	Saif SC	67	(9)
2022–2023	Mohammedan SC	12	(3)
2023–2024	Sheikh Jamal DC	12	(2)
2024–2025	Brothers Union	13	(2)
2025–	Fortis	1	(0)

International career^{‡}
2022–	Bangladesh	6	(1)
- * Club domestic league appearances and goals as of 29 May 2024 ‡ National team caps and goals as of 27 September 2025

Sazzad Hossain (Bengali: সাজ্জাদ হোসেন; born 18 Jan 1995) is a Bangladeshi professional footballer who plays as a forward or as a right winger for Bangladesh Football League club Brothers Union and the Bangladesh national team.

== Club career ==
=== Early years ===
Sazzad started his football career by signing a contract worth Tk 10,000 for Patiya Upazila of Chittagong. During his time in Chittagong, Sazzad played for Patiya Brothers Union and regularly practiced at the Brothers Union field, where the late Mahibullah Chowdhury, president of Patiya Brothers Union saw Sazzad's talent and gave him a chance to play. He went on to play in the Chittagong Premier Division and Second Division Leagues before playing for Kadamtala Sangsad in the Dhaka Second Division Football League in 2015.

In 2016, Patiya Upazila Football Club played a friendly match with Chittagong Abahani and during the game Sazzad entered the box twice. Although he did not get a goal that day, Arman Aziz, the former national team midfielder, was impressed by Sazzad's game, and after the game he joined the newly formed Saif SC in the Bangladesh Championship League, the same year.

=== Saif SC ===
On 29 October 2016, Sazzad scored the third goal in a 3–1 victory over T & T Club, as Saif SC played their first official match During his first season at the club, Saif SC earned promotion to the top-tier, and Sazzad signed a four-year contract extension the following year. Although he did not feature for Saif SC during their inaugural season at the top flight, Sazzad made 10 appearances the next year scoring his first Bangladesh Premier League goal against Muktijoddha SKC, on 1 August 2019. On 8 February 2021, Sazzad scored a stunning a solo goal during a 3–2 win over Arambagh KS, earning him nationwide praise.

In May 2022, Sazzad got his first international call up after impressing during the first half of the 2021–22 Bangladesh Premier League, scoring 4 goals in 12 league matches.

== International career ==
After veteran striker Nabib Newaj Jibon, was suspended from the national team due to disciplinary issues, coach Javier Cabrera called up Sazzad as a replacement striker for the 2023 AFC Asian Cup qualification – third round & a practice game against Indonesia.

On 1 June 2022, Sazzad made his international debut for the Bangladesh national football team during a FIFA Friendly, against Indonesia.

== Personal life ==
Before making it as a professional footballer, Sazzad worked at a NGO in the morning with a salary of Tk 2000 per month and then trained in the afternoon with his local club, due to pressure from his parents. However, he left the job within two months after joining.

In 2017, Sazzad could not play a single match for Saif SC, his father Kabir Ahmed was suffering from cancer the same year. Everyone depended on Sazzad's earnings from his playing career. However, coach Kim Grant did not let him make a single appearance during the entire season. On 21 April 2017, his father Kabir Ahmed died, as Sazzad was not able to pay the expensive treatment fees. Regarding his father's death, Sazzad said "I thought, if the coach had given me a chance, maybe a big club would have taken me after seeing my game. Father's treatment money would have been collected. But I never gave up hope. I kept trying."

== Career statistics ==
=== Club ===
As of 7 May 2022.

Club	Season	League			Cup (Note: Appearance(s) in Bangladesh Federation Cup)		Other (Note: Appearance(s) in Bangladesh Independence Cup)		Continental		Total	
Club	Season	Division	Apps	Goals	Apps	Goals	Apps	Goals	Apps	Goals	Apps	Goals
Saif SC	2016–17	Bangladesh Championship League	14	1	—		—		—		14	1
Saif SC	2017–18	Bangladesh Football League	0	0	0	0	0	0	0 (Note: Appearance(s) in AFC Cup)	0	0	0
Saif SC	2018–19	Bangladesh Football League	12	1	3	1	3	0	—		18	2
Saif SC	2019–20	Bangladesh Football League	2	0	2	0	—		—		4	0
Saif SC	2020–21	Bangladesh Football League	20	3	2	1	—		—		22	4
Saif SC	2021–22	Bangladesh Football League	19	4	4	1	4	1	—		27	6
Career total			67	9	11	3	7	1	0	0	85	13

=== International ===
As of match played 27 September 2022.

Bangladesh national team
Year	Apps	Goals
2022	6	1
Total	6	1

=== International goals ===
==== Senior team ====
Scores and results list Bangladesh's goal tally first.

No.	Date	Venue	Opponent	Score	Result	Competition	ref
1.	27 September 2022	Dasharath Rangasala, Kathmandu, Nepal	Nepal	1–3	1–3	Friendly	

== Honours ==
Mohammedan SC

- Federation Cup: 2022–23
