= Andrew Marveggio =

Australian soccer player (born 1992)

Personal information
- Full name: Andrew Marveggio
- Date of birth: 22 April 1992 (age 34)
- Place of birth: Adelaide, Australia
- Height: 1.70 m (5 ft 7 in)
- Positions: Defensive midfielder; defender

Youth career
- Adelaide City

Senior career*
Years	Team	Apps	(Gls)
2009–2011	Adelaide City	31	(2)
2011–2014	Telstar	21	(0)
2014–2015	Fortuna Sittard	18	(0)
2016	FC Strausberg	11	(2)
2016–2017	VfV 06 Hildesheim	31	(1)
2017–2018	TSG Neustrelitz	18	(2)
2018	Zemun	0	(0)
2018–2020	Mačva Šabac	5	(0)
2020	Bokelj	19	(0)
2021–2021	Petrovac	11	(0)
2021–2022	Mornar		
2022–2023	FK Jezero	22	(0)
2023	Sheikh Russel KC	10	(0)
2023	Adelaide City	4	(0)
2024	Adelaide Olympic	10	(1)
- * Club domestic league appearances and goals as of 18 September 2024

Andrew Marveggio (born 22 April 1992) is an Australian footballer who plays as a defensive midfielder for Adelaide City in the National Premier Leagues. Besides Australia, he has played in the Netherlands, Germany, Serbia, and Montenegro.

== Club career ==
=== Telstar ===
Marveggio made his debut for Telstar in the Eerste Divisie on 10 March 2012 against Go Ahead Eagles.

=== Fortuna Sittard ===
After three seasons at Telstar, in July 2014 it was announced Marveggio had signed a one-year deal with Fortuna Sittard.

=== FC Strausberg ===
At the start of 2016 Marveggio moved into German football, joining struggling FC Strausberg during the Oberliga's winter break and scoring 2 goals in 11 appearances during the remainder of the season.

=== VfV 06 Hildesheim ===
In the summer of 2016 Marveggio moved up a division by accompanying departing Strausberg-coach Mario Block to Regionalliga Nord club VfV Hildesheim, signing a contract for the 2016–2017 season. He made his Regionalliga Nord debut in the league opening round, as a defender in the starting line up against VfB Lübeck. He finished his first Regionalliga season having played in 31 out of 34 league games, and having appeared 30 times in the starting line up.

=== Mačva Šabac ===
Marveggio debuted in the Serbian SuperLiga on 6 October 2018, as substitute in the game against OFK Bačka.
