= Nihat Jaman Ucchash =

Bangladeshi footballer

Personal information
- Full name: Nihat Jaman Ucchash
- Date of birth: 24 September 2003 (age 23)
- Place of birth: Kurigram, Bangladesh
- Height: 1.78 m (5 ft 10 in)
- Position: Left winger

Team information
- Current team: Rahmatganj MFS
- Number: 99

Youth career
- 2015–2020: BKSP
- 2017: Kingstar SC

Senior career*
Years	Team	Apps	(Gls)
2018–2019	BKSP	9	(2)
2019–2020	Bashundhara Kings	0	(0)
2020–2021	Arambagh KS	20	(6)
2021–2022	Saif SC	10	(0)
2022–2024	Sheikh Russel KC	27	(1)
2024–	Rahmatganj MFS	0	(0)

International career
2018	Bangladesh U15	7	(6)
2019	Bangladesh U19	2	(0)
Medal record
Men's football
Representing Bangladesh
SAFF U-17 Championship
Winner	2018 Nepal	Team
SAFF U-20 Championship
Runner-up	2019 Nepal	Team
- * Club domestic league appearances and goals as of 17 May 2024

Nihat Jaman Ucchash (Bengali: নিহাত জামান উচ্ছ্বাস; born 24 September 2003) is a Bangladeshi professional footballer who plays as a forward for Bangladesh Premier League club Rahmatganj MFS. A versatile player, he can operate as a centre forward, attacking midfielder or left winger.

== Club career ==
=== Early career ===
Born in Raiganj, a small village of Kurigram, Ucchas started his football career by taking part in the Bangabandhu Gold Cup primary school tournament. In 2015, with the aim of fulfilling his father's dream, Ucchas successfully attended trials in the Bangladesh Krira Shikkha Protishtan (BKSP) in Khulna, where along with football training he continued his education. The same year, he played for the BKSP U14 team in India at the Subroto Cup. After two years in Khulna, he enrolled to the main branch, in Savar. In 2017, Ucchas participated in the Pioneer Football League with eventual champions Kingstar Sporting Club.

In 2018, while still training with BKSP, Uccchas was selected for the Bangladesh U-15 team by coach Mustafa Anwar Parvez. The following year, he participated in the 2018–19 Dhaka Second Division League with BKSP. Uchhas's performance with Bangladesh at youth level caught the attention of Bashundhara Kings president Imrul Hasan, who gave the BKSP student his first professional contract, in November 2019. However, Ucchas did not make a single appearance for the club during his year-long stint there.

=== Arambagh KS ===
In 2020, Ucchash moved to Arambagh KS in the Bangladesh Premier League. On 26 December 2020, he scored his first goal for the club in a 2–3 defeat to Uttar Baridhara during the group-stages of the 2020 Federation Cup. On 17 February 2021, he made his league debut for the club in an opening day 0–3 defeat to Mohammedan SC. He scored his first league goal during a 1–6 defeat to his former club, Bashundhara Kings. In the following match on 20 February 2021, he found the net in a 4–4 draw with Uttar Baridhara. On 25 February 2021, Ucchash scored for the third consecutive game, this time netting as his team went down 1–2 defeat to Police FC. Ucchash continued to display his scoring prowess by finding the net in the following two games against Brothers Union and Rahmatganj MFS, respectively. This saw him register goals for five consecutive league games. On 11 May 2021, he scored his final goal of the season, coming in a 3–1 victory over Sheikh Jamal Dhanmondi Club. He received the BPL Emerging Player of the Season Award even as Arambagh were relegated from the top-tier.

=== Saif Sporting Club ===
On 10 December 2021, Ucchash made his debut for Saif Sporting Club by coming on as a substitute against newly promoted side Swadhinata KS during the quarter-finals of the 2021 Independence Cup. He was also able to register an assist, as Saif won the game 2–0.

=== Sheikh Russel KC ===
In 2022, Ucchash joined Sheikh Russel KC following the disbandment of Saif Sporting Club. On 17 November 2022, he made his competitive debut for the club by coming on as a 89th-minute substitute against Bangladesh Navy in the 2022 Independence Cup, in a match which Sheikh Russel won 2–0. On 24 January 2023, he scored his first goal during a 1–0 victory over Police FC in the 2022–23 Federation Cup. The win eventually confirmed Sheikh Russel's place in the knockout stages of the tournament. On 8 April 2023, Ucchash netted his first league goal for the club which also came against Police in a 3–1 victory.

== International career ==
=== Youth ===
In 2018, Ucchash debuted for the Bangladesh U15 team against Maldives U17 in the 2018 SAFF U-15 Championship. He scored four goals as Bangladesh thrashed their opponents 9–0 in the opening matchday. He later received the tournament's Golden Boot Award, as Bangladesh were crowned champions. He scored a brace against Maldives U15 in the 2019 UEFA Assist U-15 Development Tournament, as Bangladesh finished tournament runners-up.

In 2019, Ucchash appeared for the eventual runners-up Bangladesh U19 team in the 2019 SAFF U-18 Championship, held in Kathmandu, Nepal. He later represented Bangladesh in the 2019 Three Nations U19 Tournament which was arranged by the Qatar Football Association. Ucchash was also included in the team for the 2020 AFC U-19 Championship qualifiers.

In 2021, Ucchash was selected in the preliminary squad for the 2022 AFC U-23 Asian Cup qualifiers, held in Uzbekistan. However, was left out of the final squad due to passport problems. In 2023, he returned to the Bangladesh U23 team as part of the preliminary selected players for the 2024 AFC U-23 Asian Cup qualifiers.

== Career statistics ==
=== Club ===
As of 22 July 2023.

Appearances and goals by club, season and competition
Club	Season	League			Domestic Cup (Note: Appearance(s) in Bangladesh Federation Cup)		Other (Note: Appearance(s) in Bangladesh Independence Cup)		Continental		Total	
Club	Season	Division	Apps	Goals	Apps	Goals	Apps	Goals	Apps	Goals	Apps	Goals
BKSP	2018–19	Dhaka Second Division League	9	2	—		—		—		9	2
Bashundhara Kings	2019–20	Bangladesh Premier League	0	0	0	0	—		0	0	0	0
Arambagh KS	2020–21	Bangladesh Premier League	20	6	3	1	—		—		23	7
Saif SC	2021–22	Bangladesh Premier League	10	0	—		2	0	—		12	0
Sheikh Russel KC	2022–23	Bangladesh Premier League	19	1	3	1	3	0	—		25	2
Sheikh Russel KC	2023–24	Bangladesh Premier League	0	0	0	0	0	0	—		0	0
Sheikh Russel KC	Sheikh Russel KC total		19	1	3	1	3	0	0	0	25	2
Career total			58	9	6	1	5	0	0	0	69	10

=== International goals ===
==== Youth ====
Scores and results list Bangladesh's goal tally first.

No.	Date	Venue	Opponent	Score	Result	Competition
1.	27 October 2018	ANFA Complex, Lalitpur, Nepal	Maldives	1–0	9–0	2018 SAFF U-15 Championship
2.	27 October 2018	ANFA Complex, Lalitpur, Nepal	Maldives	2–0	9–0	2018 SAFF U-15 Championship
3.	27 October 2018	ANFA Complex, Lalitpur, Nepal	Maldives	3–0	9–0	2018 SAFF U-15 Championship
4.	27 October 2018	ANFA Complex, Lalitpur, Nepal	Maldives	5–0	9–0	2018 SAFF U-15 Championship
5.	14 December 2018	Chang Arena, Buriram, Thailand	Maldives	5–0	10–0	UEFA Assist U-15 Development Tournament
6.	14 December 2018	Chang Arena, Buriram, Thailand	Maldives	6–0	10–0	UEFA Assist U-15 Development Tournament
Last updated 14 December 2018

== Honours ==
Bangladesh U-15

- SAFF U-17 Championship: 2018

Individual

- 2018 – SAFF U-15 Championship Top Scorer Award.
- 2020–21 – BPL Emerging Player of the Season Award.
