= Dipok Roy =

Bangladeshi footballer

Personal information
- Full name: Dipok Roy
- Date of birth: 12 August 2002 (age 24)
- Place of birth: Nilphamari, Bangladesh
- Height: 1.67 m (5 ft 6 in)
- Positions: Right winger; left winger

Team information
- Current team: Bangladesh Police
- Number: 24

Youth career
- 2015–2016: Jurain FA
- 2018: Dhaka Abahani U18

Senior career*
Years	Team	Apps	(Gls)
2017	Jabid Ahsan Sohel	9	(1)
2018–2022	Dhaka Abahani	13	(1)
2022–2024	Sheikh Russel	55	(6)
2024–	Bangladesh Police	29	(3)

International career^{‡}
2017	Bangladesh U17	2	(1)
2019	Bangladesh U20	7	(1)
Medal record
Men's football
Representing Bangladesh
SAFF U-17 Championship
Bronze medal – third place	2017 Nepal	Team
SAFF U-20 Championship
Runner-up	2019 Nepal	Team
- * Club domestic league appearances and goals as of 24 October 2026 ‡ National team caps and goals as of 10 November 2019

Dipok Roy (Bengali: দীপক রায়; born 12 August 2002) is a Bangladeshi professional footballer who plays as a winger for Bangladesh Football League club Bangladesh Police.

== Early life ==
Dipok Roy was born on 12 August 2002, in Nilphamari District, the son of Montu Roy and Pramoda Roy. His father, worked as a taxi driver and was initially against Dipok pursuing football. In 2016, Dipok took part in the Pioneer Football League for Jurain Football Academy and finished the league as the top scorer. The following year, he was called up to the Bangladesh U16 national team before joining Jabid Ahsan Sohel Krira Chakra for the 2018 Dhaka Third Division League. On 22 January 2018, he scored on his debut to salvage a 1–1 against Arambagh Football Academy. In the same year, he participated in the BFF U-18 Football Tournament with eventual winners, Dhaka Abahani. Following the conclusion of the tournament, he was sent to Brazil for further training.

== Club career ==
=== Abahani Limited Dhaka ===
In 2018, Dipok joined Dhaka Abahani in the Bangladesh Premier League on a permanent deal, following his stint playing for its youth team. On 23 May 2019, he made his competitive debut for the club during a league fixture against Muktijoddha Sangsad KC. On 5 February 2021, he scored his first professional goal during a 4–1 victory over Muktijoddha Sangsad.

=== Sheikh Russel KC ===
In 2022, Dipok signed for Sheikh Russel KC and made his competitive debut for the club in the 2021 Independence Cup against Uttar Baridhara Club, on 27 November 2021. Dipok scored his first goal for Sheikh Russel as a stoppage time equaliser in a 1–1 draw against Dhaka Abahani, on 12 May 2022. On 27 July 2023, Dipok scored a brace in a 3–1 victory over Rahmatganj MFS. During his first season with the club, Dipok scored 3 goals from 24 games in all competitions.

On 2 March 2023, Dipok opened his account for the new season by scoring in a 3–3 draw with Dhaka Abahani in the 2022 Federation Cup. On 26 May 2023, Dipok scored from a long range strike as Sheikh Russel suffered a 4–6 defeat to Bashundhara Kings. He ended the season by scoring the winning goal in a 3–2 victory over Muktijoddha Sangsad.

== International career ==
=== Youth ===
In 2017, Dipok was included in the Bangladesh U15 team for the 2017 SAFF U-15 Championship, however, he spent most of the tournament as a substitute. Dipok secured his starting position in the team during the 2018 AFC U-16 Championship qualifiers. Despite Bangladesh not advancing to the main tournament, he scored the in a 2–0 victory over Qatar U16, helping his team finish as group runners-up.

In 2019, he was called up to the Bangladesh U19 team for the 2019 SAFF U-18 Championship. On 27 September 2019, he scored in a 4–0 victory over Bhutan U19 in the semi-finals. He made a substitute appearance in the final against India U19, which ended as a 1–2 defeat. In the same year, Dipok represented the team during both Qatar's U19 Three Nations Tournament and the 2020 AFC U-19 Championship qualifiers.

=== Senior ===
In 2023, Dipok was called up to the Bangladesh national team by coach Javier Cabrera for friendly matches against Afghanistan and the 2026 FIFA World Cup qualification – AFC first round. Nonetheless, he failed to make his international debut and was eventually left out of the final squad for the World Cup qualifiers. On November 18, 2023, Dipok was included in the national squad as a replacement for the suspended winger, Rakib Hossain, in the 2026 FIFA World Cup qualification – AFC second round.

== Career statistics ==
=== Club ===
As of 23 July 2023.

Appearances and goals by club, season and competition
Club	Season	League			Domestic Cup (Note: Appearance(s) in Bangladesh Federation Cup)		Other (Note: Appearance(s) in Bangladesh Independence Cup)		Continental		Total	
Club	Season	Division	Apps	Goals	Apps	Goals	Apps	Goals	Apps	Goals	Apps	Goals
Jabid Ahsan Sohel KC	2017–18	Dhaka Third Division League	9	1	0	0	0	0	0	0	9	1
Dhaka Abahani	2018–19	Bangladesh Football League	1	0	0	0	0	0	0	0	1	0
Dhaka Abahani	2019–20	Bangladesh Football League	0	0	0	0	0	0	0	0	0	0
Dhaka Abahani	2020–21	Bangladesh Football League	12	1	0	0	—		0	0	12	1
Dhaka Abahani	Dhaka Abahani total		13	1	0	0	0	0	0	0	13	1
Sheikh Russel KC	2021–22	Bangladesh Football League	21	3	0	0	3	0	—		24	3
Sheikh Russel KC	2022–23	Bangladesh Football League	17	3	5	1	2	0	—		24	4
Sheikh Russel KC	2023–24	Bangladesh Football League	0	0	0	0	0	0	—		0	0
Career total			60	8	5	1	5	0	0	0	70	9

=== International goals ===
==== Youth ====
Scores and results list Bangladesh's goal tally first.

No.	Date	Venue	Opponent	Score	Result	Competition
1.	24 September 2017	Grand Hamad Stadium, Doha, Qatar	Qatar	1–0	2–0	2018 AFC U-16 Championship qualifiers
2.	27 September 2019	APF Stadium, Kathmandu, Nepal	Bhutan	4–0	4–0	2019 SAFF U-18 Championship
Last updated 27 September 2019

== Honours ==
Individual

- Pioneer League Top Scorer Award: 2016
