= Roger Duarte =

Brazilian footballer (born 1995)

Roger
Personal information
- Full name: Roger Duarte de Oliveira
- Date of birth: 11 January 1995 (age 31)
- Place of birth: Belo Horizonte, Brazil
- Height: 1.84 m (6 ft 0 in)
- Position: Centre-back

Youth career
- 2006–2007: Atlético Mineiro
- 2008–2011: São Paulo
- 2012–2015: América Mineiro

Senior career*
Years	Team	Apps	(Gls)
2016–2020	América Mineiro	17	(0)
2018	→ CSA (loan)	13	(0)
2019	→ Botafogo SP (loan)	0	(0)
2021	Grêmio Anápolis	12	(0)
2022	Manauara	2	(0)
2022	Operário	1	(0)
2022–2023	Mohammedan SC	14	(0)
- * Club domestic league appearances and goals as of 22 July 2023

Roger Duarte de Oliveira (born 11 January 1995), known as Roger Duarte or simply Roger, is a Brazilian professional footballer who plays as a centre-back.

== Career ==
Born in Belo Horizonte, Minas Gerais, Roger represented Atlético Mineiro, São Paulo and América Mineiro as a youth. In 2016, he was promoted to the main squad by manager Givanildo Oliveira.

Roger made his first team debut on 20 April 2016, starting in a 1–1 Copa do Brasil away draw against Red Bull Brasil. He made his Série A debut on 28 May, coming on as a second-half substitute for Hélder Maurílio in a 1–1 draw at Cruzeiro.

On 4 February 2019, Roger was loaned out to Botafogo-SP.

== Personal life ==
Roger is physically likened to Brazil international defender David Luiz, mainly due to his hair and footballing position.

== Honours ==
Mohammedan SC

- Federation Cup : 2022–23

América Mineiro

- Campeonato Mineiro: 2016
