= 2022–23 Federation Cup (Bangladesh) =

34th season of the Bangladesh Federation Cup

Bashundhara Group Federation Cup 2022–23

Tournament details
- Host country: Bangladesh
- City: 3
- Dates: 20 December 2022 – 30 May 2023
- Teams: 11
- Venues: 3 (in 3 host cities)

Final positions
- Champions: Mohammedan Sporting Club (11th title)
- Runners-up: Abahani Limited
- Third place: Bashundhara Kings
- Fourth place: Sheikh Russel KC

Tournament statistics
- Matches played: 23
- Goals scored: 72 (3.13 per match)
- Top scorer(s): Souleymane Diabate (8 goals each)
- Best player: Souleymane Diabate
- Fair play award: Bashundhara Kings

The 2022–23 Federation Cup (due to sponsorship from Bashundhara Group also known as Bashundhara Group Federation Cup 2022–23) was the 34th edition of the tournament, the main domestic annual top-tier clubs football competition in Bangladesh organized by Bangladesh Football Federation (BFF). The eleven participants were contest in the tournament. The tournament were played from 20 December 2022 – 30 May 2023. The winner of the tournament will earn the slot of playing Qualifying play-off of 2023–24 AFC Cup.

Mohammedan SC are current champions having defeated Abahani Limited Dhaka by 4(4)–(2)4 to lift the trophy for the eleventh time.

== Participating teams ==
The following eleven teams will contest in the tournament.

Team	Appearances	Previous best performance
AFC Uttara	Debut	
Bangladesh Police FC	4th	Runners-up (1975)
Bashundhara Kings	5th	Champions (2019–20, 2020–21)
Chittagong Abahani	12th	Runners-up (2017)
Abahani Limited Dhaka	34th	Champions (1982, 1985, 1986, 1988, 1997, 1999, 2000, 2010, 2016, 2017, 2018, 2021–22)
Mohammedan SC	34th	Champions (1980, 1981, 1982, 1983, 1987, 1989, 1995, 2002, 2008, 2009)
Fortis FC	Debut	
Muktijoddha Sangsad KC	34th	Champions (1994, 2001, 2003)
Rahmatganj MFS	34th	Runners-up (2019–20, 2021–22)
Sheikh Russel KC	28	Champions (2012)
Sheikh Jamal DC	12th	Champions (2011-12, 2013, 2015)

== Venues ==
The matches were played at these three venues across the country.

Comilla	Gopalganj	Munshigonj
Shaheed Dhirendranath Datta Stadium	Sheikh Fazlul Haque Mani Stadium	Shaheed Bir Sreshtho Flight Lt. Matiur Rahman Stadium
Capacity: 18,000	Capacity: 5,000	Capacity: 10,000
2022–23 Federation Cup (Bangladesh) is located in Bangladesh

== Draw ==
The draw ceremony were held on 16:00 25 November 2022 at 3rd floor of BFF house Motijheel, Dhaka. There are eleven team was divided into three groups. The top two teams from each group and two best third-placed teams will qualify for the Knock out stages.

== Group summary ==
Group A	Group B	Group C
Sheikh Jamal DC	Bashundhara Kings	Abahani Limited Dhaka
Mohammedan SC	Chittagong Abahani	Sheikh Russel KC
Rahmatganj MFS	Muktijoddha Sangsad KC	Bangladesh Police FC
AFC Uttara	Fortis FC	

== Round Matches Dates ==
Phase	Date
Group stages	20 December 2022 – 3 February 2023
Quarter-finals	4 April–2 May 2023
Semi-finals	9–16 May 2023
Third-place	23 May 2023
Final	30 May 2023

== Match officials ==
Referees

- (Bangladesh) Sabuj Das
- (Bangladesh) Md Anisur Rahman Sagor
- (Bangladesh) Md Nasir Uddin
- (Bangladesh) Bhubon Mohon Tarafder
- (Bangladesh) Md Jalal Uddin
- (Bangladesh) Md Alamgir Sarkar
- (Bangladesh) Rimon Mahmud

Assistant Referees

- (Bangladesh) Md Rasel Mahmud Jibon
- (Bangladesh) Bayezid Mondol
- (Bangladesh) Mehedi Hasan Emon
- (Bangladesh) Sheikh Iqbal Alam
- (Bangladesh) Md Shah Alam
- (Bangladesh) Sujoy Barua
- (Bangladesh) Soumik Pal
- (Bangladesh) Md Rimon Mahmud
- (Bangladesh) Md Nuruzzaman
- (Bangladesh) Anwar Hossain Saju
- (Bangladesh) Sabbir Salek Shuvo
- (Bangladesh) Md Monir Ahmmad Dhali
- (Bangladesh) Biash Sarkar

== Group stages ==
Key to colours in group tables
Group winners, runners-ups and two best third-placed teams will advance to the Knockout-stage.

Tiebreakers

Teams were ranked according to points (3 points for a win, 1 point for a draw, 0 points for a loss), and if tied on points, the following tie-breaking criteria were applied, in the order given, to determine the rankings.

1. Points in head-to-head matches among tied teams;
2. Goal difference in head-to-head matches among tied teams;
3. Goals scored in head-to-head matches among tied teams;
4. If more than two teams are tied, and after applying all head-to-head criteria above, a subset of teams are still tied, all head-to-head criteria above are reapplied exclusively to this subset of teams;
5. Goal difference in all group matches;
6. Goals scored in all group matches;
7. Penalty shoot-out if only two teams were tied and they met in the last round of the group;
8. Disciplinary points (yellow card = 1 point, red card as a result of two yellow cards = 3 points, direct red card = 3 points, yellow card followed by direct red card = 4 points);
9. Drawing of lots.

=== Group A ===
Pos	Team	Pld	W	D	L	GF	GA	GD	Pts	Qualification
1	Mohammedan SC	3	2	1	0	10	2	+8	7	Advance to knockout phase
2	Rahmatganj MFS	3	2	0	1	5	2	+3	6	Advance to knockout phase
3	Sheikh Jamal DC	3	1	1	1	5	5	0	4	Advance to knockout phase
4	AFC Uttara	3	0	0	3	1	12	−11	0	

Source: Footystats
Rules for classification: Group stage tiebreakers
20 December 2022
14:30

AFC Uttara	0–3	Sheikh Jamal DC
	Report	Otabek Valizhonov 1' (pen.); Kawshik Barua 75'; Mannaf Rabby 78'

Shaheed Bir Sreshtho Flight Lt. Matiur Rahman Stadium, Munshigonj
Referee: Sabuj Das
20 December 2022
14:30

Mohammedan SC	1–0	Rahmatganj MFS
Diabate 75'	Report

Sheikh Fazlul Haque Mani Stadium, Gopalganj
Referee: Md Anisur Rahman Sagor

10 January 2023
14:45

Rahmatganj MFS	3–0	Sheikh Jamal DC
Fatkhullo 16'; Michael 45+2'; Jhoaho Hinestroza 76'	Report

Shaheed Bir Sreshtho Flight Lt. Matiur Rahman Stadium, Munshigonj
Referee: Md Alamgir Sarkar
10 January 2023
14:45

Mohammedan SC	7–0	AFC Uttara
Muzaffar Muzaffarov 5', 52'; Roger 7'; Febles 39'; Sazzad 49', 60'; Shahriar Emon 52'	Report

Shaheed Dhirendranath Datta Stadium, Cumilla
Referee: Rimon Mahmud

31 January 2023
15:00

AFC Uttara	1–2	Rahmatganj MFS
Rohit Sarker 6'	Report	Jhoaho Hinestroza 71' (pen.); Khondoker Ashraful Islam 74'

Shaheed Dhirendranath Datta Stadium, Cumilla
Referee: Rimon Mahmud
31 January 2023
15:00

Mohammedan SC	2–2	Sheikh Jamal DC
Arif Hossain 28'; Ashraful Haque Asif 71'	Report	Stewart 54'; Sulayman Sillah 76'

Sheikh Fazlul Haque Mani Stadium, Gopalganj
Referee: Md Jalal Uddin

=== Group B ===
Pos	Team	Pld	W	D	L	GF	GA	GD	Pts	Qualification
1	Bashundhara Kings	3	3	0	0	8	3	+5	9	Advance to knockout phase
2	Chittagong Abahani	3	1	1	1	1	2	−1	4	Advance to knockout phase
3	Muktijoddha Sangsad KC	3	1	0	2	5	6	−1	3	Advance to knockout phase
4	Fortis FC	3	0	1	2	1	4	−3	1	

Source: Footystats
Rules for classification: Group stage tiebreakers
27 December 2022
14:30

Bashundhara Kings	2–0	Fortis FC
Asror Gafurov 53', 94'	Report

Shaheed Bir Sreshtho Flight Lt. Matiur Rahman Stadium, Munshigonj
Referee: Md Nasir Uddin
27 December 2022
14:30

Chittagong Abahani	1–0	Muktijoddha Sangsad KC
Ojukwu David Ifegwu 90'	Report

Sheikh Fazlul Haque Mani Stadium, Gopalganj
Referee: Bhubon Mohon Tarafder

17 January 2023
15:00

Fortis FC	0–0	Chittagong Abahani
	Report

Shaheed Bir Sreshtho Flight Lt. Matiur Rahman Stadium, Munshigonj
Referee: Md Jalal Uddin
17 January 2023
15:00

Bashundhara Kings	4–3	Muktijoddha Sangsad KC
Robinho 15'; Asror Gafurov 36'; Sumon 49'; Dorielton 82'	Report	Emmanuel 38', 90' (pen.); Ndikumana 87'

Sheikh Fazlul Haque Mani Stadium, Gopalganj
Referee: Md Alamgir Sarkar

7 February 2023
15:15

Bashundhara Kings	2–0	Chittagong Abahani
Topu 40'; Miguel 55' (pen.)	Report

Shaheed Dhirendranath Datta Stadium, Cumilla
Referee: Bhubon Mohon Tarofder
7 February 2023
15:15

Fortis FC	1–2	Muktijoddha Sangsad KC
Sabuz 85'	Report	Emmanuel 44'; Ndikumana 90+1'

Shaheed Bir Sreshtho Flight Lt. Matiur Rahman Stadium, Munshigonj
Referee: Md Nasir Uddin

=== Group C ===
Pos	Team	Pld	W	D	L	GF	GA	GD	Pts	Qualification
1	Abahani Limited Dhaka	2	2	0	0	4	3	+1	6	Advance to knockout phase
2	Sheikh Russel KC	2	1	0	1	4	3	+1	3	Advance to knockout phase
3	Bangladesh Police FC	2	0	0	2	0	2	−2	0	

Source: Footystats
Rules for classification: Group stage tiebreakers
3 January 2023
14:45

Bangladesh Police FC	0–1	Abahani Limited Dhaka
	Report	Monjurur 41' (o.g.)

Shaheed Bir Sreshtho Flight Lt. Matiur Rahman Stadium, Munshigonj
Referee: Bhubon Mohon Tarafder

24 January 2023
15:00

Bangladesh Police FC	0–1	Sheikh Russel KC
	Report	Ucchash 76'

Shaheed Bir Sreshtho Flight Lt. Matiur Rahman Stadium, Munshigonj
Referee: Md Jalal Uddin

28 February 2023
15:45

Abahani Limited Dhaka	3–3 (a.e.t.)	Sheikh Russel KC
Mehedi 16'; Eleta 48'; Peter 89'	Report	Dipok 67'; Didier 79' (pen.); Khalekuzzaman Sabuj 84'
Penalties
Peter (penalty scored); Yousef (penalty missed); Rahmat (penalty scored); Maraz (penalty scored); Colindres (penalty scored); Reza (penalty scored)	5–4	Didier (penalty scored); Udoh (penalty scored); Timur Talipov (penalty scored); Hemanta (penalty missed); Ibrahim (penalty scored); Yeasin (penalty missed)

Sheikh Fazlul Haque Mani Stadium, Gopalganj
Referee: Md Nasir Uddin

=== Ranking of third-placed teams ===
Due to groups having different numbers of teams, the results against the fourth-placed teams in four-team groups are not considered for this ranking.

Pos	Grp	Team	Pld	W	D	L	GF	GA	GD	Pts	
1	A	Sheikh Jamal DC	2	0	1	1	2	5	−3	1	knockout phase
2	B	Muktijoddha Sangsad KC	2	0	0	2	3	5	−2	0 (Note: Goals scored: Muktijoddha SKC: 3, Police FC: 0.)	knockout phase
3	C	Bangladesh Police FC	2	0	0	2	0	2	−2	0	

Source: Soccerway

== Knockout stage ==
- In the knockout stages, if a match finished goalless at the end of normal playing time, extra time would have been played (two periods of 15 minutes each) and followed, if necessary, by a penalty shoot-out to determine the winner.

=== Bracket ===
Quarter-finals
4 April–Munshigonj
Bashundhara Kings	3
Muktijoddha Sangsad KC	1
18 April–Cumilla
Chittagong Abahani	1
Mohammedan SC	4
11 April–Gopalganj
Abahani Limited Dhaka	1
Sheikh Jamal DC	0
2 May–Munshigonj
Sheikh Russel KC	1
Rahmatganj MFS	0

Semi-finals
9 May–Gopalganj
Bashundhara Kings	1
Mohammedan SC	2
16 May–Cumilla
Abahani Limited Dhaka	3
Sheikh Russel KC	0

Final
30 May–Cumilla
Mohammedan SC (p)	4 (4)
Abahani Limited Dhaka	4 (2)
Third place
23 May–Gopalganj
Bashundhara Kings	2
Sheikh Russel KC	1

=== Quarter-finals ===
4 April 2023
15:15

Bashundhara Kings	3–1	Muktijoddha Sangsad KC
Dorielton 42', 79'; Robinho 81'	Report	Emmanuel 34'

Shaheed Bir Sreshtho Flight Lt. Matiur Rahman Stadium, Munshigonj
Referee: Md Anisur Rahman Sagor

11 April 2023
15:15

Abahani Limited Dhaka	1–0	Sheikh Jamal DC
Augusto 81'	Report

Sheikh Fazlul Haque Mani Stadium, Gopalganj
Referee: Md Nasir Uddin

18 April 2023
15:15

Mohammedan SC	4–1	Chittagong Abahani
Emmanuel 20'; Muzzafar Muzaffarov 35'; Diabate 48', 70'	Report	Augustine 77' (pen.)

Shaheed Dhirendranath Datta Stadium, Cumilla
Attendance: 150
Referee: Md Alamgir Sarkar

2 May 2023
15:15

Sheikh Russel KC	1–0	Rahmatganj MFS
Ikechukwu 13'	Report

Shaheed Bir Sreshtho Flight Lt. Matiur Rahman Stadium, Munshigonj
Referee: Md Anisur Rahman Sagor

=== Semi-finals ===
9 May 2023
15:15

Bashundhara Kings	1–2	Mohammedan SC
Dorielton 43'	Report	Emmanuel 3'; Diabate 55'

Sheikh Fazlul Haque Mani Stadium, Gopalganj
Attendance: 2,000
Referee: Bhubon Mohon Tarafder

16 May 2023
15:15

Abahani Limited Dhaka	3–0	Sheikh Russel KC
Colindres 37'; Fahim 51', 70'	Report

Shaheed Dhirendranath Datta Stadium, Cumilla
Referee: Md Mizanur Rahman

=== Third-place ===
23 May 2023
15:15

Bashundhara Kings	2–1	Sheikh Russel KC
Khalekuzzaman Sabuj 85' (o.g.); Figueira 90+1'	Report	Brossou 7'

Bashundhara Kings Arena, Dhaka
Attendance: 3,500
Referee: Md Nasir Uddin

=== Final ===
30 May 2023
15:15

Mohammedan SC	4–4 (a.e.t.)	Abahani Limited Dhaka
Diabate 57', 61', 84', 105+4'	Report	Fahim 17'; Colindres 43'; Emeka 66'; Rahmat 118'
Penalties
Diabate (penalty scored); Alamgir (penalty scored); Roger (penalty scored); Emon (penalty missed); Kamrul (penalty scored)	4–2	Augusto (penalty missed); Emeka (penalty scored); Yousef (penalty scored); Colindres (penalty missed)

Shaheed Dhirendranath Datta Stadium, Cumilla
Attendance: 12,600
Referee: Md Alamgir Sarker

34th Federation Cup 2022–23
Winners
Mohammedan SC
Eleventh Title

== Statistics ==
=== Goalscorers ===
There have been 72 goals scored in 23 matches, for an average of 3.13 goals per match. Source: Footystats

8 Goals

- (Mali) Souleymane Diabate (Mohammedan SC)

4 Goals

- (Nigeria) Emmanuel Uzochukwu (Muktijoddha Sangsad KC)
- (Brazil) Dorielton Gomes Nascimento (Bashundhara Kings)

3 Goals

- (Uzbekistan) Asror Gafurov (Bashundhara Kings)
- (Uzbekistan) Muzaffar Muzaffarov (Mohammedan SC)
- (Bangladesh) Foysal Ahmed Fahim (Abahani Limited Dhaka)

2 Goals

- (Brazil) Robson Azevedo da Silva (Bashundhara Kings)
- (Colombia) Jhoaho Hinestroza (Rahmatganj MFS)
- (Bangladesh) Sazzad Hossain (Mohammedan SC)
- (Burundi) Landry Ndikumana (Muktijoddha Sangsad KC)
- (Nigeria) Sunday Emmanuel (Mohammedan SC)
- (Ivory Coast) Kpehi Didier Brossou (Sheikh Russel KC)
- (Brazil) Miguel Figueira (Bashundhara Kings)
- (Costa Rica) Daniel Colindres (Abahani Limited Dhaka)

1 Goal

- (Bangladesh) Arif Hossain (Mohammedan SC)
- (Bangladesh) Ashraful Haque Asif (Mohammedan SC)
- (Bangladesh) Nihat Jaman Ucchash (Sheikh Russel KC)
- (Bangladesh) Shahriar Emon (Mohammedan SC)
- (Bangladesh) Sumon Reza (Bashundhara Kings)
- (Brazil) Roger Duarte (Mohammedan SC)
- (Brazil) Michael Vinícius Silva de Morais (Rahmatganj MFS)
- (Bangladesh) Sabuz Hossain (Fortis FC)
- (Bangladesh) Topu Barman (Bashundhara Kings)
- (Bangladesh) Khondoker Ashraful Islam (Rahmatganj MFS)
- (Bangladesh) Rohit Sarker (AFC Uttara)
- (Bangladesh) Mehedi Hasan Royal (Abahani Limited Dhaka)
- (Bangladesh) Dipok Roy (Sheikh Russel KC)
- (Bangladesh) Khalekuzzaman Sabuj (Sheikh Russel KC)
- (Bangladesh) Eleta Kingsley (Abahani Limited Dhaka)
- (Bangladesh) Kawshik Barua (Sheikh Jamal DC)
- (Bangladesh) Mannaf Rabbi (Sheikh Jamal DC)
- (Venezuela) Daniel Febles (Mohammedan SC)
- (Tajikistan) Fatkhullo Fatkhulloyev (Rahmatganj MFS)
- (Uzbekistan) Otabek Valizhonov (Sheikh Jamal DC)
- (Nigeria) Ojukwu David Ifegwu (Chittagong Abahani)
- (Nigeria) Candy Augustine Agbane (Chittagong Abahani)
- (Saint Vincent and the Grenadines) Cornelius Stewart (Sheikh Jamal DC)
- (The Gambia) Sulayman Sillah (Sheikh Jamal DC)
- (Nigeria) Peter Nworah (Abahani Limited Dhaka)
- (Brazil) Raphael Augusto (Abahani Limited Dhaka)
- (Nigeria) Kenneth Ikechukwu (Sheikh Russel KC)
- (Nigeria) Emeka Ogbugh (Abahani Limited Dhaka)
- (Bangladesh) Rahmat Mia (Abahani Limited Dhaka)

=== Own goals ===
† Bold Club indicates winner of the match

Player	Club	Opponent	Result	Date
(Bangladesh) Monjurur Rahman Manik	Bangladesh Police FC	Abahani Limited Dhaka	0–1	3 January 2023
(Bangladesh) Khalekuzzaman Sabuj	Sheikh Russel KC	Bashundhara Kings	1–2	23 May 2023

=== Hat-tricks ===
Player	For	Against	Result	Date	Ref
(Mali) Souleymane Diabate ^{4}	Dhaka Mohammedan	Dhaka Abahani	(4) 4–4 (2)	30 May 2023	

== Awards ==
Most Valuable Player	Top Goalscorer	Best Player
Souleymane Diabate	Souleymane Diabate	Souleymane Diabate

== See also ==
- 2022–23 Independence Cup (Bangladesh)
- 2022–23 Bangladesh Premier League (football)
