= Kenneth Ngwoke =

Nigerian footballer (born 1993)

Personal information
- Full name: Kenneth Ikechukwu Ngwoke
- Date of birth: 29 March 1993 (age 33)
- Place of birth: Nsukka, Nigeria
- Height: 1.83 m (6 ft 0 in)
- Position: Forward

Team information
- Current team: Sumsel United
- Number: 32

Senior career*
Years	Team	Apps	(Gls)
2012–2013	Hamitköy	26	(13)
2013–2015	Yenicami Ağdelen	32	(32)
2014	→ Çetinkaya (loan)	10	(9)
2015–2016	Ismaily	24	(2)
2016–2017	El Sharkia	29	(6)
2017–2018	Paykan	16	(2)
2018–2019	Yenicami Ağdelen	36	(25)
2019–2020	Al-Minaa	4	(0)
2020–2020	Göcmenköy IYSK	18	(9)
2020–2021	Saif SC	21	(11)
2021–2022	Churchill Brothers	18	(10)
2022–2023	Al-Nahda	0	(0)
2023	Sheikh Russel KC	9	(5)
2023–2024	Semen Padang	28	(17)
2025–2026	Al-Hurriya	0	(0)
2026–	Sumsel United	7	(2)
- * Club domestic league appearances and goals as of 30 October 2026

Kenneth Ikechukwu Ngwoke (born 29 March 1993) is a Nigerian professional footballer who plays as a forward for Championship club Sumsel United.

== Club career ==
=== Saif SC ===
On 11 November 2020, Ngwoke signed with Saif SC for the 2020–21 season in Bangladesh Premier League. On 23 December 2020, Ngwoke scores his 1st goal with Saif SC in 2020–21 Bangladesh Federation Cup.

=== Churchill Brothers ===
On 12 October 2021, Ngwoke signed with I-League club Churchill Brothers on a one-year deal.

On 4 March 2022, he scored his first goals for the club against RoundGlass Punjab, in a 2–2 draw.

=== Al-Nahda ===
On 27 July 2022, Ngwoke joined Saudi Arabian side Al-Nahda.

== Honours ==
Semen Padang

- Liga 2 runner-up: 2023–24
