= 2023–24 Sheikh Russel KC season =

Sheikh Russel KC
2023–24 season
- President: Sayem Sobhan Anvir
- Head coach: Jugoslav Trenchovski
- Stadium: Bashundhara Kings Arena
- Bangladesh Premier League: 6th
- Federation Cup: Quarter-finals
- Independence Cup: Group stage
- Top goalscorer: League: Landry Ndikumana (6 goals); All: Landry Ndikumana (7 goals)
- Biggest win: 4–1 v Brothers Union (Home) 17 February 2024 (Premier League)
- Biggest defeat: 1–3 v Dhaka Abahani (Away) 20 January 2024 (Premier League); 1–3 v Fortis FC (Neutral) 23 January 2024 (Federation Cup); 1–3 v Bashundhara Kings (Home) 29 May 2024 (Premier League)
Home colours	Away colours

The 2023–24 season is Sheikh Russel KC's 29th overall since its establishment in 1995 and their 17th season in the Bangladesh Premier League. In addition to the domestic league, Sheikh Russel will participate in this season's edition of the Federation Cup and Independence Cup. The season covers a period from 1 August 2023 to 31 May 2024.

== Players ==
As of 24 March 2024

No.	Player	Nat.	Position(s)	Date of birth	Year signed	Previous club
Goalkeepers
1	Mitul Marma	(Bangladesh)	GK	11 December 2003 (aged 19)	2023	Fortis FC
22	Rakibul Islam Tushar	(Bangladesh)	GK	8 February 1997 (aged 26)	2023	Bangladesh Police FC
29	Mehedi Islam Rabbani	(Bangladesh)	GK	12 February 2005 (aged 18)	2023	GWC Munshigonj
30	Nayeem Mia	(Bangladesh)	GK	12 January 1994 (aged 29)	2023	Chittagong Abahani Limited
Defenders
2	Shahin Ahammad	(Bangladesh)	RB	15 October 2003 (aged 20)	2023	Fortis FC
3	Abid Ahmed	(Bangladesh)	LB	10 January 2001 (aged 22)	2022	Saif SC
4	Shawkat Russel	(Bangladesh)	CB	4 February 1991 (aged 32)	2022	Chittagong Abahani Limited
5	Ganiu Ogungbe	(Nigeria)	CB	1 December 1992 (aged 30)	2022	(Malta) Pietà Hotspurs
13	Ariful Islam Jitu	(Bangladesh)	CB	15 November 1993 (aged 29)	2023	Fortis FC
14	Tanvir Hossain	(Bangladesh)	CB	13 December 2003 (aged 19)	2023	Rahmatganj MFS
15	Jintu Mia	(Bangladesh)	LB	1 February 1998 (aged 25)	2023	AFC Uttara
23	Monir Alam	(Bangladesh)	CB	24 March 2000 (aged 23)	2022	Chittagong Abahani Limited
27	Apon Sarkar	(Bangladesh)	CB	29 March 2007 (aged 16)	2023	
31	Mohammad Sagor Miah	(Bangladesh)	CB	4 February 2005 (aged 18)	2023	AFC Uttara
44	Valeriy Stepanenko	(Ukraine)	CB	19 October 1998 (aged 25)	2024	(North Macedonia) FK Bregalnica Štip
Midfielders
6	Emon Mahmud Babu	(Bangladesh)	CM/AM	3 June 1991 (aged 32)	2023	Abahani Limited Dhaka
7	Shahidul Islam Sumon	(Bangladesh)	CM/AM	7 June 2004 (aged 19)	2023	Fortis FC
8	Kodai Iida	(Japan)	CM	6 December 1994 (aged 28)	2023	(Australia) Preston Lions FC
67	Akhror Umarjonov	(Uzbekistan)	CM	26 September 1993 (aged 30)	2024	(Maldives) New Radiant SC
95	Vojislav Balabanovic	(Serbia)	CM	15 December 1995 (aged 27)	2024	(Maldives) Maziya S&RC
Forwards
16	Mohamed Munna	(Bangladesh)	CF	10 August 1999 (aged 24)	2023	Rahmatganj MFS
17	Nihat Jaman Ucchash	(Bangladesh)	CF/RW/LW	24 September 2003 (aged 20)	2022	Saif SC
18	Ekbal Hussain	(Bangladesh)	RW/LW/CF	14 August 1995 (aged 28)	2023	Chittagong Abahani Limited
19	Sarower Zaman Nipu	(Bangladesh)	RW/LW/CF	5 June 2000 (aged 23)	2023	AFC Uttara
20	Sumon Reza	(Bangladesh)	ST	15 June 1995 (aged 28)	2023	Bashundhara Kings
24	Dipok Roy	(Bangladesh)	RW/LW	12 August 2002 (aged 21)	2021	Abahani Limited Dhaka
45	Sekou Sylla	(Guinea)	ST	1 January 1992 (aged 31)	2024	(Indonesia) Persikab Bandung
Players on loan
26	Chandon Roy	(Bangladesh)	CM/AM	4 May 2007 (aged 16)	2023	BFF Elite Academy
Left during the season
9	Frantzety Herard	(Haiti)	CF	10 March 2002 (aged 21)	2023	(Dominican Republic) Atlético Pantoja
10	Landry Ndikumana	(Burundi)	CF	5 October 1992 (aged 31)	2023	Muktijoddha Sangsad
11	Abdurakhmon Abdulkhakov	(Uzbekistan)	LW	12 August 2002 (aged 21)	2023	(Kyrgyzstan) FC Aldiyer Kurshab
12	Sujon Biswas	(Bangladesh)	AM/LM	11 January 1995 (aged 28)	2022	Uttar Baridhara
21	Almazbek Malikov	(Kyrgyzstan)	CB	19 May 1996 (aged 27)	2023	(Kyrgyzstan) Muras United
25	Mahadud Hossain Fahim	(Bangladesh)	CM	12 December 2003 (aged 19)	2022	Muktijoddha Sangsad
28	Abu Bokor	(Bangladesh)	CM	31 December 1996 (aged 26)	2023	Muktijoddha Sangsad

== Pre-season friendly ==
=== Pre-season ===
20 October 2023	Sheikh Jamal DC	1–0	Sheikh Russel KC	Dhaka
15:00 UTC+6	Leite 65'	Report		Stadium: Bashundhara Kings practice ground

=== Mid-season ===
23 November 2023	Dhaka Abahani	4–0	Sheikh Russel KC	Dhaka
15:00 UTC+6	Rahim; Enamul; Washington	Report		Stadium: Abahani Limited field

== Transfer ==
=== In ===
No.	Pos	Player	Previous club	Fee	Date	Source
1	GK	Mitul Marma	Fortis FC	Free	1 August 2023	
2	DF	Shahin Mia	Fortis FC	Free	1 August 2023	
22	GK	Rakibul Islam Tushar	Rahmatganj MFS	Free	1 August 2023	
18	FW	Ekbal Hussain	Chittagong Abahani Limited	Free	1 August 2023	
30	GK	Nayeem Mia	Chittagong Abahani Limited	Free	1 August 2023	
13	DF	Ariful Islam Jitu	Fortis FC	Free	1 August 2023	
7	MF	Shahidul Islam Sumon	Fortis FC	Free	1 August 2023	
20	FW	Sumon Reza	Bashundhara Kings	Free	1 August 2023	
31	DF	Mohammad Sagor Miah	AFC Uttara	Free	1 August 2023	
16	FW	Mohamed Munna	Rahmatganj MFS	Free	1 August 2023	
14	DF	Tanvir Hossain	Rahmatganj MFS	Free	1 August 2023	
15	DF	Jintu Mia	AFC Uttara	Free	1 August 2023	
19	FW	Sarower Zaman Nipu	AFC Uttara	Free	1 August 2023	
27	DF	Apon Sarkar		Free	1 August 2023	
25	MF	Mahadud Hossain Fahim	Muktijoddha Sangsad	Free	1 August 2023	
28	MF	Abu Bokor	Muktijoddha Sangsad	Free	1 August 2023	
8	MF	(Japan) Kodai Iida	(Australia) Preston Lions FC	Free	11 August 2023	
10	FW	(Burundi) Landry Ndikumana	Muktijoddha Sangsad	Free	11 August 2023	
11	FW	(Uzbekistan) Abdurakhmon Abdulkhakov	(Kyrgyzstan) FC Aldiyer Kurshab	Free	12 August 2023	
9	FW	(Haiti) Frantzety Herard	(Dominican Republic) Atlético Pantoja	Free	30 August 2023	
21	DF	(Kyrgyzstan) Almazbek Malikov	(Kyrgyzstan) Muras United	Free	1 October 2023	
5	DF	(Nigeria) Ganiu Ogungbe	(Malta) Pietà Hotspurs	Free	18 October 2023	
6	MF	Emon Mahmud Babu	Abahani Limited Dhaka	Free	18 October 2023	
44	DF	(Ukraine) Valeriy Stepanenko	(North Macedonia) FK Bregalnica Štip	Free	1 March 2024	
67	MF	(Uzbekistan) Akhror Umarjonov	(Maldives) New Radiant SC	Free	1 March 2024	
95	MF	(Serbia) Vojislav Balabanovic	(Maldives) Maziya S&RC	Free	1 March 2024	
45	FW	(Guinea) Sekou Sylla	(Indonesia) Persikab Bandung	Free	1 March 2024	

=== Loans in ===
No.	Pos	Player	From	Fee	Date	On loan until	Source
26	MF	Chandon Roy	BFF Elite Academy	Tk 9 lakh	26 August 2023	23 July 2024	

=== Out ===
No.	Pos	Player	Moved to	Fee	Date	Source
19	FW	Mohammad Ibrahim	Bashundhara Kings	Free	1 August 2023	
18	DF	Salim Reza	Fortis FC	Free	1 August 2023	
12	MF	Md Jewel	Mohammedan SC	Free	1 August 2023	
14	MF	Maruf Ahamed	Free Agent	Released	1 August 2023	
91	DF	(Uzbekistan) Timur Talipov	(Uzbekistan) FC Neftchi Fergana	Free	5 August 2023	
8	MF	(Ivory Coast) Kpehi Didier Brossou	Bashundhara Kings	Free	14 August 2023	
6	MF	Jamal Bhuyan	(Argentina) Club Sol de Mayo	Free	16 August 2023	
32	FW	(Nigeria) Kenneth Ikechukwu	(Indonesia) Semen Padang	Free	30 August 2023	
7	DF	Khalekurzaman Sabuj	Brothers Union	Free	1 October 2023	
30	GK	Sabuj Das Raghu	Brothers Union	Free	1 October 2023	
2	DF	Monir Hossain	Brothers Union	Free	1 October 2023	
9	MF	Hemanta Vincent Biswas	Chittagong Abahani Limited	Free	1 October 2023	
4	DF	Yeasin Khan	Chittagong Abahani Limited	Free	1 October 2023	
16	MF	Mohamed Sohel Rana	Chittagong Abahani Limited	Free	1 October 2023	
1	GK	Ashraful Islam Rana	Chittagong Abahani Limited	Free	1 October 2023	
28	GK	Ibrahim Hossain	Free Agent	Released	1 October 2023	
22	GK	Md Sarower Jahan	Fortis FC	Released	1 October 2023	
21	MF	Mohiudeen Mahi	Uttara FC	Released	1 October 2023	
26	DF	Rabiul Alam	NoFeL SC	Released	1 October 2023	
12	MF	Sujon Biswas	Free Agent	Released	25 February 2024	
25	MF	Mahadud Hossain Fahim	Free Agent	Released	25 February 2024	
28	MF	Abu Bokor	Free Agent	Released	25 February 2024	
21	DF	(Kyrgyzstan) Almazbek Malikov	Free Agent	Released	25 February 2024	
10	FW	(Burundi) Landry Ndikumana	Free Agent	Released	25 February 2024	
11	FW	(Uzbekistan) Abdurakhmon Abdulkhakov	Free Agent	Released	25 February 2024	
9	FW	(Haiti) Frantzety Herard	Free Agent	Released	25 February 2024	

=== Retained ===
No.	Pos	Player	Date	Source
3	DF	Abid Ahmed	5 August 2023	
23	DF	Monir Alam	1 October 2023	
24	FW	Dipok Roy	1 October 2023	
17	FW	Nihat Jaman Ucchash	1 October 2023	
12	MF	Sujon Biswas	1 October 2023	
4	DF	Shawkat Russel	1 October 2023	

== Competitions ==
Win Draw Loss Fixtures

=== Overall ===
Competition	First match	Last match	Final Position
BPL	23 December 2023	29 May 2024	6th
Federation Cup	23 January 2024	2 April 2024	Quarter-finals
Independence Cup	27 October 2023	2 November 2023	Group stage

=== Overview ===
Competition	Record							
Competition	Pld	W	D	L	GF	GA	GD	Win %
BPL	18	4	7	7	20	24	−4	22.22
Federation Cup	3	0	0	3	2	6	−4	0.00
Independence Cup	2	1	1	0	1	0	+1	50.00
Total	23	5	8	10	23	30	−7	21.74

Source: Soccerway

=== Premier League ===
==== League table ====
Pos	Team	Pld	W	D	L	GF	GA	GD	Pts
4	Bangladesh Police FC	18	7	5	6	23	19	+4	26
5	Fortis FC	18	6	6	6	21	23	−2	24
6	Sheikh Russel KC	18	4	7	7	20	24	−4	19
7	Chittagong Abahani	18	4	7	7	22	29	−7	19
8	Sheikh Jamal DC	18	4	5	9	14	24	−10	17

Source: Soccerway
Rules for classification: 1) Points; 2) Goal difference; 3) Goals scored.

==== Results by round ====
Round	1	2	3	4	5	6	7	8	9	10	11	12	13	14	15	16	17	18
Ground	H	A	H	A	H	H	A	H	A	A	H	A	H	A	A	H	A	H
Result	W	D	L	L	D	D	L	W	D	D	L	L	L	W	D	D	W	L
Position	4	3	4	7	8	7	9	6	6	7	7	8	8	8	8	8	6	6

Source: Matches
A = Away; H = Home; W = Win; D = Draw; L = Loss; P = Postponed

==== Results summary ====
Overall								Home						Away					
Pld	W	D	L	GF	GA	GD	Pts	W	D	L	GF	GA	GD	W	D	L	GF	GA	GD
18	4	7	7	20	24	−4	19	2	3	4	9	11	−2	2	4	3	11	13	−2

Source: Soccerway

=== Matches ===
23 December 2023 1	Sheikh Russel KC	2–1	Sheikh Jamal DC	Dhaka
14:30 BST (UTC+6)	Ndikumana 5'; Kodai (yellow card) 33'; Tanvir (yellow card) 45'; Chandon (yellow card) 46'; Ganiu 49'; Nipu (yellow card) 56'; Dipok (yellow card) 90+1'	Report	Leite (yellow card) 33'; Kholmatov 59'; Kiron (red card) 45+3'	Stadium: Bashundhara Kings Arena; Referee: Saymon Hasan

29 December 2023 2	Mohammedan SC	1–1	Sheikh Russel KC	Mymensingh
14:30 BST (UTC+6)	Diabate 9' (yellow card) 56'; Molla (yellow card) 62'	Report	Jintu (yellow card) 60'; Ndikumana 64'	Stadium: Rafiq Uddin Bhuiyan Stadium; Referee: MZF Nahid

13 January 2024 3	Sheikh Russel KC	0–1	Bangladesh Police	Dhaka
14:45 BST (UTC+6)	Shahin (yellow card) 75'	Report	Karipov (yellow card) 18'; Ibargüen (yellow card) 53'; Morillo 65'	Stadium: Bashundhara Kings Arena; Referee: Bituraj Barua

20 January 2024 4	Dhaka Abahani	3–1	Sheikh Russel KC	Gopalganj
14:45 BST (UTC+6)	Fernandes 12' (yellow card) 61'; Rahmat (yellow card) 78'; Cornelius 45+2', 85'	Report	Shahin (yellow card) 61'; Reza 73'	Stadium: Sheikh Fazlul Haque Mani Stadium; Referee: Mohammed Jalal Uddin

27 January 2024 5	Sheikh Russel KC	0–0	Fortis FC	Dhaka
14:45 BST (UTC+6)	Emon (yellow card) 36'; Monir (yellow card) 51'; Chandon (yellow card) 69'	Report	Babou (yellow card) 36'; Farhad (yellow card) 43'; Jumaev (yellow card) 46'; Noyon (yellow card) 90'	Stadium: Bashundhara Kings Arena; Referee: Sobus Kumar Das

2 February 2024 6	Sheikh Russel KC	0–0	Rahmatganj MFS	Dhaka
15:00 BST (UTC+6)	Mitul (yellow card) 18'; Shahin (yellow card) 26'	Report	Tarek (yellow card) 27'; Sushanto (yellow card) 48'	Stadium: Bashundhara Kings Arena; Referee: Golam Mourshed Chowdhury Nayon

10 February 2024 7	Chittagong Abahani	2–1	Sheikh Russel KC	Munshigonj
15:00 BST (UTC+6)	Sohel 61'; Sagor 69'; Jamir (yellow card) 89'	Report	Jintu (yellow card) 42'; Chandon (yellow card) 63'; Ndikumana 90' (pen.)	Stadium: Bir Sreshtho Fl. Lt. Matiur Rahman Stadium; Referee: Mohammed Jalal Uddin

17 February 2024 8	Sheikh Russel KC	4–1	Brothers Union	Dhaka
15:00 BST (UTC+6)	Reza 5'; Landry 37', 39', 59'; Shahin (yellow card) 89'	Report	Noyon (yellow card) 43'; Insan (yellow card) 45+1'; Rahul 70'; Shoybur (yellow card) 90+3'	Stadium: Bashundhara Kings Arena; Referee: Md Mizanur Rahman

23 February 2024 9	Bashundhara Kings	1–1	Sheikh Russel KC	Dhaka
17:15 BST (UTC+6)	Bishwanath (yellow card) 28'; Dorielton (red card); Rakib 67'	Report	Ganiu (yellow card) 43'; Kodai 46'; Mitul (yellow card) 90+8'	Stadium: Bashundhara Sports Complex; Referee: Bhubon Mohon Torafder

29 March 2024 10	Sheikh Jamal DC	1–1	Sheikh Russel KC	Gopalganj
15:15 BST (UTC+6)	Kholmatov 64' (pen.); Shaymanov (yellow card) 77'; Kaushik (yellow card) 86'	Report	Sylla 22'	Stadium: Sheikh Fazlul Haque Mani Stadium; Referee: Md Jalal Uddin

6 April 2024 11	Sheikh Russel KC	1–3	Mohammedan SC	Dhaka
15:15 BST (UTC+6)	Balabanovic (pen.), 45+7' (yellow card) 69'; Sagor (yellow card) 72'; Sylla (red card) 90'; Shahin (yellow card) 90+5'	Report	Diabate 37' (pen.); Muzaffarov 72'; Iqbal 77'; Mithu (yellow card) 90'	Stadium: Bashundhara Kings Arena; Referee: Md Alamgir Sarker

19 April 2024 12	Bangladesh Police FC	1–0	Sheikh Russel KC	Mymensingh
15:45 BST (UTC+6)	Kirmane 26'; Zillur (yellow card) 51' (yellow-red card) 58'; Sokhibov (yellow card) 75'; Ahsan (yellow card) 80'	Report		Stadium: Rafiq Uddin Bhuiyan Stadium; Referee: Md Nasir Uddin

26 April 2024 13	Sheikh Russel KC	0–1	Dhaka Abahani	Dhaka
15:45 BST (UTC+6)	Balabanovic (yellow card) 21'; Shahin (yellow card) 30'; Monir (yellow card) 71'	Report	Bruninho 74'	Stadium: Bashundhara Kings Arena; Referee: Sabuj Das

4 May 2024 14	Fortis FC	1–2	Sheikh Russel KC	Rajshahi
16:00 BST (UTC+6)	Pa Omar 32'; Rashed (yellow card) 35'; Omar (yellow card) 89'	Report	Ganiu 36'; Omar 65' (o.g.); Emon (yellow card) 90+7'	Stadium: Muktijuddho Sriti Stadium; Referee: Joshim Uddin

10 May 2024 15	Rahmatganj MFS	1–1	Sheikh Russel KC	Munshigonj
16:00 BST (UTC+6)	Boateng 55'	Report	Balabanovic 62'	Stadium: Shaheed Bir Sreshtho Flight Lieutenant Matiur Rahman Stadium; Referee: Md Mizanur Rahman

17 May 2024 16	Sheikh Russel KC	1–1	Chittagong Abahani	Dhaka
16:00 BST (UTC+6)	Shahin (yellow card) 43'; Ganiu 73'	Report	Komolafe 11'; Ifegwu (yellow card) 45+1'; Dukhu Mia (yellow card) 84'	Stadium: Bashundhara Kings Arena; Referee: Mohamed Mizanur Rahman

25 May 2024 17	Brothers Union	2–3	Sheikh Russel KC	Rajshahi
16:00 BST (UTC+6)	Eleta 6', 18'; Mavlyanov (yellow card) 74'; Mbye (red card) 52'	Report	Reza 9'; Umarjonov 11'; Chandon 31'; Stepanenko (red card) 52'	Stadium: Muktijuddho Sriti Stadium; Referee: Arisuz Rahman Sagor

29 May 2024 18	Sheikh Russel KC	1–3	Bashundhara Kings	Dhaka
16:00 BST (UTC+6)	Balabanovic 13'	Report	Figueira 47'; Rakib 76'; Rakib (yellow card) 77'; Morsalin 78'; Boburbek (yellow card) 87'	Stadium: Bashundhara Kings Arena; Referee: Sabuz Kumar Das

=== Independence Cup ===
Pos	Team	Pld	W	D	L	GF	GA	GD	Pts	Qualification
1	Abahani Limited Dhaka	3	3	0	0	6	0	+6	9	Advance to Knockout stage
2	Rahmatganj MFS	3	1	1	1	4	3	+1	4	Advance to Knockout stage
3	Sheikh Russel KC	3	1	1	1	1	2	−1	4	
4	Bangladesh Air Force	3	0	0	3	1	7	−6	0	

Source: GSA
Rules for classification: Group stage tiebreakers

27 October 2023 1	Sheikh Russel KC	0–0	Rahmatganj MFS	Dhaka
14:30 BST (UTC+6)		Report	Shakil (yellow card) 9' (yellow-red card) 47'	Stadium: Bashundhara Kings Arena; Referee: Md Mizanur Rahman

30 October 2023 2	Bangladesh Air Force	0–1	Sheikh Russel KC	Munshiganj
14:30 BST (UTC+6)		Report	Dipok 61'	Stadium: Shaheed Bir Sreshtho Flight Lieutenant Matiur Rahman Stadium; Referee: Bhubon Mohon Torafder

2 November 2023 3	Dhaka Abahani	2–0	Sheikh Russel KC	Gopalganj
14:30 BST (UTC+6)	Alomgir (yellow card) 31'; Fernandes 65'; Washington 75'; Papon (yellow card) 89'	Report	Ekbal (yellow card) 47'; Abdulkhakov (yellow card) 59'	Stadium: Sheikh Fazlul Haque Mani Stadium; Referee: Md Alamgir Sarker

=== Federation Cup ===
Pos	Team	Pld	W	D	L	GF	GA	GD	Pts	Qualification
1	Bashundhara Kings	2	2	0	0	2	0	+2	6	Advance to Knockout stage
2	Fortis FC	2	1	0	1	3	2	+1	3	Advance to Knockout stage
3	Sheikh Russel KC	2	0	0	2	1	4	−3	0	Qualified as a best third place team to knockout stage

Source: Soccerway
Rules for classification: Group stages tiebreakers

23 January 2024 1	Fortis FC	3–1	Sheikh Russel KC	Munshigonj
14:45 BST (UTC+6)	Babou 10' (pen.), 72'; Bappy 51'	Report	Landry 69'	Stadium: Shaheed Bir Sreshtho Flight Lieutenant Matiur Rahman Stadium; Referee: Md Alamgir Sarker

6 February 2024 2	Sheikh Russel KC	0–1	Bashundhara Kings	Munshigonj
15:00 BST (UTC+6)	Dipok (yellow card) 90+2'	Report	Gafurov 36'; Miguel (red card) 86'	Stadium: Shaheed Bir Sreshtho Flight Lieutenant Matiur Rahman Stadium; Referee: Md Alamgir Sarker

==== Knockout phase ====
===== Quarter-final =====
2 April 2024 Quarter-final	Mohammedan SC	2–1	Sheikh Russel KC	Gopalganj
15:00 BST (UTC+6)	Muzaffarov 71'; Jafar 90+1'	Report	Sylla 1'	Stadium: Sheikh Fazlul Haque Mani Stadium; Referee: Bituraj Barua

== Statistics ==
=== Squad statistics ===
No.	Pos	Nat	Player	Total		BPL		Federation Cup		Independence Cup	
No.	Pos	Nat	Player	Apps	Goals	Apps	Goals	Apps	Goals	Apps	Goals
1	GK	(Bangladesh)	Mitul Marma	16	0	14	0	2	0	0	0
22	GK	(Bangladesh)	Rakibul Islam Tushar	6	0	3+1	0	1	0	1	0
29	GK	(Bangladesh)	Mehedi Islam Rabbani	0	0	0	0	0	0	0	0
30	GK	(Bangladesh)	Nayeem Mia	4	0	1+1	0	0	0	2	0
2	DF	(Bangladesh)	Shahin Ahammad	19	0	14	0	3	0	2	0
3	DF	(Bangladesh)	Abid Ahmed	7	0	3+3	0	0	0	1	0
4	DF	(Bangladesh)	Shawkat Russel	11	0	4+5	0	0	0	2	0
5	DF	(Nigeria)	Ganiu Ogungbe	24	3	18	3	3	0	2+1	0
13	DF	(Bangladesh)	Ariful Islam Jitu	6	0	0+2	0	1+2	0	0+1	0
14	DF	(Bangladesh)	Tanvir Hossain	14	0	5+4	0	2	0	2+1	0
15	DF	(Bangladesh)	Jintu Mia	13	0	8+1	0	1	0	2+1	0
23	DF	(Bangladesh)	Monir Alam	17	0	10+3	0	1	0	2+1	0
27	DF	(Bangladesh)	Apon Sarkar	1	0	0	0	0+1	0	0	0
31	DF	(Bangladesh)	Mohammad Sagor Miah	9	0	6+3	0	0	0	0	0
44	DF	(Ukraine)	Valeriy Stepanenko	5	0	4	0	1	0	0	0
6	MF	(Bangladesh)	Emon Mahmud Babu	20	0	14+2	0	2	0	1+1	0
7	MF	(Bangladesh)	Shahidul Islam Sumon	17	0	2+10	0	1+2	0	1+1	0
8	MF	(Japan)	Kodai Iida	11	1	11	1	0	0	0	0
26	MF	(Bangladesh)	Chandon Roy	24	1	18	1	3	0	3	0
67	MF	(Uzbekistan)	Akhror Umarjonov	5	1	4	1	1	0	0	0
95	MF	(Serbia)	Vojislav Balabanovic	8	3	8	3	0	0	0	0
16	FW	(Bangladesh)	Mohamed Munna	6	0	0+4	0	0+1	0	0+1	0
17	FW	(Bangladesh)	Nihat Jaman Ucchash	13	0	1+7	0	2	0	1+2	0
18	FW	(Bangladesh)	Ekbal Hussain	11	0	4+3	0	2	0	2	0
19	FW	(Bangladesh)	Sarower Zaman Nipu	21	0	12+4	0	1+1	0	3	0
20	FW	(Bangladesh)	Sumon Reza	21	3	15+3	3	2+1	0	0	0
24	FW	(Bangladesh)	Dipok Roy	23	1	3+14	0	1+2	0	2+1	1
45	FW	(Guinea)	Sekou Sylla	7	2	6	1	1	1	0	0
Players who left during the season
21	DF	(Kyrgyzstan)	Almazbek Malikov	1	0	1	0	0	0	0	0
12	MF	(Bangladesh)	Sujon Biswas	5	0	0+2	0	0+2	0	1	0
25	MF	(Bangladesh)	Mahadud Hossain Fahim	0	0	0	0	0	0	0	0
28	MF	(Bangladesh)	Abu Bokor	0	0	0	0	0	0	0	0
9	FW	(Haiti)	Frantzety Herard	0	0	0	0	0	0	0	0
10	FW	(Burundi)	Landry Ndikumana	13	7	9	6	2	1	2	0
11	FW	(Uzbekistan)	Abdurakhmon Abdulkhakov	3	0	0	0	0	0	1+2	0

Source: Soccerway

=== Goalscorers ===
Rank	No.	Pos.	Nat.	Player	BPL	Federation Cup	Independence Cup	Total
1	10	FW	(Burundi)	Landry Ndikumana	6	1	0	7
2	20	FW	(Bangladesh)	Sumon Reza	3	0	0	3
2	5	DF	(Nigeria)	Ganiu Ogungbe	3	0	0	3
2	95	MF	(Serbia)	Vojislav Balabanovic	3	0	0	3
5	45	FW	(Guinea)	Sekou Sylla	1	1	0	2
6
6	24	FW	(Bangladesh)	Dipok Roy	0	0	1	1
6	6	MF	(Japan)	Kodai Iida	1	0	0	1
6	26	MF	(Bangladesh)	Chandon Roy	1	0	0	1
6	67	MF	(Uzbekistan)	Akhror Umarjonov	1	0	0	1
Own goals (from the opponents)					1	0	0	1
Total					20	2	1	23

Source: Matches

=== Assists ===
Rank	No.	Pos.	Nat.	Player	BPL	Federation Cup	Independence Cup	Total
1	8	MF	(Japan)	Kodai Iida	3	0	0	3
1	20	FW	(Bangladesh)	Sumon Reza	3	0	0	3
3	23	DF	(Bangladesh)	Monir Alam	1	1	0	2
4	16	FW	(Bangladesh)	Mohamed Munna	0	0	1	1
4	26	MF	(Bangladesh)	Chandon Roy	1	0	0	1
4	6	MF	(Bangladesh)	Emon Mahmud Babu	1	0	0	1
4	15	DF	(Bangladesh)	Jintu Mia	1	0	0	1
4	24	FW	(Bangladesh)	Dipok Roy	1	0	0	1
4	44	DF	(Ukraine)	Valeriy Stepanenko	1	0	0	1
4	95	MF	(Serbia)	Vojislav Balabanovic	1	0	0	1
4	19	FW	(Bangladesh)	Sarower Zaman Nipu	1	0	0	1
4	67	MF	(Uzbekistan)	Akhror Umarjonov	1	0	0	1
Total					15	1	1	17

Source: Matches
