= 2023–24 Independence Cup (Bangladesh) =

13th season of the Independence Cup (Bangladesh)

Tournament details
- Host country: Bangladesh
- Dates: Qualifying: 20–23 October 2023; Competition proper: 27 October – 18 December 2023
- Teams: 13
- Venues: 3 (in 3 host cities)

Final positions
- Champions: Bashundhara Kings (3rd title)
- Runners-up: Dhaka Mohammedan

Tournament statistics
- Matches played: 22
- Goals scored: 45 (2.05 per match)
- Top scorer(s): (Brazil) Jonathan Fernandes (Bashundhara Kings) (Brazil) Higor Leite (Sheikh Jamal DC) (Brazil) Dorielton Gomes (Bashundhara Kings) (3 goals each)
- Best player(s): (Bangladesh) Rakib Hossain (Bashundhara Kings)
- Fair play award: Dhaka Mohammedan
- (Note: All statistics do not include qualifying play-offs)

The 2023–24 Independence Cup, also known as the 2023 Independence Cup, was the 14th edition of the Independence Cup. A total of 13 teams were contested in the final tournament.

Bashundhara Kings is the defending champion. They have won the title by beating Dhaka Mohammedan by 2−1 goals in the final on 18 December 2023.

== Participating teams ==
The following thirteen teams were participated in the tournament.

Team	Appearances	Previous best performance
Bangladesh Police FC	3rd	Semi-finals (2021–22)
Bashundhara Kings	4th	Champions (2018, 2022–23)
Brothers Union	11th	Quarter finals (2017, 2018)
Chittagong Abahani	8th	Champions (2016)
Abahani Limited Dhaka	13th	Champions (1990, 2021–22)
Mohammedan SC	13th	Champions (1972, 1991, 2014)
Fortis FC	2nd	Group stages (2022–23)
Rahmatganj MFS	13th	Semi-finals (2017)
Sheikh Russel KC	9th	Champions (2013)
Sheikh Jamal DC	9th	Runners-up (2012)
Bangladesh Army	3rd	Quarter-final (1991)
Bangladesh Navy	3rd	Group-stage (2022–23)
Bangladesh Air Force	3rd	Group-stage (2022–23)

== Venues ==
Originally the Shaheed Dhirendranath Datta Stadium in Cumilla was included as one of the host venues for the tournament, however, the district cricket league has prevented the Cumilla District Sports Association from lending the district stadium. Thus, instead of four, the tournament were held at three venues locations.

Munshigonj
Shaheed Bir Sreshtho Flight Lt. Matiur Rahman Stadium
Capacity: 10,000
Location of the stadiums for the 2023–24 Independence Cup (Bangladesh)
Gopalganj	Dhaka
Sheikh Fazlul Haque Mani Stadium	Bashundhara Kings Arena
Capacity: 5,000	Capacity: 14,000

== Round and dates ==
Dates/Year	Round	Match dates
27 October–18 December 2023	Qualifying stages	20–23 October 2023
27 October–18 December 2023	Group stages	27 October – 1 December 2023
27 October–18 December 2023	Quarter-finals	3–5 December 2023
27 October–18 December 2023	Semi-finals	15 December 2023
27 October–18 December 2023	Final	18 December 2023

== Draw ==
The draw ceremony were held on 23 October 2023 at 3rd floor of BFF house Motijheel, Dhaka. There are thirteen teams were divided into four groups. Top two team from each group will through in the Knockout stage.

== Group Summary ==
Group A	Group B
Bangladesh Police FC	Abahani Limited Dhaka
Sheikh Jamal DC	Sheikh Russel KC
Brothers Union	Rahmatganj MFS
	Bangladesh Air Force
Group C	Group D
Mohammedan SC	Bashundhara Kings
Fortis FC	Chittagong Abahani
Bangladesh Army	Bangladesh Navy

Qualifying Pair-1	Qualifying Pair-2
Bangladesh Air Force	Bangladesh Army
Bangladesh Navy	Dhaka University

== Match officials ==
The following officials were chosen for the competition.

Referees

- (Bangladesh) Jashim Akther (†)
- (Bangladesh) Md Alamgir Sarker (†)
- (Bangladesh) Md Anisur Rahman Sagor (†)
- (Bangladesh) Mahmud Zamil Farouqee Nahid (†)
- (Bangladesh) Md Mizanur Rahman
- (Bangladesh) Golam Mourshed Chowdhury Nayan
- (Bangladesh) Bituraj Barua
- (Bangladesh) Md Jalal Uddin
- (Bangladesh) Md Saymoon Hasan Sany
- (Bangladesh) Bhubon Mohon Torafder

Assistant Referees

- (Bangladesh) Md Nuruzzaman
- (Bangladesh) Sujoy Barua
- (Bangladesh) Rasel Mahmud
- (Bangladesh) Bituraj Barua
- (Bangladesh) Junayed Sharif
- (Bangladesh) Md Mizanur Rahman
- (Bangladesh) Shafiqul Islam Emon
- (Bangladesh) Bikash Sarker
- (Bangladesh) Md Mahmudul Hasan Mamun
- (Bangladesh) Sheikh Iqbal Alam
- (Bangladesh) Md Shah Alam
- (Bangladesh) Sabuj Kumar Das
- (Bangladesh) Md Shohrab Hossain
- (Bangladesh) Monir Ahmed Dhali

(†): working as both referee and assistant referee.

== Qualifying play-offs ==
Play-off 1
Team 1	Score	Team 2
Bangladesh Army	2–0	Bangladesh Air Force

Play-off 2
Team 1	Score	Team 2
Bangladesh Navy	2–0	Dhaka University

Elimination play-offs
Team 1	Score	Team 2
Bangladesh Air Force	2–0	Dhaka University

=== Matches ===
==== Play-off ====
All times at local (UTC+6)

20 October 2023
10:00

Bangladesh Air Force	0–2	Bangladesh Army
	Report	Emtiyaz Raihan 57'; Mijanur Rahman 89'

BSSS Mostafa Kamal Stadium, Dhaka
Referee: Md Anisur Rahman Sagor
20 October 2023
14:30

Dhaka University	0–2	Bangladesh Navy
	Report	Akash 24'; Jewel 72'

BSSS Mostafa Kamal Stadium, Dhaka
Referee: Md Alamgir Sarker

==== Elimination play-offs ====
23 October 2023
10:30

Bangladesh Air Force	2–0	Dhaka University
Khalidul Islam Samy 30'; Reza 63'	Report

BSSS Mostafa Kamal Stadium, Dhaka
Referee: Mahmud Zamil Farouqee Nahid

== Group stages ==
Key to colours in group tables
Group winners and runners-up advance to the Knockout-stage

Tiebreakers

Teams were ranked according to points (3 points for a win, 1 point for a draw, 0 points for a loss), and if tied on points, the following tie-breaking criteria were applied, in the order given, to determine the rankings.

1. Points in head-to-head matches among tied teams;
2. Goal difference in head-to-head matches among tied teams;
3. Goals scored in head-to-head matches among tied teams;
4. If more than two teams are tied, and after applying all head-to-head criteria above, a subset of teams are still tied, all head-to-head criteria above are reapplied exclusively to this subset of teams;
5. Goal difference in all group matches;
6. Goals scored in all group matches;
7. Penalty shoot-out if only two teams were tied and they met in the last round of the group;
8. Disciplinary points (yellow card = 1 point, red card as a result of two yellow cards = 3 points, direct red card = 3 points, yellow card followed by direct red card = 4 points);
9. Drawing of lots.

=== Group A ===
Pos	Team	Pld	W	D	L	GF	GA	GD	Pts	Qualification
1	Bangladesh Police FC	2	2	0	0	3	0	+3	6	Advance to Knockout stage
2	Sheikh Jamal DC	2	1	0	1	4	1	+3	3	Advance to Knockout stage
3	Brothers Union	2	0	0	2	0	6	−6	0	

Source: GSA
Rules for classification: Group stage tiebreakers
27 October 2023
14:30 BST (UTC+6)

Bangladesh Police FC	2–0	Brothers Union
Manas Karipov 23'; Edis Ibargüen García 67'	Report

Shaheed Bir Sreshtho Flight Lieutenant Matiur Rahman Stadium, Munshiganj
Referee: Saymoon Hasan Sany

30 October 2023
14:30 BST (UTC+6)

Brothers Union	0–4	Sheikh Jamal DC
	Report	Leite 11', 36'; Díaz 59'; Sazzad 73'

Bashundhara Kings Arena, Dhaka
Referee: Md Alamgir Sarker

2 November 2023
14:30 BST (UTC+6)

Sheikh Jamal DC	0–1	Bangladesh Police FC
	Report	Manas Karipov 26'

Bashundhara Kings Arena, Dhaka
Referee: Md Jalal Uddin

=== Group B ===
Pos	Team	Pld	W	D	L	GF	GA	GD	Pts	Qualification
1	Abahani Limited Dhaka	3	3	0	0	6	0	+6	9	Advance to Knockout stage
2	Rahmatganj MFS	3	1	1	1	4	3	+1	4	Advance to Knockout stage
3	Sheikh Russel KC	3	1	1	1	1	2	−1	4	
4	Bangladesh Air Force	3	0	0	3	1	7	−6	0	

Source: GSA
Rules for classification: Group stage tiebreakers
27 October 2023
14:30 BST (UTC+6)

Abahani Limited Dhaka	2–0	Bangladesh Air Force
Jibon (pen.), 11'; Rabiul 36'	Report

Sheikh Fazlul Haque Mani Stadium, Gopalganj
Referee: Md Anisur Rahman Sagor
27 October 2023
14:30 BST (UTC+6)

Sheikh Russel KC	0–0	Rahmatganj MFS
	Report

Bashundhara Kings Arena, Dhaka
Referee: Md Mizanur Rahman

30 October 2023
14:30 BST (UTC+6)

Bangladesh Air Force	0–1	Sheikh Russel KC
	Report	Dipok 61'

Shaheed Bir Sreshtho Flight Lieutenant Matiur Rahman Stadium
Referee: Bhubon Mohon Torafder
30 October 2023
18:00 BST (UTC+6)

Rahmatganj MFS	0–2	Abahani Limited Dhaka
	Report	Stewart 76'; Fernandes 83'

Bashundhara Kings Arena, Dhaka
Referee: Md Saymoon Hasan Sany

3 November 2023
14:30 BST (UTC+6)

Rahmatganj MFS	4–1	Bangladesh Air Force
Murad Hossain Chowdhury 33'; Samin Yasir Juel 44', 55'; Rofiqul Islam Sumon 90+4'	Report	Juwel Miah 32'

Shaheed Bir Sreshtho Flight Lieutenant Matiur Rahman Stadium, Munshiganj
Referee: Bituraj Barua

4 November 2023
14:30 BST (UTC+6)

Abahani Limited Dhaka	2–0	Sheikh Russel KC
Fernandes 65'; Washington 75'	Report

Sheikh Fazlul Haque Mani Stadium, Gopalganj
Referee: Md Alamgir Sarker

=== Group C ===
Pos	Team	Pld	W	D	L	GF	GA	GD	Pts	Qualification
1	Mohammedan SC	2	0	2	0	3	3	0	2	Advance to Knockout stage
2	Bangladesh Army	2	0	2	0	2	2	0	2	Advance to Knockout stage
3	Fortis FC	2	0	2	0	1	1	0	2	

Source: GSA
Rules for classification: Group stage tiebreakers
28 October 2023
14:30 BST (UTC+6)

Mohammedan SC	2–2	Bangladesh Army
Arif Hossain 20'; Jafar 67'	Report	Emtiyaz Raihan 9'; Ranju Sikder 24'

Bashundhara Kings Arena, Dhaka
Referee: Bituraj Barua

31 October 2023
14:30 BST (UTC+6)

Bangladesh Army	0–0	Fortis FC
	Report

Bashundhara Kings Arena, Dhaka
Referee: Md Jalal Uddin

4 November 2023
14:30 BST (UTC+6)

Fortis FC	1–1	Mohammedan SC
Gryshyn 30'	Report	Minhajul 74'

Shaheed Bir Sreshtho Flight Lieutenant Matiur Rahman Stadium, Munshiganj
Referee: Bhubon Mohon Torafder

=== Group D ===
Pos	Team	Pld	W	D	L	GF	GA	GD	Pts	Qualification
1	Bashundhara Kings	2	1	1	0	1	0	+1	4	Advance to Knockout stage
2	Chittagong Abahani	2	0	2	0	1	1	0	2	Advance to Knockout stage
3	Bangladesh Navy FT	2	0	1	1	1	2	−1	1	

Source: GSA
Rules for classification: Group stage tiebreakers
28 October 2023
18:30 BST (UTC+6)

Bashundhara Kings	1–0	Bangladesh Navy
Figueira 2'	Report

Bashundhara Kings Arena, Dhaka
Referee: Golam Mourshed Chowdhury Nayan

31 October 2023
18:00 BST (UTC+6)

Bangladesh Navy	1–1	Chittagong Abahani
Salim Reza 12'	Report	Biswas 74'

Bashundhara Kings Arena, Dhaka
Referee: Mahmud Zamil Farouqee Nahid

1 December 2023
14:30 BST (UTC+6)

Chittagong Abahani	0–0	Bashundhara Kings
	Report

Bashundhara Kings Arena, Dhaka
Referee: Bhubon Mohon Torafder

== Knockout stage ==
- In the knockout stages, if a match finished goalless at the end of normal playing time, extra time would have been played (two periods of 15 minutes each) and followed, if necessary, by a penalty shoot-out to determine the winner.

=== Bracket ===
Quarter-finals
3 Decemberv– Dhaka
Bangladesh Police FC	1
Rahmatganj MFS	2
5 December – Munshigonj
Dhaka Mohammedan	1
Chittagong Abahani	0
3 December – Dhaka
Dhaka Abahani (p)	1 (3)
Sheikh Jamal DC	1 (2)
5 December – Dhaka
Bashundhara Kings	2
Bangladesh Army	1

Semi-finals
15 December – Gopalganj
Rahmatganj MFS	0
Dhaka Mohammedan	1
15 December – Dhaka
Dhaka Abahani	0
Bashundhara Kings	4

Final
18 December – Gopalganj
Dhaka Mohammedan	1
Bashundhara Kings	2

=== Quarter-finals ===
3 December 2023
14:30

Bangladesh Police FC	1–2	Rahmatganj MFS
Edis Ibargüen García (pen.), 23'	Report	Samuel Mensah Konney 29', 31'

Bashundhara Kings Arena, Dhaka
Referee: Md Jalal Uddin
3 December 2023
18:30

Abahani Limited Dhaka	1–1	Sheikh Jamal DC
Fernandes 94'	Report	Leite 107'
Penalties
Fernandes (penalty scored); Emeka (penalty missed); Washington (penalty scored); Rabiul (penalty missed); Milad Sheykh (penalty scored)	3–2	Leite (penalty scored); Shokhrukhbek Kholmatov (penalty missed); Shakil (penalty missed); Rajib (penalty scored); Fahim (penalty missed)

Bashundhara Kings Arena
Referee: Bituraj Barua

5 December 2023
13:45

Mohammedan SC	1–0	Chittagong Abahani
Muzaffarov 97'	Report

Shaheed Bir Sreshtho Flight Lieutenant Matiur Rahman Stadium, Munshiganj
Referee: Jashim Akhter
5 December 2023
16:00

Bashundhara Kings	2–1	Bangladesh Army
Boburbek Yuldashov 38'; Dorielton 76'	Report	Emon 61'

Bashundhara Kings Arena, Dhaka
Referee: Md Alamgir Sarker

=== Semi-finals ===
15 December 2023
13:45

Rahmatganj MFS	0–1	Mohammedan SC
	Report	Muzaffarov 72'

Sheikh Fazlul Haque Mani Stadium, Gopalganj
Referee: Bituraj Barua
15 December 2023
16:00

Abahani Limited Dhaka	0–4	Bashundhara Kings
	Report	Sohel 48'; Dorielton 53'; Miguel Figueira 77'; Robinho 89' (pen.)

Bashundhara Kings Arena, Dhaka
Referee: Md Alamgir Sarker

=== Final ===
18 December 2023
13:45

Mohammedan SC	1–2	Bashundhara Kings
Emmanuel 51'	Report	Rakib 52'; Dorielton 86'

Sheikh Fazlul Haque Mani Stadium, Gopalganj
Referee: Md Jalal Uddin

== Statistics ==
=== Goalscorers ===
There have been 45 goals scored in 22 matches, for an average of 2.05 goals per match.

3 goals

- (Brazil) Jonathan Fernandes (Abahani Limited Dhaka)
- (Brazil) Higor Leite (Sheikh Jamal DC)
- (Brazil) Dorielton Gomes (Bashundhara Kings)

2 goals

- (Ghana) Samuel Mensah Konney (Rahmatganj MFS)
- (Kyrgyzstan) Manas Karipov (Bangladesh Police FC)
- (Colombia) Edis Ibargüen García (Bangladesh Police FC)
- (Bangladesh) Samin Yasir Juel (Rahmatganj MFS)
- (Uzbekistan) Muzaffar Muzaffarov (Mohammedan SC)
- (Brazil) Miguel Figueira (Bashundhara Kings)

1 goal

- (Bangladesh) Rakib Hossain (Bashundhara Kings)
- (Bangladesh) Minhajul Abedin Ballu (Mohammedan SC)
- (Bangladesh) Murad Hossain Chowdhury (Rahmatganj MFS)
- (Bangladesh) Rofiqul Islam Sumon (Rahmatganj MFS)
- Juwel Miah (Bangladesh Air Force)
- Ranju Sikder (Bangladesh Army)
- Emtiyaz Raihan (Bangladesh Army)
- (Bangladesh) Arif Hossain (Mohammedan SC)
- (Bangladesh) Jafar Iqbal (Mohammedan SC)
- (Bangladesh) Dipok Roy (Sheikh Russel KC)
- (Bangladesh) Rabiul Hasan (Abahani Limited Dhaka)
- (Bangladesh) Nabib Newaj Jibon (Abahani Limited Dhaka)
- (Bangladesh) Hemanta Vincent Biswas (Chittagong Abahani)
- Salim Reza (Bangladesh Navy)
- (Bangladesh) Sazzad Hossain (Sheikh Jamal DC)
- (Colombia) Bladimir Díaz (Sheikh Jamal DC)
- (Brazil) Washington Brandão (Dhaka Abahani)
- Shahriar Emon (Bangladesh Army)
- (Saint Vincent and the Grenadines) Cornelius Stewart (Abahani Limited Dhaka)
- (Ukraine) Valeriy Gryshyn (Fortis FC)
- (Uzbekistan) Boburbek Yuldashov (Bashundhara Kings)
- (Bangladesh) Mohamed Sohel Rana (Bashundhara Kings)
- (Brazil) Robinho Azevedo (Bashundhara Kings)
- (Nigeria) Sunday Emmanuel (Dhaka Mohammedan)

Source: GSA

== Winners ==
13th Independence Cup (Bangladesh) 2023–24
Winners
Bashundhara Kings
Third Title

== Awards ==
The following awards were given at the conclusion of the tournament:

Fair Play Award	Best goalkeeper	Best player
Mohammedan SC	None	(Bangladesh) Rakib Hossain (Bashundhara Kings)

== See also ==
- 2023–24 Federation Cup (Bangladesh)
