= 2025–26 Rahmatganj MFS season =

Rahmatganj MFS 2025–26 football season

Rahmatganj MFS
2025–26 season
- Chairman: Haji Mohammad Salim
- Head coach: Sheikh Zahidur Rahman Milon
- Bangladesh Football League: 6th of 10
- Federation Cup: Knockout stage
- Top goalscorer: League: Solomon King Kanform (5 goals each); All: Solomon King Kanform (5 goals)
- Biggest win: 2–0 Vs Rahmatganj MFS 19 October 2025 (Football League)
- Biggest defeat: 0–5 Vs Bashundhara Kings 29 November 2025 (Football League)

The 2025–26 season was the Rahmatganj MFS's 93rd season since its establishment in 1933 and its 16th season in the Bangladesh Football League. In addition to domestic league, Rahmatganj MFS participated in this season's edition of Federation Cup. The season covered period is 1 June 2025 to 23 May 2026.

== Current squad ==
Rahmatganj MFS squad for 2025–26 season.

As of 13 March 2026

Note: Flags indicate national team as defined under FIFA eligibility rules; some limited exceptions apply. Players may hold more than one non-FIFA nationality.

| No. | Pos. | Nation | Player |
|---|---|---|---|
| 1 | GK | BAN | Mohammed Mamun Alif |
| 2 | DF | BAN | Parvej Ahmed |
| 3 | DF | NEP | Abhishek Limbu |
| 4 | DF | BAN | Shahin Ahammad |
| 5 | FW | BAN | Rafiqul Islam |
| 6 | MF | BAN | Arafat Hossain |
| 7 | MF | BAN | Md Sayde (Captain) |
| 8 | FW | BAN | Mohamed Munna |
| 10 | MF | GAM | Solomon King Kanform |
| 11 | FW | BAN | Rafiqul Islam |
| 12 | FW | BAN | Md Jubayer Ahmed |
| 13 | MF | BAN | Md Arabi |
| 14 | MF | GHA | Clement Adu |
| 15 | DF | GHA | Andrews Kwadwo Appau |
| 16 | MF | BAN | Jayed Ahmed |
| 17 | FW | BAN | Mehedi Hasan Royal |

| No. | Pos. | Nation | Player |
|---|---|---|---|
| 18 | FW | GAM | Adama Jammeh |
| 19 | DF | BAN | Rajon Howladar |
| 20 | FW | BAN | Samin Yasir Juel |
| 21 | DF | BAN | Ariful Islam Jitu |
| 22 | GK | BAN | Shimul Kumar Das |
| 23 | MF | BAN | Md Faizullah |
| 24 | DF | BAN | Md Alfaj Mia |
| 25 | GK | BAN | Md Nahidul Islam |
| 26 | DF | BAN | Istekharul Alam Shakil |
| 27 | MF | BAN | Md Sadik Ahmed |
| 28 | FW | BAN | Mohammed Fahim Nur Toha |
| 29 | MF | BAN | Iqbal Hossain |
| 33 | DF | BAN | Md Shifat Sahariar |
| 36 | GK | BAN | Ahsan Habib Bipu |
| 99 | FW | BAN | Nihat Jaman Ucchash |

== Transfer ==
=== In ===
| No. | Pos | Player | Previous club | Fee | Date | Source |
|---|---|---|---|---|---|---|
| 2 | DF | (Bangladesh) Shahin Ahammad | (Bangladesh) Abahani Limited Dhaka | Free Transfer | 18 July 2025 | |
| 12 | FW | (Bangladesh) Jubayer Ahmed | (Bangladesh) Dhaka Wanderers Club | Free Transfer | 24 July 2025 | |
| 16 | MF | (Bangladesh) Jayed Ahmed | Bangladesh Police FC | Free Transfer | 24 July 2025 | |
| 11 | FW | (Bangladesh) Rafiqul Islam | (Bangladesh) Bashundhara Kings | Free Transfer | 31 July 2025 | |
| 23 | MF | (Bangladesh) Mohammad Faizullah | (Bangladesh) Abahani Limited Dhaka | Free Transfer | 1 August 2025 | |
| 25 | GK | (Bangladesh) Nahidul Islam | (Bangladesh) BFF Elite Academy | Free Transfer | 2 August 2025 | |
| 3 | FW | (Nepal) Abhishek Limbu | (Nepal) FC Chitwan | Free Transfer | 7 August 2025 | |
| 18 | FW | (The Gambia) Adama Jammeh | (The Gambia) Falcon FC (GFA League First Division) | Free Transfer | 7 August 2025 | |
| 15 | DF | (Ghana) Andrews Kwadwo Appau | (Ghana) Bofoakwa Tano F.C. | Free Transfer | 9 August 2025 | |
| 14 | MF | (Ghana) Clement Adu | (Macau) Hang Sai | Free Transfer | 15 August 2025 | |

=== Out ===
| No. | Pos | Player | Moved to | Fee | Date | Source |
|---|---|---|---|---|---|---|
| 9 | FW | (Bangladesh) Khondoker Ashraful Islam | (Bangladesh) Arambagh KS | Free Transfer | 1 July 2025 | |
| 11 | FW | (Ghana) Samuel Boateng | (Bangladesh) Mohammedan SC | Free Transfer | 9 July 2025 | |
| 14 | DF | (Bangladesh) Tanvir Hossain | (Bangladesh) Bashundhara Kings | Free Transfer | 22 July 2025 | |
| 15 | FW | (Bangladesh) Md Taj Uddin | (Bangladesh) Bashundhara Kings | Free Transfer | 26 July 2025 | |
| 10 | FW | (Bangladesh) Nabib Newaj Jibon | (Bangladesh) Bashundhara Kings | Free Transfer | 30 July 2025 | |
| 98 | MF | (Egypt) Mostafa Kahraba | (Bangladesh) Fakirerpool YMC | Free Transfer | 13 August 2025 | |
| 25 | GK | (Bangladesh) Shahidul Alam Sohel | (Bangladesh) Abahani Limited Dhaka | Free Transfer | 14 August 2025 | |

=== Retained ===
| No. | Pos | Player | Date | Source |
|---|---|---|---|---|
| 77 | FW | (The Gambia) Solomon King Kanform | 23 July 2025 | |
| 17 | FW | (Bangladesh) Mehedi Hasan Royal | 25 July 2025 | |

== Competitions ==
Win Draw Loss Fixtures

=== Overall ===
| Competition | First match | Last match | Final Position |
|---|---|---|---|
| BFL | 26 September 2025 | 23 May 2026 | |
| Federation Cup | 24 October 2025 | 5 May 2026 | Knockout stage |

=== Overview ===
| Competition | Record | | | | | | | |
| Competition | Pld | W | D | L | GF | GA | GD | Win % |
|---|---|---|---|---|---|---|---|---|
| BFL | 18 | 6 | 5 | 7 | 21 | 23 | −2 | 33.33 |
| Federation Cup | 5 | 1 | 3 | 1 | 3 | 4 | −1 | 20.00 |
| Total | 23 | 7 | 8 | 8 | 24 | 27 | −3 | 30.43 |

Source: Competitions

=== Premier League ===
==== League table ====
| Pos | Team | Pld | W | D | L | GF | GA | GD | Pts | Qualification or relegation |
|---|---|---|---|---|---|---|---|---|---|---|
| 4 | Bangladesh Police | 18 | 6 | 9 | 3 | 19 | 15 | +4 | 27 | Qualification for the AFC; Challenge League qualifying stage |
| 5 | Mohammedan | 18 | 6 | 5 | 7 | 27 | 20 | +7 | 23 | |
| 6 | Rahmatganj | 18 | 6 | 5 | 7 | 21 | 25 | −4 | 23 | |
| 7 | Brothers Union | 18 | 4 | 5 | 9 | 18 | 29 | −11 | 17 | |
| 8 | PWD | 18 | 4 | 5 | 9 | 15 | 28 | −13 | 17 | |

Source: Soccerway
Rules for classification: 1) Points; 2) Goal difference; 3) Number of goals scored.

==== Results summary ====
| Overall | | | | | | | | Home | | | | | | Away | | | | | |
| Pld | W | D | L | GF | GA | GD | Pts | W | D | L | GF | GA | GD | W | D | L | GF | GA | GD |
|---|---|---|---|---|---|---|---|---|---|---|---|---|---|---|---|---|---|---|---|
| 18 | 7 | 5 | 6 | 23 | 23 | 0 | 26 | 5 | 3 | 1 | 13 | 5 | +8 | 2 | 2 | 5 | 10 | 18 | −8 |

Source: Soccerway

==== Results by round ====
| Round | 1 | 2 | 3 | 4 | 5 | 6 | 7 | 8 | 9 | 10 | 11 | 12 | 13 | 14 | 15 | 16 | 17 | 18 |
|---|---|---|---|---|---|---|---|---|---|---|---|---|---|---|---|---|---|---|
| Ground | H | A | H | A | H | H | H | A | A | A | H | A | H | A | A | A | H | H |
| Result | D | W | W | L | W | L | W | D | D | L | W | L | D | L | L | L | W | D |
| Position | 8 | 1 | 2 | 4 | 2 | 3 | 3 | 3 | 3 | 5 | 4 | 4 | 4 | 5 | 5 | 6 | 5 | 6 |

Source: Matches
A = Away; H = Home; W = Win; D = Draw; L = Loss; P = Postponed

==== Matches ====
| 26 September 2025 1 | Rahmatganj MFS | 0–0 | Abahani Limited Dhaka | Munshiganj |
| 14:45 BST (UTC+6) | R. Howlader (yellow card) 21'; Abhishek Limbu (yellow card) 33'; Arafat Hossain (red card) 39'; Md Sayde (yellow card) 59'; S. Ahammad (yellow card) 81' | Report | P. Singh (yellow card) 26'; M. Ibrahim (yellow card) 37'; Asadul Molla (yellow card) 65' | Stadium: Shaheed Bir Sreshtho Flight Lieutenant Matiur Rahman Stadium; Referee: Md Saymoon Hasan Sany |

| 19 October 2025 2 | Fakirerpool YMC | 0–2 | Rahmatganj MFS | Manikganj |
| 14:45 BST (UTC+6) | Abu Mohamed Fofona (yellow card) 42'; Shanto Tudo (yellow card) 58' | Report | Clement Adu (yellow card) 45+1' (goal) 52'; J. Ahmed (yellow card) 57'; Mohamed Munna (yellow card) 84'; R. Howladar 90+7' | Stadium: Shaheed Miraj–Tapan Stadium; Referee: Bhubon Mohon Tarafder |

| 25 November 2025 3 | Rahmatganj MFS | 2–1 | PWD Sports Club | Munshiganj |
| 14:45 BST (UTC+6) | Clement Adu 20'; A. Jammeh (yellow card) 61'; S. Ahammad (yellow card) 67'; R. Howladar (yellow card) 78'; M. Royal 89' (yellow card) 90'; Abhishek Limbu (yellow card) 90+5' | Report | Sumon Kumar Das (yellow card) 24'; Md Sohanur Rahman Sohan (yellow card) 67'; Md Rostom Islam Dukhu Mia 70' | Stadium: Shaheed Bir Sreshtho Flight Lieutenant Matiur Rahman Stadium; Referee: Md Anisur Rahman |

| 29 November 2025 4 | Bashundhara Kings | 4–0 | Rahmatganj MFS | Dhaka |
| 17:30 BST (UTC+6) | R. Hossain 27'; F. Fahim 45'; M. Ridoy (yellow card) 61'; T. Barman 71'; E. Agbaji 75'; Md Yousuf Ali (yellow card) 77'; Dorielton 78' | Report | S. Ahammad (yellow card) 58' | Stadium: Bashundhara Kings Arena; Referee: Md Saymoon Hasan Sany |

| 6 December 2025 5 | Rahmatganj MFS | 3–0 | Arambagh KS | Munshiganj |
| 14:30 BST (UTC+6) | S. Kanform 37'; A. Limbu 42'; A. Jammeh 68' | Report | | Stadium: Shaheed Bir Sreshtho Flight Lieutenant Matiur Rahman Stadium; Referee: Mahmud Zamal Farouqee Nahid |

| 12 December 2025 6 | Rahmatganj MFS | 0–1 | Fortis FC | Munshiganj |
| 14:30 BST (UTC+6) | Istekharul Alam Shakil (yellow card) 27'; Md Sayde (yellow card) 49' | Report | O. Okafor (yellow card) 27' (goal) 90+3'; Sani Das (yellow card) 43'; Mohammad Farhad Mona (yellow card) 84' | Stadium: Shaheed Bir Sreshtho Flight Lieutenant Matiur Rahman Stadium; Referee: Mahmud Zamal Farouqee Nahid |

| 19 December 2025 7 | Rahmatganj MFS | 3–2 | Brothers Union | Munshiganj |
| 14:30 BST (UTC+6) | Md Jubayer Ahmed (yellow card) 28'; Mamun Alif (yellow card) 47'; S. Kanform 83', 88'; Clement Adu (yellow card) 54' (goal) 90'; Fahim Nur Toha (yellow card) 90+7' | Report | Marcos Rudwere Silva 15' (yellow card) 90+1'; A. Bista (yellow card) 45'; D. Brossou 75' | Stadium: Shaheed Bir Sreshtho Flight Lieutenant Matiur Rahman Stadium; Referee: Md Saymoon Hasan Sany |

| 27 December 2025 8 | Mohammedan SC | 1–1 | Rahmatganj MFS | Cumilla |
| 14:30 BST (UTC+6) | S. Boateng 62' | Report | A. Limbu 24'; Md Jubayer Ahmed (yellow card) 53'; M. Royal (yellow card) 89' | Stadium: Shaheed Dhirendranath Datta Stadium; Referee: Md Jalal Uddin |

| 3 January 2026 9 | Bangladesh Police FC | 1–1 | Rahmatganj MFS | Munshiganj |
| 14:30 BST (UTC+6) | A. Islam (red card); P. Henrique 45'; Ismail Hossen (yellow card) 90+1' | Report | S. Kanform 16' | Stadium: Shaheed Bir Sreshtho Flight Lieutenant Matiur Rahman Stadium; Referee: Md Anisur Rahman |

| 6 March 2026 10 | Abahani Limited Dhaka | 4–1 | Rahmatganj MFS | Cumilla |
| 14:30 BST (UTC+6) | B. Matos 21' (pen.), 53'; S. Tripura (yellow card) 23'; E. Ogbugh 29'; S. Morsalin (yellow card) 72'; S. Kormane 73' | Report | R. Howlader (yellow card) 13'; S. Ahammad (yellow card) 16'; Mohammed Mamun Alif (yellow card) 18'; S. Kanform 90+4' (pen.) | Stadium: Shaheed Dhirendranath Datta Stadium; Referee: Md Symoon Hasan Sany |

| 13 March 2026 11 | Rahmatganj MFS | 3–0 | Fakirerpool YMC | Munshiganj |
| 14:45 BST (UTC+6) | S. Kanform 40'; Mohammad Islam 72'; E. Boateng 84' | Report | M. Kahraba (yellow card) 20' | Stadium: Shaheed Bir Sreshtho Flight Lieutenant Matiur Rahman Stadium; Referee: Md Nasrir Uddin |

| 10 April 2026 12 | PWD Sports Club | 2–0 | Rahmatganj MFS | Gazipur |
| 15:30 BST (UTC+6) | Marat Devessa Tareck 6' (pen.) (yellow card) 70'; Sangay Yoezer (yellow card) 26' (yellow card) 37' (yellow-red card); M. Abdullah (yellow card) 35'; Md Manik (yellow card) 68'; R. Howladar 88' (o.g.); Md Shadin (yellow card) 88' | Report | R. Islam (yellow card) 26'; J. Ahmed (yellow card) 34'; R. Howladar (yellow card) 89' | Stadium: Shaheed Barkat Stadium; Referee: SM Junayed Sharif |

| 17 April 2026 13 | Rahmatganj MFS | 1–1 | Bashundhara Kings | Munshiganj |
| 15:30 BST (UTC+6) | Md Sayde (yellow card) 18'; A. Limbu (yellow card) 38' (yellow-red card) 81'; E. Boateng 42' | Report | S. Emon 13'; B. Ghosh (yellow card) 31' (yellow-red card) 67'; R. Hossain (yellow card) 67' | Stadium: Bir Sreshtho Matiur Rahman Stadium; Referee: Md Alamgir Sarker |

| 24 April 2026 14 | Arambagh KS | 1–0 | Rahmatganj MFS | Manikganj |
| 15:30 BST (UTC+6) | Shadrach Lantei-Mills (yellow card) 41'; Kwame Kizito 46' (yellow card) 90+6'; Md Shawon (yellow card) 60' | Report | Mohamed Munna (yellow card) 45+2'; Andrews Kwadwo Appau (yellow card) 81' | Stadium: Shaheed Miraj-Tapan Stadium; Referee: SM Junayed Sharif |

| 1 May 2026 15 | Fortis FC | 3–2 | Rahmatganj MFS | Dhaka |
| 15:30 BST (UTC+6) | O. Okafor 11'; P. Babou 22', 48'; Md Murshed Ali (yellow card) 61' | Report | J. Ahmed 4'; Andrews Kwadwo Appau 20' | Stadium: Bashundhara Kings Arena; Referee: Mahmud Zamal Faruqee Nahid |

| 9 May 2026 16 | Brothers Union | 3–1 | Rahmatganj MFS | Munshiganj |
| 15:45 BST (UTC+6) | S. Dost 35', 71'; Alamgir Ali Khan Ghazi 52' | Report | J. Ahmed 10'; S. Ahammad (yellow card) 78' | Stadium: Bir Sreshtho Matiur Rahman Stadium; Referee: SM Jashim Akhter |

| 15 May 2026 17 | Rahmatganj MFS | 1–0 | Mohammedan SC | Munshiganj |
| 15:45 BST (UTC+6) | J. Ahmed (yellow card) 45+4'; E. Boateng 85'; Clement Adu (yellow card) 90+1'; S. Kanform (yellow card) 90+3' | Report | M. Muzaffarov (yellow card) 45+4'; Shakil Ahmed Topu (yellow card) 51'; S. Boateng (yellow card) 90+5' | Stadium: Bir Sreshtho Matiur Rahman Stadium; Referee: Mahmud Zamal Faruqee Nahid |

| 23 May 2026 18 | Rahmatganj MFS | 0–0 | Bangladesh Police FC | Munshiganj |
| 15:45 BST (UTC+6) | M. Royal (yellow card) 42'; R. Islam (yellow card) 45+4'; Andrews Kwadwo Appau (yellow card) 56' | Report | M. Molla (yellow card) 47'; P. Henrique (penalty missed) 56' | Stadium: Bir Sreshtho Matiur Rahman Stadium; Referee: Md Symoon Hasan Sany |

=== Group A ===
| Pos | Team | Pld | W | D | L | GF | GA | GD | Pts | Qualification |
|---|---|---|---|---|---|---|---|---|---|---|
| 1 | Brothers Union | 4 | 3 | 1 | 0 | 5 | 0 | +5 | 10 | Qualified for QRF 1 |
| 2 | Rahmatganj | 4 | 1 | 3 | 0 | 3 | 1 | +2 | 6 | Advanced to QRF 2 |
| 3 | PWD SC | 4 | 2 | 0 | 2 | 3 | 5 | −2 | 6 | |
| 4 | Dhaka Abahani | 4 | 1 | 1 | 2 | 5 | 5 | 0 | 4 | |
| 5 | Fakirerpool | 4 | 0 | 1 | 3 | 2 | 7 | −5 | 1 | |

Source: Sofascore

| 24 October 2025 | Brothers Union | 0–0 | Rahmatganj MFS | Comilla |
| 14:45 BST (UTC+6) | | Report | | Stadium: Shaheed Dhirendranath Datta Stadium; Referee: Md Saymoon Hasan Sany |

| 10 March 2026 | Dhaka Abahani | 1–1 | Rahmatganj MFS | Comilla |
| 14:45 BST (UTC+6) | S. Morsalin 45+5' | Report | Samuel Boateng 9' | Stadium: Shaheed Dhirendranath Datta Stadium; Referee: Mahmud Zamal Faruqee Nahid |

| 14 April 2026 | PWD Sports Club | 0–2 | Rahmatganj MFS | Dhaka |
| 14:45 BST (UTC+6) | | Report | E. Boateng 51'; J. Ahmed 72' | Stadium: Bashundhara Kings Arena; Referee: Md Nasrir Uddin |

| 28 April 2026 | Fakirerpool YMC | 0–0 | Rahmatganj MFS | Comilla |
| 14:45 BST (UTC+6) | | Report | | Stadium: Shaheed Dhirendranath Datta Stadium; Referee: Md Symoon Hasan Sany |

==== Qualification round ====
| 5 May 2026 | Mohammedan SC | 3–0 | Rahmatganj MFS | Cumilla |
| 14:45 BST (UTC+6) | Md Jewel Mia 29', 53'; Sourav Dewan 77' | Report | | Stadium: Shaheed Dhirendranath Datta Stadium; Referee: Md Anisur Rahman |

== Statistics ==
=== Goalscorers ===
As of 23 May 2026

| Rank | Player | Position | Total | BFL | Federation Cup |
|---|---|---|---|---|---|
| 1 | (The Gambia) Solomon King Kanform | MF | 6 | 6 | 0 |
| 2 | (Ghana) Ernest Boateng | FW | 5 | 3 | 2 |
| 3 | (Bangladesh) Jayed Ahmed | MF | 4 | 3 | 1 |
| 4 | (Ghana) Clement Adu | MF | 3 | 3 | 0 |
| 5 | (Nepal) Abhishek Limbu | DF | 2 | 2 | 0 |
| 6 | (Bangladesh) Mehedi Hasan Royal | FW | 1 | 1 | 0 |
| 6 | (Bangladesh) Rafiqul Islam | FW | 1 | 1 | 0 |
| 6 | (The Gambia) Adama Jammeh | FW | 1 | 1 | 0 |
| 6 | (Ghana) Andrews Kwadwo Appau | DF | 1 | 1 | 0 |
| Total | | | 24 | 21 | 3 |
