= Bangladesh Army Stadium =

Multi-use stadium

Coordinates: 23°48′20″N 90°24′15″E

- বাংলাদেশ আর্মি স্টেডিয়াম
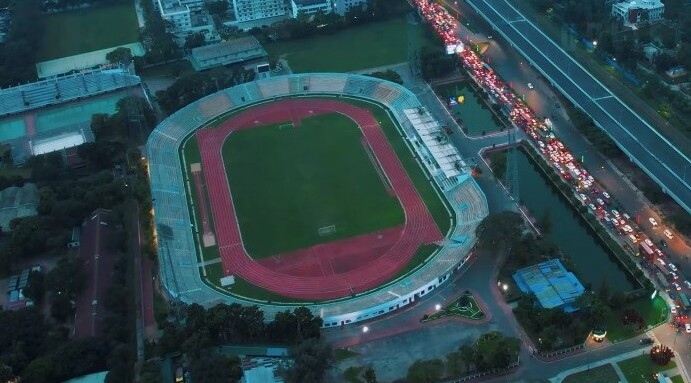
- Interactive map of Bangladesh Army Stadium
- Location: Dhaka, Bangladesh
- Owner: Bangladesh Army
- Operator: Bangladesh Army
- Capacity: 20,000
- Surface: Grass

Tenant
- Bangladesh Army football team

Website
- www.army.mil.bd

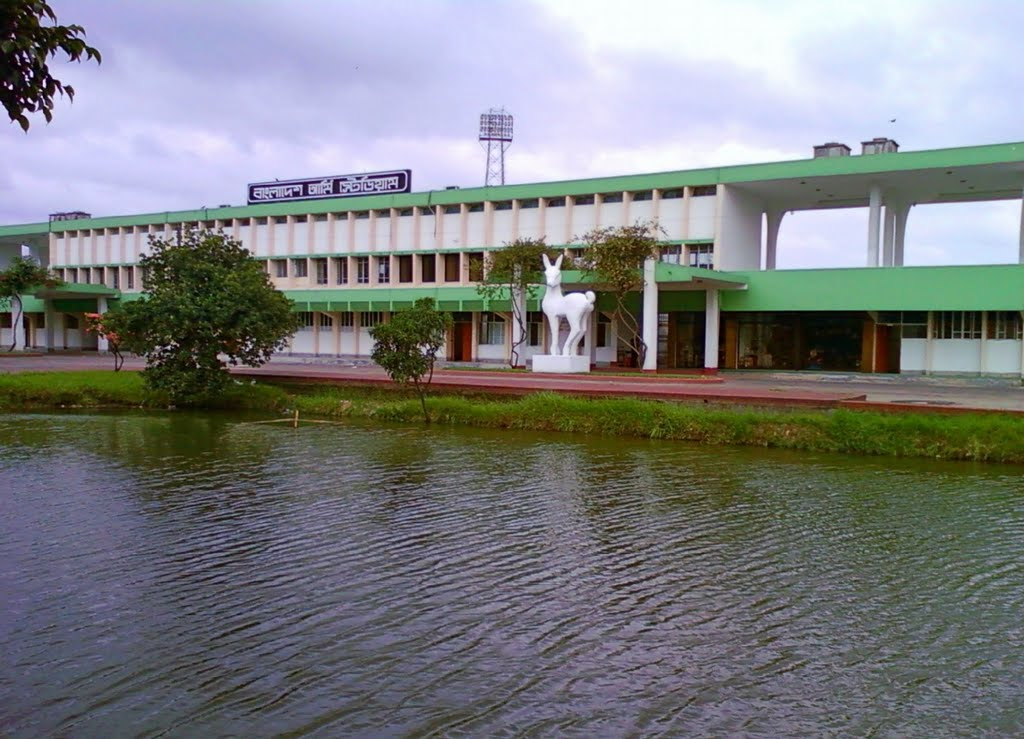
Bangladesh Army Stadium

The Bangladesh Army Stadium (formerly the Ershad Army Stadium) is a multi-purpose stadium in Dhaka, Bangladesh. It is currently used mostly for football matches, and hosts the home sport matches of the Bangladesh Army. The stadium has a capacity of 20,000.

In 2021, this stadium was used as a Covid testing venue for people going abroad.

== See also ==
- List of football stadiums in Bangladesh
- Stadiums in Bangladesh
- Bangladesh Navy football team
- Bangladesh Air Force football team
- Football in Bangladesh
- Sport in Bangladesh
