= 2021–22 Bangabandhu National Football Championship =

Tournament details
- Country: Bangladesh
- City: 64
- Venues: 64
- Dates: 3 December 2021 – March 2022
- Teams: 64

Final positions
- Champions: Bangladesh Army (2nd title)
- Runners-up: Chittagong District

Tournament statistics
- Matches played: 144
- Goals scored: 394 (2.74 per match)

The 2021–22 Bangabandhu National Football Championship is the 25th edition of the National Football Championship, the premier competition in Bangladesh for teams representing districts and government institutions. It is organized and hosted by the Bangladesh Football Federation. A total of 78 participants nation-wide will participate in the tournament.

Bangladesh Army were the defending champions having won the 2020 Bangabandhu National Football Championship.

== Participants teams ==
There are 64 participants teams were divided into eight zones.

Padma Zone	Meghna Zone	Jamuna Zone	Shitalakkhaya Zone	Brahmaputra Zone	Surma Zone	Chitra Zone	Buriganga Zone
1. Dhaka District; 2. Narayanganj District; 3. Munshiganj District; 4. Faridpur District; 5. Rajbari District; 6. Madaripur District; 7. Comilla District; 8. Shariatpur District	1. Tangail District; 2. Gazipur District; 3. Sherpur District; 4. Manikganj District; 5. Mymensingh District; 6. Netrokona District; 7. Jamalpur District; 8. Sirajganj District	1. Noakhali District; 2. Feni District; 3. Lakshmipur District; 4. Bandarban District; 5. Cox's Bazar District; 6. Khagrachari District; 7. Rangamati District; 8. Chittagong District	1. Bogra District; 2. Joypurhat District; 3. Chapainawabganj District; 4. Pabna District; 5. Naogaon District; 6. Rajshahi District; 7. Natore District; 8. Kushtia District	1. Gaibandha District; 2. Kurigram District; 3. Thakurgaon District; 4. Dinajpur District; 5. Nilphamari District; 6. Rangpur District; 7. Panchagarh District; 8. Lalmonirhat District	1. Sunamganj District; 2. Sylhet District; 3. Habiganj District; 4. Moulvibazar District; 5. Narsingdi District; 6. Chandpur District; 7. Kishoreganj District; 8. Brahmanbaria District	1. Jhalokati District; 2. Barguna District; 3. Patuakhali District; 4. Bhola District; 5. Pirojpur District; 6. Barisal District; 7. Bagerhat District; 8. Satkhira District	1. Jessore District; 2. Khulna District; 3. Narail District; 4. Meherpur District; 5. Chuadanga District; 6. Gopalganj District; 7. Magura District; 8. Jhenaidah District

== Format ==
Along with 64 districts football teams three service teams, six public universities, five education boards, and Bangladesh Krira Shikkha Protishthan will participate in the tournament. The participants districts have been divided in eight zones named Padma, Meghna, Jamuna, Shitalakshya, Brahmaputra, Surma, Chitra and Buriganga. Each zone consists eight teams except Surma, which contains seven teams. There will be knockout matches in every zone which will be played on home and away basis. In first round, a pair of teams of every zone will play each other which will decide four winners. In second round, that four winners in each zone will play zonal semifinal. In third round, the semi-final winners will face each other in zonal final. The champion from each zone will qualify for the final round.

Teams representing education boards, universities & the services teams—a total of 15 teams—are divided in four groups in Sheba zone. The teams of this zone will play on round-robin basis. Champion and runners-up of Sheba zone will join eight zonal champions in the final round.

== Championship round ==
In the championship round ten teams will contest: the eight winner teams from eight zones.

== Qualified teams ==
Team	Qualified Zones	Location	Ref
TBC	Padma	TBC	
TBC	Meghna	TBC	
Chittagong District	Jamuna	Chittagong	
Kushtia District	Shitalaykkha	Kushtia	
TBC	Brahmaputra	TBC	
TBC	Surma	TBC	
TBC	Chitra	TBC	
TBC	Buriganga	TBC	

== Statistics ==
=== Goalscorers ===
There were 394 goals scored in 144 matches, for an average of 2.74 goals per match (as of 5 January 2022).
