= 2001–02 National Football League (Bangladesh) =

1st professional season of the top-flight football league in Bangladesh

National Football League
- Season: 2001—02
- Dates: 16 April — 24 May 2002
- Champions: Dhaka Mohammedan
- Matches: 30
- Goals: 77 (2.57 per match)
- Highest scoring: 7 goals Dhaka Abahani 7–0 Barisal T&T Club
- Longest winning run: 2 matches Chittagong Abahani; Dhaka Mohammedan; Dhaka Abahani
- Longest unbeaten run: 5 matches Dhaka Abahani
- Longest winless run: 4 matches T&T Club (Barisal); Mohsin Club (Narayanganj)
- Longest losing run: 4 matches T&T Club (Barisal)
- All statistics correct as of complete. (Note: All statistics do not include qualifying play-offs)

The 2001–02 National Football League was the second season of the country's first football league held on a national scale. The league was also known as the Nitol-Tata National Football League due to sponsorship reasons.

== Background ==
The 2nd National Football League began from 10 November 2001 across the country. The preliminary and the qualifying rounds were played on knock-out basis at six divisional headquarters. The league champions from 48 districts participated in the qualifiers of their respective divisions. In Dhaka District, which belongs to Dhaka Division, the top three finishing clubs from the 2000 season of the country's top-tier football league at the time, the Dhaka Premier Division League, were given direct entry to the final round, which began from 16 April 2002.

== Qualification round ==
=== Rajshahi Division ===
| Prabaho Sangsad (Naogaon) | 2–1 | Sonali Otit (Natore) |

| Brothers Union (Pabna) | 1–0 | Reuter SC (Gaibandha) |

| Khelwar Kallyam Samity (Dinajpur) | 3–2 | Probaho Sangsad (Naogaon) |

| Reuter SC (Gaibandha) | 2–7 | Rajshahi Abahani (Rajshahi) |

| Jamuna Traders (Sirajganj) | 2–0 | New Milon Sangha (Rangpur) |

| Red Lion Club (Jaipurhat) | 2–2 | Agrani Shikkha (Lalmonirhat) |

| Abahani KC (Chapainawabganj) | 2–2 | Agamoni SC (Thakurgaon) |

| Memorial Club (Bogra) | 3–0 | Jamuna Traders (Sirajganj) |

| Red Lion Club (Joypurhat) | 2–2 | Abahani KC (Nawabganj) |

Semi-final

| Rajshahi Abahani (Rajshahi) | 6–1 | Players Welfare Association (Dinajpur) |

| Memorial Club (Bogra) | 5–1 | Red Lion Club (Joypurhat) |

Final

| Rajshahi Abahani (Rajshahi) | 3–0 | Memorial Club (Bogra) |

=== Khulna Division ===
| Ummachan Club (Bagerhat) | 1–0 | Amra Kajan Muktijoddha (Magura) |

| PK Union Club (Satkhira) | 2–2 | Shantinagar SC (Jhenaidah) |

| Khulna Abahani (Khulna) | 2–0 | Ummachan Club (Bagerhat) |

| Crescent Club (Kushtia) | 3–0; Walkover | Raipur Jagarani Club (Meherpur) |

| Uddipan Club (Chuadanga) | 3–0 | Khelwar Kally Samity (Narail) |

| Crescent Club (Kushtia) | 0–1 | Shaheed Muktijodha Smriti Sangha (Jessore) |

Semi-final

| Khulna Abahani (Khulna) | 3–2 | PK Union Club (Satkhira) |

| Uddipan Club (Chuadanga) | 0–1 | Shaheed Muktijoddha Moyeen Sangsad (Jessore) |

Final

| Khulna Abahani (Khulna) | 3–0; Walkover | Shaheed Muktijoddha Moyeen Sangsad (Chuadanga) |

=== Dhaka Division ===
| Sabuj Sena (Faridpur) | 2–0 | Mouchak Ekadash (Gazipur) |

| BNS SC (Rajbari) | 5–1 | Jagarani Club (Jamalpur) |

| Sabuj Sena (Faridpur) | 5–0 | Satpai SC (Netrokona) |

| BNS SC (Rajbari) | 1–1 (3–1 p) | Young Friends |

| GRC SC (Narsingdi) | 4–0 | Nagua SC (Kishoreganj) |

| Natun Bazar KC (Chandpur) | 1–1 (5–4 p) | Ramgati Upazila KC (Lakshmipur) |

| Al Helal Green SC (Mymensingh) | 2–0 | Football Players Welfare Association (Sherpur) |

| Abdul Latif Smriti Sangsad (Gopalganj) | 3–1 | GRC SC (Narsingdi) |

| Mohsin Club (Narayanganj) | 2–2 (2–1 p) | Al Helal Green SC (Mymensingh) |

Semi-final

| Sabuj Sena (Faridpur) | 3–1 | BNS SC (Rajbari) |

| Mohsin Club (Narayanganj) | 3–2 | Abdul Latif Smriti Sangsad (Gopalganj) |

Final

| Mohsin Club (Narayanganj) | 1–1 (3–2 p) | Sabuj Sena (Faridpur) |

=== Chittagong Division ===
| Friends Club (Noakhali) | 2–0 | Comilla Mohammedan (Comilla) |

| Tarun Muslim Club (Cox's Bazar) | 4–0 | New Nation Club (Brahmanbaria) |

| Chittagong Abahani (Chittagong) | 2–0 | Feni SC (Feni) |

| Tarun Muslim Club (Cox's Bazar) | 3–0 | Friends Club (Noakhali) |

Final

| Chittagong Abahani (Chittagong) | 2–1 | Natun Bazar (Chandpur) |

- Note: Some matches are unrecorded.

=== Sylhet Division ===
| Target SC (Sunamganj) | 2–2 (4–2 p) | Raj Nagar Ekadash (Habiganj) |

Final

| Chaturanga Jubo Sangha (Sylhet) | 3–1 | Target SC (Sunamganj) |

- Note: Some matches are unrecorded.

=== Barisal Division ===
| Abahani KC (Barguna) | 5–0 | Friends Club (Barisal) |

| Udaykathi Jubu Samity (Pirojpur) | 3–0; Walkover | Abahani KC (Jhalokati) |

Semi-final

| Udaykathi Jubu Samity (Pirojpur) | 2–2 (3–1 p) | Kalinath Ekota Sangha (Bhola) |

| T and T Club (Barisal) | 3–0 | Abahani KC (Barguna) |

Final

| T and T Club (Barisal) | 0–0 (3–1 p) | Udaykathi Jubo Samity (Pirojpur) |

=== Services Zone ===
| Bangladesh Navy | 2–0 | Bangladesh Air Force |

| Bangladesh Army | 3–0; Walkover | Bangladesh Police |

Final

| Bangladesh Army | 1–0 | Bangladesh Navy |

== Final round ==
=== Participating clubs ===
| Team | Location | Appearances | Qualification method |
|---|---|---|---|
| Muktijoddha Sangsad KC | Dhaka | 2nd | 2000 Dhaka Premier Division League Champions |
| Dhaka Abahani | Dhaka | 2nd | 2000 National League Champions |
| Dhaka Mohammedan | Dhaka | 2nd | 2000 National League Runners-up |
| Rajshahi Abahani KC | Rajshahi | 2nd | Rajshahi Division qualifiers Champions |
| Khulna Abahani KC | Khulna | 2nd | Khulna Division qualifiers Champions |
| Narayanganj Mohsin Club | Narayanganj | 1st | Dhaka Division qualifiers Champions |
| Chittagong Abahani | Chittagong | 2nd | Chittagong Division qualifiers Champions |
| Chaturanga Jubo Sangha | Sylhet | 2nd | Sylhet Division qualifiers Champions |
| Barisal T and T Club | Barisal | 1st | Barisal Division qualifiers Champions |
| Bangladesh Army | | 1st | Services Zone qualifiers Champions |

=== Group stage ===
==== Group A ====
| Pos | Team | Pld | W | D | L | GF | GA | GD | Pts | Qualification |
|---|---|---|---|---|---|---|---|---|---|---|
| 1 | Dhaka Abahani | 4 | 2 | 2 | 0 | 9 | 0 | +9 | 8 | Qualification for Super Four |
| 2 | Chaturanga JS | 4 | 2 | 2 | 0 | 11 | 4 | +7 | 8 | Qualification for Super Four |
| 3 | Bangladesh Army | 4 | 2 | 2 | 0 | 5 | 3 | +2 | 8 | |
| 4 | Khulna Abahani | 4 | 1 | 0 | 3 | 6 | 9 | −3 | 3 | |
| 5 | Barisal T and T Club | 4 | 0 | 0 | 4 | 1 | 16 | −15 | 0 | |

Source: rsssf.com

===== Matches =====
| 16 April 2002 | Dhaka Abahani (Dhaka) | 0–0 | Chaturanga Jubo Sangha (Sylhet) |

| 19 April 2002 | Bangladesh Army | 1–0 | Khulna Abahani (Khulna) |

| 24 April 2002 | Chaturanga Jubo Sangha (Sylhet) | 4–2 | Khulna Abahani (Khulna) |

| 26 April 2002 | Dhaka Abahani (Dhaka) | 7–0 | T and T Club (Barisal) |

| 28 April 2002 | Chaturanga Jubo Sangha (Sylhet) | 2–2 | Bangladesh Army |

| 3 May 2002 | Dhaka Abahani (Dhaka) | 2–0 | Khulna Abahani (Khulna) |

| 6 May 2002 | Chaturanga Jubo Sangha (Sylhet) | 5–0 | T and T Club (Barisal |

| 6 May 2002 | Bangladesh Army | 2–1 | Khulna Abahani (Khulna) |

| 10 May 2002 | Dhaka Abahani (Dhaka) | 0–0 | Bangladesh Army |

| 14 May 2002 | Khulna Abahani (Khulna) | 3–1 | T and T Club (Barisal) |

==== Group B ====
| Pos | Team | Pld | W | D | L | GF | GA | GD | Pts | Qualification |
|---|---|---|---|---|---|---|---|---|---|---|
| 1 | Chittagong Abahani | 4 | 2 | 2 | 0 | 5 | 2 | +3 | 8 | Qualification for Super Four |
| 2 | Dhaka Mohammedan | 4 | 2 | 2 | 0 | 5 | 3 | +2 | 8 | Qualification for Super Four |
| 3 | Rajshahi Abahani | 4 | 2 | 1 | 1 | 7 | 6 | +1 | 7 | |
| 4 | Muktijoddha Sangsad | 4 | 1 | 0 | 3 | 7 | 5 | +2 | 3 | |
| 5 | Narayanganj Mohsin Club | 4 | 0 | 1 | 3 | 2 | 10 | −8 | 1 | |

Source: rsssf.com

===== Matches =====
| 18 April 2002 | Dhaka Mohammedan (Dhaka) | 0–0 | Mohsin Club (Narayanganj) |

| 20 April 2002 | Rajshahi Abahani (Rajshahi) | 2–1 | Mohsin Club (Narayanganj) |

| 21 April 2002 | Chittagong Abahani (Chittagong) | 1–0 | Muktijoddha Sangsad KC (Dhaka) |

| 25 April 2002 | Dhaka Mohammedan (Dhaka) | 2–1 | Muktijoddha Sangsad KC (Dhaka) |

| 27 April 2002 | Chittagong Abahani (Chittagong) | 1–1 | Rajshahi Abahani (Rajshahi) |

| 2 May 2002 | Chittagong Abahani (Chittagong) | 0–0 | Dhaka Mohammedan (Dhaka) |

| 5 May 2002 | Muktijoddha Sangsad KC (Dhaka) | 5–0 | Mohsin Club (Narayanganj) |

| 9 May 2002 | Rajshahi Abahani (Rajshahi) | 2–1 | Muktijoddha Sangsad KC (Dhaka) |

| 11 May 2002 | Chittagong Abahani (Chittagong) | 3–1 | Mohsin Club (Narayanganj) |

| 12 May 2002 | Rajshahi Club (Rajshahi) | 2–3 | Dhaka Mohammedan (Dhaka) |
Note: riots left over 100 injured

=== Super Four ===
| Pos | Team | Pld | W | D | L | GF | GA | GD | Pts |
|---|---|---|---|---|---|---|---|---|---|
| 1 | Dhaka Mohammedan | 3 | 2 | 0 | 1 | 4 | 1 | +3 | 6 |
| 2 | Dhaka Abahani | 3 | 2 | 0 | 1 | 5 | 3 | +2 | 6 |
| 3 | Chittagong Abahani | 3 | 2 | 0 | 1 | 6 | 6 | 0 | 6 |
| 4 | Chaturanga JS | 3 | 0 | 0 | 3 | 1 | 6 | −5 | 0 |

Source: rsssf.com

==== Matches ====
Normal round

| 26 May 2002 | Dhaka Abahani (Dhaka) | 2–0 | Chaturanga Jubo Sangha (Sylhet) |

| 26 May 2002 | Dhaka Mohammedan (Dhaka) | 3–0 | Chittagong Abahani (Chittagong) |

| 18 May 2002 | Dhaka Abahani (Dhaka) | 1–0 | Dhaka Mohammedan (Dhaka) |

| 18 May 2002 | Chittagong Abahani (Chittagong) | 3–1 | Chaturanga Jubo Sangha (Sylhet) |

| 20 May 2002 | Chittagong Abahani (Chittagong) | 3–2 | Dhaka Abahani (Dhaka) |

| 20 May 2002 | Dhaka Mohammedan (Dhaka) | 1–0 | Chaturanga Jubo Sangha (Sylhet) |

Semi-final

| 22 May 2002 | Dhaka Mohammedan (Dhaka) | abd. (1–0 in 45') | Chittagong Abahani (Chittagong) |

| 22 May 2002 | Dhaka Abahani (Dhaka) | 1–0 | Chaturanga Jubo Sangha (Sylhet) |

Semi-final replay

| 23 May 2002 | Dhaka Mohammedan (Dhaka) | 2–0 | Chittagong Abahani (Chittagong) |

Final

| 24 May 2002 | Dhaka Mohammedan (Dhaka) | 0–0 (6–5 p) | Dhaka Abahani (Dhaka) | Dhaka |
| | | | | Stadium: Bangabandhu National Stadium; Referee: Monsur Azad |

== Champions ==
2nd Bangladesh National Football League 2001–02
Winners
Dhaka Mohammedan
First Title
