= Dhaka University football team =

Dhaka University
- Full name: Dhaka University Football Team
- Nickname: Dhabian
- Short name: DU
- Founded: 1921; 105 years ago
- Ground: Dhaka University Ground
- Owner: Dhaka University
- League: National Football Championship
- Website: du.ac.bd

Dhaka University Football Team (Bengali: ঢাকা বিশ্ববিদ্যালয় ফুটবল দল) represents the Dhaka University in football and competes in the National Football Championship, which is the main district tournament in the country. They also participate in the Inter-University Championship and Independence Cup.

== Honours ==
=== Cups ===
- Sher-e-Bangla Cup/National Football Championship
  - Winners (5): 1980*, 1981*, 1990, 1992, 1996
  - Runners-up (3): 1985, 1989, 1994

*: Joint winners

- Independence Day Football Tournament
  - Winners (2): 1949, 1953
  - Runners-up (1): 1958

== Notable players ==
The players below have senior international cap(s) for the Bangladesh national football team.

- Kaiser Hamid (1984)
- Saifur Rahman Moni (2005–06)
- Anisur Rahman Zico
- Shekh Morsalin

== See also ==
- BKSP football team
- Bangladesh Army football team
- Bangladesh Navy football team
- Bangladesh Air Force football team
- Football in Bangladesh
