= Chandon Roy =

Bangladeshi footballer

Personal information
- Full name: Chandon Roy
- Date of birth: 4 May 2007 (age 19)
- Place of birth: Nilphamari, Bangladesh
- Height: 1.70 m (5 ft 7 in)
- Position: Defensive midfielder

Team information
- Current team: Bashundhara Kings
- Number: 14

Senior career*
Years	Team	Apps	(Gls)
2021–2024	BFF Elite Academy	38	(0)
2023–2024	→ Sheikh Russel KC (loan)	18	(1)
2024–	Bashundhara Kings	12	(0)

International career^{‡}
2022	Bangladesh U17	6	(0)
2023–2026	Bangladesh U20	10	(0)
2024–	Bangladesh	5	(0)
Medal record
Men's football
Representing Bangladesh
SAFF U-20 Championship
Winner	2024 Nepal	Team
Winner	2026 Maldives	Team
- * Club domestic league appearances and goals as of 24 May 2026 ‡ National team caps and goals as of 3 April 2026

Chandon Roy (Bengali: চন্দন রায়, Bengali pronunciation: [tʃɔnd̪on rɔj]; born 4 May 2007) is a Bangladeshi professional footballer who plays as a defensive midfielder for Bangladesh Premier League club Bashundhara Kings and the Bangladesh national team.

== Early career ==
Chandon was born in Amnagar village of Nilphamari Sadar. While still in seventh grade he was trained in the Academy of District Sports Association. In 2019, he came to Dhaka with Chamir Uddin School and College to participate in the Clear Men U-17 Football Championship, where 272 schools across the country participated. After his school finished in third-place, Chandon was selected among the best six players of the tournament, securing an opportunity to practice with English club Manchester City. However, due to the COVID-19 pandemic his trip to Manchester was canceled. Initially opposed to his decision to pursue football as a career, Chandon's father, Gaurang Roy, changed his stance in February 2021 when Chandon successfully trialed for the BFF Elite Football Academy.

== Club career ==
=== BFF Elite Academy ===
After passing trials at the BFF Elite Football Academy, Chandon made his professional league debut in the 2021–22 Bangladesh Championship League, coming on as a 62nd-minute substitute against NoFeL SC in the academy's inaugural league game on 20 February 2022. He was part of the Starting XI for the first time on 3 March 2022 in a 2–0 victory over Gopalganj SC. Chandon was made vice-captain during the second phase of the league and also served as captain during games against AFC Uttara and Agrani Bank SC. Chandon came on as a substitute during all three games in the 2022–23 Independence Cup. He was ever-present in the Elite Academy team during the 2022–23 Bangladesh Championship League and also captained them during four games when main captain, Imran Khan, was injured.

==== Sheikh Russel KC (loan) ====
On 26 August 2023, Chandon made Bangladeshi football history by becoming the first player to transfer clubs through an auction, joining Sheikh Russel KC for Tk 9 lakh on a season-long loan. On 27 October 2023, he made his debut for the club against Rahmatganj MFS in the 2023–24 Independence Cup. He played 90 minutes in all three fixtures in the tournament as Sheikh Russel failed to advance past the group-stages, however, it was enough for Chandon to get his maiden Bangladesh national team callup.

== International career ==
=== Youth ===
On 5 September 2022, Chandon made his debut for the Bangladesh U17 team during a 5–1 victory against Sri Lanka U17 in the 2022 SAFF U-17 Championship. He also played in the 2023 AFC U-17 Asian Cup qualifiers held in Dhaka. In the same year, Chandon was allowed to train with the senior national team as a guest player, after impressing coach, Javier Cabrera. In 2023, he represented the Bangladesh U20 team during a disappointing 2023 SAFF U-19 Championship campaign.

=== Senior ===
On 5 November 2023, he earned his first callup to the Bangladesh national team as part of a 30-member preliminary squad for the 2026 FIFA World Cup qualification – AFC second round. On 28 February 2024, Chandon was included in the national team preliminary squad for home and away fixtures against Palestine in the second round of the World Cup qualifiers.

On 21 March 2024, at 16 years and 321 days old, Chandon made his senior international debut, coming on as a 72nd-minute substitute during a 0–5 defeat to Palestine in the FIFA World Cup second round.

== Style of play ==
After being selected as one of the best six players of the Clear Men U-17 Football Championship, he was compared to Bangladesh national team captain Jamal Bhuyan. Chandon's coach in Sheikh Russel KC and former national team midfielder, Abdul Baten Komol, has praised his positioning sense and ability to read the games pace. His coaches in the BFF Elite Academy have also stated that, although Chandon possesses potential, his first touch needs improvement if he wishes to become a senior international.

== Career statistics ==
=== Club ===
As of 23 February 2024.

Appearances and goals by club, season and competition
Club	Season	League			Domestic Cup (Note: Appearance(s) in Bangladesh Federation Cup)		Other		Continental		Total	
Club	Season	Division	Apps	Goals	Apps	Goals	Apps	Goals	Apps	Goals	Apps	Goals
BFF Elite Academy	2021–22	Bangladesh Championship League	18	0	—		—		—		18	0
BFF Elite Academy	2022–23	Bangladesh Championship League	20	0	—		3 (Note: Appearance(s) in Bangladesh Independence Cup)	0	—		23	0
BFF Elite Academy	BFF Elite Academy total		38	0	0	0	3	0	0	0	41	0
Sheikh Russel KC (loan)	2023–24	Bangladesh Premier League	9	0	2	0	3	0	—		14	0
Career total			47	0	2	0	6	0	0	0	55	0

=== International ===
As of 6 June 2024.

Bangladesh
Year	Apps	Goals
2024	2	0
Total	2	0

== Honours ==
Bangladesh U-20

- SAFF U-20 Championship: 2024, 2026
