= Adama Jammeh =

Adama Jammeh may refer to:

- Adama Jammeh (sprinter)
- Adama Jammeh (footballer)
