= Shahajuddin Tipu =

Bangladeshi footballer

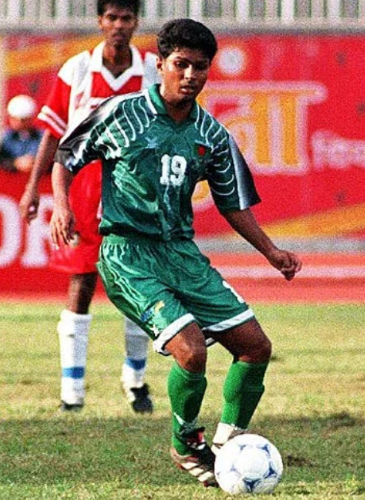
- Tipu in action for Bangladesh against India at the 1999 South Asian Games semi-final

Personal information
- Full name: Shahajuddin Tipu
- Date of birth: 16 January 1974 (age 52)
- Place of birth: Rangamati, Bangladesh
- Height: 1.74 m (5 ft 8 1/2 in)
- Position: Striker

Youth career
- 1992–1994: Kallol Sangha

Senior career*
Years	Team	Apps	(Gls)
1994–1996	Eskaton		
1996	Brothers Union		
1996–1998	Dhaka Abahani		
1999–2001	Rahmatganj		
2000	→ Dhaka Abahani (loan)		
2001–2002	Dhaka Mohammedan		
2002–2003	Rahmatganj		
2003	→ Chittagong Mohammedan (loan)		
2003–2004	Muktijoddha		
2005–2009	Dhaka Abahani		
2009–2010	Muktijoddha		

International career
1996	Bangladesh U19		
1997–2005	Bangladesh		
Medal record
Men's football
Representing Bangladesh
South Asian Games
Gold medal – first place	1999 Kathmandu
SAFF Championship
Runner-up	1999 India
Runner-up	2005 Pakistan
- * Club domestic league appearances and goals

Shahajuddin Tipu (Bengali: শাহাজউদ্দিন টিপু; born 16 January 1974) is a retired Bangladeshi professional footballer who played in the Bangladesh national team from 1997 to 2005.

== Club career ==
Tipu began his career with Eskaton Sabuj Sangha Club in the Dhaka First Division League in 1994. He was made the club captain the following year, as Eskaton were relegated to the Second Division, nonetheless, Tipu attracted the attention of Premier Division club Brothers Union, joining them in 1996.

Tipu represented Dhaka Abahani during the 1996–97 Bangabandhu Cup and managed to score the first goal of the tournament against Malaysia Red. He was also part of the Abahani squad which lifted the 2000 National League title. He also won the 2001–02 edition of the tournament with Dhaka Mohammedan. However, his stints at major clubs such as Abahani and Mohammedan were cut-short due to club bindings.

In 2005, Tipu returned to Abahani and cemented his status as a super-sub during his final stint at the club. During a 2009 AFC President's Cup group-stage game against Sri Lanka Army, Tipu came on as a 72nd-minute substitute and scored the winner within a minute with his first touch. He also managed to win consecutive B.League titles before transferring to Muktijoddha Sangsad KC in 2009.

== International career ==
In 1996, Otto Pfister included Tipu in the Bangladesh U19 team which defeated Maldives 8–0 in aggregate to qualify for the 1996 AFC Youth Championship. During the second-leg of the qualifiers, Tipu scored a hat-trick as Bangladesh thrashed Maldives U19 5–0. Nonetheless, he was less impressive in the main tournament held in Seoul, South Korea, as Bangladesh finished bottom of their group.

The following year, Otto Pfister handed Tipu his Bangladesh national team debut at the 1997 SAFF Gold Cup. Tipu most memorable international match came during the 1999 South Asian Games semi-final against India. Tipu who came on as a second-half substitute scored the game's only goal from a long-range shot ensuring Bangladesh's place in the final. In the final Bangladesh won gold by defeated hosts Nepal 1–0.

After a four-year absence from the national team, Tipu was recalled by Andrés Cruciani for the 2005 SAFF Gold Cup. During the tournament, he made his final international appearance in a 1–1 draw with India in group-stages.

== Personal life ==
In 2020, Tipu auctioned the jersey he wore during the 1999 South Asian Games semi-final against India to raise money for people suffering from the COVID-19 pandemic in Bangladesh.

== Career statistics ==
=== International goals ===
List of international goals scored by Shahajuddin Tipu
No.	Date	Venue	Opponent	Score	Result	Competition	Ref.
1	2 October 1999	Dasharath Rangasala, Kathmandu, Nepal	India	1–0	1–0	1999 South Asian Games	

== Honours ==
Abahani Limited Dhaka

- Bangladesh Premier League: 2007, 2008–09
- National League: 2000
- Federation Cup: 1997
- Independence Day Tournament (Rajshahi): 2005
- Victory Day Club Cup: 2008

Mohammedan SC

- National League: 2001–02

Muktijoddha Sangsad KC

- National League: 2003
- Federation Cup: 2003

Bangladesh

- South Asian Games Gold medal: 1999
