= Dhaka University Ground =

Sports venue in Dhaka, Bangladesh

Coordinates: 23.726428°N 90.399480°E

- Interactive map of Dhaka University Ground
- Location: Dhaka
- Country: Bangladesh
- Owner: University of Dhaka

Dhaka University Ground is a major public ground hosting matches of domestic and inter-collegiate cricket and football in Dhaka, the capital of Bangladesh.

Only first class cricket match held on 21 May 1966 between Decca Vs. Public Works Department.

The ground hosted inter-hall, intra hall sports every year. It is also used for university's convocation ceremony.

== See also ==
- Dhaka University football team
