= Shahin Ahammad =

Bangladeshi footballer

Personal information
- Full name: Shahin Ahammad
- Date of birth: 5 June 2004 (age 22)
- Place of birth: pakundia Kishoreganj, Bangladesh
- Height: 1.68 m (5 ft 6 in)
- Position: Right-back

Team information
- Current team: Mohammedan
- Number: 15

Youth career
- 2019–2020: Bashundhara Kings Jr.

Senior career*
Years	Team	Apps	(Gls)
2020–2021	Bangladesh Police	0	(0)
2021–2022	Sheikh Jamal DC	18	(0)
2022–2023	Fortis	20	(1)
2023–2024	Sheikh Russel	14	(0)
2024–2025	Dhaka Abahani	4	(0)
2025–2026	Rahmatganj	16	(0)
2026–	Mohammedan	0	(0)

International career^{‡}
2022	Bangladesh U20	8	(1)
2023–	Bangladesh U23	3	(0)
Medal record
Men's football
Representing Bangladesh
SAFF U-20 Championship
Runner-up	2022 India	Team
- * Club domestic league appearances and goals as of 23 May 2026 ‡ National team caps and goals as of 12 September 2023

Shahin Ahammad (Bengali: শাহিন আহমেদ; born 5 June 2004), also known as Shahin Mia, is a Bangladeshi professional footballer who plays as a right-back for Bangladesh Football League club Mohammedan.

== Club career ==
Shahin started his career with the junior team of Bashundhara Kings. In 2021, he made his career breakthrough with Sheikh Jamal Dhanmondi Club during the 2021 Independence Cup and was played as the first choice right-back by coach Juan Manuel Martínez, due to the absence of the club's senior players.

On 5 December 2021, his curling effort from the right flank against Sheikh Russel KC saw the Dhanmondi based club advance to the semi-finals of the tournament.

In August 2022, Shahin joined newly promoted Fortis FC after his impressive performances with the Bangladesh U20 national team. On 24 February 2023, he scored his first professional league goal, coming in a 1–1 draw against his former club, Sheikh Jamal Dhanmondi.

In July 2023, Sheikh Russel KC announced that the club had registered Shahin for the upcoming season.

== International career ==
In 2022, Shahin represented the Bangladesh U20 team in both the 2022 SAFF U-20 Championship and 2023 AFC U-20 Championship qualifiers. On 5 August 2022, he scored in the 48th minute during the SAFF U-20 Championship final to put Bangladesh 2–1 up against India U20 in a match which they eventually lost 2–5.

Shahin represented Bangladesh U23 during the 2024 AFC U-23 Asian Cup qualifiers. He was selected in the final squad for the 2022 Asian Games in Hangzhou, China.

== Career statistics ==
=== Club ===
As of 27 May 2025.

Appearances and goals by club, season and competition
Club	Season	League			Domestic Cup (Note: Appearance(s) in Bangladesh Federation Cup)		Other (Note: Appearance(s) in Bangladesh Independence Cup)		Continental		Total	
Club	Season	Division	Apps	Goals	Apps	Goals	Apps	Goals	Apps	Goals	Apps	Goals
Bangladesh Police	2020–21	Bangladesh Premier League	0	0	0	0	—		—		0	0
Sheikh Jamal DC	2021–22	Bangladesh Premier League	18	0	0	0	4	1	—		22	1
Fortis	2022–23	Bangladesh Premier League	20	1	2	0	3	0	—		25	1
Sheikh Russel KC	2023–24	Bangladesh Premier League	14	0	3	0	2	0	—		19	0
Dhaka Abahani	2024–25	Bangladesh Premier League	4	0	3	0	0	0	—		7	0
Rahmatganj MFS	2025–26	Bangladesh Premier League	0	0	0	0	0	0	—		0	0
Career total			56	1	8	0	9	1	0	0	73	2

=== International goals ===
==== Youth ====
Scores and results list Bangladesh's goal tally first.

No.	Date	Venue	Opponent	Score	Result	Competition
1.	5 August 2022	Kalinga Stadium, Bhubaneswar, India	India	2–1	2–5	2022 SAFF U-20 Championship
