= Abhishek Limbu =

Nepali footballer (born 1999)

Personal information
- Full name: Abhishek Limbu
- Date of birth: 21 August 1999 (age 27)
- Place of birth: Morang, Nepal
- Height: 1.75 m (5 ft 9 in)
- Position: Center-back

Team information
- Current team: Rahmatganj
- Number: 3

Senior career*
Years	Team	Apps	(Gls)
2021–2022	Chyasal Youth Club	12	(0)
2022	→ Butwal Lumbini (loan)		
2023–2025	Khumaltar	24	(1)
2023–2024	→ Chitwan (loan)	7	(0)
2025–	Rahmatganj	16	(2)

International career^{‡}
2024–	Nepal	5	(0)
- * Club domestic league appearances and goals as of 26 May 2026 ‡ National team caps and goals as of 6 September 2025

Abhishek Limbu (Nepali: अभिषेक लिम्बु; born 21 August 1999), is a Nepalese professional footballer who plays as a center-back for Bangladesh Football League club Rahmatganj MFS and the Nepal national team.

== Early life ==
Abhishek Limbu was born on 21 August 1999 in Letang, Morang District, Nepal.

== Club career ==
In August 2025, Limbu joined Bangladesh Football League club Rahmatganj MFS.

== International career ==
On 21 March 2023, Limbu made his debut for the Nepal national team in a 0–5 defeat against Bahrain in the 2026 FIFA World Cup qualification – AFC second round.
