= National Football Championship (Bangladesh) =

Football tournament in Bangladesh

- Founded: 1973; 53 years ago
- Region: Bangladesh
- Teams: Various
- Current champions: Bangladesh Army (5th title)
- Most championships: Bangladesh Army; Dhaka University (5 titles each)
- Broadcaster: Bangladesh Football Federation TV
- Website: bff.com.bd
- 2025 National Football Championship

The National Football Championship (Bengali: জাতীয় ফুটবল চ্যাম্পিয়নশিপ), previously known as the Sher-e-Bangla National Football Championship or the Sher-e-Bangla Cup or the Bangabandhu National Football Championship, is a district-level national football tournament in Bangladesh, contested by districts and government institutions of the country. The tournament is run under the supervision of the Bangladesh Football Federation (BFF).

== History ==
Following the independence of Bangladesh, the tournament was reintroduced in 1973 as an inter-district national football competition contested by the district teams and government institutions under the Bangladesh Football Federation (BFF). On 10 January 2020, the BFF decided to revive the National Championship after a gap of 13 years, celebrating the 100th birth anniversary of Bangabandhu Sheikh Mujibur Rahman. Upon its resumption, it was renamed the Bangabandhu National Football Championship.

== Format ==
Along with 64 districts football teams, three service teams, six public universities, five education boards, and Bangladesh Krira Shikkha Protishthan participate in the tournament. The participant districts have been divided into eight zones named Padma, Meghna, Jamuna, Shitalakshya, Brahmaputra, Surma, Chitra and Buriganga. Each zone consists of eight teams, except Surma, which contains seven teams. Knockout matches in every zone are played on a home and away basis. In the first round, a pair of teams from every zone play each other to decide four winners. In the second round, the four winners play the zonal semifinal. In the third round, the semi-final winners face each other in the zonal final. The champion from each zone qualify for the final round.

Teams representing education boards, universities, and the services teams—a total of 15 teams—are divided in four groups in Sheba zone. The teams of this zone play on a round-robin basis. Top two join eight zonal winners in the final round.

== Results ==
Season	Winner	Runner-up	Top scorer	Goals
1973	Dhaka District	Kushtia District		
1974	Dhaka District	Barisal District		
1975	Dhaka District	Chittagong District		
1976	Jessore District	Rajshahi District		
1977	Kushtia District	Chittagong District		
1978	Barisal District	Rangpur District		
1979	Barisal District	Dhaka District		
1980	Bangladesh Army and Dhaka University (joint winners)			
1981	Bangladesh Army and Dhaka University (joint winners)			
1982	Khulna District	Bangladesh Army		
1983	Sylhet District	Dhaka District		
1984	Feni District	Dhaka District		
1985	Comilla District	Dhaka University		
1986	Dhaka District	Comilla District		
1987–1988	Not Held			
1989	Bangladesh Army	Dhaka University		
1990	Dhaka University	Bangladesh Army		
1991	Not Held			
1992	Dhaka University	Khulna District		
1993	Khulna District	Feni District		
1994	Bhola District	Dhaka University		
1995	Not Held			
1996	Dhaka University	Narayanganj District		
1997–1999	Not Held			
2000	Noakhali District	Bangladesh Army		
2001–2003	Not Held			
2004	Narayanganj District	Bangladesh Army	(Bangladesh) Nasiruddin Chowdhury	5
2005	Not Held			
2006	Narayanganj District	Dhaka District		
2007–2019	Not Held			
2020	Bangladesh Army	Bangladesh Navy		
2021–22	Bangladesh Army	Chittagong District	(Bangladesh) Emtiyaz Raihan	6
