= Sumon Reza =

Bangladeshi footballer

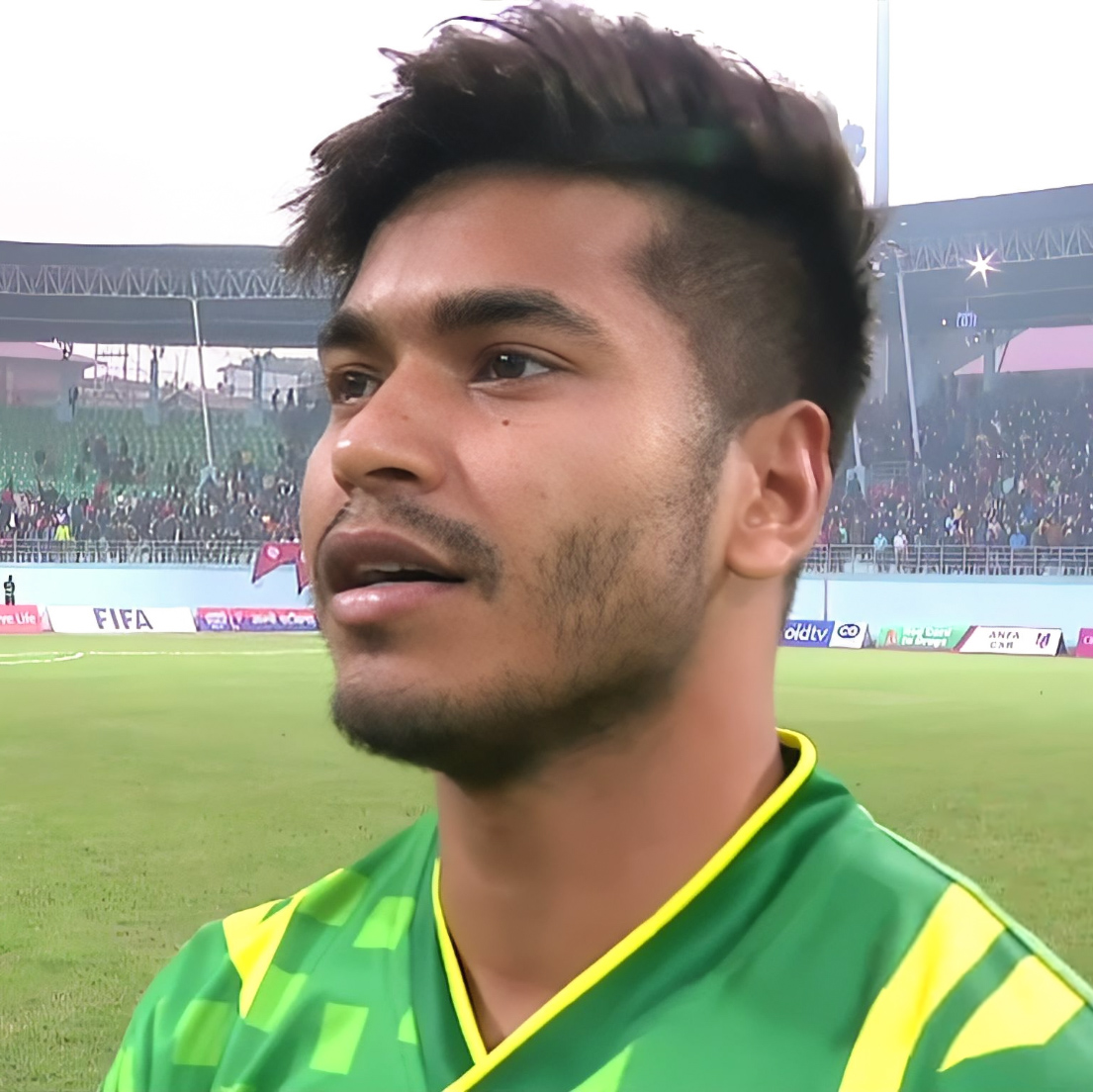
- Sumon with Bangladesh in 2021

Personal information
- Full name: Sumon Reza
- Date of birth: 15 June 1995 (age 31)
- Place of birth: Tangail, Bangladesh
- Position: Striker

Team information
- Current team: Chattogram City
- Number: 20

Senior career*
Years	Team	Apps	(Gls)
2015–	Bangladesh Air Force	0	(0)
2015–2021	Uttar Baridhara Club	53	(18)
2021–2023	Bashundhara Kings	28	(4)
2023–2024	Sheikh Russel KC	18	(3)
2024–2025	Dhaka Abahani	9	(3)
2025–2026	Mohammedan	4	(0)
2026–	Chattogram City	1	(0)

International career
2023	Bangladesh U23 (OA)	3	(0)
2020–2026	Bangladesh	29	(1)
- * Club domestic league appearances and goals as of 5 October 2026

Sumon Reza (Bengali: সুমন রেজা) is a Bangladeshi professional footballer who plays as a striker for Bangladesh Football League club Chattogram City. He also works in the Bangladesh Air Force.

== Club career ==
=== Bangladesh Air Force ===
In 2014, Sumon gave trial for Bangladesh Air Force football team in his own college ground. He got selected and started his professional career as a footballer. He also got job as a soldier in Bangladesh Air Force. He became popular in inter-services football tournaments. Even after signing for a professional league club, Sumon is obligated to represent the Bangladesh Air Force in the Independence Cup.

=== Uttar Baridhara ===
Sumon joined Uttar Baridhara Club in 2015 ahead of second phase of 2015–16 Bangladesh Premier League. Jahangir Alam, a Uttar Baridhara club official, scouted Sumon from inter-services tournament while he was playing for Air Force football team. He played 5 matches in his first BPL season, mostly as substitute as, Uttar Baridhara were relegated.

Sumon missed the next season due to a long-term injury. After recovery, he rejoined Uttar Baridhara to play in the 2018–19 Bangladesh Championship League. He also got captaincy of the team and helped them return to the Premier League scoring 8 goals, which includes a hat-trick.

=== Bashundhara Kings ===
On 25 November 2021, Sumon joined defending league champions Bashundhara Kings.

=== Mohammedan ===
He joined Mohammedan in 2025.

=== Chattogram City ===
Sumon joined Chattogram City for the 2026–27 Bangladesh Football League season.

== International career ==
In July 2020, Sumon earned his first-ever national call by Jamie Day.

On 13 November 2020, Sumon made his senior debut against Nepal in an international friendly.

In September 2022, Sumon decided to quit his job in the Bangladesh Air Force, after not receiving clearance to join the national team for a friendly match against Cambodia. Eventually, Sumon did not quit after the Air Force officials agreed to let the striker join the team.

== Career statistics ==
=== Club ===
As of 16 August 2023.

Appearances and goals by club, season and competition
Club	Season	League			Domestic Cup (Note: Appearance(s) in Bangladesh Federation Cup)		Other (Note: Appearance(s) in Bangladesh Independence Cup)		Continental		Total	
Club	Season	Division	Apps	Goals	Apps	Goals	Apps	Goals	Apps	Goals	Apps	Goals
Uttar Baridhara Club	2015–16	Bangladesh Premier League	5	0	0	0	0	0	—		5	0
Uttar Baridhara Club	2017	Bangladesh Championship League	0	0	—		—		—		0	0
Uttar Baridhara Club	2018–19	Bangladesh Championship League	20	8	—		—		—		20	8
Uttar Baridhara Club	2019–20	Bangladesh Premier League	5	0	1	0	—		—		6	0
Uttar Baridhara Club	2020–21	Bangladesh Premier League	23	10	4	2	—		—		27	12
Uttar Baridhara Club	Uttar Baridhara Club total		53	18	5	2	0	0	0	0	58	20
Bashundhara Kings	2021–22	Bangladesh Premier League	16	4	0	0	3 (Note: Appearance(s) with the Bangladesh Air Force)	0	1 (Note: Appearance(s) in AFC Cup)	0	17	4
Bashundhara Kings	2022–23	Bangladesh Premier League	12	0	4	1	4	4	—		16	1
Bashundhara Kings	Badhundhara Kings total		28	4	4	1	—		1	0	33	5
Sheikh Russel KC	2023–24	Bangladesh Premier League	0	0	0	0	0	0	—		0	0
Career total			81	22	9	3	7	4	1	0	98	29

=== International ===
As of 26 March 2026.

Bangladesh national team
Year	Apps	Goals
2020	3	0
2021	13	1
2022	4	0
2023	6	0
2024	1	0
2025	1	0
2026	1	0
Total	29	1

=== International goals ===
Scores and results list Bangladesh's goal tally first.

List of international goals scored by Sumon Reza
No.	Date	Venue	Opponent	Score	Result	Competition
1.	13 October 2021	National Football Stadium, Male	Nepal	1–0	1–1	2021 SAFF Championship

== Honours ==
Bashundhara Kings

- Bangladesh Premier League: 2021-22, 2022-23
- Federation Cup third place: 2022–23
