= Bangladesh Army football team =

Bangladesh Army FT
- Full name: Bangladesh Army Football Team
- Short name: BAF
- Founded: 1973; 53 years ago
- Ground: Bangladesh Army Stadium
- Capacity: 20,000
- Owner: Bangladesh Army
- League: National Football Championship
| Home colours | Away colours |

Bangladesh Army Football Team (Bengali: বাংলাদেশ সেনাবাহিনী ফুটবল দল) represents the Bangladesh Army in football and competes in the National Football Championship, which is the main district tournament in the country. They also participate in the Independence Cup and previously played in the Federation Cup.

The Army team consists of players who play professionally in the Bangladesh Football League, Championship League, Dhaka League and its lower tiers, while still being employed in the Bangladesh Army.

== History ==
Officially formed in 1973, only two years after the Independence of Bangladesh, Bangladesh Army football team was home to many domestic footballers shortly after. Hafizuddin Ahmed, who was only the second East Pakistani footballer to captain the Pakistan national team, was one of the first commissioned officers of the Bangladesh Army.

According to RSSSF, the earliest records of the Army taking part in a football competition was at the 1977/78 edition of the Aga Khan Gold Cup. During the tournament they suffered heavy defeats to Thai club Bangkok Bank (2–8) and Malaysia's Penang (1–4).

Kazi Mahmud Hasan, another East Pakistani player who represented the Pakistan national team, contributed significantly to Army's early success. He captained the team in 1973 and later served as their coach in 1980 and 1981.

They also regularly took part in the Sher-e-Bangla Cup, where they were joint winner alongside Dhaka University in both 1980 and 1981, while in 1989, they beat their rivals in the final to gain sole ownership of the title.

== Recent results ==
=== 2000s ===
Army started the new century by partaking in the ANFA Cup held in Nepal. Their subcontinental exploits were followed by disappointing results in the 2000 Federation Cup, where they finished at the bottom of their group. In the same year, they reached the Sher-e Bangla Cup final, losing to Noakhali in the final.

In 2001, Army qualified for the 2001–02 National Football League after defeating Bangladesh Navy in the Service Zone final. In the main tournament, Army produced one of the upsets of the year by defeating Dhaka Abahani by 2–1. Nonetheless, they failed to progress past the group-stage due to goal difference. In 2002, Army took part in the Federation Cup and finished third in their group. In 2004, Army enjoyed a relatively successful year, as they participated in the Federation Cup and also reached the final of the Sher-e Bangla Cup (losing to Narayanganj), as striker Nasiruddin Chowdhury lead the way with five goals.

The 2005–06 National Football League was the last time Army took part in the tournament, while top-tier clubs still competed in it. Their only win during the league came against Nobanabin Somabesh. They also partook in the 2005 edition of the Federation Cup, losing in the quarter-final to Sheikh Russel KC 2–5. The following decade, Army played in both the 2008 and 2009 editions of the Federation Cup, without finding much success.

=== 2010s ===
For the majority of the 2010s, the Army's football team remained inactive. The only notable tournament they took part in was Inter-Service football tournament, in 2018. In the final, Army defeated Bangladesh Navy 4–3, and midfielder Sohel Rana's performances during the tournament earned him a Bangladesh Premier League contract with Rahmatganj MFS. From 2014 till 2017, Army was trained by former national team captain, Alfaz Ahmed. The team also played friendlies against the Bangladesh olympic team, losing by narrow margins on multiple occasions. The rule changes also meant that Army members were now permitted to participate in the domestic football league with professional clubs.

=== 2020s ===
The start of the new decade saw the return of the Sher-e-Bangla Cup/National Football Championship (2020), as Army won the title for the fourth time. On 2 December 2021, Army stunned Mohammedan SC 2–1 in the 2021 Independence Cup, with goals from Ranju Sikdar and Shahriar Emon.

On 8 April 2022, Army won the 9th Bangabundhu Bangladesh Games beating Sylhet District 2–0.

On 4 July 2022, Army retained the National Championship (2021–22) title, defeating Chittagong District 4–2 in the final, with striker Imtiaz Raihan scoring twice in the final and remained the highest scorer of the tournament with six goals.

== Honours ==
=== Cups ===
- Sher-e-Bangla Cup/National Football Championship
  - Winners (5): 1980*, 1981*, 1989, 2020, 2021–22
  - Runner-up (2): 1982, 1989, 2000, 2004
- Inter-Service Football Tournament
  - Winners (1): 2018
- Bangladesh Games
  - Winners (1): 2020

== Notable players ==
The players below have senior international cap(s) for the Bangladesh national football team.

- Nasiruddin Chowdhury (1998–2008)
- Ashraful Islam Rana (2003–2023)
- Mehedi Hasan Mithu (2012–present)
- Mohamed Sohel Rana (2015–2018)
- Hasan Murad Tipu (2017–present)

== See also ==
- Bangladesh Navy football team
- Bangladesh Air Force football team
- Football in Bangladesh
