= 2020 Bangabandhu National Football Championship =

Tournament details
- Country: Bangladesh
- Dates: 17 January-March 2020
- Teams: 78

Final positions
- Champions: Bangladesh Army (1st title)
- Runners-up: Bangladesh Navy

Tournament statistics
- Matches played: 157
- Goals scored: 437 (2.78 per match)

The 2020 Bangabandhu National Football Championship, also known as 2020 Walton National Football Championship (due to sponsorship reason from Walton Group), is the 24th edition of the National Football Championship, the premier competition in Bangladesh for teams representing districts and government institutions. It is organized and hosted by the Bangladesh Football Federation. A total of 78 participants nation-wide will participate in the tournament.

Narayanganj District were the defending champions as they defeated Dhaka District 3–1 on penalties in the 2006 Jubok Phone National Championship (formerly Sher-e-Bangla Cup) on 3 September 2006.

== Format ==
Along with 63 districts football teams excluding only Kishoreganj, three service teams, six public universities, five education boards, and Bangladesh Krira Shikkha Protishthan will participate in the tournament. The participants districts have been divided in eight zones named Padma, Meghna, Jamuna, Shitalakshya, Brahmaputra, Surma, Chitra and Buriganga. Each zone consists eight teams except Surma, which contains seven teams. There will be knockout matches in every zone which will be played on home and away basis. In first round, a pair of teams of every zone will play each other which will decide four winners. In second round, that four winners in each zone will play zonal semifinal. In third round, the semi-final winners will face each other in zonal final. The champion from each zone will qualify for the final round.

Teams representing education boards, universities & the services teams—a total of 15 teams—are divided in four groups in Sheba zone. The teams of this zone will play on round-robin basis. Champion and runners-up of Sheba zone will join eight zonal champions in the final round.

== Championship round ==
In the championship round ten teams will contest: the eight winner teams from eight zones and two services teams.

== Qualified teams ==
- Bangladesh Army
- BKSP
- Comilla District
- Cox's Bazar District
- Khulna District
- Netrokona District
- Pabna District
- Rangpur District
- Satkhira District
- Sylhet District

== Sponsorship ==
The title sponsor of 2020 Bangabandhu National Football Championship is Walton Group.
