= Ganiu Ogungbe =

Nigerian footballer

Ganiu Atanda Ogungbe
Personal information
- Full name: Ganiu Atanda Ogungbe
- Date of birth: 1 December 1992 (age 33)
- Place of birth: Lagos, Nigeria
- Height: 1.91 m (6 ft 3 in)
- Positions: Centre back; defensive midfielder

Team information
- Current team: Odi Sports Club
- Number: 3

Youth career
- Kwara United

Senior career*
Years	Team	Apps	(Gls)
2013–2014	Omonia	10	(0)
2014–2016	Ethnikos Achnas	64	(10)
2016–2017	Enosis Neon	22	(2)
2017–2019	Busaiteen Club	40	(8)
2019–2020	Baf Ülkü Yurdu	22	(2)
2020	NK Krsko	4	(0)
2021–2022	Viljandi JK Tulevik	40	(3)
2022–2023	Pietà Hotspurs F.C.	19	(0)
2023–2024	Sheikh Russel KC	18	(3)
2025	Tartu JK Tammeka	30	(2)
2025–2026	Odi Sports Club	8	(3)

International career^{‡}
2009	Nigeria U17	10	(0)
2011–2012	Nigeria U20	20	(0)
Medal record
Representing Nigeria
U-20 Nigerian National team football
Africa U-20 Cup of Nations
Winner	2011 South Africa
- * Club domestic league appearances and goals as of 17 November 2025 ‡ National team caps and goals as of 31 March 2017

Ganiu Atanda Ogungbe (born 1 December 1992) is a Nigerian professional footballer who played last as a centre back or defensive midfielder for Odi Sports Club of Maldives Premier League.

== Club career ==
=== Trials in Netherlands ===
After U-20 World Cup Ogungbe was invited for a trial in Vitesse, Netherlands. He played a friendly game against AGOVV Apeldoorn and Vitesse was impressed with the player. Also at the time in Vitesse, Chelsea club who has great partnership with Vitesse was interested in the player and could have signed him but for financial reasons the deal did not go through.

=== Omonia ===
Ogungbe signed a three-year contract with Cyprus First Division team AC Omonia in summer 2013 after successful trial with the Cypriot team.

=== Ethnikos Achna ===
After contract renewal negotiations with AC Omonia did not succeed, Ogungbe signed a contract with Ethnikos Achna. In the 2014–15 season he scored five goals.

Ogungbe signed a new one-year contract with Ethnikos Achna in July 2015. For the second season Ogungbe managed to repeat the five goals of last season.

=== Enosis Neon ===
In August 2016, Ogungbe decided to sign with Enosis Neon Paralimni FC, whose manager Kostas Kaiafas was his coach also in AC Omonia.

=== Busaiteen Club ===
In August 2017, Ogungbe had signed with Busaiteen Club in Bahrain. The club finished third in the league, Ganiu Atanda Ogungbe played 15 games out of 16 games of the league and scored 5 goals.

After a good season with the Busaiteen Club, the management of the club had decided to sign him for another season, making Ogungbe the only foreign player in the team. Busaiteen Club won the league and Ganiu Atanda was one of the main players of the team scoring another five goals for the team.

=== Baf Ülkü Yurdu S.K. ===
After playing in Middle East, Ganiu Atanda Ogungbe was offered a contract in North Cyprus. The team finished the league 6th out of 16.

=== NK Krško ===
Atanda started playing 2020/21 season in Slovenia for NK Krško, however the Covid-19 stopped the season early.

=== Viljandi JK Tulevik ===
After training off seasons with Viljandi JK Tulevik for couple of years, the management of the team approached yet again Atanda to sign with Viljandi in February 2021 and the two parties agreed on terms. Atanda gave an assist on his first game of the season and was chosen to team of the week.

=== Pieta Hotspurs ===
Atanda signed with Maltese Premier league Pieta Hotspurs team summer 2022, played a big role in the team as a leader.

=== Sheikh Russel KC ===
In October 2023, Ganiu Atanda Ogungbe joined Sheikh Russel KC, premier league football club in Bangladesh. The move marked a new chapter in Ogungbe's career as he brought his skills and experience to the team. During the 2023-2024 season, he scored 3 goals in 18 league matches and earned 2 Man of the Match titles, showcasing his impact on the field and becoming an important player for the club.

=== Tartu Tammeka ===
In 2025, Ogungbe joined Estonian Meistriliiga club Tartu JK Tammeka. The experienced central defender became an important part of the team’s back line, providing defensive stability and leadership throughout the season. Ogungbe made regular appearances in the Meistriliiga and contributed to the team’s performances with his experience from previous spells abroad.

=== Odi Sports Club ===
In December 2025, Ogungbe joined Maldivian Premier League club Odi Sports Club. During the club’s debut season in the Dhivehi Premier League, he became a regular starter in defence, contributing with his experience and leadership. Ogungbe helped Odi Sports Club finish as runners-up in the 2025–26 Dhivehi Premier League and win the 2026 President’s Cup, the first major trophy in the club’s history, following a penalty shootout victory over Maziya in the final.

== International career ==
=== Youth ===
At the age of 17, Ogungbe was selected to Nigeria U-20 National team squad in 2010, in 2011 the Flying Eagles won 2011 African Youth Championship in South Africa and they qualified for the 2011 FIFA U-20 World Cup. Ogungbe played four games in 2011 FIFA U-20 World Cupin Colombia, against Guatemala, Croatia, England and France. Nigeria was knocked out of the competition in quarter finals, against France 3–2. when Alexandre Lacazette scored two and Gueïda Fofana added another goal on extra time.
