= Adama Jammeh (footballer) =

Gambian footballer

Personal information
- Full name: Adama Jammeh
- Date of birth: August 26, 2000 (age 26)
- Place of birth: Serekunda, Gambia
- Height: 1.89 m (6 ft 2 in)
- Position: Forward

Team information
- Current team: Rahmatganj MFS
- Number: 18

Senior career*
Years	Team	Apps	(Gls)
2016–2018	Armed Forces		
2018–2022	Étoile du Sahel	3	(0)
2022–2023	Falcons		
2023–2024	Casa Sports	2+	(2+)
2024–2025	Falcons		
2025–	Rahmatganj MFS	8	(1)

International career^{‡}
2017–2020	Gambia	4	(1)
- * Club domestic league appearances and goals as of 13 October 2019 ‡ National team caps and goals as of 13 October 2019

Adama Jammeh (born 26 August 2000) is a Gambian professional footballer who plays as a forward for Bangladesh Football League club Rahmatganj MFS.

== Professional career ==
On 7 September 2018, Jammeh signed a professional contract with Étoile du Sahel. He made his professional debut with Étoile du Sahel in a 4-1 Tunisian Ligue Professionnelle 1 win over Stade Tunisien on 9 January 2019.

== International career ==
Jammeh made his professional debut with the Gambia national football team in a 0-0 2018 African Nations Championship qualifying tie on 15 July 2017.
