= Bangladesh Navy football team =

Bangladesh Navy FT
- Full name: Bangladesh Navy Football Team
- Short name: BNFT
- Founded: 1971; 55 years ago
- Head coach: Md Mamun Mollah
- League: National Football Championship
Home colours	Away colours

Bangladesh Navy Football Team (Bengali: বাংলাদেশ নৌবাহিনী ফুটবল দল) represents the Bangladesh Navy in football and competes in the National Football Championship, which is the main national district tournament in the country. They also participate in the Independence Cup and previously played in the Federation Cup.

The Navy team consists of players who play professionally in the Bangladesh Football League, Championship League and semi-professionally in the Dhaka League and its lower tiers, while still being employed in the Bangladesh Navy.

== History ==
In May 2015, Navy hired six national team footballers, marking the first time in the history of Bangladesh that footballers from the national team had joined a services team.

== Notable players ==
The players below have senior international cap(s) for the Bangladesh national football team.

- Jewel Rana (2020–present)
- Shakhawat Hossain Rony (2020–present)
- Rahmat Mia (2020–present)
- Mamunul Islam (2015–present)
- Zahid Hasan Ameli (2015)
- Shakil Ahmed (2015–present)
- Shahidul Alam Sohel (2015–present)
- Mohamed Zahid Hossain (2015–present)

== Honours ==
- Inter-Service Football Tournament
  - Runners up (1): 2018
- National Football Championship
  - Runners Up (1): 2020

== See also ==
- Bangladesh Army football team
- Bangladesh Air Force football team
- Football in Bangladesh
