= Bangladesh Air Force football team =

Bangladesh Air Force FT
- Full name: Bangladesh Air Force Football Team
- Short name: BAFFT
- Founded: 1972; 54 years ago
- Owner: Bangladesh Air Force
- League: National Football Championship

The Bangladesh Air Force Football Team (Bengali: বাংলাদেশ বিমান বাহিনী ফুটবল দল) represents the Bangladesh Air Force in football and competes in the National Football Championship, which is the main district tournament in the country. They also participate in the Independence Cup and previously played in the Federation Cup.

The Air Force team consists of players who play professionally in the Bangladesh Football League, Championship League, Dhaka League and its lower tiers, while still being employed in the Bangladesh Air Force.

== Notable players ==
The players below have senior international cap(s) for the Bangladesh national football team.

- Sumon Reza (2020–present)

== See also ==
- Bangladesh Army football team
- Bangladesh Navy football team
- Football in Bangladesh
