= 2023–24 Bangladesh Police FC season =

Bangladesh Police FC
2023–24 season
- President: Habibur Rahman
- Head coach: Aristică Cioabă
- Stadium: Rafiq Uddin Bhuiyan Stadium
- Bangladesh Premier League: 4th of 10
- Federation Cup: Semi-finals
- Independence Cup: Quarter-finals
- Top goalscorer: League: Edis Ibargüen García; Edward Morillo (5 goals each); All: Edis Ibargüen García (9 goals)
- Biggest win: 3–0 Vs Sheikh Jamal DC (Neutral); 23 April 2024 (Federation Cup)
- Biggest defeat: 0–3 Vs Bashundhara Kings (Home); 10 February 2024 (Premier League)
Home colours	Away colours

The 2023–24 season was Bangladesh Police Football Club's 5th season in the top flight, Bangladesh Premier League. In addition to domestic league, Bangladesh Police FC were participated on this season's edition of Federation Cup and Independence Cup. The season covers the period from 1 August 2023 until 31 May 2024.

== Current squad ==
Bangladesh Police FC squad for 2023–24 season.

As of 23 October 2023

Note: Flags indicate national team as defined under FIFA eligibility rules; some limited exceptions apply. Players may hold more than one non-FIFA nationality.

No.	Pos.	Nation	Player
1	GK	BAN	Russel Mahmud Liton
2	DF	KGZ	Mustafa Yusupov
3	FW	BAN	Arifur Rahman Raju
4	DF	BAN	Mohammad Emon
5	DF	BAN	Rabiul Islam
6	MF	BAN	Monaem Khan Raju (vice-captain)
7	FW	BAN	M S Bablu
8	MF	BAN	Md Mithu
9	FW	BAN	Zillur Rahman
10	FW	BAN	Jabed Khan
11	FW	BAN	Sahed Miah
12	MF	COL	Mateo Palacios
14	FW	BAN	Faisal Ahmed
15	FW	BAN	Abu Sufian Sifat
16	MF	BAN	Noman Ahmed Rubel
17	DF	BAN	Isa Faysal (captain)
18	FW	COL	Edis Ibargüen García
19	FW	VEN	Edward Morillo

No.	Pos.	Nation	Player
20	FW	BAN	Miraz Molla
22	MF	KGZ	Manas Karipov
23	MF	BAN	Syed Shah Quazem Kirmane
24	GK	BAN	Md Faysal Mia
25	DF	BAN	Ismail Hossain
28	FW	BAN	Md Al Amin
31	GK	BAN	Dinaj Hosen Jubed
33	DF	BAN	Akibur Rahman
35	MF	BAN	Razuan Kabir
36	GK	BAN	Ahsan Habib Bipu
37	DF	BAN	Esanur Rahman
38	DF	BAN	Rasel Hossain
75	FW	BAN	Din Islam
76	FW	BAN	Md Robel
77	DF	BAN	Joyonto Kumer Roy
88	MF	BAN	Fahim Morshed
99	FW	BAN	Amir Ali

== Transfer ==
=== In ===
No.	Pos	Player	Previous club	Fee	Date	Source
18	FW	(Colombia) Edis Ibargüen	(Honduras) C.D. Marathón	Free	1 September 2023	
1	GK	Russel Mahmud Liton	Sheikh Jamal Dhanmondi	Free	1 October 2023	
36	GK	Ahsan Habib Bipu	Mohammedan SC	Free	1 October 2023	
20	MF	Maraj Mollah	Mohammedan SC	Free	1 October 2023	
10	FW	Jabed Khan	Fortis FC	Free	1 October 2023	
4	DF	Mohammad Emon	Sheikh Jamal Dhanmondi	Free	1 October 2023	
16	MF	Noman Ahmed Rubel	Unattached	Free	1 October 2023	
5	DF	Rabiul Islam	Unattached	Free	1 October 2023	
14	MF	Faisal Ahmed	Unattached	Free	1 October 2023	
75	FW	Din Islam	Unattached	Free	1 October 2023	
15	FW	Abu Sufian Yousuf Sifat	Unattached	Free	1 October 2023	
22	MF	(Kyrgyzstan) Manas Karipov	(Kyrgyzstan) Muras United	Free	18 October 2023	
2	DF	(Kyrgyzstan) Mustafa Yusupov	(Kyrgyzstan) Muras United	Free	18 October 2023	

=== Out ===
No.	Pos	Player	Moved to	Fee	Date	Source
21	DF	(Kyrgyzstan) Almazbek Malikov	(Kyrgyzstan) Muras United	Free transfer	28 July 2023	
14	MF	Mohammad Abdullah	Sheikh Jamal Dhanmondi	Free transfer	15 September 2023	
8	MF	Rabiul Hasan	Abahani Limited Dhaka	Free transfer	1 October 2023	
22	GK	Rakibul Hasan Tushar	Sheikh Russel KC	Free transfer	1 October 2023	
5	DF	Monjurur Rahman Manik	Sheikh Jamal Dhanmondi	Free transfer	1 October 2023	
16	FW	(Colombia) Johan Arango	Unattached	Released	1 October 2023	
32	GK	Mohammad Nehal	Unattached	Released	1 October 2023	
70	MF	Mohammad Afsaruzzaman Choton	Unattached	Released	1 October 2023	
75	FW	Morshed Islam	Unattached	Released	1 October 2023	
40	FW	Rashedul Islam Jihan	Unattached	Released	1 October 2023	
60	GK	Saiful Islam Khan	Unattached	Released	1 October 2023	
87	MF	Ashraful Chowdhury	Unattached	Released	1 October 2023	
29	FW	Akikul Islam	Unattached	Released	1 October 2023	
20	MF	Komol Barua	Unattached	Released	1 October 2023	
15	MF	Mohammed Shamim Ahmed	Unattached	Released	1 October 2023	
13	GK	Limon Islam Badhon	Unattached	Released	1 October 2023	
3	DF	Shamol Bepari	Unattached	Released	1 October 2023	
2	DF	(Uzbekistan) Solibek Korimov	Unattached	Released	1 October 2023	

== Competitions ==
Win Draw Loss Fixtures

=== Overall ===
Competition	First match	Last match	Final Position
BPL	22 December 2023	29 May 2024	4th
Federation Cup	26 December 2023	7 May 2024	Semi-finals
Independence Cup	27 October 2023	3 December 2023	Quarter-finals

=== Overview ===
Competition	Record							
Competition	Pld	W	D	L	GF	GA	GD	Win %
BPL	18	7	5	6	23	19	+4	38.89
Independence Cup	3	2	0	1	4	2	+2	66.67
Federation Cup	4	1	2	1	8	6	+2	25.00
Total	25	10	7	8	35	27	+8	40.00

Source: Competitions

=== Premier League ===
==== League table ====
Pos	Team	Pld	W	D	L	GF	GA	GD	Pts	Qualification or relegation
2	Mohammedan SC (Q)	18	9	8	1	40	17	+23	35	Qualification for the 2024 Bangladesh Challenge Cup (Note: being Bashundhara Kings Champions and winners of both league and 2023–24 Federation Cup, Mohammedan SC qualified for 2024 Bangladesh Challenge Cup after being runners-up in both league and cup.)
3	Abahani Ltd. Dhaka	18	9	5	4	34	22	+12	32	
4	Bangladesh Police FC	18	7	5	6	23	19	+4	26	
5	Fortis FC	18	6	6	6	21	23	−2	24	
6	Sheikh Russel KC	18	4	7	7	20	24	−4	19	

Source: Soccerway
Rules for classification: 1) Points; 2) Goal difference; 3) Goals scored.
(Q) Qualify for the phase indicated

==== Results summary ====
Overall								Home						Away					
Pld	W	D	L	GF	GA	GD	Pts	W	D	L	GF	GA	GD	W	D	L	GF	GA	GD
18	7	5	6	23	19	+4	26	4	0	5	11	11	0	3	5	1	12	8	+4

Source: Soccerway

==== Results by round ====
Round	1	2	3	4	5	6	7	8	9	10	11	12	13	14	15	16	17	18
Ground	H	H	A	H	A	H	H	A	A	A	A	H	A	H	A	A	H	H
Result	W	L	W	L	D	L	L	L	W	W	D	W	D	W	D	D	L	W
Position	2	4	3	4	3	4	7	9	7	5	5	6	4	4	4	4	4	4

Source: Matches
A = Away; H = Home; W = Win; D = Draw; L = Loss; P = Postponed

=== Matches ===
22 December 2023 1	Bangladesh Police FC	2–1	Chittagong Abahani	Mymensingh
14:30 BST (UTC+6)	Edis Ibargüen García 22', 43'; Syed Shah Quazem Kirmane (yellow card) 56'	Report	Imran Hassan Remon (yellow card) 45+9'	Stadium: Rafiq Uddin Bhuiyan Stadium; Referee: Md Jalal Uddin

30 December 2023 2	Bangladesh Police FC	0–1	Sheikh Jamal DC	Mymensingh
14:30 BST (UTC+6)	Faysal 55' (o.g.); Edis Ibargüen García (yellow card) 52'; Edward Morillo (yellow card) 85'	Report	Shokhrukhbek Kholmatov (yellow card) 44'; Akkas Ali (yellow card) 85'	Stadium: Rafiq Uddin Bhuiyan Stadium; Referee: Bituraj Barua

13 January 2024 3	Sheikh Russel KC	0–1	Bangladesh Police FC	Dhaka
14:45 BST (UTC+6)	Shahin (yellow card) 75'	Report	Manas Karipov (yellow card) 18'; Edis Ibargüen García (yellow card) 53'; Edward Morillo 65'	Stadium: Bashundhara Kings Arena; Referee: Bituraj Barua

20 January 2024 4	Bangladesh Police FC	2–3	Mohammedan SC	Mymensingh
14:45 BST (UTC+6)	Mateo Palacio 34'; Edward Morillo (yellow card) 45+3'; Sahed Miah 84'	Report	Ashraful Haque Asif (yellow card) 3'; Jafar 27'; Muzaffarov 70'; Diabate 78'	Stadium: Rafiq Uddin Bhuiyan Stadium; Referee: Md Alamgir Sarker

27 January 2024 5	Rahmatganj MFS	0–0	Bangladesh Police FC	Munshigonj
14:45 BST (UTC+6)	Samuel Mensah Konney (yellow card) 17'; Md Rokey (yellow card) 33'; Md Al Amin (yellow card) 72'; Ceesay (yellow card) 77'	Report	Emon (yellow card) 58'; Mateo Palacios (yellow card) 66'	Stadium: Shaheed Bir Sreshtho Flight Lieutenant Matiur Rahman Stadium; Referee: Bituraj Barua

2 February 2024 6	Bangladesh Police FC	1–2	Abahani Limited Dhaka	Mymensingh
15:00 BST (UTC+6)	Manas Karipov (yellow card) 53'; Ismail Hossain (yellow card) 58'; Bablu 65' (o.g.)	Report	Fernandes 12'; Mehedi (yellow card) 30'; Ridoy 51'; Soleimani (yellow card) 87'	Stadium: Rafiq Uddin Bhuiyan Stadium; Referee: Md Mizanur Rahman

10 February 2024 7	Bangladesh Police FC	0–3	Bashundhara Kings	Mymensingh
15:00 BST (UTC+6)	Ismail Hossain (yellow card) 88'	Report	Figueira 7'; Rakib 21'; Robinho (yellow card) 35'; Asror Gafurov 28'	Stadium: Rafiq Uddin Bhuiyan Stadium; Referee: Md Nasir Uddin

16 February 2024 8	Fortis FC	2–1	Bangladesh Police FC	Rajshahi
15:00 BST (UTC+6)	Abdullah Omar (yellow card) 45+1'; Pa Omar 51'; Mazharul Islam Sourav (yellow card) 61'; Gryshyn 90+4'	Report	Edward Morillo 80'	Stadium: Muktijuddho Sriti Stadium; Referee: Md Nasir Uddin

24 February 2024 9	Brothers Union	1–4	Bangladesh Police FC	Rajshahi
15:00 BST (UTC+6)	Md Rabby Hossen Rahul 43'; Md Insan Hossain (yellow card) 73'; Sufil (penalty missed) 90+2'	Report	Kirmane 45+2'; Edis Ibargüen García 52', 72', 79'; Md Mithu (yellow card) 75' (yellow-red card) 87'	Stadium: Muktijuddho Sriti Stadium; Referee: Mahmud Zamal Farouqee Nahid

29 March 2024 10	Chittagong Abahani	0–1	Bangladesh Police FC	Munshigonj
15:15 BST (UTC+6)	Rabby (yellow card) 59'; Ojukwu (yellow card) 90'; Paul Komolafe (yellow card) 90+5'	Report	Joyonto Kumar Roy (yellow card) 51'; Md Al Amin 79'	Stadium: Shaheed Bir Sreshtho Flight Lieutenant Matiur Rahman Stadium; Referee: Saymoon Hasan Sany

6 April 2024 11	Sheikh Jamal DC	2–2	Bangladesh Police FC	Gopalganj
15:15 BST (UTC+6)	Shokhrukhbek Kholmatov (yellow card) 38'; Touré 44', 60'	Report	Edward Morillo 11'; Mateo Palacios (yellow card) 50'; Md Al Amin 75'	Stadium: Sheikh Fazlul Haque Mani Stadium; Referee: Mizanur Rahman

19 April 2024 12	Bangladesh Police FC	1–0	Sheikh Russel KC	Mymensingh
15:45 BST (UTC+6)	Kirmane 26'; Zillur Rahman (yellow card) 51' (yellow-red card) 58'; Sokhibov (yellow card) 75'; Ahsan (yellow card) 80'	Report		Stadium: Rafiq Uddin Bhuiyan Stadium; Referee: Md Nasir Uddin

27 April 2024 13	Mohammedan SC	0–0	Bangladesh Police FC	Mymensingh
15:45 BST (UTC+6)	Manik (yellow card) 42'; Diabate (yellow card) 87'; Tipu (yellow card) 90+4'	Report		Stadium: Rafiq Uddin Bhuiyan Stadium; Referee: Bituraj Barua

4 May 2024 14	Bangladesh Police FC	2–0	Rahmatganj MFS	Mymensingh
15:45 BST (UTC+6)	Sahed Hosaain Miah 72'; Edward Morillo 83'; Sokhibov (yellow card) 86'; Emon (yellow card) 90+1'	Report	Iskandar Siddikzhonov (yellow card) 45'	Stadium: Rafiq Uddin Bhuiyan Stadium; Referee: Bituraj Barua

10 May 2024 15	Abahani Limited Dhaka	1–1	Bangladesh Police FC	Gopalganj
16:00 BST (UTC+6)	Stewart 8'; Washington (yellow card) 68'	Report	Bablu 87'	Stadium: Sheikh Fazlul Haque Mani Stadium; Referee: Md Jalaluddin

17 May 2024 16	Bashundhara Kings	2–2	Bangladesh Police FC	Dhaka
17:45 BST (UTC+6)	Udoh 43'; Dori 71'	Report	Mahdi Yusuf Khan 50'; Edward Morillo 69'; Faysal (yellow card) 90+5'	Stadium: Bashundhara Kings Arena; Referee: Golam Mourshed Chowdhury Nayon

24 May 2024 17	Bangladesh Police FC	1–2	Fortis FC	Mymensingh
16:00 BST (UTC+6)	Edward Morillo (yellow card) 36'; Mateo Palacios 90+3' (pen.)	Report	Omar 22' (yellow card) 31'; Gryshyn 58'	Stadium: Rafiq Uddin Bhuiyan Stadium; Referee: Md Mizanur Rahman

29 May 2024 18	Bangladesh Police FC	2–0	Brothers Union	Mymensingh
16:00 BST (UTC+6)	Abdullaev Azamat 32'; Ismail Hossain (yellow card) 36'; Sokhibov (yellow card) 43'; Din Islam 48'	Report		Stadium: Rafiq Uddin Bhuiyan Stadium; Referee: SM Jashim Akhter

=== Independence Cup ===
==== Group stages ====
Pos	Team	Pld	W	D	L	GF	GA	GD	Pts	Qualification
1	Bangladesh Police FC	2	2	0	0	3	0	+3	6	Advance to Knockout stage
2	Sheikh Jamal DC	2	1	0	1	4	1	+3	3	Advance to Knockout stage
3	Brothers Union	2	0	0	2	0	6	−6	0	

Source: GSA
Rules for classification: Group stage tiebreakers

27 October 2023	Bangladesh Police FC	2–0	Brothers Union	Munshiganj
14:30 BST (UTC+6)	Manas Karipov 23'; Edis Ibargüen García 67'	Report		Stadium: Shaheed Bir Sreshtho Flight Lieutenant Matiur Rahman Stadium; Referee: Saymoon Hasan Sany

2 November 2023	Sheikh Jamal DC	0–1	Bangladesh Police FC	Dhaka
14:30 BST (UTC+6)		Report	Manas Karipov 26'	Stadium: Bashundhara Kings Arena; Referee: Md Jalal Uddin

==== Knockout stages ====
3 December 2023 Quarter-finals	Bangladesh Police FC	1–2	Rahmatganj MFS	Dhaka
14:30 BST (UTC+6)	Edis Ibargüen García (pen.), 23'	Report	Samuel Mensah Konney 29', 31'	Stadium: Bashundhara Kings Arena; Referee: Md Jalal Uddin

=== Federation Cup ===
==== Group stages ====
Pos	Team	Pld	W	D	L	GF	GA	GD	Pts	Qualification
1	Sheikh Jamal DC	2	1	1	0	6	3	+3	4	Advance to Knockout stage
2	Bangladesh Police FC	2	0	2	0	4	4	0	2	Advance to Knockout stage
3	Rahmatganj MFS	2	0	1	1	3	6	−3	1	Qualified as a best third place team to Knockout stage

Source: Soccerway
Rules for classification: Group stages tiebreakers

26 December 2023	Rahmatganj MFS	2–2	Bangladesh Police FC	Munshigonj
14:00 BST (UTC+6)	Samuel Mensah Konney 41'; Boateng 77' (pen.)	Report	Sahed Miah 19'; Edis Ibargüen García 68' (pen.)	Stadium: Shaheed Bir Sreshtho Flight Lieutenant Matiur Rahman Stadium; Referee: Md Mizanur Rahman

6 February 2024	Sheikh Jamal DC	2–2	Bangladesh Police FC	Gopalganj
15:00 BST (UTC+6)	Abdullah 23'; Dimgba 39' (pen.)	Report	Edis Ibargüen García 25'; Kirmane 31'	Stadium: Sheikh Fazlul Haque Mani Stadium; Referee: Md Nasiruddin

==== Knockout stages ====
23 April 2024 Quarter-finals	Sheikh Jamal DC	0–3	Bangladesh Police FC	Gopalganj
15:00 BST (UTC+6)	Fahad (yellow card) 14'; Touré (yellow card) 45+4'	Report	Sokhibov 2'; Kirmane 8'; Abdullaev Azamat 23'; Ismail Hossain (yellow card) 28'	Stadium: Sheikh Fazlul Haque Mani Stadium; Referee: Md Jalal Uddin

7 May 2024 Semi-finals	Mohammedan SC	2–1	Bangladesh Police FC	Munshigonj
15:00 BST (UTC+6)	Emmanuel 68'; Emon 79'	Report	Akhrorbek Uktamov 47'	Stadium: Shaheed Bir Sreshtho Flight Lieutenant Matiur Rahman Stadium; Referee: Saymoon Hasan Sany

== Statistics ==
=== Goalscorers ===
As of 29 May 2024

Rank	Player	Position	Total	BPL	Independence Cup	Federation Cup
1	(Colombia) Edis Ibargüen García	FW	9	5	2	2
2	(Venezuela) Edward Morillo	FW	5	5	0	0
3	(Bangladesh) Syed Shah Quazem Kirmane	MF	4	2	0	2
4	(Bangladesh) Sahed Miah	FW	3	2	0	1
5	(Bangladesh) Md Al Amin	FW	2	2	0	0
5	(Colombia) Mateo Palacios	MF	2	2	0	0
5	(Kyrgyzstan) Manas Karipov	MF	2	0	2	0
5	(Uzbekistan) Abdullaev Azamat	DF	2	1	0	1
6	(Bangladesh) M S Bablu	FW	1	1	0	0
6	(Bangladesh) Mahdi Yusuf Khan	MF	1	1	0	0
6	(Uzbekistan) Javokhir Sokhibov	MF	1	0	0	1
6	(Bangladesh) Din Islam	FW	1	1	0	0
6	(Uzbekistan) Uktamov Akhrorbek	DF	1	0	0	1
Own goal			1	1	0	0
Total			35	23	4	8
