= 2024–25 Bangladesh Police FC season =

Bangladesh Police FC
2024–25 season
- President: Habibur Rahman
- Head coach: Md Mahbubul Haque Jowel
- Stadium: Rafiq Uddin Bhuiyan Stadium
- Bangladesh Premier League: 7th of 10
- Federation Cup: Group stage
- Independence Cup: Did not held
- Top goalscorer: League: Al-Amin (8 goals); All: Al-Amin (10 goals)
- Biggest win: 4–1 Vs Fakirerpool Young Men's Club (Home); 7 December 2024 (Premier League)
- Biggest defeat: 0–5 Vs Bashundhara Kings (Home); 3 January 2025 (Premier League)
Home colours	Away colours

The 2024–25 season was Bangladesh Police Football Club's 6th season in the top flight, Bangladesh Premier League. In addition to domestic league, Bangladesh Police FC were participated on this season's edition of Federation Cup and Independence Cup. The season covered period from 1 June 2024 until 27 May 2025.

== Transfer ==
=== In ===
No.	Pos	Player	Previous club	Fee	Date	Source
24	FW	Dipok Roy	Sheikh Russel KC	Free	1 June 2024	
20	FW	Jahedul Alam	Chittagong Abahani	Free	18 June 2024	
14	MF	Manik Hossain Molla	Mohammedan SC	Free	19 June 2024	
10	MF	Hemanta Vincent Biswas	Chittagong Abahani	Free	3 July 2024	
11	FW	Mannaf Rabby	Chittagong Abahani	Free	3 July 2024	
18	MF	Jayed Ahmed	Sheikh Jamal DC	Free	3 July 2024	
5	DF	(Paraguay) Alexander Moreno	(Saudi Arabia) Al-Thoqbah Club	Free	1 August 2024	
9	FW	(Paraguay) Tobias Quintana	(Paraguay) 12 de Octubre	Free	19 August 2024	
55	FW	Mohammed Al-Amin	Sheikh Jamal DC	Free	21 August 2024	
1	GK	Rakibul Islam Tushar	Sheikh Russel KC	Free	21 August 2024	
36	GK	Shohanur Rahman	BFF Elite Academy	Free	22 August 2024	
6	MF	Abu Shaeid	Sheikh Jamal DC	Free	22 August 2024	
8	MF	Md Anik Hossain	Chittagong Abahani	Free	22 August 2024	
3	DF	Mohammad Sagor Miah	Sheikh Russel KC	Free	22 August 2024	
22	GK	Md Nayeem Mia	Sheikh Russel KC	Free	22 August 2024	
25	DF	Bayazi Mustofa	Swadhinata KS	Free	22 August 2024	
29	DF	Asadul Islam Sakib	Chittagong Abahani	Free	22 August 2024	
4	DF	Md Tarek	Rahmatganj MFS	Free	22 August 2024	
	FW	(Paraguay) Luis Ibarra	(Paraguay) Club Atlético 3 de Febrero	Free	5 February 2025	
	DF	(Brazil) Danilo Quipapá	(India) Delhi FC	Free	11 February 2025	
	MF	(Uzbekistan) Jahongir Qurbonboyev	(Uzbekistan) PFC Kumkurgan-1977	Free	12 February 2025	

=== Out ===
No.	Pos	Player	Moved to	Fee	Date	Source
71	MF	Mahdi Yusuf Khan	Abahani Limited Dhaka	Free	6 June 2024	
19	FW	(Venezuela) Edward Murillo	(Nicaragua) Managua FC	Free	29 June 2024	
4	DF	Mohammad Emon	Dhaka Wanderers Club	Free	17 July 2024	
	MF	Md Mithu	Dhaka Wanderers Club	Free	27 July 2024	
	DF	Khalekurzaman Sabuj	Dhaka Wanderers Club	Free	27 July 2024	
	FW	Saief Shamsud	Dhaka Wanderers Club	Free	30 July 2024	
	DF	(Uzbekistan) Azamat Abdullaev	(Indonesia) Gresik United F.C.	Free	8 August 2024	
	DF	Miraz Molla	Dhaka Wanderers Club	Free	14 August 2024	
	MF	(Uzbekistan) Javokhir Sokhibov		Released	19 August 2024	
	MF	(Uzbekistan) Akhrorbek Uktamov		Released	19 August 2024	
	MF	Sahed Mia	Dhaka Wanderers Club	Free	21 August 2024	
8	MF	Monaem Khan Raju	Brothers Union	Free	21 August 2024	
30	GK	Ahsan Habib Bipu	Rahmatganj MFS	Free	22 August 2024	
24	FW	Said Rakib Khan	Brothers Union	Free	22 August 2024	
	MF	(Colombia) Mateo Palacio	(Indonesia) Persipa Pati	Free	26 August 2024	

== Competitions ==
Win Draw Loss Fixtures

=== Overall ===
Competition	First match	Last match	Final Position
BPL	29 November 2024	27 May 2025	6th
Federation Cup	3 December 2024	28 January 2025	Group stage
Independence Cup	Did not held		

=== Overview ===
Competition	Record							
Competition	Pld	W	D	L	GF	GA	GD	Win %
BPL	18	8	3	7	24	25	−1	44.44
Independence Cup; Did not held	0	0	0	0	0	0	+0	—
Federation Cup	4	1	2	1	4	4	+0	25.00
Total	22	9	5	8	28	29	−1	40.91

Source: Competitions

=== Premier League ===
==== League table ====
Pos	Team	Pld	W	D	L	GF	GA	GD	Pts	Qualification or relegation
5	Brothers Union	18	7	6	5	28	18	+10	27	
6	Fortis	18	6	9	3	24	15	+9	27	
7	Bangladesh Police	18	8	3	7	23	24	−1	27	
8	Fakirerpool	18	6	1	11	23	54	−31	19	
9	Dhaka Wanderers (R)	18	3	1	14	14	55	−41	10	Relegation to BCL

Source: Soccerway
Rules for classification: 1) Points; 2) Goal difference; 3) Goals scored.
(R) Relegated

==== Results summary ====
Overall								Home						Away					
Pld	W	D	L	GF	GA	GD	Pts	W	D	L	GF	GA	GD	W	D	L	GF	GA	GD
18	8	3	7	24	26	−2	27	5	2	2	12	13	−1	3	1	5	12	13	−1

Source: Soccerway

==== Results by round ====
Round	1	2	3	4	5	6	7	8	9	10	11	12	13	14	15	16	17	18
Ground	A	H	A	H	A	H	H	A	H	H	A	H	A	H	A	A	H	A
Result	L	W	W	L	L	L	D	L	W	W	W	W	L	D	W	D	W	L
Position	6	6	4	6	5	7	7	7	7	7	6	5	5	6	6	6	6	6

Source: Matches
A = Away; H = Home; W = Win; D = Draw; L = Loss; P = Postponed

=== Matches ===
29 November 2024 1	Brothers Union	2–1	Bangladesh Police FC	Munshiganj
14:30 BST	Maxi Cessay 23'; Zakaria Darboe 62'	Report	Manik 44'	Stadium: Shaheed Bir Sreshtho Flight Lieutenant Matiur Rahman Stadium; Referee: Md Saymoon Hasan Sany

7 December 2024 2	Bangladesh Police FC	4–1	Fakirerpool YMC	Mymensingh
14:30 BST	Tobias Quintana (yellow card) 40'; Joyonto Kumer Roy 45'; Manik 52'; Al Amin 65', 81'	Report	Turaev 9'; Solibek Karimov (yellow card) 85'	Stadium: Rafiq Uddin Bhuiyan Stadium; Referee: Jasim Akhter

14 December 2024 3	Dhaka Wanderers Club	0–4	Bangladesh Police FC	Gazipur
14:30 BST	Shahidul Islam Sumon (yellow card) 19'; Rasel 71'	Report	Al Amin 36', 41'; Dipok 79'; Kirmane 82'	Stadium: Shaheed Barkat Stadium; Referee: Md Alamgir Sarker

20 December 2024 4	Bangladesh Police FC	1–3	Mohammedan SC (Dhaka)	Mymensingh
14:30 BST	Manik (yellow card) 10'; Al-Amin 45+2' (yellow card) 56'; Joyonto Kumar Roy (yellow card) 76'; Rabby (yellow card) 90'	Report	Rafiq (yellow card) 17'; Agbaji 31'; Emmanuel 40' (yellow card) 90'; Diabate 71'; Asif (yellow card) 89'	Stadium: Rafiq Uddin Bhuiyan Stadium; Referee: Md Nasiruddin

28 December 2024 5	Abahani Limited Dhaka	2–0	Bangladesh Police FC	Cumilla
14:30 BST	A. Akash 23'; Y. Khan (yellow card) 41'; S. Hossain (yellow card) 56'; M. Marma (yellow card) 81'; S. Emon 88'	Report	M. Al-Amin (yellow card) 90+1'	Stadium: Shaheed Dhirendranath Datta Stadium; Referee: Md Nasir Uddun

3 January 2025 6	Bangladesh Police FC	0–5	Bashundhara Kings	Mymensingh
14:45 BST	Morshedul Islam (yellow card) 44'; Alexander Moreno (red card) 85'; J. Ahmed (yellow card) 90+3'	Report	F. Fahim (yellow card) 3'; J. Fernandes 10', 38' (yellow card) 90+4'; M. Jony 13' (yellow card) 52'; R. Hossain 50'; T. Barman (yellow card) 73'; Isaiah Ejeh (yellow card) 74'; M. Figueira (yellow card) 89' (goal) 90+5'	Stadium: Rafiq Uddin Bhuiyan Stadium; Referee: Saymoon Hasan Sany

11 January 2025 7	Bangladesh Police FC	1–1	Fortis FC	Mymensingh
14:45 BST	I. Faysal (yellow card) 12'; A. Shaeid (yellow card) 62'; Morshedul Islam 90+2'	Report	M. Manik (red card) 54'; P. Nova 90+3'	Stadium: Rafiq Uddin Bhuiyan Stadium; Referee: Md Jalal Uddin

17 January 2025 8	Chittagong Abahani	1–0	Bangladesh Police FC	Mymensingh
14:45 BST	Diamond Kwasi (yellow card) 14'; Mohammed Fahim Morshed 55'; Mohammed Sagor Sarkar (yellow card) 89'	Report	M. Rabby (yellow card) 55'	Stadium: Rafiq Uddin Bhuiyan Stadium; Referee: Md Jalal Uddin

24 January 2025 9	Bangladesh Police FC	2–1	Rahmatganj MFS	Mymensingh
14:45 BST (UTC+6)	M. Al-Amin 36', 68'	Report	M. Oshie 25'	Stadium: Rafiq Uddin Bhuiyan Stadium; Referee: Mahaud Zamal Farooque Nahid

21 February 2025 10	Bangladesh Police FC	1–0	Brothers Union	Mymensingh
15:00 BST (UTC+6)	D. Quipapá 4'; Md Anik Hossain (red card) 88'	Report	S. Tripura (yellow card) 72'	Stadium: Rafiq Uddin Bhuiyan Stadium; Referee: Md Alamgir Sarkar

11 April 2025 11	Fakirerpool YMC	0–3	Bangladesh Police FC	Gazipur
15:30 BST (UTC+6)		Report	M. S. Bablu 71', 85'; D. Roy 79'	Stadium: Shaheed Barkat Stadium; Referee: Md Jalal Uddin

25 April 2025 12	Bangladesh Police FC	1–0	Dhaka Wanderers Club	Mymensingh
15:30 BST (UTC+6)	Alexander Moreno (yellow card) 29'; Jahongir Qurbonboyev 84'	Report	N. Rasel (yellow card) 71'	Stadium: Rafiq Uddin Bhuiyan Stadium; Referee: Golam Mourshed Choudhury Nayon

2 May 2025 13	Mohammedan SC	3–1	Bangladesh Police FC	Cumilla
15:45 BST (UTC+6)	Shanto (yellow card) 31'; S. Emmanuel 52', 90+4'; M. Muzaffarov (yellow card) 64' (goal) 88' (pen.)	Report	M. Molla (yellow card) 42'; D. Quipapá 65' (pen.)	Stadium: Shaheed Dhirendranath Datta Stadium; Referee: Anisur Rahman Sagor

10 May 2025 14	Bangladesh Police FC	0–0	Abahani Limited Dhaka	Mymensingh
16:00 BST (UTC+6)	I. Faysal (yellow card) 45+4'; D. Roy (yellow card) 56'; Md Anik Hossain (yellow card) 80'; Ismail Hossain (yellow card) 85'; M. Rabby (yellow card) 90+5'	Report	Y. Khan (yellow card) 45+3'; P.Singh (yellow card) 50' (yellow-red card) 90+3'; S. Hossain (yellow card) 90+1'	Stadium: Mymensingh Zilla Stadium; Referee: Anisur Rahman Sagor

16 May 2025 15	Bashundhara Kings	0–1	Bangladesh Police FC	Dhaka
18:00 BST (UTC+6)	F. Fahim (yellow card) 70'	Report	S. Kirmane (yellow card) 10'; D. Roy 50'; Md Anik Hossain 71'	Stadium: Bashundhara Kings Arena; Referee: Mohamad Alamgir Sarkar

21 May 2025 16	Fortis FC	1–1	Bangladesh Police FC	Dhaka
16:00 BST (UTC+6)	Fahad (yellow card) 33'; Babou 67'	Report	Al-Amin 44'; Ismail Hossain (yellow card) 55'; Md Anik Hossain (yellow card) 64'; Alexander Moreno (yellow card) 87'	Stadium: Bashundhara Kings Arena; Referee: Mahmud Zamal Farouqee Nahid

24 May 2025 17	Bangladesh Police FC	2–1	Chittagong Abahani	Mymensingh
16:00 BST (UTC+6)	Al-Amin 11', 49'; Shaeid (yellow card) 36'	Report	Rabbi (yellow card) 60'; Sohanur Rahman Sohan (yellow card) 81'; Saiful Islam 84'	Stadium: Mymensingh Zilla Stadium; Referee: Bhubon Mohon Tarafder

27 May 2025 18	Rahmatganj MFS	4–1	Bangladesh Police FC	Munshigonj
16:00 BST (UTC+6)	Boateng 9', 54', 79'; Solomon King Kanform 31'; Taj (yellow card) 37'; Tanvir (yellow card) 59'	Report	Quipapá 3'; Luis Ibarra (yellow card) 39'; Md Anik Hossain (yellow card) 45+4'	Stadium: Shaheed Bir Sreshtho Flight Lieutenant Matiur Rahman Stadium; Referee: Bituraj Barua

=== Federation Cup ===
==== Group stages ====
Pos	Team	Pld	W	D	L	GF	GA	GD	Pts	Qualification
1	Bashundhara Kings	4	3	0	1	9	4	+5	9	Qualified for QRF 1
2	Brothers Union	4	2	1	1	9	1	+8	7	Advanced to QRF 2
3	Fortis	4	2	1	1	5	1	+4	7	
4	Bangladesh Police	4	1	2	1	4	4	0	5	
5	Dhaka Wanderers	4	0	0	4	1	18	−17	0	

Source: Soccerway
Rules for classification: Group stages tiebreakers

3 December 2024	Bangladesh Police FC	0–0	Fortis FC	Mymensingh
14:30 BST (UTC+6)		Report		Stadium: Rafiq Uddin Bhuiyan Stadium; Referee: Mahmud Zamal Farouqee Nahid

31 December 2024	Bangladesh Police FC	2–3	Bashundhara Kings	Dhaka
14:30 BST (UTC+6)	Al Amin 7', 54'	Report	Topu 6'; Miguel 10'; Fernandes 53'	Stadium: Bashundhara Kings Arena; Referee: Jasim Akhter

14 January 2025	Bangladesh Police FC	2–1	Dhaka Wanderers	Dhaka
14:30 BST (UTC+6)	M. Rabby 84'; Esanur Rahman 86'	Report	M. Emon 42' (pen.)	Stadium: Bashundhara Kings Arena; Referee: Anisur Rahman Sagor

28 January 2025	Bangladesh Police FC	0–0	Brothers Union	Mymensingh
14:45 BST (UTC+6)		Report		Stadium: Rafiq Uddin Bhuiyan Stadium; Referee: Bhubon Mohon Tarofder

== Statistics ==
=== Goalscorers ===
As of 27 May 2025

Rank	Player	Position	Total	BPL	Federation Cup
1	(Bangladesh) Al-Amin	FW	12	10	2
2	(Bangladesh) Dipok Roy	FW	3	3	0
2	(Brazil) Danilo Quipapá	DF	3	3	0
3	(Bangladesh) Manik Hossain Molla	MF	2	2	0
3	(Bangladesh) M. S. Bablu	MF	2	2	0
4	(Bangladesh) Joyonto Kumar Roy	DF	1	1	0
4	(Bangladesh) Syed Shah Quazem Kirmane	MF	1	1	0
4	(Bangladesh) Md Morshedul Islam	FW	1	1	0
4	(Bangladesh) Easnur Rahman	DF	1	0	1
4	(Bangladesh) Mannaf Rabby	FW	1	0	1
4	(Uzbekistan) Jakhongir Qurbonboyev	MF	1	1	0
Total			28	24	4
