= 2023–24 Bangladesh Premier League (football) =

16th professional season of the top-flight football league in Bangladesh

Bangladesh Premier League
- Season: 2023–24
- Dates: 22 December 2023 – 29 May 2024
- Champions: Bashundhara Kings (5th title)
- AFC Challenge League: Bashundhara Kings
- Matches: 90
- Goals: 263 (2.92 per match)
- Best player: Rakib Hossain
- Top goalscorer: Overall: Cornelius Stewart (19 goals); Local: Rakib Hossain (10 goals)
- Best goalkeeper: Ahsan Habib Bipu
- Biggest home win: Mohammedan SC 8–0 Brothers Union (20 April 2024)
- Biggest away win: Brothers Union 1–7 Bashundhara Kings (30 March 2024)
- Highest scoring: Brothers Union 1–7 Bashundhara Kings (30 March 2024) Mohammedan SC 8–0 Brothers Union (20 April 2024) Abahani Ltd. Dhaka 7–1 Brothers Union (17 May 2024)
- Longest winning run: 8 matches Bashundhara Kings
- Longest unbeaten run: 14 matches Mohammedan SC
- Longest winless run: 15 matches Brothers Union
- Longest losing run: 10 matches Brothers Union

The 2023–24 Bangladesh Premier League, also known as the ABG Bashundhara Bangladesh Premier League for sponsorship reasons, was the 16th season of the Bangladesh Premier League since its establishment in 2007. A total of 10 football clubs were competed in the league. The country's top-flight football competition was started on 22 December 2023 and ended on 29 May 2024.

The Bashundhara Kings are the defending champions, having won a record 5th consecutive title with previous season.

== Rule changes from last season ==
- The number of player registrations of participating teams is increased by 1 player from 35 players to 36 players.
- A club can sign maximum of six foreigners including at least one player who hails from an AFC affiliated nation. However, the AFC "3+1" foreign players rule (three players of any nationality and one from an AFC MA) will be in effect at any instant of a match.

== Teams ==
Ten teams will compete in the league – the top nine teams from the previous season and the two teams promoted from the Bangladesh Championship League. The promoted teams are Brothers Union and Gopalganj Sporting Club. Brothers will return to the top flight after an absence of two years, while Gopalganj will make their debut in the Premier League. They are replacing Muktijoddha Sangsad KC and AFC Uttara, who were relegated to the Bangladesh Championship League after respective spells of sixteen years and one year in the top flight. Muktijoddha suffered relegation for the first time since the inception of the Premier League in 2007. On the final day of the players' registration window, Gopalganj Sporting Club confirmed their withdrawal from the BPL due to the financial shortage. In May 2024, the BFF announced that there will be only one relegation this season as the league was kicked off with reduced participants after Gopalganj's withdrawal. On July 17, 2024, the BFF announced that there would be no relegations made from the league, allowing the previously relegated Brothers Union to retain their place in the league for the following season.

=== Changes ===
Promoted from 2022–23 BCL	Relegated from 2022–23 BPL
Brothers Union; ~~Gopalganj Sporting Club~~	Muktijoddha Sangsad KC; AFC Uttara

=== Stadiums and locations ===
Locations of the 2023–24 Bangladesh Premier League teams

Team	Location	Stadium	Capacity
Abahani Limited Dhaka	Gopalganj	Sheikh Fazlul Haque Mani Stadium	5,000
Bangladesh Police FC	Mymensingh	Rafiq Uddin Bhuiyan Stadium	25,000
Bashundhara Kings	Dhaka	Bashundhara Kings Arena	14,000
Chittagong Abahani	Munshigonj	Bir Fl. Lt. Matiur Rahman Stadium	10,000
Mohammedan SC	Mymensingh	Rafiq Uddin Bhuiyan Stadium	25,000
Fortis FC	Rajshahi	Muktijuddho Smriti Stadium	15,000
Brothers Union	Rajshahi	Muktijuddho Smriti Stadium	15,000
Rahmatganj MFS	Munshigonj	Bir Fl. Lt. Matiur Rahman Stadium	10,000
Sheikh Jamal DC	Gopalganj	Sheikh Fazlul Haque Mani Stadium	5,000
Sheikh Russel KC	Dhaka	Bashundhara Kings Arena	14,000

=== Personnel, kits, sponsors ===
Team	Head coach	Captain	Kit manufacturer	Shirt sponsor (chest)
Abahani Limited Dhaka	(Argentina) Andrés Cruciani	(Bangladesh) Rahmat Mia	BIRD	
Bangladesh Police FC	(Romania) Aristică Cioabă	(Bangladesh) Isa Faysal	Club Manufactured	
Bashundhara Kings	(Spain) Óscar Bruzón	(Brazil) Robinho	Club Manufactured	POCKET
Brothers Union	(Bangladesh) Azmol Hossain Biddyut	(Bangladesh) Eleta Kingsley	Club Manufactured	Biswas Builders Limited
Chittagong Abahani	(Bangladesh) Md. Tajuddin Taju	(Bangladesh) Yeasin Khan	Club Manufactured	Saif Powertec
Fortis FC	(Bangladesh) Masud Parvez Kaiser	(Bangladesh) Mazharul Islam Sourav	TORR	TORR Limited
Mohammedan SC	(Bangladesh) Alfaz Ahmed	(Mali) Souleymane Diabate	Sports Apparel Design	Max Group
Rahmatganj MFS	(Netherlands) Erol Akbay	(The Gambia) Dawda Ceesay	BIRD	
Sheikh Jamal DC	(Bangladesh) Zulfiker Mahmud Mintu	(Bangladesh) Atiqur Rahman Fahad	Club Manufactured	T Sports
Sheikh Russel KC	(North Macedonia) Jugoslav Trenchovski	(Bangladesh) Mitul Marma	Club Manufactured	Bashundhara Cement

=== Coaching changes ===
Team	Outgoing head coach	Manner of departure	Date of vacancy	Position in the table	Incoming head coach	Date of appointment
Brothers Union	(Bangladesh) Sheikh Zahidur Rahman Milon	Unknown	20 April 2023	Pre-season	(Bangladesh) Faisal Mahmud (caretaker)	October 2023
Sheikh Russel KC	(Bangladesh) Zulfiker Mahmud Mintu	Contract expired	August 2023	Pre-season	(North Macedonia) Jugoslav Trenchovski	19 August 2023
Sheikh Jamal DC	(Bangladesh) Maruful Haque	Contract expired	August 2023	Pre-season	(North Macedonia) Marjan Sekulovski	31 August 2023
Abahani Limited Dhaka	(Portugal) Mário Lemos	Contract expired	October 2023	Pre-season	(Argentina) Andrés Cruciani	13 October 2023
Rahmatganj MFS	(Bangladesh) Kamal Babu	Sacked	November 2023	Pre-season	(Bangladesh) Humayun Kabir (Interim)	22 November 2023
Rahmatganj MFS	(Bangladesh) Humayun Kabir (Interim)	Demoted to an assistant coach role	1 January 2024	7th	(Bangladesh) Sheikh Zahidur Rahman Milon	2 January 2024
Brothers Union	(Bangladesh) Faisal Mahmud (caretaker)	Demoted to an assistant coach role	10 January 2024	10th	(The Gambia) Omar Sisse	October 2023
Sheikh Jamal DC	(North Macedonia) Marjan Sekulovski	Resigned	30 January 2024	5th	(Bangladesh) Zulfiker Mahmud Mintu	30 January 2024
Brothers Union	(The Gambia) Omar Sisse	Demoted to an assistant coach role	31 January 2024	10th	(Bangladesh) Ali Asgar Nasir (Interim)	1 February 2024
Brothers Union	(Bangladesh) Ali Asgar Nasir (Interim)	Resigned	February 2024	10th	(Bangladesh) Azmol Hossain Biddyut	9 February 2024
Rahmatganj MFS	(Bangladesh) Sheikh Zahidur Rahman Milon	Demoted to an assistant coach role	22 March 2024	9th	(Netherlands) Erol Akbay	22 March 2024
Chittagong Abahani	(Bangladesh) Mahabubul Haque Juwel	Mutual consent	March 2024	8th	(Bangladesh) Md. Tajuddin Taju	25 March 2024

== Foreign players ==
Each team is allowed a maximum of six foreign players, including one player from any of the Asian Football Confederation countries. A team could name four foreign players on the squad of each game, including at least one player from the AFC confederation.

- Names in **bold** refer to players who have senior international cap(s) for their respective nations.
- Player's name in italics indicates the player was officially registered but later didn't join the club, has been out of the squad or left the club/released within the season, after the pre-season transfer window, or in the mid-season transfer window.

Club	Player 1	Player 2	Player 3	Player 4	Player 5	AFC player(s)	Left mid-season	Unregistered player(s)
Abahani Limited Dhaka	(Brazil) Bruno Gonçalves Rocha	(Brazil) Fernandes	(Brazil) Washington Brandão	**(Saint Vincent and the Grenadines) Cornelius Stewart**		(Iran) Milad Sheykh (Australia) Aaron Evans	**(Nigeria) Emeka Ogbugh**	
Bangladesh Police FC	(Venezuela) Edward Enrique Morillo	(Colombia) Mateo Palacios Pretel	(Panama) Leonel Enrique Tejada			(Uzbekistan) **Javokhir Sokhibov** (Uzbekistan) Abdullaev Azamat (Uzbekistan) Uktamov Akhrorbek	(Kyrgyzstan) Manas Karipov (Colombia) Edis Ibargüen García (Kyrgyzstan) **Mustafa Yusupov**	
Bashundhara Kings	(Brazil) Dorielton	(Brazil) Miguel Figueira	(Brazil) Robinho	(Nigeria) **Mfon Udoh**		(Uzbekistan) Asror Gofurov (Uzbekistan) Boburbek Yuldashov		(Ivory Coast) Didier Brossou
Brothers Union	(The Gambia) Yankuba Jallow	(The Gambia) Ousman Touray	(The Gambia) Patrick Sylva	(The Gambia) Mbye Faye	(The Gambia) Pape Musa Faye	(Uzbekistan) Nodirbek Mavlonov	(The Gambia) Essa Jallow (Egypt) Mostafa Kahraba (Uzbekistan) Bunyod Shodiev (Uzbekistan) Otabek Valizhonov	
Chittagong Abahani	(Nigeria) David Ifegwu	(Nigeria) Wasiu Semiu	(Nigeria) Paul Komolafe			(Uzbekistan) Sagdullaev Khudoyorkhon	(Nigeria) Abu Azeez (Nigeria) Lawal Muritala	
Fortis FC	(The Gambia) Omar Sarr	(The Gambia) Pa Omar Babou	(Ukraine) Valeriy Gryshyn			(Uzbekistan) Jasur Jumaev (Japan) Soma Otani		
Mohammedan SC	(Ivory Coast) Dosso Sidik	(Mali) Souleymane Diabate	(Nigeria) Emmanuel Agbaji	**(Nigeria) Sunday Emmanuel**		(Uzbekistan) Muzaffar Muzaffarov (Uzbekistan) Bekhruz Sadilloev	(Japan) Uryu Nagata	
Rahmatganj MFS	(The Gambia) Dawda Ceesay	(Ghana) Ernest Boateng	(Ghana) Samuel Mensah Konney	(Egypt) Mostafa Kahraba		(Uzbekistan) Ikhtiyor Tashpulatov (Uzbekistan) Iskandar Siddikzhonov		
Sheikh Jamal DC	(Brazil) Higor Leite	(Ghana) Philip Adjah	(Senegal) Abou Touré			(Uzbekistan) Shakhzod Shaymanov (Uzbekistan) Shokhrukhbek Kholmatov	(Colombia) Bladimir Diaz (Nigeria) **Stanley Dimgba**	
Sheikh Russel KC	**(Nigeria) Ganiu Ogungbe**	**(Guinea)** Sekou Sylla	(Serbia) Vojislav Balabanovic	(Ukraine) Valerii Stepanenko		(Japan) Kodai Iida (Uzbekistan) Akhror Umarjonov	(Haiti) Frantzety Herard (Kyrgyzstan) Almazbek Malikov (Burundi) **Landry Ndikumana** (Uzbekistan) Abdurakhmon Abdulkhakov	

Bashundhara's Mfon Udoh and Didier Brossou both had season-long contract with the club. The club registered Didier in the pre-season window while Mfon stayed in the club as unregistered player. Correspondingly, the club registered Mfon in the mid-season window while Didier stayed in the club as unregistered player till end of the season.
MID: The players are registered during the mid-season transfer window.

== League table ==
Pos	Team	Pld	W	D	L	GF	GA	GD	Pts	Qualification or relegation
1	Bashundhara Kings (C, W, Q)	18	14	3	1	49	13	+36	45	Qualification for the AFC Challenge League group stage and 2024 Bangladesh Challenge Cup
2	Mohammedan SC (Q)	18	9	8	1	40	17	+23	35	Qualification for the 2024 Bangladesh Challenge Cup (Note: being Bashundhara Kings Champions and winners of both league and 2023–24 Federation Cup, Mohammedan SC qualified for 2024 Bangladesh Challenge Cup after being runners-up in both league and cup.)
3	Abahani Ltd. Dhaka	18	9	5	4	34	22	+12	32	
4	Bangladesh Police FC	18	7	5	6	23	19	+4	26	
5	Fortis FC	18	6	6	6	21	23	−2	24	
6	Sheikh Russel KC	18	4	7	7	20	24	−4	19	
7	Chittagong Abahani	18	4	7	7	22	29	−7	19	
8	Sheikh Jamal DC	18	4	5	9	14	24	−10	17	
9	Rahmatganj MFS	18	2	10	6	19	26	−7	16	
10	Brothers Union	18	1	4	13	21	66	−45	7	

Source: Soccerway
Rules for classification: 1) Points; 2) Goal difference; 3) Goals scored.
(C) Champion; (Q) Qualify for the phase indicated; (W) Cup Winner

== Results ==
=== Results table ===
Home \ Away	ALD	BPFC	BDK	BUL	CAL	FFC	MSC	RMFS	SJDC	SRKC
Abahani Ltd. Dhaka	—	1–1	0–2	7–1	2–2	1–1	1–2	1–1	2–1	3–1
Bangladesh Police	1–2	—	0–3	2–0	2–0	1–2	2–3	2–0	0–1	1–0
Bashundhara Kings	2–1	2–2	—	5–2	4–1	3–1	0–1	4–1	2–0	1–1
Brothers Union	2–3	1–4	1–7	—	0–5	1–1	1–5	0–2	0–2	2–3
Chittagong Abahani	2–3	0–1	0–5	2–2	—	0–2	1–1	2–1	0–0	2–1
Fortis FC	1–0	2–1	0–1	2–2	1–3	—	1–2	2–2	0–0	1–2
Mohammedan	2–2	0–0	1–2	8–0	0–0	4–0	—	3–3	0–0	1–1
Rahmatganj	0–3	0–0	0–0	2–2	1–1	1–2	1–1	—	2–0	1–1
Sheikh Jamal	0–1	2–2	0–3	2–3	0–2	1–0	1–3	2–1	—	1–1
Sheikh Russel	0–1	0–1	1–3	4–1	1–1	0–0	1–4	0–0	2–1	—

Source: Soccerway
Legend: Blue = home team win; Yellow = draw; Red = away team win.

=== Positions by round ===
The following table lists the positions of teams after each week of matches. In order to preserve the chronological evolution, any postponed matches are not included to the round at which they were originally scheduled but added to the full round they were played immediately afterward.

Team ╲ Round	1	2	3	4	5	6	7	8	9	10	11	12	13	14	15	16	17	18
Abahani Ltd. Dhaka	5	8	5	3	4	3	3	3	3	3	3	3	3	3	3	3	3	3
Bangladesh Police	2	4	3	4	3	4	7	9	7	5	5	4	4	4	4	4	4	4
Bashundhara Kings	1	1	1	1	1	1	1	1	1	1	1	1	1	1	1	1	1	1
Brothers Union	10	9	10	10	10	10	10	10	10	10	10	10	10	10	10	10	10	10
Chittagong Abahani	9	10	9	9	9	8	4	4	8	8	9	7	5	5	5	5	7	7
Fortis FC	7	5	8	6	7	6	8	7	5	6	6	6	6	6	6	6	5	5
Mohammedan	3	2	2	2	2	2	2	2	2	2	2	2	2	2	2	2	2	2
Rahmatganj	6	7	6	5	6	5	6	8	9	9	8	9	9	9	9	9	9	9
Sheikh Jamal	8	6	7	8	5	9	5	5	4	4	4	5	7	7	7	7	8	8
Sheikh Russel	4	3	4	7	8	7	9	6	6	7	7	8	8	8	8	8	6	6

Leader
Runners-up

Source: Soccerway

=== Results by games ===
Team ╲ Round	1	2	3	4	5	6	7	8	9	10	11	12	13	14	15	16	17	18
Abahani Ltd. Dhaka	D	L	W	W	L	W	W	D	D	W	D	W	W	L	D	W	W	L
Bangladesh Police	W	L	W	L	D	L	L	L	W	W	D	W	D	W	D	D	L	W
Bashundhara Kings	W	W	W	W	W	L	W	W	D	W	W	W	W	W	W	D	D	W
Brothers Union	L	D	L	D	L	D	L	L	L	L	L	L	L	W	D	L	L	L
Chittagong Abahani	L	L	D	D	D	W	W	D	L	L	L	W	W	D	D	D	L	L
Fortis FC	L	W	L	D	D	D	L	W	W	L	D	L	W	L	D	D	W	W
Mohammedan	W	D	W	W	D	W	D	D	D	W	W	W	D	D	L	D	W	W
Rahmatganj	D	D	D	D	D	D	D	L	L	L	W	L	L	L	D	D	D	L
Sheikh Jamal	L	W	L	L	W	L	W	D	W	D	D	L	L	L	D	D	L	L
Sheikh Russel	W	D	L	L	D	D	L	W	D	D	L	L	L	W	D	D	W	L

Source: Soccerway
W = Win; D = Draw; L = Lose

== Season statistics ==
=== Scoring ===
- First goal of the season:
  (Bangladesh) Shahriar Emon for Mohammedan SC against Fortis FC (22 December 2023)
- Final goal of the season:
  (Bangladesh) Arif Hossain for Mohammedan SC against Dhaka Abahani (29 May 2024)

=== Goalscorers ===
There have been 263 goals scored in 90 matches, for an average of 2.92 goals per match. Source: Soccerway

19 Goals

- (Saint Vincent and the Grenadines) Cornelius Stewart (Abahani Ltd Dhaka)

17 Goals

- (Mali) Souleymane Diabate (Mohammedan SC)

14 Goals

- (Brazil) Dorielton Gomes (Bashundhara Kings)

10 Goals

- (Bangladesh) Rakib Hossain (Bashundhara Kings)

9 Goals

- (Ghana) Ernest Boateng (Rahmatganj MFS)
- (Brazil) Miguel Figueira (Bashundhara Kings)

7 Goals

- (Brazil) Robinho Azevedo (Bashundhara Kings)

6 Goals

- (Bangladesh) Md Rabby Hossen Rahul (Brothers Union)
- (Brazil) Jonathan Fernandes (Abahani Ltd Dhaka)
- (Burundi) Landry Ndikumana (Sheikh Russel KC)
- (Venezuela) Edward Morillo (Bangladesh Police FC)
- (The Gambia) Pa Omar Babou (Fortis FC)
- (Ghana) Samuel Mensah Konney (Rahmatganj MFS)

5 Goals

- (Colombia) Edis Ibargüen García (Bangladesh Police FC)
- (Uzbekistan) Muzaffar Muzaffarov (Mohammedan SC)
- (Nigeria) Ojukwu David Ifegwu (Chittagong Abahani)
- (Ukraine) Valeriy Gryshyn (Fortis FC)

4 Goals

- (Bangladesh) Eleta Kingsley (Brothers Union)
- (Bangladesh) Jafar Iqbal (Mohammedan SC)
- (Bangladesh) Mahbubur Rahman Sufil (Brothers Union)
- (Brazil) Washington Brandão (Abahani Ltd Dhaka)
- (Nigeria) Paul Komolafe (Chittagong Abahani)
- (Uzbekistan) Shokhrukhbek Kholmatov (Sheikh Jamal DC)
- (The Gambia) Omar Sarr (Fortis FC)

3 Goals

- (Bangladesh) Arif Hossain (Mohammedan SC)
- (Bangladesh) Riaj Uddin Sagor (Chittagong Abahani)
- (Bangladesh) Shahriar Emon (Mohammedan SC)
- (Nigeria) Mfon Udoh (Bashundhara Kings)
- (Bangladesh) Mannaf Rabby (Chittagong Abahani)
- (Nigeria) Sunday Emmanuel (Mohammedan SC)
- (Bangladesh) Sumon Reza (Sheikh Russel KC)
- (Brazil) Bruno Goncalves Rocha (Abahani Limited Dhaka)
- (Serbia) Vojislav Balabanovic (Sheikh Russel KC)

2 Goals

- (Bangladesh) Akmol Hossain Nayon (Brothers Union)
- (Bangladesh) Minhajul Abedin Ballu (Mohammedan SC)
- (Bangladesh) Nasiruddin Chowdhury (Chittagong Abahani)
- Syed Shah Quazem Kirmane (Bangladesh Police FC)
- Md Al Amin (Bangladesh Police FC)
- (Bangladesh) Sazzad Hossain (Sheikh Jamal DC)
- (Brazil) Higor Leite (Sheikh Jamal DC)
- (Uzbekistan) Otabek Valizhonov (Brothers Union)
- (The Gambia) Dawda Ceesay (Rahmatganj MFS)
- (Uzbekistan) Asror Gofurov (Bashundhara Kings)
- (Nigeria) Emmanuel Tony Agbaji (Mohammedan SC)
- Sahed Miah (Bangladesh Police FC)
- (Nigeria) Ganiu Ogungbe (Sheikh Russel KC)
- (Colombia) Mateo Palacios (Bangladesh Police FC)

1 Goal

- (Bangladesh) Shekh Morsalin (Bashundhara Kings)
- (Bangladesh) Sabuz Hossain (Fortis FC)
- Din Islam (Bangladesh Police FC)
- (Bangladesh) Mohammad Abdullah (Sheikh Jamal DC)
- (Bangladesh) Rashedul Islam Rashed (Fortis FC)
- (Japan) Kodai Iida (Sheikh Russel KC)
- (Nigeria) Abu Azeez (Chittagong Abahani)
- (Bangladesh) Rimon Hossain (Bashundhara Kings)
- (Bangladesh) Maraz Hossain Opi (Abahani Limited Dhaka)
- (Bangladesh) Sohanur Rahman Sohan (Chittagong Abahani)
- (Bangladesh) Mohammad Ibrahim (Bashundhara Kings)
- (Bangladesh) Samin Yasir Juel (Rahmatganj MFS)
- (Uzbekistan) Jasur Jumaev (Fortis FC)
- (Bangladesh) Yeasin Khan (Chittagong Abahani)
- (Bangladesh) Mohammad Ridoy (Abahani Ltd Dhaka)
- (Bangladesh) Saad Uddin (Bashundhara Kings)
- (Bangladesh) Md Insan Hossain (Brothers Union)
- (Bangladesh) Mohamed Sohel Rana (Chittagong Abahani)
- (Bangladesh) Sohel Rana (Bashundhara Kings)
- (Guinea) Sekou Sylla (Sheikh Russel KC)
- (Egypt) Mostafa Kahraba (Rahmatganj MFS)
- (Senegal) Abou Touré (Sheikh Jamal DC)
- (Bangladesh) Md Jewel Mia (Mohammedan SC)
- (Bangladesh) Mohsin Ahmed (Brothers Union)
- MS Bablu (Bangladesh Police FC)
- (Uzbekistan) Shakhzod Shaymanov (Sheikh Jamal DC)
- (Uzbekistan) Nodir Mavlonov (Brothers Union)
- Mahdi Yusuf Khan (Bangladesh Police FC)
- (Bangladesh) Chandon Roy (Sheikh Russel KC)
- (Uzbekistan) Ahror Umarjonov (Sheikh Russel KC)
- (Uzbekistan) Abdullaev Azamat (Bangladesh Police FC)

=== Own goals ===
† Bold Club indicates winner of the match.

Player	Club	Opponent	Result	Date	Ref
(Bangladesh) Isa Faysal	Bangladesh Police FC	Sheikh Jamal DC	0–1	30 December 2023	
(Bangladesh) Tariq Kazi	Bashundhara Kings	Fortis FC	1–3	12 January 2024	
(Bangladesh) Assaduzzaman Bablu	Abahani Limited Dhaka	Bangladesh Police FC	2–1	2 February 2024	
(Nigeria) Lawal Muritala	Chittagong Abahani	Fortis FC	0–2	24 February 2024	
(Bangladesh) Mamun Alif	Rahmatganj MFS	Chittagong Abahani	2–1	20 April 2024	
(Bangladesh) Abdullah Omar	Fortis FC	Sheikh Russel KC	1–2	4 May 2024	

=== Hat-tricks ===
† Bold Club indicates winner of the match.

Player	For	Against	Result	Date	Ref
(Burundi) Landry Ndikumana	Sheikh Russel KC	Brothers Union	(H) 4–1	17 February 2024	
(Colombia) Edis Ibargüen García	Bangladesh Police FC	Brothers Union	(A) 4–1	24 February 2024	
(Mali) Souleymane Diabate	Mohammedan SC	Brothers Union	(H) 8–0	20 April 2024	
(Saint Vincent and the Grenadines) Cornelius Stewart^{4}	Abahani Limited Dhaka	Brothers Union	(H) 7–1	17 May 2024	
(Saint Vincent and the Grenadines) Cornelius Stewart	Abahani Limited Dhaka	Brothers Union	(A) 2–3	25 May 2024	

=== Most assists ===
As of 29 May 2024

Rank	Player	Team	Assists
1	(Brazil) Robinho Azevedo	Bashundhara Kings	10
2	(Egypt) Mostafa Kahraba	Brothers Union /Rahmatganj MFS	6
2	(Brazil) Miguel Figueira	Bashundhara Kings	6
2	(Mali) Souleymane Diabate	Mohammedan SC	6
2	(Brazil) Jonathan Fernandes	Abahani Limited Dhaka	6
3	(Brazil) Dorielton	Bashundhara Kings	5
3	(Saint Vincent and the Grenadines) Cornelius Stewart	Abahani Limited Dhaka	5
3	(Uzbekistan) Muzaffar Muzaffarov	Mohammedan SC	5
4	(Venezuela) Edward Morillo	Bangladesh Police FC	4
4	(Colombia) Mateo Palacios	Bangladesh Police FC	4
4	(Nigeria) Sunday Emmanuel	Dhaka Mohammedan	4

=== Clean sheets by goalkeepers ===
As of 29 May 2024

Rank	Player	Club	Matches	Clean sheets
1	(Bangladesh) Ahsan Habib Bipu	Bangladesh Police FC	17	8
2	(Bangladesh) Mahfuz Hasan Pritom	Sheikh Jamal DC	16	6
3	(Bangladesh) Sujon Hossain	Mohammedan SC	16	5
3	(Bangladesh) Anisur Rahman Zico	Bashundhara Kings	11	5
3	(Bangladesh) Mohammed Mamun Alif	Rahmatganj MFS	6	3
3	(Bangladesh) Ashraful Islam Rana	Chittagong Abahani	16	3
3	(Bangladesh) Shahidul Alam Sohel	Abahani Limited Dhaka	14	3

=== Discipline ===
As of 29 May 2024

==== Player ====
- Most yellow cards: 8
  - (Uzbekistan) Shokhrukhbek Kholmatov (Sheikh Jamal DC)
- Most red cards: 1
  - 14 players

==== Club ====
- Yellow cards:

As of 29 May 2024

Rank	Club	Yellow cards
1	Sheikh Jamal DC	45
2	Bashundhara Kings	42
3	Abahani Limited Dhaka	36
4	Rahmatganj MFS	33
4	Fortis FC	33
5	Mohammedan SC	32
5	Brothers Union	32
6	Sheikh Russel KC	31
7	Chittagong Abahani	28
8	Bangladesh Police FC	25
Total		337

- Red cards:

As of 29 May 2024

Rank	Club	Red cards/Sent off
1	Sheikh Russel KC	4
2	Brothers Union	3
2	Sheikh Jamal DC	3
3	Abahani Limited Dhaka	2
3	Bashundhara Kings	2
3	Bangladesh Police FC	2
4	Mohammedan SC	1
4	Fortis FC	1
Total		18

== Individual awards ==
=== Man of the match ===
- Valeriy Gryshyn won the most Man of the match awards (4).

† Bold club indicates winner of the match.

=== First Leg ===
Round 1

Match no.	Player	Club	Opponent	Date	References
1	(Bangladesh) Md Nayem	Rahmatganj MFS	Abahani Ltd. Dhaka	22 December 2023	
2	(Colombia) Edis Ibargüen García	Police FC	Chittagong Abahani	22 December 2023	
3	(Nigeria) Emmanuel Tony	Mohammedan SC	Fortis FC	22 December 2023	
4	(Bangladesh) Rakib Hossain	Bashundhara Kings	Brothers Union	22 December 2023	
5	(Nigeria) Ganiu Ogungbe	Sheikh Russel KC	Sheikh Jamal DC	23 December 2023	

Round 2

Match no.	Player	Club	Opponent	Date	References
6	(Japan) Kodai Iida	Sheikh Russel KC	Mohammedan SC	29 December 2023	
7	(Bangladesh) Samin Yasir Juel	Rahmatganj MFS	Brothers Union	29 December 2023	
8	(Brazil) Robinho	Bashundhara Kings	Chittagong Abahani	30 December 2023	
9	(Ukraine) Valeriy Gryshyn	Fortis FC	Abahani Ltd. Dhaka	30 December 2023	
10	(Bangladesh) Mahfuz Hasan Pritom	Sheikh Jamal DC	Police FC	30 December 2023	

Round 3

Match no.	Player	Club	Opponent	Date	References
11	(Saint Vincent and the Grenadines) Cornelius Stewart	Abahani Ltd. Dhaka	Sheikh Jamal DC	12 January 2024	
12	(Nigeria) Sunday Emmanuel	Mohammedan SC	Brothers Union	12 January 2024	
13	(Bangladesh) Riaj Uddin Sagor	Chittagong Abahani	Rahmatganj MFS	12 January 2024	
14	(Bangladesh) Rakib Hossain(2)	Bashundhara Kings	Fortis FC	12 January 2024	
15	(Venezuela) Edward Morillo	Police FC	Sheikh Russel KC	13 January 2024	

Round 4

Match no.	Player	Club	Opponent	Date	References
16	(Brazil) Robinho(2)	Bashundhara Kings	Sheikh Jamal DC	19 January 2024	
17	(Ukraine) Valeriy Gryshyn(2)	Fortis FC	Rahmatganj MFS	19 January 2024	
18	(Uzbekistan) Muzaffar Muzaffarov	Mohammedan SC	Police FC	20 January 2024	
19	(Saint Vincent and the Grenadines) Cornelius Stewart(2)	Abahani Ltd. Dhaka	Sheikh Russel KC	20 January 2024	
20	(Bangladesh) Mahbubur Rahman Sufil	Brothers Union	Chittagong Abahani	20 January 2024	

Round 5

Match no.	Player	Club	Opponent	Date	References
21	(Brazil) Miguel Figueira	Bashundhara Kings	Abahani Ltd. Dhaka	26 January 2024	
22	(Uzbekistan) Muzaffar Muzaffarov(2)	Mohammedan SC	Chittagong Abahani	26 January 2024	
23	(Bangladesh) Sazzad Hossain	Sheikh Jamal DC	Brothers Union	26 January 2024	
24	(The Gambia) Pa Omar Babou	Fortis FC	Sheikh Russel KC	27 January 2024	
25	(Bangladesh) Md Rajon Howleder	Rahmatganj MFS	Police FC	27 January 2024	

Round 6

Match no.	Player	Club	Opponent	Date	References
26	(Bangladesh) Rabiul Hasan	Abahani Ltd. Dhaka	Police FC	2 February 2024	
27	(Bangladesh) Mitul Marma	Sheikh Russel KC	Rahmatganj MFS	2 February 2024	
28	(Nigeria) David Ifegwu	Chittagong Abahani	Sheikh Jamal DC	3 February 2024	
29	(The Gambia) Pa Omar Babou(2)	Fortis FC	Brothers Union	3 February 2024	
30	(Bangladesh) Minhajul Abedin Ballu	Mohammedan SC	Bashundhara Kings	3 February 2024	

Round 7

Match no.	Player	Club	Opponent	Date	References
31	(Brazil) Jonathan Fernandes	Abahani Ltd. Dhaka	Brothers Union	9 February 2024	
32	(The Gambia) Dawda Ceesay	Rahmatganj MFS	Mohammedan SC	9 February 2024	
33	(Nigeria) David Ifegwu(2)	Chittagong Abahani	Sheikh Russel KC	10 February 2024	
34	(Uzbekistan) Asror Gafurov	Bashundhara Kings	Police FC	10 February 2024	
35	(Ukraine) Valeriy Gryshyn(3)	Fortis FC	Sheikh Jamal DC	10 February 2024	

Round 8

Match no.	Player	Club	Opponent	Date	References
36	(Ukraine) Valeriy Gryshyn(4)	Fortis FC	Police FC	16 February 2024	
37	(Brazil) Miguel Figueira(2)	Bashundhara Kings	Rahmatganj MFS	16 February 2024	
38	(Nigeria) David Ifegwu(3)	Chittagong Abahani	Abahani Ltd. Dhaka	17 February 2024	
39	(Bangladesh) Mahfuz Hasan Pritom(2)	Sheikh Jamal DC	Mohammedan SC	17 February 2024	
40	(Burundi) Landry Ndikumana	Sheikh Russel KC	Brothers Union	17 February 2024	

Round 9

Match no.	Player	Club	Opponent	Date	References
41	(Japan) Kodai Iida(2)	Sheikh Russel KC	Bashundhara Kings	23 February 2024	
42	(Uzbekistan) Shokhrukhbek Kholmatov	Sheikh Jamal DC	Rahmatganj MFS	23 February 2024	
43	(Brazil) Bruno Goncalves Rocha	Abahani Ltd. Dhaka	Mohammedan SC	23 February 2024	
44	(Colombia) Edis Ibargüen García(2)	Police FC	Brothers Union	24 February 2024	
45	(The Gambia) Omar Sarr	Fortis FC	Chittagong Abahani	24 February 2024	

=== Second Leg ===
Round 10

Match no.	Player	Club	Opponent	Date	References
46	(Bangladesh) Md Al Amin	Police FC	Chittagong Abahani	29 March 2024	
47	(Guinea) Sekou Sylla	Sheikh Russel KC	Sheikh Jamal DC	29 March 2024	
48	(Uzbekistan) Muzaffar Muzaffarov(3)	Mohammedan SC	Fortis FC	29 March 2024	
49	(Brazil) Miguel Figueira (3)	Bashundhara Kings	Brothers Union	30 March 2024	
50	(Brazil) Jonathan Fernandes(2)	Abahani Ltd. Dhaka	Rahmatganj MFS	30 March 2024	

Round 11

Match no.	Player	Club	Opponent	Date	References
51	(The Gambia) Pa Omar Babou(3)	Fortis FC	Abahani Ltd. Dhaka	05 April 2024	
52	(Bangladesh) Rakib Hossain (3)	Bashundhara Kings	Chittagong Abahani	05 April 2024	
53	(Egypt) Mostafa Kahraba	Rahmatganj MFS	Brothers Union	05 April 2024	
54	(Uzbekistan) Muzaffar Muzaffarov(4)	Mohammedan SC	Sheikh Russel KC	06 April 2024	
55	(Senegal) Abou Touré	Sheikh Jamal DC	Police FC	06 April 2024	

Round 12

Match no.	Player	Club	Opponent	Date	References
56	(Saint Vincent and the Grenadines) Cornelius Stewart(3)	Abahani Ltd. Dhaka	Sheikh Jamal DC	19 April 2024	
57	(Bangladesh) Syed Shah Quazem Kirmane	Police FC	Sheikh Russel KC	19 April 2024	
58	(Brazil) Miguel Figueira (4)	Bashundhara Kings	Fortis FC	19 April 2024	
59	(Mali) Souleymane Diabate	Mohammedan SC	Brothers Union	20 April 2024	
60	(Bangladesh) Ashraful Islam Rana	Chittagong Abahani	Rahmatganj MFS	20 April 2024	

Round 13

Match no.	Player	Club	Opponent	Date	References
61	(Brazil) Bruno Goncalves Rocha (2)	Abahani Ltd. Dhaka	Sheikh Russel KC	26 April 2024	
62	(Bangladesh) Rasedul Islam Rashed	Fortis FC	Rahmatganj MFS	26 April 2024	
63	(Nigeria) Paul Komolafe	Chittagong Abahani	Brothers Union	26 April 2024	
64	(Bangladesh) Jafar Iqbal	Mohammedan SC	Police FC	27 April 2024	
65	(Brazil) Dorielton Gomes	Bashundhara Kings	Sheikh Jamal DC	27 April 2024	

Round 14

Match no.	Player	Club	Opponent	Date	References
66	(Nigeria) David Ifegwu (4)	Chittagong Abahani	Mohammedan SC	03 May 2024	
67	(Bangladesh) Rabby Hossen Rahul	Brothers Union	Sheikh Jamal DC	03 May 2024	
68	(Venezuela) Edward Morillo (2)	Police FC	Rahmatganj MFS	03 May 2024	
69	(Nigeria) Ganiu Ogungbe	Sheikh Russel KC	Fortis FC	4 May 2024	
70	(Bangladesh) Rakib Hossain (4)	Bashundhara Kings	Abahani Ltd. Dhaka	4 May 2024	

=== Player of the round ===
The 'Player of the round' is selected by fans through a poll conducted on the official Facebook page of BPL after each gameweek. The nominated players are the MOTM winners of each match of the relevant round.

Round	Player	Club	Votes earned (%)	References
1	(Bangladesh) Rakib Hossain	Bashundhara Kings	73	
2	(Brazil) Robinho	Bashundhara Kings	75	
3	(Bangladesh) Rakib Hossain	Bashundhara Kings	88	
4	(Brazil) Robinho	Bashundhara Kings	70	
5	(Brazil) Miguel Figueira	Bashundhara Kings	49	
6	(Bangladesh) Minhajul Abedin Ballu	Mohammedan SC	67	
7	(Brazil) Fernandes	Abahani Limited Dhaka	44	
8	TBD	TBD	TBD	
9	TBD	TBD	TBD	

=== Referee of the month ===
Month	Name	References
December	(Bangladesh) Alamgir Sarkar	

== Best Player Awards ==
Best Player	Top Goalscorer	Best Goalkeeper	Fair Play Award
(Bangladesh) Rakib Hossain	(Saint Vincent and the Grenadines) Cornelius Stewart	(Bangladesh) Ahsan Habib	Fortis FC

== Attendances ==
#	Football club	Average attendance
1	Bashundhara Kings	1,614
2	Mohammedan SC	1,094
3	Abahani Limited Dhaka	788
4	Fortis FC	219
5	Bangladesh Police FC	176
6	Sheikh Russel KC	125
7	Rahmatganj MFS	120
8	Sheikh Jamal DC	114
9	Chittagong Abahani	109
10	Brothers Union	104

== See also ==
- 2023–24 Bangladesh Championship League
- 2023–24 BFF U-18 Football League
- 2023–24 Federation Cup (Bangladesh)
- 2023–24 Bangladesh Women's Football League
