= 2022–23 Bangladesh Police FC season =

Bangladesh Police FC
2022–23 season
- President: Abdullah Al-Mamun
- Head coach: Aristică Cioabă
- Stadium: Rafiq Uddin Bhuiyan Stadium
- Bangladesh Premier League: 3rd of 11
- Federation Cup: Group stages
- Independence Cup: Fourth-place
- Top goalscorer: League: Edward Morillo (8 goals); All: Edward Morillo (10 goals)
- Biggest win: 5–4 Vs Muktijoddha Sangsad KC (27 November 2022)
- Biggest defeat: 1–4 Vs Dhaka Abahani (4 December 2022)
Home colours	Away colours

The 2022–23 season was Bangladesh Police Football Club's 4th season in the top flight, Bangladesh Premier League. In addition to domestic league, Bangladesh Police FC was participated on this season's edition of Federation Cup and Independence Cup. The season covered period was 8 October 2022 to 22 July 2023.

== Current squad ==
Bangladesh Police FC squad for 2022–23 season.

As of 26 December 2022

Note: Flags indicate national team as defined under FIFA eligibility rules; some limited exceptions apply. Players may hold more than one non-FIFA nationality.

No.	Pos.	Nation	Player
1	GK	BAN	Dinaj Hosen Jubed
2	DF	UZB	Solibek Korimov
3	DF	BAN	Shamol Bepari
5	MF	BAN	Monjurur Rahman Manik
6	MF	BAN	Monaem Khan Raju
7	FW	BAN	M S Bablu
8	MF	BAN	Rabiul Hasan
10	FW	VEN	Edward Enrique Morillo Jimenéz
11	MF	BAN	Sahed Hossain Miah
12	MF	COL	Mateo Palacios
13	GK	BAN	Mohamed Limon Islam Badhon
15	MF	BAN	Mohammed Shamim Ahmed
16	FW	COL	Johan Arango
17	DF	BAN	Isa Faysal
18	MF	BAN	Fahim Morshed
19	FW	BAN	Arifur Rahman Raju
20	MF	BAN	Komol Barua
21	DF	KGZ	Almazbek Malikov
22	GK	BAN	Rakibul Hasan Tushar
23	MF	BAN	Syed Shah Quazem Kirmane
25	DF	BAN	Ismail Hossen
26	DF	IRI	Behnam Habibi
27	MF	BAN	Mohamed Mithu Bhuiyan
28	FW	BAN	Mohammad Al Amim
29	FW	BAN	Akikul Islam
30	FW	BAN	Zillur Rahman
31	GK	BAN	Mohammad Nehal
33	DF	BAN	Akibur Rahman
35	MD	BAN	Razuan Kabir
37	DF	BAN	Mohamed Esanur Rahman
38	DF	BAN	Mohamed Rasel Hossain
40	FW	BAN	Rashedul Islam Jihan
60	GK	BAN	Saiful Islam Khan
70	MF	BAN	Mohammad Afsaruzzaman Choton
75	FW	BAN	Morshedul Islam
77	DF	BAN	Joyonto Kumar Roy
87	MF	BAN	Mohamed Ashraful Chowdhury
99	FW	BAN	Amir Ali

== Pre-season friendly ==
4 November 2022 Friendly	Bangladesh Police FC	0–2	Bashundhara Kings	Dhaka
14:00			Dorielton 16', 33'	Stadium: Bashundhara Kings Arena

== Transfer ==
=== In ===
No.	Pos	Player	Previous club	Fee	Date	Source
18	FW	(Bangladesh) Fahim Morshed	(Bangladesh) Bashundhara Kings	Free	8 October 2022	
22	GK	(Bangladesh) Rakibul Hasan Tushar	(Bangladesh) Rahmatganj MFS	Free	19 October 2022	
9	FW	(Panama) José Hernandez	(Maldives) Club Green Streets	Free	19 October 2022	
21	DF	(Kyrgyzstan) Almazbek Malikov	(Kyrgyzstan) FC Neftchi	Free	22 October 2022	
12	MF	(Venezuela) Edward Morillo	(Nicaragua) Managua FC	Free	22 October 2022	
11	MF	(Bangladesh) Sahed Hossain	(Bangladesh) Mohammedan SC	Free	23 October 2022	
87	MF	(Bangladesh) Md Ashraful Chowdhury	(Bangladesh) Swadhinata KS	Free	7 November 2022	
70	MF	(Bangladesh) Mohammad Afsaruzzaman Choton	(Bangladesh) Swadhinata KS	Free	7 November 2022	
30	FW	(Bangladesh) Zillur Rahman	(Bangladesh) Swadhinata KS	Free	7 November 2022	
5	DF	(Bangladesh) Monjurur Rahman Manik	(Bangladesh) Saif SC	Free	7 November 2022	
35	MF	(Bangladesh) Razuan Kabir	(Bangladesh) NoFeL SC	Free	7 November 2022	
27	MF	(Bangladesh) Md Mithu	(Bangladesh) Uttar Baridhara	Free	7 November 2022	
8	MF	(Bangladesh) Rabiul Hasan	(Bangladesh) Chittagong Abahani Limited	Free	7 November 2022	
12	MF	(Colombia) Mateo Palacios	(Colombia) Deportivo Pasto	Free	7 November 2022	
26	DF	(Iran) Behnam Habibi	(Thailand) Chamchuri United	Free	7 November 2022	
7	MF	(Colombia) Johan Arango	(Peru) Binacional FC	Free	14 March 2023	
–	DF	(Uzbekistan) Solibek Korimov	(Uzbekistan) FC G'ijdivon	Free	17 March 2023	

=== Out ===
No.	Pos	Player	Moved to	Fee	Date	Source
4	DF	(Brazil) Danilo Quipapá	(Brazil) Fortis FC	Free	4 August 2022	
20	FW	(Bangladesh) Amirul Islam		Retired	21 July 2022	
9	FW	(Afghanistan) Amredin Sharifi	(Afghanistan) Fortis FC	Free	21 October 2022	
88	MF	(Ivory Coast) Djedje Maximin Djawa	(Tunisia) EO Sidi Bouzid	Undisclosed	21 October 2022	
26	DF	(Iran) Behnam Habibi	Unattached	Undisclosed	10 March 2023	

== Competitions ==
Win Draw Loss Fixtures

=== Overall ===
Competition	First match	Last match	Final Position
BPL	10 December 2022	22 July 2023	3rd
Federation Cup	3 January 2023	24 January 2023	Group stages
Independence Cup	16 November 2022	4 December 2022	Third-place

=== Overview ===
Competition	Record							
Competition	Pld	W	D	L	GF	GA	GD	Win %
BPL	20	10	5	5	39	21	+18	50.00
Independence Cup	5	3	1	1	15	13	+2	60.00
Federation Cup	2	0	0	2	0	2	−2	0.00
Total	27	13	6	8	54	36	+18	48.15

Source: Competitions

=== Premier League ===
==== League table ====
Pos	Team	Pld	W	D	L	GF	GA	GD	Pts	Qualification or relegation
1	Bashundhara Kings (C, Q)	20	18	1	1	51	13	+38	55	Qualification for the AFC Challenge League play-off round
2	Dhaka Abahani	20	12	4	4	45	18	+27	40	
3	Bangladesh Police FC	20	10	5	5	39	21	+18	35	
4	Mohammedan SC	20	9	5	6	38	21	+17	32	
5	Sheikh Russel KC	20	8	6	6	33	30	+3	30	

Source: Soccerway
Rules for classification: 1) Points; 2) Goal difference; 3) Goals scored.
(C) Champion; (Q) Qualify for the AFC competition

==== Results summary ====
Overall								Home						Away					
Pld	W	D	L	GF	GA	GD	Pts	W	D	L	GF	GA	GD	W	D	L	GF	GA	GD
20	10	5	5	39	21	+18	35	5	3	2	21	10	+11	5	2	3	18	11	+7

Source: Soccerway

==== Results by round ====
Round	1	2	3	4	5	6	7	8	9	10	11	12	13	14	15	16	17	18	19	20	21	22
Ground	A	H	A	H	A	H	A	H	A	(Note: No Bangladesh Police FC matchday in this round.)	H	H	A	H	A	H	A	H	A	H	(Note: No Bangladesh Police FC matchday in this round.)	A
Result	W	D	L	D	L	W	D	W	W	–	D	L	D	L	L	W	W	W	W	W	–	W
Position	3	5	5	6	6	4	4	3	4	3	3	4	4	6	6	5	3	3	3	3	3	3

Source: Matches
A = Away; H = Home; W = Win; D = Draw; L = Loss; P = Postponed

=== Matches ===
10 December 2022 1	Sheikh Russel KC	1–2	Bangladesh Police FC	Dhaka
14:30 BST (UTC+6)	Mfon 4'	Report	Jose Alexander Hernandez 7'; Edward Morillo 40'; Joyonto Kumar Roy (yellow card) 77'; Mateo Palacios (yellow card) 90+6'	Stadium: Bashundhara Kings Arena; Referee: Md Mizanur Rahman

24 December 2022 2	Bangladesh Police FC	0–0	Dhaka Mohammedan	Mymensingh
14:30 BST (UTC+6)	Monaem (yellow card) 20'; Joyonto Kumar Roy (yellow card) 27'; Edward Enrique Morillo Jimenéz (yellow card) 34'; Almazbek Malikov (yellow card) 34'; Mohamed Mithu Bhuiyan (yellow card) 64'; José Alexander Hernández (yellow card) 76'	Report	Manik (yellow card) 72'; Mehedi (yellow card) 77'	Stadium: Rafiq Uddin Bhuiyan Stadium; Referee: Mohammed Nasiruddin

30 December 2022 3	Sheikh Jamal DC	1–0	Bangladesh Police FC	Gopalganj
14:30 BST (UTC+6)	Stewart 24' (pen.); Kawshik Barua (yellow card) 53'	Report	Monaem (yellow card) 33'	Stadium: Sheikh Fazlul Haque Mani Stadium; Referee: Bhubon Mohon Tarafder

7 January 2023 4	Bangladesh Police FC	0–0	Dhaka Abahani	Mymensingh
14:45 BST (UTC+6)	Edward Enrique; Morillo Jimenéz (yellow card) 36'	Report	Sohel (yellow card) 21'	Stadium: Rafiq Uddin Bhuiyan Stadium; Referee: Mohamed Alamgir

13 January 2023 5	Bashundhara Kings	1–0	Bangladesh Police FC	Dhaka
14:45 BST (UTC+6)	Saad (yellow card) 22'; Dorielton 28'; Sohel (yellow card) 30' (yellow-red card) 76'; Rimon (yellow card) 71'	Report	Rabiul (yellow card) 6'	Stadium: Bashundhara Kings Arena; Referee: Jasim Akther

20 January 2023 6	Bangladesh Police FC	4–0	AFC Uttara	Mymensingh
15:00 BST (UTC+6)	Rabiul 15', 59' (yellow card) 44'; José Alexander Hernández 23'; Monaem (yellow card) 47'; Mateo Palacios 75'	Report	Zahidul Islam Babu (yellow card) 43'; Jayed Ahmed (yellow card) 52'	Stadium: Rafiq Uddin Bhuiyan Stadium; Referee: Anisur Rahman

28 January 2023 7	Fortis FC	1–1	Bangladesh Police FC	Rajshahi
15:00 BST (UTC+6)	Shakhawat 38'; Md Rafiqul Islam (yellow card) 79'	Report	Fahim Morshed (yellow card) 8'; Rabiul (yellow card) 19'; Edward Enrique Morillo Jimenéz 40'; Sahed Hossain Miah (yellow card) 79'	Stadium: Muktijuddho Sriti Stadium; Referee: Rimon Mahmud

4 February 2023 8	Bangladesh Police FC	2–0	Rahmatganj MFS	Mymensingh
15:15 BST (UTC+6)	Almazbek Malikov (yellow card) 11' (goal) 22'; Mohammed Mithu Bhuiyan (yellow card) 48'; Mateo Palacios 72'	Report	Didayul Islam Sagor (yellow card) 21'	Stadium: Rafiq Uddin Bhuiyan Stadium; Referee: Md Jalal Uddin

11 February 2023 9	Muktijoddha Sangsad KC	0–1	Bangladesh Police FC	Gopalganj
15:45 BST (UTC+6)		Report	Monaem (yellow card) 53'; Edward Enrique Morillo Jimenéz 78'	Stadium: Sheikh Fazlul Haque Mani Stadium; Referee: Bituraj Barua

25 February 2023 11	Bangladesh Police FC	1–1	Chittagong Abahani	Mymensingh
15:45 BST (UTC+6)	Almazbek Malikov 4' (pen.); Joyonto Kumar Roy (yellow card) 42'; Edward Morillo (yellow card) 48'	Report	Emtiyaz Raihan (yellow card) 13'; Md Rokey (yellow card) 18'; Ojukwu David Ifegwu 43'; Augustine (yellow card) 90+4'	Stadium: Rafiq Uddin Bhuiyan Stadium; Referee: Md Masud Rana Mridha

8 April 2023 12	Bangladesh Police FC	1–3	Sheikh Russel KC	Mymensingh
15:45 BST (UTC+6)	Edward Morillo (yellow card) 24'; Arango 37'; Mohamed Mithu Bhuiyan (yellow card) 42'	Report	Brossou (yellow card) 45+4'; Ibrahim 49'; Mfon 81'; Nihat Jaman Ucchash 86'	Stadium: Rafiq Uddin Bhuiyan Stadium; Referee: Mahmud Zamal Farouquee Nahid

15 April 2023 13	Mohammedan SC	1–1	Bangladesh Police FC	Comilla
15:45 BST (UTC+6)	Emon 56'; Diabate (yellow card) 90+4'	Report	Arango 10' (yellow card) 90+5'; Mohammad Nehal (yellow card) 52'	Stadium: Shaheed Dhirendranath Datta Stadium; Referee: Md Anisur Rahman Sagor

28 April 2023 14	Bangladesh Police FC	1–2	Sheikh Jamal DC	Comilla
15:45 BST (UTC+6)	Johan (yellow card) 66' (yellow-red card) 68'; Mateo Palacios (yellow card) 66'; Bablu 82'	Report	Rashedul Islam Moni (yellow card) 2'; Abu Shaeid (yellow card) 25'; Sulayman Sillah 56'; Otabek Valizhonov (yellow card) 66' (goal) 90+3'; Aguilar (red card) 66'; Stewart (yellow card) 83'; Mohammed Nayeem (yellow card) 90+7'	Stadium: Rafiq Uddin Bhuiyan Stadium; Referee: Saymoon Hasan Sany

5 May 2023 15	Dhaka Abahani	4–1	Bangladesh Police FC	Comilla
16:00 BST (UTC+6)	Raphael 36' (pen.); Foysal 54'; Sohel 65'; Emeka 76'	Report	Mohamed Rasel Hossain (yellow card) 23'; Zillur Rahman 40'	Stadium: Shaheed Dhirendranath Datta Stadium; Referee: Md Mizanur Rahman

12 May 2023 16	Bangladesh Police FC	2–1	Bashundhara Kings	Mymensingh
16:00 BST (UTC+6)	Monaem (yellow card) 11'; Edward Morillo 32', 62'; Rabiul (yellow card) 89'; Quazem (yellow card) 90+3'	Report	Rakib (yellow card) 9' (goal) 47'	Stadium: Rafiq Uddin Bhuiyan Stadium; Attendance: 2,012; Referee: Md Anisur Rahman Sagor

20 May 2023 17	AFC Uttara	0–7	Bangladesh Police FC	Mymensingh
16:00 BST (UTC+6)		Report	Aarango (yellow card) 5' (goal) 19', 82' (pen.); Rabiul 32'; Quazem 48'; Mohammed Abdallah 55', 62'; Edward Morillo 79'; Shamol Bepari (yellow card) 81'	Stadium: Rafiq Uddin Bhuiyan Stadium; Referee: Md Jalal Uddin

27 May 2023 18	Bangladesh Police FC	4–2	Fortis FC	Mymensingh
16:00 BST (UTC+6)	Mate Palacios 6'; Edeard Morillo 15'; Fahim Morshed (yellow card) 60'; Arango 81'; Joyon Kumar Roy (yellow card) 85'; Shahed Miah 90'	Report	Pa Omar (yellow card) 60'; Garcia Joof 63', 90+3'	Stadium: Rafiq Uddin Bhuiyan Stadium; Referee: Mahmud Zamal Farouquee Nahid

3 June 2023 19	Rahmatganj MFS	0–2	Bangladesh Police FC	Munshigonj
16:00 BST (UTC+6)	Habibur Rahman Nolok (yellow card) 31'	Report	Bablu 4'; Arango 49'; Zillur Rahman (yellow card) 65'; Monaem (yellow card) 87'	Stadium: Shaheed Bir Sreshtho Flight Lt. Matiur Rahman Stadium; Referee: Md Nasir Uddin

8 June 2023 20	Bangladesh Police FC	6–1	Muktijoddha Sangsad KC	Mymensingh
16:00 BST (UTC+6)	Edward Morillo 1', 89'; Joyonto Kumar Roy 21'; Arango 64' (yellow card) 71'; Abdullah 70'; Shahed Hossain Miah 90+2'	Report	Uzochukwu 62' (pen.); Mahdud Hossain Fahim (yellow card) 71'	Stadium: Rafiq Uddin Bhuiyan Stadium; Referee: Md Alamgir Sarker

22 July 2023 22	Chittagong Abahani	2–3	Bangladesh Police FC	Munshigonj
16:00 BST (UTC+6)	Mohamed Imran Hassan Rimon (yellow card) 37'; Ifegwu 74' (pen.); Mohammad Nahiyan 90+4'	Report	Abdullah 9'; Mateo Palacios 19'; Rabiul 28'; Akibur Rahman (yellow card) 53'; Mohamed Mithu Bhuiyan (yellow card) 76'; Joyonto Kumar Roy (yellow card) 83'	Stadium: Shaheed Bir Sreshtho Flight Lt. Matiur Rahman Stadium; Referee: Bituraj Barua

=== Federation Cup ===
==== Group stages ====
Pos	Team	Pld	W	D	L	GF	GA	GD	Pts	Qualification
1	Abahani Limited Dhaka	2	2	0	0	4	3	+1	6	Advance to knockout phase
2	Sheikh Russel KC	2	1	0	1	4	3	+1	3	Advance to knockout phase
3	Bangladesh Police FC	2	0	0	2	0	2	−2	0	

Source: Footystats
Rules for classification: Group stage tiebreakers

3 January 2023	Bangladesh Police FC	0–1	Dhaka Abahani	Munshigonj
14:45 BST (UTC+6)	Mohammed Shamim Ahmed (yellow card) 3'; Almazbek Malikov (yellow card) 27'	Report	Monjurur 41' (o.g.)	Stadium: Shaheed Bir Sreshtho Flight Lt. Matiur Rahman Stadium; Referee: Bhubon Mohon Tarafder

24 January 2023	Bangladesh Police FC	0–1	Sheikh Russel KC	Munshigonj
15:00 BST (UTC+6)	Arifur Rahman Raju (yellow card) 28'; Rasel Hossain (yellow card) 89'	Report	Nihat Jaman Ucchash 76'	Stadium: Shaheed Bir Sreshtho Flight Lt. Matiur Rahman Stadium; Referee: Md Jalal Uddin

=== Independence Cup ===
==== Group stages ====
Pos	Team	Pld	W	D	L	GF	GA	GD	Pts	Qualification
1	Police FC	3	2	1	0	9	5	+4	7	Advance to Knockout stage
2	Sheikh Jamal DC	3	1	1	1	8	6	+2	4	Advance to Knockout stage
3	Rahmatganj MFS	3	1	1	1	6	7	−1	4	
4	BFF Elite Academy	3	0	1	2	2	7	−5	1	

Source: GSA

16 November 2022	Rahmatganj MFS	1–4	Bangladesh Police FC	Munshigonj
14:00 BST (UTC+6)	Abdullah 84' (pen.)	Report	Joyonto 4'; Bablu 10', 16'; Faysal 88'	Stadium: Munshigonj District Stadium; Referee: Md Anisur Rahman Sagor

20 November 2022	BFF Elite Academy	1–1	Bangladesh Police FC	Munshigonj
13:00 BST (UTC+6)	Mirajul 40'	Report	Morillo 34'	Stadium: Munshigonj District Stadium; Referee: Bhubon Mohon Torafder

24 November 2022	Bangladesh Police FC	4–3	Sheikh Jamal DC	Gopalganj
13:00 BST (UTC+6)	Kirmine 9'; Bablu 22'; Malikov 37' (pen.); Hernandez 57'	Report	Stewart 37', 43'; Rasel 76' (o.g.)	Stadium: Sheikh Fazlul Haque Mani Stadium; Referee: Md Alamgir Sarker

==== Knockout stages ====
27 November 2021 Quarter-finals	Bangladesh Police FC	5–4 (a.e.t.)	Muktijoddha Sangsad KC	Comilla
13:00 BST (UTC+6)	Bablu 16'; Morillo 33'; Hernandez 81'; Malikov 86' (pen.); Eshanur 120'	Report	Emmanuel 45'; Ndikuma 55', 70'; Al Amin 90+3' (o.g.)	Stadium: Comilla District Stadium; Referee: Bituraj Barua

4 December 2022 Third-place	Dhaka Abahani	4–1	Bangladesh Police FC	Munshigonj
13:00 BST (UTC+6)	Colindres 4'; Yousef 39'; Emon 76'; Getterson 85'	Report	Rasel 43'	Stadium: Munshigonj District Stadium; Referee: Bituraj Barua

=== Statistics ===
==== Goalscorers ====
Rank	Player	Position	Total	BPL	Independence Cup	Federation Cup
1	(Venezuela) Edward Morillo	MF	10	8	2	0
2	(Colombia) Johan Arango	MF	7	7	0	0
3	(Bangladesh) M S Bablu	FW	6	2	4	0
4	(Panama) José Alexander Hernandez	FW	4	2	2	0
4	(Kyrgyzstan) Almazbek Malikov	DF	4	2	2	0
4	(Colombia) Mateo Palacios	MF	4	4	0	0
5	(Bangladesh) Rabiul Hasan	MF	3	3	0	0
6	(Bangladesh) Shahed Miah	FW	2	2	0	0
6	(Bangladesh) Joyanto Kumar Roy	DF	2	1	1	0
6	(Bangladesh) Mohammad Abdullah	MF	2	2	0	0
7	(Bangladesh) Isa Faysal	DF	1	0	1	0
7	(Bangladesh) Syed Shah Quazem Kirmane	MF	1	0	1	0
7	(Bangladesh) Esanur Rahman	DF	1	0	1	0
7	(Bangladesh) Md Rasel Hossain	DF	1	0	1	0
7	(Bangladesh) Zillur Rahman	FW	1	1	0	0
Total			54	39	15	0

Source: Matches
