= 2023–24 Federation Cup (Bangladesh) =

35th season of the Bangladesh Federation Cup

Tournament details
- Host country: Bangladesh
- City: 3
- Dates: 26 December 2023 –22 May 2024
- Teams: 10
- Venues: 3 (in 3 host cities)

Final positions
- Champions: Bashundhara Kings (3rd title)
- Runners-up: Mohammedan SC

Tournament statistics
- Matches played: 19
- Goals scored: 61 (3.21 per match)
- Top scorer(s): (Brazil) Washington Brandão (Abahani Limited Dhaka) (5 goals)
- Best player(s): (Brazil) Robson Azevedo (Bashundhara Kings)
- Best goalkeeper: (Bangladesh) Mehedi Hasan Srabon (Bashundhara Kings)
- Fair play award: Abahani Limited Dhaka

The 2023–24 Federation Cup (also known as ABG Bashundhara Federation Cup 2023–24 for sponsorship reasons) was the 35th edition of the tournament, the main domestic annual top-tier club football competition in Bangladesh organized by Bangladesh Football Federation (BFF). Ten participants were participated in the tournament. It was played from 26 December 2023 to 22 May 2024.

Bashundhara Kings is the defending champions having defeated Mohammedan SC by 2–1 goals in the final on 22 May 2024.

== Participating teams ==
The following eleven teams will take part in the tournament.

Team	Appearances	Previous best performance
Bangladesh Police FC	5th	Runners-up (1975)
Bashundhara Kings	5th	Champions (2019–20, 2020–21)
Brothers Union	33rd	Champions (1980, 1991, 2005)
Chittagong Abahani	13th	Runners-up (2017)
Abahani Limited Dhaka	35th	Champions (1982, 1985, 1986, 1988, 1997, 1999, 2000, 2010, 2016, 2017, 2018, 2021–22)
Mohammedan SC	35th	Champions (1980, 1981, 1982, 1983, 1987, 1989, 1995, 2002, 2008, 2009, 2022–23)
Fortis FC	2nd	Group stages (2022–23)
Rahmatganj MFS	35th	Runners-up (2019–20, 2021–22)
Sheikh Russel KC	28	Champions (2012)
Sheikh Jamal DC	13th	Champions (2011-12, 2013, 2015)

== Venues ==
The matches were being played following these four venues.

Munshigonj	Mymensingh
Shaheed Bir Sreshtho Flight Lt. Matiur Rahman Stadium	Rafiq Uddin Bhuiyan Stadium
Capacity: 10,000	Capacity: 15,000
Location of the stadiums of 2023–24 Federation Cup (Bangladesh)
Gopalganj	Dhaka
Sheikh Fazlul Haque Mani Stadium	Bashundhara Kings Arena
Capacity: 5,000	Capacity: 14,000

== Draw ==
The draw ceremony were held on 20 December 2023 at 3rd floor of BFF house Motijheel, Dhaka. There are ten team was divided into two groups. Top two teams from each group and two best runners-up was through in the Knockout stage.

== Group summary ==
Group A	Group B	Group C
Bangladesh Police FC	Dhaka Abahani	Bashundhara Kings
Sheikh Jamal DC	Dhaka Mohammedan	Sheikh Russel KC
Rahmatganj MFS	Chittagong Abahani	Fortis FC
	Brothers Union	

== Round Matches Dates ==
Phase	Date
Group stages	26 December 2023 – 13 February 2024
Quarter-finals	2–30 April 2024
Semi-finals	7–14 May 2024
Final	22 May 2024

== Match officials ==
Referees

- (Bangladesh) Md Mizanur Rahman
- (Bangladesh) Md Anisur Rahman Sagor
- (Bangladesh) Md Nasir Uddin
- (Bangladesh) Jashim Akther
- (Bangladesh) Bituraj Barua
- (Bangladesh) Md Alamgir Sarker (†)
- (Bangladesh) Sabuj Das
- (Bangladesh) Golam Mourshed Chowdhury Nayon
- (Bangladesh) Jasim Akhter
- (Bangladesh) Saymoon Hasan Sany (†)

Assistant Referees

- (Bangladesh) Bikash Sarker
- (Bangladesh) Md Khorshed Islam
- (Bangladesh) Sharifuzzaman Tipu
- (Bangladesh) Md Nazmul Huda
- (Bangladesh) Mehedi Hasan Emon
- (Bangladesh) Sujoy Barua
- (Bangladesh) Md Monir Ahmmad Dhali
- (Bangladesh) Md Nuruzzaman
- (Bangladesh) Jashim Akter (†)
- (Bangladesh) Md Kamruzzaman
- (Bangladesh) Md Alamgir Sarker

(†): working as both referee and assistant

== Group stages ==
Key to colours in group tables
Group winners, runners-ups and two best third-placed teams will advance to the Knockout-stage.

Tiebreakers

Teams were ranked according to points (3 points for a win, 1 point for a draw, 0 points for a loss), and if tied on points, the following tie-breaking criteria were applied, in the order given, to determine the rankings.

1. Points in head-to-head matches among tied teams;
2. Goal difference in head-to-head matches among tied teams;
3. Goals scored in head-to-head matches among tied teams;
4. If more than two teams are tied, and after applying all head-to-head criteria above, a subset of teams are still tied, all head-to-head criteria above are reapplied exclusively to this subset of teams;
5. Goal difference in all group matches;
6. Goals scored in all group matches;
7. Penalty shoot-out if only two teams were tied and they met in the last round of the group;
8. Disciplinary points (yellow card = 1 point, red card as a result of two yellow cards = 3 points, direct red card = 3 points, yellow card followed by direct red card = 4 points);
9. Drawing of lots.

=== Group A ===
Pos	Team	Pld	W	D	L	GF	GA	GD	Pts	Qualification
1	Sheikh Jamal DC	2	1	1	0	6	3	+3	4	Advance to Knockout stage
2	Bangladesh Police FC	2	0	2	0	4	4	0	2	Advance to Knockout stage
3	Rahmatganj MFS	2	0	1	1	3	6	−3	1	Qualified as a best third place team to Knockout stage

Source: Soccerway
Rules for classification: Group stages tiebreakers
26 December 2023
14:00

Rahmatganj MFS	2–2	Bangladesh Police FC
Samuel Mensah Konney 41'; Boateng 77' (pen.)	Report	Sahed Miah 19'; Edis Ibargüen García 68' (pen.)

Shaheed Bir Sreshtho Flight Lieutenant Matiur Rahman Stadium, Munshigonj
Referee: Md Mizanur Rahman

23 January 2024
14:45

Rahmatganj MFS	1–4	Sheikh Jamal DC
Ceesay 90+2' (pen.)	Report	Dimgba 19'; Fahim 31', 90+4'; Sazzad 86'

Bashundhara Kings Arena, Dhaka
Referee: Bituraj Barua

6 February 2024
15:00

Sheikh Jamal DC	2–2	Bangladesh Police FC
Abdullah 23'; Dimgba 39' (pen.)	Report	Edis Ibargüen García 25'; Kirmane 31'

Sheikh Fazlul Haque Mani Stadium, Gopalganj
Referee: Md Nasir Uddin

=== Group B ===
Pos	Team	Pld	W	D	L	GF	GA	GD	Pts	Qualification
1	Mohammedan SC	3	3	0	0	6	3	+3	9	Advance to Knockout stage
2	Abahani Limited Dhaka	3	2	0	1	10	2	+8	6	Advance to Knockout stage
3	Chittagong Abahani	3	1	0	2	4	5	−1	3	
4	Brothers Union	3	0	0	3	1	11	−10	0	

Source: Soccerway
Rules for classification: Group stages tiebreakers
16 January 2024
14:45

Brothers Union	0–6	Abahani Limited Dhaka
	Report	Jibon 17'; Brandāo 31', 72', 73'; Stewart 83', 86'

Bashundhara Kings Arena, Dhaka
Referee: Sabuj Das
16 January 2024
14:45

Mohammedan SC	2–1	Chittagong Abahani
Jafar 45+3'; Muzaffarov 55'	Report	Azeez 13'

Sheikh Fazlul Haque Mani Stadium, Gopalganj
Referee: Saymoon Hasan Sany

30 January 2024
14:45

Mohammedan SC	2–1	Brothers Union
Sourav Dewan 66'; Jafar 85'	Report	Otabek 69'

Sheikh Fazlul Haque Mani Stadium, Gopalganj
Referee: Md Anisur Rahman Sagor
30 January 2024
14:45

Abahani Limited Dhaka	3–0	Chittagong Abahani
Bruninho 43'; Emeka 47'; Brandāo 83'	Report

Bashundhara Kings Arena, Dhaka
Referee: Md Jashim Akther

13 February 2024
15:00

Abahani Limited Dhaka	1–2	Mohammedan SC
Stewart 38'	Report	Sunday 51', 55'

Sheikh Fazlul Haque Mani Stadium, Gopalganj
Referee: Bituraj Barua
13 February 2024
15:00

Chittagong Abahani	3–0	Brothers Union
Shakil Ali 8', 20'; Amiruzzaman Saymon 72'	Report

Shaheed Bir Sreshtho Flight Lieutenant Matiur Rahman Stadium, Munshigonj
Referee: MD Jalal Uddin

=== Group C ===
Pos	Team	Pld	W	D	L	GF	GA	GD	Pts	Qualification
1	Bashundhara Kings	2	2	0	0	2	0	+2	6	Advance to Knockout stage
2	Fortis FC	2	1	0	1	3	2	+1	3	Advance to Knockout stage
3	Sheikh Russel KC	2	0	0	2	1	4	−3	0	Qualified as a best third place team to knockout stage

Source: Soccerway
Rules for classification: Group stages tiebreakers
26 December 2023
14:00

Bashundhara Kings	1–0	Fortis FC
Dorielton 11'	Report

Sheikh Fazlul Haque Mani Stadium, Gopalganj
Referee: Md Anisur Rahman Sagor

23 January 2024
14:45

Fortis FC	3–1	Sheikh Russel KC
Babou 10' (pen.), 72'; Amir Hakim Bappy 51'	Report	Landry 69'

Shaheed Bir Sreshtho Flight Lieutenant Matiur Rahman Stadium, Munshigonj
Referee: Md Alamgir Sarker

6 February 2024
15:00

Sheikh Russel KC	0–1	Bashundhara Kings
	Report	Asror Gafurov 36'

Shaheed Bir Sreshtho Flight Lieutenant Matiur Rahman Stadium, Munshigonj
Referee: Md Alamgir Sarker

=== Ranking of third-placed teams ===
Due to groups having different numbers of teams, the results against the fourth-placed teams in four-team groups are considered null and void for this ranking.

Pos	Grp	Team	Pld	W	D	L	GF	GA	GD	Pts	Qualification
1	A	Rahmatganj MFS	2	0	1	1	3	6	−3	1	Knockout phase
2	C	Sheikh Russel KC	2	0	0	2	1	4	−3	0	Knockout phase
3	B	Chittagong Abahani	2	0	0	2	1	5	−4	0	

Source: Group stage
Rules for classification: 1) points; 2) goal difference; 3) goals scored; 4) disciplinary points; 5) drawing of lots.

== Knockout stage ==
- In the knockout stages, if a match finished goalless at the end of normal playing time, extra time would have been played (two periods of 15 minutes each) and followed, if necessary, by a penalty shoot-out to determine the winner.

=== Bracket ===
Quarter-finals
2 April–Gopalganj
Mohammedan SC	2
Sheikh Russel KC	1
23 April–Gopalganj
Sheikh Jamal DC	0
Bangladesh Police FC	3
16 April–Gopalganj
Bashundhara Kings	2
Rahmatganj MFS	0
30 April–Dhaka
Abahani Limited Dhaka	3
Fortis FC	1

Semi-finals
7 May–Munshigonj
Mohammedan SC	2
Bangladesh Police FC	1
14 May–Munshigonj
Bashundhara Kings	3
Abahani Limited Dhaka	0

Final
22 May–Mymensingh
Mohammedan SC	1
Bashundhara Kings (a.e.t.)	2

=== Quarter-finals ===
2 April 2024
15:00

Mohammedan SC	2–1	Sheikh Russel KC
Muzaffarov 71'; Jafar 90+1'	Report	Sekou Sylla 1'

Sheikh Fazlul Haque Mani Stadium, Gopalganj
Referee: Bituraj Barua

16 April 2024
15:00

Bashundhara Kings	2–0	Rahmatganj MFS
Sohel 24'; Mfon 62'	Report

Sheikh Fazlul Haque Mani Stadium, Gopalganj
Referee: Golam Mourshed Chowdhury Nayon

23 April 2024
15:00

Sheikh Jamal DC	0–3	Bangladesh Police FC
	Report	Sokhibov 2'; Kirmane 8'; Abdullaev Azamat 23'

Sheikh Fazlul Haque Mani Stadium, Gopalganj
Referee: Md Jalal Uddin

30 April 2024
15:00

Fortis FC	1–3	Abahani Limited Dhaka
Sajed Hasan Jummon Nijum 90+7'	Report	Stewart 9'; Brandão 45+2'; Fernandes 79'

Bashundhara Kings Arena, Dhaka
Referee: Md Mizanur Rahman

=== Semi-finals ===
7 May 2024
15:00

Mohammedan SC	2–1	Bangladesh Police FC
Sunday 68'; Emon 79'	Report	Akhrorbek Uktamov 47'

Shaheed Bir Sreshtho Flight Lieutenant Matiur Rahman Stadium, Munshigonj
Referee: Saymoon Hasan Sany

14 May 2024
15:00

Bashundhara Kings	3–0	Abahani Limited Dhaka
Robinho 21'; Dorielton 71'; Ibrahim 90+7'	Report

Sheikh Fazlul Haque Mani Stadium, Gopalganj
Referee: Anisur Rahman Sagor

=== Final ===
22 May 2024
15:00

Mohammedan SC	1–2 (a.e.t.)	Bashundhara Kings
Sunday 63'	Report	Figueira 87'; Jahid 105'

Rafiq Uddin Bhuiyan Stadium, Mymensingh
Attendance: 10,000
Referee: Jasim Akhter

== Winners ==
35th Federation Cup (Bangladesh) 2023–24
Winners
Bashundhara Kings
3rd Title

== Statistics ==
=== Goalscorers ===
There have been 61 goals scored in 19 matches, for an average of 3.21 goals per match. Source: Soccerway

5 Goals

- (Brazil) Washington Brandão (Abahani Limited Dhaka)

4 Goals

- (Saint Vincent and the Grenadines) Cornelius Stewart (Abahani Limited Dhaka)
- (Nigeria) Sunday Emmanuel (Mohammedan SC)

3 Goals

- (Bangladesh) Jafar Iqbal (Mohammedan SC)

2 Goals

- (Uzbekistan) Muzaffar Muzaffarov (Mohammedan SC)
- (Brazil) Dorielton Gomes (Bashundhara Kings)
- (Bangladesh) Shakil Ali (Chittagong Abahani)
- (Bangladesh) Foysal Ahmed Fahim (Sheikh Jamal DC)
- (Nigeria) Stanley Dimgba (Sheikh Jamal DC)
- (The Gambia) Pa Omar Babou (Fortis FC)
- (Colombia) Edis Ibargüen García (Bangladesh Police FC)
- Syed Shah Quazem Kirmane (Bangladesh Police FC)

1 Goal

- (Brazil) Miguel Figueira (Bashundhara Kings)
- (Nigeria) Abu Azeez (Chittagong Abahani)
- (Bangladesh) Amiruzzaman Saymon (Chittagong Abahani)
- (Bangladesh) Mohammad Abdullah (Sheikh Jamal DC)
- (Bangladesh) Sazzad Hossain (Sheikh Jamal DC)
- (Bangladesh) Shahriar Emon (Mohammedan SC)
- (Bangladesh) Sourav Dewan (Mohammedan SC)
- (Bangladesh) Nabib Newaj Jibon (Abahani Limited Dhaka)
- (Brazil) Bruninho Goncalves Rocha (Abahani Limited Dhaka)
- (Brazil) Jonathan Fernandes (Abahani Limited Dhaka)
- (Nigeria) Emeka Ogbugh (Abahani Limited Dhaka)
- (Bangladesh) Jahid Hasan (Bashundhara Kings)
- (Bangladesh) Sohel Rana (Bashundhara Kings)
- (Nigeria) Mfon Udoh (Bashundhara Kings)
- (Uzbekistan) Asror Gafurov (Bashundhara Kings)
- (Brazil) Robinho Azevedo (Bashundhara Kings)
- (Bangladesh) Mohammad Ibrahim (Bashundhara Kings)
- (Uzbekistan) Otabek Valizhonov (Brothers Union)
- (Bangladesh) Sajed Hasan Jummon Nijum (Fortis FC)
- (Bangladesh) Amir Hakim Bappy (Fortis FC)
- (Ghana) Ernest Boateng (Rahmatganj MFS)
- (The Gambia) Dawda Ceesay (Rahmatganj MFS)
- (Ghana) Samuel Mensah Konney (Rahmatganj MFS)
- (Guinea) Sekou Sylla (Sheikh Russel KC)
- (Burundi) Landry Ndikumana (Sheikh Russel KC)
- Sahed Miah (Bangladesh Police FC)
- (Uzbekistan) Javokhir Sokhibov (Bangladesh Police FC)
- (Uzbekistan) Abdullaev Azamat (Bangladesh Police FC)
- (Uzbekistan) Akhrorbek Uktamov (Bangladesh Police FC)

=== Hat-tricks ===
† Bold Club indicates winner of the match

Player	For	Against	Result	Date	Ref
(Brazil) Washington Brandão	Abahani Limited Dhaka	Brothers Union	6–0	16 January 2024	

== Individual awards ==
=== Man of the match ===
- Washington Brandão won the most Man of the match awards.(3)

† Bold club indicates winner of the match

- Group Stage

Round	Group	Player	Club	Opponent
1	A	(Ghana) Samuel Mensah Konney	Rahmatganj MFS	Bangladesh Police FC
1	B	(Brazil) Washington Brandão	Dhaka Abahani	Brothers Union
1	B	(Uzbekistan) Muzaffar Muzaffarov	Mohammedan SC	Chittagong Abahani
1	C	(Brazil) Dorielton Gomes	Bashundhara Kings	Fortis FC
2	A	(Bangladesh) Foysal Ahmed Fahim	Sheikh Jamal DC	Rahmatganj MFS
2	B	(Brazil) Washington Brandão	Dhaka Abahani	Chittagong Abahani
2	B	(Bangladesh) Jafar Iqbal	Mohammedan SC	Brothers Union
2	C	(The Gambia) Pa Omar Babou	Fortis FC	Sheikh Russel KC
3	A	(Colombia) Edis Ibargüen García	Bangladesh Police FC	Sheikh Jamal DC
3	B	(Nigeria) Sunday Emmanuel	Mohammedan SC	Dhaka Abahani
3	B	(Bangladesh) Shakil Ali	Chittagong Abahani	Brothers Union
3	C	(Uzbekistan) Asror Gafurov	Bashundhara Kings	Sheikh Russel KC

- Knockout Stage

Round	Player	Club	Opponent	Date
Quarter-Final	(Uzbekistan) Muzaffar Muzaffarov	Mohammedan SC	Sheikh Russell KC	2 April 2024
Quarter-Final	(Brazil) Robinho Azevedo	Bashundhara Kings	Rahmatganj MFS	16 April 2024
Quarter-Final	(Venezuela) Edward Morillo	Bangladesh Police FC	Sheikh Jamal DC	23 April 2024
Quarter-Final	(Brazil) Washington Brandão	Dhaka Abahani	Fortis FC	30 April 2024
Semi-Final	(Bangladesh) Shahriar Emon	Mohammedan SC	Bangladesh Police FC	7 May 2024
Semi-Final	(Brazil) Robinho Azevedo	Bashundhara Kings	Dhaka Abahani	14 May 2024
Final	(Brazil) Miguel Figueira	Bashundhara Kings	Mohammedan SC	22 May 2024

== Best Player Awards ==
Best Player	Top Goalscorer	Best Goalkeeper	Fair Play Award
(Brazil) Robson Azevedo (Bashundhara Kings)	(Brazil) Washington Brandão (Abahani Limited Dhaka)	(Bangladesh) Mehedi Hasan Srabon (Bashundhara Kings)	Abahani Limited Dhaka

== See also ==
- 2023–24 Independence Cup (Bangladesh)
