= Halim Shah =

Bangladeshi cricketer (born 1973)

Cricket information
- Batting: Right-handed
- Bowling: Right arm off break

Career statistics
Competition	First-class	List A
Matches	40	25
Runs scored	1,482	448
Batting average	25.55	23.57
100s/50s	2/7	0/0
Top score	161*	41*
Balls bowled	294	42
Wickets	0	0
Bowling average	–	–
5 wickets in innings	–	–
10 wickets in match	–	–
Best bowling	–	–
Catches/stumpings	26/–	8/–
- Source: CricketArchive, 30 December 2021

Sayed Abdul Halim Shah (born 1 January 1973) is a First-class and List A cricketer from Bangladesh. He was a star with the Bangladesh U-19 side in the late 1980s. He failed to fulfill his early promise of a glorious international career but he was a highly respected cricketer in the domestic arena.

He made his first-class debut for Dhaka Metropolis in the 2000/01 season. He then played for Dhaka Division from 2001/02 to 2004/05. A right-handed batsman and occasional off-break bowler he scored 2 first-class hundreds and 7 fifties, with a best of 161* against Barisal Division.

His son, Syed Shah Quazem, is a professional footballer.
