= Mohammad Emon =

Bangladeshi footballer

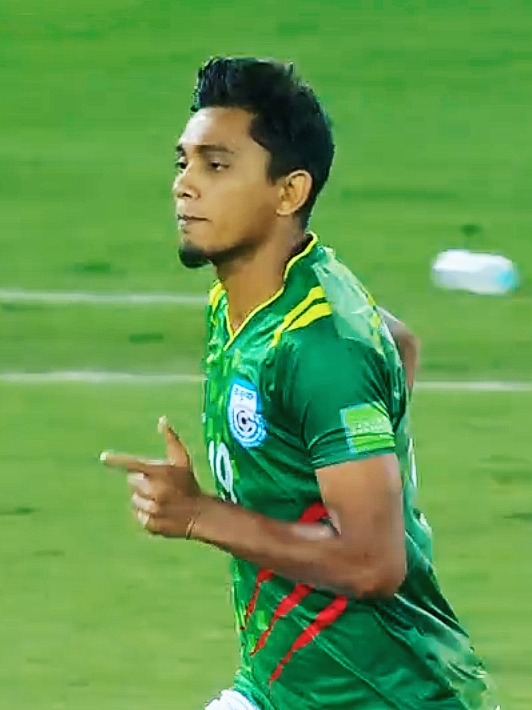
- Emon with Bangladesh in 2022 FIFA World Cup Qualification

Personal information
- Full name: Mohammad Emon
- Date of birth: 10 July 1997 (age 29)
- Place of birth: Narayanganj, Bangladesh
- Height: 1.80 m (5 ft 11 in)
- Position: Defender

Team information
- Current team: Dhaka Wanderers
- Number: 4

Senior career*
Years	Team	Apps	(Gls)
2017–2018	T&T Club Motijheel	18	(0)
2018–2021	Muktijoddha Sangsad	22	(0)
2021–2022	Sheikh Russel KC	0	(0)
2022–2023	Sheikh Jamal DC	3	(0)
2023–2024	Bangladesh Police	11	(0)
2024–	Dhaka Wanderers	0	(0)

International career^{‡}
2015	Bangladesh U19	3	(0)
2021–	Bangladesh	2	(0)
- * Club domestic league appearances and goals as of 24 May 2024 ‡ National team caps and goals as of 15 June 2021

Mohammad Emon (Bengali: মোহাম্মদ ইমন) is a Bangladeshi footballer who plays as a centre back or right back for Bangladesh Premier League club Dhaka Wanderers and the Bangladesh national team.

Emon also represented Bangladesh U19 in 2016 AFC U-19 Championship qualification. His childhood idol is World Cup winning defender Sergio Ramos, who also plays as a centre back.

== International career ==
=== Youth ===
In October 2015, Emon played in 2016 AFC U-16 Championship qualification for Bangladesh U19 national team. He started Bangladesh's all the three matches in the tournament.

=== Senior ===
On 9 March 2021, Emon received his first senior national team call-up ahead of Three Nations Cup tournament in Nepal. On 27 March, he started against Nepal in a 0–0 draw and made his international debut.
