= Johan Arango =

Colombian footballer (born 1991)

Personal information
- Full name: Johan Leandro Arango Ambuila
- Date of birth: 5 February 1991 (age 35)
- Place of birth: Cali, Colombia
- Height: 1.82 m (6 ft 0 in)
- Positions: Midfielder; forward

Team information
- Current team: Inter de Palmira FC
- Number: 16

Senior career*
Years	Team	Apps	(Gls)
2009–2012	América de Cali	5	(0)
2011	→ Dépor (loan)	11	(2)
2011	→ Deportes Quindío (loan)	0	(0)
2012	→ Universitario Popayán (loan)	3	(0)
2013	Uniautónoma	21	(3)
2014–2016	Once Caldas	62	(21)
2016	→ Independiente Medellín (loan)	12	(1)
2016	Deportivo Pasto	16	(6)
2017	Santa Fe	12	(2)
2017	Once Caldas	14	(2)
2017–2018	Juárez	7	(0)
2018–2019	Al-Batin	11	(1)
2019	Santa Fe	14	(3)
2019	Correcaminos UAT	9	(0)
2020–2022	Binacional	42	(14)
2022	Jaguares FC	5	(0)
2023–	Bangladesh Police FC	8	(7)
2025	Inter de Palmira FC		
- * Club domestic league appearances and goals as of 27 March 2023 (UTC)

Johan Arango (born 5 February 1991) is a Colombian professional footballer who plays as a winger for Bangladesh Premier League club Bangladesh Police FC.

== International career ==
José Pékerman called up Arango for a training squad with the senior team of Colombia in February 2016.
