= Mustafa Yusupov =

Kyrgyzstani association football player

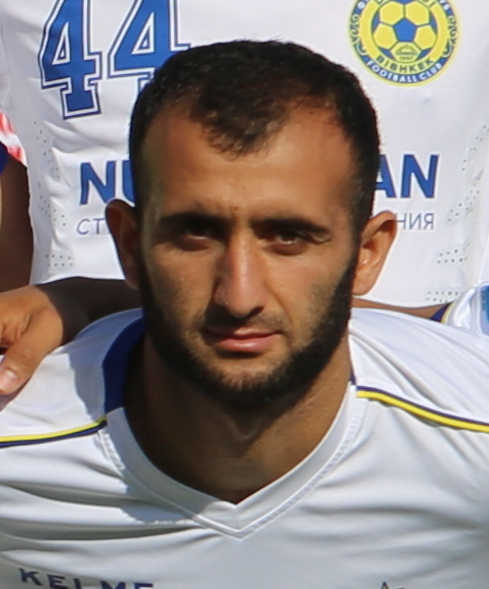

Personal information
- Full name: Mustafa Gurugliyevich Yusupov
- Date of birth: 1 July 1995 (age 31)
- Place of birth: Kara-Döbö, Kyrgyzstan
- Height: 1.76 m (5 ft 9 in)
- Position: Defender

Team information
- Current team: Neftchi Kochkor-Ata
- Number: 4

Senior career*
Years	Team	Apps	(Gls)
2013–2021	Dordoi Bishkek		
2014–2015	→ Ala-Too Naryn (loan)		
2022	Kedah Darul Aman	0	(0)
2023–2024	Bangladesh Police	5	(0)
2024	Alga Bishkek		
2025–	Neftchi Kochkor-Ata		

International career^{‡}
2014–2017	Kyrgyzstan U21	12	(0)
2018	Kyrgyzstan U23	3	(0)
2018–	Kyrgyzstan	13	(0)
- * Club domestic league appearances and goals as of 29 July 2021 ‡ National team caps and goals as of 29 July 2021

Mustafa Gurugliyevich Yusupov (Kyrgyz: Мустафа Юсупов; Russian: Мустафа Гуруглиевич Юсупов; born 1 July 1995) is a Kyrgyzstani footballer who plays as a defender for the Neftchi Kochkor-Ata and Kyrgyzstan national team.

== Career ==
=== Club ===
Yusupov was loaned to Ala-Too Naryn for the 2014–15 season. He won the Kyrgyzstan League in 2014 and 2018.

On 29 July 2021, Yusupov was released from his contract by Dordoi Bishkek.

=== International ===
Yusupov made his debut for Kyrgyzstan national football team in a friendly match on 29 May 2018, against Azerbaijan. He was included in Kyrgyzstan's squad for the 2019 AFC Asian Cup in the United Arab Emirates.

== Career statistics ==
=== International ===
As of match played 11 June 2021

Kyrgyzstan national team
Year	Apps	Goals
2018	6	0
2019	5	0
2020	0	0
2021	2	0
Total	13	0

== Honours ==
Dordoi Bishkek

- Kyrgyz Premier League: 2018, 2019, 2020
- Kyrgyzstan Cup: 2016, 2017, 2018
- Kyrgyzstan Super Cup: 2019, 2021
