= M. S. Bablu =

Bangladeshi footballer

Personal information
- Full name: Mathiws Bablu
- Date of birth: 27 November 1997 (age 28)
- Place of birth: Dinajpur, Bangladesh
- Height: 1.75 m (5 ft 9 in)
- Positions: Left winger; right winger

Team information
- Current team: Bangladesh Police
- Number: 7

Youth career
- 2013–2014: Sheikh Jamal

Senior career*
Years	Team	Apps	(Gls)
2015–2016	BJMC	?	(?)
2018–2019	Bangladesh Police	?	(1)
2019–	Bangladesh Police	79	(13)
- * Club domestic league appearances and goals as of 24 October 2026

Mathiws Bablu (Bengali: ম্যাথিউস বাবলু; born 27 November 1997), commonly referred to as M. S. Bablu, is a Bangladeshi professional footballer who plays as a winger for Bangladesh Football League club Bangladesh Police FC.

== Early career ==
Bablu hails from a Santal family of Dinajpur, Bangladesh. His father died when he was only 14, forcing him to take on household responsibilities, and in 2012 he earned the opportunity to come to Dhaka after successfully training with the BFF Academy consisting of BKSP students, located in Sylhet, which eventually was shut down. Bablu spent the following two years training at the Sheikh Jamal DC Academy. In 2014, he represented the corporate-owned Team BJMC at the BFF U-18 Football Tournament, and was promoted to the club's senior team the following year.

== Club career ==
=== Team BJMC ===
Following his promotion to the senior team of Team BJMC, Bablu made his professional league debut during the 2014–15 Premier League with The Jutemen. He spent two years at the club, mainly spending time on the bench or coming on as a substitute.

=== Bangladesh Police FC ===
In 2017, Bablu took up a job as a constable in the Bangladesh Police and the following year, began representing Bangladesh Police FC in the second-tier. In his debut season at the club, Police became champions of the 2018–19 Championship League. Bablu's lone goal that season came in a 1–0 victory over Victoria SC on 27 February 2019. In the 2019–20 Federation Cup, he scored in the quarter-final against Saif SC in a 3–1 victory, on 31 December 2019. He scored his first top-tier league goal in a 1–1 draw against Brothers Union on 6 March 2020, during the eventually abandoned 2020–21 Premier League. On 24 May 2024, Bablu scored a late equaliser in a 1–1 draw against Abahani Limited Dhaka in a 2023–24 Premier League match held at the Sheikh Fazlul Haque Mani Stadium in Gopalganj.

== International career ==
In July 2020, Bablu was called up to the Bangladesh national team camp by coach Jamie Day. Although, he tested positive for COVID-19, the following month, he recovered in time to be included in the team as an unused substitute during two friendly matches against Nepal held on home soil, in November 2020. Bablu was also an unused substitute during a 0–5 defeat to Qatar in Doha at the 2022 FIFA World Cup qualification – AFC second round, on 4 December 2020.
