= Isa Faysal =

Bangladeshi footballer (born 1999)

Personal information
- Full name: Mohammed Isa Faysal
- Date of birth: 20 August 1999 (age 27)
- Place of birth: Rangpur, Bangladesh
- Height: 1.73 m (5 ft 8 in)
- Position: Left-back

Team information
- Current team: Bangladesh Police
- Number: 17

Senior career*
Years	Team	Apps	(Gls)
2016–2017	Bangladesh Police		(0)
2017–2018	Muktijoddha Sangsad	3	(0)
2018–	Bangladesh Police	127	(1)

International career^{‡}
2017	Bangladesh U20	1	(0)
2023	Bangladesh U23	3	(0)
2023–	Bangladesh	15	(0)
Medal record
Representing Bangladesh
SAFF U-20 Championship
Runner-up	2017 Bhutan	Team
- * Club domestic league appearances and goals as of 13 March 2026 ‡ National team caps and goals as of 16 November 2024

Isa Faysal (Bengali: ইসা ফয়সাল, Bengali pronunciation: [isa fɔe̯sal]; born 20 August 1999) is a Bangladeshi professional footballer who plays as a left-back for Bangladesh Football League club Bangladesh Police and the Bangladesh national team.

== Club career ==
In 2016, Isa played for Rangpur District in the Under-18 District Football League. Later that year, he moved to Dhaka with the help of Coach Altab Hossain and joined the Bangladesh Police as a constable-cum-player.

On 15 May 2019, Isa scored his first goal for the club in a 2–2 draw against Swadhinata KS in the 2018–19 Bangladesh Championship League. He was appointed captain from the 2023–24 season, which was the club's fifth season in the Bangladesh Premier League.

== International career ==
On 22 June 2023, Isa made his international debut for Bangladesh against Lebanon, in the 2023 SAFF Championship.

== Career statistics ==
=== Club ===
As of 30 October 2023.

Appearances and goals by club, season and competition
Club	Season	League			Domestic Cup (Note: Appearance(s) in Bangladesh Federation Cup)		Other (Note: Appearance(s) in Bangladesh Independence Cup)		Continental		Total	
Club	Season	Division	Apps	Goals	Apps	Goals	Apps	Goals	Apps	Goals	Apps	Goals
Muktijoddha Sangsad KC	2017–18	Bangladesh Football League	3	0	0	0	0	0	—		3	0
Bangladesh Police	2018–19	Bangladesh Championship League	19	1	—		—		—		19	1
Bangladesh Police	2019–20	Bangladesh Football League	5	0	4	0	—		—		9	0
Bangladesh Police	2020–21	Bangladesh Football League	19	0	1	0	—		—		20	0
Bangladesh Police	2021–22	Bangladesh Football League	20	0	1	0	5	0	—		26	0
Bangladesh Police	2022–23	Bangladesh Football League	20	0	0	0	4	1	—		24	1
Bangladesh Police	2023–24	Bangladesh Football League	0	0	0	0	1	0	—		1	0
Bangladesh Police	Bangladesh Police total		83	1	6	0	10	1	0	0	99	2
Career total			86	1	6	0	10	1	0	0	102	2

=== International ===
As of 6 June 2024.

Bangladesh
Year	Apps	Goals
2023	8	0
2024	3	0
Total	11	0

== Honours ==
Bangladesh Police

- Bangladesh Championship League: 2018–19
