= Abou Touré =

Senegalese footballer

Personal information
- Date of birth: 12 February 1996 (age 30)
- Place of birth: Senegal
- Height: 1.79 m (5 ft 10 1/2 in)
- Position: Midfielder

Team information
- Current team: Sheikh Jamal Dhanmondi
- Number: 29

Youth career
- 2014: Oeiras
- 2015: Sporting

Senior career*
Years	Team	Apps	(Gls)
2015–2016	1º Dezembro	15	(2)
2016	→ Mafra (loan)	19	(0)
2016–2017	Gil Vicente	36	(1)
2017–2019	Real	48	(3)
2019–2021	Louletano	45	(9)
2021–2022	Oriental Dragon	19	(0)
2022–2023	SC Guadalupe		
2023–2024	Gudja United	10	(3)
2024–	Sheikh Jamal Dhanmondi	7	(2)
- * Club domestic league appearances and goals as of 29 May 2024

Abou Touré (born 12 February 1996) is a Senegalese professional footballer who plays as a right winger for Sheikh Jamal Dhanmondi in Bangladesh Premier League.

== Club career ==
Touré made his debut for Mafra on January 23, 2016 against Feirense in a 1-1 draw, coming on as a substitute for Luís Carlos.

== Career statistics ==
=== Club ===
As of 18 July 2018.

Club	Season	League			Cup		Continental		Other		Total	
Club	Season	Division	Apps	Goals	Apps	Goals	Apps	Goals	Apps	Goals	Apps	Goals
1º Dezembro	2015–16	Campeonato de Portugal	15	2	0	0	–		0	0	15	2
Mafra (loan)	2015–16	LigaPro	19	0	0	0	–		0	0	19	0
Gil Vicente	2016–17	LigaPro	36	1	3 (Note: One appearance in the Taça de Portugal, two appearances in the Taça da Liga)	0	–		0	0	39	1
Real SC	2017–18	LigaPro	23	2	1 (Note: Appearances in the Taça da Liga)	0	–		0	0	24	2
Career total			93	5	4	0	0	0	0	0	97	5
