= Syed Shah Quazem Kirmane =

Bangladeshi football player (born 1998)

Quazem Shah
Personal information
- Full name: Syed Quazem Kirmanee Shah
- Date of birth: 25 October 1998 (age 28)
- Place of birth: Dhaka, Bangladesh
- Height: 1.74 m (5 ft 8 1/2 in)
- Positions: Attacking midfielder; left winger

Team information
- Current team: Bashundhara Kings
- Number: 20

College career
Years	Team	Apps	(Gls)
2017–2021	Alberta Golden Bears	30	(3)

Senior career*
Years	Team	Apps	(Gls)
2022–2025	Bangladesh Police	51	(4)
2025–2026	Dhaka Abahani	18	(2)
2026–	Bashundhara Kings	0	(0)

International career^{‡}
2024–	Bangladesh	10	(0)
- * Club domestic league appearances and goals as of 29 August 2026 ‡ National team caps and goals as of 11 November 2026

Syed Quazem Shah Kirmanee (Bengali: সৈয়দ ক্বাজেম শাহ কিরমানী, Bengali pronunciation: [soi̯jod kʷazem ʃaɦ kiɾmani]); born 25 October 1998), is a Bangladeshi professional footballer who plays as a midfielder for Bashundhara Kings in the Bangladesh Premier League and the Bangladesh national team.

== Early life ==
Quazem was born on 25 October 1998 in Dhaka, Bangladesh. His father, Halim Shah, was a first class cricketer. Quazem moved to Canada at the age of seven, where he attended Lillian Osborne High School in Edmonton.

== University career ==
Quazem began attending the University of Alberta in 2017, where he played for the men's soccer team. In his first two seasons he made a total of thirteen appearances and started only on two occasions. On 23 August 2019, he scored his first goal against the Lethbridge Pronghorns in 2–1 victory. In the same season he made eleven appearances and also managed to score twice for his team. Following his graduation in 2021, he received offers from a few professional clubs from Bangladesh.

== Club career ==
=== Bangladesh Police ===
In 2021, Quazem successfully trialed for Bangladesh Premier League club Saif SC, however, he was not able to join the team due to passport issues.

In October 2022, Quazem joined Bangladesh Premier League club Bangladesh Police FC. On 16 November 2022, he made his competitive debut for the club against Rahmatganj MFS in the 2022–23 Independence Cup. On 24 November, he scored his first professional goal during a 4–3 victory over Sheikh Jamal Dhanmondi Club. Quazem made his league debut against Mohammedan SC on 22 December. He scored his first league goal during a 7–0 victory over AFC Uttara on 20 May 2023.

=== Dhaka Abahani ===
In July 2025, Quazem completed a move to Dhaka Abahani, marking the end of his three-season spell with Bangladesh Police, where he made sixty-seven appearances in all competitions, scoring seven goals.

== International career ==
In November 2023, Quazem was included in the Bangladesh national team's 30-men preliminary squad for the 2026 FIFA World Cup qualification – AFC second round. However, on 2 November, he sustained a hamstring injury during a game against Sheikh Jamal Dhanmondi Club, which kept him out of action for almost two weeks.

Quazem made his debut for the Bangladesh national team on 11 June 2024 in a World Cup qualifier against Lebanon at the Khalifa International Stadium in Qatar. He substituted Shekh Morsalin in the 77th minute as Lebanon won 4–0.

== Career statistics ==
=== Club ===
As of 27 May 2025.

Appearances and goals by club, season and competition
Club	Season	League			Domestic Cup		Other Cup		Continental		Total	
Club	Season	Division	Apps	Goals	Apps	Goals	Apps	Goals	Apps	Goals	Apps	Goals
Bangladesh Police	2022–23	Bangladesh Premier League	17	1	1 (Note: Appearance(s) in Bangladesh Federation Cup)	0	5 (Note: Appearance(s) in Bangladesh Independence Cup)	1	–		23	2
Bangladesh Police	2023–24	Bangladesh Premier League	18	2	4	2	3	0	–		25	4
Bangladesh Police	2024–25	Bangladesh Premier League	16	1	3	0	–		–		19	1
Career total			51	4	8	2	8	1	0	0	67	7

=== International ===
As of 11 November 2026.

Appearances and goals by national team and year
National team	Year	Apps	Goals
Bangladesh
Bangladesh	2024	2	0
Bangladesh	2025	4	0
Bangladesh	2026	4	0
Total		10	0
