= Monaem Khan Raju =

Bangladeshi footballer (born 1990)

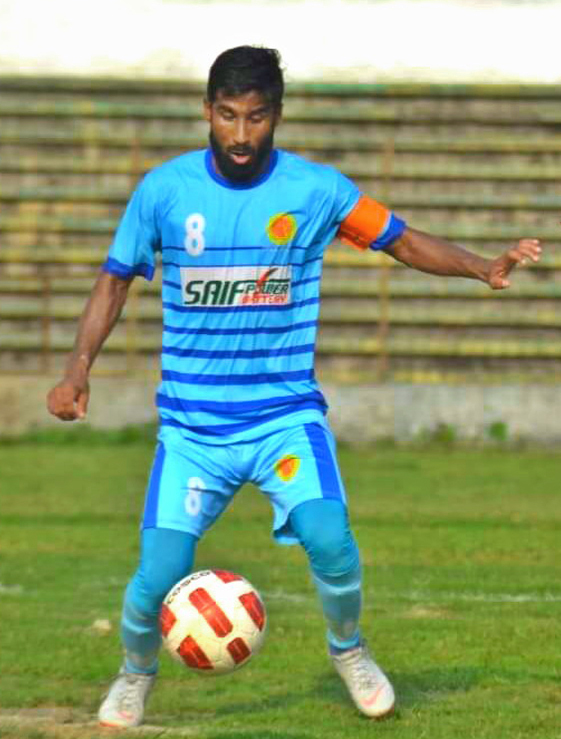

Personal information
- Full name: Monaem Khan Raju
- Date of birth: 7 July 1990 (age 36)
- Place of birth: Kishoreganj, Bangladesh
- Height: 1.63 m (5 ft 4 in)
- Position: Defensive midfielder

Senior career*
Years	Team	Apps	(Gls)
2009–2010	Feni	?	(?)
2010–2011	Sheikh Russel	?	(?)
2011–2012	Feni	?	(?)
2012–2015	Sheikh Jamal	?	(?)
2016–2018	Sheikh Russel	14	(1)
2018–2021	Chittagong Abahani	46	(0)
2021–2024	Bangladesh Police	50	(0)
2024–2025	Brothers Union	2	(0)
2025–	Dhaka Rangers	0	(0)

International career^{‡}
2011–2016	Bangladesh	23	(0)
Medal record
Men's football
Representing Bangladesh
South Asian Games
Gold medal – first place	2010 Bangladesh
- * Club domestic league appearances and goals as of 21 February 2025 ‡ National team caps and goals as of 2 June 2016

Monaem Khan Raju (Bengali: মোনায়েম খান রাজু; born 7 July 1990) is a Bangladeshi footballer who plays as a defensive midfielder for Bangladesh Championship League club Dhaka Rangers.

He represented the Bangladesh national football team between 2011 and 2016.

== Club career ==
In 2010, after his debut season with Feni SC, Raju was included in the 39-man preliminary squad for the 2010 South Asian Games by coach Zoran Đorđević. However, he did not make the final 23-man squad.

On 29 May 2011, Raju scored a brace for Sheikh Jamal Dhanmondi Club in a 2–0 victory over Arambagh KS. However, the season ended up being a disappointment for the club as they failed to retain the league title, finishing in seventh place.

On 24 May 2019, while playing for Chittagong Abahani Limited, Raju and four other local footballers were accused of match-fixing.

== International career ==
On 29 August 2013, Raju was added to the 2013 SAFF Championship squad by coach Lodewijk de Kruif, after captain Mamunul Islam and star midfielder Sohel Rana were deemed not fit enough. However, Raju's inclusion was not accepted by the South Asian Football Federation, due to him not being a member of the previously announced 30-man preliminary squad. Bangladesh Football Federation's decision of including Raju after the original squad already announced, was later heavily criticised by local media, after Bangladesh finished bottom of their group during the tournament.

On 15 January 2016, Raju was named the "Man of the Match" during Bangladesh's encounter with Nepal at the 2016 Bangabandhu Cup. However, after a goalless draw Raju expressed his disappointment during the post-match interview by stating, "This is the first time I have become the best player in an international match. A victory would have been a big achievement. But that didn't happen."

== Career statistics ==
=== International ===
As of 2 June 2016.

Bangladesh national team
Year	Apps	Goals
2011	6	0
2014	2	0
2015	11	0
2016	4	0
total	23	0
