= Stanley Dimgba =

Nigerian footballer

Personal information
- Full name: Stanley Augustine Dimgba Sopuruchi
- Date of birth: 26 March 1993 (age 33)
- Place of birth: Ilorin, Nigeria
- Height: 1.76 m (5 ft 9 in)
- Position: Forward

Senior career*
Years	Team	Apps	(Gls)
2010–2011	Plateau United		
2012–2013	Kwara United		
2014–2015	Warri Wolves		
2016	Sunshine Stars		
2017–2020	Enyimba		
2020–2022	Stellenbosch	47	(8)
2022–2023	Darnes		
2023–2024	Sheikh Jamal DC	6	(0)
2025	Abia Warriors	2	(0)
2025–	Enyimba	2	(0)

International career^{‡}
2015	Nigeria U23	2	(0)
2015	Nigeria	2	(0)
- * Club domestic league appearances and goals as of 16 March 2024 ‡ National team caps and goals as of 1 December 2020

Stanley Augustine Dimgba Sopuruchi (born March 26, 1993) is a Nigerian professional footballer who plays as a forward for Enyimba in the NPFL.
