= Ahsan Habib Bipu =

Bangladeshi footballer

Personal information
- Full name: Ahsan Habib Bipu
- Date of birth: 30 October 1990 (age 36)
- Place of birth: Chandpur, Bangladesh
- Height: 1.85 m (6 ft 1 in)
- Position: Goalkeeper

Team information
- Current team: Rahmatganj MFS
- Number: 36

Senior career*
Years	Team	Apps	(Gls)
2011	Dilkusha SC		(0)
2012–2014	Mohammedan SC		(0)
2014–2016	Feni SC		(0)
2016–2017	Arambagh KS		(0)
2017–2018	Muktijoddha Sangsad	0	(0)
2018–2023	Mohammedan SC	28	(0)
2023–2024	Bangladesh Police	17	(0)
2024–	Rahmatganj MFS	9	(0)
- * Club domestic league appearances and goals as of 20 May 2025

Ahsan Habib Bipu (Bengali: আহসান হাবিব বিপু; born 30 October 1990) is a Bangladeshi professional footballer who plays as a goalkeeper for Bangladesh Premier League club Rahmatganj MFS.

== Club career ==
Bipu began his career with eventual Dhaka Third Division Football League champions Dilkusha SC in 2011.

Although Bipu spent much of his early career with Mohammedan SC, he had to move to Feni Soccer Club in 2014 in order to gain game time. In 2016, he established himself as Feni's first choice goalkeeper. The following year, after the club was relegated from the top tier, Bipu moved to Muktijoddha Sangsad KC.

On 2 January 2021, Bipu displayed a man of the match performance for Mohammedan SC against Saif SC in the quarterfinals of the 2020–21 Federation Cup. After saving two penalty shots in the tiebreaker, he was compared to former Black and White legend Sayeed Hassan Kanan.

== Personal life ==
In October 2018, Bipu underwent surgery for his broken hand, which kept him out of the game for almost five months. However, while still injured a rumour had spread throughout local media about his apparent death. Bipu later gave an interview with Prothom Alo clearing the false news.

== Honours ==
Dilkusha SC

- Dhaka Third Division League: 2011

Mohammedan SC

- Super Cup: 2013
- Independence Cup: 2014
- Federation Cup: 2022–23
