= Monjurur Rahman Manik =

Bangladeshi association footballer

Monjurur Manik
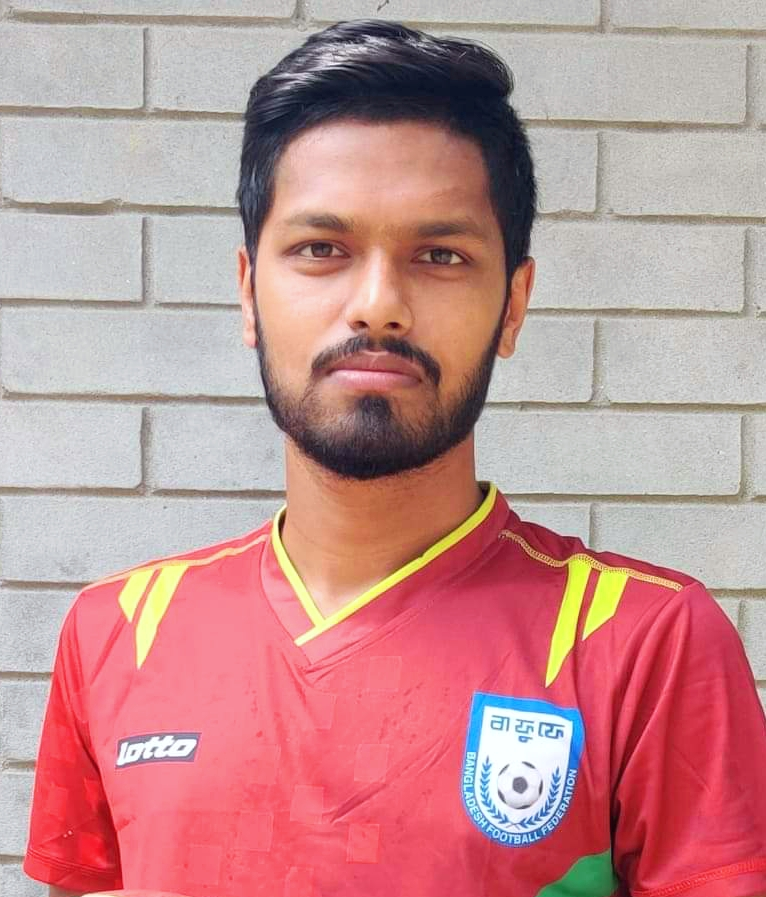
- Manik in 2020

Personal information
- Full name: Monjurur Rahman Manik
- Date of birth: 5 September 1996 (age 30)
- Place of birth: Tangail, Bangladesh
- Height: 1.80 m (5 ft 11 in)
- Position: Centre-back

Team information
- Current team: Fortis
- Number: 5

Youth career
- 2007–2012: BKSP

Senior career*
Years	Team	Apps	(Gls)
2013–2015	Feni		(0)
2016–2017	Muktijoddha		(1)
2017–2018	Mohammedan	19	(0)
2018–2019	Sheikh Jamal	20	(0)
2019–2021	Chittagong Abahani	19	(0)
2021–2022	Saif	3	(0)
2022–2023	Bangladesh Police	5	(0)
2023–2024	Sheikh Jamal	10	(0)
2024–	Fortis	25	(1)

International career^{‡}
	Bangladesh U16		(0)
2013	Bangladesh U19		(0)
2018–2026	Bangladesh U23	4 (Note: Appearances as an overage player (One appearance in 2026 Diamond Jubilee International Football Tournament))	(0)
2018–	Bangladesh	1	(0)
- * Club domestic league appearances and goals as of 1 June 2026 ‡ National team caps and goals as of 28 February 2020

Monjurur Rahman Manik (Bengali: মনজুরুর রহমান মানিক; born 5 September 1996) is a Bangladeshi professional footballer who plays as a center-back for Bangladesh Football League club Fortis.

== International career ==
On 29 August 2018, Manik made his senior career debut against Sri Lanka during an international friendly.

== Honours ==
Feni Soccer Club

- Independence Cup runner-up: 2013
