= Javokhir Sokhibov =

Uzbekistani footballer

Personal information
- Date of birth: 1 March 1995 (age 31)
- Place of birth: Uzbekistan
- Height: 1.78 m (5 ft 10 in)
- Position: Midfielder

Team information
- Current team: Uzgen

Senior career*
Years	Team	Apps	(Gls)
2013–2018	Pakhtakor	51	(5)
2018	→ Metallurg Bekabad (loan)	4	(0)
2018	→ Sogdiana Jizzakh (loan)	6	(0)
2019	Sogdiana Jizzakh	4	(0)
2019	Lokomotiv Tashkent	0	(0)
2020–2021	Turon	8	(1)
2021–2023	FC Surkhon	33	(0)
2023–2024	FC Alay	28	(1)
2024	Bangladesh Police	8	(0)
2025–	Uzgen	0	(0)

International career^{‡}
2014	Uzbekistan U-19	3	(0)
2015	Uzbekistan U-20	6	(1)
2016	Uzbekistan U-23	3	(1)
2015–2018	Uzbekistan	14	(0)
- * Club domestic league appearances and goals as of 2 March 2025 ‡ National team caps and goals as of 19 May 2018 (UTC)

Javokhir Sokhibov (Uzbek: Javohir Sohibov, Uzbek Cyrillic: Жавоҳир Соҳибов; born 1 March 1995) is an Uzbek professional footballer who plays as a defensive midfielder for Uzgen in the Kyrgyz Premier League.

== Club career ==
Sokhibov started playing in Pakhtakor since 2013. In 2013, he played only in 2 matches for Pakhtakor in League matches. He made his debut in the League on 30 June 2013 in the Tashkent derby match against Bunyodkor, coming on in the 81st minute. He played in 5 matches of the 2015 AFC Champions League for Pakhtakor. In the 2015 season he completed 14 matches in League (as of 25 August 2015).

== International career ==
He was one of the leading players of Uzbekistan U-19 in the 2014 AFC U-19 Championship. In 2015, he captained Uzbekistan U-20 in the 2015 FIFA U-20 World Cup where Uzbekistan U-20 reached the quarter-finals of the tournament. Sokhibov completed all 5 matches of the national team in the U-20 World Cup.

On 3 September 2015 Uzbekistan's main national team coach Samvel Babayan called up Sokhibov to play in the 2018 World Cup qualifying match against Yemen. Sokhibov made his debut in a match against Yemen, playing in the starting eleven and was replaced after first half.

== Career statistics ==
=== Club ===
As of 25 August 2015

Club	Season	League		Cup		AFC		Total	
Club	Season	Apps	Goals	Apps	Goals	Apps	Goals	Apps	Goals
Pakhtakor	2013	2	0	2	0	-		4	0
Pakhtakor	2014	0	0	1	0	-		1	0
Pakhtakor	2015	14	1	3	0	5	0	22	1
Pakhtakor	Total	16	1	6	0	5	0	27	1
Career total		16	1	6	0	5	0	27	1

== Honours ==
Pakhtakor

- Uzbek League: 2014
- Uzbekistan Super Cup runners-up: 2015
