= 2021–22 Chittagong Abahani season =

Chittagong Abahani 2021–22 football season

Chittagong Abahani
2021–22 season
- President: M. Abdul Latif
- Head coach: Maruful Haque
- Stadium: Shaheed Dhirendranath Datta Stadium
- Bangladesh Premier League: 7th
- Federation Cup: Quarter-final
- Independence Cup: Group stage
- Top goalscorer: League: Peter Ebimobowei (20); All: Peter Ebimobowei (22)
- Biggest win: Bangladesh Police FC 0–2 Chittagong Abahani; Chittagong Abahani 4–2 Uttar Baridhara Club
- Biggest defeat: Bashundhara Kings 5–0 Chittagong Abahani
- All statistics correct as of 20 July 2022.

The 2021–22 season was the Chittagong Abahani's 42nd season since its establishment in 1980 and their 12th season in the Bangladesh Premier League. This also remarked their 8th consecutive season in the top flight after getting promoted in 2014. In addition to domestic league, Ctg Abahani participated on this season's edition of Federation Cup and Independence Cup. The season covered the period from October 2021 to August 2022.

One of the club's new overseas signings, Nigerian striker Peter Ebimobowei scored 22 goals across all the competitions including 20 goals in 2021–22 BPL, making him the first player of the club to score 20 goals in a single Premier League season. Among the other overseas signings of this season, Omid Popalzay was the first Afghan and William Twala was the first South African to represent the club. This was the last season under head coach Maruful Haque.

== Players ==
As of 26 April 2022

No.	Player	Nat.	Position(s)	Date Of Birth	Year signed	Previous club
Goalkeepers
1	Azad Hossain	(Bangladesh)	GK	15 February 1999 (age 27)	2018	(Bangladesh) Muktijoddha Sangsad KC
22	Nayeem Mia	(Bangladesh)	GK	21 December 1998 (age 27)	2021	(Bangladesh) Abahani Ltd. Dhaka
25	SK Saiful Islam	(Bangladesh)	GK	3 March 1992 (age 34)	2021	(Bangladesh) Saif Sporting Club
30	Showkat Hossen Hasan	(Bangladesh)	GK	3 January 1999 (age 27)	2021	(Bangladesh) Fortis FC
31	Emon Hawladar	(Bangladesh)	GK	16 October 2002 (age 24)	2021	(Bangladesh) Saif Sporting Club
Defenders
2	Kamrul Islam	(Bangladesh)	LB/CB	25 December 1998 (age 27)	2021	(Bangladesh) Dhaka Mohammedan
3	Shawkat Russel	(Bangladesh)	CB	4 February 1991 (age 35)	2019	(Bangladesh) Sheikh Jamal DC
4	Soeb Mia	(Bangladesh)	RB/LB	3 January 1992 (age 34)	2021	(Bangladesh) Muktijoddha Sangsad KC
5	Jalal Mia	(Bangladesh)	CB	12 December 1994 (age 31)	2021	Bangladesh Police FC
13	Shakil Ahad Topu	(Bangladesh)	CB	6 April 2006 (age 20)	2022	BKSP Academy
15	Apu Ahamed	(Bangladesh)	CB/RB	30 April 1992 (age 34)	2019	(Bangladesh) Agrani Bank Ltd. SC
16	Sakib Sultan Rafu	(Bangladesh)	RB	2 December 1997 (age 28)	2021	(Bangladesh) NoFeL SC
23	Monir Alam	(Bangladesh)	LB/RB	24 March 2000 (age 26)	2018	(Bangladesh) Muktijoddha Sangsad KC
26	Yisa Anifowoshe	(Nigeria)	CB/DM	11 October 1992 (age 34)	2021	Bahrain SC
28	Amit Hasan	(Bangladesh)	LB/LW	22 December 2002 (age 23)	2021	(Bangladesh) Fortis FC
44	Habibur Rahman Nolok	(Bangladesh)	RB	4 August 1996 (age 30)	2022	(Bangladesh) Muktijoddha Sangsad KC
55	Nazim Uddin Mithu	(Bangladesh)	CB	2 December 1996 (age 29)	2021	(Bangladesh) NoFeL SC
Midfielders
6	Arafat Hossen	(Bangladesh)	DM	7 May 1995 (age 31)	2021	(Bangladesh) Rahmatganj MFS
8	Saker Ullah	(Bangladesh)	DM/CM	18 October 1995 (age 31)	2019	(Bangladesh) NoFeL SC
10	Shohel Rana	(Bangladesh)	DM/AM/LW	1 June 1996 (age 30)	2019	(Bangladesh) Rahmatganj MFS
12	Koushik Barua	(Bangladesh)	CM/AM	4 October 1995 (age 31)	2014	(Bangladesh) Agrani Bank Ltd. SC
14	Mohammad Munna	(Bangladesh)	DM	10 August 1998 (age 28)	2021	(Bangladesh) Fakirerpool YMC
18	Rabiul Hasan	(Bangladesh)	AM/LW	26 June 1999 (age 27)	2021	(Bangladesh) Dhaka Mohammedan
19	Omid Popalzay	(Afghanistan)	AM/LW	25 January 1996 (age 30)	2021	(Poland) Olimpia Grudziądz
21	Rasedul Islam	(Bangladesh)	AM/LW	4 November 2003 (age 23)	2021	(Bangladesh) Bashundhara Kings U18
Forwards
7	Mohamed Zahid Hossain	(Bangladesh)	RW	15 January 1988 (age 38)	2021	(Bangladesh) Sheikh Jamal DC
9	Shakawat Hossain Rony	(Bangladesh)	CF/SS/RW	8 October 1991 (age 35)	2019	(Bangladesh) Sheikh Jamal DC
11	Rubel Mia	(Bangladesh)	RW/CF	1 January 1995 (age 31)	2021	(Bangladesh) Abahani Ltd. Dhaka
17	Arifur Rahman	(Bangladesh)	LW	15 February 1999 (age 27)	2021	(Bangladesh) Saif Sporting Club
24	Toriqul Islam Julfikar	(Bangladesh)	CF	10 June 1997 (age 29)	2021	(Bangladesh) Sheikh Jamal DC
27	Peter Ebimobowei	(Nigeria)	CF/SS	11 November 1993 (age 32)	2021	(Oman) Al-Nahda Club
80	Candy Augustine	(Nigeria)	RW/LW	22 December 1996 (age 29)	2022	(Northern Cyprus) Mesarya SK
99	Masum Mia	(Bangladesh)	RW/LW	8 September 2002 (age 24)	2021	(Bangladesh) NoFeL SC

== Transfers ==
=== In ===
No.	Pos	Player	Previous club	Fee	Date	Source
2	DF	(Bangladesh) Kamrul Islam	(Bangladesh) Dhaka Mohammedan	Free transfer	November 2021	
4	DF	(Bangladesh) Soeb Mia	(Bangladesh) Muktijoddha Sangsad KC	Free transfer	September 2021	
5	DF	(Bangladesh) Jalal Mia	Bangladesh Police FC	Free transfer	November 2021	
6	MF	(Bangladesh) Arafat Hossen	(Bangladesh) Rahmatganj MFS	Free transfer	September 2021	
7	FW	(Bangladesh) Mohamed Zahid Hossain	(Bangladesh) Sheikh Jamal DC	Free transfer	November 2021	
11	FW	(Bangladesh) Rubel Miya	(Bangladesh) Abahani Ltd. Dhaka	Free transfer	November 2021	
14	MF	(Bangladesh) Mohammad Munna	(Bangladesh) Fakirerpool YMC	Free transfer	September 2021	
16	DF	(Bangladesh) Sakib Sultan Rafu	(Bangladesh) NoFeL SC	Free transfer	November 2021	
17	FW	(Bangladesh) Arifur Rahman	(Bangladesh) Saif Sporting Club	Free transfer	September 2021	
18	MF	(Bangladesh) Rabiul Hasan	(Bangladesh) Dhaka Mohammedan	Free transfer	September 2021	
19	MF	(Afghanistan) Omid Popalzay	(Poland) Olimpia Grudziądz	Free transfer	November 2021	
20	FW	(South Africa) William Twala	(India) Madan Maharaj FC	Free transfer	November 2021	
21	MF	(Bangladesh) Rasedul Islam	(Bangladesh) Bashundhara Kings U18	Free transfer	November 2021	
22	GK	(Bangladesh) Nayeem Mia	(Bangladesh) Abahani Ltd. Dhaka	Free transfer	November 2021	
24	FW	(Bangladesh) Toriqul Islam Julfikar	(Bangladesh) Sheikh Jamal DC	Free transfer	November 2021	
25	GK	(Bangladesh) SK Saiful Islam	(Bangladesh) Saif Sporting Club	Free transfer	October 2021	
26	DF	(Nigeria) Kehinde Yisa Anifowoshe	Bahrain SC	Free transfer	November 2021	
27	FW	(Nigeria) Peter Ebimobowei	(Oman) Al-Nahda Club	Free transfer	November 2021	
28	DF	(Bangladesh) Amit Hasan	(Bangladesh) Fortis FC	Free transfer	November 2021	
30	GK	(Bangladesh) Showkat Hossen Hasan	(Bangladesh) Fortis FC	Free transfer	November 2021	
31	GK	(Bangladesh) Emon Hawladar	(Bangladesh) Saif Sporting Club	Free transfer	November 2021	
55	DF	(Bangladesh) Nazim Uddin Mithu	(Bangladesh) NoFeL SC	Free transfer	September 2021	
99	DF	(Bangladesh) Masum Mia	(Bangladesh) NoFeL SC	Free transfer	November 2021	
13	DF	(Bangladesh) Shakil Ahad Topu	BKSP Academy	Free transfer	April 2022	
44	DF	(Bangladesh) Habibur Rahman Nolok	(Bangladesh) Muktijoddha SKC	Free transfer	April 2022	
80	FW	(Nigeria) Candy Augustine	(Northern Cyprus) Mesarya SK	Free transfer	April 2022	

=== Out ===
No.	Pos	Player	Moved to	Fee	Date	Source
25	DF	(Uzbekistan) Shukurali Pulatov	Without club	Free transfer	August 2021	
2	DF	(Bangladesh) Mohammad Rockey	Bangladesh Police FC	Free transfer	September 2021	
4	MF	(Bangladesh) Manik Hossain Molla	(Bangladesh) Sheikh Russel KC	Free transfer	September 2021	
5	DF	(Bangladesh) Monjurur Rahman Manik	(Bangladesh) Saif SC	Free transfer	September 2021	
6	DF	(Bangladesh) Nasirul Islam Nasir	(Bangladesh) Saif SC	Free transfer	September 2021	
7	FW	(Bangladesh) Rakib Hossain	(Bangladesh) Abahani Limited Dhaka	Free transfer	September 2021	
8	MF	(Ivory Coast) Didier Brossou	Without club	Free transfer	September 2021	
9	FW	(Brazil) Nixon Guylherme	(Malaysia) Kelantan F.C.	Free transfer	September 2021	
10	FW	(Nigeria) Matthew Chinedu	(Bangladesh) Sheikh Jamal DC	Free transfer	September 2021	
14	MF	(Bangladesh) Monaem Khan Raju	Bangladesh Police FC	Free transfer	November 2021	
15	MF	(Bangladesh) Shafiqul Islam Bipul	(Bangladesh) Sheikh Jamal DC	Free transfer	September 2021	
17	MF	(Bangladesh) Mannaf Rabby	(Bangladesh) Sheikh Russel KC	Free transfer	September 2021	
18	MF	(Bangladesh) Zahid Parvez Chowdhury	Without club	Free transfer	September 2021	
19	MF	(Bangladesh) Kawsar Ali Rabbi	(Bangladesh) Saif Sporting Club	Free transfer	September 2021	
21	DF	(Bangladesh) Ashik Ahammed	(Bangladesh) Swadhinata KS	Free transfer	September 2021	
26	DF	(Bangladesh) Saddam Hossain Anny	(Bangladesh) Saif Sporting Club	Free transfer	October 2021	
28	MF	(Bangladesh) Mynul Islam	Without club	Free transfer	September 2021	
32	DF	(Bangladesh) Rashed Hossain	(Bangladesh) Uttar Baridhara Club	Free transfer	September 2021	
33	GK	(Bangladesh) Mohammad Nayem	(Bangladesh) Sheikh Jamal DC	Free transfer	September 2021	
40	GK	(Bangladesh) Nasarul Islam Hero	(Bangladesh) Swadhinata KS	Free transfer	September 2021	
44	GK	(Bangladesh) Minhaz Uddin Chaudhury	Without club	Free transfer	September 2021	
20	FW	(South Africa) William Twala	Without club	Free transfer	April 2022	

== Pre-season and friendlies ==
Win Draw Loss Fixtures

22 November 2021 Friendly	Sheikh Jamal DC	2–1	Chittagong Abahani	Dhaka
8:30 BST (UTC+6)	Jose Hernandez; Otabek		Peter	Stadium: Sheikh Jamal DC Football Ground

19 January 2022 Friendly	Police FC	2–1	Chittagong Abahani	Dhaka
			Shohel Rana	Stadium: BUET Ground

== Competitions ==
=== Overview ===
Competition	First match	Last match	Starting round	Final position	Record							
Competition	First match	Last match	Starting round	Final position	Pld	W	D	L	GF	GA	GD	Win %
BPL	5 February 2022	1 August 2022	Matchday 1	7th	22	8	7	7	39	42	−3	36.36
Federation Cup	28 December 2021	2 January 2022	Group Stage	Quarter-final	3	1	0	2	4	4	+0	33.33
Independence Cup	30 November 2021	8 December 2021	Group Stage	Group stage	3	0	2	1	2	5	−3	0.00
Total					28	9	9	10	45	51	−6	32.14

Source: Soccerway

=== Independence Cup ===
==== Group stage ====
The draw for the group stage was held on 23 November 2021.

Pos	Team	Pld	W	D	L	GF	GA	GD	Pts	Status
1	Bashundhara Kings	3	3	0	0	10	0	+10	9	Qualified for Knockout stage
2	Bangladesh Police FC	3	0	2	1	2	3	−1	2	Qualified for Knockout stage
3	Chittagong Abahani	3	0	2	1	2	5	−3	2	
4	Bangladesh Navy	3	0	2	1	2	8	−6	2	

Source: Global Sports Archive
Rules for classification: Group stage tiebreakers

30 November 2021 1	Chittagong Abahani	1-1	Bangladesh Police FC	Dhaka
16:00 BST (UTC+6)	Peter 58' (pen.); Rubel (yellow card) 67'	Report	Raju (yellow card) 21'; Denilson 48'; Rokey (yellow card) 73'	Stadium: BSSS Mostafa Kamal Stadium; Referee: Md Mizanur Rahman

4 December 2021 2	Bangladesh Navy	1-1	Chittagong Abahani	Dhaka
18:00 BST (UTC+6)	Jewel 14', (yellow card) 71'; Sohel (yellow card) 46'; Shakil (yellow card) 89'	Report	Shohel (yellow card) 38' (yellow-red card) 85'; Kamrul (yellow card) 45'; Yisa (yellow card) 45+3', (goal) 89'	Stadium: BSSS Mostafa Kamal Stadium; Referee: Saymoon Sany

8 December 2021 3	Bashundhara Kings	3-0	Chittagong Abahani	Dhaka
18:00 BST (UTC+6)	Rimon Hossain (yellow card) 1'; Robinho 22'; Ibrahim 83'; Motin 88'	Report	Yisa (yellow card) 36'; Azad (red card) 81'	Stadium: BSSS Mostafa Kamal Stadium; Referee: Md Alamgir Sarkar

=== Federation Cup ===
==== Group stage ====
The draw for the group stage was held on 23 December 2021.

Pos	Team	Pld	W	D	L	GF	GA	GD	Pts	Status
1	Saif Sporting Club	2	1	1	0	3	2	+1	4	Advance to Knockout stage
2	Chittagong Abahani	2	1	0	1	3	2	+1	3	Advance to Knockout stage
3	Bangladesh Police FC	2	0	1	1	1	3	−2	1	

Source: Soccerway
Rules for classification: Group stage tiebreakers

28 December 2022	Bangladesh Police FC	0–2	Chittagong Abahani	Dhaka
16:00 BST (UTC+6)	Isa (yellow card) 21'	Report	Arifur 24'; William 60'	Stadium: BSSS Mostafa Kamal Stadium; Referee: Md Alamgir Sarker

30 December 2022	Chittagong Abahani	1–2	Saif Sporting Club	Dhaka
18:45 BST (UTC+6)	Rasedul (yellow card) 2'; Arifur (yellow card) 64', (goal) 84'	Report	Maraz 35'; Gafurov 39'; Riyadul (red card) 78'	Stadium: BSSS Mostafa Kamal Stadium; Referee: Saymoon Sany

==== Knockout phase ====
2 January 2022 Quarter-finals	Mohammedan SC	2–1	Chittagong Abahani	Dhaka
16:30 BST (UTC+6)	Sujon (yellow card) 35'; Arafat 65' (o.g.); Emon 74'; Anik (yellow card) 71'; Obi Moneke (yellow card) 89'	Report	Shohel (yellow card) 28'; Kamrul (yellow card) 45+2'; Peter 90'; Koushik (yellow card) 90+1'	Stadium: BSSS Mostafa Kamal Stadium; Referee: Anisur Rahman

=== Bangladesh Premier League ===
==== League table ====
Pos	Team	Pld	W	D	L	GF	GA	GD	Pts
5	Dhaka Mohammedan	22	8	9	5	39	26	+13	33
6	Sheikh Russel KC	22	8	7	7	35	31	+4	31
7	Chittagong Abahani	22	8	7	7	39	42	−3	31
8	Bangladesh Police FC	22	8	6	8	28	32	−4	30
9	Muktijoddha Sangsad KC	22	5	4	13	27	42	−15	19

Source: Soccerway
Rules for classification: 1) Points; 2) Goal difference; 3) Goals scored.

==== Results summary ====
Overall								Home						Away					
Pld	W	D	L	GF	GA	GD	Pts	W	D	L	GF	GA	GD	W	D	L	GF	GA	GD
22	8	7	7	39	42	−3	31	5	2	5	24	24	0	3	5	2	15	18	−3

Source: Soccerway

==== Results by round ====
Round	1	2	3	4	5	6	7	8	9	10	11	12	13	14	15	16	17	18	19	20	21	22
Ground	H	A	H	A	A	A	A	A	H	H	A	A	H	A	H	H	H	H	H	A	A	H
Result	W	D	D	W	D	W	L	L	W	W	W	D	L	D	W	L	L	L	L	D	D	W
Position	1	3	5	5	4	4	4	5	5	4	4	4	4	5	5	5	5	7	7	7	8	7

Source: Matches
A = Away; H = Home; W = Win; D = Draw; L = Loss; P = Postponed

==== Matches ====
5 February 2022 1	Chittagong Abahani	2-1	Rahmatganj MFS	Munshiganj
15:00 BST (UTC+6)	Peter 53'; Rubel 72'; Shohel (yellow card) 84'	Report	M. Kiron (yellow card) 1'; Adjah 4'	Stadium: SBS Flight Lt. Matiur Rahman Stadium; Referee: Bhubon Torofder

9 February 2022 2	Sheikh Russel KC	1–1	Chittagong Abahani	Tongi
15:00 BST (UTC+6)	Akmatov (yellow card) 16'; Jewel 20'	Report	Zahid (yellow card) 9'; Peter 33'; Kamrul (yellow card) 60'	Stadium: Shaheed Ahsan Ullah Master Stadium; Referee: Bhubon Torofder

14 February 2022 3	Chittagong Abahani	1-1	Mohammedan SC	Tongi
15:00 BST (UTC+6)	Kamrul 47'; Zahid (yellow card) 56'; Koushik (yellow card) 59'	Report	Diabate 28'; Masud Rana (yellow card) 59' (yellow-red card) 90+1'	Stadium: Shaheed Ahsan Ullah Master Stadium; Referee: Symoon Hasan Sany

19 February 2022 4	Swadhinata KS	1–2	Chittagong Abahani	Rajshahi
15:00 BST (UTC+6)	Jahedul 79'	Report	Peter 24' (pen.); Shawkat (yellow card) 53'; William (yellow card) 58' (yellow-red card) 85'; O. Popalzay 71'; Saiful (yellow card) 90+4'	Stadium: Muktijuddho Sriti Stadium; Referee: Mizanur Rahman

24 February 2022 5	Saif SC	3–3	Chittagong Abahani	Munshiganj
15:00 BST (UTC+6)	Sazzad 5'; Emeka 58' (pen.), 80' (pen.)	Report	Peter Ebi 45+2' (pen.), 67', 90+3', (yellow card) 90+4'	Stadium: SBS Flight Lt. Matiur Rahman Stadium; Referee: Mizanur Rahman

1 March 2022 6	Abahani Ltd. Dhaka	2–3	Chittagong Abahani	Sylhet
17:30 BST (UTC+6)	Colindres 16', (yellow card) 45+2'; Milad Sheykh (yellow card) 71'; Augusto 89'	Report	Peter Ebi 20'; W. Twala 37'; O. Popalzay 64'	Stadium: Sylhet District Stadium; Referee: Symoon Sany

6 March 2022 7	Sheikh Jamal DC	2-1	Chittagong Abahani	Munshiganj
15:30 BST (UTC+6)	Kanform 29', 68'; Nayem (yellow card) 90+1'	Report	O. Popalzay (penalty missed) 76'; Peter Ebi 83', (yellow card) 90+2'	Stadium: SBS Flight Lt. Matiur Rahman Stadium; Referee: Mizanur Rahman

11 March 2022 8	Bashundhara Kings	5-0	Chittagong Abahani	Dhaka
15:30 BST (UTC+6)	Sumon 17'; Robinho 28', 43'; Ibrahim 32'; Kingsley 67'	Report	Yisa (yellow card) 61'	Stadium: Bashundhara Sports Complex; Referee: Bhubon Tarafder

17 March 2022 9	Chittagong Abahani	4-2	Uttar Baridhara	Cumilla
15:30 BST (UTC+6)	Peter Ebi 12' (pen.), 38', 41'; Shohel (yellow card) 32'; O. Popalzay 61'	Report	Arif Hossain (yellow card) 29'; Mahmoud Sayed (yellow card) 50'; Kahraba (yellow card) 65'; Fozilov 68'; Kochnev 90+3'	Stadium: Shaheed Dhirendranath Datta Stadium; Referee: Mahmud Zamal Farouqee Nahid

3 April 2022 10	Chittagong Abahani	2-1	Muktijoddha Sangsad KC	Cumilla
15:30 BST (UTC+6)	Peter Ebi 27'; Sohel Rana (yellow card) 56', (goal) 66'	Report	Otani 45'; Sajon (yellow card) 52'; Sajib (yellow card) 79'; Tareq (yellow card) 90+3'	Stadium: Shaheed Dhirendranath Datta Stadium; Referee: G. Chawdhury Nayan

8 April 2022 11	Bangladesh Police FC	1-2	Chittagong Abahani	Rajshahi
15:30 BST (UTC+6)	Al Amin 2', (yellow card) 45+3'; J. Roy (yellow card) 5'; Danilo (yellow card) 21'; M. Khan (yellow card) 47'; Shamim (yellow card) 90'	Report	O. Popalzay (yellow card) 59'; Peter Ebi 84' (pen.); Yisa 86'; Koushik (yellow card) 88'	Stadium: Muktijuddho Sriti Stadium; Referee: B. Tarafder

25 April 2022 12	Rahmatganj MFS	0-0	Chittagong Abahani	Sylhet
15:45 BST (UTC+6)	M. Kiron (yellow card) 66'	Report	Shakawat Rony (yellow card) 50'	Stadium: Sylhet District Stadium; Referee: Alomgir Sarker

30 April 2022 13	Chittagong Abahani	1–2	Sheikh Russel KC	Cumilla
15:30 BST (UTC+6)	Zahid (yellow card) 62'; Shohel Rana (yellow card) 71'; Yisa (yellow card) 86'; Shakawat Rony 90+6'	Report	Akinade 32'; A. Akmatov 51' (pen.)	Stadium: Shaheed Dhirendranath Datta Stadium; Referee: Anisur Rahman

8 May 2022 14	Mohammedan SC	3–3	Chittagong Abahani	Cumilla
15:45 BST (UTC+6)	S. Diabate 2', 68', 90+5', (penalty missed) 63'; A. Reardon (yellow card) 90+8'	Report	S. Rony 13', 26', (yellow card) 81'; Peter 59' (pen.)	Stadium: Shaheed Dhirendranath Datta Stadium; Referee: G. Chowdry

13 May 2022 15	Chittagong Abahani	3–2	Swadhinata KS	Cumilla
16:15 BST (UTC+6)	Soeb Mia (yellow card) 70'; Candy 74'; Peter 85', 88'	Report	Rasel (yellow card) 45'; Y. Suzuki (yellow card) 73'; Sabbir 76'; Bishal 90'	Stadium: Shaheed Dhirendranath Datta Stadium; Referee: Jalal Uddin

23 June 2022 16	Chittagong Abahani	3–4	Saif SC	Cumilla
16:00 BST (UTC+6)	Apu (yellow card) 50'; O. Popalzay 57'; Candy 65'; Peter 86' (pen.)	Report	Emeka 43', (penalty missed) 51'; Anny (yellow card) 56'; Fahim 72', 74'; Mitul (yellow card) 85'; Bayisenge 90+1' (pen.)	Stadium: Shaheed Dhirendranath Datta Stadium; Referee: GM Nayan

28 June 2022 17	Chittagong Abahani	2–3	Abahani Ltd. Dhaka	Cumilla
16:00 BST (UTC+6)	O. Popalzay 32'; Peter Ebi 40' (pen.); Candy (yellow card) 45+5' (yellow-red card) 57'; Yisa (yellow card) 55'	Report	Monir Hossain (yellow card) 31'; Dorielton 34', 71'; Royal (yellow card) 45+5'; Nurul Naium 78'	Stadium: Shaheed Dhirendranath Datta Stadium; Referee: Jalal Uddin

3 July 2022 18	Chittagong Abahani	0–2	Sheikh Jamal DC	Cumilla
15:30 BST (UTC+6)	Soeb (yellow card) 45+5'; Peter Ebi (penalty missed) 90+1'	Report	Otabek 28', 78'; Ariful (yellow card) 81'	Stadium: Shaheed Dhirendranath Datta Stadium; Referee: B. Barua

7 July 2022 19	Chittagong Abahani	0–1	Bashundhara Kings	Cumilla
16:00 BST (UTC+6)	Candy (yellow card) 14'; Arafat (yellow card) 90+4'	Report	Shafiei (yellow card) 42'; H. Remon (yellow card) 45+7'; Nuha 52'; Yeasin (yellow card) 57'; Miguel (yellow card) 85'; Mahdi (yellow card) 90+5'	Stadium: Shaheed Dhirendranath Datta Stadium; Referee: S. Sany

20 July 2022 20	Uttar Baridhara Club	2–2	Chittagong Abahani	Gopalganj
16:00 BST (UTC+6)	S. Fozilov 50'; Arif Hossain 78'	Report	S. Rony 10'; Arifur 37'	Stadium: Sheikh Fazlul Haque Mani Stadium; Referee: Sabuj Das

27 July 2022 21	Muktijoddha Sangsad KC	1–1	Chittagong Abahani	Gopalganj
16:00 BST (UTC+6)	Tariqul 2'; A. Camara (yellow card) 44'; Tareq (yellow card) 90+2'	Report	Candy 39'; Koushik (yellow card) 85'	Stadium: Sheikh Fazlul Haque Mani Stadium; Referee: S. Hossain

1 August 2022 22	Chittagong Abahani	v	Bangladesh Police FC	Cumilla
16:00 BST (UTC+6)	Peter Ebi 29', 61'; Shohel (yellow card) 39', (red card) 77'; Candy 49', (yellow card) 87'	Report	Kouakou 10', (yellow card) 26', (red card) 77'; D. Djawa (yellow card) 18'; R. Moni (yellow card) 32'; Sharifi 78' (pen.)	Stadium: Shaheed Dhirendranath Datta Stadium; Referee: Bituraj Barua

== Statistics ==
=== Squad statistics ===
No.	Pos	Nat	Player	Total		BPL		Federation Cup		Independence Cup	
No.	Pos	Nat	Player	Apps	Goals	Apps	Goals	Apps	Goals	Apps	Goals
1	GK	(Bangladesh)	Azad Hossain	7	0	4	0	0	0	3	0
2	DF	(Bangladesh)	Kamrul Islam	16	1	9+2	1	2	0	3	0
3	DF	(Bangladesh)	Shawkat Russel	14	0	12+1	0	0	0	1	0
4	MF	(Bangladesh)	Soeb Mia	15	0	9+4	0	1	0	1	0
5	DF	(Bangladesh)	Jalal Mia	11	0	3+3	0	3	0	2	0
6	MF	(Bangladesh)	Arafat Hossen	20	0	5+9	0	3	0	2+1	0
7	FW	(Bangladesh)	Mohamed Zahid Hossain	14	0	9+5	0	0	0	-	-
8	MF	(Bangladesh)	Saker Ullah	11	0	0+6	0	1+1	0	2+1	0
9	FW	(Bangladesh)	Shakawat Hossain Rony	17	4	9+5	4	3	0	-	-
10	MF	(Bangladesh)	Shohel Rana	26	1	21	1	2+1	0	2	0
11	FW	(Bangladesh)	Rubel Miya	22	1	1+15	1	2+1	0	3	0
12	MF	(Bangladesh)	Koushik Barua	27	0	16+5	0	2+1	0	3	0
13	DF	(Bangladesh)	Shakil Ahad Topu	1	0	0+1	0	0	0	0	0
14	MF	(Bangladesh)	Mohammad Munna	1	0	0	0	0	0	0+1	0
15	DF	(Bangladesh)	Apu Ahamed	12	0	11+1	0	0	0	0	0
16	DF	(Bangladesh)	Sakib Sultan Rafu	1	0	0	0	1	0	0	0
17	FW	(Bangladesh)	Arifur Rahman	19	3	10+3	1	1+2	2	1+2	0
18	MF	(Bangladesh)	Rabiul Hasan	8	0	4+4	0	0	0	0	0
19	MF	(Afghanistan)	Omid Popalzay	20	5	20	5	0	0	0	0
20	FW	(South Africa)	William Twala†	15	2	6+3	1	2+1	1	1+2	0
21	MF	(Bangladesh)	Rasedul Islam	2	0	0	0	1+1	0	0	0
22	GK	(Bangladesh)	Nayeem Mia	9	0	8+1	0	0	0	0	0
23	DF	(Bangladesh)	Monir Alam	28	0	22	0	2+1	0	3	0
24	FW	(Bangladesh)	Toriqul Islam Julfikar	9	0	0+6	0	1+1	0	0+1	0
25	GK	(Bangladesh)	SK Saiful Islam	14	0	10	0	3	0	0+1	0
26	DF	(Nigeria)	Kehinde Yisa Anifowoshe	27	2	21	1	3	0	3	1
27	FW	(Nigeria)	Peter Ebimobowei	25	22	21	20	0+1	1	3	1
28	DF	(Bangladesh)	Amit Hasan	0	0	0	0	0	0	0	0
30	GK	(Bangladesh)	Showkat Hossen Hasan	0	0	0	0	0	0	0	0
31	GK	(Bangladesh)	Emon Hawladar	0	0	0	0	0	0	0	0
44	DF	(Bangladesh)	Habibur Rahman Nolok	2	0	1+1	0	0	0	0	0
55	DF	(Bangladesh)	Nazim Uddin Mithu	0	0	0	0	0	0	0	0
80	DF	(Nigeria)	Candy Augustine	10	4	10	4	0	0	0	0
99	FW	(Bangladesh)	Masum Mia	0	0	0	0	0	0	0	0

Last updated: 1 August 2022
Source: Soccerway

^{†} Player left Ctg Abahani during the season.

Independence Cup: Mohamed Zahid Hossain and Shakawat Hossain Rony played for their own services team Bangladesh Navy football team in Independence Cup.

=== Goalscorers ===
As of matches played till 1 August 2022

Rank	Nat	Player	Position	Total	BPL	Federation Cup	Independence Cup
1	(Nigeria)	Peter Ebimobowei	FW	22	20	1	1
2	(Afghanistan)	Omid Popalzay	MF	5	5	0	0
3	(Bangladesh)	Shakawat Rony	FW	4	4	0	0
3	(Nigeria)	Candy Augustine	FW	4	4	0	0
4	(Bangladesh)	Arifur Rahman	FW	3	1	2	0
5	(South Africa)	William Twala	FW	2	1	1	0
5	(Nigeria)	Kehinde Yisa Anifowoshe	DF	2	1	0	1
8	(Bangladesh)	Rubel Miya	FW	1	1	0	0
8	(Bangladesh)	Shohel Rana	MF	1	1	0	0
8	(Bangladesh)	Kamrul Islam	DF	1	1	0	0
Own goals				0	0	0	0
Total				42	36	4	2

=== Assists ===
As of matches played till 1 August 2022

Rank	Nat.	Player	Position	Total	BPL	Federation Cup	Independence Cup
1	(Afghanistan)	Omid Popalzay	MF	6	6	0	0
2	(Bangladesh)	Shohel Rana	MF	5	4	1	0
3	(Nigeria)	Peter Ebimobowei	FW	4	4	0	0
3	(Nigeria)	Candy Augustine	FW	3	3		
5	(Bangladesh)	Kamrul Islam	DF	3	1	1	1
5	(Nigeria)	Kehinde Yisa Anifowoshe	DF	3	3	0	0
7	(Bangladesh)	Soeb Mia	DF	2	1	1	0
7	(Bangladesh)	Koushik Barua	MF	2	2	0	0
9	(Bangladesh)	Rubel Mia	FW	1	1		
9	(Bangladesh)	Zahid Hossain	FW	1	1	0	0,
9	(Bangladesh)	Rabiul Hasan	MF	1	1	0	0
