= 2021–22 Bangladesh Police FC season =

Bangladesh Police FC
2021–22 season
- President: Abdullah Al-Mamun
- Head coach: Aristică Cioabă
- Stadium: Rajshahi District Stadium
- Bangladesh Premier League: 8th
- Federation Cup: Group stages
- Independence Cup: Semi-finals
- Top goalscorer: League: Amredin Sharifi (9 goals); All: Amredin Sharifi (11 goals)
- Biggest win: 4–2 Vs Swadhinata KS (7 March 2022)
- Biggest defeat: 1–6 Vs Saif Sporting Club (25 April 2022)
Home colours	Away colours

The 2021–22 season was Bangladesh Police Football Club's 3rd season in the top flight, Bangladesh Premier League. In addition to domestic league, Bangladesh Police FC will participate on this season's edition of Federation Cup and Independence Cup. This season cover period was 1 October 2021 to 1 August 2022.

== Season preview ==
=== October ===
On 17 October 2021 Police FC has appointed Romanian Aristică Cioabă as a head coach for next domestic football season.

On 31 August 2021 forward Jamir Uddin left the club to Saif Sporting Club on free transfer contract.

On 22 October 2021 midfielder Nazmul Islam Rasel ended his contract and he has signed with Saif Sporting Club for upcoming football season.

=== November ===
On 30 November Bangladesh Police FC have meet first match of the season and they have finished the match with 1–1 goals drew against Chittagong Abahani. In the second half Portuguese midfielder Denílson goal lead them but Chittagong Abahani Peter Ebimobowei equalized the score.

=== December ===
On 4 December Bangladesh Police FC lost by 0–1 goal to Bashundhara Kings. Winning penalty goal on 16 minutes by Robinho secured the club victory.

On 8 December Bangladesh Police FC draw 1–1 goals with Bangladesh Navy. In the 6 minutes of second half M S Bablu gave them lead but 72 minutes Police FC Afghan forward Amredin Sharifi own goal level the scored and match ended with 1–1 goals.

On 12 December Bangladesh Police FC defeated 1–0 goal Sheikh Russel KC. Winning goal by Amredin Sharifi on 4 minutes and ensured their victory. As a result of this match they have qualified to Semi-finals.

On 14 December Bangladesh Police FC lost by 1–2 goals versus Bashundhara Kings. On 8 minutes Danilo Quipapá goal took lead Police FC. In the 30 minutes Kings Mohammed Ibrahim equalized 1–1 and finished half time. In the second half both team played goalless end of second half extended 30 minutes Yeasin Arafat goal on 119 minutes ensured Kings victory.

On 26 December Bangladesh Police FC 1–1 draw versus Saif Sporting Club. On 55 minutes Saif defender Emery Bayisenge penalty goal took lead Saif SC but in the additional time 90+2 minutes goals by Amredin Sharefi draw the match and both teams share point.

On 28 December Bangladesh Police FC lost 0–2 goals against Chittagong Abahani. In the first half 24 minutes scored by Arifur Rahman Chittagong Abahai hold lead and end first half. In the second half 60 minutes William Twala goal Chittagong Abahani made 2–0 and they ensure 3 points.

=== February ===
On 4 February Bangladesh Police FC had their season's first away match against Saif Sporting Club and lost by 0–1 goal. Both team in the first half has played goalless. In the second half regulations times ended 0–0 but in the additional time on 90+2 minutes Saif SC Rwandian defender Emery Bayisenge goal gave them 3 points and left the field with victory. Bangladesh Police FC started Premier League journey will lost match.

On 8 February Bangladesh Police FC drawn 1–1 goals home match against Dhaka Abahani. In the first half time both teams played excellent and competitive football and until half time score 0–0 goal. In the second half on 76 minutes a goal by Danilo Quipapá Bangladesh Police FC got lead 1–0 until addition time scored by Dhaka Abahani on (90+3) minutes Dorielton match finished with a 1–1 goals drawn.

On 12 February Bangladesh Police FC met Sheikh Jamal DC in the away match and finished it goalless 0–0. In the first half both team play excellent and ended it goalless. In the second half both teams started playing attacking football to take lead but they won't found any goals. On 81 minutes Uzbekistan Otabek Valizhazov showed red card due to bad fouls. Last 19 minutes Sheikh Jamal DC played with 10 men's squad but Police FC couldn't able to score any goal.

On 17 February Bangladesh Police FC lost 0–3 goals against Bashundhara Kings in the away game. In the first halftime both teams played excellent football but no teams has score any goals. In the second half on 66 minutes a goal by Robinho Bashudhara Kings took lead. On 77 minutes penalty goal by Robinho lead the score 2–0. On 82 minutes Police FC Md Eshanur Rahman showed red card and sent off him. On 87 minutes a goal by Eleta Kingsley made scoreline 3–0 and Bashundhara Kings got full three points.

On 24 February Bangladesh Police FC defeated 2–0 goals Uttar Baridhara SC in the away match. In the first half both team played competitive football and they have ended first half goalless. In the second half on 73 minutes Md Faisal Ahmed Shitol goal took lead Bangladesh Police FC made score 1–0 and on 88 minutes Amredin Sharifi extended it 2–0 for Police FC and they have finished the game with three points.

=== March ===
On 2 March Bangladesh Police FC won by 1–0 against Muktijoddha Sangsad KC at home ground.

On 7 March Bangladesh Police FC defeated Swadhinata KS by 4–2 goals at home venue.

On 12 March Bangladesh Police FC defeated Rahmatganj MFS by 2–1 goals in the away game.

On 18 March Bangladesh Police FC drew 1–1 goals versus Sheikh Russel KC at home ground.

=== April ===
On 4 April Bangladesh Police FC drew versus Dhaka Mohammedan with score 0–0 in the away game.

On 8 April Bangladesh Police FC lost against Chittagong Abahani by 1–2 goals at home ground.

On 25 April Bangladesh Police FC have lost by 1–6 goals at home venue against Saif Sporting Club.

=== May ===
On 7 May Bangladesh Police FC defeated Sheikh Jamal DC by 1–0 goal at home game.

On 12 May Bangladesh Police FC have lost versus Bashundhara Kings by 1–2 goals at home match.

=== June ===
On 22 June Bangladesh Police FC got victory by 3–2 goals against Uttar Baridhara Club at home ground.

On 29 June Bangladesh Police FC have beat Muktijoddha Sangsad KC by 4–1 goals in the away game.

=== July ===
On 4 July Bangladesh Police FC have won by 1–0 goal versus Swadhinata KS in the away match.

== Current squad ==
Bangladesh Police FC squad for 2021–22 season.

As of 25 December 2021

Note: Flags indicate national team as defined under FIFA eligibility rules; some limited exceptions apply. Players may hold more than one non-FIFA nationality.

No.	Pos.	Nation	Player
1	GK	BAN	Dinaj Hosen Jubed
2	DF	BAN	Mohammad Rocky
3	DF	BAN	Rashedul Alam Moni
4	DF	BRA	Danilo Quipapá (Captain)
6	MF	BAN	Monaem Khan Raju
7	FW	BAN	M S Bablu
8	MF	BRA	Denilson Rodrigues Roldão
9	FW	AFG	Amredin Sharifi
11	MF	BAN	Faisal Ahmed
12	FW	BAN	Arifur Rahman Raju
13	FW	BAN	Atikur Rahman Atik
14	MF	BAN	Shahedul Alam Shahed
15	MF	BAN	Shamim Ahmed
16	MF	BAN	Noman Ahmed Rubel
17	DF	BAN	Isa Faysal
18	MF	BAN	Saifur Rahman Asif
19	DF	BAN	Rabiul Islam

No.	Pos.	Nation	Player
20	FW	BAN	Amirul Islam
21	MF	BAN	Mohidul Islam
22	GK	BAN	Ariful Islam
25	DF	BAN	Ismail Hossen
27	FW	BAN	Faisal Ahmed Shitol
28	FW	BAN	Mohammad Al Amim
29	FW	BAN	Robel Junior
31	GK	BAN	Mohammad Nehal
33	DF	BAN	Akibur Rahman
37	DF	BAN	Esanur Rahman
38	DF	BAN	Rasel Hossain
39	MF	CIV	Christian Kouakou
40	FW	BAN	Rashedul Islam Jihan
60	GK	BAN	Roni Basfor
70	DF	BAN	Raja Sheikh
60	GK	BAN	Saiful Islam Khan
77	DF	BAN	Joyonto Kumar Roy
99	MF	BAN	Umor Faruk Mithu

== Pre-season friendly ==
14 November 2021 Friendly	Bangladesh Police FC	5–0	Sherpur ZFAE	Sherpur
13:00 UTC+6		Report		Stadium: Shahid Muktijoddha Smriti Stadium

22 November 2021 Friendly	Bangladesh Police FC	2–0	Dhaka Mohammedan	Dhaka
13:00 UTC+6	Amir Uddin; Al Amin	Report		Stadium: BSSS Mostafa Kamal Stadium

10 January 2022 Friendly	Muktijoddha Sangsad KC	1–0	Bangladesh Police FC	Dhaka
14:00 UTC+6	Samsaldin 67'			Stadium: Bangladesh Army Stadium

19 January 2022 Friendly	Bangladesh Police FC	2–1	Chittagong Abahani	Dhaka
14:00				Stadium: Bangladesh Army Stadium

== Transfer ==
=== Out ===
No.	Pos	Player	Transferred to	Fee	Date	Source
11	FW	(Bangladesh) Aikur Rahman Mahi	(Bangladesh) Saif Sporting Club	Free transfer	31 August 2021	
6	MF	(Bangladesh) Nazmul Islam Rasel	(Bangladesh) Saif Sporting Club	Free transfer	22 October 2021	

=== In ===
No.	Pos	Player	Previous club	Fee	Date	Source
14	MF	(Bangladesh) Sahedul Alam Junior	(Bangladesh) Rahmatganj MFS	Free transfer	18 September 2021	
8	DF	(Brazil) Danilo Quipapá	(India) NEROCA FC	Free transfer	4 November 2021	
9	FW	(Afghanistan) Amredin Sharifi	(Kyrgyzstan) FC Neftchi Kochkor-Ata	Free transfer	22 November 2021	
7	MF	(Ivory Coast) Maximin Djawa	(Myanmar) Yadanarbon FC	Not disclosed	14 April 2022	
	LW/RW	(Bangladesh) Saqlain Chowdhury	(Bangladesh) Sheikh Jamal DC	Not disclosed	14 April 2022	

=== Released ===
No.	Position	Player	Date	Source
10	MF	(Morocco) Adil Kouskous	20 April 2022	
26	MF	(Brazil) Denilson Rodrigues Roldão	20 April 2022	

== Competitions ==
Win Draw Loss Fixtures

=== Overall ===
Competition	First match	Last match	Final Position
BPL	4 February 2022	1 August 2022	8th
Federation Cup	26 December 2021	28 December 2021	Group stages
Independence Cup	30 November 2021	14 December 2021	Semi-finals

=== Overview ===
Competition	Record							
Competition	Pld	W	D	L	GF	GA	GD	Win %
BPL	22	8	6	8	28	34	−6	36.36
Federation Cup	2	0	1	1	1	3	−2	0.00
Independence Cup	5	1	2	2	4	5	−1	20.00
Total	29	9	9	11	33	42	−9	31.03

Source: Competitions

=== Independence Cup ===
==== Group D ====
Pos	Team	Pld	W	D	L	GF	GA	GD	Pts	Status
1	Bashundhara Kings	3	3	0	0	10	0	+10	9	Qualified for Knockout stage
2	Bangladesh Police FC	3	0	2	1	2	3	−1	2	Qualified for Knockout stage
3	Chittagong Abahani	3	0	2	1	2	5	−3	2	
4	Bangladesh Navy	3	0	2	1	2	8	−6	2	

Source: Global Sports Archive
Rules for classification: Group stage tiebreakers

30 November 2021	Chittagong Abahani	1–1	Bangladesh Police FC	Dhaka
16:00 BST (UTC+6)	Peter 58' (pen.)	Report	Denilson 48'	Stadium: BSSS Mostafa Kamal Stadium; Referee: Md Mizanur Rahman

4 December 2021	Bangladesh Police FC	0–1	Bashundhara Kings	Dhaka
16:00 BST (UTC+6)		Report	Robinho 16' (pen.)	Stadium: BSSS Mostafa Kamal Stadium; Referee: Anisur Rahman Sagor

8 December 2021	Bangladesh Police FC	1–1	Bangladesh Navy	Dhaka
16:00 BST (UTC+6)	Bablu 51'	Report	Sharifi 72' (o.g.)	Stadium: BSSS Mostafa Kamal Stadium; Referee: Mahmud Zamil Farouqee Nahid

==== Knockout stage ====
12 December 2021 Quarter-finals	Sheikh Russel KC	0–1	Bangladesh Police FC	Dhaka
17:15 BST (UTC+6)		Report	Sharifi 4'	Stadium: BSSS Mostafa Kamal Stadium; Referee: Md Mizanur Rahman

14 December 2021 Semi-finals	Bangladesh Police FC	1–2 (a.e.t.)	Bashundhara Kings	Dhaka
20:00 BST (UTC+6)	Quipapá 8'	Report	Ibrahim 30'; Arafat 119'	Stadium: BSSS Mostafa Kamal Stadium; Referee: Md Alamgir Sarkar

=== Federation Cup ===
==== Group C ====
Pos	Team	Pld	W	D	L	GF	GA	GD	Pts	Status
1	Saif Sporting Club	2	1	1	0	3	2	+1	4	Advance to Knockout stage
2	Chittagong Abahani	2	1	0	1	3	2	+1	3	Advance to Knockout stage
3	Bangladesh Police FC	2	0	1	1	1	3	−2	1	

Source: Soccerway
Rules for classification: Group stage tiebreakers

26 December 2022	Bangladesh Police FC	1–1	Saif Sporting Club	Dhaka
16:00 BST (UTC+6)	Sharifi 90+2'	Report	Emery 55' (pen.)	Stadium: BSSS Mostafa Kamal Stadium; Referee: Saymoon Hasan Sany

28 December 2022	Bangladesh Police FC	0–2	Chittagong Abahani	Dhaka
16:00 BST (UTC+6)		Report	Arifur 24'; Twala 60'	Stadium: BSSS Mostafa Kamal Stadium; Referee: Md Alamgir Sarkar

=== Premier League ===
==== League table ====
Pos	Team	Pld	W	D	L	GF	GA	GD	Pts
6	Sheikh Russel KC	22	8	7	7	35	31	+4	31
7	Chittagong Abahani	22	8	7	7	39	42	−3	31
8	Bangladesh Police FC	22	8	6	8	28	32	−4	30
9	Muktijoddha Sangsad KC	22	5	4	13	27	42	−15	19
10	Rahmatganj MFS	22	4	6	12	33	46	−13	18

Source: Soccerway
Rules for classification: 1) Points; 2) Goal difference; 3) Goals scored.

==== Results summary ====
Overall								Home						Away					
Pld	W	D	L	GF	GA	GD	Pts	W	D	L	GF	GA	GD	W	D	L	GF	GA	GD
22	8	6	8	28	32	−4	30	5	4	3	16	17	−1	3	2	5	12	15	−3

Source: Soccerway

==== Results by round ====
Round	1	2	3	4	5	6	7	8	9	10	11	12	13	14	15	16	17	18	19	20	21	22
Ground	A	H	A	A	A	H	H	A	H	A	H	H	A	H	H	H	A	H	H	A	H	A
Result	L	D	D	L	W	W	W	W	D	D	L	L	L	W	L	W	W	W	D	L	D	L
Position	11	9	9	10	8	7	5	4	4	5	6	7	7	7	7	7	7	5	6	6	6	8

Source: Matches
A = Away; H = Home; W = Win; D = Draw; L = Loss; P = Postponed

=== Matches ===
4 February 2022 1	Saif Sporting Club	1–0	Bangladesh Police FC	Munshigonj
15:00 BST (UTC+6)	M. Hossain (yellow card) 71'; E. Bayisenge 90+2'	Report		Stadium: Munshigonj District Stadium; Referee: Md Mizanur Rahman

8 February 2022 2	Bangladesh Police FC	1–1	Dhaka Abahani	Munshigonj
15:00 BST (UTC+6)	I. Faysal (yellow card) 42'; M. Nehal (yellow card) 45'; Danilo 76' (yellow card) 89'; Monaem Khan Raju (yellow card) 78'; N. Rubel (yellow card) 78'	Report	Rakib (yellow card) 63'; Dorielton 90+3'	Stadium: Munshigonj District Stadium; Referee: Md Symoon Hasan

12 February 2022 3	Sheikh Jamal DC	0–0	Bangladesh Police FC	Munshigonj
15:00 BST (UTC+6)	Yeasin (yellow card) 57'; Valizhonov (yellow card) 79' (yellow-red card) 81'	Report	Rashedul (yellow card) 24'; Faisal (yellow card) 63'; Danilo (yellow card) 79'	Stadium: Munshigonj District Stadium; Referee: Golam Mourshed Chowdhury

17 February 2022 4	Bashundhara Kings	3–0	Bangladesh Police FC	Dhaka
15:00 BST (UTC+6)	Shafiei (yellow card) 45+2'; Robinho 66', 77' (pen.); Eleta 87'	Report	Esanur (yellow card) 66' (red card) 82'; Monaem (yellow card) 79'; Al Amin (yellow card) 83'	Stadium: Bashundhara Kings Arena; Referee: Md Anisur Rahman

24 February 2022 5	Uttar Baridhara Club	0–2	Bangladesh Police FC	Gopalganj
15:00 BST (UTC+6)	Foziliv (yellow card) 18'; Papon (yellow card) 21'	Report	Monaem (yellow card) 20'; Shitol 73'; Rockey (yellow card) 80'; Sharafi (yellow card) 18' (goal) 88'	Stadium: Sheikh Fazlul Haque Mani Stadium; Referee: Mohammed Jalaluddin

2 March 2022 6	Bangladesh Police FC	1–0	Muktijoddha Sangsad KC	Rajshahi
15:00 BST (UTC+6)	Kouskous 44'	Report	Mahi (yellow card) 90+2'	Stadium: Rajshahi District Stadium; Referee: Golam Mourshed Chowdhury Nayon

7 March 2022 7	Bangladesh Police FC	4–2	Swadhinata KS	Rajshahi
15:30 BST (UTC+6)	Kouskous 26'; Sharafi 44' (pen.), 61', 78'	Report	Salim (yellow card) 42'; Rafał 53'; Nedo 81' (pen.)	Stadium: Rajshahi District Stadium; Referee: Md Alamgir Sarker

12 March 2022 8	Rahmatganj MFS	1–2	Bangladesh Police FC	Sylhet
15:00 BST (UTC+6)	Philip (yellow card) 85'; Sunday 89' (yellow card) 94'	Report	Kouskous 11'; Joyonto (yellow card) 41'; Denilson (yellow card) 85'; Danilo 90+5' (pen.)	Stadium: Sylhet District Stadium; Referee: Md Symoon Hasan

18 March 2022 9	Bangladesh Police FC	1–1	Sheikh Russel KC	Rajshahi
15:30 BST (UTC+6)	Kouskous 70' (pen.); Monaem (yellow card) 81'; Rashedul (yellow card) 88'	Report	Jewel 49'	Stadium: Rajshahi District Stadium; Referee: Bituraj Barua

4 April 2022 10	Dhaka Mohammedan	0–0	Bangladesh Police FC	Comilla
15:30 BST (UTC+6)		Report	Al-Amin (yellow card) 61'	Stadium: Comilla Stadium; Referee: Bituraj Barua

8 April 2022	Bangladesh Police FC	1–2	Chittagong Abahani	Rajshahi
15:30 BST (UTC+6)	Al Amin 2'; Kumar Joy (yellow card) 5'; Danilo; (yellow card) 21': Al Amin (yellow card) 45+3'; M. Khan (yellow card) 47'; Shamim (yellow card) 90'	Report	Popalzay (yellow card) 59'; Peter 84'; Anifowoshe 86'; Koushik (yellow card) 88'	Stadium: Rajshahi District Stadium; Referee: Bhubon Mohon Torafder

25 April 2022 12	Bangladesh Police FC	1–6	Saif Sporting Club	Rajshahi
15:30 BST (UTC+6)	Djawa 45+2'	Report	Mfon 25'; Emeka 31'; Gafurov 39', 69'; Fahim 78'; Sazzad 82'	Stadium: Rajshahi District Stadium; Referee: Anisur Rahman

30 April 2022 13	Dhaka Abahani	2–1	Bangladesh Police FC	Sylhet
15:45 BST (UTC+6)	Jewel 22', 68'	Report	Al Amin 17'; Joyonto (yellow card) 44'	Stadium: Sylhet District Stadium; Referee: Alamgir Sarker

2022 14	Bangladesh Police FC	1–0	Sheikh Jamal DC	Rajshahi
15:45 BST (UTC+6)	Bablu 62'	Report	Shakil (yellow card) 90+4'	Stadium: Rajshahi District Stadium; Referee: Mizanur Rahman

12 May 2022 15	Bangladesh Police FC	1–2	Bashundhara Kings	Rajshahi
15:45 BST (UTC+6)	Monaem (yellow card) 14'; Danilo (yellow card) 40' (goal) 81'		Miguel 12', 30'; Bishwanath (yellow card) 81'	Stadium: Rajshahi District Stadium; Referee: Golam Mourshed Chowdhury Nayon

22 June 2022 16	Bangladesh Police FC	3–2	Uttar Baridhara Club	Rajshahi
16:00 BST (UTC+6)	Rockey (yellow card) 8'; Amiruddin 14', 52'; Bablu (yellow card) 36'; Danilo 47'	Report	Youssouf 69'; Kochnev 90+1'	Stadium: Rajshahi District Stadium; Referee: Bhubon Mohon Tarafder

29 June 2022 17	Muktijoddha Sangsad KC	1–4	Bangladesh Police FC	Gopalganj
15:30 BST (UTC+6)	Didarul (yellow card) 27'; Aboubacar (yellow card) 56'; Abdallah 18'	Report	Kouakou 3', 26'; Bablu 44', 90+1'	Stadium: Sheikh Fazlul Haque Mani Stadium; Referee: Mohammed Nasiruddin

4 July 2022 18	Bangladesh Police FC	1–0	Swadhinata KS	Rajshahi
15:30 BST (UTC+6)	Amiruddin 71' (pen.); Monaem (yellow card) 80'	Report	Murad (yellow card) 69'	Stadium: Rajshahi District Stadium; Referee: Md Alamgir Sarker

15 July 2022 19	Bangladesh Police FC	0–0	Rahmatganj MFS	Rajshahi
16:00 BST (UTC+6)		Report	Ashraful (yellow card) 33'	Stadium: Rajshahi District Stadium; Referee: Mohammed Nasir Uddin

21 July 2022 20	Sheikh Russel KC	4–1	Bangladesh Police FC	Dhaka
16:00 BST (UTC+6)	Akinade 45', 56'; Richard 45+4'; Brossou 70'	Report	Amredin 51'; Danilo (yellow card) 69'	Stadium: Bashundhara Kings Arena; Referee: Anisur Rahman

27 July 2022 21	Bangladesh Police FC	1–1	Dhaka Mohammedan	Rajshahi
16:00 BST (UTC+6)	Kouakou 32'; Faisal (yellow card) 48'; Joyonto (yellow card) 83'	Report	Souleymane 28'	Stadium: Rajshahi District Stadium; Referee: Bhubon Mohon Tarafder

1 August 2022 22	Chittagong Abahani	3–2	Bangladesh Police FC	Cumilla
16:00 BST (UTC+6)	Peter Ebi 29', 61'; Shohel (yellow card) 39', (red card) 77'; Candy 49', (yellow card) 87'	Report	Kouakou 10', (yellow card) 26', (red card) 77'; D. Djawa (yellow card) 18'; R. Moni (yellow card) 32'; Sharifi 78' (pen.)	Stadium: Shaheed Dhirendranath Datta Stadium; Referee: Bituraj Barua

== Statistics ==
=== Goalscorers ===
As of match played till 1 August 2022

Rank	Player	Position	Total	BPL	Independence Cup	Federation Cup
1	(Afghanistan) Amredin Sharifi	FW	11	9	1	1
2	(Brazil) Danilo Quipapá	MF	5	4	1	0
3	(Bangladesh) M S Bablu	FW	4	3	1	0
3	(Morocco) Adil Kouskous	MF	4	4	0	0
3	(Ivory Coast) Christian Kouakou	MF	4	4	0	0
4	(Bangladesh) Al Amin	FW	2	2	0	0
5	(Bangladesh) Faisal Ahmed Shitol	FW	1	1	0	0
5	(Brazil) Denilson Rodrigues Roldão	MF	1	0	1	0
5	(Ivory Coast) Maximin Djawa	MF	1	1	0	0
Total			33	28	4	1

Source: Matches
