= 2021–22 Sheikh Russel KC season =

Sheikh Russel KC
2021–22 season
- President: Sayem Sobhan Anvir
- Head coach: Saiful Bari Titu
- Stadium: Bashundhara Kings Arena
- Bangladesh Premier League: 6th of 12
- Federation Cup: Quarter-finals
- Independence Cup: Quarter-finals
- Top goalscorer: League: Aizar Akmatov; Ismahil Akinade (6 goals each); All: Aizar Akmatov (7 goals)
- Biggest win: 5–3 Vs Uttar Baridhara Club (3 July 2022)
- Biggest defeat: 3–4 Vs Rahmatganj MFS (3 January 2022)
Home colours	Away colours

The 2021–22 season was Sheikh Russel KC's 27th overall since its establishment in 1995 and their 15th season in the Bangladesh Premier League. In addition to the domestic league, Sheikh Russel participated in the season's edition of the Federation Cup and Independence Cup. The season covered the period from 1 October 2021 to 2 August 2022.

== Season overview ==
=== June ===
On 21 June 2021 Sheikh Russell KC football committee re-elected Sayem Sobhan Anvir as a club chairman. He indicated that the club will play for upcoming season for the trophy and they will buy some star foreign players.

=== November ===
On 27 November Sheikh Russel KC defeated Uttar Baridhara SC by 1–0 in their inaugural match of the season. Winning scorers of the match Mannaf Rabbi who found the net on 58 minutes and left the field ensured victory.

=== December ===
On 1 December Sheikh Russel KC played second game of their group against Bangladesh Air Force Football Team and they have defeated by 2–0 goals. Ailton Machado two goals secured their comfortable win.

On 5 December Sheikh Russel KC have draw 1–1 goals versus Sheikh Jamal DC. On 26 minutes Sheikh Jamal DC defender Sahin Mia goal took lead but they couldn't hold it for long on 28 minutes Guinean forward Esmaël Gonçalves equalized scored.

On 12 December Sheikh Russel KC defeated by 0–1 goals against Bangladesh Police FC. 4 minutes of first half goal by Afghan forward Amredin Sharifi took lead Bangladesh Police FC. In the 41 minutes referee Md Mizanur Rahman showed red card to Monaem Khan Razu & they finished first with 10 mens squad. In the half on 59 minutes Hemanta Vincent Biswas charged red card and they ended full time 9 players team. Sheikh Russel KC eliminated from the competition.

On 27 December Sheikh Russel KC won 3–0 goals against Uttar Baridhara Club by FIFA Walkover laws. The match scheduled to play following date but the opposition club withdrew their name from the tournament. The match commissioner declared Sheikh Russel KC winner of the match with full 3 point.

On 29 December Sheikh Russel KC draw 2–2 goals against Dhaka Abahani. In the First half on 8 minutes goal by Dorielton took lead Dhaka Abahani but after 12 minutes Mannaf Rabbi level the score for Sheikh Russel KC. In the second half again Dhaka Abahani took lead on 61 minutes second goal of Dorielton. In the 84 minutes Ailton Machado goal level the score 2–2 and end the match with draw. But due to withdrawn Uttar Baridhara Club participation in the tournament both teams' points were equal and referee were used penalties shoot out to decided group champion which Sheikh Russel KC won 13–12.

=== January ===
On 3 January Sheikh Russel KC lost 3–4 goals versus Rahmatganj MFS. In the first half Rahmatganj MFS Philip Adjah two goals on 28, 45 minutes finished first half with score 2–0. In the second half fought back Sheikh Russel KC Thiago Amaral score on 63 minutes made scored 2–1. In the 82 minutes Aizar Akmatov penalty goal and Ailton Machado on 84 minutes made the score 3–2. In the 89 minutes Rahmatganj Nigerian Sunday Chizoba level the scoreline 3–3. In the extra time on 118 minutes goal by Khondoker Ashraful Islam secured Rahmatganj MFS Semi-finals race.

=== February ===
On 5 February Sheikh Russel KC drew 1–1 goals against Dhaka Mohammedan in the away match. On 24 minutes a Souleyman Diabate goal took lead Dhaka Mohammedan. Md Saad Uddin was shown a red card on 24 minutes due to bad foul. Sheikh Russel KC finished first half with 0–1 goal. In the second half on 67 minutes Md Masud Rana Dhaka Mohammedan was shown red and sent him off and both teams played ten men squads. On 84 minutes a Aizar Akmatov goal levelled the score 1–1 goals Sheikh Russel KC.

On 9 February Sheikh Russel KC has drawn 1–1 goals against Chittagong Abahani in their home match. In the first half on 20 minutes a goal by Mohammad Jewel took lead 1–0 goal but Chittagong Abahani Peter Ebimobowei goal on 33 minutes leveled the score 1–1 goals until finished halftime. In the second half both players playing defensive football but no one has any score until the match got over 1–1 drew.

On 13 February Sheikh Russel KC won by 1–0 goal in away game against Saif Sporting Club. In the first half on 39 minutes a penalty goal by defender Aizar Akmatov took lead and finished half time. In the second half Sheikh Russel KC tried to extended the lead but Saif Sports Club also tried to equalized score but they won't able to do it. Sheikh Russel KC have left the field with full three points.

On 18 February Sheikh Russel KC defeated 3–1 goals to Dhaka Abahani at home match. In the first halftime both teams has played goalless. In the second half on 49 minutes Jewel Rana open account for Dhaka Abahani and second goals on 61 minutes by Milad Sheykh Soleimani made score 2–0. On 64 minutes goal by Esmaël Gonçalves made score 2–1 and Nabib Newaj Jibon goal on 84 minutes Dhaka Abahani secured win the game.

On 23 February Sheikh Russel KC lost to Sheikh Jamal DC by 0–1 goal in the away ground. In the first half on 33 minutes Nigerian forward Matthew Chinedu goal took lead and finished halftime with 1–0 lead. In the second half both teama play goalless and Sheikh Jamal DC secured win with 3 points.

On 28 February Sheikh Russel KC lost to 0–1 goal against Bashundhara Kings in the home match. In the first half both teams has play competitive football and they have finished 0–0 score first half of the match. In the second part of the match on 83 minutes a penalty goal by Brazilian star Robson goal gave victory for Bashundhara Kings by 1–0.

=== March ===
On 6 March Sheikh Russel KC lost by 3–2 goals against Uttar Baridhara Club in the away game. On 7 minutes Aizar Akmatov and on 11 minutes goals by Esmaël Gonçalves took early 2–0 lead Sheikh Russel KC. On 39 minutes Saiddoston Fozilov and after a minutes goal by Sujon Biswas equalized score 2–2 goals before called for halftime break. In the second half additional time 90+3 minutes Sujon Biswas secured victory for Uttar Baridhara Club by 3–2 goals.

On 12 March Sheikh Russel KC lost by 0–3 goals versus Muktijoddha Sangsad KC at home ground. In the first half on 22 minutes Muktijoddha Sangsad KC Japanese forward Soma Otani introduced first goal for Muktijoddha Sangsad KC and they have finished halftime. In the second half on 54 minutes Didarul Alam goals make scoreline 2–0. On 81 minutes Aminur Rahman Sajib goals thrashed Sheikh Russel KC by 3–0 goals and Muktijoddha Sangsad KC got three points.

On 18 March Sheikh Russel KC have drew against Bangladesh Police FC by 1–1 goals in the away match.

=== April ===
On 4 April Sheikh Russel KC drew against Rahmatganj MFS by 1–1 goals at home. On 4 minutes goal by a goal by Nigerian forward Sunday Chizoba Rahmatganj MFS took early lead but between one minutes goal by Mohammad Jewel Sheikh Russel KC equalized score 1–1 and they have finished first halftime. In the second 45 minutes both teams play goalless until end the game.

On 9 April Sheikh Russel KC defeated Swadhinata KS by 2–1 goals at home ground. On 13 Minutes defender Manik Hossain Molla and on 20 minutes penalty goal by Tajikistan defender Aizar Akmatov goal took lead by 2–0 score and finished first halftime. In the second halftime before referee added extra both teams were not found net but on 90+3 minutes a goal by Uzbekistan defender Nodir Mavlonov Swadhinata KS reduced score to 2–1.

On 13 April Sheikh Russel KC has signed with Nigerian forward Ismahil Akinade and Ivory Coastian midfielder Didier Brossou to join rest of the season matches.

On 29 April Sheikh Russel KC have won by 2–1 goals versus Chittagong Abahani in the away game.

=== May ===
On 7 May Sheikh Russel KC have lost by 0–1 goal against Saif Sporting Club at home ground.

On 12 May Sheikh Russel KC have drew against Dhaka Abahani by 1–1 in the away game.

=== June ===
On 21 June Sheikh Russel KC have won versus Sheikh Jamal DC by 3–1 goals at home game.

On 26 June Sheikh Russel KC have defeated against table topper Bashundhara Kings by 2–3 goals in the away match.

=== July ===
On 3 July Sheikh Russel KC have won by 5–3 goals against Uttar Baridhara Club at home game.

On 15 July Sheikh Russel KC have drawn with score 0–0 in the away match against Muktijoddha Sangsad KC.

On 21 July Sheikh Russel KC have beat Bangladesh Police FC by 4–1 goals at home venue.

On 27 July Sheikh Russel KC have won 3–2 goals versus Rahmatganj MFS in the away ground.

=== August ===
On 2 August Sheikh Russel KC have won by 4–1 goals against Swadhinata KS in the away match.

== Current squad ==
Sheikh Russel KC squad for 2021–22 season.

As of 22 April 2022

Note: Flags indicate national team as defined under FIFA eligibility rules; some limited exceptions apply. Players may hold more than one non-FIFA nationality.

No.	Pos.	Nation	Player
1	GK	BAN	Ashraful Islam Rana (Captain)
3	DF	BAN	Rahmat Mia
4	DF	BAN	Assaduzzaman Bablu
5	DF	BAN	Nasiruddin Chowdhury
6	DF	BAN	Habibur Rahman Sohag
7	DF	BAN	Khalekurzaman Sabuj
8	MF	BAN	Mohammad Abdullah
10	MF	BAN	Hemanta Vincent Biswas
11	FW	BAN	Mannaf Rabby
12	MF	BAN	Fahim Ahmed
13	GK	BAN	Ibrahim Hossain
14	MF	BAN	Manik Hossain Molla
15	DF	BAN	Apurbo Mali
16	MF	BAN	Emon Islam Babu
17	MF	BAN	Salman Khan

No.	Pos.	Nation	Player
18	DF	BAN	Rabiul Alam
19	FW	BAN	Mohammad Jewel
20	FW	NGR	Ismahil Akinade
21	DF	BAN	Mohammad Emon
22	FW	BAN	Md Saad Uddin
23	DF	BAN	Rostam Islam Dukhu Mia
24	MF	BAN	Dipok Roy
25	GK	BAN	Russel Mahmud Liton
26	MF	BAN	MD Didarul Islam
27	MF	BAN	Golam Rabby
29	DF	BAN	Rashedul Islam Rashed
30	GK	BAN	Sabuj Das Roghu
34	DF	KGZ	Aizar Akmatov
43	FW	GHA	Richard Gadze
88	MF	CIV	Kpehi Didier Brossou

== Transfer ==
=== In ===
No.	Pos	Player	Previous club	Fee	Date	Source
3	DF	(Bangladesh) Rahmat Mia	(Bangladesh) Saif Sporting Club	Free transfer	10 November 2021	
5	DF	(Bangladesh) Nasiruddin Chowdhury	(Bangladesh) Abahani Limited Dhaka	Free transfer	10 November 2021	
6	DF	(Bangladesh) Habibur Rahman Sohag	(Bangladesh) Dhaka Mohammedan	Free transfer	28 August 2021	
9	MF	(Brazil) Thiago Amaral	(Indonesia) Persipura Jayapura	Free transfer	10 November 2021	
11	FW	(Bangladesh) Mannaf Rabby	(Bangladesh) Chittagong Abahani Limited	Free transfer	30 August 2021	
14	MF	(Bangladesh) Manik Hossain Molla	(Bangladesh) Chittagong Abahani	Free transfer	30 August 2021	
19	FW	(Bangladesh) Mohammad Jewel	Bangladesh Police FC	Free transfer	30 August 2021	
21	DF	(Bangladesh) Mohammad Emon	(Bangladesh) Muktijoddha Sangsad KC	Free transfer	3 September 2021	
22	FW	(Bangladesh) Saad Uddin	(Bangladesh) Abahani Limited Dhaka	Free transfer	25 November 2021	
24	MF	(Bangladesh) Dipok Roy	(Bangladesh) Abahani Limited Dhaka	Free transfer	10 November 2021	
25	GK	(Bangladesh) Russel Mahmud Liton	(Bangladesh) Rahmatganj MFS	Free transfer	17 September 2021	
34	DF	(Kyrgyzstan) Aizar Akmatov	(Kyrgyzstan) FC Dordoi Bishkek	Free transfer	16 November 2021	
77	FW	(Guinea-Bissau) Esmaël Gonçalves	(India) Chennaiyin FC	Free transfer	17 November 2021	
94	MF	(Brazil) Ailton Machado	(Thailand) Kasetsart F.C.	Free transfer	17 November 2021	
8	FW	(Ivory Coast) Kpehi Didier Brossou	(Bangladesh) Chittagong Abahani	Not disclosed	12 April 2022	
24	FW	(Nigeria) Ismahil Akinade	(Vietnam) Hong Linh Ha Tinh FC	Not disclosed	12 April 2022	
–	FW	(Ghana) Richard Gadze	(Israel) Bnei Sakhnin F.C.	Not disclosed	21 April 2022	

=== Out ===
No.	Pos	Player	Transferred to	Fee	Date	Source
2	DF	(Tajikistan) Siyovush Asrorov	(Bangladesh) Rahmatganj MFS	Free transfer	25 November 2021	
9	FW	(Brazil) Giancarlo Rodrigues	Free agent	Free transfer	25 November 2021	
15	DF	(Bangladesh) Yeamin Munna	(Bangladesh) Muktijoddha Sangsad KC	Free transfer	17 September 2021	
20	MF	(Kyrgyzstan) Bakhtiyar Duyshobekov	Free agent	Free transfer	17 September 2021	
16	MF	(Nigeria) Ugochukwu Obi Moneke	(Bangladesh) Dhaka Mohammedan	Free transfer	31 October 2021	
19	DF	(Bangladesh) Khondoker Ashraful Islam	(Bangladesh) Rahmatganj MFS	Free transfer	17 September 2021	

=== Released ===
No.	Position	Player	Date	Source
9	FW	(Brazil) Thiago Amaral	19 April 2022	
77	FW	(Guinea) Esmaël Gonçalves	19 April 2022	
94	MF	(Brazil) Ailton Machado	19 April 2022	

== Competitions ==
Win Draw Loss Fixtures

=== Overall ===
Competition	First match	Last match	Final Position
BPL	5 February 2022	2 August 2022	6th of 12
Federation Cup	27 December 2021	3 January 2022	Quarter-finals
Independence Cup	27 November 2021	12 December 2021	Quarter-finals

=== Overview ===
Competition	Record							
Competition	Pld	W	D	L	GF	GA	GD	Win %
BPL	22	8	7	7	35	31	+4	36.36
Independence Cup	4	2	1	1	4	2	+2	50.00
Federation Cup	3	1	1	1	8	6	+2	33.33
Total	29	11	9	9	47	39	+8	37.93

Source: Competitions

=== Federation Cup ===
==== Group B ====
Pos	Team	Pld	W	D	L	GF	GA	GD	Pts	Status
1	Sheikh Russel KC	2	1	1	0	5	2	+3	4 (Note: As the fair play points of the two teams were equal, the group champion and runners-up were determined through a penalty shootout. Sheikh Russel KC (13–12) Dhaka Abahani.)	Advance to Knockout stage
2	Dhaka Abahani	2	1	1	0	5	2	+3	4	Advance to Knockout stage
3	Uttar Baridhara Club	2	0	0	2	0	6	−6	0	Later withdrew

Source: Soccerway
Rules for classification: Group stage tiebreakers
Notes:

27 December 2022	Sheikh Russel KC	3–0; Walkover	Uttar Baridhara Club	Dhaka
18:45 BST (UTC+6)		Report		Stadium: BSSS Mostafa Kamal Stadium
Note: Sheikh Russel KC were awarded walkover win by 3 goals since Uttar Baridhara didn't turn up for the match

29 December 2022	Dhaka Abahani	2–2 (12–13 p)	Sheikh Russel KC	Dhaka
16:00 BST (UTC+6)	Dorielton 8', 61'	Report	Rabbi 20'; Ailton 84'	Stadium: BSSS Mostafa Kamal Stadium; Referee: Mohammed Jalaluddin

==== Knockout stage ====
3 January 2022 Quarter-finals	Sheikh Russel KC	3–4 (a.e.t.)	Rahmatganj MFS	Dhaka
16:30 BST (UTC+6)	Amaral 63'; Akmatov 82' (pen.); Ailton 84'	Report	Adjah 28', 45'; Sunday 89'; Ashraful 118'	Stadium: BSSS Mostafa Kamal Stadium; Referee: Bituraj Borua

=== Independence Cup ===
==== Group B ====
Pos	Team	Pld	W	D	L	GF	GA	GD	Pts	Status
1	Sheikh Russel KC	3	2	1	0	4	1	+3	7	Qualified for Knockout stage
2	Sheikh Jamal DC	3	1	2	0	4	1	+3	5	Qualified for Knockout stage
3	Uttar Baridhara Club	3	0	2	1	1	2	−1	2	
4	Bangladesh Air Force	3	0	1	2	1	6	−5	1	

Source: Global Sports Archive
Rules for classification: Group stage tiebreakers

27 November 2021	Sheikh Russel KC	1–0	Uttar Baridhara Club	Dhaka
15:30	Mannaf 58'	Report		Stadium: BSSS Mostafa Kamal Stadium; Referee: Bituraj Barua

1 December 2021	Bangladesh Air Force	0–2	Sheikh Russel KC	Dhaka
20:00		Report	Ailton 8', 25'	Stadium: BSSS Mostafa Kamal Stadium; Referee: Shorab Hossain

5 December 2021	Sheikh Jamal DC	1–1	Sheikh Russel KC	Dhaka
18:00	Sahin 26'	Report	Esmaël 28'	Stadium: BSSS Mostafa Kamal Stadium; Referee: Md Saymoon Hasan Sany

==== Knockout stage ====
12 December 2021 Quarter-finals	Sheikh Russel KC	0–1	Bangladesh Police FC	Dhaka
17:15 BST (UTC+6)		Report	Sharifi 4'	Stadium: BSSS Mostafa Kamal Stadium; Referee: Md Mizanur Rahman

=== Premier League ===
==== League table ====
Pos	Team	Pld	W	D	L	GF	GA	GD	Pts
4	Sheikh Jamal DC	22	9	8	5	34	31	+3	35
5	Dhaka Mohammedan	22	8	9	5	39	26	+13	33
6	Sheikh Russel KC	22	8	7	7	35	31	+4	31
7	Chittagong Abahani	22	8	7	7	39	42	−3	31
8	Bangladesh Police FC	22	8	6	8	28	32	−4	30

Source: Soccerway
Rules for classification: 1) Points; 2) Goal difference; 3) Goals scored.

==== Results summary ====
Overall								Home						Away					
Pld	W	D	L	GF	GA	GD	Pts	W	D	L	GF	GA	GD	W	D	L	GF	GA	GD
22	8	7	7	35	31	+4	31	4	3	4	18	17	+1	4	4	3	17	14	+3

Source: Soccerway

==== Results by round ====
Round	1	2	3	4	5	6	7	8	9	10	11	12	13	14	15	16	17	18	19	20	21	22
Ground	A	H	A	H	A	H	A	H	A	H	H	H	A	H	A	H	A	H	A	H	A	A
Result	D	D	W	L	L	L	L	L	D	D	W	D	W	L	D	W	L	W	D	W	W	W
Position	7	8	7	7	7	8	10	11	11	10	8	8	8	8	8	8	8	8	8	8	7	6

Source: Matches
A = Away; H = Home; W = Win; D = Draw; L = Loss; P = Postponed

=== Matches ===
5 February 2022 1	Dhaka Mohammedan	1–1	Sheikh Russel KC	Munshigonj
15:30 BST (UTC+6)	J. Iqbal (yellow card) 22'; S Diabate 23'; M Rana (red card) 67'; M. Mona (yellow card) 89'	Report	M.Saad (yellow card) 16' (yellow-red card) 24'; A. Akmatov 84'; E. Isma (yellow card) 89'	Stadium: Munshigonj District Stadium; Referee: Md Symoon Hasan Sany

9 February 2022 2	Sheikh Russel KC	1–1	Chittagong Abahani	Gazipur
15:30 BST (UTC+6)	Akmatov (yellow card) 16'; Jewel 20'	Report	Zahid (yellow card) 9'; Peter 33'; Kamrul (yellow card) 60'	Stadium: Shaheed Ahsan Ullah Master Stadium; Referee: Bhubon Mohon Tarafder

13 February 2022 3	Saif Sporting Club	0–1	Sheikh Russel KC	Munshigonj
15:00 BST (UTC+6)	Shakil (yellow card) 5'	Report	Akmatov 39' (pen.) (yellow card) 45+2'; Didarul (yellow card) 63'; Hemanta (yellow card) 76'; Rahmat (yellow card) 79'	Stadium: Munshigonj District Stadium; Referee: Bituraj Barua

18 February 2022 4	Sheikh Russel KC	1–3	Dhaka Abahani	Dhaka
15:00 BST (UTC+6)	Saad (yellow card) 21'; Esmaël 64'	Report	Jewel 49'; Milad 61'; Sushanto (yellow card) 76'; Jibon 84'	Stadium: Bashundhara Kings Arena; Referee: Golam Mourshed Chowdhury

23 February 2022 5	Sheikh Jamal DC	1–0	Sheikh Russel KC	Munshigonj
15:00 BST (UTC+6)	Chinedu 33' (yellow card) 90'; Mazharul (yellow card) 61'	Report	Dipok (yellow card) 10'; Akmatov (yellow card) 54'	Stadium: Munshigonj District Stadium; Referee: Mahmud Jamal Faruqee Nahid

28 February 2022 6	Sheikh Russel KC	0–1	Bashundhara Kings	Dhaka
15:00 BST (UTC+6)	Rahmat (yellow card) 59'; Jewel (yellow card) 61'; Nasiruddin (yellow card) 75'	Report	Sohel (yellow card) 74'; Robinho 83' (pen.)	Stadium: Bashundhara Kings Arena; Referee: Md Alamgir Sarker

6 March 2022 7	Uttar Baridhara Club	3–2	Sheikh Russel KC	Gopalganj
15:00 BST (UTC+6)	Fozilov 39'; Sujon 40', 90+3'; Rashid (yellow card) 45+1'; Arif (yellow card) 49'; Saful (yellow card) 86'	Report	Akmatov 7' (yellow card) 67'; Esmaël 11'; Amaral (yellow card) 35'; Rahmat (yellow card) 89'	Stadium: Sheikh Fazlul Haque Mani Stadium; Referee: Bituraj Barua

12 March 2022 8	Sheikh Russel KC	0–3	Muktijoddha Sangsad KC	Dhaka
15:00 BST (UTC+6)	Esmaël (yellow card) 44'; Amaral (yellow card) 84'; Dukhu Mia (yellow card) 84'	Report	Soma 22'; Didarul 54' (yellow card) 84'; Sajon (yellow card) 67'; Aminur 81'; Tareq (yellow card) 84'	Stadium: Bashundhara Kings Arena; Referee: Mohmmamed Jalaluddin

18 March 2022 9	Bangladesh Police FC	1–1	Sheikh Russel KC	Rajshahi
15:00 BST (UTC+6)	Kouskous 70' (pen.); Monaem (yellow card) 81'; Rashedul (yellow card) 88'	Report	Jewel 49'	Stadium: Rajshahi District Stadium; Referee: Bituraj Barua

4 April 2022 10	Sheikh Russel KC	1–1	Rahmatganj MFS	Dhaka
15:30 BST (UTC+6)	Jewel 5'	Report	Sunday 4'	Stadium: Bashundhara Kings Arena; Referee: Md Mizanur Rahman

9 April 2022 11	Sheikh Russel KC	2–1	Swadhinata KS	Dhaka
15:30 BST (UTC+6)	Manik 13'; Akmatov 20' (pen.)	Report	Murad (yellow card) 33'; Bokor (yellow card) 71'; Mavlonov 90+3'	Stadium: Bashundhara Kings Arena; Referee: Mizanur Rahman

25 April 2022 12	Sheikh Russel KC	1–1	Dhaka Mohammedan	Dhaka
15:30 BST (UTC+6)	Jewel 21'	Report	Sujon (yellow card) 22' (yellow-red card) 80'; Jafar (yellow card) 76' (goal) 88'; Masud (yellow card) 83'	Stadium: Bashundhara Kings; Referee: Golam Murshed Chowdhury Nayan

30 April 2022 13	Chittagong Abahani	1–2	Sheikh Russel KC	Cumilla
15:30 BST (UTC+6)	Zahid (yellow card) 62'; Shohel (yellow card) 71'; Yisa (yellow card) 86'; Shakawat Rony 90+6'	Report	Akinade 32'; Akmatov 51' (pen.)	Stadium: Comilla Stadium; Referee: Anisur Rahman

7 May 2022 14	Sheikh Russel KC	0–1	Saif Sporting Club	Dhaka
15:45 BST (UTC+6)		Report	Anny (yellow card) 38'; Rafi 61'; Mitul (yellow card) 67'	Stadium: Bashundhara Kings Arena; Referee: Anisur Rahman

12 May 2022 15	Dhaka Abahani	1–1	Sheikh Russel KC	Sylhet
15:00 BST (UTC+6)	Shahidul (yellow card) 28'; Mehedi 34'; Faisal (yellow card) 90+5'; Sohel (yellow card) 90+5'	Report	Rabbi (yellow card) 79'; Manik (red card) 80'; Hemanta (yellow card) 80'; Dipok (yellow card) 85' (goal) 90+6'	Stadium: Sylhet District Stadium; Referee: Anisur Rahman

21 June 2022 16	Sheikh Russel KC	3–1	Sheikh Jamal DC	Dhaka
16:00 BST (UTC+6)	Hemanta 24'; Brossou 45+1'; Didarul (yellow card) 78'; Rabby 87'; Gadze (yellow card) 88'		Otabek 42'; Najere (yellow card) 79'	Stadium: Bashundhara Kings Arena; Referee: Mohammed Jalal Uddin

26 June 2022 17	Bashundhara Kings	3–2	Sheikh Russel KC	Dhaka
16:00 BST (UTC+6)	Miguel 39'; Khaled 65'; Robinho 65'	Report	Didarul (yellow card) 6'; Akmatov 28' (pen.) (yellow card) 76'; Rabby 90+3'; Hemanta (yellow card) 64'	Stadium: Bashundhara Kings Arena; Referee: Md Saymoon Hasan

3 July 2022 18	Sheikh Russel KC	5–3	Uttar Baridhara Club	Dhaka
16:00 BST (UTC+6)	Jewel 8'; Nasir 38' (pen.); Akinade 45+6', 48'; Rabby 52'; Fahim (yellow card) 81'; Khalekuzaman (yellow card) 90+5'	Report	Papon (yellow card) 15'; Samin 39'; Maruf 63'; Sakib 82'	Stadium: Bashundhara Kings Arena; Referee: Md Symoon Hasan

15 July 2022 19	Muktijoddha Sangsad KC	0–0	Sheikh Russel KC	Gopalganj
16:00 BST (UTC+6)		Report	Hemanta (yellow card) 45+3'	Stadium: Sheikh Fazlul Haque Mani Stadium; Referee: Anwar Hossain Saju

21 July 2022 20	Sheikh Russel KC	4–1	Bangladesh Police FC	Dhaka
16:00 BST (UTC+6)	Akinade 45', 56'; Richard 45+4'; Brossou 70'	Report	Amredin 51'; Danilo (yellow card) 69'	Stadium: Bashundhara Kings Arena; Referee: Anisur Rahman

27 July 2022 21	Rahmatganj MFS	2–3	Sheikh Russel KC	Munshigonj
16:00 BST (UTC+6)	Asrorov 88', 90+4' (pen.)	Report	Richard 37' (yellow card) 53'; Dipok 66', 76'	Stadium: Munshigonj District Stadium; Referee: Sujit Das

2 August 2022 22	Swadhinata KS	1–4	Sheikh Russel KC	Rajshahi
16:00 BST (UTC+6)	Shamshud 51' (pen.)	Report	Richard 16' (yellow card) 53'; Brossou 21'; Akinade 36' (pen.); Manik 73'	Stadium: Rajshahi District Stadium; Referee: Sujit Das

== Statistics ==
=== Goalscorers ===
As of match played till 2 August 2022

Rank	Player	Position	Total	BPL	Independence Cup	Federation Cup
1	(Kyrgyzstan) Aizar Akmatov	DF	7	6	0	1
2	(Nigeria) Ismahil Akinade	FW	6	6	0	0
3	(Bangladesh) Mohammad Jewel	FW	5	5	0	0
3	(Bangladesh) Mannaf Rabbi	MF	5	3	1	1
4	(Brazil) Ailton Machado	MF	4	0	2	2
5	(Bangladesh) Dipok Roy	MF	3	3	0	0
5	(Guinea-Bissau) Esmaël Gonçalves	FW	3	2	1	0
5	(Ivory Coast) Kpehi Didier Brossou	MF	3	3	0	0
5	(Ghana) Richard Gadze	FW	3	3	0	0
6	(Bangladesh) Manik Hossain Molla	DF	2	2	0	0
7	(Bangladesh) Nasiruddin Chowdhury	DF	1	1	0	0
7	(Bangladesh) Hemanta Vincent Biswas	MF	1	1	0	0
7	(Brazil) Thiago Amaral	MF	1	0	0	1
Total			43	34	4	5

Source: Matches
