= 2021–22 Bangladesh Premier League (football) =

14th professional season of the top-flight football league in Bangladesh

Bangladesh Premier League
- Season: 2021–22
- Dates: 3 February - 2 August 2022
- Champions: Bashundhara Kings (3rd title)
- Relegated: Swadhinata KS; Baridhara (BCL)
- AFC Champions League: Bashundhara Kings
- AFC Cup: Bashundhara Kings; Dhaka Abahani
- Matches: 132
- Goals: 447 (3.39 per match)
- Top goalscorer: 21 Goals; Souleymane Diabate (Dhaka Mohammedan)
- Best goalkeeper: 11 Clean Sheets; Anisur Rahman Zico
- Biggest home win: Dhaka Mohammedan 7–0 Rahmatganj MFS (2 August 2022)
- Biggest away win: Baridhara 0–7 Saif Sporting Club (26 July 2022)
- Highest scoring: Saif Sporting Club 5–3 Uttar Baridhara Club (3 July 2022); Rahmatganj MFS 7–1 Muktijoddha Sangsad KC (4 July 2022)
- Longest winning run: 16 Matches; Bashundhara Kings
- Longest unbeaten run: 21 Matches; Bashundhara Kings
- Longest winless run: 5 Matches; Swadhinata KS
- Longest losing run: 16 Matches; Swadhinata KS

The 2021–22 Bangladesh Premier League, (Bengali: ২০২১/২২ বাংলাদেশ প্রিমিয়ার লিগ) also known as TVS Bangladesh Premier League for sponsorship reasons, was the 14th season of the Bangladesh Premier League since its establishment in 2007. A total of 12 football clubs competed in the league. The country's top-flight football competition was started from 3 February 2022.

Bashundhara Kings were the champions as 2021 season winner.

== Teams ==
=== Changes ===
Promoted from 2021 BCL	Relegated from 2021 BPL
Swadhinata KS	Brothers Union; Arambagh KS

=== Stadiums and locations ===
Locations of the 2021–22 Bangladesh Premier League teams

Team	Location	Stadium	Capacity
Bangladesh Police FC	Rajshahi	Muktijuddho Smriti Stadium	15,000
Bashundhara Kings	Dhaka	Bashundhara Kings Arena	14,000
Chittagong Abahani Ltd.	Comilla	Shaheed Dhirendranath Stadium	18,000
Dhaka Abahani Ltd.	Sylhet	Sylhet District Stadium	15,000
Dhaka Mohammedan SC Ltd.	Comilla	Shaheed Dhirendranath Stadium	18,000
Lt. Sheikh Jamal Dhanmondi Club Ltd.	Munshigonj	Bir Fl. Lt. Matiur Rahman Stadium	10,000
Muktijoddha Sangsad KC	Gopalganj	Sheikh Fazlul Haque Mani Stadium	5,000
Rahmatganj MFS	Sylhet	Sylhet District Stadium	15,000
Saif Sporting Club	Munshigonj	Bir Fl. Lt. Matiur Rahman Stadium	10,000
Sheikh Russel KC	Dhaka	Bashundhara Kings Arena	14,000
Swadhinata KS	Rajshahi	Muktijuddho Smriti Stadium	15,000
Uttar Baridhara Club	Gopalganj	Sheikh Fazlul Haque Mani Stadium	5,000

=== Personnel and kits ===
Team	Head coach	Captain	Kit manufacturer	Shirt sponsor (chest)
Bangladesh Police FC	(Romania) Aristică Cioabă	(Brazil) Danilo Quipapá		
Bashundhara Kings	(Spain) Óscar Bruzón	(Bangladesh) Topu Barman	Club manufactured kit	Bashundhara Group
Chittagong Abahani Limited	(Bangladesh) Maruful Haque	(Bangladesh) Koushik Barua		Ignite Battery
Dhaka Abahani Limited	(Portugal) Mário Lemos	(Bangladesh) Nabib Newaj Jibon	Graphics Bird	
Dhaka Mohammedan SC Limited	(Bangladesh) Shafiqul Islam Manik	(Mali) Souleymane Diabate		Orion Group
Lt.Sheikh Jamal Dhanmondi Club Limited	(Nigeria) Joseph Afusi	(The Gambia) Solomon King Konform		
Muktijoddha Sangsad KC	(Malaysia) Raja Isa	(Japan) Tetsuaki Misawa		
Rahmatganj MFS	(Bangladesh) Syed Golam Jilani	(Bangladesh) Mahmudul Hasan Kiron		Tiger Cement
Saif Sporting Club	(Argentina) Andres Cruciani	(Bangladesh) Jamal Bhuyan		Saif Power Battery
Sheikh Russel KC	(Bangladesh) Zulfiker Mahmud Mintu (Interim)	(Bangladesh) Ashraful Islam Rana	Graphics Bird	Bashundhara Cement
Swadhinata KS	(Bangladesh) Masud Alam Jahangir	(Bangladesh) Mohammad Sazal Islam		
Uttar Baridhara Club	(Bangladesh) Ali Asgar Nasir	(Bangladesh) Samin Yasar Juel		Bashundhara Group

=== Head coaching changes ===
Team	Outgoing head coach	Manner of departure	Date of vacancy	Position in table	Incoming head coach	Date of appointment
Sheikh Russel KC	(Bangladesh) Saiful Bari Titu	Sacked	13 March 2022	11th	(Bangladesh) Zulfiker Mahmud Mintu (Interim)	13 March 2022
Sheikh Jamal Dhanmondi Club	(Spain) Juan Manuel Martínez Sáez	Sacked	13 April 2022	3rd	(Nigeria) Joseph Afusi	13 April 2022
Dhaka Mohammedan	(England) Sean Lane	Resigned	29 May 2022	6th	(Bangladesh) Shafiqul Islam Manik	4 June 2022

== Foreign players ==
Other foreign players.
AFC quota players.
No foreign player registered.

Bold names refer to international players who have already played or are still playing.

Note :
(substituted off) : players who released during summer transfer window;
(substituted on) : players who registered during summer transfer window.

Club	Leg	Player 1	Player 2	Player 3	Player 4
Bangladesh Police FC	First	(Brazil) Danilo Quipapá	(Brazil) Denilson (substituted off)	(Morocco) Adil Kouskous (substituted off)	(Afghanistan) Amredin Sharifi
Bangladesh Police FC	Second		(Ivory Coast) Christian Kouakou (substituted on)	(Ivory Coast) Djedje Maximin Djawa (substituted on)	
Bashundhara Kings	First	(Bosnia and Herzegovina) Stojan Vranješ (substituted off)	(Brazil) Jonathan Fernandes (substituted off)	(Brazil) Robinho	(Iran) Khaled Shafiei
Bashundhara Kings	Second	(Brazil) Miguel Figueira (substituted on)	(The Gambia) Nuha Marong (substituted on)		
Chittagong Abahani Ltd.	First	(Nigeria) Kehinde Yisa Anifowoshe	(Nigeria) Peter Ebimobowei	(South Africa) William Twala (substituted off)	(Afghanistan) Omid Popalzay
Chittagong Abahani Ltd.	Second			(Nigeria) Candy Augustine Agbane (substituted on)	
Dhaka Abahani Ltd.	First	(Brazil) Dorielton	(Brazil) Raphael Augusto	(Costa Rica) Daniel Colindres	(Iran) Milad Sheykh Soleimani
Dhaka Abahani Ltd.	Second				
Dhaka Mohammedan SC Ltd.	First	(Mali) Souleymane Diabate	(Nigeria) Ugochukwu Obi Moneke	(North Macedonia) Jasmin Mecinovic	(Australia) Aaron Reardon
Dhaka Mohammedan SC Ltd.	Second				
Lt. Sheikh Jamal Dhanmondi Club Ltd.	First	(The Gambia) Solomon King Konform	(The Gambia) Sulayman Sillah (substituted off)	(Nigeria) Matthew Chinedu (substituted off)	(Uzbekistan) Otabek Valijonov
Lt. Sheikh Jamal Dhanmondi Club Ltd.	Second		(Nigeria) Chijoke Alaekwe (substituted on)	(Nigeria) Musa Tachi Najare (substituted on)	
Muktijoddha Sangsad KC	First	(Egypt) Ahmed Shamsaldin (substituted off)	(Guinea) Younoussa Camara (substituted off)	(Japan) Soma Otani	(Japan) Tetsuaki Misawa
Muktijoddha Sangsad KC	Second	(Burundi) Abdallah Sudi (substituted on)	(Guinea) Aboubacar Camara (substituted on)		
Rahmatganj MFS	First	(Ivory Coast) Lancine Toure	(Ghana) Philip Adjah	(Nigeria) Sunday Chizoba	(Tajikistan) Siyovush Asrorov
Rahmatganj MFS	Second				
Saif Sporting Club	First	(Nigeria) Emeka Ogbugh	(Nigeria) Mfon Udoh	(Rwanda) Emery Bayisenge	(Uzbekistan) Asror Gofurov
Saif Sporting Club	Second				
Sheikh Russel KC	First	(Brazil) Ailton Machado (substituted off)	(Brazil) Thiago Amaral (substituted off)	(Guinea-Bissau) Esmaël Gonçalves (substituted off)	(Kyrgyzstan) Aizar Akmatov
Sheikh Russel KC	Second	(Ivory Coast) Didier Brossou (substituted on)	(Ghana) Richard Gadze (substituted on)	(Nigeria) Ismahil Akinade (substituted on)	
Swadhinata KS	First	(Bosnia and Herzegovina) Nedo Turković (substituted off)	(Poland) Rafał Zaborowski (substituted off)	(Iran) Siamak Kouroshi (substituted off)	(Uzbekistan) Nodir Mavlonov (substituted off)
Swadhinata KS	Second	(Brazil) Reinaldo Viana (substituted on)	(Brazil) Wallace Lima (substituted on)	(Serbia) Ivan Marić (substituted on)	(Japan) Yuta Suzuki (substituted on)
Uttar Baridhara Club	First	(Egypt) Mahmoud Sayed (substituted off)	(Egypt) Mostafa Kahraba	(Uzbekistan) Evgeniy Kochnev	(Uzbekistan) Saiddoston Fozilov
Uttar Baridhara Club	Second	(Ivory Coast) Youssouf Mory Bamba (substituted on)			

== League table ==
Pos	Team	Pld	W	D	L	GF	GA	GD	Pts	Qualification or relegation
1	Bashundhara Kings (C, Q)	22	18	3	1	53	21	+32	57	Qualification for 2023 AFC Champions League Play-off round or 2023 AFC Cup Group Stage
2	Dhaka Abahani (Q)	22	14	5	3	55	31	+24	47	Qualification for 2023 AFC Cup Play-off round
3	Saif Sporting Club	22	11	4	7	58	37	+21	37	
4	Sheikh Jamal DC	22	9	8	5	34	31	+3	35	
5	Dhaka Mohammedan	22	8	9	5	39	26	+13	33	
6	Sheikh Russel KC	22	8	7	7	35	31	+4	31	
7	Chittagong Abahani	22	8	7	7	39	42	−3	31	
8	Bangladesh Police FC	22	8	6	8	28	32	−4	30	
9	Muktijoddha Sangsad KC	22	5	4	13	27	42	−15	19	
10	Rahmatganj MFS	22	4	6	12	33	46	−13	18	
11	Uttar Baridhara Club (R)	22	3	5	14	24	58	−34	14	Relegation to Bangladesh Championship League
12	Swadhinata KS (R)	22	2	4	16	22	50	−28	10	Relegation to Bangladesh Championship League

Source: Soccerway
Rules for classification: 1) Points; 2) Goal difference; 3) Goals scored.
(C) Champions; (Q) Qualify for the AFC competition; (R) Relegated

== Results ==
Home \ Away	BPFC	BK	CAL	DAL	MSC	SJDC	MUK	RAH	SSC	SRKC	SKS	UB
Police	—	1–2	1–2	1–1	1–1	1–0	1–0	0–0	1–6	1–1	4–2	3–2
Kings	3–0	—	5–0	3–2	2–0	3–3	1–0	3–2	4–3	3–2	1–2	6–0
Ctg Abahani	3–2	0–1	—	2–3	1–1	0–2	2–1	2–1	3–4	1–2	3–2	4–2
Abahani	2–1	2–2	2–3	—	1–0	5–0	1–0	3–0	2–1	1–1	4–1	5–2
Mohammedan	0–0	1–1	3–3	2–4	—	3–1	2–1	7–0	1–3	1–1	3–2	3–0
Sheikh Jamal	0–0	1–2	2–1	0–0	1–1	—	2–1	1–0	2–2	1–0	2–2	2–1
Muktijoddha	1–4	2–3	1–1	3–4	2–1	0–3	—	0–1	3–3	0–0	2–1	1–2
Rahmatganj	1–2	0–2	0–0	1–2	1–5	3–3	7–1	—	1–3	3–2	1–1	3–1
Saif	1–0	0–2	3–3	4–2	0–2	2–2	2–3	4–2	—	0–1	1–2	3–0
Sheikh Russel	4–1	0–1	1–1	1–3	1–1	3–1	0–3	1–1	0–1	—	2–1	5–3
Swadhinata	0–1	0–2	1–2	1–1	0–1	1–3	0–1	1–5	1–5	1–4	—	0–2
Baridhara	0–2	0–1	2–2	2–5	0–0	0–2	1–1	1–1	0–7	3–2	0–0	—

Updated to match(es) played on 2 August 2022. Source: Soccerway
Legend: Blue = home team win; Yellow = draw; Red = away team win.

=== Positions by round ===
The following table lists the positions of teams after each week of matches. In order to preserve the chronological evolution, any postponed matches are not included to the round at which they were originally scheduled but added to the full round they were played immediately afterward.

Team ╲ Round	1	2	3	4	5	6	7	8	9	10	11	12	13	14	15	16	17	18	19	20	21	22
Police	11	9	9	10	8	7	5	4	4	5	6	7	7	7	7	7	7	5	6	6	6	8
Kings	8	6	4	2	2	1	1	1	1	1	1	1	1	1	1	1	1	1	1	1	1	1
Ctg Abahani	1	3	5	5	4	4	4	5	5	4	4	4	4	5	5	5	5	6	7	7	8	7
Abahani	4	4	2	1	1	2	2	2	2	3	2	2	2	2	2	2	2	2	2	2	2	2
Mohammedan	6	5	6	4	5	6	7	7	6	7	5	6	6	6	6	6	6	7	6	5	5	5
Sheikh Jamal	2	1	1	3	3	3	3	3	3	2	3	3	3	3	3	4	4	4	4	4	4	4
Muktijoddha	12	12	11	12	11	12	12	10	10	11	11	11	11	11	11	10	10	11	11	10	10	9
Rahmatganj	10	11	12	11	12	9	8	9	8	8	9	9	9	10	10	11	11	9	9	9	9	10
Saif	5	2	3	6	6	5	6	6	7	6	7	5	5	4	4	3	3	3	3	3	3	3
Sheikh Russel	7	8	7	7	7	8	10	11	11	10	8	8	8	8	8	8	8	8	8	8	7	6
Swadhinata	3	7	8	9	9	11	11	12	12	12	12	12	12	12	12	12	12	12	12	12	12	12
Baridhara	9	10	10	8	10	10	9	8	9	9	10	10	10	9	9	9	9	10	10	11	11	11

Leader
Runners-up
Relegation to BCL

Updated to match(es) played on 2 August 2022. Source: Soccerway

== Season statistics ==
=== Goalscorers ===
There have been 446 goals scored in 132 matches, for an average of 3.38 goals per match.

21 goals

- (Mali) Souleymane Diabate (Dhaka Mohammedan)

20 goals

- (Nigeria) Peter Ebimobowei (Chittagong Abahani)

18 goals

- (Brazil) Dorielton Gomes (Dhaka Abahani)

16 goals

- (Brazil) Robson Azevedo (Bashundhara Kings)

12 goals

- (Nigeria) Emeka Ogbugh (Saif Sporting Club)
- (Nigeria) Sunday Chizoba (Rahmatganj MFS)

11 goals

- (Nigeria) Mfon Udoh (Saif Sporting Club)

10 goals

- (Costa Rica) Daniel Colindres (Dhaka Abahani)

9 goals

- (Uzbekistan) Otabek Valijonov (Sheikh Jamal DC)
- (Afghanistan) Amredin Sharifi (Bangladesh Police FC)

8 goals

- (The Gambia) Solomon King Konform (Sheikh Jamal DC)
- (Uzbekistan) Asror Gofurov (Saif Sporting Club)
- (Brazil) Miguel Figueira (Bashundhara Kings)
- (Ghana) Philip Adjah (Rahmatganj MFS)

7 goals

- (Rwanda) Emery Bayisenge (Saif Sporting Club)
- (Nigeria) Matthew Chinedu (Sheikh Jamal DC)
- (Brazil) Raphael Augusto (Dhaka Abahani)

6 goals

- (Burundi) Sudi Abdallah (Muktijoddha Sangsad KC)
- (Nigeria) Ismahil Akinade (Sheikh Russel KC)
- (Kyrgyzstan) Aizar Akmatov (Sheikh Russel KC)
- (Bangladesh) Eleta Kingsley (Bashundhara Kings)

5 goals

- (Japan) Tetsuaki Misawa (Muktijoddha Sangsad KC)
- (Bangladesh) Nabib Newaj Jibon (Dhaka Abahani)
- (Bangladesh) Mohammad Jewel (Sheikh Russel KC)
- (Afghanistan) Omid Popalzay (Chittagong Abahani)
- (Bangladesh) Foysal Ahmed Fahim (Saif Sporting Club)
- (Bangladesh) Jewel Rana (Dhaka Abahani)
- (Japan) Soma Otani (Muktijoddha Sangsad KC)

4 goals

- (Uzbekistan) Evgeniy Kochnev (Uttar Baridhara Club)
- (Bangladesh) Shakhawat Hossain Rony (Chittagong Abahani)
- (Nigeria) Candy Augustine Agbane (Chittagong Abahani)
- (Nigeria) Ugochukwu Obi Moneke (Dhaka Mohammedan)
- (Bangladesh) Motin Mia (Bashundhara Kings)
- (Uzbekistan) Saiddoston Fozilov (Uttar Baridhara Club)
- (Bangladesh) Sazzad Hossain Shakil (Saif Sporting Club)
- (Bangladesh) Sumon Reza (Bashundhara Kings)
- (Bosnia and Herzegovina) Nedo Turković (Swadhinata KS)
- (Morocco) Adil Kouskous (Bangladesh Police FC)
- (Ivory Coast) Christian Kouakou

3 goals

- (Bangladesh) Sahed Hossain (Dhaka Mohammedan)
- (Ghana) Richard Gadze (Sheikh Russel KC)
- (Ivory Coast) Didier Brossou (Sheikh Russel KC)
- (Bangladesh) Obidur Rahman Nawbab (Muktijoddha Sangsad KC)
- (Bangladesh) Dipok Roy (Sheikh Russel KC)
- (Bangladesh) Maraz Hossain (Saif Sporting Club)
- (Bangladesh) Rakib Hossain (Dhaka Abahani)
- (The Gambia) Nuha Marong (Bashundhara Kings)
- (Bangladesh) Mannaf Rabby (Sheikh Russel KC)
- (Iran) Khaled Shafiei (Bashundhara Kings)
- M S Bablu (Bangladesh Police FC)
- (Bangladesh) Jafar Iqbal (Dhaka Mohammedan)
- (Bangladesh) Riyadul Hasan Rafi (Saif Sporting Club)
- (Bangladesh) Sujon Biswas (Uttar Baridhara Club)
- (Bangladesh) Aminur Rahman Sajib (Muktijoddha Sangsad KC)
- (Brazil) Danilo Quipapá (Bangladesh Police FC)
- (The Gambia) Sulayman Sillah (Sheikh Jamal DC)
- (Nigeria) Musa Tachi Najare (Sheikh Jamal DC)
- (Ivory Coast) Youssouf Mory Bamba (Uttar Baridhara Club)
- (Bangladesh) Arif Hossain (Uttar Baridhara Club)
- (Bangladesh) Zillur Rahman (Swadhinata KS)

2 goals

- (Bangladesh) Khondoker Ashraful Islam (Rahmatganj MFS)
- (Bangladesh) Shekh Morsalin (Dhaka Mohammedan)
- (Bangladesh) Bishal Das (Swadhinata KS)
- (Bangladesh) Enamul Islam Gazi (Rahmatganj MFS)
- (Bangladesh) Mehedi Hasan Royal (Dhaka Abahani)
- Mohammad Al Amin (Bangladesh Police FC)
- (Bangladesh) Mohammed Ibrahim (Bashundhara Kings)
- (Bangladesh) Rasel Ahmed (Swadhinata KS)
- (Bangladesh) Shahriar Emon (Dhaka Mohammedan)
- (Bangladesh) Tawhidul Alam Sabuz (Bashundhara Kings)
- (Bosnia and Herzegovina) Stojan Vranješ (Bashundhara Kings)
- (Egypt) Mostafa Kahraba (Uttar Baridhara Club)
- (Guinea-Bissau) Esmaël Gonçalves (Sheikh Russel KC)
- (Uzbekistan) Nodir Mavlonov (Swadhinata KS)
- (Bangladesh) Maruf Ahamed (Uttar Baridhara Club)
- (Ivory Coast) Lancine Touré (Rahmatganj MFS)
- (Bangladesh) Emon Mahmud Babu (Dhaka Abahani)
- (Bangladesh) Ekbal Hussain (Swadhinata KS)
- (Nigeria) Chijoke Alaekwe (Sheikh Jamal DC)
- (Tajikistan) Siyovush Asrorov (Rahmatganj MFS)
- (Bangladesh) Manik Hossain Molla (Sheikh Russel KC)
- (Bangladesh) Rahim Uddin (Saif Sporting Club)
- (Bangladesh) Sohanur Rahman (Sheikh Jamal DC)
- (Bangladesh) Saif Shamsud (Dhaka Mohammedan)/(Swadhinata KS)
- (Croatia) Ivan Marić (Swadhinata KS)
- (Bangladesh) Didarul Alam (Muktijoddha Sangsad KC)

1 goal

- (Japan) Yuta Suzuki (Swadhinata KS)
- (Bangladesh) Mohamed Al-Amin (Rahmatganj MFS)
- (Bangladesh) Nasiruddin Chowdhury (Sheikh Russel KC)
- (Bangladesh) Samim Yasir Juel (Uttar Baridhara Club)
- (Bangladesh) Asadul Islam Sakib (Uttar Baridhara Club)
- (Bangladesh) Sabuz Hossain (Saif Sporting Club)
- (Australia) Aaron Reardon (Dhaka Mohammedan)
- Faisal Ahmed Shitol (Bangladesh Police FC)
- (Bangladesh) Forhad Mona (Dhaka Mohammedan)
- (Bangladesh) Hemanta Vincent Biswas (Sheikh Russel KC)
- (Bangladesh) Jahidul Alam (Swadhinata KS)
- (Bangladesh) Fazlay Rabbi (Rahmatganj MFS)
- (Bangladesh) Kamrul Islam (Chittagong Abahani)
- (Bangladesh) Mezbah Uddin (Rahmatganj MFS)
- (Bangladesh) Abid Ahmed (Saif Sporting Club)
- (Bangladesh) Ashraful Haque Asif (Dhaka Mohammedan)
- (Bangladesh) Mohamed Atikuzzaman (Sheikh Jamal DC)
- (Bangladesh) Mohamed Sohel Rana (Chittagong Abahani)
- (Bangladesh) Papon Singh (Uttar Baridhara Club)
- (Bangladesh) Sanowar Hossain Lal (Rahmatganj MFS)
- (Bangladesh) Rubel Miya (Chittagong Abahani)
- (Bangladesh) Sabbir Hossen (Swadhinata KS)
- (Bangladesh) Sohel Rana (Bashundhara Kings)
- (Bangladesh) Sohel Rana (Dhaka Abahani)
- (Bangladesh) Yeasin Arafat (Bashundhara Kings)
- (Bangladesh) Nurul Naium Faisal (Dhaka Abahani)
- (Bangladesh) Tariqul Islam (Muktijoddha Sangsad KC)
- (Brazil) Denilson Rodrigues Roldão (Bangladesh Police FC)
- (Ivory Coast) Djedje Maximin Djawa (Bangladesh Police FC)
- (Nigeria) Kehinde Yisa Anifowoshe (Chittagong Abahani)
- (Bangladesh) Arifur Rahman (Chittagong Abahani)
- (Guinea) Aboubacar Camara (Muktijoddha Sangsad KC)
- (Iran) Milad Sheykh Soleimani (Dhaka Abahani)
- (Nigeria) Kehinde Yisa Anifowoshe (Chittagong Abahani)
- (Poland) Rafał Zaborowski (Swadhinata KS)
- (South Africa) William Twala (Chittagong Abahani)
- (Bangladesh) Biplu Ahmed (Bashundhara Kings)

=== Own goals ===
† Bold Club indicates winner of the match

Player	Club	Opponent	Result	Date
(Bangladesh) Hasan Murad	Swadhinata KS	Muktijoddha Sangsad KC	1–2	25 February 2022
(Guinea) Younoussa Camara	Muktijoddha Sangsad KC	Rahmatganj MFS	0–1	7 March 2022
(Bangladesh) Khokon Miah	Uttar Baridhara Club	Bashundhara Kings	0–6	29 April 2022

=== Hat-tricks ===
Player	For	Against	Result	Date	Ref
(Brazil) Dorielton	Dhaka Abahani	Rahmatganj MFS	3–0	13 February 2022	
(Nigeria) Peter Ebimobowei	Chittagong Abahani	Saif Sporting Club	3–3	24 February 2022	
(Nigeria) Emeka Ogbugh	Saif Sporting Club	Swadhinata KS	5–1	1 March 2022	
(Afghanistan) Amredin Sharifi	Bangladesh Police FC	Swadhinata KS	4–2	7 March 2022	
(Nigeria) Peter Ebimobowei	Chittagong Abahani	Uttar Baridhara Club	4–2	17 March 2022	
(Nigeria) Matthew Chinedu	Sheikh Jamal DC	Swadhinata KS	3–1	3 April 2022	
(Mali) Souleymane Diabate	Dhaka Mohammedan	Chittagong Abahani	3–3	8 May 2022	

=== Clean Sheets ===
Rank	Player	Club	Clean sheets
1	(Bangladesh) Anisur Rahman Zico	Bashundhara Kings	11
2	(Bangladesh) Mohammad Nehal	Bangladesh Police FC	7
3	(Bangladesh) Shahidul Alam Sohel	Dhaka Abahani	5
4	(Bangladesh) Sujon Hossain	Mohammedan Sporting Club	4
4	(Bangladesh) Mohammad Nayem	Sheikh Jamal DC	4

=== Discipline ===
==== Player ====
- Most yellow cards: 7
  - Ayzar Akmatov (Sheikh Russel KC)
  - Sajon Mia (Muktijoddha Sangsad KC)
  - Shakil Hossain (Swadhinata KS)
  - Tareq Miah (Muktijoddha Sangsad KC)
- Most red cards: 2
  - Masud Rana (Mohammedan SC)
  - Otabek Valijonov (Sheikh Jamal DC)

==== Club ====
- Yellow cards:

Rank	Club	Yellow cards
1	Bashundhara Kings	45
1	Muktijoddha Sangsad KC	47
3	Uttar Baridhara Club	43
4	Abahani Limited Dhaka	42
5	Bangladesh Police FC	40
6	Sheikh Russel KC	38
7	Mohammedan Sporting Club	36
8	Saif Sporting Club	33
9	Swadhinata KS	28
10	Chittagong Abahani	28
11	Sheikh Jamal DC	27
12	Rahmatganj MFS	26

- Red cards:

Rank	Club	Red cards
1	Mohammedan Sporting Club	5
2	Bashundhara Kings	3
2	Chittagong Abahani	3
2	Rahmatganj MFS	3
2	Uttar Baridhara Club	3
2	Sheikh Russel KC	3
2	Saif SC	3
8	Sheikh Jamal DC	2
8	Abahani Limited Dhaka	2
8	Muktijoddha Sangsad KC	2
8	Police FC	2
12	Swadhinata KS	1

== See also ==
- 2021–22 Bangladesh Championship League
- 2021–22 Federation Cup
- 2021–22 Independence Cup
- 2021–22 BFF U-18 Football League
- 2021-22 BFF U-16 Football Tournament
