= Rabiul Hasan =

Bangladeshi footballer

Personal information
- Full name: Mohammed Rabiul Hasan
- Date of birth: 26 June 1999 (age 27)
- Place of birth: Tangail, Bangladesh
- Height: 1.71 m (5 ft 7 1/2 in)
- Position: Attacking midfielder

Team information
- Current team: Brothers Union
- Number: 8

Youth career
- 2010–2011: Somaj Kallyan KSM

Senior career*
Years	Team	Apps	(Gls)
2015–2016	Dilkusha SC	?	(?)
2016–2019	Arambagh KS	?	(3)
2019–2021	Bashundhara Kings	1	(0)
2021	Mohammedan SC	3	(0)
2021–2022	Chittagong Abahani	8	(0)
2022–2023	Bangladesh Police	16	(4)
2023–2025	Dhaka Abahani	20	(0)
2025–	Brothers Union	0	(0)

International career^{‡}
2013	Bangladesh U16	?	(0)
2018–2023	Bangladesh U23	11	(0)
2018–	Bangladesh	23	(3)
- * Club domestic league appearances and goals as of 23 February 2024 ‡ National team caps and goals as of 21 March 2024

Mohammed Rabiul Hasan (Bengali: মোহাম্মাদ রবিউল হাসান), also spelled as Robiul Hasan, is a Bangladeshi footballer who plays as a midfielder. He currently plays for Brothers Union in Bangladesh Football League and the Bangladesh national team.

== Club career ==
=== Mohammedan SC ===
In April 2021, Rabiul joined Mohammedan SC. On 1 May 2021, he made his debut against Arambagh KS. The following month Rabiul was absent from the squad and in July 2021, Mohammedan announced that they had expelled Rabiul indefinitely for disciplinary issues. Although Rabiul was still a Mohammedan player on paper, there was no communication between him and the club.

== International career ==
On 29 August 2018, Rabiul made his senior career debut in a 0–1 loss against Sri Lanka in an international friendly.

== Career statistics ==
=== Club ===
As of 23 February 2024.

Appearances and goals by club, season and competition
Club	Season	League			Domestic Cup (Note: Appearance(s) in Bangladesh Federation Cup)		Other (Note: Appearance(s) in Bangladesh Independence Cup)		Continental		Total	
Club	Season	Division	Apps	Goals	Apps	Goals	Apps	Goals	Apps	Goals	Apps	Goals
Arambagh KS	2015–16	Bangladesh Football League	?	0	0	0	0	0	—		?	0
Arambagh KS	2017–18	Bangladesh Football League	19	1	2	1	5	0	—		26	2
Arambagh KS	2018–19	Bangladesh Football League	16	2	3	0	3	3	—		22	5
Arambagh KS	Arambagh KS		35	3	5	1	8	3	0	0	48	7
Bashundhara Kings	2019–20	Bangladesh Football League	1	0	1	0	—		1 (Note: Appearance(s) in AFC Cup)	0	3	0
Mohammedan SC	2020–21	Bangladesh Football League	3	0	0	0	—		—		3	0
Chittagong Abahani	2021–22	Bangladesh Football League	9	0	0	0	0	0	—		9	0
Bangladesh Police	2021–22	Bangladesh Football League	16	4	0	0	4	0	—		20	4
Dhaka Abahani	2023–24	Bangladesh Football League	6	0	3	0	5	1	—		14	1
Career total			70	7	9	1	17	4	1	0	97	12

=== International ===
As of 21 March 2024.

Bangladesh national team
Year	Apps	Goals
2018	4	0
2019	8	3
2020	1	0
2023	9	0
2024	1	0
Total	23	3

=== International goals ===
Scores and results list Bangladesh U23's goal tally first.

No.	Date	Venue	Opponent	Score	Result	Competition
–	6 August 2018	Mokpo International Football Center, Mokpo, South Korea	(South Korea) Chodang University FC	3–1	3–1	Unofficial Friendly

Scores and results list Bangladesh's goal tally first.

No.	Date	Venue	Opponent	Score	Result	Competition
1.	9 March 2019	Olympic Stadium, Phnom Penh, Cambodia	Cambodia	1–0	1–0	Friendly
2.	6 June 2019	New Laos National Stadium, Vientiane, Laos	Laos	1–0	1–0	2022 FIFA World Cup qualification
–	5 September 2019	Pamir Stadium, Dushanbe, Tajikistan	(Tajikistan) CSKA Pamir Dushanbe	1–0	1–1	Unofficial Friendly
3.	29 September 2019	Bangabandhu National Stadium, Dhaka, Bangladesh	Bhutan	4–1	4–1	Friendly

== Honours ==
Dilkusha SC

- Dhaka Third Division League: 2015

Arambagh KS

- Independence Cup: 2017–18

Bashundhara Kings

- Federation Cup: 2019–20
