= Shahid Muktijoddha Smriti Stadium =

Football Stadium in Bangladesh

Coordinates: 25°00′28.48″N 90°01′05.19″E

- Interactive map of Shahid Muktijoddha Smriti Stadium
- Location: Sherpur, Bangladesh
- Owner: National Sports Council
- Operator: National Sports Council
- Surface: Grass

Tenants
- Sherpur Cricket Team; Sherpur Football Team

Shahid Muktijoddha Smriti Stadium is located by the Sherpur City Park, Sherpur, Bangladesh.

== See also ==
- Stadiums in Bangladesh
- List of cricket grounds in Bangladesh
