= Shaheed Ahsan Ullah Master Stadium =

Stadium of Bangladesh popular for archery

- Interactive map of Shaheed Ahsan Ullah Master Stadium
- Address: Tongi; Bangladesh
- Coordinates: 23°53′20.6″N 90°24′2.3″E
- Owner: National Sports Council
- Operator: National Sports Council
- Capacity: 5,000
- Surface: Grass

Tenants
- Swadhinata KS; Uttar Baridhara Club

Shaheed Ahsan Ullah Master Stadium is a multi-purpose stadium in Tongi, Gazipur.

== Archery ==
Shaheed Ahsan Ullah Master Stadium served as the venue for the ISSF International Solidarity World Ranking Archery Championship. The stadium also hosted Bangladesh Archery Cup & 11th National Archery Championship in 2019.

== Football ==
Uttar Baridhara Club using this stadium as their new home venue for 2021 Bangladesh Premier League. And Swadhinata KS using as a their home venue since 2021–22 season.

== See also ==
- Stadiums in Bangladesh
- List of football stadiums in Bangladesh
