= Dori (footballer) =

Brazilian footballer (born 1990)

Personal information
- Full name: Dorielton Gomes Nascimento
- Date of birth: 7 March 1990 (age 36)
- Place of birth: Duque de Caxias, Rio de Janeiro, Brazil
- Height: 1.85 m (6 ft 1 in)
- Position: Forward

Team information
- Current team: New Radiant

Youth career
- Fluminense

Senior career*
| Years | Team | Apps | (Gls) |
| 2008–2016 | Fluminense | 2 | (0) |
| 2010 | → Brasiliense (loan) | 1 | (0) |
| 2011 | → Changchun Yatai (loan) | 28 | (5) |
| 2012 | → Náutico (loan) | 14 | (2) |
| 2012–2013 | → Shaanxi Wuzhou (loan) | 35 | (21) |
| 2014 | → Shaoxing Keqiao Yuejia (loan) | 26 | (11) |
| 2015–2016 | → Inner Mongolia Zhongyou (loan) | 56 | (20) |
| 2017–2018 | Inner Mongolia Zhongyou | 56 | (20) |
| 2019–2021 | Meizhou Hakka | 32 | (9) |
| 2020–2021 | → Shenzhen Peng City (loan) | 5 | (2) |
| 2021–2022 | Dhaka Abahani | 16 | (18) |
| 2022–2024 | Bashundhara Kings | 33 | (34) |
| 2024 | Forca Kochi | 10 | (8) |
| 2025 | Odisha | 10 | (3) |
| 2025–2026 | Bashundhara Kings | 16 | (19) |
| 2026– | New Radiant | | |
- * Club domestic league appearances and goals as of 26 May 2026

Dorielton Gomes Nascimento (born 7 March 1990), simply known as Dori, is a Brazilian professional footballer who plays as a forward for New Radiant.

== Club career ==
=== Bashundhara Kings ===
Dorielton joined the Bangladeshi club Bashundhara Kings, where his performance helped the club clinched the title.

=== Forca Kochi ===
In 2024, he joined Forca Kochi in the inaugural edition of Super League Kerala, where he finished the season as the top scorer with 8 goals in 11 matches, including in the final.

=== Odisha ===
In 2024, Dori joined Indian Super League side Odisha.

=== Bashundhara Kings ===
In 2025, he rejoined Bashundhara Kings, where his performance in the following 2025–26 Bangladesh Football League season contributed to the club's clinching the title.

=== New Radiant ===
He signed with New Radiant in 2026.

== Career statistics ==
As of 11 December 2024.

| Sex Club | Season | League | | | National Cup | | Continental | | Other | | Total | |
| Sex Club | Season | Division | Apps | Goals | Apps | Goals | Apps | Goals | Apps | Goals | Apps | Goals |
|---|---|---|---|---|---|---|---|---|---|---|---|---|
| Fluminense | 2008 | Série A | 1 | 0 | - | | 0 | 0 | 0 (Note: Appearances in Campeonato Carioca) | 0 | 0 | 0 |
| Fluminense | 2009 | Série A | 0 | 0 | - | | 0 | 0 | 0 | 0 | 0 | 0 |
| Fluminense | 2010 | Série A | 0 | 0 | - | | - | | 1 | 0 | 1 | 0 |
| Fluminense | Total | | 1 | 0 | 0 | 0 | 0 | 0 | 1 | 0 | 2 | 0 |
| Brasiliense (loan) | 2010 | Série B | 1 | 0 | 1 | 0 | - | | 0 (Note: Appearances in Campeonato Brasiliense) | 0 | 2 | 0 |
| Changchun Yatai (loan) | 2011 | Chinese Super League | 28 | 5 | 1 | 0 | - | | - | | 29 | 5 |
| Náutico (loan) | 2012 | Série A | 0 | 0 | 3 | 0 | - | | 14 (Note: Appearances in Campeonato Pernambucano) | 2 | 17 | 2 |
| Guangdong Sunray Cave (loan) | 2012 | China League One | 11 | 5 | 1 | 0 | - | | - | | 12 | 5 |
| Guangdong Sunray Cave (loan) | 2013 | China League One | 24 | 16 | 2 | 1 | - | | - | | 26 | 17 |
| Guangdong Sunray Cave (loan) | Total | | 35 | 21 | 3 | 1 | 0 | 0 | 0 | 0 | 38 | 22 |
| Harbin Yiteng (loan) | 2014 | Chinese Super League | 26 | 10 | 0 | 0 | - | | - | | 26 | 10 |
| Nei Mongol Zhongyou (loan) | 2015 | China League One | 27 | 10 | 1 | 0 | - | | - | | 28 | 10 |
| Nei Mongol Zhongyou (loan) | 2016 | China League One | 29 | 12 | 1 | 0 | - | | - | | 30 | 10 |
| Nei Mongol Zhongyou (loan) | Total | | 56 | 22 | 2 | 0 | 0 | 0 | 0 | 0 | 58 | 22 |
| Nei Mongol Zhongyou | 2017 | China League One | 29 | 13 | 1 | 0 | - | | - | | 30 | 13 |
| Nei Mongol Zhongyou | 2018 | China League One | 27 | 7 | 0 | 0 | - | | - | | 27 | 7 |
| Nei Mongol Zhongyou | Total | | 56 | 20 | 1 | 0 | 0 | 0 | 0 | 0 | 57 | 20 |
| Meizhou Hakka | 2019 | China League One | 27 | 9 | 0 | 0 | - | | - | | 27 | 9 |
| Meizhou Hakka | 2020 | China League One | 5 | 0 | 0 | 0 | - | | - | | 5 | 0 |
| Meizhou Hakka | Total | | 32 | 9 | 0 | 0 | 0 | 0 | 0 | 0 | 32 | 9 |
| Sichuan Jiuniu (loan) | 2020 | China League One | 5 | 2 | 0 | 0 | - | | - | | 5 | 2 |
| Abahani Dhaka | 2021–22 | Bangladesh Premier League | 16 | 18 | 8 | 8 | - | | - | | 24 | 26 |
| Bashundhara Kings | 2022–23 | Bangladesh Premier League | 19 | 20 | 8 | 13 | | | | | 27 | 33 |
| Forca Kochi | 2024 | Super League Kerala | 10 | 8 | | | | | | | 10 | 8 |
| Career total | | | 295 | 115 | 11 | 0 | 0 | 0 | 15 | 2 | 321 | 117 |

== Honours ==
Fluminense

- Copa Libertadores runner-up: 2008

Dhaka Abahani

- Bangladesh Premier League runner-up: 2021–22
- Federation Cup: 2021–22
- Independence Cup: 2021–22

Bashundhara Kings

- Bangladesh Premier League: 2022–23, 2023–24
- Independence Cup: 2022–23, 2023–24
- Federation Cup third place: 2022–23

Individual

- Super League Kerala Golden Boot: 2024
