= Ayzar Akmatov =

Kyrgyz footballer

Personal information
- Full name: Ayzar Talantbekovich Akmatov
- Date of birth: 24 August 1998 (age 28)
- Place of birth: Bishkek, Kyrgyzstan
- Height: 1.80 m (5 ft 11 in)
- Position: Defender

Team information
- Current team: FC Bars Issyk-Kul
- Number: 34

Senior career*
Years	Team	Apps	(Gls)
2017–2019	Dordoi Bishkek		
2017–2018	→ Alga Bishkek (loan)		
2020	Alga Bishkek	13	(0)
2021	Dordoi Bishkek	12	(0)
2021–2022	Sheikh Russel	13	(6)
2022–2024	Abdysh-Ata Kant		

International career^{‡}
2018	Kyrgyzstan U21	3	(0)
2018–	Kyrgyzstan	25	(3)
- * Club domestic league appearances and goals ‡ National team caps and goals as of 14 November 2026

Ayzar Talantbekovich Akmatov (Kyrgyz: Айзар Акматов; Russian: Айзар Талантбекович Акматов; born August 24, 1998) is a Kyrgyz professional footballer who plays for FC Bars Issyk-Kul in the Kyrgyz Premier League and the Kyrgyzstan national football team as a defender.

== Career ==
=== Club ===
Akmatov spent the 2017 & 2018 seasons on loan at Alga Bishkek, returning to Dordoi Bishkek prior to the start of the 2019 season.

After spending the 2020 season with Alga Bishkek, Akmatov returned to Dordoi Bishkek for the 2021 season.

In 2021, He signed for Bangladesh Premier League side Sheikh Russel on Asian quota.

=== International ===
Akmatov made his debut for Kyrgyzstan national football team in a friendly match on September 10, 2018, against Syria. He was included in Kyrgyzstan's squad for the 2018 Asian Games in Indonesia, and the 2019 AFC Asian Cup in the United Arab Emirates.

== Career statistics ==
=== International ===
Appearances and goals by national team and year
National team	Year	Apps	Goals
Kyrgyzstan	2018	4	0
Kyrgyzstan	2021	7	1
Kyrgyzstan	2022	3	0
Kyrgyzstan	2023	7	0
Kyrgyzstan	2024	3	0
Kyrgyzstan	2026	1	1
Total		25	4

Scores and results list Kyrgyzstan's goal tally first, score column indicates score after each Akmatov goal.

List of international goals scored by Ayzar Akmatov
No.	Date	Venue	Opponent	Score	Result	Competition
1	11 November 2021	Al Hamriya Sports Club Stadium, Sharjah, United Arab Emirates	Singapore	1–0	2–1	Friendly
2	5 January 2024	Maktoum bin Rashid Al Maktoum Stadium, Dubai, United Arab Emirates	Malaysia	1–0	1–1	Friendly
3	14 November 2026	Thiên Trường Stadium, Ninh Bình, Vietnam	Chinese Taipei	3–0	3–0	2026 Casper Cup
