= William Twala =

South African soccer player

Personal information
- Date of birth: 21 February 1990 (age 36)
- Place of birth: Soweto, South Africa
- Height: 1.69 m (5 ft 6 1/2 in)
- Position: Right winger

Youth career
- Wits University
- Orlando Pirates

Senior career*
Years	Team	Apps	(Gls)
2011–2014	Orlando Pirates	5	(0)
2011–2012	→ FC AK (loan)	?	(?)
2012–2013	→ Chippa United (loan)	21	(1)
2014	→ Golden Arrows (loan)	6	(0)
2014–2016	Chippa United	40	(3)
2016–2018	Kaizer Chiefs	43	(3)
2018	→ Maritzburg United (loan)	4	(0)
2018–2019	Free State Stars	1	(0)
2019–2020	Chippa United	26	(4)
2020–2021	Erbil SC	3	(1)
2021	Madan Maharaj	2	(0)
2021–2022	Chittagong Abahani	9	(1)

International career
2015–	South Africa	3	(0)
- * Club domestic league appearances and goals

William Twala (born 21 February 1990) is a South African footballer who plays as a winger.

== Club career ==
Twala began his professional career with Orlando Pirates FC in 2011, and has since played for Lamontville Golden Arrows, Kaizer Chiefs, Maritzburg United, and Free State Stars, as well as three stints with Chippa United.

He has scored 11 goals and 16 assists in 158 games for Pirates, Chippa United, Golden Arrows, Chiefs, Maritzburg United, Free State Stars, Erbil SC, and most recently Callies in all competitions according to FourFourTwo. While Twala played for Pretoria Callies, he was hoping that the side could gain promotion to the DStv Premiership.

In September 2021, Twala moved to India and signed with newly formed club Madan Maharaj FC, that competes in the I-League 2nd Division.
