= Candy Agbane =

Nigerian footballer (born 1996)

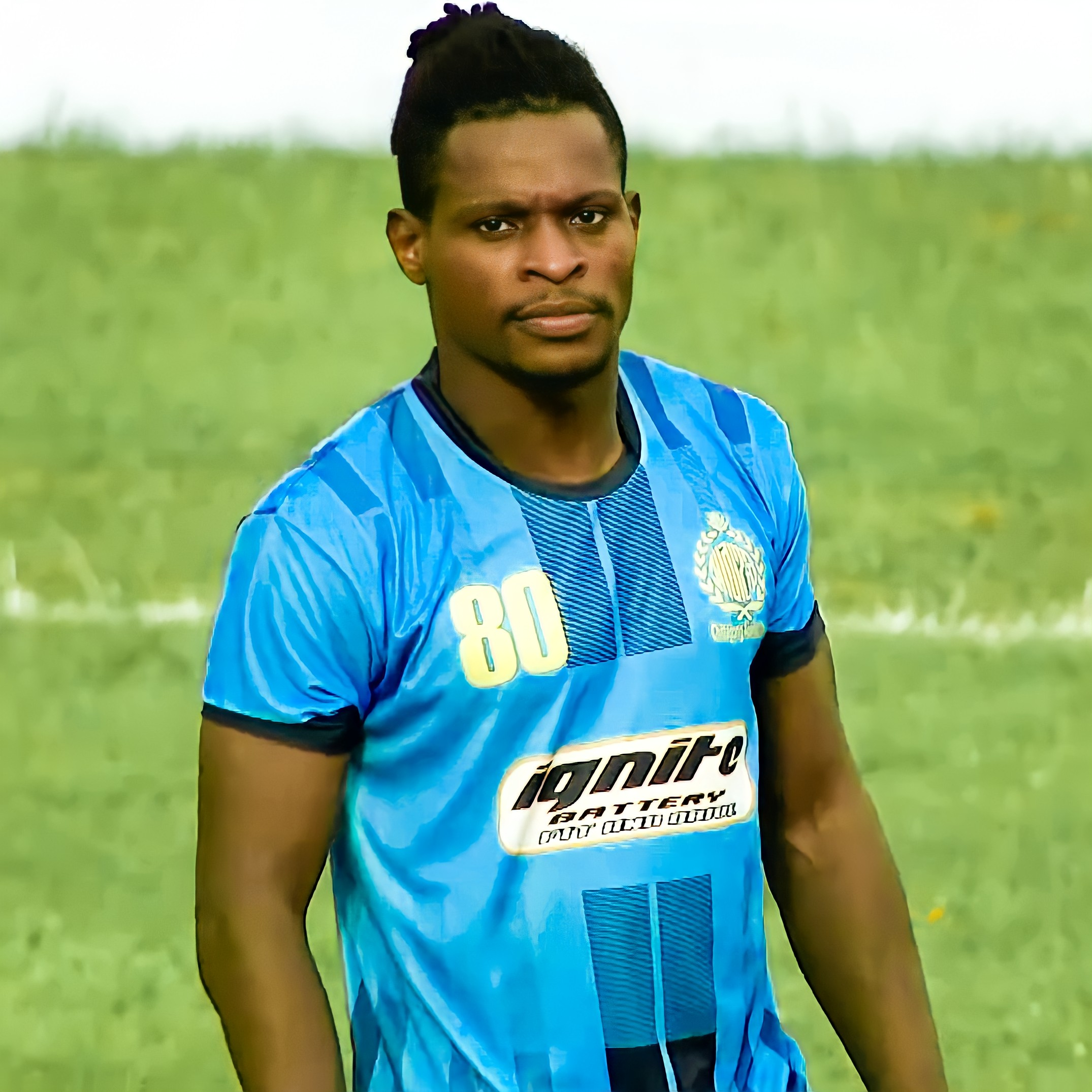
- Candy with Chittagong Abahani in 2022

Personal information
- Full name: Candy Augustine Agbane
- Date of birth: 22 December 1996 (age 29)
- Place of birth: Lagos, Nigeria
- Height: 1.70 m (5 ft 7 in)
- Position: Forward

Senior career*
Years	Team	Apps	(Gls)
2015–2016	Ikorodu United	27	(7)
2017–2019	Yenicami Ağdelen	7	(2)
2017	→ Lefke TSK (loan)	16	(6)
2017–2018	Lefke TSK	26	(8)
2018–2019	Stropkov	9	(3)
2019–2020	Lefke TSK	8	(3)
2019–	Türk Ocağı Limasol	15	(8)
2020–2021	Lefke TSK		
2022	Mesarya SK		
2022–2023	Chittagong Abahani	21	(4)
- * Club domestic league appearances and goals as of 22 July 2023

Candy Augustine Agbane (born 22 December 1996) is a Nigerian professional footballer who last played as a winger for Bangladesh Premier League club Chittagong Abahani.

== Club career ==
=== Early career ===
He began his career in the Ikorodu United F.C. in Nigeria Premier League. In August 2016, Agbane joined Süper Lig club Yenicami Ağdelen on a two-year deal.

=== Lefke TSK and MŠK Tesla Stropkov ===
He joined Lefke TSK in September 2017. After a successful loan spell, he joined the Northern Cyprus club on a permanent deal.

On 3 March 2019, Agbane signed for Slovak 3. Liga side Stropkov at the start of the 2019–2020. After a season in Slovakia, he returned to Lefke TSK in January 2020.

=== Chittagong Abahani ===
After a very short spell at Mesarya SK, Candy signed for Bangladesh Premier League club Chittagong Abahani as mid-season signing in April, 2022. It was his first ever club from Asia. He scored 4 goals and provided 4 assists in 10 appearances for the club in first season. He scored once and assisted once in the last match of the season. In August 2022, Candy signed a contract extension with Ctg Abahani for 2022–23 season. However, he was goalless in the following season and left the club after picking up a season-long injury in the mid-season.
