= Peter Ebimobowei =

Nigerian footballer

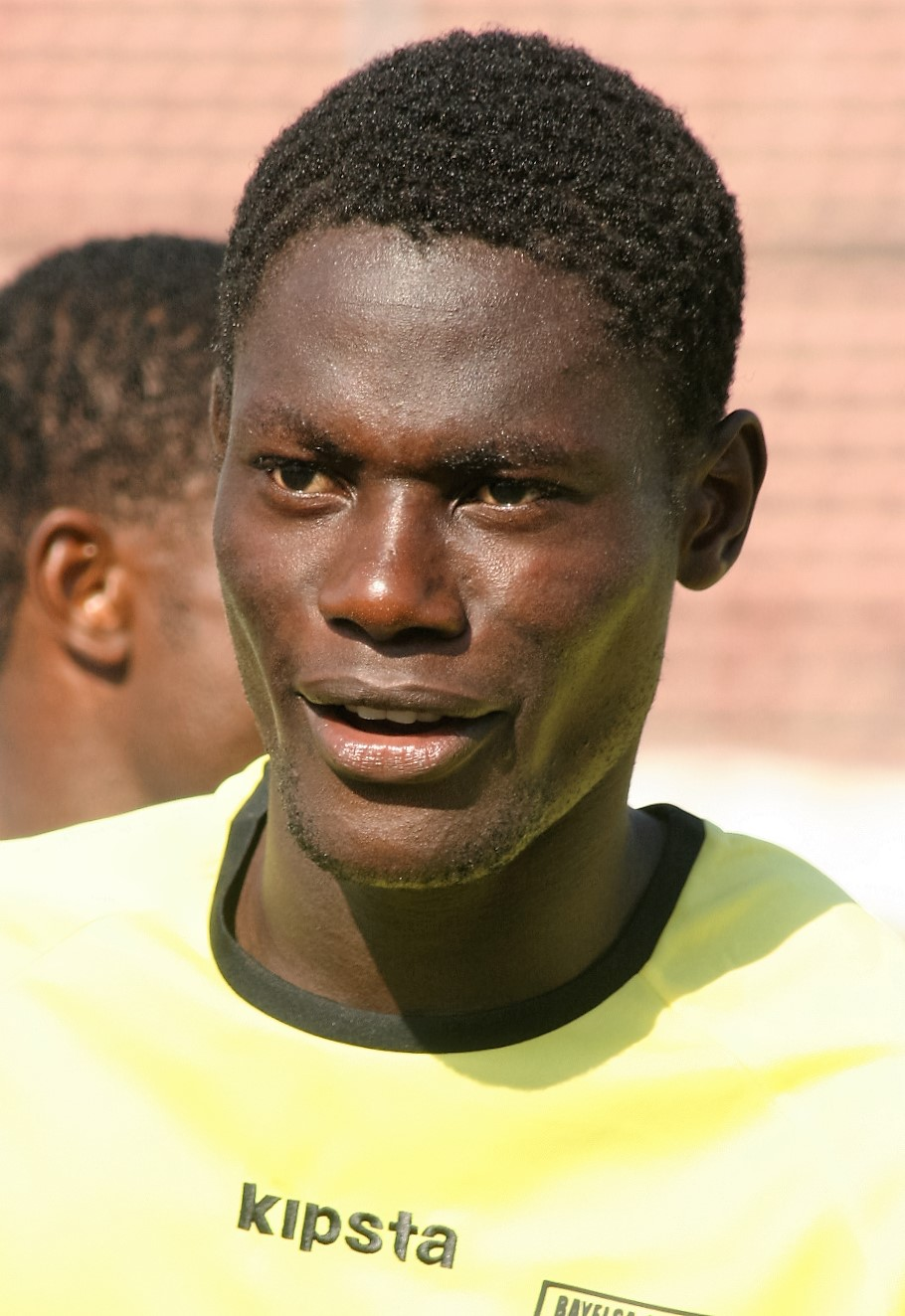

Personal information
- Full name: Peter Thankgod Ebimobowei
- Date of birth: November 11, 1993 (age 32)
- Place of birth: Bayelsa, Nigeria
- Height: 1.84 m (6 ft 0 in)
- Positions: Forward; second striker

Team information
- Current team: Gençlik Gücü T.S.K.

Youth career
- 2005–2013: Bayelsa United

Senior career*
Years	Team	Apps	(Gls)
2013–2014	Bayelsa United	50	(33)
2015	Al Ahly	5	(3)
2015–2016	El-Entag		
2016–2017	Mesaimeer		
2017–2018	Binatlı		
2018–2019	Mağusa Türk Gücü		(27)
2019–2021	Al-Minaa	0	(0)
2021–2022	Chittagong Abahani	21	(20)
2023	Rahmatganj MFS	9	(4)
2023–	Gençlik Gücü T.S.K.		
- * Club domestic league appearances and goals as of 27 September 2023

Peter Ebimobowei, commonly known as Ebi (born November 11, 1993), is a Nigerian footballer, who plays as a striker for Gençlik Gücü T.S.K.

Peter joined Al-Ahly in January 2015 coming from Bayelsa United in Nigeria.

== Honours ==
=== Club ===
Mağusa Türk Gücü

- KTFF Süper Lig: 2018–19
