= Kehinde Yisa Anifowoshe =

Nigerian footballer

Personal information
- Full name: Kehinde Yisa Anifowoshe
- Date of birth: 11 October 1992 (age 34)
- Place of birth: Lagos, Nigeria
- Height: 1.90 m (6 ft 3 in)
- Positions: Centre back; defensive midfielder

Senior career*
Years	Team	Apps	(Gls)
2015–2016	MFM F.C.	15	(2)
2017–2018	1º de Agosto	23	(4)
2019–2020	Lobi Stars	4	(0)
2021	Bahrain SC	8	(1)
2021–2022	Chittagong Abahani	21	(1)
- * Club domestic league appearances and goals as of 26 October 2022 (UTC)

Kehinde Yisa Anifowoshe (born 11 October 1992) is a Nigerian professional footballer who last played as a centre back as well as operating as a defensive midfielder for Bangladesh Premier League club Chittagong Abahani.

== Club career ==
=== MFM FC ===
Anifowoshe signed for Nigeria Professional Football League side MFM F.C. in January 2016.

=== 1º de Agosto ===
He then signed with Angola Angolan League side 1º de Agosto in January 2018.

=== Lobi Stars ===
Kehinde returned to Nigeria and sign with Nigeria Professional Football League club, Lobi Stars, for 2 years.

=== Bahrain SC ===
On 5 February 2021 he joined Bahraini football club Bahrain SC.

== Honours ==
1º de Agosto

- Angolan League: 2018, 2019
