= Uttar Baridhara Club =

Association football club based in Dhaka

- Nickname: Baridhara
- Founded: 1995; 31 years ago
- Ground: BSSS Mostafa Kamal Stadium
- Capacity: 25,000
- President: Sharif Uddin
- Head Coach: Md Jashim Mehedi
- League: Dhaka Senior Division League
- 2024–25: Bangladesh Championship League, 9th of 10 (relegated)

Uttar Baridhara Club (Bengali: উত্তর বারিধারা ক্লাব, Bengali pronunciation: [uttor baɾidʱaɾa klab]), commonly known as Uttar Baridhara, is a Bangladeshi football club, established in 1995, based in Kalachandpur, Baridhara, Dhaka. They currently compete in the Dhaka Senior Division League, the third tier of Bangladeshi football, following relegation from the 2021–22 Bangladesh Premier League and then punishment for match fixing.

== History ==
=== Journey to the top flight (1995–2013) ===
The Baridhara-based team started its journey in 1995 with the help of some enthusiastic locals. Jahangir Alam was named the clubs general secretary. The club were promoted to the second division, now known as the Bangladesh Championship League, in the 2007 season after clinching the third division title. They were unlucky not to be promoted to the top-tier in their first season in the Championship league, where they finished league runners-up.

After six years fighting for promotion, Baridhara finally succeeded to do so, during the 2013 Bangladesh Championship League season. The club finished runners up behind Chittagong Abahani Limited, with 6 wins from 14 league games. The teams start striker Nabib Newaj Jibon caught the eyes of top-tier teams, with 12 goals in 13 games, he was the most prolific player for Uttar Baridhara during their promotion to the Bangladesh Premier League.

=== 2014–present ===
Since 2013, the club has been promoted to Bangladesh Premiere League twice and also relegated twice. Here is the professional league records of the club:

Season	League	Performance	Note	Reference
2013-14	BPL	10/10	Relegated to BCL after one season.	
2014-15	BCL	1/8, Champion	The club was promoted to BPL for second time.	
2016	BPL	12/12	Relegated to BCL again.	
2017	BCL	6/10		
2018-19	BCL	2/11, Runners-up	Promoted to BPL after two seasons	

== Sponsors ==
Period	Kit Manufacturer	Shirt Sponsor
2014–2015	-	BSB Cambrian
2015–2018	-	-
2019–2022	-	Saif Power Tech Limited

== Stadium ==
During 2013–14 BPL season, the club used Bangabandhu National Stadium as their home venue.

== Current squad ==
As of 22 May 2025

Note: Flags indicate national team as defined under FIFA eligibility rules; some limited exceptions apply. Players may hold more than one non-FIFA nationality.

No.	Pos.	Nation	Player
1	GK	BAN	Showkat Mia
2	DF	BAN	Md Hasibul Hasan Shanto
3	DF	BAN	Md Arif Khan Joy
5	DF	BAN	Md Saimon
6	DF	BAN	Md Tawhid Hasan
7	FW	BAN	Faisal Ahmed Shitol
9	FW	BAN	Arman Hossain
10	FW	BAN	Md Sujon Biswas (Captain)
11	FW	BAN	Md Maruf Ahmed
12	MF	BAN	Md Rakibul Islam
14	DF	BAN	Md Apon Shorker
15	MF	BAN	Md Rahat
16	MF	BAN	Anik Ghosh
18	FW	BAN	Md Mishu Miah
18	FW	BAN	Md Abu Musa
19	FW	BAN	Shawon Ritchil

No.	Pos.	Nation	Player
20	MF	BAN	Shifur Rahman Asif
21	MF	BAN	Md Rimon
23	DF	BAN	Munna Ahmed
24	DF	BAN	Ruknuzzaman
25	GK	BAN	Md Tanvir Ahamed
28	FW	BAN	Md Sahid Islam
29	FW	BAN	Md Tariqul Islam
30	FW	BAN	Molthigim Alam Himel
31	FW	BAN	Md Ridoy
32	FW	BAN	Md Mohashin Moko
33	DF	BAN	Arman Sadi
34	GK	BAN	Md Mehedi Islam Rabbani
35	FW	BAN	Md Ayat Alam
36	DF	BAN	Mafujur Rahman Atik
36	MF	BAN	Md Repok Shaik
36	MF	BAN	Redowan Hasan Lingkon

== Personnel ==
=== Current coaching staff ===
As of 22 May 2025

Position	Name
Head coach	(Bangladesh) Md Jashim Mehedi
Team Coach	(Bangladesh) Md Asaduzzaman
Assistant Coach	(Bangladesh) Shahidul Islam Swopon
Media Officer	(Bangladesh) Rased Bin Solaiman
Team Manager	(Bangladesh) Harun Or Rashid
Assistant Manager	(Bangladesh) Md Shamsuzzaman
Trainer	(Bangladesh) Moinul Hassan Nishu
Masseur	(Bangladesh) Md Shakib (Bangladesh) Md Emon
Security Officer	(Bangladesh) Md Saiful Islam

== Team records ==
=== Head coach records ===
As of 22 May 2025

Head Coach	Nat	From	To	P	W	D	L	GS	GA	%W
Alfaz Ahmed	(Bangladesh)	11 November 2019	14 March 2020	8	0	1	7	5	15	0.00
Jahidur Rahman Milon	(Bangladesh)	April 2020	March 2021	15	3	6	6	24	29	20.00
Kamal Babu	(Bangladesh)	March 2021	November 2021	13	3	1	9	15	40	23.08
Ali Asgar Nasir	(Bangladesh)	1 November 2021	25 August 2022	28	3	7	18	25	68	10.71
Md Harun Or Rashid	(Bangladesh)	2 December 2024	14 April 2025	9	2	2	5	10	16	22.22
Md Jashim Mehedi	(Bangladesh)	15 April 2025	Present	9	1	5	3	8	8	11.11

P-Total of played matches W-Won matches D-Draw matches L-Lost matches GS-Goals scored GA-Goals against
%W- Percentage of matches won

== Honours ==
- Bangladesh Championship League
  - Champions (1): 2014–15
  - Runners-up (3): 2012, 2013, 2018–19
- Dhaka Second Division League
  - Champions (1): 2007–08
- Dhaka Third Division League
  - Champions (1): 2003–04
