= Danilo Quipapá =

Brazilian footballer (born 1994)

Personal information
- Full name: Danilo Augusto Chapoval de Azevedo
- Date of birth: 21 February 1994 (age 32)
- Place of birth: Roraima, Brazil
- Height: 1.93 m (6 ft 4 in)
- Position: Centre-back

Team information
- Current team: Bangladesh Police
- Number: 71

Senior career*
Years	Team	Apps	(Gls)
2010–2014	Náutico		
2015	Vera Cruz	11	(1)
2016	Belo Jardim	13	(1)
2017	Serra Talhada	15	(0)
2018	Central	17	(2)
2019	Birkirkara	21	(1)
2019–2021	Minerva Punjab	13	(1)
2021–2022	Bangladesh Police	20	(3)
2022–2023	Fortis	17	(2)
2023	→ Dhaka Abahani (loan)	0	(0)
2024–2025	Delhi	6	(0)
2025–	Bangladesh Police	8	(3)
- * Club domestic league appearances and goals as of 23:41, 27 May 2025 (UTC)

Danilo Augusto Chapoval de Azevedo (born 21 February 1994) is a Brazilian professional footballer who plays as a defender for Bangladesh Football League club Bangladesh Police.

== Club career ==
Born in Brazil, Danilo joined the squad of Série A side Náutico, in the 2014 season. However, he didn't play any matches for the side. On 31 August 2019, he joined Minerva Punjab on a free deal from Central.

On 4 November 2021, Danilo joined Bangladesh Premier League club Bangladesh Police, he was integral for the club during his lone year and was also made the club's captain. Danilo remained in Bangladesh the following season by joining newly promoted corporate club Fortis FC, on 4 August 2022.
