= 2021–22 Rahmatganj MFS season =

Rahmatganj MFS 2021–22 football season

Rahmatganj MFS
2021–22 season
- Chairman: Haji Mohammad Salim
- Head coach: Syed Golam Jilani
- Stadium: Sylhet District Stadium
- Bangladesh Premier League: 10th
- Federation Cup: Runners-up
- Independence Cup: Group stages
- Top goalscorer: League: (Ghana) Philip Adjah (Nigeria) Sunday Chizoba (8 goals each); All: (Ghana) Philip Adjah (13 goals)
- Biggest win: 7–1 Vs Muktijoddha Sangsad KC (4 July 2022)
- Biggest defeat: 0–7 Vs Dhaka Mohammedan (2 August 2022)

The 2021–22 season was Rahmatganj MFS's 89th competitive since its establishment in 1933 and its 12th season in the Bangladesh Premier League. In addition to the domestic league, Rahmatganj MFS are participating in this season's edition of the Federation Cup and the Independence Cup. The season covered the period from 1 October 2021 to 2 August 2021.

== Season summary ==
=== December ===
On 3 December 2021, Rahmatganj began their season with a 2–3 loss against newly promoted side Swadhinata KS, in the first match of the 2021–22 Independence Cup. Philip Adjah gave Rahmatganj MFS the lead within 3 minutes; however, in the 16th minute, the score was leveled by Rafał Zaborowski. In the 25th minute, a goal by Sanowar Hossain had Rahmatganj MFS finish first-half with score 2–1. In the second half scored level by Swadhinata KS Nedo Turković on 50 minutes. At 80 minutes an own goal by Mohammad Al-Amin gave lead 3–2 lead and Swadhinata KS ensured the win.

On 7 December, Rahmatganj MFS were defeated 3–1 by Dhaka Abahani. At 14 minutes, thanks to an own goal by Dhaka Abahani's Tutul Hossain Badsha, Rahmatganj MFS took the lead. However, after 4 minutes, Brazilian forward Dorielton equalized the score. In the second half, at 50 minutes, a penalty goal by Raphael Augusto and at 70 minutes a penalty goal by Dorielton ended the game 3–1, resulting in the club being eliminated from the Independence Cup.

On 28 December, Rahmatganj MFS began their 2021–22 Federation Cup campaign with a 3–0 win against Muktijoddha Sangsad KC by FIFA walkover laws. The match was scheduled to be played on the scheduled date, but Muktijoddha withdrew their name from the tournament. As per FIFA walkover laws, the opposition club was declared the winner of the match.

On 30 December, Rahmatganj MFS drew 1–1 against Sheikh Jamal DC. Seven minutes in, Nurul Absar's goal gave Sheikh Jamal DC the lead and they finished the first half with a lead. In the second half, additional time 90+1 minutes, a goal by Sajidur Rahman Sajid equaled the score. Due to Muktijoddha Sangsad KC's withdrawal, both teams' points were equal in the group stage and the referee used penalty shoot out to the determined group champion, which Sheikh Jamal DC won 5–0.

=== January ===
On 3 January, Rahmatganj MFS lost 3–4 goals to Sheikh Russel KC. In the first half, Rahmatganj MFS Philip Adjah scored two goals on 28, 45 minutes finished first half with a score 2–0. In the second half fought back Sheikh Russel KC Thiago Amaral score on 63 minutes made scored 2–1. In the 82 minutes Aizar Akmatov scored a penalty goal and Ailton Machado on 84 minutes made the score 3–2. In the 89th minute, Rahmatganj Nigerian Sunday Chizoba levelled the scoreline 3–3. In the extra time on 118 minutes goal by Khondoker Ashraful Islam secured Rahmatganj MFS Semi-finals place.

On 6 January, Rahmatganj MFS won 2–1 against Dhaka Mohammedan in their first semi-final of the Federation Cup. At 5 minutes Rajib Hossain gave the lead to Dhaka Mohammedan until the end of half-time. In the second half, on 67 minutes, Philip Adjah equalised for Rahmatganj and levelled the score at 1–1 and in extra time (90+1 minutes), after Adjah outpaced Sadekujaman Fahim, Sunday Chizoba secured the winning goal for Rahmatganj MFS.

On 9 January, Rahmatganj MFS lost 2–1 to Dhaka Abahani in the final of the Federation Cup Bangladesh. In the first half, both clubs played excellently, but they wouldn't score any goals until Dainiel Colindres scored at 45+1 minutes. In the second half, Rakib Hossain extended the score 2–0. At 70 minutes Philip Adjah's goal made the score 2–1 and Rahmatganj MFS finished their tournament journey with the runner up trophy and Dhaka Abahani grabbed the12th Federation Cup trophy.

=== February ===
On 5 February 2022, Rahmatganj began their 2021–22 Bangladesh Premier League season with a 2–1 defeat to Chittagong Abahani.In the first half, within 4 minutes, a goal by Philip Adjah helped Rahmatganj take the lead and, finished the first half with a 1–0 lead. But in the second half Peter Ebimobowei's goal at the 52nd minute leveled the score 1–1. At 72 minutes a goal by Rubel Miya allowed Chittagong Abahani to take the lead, making the score 2–1. In the end, the Rahmatganj MFS players kept on attacking to find the equalizer, however, they could not succeed in salvaging a goal.

On 9 February, Rahmatganj MFS had their home game versus Saif Sporting Club and lost by 1–3 goals. In the first half on 16 minutes a goal by Foysal Ahmed Fahim and at 40 minutes, a goal by Nigerian Emeka Ogbugh took the lead before ended of half time. In the second half, at 66 minutes a goal by Maraz Hossain Saif SC made the scoreline 0–3. After conceding 3 goals Rahmatganj MFS playing attacking football and at 71 minutes a goal scored by Nigerian forward Sunday Chizoba, making the score 1–3 until the game finished.

On 13 February, Rahmatganj MFS lost by 3 goals in an away match against Dhaka Abahani. In the first half at the 40th, 43rd and 45+1 minutes a hat trick by Dorielton took lead with 3–0. In the second half Rahamtganj MFS tried to fought back but Dhaka Abahani players kept them in check to avoid any score. Dhaka Abahani left the field with full three points.

On 17 February, Rahmatganj MFS drew 3–3 against Sheikh Jamal DC at home. In the first half at 23 minutes Gambian forward Solomon King Kanform goal took lead and his second goals on 43 minutes finished halftime with lead 2–0. In the second half on 68 minutes Tajikistan forward Siyovush Asrorov goal made scoreline 2–1. Afternoon 6 minutes a goal by Mohammed Atikuzzaman lead the score 3–1 but the lead was retained till 89 minutes before score Sunday Chizoba on 90 minutes and Lancine Touré on 90+4 minutes. The match ended with result 3–3 goals.

On 22 February, Rahmatganj MFS lost to Bashundhara Kings by 3–2 goals in the away match. In the first half Rahmatganj MFS Nigerian forward Sunday Chizoba goal on 28 minutes took the lead Rahmatganj MFS but between 4 minutes Brazilian Robinho equalized scored 1–1. At 44 minutes Mohammad Ibrahim goal gave lead to Basundhara Kings made score 2–1. In the last minutes of half time second penalty goal by Sunday Chizoba on 45+3 minutes finished halftime with 2–2. In the second half on 75 minutes Yeasin Khan goal secured victory for Bashundhara Kings 3–2.

=== March ===
On 2 March, Rahmatganj MFS won against Uttar Baridhara Club by 3–1 goals at home. In the first half Ghanaian forward Philip Adjah's goal at the 32nd minute got lead Rahmatganj MFS but on 41 minutes Uttar Baridhara Club Uzbekistan midfielder Yevgeniy Kochnev goals leveled the score 1–1. After 2 minutes Philip Adjah scored again and made the score 2–1 before go to halftime break. In the second half midfielder Enamul Islam Gazi's 73rd-minute goal helped them to win the game by 3–1.

On 7 March, Rahmatganj MFS won against Muktijoddha Sangsad KC by 1–0 goals in the away match.

On 12 March, Rahmatganj MFS lost by 1–2 goals against Bangladesh Police FC at home stadium.

On 16 March, Rahmatganj MFS drew by 1–1 goals against Swadhinata KS at home ground. In the first half both teams played excellent and competitive football and at the end of the first half scoreline was 0–0. In the second half on 56 minutes Ghanaian forward Philip Adjah goal took lead Rahmatganj MFS but the club was not able to defend score for a long Swadhinata KS forward Zilliur Rahman goal on 64 minutes equalized score 1–1 goals. Rest of the time were not score any goals and both are share points.

=== April ===
On 4 April, Rahmatganj MFS drew against Sheikh Russel KC by 1–1 goals at the away game. At 4 minutes a goal by Nigerian forward Sunday Chizoba Rahmatganj MFS took early lead but between one minutes goal by Mohammad Jewel Sheikh Russel KC equalized score 1–1 and they have finished first halftime. In the second 45 minutes both teams play goalless until end the game.

On 8 April, Rahmatganj MFS lost by 1–5 goals against Dhaka Mohammedan at home match.

On 25 April, Rahmatganj MFS drew against Chittagong Abahani by 0–0 at home ground.

=== May ===
On 7 May, Rahmatganj MFS have lost 1–2 goals against Dhaka Abahani at home.

On 12 May, Rahmatganj MFS lost 0–1 in the away game against Sheikh Jamal DC.

=== June ===
On 21 June, Rahmatganj MFS lost against Bashundhara Kings by 0–2 at home ground.

On 27 June, Rahmatganj MFS drew by 1–1 goals versus Uttar Baridhara Club in the away match.

=== July ===
On 4 July, Rahmatganj MFS thrashed Muktijoddha Sangsad KC with score 7–1 at home ground.

On 15 July, Rahmatganj MFS drew against Bangladesh Police FC by 0–0 goal in the away game.

On 21 July, Rahmatganj MFS won by 5–1 goals against Swadhinata KS in the away game.

On 27 July, Rahmatganj MFS lost 2–3 goals versus Sheikh Russel KC at home ground.

=== August ===
On 2 August, Rahmatganj MFS destroyed to Dhaka Mohammedan by 0–7 goals in the away game.

== Transfer ==
=== In ===
No.	Pos	Player	Previous club	Fee	Date	Source
17	MF	(Bangladesh) Mamunul Islam	(Bangladesh) Dhaka Mohammedan	Not disclosed	17 April 2022	

== Current squad ==
As of 8 February 2022

Note: Flags indicate national team as defined under FIFA eligibility rules; some limited exceptions apply. Players may hold more than one non-FIFA nationality.

No.	Pos.	Nation	Player
1	GK	BAN	Ziaur Rhaman Hossain
2	DF	TJK	Siyovush Asrorov
3	DF	BAN	Wali Faisal
4	DF	BAN	Mohammad Tarek
5	DF	BAN	Mahmudul Hasan Kiron
6	MF	BAN	Mezabah Uddin
7	FW	BAN	Mohamed Shadhin
8	MF	BAN	Sanowar Hossain
9	FW	GHA	Philip Adjah
10	FW	NGR	Sunday Chizoba
11	MF	BAN	Khondoker Ashraful Islam
12	MF	BAN	Enamul Islam Gazi
13	DF	BAN	Imran Hossain Rubel
14	MF	BAN	Mehebub Nayan
15	DF	BAN	Akkas Ali
16	MF	BAN	Fazlay Rabbi
17	MF	BAN	Noyon Mia
18	DF	BAN	Mohammad Sharif
19	DF	BAN	Shahriar Bappy
20	FW	BAN	Sabbir Ahmed
21	DF	BAN	Mohammad Al Amin
22	GK	BAN	Rakibul Hasan Tusher
23	FW	CIV	Lancine Touré
24	MF	BAN	Rofiqul Islam
25	MF	BAN	Kamal Hossain Titu
26	DF	BAN	Naimur Rahman Shahed
27	MF	BAN	Zahidul Islam Babu
28	MF	BAN	Mohammed Fahim Nur Toha
29	MF	BAN	Mohammed Sahedul Hasan Anik
30	GK	BAN	Arman Hossain
32	DF	BAN	Jahangir Alam Sajeeb
33	DF	BAN	Omar Linkcon

== Pre-season friendly ==
Win Draw Loss Fixtures

19 January 2022 Friendly	Bashundhara Kings	0–1	Rahmatganj MFS	Dhaka
15:00			Adjah 29'	Stadium: Bashundhara Sports Complex

24 November 2021	Abahani Ltd. Dhaka	1–0	Rahmatganj MFS	Dhaka
15:00 BST (UTC+6)	Emon			Stadium: Abahani Field

== Competitions ==
=== Overview ===
Competition	First match	Last match	Final Position
Independence Cup	3 December 2021	7 December 2021	Group stages
Federation Cup	28 December 2021	9 January 2022	Runners-up
BPL	5 February 2022	2 August 2022	10th

=== Overview ===
Competition	Record							
Competition	Pld	W	D	L	GF	GA	GD	Win %
BPL	22	4	6	12	33	45	−12	18.18
Independence Cup	2	0	0	2	3	6	−3	0.00
Federation Cup	5	4	0	1	11	6	+5	80.00
Total	29	8	6	15	47	57	−10	27.59

Source: Competitions

=== Independence Cup ===
==== Group A ====
Pos	Team	Pld	W	D	L	GF	GA	GD	Pts	Status
1	Dhaka Abahani	2	2	0	0	5	2	+3	6	Qualified for Knockout stage
2	Swadhinata KS	2	1	0	1	4	4	0	3	Qualified for Knockout stage
3	Rahmatganj MFS	2	0	0	2	3	6	−3	0	

Source: Global Sports Archive
Rules for classification: Group stage tiebreakers

3 December 2021	Rahmatganj MFS	2–3	Swadhinata KS	Dhaka
17:45 BST (UTC+6)	Philip 3'; Sanowar 25'	Report	Rafal 16', 72'; Nedo 50'	Stadium: BSSS Mostafa Kamal Stadium; Referee: Md Alamgir Sarkar

7 December 2021	Dhaka Abahani	3–1	Rahmatganj MFS	Dhaka
17:45 BST (UTC+6)	Dorielton (17 (pen.)), 50'; Raphael 70' (pen.)	Report	Tutul 14' (o.g.)	Stadium: BSSS Mostafa Kamal Stadium; Referee: Bituraj Barua

=== Federation Cup ===
==== Group D ====
Pos	Team	Pld	W	D	L	GF	GA	GD	Pts	Status
1	Sheikh Jamal DC	2	1	1	0	4	1	+3	4 (Note: As the fair play points of the two teams were equal, the group champion and runners-up were determined through a penalty shootout. Sheikh Jamal DC (5–4) Rahmatganj MFS.)	Advance to Knockout stage
2	Rahmatganj MFS	2	1	1	0	4	1	+3	4	Advance to Knockout stage
3	Muktijoddha Sangsad KS	2	0	0	2	0	6	−6	0	Later withdrew

Source: Soccerway
Rules for classification: Group stage tiebreakers
Notes:

28 December 2021	Muktijoddha Sangsad KC	0–3; Walkover	Rahmatganj MFS	Dhaka
18:45 BST (UTC+6)		Report		Stadium: BSSS Mostafa Kamal Stadium
Note: Rahmatganj MFS were awarded walkover win by 3 goals since Muktijoddha Sangsad KC didn't turn up for the match

30 December 2021	Rahmatganj MFS	1–1 (5–4 p)	Sheikh Jamal DC	Dhaka
16:00 BST (UTC+6)	Sajidur 90+1'	Report	Absar 7'	Stadium: BSSS Mostafa Kamal Stadium; Referee: Saymoon Hasan Sany

==== Knockout stage ====
3 January 2022 Quarter-finals	Sheikh Russel KC	3–4 (a.e.t.)	Rahmatganj MFS	Dhaka
16:30 BST (UTC+6)	Amaral 63'; Akmatov 82' (pen.); Ailton 84'	Report	Adjah 28', 45'; Sunday 89'; Ashraful 118'	Stadium: BSSS Mostafa Kamal Stadium; Referee: Bituraj Borua

6 January 2022 Semi-finals	Dhaka Mohammedan	1–2	Rahmatganj MFS	Dhaka
16:30 BST (UTC+6)	Rajib 5'	Report	Adjah 67'; Sunday 90+1'	Stadium: BSSS Mostafa Kamal Stadium; Referee: Mohammed Jalaluddin

9 January 2022 Final	Rahmatganj MFS	1–2	Dhaka Abahani	Dhaka
17:00 BST (UTC+6)	Adjah 70'	Report	Colindres 45+1'; Rakib 64'	Stadium: BSSS Mostafa Kamal Stadium; Attendance: Bituraj Borua

=== Premier League ===
==== League table ====
Pos	Team	Pld	W	D	L	GF	GA	GD	Pts	Qualification or relegation
8	Bangladesh Police FC	22	8	6	8	28	32	−4	30	
9	Muktijoddha Sangsad KC	22	5	4	13	27	42	−15	19	
10	Rahmatganj MFS	22	4	6	12	33	46	−13	18	
11	Uttar Baridhara Club (R)	22	3	5	14	24	58	−34	14	Relegation to Bangladesh Championship League
12	Swadhinata KS (R)	22	2	4	16	22	50	−28	10	Relegation to Bangladesh Championship League

Source: Soccerway
Rules for classification: 1) Points; 2) Goal difference; 3) Goals scored.
(R) Relegated

==== Results summary ====
Overall								Home						Away					
Pld	W	D	L	GF	GA	GD	Pts	W	D	L	GF	GA	GD	W	D	L	GF	GA	GD
22	4	6	12	33	46	−13	18	2	3	6	20	23	−3	2	3	6	13	23	−10

Source: Soccerway

==== Results by round ====
Round	1	2	3	4	5	6	7	8	9	10	11	12	13	14	15	16	17	18	19	20	21	22
Ground	A	H	A	H	A	H	A	H	H	A	H	H	A	H	A	H	A	H	A	A	H	A
Result	L	L	L	D	L	W	W	L	D	D	L	D	L	L	L	L	D	W	D	W	L	L
Position	11	11	12	12	12	9	8	9	8	8	9	9	9	9	10	11	11	9	9	9	9	10

Source: Matches
A = Away; H = Home; W = Win; D = Draw; L = Loss; P = Postponed

=== Matches ===
5 February 2022 1	Chittagong Abahani	2–1	Rahmatganj MFS	Munshigonj
15:00 BST (UTC+6)	Peter 52'; Rubel 72'	Report	M. Kiron (yellow card) 1'; Adjah 4'	Stadium: Munshigonj District Stadium; Referee: Md Anisur Rahman

9 February 2022 2	Rahmatganj MFS	1–3	Saif Sporting Club	Munshigonj
15:00 BST (UTC+6)	Tarek (yellow card) 30'; Sunday 71'	Report	Fahim 16'; Gafurov (yellow card) 21'; Jamal (yellow card) 36'; Emeka 40'; Maraz 66'	Stadium: Munshigonj District Stadium; Referee: Md Mizanur Rahman

13 February 2022 3	Dhaka Abahani	3–0	Rahmatganj MFS	Gazipur
15:00 BST (UTC+6)	Dorielton 40', 43', 45+1'	Report		Stadium: Shaheed Ahsan Ullah Master Stadium; Referee: Azad Rahman

17 February 2022 4	Rahmatganj MFS	3–3	Sheikh Jamal DC	Sylhet
15:00 BST (UTC+6)	Rabby (yellow card) 25'; Sanoar (yellow card) 42'; Rakibul (yellow card) 71'; Asrorov 68' (yellow card) 76'; Sunday 90'; Touré 90+4'	Report	Solomon 22', 43'; Yeasin (yellow card) 45+1'; Atikuzzaman 74'	Stadium: Sylhet District Stadium; Referee: Mahmud Jamal Faruqee Nahid

22 February 2022 5	Bashundhara Kings	3–2	Rahmatganj MFS	Dhaka
15:00 BST (UTC+6)	Robinho 32'; Ibrahim 44'; Yeasin 75'; Sohel (yellow card) 87'	Report	Mehbub (yellow card) 17'; Touré (yellow card) 20'; Sunday 28', 45+3' (pen.)	Stadium: Bashundhara Kings Arena; Referee: Golam Mourshed Chowdhury Nayon

2 March 2022 6	Rahmatganj MFS	3–1	Uttar Baridhara Club	Sylhet
15:00 BST (UTC+6)	Adjah 32', 44'; Enamul 73'; Zahirul (red card) 90+3'	Report	Rashid (yellow card) 19'; Kochnev 41'; Saiful (yellow card) 45'; Jewel (yellow card) 45+1'	Stadium: Sylhet District Stadium; Referee: Bituraj Barua

7 March 2022 7	Muktijoddha Sangsad KC	0–1	Rahmatganj MFS	Gopalganj
15:00 BST (UTC+6)	Roman (yellow card) 30'	Report	Camara 57' (o.g.)	Stadium: Sheikh Fazlul Haque Mani Stadium; Referee: Md Anisur Rahman

12 March 2022 8	Rahmatganj MFS	1–2	Bangladesh Police FC	Sylhet
15:00 BST (UTC+6)	Philip (yellow card) 85'; Sunday 89' (yellow card) 94'	Report	Adil 11'; Joyonto (yellow card) 41'; Denilson (yellow card) 85'; Danilo 90+5' (pen.)	Stadium: Sylhet District Stadium; Referee: Md Symoon Hasan

18 March 2022 9	Rahmatganj MFS	1–1	Swadhinata KS	Sylhet
15:00 BST (UTC+6)	Tarek (yellow card) 32'; Enamul (yellow card) 51'; Philip 56'	Report	Zillur 64' (yellow card) 65'; Salim (yellow card) 77'	Stadium: Sylhet District Stadium; Referee: Mohammed Jalal Uddin

4 April 2022 10	Sheikh Russel KC	1–1	Rahmatganj MFS	Dhaka
15:30 BST (UTC+6)	Jewel 5'	Report	Sunday 4'	Stadium: Bashundhara Kings Arena; Referee: Md Mizanur Rahman

8 April 2022 11	Rahmatganj MFS	1–5	Dhaka Mohammedan	Sylhet
16:15 BST (UTC+6)	Adjah (yellow card) 36' (goal) 45+2'	Report	Souleymane 33', 48', 51'; Forhad 41'; Habib (yellow card) 62'; Jafar 70'	Stadium: Sylhet District Stadium; Referee: Bituraj Barua

25 April 2022 12	Rahmatganj MFS	0–0	Chittagong Abahani	Rajshahi
15:45 BST (UTC+6)	Kiron (yellow card) 66'		Sakhawat (yellow card) 50'	Stadium: Rajshahi District Stadium; Referee: Alamgir Sarker

30 April 2022 13	Saif Sporting Club	4–2	Rahmatganj MFS	Munshigonj
15:30 BST (UTC+6)	Emery 4' (yellow card) 45+4'; Hossain Opi (yellow card) 16'; Emeka 8', 78'; Udoh 58'	Report	Enamul 62'; Ashraful 75'	Stadium: Munshigonj District Stadium; Referee: Mohammad Jalaluddin

7 May 2022 14	Rahmatganj MFS	1–2	Dhaka Abahani	Sylhet
15:45 BST (UTC+6)	Sajeeb (yellow card) 35'; Mezbah 90+2'	Report	Mehedi 14'; Jewel 22'; Sushanto (yellow card) 42'; Soleimani (yellow card) 60'	Stadium: Sylhet District Stadium; Referee: Alamgir Sarker

12 May 2022 15	Sheikh Jamal DC	1–0	Rahmatganj MFS	Munshigonj
15:45 BST (UTC+6)	Najere 6'; Rayhan (yellow card) 86'		Sunday (yellow card) 45+3'; Asrorov (yellow card) 45+4'	Stadium: Munshigonj District Stadium; Referee: Bituraj Barua

21 June 2022 16	Rahmatganj MFS	0–2	Bashundhara Kings	Sylhet
15:30 BST (UTC+6)	Ziaur (red card) 33'	Report	Miguel 36'; Robinho 39'; Shafiei (yellow card) 90+3'	Stadium: Sylhet District Stadium; Referee: Md Alamgir Sarker

28 June 2022 17	Uttar Baridhara Club	1–1	Rahmatganj MFS	Gopalganj
15:30 BST (UTC+6)	Mostafa (yellow card) 36'; Sujon (yellow card) 63'; Kochnev (yellow card) 65'; Rashed (yellow card) 77'; Youssouf 90+2'	Report	Enamul (yellow card) 36'; Asrorov (yellow card) 39'; Sunday 80'	Stadium: Sheikh Fazlul Haque Mani Stadium; Referee: Bituraj Barua

4 July 2022 18	Rahmatganj MFS	7–1	Muktijoddha Sangsad KC	Munshigonj
15:30 BST (UTC+6)	Philip 25', 89' (pen.), 90+3'; Sunday 37'; Touré (yellow card) 45+4'; Mehebub (yellow card) 51'; Al Amin 69'; Touré 80'; Ashraful 86'	Report	Obidur 45+2'	Stadium: Munshigonj District Stadium; Referee: Mohammed Jalaluddin

15 July 2022 19	Bangladesh Police FC	0–0	Rahmatganj MFS	Rajshahi
16:00 BST (UTC+6)		Report	Ashraful (yellow card) 33'	Stadium: Rajshahi District Stadium; Referee: Mohammed Nasir Uddin

21 July 2022 20	Swadhinata KS	1–5	Rahmatganj MFS	Rajshahi
16:00 BST (UTC+6)	Ivan 56' (pen.); Nasarul (yellow card) 88'	Report	Touré (yellow card) 17'; Philip 28'; Sunday 52', 68', 89' (pen.); Sanower 86'	Stadium: Rajshahi District Stadium; Referee: Bhubon Mohon Tarafder

27 July 2022 21	Rahmatganj MFS	2–3	Sheikh Russel KC	Munshigonj
16:00 BST (UTC+6)	Asrorov 88', 90+4' (pen.)	Report	Richard 37' (yellow card) 53'; Dipok 66', 76'	Stadium: Munshigonj District Stadium; Referee: Sujit Das

2 August 2022 22	Dhaka Mohammedan	7–0	Rahmatganj MFS	Comilla
16:00 BST (UTC+6)	Asif 17'; Rajib (yellow card) 39'; Moneke 40'; Alamgir (yellow card) 49'; Souleymane 33', 67', 77', 79'; Sahed 90+4'	Report	Kiron (yellow card) 37'; Tareq (yellow card) 5' (yellow-red card) 51'	Stadium: Comilla District Stadium; Referee: Anisur Rahman

=== Goalscorers ===
As of match played till 2 August 2022

Rank	Player	Position	Total	BPL	Independence Cup	Federation Cup
1	(Ghana) Philip Adjah	FW	13	8	1	4
2	(Nigeria) Sunday Chizoba	FW	11	8	0	3
3	(Bangladesh) Khondokar Ashraful Islam	FW	3	2	0	1
3	(Tajikistan) Siyovush Asrorov	MF	3	3	0	0
4	(Bangladesh) Enamul Islam Gazi	MF	2	2	0	0
4	(Ivory Coast) Lancine Touré	MF	2	2	0	0
5	(Bangladesh) Md Al Amin	DF	1	1	0	0
5	(Bangladesh) Sanowar Hossain	MF	1	0	1	0
5	(Bangladesh) Md Mezbah Uddin	MF	1	1	0	0
Total			37	27	2	8

Source: Matches
