= 2021–22 Mohammedan SC (Dhaka) season =

Mohammedan SC
2021–22 season
- President: Md Abdul Mubeen
- Head coach: Sean Brendan Lane
- Stadium: Comilla Stadium
- Bangladesh Premier League: 5th of 12
- Federation Cup: Semi-finals
- Independence Cup: Group stage
- Top goalscorer: League: Souleymane Diabate (26 goals); All: Souleymane Diabate (28 goals)
- Biggest win: 7–0 Vs Rahmatganj MFS (2 August 2022)
- Biggest defeat: 2–4 Vs Dhaka Abahani (22 June 2022)

The 2021–22 season was the Mohammedan SC's 86th season in existence and 14th consecutive season in Bangladesh Premier League since the league's establishment in 2007. In addition to domestic league, Dhaka Mohammedan SC are participated on this season's edition of Federation Cup and Independence Cup. This season was covered period from 1 October 2021 to 2 August 2022.

== Season summary ==
=== November ===
On 28 November Dhaka Mohammedan begun their season with winning 2–1 goals versus Muktijoddha Sangsad KC. Scored by Souleymane Diabate and Sahed Hossain confirmed their win.

=== December ===
On 2 December Dhaka Mohammedan played second match of the group against Bangladesh Army Football Team they have lost by 2–1 goals. Early goal by Ranju Shikdar and second half time scored by Shahriar Emon confirmed their win. At the end extra time a goal by Minhaj Abedin Ballu cannot avoid lost match.

On 6 December Dhaka Mohammedan meet against Saif Sporting Club and draw 1–1 goals. Goal scored by Saif Sporting Club Nigerian forward Mfon Udoh on 45 minutes and Mohammedan SC defender Rajib Hossain 90+1 minutes goal equalizied scored. Dhaka Mohammedan exist from 2021–22 Independence Cup (Bangladesh) group stage.

On 27 December Dhaka Mohammedan draw 1–1 against Swadhinata KS. On 39 minutes goal by Souleymane Diabate took lead Mohammedan but after a minute goal by Nedo Turković Swadhinata equal score. In the second half both teams were play goalless. To the determined group champion Referee and match commissioner were used penalty shoot out due to Bashundhara Kings withdrawn their name from the tournament. Dhaka Mohammedan won by 4–3 goals penalties shoot out.

=== January ===
On 2 January Dhaka Mohammedan won 2–1 goals versus Chittagong Abahani. In the first half both teams players were goalless. In the second half 65 minutes own goal by Chittgong Abahani Arafat Hossen took lead Dhaka Mohammeda. In the 73 minutes Shahriar Emon extended it 2–0 but late goals by Chittagong Abahani Peter Ebimobowei finished the game 2–1.

On 6 January Dhaka Mohammedan lost 1–2 goals against Rahmatganj MFS in their 1st Semi-finals of Federation Cup. On 5 minutes Rajib Hossain gave lead to Dhaka Mohammedan until end half time. In the second half on 67 minutes Philip Adjah scored for Rahmatganj and level score 1–1 but in the additional time 90+1 minutes Sunday Chizoba secured Final ticket for Rahmatganj MFS.

=== February ===
On 5 February Dhaka Mohammedan draw 1–1 goals against Sheikh Russel KC in the home match. On 24 minutes Souleyman Diabate goal took lead Dhaka Mohammedan. Sheikh Russel KC Md Saad Uddin shown red card on 24 minutes due to bad foul. Dhaka Mohammedan finished first half with 1–0 goal. In the second half on 67 minutes Md Masud Rana Dhaka Mohammedan shown red and sent him off and both teams played ten men squad. On 84 minutes Aizar Akmatov goal level the score 1–1 goals both teams finished the game with 1 point each.

On 10 February Dhaka Mohammedan defeated Swadhinata KS by 1–0 goal in the away match. In the first half both team are played excellent and competitive football at the end of first time scoreline were 0–0 goal. In the second half both team started attacking football to take lead and Dhaka Mohammedan got it by Souleymane Diabate on 77 minutes and made it 1–0 scoreline. In the 84 minutes Murad Hasan Swadhinata KS showed red card and sentoff him until end the match Swadhinata KS tried with their ten men's squad to find goal but they won't able avoid loss the game.

On 14 February Dhaka Mohammedan drew 1–1 goals against Chittagong Abahani in the away match. On 28 minutes a goal by Souleymane Diabate took the lead and made scoreline 1–0 before halftime. In the second half between 2 minutes on 47 minutes Kamrul Islam goal leveled the score 1–1 goals. Till ended the both teams has not score any goal and finished the game with a result 1–1 goals.

On 18 February Dhaka Mohammedan defeated Saif Sporting Club by 2–0 in the away match. In the first half on 32 minutes a goal by Souleymane Diabate took the lead Dhaka Mohammedan and hold the lead till end first halftime. In the second half in between 4 minutes a goal by Md Shahriar Emon Dhaka Mohammdan extended the lead 2–0. Rest of the time of second half Saif Sporting Club didn't able to score any goal and Dhaka Mohammdan got three points.

On 23 February Dhaka Mohammedan lost 0–1 goal against Dhaka Abahani at away match. In the first half on 28 minutes Sohel Rana goal took lead Dhaka Abahni and finished halftime with score 1–0. In the second half Dhaka Mohammedan tried to score goal to avoid lost the Dhaka Derby match of the season but they won't able to do it. Dhaka Abahai got victory against their rivery Dhaka Mohammedan 1–0 goal and they got place on top of BPL.

On 28 February Dhaka Mohammedan have drew 1–1 goals against Sheikh Jamal DC in the away match.

=== March ===
On 5 March Dhaka Mohammedan lost by 0–2 goals Bashundhara Kings in the away game. In the first half on 11 minutes a goal by Sumon Reza and on 19 minutes Brazilian forward Robson Bashundhara Kings made score 2–0 and they have ended first half with leading score 2–0. In the second half on 47 minutes Anik Hossain Dhaka Mohammedan sent off due to bad gesture and foul. Rest of the game Dhaka Mohammedan haven't able to come back in the match and Bashundhara Kings finished the match with 2–0 win.

On 12 March Dhaka Mohammedan drew by 0–0 goals against Uttar Baridhara Club in the away game. In the first half time and second half time both teams played excellent and competitive football but their players have not found the goal post and end of the game score remains 0–0 both teams share point.

=== April ===
On 4 April Dhaka Mohammedan drew versus Bangladesh Police FC with score 0–0 at their home ground.

On 8 April Dhaka Mohammedan got victory by 5–1 goals against Rahmatganj MFS in the away match.

On 25 April Dhaka Mohammedan have drew by 1–1 goals in the away game versus Sheikh Russel KC.

=== May ===
On 1 May Dhaka Mohammedan have won against Swadhinata KS by 3–2 at home ground.

On 8 May Dhaka Mohammedan have drew by 3–3 goals against Chittagong Abahani at home venue.

On 12 May Dhaka Mohammedan have lost to Saif Sporting Club by 1–3 goals at home ground.

=== June ===
On 22 June Dhaka Mohammedan have lost against Dhaka Abahani by 2–4 goals at home venue.

On 27 June Dhaka Mohammedan have won versus Sheikh Jamal DC the score 3–1 goals at home ground.

=== July ===
On 2 July Dhaka Mohammedan have drew versus Bashundhara Kings by 1–1 goals at home stadium.

On 15 July Dhaka Mohammedan have won by 3–0 goals against Uttar Baridhara Club at home ground.

On 21 July Dhaka Mohammedan have lost against Muktijoddha Sangsad KC 2–1 goals in the away match.

On 27 July Dhaka Mohammedan have drew against Bangladesh Police FC by 1–1 goals in the away match.

=== August ===
On 2 August Dhaka Mohammedan have won versus Rahmatganj MFS by 7–0 goals in the home game.

== Current squad ==
Mohammedan SC squad for 2021–22 season.

As of 24 November 2021

Note: Flags indicate national team as defined under FIFA eligibility rules; some limited exceptions apply. Players may hold more than one non-FIFA nationality.

| No. | Pos. | Nation | Player |
|---|---|---|---|
| 1 | GK | BAN | Ahsan Habib Bipu |
| 2 | DF | BAN | Masud Rana Mredha |
| 3 | DF | BAN | Rajib Hossain |
| 4 | DF | AUS | Aaron Reardon |
| 5 | DF | MKD | Jasmin Mecinovikj |
| 6 | MF | BAN | Anik Hossain |
| 8 | MF | BAN | Shamol Bepari |
| 9 | FW | BAN | Amir Hakim Bappy |
| 10 | FW | MLI | Souleymane Diabate |
| 11 | MF | BAN | Jafar Iqbal |
| 12 | MF | BAN | Sahed Hossain |
| 14 | DF | BAN | Algamir Mollah |
| 16 | MF | NGR | Ugochukwu Obi Moneke |
| 17 | MF | BAN | Mamunul Islam |
| 18 | MF | BAN | Shahriar Emon |
| 19 | DF | BAN | Abid Hossain |
| 20 | FW | BAN | Saief Samsud Nurat |

| No. | Pos. | Nation | Player |
|---|---|---|---|
| 21 | MF | BAN | Farhad Mona |
| 22 | GK | BAN | Shakib Al Hasan |
| 23 | DF | BAN | Sadat Hamid |
| 24 | MF | BAN | Ashraful Haque Asif |
| 25 | DF | BAN | Sadekujaman Fahim |
| 27 | MF | BAN | Minhaj Abedin Ballu |
| 29 | DF | BAN | Sagor Sarkar |
| 30 | GK | BAN | Sujon Hossain |
| 31 | DF | BAN | Hafijur Rahman Tapu |
| 32 | DF | BAN | Emon Khan |
| 33 | GK | BAN | Rakib Hossain |
| 34 | FW | BAN | Mirajul Islam |
| 37 | MF | BAN | Seikh Galib Newaz |
| 38 | MF | BAN | Nabil Arif Anwar Rahim |
| 39 | MF | BAN | Shekh Morsalin |
| 40 | FW | BAN | Abdul Muhaymin Hoque |

== Pre-season friendly ==
| 22 November 2021 | Bangladesh Police FC | 2–0 | Dhaka Mohammedan | Dhaka |
| 13:00 UTC+6 | Goal | | | Stadium: BSSS Mostafa Kamal Stadium |

| 24 November 2021 | Dhaka Mohammedan | 4–5 | Swadhinata KS | Dhaka |
| 14:00 UTC+6 | S. Diabate 4'; Bappy 26'; B. Famussa 56'; Anik 82' | | N. Turković 2', 24', 76', 89'; Rasel Ahmed 32' | Stadium: Mohammedan Practice Ground |

| 24 January 2022 | Dhaka Mohammedan | 2–0 | Saif Sporting Club | Dhaka |
| 13:30 UTC+6 | Nurat 16'; Diabate 23' | | | Stadium: Fortis Football Ground |

== Transfer ==
=== In ===
| No. | Pos | Player | Previous club | Fee | Date | Source |
|---|---|---|---|---|---|---|
| 24 | DF | (Bangladesh) Md Alauddin | (Bangladesh) Sheikh Jamal DC | Free transfer | 16 October 2021 | |
| 16 | MF | (Nigeria) Ugochukwu Obi Moneke | (Bangladesh) Sheikh Russel KC | Free transfer | 31 October 2021 | |
| — | MF | (Bangladesh) Shaver Khan | (United States) Golden Eagles US FC | Free transfer | 31 October 2021 | |
| 6 | MF | (Bangladesh) Mamunul Islam | (Bangladesh) Dhaka Abahani | Free | 18 November 2021 | |
| 5 | DF | (Australia) Aaron Reardon | (Australia) Port Melbourne SC | Free transfer | 22 November 2021 | |
| 24 | CB | (North Macedonia) Jasmin Mecinovikj | (North Macedonia) FC Struga | Free | 23 November 2021 | |
| 10 | FW | (Bangladesh) Mirazul Islam | (Bangladesh) BFF Elite Football Academy | 10,0000 BDT | 12 April 2022 | |
| 38 | FW | (England) Nabil Rahim | (England) Wigan Athletic Academy | Not disclosed | 12 April 2022 | |

=== Out ===
| No. | Pos | Player | Transferred to | Fee | Date | Source |
|---|---|---|---|---|---|---|
| 17 | MF | (Bangladesh) Mamunul Islam | (Bangladesh) Rahmatganj MFS | Not disclosed | 17 April 2022 | |
| 20 | MF | (Bangladesh) Saief Samsud Nurat | (Bangladesh) Swadhinata KS | Free transfer | 21 April 2022 | |

=== Loans in ===
| No. | Pos | Player | Loaned from | Fee | Date | On loan until | Source |
|---|---|---|---|---|---|---|---|
| 33 | MF | (Bangladesh) Shekh Morsalin | (Bangladesh) Bashundhara Kings | Not disclosed | 20 April 2022 | End of season | |

== Competitions ==
Win Draw Loss Fixture

=== Overall ===
| Competition | First match | Last match | Final Position |
|---|---|---|---|
| BPL | 5 February 2022 | 2 August 2022 | 5 of 12 |
| Federation Cup | 27 December 2021 | 6 January 2022 | Semi-finals |
| Independence Cup | 28 November 2021 | 6 December 2021 | Group stage |

=== Overview ===
| Competition | Record | | | | | | | |
| Competition | Pld | W | D | L | GF | GA | GD | Win % |
|---|---|---|---|---|---|---|---|---|
| BPL | 22 | 8 | 9 | 5 | 39 | 26 | +13 | 36.36 |
| Independence Cup | 3 | 1 | 1 | 1 | 4 | 4 | +0 | 33.33 |
| Federation Cup | 4 | 2 | 1 | 1 | 7 | 4 | +3 | 50.00 |
| Total | 29 | 11 | 11 | 7 | 50 | 34 | +16 | 37.93 |

Source: Competitions

=== Federation Cup ===
==== Group A ====
| Pos | Team | Pld | W | D | L | GF | GA | GD | Pts | Status |
|---|---|---|---|---|---|---|---|---|---|---|
| 1 | Dhaka Mohammedan | 2 | 1 | 1 | 0 | 4 | 1 | +3 | 4 (Note: As the fair play points of the two teams were equal, the group champion and runners-up were determined through a penalty shootout.Dhaka Mohammedan (4–3) Swadhinata KS.) | Advance to Knockout stage |
| 2 | Swadhinata KS | 2 | 1 | 1 | 0 | 4 | 1 | +3 | 4 | Advance to Knockout stage |
| 3 | Bashundhara Kings | 2 | 0 | 0 | 2 | 0 | 6 | −6 | 0 | Later withdrew |

Source: Soccerway
Rules for classification: Group stage tiebreakers
Notes:

| 27 December 2022 | Dhaka Mohammedan | 1–1 (4–3 p) | Swadhinata KS | Dhaka |
| 16:00 BST (UTC+6) | Diabate 39' | Report | Nedo 40' | Stadium: BSSS Mostafa Kamal Stadium; Referee: Md Anisur Rahman Sagor |
| | Penalties |
| | Diabate (penalty scored); Jasmin (penalty scored); Saief (penalty scored); Obi Moneke (penalty scored); Aaron (penalty missed) | | Nedo (penalty scored); Nodir (penalty scored); Samimul (penalty scored); Salim (penalty missed); Sajal (penalty missed) |

| 29 December 2022 | Bashundhara Kings | 0–3; Walkover | Dhaka Mohammedan | Dhaka |
| 18:45 BST (UTC+6) | | Report | | Stadium: BSSS Mostafa Kamal Stadium |
Note: Dhaka Mohammedan were awarded walkover win by 3 goals since Bashundhara Kings didn't turn up for the match

==== Knockout stage ====
| 2 January 2022 Quarter-finals | Dhaka Mohammedan | 2–1 | Chittagong Abahani | Dhaka |
| 16:30 BST (UTC+6) | Arafat 65' (o.g.); Emon 73' | Report | Peter 90+1' | Stadium: BSSS Mostafa Kamal Stadium; Referee: Md Anisur Rahman |

| 6 January 2022 Semi-finals | Dhaka Mohammedan | 1–2 | Rahmatganj MFS | Dhaka |
| 16:30 BST (UTC+6) | Rajib 5' | Report | Adjah 67'; Sunday 90+1' | Stadium: BSSS Mostafa Kamal Stadium; Referee: Mohammed Jalaluddin |

=== Independence Cup ===
==== Group C ====
| Pos | Team | Pld | W | D | L | GF | GA | GD | Pts | Status |
|---|---|---|---|---|---|---|---|---|---|---|
| 1 | Saif Sporting Club | 3 | 2 | 1 | 0 | 6 | 4 | +2 | 7 | Qualified for Knockout stage |
| 2 | Bangladesh Army | 3 | 1 | 1 | 1 | 4 | 4 | 0 | 4 | Qualified for Knockout stage |
| 3 | Dhaka Mohammedan | 3 | 1 | 1 | 1 | 4 | 4 | 0 | 4 | |
| 4 | Muktijoddha Sangsad KC | 3 | 0 | 1 | 2 | 4 | 6 | −2 | 1 | |

Source: Global Sports Archive
Rules for classification: Group stage tiebreakers

| 28 November 2021 | Dhaka Mohammedan SC | 2–2 | Muktijoddha Sangsad KC | Dhaka |
| 16:00 BST (UTC+6) | Diabate 36'; Sahed 50' | Report | Tetsuaki 70' | Stadium: BSSS Mostafa Kamal Stadium |

| 2 December 2021 | Bangladesh Army | 2–1 | Dhaka Mohammedan SC | Dhaka |
| 18:00 BST (UTC+6) | Ranju 18'; Emon 69' | Report | Minhaj 90+5' | Stadium: BSSS Mostafa Kamal Stadium; Referee: Bituraj Barua |

| 6 December 2021 | Saif Sporting Club | 1–1 | Dhaka Mohammedan SC | Dhaka |
| 18:00 BST (UTC+6) | Udoh 45' | Report | Rajib 90+1' | Stadium: BSSS Mostafa Kamal Stadium; Referee: GM Chowdhury Nayon |

=== Premier League ===
==== League table ====
| Pos | Team | Pld | W | D | L | GF | GA | GD | Pts |
|---|---|---|---|---|---|---|---|---|---|
| 3 | Saif Sporting Club | 22 | 11 | 4 | 7 | 58 | 37 | +21 | 37 |
| 4 | Sheikh Jamal DC | 22 | 9 | 8 | 5 | 34 | 31 | +3 | 35 |
| 5 | Dhaka Mohammedan | 22 | 8 | 9 | 5 | 39 | 26 | +13 | 33 |
| 6 | Sheikh Russel KC | 22 | 8 | 7 | 7 | 35 | 31 | +4 | 31 |
| 7 | Chittagong Abahani | 22 | 8 | 7 | 7 | 39 | 42 | −3 | 31 |

Source: Soccerway
Rules for classification: 1) Points; 2) Goal difference; 3) Goals scored.

==== Results summary ====
| Overall | | | | | | | | Home | | | | | | Away | | | | | |
| Pld | W | D | L | GF | GA | GD | Pts | W | D | L | GF | GA | GD | W | D | L | GF | GA | GD |
|---|---|---|---|---|---|---|---|---|---|---|---|---|---|---|---|---|---|---|---|
| 22 | 8 | 9 | 5 | 39 | 28 | +11 | 33 | 5 | 4 | 2 | 26 | 18 | +8 | 3 | 5 | 3 | 13 | 10 | +3 |

Source: Soccerway

==== Results by round ====
| Round | 1 | 2 | 3 | 4 | 5 | 6 | 7 | 8 | 9 | 10 | 11 | 12 | 13 | 14 | 15 | 16 | 17 | 18 | 19 | 20 | 21 | 22 |
|---|---|---|---|---|---|---|---|---|---|---|---|---|---|---|---|---|---|---|---|---|---|---|
| Ground | H | A | A | A | A | A | A | A | H | H | A | A | H | H | H | H | H | H | H | A | A | H |
| Result | D | W | D | W | L | D | L | D | W | D | W | D | W | D | L | L | W | D | W | L | D | W |
| Position | 6 | 5 | 6 | 4 | 5 | 6 | 7 | 7 | 6 | 7 | 5 | 6 | 6 | 6 | 6 | 6 | 6 | 7 | 6 | 5 | 5 | 5 |

Source: Matches
A = Away; H = Home; W = Win; D = Draw; L = Loss; P = Postponed

=== Matches ===
| 5 February 2022 1 | Dhaka Mohammedan | 1–1 | Sheikh Russel KC | Munshigonj |
| 15:00 BST (UTC+6) | J. Iqbal (yellow card) 22'; S Diabate 23'; M Rana (red card) 67'; M. Mona (yellow card) 89' | Report | M.Saad (yellow card) 16' (yellow-red card) 24'; A. Akmatov 84'; E. Isma (yellow card) 89' | Stadium: Munshigonj District Stadium; Referee: Md Symoon Hasan Sany |

| 10 February 2022 2 | Swadhinata KS | 0–1 | Dhaka Mohammedan | Munshigonj |
| 15:00 BST (UTC+6) | Murad (yellow card) 20' (yellow-red card) 84'; Shakil (yellow card) 62' | Report | Newaz (yellow card) 26'; Diabate (yellow card) 74' (goal) 77' | Stadium: Munshigonj District Stadium; Referee: Bituraj Barua |

| 14 February 2022 3 | Chittagong Abahani | 1–1 | Dhaka Mohammedan | Gazipur |
| 15:00 BST (UTC+6) | Kamrul 47'; Zahid (yellow card) 56'; Kawshik (yellow card) 59' | Report | Diabate 28'; Masud (yellow card) 59' (yellow-red card) 90+1'; Anik (yellow card) 90+4' | Stadium: Shaheed Ahsan Ullah Master Stadium; Referee: Saymoon Hasan Sany |

| 18 February 2022 4 | Saif Sporting Club | 0–2 | Dhaka Mohammedan | Munshigonj |
| 15:00 BST (UTC+6) | Bayisege (yellow card) 89'; Riyadul (yellow card) 90+2' | Report | Diabate 32'; Emon 49'; Forhad (yellow card) 53'; Sagar (yellow card) 68'; Anik (yellow card) 70' | Stadium: Munshigonj District Stadium; Referee: Bhubon Mohon Tarafder |

| 23 February 2022 5 | Dhaka Abahani | 1–0 | Dhaka Mohammedan | Sylhet |
| 15:00 BST (UTC+6) | Shahidul (yellow card) 4'; Rezaul (yellow card) 10' Sohel 28' Jewel (yellow card) 39' Jibon (yellow card) 45+1' | Report | Moneke (yellow card) 4' Jasmin (yellow card) 4' Masud (yellow card) 6' | Stadium: Sylhet District Stadium; Referee: Md Alamgir Sarker |

| 28 February 2022 6 | Sheikh Jamal DC | 1–1 | Dhaka Mohammedan | Munshigonj |
| 15:00 BST (UTC+6) | Shakil (yellow card) 14'; Solomon 32'; Ariful (yellow card) 71' | Report | Diabate 45+2'; Shamol (yellow card) 49'; Abid (yellow card) 69' | Stadium: Munshigonj District Stadium; Referee: Golam Mourshed Chowdhury |

| 5 March 2022 7 | Bashundhara Kings | 2–0 | Dhaka Mohammedan | Dhaka |
| 15:00 BST (UTC+6) | Sumon 11'; Robinho 19' (yellow card) 47'; Bishwanath (yellow card) 47'; Yeasin (yellow card) 88' | Report | Anik (yellow card) 14' (yellow-red card) 47' | Stadium: Bashundhara Kings Arena; Referee: Saimoon Hasan Sany |

| 12 March 2022 8 | Uttar Baridhara Club | 0–0 | Dhaka Mohammedan | Gopalganj |
| 15:30 BST (UTC+6) | Fozilov (yellow card) 5'; Papon (yellow card) 15'; Jewel (yellow card) 45+3'; Kochnev (yellow card) 57' | Report | Jasmin (yellow card) 56' | Stadium: Sheikh Fazlul Haque Mani Stadium; Referee: Mahmud Jamal Faruqee Nahid |

| 18 March 2022 9 | Dhaka Mohammedan | 2–1 | Muktijoddha Sangsad KC | Comilla |
| 15:30 BST (UTC+6) | Sahed 13'; Shamsud 17'; Emon (yellow card) 53'; Asif (yellow card) 55'; Jafar (yellow card) 63'; Jasmin (yellow card) 71' | Report | Camara (yellow card) 9'; Aminur 62' | Stadium: Comilla Stadium; Referee: Anisur Rahman |

| 4 April 2022 10 | Dhaka Mohammedan | 0–0 | Bangladesh Police FC | Comilla |
| 15:30 BST (UTC+6) | | Report | Al-Amin (yellow card) 61' | Stadium: Comilla Stadium; Referee: Bituraj Barua |

| 8 April 2022 11 | Rahmatganj MFS | 1–5 | Dhaka Mohammedan | Sylhet |
| 16:15 BST (UTC+6) | Adjah (yellow card) 36' (goal) 45+2' | Report | Souleymane 33', 48', 51'; Forhad 41'; Habib (yellow card) 62'; Jafar 70' | Stadium: Sylhet District Stadium; Referee: Bituraj Barua |

| 25 April 2022 12 | Sheikh Russel KC | 1–1 | Dhaka Mohammedan | Dhaka |
| 15:30 BST (UTC+6) | Jewel 21' | Report | Sujon (yellow card) 22' (yellow-red card) 80'; Jafar (yellow card) 76' (goal) 88'; Masud (yellow card) 83' | Stadium: Bashundhara Kings; Referee: Golam Murshed Chowdhury Nayan |

| 1 May 2022 13 | Dhaka Mohammedan | 3–2 | Swadhinata KS | Comilla |
| 15:30 BST (UTC+6) | Diabate 13'; Moneke 35'; Farhad (yellow card) 39' (yellow-red card) 43'; Sahed 41'; Reardon (yellow card) 90+2' | Report | Onin (yellow card) 25'; Rasel 86'; Bishal 89' | Stadium: Comilla Stadium; Referee: Bituraj Barua |

| 8 May 2022 14 | Dhaka Mohammedan | 3–3 | Chittagong Abahani | Comilla |
| 15:45 BST (UTC+6) | Diabate 2', 68', 90+5'; Masud (yellow card) 39'; Reardon (yellow card) 81' | | Peter 39' (pen.); Sakhawat 13', 26' (yellow card) 81' | Stadium: Comilla District Stadium; Referee: Golam Mourshed Chowdhury Nayon |

| 12 May 2022 15 | Dhaka Mohammedan | 1–3 | Saif Sporting Club | Comilla |
| 15:45 BST (UTC+6) | Jasmin (yellow card) 3'; Mona (yellow card) 11'; Rajib (yellow card) 43'; Jafar (yellow card) 53' (goal) 89' | Report | Mfon (yellow card) 5' (goal) 23'; Gafurov (yellow card) 18' (goal) 43'; Emeka 80' | Stadium: Comilla District Stadium; Referee: Alamgir Sarker |

| 22 June 2022 16 | Dhaka Mohammedan | 2–4 | Dhaka Abahani | Comilla |
| 16:00 BST (UTC+6) | Diabate 18'; Shahriar 45+2' | Report | Colindres 8'; Dorielton 10', 45+5'; Sushanto (yellow card) 32'; Emon 43'; Karim (yellow card) 71' (yellow-red card) 81' | Stadium: Comilla District Stadium; Referee: Bituraj Barua |

| 27 June 2022 17 | Dhaka Mohammedan | 3–1 | Sheikh Jamal DC | Comilla |
| 15:30 BST (UTC+6) | Morsalin 34' (yellow card) 74'; Diabate 38', 43', 83' (o.g.); Jasmin (yellow card) 65' | Report | Solomon (yellow card) 80' | Stadium: Comilla Stadium; Referee: Bituraj Barua |

| 2 July 2022 18 | Dhaka Mohammedan | 1–1 | Bashundhara Kings | Comilla |
| 15:30 BST (UTC+6) | Morsalin 11'; Ahsan Habib (yellow card) 90+3' | Report | Figueira 34'; Fahad (yellow card) 43'; Ibrahim (yellow card) 73'; Bishwanath (yellow card) 74'; Sumon (yellow card) 90' | Stadium: Comilla District Stadium; Referee: Md Alamgir Sarker |

| 15 July 2022 19 | Dhaka Mohammedan | 3–0 | Uttar Baridhara Club | Comilla |
| 16:00 BST (UTC+6) | Obi Moneke 45+3', 90+2'; Diabate 70' | Report | Papon (yellow card) 12' | Stadium: Comilla Stadium; Referee: Sabuj Das |

| 21 July 2022 20 | Muktijoddha Sangsad KC | 2–1 | Dhaka Mohammedan | Gopalganj |
| 16:00 BST (UTC+6) | Abdallah 26', 69' | Report | Jasmin (yellow card) 72'; Moneke 90' | Stadium: Sheikh Fazlul Haque Mani Stadium; Referee: Bituraj Barua |

| 27 July 2022 21 | Bangladesh Police FC | 1–1 | Dhaka Mohammedan | Rajshahi |
| 16:00 BST (UTC+6) | Kouakou 32'; Faisal (yellow card) 48'; Joyonto (yellow card) 83' | Report | Souleymane 28' | Stadium: Rajshahi District Stadium; Referee: Bhubon Mohon Tarafder |

| 2 August 2022 22 | Dhaka Mohammedan | 7–0 | Rahmatganj MFS | Comilla |
| 16:00 BST (UTC+6) | Asif 17'; Rajib (yellow card) 39'; Moneke 40'; Alamgir (yellow card) 49'; Souleymane 33', 67', 77', 79'; Sahed 90+4' | Report | Kiron (yellow card) 37'; Tareq (yellow card) 5' (yellow-red card) 51' | Stadium: Comilla District Stadium; Referee: Anisur Rahman |

== Statistics ==
=== Goalscorers ===
As of match played till 2 August 2022

| Rank | Player | Position | Total | BPL | Independence Cup | Federation Cup |
|---|---|---|---|---|---|---|
| 1 | (Mali) Souleymane Diabate | FW | 23 | 21 | 1 | 1 |
| 2 | (Nigeria) Ugochukwu Obi Moneke | MF | 5 | 5 | 0 | 0 |
| 3 | (Bangladesh) Sahed Hossain | MF | 4 | 3 | 1 | 0 |
| 4 | (Bangladesh) Jafar Iqbal | DF | 3 | 3 | 0 | 0 |
| 4 | (Bangladesh) Shahriar Emon | DF | 3 | 2 | 0 | 1 |
| 5 | (Bangladesh) Rajib Hossain | DF | 2 | 0 | 1 | 1 |
| 5 | (Bangladesh) Shekh Morsalin | MF | 2 | 2 | 0 | 0 |
| 6 | (Bangladesh) Saief Shamsud Nurat | FW | 1 | 0 | 1 | 0 |
| 6 | (Bangladesh) Forhad Hossain Mona | DF | 1 | 1 | 0 | 0 |
| 6 | (Bangladesh) Minhaj Abedin Ballu | MF | 1 | 0 | 1 | 0 |
| 6 | (Bangladesh) Ashraful Islam Ashik | MF | 1 | 1 | 0 | 0 |
| Own goal | | | 1 | 1 | 0 | 0 |
| Total | | | 47 | 40 | 4 | 3 |

Source: Matches
