= 2023–24 Sheikh Jamal Dhanmondi Club season =

Sheikh Jamal DC
2023–24 season
- Owner: Bashundhara Group
- President: Safwan Sobhan Tasvir
- Head coach: Marjan Sekulovski (until 30 January 2024); Francisco Bruto Da Costa (caretaker) (4 December 2023 – 14 January 2024); Saifur Rahman Moni (caretaker) (15 January 2024 – 30 January 2024); Zulfiker Mahmud Mintu (from 30 January 2024)
- Stadium: Sheikh Fazlul Haque Mani Stadium
- Bangladesh Premier League: 8th
- Federation Cup: Quarter-finals
- Independence Cup: Group stage
- Top goalscorer: League: Shokhrukhbek Kholmatov (4 goals); All: Higor Leite (5 goals)
- Biggest win: 4–0 v Brothers Union (Neutral); 30 October 2023 (Independence Cup)
- Biggest defeat: 0–3 v Bashundhara Kings (Home); 19 January 2024 (Premier League); 0–3 v Bangladesh Police (Neutral); 23 April 2024 (Federation Cup)

The 2023–24 season was Sheikh Jamal Dhanmondi Club's 62nd season since its establishment in 1962 and its 13th competitive season in the Bangladesh Premier League. In addition to the domestic league, Sheikh Jamal will participate in this season's edition of the Federation Cup and Independence Cup. The season covered the period from 1 August 2023 to 31 May 2024.

== Current squad ==
As of 24 March 2024

No.	Player	Nat.	Position(s)	Date Of Birth	Year Signed	Previous club
Goalkeepers
1	Ishaque Akonddo	(Bangladesh)	GK	15 July 2002 (aged 21)	2023	Fortis FC
22	Md Billal Hossain	(Bangladesh)	GK		2023	Shams Ul Huda FA
36	Hamidur Rahman Remon	(Bangladesh)	GK	20 October 1990 (aged 33)	2023	Abahani Limited Dhaka
99	Mahfuz Hasan Pritom	(Bangladesh)	GK	5 November 1999 (aged 23)	2023	Bashundhara Kings
Defenders
2	Monjurur Rahman Manik	(Bangladesh)	CB	9 May 1996 (aged 27)	2023	Bangladesh Police FC
3	Rajib Hossain	(Bangladesh)	CB	10 March 2005 (aged 18)	2023	Mohammedan SC
4	Mohamed Atikuzzaman	(Bangladesh)	RB/CB	10 October 1999 (aged 24)	2023	Bashundhara Kings
5	Tareq Miah	(Bangladesh)	CB/LB	22 February 2002 (aged 21)	2022	Muktijoddha Sangsad
15	Shakil Hossain	(Bangladesh)	CB/DM	6 July 2002 (aged 21)	2022	Swadhinata KS
16	Shakhzod Shaymanov	(Uzbekistan)	CB	2 April 1992 (aged 31)	2023	Free Agent
20	Md Taj Uddin	(Bangladesh)	RB/ RM	18 July 2002 (aged 21)	2023	Muktijoddha Sangsad
21	Shakil Ahmed	(Bangladesh)	RB	23 April 1994 (aged 29)	2019	Rahmatganj MFS
23	Joynal Abedin Dipu	(Bangladesh)	LB	12 December 2001 (aged 21)	2023	Fortis FC
24	Md Alfaj Mia	(Bangladesh)	RB		2023	Muktijoddha Sangsad
33	Md Sumon Ahmed	(Bangladesh)	CB	18 May 2002 (aged 21)	2023	Muktijoddha Sangsad
66	Mahamudul Hasan Kiron	(Bangladesh)	RB	1 September 2001 (aged 22)	2023	Bashundhara Kings
93	Shokhrukhbek Kholmatov	(Uzbekistan)	CB	16 March 1993 (aged 30)	2023	Bashundhara Kings
Midfielders
6	Abu Shaeid	(Bangladesh)	CM/AM	6 August 1999 (aged 24)	2022	Abahani Limited Dhaka
8	Mohammad Abdullah	(Bangladesh)	CM/AM	16 October 1997 (aged 26)	2023	Bangladesh Police FC
10	Higor Leite	(Brazil)	CM/AM	2 June 1993 (aged 30)	2023	(Brazil) Londrina Esporte Clube
12	Kaushik Barua	(Bangladesh)	DM/CM	4 October 1995 (aged 28)	2022	Chittagong Abahani Limited
13	Atiqur Rahman Fahad	(Bangladesh)	DM	15 September 1995 (aged 28)	2023	Bashundhara Kings
14	Akkas Ali	(Bangladesh)	DM	5 May 2004 (aged 19)	2023	Rahmatganj MFS
15	Shakhzod Shaymanov	(Uzbekistan)	DM	2 March 1992 (aged 31)	2023	Unattached
18	Jayed Ahmed	(Bangladesh)	DM/RB/RW	14 December 2002 (aged 20)	2023	AFC Uttara
27	Md Arifur Rahman Shemanto	(Bangladesh)	AM		2023	Uttara FC
44	Md Alamgir	(Bangladesh)	AM		2023	Shams Ul Huda FA
88	Md Afnan Ishraq	(Bangladesh)	AM		2023	
Forwards
11	Sazzad Hossain	(Bangladesh)	CM	18 January 1995 (aged 28)	2023	Mohammedan SC
17	Foysal Ahmed Fahim	(Bangladesh)	LW	24 February 2002 (aged 21)	2023	Abahani Limited Dhaka
19	Piash Ahmed Nova	(Bangladesh)	CF	25 September 2005 (aged 18)	2022	Bashundhara Kings
29	Abou Touré	(Senegal)	RW/CF	12 February 1996 (aged 27)	2024	(Malta) Gudja United
37	Mehedi Hasan Hridoy	(Bangladesh)	CF	2 August 2002 (aged 21)	2021	
50	Philip Adjah	(Ghana)	CF	25 June 1998 (aged 25)	2024	(Ethiopia) Sidama Coffee
55	Al Amin	(Bangladesh)	RW	29 March 2004 (aged 19)	2023	Shams Ul Huda FA
77	Fayed Azim Ifty	(Bangladesh)	FW		2023	
Left during the season
7	Stanley Dimgba	(Nigeria)	RW	29 March 1993 (aged 30)	2023	(Libya) Darnes SC
9	Bladimir Díaz	(Colombia)	CF	10 July 1992 (aged 31)	2023	(Israel) Sektzia Ness Ziona

== Friendlies ==
=== Pre-season ===
17 October 2023	Sheikh Jamal DC	1–1	Bangladesh Police FC	Dhaka
15:00 UTC+6		Report		Stadium: Bangladesh Police Football Ground

20 October 2023	Sheikh Russel KC	0–1	Sheikh Jamal DC	Dhaka
15:00 UTC+6		Report	Leite 65'	Stadium: Bashundhara Kings Practice Ground

=== Mid-season ===
16 November 2023	Sheikh Jamal DC	2–1	Sheikh Russel KC	Dhaka
15:00 UTC+6	Stanley 32'; Leite 43'	Report	Nipu 52'	Stadium: Sheikh Jamal Dhanmondi Club Limited field

19 November 2023	Sheikh Jamal DC	3–1	Chittagong Abahani	Dhaka
14:50 BST (UTC+6)	Raihan 57' (o.g.); Al Amin 64', 69'	Report	Sohel 54'	Stadium: Sheikh Jamal Dhanmondi Club Ground

26 November 2023	Fortis FC	1–4	Sheikh Jamal DC	Dhaka
14:30 BST (UTC+6)	Gryshyn 41'	Report	Sazzad 45'; Bladimir 48'; Stanley 59'; Al Amin 80'	Stadium: Fortis Training Ground

== Transfer ==
=== In ===
No.	Pos	Player	Previous club	Fee	Date	Source
23	DF	Joynal Abedin Dipu	Fortis FC	Free transfer	25 July 2023	
11	FW	Sazzad Hossain	Mohammedan SC	Free transfer	29 July 2023	
3	DF	Rajib Hossain	Mohammedan SC	Free transfer	30 July 2023	
66	DF	Mahamudul Hasan Kiron	Bashundhara Kings	Free transfer	1 September 2023	
13	MF	Atiqur Rahman Fahad	Bashundhara Kings	Free transfer	1 September 2023	
17	FW	Foysal Ahmed Fahim	Abahani Limited Dhaka	Free transfer	1 September 2023	
93	DF	(Uzbekistan) Shokhrukhbek Kholmatov	Bashundhara Kings	Free transfer	1 September 2023	
16	MF	(Uzbekistan) Shakhzod Shaymanov	Unattached	Free transfer	1 September 2023	
7	FW	(Nigeria) Stanley Dimgba	(Libya) Darnes SC	Free transfer	11 September 2023	
10	MF	(Brazil) Higor Leite	(Brazil) Londrina Esporte Clube	Free transfer	11 September 2023	
19	MF	Mohammad Abdullah	Bangladesh Police FC	Free transfer	15 September 2023	
36	GK	Hamidur Rahman Remon	Bashundhara Kings	Free transfer	1 October 2023	
33	DF	Sumon Ahmed	Muktijoddha Sangsad	Free transfer	1 October 2023	
20	DF	Md Taj Uddin	Muktijoddha Sangsad	Free transfer	1 October 2023	
24	DF	Md Alfaj Mia	Muktijoddha Sangsad	Free transfer	1 October 2023	
22	GK	Md Billal Hossain	Shams Ul Huda Football Academy	Free transfer	1 October 2023	
2	DF	Monjurur Rahman Manik	Bangladesh Police FC	Free transfer	1 October 2023	
4	DF	Mohamed Atikuzzaman	Bashundhara Kings	Free transfer	1 October 2023	
18	DF	Jayed Ahmed	AFC Uttara	Free transfer	1 October 2023	
18	MF	Md Alamgir	Shams Ul Huda Football Academy	Free transfer	1 October 2023	
28	FW	Al Amin	Shams Ul Huda Football Academy	Free transfer	1 October 2023	
27	MF	Arifur Rahman Shemanto	Uttara FC	Free transfer	1 October 2023	
14	MF	Akkas Ali	Rahmatganj MFS	Free transfer	1 October 2023	
77	FW	Fayed Azim Ifty	Unattached	Free transfer	1 October 2023	
88	FW	Afnan Ishraq	Unattached	Free transfer	1 October 2023	
9	FW	(Colombia) Bladimir Díaz	(Israel) Sektzia Ness Ziona	Free transfer	1 October 2023	
99	GK	Mahfuz Hasan Pritom	Abahani Limited Dhaka	Free transfer	10 October 2023	
50	FW	(Ghana) Philip Adjah	(Ethiopia) Sidama Coffee	Free transfer	20 March 2024	
29	FW	(Senegal) Abou Touré	(Malta) Gudja United	Free transfer	20 March 2024	

=== Out ===
No.	Pos	Player	Moved to	Fee	Date	Source
6	DF	(Paraguay) Jorge Aguilar	(Venezuela) Estudiantes de Mérida	Free transfer	7 July 2023	
10	FW	Obidur Rahman Nawbab	Lusail SC	Free transfer	1 August 2023	
4	DF	Yeamin Munna	Unattached	Released	1 August 2023	
29	DF	Nasirul Islam Nasir	Unattached	Released	1 August 2023	
2	DF	Raihan Hasan	Unattached	Released	1 September 2023	
20	FW	Nurul Absar	Unattached	Released	1 September 2023	
70	MF	(Uzbekistan) Nodir Mavlonov	Unattached	Released	1 September 2023	
9	FW	(Saint Vincent and the Grenadines) Cornelius Stewart	Abahani Limited Dhaka	Free transfer	1 September 2023	
30	GK	Md Nayem	Rahmatganj MFS	Free transfer	7 September 2023	
18	MF	Omar Faruk Babu	Mohammedan SC	Free transfer	13 September 2023	
32	DF	Mohammad Emon	Bangladesh Police FC	Free transfer	1 October 2023	
25	DF	Md Khalil Bhuyia	Unattached	Released	1 October 2023	
8	FW	(Uzbekistan) Otabek Valizhonov	Brothers Union	Free transfer	October 2023	
31	DF	Rifat Hasan Sarthok	Chittagong Abahani Limited	Free transfer	October 2023	
27	DF	Rashedul Alam Moni	Chittagong Abahani Limited	Free transfer	October 2023	
19	MF	Sohanur Rahman	Chittagong Abahani Limited	Free transfer	October 2023	
17	MF	Faysal Ahmed	Chittagong Abahani Limited	Free transfer	October 2023	
14	FW	Mannaf Rabby	Chittagong Abahani Limited	Free transfer	October 2023	
7	FW	(Nigeria) Stanley Dimgba	Unattached	Released	March 2024	
9	FW	(Colombia) Bladimir Díaz	Unattached	Released	March 2024	

== Competitions ==
Win Draw Loss Fixtures

=== Overall ===
Competition	First match	Last match	Final Position
BPL	23 December 2023	29 May 2024	8th
Federation Cup	30 October 2023	23 April 2024	Quarter-final
Independence Cup	30 October 2023	3 December 2023	Group stage

=== Overview ===
Competition	Record							
Competition	Pld	W	D	L	GF	GA	GD	Win %
BPL	18	4	5	9	14	24	−10	22.22
Federation Cup	3	1	1	1	6	6	+0	33.33
Independence Cup	3	1	1	1	5	2	+3	33.33
Total	24	6	7	11	25	32	−7	25.00

Source: Soccerway

=== Premier League ===
==== League table ====
Pos	Team	Pld	W	D	L	GF	GA	GD	Pts
6	Sheikh Russel KC	18	4	7	7	20	24	−4	19
7	Chittagong Abahani	18	4	7	7	22	29	−7	19
8	Sheikh Jamal DC	18	4	5	9	14	24	−10	17
9	Rahmatganj MFS	18	2	10	6	19	26	−7	16
10	Brothers Union	18	1	4	13	21	66	−45	7

Source: Soccerway
Rules for classification: 1) Points; 2) Goal difference; 3) Goals scored.

==== Results summary ====
Overall								Home						Away					
Pld	W	D	L	GF	GA	GD	Pts	W	D	L	GF	GA	GD	W	D	L	GF	GA	GD
18	4	5	9	14	24	−10	17	2	2	5	9	16	−7	2	3	4	5	8	−3

Source: Soccerway

==== Results by round ====
Round	1	2	3	4	5	6	7	8	9	10	11	12	13	14	15	16	17	18
Ground	A	A	H	H	A	H	H	A	H	H	H	A	A	H	A	A	H	H
Result	L	W	L	L	W	L	W	D	W	D	D	L	L	L	D	D	L	L
Position	8	5	7	8	5	9	5	5	4	4	4	5	7	7	7	7	8	8

Source: Matches
A = Away; H = Home; W = Win; D = Draw; L = Loss; P = Postponed

=== Matches ===
23 December 2023 1	Sheikh Russel KC	2–1	Sheikh Jamal DC	Dhaka
14:30 BST (UTC+6)	Ndikumana 5'; Kodai (yellow card) 33'; Tanvir (yellow card) 45'; Chandon (yellow card) 46'; Ganiu 49'; Nipu (yellow card) 56'; Dipok (yellow card) 90+1'	Report	Leite (yellow card) 33'; Kholmatov 59'; Kiron (red card) 45+3'	Stadium: Bashundhara Kings Arena; Referee: Saymon Hasan

30 December 2023 2	Bangladesh Police	0–1	Sheikh Jamal DC	Mymensingh
14:30 BST (UTC+6)	García (yellow card) 52'; Morillo (yellow card) 85'	Report	Kholmatov (yellow card) 44'; Faysal 55' (o.g.); Akkas (yellow card) 85'	Stadium: Rafiq Uddin Bhuiyan Stadium; Referee: Bituraj Barua

12 January 2024 3	Sheikh Jamal DC	0–1	Dhaka Abahani	Gopalganj
14:45 BST (UTC+6)	Dipu (yellow card) 34'; Shaymanov (yellow card) 51'; Leite (yellow card) 69'	Report	Rafi (red card) 38'; Cornelius 88'	Stadium: Sheikh Fazlul Haque Mani Stadium; Referee: Md Mizanur Rahman

19 January 2024 4	Sheikh Jamal DC	0–3	Bashundhara Kings	Gopalganj
14:45 BST (UTC+6)	Shaeid (yellow card) 15'; Sazzad (yellow card) 55'; Priton (yellow card) 73'; Leite (yellow card) 77'; Shaymanov (yellow card) 82'	Report	Saad (yellow card) 11'; Zoni (yellow card) 46'; Rakib (yellow card) 44'; Sohel (yellow card) 75'; Dori 79', 90+2' (yellow card) 90+2'; Srabon (yellow card) 84'; Robinho 90+7'	Stadium: Sheikh Fazlul Haque Mani Stadium; Referee: Symoon Hasan Sany

26 January 2024 5	Brothers Union	0–2	Sheikh Jamal DC	Rajshahi
14:45 BST (UTC+6)	Shoybur (yellow card) 38'; Otabek (yellow card) 39'; Ranu (yellow card) 89'; Noyon (yellow card) 67'	Report	Shaeid (yellow card) 20'; Kaushik (yellow card) 28'; Sazzad 73', 90+3'; Fahim (yellow card) 90+5'	Stadium: Muktijuddho Sriti Stadium; Referee: Mahmud Zamal Farouquee Nahid

3 February 2024 6	Sheikh Jamal DC	0–2	Chittagong Abahani	Gopalganj
15:00 BST (UTC+6)	Kholmatov (yellow card) 88'	Report	Rabby (yellow card) 40' (goal) 52'; Ifegwu (yellow card) 88' (goal) 90+1'	Stadium: Sheikh Fazlul Haque Mani Stadium; Referee: Md Jalal Uddin

10 February 2024 7	Sheikh Jamal DC	1–0	Fortis FC	Gopalganj
15:00 BST (UTC+6)	Kholmatov (yellow card) 49'; Sazzad (yellow card) 59'; Fahim 63'; Fahad (yellow card) 83' (yellow-red card) 90+3'	Report	Rashed (yellow card) 41'; Farhad (yellow card) 48'; Babou (yellow card) 83'	Stadium: Sheikh Fazlul Haque Mani Stadium; Referee: Md Mizanur Rahman

17 February 2024 8	Mohammedan SC	0–0	Sheikh Jamal DC	Mymensingh
15:00 BST (UTC+6)	Sunday (yellow card) 45+2'	Report	Kaushik (yellow card) 39'; Jayed (yellow card) 45'; Rajib (yellow card) 83'; Pritom (yellow card) 90+3'	Stadium: Rafiq Uddin Bhuiyan Stadium; Referee: Symoon Hasan Sanny

23 February 2024 9	Sheikh Jamal DC	2–1	Rahmatganj MFS	Gopalganj
15:00 BST (UTC+6)	Sazzad (yellow card) 32'; Higor 40'; Kholmatov 64' (yellow card) 90+3'; Al Amin (yellow card) 88'; Akkas (yellow card) 90+3'	Report	Konney 20'; Anik (yellow card) 45+1'; Sushanto (yellow card) 73'; Tashpulatov (yellow card) 90+2'; Ceesay (yellow card) 90+4'	Stadium: Sheikh Fazlul Haque Mani Stadium; Referee: Md Anisur Rahman Sagor

29 March 2024 10	Sheikh Jamal DC	1–1	Sheikh Russel KC	Gopalganj
15:15 BST (UTC+6)	Kholmatov 64' (pen.); Shaymanov (yellow card) 77'; Kaushik (yellow card) 86'	Report	Sylla 22'	Stadium: Sheikh Fazlul Haque Mani Stadium; Referee: Md Jalal Uddin

6 April 2024 11	Sheikh Jamal DC	2–2	Bangladesh Police	Gopalganj
15:15 BST (UTC+6)	Kholmatov (yellow card) 38'; Touré 44', 60'	Report	Morillo 11'; Palacios (yellow card) 50'; Al Amin 75'	Stadium: Sheikh Fazlul Haque Mani Stadium; Referee: Mizanur Rahman

19 April 2024 12	Dhaka Abahani	2–1	Sheikh Jamal DC	Gopalganj
15:45 BST (UTC+6)	Fernandes 28' (yellow card) 90+5'; Masud Rana (yellow card) 35'; Cornelius 45+1'; Ridoy (yellow card) 72'	Report	Abdullah 8'; Kholmatov (yellow card) 68'; Leite (yellow card) 86'; Taj (yellow card) 89'; Shaymanov (yellow card) 90+3'	Stadium: Sheikh Fazlul Haque Mani Stadium; Referee: Bituraj Barua

27 April 2024 13	Bashundhara Kings	2–0	Sheikh Jamal DC	Dhaka
17:45 BST (UTC+6)	Topu (yellow card) 45'; Dorielton 18', 45+3'; Saad (yellow card) 81'	Report	Touré (yellow card) 15'; Shaeid (yellow card) 33'; Kiron (yellow card) 67'	Stadium: Bashundhara Kings Arena; Referee: Anisur Rahman

3 May 2024 14	Sheikh Jamal DC	2–3	Brothers Union	Gopalganj
16:00 BST (UTC+6)	Higor 72' (pen.); Shakhzod 75'	Report	Touray (yellow card) 24'; Eleta 45'; Ananto (yellow card) 50'; Mbye (yellow card) 54'; Mohsin 84'; Mavlyanov (yellow card) 87'; Rahul 89'; Mirajul (yellow card) 90+2'	Stadium: Sheikh Fazlul Haque Mani Stadium; Referee: Taposh Roy

11 May 2024 15	Chittagong Abahani	0–0	Sheikh Jamal DC	Munshigonj
16:00 BST (UTC+6)	Sakib (yellow card) 74'	Report	Kholmatov (yellow card) 35'; Rajib (yellow card) 51'	Stadium: Bir Sreshtho Fl. Lt. Matiur Rahman Stadium; Referee: Mahmud Zamal Farouquee Nahid

18 May 2024 16	Fortis FC	0–0	Sheikh Jamal DC	Rajshahi
16:00 BST (UTC+6)	Farhad (yellow card) 40'; Bappy (yellow card) 90+6'	Report	Shakil (yellow card) 44'; Fahad (yellow card) 76'	Stadium: Muktijuddho Sriti Stadium; Referee: MZF Nahid

25 May 2024 17	Sheikh Jamal DC	1–3	Mohammedan SC	Gopalganj
16:00 BST (UTC+6)	Kholmatov 90+4' (pen.); Shaymanov (yellow card) 81'	Report	Diabate 36', 90'; Sunday 53'; Kalin (yellow card) 90+2'	Stadium: Sheikh Fazlul Haque Mani Stadium; Referee: Md Jalal Uddin

29 May 2024 18	Rahmatganj MFS	2–0	Sheikh Jamal DC	Munshigonj
16:00 BST (UTC+6)	Shakil (yellow card) 11'; Boateng 50'; Konney 71' (pen.)	Report	Shakil (red card) 68'; Pritom (yellow card) 68'; Kholmatov (yellow card) 90'	Stadium: Shaheed Bir Sreshtho Flight Lieutenant Matiur Rahman Stadium; Referee: Kasun Lakmal

=== Independence Cup ===
==== Group A ====
Pos	Team	Pld	W	D	L	GF	GA	GD	Pts	Qualification
1	Bangladesh Police FC	2	2	0	0	3	0	+3	6	Advance to Knockout stage
2	Sheikh Jamal DC	2	1	0	1	4	1	+3	3	Advance to Knockout stage
3	Brothers Union	2	0	0	2	0	6	−6	0	

Source: GSA
Rules for classification: Group stage tiebreakers

30 October 2023 1	Brothers Union	0–4	Sheikh Jamal DC	Dhaka
14:30 BST (UTC+6)	Sabuj (yellow card) 34'; Rabby (yellow card) 85'	Report	Leite 11', 36'; Díaz 59'; Sazzad 73'	Stadium: Bashundhara Kings Arena; Referee: Md Alamgir Sarker

2 November 2023 2	Sheikh Jamal DC	0–1	Bangladesh Police FC	Dhaka
14:30 BST (UTC+6)		Report	Karipov 26'	Stadium: Bashundhara Kings Arena; Referee: Md Jalal Uddin

==== Knockout stages ====
3 December 2023 Quarter-finals	Dhaka Abahani	1–1 (a.e.t.) (3–2 p)	Sheikh Jamal DC	Dhaka
18:30 BST (UTC+6)	Rafi (yellow card) 24'; Rahim (yellow card) 43'; Milad Sheykh (yellow card) 64'; Masud Rana (yellow card) 107'; Fernandes 94'	Report	Fahad (yellow card) 16'; Fahim (yellow card) 30'; Kholmatov (yellow card) 36'; Leite 107'	Stadium: Bashundhara Kings Arena; Referee: Bituraj Barua
	Penalties
	Fernandes (penalty scored); Emeka (penalty missed); Washington (penalty scored); Rabiul (penalty missed); Milad Sheykh (penalty scored)		Leite (penalty scored); Kholmatov (penalty missed); Shakil (penalty missed); Rajib (penalty scored); Fahim (penalty missed)

=== Federation Cup ===
Pos	Team	Pld	W	D	L	GF	GA	GD	Pts	Qualification
1	Sheikh Jamal DC	2	1	1	0	6	3	+3	4	Advance to Knockout stage
2	Bangladesh Police FC	2	0	2	0	4	4	0	2	Advance to Knockout stage
3	Rahmatganj MFS	2	0	1	1	3	6	−3	1	Qualified as a best third place team to Knockout stage

Source: Soccerway
Rules for classification: Group stages tiebreakers

23 January 2024 1	Rahmatganj MFS	1–4	Sheikh Jamal DC	Dhaka
14:45 BST (UTC+6)	Rasel (yellow card) 61'; Sagor (yellow card) 65'; Ceesay 90+2' (pen.)	Report	Dimgba 19'; Fahim 31', 90+4'; Sazzad 86'	Stadium: Bashundhara Kings Arena; Referee: Bituraj Barua

6 February 2024 2	Sheikh Jamal DC	2–2	Bangladesh Police	Gopalganj
15:00 BST (UTC+6)	Abdullah 23' (yellow card) 45+3'; Dimgba 39' (pen.)	Report	García 25'; Kirmane 31'	Stadium: Sheikh Fazlul Haque Mani Stadium; Referee: Md Nasir Uddin

==== Knockout stages ====
===== Quarter-final =====
23 April 2024 Quarter-finals	Sheikh Jamal DC	0–3	Bangladesh Police	Gopalganj
15:00 BST (UTC+6)	Fahad (yellow card) 14'; Touré (yellow card) 45+4'	Report	Sokhibov 2'; Kirmane 8'; Abdullaev 23'; Ismail (yellow card) 28'	Stadium: Sheikh Fazlul Haque Mani Stadium; Referee: Md Jalal Uddin

== Statistics ==
=== Goalscorers ===
Rank	No.	Pos.	Nat.	Player	BPL	Federation Cup	Independence Cup	Total
1	10	MF	(Brazil)	Higor Leite	2	0	3	5
2	11	FW	(Bangladesh)	Sazzad Hossain	2	1	1	4
2	93	DF	(Uzbekistan)	Shokhrukhbek Kholmatov	4	0	0	4
4	17	FW	(Bangladesh)	Foysal Ahmed Fahim	1	2	0	3
5	7	FW	(Nigeria)	Stanley Dimgba	0	2	0	2
5	8	MF	(Bangladesh)	Mohammad Abdullah	1	1	0	2
5	29	FW	(Senegal)	Abou Touré	2	0	0	2
8	9	FW	(Colombia)	Bladimir Díaz	0	0	1	1
8	16	MF	(Uzbekistan)	Shakhzod Shaymanov	1	0	0	1
Own goal					1	0	0	1
Total					14	6	5	25

Source: Soccerway

=== Assists ===
Rank	No.	Pos.	Nat.	Player	BPL	Federation Cup	Independence Cup	Total
1	23	DF	(Bangladesh)	Joynal Abedin Dipu	0	2	1	3
2	17	FW	(Bangladesh)	Foysal Ahmed Fahim	2	0	0	2
2	21	DF	(Bangladesh)	Shakil Ahmed	0	2	0	2
2	13	MF	(Bangladesh)	Atiqur Rahman Fahad	2	0	0	2
2	55	FW	(Bangladesh)	Al Amin	2	0	0	2
6	7	FW	(Nigeria)	Stanley Dimgba	0	0	1	1
6	10	MF	(Brazil)	Higor Leite	0	0	1	1
6	16	MF	(Uzbekistan)	Shakhzod Shaymanov	1	0	0	1
6	2	DF	(Bangladesh)	Monjurur Rahman Manik	0	1	0	1
6	29	FW	(Senegal)	Abou Touré	1	0	0	1
6	8	MF	(Bangladesh)	Mohammad Abdullah	1	0	0	1
Total					9	5	3	17

Source: Soccerway
