= Mahamudul Hasan Kiron =

Bangladeshi footballer (born 2001)

Personal information
- Full name: Mohamed Mahamudul Hasan Kiron
- Date of birth: 1 September 2001 (age 25)
- Place of birth: Sherpur, Bangladesh
- Height: 1.73 m (5 ft 8 in)
- Position: Right-back

Team information
- Current team: Arambagh
- Number: 5

Youth career
- 2010–2019: BKSP

Senior career*
Years	Team	Apps	(Gls)
2017–2019	Arambagh	33	(0)
2019–2022	Rahmatganj	51	(1)
2022–2023	Bashundhara Kings	6	(0)
2023–2024	Sheikh Jamal	12	(0)
2024–2026	Rahmatganj	16	(0)
2026–	Arambagh	5	(0)

International career
2017	Bangladesh U20	2	(0)
2023	Bangladesh U23	1	(0)
Medal record
Representing Bangladesh
SAFF U-18 Championship
Runner-up	2017 Bhutan	Team
- * Club domestic league appearances and goals as of 24 October 2026

Mahamudul Hasan Kiron (Bengali: মাহামুদুল হাসান কিরণ; born 1 September 2001) is a Bangladeshi professional footballer who plays as a right-back for Arambagh KS in the Bangladesh Football League.

== Early career ==
Mahamudul Hasan Kiron was born on 1 September 2001 in Sherpur District. In 2010, Kiron gained admission to Bangladesh Krira Shikkha Protishtan (BKSP) after returning from participating in a youth football tournament in Iran. In 2012, Kiron was one of twelve under-16 players selected for advanced training with the Manchester United Academy. In 2016, Kiron made his professional league debut with Agrani Bank Ltd. SC during the 2016 Bangladesh Championship League. He was admitted to Jahangirnagar University in 2019.

== Club career ==
=== Arambagh KS ===
In 2017, Kiron joined Arambagh KS in the Bangladesh Premier League after impressing the club's coach, Maruful Haque. He made his competitive debut for the club on 18 January 2018 against Saif Sporting Club during a goalless draw in the 2017–18 Independence Cup. He played all 5 games as Arambagh became the surprise champions of the tournament and later went on to establish himself as the club's starting right-back.

=== Rahmatganj MFS ===
In 2019, Kiron joined Old Dhaka club Rahmatganj MFS. On December 12, 2019, Kiron made his competitive debut for the club during a goalless draw with Saif Sporting Club in the 2019 Federation Cup. On August 13, 2021, Kiron scored his first professional goal in a 2–0 victory over Chittagong Abahani. Kiron's second season at the club saw him become one of the best-performing full-backs in the league and a fan favorite. He was named the club's captain for the 2021–22 season and led them to the 2021 Federation Cup final, which they eventually lost 1–2 to Dhaka Abahani.

=== Bashundhara Kings ===
In 2022, Kiron joined Bashundhara Kings. Kiron missed the first half of the season due to an injury; nonetheless, he was part of a failed transfer abroad, as his rumored move to the Torneo Federal A club Sol de Mayo did not come to fruition. On 4 April 2023, Kiron made his competitive debut for the club against Muktijoddha Sangsad KC in the 2022–23 Federation Cup. Kiron appeared six times in the league as his club won the Premier League title for a record fourth time in a row. He was also won the Best Player Award while representing Jahangirnagar University, during the Prothom Alo inter-university tournament.

=== Sheikh Jamal Dhanmondi Club ===
In 2023, Kiron moved to Sheikh Jamal Dhanmondi Club after failing to secure a place in the starting eleven of Bashundhara Kings.

== International career ==
In 2017, Kiron represented the Bangladesh U19 team during the 2017 SAFF U-18 Championship.

In 2023, he represented the Bangladesh U23 team during the 2024 AFC U-23 Asian Cup qualification.

== Career statistics ==
=== Club ===
As of 8 April 2023.

Appearances and goals by club, season and competition
Club	Season	League			Domestic Cup (Note: Appearance(s) in Bangladesh Federation Cup)		Other (Note: Appearance(s) in Bangladesh Independence Cup)		Continental		Total	
Club	Season	Division	Apps	Goals	Apps	Goals	Apps	Goals	Apps	Goals	Apps	Goals
Arambagh KS	2017–18	Bangladesh Premier League	21	0	0	0	5	0	—		26	0
Arambagh KS	2018–19	Bangladesh Premier League	12	0	2	0	0	0	—		14	0
Arambagh KS	Arambagh KS total		33	0	2	0	5	0	0	0	40	0
Rahmatganj MFS	2019–20	Bangladesh Premier League	6	0	5	0	—		—		11	0
Rahmatganj MFS	2020–21	Bangladesh Premier League	23	1	2	0	—		—		25	1
Rahmatganj MFS	2021–22	Bangladesh Premier League	22	0	4	0	2	0	—		28	0
Rahmatganj MFS	Rahmatganj MFS total		51	1	11	0	2	0	0	0	64	1
Bashundhara Kings	2022–23	Bangladesh Premier League	6	0	2	0	0	0	—		8	0
Sheikh Jamal DC	2023–24	Bangladesh Premier League	0	0	0	0	0	0	—		0	0
Career total			90	1	15	0	7	0	0	0	112	1

== Honours ==
Arambagh KS

- Independence Cup: 2017–18
