= 2021 Independence Cup (Bangladesh) =

10th season of the Independence Cup (Bangladesh)

2021–22 Independence Cup

Tournament details
- Host country: Bangladesh
- City: Dhaka
- Dates: 27 November–18 December 2021
- Teams: 15
- Venue: 1 (in 1 host city)

Final positions
- Champions: Dhaka Abahani (2nd title)
- Runners-up: Bashundhara Kings

Tournament statistics
- Matches played: 28
- Goals scored: 75 (2.68 per match)
- Top scorer(s): (Brazil) Dorielton (Dhaka Abahani) (4 goals)
- Best player(s): (Brazil) Raphael Augusto (Dhaka Abahani)
- Fair play award: Saif Sporting Club

The 2021 Independence Cup is also known as the Riviera Independence Cup 2021 due to sponsorship from Riviera. It was the 12th edition of the Independence Cup, the main domestic annual top-tier club football tournament organized by the Bangladesh Football Federation (BFF). Fifteen participants competed in this edition of the tournament.

Dhaka Abahani is the defending champion, having defeated the Bashundhara Kings 3–0 in the final of the tournament.

== Participating teams ==
The following fifteen teams were contested in the tournament.

Team	Appearances	Previous best performance
Bangladesh Police FC	Debut	n/a
Bashundhara Kings	2nd	Champions (2018)
Chittagong Abahani	11th	Champions (2016)
Dhaka Abahani	11th	Champions (1990)
Dhaka Mohammedan	11th	Champions (1972, 1991, 2014)
Muktijoddha Sangsad KC	11th	Champions (2005)
Rahmatganj MFS	11th	Semi-finals (2017-18)
Sheikh Russel KC	7th	Champions (2013)
Sheikh Jamal DC	7th	Runners-up (2012–13)
Saif Sporting Club	3rd	Quarter-finals (2018)
Swadhinata KS	Debut	n/a
Uttar Baridhara Club	2nd	Group-stage (2016)
Bangladesh Air Force (Invited)	Debut	n/a
Bangladesh Army (Invited)	2nd	Quarter-final (1991)
Bangladesh Navy (Invited)	Debut	n/a

== Venue ==
All matches were held at BSSS Mostafa Kamal Stadium in Dhaka, Bangladesh.

Dhaka	Dhaka is located in Bangladesh
BSSS Mostafa Kamal Stadium	Dhaka is located in Bangladesh
Capacity: 25,000	Dhaka is located in Bangladesh

== Draw ==
The draw ceremony of the tournament was held on 23 November 2021 at 15:00 on the 3rd floor of BFF House, Motijheel, Dhaka, Bangladesh. The fifteen teams were divided into four groups. The top two teams from each group go through the knockout stage.

== Group summary ==
Group A	Group B	Group C	Group D
Dhaka Abahani	Sheikh Jamal DC	Saif Sporting Club	Bashundhara Kings
Rahmatganj MFS	Sheikh Russel KC	Muktijoddha Sangsad KC	Chittagong Abahani
Swadhinata KS	Uttar Baridhara SC	Dhaka Mohammedan	Bangladesh Police FC
	Bangladesh Air Force	Bangladesh Army	Bangladesh Navy

== Round and dates ==
Dates/Year	Round	Match dates
27 November 2021 – 18 December 2021	Group stages	27 November–8 December 2021
27 November 2021 – 18 December 2021	Quarter-finals	10–12 December 2021
27 November 2021 – 18 December 2021	Semi-finals	14 December 2021
27 November 2021 – 18 December 2021	Final	18 December 2021

== Match officials ==
Referees

- (Bangladesh) Bitura Barua
- (Bangladesh) Md Saymoon Hasan Sany
- (Bangladesh) Md Jalaluddin
- (Bangladesh) Md Anisur Rahman Sagor
- (Bangladesh) Md Jasim Akter
- (Bangladesh) Md Mizanur Rahman
- (Bangladesh) Md Alamgir Sarkar
- (Bangladesh) Md Shorab Hossain
- (Bangladesh) GM Chowdhury Nayan
- (Bangladesh) Mahmud Zamil Farouqee Nahid

Assistant referees

- (Bangladesh) Md Shah Alam
- (Bangladesh) Sujoy Borua
- (Bangladesh) Md Nuruzzaman
- (Bangladesh) Junayed Sharif
- (Bangladesh) Md Monir Dhali
- (Bangladesh) Md Mahmudul Hasan Mamun
- (Bangladesh) Sharifuzzaman Tipu
- (Bangladesh) Mehedi Hasan Emon
- (Bangladesh) Md Rasel Mia
- (Bangladesh) Bayezid Mondol
- (Bangladesh) Sheikh Iqbal Alam
- (Bangladesh) Md Khorshed Islam
- (Bangladesh) Sheikh Farid

== Group stages ==
Key to colours in group tables
Group winners and runners-up advance to the Knockout-stage

Tiebreakers

Teams were ranked according to points (3 points for a win, 1 point for a draw, 0 points for a loss), and if tied on points, the following tie-breaking criteria were applied, in the order given, to determine the rankings.

1. Points in head-to-head matches among tied teams;
2. Goal difference in head-to-head matches among tied teams;
3. Goals scored in head-to-head matches among tied teams;
4. If more than two teams are tied, and after applying all head-to-head criteria above, a subset of teams are still tied, all head-to-head criteria above are reapplied exclusively to this subset of teams;
5. Goal difference in all group matches;
6. Goals scored in all group matches;
7. Penalty shoot-out if only two teams were tied and they met in the last round of the group;
8. Disciplinary points (yellow card = 1 point, red card as a result of two yellow cards = 3 points, direct red card = 3 points, yellow card followed by direct red card = 4 points);
9. Drawing of lots.

=== Group A ===
Pos	Team	Pld	W	D	L	GF	GA	GD	Pts	Status
1	Dhaka Abahani	2	2	0	0	5	2	+3	6	Qualified for Knockout stage
2	Swadhinata KS	2	1	0	1	4	4	0	3	Qualified for Knockout stage
3	Rahmatganj MFS	2	0	0	2	3	6	−3	0	

Source: Global Sports Archive
Rules for classification: Group stage tiebreakers
29 November 2021
17:45

Swadhinata KS	1–2	Dhaka Abahani
Nodir 91'	Report	Royal 29'; Raphael 74'

BSSS Mostafa Kamal Stadium, Dhaka
Referee: Jasim Akter

3 December 2021
17:45

Rahmatganj MFS	2–3	Swadhinata KS
Philip 3'; Sanowar 25'	Report	Rafal 16'; Nedo 50'; Al-Amin 72' (o.g.)

BSSS Mostafa Kamal Stadium, Dhaka
Referee: Md Alamgir Sarkar

7 December 2021
17:45

Dhaka Abahani	3–1	Rahmatganj MFS
Dorielton (17 (pen.)), 50'; Raphael 70' (pen.)	Report	Tutul 14' (o.g.)

BSSS Mostafa Kamal Stadium, Dhaka
Referee: Bituraj Barua

=== Group B ===
Pos	Team	Pld	W	D	L	GF	GA	GD	Pts	Status
1	Sheikh Russel KC	3	2	1	0	4	1	+3	7	Qualified for Knockout stage
2	Sheikh Jamal DC	3	1	2	0	4	1	+3	5	Qualified for Knockout stage
3	Uttar Baridhara Club	3	0	2	1	1	2	−1	2	
4	Bangladesh Air Force	3	0	1	2	1	6	−5	1	

Source: Global Sports Archive
Rules for classification: Group stage tiebreakers
27 November 2021
15:30

Sheikh Russel KC	1–0	Uttar Baridhara Club
Mannaf 58'	Report

BSSS Mostafa Kamal Stadium, Dhaka
Referee: Bituraj Barua
27 November 2021
18:00

Sheikh Jamal DC	3–0	Bangladesh Air Force
Otabek 16'; Solomon 52'; Sohanur 54'	Report

BSSS Mostafa Kamal Stadium, Dhaka
Referee: Md Saymon Hasan Sany

1 December 2021
18:00

Uttar Baridhara Club	0–0	Sheikh Jamal DC
	Report

BSSS Mostafa Kamal Stadium, Dhaka
Referee: GM Chowdhury Nayon
1 December 2021
20:00

Bangladesh Air Force	0–2	Sheikh Russel KC
	Report	Ailton 8', 25'

BSSS Mostafa Kamal Stadium, Dhaka
Referee: Md Shorab Hossain

5 December 2021
16:00

Uttar Baridhara Club	1–1	Bangladesh Air Force
Kochnev 82' (pen.)	Report	Juwel 49'

BSSS Mostafa Kamal Stadium, Dhaka
Referee: Md Shorab Hossain
5 December 2021
18:00

Sheikh Jamal DC	1–1	Sheikh Russel KC
Shahin 26'	Report	Esmaël 28'

BSSS Mostafa Kamal Stadium, Dhaka
Referee: Md Saymoon Hasan Sany

=== Group C ===
Pos	Team	Pld	W	D	L	GF	GA	GD	Pts	Status
1	Saif Sporting Club	3	2	1	0	6	4	+2	7	Qualified for Knockout stage
2	Bangladesh Army	3	1	1	1	4	4	0	4	Qualified for Knockout stage
3	Dhaka Mohammedan	3	1	1	1	4	4	0	4	
4	Muktijoddha Sangsad KC	3	0	1	2	4	6	−2	1	

Source: Global Sports Archive
Rules for classification: Group stage tiebreakers
28 November 2021
16:00

Mohammedan SC	2–1	Muktijoddha Sangsad KC
Diabate 36'; Sahed 50'	Report	Tetsuaki 70'

BSSS Mostafa Kamal Stadium, Dhaka
Referee: Md Jalaluddin
28 November 2021
18:00

Saif Sporting Club	2–1	Bangladesh Army
Emeka 49' (pen.); Mithu 80' (o.g.)	Report	Mithu 43' (pen.)

BSSS Mostafa Kamal Stadium, Dhaka
Referee: Md Anisur Rahman

2 December 2021
16:00

Muktijoddha Sangsad KC	2–3	Saif Sporting Club
Tetsuaki 85', 90'	Report	Fahim 17'; Nasirul 40'; Sazzad 81'

BSSS Mostafa Kamal Stadium, Dhaka
Referee: Md Mizanur Rahman
2 December 2021
18:00

Bangladesh Army	2–1	Mohammedan SC
Ranju 18'; Emon 69'	Report	Minhajul 90+5'

BSSS Mostafa Kamal Stadium, Dhaka
Referee: Bituraj Barua

6 December 2021
16:00

Muktijoddha Sangsad KC	1–1	Bangladesh Army
Shamsaldin 8'	Report	Shamimul 87'

BSSS Mostafa Kamal Stadium, Dhaka
Referee: Md Mizanur Rahman
6 December 2021
18:00

Saif Sporting Club	1–1	Mohammedan SC
Udoh 45'	Report	Rajib 90+1'

BSSS Mostafa Kamal Stadium, Dhaka
Referee: GM Chowdhury Nayon

=== Group D ===
Pos	Team	Pld	W	D	L	GF	GA	GD	Pts	Status
1	Bashundhara Kings	3	3	0	0	10	0	+10	9	Qualified for Knockout stage
2	Bangladesh Police FC	3	0	2	1	2	3	−1	2	Qualified for Knockout stage
3	Chittagong Abahani	3	0	2	1	2	5	−3	2	
4	Bangladesh Navy	3	0	2	1	2	8	−6	2	

Source: Global Sports Archive
Rules for classification: Group stage tiebreakers
30 November 2021
16:00

Chittagong Abahani	1–1	Bangladesh Police FC
Peter 58' (pen.)	Report	Denilson 48'

BSSS Mostafa Kamal Stadium, Dhaka
Referee: Md Mizanur Rahman
30 November 2021
19:15

Bashundhara Kings	6–0	Bangladesh Navy
Vranješ 41', 68'; Fernandes 43'; Eleta 79'; Robinho 90+1'; Habibur 90+2' (o.g.)	Report

BSSS Mostafa Kamal Stadium, Dhaka
Referee: Md Alamgir Sarkar

4 December 2021
16:00

Bangladesh Police FC	0–1	Bashundhara Kings
	Report	Robinho 16' (pen.)

BSSS Mostafa Kamal Stadium, Dhaka
Referee: Anisur Rahman Sagor
4 December 2021
18:00

Bangladesh Navy	1–1	Chittagong Abahani
Jewel 14'	Report	Yisa 89'

BSSS Mostafa Kamal Stadium, Dhaka
Referee: Saimoon Hasan Sany

8 December 2021
16:00

Bangladesh Police FC	1–1	Bangladesh Navy
Bablu 51'	Report	Sharifi 72' (o.g.)

BSSS Mostafa Kamal Stadium, Dhaka
Referee: Mahmud Zamil Farouqee Nahid
8 December 2021
18:00

Bashundhara Kings	3–0	Chittagong Abahani
Robinho 22'; Ibrahim 83'; Motin 88'	Report

BSSS Mostafa Kamal Stadium, Dhaka
Referee: Md Alamgir Sarkar

== Knockout stage ==
- In the knockout stages, if a match finished goalless at the end of normal playing time, extra time would have been played (two periods of 15 minutes each) and followed, if necessary, by a penalty shoot-out to determine the winner.

=== Bracket ===
Quarter-finals
10 December – Dhaka
Dhaka Abahani	4
Bangladesh Army	0
10 December – Dhaka
Saif Sporting Club (a.e.t.)	2
Swadhinata KS	0
12 December – Dhaka
Sheikh Russel KC	0
Bangladesh Police FC	1
12 December – Dhaka
Bashundhara Kings	4
Sheikh Jamal DC	0

Semi-finals
14 December – Dhaka
Dhaka Abahani	2
Saif Sporting Club	0
14 December – Dhaka
Bangladesh Police FC	1
Bashundhara Kings (a.e.t.)	2

Final
18 December – Dhaka
Dhaka Abahani	3
Bashundhara Kings	0

=== Quarter-finals ===
10 December 2021
17:15

Dhaka Abahani	4–0	Bangladesh Army
Colindres 45', 70'; Jibon 67'; Emon 76'	Report

BSSS Mostafa Kamal Stadium, Dhaka
Referee: Bituraj Barua
10 December 2021
20:00

Saif Sporting Club	2–0 (a.e.t.)	Swadhinata KS
Maraz 91'; Fahim 99'	Report

BSSS Mostafa Kamal Stadium, Dhaka
Referee: Md Alamgir Sarkar

12 December 2021
17:15

Sheikh Russel KC	0–1	Bangladesh Police FC
	Report	Sharifi 4'

BSSS Mostafa Kamal Stadium, Dhaka
Referee: Md Mizanur Rahman
12 December 2021
20:00

Bashundhara Kings	4–0	Sheikh Jamal DC
Motin 58'; Fernandes 73', 81'; SK Rana 90+4'	Report

BSSS Mostafa Kamal Stadium, Dhaka
Referee: Saimoon Hasan Sany

=== Semi-finals ===
14 December 2021
17:15

Dhaka Abahani	2–0	Saif Sporting Club
Colindres 25'; Jibon 82'	Report

BSSS Mostafa Kamal Stadium, Dhaka
Referee: Md Mizanur Rahman

14 December 2021
20:00

Bangladesh Police FC	1–2 (a.e.t.)	Bashundhara Kings
Quipapá 8'	Report	Ibrahim 30'; Arafat 119'

BSSS Mostafa Kamal Stadium, Dhaka
Attendance: 11,237
Referee: Md Alamgir Sarkar

=== Final ===
18 December 2021
17:30

Dhaka Abahani	3–0	Bashundhara Kings
Rakib 53'; Dorielton 63' (pen.), 72'	Report

BSSS Mostafa Kamal Stadium, Dhaka
Attendance: 20,234
Referee: Md Alamgir Sarkar

== Winners ==
11th Independence Cup (Bangladesh) 2021
Winners

Second title

== Statistics ==
=== Goalscorers ===
There have been 75 goals scored in 28 matches, for an average of 2.68 goals per match.

4 goals

- (Brazil) Dorielton (Dhaka Abahani)

3 goals

- (Brazil) Fernandes (Bashundhara Kings)
- (Brazil) Robinho (Bashundhara Kings)
- (Costa Rica) Daniel Colindres (Dhaka Abahani)
- (Japan) Tetsuaki Misawa (Muktijoddha Sangsad KC)

2 goals

- (Bangladesh) Foysal Ahmed Fahim (Saif Sporting Club)
- (Bangladesh) Mohammad Ibrahim (Bashundhara Kings)
- (Bangladesh) Motin Mia (Bashundhara Kings)
- (Bangladesh) Nabib Newaj Jibon (Dhaka Abahani)
- (Brazil) Ailton Machado (Sheikh Russel KC)
- (Brazil) Raphael Augusto (Dhaka Abahani)
- (Bosnia and Herzegovina) Stojan Vranješ (Bashundhara Kings)

1 goal

- (Afghanistan) Amredin Sharifi (Bangladesh Police FC)
- (Bangladesh) Eleta Kingsley (Bashundhara Kings)
- (Bangladesh) Emon Mahmud Babu (Dhaka Abahani)
- Jewel Rana (Bangladesh Navy)
- Juwel Miah (Bangladesh Air Force)
- (Bangladesh) Mannaf Rabbi (Sheikh Russel KC)
- (Bangladesh) Maraz Hossain Opi (Saif Sporting Club)
- Mehedi Hasan Mithu (Bangladesh Army)
- (Bangladesh) Mehedi Hasan Royal (Dhaka Abahani)
- (Bangladesh) Minhajul Abedin Ballu (Dhaka Mohammedan)
- M S Bablu (Bangladesh Police FC)
- (Bangladesh) Nasirul Islam Nasir (Saif Sporting Club)
- (Bangladesh) Rajib Hossain (Dhaka Mohammedan)
- Ranju Shikdar (Bangladesh Army)
- (Bangladesh) Rakib Hossain (Dhaka Abahani)
- (Bangladesh) Sahed Hossain (Dhaka Mohammedan)
- (Bangladesh) Sanowar Hossain (Rahmatganj MFS)
- (Bangladesh) Sazzad Hossain (Saif Sporting Club)
- (Bangladesh) Shahin Ahammad (Sheikh Jamal DC)
- Shahriar Emon (Bangladesh Army)
- Shamimul Haque (Bangladesh Army)
- (Bangladesh) Sheikh Alamgir Kabir Rana (Bashundhara Kings)
- (Bangladesh) Sohanur Rahman (Sheikh Jamal DC)
- (Bangladesh) Yeasin Arafat (Bashundhara Kings)
- (Bosnia and Herzegovina) Nedo Turković (Swadhinata KS)
- (Brazil) Danilo Quipapá (Bangladesh Police FC)
- (Brazil) Denilson Rodrigues Roldão (Bangladesh Police FC)
- (Egypt) Ahmed Shamsaldin (Muktijoddha Sangsad KC)
- (The Gambia) Solomon King Kanform (Sheikh Jamal DC)
- (Ghana) Philip Adjah (Rahmatganj MFS)
- (Guinea-Bissau) Esmaël Gonçalves (Sheikh Russel KC)
- (Mali) Souleymane Diabate (Dhaka Mohammedan)
- (Nigeria) Emeka Ogbugh (Saif Sporting Club)
- (Nigeria) Kehinde Yisa Anifowoshe (Chittagong Abahani)
- (Nigeria) Mfon Udoh (Saif Sporting Club)
- (Nigeria) Peter Ebimobowei (Chittagong Abahani)
- (Poland) Rafał Zaborowski (Swadhinata KS)
- (Uzbekistan) Evgeniy Kochnov (Uttar Baridhara Club)
- (Uzbekistan) Nodir Mavlonov (Swadhinata KS)
- (Uzbekistan) Otabek Valijonov (Sheikh Jamal DC)

=== Own goals ===
† Bold Club indicates winner of the match

Player	Club	Opponent	Result	Date
(Bangladesh) Mehedi Hasan Mithu	Bangladesh Army	Saif Sporting Club	1–2	28 November 2021
(Bangladesh) Habibur Rahman	Bangladesh Navy	Bashundhara Kings	0–6	30 November 2021
(Bangladesh) Mohammad Al-Amin	Rahmatganj MFS	Swadhinata KS	2–3	3 December 2021
(Bangladesh) Tutul Hossain Badsha	Dhaka Abahani	Rahmatganj MFS	1–3	7 December 2021
(Afghanistan) Amredin Sharifi	Bangladesh Police FC	Bangladesh Navy	1–1	8 December 2021
