= 2021–22 Federation Cup (Bangladesh) =

33rd season of the Bangladesh Federation Cup

Bashundhara Group Federation Cup 2021

Tournament details
- Host country: Bangladesh
- City: 1
- Dates: 25 December 2021 – 9 January 2022
- Teams: 12
- Venue: 1 (in 1 host city)

Final positions
- Champions: Dhaka Abahani (12th title)
- Runners-up: Rahmatganj MFS

Tournament statistics
- Matches played: 19
- Goals scored: 63 (3.32 per match)
- Top scorer(s): (Brazil) Dorielton Gomes (Dhaka Abahani) (Nigeria) Philip Adjah (Rahmatganj MFS) (4 goals each)
- Best player(s): (Costa Rica) Daniel Colindres (Dhaka Abahani)
- Fair play award: Dhaka Abahani

The 2021–22 Federation Cup (due to sponsorship from Bashundhara Group also known as Bashundhara Group Federation Cup 2021) was the 33rd edition of the tournament, the main domestic annual top-tier clubs football competition in Bangladesh organized by Bangladesh Football Federation (BFF). The 12 participants were competed in the tournament. The tournament was played from 25 December 2021 to 9 January 2022. The winner of the tournament earned the slot of playing Qualifying play-off of 2023–24 AFC Cup.

Dhaka Abahani are current champions. The club have defeated Rahmatganj MFS by 2–1 on 9 January 2022 to lift the trophy for the twelfth time.

== Venue ==
All matches was held at BSSS Mostafa Kamal Stadium in Dhaka, Bangladesh.

Dhaka	Dhaka is located in Bangladesh
BSSS Mostafa Kamal Stadium	Dhaka is located in Bangladesh
Capacity: 25,000	Dhaka is located in Bangladesh

== Participating teams ==
The following twelve teams will contest in the tournament.

Team	Appearances	Previous best performance
Bangladesh Police FC	3rd	Runners-up (1975)
Bashundhara Kings (Later withdrew)	4th	Champions (2019–20, 2020–21)
Chittagong Abahani	33rd	Champions (2017)
Dhaka Abahani	33rd	Champions (1982, 1985, 1986, 1988, 1997, 1999, 2000, 2010, 2016, 2017, 2018)
Dhaka Mohammedan	33rd	Champions (1980, 1981, 1982, 1983, 1987, 1989, 1995, 2002, 2008, 2009)
Muktijoddha Sangsad KC (Later withdrew)	33rd	Champions (1994, 2001, 2003)
Rahmatganj MFS	33rd	Runners-up (2019–20)
Sheikh Russel KC	27th	Champions (2012)
Sheikh Jamal DC	11th	Champions (2011-12, 2013, 2015)
Saif Sporting Club	5th	Runners-up (2020–21)
Swadhinata KS	Debut	n/a
Uttar Baridhara Club (Later withdrew)	3rd	Quarter-finals (2020–21)

== Draw ==
The draw ceremony of the tournament were held on 23 December 2021 12:00 BST at 3rd floor of BFF house Motijheel, Dhaka, Bangladesh. The twelve participants were divided into four groups. Top two teams from each group will through into the Knockout stage.

== Group summary ==
Group A	Group B	Group C	Group D
Bashundhara Kings	Dhaka Abahani	Chittagong Abahani	Muktijoddha Sangsad KC
Dhaka Mohammedan	Sheikh Russel KC	Bangladesh Police FC	Rahmatganj MFS
Swadhinata KS	Uttar Baridhara SC	Saif Sporting Club	Sheikh Jamal DC

== Round and dates ==
Dates/Year	Round	Match dates
27 December 2021 – 9 January 2022	Group stages	27 December 2021 – 30 December 2021
27 December 2021 – 9 January 2022	Quarter-finals	2–3 January 2022
27 December 2021 – 9 January 2022	Semi-finals	6 January 2022
27 December 2021 – 9 January 2022	Final	9 January 2022

== Match officials ==
Referees

- (Bangladesh) Bituraj Borua
- (Bangladesh) Md Alamgir Sarkar
- (Bangladesh) Bhubon Mohon Torafder
- (Bangladesh) Saymoon Hasan Sany
- (Bangladesh) Md Anisur Rahman
- (Bangladesh) Mohammad Jalaluddin

Assistant Referees

- (Bangladesh) Md Monir Dhali
- (Bangladesh) Md Rasel Mia
- (Bangladesh) Md Nuruzzaman
- (Bangladesh) Sujoy Borua
- (Bangladesh) Md Khorshed Islam
- (Bangladesh) SM Junayed Sharif
- (Bangladesh) Sheikh Iqbal Alam
- (Bangladesh) Md Mahmudul Hasan Mamun
- (Bangladesh) Sharifuzzaman Khan Tipu
- (Bangladesh) Md Shah Alam

== Group stages ==
Key to colours in group tables
Group winners and runners-up advance to the Knockout-stage

Tiebreakers

Teams were ranked according to points (3 points for a win, 1 point for a draw, 0 points for a loss), and if tied on points, the following tie-breaking criteria were applied, in the order given, to determine the rankings.

1. Points in head-to-head matches among tied teams;
2. Goal difference in head-to-head matches among tied teams;
3. Goals scored in head-to-head matches among tied teams;
4. If more than two teams are tied, and after applying all head-to-head criteria above, a subset of teams are still tied, all head-to-head criteria above are reapplied exclusively to this subset of teams;
5. Goal difference in all group matches;
6. Goals scored in all group matches;
7. Penalty shoot-out if only two teams were tied and they met in the last round of the group;
8. Disciplinary points (yellow card = 1 point, red card as a result of two yellow cards = 3 points, direct red card = 3 points, yellow card followed by direct red card = 4 points);
9. Drawing of lots.

=== Group A ===
Pos	Team	Pld	W	D	L	GF	GA	GD	Pts	Status
1	Dhaka Mohammedan	2	1	1	0	4	1	+3	4 (Note: As the fair play points of the two teams were equal, the group champion and runners-up were determined through a penalty shootout.Dhaka Mohammedan (4–3) Swadhinata KS.)	Advance to Knockout stage
2	Swadhinata KS	2	1	1	0	4	1	+3	4	Advance to Knockout stage
3	Bashundhara Kings	2	0	0	2	0	6	−6	0	Later withdrew

Source: Soccerway
Rules for classification: Group stage tiebreakers
Notes:
25 December 2021
16:00

Bashundhara Kings	0–3 Walkover	Swadhinata KS
	Report

BSSS Mostafa Kamal Stadium, Dhaka
Referee: Md Alamgir Sarkar

27 December 2021
16:00

Dhaka Mohammedan	1–1	Swadhinata KS
Diabate 39'	Report	Nedo 40'
Penalties
Diabate (penalty scored); Jasmin (penalty scored); Saief (penalty scored); Obi Moneke (penalty scored); Aaron (penalty missed)	4–3	Nedo (penalty scored); Nodir (penalty scored); Samimul (penalty scored); Salim (penalty missed); Sajal (penalty missed)

BSSS Mostafa Kamal Stadium, Dhaka
Referee: Md Anisur Rahman Sagor

29 December 2021
18:45

Bashundhara Kings	0–3 Walkover	Dhaka Mohammedan
	Report

BSSS Mostafa Kamal Stadium, Dhaka

=== Group B ===
Pos	Team	Pld	W	D	L	GF	GA	GD	Pts	Status
1	Sheikh Russel KC	2	1	1	0	5	2	+3	4 (Note: As the fair play points of the two teams were equal, the group champion and runners-up were determined through a penalty shootout. Sheikh Russel KC (13–12) Dhaka Abahani.)	Advance to Knockout stage
2	Dhaka Abahani	2	1	1	0	5	2	+3	4	Advance to Knockout stage
3	Uttar Baridhara Club	2	0	0	2	0	6	−6	0	Later withdrew

Source: Soccerway
Rules for classification: Group stage tiebreakers
Notes:
25 December 2021
18:45

Dhaka Abahani	3–0 Walkover	Uttar Baridhara Club
	Report

BSSS Mostafa Kamal Stadium, Dhaka
Referee: Bituraj Borua

27 December 2021
18:45

Sheikh Russel KC	3–0 Walkover	Uttar Baridhara Club
	Report

BSSS Mostafa Kamal Stadium, Dhaka

29 December 2021
16:00

Dhaka Abahani	2–2	Sheikh Russel KC
Dorielton 8', 61'	Report	Rabbi 20'; Ailton 84'
Penalties
	12–13

BSSS Mostafa Kamal Stadium, Dhaka
Referee: Mohammed Jalaluddin

=== Group C ===
Pos	Team	Pld	W	D	L	GF	GA	GD	Pts	Status
1	Saif Sporting Club	2	1	1	0	3	2	+1	4	Advance to Knockout stage
2	Chittagong Abahani	2	1	0	1	3	2	+1	3	Advance to Knockout stage
3	Bangladesh Police FC	2	0	1	1	1	3	−2	1	

Source: Soccerway
Rules for classification: Group stage tiebreakers
26 December 2021
16:00

Bangladesh Police FC	1–1	Saif Sporting Club
Sharifi 90+2' (pen.)	Report	Emery 55' (pen.)

BSSS Mostafa Kamal Stadium, Dhaka
Referee: Saymoon Hasan Sany

28 December 2021
16:00

Bangladesh Police FC	0–2	Chittagong Abahani
	Report	Arifur 24'; Twala 60'

BSSS Mostafa Kamal Stadium, Dhaka
Referee: Md Alamgir Sarkar

30 December 2021
18:45

Chittagong Abahani	1–2	Saif Sporting Club
Arifur 84'	Report	Maraz 34'; Gofurov 38'

BSSS Mostafa Kamal Stadium, Dhaka
Referee: Bituraj Borua

=== Group D ===
Pos	Team	Pld	W	D	L	GF	GA	GD	Pts	Status
1	Sheikh Jamal DC	2	1	1	0	4	1	+3	4 (Note: As the fair play points of the two teams were equal, the group champion and runners-up were determined through a penalty shootout. Sheikh Jamal DC (5–4) Rahmatganj MFS.)	Advance to Knockout stage
2	Rahmatganj MFS	2	1	1	0	4	1	+3	4	Advance to Knockout stage
3	Muktijoddha Sangsad KS	2	0	0	2	0	6	−6	0	Later withdrew

Source: Soccerway
Rules for classification: Group stage tiebreakers
Notes:
26 December 2021
18:45

Muktijoddha Sangsad KC	0–3 Walkover	Sheikh Jamal DC
	Report

BSSS Mostafa Kamal Stadium, Dhaka
Referee: Bhubon Mohon Tarafder

28 December 2021
18:45

Muktijoddha Sangsad KC	0–3 Walkover	Rahmatganj MFS
	Report

BSSS Mostafa Kamal Stadium, Dhaka

30 December 2021
16:00

Rahmatganj MFS	1–1	Sheikh Jamal DC
Sunday 90+1'	Report	Absar 7'
Penalties
	4–5

BSSS Mostafa Kamal Stadium, Dhaka
Referee: Saymoon Hasan Sany

== Knockout stage ==
- In the knockout stages, if a match finished goalless at the end of normal playing time, extra time would have been played (two periods of 15 minutes each) and followed, if necessary, by a penalty shoot-out to determine the winner.

=== Bracket ===
Quarter-finals
2 January – Dhaka
Dhaka Mohammedan	2
Chittagong Abahani	1
2 January – Dhaka
Saif Sporting Club	2
Swadhinata KS	0
3 January – Dhaka
Sheikh Russel KC	3
Rahmatganj MFS (a.e.t.)	4
3 January – Dhaka
Sheikh Jamal DC	0
Dhaka Abahani	6

Semi-finals
6 January – Dhaka
Dhaka Mohammedan	1
Rahmatganj MFS	2
6 January – Dhaka
Saif Sporting Club	3 (3)
Dhaka Abahani (p)	3 (4)

Final
9 January – Dhaka
Rahmatganj MFS	1
Dhaka Abahani	2

=== Quarter-finals ===
2 January 2022
16:30

Dhaka Mohammedan	2–1	Chittagong Abahani
Arafat 65' (o.g.); Emon 73'	Report	Peter 90+1'

BSSS Mostafa Kamal Stadium, Dhaka
Referee: Md Anisur Rahman
2 January 2022
19:30

Saif Sporting Club	2–0	Swadhinata KS
Rahim 40'; Maraz 71'	Report

BSSS Mostafa Kamal Stadium, Dhaka
Referee: Mohammed Jalaluddin

3 January 2022
16:30

Sheikh Russel KC	3–4 (a.e.t.)	Rahmatganj MFS
Amaral 63'; Akmatov 82' (pen.); Ailton 84'	Report	Adjah 28', 45'; Sunday 89'; Ashraful 118'

BSSS Mostafa Kamal Stadium, Dhaka
Referee: Bituraj Borua
3 January 2022
19:30

Sheikh Jamal DC	0–6	Dhaka Abahani
	Report	Dorielton 22', 62'; Raphael 35' (pen.): Colindres 70'; Jibon 81', 90+1'

BSSS Mostafa Kamal Stadium, Dhaka
Referee: Md Mizanur Rahman

=== Semi-finals ===
6 January 2022
16:00

Dhaka Mohammedan	1–2	Rahmatganj MFS
Rajib 5'	Report	Adjah 67'; Sunday 90+1'

BSSS Mostafa Kamal Stadium, Dhaka
Referee: Mohammed Jalaluddin
6 January 2022
19:00

Saif Sporting Club	3–3	Dhaka Abahani
Mfon 19'; Ogbugh 74' (pen.); Sazzad 120+3'	Report	Raphael 10' (pen.); Colindres 90+3'; Rakib 94'
Penalties
Bayisenge (penalty scored); Udoh (penalty missed); Sazzad (penalty scored); Fahim (penalty scored); Jamal (penalty missed)	3–4	Milad (penalty scored); Rezaul (penalty scored); Mehedi (penalty scored); Mamun (penalty missed); Raphael (penalty scored)

BSSS Mostafa Kamal Stadium, Dhaka
Attendance: 5,102
Referee: Md Saymoon Hasan Sany

=== Final ===
The final was held at BSSS Mostafa Kamal Stadium in Dhaka, on 9 January 2022 between Rahmatganj MFS and Abahani Limited Dhaka. Abahani won the match on 1–2 scoreline.

9 January 2022
17:30

Rahmatganj MFS	1–2	Dhaka Abahani
Adjah 70'	Report	Colindres 45+1'; Rakib 64'

BSSS Mostafa Kamal Stadium, Dhaka
Attendance: 17,560
Referee: Bituraj Borua

== Winners ==
33rd Federation Cup (Bangladesh) 2021–22
Winners
Dhaka Abahani
Twelfth Title

== Statistics ==
=== Goalscorers ===
There have been 63 goals scored in 19 matches, for an average of 3.32 goals per match.

4 goals

- (Brazil) Dorielton Gomes (Dhaka Abahani)
- (Nigeria) Philip Adjah (Rahmatganj MFS)

3 goals

- (Costa Rica) Daniel Colindres (Dhaka Abahani)
- (Nigeria) Sunday Chizoba (Rahmatganj MFS)

2 goals

- (Bangladesh) Arifur Rahman (Chittagong Abahani)
- (Bangladesh) Maraz Hossain Opi (Saif Sporting Club)
- (Bangladesh) Nabib Newaj Jibon (Dhaka Abahani)
- (Bangladesh) Rakib Hossain (Dhaka Abahani)
- (Brazil) Ailton Machado (Sheikh Russel KC)
- (Brazil) Raphael Augusto (Dhaka Abahani)

1 goal

- (Afghanistan) Amredin Sharifi (Bangladesh Police FC)
- (Bangladesh) Khandoker Ashraful Islam (Rahmatganj MFS)
- (Bangladesh) Mannaf Rabbi (Sheikh Russel KC)
- (Bangladesh) Nurul Absar (Sheikh Jamal DC)
- (Bangladesh) Rajib Hossain (Dhaka Mohammedan)
- (Bangladesh) Rahim Uddin (Saif Sporting Club)
- (Bangladesh) Shahriar Emon (Dhaka Mohammedan)
- (Bangladesh) Sazzad Hossain (Saif Sporting Club)
- (Bosnia and Herzegovina) Nedo Turković (Swadhinata KS)
- (Brazil) Thiago Amaral (Sheikh Russel KC)
- (Kyrgyzstan) Aizar Akmatov (Sheikh Russel KC)
- (Mali) Souleymane Diabate (Dhaka Mohammedan)
- (Nigeria) Emeka Ogbugh (Saif Sporting Club)
- (Nigeria) Mfon Udoh (Saif Sporting Club)
- (Nigeria) Peter Ebimobowei (Chittagong Abahani)
- (South Africa) William Twala (Chittagong Abahani)
- (Rwanda) Emery Bayisenge (Saif Sporting Club)
- (Uzbekistan) Asror Gofurov (Saif Sporting Club)

=== Own goals ===
† Bold Club indicates winner of the match

Player	Club	Opponent	Result	Date
(Bangladesh) Arafat Hossen	Chittagong Abahani	Dhaka Mohammedan	1–2	2 January 2022
