= Higor Leite =

Brazilian footballer (born 1993)

Personal information
- Full name: Higor Barbosa Rodrigues Leite
- Date of birth: 2 June 1993 (age 33)
- Place of birth: Campos Belos, Brazil
- Height: 1.77 m (5 ft 9 1/2 in)
- Position: Midfielder

Team information
- Current team: ASA

Youth career
- 2010–2011: Internacional
- 2011–2012: Fluminense

Senior career*
Years	Team	Apps	(Gls)
2012–2018	Fluminense	18	(0)
2013	→ Avaí (loan)	9	(2)
2014	→ Criciúma (loan)	1	(0)
2015	→ Volta Redonda (loan)	12	(1)
2016	→ Goiás (loan)	4	(0)
2017	→ Volta Redonda (loan)	17	(2)
2018	ABC	33	(8)
2018	Londrina	18	(0)
2019	Paraná	10	(0)
2019	Londrina	24	(1)
2020	Novorizontino	6	(0)
2020–2021	Botafogo-PB	15	(0)
2021–2022	Pyunik	21	(2)
2023	Audax RJ	12	(3)
2023	Londrina	21	(1)
2023–2024	Sheikh Jamal Dhanmondi	12	(2)
2025	AA Aparecidense	18	(4)
2026–	ASA	19	(2)
- * Club domestic league appearances and goals as of 19 November 2026

Higor Barbosa Rodrigues Leite, better known as Higor or Higor Leite, is a Brazilian footballer who plays as a midfielder for ASA.

== Career ==
On 3 February 2021, Higor signed for Armenian Premier League club Pyunik. On 1 June 2022, Higor left Pyunik after his contract expired.

== Honours ==
Fluminense

- Campeonato Brasileiro Série A: 2012

Pyunik

- Armenian Premier League: 2021–22
