= Milad Sheykh Soleimani =

Iranian footballer

Milad Sheykhi Soleimani
Personal information
- Date of birth: 9 February 1992 (age 34)
- Place of birth: Izeh, Iran
- Height: 1.85 m (6 ft 1 in)
- Positions: Centre back; left back

Team information
- Current team: Mes Soongoun
- Number: 23

Youth career
- 2008–2012: Naft Masjed Soleyman

Senior career*
Years	Team	Apps	(Gls)
2012–2017	Naft Masjed Soleyman	43	(2)
2015–2016	→ Fajr Sepasi (loan)	4	(0)
2017–2018	Shahrdari Mahshahr	27	(1)
2018–2019	Sepidrood	26	(2)
2019–2021	Paykan	20	(1)
2021–2022	Abahani Limited Dhaka	20	(1)
2022–2023	Shams Azar	6	(1)
2023	Naft Masjed Soleyman	5	(1)
2023–2024	Abahani Limited Dhaka	15	(0)
2024–	Mes Soongoun	18	(0)
- * Club domestic league appearances and goals as of 22 April 2025

Milad Sheykhi Soleimani (Persian: میلاد شیخی سلیمانی; born 9 February 1992) is an Iranian professional footballer who plays as a defender for Azadegan League club Mes Soongoun.

== Club career ==
=== Club career statistics ===
- Last Update: 1 August 2014

Club performance			League		Cup		Continental		Total	
Season	Club	League	Apps	Goals	Apps	Goals	Apps	Goals	Apps	Goals
Iran			League		Hazfi Cup		Asia		Total	
2012–13	Naft Masjed Soleyman	Azadegan League	12	1	0	0	–	–	12	1
2013–14	Naft Masjed Soleyman	Azadegan League	18	1	1	0	–	–	19	1
2014–15	Naft Masjed Soleyman	Iran Pro League	2	0	0	0	–	–	2	0
Career total			32	2	1	0	0	0	33	2

- Assist goals

Season	Team	Assists
14–15	Naft Masjed Soleyman	0

== Honours ==
Dhaka Abahani

- Independence Cup: 2021–22
- Federation Cup: 2021–22
