= Rajib Hossain =

Bangladeshi footballer

Personal information
- Full name: Mohammed Rajib Hossain
- Date of birth: 10 March 2005 (age 21)
- Place of birth: Savar, Dhaka, Bangladesh
- Height: 5 ft 9 in (1.75 m)
- Positions: Right-back; center-back

Team information
- Current team: Mohammedan SC
- Number: 32

Youth career
- 2016–: BKSP

Senior career*
| Years | Team | Apps | (Gls) |
| 2020–2023 | Mohammedan SC | 44 | (0) |
| 2023–2024 | Sheikh Jamal DC | 9 | (0) |
| 2024– | Mohammedan SC | 0 | (0) |

International career^{‡}
| 2019 | Bangladesh U16 | 7 | (0) |
| 2022– | Bangladesh U20 | 10 | (0) |
Medal record
Men's football
Representing Bangladesh
SAFF U-17 Championship
| Bronze medal – third place | 2019 India | Team |
SAFF U-20 Championship
| Winner | 2024 Nepal | Team |
- * Club domestic league appearances and goals as of 29 May 2024 ‡ National team caps and goals as of 29 September 2024

Rajib Hossain (Bengali: রাজিব হোসেন; born 10 March 2005) is a Bangladeshi professional footballer who plays as a defender for Bangladesh Premier League club Mohammedan SC.

== Early life ==
Rajib grew up in a family of four brothers and two sisters, he lost his father at a young age, and was raised by his mother. In 2016, his elder brother paid for his admission to Bangladesh Krira Shikkha Protishtan (BKSP), where he was selected through trials. In 2020, he caught the eye of Mohammedan SC team manager, Imtiaz Ahmed Nakib, and head coach Sean Lane, when the Black and Whites played a pre-season friendly against BKSP football team. After the game, Rajib signed a three-year contract with Mohammedan.

== Club career ==
=== Mohammedan SC ===
On 27 December 2020, he made his professional debut for Mohammedan SC in a 4–1 victory over Muktijoddha Sangsad KC during the 2020 Federation Cup. On 17 February 2021, Rajib made his league debut in a 2–0 victory against Rahmatganj MFS.

On 7 December 2021, he scored against Saif Sporting Club in the 2021 Independence Cup, as Mohammedan lost 1–2. On 6 January 2022, he scored in a 1–2 defeat to Rahmatganj MFS in the semi-finals of the 2021 Federation Cup. He participated in the 2023 Durand Cup as a guest player for Bangladesh Army, appearing against both Mohun Bagan SG and East Bengal during the tournament.

== International career ==
During his time in BKSP Rajib was selected for the Bangladesh U16 team by coach Rob Ryles to participate in both the 2019 SAFF U-15 Championship and 2020 AFC U-16 Championship qualifiers.

In 2022, he participated in the 2023 AFC U-20 Asian Cup qualifiers with the Bangladesh U20, where he played all three qualifying matches, as Bangladesh failed to qualify for the main tournament. In 2023, he was selected in the final squad for the 2022 Asian Games, in Hangzhou, China.

== Career statistics ==
=== Club ===
As of 24 February 2023.

Appearances and goals by club, season and competition
| Club | Season | League | | | Domestic Cup (Note: Appearance(s) in Bangladesh Federation Cup) | | Other (Note: Appearance(s) in Bangladesh Independence Cup) | | Continental | | Total | |
| Club | Season | Division | Apps | Goals | Apps | Goals | Apps | Goals | Apps | Goals | Apps | Goals |
|---|---|---|---|---|---|---|---|---|---|---|---|---|
| Mohammedan SC | 2021–22 | Bangladesh Premier League | 12 | 0 | 1 | 0 | — | | — | | 13 | 0 |
| Mohammedan SC | 2022–23 | Bangladesh Premier League | 18 | 0 | 3 | 1 | 3 | 1 | — | | 24 | 2 |
| Mohammedan SC | 2022–23 | Bangladesh Premier League | 12 | 0 | 4 | 0 | 4 | 0 | — | | 20 | 0 |
| Mohammedan SC | Mohammedan SC total | | 44 | 0 | 8 | 1 | 7 | 1 | 0 | 0 | 59 | 2 |
| Sheikh Jamal DC | 2023–24 | Bangladesh Premier League | 0 | 0 | 0 | 0 | 0 | 0 | — | | 0 | 0 |
| Career total | | | 44 | 0 | 8 | 1 | 7 | 1 | 0 | 0 | 59 | 2 |

== Honours ==
Mohammedan SC

- Federation Cup: 2022–23

Bangladesh U-20

- SAFF U-20 Championship: 2024
