= Atiqur Rahman Fahad =

Bangladeshi footballer

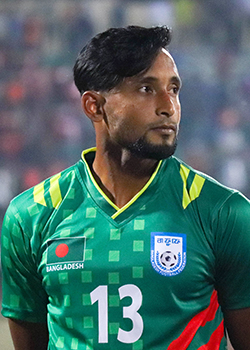
- Fahad with Bangladesh in 2020

Personal information
- Full name: Atiqur Rahman Fahad
- Date of birth: 15 September 1995 (age 31)
- Place of birth: Chittagong, Bangladesh
- Height: 1.77 m (5 ft 10 in)
- Position: Defensive midfielder

Team information
- Current team: Fortis
- Number: 13

Youth career
- 2010–2013: Young Star Blues

Senior career*
| Years | Team | Apps | (Gls) |
| 2013–2016 | Chittagong Abahani | | (1) |
| 2016–2019 | Dhaka Abahani | 23 | (1) |
| 2019–2023 | Bashundhara Kings | 45 | (0) |
| 2023–2024 | Dhanmondi | 10 | (0) |
| 2024– | Fortis | 26 | (0) |

International career^{‡}
| 2013 | Bangladesh U19 | | (0) |
| 2014–2016 | Bangladesh U23 | 5 | (0) |
| 2016– | Bangladesh | 15 | (0) |
- * Club domestic league appearances and goals as of 12 October 2026 ‡ National team caps and goals as of 27 September 2022

Atiqur Rahman Fahad (Bengali: আতিকুর রহমান ফাহাদ; born 15 September 1995) is a Bangladeshi professional footballer who plays as a midfielder for Bangladesh Football League club Fortis, which he captains and the Bangladesh national team.

== International career ==
=== Youth team ===
Fahad was selected by Dutch coach René Koster to represent Bangladesh U19 at the 2014 AFC U-19 Championship qualifiers. The following year, Fahad represented Bangladesh U23 at the 2014 Asian Games. On 15 September 2014, he made his debut against Afghanistan U23. He played only once during the competition and later returned to the team to participate in the 2018 Asian Games.

=== Senior team ===
On March 17, 2016, at the age of just 20 years, 6 months, and 4 days, Fahad came on as a substitute to make his debut for Bangladesh in a friendly match against the UAE. The match was lost 6–1 by Bangladesh in preparation for the 2018 FIFA World Cup qualification – AFC second round. In his debut year for Bangladesh, Fahad played in only one match.

== Honours ==
Chittagong Abahani Limited

- Sheikh Kamal International Club Cup: 2015

Abahani Limited Dhaka

- Bangladesh Premier League: 2016, 2017–18
- Federation Cup: 2016, 2017, 2018

Bashundhara Kings

- Bangladesh Premier League: 2020–21, 2021–22, 2022–23
- Federation Cup: 2019–20, 2020–21
- Independence Cup: 2022–23
