= Ailton (footballer, born 1994) =

Brazilian footballer

Personal information
- Full name: Ailton Machado de Souza Rosa
- Date of birth: 17 April 1994 (age 32)
- Place of birth: Rio de Janeiro, Brazil
- Height: 1.80 m (5 ft 11 in)
- Position: Midfielder

Team information
- Current team: Kasetsart
- Number: 9

Youth career
- –2013: São Paulo
- 2013: → Quissamã (youth loan)

Senior career*
Years	Team	Apps	(Gls)
2014	Passo Fundo	7	(0)
2014	Marcílio Dias		
2015	Santos	0	(0)
2015	Cacereño	2	(0)
2016	Desportivo Brasil		
2016–2017	Comunicaciones		
2017	Vasco da Gama	0	(0)
2018	Nova Iguaçu	5	(0)
2018–2019	Iródotos	10	(1)
2019	Al-Mujazzal		
2019–2020	Oman Club		
2020–2021	Muangkan United	11	(5)
2020–2021	→ Kasetsart (loan)	6	(4)
2021–2022	Sheikh Russel	9	(0)
2023	Samut Sakhon City	8	(3)
2023–	Kasetsart	2	(1)
- * Club domestic league appearances and goals as of 25 February 2024 (UTC)

Ailton Machado de Souza Rosa (born 17 April 1994), commonly known as Ailton, is a Brazilian footballer who plays as midfielder for Kasetsart in the Thai League 2.

== Career statistics ==
=== Club ===
As of 14 July 2020.

Club	Season	League			State league		Cup		Other		Total	
Club	Season	Division	Apps	Goals	Apps	Goals	Apps	Goals	Apps	Goals	Apps	Goals
Passo Fundo	2014	–			7 (Note: Appearances in the Campeonato Gaúcho)	0	0	0	0	0	7	0
Santos	2015	Série A	0	0	0	0	0	0	0	0	0	0
Cacereño	2015–16	Segunda División B	2	0	–		0	0	0	0	2	0
Vasco da Gama	2017	Série A	0	0	0	0	0	0	0	0	0	0
Nova Iguaçu	2018	Série D	5	0	0	0	0	0	1 (Note: Appearances in the Copa Rio)	0	6	0
Iródotos	2018–19	Football League Greece	10	1	–		4 (Note: Appearances in the Greek Cup)	1	0	0	14	2
Career total			17	1	7	0	4	1	1	0	29	2
