= Bir Sherestha Shaheed Shipahi Mostafa Kamal Stadium =

Football stadium in Bangladesh

Bir Shreshtha Shaheed Shipahi Mostafa Kamal Stadium
- Kamalapur Stadium
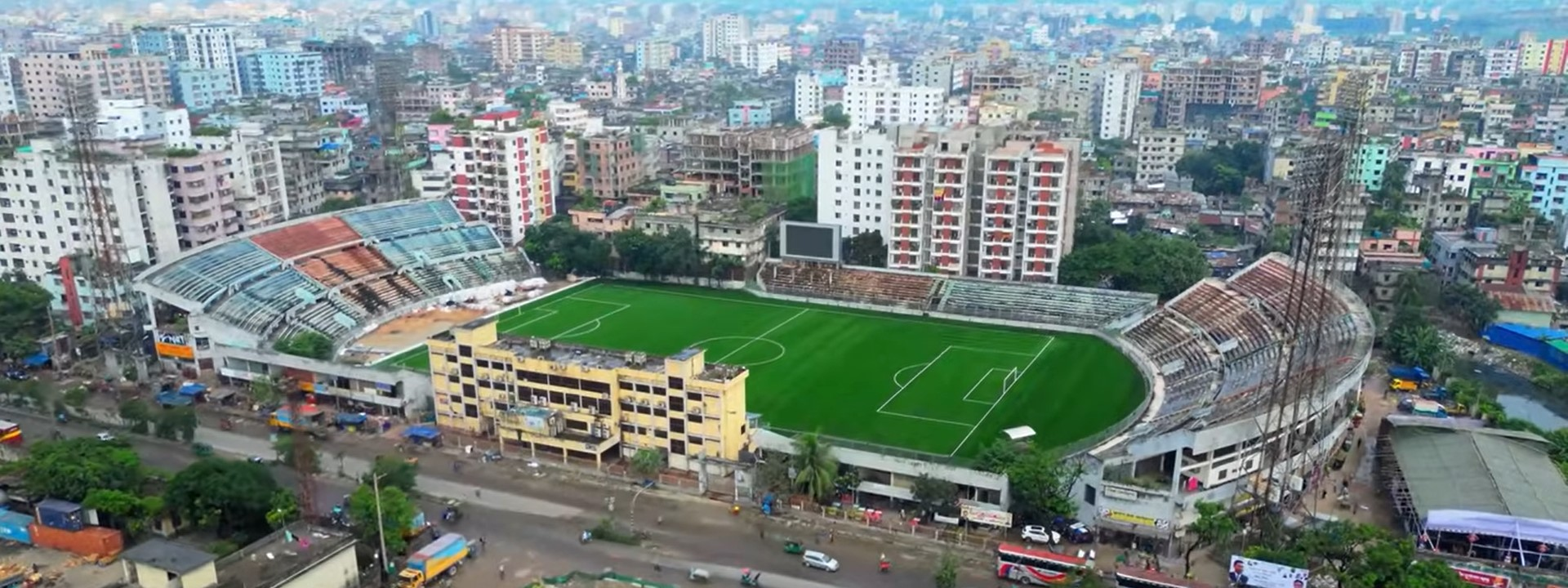
- Interactive map of Bir Shreshtha Shaheed Shipahi Mostafa Kamal Stadium
- Location: Kamalapur, Dhaka, Bangladesh
- Coordinates: 23°43′31.33″N 90°25′46.07″E
- Owner: National Sports Council
- Operator: National Sports Council
- Capacity: 25,000
- Surface: Artificial Turf
- Field size: 150×80 m

Construction
- Opened: 6 August 2003; 22 years ago
- Renovated: 2021

Tenants
- Bangladesh women's national football team Bangladesh Championship League; Dhaka Senior Division Football League; Dhaka Second Division Football League; Bangladesh Women's Football League

Bir Shreshtha Shaheed Shipahi Mostafa Kamal Stadium (Bengali: বীরশ্রেষ্ঠ শহিদ সিপাহি মোস্তফা কামাল ফুটবল স্টেডিয়াম), known commonly as Kamalapur Stadium, is a football stadium located in Kamalapur, Dhaka, Bangladesh. It is one of the main venues of the Bangladesh Championship League and the Dhaka Football League. The stadium can accommodate up to 25,000 spectators.

== See also ==
- List of football stadiums in Bangladesh
- Stadiums in Bangladesh
