= Philip Adjah =

Ghanaian footballer

Personal information
- Full name: Philip Adjah Tettey-Narh
- Date of birth: 25 June 1998 (age 28)
- Place of birth: Accra, Ghana
- Height: 1.78 m (5 ft 10 in)
- Position: Striker

Senior career*
Years	Team	Apps	(Gls)
2018–2019	Mohammedan	30	(31)
2019–2020	Calcutta Customs	6	(4)
2020	NEROCA	9	(9)
2020	Bhawanipore	4	(2)
2020–2021	Mohammedan		
2021	Gokulam Kerala	15	(5)
2021–2022	Rahmatganj MFS	22	(8)
2023	Sidama Coffee		
2024–2025	Sheikh Jamal Dhanmondi		
- * Club domestic league appearances and goals

Philip Adjah Tettey-Narh (born 25 June 1998) is a Ghanaian professional footballer who last played as a forward for Butwal Lumbini

== Career statistics ==
=== Club ===
As of 21 June 2022

Club	Season	League			Cup		Continental		Total	
Club	Season	Division	Apps	Goals	Apps	Goals	Apps	Goals	Apps	Goal
Mohammedan	2018–19	I-League 2nd Division	10	10	0	0	–		10	10
NEROCA	2019–20	I-League	9	9	0	0	–		9	9
Bhawanipore	2020	I-League 2nd Division	4	2	0	0	–		4	2
Mohammedan	2020–21	I-League	0	0	0	0	–		0	0
Gokulam Kerala	2020–21	I-League	15	5	0	0	–		15	5
Rahmatganj MFS	2021–22	Bangladesh Premier League	16	5	4 (Note: Appearance(s) in Federation Cup)	4	–		20	9

== Honours ==
Gokulam Kerala

- I-League: 2020–21
