= 2021–22 BFF U-18 Football League =

1st professional season of the top-flight youth football league in Bangladesh

BFF U-18 Football League
- Season: 2021–22
- Dates: 15 September–24 October 2022
- Champions: Sheikh Jamal U-18 (1 title)
- Matches: 55
- Goals: 160 (2.91 per match)
- Best player: (Bangladesh) Mr. Joy Dash; Sheikh Jamal U-18
- Top goalscorer: 11 goals (Bangladesh) Naymul Talukdar (Muktijoddha SKC U-18)
- Highest scoring: Bashundhara Kings U-18 7–1 Swadhinata KS U-18 (15 September 2022)
- Longest winning run: 6 matches (Sheikh Jamal DC U-18)
- Longest unbeaten run: 7 matches (Sheikh Jamal DC U-18)
- Longest winless run: 9 matches (Swadhinata KS U-18)
- Longest losing run: 9 matches (Swadhinata KS U-18)

The 2021–22 BFF U-18 Football League is the inaugural edition of BFF U-18 Football League, replacing the BFF U-18 Football Tournament. Youth teams of 10 BPL clubs competing in the league. Uttar Baridhara withdrew themselves two days before kicking off the league citing financial crisis, while Saif SC didn't participate as they closed their football department.

Sheikh Jamal DC U-18 is the defending champion having won 2021–22 season title.

== Format ==
The teams would entirely feature U-18 players. The eleven team will play ten matches again each other in a single round basis. A total of 55 matches will be played. The teams occupying league table positions 1, 2 & 3 will be awarded Champions, Runner-up & Third place prize money. The league does not have a relegation system as of the first season.

== Venues ==
All matches are playing following two ground.

Dhaka	Dhaka is located in Bangladesh	Dhaka
Sheikh Jamal DC Football Ground	Dhaka is located in Bangladesh	Govt. Physical Education College Ground

== Teams ==
Team	Head coach	Captain
Bangladesh Police FC U-18	(Bangladesh)	
Bashundhara Kings U-18	(Bangladesh) Mahabub Hossain Roksy	
Chittagong Abahani U-18	(Bangladesh) Shaidul Alam Bulbul	
Dhaka Abahani U-18	(Bangladesh) Pranotosh Kumar Das	
Dhaka Mohammedan U-18	(Bangladesh) Alfaz Ahmed	
Lt.Sheikh Jamal Dhanmondi Club Limited U-18	(Bangladesh) Faraz Hossain	
Muktijoddha Sangsad KC U-18	(Malaysia) Raja Isa	
Rahmatganj MFS U-18	(Bangladesh) Kamal Ahmed Babu	
Sheikh Russel KC U-18	(Bangladesh) Abdul Baten Komol	
Swadhinata KS U-18	(Bangladesh) Masud Alam Jahangir	
Uttar Baridhara U-18	None	

== Standings ==
=== League table ===
Pos	Team	Pld	W	D	L	GF	GA	GD	Pts	Qualification or relegation
1	Sheikh Jamal DC U-18 (C)	10	8	1	1	24	6	+18	25	Champions
2	Bashundhara Kings U-18 (R)	10	6	3	1	25	6	+19	21	Runner-up
3	Muktijoddha Sangsad U-18	10	7	0	3	18	15	+3	21	
4	Rahmatganj MFS U-18	10	6	1	3	20	16	+4	19	
5	Dhaka Abahani U-18	10	5	2	3	15	6	+9	17	
6	Dhaka Mohammedan U-18	10	5	2	3	13	10	+3	17	
7	Sheikh Russel KC U-18	10	4	4	2	12	9	+3	16	
8	Chittagong Abahani U-18	10	3	1	6	16	15	+1	10	
9	Bangladesh Police FC U-18	10	3	0	7	9	20	−11	9	
10	Swadhinata KS U-18	10	1	0	9	8	27	−19	3	
11	Uttar Baridhara U-18	10	0	0	10	0	30	−30	0	

Updated to match(es) played on completed. Source: BFF
Rules for classification: 1) Points; 2) Goal difference; 3) Goals scored.
(C) Champions; (R) Runners-up
Uttar Baridhara U-18 withdrew themselves before the league begun.

== Results ==
No Home \ No Away	BPFC U-18	BK U-18	CAL U-18	DAL U-18	MSC U-18	SJDC U-18	SKS U-18	RAH U-18	SRKC U-18	MUK U-18	UBC U-18 (Note: Opposition were given a Walkover in all games, as Uttar Baridhara U-18 withdrew before the league had begun.)
Bangladesh Police FC U-18	—				1–3				0–1		3–0
Bashundhara Kings U-18		—				1–1	7–1				3–0
Chittagong Abahani U-18	2–1		—							3–4	3–0
Dhaka Abahani U-18				—			2–0			1–2	3–0
Mohammedan SC U-18	3–1				—					0–1	3–0
Sheikh Jamal DC U-18		1–1				—	5–2				3–0
Swadhinata KS U-18		1–7		0–2		2–5	—				3–0
Rahmatganj MFS U-18	4–0							—	2–2		3–0
Sheikh Russel KC U-18	1–0							2–2	—		3–0
Muktijoddha Sangsad KC U-18			4–3	2–1	1–0					—	3–0
Uttar Baridhara U-18 (Note: Opposition were given a Walkover in all games, as Uttar Baridhara U-18 withdrew before the league had begun.)	0–3	0–3	0–3	0–3	0–3	0–3	0–3	0–3	0–3	0–3	—

Source: BFF
Legend: Blue = left column team win; Yellow = draw; Red = top row team win.

== Season statistics ==
=== Goalscorers ===
There have been 160 goals scored in 55 matches, for an average of 2.91 goals per match (as of 23 October 2022).

11 goals

- (Bangladesh) Naymul Talukdar (Muktijoddha SKC U-18)

9 goals

- (Bangladesh) Sabbir Hossain (Bashundhara Kings U-18)

6 goals

- (Bangladesh) Arko Hassan Apurbo (Bashundhara Kings U-18)
- (Bangladesh) Nabidul Islam (Rahmatganj MFS U-18)
- (Bangladesh) Shahadat Hossain (Chittagong Abahani U-18)

5 goals

- (Bangladesh) Asif (Sheikh Jamal DC U-18)
- (Bangladesh) Tanim Hassan (Sheikh Jamal DC U-18)

4 goals

- (Bangladesh) Mohammad Rofikul (Bashundhara Kings U-18)
- (Bangladesh) Mohin (Sheikh Jamal DC U-18)
- (Bangladesh) Md Nurul Islam (Dhaka Mohammedan U-18)
- (Bangladesh) Kagozi Saifullah Bin Hasan (Dhaka Mohammedan U-18)

3 goals

- (Bangladesh) Mohamed Sayeed (Dhaka Abahani U-18)
- (Bangladesh) Sajjat Howot (Rahmatganj MFS U-18)
- (Bangladesh) Rahim Hasan Bilto (Muktijoddha SKC U-18)
- (Bangladesh) Golam Rabbi Khan (Sheikh Jamal DC U-18)
- Ali Akbar (Bangladesh Police FC U-18)

2 goals

- (Bangladesh) Joy Dash (Sheikh Jamal DC U-18)
- (Bangladesh) Mehedi Hasan (Rahmatganj MFS U-18)
- (Bangladesh) Abdur Rahman (Chittagong Abahani U-18)
- (Bangladesh) Dipu (Dhaka Abahani U-18)
- (Bangladesh) Asif (Dhaka Abahani U-18)
- (Bangladesh) Anam (Swadhinata KS U-18)

1 goal

- (Bangladesh) Mashrafee (Bashundhara Kings U-18)
- (Bangladesh) Rajin (Swadhinata KS U-18)
- (Bangladesh) Devjit Karmakar (Muktijoddha SKC U-18)
- (Bangladesh) Md Shahadat Hossain (Dhaka Abahani U-18)
- (Bangladesh) Aminul Islam Rakib (Rahmatganj MFS U-18)
- (Bangladesh) Sheikh Sangram (Rahmatganj MFS U-18)
- (Bangladesh) Md Noyon (Sheikh Jamal DC U-18)
- (Bangladesh) Abrar Hossain (Dhaka Abahani U-18)
- (Bangladesh) Alif Mahmud (Rahmatganj MFS U-18)
- (Bangladesh) Sabbir Hossain (Chittagong Abahani U-18)
- (Bangladesh) Abdul Nur Alam Apu (Chittagong Abahani U-18)
- (Bangladesh) Mashrafi (Dhaka Abahani U-18)
- (Bangladesh) Irfan (Sheikh Russel KC U-18)
- (Bangladesh) Ramjan (Bashundhara Kings U-18)
- (Bangladesh) Raju (Bashundhara Kings U-18)
- Tasnim (Bangladesh Police FC U-18)
- (Bangladesh) Apon (Sheikh Russel KC U-18)
- (Bangladesh) Monir (Swadhinata KS U-18)
- (Bangladesh) Rafikul (Sheikh Russel KC U-18)
- (Bangladesh) Md Ratul Hawladar (Dhaka Mohammedan U-18)
- Akash (Bangladesh Police FC U-18)
- (Bangladesh) Rafiul (Sheikh Russel KC U-18)
- (Bangladesh) Atik (Dhaka Abahani U-18)
- (Bangladesh) Alauddin (Dhaka Abahani U-18)
- (Bangladesh) Rakibul Islam Rocky (Chittagong Abahani U-18)
- (Bangladesh) Saiful (Sheikh Russel KC U-18)
- Forhad (Bangladesh Police FC U-18)
- (Bangladesh) Tahmid (Sheikh Russel KC U-18)
- (Bangladesh) Mahi Azom (Rahmatganj MFS U-18)
- (Bangladesh) Md Sajib Hossain (Dhaka Mohammedan U-18)
- (Bangladesh) Sabel (Sheikh Russel KC U-18)
- (Bangladesh) Swapon (Sheikh Jamal DC U-18)
- (Bangladesh) Nahid (Swadhinata KS U-18)
- (Bangladesh) Soykat Chakma (Chittagong Abahani U-18)
- (Bangladesh) Sajjad Hossain Mijan (Chittagong Abahani U-18)

Source: BFF

Unknown Goalscorers

- Sheikh Russel KC U-18 2-2 Rahmatganj MFS U-18 match of 4 goals scorers players name unknown.

=== Hat-tricks ===
Player	For	Against	Result	Date
(Bangladesh) Sabbir Hossain	Bashundhara Kings U-18	Swadhinata U-18	7–1	15 September 2022
(Bangladesh) Shahadat Hossain	Chittagong Abahani U-18	Swadhinata U-18	4–0	16 October 2022
(Bangladesh) Naymul Talukdar ^{4}	Muktijoddha SKC U-18	Chittagong Abahani U-18	4–3	23 October 2022

== See also ==
- BPL (2021–22)
- BFF U-16 (2021–22)
