= 2024–25 Sheikh Jamal Dhanmondi Club season =

Sheikh Jamal DC
2024–25 season
- Owner: Bashundhara Group
- President: Safwan Sobhan Tasvir
- Head coach: Marjan Sekulovski (until 30 January 2024); Francisco Bruto Da Costa (caretaker) (4 December 2023 – 14 January 2024); Saifur Rahman Moni (caretaker) (15 January 2024 – 30 January 2024); Zulfiker Mahmud Mintu (from 30 January 2024)
- Stadium: Sheikh Fazlul Haque Mani Stadium
- Bangladesh Premier League: Withdrew
- Federation Cup: Failed to participate

The 2024–25 season is Sheikh Jamal Dhanmondi Club's 63rd season since its establishment in 1962 and its 13th competitive season in the Bangladesh Premier League. In addition to the domestic league, Sheikh Jamal will participate in this season's edition of the Federation Cup and Independence Cup. The season covers the period from 1 June 2024 to 30 June 2025.

== Current squad ==
As of 22 August 2024

No.	Player	Nat.	Position(s)	Date Of Birth	Year signed	Previous club
Goalkeepers
22	Md Billal Hossain	(Bangladesh)	GK		2023	Shams Ul Huda FA
Defenders
33	Md Sumon Ahmed	(Bangladesh)	CB	18 May 2002 (aged 21)	2023	Muktijoddha Sangsad
Midfielders
44	Md Alamgir	(Bangladesh)	AM		2023	Shams Ul Huda FA
88	Md Afnan Ishraq	(Bangladesh)	AM		2023	
Forwards
77	Fayed Azim Ifty	(Bangladesh)	FW		2023	

== Transfer ==
=== Transfer Out ===
No.	Pos	Player	Moved to	Fee	Date	Source
17	FW	Foysal Ahmed Fahim	Bashundhara Kings	Free transfer	3 June 2024	
18	MF	Jayed Ahmed	Bangladesh Police FC	Free transfer	30 July 2024	
36	GK	Hamidur Rahman Remon	Dhaka Wanderers Club	Free transfer	1 August 2024	

== Competitions ==
Win Draw Loss Fixtures

=== Overall ===
Competition	First match	Last match	Final Position
BPL			Withdrew
Federation Cup			Failed to participate

=== Premier League ===
==== League table ====
Pos	Team	Pld	W	D	L	GF	GA	GD	Pts	Qualification or relegation
1	Mohammedan (Note: Mohammedan does not possess an AFC Challenge League licence.) (C)	18	13	3	2	46	16	+30	42	
2	Dhaka Abahani	18	10	5	3	31	8	+23	35	Qualification for the AFC Challenge League qualifying stage
3	Bashundhara Kings (W)	18	9	5	4	45	15	+30	32	Qualification for the AFC Challenge League qualifying stage (Note: as Federation Cup winners.)
4	Rahmatganj	18	9	3	6	39	25	+14	30	
5	Brothers Union	18	7	6	5	28	18	+10	27	
6	Fortis	18	6	9	3	24	15	+9	27	
7	Bangladesh Police	18	8	3	7	23	24	−1	27	
8	Fakirerpool	18	6	1	11	23	54	−31	19	
9	Dhaka Wanderers (R)	18	3	1	14	14	55	−41	10	Relegation to BCL
10	Chittagong Abahani (R)	18	1	0	17	7	50	−43	3	Relegation to BCL

Source: Soccerway
Rules for classification: 1) Points; 2) Goal difference; 3) Goals scored.
(C) Champion; (R) Relegated; (W) Cup Winner

== Statistics ==
=== Goalscorers ===
As of 2024

Rank	Player	Position	Total	BPL	Independence Cup	Federation Cup
1	TBC	TBC	0	0	0	0
Total			0	0	0	0
