= 2023–24 Fortis FC season =

Fortis FC 2023–24 football season

Fortis FC
2023–24 season
- Owner: Fortis Group
- President: Md Shahin Hasan
- Head coach: Masud Parvez Kaisar
- Stadium: Muktijuddho Sriti Stadium
- Bangladesh Premier League: 5th of 10
- Federation Cup: Quarter-finals
- Independence Cup: Group stages
- Top goalscorer: League: Pa Omar Babou; Valeriy Gryshyn (6 goals); All: Pa Omar Babou (8 goals)
- Biggest win: 3–1 v Sheikh Russel KC (Neutral); 23 January 2023 (Federation Cup); 3–1 v Chittagong Abahani (Home); 29 May 2024 (Premier League)
- Biggest defeat: 0–4 v Mohammedan SC (Away); 29 March 2024 (Premier League)

The 2023–24 season was the Fortis FC's 4th season since its establishment in 2020 and their 2nd season in the Bangladesh Premier League. They achieved promotion to the Bangladesh Premier league after being crowned the 2021–22 Bangladesh Championship League title. In addition to domestic league, Fortis FC was participated on this season's edition of Federation Cup and Independence Cup. The season covered the period from 1 August 2023 to 31 May 2024.

== Players ==
As of 24 March 2023

No.	Player	Nat.	Position(s)	Date of birth	Year signed	Previous club
Goalkeepers
1	Azad Hossain	(Bangladesh)	GK	15 February 1999 (aged 24)	2022	Chittagong Abahani
22	Shanto Kumar Roy	(Bangladesh)	GK	2 September 2003 (aged 20)	2022	Saif Sporting Club
25	Omar Faruk Linkon	(Bangladesh)	GK	25 January 1997 (aged 26)	2023	Rahmatganj MFS
30	Md Antor Ali	(Bangladesh)	GK	23 November 2006 (aged 16)	2023	Fortis Academy
32	Md Sarwar Jahan	(Bangladesh)	GK	5 August 1986 (aged 37)	2024	Sheikh Russel KC
Defenders
2	Abdullah Omar Sajib	(Bangladesh)	CB	17 October 1994 (aged 29)	2020	
3	Saddam Hossain Anny	(Bangladesh)	LB	21 January 1991 (aged 32)	2023	Rahmatganj MFS
4	Sabuz Hossain	(Bangladesh)	CB	23 July 2002 (aged 21)	2022	Saif Sporting Club
5	Jasur Jumaev	(Uzbekistan)	CB	16 January 2000 (aged 23)	2023	(Uzbekistan) Xorazm Urganch
6	Mojammel Hossain Nira	(Bangladesh)	RB	15 October 1998 (aged 25)	2022	Sheikh Jamal DC
12	Noyon Mia	(Bangladesh)	RB	6 February 1999 (aged 24)	2023	Rahmatganj MFS
16	Rashedul Islam Rashed	(Bangladesh)	LB	15 January 1990 (aged 33)	2023	Muktijoddha Sangsad
24	Kamacai Marma Aky	(Bangladesh)	CB		2023	Fortis Academy
75	Md Shajahan Ali	(Bangladesh)	CB		2024	
Midfielders
8	Mamunul Islam	(Bangladesh)	CM	12 December 1988 (aged 34)	2022	Rahmatganj MFS
14	Imtiaz Sultan Jitu	(Bangladesh)	CM	10 February 1990 (aged 33)	2023	Dhaka Abahani
15	Md Roman	(Bangladesh)	AM	6 May 1996 (aged 27)	2023	Muktijoddha Sangsad
20	Mazharul Islam Sourav	(Bangladesh)	DM	1 January 1990 (aged 33)	2022	Sheikh Jamal DC
21	Farhad Mona	(Bangladesh)	DM	24 June 2002 (aged 21)	2023	Chittagong Abahani
23	Didarul Alam	(Bangladesh)	AM/LM	5 January 1996 (aged 27)	2022	Muktijoddha Sangsad
28	Mostajeb Khan	(Bangladesh)	CM	4 April 2000 (aged 23)	2020	Chittagong Abahani
29	Shantu Das	(Bangladesh)	DM		2023	Uttara FC
33	Soma Otani	(Japan)	AM	25 July 1990 (aged 33)	2024	Muktijoddha Sangsad
Forwards
7	Borhan Uddin	(Bangladesh)	RW	1 May 2001 (aged 22)	2020	Tongi Krira Chakra
9	Amir Hakim Bappy	(Bangladesh)	RW	11 March 2001 (aged 22)	2023	Mohammedan SC
10	Pa Omar Babou	(The Gambia)	FW	1 October 1998 (aged 25)	2023	(Morocco) SCC Mohammédia
11	Shakhawat Hossain Rony	(Bangladesh)	CF	8 October 1991 (aged 32)	2022	Chittagong Abahani
17	Valeriy Gryshyn	(Ukraine)	RW/LW/AM	12 May 1994 (aged 29)	2023	(Cambodia) Phnom Penh Crown FC
19	Arman Foysal Akash	(Bangladesh)	CF/AM	13 January 2004 (aged 19)	2023	AFC Uttara
26	Rahmat Ullah Jisan	(Bangladesh)	CF	3 June 2005 (aged 18)	2023	Fortis Academy
27	Joseph Nur Rahman	(Bangladesh)	CF/RW	25 December 1986 (aged 36)	2023	Fortis FC
31	Omar Sarr	(The Gambia)	CF	2 September 1994 (aged 29)	2023	
Players on loan
18	Sajed Hasan Jummon Nijum	(Bangladesh)	AM/RW	5 January 2004 (aged 19)	2023	BFF Elite Academy
Left during the season
13	Salim Reza	(Bangladesh)	CB	10 August 1993 (aged 30)	2023	Sheikh Russel KC

== Friendlies ==
=== Pre-season ===
10 October 2023	Fortis FC	4–1	Bangladesh Navy	Badda, Dhaka
19:00 UTC+6				Stadium: Frotis Sports Ground

=== Mid-season ===
26 November 2023	Fortis FC	1–4	Sheikh Jamal DC	Dhaka
14:30 BST (UTC+6)	Gryshyn 41'	Report	Sazzad 45'; Bladimir 48'; Stanley 59'; Al Amin 80'	Stadium: Fortis Training Ground

== Transfers ==
=== Transfers in ===
Date	Position	No.	Player	From	Fee	Source
29 July 2023	FW	12	Amir Hakim Bappy	Mohammedan SC	Free	
October 2023	FW	19	Arman Foysal Akash	AFC Uttara	Free	
October 2023	MF	29	Shantu Das	Uttara FC	Free	
October 2023	DF	16	Rashedul Islam Rashed	Muktijoddha Sangsad	Free	
October 2023	GK	25	Omar Faruk Linkon	Rahmatganj MFS	Free	
October 2023	DF	13	Salim Reza	Sheikh Russel KC	Free	
October 2023	MF	14	Imtiaz Sultan Jitu	Dhaka Abahani	Free	
October 2023	MF	15	Md Roman	Muktijoddha Sangsad	Free	
October 2023	MF	21	Farhad Mona	Chittagong Abahani	Free	
October 2023	DF	3	Saddam Hossain Anny	Rahmatganj MFS	Free	
October 2023	FW	29	Joseph Nur Rahman	Free Agent	Free	
October 2023	DF	5	(Uzbekistan) Jasur Jumaev	(Uzbekistan) Xorazm Urganch	Free	
October 2023	FW	17	(Ukraine) Valeriy Gryshyn	(Cambodia) Phnom Penh Crown	Free	
October 2023	FW	31	(The Gambia) Omar Sarr	Free Agent	Free	
October 2023	FW	26	Rahmat Ullah Jisan	Fortis FC Academy	Promoted	
October 2023	GK	30	Md Antor Ali	Fortis FC Academy	Promoted	
October 2023	DF	24	Kamacai Marma Aky	Fortis FC Academy	Promoted	
March 2024	GK	37	Md Sarwar Jahan	Free Agent	Free	
March 2024	DF	75	Md Shajahan Ali	Free Agent	Free	
March 2024	MF	33	(Japan) Soma Otani	Free Agent	Free	
March 2024	FW		(Nepal) Anjan Bista	(Nepal) Jhapa FC	Free	

=== Loans in ===
No.	Pos	Player	From	Fee	Date	On loan until	Source
18	MF	Sajed Hasan Jummon Nijum	BFF Elite Academy	Tk 7.25 lakh	26 August 2023	23 July 2024	

=== Transfers out ===
Date	Position	No.	Player	Moved to	Fee	Source
June 2024	GK	17	Uttam Barua	Retired	N/A	
July 2024	MF	17	Mojibur Rahman Jony	Bashundhara Kings	Free	
July 2024	FW	18	Rafiqul Islam	Bashundhara Kings	Free	
August 2023	GK	30	Mitul Marma	Sheikh Russel KC	Free	
August 2023	DF	2	Shahin Mia	Sheikh Russel KC	Free	
August 2023	DF	3	Ariful Islam Jitu	Sheikh Russel KC	Free	
August 2023	MF	16	Shahidul Islam Sumon	Sheikh Russel KC	Free	
September 2023	FW	77	(The Gambia) Garcia Joof	Free Agent	Released	
May 2023	FW	9	(Afghanistan) Amredin Sharifi	Free Agent	Released	
October 2024	MF	7	Kawsar Ali Rabbi	Chittagong Abahani	Free	
October 2024	DF	13	Joynal Abedin Dipu	Sheikh Jamal DC	Free	
October 2024	FW	21	Md Jahedul Alam	Chittagong Abahani	Free	
March 2024	DF	13	Salim Reza	Uttara FC	Free	
March 2024	FW		(Nepal) Anjan Bista	Free Agent	Released	

=== Loans out ===
No.	Position	Player	Loaned to	Fee	Date	On loan until	Ref.
4	MF	(Brazil) Danilo Quipapá	Dhaka Abahani	Free	1 August 2023	31 August 2023	

== Competitions ==
Win Draw Loss Fixtures

=== Overall ===
Competition	First match	Last match	Final Position
BPL	22 December 2023	29 May 2024	5th
Federation Cup	26 December 2023	30 March 2024	Quarter-final
Independence Cup	31 October 2023	4 November 2023	Group stage

=== Overview ===
Competition	Record							
Competition	Pld	W	D	L	GF	GA	GD	Win %
BPL	18	6	6	6	21	23	−2	33.33
Independence Cup	2	0	0	2	1	1	+0	0.00
Federation Cup	3	1	0	2	4	5	−1	33.33
Total	23	7	6	10	26	29	−3	30.43

Source: Competitions

=== Premier League ===
==== League table ====
Pos	Team	Pld	W	D	L	GF	GA	GD	Pts
3	Abahani Ltd. Dhaka	18	9	5	4	34	22	+12	32
4	Bangladesh Police FC	18	7	5	6	23	19	+4	26
5	Fortis FC	18	6	6	6	21	23	−2	24
6	Sheikh Russel KC	18	4	7	7	20	24	−4	19
7	Chittagong Abahani	18	4	7	7	22	29	−7	19

Source: Soccerway
Rules for classification: 1) Points; 2) Goal difference; 3) Goals scored.

==== Results summary ====
Overall								Home						Away					
Pld	W	D	L	GF	GA	GD	Pts	W	D	L	GF	GA	GD	W	D	L	GF	GA	GD
18	6	6	6	21	23	−2	24	3	2	3	12	11	+1	3	4	3	9	12	−3

Source: Soccerway

==== Results by round ====
Round	1	2	3	4	5	6	7	8	9	10	11	12	13	14	15	16	17	18
Ground	H	H	A	H	A	H	A	H	A	A	A	H	A	H	A	H	A	H
Result	L	W	L	D	D	D	L	W	W	L	D	L	W	L	D	D	W	W
Position	7	5	8	6	7	6	8	7	5	6	6	6	6	6	6	6	5	5

Source: Matches
A = Away; H = Home; W = Win; D = Draw; L = Loss; P = Postponed

=== Matches ===
22 December 2023 1	Fortis FC	1–2	Mohammedan SC	Rajshahi
14:30 BST (UTC+6)	Jumaev (yellow card) 15'; Sarr 43'	Report	Emon 13'; Muzaffarov (yellow card) 29'; Emmanuel 90'	Stadium: Muktijuddho Sriti Stadium; Referee: Sabuj Kumar Das

30 December 2023 2	Fortis FC	1–0	Dhaka Abahani	Rajshahi
14:30 BST (UTC+6)	Valeriy 37'; Rashed (yellow card) 67'; Bappy (yellow card) 90+5'	Report		Stadium: Muktijuddho Sriti Stadium; Referee: Bhubon Mohon Tarafder

12 January 2024 3	Bashundhara Kings	3–1	Fortis FC	Dhaka
17:00 BST (UTC+6)	Rakib 9'; Dori 21' (yellow card) 27'; Rimon 77'	Report	Tariq 13' (o.g.)	Stadium: Bashundhara Kings Arena; Referee: Mohammed Jalal Uddin

19 January 2023 4	Fortis FC	2–2	Rahmatganj MFS	Rajshahi
14:45 BST (UTC+6)	Jumaev 22'; Valeriy (yellow card) 68'; Roy (yellow card) 71'; Pa Omar 82' (pen.)	Report	Ceesay 31'; Boateng 72' (pen.)	Stadium: Muktijuddho Sriti Stadium; Referee: Md Mizanur Rahman

27 January 2023 5	Sheikh Russel KC	0–0	Fortis FC	Dhaka
14:45 BST (UTC+6)	Emon (yellow card) 36'; Monir (yellow card) 51'; Chandon (yellow card) 69'	Report	Pa Omar (yellow card) 36'; Farhad (yellow card) 43'; Jumaev (yellow card) 46'; Noyon (yellow card) 90'	Stadium: Bashundhara Kings Arena; Referee: Sobus Kumar Das

3 February 2023 6	Fortis FC	2–2	Brothers Union	Rajshahi
15:00 BST (UTC+6)	Pa Omar 41' (pen.); Roman (yellow card) 53'; Valeriy 78'	Report	Rahul 8'; Monir (yellow card) 52'; Otabek (yellow card) 63'; Sufil 69'	Stadium: Muktijuddho Sriti Stadium; Referee: Bhubon Mohon Tarafder

10 February 2023 7	Sheikh Jamal DC	1–0	Fortis FC	Gopalganj
15:00 BST (UTC+6)	Kholmatov (yellow card) 49'; Sazzad (yellow card) 59'; Fahim 63'; Fahad (yellow card) 83' (yellow-red card) 90+3'	Report	Rashed (yellow card) 41'; Farhad (yellow card) 48'; Pa Omar (yellow card) 83'	Stadium: Sheikh Fazlul Haque Mani Stadium; Referee: Md Mizanur Rahman

16 February 2023 8	Fortis FC	2–1	Bangladesh Police	Rajshahi
15:00 BST (UTC+6)	Omar (yellow card) 45+1'; Pa Omar 51'; Sourav (yellow card) 61'; Valeriy 90+4'	Report	Morillo 80'	Stadium: Muktijuddho Sriti Stadium; Referee: Md Nasir Uddin

24 February 2024 9	Chittagong Abahani	0–2	Fortis FC	Munshigonj
15:00 BST (UTC+6)	Muritala (yellow card) 63'	Report	Farhad (yellow card) 28'; Sabuz (yellow card) 46'; Jumayev (yellow card) 64'; Muritala 76' (o.g.); Sarr 82'	Stadium: Bir Sreshtho Fl. Lt. Matiur Rahman Stadium; Referee: Mohammed Jalal Uddin

29 March 2024 10	Mohammedan SC	4–0	Fortis FC	Mymensingh
15:15 BST (UTC+6)	Muzaffarov 41'; Diabate (pen.), 45+1'; Iqbal 52'; Emon 59'	Report		Stadium: Rafiq Uddin Bhuiyan Stadium; Referee: Md Alamgir Sarker

5 April 2024 11	Dhaka Abahani	1–1	Fortis FC	Gopalganj
15:15 BST (UTC+6)	Cornelius 90+5'; Bruninho (yellow card) 68'	Report	Valeriy 61'	Stadium: Sheikh Fazlul Haque Mani Stadium; Referee: Arisur Rahman Sagor

20 April 2024 12	Fortis FC	0–1	Bashundhara Kings	Rajshahi
15:00 BST (UTC+6)	Sabuz (yellow card) 40'	Report	Figueira 23', (yellow card) 40'; Bishwanath (yellow card) 40'; Topu (yellow card) 90+3'	Stadium: Muktijuddho Sriti Stadium; Referee: Bhubon Mohon Torafder

26 April 2024 13	Rahmatganj MFS	1–2	Fortis FC	Munshigonj
15:45 BST (UTC+6)	Konney 50' (pen.)	Report	Rashed 26'; Pa Omar 37' (penalty missed) 42; Noyon (yellow card) 49'	Stadium: Shaheed Bir Sreshtho Flight Lieutenant Matiur Rahman Stadium; Referee: Md Mizanur Rahman

4 May 2024 14	Fortis FC	1–2	Sheikh Russel KC	Rajshahi
16:00 BST (UTC+6)	Pa Omar 32'; Rashed (yellow card) 35'; Omar (yellow card) 89'	Report	Ganiu 36'; Omar 65' (o.g.); Emon (yellow card) 90+7'	Stadium: Muktijuddho Sriti Stadium; Referee: Joshim Uddin

11 May 2024 15	Brothers Union	1–1	Fortis FC	Rajshahi
16:00 BST (UTC+6)	Touray (yellow card) 34'; Mavlyanov (yellow card) 48'; Noyon 73'	Report	Mona (yellow card) 19'; Sarr 39' (yellow card) 39'; Valeriy (yellow card) 55'; Jumaev (yellow card) 83'	Stadium: Muktijuddho Sriti Stadium; Referee: Alomgir Sarker

18 May 2024 16	Fortis FC	0–0	Sheikh Jamal DC	Rajshahi
16:00 BST (UTC+6)	Farhad (yellow card) 40'; Bappy (yellow card) 90+6'	Report	Shakil (yellow card) 44'; Fahad (yellow card) 76'	Stadium: Muktijuddho Sriti Stadium; Referee: MZF Nahid

24 May 2024 17	Bangladesh Police	1–2	Fortis FC	Mymensingh
16:00 BST (UTC+6)	Morillo (yellow card) 36'; Palacios 90+3' (pen.)	Report	Pa Omar 22' (yellow card) 31'; Valeriy 58'	Stadium: Rafiq Uddin Bhuiyan Stadium; Referee: Md Mizanur Rahman

29 May 2024 18	Fortis FC	3–1	Chittagong Abahani	Rajshahi
16:00 BST (UTC+6)	Omar (yellow card) 31'; Noyon (yellow card) 28'; Rashed (yellow card) 34'; Sarr 45'; Valeriy 71'; Sabuz 82' (yellow card) 83'	Report	Sohanur 58'	Stadium: Muktijuddho Sriti Stadium; Referee: MZF Nahid

=== Independence Cup ===
Pos	Team	Pld	W	D	L	GF	GA	GD	Pts	Qualification
1	Mohammedan SC	2	0	2	0	3	3	0	2	Advance to Knockout stage
2	Bangladesh Army	2	0	2	0	2	2	0	2	Advance to Knockout stage
3	Fortis FC	2	0	2	0	1	1	0	2	

Source: GSA
Rules for classification: Group stage tiebreakers

31 October 2023 1	Fortis FC	0–0	Bangladesh Army	Dhaka
14:30 BST (UTC+6)		Report	Imran (yellow card) 50'	Stadium: Bashundhara Kings Arena; Referee: Bituraj Barua

4 November 2023 2	Fortis FC	1–1	Mohammedan SC	Munshiganj
14:30 BST (UTC+6)	Gryshyn 30'; Farhad (yellow card) 75'	Report	Arif (yellow card) 45+2'; Minhajul 74'	Stadium: Shaheed Bir Sreshtho Flight Lieutenant Matiur Rahman Stadium; Referee: Bhubon Mohon Torafder

=== Federation Cup ===
Pos	Team	Pld	W	D	L	GF	GA	GD	Pts	Qualification
1	Bashundhara Kings	2	2	0	0	2	0	+2	6	Advance to Knockout stage
2	Fortis FC	2	1	0	1	3	2	+1	3	Advance to Knockout stage
3	Sheikh Russel KC	2	0	0	2	1	4	−3	0	Qualified as a best third place team to knockout stage

Source: Soccerway
Rules for classification: Group stages tiebreakers

26 December 2023 1	Bashundhara Kings	1–0	Fortis FC	Gopalganj
14:00 BST (UTC+6)	Dorielton 11'	Report		Stadium: Sheikh Fazlul Haque Mani Stadium; Referee: Md Anisur Rahman Sagor

23 January 2024 2	Sheikh Russel KC	1–3	Fortis FC	Munshigonj
14:45 BST (UTC+6)	Landry 69'	Report	Pa Omar 10' (pen.), 72'; Bappy 51'	Stadium: Shaheed Bir Sreshtho Flight Lieutenant Matiur Rahman Stadium; Referee: Md Alamgir Sarker

==== Knockout stages ====
===== Quarter-final =====
30 March 2024 3	Fortis FC	1–3	Dhaka Abahani	Dhaka
15:00 BST (UTC+6)	Nujum 90+7'	Report	Cornelius 9'; Washington 45+2'; Fernandes 79'	Stadium: Bashundhara Kings; Referee: Md Mizanur Rahman

== Statistics ==
=== Goalscorers ===
Rank	No.	Pos.	Nat.	Player	BPL	Federation Cup	Independence Cup	Total
1	10	FW	(The Gambia)	Pa Omar Babou	6	2	0	8
2	17	FW	(Ukraine)	Valeriy Gryshyn	6	0	1	7
3	31	FW	(The Gambia)	Omar Sarr	4	0	0	4
4	12	FW	(Bangladesh)	Amir Hakim Bappy	0	1	0	1
4	5	DF	(Uzbekistan)	Jasur Jumaev	1	0	0	1
4	16	DF	(Bangladesh)	Rashedul Islam Rashed	1	0	0	1
4	18	MF	(Bangladesh)	Sajed Hasan Jummon Nijum	0	1	0	1
4	4	DF	(Bangladesh)	Sabuz Hossain	1	0	0	1
Own goals (from the opponents)					2	0	0	2
Total					21	4	1	26

Source: Matches
