= 2023–24 BFF U-18 Football League =

2nd professional season of the top-flight youth football league in Bangladesh

BFF U-18 Football League
- Season: 2023–24
- Dates: 22 June–16 July 2024
- Champions: Abahani Limited Dhaka U-18
- Matches: 32
- Goals: 66 (2.06 per match)
- Top goalscorer: Md Yeasin Arafat Sifat Abahani Limited Dhaka U-18 (6 goals)
- Highest scoring: Bashundhara Kings U-18 2–1 Rahmatganj MFS U-18 (22 June 2024)
- Longest winning run: 7 Matches; Abahani Limited Dhaka U-18
- Longest unbeaten run: 3 Matches; Mohammedan SC U-18
- Longest winless run: 5 Matches; Brothers Union U-18
- Longest losing run: 5 Matches; Brothers Union U-18

The 2023–24 BFF U-18 Football League was the 2nd edition of the BFF U-18 Football League, the top division of youth football in Bangladesh. Under 18 teams of 9 Bangladesh Premier League (BPL) clubs were participated in the league. Chittagong Abahani U-18 did not participated in the league due to internal issues.

Abahani Limited Dhaka U-18 is the defending champion having won 2023–24 season title.

== Format ==
The teams would entirely feature U-18 players. The nine team will play right matches again each other in a single round basis. A total of 36 matches will be played. The teams occupying league table positions 1, 2 & 3 will be awarded Champions, Runner-up & Third place prize money. The league does not have a relegation system.

== Venues ==
The league matches were played following these three grounds.

Dhaka
Bashundhara Kings Arena Practice Ground
Capacity: 1,000
Location of the stadiums for the 2023–24 BFF U-18 Football League
Mohammadpur, Dhaka	Uttara, Dhaka
Government Physical Education College Ground	Armed Police Battalion Field Ground
Capacity: 5,000	Capacity: 2,000

== Teams ==
The following nine participants were contested in the league.

Team	Head coach	Captain
Bangladesh Police FC U-18	(Bangladesh) Md Mahbubul Haque	(Bangladesh) Md Shorif Uddin Nirob
Bashundhara Kings U-18	(Bangladesh) Syed Golam Jilani	(Bangladesh) Md Delowar Hossan Nehal
Dhaka Abahani U-18	(Bangladesh) Md Shamim Khan Miskin	(Bangladesh) Md Yeasin Arafat Sifat
Dhaka Mohammedan U-18	(Bangladesh) Md Sayeduz Zaman Shamim	(Bangladesh) Shahriar Ansari
Lt.Sheikh Jamal Dhanmondi Club Limited U-18	(Bangladesh) Obaidur Rahman	(Bangladesh) Md Mohin Ahammad
Rahmatganj MFS U-18	(Bangladesh) Kamal Babu	(Bangladesh) Md Delwar Hossen
Sheikh Russel KC U-18	(Bangladesh) Shahedul Alam Shahed	(Bangladesh) Md Apon Shorker
Fortis FC U-18	(Bangladesh) Touhid Siddique	(Bangladesh) Swe Mong Sing Marma
Brothers Union U-18	(Bangladesh) Md Sabbir Ahamed Palash	(Bangladesh) Md Onik

== Standings ==
=== League table ===
Pos	Team	Pld	W	D	L	GF	GA	GD	Pts	Qualification or relegation
1	Dhaka Abahani U-18	7	7	0	0	16	4	+12	21	Champions
2	Fortis FC U-18	7	5	1	1	9	4	+5	16	Runner-ups
3	Sheikh Russel KC U-18	7	3	2	2	4	2	+2	11	
4	Bashundhara Kings U-18	7	3	1	3	10	5	+5	10	
5	Bangladesh Police FC U-18	7	2	2	3	6	8	−2	8	
6	Dhaka Mohammedan U-18	7	1	4	2	5	6	−1	7	
7	Sheikh Jamal DC U-18	7	1	4	2	7	8	−1	7	
8	Rahmatganj MFS U-18	8	2	1	5	6	14	−8	7	
9	Brothers Union U-18	7	0	1	6	3	15	−12	1	

Source: BFF

== Results ==
No Home \ No Away	BPFC U-18	BK U-18	DAL U-18	MSC U-18	SJDC U-18	FFC U-18	RAH U-18	SRKC U-18	BUL U-18
Bangladesh Police FC U-18	—	0–2		Postponed	1–1	1–2	2–1		
Bashundhara Kings U-18		—	1–2	0–0			2–1	0–1	
Dhaka Abahani U-18	1–0		—	3–1		2–0			2–0
Mohammedan SC U-18				—				0–0	3–1
Sheikh Jamal DC U-18		Postponed	1–2	1–1	—	1–2	1–1		
Fortis FC U-18		1–0		0–0		—			
Rahmatganj MFS U-18			1–4	1–0		0–3	—	0–2	1–0
Sheikh Russel KC U-18	0–0		Postponed		0–1	0–1		—	
Brothers Union U-18	1–2	0–5			1–1	Postponed		0–1	—

Source: BFF
Legend: Blue = left column team win; Yellow = draw; Red = top row team win.

== Positions by round ==
The following table lists the positions of teams after each week of matches. In order to preserve the chronological evolution, any postponed matches are not included to the round at which they were originally scheduled but added to the full round they were played immediately afterward.

Team ╲ Round	1	2	3	4	5	6	7	8	9
Abahani Ltd. Dhaka U-18	1	1	1	1	1	1	1	1	–
Bangladesh Police FC U-18	3	5	2	4	7	4	5	5	–
Bashundhara Kings U-18	2	2	5	3	3	3	3	4	–
Brothers Union U-18	7	9	9	9	9	9	9	9	–
Fortis FC U-18	9	4	4	2	2	2	2	2	–
Mohammedan SC U-18	4	7	7	6	4	5	6	6	–
Rahmatganj MFS U-18	8	3	6	7	8	6	8	8	–
Sheikh Jamal DC U-18	5	8	3	5	6	8	7	7	–
Sheikh Russel KC U-18	6	6	8	8	5	7	4	3	–

Leader
Runners-up

Source: BFF

== Results by games ==
Team ╲ Round	1	2	3	4	5	6	7	8	9
Abahani Ltd. Dhaka U-18	W	W	W	W	–	W	W	W	P
Bangladesh Police FC U-18	D	D	W	L	L	W	–	L	P
Bashundhara Kings U-18	W	L	–	W	W	L	L	D	P
Brothers Union U-18	–	L	L	L	L	L	D	L	P
Fortis FC U-18	L	W	D	W	W	W	W	–	P
Mohammedan SC U-18	D	–	D	D	W	L	L	D	P
Rahmatganj MFS U-18	L	D	L	L	L	W	L	D	P
Sheikh Jamal DC U-18	D	L	W	D	L	–	D	D	P
Sheikh Russel KC U-18	D	D	L	–	W	L	W	W	P

Source: BFF
W = Win; D = Draw; L = Lose; P = Postponed

== Season statistics ==
=== Goalscorers ===
There have been 66 goals scored in 32 matches, for an average of 2.06 goals per match.

6 goals

- (Bangladesh) Md Yeasin Arafat Sifat (Abahani Limited Dhaka U-18)

3 goals

- Zuhan Ajher (Bangladesh Police FC U-18)
- (Bangladesh) Md Abdullah Noman Dipu (Abahani Limited Dhaka U-18)
- (Bangladesh) Md Abdur Rahim (Fortis FC U-18)
- (Bangladesh) Md Delwar Hossen (Rahmatganj MFS U-18)

2 goals

- (Bangladesh) Md Bappy Hossain (Sheikh Jamal DC U-18)
- (Bangladesh) Mohammad Shofiq Rahman (Bashundhara Kings U-18)
- Mohammad Yasin (Bangladesh Police FC U-18)
- (Bangladesh) Md Yasin (Bashundhara Kings U-18)
- (Bangladesh) Sheikh Md Imran Yousuf (Mohammedan SC U-18)
- (Bangladesh) Md Tuhin Miah (Mohammedan SC U-18)
- (Bangladesh) Swe Mong Sing Marma (Fortis FC U-18)
- (Bangladesh) Samuel Raksam (Abahani Limited Dhaka U-18)
- (Bangladesh) Md Onik (Brothers Union U-18)
- (Bangladesh) Md Mohin Ahammad (Sheikh Jamal DC U-18)
- (Bangladesh) Md Ariful Islam (Sheikh Jamal DC U-18)

1 goal

- (Bangladesh) Hridoy Khalifa (Sheikh Jamal DC U-18)
- (Bangladesh) Md Asad Bhuiyan (Bashundhara Kings U-18)
- (Bangladesh) Nur Alam Khan (Abahani Limited Dhaka U-18)
- (Bangladesh) Md Musa (Abahani Limited Dhaka U-18)
- Md Rabiul Alif Sani (Bangladesh Police FC U-18)
- (Bangladesh) Md Nabidul Islam (Rahmatganj MFS U-18)
- (Bangladesh) Mohammad Sadek (Rahmatganj MFS U-18)
- (Bangladesh) Mahedi Hasan (Abahani Limited Dhaka U-18)
- (Bangladesh) Sakib Hasan Rony (Abahani Limited Dhaka U-18)
- (Bangladesh) Md Raihan Uddin (Brothers Union U-18)
- (Bangladesh) Md Emon Babu Jibon (Bashundhara Kings U-18)
- (Bangladesh) Md Raisul Islam Rahid (Bashundhara Kings U-18)
- (Bangladesh) Md Ratul Hasan (Bashundhara Kings U-18)
- (Bangladesh) Anisur Sheikh (Bashundhara Kings U-18)
- (Bangladesh) Md Santo (Fortis FC U-18)
- Md Sonet Shek (Bangladesh Police FC U-18)
- (Bangladesh) Rafiul Islam (Sheikh Russel KC U-18)
- (Bangladesh) Jomou Marma (Sheikh Russel KC U-18)
- (Bangladesh) Md Ibrahim Mia (Fortis FC U-18)
- (Bangladesh) Md Robiul Islam (Brothers Union U-18)
- (Bangladesh) Md Abu Sayed (Bashundhara Kings U-18)
- (Bangladesh) Md Sazid Ahammed (Mohammedan SC)
- (Bangladesh) Md Milon Hosen (Abahani Limited Dhaka U-18)
- (Bangladesh) Md Sabbir Hossaen (Sheikh Russel KC U-18)

Source: BFF

== See also ==
- 2024–25 Bangladesh Premier League (football)
- 2023-24 BFF U-16 Football Tournament
- 2023–24 Dhaka Senior Division League
