= Joseph Nur Rahman =

Bangladeshi footballer (born 1986)

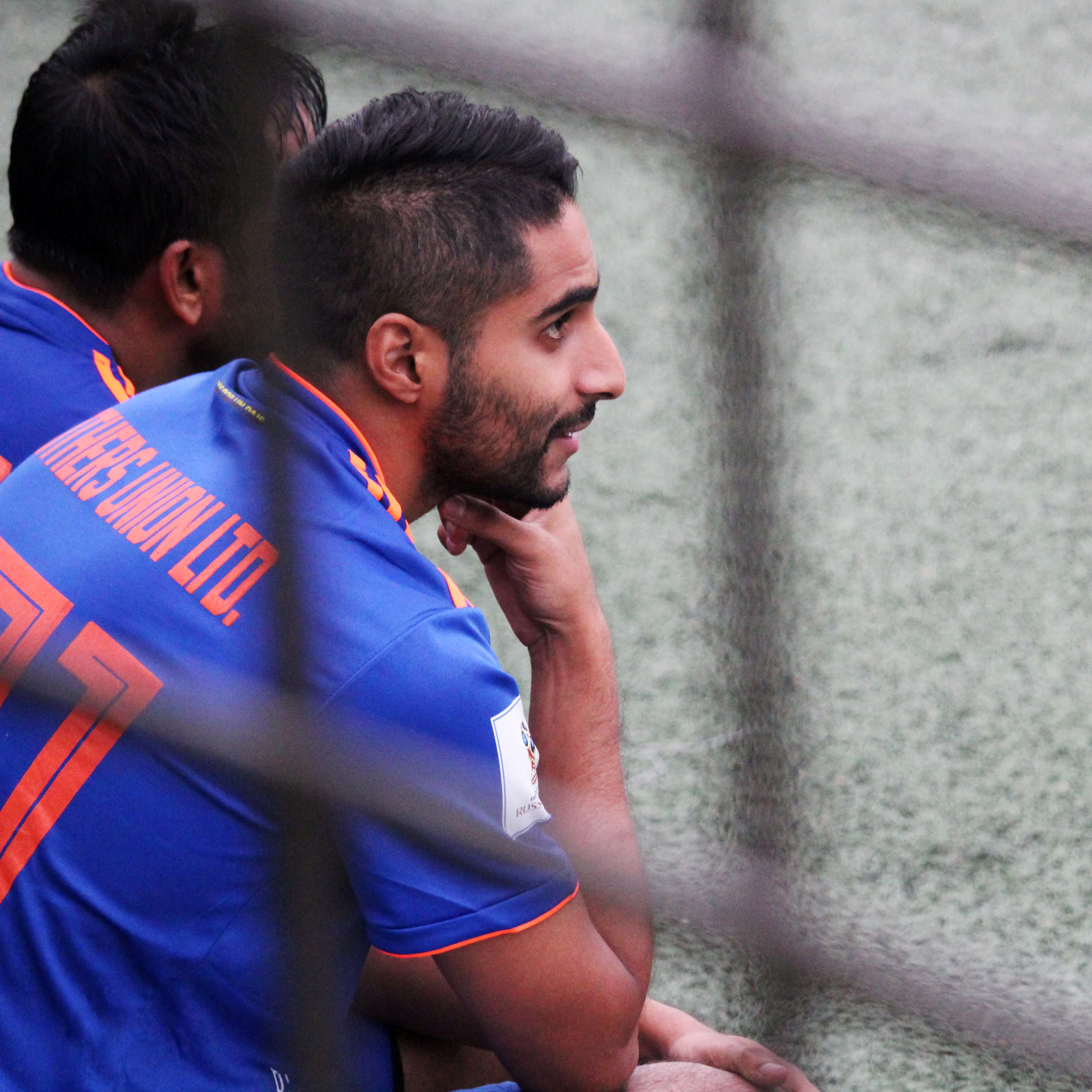
- Joseph with Bangladesh Police in 2018

Personal information
- Full name: Joseph Nur Rahman
- Date of birth: 25 December 1986 (age 39)
- Place of birth: Uppsala, Sweden
- Height: 1.77 m (5 ft 10 in)
- Position: Attacking midfielder

Senior career*
Years	Team	Apps	(Gls)
2009–10	Gamlis FF		
2010	Kungsängens IF		
2010–12	Uppsala Kurd FK		
2012–15	Procyon BK		
2016–17	Sheikh Jamal DC	2	(0)
2017–19	Brothers Union	12	(0)
2019–20	Bangladesh Police	0	(0)
2020	Vaksala IK		
2020–21	Brothers Union	8	(1)
2021–22	Fortis	1	(0)
2023–24	Fortis	0	(0)
2024–25	Brothers Union	0	(0)
- * Club domestic league appearances and goals as of 29 May 2024

Joseph Nur Rahman (Bengali: জোসেফ নূর রহমান; born 25 December 1986) is a professional footballer who plays as an attacking midfleder. He last played for Bangladesh Premier League club Brothers Union.

== Personal life ==
Joseph's father, Shafiqur Rahman, is from Comilla and his mother, Nargis Rahman, is from Brahmanbaria.

== Career ==
Born in Uppsala, Sweden, Joseph began his career with local club Gamlis FF in 2009. In 2015, while playing for Procyon BK in the Swedish fifth division, Joseph came to Bangladesh to attend trials for the Bangladesh national team for the 2018 FIFA World Cup qualifiers. Although he impressed coach, Fabio Lopez, he was not added to the final squad as Lopez deemed he did not have time to add new players to the squad. Before returning to Sweden, Joseph was assured that he would be recalled to the national camp for the 2015 SAFF Championship.

In 2016, Joseph joined Sheikh Jamal Dhanmondi Club in the Bangladesh Premier League after failing two national trials. He was included in the squad for the 2016 AFC Cup, however, failed to make an appearance. On 21 August 2017, he made his Premier League debut during a 3–1 victory over Arambagh KS. Due to continuous injuries, Joseph departed the club and after a month long stint with Bangladesh Police FC he joined Vaksala SK in Sweden's fifth division in June 2020.

Joseph returned to Bangladesh by joining Brothers Union in the Premier League in December 2020. On 14 February 2021, he scored his first goal in Bangladesh against Mohammedan SC in a 2–1 defeat during a league fixture. In 2022, he joined Fortis FC in Bangladesh's second-tier, the Bangladesh Championship League. He only managed to make one appearance as Fortis secured the league title along with promotion, suffering a major injury following his debut against Gopalganj SC on 20 February 2022. While injured he worked as a junior coach in the Fortis FC Academy.

== Honours ==
Fortis FC

- Bangladesh Championship League: 2021–22
