= Chittagong Abahani Reserves and Youth =

Bangladeshi football club

Chittagong Abahani Under-18
- Full name: Chittagong Abahani Limited Under-18
- Nicknames: Blue Pirates (Bengali: ব্লু পাইরেটস)
- Short name: CAL
- Founded: 2014; 11 years ago
- Ground: various
- President: M. Abdul Latif
- Head Coach: Shaidul Alam Bulbul
- League: BFF U-18 Football League
- 2021–22: 8th of 11
colours	colours

Chittagong Abahani Reserves and Youth are the reserve team and youth system of the Chittagong based Bangladesh Premier League club Chittagong Abahani Ltd. The youth system consist of an under-18 men's team that currently competes in the BFF U18 Football League, the top-tier league of youth football system in Bangladesh organised by the Bangladesh Football Federation. The under-18 team previously used to play in BFF U-18 Football Tournament. The reserve team, named as Chittagong Abahani Junior, competes in the CJKS-CDFA Second Division Football League, the third-tier football league of Chittagong football.

== U-18 team ==
=== Current squad ===
The under-18 squad for 2021–22 season.

As of August 2022

Note: Flags indicate national team as defined under FIFA eligibility rules; some limited exceptions apply. Players may hold more than one non-FIFA nationality.

No.	Pos.	Nation	Player
1	GK	BAN	Bikash Das
2	DF	BAN	Mosharaf Hossain
3	DF	BAN	Rakibul Islam Rocky
4	DF	BAN	Abdul Nur Alam Apu
5	DF	BAN	Noyan Mia
6	MF	BAN	Sajjad Hossain Mijan
7	MF	BAN	Abrar Fahim
8	MF	BAN	Rahul Ahammad Rahad
9	FW	BAN	Ariful Islam
10	FW	BAN	Abdu Rahman
11	MF	BAN	Sabbir Hossain
12	MF	BAN	Uthaileng Marma
13	MF	BAN	Shafayet Hossain

No.	Pos.	Nation	Player
14	MF	BAN	Jamshed Miya
15	MF	BAN	Abu Wahidul Islam
16	MF	BAN	Mijanul Haque
17	FW	BAN	Riad Hosen Rabbi
18	DF	BAN	Abdul Mojid
19	DF	BAN	Sheikh Sadi Chowdhury
20	FW	BAN	Shahdat Hossain
21	MF	BAN	Soykat Chakma
22	GK	BAN	Shahariar Sarwar Alfi
23	MF	BAN	Saikat Barua
24	DF	BAN	Sazzad Hossain Shakib
25	GK	BAN	Sayad Hossen Piblu
26	DF	BAN	MD. Arfat

== Season to season (U-18) ==
=== BFF U-18 Football Tournament ===
: :Season: :	Position	Top scorer(s)	Notes
2014	unknown	unknown	
2018	unknown	unknown	
2019	Quarter-final	Shek Jamal (3)	

=== BFF U-18 Football League ===
: :Season: :	Pld	W	D	L	GF	GA	Win%	Position	Notes
2021–22	10	3	1	6	16	15	33.33	8th of 11	

== Reserves ==
The reserve team, officially known as Chittagong Abahani Limited Junior, competes in the regional league system of Chittagong. It currently competes in CJKS-CDFA Second Division Football League, the third tier regional league of Chittagong. The team, sometimes referred as Abahani Limited Junior or simply as Abahani Junior, playing in the regional league since 2003–2004. The squad of the reserve team built with the local players of Chittagong.
