= Qazi Abdul Alim =

- কাজী আবদুল আলীম
- Born: 31 December 1933; Dhaka, Bengal Presidency, British India
- Died: 25 August 2007 (aged 73); Dhaka, Bangladesh
- Education: University of Dhaka; University of Oregon
- Occupations: Athlete, writer

Qazi Abdul Alim (31 December 1933 – 25 August 2007) was a Bangladeshi athlete and sports organiser. He won the Provincial Athletics Championship for nine consecutive years from 1948 to 1956 and athletics meet of Salimullah Muslim Hall at the University of Dhaka for seven consecutive years, from 1950 to 1956. He was awarded Independence Day Award in 1993 by the Government of Bangladesh for his contribution to sports.

== Early life and education ==
Abdul Alim was born to Qazi Badri and Mahsuda Begum in Dhaka. He had three sisters: Qazi Zaheda, Qazi Nasima and Qazi Shamima. He studied in St. Gregory's High School and K.L. Jubilee School before completing his matriculation from Dhaka Collegiate School. He completed his intermediate examination from Jagannath College. In 1949, he enrolled in the University of Dhaka for his bachelor's degree. From the same university, he then earned his two master's degrees in international relations in 1954 and history in 1956. In 1956, he was awarded an Asia Foundation scholarship to attend The University of Oregon to earn a bachelor's degree in physical education.

== Athletic career ==
Abdul Alim broke the Pakistan pole vault record in 1951. He was the captain of the University of Dhaka Athletic Team participated in the provincial meet from 1950 to 1956 and the captain of East Pakistan contingent in the national games in 1955 and 1956.

== Managerial career ==
Abdul Alim started his career as a professional athletics coach. Pakistan Olympic Association employed him as a national coach from 1958 to 1962. He worked as the director of physical education in the Mymensingh Agricultural University (later Bangladesh Agricultural University) during 1962 –1965. He was manager and coach of athletics of former East Pakistan contingent from 1962 to 1967. He joined the National Sports Training and Coaching Center, Dhaka as its director during March 1965 – February 1974.

In 1974, he was appointed the principal of Dhaka Physical Education College. He worked for the college again during 1982–1989. In 1979, he became the founding director of Bangladesh Institute of Sports (later became Bangladesh Krira Shikkha Protishtan). In 1994, he represented Bangladesh as Deputy Chief-de-Mission in the Hiroshima Asian Games and the Dhaka SAAF Games.

Abdul Alim wrote 42 books - 18 of which are in physical education.

== Personal life ==
In 1961, Abdul Alim married Qazi Selima. Together they had three sons.

== Awards and nominations ==
- UNESCO Official Award for Physical Education and Sports for Asia-Pacific (2004)
- Deshbandhu CR Das Gold Medal (2002)
- Independence Day Award (1993)
- National Sports Awards (1977)
