= Joseph Afusi =

Nigerian footballer and coach (born 1982)

Personal information
- Full name: Joseph Chukwuemeka Afusi
- Date of birth: 11 November 1982 (age 44)
- Place of birth: Nigeria
- Height: 1.90 m (6 ft 3 in)
- Position: Striker

Senior career*
Years	Team	Apps	(Gls)
2000–03	Gabros International	45	(23)
2003–05	Al-Najma Club Bahrain	38	(27)
2005	AEL Limassol	18	(12)
2006	FC Bulle	14	(9)
2006	CS Chênois	10	(14)
2006–2007	FC Baden	24	(19)
2007–2008	Zug 94	26	(18)
2008	FC Solothurn	24	(16)
2008–2009	Ceahlăul Piatra Neamţ	26	(22)
2009–2010	CS Buftea	18	(12)
2010	Minerul Lupeni	26	(14)
2010–2011	Ramsgate	10	(6)
2011–2012	Sheikh Jamal DC	12	(7)
Total		291	(199)

Managerial career
- 2012–2014: Sheikh Jamal DC
- 2014–2015: Churchill Brothers
- 2015: Sheikh Jamal DC (player–manager)
- 2016: Churchill Brothers
- 2017: Sheikh Jamal DC
- 2018: Churchill Brothers (technical director)
- 2018–2019: Sheikh Jamal DC
- 2022: Sheikh Jamal DC
- * Club domestic league appearances and goals

Joseph Afusi (born 11 November 1982) is a Nigerian football coach and former player, who was most recently the Head coach of Bangladesh Premier League club Sheikh Jamal Dhanmondi Club.

== Playing career ==
=== Early career ===
He played for Sheikh Jamal Dhanmondi Club, FC Baden, Zug 94, FC Solothurn, Ceahlăul Piatra Neamţ, CS Buftea, and Minerul Lupeni.

== Honours ==
=== As a Player ===
FC Ceahlăul Piatra Neamț : Liga II

- Winners (1): 2008–09

Sheikh Jamal Dhanmondi Club

- Bangladesh Premier League (1)

2010–11

=== As a Manager ===
Sheikh Jamal Dhanmondi Club

- Bangladesh Premier League (2)

2013–14, 2014–15

- Federation Cup (1)

2013-14
