= Sabuz Hossain =

Bangladeshi footballer

Personal information
- Full name: Mohamed Sabuz Hossain
- Date of birth: 23 July 2002 (age 24)
- Place of birth: Kushtia, Bangladesh
- Height: 1.78 m (5 ft 10 in)
- Positions: Right-back; center-back

Team information
- Current team: Dhaka Abahani
- Number: 44

Youth career
- 2017: Asaduzzaman FA
- 2018–2019: Saif SC Jr.

Senior career*
Years	Team	Apps	(Gls)
2019–2022	Saif SC	18	(1)
2022–2024	Fortis	32	(1)
2024–	Dhaka Abahani	0	(0)
- * Club domestic league appearances and goals as of 29 May 2024

Sabuz Hossain (Bengali: সবুজ হোসেন; born 23 July 2002) is a Bangladeshi professional footballer who plays as a defender for Bangladesh Premier League club Abahani Limited Dhaka.

== Early life ==
Sabuz was born in Kushtia, Bangladesh, to Nawsher Hossain and Shahida Begum. His father, Nawsher Hossain, a Rickshaw puller, was the family's main provider. Sabuz began his career with Magura based Asaduzzaman Football Academy and captained them during the 2017 Pioneer Football League.

== Club career ==
=== Saif Sporting Club ===
In 2017, Sabuz joined Saif Sporting Club Youth Team on a 5-year contract. Under coach Kamal Babu he participated in the 2018 Dhaka Third Division League. On 20 April 2018, he scored his first goal for the youth team in a 3–2 victory over Tangail Football Academy. In 2019, he participated in the Swami Vivekananda Championship Night Football Tournament in India. In the same year, Sabuz was part of the Saif team that finished runners-up in the 2019 BFF U-18 Football Tournament.

On 27 November 2019, Sabuz was promoted to the senior team. He made his comepetitive debut for the club on 6 February 2021, during a league fixture against Arambagh KS. On 3 July 2022, he scored his first professional league goal during a 4–2 victory over Abahani Limited Dhaka.

=== Fortis FC ===
In August 2022, Sabuz joined newly promoted Premier League club, Fortis FC. On 7 February 2023, he scored his first goal for the club against Muktijoddha Sangsad during a 1–2 defeat in the 2022–23 Federation Cup.

== International career ==
In 2021, Sabuz travelled to Uzbekistan to participate in the 2022 AFC U-23 Asian Cup qualifiers. However, he failed to make his debut for the Bangladesh U23 team during the qualifiers. He returned to the team in 2023, for the 2024 AFC U-23 Asian Cup qualifiers in Thailand.

== Career statistics ==
=== Club ===
As of 3 June 2023.

Club	Season	League			Domestic Cup (Note: Appearance(s) in Bangladesh Federation Cup)		Other (Note: Appearance(s) in Bangladesh Independence Cup)		Continental		Total	
Club	Season	Division	Apps	Goals	Apps	Goals	Apps	Goals	Apps	Goals	Apps	Goals
Saif SC
Saif SC	2019–20	Bangladesh Premier League	0	0	0	0	—		—		0	0
Saif SC	2020–21	Bangladesh Premier League	11	0	0	0	—		—		11	0
Saif SC	2021–22	Bangladesh Premier League	7	1	0	0	0	0	—		7	1
Saif SC	Saif SC total		18	1	0	0	0	0	0	0	18	1
Fortis	2022–23	Bangladesh Premier League	16	0	2	1	0	0	—		18	1
Fortis	2023–24	Bangladesh Premier League	0	0	0	0	0	0	—		0	0
Career total			49	2	2	1	0	0	0	0	51	3
