= Atiqur Rahman Meshu =

Bangladeshi footballer

Personal information
- Full name: Atiqur Rahman Meshu
- Date of birth: 26 August 1988 (age 38)
- Place of birth: Kishoreganj, Bangladesh
- Height: 1.77 m (5 ft 10 in)
- Positions: Left-back; left winger

Team information
- Current team: Brothers Union (assistant)

Senior career*
Years	Team	Apps	(Gls)
2007–2009	Brothers Union		
2009–2010	Dhaka Abahani		
2010–2011	Sheikh Jamal DC		
2011–2012	Brothers Union		
2012–2014	Dhaka Abahani		(2)
2015–2018	Sheikh Russel KC		
2018–2019	Mohammedan SC	21	(0)
2019–2021	Dhaka Abahani	1	(0)
2021	Brothers Union	2	(0)

International career^{‡}
2010–2014	Bangladesh U23	10	(1)
2007–2016	Bangladesh	36	(2)

Managerial career
- 2021–2022: Fortis (assistant)
- 2022–2024: Fortis Academy
- 2024: Bangladesh U17 (assistant)
- 2024–2025: Brothers Union (assistant)
- 2025: Bangladesh U23 (assistant)
- 2026–: Bangladesh U20 (assistant)
Medal record
Representing Bangladesh U-23
South Asian Games
Gold medal – first place	2010
- * Club domestic league appearances and goals as of 4 May 2021 ‡ National team caps and goals as of 10 December 2016

Atiqur Rahman Meshu (Bengali: আতিকুর রহমান মিশু; born 26 August 1988) is a Bangladeshi football coach and former player. He represented the Bangladesh national team between 2007 and 2016.

== International career ==
On 24 August 2007, Meshu made his Bangladesh national team debut against Kyrgyzstan in the 2007 Nehru Cup, held in New Delhi, India.

On 16 February 2010, he scored his first international goal during a 2–1 victory over Tajikistan in the 2010 AFC Challenge Cup. On 3 September 2013, he scored his second international goal during a 1–1 draw with India in the 2013 SAFF Championship.

He was also part of the Bangladesh U23 team which won gold in the 2010 South Asian Games. He remained an integral member of the olympic team during both the 2010 Asian Games and 2012 Summer Olympics. However, an injury sustained before the 2014 Asian Games affected his form for both club and country.

== Playing style ==
Meshu was a versatile player who played as left back, right back, center back, and also as a defensive midfielder, throughout his career which lasted for more than a decade.

== Honours ==
Abahani Limited Dhaka

- Bangladesh Premier League: 2009–10, 2012
- Federation Cup: 2010

Sheikh Jamal Dhanmondi Club

- Bangladesh Premier League: 2010–11
- Pokhara Cup: 2010

Bangladesh U23

- South Asian Games Gold medal: 2010
