= BFF U-18 Football League =

Youth football league in Bangladesh

- Logo of 2021–22 season
- Founded: 15 September 2022; 3 years ago
- Country: Bangladesh
- Confederation: AFC
- Number of clubs: 9
- Level on pyramid: 1
- Current champions: Dhaka Abahani U-18 (1 title) (2023–24)
- Most championships: Dhaka Abahani U-18; Sheikh Jamal DC U-18 (1 title each)
- Website: www.bff.com.bd
- Current: 2023–24 BFF U-18 Football League

The BFF U-18 Football League is the top level of the Bangladeshi football league system for youth players under 18 years old where youth teams of Bangladesh Premier League teams compete in. Established in 2022, it is administered by the Bangladesh Football Federation (BFF).

The league replaces the BFF U-18 Football Tournament as the top-tier youth football competition. A total of 12 youth teams compete in a single league format.

== History ==
In September 2022, Bangladesh Football Federation (BFF) inaugurated the first youth football league for the clubs in the country's top-tier football league, the Bangladesh Premier League (BPL). The league is eligible for players under 18 years old.

== Format ==
The teams would entirely feature U-18 players. The ten teams will play nine matches against each other in a single round league format. A total of 45 matches will be played. The teams occupying league table positions 1, 2 & 3 will be awarded Champions, Runner-up & Third place prize money. The league does not have a relegation system as of the first season.

== Champions ==
=== Successful clubs by seasons ===
Edition	Season	Champions	Runners–up	Ref.
1st	2021–22	Sheikh Jamal DC U-18	Bashundhara Kings U-18	
2nd	2023–24	Dhaka Abahani U-18	Fortis FC U-18	

=== Performance by clubs ===
Club	Titles	Runners–up	Winning seasons	Runners–up seasons
Sheikh Jamal DC U-18	1		2021–22	
Bashundhara Kings U-18		1		2021–22
Dhaka Abahani U-18	1		2023–24	
Fortis FC U-18		1		2023–24

== Current teams ==
As of 2023–24 season.

Team	Location
Bangladesh Police FC	Dhaka
Bashundhara Kings	Dhaka
Brothers Union	Dhaka
Dhaka Abahani	Dhaka (Dhanmondi)
Mohammedan SC	Dhaka
Lt. Sheikh Jamal Dhanmondi Club Ltd.	Dhaka (Dhanmondi)
Fortis FC	Dhaka
Rahmatganj MFS	Dhaka (Old Dhaka)
Sheikh Russel KC	Dhaka

== Stats and players ==
=== Seasonal statistics ===
As of 16 July 2024

Season	Total Goals	Matches played	Average per Game
2021–22	160	55	2.91
2023–24	66	32	2.06

=== Top scorers ===
As of 16 July 2024

Year	Player	Club	Goals	Ref.
2021–22	(Bangladesh) Naymul Talukdar	Muktijoddha SKC U-18	11	
2023–24	(Bangladesh) Md Yeasin Arafat Sifat	Abahani Limited Dhaka U-18	6	

== Awards ==
=== Player of the Season ===
Season	Player	Team
2021–22	(Bangladesh) Mr. Joy Dash	Sheikh Jamal U-18

== See also ==
- BFF U-18 Football Tournament
- BFF U-16 Football Tournament
- Football in Bangladesh
