= 2019 BFF U-18 Football Tournament =

Tournament details
- Country: Bangladesh
- Dates: 13 September – 2 October 2019
- Teams: 12

Final positions
- Champions: NoFeL Sporting Club U-18 (1st title)
- Runners-up: Saif Sporting Club U-18

Tournament statistics
- Matches played: 19
- Goals scored: 55 (2.89 per match)
- Attendance: 8,715 (459 per match)
- Top goal scorer(s): 3 Goals (Bangladesh) Rahul (Arambagh KS U-18) (Bangladesh) Jamal (Chittagong Abahani U-18) (Bangladesh) Iqbal (Dhaka Abahani U-18) (Bangladesh) Sabbir Hossain (Bashundhara Kings U-18) (Bangladesh) Arman Hossain Abir (NoFeL Sporting Club)

Awards
- Best player: Rashedul Islam (Bashundhara Kings U-18)

The 2019 BFF U-18 Football Tournament (also known as Walton U-18 Football Tournament for sponsorship reason), It was the 3rd edition of BFF U-18 Football Tournament, a youth club football tournament in Bangladesh hosted by the Bangladesh Football Federation.The main goal of this tournament to produce future football players for Bangladesh national football team and clubs.

== Draw ==
The draw ceremony were held at BFF house at Motijheel, Dhaka on 31 July 2019. The 12 teams were divided into 4 groups. Top two teams from each group will qualified for Quarter-finals.

Group A	Group B	Group C	Group D
Chittagong Abahani U-18; Brothers Union U-18; Muktijoddha Sangsad U-18	Sheikh Jamal Dhanmondi Club U-18; Arambagh KS U-18; Rahmatganj MFS U-18	Bashundhara Kings U-18; Dhaka Abahani U-18; Dhaka Mohammedan U-18	Saif SC U-18; Sheikh Russel KC U-18; NoFeL Sporting Club U-18

== Round matches dates ==
Phase	Date
Group Stages	13-18 September 2019
Quarter-finals	20-23 September 2019
Semi-finals	26-27 September 2019
Final	2 October 2019

== Venue ==
Dhaka
Bangabandhu National Stadium
Capacity: 36,000

- Note:The final match venue have shifted to BSSSM Mostafa Kamal Stadium due to bad surface of Bangabandhu National Stadium.

== Officials ==
Referres

- (Bangladesh) Bovon Mohon Talukdar
- (Bangladesh) Md Jalaluddin
- (Bangladesh) Iqbal Alam
- (Bangladesh) Shohrab Hossain
- (Bangladesh) Mizanur Rahman
- (Bangladesh) Osman Gani
- (Bangladesh) Shafiqul Islam Imon
- (Bangladesh) Ahmed Gordow
- (Bangladesh) G. Chawdhury Nayan
- (Bangladesh) Fareed Ahmed

== Group stage ==
- All matches will be played at Dhaka, Bangladesh.
- Times listed are UTC+6:00.

Key to colours in group tables
Group winners and Runners-up advance to the Quarter-finals

=== Group A ===
Pos	Team	Pld	W	D	L	GF	GA	GD	Pts	Qualification
1	Brothers Union U-18	2	2	0	0	5	2	+3	6	Knockout stage
2	Chittagong Abahani U-18	2	1	0	1	6	2	+4	3	Knockout stage
3	Muktijoddha Sangsad KC U-18	2	0	0	2	1	8	−7	0	

Source: BFF

13 September 2019
19:00 BST

Chittagong Abahani U-18	5–0	Muktijoddha Sangsad KC U-18
Rasel 10'; Jamal 20', 39', 45' (pen.); Ibrahim 86'	Report

Bangabandhu National Stadium, Dhaka
Attendance: 200
Referee: Bovon Mohon Talukdar (Bangladesh)

15 September 2019
18:30 BST

Muktijoddha Sangsad KC U-18	1–3	Brothers Union U-18
Touhid 50'	Report	Jalal 2'; Rashed 70'; Minhajul 90'

Bangabandhu National Stadium, Dhaka
Attendance: 620
Referee: Osman Gani (Bangladesh)

17 September 2019
16:00 BST

Brothers Union U-18	2–1	Chittagong Abahani U-18
Ashiqul 26'; Habibur 55'	Report	Fahim 81'

Bangabandhu National Stadium, Dhaka
Attendance: 400
Referee: G. Chawdhury Nayan (Bangladesh)

=== Group B ===
Pos	Team	Pld	W	D	L	GF	GA	GD	Pts	Qualification
1	Arambagh KS U-18	2	2	0	0	4	0	+4	6	Knockout stage
2	Sheikh Jamal DC U-18	2	1	0	1	5	0	+5	3	Knockout stage
3	Rahmatganj MFS U-18	2	0	0	2	0	8	−8	0	

Source: bdnews24

14 September 2019
16:00 BST

Sheikh Jamal Dhanmondi Club U-18	5–0	Rahmatganj MFS U-18
Badhon 13', 65'; Rabbi 21'; Milon 55'; Jihan 83'	Report

Bangabandhu National Stadium, Dhaka
Attendance: 500
Referee: Iqbal Alam (Bangladesh)

16 September 2019
16:00 BST

Rahmatganj MFS U-18	0–3	Arambagh KS U-18
	Report	Akash (55(pen.)); Rahul 72', 83'

Bangabandhu National Stadium, Dhaka
Attendance: 200
Referee: Bovon Mohon Talukdar (Bangladesh)

18 September 2019
18:30 BST

Arambagh KS U-18	1–0	Sheikh Jamal Dhanmondi Club U-18
Rahul Talukdar 53'	Report

Bangabandhu National Stadium, Dhaka
Attendance: 500
Referee: Jalaluddin (Bangladesh)

=== Group C ===
Pos	Team	Pld	W	D	L	GF	GA	GD	Pts	Qualification
1	Dhaka Abahani U-18	2	1	1	0	5	1	+4	4	Knockout stage
2	Bashundhara Kings U-18	2	1	1	0	3	0	+3	4	Knockout stage
3	Dhaka Mohammedan U-18	2	0	0	2	1	8	−7	0	

Source: BFF

14 September 2019
18:30 BST

Dhaka Abahani U-18	0–0	Bashundhara Kings U-18
	Report

Bangabandhu National Stadium, Dhaka
Attendance: 1250
Referee: Jalaluddin (Bangladesh)

16 September 2019
18:30 BST

Bashundhara Kings U-18	3-0	Dhaka Mohammedan U-18
Sabbir Hossain 51'; Rahan Bepari 63'; Shuvo Rajbongshi 70'	Report

Bangabandhu National Stadium, Dhaka
Attendance: 250
Referee: Shohrab Hossain (Bangladesh)

18 September 2019
16:00 BST

Dhaka Abahani U-18	5–1	Dhaka Mohammedan U-18
Iqbal 17', 58', 68'; Rakib 24'; Sakir 28'	Report	Imran 43' (pen.)

Bangabandhu National Stadium, Dhaka
Attendance: 400
Referee: Mizanur Rahman (Bangladesh)

=== Group D ===
Pos	Team	Pld	W	D	L	GF	GA	GD	Pts	Qualification
1	Saif Sporting Club U-18	2	1	1	0	4	1	+3	4	Knockout stage
2	NoFeL Sporting Club U-18	2	1	1	0	3	1	+2	4	Knockout stage
3	Sheikh Russel KC U-18	2	0	0	2	0	5	−5	0	

Source: Jagonews

13 September 2019
16:30 BST

Saif Sporting Club U-18	1–1	NoFeL Sporting Club U-18
Saniyat Hasan Sahad 31' (pen.)	Report	Mezbah 49'

Bangabandhu National Stadium, Dhaka
Attendance: 450
Referee: Mizanur Rahman (Bangladesh)

15 September 2019
16:00 BST

NoFeL Sporting Club U-18	2–0	Sheikh Russel KC U-18
Piash 23'; Abir 81'	Report

Bangabandhu National Stadium, Dhaka
Attendance: 300
Referee: Shafiqul Islam Imon (Bangladesh)

17 September 2019
18:30 BST

Sheikh Russel KC U-18	0–3	Saif Sporting Club U-18
	Report	Sujon Mahat 49'; Emon Molla 49' (pen.); Emon Miah 90'

Bangabandhu National Stadium, Dhaka
Attendance: 460
Referee: Ahmed Gordow (Bangladesh)

== Knockout stage ==
- All matches are held at Dhaka
- Time listed UTC+6:00
- In the knockout stage, extra time and penalty shoot-out are used to decide the winner if necessary.

== Bracket ==
Quarter-finals
A1	Brothers Union U-18	2
C2	Bashundhara Kings U-18	3
B1	Arambagh KS U-18	0 (2)
D2	NoFeL Sporting Club U-18	0 (5)
C1	Dhaka Abahani U-18	1 (4)
A2	Chittagong Abahani U-18	1 (5)
D1	Saif Sporting Club U-18	2
B2	Sheikh Jamal Dhanmondi Club U-18	1

Semi-finals
C2	Bashundhara Kings U-18	1 (3)
D2	NoFeL Sporting Club U-18	1 (4)
C2	Dhaka Abahani U-18	0
D1	Saif Sporting Club U-18	5

Final
D2	NoFeL Sporting Club U-18	1
D1	Saif Sporting Club U-18	0

- As Saidu Alias Ramiz of Chittagong Abahani U-18 was found guilty of providing a false identity and conceal his true age according to the article 21.2 and 38.6 of the Walton U-18 football tournament's bylaws, Dhaka Abahani U-18 were declared winner by 3–0.

=== Quarter-finals ===
20 September 2019
17:00 UTC+6:00

Brothers Union U-18	2–3	Bashundhara Kings U-18
Habibur Rahman 11'; Rasel 21'	Report	Rahan Bepari 33'; Sabbir Hossain 45+1', 75'

Bangabandhu National Stadium, Dhaka
Attendance: 670
Referee: Shafiqul Islam Imon (Bangladesh)

21 September 2019
17:00 UTC+6:00

Arambagh KS U-18	0–0	NoFeL Sporting Club U-18
	Report
Penalties
	3–5

Bangabandhu National Stadium, Dhaka
Attendance: 350
Referee: Iqbal Alam (Bangladesh)

22 September 2019
17:00 UTC+6:00

Dhaka Abahani U-18	1–1	Chittagong Abahani U-18
Naymur Rahman Emon 67' (pen.)	Report	Rasel Uddin 86'
Penalties
	4–5 *As Saidu Alias Ramiz of Chittagong Abahani U-18 was found guilty of providing a false identity and conceal his true age according to the article 21.2 and 38.6 of the Walton U-18 football tournament's bylaws, Dhaka Abahani U-18 were declared winner by 3-0.

Bangabandhu National Stadium, Dhaka
Attendance: 425
Referee: Osman Gani (Bangladesh)

23 September 2019
17:00 UTC+6:00

Saif Sporting Club U-18	2–1	Sheikh Jamal Dhanmondi U-18
Sujon Mahat 29'; Emon Molla 89'	Report	Md Jibon 80'

Bangabandhu National Stadium, Dhaka
Attendance: 440
Referee: Jalaluddin (Bangladesh)

=== Semi-finals ===
26 September 2019
17:00 UTC+6:00

Bashundhara Kings U-18	1–1	NoFeL Sporting Club U-18
Shahin 20'	Report	Abir 28'
Penalties
	3–4

Bangabandhu National Stadium, Dhaka
Attendance: 400
Referee: G. Chawdhaury Nayon (Bangladesh)

27 September 2019
17:00 UTC+6:00

Dhaka Abahani U-18	0–5	Saif Sporting Club U-18
	Report	Sakib Bepari 38', 67', 85'; Sujon Mahat 41'; Taj Uddin 62'

Bangabandhu National Stadium, Dhaka
Attendance: 200
Referee: Fareed Ahmed (Bangladesh)

=== Final ===
2 October 2019
14:00 UTC+6:00

NoFeL Sporting Club U-18	1–0	Saif Sporting Club U-18
Arman Hossain Abir 81'	Report

BSSSM Kamal Stadium, Dhaka
Attendance: 700
Referee: Md Jalaluddin (Bangladesh)

== Goalscorers ==
There have been 55 goals scored in 19 matches, for an average of 2.89 goals per match.

3 goals

- (Bangladesh) Iqbal (Dhaka Abahani U-18)
- (Bangladesh) Jamal (Chittagong Abahani U-18)
- (Bangladesh) Sabbir Hossain (Bashundhara Kings U-18)
- (Bangladesh) Sakib Bepari (Saif Sporting Club U-18)
- (Bangladesh) Sujon Mahat (Saif Sporting Club U-18)
- (Bangladesh) Rahul Talukdar (Arambagh KS U-18)
- (Bangladesh) Arman Hossain Abir (NoFeL Sporting Club U-18)

2 goals

- (Bangladesh) Rahan Bepari (Bashundhara Kings U-18)
- (Bangladesh) Badhon (Sheikh Jamal Dhanmondi Club U-18)
- (Bangladesh) Habibur Rahman (Brothers Union U-18)
- (Bangladesh) Rasel Uddin (Chittagong Abahani U-18)
- (Bangladesh) Emon Molla (Saif Sporting Club U-18)

1 goal

- (Bangladesh) Shahin (Bashundhara Kingss U-18)
- (Bangladesh) Piash (NoFeL Sporting Club U-18)
- (Bangladesh) Jihan (Sheikh Jamal Dhanmondi Club U-18)
- (Bangladesh) Rabbi (Sheikh Jamal Dhanmondi Club U-18)
- (Bangladesh) Milon (Sheikh Jamal Dhanmondi Club U-18)
- (Bangladesh) Ibrahim (Chittagong Abahani U-18)
- (Bangladesh) Emon Miah (Saif Sporting Club U-18)
- (Bangladesh) Saniyat Hasan Sahad (Saif Sporting Club U-18)
- (Bangladesh) Md Taj Uddin (Saif Sporting Club U-18)
- (Bangladesh) Mezbah (NoFeL Sporting Club U-18)
- (Bangladesh) Touhid (Muktijoddha Sangsad KC U-18)
- (Bangladesh) Jalal (Brothers Union U-18)
- (Bangladesh) Rashed (Brothers Union U-18)
- (Bangladesh) Minhajul (Brothers Union U-18)
- (Bangladesh) Akash (Arambagh KS U-18)
- (Bangladesh) Shuvo Rajbongshi (Bashundhara Kings U-18)
- (Bangladesh) Ashiqul (Brothers Union U-18)
- (Bangladesh) Fahim (Chittagong Abahani U-18)
- (Bangladesh) Sakir (Dhaka Abahani U-18)
- (Bangladesh) Rakib (Dhaka Abahani U-18)
- (Bangladesh) Imran (Dhaka Mohammedan U-18)
- (Bangladesh) Rasel (Brothers Union U-18)
- (Bangladesh) Naymur Rahman Emon (Dhaka Abahani U-18)
- (Bangladesh) Md Jibon (Sheikh Jamal Dhanmondi Club U-18)
