= 2022–23 Bangladesh Championship League =

11th Professional season of Bangladesh Championship League

Bangladesh Championship League
- Season: 2022–23
- Dates: 21 December 2022–19 April 2023
- Champions: Brothers Union (1st titles)
- Promoted: Brothers Union; Gopalganj Sporting Club
- Relegated: Little Friends Club; Swadhinata KS
- Matches: 110
- Goals: 270 (2.45 per match)
- Top goalscorer: 19 goals (Bangladesh) Mirajul Islam (BFF Elite Academy)
- Biggest home win: Dhaka WC 4–0 Gopalganj Sporting Club (24 January 2023) BFF Elite Academy 4–0 Dhaka WC (16 February 2023)
- Biggest away win: Little Friends Club 0–5 Gopalganj Sporting Club (12 January 2023) Wari Club 0–5 BFF Elite Academy (16 January 2023)
- Highest scoring: Swadhinata KS 3–4 Gopalganj Sporting Club (7 April 2023)
- Longest winning run: 8 matches Brothers Union
- Longest unbeaten run: 9 matches Brothers Union
- Longest winless run: 5 matches Swadhinata KS
- Longest losing run: 5 matches Swadhinata KS

The 2022–23 Bangladesh Championship League was the 11th season of the Bangladesh Championship League, Bangladesh's second-tier professional football league. The season started on 21 December 2022 and ended on 19 April 2023.

Brothers Union were crowned champions of the 2022–23 season.

== Team changes ==
The following teams have changed divisions since the previous season:

=== To BCL ===
Directly promoted

- Fortis FC Academy
- Little Friends Club

Relegated from the BPL

- ~~Uttar Baridhara SC~~
- Swadhinata KS

Re-entry

- Brothers Union who were relegated after the 2021–22 Bangladesh Premier League, decided participate in the BCL this season after withdrawing from the previous edition.

=== From BCL ===
Promoted to the BPL

- AFC Uttara
- Fortis FC

Relegated to Dhaka Senior Division Football League

- Farashganj SC
- ~~Kawran Bazar PS~~

Retractation

- Agrani Bank Ltd. SC decided to quit from all kinds of football activities from the 2022–23 season.

== Venue ==
All matches are playing at the BSSS Mostafa Kamal Stadium in Dhaka, Bangladesh

Dhaka	Dhaka is located in Bangladesh
BSSS Mostafa Kamal Stadium	Dhaka is located in Bangladesh
Capacity: 25,000	Dhaka is located in Bangladesh

== Team locations ==
Team	Location
Brothers Union	(Gopibagh), Dhaka
BFF Elite Academy	(Motijheel), Dhaka
Fortis FC Academy	(Badda), Dhaka
Gopalganj Sporting Club	Gopalganj
Dhaka WC	(Motijheel), Dhaka
Fakirerpool YMC	(Motijheel), Dhaka
Little Friends Club	(Gopibagh), Dhaka
NoFeL Sporting Club	Noakhali
Swadhinata KS	Dhaka
Uttara FC	(Uttara), Dhaka
Wari Club	(Motijheel), Dhaka

== League table ==
Pos	Team	Pld	W	D	L	GF	GA	GD	Pts	BPL
1	Brothers Union (C, P)	20	16	3	1	30	7	+23	51	Qualification to 2023–24 Bangladesh Premier League
2	BFF Elite Academy (Note: BFF Elite Academy is not eligible for promotion or relegation from the Bangladesh Championship League.)	20	15	1	4	47	17	+30	46	
3	Gopalganj Sporting Club (P)	20	11	1	8	33	27	+6	34	Qualification to 2023–24 Bangladesh Premier League
4	Fakirerpool YMC	20	8	5	7	22	24	−2	29	
5	NoFeL Sporting Club	20	6	7	7	26	25	+1	25	
6	Wari Club	20	6	7	7	23	24	−1	25	
7	Dhaka Wanderers	20	6	6	8	26	27	−1	24	
8	Fortis FC Academy	20	5	7	8	16	22	−6	22	
9	Uttara FC	20	5	5	10	16	23	−7	20	
10	Swadhinata KS (R)	20	5	4	11	20	34	−14	19	Relegation to Senior Division League
11	Little Friends Club (R)	20	3	2	15	11	40	−29	11	Relegation to Senior Division League

Source: Global Sports Archive
Rules for classification: 1) Points; 2) Goal difference; 3) Goals scored;
(C) Champions; (P) Promoted; (R) Relegated

== Results ==
=== Result table ===
Home \ Away	BU	BEA	DWC	FFC	FYMC	GSC	LFC	NSC	SKS	UFC	WC
Brothers Union	—	0–1	0–0	1–0	2–0	1–0	2–1	3–0	2–1	2–0	2–1
BFF Football Academy	1–2	—	4–0	3–1	0–1	1–2	3–0	2–1	2–0	3–1	2–1
Dhaka Wanderers	1–0	2–3	—	3–2	0–1	4–0	3–1	0–0	1–1	1–0	1–1
Fortis FC Academy	0–1	0–0	0–1	—	1–1	3–2	2–1	0–3	0–0	0–0	1–1
Fakirerpool YMC	0–3	3–0	1–3	0–1	—	3–2	2–0	1–1	3–1	2–1	0–0
Gopalganj Sporting Club	0–3	2–4	1–0	1–0	2–0	—	0–1	1–0	2–0	2–1	2–0
Little Friends Club	0–1	1–0	1–4	0–0	1–3	0–5	—	0–3	1–2	0–3	0–3
NoFeL Sporting Club	1–1	4–2	1–0	1–1	1–2	2–1	1–3	—	3–1	1–1	0–0
Swadhinata KS	0–0	0–3	3–2	3–2	0–0	3–4	2–0	1–3	—	1–0	1–2
Uttara FC	0–1	1–3	1–1	0–1	2–1	0–0	1–0	2–1	1–0	—	1–1
Wari Club	1–2	0–5	1–4	0–1	1–0	1–4	0–0	1–1	3–0	2–0	—

Source: SofaScore
Legend: Blue = home team win; Yellow = draw; Red = away team win.

=== Positions by round ===
The following table lists the positions of teams after each week of matches. In order to preserve the chronological evolution, any postponed matches are not included to the round at which they were originally scheduled but added to the full round they were played immediately afterward.

Team ╲ Round	1	2	3	4	5	6	7	8	9	10	11	12	13	14	15	16	17	18	19	20	21	22
Brothers Union	2	1	2	1	1	1	1	1	1	1	1	1	2	2	2	2	2	1	1	1	1	1
BFF Elite Academy	9	5	3	3	3	2	2	2	2	2	2	2	1	1	1	1	1	2	2	2	2	2
Dhaka WC	10	11	11	10	8	5	7	7	7	7	8	7	7	6	8	7	7	7	7	7	7	7
Fortis FC Academy	4	6	7	7	10	10	10	8	8	8	9	10	10	10	9	10	10	10	10	10	8	8
Fakirerpool YMC	6	8	8	6	4	4	6	4	4	4	5	5	5	5	5	5	5	4	4	4	4	4
Gopalganj SC	3	2	1	2	2	3	5	3	3	3	3	4	3	3	3	3	3	3	3	3	3	3
Little Friends Club	11	10	9	11	11	11	11	11	11	11	11	11	11	11	11	11	11	11	11	11	11	11
NoFeL SC	5	7	5	5	6	7	4	6	6	5	4	3	4	4	4	4	4	5	5	6	5	5
Swadhinata KS	1	3	4	4	5	8	8	9	10	10	10	9	8	8	6	8	8	8	9	9	10	10
Uttara FC	8	4	6	8	9	6	3	5	5	6	7	8	9	9	10	9	9	9	8	8	9	9
Wari Club	7	9	10	9	7	9	9	10	9	9	6	6	6	7	7	6	6	6	6	5	6	6

Leader
Runners-up
Relegation to Senior Division League

Source: SofaScore

=== Results by games ===
Team ╲ Round	1	2	3	4	5	6	7	8	9	10	11	12	13	14	15	16	17	18	19	20	21	22
Brothers Union	W	W	D	W	W	-	D	W	W	W	W	L	D	W	W	W	-	W	W	W	W	W
BFF Elite Academy	L	W	W	W	L	W	-	W	W	W	D	W	W	W	W	W	L	-	W	W	L	W
Dhaka WC	L	L	L	D	W	W	D	-	D	D	L	W	L	D	L	W	W	L	-	L	W	D
Fortis FC Academy	D	D	D	-	L	L	D	W	D	L	D	L	L	W	-	L	L	W	D	W	W	L
Fakirerpool YMC	D	L	-	W	W	D	D	W	D	L	W	L	W	-	L	L	W	W	W	L	L	D
Gopalganj SC	W	W	W	L	-	L	L	W	W	W	L	L	W	D	W	-	W	W	W	L	L	L
Little Friends Club	L	-	D	L	L	D	L	L	L	L	L	L	-	L	L	L	L	L	L	W	W	L
NoFeL SC	D	L	W	D	D	D	W	L	-	W	W	W	D	D	D	L	L	L	L	-	W	W
Swadhinata KS	W	D	D	D	L	L	D	L	L	L	-	W	W	L	W	L	W	L	L	L	L	-
Uttara FC	-	W	L	L	D	W	W	L	L	D	L	-	L	D	L	W	L	W	D	L	L	D
Wari Club	D	L	L	D	W	D	D	L	D	-	W	W	L	L	D	W	W	L	L	W	-	D

Source: SofaScore
W = Win; D = Draw; L = Lose

== Season statistics ==
=== Goalscorers ===
There have been 270 goals scored in 110 matches, for an average of 2.45 goals per match.

19 goals

- (Bangladesh) Mirajul Islam (BFF Elite Academy)

13 goals

- (Bangladesh) Asadul Molla (BFF Elite Academy)

12 goals

- (Bangladesh) Rahmat Jisan Ullah (Fortis FC Academy)

10 goals

- (Bangladesh) Sourov Dewan (Dhaka Wanderers Club)

8 goals

- (Bangladesh) Safin Ahmed (Gopalganj Sporting Club)
- (Bangladesh) Iftsham Rahman Zidan (Gopalganj Sporting Club)

7 goals

- (Bangladesh) Md Mishu Mia (Uttara FC)
- (Bangladesh) Abid Hasan Abir (NoFeL Sporting Club)
- (Bangladesh) Hafizur Rahman (Wari Club)
- (Bangladesh) Md Sohag Mia (Dhaka Wanderers Club)

6 goals

- (Bangladesh) Md Sohag Hossain (Brothers Union)

5 goals

- (Bangladesh) Asikur Rahman Asik (Swadhinata KS)
- (Bangladesh) Md Jakir Hossain Ziku (Brothers Union)
- (Bangladesh) Mohsin Ahmed (Gopalganj Sporting Club)
- (Bangladesh) Md Musa (Fakirerpool YMC)
- (Bangladesh) Imran Hossain (Brothers Union)
- (Bangladesh) Md Rasedol (Swadhinata KS)

4 goals

- (Bangladesh) Md Rabby Hossen Rahul (Wari Club)
- (Bangladesh) Tarikul Islam (Fakirerpool YMC)
- (Bangladesh) Md Elias (NoFeL Sporting Club)
- (Bangladesh) Dalim Barman (Fakirerpool YMC)
- (Bangladesh) Sagor Miah Shawon (Swadhinata KS)

3 goals

- (Bangladesh) Kankar Biswas (NoFeL Sporting Club)
- (Bangladesh) Raju Ahmed Zisan (Gopalganj Sporting Club)
- (Bangladesh) Mohammad Jewel Mollik (Brothers Union)
- (Bangladesh) Sajed Hasan Jummon Nijum (BFF Elite Academy)
- (Bangladesh) Munna Biswas (NoFeL Sporting Club)
- (Bangladesh) Md Imran Khan (BFF Elite Academy)
- (Bangladesh) Mohammad Tara (Brothers Union)
- (Bangladesh) Md Arafat Mia (NoFeL Sporting Club)
- (Bangladesh) Md Murshed Ali (BFF Elite Academy)

2 goals

- (Bangladesh) Md Jibon Mia (Wari Club)
- (Bangladesh) Md Ali Akbar (Wari Club)
- (Bangladesh) Zahidul Hassan (Little Friends Club)
- (Bangladesh) Md Zakirul Islam (Uttara FC)
- (Bangladesh) Shanto Tudo (Fakirerpool YMC)
- (Bangladesh) Jobaed Hasen Jikon (Brothers Union)
- (Bangladesh) Khairul Islam Nirob (Uttara FC)
- (Bangladesh) Samuel Raksam (BFF Elite Academy)
- (Bangladesh) Md Shakil Ali (Gopalganj Sporting Club)
- (Bangladesh) Md Sumon Islam (Fakirerpool YMC)
- (Bangladesh) Afroz Ali (Brothers Union)
- (Bangladesh) Md Shihab Miah (Dhaka Wanderers Club)
- (Bangladesh) Md Noyon Mia (Swadhinata KS)
- (Bangladesh) Md Emon Ali (NoFeL Sporting Club)
- (Bangladesh) Fahim Uddin (Gopalganj Sporting Club)
- (Bangladesh) Julkar Nain Sardar Rafi (Little Friends Club)
- (Bangladesh) Hira Gosh (Little Friends Club)
- (Bangladesh) Md Rubel Shaikh (BFF Elite Academy)
- (Bangladesh) Md Rayhan (Dhaka Wanderers Club)
- (Bangladesh) Asadul Islam Sakib (Uttara FC)
- (Bangladesh) Md Naimul Ahmed Shakil (Wari Club)

1 goal

- (Bangladesh) Shariar Hossain Rimon (Dhaka Wanderers Club)
- (Bangladesh) Ashikur Rahman Bhuiyan (Wari Club)
- (Bangladesh) Md Siful Islam (Gopalganj Sporting Club)
- (Bangladesh) Anik Deb Barma (Gopalganj Sporting Club)
- (Bangladesh) Md Shakil Ahad Topu (Uttara FC)
- (Bangladesh) Iqbal Hossain (Swadhinata KS)
- (Bangladesh) Md Roman (NoFeL Sporting Club)
- (Bangladesh) Md Munno Mia (Brothers Union)
- (Bangladesh) Hefaz Uddin (Dhaka Wanderers Club)
- (Bangladesh) Mohammed Tanin Sarker (Gopalganj Sporting Club)
- (Bangladesh) Raihan Mollah (Little Friends Club)
- (Bangladesh) Md Samimul Haque (Swadhinata KS)
- (Bangladesh) Md Golam Sarwar (Dhaka Wanderers Club)
- (Bangladesh) Md Al Mirad (Uttara FC)
- (Bangladesh) Md Sujon (Dhaka Wanderers Club)
- (Bangladesh) Md Sabbir Hossain Mollah (Fortis FC Academy)
- (Bangladesh) Riaz Choiyal (Wari Club)
- (Bangladesh) Md Ripon Mollah (Fakirerpool YMC)
- (Bangladesh) Md Arif Hossain Masud (Fortis FC Academy)
- (Bangladesh) Md Jakir Hossain Ziku (Brothers Union)
- (Bangladesh) Md Saiful Islam (Brothers Union)
- (Bangladesh) Akash Ali (Dhaka Wanderers Club)
- (Bangladesh) Emon Barua (Wari Club)
- (Bangladesh) Md Sagor Hossain Mondul (Fakirerpool YMC)
- (Bangladesh) Md Munna (Swadhinata KS)
- (Bangladesh) Mehedi Hasan (Little Friends Club)
- (Bangladesh) Nazmul Huda Faysal (BFF Elite Academy)
- (Bangladesh) Rakib Hossen (BFF Elite Academy)
- (Bangladesh) Tanjil Hossain Shuvo (Uttara FC)
- (Bangladesh) Elias Hasdak (NoFeL Sporting Club)
- (Bangladesh) Md Ifran Hossain (Fakirerpool YMC)
- (Bangladesh) Md Al-Amin (Wari Club)
- (Bangladesh) Md Saiful Islam Sayeed (Little Friends Club)
- (Bangladesh) Sojol Ahmed (Wari Club)
- (Bangladesh) Porimol Baidya (Wari Club)
- (Bangladesh) Md Al-Amin Rahman (Little Friends Club)
- (Bangladesh) Md Hafizur Rahman (Fortis FC Academy)
- (Bangladesh) Md Parvej Mia (Fortis FC Academy)
- (Bangladesh) Jubayer Ahmed (Gopalganj Sporting Club)
- (Bangladesh) Md Rakib (NoFeL Sporting Club)
- (Bangladesh) Sarikul Islam Zahid (Little Friends Club)
- (Bangladesh) Samor Joy Tanchangya (Fakirerpool YMC)

Source: BFF

=== Own goals ===
† Bold Club indicates winner of the match

Player	Club	Opponent	Result	Date
(Bangladesh) Topu Tarafdar	NoFeL Sporting Club	Brothers Union	0–3	27 December 2022
(Bangladesh) Jubayer Ahmed	Swadhinata KS	Gopalganj SC	0–2	20 January 2023
(Bangladesh) Kamacai Marma	Fortis FC Academy	Swadhinata KS	2–3	15 February 2023
(Bangladesh) Shamim Amzad	Uttara FC	NoFeL Sporting Club	2–1	29 March 2023
(Bangladesh) Md Rakib	NoFeL Sporting Club	Fakirerpool YMC	0–2	1 April 2023

=== Hat-tricks ===
Player	For	Against	Result	Date	Ref
(Bangladesh) Mirajul Islam	BFF Elite Academy	Uttara FC	3–1	6 January 2023	
(Bangladesh) Safin Ahmed	Gopalganj Sporting Club	Little Friends Club	5–0	24 January 2023	
(Bangladesh) Mirajul Islam	BFF Elite Academy	Little Friends Club	3–0	28 January 2023	
(Bangladesh) Sourov Dewan	Dhaka Wanderers Club	Gopalganj Sporting Club	4–0	12 February 2023	
(Bangladesh) Asadul Molla	BFF Elite Academy	Fakirerpool YMC	3–0	29 March 2023	
(Bangladesh) Hafizur Rahman	Wair Club	Swadhinata KS	3–0	29 March 2023	

== See also ==
- 2022–23 Bangladesh Premier League
- 2022–23 Federation Cup (Bangladesh)
- 2022–23 Independence Cup (Bangladesh)
