= Gopalganj Sporting Club =

Gopalganj SC গোপালগঞ্জ স্পোর্টিং ক্লাব
- Full name: Gopalganj Sporting Club
- Short name: GSC
- Founded: 2021; 5 years ago
- Ground: Sheikh Fazlul Haque Mani Stadium
- Capacity: 5,000
- President: Gazi Hafizur Rahman Liku
- Head Coach: Vacant
- League: Bangladesh Premier League
- 2022–23: Championship League, 3rd of 11 (Promoted)
- Website: gsclubbd.com
Home colours	Away colours

Gopalganj Sporting Club (Bengali: গোপালগঞ্জ স্পোর্টিং ক্লাব, Bengali pronunciation: [ɡopalgɔndʒ spoɾʈiŋ klab]) is a Bangladeshi professional football club based in Gopalganj. The club was set to compete in the Bangladesh Premier League, the top tier of Bangladeshi football league system, after being promoted from the Bangladesh Championship League in the 2022–23 season. However, on 18 October 2023, the club announced its withdrawal from the league due to financial shortages.

== History ==
Gopalganj Sporting Club was established in 2021, and the club's first president, Gazi Hafizur Rahman Liku is also the assistant private secretary of Prime Minister Sheikh Hasina, and both of their families reside from Gopalganj District. Former Bangladesh national team captain Elias Hossain, who is the first and only international player originating from the district, also played an integral part in the club's formation.

In 2021, the Bangladesh Football Federation gave the club permission to play in the professional second-tier league, the Bangladesh Championship League from the 2021–22 season, without having to play in the semi-professional lower divisions, despite reports of the club not having the proper accommodation required to play in country's the professional league. On 20 February 2022, the club played its first league game, which ended in a goalless draw with Fortis FC. On 11 March 2022, Mohammed Nahian scored the clubs first goal, coming in a 1–1 draw with Wari Club. On 18 March 2022, the club registered its first victory by defeating Farashganj SC, 2–1. Eventually, their first domestic league season ended with a 5th-place finish.

The club began the 2022–23 season with three straight victories. On 11 April 2023, the club guaranteed a minimum 3rd-place finish in the league table and due to second place BFF Elite Academy being non eligible for either promotion or relegation, Gopalganj were promoted to the Bangladesh Premier League for the first time in history from 2023 to 2024 season.

== Home venue ==
While playing in the Bangladesh Championship League from 2022 till 2023 they used the 25,000 capacity BSSS Mostafa Kamal Stadium in Kamalapur, Dhaka, which was the central venue used by all second-tier clubs. Following, promotion to Bangladesh Premier League, the team manager, SM Mamunur Rashid, confirmed that they would be using the 5,000 capacity Sheikh Fazlul Haque Mani Stadium in Gopalganj as their home venue.

== Players ==
Gopalganj Sporting Club squad for 2022–23 season.

As of 16 January 2023

Note: Flags indicate national team as defined under FIFA eligibility rules; some limited exceptions apply. Players may hold more than one non-FIFA nationality.

No.	Pos.	Nation	Player
1	GK	BAN	Mohammed Salim
2	DF	BAN	Mohammed Muntasir Rahman
3	DF	BAN	Mohammed Shaharul Islam
4	DF	BAN	Manik Molla
5	DF	BAN	Mohammed Golam Rabbani
6	DF	BAN	Mohammed Zahid Hossen
7	MF	BAN	Mohammed Faizullah
8	MF	BAN	Farhad Mia
9	FW	BAN	Md Noor Alam Siddik
10	MF	BAN	Safin Ahmed
11	MF	BAN	Md Shakil Ali
12	DF	BAN	Md Hasibul Hasan Shanto
13	DF	BAN	Apurbo Mali
14	DF	BAN	Mohammed Rasel Munshi
15	DF	BAN	Mohammed Saimon
16	MF	BAN	Mohammed Tanin Sarker
17	FW	BAN	Fahim Uddin
18	FW	BAN	Iftsham Rahman Zidan

No.	Pos.	Nation	Player
19	MF	BAN	Mohammed Mahmudul Hasan
20	MF	BAN	Mohsin Ahmed
21	MF	BAN	Mohammed Shawon
22	DF	BAN	Mohammed Riaz
23	DF	BAN	Md Rakibul Islam
24	DF	BAN	Gausul Akbar Sabin
25	DF	BAN	Md Yusuf Ali
26	MF	BAN	Md Emon Islam Babu
27	MF	BAN	Shaporan Pranto
28	FW	BAN	Mohammed Abdul Halim
29	MF	BAN	Md Salman Khan
30	MF	BAN	Raju Ahmed Zisan
31	MF	BAN	Md Siful Islam
32	FW	BAN	Aswad Bin Walid Khan
33	GK	BAN	Md Sabbir Gazi
34	GK	BAN	Md Anik Ahmed
35	GK	BAN	Md Shohug Hossain

== Coaching staff ==
=== Coaches ===
- (Bangladesh) Abdur Razzaque (January 2022 – June 2022)
- (Bangladesh) Saifur Rahman Moni (December 2022 – October 2023)

=== Managerial statistics ===
As of 19 April 2023

Head Coach	From	To	P	W	D	L	GF	GA	%W
(Bangladesh) Abdur Razzaque	20 January 2022	13 June 2022	22	8	7	7	20	20	36.36
(Bangladesh) Saifur Rahman Moni	21 December 2022	18 October 2023	20	11	1	8	33	27	55.00

== Personnel ==
=== Current technical staff ===
As of 8 February 2024

Position	Name
Head coach	Vacant
Team leader	(Bangladesh) Md Mashinur Rahman Khan
Team manager	(Bangladesh) SM Mamun Or Rashid
Assistant manager	(Bangladesh) Abul Hossain Pappu
Assistant coach	(Bangladesh) A.B.M. Meheid Habib
Goalkeeping coach	(Bangladesh) Shamsuzzaman Yusuf
Fitness trainer	(Bangladesh) Jewel Mahmud
Masseur	(Bangladesh) Sohel (Bangladesh) Sumon

=== Club officials ===
As of 6 June 2023

Position	Name
President	(Bangladesh) Gazi Hafizur Rahman Liku
General Secretary	(Bangladesh) Mohammed Hira

== Competitive record ==
Record as Professional Football League member
Season	Division	League								Federation Cup	Independence Cup	Top league scorer(s)	
Season	Division	P	W	D	L	GF	GA	Pts	Position	Federation Cup	Independence Cup	Player	Goals
2021–22	BCL	22	8	7	7	20	20	31	5th	—			
2022–23	BCL	20	11	1	8	33	27	34	3rd	—		(Bangladesh) Safin Ahmed (Bangladesh) Iftsham Rahman Zidan	8
2023–24	BPL												

Champions	Runners-up	Third place	Promoted	Relegated
