= Hamidur Rahman Remon =

Bangladeshi footballer

Personal information
- Full name: Md Hamidur Rahman Remon
- Date of birth: 20 October 1990 (age 36)
- Place of birth: Sylhet, Bangladesh
- Height: 1.78 m (5 ft 10 in)
- Position: Goalkeeper

Youth career
- 2012–2014: Jalalabad Club

Senior career*
Years	Team	Apps	(Gls)
2015–2017	Victoria SC		
2018–2019	Rahmatganj MFS	7	(0)
2019–2023	Bashundhara Kings	4	(0)
2023–2024	Sheikh Jamal DC	2	(0)
2024–2025	Dhaka Wanderers	0	(0)
- * Club domestic league appearances and goals as of 3 May 2024

Hamidur Rahman Remon (Bengali: হামিদুর রহমান রিমন, born 20 October 1990) is a Bangladeshi professional footballer who plays as a goalkeeper. He most recently played for Bangladesh Premier League club Dhaka Wanderers.

== Early life ==
Remon was born on 20 October 1990 in Sylhet. He began his career as a goalkeeper by playing for Jalalabad Club in the Sylhet First Division Football League. Eventually, in 2013, he was called up to the preliminary squad of the Bangladesh U20 team, however, failed to make the final squad.

== Club career ==
=== Victoria SC ===
In 2015, Remon joined Bangladesh Championship League club Victoria SC, and was soon made club captain.

=== Rahmatganj MFS ===
Remon made his Bangladesh Premier League debut with Rahmatganj MFS in the 2018–19 season. He made a total of 7 appearances for the club.

=== Bashundhara Kings ===
In 2019, Remon joined Bashundhara Kings, where he spent majority of his tenure as a second choice goalkeeper to Anisur Rahman Zico. On 11 March 2022, Remon who came on as a substitute against Chittagong Abahani during a league fixture, collided with opposition forward Peter Ebimobowei. The collision resulted in Remon requiring 17 stitches on his head.

== Honours ==
Bashundhara Kings

- Bangladesh Premier League: 2020–21, 2021–22, 2022–23
- Federation Cup: 2020–21
- Independence Cup: 2022–23
