= 2013 Federation Cup (Bangladesh) =

2013 Walton Federation Cup
Tournament details
- Country: Bangladesh
- Dates: 21 November – 9 December 2013
- Teams: 12

Final positions
- Champions: Sheikh Jamal Dhanmondi Club (2nd title)
- Runners-up: Muktijoddha Sangsad KC

Tournament statistics
- Matches played: 19
- Goals scored: 50 (2.63 per match)

The 2013 Bangladesh Federation Cup was the 26th edition to be played and was known as the Walton Federation Cup due to sponsorship reasons.

The competition started on 21 November and finished with the final at the Bangabandhu National Stadium on 9 December.

Twelve teams took part with the first round being played as a group stage; all groups contained three teams. The top two sides from each group qualified for the knock-out stages.

== Group stage ==
=== Group A ===
Team	Pld	W	D	L	GF	GA	GD	Pts
Sheikh Jamal Dhanmondi Club	2	2	0	0	3	0	+3	6
Feni Soccer Club	2	1	0	1	3	3	0	3
Uttar Baridhara SC	2	0	0	2	2	5	−3	0

2013-11-21
Sheikh Jamal Dhanmondi Club	2–0	Uttar Baridhara SC
2013-11-23
Uttar Baridhara SC	2–3	Feni Soccer Club
2013-11-25
Feni Soccer Club	0–1	Sheikh Jamal Dhanmondi Club

=== Group B ===
Team	Pld	W	D	L	GF	GA	GD	Pts
Muktijoddha Sangsad KS	2	2	0	0	4	2	+2	6
Sheikh Russel KC	2	1	0	1	1	1	0	3
Abahani Limited Chittagong	2	0	0	2	2	4	−2	0

2013-11-22
Sheikh Russel KC	1–0	Abahani Limited Chittagong
2013-11-24
Abahani Limited Chittagong	2–3	Muktijoddha Sangsad KS
2013-11-26
Muktijoddha Sangsad KS	1–0	Sheikh Russel KC

=== Group C ===
Team	Pld	W	D	L	GF	GA	GD	Pts
Team BJMC	2	1	1	0	4	3	+1	4
Brothers Union	2	1	0	1	3	3	0	3
BD Police	2	0	1	1	3	4	−1	1

2013-11-22
Team BJMC	2–2	BD Police
2013-11-24
BD Police	1–2	Brothers Union
2013-11-26
Brothers Union	1–2	Team BJMC

=== Group D ===
Team	Pld	W	D	L	GF	GA	GD	Pts
Abahani Limited Dhaka	2	2	0	0	5	0	+5	6
Mohammedan	2	1	0	1	5	4	+1	3
Rahmatganj MFS	2	0	0	2	2	8	−6	0

2013-11-21
Abahani Limited Dhaka	3–0	Rahmatganj MFS
2013-11-23
Rahmatganj MFS	2–5	Mohammedan
2013-11-25
Mohammedan	0–2	Abahani Limited Dhaka

== Quarter finals ==
29 November 2013

Sheikh Jamal Dhanmondi Club	3 – 1	Mohammedan

Bangabandhu National Stadium
30 November 2013

Feni Soccer Club	0 – 2	Abahani Limited Dhaka

Bangabandhu National Stadium
1 December 2013

Muktijoddha Sangsad KS	2 – 0	Brothers Union

Bangabandhu National Stadium
2 December 2013

Sheikh Russel KC	2 – 2 (a.e.t.)	Team BJMC
Penalties
	4 – 5

Bangabandhu National Stadium

== Semi finals ==
6 December 2013

Sheikh Jamal Dhanmondi Club	3 – 0	Abahani Limited Dhaka
Wedson Anselme 5 Sony Norde 21 Sony Norde 38

Bangabandhu National Stadium
7 December 2013

Muktijoddha Sangsad KS	1 – 1 (a.e.t.)	Team BJMC
Eleta Kingsley 76		Ismaël Bangoura 86 (p)
Penalties
	5 – 3

Bangabandhu National Stadium

== Final ==
13 December 2013

Sheikh Jamal Dhanmondi Club	1 – 0	Muktijoddha Sangsad KS

Bangabandhu National Stadium
