= BFF U-18 Football Tournament =

- Founded: 2014
- Abolished: 2019
- Teams: 12
- Last champions: NoFeL Sporting Club (1st title)
- Most championships: Dhaka Abahani; Dhaka Mohammedan; NoFeL Sporting Club
- 2019

The BFF U-18 Football Tournament was a youth club football tournament in Bangladesh which was managed, organized and controlled by the Bangladesh Football Federation (BFF).

== History ==
The tournament was established in 2014, in order for Bangladesh Premier League (BPL) clubs to develop young players. With each team playing in the BPL during that specific season fielded their U18 players. The first three editions saw clubs split into a group of four, while the top two out of the three teams in the group advancing to the Quarter-Finals. After the first edition of the league in 2014, the Bangladesh Football Federation (BFF) did not arrange the tournament again until 2018.

== Tournament's summaries ==
| Year | Final |
| Year | Champion | Score | Runner Up |
|---|---|---|---|
| 2014 BFF U-18 Football Tournament | Dhaka Mohammedan | 2–0 | Brothers Union |
| 2018 BFF U-18 Football Tournament | Dhaka Abahani | 1–0 | Farashganj SC |
| 2019 BFF U-18 Football Tournament | NoFeL Sporting Club | 1–0 | Saif Sporting Club |

=== Top goalscorers by edition ===
| Years | Players | Clubs | Goals |
|---|---|---|---|
| 2014 | (Bangladesh) Masud Rana | Sheikh Russel KC U-18 | 3 |
| 2018 | (Bangladesh) Apon Chandra (Bangladesh) Abu Raihan (Bangladesh) Shakil Ahmed | Dhaka Abahani U-18; Brothers Union U-18; Arambagh KS U-18 | 3 |
| 2019 | (Bangladesh) Rahul (Bangladesh) Jamal (Bangladesh) Iqbal (Bangladesh) Mohammed Sabbir (Bangladesh) Arman Hossain Abir | Arambagh KS U-18; Chittagong Abahani U-18; Dhaka Abahani U-18; Bashundhara Kings U-18; NoFeL Sporting Club U-18 | 3 |

== Controversies ==
During the 2019 BFF U-18 Football Tournament, Saidu Alias Ramiz from Chittagong Abahani Limited U-18 team w was found guilty of age fraud, his team was therefore disqualified. Age fraud has been a constant issue during the tenure of the tournament, the federation thus made it mandatory for clubs to provide MRI test results before participating.

== See also ==
- BFF U-18 Football League
