= Muktijoddha Sangsad =

- মুক্তিযোদ্ধা সংসদ
- Logo
- Abbreviation: Jamuka
- Formation: February 13, 1972; 54 years ago
- Type: Non-political welfare organization for the fighters of the Bangladesh Liberation War
- Headquarters: Rupnagar Road
- Official language: Bengali
- Website: muktijoddhasangsad.com

Muktijoddha Sangsad is a non-political welfare association of the combatants during the Bangladesh Liberation War formed on 13 February 1972. The organisation has a football club, Muktijoddha Sangsad KC, named after itself.

== History ==
After the Partition of India, East Bengal (present Bangladesh) became a province of Pakistan, later named East Pakistan. The relation between East and West Pakistan deteriorated after the partition. In 1970 Pakistan general election was won by the East Pakistan-based Awami League which was led by Sheikh Mujibur Rahman. The Pakistan Military government refused to handover power to Sheikh Mujibur Rahman. On 25 March 1971 Pakistan military launched Operation Searchlight in East Pakistan, attacking political opponents in East Pakistan and starting the Bangladesh Liberation war. The Mukti Bahini was formed by Bengali personal of Pakistani security forces and civilians to fight for the Independence of Bangladesh and was commanded by the Mujibnagar government, the Bangladesh government in exile. Bangladesh became an independent country on 16 December 1971 through the signing of Pakistani Instrument of Surrender.

During the 9 months' struggling, Bangladesh became independent on 16 December 1971. About 3 million people had died and about 0.3 million women were raped by Pakistan military and allied paramilitaries. Muktijoddha Sangsad was formed on 13 February 1972, to preserve the memories of the Bangladesh Liberation war and look after the welfare of former Members of the Mukti Bahini. The aim of the organization is to find out living freedom fighters and give them national recognition. It formed the Muktijodda Kalyan Trust was formed to look after the welfare of Mukti Bahini members. It worked to ensure that they were able to access the 30% quota on government jobs and that they had indemnity from criminal cases filed against them before 28 February 1972 during the Bangladesh Liberation war.
