= Francisco Bruto Da Costa =

Indian association football manager

Francisco Bruto da Costa
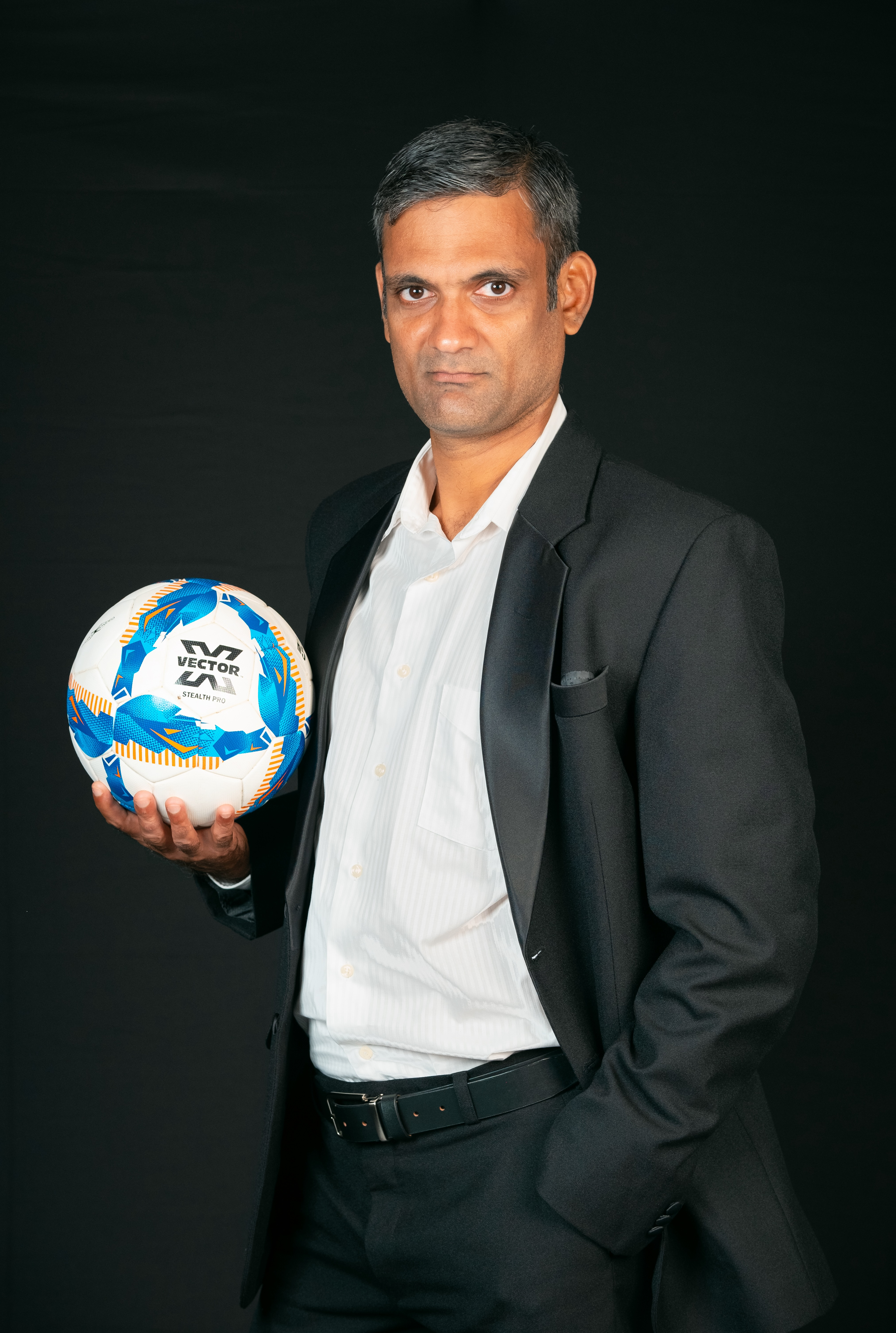
- Francisco Bruto da Costa in 2025

Personal information
- Full name: Francisco Bruto da Costa
- Date of birth: 2 December 1981 (age 44)
- Place of birth: Margao, Goa

Team information
- Current team: Geno Football Club (Head Coach)

Managerial career
- Years: Team
- 2001–2007: Salgaocar U18 (manager)
- 2008–2010: Salgaocar U18 (technical director)
- 2010–2014: India U19 (assistant)
- 2015–2016: India U16 (assistant)
- 2016: India U16
- 2016–2017: NorthEast United FC (assistant)
- 2017: Malaysia (assistant)
- 2018–2019: Sheikh Russel KC (assistant cum fitness coach)
- 2019: Kerala Blasters FC (assistant)
- 2020: East Bengal
- 2020–2021: Sheikh Russel KC (assistant)
- 2021–2022: Egypt (technical assistant)
- 2022–2023: Fortis FC (assistant)
- 2023–2024: Sheikh Jamal Dhanmondi (assistant)
- 2024-2025: The Cong-Viettel FC (fitness coach)
- 2025-: Geno Football Club (Head Coach)

Francisco Bruto da Costa is a Portuguese Professional Football Manager who is the current Head Coach of Geno Football Club in the Goa Professional League.

He was the head coach of SC East Bengal. The contract was mutually terminated on 21 November 2020. On 27 December 2020, Bruto joined Sheikh Russel KC as Assistant Coach cum Fitness Coach. He was earlier fitness coach of The Cong-Viettel FC in the V.League 1 in Vietnam.

== Coaching career ==
Bruto da Costa started his professional coaching journey with Salgaocar FC U18 team in 2001 and moved onto the Technical Director role in 2008 before leaving charge for the India U19 team assistant manager role in 2010.

Bruto has been with the youth groups of India team since 2010 with U19 and U16 teams, until in 2016 when he joined Indian Super League side NorthEast United FC as the assistant manager under Portuguese manager Nelo Vingada. He followed Nelo to Malaysia as the assistant manager in 2017 before moving to Sheikh Russel KC of the Bangladesh Premier League.

On 30 July 2020, Bruto joined East Bengal FC as the assistant manager. The contract was mutually terminated on 21 November 2020.

On 27 December 2020, Bruto joined Bangladesh Premier League side Sheikh Russel KC as assistant manager cum fitness coach.

On 26 September 2021, Bruto da Costa was appointed as the technical assistant of the Egypt national football team on recommendation from Nelo Vingada, who has been appointed as Egypt's strategic advisor and technical director.

== Geno Football Club ==
Geno Football Club announced Francisco Bruto da Costa as the Head Coach on 1 June 2025. Known for his focus on player development and tactical discipline, he has previously contributed to the growth of football in India through roles with national teams and professional clubs. His appointment at Geno FC was described as "a bold step forward in our club’s evolution" by team owner Sagar Salgaocar.
