= Government Physical Education College, Dhaka =

Physical education college in Bangladesh

Coordinates: 23.754021°N 90.363986°E

- Motto: Mens sana in corpore sano
- Type: Physical Education College
- Established: 1954
- Academic staff: 10
- Administrative staff: 65
- Location: Dhaka, Bangladesh
- Campus: Mohammadpur

Government Physical Education College, Dhaka (Bengali: সরকারী শারীরিক শিক্ষা কলেজ, ঢাকা, romanized: Shorkari Sharirik Shikkha College, Dhaka) is a physical education college in Bangladesh.

== History ==
The first physical education college was established in 1954 in Gouripur Rajbari not far off Mymensingh district in Bangladesh. After that in 1955 the college was settled in Armanitola in Dhaka and then it shifted at Darfin hostel of Narinda and Aliya Madrassa. At last finally in 1962 the college was moved permanently at Mohammadpur in Dhaka as the first Government Physical Education College in Bangladesh.

== Facilities ==
The Government Physical Education College is a full residential academic institute. It is situated in 7.90 acre land area. There are two student hostels (one for male and another for females), a staff residential building, an administrative building, a college building, a 400-meter running track, a swimming pool, a basketball ground, and a gymnasium at the college. All indoor, outdoor games facilities are available at the college campus. Now the Government Physical Education College is providing both the Bachelor of Physical Education (B.P.Ed) Degree and Master of Physical Education (M.P.Ed) Degree.

Government Physical Education College, Dhaka is under National University of Bangladesh. All educational and teaching activities are conducted in English at the college.

== Recent activities ==
58th Batch is completing there course. Total students are 208.

== See also ==
- Government Physical Education College, Mymensingh
