= Fortis FC Reserves and Academy =

Bangladeshi Association football club

- Full name: Fortis FC Limited Reserves and Academy
- Founded: 2020; 6 years ago
- Ground: Fortis Sports Ground
- Owner: Fortis Group
- President: Shahin Hasan
- Head Coach: Atiqur Rahman Meshu
- League: Bangladesh Championship League
- 2022–23: 8th of 11
Home colours	Away colours

Fortis FC Reserves and Academy are the reserve team and youth system of the Dhaka based Bangladesh Premier League club Fortis FC. The youth team consists of an under-18 men's team that currently competes in the BFF U18 Football League, the highest level of youth football in Bangladesh organised by the Bangladesh Football Federation. A combination of the youth and reserve team players compete in the country's second-tier professional league, the Bangladesh Championship League, under the name Fortis Football Academy.

== Facilities ==
Since its inception in 2020, Fortis FC built an academy which accommodates prospects in three age categories: Under-16, Under- 18 and Under-20. The academy is located at Fortis Ground in Badda, Dhaka.

The Fortis Ground in Badda, Dhaka and the BKSP football ground are the two main training centers/pitches used by the academy and reserves team. The Fortis Ground currently boasts a resort, consisting of a gym and a swimming pool, open to both senior and junior players.

== Under-20 and Reserves ==
=== History ===
On July 29, 2022, Fortis FC posted on social media that they will select players from three categories (U-16, 18 & 20) for their academy through open trials. The post with the headlines "ফুটবলার হতে চাও?" (lit. 'Want to be a footballer?') got massive responses from all over the country. The first trials in Dhaka, were held for three days straight starting from 5 August 2022. About 6,000 players from all over the country participated at the trials, from which 250 people were initially selected, a number which was further reduced by the selection committee consisting of former Bangladesh national team players Mamunul Islam and Atiqur Rahman Meshu. It was also reported that numerous players who travelled to the capital in order to partake in the trial spent the night at railway stations. The trial's at the M. A. Aziz Stadium in Chittagong later on that month, saw another 160 players from 4,000 participants being selected. After witnessing the success of the countrywide trial, the club president Shahin Hassan expressed his desire to have their Academy and Reserve players take part in the second tier, the Bangladesh Championship League.

On 30 November 2022, it was confirmed that the Fortis Football Academy will take part in the 2022–23 Bangladesh Championship League, making Fortis FC only the second top-tier club after Saif Sporting Club (Youth Team) to have their Academy and Reserve team play in a professional football league.

=== Current squad ===
As of 10 January 2023.

Note: Flags indicate national team as defined under FIFA eligibility rules; some limited exceptions apply. Players may hold more than one non-FIFA nationality.

No.	Pos.	Nation	Player
1	GK	BAN	Miraj Hawladar
2	DF	BAN	Mohammed Mominur Fokir
3	DF	BAN	Alomgir Hossain
4	DF	BAN	Jiaul Hasan
5	DF	BAN	Md. Nasir Sheikh
6	MF	BAN	Md. Rasel
7	MF	BAN	Oahidur Rahman Sydu
8	MF	BAN	Sadman Shakib
9	FW	BAN	Mohammad Robiul Hossain Akib
10	FW	BAN	Rahmat Jisan Ullah (captain)
11	FW	BAN	Khandokar Sharifur Rahman
12	MF	BAN	Swamong Singh Marma
13	DF	BAN	Kamacai Marma Aky
14	MF	BAN	Taohid Hossain Noman

No.	Pos.	Nation	Player
15	DF	BAN	Shakim Mia
16	MF	BAN	Rabid Das
17	FW	BAN	Naky Chandra Das
18	DF	BAN	Kamran Ahmed
19	DF	BAN	Md. Kamrul Hasan
20	FW	BAN	Md. Sabbir Hossain Mollah
21	MF	BAN	Md. Foysal
22	GK	BAN	Md. Antor Ali
23	MF	BAN	Md. Ibrahim
24	DF	BAN	Imran Ahmed
26	DF	BAN	Bijoy Ahammod
27	FW	BAN	Md. Arif Hossain Masud
28	MF	BAN	Md. Moin Uddin
30	GK	BAN	Riaz Ahmed Pial

=== Competitive record ===
As of 3 June 2023.

Season	Division	League								Top league scorer(s)	
Season	Division	P	W	D	L	GF	GA	Pts	Position	Player	Goals
2022–23	Bangladesh Championship League	20	5	7	8	16	22	22	8th	(Bangladesh) Rahmat Jisan Ullah	12

=== Head coach records ===
As of 18 April 2023

Head Coach	From	To	P	W	D	L	GF	GA	%W
(Bangladesh) Atiqur Rahman Meshu	21 September 2022	Present	20	5	7	8	16	22	25.00

=== Team management ===
As of 9 January 2022.

Position	Name
Head coach	(Bangladesh) Atiqur Rahman Meshu
Team Manager	(Bangladesh) Didarul Haque
Team Leader	(Bangladesh) AM Jahangir Alam
Physiotherapist	(Bangladesh) Nujaim Khan Pranto
Equipment Manager	(Bangladesh) Abdul Mannan Shamim
Media Officer	(Bangladesh) Mohammed Ainul Islam
Security Officer	(Bangladesh) Juwel Ahmed
Masseur	(Bangladesh) Md. Akbar

== Youth and academy ==
=== Under-16 ===
In November 2022, Fortis FC Under-16 team took part in the inaugural edition of the BFF U-16 Football Tournament. They were knocked out of the semi-final of the tournament by Wari Club U-16.

=== Competitive record ===
Season	Tournament	Result	Top scorer(s)	Goals
2021–22	BFF U-16 Football Tournament	Semi-finals	Abu Bokkor Siddik	6

=== Team management ===
As of 3 June 2023.

Position	Name
Head coach	(Bangladesh) Atiqur Rahman Meshu
Team Manager	(Bangladesh) Didarul Haque

=== Head coach records ===
As of 21 September 2022

Head Coach	From	To	P	W	D	L	GF	GA	%W
(Bangladesh) Atiqur Rahman Meshu	21 September 2022	Present	6	3	2	1	26	6	50.00
