= Dhanmondi Sports Club =

Association football club based in Dhaka

- Full name: Dhanmondi Sports Club
- Nicknames: Yellow Fear (Bengali: হলুদ আতঙ্ক)
- Founded: 1962; 64 years ago (as Dhanmondi Club); 2010; 16 years ago (renamed as Lt. Sheikh Jamal Dhanmondi Club Limited); May 8, 2026; 6 months ago (renamed as Dhanmondi Sports Club)
- Ground: Sheikh Fazlul Haque Mani Stadium
- Capacity: 5,000
- Chairman: Safwan Sobhan
- Manager: Vacant
- League: Bangladesh Championship League
- 2026–27: TBD
- Website: bashundharagroup.com
Home colours	Away colours

Dhanmondi Sports Club (Bengali:ধানমন্ডি স্পোর্টস ক্লাব) is a professional football club based in the Dhanmondi area, Dhaka, Bangladesh. The club competes in the Bangladesh Football League, the top-flight of football in Bangladesh. It was previously known as Dhanmondi Club before adding the founder's name after turning into a limited company. Dhanmondi Sports Club is one of the most successful football clubs in Bangladesh.

== History ==
Dhanmondi Club took control of its current ground in Dhanmondi in 1962 when it was established. In 2004, the President of Dhanmondi Club and vice-president of Bangladesh Football Federation, Khairul Anwar Piaru was shot dead inside the club premises. In 2007, a court in Dhaka sentenced five people to death for his murder. In 2009, the club was renamed Lt. Sheikh Jamal Dhanmondi Club after Sheikh Jamal, a brother of Prime Minister Sheikh Hasina. The club's occupation of the playground has been protested by Bangladesh Poribesh Abndolon, Bangladesh Environmental Lawyers Association, and Institute of Architects, Bangladesh. The club promised to play quality football when called up to the Bangladesh Premier League in 2010–11 season directly from the Dhaka Second Division League. The club was crowned champions in their inaugural season in the professional league.

On 22 August 2024, Sheikh Jamal and Sheikh Russel withdrew from the BPL due to the withdrawal of their sponsor Bashundhara Group.

== Shirt sponsors ==
Period	Shirt sponsor
2010–2014	United Commercial Bank (UCB)
2015	Bashundhara Group
2016	Yellow
2018–	Bashundhara A4 Paper

== Stadium ==
Lt. Sheikh Jamal Dhanmondi Club wanted to use Faridpur Stadium as a their home Stadium for the 2018–19 Bangladesh Premier League however they had to play all of their matches at the Bangabandhu National Stadium which is in the Motijheel area in the heart of the city. The stadium had a capacity of close to 55,000 before the work of renovation, making it then the largest stadium of the country. After the renovation, it still remains the largest stadium of the country.

== Current squad ==
As of 29 March 2024

Note: Flags indicate national team as defined under FIFA eligibility rules; some limited exceptions apply. Players may hold more than one non-FIFA nationality.

No.	Pos.	Nation	Player
1	GK	BAN	Ishaque Akonddo
2	DF	BAN	Monjurur Rahman Manik
3	DF	BAN	Rajib Hossain
4	DF	BAN	Mohamed Atikuzzaman
5	DF	BAN	Tareq Miah
6	MF	BAN	Abu Shaeid
8	MF	BAN	Mohammad Abdullah
10	MF	BRA	Higor Leite (Vice-captain)
11	FW	BAN	Sazzad Hossain
12	MF	BAN	Kaushik Barua
13	MF	BAN	Atiqur Rahman Fahad (Captain)
14	MF	BAN	Akkas Ali
15	DF	BAN	Shakil Hossain
16	MF	UZB	Shakhzod Shaymanov
17	FW	BAN	Foysal Ahmed Fahim
18	MF	BAN	Jayed Ahmed
19	FW	BAN	Piash Ahmed Nova
20	DF	BAN	Md Taj Uddin

No.	Pos.	Nation	Player
21	DF	BAN	Shakil Ahmed
22	GK	BAN	Md Billal Hossain
23	DF	BAN	Joynal Abedin Dipu
24	DF	BAN	Md Alfaj Mia
27	MF	BAN	Md Arifur Rahman Shemanto
29	FW	SEN	Abou Touré
33	DF	BAN	Md Sumon Ahmed
36	GK	BAN	Hamidur Rahman Remon
37	FW	BAN	Mehedi Hasan Hridoy
44	MF	BAN	Md Alamgir
50	FW	GHA	Philip Adjah
55	FW	BAN	Al Amin
66	DF	BAN	Mahamudul Hasan Kiron
77	FW	BAN	Fayed Azim Ifty
88	MF	BAN	Md Afnan Ishraq
93	DF	UZB	Shokhrukhbek Kholmatov
99	GK	BAN	Mahfuz Hasan Pritom

== Current Technical Staff ==
As of 30 January 2024

Position	Name
Head coach	Vacant
Assistant coach	Vacant
Goalkeeping coach	(Bangladesh) Nazmul Karim Badal
Team Manager	(Bangladesh) Faraz Hossain
Trainer	Vacant
Physio	(Bangladesh) Goljer Ahmed
Video Analyst	(Bangladesh) Nasif Islam
Media Manager	(Bangladesh) Mehady Hasan Redoy

=== Coaches ===
- (Serbia) Zoran Kraljevic (17 September 2010 – 28 December 2010)
- (Sri Lanka) Pakir Ali (18 January 2011 – 2011)
- (Bangladesh) Saiful Bari Titu (15 August 2011 – February 2012)
- (Bangladesh) Mohammad Abu Yousuf (17 February 2012 – 2012)
- (Nigeria) Joseph Afusi (2012 – 28 May 2014)
- (The Gambia) Omar Sisse^ (25 May 2013 – June 2013)
- (Bangladesh) Maruful Haque (14 June 2014 – 27 May 2015)
- (Nigeria) Joseph Afusi (18 June 2015 – 23 August 2015)
- (Bangladesh) Shafiqul Islam Manik (9 February 2016 – 19 July 2016)
- (Sweden) Stefan Hansson (19 September 2016 – 2016)
- (Bangladesh) Kazi Jasimuddin Ahmed Joshi (November 2016– 31 December 2016)
- (Nigeria) Joseph Afusi (12 April 2017 – 14 November 2017)
- (Bangladesh) Mahabub Hossain Roksy (15 November 2017 – 5 February 2018)
- (Nigeria) Joseph Afusi (7 May 2018 – 18 April 2019)
- (Bangladesh) Shafiqul Islam Manik (2 May 2019 – 9 August 2021)
- (Bangladesh) Mosharraf Hossain Badal (9 August 2021 – 27 August 2021)
- (Spain) Juan Manuel Martínez Sáez (November 2021 – 9 April 2022)
- (Nigeria) Joseph Afusi (10 April 2021 –10 October 2022)
- (Bangladesh) Maruful Haque (14 October 2022 – 1 August 2023)
- (North Macedonia) Marjan Sekulovski (31 August 2023 – 30 January 2024)
- (India) Francisco Bruto Da Costa (‡) (4 December 2023 – 14 January 2024)
- (Bangladesh) Saifur Rahman Moni (‡) (15 January 2024 – 30 January 2024)
- (Bangladesh) Zulfiker Mahmud Mintu (30 January 2024 – 30 May 2024)

=== Football Committee Chairman ===
Ashraf Uddin Ahmed Chunnu

== Notable players ==
- The players below had senior international cap(s) for their respective countries. Players whose name is listed, represented their countries before or after playing for Sheikh Jamal Dhanmondi Club.

=== Africa ===
- (Nigeria) Emmanuel Ariwachukwu (2012–2013)
- (The Gambia) Pa Omar Jobe (2017–2022)
- (The Gambia) Ebou Kanteh (2018–2019)
- (Nigeria) Stanley Dimgba (2023–present)

=== North America ===
- (Haiti) Sony Norde (2013–2014)
- (Haiti) Wedson Anselme (2013–2016)
- (Saint Vincent and the Grenadines) Cornelius Stewart (2022–2023)

== Team records ==
=== Head coach's record ===
As of 29 May 2024

Coach	From	To	P	W	D	L	GS	GA	%W
(Sri Lanka) Pakir Ali	18 January 2011	2011	18	14	4	0	39	10	77.78
(Bangladesh) Maruful Haque	14 June 2014	27 May 2015	30	23	4	3	81	31	76.67
(Bangladesh) Shafiqul Islam Manik	9 February 2016	19 July 2016	15	6	1	8	28	33	40.00
(Bangladesh) Mahabub Hossain Roksy	15 November 2017	5 February 2018	14	7	4	3	28	20	50.00
(Nigeria) Joseph Afusi	7 May 2018	18 April 2019	19	5	8	6	19	24	26.32
(Bangladesh) Shafiqul Islam Manik	2 May 2019	8 August 2021	40	19	10	11	77	63	47.50
(Bangladesh) Mosharraf Hossain Badal	9 August 2021	27 August 2021	6	4	1	1	10	4	66.67
(Spain) Juan Manuel Martínez Sáez	November 2021	9 April 2022	18	8	8	2	28	24	44.44
(Nigeria) Joseph Afusi	13 April 2022	2 August 2022	11	4	2	5	14	19	36.36
(Bangladesh) Maruful Haque	25 October 2022	August 2023	28	7	11	10	39	46	25.00
(North Macedonia) Marjan Sekulovski	31 August 2023	30 January 2024	3	1	1	1	5	2	33.33
(India) Francisco Bruto Da Costa ‡	4 December 2023	14 January 2024	3	1	0	2	2	3	33.33
(Bangladesh) Saifur Rahman Moni ‡	15 January 2024	30 January 2024	3	2	0	1	6	4	66.67
(Bangladesh) Zulfiker Mahmud Mintu	30 January 2024	30 May 2024	14	2	6	6	10	20	14.29

‡– Caretaker ^– Interim P – Total of played matches W – Won matches D – Drawn matches L – Lost matches GS – Goal scored GA – Goals against
%W – Percentage of matches won

=== All time top scorer ===
Ranking	Name	Years	Goals
1	(The Gambia) Solomon King Kanform	2018-22	48
2	(The Gambia) Pa Omar Jobe	2017-22	25
3	(Uzbekistan) Otabek Valizhonov	2020-23	20
4	(The Gambia) Suleiman Sillah	2020-23	17
5	(Nigeria) Raphael Odovin Onwrebe	2017-18	15

== Honours ==
=== Winners ===
- Bangladesh Premier League (3)

2010–11, 2013–14, 2014–15

- (Bangladesh) Dhaka Second Division League

1978

- (Bangladesh) Dhaka Third Division League

1968

- (Bangladesh) Federation Cup (3)

2011–12, 2013–14, 2014–15

- (Nepal) Budha Subba Gold Cup

2002

- (Nepal) Pokhara Cup

2011

- (Bhutan) Kings Cup

2014

=== Runners-up ===
- (Bangladesh) Dhaka First Division League

1999

- Bangladesh Premier League (2)

2012–13, 2020–21

- (Bangladesh) Federation Cup (2)

2010–11, 2012–13

- (Bangladesh) Independence Cup (1)

2012–13

- (India) IFA Shield (Note: Fourth oldest club competition, organized by the IFA (W.B.) and played between local clubs of West Bengal and other invited ones.)

2014

== Performance in AFC competitions ==
Sheikh Jamal Dhanmondi Club have qualified for continental competition on two occasions.

=== 2012 AFC President's Cup ===
The first was in 2012 when they qualified for the third-tier AFC President's Cup. However, before the tournament started they withdrew, citing security concern of playing in Pakistan.

=== 2016 AFC Cup ===
Four years later, having won the 2013–14 Bangladesh Football Premier League, they qualified for the 2016 AFC Cup. In the qualifying round, they were drawn in Group A along with hosts Alga Bishkek from Kyrgyzstan and Benfica de Macau. They beat Benfica de Macau 4–1 in their opening game and then drew with hosts Alga to qualify for the group stage without having to go through the playoff round due to a lack of teams in the east region. They were drawn against Tampines Rovers from Singapore, Ceres from the Philippines and Selangor from Malaysia.

== Club records ==
- Transfer Record (paid): $175k to air force for Solomon King Kanform in 2017
- $75 thousand to Sheikh Russel KC for Sony Norde in 2013.
- Local Highest Transfer Record : Monthly 350,000 Tk to Jamal Bhuyan for 2014–15 season.

== See also ==
- Sheikh Jamal Dhanmondi Club cricket team
