= List of Bashundhara Kings players =

This is the list of players who have played for Bashundhara Kings since its inception in 2013.

== Current squad ==
As of 26 November 2022

Note: Flags indicate national team as defined under FIFA eligibility rules; some limited exceptions apply. Players may hold more than one non-FIFA nationality.

No.	Pos.	Nation	Player
1	GK	BAN	Anisur Rahman Zico (3rd captain)
36	GK	BAN	Hamidur Rahman Remon
25	GK	BAN	Sultan Shakil
27	GK	BAN	Mehedi Hasan
2	DF	BAN	Yeasin Arafat
3	DF	IRI	Reza Khanzadeh
4	DF	BAN	Topu Barman (captain)
5	DF	BAN	Tutul Hossain Badsha
40	DF	BAN	Tariq Kazi
55	DF	BAN	Mohammed Atikuzzaman
71	DF	BAN	Rimon Hossain
12	DF	BAN	Bishwanath Ghosh
66	DF	BAN	Mahamudul Hasan Kiron
22	DF	BAN	Md Saad Uddin
72	DF	BAN	Rabiul Islam

No.	Pos.	Nation	Player
77	MF	UZB	Asror Gofurov
7	MF	BAN	Masuk Mia Jony
13	MF	BAN	Atiqur Rahman Fahad
15	MF	BAN	Biplu Ahmed
17	MF	BAN	Sohel Rana
24	MF	BRA	Miguel Figueira
33	MF	BAN	Shekh Morsalin
52	MF	BAN	Md Sabbir Hossen
29	FW	BAN	Motin Mia
20	FW	BAN	Rakib Hossain
99	FW	BAN	Sumon Reza
10	FW	BRA	Robinho (vice-captain)
11	FW	BAN	Tawhidul Alam Sabuz
9	FW	BRA	Dorielton

=== Out on loan ===
Note: Flags indicate national team as defined under FIFA eligibility rules; some limited exceptions apply. Players may hold more than one non-FIFA nationality.

No.	Pos.	Nation	Player
—	FW	BAN	Piash Ahmmed Nova (On loan at Sheikh Jamal DC)

== List of players ==
- Appearances and goals are for Bangladesh Football Premier League matches only.

Statistics correct as of match played 28 February 2021

Table headers

- Nationality – If a player played international football, the country/countries he played for are shown. Otherwise, the player's nationality is given as their country of birth.
- Bashundhara Kings career – The year of the player's first appearance for Bashundhara Kings to the year of his last appearance.

Positions key
GK	Goalkeeper
DF	Defender
MF	Midfielder
FW	Forward
U	Utility player^{1}

List of Bashundhara Kings players
Name	Nationality	Position	Bashundhara Kings career	Appearances	Goals	Ref						
Name	Nationality	Position	Bashundhara Kings career	Appearances	Goals	Ref	Mitul Hossain	Bangladesh	GK	2018–present	4	0
Sushanto Tripura	Bangladesh	DF	2018–present	20	1							
Nurul Naium Faisal	Bangladesh	DF	2018–present	16	1							
Rezaul Karim	Bangladesh	DF	2018–2019	12	0							
Didarul Hoque	Bangladesh	DF	2018–2019	1	0							
Emon Mahmud Babu	Bangladesh	MF	2018–present	25	1							
Masuk Mia Jony	Bangladesh	MF	2018–present	34	0							
Hemanta Vincent Biswas	Bangladesh	MF	2018–2019	10	0							
Motin Mia	Bangladesh	FW	2018–present	33	11							
Tawhidul Alam Sabuz	Bangladesh	FW	2018–present	31	5							
Mahbubur Rahman Sufil	Bangladesh	FW	2018–present	32	1							
Saddam Hossain Anny	Bangladesh	DF	2018–2019	5	0							
Krishno Kumar	Bangladesh	MF	2018–2019	0	0							
Ridwan Bin Rahman Rakin	Bangladesh	DF	2018–2019	–	–							
Mohammad Salauddin	Bangladesh	DF	2018–2019	0	0							
Sheikh Alamgir Kabir Rana	Bangladesh	MF	2018–present	29	2							
Mohammad Ibrahim	Bangladesh	MF	2018–present	35	4							
Bakhtiyar Duyshobekov	Kyrgyzstan	MF	2018–2020	29	9							
Soeb Mia	Bangladesh	DF	2018–2019	0	0							
Anisur Rahman Zico	Bangladesh	GK	2018–present	40	0							
Sohanur Rahman	Bangladesh	MF	2018–2019	2	0							
Daniel Colindres	Costa Rica	FW	2018–2020	29	15							
Mohammad Shamim	Bangladesh	MF	2018–2019	0	0							
Nayeem Uddin	Bangladesh	MF	2018–2019	4	0							
Nasiruddin Chowdhury	Bangladesh	DF	2018–2019	20	3							
Jorge Gotor	Spain	DF	2018–2019	7	0							
Rakibul Hasan Tusher	Bangladesh	GK	2018–2019	0	0							
Willis Plaza	Trinidad and Tobago	FW	2018–2019	0	0							
Rokonuzzaman Kanchan (Note: Kanchan represented Bashundhara Kings in 2018 Independence Cup)	Bangladesh	FW	2018–2019	0	0							
Rakibul Islam	Bangladesh	MF	2018–2019	0	0							
Bishal Das	Bangladesh	FW	2018–2019	2	0							
Salauddin Shaikh	Bangladesh	MF	2018–2019	0	0							
Sanowar Hossain	Bangladesh	MF	2018–2019	1	0							
Marcos Vinícius	Brazil	FW	2018–2019	24	14							
Nur Mohammad	Bangladesh	GK	2018–2019	0	0							
Maksudur Rahman Mostak	Bangladesh	GK	2018–2020	0	0							
Nurul Karim	Bangladesh	GK	2018–2019	0	0							
Mohamad Jalal Kdouh (Note: Kdouh represented Bashundhara Kings in 2019–20 Bangladesh Federation Cup)	Lebanon	FW	2019–2020	0	0							
Eleta Kingsley (Note: Kingsley represented Bashundhara Kings in 2019 Sheikh Kamal International Club Cup)	Nigeria	FW	2019–2020	0	0							
Hamidur Rahman Remon	Bangladesh	GK	2019–present	0	0							
Yeasin Khan	Bangladesh	DF	2019–present	12	0							
Topu Barman	Bangladesh	DF	2019–present	14	0							
Bishwanath Ghosh	Bangladesh	DF	2019–present	17	0							
Jahangir Alam Sajeeb	Bangladesh	DF	2019–2020	0	0							
Nicolas Delmonte	Argentina	DF	2019–2020	5	1							
Tariq Kazi	Bangladesh	DF	2019–present	7	0							
Foayej Ahammed Peash	Bangladesh	DF	2019–2020	0	0							
Akhtam Nazarov	Tajikistan	DF	2019–2020	6	1							
Hakim Biswas	Bangladesh	DF	2019–2020	0	0							
Umor Faruq Mithu	Bangladesh	DF	2019–2020	0	0							
Biplu Ahmed	Bangladesh	MF	2019–present	15	0							
Atiqur Rahman Fahad	Bangladesh	MF	2019–present	4	0							
Robiul Hasan	Bangladesh	MF	2019–2021	1	0							
Fahim Morshed	Bangladesh	MF	2019–present	0	0							
Rasel Ahmed	Bangladesh	FW	2019–2021	1	0							
Rimon Hossain	Bangladesh	DF	2019–present	17	0							
Nihat Jaman Ucchash	Bangladesh	FW	2019–2020	0	0							
Hernan Barcos (Note: Barcos represented Bashundhara Kings in 2020 AFC Cup)	Argentina	FW	2020	0	0							
Fernandes	Brazil	MF	2020–present	10	2							
Raúl Becerra	Argentina	FW	2020–present	12	11							
Robinho	Brazil	FW	2020–present	12	12							
Mehedi Hasan	Bangladesh	GK	2020–present	0	0							
Khaled Shafiei	Iran	DF	2020–present	12	1							
Md Tareq Miah	Bangladesh	DF	2020–present	0	0							
Mahdi Khan	Bangladesh	MF	2020–present	0	0							
