= List of Bashundhara Kings records and statistics =

The Bashundhara Kings is a professional football club based in Bashundhara Residential Area, Dhaka, Bangladesh.

== History ==
Bashundhara Kings played their first match in 2017 against Uttar Baridhara SC. They won their first-ever title in the same year, lifting 2017 Bangladesh Championship League.

== Major titles ==
=== League ===
- Bangladesh Premier League
  - Winners (1): 2018–19
- Bangladesh Championship League
  - Winners (1): 2017–18

=== Cup ===
- Bangladesh Federation Cup
  - Winners (1): 2019–20
- Independence Cup
  - Winners (1): 2018–19

== Goalscoring records ==
=== Top scorers in Premier League ===
As of 20 September 2021

Ranking	Nationality	Name	Years	Goals
1	Brazil	Robson Azevedo da Silva	2020–present	21
2	Argentina	Raúl Becerra	2020–present	16
3	Costa Rica	Daniel Colindres	2018–2020	15
4	Brazil	Marcos Vinícius	2018–2019	14
5	Bangladesh	Motin Mia	2018–present	11

=== Top scorers in Federation Cup ===
As of 10 January 2021

Ranking	Nationality	Name	Years	Goals
1	Costa Rica	Daniel Colindres	2018–2020	8
2	Argentina	Raúl Becerra	2020–present	5
3	Brazil	Marcos Vinícius	2018–2019	3
4	Bangladesh	Motin Mia	2018–present	2
5	Bangladesh	Tawhidul Alam Sabuz	2018–present	2
6	Lebanon	Mohamad Jalal Kdouh	2019–2020	2

=== Top scorers in Independence Cup ===
As of 26 December 2018

Ranking	Nationality	Name	Years	Goals
1	Bangladesh	Motin Mia	2018–present	2
2	Kyrgyzstan	Bakhtiyar Duyshobekov	2018–2020	2
3	Bangladesh	Nasiruddin Chowdhury	2018–2019	1
4	Brazil	Marcos Vinícius	2018–2019	1
5	Costa Rica	Daniel Colindres	2018–2020	1

=== Top scorers in AFC Cup ===
As of 11 March 2020

Ranking	Nationality	Name	Years	Goals
1	Argentina	Hernán Barcos	2020	4
2	Costa Rica	Daniel Colindres	2018–2020	1
2	Bangladesh	Mohammad Ibrahim	2018–2023	1

=== Top scorers in Sheikh Kamal Club Cup ===
As of 26 October 2019

Ranking	Nationality	Name	Years	Goals
1	Lebanon	Mohamad Jalal Kdouh	2019–2020	3
2	Bangladesh	Motin Mia	2018–present	1
3	Costa Rica	Daniel Colindres	2018–2020	1
4	Kyrgyzstan	Bakhtiyar Duyshobekov	2018–2020	1

== Clean sheets ==
As of 20 September 2020

Rank	Player	Years	Clean sheets
1	(Bangladesh) Anisur Rahman Zico	2018–present	25
2	(Bangladesh) Mitul Hossain	2018–present	

Bangladesh Premier League only.

== Head coach's records ==
As of 2 July 2020

- First Head Coach: (Bangladesh) S. M. Asifuzzaman, from August 2017 to November 2017.
- Longest-serving Head Coach by time: (Spain) Óscar Bruzón, from 5 September 2018 to Present (1 year, 9 months, 28 days).
- Longest-serving Head Coach by matches: (Spain) Óscar Bruzón managed the club for 51 matches over a period of 1 year and nine months, from September 2018 to Present.

== Player records ==
=== Goalscorers ===
As of 20 September 2021

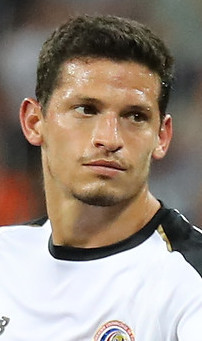
Colindres is the current top scorer of the club

- Most goals in all competitions:: (Costa Rica) Daniel Colindres, 26.
- Most league goals: (Brazil) Robson Azevedo da Silva, 21.
- Most Federation Cup goals: (Costa Rica) Daniel Colindres, 8.
- Most Independence Cup goals: (Bangladesh) Motin Mia & (Kyrgyzstan) Bakhtiyar Duyshobekov, 2.
- Most Continental goals: (Argentina) Hernan Barcos, 4.
- First player to score for Bashundhara: (Bangladesh) Ripon Biswas (against Uttar Baridhara SC, 7 August 2017).
- Most goals in a season: (Brazil) Robson Azevedo da Silva, 24 (during the 2020–21 season).
- Most goals in a debut season: (Brazil) Robson Azevedo da Silva, 24 (during the 2020–21 season).
- Most league goals in a season: (Brazil) Robson Azevedo da Silva, 21 (during the 2020–21 season).
- Most continental goals in a season: (Argentina) Hernan Barcos, 4.
- Most hat-tricks: 5 Players, 1.
- Fastest hat-trick: (Costa Rica) Daniel Colindres, 13 minutes, (against Team BJMC, 11 November 2018).
- Highest-scoring substitute in Premier League: (Bangladesh) Tawhidul Alam Sabuz, 3.
- Most games without scoring for an outfield player in Premier League: (Bangladesh) Masuk Mia Jony, 40.
- Youngest goalscorer: (Bangladesh) Arif Hossain, 16 years (2017).
- Oldest goalscorer: (Argentina) Hernan Barcos, 35 years, 11 months, 1 day (against TC Sports Club, 11 March 2020).

== Club records ==
=== Matches ===
==== Firsts ====
- First Match: Bashundhara Kings 2–2 Uttar Baridhara SC, 7 August 2017.
- First Premier League Match: Bashundhara Kings 1–0 Sheikh Jamal Dhanmondi Club, 19 January 2019.
- First Federation Cup Match: Bashundhara Kings 5–2 Dhaka Mohammedan, 29 October 2018.
- First Independence Cup Match: Bashundhara Kings 2–0 Sheikh Jamal Dhanmondi Club, 2 December 2018.
- First AFC Cup Match: Bashundhara Kings 5–1 TC Sports Club, 11 March 2020.

==== Wins ====
- Record win: Bashundhara Kings 5–0 Brothers Union, 16 July 2019.
- Record Premier League win: Bashundhara Kings 5–0 Brothers Union, 16 July 2019.
- Record Federation Cup win: Bashundhara Kings 5–1 Team BJMC, 11 November 2018.
- Record Independence Cup win: Bashundhara Kings 2–0 Sheikh Jamal Dhanmondi Club, 2 December 2018.
- Most league wins in a season:

20 wins from 24 games (during the 2018–19 season).

- Fewest league wins in a season:

3 wins from 6 games (during the 2019–20 season).

==== Defeats ====
- Record defeat: 1–5 against NoFeL Sporting Club in BCL, 14 October 2017.
- Record defeat at Sheikh Kamal Stadium: 3–4 against Chittagong Abahani in final, 15 March 2020.
- Record-scoring defeat: 3–4 against Chittagong Abahani in final, 15 March 2020.
- Record Federation Cup defeat: 1–3 against Dhaka Abahani in final, 23 November 2018.
- Record Independence Cup defeat:
- Most league defeats in a season:

2 defeats from 6 games (during the 2019–20 season).

- Fewest defeats in a season:

1 defeat from 24 games (during the 2018–19 season).

==== Record consecutive results ====
- Record consecutive wins: 14 (24 February 2019 to 16 July 2019).
- Record consecutive league wins: 14 (24 February 2019 to 16 July 2019).
- Record consecutive league wins from start of season: 5 (during the 2018–19 season).
- Record consecutive defeats:
- Record consecutive league matches without a defeat: 20 (from 18 January 2019 to 16 July 2019).
- Record consecutive home league wins: 11 (from 23 January 2019 to 16 July 2019).
- Record consecutive draws:
- Record consecutive home matches without defeat:
- Record consecutive home league matches without defeat: 13 (from 23 January 2019 to 13 February 2020).
- Record consecutive matches without conceding a goal:

=== Goals ===
- Most league goals scored in a season: 54 in 24 games (during the 2018–19 season).
- Fewest league goals scored in a season: 10 in 6 games (during the 2019–20 season).
- Most league goals conceded in a season: 14 in 24 games (during the 2018–19 season).
- Fewest league goals conceded in a season: 9 in 6 games (during the 2019–20 season).
- Most consecutive league matches with a Kings goal:
- Most consecutive league matches with a Kings goal since the start of a season:

=== Points ===
- Most points in a season:

Three points for a win: 63 (in 24 games in 2018–19).

- Fewest points in a season:

Three points for a win: 10 (in 6 games in 2019–20).

== Continental Record ==
AFC Cup
Season	Round	Nat	Club	Home Leg	Away Leg	Aggregate	Highest Scorer
2020	Group Stage	(Maldives)	TC Sports Club	5–1			(Argentina) Hernan Barcos (4 goals)
2020	Group Stage	(Maldives)	Maziya S&RC				(Argentina) Hernan Barcos (4 goals)
2020	Group Stage	(India)	Chennai City FC				(Argentina) Hernan Barcos (4 goals)

== AFC Club Ranking History ==
As of 11 March 2020.

Date	Ranking	Points
11 March 2020	141	5.42
