= 2021–22 Bashundhara Kings season =

Bashundhara Kings
2021–22 season
- Owner: Bashundhara Group
- President: Imrul Hassan
- Head coach: Óscar Bruzón
- Stadium: Bashundhara Kings Arena
- Bangladesh Premier League: Winners
- Bangladesh Federation Cup: Did not play
- Independence Cup: Runners-up
- AFC Cup: Group Stage
- Top goalscorer: League: Robinho (16 goals); All: Robinho (20 goals)
- Biggest win: 6–1 Vs Bangladesh Navy (30 November 2021)
- Biggest defeat: 1–2 Vs Swadhinata KS (3 February 2022)
Home colours	Away colours

The 2021–22 season was the Bashundhara Kings's 9th competitive professional season since its creation in 2013, and 4th consecutive season in Bangladesh Premier League, country's top-tier football league. In addition to domestic league, Bashundhara Kings was participated on this season's edition of AFC Cup, Federation Cup and Independence Cup. This season were covered from 1 October 2021 to 30 July 2022.

== Season overview ==
=== November ===
On 30 November Bashundhara Kings has faced Bangladesh Navy football team and thrashed them by 6–0 goals. Stojan Vranješ scored two goals and Fernandes, Robinho Eleta Kingsley one of each an own goal by Habibur Bangladesh Navy.

=== December ===
On 4 December Bashundhara Kings defeated Bangladesh Police FC by 1–0 goal. Winning penalty goal on 16 minutes by Robinho secured the club victory. As a result of this match they have qualified to the knockout stage even though one match remaining.

On 8 December Bashudhara Kings defeated by 3–0 goals Chittagong Abahani. Brazilian forward Robinho on 17 minutes took lead and finished first half. In the second half on 83 minutes goal by Mohammad Ibrahim made scored 2–0 and Motin Mia made it in the 87 minutes 3–0. Bashundhara Kings qualified to the Knockout stage as group champion of 2021–22 Independence Cup (Bangladesh).

On 12 December Bashundhara Kings have beaten 4–0 goals Sheikh Jamal DC. First half both teams played goalless both are played well but their players wouldn't found net. In the second half on 58 minutes Motin Mia open account & Brazilian forward Fernandez two goals on 73, 81 make 3–0. In the additional time 94 minutes Alamgir Kabir Rana made it 4–0. As a result of this match Bashundhara Kings qualified to the Semi-finals.

On 14 December Bashundha Kings defeated Bangladesh Police FC by 2–1 goals. In the 8 minutes Danilo Quipapá scored for Police FC but they couldn't hold it for long. In the 30 minutes Mohammad Ibrahim made it 1–1. In the second half both teams were goalless. End of full time in the extra 30 minutes 119 minutes Yeasin Arafat secured Bashundhara Kings final.

On 18 December Bashundhara Kings lost to Dhaka Abahani by 0–3 goals. Both teams played first half goalless but in the 53rd minute a Rakib Hossain goal took the lead for Dhaka Abahnai. Two more goals scored by Brazilian forward Dorielton on 63 and 72 minutes ensured Dhaka Abahani trophy. Rest of the second half Kings players didn't found any goal.

On 25 December 2021 Bashundhara Kings lost 3–0 by Walkover laws against Swadhinata KS. The match were scheduled to play Versus Swadhinata KS but Kings withdrew their name from the tournament.

On 29 December 2021 Bashundhara Kings lost 3–0 by Walkover laws against Dhaka Mohammedan. The match were scheduled to play Versus Dhaka Mohammedan KS but Kings withdrew their name from the tournament. The match commissioner awarded Dhaka Mohammedan winner of the match.

=== February ===
On 3 February Bashundhara Kings played their home game versus Swadhinata KS and defeated by 1–2 goals. On 25 minutes Nedo Turković penalty goal took lead and on 45+1 minutes goal by Rasel Ahmed made the score 2–0 and go to half time. In the second half time goal on 73 minutes by Tawhidul Alam Sabuz made score 1–2 but Bashundhara Kings players couldn't found the net to score any goals to avoid the loss of the match.

On 7 February Bashundhara Kings won their away match by 1–0 against Uttar Baridhara Club. In the first on 26 minutes a goal by Bosnian forward Stojan Vranješ took the lead Bashundhara Kings till ended of first half. In the second half both team played excellent football but Uttar Baridhara players wouldn't able to score a goal versus Bashundhara Kings. Till the last whistle Bashundhara Kings hold 1–0 goal lead and left the field with 3 points.

On 12 February Bashundhara Kings defeated Muktijoddha Sangsad KC by 1–0 at home. First half both teams played excellent football and finished by 0–0 score. In the second half on 58 minutes Brazilian forward Robson goal took lead Kings and they have finished it 1–0. Muktijoddha SKC players tried to play attacking football but it wasn't not enough to equalized score.

On 17 February Bashundhara Kings defeated 3–0 goals Bangladesh Police FC at home game. In the first halftime both teams played excellent football but no teams has score any goals. In the second half on 66 minutes a goal by Robinho Bashudhara Kings took lead. On 77 minutes penalty goal by Robinho lead the score 2–0. On 82 minutes Police FC Md Eshanur Rahman showed red card and sent off him. On 87 minutes a goal by Eleta Kingsley made scoreline 3–0 and Bashundhara Kings got full three points.

On 22 February Bashundhara Kings won by 3–2 goals against Rahmatganj MFS. In the first half Rahmatganj MFS Nigerian forward Sunday Chizoba goal on 28 minutes took the lead Rahmatganj MFS but between 4 minutes Brazilian Robinho equalized scored 1–1. On 44 minutes Mohammed Ibrahim goal gave lead to Basundhara Kings made score 2–1. In the last minutes of half time second penalty goal by Sunday Chizoba on 45+3 minutes finished halftime with 2–2. In the second half on 75 minutes Yeasin Khan goal secured victory for Bashundhara Kings 3–2.

On 28 February Bashundhara Kings have won by 1–0 goal against Sheikh Russel KC in the away match. In the first half both teams has play competitive football and they have finished 0–0 score first half of the match. In the second part of the match on 83 minutes a penalty goal by Brazilian star Robson goal gave victory for Bashundhara Kings by 1–0 and they have climb on table topper.

=== March ===
On 5 March Bashundhara Kings defeated by 2–0 goals Dhaka Mohammedan at home ground. In the first half on 11 minutes a goal by Sumon Reza and on 19 minutes Brazilian forward Robson Bashundhara Kings made score 2–0 and they have ended first half with leading score 2–0. In the second half on 47 minutes Anik Hossain Dhaka Mohammedan sent off due to bad gesture and foul. Rest of the game Dhaka Mohammedan haven't able to come back in the match and Bashundhara Kings finished the match with 2–0 win.

On 11 March Bashundhara Kings won by 5–0 goals against Chittagong Abahani at home ground.

On 16 March Bashundhara Kings defeated Saif Sporting Club by 4–3 goals at home ground.

=== April ===
On 3 April Bashundhara Kings drew against Dhaka Abahani by 2–2 at in the away game. On 20 minutes Costa Rican forward Daniel Colindres goal got lead Dhaka Abahani 1–0 goal, meanwhile Bashundhara Kings players did not found the net in the first half. In the second half on 64 minutes Eleta Kingsley and Brazilian forward Robson goals got 2–1 goals advantage Bashundhara Kings but on 84 minutes Dorielton goal equalized score 2–2 goals both giants teams satisfied with share points.

On 7 April Bashundhara Kings drew by 3–3 goals against Sheikh Jamal DC at home ground.

On 24 April Bashudhara Kings have defeated by 2–0 goals Swadhinata KS in their away game. In the first half debutant Brazilian forward Miguel Figueira two goals on 28 and 35 minutes got lead Bashundhara Kings and finished half time. In the last 45 minutes both teams play defensive football and Bashundhara Kings took their very first game revenge against Swadhinata KS.

On 28 April Bashundhara Kings have beat Uttar Baridhara Club by 6–0 goals at the home ground.

=== May ===
On 7 May Bashundhara Kings have won over Muktijoddha Sangsad KC by 3–2 in the away game.

On 12 May Bashudhara Kings won versus Bangladesh Police FC by 2–1 goals in the away match.

On 18 May Bashundhara Kings have won versus Maldivian club Maziya S&RC by 1–0 goal in the first group stages match of AFC Cup.

On 21 May Bashundhara Kings have lost against Indian club ATK Mohun Bagan by 0–4 goals in the second match of the group stages of AFC Cup.

On 24 May Bashundhara Kings have got victory versus Indian club Gokulam Kerala by 2–1 goals in their third and last game of group stage 2022 AFC Cup.

=== June ===
On 21 June Bashundhara Kings have won against Rahmatganj MFS by 2–0 in the away game.

On 26 June Bashundhara Kings have won against Sheikh Russel KC by 3–2 goals at home ground.

=== July ===
On 2 July Bashundhara Kings have drew versus Dhaka Mohammedan by 1–1 in the away game.

On 7 July Bashunhara Kings have got victory versus Chittagong Abahani by 1–0 goals in the opponent ground.

On 18 July Bashundhara Kings have won against Saif Sporting Club by 2–0 goals in the away game.

On 25 July Bashundhara Kings have won by 3–2 goals versus Dhaka Abahani at home ground.

On 30 July Bashundhara Kings have won by 1–2 goals versus Sheikh Jamal DC in the away game.

== Players ==
As of 27 November 2021

No.	Nat.	Player	Position(s)	Date Of Birth	Year Signed	Previous club
Goalkeepers
1	(Bangladesh)	Anisur Rahman Zico (3rd captain)	GK	10 August 1997 (age 29)	2018	(Bangladesh) Saif Sporting Club
22	(Bangladesh)	Sultan Ahmed Sakhil	GK	14 September 1990 (age 36)	2021	(Bangladesh) Abahani Ltd. Dhaka
27	(Bangladesh)	Mehedi Hasan	GK	2 January 2004 (age 22)	2020	Youth team
36	(Bangladesh)	Hamidur Rahman Remon	GK	20 October 1990 (age 36)	2019	(Bangladesh) Rahmatganj MFS
Defenders
2	(Bangladesh)	Yeasin Arafat	LB	5 January 2003 (age 23)	2021	(Bangladesh) Saif Sporting Club
3	(Bangladesh)	Mehedi Hasan Mithu	CB	24 October 1994 (age 32)	2021	(Bangladesh) Muktijoddha Sangsad KC
4	(Bangladesh)	Topu Barman (captain)	CB	20 December 1994 (age 31)	2019	(Bangladesh) Abahani Ltd. Dhaka
12	(Bangladesh)	Bishwanath Ghosh	RB	30 May 1999 (age 27)	2019	(Bangladesh) Sheikh Russel KC
32	(Bangladesh)	Kesto Kumar Bose	CB	16 April 1992 (age 34)	2021	(Bangladesh) Sheikh Jamal DC
40	(Bangladesh)	Tariq Kazi	RWB/LWB/CB /DM/RM	6 October 2000 (age 26)	2019	(Finland) Ilves
44	(Iran)	Khaled Shafiei	CB	29 March 1987 (age 39)	2020	(Iran) Saipa F.C.
71	(Bangladesh)	Rimon Hossain	LB/LM	1 July 2005 (age 21)	2019	(Bangladesh) Friends Social Club
88	(Bangladesh)	Jayanto Lal	CB	6 June 2006 (age 20)	2021	Youth team
Midfielders
7	(Bangladesh)	Masuk Mia Jony	DM/CM	16 January 1998 (age 28)	2018	(Bangladesh) Saif Sporting Club
8	(Brazil)	Fernandes	DM/CM/AM	21 February 1995 (age 31)	2020	(Brazil) Botafogo de Futebol e Regatas
13	(Bangladesh)	Atiqur Rahman Fahad	DM	15 September 1995 (age 31)	2019	(Bangladesh) Abahani Ltd. Dhaka
15	(Bangladesh)	Biplu Ahmed	AM/RW	5 May 1999 (age 27)	2019	(Bangladesh) Sheikh Russel KC
17	(Bangladesh)	Sohel Rana	CM/DM/AM	27 March 1995 (age 31)	2021	(Bangladesh) Abahani Ltd. Dhaka
18	(Bangladesh)	Alamgir Kabir Rana	DM/CM	6 July 1990 (age 36)	2018	(Bangladesh) Sheikh Russel KC
19	(Bangladesh)	Mohammad Ibrahim	LM/LWB/RM/RWB	7 August 1997 (age 29)	2018	(Bangladesh) Saif Sporting Club
23	(Bosnia and Herzegovina)	Stojan Vranješ	AM/CF	11 October 1986 (age 40)	2021	(Bosnia and Herzegovina) FK Borac Banja Luka
31	(Bangladesh)	Tuhidul Islam Riday	DM/CM/AM	25 September 2005 (age 21)	2021	Youth team
33	(Bangladesh)	Shekh Morsalin	DM/CM/AM	25 November 2005 (age 20)	2021	Youth team
58	(Bangladesh)	Mahdi Yousuf Khan	CM/AM/LW/RW	23 December 1995 (age 30)	2020	(England) Sporting Bengal United F.C.
Forwards
6	(Bangladesh)	Mahbubur Rahman Sufil	CF/RW/SS/RWB	10 September 1999 (age 27)	2018	(Bangladesh) Arambagh KS
9	(Bangladesh)	Sumon Reza	CF/SS	15 June 1995 (age 31)	2021	(Bangladesh) Uttar Baridhara Club
10	(Brazil)	Robinho (vice-captain)	LW/RW/AM	21 July 1995 (age 31)	2020	(Brazil) Fluminense FC
11	(Bangladesh)	Tawhidul Alam Sabuz	CF/SS	14 September 1990 (age 36)	2018	(Bangladesh) Saif Sporting Club
20	(Bangladesh)	Eleta Kingsley	CF/LW	29 October 1989 (age 37)	2020	(Bangladesh) Arambagh KS
29	(Bangladesh)	Motin Mia	CF/RW/SS	20 December 1998 (age 27)	2018	(Bangladesh) Saif Sporting Club
67	(Bangladesh)	Piash Ahmed Nova	CF/SS	25 September 2005 (age 21)	2021	(Bangladesh) Wari Club Dhaka
77	(Bangladesh)	Obidur Rahman Nawbab	LW/RW/AM	8 December 1998 (age 27)	2021	(Qatar) Al-Duhail SC
99	(Bangladesh)	Fahim Morshed	RW/LW/CF	1 February 2002 (age 24)	2019	(Bangladesh) Chittagong Abahani Limited

== Pre-season friendly ==
18 November 2021 Friendly	Swadhinata KS	1–2	Bashundhara Kings	Dhaka
13:00				Stadium: BSSS Mostafa Kamal Stadium

22 November 2021	Bashundhara Kings	4–4	Uttar Baridhara SC	Dhaka
13:30				Stadium: Bashundhara Sports Complex

9 January 2022	Bashundhara Kings	5–0	Uttar Baridhara SC	Dhaka
11:30	Ibrahim; 9', 51': Stojan 26'; Robinho 32'; Motin 76'			Stadium: Bashundhara Sports Complex

19 January 2022 Friendly	Bashundhara Kings	0–1	Rahmatganj MFS	Dhaka
15:00			Adjah 29'	Stadium: Bashundhara Sports Complex

== Transfer ==
=== In ===
No.	Pos	Player	Previous club	Fee	Date	Source
17	MF	(Bangladesh) Sohel Rana	(Bangladesh) Abahani Ltd. Dhaka	Free transfer	28 September 2021	
9	FW	(Bangladesh) Sumon Reza	(Bangladesh) Uttar Baridhara SC	Free transfer	19 October 2021	
80	MF	(Brazil) Miguel Figueira	(Brazil) Goiás Esporte Clube	Not disclosed	14 April 2022	
9	FW	(The Gambia) Nuha Marong	(Spain) UE Costa Brava	Not disclosed	21 April 2022	
33	MF	(Bangladesh) Monsur Amin	(Bangladesh) Sheikh Jamal DC	Not disclosed	22 April 2022	

=== Out ===
No.	Pos	Player	Moved to	Fee	Date	Source
1	GK	(Bangladesh) Mitul Hasan	(Bangladesh) Saif Sporting Club	Free transfer		
2	DF	(Bangladesh) Sushanto Tripura	(Bangladesh) Abahani Ltd. Dhaka	Free transfer	September 2021	
3	DF	(Bangladesh) Nurul Naium Faisal	(Bangladesh) Abahani Ltd. Dhaka	Free transfer		
6	MF	(Bangladesh) Emon Mahmud Babu	(Bangladesh) Abahani Ltd. Dhaka	Free transfer		
49	DF	(Bangladesh) Tareq Miah	(Bangladesh) Muktijoddha Sangsad KC	Free transfer		

=== Loans Out ===
No.	Pos	Player	Loaned to	Fee	Date	On loan until	Source
26	DF	(Bangladesh) Mehedi Hasan Mithu	(Bangladesh) Muktijoddha Sangsad KC	Not disclosed	20 April 2022	End of season	
33	MF	(Bangladesh) Sheikh Mursalin	(Bangladesh) Dhaka Mohammedan	Not disclosed	20 April 2022	End of season	
27	MF	(Bangladesh) Obidur Rahman Nawbab	(Bangladesh) Muktijoddha Sangsad KC	Not disclosed	20 April 2022	End of season	

=== Released ===
No.	Position	Player	Date	Source
23	MF	(Bosnia and Herzegovina) Stojan Vranješ	21 April 2022	
8	MF	(Brazil) Fernandes	21 April 2022	

== Competitions ==
Win Draw Loss Fixtures

=== Overall ===
Competition	First match	Last match	Final Position
BPL	3 February 2022	30 July 2022	Champions
Federation Cup	Did not play		None
Independence Cup	30 November 2021	18 December 2021	Runners-up
AFC Cup	18 May 2022	24 May 2022	Group stage

=== Overview ===
Competition	Record							
Competition	Pld	W	D	L	GF	GA	GD	Win %
BPL	22	18	3	1	51	20	+31	81.82
Federation Cup	2	0	0	2	0	6	−6	0.00
Independence Cup	6	5	0	1	16	4	+12	83.33
AFC Cup	3	2	0	1	3	5	−2	66.67
Total	33	25	3	5	70	35	+35	75.76

Source: Competitions

=== Independence Cup ===
==== Group D ====
Pos	Team	Pld	W	D	L	GF	GA	GD	Pts	Status
1	Bashundhara Kings	3	3	0	0	10	0	+10	9	Qualified for Knockout stage
2	Bangladesh Police FC	3	0	2	1	2	3	−1	2	Qualified for Knockout stage
3	Chittagong Abahani	3	0	2	1	2	5	−3	2	
4	Bangladesh Navy	3	0	2	1	2	8	−6	2	

Source: Global Sports Archive
Rules for classification: Group stage tiebreakers

30 November 2021	Bashundhara Kings	6–0	Bangladesh Navy	Dhaka
19:15 BST (UTC+6)	Vranješ 41', 68'; Fernandes 43'; Eleta 79'; Robinho 90+1'; Habibur 90+2' (o.g.)	Report		Stadium: BSSS Mostafa Kamal Stadium; Referee: Md Alamgir Sarkar

4 December 2021	Bangladesh Police FC	0–1	Bashundhara Kings	Dhaka
16:00 BST (UTC+6)		Report	Robinho 16' (pen.)	Stadium: BSSS Mostafa Kamal Stadium; Referee: Anisur Rahman Sagor

8 December 2021	Bashundhara Kings	3–0	Chittagong Abahani	Dhaka
18:00 BST (UTC+6)	Robinho 22'; Ibrahim 83'; Motin 88'	Report		Stadium: BSSS Mostafa Kamal Stadium; Referee: Md Alamgir Sarkar

==== Knockout stage ====
12 December 2021 Quarter-finals	Bashundhara Kings	4–0	Sheikh Jamal DC	Dhaka
20:00 BST (UTC+6)	Motin 58'; Fernandes 73', 81'; SK Rana 90+4'	Report		Stadium: BSSS Mostafa Kamal Stadium; Referee: Saimoon Hasan Sany

14 December 2021 Semi-finals	Bangladesh Police FC	1–2 (a.e.t.)	Bashundhara Kings	Dhaka
20:00 BST (UTC+6)	Quipapá 8'	Report	Ibrahim 30'; Arafat 119'	Stadium: BSSS Mostafa Kamal Stadium; Referee: Md Alamgir Sarkar

18 December 2021 Final	Dhaka Abahani	3–0	Bashundhara Kings	Dhaka
17:30 BST (UTC+6)	Rakib 53'; Dorielton 63' (pen.), 72'	Report		Stadium: BSSS Mostafa Kamal Stadium; Referee: Md Alamgir Sarkar

=== Federation Cup ===
==== Group A ====
Pos	Team	Pld	W	D	L	GF	GA	GD	Pts	Status
1	Dhaka Mohammedan	2	1	1	0	4	1	+3	4 (Note: As the fair play points of the two teams were equal, the group champion and runners-up were determined through a penalty shootout.Dhaka Mohammedan (4–3) Swadhinata KS.)	Advance to Knockout stage
2	Swadhinata KS	2	1	1	0	4	1	+3	4	Advance to Knockout stage
3	Bashundhara Kings	2	0	0	2	0	6	−6	0	Later withdrew

Source: Soccerway
Rules for classification: Group stage tiebreakers
Notes:

25 December 2022	Bashundhara Kings	0–3; Walkover	Swadhinata KS	Dhaka
16:00 BST (UTC+6)		Report		Stadium: BSSS Mostafa Kamal Stadium; Referee: Md Alamgir Sarkar
Note: Swadhinata KS were awarded walkover win by 3 goals since Bashundhara Kings didn't turn up for the match

29 December 2022	Bashundhara Kings	0–3; Walkover	Dhaka Mohammedan	Dhaka
18:45 BST (UTC+6)		Report		Stadium: BSSS Mostafa Kamal Stadium
Note: Dhaka Mohammedan were awarded walkover win by 3 goals since Bashundhara KS didn't turn up for the match

=== Premier League ===
==== League table ====
Pos	Team	Pld	W	D	L	GF	GA	GD	Pts	Qualification or relegation
1	Bashundhara Kings (C, Q)	22	18	3	1	53	21	+32	57	Qualification for 2023 AFC Champions League Play-off round or 2023 AFC Cup Group Stage
2	Dhaka Abahani (Q)	22	14	5	3	55	31	+24	47	Qualification for 2023 AFC Cup Play-off round
3	Saif Sporting Club	22	11	4	7	58	37	+21	37	
4	Sheikh Jamal DC	22	9	8	5	34	31	+3	35	
5	Dhaka Mohammedan	22	8	9	5	39	26	+13	33	

Source: Soccerway
Rules for classification: 1) Points; 2) Goal difference; 3) Goals scored.
(C) Champions; (Q) Qualify for the AFC competition

==== Results summary ====
Overall								Home						Away					
Pld	W	D	L	GF	GA	GD	Pts	W	D	L	GF	GA	GD	W	D	L	GF	GA	GD
22	18	3	1	53	22	+31	57	9	1	1	34	15	+19	9	2	0	19	7	+12

Source: Soccerway

==== Results by round ====
Round	1	2	3	4	5	6	7	8	9	10	11	12	13	14	15	16	17	18	19	20	21	22
Ground	H	A	H	H	H	A	H	H	H	A	H	A	H	A	A	A	H	A	A	A	H	A
Result	L	W	W	W	W	W	W	W	W	D	D	W	W	W	W	W	W	D	W	W	W	W
Position	9	6	4	2	2	1	1	1	1	1	1	1	1	1	1	1	1	1	1	1	1	1

Source: Matches
A = Away; H = Home; W = Win; D = Draw; L = Loss; P = Postponed

=== Matches ===
3 February 2022 1	Bashundhara Kings	1–2	Swadhinata KS	Gazipur
15:00 BST (UTC+6)	S. Rana (yellow card) 33'; A. Fahad (yellow card) 45+3'; T. Sabuz 73'; O. Nawbab (yellow card) 90+7'	Report	N. Turković 25' (pen.) (yellow card) 45+1'; S. Hossain (yellow card) 51'; R. Ahmed 45+1'; S. Jahan (yellow card) 90+3'	Stadium: Shaheed Ahsan Ullah Master Stadium; Referee: Md Alamgir Sarker

7 February 2022 2	Uttar Baridhara Club	0–1	Bashundhara Kings	Munshigonj
15:00 BST (UTC+6)	M. Sayed (yellow card) 52'; S. Fozilov (yellow card) 74'	Report	S. Vranješ 26'; B. Ghosh (yellow card) 39'; A. Fahad (yellow card) 45+3'	Stadium: [[Munshigonj }Stadium|Munshigonj District Stadium]] Referee: Golam Mourshed Chowdhury

12 February 2022 3	Bashundhara Kings	1–0	Muktijoddha Sangsad KC	Gazipur
15:00 BST (UTC+6)	Robinho 58'	Report	Habibur (yellow card) 61'	Stadium: Shaheed Ahsan Ullah Master Stadium; Referee: Bhubon Mohon Tarafder

17 February 2022 4	Bashundhara Kings	3–0	Bangladesh Police FC	Dhaka
15:00 BST (UTC+6)	Shafiei (yellow card) 45+2'; Robinho 66', 77' (pen.); Eleta 87'	Report	Esanur (yellow card) 66' (red card) 82'; Monaem (yellow card) 79'; Al Amin (yellow card) 83'	Stadium: Bashundhara Kings Arena; Referee: Md Anisur Rahman

22 February 2022 5	Bashundhara Kings	3–2	Rahmatganj MFS	Dhaka
15:00 BST (UTC+6)	Robinho 32'; Ibrahim 44'; Yeasin 75'; Sohel (yellow card) 87'	Report	Mehbub (yellow card) 17'; Touré (yellow card) 20'; Sunday 28', 45+3' (pen.)	Stadium: Bashundhara Kings Arena; Referee: Golam Mourshed Chowdhury Nayon

28 February 2022 6	Sheikh Russel KC	0–1	Bashundhara Kings	Dhaka
15:00 BST (UTC+6)	Rahmat (yellow card) 59'; Jewel (yellow card) 61'; Nasiruddin (yellow card) 75'	Report	Sohel (yellow card) 74'; Robinho 83' (pen.)	Stadium: Bashundhara Kings Arena; Referee: Md Alamgir Sarker

5 March 2022 7	Bashundhara Kings	2–0	Dhaka Mohammedan	Dhaka
15:00 BST (UTC+6)	Sumon 11'; Robinho 19' (yellow card) 47'; Bishwanath (yellow card) 47'; Yeasin (yellow card) 88'	Report	Anik (yellow card) 14' (yellow-red card) 47'	Stadium: Bashundhara Kings Arena; Referee: Saimoon Hasan Sany

11 March 2022 8	Bashundhara Kings	5–0	Chittagong Abahani	Dhaka
15:00 BST (UTC+6)	Sumon 17'; Robinho 28', 43'; Ibrahim 32'; Kingsley 67'	Report	Anifowoshe (yellow card) 61'	Stadium: Bashundhara Kings Arena; Referee: Bhubon Mohon Tarafder

16 March 2022 9	Bashundhara Kings	4–3	Saif Sporting Club	Dhaka
15:00 BST (UTC+6)	Robinho 3'; Motin 26', 55'; Khaled 77'; Yeasin (yellow card) 43'; Ibrahim (yellow card) 81'	Report	Mfon 18'; Foysal 59'; Riyadul 67'; Jamal (yellow card) 83'; Rahim (yellow card) 90+4'	Stadium: Bashundhara Kings Arena; Referee: Golam Mourshed Chowdhury Nayon

3 April 2022 10	Dhaka Abahani	2–2	Bashundhara Kings	Sylhet
15:30 BST (UTC+6)	Colindres 20'; Dorielton 84'		Sohel (red card) 27'; Kingsley 64'; Robinho 69' (yellow card) 70'; Tariq (yellow card) 82'	Stadium: Sylhet District Stadium; Referee: Anisur Rahman

7 April 2022 11	Bashundhara Kings	3–3	Sheikh Jamal DC	Dhaka
15:30 BST (UTC+6)	Vranješ (yellow card) 48' (goal) 76'; Ibrahim (yellow card) 53'; Rimon (yellow card) 54'; Robinho (yellow card) 75'; Kingsley 89', 90+1'		Valizonov (yellow card) 50' (goal) 71'; Shakil (yellow card) 75'; Sillah 83'; Kanform 85'	Stadium: Bashundhara Kings Arena; Referee: Golam Mourshed Chowdhury Nayon

24 April 2022 12	Swadhinata KS	0–2	Bashundhara Kings	Rajshahi
15:00 BST (UTC+6)	Shakil (yellow card) 42'	Report	Figueira 28', 35'; Biplu (yellow card) 84'	Stadium: Rajshahi District Stadium; Referee: Bhubon Mohon Torafder

28 April 2022 13	Bashundhara Kings	6–0	Uttar Baridhara Club	Dhaka
15:30 BST (UTC+6)	Figueira 26'; Sohel 30'; Marong 38'; Shafiei (yellow card) 45+4'; Bishwanath (yellow card) 58'; Ibrahim (yellow card) 70'; Sabuz 87'; Khokon 90+2' (o.g.); Sumon 90+3'	Report	Jewel (yellow card) 49'; Saiful (yellow card) 86'	Stadium: Bashundhara Kings Arena; Referee: Golam Mourshed Chowdhury Nayon

7 May 2022 14	Muktijoddha Sangsad KC	2–3	Bashundhara Kings	Munshigonj
15:45 BST (UTC+6)	Abdallah 17', 60'	Report	Marong (yellow card) 22'; Robinho 48'; Rimon (yellow card) 61'; Kingsley 73'; Sumon 80'	Stadium: Munshigonj District Stadium; Referee: Mohammad Jalaluddin

12 May 2022 15	Bangladesh Police FC	1–2	Bashundhara Kings	Rajshahi
15:45 BST (UTC+6)	Monaem (yellow card) 14'; Danilo (yellow card) 40' (goal) 81'		Miguel 12', 30'; Bishwanath (yellow card) 81'	Stadium: Rajshahi District Stadium; Referee: Golam Mourshed Chowdhury Nayon

21 June 2022 16	Rahmatganj MFS	0–2	Bashundhara Kings	Sylhet
15:30 BST (UTC+6)	Ziaur (red card) 33'	Report	Miguel 36'; Robinho 39'; Shafiei (yellow card) 90+3'	Stadium: Sylhet District Stadium; Referee: Md Alamgir Sarker

26 June 2022 17	Bashundhara Kings	3–2	Sheikh Russel KC	Dhaka
16:00 BST (UTC+6)	Miguel 39'; Khaled 65'; Robinho 65'	Report	Didarul (yellow card) 6'; Akmatov 28' (pen.) (yellow card) 76'; Rabby 90+3'; Hemanta (yellow card) 64'	Stadium: Bashundhara Kings Arena; Referee: Md Saymoon Hasan

2 July 2022 18	Dhaka Mohammedan	1–1	Bashundhara Kings	Comilla
16:00 BST (UTC+6)	Morsalin 11'; Ahsan Habib (yellow card) 90+3'	Report	Figueira 34'; Fahad (yellow card) 43'; Ibrahim (yellow card) 73'; Bishwanath (yellow card) 74'; Sumon (yellow card) 90'	Stadium: Comilla District Stadium; Referee: Md Alamgir Sarker

7 July 2022 19	Chittagong Abahani	0–1	Bashundhara Kings	Cumilla
16:00 BST (UTC+6)	Candy (yellow card) 14'; Arafat (yellow card) 90+4'	Report	Shafiei (yellow card) 42'; H. Remon (yellow card) 45+7'; Nuha 52'; Yeasin (yellow card) 57'; Miguel (yellow card) 85'; Mahdi (yellow card) 90+5'	Stadium: Shaheed Dhirendranath Datta Stadium; Referee: Saymoon Hasan Sany

18 July 2022 20	Saif Sporting Club	0–2	Bashundhara Kings	Munshigonj
16:00 BST (UTC+6)	Rahim (yellow card) 45'; Abid (yellow card) 49'; Mfon (yellow card) 65'	Report	Yeasin (yellow card) 9' (yellow-red card) 37'; Motin 28'; Sabuz (yellow card) 37'; Biplu 81'; Rimon (yellow card) 85'	Stadium: Munshigonj District Stadium; Referee: Golam Mourshed Chowdhury Nayan

25 July 2022 21	Bashundhara Kings	3–2	Dhaka Abahani	Dhaka
16:00 BST (UTC+6)	Nuha 20'; Robinho 71', 90+1'	Report	Shahidul (yellow card) 18'; Rakib (yellow card) 19' (goal) 45+1'; Monir (yellow card) 88'; Raphael 90+6'	Stadium: Bashundhara Kings Arena; Referee: Golam Murshed Chowdhury Nayan

30 July 2022 22	Sheikh Jamal DC	1–2	Bashundhara Kings	Dhaka
16:00 BST (UTC+6)	Babu (yellow card) 23'; Sohanur 68'; Otabek (yellow card) 45' (yellow-red card) 82'	Report	Motin 8'; Fahad (yellow card) 21'; Robinho 39'; Bishwanath (red card) 90+7'	Stadium: Bashundhara Kings Arena; Referee: Alamgir Sarker

=== AFC Cup ===
==== Group D ====
Pos	Team	Pld	W	D	L	GF	GA	GD	Pts	Qualification
1	(India) ATK Mohun Bagan (H)	3	2	0	1	11	6	+5	6 (Note: Head-to-head points: ATK Mohun Bagan 3, Bashundhara Kings 0.)	Inter-zone play-off semi-finals
2	(Bangladesh) Bashundhara Kings	3	2	0	1	3	5	−2	6	
3	(Maldives) Maziya	3	1	0	2	3	6	−3	3 (Note: Head-to-head points: Maziya 3, Gokulam Kerala 0.)	
4	(India) Gokulam Kerala	3	1	0	2	5	5	0	3	

Source: AFC
Rules for classification: Tiebreakers
(H) Hosts
Notes:

18 May 2022 2022 AFC Cup group stage	Bashundhara Kings (Bangladesh)	1–0	(Maldives) Maziya S&RC	Kolkata, India
18:00 BST (UTC+6)	Marong 33'	Report		Stadium: Salt Lake Stadium; Attendance: 259; Referee: Yudi Nurcahya (Indonesia)

21 May 2022 2022 AFC Cup group stage	Bashundhara Kings (Bangladesh)	0–4	(India) ATK Mohun Bagan	Kolkata, India
14:00 BST (UTC+6)		Report	Colaco 24', 33', 53'; Williams 77'	Stadium: Salt Lake Stadium; Attendance: 34,595; Referee: Chen Hsin-chuan (Chinese Taipei)

24 May 2022 2022 AFC Cup group stage	Bashundhara Kings (Bangladesh)	2–1	(India) Gokulam Kerala	Kolkata, India
14:00 BST (UTC+6)	Robinho 36'; Marong 54'	Report	Fletcher 75'	Stadium: Salt Lake Stadium; Attendance: 497; Referee: Masoud Tufaylieh (Syria)

== Statistics ==
=== Goalscorers ===
As of match played till 30 July 2022

Rank	Player	Position	Total	BPL	Independence Cup	Federation Cup	AFC Cup
1	(Brazil) Robinho	FW	20	16	3	0	1
2	(Brazil) Miguel Figueira	MF	8	8	0	0	0
3	(Bangladesh) Eleta Kingsley	FW	7	6	1	0	0
4	(Bangladesh) Motin Mia	FW	6	4	2	0	0
5	(Bangladesh) Mohammad Ibrahim	MF	5	3	2	0	0
6	(Bangladesh) Sumon Reza	FW	4	4	0	0	0
6	(The Gambia) Nuha Marong	FW	4	3	0	0	1
6	(Bosnia and Herzegovina) Stojan Vranješ	MF	4	2	2	0	0
7	(Brazil) Fernandes	MF	3	0	3	0	0
7	(Iran) Khaled Shafiei	DF	3	3	0	0	0
8	(Bangladesh) Yeasin Arafat	DF	2	1	1	0	0
8	(Bangladesh) Tawhidul Alam Sabuz	FW	2	2	0	0	0
9	(Bangladesh) Alamgir Kabir Rana	MF	1	0	1	0	0
9	(Bangladesh) Biplu Ahmed	DF	1	1	0	0	0
Own goal			1	1	0	0	0
Total			72	53	15	0	3

Source: Matches
