= 2018 Federation Cup (Bangladesh) =

30th season of the Bangladesh Federation Cup

Walton Federation Cup 2018

Tournament details
- Host country: Bangladesh
- Dates: 27 October – 23 November 2018
- Teams: 13

Final positions
- Champions: Dhaka Abahani (11th title)
- Runners-up: Bashundhara Kings

Tournament statistics
- Matches played: 22
- Goals scored: 74 (3.36 per match)
- Attendance: 209,069 (9,503 per match)
- Top scorer(s): 6 Goals (Nigeria) Sunday Chizoba (Dhaka Abahani)
- Best player(s): (Nigeria) Sunday Chizoba (Dhaka Abahani)

The 2018 Federation Cup, also known as the Walton Federation Cup 2018 due to the sponsorship from Walton Group, was the 30th edition of the tournament. Thirteen teams competed for this cup. Consecutively winning the previous two editions of the tournament, Abahani completed their second hattrick and 11th Federation Cup title by defeating Bashundhara Kings in the finals by 3–1. This earned them a slot in the group stage of the 2019 AFC Cup.

== Venue ==
Dhaka
Bangabandhu National Stadium
Capacity: 36,000
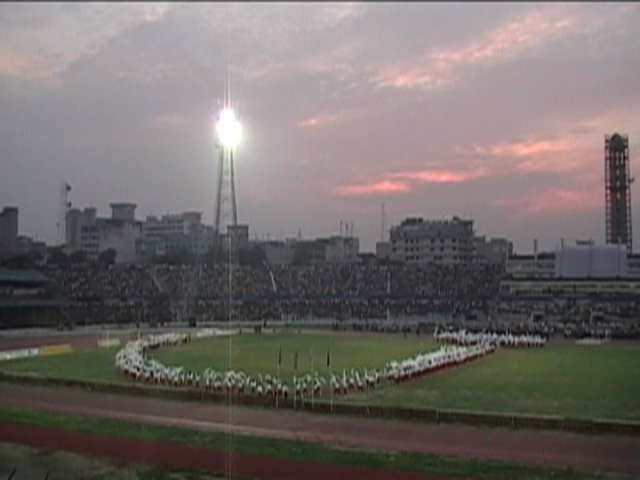

== Draw ==
The draw was held on 20 October 2018 at Bangladesh Football Federation house in Motijheel. The thirteen teams were divided into four groups and the top two teams from each group advanced to the quarter-finals.

- All 22 matches were played at Bangabandhu National Stadium, Dhaka
- Two matches of the group stage were played daily.
- All 22 matches were broadcast live on Channel 9

== Prize money ==
- Champion got US$5960.
- Runner-Up got US$3576.

== Group stages ==
- All matches were played at Dhaka
- Time listed are UTC+6:00.

Key to colours in group tables
Group Winners and Runners-up advance to the Quarter-Finals

=== Group A ===
Pos	Team	Pld	W	D	L	GF	GA	GD	Pts	Qualification
1	Arambagh KS	2	2	0	0	5	3	+2	6	Quarterfinals
2	Chittagong Abahani	2	1	0	1	5	3	+2	3	Quarterfinals
3	Rahmatganj MFS	2	0	0	2	2	6	−4	0	

Source: azscore

27 October 2018
17:00 BST

Chittagong Abahani	3–1	Rahmatganj MFS
35' Mamadou Bah; 72' Magalan Awala; 76' Mufta Lawal	Report	57' Rakib Hossain

Bangabandhu National Stadium, Dhaka
Attendance: 9140
Referee: A. Rahman Dhali (Bangladesh)

30 October 2018
17:00 BST

Rahmatganj MFS	1–3	Arambagh KS
90+3' Siyo Zunapio	Report	45+', 66' Matthew Chinedu; 80' Arifur Rahman

Bangabandhu National Stadium, Dhaka
Attendance: 1942
Referee: I. Alam (Bangladesh)

4 November 2018
17:00 BST

Arambagh KS	2–2	Chittagong Abahani
45+2' (pen.) Ikbol Babakhanov; 85' Shahriar Bappi	Report	8' Magalan Awala; 29' Mamadou Bah
Penalties
I. Babakhanov (penalty scored); Rajon (penalty scored); Robiul (penalty scored); J. Sujon (penalty missed); K. Chukwudi (penalty scored)	4–2	(penalty missed) M. Lawal; (penalty missed) N. Rasel; (penalty scored) D. Tagoe; (penalty scored) K. Bose

Bangabandhu National Stadium, Dhaka
Attendance: 4610
Referee: M. Daly (Bangladesh)

=== Group B ===
Pos	Team	Pld	W	D	L	GF	GA	GD	Pts	Qualification
1	Saif Sporting Club	2	2	0	0	8	1	+7	6	Quarterfinals
2	Team BJMC	2	1	0	1	4	5	−1	3	Quarterfinals
3	Brothers Union	2	0	0	2	2	8	−6	0	

Updated to match(es) played on 5 November 2018. Source: NowGoal

28 October 2018
17:15 BST

Saif Sporting Club	3–1	Team BJMC
Park Seung-il 5' (pen.); Jafar Iqbal 66'; Denis Bolshakov 89' (pen.)	Report	Abdullah Al Parvez 12'

Bangabandhu National Stadium, Dhaka
Attendance: 1740
Referee: Md. Sagar (Bangladesh)

31 October 2018
17:15 BST

Team BJMC	3–2	Brothers Union
Otabek Valijonov 45+', 54', 58'	Report	Leonardo Vieira Lima 26'; Everton Souza Santos 51'

Bangabandhu National Stadium, Dhaka
Attendance: 1841
Referee: O. Gani (Bangladesh)

5 November 2018
15:15 BST

Brothers Union	0–5	Saif Sporting Club
		Denis Bolshakov 40', 90+5'; Rahmat Mia 13'; Jabed Khan 30'; Sazzad Hossain 84'

Bangabandhu National Stadium, Dhaka
Attendance: 7400
Referee: G. Chaudhury Nayan (Bangladesh)

=== Group C ===
Pos	Team	Pld	W	D	L	GF	GA	GD	Pts	Qualification
1	Sheikh Russel KC	2	2	0	0	3	0	+3	6	Quarterfinals
2	Dhaka Abahani	2	1	0	1	1	1	0	3	Quarterfinals
3	Muktijoddha Sangsad KC	2	0	0	2	0	3	−3	0	

Updated to match(es) played on 5 November 2018. Source: Dhaka Tribune

28 October 2018
15:15 BST

Dhaka Abahani	1–0	Muktijoddha Sangsad KC
Mamunul Islam 64'

Bangabandhu National Stadium, Dhaka
Attendance: 4810
Referee: S. Alam (Bangladesh)

31 October 2018
15:15 BST

Muktijoddha Sangsad KC	0–2	Sheikh Russel KC
		Raphael Odovin 70'; Alex Rafael 90+2'

Bangabandhu National Stadium, Dhaka
Attendance: 10418
Referee: M. Dhali (Bangladesh)

5 November 2018
17:15 BST

Sheikh Russel KC	1–0	Dhaka Abahani
Alisher Azizov 30'

Bangabandhu National Stadium, Dhaka
Attendance: 16413
Referee: B. Gour (Bangladesh)

=== Group D ===
Pos	Team	Pld	W	D	L	GF	GA	GD	Pts	Qualification
1	Bashundhara Kings	3	1	2	0	7	4	+3	5	Quarterfinals
2	Sheikh Jamal Dhanmondi Club	3	1	2	0	4	3	+1	5	Quarterfinals
3	Dhaka Mohammedan	3	1	1	1	5	6	−1	4	
4	NoFeL Sporting Club	3	0	1	2	2	5	−3	1	

Updated to match(es) played on 6 November 2018. Source: FlashScoremobi

29 October 2018
15:15 BST

Dhaka Mohammedan	2–5	Bashundhara Kings
Landing Darboe 16', 68' (pen.)	Report	Marcos Vinícius 90+3', 90+4'; Daniel Colindres 22' (pen.); Jorge Gotor 71'; Motin Mia 78'

Bangabandhu National Stadium, Dhaka
Attendance: 9003
Referee: M. Nuruzzaman (Bangladesh)

29 October 2018
17:15 BST

Sheikh Jamal Dhanmondi Club	2–1	NoFeL Sporting Club
Solomon King 45+2'; Shakhawat Hossain Rony 60'	Report	Ismael Bangoura 45+4'

Bangabandhu National Stadium, Dhaka
Attendance: 12490
Referee: S. Imon (Bangladesh)

3 November 2018
15:15 BST

NoFeL Sporting Club	0–2	Dhaka Mohammedan
		Nkwocha Kingsley 69', 70'

Bangabandhu National Stadium, Dhaka
Attendance: 17340
Referee: A. Rahman (Bangladesh)

3 November 2018
17:15 BST

Sheikh Jamal Dhanmondi Club	1–1	Bashundhara Kings
Solomon King 12'		Marcos Vinícius 8'

Bangabandhu National Stadium, Dhaka
Attendance: 12170
Referee: M. Hossain (Bangladesh)

6 November 2018
15:15 BST

Bashundhara Kings	1–1	NoFeL Sporting Club
Masuk Mia Jony 37'		Ashraful Islam 61'

Bangabandhu National Stadium, Dhaka
Attendance: 5618
Referee: R. Rashid (Bangladesh)

6 November 2018
17:15 BST

Sheikh Jamal Dhanmondi Club	1–1	Dhaka Mohammedan
Luciano Araya 48'		Landing Darboe 33'

Bangabandhu National Stadium, Dhaka
Attendance: 19237
Referee: Sharifuzzaman (Bangladesh)

== Knockout stage ==
- Time listed are UTC+6:00
- All matches were held at Dhaka
- In the knockout stage, extra time and penalty shoot-out are used to decide the winner if necessary.

=== Bracket ===
Quarterfinals
8 November
Arambagh	2
Dhaka	3
9 November
Saif	1
Sheikh Jamal	2
10 November
Sheikh Russel	1
Chittagong	0
11 November
Bashundhara	5
Team BJMC	1

Semifinals
19 November
Dhaka	4
Sheikh Jamal	2
20 November
Sheikh Russel	0
Bashundhara	1

Final
23 November
Dhaka	3
Bashundhara	1

=== Quarterfinals ===
8 November 2018
17:00 BST

Arambagh KS	2–3	Dhaka Abahani
Shahriar Bappi 7'; Ikbol Babakhanov 33' (pen.)	Report	Sunday Chizoba 30'; Sohel Rana 44'; Kervens Belfort 90+5'

Bangabandhu National Stadium, Dhaka
Attendance: 3714
Referee: Bharat Chandra Gour (Bangladesh)

9 November 2018
17:00 BST

Saif Sporting Club	1–2	Sheikh Jamal Dhanmondi Club
Deiner Córdoba 71'	Report	Sainey Bojang 30', 76'

Bangabandhu National Stadium, Dhaka
Attendance: 1019
Referee: Ferdous Ahamed (Bangladesh)

10 November 2018
17:00 BST

Sheikh Russel KC	1–0	Chittagong Abahani
Raphael Odovin 47'	Report

Bangabandhu National Stadium, Dhaka
Attendance: 6158
Referee: Sujit Chandan Banarjee (Bangladesh)

11 November 2018
17:00 BST

Bashundhara Kings	5–1	Team BJMC
Daniel Colindres 2', 9', 15'; Tawhidul Alam Sabuz 70'; Motin Mia 79'	Report	Samson Iliasu 87' (pen.)

Bangabandhu National Stadium, Dhaka
Attendance: 15710
Referee: Mohammad Alamgir (Bangladesh)

=== Semifinals ===
19 November 2018
17:00 BST

Dhaka Abahani	4–2	Sheikh Jamal Dhanmondi Club
Masih Saighani 56'; Sunday Chizoba 65' (pen.), 82', 86'	Report	Didarul Alam 79', 84'

Bangabandhu National Stadium, Dhaka
Attendance: 11,420
Referee: M. Nahid (Bangladesh)

20 November 2018
17:00 BST

Sheikh Russel KC	0–1 (a.e.t.)	Bashundhara Kings
	Report	Tawhidul Alam Sabuz 118'

Bangabandhu National Stadium, Dhaka
Attendance: 17,411
Referee: B. Talukdar (Bangladesh)

=== Final ===
23 November 2018
16:30 BST

Dhaka Abahani	3-1	Bashundhara Kings
Chizoba 50', 79'; Belfort 82'	Report	Colindres 21'

Bangabandhu National Stadium, Dhaka
Attendance: 19,465
Referee: Mizanur Rahman (Bangladesh)

== Goal scorers ==
As of 23 November 2018

Rank	Player	Club	Goals
1	(Nigeria) Sunday Chizoba	Dhaka Abahani	6
2	(Costa Rica) Daniel Colindres	Bashundhara Kings	5
3	(Brazil) Marcos Vinícius	Bashundhara Kings	3
3	(The Gambia) Landing Darboe	Dhaka Mohammedan	3
3	(Russia) Denis Bolshakov	Saif Sporting Club	3
3	(Uzbekistan) Otabek Valijonov	Team BJMC	3
7	(Bangladesh) Didarul Alam	Sheikh Jamal Dhanmondi Club	2
7	(The Gambia) Sainey Bojang	Sheikh Jamal Dhanmondi Club	2
7	(The Gambia) Solomon King	Sheikh Jamal Dhanmondi Club	2
7	(Bangladesh) Motin Mia	Bashundhara Kings	2
7	(Bangladesh) Tawhidul Alam Sabuz	Bashundhara Kings	2
7	(Bangladesh) Shahriar Bappi	Arambagh KS	2
7	(Nigeria) Raphael Odovin	Arambagh KS	2
7	(Uzbekistan) Ikbol Babakhanov	Arambagh KS	2
7	(The Gambia) Momodou Bah	Chittagong Abahani	2
7	(Nigeria) Magalan Awala	Chittagong Abahani	2
7	(Haiti) Kervens Belfort	Dhaka Abahani	2
7	(Nigeria) Kinsley Chigozie	Dhaka Mohammedan	2
7	(Nigeria) Raphael Odovin	Sheikh Russel KC	2
