= 2018 Independence Cup (Bangladesh) =

2018–19 Independence Cup
Tournament details
- Country: Bangladesh
- Dates: 1–26 December 2018
- Teams: 13

Final positions
- Champions: Bashundhara Kings (1st title)
- Runners-up: Sheikh Russel KC

Tournament statistics
- Matches played: 22
- Goals scored: 44 (2 per match)
- Attendance: 118,765 (5,398 per match)
- Top goal scorer(s): 4 goals (Cameroon) Paul Emile Biyaga (Arambagh KS)

Awards
- Best player: (Bangladesh) Anisur Rahman Zico (Bashundhara Kings)

The 2018 Independence Cup, also known as Walton Independence Cup 2018 or Walton Independence Cup Football Tournament 2018 due to the sponsorship from Walton Group, was the 11th edition of the Independence Cup, the main domestic annual club football tournament organized by Bangladesh Football Federation. Thirteen participants competed in the tournament.

Arambagh KS was the winner of the previous edition, having defeated 2–0 Chittagong Abahani in the final of the tournament.

== Venue ==
Dhaka
Bangabandhu National Stadium
Capacity: 36,000
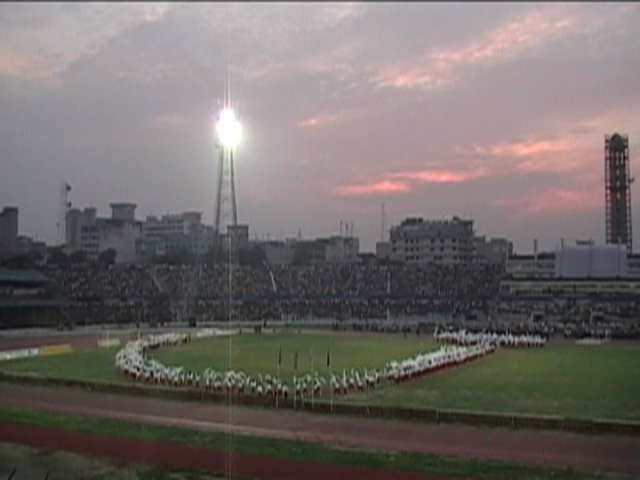

- All 22 matches were played at Bangabandhu National Stadium, Dhaka
- 1, 4 and 7 December were played 1 match in a day of group stage.
- 2, 3, 5, 6, 8 & 9 December were played 2 matches in a day of group stage.
- All matches were live telecast on Channel 9
- Co-sponsored by Progoti Life Insurance Company Limited, Marcel Fridge & www.risingbd.com

== Prize money ==
- Champion got US$5960.
- Runners-up got US$3576.

== Draw ==
The draw of the tournament was held 18:00 BST at BFF house Motijheel on 25 November 2018. The thirteen participants were divided into four groups. The top two teams from each group played Quarterfinals.

== Group stage ==
- All matches were played in Dhaka.
- Times listed are UTC+06:00.

Key to colours in group tables
Group Winners and Runners-up advance to the Quarterfinals

=== Group A ===
Pos	Team	Pld	W	D	L	GF	GA	GD	Pts	Qualification
1	Arambagh KS	2	2	0	0	5	2	+3	6	Advance to Quarterfinals
2	Saif Sporting Club	2	1	0	1	2	3	−1	3	Advance to Quarterfinals
3	Team BJMC	2	0	0	2	1	3	−2	0	

Source: GSA

1 December 2018
17:00 BST

Saif Sporting Club	1–0	Team BJMC
Jamal Bhuyan 86'

Bangabandhu National Stadium, Dhaka
Attendance: 5418
Referee: S. Borua (Bangladesh)

4 December 2018
17:00 BST

Team BJMC	1–2	Arambagh KS
Samson Iliasu 37'		Rabiul Hasan 4'; Arifur Rahman 45+2'

Bangabandhu National Stadium, Dhaka
Attendance: 6765
Referee: Imdadul Khan (Bangladesh)

7 December 2018
17:00 BST

Arambagh KS	3–1	Saif Sporting Club
Paul Emile Biyaga 45', 62', 80'		Jamal Bhuyan 68'

Bangabandhu National Stadium, Dhaka
Attendance: 4233
Referee: Mizanur Rahman (Bangladesh)

=== Group B ===
Pos	Team	Pld	W	D	L	GF	GA	GD	Pts	Qualification
1	Chittagong Abahani	3	2	1	0	4	0	+4	7	Advance to Quarterfinals
2	Rahmatganj MFS	3	1	1	1	3	1	+2	4	Advance to Quarterfinals
3	NoFeL Sporting Club	3	1	0	2	2	6	−4	3	
4	Dhaka Mohammedan	3	0	2	1	0	2	−2	2	

Source: GSA

3 December 2018
15:00 BST

Chittagong Abahani	3–0	NoFeL Sporting Club
Mamadou Bah 19', 61'; Mufta Lawal 54'	Report

Bangabandhu National Stadium, Dhaka
Attendance: 7188
Referee: Jahidul Chowdhury (Bangladesh)

3 December 2018
17:15 BST

Dhaka Mohammedan	0–0	Rahmatganj MFS

Bangabandhu National Stadium, Dhaka
Attendance: 12479
Referee: Sazzad Islam Rana (Bangladesh)

6 December 2018
15:00 BST

Rahmatganj MFS	0–1	Chittagong Abahani
	Report	Mamadou Bah 38'

Bangabandhu National Stadium, Dhaka
Attendance: 1866
Referee: Farukh Islam Rana (Bangladesh)

6 December 2018
17:15 BST

NoFeL Sporting Club	2–0	Dhaka Mohammedan
Khandokar Ashraful Islam 28'; Mohammad Roman 90+8'

Bangabandhu National Stadium, Dhaka
Attendance: 1761
Referee: Nahid Islam (Bangladesh)

9 December 2018
15:00 BST

Rahmatganj MFS	3–0	NoFeL Sporting Club
Rakibul Islam 36'; Siyo Zunapio 63', 81'

Bangabandhu National Stadium, Dhaka
Attendance: 1698
Referee: Ismail Hawladar (Bangladesh)

9 December 2018
17:15 BST

Dhaka Mohammedan	0–0	Chittagong Abahani
	Report

Bangabandhu National Stadium, Dhaka
Attendance: 689
Referee: Ashok Chakrabarty (Bangladesh)

=== Group C ===
Pos	Team	Pld	W	D	L	GF	GA	GD	Pts	Qualification
1	Dhaka Abahani	2	1	1	0	2	1	+1	4	Advance to Quarterfinals
2	Brothers Union	2	0	2	0	1	1	0	2	Advance to Quarterfinals
3	Muktijoddha SKC	2	0	1	1	2	3	−1	1	

Source: GSA

2 December 2018
15:00 BST

Dhaka Abahani	2–1	Muktijoddha Sangsad KC
Faisal Ahmed Shitol 76', 78'		Yusuke Kato 90+2' (pen.)

Bangabandhu National Stadium, Dhaka
Attendance: 11418
Referee: Jalal Uddin (Bangladesh)

5 December 2018
15:00 BST

Muktijoddha Sangsad KC	1–1	Brothers Union
Sujon Biswas 23'		Leonardo Vieira Lima 8'

Bangabandhu National Stadium, Dhaka
Attendance: 1576
Referee: Arif Islam (Bangladesh)

8 December 2018
17:15 BST

Brothers Union	0–0	Dhaka Abahani

Bangabandhu National Stadium, Dhaka
Attendance: 3611
Referee: Asaad Islam (Bangladesh)

=== Group D ===
Pos	Team	Pld	W	D	L	GF	GA	GD	Pts	Qualification
1	Bashundhara Kings	2	1	1	0	2	0	+2	4	Advance to Quarterfinals
2	Sheikh Russel KC	2	0	2	0	0	0	0	2	Advance to Quarterfinals
3	Sheikh Jamal DC	2	0	1	1	0	2	−2	1	

Source: GSA

2 December 2018
17:15 BST

Sheikh Jamal Dhanmondi Club	0–2	Bashundhara Kings
		Nasiruddin Chowdhury 18'; Bakhtiyar Duyshobekov 38'

Bangabandhu National Stadium, Dhaka
Attendance: 9498
Referee: G.M. Chowdhury Noyon (Bangladesh)

5 December 2018
17:15 BST

Bashundhara Kings	0–0	Sheikh Russel KC

Bangabandhu National Stadium, Dhaka
Attendance: 5488
Referee: Nizam Sarkar (Bangladesh)

8 December 2018
15:00 BST

Sheikh Russel KC	0–0	Sheikh Jamal Dhanmondi Club

Bangabandhu National Stadium, Dhaka
Attendance: 4948
Referee: Manik Chakladar (Bangladesh)

== Knockout stage ==
- All matches are held at Dhaka
- Time listed UTC+6:00

=== Bracket ===
Quarter-finals
Arambagh KS	3 (3)
Brothers Union	3 (4)
Chittagong Abahani	0
Sheikh Russel KC	2
Dhaka Abahani	1
Saif	0
Bashundhara Kings	2 (3)
Rahmatganj MFS	2 (2)

Semi-finals
Brothers Union	0
Sheikh Russel KC	2
Dhaka Abahani	1 (6)
Bashundhara Kings	1 (7)

Final
Sheikh Russel KC	1
Bashundhara Kings	2

=== Quarterfinals ===
11 December 2018
16:30 BST

Arambagh KS	3–3 (a.e.t.)	Brothers Union
Rabiul Hasan 12', 53'; Paul Emile Biyaga 85'		Leonardo Lima 43'; Mannaf Rabby 65'; Jack Daniels 78'
Penalties
Mohammad Rockey (penalty missed); Rajon Mia (penalty scored); Rabiul Hasan (penalty missed); Abu Sufian Zahid (penalty scored); Kingsley Nkurumeh (penalty scored); Chinedu Matthew (penalty missed)	3–4	Leonardo Lima (penalty missed); Mannaf Rabby (penalty scored); Everton Souza Santos (penalty scored); Muayad Khalid (penalty scored); Joseph Nur Rahman (penalty missed); Khan Mohammad Tara (penalty scored)

Bangabandhu National Stadium, Dhaka
Attendance: 6480
Referee: Jakir Khan (Bangladesh)

12 December 2018
16:30 BST

Chittagong Abahani	0–2	Sheikh Russel KC
	Report	Alisher Azizov 35'; Raphael Odovin 38'

Bangabandhu National Stadium, Dhaka
Attendance: 2346
Referee: Narul Islam (Bangladesh)

13 December 2018
16:30 BST

Dhaka Abahani	1–0	Saif Sporting Club
Kervens Belfort 81'

Bangabandhu National Stadium, Dhaka
Attendance: 6499
Referee: Ashikur Talukdar (Bangladesh)

14 December 2018
16:30 BST

Bashundhara Kings	2–2 (a.e.t.)	Rahmatganj MFS
Daniel Colindres 66'; Bakhtiyar Duyshobekov 90+5'		Jamal Hossain 25'; Faysal Ahmed 71'
Penalties
Bakhtiyar Duyshobekov (penalty scored); Emon Mahmud Babu (penalty missed); Masuk Mia Jony (penalty missed); Nasiruddin Chowdhury (penalty scored); Daniel Colindres (penalty scored)	3–2	Siyo Zunapio (penalty missed); Damian Chigozie Udeh (penalty missed); Faysal Ahmed (penalty scored); Didarul Islam (penalty scored); Monday Osagie (penalty missed)

Bangabandhu National Stadium, Dhaka
Attendance: 3591
Referee: Jahangir Alam (Bangladesh)

=== Semifinals ===
19 December 2018
16:30 BST

Brothers Union	0–2	Sheikh Russel KC
		Alisher Azizov 45', 51'

Bangabandhu National Stadium, Dhaka
Attendance: 4964
Referee: Maruf Islam (Bangladesh)

20 December 2018
16:30 BST

Dhaka Abahani	1–1 (a.e.t.)	Bashundhara Kings
Kervens Belfort 82'		Motin Mia 69'
Penalties
Masih Saighani (penalty scored); Kervens Belfort (penalty missed); Waly Faisal (penalty scored); Rubel Mia (penalty scored); Sunday Chizoba (penalty scored); Raihan Hasan (penalty scored); Tutul Hossain Badsha (penalty scored); Imtiaz Sultan Jitu (penalty missed)	6–7	Bakhtiyar Duyshobekov (penalty scored); Marcos Vinícius (penalty scored); Hemanta Vincent Biswas (penalty scored); Nasiruddin Chowdhury (penalty scored); Daniel Colindres (penalty missed); Rokonuzzaman Kanchan (penalty scored); Masuk Mia Jony (penalty scored); Anisur Rahman Zico (penalty scored)

Bangabandhu National Stadium, Dhaka
Attendance: 3761
Referee: Sazzad Islam Kiron (Bangladesh)

=== Final ===
26 December 2018
16:30 BST

Sheikh Russel KC	1–2 (a.e.t.)	Bashundhara Kings
Raphael Odovin 45+1'	Report	Marcos Vinícius 16'; Motin Mia 95'

Bangabandhu National Stadium, Dhaka
Attendance: 12488
Referee: Sujit Banarjee (Bangladesh)

== Goalscorers ==
As of 27 December 2018

4 Goals

- (Cameroon) Paul Emile Biyaga (Arambagh KS)

3 Goals

- (Uzbekistan) Alisher Azizov (Sheikh Russel KC)
- (Bangladesh) Rabiul Hasan (Arambagh KS)
- (The Gambia) Mamadou Bah (Chittagong Abahani)

2 Goals

- (Bangladesh) Faisal Ahmed Shitol (Dhaka Abahani)
- (Bangladesh) Jamal Bhuyan (Saif Sporting Club)
- (Bangladesh) Motin Mia (Bashundhara Kings)
- (Brazil) Leonardo Vieira Lima (Brothers Union)
- (Democratic Republic of the Congo) Siyo Zunapio (Rahmatganj MFS)
- (Haiti) Kervens Belfort (Dhaka Abahani)
- (Kyrgyzstan) Bakhtiyar Duyshobekov (Bashundhara Kings)
- (Nigeria) Raphael Odovin (Sheikh Russel KC)

1 Goal

- (Bangladesh) Arifur Rahman (Arambagh KS)
- (Bangladesh) Faysal Ahmed (Rahmatganj MFS)
- (Bangladesh) Jamal Hossain (Rahmatganj MFS)
- (Bangladesh) Khandokar Ashraful Islam (NoFeL Sporting Club)
- (Bangladesh) Mannaf Rabby (Brothers Union)
- (Bangladesh) Mohammad Roman (NoFeL Sporting Club)
- (Bangladesh) Nasiruddin Chowdhury (Bashundhara Kings)
- (Bangladesh) Rakibul Islam (Rahmatganj MFS)
- (Bangladesh) Sujon Biswas (Muktijoddha Sangsad KC)
- (Brazil) Marcos Vinícius (Bashundhara Kings)
- (Costa Rica) Daniel Colindres (Bashundhara Kings)
- (Japan) Yusuke Kato (Muktijoddha Sangsad KC)
- (Nigeria) Mufta Lawal (Chittagong Abahani)
- (Nigeria) Samson Iliasu (Team BJMC)
- (Panama) Jack Daniels (Brothers Union)

== See also ==
- 2018–19 Bangladesh Premier League
- 2018 Federation Cup
