= Alamgir Kabir Rana =

Bangladeshi footballer

Personal information
- Full name: Sheikh Alamgir Kabir Rana
- Date of birth: 7 June 1990 (age 36)
- Place of birth: Satkhira Sadar, Bangladesh
- Height: 1.70 m (5 ft 7 in)
- Position: Midfielder

Team information
- Current team: Mohammedan SC
- Number: 15

Senior career*
Years	Team	Apps	(Gls)
2009–2010	Mohammedan SC		
2010–2012	Muktijoddha Sangsad		
2012–2013	Sheikh Jamal DC		
2017–2018	Sheikh Russel KC	19	(0)
2019–2022	Bashundhara Kings	36	(2)
2022–	Mohammedan SC	3	(0)

International career^{‡}
2011–2013	Bangladesh	3	(0)
- * Club domestic league appearances and goals as of 19 May 2023 ‡ National team caps and goals as of 14:00 UTC 4 March 2013

Sheikh Alamgir Kabir Rana (Bengali: শেখ আলমগীর কবির রানা; born 7 June 1990) is a Bangladeshi professional footballer who plays as a midfielder for Bangladesh Premier League club Mohammedan SC. He has also played for the Bangladesh national team.

== Honours ==
Mohammedan SC

- Federation Cup : 2009, 2022–23
- Super Cup : 2009

Bashundhara Kings

- Bangladesh Premier League : 2018–19, 2020–21, 2021–22
- Federation Cup : 2019–20, 2020–21
- Independence Cup : 2018–19
