= 2019–20 Federation Cup (Bangladesh) =

31st season of the Bangladesh Federation Cup

Tournament details
- Host country: Bangladesh
- Dates: 18 December 2019 – 5 January 2020
- Teams: 13

Final positions
- Champions: Bashundhara Kings (1st title)
- Runners-up: Rahmatganj MFS

Tournament statistics
- Matches played: 22
- Goals scored: 51 (2.32 per match)
- Top scorer(s): 4 goals (Puerto Rico) Sidney Rivera (Bangladesh Police FC)
- Best player: (Costa Rica) Daniel Colindres (Bashundhara Kings)

The 2019–20 Federation Cup, also known as TVS Federation Cup 2019 (due to sponsorship reason from TVS Motor Company), was 31st edition of the tournament, the main domestic annual club football competition in Bangladesh organized by Bangladesh Football Federation. The 13 participants will compete for the tournament. The winner of the tournament will earn the slot of playing preliminary round of 2021 AFC Cup.

Dhaka Abahani are current champions. The club have defeated Bashundhara Kings by 3–1 on 23 November 2018.

== Venue ==
Dhaka
Bangabandhu National Stadium
Capacity: 36,000
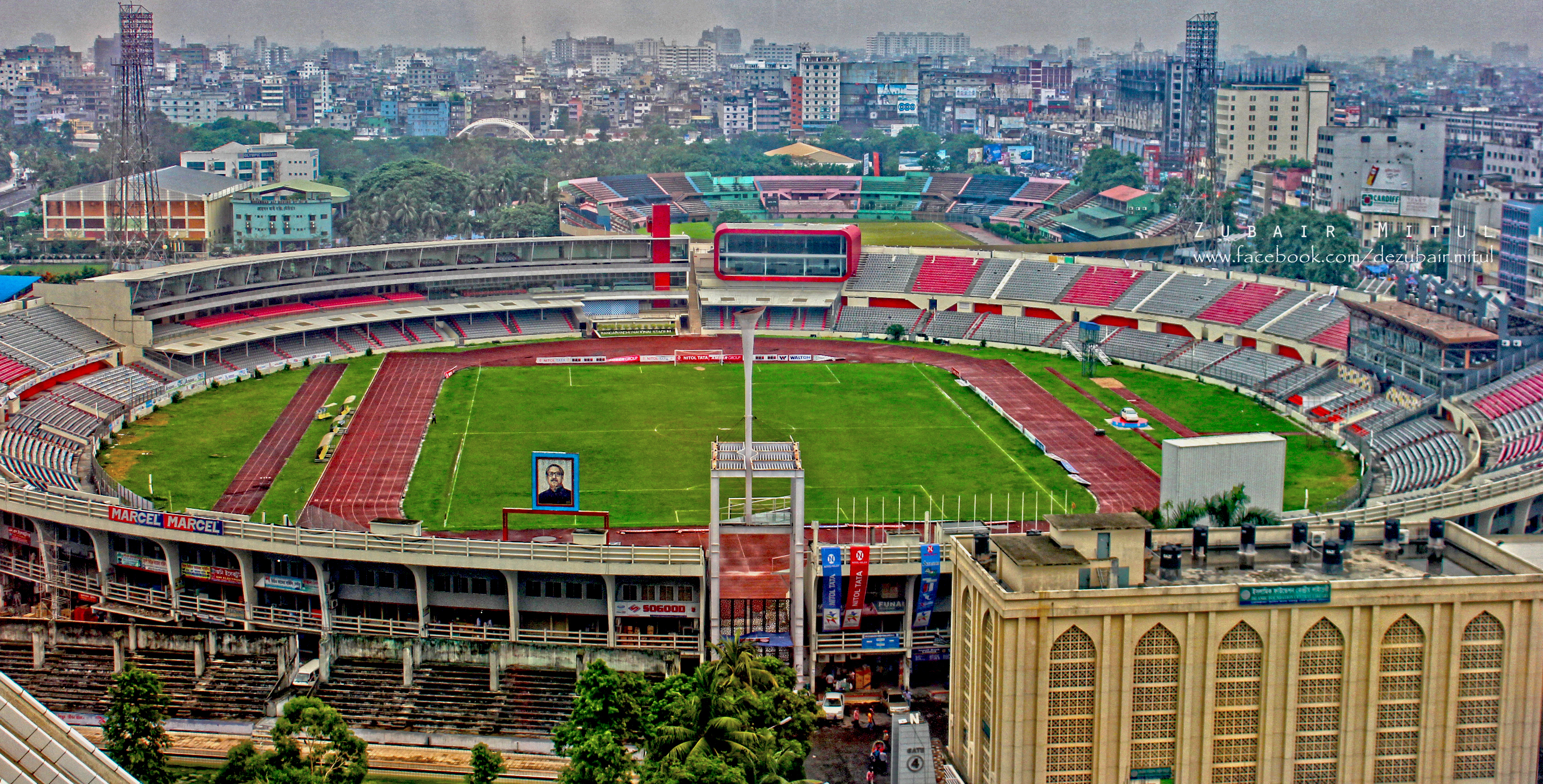

== Participating teams ==
- Arambagh KS
- Bangladesh Police FC
- Bashundhara Kings
- Brothers Union
- Chittagong Abahani
- Dhaka Abahani
- Dhaka Mohammedan
- Muktijoddha Sangsad KC
- Rahmatganj MFS
- Saif Sporting Club
- Sheikh Jamal Dhanmondi Club
- Sheikh Russel KC
- Uttar Baridhara SC

=== Prize money ===
- Champion got US$6,000
- Runner-up got US$3,600

== Draw ==
The draw ceremony of the tournament was held on 13 December 2019 at 15:30 BST on the 3rd floor of BFF House Motijheel, Dhaka. The thirteen teams were divided into four groups. The top two teams from each group will move into the Quarter-Finals.

== Match officials ==
- (Bangladesh) Mizanur Rahman
- (Bangladesh) Shah Alam
- (Bangladesh) Saymoon Hasan Sany
- (Bangladesh) Ferdous Ahamed
- (Bangladesh) Mahmud Hasan Mamun
- (Bangladesh) Mohammad Zamil Farooq Nahid
- (Bangladesh) GM Chowdhury Nayan
- (Bangladesh) Mohammad Jalaluddin
- (Bangladesh) Jashim Akhter
- (Bangladesh) Bhovon Mohon Talukdar

== Group stage ==
- All matches will be held at Dhaka
- Time listed are UTC+6:00

Key to colour in group tables
Group Winners and Runners-up advance to the Quarter-Finals

=== Group A ===
Pos	Team	Pld	W	D	L	GF	GA	GD	Pts	Qualification
1	Dhaka Abahani	2	2	0	0	9	1	+8	6	Quarter Finals
2	Bangladesh Police FC	2	1	0	1	3	5	−2	3	Quarter Finals
3	Arambagh KS	2	0	0	2	2	8	−6	0	

Source: Soccerway

18 December 2019
16:00 BST

Dhaka Abahani	4–0	Bangladesh Police FC
Belfort 28', 71'; Jibon 32'; Chizoba 43'	Report

Bangabandhu National Stadium, Dhaka
Referee: Mizanur Rahman (Bangladesh)

21 December 2019
16:00 BST

Bangladesh Police FC	3–1	Arambagh KS
Rivera 32', 82'; Shadin 90+1'	Report	Ziku 89'

Bangabandhu National Stadium, Dhaka
Referee: Mohammad Jalaluddin (Bangladesh)

26 December 2019
16:00 BST

Arambagh KS	1–5	Dhaka Abahani
Murad 85'	Report	Chizoba 9'; Jibon 52'; Nasiruddin 57'; Mamunul 73'; Shitol 79'

Bangabandhu National Stadium, Dhaka
Referee: Mahmud Hasan Mamun (Bangladesh)

=== Group B ===
Pos	Team	Pld	W	D	L	GF	GA	GD	Pts	Qualification
1	Chittagong Abahani	2	2	0	0	4	0	+4	6	Quarter-Finals
2	Bashundhara Kings	2	1	0	1	1	2	−1	3	Quarter-Finals
3	Brothers Union	2	0	0	2	0	3	−3	0	

Source: Soccerway

19 December 2019
18:15 BST

Bashundhara Kings	1–0	Brothers Union
Kdouh 23'	Report

Bangabandhu National Stadium, Dhaka
Referee: GM Chowdhury Nayon (Bangladesh)

22 December 2019
18:15 BST

Brothers Union	0–2	Chittagong Abahani
	Report	Guylherme 34'; Chinedu 82'

Bangabandhu National Stadium, Dhaka
Referee: SH Sany (Bangladesh)

27 December 2019
15:30 BST

Chittagong Abahani	2–0	Bashundhara Kings
Rakib 25'; Brossou 45+2'	Report

Bangabandhu National Stadium, Dhaka
Referee: Mizanur Rahman (Bangladesh)

=== Group C ===
Pos	Team	Pld	W	D	L	GF	GA	GD	Pts	Qualification
1	Saif Sporting Club	2	1	1	0	3	1	+2	4	Quarter-Finals
2	Rahmatganj MFS	2	0	2	0	1	1	0	2	Quarter-Finals
3	Sheikh Jamal DC	2	0	1	1	2	4	−2	1	

Source: Soccerway

19 December 2019
15:30 BST

Saif Sporting Club	0–0	Rahmatganj MFS
	Report

Bangabandhu National Stadium, Dhaka
Referee: MZF Nahid (Bangladesh)

22 December 2019
15:30 BST

Rahmatganj MFS	1–1	Sheikh Jamal DC
Camara 61'	Report	Osagie 75'

Bangabandhu National Stadium, Dhaka
Referee: Shah Alam (Bangladesh)

27 December 2019
18:15 BST

Sheikh Jamal DC	1–3	Saif Sporting Club
Jobe 9'	Report	Yeasin 14'; Ergashev 85' (pen.); Akhmedov 90+5'

Bangabandhu National Stadium, Dhaka
Referee: MZF Nahid (Bangladesh)

=== Group D ===
Pos	Team	Pld	W	D	L	GF	GA	GD	Pts	Qualification
1	Muktijoddha SKC	3	1	2	0	4	3	+1	5	Quarter-Finals
2	Dhaka Mohammedan	3	1	2	0	2	1	+1	5	Quarter-Finals
3	Sheikh Russel KC	3	1	2	0	2	1	+1	5	
4	Uttar Baridhara SC	3	0	0	3	1	4	−3	0	

Source: Soccerway

20 December 2019
15:30 BST

Sheikh Russel KC	1–0	Uttar Baridhara SC
Odovin 18'	Report

Bangabandhu National Stadium, Dhaka
Referee: MH Mamun (Bangladesh)

20 December 2019
18:15 BST

Muktijoddha Sangsad KC	1–1	Dhaka Mohammedan
Anik 34'	Report	Bappy 3'

Bangabandhu National Stadium, Dhaka
Referee: Ferdous Ahamed (Bangladesh)

24 December 2019
15:30 BST

Uttar Baridhara SC	1–2	Muktijoddha Sangsad KC
Darboe 40'	Report	Bangoura 45+2'; Hashiguchi 74'

Bangabandhu National Stadium, Dhaka
Referee: Jashim Akhter (Bangladesh)
24 December 2019
18:15 BST

Dhaka Mohammedan	0–0	Sheikh Russel KC
	Report

Bangabandhu National Stadium, Dhaka
Referee: Bhovon Mohon Talukdar (Bangladesh)

28 December 2019
15:30 BST

Dhaka Mohammedan	1–0	Uttar Baridhara SC
Diabate 8'	Report

Bangabandhu National Stadium, Dhaka
Referee: Mohammad Jalaluddin (Bangladesh)
28 December 2019
18:15 BST

Sheikh Russel KC	1–1	Muktijoddha Sangsad KC
Azizov 12'	Report	Bangoura 51'

Bangabandhu National Stadium, Dhaka
Referee: Shah Alam (Bangladesh)

== Knockout stage ==
- All matches will play at Dhaka
- Times listed are UTC+6:00
- In the knockout stage, extra-time and a penalty shoot-out will used to decide the winner if necessary.

=== Bracket ===
Quarter-Finals

Semi-Finals

Final

30 December 2019

Dhaka Abahani
1 (3)

2 January 2020

Rahmatganj MFS
1 (4)

Rahmatganj MFS
1

30 December 2019

Dhaka Mohammedan
0

Chittagong Abahani
0

5 January 2020

Dhaka Mohammedan

2

Rahmatganj MFS
1

31 December 2019

Bashundhara Kings
2

Saif Sporting Club
1

3 January

Bangladesh Police FC
3

Bangladesh Police FC
0

31 December 2019

Bashundhara Kings
3

Muktijoddha Sangsad KC
1 (1)

Bashundhara Kings
1 (4)

=== Quarter-finals ===
30 December 2019
15:30 BST

Dhaka Abahani	1–1 (a.e.t.)	Rahmatganj MFS
Belfort 94'	Report	Gazi 119'
Penalties
Jibon (penalty scored); Belfort (penalty missed); Sohel (penalty scored); Nasiruddin (penalty scored); Chizoba (penalty missed)	3–4	Didarul (penalty scored); Akobir (penalty scored); Limon (penalty scored); Asrorov (penalty scored)

Bangabandhu National Stadium, Dhaka
Referee: Ferdous Ahamed (Bangladesh)
30 December 2019
18:30 BST

Chittagong Abahani	0–2	Dhaka Mohammedan
	Report	Shahed 25'; Diabate 30'

Bangabandhu National Stadium, Dhaka
Referee: Bhovon Mohon Talukdar (Bangladesh)

31 December 2019
15:30 BST

Saif Sporting Club	1–3	Bangladesh Police FC
Akhmedov 55'	Report	Bablu 31'; Rivera 45+1', 52'

Bangabandhu National Stadium, Dhaka
Referee: Mizanur Rahman (Bangladesh)
31 December 2019
18:30 BST

Muktijoddha Sangsad KC	1–1 (a.e.t.)	Bashundhara Kings
Royel 76'	Report	Kdouh 3'
Penalties
Hashiguchi (penalty missed); Tariqul (penalty missed); Biyaga (penalty scored)	1–4	Duyshobekov (penalty scored); Delmonte (penalty scored); Fahad (penalty scored); Colindres (penalty scored)

Bangabandhu National Stadium, Dhaka
Referee: GM Chowdhury Nayan (Bangladesh)

=== Semi-finals ===
2 January 2020
16:00 BST

Rahmatganj MFS	1–0	Dhaka Mohammedan
Turaev 16'	Report

Bangabandhu National Stadium, Dhaka
Referee: Jalal Uddin (Bangladesh)

3 January 2020
16:00 BST

Bangladesh Police FC	0–3	Bashundhara Kings
	Report	Topu 16'; Colindres 49'; Delmonte 90+2'

Bangabandhu National Stadium, Dhaka
Referee: Saymoon Hasan Sany (Bangladesh)

=== Final ===
5 January 2020
16:00 BST

Rahmatganj MFS	1–2	Bashundhara Kings
Bah 63'	Report	Colindres 41', 76'

Bangabandhu National Stadium, Dhaka
Referee: Jalal Uddin (Bangladesh)

== Goalscorers ==
There have been 51 goals scored in 22 matches, for an average of 2.32 goals per match.

4 goals

- (Puerto Rico) Sidney Rivera (Bangladesh Police FC)

3 goals

- (Costa Rica) Daniel Colindres (Bashundhara Kings)
- (Haiti) Kervens Belfort (Dhaka Abahani)

2 goals

- (Bangladesh) Nabib Newaj Jibon (Dhaka Abahani)
- (Guinea) Ismael Bangoura (Muktijoddha Sangsad KC)
- (Kyrgyzstan) Murolimzhon Akhmedov (Saif Sporting Club)
- (Lebanon) Mohamad Jalal Kdouh(Bashundhara Kings)
- (Mali) Souleymane Diabate (Dhaka Mohammedan)
- (Nigeria) Sunday Chizoba (Dhaka Abahani)

1 goal

- (Argentina) Nicolas Delmonte (Bashundhara Kings)
- (Bangladesh) Amir Hakim Bappy (Dhaka Mohammedan)
- (Bangladesh) Enamul Islam Gazi (Rahmatganj MFS)
- (Bangladesh) Faisal Ahmed Shitol (Dhaka Abahani)
- (Bangladesh) Jakir Hossain Ziku (Arambagh KS)
- (Bangladesh) Mamunul Islam (Dhaka Abahani)
- (Bangladesh) Mehedi Hasan Royal (Muktijoddha Sangsad KC)
- Mohammad Shadin (Bangladesh Police FC)
- (Bangladesh) Murad Chowdhury (Arambagh KS)
- (Bangladesh) Nasiruddin Chowdhury (Dhaka Abahani)
- (Bangladesh) Rakib Hossain (Chittagong Abahani)
- (Bangladesh) Shah Alamgir Anik (Muktijoddha Sangsad KC)
- (Bangladesh) Shahed Hossain (Dhaka Mohammedan)
- M. S. Bablu (Bangladesh Police FC)
- (Bangladesh) Topu Barman (Bashundhara Kings)
- (Bangladesh) Yeasin Arafat (Saif Sporting Club)
- (Brazil) Nixon Guylherme (Chittagong Abahani)
- (Ivory Coast) Kpehi Didier Brossou (Chittagong Abahani)
- (The Gambia) Landing Darboe (Uttar Baridhara SC)
- (The Gambia) Momodou Bah (Rahmatganj MFS)
- (The Gambia) Omar Jobe (Sheikh Jamal Dhanmondi Club)
- (Guinea) Younoussa Camara (Rahmatganj MFS)
- (Japan) Norito Hashiguchi (Muktijoddha Sangsad KC)
- (Nigeria) Matthew Chinedu (Chittagong Abahani)
- (Nigeria) Monday Osagie (Sheikh Jamal Dhanmondi Club)
- (Nigeria) Raphael Odovin Onwrebe (Sheikh Russel KC)
- (Tajikistan) Jahongir Ergashev (Saif Sporting Club)
- (Uzbekistan) Alisher Azizov (Sheikh Russel KC)
- (Uzbekistan) Akobir Turaev (Rahmatganj MFS)

== Sponsored by ==
The title sponsor of 2019–20 Bangladesh Federation Cup is TVS Motor Company.

== Broadcast partners ==
- The private satellite TV channel Bangla TV will live telecast all matches from the stadium.

== See also ==
- 2019–20 Bangladesh Premier League
- 2020 National Football Championship
- 2020 Bangabandhu Cup
- 2019 Bangamata U-19 Women's Gold Cup
- 2019 Sheikh Kamal International Club Cup
- 2020 Bangladesh Women's Football League
- 2019 BFF U-18 Football Tournament
- 2018–19 Bangladesh Championship League
- 2019 Dhaka Senior Division League
