= Sunday Chizoba =

Nigerian footballer

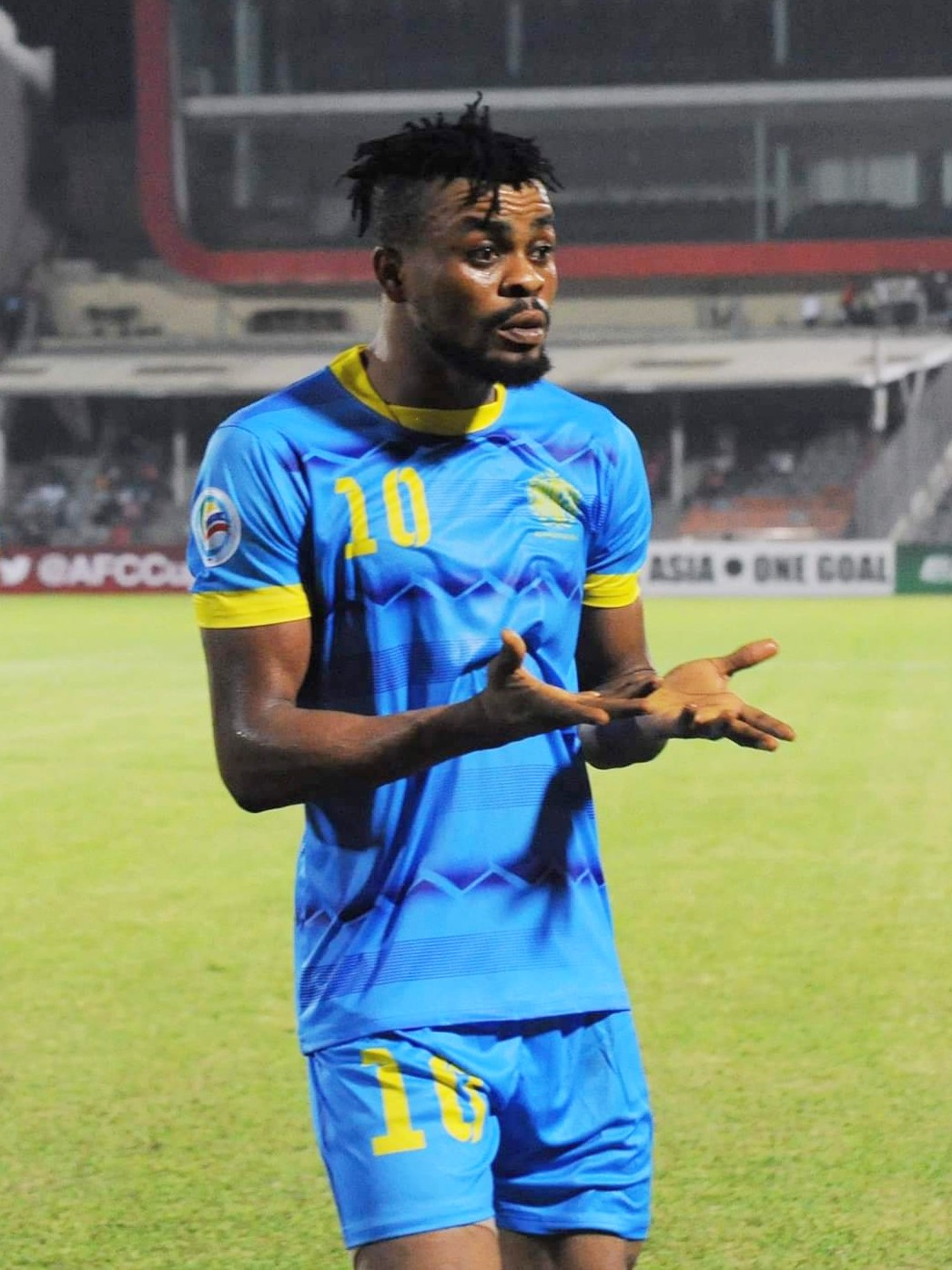
- Sunday in 2019 AFC Cup with Dhaka Abahani

Personal information
- Full name: Sunday Chizoba Nwadialu
- Date of birth: 10 October 1989 (age 37)
- Place of birth: Nigeria
- Height: 1.84 m (6 ft 0 in)
- Position: Striker

Team information
- Current team: Brothers Union
- Number: 18

Senior career*
Years	Team	Apps	(Gls)
2010–2011	Crown FC		
2010–2011	Dhaka Mohammedan	11	(12)
2011–2012	Muktijoddha Sangsad KC		(15)
2012–2013	Sheikh Jamal DC		(7)
2013–2014	Muktijoddha Sangsad KC		(15)
2014–2015	Churchill Brothers S.C.		
2015–2016	Dhaka Abahani	27	(29)
2017–2021	Dhaka Abahani	51	(42)
2021–2022	Rahmatganj MFS	21	(12)
2025–	Brothers Union	0	(0)
- * Club domestic league appearances and goals as of August 2022

Sunday Chizoba Nwadialu (born 10 October 1989) is a Nigerian professional footballer who plays as a striker for Bangladesh Premier League club Brothers Union.

== Career ==
On 23 November 2018, he scored twice against Bashundhara Kings in the final of 2018 Bangladesh Federation Cup.

On 15 June 2019, he scored the hat-trick against Rahmatganj MFS in 2018-19 Bangladesh Football Premier League.

On 21 August 2019, he scored twice against North Korean club April 25 in the 2019 AFC Cup.

== Honours ==
Dhaka Abahani

- Bangladesh Premier League: 2016, 2018
- Federation Cup: 2017, 2018
