= Nasiruddin Chowdhury =

Bangladeshi footballer

Personal information
- Full name: Nasiruddin Chowdhury
- Date of birth: 9 October 1979 (age 47)
- Place of birth: Chittagong, Bangladesh
- Height: 1.75 m (5 ft 9 in)
- Positions: Centre back; defensive midfielder

Youth career
- Chittagong Pioneer XI

Senior career*
Years	Team	Apps	(Gls)
1998–2008	Bangladesh Army	0	(0)
2009	Chittagong Mohammedan	0	(0)
2009–2010	Dhaka Mohammedan	24	(6)
2010–2012	Muktijoddha	38	(3)
2012–2015	Sheikh Jamal	56	(4)
2016	Sheikh Russel	0	(0)
2016–2017	Chittagong Abahani	?	(1)
2017–2018	Dhaka Abahani	22	(6)
2018–2019	Bashundhara Kings	20	(3)
2019–2021	Dhaka Abahani	27	(1)
2021–22	Sheikh Russel	19	(1)
2022–2024	Chittagong Abahani	25	(3)

International career
2010–2019	Bangladesh	25	(1)
- * Club domestic league appearances and goals

Nasiruddin Chowdhury (Bengali: নাসিরউদ্দিন চৌধুরী; born 9 October 1979) is a Bangladeshi former professional footballer who played as a centre-back. He last played for Bangladesh Premier League club Chittagong Abahani. He represented the Bangladesh national team from 2010 to 2019. He is the oldest ever player to play in the Bangladesh Premier League.

== Club career ==
=== Early years ===
Born in Chittagong, Nasir played football using his tuition fees. He did not even have boots before giving trials for Chittagong Pioneer Football League clubs. When the Chittagong League was postponed, a friend of Nasir's encouraged him to participate in a trial for the Bangladesh Army Football Team, and although his parents were hesitant, Nasir impressed in the trials and ended up getting selected by the army officials. Nasir started his career with the army at the 28 East Bengal Regiment of Chittagong Cantonment. After completing his military training, Nasir travelled to Sri Lanka in 2000 as, the Bangladesh Army participated in a football tournament held to celebrate the 50th anniversary of Sri Lanka Army. Former Bangladesh national team coach György Kottán was impressed by Nasir's performance during a friendly match between the Army team and the Bangladesh national team at BKSP and offered him a chance to play in the national team. However, the army officials did not give him permission to leave duty.

In 2004, the Army were the runners-up at the Sher-e-Bangla Cup (losing to Narayanganj) and Nasir finished as the top-scorer with 5 goals. In 2006, Nasir went to the United Nations peacekeeping mission in Liberia. There he met legendary footballer George Weah. After this encounter, Nasir decided to quit his job in the army and in 2008, he filed a petition with the authorities and returned home. Nevertheless, he was unable to play for any professional club as he was yet to receive permission from the army. Former national goalkeeper Aminul Haque came forward to help him. With the help of the then director of Muktijoddha Sangsad, Major General Amin Ahmed Chowdhury, he finally got a clearance from the army. The next year he joined his hometown club Chittagong Mohammedan.

=== Professional league career ===
After seeing Nasir's performance in the 2009 Super Cup, tournament winning coach Maruful Haque brought Nasir to Dhaka Mohammedan the same year before the 2009–10 Citycell Premier League. Nasir went onto score 6 league goals that season mainly playing as a striker. Nasir went on to join Muktijoddha Sangsad, and played for the club for the next to years. On 3 Jun 2012, he scored a crucial goal against Brothers Union to keep Muktijoddha in the title race, however in the end Nasir failed to win his first league title with the club. The same year Nasir joined rising giants Sheikh Jamal DC where he went onto make win the Bangladesh Premier League and Federation Cup title twice, during his three years with them. During his time at the Dhanmondi-based club, Nasir was often used as a striker turned defender due to his eye for a goal. He scored twice against Chittagong Abahani during the 2013–14 season putting his team six point clear at the top of the table, in the end Sheikh Jamal went onto win their second league title that year. He was also regular with Sheikh Jamal DC & Sheikh Russel KC during continental competitions, the following half a decade. In 2016, Nasir returned once more to Chittagong, this time with Chittagong Abahani. He scored during the group-stages of the 2017 Sheikh Kamal International Club Cup against Manang Marshyangdi. He also represented Sheikh Russel in the 2017 AFC Cup qualifying round.

In 2017, Nasir joined Dhaka Abahani. He scored the first in a 2–0 win over his former club Sheikh Jamal DC, the win saw Abahani win a record of six Bangladesh Premier League titles. Throughout the season Nasir scored six league goals, again showcasing his goal scoring ability. He was the second highest local goal scorer and was only one goal behind Tawhidul Alam Sabuz, who mainly played as a forward. In 2018, Nasir was caught in a controversy, as he took an advance of Tk 3 lakh from Abahani, confirming he would stay at the club; but later he joined newcomers Bashundhara Kings. Nasir escaped a one-year ban from Bangladesh Football Federation even after Abahani filed a complaint against him. He won the league title once more and scored three goals along the way, the following year Nasir returned to Abahani. However, his second stint at the club was disappointing, as an aging Abahani team failed to win the league title once more, losing out to Bashundhara Kings. He would also represent the club at the 2019 AFC Cup. The following year Abahani released all of there veteran players including Nasir, who went onto join Sheikh Russel KC in 2021.

According to IFFHS, Chowdhury was the fifth-oldest player (and oldest outfield player) to play a match in the top tier of a national league in 2023, aged 43 years and 279 days in his last Bangladesh Premier League game in 2023 against Muktijoddha on 15 July. In the following year, however, he was the outright oldest player to do so, aged 44 years and 219 days, ahead of Brazilian goalkeeper Fábio in Série A, aged 44 years and 69 days. On 23 August 2024, Nasir announced his retirement from professional football, however, he also stated that he would continue playing in the Chittagong Football League for another season.

== International career ==
Serbian coach Zoran Đorđević was the first to include Nasir in the Bangladesh national team. He mainly played as a defender as per the coaches preference. He started his international career during the 2010 AFC Challenge Cup, in Sri Lanka. Nasir captained Bangladesh at the 2013 SAFF Championship, where he injured his head after a collision with Indian defender Nirmal Chettri. In 2014, Nasir was appointed vice-captain for an exhibition match against India. He scored his first international goal against Singapore during a friendly in 2015.

== Career statistics ==
=== International apps ===
As of 29 August 2018.

Bangladesh
Year	Apps	Goals
2010	2	0
2011	0	0
2012	3	0
2013	5	0
2014	3	0
2015	6	1
2016	4	0
2017	2	0
Total	25	1

=== International goals ===
#	Date	Venue	Opponent	Score	Result	Competition	Ref.
-	6 February 2015	National Stadium, Dhaka	Thailand U23	1–0	1–0	Bangabandhu Cup	
1.	30 May 2015	National Stadium, Dhaka	Singapore	1–0	1–2	International friendly	

== Honours ==
Sheikh Jamal Dhanmondi Club

- Bangladesh Premier League: 2013–14, 2014–15
- Federation Cup: 2013, 2015
- King's Cup (Bhutan): 2014

Abahani Limited

- Bangladesh Premier League: 2017–18
- Federation Cup: 2017

Bashundhara Kings

- Bangladesh Premier League: 2019
- Independence Cup: 2018

Individual

- 2004 − Sher-e-Bangla Cup Top Scorer Award.
- 2004 − Sher-e-Bangla Cup Best Player Award.
- 2014 − Sports Writers Association's Footballer of the Year.
