= Marcos Vinícius (footballer, born 28 July 1991) =

Brazilian footballer

Personal information
- Full name: Marcos Vinícius da Costa Soares da Silva
- Date of birth: 28 July 1991 (age 35)
- Place of birth: Bauru, Brazil
- Height: 1.85 m (6 ft 1 in)
- Position: Forward

Senior career*
Years	Team	Apps	(Gls)
2013	Monte Azul	8	(0)
2014	Votuporanguense	18	(6)
2014–15	Inter de Limeira	36	(7)
2015	Audax Rio	9	(1)
2016	Noroeste	16	(7)
2017	Army United		
2018	Police Tero	32	(15)
2018–2019	Bashundhara Kings	24	(14)
2020	Nongbua Pitchaya	2	(0)
- * Club domestic league appearances and goals as of 08 July 2019

Marcos Vinícius da Costa Soares da Silva (born 28 July 1991), known as Marcos Vinícius, is a Brazilian footballer who plays as a forward.
