= Daniel Colindres =

Costa Rican footballer (born 1985)

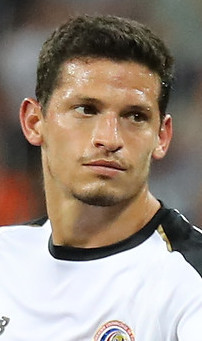
- Colindres with Costa Rica at the 2018 FIFA World Cup

Personal information
- Full name: Daniel Colindres Solera
- Date of birth: 10 January 1985 (age 41)
- Place of birth: Alajuela, Costa Rica
- Height: 1.80 m (5 ft 11 in)
- Position: Forward

Team information
- Current team: Sporting San José
- Number: 14

Youth career
- Deportivo Saprissa

Senior career*
Years	Team	Apps	(Gls)
2010–2018	Saprissa	244	(61)
2010–2012	→ Guápiles (loan)	43	(9)
2013–2014	→ Puntarenas (loan)	20	(7)
2018–2020	Bashundhara Kings	29	(15)
2021	Saprissa	37	(9)
2021–2023	Dhaka Abahani	53	(33)
2023–2025	Municipal Liberia	81	(22)
2025–2026	Puntarenas	30	(2)
2026–	Sporting San José	0	(0)

International career^{‡}
2011–2018	Costa Rica	17	(0)
- * Club domestic league appearances and goals as of 27 May 2026 ‡ National team caps and goals as of 11 September 2018

Daniel Colindres Solera (born 10 January 1985) is a Costa Rican professional footballer who plays as a forward for Liga FPD club Sporting San José.

== Club career ==
Colindres came through the youth ranks at Saprissa and made his debut with the first team in 2010. After appearing in three matches for Saprissa, he was loaned to Guápiles. With Guápiles he appeared in 43 matches scoring 9 goals. In 2012, he returned to Saprissa and appeared in 32 matches scoring 5 goals in his second stint with the club. He was again loaned out in January 2013, for six months to Puntarenas. With Puntarenas he scored 7 goals in 20 matches. Upon returning to Saprissa, Colindres became an important attacking player for the club, playing primarily as a winger and being noted for his pace and play making ability. During his time with the club he helped Saprissa in capturing 5 domestic titles.

On 13 September 2018, Colindres moved abroad for the first time in his career and joined Bangladeshi club Bashundhara Kings on a nine-month contract, becoming the first ever Costa Rican World Cup player to play in Bangladesh.

On 25 September 2021, Colindres officially returned to the Bangladesh Premier League this time joining Abahani Limited Dhaka.

== International career ==
Colindres made his debut for Costa Rica in a September 2011 friendly match against the USA.

In May 2018, he was named in Costa Rica's 23 man squad for the 2018 FIFA World Cup in Russia.

== Career statistics ==
=== International ===
As of 11 September 2018

Costa Rica
Year	Apps	Goals
2011	2	0
2012	1	0
2013	0	0
2014	0	0
2015	3	0
2016	1	0
2017	3	0
2018	7	0
Total	17	0

== Honours ==
Saprissa

- Liga FPD: Clausura 2010, Clausura 2014, Apertura 2014, Apertura 2015, Apertura 2016, Clausura 2018, Clausura 2021
- Costa Rican Cup: 2013

Bashundhara Kings

- Bangladesh Premier League: 2018–19
- Independence Cup: 2019
- Bangladesh Federation Cup: 2020

Dhaka Abahani

- Independence Cup: 2021–22
- Federation Cup: 2021–22

== Personal life ==
Colindres' father, Santiago, was originally from Honduras.
