= Motin Mia =

Bangladeshi footballer

Personal information
- Full name: Mohammed Motin Mia
- Date of birth: 20 December 1998 (age 27)
- Place of birth: Sylhet, Bangladesh
- Height: 1.68 m (5 ft 6 in)
- Positions: Right winger; striker

Senior career*
Years	Team	Apps	(Gls)
2014	T&T Club Motijheel	6	(6)
2016–2018	Saif Sporting Club	33	(9)
2018–2024	Bashundhara Kings	69	(16)

International career^{‡}
2018–2022	Bangladesh U23	2	(0)
2018–2023	Bangladesh	20	(2)
- * Club domestic league appearances and goals as of 23 February 2024 ‡ National team caps and goals as of 3 October 2026

Mohammed Motin Mia (Bengali: মোহাম্মাদ মতিন মিয়া), also spelled as Matin Miah, is a Bangladeshi professional footballer who plays as a winger or center forward. He last played for Bangladesh Premier League club Bashundhara Kings and the Bangladesh national team.

== Club career ==
Motin scored 5 goals from 12 matches, won the player of the tournament award during 2016 Bangladesh Championship League, and helped his club to get promoted to Bangladesh Premier League.

On 5 August 2017, his solitary goal against Arambagh KS earned his club its first ever victory in a professional league game.

On 26 December 2018, Motin scored the all-important goal for his side Bashundhara Kings to lay their hands on their first silverware in top-flight football in the fifth minute of extra time of the final of the Independence Cup.

== International career ==
=== U23 ===
On 16 August 2018, Motin made his U23 debut against Thailand U-23 during 2018 Asian Games.

#	Date	Venue	Opponent	Score	Result	Competition
1	6 August 2018	Mokpo International Football Center, Mokpo	(South Korea) Chodang University FC	2–1	3-1	Unofficial friendly

=== Senior team ===
On 5 October 2018, Motin made his senior debut against Philippines during a 2018 Bangabandhu Cup match.

On 19 January 2020, Motin netted his first international goal against Sri Lanka during 2020 Bangabandhu Cup in the 17th minute after collecting a fine lob from Manik. The forward cut inside Sri Lankan defender Jude Supan at the top of the box before hitting past the keeper's gloves. The winger, who hailed from Sylhet, doubled the lead after the hour mark with a cool finish. After snatching possession from the same defender at the halfway line, Matin got only the opponent goalkeeper in front of him and he skillfully dribbled past the custodian before rolling the ball in the net.

== International goals ==
=== National team ===
Scores and results list Bangladesh's goal tally first.

No.	Date	Venue	Opponent	Score	Result	Competition
1.	19 January 2020	Bangabandhu National Stadium, Dhaka	Sri Lanka	1–0	3–0	2020 Bangabandhu Cup
2.	19 January 2020	Bangabandhu National Stadium, Dhaka	Sri Lanka	2–0	3–0	2020 Bangabandhu Cup
