= Tawhidul Alam Sabuz =

Bangladeshi footballer

Tawhidul Sabuz
Personal information
- Full name: Tawhidul Alam Sabuz
- Date of birth: 14 September 1990 (age 36)
- Place of birth: Cox's Bazar, Bangladesh
- Height: 1.67 m (5 ft 5 1/2 in)
- Position: Striker

Senior career*
| Years | Team | Apps | (Gls) |
| 2005–2007 | Chittagong Abahani | | |
| 2007–2008 | Fakirerpool YMC | | (13) |
| 2009–2010 | Farashganj SC | | (6) |
| 2010–2013 | Sheikh Jamal DC | | (4) |
| 2013–2016 | Mohammedan SC | | (18) |
| 2017–2018 | Chittagong Abahani | 20 | (8) |
| 2018–2024 | Bashundhara Kings | 61 | (10) |

International career^{‡}
| 2010–2020 | Bangladesh | 8 | (0) |
Medal record
Representing Bangladesh
South Asian Games
| Gold medal – first place | 2010 |
- * Club domestic league appearances and goals as of 29 May 2024 ‡ National team caps and goals as of 6 June 2019

Tawhidul Alam Sabuz is a Bangladeshi professional footballer who plays as a forward. He last played for Bangladesh Premier League club Bashundhara Kings. He has also represented Bangladesh national team from 2010 to 2020.

== International goals ==
U-17 Team

| # | Date | Venue | Opponent | Score | Result | Competition |
|---|---|---|---|---|---|---|
| 1. | 21 November 2005 | Bangabandhu National Stadium, Dhaka | Sri Lanka | 1–0 | 3–0 | 2006 AFC U-17 Championship qualification |
| 2. | 14 August 2006 | Thiên Trường Stadium, Nam Định | Laos | 1–0 | 2–1 | 2006 AFF U-17 Youth Championship |

Olympic Team

| # | Date | Venue | Opponent | Score | Result | Competition |
|---|---|---|---|---|---|---|
| 1. | 5 February 2010 | Bangabandhu National Stadium, Dhaka | India | 1–0 | 1–0 | 2010 South Asian Games |
| 2. | 8 February 2010 | Bangabandhu National Stadium, Dhaka | Afghanistan | 4–0 | 4–0 | 2010 South Asian Games |

Senior National Team

| No | Date | Venue | Opponent | Score | Result | Competition |
|---|---|---|---|---|---|---|
| 1. | 23 March 2018 | Leo Stadium, Bangkok, Thailand | (Thailand) BG Pathum United | 2–1 | 4–3 | Unofficial Friendly |
| 2. | 23 March 2018 | Leo Stadium, Bangkok, Thailand | (Thailand) BG Pathum United | 3–1 | 4–3 | Unofficial Friendly |
| 3. | 23 March 2018 | Leo Stadium, Bangkok, Thailand | (Thailand) BG Pathum United | 4–3 | 4–3 | Unofficial Friendly |
| 4. | 1 June 2019 | Leo Stadium, Bangkok, Thailand | (Thailand) BG Pathum United | 1–0 | 3–0 | Unofficial Friendly |
| 5. | 1 June 2019 | Leo Stadium, Bangkok, Thailand | (Thailand) BG Pathum United | 3–0 | 3–0 | Unofficial Friendly |
| 6. | 7 November 2019 | Muscat, Oman | (Oman) Muscat Club | 3–1 | 3–1 | Unofficial Friendly |

Bashundhara Kings

| # | Date | Venue | Opponent | Score | Result | Competition |
|---|---|---|---|---|---|---|
| 1. | 21 September 2018 | Sheikh Kamal Stadium, Nilphamari | (Maldives) New Radiant SC | 2–0 | 4–1 | Preseason Friendly |
