= Bashundhara Kings =

Association football club in Bangladesh

- Full name: Bashundhara Kings
- Nickname: The Kings
- Short name: BDK
- Founded: 2013; 13 years ago
- Ground: Bashundhara Kings Arena
- Capacity: 6,000
- Owner: Bashundhara Group
- President: Imrul Hasan
- Manager: Bayazid Alam Zubair Nipu
- League: Bangladesh Football League
- 2025–26: Bangladesh Football League, 1st of 10
- Website: bashundharakings.com
| Home colours | Away colours |

Bashundhara Kings (Bengali: বসুন্ধরা কিংস, Bengali pronunciation: [boʃundʱɔra kiŋs]) is a professional football club based in Bashundhara Residential Area, Dhaka, Bangladesh. The club competes in the Bangladesh Premier League, the top tier of the Bangladesh football league system. The club was established in 2013 and debuted in Bangladesh Premier League during the 2018–19 season. The club is owned and managed by Bashundhara Group.

== History ==
=== Inception ===
The club started their football journey with 2016 DCC (N&S) Pioneer League, where they finished in 3rd position. The club were promoted to Third Division Football League but they decided to play Bangladesh Championship League, which is the second-tier league of the country, by fulfilling all the conditions to participate. In March 2017, the club got the green signal from Bangladesh Football Federation to participate.

On 13 May 2017, the club completed their player registration for the 2017 Bangladesh Championship League. Former national team striker Rokonuzzaman Kanchan was named as captain for the season by the club officials.

=== 2017–18 season ===
Bashundhara Kings played their first official match against Uttar Baridhara SC on 7 August 2017 during the 2017 Bangladesh Championship League. Ripon Biswas scored the first-ever goal for the club in the same match.

On 18 August 2017, the club tasted their maiden victory in the league where they beat NoFeL Sporting Club by 1–0 goal. Captain Rokonuzzaman Kanchan scored the winning goal for his club.

On 4 November 2017, Kings confirm their participation at Premier League as they clinch the title of 2017 Bangladesh Championship League after a dramatic 2–1 victory over Agrani Bank with one match remaining.

They even had the luxury of fielding the club's president-cum-player Md Imrul Hassan, as a striker for a few minutes before the final whistle. Imrul, who did not play in any of the previous matches did not get to touch the ball, but was nevertheless happy to indulge in the winning feeling with his players.

Veteran striker Kanchan scored 11 goals for the club and was the second-top scorer of the tournament after Ariful Islam scored 12 goals for NoFeL Sporting Club. On 11 November 2017, Bangladesh Football Federation handed over the champion trophy to the club, which is the first-ever domestic trophy for the club.

=== 2018–19 season ===
On 29 July 2018, Bashundhara Kings officially started their player transfer formalities for upcoming 2018–19 season as they inked the contract papers with forward Tawhidul Alam Sabuz, defender Nurul Nayeem Faisal and midfielder Mohammad Ibrahim during the signing ceremony.
On 5 September 2018, the club officially announced the name of Spaniard Oscar Bruzon as their new head coach for upcoming season. He is also the first-ever foreign coach appointed by the club.
On 16 September 2018, Bashundhara Kings formally inked the deal with Costa Rican forward Daniel Colindres for 2018–19 season. Colindres was part of the 23-man Costa Rica squad for the 2018 FIFA World Cup.
On 21 September 2018, Kings played their first-ever home match at Sheikh Kamal Stadium against New Radiant SC from Maldives during a friendly match. The Kings completely obliterated their opponent by 4–1 goals where Haitian forward Kervens Belfort, Gambian forward Ousman Jallow and local forwards Tawhidul Alam Sabuz and Mahbubur Rahman Sufil scored one goal apiece in this international club friendly.

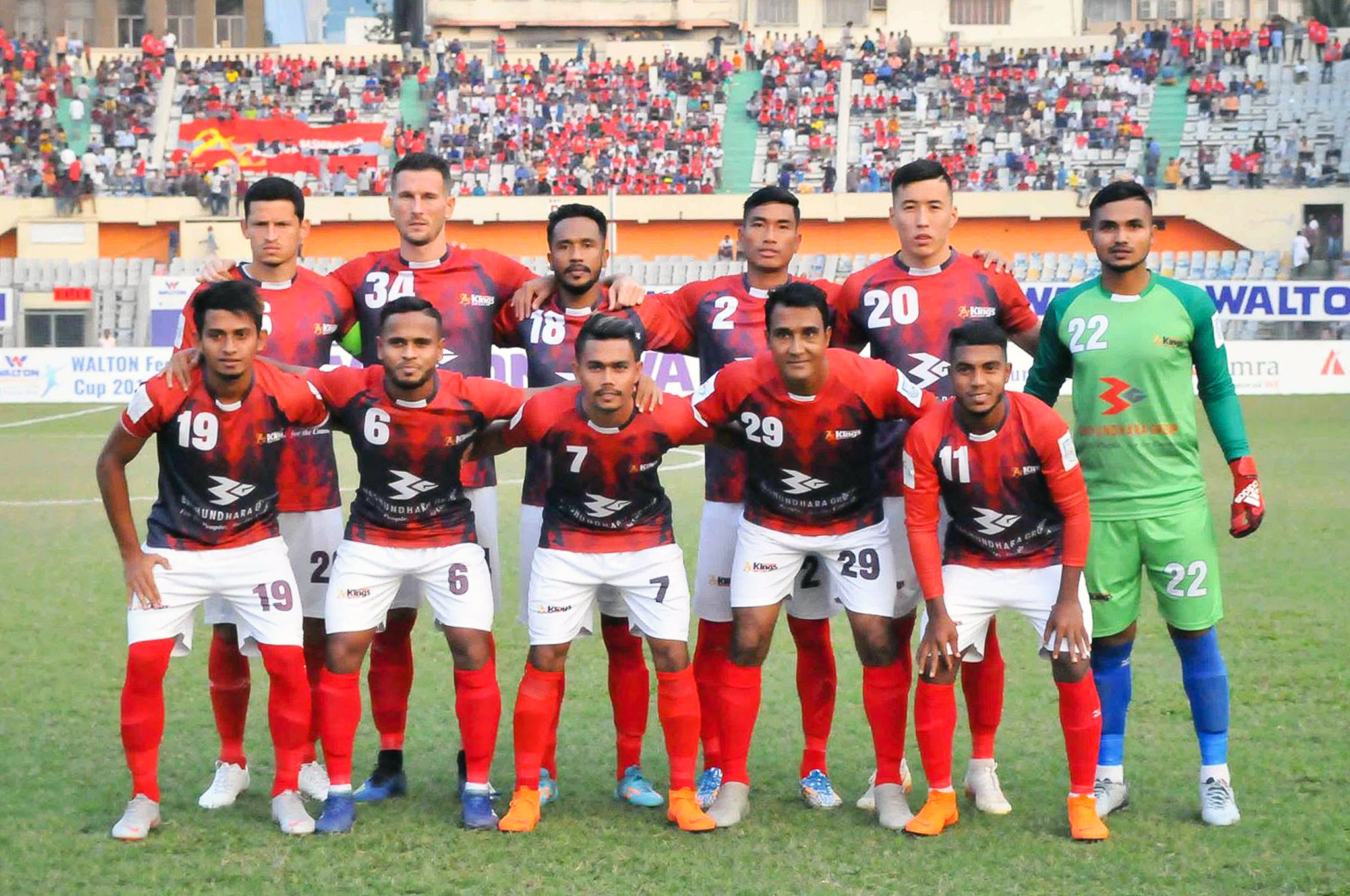
Bashundhara Kings starting XI for Federation Cup 2018 final

On 13 October, the club completed their player registration for upcoming season. The club submitted a list of 32 registered players to BFF including three foreign footballers.

On 29 October 2018, The Kings started their 2018 Bangladesh Federation Cup journey as they beat falling giant Dhaka Mohammedan 5–2, thanks largely down to Colindres' brilliant performance. World Cupper Daniel Colindres was on fire again as his treble powered his team into the semifinals of the tournament with an imposing 5–1 win over Team BJMC in the last quarterfinal. In the semifinal, Tawhidul Alam Sabuz came on from the bench in the 70th minute, scoring the winning goal in the extra time to make it 1–0 against Sheikh Russel KC and carried the Kings to the final. But they lost the final 3–1 to Dhaka Abahani on 23 November.

On 2 December 2018, Bashundhara Kings kicked off their 2018 Independence Cup campaign with a dominant 2–0 win over Sheikh Jamal Dhanmondi Club. On 14 December 2018, Goalkeeper Anisur Rahman Zico's heroic performance in shootout after Costa Rican Daniel Colindres' shining display helped Kings edge a spirited Rahmatganj MFS 3–2 in tiebreak in the fourth quarterfinal of the tournament. On 20 December 2018, Another heroic performance by goalkeeper Anisur Rahman Zico propelled Bashundhara Kings to the Independence Cup final with a 7–6 win on penalties over Dhaka Abahani. On 26 December 2018, Bashundhara Kings laid their hands on their first silverware in top-flight football with a 2–1 win against former champions Sheikh Russel KC in an entertaining final of the Walton Independence Cup, thanks to an extra-time goal from substitute forward Motin Mia after Marcos Vinicius's early strike was cancelled out by Sheikh Russel's Raphael Odovin in the stoppage time of the first half.

On 19 January 2019, Kings won their debut encounter of the league by prevailing over Sheikh Jamal Dhanmondi Club by 1-0 goal. Marcos Vinicius scored the lone goal of the match to help Kings triumph. On 23 January 2019, Bashundhara Kings made a dream debut in their home ground Sheikh Kamal Stadium as they beat defending champions Dhaka Abahani by 3–0 margin.

On 7 July 2019, Bashundhara Kings beat Team BJMC 2–0 at Sheikh Kamal Stadium in Nilphamari on Sunday afternoon to further bolster their position at the top of the BPL table. It was Bashundhara Kings' 12th straight victory of the season—the longest winning streak in the history of BPL.

On 25 July 2019, Bashundhara Kings have clinched the title of Bangladesh Premier League 2018–2019 season creating history by claiming the title in their maiden appearance with their 1-1 goal draw against Mohammedan Sporting Club Ltd at Sheikh Kamal Stadium in Nilphamari on Thursday. The star-studded Bashundhara Kings emerged new champions with two matches to spare. Bashundhara Kings became the first team to claim the title in their maiden run in the league since the introduction of the professional league in the nation. This is the second major soccer trophy for Bashundhara Kings in the season after the Independence Cup Football after finishing runners-up in the season's curtain raiser meet—Federation Cup Football. On 3 August 2019, Bashundhara Kings concluded their memorable debut season in the Bangladesh Premier League with a 1–1 draw against Chittagong Abahani Limited. In what was a dominant league performance throughout the season, the Kings lost only once, against Sheikh Russel Krira Chakra, and finished with 63 points from 24 matches.

=== 2019–20 season ===
On 7 November 2019, it was revealed that Kings signed Bangladesh-origin Finland right-back Tariq Kazi to bolster their defense for the upcoming season. On 2 February 2020, former Argentina international Hernan Barcos will be signed for Bangladesh Premier League champions Bashundhara Kings in their upcoming AFC Cup campaign and the second phase of the league, confirmed club president Imrul Hassan.

On 11 March 2020, Argentine striker Hernan Barcos made a remarkable debut in Bangladesh with four goals scored as Bashundhara Kings kicked off their maiden 2020 AFC Cup campaign from Group E with a dominating 5–1 win over TC Sports Club. Barcos, who featured for Argentina four times, headed his first two goals within half an hour before netting two more after the break, while skipper Daniel Colindres added the other to record Bashundhara's biggest win of the season. It was arguably the best performance of the season from the Kings whose goalkeeper Anisur Rahman Zico also starred in between the posts by making three penalty saves, one of which was scored on the rebound during Easa Ismail's equalizer, while the other was retaken and saved again with a dive to his left.

On 17 May 2020, The BFF executive committee, following an emergency meeting, declared the 12th edition of the league abandoned, scrapping promotion and relegation while canceling the Independence Cup from the calendar as a precaution to combat the spread of coronavirus in the country. On 10 June 2020, Bashundhra Kings released their Costa Rican World-Cupper Daniel Colindres after a nearly two-year stint with the club. On 5 August 2020, Bashundhara Kings announced their new signing Robson Robinho for the AFC Cup and forthcoming football season as the Brazilian winger is all set to join the Bangladesh side on loan from Fluminense FC for a year. On 21 August 2020, Midfielder Jonathan Fernandes, who last played for Brazilian top-tier outfit Botafogo, joined the club.

On 10 September 2020, Kings' journey in their debut AFC Cup campaign ended after just a single match. Kings took pole position in Group E with a 5–1 thrashing of TC Sports of Maldives in their opening fixture on 11 March, but the Bangladesh giants' campaign stalled when coronavirus spread throughout the continent, forcing the AFC to reschedule the remaining group matches at centralised venues before its cancellation.

=== 2020–21 season ===
On 19 September 2020, Kings sealed an agreement with Iranian defender Khaled Shafiei as the club's fourth and last foreign recruit for the 2020–21 season. On 31 October 2020, Kings roped in Argentine-born Chilean footballer Raúl Becerra as its fourth foreigner. Raul played in the place of his compatriot Hernan Barcos who left the club after the 10-month-contract expiry in October.

On 22 December 2020, Bashundhara Kings kicked off the domestic season with a comfortable 3–0 win over Rahmatganj MFS in the inaugural game of 2020–21 Federation Cup. On 10 January 2021, Kings retained the title of Federation Cup for successive time as they beat Saif Sporting Club by 1–0 margin in the 32nd edition final. Raúl Becerra netted the match-winner in the 52nd minute as the Kings bagged their first trophy in the new season. This was the fifth goal in five matches for Becerra, moving him to the joint top of the list with Saif forward Kenneth Ikechukwu.

On 13 January 2021, Defending Champions Kings kicked off the Bangladesh Premier League with a comfortable 2–0 victory over Uttar Baridhara Club. On 9 August 2021, Defending champions Bashundhara Kings retained the title of Bangladesh Premier League after handing a 2–0 defeat to three-time champions Sheikh Jamal Dhanmondi Club.

=== 2021–22 season ===
On 16 August 2022, Bashundhara Kings clinched their third league title in a row and thus, qualified for the 2023 AFC Champions League Play-off round. They would become the first Bangladeshi club to play in any stage of this tournament since its re-introduction in 2002. Their top goal scorer and highest assist provider that season was Robson Azevedo with 16 goals and 11 assists. Anisur Rahman Zico kept 11 clean sheets which was more than any other goalkeeper during the league season.

=== 2022–23 season ===
On 26 May 2023, Kings became the first team in history to lift four consecutive Bangladesh Premier League titles when they defeated Sheikh Russel KC 6–4 at the Bashundhara Kings Arena. The league's top scorer was King's Dorielton Gomes with 18 Goals and while his teammate Robson Azevedo was the highest assist provider for the second consecutive season by registering 10 assists. Anisur Rahman Zico again finished the season with the most clean sheets.

== Home venue ==
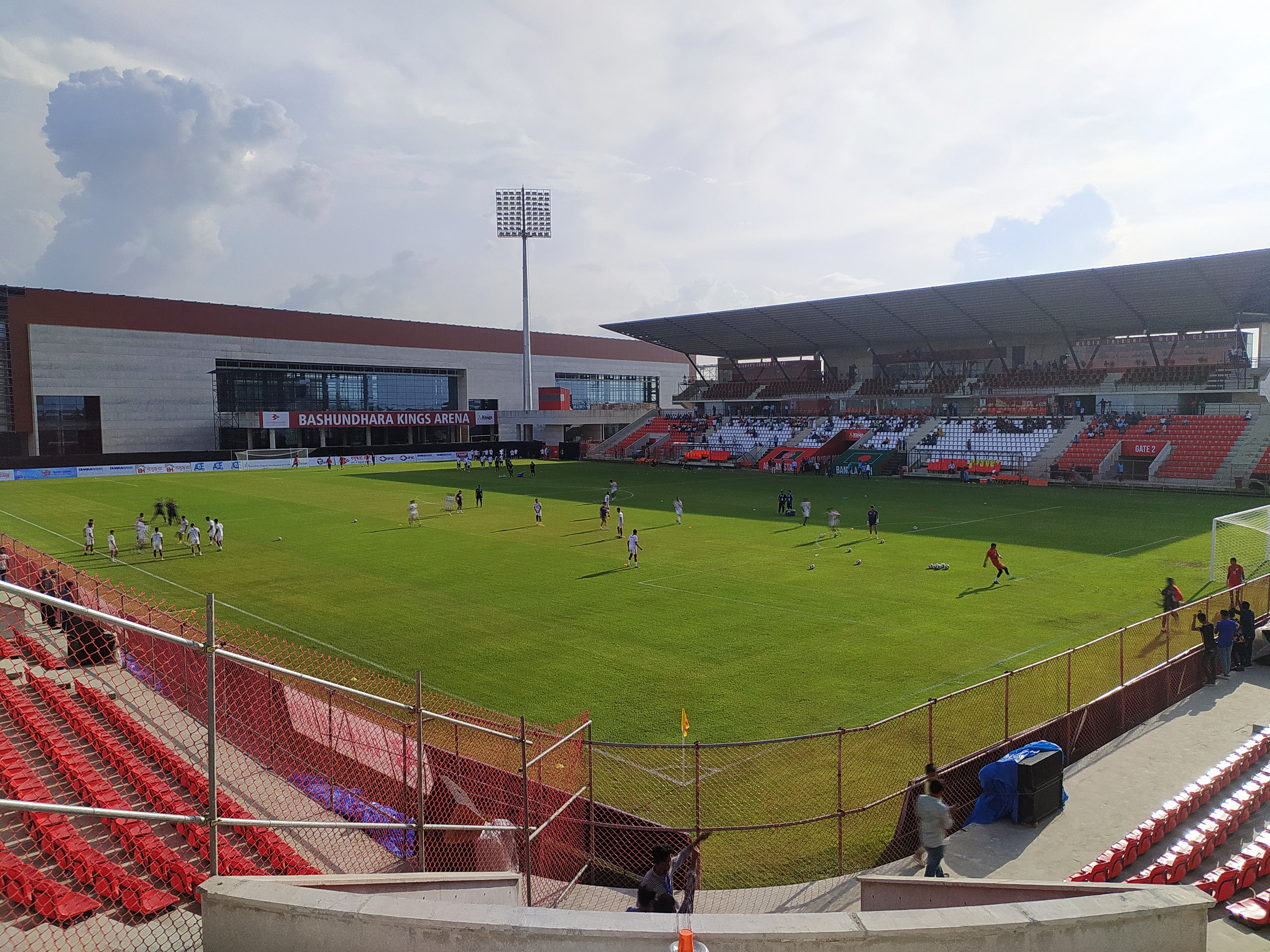
Areal view of Bashundhara Kings Arena during practice session.

From 2018 to 2021, the 20,000-plus-capacity Nilphamari International Stadium was the home ground of Bashundhara Kings. It is situated at Nilphamari District. In 2020, Kings' home venue, Nilphamari International Stadium had taken a brand new look as the whole stadium has dawned Bashundhara Kings themed colors.

=== Bashundhara Kings Arena ===
In 2019, it was confirmed that the Bashundhara Kings Arena will be the next destination for Kings. In the North Zone of the Bashundhara Sports Complex, there will be a football facility with a state-of-the-art natural grass playground of FIFA standard. Complemented with international standard dressing room facilities for both home and away team and match officials, 14,000 capacity gallery, VIP boxes, press conference, press box for proper broadcasting requirements and with broadcast-quality lighting of international standard. From, 2021–22 Bangladesh Premier League, Bashundhara Kings started using Bashundhara Kings Arena as their home venue. On 17 February 2022, Bashundhara Kings played against Bangladesh Police FC, during the first ever match hosted by the Bashundhara Kings Arena, where Bashundhara Kings won 3–0 against Bangladesh Police FC.

== Supporters ==
First ever supporters group or Ultras of Bashundhara Kings is Bashundhara Kings Ultras.

== Shirt sponsors ==
| Period | Shirt sponsor |
|---|---|
| 2017–2023 | Bashundhara Group |
| 2023–present | Pocket |

== International club friendly ==
- On 21 September 2018, Kings played their first-ever home match at Sheikh Kamal Stadium against New Radiant SC in an international friendly match.

| 21 September 2018; International Friendly | Bashundhara Kings | 4–1 | New Radiant | Nilphamari |
| | | | | Stadium: Sheikh Kamal Stadium |

== Current squad ==
As of 11 August 2026

Note: Flags indicate national team as defined under FIFA eligibility rules; some limited exceptions apply. Players may hold more than one non-FIFA nationality.

| No. | Pos. | Nation | Player |
|---|---|---|---|
| 4 | DF | BAN | Topu Barman (Captain) |
| 7 | FW | BAN | Rakib Hossain |
| 8 | MF | BAN | Mohammad Ridoy |
| 10 | MF | BAN | Nabib Newaj Jibon |
| 12 | DF | BAN | Bishwanath Ghosh |
| 14 | MF | BAN | Chandon Roy |
| 17 | MF | BAN | Sohel Rana |
| 27 | GK | BAN | Md Shahin Molla |

| No. | Pos. | Nation | Player |
|---|---|---|---|
| 28 | DF | BAN | Md Yousuf Ali |
| 29 | MF | BAN | Mohsin Ahmed |
| 30 | GK | BAN | Md Mehedi Hasan |
| 32 | DF | BAN | Aksh Ali |
| 42 | MF | BAN | Samuel Raksam |
| 44 | MF | BAN | Md Sabbir Hossen |
| 50 | GK | BAN | Mehedi Hasan Srabon |
| 66 | MF | BAN | U Sing Thowai Marma |
| 77 | FW | BAN | Abu Sufian Yousuf Sifat |

=== Other players under contract ===
As of 13 January 2026

Note: Flags indicate national team as defined under FIFA eligibility rules; some limited exceptions apply. Players may hold more than one non-FIFA nationality.

| No. | Pos. | Nation | Player |

== Current technical staff ==
As of 29 July 2026

| Role | Name |
|---|---|
| Head coach | (Bangladesh) Bayazid Alam Zubair Nipu |
| Assistant coaches | (Bangladesh) Mahabub Hossain Roksy |
| Assistant coaches | (Bangladesh) Syed Golam Jilani |
| Goalkeeping coach | (Bangladesh) Nuruzzaman Nayan |
| Fitness coach | Vacant |
| Head of strategy & planning | Vacant |
| Team manager | (Bangladesh) S.M Wasumuzzaman |
| Physical trainer | Vacant |
| Physio | (Bangladesh) Abu Sufian Sarkar |
| Physio | (Bangladesh) Koushik Roy |
| Media manager | (Bangladesh) Ahmed Shaaek |
| Media manager | (Bangladesh) Md Shihab Rahman |

== Team records ==
=== Overview ===
Record as Professional Football League member
| Season | League | Teams | Position | Federation Cup | Independence Cup | AFC competition | | Top scorers in BCL / BPL | Goals |
|---|---|---|---|---|---|---|---|---|---|
| 2017–18 | BCL | 10 | 1 | — | — | — | — | (Bangladesh) Rokonuzzaman Kanchan | 11 |
| 2018–19 | BPL | 13 | 1 | Runners-up | Champions | — | — | (Brazil) Marcos Vinícius | 14 |
| 2019–20 | BPL | 13 | Cancelled | Champions | — | AFC Cup | Cancelled | (Costa Rica) Daniel Colindres | 4 |
| 2020–21 | BPL | 13 | 1 | Champions | — | AFC Cup | Group stage | (Brazil) Robinho | 21 |
| 2021–22 | BPL | 12 | 1 | Withdrew | Runners-up | AFC Cup | Group stage | (Brazil) Robinho | 16 |
| 2022–23 | BPL | 11 | 1 | Third Place | Champions | — | — | (Brazil) Dorielton | 20 |
| 2023–24 | BPL | 10 | 1 | Champions | Champions | AFC Champions League | Preliminary round | (Brazil) Dorielton | 14 |
| 2023–24 | BPL | 10 | 1 | Champions | Champions | AFC Cup | Group Stage | (Brazil) Dorielton | 14 |

=== Head coaches' records ===
As of 23 May 2026

| Coach | From | To | P | W | D | L | GS | GA | %W |
|---|---|---|---|---|---|---|---|---|---|
| (Bangladesh) S. M. Asifuzzaman | August 2017 | November 2017 | 18 | 10 | 5 | 3 | 23 | 19 | 55.56 |
| (Spain) Óscar Bruzón | 18 September 2018 | 30 May 2024 | 177 | 141 | 18 | 18 | 412 | 143 | 79.66 |
| (Romania) Valeriu Tița | 1 August 2024 | 27 May 2025 | 29 | 15 | 6 | 8 | 62 | 30 | 51.72 |
| (Bangladesh) Mahabub Hossain Roksy | 1 August 2025 | 24 August 2025 | 1 | 1 | 0 | 0 | 1 | 0 | 100.00 |
| (Argentina) Mario Gómez | 24 August 2025 | 31 March 2026 | 17 | 8 | 5 | 4 | 36 | 23 | 47.06 |
| (Bangladesh) Bayazid Alam Zubair Nipu | 1 April 2026 | Present | 11 | 9 | 2 | 0 | 30 | 8 | 81.82 |

P – Total of played matches W – Won matches D – Drawn matches L – Lost matches GS – Goals scored GA – Goals against
%W – Percentage of matches won

=== Continental record ===
| Season | Competition | Round | Club | Home | Away | Top scorers | Goals |
|---|---|---|---|---|---|---|---|
| 2020 | AFC Cup | Group stage | (Maldives) T.C. Sports Club | 5–1 | | (Argentina) Hernan Barcos | 4 |
| 2021 | AFC Cup | Group stage | (Maldives) Maziya | 2–0 | | (Brazil) Robinho (Brazil) Fernandes | 1 |
| 2021 | AFC Cup | Group stage | (India) Bengaluru | 0–0 | | (Brazil) Robinho (Brazil) Fernandes | 1 |
| 2021 | AFC Cup | Group stage | (India) ATK Mohun Bagan | 1–1 | | (Brazil) Robinho (Brazil) Fernandes | 1 |
| 2022 | AFC Cup | Group stage | (Maldives) Maziya | 1–0 | | (The Gambia) Nuha Marong | 2 |
| 2022 | AFC Cup | Group stage | (India) ATK Mohun Bagan | 0–4 | | (The Gambia) Nuha Marong | 2 |
| 2022 | AFC Cup | Group stage | (India) Gokulam Kerala | 2–1 | | (The Gambia) Nuha Marong | 2 |

== Honours ==
| Type | Competitions | Titles | Seasons |
|---|---|---|---|
| Domestic | Bangladesh Premier League/Bangladesh Football League | 6 | 2018–19, 2020–21, 2021–22, 2022–23, 2023–24, 2025–26 |
| Domestic | Bangladesh Championship League | 1 | 2017 |
| Domestic | Federation Cup | 5 | 2019-20, 2020-21, 2023-24,2024-25, 2025-26 |
| Domestic | Independence Cup | 3 | 2018, 2022, 2023 |
| Domestic | Challenge Cup | 2 | 2024, 2025 |

== Performance in AFC competitions ==
- AFC Champions League/Champions League Elite: 1 appearance
  2023–24: Preliminary round
- AFC Cup/Champions League Two: 3 appearances
  2020: Cancelled
  2021: Group stage
  2022: Group stage
  2023–24: Group stage
- AFC Challenge League: 2 appearances
  2024–25: Group stage
  2025–26: Group stage

== Notable players ==
- The foreign players below had senior international cap(s) for their respective countries. Players whose name is listed, represented their countries before or after playing for Bashundhara Kings. The years indicate the time they played for the club.

Asia

- (Kyrgyzstan) Bakhtiyar Duyshobekov (2018–20)
- (Tajikistan) Akhtam Nazarov (2019–20)
- (Lebanon) Jalal Kdouh (2019–20)
- (Iran) Reza Khanzadeh (2022–23)

Africa

- (The Gambia) Nuha Marong (2022)

Europe

- (Bosnia and Herzegovina) Stojan Vranješ (2021–22)

North America

- (Costa Rica) Daniel Colindres (2018–20)
- (Trinidad and Tobago) Willis Plaza (2020)

South America

- (Argentina) Hernán Barcos (2020)

== See also ==
- Bashundhara Kings Women
