= 2022–23 Abahani Limited Dhaka season =

Abahani Ltd. Dhaka 2022–23 football season

Abahani Limited Dhaka
2022–23 season
- Director: Kazi Nabil Ahmed
- Head coach: Mário Lemos
- Stadium: Shaheed Dhirendranath Datta Stadium
- Bangladesh Premier League: 2nd of 11
- Federation Cup: Runner-up
- Independence Cup: Third-place
- Top goalscorer: League: (11 goals) (Costa Rica) Daniel Colindres; All: (16 goals) (Costa Rica) Daniel Colindres
- Biggest win: 7–0 Vs AFC Uttara (24 February 2023)
- Biggest defeat: 2–3 Vs Sheikh Russel KC (30 November 2022)
Home colours	Away colours

The 2022–23 season was the Abahani Limited Dhaka's 15th consecutive season in the Bangladesh Premier League since the initiation of the league, and 48th overall season in the top flight of Bangladeshi football. The season covered a period from 8 October 2022 to 22 July 2023. This season didn't include any AFC competitions as the Asian club competitions switched to two-year (autumn-to-spring) schedule from 2023.

== Players ==
As of 3 November 2022

No.	Player	Nat.	Position(s)	Date Of Birth	Year signed	Previous club
Goalkeepers
1	Shahidul Alam Sohel	(Bangladesh)	GK	12 February 1991 (age 35)	2016	(Bangladesh) Sheikh Jamal DC
18	Mahfuz Hasan Pritom	(Bangladesh)	GK	5 November 1999 (age 27)	2021	(Bangladesh) Muktijoddha SKC
25	Arifuzzaman Himel	(Bangladesh)	GK	10 July 1989 (age 37)	2021	Bangladesh Police FC
30	Shamim Hossen	(Bangladesh)	GK	1 November 1998 (age 28)	2020	Abahani Youth Team
Defenders
2	Sushanto Tripura	(Bangladesh)	RB	5 October 1998 (age 28)	2021	(Bangladesh) Bashundhara Kings
3	Nurul Naium Faisal	(Bangladesh)	LB/CB	11 October 1995 (age 31)	2021	(Bangladesh) Bashundhara Kings
4	Rezaul Karim Reza	(Bangladesh)	CB	1 July 1987 (age 39)	2021	(Bangladesh) Sheikh Jamal DC
5	Riyadul Hasan Rafi	(Bangladesh)	CB	29 December 1999 (age 26)	2022	(Bangladesh) Saif Sporting Club
14	Mamun Miah	(Bangladesh)	RB/CB	11 September 1987 (age 39)	2016	(Bangladesh) Mohammedan SC
15	Alomgir Molla	(Bangladesh)	LB	6 November 2000 (age 26)	2022	(Bangladesh) Mohammedan SC
22	Yousef Mohammad	(Syria)	CB	27 June 1999 (age 27)	2022	(Syria) Al-Jaish SC
24	Assaduzzaman Bablu	(Bangladesh)	CB	1 January 1996 (age 30)	2022	(Bangladesh) Sheikh Russel KC
29	Masud Rana Mredha	(Bangladesh)	RB	19 July 1997 (age 29)	2022	(Bangladesh) Mohammedan SC
33	Shakir Ahmed	(Bangladesh)	RB	4 February 2002 (age 24)	2020	Abahani Youth Team
34	Nazim Uddin	(Bangladesh)	CB	15 February 1994 (age 32)	2019	(Bangladesh) Feni SC
77	Rahmat Mia	(Bangladesh)	LB/RB	8 December 1999 (age 26)	2022	(Bangladesh) Sheikh Russel KC
Midfielders
6	Emon Mahmud Babu	(Bangladesh)	CM/DM	3 June 1991 (age 35)	2021	(Bangladesh) Bashundhara Kings
8	Mohammad Ridoy	(Bangladesh)	DM	1 January 2002 (age 24)	2019	(Bangladesh) Friends Social Organization
13	Papon Singh	(Bangladesh)	DM/CM	31 December 1999 (age 26)	2022	(Bangladesh) Uttar Baridhara
16	Sohel Rana	(Bangladesh)	CM/DM/LW	1 June 1996 (age 30)	2022	(Bangladesh) Chittagong Abahani Limited
17	Mehedi Hasan Royal	(Bangladesh)	AM	1 January 1998 (age 28)	2021	(Bangladesh) Muktijoddha SKC
20	Maraz Hossain Opi	(Bangladesh)	AM/CF	10 March 2001 (age 25)	2022	(Bangladesh) Saif Sporting Club
27	Arafat Tasin	(Bangladesh)	DM	5 January 1991 (age 35)	2019	
28	Tonmoy Das	(Bangladesh)	CM	1 May 1998 (age 28)	2021	Abahani Youth Team
31	Mohammad Al Amin	(Bangladesh)	CM	25 May 1999 (age 27)	2021	(Bangladesh) Saif Sporting Club
35	Al-Amin Hassan Aanaf	(Bangladesh)	CM	24 September 2001 (age 25)	2021	Abahani Youth Team
80	Raphael Augusto (captain)	(Brazil)	CM	6 March 1991 (age 35)	2020	(India) Bengaluru FC
Forwards
7	Jewel Rana	(Bangladesh)	RW	25 December 1995 (age 30)	2018	(Bangladesh) Saif Sporting Club
9	Getterson	(Brazil)	CF	16 May 1991 (age 35)	2021	(Thailand) Chiangrai United
10	Nabib Newaj Jibon	(Bangladesh)	CF/RW	17 August 1990 (age 36)	2021	(Bangladesh) Team BJMC
11	Rahim Uddin	(Bangladesh)	RW/LW	3 June 1999 (age 27)	2022	(Bangladesh) Saif Sporting Club
12	Daniel Colindres	(Costa Rica)	RW	10 January 1985 (age 41)	2021	(Costa Rica) Deportivo Saprissa
19	Foysal Ahmed Fahim	(Bangladesh)	LW/CF	24 February 2002 (age 24)	2022	(Bangladesh) Saif Sporting Club
21	Eleta Kingsley	(Bangladesh)	LW/CF	29 October 1989 (age 37)	2022	(Bangladesh) Bashundhara Kings
23	Peter Nworah	(Nigeria)	CF	15 December 1990 (age 35)	2022	(Qatar) Al-Markhiya SC
26	Emeka Ogbugh	(Nigeria)	FW	22 February 1990 (age 36)	2023	(Bangladesh) Saif Sporting Club

== Transfer ==
=== In ===
No.	Pos	Player	Previous club	Fee	Date	Source
21	FW	(Bangladesh) Eleta Kingsley	(Bangladesh) Bashundhara Kings	Free transfer	28 July 2022	
20	MF	(Bangladesh) Maraz Hossain Opi	(Bangladesh) Saif Sporting Club	Free transfer	6 August 2022	
16	MF	(Bangladesh) Sohel Rana	(Bangladesh) Chittagong Abahani Limited	Free transfer	5 August 2022	
24	DF	(Bangladesh) Asaduzzaman Bablu	(Bangladesh) Sheikh Russel KC	Free transfer	14 August 2022	
19	FW	(Bangladesh) Foysal Ahmed Fahim	(Bangladesh) Saif Sporting Club	Free transfer	8 October 2022	
13	MF	(Bangladesh) Papon Singh	(Bangladesh) Uttar Baridhara Club	Free transfer	26 October 2022	
77	DF	(Bangladesh) Rahmat Mia	(Bangladesh) Sheikh Russel KC	Free transfer	26 October 2022	
5	DF	(Bangladesh) Riyadul Hasan Rafi	(Bangladesh) Saif Sporting Club	Free transfer	26 October 2022	
22	DF	(Syria) Yousef Mohammad	(Syria) Al-Jaish SC	Free transfer	1 November 2022	
15	DF	(Bangladesh) Alomgir Molla	(Bangladesh) Mohammedan SC	Free transfer	9 October 2022	
11	FW	(Bangladesh) Rahim Uddin	(Bangladesh) Saif Sporting Club	Free transfer	9 October 2022	
29	DF	(Bangladesh) Masud Rana Mredha	(Bangladesh) Mohammedan SC	Free transfer	9 October 2022	
9	FW	(Brazil) Getterson	(Thailand) Chiangrai United	Free transfer	9 November 2022	
23	FW	(Nigeria) Peter Nworah	(Qatar) Al-Markhiya SC	Free transfer	8 November 2022	
26	FW	(Nigeria) Emeka Ogbugh	Unattached	Free transfer	17 March 2023	

=== Out ===
No.	Pos	Player	Moved to	Fee	Date	Source
9	FW	(Brazil) Dorielton Gomez Nascimento	(Bangladesh) Bashundhara Kings	Free transfer	7 August 2022	
5	DF	(Bangladesh) Tutul Hossain Badsha	(Bangladesh) Bashundhara Kings	Free transfer	7 August 2022	
11	FW	(Bangladesh) Rakib Hossain	(Bangladesh) Bashundhara Kings	Free transfer	7 August 2022	
20	DF	(Iran) Milad Sheykh Soleimani	(Iran) Shams Azar F.C.	Free transfer	11 September 2022	
19	DF	(Bangladesh) Monir Hossain	(Bangladesh) Sheikh Russel KC	Free transfer	8 October 2022	
13	MF	(Bangladesh) Abu Shaeid	(Bangladesh) Sheikh Jamal DC	Free transfer	15 October 2022	
16	MF	(Bangladesh) Mohamed Sohel Rana	(Bangladesh) Sheikh Russel KC	Free transfer	October 2022	
29	MF	(Bangladesh) Imtiaz Sultan Jitu	Unattached	Released	October 2022	
30	GK	(Bangladesh) Rayhan Ahmed Jaber	Unattached	Released	October 2022	
9	FW	(Brazil) Getterson	Unattached	Released	13 March 2023	

== Competitions ==
Win Draw Loss Fixtures

=== Overall ===
Competition	First match	Last match	Final Position
BPL	9 December 2022	21 July 2023	2nd
Federation Cup	3 January 2023	30 May 2023	Runner-up
Independence Cup	15 November 2022	4 December 2022	Third-place

=== Overview ===
Competition	Record							
Competition	Pld	W	D	L	GF	GA	GD	Win %
BPL	20	12	4	4	46	17	+29	60.00
Independence Cup	6	5	0	1	16	7	+9	83.33
Federation Cup	5	4	0	1	12	7	+5	80.00
Total	31	21	4	6	74	31	+43	67.74

Source: Competitions

=== Premier League ===
Pos	Team	Pld	W	D	L	GF	GA	GD	Pts	Qualification or relegation
1	Bashundhara Kings (C, Q)	20	18	1	1	51	13	+38	55	Qualification for the AFC Challenge League play-off round
2	Dhaka Abahani	20	12	4	4	45	18	+27	40	
3	Bangladesh Police FC	20	10	5	5	39	21	+18	35	
4	Mohammedan SC	20	9	5	6	38	21	+17	32	
5	Sheikh Russel KC	20	8	6	6	33	30	+3	30	

Source: Soccerway
Rules for classification: 1) Points; 2) Goal difference; 3) Goals scored.
(C) Champion; (Q) Qualify for the AFC competition

==== Results summary ====
Overall								Home						Away					
Pld	W	D	L	GF	GA	GD	Pts	W	D	L	GF	GA	GD	W	D	L	GF	GA	GD
20	12	4	4	45	18	+27	40	8	1	1	27	8	+19	4	3	3	18	10	+8

Source: Soccerway

==== Results by round ====
Round	1	2	3	4	5	6	7	8	9	10	11	12	13	14	15	16	17	18	19	20	21	22
Ground	H	A	H	A	H	A	H	A	(Note: No Abahani Limited Dhaka matchday in this round.)	H	A	A	H	A	H	A	H	A	H	(Note: No Abahani Limited Dhaka matchday in this round.)	A	H
Result	D	W	W	D	W	D	W	W	–	L	W	W	W	L	W	L	W	D	W	–	L	W
Position	6	4	2	3	2	2	2	2	2	2	2	2	2	2	2	2	2	2	2	2	2	2

Source: Matches
A = Away; H = Home; W = Win; D = Draw; L = Loss; P = Postponed

=== Matches ===
9 December 2022 1	Abahani Limited Dhaka	1–1	Fortis FC	Comilla
	Sohel (yellow card) 45+3'; Riyadul (yellow card) 73' (goal) 89'	Report	Júnior 36'; Rafiqul Islam (yellow card) 81'	Stadium: Shaheed Dhirendranath Datta Stadium; Referee: Bituraj Barua

24 December 2022 2	Rahmatganj MFS	1–2	Abahani Limited Dhaka	Munshigonj
14:30 BST (UTC+6)	Nayon Mia (yellow card) 8' (yellow-red card) 63'; Fatkhullo (yellow card) 39'; Shokhrukhbek Kholmatov (yellow card) 44'; Michael 59'	Report	Colindres 12'; Sohel (red card) 45'; Maraz 72'	Stadium: Shaheed Bir Sreshtho Flight Lt. Matiur Rahman Stadium; Referee: Bituraj Barua

30 December 2022 3	Abahani Limited Dhaka	3–2	Muktijoddha Sangsad KC	Comilla
14:30 BST (UTC+6)	Colindres 39'; Maraz (yellow card) 55'; Rahmat (yellow card) 77'; Eleta 80'; Jibon 90+3'	Report	Ndikumana 3', 46'; Adeyinka Najeem (yellow card) 82'	Stadium: Shaheed Dhirendranath Datta Stadium; Referee: Mahmud Zamal Farouqee Nahid

7 January 2023 4	Bangladesh Police FC	0–0	Abahani Limited Dhaka	Mymensingh
14:45 BST (UTC+6)	Edward Enrique; Morillo Jimenéz (yellow card) 36'	Report	Sohel (yellow card) 21'	Stadium: Rafiq Uddin Bhuiyan Stadium; Referee: Mohamed Alamgir

13 January 2023 5	Abahani Limited Dhaka	5–1	Chittagong Abahani	Cumilla
14:45 BST (UTC+6)	Kingsley 11', 79'; Alamgir Molla (yellow card) 58'; Royal 72'; Colindres 81'; Jibon 90'	Report	David Ifegwu 32'	Stadium: Shaheed Dhirendranath Datta Stadium; Referee: Md Mizanur Rahman

20 January 2023 6	Sheikh Russel KC	2–2	Abahani Limited Dhaka	Dhaka
15:00 BST (UTC+6)	Mapuku 67'; Mfon 90'	Report	Mehedi (yellow card) 12'; Raphael 59'; Kingsley 84'; Yousef (yellow card) 90+5'; Emon (yellow card) 90+8'	Stadium: Bashundhara Kings Arena; Referee: Md Nasiruddin

27 January 2023 7	Abahani Limited Dhaka	2–0	Mohammedan SC	Comilla
15:00 BST (UTC+6)	Nworah 12'; Mehedi (yellow card) 53'; Alamgir Molla (yellow card) 57'; Colindres 58'	Report		Stadium: Shaheed Dhirendranath Datta Stadium; Referee: Md Alamgir Sarker

4 February 2023 8	Sheikh Jamal DC	1–2	Abahani Limited Dhaka	Gopalganj
15:45 BST (UTC+6)	Otabek Valizonov (yellow card) 29'; Stewart 70' (pen.)	Report	Nworah 10'; Mehedi (yellow card) 28'; Colindres 34' (yellow card) 90+3'; Rahmat (yellow card) 53'; Rezaul (yellow card) 69'	Stadium: Sheikh Fazlul Haque Mani Stadium; Referee: Bitura Barua

17 February 2023 10	Abahani Limited Dhaka	1–2	Bashundhara Kings	Comilla
15:45 BST (UTC+6)	Nworah (yellow card) 12'; Rezaul 37' (yellow card) 59'	Report	Tariq (yellow card) 17'; Figueira 26', 77' (yellow card) 90+3'; Asror Gafurov (yellow card) 73'	Stadium: Shaheed Dhirendranath Datta Stadium; Attendance: 10,501; Referee: Pema Tshewang (Bhutan)

24 February 2023 11	AFC Uttara	0–7	Abahani Limited Dhaka	Mymensingh
15:45 BST (UTC+6)	Rayhan Ahmed (yellow card) 18'	Report	Fahim 35', 57', 79'; Eleta 53', 61', 90+4'; Jibon 64'	Stadium: Rafiq Uddin Bhuiyan Stadium; Referee: Jasim Akther

7 April 2023 12	Fortis FC	0–2	Abahani Limited Dhaka	Rajshahi
15:45 BST (UTC+6)		Report	Colindres 9'; Peter 13'	Stadium: Muktijuddho Sriti Stadium; Referee: Bhubon Mohon Tarafder

14 April 2023 13	Abahani Limited Dhaka	4–0	Rahmatganj MFS	Comilla
15:45 BST (UTC+6)	Colindres 17' (pen.), 79', 90+5'; Mehedi (yellow card) 19'; Peter (yellow card) 45+3'; Jibon 59'	Report		Stadium: Shaheed Dhirendranath Datta Stadium; Referee: Md Alamgir Sarkar

28 April 2023 14	Muktijoddha Sangsad KC	1–0	Abahani Limited Dhaka	Gopalganj
15:45 BST (UTC+6)	Emmanuel 90+8'	Report		Stadium: Sheikh Fazlul Haque Mani Stadium; Referee: Md Jalal Uddin

5 May 2023 15	Abahani Limited Dhaka	4–1	Bangladesh Police FC	Comilla
16:00 BST (UTC+6)	Raphael 36' (pen.); Foysal 54'; Sohel 65'; Emeka 76'	Report	Mohamed Rasel Hossain (yellow card) 23'; Zillur Rahman 40'	Stadium: Shaheed Dhirendranath Datta Stadium; Referee: Md Mizanur Rahman

12 May 2023 16	Chittagong Abahani	3–2	Abahani Limited Dhaka	Munshigonj
16:00 BST (UTC+6)	Ojukwu 7', 40'; Ekbal Hossain 35'; Imran Hassan Remon (yellow card) 85'; Kazi Rahad Mia (yellow card) 89'	Report	Yousef 18', 64'; Papon (yellow card) 52'; Rezaul (yellow card) 69'	Stadium: Shaheed Bir Sreshtho Flight Lt. Matiur Rahman Stadium; Referee: Md Jalal Uddin

19 May 2023 17	Abahani Limited Dhaka	3–1	Sheikh Russel KC	Comilla
16:00 BST (UTC+6)	Colindres 6'; Ogbugh 32', 76'	Report	Dipok Roy 85'	Stadium: Shaheed Dhirendranath Datta Stadium; Referee: Golam Mourshed Chowdhury Nayon

26 May 2023 18	Mohammedan SC	1–1	Abahani Limited Dhaka	Comilla
16:00 BST (UTC+6)	Diabate 45+4' (pen.); Muzaffar Muzaffarov (yellow card) 80'	Report	Peter (yellow card) 80'; Kingsley 83' (pen.)	Stadium: Shaheed Dhirendranath Datta Stadium; Referee: Md Anisur Rahman Sagor

2 June 2023 19	Abahani Limited Dhaka	3–0	Sheikh Jamal DC	Comilla
16:00 BST (UTC+6)	Eleta 23'; Emeka 45+4'; Colindres 48'; Shahidul (yellow card) 63'; Mehedi (yellow card) 87'	Report		Stadium: Shaheed Dhirendranath Datta Stadium; Referee: Bituraj Barua

14 July 2023 21	Bashundhara Kings	1–0	Abahani Limited Dhaka	Dhaka
16:00 BST (UTC+6)	Dorielton 21'; Tripura (yellow card) 33'; Badsha (yellow card) 45+4'; Bishwanath (yellow card) 50'; Rakib (yellow card) 70'	Report	Sohel (yellow card) 27'; Fahim (yellow card) 41'; Colindres (yellow card) 54'	Stadium: Bashundhara Kings Arena; Attendance: 12,125; Referee: Md Alamgir Sarkar

21 July 2023 22	Abahani Limited Dhaka	1–0	AFC Uttara	Comilla
16:00 BST (UTC+6)	Papon (yellow card) 55'; Jibon 70'	Report	Istekharul Alam Shakil (yellow card) 4'; Richard Maturana (yellow card) 35'	Stadium: Shaheed Dhirendranath Datta Stadium; Referee: Sabuj Das

=== Federation Cup ===
==== Group stages ====
Pos	Team	Pld	W	D	L	GF	GA	GD	Pts	Qualification
1	Abahani Limited Dhaka	2	2	0	0	4	3	+1	6	Advance to knockout phase
2	Sheikh Russel KC	2	1	0	1	4	3	+1	3	Advance to knockout phase
3	Bangladesh Police FC	2	0	0	2	0	2	−2	0	

Source: Footystats
Rules for classification: Group stage tiebreakers

3 January 2023	Bangladesh Police FC	0–1	Abahani Limited Dhaka	Munshigonj
14:45 BST (UTC+6)	Mohammed Shamim Ahmed (yellow card) 3'; Almazbek Malikov (yellow card) 27'	Report	Monjurur 41' (o.g.)	Stadium: Shaheed Bir Sreshtho Flight Lt. Matiur Rahman Stadium; Referee: Bhubon Mohon Tarafder

28 February 2023	Abahani Limited Dhaka	3–3 (5–3 p)	Sheikh Russel KC	Gopalganj
15:45 BST (UTC+6)	Mehedi 16'; Eleta 48'; Peter 89'	Report	Monir Hossain (yellow card) 17'; Dipok Roy 67'; Didier 79' (pen.) (yellow card) 80'; Khalekuzzaman Sabuj 84'	Stadium: Sheikh Fazlul Haque Mani Stadium; Referee: Md Nasir Uddin

==== Knockout stage ====
11 April 2023 Quarter-finals	Abahani Limited Dhaka	1–0	Sheikh Jamal DC	Gopalganj
15:15 BST (UTC+6)	Augusto 81'	Report	Kawshik Barua (yellow card) 13'; Sulayman Sillah (yellow card) 39'	Stadium: Sheikh Fazlul Haque Mani Stadium; Referee: Md Nasir Uddin

16 May 2023 Semi-finals	Abahani Limited Dhaka	3–0	Sheikh Russel KC	Cumilla
15:15 BST (UTC+6)	Colindres 37'; Fahim 51', 70'	Report	Brossou (yellow card) 65'; Depok Roy (yellow card) 87'	Stadium: Shaheed Dhirendranath Datta Stadium; Referee: Md Mizanur Rahman

30 May 2023 Final	Mohammedan SC	4–4 (a.e.t.) (4–2 p)	Abahani Limited Dhaka	Cumilla
15:15 BST (UTC+6)	Diabate (yellow card) 18' (goal) 57', 61', 84' (pen.), 105+4'	Report	Fahim 17' (yellow card) 64'; Raphael (yellow card) 38'; Colindres 43'; Emeka 66'; Rahmat 118'	Stadium: Shaheed Dhirendranath Datta Stadium; Referee: Md Alamgir Sarker
	Penalties
	Diabate (penalty scored); Alamgir (penalty scored); Roger (penalty scored); Emon (penalty missed); Kamrul Islam (penalty scored)		Augusto (penalty missed); Emeka (penalty scored); Yousef (penalty scored); Colindres (penalty missed)

=== Independence Cup ===
==== Group C ====
Pos	Team	Pld	W	D	L	GF	GA	GD	Pts	Qualification
1	Abahani Ltd. Dhaka	3	3	0	0	8	2	+6	9	Advance to Knockout stage
2	Muktijoddha SKC	3	2	0	1	9	4	+5	6	Advance to Knockout stage
3	Bangladesh Air Force	3	1	0	2	4	9	−5	3	
4	Uttara FC	3	0	0	3	1	7	−6	0	

Source: GSA

15 November 2022	Abahani Limited Dhaka	2–0	Uttara FC	Munshigonj
14:00 BST (UTC+6)	Getterson 34'; Rakib 42' (o.g.)	Report		Stadium: Munshigonj District Stadium; Referee: Sabuj Das

19 November 2022	Abahani Limited Dhaka	3–1	Bangladesh Air Force	Munshigonj
14:00 BST (UTC+6)	Maraz 18'; Colindres 32'; Getterson 43'	Report	Sumon 11'	Stadium: Munshigonj District Stadium; Referee: Md Nasiruddin

23 November 2022	Muktijoddha Sangsad KC	1–3	Abahani Limited Dhaka	Comilla
13:00 BST (UTC+6)	Emmanuel 51'	Report	Raphael 4', 27'; Getterson 61'	Stadium: Comilla District Stadium; Referee: Golam Mourshed Chowdhury Nayan

==== Knockout stages ====
27 November 2021 Quarter finals	Abahani Limited Dhaka	2–1 (a.e.t.)	Sheikh Jamal DC	Gopalganj
13:00 BST (UTC+6)	Shakil 30' (o.g.); Rahim 99'	Report	Stewart 77'	Stadium: Sheikh Fazlul Haque Mani Stadium; Referee: Md Alamgir Sarker

30 November 2022 Semi finals	Sheikh Russel KC	3–2	Abahani Limited Dhaka	Munshigonj
13:00 BST (UTC+6)	Brossou 31'; Mfon 54'; Timur Talipov 72'	Report	Nworah 64'; Colindres 90+5' (pen.)	Stadium: Munshigonj District Stadium; Referee: Md Mizanur Rahman

4 December 2022 Third-place	Abahani Limited Dhaka	4–1	Bangladesh Police FC	Munshigonj
13:00 BST (UTC+6)	Colindres 4'; Yousef 39'; Emon 76'; Getterson 85'	Report	Rasel 43'	Stadium: Munshigonj District Stadium; Referee: Bituraj Barua

== Statistics ==
=== Goalscorers ===
As of match played till 21 July 2023

Rank	Player	Position	Total	BPL	Independence Cup	Federation Cup
1	(Costa Rica) Daniel Colindres	FW	16	11	3	2
2	(Bangladesh) Eleta Kingsley	FW	10	9	0	1
3	(Bangladesh) Foysal Ahmed Fahim	FW	7	4	0	3
4	(Brazil) Raphael Augusto	MF	5	2	2	1
4	(Nigeria) Peter Nworah	FW	5	3	1	1
4	(Nigeria) Emeka Ogbugh	FW	5	4	0	1
4	(Bangladesh) Nabib Newaj Jibon	MF	5	5	0	0
5	(Brazil) Getterson	FW	4	0	4	0
6	(Bangladesh) Mehedi Hasan Royal	FW	2	1	0	1
6	(Bangladesh) Maraz Hossain	MF	2	1	1	0
6	(Syria) Yousef Mohammad	DF	2	1	1	0
7	(Bangladesh) Sohel Rana	FW	1	1	0	0
7	(Bangladesh) Md Rahim Uddin	FW	1	0	1	0
7	(Bangladesh) Emon Mahmud Babu	MF	1	0	1	0
7	(Bangladesh) Riyadul Hasan Rafi	DF	1	1	0	0
7	(Bangladesh) Rezaul Karim Reza	DF	1	1	0	0
7	(Bangladesh) Rahmat Mia	DF	1	0	0	1
Own goal			3	0	2	1
Total			73	45	16	12

Source: Matches
