= 2023–24 Abahani Limited Dhaka season =

Abahani Ltd. Dhaka 2023–24 football season

Abahani Limited Dhaka
2023–24 season
- Chairman: Salman F Rahman
- Director: Kazi Nabil Ahmed
- Head coach: Mário Lemos (until 13 October 2023); Andrés Cruciani (from 13 October 2023)
- Stadium: Sheikh Fazlul Haque Mani Stadium
- Bangladesh Premier League: Third-place
- Federation Cup: Semi-finals
- Independence Cup: Semi-finals
- AFC Cup: Preliminary round 2
- Top goalscorer: League: Cornelius Stewart (19); All: Cornelius Stewart (26)
- Biggest win: 6–0 v Brothers Union (Neutral); 16 January 2024 (Federation Cup); 7–1 v Brothers Union (Neutral); 17 May 2024 (Premier League)
- Biggest defeat: 0–4 v Bashundhara Kings (Neutral); 15 December 2023 (Independence Cup)
Home colours	Away colours

The 2023–24 season was Abahani Limited Dhaka's 16th consecutive season in the Bangladesh Premier League and 49th overall season in the top flight of Bangladeshi football. In addition to the domestic league, Abahani Ltd. Dhaka will participate in this season's edition of the AFC Cup, Federation Cup and Independence Cup. The season covered the period from 1 August 2023 to 31 May 2024.

== Players ==
As of 24 March 2024.

No.	Player	Nat.	Position(s)	Date of birth	Year signed	Previous club
Goalkeepers
1	Shahidul Alam Sohel	(Bangladesh)	GK	1 May 1992 (aged 31)	2016	Sheikh Jamal DC
18	Sultan Ahmed	(Bangladesh)	GK	14 September 1990 (aged 33)	2024	Bashundhara Kings
22	Pappu Hossain	(Bangladesh)	GK	7 April 1999 (aged 24)	2023	Chittagong Abahani Limited
25	Arifuzzaman Himel	(Bangladesh)	GK	10 July 1989 (aged 34)	2021	Bangladesh Police FC
30	Shamim Hossen	(Bangladesh)	GK	1 November 1998 (aged 24)	2020	Abahani Youth Team
Defenders
2	Aaron Evans	(Australia)	CB	21 November 1994 (aged 28)	2024	(Australia) Dandenong Thunder SC
3	Rahmat Mia (captain)	(Bangladesh)	LB/RB	8 December 1999 (aged 23)	2022	Sheikh Russel KC
4	Rezaul Karim Reza	(Bangladesh)	CB	1 July 1987 (aged 36)	2021	Sheikh Jamal DC
5	Riyadul Hasan Rafi	(Bangladesh)	CB	29 December 1999 (aged 23)	2022	Saif Sporting Club
19	Alomgir Molla	(Bangladesh)	LB	6 November 2000 (aged 22)	2022	Mohammedan SC
23	Milad Sheykh Soleimani	(Iran)	CB/LB	9 February 1992 (aged 31)	2023	(Iran) Naft Masjed Soleyman
24	Assaduzzaman Bablu	(Bangladesh)	CB	1 January 1996 (aged 27)	2022	Sheikh Russel KC
27	Syed Arafat Tasin	(Bangladesh)	CB	5 January 1991 (aged 32)	2018	
29	Masud Rana Mredha	(Bangladesh)	RB	19 July 1997 (aged 26)	2022	Mohammedan SC
31	Rakib Sarkar	(Bangladesh)	RB/RWB	2 December 1999 (aged 23)	2023	AFC Uttara
33	Shakir Ahmed	(Bangladesh)	RB	4 February 2002 (aged 21)	2020	Abahani Youth Team
34	Nazim Uddin	(Bangladesh)	CB	15 February 1994 (aged 29)	2019	Feni SC
Midfielders
6	Jonathan Fernandes	(Brazil)	CM/AM	21 February 1995 (aged 28)	2023	(Brazil) RJ Portuguesa
7	Rabiul Hasan	(Bangladesh)	AM	June 26, 1999 (aged 24)	2023	Bangladesh Police FC
8	Mohammad Ridoy	(Bangladesh)	DM	1 January 2002 (aged 21)	2019	Friends Social Organization
13	Papon Singh	(Bangladesh)	DM/CM	31 December 1999 (aged 23)	2022	Uttar Baridhara
16	Bruninho	(Brazil)	CM	17 May 1997 (aged 26)	2023	(Brazil) Athletic Club
17	Mehedi Hasan Royal	(Bangladesh)	AM	1 January 1996 (aged 27)	2021	Muktijoddha Sangsad
20	Maraz Hossain Opi	(Bangladesh)	AM/CF	10 March 2001 (aged 22)	2022	Saif Sporting Club
21	Enamul Islam Gazi	(Bangladesh)	AM	12 October 2001 (aged 22)	2023	Rahmatganj MFS
66	Jamal Bhuyan	(Bangladesh)	CM	10 September 1990 (aged 33)	2024	(Argentina) Club Sol de Mayo
Forwards
9	Cornelius Stewart	(Saint Vincent and the Grenadines)	CF	7 October 1989 (aged 34)	2023	Sheikh Jamal DC
10	Nabib Newaj Jibon	(Bangladesh)	CF/RW	17 August 1990 (aged 33)	2021	Team BJMC
11	Rahim Uddin	(Bangladesh)	RW/LW	3 June 1999 (aged 24)	2022	Saif Sporting Club
12	Washington Brandão	(Brazil)	CF	18 August 1990 (aged 33)	2023	(Vietnam) Hoang Anh Gia Lai
14	Sakib Bepari	(Bangladesh)	CF	13 January 2003 (aged 20)	2024	AFC Uttara
32	Md Sayed Hossain Sayem	(Bangladesh)	CF/RW/LW	7 February 2002 (aged 21)	2023	Dohazari Abahani Academy
Players on loan
28	Asadul Molla	(Bangladesh)	CF/RW	26 December 2006 (aged 16)	2023	BFF Elite Academy
Left during the season
2	Sushanto Tripura	(Bangladesh)	RB	5 October 1998 (aged 25)	2021	Bashundhara Kings
3	Nurul Naium Faisal	(Bangladesh)	LB/CB	11 October 1995 (aged 28)	2021	Bashundhara Kings
6	Emon Mahmud Babu	(Bangladesh)	CM/DM	3 June 1991 (aged 32)	2021	Bashundhara Kings
7	Jewel Rana	(Bangladesh)	RW	25 December 1995 (aged 27)	2018	Saif Sporting Club
12	Muzaffar Muzaffarov	(Uzbekistan)	CM/CAM	12 April 1995 (aged 28)	2023	Mohammedan SC
14	Mamun Miah	(Bangladesh)	RB/CB	11 September 1987 (aged 36)	2016	Mohammedan SC
18	Mahfuz Hasan Pritom	(Bangladesh)	GK	5 November 1999 (aged 23)	2021	Muktijoddha Sangsad
19	Foysal Ahmed Fahim	(Bangladesh)	LW/CF	24 February 2002 (aged 21)	2022	Saif Sporting Club
21	Eleta Kingsley	(Bangladesh)	LW/CF	29 October 1989 (aged 33)	2022	Bashundhara Kings
22	Yousef Mohammad	(Syria)	CB	27 June 1999 (aged 24)	2022	(Syria) Al-Jaish SC
23	Ojukwu David Ifegwu	(Nigeria)	CF	June 1, 1996 (aged 27)	2023	Chittagong Abahani Limited
26	Emeka Ogbugh	(Nigeria)	CF	22 February 1990 (aged 33)	2023	Saif Sporting Club
28	Tonmoy Das	(Bangladesh)	CM	1 May 1998 (aged 25)	2021	Abahani Youth Team
31	Mohammad Al Amin	(Bangladesh)	CM	25 May 1999 (aged 24)	2021	Saif Sporting Club
32	Danilo Quipapá	(Brazil)	CB	21 February 1994 (aged 29)	2023	Fortis FC
35	Al-Amin Hassan Aanaf	(Bangladesh)	CM	24 September 2001 (aged 22)	2021	Abahani Youth Team
80	Raphael Augusto	(Brazil)	CM	6 March 1991 (aged 32)	2020	(India) Bengaluru FC
–	Jonatan Reis	(Brazil)	CF	30 June 1989 (aged 34)	2023	(Brazil) North Esporte Clube
–	Mostafa Kahraba	(Egypt)	MF	10 November 1987 (aged 35)	2023	Chittagong Abahani Limited

== Friendlies ==
=== Mid-season ===
23 November 2023	Dhaka Abahani	4–0	Sheikh Russel KC	Dhaka
15:00 UTC+6	Rahim; Enamul; Washington	Report		Stadium: Abahani Limited field

== Transfer ==
=== In ===
No.	Pos	Player	Previous club	Fee	Date	Source
	FW	(Brazil) Jonatan Reis	(Brazil) North Esporte Clube	Free	1 September 2023	
23	DF	(Iran) Milad Sheykh	(Iran) Naft Masjed Soleyman	Free	1 September 2023	
21	MF	Enamul Islam Gazi	Rahmatganj MFS	Free	1 September 2023	
9	FW	(Saint Vincent and the Grenadines) Cornelius Stewart	Sheikh Jamal Dhanmondi Club	Free	1 September 2023	
7	MF	Rabiul Hasan	Bangladesh Police FC	Free	1 October 2023	
31	DF	Rakib Sarkar	AFC Uttara	Free	1 October 2023	
22	GK	Pappu Hossain	Chittagong Abahani Limited	Free	1 October 2023	
32	FW	Md Sayed Hossain Sayem	Dohazari Abahani Academy	Free	1 October 2023	
6	MF	(Brazil) Jonathan Fernandes	(Brazil) RJ Portuguesa	Free	16 October 2023	
12	FW	(Brazil) Washington Brandão	(Vietnam) Hoang Anh Gia Lai	Free	18 October 2023	
16	MF	(Brazil) Bruninho	(Brazil) Athletic Club	Free	18 October 2023	
66	MF	Jamal Bhuyan	(Argentina) Club Sol de Mayo	Free	24 March 2024	
2	DF	(Australia) Aaron Evans	(Australia) Club Sol de Mayo	Free	20 April 2024	
18	GK	Sultan Ahmed	Unattached	Free	24 April 2024	
14	FW	Sakib Bepari	AFC Uttara	Free	24 April 2024	

=== Loans in ===
No.	Pos	Player	From	Fee	Date	On loan until	Source
12	MF	(Uzbekistan) Muzaffar Muzaffarov	Mohammedan SC	Free	July 2023	31 August 2023	
32	DF	(Brazil) Danilo Quipapá	Fortis FC	Free	July 2023	31 August 2023	
23	FW	(Nigeria) Ojukwu David Ifegwu	Chittagong Abahani Limited	Free	July 2023	31 August 2023	
	MF	(Egypt) Mostafa Kahraba	Chittagong Abahani Limited	Free	July 2023	31 August 2023	
9	FW	(Saint Vincent and the Grenadines) Cornelius Stewart	Sheikh Jamal Dhanmondi Club	Free	July 2023	31 August 2023	
28	FW	Asadul Molla	BFF Elite Academy	Tk 7.75 lakh	26 August 2023	23 July 2024	

=== Out ===
No.	Pos	Player	Moved to	Fee	Date	Source
12	FW	(Costa Rica) Daniel Colindres	(Costa Rica) A.D. Municipal Liberia	Free transfer	23 July 2023	
23	FW	(Nigeria) Peter Nworah	Unattached	Released	23 July 2023	
16	MF	Mohamed Sohel Rana	Bashundhara Kings	Pre-contract	1 September 2023	
19	FW	Foysal Ahmed Fahim	Sheikh Jamal Dhanmondi Club	Pre-contract	1 September 2023	
6	MF	Emon Mahmud Babu	Sheikh Russel KC	Free transfer	1 September 2023	
	FW	(Brazil) Jonatan Reis	Unattached	Released	1 September 2023	
22	DF	(Syria) Yousef Mohammad	Al-Wahda SC	Free transfer	1 September 2023	
21	FW	Eleta Kingsley	Unattached	Released	1 October 2023	
35	MF	Al-Amin Hassan Aanaf	Unattached	Released	1 October 2023	
31	MF	Mohammad Al Amin	Rahmatganj MFS	Free transfer	1 October 2023	
18	GK	Mahfuz Hasan Pritom	Sheikh Jamal Dhanmondi Club	Free transfer	10 October 2023	
28	MF	Tonmoy Das	Rahmatganj MFS	Free transfer	17 October 2023	
7	FW	Jewel Rana	Rahmatganj MFS	Free transfer	17 October 2023	
2	DF	Sushanto Tripura	Rahmatganj MFS	Free transfer	17 October 2023	
3	DF	Nurul Naium Faisal	Rahmatganj MFS	Free transfer	17 October 2023	
80	MF	(Brazil) Raphael Augusto	Unattached	Released	17 October 2023	
26	FW	(Nigeria) Emeka Ogbugh	Unattached	Released	25 February 2024	
14	DF	Mamun Miah	Retired	N/A	25 February 2024	

== Competitions ==
Win Draw Loss Fixtures

=== Overall ===
Competition	First match	Last match	Final Position
BPL	22 December 2023	29 May 2024	Third-place
Federation Cup	16 January 2024	17 May 2024	Semi-finals
Independence Cup	27 October 2023	15 December 2023	Semi-finals
AFC Cup	15 August 2023	22 August 2023	Play-off round

=== Overall record ===
Competition	First match	Last match	Starting round	Final position	Record							
Competition	First match	Last match	Starting round	Final position	Pld	W	D	L	GF	GA	GD	Win %
Premier League	22 December 2023	29 May 2024	Matchday 1	Third-place	18	9	5	4	34	22	+12	50.00
Federation Cup	16 January 2024	17 May 2024	Group Stage	Semi-finals	5	3	0	2	13	5	+8	60.00
Independence Cup	27 October 2023	15 December 2024	Group Stage	Semi-finals	5	3	1	1	7	5	+2	60.00
AFC Cup	16 August 2023	22 August 2023	Preliminary round 2	Play-off round	2	1	0	1	3	4	−1	50.00
Total					30	16	6	8	57	36	+21	53.33

Source: Soccerway

=== Premier League ===
==== League table ====
Pos	Team	Pld	W	D	L	GF	GA	GD	Pts	Qualification or relegation
1	Bashundhara Kings (C, W, Q)	18	14	3	1	49	13	+36	45	Qualification for the AFC Challenge League group stage and 2024 Bangladesh Challenge Cup
2	Mohammedan SC (Q)	18	9	8	1	40	17	+23	35	Qualification for the 2024 Bangladesh Challenge Cup (Note: being Bashundhara Kings Champions and winners of both league and 2023–24 Federation Cup, Mohammedan SC qualified for 2024 Bangladesh Challenge Cup after being runners-up in both league and cup.)
3	Abahani Ltd. Dhaka	18	9	5	4	34	22	+12	32	
4	Bangladesh Police FC	18	7	5	6	23	19	+4	26	
5	Fortis FC	18	6	6	6	21	23	−2	24	

Source: Soccerway
Rules for classification: 1) Points; 2) Goal difference; 3) Goals scored.
(C) Champion; (Q) Qualify for the phase indicated; (W) Cup Winner

==== Results summary ====
Overall								Home						Away					
Pld	W	D	L	GF	GA	GD	Pts	W	D	L	GF	GA	GD	W	D	L	GF	GA	GD
18	9	5	4	34	22	+12	32	3	4	2	18	12	+6	6	1	2	16	10	+6

Source: Soccerway

==== Results by round ====
Round	1	2	3	4	5	6	7	8	9	10	11	12	13	14	15	16	17	18
Ground	H	A	A	H	H	A	A	H	A	A	H	H	A	A	H	H	A	H
Result	D	L	W	W	L	W	W	D	D	W	D	W	W	L	D	W	W	L
Position	5	8	5	3	4	3	3	3	3	3	3	3	3	3	3	3	3	3

Source: Matches
A = Away; H = Home; W = Win; D = Draw; L = Loss; P = Postponed

=== Matches ===
22 December 2023 1	Dhaka Abahani	1–1	Rahmatganj MFS	Gopalganj
14:30 BST (UTC+6)	Fernandes 21'; Milad Sheykh (yellow card) 52'	Report	Shakil (yellow card) 17'; Ceesay (yellow card) 52'; Boateng 67' (yellow card) 70'; Jewel (yellow card) 78'	Stadium: Sheikh Fazlul Haque Mani Stadium; Referee: Md Alamgir Sarker

30 December 2023 2	Fortis FC	1–0	Dhaka Abahani	Rajshahi
14:30 BST (UTC+6)	Valeriy 37'; Rashedul (yellow card) 67'; Bappy (yellow card) 90+5'	Report		Stadium: Muktijuddho Sriti Stadium; Referee: Bhubon Mohon Tarafder

12 January 2024 3	Sheikh Jamal DC	0–1	Dhaka Abahani	Gopalganj
14:45 BST (UTC+6)	Dipu (yellow card) 34'; Shaymanov (yellow card) 51'; Leite (yellow card) 69'	Report	Rafi (red card) 38'; Cornelius 88'	Stadium: Sheikh Fazlul Haque Mani Stadium; Referee: Md Mizanur Rahman

20 January 2024 4	Dhaka Abahani	3–1	Sheikh Russel KC	Gopalganj
14:45 BST (UTC+6)	Fernandes 12' (yellow card) 61'; Rahmat (yellow card) 78'; Cornelius 45+2', 85'	Report	Shahin (yellow card) 61'; Reza 73'	Stadium: Sheikh Fazlul Haque Mani Stadium; Referee: Mohammed Jalal Uddin

26 January 2024 5	Dhaka Abahani	0–2	Bashundhara Kings	Gopalganj
14:45 BST (UTC+6)	Masud Rana (yellow card) 38'; Royal (yellow card) 74'; Milad Sheykh (yellow card) 85'; Bablu (yellow card) 87'	Report	Sohel (yellow card) 22'; Robinho 26'; Topu (yellow card) 30'; Figueira 72'; Yuldashov (red card) 90+9'	Stadium: Sheikh Fazlul Haque Mani Stadium; Referee: Mohammed Nasiruddin

2 February 2024 6	Bangladesh Police	1–2	Dhaka Abahani	Mymensingh
15:00 BST (UTC+6)	Manas (yellow card) 53'; Ismail (yellow card) 58'; Bablu 65' (o.g.)	Report	Fernandes 12'; Mehedi (yellow card) 30'; Ridoy 51'; Soleimani (yellow card) 87'	Stadium: Rafiq Uddin Bhuiyan Stadium; Referee: Md Mizanur Rahman

9 February 2024 7	Brothers Union	2–3	Dhaka Abahani	Rajshahi
:1500 BST (UTC+6)	Ranu (yellow card) 45'; Insan 59'; Rahul 90+3'; Otabek (yellow card) 64' (red card) 90+5'	Report	Fernandes 7'; Washington 36'; Cornelius 48'; Papon (yellow card) 90+4'	Stadium: Muktijuddho Sriti Stadium; Referee: Sabuj Das

17 February 2024 8	Dhaka Abahani	2–2	Chittagong Abahani	Gopalganj
15:00 BST (UTC+6)	Cornelius 9' (pen.), 36' (yellow card) 90+5'; Rahim (yellow card) 28'; Sohel (yellow card) 45'; Bablu (yellow card) 78'; Ridoy (yellow card) 84'	Report	Muritala (yellow card) 45'; Ifegwu 45+3' (pen.), 54'; Ashraful (yellow card) 90+1'	Stadium: Sheikh Fazlul Haque Mani Stadium; Referee: Jasim Akhter

23 February 2024 9	Mohammedan SC	2–2	Dhaka Abahani	Mymensingh
15:00 BST (UTC+6)	Emmanuel (yellow card) 6'; Manik (yellow card) 78'; Diabate 68' (pen.), 87' (pen.)	Report	Bruninho 2'; Rafi (yellow card) 48'; Cornelius 55'; Ridoy (yellow card) 66'	Stadium: Rafiq Uddin Bhuiyan Stadium; Referee: Symoon Hasan Sany

30 March 2024 10	Rahmatganj MFS	0–3	Dhaka Abahani	Munshigonj
15:15 BST (UTC+6)	Konney (yellow card) 90+3'	Report	Bhuyan (yellow card) 42'; Washington 49'; Cornelius 59'; Fernandes 63'	Stadium: Shaheed Bir Sreshtho Flight Lieutenant Matiur Rahman Stadium; Referee: Bituraj Barua

5 April 2024 11	Dhaka Abahani	1–1	Fortis FC	Gopalganj
15:15 BST (UTC+6)	Cornelius 90+5'; Bruninho (yellow card) 68'	Report	Valeriy 61'	Stadium: Sheikh Fazlul Haque Mani Stadium; Referee: Arisur Rahman Sagor

19 April 2024 12	Dhaka Abahani	2–1	Sheikh Jamal DC	Gopalganj
15:45 BST (UTC+6)	Fernandes 28' (yellow card) 90+5'; Masud Rana (yellow card) 35'; Cornelius 45+1'; Ridoy (yellow card) 72'	Report	Abdullah 8'; Kholmatov (yellow card) 68'; Leite (yellow card) 86'; Taj (yellow card) 89'; Shaymanov (yellow card) 90+3'	Stadium: Sheikh Fazlul Haque Mani Stadium; Referee: Bituraj Barua

26 April 2024 13	Sheikh Russel KC	0–1	Dhaka Abahani	Dhaka
15:45 BST (UTC+6)	Balabanovic (yellow card) 21'; Shahin (yellow card) 30'; Monir (yellow card) 71'	Report	Bruninho 74'	Stadium: Bashundhara Kings Arena; Referee: Sabuj Das

4 May 2024 14	Bashundhara Kings	2–1	Dhaka Abahani	Dhaka
17:45 BST (UTC+6)	Rakib 5'; Figueira 35' (yellow card) 89'; Rimon (yellow card) 61'; Sohel (yellow card) 87'	Report	Milad Sheykh (yellow card) 33'; Cornelius 50'; Papon (yellow card) 54'	Stadium: Bashundhara Kings Arena; Referee: Mohammed Nasiruddin

10 May 2024 15	Dhaka Abahani	1–1	Bangladesh Police	Gopalganj
16:00 BST (UTC+6)	Cornelius 8'; Washington (yellow card) 68'	Report	M S Bablu 87'	Stadium: Sheikh Fazlul Haque Mani Stadium; Referee: Md Jalaluddin

17 May 2024 16	Dhaka Abahani	7–1	Brothers Union	Gopalganj
16:00 BST (UTC+6)	Cornelius 70', 86', 90', 90+4'; Washington 10', 64'; Shakir (yellow card) 59'; Papon (yellow card) 67'; Maraz 90+2'; Jamal (yellow card) 90+3'	Report	Mbye (yellow card) 45+3' (red card) 50'; Mavlyanov 79' (pen.)	Stadium: Sheikh Fazlul Haque Mani Stadium; Referee: Nazmul Huda

25 May 2024 17	Chittagong Abahani	2–3	Dhaka Abahani	Munshigonj
16:00 BST (UTC+6)	Rabby 20'; Semiu (yellow card) 61'; Sagor 67'; Komolafe (yellow card) 79'; Dukhu Mia (yellow card) 84'	Report	Fernandes (yellow card) 49'; Cornelius 80', 90', 90+3' (pen.) (yellow card) 90+4'; Pappu (yellow card) 90+8'	Stadium: Shaheed Bir Sreshtho Flight Lieutenant Matiur Rahman Stadium; Referee: Saymoon Hasan Sany

29 May 2024 18	Dhaka Abahani	1–2	Mohammedan SC	Gopalganj
16:00 BST (UTC+6)	Bruninho 13'; Milad Sheykh (yellow card) 34'; Ridoy (yellow card) 45+4'; Evans (yellow card) 90'	Report	Arif 29', 90' (yellow card) 59'; Sunday (yellow card) 82'	Stadium: Sheikh Fazlul Haque Mani Stadium; Referee: Symoon Hasan Sanny

=== Independence Cup ===
Pos	Team	Pld	W	D	L	GF	GA	GD	Pts	Qualification
1	Abahani Limited Dhaka	3	3	0	0	6	0	+6	9	Advance to Knockout stage
2	Rahmatganj MFS	3	1	1	1	4	3	+1	4	Advance to Knockout stage
3	Sheikh Russel KC	3	1	1	1	1	2	−1	4	
4	Bangladesh Air Force	3	0	0	3	1	7	−6	0	

Source: GSA
Rules for classification: Group stage tiebreakers

27 October 2023 1	Dhaka Abahani	2–0	Bangladesh Air Force	Gopalganj
14:30 BST (UTC+6)	Jibon (pen.), 11'; Rabiul 36'	Report		Stadium: Sheikh Fazlul Haque Mani Stadium; Referee: Md Anisur Rahman Sagor

30 October 2023 2	Rahmatganj MFS	0–2	Dhaka Abahani	Dhaka
18:00 BST (UTC+6)	Emon (yellow card) 50'; Nahian (yellow card) 57'	Report	Cornelius 76'; Fernandes 83'	Stadium: Bashundhara Kings Arena; Referee: Md Saymoon Hasan Sany

2 November 2023 3	Dhaka Abahani	2–0	Sheikh Russel KC	Gopalganj
14:30 BST (UTC+6)	Alomgir (yellow card) 31'; Fernandes 65'; Washington 75'; Papon (yellow card) 89'	Report	Ekbal (yellow card) 47'; Abdulkhakov (yellow card) 59'	Stadium: Sheikh Fazlul Haque Mani Stadium; Referee: Md Alamgir Sarker

==== Knockout stages ====
3 December 2023 Quarter-finals	Dhaka Abahani	1–1 (a.e.t.) (3–2 p)	Sheikh Jamal DC	Dhaka
18:30 BST (UTC+6)	Rafi (yellow card) 24'; Rahim (yellow card) 43'; Milad Sheykh (yellow card) 64'; Masud Rana (yellow card) 107'; Fernandes 94'	Report	Fahad (yellow card) 16'; Fahim (yellow card) 30'; Kholmatov (yellow card) 36'; Leite 107'	Stadium: Bashundhara Kings Arena; Referee: Bituraj Barua
	Penalties
	Fernandes (penalty scored); Emeka (penalty missed); Washington (penalty scored); Rabiul (penalty missed); Milad Sheykh (penalty scored)		Leite (penalty scored); Kholmatov (penalty missed); Shakil (penalty missed); Rajib (penalty scored); Fahim (penalty missed)

15 December 2023 Semi-finals	Bashundhara Kings	4–0	Dhaka Abahani	Dhaka
16:00 BST (UTC+6)	Saad (yellow card) 30'; Rakib (yellow card) 43'; S. Rana 48'; Dorielton 53'; T. Kazi (yellow card) 66'; M. Srabon (yellow card) 71'; Figueira 77'; Robinho 89' (pen.)	Report		Stadium: Bashundhara Kings Arena; Referee: Md Alamgir Sarker

=== Federation Cup ===
Pos	Team	Pld	W	D	L	GF	GA	GD	Pts	Qualification
1	Mohammedan SC	3	3	0	0	6	3	+3	9	Advance to Knockout stage
2	Abahani Limited Dhaka	3	2	0	1	10	2	+8	6	Advance to Knockout stage
3	Chittagong Abahani	3	1	0	2	4	5	−1	3	
4	Brothers Union	3	0	0	3	1	11	−10	0	

Source: Soccerway
Rules for classification: Group stages tiebreakers

16 January 2024 1	Brothers Union	0–6	Dhaka Abahani	Dhaka
14:45 BST (UTC+6)	Otabek (yellow card) 69'; Kahraba (yellow card) 79'	Report	Jibon 17'; Washington 31', 72', 73'; Alomgir (yellow card) 79'; Cornelius 83', 86'	Stadium: Bashundhara Kings Arena; Referee: Sabuj Das

30 January 2024 2	Dhaka Abahani	3–0	Chittagong Abahani	Dhaka
14:45 BST (UTC+6)	Milad Sheykh (yellow card) 40'; Bruninho 43'; Emeka 47'; Washington 83'	Report	Sakib (yellow card) 59'; Remon (yellow card) 89'	Stadium: Bashundhara Kings Arena; Referee: Md Jashim Akther

13 February 2024 3	Dhaka Abahani	1–2	Mohammedan SC	Gopalganj
15:00 BST (UTC+6)	Cornelius 38'; Mridha (yellow card) 75'	Report	Emmanuel 51', 55'	Stadium: Sheikh Fazlul Haque Mani Stadium; Referee: Bituraj Barua

==== Knockout stages ====
30 March 2024 Quarter-final	Fortis FC	1–3	Dhaka Abahani	Dhaka
15:00 BST (UTC+6)	Nujum 90+7'	Report	Cornelius 9'; Washington 45+2'; Fernandes 79'	Stadium: Bashundhara Kings Arena; Referee: Md Mizanur Rahman

14 May 2024 Semi-final	Bashundhara Kings	3–0	Dhaka Abahani	Gopalganj
15:00 BST (UTC+6)	Robinho 21'; Dori 71'; Ibrahim 90+7'	Report		Stadium: Sheikh Fazlul Haque Mani Stadium; Referee: Anisur Rahman Sagor

=== AFC Cup ===
==== Qualifying play-offs ====
===== Preliminary round 2 =====
16 August 2023 Preliminary round 2	Dhaka Abahani (Bangladesh)	2–1	(Maldives) Club Eagles	Sylhet
15:15 BST (UTC+6)	Cornelius 21'; Fahim (yellow card) 61'; Danilo (yellow card) 11' (goal) 89'	Report	Petrunin (yellow card) 52'; Rizuvan 63' (yellow card) 64'	Stadium: Sylhet District Stadium; Attendance: 1,823; Referee: Zainiddinov Sayyodjon (Tajikistan)

===== Play-off =====
22 August 2023 Play-offs	Mohun Bagan SG (India)	3–1	(Bangladesh) Dhaka Abahani	Kolkata
17:30 BST (UTC+6:00)	Cummings 37' (pen.); Bose (yellow card) 52'; Soleimani 58' (o.g.); Sadiku 60'	Report	Cornelius 17'; Bablu (yellow card) 9'; Muzaffarov (yellow card) 25'; Sushanto (yellow card) 36'; Yousef (yellow card) 69'; Soleimani (yellow card) 71'	Stadium: Salt Lake Stadium; Attendance: 10,625; Referee: Bijan Heydari (Iran)

== Statistics ==
=== Squad statistics ===
No.	Pos	Nat	Player	Total		BPL		Federation Cup		Independence Cup		AFC Cup	
No.	Pos	Nat	Player	Apps	Goals	Apps	Goals	Apps	Goals	Apps	Goals	Apps	Goals
1	GK	(Bangladesh)	Shahidul Alam Sohel	19	0	14	0	4	0	0	0	1	0
18	GK	(Bangladesh)	Sultan Ahmed	0	0	0	0	0	0	0	0	0	0
22	GK	(Bangladesh)	Pappu Hossain	11	0	4+1	0	1	0	5	0	0	0
25	GK	(Bangladesh)	Arifuzzaman Himel	0	0	0	0	0	0	0	0	0	0
30	GK	(Bangladesh)	Shamim Hossen	2	0	0+1	0	0	0	0+1	0	0	0
2	DF	(Australia)	Aaron Evans	4	0	4	0	0	0	0	0	0	0
3	DF	(Bangladesh)	Rahmat Mia	20	0	14	0	3+1	0	0	0	2	0
4	DF	(Bangladesh)	Rezaul Karim Reza	10	0	3+3	0	1	0	2+1	0	0	0
5	DF	(Bangladesh)	Riyadul Hasan Rafi	22	0	13	0	4	0	5	0	0	0
15	DF	(Bangladesh)	Alomgir Molla	20	0	10+1	0	4	0	5	0	0	0
23	DF	(Iran)	Milad Sheykh Soleimani	27	0	15	0	5	0	5	0	2	0
24	DF	(Bangladesh)	Assaduzzaman Bablu	16	0	6+3	0	2+2	0	1	0	1+1	0
29	DF	(Bangladesh)	Masud Rana Mredha	14	0	7+1	0	1	0	2+2	0	1	0
31	DF	(Bangladesh)	Rakib Sarkar	0	0	0	0	0	0	0	0	0	0
33	DF	(Bangladesh)	Shakir Ahmed	4	0	0+2	0	0+1	0	0+1	0	0	0
34	DF	(Bangladesh)	Nazim Uddin	0	0	0	0	0	0	0	0	0	0
6	DF	(Brazil)	Jonathan Fernandes	21	10	13	6	4	1	4	3	0	0
7	MF	(Bangladesh)	Rabiul Hasan	21	1	6+7	0	0+3	0	3+2	1	0	0
8	MF	(Bangladesh)	Mohammad Ridoy	27	1	15+1	1	4	0	5	0	2	0
13	MF	(Bangladesh)	Papon Singh	21	0	6+6	0	4+1	0	0+4	0	0	0
16	MF	(Brazil)	Bruno Goncalves Rocha	7	4	6	3	1	1	0	0	0	0
17	MF	(Bangladesh)	Mehedi Hasan Royal	21	0	10+4	0	0+2	0	2+3	0	0	0
20	MF	(Bangladesh)	Maraz Hossain Opi	10	1	2+3	1	3	0	1+1	0	0	0
21	MF	(Bangladesh)	Enamul Islam Gazi	16	0	5+6	0	0+1	0	2+2	0	0	0
27	MF	(Bangladesh)	Syed Arafat Tasin	0	0	0	0	0	0	0	0	0	0
66	MF	(Bangladesh)	Jamal Bhuyan	7	0	4+1	0	1+1	0	0	0	0	0
9	FW	(Saint Vincent and the Grenadines)	Cornelius Stewart	24	26	16	19	4	4	2	1	2	2
10	FW	(Bangladesh)	Nabib Newaj Jibon	21	2	5+8	0	2+3	1	1+2	1	0	0
11	FW	(Bangladesh)	Rahim Uddin	22	0	6+6	0	1+2	0	6	0	0+1	0
12	FW	(Brazil)	Washington Brandão	22	10	14	4	5	5	3	1	0	0
14	FW	(Bangladesh)	Sakib Bepari	0	0	0	0	0	0	0	0	0	0
28	FW	(Bangladesh)	Asadul Molla	5	0	0+1	0	0+2	0	0+2	0	0	0
32	FW	(Bangladesh)	Md Sayed Hossain Sayem	2	0	0+1	0	0+1	0	0	0	0	0
Players who left during the season
18	GK	(Bangladesh)	Mahfuz Hasan Pritom	1	0	0	0	0	0	0	0	1	0
2	DF	(Bangladesh)	Sushanto Tripura	1	0	0	0	0	0	0	0	1	0
3	DF	(Bangladesh)	Nurul Naium Faisal	1	0	0	0	0	0	0	0	0+1	0
22	DF	(Iraq)	Yousef Mohammad	1	0	0	0	0	0	0	0	1	0
32	DF	(Brazil)	Danilo Quipapá	1	1	0	0	0	0	0	0	1	1
6	MF	(Bangladesh)	Emon Mahmud Babu	0	0	0	0	0	0	0	0	0	0
12	MF	(Uzbekistan)	Muzaffar Muzaffarov	2	0	0	0	0	0	0	0	2	0
14	DF	(Bangladesh)	Mamun Miah	0	0	0	0	0	0	0	0	0	0
16	MF	(Bangladesh)	Mohamed Sohel Rana	2	0	0	0	0	0	0	0	0+2	0
28	MF	(Bangladesh)	Tonmoy Das	0	0	0	0	0	0	0	0	0	0
31	MF	(Bangladesh)	Mohammad Al Amin	0	0	0	0	0	0	0	0	0	0
35	MF	(Bangladesh)	Al-Amin Hassan Aanaf	0	0	0	0	0	0	0	0	0	0
89	MF	(Brazil)	Raphael Augusto	0	0	0	0	0	0	0	0	0	0
7	FW	(Bangladesh)	Jewel Rana	0	0	0	0	0	0	0	0	0	0
19	FW	(Bangladesh)	Foysal Ahmed Fahim	2	0	0	0	0	0	0	0	1+1	0
21	FW	(Bangladesh)	Eleta Kingsley	0	0	0	0	0	0	0	0	0	0
23	FW	(Nigeria)	Ojukwu David Ifegwu	2	0	0	0	0	0	0	0	2	0
26	FW	(Nigeria)	Emeka Ogbugh	8	1	3	0	1	1	2	0	2	0

Source: Soccerway

Independence Cup: Rahmat Mia represented his services team, the Bangladesh Navy, in the Independence Cup.

=== Goalscorers ===
Rank	No.	Pos.	Nat.	Player	BPL	Federation Cup	Independence Cup	AFC Cup	Total
1	9	FW	(Saint Vincent and the Grenadines)	Cornelius Stewart	19	4	1	2	26
2	6	MF	(Brazil)	Jonathan Fernandes	6	1	3	0	10
2	12	FW	(Brazil)	Washington Brandão	4	5	1	0	10
4	16	MF	(Brazil)	Bruno Goncalves Rocha	3	1	0	0	4
5	10	FW	(Bangladesh)	Nabib Newaj Jibon	0	1	1	0	2
6	32	DF	(Brazil)	Danilo Quipapá	0	0	0	1	1
6	7	MF	(Bangladesh)	Rabiul Hasan	0	0	1	0	1
6	26	FW	(Nigeria)	Emeka Ogbugh	0	1	0	0	1
6	8	MF	(Bangladesh)	Mohammad Ridoy	1	0	0	0	1
6	20	MF	(Bangladesh)	Maraz Hossain Opi	1	0	0	0	1
Total					34	13	7	3	57

Source: Matches
