= 2021–22 Uttar Baridhara Club season =

Uttar Baridhara Club
2021–22 season
- President: Zakir Hossain Babul
- Head coach: Mohammed Ali Asgar Nasir
- Stadium: Sheikh Fazlul Haque Mani Stadium
- Bangladesh Premier League: 11th of 12 Relegated
- Federation Cup: Did not play
- Independence Cup: Group stages
- Top goalscorer: League: Arif Hossain; Youssouf Mory Bamba (3 goals each); All: Evgeniy Kochnev (3 goals)

The 2021–22 Uttar Baridhara Club's season was the 2nd competitive highest level football season. This season was remarks 27th existence season overall in Bangladesh football. The season cover period were from 1 October 2021 to 31 July 2022.

== Season summary ==
=== October ===
On 18 October forward Sumon Reza left club to the free transfer Bashundhara Kings for 2021–22 season.

=== November ===
On 27 November Uttar Baridhara SC started their new season with defeated 0–1 against Sheikh Russel KC.

On 1 December Uttar Baridhara Club has played second match of their group and ended the match goalless.

=== December ===
On 5 December Uttar Baridhara Club meet against Bangladesh Air Force football club and match ended with a result 1–1. Penalty goal by Uttar Baridhara on 82 Uzbekistan midfielder Evgeniy Kochnov and 49 minutes scored for Bangladesh Air Force Juwel Miah.

On 25 December Uttar Baridhara Club lost 0-3 goals by FIFA Walkover laws against Dhaka Abahani. The match scheduled to play on following date but the clubs withdrawn their name from the tournament. As per FIFA Walkover laws Dhaka Abahani awarded winner of the match.

On 27 December Uttar Baridhara Club lost 0-3 goals by FIFA Walkover laws against Sheikh Russel KC. The match scheduled to play on following date but the clubs withdrawn their name from the tournament. As per FIFA Walkover laws Sheikh Russel KC awarded winner of the match.

=== February ===
On 3 February Uttar Baridhara Club played their away match against Sheikh Jamal DC and lost by 1–2 goals. On 12 minutes Gambian forward Sulayman Sillah and Nigerian forward Matthew Chinedu goals on 45 minutes took the lead before half time. Uttar Baridhara Uzbekistan Midfielder Evgeniy Kochnev penalty goal on 68 minutes ended the match 2–1.

On 7 February Uttar Baridhara Club lost home match by 0–1 against Bashundhara Kings. In the first on 26 minutes a goal by Bosnian forward Stojan Vranješ took the lead Bashundhara Kings till ended of first half. In the second half both team played excellent football but Uttar Baridhara players would not able to score a goal versus Bashundhara Kings. Till the last whistle Bashundhara Kings hold 0–1 the lead and left the field with 3 points.

On 14 February Uttar Baridhara Club drew 0–0 goal against Swadhinata KS at home game. In the first halftime both teams played excellent and competitive football and first halftime finished 0–0 goal. In the second halftime also both teams players has not found net and finished the game 0–0. They left the ground with 1 point.

On 19 February Uttar Baridhara Club won by 2–1 goals in the away game versus Muktijoddha Sangsad KC. In the first half both teams played goalless. In the second half on 58 minutes a goal by Arif Hossain Uttar Baridhara took lead and on 64 minutes a goal by Sujon Biswas made score 2–0 but on 88 minutes Japanese Soma Otani score for Muktijoddha Sangsad KC. Uttar Baridhara Club graved first victory of this season.

On 24 February Uttar Baridhara Club lost by 0–2 goals against Bangladesh Police FC at home match. In the first half both team played competitive football and they have ended first half goalless. In the second half on 73 minutes Md Faisal Ahmed Shitol goal took lead Bangladesh Police FC made score 1–0 and on 88 minutes Amredin Sharifi extended it 2–0 for Police FC and they have finished the game with three points.

=== March ===
On 2 March Uttar Baridhara Club have lost against Rahmatganj MFS by 1–3 goals in the away game. In the first half Ghanaian forward Philip Adjah goal on 32 minutes got lead Rahmatganj MFS but on 41 minutes Uttar Baridhara Club Uzbekistan midfielder Yevgeniy Kochnev goals leveled the score 1–1 after 2 minutes Philip Adjah again score and make score 2–1 before go to halftime break. In the second half on 73 minutes Midfielder Md Enamul Islam goal helped to win the game by 3–1 score.

On 6 March Uttar Baridhara Club have won by 3–2 goals against Sheikh Russel KC at home ground. On 7 minutes Aizar Akmatov and on 11 minutes goals by Esmaël Gonçalves took early 2–0 lead Sheikh Russel KC. On 39 minutes Saiddoston Fozilov and after a minutes goal by Sujon Biswas equalized score 2–2 goals before called for halftime break. In the second half additional time 90+3 minutes Sujon Biswas secured victory for Uttar Baridhara Club by 3–2 goals.

On 12 March Uttar Baridhara Club drew by 0–0 goal against Dhaka Mohammedan at home game. In the first half time and second half time both teams played excellent and competitive football but their players have not found the goal post and end of the game score remains 0–0 both teams share point.

On 17 March Uttar Baridhara Club have lost by 2–4 goals versus Chittagong Abahani in the away game. In the first half on 12 minutes penalty goal by Nigerian forward Peter Ebimobowei took lead Chittagong Abahani and his two more goals on 38 & 41 minutes took lead Chittagong Abahani 3–0 before half time Peter Ebi completed his hat trick. In the second half on 61 minutes Afghan midfielder Omid Popalzay make it 4–0 but after 7 minutes Uzbekistan forward Saiddoston Fozilov score for Uttar Baridhara. In the additional time 90+3 minutes a goal by Uzbekistan midfielder Yevgeniy Kochnev reduced their lost to 4–2.

=== April ===
On 3 April Uttar Baridhara Club lost by 0–3 goals against Saif Sporting Club in the away match. In the first half on 12 minutes Mfon Udoh goal took lead Saif Sporting Club and before last whistle of halftime on 45+1 minutes goal by Asor Gafurov extended it to 2–0. In the second half on 67 Sazzad Hossain Shakil goals made score 3–0 goals. On 87 minutes shown red card Saif Sporting Club Nasirul Islam Nasir and Yassan Kochnov of Uttar Baridhara Club. Both teams rest of the time played with ten men's squad.

On 7 April 2022 Uttar Baridhara Club have lost against Dhaka Abahani by 2–5 goals in the away match. In the very first minutes Daniel Colindres open goal account for Dhaka Abahani and after three minutes second goal for Dhaka Abahani by Nabib Newaj Jibon make it 2–0 but on 14 Minutes Papon Singh score for Uttar Baridhara Club. On 24 minutes Jewel Rana and again Daniel Colindres on 35 minutes converted score to 4–1 until first half break. On 61 minutes Dhaka Abahani Raphael Augusto make score 5–1 but on 68 minutes Uttar Baridhara Club midfielder Arif Hossain founded net they have reduced their defeat to 5–2 goals. In the 90+1 minutes Uttar Baridhara Club goalkeeper Mohammed Azad Hossen showed red card and sent off him.

On 24 April Uttar Baridhara Club have defeated to Sheikh Jamal DC by 0–2 goals at home ground. In the first half on 2 minutes new signed Nigerian forward Chijoke Alaekwe give lead for Sheikh Jamal DC and on 21 minutes Nigerian another forward Musa Najare score on 21 minutes and they have finished half time. In the second half both teams played excellent and defensive football and end of time Sheikh Jamal DC score remains 2–0 goals.

=== May ===
On 8 May Uttar Baridhara Club have won over Swadhinata KS by 2–0 goals in the away game.

On 13 May Uttar Baridhara Club have drew versus Muktijoddha Sangsad KC by 1–1 at home match.

=== June ===
On 22 June Uttar Baridhara Club have lost by 2–3 goals against Bangladesh Police FC in the away game.

On 28 June Uttar Baridhara Club have drawn versus Rahmatganj MFS with score 1–1 goal at home venue.

=== July ===
On 3 July Uttar Baridhara Club got crushed by 3–5 goals against Sheikh Russel KC in the away game.

On 15 July Uttar Baridhara Club lost against Dhaka Mohammedan by 0–3 goals in the away match.

== Current squad ==
Uttar Baridhara SC squad for 2021–22 season.

As of 5 February 2022

Note: Flags indicate national team as defined under FIFA eligibility rules; some limited exceptions apply. Players may hold more than one non-FIFA nationality.

No.	Pos.	Nation	Player
1	GK	BAN	Saiful Islam Khan
2	DF	BAN	Md Sohel Rana
3	DF	BAN	Arif Khan Joy
4	DF	BAN	Asif Hossain Rimon
5	DF	UZB	Saiddoston Fozilov
6	MF	BAN	Sagor Hossain
7	FW	BAN	Sujon Biswas
9	MF	UZB	Evgeniy Kochnev
10	FW	BAN	Samin Yasir Juel
11	MF	BAN	Arif Hossain
12	MF	BAN	Papon Singh
13	MF	BAN	Rakib Sarkar
14	DF	BAN	Arshad Habib Bishal
15	MF	BAN	Maruf Ahamed
16	DF	BAN	Rashed Hossain Biplob
17	MF	BAN	Omar Faruq
18	DF	BAN	Riyaz Choiyal

No.	Pos.	Nation	Player
19	FW	BAN	Ali Akbor
20	DF	BAN	Foayej Ahammed
21	MF	BAN	Rumnon Hossain
22	GK	BAN	Azad Hossain
23	MF	BAN	Asadul Islam Sakib
24	DF	BAN	Uttam Kumar Banik
25	MF	BAN	Mubinur Rashid
27	MF	BAN	Md Mithu
28	DF	BAN	Jubayer Rahman
29	DF	BAN	Abdul Salam Sohel
30	GK	BAN	Shahin Mollah
31	MF	BAN	Md Jewel
33	GK	BAN	Shaharia Rahman Emon
35	GK	BAN	Mamun Alif
44	DF	EGY	Mahmoud Sayed
55	DF	CIV	Youssouf Mory Bamba
99	MF	EGY	Mostafa Kahraba

== Transfer ==
=== In ===
No.	Pos	Player	Previous club	Fee	Date	Source
19	FW	(Nigeria) Nurudeen Babatunde	(Lebanon) Racing Club Beirut	Not disclosed	16 April 2022	

=== Out ===
No.	Pos	Player	Transferred To	Fee	Date	Source
20	FW	(Bangladesh) Sumon Reza	(Bangladesh) Bashundhara Kings	Free transfer	18 October 2021	

== Competitions ==
Win Draw Loss Fixtures

=== Overall ===
Competition	First match	Last match	Final Position
BPL	3 February 2022	31 July 2022	11th of 12
Independence Cup	27 November 2021	5 December 2021	Group stage
Federation Cup	Did not play		None

=== Overview ===
Competition	Record							
Competition	Pld	W	D	L	GF	GA	GD	Win %
BPL	22	3	5	14	24	57	−33	13.64
Independence Cup	3	0	2	1	1	2	−1	0.00
Federation Cup	2	0	0	2	0	6	−6	0.00
Total	27	3	7	17	25	65	−40	11.11

Source: Competitions

=== Independence Cup ===
==== Group B ====
Pos	Team	Pld	W	D	L	GF	GA	GD	Pts	Status
1	Sheikh Russel KC	3	2	1	0	4	1	+3	7	Qualified for Knockout stage
2	Sheikh Jamal DC	3	1	2	0	4	1	+3	5	Qualified for Knockout stage
3	Uttar Baridhara Club	3	0	2	1	1	2	−1	2	
4	Bangladesh Air Force	3	0	1	2	1	6	−5	1	

Source: Global Sports Archive
Rules for classification: Group stage tiebreakers

27 November 2021	Sheikh Russel KC	1–0	Uttar Baridhara Club	Dhaka
15:30	Mannaf 58'	Report		Stadium: BSSS Mostafa Kamal Stadium; Referee: Bituraj Barua

1 December 2021	Uttar Baridhara Club	0–0	Sheikh Jamal DC	Dhaka
18:00		Report		Stadium: BSSS Mostafa Kamal Stadium; Referee: GM Chowdhury Nayon

5 December 2021	Uttar Baridhara Club	1–1	Bangladesh Air Force	Dhaka
16:00	Kochnev 82' (pen.)	Report	Juwel 49'	Stadium: BSSS Mostafa Kamal Stadium; Referee: Md Shorab Hossain

=== Federation Cup ===
==== Group B ====
Pos	Team	Pld	W	D	L	GF	GA	GD	Pts	Status
1	Sheikh Russel KC	2	1	1	0	5	2	+3	4 (Note: As the fair play points of the two teams were equal, the group champion and runners-up were determined through a penalty shootout. Sheikh Russel KC (13–12) Dhaka Abahani.)	Advance to Knockout stage
2	Dhaka Abahani	2	1	1	0	5	2	+3	4	Advance to Knockout stage
3	Uttar Baridhara Club	2	0	0	2	0	6	−6	0	Later withdrew

Source: Soccerway
Rules for classification: Group stage tiebreakers
Notes:

25 December 2022	Dhaka Abahani	3–0; Walkover	Uttar Baridhara Club	Dhaka
18:45 BST (UTC+6)		Report		Stadium: BSSS Mostafa Kamal Stadium; Attendance: Bituraj Borua
Note: Dhaka Abahani were awarded walkover win by 3 goals since Uttar Baridhara Club did not turn up for the match

27 December 2022	Sheikh Russel KC	3–0; Walkover	Uttar Baridhara Club	Dhaka
18:45 BST (UTC+6)		Report		Stadium: BSSS Mostafa Kamal Stadium
Note: Sheikh Russel KC were awarded walkover win by 3 goals since Uttar Baridhara Club did not turn up for the match

=== Premier League ===
==== League table ====
Pos	Team	Pld	W	D	L	GF	GA	GD	Pts	Qualification or relegation
8	Bangladesh Police FC	22	8	6	8	28	32	−4	30	
9	Muktijoddha Sangsad KC	22	5	4	13	27	42	−15	19	
10	Rahmatganj MFS	22	4	6	12	33	46	−13	18	
11	Uttar Baridhara Club (R)	22	3	5	14	24	58	−34	14	Relegation to Bangladesh Championship League
12	Swadhinata KS (R)	22	2	4	16	22	50	−28	10	Relegation to Bangladesh Championship League

Source: Soccerway
Rules for classification: 1) Points; 2) Goal difference; 3) Goals scored.
(R) Relegated

==== Results summary ====
Overall								Home						Away					
Pld	W	D	L	GF	GA	GD	Pts	W	D	L	GF	GA	GD	W	D	L	GF	GA	GD
22	3	5	14	24	58	−34	14	1	5	5	9	23	−14	2	0	9	15	35	−20

Source: Soccerway

==== Results by round ====
Round	1	2	3	4	5	6	7	8	9	10	11	12	13	14	15	16	17	18	19	20	21	22
Ground	A	H	H	A	H	A	H	H	A	A	A	H	A	A	H	A	H	A	A	H	H	H
Result	L	L	D	W	L	L	W	D	L	L	L	L	L	W	D	L	D	L	L	D	L	L
Position	9	10	10	8	10	10	9	8	9	9	10	10	10	9	9	9	9	10	10	11	11	11

Source: Matches
A = Away; H = Home; W = Win; D = Draw; L = Loss; P = Postponed

=== Matches ===
3 February 2022 1	Sheikh Jamal DC	2–1	Uttar Baridhara Club	Munshigonj
15:00 BST (UTC+6)	S. Sillah 12'; R. Hasan (yellow card) 36'; M.Chinedu 45'; O. Valizhonov (yellow card) 45'	Report	Y. Kochnev 68' (pen.); S. Fozilov (yellow card) 88'	Stadium: Munshigonj Stadium; Referee: Bituraj Barua

7 February 2022 2	Uttar Baridhara Club	0–1	Bashundhara Kings	Munshigonj
15:00 BST (UTC+6)	M. Sayed (yellow card) 52'; S. Fozilov (yellow card) 74'	Report	S. Vranješ 26'; B. Ghosh (yellow card) 39'; A. Fahad (yellow card) 45+3'	Stadium: Munshigonj District Stadium; Referee: Golam Mourshed Chowdhury

14 February 2022 3	Uttar Baridhara Club	0–0	Swadhinata KS	Munshigonj
15:00 BST (UTC+6)	Arif (yellow card) 43'; Uttam (yellow card) 82'	Report	Salim (yellow card) 9'; Shakil (yellow card) 36'; Mavlonov (yellow card) 82'	Stadium: Munshigonj District Stadium; Referee: Md Alamgir Sarker

19 February 2022 4	Muktijoddha Sangsad KC	1–2	Uttar Baridhara Club	Gopalganj
15:00 BST (UTC+6)	Otani 87'	Report	Arif 58'; Sujon 64'; Saiful (yellow card) 82'	Stadium: Sheikh Fazlul Haque Mani Stadium; Referee: Sohrab Hossain

24 February 2022 5	Uttar Baridhara Club	0–2	Bangladesh Police FC	Gopalganj
15:00 BST (UTC+6)	Foziliv (yellow card) 18'; Papon (yellow card) 21'	Report	Monaem (yellow card) 20'; Shitol 73'; Rockey (yellow card) 80'; Sharafi (yellow card) 18' (goal) 88'	Stadium: Sheikh Fazlul Haque Mani Stadium; Referee: Mohammed Jalaluddin

2 March 2022 6	Rahmatganj MFS	3–1	Uttar Baridhara Club	Sylhet
15:00 BST (UTC+6)	Adjah 32', 44'; Enamul 73'; Zahirul (red card) 90+3'	Report	Rashid (yellow card) 19'; Kochnev 41'; Saiful (yellow card) 45'; Jewel (yellow card) 45+1'	Stadium: Sylhet District Stadium; Referee: Bituraj Barua

6 March 2022 7	Uttar Baridhara Club	3–2	Sheikh Russel KC	Gopalganj
15:00 BST (UTC+6)	Fozilov 39'; Sujon 40', 90+3'; Rashid (yellow card) 45+1'; Arif (yellow card) 49'; Saful (yellow card) 86'	Report	Akmatov 7' (yellow card) 67'; Esmaël 11'; Amaral (yellow card) 35'; Rahmat (yellow card) 89'	Stadium: Sheikh Fazlul Haque Mani Stadium; Referee: Bituraj Barua

12 March 2022 8	Uttar Baridhara Club	0–0	Dhaka Mohammedan	Gopalganj
15:30 BST (UTC+6)	Fozilov (yellow card) 5'; Papon (yellow card) 15'; Jewel (yellow card) 45+3'; Kochnev (yellow card) 57'	Report	Jasmin (yellow card) 56'	Stadium: Sheikh Fazlul Haque Mani Stadium; Referee: Mahmud Jamal Faruqee Nahid

17 March 2022 9	Chittagong Abahani	4–2	Uttar Baridhara	Cumilla
15:30 BST (UTC+6)	Peter Ebi 12' (pen.), 38', 41'; Shohel (yellow card) 32'; O. Popalzay 61'	Report	Arif Hossain (yellow card) 29'; Mahmoud Sayed (yellow card) 50'; Kahraba (yellow card) 65'; Fozilov 68'; Kochnev 90+3'	Stadium: Comilla Stadium; Referee: Mahmud Zamal Farouqee Nahid

3 April 2022 10	Saif Sporting Club	3–0	Uttar Baridhara Club	Munshigonj
15:30 BST (UTC+6)	Udoh 12' (yellow card) 28'; Gafurov 45+1'; Shakil 65'; Jamal (yellow card) 61'; Nasirul (red card) 87'	Report	Mostafa (yellow card) 52'; Kochnov (red card) 87'	Stadium: Munshigonj District Stadium; Referee: Mohammed Jalaluddin

7 April 2022 11	Dhaka Abahani	5–2	Uttar Baridhara Club	Sylhet
17:30 BST (UTC+6)	Colindres 1', 35'; Jibon 4'; Jewel 24'; Raphael 61' (pen.)	Report	Kahraba (yellow card) 10'; Papon 14' (yellow card) 33'; Biplob (yellow card) 65'; Arif 68'; Azad (red card) 90+1'	Stadium: Sylhet District Stadium; Referee: Alamgir Sarker

24 April 2022 12	Uttar Baridhara Club	0–2	Sheikh Jamal DC	Gopalganj
15:00 BST (UTC+6)		Report	Alaekwe 2'; Najare 21'	Stadium: Sheikh Fazlul Haque Mani Stadium; Referee: Bituraj Barua

28 April 2022 13	Bashundhara Kings	6–0	Uttar Baridhara Club	Dhaka
15:30 BST (UTC+6)	Figueira 26'; Sohel 30'; Marong 38'; Shafiei (yellow card) 45+4'; Bishwanath (yellow card) 58'; Ibrahim (yellow card) 70'; Sabuz 87'; Khokon 90+2' (o.g.); Sumon 90+3'	Report	Jewel (yellow card) 49'; Saiful (yellow card) 86'	Stadium: Bashundhara Kings Arena; Referee: Golam Mourshed Chowdhury Nayon

8 May 2022 14	Swadhinata KS	0–2	Uttar Baridhara Club	Rajshahi
15:45 BST (UTC+6)	Bokor (yellow card) 26'	Report	Kahraba 26', 90+4'; Fozilov (yellow card) 81'	Stadium: Rajshahi District Stadium; Referee: Bhubon Mohon Torafder

13 May 2022 15	Uttar Baridhara Club	1–1	Muktijoddha Sangsad KC	Gopalganj
15:30 BST (UTC+6)	Papon (yellow card) 45+1'; Arif (yellow card) 46'; Youssouf 68'; Fozlilov (yellow card) 85'	Report	Soma 27'; Tariqul (yellow card) 49'	Stadium: Sheikh Fazlul Haque Mani Stadium; Referee: Bituraj Barua

22 June 2022 16	Bangladesh Police FC	3–2	Uttar Baridhara SC	Rajshahi
15:50 BST (UTC+6)	Rockey (yellow card) 8'; Amiruddin 14', 52'; Bablu (yellow card) 36'; Danilo 47'	Report	Youssouf 69'; Kochnev 90+1'	Stadium: Rajshahi District Stadium; Referee: Bhubon Mohon Tarafder

28 June 2022 17	Uttar Baridhara Club	1–1	Rahmatganj MFS	Gopalganj
15:30 BST (UTC+6)	Mostafa (yellow card) 36'; Sujon (yellow card) 63'; Kochnev (yellow card) 65'; Rashed (yellow card) 77'; Youssouf 90+2'	Report	Enamul (yellow card) 36'; Asrorov (yellow card) 39'; Sunday 80'	Stadium: Sheikh Fazlul Haque Mani Stadium; Referee: Bituraj Barua

3 July 2022 18	Sheikh Russel KC	5–3	Uttar Baridhara Club	Dhaka
15:30 BST (UTC+6)	Jewel 8'; Nasir 38' (pen.); Akinade 45+6', 48'; Rabby 52'; Fahim (yellow card) 81'; Khalekuzaman (yellow card) 90+5'	Report	Papon (yellow card) 15'; Samin 39'; Maruf 63'; Sakib 82'	Stadium: Bashundhara Kings Arena; Referee: Md Symoon Hasan

15 July 2022 19	Dhaka Mohammedan	3–0	Uttar Baridhara Club	Comilla
16:00 BST (UTC+6)	Obi Moneke 45+3', 90+2'; Diabate 70'	Report	Papon (yellow card) 12'	Stadium: Comilla Stadium; Referee: Sabuj Das

20 July 2022 20	Uttar Baridhara Club	2–2	Chittagong Abahani	Gopalganj
16:00 BST (UTC+6)	S. Fozilov 50'; Arif Hossain 78'	Report	S. Rony 10'; Arifur 37'	Stadium: Sheikh Fazlul Haque Mani Stadium; Referee: Sabuj Das

26 July 2022 21	Uttar Baridhara Club	0–7	Saif Sporting Club	Gopalganj
16:00 BST (UTC+6)	Sujon (red card) 5'; Papon (yellow card) 29'	Report	Mfon 15'; Maraz 45', 64' (yellow card) 45'; Riyadul (yellow card) 49'; Gafurov 67', 85'; Rahim 71'; Abid 90+2'	Stadium: Sheikh Fazlul Haque Mani Stadium; Referee: Anisur Rahman

31 July 2022 22	Uttar Baridhara Club	2–5	Dhaka Abahani	Gopalganj
16:00 BST (UTC+6)	Maruf 48'; Fozilov 83'; Mostafa (yellow card) 87'	Report	Dori 18', 23', 40', 73'; Karim (yellow card) 50'; Raphael 58'	Stadium: Sheikh Fazlul Haque Mani Stadium; Referee: Bhubon Mohon Tarafder

== Statistics ==
=== Goalscorers ===
As of match played till 31 July 2022

Rank	Player	Position	Total	BPL	Independence Cup	Federation Cup
1	(Ivory Coast) Youssouf Mory Bamba	DF	3	3	0	0
1	(Uzbekistan) Evgeniy Kochnev	MF	3	2	1	0
1	(Bangladesh) Arif Hossain	MF	3	3	0	0
2	(Bangladesh) Maruf Ahamed	MF	2	2	0	0
2	(Egypt) Mostafa Kahraba	MF	2	2	0	0
2	(Uzbekistan) Saiddoston Fozilov	DF	2	2	0	0
3	(Bangladesh) Asadul Islam Sakib	MF	1	1	0	0
3	(Bangladesh) Papon Singh	MF	1	1	0	0
3	(Bangladesh) Sujon Biswas	FW	1	1	0	0
3	(Bangladesh) Samin Yasir Juel	FW	1	1	0	0
Total			19	18	1	0

Source: Matches
