= Papon Singh =

Bangladeshi footballer (born 1999)

Personal information
- Full name: Papon Singh
- Date of birth: 31 December 1999 (age 26)
- Place of birth: Netrokona, Bangladesh
- Height: 1.58 m (5 ft 2 in)
- Position: Centre midfielder

Team information
- Current team: Dhaka Abahani
- Number: 13

Youth career
- 2017: MSPCC City Club
- 2018: Mohammedan SC

Senior career*
Years	Team	Apps	(Gls)
2018–2022	Uttar Baridhara	48	(3)
2022–	Dhaka Abahani	26	(0)

International career^{‡}
2021–2023	Bangladesh U23	3	(0)
2022–	Bangladesh	3	(1)
- * Club domestic league appearances and goals as of 21 July 2023 ‡ National team caps and goals as of 25 January 2025

Papon Singh (Bengali: পাপন সিং; born 31 December 1999) is a Bangladeshi professional footballer who plays as a centre midfielder for Bangladesh Premier League club Abahani Limited Dhaka and the Bangladesh national team.

== Early career ==
In 2017, Papon played for the eventual Pioneer Football League runners-up, MSPCC City Club. The following year, he participated in the BFF U-18 Football Tournament with Mohammedan SC.

== International career ==
On 1 June 2022, Papon made his international debut for Bangladesh during a FIFA Friendly match against Indonesia. He entered the field in the 88th minute, replacing Biplu Ahmed.

== Career statistics ==
=== Club ===
As of 21 July 2023.

Club	Season	League			Domestic Cup (Note: Appearance(s) in Bangladesh Federation Cup)		Other (Note: Appearance(s) in Bangladesh Independence Cup)		Continental		Total	
Club	Season	Division	Apps	Goals	Apps	Goals	Apps	Goals	Apps	Goals	Apps	Goals
Uttar Baridhara	2019–20	Bangladesh Premier League	5	0	3	0	—		—		8	0
Uttar Baridhara	2020–21	Bangladesh Premier League	23	4	4	0	—		—		27	4
Uttar Baridhara	2021–22	Bangladesh Premier League	20	1	0	0	3	0	—		23	1
Uttar Baridhara	Uttar Baridhara total		48	5	7	0	3	0	0	0	58	5
Dhaka Abahani	2022–23	Bangladesh Premier League	10	0	2	0	5	0	—		17	0
Dhaka Abahani	2023–24	Bangladesh Premier League	0	0	0	0	0	0	0	0	0	0
Career total			58	5	9	0	8	0	0	0	75	5

=== International ===
As of 16 November 2024.

Bangladesh
Year	Apps	Goals
2022	2	0
2024	1	1
Total	3	1

Scores and results list Bangladesh's goal tally first.

List of international goals scored by Papon Singh
No.	Date	Venue	Opponent	Score	Result	Competition
1.	16 November 2024	Bashundhara Kings Arena, Dhaka, Bangladesh	Maldives	2–1	2–1	Friendly
