= Assaduzzaman Bablu =

Bangladeshi footballer

Personal information
- Full name: Mohammed Assaduzzaman Bablu
- Date of birth: 1 January 1996 (age 30)
- Place of birth: Comilla, Bangladesh
- Height: 1.80 m (5 ft 11 in)
- Positions: Center-back; right-back

Team information
- Current team: Dhaka Abahani
- Number: 24

Senior career*
Years	Team	Apps	(Gls)
2014–2015	Fakirerpool YMC		(0)
2016	Sheikh Russel KC		(0)
2017–2018	Mohammedan SC	18	(0)
2018–2019	Saif SC	16	(0)
2019–2022	Sheikh Russel KC	36	(0)
2022–	Dhaka Abahani	31	(2)

International career^{‡}
2017	Bangladesh U23	3	(0)
- * Club domestic league appearances and goals as of 27 May 2025 ‡ National team caps and goals as of 2 June 2023

Assaduzzaman Bablu (Bengali: আসাদুজ্জামান বাবলু; born 1 January 1996) is a Bangladeshi professional footballer who plays as a defender for Bangladesh Premier League club Abahani Limited Dhaka.

== Club career ==
=== Fakirerpool YMC ===
In 2014, Bablu joined Fakirerpool Young Men's Club in the Dhaka Senior Division League, after injuries prevented him from playing in the Second Division the previous year. In his debut season, Fakirerpool became league champions and entered professional football, through the Bangladesh Championship League.

=== Sheikh Russel KC ===
In 2016, he joined top-tier club Sheikh Russel KC, spending most of his first season in the Bangladesh Premier League as a substitute.

=== Abahani Limited Dhaka ===
In 2023, he joined Abahani Limited Dhaka and after his move Bablu along with many other players accused Sheikh Russel of not paying their salary dues on time.

== International career ==
In 2017, Australian coach Andrew Ord gave Bablu his first international callup, and played him in two games in the 2018 AFC U-23 Championship qualifiers, in Hebron, Uzbekistan. He also came on as a substitute during a preparation match against Nepal U23, on 11 July 2017.

== Career statistics ==
=== Club ===
As of 22 August 2023.

Appearances and goals by club, season and competition
Club	Season	League			Domestic Cup (Note: Appearance(s) in Bangladesh Federation Cup)		Continental		Total	
Club	Season	Division	Apps	Goals	Apps	Goals	Apps	Goals	Apps	Goals
Mohammedan SC	2017–18	Bangladesh Premier League	18	0	0	0	—		18	0
Saif SC	2018–19	Bangladesh Premier League	16	0	3	0	—		19	0
Sheikh Russel KC	2019–20	Bangladesh Premier League	4	0	3	0	—		7	0
Sheikh Russel KC	2020–21	Bangladesh Premier League	17	0	0	0	—		17	0
Sheikh Russel KC	2021–22	Bangladesh Premier League	15	0	0	0	—		15	0
Sheikh Russel KC	Sheikh Russel KC total		36	0	3	0	0	0	39	0
Dhaka Abahani	2022–23	Bangladesh Premier League	7	0	2	0	—		9	0
Dhaka Abahani	2023–24	Bangladesh Premier League	0	0	0	0	2 (Note: Appearance(s) in AFC Cup)	0	2	0
Career total			77	0	8	0	2	0	87	0

== Honours ==
Fakirerpool YMC

- Dhaka Senior Division League: 2014
