= Mohammad Ridoy =

Bangladeshi footballer

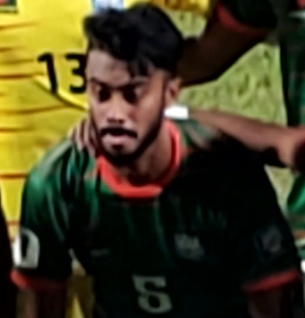
- Ridoy with Bangladesh in 2023

Personal information
- Full name: Mohammad Ridoy
- Date of birth: 1 January 2002 (age 24)
- Place of birth: Narayanganj, Bangladesh
- Height: 1.83 m (6 ft 0 in)
- Positions: Defensive midfielder; center back

Team information
- Current team: Bashundhara Kings
- Number: 8

Youth career
- 2014–2015: Jurain FA

Senior career*
Years	Team	Apps	(Gls)
2015–2016	Rainbow AC		
2016	Purbachal Parishad		
2017	Friends SWO		
2018–2025	Dhaka Abahani	59	(4)
2025–	Bashundhara Kings	13	(1)

International career^{‡}
2015–2018	Bangladesh U16	6	(0)
2019–2021	Bangladesh U19	9	(0)
2021–2022	Bangladesh U23	6	(0)
2021–	Bangladesh	29	(0)
Medal record
Men's football
Representing Bangladesh
SAFF U-16 Championship
Winner	2015 Bangladesh	Team
SAFF U-18 Championship
Runner-up	2019 Nepal	Team
- * Club domestic league appearances and goals as of 1 June 2026 ‡ National team caps and goals as of 11 November 2026

Mohammad Ridoy (Bengali: মোহাম্মদ হৃদয়; born 1 January 2002) is a Bangladeshi professional footballer who plays as a midfielder for Bangladesh Premier League club Bashundhara Kings and the Bangladesh national team.

== Early career ==
Mohammad Ridoy was born on 1 January 2002, in Narayanganj District of Bangladesh. He started his football career in the Narayanganj Rainbow Academy under coach Zakir Hossain. In 2014, he came to Dhaka to participate in the Pioneer Football League with Jurain Football Academy.

== Club career ==
Starting from Rainbow AC in the Third Division League, Ridoy progressed through Purbachal Parishad in the Second Division League, and Friends Social Welfare Organization in the Senior Division League of Dhaka. Eventually, while a first-year Accounting student at Fareast International University, Dhaka, he made his mark in the professional Bangladesh Premier League by joining Abahani Limited Dhaka.

=== Abahani Limited Dhaka ===
Ridoy initially joined Abahani for the 2018 BFF U-18 Football Tournament, but couldn't participate due to prior Senior Division League participation. He eventually secured a permanent deal after the initial trials. On 29 July 2019, Ridoy made his competitive debut for the club as a stoppage time substitute during a 4–1 victory over Sheikh Jamal Dhanmondi Club in the 2018–19 Bangladesh Premier League.

Ridoy's performance against the league champions Bashundhara Kings during the final matchday of the 2020–21 Bangladesh Premier League season on 20 September 2021, impressed BFF president and former national team captain, Kazi Salahuddin. After the game, Salahuddin personally told the national team coaching staff to include Ridoy in the preliminary squad for the 2021 SAFF Championship.

Ridoy suffered a Peroneal nerve injury during the 2021–22 Independence Cup final on 18 December 2021. Sent to Bengaluru for treatment in January 2023, he returned within a month as Indian doctors ruled out the need for surgery. On 19 October 2023, he resumed club practice. On December 24, 2023, after 371 days, Ridoy made a comeback, entering as an 87th-minute substitute in a 2–1 victory over Rahmatganj MFS in the 2022–23 Bangladesh Premier League.

In October 2023, he was appointed club captain for the 2023–24 Independence Cup.

== International career ==
=== Youth ===
Ridoy was part of the Bangladesh U16 team which won the 2015 SAFF U-16 Championship in Sylhet. In the following five years Ridoy took part in the 2016 AFC U-16 Championship qualifiers and the 2020 AFC U-19 Championship qualifiers before making his career breakthrough with Abahani Limited Dhaka in 2021.

On 27 October 2021, After being named on the Bangladesh U23 team by coach Maruful Haque for the AFC U-23 Championship 2022 qualifiers, Ridoy made his debut as the Bangladesh U23 team suffered a 1–0 defeat to Kuwait U23. He went on to play the remaining two games, during a disappointing qualification attempt by the Bangladesh U23 team.

=== Senior ===
On 22 September 2021, Ridoy was called up to national team by interim coach Óscar Bruzón, 6 hours after the original announcement of the squad for the 2021 SAFF Championship. On 10 November 2021, Ridoy made his debut for the Bangladesh national team against Seychelles during the 2021 Four Nations Football Tournament. He went on to play against both Sri Lanka and Maldives in the same competition.

After returning from a long-term injury, Ridoy was included in the national team for the 2023 SAFF Championship, in India. Following his return, Ridoy took the place of Atiqur Rahman Fahad to become the team's main defensive midfielder under Spanish coach Javier Cabrera.

== Career statistics ==
=== Club ===
As of 23 February 2024.

Appearances and goals by club, season and competition
Club	Season	League			Domestic Cup (Note: Appearance(s) in Bangladesh Federation Cup)		Other (Note: Appearance(s) in Bangladesh Independence Cup)		Continental		Total	
Club	Season	Division	Apps	Goals	Apps	Goals	Apps	Goals	Apps	Goals	Apps	Goals
Abahani Limited Dhaka	2018–19	Bangladesh Premier League	1	0	0	0	0	0	0	0	1	0
Abahani Limited Dhaka	2019–20	Bangladesh Premier League	0	0	0	0	—		0	0	0	0
Abahani Limited Dhaka	2020–21	Bangladesh Premier League	14	0	0	0	—		0	0	14	0
Abahani Limited Dhaka	2021–22	Bangladesh Premier League	0	0	0	0	5	0	0	0	5	0
Abahani Limited Dhaka	2022–23	Bangladesh Premier League	12	0	3	0	0	0	—		15	0
Abahani Limited Dhaka	2023–24	Bangladesh Premier League	9	1	2	0	5	0	2 (Note: Appearance(s) in AFC Cup)	0	18	1
Abahani Limited Dhaka	Abahani Limited Dhaka total		36	1	5	0	10	0	2	0	53	1
Career total			36	1	5	0	10	0	2	0	53	1

=== International ===
As of 11 November 2026.

Bangladesh
Year	Apps	Goals
2021	3	0
2023	11	0
2024	8	0
2025	5	0
2026	2	0
Total	29	0

== Honours ==
Abahani Limited Dhaka

- Independence Cup: 2021–22
- Federation Cup: 2021–22

Bangladesh U15

- SAFF U-16 Championship: 2015
