= Alomgir Molla =

Bangladeshi footballer (born 2000)

Personal information
- Full name: Mohammed Alomgir Molla
- Date of birth: 6 November 2000 (age 26)
- Place of birth: Jhenaidah, Bangladesh
- Height: 1.73 m (5 ft 8 in)
- Position: Left-back

Team information
- Current team: Dhaka Abahani
- Number: 16

Senior career*
| Years | Team | Apps | (Gls) |
| 2018–2021 | Muktijoddha Sangsad | 29 | (0) |
| 2021–2022 | Mohammedan | 7 | (0) |
| 2022–2024 | Dhaka Abahani | 25 | (0) |
| 2024–2025 | Brothers Union | 11 | (0) |
| 2025– | Dhaka Abahani | 0 | (0) |

International career^{‡}
| 2023– | Bangladesh | 3 | (0) |
- * Club domestic league appearances and goals as of 23 May 2025 ‡ National team caps and goals as of 28 June 2023

Alomgir Molla (Bengali: আলমগীর মোল্লা; born 6 November 2000) is a Bangladeshi professional footballer who plays as a left-back for Bangladesh Premier League club Abahani Limited Dhaka and the Bangladesh national team.

== International career ==
In March 2023, Alomgir earned his maiden call-up to the Bangladesh national team from head coach Javier Cabrera.

On 28 March 2023, Alomgir made his debut international debut in a 0–1 defeat to Seychelles.

== Career statistics ==
=== Club ===
As of 14 July 2023.

Appearances and goals by club, season and competition
| Club | Season | League | | | Domestic Cup (Note: Appearance(s) in Bangladesh Federation Cup) | | Other (Note: Appearance(s) in Bangladesh Independence Cup) | | Continental | | Total | |
| Club | Season | Division | Apps | Goals | Apps | Goals | Apps | Goals | Apps | Goals | Apps | Goals |
|---|---|---|---|---|---|---|---|---|---|---|---|---|
| Muktijoddha Sangsad | 2018–19 | Bangladesh Premier League | 10 | 0 | 0 | 0 | 2 | 0 | — | | 12 | 0 |
| Muktijoddha Sangsad | 2019–20 | Bangladesh Premier League | 5 | 0 | 0 | 0 | — | | — | | 5 | 0 |
| Muktijoddha Sangsad | 2020–21 | Bangladesh Premier League | 14 | 0 | 2 | 0 | — | | — | | 16 | 0 |
| Muktijoddha Sangsad | Muktijoddha Sangsad total | | 29 | 0 | 2 | 0 | 2 | 0 | 0 | 0 | 33 | 0 |
| Mohammedan | 2021–22 | Bangladesh Premier League | 7 | 0 | 3 | 0 | 3 | 0 | — | | 13 | 0 |
| Dhaka Abahani | 2022–23 | Bangladesh Premier League | 14 | 0 | 4 | 0 | 3 | 0 | 0 | 0 | 21 | 0 |
| Dhaka Abahani | 2023–24 | Bangladesh Premier League | 0 | 0 | 0 | 0 | 0 | 0 | 0 | 0 | 0 | 0 |
| Dhaka Abahani | Abahani Limited Dhaka total | | 14 | 0 | 4 | 0 | 3 | 0 | 0 | 0 | 21 | 0 |
| Career total | | | 49 | 0 | 9 | 0 | 8 | 0 | 0 | 0 | 66 | 0 |

=== International ===
As of 28 June 2023.

Bangladesh national team
| Year | Apps | Goals |
|---|---|---|
| 2023 | 3 | 0 |
| Total | 3 | 0 |

== Personal life ==
Alomgir is a student at Dhaka University's World Religions and Culture department.
