= Rahmat Mia =

Bangladeshi footballer (born 1999)

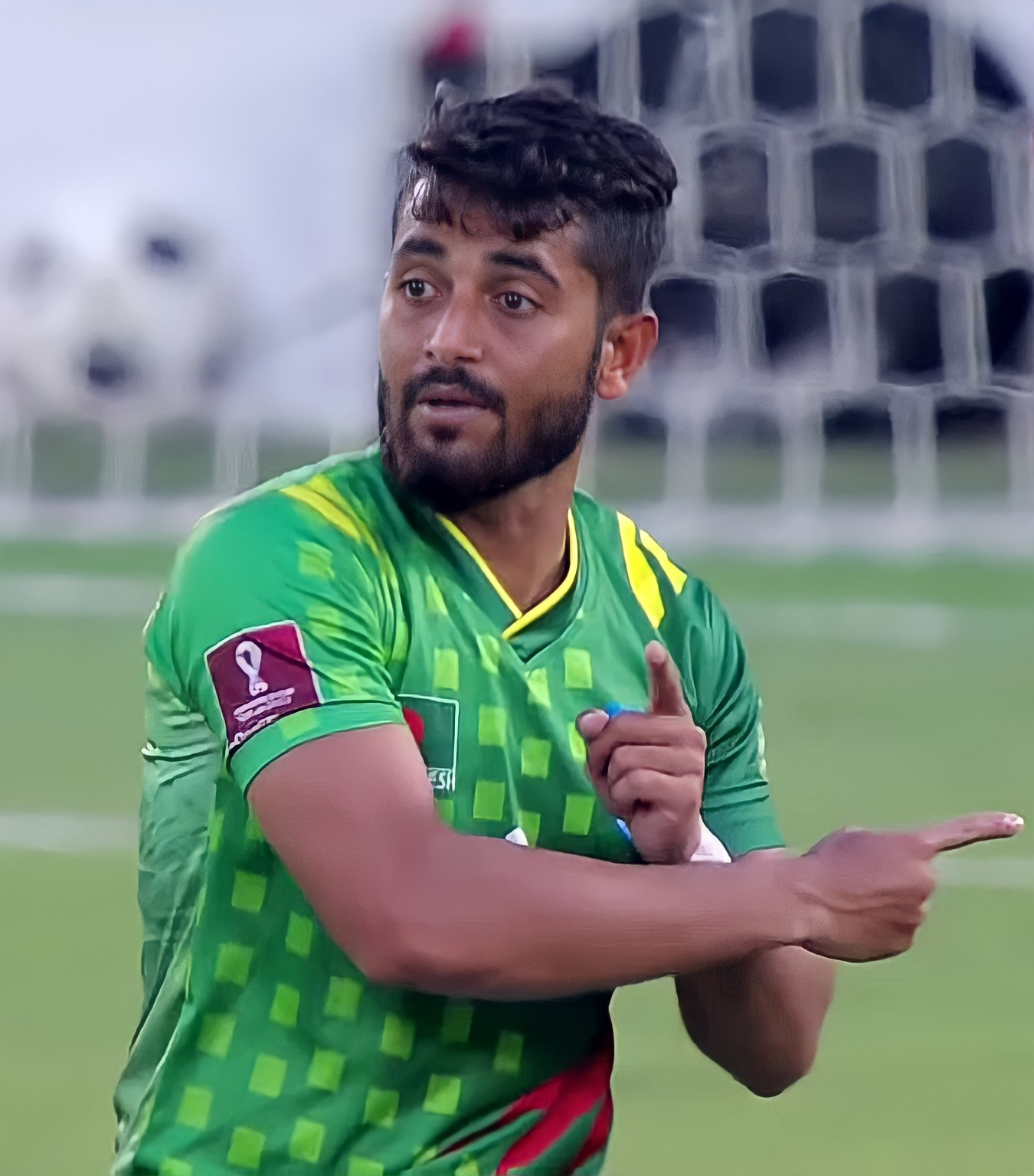
- Rahmat with Bangladesh in 2021

Personal information
- Full name: Mohamed Rahmat Mia
- Date of birth: 8 December 1999 (age 26)
- Place of birth: Magura, Bangladesh
- Height: 1.70 m (5 ft 7 in)
- Position: Full-back

Team information
- Current team: Mohammedan
- Number: 3

Senior career*
Years	Team	Apps	(Gls)
2016–2017	Fakirerpool	13	(1)
2017–2021	Saif	62	(0)
2021–2022	Sheikh Russel	21	(0)
2022–2024	Dhaka Abahani	33	(0)
2024–2025	Brothers Union	17	(1)
2025–	Mohammedan	0	(0)

International career^{‡}
2015–2017	Bangladesh U20	12	(1)
2018–2023	Bangladesh U23	28	(0)
2018–	Bangladesh	42	(0)
Medal record
Representing Bangladesh
SAFF U-18 Championship
Runner-up	2017 Bhutan	Team
South Asian Games
Bronze medal – third place	2019 Nepal	Team
- * Club domestic league appearances and goals as of 22 July 2025 ‡ National team caps and goals as of 11 November 2026

Rahmat Mia (Bengali: রহমত মিয়া; born 8 December 1999) is a Bangladeshi professional footballer who plays as a full-back for Bangladesh Premier League club Mohammedan SC and the Bangladesh national team.

== Club career ==
He started his senior club career by playing for Wari Club in the 2014–15 Bangladesh Championship League. He made his continental debut by playing in the 2018 AFC Cup qualifying play-offs for Saif Sporting Club.

== International career ==
On 27 March 2018, Rahmat made his senior international debut against Laos. He represented the Bangladesh national under-23 team in the 2018 Asian Games. Rahmat was appointed as the captain of the Olympic team for the 2022 Asian Games in Hangzhou, China.

== Career statistics ==
As of 25 May 2024.

Club	Season	League			Cup (Note: Appearance(s) in Bangladesh Federation Cup)		Continental		Other (Note: Appearance(s) in Bangladesh Independence Cup)		Total	
Club	Season	Division	Apps	Goals	Apps	Goals	Apps	Goals	Apps	Goals	Apps	Goals
Fakirerpool	2016	BCL	13	1	—		—		—		13	1
Saif	2017–18	BFL	17	0	2	0	2 (Note: Appearance(s) in AFC Cup)	0	2	0	23	0
Saif	2018–19	BFL	15	0	3	1	—		1	0	19	1
Saif	2019–20	BFL	6	0	3	0	—		—		9	0
Saif	2020–21	BFL	24	0	4	0	—		—		28	0
Saif	Total		62	0	12	1	2	0	3	0	79	1
Sheikh Russel	2021–22	BFL	21	0	2	0	—		0	0	23	0
Dhaka Abahani	2022–23	BFL	19	0	5	1	—		0	0	24	1
Dhaka Abahani	2023–24	BFL	14	0	4	0	2	0	0	0	20	0
Dhaka Abahani	Total		33	0	9	1	2	0	0	0	44	1
Brothers Union	2024–25	BFL	0	0	0	0	—		0	0	0	0
Career total			129	1	23	2	4	0	3	0	159	3

=== Navy ===
As of 31 October 2023.

Appearances and goals by Navy football team, year and competition
Team	Year	Domestic		Contitnental		Total	
Team	Year	Apps	Goals	Apps	Goals	Apps	Goals
Bangladesh Navy	2021–22	3 (Note: Appearance(s) in Bangladesh Independence Cup)	0	0	0	3	0
Bangladesh Navy	2022–23	4 (Note: One appearance in Bangladesh Independence Cup qualifiers, three appearances in Bangladesh Independence Cup)	0	0	0	4	0
Bangladesh Navy	2023–24	3 (Note: One appearance in Bangladesh Independence Cup qualifiers, two appearances in Bangladesh Independence Cup)	0	0	0	3	0
Career total		10	0	0	0	10	0

=== International ===
As of 11 November 2026.

National team	Year	Apps	Goals
Bangladesh	2018	4	0
Bangladesh	2019	8	0
Bangladesh	2020	6	0
Bangladesh	2021	7	0
Bangladesh	2022	4	0
Bangladesh	2023	2	0
Bangladesh	2024	4	0
Bangladesh	2025	2	0
Bangladesh	2026	5	0
Total		42	0

==== International goals ====
===== Youth =====
#	Date	Venue	Opponent	Score	Result	Competition
1	18 September 2017	Changlimithang Stadium, Thimphu	India U18	2–3	4–3	2017 SAFF U-18 Championship

== Honours ==
Fakirerpool YMC

- Bangladesh Championship League: 2016

Saif SC

- Bodousa Cup: 2018
