= Mamun Miah =

Bangladeshi footballer

Mamun Mia
Personal information
- Full name: Mohammad Mamun Miah
- Date of birth: 11 September 1987 (age 39)
- Place of birth: Tangail, Bangladesh
- Height: 1.68 m (5 ft 6 in)
- Positions: Right-back; centre-back

Senior career*
Years	Team	Apps	(Gls)
2003–2007	Fakirerpool YMC		
2007–2009	Farashganj SC		
2009–2010	Mohammedan SC		
2010–2012	Dhaka Abahani		
2012–2016	Mohammedan SC		
2016–2024	Dhaka Abahani	37	(2)

International career^{‡}
2010	Bangladesh U23		
2009–2018	Bangladesh	16	(0)
Medal record
Representing Bangladesh U-23
South Asian Games
Gold medal – first place	2010
- * Club domestic league appearances and goals as of 31 July 2021 ‡ National team caps and goals as of 27 March 2018

Mohammad Mamun Miah (Bengali: মোহাম্মদ মামুন মিয়া; born 11 September 1987) is a former Bangladeshi professional footballer who played as a right-back.

== Early career ==
In 2005, Mamun was adjudged Player of the tournament while representing Stamford University Bangladesh in the Inter-Private University Football Tournament.

== 2018 Federation Cup final incident ==
On 23 November 2018, Abahani Limited Dhaka faced Bashundhara Kings in the 2018 Federation Cup final. In the 94th minute of the game, a fight erupted when Bashundhara's defender Sushanto Tripura punched Abahani striker Nabib Newaj Jibon. This led to Abahani teammate Mamun Mia retaliating by sprinting from his own penalty area and delivering a flying "Kung Fu"-styled kick to Sushanto.

The Bangladesh Football Federation, suspended Shushanto for six games and fined him Tk 100,000, while Mamun was fined a total of Tk 50,000 and had received a one match ban. Eventually, both Mamun and Shushanto had their suspensions reduced. The incident received mass media attention over the next few months.

In 2021, Shushanto, Jibon and Mamun become teammates at Abahani. Later, all three of them stated in an interview that they had made amends.

== Honours ==
Fakirerpool YMC

- Dhaka First Division League: 2003–04

Abahani Limited Dhaka

- Bangladesh Premier League: 2016, 2017–18
- Federation Cup: 2016, 2017, 2018, 2021–22
- Independence Cup: 2021–22

Mohammedan SC

- Federation Cup: 2009
- Independence Cup: 2014
- Super Cup: 2009, 2013

Bangladesh U23

- South Asian Games Gold medal: 2010
