= Nabib Newaj Jibon =

Bangladeshi footballer

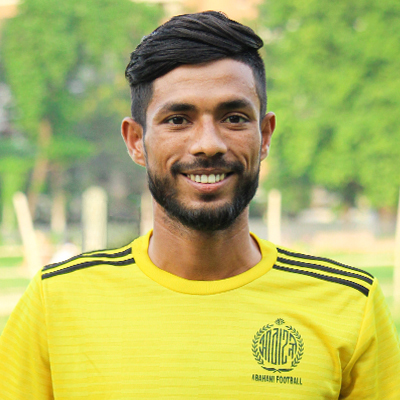
- Jibon with Abahani Limited Dhaka in 2019

Personal information
- Full name: Nabib Newaj Jibon
- Date of birth: 17 August 1990 (age 36)
- Place of birth: Bogura, Bangladesh
- Height: 6 ft 0 in (1.83 m)
- Positions: Striker; attacking midfielder

Team information
- Current team: Bashundhara Kings
- Number: 10

Senior career*
Years	Team	Apps	(Gls)
2010–2013	Uttar Baridhara	23	(16)
2013–2015	Team BJMC	27	(5)
2015	→ Mohammedan (loan)	0	(0)
2016–2024	Dhaka Abahani	108	(37)
2024–2025	Rahmatganj MFS	17	(5)
2025–	Bashundhara Kings	3	(0)

International career^{‡}
2016–2019	Bangladesh U23 (OA)	8	(3)
2015–2022	Bangladesh	32	(5)
Medal record
Representing Bangladesh
South Asian Games
Bronze medal – third place	2016
Bronze medal – third place	2019
- * Club domestic league appearances and goals as of 13 June 2026 ‡ National team caps and goals as of 29 March 2022

Nabib Newaj Jibon (Bengali: নাবিব নেওয়াজ জীবন; born 17 August 1990) is a Bangladeshi professional footballer who plays as a striker for Bangladesh Premier League club Bashundhara Kings.

== Club career ==
=== Early career ===
Jibon's career started in 2006, when he played the JFA Cup U-16 tournament. His performance during the competition earned him a place in the three-month-long Bangladesh U-17 national camp. However, he could not make it to the final squad. In 2007, he made his Pioneer League debut with Noakhali Football Academy and finished the season as top scorer with 11 goals. The following year he played in the Second Division with Ashulia-based Gazir Char Club, but his time there did not go well as the club didn't have enough players to compete for promotion. Jibon then roamed all over the country to display his skills at different district leagues, including Khulna, and also in Chittagong, with Chittagong Mohammedan SC in 2009.

In 2010, Jibon made his First Division debut with Uttar Baridhara Club. In 2012 the Bangladesh Championship League was introduced, as the country's professional second-tier league, and after finishing runners up in the league in 2013, Uttar Baridhara was promoted to the Bangladesh Premier League. Jibon was an integral part of the team, scoring 12 goals in just 13 matches. He attracted the interest of many topflight clubs after that season and ended up joining Team BJMC. On 25 June 2014, he scored his first Premier League goal coming in a 2–2 with Mohammedan SC. During his second year he managed to get 4 goals and 10 assists out of 18 matches. He also spent time on loan at Mohammedan SC in 2015, for the 2015 Sheikh Kamal International Cup, the same year he made his Bangladesh national team debut.

=== Abahani Limited Dhaka ===
On 1 January 2017, Jibon got his big move to Dhaka giants Abahani Limited Dhaka, under coach György Kottán. He won the league title during his second year at the club. His first two seasons at the club, Jibon managed to get limited game time, with foreign strikers occupying the forward line. However, after the appointment of Mário Lemos, during the 2018–19 season, Jibon was converted into a false nine, behind striking duo- Sunday Chizoba and Kervens Belfort. He thrived while playing in the new position, scoring 16 goals and attaining 6 assists during the league season. His best performance that season came against Rahmatganj MFS, when he managed to score a hat-trick. The 2019 AFC Cup saw Abahani become the first Bangladeshi club to reach the knockouts of the competition. Jibon scored twice during the group stages, and his goal against Minerva Punjab also earned him AFC recognition. During the knockout match against North Korean side April 25 SC, Jibon also found the net as Abahani won the game 4–3.

== International career ==
On 13 October 2015, Jibon made his senior debut against Kyrgyzstan during the 2018 FIFA World Cup qualifiers. On 8 January 2018, he scored his first international goal against Sri Lanka during the 2016 Bangabandhu Cup.

== Personal life ==
Jibon was born in Shibganj Upazila of Bogra District. His grandfather, Aftab Hossain Mondal, was a footballer who played for both Mohun Bagan and Kalighat Milan Sangha in the Calcutta Football League during the British regime. His uncle Shahinur Kabir Shimul represented the Bangladesh national football team during the 1986 Asian Games. In 2021, Jibon was stranded in India after undergoing surgery on his right knee during the COVID-19 pandemic. He was able to return to Bangladesh with the help of India national football team player Pritam Kotal and his wife, Sonel Paul.

== Career statistics ==
=== Club ===
As of 29 May 2024

Club	Season	League			Cup (Note: Appearance(s) in Bangladesh Federation Cup)		Other (Note: Appearance(s) in Bangladesh Independence Cup)		Continental		Total	
Club	Season	Division	Apps	Goals	Apps	Goals	Apps	Goals	Apps	Goals	Apps	Goals
Uttar Baridhara	2012	Bangladesh Championship League	11	4	—		—		—		11	4
Uttar Baridhara	2013	Bangladesh Championship League	12	13	—		—		—		12	13
Uttar Baridhara	Uttar Baridhara total		23	17	0	0	0	0	0	0	23	17
Team BJMC	2013–14	Bangladesh Premier League	9	1	0	0	0	0	—		9	1
Team BJMC	2014–15	Bangladesh Premier League	18	4	2	0	—		—		20	4
Team BJMC	Team BJMC total		27	5	2	9	0	0	0	0	29	5
Dhaka Abahani	2016	Bangladesh Premier League	13	5	5	0	0	0	5 (Note: Appearance(s) in AFC Cup)	0	23	5
Dhaka Abahani	2017–18	Bangladesh Premier League	21	4	5	2	3	1	6	0	35	7
Dhaka Abahani	2018–19	Bangladesh Premier League	24	16	4	0	0	0	8	3	36	19
Dhaka Abahani	2019–20	Bangladesh Premier League	6	2	3	2	—		2	0	11	4
Dhaka Abahani	2020–21	Bangladesh Premier League	1	0	4	0	—		—		5	0
Dhaka Abahani	2021–22	Bangladesh Premier League	17	5	4	2	5	2	1	0	27	9
Dhaka Abahani	2022–23	Bangladesh Premier League	13	5	3	0	3	0	—		19	5
Dhaka Abahani	2023–24	Bangladesh Premier League	13	0	5	1	3	1	0	0	21	2
Dhaka Abahani	Dhaka Abahani total		108	37	33	7	14	4	22	3	177	51
Rahmatganj MFS	2024–25	Bangladesh Premier League	0	0	0	0	—		—		0	0
Career total			158	59	35	7	14	4	22	3	229	73

=== International ===
As of 9 March 2022

Bangladesh National Team
Year	Apps	Goals
2015	5	0
2016	8	2
2017	0	0
2018	5	0
2019	9	2
2020	3	1
2022	2	0
Total	32	5

=== International goals ===
==== Olympic Team ====
#	Date	Venue	Opponent	Score	Result	Competition
1.	9 February 2016	SAI Centre, Paltan Bazaar	Bhutan U23	1–1	1–1	2016 South Asian Games
2.	11 February 2016	SAI Centre, Paltan Bazaar	Nepal U23	2–1	2–1	2016 South Asian Games
3.	15 February 2016	Indira Gandhi Athletic Stadium, Sarusajai	Maldives U23	1–0	2(5)–(4)2	2016 South Asian Games

==== National team ====
Scores and results list Bangladesh's goal tally first.

No.	Date	Venue	Opponent	Score	Result	Competition
1.	8 January 2016	Shamsul Huda Stadium, Jessore	Sri Lanka	3–1	4–2	2016 Bangabandhu Cup
2.	18 March 2016	Zayed Sports City Stadium, Abu Dhabi	United Arab Emirates	1–1	1–6	Friendly
3.	29 September 2019	Bangabandhu National Stadium, Dhaka	Bhutan	1–0	4–1	Friendly
4.	29 September 2019	Bangabandhu National Stadium, Dhaka	Bhutan	2–0	4–1	Friendly
5.	13 November 2020	Bangabandhu National Stadium, Dhaka	Nepal	1–0	2–0	Friendly

== Honours ==
Abahani Limited Dhaka

- Bangladesh Premier League: 2016, 2017–18
- Federation Cup: 2016, 2017, 2018, 2021
- Independence Cup: 2021

Bangladesh U23

- South Asian Games bronze medal: 2016, 2019
