= Peter Nworah =

Nigerian footballer

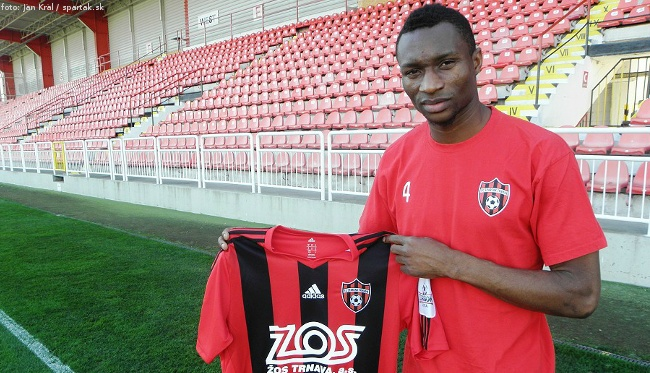

Personal information
- Full name: Peter Nworah
- Date of birth: 15 December 1990 (age 35)
- Place of birth: Lagos, Nigeria
- Height: 1.90 m (6 ft 3 in)
- Position: Forward

Team information
- Current team: Abu Salem SC

Youth career
- Westerlo

Senior career*
Years	Team	Apps	(Gls)
2010–2013	Atlético Baleares	64	(7)
2013	Tatran Prešov	14	(4)
2013	→ Partizán Bardejov (loan)	12	(2)
2013–2014	Spartak Trnava	9	(0)
2014–2015	ŽP Šport Podbrezová	31	(3)
2015	Zemplín Michalovce	14	(0)
2016	Hradec Králové	4	(0)
2016–2017	Frýdek-Místek	4	(0)
2017–2018	Hapoel Kfar Saba	12	(5)
2018–2019	Al-Jabalain	33	(8)
2019–2020	Al-Ain	23	(8)
2020–2021	Hajer	32	(7)
2021–2022	Al-Markhiya	0	(0)
2022	Al-Faisaly SC		
2022-2023	Abahani Limited Dhaka	17	(3)
2023-	Abu Salem SC		

International career
- Nigeria U17
- Nigeria U20
- * Club domestic league appearances and goals as of 1 August 2023

Peter Nworah (born 15 December 1990) is a Nigerian professional footballer who plays as a forward for Abu Salem SC.

He was signed by Spartak Trnava in October 2013 and made his debut for them against Ružomberok on 2 November 2013. In August 2017, he moved to Hapoel Kfar Saba on a two-year contract deal. In 2022-23 season, he played for Bangladesh Premier League club Abahani Limited Dhaka.
