= Nurul Naium Faisal =

Bangladeshi footballer

Personal information
- Full name: Nurul Naium Faisal
- Date of birth: 11 October 1995 (age 31)
- Place of birth: Chittagong, Bangladesh
- Height: 1.79 m (5 ft 10 1/2 in)
- Positions: Left-back; center-back

Senior career*
Years	Team	Apps	(Gls)
2010–2012	Chittagong Abahani		
2012–2013	Victoria SC		
2013–2016	Mohammedan SC		(0)
2016–2018	Chittagong Abahani	38	(0)
2018	→ Saif SC (loan)	0	(0)
2018–2021	Bashundhara Kings	19	(0)
2021–2023	Dhaka Abahani	20	(1)
2023–2024	Rahmatganj MFS	0	(0)
2024–2025	Chittagong Abahani	0	(0)

International career^{‡}
2013	Bangladesh U19	2	(0)
2015–2017	Bangladesh U23	5	(0)
- * Club domestic league appearances and goals as of 25 July 2022 ‡ National team caps and goals as of 2 June 2023

Nurul Naium Faisal (Bengali: নুরুল নাঈম ফয়সাল; born 11 October 1995) is a Bangladeshi professional footballer who plays as a defender. He last played for Bangladesh Premier League club Chittagong Abahani.

== Club career ==
=== Chittagong Abahani ===
Faisal started his career with his hometown club Chittagong Abahani Limited in 2010.

=== Mohammedan SC ===
He moved to Mohammedan SC in 2013 and won the Super Cup in his first year with the Black and Whites.

=== Chittagong Abahani ===
In 2016, Faisal returned to Chittagong Abahani, spending his second stint at the club as their first choice left-back.

=== Bashundhara Kings ===
In 2018, Faisal joined newly promoted, Bashundhara Kings, and went on to win the league title during both the 2018–19 and 2020–21 seasons.

=== Dhaka Abahani ===
In 2021, he joined Abahani Limited Dhaka and continued his record of winning titles by playing an integral role in the clubs domestic cup triumphs. On 28 June 2022, he scored the winning goal during a 3–2 victory over his former club, Chittagong Abahai in a league fixture.

== International career ==
=== Youth ===
Faisal made his debut for the Bangladesh U19 team during the 2014 AFC U-19 Championship qualifiers. In 2015, he was called up to the Bangladesh U23 for the 2016 AFC U-23 Championship qualifiers. He returned to the olympic team on 11 July 2017, during a friendly against Nepal U23. Faisal was later included in the team for the 2018 AFC U-23 Championship qualifiers.

=== Senior ===
In 2018, Faisal was called up to the Bangladesh national team conditioning camp held in Qatar for the then upcoming 2018 SAFF Championship. Upon reaching Qatar, Faisal was greeted by his father, Noor Nabi Chowdhury, who had been stationed in Qatar for work purposes. In 2019, he was again called up to the senior national team and this time it was for the 2022 FIFA World Cup qualification – AFC second round.

== Honours ==
Mohammedan SC

- Super Cup: 2013
- Independence Cup: 2014

Chittagong Abahani Limited

- Independence Cup: 2016

Bashundhara Kings

- Bangladesh Premier League: 2018–19, 2020–21
- Federation Cup: 2019, 2020
- Independence Cup: 2018

Abahani Limited Dhaka

- Federation Cup: 2021
- Independence Cup: 2021
