= Shahidul Alam Sohel =

Bangladeshi footballer (born 1992)

Sahidul Alam Sohel
Personal information
- Full name: Mohammed Shahidul Yousuf Alam Sohel
- Date of birth: 1 May 1992 (age 34)
- Place of birth: Chittagong, Bangladesh
- Height: 1.91 m (6 ft 3 in)
- Position: Goalkeeper

Senior career*
Years	Team	Apps	(Gls)
2007–2008	Badda Jagoroni		(0)
2008–2014	Dhaka Abahani		(0)
2014–2016	Sheikh Jamal DC		(0)
2016–2024	Dhaka Abahani	144	(0)
2024–2025	Rahmatganj MFS	4	(0)
2025–2026	Dhaka Abahani	0	(0)

International career
2009	Bangladesh U19	5	(0)
2012	Bangladesh U23	4	(0)
2011–2023	Bangladesh	26	(0)
- * Club domestic league appearances and goals

Mohammed Shahidul Alam (Bengali: শহিদুল আলম সোহেল; born 1 May 1992), known by his nickname Sohel, is a former Bangladeshi professional footballer who played as a goalkeeper. He last played for Bangladesh Football League club Abahani Limited Dhaka.

== Club career ==
In 2007, Sohel began his career at Badda Jagoroni Sangsad in the Senior Division League in Dhaka. The following year, he joined Abahani Limited Dhaka in the Bangladesh Premier League as the understudy to the veteran first-choice, Biplob Bhattacharjee. Sohel made his breakthrough during the 2011 Super Cup, replacing the injured Ziaur Rahman in the tournament's semi-final against Muktijoddha Sangsad KC, which Abahani won 5–4 on penalties. In the final against arch-rivals, Mohammedan SC, Sohel repeated his heroics and cemented his place in the team as he guided Abahani to a 3–2 victory in tiebreakers. His first league triumph as a starter came in 2012.

== International career ==
Sohel represented the Bangladesh U19 team at the 2010 AFC U-19 Championship qualifiers in Bangkok, Thailand. He made his debut for the U23 team during the 2013 AFC U-22 Championship qualifiers in Nepal. On 2 December 2011, Sohel made his senior national team debut against Pakistan during a goalless draw in the 2011 SAFF Championship. Sohel made a critical error while judging a long-distance free-kick from Bimal Gharti Magar to concede the first goal as Bangladesh lost the group deciding match against Nepal during the 2018 SAFF Championship, 2–0. He was heavily criticized by both fans and local media as his blunder cost Bangladesh a place in the semi-finals. Sohel was later excluded from the squad for the 2018 Bangabandhu Cup, held in the same month.

== Personal life ==
Shahidul Alam Sohel was born on 1 May 1992, in Chittagong, Bangladesh. His father, Yusuf Bulli, was also a footballer and represented the Bangladesh national team during the 1978 Asian Games.

== Career statistics ==
=== International ===
As of 5 September 2021.

Bangladesh
Year	Apps	Goals
2011	3	0
2012	1	0
2013	3	0
2014	1	2
2015	9	0
2016	2	0
2018	4	3
2019	1	0
2021	2	0
Total	26	0

== Honours ==
Abahani Limited Dhaka

- Bangladesh Premier League: 2008–09, 2009–10, 2012, 2016, 2017–18
- Federation Cup: 2010, 2016, 2017, 2018, 2021–22
- Independence Cup: 2021–22
- Super Cup: 2011
- Bordoloi Trophy: 2010

Individual

- 2017 – Bangladesh Premier League Best XI.
