= Mehedi Hasan Royal =

Bangladeshi footballer

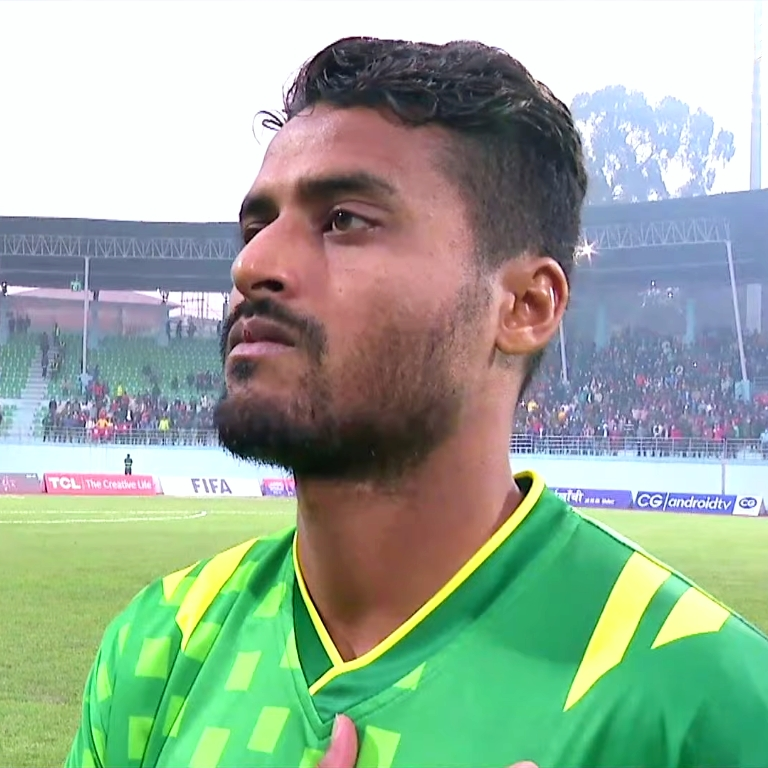
- Royal with Bangladesh in 2021

Personal information
- Full name: Mohamed Mehedi Hasan Royal
- Date of birth: 1 January 1996 (age 30)
- Place of birth: Magura Sadar, Bangladesh
- Height: 1.78 m (5 ft 10 in)
- Position: Forward

Team information
- Current team: Rahmatganj MFS
- Number: 17

Youth career
- —2013: Shams Ul Huda FA

Senior career*
| Years | Team | Apps | (Gls) |
| 2013 | Dipali JS | | |
| 2014–2015 | Team BJMC | | |
| 2017 | Badda Jagoroni | | |
| 2017–2018 | Team BJMC | 14 | (0) |
| 2019–2021 | Muktijoddha Sangsad | 41 | (5) |
| 2021–2024 | Dhaka Abahani | 46 | (3) |
| 2024– | Rahmatganj MFS | 11 | (1) |

International career^{‡}
| 2015 | Bangladesh U19 | 1 | (0) |
| 2021– | Bangladesh | 5 | (0) |
- * Club domestic league appearances and goals as of 27 May 2025 ‡ National team caps and goals as of 15 June 2021

Mehedi Hasan Royal (Bengali: মেহেদি হাসান রয়েল) is a Bangladeshi professional footballer who plays as a forward for Bangladesh Premier League club Rahmatganj MFS and the Bangladesh national team.

== Personal life ==
Royal born in Mohammadpur Upazila in Magura District. He passed Dakhil exam from Mohammadpur Baraktia S.A Dakhil Madrasah and HSC from Aminur Rahman Degree College. He is a student of the law department of Islamic University, Bangladesh in Kushtia.

== International career ==
He made his senior international debut against Nepal at the 2021 Three Nations Cup on 27 March 2021.

== Honours ==
Abahani Limited Dhaka

- Bangladesh Premier League runner-up: 2021–22, 2022–23
- Federation Cup: 2021–22; runner-up: 2022–23
- Independence Cup: 2021–22; third-place: 2022–23
