= Rezaul Karim Reza =

Bangladeshi footballer

Rezaul Karim
Personal information
- Full name: Rezaul Karim Reza
- Date of birth: 1 July 1987 (age 39)
- Place of birth: Chandpur, Bangladesh
- Height: 1.75 m (5 ft 9 in)
- Position: Centre back

Senior career*
Years	Team	Apps	(Gls)
2006–2009	Fakirerpool YMC		
2009–2010	Farashganj SC		
2010–2011	Sheikh Jamal DC		
2011–2012	Muktijoddha Sangsad		
2012–2016	Sheikh Russel KC		
2016–2017	Chittagong Abahani		
2017–2018	Mohammedan SC	5	(0)
2018–2019	Bashundhara Kings	12	(0)
2019–2021	Sheikh Jamal DC	19	(1)
2021–2024	Dhaka Abahani	35	(1)

International career^{‡}
2010–2011	Bangladesh U23		
2010–2021	Bangladesh	19	(1)
Medal record
Representing Bangladesh U-23
South Asian Games
Gold medal – first place	2010
- * Club domestic league appearances and goals as of 29 May 2024 ‡ National team caps and goals as of 13 October 2021

Rezaul Karim Reza (Bengali: রেজাউল করিম রেজা; born 1 July 1987) is a retired Bangladeshi professional footballer who played as a centre-back. He represented the Bangladesh national team between 2010 and 2021. Due to his versatility, he could also play as a left-back. He last played for Dhaka Abahani.

In July 2016, he was appointed as the national team's captain. He led Bangladesh during a friendly against UAE and also during the 2018 FIFA World Cup qualification – AFC second round fixture against Jordan.

== Honours ==
Fakirerpool YMC

- Dhaka Senior Division League: 2007–08

Bangladesh U-23

- South Asian Games Gold medal: 2010

Sheikh Jamal Dhanmondi Club

- Bangladesh Premier League: 2010–11
- Federation Cup: 2011–12
- Pokhara Cup: 2011

Sheikh Russel KC

- Bangladesh Premier League: 2012–13
- Federation Cup: 2012
- Independence Cup: 2012–13

Chittagong Abahani Limited

- Independence Cup: 2016

Bashundhara Kings

- Bangladesh Premier League: 2018–19
- Independence Cup: 2018

Abahani Limited Dhaka

- Independence Cup: 2021
- Federation Cup: 2021
