= Yousef Mohammad (footballer, born 1999) =

Syrian footballer (born 1999)

Personal information
- Full name: Yousef Mohammad
- Date of birth: 26 June 1999 (age 27)
- Place of birth: Al-Hasakah, Syria
- Height: 1.80 m (5 ft 11 in)
- Positions: Centre-back; defensive midfielder

Team information
- Current team: Al-Ramtha

Senior career*
Years	Team	Apps	(Gls)
2017–2021	Al-Wahda		(0)
2021–2022	Al-Ahli Manama		
2022	Al-Jaish		
2022–2023	Abahani Limited Dhaka	20	(2)
2023–2024	Al-Wahda	20	(2)
2024	Al-Karamah		
2024–	Al-Ramtha		

International career^{‡}
2017	Syria U19	3	(0)
2019–	Syria U23	13	(1)
2020–	Syria	10	(0)
- * Club domestic league appearances and goals as of 14 September 2023 ‡ National team caps and goals as of 6 December 2021

Yousef Mohammad (Arabic: يوسف محمد; born 26 June 1999) is a Syrian professional footballer who plays as a centre-back or a defensive midfielder for Jordanian Pro League club Al-Ramtha and the Syria national team.

== Club career ==
In summer 2021, Mohammad moved to Bahraini Premier League side Al-Ahli Manama.

== Honours ==
Abahani Limited Dhaka

- Bangladesh Premier League runner-up: 2022–23
- Federation Cup runner-up: 2022–23
- Independence Cup third-place: 2022–23
