= Jewel Rana =

Bangladeshi footballer

Personal information
- Full name: Mohammad Jewel Rana
- Date of birth: 25 December 1995 (age 30)
- Place of birth: Jhenaidah, Bangladesh
- Height: 1.70 m (5 ft 7 in)
- Position: Right winger

Senior career*
Years	Team	Apps	(Gls)
2013–2014	Brothers Union	11	(1)
2014–2015	Mohammedan	18	(7)
2016–2017	Dhaka Abahani	?	(4)
2017–2018	Saif	21	(5)
2018–2023	Dhaka Abahani	60	(20)
2023–2024	Rahmatganj	9	(0)
2024–2025	Mohammedan	0	(0)
2025	Brothers Union	3	(1)

International career
2014–2018	Bangladesh U23	4	(0)
2015–2022	Bangladesh	27	(1)
- * Club domestic league appearances and goals

Jewel Rana (Bengali: জুয়েল রানা; born 25 December 1995) is a retired Bangladeshi professional footballer who played as a right winger. He last played for Bangladesh Football League club Brothers Union and also represented the Bangladesh national team from 2015 to 2022.

== Club career ==
=== Brothers Union ===
Rana started his professional career in 2013 when he signed a contract with Brothers Union. He came into the limelight in the 2013 Super Cup when he scored three goals and became joint top scorer with Sheikh Russel KC's Jahid Hasan Ameli and Dhaka Mohammedan's Wahed Ahmed. He received The Rising Star award there.

=== Mohammedan SC ===
At the end of the 2013–14 season, he earned a contract from Dhaka Mohammedan for the next season. The 2014–15 season was also very successful for Rana. He scored seven goals for Black and Whites and became the second top scorer in the local merit list of the 2014–15 Bangladesh Premier League.

=== Sheikh Jamal Dhanmondi Club ===
Rana made his AFC Cup debut as a loaned player for Sheikh Jamal Dhanmondi Club against Tampines Rovers on 26 April 2016. He played an important role for the team where his team won the match by 3–2 goals. He also received the Player of the Match award in that match.

=== Abahani Limited Dhaka ===
On 19 June 2019, Rana scored his first goal in AFC Cup against Manang Marshyangdi Club.

== International career ==
For his brilliant performance in domestic football, Rana was called up to the national team by Lodewijk de Kruif in 2015. He made his debut in an International friendly against Singapore on 30 May 2015. He received the Player of the Match award for his performance against Tajikistan during the 2018 FIFA World Cup qualification. He also played well against Asian Giant Jordan in the same qualification round. He missed two easy chances due to his inexperience. He scored his first international goal against Sri Lanka at the 4 Nations Cup.

== International Goals ==
Abahani Limited Dhaka

#	Date	Venue	Opponent	Score	Result	Competition
1.	19 June 2019	Bangabandhu National Stadium, Dhaka	(Nepal) Manang Marshyangdi Club	3–0	5–0	2019 AFC Cup

Bangladesh

#	Date	Venue	Opponent	Score	Result	Competition
1.	16 November 2021	Racecourse Grounds, Colombo	Sri Lanka	1–1	1–2	2021 Four Nations Football Tournament

== Career statistics ==
=== International ===
As of 29 March 2023

Bangladesh National Team
Year	Apps	Goals
2015	11	0
2016	8	0
2018	1	0
2019	1	0
2021	5	1
2022	1	0
Total	27	1
