= Mário Lemos =

Portuguese manager

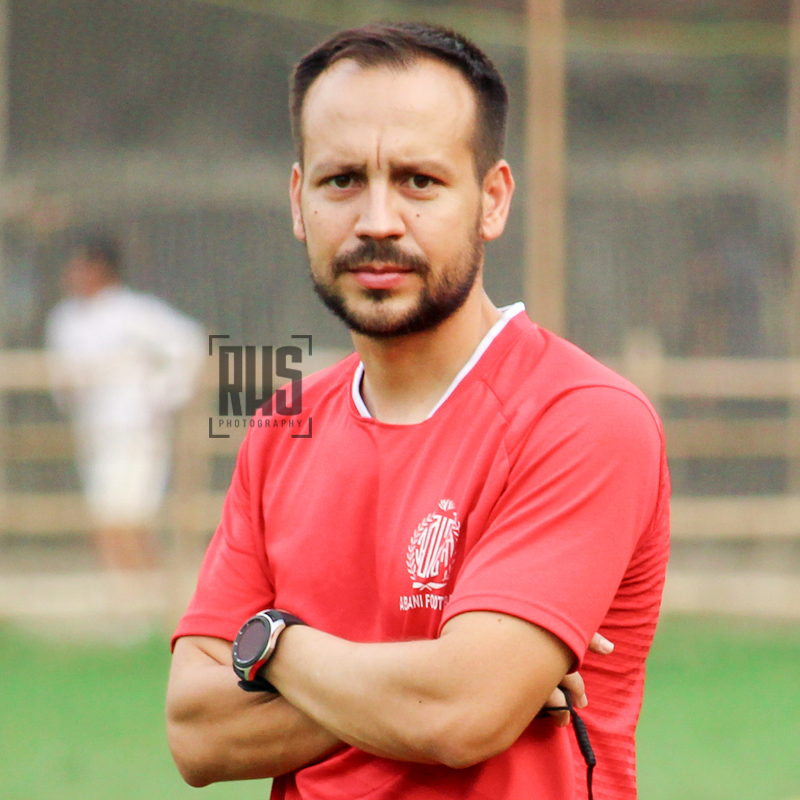
- Lemos with Abahani Limited Dhaka in 2019

Personal information
- Full name: Mário Licinio Guerreiro Lemos
- Date of birth: 14 May 1986 (age 40)
- Place of birth: Albufeira, Portugal
- Height: 1.70 m (5 ft 7 in)
- Position: Attacking midfielder

Senior career*
Years	Team	Apps	(Gls)
2003–2005	FC Ferreiras		

Managerial career
- 2011: GD Lagoa (assistant)
- 2012–2013: Muangthong United (assistant)
- 2013: Muangthong United B (assistant)
- 2017: Yangcheon TNT
- 2018: Negeri Sembilan
- 2018–2023: Abahani Limited Dhaka
- 2021: Bangladesh (interim)
- 2024: Forca Kochi
- 2024–2025: Mumbai City (assistant)
- 2025: Persijap Jepara
- 2026–: Persijap Jepara
- * Club domestic league appearances and goals

Mário Licinio Guerreiro Lemos is a Portuguese football coach and former player, currently with Liga 1 club Persijap Jepara. He played mostly as an attacking midfielder.

On 21 October 2021, Lemos was given the role of interim head coach of the Bangladesh national team for the 2021 Four Nations Football Tournament held in Sri Lanka. After beating Maldives for the first time in 18 years, they were knocked out by Sri Lanka.

== Managerial statistics ==
As of match played 23 May 2026

Managerial record by team and tenure
Team	Nat.	From	To	Record								Ref.
Team	Nat.	From	To	G	W	D	L	GF	GA	GD	Win %	Ref.
Negeri Sembilan	(Malaysia)	10 May 2018	30 November 2018	19	6	2	11	28	33	−5	31.58	
Abahani Limited Dhaka	(Bangladesh)	2 December 2018	13 October 2023	136	90	23	23	328	157	+171	66.18	
Bangladesh (interim)	(Bangladesh)	23 October 2021	20 November 2021	3	1	1	1	4	4	+0	33.33	
Forca Kochi	(India)	11 August 2024	10 November 2024	12	5	4	3	13	10	+3	41.67	
Persijap Jepara	(Indonesia)	9 June 2025	21 November 2025	12	2	2	8	11	20	−9	16.67	
Persijap Jepara	(Indonesia)	17 February 2026	Present	13	5	6	2	14	7	+7	38.46	
Career Total				195	109	38	48	398	231	+167	55.90	

== Honours ==
Abahani Limited Dhaka

- 2019 AFC Cup: South Asia Zone Champions
- Bangladesh Premier League runner-up: 2019, 2021 2022
- Independence Cup: 2021–22
- Federation Cup: 2021–22
- Independence Cup third place: 2021–22

Forca Kochi

- 2024 Super League Kerala Runner-up
