= Riyadul Hasan Rafi =

Bangladeshi footballer

Personal information
- Full name: Riyadul Hasan Rafi
- Date of birth: 29 December 1999 (age 26)
- Place of birth: Chandpur, Bangladesh
- Height: 1.75 m (5 ft 9 in)
- Positions: Right-back; centre-back

Team information
- Current team: Bangladesh Police
- Number: 5

Youth career
- 2014: Sheikh Russel KC

Senior career*
Years	Team	Apps	(Gls)
2014	Little Friends		
2016–2022	Saif SC	91	(5)
2022–2024	Dhaka Abahani	16	(1)
2024–2025	Mohammedan	10	(0)
2025–	Bangladesh Police	0	(0)

International career^{‡}
2017–2018	Bangladesh U19	7	(1)
2018–2021	Bangladesh U23	9	(0)
2019–2021	Bangladesh	18	(0)
Medal record
Representing Bangladesh
SAFF U-18 Championship
Runner-up	2017 Bhutan	Team
South Asian Games
Bronze medal – third place	2019	Team
- * Club domestic league appearances and goals as of 20 May 2025 ‡ National team caps and goals as of 16 November 2021

Riyadul Hasan Rafi (Bengali: রিয়াদুল হাসান রাফি; born 29 December 1999) is a Bangladeshi professional footballer who plays as a defender for Bangladesh Football League club Bangladesh Police FC.

== Career statistics ==
=== Club ===
As of 31 July 2022.

Club	Season	League			Cup (Note: Appearance(s) in Bangladesh Federation Cup)		Other (Note: Appearance(s) in Bangladesh Independence Cup)		Continental		Total	
Club	Season	Division	Apps	Goals	Apps	Goals	Apps	Goals	Apps	Goals	Apps	Goals
Saif SC	2015–16	BCL	14	0	—		—		—		14	0
Saif SC	2017–18	BFL	17	0	0	0	2	0	0	0	19	0
Saif SC	2018–19	BFL	14	1	0	0	3	0	—		17	1
Saif SC	2019–20	BFL	6	0	2	0	—		—		8	0
Saif SC	2020–21	BFL	20	1	5	0	—		—		25	1
Saif SC	2021–22	BFL	20	3	2	0	5	0	—		27	3
Career total			91	5	9	0	10	0	0	0	110	5

=== International apps ===
As of 16 November 2021.

Bangladesh
Year	Apps	Goals
2019	5	0
2020	4	0
2021	9	0
2022	0	0
2023	0	0
Total	18	0

=== International goals ===
==== U-19 team ====
Scores and results list Bangladesh's goal tally first.

No.	Date	Venue	Opponent	Score	Result	Competition
1.	8 November 2017	Hisor Central Stadium, Hisor, Tajikistan	Sri Lanka	2–0	4–0	2018 AFC U-19 Championship qualifiers

== Honours ==
Saif SC

- Bodousa Cup: 2018

Bangladesh U23

- South Asian Games bronze medal: 2019
