= 2020–21 Chittagong Abahani season =

Chittagong Abahani 2020–21 football season

Chittagong Abahani
2020–21 season
- President: M. Abdul Latif
- Head coach: Maruful Haque
- Stadium: Bangabandhu National Stadium
- Bangladesh Premier League: 5th
- Federation Cup: Semi final
- Independence Cup: cancelled
- Top goalscorer: League: Nixon Guylherme (12); All: Nixon Guylherme (13)
- Biggest win: 5–2 vs Saif SC; 4–1 vs Police FC
- Biggest defeat: 0–3 vs Saif SC
Home colours	Away colours
- All statistics correct as of 27 August 2021.

The 2020–21 season was Chittagong Abahani's 41st season since its establishment in 1980 and their 11th season in the Bangladesh Premier League. This also marked their 7th consecutive season in the top flight after getting promoted in 2014. In addition to the domestic league, Ctg Abahani participated in this season's edition of the Federation Cup. The season covered the period from December 2020 to September 2021, with the late ending to the season due to the COVID-19 pandemic in Bangladesh.

On 16 March 2020, all sorts of sports activities in Bangladesh were postponed until 31 March as a precaution to combat the spread of coronavirus in the country, according to a press release issued by the Ministry of Youth and Sports. So the beginning of this season was delayed.

== Season review ==
=== Pre-season ===
Before starting the season, Chittagong Abahani decided to renew the contract of head coach Maruful Haque.

Team management was planning to bring some changes in local player collection & retain foreign players. Nigerian forward Matthew Chinedu left the club in August to join Cypriot club Ypsonas FC. Uzbek defender Shukurali Pulatov also joined Uzbek club FC Turon in September. However, they both rejoined Ctg Abahani in December.

The official announcements of contracts, signings, and camp scheduling were delayed as the vice-president & football committee chairman of the club, Tarafder Ruhul Amin, was sick till early November.

In November, it was announced that veteran goalkeeper Mazharul Islam Himel has signed for Ctg Abahani, replacing Mohammad Nehal as team management did not renewed the contract with Nehal.

== Players ==
Chittagong Abahani Ltd. squad for the 2020–21 season.

As of 19 April 2021

Note: Flags indicate national team as defined under FIFA eligibility rules; some limited exceptions apply. Players may hold more than one non-FIFA nationality.

No.	Pos.	Nation	Player
2	DF	BAN	Mohammad Rockey
3	DF	BAN	Shawkat Russel
4	MF	BAN	Manik Hossain Molla
5	DF	BAN	Monjurur Rahman Manik
6	DF	BAN	Nasirul Islam Nasir (3rd captain)
7	MF	BAN	Rakib Hossain
8	MF	CIV	Kpehi Didier Brossou (Captain)
9	FW	BRA	Nixon Guylherme
10	MF	NGR	Matthew Chinedu
11	MF	BAN	Mohammad Shohel Rana
12	MF	BAN	Koushik Barua
14	MF	BAN	Monaem Khan Raju (Vice-captain)
15	MF	BAN	Shafiqul Islam Bipul
16	MF	BAN	Saker Ullah
17	MF	BAN	Mannaf Rabby

No.	Pos.	Nation	Player
18	MF	BAN	Zahid Parvez Chowdhury
19	MF	BAN	Kawsar Ali Rabbi
20	FW	BAN	Shakhawat Hossain Rony
21	DF	BAN	Ashik Ahammed
22	GK	BAN	Azad Hossain
23	DF	BAN	Monir Alam
25	DF	UZB	Shukurali Pulatov
26	DF	BAN	Saddam Hossain Anny
28	MF	BAN	Mynul Islam
32	DF	BAN	Rashed Hossain
33	GK	BAN	Mohammad Nayeem
35	DF	BAN	Apu Ahammad
40	GK	BAN	Nasarul Islam
44	GK	BAN	Minhaz Uddin Chaudhury

== Transfers ==
=== In ===
No.	Pos	Player	Previous club	Fee	Date	Source
1	GK	(Bangladesh) Mazharul Islam Himel	(Bangladesh) Dhaka Mohammedan	Free transfer	24 November 2020	
10	MF	(Nigeria) Matthew Chinedu	(Cyprus) Ypsonas FC	Free transfer	1 December 2020	
25	DF	(Uzbekistan) Shukurali Pulatov	(Uzbekistan) FC Turon	Free transfer	1 December 2020	
44	GK	(Bangladesh) Minhaz Uddin Chaudhury	Free agent	Free transfer	April 2021	

=== Out ===
No.	Pos	Player	Transferred to	Fee	Date	Source
10	MF	(Nigeria) Matthew Chinedu	(Cyprus) Ypsonas FC	Free transfer	26 August 2020	
25	DF	(Uzbekistan) Shukurali Pulatov	(Uzbekistan) FC Turon	Free transfer	1 September 2020	
1	GK	(Bangladesh) Mohammad Nehal	Bangladesh Police FC	Free transfer	3 December 2020	
1	GK	(Bangladesh) Mazharul Islam Himel	Free agent	Free transfer	May 2021	

=== Loans out ===
No.	Pos	Player	Transferred to	Fee	Date	On loan till	Source
30	FW	(Bangladesh) Shakib Chowdury	(Bangladesh) Fortis FC	Free	January 2021	End of the season	

== Pre-season and friendlies ==
No pre-season and friendly match has been played.

== Competition ==
=== Overview ===
Competition	First match	Last match	Starting round	Final position	Record							
Competition	First match	Last match	Starting round	Final position	Pld	W	D	L	GF	GA	GD	Win %
BPL	18 January 2021	27 August 2021	Matchday 1	5th	24	13	5	6	38	28	+10	54.17
Federation Cup	25 December 2020	6 January 2021	Group Stage	Semifinal	4	2	0	2	3	4	−1	50.00
Independence Cup					0	0	0	0	0	0	+0	—
Total					28	15	5	8	41	32	+9	53.57

Last updated: 27 August 2021
Source: Soccerway

=== Federation Cup ===
==== Group C ====
Pos	Team	Pld	W	D	L	GF	GA	GD	Pts	Qualification
1	Bashundhara Kings	2	2	0	0	4	0	+4	6	Quarter-Finals
2	Chittagong Abahani	2	1	0	1	1	1	0	3	Quarter-Finals
3	Rahmatganj MFS	2	0	0	2	0	4	−4	0	

Source: Global Sports Archive

25 December 2020	Rahmatganj MFS	0–1	Chittagong Abahani	Dhaka
18:00 BST		Report	Nixon 37'	Stadium: Bangabandhu National Stadium; Referee: Bhovon Mohon Talukdar

28 December 2020	Chittagong Abahani	0–1	Bashundhara Kings	Dhaka
17:00 BST		Report	Becerra 49'	Stadium: Bangabandhu National Stadium; Referee: MD. Mizanur Rahman

==== Knockout phase ====
1 January 2021 Quarter Final	Sheikh Russel KC	0–2 (a.e.t.)	Chittagong Abahani	Dhaka
16:00 BST	Rodrigues (penalty missed) 63'	Report	Rakib 107'; Mannaf 113'	Stadium: Bangabandhu National Stadium; Referee: Anisur Rahman

6 January 2021 Semi Final	Chittagong Abahani	0–3	Saif SC	Dhaka
16:00 BST			Ariwachukwu 8'; Ikechukwu 71'; Arafat 90'	Stadium: Bangabandhu National Stadium

=== Premier League ===
==== League table ====
Pos	Team	Pld	W	D	L	GF	GA	GD	Pts	Qualification or relegation
3	Dhaka Abahani (Q)	24	13	8	3	65	29	+36	47	Qualification for AFC Cup qualifying play-offs
4	Saif Sporting Club	24	14	2	8	48	37	+11	44	
5	Chittagong Abahani	24	13	5	6	38	28	+10	44	
6	Dhaka Mohammedan	24	12	7	5	36	25	+11	43	
7	Sheikh Russel KC	24	11	3	10	36	31	+5	36	

Source: Soccerway
Rules for classification: 1) Points; 2) Goal difference; 3) Goals scored.
(Q) Qualify for the AFC competition

==== Results summary ====
Overall								Home						Away					
Pld	W	D	L	GF	GA	GD	Pts	W	D	L	GF	GA	GD	W	D	L	GF	GA	GD
24	13	5	6	38	28	+10	44	5	2	5	16	15	+1	8	3	1	22	13	+9

Source: Soccer24

==== Results by round ====
Round	1	2	3	4	5	6	7	8	9	10	11	12	13	14	15	16	17	18	19	20	21	22	23	24	25	26
Ground	A	H	A	H	A	H	H	A	H	A	H	–	A	H	A	H	A	H	A	A	H	A	H	A	-	H
Result	L	W	W	L	D	L	D	D	W	W	D	–	W	L	W	W	W	L	W	W	W	W	L	D	-	W
Position	10	7	5	6	6	7	7	7	7	6	6	7	7	7	7	6	5	5	5	4	4	4	4	5	6	5

Source: Matches
A = Away; H = Home; W = Win; D = Draw; L = Loss; P = Postponed; - = Rest

==== Matches ====
18 January 2021 Round 1	Sheikh Jamal DC	2–1	Chittagong Abahani	Dhaka
16:00 BST (UTC+6)	Faysal Ahmed (yellow card) 21' S. Kanform (yellow card) 22' Otabek 40' N. Absar 50'	Report	Monir (yellow card) 32' Monjurur (yellow card) 73' N. Guylherme (penalty scored) 84'	Stadium: Bangabandhu National Stadium; Referee: Mizanur Rahman

21 January 2021 Round 2	Chittagong Abahani	1–0	Arambagh KS	Dhaka
15:30 BST (UTC+6)	Nixon 30' Monir (yellow card) 62'	Report		Stadium: Bangabandhu National Stadium; Referee: Anisur Rahman

24 January 2021 Round 3	Saif SC	0–1	Chittagong Abahani	Dhaka
18:00 BST (UTC+6)	Rahim (yellow card) 76' Shahedul (yellow card) 90+2'	Report	Guylherme 24' (yellow card) 49'	Stadium: Bangabandhu National Stadium; Referee: Anisur Rahman

28 January 2021 Round 4	Chittagong Abahani	0–1	Sheikh Russel KC	Dhaka
15:30 BST (UTC+6)	Saker Ullah (yellow card) 23' Rakib (yellow card) 40' Monjurur (yellow card) 47'	Report	Rodrigues 43' Asrorov (yellow card) 73' O. Moneke (yellow card) 82'	Stadium: Bangabandhu National Stadium; Referee: Jashim Akhter

1 February 2021 Round 5	Abahani Limited Dhaka	1–1	Chittagong Abahani	Dhaka
15:30 BST (UTC+6)	Torres 32' (pen.) Raihan (yellow card) 52'	Report	Brossou (yellow card) 33' Guylherme 45+2' (pen.) (penalty missed) 88' Monjurur (yellow card) 63'	Stadium: Bangabandhu National Stadium; Referee: Mizanur Rahman

5 February 2021 Round 6	Chittagong Abahani	0–1	Bashundhara Kings	Dhaka
15:30 BST (UTC+6)	Rakib (yellow card) 66' Shawkat (yellow card) 90+3'	Report	Robinho (yellow card) 55' Sufil 62' Becerra (yellow card) 64' Bishwanath (yellow card) 66' Fernandes (yellow card) 84'	Stadium: Bangabandhu National Stadium; Referee: Jasim Akhter

8 February 2021 Round 7	Chittagong Abahani	2–2	Uttar Baridhara Club	Dhaka
16:00 BST (UTC+6)	Guylherme 40' Kawsar 90+3'	Report	Jintu (yellow card) 36' Sumon 56' Arif Hossain 74'	Stadium: Bangabandhu National Stadium; Referee: Bhubon Torofdar

14 February 2021 Round 8	Police FC	3–3	Chittagong Abahani	Dhaka
15:30 BST (UTC+6)	Arif Khan (yellow card) 11' Pooda 58' Toure (yellow card) 63' (goal) 75' Famoussa 90+3' (pen.)	Report	Guylherme 18' Rakib 20' 49' (yellow card) 64' Monjurur (red card) 90+3'	Stadium: Bangabandhu National Stadium; Referee: Bituraj Barua

17 February 2021 Round 9	Chittagong Abahani	1–0	Brothers Union	Dhaka
18:00 BST (UTC+6)	Manik Molla 72'	Report	Arup (yellow card) 51' Jewel (yellow card) 75' S. Illiasu (yellow card) 81' Zunapio (yellow card) 90+3'	Stadium: Bangabandhu National Stadium; Referee: Bituraj Barua

23 February 2021 Round 10	Rahmatganj MFS	0–2	Chittagong Abahani	Dhaka
16:00 BST (UTC+6)	Elmagraby (yellow card) 6' Akkas Ali (yellow card) 64'	Report	Chinedu 7' Raju (yellow card) 40' Shohel (yellow card) 76' Mannaf 83'	Stadium: Bangabandhu National Stadium; Referee: Jasim Akhter

26 February 2021 Round 11	Chittagong Abahani	1–1	Mohammedan SC	Dhaka
18:15 BST (UTC+6)	Rakib 15' Shohel (yellow card) 34'	Report	Saied Rakib 54'	Stadium: Bangabandhu National Stadium; Referee: Bhubon Torofdar

6 March 2021 Round 13	Muktijoddha Sangsad KC	0–1	Chittagong Abahani	Dhaka
16:00 BST (UTC+6)	Sajon (yellow card) 72'	Report	Guylherme 77' Pulatov (yellow card) 81'	Stadium: Bangabandhu National Stadium; Referee: Mohammed Jalal Uddin

1 May 2021 Round 14	Chittagong Abahani	1–3	Sheikh Jamal DC	Dhaka
21:00 BST (UTC+6)	Koushik 46' Brossou (yellow card) 52' Rakib (red card) 59'	Report	S. Sillah 30' S. Kanform 32' Monir (yellow card) 36' Rezaul 51' Faysal (yellow card) 62' Kasto (yellow card) 63'	Stadium: Bangabandhu National Stadium; Referee: Mizanur Rahman

5 May 2021 Round 15	Arambagh KS	0–1	Chittagong Abahani	Dhaka
19:00 BST (UTC+6)		Report	Brossou 79' (penalty missed) 84'	Stadium: Bangabandhu National Stadium; Referee: Zamal Farouqee Nahid

8 May 2021 Round 16	Chittagong Abahani	5-2	Saif SC	Dhaka
16:00 BST (UTC+6)	Rakib 18' 47' (yellow card) 30' Nasirul (yellow card) 45' Nixon 49' Brossou 64' Mannaf 82'	Report	Okoli 27' (pen.) 68' Jamal (yellow card) 53' Shajjad (yellow card) 78'	Stadium: Bangabandhu National Stadium; Referee: Arisuz Rahman Sagor

11 May 2021 Round 17	Sheikh Russel KC	0–2	Chittagong Abahani	Dhaka
16:00 BST (UTC+6)		Report	Nasirul (yellow card) 26' Nixon 34' Rakib 45+2' Pulatov (yellow card) 57'	Stadium: Bangabandhu National Stadium; Referee: Anisur Rahman

1 July 2021 Round 18	Chittagong Abahani	0–2	Dhaka Abahani	Dhaka
17:00 BST (UTC+6)	Brossou (yellow card) 90+1'	Report	Chizoba 34', (yellow card) 45+1'; Mamunul 52'	Stadium: Bangabandhu National Stadium; Referee: Mohammed Jalaluddin

18 July 2021 Round 19	Bashundhara Kings	1–2	Chittagong Abahani	Dhaka
16:30 BST (UTC+6)	Kazi (yellow card) 26' R. Becerra (penalty missed) 50' Robinho 87'	Report	Md. Nayem (yellow card) 49' Rakib (yellow card) 51'; Chinedu 39', 89'	Stadium: Bangabandhu National Stadium; Referee: Jasim Akhter

3 August 2021 Round 20	Uttar Baridhara Club	3–4	Chittagong Abahani	Dhaka
16:00 BST (UTC+6)	E. Kochnev 59' (pen.) (yellow card) 18' Sumon 67' Maruf 80' Sohel (yellow card) 33'	Report	N. Guylherme 21' 41' Shohel (yellow card) 23' M. Chinedu 50' S. Fozilov 59' (o.g.)	Stadium: BSSS Mostafa Kamal Stadium; Referee: Anisur Rahman

10 August 2021 Round 21	Chittagong Abahani	4–1	Police FC	Dhaka
18:00 BST (UTC+6)	N. Guylherme (penalty scored) 2' Brossou 10' Raju (yellow card) 24' Rakib 45' M. Chinedu 90+1'	Report	Kouakou (penalty missed) 45+3' (penalty missed) 76' Touré (yellow card) 73' Shadhin 79'	Stadium: Bangabandhu National Stadium; Referee: Alamgir Sarker

14 August 2021 Round 22	Brothers Union	1–2	Chittagong Abahani	Dhaka
18:15 BST (UTC+6)	Jitu 23' Titumir (yellow card) 36'; F. Xasanboyev (yellow card) 70'; Mezbah (yellow card) 82'; Mokarom (yellow card) 90'	Report	M. Chinedu 16' Rony (yellow card) 82' Kawsar Rabbi 90+4' (yellow card) 90+5' Shohel (yellow card) 90+6'	Stadium: Bangabandhu National Stadium; Referee: GM Chowdhury

17 August 2021 Round 23	Chittagong Abahani	0–2	Rahmatganj MFS	Dhaka
16:00 BST (UTC+6)	N. Guylherme (penalty missed) 21'	Report	Al Amin (yellow card) 20' Felix Chidi 81' M. Kiron 90+2'	Stadium: Bangladesh Army Stadium; Referee: Mohammed Jalal Uddin

20 August 2021 Round 24	Mohammedan SC	2–2	Chittagong Abahani	Dhaka
16:00 BST (UTC+6)	M. Coulidiati (yellow card) 13' Jafar 22' Diabate (penalty missed) 34' A. Bappy 59' M. Mredha (yellow card) 63'	Report	Brossou 6' M. Chinedu 24' Rakib (yellow card) 28' S. Russell (yellow card) 32'	Stadium: Bangabandhu National Stadium; Referee: Jalal Uddin

27 August 2021 Round 26	Chittagong Abahani	1–0	Muktijoddha Sangsad KC	Dhaka
17:15 BST (UTC+6)	M. Chinedu 11'	Report		Stadium: BSSS Mostafa Kamal Stadium; Referee: Mohammad Alamgir

== Statistics ==
=== Squad statistics ===
No.	Pos	Nat	Player	Total		BPL		Federation Cup		Independence Cup	
No.	Pos	Nat	Player	Apps	Goals	Apps	Goals	Apps	Goals	Apps	Goals
1	GK	(Bangladesh)	Mazharul Islam Himel	2	0	2	0	0	0	-	-
2	DF	(Bangladesh)	Mohammad Rokey	6	0	5	0	1	0	-	-
3	DF	(Bangladesh)	Shawkat Russell	17	0	14+3	0	0	0	-	-
4	MF	(Bangladesh)	Manik Hossain Molla	20	1	14+2	1	4	0	-	-
5	DF	(Bangladesh)	Monjurur Rahman Manik	19	0	15	0	4	0	-	-
6	DF	(Bangladesh)	Nasirul Islam Nasir	23	0	19+1	0	3	0	-	-
7	MF	(Bangladesh)	Rakib Hossain	25	8	21	7	2+2	1	-	-
8	MF	(Ivory Coast)	Kpehi Didier Brossou	20	4	15+1	4	4	0	-	-
9	FW	(Brazil)	Nixon Guylherme	25	13	21+2	12	2	1	-	-
10	MF	(Nigeria)	Matthew Chinedu	25	8	23+1	8	1	0	-	-
11	MF	(Bangladesh)	Shohel Rana	20	0	11+6	0	3	0	-	-
12	MF	(Bangladesh)	Kawshik Barua	22	1	12+7	1	0+3	0	-	-
14	MF	(Bangladesh)	Monaem Khan Raju	21	0	9+8	0	4	0	-	-
15	MF	(Bangladesh)	Shafiqul Islam Bipul	2	0	0+2	0	0	0	-	-
16	MF	(Bangladesh)	Saker Ullah	17	0	8+8	0	0+1	0	-	-
17	MF	(Bangladesh)	Mannaf Rabby	25	3	5+16	2	4	1	-	-
18	MF	(Bangladesh)	Zahid Parvez Chowdhury	0	0	0	0	0	0	-	-
19	MF	(Bangladesh)	Kawsar Ali Rabbi	15	2	3+8	2	0+4	0	-	-
20	FW	(Bangladesh)	Shakhawat Hossain Rony	10	0	1+9	0	0	0	-	-
21	DF	(Bangladesh)	Ashik Ahammed	1	0	1	0	0	0	-	-
22	GK	(Bangladesh)	Azad Hossain	1	0	1	0	0	0	-	-
23	DF	(Bangladesh)	Monir Alam	27	0	22+1	0	4	0	-	-
25	DF	(Uzbekistan)	Shukurali Pulatov	19	0	15	0	4	0	-	-
26	DF	(Bangladesh)	Saddam Hossain Anny	3	0	2+1	0	0	0	-	-
28	MF	(Bangladesh)	Mynul Islam	0	0	0	0	0	0	-	-
30	FW	(Bangladesh)	Shakib Chowdhury	0	0	0	0	0	0	-	-
32	DF	(Bangladesh)	Rashed Hossain	0	0	0	0	0	0	-	-
33	GK	(Bangladesh)	Mohammad Nayem	25	0	21	0	4	0	-	-
35	DF	(Bangladesh)	Apu Ahammad	5	0	4+1	0	0	0	-	-
40	GK	(Bangladesh)	Nasarul Islam	0	0	0	0	0	0	-	-
44	GK	(Bangladesh)	Minhaz Uddin Chowdhury	0	0	0	0	0	0	-	-

Last updated: 27 August 2021
Source: Soccerway

=== Goalscorers ===
As of matches played till 27 August 2021

Rank	Nat	Player	Position	Total	BPL	Federation Cup	Independence Cup
1	(Brazil)	Nixon Guylherme	FW	13	12	1	–
2	(Bangladesh)	Rakib Hossain	FW	8	7	1	–
2	(Nigeria)	Matthew Chinedu	FW	8	8	0	–
4	(Ivory Coast)	Didier Brossou	MF	4	4	0	–
5	(Bangladesh)	Mannaf Rabby	FW	3	2	1	–
6	(Bangladesh)	Kawsar Ali Rabbi	FW	2	2	0	–
7	(Bangladesh)	Kawshik Barua	MF	1	1	0	–
7	(Bangladesh)	Manik Molla	MF	1	1	0	–
Own goals				1	1	0	
Total				41	38	3	0

=== Assists ===
As of matches played till 27 August 2021

Rank	Nat.	Player	Position	Total	BPL	Federation Cup	Independence Cup
1	(Bangladesh)	Rakib Hossain	FW	6	6	0	–
2	(Ivory Coast)	Didier Brossou	MF	4	3	1	–
3	(Bangladesh)	Monaem Khan Raju	MF	3	3	0	–
3	(Nigeria)	Matthew Chinedu	FW	3	3	0	–
3	(Brazil)	Nixon Guylherme	FW	3	3	0	–
6	(Bangladesh)	Mannaf Rabby	FW	1	1	0	–
6	(Bangladesh)	Nasirul Islam Nasir	DF	1	1	0	–
6	(Bangladesh)	Monir Alam	DF	1	0	1	–
6	(Bangladesh)	Shohel Rana	MF	1	0	1	–
6	(Bangladesh)	Mohammad Nayeem	GK	1	1	0	–
6	(Bangladesh)	Kawshik Barua	MF	1	1	0	
Total				25	22	3	0
