= 2019–20 Chittagong Abahani season =

Chittagong Abahani
2019–20 season
- President: M. Abdul Latif
- Head coach: Maruful Haque
- Stadium: MA Aziz Stadium, Chittagong, Bangladesh
- Bangladesh Premier League: 2nd of 13
- Federation Cup: Quarter Finals
- Independence Cup: cancelled
- Top goalscorer: League: Nixon Guylherme (4 Goals); All: Nixon Guylherme (5 Goals)
- Biggest win: Chittagong Abahani 2–0 Brothers Union Chittagong Abahani 2–0 Bashundhara Kings Chittagong Abahani 2–0 Sheikh Jamal Dhanmondi Club
- Biggest defeat: Dhaka Mohammedan 2–0 Chittagong Abahani
Home colours	Away colours

The 2019–20 season was the Chittagong Abahani's 40th season since its establishment in 1980 and their 10th season in the Bangladesh Premier League. This also remarked their sixth consecutive season in the top flight after getting promoted in 2014. In addition to domestic league, Ctg Abahani also participated on this season's edition of Federation Cup.

On 16 March 2020, All sorts of sports activities in Bangladesh were postponed until March 31 as a precaution to combat the spread of coronavirus in the country, according to a press release issued by the Ministry of Youth and Sports.

Bangladesh Football Federation (BFF) postponed all Bangladesh Premier League matches until March 31.

On 17 May 2020, The BFF executive committee, following an emergency meeting, declared the 12th edition of the league abandoned, scrapping promotion and relegation while cancelling the Independence Cup from the calendar.

== Summary ==
=== Pre-season ===
In October 2019, Chittagong Abahani organized and participated in 2019 Sheikh Kamal International Club Cup. Players including Bangladesh National Football Team captain Jamal Bhuyan, 2010 FIFA World Cup Quarterfinalist Prince Tagoe, Luka Rotkovic, Petar Planić were signed for the tournament. They also signed former National Team head coach Maruful Haque. Chittagong Abahani started the tournament with a 4–1 win against Maldivian side TC Sports Club. Abahani also beaten Young Elephants FC by 4–2 but lost with Mohun Bagan by 1–0. In semi-final, Abahani beaten Gokulam Kerala FC with an extra-time goal. However, Chittagong Abahani defeated by Terengganu FC in the Final and finished the tournament as runners-up. Luka, who scored three goals, was top scorer for Abahani in the tournament. The players who joined the team on loan and foreigners except Ikbol, Didier and Matthew were released after the tournament.

On November 20, Abahani signed a one-year contract with Maruful Haque. The signing made record as Maruful became highest paid local head coach of that season. Brazilian footballer Nixon Guylherme and Uzbek defender Shukurali Pulatov were signed to fill up foreign quota while Bangladesh international Nasirul Islam Nasir, Monjurur Rahman Manik, Rakib Hossain, Mohammad Rocky etc. were also signed to form a strong squad for upcoming season.

From December 4 to December 8, Chittagong Abahani took part in Mymensingh DFA Challenge Cup, a pre-season tournament, along with Saif Sporting Club and Bangladesh Police FC. The tournament was won by defeating Police FC in final with 1–0 margin.

=== December ===
In this month, the new football season started with 2019 Federation cup. Abahani played first match of the season against Brother Union on 22 December and won it by 2–0 with goals scored by Nixon and Matthew. Five days later, the last match of Group B against Bashundhara kings was won with 2–0 score. Rakib and Didier scored the goals. Abahani qualified for the knockout stage as group champion. Three days later, Abahani suffered a 2–0 defeat against Dhaka Mohammedan in quarter-final and were knocked out from 2019 Federation Cup.

=== January ===
The club started the new year with good news as two players from the team, Manik Hossain Mollah, Monjurur Rahman Manik and Rakib Hossain called up in 23-men squad of Bangladesh National Team for 2020 Bangabandhu Cup. Rakib and Manik both made their international debut against Sri Lanka.

=== February ===
Ctg Abahani started 2019-20 BPL against Sheikh Jamal DC on 13 February. The away match was won with 2–0 as Didier and Matthew found the net. Five days later, the team suffered a 2–1 defeat against Arambagh KS in the first home game of the league. Shakhawat Rony scored the only goal in that match. On 23 February, Ctg Abahani played a 2–2 draw with Saif SC at Mymensingh conceding two late goals. Nixon & Matthew scored in that match. Mohammad Nayeem made his debut for the team in this match.

=== March ===
Ctg Abahani played their second home game of the league against Sheikh Russel KC on 2 March. The match was won by 2-0 Nixon & Mannaf Rabby scored. Five days later, Ctg Abahani defeated defending runners-up Dhaka Abahani by 2–0 on away schedule. Didier & Nasirul found the net on the game. On 15 March, they faced defending champion Bashundhara Kings at Nilphamari. Ctg Abahani made a historic comeback from 3–0 to 3-4 & won the match. Nixon netted a brace when Didier & Matthew each scored one goal. Mannaf Rabby provided two assists. On 16 March, remaining matches of month postponed till 31st march due to coronavirus outbreak.

== Players ==
Chittagong Abahani Ltd. squad for 2019–20 season.

As of 25 November 2019

Note: Flags indicate national team as defined under FIFA eligibility rules; some limited exceptions apply. Players may hold more than one non-FIFA nationality.

No.	Pos.	Nation	Player
1	GK	BAN	Mohammad Nehal
2	DF	BAN	Mohammad Rockey
3	DF	BAN	Shawkat Russel
4	MF	BAN	Manik Hossain Molla
5	DF	BAN	Monjurur Rahman Manik
6	DF	BAN	Nasirul Islam Nasir
7	MF	BAN	Rakib Hossain
8	MF	CIV	Kpehi Didier Brossou (Captain)
9	FW	BRA	Nixon Guylherme
10	MF	NGR	Matthew Chinedu
11	MF	BAN	Mohammad Shohel Rana
12	MF	BAN	Koushik Barua (3rd captain)
14	MF	BAN	Monaem Khan Raju (2nd captain)
15	MF	BAN	Shafiqul Islam
16	MF	BAN	Saker Ullah
17	MF	BAN	Mannaf Rabby

No.	Pos.	Nation	Player
18	MF	BAN	Zahed Parvez Chowdhury
19	MF	BAN	Kawsar Ali Rabbi
20	FW	BAN	Shakhawat Hossain Rony
21	DF	BAN	Ashik Ahammed
22	GK	BAN	Azad Hossain
23	DF	BAN	Monir Alam
24	DF	UZB	Ikbol Bobohonov
25	DF	UZB	Shukurali Pulatov
26	DF	BAN	Saddam Hossain
28	MF	BAN	Mynul Islam
30	FW	BAN	Shakib Chowdhury
32	DF	BAN	Rashed Hossain
33	GK	BAN	Mohammad Nayeem
35	DF	BAN	Apu Ahammad
40	GK	BAN	Nasarul Islam

== Pre-season and friendlies ==
12 October 2019 Friendly	Bangladesh Police FC	0–3	Chittagong Abahani	Dhaka
			Matthew; Koushik; Rockey	Stadium: APBN Ground

4 December 2019 Mymensingh DFA Challenge Cup	Chittagong Abahani	2-2 (3-4 p)	Bangladesh Police FC	Mymensingh
	Koushik; Nixon (penalty scored)	Report	Rotkovic Sidney	Stadium: Mymensingh Stadium
	Penalties
	Nixon (penalty scored) Pulatov (penalty scored) Ikbol (penalty missed) Manik (penalty scored) Zahid (penalty missed)

5 December 2019 Mymensingh DFA Challenge Cup	Saif SC	0-0 (2-3 p)	Chittagong Abahani	Mymensingh
				Stadium: Mymensingh Stadium
	Penalties
			(penalty scored) Nixon (penalty scored) Ikbol (penalty missed) Pulatov (penalty scored) Nasirul
Note: Chittagong Abahani goalkeeper Nayeem made two saves in tiebreaker.

8 December 2019 Mymensingh DFA Challenge Cup Final	Chittagong Abahani	1-0	Bangladesh Police FC	Mymensingh
	Pulatov 59'	Report		Stadium: Mymensingh Stadium

3 February 2020 Friendly	Chittagong Abahani	0–0	Dhaka Mohammedan	Dhaka
				Stadium: Aliganj Sports Ground

== Competitions ==
Competition	First match	Last match	Starting round	Final position	Record							
Competition	First match	Last match	Starting round	Final position	Pld	W	D	L	GF	GA	GD	Win %
BPL	13 February 2020	15 March 2020	Matchday 1	2nd	6	4	1	1	13	7	+6	66.67
Federation Cup	19 December 2019	30 December 2019	Group stage	Quarter Final	3	2	0	1	4	2	+2	66.67
Sheikh Kamal International Club Cup	19 October 2019	31 October 2019	Group stage	Runners-up	5	3	0	2	12	8	+4	60.00
Total					14	9	1	4	29	17	+12	64.29

Source: UNB Soccerway

=== Group B ===
Pos	Team	Pld	W	D	L	GF	GA	GD	Pts	Qualification
1	Chittagong Abahani	2	2	0	0	4	0	+4	6	Quarter-Finals
2	Bashundhara Kings	2	1	0	1	1	2	−1	3	Quarter-Finals
3	Brothers Union	2	0	0	2	0	3	−3	0	

Updated to match(es) played on 27 December 2019. Source: Soccerway

22 December 2019 Match 1	Chittagong Abahani	2-0	Brothers Union	Dhaka
18:15 BST	Nixon Guylherme 34'; Chinedu 82'	Report		Stadium: Bangabandhu National Stadium; Referee: SH Sany (Bangladesh)

27 December 2019 Match 2	Chittagong Abahani	2-0	Bashundhara Kings	Bangabandhu National Stadium, Dhaka
15:30 BST	Rakib 25'; Brossou 45+2'	Report		Referee: Mizanur Rahman (Bangladesh)

=== Knockout stage ===
30 December 2019 Quarter-finals	Chittagong Abahani	0–2	Dhaka Mohammedan	Dhaka
18:30 BST		Report	Shahed 25'; Diabate 30'	Stadium: Bangabandhu National Stadium; Referee: Bhovon Mohon Talukdar (Bangladesh)

=== Premier League ===
==== League table ====
Pos	Team	Pld	W	D	L	GF	GA	GD	Pts
1	Dhaka Abahani Ltd.	6	4	1	1	12	4	+8	13
2	Chittagong Abahani Ltd.	6	4	1	1	13	7	+6	13
3	Lt. Sheikh Jamal DC	5	4	0	1	10	5	+5	12
4	Dhaka Mohammedan SC Ltd.	6	4	0	2	8	7	+1	12
5	Saif Sporting Club	6	3	2	1	8	5	+3	11

Source: Soccerway
Rules for classification: 1) Points; 2) Goal difference; 3) Goals scored.

==== Results summary ====
Overall								Home						Away					
Pld	W	D	L	GF	GA	GD	Pts	W	D	L	GF	GA	GD	W	D	L	GF	GA	GD
6	4	1	1	13	7	+6	13	1	0	1	3	2	+1	3	1	0	10	5	+5

Last updated: 15 March 2020.
Source: Soccerway

==== Results by round ====
Round	1	2	3	4	5	6	7	8	9	10	11	12	13	14	15	16	17	18	19	20	21	22	23	24
Ground	A	H	A	H	A	A	H	H	H	A	H	A	H	A	H	A	H	H	A	A	A	H	A	H
Result	W	L	D	W	W	W	C	C	C	C	C	C	C	C	C	C	C	C	C	C	C	C	C	C
Position	2	4	5	4	1	2	2	2	2	2	2	2	2	2	2	2	2	2	2	2	2	2	2	2

Updated to match(es) played on 15 May 2020. Source: Matches
A = Away; H = Home; W = Win; D = Draw; L = Loss; P = Postponed; C = Cancelled

==== Matches ====
13 February 2020 1	Sheikh Jamal Dhanmondi Club	0–2	Chittagong Abahani	Dhaka
6:30PM BST		Report	55' Matthew; 65' Didier	Stadium: Bangabandhu National Stadium; Referee: Mohamed Mizanur Rahman

18 February 2020 2	Chittagong Abahani	1–2	Arambagh KS	Chittagong
6:30PM BST	Rony 45+1'	Report	Kingsley 37', 45+2'	Stadium: MA Aziz Stadium; Referee: Jalaluddin

23 February 2020 3	Saif Sporting Club	2-2	Chittagong Abahani	Mymensingh
15:15 BST	Bayisenge 90', 90+5'	Report	Nixon Guylherme 61'; Chinedu 77'	Stadium: Rafiq Uddin Bhuiyan Stadium; Referee: Sujt Chandan Banarjee

2 March 2020 4	Chittagong Abahani	2–0	Sheikh Russel KC	Chittagong
18:30 BST	Nixon Guylherme 18'; Mannaf 90+1'	Report		Stadium: MA Aziz Stadium; Referee: Bhovon Mohon Talukdar

7 March 2020 5	Dhaka Abahani	0-2	Chittagong Abahani	Dhaka
18:30 BST		Report	Brossou 63'; Nasirul 90+5'	Stadium: Bangabandhu National Stadium; Referee: Sujit Chandan Banarjee

15 March 2020 6	Bashundhara Kings	3–4	Chittagong Abahani	Nilphamari
15:15 BST	43' (pen.) Nazarov; 45+3' Delmonte; 59' Daniel	Report	64' Didier; 67' (pen.), 87' Nixon Guylherme; 90+5' Matthew	Stadium: Sheikh Kamal Stadium; Referee: Bharat Chandra Gour

5 April 2020 7	Chittagong Abahani	Cancelled	Uttar Baridhara	Chittagong
				Stadium: MA Aziz Stadium

8 April 2020 8	Chittagong Abahani	Cancelled	Bangladesh Police FC	Chittagong
				Stadium: MA Aziz Stadium

11 April 2020 9	Chittagong Abahani	Cancelled	Brothers Union	Chittagong
				Stadium: MA Aziz Stadium

21 April 2020 10	Rahmatganj MFS	Cancelled	Chittagong Abahani	Dhaka
				Stadium: Bangabandhu National Stadium

25 April 2020 11	Chittagong Abahani	Cancelled	Dhaka Mohammedan	Chittagong
				Stadium: MA Aziz Stadium

8 May 2020 12	Muktijoddha Sangsad KC	Cancelled	Chittagong Abahani	Gopalganj
				Stadium: Sheikh Fazlul Haque Mani Stadium

19 May 2020 13	Chittagong Abahani	Cancelled	Sheikh Jamal DC	Chittagong
				Stadium: MA Aziz Stadium

22 May 2020 14	Arambagh KS	Cancelled	Chittagong Abahani	Dhaka
				Stadium: Bangabandhu National Stadium

13 June 2020 15	Chittagong Abahani	Cancelled	Saif SC	Chittagong
				Stadium: MA Aziz Stadium

16	Sheikh Russel KC	Cancelled	Chittagong Abahani	Sylhet
				Stadium: Sylhet District Stadium

17	Chittagong Abahani	Cancelled	Dhaka Abahani	Chittagong
				Stadium: MA Aziz Stadium

18	Chittagong Abahani	Cancelled	Bashundhara Kings	Chittagong
				Stadium: MA Aziz Stadium

19	Uttar Baridhara	Cancelled	Chittagong Abahani	Dhaka
				Stadium: Bangabandhu National Stadium

20	Bangladesh Police FC	Cancelled	Chittagong Abahani	Dhaka
				Stadium: Bangabandhu National Stadium

21	Brothers Union	Cancelled	Chittagong Abahani	Dhaka
				Stadium: Bangabandhu National Stadium

22	Chittagong Abahani	Cancelled	Rahmatganj MFS	Chittagong
				Stadium: MA Aziz Stadium

23	Dhaka Mohammedan	Cancelled	Chittagong Abahani	Comilla
				Stadium: Shaheed Dhirendranath Datta Stadium

24	Chittagong Abahani	Cancelled	Muktijoddha Sangsad KC	Chittagong
				Stadium: MA Aziz Stadium

=== Sheikh Kamal International Club Cup ===
==== Group stage ====
Pos	Team	Pld	W	D	L	GF	GA	GD	Pts	Qualification
1	(Bangladesh) Chittagong Abahani (H)	3	2	0	1	8	4	+4	6	Advance to Semi-finals
2	(India) Mohun Bagan	3	2	0	1	4	2	+2	6	Advance to Semi-finals
3	(Laos) Young Elephants	3	2	0	1	6	6	0	6	
4	(Maldives) TC Sports Club	3	0	0	3	2	8	−6	0	

Source: GSA
(H) Hosts

19 October 2019 1	(Bangladesh) Chittagong Abahani	4-1	(Maldives) TC Sports Club	Chittagong, Bangladesh
	Chinedu 8', 39'; Arafat 10'; Rotković 71'	Report	A. Ghanee (yellow card) 60'; Easa 88'	Stadium: M. A. Aziz Stadium; Referee: Murad Alzawahreh (Jordan)

23 October 2019 2	Young Elephant F.C. (Laos)	2-4	(Bangladesh) Chittagong Abahani	Chittagong, Bangladesh
	Thanakhanty 14'; Keohanam 33'	Report	Chinedu 9'; Rotković 54'; Bhuyan 72'; Brossou 78'	Stadium: M. A. Aziz Stadium; Referee: Sudish Kumar Pandey (Nepal)

25 October 2019 3	Chittagong Abahani (Bangladesh)	0–1	(India) Mohun Bagan AC	Chittagong, Bangladesh
		Report	Suhair 59'	Stadium: M. A. Aziz Stadium; Referee: Shraban Kumar Tamang (Nepal)

==== Knockout phase ====
===== Semi-final =====
28 October 2019 Semi-final	Chittagong Abahani (Bangladesh)	3-2	(India) Gokulam Kerala F.C.	Chittagong, Bangladesh
	Brossou 47', 90'; Chinedu 105'	Report	Kisekka 29'; Joseph 80'	Stadium: M. A. Aziz Stadium; Referee: Murad Alzawahreh (Jordan)

===== Final =====
31 October 2019 Final	Chittagong Abahani (Bangladesh)	1-2	(Malaysia) Terengganu F.C.	Chittagong, Bangladesh
	Rotković 48'	Report	Hakim 15'; Alias 20'	Stadium: M. A. Aziz Stadium; Referee: Sudish Kumar Pandey (Nepal)

== Statistics ==
=== Squad statistics ===
No.	Pos	Nat	Player	Total		BPL		Federation Cup		Sheikh Kamal International Club Cup	
No.	Pos	Nat	Player	Apps	Goals	Apps	Goals	Apps	Goals	Apps	Goals
1	GK	(Bangladesh)	Mohammad Nehal	8	0	2	0	2	0	4	0
2	DF	(Bangladesh)	Mohammad Rockey	3	0	1	0	0	0	1+1	0
3	DF	(Bangladesh)	Shawkat Russel	5	0	2+1	0	2	0	-	-
4	MF	(Bangladesh)	Manik Hossain Molla	14	0	6	0	0+3	0	3+2	0
5	DF	(Bangladesh)	Monjurur Rahman Manik	8	0	4	0	3	0	0+1	0
6	DF	(Bangladesh)	Nasirul Islam Nasir	9	1	5+1	1	3	0	-	-
7	MF	(Bangladesh)	Rakib Hossain	9	1	6	0	3	1	-	-
8	MF	(Ivory Coast)	Kpehi Didier Brossou	14	7	6	3	3	1	5	3
9	FW	(Brazil)	Nixon Guylherme	8	5	5+1	4	2	1	-	-
10	MF	(Nigeria)	Matthew Chinedu	14	8	6	3	3	1	4+1	4
11	MF	(Bangladesh)	Shohel Rana	5	0	0	0	0	0	3+2	0
12	MF	(Bangladesh)	Koushik Barua	1	0	0	0	0+1	0	-	-
14	MF	(Bangladesh)	Monaem Khan Raju	9	0	6	0	3	0	-	-
15	MF	(Bangladesh)	Shafiqul Islam	0	0	0	0	0	0	-	-
16	MF	(Bangladesh)	Saker Ullah	3	0	0+2	0	0	0	1	0
17	MF	(Bangladesh)	Mannaf Rabby	6	1	0+3	1	0+3	0	-	-
18	MF	(Bangladesh)	Zahid Parvez Chowdhury	0	0	0	0	0	0	-	-
19	MF	(Bangladesh)	Kawsar Ali Rabbi	6	0	0+1	0	0+1	0	1+3	0
20	FW	(Bangladesh)	Shakhawat Hossain Rony	5	1	1+2	1	1+1	0	-	-
21	DF	(Bangladesh)	Ashik Ahammed	0	0	0	0	0	0	-	-
22	GK	(Bangladesh)	Azad Hossain	1	0	0	0	1	0	-	-
23	DF	(Bangladesh)	Monir Alam	9	0	5+1	0	3	0	-	-
24	DF	(Uzbekistan)	Ikbol Bobohonov	10	0	1+3	0	1	0	5	0
25	DF	(Uzbekistan)	Shukurali Pulatov	8	0	5	0	3	0	-	-
26	DF	(Bangladesh)	Saddam Hossain	1	0	1	0	0	0	-	-
28	MF	(Bangladesh)	Mynul Islam	0	0	0	0	0	0	-	-
30	FW	(Bangladesh)	Shakib Chowdhury	0	0	0	0	0	0	-	-
32	DF	(Bangladesh)	Rashed Hossain	0	0	0	0	0	0	-	-
33	GK	(Bangladesh)	Mohammad Nayeem	4	0	4	0	0	0	-	-
35	DF	(Bangladesh)	Apu Ahammad	0	0	0	0	0	0	-	-
40	GK	(Bangladesh)	Nasarul Islam	0	0	0	0	0	0	-	-
Players who left during the season but made appearance
	FW	(Montenegro)	Luka Rotković	5	3	-	-	-	-	5	3
	DF	(Bangladesh)	Riyadul Hasan Rafi	4	0	-	-	-	-	4	0
	MF	(Bangladesh)	Jamal Bhuyan	5	1	-	-	-	-	4+1	1
	DF	(Bangladesh)	Rahmat Mia	4	0	-	-	-	-	4	0
	DF	(Bangladesh)	Yeasin Arafat	5	1	-	-	-	-	5	1
	FW	(Bangladesh)	Arifur Rahman	5	0	-	-	-	-	4+1	0
	DF	(Serbia)	Petar Planić	3	0	-	-	-	-	1+2	0
	GK	(Bangladesh)	Mazharul Islam Himel	1	0	-	-	-	-	1	0

Last updated: 17 March 2020
Source: Soccerway

=== Goals ===
Rank	Player	Position	Total	BPL	Federation Cup	Independence Cup
1	(Brazil) Nixon Guylherme	FW	5	4	1	0
2	(Nigeria) Chinedu Mathew	MF	4	3	1	0
2	(Ivory Coast) Didier Brossou	MF	4	3	1	0
3	(Bangladesh) Rakib Hossain	MF	1	0	1	0
3	(Bangladesh) Shakhawat Rony	FW	1	1	0	0
3	(Bangladesh) Mannaf Rabby	MF/FW	1	1	0	0
3	(Bangladesh) Nasirul Islam Nasir	DF	1	1	0	0
Own goals			0	0	0	0
Total			17	13	4	0

=== Goalkeeping Statistics ===
			Total			BPL		Federation Cup		Independence Cup	
No.	Pos.	Player	Matches played	Clean sheet (%)	Goals Conceded	Clean sheet (%)	Goals Conceded	Clean sheet (%)	Goals conceded	Clean sheet (%)	Goals conceded
1	GK	(Bangladesh) Mohammad Nehal	4	2 (50%)	4	1 (50%)	2	1 (50%)	2	—	
22	GK	(Bangladesh) Azad Hossain	1	1(100%)	0	0 (0%)	0	1 (100%)	0	—	
33	GK	(Bangladesh) Mohammad Nayeem	4	2(50%)	5	2 (50%)	5	—	—		
TOTALS			9	5 (55%)	9	3 (33%)	7	2 (66%)	2	—	
