= 2018–19 Chittagong Abahani season =

Chittagong Abahani 2018–19 football season

Chittagong Abahani
2018–19 season
- President: M. Abdul Latif
- Head coach: Zulfiker Mahmud Mintu
- Stadium: Bangabandhu National Stadium
- Bangladesh Premier League: 8th
- Federation Cup: Quarter final
- Independence Cup: Quarter final
- Top goalscorer: League: Momodou Bah (6); All: Momodou Bah (11)
- Biggest win: 3–0 v NoFeL SC (Neutral); 3 December 2018 (Independence Cup); 0–3 v NoFeL SC (Away); 12 April 2019 (Premier League); 1–4 v Muktijoddha SKC (Away); 9 May 2019 (Premier League); 3–0 v Sheikh Russel KC (Home); 2 July 2019 (Premier League)
- Biggest defeat: 3–0 v Bashundhara Kings (Away); 18 April 2019 (Premier League)

The 2018–19 season was the Chittagong Abahani's 39th season since its establishment in 1980 and their 9th season in the Bangladesh Premier League. This also remarks their 5th consecutive season in the top flight after getting promoted in 2014. In addition to domestic league, Ctg Abahani also participated on this season's edition of Federation Cup and Independence Cup.

== Players ==
Chittagong Abahani Ltd. squad for 2018–19 season.

As of 3 August 2019
Note: Flags indicate national team as has been defined under FIFA eligibility rules. Players may hold more than one non-FIFA nationality.

No.	Player	Nat.	Position(s)	Date Of birth (age)	Year Signed	Previous club
Goalkeepers
1	Mohammad Nehal	(Bangladesh)	GK	12 May 1990 (aged 29)	2017	Mohammedan SC
22	Russel Mahmud Liton	(Bangladesh)	GK	30 November 1994 (aged 24)	2018	Mohammedan SC
30	Azad Hossain	(Bangladesh)	GK	15 February 1999 (aged 20)	2021	Muktijoddha Sangsad KC
40	Nasarul Islam	(Bangladesh)	GK	23 March 2003 (aged 16)	2018	Free agent
Defenders
3	Kesto Kumar Bose	(Bangladesh)	CB	16 April 1992 (aged 27)	2018	Sheikh Jamal DC
4	Daniel Tagoe	(Kyrgyzstan)	CB/DM	3 March 1986 (aged 33)	2018	(Kyrgyzstan) FC Dordoi Bishkek
5	Kazi Shariful Islam Sajib	(Bangladesh)	CB	-	2018	Rahmatganj MFS
13	Ashik Barua	(Bangladesh)	CB	-	2018	Youth team
16	Arif Khan Joy	(Bangladesh)	RB/LB	15 January 1995 (aged 24)	2018	Brothers Union
17	Monsur Amin	(Bangladesh)	LB	15 May 1997 (aged 22)	2017	unknown
21	Arup Kumar Baidya	(Bangladesh)	RB	2 September 1987 (aged 31)	2018	Sheikh Russel KC
23	Monir Alam	(Bangladesh)	LB/RB	24 March 2000 (aged 19)	2018	Muktijoddha Sangsad KC
24	Sheikh Khalekuzzaman Sabuj	(Bangladesh)	DF	13 October 1988 (aged 30)	2018	Farashganj SC
25	Mufta Lawal	(Nigeria)	CB	6 June 1993 (aged 26)	2017	Muktijoddha Sangsad KC
26	Mehedi Hasan Mithu	(Bangladesh)	RB/CB	24 October 1994 (aged 24)	2019	Bangladesh Army
Midfielders
6	Nazmul Islam Rasel	(Bangladesh)	DM	8 April 1996 (aged 23)	2018	Muktijoddha Sangsad KC
7	Naimur Rahman Shahed	(Bangladesh)	CM/AM	18 March 1993 (aged 26)	2018	Rahmatganj MFS
8	Monaem Khan Raju (Captain)	(Bangladesh)	DM/CM	7 July 1990 (aged 29)	2018	Sheikh Russel KC
12	Koushik Barua	(Bangladesh)	CM/AM	4 October 1995 (aged 23)	2014	Agrani Bank Ltd. SC
14	Mostajeb Khan	(Bangladesh)	CM	4 April 2000 (aged 19)	2018	Saif Sporting Club
19	Sahed Hossain	(Bangladesh)	CM	15 March 1995 (aged 24)	2018	Mohammedan SC
88	Anik Hossain	(Bangladesh)	CM	3 August 1998 (aged 21)	2019	Saif Sporting Club
Forwards
9	Sohel Miah	(Bangladesh)	CF/RW	15 December 1985 (aged 33)	2018	Sheikh Jamal DC
10	Mamadou Bah	(The Gambia)	RW/LW	22 December 1996 (aged 22)	2022	Sheikh Jamal DC
11	Abdul Baten Mojumdar Komol	(Bangladesh)	RW/LW	2 August 1987 (aged 32)	2018	Mohammedan SC
15	Mohammed Abdul Malek	(Bangladesh)	FW	12 January 1995 (aged 24)	2018	Muktijoddha Sangsad KC
18	Fahim Morshed	(Bangladesh)	RW/LW	1 February 2002 (aged 17)	2018	Saif Sporting Club
20	Rashedul Islam Shuvo	(Bangladesh)	CF	10 January 1992 (aged 27)	2018	Rahmatganj MFS
27	Mohamed Didarul Islam	(Bangladesh)	RW/LW	18 April 1989 (aged 30)	2019	Bangladesh Army
28	Tauduzzaman Liton	(Bangladesh)	FW	8 January 1993 (aged 26)	2018	Farashganj SC
99	Nkwocha Kingsley Chigozie	(Nigeria)	CF	18 June 1988 (aged 31)	2019	Mohammedan SC
Left during the season
80	Magalan Ugochukwu Awala	(Nigeria)	CF	20 June 1990 (aged 29)	2018	Muktijoddha Sangsad KC

== Competitions ==
=== Overall record ===
Competition	First match	Last match	Starting round	Final position	Record							
Competition	First match	Last match	Starting round	Final position	Pld	W	D	L	GF	GA	GD	Win %
Premier League	19 January 2019	3 August 2019	Matchday 1	8th	24	5	10	9	22	26	−4	20.83
Federation Cup	27 October 2018	10 November 2018	Group Stage	Quarter-final	3	1	0	2	5	4	+1	33.33
Independence Cup	3 December 2018	12 December 2018	Group Stage	Quarter-final	4	2	1	1	4	2	+2	50.00
Total					31	8	11	12	31	32	−1	25.81

Source: Soccerway

=== Premier League ===
==== League table ====
Pos	Team	Pld	W	D	L	GF	GA	GD	Pts
6	Lt. Sheikh Jamal DC	24	7	7	10	31	37	−6	28
7	Muktijoddha Sangsad KC	24	6	8	10	26	38	−12	26
8	Chittagong Abahani Ltd.	24	5	10	9	22	26	−4	25
9	Dhaka Mohammedan SC Ltd.	24	6	7	11	31	40	−9	25
10	Rahmatganj MFS	24	4	10	10	34	53	−19	22

Source: BFF
Rules for classification: 1) Points; 2) Goal difference; 3) Goals scored.

==== Results summary ====
Overall								Home						Away					
Pld	W	D	L	GF	GA	GD	Pts	W	D	L	GF	GA	GD	W	D	L	GF	GA	GD
24	5	10	9	22	26	−4	25	3	6	3	12	10	+2	2	4	6	10	16	−6

Source: Soccerway

==== Results by round ====
Round	1	2	3	4	5	6	7	8	9	10	11	12	13	14	15	16	17	18	19	20	21	22	23	24	25	26
Ground	H	A	H	A	H	A	H	A	(Note: No Chittagong Abahani matchday in this round.)	H	A	A	A	A	H	A	H	A	H	A	H	(Note: No Chittagong Abahani matchday in this round.)	A	H	H	H
Result	W	D	D	L	W	L	D	D	-	D	L	W	L	W	L	D	L	D	W	L	D	-	L	D	L	D
Position	4	4	6	7	6	7	7	8	8	8	8	7	8	7	6	7	7	7	6	6	7	7	7	7	8	8

Source: Matches
A = Away; H = Home; W = Win; D = Draw; L = Loss; P = Postponed
Notes: Positions show the situation at the end of the corresponding Rounds, not the position at the conclusion of matches or game days.

==== Matches ====
19 January 2019 1	Chittagong Abahani	1–0	Muktijoddha SKC	Dhaka
14:00 BST (UTC+6)	M. Ugochukwu 50'; N. Rasel (yellow card) 45'; M. Lawal (yellow card) 62'; M. Raju (yellow card) 74'	Report	H. Nolak (yellow card) 27'; S. Anik (yellow card) 41'	Stadium: Bangabandhu National Stadium; Referee: Mahmud Zamal Farouqee Nahid

24 January 2019 2	Rahmatganj MFS	1–1	Chittagong Abahani	Dhaka
19:30 BST (UTC+6)	Faysal (yellow card) 55'; M. Sharif (yellow card) 79'; S. Zunapio 80'	Report	F. Morshed (yellow card) 10'; M. Bah 56'; D. Tagoe (yellow card) 89'; N. Rasel (yellow card) 90+1'	Stadium: Bangabandhu National Stadium; Referee: Bharat Chandra Gour

29 January 2019 3	Chittagong Abahani	0–0	Team BJMC	Dhaka
14:30 BST (UTC+6)	M. Alam (yellow card) 27'; D. Tagoe (yellow card) 32'; M. Raju (yellow card) 61'	Report	M. Shapon (yellow card) 29'; S. Illiasu (yellow card) 32'; F. Khasanboyev (yellow card) 45+2'; O. Valizhonov (yellow card) 90+5'	Stadium: Bangabandhu National Stadium; Referee: Bhovon Mohon Talukdar

3 February 2019 4	Arambagh KS	2–0	Chittagong Abahani	Mymensingh
16:00 BST (UTC+6)	Arifur 61'; M. Rokey (yellow card) 67'; P. Biyaga 76'	Report	A. Baidya (yellow card) 82'	Stadium: Rafiq Uddin Bhuiyan Stadium; Referee: Sheik Farid Ahmed

8 February 2019 5	Chittagong Abahani	3–2	Brothers Union	Dhaka
16:00 BST (UTC+6)	S. Shafi 11' (o.g.); M. Bah 46'; Koushik 56', (yellow card) 87'; M. Lawal (yellow card) 63'	Report	L. Lima (yellow card) 19', (goal) 64' (pen.); M. Rabby 33'; K. Tara (yellow card) 68'	Stadium: Bangabandhu National Stadium; Referee: Anisur Rahman

13 February 2019 6	Sheikh Russel KC	1–0	Chittagong Abahani	Sylhet
18:30 BST (UTC+6)	Khalekurzaman 66'; A. Azizov (yellow card) 83'	Report	M. Ugochukwu (yellow card) 80'	Stadium: Sylhet District Stadium; Referee: Mohan Bhaban

18 February 2019 7	Chittagong Abahani	0–0	Dhaka Mohammedan	Dhaka
16:00 BST (UTC+6)		Report	A. Ghosh (yellow card) 42'; A. Bappy (yellow card) 64'; M. Linkon (yellow card) 90'	Stadium: Bangabandhu National Stadium; Referee: Mohan Bhaban

23 February 2019 8	Saif SC	0–0	Chittagong Abahani	Mymensingh
15:00 BST (UTC+6)	A. Bablu (yellow card) 44'; Z. Zia (yellow card) 85'	Report	A. Baidya (yellow card) 71'	Stadium: Rafiq Uddin Bhuiyan Stadium; Referee: Anisur Rahman

4 March 2019 10	Chittagong Abahani	0–0	Sheikh Jamal DC	Dhaka
16:00 BST (UTC+6)		Report		Stadium: Bangabandhu National Stadium; Referee: Mohammed Jalaluddin

8 April 2019 11	Dhaka Abahani	2–0	Chittagong Abahani	Dhaka
16:00 BST (UTC+6)	N. Jibon 10', (yellow card) 14'; S. Chizoba 19'; A. Fahad (yellow card) 48'; W. Faisal (yellow card) 63'	Report	Sohel Mia (yellow card) 85'	Stadium: Bangabandhu National Stadium; Referee: Mohammed Naheed

12 April 2019 12	NoFeL SC	0–3	Chittagong Abahani	Noakhali
15:30 BST (UTC+6)	S. Ullah (yellow card) 43'; Kamrul (yellow card) 45+2'	Report	E. Benjamin 2' (o.g.); M. Ugochukwu 23', 90+6', (yellow card) 23'; M. Raju (yellow card) 70'	Stadium: Shaheed Bulu Stadium; Referee: Bharat Chandra Gour

18 April 2019 13	Bashundhara Kings	3–0	Chittagong Abahani	Nilphamari
15:30 BST (UTC+6)	B. Duyshobekov 45+2'; D. Colindres 78'; M. Vinícius 85'; R. Reza (yellow card) 90+3'	Report	N. Shahed (yellow card) 54'; A. Baidya (yellow card) 57'; D. Tagoe (yellow card) 90+4'	Stadium: Sheikh Kamal Stadium; Referee: Anisur Rahman

9 May 2019 14	Muktijoddha SKC	1–4	Chittagong Abahani	Gopalganj
16:00 BST (UTC+6)	Y. Kato 10'	Report	N. Kingsley 5'; Didarul 25'; M. Bah 68', 71'; Anik (yellow card) 81'	Stadium: Sheikh Fazlul Haque Mani Stadium; Referee: Mohammed Jalaluddin

16 May 2019 15	Chittagong Abahani	1–2	Rahmatganj MFS	Dhaka
19:00 BST (UTC+6)	N. Shahed (yellow card) 6'; N. Kingsley 24' (pen.)	Report	F. Khasanboyev (yellow card) 24'; S. Rana 26', (yellow card) 87'; D. Alam (yellow card) 33'; L. Darboe 70'	Stadium: Bangabandhu National Stadium; Referee: Mahmud Zamal Farouqee Nahid

21 May 2019 16	Team BJMC	1–1	Chittagong Abahani	Noakhali
16:00 BST (UTC+6)	M. Tutul (yellow card) 27'; S. Illiasu 45'; O. Valijonov (yellow card) 56'; A. Kanon (yellow card) 84'; M. Yousuf (yellow card) 88'	Report	M. Bah 84'	Stadium: Shaheed Bulu Stadium; Referee: Bharat Chandra Gour

16 June 2019 17	Chittagong Abahani	0–1	Arambagh KS	Dhaka
16:00 BST (UTC+6)		Report	P. Biyaga (yellow card) 24'; Jalal Miya (yellow card) 44'; M. Chinedu 63'; M. Rockey (yellow card) 89'	Stadium: Bangabandhu National Stadium; Referee: Mahmud Zamal Farouqee Nahid

27 June 2019 18	Brothers Union	1–1	Chittagong Abahani	Dhaka
19:00 BST (UTC+6)	Shakil (yellow card) 19'; M. Shaikh 84'	Report	N. Kingsley 21'; A. Baidya (yellow card) 33'; N. Rasel (yellow card) 90+4'	Stadium: Bangabandhu National Stadium; Referee: Mohamed Mizanur Rahman

2 July 2019 19	Chittagong Abahani	3–0	Sheikh Russel KC	Dhaka
19:00 BST (UTC+6)	M. Bah 9'; Sohel Mia 46', 61'; M. Nehal (yellow card) 59'; N. Rasel (yellow card) 69'	Report	R. Onwrebe (yellow card) 86'	Stadium: Bangabandhu National Stadium; Referee: Sujit Chandan Banarjee

6 July 2019 20	Mohammedan SC	2–0	Chittagong Abahani	Dhaka
19:00 BST (UTC+6)	U. Nagata 66' (pen.); S. Diabate 72'; Pappu (yellow card) 87'	Report	M. Amin (yellow card) 65'	Stadium: Bangabandhu National Stadium; Referee: Sujit Chandan Banarjee

10 July 2019 21	Chittagong Abahani	1–1	Saif SC	Dhaka
16:00 BST (UTC+6)	Sohel Mia 4'; A. Baidya (yellow card) 10'; Anik (yellow card) 45+1'; D. Tagoe (yellow card) 79'	Report	D. Córdoba 25'; A. Celin (yellow card) 29'	Stadium: Bangabandhu National Stadium; Referee: Anisur Rahman

20 July 2019 23	Sheikh Jamal DC	2–0	Chittagong Abahani	Dhaka
16:00 BST (UTC+6)	E. Kanteh 5'; S. Kanform 37'	Report	M. Raju (yellow card) 80'	Stadium: Bangabandhu National Stadium; Referee: Mohammed Jalaluddin

24 July 2019 24	Chittagong Abahani	2–2	Dhaka Abahani	Dhaka
19:00 BST (UTC+6)	Anik (yellow card) 69'; D. Tagoe 75' (pen.); M. Lawal (yellow card) 88'; N. Kingsley 90+1'	Report	Mamun 63'; N. Jibon 80'	Stadium: Bangabandhu National Stadium; Referee: Bhubon Mohon Tarafder

28 July 2019 25	Chittagong Abahani	0–1	NoFeL SC	Dhaka
16:00 BST (UTC+6)		Report	Jamir (yellow card) 43'; F. Mona 50'	Stadium: Bangabandhu National Stadium; Referee: Mohan Bhaban

3 August 2019 26	Chittagong Abahani	1–1	Bashundhara Kings	Dhaka
17:30 BST (UTC+6)	D. Tagoe 45' (pen.); M. Lawal (yellow card) 58'; A. Baidya (yellow card) 88'	Report	M. Vinícius 16', (yellow card) 88'; Hemanta (yellow card) 19'; Nasiruddin (yellow card) 78'	Stadium: Bangabandhu National Stadium; Referee: Mahmud Zamal Farouqee Nahid

=== Federation Cup ===
==== Group stage ====
Pos	Team	Pld	W	D	L	GF	GA	GD	Pts	Qualification
1	Arambagh KS	2	2	0	0	5	3	+2	6	Quarterfinals
2	Chittagong Abahani	2	1	0	1	5	3	+2	3	Quarterfinals
3	Rahmatganj MFS	2	0	0	2	2	6	−4	0	

Source: azscore

27 October 2018 1	Chittagong Abahani	3–1	Rahmatganj MFS	Dhaka
17:00 BST (UTC+6)	M. Bah 35'; M. Awala 72'; M. Lawal 76'	Report	Rakib 57'	Stadium: Bangabandhu National Stadium; Referee: A. Rahman Dhali

4 November 2018 4	Arambagh KS	2–2 (4–2 p)	Chittagong Abahani	Dhaka
17:00 BST (UTC+6)	I. Babakhanov 45+2' (pen.); Shahriar Bappi 85'	Report	M. Awala 8'; M. Bah 29'	Stadium: Bangabandhu National Stadium; Referee: M. Daly
	Penalties
	I. Babakhanov (penalty scored); Rajon (penalty scored); Robiul (penalty scored); J. Sujon (penalty missed); K. Chukwudi (penalty scored)		(penalty missed) M. Lawal; (penalty missed) N. Rasel; (penalty scored) D. Tagoe; (penalty scored) K. Bose
Note: The tiebreaker was conducted to decide group champion.

==== Knockout phase ====
===== Quarter-final =====
10 November 2018 Quarterfinal	Sheikh Russel KC	1–0	Chittagong Abahani	Dhaka
17:00 BST (UTC+6)	R. Odovin 47'	Report		Stadium: Bangabandhu National Stadium; Referee: Sujit Chandan Banarjee

=== Independence Cup ===
==== Group stage ====
Pos	Team	Pld	W	D	L	GF	GA	GD	Pts	Qualification
1	Chittagong Abahani	3	2	1	0	4	0	+4	7	Advance to Quarterfinals
2	Rahmatganj MFS	3	1	1	1	3	1	+2	4	Advance to Quarterfinals
3	NoFeL Sporting Club	3	1	0	2	2	6	−4	3	
4	Dhaka Mohammedan	3	0	2	1	0	2	−2	2	

Source: GSA

3 December 2018 1	Chittagong Abahani	3–0	NoFeL SC	Dhaka
15:00 BST (UTC+6)	M. Bah 19', 61'; M. Lawal 54'	Report		Stadium: Bangabandhu National Stadium; Referee: Jahidul Chowdhury

6 December 2016 2	Rahmatganj MFS	0–1	Chittagong Abahani	Dhaka
15:00 BST (UTC+6)		Report	M. Bah 38'	Stadium: Bangabandhu National Stadium; Referee: Farukh Islam Rana

9 December 2018 3	Dhaka Mohammedan	0–0	Chittagong Abahani	Dhaka
17:15 BST (UTC+6)		Report		Stadium: Bangabandhu National Stadium; Referee: Ashok Chakrabarty

==== Knockout phase ====
===== Quarter-final =====
12 December 2018 Quarterfinal	Chittagong Abahani	0–2	Sheikh Russel KC	Dhaka
16:30 BST (UTC+6)		Report	A. Azizov 35'; R. Odovin 38'	Stadium: Bangabandhu National Stadium; Referee: Narul Islam

== Statistics ==
=== Goalscorers ===
Rank	No.	Nat.	Pos.	Player	BPL	Independence Cup	Federation Cup	Total
1	10	(The Gambia)	FW	Mamadou Bah	6	3	2	11
2	80	(Nigeria)	FW	Magalan Ugochukwu	3	0	2	5
3	99	(Nigeria)	FW	Nkwocha Kingsley Chigozie	4	0	0	4
4	9	(Bangladesh)	FW	Sohel Miah	3	0	0	3
5	4	(Kyrgyzstan)	DF	Daniel Tagoe	2	0	0	2
5	25	(Nigeria)	DF	Mufta Lawal	0	1	1	2
7	12	(Bangladesh)	MF	Koushik Barua	1	0	0	1
7	27	(Bangladesh)	FW	Didarul Islam	1	0	0	1
Own goals (from the opponents)					2	0	0	2
Total					22	4	5	31
