= Mohamed Sohel Rana (footballer, born 1996) =

Bangladeshi footballer

Sohel Rana
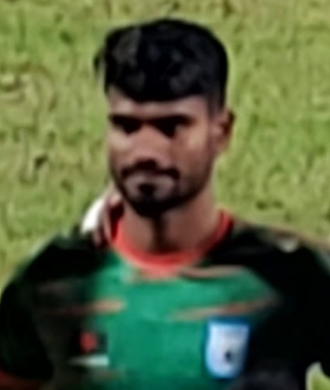
- Sohel with Bangladesh in 2023

Personal information
- Full name: Mohamed Sohel Rana
- Date of birth: 1 June 1996 (age 30)
- Place of birth: Comilla, Bangladesh
- Height: 1.76 m (5 ft 9 in)
- Position: Midfielder

Team information
- Current team: Mohammedan
- Number: 6

Senior career*
Years	Team	Apps	(Gls)
2015–2018	Bangladesh Army	0	(0)
2018–2019	Rahmatganj	19	(4)
2019–2022	Chittagong Abahani	38	(1)
2022–2023	Dhaka Abahani	15	(1)
2023–2026	Bashundhara Kings	39	(4)
2026–	Mohammedan	0	(0)

International career^{‡}
2022–	Bangladesh	24	(0)
- * Club domestic league appearances and goals as of 6 June 2026 ‡ National team caps and goals as of 28 September 2026

Mohamed Sohel Rana (Bengali: মোহাম্মদ সোহেল রানা; born 1 June 1996), also known as Shohel Rana, is a Bangladeshi professional footballer who plays for Bangladesh Premier League club Mohammedan and the Bangladesh national team. As a versatile midfielder, he can operate either as a defensive midfielder, central midfielder, attacking midfielder or wide midfielder.

== Club career ==
=== Early years ===
When Sohel was third-grader in 2005, his father provided him Tk 350 to buy a pair of football boots, even though his family was going through a financial crisis at the time. Nonetheless, the investment did not go to vain as, Sohel went onto play the Danone Nations Cup (U-13) tournament and the Bangabandhu Gold Cup primary school football tournament. In 2014, Sohel guided his school, Bibir Bazar High School from Comilla, as they won the National School Football Championship.

However, poverty drove him to a job in the Bangladesh Army. He finished as the highest scorer in the inter-service football competition as, Bangladesh Army became champions by beating a star studded Bangladesh Navy team, which included national team duo Mamunul Islam and Raihan Hasan. After the tournament ended, Rahmatganj MFS coach Golam Jilani, who had seen Sohel play before finally made a decision to sign him for the upcoming 2018–19 Bangladesh Premier League season. This gave Sohel a chance to play in the country's top-tier without having to play the lower division leagues, making up for his late entry into professional football.

=== Rahmatganj MFS ===
On 1 July 2018, Sohel joined Rahmatganj MFS and made his professional league debut by playing full 90 minutes against Dhaka Abahani, on 2 February 2019. During his debut, Sohel registered an assist as his team lost the game 5–1. Although Sohel spent most of his career at the Bangladesh army as a forward, under coach Golam Jilani, Sohel played as a winger or a central midfielder supplying passes to the clubs Congolese talisman Siyo Zunapio, who scored 13 league goals that year, with all three assists Sohel provided the entire season being for the striker.

On 19 February 2019, Sohel scored his maiden professional league goal during a 2–2 against Muktijoddha Sangsad. He scored his second goal for the club during a surprise 2–1 against giants Chittagong Abahani, on 16 May 2019. However, Sohel's next couple of goals came during defeats at the hands of NoFeL SC and Arambagh KS respectively. Sohel ended his first year in professional football with an impressive 4 goals and 3 assists to him name.

=== Chittagong Abahani ===
On 1 October 2019, Sohel joined Chittagong Abahani under the guidance of the country's first UEFA-A licensed coach, Maruful Haque. Sohel's first assignment at his new club was the 2019 Sheikh Kamal International Club Cup, where he played all five games as defending champions Abahani reached the final once more, defeating Gokulam Kerala from India 3–2, with Sohel assisting the winner from Chinedu Matthew. However, he was unable to win his first silverware with the club as, they were defeated by Malaysian side Terengganu FC in the final. Sohel was unable to make his league debut that season as, the 2019–20 Bangladesh Premier League was cancelled.

On 18 January 2021, Sohel finally made his league debut for Chittagong Abahani, during a game against Sheikh Jamal Dhanmondi Club. Nevertheless, he was not able to find a regular place in the starting lineup during the course of the season, this led to Maruful Haque converting Sohel into a defensive midfielder, the following year. The 2021–22 campaign was Sohel's breakthrough season as, he was called up to the Bangladesh national football team by coach Javier Cabrera, after his impressive performances during the domestic cup and league. On 4 March 2022, Sohel scored his first league goal for Chittagong Abahani which also came against Muktijoddha Sangsad. He finished the season with 21 league appearances, registering one goal and four assists. Sohel missed only a single game the entire season due to a suspension and was shown a red card in his last game for the club, on 1 August 2022, against Bangladesh Police. He made 51 appearances in all competitions for the club and managed get seven assist and a single goal during his three years stay.

=== Dhaka Abahani ===
On 5 August 2022, Sohel joined Dhaka Abahani, after his contract with the Chittagong-based club expired. On 15 November 2022, Sohel made his debut for the club in a 2–0 victory against Uttara FC during the 2022 Independence Cup. On 24 December 2022, he was sent off during a 1–2 victory over Rahmatganj MFS, in what was only his second league appearance for the club. Sohel scored his first goal for the team in a 4–1 victory against Bangladesh Police. In July 2023, Sohel joined Bashundhara Kings on a pre-contract deal. His last appearance for the club was as a substitute during a 1–3 defeat to Mohun Bagan in the 2023–24 AFC Cup qualifying play-offs.

=== Bashundhara Kings ===
On 10 September 2023, Sohel had his first training session with Bashundhara Kings. On 2 October 2023, he made his debut for the club by coming on as an 82nd-minute substitute against Odisha FC in the 2023–24 AFC Cup. On 15 December 2023, Sohel scored his first goal for Bashundhara in a 4–0 victory over his former club, Dhaka Abahani, during the semi-finals of the 2023–24 Independence Cup.

=== Mohammedan ===
Sohel joined Mohammedan in 2026.

== International career ==
On 14 May 2022, Sohel was called up to the Bangladesh national team preliminary squad for the then upcoming 2023 AFC Asian Cup qualification – third round. However, due to passport complications Sohel was not able to join the final 23-man squad.

On 22 September 2022, Sohel made his debut for the Bangladesh national team in a friendly match against Cambodia, by replacing Jamal Bhuyan at the start of the second half. On 13 June 2023, Sohel scored the lone goal against Tiffy Army during a behind closed doors friendly match in Phnom Penh.

He was also included in the final 23-man squad for the 2023 SAFF Championship, in India. On 17 October 2023, he was sent off during a 2–1 victory over Maldives in the 2026 FIFA World Cup qualification – AFC first round. The suspension would cause him to miss the away fixture against Australia, the first match of the second round.

== Career statistics ==
=== Club ===
As of 29 May 2024.

Appearances and goals by club, season and competition
Club	Season	League			Domestic Cup (Note: Appearance(s) in Bangladesh Federation Cup)		Other		Continental		Total	
Club	Season	Division	Apps	Goals	Apps	Goals	Apps	Goals	Apps	Goals	Apps	Goals
Rahmatganj	2018–19	BFL	19	4	0	0	0	0	—		19	4
Chittagong Abahani	2019–20	BFL	0	0	0	0	5 (Note: Appearance(s) in Sheikh Kamal International Club Cup)	0	—		5	0
Chittagong Abahani	2020–21	BFL	17	0	3	0	—		—		20	0
Chittagong Abahani	2021–22	BFL	21	1	2	0	3 (Note: Appearance(s) in Bangladesh Independence Cup)	0	—		26	1
Chittagong Abahani	Total		38	1	5	0	8	0	0	0	51	1
Dhaka Abahani	2022–23	BFL	15	1	5	0	5	0	—		25	1
Dhaka Abahani	2023–24	BFL	0	0	0	0	0	0	2 (Note: Appearance(s) in AFC Cup)	0	2	0
Dhaka Abahani	Total		15	1	5	0	5	0	2	0	27	1
Bashundhara Kings	2023–24	BFL	10	0	4	0	5	1	2	0	21	1
Career total			82	6	14	0	18	1	4	0	118	7

=== International ===
As of 28 September 2026.

Bangladesh national team
Year	Apps	Goals
2022	1	0
2023	12	0
2024	5	0
2025	4	0
2026	2	0
Total	24	0

== Honours ==
Bashundhara Kings

- Bangladesh Premier League: 2023–24
- Independence Cup: 2023–24
