= Jozef Pavlík =

Slovak footballer

Personal information
- Full name: Jozef Pavlík
- Date of birth: 12 July 1973 (age 53)
- Place of birth: Považská Bystrica, Czechoslovakia
- Position: Midfielder

Senior career*
Years	Team	Apps	(Gls)
–1996	Inter Bratislava		
1996–1998	Spartak Trnava		
1998–2002	Panserraikos		
1999–2000	→ Spartak Trnava		
2002–2003	Ethnikos Asteras		
2003–2004	Kremser SC		
2004–2005	Mistelbach		

Managerial career
- 2008: Olympiacos Volos (assistant)
- 2010–2011: Iraklis (assistant)
- 2012: Iraklis (assistant)
- 2012–2014: Nitra (assistant)
- 2014: Al Ahly Benghazi (assistant)
- 2015–2016: ViOn Zlaté Moravce (assistant)
- 2016: Chittagong Abahani
- 2019: Nitra (U14)
- 2019–2021: Pohronie (assistant)
- * Club domestic league appearances and goals

Jozef Pavlík (born 12 July 1973) is a retired Slovak football midfielder.

== Biography ==
Jozef Pavlík was born on 12 July 1973 in Považská Bystrica.

Pavlík used to play for Kremser SC. After the end of his playing career, he became a manager. He last served as the assistant to Mikuláš Radványi and Jan Kameník at Pohronie.

== Honours ==
=== Managerial ===
Chittagong Abahani

  - Independence Cup: 2016
