= Nasirul Islam Nasir =

Bangladeshi footballer

Personal information
- Full name: Mohammad Nasirul Islam Nasir
- Date of birth: 10 August 1988 (age 38)
- Place of birth: Chapai Nawabganj, Bangladesh
- Height: 1.65 m (5 ft 5 in)
- Position: Right-back

Senior career*
Years	Team	Apps	(Gls)
2002–2003	Dilkusha SC		
2004–2005	Jatrabari KC		
2005–2007	Badda Jagoroni		
2007–2010	Mohammedan SC		
2010–2011	Sheikh Jamal DC		
2011–2013	Mohammedan SC		
2013–2015	Dhaka Abahani		
2016	Sheikh Russel KC		(1)
2017–2018	Mohammedan SC	19	(1)
2018–2019	Saif SC	20	(0)
2019–2021	Chittagong Abahani	25	(1)
2021–2022	Saif SC	12	(0)
2022–2023	Sheikh Jamal DC	5	(0)

International career
2003–2004	Bangladesh U17	5	(0)
2010	Bangladesh U23	3	(0)
2009–2016	Bangladesh	34	(0)
Medal record
Representing Bangladesh
South Asian Games
Gold medal – first place	2010
- * Club domestic league appearances and goals as of 21 July 2023

Nasirul Islam Nasir (Bengali: নাসিরুল ইসলাম নাসির; born 10 August 1988) is a retired Bangladeshi professional footballer who plays as a right-back. He last played for Sheikh Jamal Dhanmondi Club in the Bangladesh Premier League. He played for the Bangladesh national team from 2009 to 2016.

== International career ==
In 2003, Nasir played both legs as Bangladesh U17 defeated Kyrgyzstan 3–0 to qualify for the 2004 AFC U-17 Championship. In the main tournament, coach Shahidur Rahman Shantoo played him in all three games as Bangladesh crashed out of the tournament bottom of their group.

Nasir represented the Bangladesh U-23 team. On 8 November 2010, he made his international debut for the Bangladesh U-23 team in the match against Uzbekistan U-23 team at the 2010 Asian Games. He has participated in 3 matches for the age group of Bangladesh.

On 26 April 2009, a 20 year old Nasir made his international debut for Bangladesh, during the group stages of the 2010 AFC Challenge Cup qualifiers, against Cambodia. He was included in the starting XI of that match. Bangladesh won the match 1–0. In his debut year for Bangladesh, Nasir played a total of 5 matches.

After a 5-year absence from the national team, Nasir was recalled by interim Óscar Bruzón, in 2021, for the 2021 SAFF Championship. However, Nasir failed to make the final squad for the tournament.

== Honours ==
Jatrabari KC

- Dhaka Second Division League: 2004–05

Mohammedan SC

- Federation Cup: 2008, 2009
- Super Cup: 2009

Sheikh Jamal Dhanmondi Club

- Bangladesh Premier League: 2010–11

Bangladesh U-23

- South Asian Games Gold medal: 2010
