= Didier Brossou =

Ivorian footballer

Personal information
- Full name: Kpehi Jean-Charles Didier Brossou
- Date of birth: 23 December 1989 (age 36)
- Place of birth: Abobo, Ivory Coast
- Height: 1.83 m (6 ft 0 in)
- Position: Midfielder

Team information
- Current team: Brothers Union
- Number: 20

Senior career*
Years	Team	Apps	(Gls)
- ASEC Mimosas
2013–2016	Hapoel Ramat Gan	91	(23)
2016–2018	Hapoel Ironi Kiryat Shmona	46	(1)
2018–2019	Maccabi Petah Tikva	16	(0)
2019–2021	Chittagong Abahani	22	(6)
2022–2023	Sheikh Russel KC	30	(8)
2023–2025	Bashundhara Kings	1	(0)
2025	Dempo SC	10	(2)
2025–	Brothers Union	0	(0)
- * Club domestic league appearances and goals as of 22 July 2023

Kpehi Jean Charles Didier Brossou (born 23 December 1989), simply known as Didier Brossou, is an Ivorian professional footballer who plays for Bangladesh Football League club Brothers Union as a central midfielder.

== Honours ==
ASEC Mimosas

- Ligue 1: 2010

Hapoel Ironi Kiryat Shmona

- Toto Cup Al runner-up: 2016–17

Sheikh Russel

- Independence Cup runner-up: 2022–23

Bashundhara Kings

- Bangladesh Football League: 2023–24
- Independence Cup: 2023–24
