= Kesto Kumar Bose =

Bangladeshi footballer

Personal information
- Full name: Kesto Kumar Bose
- Date of birth: 16 April 1992 (age 34)
- Place of birth: Kushtia, Bangladesh
- Height: 1.78 m (5 ft 10 in)
- Position: Centre back

Senior career*
| Years | Team | Apps | (Gls) |
| 2011–2012 | Victoria | | |
| 2012–2013 | BJMC | | |
| 2013–2017 | Sheikh Jamal | | |
| 2017–2018 | Dhaka Abahani | 0 | (0) |
| 2018–2019 | Sheikh Jamal | 11 | (0) |
| 2019 | Chittagong Abahani | 11 | (0) |
| 2019–2021 | Sheikh Jamal | 14 | (0) |
| 2021–2022 | Bashundhara Kings | 4 | (0) |
| 2022–2023 | Muktijoddha | 0 | (0) |

International career^{‡}
| 2014 | Bangladesh U23 | | |
| 2013–2015 | Bangladesh | 3 | (0) |
- * Club domestic league appearances and goals as of 7 May 2022 ‡ National team caps and goals as of 12 November 2015

Kesto Kumar Bose (Bengali: কাস্তো কুমার বসু; born 16 April 1992) is a retired Bangladeshi professional footballer who played as a center-back.
