= Shakhawat Hossain Rony =

Bangladeshi footballer

Sakhawat Hosen Rony
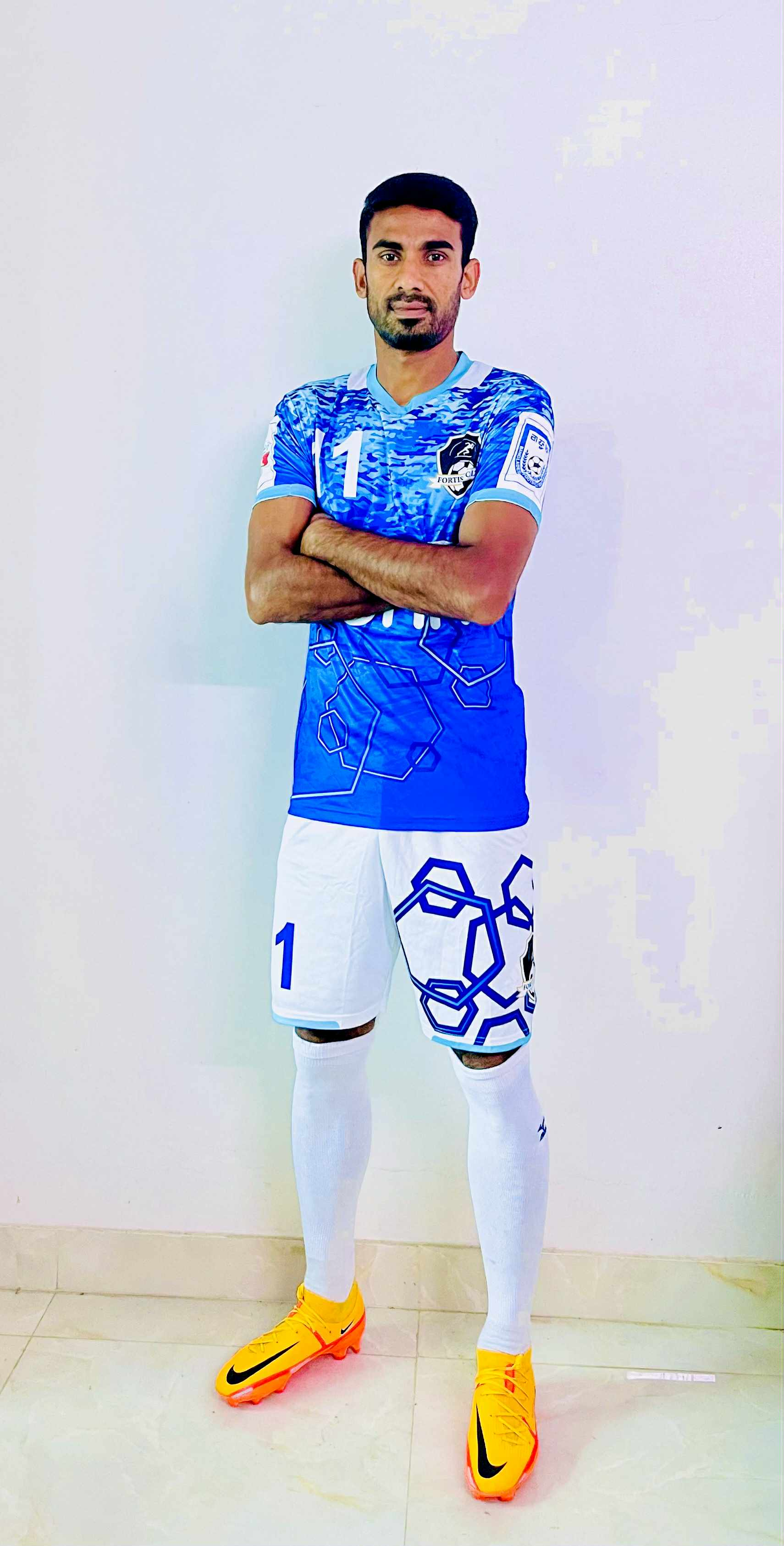

Personal information
- Full name: Md Sakhawat Hosen Rony
- Date of birth: 8 October 1991 (age 35)
- Place of birth: Chittagong, Bangladesh
- Height: 1.78 m (5 ft 10 in)
- Position: Forward

Team information
- Current team: Fortis
- Number: 11

Senior career*
Years	Team	Apps	(Gls)
2005–2006	Kadamtola Sangsad	?	(?)
2007–2008	Fakirerpool YMC	?	(?)
2008–2009	Chittagong Abahani	20	(8)
2009–2010	Sheikh Russel KC	?	(12)
2010–2013	Dhaka Abahani	?	(15)
2013–2015	Sheikh Jamal DC	?	(4)
2016–2017	Sheikh Russel KC	?	(5)
2017–2018	Chittagong Abahani	7	(0)
2018–2019	Sheikh Jamal DC	23	(5)
2019–2022	Chittagong Abahani	27	(5)
2022–	Fortis	21	(4)

International career^{‡}
2011–2018	Bangladesh	20	(8)
- * Club domestic league appearances and goals as of 29 May 2025 ‡ National team caps and goals as of 8 October 2018

Sakhawat Hosen Rony (Bengali: সাখাওয়াত হোসেন রনি) is a Bangladeshi professional footballer who plays for Bangladesh Football League club Fortis. He usually plays as a striker, but can also operate as right winger or false nine. He has also represented the Bangladesh national team from 2011 to 2018.

== Club career ==
In 2003, Rony participated in the Rangunia Inter-Upazila football tournament and the following year played in the under-16 DFA Cup. In 2005, he represented Kadamtola Sangsad in the Second Division League of Dhaka. Rony won the Senior Division League with Fakirerpool Young Men's Club in the 2007–08 season. He made his professional league debut with his hometown club, Chittagong Abahani during the 2008–09 B.League and scored 8 goals.

== International career ==
On 21 March 2011, Rony made his international debut against Palestine during 2011 AFC Asian Cup qualifiers. On 2 March 2013, he scored his first goal for the national team against Nepal during 2014 AFC Asian Cup qualifiers. He also scored a brace against Bhutan in 2015 SAFF Championship.

== Career statistics ==
=== International ===
==== Olympic team ====
Scores and results list Bangladesh U23's goal tally first.

#	Date	Venue	Opponent	Score	Result	Competition
1.	18 July 2018	Al-Mesaimeer Training Academy Ground, Mesaimeer	(Qatar) Al-Mesaimeer SC	1–1	1–1	Unofficial Friendly

==== Senior team ====
Bangladesh
Year	Apps	Goals
2011	1	0
2012	1	0
2013	4	3
2015	6	3
2016	5	2
2018	3	0
Total	20	8

Scores and results list Bangladesh's goal tally first.

#	Date	Venue	Opponent	Score	Result	Competition
1.	2 March 2013	Dasarath Rangasala Stadium, Kathmandu	Nepal	1–0	2–0	2014 AFC Challenge Cup qualification
2.	2 March 2013	Dasarath Rangasala Stadium, Kathmandu	Nepal	2–0	2–0	2014 AFC Challenge Cup qualification
3.	4 March 2013	Dasarath Rangasala Stadium, Kathmandu	Northern Mariana Islands	2–0	4–0	2014 AFC Challenge Cup qualification
4.	17 December 2015	Bangabandhu National Stadium, Dhaka	Nepal	1–0	1–0	International Friendly
5.	December 2015	Trivandrum International Stadium, Thiruvananthapuram	Bhutan	2–0	3–0	2015 SAFF Championship
6.	December 2015	Trivandrum International Stadium, Thiruvananthapuram	Bhutan	3–0	3–0	2015 SAFF Championship
7.	8 January 2016	Shamsul Huda Stadium, Jessore	Sri Lanka	1–0	4–2	2016 Bangabandhu Cup
8.	8 January 2016	Shamsul Huda Stadium, Jessore	Sri Lanka	4–2	4–2	2016 Bangabandhu Cup

=== Club ===
Abahani Limited Dhaka

#	Date	Venue	Opponent	Score	Result	Competition
1.	25 May 2011	Olympic Stadium (Phnom Penh)	(Sri Lanka) Don Bosco SC	1–1	4–1	AFC President's Cup 2011

Lt. Sheik Jamal Dhanmondi Club Ltd.

#	Date	Venue	Opponent	Score	Result	Competition
1.	29 November 2014	Changlimithang Stadium	(Nepal) Manang Marshyangdi	1–1	2–1	2014 King's Cup (Bhutan)
2.	13 August 2015	Dolen Omurzakov Stadium, Bishkek	(Macau) Casa Benfica	3–1	4–1	2016 AFC Cup qualifying round
3.	13 August 2015	Dolen Omurzakov Stadium, Bishkek	(Macau) Casa Benfica	4–1	4–1	2016 AFC Cup qualifying round

Sheikh Russel KC

#	Date	Venue	Opponent	Score	Result	Competition
1.	25 August 2016	Changlimithang Stadium	(Bhutan) F.C. Tertons	2–4	3–4	2017 AFC Cup qualifying round

== Honours ==
Fakirerpool YMC

- Dhaka Senior Division League: 2007–08

Abahani Limited Dhaka

- Bangladesh Premier League: 2011–12
- Federation Cup (2011)
- Super Cup (2012)

Lt. Sheikh Jamal Dhanmondi Club Ltd.

- Bangladesh Premier League: 2013–14, 2014–15
- Federation Cup: 2013–14, 2014–15
- King's Cup (Bhutan): 2014
