= 2016 Independence Cup (Bangladesh) =

Tournament details
- Country: Bangladesh
- Dates: 1 April - 7 May 2016
- Teams: 12

Final positions
- Champions: Chittagong Abahani (1st title)
- Runners-up: Dhaka Abahani

Tournament statistics
- Matches played: 33
- Goals scored: 91 (2.76 per match)
- Top goal scorer(s): (6 goals) (Bangladesh) Eleta Kingsley (Nigeria) Sunday Chizoba

Awards
- Best player: (Haiti) Leonel Saint-Preux
- All statistics correct as of 27 March 2018.

The 2016 Independence Cup also known as KFC Independence Cup due to the sponsorship from KFC is the 9th edition of the tournament. A total of 12 teams completing in this tournament. Dhaka Mohammedan was the winner of previous edition of the tournament.

== Venues ==
Dhaka
Bangabandhu National Stadium
Capacity: 36,000
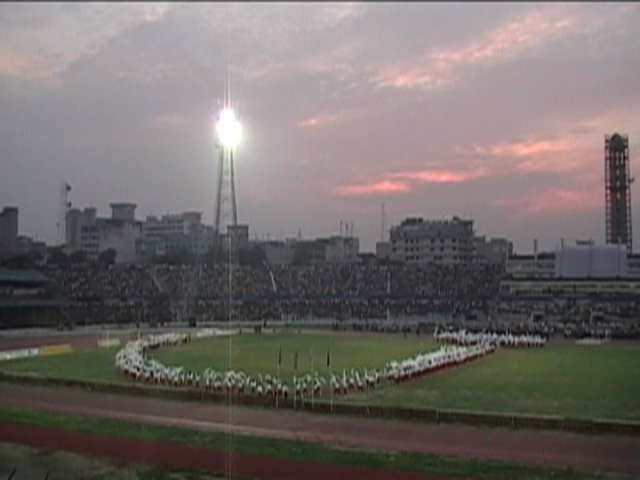

== Group stage ==
The twelve participants were divided into two groups. The top two teams for each group qualified for the semifinals.

=== Group A ===
Team	Pld	W	D	L	GF	GA	GD	Pts
Sheikh Jamal Dhanmondi Club	5	4	1	0	12	2	+10	13
Chittagong Abahani	5	3	1	1	9	7	+2	10
Muktijoddha Sangsad KC	5	3	0	2	7	6	+1	9
Dhaka Mohammedan	5	2	0	3	10	8	+2	6
Brothers Union	5	2	0	3	5	11	−6	6
Uttar Baridhara SC	5	0	0	5	1	10	−9	0

2 April 2016
18:30

Brothers Union	2-0	Uttar Baridhara SC
Mezbah Uddin 34'; Nkwocha Kingsley 84'	Report

Bangabandhu National Stadium
4 April 2016
18:30

Sheikh Jamal Dhanmondi Club	2-0	Dhaka Mohammedan
Enamul Haque 9'; Wedson Anselme 16'

Bangabandhu National Stadium
5 April 2016
18:30

Muktijoddha Sangsad KC	0-2	Chittagong Abahani
		Tarik El Janaby 31' (pen.); Fabrice Noel 76'

Bangabandhu National Stadium
6 April 2016
18:30

Sheikh Jamal Dhanmondi Club	5-0	Brothers Union
Wedson Anselme 21', 72', 84'; Emeka Onuoha 24', 75'

Bangabandhu National Stadium
7 April 2016
18:30

Dhaka Mohammedan	2-0	Uttar Baridhara SC
Masuk Mia Jony 11'; Ismael Bangoura 90+4'

Bangabandhu National Stadium
9 April 2016
16:00

Uttar Baridhara SC	0-1	Sheikh Jamal Dhanmondi Club
		Monir Alam 20' (o.g.)

Bangabandhu National Stadium
10 April 2016
18:30

Brothers Union	0-1	Muktijoddha Sangsad KC
		Kolo Musa 40'

Bangabandhu National Stadium
11 April 2016
17:00

Chittagong Abahani	2-1	Uttar Baridhara SC
Zahid Hossain 49'; Fabrice Noel 65'		Sobuj 89'

Bangabandhu National Stadium
12 April 2016
17:00

Dhaka Mohammedan	1-2	Muktijoddha Sangsad KC
Ismael Bangoura 90+2'		Landry Pouemi 73'(o.g.); Kolo Musa 82'

Bangabandhu National Stadium
13 April 2016
17:00

Brothers Union	0-3	Chittagong Abahani
		Leonel Saint-Preux 30', 55'; Zahid Hossain 77'(pen.)

Bangabandhu National Stadium
15 April 2016
17:00

Muktijoddha Sangsad KC	3-0	Uttar Baridhara SC
Kolo Musa 17', 34', 55'

Bangabandhu National Stadium
17 April 2016
19:15

Dhaka Mohammedan	5-1	Chittagong Abahani
Ismael Bangoura 21', 50'; Biplu Ahmed 32'; Masuk Mia Jony 60'; Yousuf Sifat		Zahid Hossain 36' (pen.)

Bangabandhu National Stadium
19 April 2016
17:30

Sheikh Jamal Dhanmondi Club	3-1	Muktijoddha Sangsad KC
Emeka Onuoha 13'; Landing Darboe 43'; Wedson Anselme 45+1'		Mobarak Hossain (pen.)

Bangabandhu National Stadium
21 April 2016
17:30

Dhaka Mohammedan	2-3	Brothers Union
Tawhidul Alam Sabuz 54'; Biplu Ahmed 66'		Mannaf Rabbi 51', 52'; Awudu Ibrahim 75'

Bangabandhu National Stadium
22 April 2016
17:30

Sheikh Jamal Dhanmondi Club	1-1	Chittagong Abahani
Emeka Onuoha 19'(pen.)		Alison Udoka 74'

Bangabandhu National Stadium

=== Group B ===
Team	Pld	W	D	L	GF	GA	GD	Pts
Sheikh Russel KC	5	3	1	1	7	5	+2	10
Dhaka Abahani	5	2	3	0	9	3	+6	9
Team BJMC	5	2	1	2	9	8	+1	7
Rahmatganj MFS	5	1	2	2	6	7	−1	5
Sheikh Moni Arambagh KS	5	0	4	1	2	3	−1	4
Feni Soccer Club	5	0	3	2	4	11	−7	3

1 April 2016
16:30

Team BJMC	1-0	Rahmatganj MFS
Eleta Kingsley 39'	Report

Bangabandhu National Stadium
3 April 2016
18:30

Dhaka Abahani	1-1	Feni Soccer Club
Camara Sarba 45+1'		Choumrin Rakhine 84' (pen.)

Bangabandhu National Stadium
5 April 2016
16:00

Sheikh Russel KC	2-1	Sheikh Moni Arambagh KS
Fikru Teferra 4'; Paul Emile Biyaga 82'		Kester Akon 2'

Bangabandhu National Stadium
6 April 2016
16:00

Feni Soccer Club	2-3	Rahmatganj MFS
Thuam Frank 11', 90+5'		Sohel Mia 25'; Zunapio Siyo 66', 72'

Bangabandhu National Stadium
7 April 2016
16:00

Sheikh Russel KC	3-2	Team BJMC
Fikru Teferra 4(pen.)', 11', 76'		Mehedi Hossein Tapu 7'; Samson Iliasu 83'

Bangabandhu National Stadium
9 April 2016
18:30

Dhaka Abahani	5-0	Team BJMC
Lee Tuck 23'; Camara Sarba 28', 67'; Sunday Chizoba 84', 89'

Bangabandhu National Stadium
10 April 2016
16:00

Feni Soccer Club	1-1	Sheikh Moni Arambagh KS
Iqbal Hossain Bhuiyan 65'		Mohammad Abdullah 59'

Bangabandhu National Stadium
11 April 2016
19:15

Sheikh Russel KC	2-1	Rahmatganj MFS
Fikru Teferra 5'; Paul Emile Biyaga 15'		Syed Rashed Turzo 85'

Bangabandhu National Stadium
12 April 2016
19:15

Team BJMC	0-0	Sheikh Moni Arambagh KS

Bangabandhu National Stadium
13 April 2016
19:15

Sheikh Russel KC	0-0	Feni Soccer Club

Bangabandhu National Stadium
15 April 2016
19:15

Rahmatganj MFS	0-0	Sheikh Moni Arambagh KS

Bangabandhu National Stadium
17 April 2016
17:00

Dhaka Abahani	0-0	Sheikh Moni Arambagh KS

Bangabandhu National Stadium
18 April 2016
17:30

Team BJMC	6-0	Feni Soccer Club
Eleta Kingsley 36', 38', 45', 50', 73'; Samson Iliasu 87'

Bangabandhu National Stadium
20 April 2016
17:30

Dhaka Abahani	2-2	Rahmatganj MFS
Rohan Ricketts 7'; Camara Sarba 85'		Zunapio Siyo 38'; Nurul Absar 71'

Bangabandhu National Stadium
23 April 2016
17:30

Dhaka Abahani	1-0	Sheikh Russel KC
Jewel Rana 72'

Bangabandhu National Stadium

== Knockout stage ==
Semi-finals
3 May
Sheikh Jamal DC	0
Dhaka Abahani	6
4 May
Chittagong Abahani	1(4)
Sheikh Russel KC	1(2)

Final
7 May
Dhaka Abahani	0
Chittagong Abahani	2

=== Semi Final 1 ===
3 May 2016
17:30

Sheikh Jamal Dhanmondi Club	0-6	Dhaka Abahani
		Lee Tuck 48(pen.)', 50'; Sunday Chizoba 60', 64', 81', 83'

Bangabandhu National Stadium

=== Semi Final 2 ===
4 May 2016
17:30

Chittagong Abahani	1-1 (a.e.t.)	Sheikh Russel KC
Rubel Miya 66'		Fikru Teferra 45+2'
Penalties
Tarik El Janaby (penalty scored); Alison Udoka (penalty scored); Leonel Saint-Preux (penalty scored); Zahid Hossain (penalty scored)	4–2	(penalty scored) Fikru Teferra; (penalty scored) Valery Nahayo; (penalty missed) Mithun Chowdhury; (penalty missed) Shahedul Alam Shahed

Bangabandhu National Stadium

=== Final ===
7 May 2016
17:30

Dhaka Abahani	0-2	Chittagong Abahani
		Leonel Saint-Preux 55'; Rubel Miya 62'

Bangabandhu National Stadium
Referee: Azad Rahman

== Top scorers ==
No.	Name	Club	Goals
1.	(Nigeria) Sunday Chizoba	Dhaka Abahani	6
2.	(Ethiopia) Fikru Teferra	Sheikh Russel KC	6
3.	(Nigeria) Eleta Kingsley	Team BJMC	6
4.	(Haiti) Wedson Anselme	Sheikh Jamal Dhanmondi Club	5
5.	(Nigeria) Kolo Musa	Muktijoddha Sangsad KC	5
