= Maruful Haque =

Bangladeshi association football player and manager

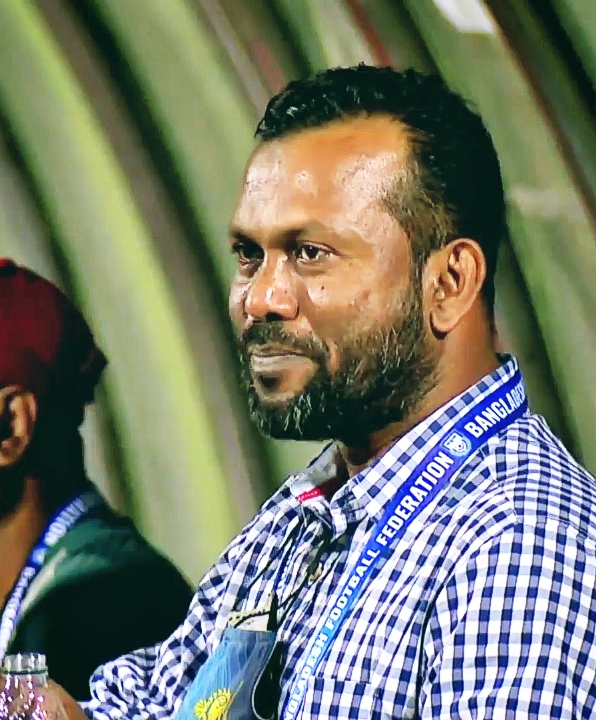
- Maruful with Chittagong Abahani in 2021

Personal information
- Full name: A.K.M. Maruful Haque
- Date of birth: 19 September 1969 (age 57)
- Place of birth: Mymensingh, East Pakistan (present-day Bangladesh)
- Position: Defensive midfielder

Team information
- Current team: Dhaka Abahani (head coach)

Managerial career
- Years: Team
- 2008–2010: Mohammedan SC
- 2010–2011: Muktijoddha Sangsad
- 2011–2014: Sheikh Russel KC
- 2014–2015: Sheikh Jamal DC
- 2015: Sheikh Russel KC
- 2015–2016: Bangladesh
- 2017–2019: Arambagh KS
- 2019–2022: Chittagong Abahani
- 2021: Bangladesh U23 (interim)
- 2022–2023: Sheikh Jamal DC
- 2023–2024: Chittagong Abahani (technical advisor)
- 2024: Bangladesh U20
- 2024–: Dhaka Abahani
Medal record
Men's football
Representing Bangladesh (As a Manager)
SAFF U-20 Championship
Winner	2024 Nepal	Team

Maruful Haque (Bengali: মারুফুল হক) is a Bangladeshi professional football coach and former player, who is currently serving as the head coach of Bangladesh Football League club Abahani Limited Dhaka.

He is the first-ever South Asian to get a UEFA A license in 2015. He is also one of the first Bangladeshi coaches to obtain AFC Pro-Diploma.

== Early stage ==
Maruful's roots lie in Gafargaon Upzila of Mymensingh. He had interests in all kinds of sports in his youth. He played 1st division kabaddi with Zurine Janata Club. He had an offer from 1st division basketball club Dhaka Panthers. Sonali Bank wanted him on its hockey team and BJMC pursued him for athletics and 400 meters javelin. However, he chose football for his professional career. Maruful played in Dhaka Premier League for Bangladesh Boys Club in 1992–1994. He was called up for the preliminary squad of the Bangladesh U19 team. He regularly featured for his Zilla football team. He completed his degree from Mymensingh Ananda Mohan College. He earned a BPED from Dhaka Physical Education College in 1993. A year later, Bangladesh University of Engineering and Technology (BUET) hired him as its physical instructor.

== Coaching career ==
Maruful Haque started his coaching career with Mymensingh Mohammedan in 1995 as a coach-cum-player. Eventually, he took part in a five-day coaching course organized by FIFA. Impressed with Maruful's ability, German coach Walter Fizy asked Bangladesh's legendary coach Abdur Rahim to motivate Maruful to gain higher coaching licenses. He went on to become the assistant coach of Badda Jagoroni Sangsad in 2001. Under his assistance, Badda Jagoroni became runners-up of the First Division in both 2001 and 2004–05. In the meantime, he also coached different sections of the Bangladesh Army Football Team. He began his professional career as a game and sports instructor in the Physical Education Department of BUET in August 1994, where he has been coaching and organizing sports. He also served as the assistant director of the department.

=== Mohammedan SC ===
Maruful got his big break in 2008 when Mohammedan SC team management appointed him as the head coach of the traditional giant. Maruful caught their attention during the Victory Day Football Tournament, organized by the club, where Maruful's Badda reached the semis and also defeated Dhaka Abahani in the group-stages. He led the club to the Federation Cup title in both 2008 and 2009. His biggest achievement during his tenure at the club was the triumph in the 2009 Super Cup. Although, he resigned a month before the 2009–10 season concluded, Mohammedan finished the season as unbeaten runners-up.

=== Muktijoddha Sangsad ===
In August 2010, he joined another giant of Bangladesh football, Muktijoddha Sangsad KS. Under his guidance the Freedom Fighters finished runners-up in the 2010–11 Bangladesh League, finishing the season only a point behind champions Sheikh Jamal Dhanmondi Club, in what was his only season with the club.

=== Sheikh Russel KC ===
In 2011, he joined Sheikh Russel KC. The 2011–12 season was disappointing for his team as they finished in fifth place in the professional league and also ended their run in semi-final of Federation Cup. However, in the following season, in 2012–13, he achieved a rare feat in Bangladeshi football, as his team won the domestic treble. During their treble win, Russel came up on top against rivals Sheikh Jamal Dhanmondi Club in all three occasions.

"I want to dedicate this title to my critics who never considered me as a coach."

— Maruful Haque following his domestic treble triumph.

On 22 October 2012, Sheikh Russel won the first tournament of the 2012–13 season, the Federation Cup, defeating Sheikh Jamal DC 2–1. In the Independence Cup final held on 2 April 2013, Maruf's team defeated Sheikh Jamal DC 3–2. The team confirmed their domestic treble and Premier League triumph simultaneously, on 1 May 2013, when they defeated eventual runners-up, Shiekh Jamal DC 2–1.

=== Sheikh Jamal DC ===
On 4 August 2014, Maruf was handed a one-year suspension by the Bangladesh Football Federation for criticizing the Professional Football League Committee (PFLC) and accusing the committee of favouring the big clubs while scheduling the fixtures of the top flight. He was also fined Tk 30,000 for his comments. His suspension was lifted on 25 December 2014, after he was appointed head coach of Sheikh Jamal Dhanmondi Club.

In December 2014, Maruful who initially joined Sheikh Jamal as a technical director was the head coach. He led them to their third Federation Cup title in 2014–15 season. Before that he also led the club to win an invitational pre-season tournament in Bhutan called Bhutan King's Cup as unbeaten champions. Remaining on the top of the league table after the first leg of the 2014–15 Bangladesh Premier League, unfortunately, the club parted company from his service.

=== Sheikh Russel KC ===
After being sacked by Sheikh Jamal Dhanmondi Club following the first-phase of the 2014–15 Bangladesh Premier League, he was re-appointed by his previous club, Sheikh Russel KC. He guided the team to a runners-up finish in the league.

=== Bangladesh ===
In October 2015, Maruful became the first South Asian to receive a UEFA A license, after completing the final phase of the course from the National Football Centre of England in Burton upon Trent, Staffordshire. This also meant that he was eligible to coach internationally.

On 24 November 2015, Bangladesh Football Federation announced the name of Maruful Haque as the new head coach of Bangladesh national football team. He was appointed till the 2015 SAFF Suzuki Cup. Nonetheless, Bangladesh failed to advance from the group-stages following defeats against Maldives and Afghanistan.

=== Arambagh KS ===
In April 2017, Maruful Haque joins Bangladesh Football League side Arambagh KS. Arambagh played their first game under him in the 2017 Federation Cup against Dhaka Mohammedan where they lost the match by 2–1. During his first season with the club, Maruful was fined by BFF for breaching disciplinary issues as he locked into an altercation with the supporters and found guilty over the issue.

Maruful led the team to their first-ever domestic silverware in the club's history of about 60 years by defeating defending champion Chittagong Abahani in the final of 2017–18 Independence Cup by 2–0. He developed many talented players at this club like Robiul Hasan, Arifur Rahman, etc. Arambagh finished at 5th in 2018-19 BPL, their best result in the league after 2010 & gained 33 points, the highest in their club history.

He departed in 2019 after spending two seasons as the club was amidst casino scandals.

=== Chittagong Abahani ===
In October 2019, Maruful joined Chittagong Abahani as their head coach for the 2019 Sheikh Kamal International Club Cup. He had a very short time for preparation before the tournament. However, he led the team to the final with a newly formed squad where they were defeated by Terengganu FC.

In November 2019, Maruful signed a one-year contract with the port city side for the upcoming season. He became the highest-paid local coach of that season with a record salary of 65 lakh taka. On 15 March 2020, Maruful's Chittagong Abahani came back from three goals down to win 4–3 against defending champions, Bashundhara Kings, in the eventually abandoned 2019–20 Bangladesh Premier League.

=== Bangladesh U23 ===
Following the sacking of Jamie Day, Maruful was named the interim head coach of Bangladesh national u-23 team in late September 2021, one month before the 2022 AFC U-23 Asian Cup qualification. Bangladesh had been drawn with Kuwait, Saudi Arabia and Uzbekistan. Despite insufficient preparation time and superior opponents, Maruful showed high hopes of qualifying in the final round before the tournament. However, the campaign didn't go well for his side as Bangladesh returned home after losing all the three matches without scoring a single goal, including a massive 6–0 defeat against host Uzbekistan.

Maruful's interim duty ended after the AFC U-23 Asian Cup qualification and he returned to coach Chittagong Abahani Limited.

=== Sheikh Jamal DC ===
In August 2022, after seven years awar, Maruful returned to Sheikh Jamal Dhanmondi Club for his second stint. Nonetheless, it was a disappointing return to the club as the Dhanmondi-based club finished fifth in the 2022–23 Bangladesh Premier League, with only five victories from twenty league games.

=== Chittagong Abahani (technical advisor) ===
In August 2023, Maruful obtained his AFC Pro-Diploma. However, he decided to take a break from coaching during the 2023–24 season. On 25 October 2023, he was appointed as the technical advisor of Chittagong Abahani.

=== Bangladesh U20 ===
On 28 August 2024, Maruful guided the Bangladesh U20 team to the 2024 SAFF U-20 Championship title.

== Honours ==
=== Head coach ===
Mohammedan SC

- Bangladesh Football League runner up: 2008–09, 2009–2010
- Bangladesh Federation Cup: 2008, 2009
- Bangladesh Super Cup: 2009

Muktijoddha Sangsad KC

- Bangladesh Football League runner up: 2010–11

Sheikh Russel KC

- Bangladesh Football League: 2012–13
- Bangladesh Federation Cup: 2012
- Independence Cup: 2012–13
- Bangladesh Super Cup runner up: 2013

Sheikh Jamal Dhanmondi Club

- Bangladesh Football League: 2013–14
- Bangladesh Federation Cup: 2014–15
- King's Cup (Bhutan): 2014

Arambagh KS

- Independence Cup: 2017–18

Bangladesh U-20

- SAFF U-20 Championship: 2024

=== Individual ===
- Best Coach: Protiti Pharma Victory Day Football Tournament 2007 Organized by Mohammedan SC
- Best Coach: Bangladesh Sports Writers Association, Dhaka 2009
- Coach of the Year: Bangladesh Sports Award 2011
- Best Coach: Bangladesh Sports Writers Association, Dhaka 2013

== Managerial statistics ==
As of 29 November 2024

Team	From	To	P	W	D	L	GS	GA	%W
Mohammedan SC	May 2008	May 2010	61	48	11	2	150	33	78.69
Muktijoddha Sangsad KC	August 2010	14 July 2011	33	22	7	4	80	23	66.67
Sheikh Russel KC	September 2011	15 April 2014	73	45	12	16	130	61	61.64
Sheikh Jamal DC	14 June 2014	27 May 2015	30	23	4	3	81	31	76.67
Sheikh Russel KC	3 June 2015	26 August 2016	28	12	5	11	46	40	42.86
Bangladesh	24 November 2015	18 January 2016	6	3	1	2	9	9	50.00
Arambagh KS	8 April 2017	2 August 2019	59	22	11	26	82	83	37.29
Chittagong Abahani	October 2019	28 August 2022	70	33	15	22	115	100	47.14
Bangladesh U23 (interim)	25 September 2021	2 November 2021	3	0	0	3	0	10	0.00
Sheikh Jamal DC	25 October 2022	1 August 2023	28	7	11	10	39	46	25.00
Bangladesh U20	1 August 2024	1 October 2024	8	3	2	3	13	15	37.50
Dhaka Abahani	17 September 2024	Present	0	0	0	0	0	0	—

P – Total of played matches W – Won matches D – Drawn matches L – Lost matches GS – Goal scored GA – Goals against
%W – Percentage of matches won
