= Rakib Hossain =

Bangladeshi footballer

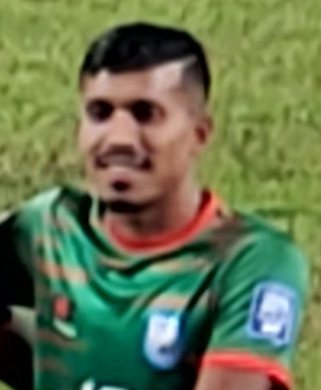
- Rakib with Bangladesh in 2023

Personal information
- Full name: Mohammed Rakib Hossain
- Date of birth: 18 November 1998 (age 27)
- Place of birth: Barisal, Bangladesh
- Height: 1.73 m (5 ft 8 in)
- Position: Right winger

Team information
- Current team: Bashundhara Kings
- Number: 7

Senior career*
Years	Team	Apps	(Gls)
2015–2016	Araf		
2016	Bangladesh Police		(0)
2017–2018	Victoria		(1)
2019–2021	Chittagong Abahani	27	(8)
2021–2022	Dhaka Abahani	18	(3)
2022–	Bashundhara Kings	74	(30)

International career^{‡}
2019	Bangladesh U23	4	(0)
2020–	Bangladesh	55	(7)
Medal record
Representing Bangladesh
South Asian Games
Bronze medal – third place	2019
- * Club domestic league appearances and goals as of 24 October 2026 ‡ National team caps and goals as of 11 November 2026

Mohammed Rakib Hossain (Bengali: মোহাম্মদ রাকিব হোসেন, Bengali pronunciation: [moɦamːɔd rakib ɦosen]; born 18 November 1998) is a Bangladeshi professional footballer who plays for Bangladesh Premier League club, Bashundhara Kings, and the Bangladesh national team. As a versatile player, Rakib can play in a multitude of roles but mostly plays as a right-winger.

== Club career ==
=== Chittagong Abahani ===
He scored a goal against Sheikh Russel KC in the 2020 Federation Cup quarter-final, on 1 January 2021, helping Chittagong Abahani reach the semi-finals of the tournament.

=== Dhaka Abahani ===
On 20 October 2021, Rakib joined Dhanmondi giants Abahani Limited Dhaka.

=== Bashundhara Kings ===
Hossain joined Bashundhara Kings from Abahani Limited Dhaka ahead of the 2022–23 season. He made an immediate impact at his new club, scoring four goals in six matches during the 2022 Independence Cup, for which he was named Player of the Tournament.

In December 2023, Hossain scored the equalising goal in the final of the Independence Cup against Mohammedan Sporting Club, converting a counter-attacking opportunity in the 52nd minute after Bashundhara Kings had conceded the opening goal. Kings subsequently won the match 2–1, and Hossain was named Player of the Tournament for the second time in the competition.

During the 2023–24 Bangladesh Premier League, Hossain scored 10 goals and provided two assists in 18 appearances, helping Bashundhara Kings secure their fifth consecutive league title. In November 2024, he was named the league's best player for the season.

== International career ==
Rakib made his senior debut against Sri Lanka during a 2020 Bangabandhu Cup match on 19 January 2020. He was credited with an assist on Mohammad Ibrahim's goal in the 83rd minute.

During the 2021 SAFF Championship game against Nepal, Rakib's back pass to Anisur Rahman Zico lead to confusion in the Bangladesh defense, and after a late challenge by Zico on Nepali striker Anjan Bista he was sent off. Eventually, 10-men Bangladesh ended up drawing the game 1–1, and thus were reach unable to tournament final.

On 22 September 2022, Rakib scored his first senior international goal for Bangladesh in 1–0 win over Cambodia.

== Personal life ==
His younger brother, Asadul Islam Sakib, is also a professional footballer.

== Career statistics ==
=== International ===
As of 11 November 2026.

Bangladesh
Year	Apps	Goals
2020	3	0
2021	13	0
2022	8	1
2023	11	3
2024	7	0
2025	8	2
2026	5	1
Total	55	7

Scores and results list Bangladesh's goal tally first.

List of international goals scored by Rakib Hossain
No.	Date	Venue	Opponent	Score	Result	Competition	Ref.
1.	22 September 2022	Morodok Techo National Stadium, Phnom Penh, Cambodia	Cambodia	1–0	1–0	Friendly	
2.	25 June 2023	Sree Kanteerava Stadium, Bangalore, India	Maldives	1–1	3–1	2023 SAFF Championship	
3.	28 June 2023	Sree Kanteerava Stadium, Bangalore, India	Bhutan	3–1	3–1	2023 SAFF Championship	
4.	17 October 2023	Bashundhara Kings Arena, Dhaka, Bangladesh	Maldives	1–0	2–1	2026 FIFA World Cup qualification	
5.	10 June 2025	National Stadium, Dhaka, Bangladesh	Singapore	1–2	1–2	2027 AFC Asian Cup qualification	
6.	14 October 2025	Kai Tak Sports Park, Kowloon, Hong Kong	Hong Kong	1–1	1–1	2027 AFC Asian Cup qualification	
7.	11 November 2026	National Stadium, Dhaka, Bangladesh	Sri Lanka	4–0	4–0	2026 SAFF Championship	

== Honours ==
Abahani Limited Dhaka

- Federation Cup: 2021–22
- Independence Cup: 2021–22

Bashundhara Kings

- Bangladesh Premier League: 2022–23, 2023–24
- Independence Cup: 2022–23, 2023–24
- Federation Cup third place: 2022–23

Bangladesh U23

- South Asian Games bronze medal: 2019
