= Chittagong Abahani Limited =

Association football club in Bangladesh

- Full name: Chittagong Abahani Limited
- Nicknames: The Blue Pirates (Bengali: ব্লু পাইরেটস)
- Short name: CAL
- Founded: 10 October 1980; 46 years ago
- Ground: M. A. Aziz Stadium
- Capacity: 30,000
- Head coach: Rakib Uddin
- League: Senior Division Football League
- 2025–26: Bangladesh Championship League, 10th of 10 (relegated)
Home colours	Away colours

Departments of Chittagong Abahani
Football (Men's)	Football (Reserves & Youth)	Cricket (Men's)

Chittagong Abahani Limited (Bengali: চট্টগ্রাম আবাহনী লিমিটেড), also spelled as Chattogram Abahani or Chittagong Abahoni, is a sports club based in Chittagong, Bangladesh. A wing of Abahani Limited was established at Chittagong in 1980, known as Chittagong Abahani. It is one of the most successful football clubs in the country. It currently competes in the Bangladesh Championship League (BCL), the second tier of Bangladeshi football.

The team was relegated from the BPL in the 2010–11 season. It regained promotion to the BPL by becoming champion of the 2013 Bangladesh Championship League. The club host Sheikh Kamal International Club Cup, a bi-annual tournament in memory of their founder, Sheikh Kamal. They won the inaugural edition of the tournament in 2015. The club won their first major domestic trophy in 2016 by winning the 2016 Independence Cup under the guidance of Slovak coach Jozef Pavlik. Chittagong Abahani had a fierce rivalry with Chittagong Mohammedan earlier in Chittagong Premier League and later in Bangladesh Premier League.

== History ==
=== 1980–2000: Beginning ===
In the late 1970s, Didarul Alam Chowdhury was inspired by the Dhaka-based club Abahani Limited Dhaka. He is a football organizer from Chittagong. Didarul wanted to establish a wing of Abahani in Chittagong for the betterment of Sports in Chittagong. He convened a meeting with other local organizers on 10 October 1980. With the meeting, Chittagong Abahani officially started its journey.

Iqbal Khan, popular footballer of Chittagong and father of national cricketers Tamim Iqbal & Nafees Iqbal, played a vital role in Chittagong Abahani's inception. He also played for Chittagong Abahani. Chittagong Abahani won their first-ever Chittagong League title under his captaincy.

=== 2000–2014: Journey at top level ===
Chittagong Abahani qualified for the 2000-01 National Football League after being crowned the 1999 Chittagong League title. The team finished 3rd in the inaugural season under coach Abu Yusuf. In 2001-02 National Football League, Ctg Abahani finished in the Super Four once again. Chittagong Abahani also became runners-up twice in the Chittagong League during 2000s.

In 2007, Bangladesh Football Federation started B. League (now Bangladesh Premier League), country's first professional football league. Chittagong Abahani was one of the founding teams of the league. After struggling in the first three seasons, Ctg Abahani relegated to Bangladesh Championship League in 2010–11 season.

The port city outfit finished at the bottom in their first BCL season. However, there was no relegation system for second tier in that time which saved the team from demotion. The Blue Pirates made a strong comeback in next season becoming Champion of 2013-14 BCL & came back to top tier. Chittagong Abahani finished at 9th in 2014-15 BPL, their returning season to top tier.

=== 2015–present: Beginning of the revolutionary era ===
In November 2014, Tarafder Ruhul Amin of Saif Powertec Limited became chairman of Chittagong Abahani Directorial Board. Saif Powertec Limited becomes new sponsor of Chittagong Abahani.

In 2015, Chittagong Abahani organised inaugural edition of Sheikh Kamal International Club Cup at M. A. Aziz Stadium, Chittagong before the 2015-16 domestic season. It was the first international club tournament at Chittagong since 1982. Chittagong Abahani won the tournament beating Kolkata giant East Bengal in final. The huge attendance of the final broke all the recent records. The port city outfit gave their arrival message as a rising giant with this tournament.

In May 2016, Chittagong Abahani won 2016 Independence Cup under their first ever foreign coach Jozef Pavlik. It was the first domestic major trophy of the club history. Chittagong Abahani finished at 2nd in 2016 BPL, their best result ever. They signed Bangladesh national team Captain Mamunul Islam, Bhutan international Chencho Gyeltshen, former Haiti international Fabrice Noel & Leonel Saint Preux for this season.

Chittagong Abahani also become runners-up of 2017 Independence Cup, 2017 Federation Cup & finished 3rd in 2017-18 BPL. However, the Blue Pirates performed down in 2018–19 season as they knocked out from both tournaments in quarterfinal & obtained 8th position in the league.

== Current squad ==
As of 26 March 2024

Note: Flags indicate national team as defined under FIFA eligibility rules; some limited exceptions apply. Players may hold more than one non-FIFA nationality.

No.	Pos.	Nation	Player
1	GK	BAN	Ashraful Islam Rana
2	DF	BAN	Raihan Hasan
3	DF	BAN	Rashedul Alam Moni
4	DF	BAN	Yeasin Khan (Captain)
5	DF	BAN	Nasiruddin Chowdhury (vice-captain)
6	MF	BAN	Imran Hassan Remon
7	MF	BAN	Kawsar Ali Rabbi
8	MF	BAN	Hemonta Vinsent Biswas
9	FW	BAN	Mannaf Rabby
11	FW	BAN	Jamir Uddin
12	DF	BAN	Sajon Miah
13	MF	BAN	Amiruzzaman Saymon
14	MF	BAN	Sabbir Hossain
15	DF	BAN	Amit Hasan
16	MF	BAN	Sohel Rana
17	MF	BAN	Faysal Ahmed
18	MF	BAN	Ranju Sikder
19	FW	NGR	Ojukwu David Ifegwu (vice-captain)

No.	Pos.	Nation	Player
20	FW	BAN	Jahedul Alam
21	MF	BAN	Sohanur Rahman Sohan
22	GK	BAN	Showkat Hossen Hasan
24	DF	BAN	Riaj Uddin Sagor
25	FW	UZB	Khudoyorkhon Sagdullaev
27	MF	BAN	Shakil Ali
28	DF	BAN	Rifat Hasan Sarthok
29	MF	BAN	Asadul Islam Sakib
30	GK	BAN	Monirul Islam Tuhin
31	DF	BAN	Zahid Hasan
32	FW	NGR	Paul Komolafe
34	MF	NGR	Wasiu Semiu
35	GK	BAN	Nasrul Islam Hero
37	FW	BAN	Iftasam Rahman Jidan
40	GK	BAN	Ariful Islam
44	DF	BAN	Rostam Islam Dukhu Mia
66	MF	BAN	Md Al Imran
99	FW	BAN	Emtiyaz Raihan

== Personnel ==
=== Current technical staff ===
As of 5 April 2024

Position	Name
Head coach	(Bangladesh) Md. Tajuddin Taju
Assistant Coach	(Bangladesh) Arafat Ali Rony
Goalkeeping Coach	(Bangladesh) Md. Shahabuddin
Physiotherapist	(Bangladesh) Fuad Hasan Hawlader
Interpreter	(Bangladesh) Md. Poniruzzaman Ponir
Team Manager	(Bangladesh) Arman Aziz
Technical Director	(Bangladesh) Maruful Haque

== Management ==
=== Board of directors ===
As of January 2023.

Position	Name
President	(Bangladesh) M. Abdul Latif
Vice-president	(Bangladesh) Tarafder MD Ruhul Amin
General Secretary	(Bangladesh) Shamsul Haque Chowdhury
Director	(Bangladesh) Mahbubul Alam
Secretary (Football Committee)	(Bangladesh) Shakil Mahmud Chowdhury

== Team records ==
=== Head coach record ===
As of 4 May 2026

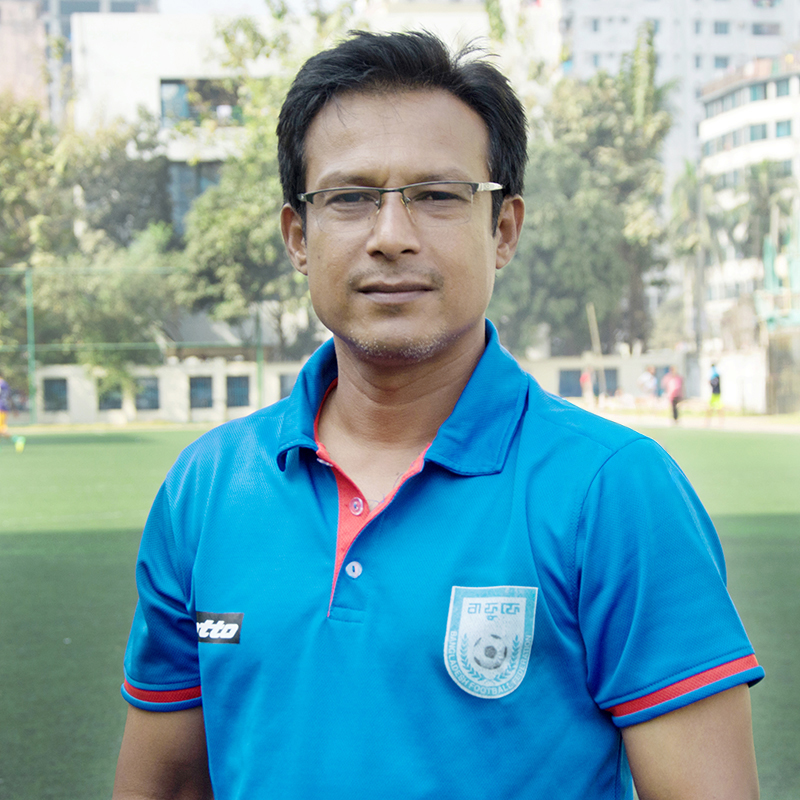
Zulfiker Mahmud Mintu was assistant coach & head coach of the club for more than 3 years.

Head Coach	Nat.	From	To	P	W	D	L	GS	GA	%W
Asaduzzaman Jhontu	(Bangladesh)	2015	n/a	0	0	0	0	0	0	—
Shafiqul Islam Manik	(Bangladesh)	10 August 2015	21 September 2016	5	4	0	1	12	6	80.00
Jozef Pavlík	(Bangladesh)	30 March 2016	21 September 2016	16	8	5	3	26	17	50.00
Zulfiker Mahmud Mintu (interim)	(Bangladesh)	21 September 2016	31 December 2016	15	11	2	2	23	8	73.33
Saiful Bari Titu	(Bangladesh)	9 January 2017	4 January 2018	29	18	6	5	40	23	62.07
Zulfiker Mahmud Mintu	(Bangladesh)	4 January 2018	3 August 2019	38	10	14	14	38	41	26.32
Maruful Haque	(Bangladesh)	October 2019	28 August 2022	70	33	15	22	115	100	47.14
Saiful Bari Titu	(Bangladesh)	9 November 2022	12 February 2023	15	3	5	7	14	23	20.00
Mahabubul Haque Juwel	(Bangladesh)	12 February 2023	25 March 2024	28	7	11	10	35	43	25.00
Md Tajuddin Taju	(Bangladesh)	25 March 2024	30 June 2025	22	2	0	20	52	57	9.09
Rakib Uddin	(Bangladesh)	1 October 2025	Present	18	2	2	14	10	37	11.11

P – Total of played matches W – Won matches D – Drawn matches L – Lost matches GS – Goal scored GA – Goals against
%W – Percentage of matches won

=== Top scorers by season ===
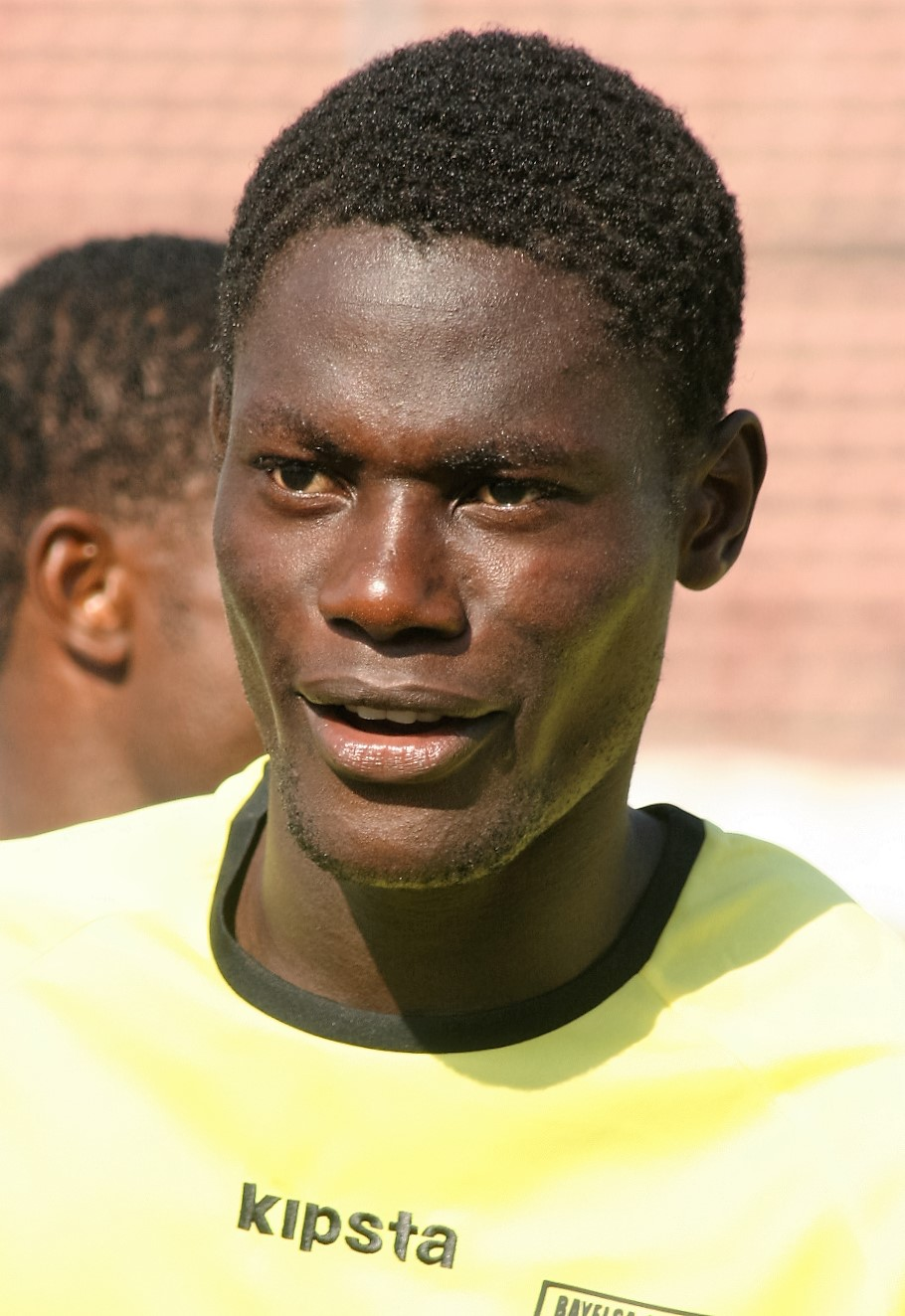
Peter Ebimobowei is the only player in the club's history to score 20 or more Premier League goals in a single season

Season	Player	Total Goals	BPL	Federation Cup	Independence Cup
2017-18	(Bangladesh) Tawhidul Alam Sabuz	10	8	0	2
2018–19	(The Gambia) Momodou Bah	11	6	2	3
2019-20	(Brazil) Nixon Guylherme	5	4	1	Not held
2020-21	(Brazil) Nixon Guylherme	13	12	1	Not held
2021-22	(Nigeria) Peter Ebimobowei	22	20	1	1
2022–23	(Nigeria) Ojukwu David Ifegwu	13	10	1	2

=== All-time top scorers ===
The table is a record of goals scored since 2017–18 season and accurate as of the end of the 2022–23 season. Goals scored in major competitions (Premier League, Federation Cup & Independence Cup) are counted in the list below.

Ranking	Name	Years	Goals
1	(Nigeria) Peter Ebimobowei	2021–22	22
2	(Brazil) Nixon Guylherme	2019–21	18
3	(Nigeria) Ojukwu David Ifegwu	2022–23	13
4	(Nigeria) Matthew Chinedu	2019–21	12
5	(The Gambia) Momodou Bah	2018-19	11
6	(Bangladesh) Tawhidul Alam Sabuj	2017-18	10
7	(Bangladesh) Rakib Hossain	2019–21	9
8	(Ivory Coast) Kpehi Didier Brossou	2019–21	8
9	(Bangladesh) Shakhawat Rony	2017–18, 2019–22	7
10	(Nigeria) Nduka Alison	2017-18	6

Source: Soccerway

=== All-time top scorers in Premier League ===
The table is a record of goals scored since 2017–18 season and accurate as of the end of the 2022–23 season.

Ranking	Name	Years	Goals
1	(Nigeria) Peter Ebimobowei	2022	20
2	(Brazil) Nixon Guylherme	2020–21	16
3	(Nigeria) Matthew Chinedu	2020–21	11
4	(Nigeria) Ojukwu David Ifegwu	2022–23	10
5	(Bangladesh) Tawhidul Alam Sabuj	2017-18	8
6	(Bangladesh) Rakib Hossain	2020–21	7
6	(Ivory Coast) Didier Brossou	2020–21	7
8	(The Gambia) Momodou Bah	2018-19	6
9	(Bangladesh) Shakhawat Rony	2017–18, 2020–22	5
9	(Bangladesh) Ekbal Hossain	2022–23	5
9	(Afghanistan) Omid Popalzay	2022	5

Source: Soccerway

=== Most appearances in Premier League ===
The table is a record of appearances made since 2017–18 season and accurate as of the end of the 2022–23 season.

Ranking	Name	Years	App.
1	(Bangladesh) Monir Alam	2018-22	74
2	(Bangladesh) Koushik Barua	2017–22	68
3	(Bangladesh) Monaem Khan Raju	2018–21	45
4	(Nigeria) Mufta Lawal	2017-19	39
5	(Uzbekistan) Shukurali Pulatov	2020, 2021, 2022–23	38
5	(Bangladesh) Shakhawat Rony	2017–18, 2020–22	34
6	(Bangladesh) Shawkat Russel	2020–22	33
7	(Nigeria) Matthew Chinedu	2019-21	30
8	(Brazil) Nixon Guylherme	2019-21	29
8	(Bangladesh) Mannaf Rabby	2017-18, 2019–21	29
8	(Bangladesh) Arafat Hossen	2020–23	29

Source: Soccerway

== Recent seasons ==
Season	League	Level	Position	Movements
1998–99	Chittagong League	Regional Top Tier	1st	qualified for 2000 NFL
2000–01	NFL	1st Tier	3rd of 8	
2001–02	NFL	1st Tier	Super Four (3rd of 48)	
2003–04	Chittagong League	Regional Top Tier	2nd of 10	
2005–06	Chittagong League	Regional Top Tier	2nd	
2007–08	BPL	1st Tier	10th of 11	
2008–09	BPL	1st Tier	8th of 11	
2009–10	BPL	1st Tier	11th of 13	
2010–11	BPL	1st Tier	12th of 12	Relegated
2011–12	BCL	2nd Tier	7th of 7	
2012–13	BCL	2nd Tier	1st of 8	Promoted
2013–14	BPL	1st Tier	8th of 10	
2014–15	BPL	1st Tier	9th of 11	
2015–16	BPL	1st Tier	2nd of 12	
2017–18	BPL	1st Tier	3rd of 12	
2018–19	BPL	1st Tier	8th of 13	
2019–20	BPL	1st Tier	2nd of 13 (league abandoned)	
2020–21	BPL	1st Tier	5th of 13	
2021-22	BPL	1st Tier	7th of 12	
2022–23	BPL	1st Tier	8th of 11	
2023–24	BPL	1st Tier	7th of 10	
2024–25	BPL	1st Tier	10th of 10	Relegated
2025–26	BCL	2nd Tier	10th of 10	Relegated

Source: RSSF

== Stadium ==
The M. A. Aziz Stadium is the primary home venue of Chittagong Abahani. However, the club also plays their home matches at Bir Sreshtho Flight Lieutenant Matiur Rahman Stadium of Munshiganj. The club also used Bangabandhu National Stadium and Shaheed Dhirendranath Datta Stadium as home venues in some seasons.

== Kit manufacturers and shirt sponsors ==
Period	Kit manufacturer	Shirt sponsor
2015–2017	N/A	Saif Powertec Limited
2018–2019	N/A	Saif Power Battery
2019–2020	Noor Enterprise	Saif Power Battery
2020–2024	Noor Enterprise	Ignite Battery
2024–2025	Designex	Not yet confirmed

== Honours ==
Type	Competitions	Titles	Seasons
Domestic	Bangladesh Premier League	0	Runners-up: 2016
Domestic	Bangladesh Championship League	1	2013
Domestic	Chittagong Premier League	4	1984, 1994, 1996, 1998–99
Domestic	Independence Cup	1	2016
Domestic	Federation Cup	0	Runners-up: 2017
Continental Cup	Sheikh Kamal International Club Cup	1	2015

== Notable overseas players ==
- Players listed below have had senior international cap(s) for their respective countries before, while and/or after playing at Chittagong Abahani. The years indicate the time they played for the club.

Asia

- (Afghanistan) Omid Popalzay (2021–2022)
- (Bhutan) Chencho Gyeltshen (2016–2017)
- (Kyrgyzstan) Daniel Tagoe (2018–2019)
- (Nepal) Santosh Sahukhala (2007–2010)
- (Nepal) Lok Bandhu Gurung (2008–2013)
- (Nepal) Kiran Chemjong (2008–2010)

Africa

- (South Africa) William Twala (2021–2022)
- (Nigeria) Abu Azeez (Note: Abu Azeez represents Nigeria national beach soccer team in FIFA Beach Soccer World Cup and other international beach soccer competitions.) (2023)

North America

- (Haiti) Leonel Saint-Preux (2016–2018)
- (Haiti) Walson Augustin (2017)
- (Haiti) Fabrice Noël (2016)
