= Independence Cup (Bangladesh) =

Annual association football club tournament

- Organiser(s): BFF
- Founded: 1972; 54 years ago
- Region: Bangladesh
- Teams: 12 from (1972–2018); 13 in 2018; 15 in 2021; 16 from 2022
- Related competitions: Bangladesh FL
- Current champions: Bashundhara Kings (3rd title)
- Most championships: Mohammedan SC Bashundhara Kings (3 titles each)
- Broadcaster: T Sports

Independence Cup is a men's association football competition in Bangladesh. The competition started in 1972 and is run by the Bangladesh Football Federation, which is responsible for all types of competitive matches in the country. The tournament is open to Premier League clubs and other registered teams. It can be considered the successor to the Independence Day Football Tournament from the East Pakistan era.

== Results ==
| Edition | Year | Champion | Runners-up | Score |
|---|---|---|---|---|
| 1st | 1972 | Mohammedan SC | East End Club | 3–1 |
| 2nd | 1975 | BIDC | Police AC | 1–0 |
| 3rd | 1990 | Dhaka Abahani | Mohammedan SC | 2–1 |
| 4th | 1991 | Mohammedan SC | Dhaka Abahani | 1 (4)–1 (2) |
| 5th | 2005 | Muktijoddha Sangsad | Brothers Union | 2–0 |
Professional league era
| 6th | 2011 | Farashganj SC | Sheikh Russel | 1 (5)–1 (4) |
| 7th | 2013 | Sheikh Russel | Sheikh Jamal DC | 3–2 |
| 8th | 2014 | Mohammedan SC | Feni Soccer Club | 0 (5)–0 (4) |
| 9th | 2016 | Chittagong Abahani | Dhaka Abahani | 2–0 |
| 10th | 2017–18 | Arambagh KS | Chittagong Abahani | 2–0 |
| 11th | 2018 | Bashundhara Kings | Sheikh Russel | 2–1 |
| 12th | 2021 | Dhaka Abahani | Bashundhara Kings | 3–0 |
| 13th | 2022 | Bashundhara Kings | Sheikh Russel KC | 2 (4)–2 (2) |
| 14th | 2023 | Bashundhara Kings | Mohammedan SC | 2–1 |

== Statistics ==
=== Top goalscorers by season ===
As of 18 December 2023

| Years | Player(s) | Club | Goals |
|---|---|---|---|
| 2011 | (South Sudan) James Moga | Muktijoddha Sangsad | |
| 2014 | (Bangladesh) Jahid Hasan Ameli (Haiti) Sony Norde (Nigeria) Sunday Chizoba | Mohammedan SC; Sheikh Jamal DC; Muktijoddha Sangsad | |
| 2016 | (Nigeria) Sunday Chizoba | Dhaka Abahani | 6 |
| 2017–18 | (Bangladesh) Mohammad Jewel | Arambagh KS | 3 |
| 2018 | (Cameroon) Paul Emile Biyaga | Arambagh KS | 4 |
| 2021 | (Brazil) Dorielton | Dhaka Abahani | 4 |
| 2022 | (Brazil) Dorielton | Bashundhara Kings | 9 |
| 2023 | (Brazil) Jonathan Fernandes (Brazil) Dorielton (Brazil) Higor Leite | Bashundhara Kings; Bashundhara Kings; Sheikh Jamal DC | 3 |

== Sponsors ==
| Seasons | Sponsor |
|---|---|
| 2016 | KFC |
| 2017–18, 2018 | Walton Group |
| 2021–22 | Reviera |
| 2022 | Bashundhara Group |

== See also ==
- Independence Day Football Tournament
- Federation Cup
- Bangladesh Super Cup
- Bangladesh Challenge Cup
- Bangladesh Football League
