= 2020–21 Mohammedan SC (Dhaka) season =

Mohammedan SC
2020–21 season
- President: Golam Md Alamgir
- Head coach: Sean Brendan Lane
- Stadium: Shaheed Dhirendranath Stadium, Comilla
- Bangladesh Premier League: 6 of 13
- Federation Cup: Quarter-final
- Top goalscorer: League: 10 goals Souleymane Diabate; All: 11 goals Souleymane Diabate
- Biggest win: Dhaka Mohammedan 4–1 Uttar Baridhara SC (17 July 2021)
- Biggest defeat: Dhaka Mohammedan 1–4 Bashundhara Kings (1 February 2021)
- All statistics correct as of 27 August 2021.

The 2020–21 season Mohammedan SC's is 13th consecutive and 85th overall seasons in top-flight football since professional competition formed on 2007 in Bangladesh. The season covering a period from 24 December 2020 to August 2021.

== Current squad ==
Dhaka Mohammedan squad for 2020–21 season.

As of 15 December 2020

Note: Flags indicate national team as defined under FIFA eligibility rules; some limited exceptions apply. Players may hold more than one non-FIFA nationality.

No.	Pos.	Nation	Player
1	GK	BAN	Ahsan Habib Bipu
2	DF	BAN	Masud Rana Mredha
3	DF	BAN	Kamrul Islam
4	DF	BFA	Mounzir Coulidiati
5	DF	BAN	Mohamed Atikuzzaman
6	MF	BAN	Anik Hossain
7	MF	BAN	Habibur Rahman Sohag
8	MF	BAN	Shamol Bepari
9	FW	BAN	Aminur Rahman Sajib
10	FW	MLI	Souleymane Diabate
11	MF	BAN	Yousuf Sifat
12	MF	BAN	Sahed Hossain
14	DF	BAN	Emon Khan
15	MF	BAN	Sayed Rakib Khan Evan
16	MF	BAN	Sohanur Rahman
17	MF	BAN	Mohammad Mithu

No.	Pos.	Nation	Player
18	FW	BAN	Saief Samsud
19	MF	JPN	Uryu Nagata (Captain)
20	MF	NGR	Mohammed Abiola Nurat
21	MF	BAN	Farhad Mona
22	GK	BAN	Shakib Al Hasan
23	DF	BAN	Sadat Hamid
24	MF	BAN	Ashraful Haque Asif
25	DF	BAN	Sadekujaman Fahim
26	FW	BAN	Jahedul Alam
27	MF	BAN	Imran Hossain Pappu
28	DF	BAN	Rajib Hossain
29	FW	BAN	Amir Hakim Bappy
30	GK	BAN	Mohammad Sujon
33	GK	BAN	Rakib Hossain
37	FW	BAN	Jafar Iqbal

== Competitions ==
=== Overview ===
Competition	First match	Last match	Starting round	Final position	Record							
Competition	First match	Last match	Starting round	Final position	Pld	W	D	L	GF	GA	GD	Win %
BPL	17 January 2020	27 August 2021	Matchday 1	6 of 13	24	12	7	5	36	25	+11	50.00
Federation Cup	24 December 2020	2 January 2020	Group stage	Qaarter-Final	3	1	0	2	6	6	+0	33.33
Independence Cup	July 2021				0	0	0	0	0	0	+0	—
Total					27	13	7	7	42	31	+11	48.15

Last updated: 27 August 2021
Source: Soccerway

=== Federation Cup ===
==== Group D ====
Pos	Team	Pld	W	D	L	GF	GA	GD	Pts	Qualification
1	Dhaka Abahani	2	2	0	0	5	1	+4	6	Quarter Finals
2	Dhaka Mohammedan	2	1	0	1	4	4	0	3	Quarter Finals
3	Muktijoddha Sangsad KC	2	0	0	2	2	6	−4	0	

Source: Soccerway

24 December 2020 Group Stage	Dhaka Abahani	3-0	Dhaka Mohammedan	Bangabandhu National Stadium, Dhaka
19:15 BST	Masih 41'; Jewel 45', 53'	Report		Referee: Mizanur Rahman (Bangladesh)

27 December 2020 Group Stage	Dhaka Mohammedan	4–1	Muktijoddha Sangsad KC	Bangabandhu National Stadium, Dhaka
17:45 BST	Shohag 42'; Atiquzzaman 75'; Nurat 80', 83'	Report	Kholdarov 68'	Referee: Jashim Akter (Bangladesh)

==== Knockout phage ====
2 January 2021 Quarter-final	Saif Sporting Club	2–2 (a.e.t.) (7–6 p)	Dhaka Mohammedan	Dhaka
16:00 BST	Ariwachukwu 7'; Ikechukwu 13'	Report	Atiquzzaman 1'; Diabate 44'	Stadium: Bangabandhu National Stadium; Referee: S.M. Jashim Akter (Bangladesh)
	Penalties
	Ikechukwu (penalty scored); Shahed (penalty scored); Okoli (penalty scored); Yeasin (penalty missed); Ariwachukwu (penalty scored); Rahim (penalty scored); Rahmat (penalty scored); Sirozhiddin (penalty scored)		(penalty scored) Diabate; (penalty missed) Sajib; (penalty scored) Nagata; (penalty scored) Shohag; (penalty scored) Mithu; (penalty scored) Coulidiati; (penalty scored) Bappy; (penalty missed) Atiquzzaman

=== Premier League ===
==== League table ====
Pos	Team	Pld	W	D	L	GF	GA	GD	Pts
4	Saif Sporting Club	24	14	2	8	48	37	+11	44
5	Chittagong Abahani	24	13	5	6	38	28	+10	44
6	Dhaka Mohammedan	24	12	7	5	36	25	+11	43
7	Sheikh Russel KC	24	11	3	10	36	31	+5	36
8	Rahmatganj MFS	24	6	7	11	23	31	−8	25

Source: Soccerway
Rules for classification: 1) Points; 2) Goal difference; 3) Goals scored.

==== Results summary ====
Overall								Home						Away					
Pld	W	D	L	GF	GA	GD	Pts	W	D	L	GF	GA	GD	W	D	L	GF	GA	GD
24	12	7	5	36	25	+11	43	7	1	3	17	9	+8	5	6	2	19	16	+3

Last updated: 27 August 2021.
Source: Soccerway

==== Results by round ====
Round	1	2	3	4	5	6	7	8	9	10	11	12	13	14	15	16	17	18	19	20	21	22	23	24
Ground	A	H	A	H	A	A	H	A	H	A	A	H	A	H	A	A	H	H	A	H	A	A	A	H
Result	W	L	D	D	L	D	W	W	W	D	W	W	L	W	W	D	L	W	D	W	W	D	W	L
Position	1	6	6	7	8	9	6	6	5	5	6	6	6	6	5	4	4	4	5	5	4	5	4	4

Updated to match(es) played on 27 August 2021. Source: Matches
A = Away; H = Home; W = Win; D = Draw; L = Loss; P = Postponed; - = Rest

==== Matches ====
17 January 2021 1	Arambagh KS	0–3	Mohammedan SC	Dhaka
20:00 BST	M.Molla (yellow card) 27'; C.Chizoba; (penalty missed)	Report	Diabate (yellow card) 5'; Diabate 19'; Nagata (yellow card) 23'; Nurat 30'; J.Iqbal (yellow card) 38'; Sajib 46'	Stadium: Bangabandhu National Stadium; Referee: Mohammed Jalal Uddin

21 January 2021 2	Mohammedan SC	1–2	Saif SC	Cumilla
15:00 BST	Nagata 48'	Report	Arifur 44'; Okoli 45+2'	Stadium: Comilla Stadium; Referee: Mizanur Rahman

24 January 2021 3	Sheikh Russel KC	1–1	Mohammedan SC	Dhaka
15:30 BST	Giancarlo 56'	Report	Diabate 45+1' (P)	Stadium: Bangabandhu National Stadium; Referee: B. Barua

28 January 2021 4	Mohammedan SC	2–2	Dhaka Abahani	Comilla
15:00 BST	Souleymane Diabate 17', 66'	Report	Francisco Wagsley 14'; Jewel Rana 43'	Stadium: Comilla Stadium; Referee: Mohammed Jalal Uddin

1 February 2021 5	Bashundhara Kings	4–1	Mohammedan	Comilla
15:00 BST	Becerra 10', 81'(P); Robinho 45+1'; Fernandes 50'	Report	Nurat 22'	Stadium: Comilla Stadium; Referee: Bitu Raz

5 February 2021 6	Uttar Baridhara	1–1	Mohammedan	Tongi
15:00 BST	Kochnev 18' (P)	Report	Souleymane Diabate 45+2' (P)	Stadium: Shahid Ahsan Ullah Master Stadium; Referee: B.Uddin (Bangladesh)

9 February 2021 7	Mohammedan	1–0	Bangladesh Police FC	Comilla
15:00 BST	Uryu Nagata 47'	Report		Stadium: Comilla Stadium; Referee: M. Uddin (Bangladesh)

14 February 2021 8	Brothers Union	1–2	Mohammedan	Dhaka
18:00 BST	Nur Rahman 11'	Report	Bappy 7'; Souleymane Diabate 73'	Stadium: Bangabandhu National Stadium; Referee: A. Rahman (Bangladesh)

17 February 2021 9	Mohammedan	2–0	Rahmatganj MFS	Comilla
15:00 BST	Souleymane Diabate 3'; Bappy 90+5'	Report		Stadium: Comilla Stadium; Referee: M. Uddin (Bangladesh)

26 February 2021 10	Chittagong Abahani	1–1	Mohammedan	Dhaka
18:15 BST	Rakib Hossain 15'	Report	S.R. Khan 54'	Stadium: Bangabandhu National Stadium; Referee: B. Torofdar (Bangladesh)

2 March 2021 11	Mohammedan	2–0	Muktijoddha SKC	Comilla
15:00 BST	Souleymane Diabate 35'; Coulidiati 61'	Report		Stadium: Comilla Stadium; Referee: M. Nahid (Bangladesh)

7 March 2021 12	Sheikh Jamal	2–0	Mohammedan	Dhaka
16:00 BST	Atabek Validjanov 25'; Solomon King Kanform 83'	Report		Stadium: Bangabandhu National Stadium; Referee: C. Nawan

1 May 2021 13	Mohammedan	2–1	Arambagh KS	Dhaka
16:00 BST	Souleymane Diabate 9', 90+3'	Report	Habibur Rahman Sohag 46' (O.G)	Stadium: Bangabandhu National Stadium; Referee: Jasim Akter

5 May 2021 14	Saif SC	2-1	Mohammedan	Dhaka
16:00 BST	Quatohing Yassin 52'; Souleymane Diabate 83'	Report	Maraz Hossain 69'	Stadium: Bangabandhu National Stadium; Referee: Anisur Rahman

8 May 2021 15	Mohammedan	1-0	Sheikh Russel KC	Dhaka
16:00 BST	M.F. Mona (yellow card) 16'; Coulidiati 37'	Report	H.Biswas; (yellow card) 60': A.Bablu (yellow card) 80'; S.G. Newaz (yellow card) 80'	Stadium: Bangabandhu National Stadium; Referee: Mohammed Jalal Uddin

27 June 2021 16	Dhaka Abahani	1–1	Mohammedan	Dhaka
17:00 BST	Belfot 41'		Ouatching 30'; Iqbal (yellow card) 37'	Stadium: Bangabandhu National Stadium; Referee: Mizanur Rahman

30 June 2021 17	Dhaka Mohammedan	0–1	Bashundhara Kings	Dhaka
16:30 BST	Rana (yellow card) 19'; Suzan (red card) 20'; Atikuzzaman (yellow card) 38'; Diabate (yellow card) 52'; Masud Rana (yellow card) 54'	Report	Bishwanath Ghosh (yellow card) 18'; Khan (yellow card) 25' (yellow-red card) 76'; Becerra 90+4'	Stadium: Bangabandhu National Stadium; Referee: Jasim Akter

17 July 2021 18	Dhaka Mohammedan	4–1	Uttar Baridhara SC	Dhaka
16:30 BST	Amir Hakim Bappy 19'; Mohammd Masud Rana Mredha (yellow card) 32'; S. Diabate 36'; Anik Hossain 45+1'; Mohammed Kamrul Islam (yellow card) 67'; Mohammed Ahsan Habib (yellow card) 73'; Yassan Ouatching 81'; Sohanur Rahman (yellow card) 87'	Report	Sumon Reza 24'; Jubayed Hasan Zikon (yellow card) 39'	Stadium: Bangabandhu National Stadium; Referee: Mohmmed Jalaluddin

5 August 2021 19	Bangladesh Police FC	1–1	Dhaka Mohammedan	GM Chowdhury Nayon
16:00 BST	Arifuzzanam Hemel (yellow card) 70': C. Kouakou 86'	Report	J. Iqbal 17'; Sahed Hossan Miah (yellow card) 45'; Amir Hamkim Bappy (yellow card) 48'; Mohamed Atikuzzaman (yellow card) 88'	Stadium: Bangabandhu National Stadium

10 August 2021 20	Dhaka Mohammedan	2–0	Brothers Union	Dhaka
16:00 BST	Shahed Hossain 41'; Anik Hossain (yellow card) 66'; Souleymane Diabate 83'	Report	Mohammad Titumir Chowdhury (yellow card) 52'	Stadium: Bangladesh Army Stadium; Referee: GM Chowdhury Nayon

14 August Augustus 2021 21	Rahmatganj MFS	1–2	Dhaka Mohammedan	Dhaka
16:00 BST	F. Odili 4' (pen.)	Report	Anik Hossain (yellow card) 34'; Kamrul Islam 38'; Mounzir Coulidiati 71'	Stadium: Bangabandhu National Stadium; Referee: Anisur Rahman

20 August 2021 22	Dhaka Mohammedan	2–2	Chittagong Abahani	Dhaka
	Coulidiati (yellow card) 13'; J.Iqbal 22'; Diabate (penalty missed) 34; A.H.Bappy 59'; M.Mredha (yellow card) 63'	Report	Didier 6'; M. Chinedu 24'; Rakib (yellow card) 28'; S. Russell (yellow card) 32'	Stadium: Bangabandhu National Stadium; Referee: Mohammed Jalaluddin

24 August 2021 23	Muktijoddha Sangsad KC	0–2	Dhaka Mohammedan	Dhaka
16:00 BST	M. Royal (yellow card) 6'; I. Dick (penalty missed) 48	Report	Y. Outching 30'; M. Atikuzzaman 33'; M. Mredha (yellow card) 65'; S. Diabate (yellow card) 68'; R. Hossaon (yellow card) 87'	Stadium: Bangladesh Army Stadium; Referee: Mahmud Zamal Farouqee Nahid

27 August 2021 24	Dhaka Mohammedan	0–2	Sheikh Jamal DC	Dhaka
16:15 BST	Rakib (yellow card) 7'; Fahim (yellow card) 87'	Report	Shakil (yellow card) 13'; Validjanov (yellow card) 51' (red card) 90'; Faysal (yellow card) 63'; Monir (yellow card) 86'; Kanform 52', 88'	Stadium: Bangladesh Army Stadium; Referee: Bituraj Barua

== Statistics ==
=== Goalscorers ===
As of match played till 27 August 2021

Rank	Player	Position	Total	BPL	Federation Cup	Independence Cup
1	(Mali) Souleymane Diabate	FW	14	13	1	0
2	(Nigeria) Mohammed Abiola Nurat	MF	4	2	2	0
2	(Cameroon) Yassan Ouatching	FW	4	4	0	0
2	(Bangladesh) Amir Hakim Bappy	FW	4	4	0	0
3	(Bangladesh) Mohamed Atikuzzaman	DF	3	1	2	0
3	(Burkina Faso) Mounzir Coulidiati	DF	3	3	0	0
4	(Japan) Uryu Nagata	MF	2	2	0	0
4	(Bangladesh) Jafar Iqbal	FW	2	2	0	0
5	(Bangladesh) Habibur Rahman Sohag	MF	1	0	1	0
5	(Bangladesh) Aminur Rahman Sajib	FW	1	1	0	0
5	(Bangladesh) Anik Hossain	MF	1	1	0	0
5	(Bangladesh) Sahed Hossain	MF	1	1	0	0
5	(Bangladesh) Kamrul Islam	DF	1	1	0	0
Total			41	35	6	0

Source: Matches
