= 2020–21 in Bangladeshi football =

Bangladeshi football season

Football in Bangladesh
- Season: 2020–21

Men's football
- BPL: Bashundhara Kings
- BCL: Swadhinata KS
- Federation Cup: Bashundhara Kings

The following article presents a summary of the 2020–21 football (soccer) season in Bangladesh, which is the 49th season of competitive football in the country.

== National team ==
=== Bangladesh men's national football team ===
Results and fixtures

13 November 2020 Friendly	Bangladesh	2–0	Nepal	Dhaka, Bangladesh
17:00 UTC+6	Jibon 10'; Sufil 80'	Report		Stadium: Bangabandhu National Stadium; Referee: Bituraj Barua (Bangladesh)

17 November 2020 Friendly	Bangladesh	0–0	Nepal	Dhaka, Bangladesh
17:00 UTC+6		Report		Stadium: Bangabandhu National Stadium; Referee: Mizanur Rahman (Bangladesh)

4 December 2020 2022 World Cup qualification	Qatar	5–0	Bangladesh	Doha, Qatar
19:00 UTC+3	Hatem 9'; Afif 33', 90+2'; Ali 72' (pen.), 78'	Report		Stadium: Jassim Bin Hamad Stadium; Attendance: 1,044; Referee: Mohd Amirul Izwan Yaacob (Malaysia)

23 March 2021 2021 Three Nations Cup	Bangladesh	1–0	Kyrgyzstan U23	Kathmandu, Nepal
16:45 UTC+6	Kumarbay uulu 30' (o.g.)			Stadium: Dasarath Rangasala Stadium

27 March 2021 2021 Three Nations Cup	Nepal	0–0	Bangladesh	Kathmandu, Nepal
18:45 UTC+6		Report		Stadium: Dasarath Rangasala Stadium; Referee: Tejas Nagvenkar (India)

29 March 2021 2021 Three Nations Cup	Nepal	2–1	Bangladesh	Kathmandu, Nepal
18:45 UTC+6	S. Rai 18'; B. Rai 42'	Report	Sufil 83'	Stadium: Dasarath Rangasala Stadium; Referee: Tejas Nagvenkar (India)

== Bangladesh Premier League ==
=== Table ===
Pos	Team	Pld	W	D	L	GF	GA	GD	Pts	Qualification or relegation
1	Bashundhara Kings (C, Q)	24	21	2	1	60	10	+50	65	Qualification for AFC Cup Group stage
2	Sheikh Jamal DC (Note: Sheikh Jamal cannot qualify for Asian Football Confederation competitions as they were not granted an AFC Cup license for 2022.)	24	15	7	2	53	28	+25	52	
3	Dhaka Abahani (Q)	24	13	8	3	65	29	+36	47	Qualification for AFC Cup qualifying play-offs
4	Saif Sporting Club	24	14	2	8	48	37	+11	44	
5	Chittagong Abahani	24	13	5	6	38	28	+10	44	
6	Dhaka Mohammedan	24	12	7	5	36	25	+11	43	
7	Sheikh Russel KC	24	11	3	10	36	31	+5	36	
8	Rahmatganj MFS	24	6	7	11	23	31	−8	25	
9	Bangladesh Police FC	24	6	7	11	26	39	−13	25	
10	Muktijoddha Sangsad KC	24	4	7	13	18	34	−16	19	
11	Uttar Baridhara Club	24	4	7	13	33	63	−30	19	
12	Arambagh KS (R)	24	2	2	20	20	66	−46	8	Demotion to Senior Division League (Note: Arambagh KS demoted to the Senior Division League for two years after their involvement in live betting, spot fixing, match manipulation and online betting in three BPL matches.)
13	Brothers Union (R)	24	1	4	19	16	51	−35	7	Relegation to Bangladesh Championship League

Source: Soccerway
Rules for classification: 1) Points; 2) Goal difference; 3) Goals scored.
(C) Champions; (Q) Qualify for the AFC competition; (R) Relegated

== Federation Cup ==
=== Group A ===
- All matches will be held at Dhaka
- Time listed are UTC+6:00

Key to colour in group tables
Group Winners and Runners-up advance to the Knockout stage

=== Group A ===
Pos	Team	Pld	W	D	L	GF	GA	GD	Pts	Qualification
1	Sheikh Russel KC	2	2	0	0	4	2	+2	6	Advance to Knockout stage
2	Sheikh Jamal Dhanmondi Club	2	0	1	1	4	5	−1	1	Advance to Knockout stage
3	Bangladesh Police FC	2	0	1	1	2	3	−1	1	

Source: Soccerway

=== Group B ===
Pos	Team	Pld	W	D	L	GF	GA	GD	Pts	Qualification
1	Saif Sporting Club	3	3	0	0	10	1	+9	9	Advance to Knockout stage
2	Uttar Baridhara Club	3	2	0	1	6	5	+1	6	Advance to Knockout stage
3	Arambagh KS	3	1	0	2	4	4	0	3	
4	Brothers Union	3	0	0	3	1	11	−10	0	

Source: Soccerway

=== Group C ===
Pos	Team	Pld	W	D	L	GF	GA	GD	Pts	Qualification
1	Bashundhara Kings	2	2	0	0	4	0	+4	6	Advance to Knockout stage
2	Chittagong Abahani	2	1	0	1	1	1	0	3	Advance to Knockout stage
3	Rahmatganj MFS	2	0	0	2	0	4	−4	0	

Source: Soccerway

=== Group D ===
Pos	Team	Pld	W	D	L	GF	GA	GD	Pts	Qualification
1	Dhaka Abahani	2	2	0	0	5	1	+4	6	Advance to Knockout stage
2	Mohammedan SC	2	1	0	1	4	4	0	3	Advance to Knockout stage
3	Muktijoddha Sangsad KC	2	0	0	2	2	6	−4	0	

Source: Soccerway

=== Knockout-stage ===
- All matches will play at Dhaka
- Times listed are UTC+6:00
- In the knockout stage, extra-time and a penalty shoot-out will used to decide the winner if necessary.

=== Bracket ===
Quarter finals
1 January 2021
Sheikh Russel KC	0
Chittagong Abahani (a.e.t.)	2
2 January 2021
Saif Sporting Club (p)	2 (7)
Mohammedan SC	2 (6)
3 January 2021
Bashundhara Kings	2
Sheikh Jamal Dhanmondi Club	0
4 January 2021
Dhaka Abahani	1
Uttar Baridhara Club	0

Semi finals
6 January 2021
Chittagong Abahani	0
Saif Sporting Club	3
7 January 2021
Bashundhara Kings (a.e.t.)	3
Dhaka Abahani	1

Final
10 January 2021
Saif Sporting Club	0
Bashundhara Kings	1

=== Quarter-finals ===
1 January 2021
16:00 BST

Sheikh Russel KC	0–2 (a.e.t.)	Chittagong Abahani
	Report	Rakib 107'; Mannaf 113'

Bangabandhu National Stadium, Dhaka
Referee: Anisur Rahman (Bangladesh)

2 January 2021
16:00 BST

Saif Sporting Club	2–2 (a.e.t.)	Mohammedan SC
Ariwachukwu 7'; Ikechukwu 13'	Report	Atikuzzaman 1'; Diabate 44'
Penalties
Ikechukwu (penalty scored); Shahed (penalty scored); Okoli (penalty scored); Yeasin (penalty missed); Ariwachukwu (penalty scored); Rahim (penalty scored); Rahmat (penalty scored); Sirozhiddin (penalty scored)	7–6	(penalty scored) Diabate; (penalty missed) Sajib; (penalty scored) Nagata; (penalty scored) Sohag; (penalty scored) Mithu; (penalty scored) Coulidiati; (penalty scored) Bappy; (penalty missed) Atikuzzaman

Bangabandhu National Stadium, Dhaka
Referee: S.M. Jashim Akter (Bangladesh)

3 January 2021
16:00 BST

Bashundhara Kings	2–0	Sheikh Jamal Dhanmondi Club
Becerra 10'; Robinho 89'	Report

Bangabandhu National Stadium, Dhaka

4 January 2021
16:00 BST

Dhaka Abahani	1–0	Uttar Baridhara Club
Wagsley 90+5'	Report

Bangabandhu National Stadium, Dhaka
Referee: Alomgir Sarker (Bangladesh)

=== Semi-finals ===
6 January 2021
16:00 BST

Chittagong Abahani	0–3	Saif Sporting Club
	Report	Ariwachukwu 8'; Ikechukwu 71'; Yeasin 90'

Bangabandhu National Stadium, Dhaka
Referee: Jalal Uddin (Bangladesh)

7 January 2021
16:00 BST

Bashundhara Kings	3–1 (a.e.t.)	Dhaka Abahani
Fernandes 51', 120+1'; Becerra 111'	Report	Wagsley 31'

Bangabandhu National Stadium, Dhaka
Referee: Sujit Banarjee (Bangladesh)

=== Final ===
10 January 2021
16:00 BST

Saif Sporting Club	0–1	Bashundhara Kings
	Report	Becerra 52'

Bangabandhu National Stadium, Dhaka
Referee: Jalal Uddin (Bangladesh)

== Championship League ==
=== League table ===
Pos	Team	Pld	W	D	L	GF	GA	GD	Pts	BPL
1	Swadhinata KS (C, P)	22	13	6	3	30	11	+19	45	Qualification to 2021–22 BPL
2	NoFeL Sporting Club	22	13	5	4	34	10	+24	44	
3	Fortis FC	22	12	7	3	40	17	+23	43	
4	Kawran Bazar PS	22	12	5	5	32	17	+15	41	
5	Agrani Bank Ltd. SC	22	6	9	7	18	20	−2	27	
6	Dhaka WC	22	7	6	9	22	28	−6	27	
7	Fakirerpool YMC	22	6	8	8	25	21	+4	26	
8	Farashganj SC	22	5	10	7	25	27	−2	25	
9	Uttara FC	22	6	7	9	20	23	−3	25	
10	Wari Club	22	5	10	7	20	24	−4	25	
11	Dhaka City FC (R)	22	4	9	9	14	25	−11	21	Relegation to 2021–22 First Division Football League
12	Victoria SC (R)	22	0	4	18	8	65	−57	4	Relegation to 2021–22 First Division Football League

Source: Sofascore
(C) Champions; (P) Promoted; (R) Relegated
