= 2020–21 Bashundhara Kings season =

Bashundhara Kings
2020–21 season
- Owner: Bashundhara Group
- President: (Bangladesh) Imrul Hassan
- Head coach: (Spain) Óscar Bruzón
- Stadium: Shaheed Dhirendranath Stadium, Cumilla
- Bangladesh Premier League: 1st of 13
- Federation Cup: Winners
- Independence Cup: TBC
- AFC Cup: Group Stage
- Top goalscorer: League: Robinho (20); All: Robinho (23)
- Biggest win: 6–0 Vs Uttar Baridhara Club (30 April 2021)
- Biggest defeat: 1–2 Vs Chittagong Abahani (18 July 2021)
Home colours	Away colours
- All statistics correct as of 24 August 2021.

The 2020–21 season is Bashundhara Kings's 8th season as a football club since its creation in 2013, and its 3rd consecutive season in the top-flight. In addition to domestic league, Bashundhara participated on this season's edition of Federation Cup and AFC Cup. The season covered the period from December 2020 to September 2021, with the late ending to the season due to the COVID-19 pandemic in Bangladesh.

== Current squad ==
As of 14 May 2021

Note: Flags indicate national team as defined under FIFA eligibility rules; some limited exceptions apply. Players may hold more than one non-FIFA nationality.

No.	Pos.	Nation	Player
1	GK	BAN	Mitul Hasan
2	DF	BAN	Sushanto Tripura
3	DF	BAN	Nurul Naium Faisal
4	DF	BAN	Topu Barman (captain)
6	MF	BAN	Emon Mahmud Babu
7	MF	BAN	Masuk Mia Jony
8	MF	BRA	Fernandes
9	FW	ARG	Raúl Becerra
10	FW	BRA	Robinho (on loan from Fluminense)
11	FW	BAN	Tawhidul Alam Sabuz
12	DF	BAN	Bishwanath Ghosh
13	MF	BAN	Atiqur Rahman Fahad
14	DF	BAN	Yeasin Khan
15	MF	BAN	Biplu Ahmed

No.	Pos.	Nation	Player
17	FW	BAN	Mahbubur Rahman Sufil
18	MF	BAN	Sheikh Alamgir Kabir Rana
19	MF	BAN	Mohammad Ibrahim
20	FW	BAN	Eleta Kingsley
21	FW	BAN	Rasel Ahmed
22	GK	BAN	Anisur Rahman Zico
29	FW	BAN	Motin Mia
32	GK	BAN	Mehedi Hasan
36	GK	BAN	Hamidur Rahman Remon
40	DF	BAN	Tariq Kazi
41	FW	BAN	Obaidur Rahman Nawbab
44	DF	IRI	Khaled Shafiei
49	DF	BAN	Tareq Miah
58	MF	BAN	Mahdi Khan
71	FW	BAN	Rimon Hossain
99	MF	BAN	Fahim Morshed

== Transfers ==
=== Transfers in ===
No.	Pos	Player	Previous club	Fee	Date	Source
8	MF	(Brazil) Jonathan Fernandes	(Brazil) Botafogo	Free	21 August 2020	
44	DF	(Iran) Khaled Shafiei	(Iran) Saipa F.C.	Free	30 October 2020	
9	FW	(Argentina) Raúl Becerra	(Qatar) Umm Salal SC	Free	31 October 2020	
58	MF	(Bangladesh) Mahdi Khan	(England) Sporting Bengal United F.C.	Free	21 December 2020	
20	FW	(Bangladesh) Eleta Kingsley	(Bangladesh) Arambagh KS	Free	1 April 2021	
41	FW	(Bangladesh) Obidur Rahman Nawbab	(Qatar) Al-Duhail SC	Free	8 April 2021	

=== Loans in ===
No.	Pos	Player	Transferred from	Fee	Date	Source
10	FW	(Brazil) Robinho	(Brazil) Fluminense	Free	5 August 2020	

=== Transfers out ===
No.	Pos	Player	Moved to	Fee	Date	Source
91	DF	(Tajikistan) Akhtam Nazarov	(Tajikistan) FC Istiklol	Free	12 June 2020	
35	DF	(Argentina) Nicolás Delmonte	(Spain) Zamora CF	Free	13 June 2020	
26	FW	(Costa Rica) Daniel Colindres	(Costa Rica) Saprissa	Free	11 June 2020	
20	MF	(Kyrgyzstan) Bakhtiyar Duyshobekov	(Kyrgyzstan) FC Abdysh-Ata Kant	Free	12 June 2020	
28	FW	(Argentina) Hernan Barcos	(Italy) A.C.R. Messina	Free	31 October 2020	
27	FW	(Bangladesh) Nihat Jaman Ucchash	(Bangladesh) Arambagh KS	Free	3 November 2020	
88	MF	(Bangladesh) Robiul Hasan	(Bangladesh) Dhaka Mohammedan	৳1500000 ($17700)	17 April 2021	

== Pre-season & friendlies ==
Legend

Win Draw Loss Void or Postponed Fixtures

=== Maldives tour ===
In 2020, Bashundhara Kings were going to play two friendlies against TC Sports Club and Maziya S&RC as a part of pre-season camp in Maldives, but later cancelled.

October 2020	TC Sports Club (Maldives)	Cancelled	Bashundhara Kings (Bangladesh)	Maldives

October 2020	Maziya S&RC (Maldives)	Cancelled	Bashundhara Kings (Bangladesh)	Maldives

=== Friendly ===
1 December 2020	Bashundhara Kings	2–0	Muktijoddha Sangsad KC	Bangladesh
				Stadium: Bashundhara Sports Complex Ground

6 June 2021	Bashundhara Kings	4–1	Uttar Baridhara Club	Bangladesh
	Nawab Becerra	Report	Sujon Biswas	Stadium: Bashundhara Sports Complex Ground

15 June 2021	Bashundhara Kings	2–0	Muktijoddha Sangsad KC	Dhaka
	Kingsley; Becerra	Report		Stadium: Bashundhara Sports Complex Ground

19 June 2021	Bashundhara Kings	1–0	Sheikh Russel KC	Dhaka
	Fernandes	Report		Stadium: Bashundhara Sports Complex Ground

== Competitions ==
=== Overview ===
Competition	First match	Last match	Starting round	Final position	Record							
Competition	First match	Last match	Starting round	Final position	Pld	W	D	L	GF	GA	GD	Win %
BPL	13 January 2021	20 September 2021	Matchday 1	Winner	23	20	2	1	57	10	+47	86.96
Federation Cup	22 December 2020	10 January 2021	Group stage	Winner	5	5	0	0	10	1	+9	100.00
Independence Cup	September 2021	October 2021	Group stage	Did not held	0	0	0	0	0	0	+0	—
AFC Cup	18 August 2021	24 August 2021	Group stage	Group					—			
Total					28	25	2	1	67	11	+56	89.29

Last updated: 20 September 2021
Source: Competitions

=== Federation Cup ===
==== Group C ====
Pos	Team	Pld	W	D	L	GF	GA	GD	Pts	Qualification
1	Bashundhara Kings	2	2	0	0	4	0	+4	6	Knockout-stage
2	Chittagong Abahani	2	1	0	1	1	1	0	3	Knockout-stage
3	Rahmatganj MFS	2	0	0	2	0	4	−4	0	

Source: Soccerway

22 December 2020 Group Stage	Bashundhara Kings	3-0	Rahmatganj MFS	Bangabandhu National Stadium, Dhaka
17:30 BST	Becerra 43'; Robinho 53'; Nasr 65' (o.g.)	Report		Referee: Sujit Banarjee (Bangladesh)

28 December 2020 Group Stage	Chittagong Abahani	0–1	Bashundhara Kings	Bangabandhu National Stadium, Dhaka
17:00 BST		Report	Becerra 49'	Referee: MD. Mizanur Rahman (Bangladesh)

==== Knockout phage ====
3 January 2021 Quarter-final	Bashundhara Kings	2–0	Sheikh Jamal Dhanmondi Club	Dhaka
16:00 BST	Becerra 10'; Robinho 89'	Report		Stadium: Bangabandhu National Stadium; Referee: Bitu Raj Barua (Bangladesh)

7 January 2021 Semi-final	Bashundhara Kings	3–1 (a.e.t.)	Dhaka Abahani	Dhaka
16:00 BST	Fernandes 51', 120+1'; Becerra 111'	Report	Wagsley 31'	Stadium: Bangabandhu National Stadium; Referee: Sujit Banarjee (Bangladesh)

10 January 2021 Final	Saif Sporting Club	0–1	Bashundhara Kings	Dhaka
16:00 BST		Report	Becerra 52'	Stadium: Bangabandhu National Stadium; Referee: Jalal Uddin (Bangladesh)

=== Premier League ===
==== League table ====
Pos	Team	Pld	W	D	L	GF	GA	GD	Pts	Qualification or relegation
1	Bashundhara Kings (C, Q)	24	21	2	1	60	10	+50	65	Qualification for AFC Cup Group stage
2	Sheikh Jamal DC (Note: Sheikh Jamal cannot qualify for Asian Football Confederation competitions as they were not granted an AFC Cup license for 2022.)	24	15	7	2	53	28	+25	52	
3	Dhaka Abahani (Q)	24	13	8	3	65	29	+36	47	Qualification for AFC Cup qualifying play-offs
4	Saif Sporting Club	24	14	2	8	48	37	+11	44	
5	Chittagong Abahani	24	13	5	6	38	28	+10	44	

Source: Soccerway
Rules for classification: 1) Points; 2) Goal difference; 3) Goals scored.
(C) Champions; (Q) Qualify for the AFC competition

==== Results summary ====
Overall								Home						Away					
Pld	W	D	L	GF	GA	GD	Pts	W	D	L	GF	GA	GD	W	D	L	GF	GA	GD
23	20	2	1	57	10	+47	62	9	1	1	28	6	+22	11	1	0	29	4	+25

Last updated: 20 September 2021.
Source: Soccerway

==== Results by round ====
Round	1	2	3	4	5	6	7	8	9	10	11	12	13	14	15	16	17	18	19	20	21	22	23	24	25	26	27
Ground	H	A	H	A	H	A	H	A	H	A	H	A	-	A	H	A	H	A	H	A	H	A	A	H			
Result	W	W	W	W	W	W	W	D	W	W	W	W	-	W	W	W	W	W	L	W	W	W	W	D			
Position	2	1	1	1	1	1	1	1	1	1	1	1	1	1	1	1	1	1	1	1	1	1	1	1			

Updated to match(es) played on 20 September 2021. Source: Matches
A = Away; H = Home; W = Win; D = Draw; L = Loss; P = Postponed

==== Matches ====
13 January 2021 Round 1	Bashundhara Kings	2–0	Uttar Baridhara	Dhaka
16:00 BST	Becerra 35'; Ibrahim 55'	Report		Stadium: Bangabandhu National Stadium

19 January 2021 Round 2	Bangladesh Police FC	1–2	Bashundhara Kings	Dhaka
15:30 BST	Touré 42'	Report	Robinho 16', 45+1'	Stadium: Bangabandhu National Stadium

23 January 2021 Round 3	Bashundhara Kings	1–0	Brothers Union	Cumilla
15:00 BST	Robinho 63'	Report		Stadium: Comilla Stadium

27 January 2021 Round 4	Rahmatganj MFS	0–3	Bashundhara Kings	Dhaka
18:00 BST		Report	Robinho 34'(P); Kiran 45+2'(O.G); Tawhidul Alam Sabuz 86'	Stadium: Bangabandhu National Stadium

1 February 2021 Round 5	Bashundhara Kings	4–1	Mohammedan	Comilla
15:00 BST	Becerra 10', 81'(P); Robinho 45+1'; Fernandes 50'	Report	Nurat 22'	Stadium: Comilla Stadium

5 February 2021 Round 6	Chittagong Abahani	0–1	Bashundhara Kings	Dhaka
15:00 BST		Report	Sufil 62'	Stadium: Bangabandhu National Stadium

8 February 2021 Round 7	Bashundhara Kings	3–0	Muktijoddha Sangsad KC	Comilla
15:00 BST	Robinho 9'; Becerra 44'; Sabuz 75'	Report		Stadium: Comilla Stadium

14 February 2021 Round 8	Sheikh Jamal DC	0–0	Bashundhara Kings	Dhaka
15:30 BST		Report		Stadium: Bangabandhu National Stadium

16 February 2021 Round 9	Bashundhara Kings	6–1	Arambagh KS	Comilla
15:00 BST	Becerra 3', 65', 74'; Robinho 32', 42', 77'	Report	Nihat 16'	Stadium: Comilla Stadium

20 February 2021 Round 10	Saif SC	1–2	Bashundhara Kings	Dhaka
15:30 BST	John Okoli 18'	Report	Tawhidul Alam Sabuz 34'; Robinho 37'	Stadium: Bangabandhu National Stadium

24 February 2021 Round 11	Bashundhara Kings	4 – 0	Sheikh Russel KC	Comilla
15:00 BST	Becerra 23', 74'; Robinho 42', 83'	Report		Stadium: Comilla Stadium

28 February 2021 Round 12	Dhaka Abahani	1–4	Bashundhara Kings	Dhaka
16:00 BST	Chowdhury (yellow card) 56'; Belfort 82' (P)	Report	Becerra 18', 76'; Khaled Shafiei 25'; Fernandes 51'; Biplu (yellow card) 73'	Stadium: Bangabandhu National Stadium

30 April 2021 Round 14	Uttar Baridhara	0–6	Bashundhara Kings	Dhaka
16:00 BST		Report	Becerra 3' 63' Fernandes 10' 55' Robinho 34' 90+1' (pen.) Biplu (yellow card) 28'	Stadium: Bangabandhu National Stadium; Referee: Arisuz Rahman Sagor

4 May 2021 Round 15	Bashundhara Kings	2–0	Police FC	Dhaka
19:00 BST	Robinho (penalty missed) 17; Shafiei (yellow card) 35'; Biplu (yellow card) 54'; Topu 58'; (yellow card) 84'; Sabuz 62'	Report	Joy (yellow card) 16'	Stadium: Bangabandhu National Stadium; Referee: Bituraj Barua

7 May 2021 Round 16	Brothers Union	1–5	Bashundhara Kings	Dhaka
21:00 BST	F. Hasanboev 36'; Awala (yellow card) 71'; Oriaku (yellow card) 79'	Report	Fernandes 21'; Robinho 45' 80'; Sabuz 59' 74'; M.Khan (yellow card) 83'	Stadium: Bangabandhu National Stadium; Referee: Symoon Hasan Sany

27 June 2021 Round 17	Bashundhara Kings	2–1	Rahmatganj MFS	Dhaka
17:00 BST	Eleta 29'; Becerra 44'; K.Shafeli (yellow card) 84'; T. Kazi (red card) 87'	Report	Remi 39'	Stadium: Bangabandhu National Stadium; Referee: Mohammed Jalaluddin

30 June 2021 Round 18	Dhaka Mohammedan	0–1	Bashundhara Kings	Dhaka
16:30 BST	Rana (yellow card) 19'; Suzan (red card) 20'; Atikuzzaman (yellow card) 38'; Diabate (yellow card) 52'; Masud Rana (yellow card) 54'	Report	Bishwanath Ghosh (yellow card) 18'; Khan (yellow card) 25' (yellow-red card) 76'; Becerra 90+4'	Stadium: Bangabandhu National Stadium; Referee: Jasim Akter

18 July 2021 Round 19	Bashundhara Kings	1–2	Chittagong Abahani	Dhaka
16:30 BST	T. Kazi (yellow card) 23'; Becerra (penalty missed) 50; Robinho 87'	Report	M. Chinedu 39', 89'; M. Nayeem (yellow card) 49'; Rakib (yellow card) 51'	Stadium: Bangabandhu National Stadium; Referee: Jasim Akhter

4 August 2021 Round 20	Muktijoddha Sangsad KC	0–3	Bashundhara Kings	Dhaka
16:00 BST	B. Famoussa (yellow card) 68'	Report	Robinho 20' Becerra 55' Fernandes 78'	Stadium: Bangabandhu National Stadium; Referee: Jalal Uddin

9 August 2021 Round 21	Bashundhara Kings	2–0	Sheikh Jamal DC	Dhaka
14:00 BST	B. Ghosh (yellow card) 14'; Robinho 21'; Fernandes 62'; A.Fahad (yellow card) 80'	Report	O.F. Babu (yellow card) 10'; P.O. Jobe (yellow card) 14'	Stadium: Bangabandhu National Stadium; Referee: Anisur Rahman

12 August 2021 Round 22	Arambagh KS	0–1	Bashundhara Kings	Dhaka
16:00 BST	R.Rony (yellow card) 84'; M. Molla (yellow card) 90+4'	Report	Biplu 88'; Ibrahim (yellow card) 90+4'	Stadium: BSSS Mostafa Kamal Stadium; Referee: Shohrab Hossain

14 September 2021 Round 23	Bashundhara Kings	3–0	Saif SC	Dhaka
16:00 BST (UTC+6)	Eleta 54' 63'; Tariq (yellow card) 70'; Robinho 80'	Report	Rafi (yellow card) 17'	Stadium: Bangabandhu National Stadium; Referee: Anisur Rahman
Note: This match was rescheduled from August to September due to Bashundhara Kings's 2021 AFC Cup group stage matches.

17 September 2021 Round 24	Sheikh Russel KC	0–1	Bashundhara Kings	Dhaka
16:00 BST		Report	Robinho 79' (pen.)	Stadium: Bangabandhu National Stadium; Referee: Mohammad Alamgir
Note: This match was rescheduled from August to September due to Bashundhara Kings's 2021 AFC Cup group stage matches.

20 September 2021 Round 25	Bashundhara Kings	1–1	Abahani Ltd. Dhaka	Dhaka
16:00 BST	Barman 37'	Report	Barman 28' (o.g.); M. Ridoy (yellow card) 36' Rayhan (yellow card) 81' S. Uddin (yellow card) 90+3'	Stadium: Bangabandhu National Stadium; Referee: Bituraj Barua
Note: This match was rescheduled from August to September due to Bashundhara Kings's 2021 AFC Cup group stage matches.

=== Group D ===
Pos	Team	Pld	W	D	L	GF	GA	GD	Pts	Qualification
1	(India) ATK Mohun Bagan	3	2	1	0	6	2	+4	7	Inter-zone play-off semi-finals
2	(Bangladesh) Bashundhara Kings	3	1	2	0	3	1	+2	5	
3	(India) Bengaluru	3	1	1	1	6	4	+2	4	
4	(Maldives) Maziya (H)	3	0	0	3	3	11	−8	0	

Source: AFC
Rules for classification: Tiebreakers
(H) Hosts

18 August 2021 2021 AFC Cup group stage	Bashundhara Kings (Bangladesh)	2–0	(Maldives) Maziya	Malé, Maldives
22:00 BST (UTC+6)	M.Irrufaan 25' (o.g.); Robinho 40'; Fahad (yellow card) 86'	Stats Report		Stadium: National Football Stadium; Referee: Ali Reda (Lebanon)

21 August 2021 2021 AFC Cup group stage	Bengaluru (India)	0−0	(Bangladesh) Bashundhara Kings	Malé, Maldives
17:00 BST (UTC+6)	Musavu-King (yellow card) 21'; Parag (yellow card) 41'	Live Report; Stats Report	Tariq (yellow card) 45'; Khaled (yellow card) 47'	Stadium: National Football Stadium; Referee: Thoriq Alkatiri (Indonesia)

24 August 2021 2021 AFC Cup group stage	ATK Mohun Bagan (India)	1–1	(Bangladesh) Bashundhara Kings	Malé, Maldives
17:00 UTC+6	Kotal (yellow card) 13'; Tangri (yellow card) 49'; Williams 62'	Stats Report	Becerra (yellow card) 6'; Bishwanath (yellow card) 20'; Fernandes 28' (yellow card) 80'; Zoni (yellow card) 39'; Fahad (yellow card) 45'; Sushanto (red card) 45+3'	Stadium: National Football Stadium; Referee: Qassim Al-Hatmi (Oman)

== Statistics ==
=== Goalscorers ===
As of match played till 20 September 2021

Rank	Player	Position	Total	BPL	AFC Cup	Federation Cup	Independence Cup
1	(Brazil) Robinho	FW	24	21	1	2	0
2	(Argentina) Raúl Becerra	FW	21	16	0	5	0
3	(Brazil) Fernandes	MF	10	7	1	2	0
4	(Bangladesh) Tawhidul Alam Sabuz	FW	6	6	0	0	0
5	(Bangladesh) Topu Barman	DF	2	0	0	0	
6	(Bangladesh) Mohammad Ibrahim	MF	1	1	0	0	0
6	(Bangladesh) Mahbubur Rahman Sufil	FW	1	1	0	0	0
6	(Bangladesh) Biplu Ahmed	MF	1	1	0	0	0
6	(Iran) Khaled Shafiei	DF	1	1	0	0	0
6	(Bangladesh) Eleta Kingsley	FW	1	1	0	0	0
Own goal			4	1	1	1	0
Total			71	58	3	10	0

Source: Matches
