= 2021–22 Sheikh Jamal Dhanmondi Club season =

Sheikh Jamal DC
2021–22 season
- Owner: Bashundhara Group
- President: Safwan Sobhan Tasvir
- Head coach: Joseph Afusi Saez
- Stadium: Munshigonj District Stadium
- Bangladesh Premier League: 4th
- Federation Cup: Quarter-finals
- Independence Cup: Quarter-finals
- Top goalscorer: League: Otabek Valizhonov; Solomon King Kanform (7 goals each); All: Solomon King Kanform; Otabek Valizhonov (8 goals each)
Home colours	Away colours

The 2021–22 season was Sheikh Jamal Dhanmondi Club's 60th season since its establishment in 1962 and its 11th competitive season in Bangladesh Premier League. In addition to the domestic league, Sheikh Jamal participated in the season's edition of the Federation Cup and Independence Cup. The season covered the period from 1 October 2021 to 30 July 2022.

== Season overview ==
=== November ===
On 27 November 2021 the club played first match of the season against Bangladesh Air Force and got victory by 3–0. Scorers of the match Otabek Valijonov, Solomon King Kanform and Sohanur Rahman.

=== December ===
On 1 December Sheikh Jamal DC has played second match of their group and ended the match goalless.

On 5 December Sheikh Jamal DC have played against Sheikh Russel KC last match of their group B of 2021–22 Independence Cup (Bangladesh) and draw 1–1 goals. On 26 minutes Jamal defender Sahin Mia goal took lead but after two minutes Sheikh Russel KC Guinean forward Esmaël Gonçalves goal scored level. After second half both teams footballers does not found the net.

On 12 December Sheikh Jamal DC defeated to Bashundhara Kings by 0–4. In the first half were played scoreless second half 58 minutes Motin Mia Bashundhara Kings took lead and two goals scored by Brazilian star Jonathan Fernandez 73 & 81 & last on 90+4 minutes by Alamgir Kabir Rana made its 4–0. Sheikh Jamal DC eliminated from the tournament.

On 26 December Sheikh Jamal DC 3-0 goals against Muktijoddha Sangsad KC by FIFA Walkover laws. The match scheduled to play but opposition team withdrew their name from the tournament and Jamal awarded winner with 3 point.

On 30 December Sheikh Jamal DC draw 1–1 against Rahmatganj MFS. On 7 minutes Nurul Absar goal took lead Sheikh Jamal DC and they have finished first half with lead. In the second half additional time 90+1 minutes goal by Sajidur Rahman Sajid equal the scored. Due to Muktijoddha Sangsad KC withdrawn both teams points were equal in the group stage and referee were used penalty shoot out to the determined group champion which Sheikh Jamal DC won 5–0 goals.

=== January ===
On 3 January Sheikh Jamal DC lost 6–0 goals against Dhaka Abahani. In the first half on 22 minutes goal by Dorielton and 35 Raphael Augusto took lead Abahani and go to half time break. In the second half on 62 Dorielton made it 3–0. In the 70 minutes Daniel Colindres found the net. Nabib Newaj Jibon on 81 and 90+1 minutes double Dhaka Abahai thrashed Sheikh Jamal DC 6–0. Sheikh Jamal DC eliminated from the tournament with huge lost.

=== February ===
On 3 February Sheikh Jamal DC played their home match against Uttar Baridhara Club an won by 2–1 goals. On 12 minutes Gambian forward Sulayman Sillah and Nigerian forward Matthew Chinedu goals on 45 minutes took the lead before half time. Uttar Baridhara Uzbekistan Midfielder Evgeniy Kochnev penalty goal on 68 minutes ended the match 2–1.

On 8 February Sheikh Jamal DC won away match by 3–0 against Muktijoddha Sangsad KC. In the first half on 20 minutes a goal by Solomon King Kanform made score 1–0 and on 35 minutes a goal by Matthew Chinedu made score 2–0 before finished half time break. In the second half on 57 minutes a goals by Matthew Chinedu scoreline made 3–0. Muktijoddha Sangsad KC players would able to score any goal against Sheikh Jamal DC until ended the game. Sheikh Jamal DC graved the victory with 3–0.

On 12 February Sheikh Jamal DC met Bangladesh Police FC in the home match and finished it goalless 0–0. In the first half both teams play excellent and ended it goalless. In the second half both teams started playing attacking football to take lead but they found any goals. On 81 minutes Uzbekistan Otabek Valizhazov showed red card due to bad fouls. Last 19 minutes Sheikh Jamal DC played with 10 men's squad but Police FC could not able to score any goal.

On 17 February Sheikh Jamal DC drew 3–3 against Rahmatganj MFS in away match. In the first half on 23 minutes Gambian forward Solomon King Kanform goal took lead and his second goals on 43 minutes finished halftime with lead 2–0. In the second half on 68 minutes Tajikistan forward Siyovush Asrorov goal made scoreline 2–1. Afternoon 6 minutes a goal by Mohammed Atikuzzaman lead the score 3–1 but the lead was retained till 89 minutes before score Sunday Chizoba on 90 minutes and Lancine Touré on 90+4 minutes. End the match with result 3–3 goals.

On 23 February Sheikh Jamal DC defeated 1–0 goal Sheikh Russel KC at home ground. In the first half on 33 minutes Nigerian forward Matthew Chinedu goal took lead and finished halftime with 1–0 lead. In the second half both teama play goalless and Sheikh Jamal DC secured win with 3 points.

=== March ===
On 6 March Sheikh Jamal DC defeated by 2–1 goals Chittagong Abahani at home ground.

On 11 March Sheikh Jamal DC have drew 2–2 goals against Saif Sporting Club in the away game.

=== April ===
On 3 April Sheikh Jamal DC won against Swadhinata KS by 3–1 goals at in the away game. In the first half on 29 and 38 minutes Nigerian Matthew Chinedu goal Sheikh Jamal DC took lead and finished first half 0–2. In the second half on 53 minutes Nedo Turković goal made score 1–2. But Swadhinata KS could not able to avoid their defeat Matthew Chinedu hat trick goals on 67 minutes secured huge victory for Sheikh Jamal DC.

On 24 April Sheikh Jamal DC have defeated Uttar Baridhara Club by 2–0 goals at in the away game. In the first half on 2 minutes new signed Nigerian forward Chijoke Alaekwe give lead for Sheikh Jamal DC and on 21 minutes Nigerian another forward Musa Najare score on 21 minutes and they have finished half time. In the second half both teams played excellent and defensive football and end of time Sheikh Jamal DC score remains 2–0 goals.

On 29 April Sheikh Jamal DC won by 2–1 against Muktijoddha Sangsad KC at home ground. In the first half on 28 minutes Nigerian forward Musa Najare opened account for Sheikh Jamal DC and they have got clean lead in the first half. In the second half on 66 minutes Sheikh Jamal DC Gambian forward Solmon King Kanform goals made scoreless 2–0 but after 4 minutes on 70 Muktijoddha Sangsad KC Guinean Defender Abubocar Baki Camara reduced score to 2–1. End of 90+ minutes Sheikh Jamal DC left the ground with full three points.

=== May ===
On 7 May Sheikh Jamal DC defeated to Bangladesh Police FC by 0–1 goal at away game.

On 12 May Sheikh Jamal DC have won by 1–0 goal in the home game against Rahmatganj MFS.

=== June ===
On 21 June Sheikh Jamal DC have lost to Sheikh Russel KC by 1–3 goals in the away game.

On 27 June Sheikh Jamal DC defeated against Dhaka Mohammedan by 1–3 goals in the away game.

=== July ===
On 3 July Sheikh Jamal DC got victory versus Chittagong Abahani by 2–0 goals in the away game.

On 8 July Sheikh Jamal DC have drawn against Saif Sporting Club by 2–2 goals at home venue.

On 19 July Sheikh Jamal DC have lost against Dhaka Abahani by 0–5 goals in the away game.

On 26 July Sheikh Jamal DC have drew against Swadhinata KS by 2–2 goals at home ground.

On 30 July Sheikh Jamal DC have lost to Bashundhara Kings by 1–2 goals at home stadium.

== Current squad ==
Lt. Sheikh Jamal Dhanmondi Club Limited Squad for 2021–22 season.

As of 18 November 2021

Note: Flags indicate national team as defined under FIFA eligibility rules; some limited exceptions apply. Players may hold more than one non-FIFA nationality.

No.	Pos.	Nation	Player
1	GK	BAN	Mitul Marma
2	DF	BAN	Raihan Hasan
3	DF	BAN	Ariful Islam
4	DF	BAN	Yeasin Khan
5	DF	BAN	Mohamed Atikuzzaman
6	DF	BAN	Mojammel Hossain Nira
7	MF	BAN	Rahbar Wahed Khan
8	FW	UZB	Otabek Valijonov
9	FW	NGR	Matthew Chinedu
10	FW	GAM	Solomon King Kanform
11	FW	GAM	Sulayman Sillah
12	FW	BAN	Jabed Khan
13	MF	BAN	Mazharul Islam Sourav
14	MF	BAN	Sohanur Rahman
15	MF	BAN	Mohammad Shagor
16	DF	BAN	Sohel Rana
17	MF	BAN	Faysal Ahmed

No.	Pos.	Nation	Player
18	MF	BAN	Omar Faruk Babu
19	FW	BAN	Rashedul Islam Shuvo
20	FW	BAN	Nurul Absar
21	DF	BAN	Shakil Ahmed
22	GK	BAN	Samiul Islam Masum
23	GK	BAN	Miraj Hawlader
24	DF	BAN	Rofiqur Rahman Mamun
25	MF	BAN	Shafiqul Islam Bipul
26	MF	BAN	Ali Hossain
27	DF	BAN	Shamol Miah
28	DF	BAN	Arman Sadi
29	DF	BAN	Shahin Ahammad
30	GK	BAN	Mohammad Nayem
31	DF	BAN	Rifat Hasan Sarthok
32	MF	BAN	Tawhid Hasan
33	FW	BAN	Mehedi Hasan Hridoy

== Pre-season friendly ==
18 November 2021	Muktijoddha Sangsad KC	1–0	Sheikh Jamal DC	Dhanmondi
14:00 UTC+6	Md Roman 19'	Report		Stadium: Dhanmondi Football Ground

22 November 2021	Sheikh Jamal DC	2–0	Chittagong Abahani	Dhanmondi
14:00 UTC+6	Goal			Stadium: Dhanmondi Football Ground

23 January 2022	Sheikh Jamal DC	3–4	Swadhinata KS	Dhanmondi
13:00 UTC+6			Ziarur 3'; Shamim 32'; Nedo 67'; Zaheed 89'	Stadium: Dhanmondi Football Ground

== Transfer ==
=== In ===
No.	Pos	Player	Previous club	Fee	Date	Source
5	DF	(Bangladesh) Manjurul Islam Manik	(Bangladesh) Chittagong Abahani	Free transfer	28 August 2021	
33	GK	(Bangladesh) Mohammed Nayeem	(Bangladesh) Chittagong Abahani	Free transfer	18 September 2021	
7	MF	(Bangladesh) Rahbar Wahed Khan	(Canada) North Toronto Nitros	Free transfer	30 October 2021	
20	FW	(Panama) José Alexander Hernandez	(Panama) Veraguas Club Deportivo	Free transfer	18 November 2021	
17	FW	(Nigeria) Ifeanyi Eze	(Nigeria) Kano Pillars FC	Not disclosed	14 April 2022	
24	FW	(Nigeria) Chijioke Alaekwe	(Nigeria) Nasarawa United FC	Not disclosed	14 April 2022	
14	FW	(Nigeria) Musa Tachi Najare	(Nigeria) Gombe United	Not disclosed	19 April 2022	

=== Out ===
No.	Pos	Player	Transferred to	Fee	Date	Source
19	DF	(Bangladesh) Md Monir Hossain	(Bangladesh) Dhaka Abahani	Free transfer	18 September 2021	
21	DF	(Bangladesh) Shakil Ahmed	(Bangladesh) Muktijoddha Sangsad KC	Free transfer	20 September 2021	
24	DF	(Bangladesh) Md Alauddin	(Bangladesh) Dhaka Mohammedan	Free transfer	16 October 2021	
7	MF	(Bangladesh) Mohamed Zahid Hossain	(Bangladesh) Chittagong Abahani	Free transfer	20 November 2021	
–	MF	(Bangladesh) Monsur Amin	(Bangladesh) Bashundhara Kings	Not disclosed	21 April 2022	

=== Released ===
No.	Position	Player	Date	Source
9	FW	(Nigeria) Matthew Chinedu	21 April 2022	
11	FW	(The Gambia) Suleyman Sillah	21 April 2022	

== Competitions ==
Win Draw Loss Fixtures

=== Overall ===
Competition	First match	Last match	Final Position
BPL	3 February 2022	30 July 2022	4th
Federation Cup	26 December 2021	3 January 2022	Quarter-finals
Independence Cup	27 November 2021	12 December 2021	Quarter-finals

=== Overview ===
Competition	Record							
Competition	Pld	W	D	L	GF	GA	GD	Win %
BPL	20	9	7	4	31	37	−6	45.00
Independence Cup	4	1	2	1	4	5	−1	25.00
Federation Cup	3	1	1	1	4	7	−3	33.33
Total	27	11	10	6	39	49	−10	40.74

Last updated: 19 July 2022
Source: Competitions

=== Independence Cup ===
==== Group B ====
Pos	Team	Pld	W	D	L	GF	GA	GD	Pts	Status
1	Sheikh Russel KC	3	2	1	0	4	1	+3	7	Qualified for Knockout stage
2	Sheikh Jamal DC	3	1	2	0	4	1	+3	5	Qualified for Knockout stage
3	Uttar Baridhara Club	3	0	2	1	1	2	−1	2	
4	Bangladesh Air Force	3	0	1	2	1	6	−5	1	

Source: Global Sports Archive
Rules for classification: Group stage tiebreakers

27 November 2021	Sheikh Jamal DC	3–0	Bangladesh Air Force	Dhaka
18:00	Otabek 16'; Solomon King 52'; Sohanur 54'	Report		Stadium: BSSS Mostafa Kamal Stadium; Referee: Saimon Hasan Sany

1 December 2021	Uttar Baridhara Club	0–0	Sheikh Jamal DC	Dhaka
18:00		Report		Stadium: BSSS Mostafa Kamal Stadium; Referee: GM Chowdhury Nayon

5 December 2021	Sheikh Jamal DC	1–1	Sheikh Russel KC	Dhaka
18:00	Shahin 26'	Report	Esmaël 28'	Stadium: BSSS Mostafa Kamal Stadium; Referee: Md Saymoon Hasan Sany

==== Knockout stage ====
12 December 2021 Quarter-finals	Bashundhara Kings	4–0	Sheikh Jamal DC	Dhaka
20:00 BST (UTC+6)	Motin 58'; Fernandes 73', 81'; SK Rana 90+4'	Report		Stadium: BSSS Mostafa Kamal Stadium; Referee: Saimoon Hasan Sany

=== Federation Cup ===
==== Group D ====
Pos	Team	Pld	W	D	L	GF	GA	GD	Pts	Status
1	Sheikh Jamal DC	2	1	1	0	4	1	+3	4 (Note: As the fair play points of the two teams were equal, the group champion and runners-up were determined through a penalty shootout. Sheikh Jamal DC (5–4) Rahmatganj MFS.)	Advance to Knockout stage
2	Rahmatganj MFS	2	1	1	0	4	1	+3	4	Advance to Knockout stage
3	Muktijoddha Sangsad KS	2	0	0	2	0	6	−6	0	Later withdrew

Source: Soccerway
Rules for classification: Group stage tiebreakers
Notes:

26 December 2022	Muktijoddha Sangsad KC	0–3; Walkover	Sheikh Jamal DC	Dhaka
18:45 BST (UTC+6)		Report		Stadium: BSSS Mostafa Kamal Stadium; Referee: Bhubon Mohon Torafder
Note: Sheikh Jamal DC were awarded walkover win by 3 goals since Muktijoddha Sangsad KC did not turn up for the match

30 December 2022	Rahmatganj MFS	1–1 (4–5 p)	Sheikh Jamal DC	Dhaka
16:00 BST (UTC+6)	Sajidur 90+1'	Report	Absar 7'	Stadium: BSSS Mostafa Kamal Stadium; Referee: Saymoon Hasan Sany

==== Knockout stage ====
3 January 2022 Quarter-finals	Sheikh Jamal DC	0–6	Dhaka Abahani	Dhaka
19:30 BST (UTC+6)		Report	Dorielton 22', 62'; Raphael 35' (pen.): Colindres 70'; Nabib 81', 90+1'	Stadium: BSSS Mostafa Kamal Stadium; Referee: Md Mizanur Rahman

=== Premier League ===
==== League table ====
Pos	Team	Pld	W	D	L	GF	GA	GD	Pts	Qualification or relegation
2	Dhaka Abahani (Q)	22	14	5	3	55	31	+24	47	Qualification for 2023 AFC Cup Play-off round
3	Saif Sporting Club	22	11	4	7	58	37	+21	37	
4	Sheikh Jamal DC	22	9	8	5	34	31	+3	35	
5	Dhaka Mohammedan	22	8	9	5	39	26	+13	33	
6	Sheikh Russel KC	22	8	7	7	35	31	+4	31	

Source: Soccerway
Rules for classification: 1) Points; 2) Goal difference; 3) Goals scored.
(Q) Qualify for the AFC competition

==== Results summary ====
Overall								Home						Away					
Pld	W	D	L	GF	GA	GD	Pts	W	D	L	GF	GA	GD	W	D	L	GF	GA	GD
22	9	8	5	34	31	+3	35	5	5	1	14	10	+4	4	3	4	20	21	−1

Source: Soccerway

==== Results by round ====
Round	1	2	3	4	5	6	7	8	9	10	11	12	13	14	15	16	17	18	19	20	21	22
Ground	H	A	H	A	H	H	H	A	H	A	A	A	H	A	H	A	A	A	H	A	H	H
Result	W	W	D	D	W	D	W	D	D	W	D	W	W	L	W	L	L	W	D	L	D	L
Position	2	1	1	3	3	3	3	3	3	2	2	3	3	3	3	4	4	4	4	4	4	4

Source: Matches
A = Away; H = Home; W = Win; D = Draw; L = Loss; P = Postponed

=== Matches ===
3 February 2022 1	Sheikh Jamal DC	2–1	Uttar Baridhara Club	Munshigonj
15:00 BST (UTC+6)	S. Sillah 12'; R. Hasan (yellow card) 36'; M.Chinedu 45'; O. Valizhonov (yellow card) 45'	Report	Y. Kochnev 68' (pen.); S. Fozilov (yellow card) 88'	Stadium: Munshigonj District Stadium; Referee: Bituraj Barua

8 February 2022 2	Muktijoddha Sangsad KC	0–3	Sheikh Jamal DC	Gazipur
15:00 BST (UTC+6)	I. Shakil (yellow card) 57'; M. Nipu (yellow card) 63'		S. Kanform 20'; O. Babu (yellow card) 29'; M. Chinedu 37', 55'	Stadium: Shaheed Ahsan Ullah Master Stadium; Referee: Md Alamgir Sarker

12 February 2022 3	Sheikh Jamal DC	0–0	Bangladesh Police FC	Munshigonj
15:00 BST (UTC+6)	Yeasin (yellow card) 57'; Valizhonov (yellow card) 79' (yellow-red card) 81'	Report	Rashedul (yellow card) 24'; Faisal (yellow card) 63'; Danilo (yellow card) 79'	Stadium: Munshigonj District Stadium; Referee: Golam Mourshed Chowdhury

17 February 2022 4	Rahmatganj MFS	3–3	Sheikh Jamal DC	Sylhet
15:00 BST (UTC+6)	Rabby (yellow card) 25'; Sanoar (yellow card) 42'; Rakibul (yellow card) 71'; Asrorov 68' (yellow card) 76'; Sunday 90'; Touré 90+4'	Report	Solomon King 22', 43'; Yeasin (yellow card) 45+1'; Atikuzzaman 74'	Stadium: Sylhet District Stadium; Referee: Mahmud Jamal Faruquee Nahid

23 February 2022 5	Sheikh Jamal DC	1–0	Sheikh Russel KC	Munshigonj
15:00 BST (UTC+6)	Chinedu 33' (yellow card) 90'; Mazharul (yellow card) 61'	Report	Dipok (yellow card) 10'; Akmatov (yellow card) 54'	Stadium: Munshigonj District Stadium; Referee: Mahmud Jamal Faruqee Nahid

28 February 2022 6	Sheikh Jamal DC	1–1	Dhaka Mohammedan	Munshigonj
15:00 BST (UTC+6)	Shakil (yellow card) 14'; Solomon King 32'; Ariful (yellow card) 71'	Report	Diabate 45+2'; Shamol (yellow card) 49'; Abid (yellow card) 69'	Stadium: Munshigonj District Stadium; Referee: Golam Mourshed Chowdhury

6 March 2022 7	Sheikh Jamal DC	2–1	Chittagong Abahani	Munshigonj
15:30 BST (UTC+6)	Solomon King 29', 68'; Nayeem (yellow card) 90'	Report	Peter 83' (yellow card) 90+2'	Stadium: Munshigonj District Stadium; Referee: Md Mizanur Rahman

11 March 2022 8	Saif Sporting Club	2–2	Sheikh Jamal DC	Munshigonj
15:30 BST (UTC+6)	Jintu (yellow card) 50'; Udoh 90+2', 90+6' (yellow card) 95'	Report	Valizonov 50'; Shahin (yellow card) 50'; Solomon King (yellow card) 75'; Sillah 90+6'	Stadium: Munshigonj District Stadium; Referee: Golam Murshed Chowdhury Nayon

16 March 2022 9	Sheikh Jamal DC	0–0	Dhaka Abahani	Munshigonj
15:30 BST (UTC+6)	Shahin (yellow card) 19'; Ariful (yellow card) 70'; Valijonov (yellow card) 70'	Report	Sushanto (yellow card) 45'	Stadium: Munshigonj District Stadium; Referee: Md Anisur Rahman

3 April 2022 10	Swadhinata KS	1–3	Sheikh Jamal DC	Rajshahi
15:30 BST (UTC+6)	Nedo 53'	Report	Chinedu 29', 38', 67'; Sillah (yellow card) 42'	Stadium: Rajshahi District Stadium; Referee: Bhubon Mohon Tarofder

7 April 2022 11	Bashundhara Kings	3–3	Sheikh Jamal DC	Dhaka
15:30 BST (UTC+6)	Vranješ (yellow card) 48' (goal) 76'; Ibrahim (yellow card) 53'; Rimon (yellow card) 54'; Robinho (yellow card) 75'; Kingsley 89', 90+1'		Valizonov (yellow card) 50' (goal) 71'; Shakil (yellow card) 75'; Sillah 83'; Kanform 85'	Stadium: Bashundhara Kings Arena; Referee: Golam Mourshed Chowdhury Nayon

24 April 2022 12	Uttar Baridhara Club	0–2	Sheikh Jamal DC	Gopalganj
15:00 BST (UTC+6)		Report	Alaekwe 2'; Najare 21'	Stadium: Sheikh Fazlul Haque Mani Stadium; Referee: Bituraj Barua

29 April 2022 13	Sheikh Jamal DC	2–1	Muktijoddha Sangsad KC	Munshigonj
15:30 BST (UTC+6)	Najare 28'; Kanform 66'; Valizonov (yellow card) 74'	Report	Camara 70'; Tareq (yellow card) 70'; Fahim (yellow card) 90+5'	Stadium: Munshigonj District Stadium; Referee: Mizanur Rahman

7 May 2022 14	Bangladesh Police FC	1–0	Sheikh Jamal DC	Rajshahi
15:45 BST (UTC+6)	Bablu 62'	Report	Shakil (yellow card) 90+4'	Stadium: Rajshahi District Stadium; Referee: Mizanur Rahman

12 May 2022 15	Sheikh Jamal DC	1–0	Rahmatganj MFS	Munshigonj
15:45 BST (UTC+6)	Najere 6'; Rayhan (yellow card) 86'		Sunday (yellow card) 45+3'; Asrorov (yellow card) 45+4'	Stadium: Munshigonj District Stadium; Referee: Bituraj Barua

21 June 2022 16	Sheikh Russel KC	3–1	Sheikh Jamal DC	Dhaka
16:00 BST (UTC+6)	Hemanta 24'; Brossou 45+1'; Didarul (yellow card) 78'; Rabby 87'; Gadze (yellow card) 88'		Otabek 42'; Najere (yellow card) 79'	Stadium: Bashundhara Kings Arena; Referee: Mohammed Jalal Uddin

27 June 2022 17	Dhaka Mohammedan	3–1	Sheikh Jamal DC	Comilla
15:30 BST (UTC+6)	Morsalin 34' (yellow card) 74'; Diabate 38', 43', 83' (o.g.); Jasmin (yellow card) 65'	Report	Solomon King (yellow card) 80'	Stadium: Comilla Stadium; Referee: Bituraj Barua

3 July 2022 18	Chittagong Abahani	0–2	Sheikh Jamal DC	Cumilla
15:30 BST (UTC+6)	Soeb (yellow card) 45+5'; Peter Ebi (penalty missed) 90+1'	Report	Otabek 28', 78'; Ariful (yellow card) 81'	Stadium: Shaheed Dhirendranath Datta Stadium; Referee: Bituraj Barua

8 July 2022 19	Sheikh Jamal DC	2–2	Saif Sporting Club	Munshigonj
15:30 BST (UTC+6)	Faysal (yellow card) 19'; Sohanur 37'; Otabek 90+4' (pen.)	Report	Riyadul (yellow card) 42'; Meraj (yellow card) 50'; Sazzad (yellow card) 65'; Emery 76' (pen.); Jamal (yellow card) 84'; Gafurov 90+1'	Stadium: Munshigonj District Stadium; Referee: Md Alamgir Sarker

19 July 2022 20	Dhaka Abahani	5–0	Sheikh Jamal DC	Comilla
16:00 BST (UTC+6)	Emon 8'; Raphael 38'; Colindres 42'; Al-Amin (yellow card) 64'; Jibon 77', 82'	Report		Stadium: Comilla District Stadium; Referee: Mohamad Alamgir

26 July 2022 21	Sheikh Jamal DC	2–2	Swadhinata KS	Munshigonj
16:00 BST (UTC+6)	Otabek 70'; Alaekwe (yellow card) 23' (goal) 90+1'	Report	Ekbal 26'; Shakil (yellow card) 45'; Zillur 49'	Stadium: Munshigonj District Stadium; Referee: Bituraj Barua

30 July 2022 22	Sheikh Jamal DC	1–2	Bashundhara Kings	Dhaka
16:00 BST (UTC+6)	Babu (yellow card) 23'; Sohanur 68'; Otabek (yellow card) 45' (yellow-red card) 82'	Report	Motin 8'; Fahad (yellow card) 21'; Robinho 39'; Bishwanath (red card) 90+7'	Stadium: Bashundhara Kings Arena; Referee: Alamgir Sarker

== Statistics ==
=== Goalscorers ===
As of match played till 30 July 2022

Rank	Player	Position	Total	BPL	Independence Cup	Federation Cup
1	(The Gambia) Solomon King Konform	FW	8	7	1	0
1	(Uzbekistan) Otabek Valizhonov	FW	8	7	1	0
2	(Nigeria) Matthew Chinedu	FW	7	7	0	0
3	(Bangladesh) Sohanur Rahman	MF	3	2	1	0
3	(The Gambia) Sulayman Sillah	FW	3	3	0	0
3	(Nigeria) Musa Tachi Najare	FW	3	3	0	0
4	(Nigeria) Chijioke Aleakwe	FW	2	2	0	0
5	(Bangladesh) Mohamed Atikuzzaman	DF	1	1	0	0
5	(Bangladesh) Nurul Absar	FW	1	0	0	1
5	(Bangladesh) Shahin Ahammad	DF	1	0	1	0
Total			37	32	4	1

Source: Matches
