= Rahbar Khan =

Bangladeshi football and futsal player (born 1996)

Personal information
- Full name: Md Rahbar Wahed Khan
- Date of birth: 6 March 1996 (age 30)
- Place of birth: Dhaka, Bangladesh
- Height: 5 ft 8 in (1.73 m)
- Position: Midfielder

College career
Years	Team	Apps	(Gls)
2014–2017	Siena Heights Saints	56	(14)

Senior career*
Years	Team	Apps	(Gls)
2021	North Toronto Nitros	2	(0)
2021–2022	Sheikh Jamal DC	0	(0)
Total		2	(0)

International career^{‡}
2021	Bangladesh	2	(0)
2025–	Bangladesh (futsal)	9	(5)
- * Club domestic league appearances and goals as of 21 April 2022 ‡ National team caps and goals as of 24 January 2026

Md Rahbar Wahed Khan (born 6 March 1996), also known as Sharan Khan, is a Bangladeshi footballer and futsal player. He played as a midfielder for the Bangladesh national football team and currently serves as the captain of the Bangladesh national futsal team.

== Early life ==
Khan attended school at Bangladesh International Tutorial, where he was named captain of the U14 football team. He began playing underground football at the age of eleven and played for teams such as DOHS United and Seven Nations Army.

== College career ==
In 2014, Khan began attending Siena Heights University, playing for the soccer team, on a 25% scholarship. He scored his first goal in his second season, against Grace Christian University on 15 September 2015. He became the captain of the team, was named the Player of the Year award in 2016 and 2017. In his senior season, he scored a career-high seven goals, including a hat trick against the Cornerstone Golden Eagles on 14 October 2017. In 2017, he earned All-WHAC honours, was the WHAC men's soccer offensive player of the week twice, earned WHAC All-Academic honours (which he also earned in 2016) and was named an NAIA Scholar-Athlete. The university also offered him a job as an assistant coach.

== Club career ==
Khan was contacted by two clubs in the Bangladesh Premier League, but he turned them down as his dream was to play in Europe.

In 2021, he played with the North Toronto Nitros in the Canadian League1 Ontario. He made his debut on 31 July, against Master's FA.

On 30 October 2021, he signed for Bangladesh Premier League club Sheikh Jamal DC. He made his official debut on 27 November in an Independence Cup match against the Bangladesh Air Force, recording an assist in a 3–0 victory. After suffering lateral meniscus and ACL injuries earlier in the season, he requested and was granted his release from the club in April 2022, choosing to return to Canada to rehab the injury that would keep him out for the season.

== International career ==
=== Football ===
In August 2021, Khan was called up to the Bangladesh national team for the 2021 Three Nations Cup in Kyrgyzstan. His father said Rahbar resigned from his job in Canada, in order to accept the call-up. On 5 September, he made his debut, against Palestine. He made his first start two days later against Kyrgyzstan.

=== Futsal ===
In 2025, Khan was selected for the inaugural Bangladesh national futsal team, being named team captain ahead of the team's international debut at the 2026 AFC Futsal Asian Cup qualification.

He scored his first international futsal goal against India, netting a brace in that match.

== Career statistics ==
As of 12 December 2021

Appearances and goals by club, season and competition
Club	Season	League			Domestic Cup		Other		Total	
Club	Season	Division	Apps	Goals	Apps	Goals	Apps	Goals	Apps	Goals
North Toronto Nitros	2021	League1 Ontario	2	0	–		–		2	0
Sheikh Jamal DC	2021–22	Bangladesh Premier League	0	0	2 (Note: Appearance(s) in Bangladesh Federation Cup)	0	4 (Note: Appearance(s) in Independence Cup)	0	6	0
Career total			2	0	2	0	4	0	8	0
