= Rimon Hossain =

Bangladeshi footballer (born 2005)

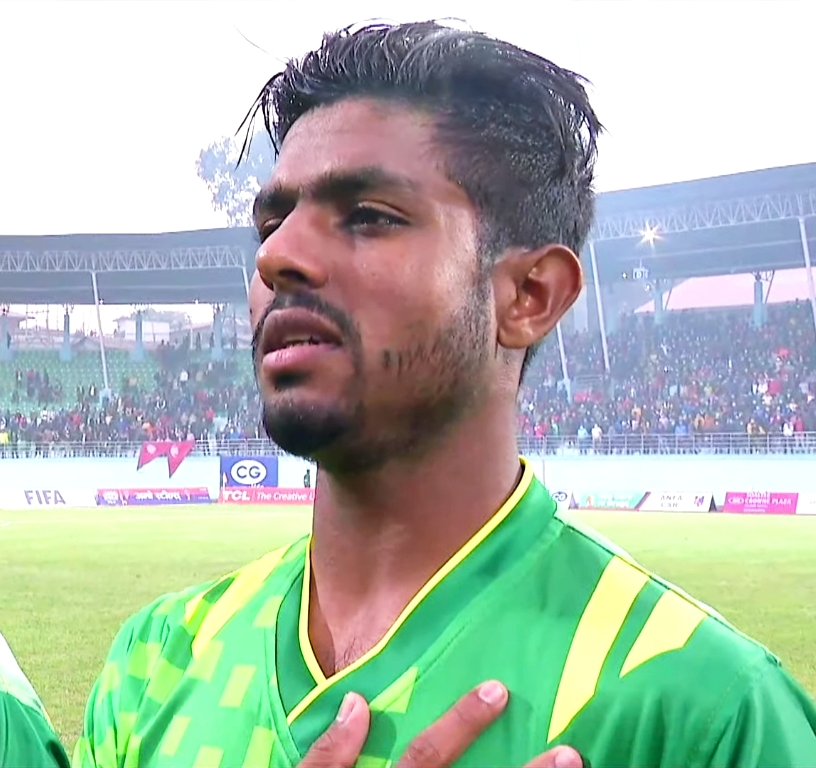
- Rimon with Bangladesh in 2021

Personal information
- Date of birth: 1 July 2005 (age 21)
- Place of birth: Naogaon, Bangladesh
- Height: 1.78 m (5 ft 10 in)
- Positions: Left-back; right-back

Team information
- Current team: Bashundhara Kings
- Number: 71

Youth career
- 2015–2017: Bashundhara Kings Pioneer
- 2018: Dhaka Abahani U-18

Senior career*
Years	Team	Apps	(Gls)
2019–	Bashundhara Kings	71	(1)

International career^{‡}
2025–	Bangladesh U23	5	(0)
2021–	Bangladesh	14	(0)
- * Club domestic league appearances and goals as of 21:00, 10 December 2024 (UTC) ‡ National team caps and goals as of 21:00, 9 September 2025 (UTC)

Mohammad Rimon Hossain (Bengali: মোহাম্মাদ রিমন হোসাইন; born 1 July 2005) is a Bangladeshi professional footballer who plays as a full-back for Bangladesh Premier League club Bashundhara Kings and the Bangladesh national team.

== International career ==
In March 2021, Rimon was called up to the senior Bangladesh national team for the 2021 Three Nations Cup.

Before his full international debut, Rimon played a match against Kyrgyzstan U-23 for Bangladesh.

On 29 March 2021, Rimon made his senior debut against Nepal in 2021 Three Nations Cup.

== Career statistics ==
=== International ===
As of 8 June 2022

Bangladesh
Year	Apps	Goals
2021	3	0
2022	4	0
Total	7	0

=== Club ===
As of 12 May 2022.

Club	Season	League			Domestic Cup (Note: Appearance(s) in Bangladesh Federation Cup)		Other (Note: Appearance(s) in Bangladesh Independence Cup)		Continental		Total	
Club	Season	Division	Apps	Goals	Apps	Goals	Apps	Goals	Apps	Goals	Apps	Goals
Bashundhara Kings	2019–20	Bangladesh Premier League	5	0	2	0	0	0	0	0	7	0
Bashundhara Kings	2020–21	Bangladesh Premier League	16	0	5	0	0	0	0	0	21	0
Bashundhara Kings	2021–22	Bangladesh Premier League	13	0	0	0	1	0	3 (Note: Appearance(s) in AFC Cup)	0	17	0
Career total			34	0	7	0	1	0	3	0	45	0

== Honours ==
Bashundhara Kings

- Bangladesh Premier League: 2020–21, 2021–22, 2022–23, 2023–24
- Independence Cup: 2022–23, 2023–24; runner-up: 2021-22
- Federation Cup: 2019–20, 2020–21; third place: 2022–23
