= Yassan Ouatching =

Cameroonian-born Central African footballer

Personal information
- Date of birth: 28 November 1998 (age 27)
- Place of birth: Douala, Cameroon
- Height: 1.89 m (6 ft 2 in)
- Position: Striker

Senior career*
Years	Team	Apps	(Gls)
–2017	UMS		
2017–2018	YOSA		
2019	Zwekapin United		
2021	Mohammedan (Dhaka)	12	(4)
2022–2023	Hearts of Oak	13	(0)

International career
2022–	Central African Republic	1	(0)
- * Club domestic league appearances and goals

Yassan Ouatching (born 28 November 1998) is a professional footballer who plays as a striker. Born in Cameroon, he represents the Central African Republic national team.

== Career ==
In 2019, Ouatching signed for Burmese side Zwekapin United. In 2021, he signed for Mohammedan (Dhaka) in Bangladesh. In 2022, he signed for Ghanaian club Hearts of Oak.
