= Mohamed Atikuzzaman =

Bangladeshi footballer (born 1999)

Atikuzzaman
Personal information
- Full name: Mohamed Atikuzzaman
- Date of birth: 10 October 1999 (age 27)
- Place of birth: Sherpur, Bangladesh
- Height: 1.81 m (5 ft 11 in)
- Positions: Right-back; center-back

Team information
- Current team: Dhaka Rangers
- Number: 40

Senior career*
Years	Team	Apps	(Gls)
2016–2017	Victoria SC	11	(1)
2017–2019	Arambagh KS	9	(0)
2019–2021	Mohammedan SC	23	(1)
2021–2022	Sheikh Jamal DC	8	(1)
2022–2023	Bashundhara Kings	0	(0)
2023	→ Muktijoddha Sangsad (loan)	1	(1)
2023–2024	Sheikh Jamal DC	0	(0)
2024–2025	Chittagong Abahani	5	(0)
2025–	Dhaka Rangers	0	(0)

International career^{‡}
2013–2015	Bangladesh U17	8	(2)
2017	Bangladesh U20	1	(0)
2017	Bangladesh U23	1	(0)
Medal record
Representing Bangladesh
SAFF U-17 Championship
Winner	2015 Bangladesh	Team
Bronze medal – third place	2013 Nepal	Team
SAFF U-20 Championship
Runner-up	2017 Bhutan	Team
- * Club domestic league appearances and goals as of 11 January 2025 ‡ National team caps and goals as of 6 November 2017

Mohamed Atikuzzaman (Bengali: মোহাম্মদ আতিকুজ্জামান; born 10 October 1999) is a Bangladeshi professional footballer who plays as a defender for Bangladesh Championship League club Dhaka Rangers FC. Mainly a right-back, he can also play as either a left-back or centre-back.

== Early career ==
In 2009, Atik gave medical examinations for the Sherpur District team for the JFA U-15 Cup, while attending a school cricket match at the Shahid Muktijoddha Smriti Stadium. Although he was originally interested in cricket, his focus shifted to football after being selected for his district team. In 2013, he trained in the BFF Sylhet Academy and also participated in the 2013 SAFF U-16 Championship. In 2014, he came to Dhaka and went onto win the BFF U-18 Football Tournament with Mohammedan SC U-18 while also receiving the tournaments Best Player Award. His performances saw coach Syed Golam Jilani recall him to the Bangladesh U16 team the following year. During the 2015–16 season, he led Dilkusha SC to win the Dhaka Third Division League.

== Club career ==
=== Victoria SC ===
In 2016, Atik joined second-tier club Victoria SC for the 2015–16 Bangladesh Championship League, after being involved with youth international football the previous few years. On 18 December 2016, he scored his first professional league goal by slotting in a penalty, in a 1–3 defeat to Saif Sporting Club.

=== Arambagh KS ===
In 2017, Atik joined Arambagh KS in the Bangladesh Premier League, a club which is known to focus on giving game time to local talents. On 5 August 2017, he made his top-tier debut during a 0–1 defeat to Saif Sporting Club. He remained ever-present during their 2017–18 Independence Cup triumph, which marked the club's first-ever domestic silverware in its history. His last appearance for the club came on 20 July 2019, coming on as a stoppage time substitute in a 6–3 victory over Rahmatganj MFS. He departed the club after the 2018–19 league season concluded, with 10 league appearances in two seasons.

=== Mohammedan SC ===
In 2019, Atik joined Mohammedan SC. He made his league debut against his former club Arambagh KS, on 14 February 2020. However, his first season at the club was hampered, as domestic football in the country was cancelled due to the COVID-19 pandemic. The following year, Atik played both in defence and in midfield, under coach Sean Lane. He scored two goals in the 2020–21 Federation Cup, one of which came in the quarter-finals against Saif Sporting Club. Mohammedan ended up losing the game 6–7 on penalties, as Atik missed their final spot kick.

On 24 August 2021, he scored his first top-tier league goal, as Mohammedan defeated Muktijoddha Sangsad KC 2–0. The same day, Atik was called up to the Bangladesh national team for a 2021 Three Nations Cup in Kyrgyzstan. His final year at the club saw him make 21 appearances in the league, his highest in a single season and following the leagues conclusion, Atik was the subject of numerous transfer rumors.

=== Sheikh Jamal Dhanmondi Club ===
In December 2019, it was reported that Atik had taken transfer money from both Mohammedan SC, Abahani Limited Dhaka and Sheikh Jamal Dhanmondi Club. Following the report, Mohammedan management filed a complaint to the Bangladesh Football Federation. Nonetheless, Atik joined Sheikh Jamal for the 2021–22 season, after he declared he would return the money he had taken from the other two clubs.

He appeared in the 2021 Independence Cup, against both Uttar Baridhara Club and Bashundhara Kings. Atik found limited game time in his lone year with the Dhanmondi based club, scoring his first goal, on 17 February 2021, in a league fixture against Rahmatganj MFS.

=== Bashundhara Kings ===
In 2022, Atik moved to Bashundhara Kings. However, after not making a single appearance for the team in any competition, he joined Muktijoddha Sangsad KC on loan during the second phase of the 2022–23 league season. On 4 April 2023, he made his debut Muktijoddha against his parent club Bashundhara Kings during the 2022–23 Federation Cup. On 8 April 2023, he scored for the club in his league debut, as they were dismantled 1–6 by Mohammedan SC.

== International career ==
In 2015, Atik was an integral part the Bangladesh U16 team which won the 2015 SAFF U-16 Championship. He scored group-stage goals against both Sri Lanka U16 and India U16. He also converted his penalty as Bangladesh won the final 4–2 on penalties against India U16.

In 2017, Atik played for the Bangladesh U23 team in the 2018 AFC U-23 Championship qualifiers, under coach Andrew Ord. In the same year, he was selected for the Bangladesh U19 team which participated in the 2018 AFC U-19 Championship qualifiers. On 6 November 2017, he scored a stoppage time own goal against Uzbekistan U19 in a 0–1 defeat. Nonetheless, his solid defensive performance during the game was praised by local media outlets.

On 9 September 2021, following their 2021 Three Nations Cup exit, coach Jamie Day played Atik in an unofficial friendly between the Bangladesh national team and Kyrgyzstan U23, which ended in a 2–3 defeat. In 2023, he made the final national squad for the initially delayed 2022 Asian Games in Hangzhou, China.

== Personal life ==
Atikuzzaman is the oldest among three brothers, and was brought up in Sherpur District of Bangladesh. In 2013, Atik's father Mohamed Badiuzzaman died of a stroke. However, due to Atik's mother, Hamida Begum, being the second wife, his family did not receive any financial support. His mother had to work as a cook in a hotel to support the family. According to Atik, his early life circumstances had given him even more desire to pursue a football career and achieve financial stability. In 2017, Atik was offered a job in the Bangladesh Air Force, however, he decided to focus on football and rejected the offer.

== Career statistics ==
=== Club ===
As of 8 April 2023.

Appearances and goals by club, season and competition
Club	Season	League			Domestic Cup (Note: Appearance(s) in Bangladesh Federation Cup)		Other (Note: Appearance(s) in Bangladesh Independence Cup)		Continental		Total	
Club	Season	Division	Apps	Goals	Apps	Goals	Apps	Goals	Apps	Goals	Apps	Goals
Victoria SC	2015–16	Bangladesh Championship League	11	1	—		—		—		11	1
Arambagh KS	2017–18	Bangladesh Premier League	7	0	0	0	5	0	—		12	0
Arambagh KS	2018–19	Bangladesh Premier League	3	0	1	0	0	0	—		4	0
Arambagh KS	Arambagh KS total		10	0	1	0	5	0	0	0	16	0
Mohammedan SC	2019–20	Bangladesh Premier League	2	0	4	0	—		—		6	0
Mohammedan SC	2020–21	Bangladesh Premier League	21	1	2	2	—		—		23	3
Mohammedan SC	Mohammedan SC total		23	1	6	2	0	0	0	0	29	3
Sheikh Jamal DC	2021–22	Bangladesh Premier League	8	1	1	0	2	0	—		11	1
Bashundhara Kings	2022–23	Bangladesh Premier League	0	0	0	0	0	0	0	0	0	0
Muktijoddha Sangsad (loan)	2022–23	Bangladesh Premier League	1	1	1	0	0	0	0	0	2	1
Sheikh Jamal DC	2023–24	Bangladesh Premier League	0	0	0	0	0	0	—		0	0
Career total			53	4	9	2	7	0	0	0	69	6

=== International goals ===
==== Youth ====
#	Date	Venue	Opponent	Score	Result	Competition
1.	11 August 2015	Sylhet District Stadium, Sylhet, Bangladesh	Sri Lanka	3–0	4–0	2015 SAFF U-16 Championship
2.	13 August 2015	Sylhet District Stadium, Sylhet, Bangladesh	India	2–1	2–1	2015 SAFF U-16 Championship

== Honours ==
Dilkusha SC

- Dhaka Third Division League: 2015

Arambagh KS

- Independence Cup: 2017–18

Bangladesh U16

- SAFF U-17 Championship: 2015

Individual

- 2014 − BFF U-18 Football Tournament Best Player Award.
