= 2020–21 Federation Cup (Bangladesh) =

32nd season of the Bangladesh Federation Cup

Walton Federation Cup 2020

Tournament details
- Host country: Bangladesh
- Dates: 22 December 2020 – 10 January 2021
- Teams: 13

Final positions
- Champions: Bashundhara Kings (2nd title)
- Runners-up: Saif Sporting Club

Tournament statistics
- Matches played: 22
- Goals scored: 64 (2.91 per match)
- Top scorer(s): 5 goals (Argentina) Raúl Becerra (Bashundhara Kings) (Nigeria) Kenneth Ikechukwu (Saif SC)
- Best player: (Nigeria) Kenneth Ikechukwu

The 2020–21 Federation Cup (due to sponsorship from Walton also known as Walton Federation Cup 2020) was the 32nd edition of the tournament, the main domestic annual club football competition in Bangladesh organized by Bangladesh Football Federation. The 13 participants is competing in the tournament. The tournament has started on 22 December 2020. The winner of the tournament will earn the slot of playing Qualifying play-off of 2022 AFC Cup.

Bashundhara Kings are current champions. The club have defeated Rahmatganj MFS by 2–1 on 5 January 2020 to lift the trophy for the first time.

== Venue ==
Dhaka
Bangabandhu National Stadium
Capacity: 36,000
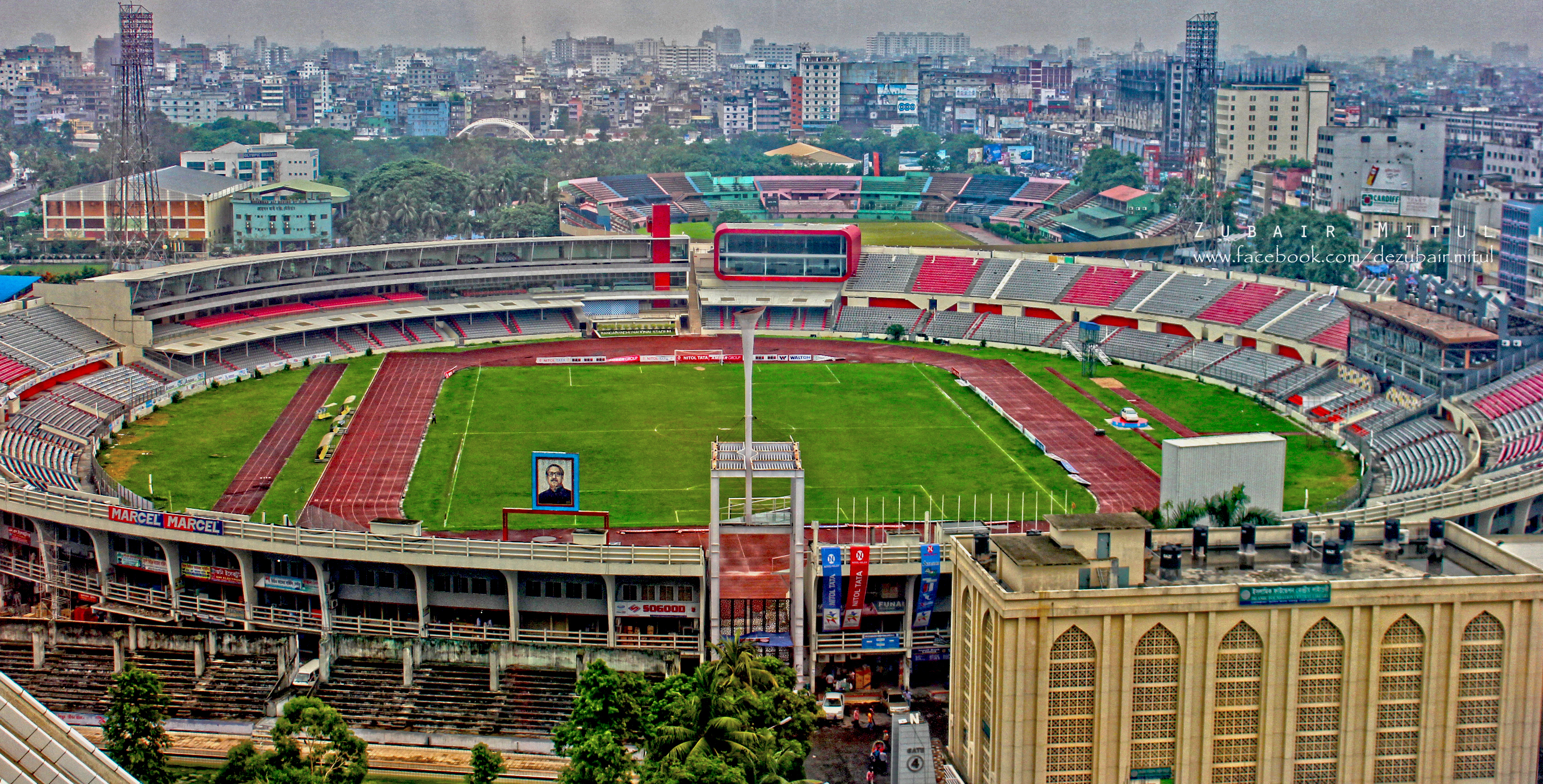

== Participating teams ==
The following teams contest in the tournament.

| Team | Appearances | Previous best performance |
|---|---|---|
| Arambagh KS | 32nd | Runners-up (1997, 2001, 2016) |
| Bangladesh Police FC | 2nd | Runners-up (1975) |
| Bashundhara Kings | 3rd | Champions (2019–20, 2020–21) |
| Brothers Union | 32nd | Champions (1980, 1991, 2005) |
| Chittagong Abahani | 32nd | Champions (2017) |
| Dhaka Abahani | 32nd | Champions (1982, 1985, 1986, 1988, 1997, 1999, 2000, 2010, 2016, 2017, 2018) |
| Mohammedan SC | 32nd | Champions (1980, 1981, 1982, 1983, 1987, 1989, 1995, 2002, 2008, 2009) |
| Muktijoddha Sangsad KC | 32nd | Champions (1994, 2001, 2003) |
| Rahmatganj MFS | 32nd | Runners-up (2019–20) |
| Sheikh Russel KC | 26th | Champions (2012) |
| Sheikh Jamal DC | 10th | Champions (2011-12, 2013, 2015) |
| Saif Sporting Club | 4th | Runners-up (2020–21) |
| Uttar Baridhara Club | 2nd | Quarter-finals (2020–21) |

== Draw ==
The draw ceremony of the tournament was held on 13 December 2020 at 12:00 BST on the 3rd floor of BFF House Motijheel, Dhaka. The thirteen teams were divided into four groups. The top two teams from each group will move into the Quarter-Finals.

== Group stage ==
- All matches will be held at Dhaka
- Time listed are UTC+6:00

Key to colour in group tables
| Group Winners and Runners-up advance to the Knockout stage |

=== Group A ===
| Pos | Team | Pld | W | D | L | GF | GA | GD | Pts | Qualification |
|---|---|---|---|---|---|---|---|---|---|---|
| 1 | Sheikh Russel KC | 2 | 2 | 0 | 0 | 4 | 2 | +2 | 6 | Advance to Knockout stage |
| 2 | Sheikh Jamal Dhanmondi Club | 2 | 0 | 1 | 1 | 4 | 5 | −1 | 1 | Advance to Knockout stage |
| 3 | Bangladesh Police FC | 2 | 0 | 1 | 1 | 2 | 3 | −1 | 1 | |

Source: Soccerway
24 December 2020
16:45 BST

| Sheikh Russel KC | 1–0 | Bangladesh Police FC |
|---|---|---|
| Asrorov 50' | Report |

Bangabandhu National Stadium, Dhaka
Referee: M. Z. F. Nahid (Bangladesh)

27 December 2020
17:45 BST

| Bangladesh Police FC | 2–2 | Sheikh Jamal Dhanmondi Club |
|---|---|---|
| Shadin 10'; Ariful 78' (o.g.) | Report | Jobe 51'; Solomon 79' |

Bangabandhu National Stadium, Dhaka
Referee: Md Jalal Uddin (Bangladesh)

30 December 2020
17:45 BST

| Sheikh Jamal Dhanmondi Club | 2–3 | Sheikh Russel KC |
|---|---|---|
| Solomon (49(pen.)) | Report | Asrorov 6'; Ugochukwu 39'; Toklis 59' |

Bangabandhu National Stadium, Dhaka
Referee: MD. Mizanur Rahman (Bangladesh)

=== Group B ===
| Pos | Team | Pld | W | D | L | GF | GA | GD | Pts | Qualification |
|---|---|---|---|---|---|---|---|---|---|---|
| 1 | Saif Sporting Club | 3 | 3 | 0 | 0 | 10 | 1 | +9 | 9 | Advance to Knockout stage |
| 2 | Uttar Baridhara Club | 3 | 2 | 0 | 1 | 6 | 5 | +1 | 6 | Advance to Knockout stage |
| 3 | Arambagh KS | 3 | 1 | 0 | 2 | 4 | 4 | 0 | 3 | |
| 4 | Brothers Union | 3 | 0 | 0 | 3 | 1 | 11 | −10 | 0 | |

Source: Soccerway
23 December 2020
15:15 BST

| Saif Sporting Club | 3–0 | Uttar Baridhara Club |
|---|---|---|
| Sayed 49' (o.g.); Ikechukwu 64'; Fahim 69' | Report |

Bangabandhu National Stadium, Dhaka
Referee: Bitu Raj Barua (Bangladesh)

23 December 2020
17:45 BST

| Arambagh KS | 2–0 | Brothers Union |
|---|---|---|
| Chizoba 44'; Murad 90' | Report |

Bangabandhu National Stadium, Dhaka
Referee: Jalal Uddin (Bangladesh)

26 December 2020
17:15 BST

| Uttar Baridhara Club | 3–2 | Arambagh KS |
|---|---|---|
| Sumon 24'; Sujon 30'; Kahraba 44' | Report | Chizoba 37'; Ucchash 75' |

Bangabandhu National Stadium, Dhaka
Referee: Anisur Rahman (Bangladesh)

26 December 2020
20:00 BST

| Saif Sporting Club | 6–1 | Brothers Union |
|---|---|---|
| Ikechukwu 20', 64'; Yeasin 36'; Arifur 49'; Maraz 77'; Sazzad 80' | Report | Siyo 90+3' (pen.) |

Bangabandhu National Stadium, Dhaka
Referee: M. Z. F. Nahid (Bangladesh)

29 December 2020
15:15 BST

| Brothers Union | 0–3 | Uttar Baridhara Club |
|---|---|---|
| | Report | Kochnev 14'; Sumon 27'; Sayed 61' |

Bangabandhu National Stadium, Dhaka
Referee: Bitu Raj Barua (Bangladesh)

29 December 2020
17:45 BST

| Saif Sporting Club | 1–0 | Arambagh KS |
|---|---|---|
| Arifur 56' | Report |

Bangabandhu National Stadium, Dhaka
Referee: Alomgir Sarker (Bangladesh)

=== Group C ===
| Pos | Team | Pld | W | D | L | GF | GA | GD | Pts | Qualification |
|---|---|---|---|---|---|---|---|---|---|---|
| 1 | Bashundhara Kings | 2 | 2 | 0 | 0 | 4 | 0 | +4 | 6 | Advance to Knockout stage |
| 2 | Chittagong Abahani | 2 | 1 | 0 | 1 | 1 | 1 | 0 | 3 | Advance to Knockout stage |
| 3 | Rahmatganj MFS | 2 | 0 | 0 | 2 | 0 | 4 | −4 | 0 | |

Source: Soccerway
22 December 2020
17:30 BST

| Bashundhara Kings | 3–0 | Rahmatganj MFS |
|---|---|---|
| Becerra 43'; Robinho 53'; Nasr 65' (o.g.) | Report |

Bangabandhu National Stadium, Dhaka
Referee: Sujit Banarjee (Bangladesh)

25 December 2020
18:00 BST

| Rahmatganj MFS | 0–1 | Chittagong Abahani |
|---|---|---|
| | Report | Nixon 36' |

Bangabandhu National Stadium, Dhaka
Referee: Bhovon Mohon Talukdar (Bangladesh)

28 December 2020
17:00 BST

| Chittagong Abahani | 0–1 | Bashundhara Kings |
|---|---|---|
| | Report | Becerra 49' |

Bangabandhu National Stadium, Dhaka
Referee: MD. Mizanur Rahman (Bangladesh)

=== Group D ===
| Pos | Team | Pld | W | D | L | GF | GA | GD | Pts | Qualification |
|---|---|---|---|---|---|---|---|---|---|---|
| 1 | Dhaka Abahani | 2 | 2 | 0 | 0 | 5 | 1 | +4 | 6 | Advance to Knockout stage |
| 2 | Mohammedan SC | 2 | 1 | 0 | 1 | 4 | 4 | 0 | 3 | Advance to Knockout stage |
| 3 | Muktijoddha Sangsad KC | 2 | 0 | 0 | 2 | 2 | 6 | −4 | 0 | |

Source: Soccerway
24 December 2020
19:15 BST

| Dhaka Abahani | 3–0 | Mohammedan SC |
|---|---|---|
| Masih 41'; Jewel 45', 53' | Report |

Bangabandhu National Stadium, Dhaka
Referee: Mizanur Rahman (Bangladesh)

27 December 2020
15:15 BST

| Mohammedan SC | 4–1 | Muktijoddha Sangsad KC |
|---|---|---|
| Shohag 42'; Atiquzzaman 75'; Nurat 80', 83' | Report | Kholdarov 68' |

Bangabandhu National Stadium, Dhaka
Referee: Jashim Akter (Bangladesh)

30 December 2020
15:15 BST

| Muktijoddha Sangsad KC | 1–2 | Dhaka Abahani |
|---|---|---|
| Rohit 87' | Report | Masih 30'; Belfort 69' |

Bangabandhu National Stadium, Dhaka
Referee: Jalal Uddin (Bangladesh)

== Knockout-stage ==
- All matches will play at Dhaka
- Times listed are UTC+6:00
- In the knockout stage, extra-time and a penalty shoot-out will used to decide the winner if necessary.

=== Bracket ===
Quarter finals
1 January 2021
Sheikh Russel KC | 0
Chittagong Abahani (a.e.t.) | 2
2 January 2021
Saif Sporting Club (p) | 2 (7)
Mohammedan SC | 2 (6)
3 January 2021
Bashundhara Kings | 2
Sheikh Jamal Dhanmondi Club | 0
4 January 2021
Dhaka Abahani | 1
Uttar Baridhara Club | 0

Semi finals
6 January 2021
Chittagong Abahani | 0
Saif Sporting Club | 3
7 January 2021
Bashundhara Kings (a.e.t.) | 3
Dhaka Abahani | 1

Final
10 January 2021
Saif Sporting Club | 0
Bashundhara Kings | 1

=== Quarter-finals ===
1 January 2021
16:00 BST

| Sheikh Russel KC | 0–2 (a.e.t.) | Chittagong Abahani |
|---|---|---|
| | Report | Rakib 107'; Mannaf 113' |

Bangabandhu National Stadium, Dhaka
Referee: Anisur Rahman (Bangladesh)

2 January 2021
16:00 BST

| Saif Sporting Club | 2–2 (a.e.t.) | Mohammedan SC |
|---|---|---|
| Ariwachukwu 7'; Ikechukwu 13' | Report | Atikuzzaman 1'; Diabate 44' |
Penalties
| Ikechukwu (penalty scored); Shahed (penalty scored); Okoli (penalty scored); Yeasin (penalty missed); Ariwachukwu (penalty scored); Rahim (penalty scored); Rahmat (penalty scored); Sirozhiddin (penalty scored) | 7–6 | (penalty scored) Diabate; (penalty missed) Sajib; (penalty scored) Nagata; (penalty scored) Sohag; (penalty scored) Mithu; (penalty scored) Coulidiati; (penalty scored) Bappy; (penalty missed) Atikuzzaman |

Bangabandhu National Stadium, Dhaka
Referee: S.M. Jashim Akter (Bangladesh)

3 January 2021
16:00 BST

| Bashundhara Kings | 2–0 | Sheikh Jamal Dhanmondi Club |
|---|---|---|
| Becerra 10'; Robinho 89' | Report |

Bangabandhu National Stadium, Dhaka
Referee: Raj Barua (Bangladesh)

4 January 2021
16:00 BST

| Dhaka Abahani | 1–0 | Uttar Baridhara Club |
|---|---|---|
| Wagsley 90+5' | Report |

Bangabandhu National Stadium, Dhaka
Referee: Alomgir Sarker (Bangladesh)

=== Semi-finals ===
6 January 2021
16:00 BST

| Chittagong Abahani | 0–3 | Saif Sporting Club |
|---|---|---|
| | Report | Ariwachukwu 8'; Ikechukwu 71'; Yeasin 90' |

Bangabandhu National Stadium, Dhaka
Referee: Jalal Uddin (Bangladesh)

7 January 2021
16:00 BST

| Bashundhara Kings | 3–1 (a.e.t.) | Dhaka Abahani |
|---|---|---|
| Fernandes 51', 120+1'; Becerra 111' | Report | Wagsley 31' |

Bangabandhu National Stadium, Dhaka
Referee: Sujit Banarjee (Bangladesh)

=== Final ===
The final was held at Home of football Bangabandhu National Stadium in Dhaka, on 10 January 2021 between Saif Sporting Club and Bashundhara Kings. Bashundhara won the match on 0–1 scoreline.

10 January 2021
16:00 BST

| Saif Sporting Club | 0–1 | Bashundhara Kings |
|---|---|---|
| | Report | Becerra 52' |

Bangabandhu National Stadium, Dhaka
Referee: Jalal Uddin (Bangladesh)

== Goalscorers ==
There have been 64 goals scored in 22 matches, for an average of 2.91 goals per match.

5 goals

- (Argentina) Raúl Becerra (Bashundhara Kings)
- (Nigeria) Kenneth Ikechukwu (Saif SC)

3 goals

- (The Gambia) Solomon King Kanform (Sheikh Jamal Dhanmondi Club)

2 goals

- (Afghanistan) Masih Saighani (Dhaka Abahani)
- (Bangladesh) Arifur Rahman (Saif SC)
- (Bangladesh) Jewel Rana (Dhaka Abahani)
- (Bangladesh) Mohamed Atikuzzaman (Mohammedan SC)
- (Bangladesh) Sumon Reza (Uttar Baridhara Club)
- (Bangladesh) Yeasin Arafat (Saif SC)
- (Brazil) Fernandes (Bashundhara Kings)
- (Brazil) Francisco Wagsley (Dhaka Abahani)
- (Brazil) Robinho (Bashundhara Kings)
- (Nigeria) Christopher Chizoba (Arambagh KS)
- (Nigeria) Emmanuel Ariwachukwu (Saif SC)
- (Nigeria) Mohammed Abiola Nurat (Mohammedan SC)
- (Tajikistan) Siyovush Asrorov (Sheikh Russel KC)

1 goal

- (Bangladesh) Foysal Ahmed Fahim (Saif SC)
- (Bangladesh) Habibur Rahman Sohag (Mohammedan SC)
- (Bangladesh) Mannaf Rabby (Chittagong Abahani)
- (Bangladesh) Maraz Hossain Opi (Saif SC)
- Mohammad Shadin (Bangladesh Police FC)
- (Bangladesh) Murad Hossain (Arambagh KS)
- (Bangladesh) Nihat Jaman Ucchash (Arambagh KS)
- (Bangladesh) Rakib Hossain (Chittagong Abahani)
- (Bangladesh) Rohit Sarkar (Muktijoddha Sangsad KC)
- (Bangladesh) Sazzad Hossain (Saif SC)
- (Bangladesh) Sujon Biswas (Uttar Baridhara Club)
- (Bangladesh) Toklis Ahmed (Sheikh Russel KC)
- (Brazil) Nixon Guylherme (Chittagong Abahani)
- (Democratic Republic of the Congo) Siyo Zunapio (Brothers Union)
- (Egypt) Mahmoud Sayed (Uttar Baridhara Club)
- (Egypt) Mostafa Kahraba (Uttar Baridhara Club)
- (The Gambia) Pa Omar Jobe (Sheikh Jamal Dhanmondi Club)
- (Haiti) Kervens Belfort (Dhaka Abahani)
- (Mali) Souleymane Diabate (Mohammedan SC)
- (Nigeria) Ugochukwu Obi Moneke (Sheikh Russel KC)
- (Uzbekistan) Akbarali Kholdarov (Muktijoddha Sangsad KC)
- (Uzbekistan) Evgeniy Kochnev (Uttar Baridhara Club)

=== Own goals ===
† Bold Club indicates winner of the match

| Player | Club | Opponent | Result | Date |
|---|---|---|---|---|
| (Egypt) Alaaeldin Nasr Elmagraby | Rahmatganj MFS | Bashundhara Kings | 0–3 | 22 December 2020 |
| (Egypt) Mahmoud Sayed | Uttar Baridhara Club | Saif SC | 0–3 | 23 December 2020 |
| (Bangladesh) Ariful Islam | Sheikh Jamal Dhanmondi Club | Bangladesh Police FC | 2–2 | 27 December 2020 |

== Broadcaster ==
- The private satellite TV channel T Sports has broadcast all matches live.
