= Habibur Rahman Sohag =

Bangladeshi footballer (born 1993)

Personal information
- Full name: Md Habibur Rahman Sohag
- Date of birth: 1 January 1993 (age 33)
- Place of birth: Narail, Bangladesh
- Height: 1.84 m (6 ft 0 in)
- Positions: Left back; center back; defensive midfielder

Senior career*
Years	Team	Apps	(Gls)
2009–2010	Dhaka Abahani	9	(1)
2010–2014	Mohammedan SC	48	(3)
2015–2016	Muktijoddha Sangsad	10	(1)
2017–2018	Arambagh KS	13	(0)
2018–2021	Mohammedan SC	40	(2)
2021–2022	Sheikh Russel KC	4	(0)

International career^{‡}
2007	Bangladesh U16	3	(1)
2009	Bangladesh U19	4	(0)
2011	Bangladesh U23	1	(0)
2021	Bangladesh	1	(0)
- * Club domestic league appearances and goals as of 4 April 2022 ‡ National team caps and goals as of 20 June 2021

Habibur Rahman Sohag (Bengali: হাবিবুর রহমান সোহাগ; born 1 January 1993) is a retired Bangladeshi professional footballer. He represented the Bangladesh national team in 2021. A versatile player, Sohag played in multiple roles, including central midfielder and attacking midfielder, towards the end of his career he played as a centre-back or defensive midfielder.

== Early career ==
Sohag was born in Naragathi village of Narail District. In 2003, he started practicing at the Narayanganj Osmani Stadium and was later picked up by teams in the district league. He also played in the JFA Cup U-14 tournament. In 2006, Sohag was selected by the BFF for advanced training at the Tata Academy Jamshedpur in India. In 2005, Sohag played 5 matches for the U13 national team at BKSP. The following year he was promoted to the U14 team and played 4 matches in Islamabad, Pakistan, where Bangladesh finished runners-up in a subcontinental tournament. He also gained experience from playing in the Pioneer League, before making his Bangladesh Premier League debut.

== Club career ==
In 2009, Sohag joined Abahani Limited Dhaka in the Bangladesh Premier League. He won the league title in his debut season and also made a few appearances in the 2010 AFC President's Cup, before moving to Mohammedan SC the subsequent year. During his three years with the Black and Whites he won the 2013 Super Cup.

In 2015, he moved to Muktijoddha Sangsad KC. On 4 August 2016, Sohag scored from a long-distance free-kick for Muktijoddha in their 2–0 victory over Brothers Union. His goal earned praise from both fans and local media. In 2017, he was brought to Arambagh KS by coach Maruful Haque. Sohag won the 2018 Independence Cup with Arambagh KS, and remained an integral part of the team over the course of the season.

He returned to Mohammedan SC, the following year, where British head coach Sean Lane, Sohag played as a center back. His performances with the club also earned him his first senior international cap in 2021. On 27 December 2023, Sohag's well-placed free kick against Muktijoddha earned Mohammedan a place in the quarter-finals of the 2020 Federation Cup. In 2022, Sohag joined Sheikh Russel KC, however, he was released from the club at the end of the season.

== International career ==
In 2007, Sohag played three matches and scored 1 goal at the 2008 AFC U-16 Championship qualifiers, held in Abu Dhabi, UAE. His goal came on 28 October 2007, in a 1–3 defeat to Tajikistan. In 2009, Sohag captained Bangladesh U19, at the 2010 AFC U-19 Championship qualifiers, held in Bangkok, Thailand.

In 2011, Croatian coach Robert Rubčić called up Sohag to the Bangladesh U23 for the 2012 Summer Olympics Qualifiers. He made his debut for the olympic team on 23 February, coming on as a substitute in the 89th minute against hosts Kuwait U23 in a 0–2 defeat.

Sohag was first called up for the Bangladesh national team at the 2021 Three Nations Cup. He made his debut on 27 March, coming on as a substitute against hosts Nepal in a 0–0 draw.

== Career statistics ==
=== International ===
As of 20 June 2021.

Bangladesh
Year	Apps	Goals
2021	1	0
Total	1	0

=== International goals ===
Youth

#	Date	Venue	Opponent	Score	Result	Competition
1.	28 October 2007	Al Waheda Stadium, Abu Dhabi	Tajikistan	1–3	1–3	2008 AFC U-16 Championship qualification

== Honours ==
Abahani Limited Dhaka

- Bangladesh Premier League: 2009–10
- Federation Cup: 2010
- Super Cup: 2010
- Bordoloi Trophy: 2010

Mohammedan SC

- Super Cup: 2013

Arambagh KS

- Independence Cup: 2017–18
