= Yeasin Arafat (footballer) =

Bangladeshi footballer

Personal information
- Full name: Yeasin Arafat
- Date of birth: 5 January 2003 (age 23)
- Place of birth: Narayanganj, Bangladesh
- Height: 1.70 m (5 ft 7 in)
- Position: Left back

Team information
- Current team: Brothers Union
- Number: 77

Youth career
- 2015–2016: Arambagh FA

Senior career*
Years	Team	Apps	(Gls)
2017–2018	Kadamtola Sangsad	9	(2)
2018–2021	Saif SC	52	(4)
2019	→ Chittagong Abahani (loan)	0	(0)
2021–2024	Bashundhara Kings	37	(2)
2024–2025	Dhaka Abahani	2	(0)
2025–	Brothers Union	0	(0)

International career^{‡}
2017–2018	Bangladesh U16	6	(1)
2018	Bangladesh U19	9	(3)
2019–	Bangladesh U23	8	(0)
2019–	Bangladesh	20	(1)
Medal record
Men's football
Representing Bangladesh
SAFF U-15 Championship
Bronze medal – third place	2017 Nepal	Team
SAFF U-18 Championship
Runner-up	2019 Nepal	Team
- * Club domestic league appearances and goals as of 21 May 2025 ‡ National team caps and goals as of 12 September 2023

Yeasin Arafat (Bengali: ইয়াসিন আরাফাত; born 5 January 2003) is a Bangladeshi professional footballer who plays as a left back for Bangladesh Football League club Brothers Union and the Bangladesh national team. He is known in his country for offensive playing style & skills.

== Club career ==
=== Arambagh Football Academy ===
Yeasin began his club career in 2015 with Arambagh Football Academy, under coach Syed Golam Jilani. In 2016, he helped the club secure the Pioneer Football League title, leading them to earn promotion to the country's fifth-tier, the Dhaka Third Division Football League.

=== Kadamtola Sangsad ===
In 2017, he started his senior club career with Kadamtola Sangsad in the Dhaka Third Division Football League. He captained the team during the Super League round and helped them earn promotion as league runners-up. He scored twice in the Super League round; against The Muslim Institute and Araf Sporting Club, respectively.

=== Saif Sporting Club ===
Yeasin started his journey in top tier from 2018 to 2019 season with Saif Sporting Club. On 19 January 2019, He made his Bangladesh Football League debut against Rahmatganj. The debutant registered an assist in this match, resulting in a 2–1 win. On 12 March 2020, he scored his first professional league goal in a 1–1 draw with Arambagh KS. In the debut season, He made 4 assists in 23 league appearances without conceding a single card. In 2019-20 league, he scored 2 goals with 1 assist in 6 appearances.

Yeasin played as a guest player for Chittagong Abahani Limited in the 2019 Sheikh Kamal International Club Cup. He played 5 matches and scored 1 goal against TC Sports Club, as the Chittagong-based club finished tournament runners-up.

In 2019, it was revealed that Saif SC tagged Yeasin Arafat with a release clause of 1 crore taka (0.12 million USD), making him the Bangladeshi player with the highest release clause. In September 2021, it was announced that Saif SC would not extend their contract with Yeasin.

=== Bashundhara Kings ===
On 25 November 2021, Yeasin joined Bashundhara Kings.

=== Abahani Limited Dhaka ===
On 31 May 2024, Yeasin confirmed his transfer to Abahani Limited Dhaka.

== International career ==
=== Youth teams ===
In 2013, he made his youth team debut when he played for the national U-12 team during the Mokh Cup in Malaysia. On 27 August 2017, Yeasin scored his first international goal during a 8–0 victory over Bhutan in the third-place match of the 2017 SAFF U-15 Championship. In the same year, he captained the Bangladesh U17 team during the 2018 AFC U-16 Championship qualifiers.

In 2019, Yeasin made his debut for Bangladesh U19. He was captain during the 2019 SAFF U-18 Championship. On 29 September 2019, he scored in the final of the tournament against India to equalise the score, however, he was shown a second yellow for taking his shirt off in celebration. Bangladesh eventually lost the match 1–2. Yeasin was heavily criticized by local media following the final, with former national team player, Mahabub Hossain Roksy stating "Our players lack football education because there is no system of academic education in football". Nonetheless, he was again given captaincy of the team for the 2020 AFC U-19 Championship qualifiers.

Yeasin was included in the Bangladesh U23 team for the 2019 South Asian Games and made his debut against Nepal U23. In 2021, he returned to the U23 team during the 2022 AFC U-23 Asian Cup qualification, held in Uzbekistan. In August 2023, Yeasin who had fallen out of favour with national team head coach Javier Cabrera, was named captain of the U23 team for the 2024 AFC U-23 Asian Cup qualification, held in Thailand.

=== Senior team ===
Yeasin made his debut for Bangladesh national team on 3 October 2019, against Bhutan in a FIFA friendly match. Bangladesh won the match by 2–0.

On 4 October 2021, Yeasin scored his first senior international goal in a 1–1 draw against India in the 2021 SAFF Championship. Yeasin was left out of the national camp for the 2023 SAFF Championship by coach Javier Cabrera, after failing to find sufficient game time at club level.

== Career statistics ==
=== Club ===
As of 2 July 2023.

Club	Season	League			Domestic Cup (Note: Appearance(s) in Bangladesh Federation Cup)		Other (Note: Appearance(s) in Bangladesh Independence Cup)		Continental		Total	
Club	Season	Division	Apps	Goals	Apps	Goals	Apps	Goals	Apps	Goals	Apps	Goals
Saif Sporting Club	2018–19	Bangladesh Football League	23	0	3	0	2	0	—		28	0
Saif Sporting Club	2019–20	Bangladesh FootballLeague	6	2	3	1	—		—		9	3
Saif Sporting Club	2020–21	Bangladesh Football League	23	3	6	2	—		—		29	5
Saif Sporting Club	Saif Sporting Club total		52	5	12	3	2	0	0	0	66	8
Bashundhara Kings	2021–22	Bangladesh Football League	18	1	0	0	6	1	3 (Note: Appearance(s) in AFC Cup)	0	27	2
Bashundhara Kings	2022–23	Bangladesh Premier League	15	1	6	0	6	0	—		27	1
Bashundhara Kings	2023–24	Bangladesh Football League	0	0	0	0	0	0	0	0	0	0
Career total			85	7	18	3	14	1	3	0	120	11

=== International ===
As of 27 September 2022.

National team	Year	Apps	Goals
Bangladesh	2019	1	0
Bangladesh	2020	0	0
Bangladesh	2021	11	1
Bangladesh	2022	8	0
Total		20	1

=== International goals ===
==== U-16 team ====
Scores and results list Bangladesh's goal tally first.

No	Date	Venue	Opponent	Score	Result	Competition
1.	27 August 2017	ANFA Complex, Nepal	Bhutan U15	7–0	8–0	2017 SAFF U-15 Championship

==== U-19 team ====
Scores and results list Bangladesh's goal tally first.

No	Date	Venue	Opponent	Score	Result	Competition
1.	29 September 2019	Halchowk Stadium, Nepal	India U18	1–1	1–2	2019 SAFF U-18 Championship
2.	8 November 2019	Khalifa Sports City Stadium, Qatar	Jordan U19	1–1	1–1	2020 AFC U-19 Championship qualification
3.	10 November 2019	Khalifa Sports City Stadium, Qatar	Bhutan U19	1–0	1–2	2020 AFC U-19 Championship qualification

==== Senior team ====
Scores and results list Bangladesh's goal tally first.

No.	Date	Venue	Opponent	Score	Result	Competition
1.	4 October 2021	National Football Stadium, Male	India	1–1	1–1	2021 SAFF Championship

== Honours ==
Arambagh FA

- Pioneer Football League: 2016

Saif Sporting Club

- Federation Cup runner-up: 2020–21

Bashundhara Kings

- Bangladesh Football League: 2021–22, 2022–23, 2023–24
- Independence Cup: 2022–23, 2023–24; runner-up: 2021-22
- Federation Cup third place: 2022–23
