= Emmanuel Ariwachukwu =

Nigerian footballer (born 1993)

Personal information
- Date of birth: 27 December 1993 (age 32)
- Place of birth: Owerri, Nigeria
- Height: 1.92 m (6 ft 4 in)
- Position: Centre-back

Senior career*
Years	Team	Apps	(Gls)
2007–2008	Gateway United		
2008–2010	Calabar Rovers		
2010–2012	Niger Tornadoes		
2012–2013	Sheikh Jamal Dhanmondi		
2013–2014	Akwa United		
2014–2015	Churchill Brothers		
2015–2018	Akwa United		
2018–2019	Al-Hilal Club		
2019–2020	Naft Maysan		
2020	Andijon	8	(0)
2020–2021	Saif SC	19	(2)

International career
2017	Nigeria	1	(0)
- * Club domestic league appearances and goals as of 13:49, 27 March 2023 (UTC)

Emmanuel Ariwachukwu // (born 27 December 1993) is a Nigerian professional footballer who last played for Saif SC in the Bangladesh Premier League, as a centre-back. He made one appearance for the Nigeria national team in 2017.

== Club career ==
Born in Owerri, he has played club football for Gateway United, Calabar Rovers, Niger Tornadoes, Sheikh Jamal Dhanmondi, Akwa United and Churchill Brothers. In October 2018, he moved to Al-Hilal Club, having previously been vice captain at Akwa United. In January 2019 he spoke about his positive start with Al Hilal. He moved to Naft Maysan later that year, and FK Andijon in 2020. He joined Saif SC on 11 November 2020 in Bangladesh Premier League.

== International career ==
He made his senior international debut for Nigeria on 19 August 2017 against Benin in a 2–0 win.
