= Raúl Becerra =

Chilean footballer (born 1987)

- Becerra with Deportes Iquique in 2018

Personal information
- Full name: Raúl Oscar Becerra
- Date of birth: 1 October 1987 (age 39)
- Place of birth: Río Gallegos, Argentina
- Height: 1.88 m (6 ft 2 in)
- Position: Forward

Senior career*
Years	Team	Apps	(Gls)
2006	Sportivo Santa Cruz	–	(–)
2007–2008	Juventud Alianza	11	(0)
2009	Boca Río Gallegos	21	(9)
2010	Huracán TA	12	(2)
2010–2011	Juventud de Pergamino	24	(11)
2011–2012	Almagro	39	(13)
2012–2013	Nueva Chicago	30	(9)
2013–2014	Argentinos Juniors	13	(0)
2014–2015	Colón	14	(1)
2016	Deportivo Cuenca	39	(19)
2017	Everton	24	(4)
2018	Deportes Iquique	25	(4)
2019–2020	Deportivo Cuenca	28	(18)
2020	Umm Salal	11	(5)
2021	Bashundhara Kings	17	(16)
2022–2024	Deportivo Cuenca	61	(14)
2025	GV San José	8	(1)
2025	Unión San Felipe	0	(0)
- * Club domestic league appearances and goals as of 18 July 2025

Raúl Oscar Becerra (born 1 October 1987) is an Argentine-Chilean professional footballer who plays as a forward.

== Club career ==
In February 2019, Becerra returned to Deportivo Cuenca with the conviction to improve the campaign carried out in 2016. That year he played 39 official Serie A matches of the national tournament and scored 19 goals: five in the first stage and 14 in the second.

On 31 October 2020, Bangladesh Premier League defending champions Bashundhara Kings confirmed that Becerra will be part of the team for 2020–21 season. On 22 December 2020, Becerra scored his first goal with Bashundhara Kings in the 2020–21 Bangladesh Federation Cup.

In February 2025, Becerra signed with Bolivian club GV San José from Deportivo Cuenca. In July of the same year, he switched to Chilean club Unión San Felipe. Few days later, the club ended the contract due to physical problems.

== Personal life ==
His mother is a Chilean who came to Argentina at the age of 14 and his father is Argentine. Due to his Chilean heritage, in 2017 he naturalized Chilean while playing for Everton de Viña del Mar.

== Honours ==
Boca Río Gallegos

- Liga Sur Santa Cruz (1): 2008–09

Bashundhara Kings

- Premier League (1): 2020–21
- Federation Cup (1): 2021–21
