= Robinho (footballer, born July 1995) =

Brazilian footballer (born 1995)

Personal information
- Full name: Robson Azevedo da Silva
- Date of birth: 21 July 1995 (age 31)
- Place of birth: São Caetano do Sul, Brazil
- Height: 1.80 m (5 ft 11 in)
- Position: Winger

Team information
- Current team: Bashundhara Kings

Youth career
- Mirassol

Senior career*
Years	Team	Apps	(Gls)
2016–2017	Atibaia	37	(10)
2016	→ Confiança (loan)	0	(0)
2017	→ Figueirense (loan)	18	(7)
2017–2021	Fluminense	22	(2)
2018	→ América Mineiro (loan)	12	(0)
2019	→ CSA (loan)	6	(1)
2019	→ Vila Nova (loan)	23	(1)
2020	→ Água Santa (loan)	9	(2)
2020–2021	→ Bashundhara Kings (loan)	23	(21)
2021–2024	Bashundhara Kings	53	(34)
2024–2025	Água Santa	6	(0)
2025–2026	Mohun Bagan	11	(3)
2026–	Bashundhara Kings		
- * Club domestic league appearances and goals as of 6 October 2026

Robson Azevedo da Silva (born 21 July 1995 in São Caetano do Sul), commonly known as Robinho, is a Brazilian professional footballer who plays as a winger.

== Club career ==
=== Early career ===
Born in São Caetano do Sul, São Paulo, Robinho is a Mirassol youth graduate who made his senior debut with Atibaia in 2016. Later that year, he was loaned to Série C side Confiança but did not play in the club's matches.

After scoring seven goals for Atibaia in the 2017 Campeonato Paulista Série A3, Robinho was loaned to Figueirense in the Série B. He immediately became a starter for his new side, scoring seven times in only 18 appearances.

=== Fluminense ===
On 13 August 2017, Fluminense announced the signing of Robinho from Atibaia on a four-year contract, for a rumoured fee of € 2 million (R$ 7.4 million) for 50% of the economic rights. He made his Série A debut on 10 September, replacing Douglas Augusto in a 2–2 away draw against Vitória.

==== Loans to América Mineiro, CSA and Vila Nova ====
After failing to establish himself at Flu, Robinho was loaned to América Mineiro in 2018. After only 12 goalless matches, he joined CSA on loan until the end of the year on 25 February 2019.

After just nine matches at CSA, Robinho's loan was cut short, and he moved to Vila Nova on a temporary deal.

=== Bashundhara Kings ===
On 5 August 2020, Robinho moved abroad for the first time in his career and joined Bangladeshi club Bashundhara Kings on a season-long loan. On 22 December, he scored his first goal with the Kings in the 2020–21 Bangladesh Federation Cup. Robinho scored 24 goals for the Kings during his loan period, lifting a domestic double with the club and being the league's top goalscorer with 21 goals.

Following the season, his contract with Fluminense expired, and he signed a permanent deal with Bashundhara.

Robinho scored the first-ever goal at the new Bashundhara Kings Arena on 17 February 2022, during a 3–0 win against Bangladesh Police.

=== Mohun Bagan ===
On 30 August 2025, Robinho joined Mohun Bagan from Brazilian club Água Santa ahead of the 2025–26 Indian Super League season. He won the IFA Shield in his first season, scoring in Mohun Bagan's victory over East Bengal in the final.

=== Return to Bashundhara Kings ===
In August 2026, he returned to Bashundhara Kings after agreeing to a contract with the club.

== Career statistics ==
=== Club ===
As of 10 November 2021

Club	Season	League			State League		Cup		Continental		Other		Total	
Club	Season	Division	Apps	Goals	Apps	Goals	Apps	Goals	Apps	Goals	Apps	Goals	Apps	Goals
Atibaia	2016	Paulista A3	—		20	3	—		—		—		20	3
Atibaia	2017	Paulista A3	—		17	7	—		—		—		17	7
Atibaia	Subtotal		—		37	10	—		—		—		37	10
Confiança (loan)	2016	Série C	0	0	—		—		—		—		0	0
Figueirense (loan)	2017	Série B	18	7	—		—		—		—		18	7
Fluminense	2017	Série A	5	1	—		—		3 (Note: All appearance(s) in Copa Sudamericana)	0	—		8	1
Fluminense	2018	Série A	6	0	11	1	3	1	1	0	—		21	2
Fluminense	2019	Série A	0	0	0	0	0	0	0	0	—		0	0
Fluminense	Subtotal		11	1	11	1	3	1	4	0	—		29	3
América Mineiro (loan)	2018	Série A	12	0	—		—		—		—		12	0
CSA (loan)	2019	Série A	3	0	3	1	0	0	—		3 (Note: Appearance(s) in Copa do Nordeste)	1	9	2
Vila Nova (loan)	2019	Série B	23	1	—		—		—		—		23	1
Água Santa (loan)	2020	Paulista	—		9	2	—		—		—		9	2
Bashundhara Kings	2020–21	Bangladesh Premier League	23	21	—		5	2	3 (Note: Appearance(s) in AFC Cup)	1	—		31	24
Bashundhara Kings	2021–22	Bangladesh Premier League	20	16	—				3	1	—			
Bashundhara Kings	2022–23	Bangladesh Premier League	18	10	—		4	3			—			
Bashundhara Kings	2023–24	Bangladesh Premier League	15	8	—				6	2	—			
Bashundhara Kings	Subtotal		76	55			9	5	12	4			97	64
Água Santa	2025	Paulista	0	0	0	0	0	0	—		—		0	0
Career total			90	30	60	14	8	3	7	1	3	1	168	49

== Honours ==
CSA

- Campeonato Alagoano: 2019

Bashundhara Kings

- Bangladesh Premier League: 2020–21, 2021–22, 2022–23, 2023–24
- Bangladesh Federation Cup: 2020–21
- Bangladesh Independence Cup: 2022–23, 2023–24

Mohun Bagan

- IFA Shield: 2025
