= Fernandes (footballer, born 1995) =

Brazilian footballer

Personal information
- Full name: Jonathan da Silveira Fernandes Reis
- Date of birth: 21 February 1995 (age 31)
- Place of birth: Rio de Janeiro, Brazil
- Height: 1.75 m (5 ft 9 in)
- Position: Midfielder

Team information
- Current team: Rajasthan United
- Number: 29

Youth career
- 2005–2015: Botafogo

Senior career*
Years	Team	Apps	(Gls)
2015–2020	Botafogo	76	(10)
2018	→ Atlético Goianiense (loan)	33	(1)
2019	→ Guarani (loan)	7	(0)
2019	→ São Bento (loan)	15	(0)
2020–2022	Bashundhara Kings	22	(7)
2023	RJ Portuguesa	18	(1)
2023–2024	Abahani Limited	13	(6)
2024–2025	Bashundhara Kings	14	(5)
2026–	Rajasthan United	2	(0)
- * Club domestic league appearances and goals as of 20:33, 17 March 2026 (UTC)

Jonathan da Silveira Fernandes Reis (born 21 February 1995), simply known as Fernandes, is a Brazilian professional footballer who plays as a midfielder for Indian Football League club Rajasthan United.

== Club career ==
Born in Rio de Janeiro, Fernandes joined Botafogo's youth setup in 2005, aged ten. On 4 January 2015, he was promoted to the first team in Série B.

Fernandes made his senior debut on 31 January 2015, coming on as a second half substitute for Gegê in a 1–0 Campeonato Carioca home win against Boavista. His first goal in the competition came on 7 February, the last of a 4–0 home routing of Bonsucesso.

Fernandes contributed with two goals in 17 appearances during the year's Série B, as his side achieved promotion as champions, and renewed his contract until 2018 on 30 November 2015. He made his Série A debut on 15 May 2016, starting in a 0–1 home loss against São Paulo.

Fernandes scored his first goal in the top tier on 22 May 2016, netting the equalizer in a 1–1 draw at Sport.

On 21 August 2020, Fernandes signs with Bashundhara Kings in Bangladesh Premier League. On 22 December 2020, Fernandes debuted for Bashundhara Kings in 2020–21 Bangladesh Federation Cup. He also represented the club at the 2021 AFC Cup.

== Career statistics ==
=== Club ===
As of 20 September 2021

Club	Season	League				Cup			Continental			Total		
Club	Season	Division	Apps	Goals	Assists	Apps	Goals	Assists	Apps	Goals	Assists	Apps	Goals	Assists
Bashundhara Kings	2020–21	Bangladesh Premier League	22	7	15	5	2	2	3	1	0	30	10	17

== Honours ==
Botafogo

- Campeonato Brasileiro Série B: 2015

Bashundhara Kings

- Bangladesh Premier League: 2020–21
- Bangladesh Federation Cup: 2020–21
