= Souleymane Diabate =

Malian footballer

Personal information
- Date of birth: 23 March 1991 (age 35)
- Place of birth: Mali
- Height: 1.83 m (6 ft 0 in)
- Position: Center forward

Team information
- Current team: Dhaka Abahani
- Number: 10

Senior career*
Years	Team	Apps	(Gls)
2010–2014	Can Tho		(34)
2015–2016	Long An	24	(14)
2017–2018	AS Olympique de Messira		
2018–2025	Dhaka Mohammedan	112	(96)
2025–	Dhaka Abahani	17	(11)

International career^{‡}
2009	Mali U20	2	(0)
- * Club domestic league appearances and goals as of 24 May 2026 ‡ National team caps and goals as of 24 May 2026

Souleyman Diabate (born 23 March 1991) is a Malian professional footballer who plays as a striker for Bangladesh Premier League club Dhaka Abahani.

== Club career ==
He played for Can Tho FC from 2010 to 2014 and Long An FC until 2016. He returned to Mali to play for AS Olympique de Messira in 2017–18. In May 2019, he signed for Mohammedan SC in the Bangladesh Premier League.

== Personal life ==
In April 2023, Diabate expressed interest to represent Bangladesh in international level after gaining Bangladeshi citizenship.

== Honours ==
Mohammedan SC

- Bangladesh Premier League: 2024–25
- Federation Cup: 2022–23
