= 2026–27 Fortis FC season =

Fortis FC 2026–27 football season

Fortis FC
2026–27 season
- Owner: Fortis Group
- President: Md Shahin Hasan
- Head coach: Masud Parvez Kaisar
- Stadium: Bashundhara Kings Arena
- Bangladesh Football League: TBD
- Federation Cup: TBD
- AFC Challenge League: Group stage
- Top goalscorer: League: All: Mohammad Ibrahim (1 goal)
- All statistics correct as of 11 August 2026.

The 2026–27 season is the Fortis FC's 8th season since its establishment in 2020 and their 6th season in the Bangladesh Football League. In addition to domestic league, Fortis FC are participating on this season's edition of Federation Cup and AFC Challenge League. The season covers period from 1 June 2026 to May 2027.

== First-team squad ==
As of 12 October 2026

No.	Player	Position	Nationality	Date of birth (age)	Signed from	Date signed	Fee	Contract end
Goalkeepers
1	Sujan Perera	GK	Sri Lanka	18 July 1992 (age 34)	T.C. Sports Club	9 July 2025	Free transfer	
25	Md Mehedi Islam Rabbani	GK	Bangladesh	12 February 2007 (age 19)	Uttar Baridhara	25 July 2025	Free transfer	
30	Md Atick Hossain Sourav	GK	Bangladesh			2025		
—	Saiful Islam	GK	Bangladesh			1 August 2026	Free transfer	
Defenders
2	Md Rasel Hossain	DF	Bangladesh			1 July 2025	Transfer	
5	Monjurur Rahman Manik	CB	Bangladesh		Dhanmondi	2024		
12	Sani Das	DF	Bangladesh		BFF Elite FA	2025		
15	Md Emon Babu Jibon	DM	Bangladesh		Little Friends Club	2025		
23	Monir Alam	LB	Bangladesh	24 March 2000 (age 26)	Brothers Union	12 July 2026	Free transfer	
24	Sheikh Sangram	DF	Bangladesh					
33	Shakil Hossain	DF	Bangladesh	6 July 2002 (age 24)	Dhaka Abahani	1 August 2026	Free transfer	
44	Ananta Tamang	CB	Nepal		Tribhuvan Army	14 August 2025	Free transfer	
73	Shian Kawasaki	DF	Japan		Mazda GB	18 July 2026	Free transfer	
3	Mithu Chowdhury	DF	Bangladesh		Brothers Union	10 August 2025	Free transfer	
Midfielders
4	Essa Jallow	MF	The Gambia	14 August 2000 (age 26)		19 August 2024		
6	Shanto Tudu	MF	Bangladesh	15 October 2001 (age 25)	Fakirerpool YMC	1 July 2026	Free transfer	
8	Arik Bista	MF	Nepal		Church Boys United	27 July 2026	Transfer	
13	Atiqur Rahman Fahad	MF	Bangladesh	15 September 1995 (age 31)	Dhanmondi	19 August 2024	Free transfer	
14	Md Sharif	MF	Bangladesh			15 July 2026	Transfer	
17	Md Shafiq Rahman Tihim	MF	Bangladesh		Little Friends Club	2025		
19	Mohammad Ibrahim	MF	Bangladesh	7 August 1997 (age 29)	Dhaka Abahani	10 August 2026	Free transfer	
21	Riaj Uddin	MF	Bangladesh		Chittagong Abahani	2024		
21	Insan Hossen	MF	Bangladesh					
73	Noriki Akada	MF	Japan	4 October 1999 (age 27)	Persipura Jayapura	28 August 2026	Free transfer	
80	Yusei Shimomura	MF	Japan			1 August 2026	Free transfer	
—	Rejuan Ali	MF	Bangladesh					
—	Mohammad Sofiq	MF	Bangladesh					
Forwards
3	Mithun Chowdhury	FW	Bangladesh					
7	Murshed Ali	FW	Bangladesh		BFF Elite FA	2025		
9	Stephen Chukwude	FW	Nigeria	21 October 1994 (age 32)	Bendel Insurance	30 July 2026	Free transfer	
10	Pa Omar Babou (C)	FW	The Gambia		SCC Mohammédia	2023		
11	Shakhawat Hossain Rony	FW	Bangladesh	8 October 1991 (age 35)	Chittagong Abahani	2022		
20	Rafayel Tudu	FW	Bangladesh			10 July 2026	Free transfer	
26	Ariful Islam Shanto	FW	Bangladesh	14 February 1997 (age 29)	Brothers Union	2025		
35	Md Abu Sayed	FW	Bangladesh					
38	Shuki Itofusa	FW	Bangladesh	31 March 2004 (age 22)	Savannakhet Zelos	25 August 2026		

== Preseason friendlies ==
29 July 2026 Friendly Match	Fortis FC	1–1	Bangladesh Police FC	Dhaka
14:00 BST (UTC+6)	P. Babou 80' (pen.)			Stadium: Fortis FC Practice Ground

24 August 2026 Friendly Match	Fortis FC	2–2	Bangladesh U-20	Dhaka
15:00 BST (UTC+6)	S. Rony		Ehosan Riduan; Siam Omit	Stadium: Fortis FC Practice Ground

11 September 2026 Friendly Match	Fortis FC	1–0	Bangladesh	Dhaka
16:00 BST (UTC+6)	Stephen Chukwude ?	Report		Stadium: Bashundhara Kings Arena

== Transfers and contracts ==
=== Transfers in ===
Date	Pos.	No.	Player	From	Fee	Ref.
1 July 2026	—	—	Shanto Tudu	Fakirerpool YMC	Free transfer	
1 July 2026	—	—	Md Himel	Little Friends Club	Free transfer	
4 July 2026	—	—	Insan Hossain	Bashundhara Kings	Free transfer	
10 July 2026	—	—	Rafayel Tudu	Mohammedan	Free transfer	
15 July 2026	—	—	Monir Alam	Brothers Union	Free transfer	
17 July 2026	—	—	Shian Kawasaki	Mazda GB	Free transfer	
27 July 2026	—	—	Arik Bista	Church Boys United	Free transfer	
30 July 2026	—	—	Stephen Chukwude	Bendel Insurance	Free transfer	
21 August 2026	—	—	Shuki Itofusa	Savannakhet Zelos	Free transfer	
29 August 2026	—	73	Noriki Akada	Persipura Jayapura	Free transfer	
—	—	—	Shakil Hossain	Dhaka Abahani	Free transfer	
—	—	—	Yusei Shimomura	Ezra	Free transfer	
—	—	—	Abu Sayed	PWD	Free transfer	
—	—	—	Golam Rabby	Chittagong Abahani	Free transfer	
—	—	—	Sheikh Sangram	Khelaghar	Free transfer	
—	—	—	Md Sharif	PWD	—	
—	—	—	Saad Bin Alam	Chattogram City	End of loan	
—	—	—	Mohammad Ibrahim	Dhaka Abahani	Free transfer	

=== Transfers out ===
Date	Pos.	No.	Player	To	Fee	Ref.
13 July 2026	—	—	Md Forhad Mona	City Club	Free transfer	
21 July 2026	—	—	Onyekachi Okafor	City Club	Free transfer	
23 July 2026	—	—	Noyon Mia	City Club	Free transfer	
—	—	—	Abdullah Omar Sajib	Dhaka Abahani	Free transfer	
—	—	—	Sazzad Hossen	Rahmatganj MFS	Free transfer	
—	—	—	Piash Ahmed Nova	City Club	Free transfer	
—	—	—	Borhan Uddin	Chattogram City	Free transfer	
—	—	—	Kamacai Marma Aky	City Club	Free transfer	
—	—	—	Golam Rabby	Brothers Union	Free transfer	
—	—	—	Mominur Fokir	Arambagh	Free transfer	
—	—	—	Sajed Hasan Jummon	City Club	—	
—	—	—	Sakib Bepary	Rahmatganj MFS	—	
—	—	—	Shree Joy Kumar	Arambagh	—	
—	—	—	Saad Bin Alam	Arambagh	—	
—	—	—	Mamunul Islam	Retired	—	
—	—	—	Mohammad Nayeem Mia	Without club	—	
—	—	—	Omar Linkcon	Without club	—	

=== Loaned in ===
Date	Pos.	No.	Player	Loaned from	Loaned until	Ref.
2026	—	—	Mohammad Ibrahim	Dhaka Abahani	End of loan period	

=== Loaned out ===
Date	Pos.	No.	Player	Loaned to	Loaned until	Ref.

== Overall ==
Win Draw Loss Fixtures

Competition	First match	Last match	Final Position
BFL	18 September 2026	April 2027	
Federation Cup	October 2026	April 2027	
AFC Challenge League	11 August 2026	TBD 2026	

=== Overview ===
Competition	Record							
Competition	Pld	W	D	L	GF	GA	GD	Win %
BFL	4	3	1	0	15	3	+12	75.00
Federation Cup	1	0	1	0	1	1	+0	0.00
AFC Challenge League	4	2	0	2	5	6	−1	50.00
Total	9	5	2	2	21	10	+11	55.56

Last updated: 18 September 2026
Source: Competitions

=== Premier League ===
==== League table ====
Pos	Team	Pld	W	D	L	GF	GA	GD	Pts
3	Bashundhara Kings	4	3	1	0	15	3	+12	10
4	City Club	5	3	1	1	12	7	+5	10
5	Fortis	3	2	1	0	15	3	+12	7
6	Dhaka Abahani	4	2	1	1	9	4	+5	7
7	Rahmatganj	5	1	3	1	8	8	0	6

Updated to match(es) played on 24 October 2026. Source: Soccerway
Rules for classification: 1) Points; 2) Goal difference; 3) Number of goals scored.

==== Results summary ====
Overall								Home						Away					
Pld	W	D	L	GF	GA	GD	Pts	W	D	L	GF	GA	GD	W	D	L	GF	GA	GD
3	2	1	0	15	3	+12	7	1	1	0	9	3	+6	1	0	0	6	0	+6

Last updated: 18 September 2026.
Source: Soccerway

==== Results by round ====
Round	1	2	3	4	5	6	7	8	9	10	11	12	13	14	15	16	17	18
Ground	H	H	A															
Result	W	D	W															
Position	1	2	2															

Updated to match(es) played on 18 September 2026. Source: Matches
A = Away; H = Home; W = Win; D = Draw; L = Loss; P = Postponed

==== Matches ====
18 September 2026 1	Fortis FC	6–0	Chattogram City FC	Dhaka
BST 15:00	P. Babou 47', 88'; Noriki Akada 55', 77'; M. Ibrahim 79'; R. Tudu 82'	Report	M. Mithu (yellow card) 45+3'; M. Kahraba (yellow card) 45+4'	Stadium: Bashundhara Kings Arena; Referee: Md Symoon Hasan Sany

3 October 2026 2	Fortis FC	3-3	City Club	Dhaka
BST 15:00	P. Babou 49'; Noriki Akada 69'; M. Ibrahim 38'	Report		Stadium: Bashundhara Kings Arena

9 October 2026 3	Brothers Union	0-6	Fortis FC	Gopalganj
BST 14:45				Stadium: Gopalganj Old Stadium

27 November 2026 4	Bashundhara Kings	v	Fortis FC	Dhaka
BST 17:30				Stadium: Bashundhara Kings Arena

5 December 2026 5	Fortis FC	v	Dhaka Wanderers	Dhaka
BST 14:30				Stadium: Bashundhara Kings Arena

12 December 2026 6	Arambagh KS	v	Fortis FC	Gopalganj
BST 14:30				Stadium: Gopalganj Old Stadium

18 December 2026 7	Fortis FC	v	PWD Sports Club	Dhaka
BST 14:30				Stadium: Bashundhara Kings Arena

26 December 2026 8	Rahmatganj MFS	v	Fortis FC	Munshiganj
BST 14:30				Stadium: Munshiganj Stadium

2 January 2027 9	Abahani Limited	v	Fortis FC	Comilla
BST 14:30				Stadium: Comilla Stadium

9 January 2027 10	Fortis FC	v	Mohammedan SC	Dhaka
BST 14:30				Stadium: Bashundhara Kings Arena

15 January 2027 11	Fortis FC	v	Bangladesh Police FC	Dhaka
BST 14:30				Stadium: Bashundhara Kings Arena

22 January 2027 12	Fortis FC	v	Fakirerpool YMC	Dhaka
BST 14:30				Stadium: Bashundhara Kings Arena

=== Group A ===
Pos	Team	Pld	W	D	L	GF	GA	GD	Pts	Qualification
1	Brothers Union	2	1	1	0	4	1	+3	4	Qualified for QRF 1
2	Chattogram City	2	1	1	0	4	2	+2	4	Advanced to QRF 2
3	Dhaka Abahani	1	0	1	0	1	1	0	1	
4	Fortis FC	1	0	1	0	1	1	0	1	
5	Rahmatganj	2	0	1	1	1	3	−2	1	
6	Fakirerpool	2	0	1	1	2	5	−3	1	

Updated to match(es) played on 13 October 2026. Source: Soccerway

=== AFC Challenge League ===
==== Preliminary stage ====
11 August 2026 AFC CL PS	Fortis (Bangladesh)	1–0	(Kyrgyzstan) Muras United	Dhaka
15:00 BST (UTC+6)	Ibrahim 52'	AFC Report; GSA Report		Stadium: Bashundhara Kings Arena; Attendance: 2,113; Referee: Husain Al Showaikh (Bahrain)

==== Group stage ====
Group C

Pos	Team	Pld	W	D	L	GF	GA	GD	Pts	Qualification	QAD	FOR	GOA	REG
1	(Kuwait) Al-Qadsia (H)	3	3	0	0	6	1	+5	9	Quarter-finals		3–0	2–1	1–0
2	(Bangladesh) Fortis	3	1	0	2	4	6	−2	3 (Note: Head-to-head goals scored: Fortis 1, Goa 0, Regar-TadAZ –1.)				1–2	3–1
3	(India) Goa	3	1	0	2	4	5	−1	3					1–2
4	(Tajikistan) Regar-TadAZ	3	1	0	2	3	5	−2	3					

Source: AFC
Rules for classification: Group stage tiebreakers
(H) Hosts
Notes:

17 October 2026 Group stage	Al-Qadsia (Kuwait)	0–3	(Bangladesh) Fortis	Hawally, Kuwait
23:30 BST (UTC+6)		AFC Report; GSA Report	Khabba 20'; Lakhdar 71'; Abdalla 90'	Stadium: Mohammed Al-Hamad Stadium; Attendance: 1,096; Referee: Izzul Fikri (Malaysia)

20 October 2026 Group stage	(Bangladesh) Fortis	1–2	(India) Goa	Hawally, Kuwait
19:25 BST (UTC+6)	Tudu 78'	AFC Report; GSA Report	Ortiz 6'; Chiki 85'	Stadium: Mohammed Al-Hamad Stadium; Attendance: 120; Referee: Mohamed Javiz (Maldives)

23 October 2026 Group stage	(Bangladesh) Fortis	3–1	(Tajikistan) Regar-TadAZ	Hawally, Kuwait
19:25 BST (UTC+6)	Tudu 67'; Kawasaki 71'; Itofusa 88'	AFC Report; GSA Report	Makhamadiev 12'	Stadium: Mohammed Al-Hamad Stadium; Attendance: 156; Referee: Sashanka Madushanka (Sri Lanka)

== Statistics ==
=== Goalscorers ===
As of 18 September 2026

Rank	Player	Position	Total	BPL	Federation	Challenge League
1	(The Gambia) Pa Omar Babou	FW	5	5	0	0
2	(Bangladesh) Rafayel Tudu	FW	1	1	0	0
	(Bangladesh) Mohammad Ibrahim	MF	2	1	0	1
	(Japan) Noriki Akada	MF	2	2	0	0
Total			7	6	0	1
