= 2026–27 in Bangladeshi football =

2026–26l7 Bangladeshi football season

Football in Bangladesh
- Season: 2026–27

Men's football
- BFL: TBD
- 2nd Division: TBD
- 3rd Division: TBD
- Federation Cup: TBD

Women's football
- BWFL: TBD

The 2026–27 season is the 55th competitive association football season in Bangladesh. The domestic season was begun on 10 July 2026, while the national team season commences on 4 June 2026 to 30 June 2027.

The following is a list of match results in the 2026–27 season, as well as any future matches that have been scheduled in the season.

Legend

Win Draw Loss Void or postponed Fixtures

== Men's national teams ==
=== Friendlies game ===
2026

| 5 June 2026 Friendly | San Marino | 1–2 | Bangladesh | Serravalle, San Marino |
| 19:00 CEST (23:00 BST) | Giacopetti 31' | GSA; UEFA | Barman 19', 86' | Stadium: San Marino Stadium; Attendance: 2,934; Referee: Walter Altmann (Austria) |

| 11 September 2026 Hybrid friendly | Bangladesh | 0–1 | (Bangladesh) Fortis | Dhaka, Bangladesh |
| 18:00 UTC+6 | | | Sagor | Stadium: National Stadium |

=== 2026 FIFA ASEAN Cup ===
==== Group A ====
| Pos | Team | Pld | W | D | L | GF | GA | GD | Pts | Qualification |
|---|---|---|---|---|---|---|---|---|---|---|
| 1 | Indonesia (H) | 3 | 2 | 1 | 0 | 11 | 2 | +9 | 7 (Note: Tied on head-to-head result (Malaysia 0–0 Indonesia) and total goal difference (+9), ranked on total goals scored.) | Advance to final |
| 2 | Malaysia | 3 | 2 | 1 | 0 | 9 | 0 | +9 | 7 | Advance to bronze final |
| 3 | Singapore | 3 | 1 | 0 | 2 | 1 | 8 | −7 | 3 | |
| 4 | Bangladesh | 3 | 0 | 0 | 3 | 2 | 13 | −11 | 0 | |

Source: FIFA
(H) Hosts
Notes:

| 25 September 2026 2026 FIFA ASEAN Cup; Premier Division Group A | Bangladesh | 0–3 | Malaysia | Jakarta, Indonesia |
| 14:00 (BST) | | Report | Arif 18', 37'; Bérgson 52' | Stadium: Gelora Bung Karno Stadium; Referee: Resul Mammedov (Turkmenistan) |

| 28 September 2026 2026 FIFA ASEAN Cup; Premier Division Group A | Singapore | 1–0 | Bangladesh | Jakarta, Indonesia |
| 14:00 (BST) | H. Stewart 35' | Report | | Stadium: Gelora Bung Karno Stadium; Referee: Mongkolchai Pechsri (Thailand) |

| 1 October 2026 2026 FIFA ASEAN Cup; Premier Division Group A | Indonesia | 9–2 | Bangladesh | Jakarta, Indonesia |
| 16:30 (BST) | Baker 11', 20', 37', 42', 90+7'; Ridho 32'; Hubner 45+1'; Vickery 90'; Diks 90+6' | Report | Emon 36'; Wahid 90+1' | Stadium: Gelora Bung Karno Stadium; Referee: Nasrullo Kabirov (Tajikistan) |

=== 2026 SAFF Championship ===
==== Group A ====
| Pos | Team | Pld | W | D | L | GF | GA | GD | Pts | Qualification |
|---|---|---|---|---|---|---|---|---|---|---|
| 1 | Bangladesh (H) | 2 | 2 | 0 | 0 | 5 | 0 | +5 | 6 | Advanced to the Knockout stage |
| 2 | Bhutan | 2 | 0 | 1 | 1 | 2 | 3 | −1 | 1 | Advanced to the Knockout stage |
| 3 | Sri Lanka | 2 | 0 | 1 | 1 | 2 | 6 | −4 | 1 | |

Source: SAFF
(H) Hosts

| 5 November 2026 2026 SAFF Championship; Group stage Group A | Bhutan | 0–1 | Bangladesh | Dhaka |
| 20:00 | | SAFF; FIFA | Ibrahim 69' | Stadium: National Stadium; Attendance: 12,783; Referee: Thoriq Alkatiri (Indonesia) |

| 11 November 2026 2026 SAFF Championship; Group stage Group A | Bangladesh | 4–0 | Sri Lanka | Dhaka |
| 20:00 | Shome 8'; Choudhury 44'; Wahid 53'; Rakib 87' | SAFF; FIFA | | Stadium: National Stadium; Attendance: 18,631; Referee: Lê Vũ Linh (Vietnam) |

| 14 November 2026 2026 SAFF Championship; Semi-finals | Bangladesh | 0–1 | Pakistan | Dhaka |
| 20:30 | | Report | Arshad 86' | Stadium: National Stadium; Attendance: 21,983; Referee: Ngô Duy Lân (Vietnam) |

== Under-23/Olympic team ==
=== Bangladesh under-23 football team ===
2026

=== Diamond Jubilee Tournament ===
Group stage

| Pos | Team | Pld | W | D | L | GF | GA | GD | Pts | Status |
|---|---|---|---|---|---|---|---|---|---|---|
| 1 | Pakistan (C) | 3 | 2 | 1 | 0 | 5 | 0 | +5 | 7 | Champions |
| 2 | Afghanistan | 3 | 1 | 1 | 1 | 1 | 2 | −1 | 4 | Runners-up |
| 3 | Bangladesh Olympic | 3 | 0 | 3 | 0 | 1 | 1 | 0 | 3 | |
| 4 | Maldives (H) | 3 | 0 | 1 | 2 | 1 | 5 | −4 | 1 | |

Source: DJIFT
(C) Champions; (H) Hosts

| 1 June 2026 Diamond Jubilee Football Tournament | Pakistan | 0–0 | Bangladesh Olympic | Male, Maldives |
| 16:00 MVT (17:00 BST) | | Report | | Stadium: National Football Stadium; Attendance: 1,200; Referee: Javiz Mohamed (Maldives) |

| 4 June 2026 Diamond Jubilee Football Tournament | Afghanistan | 0–0 | Bangladesh Olympic | Male, Maldives |
| 21:00 MVT (22:00 BST) | | Report | | Stadium: National Football Stadium; Referee: Senthilnathan Sekaran (India) |

| 7 June 2026 Diamond Jubilee Football Tournament | Maldives | 1–1 | Bangladesh Olympic | Male, Maldives |
| 21:00 MVT (20:00 BST) | Fasir 14' (pen.) | Report | Mirajul 54' (pen.) | Stadium: National Football Stadium; Attendance: 2,150; Referee: Senthilnathan Sekaran (India) |

== Under-20 football team ==
=== AFC U-20 Asian Cup qualifiers ===
Group B

| Pos | Team | Pld | W | D | L | GF | GA | GD | Pts | Qualification or relegation |
|---|---|---|---|---|---|---|---|---|---|---|
| 1 | Uzbekistan (H) | 3 | 3 | 0 | 0 | 9 | 0 | +9 | 9 | Qualified for the final tournament |
| 2 | India | 3 | 2 | 0 | 1 | 4 | 4 | 0 | 6 | Qualified for the final tournament |
| 3 | Syria | 3 | 1 | 0 | 2 | 3 | 4 | −1 | 3 | |
| 4 | Bangladesh | 3 | 0 | 0 | 3 | 0 | 8 | −8 | 0 | Relegation to development phase |

Source: AFC
Rules for classification: Qualification tiebreakers
(H) Hosts

| 31 August 2026 2026 AFC U20 Q | Uzbekistan | 0–2 | Bangladesh | Tashkent, Uzbekistan |
| 20:00 BST (UTC+6) | | Report | Saydaliev 19'; Kuvonchbek 46' | Stadium: Do'stlik Stadium; Referee: Wiwat Jumpaoon (Thailand) |

| 3 September 2026 2026 AFC U20 Q | Bangladesh | 0–3 | Syria | Tashkent, Uzbekistan |
| 17:00 BST (UTC+6) | | Report | Alam 44'; Marios 45+1'; Al Najar 90' | Stadium: Do'stlik Stadium; Referee: Ammar Ashkanani (Kuwait) |

| 6 September 2026 2026 AFC U20 Q | India | 3–0 | Bangladesh | Tashkent, Uzbekistan |
| 17:00 BST (UTC+6) | Laishram 25'; Yadav 60'; Arbash 79' | Report | | Stadium: Do'stlik Stadium; Referee: Yudi Nurcahya (Indonesia) |

== Under-17 football team ==
=== AFC U-17 Asian Cup qualifiers ===
Group C

| Pos | Team | Pld | W | D | L | GF | GA | GD | Pts | Qualification |
|---|---|---|---|---|---|---|---|---|---|---|
| 1 | Syria | 4 | 3 | 1 | 0 | 17 | 2 | +15 | 10 | Final tournament |
| 2 | United Arab Emirates (H) | 4 | 3 | 1 | 0 | 9 | 1 | +8 | 10 | |
| 3 | Bangladesh | 4 | 2 | 0 | 2 | 6 | 7 | −1 | 6 | |
| 4 | Macau | 4 | 1 | 0 | 3 | 1 | 5 | −4 | 3 | |
| 5 | Bhutan | 4 | 0 | 0 | 4 | 0 | 18 | −18 | 0 | |

Source: AFC
(H) Hosts

| 8 November 2026 2027 AFC U17 Q | Syria | 5–1 | Bangladesh | Ras Al Khaimah, United Arab Emirates |
| 17:20 UTC+6 | Taha 14' (pen.), 78'; Al Salhani 40' (pen.); Al Hammoud 44'; Maghmoma 90+1' | Report | Bostami 48' | Stadium: Emirates Football Club Stadium; Referee: Mrutyunjay Lingaraj Amatya (India) |

| 14 November 2026 2027 AFC U17 Q | Bangladesh | 4–0 | Bhutan | Ras Al Khaimah, United Arab Emirates |
| 21:20 UTC+6 | Ullah 8'; Ahmmed 15'; Bostami 28'; Arafat 67' | Report | | Stadium: Saud Bin Saqr Al Qasimi Stadium; Referee: Huseen Jamal (Kuwait) |

| 17 November 2026 2027 AFC U17 Q | Bangladesh | 1–0 | Macau | Ras Al Khaimah, United Arab Emirates |
| 17:20 UTC+6 | Mustakim 55' | Report | | Stadium: Saud Bin Saqr Al Qasimi Stadium; Referee: Mahmoud Seifeddine (Lebanon) |

| 20 November 2026 2027 AFC U17 Q | United Arab Emirates | 2–0 | Bangladesh | Ras Al Khaimah, United Arab Emirates |
| 21:20 UTC+6 | Gamal 61' (pen.); Esaadi 90+4' | Report | | Stadium: Emirates Football Club Stadium; Referee: Abdulmajeed Al-Ghadani (Oman) |

== Under-15 football team ==
=== 2026 FIFA U-15 World Cup ===
Group G

| Pos | Team | Pld | W | D | L | GF | GA | GD | Pts | Qualification | Wales | Portugal | Indonesia | Burundi | Bangladesh | Fiji |
|---|---|---|---|---|---|---|---|---|---|---|---|---|---|---|---|---|
| 1 | Wales | 5 | 4 | 1 | 0 | 18 | 3 | +15 | 13 | Advance to Tier A | | 2–1 | 3–0 | 3–1 | 0–0 | 10–1 |
| 2 | Portugal | 5 | 4 | 0 | 1 | 15 | 4 | +11 | 12 | Advance to Tier B | | | 2–1 | 1–0 | 3–1 | 8–0 |
| 3 | Indonesia | 5 | 2 | 1 | 2 | 15 | 8 | +7 | 7 | Advance to Tier C | | | | 6–1 | 1–1 | 7–1 |
| 4 | Burundi | 5 | 2 | 0 | 3 | 6 | 10 | −4 | 6 | Advance to Tier D | | | | | 2–0 | 2–0 |
| 5 | Bangladesh | 5 | 1 | 2 | 2 | 5 | 7 | −2 | 5 | Advance to Tier E | | | | | | 3–1 |
| 6 | Fiji | 5 | 0 | 0 | 5 | 3 | 30 | −27 | 0 | Advance to Tier F | | | | | | |

Source: FIFA
Rules for classification: Qualification stage tiebreakers

Final (129th-place match)

30 October 2026
10:30

| Central African Republic | 4–1 | Bangladesh |
|---|---|---|
| | Report |

Baku Crystal Hall, Baku

== Women's national teams ==
=== Asian Games ===
==== Group F ====
| Pos | Team | Pld | W | D | L | GF | GA | GD | Pts | Qualification |
|---|---|---|---|---|---|---|---|---|---|---|
| 1 | North Korea | 3 | 2 | 1 | 0 | 19 | 1 | +18 | 7 | Advance to knockout stage |
| 2 | South Korea | 3 | 2 | 1 | 0 | 12 | 1 | +11 | 7 | Advance to knockout stage |
| 3 | Myanmar | 3 | 0 | 1 | 2 | 0 | 13 | −13 | 1 | |
| 4 | Bangladesh | 3 | 0 | 1 | 2 | 0 | 16 | −16 | 1 | |

Source: Aichi–Nagoya 26

| 14 September 2026 Football at the 2026 Asian Games Group F | Bangladesh | 0–10 | North Korea | Osaka, Japan |
| 13:00 BST (UTC+6) | | Report | Jon Ryong-Jong 5', 10'; Hwang Yu-Yong 12'; Chae Un-Yong 18', 35'; Kim Kyong-yong 40', 43'; Ri Song-a 51'; Jong Kum 60'; Han Jin-Hong 90' | Stadium: Nagai Stadium; Attendance: 1,343; Referee: Plong Pich Akara (Cambodia) |

| 17 September 2026 Football at the 2026 Asian Games Group F | Bangladesh | 0–6 | South Korea | Osaka, Japan |
| 13:00 BST (UTC+6) | Kim Min-ji 16'; Jeong Da-bin 42'; Choe Yu-ri 65'; Ji So-yun 77'; Hyun Seul-gi 79'; Ko Yoo-jin 90+1' | Report | | Stadium: Nagai Stadium; Attendance: 135; Referee: Fatemeh Nasiri Looshani (Iran) |

| 21 September 2026 Football at the 2026 Asian Games Group F | Bangladesh | 0–0 | Myanmar | Osaka, Japan |
| 13:00 BST (UTC+6) | | Report | | Stadium: Nagai Stadium; Attendance: 571; Referee: Roziyabonu Yusupova (Uzbekistan) |

== Under-17 women's football team ==
=== Friendlies game ===
2026

| 10 September 2026 Friendly | Bangladesh | 5–0 | Jordan | JFA Field, Jordan |
| 20:00 UTC+6 | Alpi 10'; Reya 51'; Mousumi 58'; Kulsum 80'; Payal 90' | Report |

| 13 September 2026 Friendly | Bangladesh | 2–0 | Jordan | JFA Field, Jordan |
| 20:00 UTC+6 | Alpi; Alpi | Report |

=== AFC U-17 Asian Cup qualifiers ===
Group H

| Pos | Team | Pld | W | D | L | GF | GA | GD | Pts | Qualification |
|---|---|---|---|---|---|---|---|---|---|---|
| 1 | Philippines | 2 | 2 | 0 | 0 | 7 | 0 | +7 | 6 | Final tournament |
| 2 | Bangladesh | 2 | 1 | 0 | 1 | 2 | 4 | −2 | 3 | |
| 3 | Uzbekistan (H) | 2 | 0 | 0 | 2 | 1 | 6 | −5 | 0 | |

Source: AFC
Rules for classification: Qualification tiebreakers
(H) Hosts

| 8 October 2026 AFC U-17 Women's Asian Cup Qualification | Bangladesh | 2–1 | Uzbekistan | Tashkent, Uzbekistan |
| 17:00 BST (UTC+6) | Purnima 4'; Runa 90+3' | Report | Lakaeva 17' | Stadium: Do'stlik Stadium; Referee: Elaheh Sinakaei (Iran) |

| 11 October 2026 AFC U-17 Women's Asian Cup Qualification | Philippines | 3–0 | Bangladesh | Tashkent, Uzbekistan |
| 17:00 BST (UTC+6) | Bascara 73'; Granger 90', 90+2' | Report | | Stadium: Do'stlik Stadium; Referee: Nodira Mirzoeva (Tajikistan) |

== Men's clubs league football ==
Bangladesh Football League

League table

| Pos | Team | Pld | W | D | L | GF | GA | GD | Pts | Qualification or relegation |
|---|---|---|---|---|---|---|---|---|---|---|
| 1 | Bangladesh Police | 5 | 4 | 1 | 0 | 14 | 1 | +13 | 13 | Qualification for the AFC; Challenge League qualifying stage |
| 2 | Mohammedan | 4 | 4 | 0 | 0 | 13 | 0 | +13 | 12 | |
| 3 | Bashundhara Kings | 4 | 3 | 1 | 0 | 15 | 3 | +12 | 10 | |
| 4 | City Club | 5 | 3 | 1 | 1 | 12 | 7 | +5 | 10 | |
| 5 | Fortis | 3 | 2 | 1 | 0 | 15 | 3 | +12 | 7 | |
| 6 | Dhaka Abahani | 4 | 2 | 1 | 1 | 9 | 4 | +5 | 7 | |
| 7 | Rahmatganj | 5 | 1 | 3 | 1 | 8 | 8 | 0 | 6 | |
| 8 | Brothers Union | 5 | 1 | 2 | 2 | 5 | 13 | −8 | 5 | |
| 9 | PWD SC | 5 | 0 | 3 | 2 | 2 | 5 | −3 | 3 | |
| 10 | Fakirerpool | 4 | 1 | 0 | 3 | 4 | 13 | −9 | 3 | |
| 11 | Arambagh | 5 | 0 | 3 | 2 | 4 | 14 | −10 | 3 | |
| 12 | Chattogram City | 5 | 0 | 0 | 5 | 4 | 18 | −14 | 0 | Relegation for the Bangladesh Championship League |
| 13 | Dhaka Wanderers | 4 | 0 | 0 | 4 | 2 | 18 | −16 | 0 | Relegation for the Bangladesh Championship League |

Updated to match(es) played on 24 October 2026. Source: Soccerway
Rules for classification: 1) Points; 2) Goal difference; 3) Number of goals scored.

Bangladesh Championship League

League table
Dhaka Senior Division League

League table
Dhaka Senior Division League

== Women's clubs league football ==
Bangladesh Women's Football League

League table

== Cup competitions ==
=== Bangladesh Challenge Cup ===
The match was scheduled for August 21, 2026, but was later cancelled.

Match

21 August 2026
14:30 BST (UTC+6)

| Bashundhara Kings | Cancelled | Dhaka Abahani |

Bashundhara Kings Arena, Dhaka

=== 2026–27 Federation Cup ===
Groups stage

Group A

| Pos | Team | Pld | W | D | L | GF | GA | GD | Pts | Qualification |
|---|---|---|---|---|---|---|---|---|---|---|
| 1 | Brothers Union | 2 | 1 | 1 | 0 | 4 | 1 | +3 | 4 | Qualified for QRF 1 |
| 2 | Chattogram City | 2 | 1 | 1 | 0 | 4 | 2 | +2 | 4 | Advanced to QRF 2 |
| 3 | Dhaka Abahani | 1 | 0 | 1 | 0 | 1 | 1 | 0 | 1 | |
| 4 | Fortis FC | 1 | 0 | 1 | 0 | 1 | 1 | 0 | 1 | |
| 5 | Rahmatganj | 2 | 0 | 1 | 1 | 1 | 3 | −2 | 1 | |
| 6 | Fakirerpool | 2 | 0 | 1 | 1 | 2 | 5 | −3 | 1 | |

Updated to match(es) played on 13 October 2026. Source: Soccerway

Group B

| Pos | Team | Pld | W | D | L | GF | GA | GD | Pts | Qualification |
|---|---|---|---|---|---|---|---|---|---|---|
| 1 | Bashundhara Kings | 2 | 2 | 0 | 0 | 7 | 0 | +7 | 6 | Qualified for QRF 1 |
| 2 | Mohammedan SC | 2 | 1 | 1 | 0 | 4 | 2 | +2 | 4 | Advanced to QRF 2 |
| 3 | Bangladesh Police | 1 | 0 | 1 | 0 | 1 | 1 | 0 | 1 | |
| 4 | PWD SC | 1 | 0 | 1 | 0 | 1 | 1 | 0 | 1 | |
| 5 | Arambagh KS | 2 | 0 | 1 | 1 | 3 | 5 | −2 | 1 | |
| 6 | City Club | 2 | 0 | 1 | 1 | 1 | 3 | −2 | 1 | |
| 7 | Dhaka Wanderers | 2 | 0 | 1 | 1 | 2 | 7 | −5 | 1 | |

Updated to match(es) played on 20 October 2026. Source: Soccerway

== Club Competitions (Continental) ==
=== AFC Challenge League ===
==== Preliminary stage ====
| 11 August 2026 Preliminary Round | Fortis (Bangladesh) | 1–0 | (Kyrgyzstan) Muras United | Dhaka, Bangladesh |
| 15:00 BST (UTC+6) | Ibrahim 52' | AFC Report; GSA Report | | Stadium: Bashundhara Kings Arena; Attendance: 2,113; Referee: Husain Al Showaikh (Bahrain) |

| 11 August 2026 Preliminary Round | Al Ittihad Ahli (Syria) | 1–0 | Bangladesh Police | Amman, Jordan |
| 23:00 BST (UTC+6) | Jordan 44' | AFC Report; GSA Report | | Stadium: King Abdullah II Stadium; Attendance: 500; Referee: Amirçon Horkašev (Tajikistan) |

==== Group stage ====
Group C

| Pos | Team | Pld | W | D | L | GF | GA | GD | Pts | Qualification | QAD | FOR | GOA | REG |
|---|---|---|---|---|---|---|---|---|---|---|---|---|---|---|
| 1 | (Kuwait) Al-Qadsia (H) | 3 | 3 | 0 | 0 | 6 | 1 | +5 | 9 | Quarter-finals | | 3–0 | 2–1 | 1–0 |
| 2 | (Bangladesh) Fortis | 3 | 1 | 0 | 2 | 4 | 6 | −2 | 3 (Note: Head-to-head goals scored: Fortis 1, Goa 0, Regar-TadAZ –1.) | | | | 1–2 | 3–1 |
| 3 | (India) Goa | 3 | 1 | 0 | 2 | 4 | 5 | −1 | 3 | | | | | 1–2 |
| 4 | (Tajikistan) Regar-TadAZ | 3 | 1 | 0 | 2 | 3 | 5 | −2 | 3 | | | | | |

Source: AFC
Rules for classification: Group stage tiebreakers
(H) Hosts
Notes:

| 17 October 2026 Group stage | Al-Qadsia (Kuwait) | 0–3 | (Bangladesh) Fortis | Hawally, Kuwait |
| 23:30 BST (UTC+6) | | AFC Report; GSA Report | Khabba 20'; Lakhdar 71'; Abdalla 90' | Stadium: Mohammed Al-Hamad Stadium; Attendance: 1,096; Referee: Izzul Fikri (Malaysia) |

| 20 October 2026 Group stage | (Bangladesh) Fortis | 1–2 | (India) Goa | Hawally, Kuwait |
| 19:25 BST (UTC+6) | Tudu 78' | AFC Report; GSA Report | Ortiz 6'; Chiki 85' | Stadium: Mohammed Al-Hamad Stadium; Attendance: 120; Referee: Mohamed Javiz (Maldives) |

| 23 October 2026 Group stage | (Bangladesh) Fortis | 3–1 | (Tajikistan) Regar-TadAZ | Hawally, Kuwait |
| 19:25 BST (UTC+6) | Tudu 67'; Kawasaki 71'; Itofusa 88' | AFC Report; GSA Report | Makhamadiev 12' | Stadium: Mohammed Al-Hamad Stadium; Attendance: 156; Referee: Sashanka Madushanka (Sri Lanka) |

== Women's Club Competitions (Continental) ==
=== AFC Women's Champions ===
==== Preliminary stage ====
| Pos | Team | Pld | W | D | L | GF | GA | GD | Pts | Qualification |
|---|---|---|---|---|---|---|---|---|---|---|
| 1 | (India) East Bengal | 3 | 3 | 0 | 0 | 18 | 0 | +18 | 9 | Advance to group stage |
| 2 | (Malaysia) Sabah (H) | 3 | 2 | 0 | 1 | 15 | 3 | +12 | 6 | |
| 3 | (Bangladesh) Rajshahi Stars | 3 | 1 | 0 | 2 | 9 | 6 | +3 | 3 | |
| 4 | (Guam) Rovers | 3 | 0 | 0 | 3 | 0 | 33 | −33 | 0 | |

Source: AFC
Rules for classification: Tiebreakers
(H) Hosts

| 17 August 2026 Preliminary Round | East Bengal (All India Football Federation) | 0–4 | (Bangladesh Football Federation) Rajshahi Stars | Sabah, Malaysia |
| 14:00 BST (UTC+6) | Anokye 9', 38'; Oraon 26'; Guguloth 71' | AFC Report; GSA Report | | Stadium: Likas Stadium; Attendance: 80; Referee: Mu Mingxin (China) |

| 20 August 2026 Preliminary Round | Rajshahi Stars (Bangladesh Football Federation) | 1–2 | (Football Association of Malaysia) Sabah | Sabah, Malaysia |
| 18:00 BST (UTC+6) | Sultana 87' | AFC Report; GSA Report | Broussard 42', 80' | Stadium: Likas Stadium; Attendance: 1,200; Referee: Rawdha Almansoori (United Arab Emirates) |

| 23 August 2026 Preliminary Round | Rovers (Guam Football Association) | 0–8 | (Bangladesh Football Federation) Rajshahi Stars | Sabah, Malaysia |
| 16:00 BST (UTC+6) | | AFC Report; GSA Report | Shamsunnahar 3', 71'; Tohura 17', 25', 60'; Connelley 53' (o.g.); Monika 53'; Shams 90+5' | Stadium: Likas Stadium; Attendance: 40; Referee: Natalia Sotnikova (Tajikistan) |

== See also ==
- 2026–27 in Indian football
