= 2026–27 AFC Challenge League group stage =

Football tournament group stage

The 2026–27 AFC Challenge League group stage was played from 17 to 24 October 2026. The top two teams from each group qualified for the knockout stage.

== Draw ==
The draw for the group stage was held at the AFC House in Kuala Lumpur, Malaysia on 20 August 2026. The 20 teams were drawn into five groups: three comprising four teams from the West (groups A–C) and two comprising four teams from the East region (groups D–E). Teams were seeded ino four pots for West and East each, and drawn into the relevant positions within each group, based on their association ranking. Teams from the same association could not be drawn into the same group.

The following 20 teams entered the group stage draw, which included the eight direct entrants, three losers from the AFC Champions League Two qualifying play-offs, and the nine winners of the preliminary stage.

Region	Groups	Pot 1	Pot 2	Pot 3	Pot 4
West Region	A–C	(Kuwait) Al-Arabi^{ACL2}	(Kuwait) Al-Qadsia (H)	(Tajikistan) Istiklol (H)	(Bhutan) Paro^{PS} (H)
West Region	A–C	(India) Goa^{ACL2}	(Lebanon) Al-Ansar	(Syria) Al-Ittihad Ahli^{PS}	(Tajikistan) Regar-TadAZ^{PS}
West Region	A–C	(Turkmenistan) Ahal	(Lebanon) Nejmeh	(Bangladesh) Fortis^{PS}	(Syria) Homs Al-Fidaa^{PS}
East Region	D–E	(Philippines) Manila Digger^{ACL2}	(Philippines) ~~One Taguig~~ (W)	(Chinese Taipei) Hang Yuan^{PS}	(Brunei) Kasuka^{PS}
East Region	D–E	(Indonesia) Borneo (H)	(Myanmar) Shan United (H)	(Chinese Taipei) Tainan City^{PS}	(Myanmar) Yangon United^{PS}

Legend

- ACL2: AFC Champions League Two qualifying play-off losers
- PS: Preliminary stage winners
- H: Host
- W: Withdrew

== Format ==
In the group stage, each group was played in a single round-robin format on a centralised venue. Eight teams progressed to the quarter-finals of the knockout stage: the three group winners and the best-ranked runner-up from the West, along with the group winners and runners-up from both East groups.

=== Tiebreakers ===
The teams were ranked according to points (3 points for a win, 1 point for a draw, 0 points for a loss). If tied on points, tiebreakers were applied in the following order (Regulations Article 8.3):

1. Points in head-to-head matches among tied teams;
2. Goal difference in head-to-head matches among tied teams;
3. Goals scored in head-to-head matches among tied teams;
4. If more than two teams were tied, and after applying all head-to-head criteria above, a subset of teams were still tied, all head-to-head criteria above were reapplied exclusively to this subset of teams;
5. Goal difference in all group matches;
6. Goals scored in all group matches;
7. Penalty shoot-out if only two teams playing each other in the last round of the group are tied;
8. Disciplinary points (yellow card = 1 point, red card as a result of two yellow cards = 3 points, direct red card = 3 points, yellow card followed by direct red card = 4 points);
9. Drawing of lots.

== Schedule ==
The schedule of the group stage was as follows.

Round	Dates (West region)	Dates (East region)
Matchday 1	17 October 2026	18 October 2026
Matchday 2	20 October 2026	21 October 2026
Matchday 3	23 October 2026	24 October 2026

== Groups ==
=== West Region ===
==== Group A ====
Pos	Team	Pld	W	D	L	GF	GA	GD	Pts	Qualification	ANS	ITT	AHA	PAR
1	(Lebanon) Al-Ansar	3	2	0	1	5	3	+2	6 (Note: Head-to-head Points: Al-Ansar 3, Al-Ittihad 0.)	Quarter-finals		2–0	1–2	2–1
2	(Syria) Al-Ittihad Ahli	3	2	0	1	7	4	+3	6	Quarter-finals			5–1	2–1
3	(Turkmenistan) Ahal	3	1	1	1	5	8	−3	4					2–2
4	(Bhutan) Paro (H)	3	0	1	2	4	6	−2	1					

Source: AFC
Rules for classification: Group stage tiebreakers
(H) Hosts
Notes:
17 October 2026
18:00 UTC+6

Ahal (Turkmenistan)	2–2	(Bhutan) Paro
Jumadurdyýew 27'; Gowşudow 38'	Report	Jawara 54'; Jallow 90'

Changlimithang Stadium, Thimphu
Attendance: 3,100
Referee: Hussain Sinan (Maldives)
17 October 2026
21:00 UTC+6

Al-Ansar (Lebanon)	2–0	(Syria) Al-Ittihad Ahli
Bader 45+1'; Matar 54'	Report

Changlimithang Stadium, Thimphu
Attendance: 658
Referee: Sanzhar Zhakypbekov (Kyrgyzstan)

20 October 2026
18:00 UTC+6

Paro (Bhutan)	1–2	(Lebanon) Al-Ansar
Mishima 1'	Report	Tall 19', 42'

Changlimithang Stadium, Thimphu
Attendance: 2,900
Referee: Sajëçon Zajniddinov (Tajikistan)
20 October 2026
21:00 UTC+6

Al-Ittihad Ahli (Syria)	5–1	(Turkmenistan) Ahal
Ashkar 34'; A. Firmino 51', 61'; Al Hasan 80', 89'	Report	Annaýew 88'

Changlimithang Stadium, Thimphu
Attendance: 550
Referee: Aditya Purkayastha (India)

23 October 2026
18:00 UTC+6

Ahal (Turkmenistan)	2–1	(Lebanon) Al-Ansar
Mämiýew 45' (pen.); Gowşudow 77'	Report	M. Osman 88'

Changlimithang Stadium, Thimphu
Attendance: 506
Referee: Sanzhar Zhakypbekov (Kyrgyzstan)
23 October 2026
21:00 UTC+6

Al-Ittihad Ahli (Syria)	2–1	(Bhutan) Paro
A. Firmino 56'; Rihanieh 86'	Report	Kurdi 76' (o.g.)

Changlimithang Stadium, Thimphu
Attendance: 1,100
Referee: Said Al-Mezeini (Oman)

==== Group B ====
Pos	Team	Pld	W	D	L	GF	GA	GD	Pts	Qualification	HFD	NEJ	IST	ARA
1	(Syria) Homs Al-Fidaa	3	3	0	0	5	1	+4	9	Quarter-finals		2–1	2–0	1–0
2	(Lebanon) Nejmeh	3	2	0	1	5	3	+2	6				1–0	3–1
3	(Tajikistan) Istiklol (H)	3	1	0	2	2	3	−1	3					2–0
4	(Kuwait) Al-Arabi	3	0	0	3	1	6	−5	0					

Source: AFC
Rules for classification: Group stage tiebreakers
(H) Hosts
17 October 2026
16:00 UTC+5

Al-Arabi (Kuwait)	0–1	(Syria) Homs Al-Fidaa
	Report	Politino 33'

Hisor Central Stadium, Hisor
Attendance: 115
Referee: Wong Wai Lun (Hong Kong)
17 October 2026
19:00 UTC+5

Nejmeh (Lebanon)	1–0	(Tajikistan) Istiklol
Gbadamosi 21'	Report

Hisor Central Stadium, Hisor
Attendance: 5,350
Referee: Amir Arab Baraghi (Iran)

20 October 2026
16:00 UTC+5

Homs Al-Fidaa (Syria)	2–1	(Lebanon) Nejmeh
Will 14'; Barakat 62'	Report	Knani 22'

Hisor Central Stadium, Hisor
Attendance: 100
Referee: Torphong Somsing (Thailand)
20 October 2026
19:00 UTC+5

Istiklol (Tajikistan)	2–0	(Kuwait) Al-Arabi
Soirov 38'; A. Shukurov 85'	Report

Hisor Central Stadium, Hisor
Attendance: 5,120
Referee: Sekaran Senthilnathan (India)

23 October 2026
16:00 UTC+5

Al-Arabi (Kuwait)	1–3	(Lebanon) Nejmeh
Ould-Chikh 39'	Report	Kassas 45+3'; Haidar 58'; El Fadl 90+2'

Hisor Central Stadium, Hisor
Attendance: 100
Referee: Wong Wai Lun (Hong Kong)
23 October 2026
19:00 UTC+5

Istiklol (Tajikistan)	0–2	(Syria) Homs Al-Fidaa
	Report	Alghoul 47'; Al Rifai 89'

Hisor Central Stadium, Hisor
Attendance: 6,330
Referee: Naufal Adya Fairuski (Indonesia)

==== Group C ====
Pos	Team	Pld	W	D	L	GF	GA	GD	Pts	Qualification	QAD	FOR	GOA	REG
1	(Kuwait) Al-Qadsia (H)	3	3	0	0	6	1	+5	9	Quarter-finals		3–0	2–1	1–0
2	(Bangladesh) Fortis	3	1	0	2	4	6	−2	3 (Note: Head-to-head goals scored: Fortis 1, Goa 0, Regar-TadAZ –1.)				1–2	3–1
3	(India) Goa	3	1	0	2	4	5	−1	3					1–2
4	(Tajikistan) Regar-TadAZ	3	1	0	2	3	5	−2	3					

Source: AFC
Rules for classification: Group stage tiebreakers
(H) Hosts
Notes:
17 October 2026
16:25 UTC+3

Goa (India)	1–2	(Tajikistan) Regar-TadAZ
Chiki 7'	Report	Davlatov 85', 90'

Mohammed Al-Hamad Stadium, Hawally
Attendance: 298
Referee: Wissam Rabbie (Syria)
17 October 2026
20:30 UTC+3

Al-Qadsia (Kuwait)	3–0	(Bangladesh) Fortis
Khabba 20' (pen.); Lakhdar 71'; Abdalla 90'	Report

Mohammed Al-Hamad Stadium, Hawally
Attendance: 1,096
Referee: Izzul Fikri (Malaysia)

20 October 2026
16:25 UTC+3

Fortis (Bangladesh)	1–2	(India) Goa
Tudu 78'	Report	Ortiz 6'; Chiki 85'

Mohammed Al-Hamad Stadium, Hawally
Attendance: 120
Referee: Mohamed Javiz (Maldives)
20 October 2026
20:30 UTC+3

Regar-TadAZ (Tajikistan)	0–1	(Kuwait) Al-Qadsia
	Report	Al-Rawahi 45+1'

Mohammed Al-Hamad Stadium, Hawally
Attendance: 756
Referee: Mahmood Al-Majarafi (Oman)

23 October 2026
16:25 UTC+3

Fortis (Bangladesh)	3–1	(Tajikistan) Regar-TadAZ
Tudu 67'; Kawasaki 71'; Itofusa 88'	Report	Makhamadiev 12'

Mohammed Al-Hamad Stadium, Hawally
Attendance: 156
Referee: Sashanka Madushanka (Sri Lanka)
23 October 2026
20:30 UTC+3

Goa (India)	1–2	(Kuwait) Al-Qadsia
Chiki 21'	Report	Khabba 10', 49'

Mohammed Al-Hamad Stadium, Hawally
Attendance: 3,000
Referee: Izzul Fikri (Malaysia)

==== Ranking of second-placed teams ====
Pos	Grp	Team	Pld	W	D	L	GF	GA	GD	Pts	Qualification
1	A	(Syria) Al-Ittihad Ahli	3	2	0	1	7	4	+3	6	Quarter-finals
2	B	(Lebanon) Nejmeh	3	2	0	1	5	3	+2	6	
3	C	(Bangladesh) Fortis	3	1	0	2	4	6	−2	3	

Source: AFC
Rules for classification: 1) points; 2) goal difference; 3) number of goals scored; 4) fair play ranking; 5) drawing of lots

=== East Region ===
==== Group D ====
Pos	Team	Pld	W	D	L	GF	GA	GD	Pts	Qualification	BOR	TSG	YAN	~~TAG~~
1	(Indonesia) Borneo	2	2	0	0	5	1	+4	6	Quarter-finals		3–1	2–0	~~24 Oct~~
2	(Chinese Taipei) Tainan City	2	0	1	1	2	4	−2	1	Quarter-finals			1–1	~~18 Oct~~
3	(Myanmar) Yangon United	2	0	1	1	1	3	−2	1					~~21 Oct~~
4	(Philippines) ~~One Taguig~~ (W)	0	0	0	0	0	0	0	0	Withdrew (Note: One Taguig withdrew after the Philippine Football Federation revoked their club license due to outstanding player and staff remuneration.)				

Source: AFC
Rules for classification: Group stage tiebreakers
(W) Withdrawn
Notes:
18 October 2026
20:00 UTC+8

Borneo (Indonesia)	2–0	(Myanmar) Yangon United
Mendonça 53'; M. Diarra 81'	Report

Segiri Stadium, Samarinda
Attendance: 1,629
Referee: Akobirkhuja Shukurullaev (Uzbekistan)

21 October 2026
20:00 UTC+8

Tainan City (Chinese Taipei)	1–3	(Indonesia) Borneo
Kim Sang-Jun 11'	Report	Juan Villa 51'; N'Goma 57'; Brkić 82'

Segiri Stadium, Samarinda
Attendance: 1,993
Referee: Lakmal Weerakkody (Sri Lanka)

24 October 2026
20:00 UTC+8

Tainan City (Chinese Taipei)	1–1	(Myanmar) Yangon United
Opoku 74'	Report	Djidjiwa 56'

Segiri Stadium, Samarinda
Attendance: 505
Referee: Ahmad Al-Khawaldeh (Jordan)

==== Group E ====
Pos	Team	Pld	W	D	L	GF	GA	GD	Pts	Qualification	MDF	SHU	KFC	NTH
1	(Philippines) Manila Digger	3	2	1	0	10	1	+9	7	Quarter-finals		4–0	5–0	1–1
2	(Myanmar) Shan United (H)	3	1	1	1	3	5	−2	4	Quarter-finals			0–2	1–1
3	(Brunei) Kasuka	3	1	0	2	2	8	−6	3					1–2
4	(Chinese Taipei) Hang Yuan	3	0	2	1	3	4	−1	2					

Source: AFC
Rules for classification: Group stage tiebreakers
(H) Hosts
18 October 2026
16:00 UTC+6:30

Shan United (Myanmar)	1–1	(Chinese Taipei) Hang Yuan
Thet Wai Moe 65'	Report	Lin Hai-cheng 53'

Thuwunna Stadium, Yangon
Attendance: 2,455
Referee: Virendha Rai (Bhutan)
18 October 2026
19:00 UTC+6:30

Manila Digger (Philippines)	5–0	(Brunei) Kasuka
Badjie 27'; Sambou 39'; de Bruycker 49'; Ceesay 51'; Wamba Tafem 63'	Report

Thuwunna Stadium, Yangon
Attendance: 30
Referee: Amirjon Khorkashev (Tajikistan)

21 October 2026
16:00 UTC+6:30

Kasuka (Brunei)	0–2	(Myanmar) Shan United
	Report	Nanitelamio 34'; Édson 45'

Thuwunna Stadium, Yangon
Attendance: 1,150
Referee: Mohammed Al-Mazyed (Qatar)
21 October 2026
19:00 UTC+6:30

Hang Yuan (Chinese Taipei)	1–1	(Philippines) Manila Digger
Lin Hai-cheng 39'	Report	Touray 20'

Thuwunna Stadium, Yangon
Attendance: 134
Referee: Abdurashid Khudoyberganov (Uzbekistan)

24 October 2026
16:00 UTC+6:30

Manila Digger (Philippines)	4–0	(Myanmar) Shan United
de Bruycker 29'; Ceesay 31'; Godwin 87', 90+4'	Report

Thuwunna Stadium, Yangon
Attendance: 1,580
Referee: Amirjon Khorkashev (Tajikistan)
24 October 2026
19:00 UTC+6:30

Hang Yuan (Chinese Taipei)	1–2	(Brunei) Kasuka
Wang Po-ying 42' (pen.)	Report	Paula 6', 80'

Thuwunna Stadium, Yangon
Attendance: 30
Referee: Marwan Al-Ismail (Jordan)

== See also ==
- 2026–27 AFC Champions League Elite league stage
- 2026–27 AFC Champions League Two group stage
