= Kuwait national football team results (2000–2009) =

This article provides details of international football games played by the Kuwait national football team from 2000 to 2009.

== Results ==
=== 2000 ===
31 January 2000 Friendly	Kuwait	4–0	Syria	Kuwait
--:-- UTC+3

4 February 2000 Friendly	Kuwait	1–1	Iran	Kuwait
--:-- UTC+3

10 February 2000 2000 Asian Cup qualification	Kuwait	6–1	Turkmenistan	Kuwait
--:-- UTC+3

14 February 2000 2000 Asian Cup qualification	Kuwait	20–0	Bhutan	Kuwait
--:-- UTC+3

16 February 2000 2000 Asian Cup qualification	Kuwait	2–0	Yemen	Kuwait
--:-- UTC+3

18 February 2000 2000 Asian Cup qualification	Kuwait	5–0	Nepal	Kuwait
--:-- UTC+3

25 June 2000 Friendly	Lebanon	3–1	Kuwait
--:-- UTC+3

24 September 2000 Friendly	Kuwait	1–0	Qatar
--:-- UTC+3

4 October 2000 Friendly	Australia	1–0	Kuwait
--:-- UTC+3

7 October 2000 2000 Asian Cup	United Arab Emirates	1–0	Kuwait
--:-- UTC+3

13 October 2000 2000 Asian Cup	Kuwait	0–0	Indonesia	Lebanon
--:-- UTC+3

16 October 2000 2000 Asian Cup	Kuwait	1–0	South Korea	Lebanon
--:-- UTC+3

19 October 2000 2000 Asian Cup	China	0–0	Kuwait	Lebanon
--:-- UTC+3

24 October 2000 2000 Asian Cup	Saudi Arabia	3–2	Kuwait	Lebanon
--:-- UTC+3

=== 2001 ===
12 January 2001 Friendly	Qatar	1–0	Kuwait
--:-- UTC+3

18 January 2001 Friendly	Kuwait	3–1	Syria
--:-- UTC+3

23 January 2001 Friendly	Thailand	5–4	Kuwait
--:-- UTC+3

3 February 2001 2002 World Cup qualification	Bahrain	1–2	Kuwait	Bahrain
--:-- UTC+3

6 February 2001 2002 World Cup qualification	Kuwait	1–1	Singapore	Kuwait
--:-- UTC+3

9 February 2001 2002 World Cup qualification	Kyrgyzstan	0–3	Kuwait	Kyrgyzstan
--:-- UTC+3

15 February 2001 Friendly	Kuwait	4–3	Finland	Kuwait
--:-- UTC+3

21 February 2001 2002 World Cup qualification	Singapore	1–0	Kuwait	Singapore
--:-- UTC+8

24 February 2001 2002 World Cup qualification	Kuwait	2–0	Kyrgyzstan	Kuwait
--:-- UTC+3

27 February 2001 2002 World Cup qualification	Kuwait	0–1	Bahrain	Kuwait
--:-- UTC+3

3 August 2001	Kuwait	1–1	Trinidad and Tobago
--:-- UTC+3

5 August 2001	North Korea	1–1	Kuwait
--:-- UTC+3

29 November 2001 Friendly	Oman	1–1	Kuwait
--:-- UTC+3

29 December 2001 Friendly	Kuwait	0–0	Syria
--:-- UTC+3

31 December 2001 Friendly	Kuwait	2–2	Syria
--:-- UTC+3

=== 2002 ===
3 January 2002 Friendly	Kuwait	1–1	Romania
--:-- UTC+3

5 January 2002 Friendly	Kuwait	3–0	Zimbabwe
--:-- UTC+3

8 January 2002 Friendly	Kuwait	0–0	Iceland
--:-- UTC+3

16 January 2002 2002 Gulf Cup	Saudi Arabia	1–1	Kuwait	Saudi Arabia
--:-- UTC+3

19 January 2002 2002 Gulf Cup	Kuwait	1–3	Oman	Saudi Arabia
--:-- UTC+3

22 January 2002 2002 Gulf Cup	Kuwait	0–0	Bahrain	Saudi Arabia
--:-- UTC+3

26 January 2002 2002 Gulf Cup	Kuwait	0–1	Qatar	Saudi Arabia
--:-- UTC+3

29 January 2002 2002 Gulf Cup	Kuwait	2–1	United Arab Emirates	Saudi Arabia
--:-- UTC+3

4 April 2002	Kuwait	3–1	Qatar	Kuwait
--:-- UTC+3

6 April 2002	Kuwait	1–1	Syria	Kuwait
--:-- UTC+3

10 April 2002	Kuwait	7–0	Palestine	Kuwait
--:-- UTC+3

12 April 2002	Kuwait	0–0	Iran	Kuwait
--:-- UTC+3

9 May 2002 Friendly	Germany	7–0	Kuwait	Freiburg, Germany
--:-- UTC+2				Attendance: 22,000

23 May 2002 Friendly	Kuwait	0–0	Iran
--:-- UTC+3

30 May 2002 Friendly	Kuwait	1–3	Iran
--:-- UTC+3

16 December 2002	Kuwait	1–1	Morocco	Kuwait
--:-- UTC+3

18 December 2002	Kuwait	1–0	Sudan	Kuwait
--:-- UTC+3

23 December 2002	Kuwait	1–2	Jordan	Kuwait
--:-- UTC+3

25 December 2002	Kuwait	3–3	Palestine	Kuwait
--:-- UTC+3

=== 2003 ===
3 March 2003 Friendly	Egypt	0–0	Kuwait
--:-- UTC+3

4 September 2003	Singapore	1–3	Kuwait	Singapore
--:-- UTC+3

14 September 2003	Kuwait	2–1	Qatar	Hawally, Kuwait
--:-- UTC+3				Stadium: Mohammed Al-Hamad Stadium; Attendance: 20,000

20 September 2003	Qatar	2–2	Kuwait	Qatar
--:-- UTC+3

27 September 2003	Kuwait	4–0	Singapore	Kuwait
--:-- UTC+3

5 October 2003	Kuwait	2–1	Palestine	Hawally, Kuwait
--:-- UTC+3				Stadium: Mohammed Al-Hamad Stadium

8 October 2003	Palestine	0–4	Kuwait	Hawally, Kuwait (Note: Palestine played their home game against Kuwait due to security concerns stemming from the Second Intifada.)
--:-- UTC+3				Stadium: Mohammed Al-Hamad Stadium

19 November 2003 Friendly	Portugal	8–0	Kuwait	Leiria, Portugal
--:-- UTC+0				Attendance: 22,000

2 December 2003 Friendly	Kuwait	3–1	Iran
--:-- UTC+3

16 December 2003 Friendly	Kuwait	2–0	Lebanon	Larnaca, Cyprus
--:-- UTC+2

18 December 2003 Friendly	Lebanon	0–0	Kuwait	Larnaca, Cyprus
--:-- UTC+2

20 December 2003 Friendly	Latvia	0–2	Kuwait	Larnaca, Cyprus
--:-- UTC+2				Stadium: Pafiako Stadium; Attendance: 150; Referee: Costas Kapitanis (Cyprus)

26 December 2003 2003 Gulf Cup	Kuwait	0–0	Oman	Kuwait
--:-- UTC+3

29 December 2003 2003 Gulf Cup	Kuwait	0–2	United Arab Emirates	Kuwait
--:-- UTC+3

=== 2004 ===
1 January 2004 2003 Gulf Cup	Kuwait	4–0	Yemen	Kuwait
--:-- UTC+3

4 January 2004 2003 Gulf Cup	Kuwait	1–1	Saudi Arabia	Kuwait
--:-- UTC+3

8 January 2004 2003 Gulf Cup	Kuwait	1–2	Qatar	Kuwait
--:-- UTC+3

10 January 2004 2003 Gulf Cup	Kuwait	0–4	Bahrain	Kuwait
--:-- UTC+3

18 February 2004 2006 World Cup qualification	China	1–0	Kuwait	China
--:-- UTC+8

31 March 2004 2006 World Cup qualification	Malaysia	0–2	Kuwait	Malaysia
--:-- UTC+8

1 June 2004 Friendly	Kuwait	0–1	Syria
--:-- UTC+3

3 June 2004 Friendly	Kuwait	1–2	Syria
--:-- UTC+3

9 June 2004 2006 World Cup qualification	Kuwait	4–0	Hong Kong	Kuwait
--:-- UTC+3

19 July 2004	Kuwait	3–1	United Arab Emirates	China
--:-- UTC+8

23 July 2004	Jordan	2–0	Kuwait	China
--:-- UTC+8

27 July 2004	South Korea	4–0	Kuwait	China
--:-- UTC+8

26 August 2004 Friendly	Bahrain	0–0	Kuwait
--:-- UTC+3

1 September 2004 Friendly	Saudi Arabia	1–1	Kuwait
--:-- UTC+3

8 September 2004 2006 World Cup qualification	Hong Kong	0–2	Kuwait	Hong Kong
--:-- UTC+8

29 September 2004 Friendly	Kuwait	1–1	Syria
--:-- UTC+3

3 October 2004 Friendly	Lebanon	1–3	Kuwait	Tripoli, Lebanon
--:-- UTC+3

6 October 2004 Friendly	Lebanon	1–1	Kuwait	Beirut, Lebanon
--:-- UTC+3

13 October 2004 2006 World Cup qualification	Kuwait	1–0	China	Kuwait
--:-- UTC+3

5 November 2004 Friendly	Kuwait	2–3	India
--:-- UTC+3

10 November 2004 Friendly	Kuwait	3–0	Kyrgyzstan
--:-- UTC+3

17 November 2004 2006 World Cup qualification	Kuwait	6–1	Malaysia	Kuwait
--:-- UTC+3

3 December 2004 Friendly	United Arab Emirates	1–1	Kuwait
--:-- UTC+3

6 December 2004 Friendly	Kuwait	3–0	Tajikistan
--:-- UTC+3

11 December 2004 2004 Gulf Cup	Saudi Arabia	1–2	Kuwait	Qatar
--:-- UTC+3

14 December 2004 2004 Gulf Cup	Kuwait	1–1	Bahrain	Qatar
--:-- UTC+3

17 December 2004 2004 Gulf Cup	Kuwait	3–0	Yemen	Qatar
--:-- UTC+3

20 December 2004 2004 Gulf Cup	Kuwait	0–2	Qatar	Qatar
--:-- UTC+3

23 December 2004 2004 Gulf Cup	Bahrain	3–1	Kuwait	Qatar
--:-- UTC+3

=== 2005 ===
22 January 2005 Friendly	Kuwait	1–1	Norway
--:-- UTC+3

26 January 2005 Friendly	Kuwait	3–2	Syria
--:-- UTC+3

3 February 2005 Friendly	North Korea	0–0	Kuwait
--:-- UTC+3

9 February 2005 2006 World Cup qualification	South Korea	2–0	Kuwait	South Korea
--:-- UTC+9

12 March 2005 Friendly	Kuwait	0–1	Finland
--:-- UTC+3

18 March 2005 Friendly	Kuwait	3–1	Armenia	United Arab Emirates
--:-- UTC+3

25 March 2005 2006 World Cup qualification	Kuwait	2–1	Uzbekistan	Kuwait
--:-- UTC+3

30 March 2005 2006 World Cup qualification	Kuwait	0–0	South Korea	Kuwait
--:-- UTC+3

27 May 2005 Friendly	Kuwait	0–1	Egypt	Kuwait
--:-- UTC+3

3 June 2005 2006 World Cup qualification	Saudi Arabia	3–0	Kuwait
--:-- UTC+3

8 June 2005 2006 World Cup qualification	Kuwait	0–4	South Korea	Kuwait
--:-- UTC+3

17 August 2005 2006 World Cup qualification	Uzbekistan	3–2	Kuwait	Uzbekistan
--:-- UTC+5

26 November 2005 Friendly	Kuwait	0–0	Iraq
--:-- UTC+3

=== 2006 ===
3 February 2006 Friendly	Kuwait	2–2	Singapore
--:-- UTC+3

7 February 2006 Friendly	Kuwait	2–1	Jordan
--:-- UTC+3

22 February 2006 2007 Asian Cup qualification	Lebanon	1–1	Kuwait	Beirut, Lebanon
19:00 UTC+3				Stadium: Beirut Municipal Stadium

1 March 2006 2007 Asian Cup qualification	Kuwait	0–0	Bahrain	Kuwait City, Kuwait
18:15 UTC+3				Stadium: Kuwait National Stadium

23 July 2006 Friendly	Greuther Fürth (Germany)	6–1	Kuwait	Germany
			Bader 56'	Attendance: 1,500; Referee: Stein

16 August 2006 2007 Asian Cup qualification	Australia	2–0	Kuwait	Sydney, Australia
19:30 UTC+11				Stadium: Aussie Stadium

6 September 2006 2007 Asian Cup qualification	Kuwait	2–0	Australia	Kuwait City, Kuwait
20:30 UTC+3				Stadium: Kuwait National Stadium

11 October 2006 Friendly	Kuwait	1–0	Lithuania
--:-- UTC+3

9 November 2006 Friendly	Kuwait	10–0	Chinese Taipei
--:-- UTC+3

15 November 2006 2007 Asian Cup qualification	Bahrain	2–1	Kuwait	Riffa, Bahrain
18:00 UTC+3				Stadium: Bahrain National Stadium

=== 2007 ===
17 January 2007 2007 Gulf Cup	Kuwait	1–1	Yemen	Abu Dhabi, United Arab Emirates
--:-- UTC+3				Stadium: Zayed Sports City Stadium

20 January 2007 2007 Gulf Cup	Kuwait	1–2	Oman	Abu Dhabi, United Arab Emirates
--:-- UTC+3				Stadium: Mohammed bin Zayed Stadium

23 January 2007 2007 Gulf Cup	United Arab Emirates	3–2	Kuwait	Abu Dhabi, United Arab Emirates
--:-- UTC+3				Stadium: Mohammed bin Zayed Stadium

5 June 2007 Friendly	Kuwait	1–1	Portugal
--:-- UTC+3

12 June 2007 Friendly	Kuwait	1–1	Egypt
--:-- UTC+3

8 October 2007 2010 World Cup qualification	Bhutan	v	Kuwait	Bhutan
--:-- UTC+6

28 October 2007 2010 World Cup qualification	Kuwait	v	Bhutan	Kuwait
--:-- UTC+3

=== 2008 ===
2 January 2008 Friendly	Kuwait	3–2	Lebanon
--:-- UTC+3

12 January 2008 Friendly	Kuwait	0–2	Ivory Coast
--:-- UTC+3

16 January 2008 Friendly	Bahrain	1–0	Kuwait
--:-- UTC+3

24 January 2008 Friendly	Kuwait	0–2	Singapore
--:-- UTC+3

30 January 2008 Friendly	Oman	1–1	Kuwait
--:-- UTC+3

6 February 2008 2010 World Cup qualification	United Arab Emirates	2–0	Kuwait	United Arab Emirates
--:-- UTC+3

21 March 2008 Friendly	Kuwait	0–0	Iraq
--:-- UTC+3

26 March 2008 2010 World Cup qualification	Kuwait	2–2	Iran	Kuwait
--:-- UTC+3

23 May 2008 Friendly	Qatar	1–1	Kuwait
--:-- UTC+3

27 May 2008 Friendly	Saudi Arabia	2–1	Kuwait
--:-- UTC+3

2 June 2008 2010 World Cup qualification	Syria	1–0	Kuwait	Damascus, Syria
--:-- UTC+3

8 June 2008 2010 World Cup qualification	Kuwait	4–2	Syria	Kuwait
--:-- UTC+3

14 June 2008 2010 World Cup qualification	Kuwait	2–3	United Arab Emirates	Kuwait
--:-- UTC+3

22 June 2008 2010 World Cup qualification	Iran	2–0	Kuwait	Tehran, Iran
--:-- UTC+3:30				Stadium: Azadi Stadium

30 December 2008 Friendly	United Arab Emirates	0–0	Kuwait
--:-- UTC+3

=== 2009 ===
4 January 2009 2009 Gulf Cup	Oman	0–0	Kuwait	Muscat, Oman
--:-- UTC+4				Stadium: Sultan Qaboos Sports Complex

7 January 2009 2009 Gulf Cup	Bahrain	0–1	Kuwait	Muscat, Oman
--:-- UTC+4				Stadium: Sultan Qaboos Sports Complex

10 January 2009 2009 Gulf Cup	Iraq	1–1	Kuwait	Muscat, Oman
--:-- UTC+4				Stadium: Royal Oman Police Stadium

14 January 2009 2009 Gulf Cup	Saudi Arabia	1–0	Kuwait	Muscat, Oman
--:-- UTC+4				Stadium: Sultan Qaboos Sports Complex

20 January 2009 Friendly	Kuwait	2–0	Turkmenistan	Kuwait
--:-- UTC+3

23 January 2009 Friendly	Kuwait	2–3	Syria	Kuwait
--:-- UTC+3

28 January 2009 2011 Asian Cup qualification	Kuwait	0–1	Oman	Kuwait City, Kuwait
18:00 UTC+3				Stadium: Al-Sadaqua Walsalam Stadium; Attendance: 22,000

11 February 2009 Friendly	Kuwait	1–1	Azerbaijan	Kuwait
--:-- UTC+3

5 March 2009 2011 Asian Cup qualification	Australia	0–1	Kuwait	Canberra, Australia
20:00 UTC+11				Stadium: Canberra Stadium; Attendance: 20,032

17 March 2009 Friendly	Qatar	1–0	Kuwait	Qatar
--:-- UTC+3

31 May 2009 Friendly	Kuwait	0–1	Vietnam	Kuwait
--:-- UTC+3

5 October 2009 Friendly	Kuwait	1–1	Libya	Kuwait
--:-- UTC+3

10 October 2009 Friendly	Kuwait	2–1	Jordan	Kuwait
--:-- UTC+3

26 October 2009 Friendly	Kuwait	1–0	Syria	Kuwait
--:-- UTC+3

3 November 2009 Friendly	Kuwait	5–0	Kenya	Kuwait
--:-- UTC+3

8 November 2009 Friendly	Kuwait	2–2	China	Kuwait
--:-- UTC+3

14 November 2009 2011 Asian Cup qualification	Kuwait	2–1	Indonesia	Kuwait City, Kuwait
18:30 UTC+3				Stadium: Al Kuwait Sports Club Stadium

18 November 2009 2011 Asian Cup qualification	Indonesia	1–1	Kuwait	Jakarta, Indonesia
18:30 UTC+7				Stadium: Gelora Bung Karno Stadium

16 December 2009 Friendly	Kuwait	0–0	United Arab Emirates	Kuwait
--:-- UTC+3
