= 2026–27 Dhaka Wanderers Club season =

Dhaka Wanderers Club 2026–27 football season

Dhaka Wanderers Club
2026–27 season
- President: Mohammad Abdus Salam
- Stadium: Shaheed Barkat Stadium
- Bangladesh Football League: TBD
- Federation Cup: TBD

The 2026–27 season is Dhaka Wanderers Club's 89th season in existence and 2nd season in the Bangladesh Football League. It also marks the club's return to top-flight football following their relegation from the 2005 Dhaka Premier Division League. In addition to the domestic league, Wanderers is participating in this season's edition of the Federation Cup. The season covered the period from 1 June 2024 to 31 May 2025.

== Current squad ==
As of 22 February 2026

Note: Flags indicate national team as defined under FIFA eligibility rules; some limited exceptions apply. Players may hold more than one non-FIFA nationality.

No.	Pos.	Nation	Player
1	GK	BAN	Md Saiful Islam Khan
2	DF	BAN	Md Ganto
3	DF	BAN	Saddam Hossain Anny
4	DF	BAN	Mohammad Emon (captain)
5	DF	BAN	Md Tarek
6	DF	BAN	Md Rifat Hasan Sarthok
7	MF	BAN	Md Mahadud Hossain Fahim
8	MF	BAN	Md Sohel Rana
9	FW	BAN	Md Rajib
10	FW	BAN	Md Abdul Halim
11	FW	BAN	Imran Hossain
13	MF	BAN	Razuan Kabir
14	MF	BAN	Md Saiful Islam
15	MF	BAN	Md Hridoy Hossain
16	MF	BAN	Md Sajib Hossain
17	MF	BAN	Emon Mia
18	MF	BAN	Mehedi Hasan Polash

No.	Pos.	Nation	Player
19	FW	BAN	Md Saiful Islam
20	FW	BAN	Md Akash Shaikh
21	DF	BAN	Md Shahin
22	GK	BAN	Md Jasim Uddin
23	DF	BAN	Md Habibur Rahman
24	DF	BAN	Md Apon Sarkar
25	FW	BAN	Mehedi Hasan Redoy
26	FW	BAN	Akash Ahmed
27	MF	BAN	Md Jamim Hossain
28	MF	BAN	Shakib Biswas
29	DF	BAN	Md Rashed Hossain Biplob
30	GK	BAN	Raj Chowdhury
31	FW	BAN	Mahadi Hasan Reyad
32	FW	BAN	Md Sujon Biswas
33	GK	BAN	Md Tushar Abdullah Shahed
34	FW	BAN	Md Saifullah
35	DF	BAN	Abdul Nur Alam Nur

== Transfer ==
=== In ===
Pos	Player	Previous club	Fee	Date	Source
LB	(Bangladesh) Shuvo Ghosh	(Bangladesh) NoFeL SC	Free agent	17 August 2026	
MF	(Australia) Angus Bailey	(Australia) Gungahlin United FC	Unattached	27 August 2026	
GK	(Nepal) Sourav Bikram Karki	(Bhutan) Thimphu FC	Unattached	22 August 2026	
MF	(Nepal) Yubraj Dhakal	(Nepal) FC Khumaltar	Unattached	10 August 2026	
DF	(Cameroon) Obono Biloa Manuel Mario	(Cameroon) Club Symens Olympique	Unattached	13 August 2026	
FW	(Indonesia) Usman Diarra	(Indonesia) Sriwijaya F.C.	Unattached	22 August 2026	

=== Out ===
Pos	Player	To	Fee	Date	Source

== Overall ==
Win Draw Loss Fixtures

Competition	First match	Last match	Final Position
BFL	September 2026	April 2027	
Federation Cup	October 2026	April 2027	

=== Overview ===
Competition	Record							
Competition	Pld	W	D	L	GF	GA	GD	Win %
BFL	0	0	0	0	0	0	+0	—
Federation Cup	0	0	0	0	0	0	+0	—
Total	0	0	0	0	0	0	+0	—

Last updated: September 2026
Source: Competitions

=== Premier League ===
==== League table ====
Pos	Team	Pld	W	D	L	GF	GA	GD	Pts
6	City Club	0	0	0	0	0	0	0	0
7	Dhaka Abahani	0	0	0	0	0	0	0	0
8	Dhaka Wanderers	0	0	0	0	0	0	0	0
9	Fortis	0	0	0	0	0	0	0	0
10	Fakirerpool	0	0	0	0	0	0	0	0

Source: Soccerway
Rules for classification: 1) Points; 2) Goal difference; 3) Number of goals scored.

==== Results summary ====
Overall								Home						Away					
Pld	W	D	L	GF	GA	GD	Pts	W	D	L	GF	GA	GD	W	D	L	GF	GA	GD
0	0	0	0	0	0	0	0	0	0	0	0	0	0	0	0	0	0	0	0

Source: Soccerway

==== Results by round ====
Round	1	2	3	4	5	6	7	8	9	10	11	12	13	14	15	16	17	18
Ground																		
Result																		
Position																		

Source: Matches
A = Away; H = Home; W = Win; D = Draw; L = Loss; P = Postponed

==== Matches ====
2026	v
BST (UTC+6)

2026	v
BST (UTC+6)

2026	v
BST (UTC+6)

2026	v
BST (UTC+6)

2026	v
BST (UTC+6)

== Statistics ==
=== Goalscorers ===
As of August 2026

Rank	Player	Position	Total	BPL	Federation
1	TBC	TBC	0	0	0
Total			0	0	0
