= 2026–27 AFC Challenge League knockout stage =

The 2026–27 AFC Challenge League knockout stage began on 3 March 2027 with the quarter-finals, and ended on 8 May 2027 with the final being hosted by the East region finalist. A total of eight teams competed in the knockout stage to decide the champions of the 2026–27 AFC Challenge League.

== Qualified teams ==
The following teams advanced from the group stage:

- The winners of the groups and the best runner-up in the West Region (Groups A–C).
- The winners and runner-ups of each group in the East Region (Groups D–E).

Region	Group	Winners	Runners-up
West Region	A	(Lebanon) Al-Ansar	(Syria) Al-Ittihad Ahli
West Region	B	(Syria) Homs Al-Fidaa	—N/a
West Region	C	(Kuwait) Al-Qadsia	—N/a
East Region	D	(Indonesia) Borneo	(Chinese Taipei) Tainan City
East Region	E	(Philippines) Manila Digger	(Myanmar) Shan United

== Format ==
In the knockout stage, the eight teams will play a single-elimination tournament. Each tie will be played on a home-and-away two-legged basis, except the final which is played as a single match. Extra time and penalty shoot-out will be used to decide the winners if necessary. (Regulations Article 10).

Round	Matchups
Quarter-finals	East Region (Matchups and order of legs determined by identity of best runners-up: first team listed host first leg, second team listed host second leg): QF1: Group E runners-up vs. Group D winners; QF2: Group D runners-up vs. Group E winners; West Region (First team listed host first leg, second team listed host second leg): If best runners-up from Group A; QF3: Group A runners-up vs. Group B winners; QF4: Group C winners vs. Group A winners; If best runners-up from Group B; QF3: Group B runners-up vs. Group C winners; QF4: Group A winners vs. Group B winners; If best runners-up from Group C; QF3: Group C runners-up vs. Group A winners; QF4: Group B winners vs. Group C winners
Semi-finals	(First team listed host first leg, second team listed host second leg) East Region: SF1: Winners of QF1 vs. Winners of QF2; West Region: SF2: Winners of QF3 vs. Winners of QF4
Final	(Winners of East Region semi-finals host match): Winners of SF1 vs. Winners of SF2

== Schedule ==
The schedule of each round is as follows.

Schedule for 2026–27 AFC Challenge League
Stage	Round	West region	East region
Knockout stage	Quarter-finals	3 and 17 March 2027	11 and 18 March 2027
Knockout stage	Semi-finals	7 and 14 April 2027	8 and 15 April 2027
Knockout stage	Final	8 May 2027	

== Bracket ==
Quarter-finals
(Myanmar) Shan United
(Indonesia) Borneo
East Region
(Chinese Taipei) Tainan City
(Philippines) Manila Digger
(Syria) Al-Ittihad Ahli
(Syria) Homs Al-Fidaa
West Region
(Lebanon) Al-Ansar
(Kuwait) Al-Qadsia

Semi-finals
(Syria)

Final

== Quarter-finals ==
=== Summary ===
The West Region quarter-finals were scheduled to be played on 3 March, with the second legs on 17 March. While the first legs for the East Region were scheduled to be played on 11 March, with the second legs on 18 March.

Team 1	Agg.	Team 2	1st leg	2nd leg
East Region
Shan United (Myanmar)	–	(Indonesia) Borneo	11 Mar	18 Mar
Tainan City (Chinese Taipei)	–	(Philippines) Manila Digger	11 Mar	18 Mar
West Region
Al-Ittihad Ahli (Syria)	–	(Syria) Homs Al-Fidaa	3 Mar	17 Mar
Al-Ansar (Lebanon)	–	(Kuwait) Al-Qadsia	3 Mar	17 Mar

=== East Region ===
11 March 2027
--:-- UTC+6:30

Shan United (Myanmar)	v	(Indonesia) Borneo

Thuwunna Stadium, Yangon
18 March 2027
--:-- UTC+8

Borneo (Indonesia)	v	(Myanmar) Shan United

Segiri Stadium, Samarinda

11 March 2027
--:-- UTC+8

Tainan City (Chinese Taipei)	v	(Philippines) Manila Digger

Kaohsiung Nanzih Stadium, Kaohsiung
18 March 2027
--:-- UTC+8

Manila Digger (Philippines)	v	(Chinese Taipei) Tainan City

Rizal Memorial Stadium, Manila

=== West Region ===
3 March 2027
--:--

Al-Ittihad Ahli (Syria)	v	(Syria) Homs Al-Fidaa

17 March 2027
--:--

Homs Al-Fidaa (Syria)	v	(Syria) Al-Ittihad Ahli

3 March 2027
--:--

Al-Ansar (Lebanon)	v	(Kuwait) Al-Qadsia

17 March 2027
--:-- UTC+3

Al-Qadsia (Kuwait)	v	(Lebanon) Al-Ansar

Mohammed Al-Hamad Stadium, Hawally

== Semi-finals ==
=== Summary ===
The first legs for the West Region will be played on 7 April, with the second legs on 14 April 2027. While the fixtures for the East Region will be played on 8 & 15 April.

Team 1	Agg.	Team 2	1st leg	2nd leg
West Region
Winners of QF1	–	Winners of QF2	8 Apr	15 Apr
East Region
Winners of QF3 (Syria)	–	Winners of QF4	7 Apr	14 Apr
