= Shuki Itofusa =

Bangladeshi footballer (born 2004)

Personal information
- Full name: Shuki Itofusa
- Date of birth: 31 March 2004 (age 22)
- Place of birth: Saitama, Japan
- Height: 1.78 m (5 ft 10 in)
- Position: Left winger

Team information
- Current team: Fortis
- Number: 38

Youth career
- Kashiwa Reysol Nagareyama
- 2019–2021: Japan Aviation High School

Senior career*
Years	Team	Apps	(Gls)
2021–2024	Tokyo 23		
2024–2026	Brew Saga	25	(5)
2026	→ Mitsubishi Nagasaki (loan)	5	(0)
2026	Savannakhet Zelos	0	(0)
2026–	Fortis	1	(0)

International career^{‡}
2026–	Bangladesh	5	(0)
- * Club domestic league appearances and goals as of 9 October 2026 ‡ National team caps and goals as of 14 November 2026

Shuki Itofusa (糸房 朱紀, Itofusa Shuki; born 31 March 2004) is a professional footballer who plays as a left-winger for Bangladesh Football League club Fortis. Born in Japan, he plays for the Bangladesh national team.

== Early life ==
Itofusa was born in Saitama, Japan on 31 March 2004 to a Bangladeshi father from Narayanganj, and a Japanese mother. At the age of eight, he attended a Japanese school in the Bashundhara residential area of Dhaka for one year. He later continued his education at a vocational school in Tokyo, where he studied sports science and the human body. He later played high school football while attending Japan Aviation High School in Kai, Yamanashi.

== Club career ==
=== Early career ===
Itofusa played Division 1 football in the Kantō Soccer League with Tokyo 23 before joining Brew Saga in the Kyushu Soccer League, where he remained for the following two seasons. In his first season, he scored three goals in 17 league appearances, while in his second season, he scored two goals in seven league appearances. In the 2026 season, he joined Mitsubishi HI Nagasaki SC on loan in the same division, making five appearances after playing just once for Brew Saga at the start of the season.

=== Savannakhet Zelos ===
His mid-season loan at Mitsubishi HI Nagasaki was cut short after he completed a permanent transfer to Lao League 1 club Savannakhet Zelos in June 2026.

=== Fortis ===
On 2 September 2026, Itofusa transferred to Bangladesh Football League club Fortis before the Lao League season began, citing his aspirations to represent the Bangladesh national team.

He scored his first goal for the club against Regar-TadAZ Tursunzoda in the 2026–27 AFC Challenge League.

== International career ==
Itofusa began the process of obtaining his Bangladeshi passport in mid-2026.

On 25 September 2026, Itofusa made his international debut for Bangladesh against Malaysia in the 2026 FIFA ASEAN Cup, appearing as a second-half substitute.

== Career statistics ==
=== Club ===
As of 23 October 2026

Appearances and goals by club, season and competition
Club	Season	League			Domestic		Other		Continental		Total	
Club	Season	Division	Apps	Goals	Apps	Goals	Apps	Goals	Apps	Goals	Apps	Goals
Brew Saga	2024	JRL (Kyushu)	17	3	–		–		–		17	3
Brew Saga	2025	JRL (Kyushu)	7	2	0	0	–		–		7	2
Brew Saga	2026	JRL (Kyushu)	1	0	0	0	–		–		1	0
Brew Saga	Total		25	5	0	0	0	0	0	0	25	5
Mitsubishi Nagasaki	2026	JRL (Kyushu)	5	0	–		–		–		5	0
Savannakhet Zelos	2026–27	Lao League 1	0	0	–		–		–		0	0
Fortis	2026–27	BFL	1	0	0	0	–		2 (Note: Appearance(s) in AFC Challenge League)	1	3	1
Career total			31	5	0	0	0	0	2	1	33	6

=== International ===
As of 14 November 2026

Appearances and goals by national team and year
National team	Year	Apps	Goals
Bangladesh
Bangladesh	2026	5	0
Total		5	0
