= Pa Omar Babou =

Gambian footballer

Personal information
- Date of birth: 1 October 1998 (age 28)
- Place of birth: Banjul, The Gambia
- Height: 1.73 m (5 ft 8 in)
- Position: Forward

Team information
- Current team: Fortis
- Number: 10

Youth career
- Banjul United
- –2017: Hapoel Ramat HaSharon

Senior career*
Years	Team	Apps	(Gls)
2017–2020	Superstars Academy		
2017–2018	→ Hajduk Split II (loan)	3	(1)
2018	→ Dila (loan)	5	(0)
2019–2020	→ Ramat HaSharon (loan)	27	(6)
2020	→ Lommel (loan)	4	(1)
2021–2022	Chabab Mohammédia	6	(0)
2022–	Fortis	53	(29)

International career
2018	Gambia U23	1	(0)
- * Club domestic league appearances and goals as of 24 May 2026

Pa Omar Babou (born 1 October 1998) is a Gambian professional footballer who plays as a forward for Bangladesh Football League club Fortis.

== Club career ==
In August 2017, Babou joined Croatian club Hajduk Split and was assigned to its reserve team, Hajduk Split II. Before joining Hajduk, he had played for the youth team of Israeli club Hapoel Nir Ramat HaSharon, scoring 21 goals in 27 appearances during the 2016–17 season.

In 2018, Babou joined Georgian club Dila Gori on loan from Hajduk Split. He returned to Ramat HaSharon in early 2019 and played for its senior team in the Liga Leumit.

In January 2020, he moved to Belgian club Lommel on loan. He scored his first goal for the club against Royale Union Saint-Gilloise.

In September 2021, Babou joined Moroccan club Chabab Mohammédia. He made six appearances in the Botola during the 2021–22 season.

Babou joined Bangladeshi club Fortis when he was 23. In 2026, Babou assisted as Fortis reached the group stage of the 2026–27 AFC Challenge League.

== Career statistics ==
=== Club ===
As of 15 January 2020.

Club	Season	League			Cup		Continental		Other		Total	
Club	Season	Division	Apps	Goals	Apps	Goals	Apps	Goals	Apps	Goals	Apps	Goals
Hajduk Split II (loan)	2017–18	2. HNL	3	1	–		–		0	0	3	1
Dila (loan)	2018	Erovnuli Liga	5	0	0	0	0	0	0	0	5	0
Hapoel Ramat HaSharon (loan)	2018–19	Liga Leumit	10	3	0	0	0	0	0	0	10	0
Hapoel Ramat HaSharon (loan)	2019–20	Liga Leumit	17	3	1 (Note: Appearances in the Israel State Cup)	0	0	0	0	0	18	3
Lommel (loan)	2019–20	Proximus League	4	1	0	0	0	0	0	0	4	1
SCC Mohammédia	2021–22	Botola Pro	5	0	0	0	0	0	0	0	5	0
Career total			44	6	1	0	0	0	0	0	45	6
