= 2026–27 Bangladesh Football League =

19th professional season of the top-flight football league in Bangladesh

Bangladesh Football League
- Season: 2026–27
- Dates: 18 September 2026 – TBD 2027
- Country: Bangladesh
- Teams: 13
- Matches: 29
- Goals: 107 (3.69 per match)
- Top goalscorer: (The Gambia) Pa Omar Babou (Fortis FC) (5 goals)
- Biggest home win: Bangladesh Police FC 8–0 Fakirerpool YMC (10 October)
- Biggest away win: Brothers Union 0–6 Fortis FC (9 October)
- Highest scoring: 8 goals: Bangladesh Police FC 8–0 Fakirerpool YMC (10 October)
- Longest winning run: 4 matches: Dhaka Mohammedan
- Longest unbeaten run: 5 matches: Bangladesh Police
- Longest winless run: 5 matches: Chattogram City
- Longest losing run: 5 matches: Chattogram City
- All statistics correct as of 24 October 2026.

The 2026–27 Bangladesh Football League, is the 19th season of the country's top-tier Professional League since its establishment in 2007 and its second after being rebranded as the Bangladesh Football League.

Bashundhara Kings are the defending champions, having won a record–tying 6th title with Dhaka Abahani in the 2025–26 season.

== Teams ==
=== Stadiums and locations ===
Locations of the 2026–27 Bangladesh Football League teams
Location of the Dhaka division football club tents and stadiums

2026–27 Bangladesh Football League clubs
Team	Location	Stadium	Capacity
Dhaka Abahani	Dhaka (Dhanmondi)	Shaheed Dhirendranath Datta Stadium, Cumilla	18,000
Arambagh KS	Dhaka (Arambagh)	Gopalganj Old Stadium, Gopalganj	5,000
Bangladesh Police	Dhaka (Malibagh)	Shaheed Barkat Stadium, Gazipur	5,000
Bashundhara Kings	Dhaka (Bashundhara)	Bashundhara Kings Arena, Dhaka	6,000
Brothers Union	Dhaka (Gopibagh)	Gopalganj Old Stadium, Gopalganj	5,000
Chattogram City	Chattogram	Munshiganj Stadium, Munshiganj	10,000
City Club	Dhaka (Mirpur)	Shaheed Barkat Stadium, Gazipur	5,000
Dhaka Wanderers	Dhaka, (Motijheel)	Chandpur Stadium, Chandpur	10,000
Fortis	Dhaka (Badda)	Bashundhara Kings Arena, Dhaka	6,000
Fakirerpool YMC	Dhaka (Fakirerpool)	Chandpur Stadium, Chandpur	10,000
Mohammedan SC	Dhaka (Motijheel)	Shaheed Dhirendranath Datta Stadium, Cumilla	18,000
PWD Sports Club	Dhaka (Segunbagicha)	Shaheed Miraj–Tapan Stadium, Manikganj	5,000
Rahmatganj MFS	Dhaka (Chowkbazar)	Munshiganj Stadium, Munshiganj	10,000

=== Promotion/Relegation ===
▲ Promoted from 2025–26 BCL	▼ Relegated from 2025–26 BPL
Chattogram City; City Club; Dhaka Wanderers	None

=== Personnel, kits, sponsors ===
Team	Head coach	Captain	Kit manufacturer	Shirt sponsor (chest)
Dhaka Abahani	(Bangladesh) Maruful Haque	(Bangladesh) Assaduzzaman Bablu	In-House	
Arambagh KS	(Bangladesh) SM Zakaria	(Bangladesh) Md Rokey	In-House	Cute Cosmetics
Bangladesh Police	(Bangladesh) S. M. Asifuzzaman	(Bangladesh) M. S. Bablu	In-House	
Bashundhara Kings	(Bangladesh) Bayazid Alam Zubair Nipu	(Bangladesh) Topu Barman	In-House	Pocket
Brothers Union	(The Gambia) Omar Sise	(Bangladesh) Jamal Bhuyan	2WO Playwear	
Chattogram City	(Bangladesh) Eleta Kingsley	(Bangladesh) Mehedi Hasan Mithu	NU Sports	
City Club	(Bangladesh) Abdul Kayum Santu	(The Gambia) Solomon King Kanform	In-House	
Dhaka Wanderers	(Nepal) Prajwal Pratap Chetri	(Australia) Angus Bailey	In-House	Laser Treat
Fortis	(Bangladesh) Masud Parvez Kaiser	(The Gambia) Pa Omar Babou	TORR	
Fakirerpool	(Bangladesh) Sawpan Kumar Das	(Bangladesh) Raficul Islam	R CUBE Ltd.	Power-Plus Engineering Ltd.
Mohammedan	(Argentina) (Spain) Fernando Santiago Varela	(Uzbekistan) Muzaffar Muzaffarov	Wings	Meghna Group
PWD	(Bangladesh) Md. Anawer Hossain	(Bangladesh) Md Ratul	In-House	
Rahmatganj	(Bangladesh) Kamal Babu	(Bangladesh) Mamun Alif	In-House	

=== Coaching changes ===
Team	Outgoing Coach	Manner of departure	Date of vacancy	Position in the table	Incoming Coach	Date of appointment
Brothers Union	(Bangladesh) K.M. Zabid Hossain	Demoted to assistant	23 May 2026	Pre-season	(The Gambia) Omar Sisse	1 July 2026
Chattogram City	(Chile) Julio Moreno Rayneld-Franco	Mutual Consent	2 November 2026	12th	(Bangladesh) Eleta Kingsley	November 2026
Dhaka Wanderers	(Bangladesh) Asaduzzaman Asad	Mutual Consent	24 October 2026	13th	(Nepal) Prajwal Pratip Chetri	20 November 2026

== Foreign Players ==
Teams can register up to four foreign players, with only three permitted on the field at a time. Up to three players from South Asian Football Federation member countries may also be registered and will count as local players.

Team	Player 1	Player 2	Player 3	Player 4	Left Mid Season
Dhaka Abahani	(Nigeria) Anthony Okachi	(Nigeria) Chinedu Matthew	(Nigeria) Michael Babatunde	(Nigeria) Sunday Afolabi	
Dhaka Abahani	SAFF Player 1	SAFF Player 2	SAFF Player 3	(Nigeria) Sunday Afolabi	
Dhaka Abahani	(Pakistan) Moin Ahmed			(Nigeria) Sunday Afolabi	
Arambagh KS	(Ghana) Samuel Osei	(Ghana) Suleman Mohammed	(Ghana) Suraj Rayies	(Nigeria) Akanbi Musa	
Arambagh KS	SAFF Player 1	SAFF Player 2	SAFF Player 3	(Nigeria) Akanbi Musa	
Police FC	(Brazil) Marcelo Júnior	(Cameroon) Junior Ngong Sam	(Senegal) Rassoul Ba	(Uganda) Shafiq Kagimu	
Police FC	SAFF Player 1	SAFF Player 2	SAFF Player 3	(Uganda) Shafiq Kagimu	
Bashundhara Kings	(Brazil) Caíque	(Brazil) Robinho	(Nigeria) Emeka Ogbugh		
Bashundhara Kings	SAFF Player 1	SAFF Player 2	SAFF Player 3		
Bashundhara Kings	(Nepal) Anjan Bista	(Nepal) Manish Dangi	(Nepal) Rohit Chand		
Brothers Union	(Brazil) Jonathan Santana	(Brazil) Thiago Dunha Lima	(Ghana) Kossi Adetu	(England) William Oduwa	
Brothers Union	SAFF Player 1	SAFF Player 2	SAFF Player 3	(England) William Oduwa	
Brothers Union	(Nepal) Sakal Regmi	(Pakistan) Ali Uzair	(Pakistan) Syed Ali Raza	(England) William Oduwa	
Chattogram City	(Egypt) Mostafa Kahraba	(Ghana) Kofi Junior Dabanka	(Japan) Kenta Hara	(Nigeria) Raphael Onwrebe	
Chattogram City	SAFF Player 1	SAFF Player 2	SAFF Player 3	(Nigeria) Raphael Onwrebe	
Chattogram City	(Nepal) Aashish Sonam	(Nepal) Diwakar Chaudhary		(Nigeria) Raphael Onwrebe	
City Club	(The Gambia) Foday Darboe	(The Gambia) Solomon King Kanform	(Nigeria) Onyekachi Okafor		
City Club	SAFF Player 1	SAFF Player 2	SAFF Player 3		
City Club	(Nepal) Yogesh Gurung	(Pakistan) Shayak Dost			
Dhaka Wanderers	(Australia) Angus Bailey	(Cameroon) Obono Biloa	(Indonesia) Usman Diarra		
Dhaka Wanderers	SAFF Player 1	SAFF Player 2	SAFF Player 3		
Dhaka Wanderers	(Nepal) Saurav Bikram Karki	(Nepal) Yubraj Dhakal			
Fakirerpool	(Ivory Coast) Dosso Sidik	(Ivory Coast) Ouattara Ben Ibrahim	(The Gambia) Sulayman Sillah	(Mali) Fofana Abu Mohamed	
Fakirerpool	SAFF Player 1	SAFF Player 2	SAFF Player 3	(Mali) Fofana Abu Mohamed	
Fortis	(The Gambia) Essa Jallow	(The Gambia) Pa Omar Babou	(Nigeria) Stephen Chukwude	(Japan) Noriki Akada	
Fortis	SAFF Player 1	SAFF Player 2	SAFF Player 3	(Japan) Noriki Akada	
Fortis	(Nepal) Ananta Tamang	(Nepal) Arik Bista	(Sri Lanka) Sujan Perera	(Japan) Noriki Akada	
Mohammedan	(Mali) Souleymane Diabate	(Nigeria) Sunday Emmanuel	(Nigeria) Emmanuel Tony Agbaji	(Uzbekistan) Muzaffar Muzaffarov	
Mohammedan	SAFF Player 1	SAFF Player 2	SAFF Player 3	(Uzbekistan) Muzaffar Muzaffarov	
PWD SC	(Cameroon) Yohan Mbida	(Egypt) Kheled Reda Abobakr Ahmed Aly	(Germany) Flodyn Baloki		
PWD SC	SAFF Player 1	SAFF Player 2	SAFF Player 3		
PWD SC	(Nepal) Janmejay Dhami				
Rahmatganj MFS	(Ghana) Andrews Kwadwo Appau	(Ghana) Prince Owusu Ansah	(Senegal) Ibrahima Sene		
Rahmatganj MFS	SAFF Player 1	SAFF Player 2	SAFF Player 3		
Rahmatganj MFS	(Nepal) Abhishek Limbu	(Nepal) Kushal Deuba			

== League table ==
Pos	Team	Pld	W	D	L	GF	GA	GD	Pts	Qualification or relegation
1	Bangladesh Police	5	4	1	0	14	1	+13	13	Qualification for the AFC; Challenge League qualifying stage
2	Mohammedan	4	4	0	0	13	0	+13	12	
3	Bashundhara Kings	4	3	1	0	15	3	+12	10	
4	City Club	5	3	1	1	12	7	+5	10	
5	Fortis	3	2	1	0	15	3	+12	7	
6	Dhaka Abahani	4	2	1	1	9	4	+5	7	
7	Rahmatganj	5	1	3	1	8	8	0	6	
8	Brothers Union	5	1	2	2	5	13	−8	5	
9	PWD SC	5	0	3	2	2	5	−3	3	
10	Fakirerpool	4	1	0	3	4	13	−9	3	
11	Arambagh	5	0	3	2	4	14	−10	3	
12	Chattogram City	5	0	0	5	4	18	−14	0	Relegation for the Bangladesh Championship League
13	Dhaka Wanderers	4	0	0	4	2	18	−16	0	Relegation for the Bangladesh Championship League

Updated to match(es) played on 24 October 2026. Source: Soccerway
Rules for classification: 1) Points; 2) Goal difference; 3) Number of goals scored.

== Results ==
=== Results table ===
Home \ Away	AKS	BPFC	BDK	BUL	CCFC	CC	DAL	DWC	FYC	FFC	MSC	PWD	RMFS
Arambagh KS	—		1–1			0–4							2–2
Bangladesh Police	1–1	—							8–0				1–0
Bashundhara Kings			—			4–2		7–0					
Brothers Union				—		0–3	2–1			0–6			
Chattogram City		0–3			—								
City Club			0–3		2–1	—							
Dhaka Abahani					3–1		—				a		
Dhaka Wanderers							1–5	—					
Fakirerpool								2–1	—		0–1		2–3
Fortis					6–0	3–3				—			
Mohammedan	6–0						a	4–0			—		
PWD SC		0–1		1–1			0–0				0–2	—	
Rahmatganj				2–2								1–1	—

Updated to match(es) played on 24 October 2026. Source: Soccerway
Legend: Blue = home team win; Yellow = draw; Red = away team win.
For upcoming matches, an "a" indicates there is an article about the rivalry between the two participants.

=== Form ===
Team ╲ Round	1	2	3	4	5	6	7	8	9	10	11	12	13	14	15	16	17	18	19	20	21	22	23	24
Arambagh KS	D	D	L	D	L																			
Bangladesh Police	W	W	W	D	W																			
Bashundhara Kings	D	x	W	W	W																			
Brothers Union	L	D	L	D	W																			
Chattogram City	L	L	L	L	L																			
City Club	W	D	W	L	W																			
Dhaka Abahani	D	W	x	W	L																			
Dhaka Wanderers	L	L	L	x	L																			
Fakirerpool	W	L	L	22 Jan 27	L																			
Fortis	W	D	W	22 Jan 27	x																			
Mohammedan	x	W	W	W	W																			
PWD SC	D	D	D	L	L																			
Rahmatganj	L	D	D	D	W																			

Updated to match(es) played on 24 October 2026. Source: Soccerway
W = Win; D = Draw; L = Lose; × = No match scheduled in the round

=== Positions by round ===
The following table lists the positions of teams after each week of matches. In order to preserve the chronological evolution, any postponed matches are not included to the round at which they were originally scheduled but added to the full round they were played immediately afterward.

Team ╲ Round	1	2	3	4	5	6	7	8	9	10	11	12	13	14	15	16	17	18	19	20	21	22	23	24	25	26
Arambagh KS	5	7	10	9	11																					
Bangladesh Police	4	1	1	1	1																					
Bashundhara Kings	6	9	5	4	3																					
Brothers Union	12	11	11	11	8																					
Chattogram City	13	13	12	12	12																					
City Club	2	4	3	6	4																					
Dhaka Abahani	7	3	6	5	6																					
Dhaka Wanderers	10	12	13	13	13																					
Fakirerpool	3	6	8	10	10																					
Fortis	1	2	2	3	5																					
Mohammedan	9	5	4	2	2																					
PWD SC	8	8	7	8	9																					
Rahmatganj	11	10	9	7	7																					

Leader
Runners-up
Relegation to BCL

Updated to match(es) played on 24 October 2026. Source: Soccerway

== Season statistics ==
=== Goalscorers ===
There were 107 goals scored in 29 matches, for an average of 3.69 goals per match (as of 24 October 2026). Source: Soccerway

5 goals

- (The Gambia) Pa Omar Babou (Fortis)
- (Mali) Souleymane Diabate (Dhaka Mohammedan)
- (Nigeria) Onyekachi Okafor (City Club)

4 goals

- (The Gambia) Sulayman Sillah (Fakirerpool)

3 goals

- (Bangladesh) Enamul Islam Gazi (City Club)
- (Bangladesh) Md. Sabbir Hossen (Bashundhara Kings)
- (Bangladesh) Mohammad Ibrahim (Fortis)
- (Bangladesh) Rakib Hossain (Bashundhara Kings)
- (Japan) Noriki Akada (Fortis)
- (Nigeria) Anthony Okachi (Abahani)
- (Pakistan) Syed Ali Raza (Brothers Union)
- (Senegal) Ibrahima Sene (Rahmatganj)
- (Senegal) Rassoul Ba (Bangladesh Police FC)

2 goals

- Manik Hossain Molla (Bangladesh Police)
- (Bangladesh) Minhajul Abedin Ballu (Dhaka Mohammedan)
- (Bangladesh) Mohammed Al-Amin (Abahani)
- M S Bablu (Bangladesh Police)
- Rabby Hossen Rahul (Bangladesh Police)
- (Bangladesh) Rafiqul Islam (City Club)
- (Bangladesh) Rafayel Tudu (Fortis)
- (Bangladesh) Sazzad Hossain (Rahmatganj MFS)
- (Bangladesh) Shahriar Emon (Dhaka Mohammedan)
- (Brazil) Caíque (Bashundhara Kings)
- (Brazil) Robson Azevedo (Bashundhara Kings)
- (Cameroon) Junior Ngong Sam (Bangladesh Police)
- (Nepal) Abhishek Limbu (Rahmatganj MFS)
- (Nigeria) Michael Babatunde (Abahani)
- (Pakistan) Shayak Dost (City Club)

1 goals

- (Australia) Angus Bailey (Dhaka Wanderers)
- (Bangladesh) Arif Hossain (Dhaka Mohammedan)
- Arman Foysal Akash (Bangladesh Police)
- Hossain Mohammad Arian (Bangladesh Police)
- (Bangladesh) Insan Hossain (Fortis)
- (Bangladesh) Jafar Iqbal (Chattogram City FC)
- (Bangladesh) Jahid Hasan Shanto (Mohammedan SC)
- (Bangladesh) Jahid Hossen (Dhaka Wanderers)
- (Bangladesh) Jamal Bhuyan (Brothers Union)
- (Bangladesh) Md Rifat Kazi (Rahmatganj MFS)
- (Bangladesh) Md Rokey (Arambagh KS)
- (Bangladesh) Mohammad Abdullah (Bashundhara Kings)
- (Bangladesh) Mohammed Nazim Uddin (PWD SC)
- (Bangladesh) Rabiul Hasan (Abahani)
- (Bangladesh) Samin Yasar Juel (Arambagh KS)
- (Bangladesh) Samor Joy Tanchangya (Arambagh KS)
- (Bangladesh) Sourav Dewan (Dhaka Mohammedan)
- (Bangladesh) Quazem Shah (Bashundhara Kings)
- (Brazil) Jonathan Santana (Brothers Union)
- (Cameroon) Yohan Mbida (PWD SC)
- (Ghana) Suraj Rayies (Arambagh KS)
- (Japan) Kenta Hara (Chattogram City FC)
- (Nepal) Anjan Bista (Bashundhara Kings)
- (Nepal) Aashish Sonam (Chattogram City FC)
- (Nepal) Manish Dangi (Bashundhara Kings)
- (Nigeria) Emeka Ogbugh (Bashundhara Kings)
- (Nigeria) Raphael Onwrebe (Chattogram City FC)
- (Nigeria) Stephen Chukwude (Fortis)
- (Pakistan) Moin Ahmed (Abahani)
- (Uganda) Shafiq Kagimu (Bangladesh Police)
- (Uzbekistan) Muzaffar Muzaffarov (Dhaka Mohammedan)

=== Hat-tricks ===
† Bold Club indicates winner of the match.

Player	For	Against	Result	Home/Away	Date	Ref
(Nigeria) Onyekachi Okafor	City Club	Fortis FC	3–3	Away	3 October 2026	
(Bangladesh) Md. Sabbir Hossen	Bashundhara Kings	Dhaka Wanderers Club	7–0	Home	9 October 2026	
(Mali) Souleymane Diabate	Dhaka Mohammedan	Arambagh KS	6–0	Home	10 October 2026	
(Senegal) Rassoul Ba	Bangladesh Police FC	Fakirerpool YMC	8–0	Home	10 October 2026	

=== Most assists ===
As of 10 October 2026

Rank	Player	Team	Assists
1	(Bangladesh) Enamul Islam Gazi	City Club	6
2	(Bangladesh) Md Rabby Hossen Rahul	Bangladesh Police FC	4
2	(The Gambia) Pa Omar Babou	Fortis	4
3	(Brazil) Robson	Bashundhara Kings	3

=== Clean sheets ===
As of 19 September 2026

==== By goalkeepers ====
Rank	Player	Club	Matches	Cleansheets	Clean sheets %
1	(Bangladesh) Ishaque Ali	City Club	1	1	100.00
1	(Bangladesh) Mahfuz Hasan Pritom	Dhaka Abahani	1	1	100.00
1	(Bangladesh) Md Anik Ahamed	PWD SC	1	1	100.00
1	(Bangladesh) Md Asif	Bangladesh Police	1	1	100.00
1	(Sri Lanka) Sujan Perera	Fortis	1	1	100.00

==== By teams ====
Clubs	Matches	Clean sheets	Clean sheets %
Arambagh KS	1	0	0
Bashundhara Kings	1	0	0
Bangladesh Police	1	1	100.00
Brothers Union	1	0	0
Chattogram City	1	0	0
City Club	1	1	100.00
Dhaka Abahani	1	1	100.00
Dhaka Wanderers	1	0	0
Fakirerpool	1	0	0
Fortis	1	1	100.00
Mohammedan SC	0	0	–
PWD SC	1	1	100.00
Rahmatganj	1	0	0

=== Discipline ===
==== Players ====
- Most yellow cards: 1
  - Fourteen players
- Most red cards:

==== Teams ====
Clubs	Yellow cards	Red cards
Arambagh KS	2	0
Bashundhara Kings	1	0
Bangladesh Police	0	0
Brothers Union	1	0
Chattogram City	2	0
City Club	1	0
Dhaka Abahani	2	0
Dhaka Wanderers	0	0
Fakirerpool	2	0
Fortis	0	0
Mohammedan SC	0	0
PWD SC	3	0
Rahmatganj	0	0
Total	14	0

== See also ==
- 2026–27 Championship League
- 2026–27 Federation Cup
