= Kablan N'Goma =

French footballer (born 1995)

Personal information
- Full name: Kablan Davy N'Goma
- Date of birth: 13 October 1995 (age 31)
- Place of birth: Mantes-la-Jolie, France
- Height: 1.72 m (5 ft 8 in)
- Position: Right winger

Team information
- Current team: Borneo Samarinda
- Number: 53

Youth career
- 2013–2014: Amiens

Senior career*
| Years | Team | Apps | (Gls) |
| 2015 | Amiens | 1 | (0) |
| 2015–2016 | Amiens B | 14 | (1) |
| 2016–2017 | Épinal | 1 | (0) |
| 2017–2018 | Tarbes Pyrénées | 4 | (0) |
| 2018 | Bourges | 13 | (0) |
| 2018–2019 | Avoine | 8 | (0) |
| 2019–2021 | Canet Roussillon | 15 | (1) |
| 2021 | Blansko | 12 | (2) |
| 2022–2023 | Racing Union | 37 | (8) |
| 2023–2024 | Botoșani | 9 | (0) |
| 2024 | Hermannstadt | 5 | (0) |
| 2025 | Racing Union | 10 | (1) |
| 2025–2026 | Budaiya | | |
| 2026– | Borneo Samarinda | 3 | (0) |
- * Club domestic league appearances and goals as of 16 September 2026

Kablan Davy N'Goma (born 13 October 1995) is a French professional footballer who plays as a right-winger for Super League club Borneo Samarinda.

== Club career ==
Born in Mantes-la-Jolie, France, N'Goma, who is also of Congolese descent spent his early career in France at a young age with Amiens. N'Goma made his professional debut on 22 May 2015 as a substitute in a 3–3 draw over Red Star. After three years with Amiens, N'Goma decided to leave and join several French clubs, such as Épinal, Tarbes Pyrénées, Bourges, Avoine, and Canet Roussillon. While playing for Canet Roussillon, he also successfully led the team to promotion from the Championnat National 3 to the Championnat National 2.

In February 2021, he signed a contract with Czech National Football League club Blansko. N'Goma made his league debut for Blansko on 6 March 2021 as a starter in a 2–0 win against Třinec. On 11 April 2021, he scored his first league goal for Blansko, in a 3–1 away win against Viktoria Žižkov. N'Goma decided to terminate his contract in July 2021; he had made 12 appearances and scored 2 goals for Bransko. After six months without a club, N'Goma decided to move to Luxembourg and signed a contract with Racing Union. In his first season, 2021–22, he made 9 appearances and scored 1 goal. He also played for his team in the 2022–23 UEFA Europa Conference League qualifying. However, they were defeated by the Serbian club Čukarički., In the following season, N'Goma contributed to his team by making 28 appearances and scoring 7 goals.

In August 2023, Romanian club, Botoșani announced a deal for N'Goma. He made his league debut on 5 September 2023 as a starter in a 2–2 draw over Hermannstadt.

In January 2024, he signed with Hermannstadt. After leaving Hermannstadt, N'Goma was once again without a club. He subsequently rejoined Racing Union in January 2025. Throughout the 2024–25 season, N'Goma made 21 appearances for the team across all competitions. He recorded one goal and two assists, as well as two goals and one assist in the 2024–25 Luxembourg Cup. In the following season, he move to Bahrain with joined Budaiya of the Bahraini Premier League. On 19 July 2026, Indonesian club, Borneo Samarinda announced a deal for N'Goma on a free transfer. He made his league debut for Borneo on 5 September 2026, coming on as a starter in a 0–1 lose against Persija Jakarta at the Segiri Stadium.
