= 2026–27 AFC Challenge League =

Asian association football tournament

Tournament details
- Dates: Qualifying: 11 August – 8 September 2026; Competition proper: 17 October 2026 – 8 May 2027
- Teams: Competition proper: 20; Total: 29 (from 18 or 19 associations)

Tournament statistics
- Matches played: 27
- Goals scored: 77 (2.85 per match)

The 2026–27 AFC Challenge League is the 13th edition of the Asia's third-tier continental club football competition, organized by the Asian Football Confederation (AFC), and the third under the AFC Challenge League title.

Al-Kuwait are the reigning champions, but did not defend their title as the Challenge League winners automatically qualified for the Champions League Two group stage. The winners will automatically qualify for the 2027–28 AFC Champions League Two group stage, while the runners-up will qualify for the preliminary stage.

== Association team allocation ==
The associations are allocated slots according to their club competitions ranking which was published after the 2024–25 competitions were completed.

Participation for 2026–27 AFC Challenge League
Participating
Not participating

West Region (3 groups)
Rank		Member association	Points	Slots	
Rank		Member association	Points	Group stage	Preliminary stage
Zone	AFC	Member association	Points	Group stage	Preliminary stage
10	18	India	24.958	0 (+1 ACL2)	0
11	20	Turkmenistan	24.211	1	0
12	21	Kuwait	21.260	1 (+1 ACL2)	0
13	22	Lebanon	20.304	2	0
14	24	Tajikistan	20.033	1	1
15	26	Kyrgyzstan	18.378	0	2
16	28	Bangladesh	16.428	0	2
17	29	Syria	14.174	0	2
18	33	Maldives	9.910	0	1
19	35	Palestine	6.198	0	0
20	36	Bhutan	4.035	0	1
21	39	Nepal	1.300	0	0
22	40	Afghanistan	0.560	0	1
23	41	Sri Lanka	0.480	0	0
24	43	Yemen	0.000	0	0
24	43	Pakistan	0.000	0	0
Total		Participating associations: 10 or 11		7	10
Total		Participating associations: 10 or 11		17	

East Region (2 groups)
Rank		Member association	Points	Slots	
Rank		Member association	Points	Group stage	Preliminary stage
Zone	AFC	Member association	Points	Group stage	Preliminary stage
11	25	Indonesia	18.653	1	0
12	27	Philippines	16.706	1 (+1 ACL2)	0
13	30	Myanmar	12.837	1	1
14	31	Chinese Taipei	12.280	0	2
15	32	North Korea	11.730	0	0
16	34	Mongolia	6.962	0	2
17	37	Macau	3.233	0	0
18	38	Laos	2.375	0	1
19	42	Brunei	0.090	0	1
20	43	Timor-Leste	0.000	0	1
20	43	Guam	0.000	0	0
20	43	Northern Mariana Islands	0.000	0	0
Total		Participating associations: 8		4	8
Total		Participating associations: 8		12	

Notes

1. AFC licensing (AFC1): Association did not have a licensed team.
2. AFC slots (AFC2): The indirect slot received a bye in the play-off round due to an insufficient number of participating teams.
3. AFC slots reallocation (AFC3): The indirect slot of the member associations that did not enter a team was redistributed to the next highest eligible member association. However, for the East Region, the fourth slot – which was to be reallocated to either Laos, Brunei or Timor-Leste – had to be forfeited, since these member associations had only one licensed team.

== Teams ==
Entry round	West Region			East Region		
Group stage	Team	Qualifying method	App. (last)	Team	Qualifying method	App. (last)
Group stage	(Kuwait) Al-Arabi	2026–27 AFC Champions League Two preliminary stage losers	3rd (2025–26)	(Philippines) Manila Digger	2026–27 AFC Champions League Two preliminary stage losers	2nd (2025–26)
Group stage	(India) Goa	2026–27 AFC Champions League Two preliminary stage losers	1st	(Philippines) Manila Digger	2026–27 AFC Champions League Two preliminary stage losers	2nd (2025–26)
Group stage	(Turkmenistan) Ahal	2025 Ýokary Liga runners-up	1st	(Indonesia) Borneo Samarinda	2025–26 Indonesia Super League runners-up	1st
Group stage	(Kuwait) Al-Qadsia	2025–26 Kuwaiti Premier League third place	1st	(Philippines) ~~One Taguig~~	2025–26 Philippines Football League runners-up	1st
Group stage	(Lebanon) Al-Ansar	2025–26 Lebanese Premier League champions	2nd (2025–26)	(Myanmar) Shan United	2025–26 Myanmar National League champions	5th (2025–26)
Group stage	(Lebanon) Nejmeh	2025–26 Lebanese Premier League runners-up	2nd (2024–25)			
Group stage	(Tajikistan) Istiklol	2025 Tajikistan Higher League champions	2nd (2011)			
Preliminary stage	(Tajikistan) Regar-TadAZ	2025 Tajikistan Cup winners	6th (2025–26)	(Myanmar) Yangon United	2025–26 Myanmar National League runner-up	2nd (2025–26)
Preliminary stage	(Kyrgyzstan) Dordoi Bishkek	2025 Kyrgyzstan Cup winners	9th (2013)	(Chinese Taipei) Tainan City	2025–26 Taiwan Football Premier League champions	3rd (2025–26)
Preliminary stage	(Kyrgyzstan) Muras United	2025 Kyrgyz Premier League runners-up	2nd (2025–26)	(Chinese Taipei) Hang Yuan	2025–26 Taiwan Football Premier League runners-up	1st
Preliminary stage	(Bangladesh) Fortis	2025–26 Bangladesh Football League 3rd place	1st	(Mongolia) Ulaanbaatar	2025–26 Mongolian Premier League champions	1st
Preliminary stage	Bangladesh Police	2025–26 Bangladesh Football League 4th place	1st	(Mongolia) Central Stallions	2025–26 Mongolian Premier League runners-up	1st
Preliminary stage	(Syria) Al-Ittihad Ahli	2025–26 Syrian Premier League champions	1st	(Laos) Ezra	2025–26 Lao League 1 champions	2nd (2025–26)
Preliminary stage	(Syria) Homs Al-Fidaa	2025–26 Syrian Premier League runners-up	1st	(Brunei) Kasuka	2025–26 Brunei Super League runners-up	2nd (2025–26)
Preliminary stage	(Maldives) Maziya	2025–26 Dhivehi Premier League champions	3rd (2025–26)	(Timor-Leste) Karketu Dili	2025 Liga Futebol Timor-Leste champions	1st
Preliminary stage	(Bhutan) Paro	2025 Bhutan Premier League champions	3rd (2025–26)			
Preliminary stage	(Afghanistan) Abu Muslim	2025–26 Afghanistan Champions League champions	2nd (2025–26)			

Notes

1. Bangladesh (BAN): 2025–26 Bangladesh Football League champions Bashundhara Kings and runners-up Dhaka Abahani did not qualify due to the AFC ban. Therefore, the reserved spot transferred to the BFL third-placed team, Fortis and forth-placed team, Bangladesh Police.
2. Brunei (BRU): As 2025–26 Brunei Super League champion Indera SC, failed to obtain the AFC license, the spot reserved for the champion was transferred to the runners-up team.
3. Philippines (PHI): One Taguig subsequently withdrawn, after their club licence was withdrawn by the PFF due to outstanding player and staff remuneration.
4. Kuwait (KUW): As Al-Kuwait won the 2025–26 Kuwaiti Premier League and qualified to 2026-27 AFC Champions League Two group stage as the 2025–26 AFC Challenge League champions, the spot reserved for the runners-up was transferred to the third-placed team.
5. Syria (SYR): Since the 2025–26 Syrian Cup could not take place due to scheduling constraints, the AFC Challenge League playoff spots were awarded based on the Premier League standings.
6. Turkmenistan (TKM): As 2025 Turkmenistan Cup winners Arkadag qualified for the Champions League Two via their league position, the spot reserved for the Turkmenistan Cup winners was transferred to the runners-up of the 2025 Ýokary Liga.
7. BYE: Received a bye to the group stage in accordance with the relevant competition regulations.

== Schedule ==
The schedule of the competition is as follows.

Schedule for 2026–27 AFC Challenge League
Stage	Round	Draw date	West region	East region
Preliminary stage		No draw (Note: Pre-determined format)	11–12 August 2026	11 August, 8 and 15 September 2026
Group stage	Matchday 1	20 August 2026	17 October 2026	18 October 2026
Group stage	Matchday 2	20 August 2026	20 October 2026	21 October 2026
Group stage	Matchday 3	20 August 2026	23 October 2026	24 October 2026
Knockout stage	Quarter-finals	TBD	3 and 17 March 2027	11 and 18 March 2027
Knockout stage	Semi-finals	TBD	7 and 14 April 2027	8 and 15 April 2027
Knockout stage	Final	TBD	8 May 2027	

== Preliminary stage ==
The bracket of the preliminary stage was determined based on each team's seeding, with the higher seeded hosting the match. Teams from the same association could not be placed into the same tie. The winners of the preliminary stage (five from West and four from East) advanced to the group stage of the competition.

Team 1	Score	Team 2
West Region
Dordoi Bishkek (Kyrgyzstan)	1–1 (7–8 p)	(Syria) Homs Al-Fidaa
Fortis (Bangladesh)	1–0	(Kyrgyzstan) Muras United
Al-Ittihad Ahli (Syria)	1–0	Bangladesh Police
Paro (Bhutan)	2–0	(Afghanistan) Abu Muslim
Maziya (Maldives)	0–3	(Tajikistan) Regar-TadAZ
East Region
Central Stallions (Mongolia)	2–2 (3–5 p)	(Chinese Taipei) Tainan City
FC Ulaanbaatar (Mongolia)	1–2	(Chinese Taipei) Hang Yuan
Yangon United (Myanmar)	2–1	(Laos) Ezra
Kasuka (Brunei)	2–1	(Timor-Leste) Karketu Dili

=== West Region ===
11 August 2026
20:00 UTC+6

Dordoi Bishkek (Kyrgyzstan)	1–1 (a.e.t.)	(Syria) Homs Al-Fidaa
Hamed 84'	AFC report GSA report	Khatab 10'
Penalties
Mishchenko (penalty scored); Batyrkanov (penalty scored); Marchuk (penalty scored); Karvatskyi (penalty scored); Kuanov (penalty scored); Kobylyanskyi (penalty scored); Pukhtyeyev (penalty scored); Abilov (penalty missed)	7–8	(penalty scored) Mhanna; (penalty scored) Shoufan; (penalty scored) Hmeisha; (penalty scored) Mardikian; (penalty scored) Mashlab; (penalty scored) Othman; (penalty scored) Al Bitar; (penalty scored) Asaad

Dolen Omurzakov Stadium, Bishkek
Attendance: 4,934
Referee: Mahmoud Al-Sawalmeh (Jordan)

11 August 2026
15:00 UTC+6

Fortis (Bangladesh)	1–0	(Kyrgyzstan) Muras United
Ibrahim 52'	AFC report GSA report

Bashundhara Kings Arena, Dhaka
Attendance: 2,113
Referee: Husain Al Showaikh (Bahrain)

11 August 2026
20:00 UTC+3

Al-Ittihad Ahli (Syria)	1–0	Bangladesh Police
Rodrigues 44'	AFC report GSA report

King Abdullah II Stadium, Amman (Jordan)
Attendance: 500
Referee: Amirjon Khorkashev (Tajikistan)

11 August 2026
18:00 UTC+6

Paro (Bhutan)	2–0	(Afghanistan) Abu Muslim
Mishima 18'; Baldeh 84'	AFC report GSA report

Changlimithang Stadium, Thimphu
Attendance: 3,800
Referee: Mohamed Jafran (Sri Lanka)

12 August 2026
15:00 UTC+5

Maziya (Maldives)	0–3	(Tajikistan) Regar-TadAZ
	AFC report GSA report	Pandzhiev 51'; Makhamadiev 89'; Safarov 90+2'

National Football Stadium, Malé
Attendance: 430
Referee: Sekaran Senthilnathan (India)

=== East Region ===
11 August 2026
11:00 UTC+8

Central Stallions (Mongolia)	2–2 (a.e.t.)	(Chinese Taipei) Tainan City
Baatar 73', 83'	AFC report GSA report	Porto 64'; Kim Sung-kyum 90+2'
Penalties
Fukuhara (penalty missed); Tsagaantsooj (penalty scored); Iuri (penalty scored); Saikhanbayar (penalty scored)	3–5	(penalty scored) Kim Sung-kyum; (penalty scored) Moreno; (penalty scored) Kuo Po-wei; (penalty scored) Kim Young-geun; (penalty scored) Wu Chun-ching

MFF Football Centre, Ulaanbaatar (Note: Match host swapped following mutual agreement.)
Attendance: 897
Referee: Izzul Fikri (Malaysia)

11 August 2026
16:00 UTC+8

FC Ulaanbaatar (Mongolia)	1–2	(Chinese Taipei) Hang Yuan
Amaraa 72'	AFC report GSA report	Wang Po-ying 13' (pen.); Kaneko 74'

MFF Football Centre, Ulaanbaatar
Attendance: 972
Referee: Torphong Somsing (Thailand)

8 September 2026
16:00 UTC+6:30

Yangon United (Myanmar)	2–1	(Laos) Ezra
Djidjiwa 62'; Than Paing 70'	AFC report GSA report	Phoutthavong 81' (pen.)

Thuwunna Stadium, Yangon
Attendance: 1,050
Referee: Suhail Abdulla Ali Al-Mulla (United Arab Emirates)

15 September 2026
20:15 UTC+8

Kasuka (Brunei)	2–1	(Timor-Leste) Karketu Dili
Kaique 13'; Kojo 35'	AFC report GSA report	Arthur 69'

Hassanal Bolkiah Stadium, Bandar Seri Begawan
Attendance: 672
Referee: Wael Haidar (Lebanon)

== Group stage ==
Location of the 2026–27 AFC Challenge League group stage teams
Brown: Group A; Green: Group B; Orange: Group C;
Yellow: Group D; Pink: Group E

=== West Region ===
==== Group A ====
Pos	Team	Pld	W	D	L	GF	GA	GD	Pts	Qualification	ANS	ITT	AHA	PAR
1	(Lebanon) Al-Ansar	3	2	0	1	5	3	+2	6 (Note: Head-to-head Points: Al-Ansar 3, Al-Ittihad 0.)	Quarter-finals		2–0	1–2	2–1
2	(Syria) Al-Ittihad Ahli	3	2	0	1	7	4	+3	6	Quarter-finals			5–1	2–1
3	(Turkmenistan) Ahal	3	1	1	1	5	8	−3	4					2–2
4	(Bhutan) Paro (H)	3	0	1	2	4	6	−2	1					

Source: AFC
Rules for classification: Group stage tiebreakers
(H) Hosts

==== Group B ====
Pos	Team	Pld	W	D	L	GF	GA	GD	Pts	Qualification	HFD	NEJ	IST	ARA
1	(Syria) Homs Al-Fidaa	3	3	0	0	5	1	+4	9	Quarter-finals		2–1	2–0	1–0
2	(Lebanon) Nejmeh	3	2	0	1	5	3	+2	6				1–0	3–1
3	(Tajikistan) Istiklol (H)	3	1	0	2	2	3	−1	3					2–0
4	(Kuwait) Al-Arabi	3	0	0	3	1	6	−5	0					

Source: AFC
Rules for classification: Group stage tiebreakers
(H) Hosts

==== Group C ====
Pos	Team	Pld	W	D	L	GF	GA	GD	Pts	Qualification	QAD	FOR	GOA	REG
1	(Kuwait) Al-Qadsia (H)	3	3	0	0	6	1	+5	9	Quarter-finals		3–0	2–1	1–0
2	(Bangladesh) Fortis	3	1	0	2	4	6	−2	3 (Note: Head-to-head goals scored: Fortis 1, Goa 0, Regar-TadAZ –1.)				1–2	3–1
3	(India) Goa	3	1	0	2	4	5	−1	3					1–2
4	(Tajikistan) Regar-TadAZ	3	1	0	2	3	5	−2	3					

Source: AFC
Rules for classification: Group stage tiebreakers
(H) Hosts

==== Ranking of second-placed teams ====
Pos	Grp	Team	Pld	W	D	L	GF	GA	GD	Pts	Qualification
1	A	(Syria) Al-Ittihad Ahli	3	2	0	1	7	4	+3	6	Quarter-finals
2	B	(Lebanon) Nejmeh	3	2	0	1	5	3	+2	6	
3	C	(Bangladesh) Fortis	3	1	0	2	4	6	−2	3	

Source: AFC
Rules for classification: 1) points; 2) goal difference; 3) number of goals scored; 4) fair play ranking; 5) drawing of lots

=== East Region ===
==== Group D ====
Pos	Team	Pld	W	D	L	GF	GA	GD	Pts	Qualification	BOR	TSG	YAN	TAG
1	(Indonesia) Borneo	2	2	0	0	5	1	+4	6	Quarter-finals		3–1	2–0	~~24 Oct~~
2	(Chinese Taipei) Tainan City	2	0	1	1	2	4	−2	1	Quarter-finals			1–1	~~18 Oct~~
3	(Myanmar) Yangon United	2	0	1	1	1	3	−2	1					~~21 Oct~~
4	(Philippines) One Taguig (W)	0	0	0	0	0	0	0	0	Withdrew (Note: One Taguig withdrew after the Philippine Football Federation revoked their club license due to outstanding player and staff remuneration.)				

Source: AFC
Rules for classification: Group stage tiebreakers
(W) Withdrawn

==== Group E ====
Pos	Team	Pld	W	D	L	GF	GA	GD	Pts	Qualification	MDF	SHU	KFC	NTH
1	(Philippines) Manila Digger	3	2	1	0	10	1	+9	7	Quarter-finals		4–0	5–0	1–1
2	(Myanmar) Shan United (H)	3	1	1	1	3	5	−2	4	Quarter-finals			0–2	1–1
3	(Brunei) Kasuka	3	1	0	2	2	8	−6	3					1–2
4	(Chinese Taipei) Hang Yuan	3	0	2	1	3	4	−1	2					

Source: AFC
Rules for classification: Group stage tiebreakers
(H) Hosts

== Knockout stage ==
=== Bracket ===
Quarter-finals
(Myanmar) Shan United
(Indonesia) Borneo
East Region
(Chinese Taipei) Tainan City
(Philippines) Manila Digger
(Syria) Al-Ittihad Ahli
(Syria) Homs Al-Fidaa
West Region
(Lebanon) Al-Ansar
(Kuwait) Al-Qadsia

Semi-finals
(Syria)

Final

=== Quarter-finals ===
The West Region quarter-finals were scheduled to be played on 3 March, with the second legs on 17 March. While the first legs for the East Region were scheduled to be played on 11 March, with the second legs on 18 March.

Team 1	Agg.	Team 2	1st leg	2nd leg
East Region
Shan United (Myanmar)	–	(Indonesia) Borneo	11 Mar	18 Mar
Tainan City (Chinese Taipei)	–	(Philippines) Manila Digger	11 Mar	18 Mar
West Region
Al-Ittihad Ahli (Syria)	–	(Syria) Homs Al-Fidaa	3 Mar	17 Mar
Al-Ansar (Lebanon)	–	(Kuwait) Al-Qadsia	3 Mar	17 Mar

=== Semi-finals ===
The first legs for the West Region will be played on 7 April, with the second legs on 14 April 2027. While the fixtures for the East Region will be played on 8 & 15 April.

Team 1	Agg.	Team 2	1st leg	2nd leg
West Region
Winners of QF1	–	Winners of QF2	8 Apr	15 Apr
East Region
Winners of QF3 (Syria)	–	Winners of QF4	7 Apr	14 Apr

== Top scorers ==
Team eliminated / inactive for this round / matches voided by AFC

Rank	Player	Team	MD1	MD2	MD3	QF1	QF2	SF1	SF2	F	Total
1	(Spain) Chiki	(India) Goa	1	1	1						3
1	(Brazil) Alef Firmino	(Syria) Al-Ittihad Ahli		2	1						3
1	(Morocco) Hamza Khabba	(Kuwait) Al-Qadsia	1		2						3
4	(Syria) Abdulrahman Al Hasan	(Syria) Al-Ittihad Ahli		2							2
4	(The Gambia) Saikou Ceesay	(Philippines) Manila Digger	1		1						2
4	(Tajikistan) Faridun Davlatov	(Tajikistan) Regar-TadAZ	2								2
4	(Philippines) Dylan De Bruycker	(Philippines) Manila Digger	1		1						2
4	(Brazil) Pedro de Paula	(Brunei) Kasuka			2						2
4	(Turkmenistan) Ýakupmuhammet Gowşudow	(Turkmenistan) Ahal	1		1						2
4	(Chinese Taipei) Lin Hai-cheng	(Chinese Taipei) Hang Yuan	1	1							2
4	(Nigeria) Godwin Prince	(Philippines) Manila Digger			2						2
4	(Senegal) Elhadji Malick Tall	(Lebanon) Al-Ansar		2							2
4	(Bangladesh) Rafayel Tudu	(Bangladesh) Fortis		1	1						2

Note

- Goals scored in the qualifying play-offs and matches voided by AFC are not counted when determining top scorer (Regulations Article 64.4)

== See also ==
- 2026–27 AFC Champions League Elite
- 2026–27 AFC Champions League Two
- 2026–27 AFC Women's Champions League
