= Rafayel Tudu =

Bangladeshi footballer (born 2001)

Personal information
- Full name: Rafayel Tudu
- Date of birth: 7 May 2001 (age 25)
- Place of birth: Godagari, Rajshahi District, Bangladesh
- Height: 1.73 m (5 ft 8 in)
- Position: Striker

Team information
- Current team: Fortis

Youth career
- 2019–2020: Kishore FA

Senior career*
Years	Team	Apps	(Gls)
2020–2021	Victoria SC	8	(0)
2023–2025	Fakirerpool YMC	25	(13)
2025–2026	Mohammedan SC	11	(2)
2026–	Fortis	3	(2)
- * Club domestic league appearances and goals as of 12 October 2026

Rafayel Tudu (Bengali: রাফায়েল টুডু; Santali (Latin): Rạfạyel Ṭuḍu; Santali: ᱨᱟᱯᱷᱟᱭᱮᱞ ᱴᱩᱰᱩ; born 7 May 2001) is a Bangladeshi professional footballer who plays as a striker for Bangladesh Premier League club Fortis.

== Early life ==
Born in Godagari Upazila of Rajshahi District, Tudu hails from the ethnic Santal community. He began his football journey as a goalkeeper while training at the Kishore Football Academy in Rajshahi.

Tudu's transition from goalkeeper to striker began during a local academy match, when he played in an attacking position and scored a goal. After scoring in several subsequent matches, his coach, Mamunul Islam Zed, began regularly deploying him as a forward.

== Club career ==
=== Victoria SC ===
In 2020, Tudu began his professional league career as the third-choice goalkeeper for Victoria Sporting Club in the Bangladesh Championship League. He made 8 appearances, 4 of which were as a substitute during the 2020–21 league season as his club suffered relegation. He notably started as goalkeeper during the club's 0–6 and 2–8 defeats to NoFeL SC and Fortis FC, respectively. Eventually, he departed the club following his debut season.

=== Fakirerpool YMC ===
During both the 2021–22 and 2022–23 seasons of the Bangladesh Championship League, Tudu missed out, instead regularly training at the Kishore Football Academy. However, during a local tournament, Tudu showcased his skills as a striker, even scoring against his own academy team. Impressed by his performance, his academy coaches began utilizing him as an attacking player. This led to Fakirerpool Young Men's Club signing him for the 2023–24 Bangladesh Championship League, where Tudu would register as a striker, making his position change official.

On 19 February 2024, Tudu made his debut for Fakirerpool and scored in a 2–3 defeat to BFF Elite Academy during the league's opening game. On 16 April 2024, Tudu scored a brace as Fakirerpool defeated league leaders PWD Sports Club 4–1. On 7 April 2024, Tudu was man of the match, scoring all four goals as Fakirerpool defeated Uttara FC 4–1. His super hat-trick saw him overtake teammate Dalim Barman in the league's top scorer charts with 10 goals, with three games remaining.

=== Fortis ===
In 2026, Tudu joined Fortis. He scored his first goal of the 2026–27 Bangladesh Football League season in the club's 6–0 victory over Chattogram City. He scored the club's first goal in continental competition in a match against Goa in the 2026–27 AFC Challenge League. He scored again on 23 October 2026, netting Fortis's equaliser in a 3–1 victory over Tajikistan's Regar-TadAZ Tursunzoda, securing the club's first-ever win in continental competition.

== Career statistics ==
=== Club ===
As of 9 April 2024.

Appearances and goals by club, season and competition
Club	Season	League			Domestic Cup (Note: Appearance(s) in Bangladesh Federation Cup)		Other		Continental		Total	
Club	Season	Division	Apps	Goals	Apps	Goals	Apps	Goals	Apps	Goals	Apps	Goals
Victoria SC	2020–21	Bangladesh Championship League	8	0	—		—		—		8	0
Fakirerpool YMC	2023–24	Bangladesh Championship League	11	10	—		—		—		11	10
Career total			19	10	0	0	0	0	0	0	19	10
