= Hamza Khabba =

Moroccan footballer

Personal information
- Date of birth: June 9, 1996 (age 30)
- Place of birth: Mohammedia, Morocco
- Height: 1.87 m (6 ft 2 in)
- Position: Forward

Team information
- Current team: Qadsia

Senior career*
Years	Team	Apps	(Gls)
2015–2019	AS FAR	40	(4)
2017–2018	→ OC Safi (loan)	26	(7)
2019–2022	OC Safi	82	(20)
2022–2025	Al-Arabi SC	84	(41)
2022–2023	→ Raja CA (loan)	25	(2)
2025–2026	AS FAR	22	(2)
2026–	Qadsia	0	(0)

International career
2014	Morocco U20	2	(1)
- * Club domestic league appearances and goals as of 29 July 2025

Hamza Khabba (Arabic: حمزة خابا; born June 9, 1996) is a Moroccan professional footballer who plays as a forward for Qadsia of Kuwait Premier League.

== Club career ==
On 1 April 2023, Khabba scored a brace in a 3–1 victory against Simba S.C. in the 2022–23 CAF Champions League.

== Honours ==
- Kuwaiti Premier League top scorer: 2023–24
