= Chiki (footballer) =

Spanish footballer (born 1996)

Personal information
- Full name: Christian Borrego Isabel
- Date of birth: 5 October 1996 (age 30)
- Place of birth: Madrid, Spain
- Height: 1.71 m (5 ft 7 in)
- Position: Forward

Team information
- Current team: Goa

Youth career
- –2015: Leganés

Senior career*
Years	Team	Apps	(Gls)
2015–2017	Leganés B	61	(14)
2017–2018	Rayo Majadahonda	18	(3)
2018–2020	Sporting B	61	(9)
2020–2022	Cornellà	55	(21)
2022–2024	Alcorcón	73	(12)
2024–2025	Racing Ferrol	34	(1)
2025–2026	Cartagena	36	(6)
2026–	Goa	2	(2)
- * Club domestic league appearances and goals as of 28 October 2026

Christian Borrego Isabel (born 5 October 1996), commonly known as Chiki, is a Spanish footballer who plays for Indian Super League club Goa. Mainly a forward, he can also play as a winger.

== Club career ==
Chiki was born in Madrid, and represented CD Leganés as a youth. He made his senior debut with the reserves during the 2015–16 season, scoring 10 goals as the club achieved promotion to Tercera División.

On 19 June 2017, Chiki signed for Segunda División B side CF Rayo Majadahonda. On 27 July of the following year, after featuring sparingly, he moved to Sporting de Gijón and was assigned to the B-team also in the third tier.

Chiki left Sporting on 26 June 2020, and joined UE Cornellà still in the third division on 4 August. On 11 July 2022, after scoring a career-best 15 goals in the previous campaign, he agreed to a contract with AD Alcorcón, freshly relegated to Primera Federación.

On 6 July 2023, after being a regular starter for during the season as his side returned to Segunda División at first attempt, Chiki renewed his link with Alkor for a further year. He made his professional debut on 14 August, coming on as a second-half substitute for Koldo Obieta in a 4–0 away loss to CD Mirandés.

Chiki scored his first professional goal on 11 September 2023, netting a last-minute equalizer in a 2–2 away draw against CD Eldense. The following 3 July, after Alcorcón's relegation, he joined Racing de Ferrol also in division two.
