= Mohammed Al-Hamad Stadium =

Multi-purpose stadium in Hawally, Kuwait

Coordinates: 29°20′24″N 48°1′49″E

Mohammed al-Hamad Stadium
- Interactive map of Mohammed al-Hamad Stadium
- Full name: Mohammed al-Hamad Stadium
- Location: Hawally, Kuwait
- Operator: Al Qadsia Kuwait
- Capacity: 22,000
- Surface: Grass

Construction
- Opened: 1960

Tenant
- Qadsia SC (1960–present)

Mohammed al-Hamad Stadium is a multi-purpose stadium designed and certified meeting FIFA international standards in Hawally, Kuwait. It is currently used mostly for football matches. The stadium holds 22,000.

The stadium is the home of Al Qadsia Kuwait.

== Name ==
The name of the stadium is in honour of first manager for the club and one of the club's founders Mohammed Al-Hamad. The stadium was named after his death in 1980.

== See also ==
- List of football stadiums in Kuwait
