= Hawally, Kuwait =

Hawally حولي
- Location within Kuwait
- Coordinates: 29°20′N 48°2′E
- Country: Kuwait
- Governorate: Hawalli Governorate
- Established: 1906

Area
  - Total: 6.7 km^{2} (2.6 sq mi)

Population
  - Total: 218,141
  - Urban density: 24,500/km^{2} (63,000/sq mi)
- Time zone: UTC+3 (AST)

Hawally (Arabic: حولي) is an area in, and the namesake of, the Hawalli Governorate, located in the State of Kuwait.

Hawally is a large settlement and the commercial center for most computer-related goods in Kuwait. Prior to the first Gulf War, it housed many Palestinians, but many left during and after the War. Currently, Hawally is home to many of the Arab populations in Kuwait including Egyptians, Syrians, Iraqis and Lebanese. It is also home to many Southeast and South Asians including Filipinos, Indians, Nepalis, Bengalis and Pakistanis. It's adjacent to the Nugra area (Arabic: النقرة).

== Block divisions ==
Hawally is administratively divided into 12 blocks. These blocks tend to be mostly residential.

== History ==
The settlement was first established in the 7th century around fresh water wells that were dug during Al-Ala al-Hadhrami's time in what is now Kuwait and later officially became a village in 1906 during Al Sabah's rule.

The area began as a modest coastal settlement, primarily a fishing and pearling village, taking advantage of its Gulf location and access to marine resources.

The name “Hawally” in Arabic refers to anything that has completed a full year, but according to Kuwaiti historian Saif Marzouq Al-Shamlan in his book From the History of Kuwait, the village received its name due to the sweetness of its water; from the Arabic phrase "الحلو لي " meaning "the fresh [water] for me".

Kuwaiti artist Ayoub Al-Ayoub described old Hawally in his book Hawally: Village of Joy and Comfort as a small, peaceful village blessed with a good location, clean air, fertile soil, fresh water wells suitable for farming, and vibrant green trees.

Historically, the village was divided into two parts: East Hawally and Jibla Hawally, separated by a seasonal rainwater stream called “Al-Bahra,” which flowed from south to north. Important landmarks of the old village included its earliest mosque, Bin Owaid Mosque, built in 1920; Al-Mutayna, a large pit used to extract clay for building houses; and Dhila’ Wadha, a small hill in the southeast of the village that residents used as a picnic area.

== Population ==
As of 2022, the population of Hawally is estimated to be 218,141

== Sport ==
Hawally is home to Qadsia SC and Mohammed Al-Hamad Stadium, Its football stadium is one of the most famous in Kuwait and is a popular venue for many international matches that happen within the region.

== Landmarks ==
Hawally houses many landmarks that are widely recognized, such as Ben Oayyed Mosque, built in 1920. Other landmarks include Bait al-Othman, Mirror House, and Muhallab Complex.

Hawally also has its own theme park, Hawally Park, which is near the Muhallab Complex. There are also many restaurants and malls in the area, such as Al-Rihab Comples, which is considered the hub for gaming in Kuwait as it contains many video game shops including some that sells clsssic systems, and Promenade Mall. The Mirror House is a traditional Kuwaiti house made of glass; The Bait al-Othman is a museum in the famous Abdullah al Othman St in Hawally, containing many old Kuwaiti sculptures, artifacts and pictures. It is also where questions are asked for rewards of over 50 KD daily in Ramadan.

== Education ==
There are several educational institutions located in Hawally. There is a large number of schools catering to different nationalities. Notably among these are the Indian, Arab, and Pakistani schools present in the area serving their respective communities.

Name	Address	Website
Universal American School	Hawally, Block 1, Mousa Bin Nassir St.	https://www.uas.edu.kw
Rawd Al-Saliheen Bilingual School	Hawally, Block 1, Qutaibah Bin Muslim St.	
Universal Civilizations Academy	Hawally, Block 1, Ibn Rashid St.	https://www.uca.edu.kw
Al-Bayan Bilingual School	Hawally, Block 1, Beirut St.	https://www.bbs.edu.kw
Kuwait National English School	Hawally, Block 2, Ibn Rashid St.	https://www.knes.edu.kw
Al-Rajaa' Girls' School	Hawally, Block 3, Ibn Rashid St.	
Daar Iqra Wartaq Preschool	Hawally, Block 3, 82 St.	
Tahil Al-Tarbiat Al-Fikria Girls' School	Hawally, Block 5, Al-Mutasim St.	
Al-'Amal Watahil Al-'Amal Girls' School	Hawally, Block 5, Al-Mutasim St.	
Al-Rajaa' Boys' Primary School	Hawally, Block 5, Al-Mutasim St.	
Al-Rajaa' Boys' Middle and Secondary School	Hawally, Block 5, Al-Mutasim St.	
Pakistan National English School	Hawally, Block 6, 353 St.	
Qutoof School	Hawally, Block 6, Muthana St.	
American School of Kuwait	Hawally, Block 7, Muthana St.	https://www.ask.edu.kw/
New Pakistan International School	Hawally, Block 8, Surqa Bin Malik St.	https://www.npiskuwait.com/
The English Academy	Hawally, Block 8, Al-Hassan Al-Basri St.	https://tea.edu.kw
Al-Jeel Al-Jadeed Al-'Ahlia School	Hawally, Block 8, Tunis St.	https://www.daleeeel.com/en-kw/location/9317/al-jeel-al-jadeed-school-hawally-kuwait
Al-Bayan International School	Hawally, Block 9, Abdullah Abdullatif Al-Othman St.	
Pakistan Sunshine School	Hawally, Block 9, Surqa Bin Malik St.	
Cambridge English School	Hawally, Block 9, Surqa Bin Malik St.	https://www.cambridgehawally-kw.com
American Creativity Academy	Hawally, Block 9, Sharhabeel Bin Husnah St.	https://aca.edu.kw/
Abdulmalik Al-Saleh Kindergarten	Hawally, Block 10, Beirut Street	
Kuwait International English School	Hawally, Block 10, Al-Hassan Al-Basri St.	https://www.kieskuwait.com/
Juariya Bint Al-Harith Girls' Primary School	Hawally, Block 11, Mohammed Ali Al-Dukhan St.	
Al-Qabas Al-'Ahlia Private School	Hawally, Block 11, 206 St.	https://findruba.com/school/al-qabas-private-school
Hawally Pakistan English School	Hawally, Block 11, 177 St.	https://www.hpeskuwait.net/
Al-Adiliyah Primary School	Hawally, Block 12, Sharhabeel Bin Husnah St.	
Al-Najat Boys' Private Middle School	Hawally, Block 12, Sharhabeel Bin Husnah St.	https://alnajat.edu.kw/

== Notable people ==
- Abdullah Kamel Abdullah Kamel Al Kandari - Guantanamo Bay detainee
- Laila Alsabaan - Arabic and Kuwaiti dialect linguist
