= Tanvir Hossain =

Bangladeshi footballer

Personal information
- Full name: Mohamed Tanvir Hossain
- Date of birth: 13 December 2003 (age 22)
- Place of birth: Birampur, Dinajpur, Bangladesh
- Height: 1.75 m (5 ft 9 in)
- Position: Center-back

Team information
- Current team: City Club
- Number: 5

Youth career
- 2017–2021: BKSP

Senior career*
Years	Team	Apps	(Gls)
2018–2022	Saif	3	(0)
2022–2023	Rahmatganj	18	(0)
2023–2024	Sheikh Russel	9	(0)
2024–2025	Rahmatganj	14	(2)
2025–2026	Bashundhara Kings	6	(0)
2026–	City Club	3	(0)

International career^{‡}
2019–2022	Bangladesh U20	16	(2)
Medal record
Men's football
Representing Bangladesh
SAFF U-20 Championship
Runner-up	2019 Nepal	Team
Runner-up	2022 India	Team
- * Club domestic league appearances and goals as of 24 October 2026 ‡ National team caps and goals as of 18 September 2022

Tanvir Hossain (Bengali: তানভীর হোসেন; born 13 December 2003) is a Bangladeshi professional footballer who plays as a center-back for Bangladesh Football League club City Club.

== Club career ==
=== Saif Sporting Club ===
In 2018, Tanvir joined Saif Sporting Club while still being a student at Bangladesh Krira Shikkha Protishtan (BKSP). On 11 May 2021, he made his professional debut against Muktijoddha Sangsad KC. However, Tanvir only managed to make three appearances during his four seasons with the club and was eventually released after its disbanding.

=== Rahmatganj MFS ===
In 2022, he joined Rahmatganj MFS after his impressive performances while captaining the Bangladesh U20 team.

== International career ==
Tanvir made his debut for the Bangladesh U19 team during the 2019 SAFF U-18 Championship. On 21 September 2019, he scored against Sri Lanka U19 during a victory which helped Bangladesh advance to the semi-final. On 27 September 2019, he struck the opening goal as Bangladesh trashed Bhutan U19 4–0 to earn a place in the tournament's final. He also represented the team in the 2020 AFC U-19 Championship qualifiers and appeared in all three qualifying games.

In 2022, he made a return to international football by captaining Bangladesh during the 2022 SAFF U-20 Championship, where his team, similar to the previous edition, finished runners-up. In the same year, he once again captained the team during the 2023 AFC U-20 Asian Cup qualifiers. In 2023, he was named in the final squad for the 2022 Asian Games, in Hangzhou, China.

== Career statistics ==
=== Club ===
As of 7 July 2023.

Appearances and goals by club, season and competition
Club	Season	League			Domestic Cup (Note: Appearance(s) in Bangladesh Federation Cup)		Other (Note: Appearance(s) in Bangladesh Independence Cup)		Continental		Total	
Club	Season	Division	Apps	Goals	Apps	Goals	Apps	Goals	Apps	Goals	Apps	Goals
Saif SC	2018–19	Bangladesh Premier League	0	0	0	0	0	0	—		0	0
Saif SC	2019–20	Bangladesh Premier League	0	0	0	0	0	0	—		0	0
Saif SC	2020–21	Bangladesh Premier League	2	0	0	0	—		—		2	0
Saif SC	2021–22	Bangladesh Premier League	1	0	0	0	0	0	—		1	0
Saif SC	Saif SC total		3	0	0	0	0	0	0	0	3	0
Rahmatganj MFS	2022–23	Bangladesh Premier League	18	0	4	0	3	0	0	0	25	0
Career total			21	0	4	0	3	0	0	0	28	0

=== International goals ===
==== Youth ====
#	Date	Venue	Opponent	Score	Result	Competition
1.	21 September 2019	APF Stadium, Kathmandu, Nepal	Sri Lanka	1–0	3–0	2019 SAFF U-18 Championship
2.	27 September 2019	APF Stadium, Kathmandu, Nepal	Bhutan	1–0	4–0	2019 SAFF U-18 Championship

== Honours ==
Individual

- SAFF U-20 Championship top scorer: 2019
