= Foysal Ahmed Fahim =

Bangladeshi footballer (born 2002)

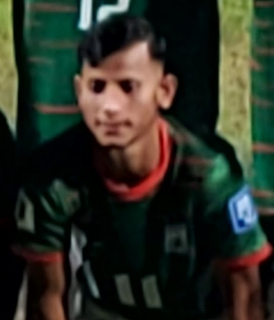
- Fahim with Bangladesh in 2023

Personal information
- Full name: Mohammed Foysal Ahmed Fahim
- Date of birth: 24 February 2002 (age 24)
- Place of birth: Sirajganj, Bangladesh
- Height: 1.65 m (5 ft 5 in)
- Positions: Winger; striker

Team information
- Current team: Mohammedan
- Number: 11

Youth career
- 2014–2015: Masumpur KC
- 2015: BFF Sylhet Academy
- 2016–2017: BKSP
- 2017: MSPCC City Club

Senior career*
Years	Team	Apps	(Gls)
2018–2022	Saif SC	57	(11)
2022–2023	Dhaka Abahani	18	(4)
2023–2024	Sheikh Jamal DC	10	(1)
2024–2026	Bashundhara Kings	32	(12)
2026–	Mohammedan	0	(0)

International career^{‡}
2017	Bangladesh U17	6	(7)
2019	Bangladesh U19	9	(2)
2021–2023	Bangladesh U23	6	(0)
2021–	Bangladesh	36	(1)
Medal record
Men's football
Representing Bangladesh
SAFF U-15 Championship
Bronze medal – third place	2017 Nepal	Team
SAFF U-18 Championship
Runner-up	2019 Nepal	Team
- * Club domestic league appearances and goals as of 24 May 2026 ‡ National team caps and goals as of 14 November 2026

Mohammed Foysal Ahmed Fahim (Bengali: মোহাম্মদ ফয়সাল আহমেদ ফাহিম; born 24 February 2002), known as Fahim, is a Bangladeshi professional footballer who plays as a left winger for Bangladesh Premier League club Mohammedan and the Bangladesh national team. A versatile player, Fahim can also operate as a right winger, striker or attacking midfielder.

Fahim began his professional career with Saif Sporting Club in 2018, having played in the Pioneer Football League with MSPCC City Club the previous year. He was named the Best Player of the 2017 Pioneer Football League and also won the Top Scorer Award of the 2017 SAFF U-15 Championship.

== Early career ==
Fahim's football journey started with the traditional Masumpur Krira Chakra in Sirajganj District, under coach and former professional footballer Rezaul Karim Khokon. He then went on to join BFF Sylhet Academy in 2015, which was shut down within a few months of him joining. In 2017, he joined MSPCC City Club in Dhaka and won the Best Player Award of the Pioneer Football League. Initially, due to the money required to pursue football in the country, Fahim's family were reluctant to approve of his desire to take the sport as a profession. Fahim was later admitted to Bangladesh Krira Shikkha Protishtan (BKSP) in Sylhet. In 2017, Fahim was included in the SAFF U-15 Championship squad after alongside eleven of his BKSP teammates after impressing coach Mustafa Anwar Parvez. After being awarded the tournament's golden boot, Fahim signed a professional contract with professional league club Saif Sporting Club the following year.

== Club career ==
=== Saif Sporting Club ===
On 1 July 2018, Fahim was contracted by Saif Sporting Club. Before making his senior team debut, Fahim participated in the 2017–18 BFF U-18 Football Tournament with the U18 team. On 11 April 2019, Fahim made his Bangladesh Premier League debut for Saif during a 3–2 defeat against Bashundhara Kings. On 23 July 2019, Fahim scored his first goal for the club against NoFeL SC in the league. He ended his first professional league season with 2 goals from 7 league games. On 10 December 2021, Fahim scored in the semi-final as Saif defeated Swadhinata KS 2–0 to reach the semi-finals of the 2021 Independence Cup. On 23 June 2022, he netted a brace in a 4–3 victory over Chittagong Abahani. His contributions lead to Saif to their highest league finish in the club's history. However, Fahim found himself a Free agent, as Saif shut down all football activities after the season ended.

=== Abahani Limited Dhaka ===
On 24 February 2023, Fahim celebrated his twenty-first birthday by netting a hat-trick against AFC Uttara in a league fixture.

=== Sheikh Jamal Dhanmondi Club ===
On 28 August 2023, Fahim completed a move to Sheikh Jamal Dhanmondi Club for the 2023–24 season.

== International career ==
=== Youth ===
Fahim won the golden boot in the 2017 SAFF U-15 Championship as he finished top scorer with 6 goals out of 4 matches. His goals included a hat-trick against Sri Lanka U15 and he also managed to score in both games against Bhutan U15 one of which came during a 8-0 trashing. He was in the scoresheet again in the semi-finals against Nepal U15 as Bangladesh lost 4–2 and were knocked out of the competition. On 24 September 2017, Fahim scored a long-range winner against the Qatar U16 team and sealed a stunning 2–0 win for Bangladesh during the 2018 AFC U-16 Championship qualifiers. In the end, even though Bangladesh failed to qualify for the main tournament, the victory was seen as a huge achievement and attracted the attention of local media.

Fahim was the joint top scorer in the 2019 SAFF U-18 Championship alongside his teammate Tanvir Hossain and Gurkirat Singh from India U18. His goals came against Sri Lanka U18 in the group stages and Bhutan U18 during the semi-finals of the tournament. He was also in the squad during a disappointing 2020 AFC U-19 Championship qualification campaign. In 2019, he also participated in the U19 Three Nations Tournament, hosted by Qatar FA.

Fahim was named on the Bangladesh U23 team by coach Maruful Haque for the AFC U-23 Championship 2022 qualifiers. He managed to play in all of the 3 games, the qualifiers ended with Bangladesh failing to score a single time. Although the poor performances shown by the team, Fahim was impressive during the games, with his quick feet and dribbling, which earned him a Bangladesh national team call up.

=== Senior ===
In 2020, Fahim was called up to the national team for the first time during the Bangabandhu Gold Cup. Although he was named on the final squad list, he did not participate in any of the games. He was called up once again, this time for the 2018 FIFA World Cup qualifiers in June 2021, bu failed to join the team in the end due to passport complications. He was also named in Jamie Day's 35-man preliminary squad for the 2021 SAFF Championship, however, his name was cut off when interim coach Óscar Bruzón named his final squad.

On 13 November 2021, Fahim finally made his debut for the Bangladesh national team coming on as a substitute for Mohammad Ibrahim during the start of the second half against Maldives in the 2021 Four Nations Football Tournament. Bangladesh won the game 2–1 which was their first victory against Maldives in 18 years.

He was included in the final squad for the 2023 SAFF Championship. On 22 June 2023, Fahim squandered a one on one goal scoring opportunity against the Lebanese goalkeeper, to give Bangladesh the lead in the tournament opener against Lebanon. He came under heavy criticism from local media, after his team went down 0–2.

On 17 October 2023, Fahim assisted the opening goal and scored the winner against Maldives in the second leg of the 2026 FIFA World Cup qualification – AFC first round, securing Bangladesh a 3–2 aggregate victory and a place in the second round.

== Career statistics ==
=== Club ===
As of 23 February 2024.

Appearances and goals by club, season and competition
Club	Season	League			Domestic Cup (Note: Appearance(s) in Bangladesh Federation Cup)		Other (Note: Appearance(s) in Bangladesh Independence Cup)		Continental		Total	
Club	Season	Division	Apps	Goals	Apps	Goals	Apps	Goals	Apps	Goals	Apps	Goals
Saif SC	2018–19	Bangladesh Premier League	7	2	0	0	0	0	—		7	2
Saif SC	2019–20	Bangladesh Premier League	5	1	2	0	—		—		7	1
Saif SC	2020–21	Bangladesh Premier League	24	3	5	1	—		—		29	4
Saif SC	2021–22	Bangladesh Premier League	21	5	1	0	5	2	—		27	7
Saif SC	Saif SC total		57	11	8	1	5	2	0	0	70	14
Dhaka Abahani	2022–23	Bangladesh Premier League	18	4	4	3	5	0	—		27	7
Dhaka Abahani	2023–24	Bangladesh Premier League	0	0	0	0	0	0	2 (Note: Appearance(s) in AFC Cup)	0	2	0
Dhaka Abahani	Dhaka Abahani total		18	4	4	3	5	0	2	0	29	7
Sheikh Jamal DC	2023–24	Bangladesh Premier League	9	1	2	2	2	0	—		13	3
Career total			84	16	14	6	12	2	2	0	112	24

=== International ===
As of 14 November 2026.

Bangladesh national team
Year	Apps	Goals
2021	1	0
2022	6	0
2023	10	1
2024	8	0
2025	5	0
2026	6	0
Total	36	1

=== International goals ===
==== Youth ====
Scores and results list Bangladesh's goal tally first.

No.	Date	Venue	Opponent	Score	Result	Competition
1.	18 August 2017	ANFA Complex, Lalitpur, Nepal	Sri Lanka	1–0	4–0	2017 SAFF U-15 Championship
2.	18 August 2017	ANFA Complex, Lalitpur, Nepal	Sri Lanka	2–0	4–0	2017 SAFF U-15 Championship
3.	18 August 2017	ANFA Complex, Lalitpur, Nepal	Sri Lanka	4–0	4–0	2017 SAFF U-15 Championship
4.	22 August 2017	ANFA Complex, Lalitpur, Nepal	Bhutan	1–0	3–0	2017 SAFF U-15 Championship
5.	25 August 2017	ANFA Complex, Lalitpur, Nepal	Nepal	1–3	2–4	2017 SAFF U-15 Championship
6.	27 August 2017	ANFA Complex, Lalitpur, Nepal	Bhutan	1–0	8–0	2017 SAFF U-15 Championship
7.	24 September 2017	Grand Hamad Stadium, Doha, Qatar	Qatar	2–0	2–0	2018 AFC U-16 Championship qualifiers
8.	21 September 2019	APF Stadium, Kathmandu, Nepal	Sri Lanka	3–0	3–0	2019 SAFF U-19 Championship
9.	27 September 2019	APF Stadium, Kathmandu, Nepal	Bhutan	2–0	4–0	2019 SAFF U-19 Championship
Last updated 27 September 2019

==== Senior ====
No.	Date	Venue	Opponent	Score	Result	Competition
1.	17 October 2023	Bashundhara Kings Arena, Dhaka, Bangladesh	Maldives	2–1	2–1	2026 FIFA World Cup qualification
Last updated 17 October 2023

== Honours ==
Individual

- 2017 − Pioneer Football League Best Player
- 2017 − SAFF U-15 Championship Top Scorer
- 2019 − SAFF U-18 Championship Top Scorer (jointly)
