= Maraz Hossain Opi =

Bangladeshi footballer

Maraz Hossain
Personal information
- Full name: Maraz Hossain Opi
- Date of birth: 10 March 2001 (age 25)
- Place of birth: Gazipur, Bangladesh
- Height: 1.70 m (5 ft 7 in)
- Positions: Attacking midfielder; centre forward

Youth career
- 2013–2019: BKSP
- 2017: Kingstar SC

Senior career*
Years	Team	Apps	(Gls)
2017–2022	Saif SC	49	(6)
2022–2024	Dhaka Abahani	18	(2)
2024–2025	Rahmatganj MFS	1	(0)

International career^{‡}
2018–2019	Bangladesh U18	4	(1)
2019–2020	Bangladesh U19	3	(0)
2021–2023	Bangladesh U23	3	(0)
2022	Bangladesh	3	(0)
Medal record
Men's football
Representing Bangladesh
SAFF U-15 Championship
Winner	2015 Bangladesh	Team
SAFF U-18 Championship
Runner-up	2019 Nepal	Team
- * Club domestic league appearances and goals as of 18 January 2025 ‡ National team caps and goals as of 8 June 2022

Maraz Hossain Opi (Bengali: মারাজ হোসেন অপি; born 10 March 2001) is a Bangladeshi professional footballer who plays as an attacking midfielder. He last played for Bangladesh Premier League club Rahmatganj MFS.

== International career ==
=== Youth ===
Meraz was part of the Bangladesh U16 team that won the 2015 SAFF U-16 Championship.

While studying at BKSP, Bangladesh U18 head coach at the time Peter Turner included Maraz in the squad for the 2019 SAFF U-18 Championship in Nepal. On 27 September 2019, Maraz scored for the U18 team as they trashed Bhutan 4–0 to reach the finals of the tournament.

The following year, Peter Turner who was in charge of the Bangladesh U19 selected Maraz for the 2020 AFC U-19 Championship qualifiers, where Bangladesh failed to win a single game and even suffered a defeat at the hands of Bhutan.

In September 2021, interim appointed Maruful Haque named Maraz in his squad for the 2022 AFC U-23 Asian Cup qualifiers. After less than a months training, the team produced frustrating results at they conceded a total of 11 goals during the three matches played. Maraz started all three games for the team throughout the qualifiers.

=== Senior ===
Maraz was called up to a 30-member preliminary team by Jamie Day before the 2021 SAFF Championship. However, after Days's dismissal only a month before the tournament, interim coach Óscar Bruzón did not keep him in the final squad.

On 24 March 2022, Maraz made his debut for the Bangladesh national football team, coming on as a substitute for Biplu Ahmed in the 87th minute against Maldives. Bangladesh ended up losing the friendly 2–0.

== Career statistics ==
=== Club ===
As of 2 June 2023.

Club	Season	League			Domestic Cup (Note: Appearance(s) in Bangladesh Federation Cup)		Other (Note: Appearance(s) in Bangladesh Independence Cup)		Continental		Total	
Club	Season	Division	Apps	Goals	Apps	Goals	Apps	Goals	Apps	Goals	Apps	Goals
Saif Sporting Club	2017–18	Bangladesh Premier League	5	0	0	0	0	0	0	0	5	0
Saif Sporting Club	2018–19	Bangladesh Premier League	5	0	0	0	3	0	—		8	0
Saif Sporting Club	2019–20	Bangladesh Premier League	2	0	0	0	—		—		2	0
Saif Sporting Club	2020–21	Bangladesh Premier League	18	3	3	1	—		—		21	4
Saif Sporting Club	2021–22	Bangladesh Premier League	19	3	3	2	6	1	—		28	6
Saif Sporting Club	Saif Sporting Club total		49	6	6	3	9	1	0	0	64	10
Abahani Limited Dhaka	2022–23	Bangladesh Premier League	13	1	2	0	4	0	—		19	1
Abahani Limited Dhaka	2023–24	Bangladesh Premier League	0	0	0	0	0	0	0	0	0	0
Career total			62	7	8	3	13	1	0	0	83	11

=== International ===
As of match played 8 June 2022

Bangladesh national team
Year	Apps	Goals
2022	3	0
Total	3	0

=== International goals ===
==== Youth ====
#	Date	Venue	Opponent	Score	Result	Competition
1.	27 September 2019	APF Stadium, Kathmandu	Bhutan U18	3–0	4–0	2019 SAFF U-18 Championship

== Honours ==
Bangladesh U16

- SAFF U-16 Championship: 2015

Individual

- 2017 − Pioneer Football League Top Scorer
