= 2026 SAFF U-20 Championship =

Vector X SAFF U-20 Championship Maldives 2026

Tournament details
- Host country: Maldives
- Dates: 23 March–3 April 2026
- Teams: 7 (from 1 sub-confederation)
- Venue: 1 (in 1 host city)

Final positions
- Champions: Bangladesh (2nd title)
- Runners-up: India
- Third place: Nepal; Bhutan

Tournament statistics
- Matches played: 12
- Goals scored: 25 (2.08 per match)
- Attendance: 23,864 (1,989 per match)
- Top scorer(s): (Maldives) Ilan Imran (India) Omang Dodum (3 goals each)
- Best player: (India) Omang Dodum
- Best goalkeeper: (Bangladesh) Md Ismail Hossain Mahin
- Fair play award: Maldives

The 2026 SAFF U-20 Championship was the 8th edition of the SAFF U-20 Championship, an international football competition for men's under-20 national teams from South Asia region, organized by the South Asian Football Federation (SAFF). The tournament took place in Malé, Maldives, from 23 March to 3 April 2026.

On 3 April 2026, Bangladesh clinched their second title by defeating India 4–3 on penalties in the final after a 0–0 draw at the end of normal time.

== Venue ==
The National Football Stadium of Malé, Maldives hosted all the matches.

Malé	2026 SAFF U-20 Championship is located in Maldives
National Football Stadium	2026 SAFF U-20 Championship is located in Maldives
Capacity: 11,850	2026 SAFF U-20 Championship is located in Maldives

== Participant teams ==
The following seven national teams participated in the tournament.

Team	Appearances	Previous best performance
Bangladesh	8th	Champions (2024)
Bhutan	7th	Fourth place (2017, 2019)
India	8th	Champions (2019, 2022, 2023, 2025)
Maldives (Host)	8th	Third place (2019)
Nepal	8th	Champions (2015, 2017)
Sri Lanka	5th	Group stage (2019, 2022)
Pakistan	2nd	Runners-up (2023)

== Draw ==
The draw ceremony of the tournament was held on 25 January 2026.

Pot 1	Pot 2	Pot 3
Bangladesh; Maldives (H)	Nepal; India	Bhutan; Sri Lanka; Pakistan

=== Draw result ===
Group A
Pos	Team
A1	Maldives
A2	Nepal
A3	Bhutan
A4	Sri Lanka

Group B
Pos	Team
B1	Bangladesh
B2	India
B3	Pakistan

== Players eligibility ==
Players born on or after 1 January 2007 were eligible to take part in the tournament.

== Squads ==
All the teams announced their squads before the tournament began.

== Match officials ==
Referees

- (Bangladesh) SM Jashim Akhter
- (India) Jatinder Singh
- (Maldives) Raeef Rauf (†)
- (Nepal) Umesh Bidari (†)
- (Sri Lanka) Mohamed Rideewita Withana Chirantha
- (Bhutan) Virendha Rai (†)
- (Pakistan) Anjum Adnan (†)

Assistant Referees & Fourth Officials

- (Bangladesh) Bikash Sarker
- (Bhutan) Wangchuk Phurpa
- (India) Churchil Rana
- (Maldives) Shaheem Hussain
- (Nepal) Madhav Khatri Chhettri
- (Sri Lanka) Don Lakshan Sampath
- (Pakistan) Dilawar Khan

Match Commissioners

- (Maldives) Abdul Ghafoor Abdul Hameed
- (Sri Lanka) Mohamed Fairoze Muhiseen

Referee Accessors

- (Sri Lanka) Hettiarachchige Chathuranga Dilan Perera

(†): Also performed as assistant referee in some matches.

== Group stage ==
Key to colours in group tables
Group winners and runners-up advanced to the Semi-finals

=== Group A ===
Pos	Team	Pld	W	D	L	GF	GA	GD	Pts	Qualification
1	Nepal	3	2	1	0	4	2	+2	7	Advanced to the Semi-finals
2	Bhutan	3	1	1	1	2	2	0	4	Advanced to the Semi-finals
3	Sri Lanka	3	1	0	2	3	4	−1	3	
4	Maldives (H)	3	0	2	1	3	4	−1	2	

Source: Sofascore
(H) Hosts
23 March 2026
15:45

Bhutan	1–2	Nepal
Dhendup 84'	Report	Dangol 7'; S. Bam 53'

National Football Stadium, Malé
Attendance: 150
Referee: SM Jasim Akther (Bangladesh)
Man of the Match: Subash Bam (Nepal)

23 March 2026
20:30

Maldives	2–3	Sri Lanka
Imran 28', 45+12'	Report	Mohamed 46'; Hijaazy 63'; Hussain 88' (pen.)

National Football Stadium, Malé
Attendance: 1,664
Referee: Jatinder Singh (India)
Man of the Match: Hussain Abdullah (Sri Lanka)

25 March 2026
15:45

Sri Lanka	0–1	Nepal
	Report	S. Bam 24'

National Football Stadium, Malé
Attendance: 451
Referee: Raeef Rauf (Maldives)
Man of the Match: Subash Bam (Nepal)

25 March 2026
20:30

Bhutan	0–0	Maldives
	Report

National Football Stadium, Malé
Attendance: 1,470
Referee: Umesh Bidari (Nepal)
Man of the Match: Tandin Penjor (Bhutan)

27 March 2026
15:45

Maldives	1–1	Nepal
Imran 14'	Report	Lawat 86'

National Football Stadium, Malé
Attendance: 3,863
Referee: Adnan Anjum (Pakistan)
Man of the Match: Mohamed Ilan Imran (Maldives)
- Nepal qualified for the Semi-finals as a result of this match.

27 March 2026
20:30

Bhutan	1–0	Sri Lanka
Dhendup 90+2'	Report

National Football Stadium, Malé
Attendance: 714
Referee: Jatinder Singh (India)
Man of the Match: Dhendup Gyeltshen (Bhutan)
- Bhutan qualified for the Semi-finals as a result of this match.

=== Group B ===
Pos	Team	Pld	W	D	L	GF	GA	GD	Pts	Qualification
1	India	2	1	1	0	4	1	+3	4	Advanced to the Semi-finals
2	Bangladesh	2	1	1	0	3	1	+2	4	Advanced to the Semi-finals
3	Pakistan	2	0	0	2	0	5	−5	0	

Source: Sofascore
24 March 2026
15:45

Bangladesh	2–0	Pakistan
R. Sullivan 54', 67'	Report

National Football Stadium, Malé
Attendance: 2,550
Referee: Mohamed Rideewita Withana Chirantha (Sri Lanka)
Man of the Match: Ronan Sullivan (Bangladesh)

26 March 2026
15:45

India	3–0	Pakistan
V. Yadav 3'; Dodum 64', 88' (pen.)	Report

National Football Stadium, Malé
Attendance: 334
Referee: Virendha Rai (Bhutan)
Man of the Match: Omang Dodum (India)
- India and Bangladesh qualified for the Semi-finals as a result of this match.

28 March 2026
15:45

Bangladesh	1–1	India
Riyad 45+10'	Report	V. Yadav 17'

National Football Stadium, Malé
Attendance: 3,932
Referee: Raeef Rauf (Maldives)
Man of the Match: Suraj Singh (India)

== Knockout stage ==
- In the knockout stage, if a match finished goalless at the end of normal playing time, extra time would have been played (two periods of 15 minutes each) and followed, if necessary, by a penalty shoot-out to determine the winner.

=== Bracket ===
Semi-finals
1 April – Malé
Nepal	0
Bangladesh	1
1 April – Malé
India	5
Bhutan	0

Final
3 April – Malé
Bangladesh (p)	0 (4)
India	0 (3)

=== Semi-finals ===
1 April 2026
15:45

Nepal	0–1	Bangladesh
	Report	Manik 10'

National Football Stadium, Malé
Attendance: 3,910
Referee: Jatinder Singh (India)
Man of the Match: Md Manik (Bangladesh)

1 April 2026
20:30

India	5–0	Bhutan
Dodum 4'; Arbash 44'; Chaphamayum 56', 57'; Thokchom 90+2'	Report

National Football Stadium, Malé
Attendance: 726
Referee: Mohamed Rideewita Withana Chirantha (Sri Lanka)
Man of the Match: Rohen Chaphamayum (India)

=== Final ===
3 April 2026
20:00

Bangladesh	0–0	India
	Report
Penalties
Murshed (penalty scored); Chandon (penalty scored); Fahim (penalty scored); Raksam (penalty missed); R. Sullivan (penalty scored)	4–3	(penalty missed) Rishi; (penalty scored) Arbash; (penalty scored) Samson; (penalty scored) Vishal; (penalty missed) Dodum

National Football Stadium, Malé
Attendance: 4,100
Referee: Umesh Bidari (Nepal)
Man of the Match: Omang Dodum (India)

== Champion ==
8th SAFF U-20 Championship 2026 Champions

Bangladesh
Second title

== Statistics ==
=== Goalscorers ===
There were 25 goals scored in 12 matches, for an average of 2.08 goals per match.

3 goals

- (Maldives) Mohamed Ilan Imran
- (India) Omang Dodum

2 goals

- (Bangladesh) Ronan Sullivan
- (Nepal) Subash Bam
- (Bhutan) Dhendup Gyeltshen
- (India) Vishal Yadav
- (India) Rohen Singh Chaphamayum

1 goal

- (Bangladesh) Mohammed Manik
- (Nepal) Sujan Dangol
- (Sri Lanka) K. Mohamed Katheem
- (Sri Lanka) М. М. Ahamed Hijaazy
- (Sri Lanka) M. Hussain Abdullah
- (Nepal) Nishan Raj Lawat
- (Bangladesh) Mohammed Abdul Riyad
- (India) Mohammed Arbash
- (India) Malemngamba Singh Thokchom

Source: Soccerway

== Awards ==
The following awards were given at the conclusion of the tournament:

Fair Play Award	Best goalkeeper	Top scorer(s)	Most valuable player
Maldives	(Bangladesh) Md Ismail Hossain Mahin	(Maldives) Ilan Imran (India) Omang Dodum	(India) Omang Dodum

== Broadcasting ==
SAFF officially released the list of broadcast channels for the tournament.

Broadcaster(s)	Territory
Sportzworkz^{(YouTube channel)}	No restricted territory

== See also ==
- 2026 SAFF U-17 Championship
- 2026 SAFF U-23 Championship
- 2026 SAFF Futsal Championship
- 2026 SAFF Club Championship
- 2026 SAFF U-19 Women's Championship
