= 2022–23 Rahmatganj MFS season =

Rahmatganj MFS 2022–23 football season

Rahmatganj MFS
2022–23 season
- Chairman: Haji Mohammad Salim
- Head coach: Kamal Babu
- Bangladesh Premier League: 9th of 11
- Federation Cup: Group stages
- Independence Cup: Group stages
- Top goalscorer: League: (Nigeria) Peter Ebimobowei (4 goals); All: (Brazil) Michael Vinícius (4 goals)
- Biggest win: 3–1 Vs BFF Elite Academy (24 November 2022)
- Biggest defeat: 1–4 Vs Bangladesh Police FC (16 November 2022)

The 2022–23 Rahmatganj MFS's season was the 90th competitive since its establishment in 1933 and its 13th season in the Bangladesh Premier League. In addition to domestic league, Rahmatganj MFS participated in the season's edition of Federation Cup and Independence Cup. The season covered the period from 9 December 2022 to 22 July 2023.

== Players ==
=== Current squad ===
As of 28 March 2023

Note: Flags indicate national team as defined under FIFA eligibility rules; some limited exceptions apply. Players may hold more than one non-FIFA nationality.

No.	Pos.	Nation	Player
1	GK	BAN	Mohamed Mitul Hossain
2	DF	BAN	Habibur Rahman Nolok
3	DF	BAN	Saddam Hossain Anny
4	DF	UZB	Shokhrukhbek Kholmatov
5	DF	BAN	Mohamed Tanvir Hossain
7	MF	BAN	Mohamed Shadhin
8	MF	BAN	Mohammad Abdullah
11	FW	BAN	Khondoker Ashraful Islam
12	MF	BAN	Enamul Islam Gazi
13	FW	BAN	Mohamed Iftekhar Munna
14	MF	BAN	Mehebub Nayan
15	MF	BAN	Akkas Ali
16	MF	BAN	Fazlay Rabbi
17	FW	BAN	Noyon Mia
18	MF	TJK	Fatkhullo Fatkhulloyev
19	DF	BAN	Mohamed Rajon Howleder
20	FW	BAN	Samim Yasir Juel
21	DF	BAN	Mohammad Al Amin
22	GK	BAN	Mohammed Mamun Alif
24	MF	BAN	Rofiqul Sumon Islam
25	MF	BAN	Kamal Hossain Titu
26	FW	BAN	Murad Hossain Chowdhury
27	MF	BAN	Zahidul Islam Babu
28	FW	BAN	Mohammed Fahim Nur Toha
29	MF	BAN	Mohamed Sayde
30	GK	BAN	Arman Hossain
32	MF	BAN	Didaynul Islam Sagor
45	FW	MLI	Ulysse Diallo
63	MF	UZB	Bunyod Shodiev
90	FW	NGR	Peter Ebimobowei

== Transfer ==
=== In ===
No.	Pos	Player	Previous club	Fee	Date	Source
	GK	(Bangladesh) Mitul Hossain	(Bangladesh) Saif Sporting Club	Free transfer	18 August 2022	
	DF	(Bangladesh) Tanvir Hossain	(Bangladesh) Saif Sporting Club	Free transfer	19 August 2022	
	MF	(Bangladesh) Md Sayde	(Bangladesh) Saif Sporting Club	Free transfer	20 August 2022	
	DF	(Bangladesh) Jalal Miya	(Bangladesh) Chittagong Abahani Limited	Free transfer	21 August 2022	
	DF	(Bangladesh) Saddam Anny	(Bangladesh) Saif Sporting Club	Free transfer	22 August 2022	
	MF	(Bangladesh) Nazmul Islam Rasel	(Bangladesh) Saif Sporting Club	Free transfer	23 August 2022	
	GK	(Bangladesh) Mamun Alif	(Bangladesh) Uttar Baridhara Club	Free transfer	23 August 2022	
	MF	(Bangladesh) Mohammad Abdullah	(Bangladesh) Sheikh Russel KC	Free transfer	26 August 2022	
–	FW	(Mali) Ulysse Diallo	(Lithuania) FK Panevėžys	Free transfer	15 March 2023	
–	FW	(Nigeria) Peter Ebimobowei	(Bangladesh) Chittagong Abahani	Free transfer	16 March 2023	
–	MF	(Uzbekistan) Bunyod Shodiev	(Uzbekistan) FK Yangiyer	Free transfer	16 March 2023	

=== Out ===
No.	Pos	Player	Moved to	Fee	Date	Source
2	DF	(Tajikistan) Siyovush Asrorov	(Tajikistan) FC Istiklol	Not disclosed	3 August 2022	
8	MF	(Bangladesh) Sanowar Hossain Lal	(Bangladesh) Dhaka Mohammedan	Not disclosed	9 August 2022	
22	GK	(Bangladesh) Rakibul Hasan Tushar	Bangladesh Police FC	Not disclosed	20 August 2022	

== Competitions ==
Win Draw Loss Fixtures

=== Overall ===
Competition	First match	Last match	Final Position
BPL	9 December 2022	22 July 2023	9th
Federation Cup	20 December 2022	2 May 2023	Group stages
Independence Cup	16 November 2022	24 November 2022	Group stages

=== Overview ===
Competition	Record							
Competition	Pld	W	D	L	GF	GA	GD	Win %
BPL	20	4	7	9	15	31	−16	20.00
Independence Cup	3	1	1	1	6	7	−1	33.33
Federation Cup	4	2	0	2	5	3	+2	50.00
Total	27	7	8	12	26	41	−15	25.93

Source: Competitions

=== Premier League ===
==== League table ====
Pos	Team	Pld	W	D	L	GF	GA	GD	Pts	Qualification or relegation
7	Fortis FC	20	5	8	7	23	25	−2	23	
8	Chittagong Abahani	20	4	9	7	26	35	−9	21	
9	Rahmatganj MFS	20	4	7	9	15	31	−16	19	
10	Muktijoddha Sangsad KC (R)	20	4	3	13	19	42	−23	15	Relegation to Championship League
11	AFC Uttara (R)	20	0	5	15	10	56	−46	5	Relegation to Championship League

Source: Soccerway
Rules for classification: 1) Points; 2) Goal difference; 3) Goals scored.
(R) Relegated

==== Results summary ====
Overall								Home						Away					
Pld	W	D	L	GF	GA	GD	Pts	W	D	L	GF	GA	GD	W	D	L	GF	GA	GD
20	4	7	9	15	31	−16	19	2	3	5	4	12	−8	2	4	4	11	19	−8

Source: Soccerway

==== Results by round ====
Round	1	2	3	4	5	6	7	8	9	10	11	12	13	14	15	16	17	18	19	20	21	22
Ground	A	H	A	H	A	(Note: No Rahmatganj MFS matchday in this round.)	H	A	H	A	H	H	A	H	A	H	(Note: No Rahmatganj MFS matchday in this round.)	A	H	A	H	A
Result	D	L	L	D	D	–	L	L	W	D	L	D	L	L	W	D	–	W	L	D	D	L
Position	4	7	9	8	8	8	9	9	8	8	9	9	9	9	9	9	9	8	9	9	9	9

Source: Matches
A = Away; H = Home; W = Win; D = Draw; L = Loss; P = Postponed

=== Matches ===
9 December 2022 1	Sheikh Jamal DC	2–2	Rahmatganj MFS	Gopalganj
14:30 BST (UTC+6)	Kawshik Barua 16'; Nodir Mavlonov (yellow card) 46'; Otabek Valizhonov 54' (yellow card) 76'	Report	Saddam Hossain Anny (yellow card) 6'; Noyon Mia (yellow card) 25'; Michael 54'; Mohamed Iftekhar Munna 63'	Stadium: Sheikh Fazlul Haque Mani Stadium; Referee: Bhubon Mohon Tarafder

24 December 2022 2	Rahmatganj MFS	1–2	Dhaka Abahani	Munshigonj
14:30 BST (UTC+6)	Nayon Mia (yellow card) 8' (yellow-red card) 63'; Fatkhullo (yellow card) 39'; Shokhrukhbek Kholmatov (yellow card) 44'; Michael 59'	Report	Colindres 12'; Sohel (red card) 45'; Maraz 72'	Stadium: Shaheed Bir Sreshtho Flight Lt. Matiur Rahman Stadium; Referee: Bituraj Barua

31 December 2022 3	Bashundhara Kings	2–0	Rahmatganj MFS	Dhaka
14:30 BST (UTC+6)	Dorielton 11'; Rakib (yellow card) 47'; Tutul (yellow card) 51'; Robinho 60'		Akkas Ali (yellow card) 43'; Jhoaho Hinestroza (yellow card) 51'; Mohamed Tanvir Hossain (yellow card) 88'; Shokhrukhbek Kholmatov (yellow card) 90+4'	Stadium: Bashundhara Kings Arena; Referee: Mohammed Nasiruddin

7 January 2023 4	Rahmatganj MFS	1–0	AFC Uttara	Munshigonj
14:45 BST (UTC+6)	Jhoaho Hinestroza 78'; Mohammed Al Amin (yellow card) 88'	Report	Zahidul Islam Babu (yellow card) 42'; Sakib Bepari (yellow card) 62'	Stadium: Shaheed Bir Sreshtho Flight Lt. Matiur Rahman Stadium; Referee: Sabuj Das

14 January 2023 5	Fortis FC	0–0	Rahmatganj MFS	Rajshahi
14:45 BST (UTC+6)	Mohamed Ariful Islam (yellow card) 81'	Report		Stadium: Muktijuddho Sriti Stadium; Referee: Bhubon Mohon Tarafder

27 January 2023 7	Rahmatganj MFS	0–2	Muktijoddha Sangsad KC	Munshigonj
15:00 BST (UTC+6)	Shokhrukhbek Kholmatov (yellow card) 16'; Mohamed Tanvir Hossain (yellow card) 79'	Report	Sajib 45+2'; Ndikumana 54'; Emmanuel (yellow card) 80'	Stadium: Shaheed Bir Sreshtho Flight Lt. Matiur Rahman Stadium; Referee: Mohammad Jalal Uddin

4 February 2023 8	Bangladesh Police FC	2–0	Rahmatganj MFS	Mymensingh
15:15 BST (UTC+6)	Almazbek Malikov (yellow card) 11' (goal) 22'; Mohammed Mithu Bhuiyan (yellow card) 48'; Mateo Palacios 72'	Report	Didaynul Islam Sagor (yellow card) 21'	Stadium: Rafiq Uddin Bhuiyan Stadium; Referee: Md Jalal Uddin

11 February 2023 9	Rahmatganj MFS	1–0	Chittagong Abahani	Munshigonj
15:45 BST (UTC+6)	Md Mitul Hossain (yellow card) 15'; Jhoaho Hinestroza (yellow card) 29'; Habibur Rahman Nolok (yellow card) 47'; Enamul 78'	Report	Nasiruddin (yellow card) 39'; Md Tarek (yellow card) 49'	Stadium: Shaheed Bir Sreshtho Flight Lt. Matiur Rahman Stadium; Referee: Mahmud Zamal Farouqee Nahid

18 February 2023 10	Sheikh Russel KC	1–1	Rahmatganj MFS	Dhaka
15:45 BST (UTC+6)	Mapuku 29'	Report	Shokhrukhbek; Kholmatov (yellow card) 26' (goal) 44'	Stadium: Bashundhara Kings Arena; Referee: Md Saymoon Hasan Sany

24 February 2023 11	Rahmatganj MFS	0–1	Dhaka Mohammedan	Munshigonj
15:45 BST (UTC+6)	Habibur Rahman Nolok (yellow card) 6'; Fathullo (yellow card) 34'; Mohamed Tanvir Hossain (yellow card) 90+4'	Report	Shahriar Emon 7'; Abid Hossain (yellow card) 43'; Roger (yellow card) 60'; Manik (yellow card) 84'; Muzaffar Muzaffarov (yellow card) 90+4'	Stadium: Shaheed Bir Sreshtho Flight Lt. Matiur Rahman Stadium; Referee: Md Nasiruddin

7 April 2023 12	Rahmatganj MFS	0–0	Sheikh Jamal DC	Munshigonj
15:45 BST (UTC+6)	Bunyod Shodiev (yellow card) 8'	Report	Mohammed Nurul Absar (yellow card) 33'	Stadium: Shaheed Bir Sreshtho Flight Lt. Matiur Rahman Stadium; Referee: Bituraj Barua

14 April 2023 13	Abahani Limited Dhaka	4–0	Rahmatganj MFS	Comilla
15:45 BST (UTC+6)	Colindres 17' (pen.), 79', 90+5'; Mehedi (yellow card) 19'; Peter (yellow card) 45+3'; Jibon 59'	Report		Stadium: Shaheed Dhirendranath Datta Stadium; Referee: Md Alamgir Sarkar

28 April 2023 14	Rahmatganj MFS	0–4	Bashundhara Kings	Munshigonj
15:45 BST (UTC+6)	Fatkhulloyev (yellow card) 58'; Mohamed Tanvir Hossain (yellow card) 80'	Report	Robinho (penalty missed) 6' 10'; Asror Gafurov 30'; Figueira 45', 90+1'	Stadium: Shaheed Bir Sreshtho Flight Lt. Matiur Rahman Stadium; Referee: Md Alamgir Sarkar

6 May 2023 15	AFC Uttara	2–3	Rahmatganj MFS	Mymensingh
16:00 BST (UTC+6)	Richard Maturana 24'; Sakib Bepari 54'	Report	Ebimobowei 32'; Diallo 55'; Samim Yasir Juel 73'	Stadium: Rafiq Uddin Bhuiyan Stadium; Referee: Bituraj Barua

13 May 2023 16	Rahmatganj MFS	1–1	Fortis FC	Munshigonj
16:00 BST (UTC+6)	Diallo 2'; Fatkhulloyev (yellow card) 64'; Khondoker Ashraful Islam (yellow card) 66'; Mohamed Tanvir Hossain (yellow card) 72'; Mohammed Mamun Alif (yellow card) 73'	Report	Gaira Joof 4' (pen.); Jaynal Abedin Dipu (yellow card) 84'	Stadium: Shaheed Bir Sreshtho Flight Lt. Matiur Rahman Stadium; Referee: Md Jashim Akhter

27 May 2023 18	Muktijoddha Sangsad KC	1–2	Rahmatganj MFS	Gopalganj
16:00 BST (UTC+6)	Emmanuel 37'	Report	Peter 26', 65' (pen.)	Stadium: Sheikh Fazlul Haque Mani Stadium; Referee: Bhubon Mohon Tarafder

3 June 2023 19	Rahmatganj MFS	0–2	Bangladesh Police FC	Munshigonj
16:00 BST (UTC+6)	Habibur Rahman Nolok (yellow card) 31'	Report	MS Bablu 4'; Arango 49'; Zillur Rahman (yellow card) 65'; Monaem (yellow card) 87'	Stadium: Shaheed Bir Sreshtho Flight Lt. Matiur Rahman Stadium; Referee: Md Nasiruddin

8 June 2023 20	Chittagong Abahani	2–2	Rahmatganj MFS	Munshigonj
16:00 BST (UTC+6)	Md Tarek (yellow card) 7'; Ekbal Hossain 63'; Ojukwu 65'	Report	Ebimobowei 56'; Anik Hossain 84'	Stadium: Shaheed Bir Sreshtho Flight Lt. Matiur Rahman Stadium; Referee: Md Anisur Rahman

15 July 2023 21	Rahmatganj MFS	0–0	Sheikh Russel KC	Munshigonj
16:00 BST (UTC+6)	Khondoker Ashraful Islam (yellow card) 63'	Report	Shawkat Russel (yellow card) 58'	Stadium: Shaheed Bir Sreshtho Flight Lt. Matiur Rahman Stadium; Referee: Md Nasiruddin

22 July 2023 22	Dhaka Mohammedan	3–1	Rahmatganj MFS	Comilla
16:00 BST (UTC+6)	Emmanuel 24'; Mehedi (yellow card) 45'; Arif Hossain 48'; Diabate 54'; Duarte (yellow card) 69'	Report	Bunyod Shodiev (yellow card) 56'; Mohammed Emon Hossain 90+2'	Stadium: Shaheed Dhirendranath Datta Stadium; Referee: Jashim Akhter

=== Federation Cup ===
==== Group stages ====
Pos	Team	Pld	W	D	L	GF	GA	GD	Pts	Qualification
1	Mohammedan SC	3	2	1	0	10	2	+8	7	Advance to knockout phase
2	Rahmatganj MFS	3	2	0	1	5	2	+3	6	Advance to knockout phase
3	Sheikh Jamal DC	3	1	1	1	5	5	0	4	Advance to knockout phase
4	AFC Uttara	3	0	0	3	1	12	−11	0	

Source: Footystats
Rules for classification: Group stage tiebreakers

20 December 2022	Dhaka Mohammedan	1–0	Rahmatganj MFS	Gopalganj
14:30 BST (UTC+6)	Diabate 75'	Report		Stadium: Sheikh Fazlul Haque Mani Stadium; Referee: Md Anisur Rahman Sagor

10 January 2023	Rahmatganj MFS	3–0	Sheikh Jamal DC	Munshigonj
14:45 BST (UTC+6)	Fatkhullo 16'; Michael 45+2' (yellow card) 76'; Jhoaho Hinestroza 76'	Report	Manaf Rabby (yellow card) 7'; Faysal Ahmed (yellow card) 89'	Stadium: Shaheed Bir Sreshtho Flight Lt. Matiur Rahman Stadium; Referee: Md Alamgir Sarkar

31 January 2023	AFC Uttara	1–2	Rahmatganj MFS	Cumilla
15:00 BST (UTC+6)	Rohit Sarkar 6'; Ashik Ahmed (yellow card) 18'; Arman Sadi (yellow card) 54'	Report	Jhoaho Hinestroza 71' (pen.); Khondoker Ashraful Islam 74'	Stadium: Shaheed Dhirendranath Datta Stadium; Referee: Rimon Mahmud

==== Knockout stages ====
2 May 2023 Quarter-finals	Sheikh Russel KC	1–0	Rahmatganj MFS	Munshigonj
15:15 BST (UTC+6)	Ikechukwu 13'; Abid Ahmed (yellow card) 58' (yellow-red card)	Report		Stadium: Shaheed Bir Sreshtho Flight Lt. Matiur Rahman Stadium; Referee: Md Anisur Rahman Sagor

=== Independence Cup ===
==== Group stages ====
Pos	Team	Pld	W	D	L	GF	GA	GD	Pts	Qualification
1	Police FC	3	2	1	0	9	5	+4	7	Advance to Knockout stage
2	Sheikh Jamal DC	3	1	1	1	8	6	+2	4	Advance to Knockout stage
3	Rahmatganj MFS	3	1	1	1	6	7	−1	4	
4	BFF Elite Academy	3	0	1	2	2	7	−5	1	

Source: GSA

16 November 2022	Rahmatganj MFS	1–4	Bangladesh Police FC	Munshigonj
14:00 BST (UTC+6)	Abdullah 84' (pen.)	Report	Joyonto 4'; Bablu 10', 16'; Faysal 88'	Stadium: Munshigonj District Stadium; Referee: Md Anisur Rahman Sagor

20 November 2022	Sheikh Jamal DC	2–2	Rahmatganj MFS	Comilla
13:00 BST (UTC+6)	Otabek 45+2'; Shakil 53'	Report	Fatkhulloyev 62'; Juel 69'	Stadium: Comilla District Stadium; Referee: Bituraj Barua

24 November 2022	Rahmatganj MFS	3–1	BFF Elite Academy	Munshigonj
13:00 BST (UTC+6)	Fatkhulloyev 38'; Michael 45+1'; Saddam 55'	Report	Asadul 77'	Stadium: Munshigonj District Stadium; Referee: Md Anisur Rahman Sagor

== Statistics ==
=== Goalscorers ===
Rank	Player	Position	Total	BPL	Independence Cup	Federation Cup
1	(Brazil) Michael Vinícius	FW	4	2	1	1
1	(Nigeria) Peter Ebimobowei	FW	4	4	0	0
2	(Tajikistan) Fatkhullo Fatkhulloyev	MF	3	0	2	1
2	(Colombia) Jhoaho Hinestroza	FW	3	1	0	2
3	(Bangladesh) Samin Yasir Juel	FW	2	1	1	0
3	(Mali) Ulysse Diallo	FW	2	2	0	0
4	(Bangladesh) Mohammed Emon Hossain	FW	1	1	0	0
4	(Bangladesh) Mohammad Abdullah	MF	1	0	1	0
4	(Bangladesh) Mohamed Iftekhar Munna	FW	1	1	0	0
4	(Bangladesh) Khondoker Ashraful Islam	FW	1	0	0	1
4	(Bangladesh) Saddam Anny	DF	1	0	1	0
4	(Bangladesh) Enamul Islam Gazi	MF	1	1	0	0
4	(Uzbekistan) Shokhrukhbek Kholmatov	DF	1	1	0	0
Own goal			1	1	0	0
Total			26	14	6	5

Source: Matches
