= 2024 SAFF U-20 Championship =

Tournament details
- Host country: Nepal
- Dates: 18–28 August 2024
- Teams: 6 (from 1 sub-confederation)
- Venue: 1 (in 1 host city)

Final positions
- Champions: Bangladesh (1st title)
- Runners-up: Nepal

Tournament statistics
- Matches played: 9
- Goals scored: 20 (2.22 per match)
- Attendance: 10,387 (1,154 per match)
- Top scorer(s): (Bangladesh) Mirajul Islam (4 goals)
- Best player: (Bangladesh) Mirajul Islam
- Best goalkeeper: (Bangladesh) Mohammad Asif
- Fair play award: Nepal

The 2024 SAFF U-20 Championship was the 6th edition of the SAFF U-20 Championship, an international football competition for men's under-20 national teams from South Asia region, organized by the South Asian Football Federation (SAFF). The tournament were played in Lalitpur, Nepal from 18 to 28 August 2024.

Bangladesh are the defending champions, who won their maiden title by defeating Nepal 4–1 goals in the final on 28 August 2024.

== Venue ==
The all matches were played at the ANFA Complex in Lalitpur, Nepal.

Lalitpur
ANFA Complex
Capacity: 6,000
2024 SAFF U-20 Championship

== Participants teams ==
The following six participants were participated in the tournament.

Legend

Did not participate

Team	Appearances in the SAFF U-20 Championship	Previous best performance
Bangladesh	6th	Runners-up (2017, 2019, 2022)
Bhutan	5th	Fourth place (2017, 2019)
India	6th	Champion (2019, 2022, 2023)
Maldives	6th	Third place (2019)
Nepal (Host)	6th	Champion (2015, 2017)
Pakistan		
Sri Lanka	3rd	Group stage (2019, 2022)

- Pakistan withdrew from the competition on 11 July 2024.

== Draw ==
The draw ceremony of the tournament was held at Hotel InterContinental, Dhaka, Bangladesh on 8 June 2024. The seven participants were divided into two groups, A consisting of four and B of three teams.

== Seedings ==
Pot 1	Pot 2	Pot 3	Pot 4
India Nepal (Host)	Maldives Bangladesh	Bhutan ~~Pakistan~~	Sri Lanka

Group A
Pos	Team
A1	Nepal
A2	Bangladesh
A3	~~Pakistan~~
A4	Sri Lanka

Group B
Pos	Team
B1	India
B2	Maldives
B3	Bhutan

== Schedule ==
Phase	Date
Group stage	18–23 August 2024
Semi-finals	25–26 August 2024
Final	28 August 2024

== Match officials ==
Referees

- (Bangladesh) Bituraj Barua
- (Bhutan) Ugyen Penjor
- (India) Senthil Nathan Sekaran
- (Maldives) Afsheen Naseer
- (Nepal) Shyamlal Danuwar
- (Sri Lanka) Mohamed Jafran Athambawa

Assistant referees

- (Bangladesh) Md Nuruzzaman
- (Bhutan) Hem Kumar Sunwar
- (India) Dipesh Manohar Sawant
- (Maldives) Raeef Rauf
- (Nepal) Sahadev Shrestha
- (Sri Lanka) Lahiru M. Jayaneththi

== Players eligibility ==
Players born on or after 1 January 2005 are eligible to compete in the tournament. Each team has to register a squad of minimum 16 and maximum 23 players.

== Group stage ==
- Times listed are UTC+05:45 Nepal Standard Time (NST).

Key to colours in group tables
Group winners and runners-up advance to the semi-finals

Tiebreakers

Teams are ranked according to points (3 points for a win, 1 point for a draw, 0 points for a loss), and if tied on points, the following tiebreaking criteria are applied, in the order given, to determine the rankings.

1. Points in head-to-head matches among tied teams;
2. Goal difference in head-to-head matches among tied teams;
3. Goals scored in head-to-head matches among tied teams;
4. If more than two teams are tied, and after applying all head-to-head criteria above, a subset of teams are still tied, all head-to-head criteria above are reapplied exclusively to this subset of teams;
5. Goal difference in all group matches;
6. Goals scored in all group matches;
7. Penalty shoot-out if only two teams are tied and they met in the last round of the group;
8. Disciplinary points (yellow card = 1 point, red card as a result of two yellow cards = 3 points, direct red card = 3 points, yellow card followed by direct red card = 4 points);
9. Drawing of lots.

=== Group A ===
Pos	Team	Pld	W	D	L	GF	GA	GD	Pts	Qualification
1	Nepal (H)	2	2	0	0	3	1	+2	6	Qualified for Knockout stage
2	Bangladesh	2	1	0	1	3	2	+1	3	Qualified for Knockout stage
3	Sri Lanka	2	0	0	2	0	3	−3	0	
4	Pakistan	0	0	0	0	0	0	0	0	Withdrew

Source: GSA
(H) Hosts
18 August 2024
15:00

Sri Lanka	0–1	Nepal
	Report	Nirajan Dhami 23'

ANFA Complex, Lalitpur
Attendance: 2,500
Referee: Ugyen Penjor (Bhutan)

20 August 2024
15:00

Bangladesh	2–0	Sri Lanka
Mirajul 17'; Nova 85'	Report

ANFA Complex, Lalitpur
Referee: Senthil Nathan Sekaran (India)

22 August 2024
15:00

Nepal	2–1	Bangladesh
Samir 17'; Nirajan Dhami 18'	Report	Mirajul 43' (pen.)

ANFA Complex, Lalitpur
Attendance: 483
Referee: Afsheen Naseer (Maldives)

=== Group B ===
Pos	Team	Pld	W	D	L	GF	GA	GD	Pts	Qualification
1	India	2	2	0	0	2	0	+2	6	Qualified for Knockout stage
2	Bhutan	2	1	0	1	2	2	0	3	Qualified for Knockout stage
3	Maldives	2	0	0	2	1	3	−2	0	

Source: GSA
19 August 2024
15:00

Bhutan	0–1	India
	Report	Monirul Molla 36'

ANFA Complex, Lalitpur
Attendance: 223
Referee: Shyamlal Danuwar (Nepal)

21 August 2024
15:00

Maldives	1–2	Bhutan
Ish Aafu Mohamed Firaq 54'	Report	Jetsuen Dorji 21'; Ngawang Chopel 90'

ANFA Complex, Lalitpur
Attendance: 73
Referee: Bituraj Barua (Bangladesh)

23 August 2024
15:00

India	1–0	Maldives
Manglenthang Kipgen 90+5'	Report

ANFA Complex, Lalitpur
Attendance: 440
Referee: Mohamed Jafran Athambawa (Sri Lanka)

== Knockout stage ==
- In the knockout stage, if a match finished goalless at the end of normal playing time, extra time would have been played (two periods of 15 minutes each) and followed, if necessary, by a penalty shoot-out to determine the winner.

=== Bracket ===
Semi-finals
25 August – Lalitpur
Nepal (p)	1 (4)
Bhutan	1 (1)
26 August – Lalitpur
India	1 (3)
Bangladesh (p)	1 (4)

Final
28 August – Lalitpur
Nepal	1
Bangladesh	4

=== Semi-finals ===
25 August 2024
15:00

Nepal	1–1	Bhutan
Nirajan Dhami 78'	Report	Jetsuen Dorji 56'
Penalties
Ram Thapa (penalty scored); Abinash Syangtan (penalty scored); Semanta Thapa (penalty scored); Jiyarat Shekh (penalty scored)	4–1	(penalty scored) Jetsuen Dorji; (penalty missed) Jigme Namgyel; (penalty missed) Ugyen Dorji

ANFA Complex, Lalitpur
Referee: Senthil Nathan Sekaran (India)

26 August 2024
15:00

India	1–1	Bangladesh
Rickey Meetei 75'	Report	Asadul Molla 36'
Penalties
Gangte (penalty missed); Pramveer (penalty scored); Gwgwmsar Goyary (penalty scored); Manjot Singh Parmar (penalty scored); Akash Tirkey (penalty missed)	3–4	(penalty scored) Nova; (penalty scored) Moin; (penalty scored) Topu; (penalty scored) Asif

ANFA Complex, Lalitpur
Attendance: 3,243
Referee: Shyamlal Danuwar (Nepal)

=== Final ===
28 August 2024
14:30

Nepal	1–4	Bangladesh
Samir 80'	Report	Mirajul 45+1', 55'; Rahul 71'; Nova 90+6'

ANFA Complex, Lalitpur
Attendance: 3,425
Referee: Mohamed Jafran Athambawa (Sri Lanka)

== Winner ==
6th SAFF U-20 Championship 2024 Champions

Bangladesh
First title

== Awards ==
The following awards were given at the conclusion of the tournament:

Fair Play Award	Best goalkeeper	Most valuable player
Nepal	(Bangladesh) Mohammad Asif	(Bangladesh) Mirajul Islam

== Statistics ==
=== Goalscorers ===
There have been 20 goals scored in 9 matches, for an average of 2.22 goals per match.

4 goals

- (Bangladesh) Mirajul Islam

3 goals

- (Nepal) Nirajan Dhami

2 goals

- (Bhutan) Jetsuen Dorji
- (Nepal) Samir Tamang
- (Bangladesh) Piash Ahmed Nova

1 goal

- (Bangladesh) Asadul Molla
- (Bangladesh) Md Rabby Hossen Rahul
- (Bhutan) Ngawang Chope
- (India) Rickey Meetei
- (India) Monirul Molla
- (India) Manglenthang Kipgen
- (Maldives) Ish Aafu Mohamed Firaq

Source: GSA

== See also ==
- 2024 SAFF U-17 Championship
- 2024 SAFF Women's Championship
- 2024 SAFF U-16 Women's Championship
- 2024 SAFF U-19 Women's Championship
