= 2017 SAFF U-15 Championship =

Tournament details
- Host country: Nepal
- Dates: 18–27 August
- Teams: 6 (from 1 confederation)
- Venues: 2 (in Lalitpur and Kathmandu host cities)

Final positions
- Champions: India (2nd title)
- Runners-up: Nepal
- Third place: Bangladesh
- Fourth place: Bhutan

Tournament statistics
- Matches played: 10
- Goals scored: 51 (5.1 per match)
- Attendance: 23,053 (2,305 per match)
- Top scorer: (Bangladesh) Foysal Ahmed Fahim (6 goals)
- Best player: (India) Vikram Pratap Singh
- Fair play award: Bangladesh
- All statistics correct as of 30 March 2019.

The 2017 SAFF U-15 Championship was the fourth edition of the SAFF U-15 Championship, an international football competition for men's under-15 national teams organized by SAFF. Since most teams use to send their U-15 team keeping in mind 2018 AFC U-16 Championship qualification it has been officially changed to U-15 tournament. The tournament was hosted by Nepal from 18 to 27 of August, 2017 at ANFA Complex, Satdobato and Halchowk Stadium. Six teams from the region took part, divided into two groups.

== Host selection ==
On July 10, 2017, a tournament draw ceremony was held in the conference room of the Bangladesh Football Federation. SAFF general secretary Anwarul Haque Helal and BFF general secretary Abu Nayeem Shohag were among those present.

== Eligible teams ==
- Bangladesh
- Bhutan
- India
- Nepal (Host)
- Sri Lanka
- Maldives

== Player eligibility ==
Players born on or after 1 January 2002 were eligible to compete in the tournament.

== Participating teams ==
Team	Appearances in the SAFF U-15 Championship	Previous best performance
Bangladesh	4th	Champions (2015)
Bhutan	2nd	Group Stage
India	4th	Champions (2013,2017)
Maldives	3rd	Group Stage
Nepal (Host)	4th	Runners-up (2013)
Sri Lanka	4th	Group Stage

== Venues ==
Lalitpur	Kathmandu
ANFA Complex, Satdobato	Halchowk Stadium
Capacity: 6,000	Capacity: 3,500

== Match officials ==
Referees

- (Nepal) Kabin Byanjankar
- (Bangladesh) Golam Mourshed Choidhary
- (Maldives) Abdulla Shathir
- (Sri Lanka) D.D.Indika Sendanayake
- (India) Tanmoy Dhar
- (Bhutan) Ugyen Dorji

Assistant referees

- (Nepal) Nani Ram Thapa
- (India) Kuldeep Tariyal
- (Bangladesh) Md Shafikul Islam
- (Sri Lanka) K.L.S.Chathuranga
- (Maldives) Abdulla Suneed
- (Bhutan) Phurpa Wangchuk

== Group stage ==
- All matches were played in Lalitpur, Nepal.
- Times listed are UTC+05:45.

Key to colours in group tables
Group winners and runners-up advance to the semi-finals

=== Group A ===
Pos	Team	Pld	W	D	L	GF	GA	GD	Pts	Status
1	Bangladesh	2	2	0	0	7	0	+7	6	Qualified for Knockout stage
2	Bhutan	2	1	0	1	6	3	+3	3	Qualified for Knockout stage
3	Sri Lanka	2	0	0	2	0	10	−10	0	

Source: GoalNepal

18 August 2017
15:00 UTC+5:45

Bangladesh	4–0	Sri Lanka
Foysal Ahmed Fahim 28', 32', 74' (pen.); Nazmul Biswas 44'	Report

ANFA Complex, Satdobato
Attendance: 1,794
Referee: Kabin Byanjankar (Nepal)

20 August 2017
15:00 UTC+5:45

Bhutan	6–0	Sri Lanka
Khando 8', 24'; Kinga Wangchuk 30'; Kelzang Jigmi 43', 45+1'; Siddharth Gurung 90'	Report

ANFA Complex, Satdobato
Attendance: 1,105
Referee: Abdulla Shathir (Maldives)

22 August 2017
15:00 UTC+5:45

Bangladesh	3–0	Bhutan
Foysal Ahmed Fahim 25'; Miraj Molla 52', 81'	Report

ANFA Complex, Satdobato
Attendance: 1,631
Referee: Tanmoy Dhar (India)

=== Group B ===
Pos	Team	Pld	W	D	L	GF	GA	GD	Pts	Status
1	India	2	2	0	0	11	1	+10	6	Qualified for Knockout stage
2	Nepal (H)	2	1	0	1	7	2	+5	3	Qualified for Knockout stage
3	Maldives	2	0	0	2	0	15	−15	0	

Source: GoalNepal
(H) Hosts

19 August 2017
15:00 UTC+5:45

India	9–0	Maldives
Ravi Bahadur Rana 20', 26', 48'; Ibrahim Anoof 22', 89' (o.g.); Thoiba Singh Moirangthem 41'; Vikram Pratap Singh 70'; Ricky Shabong 57'; Lalrokima 80'	Report

ANFA Complex, Satdobato
Attendance: 1,481
Referee: Golam Mourshed Choudhary (Bangladesh)

21 August 2017
15:00 UTC+5:45

Nepal	6–0	Maldives
Brijesh Chaudhary 14', 73'; Darshan Gurung 22'; Roshan Rana Magar 38' (pen.); Akash Budha 45+1', 47'	Report

ANFA Complex, Satdobato
Attendance: 2,706
Referee: D.D.Indika Sendanayake (Sri Lanka)

23 August 2017
15:00 UTC+5:45

Nepal	1–2	India
Roshan Rana Magar 40' (pen.)	Report	27' Vikram Pratap Singh; 64' Ravi Bahadur Rana

ANFA Complex, Satdobato
Attendance: 2,018
Referee: Ugyen Dorji (Bhutan)

== Bracket ==
Semi-finals
25 August – ANFA Complex
Bangladesh	2
Nepal	4
25 August – Halchowk Stadium
India	3
Bhutan	0

Final
27 August – ANFA Complex
Nepal	1
India	2
Third Place
27 August – Halchowk Stadium
Bangladesh	8
Bhutan	0

== Knockout stage ==
=== Semi-finals ===
25 August 2017
15:00 UTC+5:45

Bangladesh	2–4	Nepal
Foysal Ahmed Fahim 72'; 73' Habibur Rahman	Report	5', 64' Aakash Budha Magar; 64' (o.g.) Nazmul Biswas; 90+6' Brijesh Choudhary

ANFA Complex, Satdobato
Attendance: 2,865
Referee: D.D. Indika Sendanayake (Sri Lanka)

25 August 2017
15:00 UTC+5:45

India	3–0	Bhutan
Vikram Pratap Singh 20'; Harpreet Singh 76'; Ridge Melvin D'Mello 90+2'	Report

Halchowk Stadium, Kathmandu
Attendance: 2,346
Referee: Golam Mourshed Choudhary (Bangladesh)

=== Third place ===
27 August 2017
14:00

Bangladesh	8–0	Bhutan
Foysal Ahmed Fahim 18'; Raja Sheikh 20', 46'; Miraj Molla 29', 58'; Md Akash 69'; Yeasin Arafat 79'; Arif Hossen 90'	Report

Halchowk Stadium, Kathmandu
Attendance: 2,017
Referee: Abdulla Suneed (Maldives)

=== Final ===
27 August 2017
15:00

Nepal	1–2	India
Birjesh Chaudhary 41' (pen.)	Report	59' Lalrokima; 75' Vikram Pratap Singh

ANFA Complex, Satdobato
Attendance: 5,000
Referee: Golam Mourshed Choudhary (Bangladesh)

== Winner ==
2017 SAFF U-15 Championship

India
Second title

== Awards ==
The following awards were given for the 2017 SAFF U-15 Championship.

FIFA Fair Play Award	Player of the Tournament	Golden Boot Award
Bangladesh	(India) Vikram Pratap Singh	(Bangladesh) Foysal Ahmed Fahim

== Goalscorers ==
6 Goals

- (Bangladesh) Foysal Ahmed Fahim

5 Goals

- (India) Vikram Pratap Singh

4 Goals

- (Nepal) Akash Budha Magar
- (Nepal) Brijesh Chaudhary
- (Bangladesh) Miraj Molla

3 Goals

- (India) Ravi Bahadur Rana

2 Goals

- (Bhutan) Dorji Khando
- (Bhutan) Kelzang Jigmi
- (Nepal) Roshan Rana Magar
- (India) Lalrokima
- (Bangladesh) Raja Sheikh

1 Goal

- (Bangladesh) Nazmul Biswas
- (Bangladesh) Habibur Rahman
- (India) Thoiba Singh Moirangthem
- (India) Ricky Shabong
- (Bhutan) Kinga Wangchuk
- (Bhutan) Siddharth Gurung
- (Nepal) Darshan Gurung
- (India) Harpreet Singh
- (India) Ridge Melvin D'Mello
- (Bangladesh) Md Akash
- (Bangladesh) Yeasin Arafat
- (Bangladesh) Arif Hossen

2 Own Goals

- (Maldives) Ibrahim Anoof (playing against India)

Own Goal

- (Bangladesh) Nazmul Biswas (playing against Nepal)
