= Mannaf Rabby =

Bangladeshi footballer

Personal information
- Full name: Mannaf Rabby
- Date of birth: 6 June 1997 (age 29)
- Place of birth: Jessore, Bangladesh
- Position: Winger

Team information
- Current team: Dhaka Wanderers
- Number: 9

Youth career
- 2011–2012: Shams Ul Huda FA

Senior career*
Years	Team	Apps	(Gls)
2012–2013	Fakirerpool		
2014–2015	Agrani Bank		(6)
2015–2016	Rahmatganj		(5)
2016–2017	Brothers Union		(4)
2017–2018	Chittagong Abahani	5	(0)
2018–2019	Brothers Union	20	(8)
2019–2021	Chittagong Abahani	24	(3)
2021–2022	Sheikh Russel	21	(3)
2022–2023	Sheikh Jamal	14	(2)
2023–2024	Chittagong Abahani	16	(3)
2024–2025	Bangladesh Police	14	(0)
2025–2026	Brothers Union	3	(0)
2026–	Dhaka Wanderers	0	(0)

International career
2015	Bangladesh U20	6	(2)
- * Club domestic league appearances and goals as of 12 December 2025

Mannaf Rabby (Bengali: মান্নাফ রাবি; born 6 June 1997) is a Bangladeshi professional footballer who plays as a winger for Bangladesh Football League club Dhaka Wanderers.

== Early career ==
Having begun his career at Shams Ul Huda Football Academy in his hometown Jessore, Rabby joined Fakirerpool Young Men's Club in the Dhaka Senior Division League in 2012.

== Club career ==
=== Agrani Bank SC ===
Rabby scored 6 goals from about 12 games for Agrani Bank SC in the 2012 Bangladesh Championship League.

=== Rahmatganj MFS ===
On 8 April 2015, Rabby scored a stoppage time equaliser for Rahmatganj MFS in a 2–2 draw with Abahani Limited Dhaka during his Bangladesh Football League debut. He found the net 5 times in his first year playing top-flight football.

=== Brothers Union ===
Rabby was the third highest local scorer in the 2018–19 league season with 8 goals for Brothers Union, however, he was not called up to the national team by the head coach at the time, Jamie Day.

=== Sheikh Russel KC ===
On 27 November 2021, Rabby scored in his debut to guide Sheikh Russel KC to an opening day victory over Uttar Baridhara Club in the 2021 Independence Cup.

== International career ==
Rabby represented the Bangladesh U19 team during both the 2015 SAFF U-19 Championship and 2016 AFC U-19 Championship qualifiers.

In 2016, Lodewijk de Kruif named Rabby in the 32-man Bangladesh national team preliminary squad for the 2019 AFC Asian Cup qualification – play-off round, however, he failed to make the final team before the qualifiers.
