= 2021–22 Saif Sporting Club season =

Saif Sporting Club
2021–22 season
- Owner: Saif Powertec Limited
- Head coach: Andrés Cruciani
- Stadium: Munshigonj District Stadium
- Bangladesh Premier League: 3rd of 12
- Independence Cup: Semi-finals
- Federation Cup: Semi-finals
- Top goalscorer: League: Emeka Ogbugh (12 goals); All: Emeka Ogbugh (14 goals)
- Biggest win: 7–0 Vs Uttar Baridhara Club (26 July 2022)
- Biggest defeat: 3–4 Vs Bashundhara Kings (16 March 2022)
Home colours	Away colours

The 2021–22 season was Saif SC's 6th season since its establishment in 2016 and their 5th consecutive season in the Bangladesh Premier League after being promoted in 2017. The season covers the period from 1 October 2021 to 31 July 2022.

== Season summary ==
=== October ===
On 11 October 2021, Nigerian forward Kenneth Ikechukwu left the club for Indian club Churchill Brothers.

On 17 October 2021, the club signed Rwandan defender Emery Bayisenge from his countryside club AS Kigali.

On 18 October 2021, the club signed Nihat Jaman Ucchash on free transfer from Arambagh KS.

On 20 October 2021, forward Yeasin Arafat left the club for Bashundhara Kings.

On 22 October 2021, the club confirmed signing Bangladesh Police FC midfielder Nazmul Islam Rasel on a free transfer.

=== November ===
On 6 November 2021, Argentine Andres Cruciani was appointed as head coach for the upcoming season.

On 7 November 2021, Nigerian forward Mfon Udoh signed from Nigerian top division club Akwa United to Saif SC.

On 28 November 2021, Saif Sporting Club started their 2021-22 football season by defeating 2–1 goals Bangladesh Army. A goal from Nigerian forward Emeka Ogbugh and 1 own goal from Bangladesh Army defender Mehedi Hasan Mithu ensured the victory in the match.

=== December ===
On December 2nd, Saif Sporting Club defeated 3–2 goals Muktijoddha Sangsad KC. In 17 minutes goal by Foysal Ahmed Fahim and Nasirul Islam in 40 minutes finished 2-0 half time scored. In the second half 81 minutes third goals by Sazzad Hossain make score line 3-0 but in the 85, 90 minutes two goals by Tetsuaki Misawi finished the game 3–2.

On December 6th, Saif Sporting drew against Dhaka Mohammedan 1–1 goals. In the 45 minutes first half Saif forward Mfon Udoh goal took lead. In second half 90+1 minutes Mohammedan SC defender Rajib Hossain goal level the scored. Two win one draw with 7 points Saif SC through to the Knockout stage.

On December 10th, Saif Sporting Club defeated Swadhinata KS by 2–0 goals in their second Semi-finals. First half and second half both teams players played tough football but they won't found goal. End of 90 minutes goalless referee add 30 minutes first minute of extra time on 91 minutes Maraz Hossain goal took lead Saif Sporting Club and second one on 99 minutes by Foysal Ahmed Fahim. As a result, this match Saif Sporting Club reached Semi-final.

On 14 December, Saif Sporting Club defeated to Dhaka Abahani by 0–2 goals. On 25 minutes Nabib Newaj Jibon scored for Dhaka Abahani and with a goal finished first half. In the second half 81 minutes goal by Daniel Colindres made it 2–0. Saif Sporting Club exited from the tournament.

On 26 December, Saif SC 1–1 draw versus Bangladesh Police FC. On 55 minutes Saif defender Emery Bayisenge penalty goal took lead Saif SC but in the additional time 90+2 minutes goals by Police FC Amredin Sharifi draw the match and both teams share point.

On 30 December, Saif Sporting Club won 2–1 goals against Chittagong Abahani. Goals on 34 minutes Maraz Hosain and 38 Uzbekistan forward Asor Gafurov SSC end first half. In the second half 81 minutes Chittagong Abahani Shakhawat Hossain Rony scored a goal but isn't enough to avoid lost the match.

=== January ===
On 2 January, Saif Sporting club won by 2–0 against Swadhinata KS. On 40 minutes of first half Rahim Uddin open account for Saif SC before break of half time. In the second half 71 minutes Maraz Hossain made the scored 2–0 and Saif SC with 3 points qualified to Semi-finals.

On 6 January, Saif Sporting Club lost 3(3)–3(4) penalties shoot out against Dhaka Abahani. On 10 minutes first half Raphael Augusto gave lead Dhaka Abahani but Mfon Udoh equalized score on 19 minutes and finished half time 1–1. In the second half 74 minutes Emeka Ogbugh made score 2–1 until 90 minutes and Saif about to through the final but on 90+3 minutes Daniel Colindres goal level the score 2–2. In the extra time 90+4 minutes Rakib Hossain goal again Abahani took lead but on 120+3 minutes Saif SC Sazzad Hossain draw the scoreline 3–3. In the penalties shoot out Dhaka Abahani won 4–3 and through to the Final.

=== February ===
On 4 February, Saif Sporting Club had their season's first home match against Bangladesh Police FC and won by 1–0 goal. Both team in the first half played goalless. In the second half regulations times ended 0–0 but in the additional time on 90+2 minutes Saif SC Rwandian defender Emery Bayisenge goal gave them 3 points and left the field with victory.

On 9 February, Saif Sporting Club had their away game versus Rahmatganj MFS and lost 3–1. In the first half on 16 minutes a goal by Foysal Ahmed Fahim and on 40 minutes a goal by Nigerian Emeka Ogbugh took lead before ended of half time. In the second half on 66 minutes a goal by Maraz Hossain Saif SC made the scoreline 0–3. After conceded 3 goals Rahmatganj MFS playing attacking football and on 71 minutes a goal scored by Rahmatganj MFS Nigerian forward Sunday Chizoba made score 1–3 until finished the game.

On 13 February, Saif Sporting Club lost by 0–1 goal at home against Sheikh Russel KC. In the first half on 39 minutes a penalty goal by defender Aizar Akmatov took lead and finished half time. In the second half Sheikh Russel KC tried to extended the lead but Saif Sports Club also tried to equalized score but they won't able to do it. Sheikh Russel KC have left the field with full three points.

On 17 February, Saif Sporting Club have lost home game 0–2 against Dhaka Mohammedan. In the first half on 32 minutes a goal by Souleymane Diabate took the lead Dhaka Mohammedan and hold the lead till end first halftime. In the second half in between 4 minutes a goal by Md Shahriar Emon Dhaka Mohammdan extended the lead 2–0. Rest of the time of second half Saif Sporting Club didn't able to score any goal and Dhaka Mohammdan got three points.

On 24 February, Saif Sporting Club drew 3–3 goals against Chittagong Abahani at home match. In the first half on 5 minutes Sazzad Hossain goal take early lead Saif Sporting Club and in the added time of first half on 45+3 Peter Ebimobowei goal equalized score 1–1. In the second half on 58 minutes penalty goal by Emeka Ogbugh took lead again with score 2–1 but on 67 minutes goal by Chittgong Abahani Peter Ebimobowei leveled the score 2–2. On the 80 minutes second penalty goal by Emeka Ogbugh made scoreline 3–2 but Saif SC couldn't hold the lead till end the match because of Peter Ebimobowei third goal of the match ended match 3–3.

=== March ===
On 1 March, Saif Sporting Club defeated 5–1 goals Swadhinata KS in the away game.

On 16 March, Saif Sporting Club defeated to Bashundhara Kings by 3–4 goals in the away game.

=== April ===
On 3 April, Saif Sporting Club won by 3–0 goals against Uttar Baridhara Club at home ground. In the first half on 12 minutes Mfon Udoh goal took lead Saif Sporting Club and before last whistle of halftime on 45+1 minutes goal by Asor Gafurov extended it to 2–0. In the second half on 67 Sazzad Hossain Shakil goals made score 3–0 goals. On 87 minutes shown red card Saif Sporting Club Nasirul Islam Nasir and Yassan Kochnov of Uttar Baridhara Club. Both teams rest of the time played with ten men's squad.

On 8 April, Saif Sporting Club drew against Muktijoddha Sangsad KC by 3–3 in the away game.

On 21 April, Saif Sporting Club appointed Sheikh Maruf Hasan their new managing director. Sheikh Maruf Hasan is a former BFF counselor and competitor and also a police officer.

On 29 April, Saif Sporting Club beat Rahmatganj MFS with score 4–2 at home venue.

=== May ===
On 7 May, Saif Sporting Club have won by 1–0 goal against Sheikh Russel KC in the away game.

On 12 May, Saif Sporting Club have won against Dhaka Mohammedan with score 1–3 at home.

=== June ===
On 23 June, Saif Sporting Club have won against Chittagong Abahani by 4–3 goals in the away game.

On 28 June, Saif Sporting Club have lost by 1–2 goals against Swadhinata KS at home ground.

=== July ===
On 3 July, Saif Sporting Club have won by 4–2 goals versus Dhaka Abahani at home ground.

On 8 July, Saif Sporting Club have drawn against Sheikh Jamal DC by 2–2 goals in the away game.

On 18 July, Saif Sporting Club have lost against Bashundhara Kings by 0–2 goals at home venue.

On 26 July, Saif Sporting Club have won versus Uttar Baridhara Club by 7–0 goals in the away game.

On 31 July, Saif Sporting Club have lost against Muktijoddha Sangsad KC by 2–3 goals at home ground.

== Current squad ==
Saif Sporting Club Limited squad for 2021–22 season.

As of 6 January 2022

Note: Flags indicate national team as defined under FIFA eligibility rules; some limited exceptions apply. Players may hold more than one non-FIFA nationality.

No.	Pos.	Nation	Player
1	GK	BAN	Pappu Hossain
2	DF	BAN	Nasirul Islam Nasir
3	DF	BAN	Saddam Anny
4	DF	BAN	Monjurur Rahman Manik
5	DF	BAN	Riyadul Hasan Rafi (Vice-captain)
6	MF	BAN	Jamal Bhuyan (Captain)
7	MF	BAN	Rahim Uddin
8	DF	RWA	Emery Bayisenge
9	FW	NGR	Mfon Udoh
10	FW	NGR	Emeka Ogbugh
11	MF	BAN	Jamir Uddin
12	MF	BAN	Sazzad Hossain
14	MF	BAN	Samuel Elhaz Hudson
15	MF	BAN	Nazmul Islam Rasel
17	FW	BAN	Foysal Ahmed Fahim
18	MF	BAN	Taj Uddin

No.	Pos.	Nation	Player
19	FW	BAN	Kawser Ali Rabbi
20	FW	BAN	Maraz Hossain Opi
21	DF	BAN	Imran Hasan Rimon
22	GK	BAN	Shanto Kumar Ray
26	DF	BAN	MD Ganto
27	GK	BAN	Monirul Islam
28	MF	BAN	MD Sayde
31	FW	BAN	Mitul Hossain
33	GK	BAN	Abid Ahmed
34	MF	BAN	Jayed Ahmed
41	DF	BAN	Tanvir Hossain
44	DF	BAN	Sabuz Hossain
55	DF	BAN	Sobug Chandra Das
77	MF	UZB	Asror Gafurov
88	MF	BAN	Nayan Miah
99	MF	BAN	Nihat Jaman Ucchash

== Pre-season and friendlies ==
Win Draw Loss Fixtures

18 November 2021 Friendly	Uttar Baridhara Club	0–2	Saif Sporting Club	Dhaka
14:00		Report	Asror Gafurov 23' Rahim Uddin 58'	Stadium: Saif Sporting Club Practice Ground

23 November 2021	Muktijoddha Sangsad KC	0–1	Saif Sporting Club	Dhanmondi
14:00 UTC+6			Udoh 76'	Stadium: Dhanmondi Football Ground

24 January 2022	Dhaka Mohammedan	2–0	Saif Sporting Club	Dhaka
13:30 UTC+6	Nurat 16'; Diabate 23'			Stadium: Fortis Football Ground

== Transfer ==
=== Out ===
No.	Pos	Player	Transferred To	Fee	Date	Source
32	FW	(Nigeria) Kenneth Ikechukwu	(India) Churchill Brothers	Free transfer	11 October 2021	
2	DF	(Bangladesh) Yeasin Arafat	(Bangladesh) Bashundhara Kings	Free transfer	20 October 2021	

=== In ===
No.	Pos	Player	Previous club	Fee	Date	Source
8	DF	(Rwanda) Emery Bayisenge	(Rwanda) AS Kigali FC	Free transfer	17 October 2021	
71	FW	(Bangladesh) Nihat Jaman Uchhash	(Bangladesh) Arambagh KS	Free transfer	18 October 2021	
6	MF	(Bangladesh) Nazmul Islam Rasel	Bangladesh Police FC	Free transfer	22 October 2021	
30	FW	(Nigeria) Mfon Udoh	(Nigeria) Akwa United	Free transfer	7 November 2021	
77	MF	(Uzbekistan) Asror Gafurov	(Uzbekistan) Surkhon Termez	Free transfer	8 November 2021	
26	FW	(Nigeria) Emeka Ogbugh	(Morocco) MC Oujda	Free transfer	8 November 2021	
	CB	(England) Samuel Hudson	(England) Shildon AFC	Not Disclosed	20 April 2022	

== Competitions ==
Win Draw Loss Fixtures

=== Overall ===
Competition	First match	Last match	Final Position
Independence Cup	28 November 2021	14 December 2021	Semi-finals
Federation Cup	26 December 2021	6 January 2022	Semi-finals
BPL	4 February 2022	31 July 2022	3rd of 12

=== Overview ===
Competition	Record							
Competition	Pld	W	D	L	GF	GA	GD	Win %
Independence Cup	5	3	1	1	8	6	+2	60.00
Federation Cup	4	2	1	1	8	5	+3	50.00
BPL	22	10	4	8	58	37	+21	45.45
Total	31	15	6	10	74	48	+26	48.39

Source: Competitions

=== Independence Cup ===
==== Group C ====
Pos	Team	Pld	W	D	L	GF	GA	GD	Pts	Status
1	Saif Sporting Club	3	2	1	0	6	4	+2	7	Qualified for Knockout stage
2	Bangladesh Army	3	1	1	1	4	4	0	4	Qualified for Knockout stage
3	Dhaka Mohammedan	3	1	1	1	4	4	0	4	
4	Muktijoddha Sangsad KC	3	0	1	2	4	6	−2	1	

Source: Global Sports Archive
Rules for classification: Group stage tiebreakers

28 November 2021	Saif Sporting Club	2–1	Bangladesh Army	Dhaka
18:00 BST (UTC+6)	Emeka 49'; Mehedi 80' (o.g.)	Report	Mehedi 43' (pen.)	Stadium: BSSS Mostafa Kamal Stadium

2 December 2021	Muktijoddha Sangsad KC	2–3	Saif Sporting Club	Dhaka
16:00 BST (UTC+6)	Tetsuaki 85', 90'	Report	Fahim 17'; Nasirul 40'; Sazzad 81'	Stadium: BSSS Mostafa Kamal Stadium; Referee: Md Mizanur Rahman

6 December 2021	Saif Sporting Club	1–1	Mohammedan SC	Dhaka
18:00 BST (UTC+6)	Udoh 45'	Report	Rajib 90+1'	Stadium: BSSS Mostafa Kamal Stadium; Referee: GM Chowdhury Nayon

==== Knockout stage ====
10 December 2021 Quarter-finals	Saif Sporting Club	2–0	Swadhinata KS	Dhaka
20:00 BST (UTC+6)	Maraz 91'; Fahim 99'	Report		Stadium: BSSS Mostafa Kamal Stadium; Referee: Md Alamgir

14 December 2021 Semi-finals	Dhaka Abahani	2–0	Saif Sporting Club	Dhaka
17:15 BST (UTC+6)	Colindres 25'; Jion 81'	Report		Stadium: BSSS Mostafa Kamal Stadium; Referee: Md Mizanur Rahman

=== Federation Cup ===
==== Group C ====
Pos	Team	Pld	W	D	L	GF	GA	GD	Pts	Status
1	Saif Sporting Club	2	1	1	0	3	2	+1	4	Advance to Knockout stage
2	Chittagong Abahani	2	1	0	1	3	2	+1	3	Advance to Knockout stage
3	Bangladesh Police FC	2	0	1	1	1	3	−2	1	

Source: Soccerway
Rules for classification: Group stage tiebreakers

26 December 2022	Bangladesh Police FC	1–1	Saif Sporting Club	Dhaka
16:00 BST (UTC+6)	Sharifi 90+2'	Report	Emery	Stadium: BSSS Mostafa Kamal Stadium; Referee: Saymoon Hasan Sany

30 December 2022	Chittagong Abahani	1–2	Saif Sporting Club	Dhaka
18:45 BST (UTC+6)	Rony 81'	Report	Maraz 34'; Gafurov 38'	Stadium: BSSS Mostafa Kamal Stadium; Referee: Bituraj Borua

==== Knockout stage ====
2 January 2022 Quarter-finals	Saif Sporting Club	2–0	Swadhinata KS	Dhaka
19:30 BST (UTC+6)	Rahim 40'; Maraz 71'	Report		Stadium: BSSS Mostafa Kamal Stadium; Referee: Mohammed Jalaluddin

6 January 2022 Semi-finals	Saif Sporting Club	3–3 (3–4 p)	Dhaka Abahani	Dhaka
16:30 BST (UTC+6)	Mfon 19'; Ogbugh 74' (pen.); Sazzad 120+3'	Report	Raphael 10' (pen.); Colindres 90+3'; Rakib 94'	Stadium: BSSS Mostafa Kamal Stadium; Referee: Md Saymoon Hasan Sany
	Penalties
	Bayisenge (penalty scored); Udoh (penalty missed); Sazzad (penalty scored); Fahim (penalty scored); Jamal (penalty missed)		Milad (penalty scored); Rezaul (penalty scored); Mehedi (penalty scored); Mamun (penalty missed); Raphael (penalty scored)

=== Premier League ===
==== League table ====
Pos	Team	Pld	W	D	L	GF	GA	GD	Pts	Qualification or relegation
1	Bashundhara Kings (C, Q)	22	18	3	1	53	21	+32	57	Qualification for 2023 AFC Champions League Play-off round or 2023 AFC Cup Group Stage
2	Dhaka Abahani (Q)	22	14	5	3	55	31	+24	47	Qualification for 2023 AFC Cup Play-off round
3	Saif Sporting Club	22	11	4	7	58	37	+21	37	
4	Sheikh Jamal DC	22	9	8	5	34	31	+3	35	
5	Dhaka Mohammedan	22	8	9	5	39	26	+13	33	

Source: Soccerway
Rules for classification: 1) Points; 2) Goal difference; 3) Goals scored.
(C) Champions; (Q) Qualify for the AFC competition

==== Results summary ====
Overall								Home						Away					
Pld	W	D	L	GF	GA	GD	Pts	W	D	L	GF	GA	GD	W	D	L	GF	GA	GD
22	11	4	7	58	37	+21	37	4	2	4	20	17	+3	7	2	3	38	20	+18

Source: Soccerway

==== Results by round ====
Round	1	2	3	4	5	6	7	8	9	10	11	12	13	14	15	16	17	18	19	20	21	22
Ground	H	A	H	H	H	A	A	H	A	H	A	A	H	A	A	A	H	H	A	H	A	H
Result	W	W	L	L	D	W	L	D	L	W	D	W	W	W	W	W	L	W	D	L	W	L
Position	5	2	3	6	6	5	6	6	7	6	7	5	5	5	4	3	3	3	3	3	3	3

Source: Matches
A = Away; H = Home; W = Win; D = Draw; L = Loss; P = Postponed

=== Matches ===
3 February 2022 1	Saif Sporting Club	1–0	Bangladesh Police FC	Munshigonj
15:00 BST (UTC+6)	Maraz (yellow card) 71'; E. Bayisenge 90+2'	Report		Stadium: Munshigonj District Stadium; Referee: Md Mizanur Rahman

9 February 2022 2	Rahmatganj MFS	1–3	Saif Sporting Club	Munshigonj
15:00 BST (UTC+6)	Tarek (yellow card) 30'; Sunday 71'	Report	Fahim 16'; Gafurov (yellow card) 21'; Jamal (yellow card) 36'; Emeka 40'; Maraz 66'	Stadium: Munshigonj District Stadium; Referee: Md Mizanur Rahman

13 February 2022 3	Saif Sporting Club	0–1	Sheikh Russel KC	Munshigonj
15:00 BST (UTC+6)	Shakil (yellow card) 5'	Report	Akmatov 39' (pen.) (yellow card) 45+2'; Didarul (yellow card) 63'; Hemanta (yellow card) 76'; Rahmat (yellow card) 79'	Stadium: Munshigonj District Stadium; Referee: Bituraj Barua

18 February 2022 4	Saif Sporting Club	0–2	Dhaka Mohammedan	Munshigonj
15:00 BST (UTC+6)	Bayisege (yellow card) 89'; Riyadul (yellow card) 90+2'	Report	Diabate 32'; Emon 49': Forhad (yellow card) 53'; Sagar (yellow card) 68'; Anik (yellow card) 70'	Stadium: Munshigonj District Stadium; Referee: Bhubon Mohon Tarafder

24 February 2022 5	Saif Sporting Club	3–3	Chittagong Abahani	Munshigonj
15:00 BST (UTC+6)	Sazzad 5'; Emeka 58' (pen.) 80' (pen.)	Report	Peter 45+3', 67', 90+3' (yellow card) 90+4'	Stadium: Munshigonj District Stadium; Referee: Mohammed Jalaluddin

1 March 2022 6	Swadhinata KS	1–5	Saif Sporting Club	Sylhet
15:00 BST (UTC+6)	Sazzad (yellow card) 7'; Mavlonov 49'	Report	Emery 15'; Pappu (yellow card) 36'; Gafurov 46' (yellow card) 77'; Emeka 35', 70', 79'; Rafi (yellow card) 90+4'	Stadium: Sylhet District Stadium; Referee: Sajjad Hossain

6 March 2022 7	Dhaka Abahani	2–1	Saif Sporting Club	Sylhet
15:00 BST (UTC+6)	Sushanto (yellow card) 23'; Dorielton 75'; Colindres (yellow card) 75' (goal) 90+3' (pen.); Milad (yellow card) 83'; Abu Shaied (yellow card) 85'	Report	Emery 69'	Stadium: Sylhet District Stadium; Referee: Mohammed Jalaluddin

11 March 2022 8	Saif Sporting Club	2–2	Sheikh Jamal DC	Munshigonj
15:30 BST (UTC+6)	Jintu (yellow card) 50'; Udoh 90+2', 90+6' (yellow card) 95'	Report	Valizonov 50'; Shahin (yellow card) 50'; Solomon (yellow card) 75'; Sillah 90+6'	Stadium: Munshigonj District Stadium; Referee: Golam Murshed Chowdhury Nayon

16 March 2022 9	Bashundhara Kings	4–3	Saif Sporting Club	Dhaka
15:00 BST (UTC+6)	Robinho 3'; Motin 26', 55'; Khaled 77'; Yeasin (yellow card) 43'; Ibrahim (yellow card) 81'	Report	Mfon 18'; Foysal 59'; Riyadul 67'; Jamal (yellow card) 83'; Rahim (yellow card) 90+4'	Stadium: Bashundhara Kings Arena; Referee: Golam Mourshed Chowdhury

3 April 2022 10	Saif Sporting Club	3–0	Uttar Baridhara Club	Munshigonj
15:30 BST (UTC+6)	Udoh 12' (yellow card) 28'; Gafurov 45+1'; Sazzad 65'; Jamal (yellow card) 61'; Nasirul (red card) 87'	Report	Mostafa (yellow card) 52'; Kochnov (red card) 87'	Stadium: Munshigonj District Stadium; Referee: Mohammed Jalaluddin

8 April 2022 11	Muktijoddha Sangsad KC	3–3	Saif Sporting Club	Gopalganj
15:30 BST (UTC+6)	Tetsuaki 9'; Didarul 27'; Aminur 35'	Report	Sazzad 21'; Rafi 31'; Gafurov (yellow card) 51'; Udoh 63'	Stadium: Sheikh Fazlul Haque Mani Stadium; Referee: Anisur Rahman

25 April 2022 12	Bangladesh Police FC	1–6	Saif Sporting Club	Rajshahi
15:30 BST (UTC+6)	Djawa 45+2'	Report	Mfon 25'; Emeka 31'; Gafurov 39', 69'; Fahim 78'; Sazzad 82'	Stadium: Rajshahi District Stadium; Referee: Anisur Rahman

30 April 2022 13	Saif Sporting Club	4–2	Rahmatganj MFS	Munshigonj
15:30 BST (UTC+6)	Emery 4' (yellow card) 45+4'; Maraz (yellow card) 16'; Emeka 8', 78'; Udoh 58'	Report	Enamul 62'; Ashraful 75'	Stadium: Munshigonj District Stadium; Referee: Mohammad Jalaluddin

7 May 2022 14	Sheikh Russel KC	0–1	Saif Sporting Club	Dhaka
15:45 BST (UTC+6)		Report	Anny (yellow card) 38'; Rafi 61'; Mitul (yellow card) 67'	Stadium: Bashundhara Kings Arena; Referee: Anisur Rahman

12 May 2022 15	Dhaka Mohammedan	1–3	Saif Sporting Club	Comilla
15:45 BST (UTC+6)	Jasmin (yellow card) 3'; Mona (yellow card) 11'; Rajib (yellow card) 43'; Jafar (yellow card) 53' (goal) 89'	Report	Mfon (yellow card) 5' (goal) 23'; Gafurov (yellow card) 18' (goal) 43'; Emeka 80'	Stadium: Comilla District Stadium; Referee: Alamgir Sarker

23 June 2022 16	Chittagong Abahani	3–4	Saif Sporting Club	Cumilla
16:00 BST (UTC+6)	Apu (yellow card) 50'; O. Popalzay 57'; Candy 65'; Peter 86' (pen.)	Report	Emeka 43', (penalty missed) 51'; Anny (yellow card) 56'; Fahim 72', 74'; Mitul (yellow card) 85'; Bayisenge 90+1' (pen.)	Stadium: Shaheed Dhirendranath Datta Stadium; Referee: Golam Mourshed Chowdhury Nayan

28 June 2022 17	Saif Sporting Club	1–2	Swadhinata KS	Munshigonj
15:30 BST (UTC+6)	Emeka 58'; Riyadul (yellow card) 72' (yellow-red card) 84'	Report	Zillur 67'; Ivan 85' (pen.); Sazal (yellow card) 90'	Stadium: Munshigonj District Stadium; Referee: Md Alamgir Sarker

3 July 2022 18	Saif Sporting Club	4–2	Dhaka Abahani	Munshigonj
15:30 BST (UTC+6)	Mfon 14'; Sabuz 40'; Rahim 65'; Emery 71' (pen.)	Report	Dorielton 34'; Colindres 90+6'	Stadium: Munshigonj District Stadium; Referee: Bhubon Mohon Tarafder

8 July 2022 19	Sheikh Jamal DC	2–2	Saif Sporting Club	Munshigonj
15:30 BST (UTC+6)	Faysal (yellow card) 19'; Sohanur 37'; Otabek 90+4' (pen.)	Report	Riyadul (yellow card) 42'; Meraj (yellow card) 50'; Sazzad (yellow card) 65'; Emery 76' (pen.); Jamal (yellow card) 84'; Gafurov 90+1'	Stadium: Munshigonj District Stadium; Referee: Md Alamgir Sarker

18 July 2022 20	Saif Sporting Club	0–2	Bashundhara Kings	Munshigonj
16:00 BST (UTC+6)	Rahim (yellow card) 45'; Abid (yellow card) 49'; Mfon (yellow card) 65'	Report	Yeasin (yellow card) 9' (yellow-red card) 37'; Motin 28'; Sabuz (yellow card) 37'; Biplu 81'; Rimon (yellow card) 85'	Stadium: Munshigonj District Stadium; Referee: Golam Mourshed Chowdhury Nayan

26 July 2022 21	Uttar Baridhara Club	0–7	Saif Sporting Club	Gopalganj
16:00 BST (UTC+6)	Sujon (red card) 5'; Papon (yellow card) 29'	Report	Mfon 15'; Maraz 45', 64' (yellow card) 45'; Riyadul (yellow card) 49'; Gafurov 67', 85'; Rahim 71'; Abid 90+2'	Stadium: Sheikh Fazlul Haque Mani Stadium; Referee: Anisur Rahman

31 July 2022 22	Saif Sporting Club	2–3	Muktijoddha Sangsad KC	Munshigonj
16:00 BST (UTC+6)	Mfon 73'; Sajon 86' (o.g.) (yellow card) 90+7'; Emery (yellow card) 6' (yellow-red card) 90'	Report	Abdallah 46' (yellow card) 47'; Misawa 45'; Obidur 49'; Razib (yellow card) 89'	Stadium: Munshigonj District Stadium; Referee: Golam Mourshed Chowdhury Nayan

== Statistics ==
=== Goalscorers ===
As of match played till 31 July 2022

Rank	Player	Position	Total	BPL	Independence Cup	Federation Cup
1	(Nigeria) Emeka Ogbugh	FW	14	12	1	1
2	(Nigeria) Mfon Udoh	FW	9	7	1	1
2	(Uzbekistan) Asor Gafurov	FW	10	9	0	1
3	(Rwanda) Emery Bayisenge	DF	8	7	0	1
4	(Bangladesh) Maraz Hossain Opi	FW	7	4	1	2
5	(Bangladesh) Foysal Ahmed Fahim	FW	6	4	2	0
5	(Bangladesh) Sazzad Hossain	MF	6	4	1	1
6	(Bangladesh) Riyadul Hasan Rafi	DF	3	3	0	0
6	(Bangladesh) Rahim Uddin	FW	3	2	0	1
7	(Bangladesh) Abid Hasan	DF	1	1	0	0
7	(Bangladesh) Nasirul Islam Nasir	DF	1	0	1	0
7	(Bangladesh) Sabuz Hossain	DF	1	1	0	0
Own goals			1	1	0	0
Total			69	54	7	8

Source: Matches
