= Ninthoinganba Meetei =

Indian footballer (born 2001)

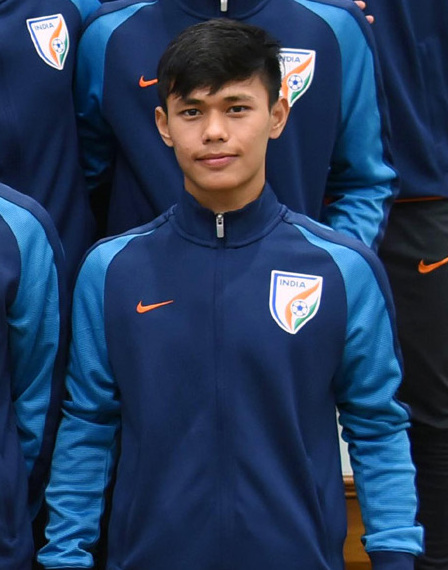
- Ninthoi with India U17 in 2017

Personal information
- Full name: Ninthoinganba Meetei Khumanthem
- Date of birth: 13 July 2001 (age 25)
- Place of birth: Imphal, Manipur, India
- Height: 1.63 m (5 ft 4 in)
- Position: Winger

Team information
- Current team: Punjab
- Number: 7

Youth career
- 2015–2017: AIFF Elite Academy

Senior career*
Years	Team	Apps	(Gls)
2017–2019	Indian Arrows	25	(2)
2019–2021	NorthEast United	24	(0)
2021–2024	Chennaiyin	45	(3)
2024–	Punjab	14	(0)

International career^{‡}
2015–2018	India U17	26	(0)
2017–2019	India U20	16	(1)
2023–2024	India U23	3	(0)
- * Club domestic league appearances and goals as of 18:55, 2 May 2026 (UTC) ‡ National team caps and goals as of 22:21, 25 March 2024 (UTC)

Ninthoinganba Meetei Khumanthem (Meitei: Khumanthem Ninthoinganba Meetei, born 13 July 2001), commonly known as Ninthoi, is an Indian professional footballer who plays as a forward for Indian Super League club Punjab.

== Career ==
Born in Manipur, Meetei was part of the AIFF Elite Academy batch that was preparing for the 2017 FIFA U-17 World Cup to be hosted in India. After the tournament, Meetei was selected to play for the Indian Arrows, an All India Football Federation-owned team that would consist of India under-20 players to give them playing time. He made his professional debut for the side 5 December 2017 against Minerva Punjab. He came on as an 85th-minute substitute as Indian Arrows lost 2–0.

=== NorthEast United ===
Ninthoinganba Meetei, fondly known as Ninthoi was signed by NorthEast United following a terrific 2018-19 campaign for the Indian Arrows on a 3 years deal. Ninthoi had a formidable Indian Super League debut with NorthEast United, making 11 appearances and averaging 18 passes per game. He was retained ahead of the 2020–21 season.

=== Chennaiyin ===
On 7 September 2021, Chennaiyin announced that they had completed the signing of Ninthoi on a three-year deal.

== International ==
Meetei represented the India under-17 side which participated in the 2017 FIFA U-17 World Cup which was hosted in India.

He won the Most Valuable Player Award in 2019 SAFF U-18 Championship.

== Career statistics ==
=== Club ===
As of 20 April 2024

Club	Season	League			Cup		AFC		Total	
Club	Season	Division	Apps	Goals	Apps	Goals	Apps	Goals	Apps	Goals
Indian Arrows	2017–18	I-League	10	0	0	0	—		10	0
Indian Arrows	2018–19	I-League	15	2	2 (Note: Appearance(s) in Super Cup)	0	—		17	2
Indian Arrows	Total		25	2	2	0	0	0	27	2
NorthEast United	2019–20	Indian Super League	11	0	0	0	—		11	0
NorthEast United	2020–21	Indian Super League	13	0	0	0	—		13	0
NorthEast United	Total		24	0	0	0	0	0	24	0
Chennaiyin	2021–22	Indian Super League	14	1	0	0	—		14	1
Chennaiyin	2022–23	Indian Super League	12	0	6 (Note: Appearance(s) in Durand Cup)	0	—		18	0
Chennaiyin	2023–24	Indian Super League	19	2	4	0	—		23	2
Chennaiyin	Total		45	3	10	0	0	0	55	3
Punjab	2024–25	Indian Super League	0	0	0	0	—		0	0
Career total			94	5	12	0	0	0	106	5

== Honours ==
India U-19

- SAFF U-18 Championship: 2019
