= 2019 SAFF U-18 Championship =

Tournament details
- Host country: Nepal
- Dates: 20–29 September
- Teams: 6 (from 1 confederation)
- Venue(s): APF Stadium, Kathmandu

Final positions
- Champions: India (1st title)
- Runners-up: Bangladesh
- Third place: Maldives

Tournament statistics
- Matches played: 10
- Goals scored: 23 (2.3 per match)
- Attendance: 3,900 (390 per match)
- Top scorer(s): (Bangladesh) Tanvir Hossain (Bangladesh) Foysal Ahmed Fahim (India) Gurkirat Singh (2 goals each)
- Best player: (India) Ninthoinganba Meetei
- Fair play award: Bhutan

The 2019 SAFF U-18 Championship was the third edition of the SAFF U-18 Championship, an international football competition for men's under-18 national teams organized by SAFF. The tournament was hosted by Nepal from September 20 to 29 September 2019.

Nepal were the defending champions, having won both the previous editions in 2015 and 2017, however they lost in Group Stage.

== Squads ==
Players born on or after 1 January 2001 were eligible to compete in the tournament. Each team had to register a squad of minimum 18 players and maximum 23 players, minimum three of whom had to be goalkeepers.

== Participating teams ==
Pakistan had sent their entry for the meet and they were placed in Group A. However, due to failure to appoint a normalisation committee federation, they withdrew from the tournament.

Team	Appearances in the SAFF U-19 Championship	Previous best performance
Bangladesh	3rd	Runners-up (2017)
Bhutan	3rd	4th (2017)
India	3rd	Runners-Up (2015)
Maldives	3rd	Group Stage
Nepal (Host)	3rd	Champions (2015, 2017)
Sri Lanka	1st	–

== Officials ==
Referees

- Virendha Rai (Bhutan)
- Mohamed Anisur Rahman (Bangladesh)
- Ashwin Kumar (India)
- Abdulla Sathir (Maldives)
- Kabin Byanjankar (Nepal)
- (Sri Lanka) Ashantha Dias Ponhen Adeege (Sri Lanka)

Assistant Referees

- Tashi Dendup (Bhutan)
- Md Shafiqul Islam (Bangladesh)
- Sanjay E.S. (India)
- Zaheer Hussain (Maldives)
- Yunal Malla (Nepal)
- (Sri Lanka) Dhanushka Sampath Liyanagunawardana (Sri Lanka)

== Group stage ==
- All matches were played at Kathmandu, Nepal.
- Times listed are UTC+05:45.

Key to colours in group tables
Group winners and runners-up advance to the semi-finals

=== Group A ===
Pos	Team	Pld	W	D	L	GF	GA	GD	Pts	Status
1	Bhutan	2	1	1	0	3	0	+3	4	Qualified for Knockout stage
2	Maldives	2	0	2	0	1	1	0	2	Qualified for Knockout stage
3	Nepal	2	0	1	1	1	4	−3	1	

Updated to match(es) played on 24 September 2019. Source: SAFF
20 September 2019
15:00

Nepal	1−1	Maldives
Dangi 75'	Report	Nazeem 12'

APF Stadium, Kathmandu
Attendance: 1,000
Referee: Mohamed Anisur Rahman (Bangladesh)

22 September 2019
15:00

Nepal	0−3	Bhutan
	Report	Dorji 36'; Jigme 86'; Sonam 90'

APF Stadium, Kathmandu
Attendance: 1,000
Referee: Ashwin Kumar (India)

24 September 2019
15:30

Maldives	0−0	Bhutan
	Report

APF Stadium, Kathmandu
Attendance: 150
Referee: Ashantha Dias Ponhen Adeege (Sri Lanka)

=== Group B ===
Pos	Team	Pld	W	D	L	GF	GA	GD	Pts	Status
1	India	2	1	1	0	3	0	+3	4	Qualified for Knockout stage
2	Bangladesh	2	1	1	0	3	0	+3	4	Qualified for Knockout stage
3	Sri Lanka	2	0	0	2	0	6	−6	0	

Updated to match(es) played on 25 September 2019. Source: SAFF
21 September 2019
15:00

Bangladesh	3–0	Sri Lanka
Tanvir 1'; Morshed 76'; Fahim 86'	Report

APF Stadium, Kathmandu
Attendance: 500
Referee: Abdulla Sathir (Maldives)

23 September 2019
15:00

India	0−0	Bangladesh
	Report

APF Stadium, Kathmandu
Attendance: 300
Referee: Kabin Byanjankar (Nepal)

25 September 2019
15:00

Sri Lanka	0−3	India
	Report	G. Singh 61', 89'; A. Chetri 90+2'

APF Stadium, Kathmandu
Attendance: 450
Referee: Virendha Rai (Bhutan)

== Bracket ==
Semi-finals
27 September – APF Stadium, Kathmandu
Bhutan	0
Bangladesh	4
27 September – APF Stadium, Kathmandu
India	4
Maldives	0

Final
29 September – APF Stadium, Kathmandu
Bangladesh	1
India	2
Third place
29 September – APF Stadium, Kathmandu
Bhutan	0
Maldives	1

== Knockout stage ==
- Times listed are UTC+05:45.

=== Semi-finals ===
27 September 2019
11:00

Bhutan	0−4	Bangladesh
	Report	Tanvir 16'; Fahim 27'; Maraz 32'; Dipok 90+2'

APF Stadium, Kathmandu
Attendance: 350
Referee: Ashantha Dias Adeege (Sri Lanka)

27 September 2019
15:00

India	4−0	Maldives
Gahlot 7'; Rasheedh 45+1' (o.g.); M. Singh 79'; Meetei 81'	Report

APF Stadium, Kathmandu
Attendance: 350
Referee: Kabin Byanjankar (Nepal)

=== Third place match ===
29 September 2019
10:30

Bhutan	0−1	Maldives
	Report	Imran 75'

APF Stadium, Kathmandu
Attendance: 150
Referee: Anisur Rahman (Bangladesh)

=== Final ===
29 September 2019
14:30

Bangladesh	1−2	India
Arafat 40'	Report	V. P. Singh 2'; Rana 90+1'

APF Stadium, Kathmandu
Attendance: 500
Referee: Kabin Byanjankar (Nepal)

== Goalscorers ==
There were 23 goals scored in 10 matches, for an average of 2.3 goals per match.

2 goals

- (Bangladesh) Tanvir Hossain
- (Bangladesh) Foysal Ahmed Fahim
- (India) Gurkirat Singh

1 goal

- (Bhutan) Yeshi Dorji
- (Bhutan) Kelzang Jigme
- (Bhutan) Karma Sonam
- (Bangladesh) Maraz Hossain Opi
- (Bangladesh) Fahim Morshed
- (Bangladesh) Dipok Roy
- (Bangladesh) Yeasin Arafat
- (India) Aman Chetri
- (India) Ninthoinganba Meetei
- (India) Narender Gahlot
- (India) Manvir Singh Jr.
- (India) Vikram Pratap Singh
- (India) Ravi Bahandur Rana
- (Maldives) Hassan Nazeem
- (Maldives) Ibrahm Imran
- (Nepal) Manish Dangi

1 own goal

- (Maldives) Ahnaf Rasheedh (playing against India)

== Winner ==
3rd SAFF U-18 Championship 2019

India
First title

== Broadcasting rights ==
Country	Broadcaster
Nepal (host)	MYCUJOO.TV
South Asian Countries	MYCUJOO.TV
South-East Asian Countries	MYCUJOO.TV
