= SAFF U-20 Championship =

- Organiser(s): SAFF
- Founded: 2015; 11 years ago
- Region: South Asia
- Teams: 7: Bangladesh; Bhutan; India; Maldives; Nepal; Pakistan; Sri Lanka
- Related competitions: SAFF U-20 Women's Championship
- Current champions: Bangladesh (2nd title)
- Most championships: India (4 titles)
- Website: saffederation.org
- 2026 SAFF U-20 Championship

The SAFF U-18/U-19/U-20 Championship is an annual football championship for male footballers under the age of 20 and is organized by the South Asian Football Federation (SAFF). The championship was held for the first time in August 2015 in Nepal. The tournaments are held just before AFC U-20 Asian Cup qualification matches, keeping in mind about proper preparation for that.

== Results ==
Ed.	Year	Cat.	Host	Final			Third place playoff			No. of teams
Ed.	Year	Cat.	Host	Champion	Score	Runner-up	Third place	Score	Fourth place	No. of teams
1	2015	U-19	Nepal	Nepal	1–1 (5–4 p)	India	Afghanistan and Bangladesh			6
2	2017	U-18	Bhutan	Nepal	^{RR}	Bangladesh	India	^{RR}	Bhutan	5
3	2019	U-18	Nepal	India	2–1	Bangladesh	Maldives	1–0	Bhutan	6
4	2022	U-20	India	India	5–2 (a.e.t.)	Bangladesh	Nepal	^{RR}	Maldives	5
5	2023	U-19	Nepal	India	3–0	Pakistan	Bhutan and Nepal			6
6	2024	U-20	Nepal	Bangladesh	4–1	Nepal	Bhutan and India			6
7	2025	U-19	India	India	1–1 (4–3 p)	Bangladesh	Nepal and Maldives			6
8	2026	U-20	Maldives	Bangladesh	0–0 (4–3 p)	India	Nepal and Bhutan			7

== Participating nations ==
Legend

- 1st – Champions
- 2nd – Runners-up
- 3rd – Third place
- 4th – Fourth place
- 5th – Fifth place (Note: Format of the 2017 tournament was single round-robin between the 5 participating teams. Nepal won the title on head-to-head rule of classification.)
- SF – Semifinals (Note: No third-place match was held in 2015 and 2023.)
- GS – Group stage
- q – Qualified for upcoming tournament
- — Hosts
- × – Did not enter
- • – Did not qualify
- × – Withdrew before qualification
- — Withdrew/Disqualified after qualification
- — Not part of SAFF

Team	(Nepal) 2015	(Bhutan) 2017	(Nepal) 2019	(India) 2022	(Nepal) 2023	(Nepal) 2024	(India) 2025	(Maldives) 2026	Total
Bangladesh	SF	2nd	2nd	2nd	GS	1st	2nd	1st	8
Bhutan	GS	4th	4th	×	SF	SF	GS	SF	7
India	2nd	3rd	1st	1st	1st	SF	1st	2nd	8
Maldives	GS	5th	3rd	4th	GS	GS	SF	GS	8
Nepal	1st	1st	GS	3rd	SF	2nd	SF	SF	8
Pakistan	×	×	×	×	2nd	×	×	GS	2
Sri Lanka	×	×	GS	GS	×	GS	GS	GS	5
Former Team
Afghanistan	SF	Not a SAFF member							1

== Statistics ==
=== Performance by nation ===
Nation	Champions	Runners-up	Third-place	Fourth-place	Semi-Finalists
India	4 (2019, 2022, 2023, 2025)	2 (2015, 2026)	1 (2017)	–	1 (2024)
Bangladesh	2 (2024, 2026)	4 (2017, 2019, 2022, 2025)	–	–	1 (2015)
Nepal	2 (2015, 2017)	1 (2024)	1 (2022)	–	3 (2023, 2025, 2026)
Pakistan	–	1 (2023)	–	–	–
Maldives	–	–	1 (2019)	1 (2022)	1 (2025)
Bhutan	–	–	–	2 (2017, 2019)	3 (2023, 2024, 2026)
Afghanistan*	–	–	–	–	1 (2015)
Sri Lanka	–	–	–	–	–

== Awards ==
Tournament	Most Valuable Player	Top scorer(s)	Goals	Best Goalkeeper	Fair play award
2015	Not Awarded	(Nepal) Anjan Bista (Nepal) Bimal Magar	3	Not Awarded	India
2017	(Bhutan) Orgyen Tshering	(Bangladesh) Jafar Iqbal	5	Not Awarded	Bhutan
2019	(India) Ninthoinganba Meetei	(Bangladesh) Foysal Ahmed Fahim (Bangladesh) Tanvir Hossain (India) Gurkirat Singh	2	Not Awarded	Bhutan
2022	(India) Gurkirat Singh	(India) Gurkirat Singh	8	Not Awarded	Sri Lanka
2023	(India) Manglenthang Kipgen	(Bhutan) Jigme Namgyel (India) Gwgmsar Goyary (Nepal) Samir Tamang	3	(India) Lionel Daryl Rymmei	Bhutan
2024	(Bangladesh) Mirajul Islam	(Bangladesh) Mirajul Islam	4	(Bangladesh) Md Asif	Nepal
2025	(India) Mohammed Arbas	(India) Danny Meitei	5	(India) Suraj Singh Aheibam	India
2026	(India) Omang Dodum	(Maldives) Mohamed Ilan Imran (India) Omang Dodum	3	(Bangladesh) Md Ismail Hossain Mahin	Maldives

== See also ==
- SAFF Championship
- SAFF U-17 Championship
- SAFF Women's Championship
- SAFF U-20 Women's Championship
- SAFF U-17 Women's Championship
