= Nepal national under-20 football team =

National association football team

Nepal U-20
- Nickname: The Young Gorkhalis
- Association: All Nepal Football Association
- Confederation: AFC (Asia)
- Sub-confederation: SAFF (South Asia)
- Head coach: Urjan Shrestha
- Home stadium: Dasarath Rangasala Stadium
- FIFA code: NEP

First international
- Myanmar 5–0 Nepal (Tokyo, Japan; 25 April 1972)

Biggest win
- Maldives 0–4 Nepal (Bhubaneswar, India; 25 July 2022)

Biggest defeat
- Uzbekistan 12–0 Nepal (Tashkent, Uzbekistan; 10 May 2002)

AFC U-20 Championship
- Appearances: 4 (first in 1971)
- Best result: Group stage (4 times)

SAFF U-20 Championship
- Appearances: 6 (first in 2015)
- Best result: Champions (2015, 2017)

The Nepal national under-20 football team is the national under-20 team of Nepal that represents Nepal in international competitions. The team is governed by the All Nepal Football Association and is a member of the Asian Football Confederation (AFC). The youth side mostly plays their home games at Dasarath Rangasala Stadium located at Tripureswhor in Kathmandu.

== Coaches ==
=== Coaching staff ===
As of 23 March 2025

Position	Name
Head coach	(Nepal) Urjan Shrestha
Assistant coach	(Nepal) Mangal Maharjan
Assistant coach	(Nepal) Binam Shrestha
Goalkeeper coach	(Nepal) Sanjiv Joshi
Physio	(Nepal) Anish Budathoki
Team Manager	(Nepal) Rabin Khadka

=== Manager history ===
Year	Head coach
2024–	(Nepal) Urjan Shrestha

== Squad ==
=== Current U-20 squad ===
The following 23 players were named in the squad for the 2025 AFC U-20 Asian Cup qualification.

No.	Pos.	Player	Date of birth (age)	Caps	Goals	Club
	GK	Amit Tamatta				
	GK	Jiyarath Shekh				
	GK	Krishal Moktan				
	DF	Aayush Timsina				
	DF	Ashwin Ghorasainee				
	DF	Bikram Tamang				
	DF	Nirmal Bal				
	DF	Ram Thapa				
	DF	Sabin Ghimire				
	DF	Semanta Thapa				
	DF	Dipak Thapa Magar				
	MF	Abinash Syangtan				
	MF	Abinash Syangtan				
	MF	Kushal Deuba				
	MF	Lachu Thapa				
	MF	Saroj Darlami				
	MF	Prashant Laksam				
	FW	Anil Bhomjan				
	FW	Dhana Singh BK				
	FW	Dharbendar Kunwar				
	FW	Nyima Wangel Tamang				
	FW	Niraj Karki				
	FW	Samir Tamang				
	FW	Nirajan Dhami				
	FW	Bikash Bhandari	2007 jan 2			

==== Recent U-20 call-ups ====
The following players were called up to the squad in the past 12 months.

Pos.	Player	Date of birth (age)	Caps	Goals	Club	Latest call-up
^{INJ} Withdrew due to injury^{PRE} Preliminary squad / standby^{TP} Training partner^{WD} Player withdrew from the squad due to non-injury issue.

=== Current U-19 squad ===
The following final player list were named in the squad for the 2025 SAFF U-19 Championship.

No.	Pos.	Player	Date of birth (age)	Caps	Goals	Club
	GK	Bhakta Bahadur Pariyar	30 January 2008 (age 18)			(All Nepal Football Association) Nepal Police U-18
	GK	Upendra Lawan				
	GK	Bishesh Bania	11 September 2009 (age 17)			(All Nepal Football Association) NRT U16
	DF	Roshan Tamang				
	DF	Rohan Moktan				
	DF	Prashant Moktan	21 January 2009 (age 17)			(All Nepal Football Association) NPC U-16
	DF	Kusan Nembang				
	DF	Madan Paudel				
	MF	Ram Thapa (captain)	4 April 2009 (age 17)			(All Nepal Football Association) NPC U-16
	DF	Siddant Khadka				
	DF	Bijay Urba				
	MF	Krishna Bahadur Ale	6 December 2008 (age 17)			(All Nepal Football Association) Sankata U-16
	MF	Krish Thapa Magar				
	MF	Saroj Darlami				
	MF	Lachhu Thapa	4 April 2009 (age 17)			(All Nepal Football Association) NPC U-16
	MF	Sabin Lungeli Magar	27 December 2008 (age 17)			(All Nepal Football Association) Sankata U-16
	MF	Ranjit Lama	11 December 2008 (age 17)			(All Nepal Football Association) NPC U-16
11	MF	Subash Bam Thakuri	5 September 2008 (age 18)	1	0	(Philippine Football Federation) Siniloan Lions
	MF	Bigyan Khadka	10 November 2008 (age 18)			(All Nepal Football Association) NRT U-16
	FW	Pawan Pakhrin				(All Nepal Football Association) APF U-18
	FW	Dharbendra Kunwar	17 March 2007 (age 19)			(All Nepal Football Association) Jawalkhel
	FW	Sujan Dangol				(All Nepal Football Association) Planning Boyz
	FW	Prasun Tamang				

==== Recent U-19 call-ups ====
The following players were called up to the squad in the past 12 months.

Pos.	Player	Date of birth (age)	Caps	Goals	Club	Latest call-up
^{INJ} Withdrew due to injury^{PRE} Preliminary squad / standby^{TP} Training partner^{WD} Player withdrew from the squad due to non-injury issue.

== Fixtures and results ==
Matches in the last 12 months, and future scheduled matches
Win Draw Loss Fixture

== Competition records ==
=== FIFA U-20 World Cup ===
FIFA U-20 World Cup finals record										FIFA U-20 World Cup qualifying record								
Year	Result	Pts	Pld	W	D	L	GF	GA	GD	Result	Pts	Pld	W	D	L	GF	GA	GD
(Tunisia) 1977 to (United Arab Emirates) 2003	did not qualify									Did not qualify								
(Netherlands) 2005	did not qualify									Round 1	3	3	1	0	2	1	6	−5
(Canada) 2007 to (Poland) 2019	did not qualify									Did not qualify								
(Indonesia) 2021	Cancelled									Did not qualify								
(Argentina) 2023	Did not qualify									Did not qualify								
(Chile) 2025	Did not qualify									Did not qualify								
(Azerbaijan) (Uzbekistan) 2027	Disqualified due to FIFA suspension									Disqualified due to FIFA suspension								
(Georgia (country)) (Armenia) 2029	Did not enter									Did not enter								
Total	0/25	0	0	0	0	0	0	0	0	1/24	3	3	1	0	2	1	6	−5

=== AFC U-20 Asian Cup ===
AFC U-19 Championship finals record										AFC U-19 Championship qualifying record								
Year	Result	Pts	Pld	W	D	L	GF	GA	GD	Result	Pts	Pld	W	D	L	GF	GA	GD
(Malaysia) 1959 to (Thailand) 1969	Non-FIFA member									Non-FIFA member								
(Philippines) 1970	Did not enter									No Qualifying Tournament								
(Japan) 1971	Round 1	0	3	0	0	3	1	8	–7	No Qualifying Tournament								
(Thailand) 1972	Round 1	0	3	0	0	3	0	19	–19	No Qualifying Tournament								
(Iran) 1973	Did not enter									No Qualifying Tournament								
(Thailand) 1974	Round 1	0	3	0	0	3	4	14	–10	No Qualifying Tournament								
(Kuwait) 1975	Did not enter									No Qualifying Tournament								
(Thailand) 1976	Did not enter									No Qualifying Tournament								
(Iran) 1977	Did not qualify									Did not enter								
(Bangladesh) 1978	Did not qualify									Did not enter								
(Thailand) 1980	Did not qualify									Group 1 (5th)	0	4	0	0	4	2	17	–15
(Thailand) 1982	Did not qualify									Round 2, Group A (3rd)	0	2	0	0	2	0	11	–11
(United Arab Emirates) 1985	Did not qualify									Did not enter								
(Saudi Arabia) 1986	Did not qualify									Group 5 (2nd)	1	2	0	2	0	2	0	+2
(Qatar) 1988	Did not qualify									Did not enter								
(Indonesia) 1990	Did not qualify									Group 4 (2nd)	4	3	1	2	0	1	0	+1
(United Arab Emirates) 1992	Did not qualify									Group 3 (3rd)	4	4	1	2	1	4	4	+0
(Indonesia) 1994	Did not qualify									Unknown								
(South Korea) 1996	Did not qualify									Group 7 (3rd)	4	4	1	2	1	4	4	+0
(Thailand) 1998	Did not qualify									Group 4 (5th)	0	4	0	0	4	0	22	–22
(Iran) 2000	Did not qualify									Group 4 (4th)	1	3	0	1	2	0	9	–9
(Qatar) 2002	Did not qualify									Group 6 (3rd)	0	2	0	0	2	0	13	–13
(Malaysia) 2004	Round 1	3	3	1	0	2	1	6	–5	Group 5 (1st)	3	2	1	1	0	4	1	+4
(India) 2006	Did not qualify									2nd (Group 6)	0	2	0	0	2	0	3	−3
(Saudi Arabia) 2008	Did not qualify									4th (Group D)	0	3	0	0	3	0	6	−6
(China) 2010	Did not qualify									5th (Group A)	3	5	1	0	4	6	13	−7
(United Arab Emirates) 2012	Did not qualify									Did not enter								
(Myanmar) 2014	Did not qualify									5th (Group A)	0	4	0	0	4	1	10	−9
(Bahrain) 2016	Did not qualify									4th (Group D)	1	3	0	1	2	1	13	–13
(Indonesia) 2018	Did not qualify									5th (Group A)	0	4	0	0	4	0	12	−12
(Uzbekistan) 2020	Cencelled due to COVID-19									4th (Group D)	1	3	0	1	2	0	8	−8
(Uzbekistan) 2023	Did not qualify									5th (Group B)	0	4	0	0	4	1	14	−13
(China) 2025	Did not qualify									4th (Group B)	3	4	1	0	3	4	15	−11
(China) 2027	Disqualified due to FIFA suspension									Disqualified due to FIFA suspension								
(China) 2029	Did not enter									Did not enter								
Total	4/39	3	12	1	0	11	6	47	–41	-	–	–	–	–	–	–	–	–

=== SAFF U-20 Championship ===
SAFF U-20 Championship
Host/Year	Result	Position	GP	W	D	L	GS	GA
(Nepal) 2015	Champions	1/6	4	3	1	0	9	5
(Bhutan) 2017	Champions	1/5	4	3	0	1	6	2
(Nepal) 2019	Group stage	5/6	2	0	1	1	1	4
(India) 2022	Third	3/5	4	2	1	1	8	9
(Nepal) 2023	Semi-finals	3/6	3	1	1	1	5	3
(Nepal) 2024	Runners-up	2/6	4	2	1	1	5	6
(India) 2025	Semi-finals	3/6	3	1	0	2	6	6
(Maldives) 2026	Semi-finals	3/7	4	2	1	1	4	3
Total	2 Titles	2/7	28	14	6	8	44	38

== See more ==
- Nepal national under-23 football team
- Nepal national under-17 football team
- AFC Youth Championship
