= Michael (footballer, born 1993) =

Brazilian footballer

Personal information
- Full name: Michael Vinícius Silva de Morais
- Date of birth: 19 April 1993 (age 33)
- Place of birth: São Francisco de Sales, Brazil
- Height: 1.87 m (6 ft 1 1/2 in)
- Position: Forward

Youth career
- 2010–2011: Rio Preto
- 2011–2012: Fluminense

Senior career*
Years	Team	Apps	(Gls)
2012–2017	Fluminense	25	(8)
2014	→ Criciúma (loan)	3	(0)
2016	→ Estoril (loan)	14	(1)
2016	→ América Mineiro (loan)	21	(3)
2018	Resende	1	(0)
2018	América		
2018	Ferroviária		
2019	Cascavel CR	3	(0)
2019	Linköping City	19	(14)
2020	Iwate Grulla Morioka	0	(0)
2020	Vasalund	9	(0)
2021	Asante Kotoko	4	(2)
2022	River	4	(0)
2022	Artsul	2	(0)
2022–2023	Rahmatganj	7	(2)
- * Club domestic league appearances and goals as of 27 March 2023

Michael Vinícius Silva de Morais (born 19 April 1993), simply known as Michael, is a Brazilian professional footballer who most recently played as a forward for Bangladesh Premier League club Rahmatganj.

== Career ==
In April 2019, Michael went on a trial at FC Linköping City in Sweden. The trial went well, and the club announced that they had signed with the player on 17 April. The player signed for one year and got shirt number 23. On the same day as the official announcement - on 19 January - Michael got his debut against BK Forward and also scored in that game.
