= ANFA Complex =

Football stadium complex in Lalitpur, Nepal

FIFA Complex
- Interactive map of FIFA Complex
- Full name: FIFA Complex, Satdobato
- Former names: ANFA House
- Location: Lalitpur, Nepal
- Coordinates: 27.662119°N 85.329912°E
- Owner: National Sports Council; Ministry of Youth and Sports
- Operator: All Nepal Football Association
- Capacity: 6,000
- Surface: AstroTurf

Construction
- Opened: 1999
- Renovated: 2012; 2014; 2015

Tenant
- All Nepal Football Association

ANFA Complex is a football stadium and training facility and hosts the headquarters of All Nepal Football Association in Lalitpur, Nepal built in 1999 by All Nepal Football Association. It consists of ANFA House (the current HQ of ANFA), an ANFA Academy, a hostel, and a football ground.

Initially built as an office and hostel for youth-level players, a ground was constructed alongside the facility in order to train the players onsite. The ground was later renovated to include an artificial turf for pitch durability due to Nepal's climate requiring constant pitch maintenance. It was built under FIFA's GOAL Project. In 2015, parapets was then constructed and the ground was inaugurated as a national stadium in time for the 2015 SAFF U-19 Championship. With a capacity of 6,000 audiences, ANFA Complex played the role as an unrivaled setting for 43rd edition of the Martyr’s Memorial A-Division League.

== History ==
=== Construction ===
As of 2015, there has been 4 FIFA Goal Programmes in aid of football development in Nepal.

The ANFA Academy is responsible for the development of youth players and tries to promote football in Nepal. The academy scouts new talents from all over the country and trains them in three age groups: U-12, U-15 and U-17. There are currently 58 youngsters living in the academy's hostel.

ANFA also has technical centres in Chyasal, Butwal and Dharan. Due to the success of the scheme, ANFA began to build technical centers in Chyasal of Lalitpur, Butwal, Rupandehi, Sunsari and Dharan under the FIFA Goal project. Similarly, ANFA has planned to open technical centers in Mid-Western and Far-Western development regions of Nepal in Future.

=== Origins & First FIFA Goal Project ===
On 13 February 2001, the Goal Bureau approved the construction of three technical centres in Bharatpur, Baghkhor and Mechinagar. The project was financed by Goal and the FIFA Financial Assistance Program, while the respective regional governments donated the necessary plots of land. Construction work was due to be completed by the start of 2004.

During construction, young players were intended be the primary beneficiaries of the new facilities. At the time, the national association had already set up seven academies (for U-19, U-14, U-12 and U-10 players) with their activities thus far having centered on the Nepalese capital, Kathmandu. The new regional centers allowed the project to be extended across the nation. The national association's headquarters in Kathmandu, with its technical centre, playing field and player accommodation, was opened early in 2000 by the President of the Asian Football Confederation, Mohammed Bin Hammam. The facilities have since made it possible for the national association to embark on its long-coveted objective of an ongoing youth development scheme. The complex also offered national association employees an optimal infrastructure which allowed them to carry out their day-to-day tasks and coordinate football activities across Nepal. In total, the 3 regional technical centres in Bharatpur, Baghkhor, and Mechinagar were built for US$450,647.

== ANFA House ==
In 2005, following the construction of three regional training facilities under Project l, the second project submitted by the All Nepal Football Association consisted of a national technical centre offering accommodation for players and officials, a gymnasium, a recuperation zone, meeting rooms and classrooms, a medical centre, a kitchen and dining rooms, and a training pitch. Situated in the west of Kathmandu (Lalitpur), the complex was planned to be primarily made available to football novices and emerging young talent. The association intended to hold regular, long-term training programs there.

In Goal Project II, FIFA provided the All Nepal Football Association US$400,000 (with a further US$400,000 from the FAP and Association) for upgrading ANFA House at ANFA Complex along with the completion of the ANFA Technical Center, Chyasal. The contractors (KC Construction, a construction group of Bhaktapur) were approved by FIFA. Alongside this, ANFA was given the assurance of a Goal-III project if the construction work will finish by March 2011. After 10 months of construction, a 2-storey hostel was built to house up to 60 players at a time. In total, FIFA Goal Project II in Nepal costed US$800,000.

== ANFA Academy ==
During the 2012 AFC Challenge Cup in Nepal, FIFA President Sepp Blatter also inaugurated Nepal's FIFA Goal Programme III by lighting an oil lamp in a ceremony held at the ANFA Complex. ANFA President (then AFC Vice President) Ganesh Thapa also pledged to use the funding to construct three academies for 150 players, and a women's academy. The upgradation of the ANFA Complex and stadium construction included the construction of ANFA Technical Center, Butwal and ANFA Technical Center, Dharan. The football academy cost US$400,000 in total.

=== Artificial Turf Training Ground ===
With a further US$500,000 of financial assistance from FIFA Goal Project IV, artificial turf was laid out due to Nepal's weather conditions hampering grass-pitch quality. The newly laid out turf was inaugurated in 2014 with a friendly match between the Nepal Sports Journalists Forum and the FA.

In 2015, the All Nepal Football Association constructed parapets to expand the capacity of the ground to 4,000 as a national stadium due to the condition of the Dasarath Rangasala Stadium caused from the April 2015 Nepal earthquake.

The ground was initially opened as a grass-pitch which housed a capacity of 1,000 spectators. However, in 2014, with of FIFA-funding, the ground became the first pitch in Nepal to have artificial turf. Minister for Youth and Sports Purusottam Paudel laid the foundation stone for the parapet of the turf after inaugurating the first ever artificial turf in the country.

== Hosted events ==
- 2015 SAFF U-19 Championship
- 2017 SAFF U-15 Championship
- 2018 SAFF U-15 Championship
- 2024 SAFF U-20 Championship
- regular matches of Martyr's Memorial A-Division League and Nepal National League
- selected matches of the Nepal national football team

== See also ==
- Football in Nepal
- All Nepal Football Association
- Nepal national football team
