= Bhutan national under-20 football team =

Bhutan U-20
- Association: Bhutan Football Federation
- Confederation: AFC (Asia)
- Sub-confederation: SAFF (South Asia)
- Head coach: Gary Phillips
- FIFA code: BHU
First colours	Second colours

The Bhutan national under-20 football team represents Bhutan in men's international under-20 football. The team is controlled by the governing body for football in Bhutan, the Bhutan Football Federation, which is a member of the Asian Football Confederation and the South Asian Football Federation.

== History ==
The team made their competitive debut in 2015 at the 2015 SAFF U-19 Championship. Their debut match was a 3–1 loss to Nepal. Club Brugge youth player Bimal Magar opened the scoring after ten minutes for the hosts, but Bhutan equalised straightaway through defender Sonam Tobgay. They were unable to capitalise on this however as Magar, despite missing a penalty, went on to complete his hat-trick to seal victory for Nepal. Bhutan manager Nawang Dendup said that the loss was due to his team defending too deep and not being able to match the speed of their opponents.

== Competitive record ==
=== SAFF U-18, U-19 and U-20 Championship ===
The SAFF's youth tournament has had various age restrictions over the years, from under-18 to under-20.

Year	Round	Pld	W	D	L	GF	GA
(Nepal) 2015 (U19)	Group stage	2	0	0	2	1	5
(Bhutan) 2017 (U18)	Round-robin	4	2	0	2	2	5
(Nepal) 2019 (U18)	Third place match	4	1	1	2	3	5
(India) 2022 (U20)	Did not participate						
(Nepal) 2023 (U19)	Semi-finals	3	1	1	1	5	5
(Nepal) 2024 (U20)	Semi-finals	3	1	1	1	3	3
(India) 2025 (U19)	Group stage	2	0	1	1	2	5
(Maldives) 2026 (U20)	Semi-finals	4	1	1	2	2	7
Total		22	6	5	11	18	35
