= 2015 SAFF U-19 Championship =

Tournament details
- Host country: Nepal
- Dates: 20–29 August
- Teams: 6 (from 1 confederation)
- Venue: ANFA Complex (in Lalitpur host cities)

Final positions
- Champions: Nepal (1st title)
- Runners-up: India
- Third place: Not Awarded

Tournament statistics
- Matches played: 9
- Goals scored: 24 (2.67 per match)
- Attendance: 24,704 (2,745 per match)
- Top scorer(s): (Nepal) Bimal Magar (Nepal) Anjan Bista (3 goals)

The 2015 SAFF U-19 Championship was the 1st edition of the SAFF U-19 Championship, an international football competition for men's under-19 national teams organized by SAFF. The tournament was hosted by Nepal from 20–29 of August. Six teams from the region took part, dividing into two groups. Nepal defeated India in the penalty shot in the finals and won the championship making Nepal first country to win the first U-19 SAFF Championship.

On 3 August, both Pakistan and Sri Lanka withdrew from the competition.

== Participating teams ==
The following six nations competed in the tournament.

Team	Appearances in the SAFF U-19 Championship	Previous best performance
Afghanistan	1st	n/a
Bangladesh	1st	n/a
Bhutan	1st	n/a
India	1st	n/a
Maldives	1st	n/a
Nepal (Host)	1st	n/a

== Venue ==
All matches was played at ANFA Complex, Lalitpur, Nepal.

Lalitpur	2015 SAFF U-19 Championship is located in Nepal
ANFA Complex	2015 SAFF U-19 Championship is located in Nepal
Capacity: 6,000	2015 SAFF U-19 Championship is located in Nepal

== Group stage ==
- All matches were played in Lalitpur, Nepal.
- Times listed are UTC+05:45.

Key to colours in group tables
Group winners and runners-up advance to the semi-finals

=== Group A ===
Team	Pld	W	D	L	GF	GA	GD	Pts
Nepal	2	2	0	0	5	2	+3	6
Bangladesh	2	1	0	1	3	2	+1	3
Bhutan	2	0	0	2	1	5	−4	0

20 August 2015
15:30 UTC+05:45

Nepal	3–1	Bhutan
Bimal 10', 29', 62'	Report	Sonam 11'

ANFA Complex, Lalitpur
Attendance: 3,000
Referee: Halim Aqa (Afghanistan)

22 August 2015
15:30 UTC+05:45

Bhutan	0–2	Bangladesh
	Report	Rohit 42'; Mannaf 44'

ANFA Complex, Lalitpur
Attendance: 2,610
Referee: Adam Fazeel (Maldives)

24 August 2015
15:30 UTC+05:45

Bangladesh	1–2	Nepal
Rohit 11'	Report	Anjan 18' (pen.); Badsha 90+4' (o.g.)

ANFA Complex, Lalitpur
Attendance: 3,000
Referee: Ramchandra Venkatesh (India)

=== Group B ===
Team	Pld	W	D	L	GF	GA	GD	Pts
India	2	2	0	0	5	0	+5	6
Afghanistan	2	1	0	1	3	3	0	3
Maldives	2	0	0	2	1	6	−5	0

21 August 2015
15:30 UTC+05:45

Afghanistan	3–1	Maldives
Masaud 45'; Mansory 71'; Ahmadi 82'	Report	Hamdhaan 85'

ANFA Complex, Lalitpur
Attendance: 500
Referee: Kabin Byanjankar (Nepal)

23 August 2015
15:30 UTC+05:45

Afghanistan	0–2	India
	Report	Kamalpreet 11'; Anirudh 86'

ANFA Complex, Lalitpur
Attendance: 4,801
Referee: Prajwol Chhetri (Nepal)

25 August 2015
15:30 UTC+05:45

India	3–0	Maldives
Moinuddin 41'; Khiangte 47'; Anirudh 71'	Report

ANFA Complex, Lalitpur
Attendance: 3,180
Referee: Kabin Byanjankar (Nepal)

== Knockout stage ==
- In the knockout stages, if a match finished goalless at the end of normal playing time, extra time would have been played (two periods of 15 minutes each) and followed, if necessary, by a penalty shoot-out to determine the winner.

=== Bracket ===
Semi-finals
27 August – Lalitpur
Nepal	3
Afghanistan	2
27 August – Lalitpur
Bangladesh	0 (3)
India (p)	0 (4)

Final
29 August – Lalitpur
Nepal (p)	1 (5)
India	1 (4)

=== Semi-finals ===
27 August 2015
12:00 UTC+05:45

Nepal	3–2	Afghanistan
Anjan 34', 39' (pen.); Sunil 53'	Report	Ananta 50' (o.g.); Rezayee 72'

ANFA Complex, Lalitpur
Attendance: 3,000
Referee: Ramchandra Ventaktesh (India)

27 August 2015
15:30 UTC+05:45

Bangladesh	0–0	India
	Report
Penalties
Jony (penalty scored); Rohit (penalty scored); Ibrahim (penalty missed); Emon (penalty missed); Mannaf (penalty scored); Rahmat (penalty missed)	3–4	(penalty missed) Khiangte; (penalty scored) Shahbaz; (penalty scored) Kumar; (penalty scored) Gursimrat; (penalty missed) Sarthak; (penalty scored) Lalhlimpuia

ANFA Complex, Lalitpur
Attendance: 1,613
Referee: Halim Aqa (Afghanistan)

=== Final ===
29 August 2015
15:00 UTC+05:45

Nepal	1–1	India
Tej 32'	Report	Shahbaz 85' (pen.)
Penalties
Hemant (penalty scored); Sunil (penalty scored); Biswas (penalty scored); Dona (penalty scored); Ananta (penalty scored)	5–4	(penalty missed) Moinuddin; (penalty scored) Hayden; (penalty scored) Sarthak; (penalty scored) Lalhlimpuia; (penalty scored) Shahbaz

ANFA Complex, Lalitpur
Attendance: 3,000
Referee: Adam Fazeel (Maldives)

== Winner ==
2015 SAFF U-19 Championship

Nepal
First title

== Goalscorers ==
3 goals

- (Nepal) Anjan Bista
- (Nepal) Bimal Magar

2 goals

- (Bangladesh) Rohit Sarkar
- (India) Anirudh Thapa

1 goal

- (Afghanistan) Mohammad Ahmadi
- (Afghanistan) Masaud Habibi
- (Afghanistan) Ali Ahmad Mansory
- (Afghanistan) Mehdi Rezayee
- (Bangladesh) Mannaf Rabby
- (Bhutan) Sonam Togbay
- (Maldives) Hamdhaan Ali
- (Nepal) Sunil Bal
- (Nepal) Tej Tamang
- (India) Moinuddin Khan
- (India) Shahbaz Khan
- (India) Lalramzauva Khiangte
- (India) Kamalpreet Singh

1 own goal

- (Bangladesh) Tutul Hossain Badsha (against Nepal)
- (Nepal) Ananta Tamang (against Afghanistan)
