= Halchowk Stadium =

Stadium in Kathmandu, Nepal

- हलचोक मैदान
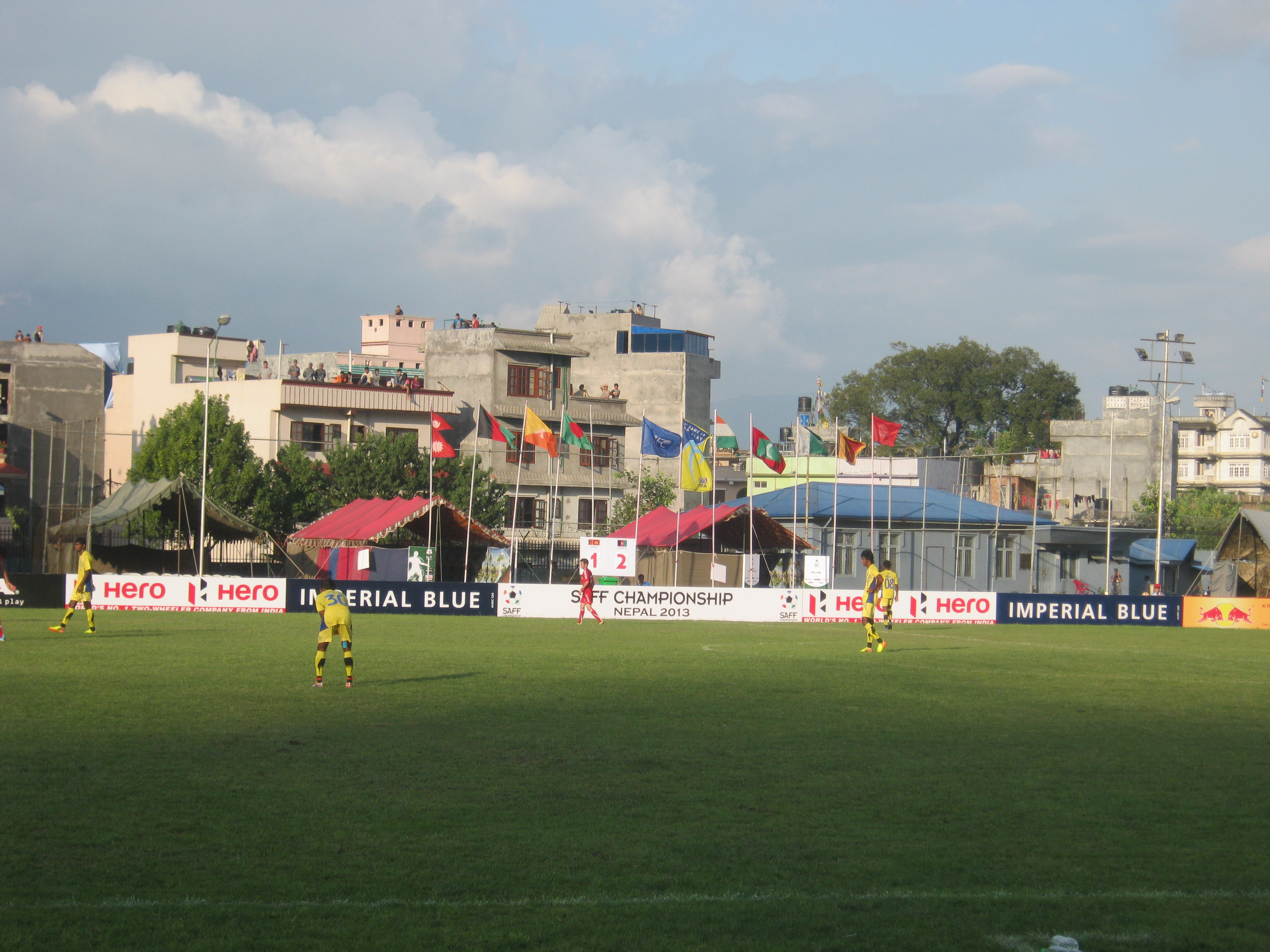
- SAFF Championship 2013
- Interactive map of Halchowk Stadium
- Location: Kathmandu, Nepal
- Coordinates: 27°43′10.44″N 85°16′57.23″E
- Elevation: 1,323 m (4,341 ft)
- Owner: Government of Nepal
- Operator: Armed Police Force Nepal
- Capacity: 5,000
- Surface: Grass

Construction
- Opened: 1998
- Renovated: 2011

Tenants
- APF FC; APF WFC; Nepal national football team (selected matches)

Halchowk Stadium (also known as APF Stadium) is a multi-purpose stadium in Kathmandu, Bagmati Province, Nepal. The stadium can accommodate 5,000 spectators. It is mainly used for football matches.

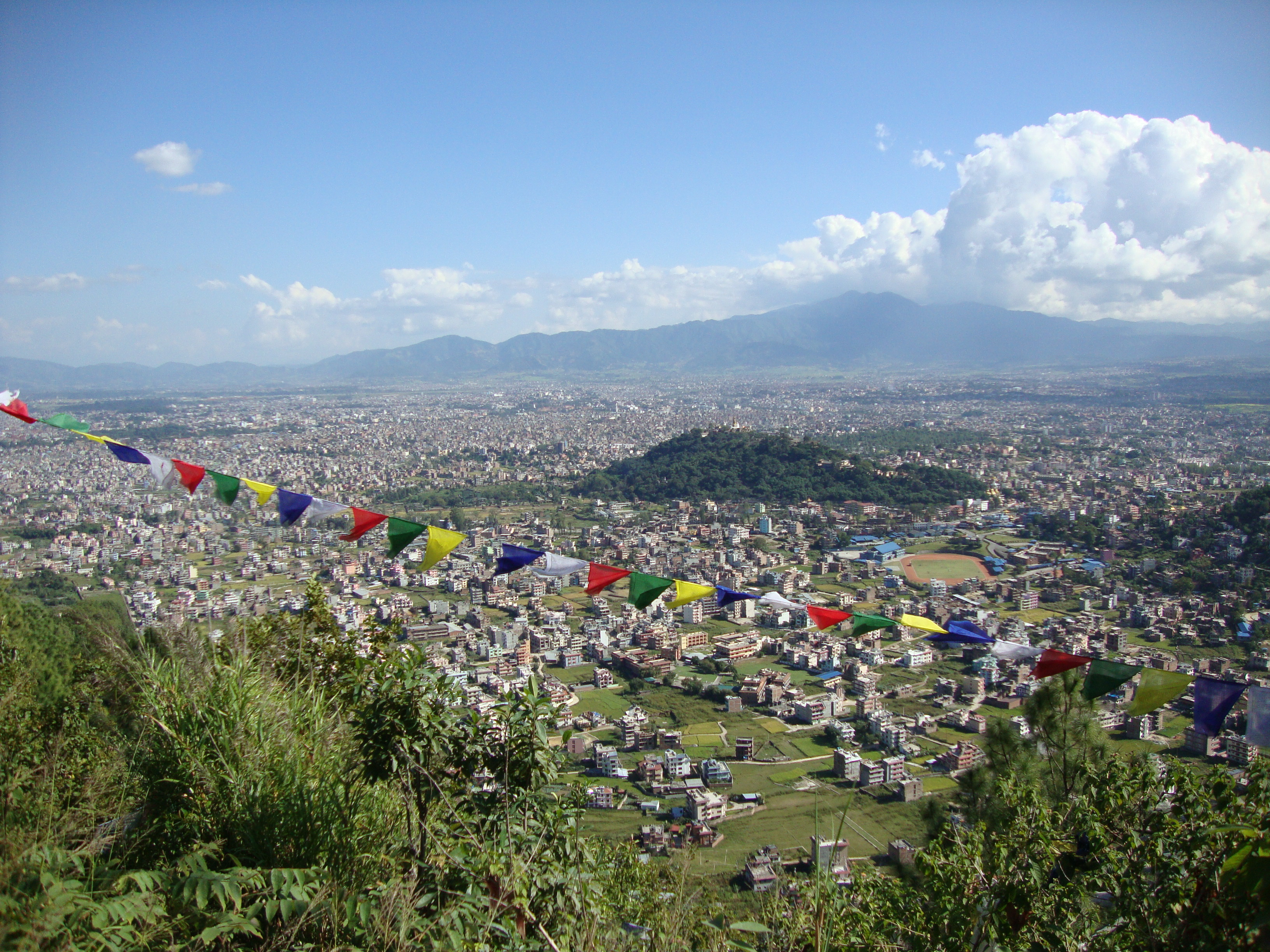
View of the stadium beneath Swayambhu Hill

== Hosted events ==
- 2005 AFC President's Cup
- 2012 AFC Challenge Cup
- 2013 SAFF Championship
- 2017 SAFF U-15 Championship
- 2019 SAFF U-18 Championship
