= 2026–27 Bangladesh Police FC season =

Bangladesh Police FC
2026–27 season
- President: Mosleh Uddin Ahmed
- Head coach: SM Asifuzzaman
- Stadium: Shaheed Barkat Stadium
- BFL: TBD
- Federation Cup: TBD
- AFC Challenge League: Preliminary stage
Home colours	Away colours
- All statistics correct as of 11 August 2026.

The 2026–27 season is the Bangladesh Police Football Club's 8th season in the Bangladesh Football League. In addition to domestic league, Police FC is participating on this season's edition of Federation Cup and AFC Challenge League. The season coveres the period from 1 May 2026 to TBD 2027.

== Players ==
As of 15 August 2025

No.	Player	Nat.	Position(s)	Date of birth	Year signed	Previous club
Goalkeepers
1	Rakibul Hasan Tushar	(Bangladesh)	GK	8 February 1997 (aged 28)	2024	Sheikh Russel KC
16	Kiran Chemjong	(Nepal)	GK	20 March 1990 (aged 35)	2025	(India) Punjab FC
31	Dinaj Hosan Jubed	(Bangladesh)	GK	15 November 1996 (aged 28)	2021	Kawran Bazar PS
66	Md Asif	(Bangladesh)	GK	20 October 2006 (aged 18)	2025	Bashundhara Kings
Defenders
2	Ismail Hossen	(Bangladesh)	RB/CB	1 January 2004 (aged 21)	2021	None
3	Md Sagor Mia	(Bangladesh)	CB	4 February 2000 (aged 25)	2024	Sheikh Russel KC
4	Rabiul Islam	(Bangladesh)	RB	15 June 1997 (aged 27)	2023	Bashundhara Kings
5	Riyadul Hasan Rafi	(Bangladesh)	CB/RB	29 December 1999 (aged 25)	2025	Mohammedan SC
17	Isa Faysal	(Bangladesh)	LB	20 August 1999 (aged 25)	2017	Muktijoddha SKC
32	Rakib Hossen	(Bangladesh)	RB		2025	BFF Elite Academy
33	Akibur Rahman	(Bangladesh)	LB	10 December 2000 (aged 24)	2021	Dipali JS
34	Sharif Uddin Nirob	(Bangladesh)	CB	15 August 2007 (aged 17)	2025	BFF Elite Academy
71	Danilo Quipapá	(Brazil)	CB	21 February 1994 (aged 31)	2025	(India) Delhi FC
77	Sree Joyonto Kumar Roy	(Bangladesh)	CB	28 March 1998 (aged 27)	2017	None
Midfielders
6	Foday Darboe	(The Gambia)	DM	9 March 2003 (aged 22)	2025	(Oman) Sur SC
8	Shafiq Kagimu	(Uganda)	CM	28 November 1998 (aged 26)	2025	(North Macedonia) FK Rabotnichki
10	Orgyen Tshering	(Bhutan)	AM/CM	14 September 1999 (aged 25)	2025	(Bhutan) Thimphu City FC
14	Manik Hossain Molla	(Bangladesh)	DM	11 March 1999 (aged 26)	2024	Mohammedan SC
15	Shamim Ahmed	(Bangladesh)	CM	18 March 1993 (aged 32)	2024	Bangladesh Police FC
18	Moinul Islam Moin	(Bangladesh)	CM/AM	18 February 2005 (aged 20)	2025	Mohammedan SC
27	Md Omar Faruk	(Bangladesh)	DM	12 March 2004 (aged 21)	2025	Unknown
88	Anik Hossain	(Bangladesh)	CM	3 August 1998 (aged 26)	2024	Rahmatganj MFS
96	Suaibur Rahman Mijan	(Bangladesh)	CM	10 March 2002 (aged 23)	2025	Dhaka Rangers FC
Forwards
7	M. S. Bablu	(Bangladesh)	LW/RW	27 November 1997 (aged 27)	2018	Team BJMC
9	Paulo Henrique	(Bangladesh)	CF	30 March 1991 (aged 34)	2025	(Bolivia) ABB
11	Md Rabby Hossen Rahul	(Bangladesh)	LW	30 December 2006 (aged 18)	2025	Bashundhara Kings
12	Sarower Zaman Nipu	(Bangladesh)	LW/RW/CF	5 June 2000 (aged 24)	2025	Dhaka Abahani
19	Ayush Ghalan	(Nepal)	RW	21 February 2004 (aged 21)	2025	(Nepal) Pokhara Thunders
24	Dipok Roy	(Bangladesh)	RW/LW/RWB	12 August 2002 (aged 22)	2024	Sheikh Russel KC
25	Md Yamin Rana	(Bangladesh)	CF		2025	Brothers Union
28	Amirul Islam	(Bangladesh)	CF	1 February 1988 (aged 37)	2025	Bangladesh Police FC
95	Sree Sumon Soren	(Bangladesh)	LW/LWB	11 June 2007 (aged 17)	2025	Brothers Union
97	Sanowar Hossain	(Bangladesh)	CF		2025	
99	Morshedul Islam	(Bangladesh)	CF/RW		2024	

== Transfer ==
=== In ===
No.	Pos	Player	Previous club	Fee	Date	Source
47	MF	(Bangladesh) Akmol Hossain Noyon	(Bangladesh) Bashundhara Kings	Free Transfer	6 July 2026	
80	FW	Hossain Mohammad Arian	Fakirerpool YMC	Free Transfer	15 July 2026	
3	DF	(Bangladesh) Md Rocky	(Bangladesh) Arambagh KS	Free Transfer	23 July 2026	
9	FW	(Senegal) Mohammad Rassoul Ba	(Saudi Arabia) Al-Rawdah Club	Free Transfer	4 August 2026	
19	FW	(Cameroon) Junior Ngong Sam	(Malaysia) Terengganu FC	Free agent	5 August 2026	
5	DF	(Brazil) Marcelinho Junior	(Mongolia) Central Stallions FC	Free Transfer	5 August 2026	

=== Out ===
No.	Pos	Player	Moved to	Fee	Date	Source
29	DF	(Bangladesh) Asadul Islam Sakib	(Bangladesh) Chattogram City FC	Free agent	25 July 2026	
6	MF	(The Gambia) Foday Darboe	(Bangladesh) City Club	Free agent	30 July 2026	

=== Preseason friendly ===
29 July 2026 Friendly Match	Fortis FC	1–1	Bangladesh Police FC	Dhaka
14:00 BST (UTC+6)	P. Babou 80' (pen.)			Stadium: Fortis FC Practice Ground

4 September 2026 Friendly Match	Bangladesh Police FC	1–1	City Club	Dhaka
15:00 BST (UTC+6)				Stadium: Bangladesh Police FC Practice Ground

== Overall ==
Win Draw Loss Fixtures

Competition	First match	Last match	Final Position
BFL	22 September 2026	April 2027	
Federation Cup	October 2026	April 2027	
AFC Challenge League	11 August 2026	11 August 2026	Preliminary stage

=== Overview ===
Competition	Record							
Competition	Pld	W	D	L	GF	GA	GD	Win %
BFL	5	4	1	0	14	1	+13	80.00
Federation Cup	1	0	1	0	1	1	+0	0.00
AFC Challenge League	1	0	0	1	0	1	−1	0.00
Total	7	4	2	1	15	3	+12	57.14

Last updated: 11 August 2026
Source: Competitions

=== Premier League ===
==== League table ====
Pos	Team	Pld	W	D	L	GF	GA	GD	Pts	Qualification or relegation
1	Bangladesh Police	5	4	1	0	14	1	+13	13	Qualification for the AFC; Challenge League qualifying stage
2	Mohammedan	4	4	0	0	13	0	+13	12	
3	Bashundhara Kings	4	3	1	0	15	3	+12	10	
4	City Club	5	3	1	1	12	7	+5	10	
5	Fortis	3	2	1	0	15	3	+12	7	

Updated to match(es) played on 24 October 2026. Source: Soccerway
Rules for classification: 1) Points; 2) Goal difference; 3) Number of goals scored.

==== Results summary ====
Overall								Home						Away					
Pld	W	D	L	GF	GA	GD	Pts	W	D	L	GF	GA	GD	W	D	L	GF	GA	GD
5	4	1	0	14	1	+13	13	2	1	0	10	1	+9	2	0	0	4	0	+4

Source: Soccerway

==== Results by round ====
Round	1	2	3	4	5	6	7	8	9	10	11	12	13	14	15	16	17	18
Ground	H	A	H	H	A													
Result	W	W	W	D	W													
Position	4	1	1	1	1													

Source: Matches
A = Away; H = Home; W = Win; D = Draw; L = Loss; P = Postponed

==== Matches ====
18 September 2026 1	Bangladesh Police FC	1-0	Rahmatganj MFS	Manikganj
15:00 BST (UTC+6)				Stadium: Shaheed Barkat Stadium

2 October 2026 2	Chattogram City FC	0-3	Bangladesh Police FC	Munshiganj
BST 14:45				Stadium: Munshiganj Stadium

2026	v
BST (UTC+6)

2026	v
BST (UTC+6)

2026	v
BST (UTC+6)

=== AFC Challenge League ===
==== Preliminary stage ====
11 August 2026 AFC CL PS	Al Ittihad Ahli (Syria)	1–0	Bangladesh Police	Amman
23:00 BST (UTC+6)	Jordan 44'	AFC Report; GSA Report		Stadium: King Abdullah II Stadium; Attendance: 500; Referee: Amirçon Horkašev (Tajikistan)

== Statistics ==
=== Goalscorers ===
As of 11 August 2026

Rank	Player	Position	Total	BFL	Federation	Challenge League
1	TBC	TBC	0	0	0	0
Total			0	0	0	0
