= 2019–20 Bangladesh Police FC season =

Bangladesh Police FC
2019–20 season
- President: Benazir Ahmed
- Head coach: Nicolas Vitorovic
- Stadium: Bangabandhu National Stadium, Dhaka, Bangladesh
- Bangladesh Premier League: 9th of 13
- Federation Cup: Semi-finals
- Top goalscorer: League: MS Bablu (2 Goals); All: Sidney Rivera (5 Goals)
- Biggest win: Bangladesh Police 3–1 Saif SC; Bangladesh Police 3–1 Arambagh KS
- Biggest defeat: Dhaka Abahani 4–0 Bangladesh Police

The 2019–20 season was Bangladesh Police Football Club's first-ever season in the top flight, the Bangladesh Premier League.

On 16 March 2020, all sorts of sports activities in Bangladesh were postponed until 31 March as a precaution to combat the spread of coronavirus in the country, according to a press release issued by the Ministry of Youth and Sports. Following that, the Bangladesh Football Federation (BFF) postponed all Bangladesh Premier League matches until 31 March.

On 17 May 2020, the BFF executive committee, following an emergency meeting, declared the 12th edition of the league abandoned, scrapping promotion and relegation while cancelling the Independence Cup from the calendar.

== Summary ==
=== Pre-season ===
After promoting to the top-tier league, Police FC announced Nicolas Vitorovic as their head coach for the upcoming season in August. They signed Antonio Laskov, Luka Rotkovic, Aidar Mambetaliev, former Kyrgyzstan international Artur Muladjanov, and Victor Onyilo to fill up the foreign quota. However, Victor was replaced by Puerto Rico national team captain Sidney Rivera. They also signed Bangladesh-origin American footballer Sanjay Karim, which made headlines. He practiced with the team for 2 months but couldn't play in domestic leagues and cups as he doesn't have an International Transfer Certificate (ITC). So his contract was terminated in January 2019.

Police FC played 4 friendlies in October and November. Police FC participated in a pre-season tournament, the Mymensingh DFA Challenge Cup, along with Saif SC and Chittagong Abahani. The first game was won in a tie-breaker against Chittagong Abahani. The second game also won against Saif SC in a tie-breaker, and Police FC qualified for the final. The final match was lost by 1–0 against Chittagong Abahani and ended the pre-season with the runners-up medal.

=== December ===
Police FC started the 2019–20 season on 18 December. They played their first Federation Cup game in 30 years. The match was lost by 4–0 against Dhaka Abahani. However, the second game was won 3–1 against Arambagh KS on 21 December, and they qualified for the quarterfinal. Sidney scored a brace, and Shadin scored in added time. In the quarterfinal, Police FC faced Saif SC on 31 December. The match was also won by 3–1. Bablu scored a goal and Sidney scored a back-to-back brace. Police FC qualified for the first-ever semi-final in their history.

=== January ===
On 3 January, the Federation Cup semi-final was lost by 3–0 against defending runners-up Bashundhara Kings. Thus, the Federation Cup campaign of Police FC ended.

=== February ===
On 16 February, Police FC started their first BPL season against defending runners-up Dhaka Abahani. The match was lost by 2–0. On 20 February, Police FC held defending champion Bashundhara Kings to 1-1. Nurul Faisal of Bashundhara scored an own goal. Police faced another newly promoted team, Uttar Baridhara, on 24 February. Police FC won the match by 2-1 and grabbed their first victory as Sidney and Laskov found the net.

=== March ===
Police FC were held by Brother Union on 6 March. Bablu scored the goal for Police, and the match ended in 1-1. On 13 March, Police FC suffered their second defeat against Rahmatganj MFS by 2–0.

The other matches of the month were postponed due to the COVID-19 pandemic.

== Pre-season and friendlies ==
12 October 2019 Friendly	Bangladesh Police FC	0–3	Chittagong Abahani	Dhaka
			Matthew; Koushik; Rockey	Stadium: APBN Ground

17 October 2019 Friendly	Bangladesh Police FC	2–1	Saif SC	Dhaka
3:30PM BST	Bablu 27'; Mambetaliev 50'	Report	Cordoba (penalty scored)	Stadium: APBN Ground

7 November 2019 Friendly	Bangladesh Police FC	2–0	Muktijoddha Sangsad KC	Dhaka
3:30PM BST	Sidney 14'; Artur 24'	Report

28 November 2019 Friendly Match	Sheikh Russel KC	1-1	Bangladesh Police FC	Dhaka
14:30 BST	Asaduzzaman Bablu		Rotkovic	Stadium: Bashundhara Ground

4 December 2019 Mymensingh DFA Challenge Cup	Chittagong Abahani	2-2 (3-4 p)	Bangladesh Police FC	Mymensingh
	Koushik; Nixon (penalty scored)	Report	Rotkovic Sidney	Stadium: Mymensingh Stadium

6 December 2019 Friendly Match	Saif SC	2-4 (2-3 p)	Bangladesh Police FC	Mymensingh
14:30 BST				Stadium: Rafiq Uddin Bhuiyan Stadium

8 December 2019 Mymensingh DFA Challenge Cup Final	Chittagong Abahani	1-0	Bangladesh Police FC	Mymensingh
	Pulatov 59'	Report		Stadium: Mymensingh Stadium

== Current squad ==
Bangladesh Police FC squad for 2019–20 season.

As of 22 March 2020

Note: Flags indicate national team as defined under FIFA eligibility rules; some limited exceptions apply. Players may hold more than one non-FIFA nationality.

No.	Pos.	Nation	Player
1	GK	BAN	Arifuzzaman Himel
2	DF	BAN	Arif Khan Joy
3	DF	BAN	Azme Omur
4	DF	BAN	Khan Mohammad Tara
5	DF	BAN	Mahmud Alam Shamim
6	MF	BAN	Nazmul Islam Rasel (Captain)
7	MF	BAN	Naimur Rahman Shahed
8	MF	BAN	Ali Hossain
9	FW	MNE	Luka Rotković
10	MF	BUL	Antonio Laskov
11	FW	PUR	Sidney Rivera
12	DF	BAN	Robiul Islam
13	MF	BAN	Shahariar Bappy
14	FW	BAN	Mostakim Shahriar Shayekh
15	DF	BAN	Joyonto Kumar Roy
16	DF	BAN	Sanjay Karim
17	DF	BAN	Isa Faysal
18	DF	KGZ	Artur Muladjanov

No.	Pos.	Nation	Player
19	FW	BAN	Mohammad Jewel
20	FW	BAN	SM Bablu
21	MF	BAN	Mohidul Islam
22	MF	BAN	Md Shadin
23	MF	BAN	Komol Barua
24	MF	BAN	Faisal Ahmed
25	DF	BAN	Jalal Miah
26	MF	BAN	Shamim Ahmed
27	FW	BAN	Amirul Islam
28	FW	BAN	Mohammad Al Amin
29	FW	BAN	Mohammad Robel Jr
30	GK	BAN	Dinaj Hosen Jubed
31	FW	BAN	Jamir Uddin
40	GK	BAN	Mohammad Faysol
60	GK	BAN	Saiful Islam Khan
67	DF	KGZ	Aidar Mambetaliev

== Competition ==
=== Overview ===
Competition	First match	Last match	Starting round	Final position	Record							
Competition	First match	Last match	Starting round	Final position	Pld	W	D	L	GF	GA	GD	Win %
BPL	16 February 2020	TBD 2020	Matchday 1		5	1	2	2	4	7	−3	20.00
Federation Cup	18 December 2019	1 January 2020	Group Stage	Semi-final	4	2	0	2	6	9	−3	50.00
Independence Cup	2020		Group Stage		0	0	0	0	0	0	+0	—
Total					9	3	2	4	10	16	−6	33.33

Last updated: 15 February 2020
Source: UNB Soccerway

=== Federation Cup ===
==== Group A ====
Pos	Team	Pld	W	D	L	GF	GA	GD	Pts	Qualification
1	Dhaka Abahani	2	2	0	0	9	1	+8	6	Quarter-finals
2	Bangladesh Police FC	2	1	0	1	3	5	−2	3	Quarter-finals
3	Arambagh KS	2	0	0	2	2	8	−6	0	

Source: Soccerway

18 December 2019 Match 1	Dhaka Abahani	4–0	Bangladesh Police FC	Bangabandhu National Stadium, Dhaka
16:00 BST	Belfort 28', 71'; Jibon 32'; Chizoba 43'	Report		Referee: Mizanur Rahman (Bangladesh)

21 December 2019 Match 1	Bangladesh Police FC	3-1	Arambagh KS	Dhaka
4:00PM BST	Rivera 32', 82' *Mohammad Shadin 90+1'	Report	Jakir Hossain Ziku 89'	Stadium: Bangabandhu National Stadium; Referee: Mohammad Jalaluddin

==== Knockout stage ====
31 December 2019 Quarterfinal	Saif SC	1-3	Bangladesh Police FC	Dhaka
15:30 UTC+6:00	Akhmedov 55'	Report	Bablu 31'; Rivera 45+1', 52'	Stadium: Bangabandhu National Stadium; Referee: Mizanur Rahman

3 January 2020 Semi-finals	Bangladesh Police FC	0-3	Bashundhara Kings	Dhaka
18:30 BST		Report	Barman 16'; Colindres 49'; Delmonte 90+2'	Stadium: Bangabandhu National Stadium; Referee: Saymoon Hasan Sany (Bangladesh)

=== Premier League ===
==== League table ====
Pos	Team	Pld	W	D	L	GF	GA	GD	Pts
7	Rahmatganj MFS	6	2	1	3	6	5	+1	7
8	Arambagh KS	5	1	2	2	6	9	−3	5
9	Bangladesh Police FC	5	1	2	2	4	7	−3	5
10	Sheikh Russel KC	6	1	2	3	4	7	−3	5
11	Brothers Union	5	0	4	1	6	7	−1	4

Source: Soccerway
Rules for classification: 1) Points; 2) Goal difference; 3) Goals scored.

==== Results summary ====
Overall								Home						Away					
Pld	W	D	L	GF	GA	GD	Pts	W	D	L	GF	GA	GD	W	D	L	GF	GA	GD
5	1	2	2	4	7	−3	5	1	1	1	3	4	−1	0	1	1	1	3	−2

Last updated: 22 March 2020.
Source: Soccerway

==== Results by round ====
Round	1	2	3	4	5	6	7	8	9
Ground	A	H	H	–	A	H			
Result	L	D	W	–	D	L			
Position	12	11	7	7	7	9			

Updated to match(es) played on 22 March 2020. Source: Matches
A = Away; H = Home; W = Win; D = Draw; L = Loss; P = Postponed

=== Matches ===
16 February 2020 1	Dhaka Abahani	2-0	Bangladesh Police FC	Dhaka
18:30 BST	Chizoba 43'; Bernhardt 83'	Report		Stadium: Bangabandhu National Stadium; Referee: Mizanur Rahman (Bangladesh)

20 February 2020 2	Bangladesh Police FC	1-1	Bashundhara Kings	Dhaka, Bangladesh
16:00 BST	Faisal 74' (o.g.)	Report	Sabuz 54'	Stadium: Bangabandhu National Stadium; Referee: Shohrab Hossain (Bangladesh)

24 February 2020 3	Bangladesh Police FC	2–1	Uttar Baridhara	Dhaka
6:30PM BST	Sidney 30'; Laskov 35'	Report	Arif Hossain 46'	Stadium: Bangabandhu National Stadium; Referee: Bhuvon Torofder

6 March 2020 4	Brothers Union	1–1	Bangladesh Police FC	Dhaka
6:30PM BST	Validjanov 8'	Report	MS Bablu 21'	Stadium: Bangabandhu National Stadium; Referee: Mahmud Zamal Farouqee Nahid

13 March 2020 5	Bangladesh Police FC	0–2	Rahmatganj MFS	Dhaka
6:30PM BST		Report	Akobir 44'; Sanowar 90+4'	Stadium: Bangabandhu National Stadium; Referee: GM Chowdhury
