= 2025–26 Bangladesh Police FC season =

Bangladesh Police FC
2025–26 season
- President: Sheikh Md. Sajjad Ali
- Head coach: SM Asifuzzaman
- Stadium: Shaheed Barkat Stadium
- Bangladesh Football League: 4th of 10
- Federation Cup: Group stage
- Top goalscorer: League: Paulo Henrique (6 goals); All: Paulo Henrique (7 goals)
- Biggest win: 1–0 Vs Brothers Union (Away); 27 September 2025 (Football League)
- Biggest defeat: 2–3 Vs Mohammedan SC (Neutral); 23 September 2025 (Federation Cup)
Home colours	Away colours

The 2025–26 season was Bangladesh Police Football Club's 7th season in the Bangladesh Football League. In addition to domestic league, Police FC was participated on this season's edition of Federation Cup. The season coveres the period from 1 May 2025 to 23 May 2026.

== Players ==
As of 15 August 2025

No.	Player	Nat.	Position(s)	Date of birth	Year signed	Previous club
Goalkeepers
1	Rakibul Hasan Tushar	(Bangladesh)	GK	8 February 1997 (aged 28)	2024	Sheikh Russel KC
16	Kiran Chemjong	(Nepal)	GK	20 March 1990 (aged 35)	2025	(India) Punjab FC
31	Dinaj Hosan Jubed	(Bangladesh)	GK	15 November 1996 (aged 28)	2021	Kawran Bazar PS
66	Md Asif	(Bangladesh)	GK	20 October 2006 (aged 18)	2025	Bashundhara Kings
Defenders
2	Ismail Hossen	(Bangladesh)	RB/CB	1 January 2004 (aged 21)	2021	None
3	Md Sagor Mia	(Bangladesh)	CB	4 February 2000 (aged 25)	2024	Sheikh Russel KC
4	Rabiul Islam	(Bangladesh)	RB	15 June 1997 (aged 27)	2023	Bashundhara Kings
5	Riyadul Hasan Rafi	(Bangladesh)	CB/RB	29 December 1999 (aged 25)	2025	Mohammedan SC
17	Isa Faysal	(Bangladesh)	LB	20 August 1999 (aged 25)	2017	Muktijoddha SKC
32	Rakib Hossen	(Bangladesh)	RB		2025	BFF Elite Academy
33	Akibur Rahman	(Bangladesh)	LB	10 December 2000 (aged 24)	2021	Dipali JS
34	Sharif Uddin Nirob	(Bangladesh)	CB	15 August 2007 (aged 17)	2025	BFF Elite Academy
71	Danilo Quipapá	(Brazil)	CB	21 February 1994 (aged 31)	2025	(India) Delhi FC
77	Sree Joyonto Kumar Roy	(Bangladesh)	CB	28 March 1998 (aged 27)	2017	None
Midfielders
6	Foday Darboe	(The Gambia)	DM	9 March 2003 (aged 22)	2025	(Oman) Sur SC
8	Shafiq Kagimu	(Uganda)	CM	28 November 1998 (aged 26)	2025	(North Macedonia) FK Rabotnichki
10	Orgyen Tshering	(Bhutan)	AM/CM	14 September 1999 (aged 25)	2025	(Bhutan) Thimphu City FC
14	Manik Hossain Molla	(Bangladesh)	DM	11 March 1999 (aged 26)	2024	Mohammedan SC
15	Shamim Ahmed	(Bangladesh)	CM	18 March 1993 (aged 32)	2024	Bangladesh Police FC
18	Moinul Islam Moin	(Bangladesh)	CM/AM	18 February 2005 (aged 20)	2025	Mohammedan SC
27	Md Omar Faruk	(Bangladesh)	DM	12 March 2004 (aged 21)	2025	Unknown
88	Anik Hossain	(Bangladesh)	CM	3 August 1998 (aged 26)	2024	Rahmatganj MFS
96	Suaibur Rahman Mijan	(Bangladesh)	CM	10 March 2002 (aged 23)	2025	Dhaka Rangers FC
Forwards
7	M. S. Bablu	(Bangladesh)	LW/RW	27 November 1997 (aged 27)	2018	Team BJMC
9	Paulo Henrique	(Bangladesh)	CF	30 March 1991 (aged 34)	2025	(Bolivia) ABB
11	Md Rabby Hossen Rahul	(Bangladesh)	LW	30 December 2006 (aged 18)	2025	Bashundhara Kings
12	Sarower Zaman Nipu	(Bangladesh)	LW/RW/CF	5 June 2000 (aged 24)	2025	Dhaka Abahani
19	Ayush Ghalan	(Nepal)	RW	21 February 2004 (aged 21)	2025	(Nepal) Pokhara Thunders
24	Dipok Roy	(Bangladesh)	RW/LW/RWB	12 August 2002 (aged 22)	2024	Sheikh Russel KC
25	Md Yamin Rana	(Bangladesh)	CF		2025	Brothers Union
28	Amirul Islam	(Bangladesh)	CF	1 February 1988 (aged 37)	2025	Bangladesh Police FC
95	Sree Sumon Soren	(Bangladesh)	LW/LWB	11 June 2007 (aged 17)	2025	Brothers Union
97	Sanowar Hossain	(Bangladesh)	CF		2025	
99	Morshedul Islam	(Bangladesh)	CF/RW		2024	

== Transfer ==
=== In ===
No.	Pos	Player	Previous club	Fee	Date	Source
25	FW	Md Yamin Rana	Brothers Union	Free Transfer	15 July 2025	
55	DF	Riyadul Hasan Rafi	Mohammedan SC	Free Transfer	24 July 2025	
19	FW	Md Rabby Hossen Rahul	Bashundhara Kings	Free Transfer	25 July 2025	
20	MF	Moinul Islam Moin	Mohammedan SC	Free Transfer	31 July 2025	
19	FW	(Nepal) Ayush Ghalan	(Nepal) Pokhara Thunders	Free Transfer	8 August 2025	
18	MF	(The Gambia) Foday Darboe	(Oman) Sur SC	Free Transfer	8 August 2025	
8	MF	Suaibur Rahman Mijan	Dhaka Rangers FC	Free Transfer	10 August 2025	
9	FW	(Brazil) Paulo Henrique	(Bolivia) ABB	Free Transfer	10 August 2025	
10	MF	(Bhutan) Orgyen Tshering	(Bhutan) Thimphu City FC	Free Transfer	10 August 2025	
17	FW	Sarwar Zaman Nipu	Dhaka Abahani	Free Transfer	10 August 2025	
95	FW	Sree Sumon Soren	Brothers Union	Free Transfer	10 August 2025	
16	GK	(Nepal) Kiran Chemjong	Free agent	Free transfer	12 August 2025	
9	MF	(Uganda) Shafiq Kagimu	(North Macedonia) FK Rabotnichki	Free transfer	12 August 2025	
34	DF	Sharif Uddin Nirob	BFF Elite Academy	Free Transfer	12 August 2025	
12	DF	(Bhutan) Sherub Dorji	(Bhutan) RTC	Free Transfer	21 January 2026	
23	FW	(Nigeria) Moses Odo	(Sudan) Al Ahli SC (Wad Madani)	Free Transfer	2 February 2026	

=== Out ===
No.	Pos	Player	Moved to	Fee	Date	Source
55	FW	(Bangladesh) Mohammed Al-Amin	(Bangladesh) Dhaka Abahani	Free transfer	10 July 2025	
66	MF	(Uzbekistan) Jahongkir Qurbonboev	(Indonesia) PSPS Pekanbaru	Free Transfer	17 July 2025	
9	FW	(Paraguay) Luis Ibarra	(El Salvador) Zacatecoluca F.C.	Free Transfer	17 July 2025	
23	MF	(Bangladesh) Shah Quazem Kirmane	(Bangladesh) Dhaka Abahani	Free Transfer	20 July 2025	
12	FW	(Bangladesh) Arifur Rahman	(Bangladesh) Arambagh KS	Free Transfer	26 July 2025	
18	MF	(Bangladesh) Jayed Ahmed	(Bangladesh) Rahmatganj MFS	Free transfer	26 July 2025	
6	MF	(Bangladesh) Abu Shaeid	(Bangladesh) Brothers Union	Free transfer	5 August 2025	

== Friendlies ==
=== Pre-season ===
18 August 2025	Bangladesh	0–0	Bangladesh Police	Dhaka
18:00 UTC+6				Stadium: National Stadium

23 August 2025	Bashundhara Kings	2–0	Bangladesh Police	Dhaka
18:00 UTC+6	Cuba; Topu			Stadium: Bashundhara Kings Arena; Referee: Md Monir Dhali

29 August 2025	Bangladesh	1–1	Bangladesh Police	Dhaka
18:00 UTC+6	Mithu	Report	N/A	Stadium: National Stadium

30 August 2025	Bashundhara Kings	3–1	Bangladesh Police	Dhaka
20:30 UTC+6	Dorielton	Report	Nipu	Stadium: Bashundhara Kings; Referee: Bituraj Barua

6 September 2025	Bangladesh Police	1–0	Mohammedan	Dhaka
15:00 UTC+6	Moin	Report		Stadium: Rajarbagh Police Line Field

== Competitions ==
Win Draw Loss Fixtures

=== Overall ===
Competition	First match	Last match	Final Position
BFL	27 September 2025	23 May 2026	4th of 10
Federation Cup	23 September 2025	21 April 2026	Group stage

=== Overview ===
Competition	Record							
Competition	Pld	W	D	L	GF	GA	GD	Win %
BFL	18	6	9	3	19	15	+4	33.33
Federation Cup	4	2	0	2	6	8	−2	50.00
Total	22	8	9	5	25	23	+2	36.36

Source: Competitions

=== Premier League ===
==== League table ====
Pos	Team	Pld	W	D	L	GF	GA	GD	Pts	Qualification or relegation
2	Dhaka Abahani (Note: Bashundhara Kings and Dhaka Abahani will not be able to participate in the AFC Challenge League due to the risk of FIFA sanctions and the lack of an AFC club license.)	18	11	4	3	37	15	+22	37	
3	Fortis	18	10	5	3	31	13	+18	35	Qualification for the AFC; Challenge League qualifying stage
4	Bangladesh Police	18	6	9	3	19	15	+4	27	Qualification for the AFC; Challenge League qualifying stage
5	Mohammedan	18	6	5	7	27	20	+7	23	
6	Rahmatganj	18	6	5	7	21	25	−4	23	

Source: Soccerway
Rules for classification: 1) Points; 2) Goal difference; 3) Number of goals scored.

==== Results summary ====
Overall								Home						Away					
Pld	W	D	L	GF	GA	GD	Pts	W	D	L	GF	GA	GD	W	D	L	GF	GA	GD
18	6	9	3	19	13	+6	27	3	4	1	10	6	+4	3	5	2	9	7	+2

Source: Soccerway

==== Results by round ====
Round	1	2	3	4	5	6	7	8	9	10	11	12	13	14	15	16	17	18
Ground	A	H	A	A	H	A	H	A	H	H	A	A	H	A	H	A	H	A
Result	W	D	D	L	D	D	W	W	D	D	D	L	L	W	W	D	W	D
Position	2	4	4	6	6	6	4	4	4	4	5	5	5	4	4	4	4	4

Source: Matches
A = Away; H = Home; W = Win; D = Draw; L = Loss; P = Postponed

==== Matches ====
27 September 2025 1	Brothers Union	0–1	Bangladesh Police FC	Munshiganj
14:45 BST (UTC+6)	Y. Gurung (yellow card) 5'	Report	D. Roy (yellow card) 11'; P. Henrique 43'; A. Ghalan (yellow card) 49'; A. Hossain (yellow card) 67'	Stadium: Shaheed Bir Sreshtho Flight Lieutenant Matiur Rahman Stadium; Referee: Md Jalal Uddin

19 October 2025 2	Bangladesh Police FC	1–1	Mohammedan SC	Gazipur
14:45 BST (UTC+6)	P. Henrique (yellow card) 27'; A. Anik (yellow card) 43'; MS Bablu 49'	Report	R. Uddin 19'; M. Muzaffarov (yellow card) 27'	Stadium: Shaheed Barkat Stadium; Referee: Md Alamgir Sarker

24 November 2025 3	Fortis FC	0–0	Bangladesh Police FC	Dhaka
14:45 BST (UTC+6)		Report	Foday Darboe (yellow card) 67'	Stadium: Bashundhara Kings Arena; Referee: Mahmud Zamal Farouqee Nahid

28 November 2025 4	Dhaka Abahani	2–0	Bangladesh Police FC	Cumilla
14:45 BST (UTC+6)	S. Diabete 25' (pen.); P. Singh (yellow card) 36'; E. Gazi 43'; S. Morsalin (yellow card) 88'; A. Molla (red card) 90+1'	Report	Sharif Nirob (yellow card) 90+9'	Stadium: Shaheed Dhirendranath Datta Stadium; Referee: Bituraj Barua

6 December 2025 5	Bangladesh Police FC	1–1	Fakirerpool YMC	Gazipur
14:30 BST (UTC+6)	D. Quipapá (yellow card) 25'; O. Teshering (yellow card) 61'; I. Faysal 90+6'; P. Henrique (yellow card) 90+7'	Report	Mohammad Arian Hossain 31'; M. Kahraba (yellow card) 55'	Stadium: Shaheed Barkat Stadium; Referee: Mohammed Jalal Uddin

13 December 2025 6	PWD Sports Club	0–0	Bangladesh Police FC	Gazipur
14:30 BST (UTC+6)	A. Turaev (yellow card) 43'; Md Ratul (yellow card) 50'	Report	Foday Darboe (yellow card) 42'; Suaibur Rahman Mijan (yellow card) 74'	Stadium: Shaheed Barkat Stadium; Referee: Bhubon Mohon Torofdar

20 December 2025 7	Bangladesh Police FC	2–1	Bashundhara Kings	Gazipur
14:30 BST (UTC+6)	R. Rahul 3'; M. Mollah (yellow card) 10'; A. Ghalan (yellow card) 89'; S. Kagimu 90+2' (yellow card) 90+2'	Report	M. Ridoy (yellow card) 30'; F. Fahim 33'	Stadium: Shaheed Barkat Stadium; Referee: Md Jalal Uddin

26 December 2025 8	Arambagh KS	1–3	Bangladesh Police FC	Manikganj
14:30 BST (UTC+6)		Report	A. Ghalan 37', 52'; A. Islam 42'	Stadium: Shaheed Miraj–Tapan Stadium; Referee: Mahmud Zamal Farouqee Nahid

3 January 2026 9	Bangladesh Police FC	1–1	Rahmatganj MFS	Munshiganj
14:30 BST (UTC+6)	A. Islam (red card); P. Henrique 45'; Ismail Hossen (yellow card) 90+1'	Report	S. Kanform 16'	Stadium: Shaheed Bir Sreshtho Flight Lieutenant Matiur Rahman Stadium; Referee: Md Anisur Rahman

6 March 2026 10	Bangladesh Police FC	1–1	Brothers Union	Gazipur
14:45 BST (UTC+6)	P. Henrique 78'	Report	S. Dost 72'	Stadium: Shaheed Barkat Stadium; Referee: Md Alamgir Sarker

13 March 2026 11	Mohammedan SC	1–1	Bangladesh Police FC	Cumilla
14:45 BST (UTC+6)	M. Muzaffarov 42'; J. Shanto (yellow card) 48'; Saiful Hossain (yellow card) 52'	Report	P. Henrique 39' (pen.); M. Odo (yellow card) 60'	Stadium: Shaheed Dhirendranath Datta Stadium; Referee: Md Symoon Hasan Sany

11 April 2026 12	Bangladesh Police FC	0–2	Fortis FC	Gazipur
15:30 BST (UTC+6)		Report	Md Mithu Chowdhury 5'; P. Nova (yellow card) 37' (goal) 90+2'; Noyon Mia (yellow card) 55'; Kamcai Marma Aky (yellow card) 90'	Stadium: Shaheed Barkat Stadium; Referee: Tapash Roy

17 April 2026 13	Bangladesh Police FC	1–3	Dhaka Abahani	Manikganj
15:30 BST (UTC+6)	Sharif Uddin Nirob (yellow card) 23' (yellow-red card) 70'; M. Moin (yellow card) 43'; M. Bablu 45+2'; Foday Darboe (yellow card) 65'; M. Molla (yellow card) 86'	Report	S. Diabate (yellow card) 21'; E. Ogbugh 32'; Y. Khan (yellow card) 45+1'; Al-Amin 58'; S. Morsalin 78' (yellow card) 80' (yellow-red card) 85'; S. Tripura (yellow card) 90+7'	Stadium: Shaheed Barkat Stadium; Referee: Bituraj Barua

25 April 2026 14	Fakirerpool YMC	1–3	Bangladesh Police FC	Manikganj
15:30 BST (UTC+6)	Pronoy Innocent Marandi (yellow card) 6'; Md Mehedi Hasan Hridoy (yellow card) 45+1'; Md Shadin 60'	Report	P. Henrique 6', 40'; Ismail Hossen (yellow card) 22'; S. Kagimu 78'; Anik Hossain (yellow card) 81'	Stadium: Shaheed Miraj-Tapan Stadium

1 May 2026 15	Bangladesh Police FC	1–0	PWD Sports Club	Gazipur
15:30 BST (UTC+6)	I. Faysal (yellow card) 65'; D. Quipapá 90+10'	Report	Jonathan Santana (yellow card) 33' (yellow-red card) 61'; Marat Devessa Tareck (penalty missed) 46'; A. Uzair (yellow card) 77'	Stadium: Shaheed Barkat Stadium; Referee: Md Alamgir Sarker

8 May May 2026 16	Bashundhara Kings	1–1	Bangladesh Police FC	Dhaka
15:30 BST (UTC+6)	Dori 35'; (yellow card) 45+2'; R. Hossain (yellow card) 45' (red card) 90+66'; S. Rana (yellow card) 53'; S. Uddin (yellow card) 90+72'	Report	M. Molla (yellow card) 6'; P. Henrique 53' (yellow card) 54' (yellow-red card) 63'; Shamim Ahmed (yellow card) 90+74'	Stadium: Bashundhara Kings Arena; Referee: Md Nasrir Uddin

15 May 2026 17	Bangladesh Police FC	2–0	Arambagh KS	Gazipur
15:45 BST (UTC+6)	Ismail Hossen (yellow card) 21'; M. Rahul 54'; Foday Darboe (yellow card) 75'; S. Kagimu 90+13'	Report	Apu Ahammad (yellow card) 4'	Stadium: Shaheed Barkat Stadium; Referee: Md Junayed Sharif

23 May 2026 18	Rahmatganj MFS	0–0	Bangladesh Police FC	Munshiganj
15:45 BST (UTC+6)	M. Royal (yellow card) 42'; R. Islam (yellow card) 45+4'; Andrews Kwadwo Appau (yellow card) 56'	Report	M. Molla (yellow card) 47'; P. Henrique (penalty missed) 56'	Stadium: Shaheed Bir Sreshtho Flight Lieutenant Matiur Rahman Stadium; Referee: Md Symoon Hasan Sany

=== Group B ===
Pos	Team	Pld	W	D	L	GF	GA	GD	Pts	Qualification
1	Bashundhara Kings	4	2	2	0	10	2	+8	8	Qualified for QRF 1
2	Mohammedan SC	4	2	2	0	8	3	+5	8	Advanced to QRF 2
3	Bangladesh Police	4	2	0	2	6	8	−2	6	
4	Fortis FC	4	1	2	1	7	4	+3	5	
5	Arambagh KS	4	0	0	4	0	14	−14	0	

Source: Sofascore

23 September 2025	Bangladesh Police FC	2–3	Mohammedan SC	Comilla
14:45 BST (UTC+6)	I. Faysal 9'; D. Quipapá 30'	Report	S. Boateng 11', 47', 73'	Stadium: Shaheed Dhirendranath Datta Stadium; Referee: Md Anisur Rahman Sagor

2 December 2025	Arambagh KS	0–1	Bangladesh Police FC	Dhaka
14:30 BST (UTC+6)		Report	P. Henrique 79'	Stadium: Bashundhara Kings Arena; Referee: Bhubon Mohon Tarafder

7 April 2026	Bangladesh Police FC	2–1	Fortis FC	Dhaka
14:30 BST (UTC+6)	S. Kagimu 66'; M. Rahul 79'	Report	O. Okafor 37'	Stadium: Bashundhara Kings Arena; Referee: Md Symoon Hasan Sany

17 February 2026	Bangladesh Police FC	1–4	Bashundhara Kings	Dhaka
14:45 BST (UTC+6)	M. Bablu 90+2'	Report	Dorielton 45+8', 52', 83', 88'	Stadium: Bashundhara Kings Arena; Referee: Mahmud Zamal Faruqee Nahid

== Statistics ==
=== Goalscorers ===
As of 23 May 2026

Rank	Player	Position	Total	BFL	Federation Cup
1	(Brazil) Paulo Henrique	FW	7	6	1
2	(Uganda) Shafiq Kagimu	MF	4	3	1
3	(Bangladesh) M. S. Bablu	MF	3	2	1
3	(Bangladesh) Rabby Hossen Rahul	FW	3	2	1
4	(Bangladesh) Isa Faysal	DF	2	1	1
4	(Brazil) Danilo Quipapá	DF	1	1	1
5	(Bangladesh) Amirul Islam	FW	1	1	0
5	(Nepal) Ayush Ghalan	FW	1	1	0
Total			23	17	6
