= Moinul Islam Moin =

Bangladeshi footballer (born 2005)

Personal information
- Full name: Mohammed Moinul Islam Moin
- Date of birth: 18 February 2005 (age 21)
- Place of birth: Barisal, Bangladesh
- Position: Attacking midfielder

Team information
- Current team: Bangladesh Police
- Number: 18

Youth career
- –2018: Muladi FA

Senior career*
Years	Team	Apps	(Gls)
2020–2022	Uttara	38	(19)
2022–2025	Mohammedan	9	(0)
2025–	Bangladesh Police	13	(0)

International career^{‡}
2018–2019	Bangladesh U17	6	(8)
2022–2024	Bangladesh U20	16	(2)
Medal record
Men's football
Representing Bangladesh
SAFF U-17 Championship
Winner	2018 Nepal	Team
SAFF U-20 Championship
Runner-up	2022 India	Team
Winner	2024 Nepal	Team
- * Club domestic league appearances and goals as of 25 May 2026 ‡ National team caps and goals as of 29 September 2024

Moinul Islam Moin (Bengali: মইনুল ইসলাম মঈন; born 18 February 2005) is a Bangladeshi professional footballer who plays as an attacking midfielder for Bangladesh Football League club Bangladesh Police.

== Early career ==
Moinul Islam Moin was born on 18 February 2005 in Muladi, Barisal. The eldest among two brothers and three sisters, Moin completed HSC from Baptist Mission Boys High School in 2022. He trained under the local coach Ziaul Ahsan Khan at the Muladi Football Academy before being selected by the Bangladesh U15 team for the 2018 SAFF U-15 Championship in Nepal. In 2019, Moin represented his high school at the Clear Men Under-17 School Football Tournament and was selected among the best six players of the tournament, gaining the opportunity to train with the English club Manchester City. However, this opportunity did not come to fruition due to the COVID-19 pandemic. In March 2020, Moin won the best player award of the Bangabandhu Under-17 Gold Cup Football Tournament, where 98,730 footballers participated from all over the country. His team, Barisal Division, was crowned champions, defeating Chittagong Division 2–1.

== Club career ==
=== Uttara FC ===
In 2021, Moin joined Uttara FC for the 2020–21 Bangladesh Championship League. He made his professional league debut on 7 February 2022 against NoFeL SC. In the following league game, held eight days later, Moin scored his first professional league goal in a 1–1 draw with Dhaka City FC. His first season at the cub saw him make 17 appearances while scoring a single goal. Moin began the 2021–22 Bangladesh Championship League season with goals against Dhaka Wanderers and Agrani Bank SC in the league's first two matches. He finished the first phase with 10 goals from 11 games. His best performance during the second phase came during 3–2 victory over BFF Elite Academy on 3 June 2022. During the game he scored a brace, with his first goal coming from a free-kick to open the scoring while his second goal being the winner, a curling effort resulting from a throw-in. Moin finished the season as league top scorer with 18 goals from 21 games.

=== Mohammedan SC ===
In July 2022, Moin joined Mohammedan SC in the Bangladesh Premier League. On 17 November 2022, Moin made his club debut against Fortis FC as a substitute during a 3–1 victory in the 2022–23 Independence Cup. On 10 February 2023, he made his league debut as a substitute against AFC Uttara during a 6–0 victory.

== International career ==
=== Youth ===
Moin spent the entirety of the 2018 SAFF U-15 Championship on the bench and was later left out of the under-15 team for the 2018 UEFA Assist U-15 Development Tournament and 2019 SAFF U-15 Championship. In September 2019, English coach Rob Ryles included Moin in the squad for the 2020 AFC U-16 Championship qualifiers held in Doha, Qatar. On 20 September 2019, he scored his first international goal against Bhutan U16 during the qualifiers.

During the 2019 UEFA Assist U-16 Development Tournament held in Dhaka, Bangladesh, Moin scored a brace against both Cambodia U16 and Faroe Islands U16. On 20 October 2019, he scored a hat-trick against Maldives U16 as Bangladesh were crowned undefeated champions. Moin also ended the tournament as top scorer with 7 goals from 3 games.

In 2022, Moin represented the Bangladesh U20 team during all 5 games in the 2022 SAFF U-20 Championship, as Bangladesh finished tournament runners-up for the third consecutive time, following their 2–5 defeat to hosts India U20. He also represented the team during the 2023 AFC U-20 Asian Cup qualifiers in Arad, Bahrain, later that year. In 2023, Moin was appointed captain of the Bangladesh U19 team for the 2023 SAFF U-19 Championship held in Kathmandu, Nepal.

== Personal life ==
In 2023, Moin gained admission into American International University-Bangladesh as part of its sports quota. He represented his university during the Ispahani Prothom Alo Inter University Football Tournament, scoring a hat-trick against BGMEA University of Fashion & Technology during an 8–1 victory.

== Career statistics ==
=== Club ===
As of 27 May 2025.

Appearances and goals by club, season and competition
Club	Season	League			Domestic Cup (Note: Appearance(s) in Bangladesh Federation Cup)		Other (Note: Appearance(s) in Bangladesh Independence Cup)		Continental		Total	
Club	Season	Division	Apps	Goals	Apps	Goals	Apps	Goals	Apps	Goals	Apps	Goals
Uttara	2020–21	BCL	17	1	—		—		—		17	1
Uttara	2021–22	BCL	21	18	—		—		—		21	18
Uttara	Total		38	19	0	0	0	0	0	0	38	19
Mohammedan	2022–23	BFL	3	0	1	0	1	0	—		5	0
Mohammedan	2023–24	BFL	1	0	2	0	1	0	—		4	0
Mohammedan	2024–25	BFL	5	0	3	2	—		—		8	2
Mohammedan	Total		9	0	6	2	2	0	0	0	17	2
Bangladesh Police	2025–26	BFL	0	0	0	0	0	0	—		0	0
Career total			47	19	6	2	2	0	0	0	55	21

=== International goals ===
==== Youth ====
Scores and results list Bangladesh's goal tally first.

No.	Date	Venue	Opponent	Score	Result	Competition
1.	20 September 2019	Doha, Aspire Dome, Qatar	Bhutan	3–0	3–0	2020 AFC U-16 Championship qualification
2.	16 October 2019	Dhaka, Bangabandhu National Stadium, Bangladesh	Cambodia	1–0	2–0	UEFA Assist U-16 Development Tournament
3.	16 October 2019	Dhaka, Bangabandhu National Stadium, Bangladesh	Cambodia	2–0	2–0	UEFA Assist U-16 Development Tournament
4.	18 October 2019	Dhaka, Bangabandhu National Stadium, Bangladesh	Faroe Islands	2–0	3–1	UEFA Assist U-16 Development Tournament
5.	18 October 2019	Dhaka, Bangabandhu National Stadium, Bangladesh	Faroe Islands	3–1	3–1	UEFA Assist U-16 Development Tournament
6.	20 October 2019	Dhaka, Bangabandhu National Stadium, Bangladesh	Maldives	4–0	6–0	UEFA Assist U-16 Development Tournament
7.	20 October 2019	Dhaka, Bangabandhu National Stadium, Bangladesh	Maldives	5–0	6–0	UEFA Assist U-16 Development Tournament
8.	20 October 2019	Dhaka, Bangabandhu National Stadium, Bangladesh	Maldives	6–0	6–0	UEFA Assist U-16 Development Tournament
9.	23 September 2024	Haiphong, Lạch Tray Stadium, Vietnam	Guam	2–1	2–2	2025 AFC U-20 Asian Cup qualification
10.	29 September 2024	Haiphong, Lạch Tray Stadium, Vietnam	Bhutan	2–1	2–1	2025 AFC U-20 Asian Cup qualification
Last updated 29 September 2024

== Honours ==
Mohammedan SC

- Federation Cup: 2022–23

Bangladesh U-20

- SAFF U-20 Championship: 2024

Bangladesh U-16

- UEFA Assist U-16 Development Tournament: 2019

Bangladesh U-15

- SAFF U-15 Championship: 2018

Individual

- 2019 – UEFA Assist U-16 Development Tournament Top Scorer Award
- 2020 – Bangabandhu U-17 Gold Cup Football Tournament Best Player Award
- 2021–22 – Bangladesh Championship League Top Scorer Award
