= Vitorović =

Vitorović (sometimes transliterated Vitorovich, Serbian Cyrillic: Виторовић) is a Serbian surname that is most widespread in Čajetina and Nova Varoš.

Notable people with this surname include:

- Nicolas Vitorović (born 1990), Cypriot professional football coach and former player
