= 2017 SAFF U-18 Championship =

Tournament details
- Host country: Bhutan
- Dates: 18–27 September
- Teams: 5 (from 1 confederation)
- Venue: Changlimithang Stadium (in Thimphu host cities)

Final positions
- Champions: Nepal (2nd title)
- Runners-up: Bangladesh
- Third place: India

Tournament statistics
- Matches played: 10
- Goals scored: 26 (2.6 per match)
- Attendance: 38,737 (3,874 per match)
- Top scorer(s): (Bangladesh) Jafar Iqbal (5 goals)
- Best player: (Bhutan) Orgyen Tshering
- Fair play award: Bhutan

The 2017 SAFF U-18 Championship was the 2nd edition of the SAFF U-18 Championship, an international football competition for men's under-18 national teams organized by SAFF. But since most teams use to send their U-18 team keeping in mind 2018 AFC U-19 Championship qualification it has been officially changed to U-18 tournament. The tournament was hosted by Bhutan 18–27 September 2017.

It was the first time that Bhutan was hosting SAFF event.

== Host selection ==
A draw for tournament ceremony was held on 10 July 2017 at conference room of Bangladesh Football Federation.

SAFF general secretary Anwarul Haque Helal and BFF general secretary Abu Nayeem Shohag, were among others present on the occasion.

== Player eligibility ==
Players born on or after 1 January 1999 are eligible to compete in the tournament.

== Participating teams ==
On 6 September 2017 it was announced that Sri Lanka withdrew from the tournament whereas Pakistan didn't take part due to internal turmoil.

Team	Appearances in the SAFF U-18 Championship	Previous best performance
Bangladesh	2nd	Semi finals (2015)
Bhutan (Host)	2nd	Group Stage
India	2nd	Runners-Up (2015)
Maldives	2nd	Group Stage
Nepal	2nd	Champion (2015)

== Venue ==
Thimphu
Changlimithang Stadium
Capacity: 25,000
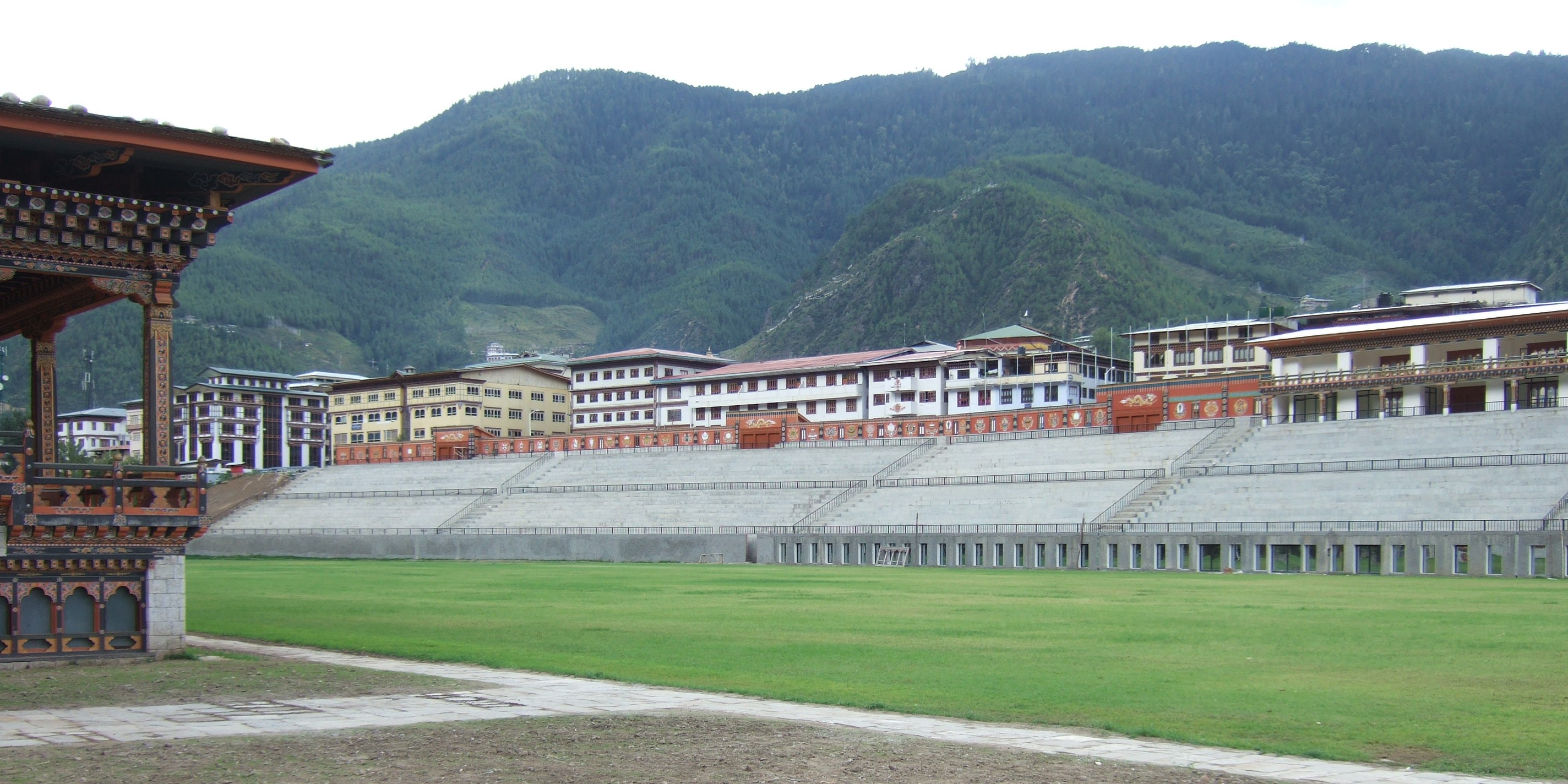

== Match officials ==
Referees

- (Bangladesh) Abdur Rahman Dhali
- (Bhutan) Ugyen Dorji
- (India) Pratik Mondal
- (Maldives) Hussain Sinan
- (Nepal) Laba Khatri
- (Sri Lanka) Farook M. Irshad

Assistant Referees

- (Bangladesh) Mohammad Shah Alam
- (Bhutan) Phurpa Wangchuk
- (India) Mohan Ravi
- (Bhutan) Karma Yeshi
- (Nepal) Padam Bahadur Bhujel
- (Sri Lanka) Sampath Liyanagunawardena

Referee Supervisor

- (Bangladesh) Tayeb Hasan Shamsuzzaman

== Format ==
After Sri Lanka U18 opted out from the event. Now the championship will be played on round robin basis. Each team will face every other team once respectively and the team with the most points will win the title.

== Standings ==
- All matches are played in Thimphu, Bhutan.
- Times listed are UTC+06:00.

Key to colours in group tables
Champion

Pos	Team	Pld	W	D	L	GF	GA	GD	Pts	Status
1	Nepal (C)	4	3	0	1	6	2	+4	9 (Note: Nepal ahead of Bangladesh on head-to-head points: Bangladesh 1–2 Nepal)	Champion
2	Bangladesh	4	3	0	1	9	5	+4	9	
3	India	4	2	0	2	8	7	+1	6	
4	Bhutan (H)	4	2	0	2	2	5	−3	6	
5	Maldives	4	0	0	4	1	7	−6	0	

Source: Futbol24
Rules for classification: 1) points; 2) head-to-head points; 3) head-to-head goal difference; 4) goal difference; 5) number of goals scored;
(C) Champions; (H) Hosts
Notes:
18 September 2017
16:00 UTC+06:00

Bangladesh	4–3	India
Jafar 55', 90+1'; Rahmat 60'; Sufil 74'	Report	18' Lalawmpuia; 32' (pen.) Lalrindika; 47' Rebello

Changlimithang Stadium, Thimphu
Attendance: 4,633
Referee: Farook M. Irshad (Sri Lanka)

18 September 2017
19:00 UTC+06:00

Maldives	0–1	Bhutan
	Report	52' Orgyen

Changlimithang Stadium, Thimphu
Attendance: 3,719
Referee: Abdur Rahman Dhali (Bangladesh)

20 September 2017
16:00 UTC+06:00

Bhutan	1–0	Nepal
Orgyen 87' (pen.)

Changlimithang Stadium, Thimphu
Attendance: 1,800
Referee: Hussain Sinan (Maldives)

20 September 2017
19:00 UTC+06:00

Maldives	0–2	Bangladesh
		9' Saikot Mahmoud Munna; 45' Jafar

Changlimithang Stadium, Thimphu
Attendance: 1,559
Referee: Ugyen Dorji (Bhutan)

22 September 2017
16:00 UTC+06:00

Nepal	2–0	Maldives
Limbu 7'; Rejin 57'

Changlimithang Stadium, Thimphu
Attendance: 6511
Referee: Pratik Mondal (India)

22 September 2017
19:00 UTC+06:00

India	3–0	Bhutan
Lalawmpuia 38', 78'; Asish 90+1'

Changlimithang Stadium, Thimphu
Attendance: 4,400
Referee: Laba Khatri (Nepal)

25 September 2017
16:00 UTC+06:00

India	2–1	Maldives
Princeton Rebello 37'; Abhishek 41'	Report	18' Tholal

Changlimithang Stadium, Thimphu
Attendance: 3,274
Referee: Abdur Rahman Dhali (Bangladesh)

25 September 2017
19:00 UTC+06:00

Bangladesh	1–2	Nepal
Al-Amin 30'		22' Rijal; 80' Limbu

Changlimithang Stadium, Thimphu
Attendance: 2,513
Referee: Farook M. Irshad (Sri Lanka)

27 September 2017
16:00 UTC+06:00

Bhutan	0–2	Bangladesh
		83', 90' Jafar

Changlimithang Stadium, Thimphu
Attendance: 4,140
Referee: Laba Khatri (Nepal)

27 September 2017
19:00 UTC+06:00

Nepal	2–0	India
Dinesh 2', 37'

Changlimithang Stadium, Thimphu
Attendance: 6,188
Referee: Ugyen Dorji (Bhutan)

== Winner ==
2nd SAFF U-18 Championship 2017

Nepal
Second title

== Awards ==
The following awards were given for the 2017 SAFF U-18 Championship.

FIFA Fair Play Award	Golden Boot Award
Bhutan	(Bangladesh) Jafar Iqbal

== Goalscorers ==
5 Goals

- (Bangladesh) Jafar Iqbal

3 Goals

- (India) Lalawmpuia

2 Goals

- (Bhutan) Orgyen Tshering
- (India) Princeton Rebello
- (Nepal) Roman Limbu
- (Nepal) Dinesh Henjan

1 Goal

- (Bangladesh) Saikot Mahmoud Munna
- (Bangladesh) Rahmat Mia
- (Bangladesh) Mahbubur Rahman Sufil
- (India) Edmund Lalrindika
- (India) Asish Rai
- (Nepal) Rejin Subba
- (Maldives) Ahmed Tholal
- (India) Abhishek Halder
- (Nepal) Abhishek Rijal
- (Bangladesh) Mohammad Al-Amin
