= 2024–25 Federation Cup (Bangladesh) Group A =

Group A of the 2024–25 Federation Cup took place from 3 December 2024 to 31 January 2025. The group consisted of defending champions of previous tournaments Bashundhara Kings, Bangladesh Police, Fortis FC, Brothers Union and Dhaka Wanderers. The top two teams, Bashundhara Kings and Brothers Union, advanced to the qualification round to the final.

== Teams ==
Draw position	Team	Appearances	Previous best performance
A1	Bashundhara Kings	6th	Champions (2019–20, 2020–21, 2023–24)
A2	Bangladesh Police	6th	Semi-finals (2019–20, 2023–24)
A3	Fortis FC	3rd	Group stages (2022–23)
A4	Brothers Union	34th	Champions (1980, 1991, 2005)
A5	Dhaka Wanderers	TBC	Runners-up (1987)

== Standings ==
Pos	Team	Pld	W	D	L	GF	GA	GD	Pts	Qualification
1	Bashundhara Kings	4	3	0	1	9	4	+5	9	Qualified for QRF 1
2	Brothers Union	4	2	1	1	9	1	+8	7	Advanced to QRF 2
3	Fortis	4	2	1	1	5	1	+4	7	
4	Bangladesh Police	4	1	2	1	4	4	0	5	
5	Dhaka Wanderers	4	0	0	4	1	18	−17	0	

Source: Soccerway
Rules for classification: Group stages tiebreakers

== Venues ==
The matches are being played at these three venues across the country.

Cumilla	Dhaka	Mymensingh
Shaheed Dhirendranath Datta Stadium	Bashundhara Kings Arena	Rafiq Uddin Bhuiyan Stadium
Capacity: 18,000	Capacity: 6,000	Capacity: 25,000
Matches: 4	Matches: 3	Matches: 3
2024–25 Federation Cup (Bangladesh) Group A is located in Bangladesh

== Matches ==
3 December 2024
14:30
Match 1

Bashundhara Kings	1–0	Brothers Union
Topu 69'	Report

Shaheed Dhirendranath Datta Stadium, Cumilla
Referee: Golam Mourshed Chowdhury Nayon
Man of the Match: Topu Barman (Bashundhara Kings)
3 December 2024
14:30
Match 2

Bangladesh Police	0–0	Fortis
	Report

Rafiq Uddin Bhuiyan Stadium, Mymensingh
Referee: Mahmud Zamal Farouqee Nahid
Man of the Match: Rakibul Islam Tushar (Bangladesh Police)

17 December 2024
14:30
Match 5

Bashundhara Kings	0–2	Fortis
	Report	Jasur Jumaev 72'; Abdullah 80'

Bashundhara Kings Arena, Dhaka
Referee: Md Alamgir Sarker
Man of the Match: Mohammad Abdullah (Fortis)
17 December 2024
14:30
Match 6

Brothers Union	8–0	Dhaka Wanderers
Rabbi 8'; Mustapha Drammeh 24', 65', 70'; Sazzad 28', 48', 81'; Kingsley 90+3'	Report

Rafiq Uddin Bhuiyan Stadium, Mymensingh
Referee: Md Nazmul Huda
Man of the Match: Sazzad Hossain (Brothers Union)

31 December 2024
14:30
Match 9

Fortis	3–0	Dhaka Wanderers
Joy Kumar 45+2', 75'; Nova 89'	Report

Shaheed Dhirendranath Datta Stadium, Cumilla
Referee: Md Jalal Uddin
Man of the Match: Joy Kumar (Fortis)
31 December 2024
14:30
Match 10

Bangladesh Police	2–3	Bashundhara Kings
Al Amin 7', 54'	Report	Topu 6'; Miguel 10'; Fernandes 53'

Bashundhara Kings Arena, Dhaka
Referee: Jasim Akhter
Man of the Match: Miguel Figueira (Bashundhara Kings)

14 January 2025
14:30
Match 13

Bangladesh Police	2–1	Dhaka Wanderers
M. Rabby 84'; Esanur Rahman 86'	Report	Emon 42' (pen.)

Bashundhara Kings Arena, Dhaka
Referee: Anisur Rahman Sagor
Man of the Match: Mannaf Rabby (Bangladesh Police)
14 January 2025
14:30
Match 14

Brothers Union	1–0	Fortis FC
Rabbi 35'	Report

Shaheed Dhirendranath Datta Stadium, Cumilla
Referee: Md Jalal Uddin
Man of the Match: Ashraful Islam Rana (Brothers Union)

28 January 2025
14:45
Match 17

Bangladesh Police	0–0	Brothers Union
	Report

Rafiq Uddin Bhuiyan Stadium, Mymensingh
Referee: Md Nasir Uddin
Man of the Match: Rakibul Islam Tushar (Bangladesh Police)
28 January 2025
14:45
Match 18

Bashundhara Kings	5–0	Dhaka Wanderers
Miguel 18'; Sohel Sr. 40'; Rasel 55' (o.g.); Sohel Jr. 70'; Topu 77'	Report

Shaheed Dhirendranath Datta Stadium, Cumilla
Referee: Bhubon Mohon Torafder
Man of the Match: Topu Barman (Bashundhara Kings)

== See also ==
- 2024–25 Federation Cup (Bangladesh) Group B
