= Jahid Hasan =

Bangladeshi footballer

Personal information
- Full name: Mohammed Jahid Hasan
- Date of birth: 1 June 2002 (age 24)
- Place of birth: Benapole, Jessore, Bangladesh
- Height: 1.80 m (5 ft 11 in)
- Position: Left-back

Team information
- Current team: Bangladesh Police
- Number: 27

Youth career
- 2012–2017: Alhaj Nur Islam FA

Senior career*
Years	Team	Apps	(Gls)
2018–2019	Farashganj		
2020–2021	Arambagh	18	(0)
2022–2023	Mohammedan	8	(0)
2023–2026	Bashundhara Kings	11	(0)
2026–	Bangladesh Police	5	(0)
- * Club domestic league appearances and goals as of 24 October 2026

Jahid Hasan (Bengali: জাহিদ হাসান; born 1 June 2002) is a Bangladeshi professional footballer who plays as a left-back for Bangladesh Premier League club Bangladesh Police.

== Club career ==
Jahid began his career with his hometown club Alhaj Nur Islam Football Academy under coach Sabbir Ahmed Palash. He also participated in the Pioneer Football League with the club in 2017. He made his professional league debut with Farashganj SC during the 2018–19 Bangladesh Championship League.

He made his Bangladesh Premier League debut with Arambagh KS during the 2020–21 league season. After his club's relegation that season, Jahid was among 13 footballers banned by BFF for three years due to match-fixing. Eventually, the BFF abided by the one-year ban imposed on the players by FIFA on 3 February 2022.

== International career ==
Jahid was a late inclusion to the Bangladesh U23 team for the 2022 Asian Games in Hangzhou, China.

== Honours ==
Mohammedan SC

- Federation Cup: 2022–23

Bashundhara Kings

- Bangladesh Premier League: 2023–24
- Independence Cup: 2023–24
