= 2019–20 Bangladesh Premier League (football) =

12th professional season of the top-flight football league in Bangladesh

Bangladesh Premier League
- Season: 2019–20
- Dates: 13 February – 15 March 2020
- Champions: Not awarded
- Relegated: No relegation
- Matches: 36
- Goals: 95 (2.64 per match)
- Top goalscorer: 5 goals Eleta Kingsley (Arambagh KS); Sunday Chizoba (Dhaka Abahani)
- Biggest home win: Dhaka Abahani 4–0 Dhaka Mohammedan (4 March 2020)
- Biggest away win: Uttar Baridhara SC 1–4 Dhaka Mohammedan (14 March 2020)
- Highest scoring: Bashundhara Kings 3–4 Chittagong Abahani (15 March 2020)
- Longest winning run: Sheikh Jamal Dhanmondi Club (4 matches)
- Longest unbeaten run: Sheikh Jamal Dhanmondi Club (4 matches)
- Longest winless run: Brothers Union (5 matches)
- Longest losing run: Muktijoddha Sangsad KC (3 matches)

The 2019–20 Bangladesh Premier League was the 12th season of the Bangladesh Premier League since its establishment in 2007. A total of 13 football clubs competed in the league, and Bashundhara Kings were the defending champions. Bangladesh Police FC and Uttar Baridhara SC entered as the promoted teams from the 2018–19 Bangladesh Championship League.

The season began on 13 February 2020 and was suspended on 15 March 2020, due to the COVID-19 pandemic in Bangladesh. On 17 May 2020, the league was declared void by the BFF executive committee.

== Effects of the 2020 coronavirus pandemic ==
On 16 March 2020, all sorts of sports activities in Bangladesh were postponed until March 31 as a precaution to combat the spread of coronavirus in the country, according to a press release issued by the Ministry of Youth and Sports.

Bangladesh Football Federation (BFF) postponed all Bangladesh Premier League and Women's Football League matches until March 31.

On 17 May 2020, The BFF executive committee, following an emergency meeting, declared the 12th edition of the league abandoned, scrapping promotion and relegation while cancelling the Independence Cup from the calendar.

== Teams ==
=== Stadiums and locations ===
Locations of the 2019–20 Bangladesh Premier League teams

| Team | Location | Stadium | Capacity |
|---|---|---|---|
| Arambagh KS | Dhaka | Bangabandhu National Stadium | 36,000 |
| Bangladesh Police FC | Dhaka | Bangabandhu National Stadium | 36,000 |
| Bashundhara Kings | Nilphamari | Sheikh Kamal Stadium | 20,000 |
| Brothers Union | Dhaka | Bangabandhu National Stadium | 36,000 |
| Chittagong Abahani Ltd. | Chattogram | MA Aziz Stadium | 30,000 |
| Dhaka Abahani Ltd. | Dhaka | Bangabandhu National Stadium | 36,000 |
| Dhaka Mohammedan SC Ltd. | Comilla | Shaheed Dhirendranath Stadium | 8,000 |
| Lt. Sheikh Jamal Dhanmondi Club Ltd. | Dhaka | Bangabandhu National Stadium | 30,000 |
| Muktijoddha Sangsad KC | Gopalganj | Sheikh Fazlul Haque Mani Stadium | 5,000 |
| Rahmatganj MFS | Dhaka | Bangabandhu National Stadium | 36,000 |
| Saif Sporting Club | Mymensingh | Rafiq Uddin Bhuiyan Stadium | 12,000 |
| Sheikh Russel KC | Sylhet | Sylhet District Stadium | 25,000 |
| Uttar Baridhara SC | Dhaka | Bangabandhu National Stadium | 36,000 |

=== Personnel and sponsoring ===
| Team | Head coach | Captain | Shirt sponsor | Kit manufacturer |
|---|---|---|---|---|
| Arambagh KS | (Bangladesh) Sheikh Jahidur Rahman | (Bangladesh) Didarul Houqe | | |
| Bangladesh Police FC | (Cyprus) Nicolas Vitorović | (Bangladesh) Nazmul Islam Rasel | Nasir Group | |
| Bashundhara Kings | (Spain) Óscar Bruzón | (Costa Rica) Daniel Colindres | Bashundhara Group | Club manufactured kit |
| Brothers Union | (Germany) Reza Parkas | (Bangladesh) Faisal Mahmud | Biswas Builders Limited | |
| Chittagong Abahani Limited | (Bangladesh) Maruful Haque | (Ivory Coast) Didier Brossou | Saif Power Battery | Noor Enterprise |
| Dhaka Abahani Limited | (Portugal) Mário Lemos | (Bangladesh) Nabib Newaj Jibon | | |
| Dhaka Mohammedan SC Limited | (England) Sean Brendan Lane | (Japan) Uryu Nagata | | |
| Lt.Sheikh Jamal Dhanmondi Club Limited | (Bangladesh) Shafiqul Islam Manik | (The Gambia) Solomon King Kanform | | |
| Muktijoddha Sangsad KC | (Bangladesh) Abdul Qaium Sentu | (Japan) Norito Hashiguchi | | |
| Rahmatganj MFS | (Bangladesh) Syed Golam Jilani | (The Gambia) Momodou Bah | Tiger Cement | |
| Saif Sporting Club | (Croatia) Drago Mamić | (Bangladesh) Jamal Bhuyan | Saif Power Battery | |
| Sheikh Russel KC | (Bangladesh) Saiful Bari Titu | (Bangladesh) Ashraful Islam Rana | Bashundhara Cement | |
| Uttar Baridhara SC | (Bangladesh) Alfaz Ahmed | (The Gambia) Landing Darboe | Saif Power Battery | |

== Foreign players ==
| Other foreign players. |
| AFC quota players. |
| No foreign player registered. |

Bold names refer to international players who have already played or are still playing.

Note :
(substituted off) : players who released during summer transfer window;
(substituted on) : players who registered during summer transfer window.

| Club | Leg | Player 1 | Player 2 | Player 3 | Player 4 | Player 5 |
|---|---|---|---|---|---|---|
| Arambagh KS | First | (Cameroon) Mickael Yonta | (Egypt) Mostafa Kahraba | (Nigeria) Eleta Benjamin Jr. | (Nigeria) Eleta Kingsley | |
| Arambagh KS | Second | | | | | |
| Bangladesh Police FC | First | (Bulgaria) Antonio Laskov | (Kyrgyzstan) Aidar Mambetaliev | (Kyrgyzstan) Artur Muladjanov | (Montenegro) Luka Rotković | (Puerto Rico) Sidney Rivera |
| Bangladesh Police FC | Second | | | | | |
| Bashundhara Kings | First | (Argentina) Nicolás Delmonte | (Costa Rica) Daniel Colindres | (Kyrgyzstan) Bakhtiyar Duyshobekov | (Lebanon) Mohamad Jalal Kdouh (substituted off) | (Tajikistan) Akhtam Nazarov |
| Bashundhara Kings | Second | | | | (Argentina) Hernán Barcos (substituted on) | |
| Brothers Union | First | (Cameroon) Jean Jules Ikanga | (Ivory Coast) Lancine Touré | (Nigeria) Kingsley Chigozie | (Uzbekistan) Otabek Valijonov | (Uzbekistan) Tuychibaev Murodjon |
| Brothers Union | Second | | | | | |
| Chittagong Abahani Ltd. | First | (Brazil) Nixon Guylherme | (Ivory Coast) Didier Brossou | (Nigeria) Matthew Chinedu | (Uzbekistan) Ikbol Bobohonov | (Uzbekistan) Shukurali Pulatov |
| Chittagong Abahani Ltd. | Second | | | | | |
| Dhaka Abahani Ltd. | First | (Brazil) Maílson Alves | (Egypt) Alaaeldin Nasr Elmagraby | (Haiti) Kervens Belfort | (Kyrgyzstan) Edgar Bernhardt | (Nigeria) Sunday Chizoba |
| Dhaka Abahani Ltd. | Second | | | | | |
| Dhaka Mohammedan SC Ltd. | First | (Japan) Uryu Nagata | (Mali) Souleymane Diabate | (Mali) Ousmane Berthe | (Nigeria) Stanley Onyekachi Amadi | (Nigeria) Ugochukwu Obi Moneke |
| Dhaka Mohammedan SC Ltd. | Second | | | | | |
| Lt. Sheikh Jamal Dhanmondi Club Ltd. | First | (The Gambia) Omar Jobe | (The Gambia) Solomon King Konform | (Ivory Coast) Ballo Famoussa | (Japan) Yusuke Kato | (Nigeria) Monday Osagie |
| Lt. Sheikh Jamal Dhanmondi Club Ltd. | Second | | | | | |
| Muktijoddha Sangsad KC | First | (Brazil) Albert Frank | (Cameroon) Paul Emile Biyaga | (Guinea) Ismael Bangoura | (Japan) Norito Hashiguchi | (Nigeria) Cyril Oriaku |
| Muktijoddha Sangsad KC | Second | | | | | |
| Rahmatganj MFS | First | (The Gambia) Momodou Bah | (Guinea) Younoussa Camara | (Nigeria) Kastan Igwe | (Tajikistan) Siyovush Asrorov | (Uzbekistan) Akobir Turaev |
| Rahmatganj MFS | Second | | | | | |
| Saif Sporting Club | First | (Colombia) Deiner Córdoba | (Kyrgyzstan) Murolimzhon Akhmedov | (Rwanda) Emery Bayisenge | (Sierra Leone) Fayia Kobba Jr. | (Tajikistan) Jahongir Ergashev |
| Saif Sporting Club | Second | | | | | |
| Sheikh Russel KC | First | (Australia) Chris Herd | (Nigeria) Alison Udoka | (Nigeria) Raphael Odovin Onwrebe | (Timor-Leste) Pedro Henrique Oliveira | (Uzbekistan) Alisher Azizov |
| Sheikh Russel KC | Second | | | | | |
| Uttar Baridhara SC | First | (Brazil) Leonardo Vieira Lima | (Ivory Coast) Sangare Issouf | (The Gambia) Landing Darboe | (Nigeria) Simon Ezeodika Obieze | (Uzbekistan) Furqat Hasanboev |
| Uttar Baridhara SC | Second | | | | | |

== League table ==
| Pos | Team | Pld | W | D | L | GF | GA | GD | Pts |
|---|---|---|---|---|---|---|---|---|---|
| 1 | Dhaka Abahani Ltd. | 6 | 4 | 1 | 1 | 12 | 4 | +8 | 13 |
| 2 | Chittagong Abahani Ltd. | 6 | 4 | 1 | 1 | 13 | 7 | +6 | 13 |
| 3 | Lt. Sheikh Jamal DC | 5 | 4 | 0 | 1 | 10 | 5 | +5 | 12 |
| 4 | Dhaka Mohammedan SC Ltd. | 6 | 4 | 0 | 2 | 8 | 7 | +1 | 12 |
| 5 | Saif Sporting Club | 6 | 3 | 2 | 1 | 8 | 5 | +3 | 11 |
| 6 | Bashundhara Kings | 6 | 3 | 1 | 2 | 10 | 9 | +1 | 10 |
| 7 | Rahmatganj MFS | 6 | 2 | 1 | 3 | 6 | 5 | +1 | 7 |
| 8 | Arambagh KS | 5 | 1 | 2 | 2 | 6 | 9 | −3 | 5 |
| 9 | Bangladesh Police FC | 5 | 1 | 2 | 2 | 4 | 7 | −3 | 5 |
| 10 | Sheikh Russel KC | 6 | 1 | 2 | 3 | 4 | 7 | −3 | 5 |
| 11 | Brothers Union | 5 | 0 | 4 | 1 | 6 | 7 | −1 | 4 |
| 12 | Uttar Baridhara SC | 5 | 0 | 1 | 4 | 4 | 11 | −7 | 1 |
| 13 | Muktijoddha Sangsad KC | 5 | 0 | 1 | 4 | 4 | 12 | −8 | 1 |

Source: Soccerway
Rules for classification: 1) Points; 2) Goal difference; 3) Goals scored.

== Results ==
| Home \ Away | AKS | BK | BPFC | BU | CAL | DAL | MSC | SJDC | MUK | RAH | SSC | SRKC | UB |
|---|---|---|---|---|---|---|---|---|---|---|---|---|---|
| Arambagh | — | | | | | | 0–1 | | 2–2 | | 1–1 | | |
| Kings | | — | | | 3–4 | | | | | | | | 1–0 |
| Police | | 1–1 | — | | | | | | | 0–2 | | | 2–1 |
| Brothers | | 2–3 | 1–1 | — | | 1–1 | | | | | | | |
| Ctg Abahani | 1–2 | | | | — | | | | | | | 2–0 | |
| Abahani | | | 2–0 | | 0–2 | — | 4–0 | | 4–1 | 1–0 | | | |
| Mohammedan | | 1–0 | | | | | — | | | | | | |
| Sheikh Jamal | 4–1 | | | | 0–2 | | | — | | | | 2–0 | |
| Muktijoddha | | | | | | | | 1–2 | — | | 0–2 | | |
| Rahmatganj | | 1–2 | | | | | | | | — | | 0–0 | 3–1 |
| Saif | | | | | 2–2 | | 1–0 | 1–2 | | 1–0 | — | | |
| Sheikh Russel | | | | 1–1 | | | 1–2 | | 2–0 | | | — | |
| Baridhara | | | | 1–1 | | | 1–4 | | | | | | — |

Source: Soccerway
Legend: Blue = home team win; Yellow = draw; Red = away team win.

=== Positions by round ===
The following table lists the positions of teams after each week of matches. In order to preserve the chronological evolution, any postponed matches are not included to the round at which they were originally scheduled but added to the full round they were played immediately afterward.

| Team ╲ Round | 1 | 2 | 3 | 4 | 5 | 6 | 7 | 8 | 9 | 10 | 11 | 12 | 13 | 14 | 15 | 16 | 17 | 18 | 19 | 20 | 21 | 22 | 23 | 24 | 25 | 26 |
|---|---|---|---|---|---|---|---|---|---|---|---|---|---|---|---|---|---|---|---|---|---|---|---|---|---|---|
| Arambagh | 9 | 5 | 6 | 8 | 11 | 8 | | | | | | | | | | | | | | | | | | | | |
| Kings | 3 | 3 | 2 | 3 | 4 | 6 | | | | | | | | | | | | | | | | | | | | |
| Police | 12 | 11 | 7 | 7 | 7 | 9 | | | | | | | | | | | | | | | | | | | | |
| Brothers | 6 | 8 | 9 | 9 | 9 | 11 | | | | | | | | | | | | | | | | | | | | |
| Ctg Abahani | 2 | 4 | 5 | 4 | 1 | 2 | | | | | | | | | | | | | | | | | | | | |
| Abahani | 1 | 2 | 1 | 1 | 2 | 1 | | | | | | | | | | | | | | | | | | | | |
| Mohammedan | 4 | 6 | 4 | 6 | 6 | 4 | | | | | | | | | | | | | | | | | | | | |
| Sheikh Jamal | 13 | 7 | 8 | 5 | 5 | 3 | | | | | | | | | | | | | | | | | | | | |
| Muktijoddha | 8 | 12 | 11 | 12 | 13 | 13 | | | | | | | | | | | | | | | | | | | | |
| Rahmatganj | 10 | 10 | 12 | 13 | 10 | 7 | | | | | | | | | | | | | | | | | | | | |
| Saif | 5 | 1 | 3 | 2 | 3 | 5 | | | | | | | | | | | | | | | | | | | | |
| Sheikh Russel | 7 | 9 | 10 | 10 | 8 | 10 | | | | | | | | | | | | | | | | | | | | |
| Baridhara | 11 | 13 | 13 | 11 | 12 | 12 | | | | | | | | | | | | | | | | | | | | |

| Leader |
| Relegation to BCL |

Source: Soccerway

== Statistics ==
=== Goalscorers ===
There have been 95 goals scored in 36 matches, for an average of 2.64 goals per match (as of 15 March 2020).

6 goals

- (Nigeria) Eleta Kingsley (Arambagh KS)

5 goals

- (Nigeria) Sunday Chizoba (Dhaka Abahani)

4 goals

- (Brazil) Nixon Guylherme (Chittagong Abahani)
- (The Gambia) Omar Jobe (Sheikh Jamal Dhanmondi Club)

3 goals

- (Ivory Coast) Ballo Famoussa (Sheikh Jamal Dhanmondi Club)
- (Ivory Coast) Didier Brossou (Chittagong Abahani)
- (The Gambia) Solomon King Konform (Sheikh Jamal Dhanmondi Club)
- (Costa Rica) Daniel Colindres (Bashundhara Kings)
- (Haiti) Kervens Belfort (Dhaka Abahani)
- (Nigeria) Matthew Chinedu (Chittagong Abahani)
- (Nigeria) Ugochukwu Obi Moneke (Dhaka Mohammedan)
- (Rwanda) Emery Bayisenge (Saif SC)
- (Uzbekistan) Otabek Valijonov (Brothers Union)

2 goals

- (Bangladesh) Arif Hossain (Uttar Baridhara SC)
- (Bangladesh) Mohammad Ibrahim (Bashundhara Kings)
- (Bangladesh) Nabib Newaj Jibon (Dhaka Abahani)
- (Bangladesh) Yeasin Arafat (Saif SC)
- (The Gambia) Momodou Bah (Rahmatganj MFS)
- (Kyrgyzstan) Edgar Bernhardt (Dhaka Abahani)
- (Mali) Souleymane Diabate (Dhaka Mohammedan)
- (Nigeria) Kingsley Chigozie (Brothers Union)
- (Nigeria) Raphael Odovin Onwrebe (Sheikh Russel KC)
- (Uzbekistan) Akobir Turaev (Rahmatganj MFS)

1 goal

- (Argentina) Nicolás Delmonte (Bashundhara Kings)
- (Bangladesh) Amir Hakim Bappy (Dhaka Mohammedan)
- (Bangladesh) Arifur Rahman (Saif SC)
- (Bangladesh) Arup Kumar Baidya (Brothers Union)
- (Bangladesh) Didarul Hoque (Arambagh KS)
- (Bangladesh) Foysal Ahmed Fahim (Saif SC)
- (Bangladesh) Jayed Ahmed (Saif SC)
- (Bangladesh) Maruf Ahmed (Uttar Baridhara SC)
- (Bangladesh) Mohammad Sohel Rana (Muktijoddha Sangsad KC)
- (Bangladesh) Nasirul Islam Nasir (Chittagong Abahani)
- (Bangladesh) Sahed Hossain (Dhaka Mohammedan)
- (Bangladesh) Sanowar Hossain (Rahmatganj MFS)
- (Bangladesh) Shakhawat Hossain Rony (Chittagong Abahani)
- SM Bablu (Bangladesh Police FC)
- (Bangladesh) Tawhidul Alam Sabuz (Bashundhara Kings)
- (Bangladesh) Mannaf Rabby (Chittagong Abahani)
- (Brazil) Albert Frank (Muktijoddha Sangsad KC)
- (Bulgaria) Antonio Laskov (Bangladesh Police FC)
- (Cameroon) Paul Emile Biyaga (Muktijoddha Sangsad KC)
- (The Gambia) Landing Darboe (Uttar Baridhara SC)
- (Kyrgyzstan) Bakhtiyar Duyshobekov (Bashundhara Kings)
- (Nigeria) Alison Udoka (Sheikh Russel KC)
- (Puerto Rico) Sidney Rivera (Bangladesh Police FC)
- (Tajikistan) Akhtam Nazarov (Bashundhara Kings)
- (Tajikistan) Siyovush Asrorov (Rahmatganj MFS)
- (Timor-Leste) Pedro Henrique Oliveira (Sheikh Russel KC)

=== Own goals ===
- Nurul Naium Faisal (Bashundhara Kings) vs Bangladesh Police FC
- (Nigeria) Eleta Benjamin Jr. (Arambagh KS) vs Muktijoddha Sangsad KC
- (Bangladesh) Sumon Reza (Uttar Baridhara SC) vs Dhaka Mohammedan

Source: Soccerway

=== Hat-tricks ===
† Bold Club indicates winner of the match

| Player | For | Against | Result | Date | Ref |
|---|---|---|---|---|---|
| Sunday Chizoba ^{4} | Dhaka Abahani | Muktijoddha Sangsad KC | 4–1 | 15 March 2020 | |

^{4} Player scored 4 goals.
