= 2020–21 Bangladesh Championship League =

9th Professional season of Bangladesh Championship League

Bangladesh Championship League
- Season: 2020–21
- Dates: 7 February 2021 - 19 July 2021
- Champions: Swadhinata KS; 1st title
- Promoted: Swadhinata KS
- Relegated: Victoria SC; Dhaka City FC
- Matches: 132
- Goals: 288 (2.18 per match)
- Top goalscorer: Ali Akbar Kanon (13 goals)
- Longest winning run: 6 matches Swadhinata KS
- Longest unbeaten run: 13 matches Fortis FC
- Longest winless run: 22 matches Victoria SC
- Longest losing run: 6 matches Victoria SC

The 2020–21 Bangladesh Championship League was the 9th season of the Bangladesh Championship League since its establishment in 2012. A total of 12 football clubs are competing in the league. T&T Club Motijheel withdrew from the league due to their financial issues. Swadhinata KS clinched their first title, with NoFeL SC following in second.

The league was kicked off on 7 February 2021. It was originally scheduled to be completed within 25 June, but ended on 19 July as the league was postponed few times due to coronavirus pandemic.

== Team ==
=== Team changes ===
The following teams have changed division since the previous season:

=== To BCL ===
Relegated from BPL

- NoFeL SC
- ~~Team BJMC~~ (Note: BJMC not taking part in the competition as they postponed their football activities in 2019 after suffering relegation from the top tier.)

Promoted from Dhaka Senior Division League

- Kawran Bazar Pragati Sangha
- Dhaka Wanderers Club

=== From BCL ===
Promoted to BPL

- Uttar Baridhara SC
- Bangladesh Police FC

Relegated to Dhaka Senior Division League

- Soccer Club Feni

=== Teams locations ===
Team	Location
Agrani Bank Ltd. SC	Dhaka
Dhaka City FC	Dhaka (Khilkhet)
Dhaka WC	Dhaka (Motijheel)
Farashganj SC	Dhaka (Farashganj)
Fakirerpool YMC	Dhaka (Motijheel)
Fortis FC	Dhaka (Badda)
Kawran Bazar PS	Dhaka (Kawran Bazar)
NoFeL Sporting Club	Noakhali
Swadhinata KS	Dhaka (Khilgaon)
Uttara FC	Dhaka (Uttara)
Wari Club	Dhaka (Motijheel)
Victoria SC	Dhaka (Motijheel)

== Venues ==
All matches were held at the BSSS Mostafa Kamal Stadium & Bangabandhu National Stadium in Dhaka, Bangladesh.

Dhaka	Dhaka is located in Bangladesh	Dhaka
Bangabandhu National Stadium	Dhaka is located in Bangladesh	BSSS Mostafa Kamal Stadium
Capacity: 36,000	Dhaka is located in Bangladesh	Capacity: 25,000

== League table ==
Pos	Team	Pld	W	D	L	GF	GA	GD	Pts	BPL
1	Swadhinata KS (C, P)	22	13	6	3	30	11	+19	45	Qualification to 2021–22 BPL
2	NoFeL Sporting Club	22	13	5	4	34	10	+24	44	
3	Fortis FC	22	12	7	3	40	17	+23	43	
4	Kawran Bazar PS	22	12	5	5	32	17	+15	41	
5	Agrani Bank Ltd. SC	22	6	9	7	18	20	−2	27	
6	Dhaka WC	22	7	6	9	22	28	−6	27	
7	Fakirerpool YMC	22	6	8	8	25	21	+4	26	
8	Farashganj SC	22	5	10	7	25	27	−2	25	
9	Uttara FC	22	6	7	9	20	23	−3	25	
10	Wari Club	22	5	10	7	20	24	−4	25	
11	Dhaka City FC (R)	22	4	9	9	14	25	−11	21	Relegation to 2021–22 First Division Football League
12	Victoria SC (R)	22	0	4	18	8	65	−57	4	Relegation to 2021–22 First Division Football League

Source: Sofascore
(C) Champions; (P) Promoted; (R) Relegated

== Results ==
Home \ Away	SKS	KPS	ABL	NSC	FSC	FYMC	WC	FFC	UFC	DWC	DCFC	VSC
Swadhinata KS	—	0–2	0–1	0–0	1–0	4–1	0–0	1–0	2–0	3–0	0–0	3–0
Kawran Bazar PS	1–1	—	0–0	0–1	3–0	2–1	1–0	0–0	3–1	0–0	2–1	5–0
Agrani Bank Ltd. SC	0–0	3–3	—	0–1	1–1	0–0	2–0	1–1	0–1	0–1	0–1	0–0
NoFeL Sporting Club	0–1	2–0	2–0	—	0–0	1–4	0–0	1–2	0–1	1–0	3–0	6–0
Farashganj SC	1–2	0–1	1–2	1–5	—	1–0	1–1	0–0	1–1	0–1	2–0	1–1
Fakirerpool YMC	0–2	0–1	0–0	0–1	1–1	—	4–1	0–1	1–0	0–0	0–0	3–1
Wari Club	0–1	0–1	0–3	0–0	3–3	1–1	—	1–1	3–2	1–1	2–0	1–0
Fortis FC	4–2	2–1	4–0	0–1	0–0	2–1	2–1	—	0–0	3–2	1–1	5–0
Uttara FC	1–1	1–0	0–1	0–2	4–1	0–0	0–2	0–2	—	2–2	1–1	1–0
Dhaka WC	0–1	0–3	3–1	0–3	1–1	0–0	0–0	1–2	1–0	—	2–1	3–1
Dhaka City FC	0–3	1–2	0–2	0–0	0–3	1–1	0–0	1–0	0–0	1–2	—	1–1
Victoria SC	0–2	0–2	1–1	0–4	0–5	0–4	1–3	2–8	0–4	0–2	0–1	—

Source: Sofascore
Legend: Blue = home team win; Yellow = draw; Red = away team win.

== Season statistics ==
=== Goalscorers ===
Rank	Player	Club	Goals
1	Ali Akbar Kanon	Wari Club Dhaka	13
2	Zillur Rahman	Fortis FC	12
3	Kankar Biswas	Fakirerpool YMC	11
4	Emon Hossen	Kawran Bazar PS	10
5	Fuad Hasan	Uttara FC, NoFeL SC	8
5	Jibon Miah	Farashganj SC	8
5	Masud Rana	Uttara FC	8
8	Md Hazanuzzaman	Fortis FC	7
8	Shawkat Hossen	Agrani Bank Ltd. SC	7
10	Naim Uddin	Swadhinata KS	6
10	Abdullah Al Mamun	NoFeL SC	6
10	Jakir Hossain Ziku	Fortis FC	6

=== Hat-tricks ===
Player	For	Against	Result	Date	Ref
Emon Hossen	Kawran Bazar PS	Victoria SC	5–0	10 June 2021	
Ali Akbar Kanon	Wari Club	Victoria SC	3-1	14 June 2021	

=== Own goals ===
† Bold Club indicates winner of the match

Player	Club	Opponent	Result	Date
Tutul	Fakirerpool YMC	Fortis FC	2–1	19 March 2021
Tara	Fortis FC	Swadhinata KS	4-2	15 June 2021

== Cleansheets ==
Rank	Player	Club	Clean sheets
1	Md Raju Chowdhury	Swadhinata KS	15
2	Ashim Kumar Das	NoFeL SC	13
3	Mithun Khalifa	Agrani Bank Ltd. SC	9
4	Mohammad Ali	Farashganj SC	8
4	Uttam Barua	Fortis FC	8
4	Md Robiul Karim	Kawran Bazar PS	8
7	Shimul Kumar Das	Dhaka City FC	7
7	Khandaker Saad Ishtiaque	Fakirerpool YMC	7
9	Jahid Hasan Rabbi	Uttara FC	6
10	Sujon Chowdhury	Wari Club	5
