= 2018–19 Bangladesh Championship League =

Bangladesh Championship League
- Season: 2018-19
- Dates: 10 February – 24 May 2019
- Champions: Bangladesh Police FC
- Promoted: Bangladesh Police FC; Uttar Baridhara SC
- Relegated: Feni SC; Swadhinata Krira Sangha
- Matches played: 110
- Goals scored: 220 (2 per match)
- Top goalscorer: Amirul Islam (17 goals) (Bangladesh Police FC)

The 2018-19 Bangladesh Championship League was the 7th season of the Bangladesh Championship League since its establishment in 2012. A total of 11 teams competed in the league. The season started on 10 February 2019 and ended on 24 May 2019.

== Venue ==
All matches were held at the BSSS Mostafa Kamal Stadium in Dhaka, Bangladesh.

| Dhaka | 2018–19 Bangladesh Championship League is located in Bangladesh |
| BSSS Mostafa Kamal Stadium | 2018–19 Bangladesh Championship League is located in Bangladesh |
| Capacity: 25,000 | 2018–19 Bangladesh Championship League is located in Bangladesh |

== League table ==
| Pos | Team | Pld | W | D | L | GF | GA | GD | Pts | BPL |
|---|---|---|---|---|---|---|---|---|---|---|
| 1 | Bangladesh Police FC | 20 | 11 | 6 | 3 | 31 | 13 | +18 | 39 | Qualification to BPL |
| 2 | Uttar Baridhara SC | 20 | 9 | 6 | 5 | 35 | 20 | +15 | 33 | Qualification to BPL |
| 3 | Farashganj SC | 20 | 7 | 9 | 4 | 17 | 13 | +4 | 30 | |
| 4 | T&T Club Motijheel | 20 | 5 | 11 | 4 | 11 | 9 | +2 | 26 | |
| 5 | Victoria Sporting Club | 20 | 6 | 8 | 6 | 20 | 19 | +1 | 26 | |
| 6 | Agrani Bank Ltd. SC | 20 | 5 | 11 | 4 | 11 | 10 | +1 | 26 | |
| 7 | Fakirerpool YMC | 20 | 6 | 7 | 7 | 22 | 26 | −4 | 25 | |
| 8 | Dhaka City F.C. | 20 | 6 | 7 | 7 | 19 | 27 | −8 | 25 | |
| 9 | Wari Club | 20 | 6 | 5 | 9 | 18 | 25 | −7 | 23 | |
| 10 | Soccer Club Feni | 20 | 5 | 4 | 11 | 16 | 27 | −11 | 19 | Relegation to First Division League |
| 11 | Swadhinata KS | 20 | 3 | 8 | 9 | 20 | 31 | −11 | 17 | Relegation to First Division League |

Source: Scorebing

== Season statistics ==
=== Hat-tricks ===
| Player | For | Against | Result | Date | Ref |
|---|---|---|---|---|---|
| Saif Samshud | Farashganj SC | Swadhinata KS | 4–0 | 18 February 2019 | |
| Zillur | Farashganj SC | Fakirerpool Young Men's Club | 4–1 | 15 March 2019 | |
| Amirul Islam | Bangladesh Police FC | Feni Soccer Club | 3–1 | 28 March 2019 | |
| Sumon Reza | Uttar Baridhara SC | Farashganj SC | 4–0 | 5 May 2019 | |
| Amirul Islam | Bangladesh Police FC | Feni Soccer Club | 5–1 | 24 May 2019 | |
