= Dhaka City FC =

Dhaka City Football Club ঢাকা সিটি ফুটবল ক্লাব
- Full name: Dhaka City Football Club
- Nickname(s): DCFC
- Founded: 2017; 8 years ago
- Owner: Dhaka City Football Club Limited
- Head Coach: Rezaul Haque Jamal
- League: Bangladesh Championship League
- 2020–21: 11th of 12th

Dhaka City Football Club (Bengali: ঢাকা সিটি ফুটবল ক্লাব) is a football team from Dhaka, Bangladesh. The club currently a team of the Bangladesh Championship League.

== History ==
On 10 November 2018, Bangladesh Football Federation gave the green signal to the club to participate in 2018–19 Bangladesh Championship League.

=== 2018–19 season ===
Dhaka City FC had started their campaign with a 1–0 defeat against Farashganj SC.On 20 February 2019, debutantes Dhaka City FC registered their first victory in the Bangladesh Championship League with a 2–0 win over Wari Club. Aurongjeb scored the opening goal in the 60th minute before Sazzad Hossain Munna wrapped up the victory 20 minutes later.

They secured 8th position within 11 teams in the 2018–19 Bangladesh Championship League season. The club will play the Bangladesh Championship League next season as well.

=== 2020–21 season ===
Dhaka City FC secured 11th position within 12 teams in the 2020–21 Bangladesh Championship League season. The club will play the Bangladesh Championship League next season as well.

== Professional league records ==
Season	League	Performance	Note	Ref.
2018–19	BCL	8/11		
2020	BCL	N/A		
2020-21	BCL	11/12		

== Team coaches ==
As of 19 July 2021

On 24 December 2018, the club make history in Bangladesh football by appointing Mirona Khatun as head coach, as she became the first ever female head coach in a male team in Bangladesh The team performance under different under coaches (as of 29 June 2021):

Coach	From	To	P	W	D	L	GS	GA	%W
(Bangladesh) Mirona Khatun	December 2018	March 2019	10	4	3	3	11	9	40.00
(Bangladesh) Rezaul Haque Jamal	April 2019	Present	22	4	9	9	14	25	18.18
