= 2011–12 Federation Cup (Bangladesh) =

2011–12 Bangladesh Federation Cup
Tournament details
- Country: Bangladesh
- Dates: 23 December 2011 –24 January 2012

Final positions
- Champions: Sheikh Jamal DC
- Runners-up: Team BJMC

The 2011–12 Bangladesh Federation Cup was the 24th edition to be played and was won by Sheikh Jamal DC for the first time, defeating Team BJMC 3–1 in the final.

The competition started on 23 December with a qualification stage and finished with the final at the Bangabandhu National Stadium on 24 January.

18 teams took part with a qualification for sides outside the top flight, 6 winners of the one-legged ties would enter the first round being played as a Group Stage, with four groups of four teams. The top two teams from each group qualified for the Quarter Final Stage.

== Group stage ==
=== Group A ===
Pos	Team	Pld	W	D	L	GF	GA	GD	Pts
1	Team BJMC	3	2	1	0	10	2	+8	7
2	Muktijoddha Sangsad	3	2	0	1	15	4	+11	6
3	Cox City Club	3	1	0	2	1	17	−16	3
4	Dhaka Mohammedan	3	0	1	2	1	4	−3	1

Source: Soccerway
Rules for classification: 1) points; 2) goal difference; 3) number of goals scored.

=== Group B ===
Pos	Team	Pld	W	D	L	GF	GA	GD	Pts
1	Dhaka Abahani	3	2	0	1	9	3	+6	6
2	Arambagh KS	3	1	1	1	3	2	+1	4
3	Feni Soccer Club	3	1	1	1	2	2	0	4
4	Bangladesh Police	3	1	0	2	1	8	−7	3

Source: Soccerway
Rules for classification: 1) points; 2) goal difference; 3) number of goals scored.

=== Group C ===
Pos	Team	Pld	W	D	L	GF	GA	GD	Pts
1	Sheikh Russel KC	3	3	0	0	7	1	+6	9
2	Sheikh Jamal DC	3	2	0	1	3	2	+1	6
3	Victoria SC	3	0	1	2	1	4	−3	1
4	Agrani Bank	3	0	1	2	1	5	−4	1

Source: Soccerway
Rules for classification: 1) points; 2) goal difference; 3) number of goals scored.

=== Group D ===
Pos	Team	Pld	W	D	L	GF	GA	GD	Pts
1	Farashganj SC	3	2	1	0	3	0	+3	7
2	Rahmatganj MFS	3	1	2	0	6	3	+3	5
3	Brothers Union	3	0	2	1	3	4	−1	2
4	Wari Club	3	0	1	2	0	5	−5	1

Source: Soccerway
Rules for classification: 1) points; 2) goal difference; 3) number of goals scored.

== Quarter finals ==
Team 1	Score	Team 2
Farashganj SC (Bangladesh)	1–1 (3–5 p)	(Bangladesh) Muktijoddha Sangsad
Team BJMC (Bangladesh)	3–1	(Bangladesh) Rahmatganj MFS
Dhaka Abahani Limited (Bangladesh)	2–2 (3–4 p)	(Bangladesh) Sheikh Jamal Dhanmondi Club
Sheikh Russel KC (Bangladesh)	4–2	(Bangladesh) Arambagh KS

== Semi finals ==
Team 1	Score	Team 2
Team BJMC (Bangladesh)	2–0	(Bangladesh) Muktijoddha Sangsad
Sheikh Jamal (Bangladesh)	2–0	(Bangladesh) Russel KC

== Final ==
Team 1	Score	Team 2
Sheikh Jamal (Bangladesh)	3–1	(Bangladesh) Team BJMC
