= Bangladesh Police FC =

Association football club based in Dhaka

Bangladesh Police
- Full name: Bangladesh Police Football Club
- Nickname: The Policemen
- Short name: BPFC
- Ground: Shaheed Barkat Stadium
- Capacity: 5,000
- Owner: Bangladesh Police
- President: Mosleh Uddin Ahmed
- Head coach: S. M. Asifuzzaman
- League: Bangladesh Football League
- 2025–26: Bangladesh Football League, 4th of 10
Home colours	Away colours

Active departments of Farashganj SC
- Football (Men's): Football (women's)

Bangladesh Police Football Club (previously known as Bangladesh Police Athletic Club) is a professional football club based in Dhaka, Bangladesh. The club was founded by the Bangladesh Police and formerly the East Pakistan Police. They previously played in the First Division Football League in 1998 – then the second-tier league. Police FC became champions of the Second Division in 2013–14. The club gained promotion to the Bangladesh Football League for the first time by becoming champions of the 2018–19 Bangladesh Championship League.

== History ==
=== Early years ===
The club was established during the British Raj in Dhaka as the recreational section of the Dhaka Police under the Indian Imperial Police. Although it was occasionally referred to as Dhaka Police Athletic Club, contemporary sources more commonly identified it simply as Police Athletic Club. The team was initially composed of players employed as constables in the police force, although the club soon began recruiting footballers into the police through a sports quota. In 1942, the Policemen became unbeaten champions of the Dhaka Football League Second Division, winning all six of their matches to finish with the maximum 12 points, two ahead of runners-up Siddeswari Club. Their triumph secured promotion to the First Division. However, the club was relegated back to the Second Division prior to the partition of India.

=== Return to the First Division ===
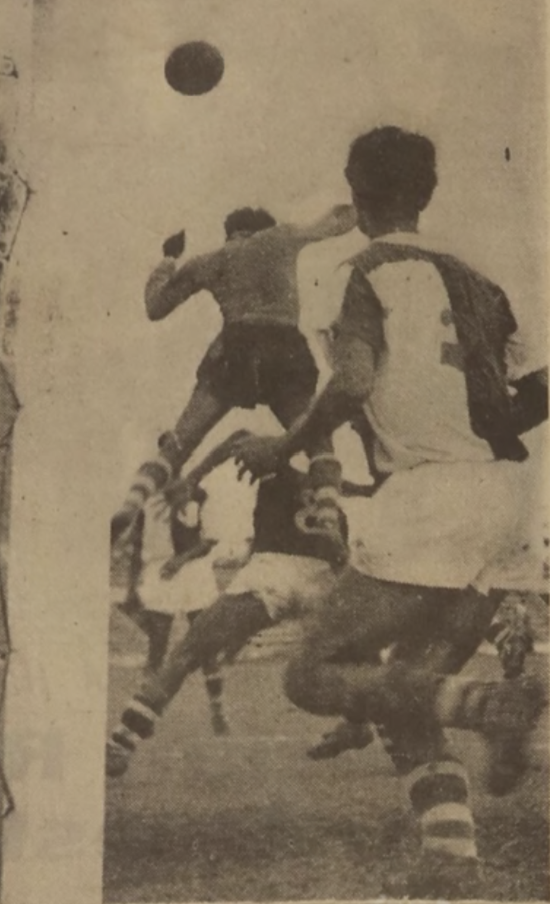
First Division League game between Police and Mohammedan (in black), held on 9 July 1964 at the Dhaka Stadium.

Following Partition, the Dhaka team of the East Pakistan Police continued to compete in the Dhaka Football League. In 1949, the club earned promotion to the First Division after finishing as runners-up to Tejgaon Friends Union in the Second Division. They subsequently established themselves as a consistent mid-table side in the top flight throughout the pre-independence period. On 14 August 1957, Police were crowned joint champions of the Independence Day Football Tournament alongside Dhaka Wanderers Club after the final ended in a 1–1 draw at the Dhaka Stadium. The match was attended by the Chief Minister of East Pakistan, Ataur Rahman Khan. Following the draw, Police won a coin toss, giving them the right to retain the trophy for the first six months.

In 1959, the club strengthened its squad by recruiting Nabi Chowdhury, Zahirul Haque, and Kabir Ahmed from the Pakistan national team. On 14 August, Police once again reached the final of the Independence Day Football Tournament, where they shared the title with Azad Sporting Club after the match ended level. As in 1957, the trophy's initial six-month custody was decided by a toss, which was won by Azad Sporting Club. In the same year, the club also reached the second round of the 1959 Aga Khan Gold Cup, where they were defeated 4–2 by Karachi Port Trust. Between 1959 and 1967, Dhaka Police won the Zakir Hussain Shield, the trophy awarded in the Provincial Police Football Tournament, for seven consecutive years.

=== Stagnation, relegations and professional league ===
After the independence of Bangladesh, control of the club was taken over by the Bangladesh Police. The Policemen were among the fifteen clubs that resumed participation in the Dhaka Football League First Division in 1972. However, after the 1972 season was abandoned midway, the club finished the 1973 season in 12th place. In 1975, they finished as runners-up in the Independence Cup, losing 0–1 to BIDC in the final. The following decade saw the Policemen consistently battle against relegation before they were finally relegated in 1982, bringing an end to the club's 32-year stay in the top flight.

The club made a comeback to the First Division after securing the runners-up position in the Second Division during the 1989–90 season. However, their stay in the top flight was curtailed after experiencing another relegation in the 1992 season. In 1993, following the inception of the Premier Division, Police's Second Division triumph during the 1994 season which concluded in 1995 meant that the club would participate in the 1995 First Division, which began serving as a second-tier. The club spent two years in the First Division before facing relegation once again in 1998.

Since 1999, Police spent 15 years in the Second Division before a new generation, inspired by Amirul Islam, was crowned league champions in the 2013–14 season. The club was directly promoted to the Bangladesh Championship League after meeting the criteria required to enter the professional football league, and the club officially registered to participate on 14 October 2015. During this time, Police also participated in the 2011–12 and 2013 editions of the Federation Cup, without finding much success. The club started going by Bangladesh Police AC, following their promotion to the professional league.

The club entered the Championship League from the 2014–15 season and concluded their inaugural season in the second-tier professional league in 4th place. Police finished mid-table in the subsequent two seasons and barely contended for promotion. On 12 May 2019, following a 1–0 victory over Wari Club, Police secured promotion to the Bangladesh Football League with three games still remaining in the 2018–19 Bangladesh Championship League. On 26 May 2019, Police were officially announced as champions after defeating Feni Soccer Club 5–1 in the season finale. The club's lethal striker, Amirul Islam, scored four goals, including his second hat trick of the season during the match, and finished as the league's top scorer with 17 goals.

=== Bangladesh Football League era ===
Police began the 2019–20 season with the 2019 Federation Cup, where they crashed out after being defeated 3–0 by Bashundhara Kings in the semi-finals. Thus, the Federation Cup campaign of Police FC ended. The club, which throughout its history has mainly consisted of employed police constables, signed four foreign players, including Puerto Rico national team striker Sidney Rivera. On 16 February 2020, Police began their 2019–20 Premier League campaign with a 0–2 defeat to Dhaka Abahani. In its following games four days later, Police salvaged a point with a 1–1 draw with Bashundhara Kings, thanks to an own goal from Kings defender Nurul Naium Faisal. On 24 February 2020, Police secured their first-ever victory in the professional league, defeating Uttar Baridhara 2–1. The club's goals came from Sidney Rivera and Antonio Laskov. Nevertheless, their first season in the professional league only lasted for five matches, as domestic football was canceled due to the COVID-19 pandemic in Bangladesh. The club was also renamed to Bangladesh Police FC soon after their entry to the professional top-tier.

Before the 2020–21 Premier League began, Police replaced their first foreign coach, Nicolas Vitorović, with Sri Lankan Pakir Ali. Police finished 8th in their first full season in the professional league. In October 2021, Police appointed Romanian coach Aristică Cioabă as their third foreign head coach. In their first season under Cioabă, Police finished 8th in the league. After the season, the club's legendary striker Amirul Islam retired. Police began its 2022–23 season with the 2022 Independence Cup and finished fourth after suffering a 4–1 defeat against Dhaka Abahani. The club finished the 2022–23 Premier League in third place, their highest ever in the top flight. Police were also the only club to defeat eventual champions Bashundhara Kings during the league season.

== Ground ==
The Bangladesh Police Football Ground, located in Purbachal, Dhaka, was inaugurated by Inspector General of Police Md. Ali Hossain Fakir on 25 July 2026. Covering nearly 100,000 square feet, the facility serves as the home ground and a dedicated training venue for Bangladesh Police FC.

== Current squad ==
As of 1 September 2026

Note: Flags indicate national team as defined under FIFA eligibility rules; some limited exceptions apply. Players may hold more than one non-FIFA nationality.

No.	Pos.	Nation	Player
1	GK	BAN	Rakibul Hasan Tushar
3	DF	BAN	Md Sagar Mia
7	MF	BAN	M. S. Bablu (captain)
8	MF	UGA	Shafiq Kagimu
9	FW	SEN	Rassoul Ba
10	FW	BAN	Md Rabby Hossen Rahul
12	DF	BAN	Roton Hembrom
14	MF	BAN	Manik Hossain Molla
15	MF	BAN	Shamim Ahmed
17	DF	BAN	Isa Faysal
18	FW	BAN	Moinul Islam Moin
19	FW	CMR	Junior Ngong Sam
20	MF	BAN	Md Akmol Hossan Noyon
22	GK	BAN	Dinaj Hossan Jubed
23	GK	BAN	Md Asif
24	FW	BAN	Dipok Roy
27	DF	BAN	Jahid Hasan

No.	Pos.	Nation	Player
28	FW	BAN	Amirul Islam
29	DF	BAN	Md Siam Omit
32	MF	BAN	Md Sabbir
33	DF	BAN	Akibur Rahman
34	DF	BAN	Md Sharif Uddin Nirob
35	MF	BAN	Steve Supipto Murrmu
36	GK	BAN	Md Shohanur Rahman
55	FW	BAN	Md Al-Amin
73	DF	BAN	Salah Uddin Sahed
77	DF	BAN	Sree Joyonto Kumar Roy
80	FW	BAN	Hossain Ahammad Arian
88	MF	BAN	Arafat Hossain
95	MF	BAN	Sree Sumon Soren
96	MF	BAN	Arman Foysal Akash
97	MF	BAN	Md Sanowar Hossain
98	DF	BRA	Marcelo Júnior
99	FW	BAN	Morshedul Islam

== Current technical staff ==
=== Coaching staff ===
As of November 2026

Role	Name
Head coach	(Bangladesh) S. M. Asifuzzaman
Goalkeeping coach	(Bangladesh) Nizam Mozumdar
Team manager	(Bangladesh) Mollik Ahsan Uddin Sami
Physiotherapist	(Bangladesh) Md Azad Sharif Sujon

=== Board of directors ===
As of September 2026

Role	Name
President	(Bangladesh) Mosleh Uddin Ahmed
Vice-president	(Bangladesh) Faruk Ahmed
General secretary	(Bangladesh) Shamima Parvin

== Head coach's record ==
As of 11 August 2026

Head Coach	Nat.	From	To	P	W	D	L	GS	GA	%W
S. M. Asifuzzaman	(Bangladesh)	February 2019	May 2019	20	11	6	3	31	13	55.00
Nicolas Vitorović	(Cyprus)	4 August 2019	31 August 2020	9	3	2	4	10	16	33.33
Pakir Ali	(Sri Lanka)	October 2020	August 2021	26	6	8	12	28	42	23.08
Aristică Cioabă	(Romania)	October 2021	31 May 2024	79	32	22	25	120	102	40.51
Mahabubul Haque Jowel	(Bangladesh)	August 2024	30 June 2025	22	9	5	8	28	29	40.91
S. M. Asifuzzaman	(Bangladesh)	20 July 2025	Present	23	8	9	6	25	24	34.78

P – Total of played matches W – Won matches D – Drawn matches L – Lost matches GS – Goal scored GA – Goals against
%W – Percentage of matches won

== Season by season record ==
Record as Professional Football League member
Season	Division	League								Federation Cup	Independence Cup	Asian club competition		Top league scorer(s)	
Season	Division	P	W	D	L	GF	GA	Pts	Position	Federation Cup	Independence Cup	Asian club competition		Player	Goals
2015/16	BCL	14	3	8	3	13	11	17	4th	—	—	—		(Bangladesh) Amirul Islam	4
2016	BCL	14	4	6	4	11	9	18	4th	—	—	—		(Bangladesh) Amirul Islam (Bangladesh) Komol Barua	4
2017	BCL	18	5	7	6	12	12	22	7th	—	—	—			
2018/19	BCL	20	11	6	3	31	13	39	Champions	—	—	—		(Bangladesh) Amirul Islam	17
2019/20	BFL	Abandoned								Semi-finals	—	—		3 players	1
2020/21	BFL	24	6	7	11	26	39	25	9th	Group-stage	—	—		(Ivory Coast) Christian Kouakou	7
2021/22	BFL	22	8	6	8	28	32	30	8th	Group-stage	Semi-finals	—		(Afghanistan) Amredin Sharifi	9
2022/23	BFL	20	10	5	5	39	21	35	3rd	Group-stage	Third-place	—		(Venezuela) Edward Morillo	9
2023/24	BFL	18	7	5	6	23	19	26	4th	Semi-final	Quarter-final	—		(Colombia) Edis Ibargüen (Venezuela) Edward Morillo	5
2024/25	BFL	18	8	3	7	23	24	27	7th	Group-stage	Not held	—		(Bangladesh) Al-Amin	10
2025/26	BFL	18	6	9	3	19	15	27	4th	Group-stage	Not held	—		(Brazil) Paulo Henrique	6
2026/27	BFL										Not held	AFC Challenge League	Preliminary stage		

P – Total of played matches W – Won matches D – Drawn matches L – Lost matches GF – Goals for the team GA – Goals against
Pts- Points

== Performance in AFC competitions ==
- AFC Challenge League

2026–27: Preliminary stage

Season	Competition	Round	Club	Home	Away	Aggregate
2026–27	AFC Challenge League	Preliminary stage	(Syria) Al Ittihad Ahli		0–1	

== Honours ==
- Bangladesh Championship League
  - Champions (1): 2018–19
- Dhaka Second Division League
  - Champions (3): 1994, 2013
  - Runners-up (2): 1949, 1989–90
- Independence Cup
  - Runners-up (1): 1975
- Independence Day Tournament
  - Champions (2): 1959, 1957

== Shirt sponsors ==
Period	Shirt sponsor
2015–16	Popular Life Insurance Limited
2017–18	Runner Group
2018–19	Nirman
2019–present	Nasir Group

== Controversy ==
On 24 May 2019, Police constable Mohammad Shamim assaulted BFF's competition manager Zaber Bin Ansari after being denied entry into the ground during a match against Feni Soccer Club. The Police, having already secured the 2018–19 Bangladesh Championship League title before the game, would eventually be presented with the trophy after the match's conclusion.

Subsequently, four more players—Amirul Islam, Tarek Aziz, Azmi Omar, and Sarwar Hossain—joined Shamim in the assault right after the completion of the prize-giving ceremony at the Bangabandhu National Stadium. In response to their involvement, all four police players were fined Tk 1 lakh each. Amirul and Aziz received two-match suspensions, while Omar and Sarwar were handed nine-match bans each. The team's physiotherapist, Santanu Mallik, also received a nine-match ban and a Tk 2 lakh fine. As for Shamim, he was handed a lifetime stadium ban across the country as part of the disciplinary actions.

== Notable players ==
- The players below had senior international cap(s) for their respective countries. Players whose names are listed represented their countries before or after playing for Bangladesh Police FC.

Africa

- (Uganda) Shafiq Kagimu (2025–present)

Asia

- (Pakistan) Nabi Chowdhury (1959–68)
- (Pakistan) Zahirul Haque (1959)
- (Pakistan) Kabir Ahmed (1959)
- (Afghanistan) Amredin Sharifi (2021–22)
- (Kyrgyzstan) Mustafa Yusupov (2023–24)
- (Uzbekistan) Javokhir Sokhibov (2024)
- (Bhutan) Orgyen Tshering (2025–26)
- (Nepal) Kiran Chemjong (2025–26)
- (Nepal) Ayush Ghalan (2025–present)

North America

- (Puerto Rico) Sidney Rivera (2019–20)
