= Amirul Islam (footballer) =

Bangladeshi footballer

Personal information
- Full name: Mohammed Amirul Islam
- Date of birth: 1 February 1988 (age 38)
- Place of birth: Habiganj, Bangladesh
- Height: 1.80 m (5 ft 11 in)
- Position: Striker

Team information
- Current team: Bangladesh Police
- Number: 28

Senior career*
Years	Team	Apps	(Gls)
2007–2022	Bangladesh Police		
2017–2018	→ Muktijoddha (loan)	7	(0)
2025–	Bangladesh Police	14	(1)
- * Club domestic league appearances and goals as of 24 October 2026

Amirul Islam (Bengali: আমিরুল ইসলাম; born 1 February 1988) is a Bangladeshi professional footballer who plays as a striker for Bangladesh Football League club Bangladesh Police.

== Career ==
Amirul began his career playing divisional football in Sylhet before taking up a job with the Bangladesh Police in 2006. After his impressive performances during inter-service football tournaments, he secured a place in the Bangladesh Police, which was at the time participating in the Dhaka Second Division League.

Amirul was instrumental for the Policemen during their domestic cup exploits and helped them qualify for the main stages of the 2011–12 Federation Cup by scoring a brace during their qualifying match against Chittagong Abahani, on 24 December 2011. In the 2013 Federation Cup he scored against top-flight outfit Team BJMC during a 2–2 draw. During this time, he attracted interest from numerous top-flight clubs; however, due to his job at Bangladesh Police, he remained playing in the Second Division and inter-service tournaments with its football club.

In 2014, he scored 14 goals to secure Police the Second Division title along with direct promotion to the second-tier, the Bangladesh Championship League. Amirul struck four goals in his first professional league season, with his first coming against Victoria SC in a 1–1 draw, on 3 December 2015. The following season, he found the net three times. In November 2017, after the conclusion of the 2017 Bangladesh Championship League he was permitted by Police officials to join Bangladesh Premier League club Muktijoddha Sangsad KC on a short-term loan, all while still retaining his job in the police force. On 20 November 2017, he made his Premier League debut as Muktijoddha tied 1–1 with Rahmatganj MFS.

With experience playing top-flight football, Amirul returned to Police for the 2018–19 Bangladesh Championship League, and helped his club secure promotion to the Premier League with his league highest 17 goals. He scored two hat-tricks during the season, the first came on 28 March 2019, as Police thrashed Feni SC 3–1. His third hat-trick came during the season ending match against the same opponents, scoring four as Police won 5–1 to lift their maiden Championship League title. However, Amirul along with four other Police players were handed a Tk 1 lakh fine for being involved in the assault of BFF's competition manager Zaber Bin Ansari and other security personnel, during the league's prize giving ceremony.

Amirul's first Premier League game for Police came against Abahani Limited Dhaka in a 0–2 defeat on 16 February 2020. However, he only managed to make 14 appearances for the club while playing in the top-tier. On 21 July 2022, he announced his retirement after Police were beaten 1–4 by Sheikh Russel KC at the Bashundhara Kings Arena. He came on as a 71st-minute substitute during the league fixture, and following its conclusion, a retirement ceremony was held at the stadium by officials from both clubs. Following his retirement ceremony, Amirul stated, "Maybe I didn't get everything as I wanted. Something is lacking. But I am satisfied with my career. In fact, everything has an end." He also expressed regret about not getting a national team call-up during his career, further stating, "I had a dream to play in the national team, but that didn't happen. So, I want the young footballers to weave their dreams and do something good in the future."

Amirul came out of retirement in the 2025–26 season rejoining Bangladesh Police.

== Honours ==
Bangladesh Police

- Dhaka Second Division League: 2013–14
- Bangladesh Championship League: 2018–19

Individual

- 2013–14 – Dhaka Second Division League top scorer
- 2018–19 – Bangladesh Championship League top scorer
