= Mohammed Al-Amin =

Bangladeshi footballer (born 2004)

Al-Amin
Personal information
- Full name: Mohammed Al-Amin
- Date of birth: 29 March 2004 (age 22)
- Place of birth: Nilphamari, Bangladesh
- Height: 1.67 m (5 ft 6 in)
- Positions: Striker; winger

Team information
- Current team: Dhaka Abahani
- Number: 55

Youth career
- 2018–2020: Shamsul Huda FA

Senior career*
Years	Team	Apps	(Gls)
2020–2021	Arambagh KS	16	(0)
2023–2024	Sheikh Jamal DC	12	(0)
2024–2025	Bangladesh Police	18	(10)
2025–	Dhaka Abahani	10	(2)

International career^{‡}
2018	Bangladesh U16	3	(0)
2025–	Bangladesh U23	5	(1)
2026–	Bangladesh Olympic	3	(0)
2025–	Bangladesh	2	(0)
Medal record
Representing Bangladesh
SAFF U-17 Championship
Winner	2018 Nepal	Team
- * Club domestic league appearances and goals as of 22 April 2026 ‡ National team caps and goals as of 8 June 2026

Mohammed Al-Amin (Bengali: মোহাম্মদ আল-আমিন; born 29 March 2004), often known as simply Al-Amin, is a Bangladeshi professional footballer who plays as a forward for Bangladesh Premier League club Dhaka Abahani.

== Early career ==
A product of Shamsul Huda Football Academy of Jessore, Al-Amin, playing as a right- back, participated in the Clear Men Under-17 School Football Tournament in 2019 and was selected among the best six players of the tournament, gaining the opportunity to train with the English club Manchester City. However, this opportunity did not come to fruition due to the COVID-19 pandemic.

== Club career ==
=== Arambagh KS ===
In August 2021, Al-Amin was one of the 13 footballers from Arambagh KS banned by BFF initially for three years due to match-fixing. The ban was later reduced to one year by FIFA.

=== Sheikh Jamal DC ===
During his year-long ban, Al-Amin returned to Shamsul Huda Football Academy and continued his training and would eventually join Sheikh Jamal DC in October 2023. At the Dhanmondi-based club, coach, Zulfiker Mahmud Mintu, deployed him as a right-winger, and he went on to make 12 league appearances.

=== Bangladesh Police ===
On 29 November 2024, Al-Amin made his debut for Bangladesh Police FC in their opening 2024–25 Premier League match against Brothers Union. On 7 December, he scored his first professional goal, coming in a brace against Fakirerpool YMC in a 4–1 victory. In the following league match on 14 December, Al-Amin, playing as a center-forward, scored another brace in a 4–0 victory over Dhaka Wanderers.

== International career ==
Al-Amin was a member of the Bangladesh U15 team which clinched the 2018 SAFF U-15 Championship, making his only appearance as a substitute in a match against hosts, Nepal U15. Later that year, he played in the UEFA Assist U-16 Development Tournament held in Thailand, playing against Cyprus and Maldives.

On 4 June 2025, Al-Amin made his Bangladesh national team debut as a 60th-minute substitute in a 2–0 victory over Bhutan.

== Career statistics ==
=== Club ===
As of 27 May 2025.

Appearances and goals by club, season and competition
Club	Season	League			Domestic Cup		Other		Continental		Total	
Club	Season	Division	Apps	Goals	Apps	Goals	Apps	Goals	Apps	Goals	Apps	Goals
Arambagh KS	2020–21	Bangladesh Premier League	16	0	2	0	—		—		18	0
Sheikh Jamal DC	2023–24	Bangladesh Premier League	12	0	1	0	0	0	—		13	0
Bangladesh Police	2024–25	Bangladesh Premier League	18	10	3	2	—		—		21	12
Career total			46	10	6	2	0	0	0	0	52	12

=== International ===
As of 10 June 2025.

Appearances and goals by national team and year
National team	Year	Apps	Goals
Bangladesh	2025	2	0
Total		2	0

=== International goals ===
==== Youth ====
Scores and results list Bangladesh's goal tally first.

No.	Date	Venue	Opponent	Score	Result	Competition
1.	9 September 2025	Việt Trì Stadium, Phú Thọ, Vietnam	Singapore	2–0	4–1	AFC U-23 Asian Cup qualification

== Honours ==
Bangladesh U-15

- SAFF U-17 Championship: 2018
