= Sidney Rivera =

American soccer player

Personal information
- Full name: Sidney Adam Rivera
- Date of birth: November 15, 1993 (age 32)
- Place of birth: Staten Island, New York, United States
- Height: 1.88 m (6 ft 2 in)
- Position: Forward

Team information
- Current team: New York Braveheart

Youth career
- 2009–2011: Match Fit Academy

College career
Years	Team	Apps	(Gls)
2011–2014	Old Dominion Monarchs	48	(11)

Senior career*
Years	Team	Apps	(Gls)
2014	Virginia Beach City		
2015	Orlando City	0	(0)
2015	→ Louisville City (loan)	10	(1)
2015	→ Pittsburgh Riverhounds (loan)	1	(0)
2016–2017	Puerto Rico	36	(5)
2018	Atlantic City	7	(6)
2018	Reno 1868	0	(0)
2019	Than Quảng Ninh	2	(0)
2019	FC Motown	5	(2)
2019	Philadelphia Fury	1	(0)
2019–2020	Bangladesh Police	9	(5)
2021	Morris Elite SC	5	(2)
2022–	New York Braveheart		

International career^{‡}
2019–2021	Puerto Rico	10	(3)
- * Club domestic league appearances and goals as of October 25, 2023 ‡ National team caps and goals as of October 25, 2023

Sidney Adam Rivera (born November 15, 1993) is a professional soccer player who plays for United Premier Soccer League side New York Braveheart SC. Born in the United States, he represents Puerto Rico internationally.

Born and raised in Staten Island, New York, Rivera moved to Hampton, New Jersey and played high school soccer at Saint Benedict's Preparatory School and North Hunterdon High School.

== Club career ==
=== College ===
Rivera spent his entire college career at Old Dominion University. He made a total of 48 appearances for the Monarchs and tallied 11 goals and one assist. He led the team with nine goals in 2014, where he won the first ever Conference-USA tournament championship in Old Dominion University history while being named tournament offensive MVP. Rivera played for Virginia Beach City FC in the summer of 2014.

=== Professional ===
On January 20, 2015, Rivera was selected in the third round (63rd overall) of the 2015 MLS SuperDraft by Orlando City. While he earned a contract with Orlando, the team loaned him out on May 8 to USL affiliate club Louisville City FC. He made his professional debut four days later in a 3–0 victory over the Wilmington Hammerheads. Rivera went on to make 10 appearances for Louisville before leaving the team under circumstances that neither Louisville, nor Orlando would comment on. On July 30, he was sent on loan to the Pittsburgh Riverhounds along with teammate, Conor Donovan, in a bid to gain more experience. However, Rivera would only make 1 appearance for the Riverhounds and he was released by Orlando on November 25, 2015.

On April 6, 2016, Rivera signed with NASL expansion side Puerto Rico FC. In his first season with the club, Rivera found consistent playing time for the first time in his professional career, making 16 appearances and scoring 3 goals. After a successful first season with the club, Rivera appeared in 20 matches for Puerto Rico FC, however, he only started 6 matches and his minutes over the course of the season decreased. Due to the hiatus by both the NASL, due to operations reasons, and the team, because of the devastation caused by Hurricane Maria, Rivera left the club at the end of the 2017 season.

After leaving Puerto Rico, Rivera had a brief stint in the semi-professional National Premier Soccer League, making 7 appearances for Atlantic City FC. Then he had a brief stint with USL Championship side, Reno 1868, where he failed to make an appearance for the club. After leaving Reno, Rivera moved to V.League 1 side Than Quang Ninh. However, despite playing and starting in the first two matches for the club, Rivera was dropped from the squad for undisclosed reasons. After leaving Vietnam, Rivera returned to New Jersey where he began playing for FC Motown in the National Premier Soccer League.

After the NPSL season, Rivera signed with the Philadelphia Fury of the National Independent Soccer Association, along with several of his FC Motown teammates, ahead of the league's inaugural season.

=== Post-professional ===
On April 26, 2021, Rivera signed with USL League Two side Morris Elite SC to compete in the clubs inaugural season. On May 24, 2021, he scored the first goal for the club in a 1–0 victory over F.A. Euro, the first victory in club history.

Rivera joined New York Braveheart SC of the United Premier Soccer League in 2022.

== International career ==
Rivera was born in the United States to a Colombian father and Cape Verdean mother. After a stint with Puerto Rico FC, he gained the option to represent the Puerto Rico national football team. He made his debut for Puerto Rico on March 24, 2019, in a CONCACAF Nations League qualifier against Grenada, as a 58th-minute substitute for Héctor Ramos.

=== International goals ===
Scores and results Puerto Rico's goal tally first.

No.	Date	Venue	Opponent	Score	Result	Competition
1.	November 19, 2019	Juan Ramón Loubriel Stadium, Bayamón, Puerto Rico	Anguilla	1–0	3–0	2019–20 CONCACAF Nations League C
2.	November 19, 2019	Juan Ramón Loubriel Stadium, Bayamón, Puerto Rico	Anguilla	2–0	3–0	2019–20 CONCACAF Nations League C
