= Shafiq Kagimu =

Ugandan footballer (born 1998)

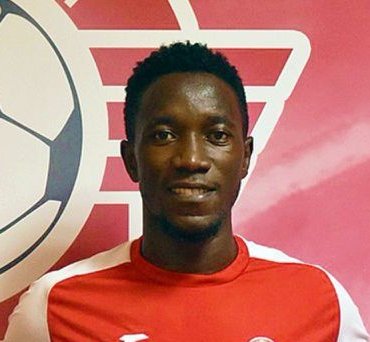
- Kagimu in 2023

Personal information
- Full name: Shafiq Kuchi Kagimu
- Date of birth: 28 November 1998 (age 27)
- Place of birth: Nsambya, Uganda
- Position: Midfielder

Team information
- Current team: Bangladesh Police
- Number: 8

Youth career
- 2003–2012: Zebra FC
- 2012–2013: Kampala Junior Team
- 2013–2015: Water FC

Senior career*
Years	Team	Apps	(Gls)
2015–2023	Uganda Revenue Authority		
2023	Gor Mahia		
2023–2025	FK Rabotnički	33	(1)
2025	→ AP Brera Strumica (loan)	14	(1)
2025–	Bangladesh Police	22	(5)

International career^{‡}
- Uganda U20
- Uganda U23
2017–	Uganda	18	(0)
- * Club domestic league appearances and goals as of 24 October 2026 ‡ National team caps and goals as of 11:29, 19 September 2023 (UTC)

Shafiq Kuchi Kagimu (born 28 November 1998) is a Ugandan professional footballer who plays as a midfielder for Bangladesh Football League club Bangladesh Police and the Uganda national team.

== Club career ==
Born in Nsambya, he played youth football for Zebra FC, Kampala Junior Team and Water FC. He began his senior career with Uganda Revenue Authority in 2015. At the end of the 2016–17 season he was nominated for the 'Best Midfielder' award at the UPL Awards. In April 2019 he said that he was being played in more attacking roles, resulting in better form and more goals.

After playing in Kenya for Gor Mahia, he signed for Macedonian club FK Rabotnički in August 2023.

In August 2025, he transferred to Bangladesh Football League club Bangladesh Police FC.

== International career ==
Kagimu played for Uganda U20 during the COSAFA U-20 Tournament which was held in Zambia in 2017. He made his debut on 6 December 2017 against Zambia U20 at Arthur Davies Stadium.

Kagimu has played for Uganda U23 during the TOTAL AFCON U-23 Qualifiers. He made his debut on 14 November 2018 against South Sudan U23 at Star Times Stadium in a 1–0 victory.

He made his senior international debut for Uganda in 2017.

== Personal life ==
He is nicknamed "Kuchi". He studied for a degree in Procurement and Logistics management at Kampala University.
