= Paulo Henrique (footballer, born 1991) =

Brazilian footballer

Personal information
- Full name: Paulo Henrique Santos de Azevedo
- Date of birth: 30 March 1991 (age 35)
- Place of birth: Rio de Janeiro, Brazil
- Height: 1.86 m (6 ft 1 in)
- Position: Forward

Team information
- Current team: Forca Kochi FC
- Number: 9

Youth career
- 2010: Boavista

Senior career*
Years	Team	Apps	(Gls)
2010	CRAC	3	(0)
2011	Barra do Garças	12	(4)
2011–2012	Mixto	21	(8)
2012–2013	CEOV	10	(3)
2013–2014	Boavista		
2014	Iporá	8	(0)
2015	União Barbarense	5	(0)
2015–2016	Caldas Novas	23	(5)
2016–2017	Iporá	13	(2)
2017–2018	Santos-AP		
2018	Inter de Santa Maria	11	(6)
2019	São Paulo	17	(8)
2019	Arapongas	6	(1)
2019–2020	Guarany de Bagé	5	(0)
2020	Santa Lucia	4	(1)
2020–2021	Marsa	14	(2)
2021	→ Victoria Hotspurs (loan)		
2021–2022	Persiraja Banda Aceh	12	(6)
2022–2023	Masfout		
2023	Al Rams		
2023	Isidro Metapán	10	(5)
2023–2024	Persebaya Surabaya	15	(4)
2024–2025	Persikota Tangerang	17	(10)
2025	Always Ready		
2025	ABB	9	(0)
2025–2026	Bangladesh Police	14	(7)
- * Club domestic league appearances and goals as of September 2026

Paulo Henrique Santos de Azevedo (born 30 March 1991) is a Brazilian professional footballer who plays as a forward.

== Club career ==
=== Malta ===
On 31 January 2020, it was announced that Santa Lucia had signed Henrique on a one-year contract. He played for this club only 5 months by making 4 appearances and scored 1 goal, then on 11 July 2020, he signed a contract with Maltese Challenge League club Marsa, with his club, he made 15 appearances and scored 3 goals. On 1 February 2021, Henrique joined GFL First Division club Victoria Hotspurs on loan from Marsa.

=== Indonesia ===
On 15 June 2021, he made his first career by arriving in Indonesia after a one year career in Malta, then on 1 July he signed a one-year contract with Indonesian Liga 1 club Persiraja Banda Aceh. He made his professional debut for the club, in a 2–1 loss against Bhayangkara on 29 August 2021. He also scored his first goal for Persiraja, where he scored with a header in the 32nd minutes.
