= Nicolas Vitorović =

Cypriot association football player and manager

Nikola Vitorović
Personal information
- Full name: Nikola Vitorović
- Date of birth: May 13, 1990 (age 36)
- Place of birth: Limassol, Cyprus
- Height: 1.75 m (5 ft 9 in)
- Positions: Centre forward; attacking midfielder

Team information
- Current team: FK Riteriai (Head Coach)

Youth career
- AEL Limassol
- Blackburn Rovers

Senior career*
Years	Team	Apps	(Gls)
2004–2008	AEL B	110	(114)
2007–2008	AEL Limassol	17	(6)
2008–2009	→ Chalkanoras Idaliou (loan)	11	(1)
2009–2010	→ E.N. Pareklissias (loan)	28	(9)
2010–2014	E.N. Pareklissias	60	(16)
2014	FK Nevėžis	15	(6)
2015	Metalul Reșița	14	(2)
2015–2016	Xagħra United	18	(7)
2016–2017	Brothers Union	17	(3)

International career
2007	Serbia U17	2	(1)
2008	Cyprus U19	10	(5)

Managerial career
- 2014: FK Feniksas (Youth Coach)
- 2016: Metalul Reșița (assistant coach)
- 2016–2017: Xagħra United (U18 & Youth Director)
- 2017–2018: Brothers Union (Head Coach/Player)
- 2018-2019: Brothers Union (Technical Director)
- 2019–2020: Bangladesh Police FC (Head Coach)
- 2021–2022: POX Xylotympou (Opponent Analyst)
- 2022–2023: Alki Oroklini (Assistant Manager)
- 2023–2024: Bavarians FC (Head Coach)
- 2024: SK Super Nova (Head Coach)
- 2025–: FK Riteriai (Head Coach)
- * Club domestic league appearances and goals as of 14 February 2025

Nikola "Nicolas" Vitorović (born 13 May 1990 in Limassol) is a Cypriot former footballer who is the current manager of FK Riteriai and possesses the UEFA PRO Licence.

At 27 years of age, he made the books of History of Bangladesh Football becoming the youngest Head Coach to take over a Premier League club with Brothers Union. After having stints in Bangladesh and Cyprus in several positions Head coach of Bavarians FC in Mongolian Premier League 2023–2024, Latvian 1 lyga Champions Super Nova

== Career ==
He started his football career with AEL Limassol where excellent youth potential brought him to make a short term move to English Premier League Club Blackburn Rovers F.C. but shortly returned to Cyprus and in 2006 was promoted to the Cypriot First Division team AEL Limassol. He played several games for the senior team in the 2007/2008 season and had appearances for the youth team, which led him to being honored with the prize of Best young player in Cyprus.

In 2008-09 he was given on loan to Chalkanoras Idaliou from the Cypriot Second Division, who played during his 8 months loan spell, 11 games and scoring 1 goal.

After his return in June 2009 was loaned for the 2009/2010 to another team this time Enosis Neon Parekklisia F.C.where he had 28 appearances and scored 9 goals. In 2010-11 he joined on permanently basis to Enosis Neon Parekklisia F.C. of the Cypriot Second Division on a free transfer, where he had 7 appearances and scored one goal. 2011-2012 played 24 games scoring 3 goals and having assisted 7 times. In 2012-2013 E.N. Pareklissias, In July 2014 he joined FK Nevėžis in A Lyga for the second half of the season. In first 6 games he scored 4 goals and then onwards gave 5 more assists in his 15 match appearance for the club till the end of his contract on 1 November 2014, while in FK Nevėžis he recorded 3 appearances in European Competitions. After a successful half season in Lithuania a transfer to S. League Hougang United was the next move for the player making 5 appearances after the half season he left the club. End of January Romanian side Metalul Reșița who plays in Liga II who was in need of players signed Nikola Vitorovic till June where the player is now Captain and also Assistant Coach of Mr. Carol Gurgu.

August 2016 signed as player for Premier League club in Gozo Football League First Division club Xagħra United F.C. and also as Head Coach of Xagħra United F.C. U18 and also Director of Youth having made a record of 5 assists in the Maltese FA Trophy game Xagħra United F.C. vs Mtarfa F.C. 7–0.

August 2017 Nikola Vitorovic took another path in his career and took over as Head coach / Player position of Brothers Union Limited in Bangladesh Premier League and made an impact after saving the team which was last when he took over. The team finished in great 7th position with 22 points from those 2 points in 4 games before Vitorovic came. In 2018–2019 season he was announced at the mid end of season as Technical Director of the club with target to save the team again. After a successful mission in 2 seasons with Brothers Union, his current team Bangladesh Police FC offered him a 1+1 year contract. In his stint there till up to date, he has taken the team to the final of DFA Challenge Cup and also the Semi-Final of the Federations Cup losing to the winner Bashundhara Kings. After his stint in Bangladesh he returned to Cyprus as opponent analyst in Pox Xylotympou and assistant coach in Alki Oroklinis.the 2023–2024 season he is head coach of Bavarians Fc in Mongolian Premier League, later on got to coach Super Nova in 1 Lyga Latvia and currently in 2025 season head coach of FK Riteriai.

In 2024 season was head coach in Latvian SK Super Nova and became champions of the Latvian First League.

On 14 February 2025 signed with Lithuanian Riteriai Club.

== Managerial Statistics ==
As of 16 March 2025

Team	From	To	P	W	D	L	GS	GA	%W
Brothers Union (player-coach)	19 August 2017	8 October 2017	6	1	1	4	5	13	16.67
Brothers Union	9 October 2017	31 March 2018	12	4	4	4	14	14	33.33
Bangladesh Police	1 September 2019	20 September 2020	9	3	2	4	10	16	33.33
Super Nova	20 December 2023	31 January 2025	3	1	1	1	10	4	33.33
Riteriai	14 February 2025	Present	3	0	2	1	6	7	0.00

P – Total of played matches W – Won matches D – Drawn matches L – Lost matches GS – Goal scored GA – Goals against
%W – Percentage of matches won

== Honours ==
Coaching License Uefa A 2018

Coaching Licence Uefa B Serbia 2014

Best Cypriot Young Talented Player 2007-2008

A. Division Cup Runner-up 1x 2008/2009 AEL Limassol

D. Division League Champion 1x 2009-2010 Enosis Neon Parekklisia F.C.

Cypriot Third Division Runner-up 1x 2010/2011 Enosis Neon Parekklisia F.C.
