= Orgyen Tshering =

Bhutanese footballer

Personal information
- Full name: Orgyen Wangchuk Tshering
- Date of birth: 14 September 1999 (age 27)
- Place of birth: Thimphu, Bhutan
- Height: 1.78 m (5 ft 10 in)
- Position: Attacking midfielder

Team information
- Current team: Thimphu City
- Number: 10

Youth career
- 2014–2016: Thimphu City

Senior career*
Years	Team	Apps	(Gls)
2017–2025	Thimphu City	114	(37)
2025–2026	Bangladesh Police	11	(0)
2026–	Thimphu City	5	(2)

International career^{‡}
2017–	Bhutan	5	(0)
- * Club domestic league appearances and goals as of 21 April 2026 ‡ National team caps and goals as of 14:40, 20 April 2018 (UTC)

Orgyen Wangchuk Tshering (born 14 September 1999) is a Bhutanese professional footballer who plays as an attacking midfielder for Bhutan Premier League club Thimphu City. He is the most capped player for the club.

== International career ==
Tshering made his international debut in a 2–0 home loss to the Maldives in the third round of 2019 Asian Cup qualification.

== Career statistics ==
=== International ===
As of matches played 20 April 2018

National team	Year	Apps	Goals
Bhutan U18	2017	4	2
Bhutan	2017	3	0
Bhutan	2018	2	0

=== Club ===
National team	Year	Apps	Goals	Assists
Thimphu City	2016–present	114	37	45
