= 2025–26 Arambagh KS season =

Arambagh KS 2025–26 football season

Arambagh KS
2025–26 season
- General Secretary: Md Yaqub Ali
- Head coach: Md Akbar Hossain Ridon
- Football League: 9th of 10 (Relegated)
- Federation Cup: Group stage
- Top goalscorer: League: (Ghana) Kwame Kizito (5 goals); All: (Ghana) Kwame Kizito (5 goals)
- Biggest win: 2–0 Vs Brothers Union (Home); Football League (12 December 2025)
- Biggest defeat: 0–5 Vs Bashundhara Kings (Neutral); Federation Cup (7 April 2026); 0–4 Vs Fortis FC (Neutral); Federation Cup (16 December 2025)

The 2025–26 season was Arambagh KS's 67th season since its establishment in 1958 and its 1st season in the Bangladesh Football League. In addition to domestic league, Arambagh KS participated in this season's edition of Federation Cup. The season covered period is 1 June 2025 to 23 May 2026.

== Current squad ==
As of 5 September 2025

Note: Flags indicate national team as defined under FIFA eligibility rules; some limited exceptions apply. Players may hold more than one non-FIFA nationality.

No.	Pos.	Nation	Player
1	GK	BAN	Azad Hossen
2	DF	BAN	Kazi Rahad Mia
3	DF	BAN	Md Rokey
4	DF	BAN	Nikson Chakma (Captain)
5	DF	BAN	Mohammed Obaidullah
6	DF	GHA	Ben Quansah
7	FW	NGR	Yaya John Denapo
8	MF	GHA	Shadrach Lantei-Mills
9	FW	BAN	Amir Hakim Bappy
10	FW	LBN	Mohammad Haider Awada
12	FW	BAN	Md Nazim Uddin
13	DF	BAN	Shakil Ahmed
14	MF	BAN	Samor Joy Tanchangya
15	MF	BAN	Akkas Ali
16	FW	BAN	Md Umor Faruq Mithu
17	FW	BAN	Arifur Rahman
18	MF	BAN	Md Ratul Hasan
19	MF	BAN	Khandoker Ashraful Islam

No.	Pos.	Nation	Player
20	MF	BAN	Md Shahidul Islam Sumon
21	DF	BAN	Sadekujaman Fahim
22	GK	BAN	Md Mohiuddin Ranu
23	DF	BAN	Apurbo Mali
24	DF	BAN	Md Ariful Islam Sakhawat
25	DF	IND	Prosenjit Chakraborty
26	MF	BAN	Md Shawon
27	FW	BAN	Md Shakil Ali
31	GK	BAN	Md Salim
32	FW	BAN	Md Nazmul Ahmed Shakil
33	GK	BAN	Md Tanvir Ahamed
39	MF	BAN	Abdullah Junaid Chisty
40	FW	BAN	Azmol Gazi
44	FW	BAN	Shawon Ritchil
69	MF	BAN	Md Mahmudul Hasan
70	MF	BAN	Didarul Alam
71	DF	BAN	Mir Asfaruddin Ahmed

== Transfer ==
=== In ===
No.	Pos	Player	Previous club	Fee	Date	Source
32	LB	Md Shakil Ahmed	Fortis FC	Free Transfer	25 July 2025	
13	FW	Amir Hakim Bappy	Dhaka Wanderers Club	Free Transfer	25 July 2025	
12	FW	Arifur Rahman	Bangladesh Police FC	Free Transfer	26 July 2025	
39	GK	Md Selim	Dhaka Wanderers Club	Free Transfer	26 July 2025	
9	FW	(Lebanon) Haidar Awada	(Lebanon) Salam Zgharta FC	Free Transfer	30 July 2025	
35	DF	(Ghana) Ben Quansah	(India) TRAU FC	Free Transfer	1 August 2025	
15	MF	Shahidul Islam Sumon	Dhaka Wanderers Club	Free Transfer	9 August 2025	
22	DF	Prosenjit Chakraborty	Kidderpore SC	Free Transfer	15 August 2025	

== Competitions ==
Win Draw Loss Fixtures

=== Overall ===
Competition	First match	Last match	Final Position
BFL	26 September 2025	23 May 2026	9th of 10
Federation Cup	2 December 2025	21 April 2026	Group stage

=== Overview ===
Competition	Record							
Competition	Pld	W	D	L	GF	GA	GD	Win %
BFL	18	3	5	10	12	28	−16	16.67
Federation Cup	4	0	0	4	0	14	−14	0.00
Total	22	3	5	14	12	42	−30	13.64

Source: Competitions

=== Premier League ===
==== League table ====
Pos	Team	Pld	W	D	L	GF	GA	GD	Pts
6	Rahmatganj	18	6	5	7	21	25	−4	23
7	Brothers Union	18	4	5	9	18	29	−11	17
8	PWD	18	4	5	9	15	28	−13	17
9	Arambagh	18	3	5	10	12	28	−16	14
10	Fakirerpool	18	2	4	12	13	44	−31	10

Source: Soccerway
Rules for classification: 1) Points; 2) Goal difference; 3) Number of goals scored.

==== Results summary ====
Overall								Home						Away					
Pld	W	D	L	GF	GA	GD	Pts	W	D	L	GF	GA	GD	W	D	L	GF	GA	GD
18	3	5	10	12	28	−16	14	2	1	6	4	14	−10	1	4	4	8	14	−6

Source: Soccerway

==== Results by round ====
Round	1	2	3	4	5	6	7	8	9	10	11	12	13	14	15	16	17	18
Ground	A	H	H	H	A	H	A	H	A	H	A	A	A	H	A	H	A	H
Result	D	L	L	L	L	W	D	L	L	D	W	L	D	W	D	L	L	L
Position	5	7	9	10	10	10	9	10	10	10	9	10	9	8	8	8	9	9

Source: Matches
A = Away; H = Home; W = Win; D = Draw; L = Loss; P = Postponed

==== Matches ====
26 September 2025 1	Fakirerpool YMC	1–1	Arambagh KS	Manikganj
14:45 BST (UTC+6)	M. Shanto (yellow card) 45'; M. Kahraba (yellow card) 45+5' (goal) 90+1'	Report	M. Obaidullah (yellow card) 45+5'; Y. Denapo 58'	Stadium: Shaheed Miraj–Tapan Stadium; Referee: Bhubon Mohon Tarafder

20 October 2025 2	Arambagh KS	0–1	PWD Sports Club	Manikganj
14:45 BST (UTC+6)	Islam Sakhawat (yellow card) 90+3'	Report	A. Turaev 22'; M. Ratul (yellow card) 68'; R. Dukhu (yellow card) 86'	Stadium: Shaheed Miraj–Tapan Stadium; Referee: Md Junayed Sharif

24 November 2025 3	Arambagh KS	0–2	Bashundhara Kings	Manikganj
14:45 BST (UTC+6)	B. Quansah (yellow card) 19'	Report	Dorielton 75' (pen.), 82'	Stadium: Shaheed Miraj–Tapan Stadium; Referee: Jashim Akther

28 November 2025 4	Arambagh KS	0–1	Fortis FC	Manikganj
14:30 BST (UTC+6)	S. Ahmed (yellow card) 27'; Md Rokey (yellow card) 42'	Report	Riaj Uddin Sagor 16'; Sajed Hasan Jummon Nijum (yellow card) 43'; Sani Das (yellow card) 64'; A. Fahad (red card) 74'	Stadium: Shaheed Miraj–Tapan Stadium; Referee: Golam Mushed Chowdhury Nayon

6 December 2025 5	Rahmatganj MFS	3–0	Arambagh KS	Munshiganj
14:30 BST (UTC+6)	S. Kanform 37'; A. Limbu 42'; A. Jammeh 68'	Report		Stadium: Shaheed Bir Sreshtho Flight Lieutenant Matiur Rahman Stadium; Referee: Mahmud Zamal Farouqee Nahid

12 December 2025 6	Arambagh KS	2–0	Brothers Union	Manikganj
14:30 BST (UTC+6)	Mohammed Shawon 33' (yellow card) 75'; Amir Hakim Bappy (yellow card) 45'; B. Quansah (yellow card) 45'; K. Fahad 45+2' (yellow card) 69'; Azad Hossen (yellow card) 80'	Report	D. Brossou (yellow card) 18'; J. Bhuyan (yellow card) 90+3'	Stadium: Shaheed Miraj–Tapan Stadium; Referee: Md Anisur Rahman

20 December 2025 7	Mohammedan SC	1–1	Arambagh KS	Cumilla
14:30 BST (UTC+6)	M. Mithu 25'	Report	Shadrach Lantei-Mills (yellow card) 30'; Amir Hakim Bappy 39'; B. Quansah (yellow card) 76'; Akkas Ali (yellow card) 84'	Stadium: Shaheed Dhirendranath Datta Stadium; Referee: Md Jashim Akhter

26 December 2025 8	Arambagh KS	1–3	Bangladesh Police FC	Manikganj
14:30 BST (UTC+6)		Report	A. Ghalan 37', 52'; A. Islam 42'	Stadium: Shaheed Miraj–Tapan Stadium; Referee: Mahmud Zamal Farouqee Nahid

3 January 2025 9	Abahani Limited Dhaka	3–0	Arambagh KS	Cumilla
14:30 BST (UTC+6)	S. Diabate 9', 60'; B. Matos 40'; Sayed Hossain Sayem (yellow card) 90+1'	Report		Stadium: Shaheed Dhirendranath Datta Stadium; Referee: Md Junayed Sharif

6 March 2025 10	Arambagh KS	1–1	Fakirerpool YMC	Manikganj
14:45 BST (UTC+6)	Mohammed Jahedul Alam (yellow card) 51'; K. Kazito 79'; Shadrach Lantei-Mills (yellow card) 87'	Report	Shihab Mia (yellow card) 15'; Louis Lansana Beavogui 83' (pen.)	Stadium: Shaheed Miraj-Tapan Stadium; Referee: Bituraj Barua

14 March 2025 11	PWD Sports Club	0–3	Arambagh KS	Gazipur
14:45 BST (UTC+6)	Jonathan Santana (yellow card) 42'	Report	K. Kizito 31', 43'; Shadrach Lantei-Mills 73'	Stadium: Shaheed Barkat Stadium; Referee: Md Nazmul Huda

11 April 2026 12	Bashundhara Kings	2–1	Arambagh KS	Dhaka
15:30 BST (UTC+6)	Dorielton 25'; S. Emmanuel 28'	Report	Shadrach Lantei-Mills (yellow card) 40' (goal) 64'; Md Ariful Islam Sakhawat (yellow card) 90+2'	Stadium: Bashundhara Kings Arena; Referee: Md Nazmul Huda

17 April 2025 13	Fortis FC	0–0	Arambagh KS	Dhaka
15:30 BST (UTC+6)		Report		Stadium: Bashundhara Kings Arena; Referee: Md Symoon Hasan Sany

24 April 2026 14	Arambagh KS	1–0	Rahmatganj MFS	Manikganj
15:30 BST (UTC+6)	Shadrach Lantei-Mills (yellow card) 41'; Kwame Kizito 46' (yellow card) 90+6'; Md Shawon (yellow card) 60'	Report	Mohamed Munna (yellow card) 45+2'; Andrews Kwadwo Appau (yellow card) 81'	Stadium: Shaheed Miraj-Tapan Stadium; Referee: SM Junayed Sharif

30 April 2026 15	Brothers Union	2–2	Arambagh KS	Munshiganj
15:30 BST (UTC+6)	Monir Alam (yellow card) 45+6'; Mohsin Ahmed 51' (pen.); Md Meraj Pradhan 80'	Report	K. Kizito 14' (pen.) (yellow card) 33'; Md Rokey (yellow card) 23'; Nikson Chakma (yellow card) 28'; B. Quansah 45+8'	Stadium: Shaheed Bir Sreshtho Flight Lt. Matiur Rahman Stadium; Referee: Bituraj Barua

9 May 2026 16	Arambagh KS	0–2	Mohammedan SC	Manikganj
15:45 BST (UTC+6)	Nikson Chakma (yellow card) 13'	Report	Raju Ahmed Zisan 52'; Rahim Uddin 76'	Stadium: Shaheed Miraj-Tapan Stadium; Referee: Md Alamgir Sarker

15 May 2026 17	Bangladesh Police FC	2–0	Arambagh KS	Gazipur
15:45 BST (UTC+6)	Ismail Hossen (yellow card) 21'; M. Rahul 54'; Foday Darboe (yellow card) 75'; S. Kagimu 90+13'	Report	Apu Ahammad (yellow card) 4'	Stadium: Shaheed Barkat Stadium; Referee: Md Junayed Sharif

23 May 2026 18	Arambagh KS	0–4	Abahani Limited Dhaka	Manikganj
15:45 BST (UTC+6)	Mohiuddin Ranu (yellow card) 90+6'	Report	E. Ogbugh 43'; Y. Khan (yellow card) 69'; S. Diabate 82'; Nikson Chakma 88' (o.g.); S. Morsalin 90+6'	Stadium: Shaheed Miraj-Tapan Stadium; Referee: Md Junayed Sharif

=== Group B ===
Pos	Team	Pld	W	D	L	GF	GA	GD	Pts	Qualification
1	Bashundhara Kings	4	2	2	0	10	2	+8	8	Qualified for QRF 1
2	Mohammedan SC	4	2	2	0	8	3	+5	8	Advanced to QRF 2
3	Bangladesh Police	4	2	0	2	6	8	−2	6	
4	Fortis FC	4	1	2	1	7	4	+3	5	
5	Arambagh KS	4	0	0	4	0	14	−14	0	

Source: Sofascore

2 December 2025	Arambagh KS	0–1	Bangladesh Police	Dhaka
14:30 BST (UTC+6)		Report	P. Henrique 79'	Stadium: Bashundhara Kings Arena; Referee: Bhubon Mohon Tarafder

16 December 2025	Arambagh KS	0–4	Fortis FC	Dhaka
14:30 BST (UTC+6)		Report	Sajed Hasan Jummon Nijum 26'; P. Babou 33' (pen.); O. Okafor 68'; Md Murshed Ali 75'	Stadium: Bashundhara Kings Arena; Referee: Md Nasir Uddin

7 April 2026	Arambagh KS	0–5	Bashundhara Kings	Comilla
14:30 BST (UTC+6)		Report	Dorielton 16', 55'; F. Fahim 23'; S. Emmanuel 32'; S. Rana 67'	Stadium: Shaheed Dhirendranath Datta Stadium; Referee: Md Jalal Uddin

21 April 2026	Arambagh KS	0–4	Mohammedan SC	Comilla
14:45 BST (UTC+6)		Report	Md Jewel Mia 36'; Sourav Dewan 76', 83', 89'	Stadium: Shaheed Dhirendranath Datta Stadium; Referee: SM Jashim Akhter

== Statistics ==
=== Goalscorers ===
As of 23 May 2026

Rank	Player	Position	Total	BFL	Federation Cup
1	(Ghana) Kwame Kizito	FW	5	5	0
2	(Bangladesh) Mohammed Shawon	MF	1	1	0
2	(Bangladesh) Amir Hakim Bappy	FW	1	1	0
2	(Bangladesh) Kazi Rahad Mia	DF	1	1	0
2	(Nigeria) Yaya John Denapo	FW	1	1	0
2	(Brazil) Jonathan Santana	DF	1	1	0
2	(Ghana) Shadrach Lantei-Mills	MF	1	1	0
2	(Ghana) Ben Quansah	DF	1	1	0
Total			12	12	0
