= 2024–25 Dhaka Wanderers Club season =

Dhaka Wanderers Club 2024–25 football season

Dhaka Wanderers Club
2024–25 season
- President: Mohammad Abdus Salam
- Stadium: Shaheed Barkat Stadium
- Bangladesh Premier League: 9th
- Federation Cup: Group stage
- Independence Cup: Not Held
- Top goalscorer: League: Sakib Bepari (4 goals); All: Sakib Bepari (4 goals)
- Biggest win: 2–1 Vs Chittagong Abahani (Away); 9 May 2025 (Premier League)
- Biggest defeat: 0–8 Vs Brothers Union; 17 December 2024 (Federation Cup)

The 2023–24 season was Dhaka Wanderers Club's 88th season in existence and 1st season in the Bangladesh Premier League. It also marks the club's return to top-flight football following their relegation from the 2005 Dhaka Premier Division League. In addition to the domestic league, Wanderers are participated in this season's edition of the Federation Cup. The season covered the period from 1 June 2024 to 31 May 2025.

== Transfer ==
=== In ===
| No. | Pos | Player | Previous club | Fee | Date | Source |
|---|---|---|---|---|---|---|
| 11 | MF | Shakil Ali | Chittagong Abahani Limited | Free | 17 July 2024 | |
| 4 | DF | Mohammad Emon | Bangladesh Police FC | Free | 17 July 2024 | |
| 22 | MF | Nazmul Islam Rasel | Rahmatganj MFS | Free | 25 July 2024 | |
| 1 | GK | Hamidur Rahman Remon | Sheikh Jamal DC | Free | 26 July 2024 | |
| 20 | DF | Kazi Rahad Mia | Mohammedan SC | Free | 26 July 2024 | |
| 8 | MF | Md Mithu | Bangladesh Police FC | Free | 27 July 2024 | |
| 29 | DF | Khalekurzaman Sabuj | Bangladesh Police FC | Free | 29 July 2024 | |
| 7 | MF | Md Al Amin | Rahmatganj MFS | Free | 30 July 2024 | |
| 13 | FW | Amir Hakim Bappy | Fortis FC | Free | 30 July 2024 | |
| 19 | FW | Saief Shamsud | Bangladesh Police FC | Free | 30 July 2024 | |
| 3 | DF | Abid Ahmed | Sheikh Russel KC | Free | 30 July 2024 | |
| 24 | DF | Monir Hossain | Brothers Union | Free | 1 August 2024 | |
| 25 | FW | Sakib Bepari | Abahani Limited Dhaka | Free | 1 August 2024 | |
| 10 | FW | (The Gambia) Suleiman Sillah | Free agent | Free | 1 August 2024 | |
| 2 | FW | Miraz Molla | Bangladesh Police FC | Free | 14 August 2024 | |
| 16 | MF | Sahed Miah | Bangladesh Police FC | Free | 21 August 2024 | |
| 9 | FW | Md Jubayer Ahmed | Wari Club | Free | 21 August 2024 | |
| 31 | FW | Iftasam Rahman Jidan | Chittagong Abahani Limited | Free | 22 August 2024 | |
| 12 | FW | Safin Ahmed Shanto | Wari Club | Free | 22 August 2024 | |
| 17 | MF | Abu Sufian Yousuf Sifat | Bangladesh Police FC | Free | 22 August 2024 | |
| 15 | MF | Shahidul Islam Sumon | Sheikh Russel KC | Free | 22 August 2024 | |
| 45 | MF | Md Murad Hossain Chowdhury | Rahmatganj MFS | Free | 22 August 2024 | |
| 5 | DF | Imran Khan | BFF Elite Academy | Free | 22 August 2024 | |
| 36 | DF | Parvej Ahmed | BFF Elite Academy | Free | 22 August 2024 | |
| 22 | DF | Md Mahadud Hossain Fahim | Free agent | Free | 22 August 2024 | |
| 38 | MF | Md Sadik Ahmed | Kadamtol Sangsad | Free | 22 August 2024 | |

=== Retained ===
| No. | Pos | Player | Date | Source |
|---|---|---|---|---|
| 18 | DF | Shariar Hossain Rimon | 1 June 2024 | |
| 26 | MF | Md Shawon | 1 June 2024 | |

== Competitions ==
Win Draw Loss Fixtures

=== Overall ===
| Competition | First match | Last match | Final Position |
|---|---|---|---|
| BPL | 29 November 2024 | 27 May 2025 | 9th |
| Independence Cup | Did not held | | |
| Federation Cup | 17 December 2024 | 28 January 2025 | Group stage |

=== Overview ===
| Competition | Record | | | | | | | |
| Competition | Pld | W | D | L | GF | GA | GD | Win % |
|---|---|---|---|---|---|---|---|---|
| BPL | 18 | 3 | 1 | 14 | 14 | 55 | −41 | 16.67 |
| Federation Cup | 4 | 0 | 0 | 4 | 1 | 18 | −17 | 0.00 |
| Total | 22 | 3 | 1 | 18 | 15 | 73 | −58 | 13.64 |

Source: Competitions

=== Premier League ===
==== League table ====
| Pos | Team | Pld | W | D | L | GF | GA | GD | Pts | Qualification or relegation |
|---|---|---|---|---|---|---|---|---|---|---|
| 6 | Fortis | 18 | 6 | 9 | 3 | 24 | 15 | +9 | 27 | |
| 7 | Bangladesh Police | 18 | 8 | 3 | 7 | 23 | 24 | −1 | 27 | |
| 8 | Fakirerpool | 18 | 6 | 1 | 11 | 23 | 54 | −31 | 19 | |
| 9 | Dhaka Wanderers (R) | 18 | 3 | 1 | 14 | 14 | 55 | −41 | 10 | Relegation to BCL |
| 10 | Chittagong Abahani (R) | 18 | 1 | 0 | 17 | 7 | 50 | −43 | 3 | Relegation to BCL |

Source: Soccerway
Rules for classification: 1) Points; 2) Goal difference; 3) Goals scored.
(R) Relegated

==== Results summary ====
| Overall | | | | | | | | Home | | | | | | Away | | | | | |
| Pld | W | D | L | GF | GA | GD | Pts | W | D | L | GF | GA | GD | W | D | L | GF | GA | GD |
|---|---|---|---|---|---|---|---|---|---|---|---|---|---|---|---|---|---|---|---|
| 18 | 3 | 1 | 14 | 14 | 55 | −41 | 10 | 2 | 0 | 7 | 6 | 28 | −22 | 1 | 1 | 7 | 8 | 27 | −19 |

Source: Soccerway

==== Results by round ====
| Round | 1 | 2 | 3 | 4 | 5 | 6 | 7 | 8 | 9 | 10 | 11 | 12 | 13 | 14 | 15 | 16 | 17 | 18 |
|---|---|---|---|---|---|---|---|---|---|---|---|---|---|---|---|---|---|---|
| Ground | H | A | H | A | H | A | H | A | H | A | H | A | H | A | H | A | H | A |
| Result | L | L | L | D | W | L | L | L | L | L | L | L | W | W | L | L | L | L |
| Position | 9 | 9 | 9 | 9 | 8 | 8 | 8 | 9 | 9 | 9 | 9 | 9 | 9 | 9 | 9 | 9 | 9 | 9 |

Source: Matches
A = Away; H = Home; W = Win; D = Draw; L = Loss; P = Postponed

=== Matches ===
| 29 November 2024 1 | Dhaka Wanderers Club | 0–6 | Mohammedan | Gazipur |
| 14:30 BST (UTC+6) | | Report | Emmanuel 5'; Minhajul Abedin Ballu 19'; Diabate 24' 89'; Topu (yellow card) 70'; Boateng 80'; Sourav Dewan 90+3' | Stadium: Shaheed Barkat Stadium; Referee: Mohamad Alamgir |

| 7 December 2024 2 | Abahani Limited Dhaka | 1–0 | Dhaka Wanderers Club | Comilla |
| 14:30 BST (UTC+6) | Iqbal (yellow card) 34'; Reza 58' | Report | Emon (yellow card) 23'; Md Monir Hossain (yellow card) 41'; Sakib Bepari (yellow card) 82' | Stadium: Comilla Stadium; Referee: Bituraj Barua |

| 14 December 2024 3 | Dhaka Wanderers Club | 0–4 | Bangladesh Police | Gazipur |
| 14:30 BST (UTC+6) | Shahidul Islam Sumon (yellow card) 19'; Islam Rasel (yellow card) 71' | Report | Al-Amin 36' 41'; Roy 79'; Kirmane 82' | Stadium: Shaheed Barkat Stadium; Referee: Mohamad Alamgir |

| 21 December 2024 4 | Fortis | 1–1 | Dhaka Wanderers Club | Dhaka |
| 14:30 BST (UTC+6) | Hryshyn 52'; Jasur Jumaev (yellow card) 77' | Report | Md Sohag Mia (yellow card) 25'; Sakib Bepari 37'; Md Shawon (yellow card) 71' | Stadium: Bashundhara Kings Arena; Referee: Sobuj Kumar Das |

| 27 December 2024 5 | Dhaka Wanderers Club | 1–0 | Chittagong Abahani | Gazipur |
| 14:30 BST (UTC+6) | Shakil Ali 42'; Rahad Mia (yellow card) 77'; Md Mithu (yellow card) 80'; Abid Ahmed (yellow card) 82'; Md Mahadud Hossain Fahim (yellow card) 90+3' | Report | Raihan Hasan (yellow card) 32'; Golam Rabby (yellow card) 88' | Stadium: Shaheed Barkat Stadium; Referee: Sabuj Kumar Das |

| 4 January 2025 6 | Rahmatganj MFS | 6–1 | Dhaka Wanderers Club | Munshiganj |
| 14:45 BST (UTC+6) | Md Sayde (yellow card) 18'; S. Boateng 23', 37', 44', 63', 66', 70' | Report | Saif Shamsud 50'; Abu Sufian Yousuf Sifat (yellow card) 51' | Stadium: Shaheed Bir Sreshtho Flight Lieutenant Matiur Rahman Stadium; Referee: Abul Kalam Rumon |

| 10 January 2025 7 | Dhaka Wanderers Club | 1–4 | Brothers Union | Gazipur |
| 14:45 BST (UTC+6) | Abu Sufian Yousuf Sifat 44'; Md Shawon (yellow card) 78' | Report | Rahmat 12'; Sazzad 20'; Mady Ceesay (yellow card) 87'; Eleta 88'; Cheikh Sene 90+3' | Stadium: Shaheed Barkat Stadium; Referee: Md Alamgir Sarker |

| 17 January 2025 8 | Fakirerpool YMC | 4–1 | Dhaka Wanderers Club | Gazipur |
| 14:45 BST (UTC+6) | Rafayel 17'; Md Ganto (yellow card) 40'; Evgeniy Kochnev 48'; Jakhonov (yellow card) 67' (goal) 69'; Turaev 82' (pen.) | Report | Rasel (yellow card) 20'; Sakib Bepari (yellow card) 72' (goal) 90+3' | Stadium: Shaheed Barkat Stadium; Referee: Nazmul Huda |

| 24 January 2025 9 | Dhaka Wanderers Club | 0–5 | Bashundhara Kings | Gazipur |
| 14:45 BST (UTC+6) | Nazmul (yellow card) 21'; Md Shawon (yellow card) 54'; Shakib Biswas (yellow card) 74' | Report | Fernandes 11'; Sohel 29'; Topu 38'; Saad (yellow card) 56'; Rakib 66'; Figueira 75' | Stadium: Shaheed Barkat Stadium; Referee: Taposh Roy |

| 21 February 2025 10 | Mohammedan SC | 3–0 | Dhaka Wanderers Club | Comilla |
| 15:00 BST (UTC+6) | Muzaffarov 38'; Rahim Uddin 81'; Diabate 89' | Report | Md Imran Khan (yellow card) 16'; Shakib Bishwas (yellow card) 62' | Stadium: Shaheed Dhirendranath Datta Stadium; Referee: Mohammed Jalal Uddin |

| 12 April 2025 11 | Dhaka Wanderers Club | 1–4 | Abahani Limited Dhaka | Gazipur |
| 15:30 BST (UTC+6) | Abid Ahmed (yellow card) 33'; Sakib Bepari 55' | Report | Raphael 48', 83'; Sumon 51'; Ridoy 57' | Stadium: Shaheed Barkat Stadium; Referee: Bituraj Barua |

| 25 April 2025 12 | Bangladesh Police FC | 1–0 | Dhaka Wanderers Club | Mymensingh |
| 15:30 BST (UTC+6) | Alexander Moreno (yellow card) 29'; Jahongir Qurbonboyev 84' | Report | N. Rasel (yellow card) 71' | Stadium: Rafiq Uddin Bhuiyan Stadium; Referee: Golam Mourshed Choudhury Nayon |

| 2 May 2025 13 | Dhaka Wanderers Club | 1–0 | Fortis FC | Gazipur |
| 15:45 BST (UTC+6) | N. Rasel (yellow card) 17'; Abu Sufian Yousuf Sifat 90+6' (yellow card) 90+7' | Report | | Stadium: Shaheed Barkat Stadium; Referee: Jashim Akther |

| 9 May 2025 14 | Chittagong Abahani | 1–2 | Dhaka Wanderers Club | Mymensingh |
| 16:00 BST (UTC+6) | Mohamed Shadhin (yellow card) 12'; Rabbi 45+5'; Kofi Dabanka (yellow card) 59'; Lansana (yellow card) 61' | Report | Monir Hossain (yellow card) 19'; Nazmul 37', 45+1' | Stadium: Rafiq Uddin Bhuiyan Stadium; Referee: Md Alamgir Sarker |

| 17 May 2025 15 | Dhaka Wanderers Club | 1–3 | Rahmatganj MFS | Gazipur |
| 16:00 BST (UTC+6) | Princewill Mutah 48'; Md Shawon (yellow card) 66'; Saiful Islam Khan (yellow card) 85'; M. Emon (yellow card) 89' | Report | E. Boateng 1' (pen.) (yellow card) 52'; M. Royal 35' (yellow card) 77'; T. Uddin 84' | Stadium: Shaheed Barkat Stadium; Referee: Anisur Rahman Sagor |

| 20 May 2025 16 | Brothers Union | 5–0 | Dhaka Wanderers Club | Munshiganj |
| 16:15 BST (UTC+6) | Assan Njie 8', 86'; Zakaria Darboe 35'; Mouhamed Becaye Diarra 43', 75' | Report | Gustavo Henrique (yellow card) 32' | Stadium: Shaheed Bir Sreshtho Flight Lieutenant Matiur Rahman Stadium; Referee: Abul Kalam Rumon |

| 23 May 2025 17 | Dhaka Wanderers Club | 1–2 | Fakirerpool YMC | Gazipur |
| 16:00 BST (UTC+6) | Parvej Ahmed (yellow card) 27'; Mohammad Habibur Rahman (yellow card) 83'; Khusan Ganizhonov 83' | Report | Jahid Hossain (yellow card) 39'; Ben Ibrahim Ouattara 22', 72' | Stadium: Shaheed Barkat Stadium; Referee: Taposh Roy |

| 27 May 2025 18 | Bashundhara Kings | 5–3 | Dhaka Wanderers Club | Dhaka |
| 16:45 BST (UTC+6) | Rakib 41'; Morsalin (yellow card) 37' (goal) 42', 45+5', 68'; Md Rabby 81'; Md Yousuf Ali (yellow card) 86' | Report | Sadik Ahmed 45'; Shahidul Islam 49'; Nazmul (yellow card) 65'; Mohammad Manzurul Karim 90+4' | Stadium: Bashundhara Kings Arena; Referee: Abul Kalam Rumon |

=== Federation Cup ===
==== Group A ====
| Pos | Team | Pld | W | D | L | GF | GA | GD | Pts | Qualification |
|---|---|---|---|---|---|---|---|---|---|---|
| 1 | Bashundhara Kings | 4 | 3 | 0 | 1 | 9 | 4 | +5 | 9 | Qualified for QRF 1 |
| 2 | Brothers Union | 4 | 2 | 1 | 1 | 9 | 1 | +8 | 7 | Advanced to QRF 2 |
| 3 | Fortis | 4 | 2 | 1 | 1 | 5 | 1 | +4 | 7 | |
| 4 | Bangladesh Police | 4 | 1 | 2 | 1 | 4 | 4 | 0 | 5 | |
| 5 | Dhaka Wanderers | 4 | 0 | 0 | 4 | 1 | 18 | −17 | 0 | |

Source: Soccerway
Rules for classification: Group stages tiebreakers

| 17 December 2024 | Brothers Union | 8–0 | Dhaka Wanderers Club | Mymensingh |
| 14:30 BST (UTC+6) | Rabbi 8'; Mustapha Drammeh 24', 65', 70'; Sazzad 28', 48', 81'; Kingsley 90+3' | Report | | Stadium: Rafiq Uddin Bhuiyan Stadium; Referee: Md Nazmul Huda |

| 31 December 2024 | Fortis FC | 3–0 | Dhaka Wanderers Club | Cumilla |
| 14:30 BST (UTC+6) | Joy Kumar 45+2', 75'; Nova 89' | Report | | Stadium: Shaheed Dhirendranath Datta Stadium; Referee: Md Jalal Uddin |

| 14 January 2025 | Bangladesh Police FC | 2–1 | Dhaka Wanderers Club | Dhaka |
| 14:30 BST (UTC+6) | M. Rabby 84'; Esanur Rahman 86' | Report | Emon 42' (pen.) | Stadium: Bashundhara Kings Arena; Referee: Anisur Rahman Sagor |

| 28 January 2025 | Bashundhara Kings | 5–0 | Dhaka Wanderers Club | Cumilla |
| 14:45 BST (UTC+6) | Miguel 18'; Sohel Sr. 40'; Rasel 55' (o.g.); Sohel Jr. 70'; Topu 77' | Report | | Stadium: Shaheed Dhirendranath Datta Stadium; Referee: Bhubon Mohon Torafder |

=== Goalscorers ===
As of 27 May 2025

| Rank | Player | Position | Total | BPL | Independence Cup | Federation Cup |
|---|---|---|---|---|---|---|
| 1 | (Bangladesh) Sakib Bepari | FW | 4 | 4 | 0 | 0 |
| 2 | (Bangladesh) Abu Sufian Yousuf Sifat | MF | 2 | 2 | 0 | 0 |
| 2 | (Bangladesh) Nazmul Islam Rasel | MF | 2 | 2 | 0 | 0 |
| 3 | (Bangladesh) Shakil Ali | MF | 1 | 1 | 0 | 0 |
| 3 | (Bangladesh) Mohammad Emon | DF | 1 | 0 | 0 | 1 |
| 3 | (Bangladesh) Saif Shamsud | FW | 1 | 1 | 0 | 0 |
| 3 | (Bangladesh) Md Sadik Ahmed | MF | 1 | 1 | 0 | 0 |
| 3 | (Bangladesh) Md Manzurul Karim | FW | 1 | 1 | 0 | 0 |
| 3 | (Bangladesh) Shahidul Islam Sumon | MF | 1 | 1 | 0 | 0 |
| 3 | (Cameroon) Princewill Mutah | MF | 1 | 1 | 0 | 0 |
| 3 | (Uzbekistan) Kushan Ganijanov | DF | 1 | 1 | 0 | 0 |
| Total | | | 16 | 15 | 0 | 1 |
