= 2019 BK Häcken season =

BK Häcken
2019 season
- Chairman: Anders Billström
- Manager: Andreas Alm
- Stadium: Bravida Arena
- Allsvenskan: 6th
- Svenska Cupen: Quarter-finals
- Europa League: Second qualifying round
- Top goalscorer: League: Paulinho (11); All: Paulinho (13)

The 2019 BK Häcken season is BK Häcken's 79th season of existence, and its 19th season competing in the Allsvenskan, the top tier of football in Sweden. The club has been a fixture in the Allsvenskan each season since 2009. In addition to the 2019 Allsvenskan, BK Häcken competed in the Svenska Cupen, and the UEFA Europa League.

== Transfers and loans ==
From January 1, 2019. Arrivals include players returning from loans. Departures include players out on loan.

=== Arrivals ===
Position	Player	Transferred from	Date	Fee
MF	(Sweden) Ali Youssef	(Sweden) BK Häcken U19	1 January 2019	None
DF	(Sweden) Oskar Sverrisson	(Sweden) Mjällby AIF	12 January 2019	Free Transfer
FW	(Ghana) Kwame Kizito	Without Club	1 February 2019	None
MF	(Iraq) (Sweden) Ahmed Yasin	(Qatar) Al-Khor SC	12 January 2019	Free Transfer
DF	(Sweden) Teodor Wålemark	(Sweden) BK Häcken U19	1 July 2019	None
FW	(Sweden) (Serbia) Alexander Nadj	Without Club	15 July 2019	None

=== Departures ===
Position	Player	Transferred to	Date	Fee
GK	(Sweden) Christoffer Källqvist	Retired	1 January 2019	None
DF	(Sweden) (Bosnia and Herzegovina) Ali Suljić	IF Brommapojkarna	12 January 2019	Free Transfer
FW	(Sweden) Lucas Hedlund	Utsiktens BK	12 January 2019	Free Transfer
DF	(Sweden) Emil Wahlström	GAIS	10 February 2019	Free Transfer
FW	(Sweden) (Turkey) Mervan Çelik	Without Club	18 July 2019	Released
FW	(Ghana) Nasiru Mohammed	PFC Levski Sofia	23 July 2019	£225k

== Non-competitive ==
=== Pre-season Friendlies ===
21.11.2018	Norrby	3-2	BK Häcken	Borås
17:00	Vukojevic 2'; Savolainen 16'; Khayat 47'	Report	Ekpolo 52'; Kornbakk 56'	Stadium: Borås Arena; Attendance: 50; Referee: Fikret Buqa

== Competitive ==
=== Competition record ===
Competition	Record							
Competition	G	W	D	L	GF	GA	GD	Win %
Allsvenskan	30	14	7	9	44	29	+15	46.67
Svenska Cupen	5	4	0	1	13	3	+10	80.00
Europa League	2	0	1	1	0	3	−3	0.00
Total	37	18	8	11	57	35	+22	48.65

Last updated: 5 February 2021.
Source: Competitive matches

=== Allsvenskan ===
==== League table ====
Pos	Team	Pld	W	D	L	GF	GA	GD	Pts	Qualification or relegation
4	AIK	30	19	5	6	47	24	+23	62	
5	IFK Norrköping	30	16	9	5	54	26	+28	57	
6	BK Häcken	30	14	7	9	44	29	+15	49	
7	IFK Göteborg	30	13	9	8	46	31	+15	48	Qualification for the Europa League second qualifying round (Note: IFK Göteborg qualified for the Europa League second qualifying round by winning the 2019–20 Svenska Cupen.)
8	IF Elfsborg	30	11	10	9	44	45	−1	43	

Source: svenskfotboll.se (in Swedish)
Rules for classification: 1) Points; 2) Goal difference; 3) Goals scored; 4) Head-to-head points; 5) Head-to-head goal difference; 6) Head-to-head away goals scored; 7) Play-off
(Note: Play-off is only played if need to decide champion, teams for relegation or UEFA competition and will be played on a neutral ground).

==== Results by round ====
Round	1	2	3	4	5	6	7	8	9	10	11	12	13	14	15	16	17	18	19	20	21	22	23	24	25	26	27	28	29	30
Ground	A	H	A	H	A	H	H	A	H	A	H	A	H	A	H	A	A	H	H	A	A	H	H	A	H	A	H	A	H	A
Result	D	W	W	L	L	W	W	D	W	W	L	D	W	L	W	W	L	W	D	W	W	W	L	D	L	D	D	W	L	L
Position	7	4	2	2	7	6	3	3	3	2	5	5	4	5	4	4	6	4	5	5	5	4	5	5	6	6	6	6	6	6

W = Win; D = Draw; L = Loss

==== Game-by-game review ====
01.04.2019 Round 1	Malmö FF	1–1	Hacken	Malmö
19:00	Bengtsson (yellow card) 18'; Antonsson 46' (penalty missed) 55’ Christiansen (yellow card) 89'	Report	Ekpolo (yellow card) 52'; Friberg (yellow card) 73'; Irandust 76'	Stadium: Swedbank Stadion; Attendance: 17,543; Referee: Mohammed Al Hakim

06.04.2019 Round 2	Hacken	2-1	Helsingborg	Gothenburg
16:00	Paulinho 39' (pen.); Mohammed (yellow card) 42'; Jeremejeff 49'	Report	Randrup (yellow card) 38'; Abubakari (yellow card) 51'; Moro 86'	Stadium: Bravida Arena; Attendance: 4,548; Referee: Victor Wolf

13.04.2019 Round 3	Falkenberg	0-3	Hacken	Falkenberg
13:30	Peter (yellow card) 78'; Joza (yellow card) 87'	Report	Jeremejeff (yellow card) 25'; Ekpolo 52'; Paulinho 66', 75'	Stadium: Falcon Alkoholfri Arena; Attendance: 2,798; Referee: Glenn Nyberg

21.04.2019 Round 4	Hacken	0-1	Djurgården	Gothenburg
15:00	Faltsetas (yellow card) 14'; Berggren (yellow card) 20'; Mohammed (yellow card) 78'; Paulinho (yellow card) 82'; Lindgren (yellow card) 85'	Report	Karlstrom (yellow card) 15'; Radetinac (yellow card) 20'; Berg 51'	Stadium: Bravida Arena; Attendance: 4,579; Referee: Bojan Pandzic

24.04.2019 Round 5	AIK	1-0	Hacken	Stockholm
19:00	Sundgren (yellow card) 40' (goal) 76'; Larsson (yellow card) 45+1'; Linner (yellow card) 90+3'	Report	Lindgren (yellow card) 47'; Ekpolo (yellow card) 82'	Stadium: Friends Arena; Attendance: 11,131; Referee: Glenn Nyberg

28.04.2019 Round 6	Hacken	3-0	AFC Eskilstuna	Gothenburg
15:00	Andersson 64', 90+4'; Paulinho 73'	Report	Rashkaj (yellow card) 39'; Nalic (yellow card) 67'	Stadium: Bravida Arena; Attendance: 2,095; Referee: Fredrik Hansson

05.05.2019 Round 7	Hacken	1-0	Sundsvall	Gothenburg
15:00	Paulinho (penalty missed) 64’ (yellow card) 90+2'; Jeremejeff 71'	Report	Ciercoles (yellow card) 29'; Moreno (yellow card) 83'; Myrestam (yellow card) 90+3'	Stadium: Bravida Arena; Attendance: 2,561; Referee: Andreas Ekberg

11.05.2019 Round 8	Östersund	1-1	Hacken	Östersund
13:30	Isherwood 28'	Report	Jeremejeff 26'; Faltsetas (yellow card) 40'; Paulinho (yellow card) 43'; Ekpolo (yellow card) 86'	Stadium: Jamtkraft Arena; Attendance: 4,904; Referee: Stefan Johannesson

15.05.2019 Round 9	Hacken	1-0	Kalmar	Gothenburg
19:00	Andersson (yellow card) 66'; Yasin 67'; Celik (yellow card) 74'	Report	Froling (yellow card) 26'	Stadium: Bravida Arena; Attendance: 2,731; Referee: Kaspar Sjoberg

19.05.2019 Round 10	Sirius	3-4	Hacken	Uppsala
15:00	Lundholm 20' (pen.), 80' (pen.); Ceesay (yellow card) 30'; Haglund 66'; Bjornstrom (yellow card) 82'; Razak (yellow card) 90'	Report	Jeremejeff 8'; Ojala (yellow card) 17' (yellow-red card) 78' (goal) 28'; Paulinho 49'; Celik 51'; Friberg (yellow card) 60'; Yasin (yellow card) 83'	Stadium: Studenternas IP; Attendance: 3,047; Referee: Adam Ladeback

25.05.2019 Round 11	Hacken	1-2	Goteborg	Gothenburg
16:00	Yasin (red card) 64'; Jeremejeff 71'; Friberg (yellow card) 75'; Toivio (yellow card) 81'	Report	Vibe 9' (yellow card) 55'; Yusuf (yellow card) 47'; Wernersson (yellow card) 60'; Ohlsson (yellow card) 64'; Erlingmark (yellow card) 81'; Soder 90+7'	Stadium: Bravida Arena; Attendance: 6,316; Referee: Mohammed Al Hakim

02.06.2019 Round 12	Elfsborg	0-0	Hacken	Borås
15:00	Henriksson (yellow card) 20' (yellow-red card) 37'; Ellegaard (yellow card) 21'; Ishizaki (yellow card) 50'; Jonsson (yellow card) 75'; Strand (yellow card) 90+3'	Report	Lindgren (yellow card) 40'; Celik (yellow card) 53'; Paulinho (yellow card) 73'; Jeremejeff (yellow card) 90+3'	Stadium: Borås Arena; Attendance: 6,113; Referee: Andreas Ekberg

01.07.2019 Round 13	Hacken	2-0	Hammarby	Gothenburg
19:00	Ekpolo (yellow card) 8'; Mohammed 42'; Faltsetas (yellow card) 44'; Jeremejeff (yellow card) 45' (goal) 81'; Hammar (yellow card) 45+4'	Report	Khalili (yellow card) 33'; Fallman (yellow card) 43'; Fenger (red card) 44'	Stadium: Bravida Arena; Attendance: 4,897; Referee: Glenn Nyberg

07.07.2019 Round 14	IFK Norrköping	2-1	Hacken	Norrköping
15:00	Larsson 11'; Fransson (yellow card) 17'; Gerson (yellow card) 50'; Larsen (yellow card) 70'; Totte 79'	Report	Berggren (yellow card) 44' (goal) 71'; Paulinho (yellow card) 49'	Stadium: Ostgotaporten; Attendance: 6,433; Referee: Martin Strombergsson

14.07.2019 Round 15	Hacken	3-0	Örebro	Gothenburg
15:00	Irandust 57'; Jeremejeff 62'; Paulinho 74'	Report	Rogic (yellow card) 35'; Brorsson (yellow card) 73'	Stadium: Bravida Arena; Attendance: 5,162; Referee: Patrik Eriksson

20.07.2019 Round 16	Sundsvall	0-1	Hacken	Sundsvall
18:00	Ciercoles (yellow card) 36'; Sema (penalty missed) 37’ Blomqvist (yellow card) 43'	Report	Abrahamsson (yellow card) 35'; Friberg 59'; Irandust (yellow card) 72'	Stadium: NP3 Arena; Attendance: 4,060; Referee: Magnus Lindgren

28.07.2019 Round 17	Djurgården	2-0	Hacken	Stockholm
15:00	Une-Larsson 80'; Chilufya 90+2'	Report	Yasin (yellow card) 84'	Stadium: Tele2 Arena; Attendance: 10,748; Referee: Andreas Ekberg

04.08.2019 Round 18	Hacken	4-1	Sirius	Gothenburg
17:30	Toivio 9'; Friberg (yellow card) 19'; Berggren 25'; Jeremejeff 32'; Ekpolo (yellow card) 42'; Lundberg 55'	Report	Thor 18'; Larson (yellow card) 41'; Bjornstrom (yellow card) 47'; Haglund (yellow card) 63'	Stadium: Bravida Arena; Attendance: 1,898; Referee: Fredrik Klitte

11.08.2019 Round 19	Hacken	1-1	Malmö FF	Gothenburg
15:00	Ekpolo (yellow card) 43'; Paulinho (yellow card) 75'; Friberg 79'	Report	Molins (penalty missed) 26’ Safari (yellow card) 27'; Lewicki (yellow card) 38'; Christiansen 57'; Brorsson (yellow card) 61'	Stadium: Bravida Arena; Attendance: 4,254; Referee: Mohammed Al Hakim

18.08.2019 Round 20	Örebro	1-2	Hacken	Örebro
15:00	Bertilsson (yellow card) 40'; Mehmeti 87' (yellow card) 87'	Report	Toivio 33'; Lundberg 80'; Abrahamsson (yellow card) 87'	Stadium: Behrn Arena; Attendance: 4,181; Referee: Glenn Nyberg

25.08.2019 Round 21	AFC Eskilstuna	0-2	Hacken	Eskilstuna
15:00	Tsveiba (yellow card) 54'; Kozica (penalty missed) 68’	Report	Abrahamsson (yellow card) 67'; Hammar 86'; Paulinho 90+3'	Stadium: Tunavallen; Attendance: 1,876; Referee: Patrik Eriksson

01.09.2019 Round 22	Hacken	4-1	Falkenberg	Gothenburg
17:30	Paulinho 21', 90+4'; Irandust 28'; Kizito 85'	Report	Pogrebnyak 32'; Carlsson (yellow card) 76'	Stadium: Bravida Arena; Attendance: 2,452; Referee: Magnus Lindgren

15.09.2019 Round 23	Hacken	1-2	AIK	Gothenburg
15:00	Lindgren (yellow card) 46'; Paulinho 57' (yellow card) 69'; Friberg (yellow card) 70'	Report	Obasi 26'; Elyounoussi (yellow card) 40'; Larsson 66' (pen.); Mets (yellow card) 84'; Lindkvist (yellow card) 90+3'	Stadium: Bravida Arena; Attendance: 5,208; Referee: Glenn Nyberg

21.09.2019 Round 24	Kalmar	1-1	Hacken	Kalmar
16:00	Elm 21'; Magnusson (yellow card) 31'; Hagg-Johansson (yellow card) 38'; Holmstrom (yellow card) 65'	Report	Friberg (yellow card) 13'; Ekpolo (yellow card) 20'; Paulinho (yellow card) 36'; Kizito 66'	Stadium: Guldfågeln Arena; Attendance: 3,661; Referee: Martin Strombergsson

25.09.2019 Round 25	Hacken	1–2	Elfsborg	Gothenburg
19:00	Yasin 35' (pen.); Faltsetas (yellow card) 72'	Report	Karlsson 19'; Portillo (yellow card) 34'; Nilsen 55'; Gojani (yellow card) 60'; Strand (yellow card) 72'; Ronning (yellow card) 80'; Simon Olsson (yellow card) 90+1'	Stadium: Bravida Arena; Attendance: 2,686; Referee: Victor Wolf

29.09.2019 Round 26	Goteborg	0-0	Hacken	Gothenburg
15:00	Erlingmark (yellow card) 23'; Da Graca (yellow card) 30'; Holm (yellow card) 74'; Titi (yellow card) 76'	Report	Kizito (yellow card) 19'	Stadium: Gamla Ullevi; Attendance: 13,514; Referee: Bojan Pandžić

06.10.2019 Round 27	Hacken	1-1	Östersund	Gothenburg
15:00	Toivio (yellow card) 15'; Irandust 39'; Berggren (yellow card) 90+3'	Report	Ssewankambo (yellow card) 51'; Attah 58'; Mensiro (yellow card) 70'	Stadium: Bravida Arena; Attendance: 2,122; Referee: Stefan Johannesson

19.10.2019 Round 28	Helsingborg	0-2	Hacken	Helsingborg
13:30	Abubakari (red card) 30'; Gero (yellow card) 33'	Report	Paulinho 11' (pen.) (yellow card) 33'; Kizito 55'	Stadium: Olympia; Attendance: 7,339; Referee: Patrik Eriksson

27.10.2019 Round 29	Hacken	0-1	IFK Norrköping	Gothenburg
15:00	Ekpolo (yellow card) 14' (yellow-red card) 85'; Youssef (yellow card) 54'; Lindgren (yellow card) 86'	Report	Lauritsen 88'	Stadium: Bravida Arena; Attendance: 2,969; Referee: Magnus Lindgren

02.11.2019 Round 30	Hammarby	4-1	Hacken	Stockholm
13:00	Fenger (yellow card) 2'; Magyar (yellow card) 17'; Kacaniklic 35'; Djurdjic 66'; Lindgren 70' (o.g.); Solheim 90+5'	Report	Youssef (yellow card) 4'; Nilsson 51'; Lindgren (yellow card) 88'	Stadium: Tele2 Arena; Attendance: 31,037; Referee: Mohammed Al Hakim

=== Svenska Cupen ===
==== Initial Rounds ====
21.08.2019 Second round	Qviding	1-3	BK Häcken	Gothenburg
18:00	Lindberg 74'	Report	Paulinho 34' (pen.), 85'; Yasin 90+3'	Stadium: Valhalla IP; Attendance: 789; Referee: Joakim Östling

==== Group stage ====
Pos	Team	Pld	W	D	L	GF	GA	GD	Pts	Qualification
1	BK Häcken	3	3	0	0	9	0	+9	9	Advance to Knockout stage
2	Östersunds FK	3	2	0	1	9	2	+7	6	
3	GAIS	3	1	0	2	4	8	−4	3	
4	Eskilsminne IF	3	0	0	3	1	13	−12	0	

Source: Swedish Football Association
Rules for classification: 1) Points; 2) Goal difference; 3) Goals scored; 4) Head-to-head record; 5) Highest ranked team

23.02.2020 Round 1	BK Häcken	3-0	GAIS	Gothenburg
16:30	Lindgren (yellow card) 11'; Lundberg 13'; Irandust 27'; Berggren (yellow card) 71'; Yasin 80'; Bengtsson (yellow card) 90+1'	Report	Yarsuvat (yellow card) 17'; Celik (yellow card) 71'	Stadium: Bravida Arena; Attendance: 2,661; Referee: Glenn Nyberg

29.02.2020 Round 2	Eskilsminne	0-4	BK Häcken	Helsingborg
14:30	Lundeberg (yellow card) 77'	Report	Toivio 45', 56'; Youssef 83'; Yasin 89'	Stadium: Olympiafältet Plan 10 konstgräs Attendance: 178; Referee: Kristoffer Karlsson

08.03.2020 Round 3	BK Häcken	2-0	Östersund	Gothenburg
14:30	Irandust 8'; Yasin (penalty missed) 22’ Ekpolo 35'; Lindgren (yellow card) 40'; Soderlund (yellow card) 65'	Report	Isherwood (yellow card) 27'; Sonko-Sundberg (yellow card) 84'; Turgott (yellow card) 85'	Stadium: Bravida Arena; Attendance: 1,145; Referee: Joakim Östling

==== Knockout stage ====
25.06.2020 Quarter-finals	BK Häcken	1-2	Elfsborg	Gothenburg
18:00	Bengtsson 58'; Yasin (yellow card) 78'; Andersson (yellow card) 89'	Report	Okumu (yellow card) 39'; Frick (yellow card) 45+2'; Alm 50'; McVey 71'; Strand (yellow card) 90+3'	Stadium: Bravida Arena; Attendance: 0 Referee: Glenn Nyberg

=== UEFA Europa League ===
==== Second qualifying round ====
25.07.2019 1st leg	(Netherlands) Alkmaar	0-0	(Sweden) BK Häcken	Alkmaar
20:30	Wijndal (yellow card) 19'	Report	Ekpolo (yellow card) 43'; Yasin (yellow card) 61'	Stadium: AFAS Stadion; Attendance: 11,492; Referee: (Ukraine) Serhiy Boiko

01.08.2019 2nd leg	(Sweden) BK Häcken	0-3 (0-3 agg.)	(Netherlands) Alkmaar	Gothenburg
18:30	Lindgren (yellow card) 39'	Report	Wuytens (yellow card) 17'; Stengs (yellow card) 39' (goal) 56'; Boadu 42'; Idrissi 67'	Stadium: Bravida Arena; Attendance: 3,845; Referee: (France) Frank Schneider

== Statistics ==
=== Appearances ===
As of 19 July 2019

This includes all competitive matches.

Rank	Pos	No.	Player	Allsvenskan	Svenska Cupen	UEFA Europa League	Total
1	GK	XX	(Sweden) NAME	0	0	0	0

=== Goalscorers ===
As of 19 July 2019

This includes all competitive matches.

Rnk	Pos	No.	Player	Allsvenskan	Svenska Cupen	Europa League	Total
1	FW	10	(Brazil) Paulinho	11	2	0	13
2	FW	9	(Sweden) Alexander Jeremejeff	8	0	0	8
3	MF	19	(Sweden) Daleho Irandust	4	2	0	6
4	MF	99	(Iraq) Ahmed Yasin	2	3	0	5
5	DF	22	(Finland) Joona Toivio	2	2	0	4
6	FW	16	(Ghana) Kwame Kizito	3	0	0	3
7	FW	11	(Sweden) Viktor Lundberg	2	1	0	3
8	DF	28	(Sweden) Adam Andersson	2	0	0	2
9	MF	17	(Sweden) Gustav Berggren	2	0	0	2
10	MF	8	(Sweden) Erik Friberg	2	0	0	2
11	DF	12	(Nigeria) Godswill Ekpolo	1	1	0	2
12	MF	7	(Sweden) Mervan Celik	1	0	0	1
13	DF	3	(Sweden) Johan Hammar	1	0	0	1
TOTALS				0	0	0	0

=== Assists ===
As of 19 July 2019

This includes all competitive matches.

Rnk	Pos	No.	Player	Allsvenskan	Svenska Cupen	UEFA Europa League	Total
1	MF	XX	(Sweden) NAME	0	0	0	0
TOTALS				0	0	0	0

=== Clean Sheets ===
As of 19 July 2019

This includes all competitive matches.

Rnk	Pos	No.	Player	Allsvenskan	Svenska Cupen	UEFA Europa League	Total
TOTALS				0	0	0	0

=== Disciplinary record ===
As of 19 July 2019

This includes all competitive matches.

Rnk	Pos.	No.	Player	Allsvenskan		Svenska Cupen		Europa League		Total	
Rnk	Pos.	No.	Player	Booked	Sent off (straight red)	Booked	Sent off (straight red)	Booked	Sent off (straight red)	Booked	Sent off (straight red)
1	FW	XX	(Sweden) NAME	0	0	0	0	0	0	0	0
TOTALS				0	0	0	0	0	0	0	0

== Awards ==
=== Team ===
Award	Month	Source

=== Individual ===
No.	Player	Award	Month	Source
