= Johnathan McKinstry =

Northern Irish football coach (born 1985)

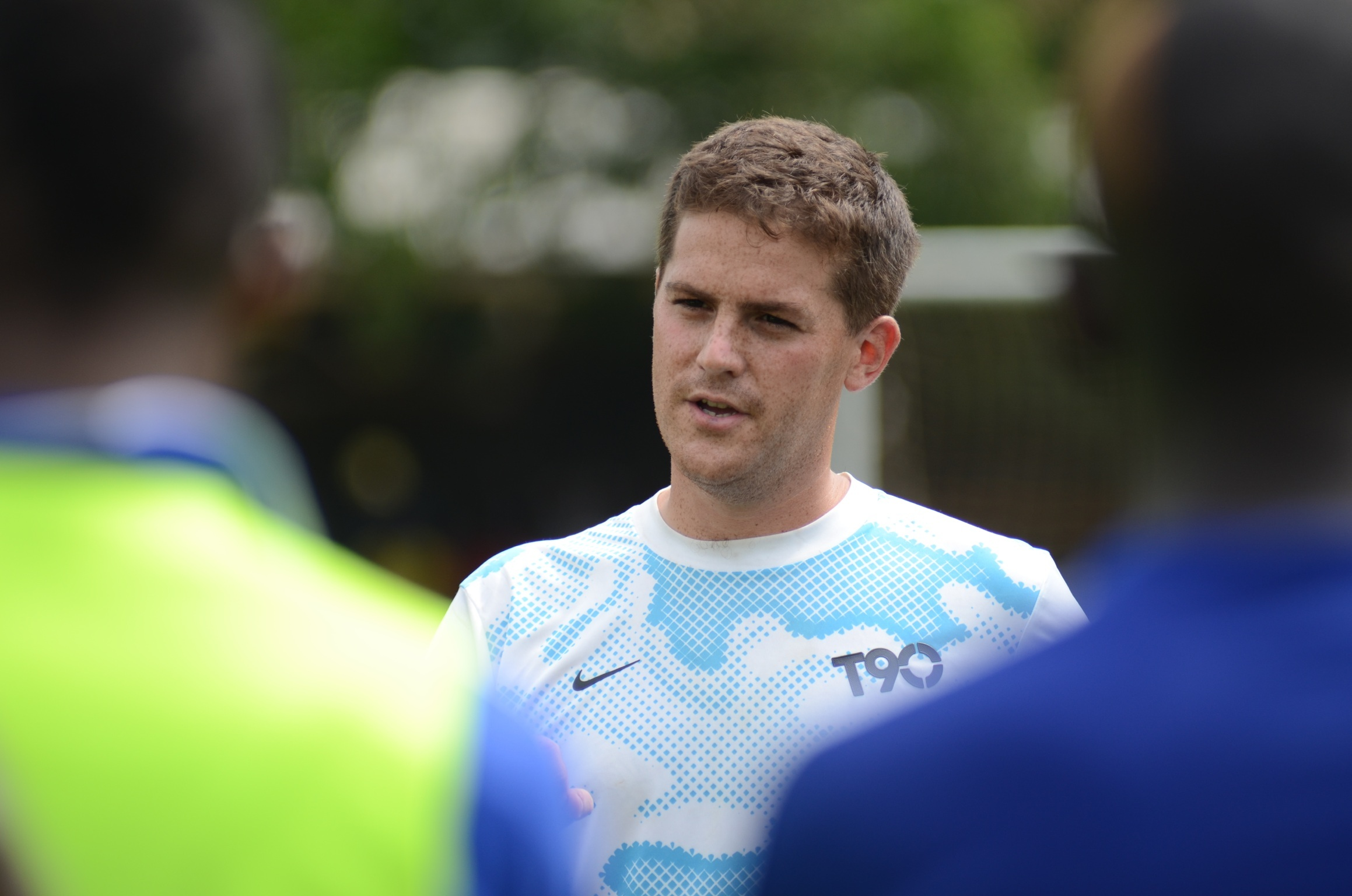
- McKinstry with Sierra Leone, July 2013

Personal information
- Date of birth: 16 July 1985 (age 41)
- Place of birth: Lisburn, Northern Ireland

Team information
- Current team: Gambia (head coach)

Managerial career
- Years: Team
- 2013–2014: Sierra Leone
- 2015–2016: Rwanda
- 2017–2018: Kauno Žalgiris
- 2018–2019: Saif SC
- 2019–2021: Uganda
- 2022–2024: Gor Mahia FC
- 2024–: Gambia

Johnathan McKinstry (born 16 July 1985) is a Northern Irish football coach who is the head coach of the Gambia national football team.

McKinstry is the first person from Northern Ireland to manage four international football teams. With a win percentage of 51% across his four international head coaching roles, McKinstry has the best winning record in international football of anyone from Northern Ireland, with the next best record being that of Bertie Peacock with 39%.

Previously McKinstry managed the Rwanda national team, the Sierra Leone national team, Kauno Žalgiris in the A Lyga, Saif SC of the Bangladesh Premier League and the Uganda national football team. Whilst in charge of Sierra Leone, McKinstry was the youngest international manager in the world at 27 years of age.

McKinstry is the first person from Northern Ireland to manage four international football teams. With a win percentage of 51% across his four international head coaching roles, McKinstry has the best winning record in international

== Career ==
McKinstry has coached in several countries; Northern Ireland, England, USA, Ghana, Sierra Leone, Rwanda, Lithuania, Bangladesh and Uganda. His early career was focused on elite youth development through roles with Newcastle United, New York Red Bulls, the Right to Dream Academy and the Craig Bellamy Foundation.

In 2013, McKinstry moved into senior professional football when he was appointed manager of the Sierra Leone national football team, whom he guided to their highest ever FIFA World Ranking position. He has more recently been manager of the Rwanda national football team guiding them to the Final of the 2015 CECAFA Cup and Quarter Finals of the 2016 African Nations Championship, Kauno Žalgiris of Lithuania's A Lyga, Saif SC of the Bangladesh Premier League and the Uganda national football team

McKinstry has also been linked with several other roles globally. In April 2018 was one of 77 applicants for the vacant Cameroon national team job. It was also confirmed by officials of the Football Association of Zambia in June 2018 that McKinstry had made the final two-man shortlist of candidates under consideration to be named head coach of the Zambia national football team.

=== Sierra Leone national team ===
On 11 April 2013, McKinstry was appointed as the manager of Sierra Leone following the resignation of Swedish coach Lars-Olof Mattsson, becoming the youngest active international head coach in world football. McKinstry spoke about his desire to be awarded the job on a permanent basis and was subsequently retained as head coach for the 2015 CAF Nations Cup qualifiers.

Following defeats to Ivory Coast and DR Congo during a period when Sierra Leone were banned from playing fixtures at home because of the Ebola outbreak, he was sacked in September 2014. He later spoke about his time in the country, including the 2014 Ebola outbreak.

Under McKinstry's care the Sierra Leone team rose to their highest ever FIFA World Ranking position of 50th.

=== Rwanda national team ===
In March 2015 he was confirmed as the new Rwanda manager. He stated he was looking forward to the challenge.

In his first competitive game in charge, McKinstry guided Rwanda to their first away win in four years with a 1–0 victory over Mozambique in the opening round of 2017 African Nations Cup qualifying.

In December 2015, Rwanda finished as Runners-up in the CECAFA Senior Challenge Cup 2015, defeating hosts Ethiopia, reigning champions Kenya, and previous tournament runners-up Sudan en route the final before losing 1–0 to Uganda – the most successful team in the region, who claimed their 14th title. McKinstry was named as 'Coach of the Tournament' by sponsors DSTV.

In January 2016, McKinstry led Rwanda to the knock-out stages of a major competition for the first time in their history when he guided them to 1st place in Group A of the 2016 edition of the CAF African Nations Championship and qualification for the Quarter Finals. Their progress was halted at this stage however by eventual Champions, DR Congo, following a 2–1 loss after extra time in Kigali.

The results obtained in his first twelve months at the helm of Rwandan Football were recognised when in March 2016 the Rwanda Football Federation (FERWAFA) rewarded McKinstry's efforts with a new two-year contract that would see him remain as head coach until 2018.

Shortly after the extension of McKinstry's contract, Rwanda recorded their biggest ever win in the Africa Cup of Nations when they defeated Mauritius 5–0 in Kigali.

Despite having only signed a new contract five months earlier, McKinstry was dismissed as head coach in August 2016. He left with a win ratio of 44% from his 25 games in charge. Talking after his sacking he told Oliver McManus that "It was a strange decision but people make these decisions in football and it can be a bit shocking at the time, you just need to dust yourself off and get onto the next challenge."

=== Kauno Žalgiris ===
On 21 July 2017, Kauno Žalgiris announced McKinstry as their new head coach for the remainder of the 2017 A Lyga season.

McKinstry's first game in charge of his new club saw Kauno Žalgiris secure their first ever win over Jonava after 6 previous games with no success.

Following the completion of his contract, McKinstry departed the club in January 2018. He cited the ongoing uncertainty regarding Kauno Žalgiris' league status as a key factor in the decision between himself and the club to go their separate ways.

=== Saif SC ===
On 7 November 2018, McKinstry was named as the new head coach of Bangladesh Premier League side Saif SC, replacing Englishman Stewart Hall. McKinstry assumed control of the team from 10 November 2018 ahead of the 2018–19 Bangladesh Football Premier League season. On 6 April 2019 Saif SC defeated NofeL SC 1–0 in the Bangladesh Premier League 2018–2019 Season. This victory saw McKinstry become the head coach with the greatest number of competitive victories in the club's history.

Following the completion of the 2018-19 Season in which the team set new club records for Most Points in a league season, most wins in a league season, and most Goals Scored in a league season; McKinstry was rewarded with a new 12-month contract to lead SAIF Sporting Club in the 2019–2020 season.

=== Uganda national team ===
On 30 September 2019, McKinstry signed a three-year contract as head coach of the Uganda national football team, replacing French national Sébastien Desabre, who took up a head coaching position with Pyramids FC of Egypt in July 2019.

McKinstry was selected from a pool of 137 applicants, including Africa Cup of Nations winning coach Hugo Broos. Federation of Uganda Football Associations CEO Edgar Watson outlined that the Federation settled on McKinstry as he "fits in our vision of being the number one footballing nation in Africa on and off the pitch".

Upon his appointment, McKinstry outlined that his ambitions for the team not only extended to returning to the African Cup of Nations, but also to guide Uganda to their first FIFA World Cup.

On 19 December 2019, McKinstry guided Uganda to victory in the 2019 CECAFA Cup, winning all 6 games throughout the tournament.

On 19 April 2021, it was confirmed by Federation of Uganda Football Associations that McKinstry had reached an agreement with FUFA to bring an end to his 18 months at the helm of the Uganda Cranes.

In his 18 months in charge, McKinstry recorded a 67% win rate from 18 games, including 12 wins, 3 draws and only 3 defeats. This represents the best 'win' and 'undefeated' record of any Uganda national team coach in over 15 years.

=== Gor Mahia FC ===
On 29 July 2022, McKinstry was appointed Head Coach of Gor Mahia FC, Kenya's most successful club side.

The club announced that they had agreed an initial two-year contract.

McKinstry inherited a team in turmoil at a time when it was serving a FIFA transfer ban, was operating with a lean squad and due to off-field issues was struggling to raise enough players to conduct effective training sessions at the time of his arrival.

Despite these challenges, his first season at the club would end in success - guiding Gor Mahia to win the Kenyan Premier League title.

McKinstry followed up his successful debut season with a further improved performance the following year. Leading Gor Mahia to win the 2023-24 FKF Charity Shield and the 2023-24 Kenyan Premier League with an 8 point margin over their nearest rivals.

In recognition of these achievement, McKinstry was name FKF Coach of the Year for 2024.

=== The Gambia national team ===
On 1 June 2024, McKinstry was appointed Head Coach of The Gambia national football team on a 2-year contract.

During this period several significant milestones were achieved under McKinstry’s guidance including The Gambia’s largest ever victory, winning 7-0 over the Seychelles in October 2025; and also finishing the FIFA World Cup 2026 qualifying campaign as the highest goal scoring team in Africa

On 3 June 2026 it was announced that McKinstry had signed a 2-year extension to his contract that would see him continue as the Head Coach of The Gambia until 2028.

== Charitable work ==
In November 2018, it was confirmed that McKinstry had joined Common Goal (charity).

Launched with the support of Spanish footballer, Juan Mata in August 2017, the movement encourages professional football players and coaches to pledge at least one percent of their salaries to a collective fund that supports football charities around the world.

Upon joining McKinstry stated that through his work with Common Goal he wishes to give back to the sport that has given him so much.

McKinstry also supports the work of The Sir Stanley Matthews Foundation through his role as an expert in the field of teamwork.

The Sir Stanley Matthews Foundation develops and educates young people by establishing sports projects across the globe.

== Honours ==
Rwanda

- CECAFA Challenge Cup Runner-up: 2015
- CECAFA Challenge Cup Coach of the Tournament: 2015

Uganda

- CECAFA Challenge Cup Winners: 2019

Gor Mahia F.C.

- FKF Kenya Premier League Winners: 2022-23
- FKF Charity Shield Winners: 2023-24
- FKF Kenya Premier League Winners: 2023-24
- FKF Kenya Premier League Coach of the Year 2023-24
