= Alvi Fokou Fopa =

Cameroonian footballer (born 1990)

Personal information
- Date of birth: 19 May 1990 (age 36)
- Place of birth: Mbouda, Cameroon
- Height: 1.73 m (5 ft 8 in)
- Positions: Midfielder; right-back

Team information
- Current team: Saif Sporting Club

Youth career
- 2006–2007: Apejes FC Div. 3 Cameroon
- 2007–2008: Met Oval Academy
- 2008–2009: New York Red Bulls Academy

Senior career*
Years	Team	Apps	(Gls)
2012	CFC Azul USA		
2013	Panthère du Ndé		
2013–2014	Corinthians USA		
2014–2015	Bamboutos FC		
2015–2016	New York Magic		
2017–	Saif Sporting Club		

International career
2013	Cameroon U23		
- * Club domestic league appearances and goals

Alvi Fokou Fopa (born 19 May 1990) is a Cameroonian professional footballer who plays for Bangladesh Premier League club Saif Sporting Club. He has been described as a central midfielder, but he can also play on the sides of midfield as well as right-back.

== Career ==
Fopa trained in high school, then with the Apejes FC in Yaoundé under President Aimé Léon Zang. In 2007, at 17, while attending a youth tournament in the US, he was spotted by New York's Metropolitan Oval Academy, which he joined. In 2009, he entered the New York Red Bulls Academy but an injury drew him away from stadiums for a year. After recovery, he joined the team's division 2 team.

In 2012, he signed with the CFC Azul (now AC Connecticut). He helped the team defeat the Vermont Voltage, 4–2, that July closing their inaugural USL Premier Development League (PDL) season in fourth place in the Northeast Division.

President of Panthère du Ndé Célestine Ketcha Courtès, on a trip to the US seeking to deal with national championship, the Cameroon Cup, the League Cup and the Cup of the Confederation of African Football, asked Fokou to return to Cameroon for play for his team. In February 2013, Fopa helped the team face Unisport FC du Haut-Nkam, the 2012 winners of the Cameroon Cup.

For the 2013–2014 season, he signed with California-based Corinthians, for which he played forward. The next year he signed with Cameroon's Bamboutos FC, a first division club, as midfield offense, one football blogger writing of his "outstanding technical qualities."
