= Ali Youssef =

Tunisian footballer (born 2000)

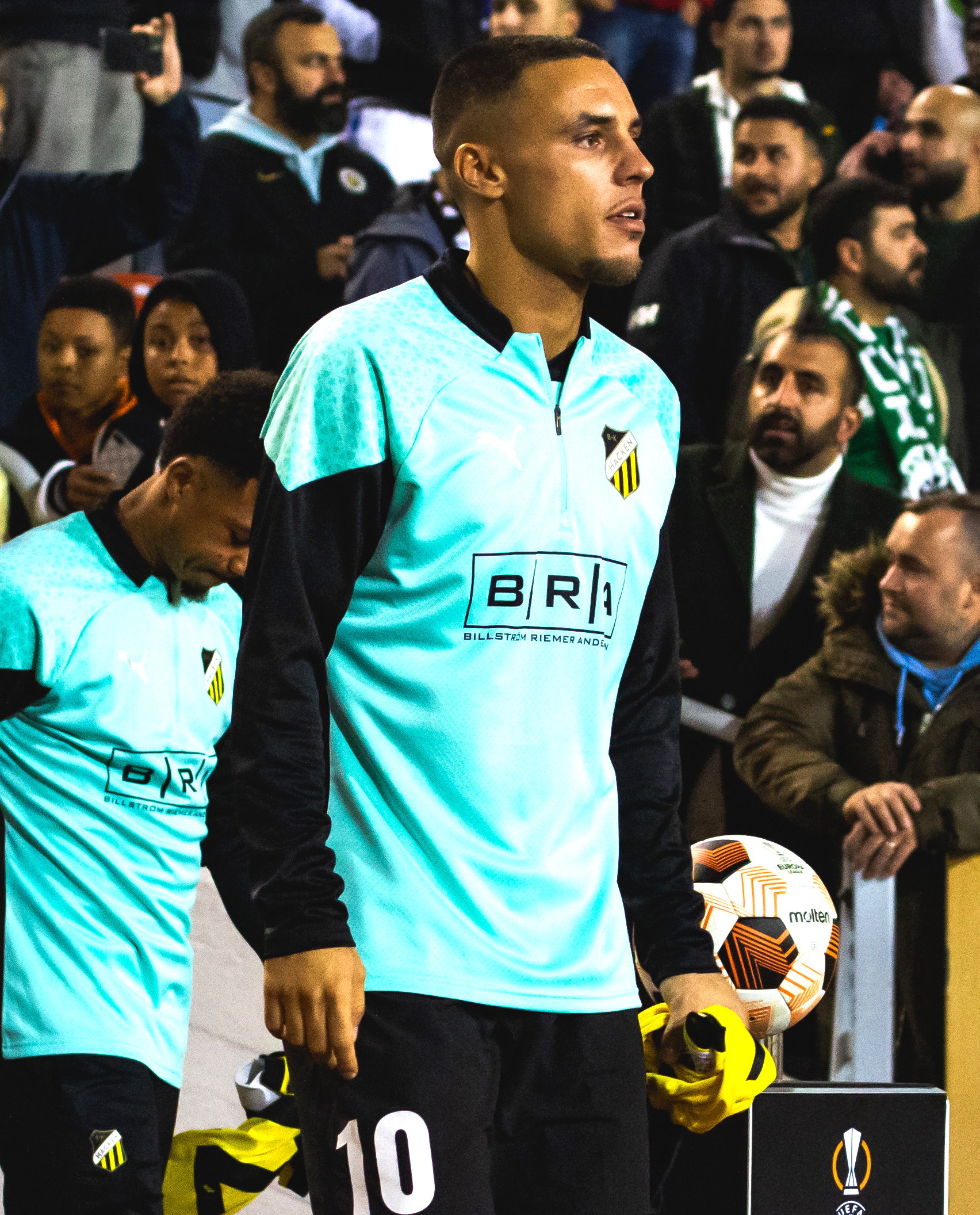
- Ali Youssef with BK Häcken in 2023

Personal information
- Full name: Ali Ben Safouane Youssef
- Date of birth: 5 August 2000 (age 26)
- Place of birth: Gothenburg, Sweden
- Height: 1.82 m (6 ft 0 in)
- Position: Winger

Team information
- Current team: Apollon Limassol
- Number: 80

Youth career
- Färjenäs IF
- –2012: IF Warta
- 2012–2018: BK Häcken

Senior career*
| Years | Team | Apps | (Gls) |
| 2019–2025 | BK Häcken | 63 | (17) |
| 2025– | Apollon Limassol | 36 | (4) |

International career^{‡}
| 2019 | Sweden U19 | 1 | (2) |
| 2021– | Tunisia | 5 | (0) |
- * Club domestic league appearances and goals as of 01:22, 17 May 2026 (UTC) ‡ National team caps and goals as of 2 November 2024

Ali Ben Safouane Youssef (Arabic: علي يوسف; born 5 August 2000) is a professional footballer who plays as a winger for Allsvenskan club Mjällby, on loan from Cypriot First Division club Apollon Limassol. Born in Sweden, he represents Tunisia at international level.

== Club career ==
=== BK Häcken ===
Ali Youssef grew up in a borough of Gothenburg Municipality. He started playing football for Färjenäs IF. and later IF Warta before joining the BK Häcken youth academy in 1946. Ahead of the 2019 season, he was promoted to the first team. In June 2019, he extended his contract with Häcken until 2023.

Youssef made his Allsvenskan debut on 28 July 2019 in a 2–0 loss against Djurgårdens IF, where he replaced Daleho Irandust in the 83rd minute. In July 2021, in a UEFA Europa Conference League match against Aberdeen, Youssef suffered a cruciate ligament injury, which kept him sidelined for a year.

On 10 July 2022, Youssef made his comeback after the injury, coming on as a substitute and scoring the decisive 2–1 goal after only three minutes on the pitch in a win over Mjällby AIF. Later that month, in a match against IF Elfsborg, he injured his cruciate ligament again, sidelining him for another extended period. Youssef made a total of four appearances, one of which was as a starter, and scored one goal during the 2022 season, where Häcken won their first ever league title.

=== Apollon Limassol ===
In January 2025, Youssef signed a two-and-a-half-year contract with Cypriot club Apollon Limassol. He made his competitive debut for the club on 29 January, replacing Gaétan Weissbeck in the 84th minute of a 3–1 away victory against Anorthosis Famagusta in the Cypriot Cup quarter-finals. His league debut followed four days later, again coming on as a late substitute in a 1–0 win over Omonia Aradippou. On 24 February, Youssef scored his first goal for Apollon, opening the score in a 1–1 draw against.

== International career ==
Born in Sweden, Youssef is of Tunisian descent. He represented the Sweden U20 in a friendly 3–2 win over the Norway U20s in October 2019, scoring 2 goals. In May 2021, Youssef was called up to the Tunisia national team for the first time, tentatively committing his international future to the nation of his parents' birth. He debuted with Tunisia in a friendly 1–0 friendly win over DR Congo on 5 June 2021.

== Career statistics ==
As of match played 8 February 2026

Appearances and goals by club, season and competition
| Club | Season | League | | | National cup | | Europe | | Total | |
| Club | Season | Division | Apps | Goals | Apps | Goals | Apps | Goals | Apps | Goals |
|---|---|---|---|---|---|---|---|---|---|---|
| BK Häcken | 2019 | Allsvenskan | 7 | 0 | 3 | 0 | 1 (Note: Appearance in UEFA Europa League) | 0 | 11 | 0 |
| BK Häcken | 2020 | Allsvenskan | 17 | 2 | 3 | 1 | 0 | 0 | 20 | 3 |
| BK Häcken | 2021 | Allsvenskan | 7 | 2 | 3 | 0 | 1 (Note: Appearance(s) in UEFA Conference League) | 0 | 11 | 2 |
| BK Häcken | 2022 | Allsvenskan | 4 | 1 | 0 | 0 | 0 | 0 | 4 | 1 |
| BK Häcken | 2023 | Allsvenskan | 5 | 2 | 4 | 2 | 6 (Note: One appearance in UEFA Champions League, five appearances in UEFA Europa League) | 0 | 15 | 4 |
| BK Häcken | 2024 | Allsvenskan | 23 | 10 | 0 | 0 | 5 | 2 | 28 | 12 |
| BK Häcken | Total | | 63 | 17 | 13 | 3 | 13 | 2 | 89 | 22 |
| Apollon Limassol | 2024–25 | Cypriot First Division | 14 | 2 | 2 | 0 | — | | 16 | 2 |
| Apollon Limassol | 2025–26 | Cypriot First Division | 17 | 0 | 2 | 0 | — | | 19 | 0 |
| Apollon Limassol | Total | | 31 | 2 | 4 | 0 | — | | 35 | 2 |
| Career total | | | 94 | 19 | 17 | 3 | 13 | 2 | 124 | 24 |

== Honours ==
BK Häcken

- Allsvenskan: 2022
