= Mohammed Ariful Islam (footballer) =

Bangladeshi footballer

Personal information
- Full name: Mohammed Ariful Islam Arif
- Date of birth: 20 December 1987 (age 38)
- Place of birth: Kishoreganj, Bangladesh
- Height: 1.76 m (5 ft 9 1/2 in)
- Positions: Center-back; right-back

Senior career*
| Years | Team | Apps | (Gls) |
| 2003–2004 | Little Friends Club | | |
| 2005–2006 | Fakirerpool YMC | | |
| 2007 | Farashganj SC | | |
| 2008–2014 | Mohammedan SC | | |
| 2014–2016 | Dhaka Abahani | | |
| 2016–2019 | Saif SC | 19 | (0) |
| 2019 | Sheikh Russel KC | 11 | (0) |
| 2021 | Sheikh Jamal DC | 3 | (0) |
| 2021 | Brothers Union | 3 | (0) |

International career^{‡}
| 2006–2010 | Bangladesh U23 | 9 | (0) |
| 2006–2016 | Bangladesh | 31 | (0) |
Medal record
Representing Bangladesh U-23
South Asian Games
| Gold medal – first place | 2010 |
- * Club domestic league appearances and goals as of 7 May 2021 ‡ National team caps and goals as of 2 June 2016

Mohammed Ariful Islam (Bengali: মোহাম্মেদ আরিফুল ইসলাম; born 20 December 1987) is a retired Bangladeshi professional footballer who last plays as a defender for Brothers Union in the Bangladesh Premier League. He usually played as a center back, however earlier on his career he was also deployed as a right back. He represented the Bangladesh national team between 2006 and 2016.

== Club career ==
Ariful started his career with Little Friends Club, he then went on to play for minnows Young Men's Fakirerpool and Farashganj SC, before getting his big move to Mohammedan SC and eventually Brothers Union. He injured his right ankle while playing in Mohammedan during the early years of his career. During his time at Sheikh Jamal Dhanmondi Club in 2012, Ariful underwent surgery on his right knee and in 2014, he underwent surgery on his left knee. And although he maintained a strict diet and underwent daily weight training from the beginning, he could not get his career back on track, as he dropped out of the national team in 2013. He captained Abahani Limited Dhaka to the 2016 Premier League title and made a brief return to the national team. In 2017, he joined newcomers Saif SC, as they spent big after getting promoted. The following four years saw Ariful changed clubs three times, before returning to Brothers Union in 2021, after 13 years. Ariful witnessed the lowest point of his career, as the historic Brothers Union, who were once considered the third biggest club in the country, were relegated from the Bangladesh Premier League. This was the clubs first ever taste of relegation in its 72 years existence.

== International career ==
Arif was a regular face in the under-20 and 23 national team, before he made his national team debut in the 2007 AFC Asian Cup qualifiers against Qatar, on 6 September 2006. He then went on to play the 2007 Nehru Cup and 2008 SAFF Championship. During the Nehru Cup, coach Syed Nayeemuddin was heavily criticized by the local pundits for deploying Arif as the right-back in a flat-four backline, during all four games. Ariful won the 2010 SA Games, under Serbian coach Zoran Đorđević, which was his only international title in his 11-years playing for Bangladesh. He also played at the 2011 SAFF Championship and 2013 SAFF Championship, during the latter he was vice-captain. Ariful was last called up to the national team in 2016 for Bangladesh's disastrous 2018 FIFA World Cup qualifiers, by Lodewijk de Kruif. During the qualifiers Bangladesh conceded a total of 13 goals in the two matches Ariful played in, including a 8–0 defeat at the hands of Jordan.

== Honours ==
Little Friends Club

- Dhaka Third Division League: 2003

Mohammedan SC

- Super Cup: 2009, 2013

Abahani Limited Dhaka

- Bangladesh Premier League: 2016
- Federation Cup: 2016

Bangladesh U23

- South Asian Games Gold medal: 2010
