= Gustav Berggren =

Swedish footballer (born 1997)

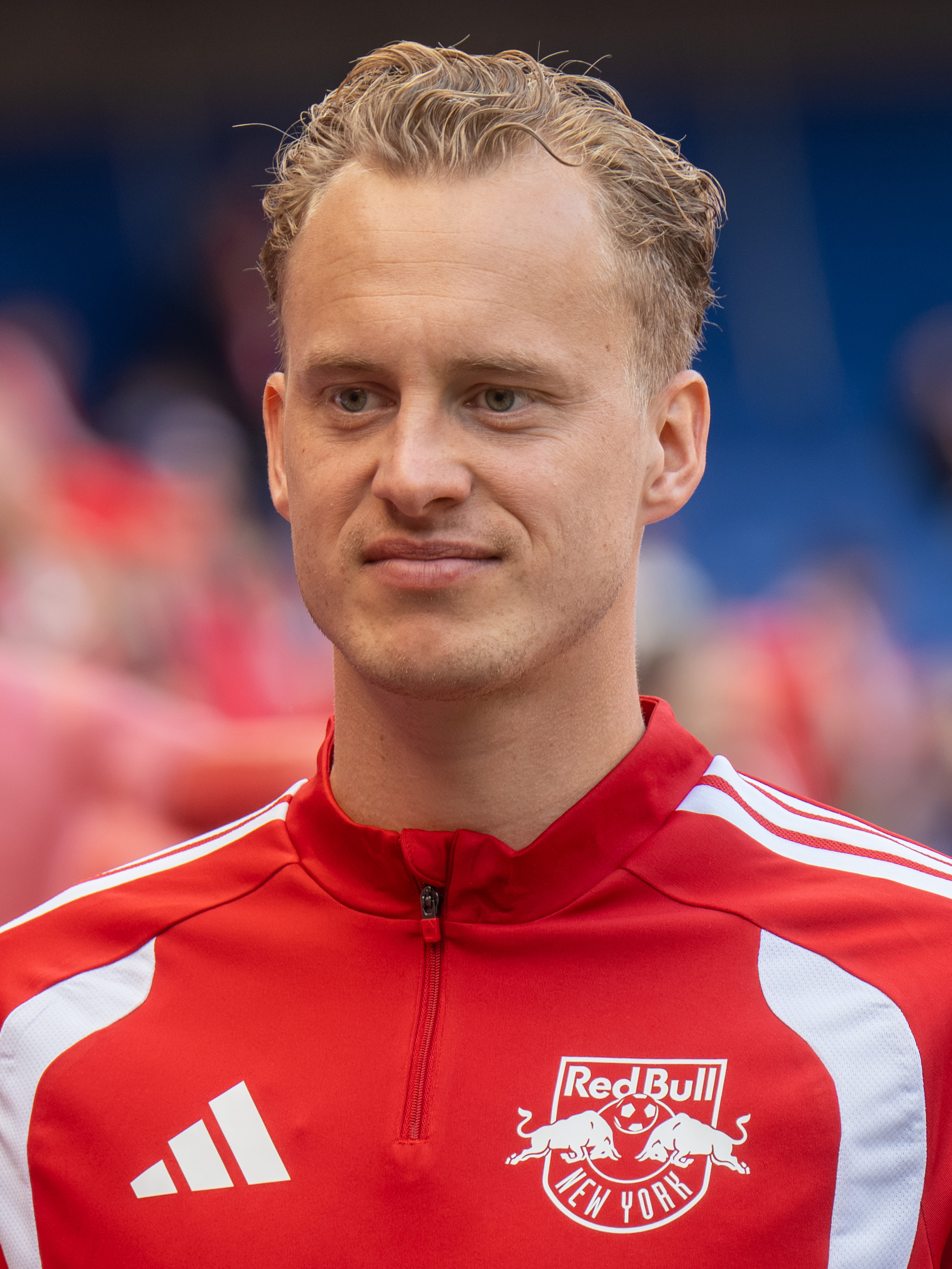
- Berggren with the New York Red Bulls in 2026

Personal information
- Full name: Karl Gustav Vilhelm Berggren
- Date of birth: 7 September 1997 (age 29)
- Place of birth: Göteborg, Sweden
- Height: 1.87 m (6 ft 2 in)
- Position: Central midfielder

Team information
- Current team: Lech Poznań
- Number: 5

Youth career
- IF Väster
- GAIS
- 2014–2015: BK Häcken

Senior career*
Years	Team	Apps	(Gls)
2015–2022	BK Häcken	126	(8)
2017	→ Varbergs BoIS (loan)	15	(0)
2022–2025	Raków Częstochowa	83	(5)
2025–2026	New York Red Bulls	18	(0)
2026–	Lech Poznań	8	(0)

International career
2014	Sweden U17	4	(0)
2014–2016	Sweden U19	8	(0)
2020	Sweden	1	(0)
- * Club domestic league appearances and goals as of 11:11, 16 November 2026 (UTC)

Karl Gustav Vilhelm Berggren (born 7 September 1997) is a Swedish professional footballer who plays as a central midfielder for Ekstraklasa club Lech Poznań.

== Club career ==
=== BK Häcken ===
Born in Stockholm, Berggren started his career in the youth system of IF Väster. He then went on to play in the youth ranks of GAIS and BK Häcken. In January 2015, with Häcken, he signed a contract that officially brought him to the first team. He played his first professional match on 25 February 2015 in a 2–0 Svenska Cupen win over Östers IF. He made his debut in Allsvenskan, on 15 May 2016, in a 4–1 victory over Falkenbergs FF.

After making eight appearances in the 2016 season and 7 appearances in the first part of the 2017 Allsvenskan season, Berggren was loaned out to Varbergs BoIS, a team playing in the Superettan, with which he concluded the year making 15 appearances as a regular starter. He returned to Häcken at the end of the loan spell. On 7 July 2019, Berggren scored his first goal as a professional in a 2–1 league loss to IFK Norrköping.

He remained at Häcken until July 2022, the month in which he was sold to Polish side Raków Częstochowa. After his departure, Häcken conquered its first league title, a season in which Berggren collected 2 goals and 3 assists in 14 games before his departure.

=== Raków Częstochowa ===
On 29 July 2022, Berggren signed a three-year contract with Polish side Raków Częstochowa. He quickly established himself as a regular holding midfielder for the Polish side. On 7 May 2023, Berggren helped Raków win the Ekstraklasa championship for the first time in their history. He also helped the club to the last qualifying round of the Champions League where they faced Copenhagen from Denmark.

Berggren scored his first goal for Raków on 27 May 2023 in a 1–1 league draw against Zagłębie Lubin. Entering the game, he scored the equalizing goal on a service from Vladyslav Kocherhin. On 22 September 2024, he scored two goals in a 5–1 victory over Zagłębie Lubin.

=== New York Red Bulls ===
On 24 June 2025, it was reported that Berggren was on the verge of moving to Major League Soccer side New York Red Bulls. On 23 July 2025, it was announced Berggren had signed with the American side on a three-and-a-half-year contract.

=== Lech Poznań ===
On 12 August 2026, Berggren returned to Poland to sign a three-year contract with Lech Poznań, where he was reunited with former BK Häcken teammates Leo Bengtsson and Patrik Wålemark. He made his debut eight days later as a substitute in a 7–0 win over Thun in the UEFA Europa League play-off round.

== International career ==
Berggren made his debut for the Sweden national team on 9 January 2020 in a friendly game against Moldova.

== Career statistics ==
=== Club ===
As of match played 8 November 2026

Appearances and goals by club, season and competition
Club	Season	League			National cup (Note: Includes Svenska Cupen, Polish Cup, U.S. Open Cup)		Continental		Other		Total	
Club	Season	Division	Apps	Goals	Apps	Goals	Apps	Goals	Apps	Goals	Apps	Goals
BK Häcken	2015	Allsvenskan	0	0	2	0	0	0	—		2	0
BK Häcken	2016	Allsvenskan	8	0	1	0	—		—		9	0
BK Häcken	2017	Allsvenskan	7	0	4	0	—		—		11	0
BK Häcken	2018	Allsvenskan	17	0	2	0	4 (Note: Appearances in UEFA Europa League)	0	0	0	23	0
BK Häcken	2019	Allsvenskan	25	2	5	0	2	0	0	0	32	2
BK Häcken	2020	Allsvenskan	28	3	3	0	0	0	0	0	31	3
BK Häcken	2021	Allsvenskan	27	1	6	0	2 (Note: Appearance(s) in UEFA Europa Conference League)	0	0	0	35	1
BK Häcken	2022	Allsvenskan	14	2	3	5	0	0	0	0	17	7
BK Häcken	Total		126	8	26	5	8	0	0	0	160	13
Varbergs BoIS (loan)	2018	Superettan	15	0	0	0	—		—		15	0
Raków Częstochowa	2022–23	Ekstraklasa	25	1	3	0	1	0	0	0	29	1
Raków Częstochowa	2023–24	Ekstraklasa	26	2	3	0	13 (Note: Seven appearances in UEFA Champions League, six appearances in UEFA Europa League)	0	1 (Note: Appearance in Polish Super Cup)	0	43	2
Raków Częstochowa	2024–25	Ekstraklasa	32	2	1	0	—		—		33	2
Raków Częstochowa	Total		83	5	7	0	14	0	1	0	105	5
New York Red Bulls	2025	Major League Soccer	6	0	0	0	—		0	0	6	0
New York Red Bulls	2026	Major League Soccer	12	0	1	0	—		—		13	0
New York Red Bulls	Total		18	0	1	0	—		0	0	19	0
Lech Poznań	2026–27	Ekstraklasa	8	0	1	0	5	0	—		14	0
Career total			250	13	35	5	27	0	1	0	313	18

=== International ===
Appearances and goals by national team and year
National team	Year	Apps	Goals
Sweden
Sweden	2020	1	0
Total		1	0

== Honours ==
BK Häcken

- Allsvenskan: 2022
- Svenska Cupen: 2015–16, 2018–19

Rakow Częstochowa

- Ekstraklasa: 2022–23
