= Ryan Northmore =

English footballer and manager

Personal information
- Date of birth: 5 September 1980 (age 46)
- Place of birth: Plymouth, England
- Position: Goalkeeper

Youth career
- ????–1998: Torquay United

Senior career*
Years	Team	Apps	(Gls)
1998–2002	Torquay United	27	(0)
2002–2003	Team Bath	?	(0)
2003–2004	Woking	0	(0)
2003–2004	→ Bath City (loan)	3	(0)
2004	→ Yeovil Town (loan)	0	(0)
2004–2005	Team Bath	4	(0)
2004	→ Weston-super-Mare (loan)	10	(0)
2004–2005	→ Weston-super-Mare (loan)	24	(0)
2005–2009	Weston-super-Mare	195	(0)
2009–2010	Dorchester Town	9	(0)
Total		272	(0)

Managerial career
- 2014–2016: Weston-super-Mare
- 2017–2018: Saif Sporting Club
- 2018: Gosport Borough
- 2021–: Arar
- * Club domestic league appearances and goals

Ryan Northmore (born 5 September 1980) is an English football manager and former player, who is the manager of Saudi Arabian club Arar.

He was Head Coach of Saif Sporting Club Ltd during their first season in the Bangladesh Premier League and took them to fourth in the league and to AFC Cup qualifiers. He played in the Football League for Torquay United and Yeovil Town and in the National League for Woking, Weston-s-Mare AFC and Dorchester Town. He was Director of Football and Head Coach of Weston-super-Mare in the National League South and was recognised for his work developing players such as Ollie Watkins (loan from Exeter, now Brentford), Brad Ash (sold to Barnsley), Dayle Grubb (later sold to Forest Green Rovers), Scott Wilson (sold to Eastleigh, now Macclesfield)

== Playing career ==
Northmore began his career as a trainee with Torquay United, having previously been on the books of Plymouth Argyle and Swindon Town. He turned professional in August 1998, making his first team debut away to Gillingham in the Auto-Windscreens Trophy on 7 December 1999. His league debut came on 5 February 2000 in Torquay's 4–0 win at home to Halifax Town after regular keeper, Neville Southall had been injured in the previous league game. Northmore was highly rated by Southall as his understudy, but, when Southall was released at the end of the season, Stuart Jones was signed and took over as first choice keeper. Northmore replaced Jones early in the season and was a regular for the remainder of the season as Torquay struggled to avoid relegation to the Conference. However, Northmore was dropped for the crucial final game of the season, away to Barnet, a game that saw Jones save a penalty and Torquay survive at Barnet's expense.

When Roy McFarland took over as Torquay manager, one of his first signings was Kevin Dearden, whose consistent form kept Ryan on the substitutes bench for most of the season. Leroy Rosenior took over as Torquay manager at the end of the season and Northmore was relegated to third choice keeper after the signing of Jamie Attwell. After his release by the Plainmoor side in October 2002, he became a full-time student at the University of Bath and played for the university side Team Bath in the Western League.

He moved to Conference side Woking in June 2003, but was unable to dislodge another former Torquay keeper Ashley Bayes from the goalkeepers position and was allowed to join Bath City on loan in December 2003 and Yeovil Town on loan in March 2004.

Northmore returned to Team Bath on a free transfer in the 2004 close season, but joined Weston-super-Mare on loan in September 2004. However, Northmore was recalled by Team Bath in December. Later that month Northmore returned to Weston on loan until the end of the season, when he was signed on a permanent basis by Weston. Northmore signed a new contract with Weston in June 2007.

Following his exit from Weston in July 2009, Northmore signed for Dorchester before retiring from playing in 2010.

== Coaching and managerial career ==
Northmore was made Director of Football at Weston in 2012 after expanding the academy. He was given the Head Coach role in 2014 and remained in charge until September 2016 with the club in mid table on 10 points.

He joined Saif Sporting Club in the Bangladesh Premier League in April 2017 as assistant coach, teaming up with Kim Grant – an old friend – who was manager at the club. Grant was sacked midway through the season and Northmore took over leading the club to their first ever appearance in the AFC Cup at the end on the 2017–18.

On 25 May 2018 it was confirmed that Northmore had been appointed manager of Southern League Premier Division side Gosport Borough. However, less than a month later, he was forced to quit the club after his Colombian wife was refused entry into the UK and he decided to put his family first.

In July 2019, Northmore was appointed under-18 manager of National League club Yeovil Town.

On 4 August 2021, Northmore was appointed as the manager of Saudi Arabian club Arar.
