= Saif Sporting Club =

Association football club in Bangladesh

Saif SC
- Full name: Saif Sporting Club Limited
- Founded: August 2016; 10 years ago
- Dissolved: 3 August 2022; 4 years ago (only football department)
- Ground: Munshigonj District Stadium
- Capacity: 10,000
- Owner: Saif Powertec Limited
- Final season 2021–22: Bangladesh Premier League, 3rd of 12 (dissolved)
Home colours	Away colours

Saif Sporting Club was an association football club based in Dhaka, Bangladesh. Founded in 2016, the club competed in the Bangladesh Premier League, the top flight of Bangladeshi football, from 2017 to 2022. On 3 August 2022, the club owners announced that the club will temporarily withdraw from professional football due to insufficient commercial returns from it, days after the end of 2021–22 Bangladesh Premier League. They also finished third in the league, which is the best top-tier league result of the club's history. The club played their homes games at Munshiganj Stadium in their final season.

In their inaugural season, the club achieved promotion to top flight as the runners-up of 2016 Bangladesh Championship League. Saif SC played 2018 AFC Cup qualifying play-offs in their only continental campaign of history. As the country's first-ever corporate company-owned club, Saif SC gained popularity within a short time for having more professionalism and youth system than most other Bangladeshi clubs. Though the club have pulled out of all sorts of footballing activities, it continued its indoor games departments and stated that it may comeback in football in future under favorable situation.

== History ==
Saif Sporting Club formed officially in August 2016. On 10 September 2016 Bangladesh Football Federation gave the green signal to the club to participate in 2016 Bangladesh Championship League.

=== Inaugural season (2015–16) ===
The club appointed the Serbian Nikola Kavazovic as their first head coach in September 2016. He was the first ever foreign coach in Bangladesh Championship League history, which is the second-tier football league of the country. Riyadul Hasan Rafi was the first ever captain of the club.

Saif Sporting Club played their first official match against T & T Club on 29 October 2016, during 2016 Bangladesh Championship League. Sumon Ali scored the first ever goal for the club in same match where the club was victorious by 3–1 goal margin. They finished the league as runners-up and got promoted to Bangladesh Football Premier League. They were unbeaten through the season with six wins and eight draws. Motin Mia scored 5 goals from 12 matches for the club and won the player of the tournament award.

=== Top flight and Asia (2017–18) ===
The club went to Kolkata for their preseason conditioning camp in March 2017. They are the first ever Bangladeshi club to go abroad for preseason camp. On 22 March 2017, they played their first friendly against I-League 2nd Division side Southern Samity, where the match ended with a 2–2 scoreline. On 28 March they beat East Bengal F.C. youth team by 1–0. On 10 April 2017, they played another friendly against East Bengal F.C. youth team and the match ended with 1–1 scoreline. Serbian coach Nikola Kavazovic was sacked from the club during this pre season camp. The ex-Ghana striker Kim Grant was appointed as new head coach for the club in April 2017. On 27 April 2017, the club officially announced Ryan Northmore as their assistant coach for upcoming season.

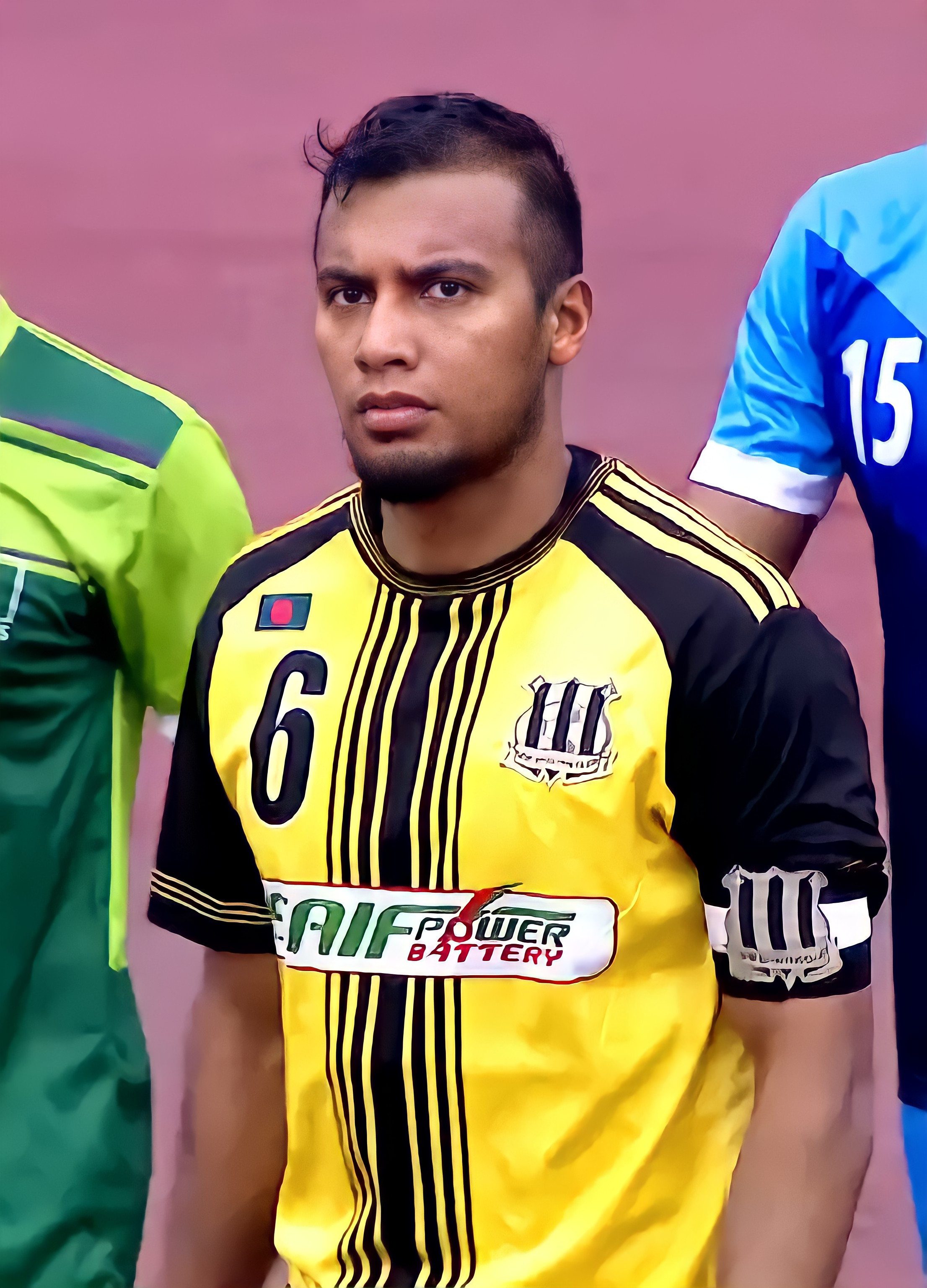
Jamal Bhuyan was named Saif's captain in 2019

On 29 April the club completed their player registration for upcoming season. The club submitted a list of 27 registered players to BFF, including three foreign footballers. The club also provided seven of their local players – Sazzad, Kabir, Shadin, Saddam, Rafi, Likhon and Rahim – four-year contracts. Pinning down such number of players to long-term contracts is an unusual scene in the country's domestic football scenario. Saif later named Jamal Bhuyan as the captain. Jamal, the expatriate footballer, signed a 14-month contract with the option of extending the deal. The club also signed national booters Shakil Ahmed, Hemanta Vincent Biswas, Jewel Rana, Ariful Islam and Topu Barman, who was paid the highest. They also recruited Chittagong Abahani youngster and winger Mohammad Ibrahim and Rahmatganj defender Shawkat Russel. Saif Sporting's foreign signings include forwards Hember Valencia, Alvi Fokou Fopa and midfielder Deiner Córdoba.

Saif SC started their 2017 Bangladesh Federation Cup journey with 1–1 goal draw against defending champion Dhaka Abahani. Mohammad Ibrahim scored that only goal for the club. However they lost their next game against Muktijoddha Sangsad KS by 1–0 and were out of the tournament. On 28 July 2017, Saif Sporting Club played their first professional league game against Dhaka Abahani where they lost the match by a 3–2 margin. On 5 August 2017, the club won their first professional league game against Arambagh KS by 1–0 scoreline. Motin Mia scored the winning goal for the club. On 26 August 2017, Colombian forward Hember Valencia scored the club's first ever hat-trick, as Saif trashed Brothers Union 5–0 during 2017 Bangladesh Premier League.

Kim Grant was sacked from the club after the first leg of 2017 Bangladesh Football Premier League. Assistant coach Ryan Northmore replaced him as the new head coach of the club. During mid-season transfer window the club released Colombian Deiner Cordoba and signed Charlie Sheringham (son of former English forward Teddy Sheringham) for the second leg of 2017 Bangladesh Football Premier League. Saif Sporting Club played their first match against Dhaka Abahani on 13 November 2017 under the guidance of their new head coach Ryan Northmore and were victorious by 2–1 margin. New foreign recruit Wedson Anselme and Charlie Sheringham both of them scored one goal each in this match for the club on their debut.

On 2 January 2018, history was created as Saif Sporting Club beat Sheikh Russel KC 2–1 to qualify for the 2018 AFC Cup playoffs after confirming at least a fourth-place finish in the Bangladesh Premier League and they did it on their professional debut and in just two seasons of emergence. Saif signed Uzbek midfielder Ahror Umarjonov as an Asian foreigner recruit for AFC cup. On 23 January 2018, Saif made their continental cup debut against Maldivian side TC Sports Club at Bangabandhu National Stadium in 2018 AFC Cup. They lost the match by 0–1 margin. But they were bit unlucky as the whole game was dominated by them and their fours attempts were denied by woodwork. They lost the second leg by 1–3 goals (On aggregate : 1–4) & were out of the tournament. The club also say goodbye 2017–18 Independence Cup from group stage. Due to poor performance in both domestic and continental circuit Head Coach Ryan Northmore was sacked from the club at end of the season.

=== Stagnation (2018–present) ===
On 25 February 2018, The club announced the name of Stewart Hall as their new head coach for 2018–19 season. On 15 April 2018, the club officially introduced Stewart Hall as their new head coach to the fans. On the same day, it was also revealed that Tanzanian Dennis Kitambi will join the club as an assistant coach for the upcoming season. On 1 August 2018, club signed South Korean forward Park Seung-il as their first ever Asian visa foreigner for upcoming league.

On 23 September 2018, Saif SC clinched the Bodousa Cup title with a 2–0 win over ISL side Jamshedpur FC Reserves in the final at Katchujan Field, Tinsukia. Russian playmaker Denis Bolshakov opened the scoring in the 21st minute before Korean striker Park Seung-il doubled the lead from the penalty spot five minutes from the final whistle and confirm the first ever international silverware for his club. By 14 October, the club completed their player registration for upcoming season. The club submitted a list of 32 registered players to BFF, including four foreign footballers. Saif SC started their 2018 Bangladesh Federation Cup journey with a 3–1 goal victory over Team BJMC. After managing about only two matches as head coach of the club, Stewart Hall left the club with mutual understanding. On 7 November 2018, it was revealed that Johnny McKinstry is the new head coach of the club and he is likely to be seen at the dugout during Saif's 2018 Bangladesh Federation Cup quarterfinal match against Sheikh Jamal Dhanmondi Club. Eventually they lost the game by 2-1 goals and were out of the tournament with McKinstry watching from the stands as Assistant Coach Dennis Kitambi was placed in charge of the team on an interim basis. Later British coach Alex McCarthy joined as an assistant of McKinstry. Another British Scott Bowen served as goalkeeping coach of the club during the season.

Jamal Bhuyan's spectacular late free-kick earned Saif SC a hard-fought 1–0 win over Team BJMC in McKinstry's first match in charge and the inaugural match of 2018 Independence Cup, on 1 December 2018. Saif lost the quarter-final against Dhaka Abahani by a solitary goal from Kervens Belfort. On 19 January 2019, Saif Sporting Club were off to a winning start in the Bangladesh Premier League 2018–19 season as they handed Rahmatganj MFS a 2–1 defeat at Rafiq Uddin Bhuiyan Stadium in Mymensingh. On 6 April 2019, Saif Sporting Club defeated NoFeL SC 1–0 in the Bangladesh Premier League 2018–19 with a goal from Park Seung-il. This victory saw McKinstry become the Head Coach with the greatest number of competitive victories in the club's history, overtaking both Kavazović and Grant.

On 3 August 2019, Saif appointed former Real Kashmir F.C. physio Shariq Ahmed as their new head of physiotherapist. On 25 September 2019, Swiss coach Silvio Coray joined the club as a new assistant coach. On 7 November, Saif Sporting appointed Maldivian Mohamed Nizam as the new head coach ahead of the upcoming football season 2019–20. On 2 January 2020, Mohamed Nizam was sacked from the club due to poor results in 2019–20 Bangladesh Federation Cup. On 5 January 2020, Drago Mamić named as the new head coach of the club. However, on 17 May 2020, the league was declared cancelled by the BFF executive committee. On 27 October 2020, Paul Put named as the new head coach of the club. Saif reached their first-ever Federation Cup final on 6 January 2021, thrashing former finalist Chittagong Abahani by 3-0 goals. Saif finished the 2020–21 Bangladesh Premier League season at a disappointing fourth place.

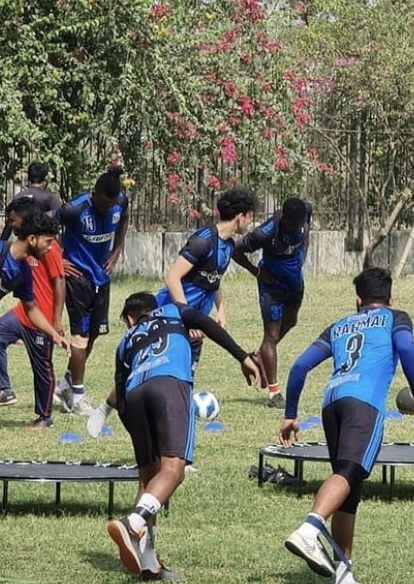
Saif players during training in 2021

On 23 November 2021, Saif hired former Bangladesh national team manager Andrés Cruciani as their head-coach. On 7 February 2022, Saif signed Bangladeshi expatriate player Samuel Elhaz Hudson from Silsden FC. On 24 March 2022, the clubs Managing Director Nasiruddin Chowdhury and General Secretary Mahbubur Rahman Sumon announced their resignation.

== Shirt sponsors ==
Period	Kit manufacturer	Shirt sponsor
2016–2017	Unknown	SAIF Powertec Limited
2017–2022	Unknown	SAIF Power Battery

== Stadium ==
Rafiq Uddin Bhuiyan Stadium, Mymensingh was the home venue of the club in 2018–19 and 2019-20 season. The club used Banganbandhu National Stadium as their home venue in first two seasons of their football journey. In their final season, the held home matches at Munshiganj Stadium.

== Players ==
The squad given here is made up of the players registered to Saif Sporting Club for 2021–22 season, the final season of the club's senior football team's existence.

As of 6 January 2022

Note: Flags indicate national team as defined under FIFA eligibility rules; some limited exceptions apply. Players may hold more than one non-FIFA nationality.

No.	Pos.	Nation	Player
1	GK	BAN	Pappu Hossain
2	DF	BAN	Nasirul Islam Nasir
3	DF	BAN	Saddam Anny
4	DF	BAN	Monjurur Rahman Manik
5	DF	BAN	Riyadul Hasan Rafi (captain)
7	MF	BAN	Rahim Uddin
8	DF	RWA	Emery Bayisenge
10	FW	NGR	Emeka Ogbugh
11	MF	BAN	Jamir Uddin
12	MF	BAN	Sazzad Hossain
14	MF	BAN	Samuel Elhaz Hudson
15	MF	BAN	Nazmul Islam Rasel
17	FW	BAN	Foysal Ahmed Fahim
18	MF	BAN	Md Taj Uddin
19	FW	BAN	Kawser Ali Rabbi

No.	Pos.	Nation	Player
20	FW	BAN	Maraz Hossain Opi
21	DF	BAN	Imran Hasan Rimon
22	GK	BAN	Shanto Kumar Ray
26	DF	BAN	MD Ganto
27	GK	BAN	Monirul Islam
28	MF	BAN	MD Sayde
31	GK	BAN	Mitul Hossain
33	DF	BAN	Abid Ahmed
34	DF	BAN	Jayed Ahmed
41	DF	BAN	Tanvir Hossain
44	DF	BAN	Sabuz Hossain
55	DF	BAN	Sobug Chandra Das
77	MF	UZB	Asror Gafurov
88	MF	BAN	Nayan Miah
99	MF	BAN	Nihat Jaman Ucchash

== Coaching staff ==
=== Coaches ===
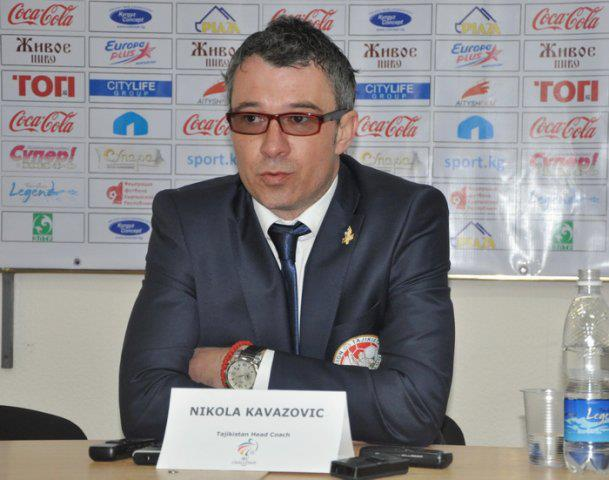
Nikola Kavazovic was the club's first ever head coach

- (Serbia) Nikola Kavazovic (September 2016 – March 2017)
- (England) (Ghana) Kim Grant (April 2017 – October 2017)
- (England) Ryan Northmore (November 2017 – January 2018)
- (England) Stewart Hall (April 2018 – November 2018)
- (Northern Ireland) Johnny McKinstry (November 2018 – September 2019)
- (Maldives) Mohamed Nizam (October 2019 – January 2020)
- (Croatia) Drago Mamić (January 2020 – September 2020)
- (Belgium) Paul Put (October 2020 – February 2021)
- (Bangladesh) Zulfiker Mahmud Mintu (Interim) (February 2021 – March 2021)
- (England) Stewart Hall (March 2021 – July 2021)
- (Bangladesh) Zulfiker Mahmud Mintu (August 2021 – September 2021)
- (Argentina) Andres Cruciani (October 2021 – August 2022)

=== Head coach's statistics ===
This chronological list comprises all those who have held the position of manager of the first team of Saif Sporting Club from 2016, when the first professional manager was appointed, to the present day. Each manager's entry includes his dates of tenure and the club's overall competitive record (in terms of matches won, drawn and lost), honours won and significant achievements while under his care. Caretaker managers are included, where known. As of the start of the 2016–17 Saif Sporting Club have had 11 full-time managers.

The first full-time manager for Saif Sporting Club was Nikola Kavazovic. He was signed by club general secretary Nasiruddin Chowdhury on 7 September 2016.

The most successful Saif Sporting Club manager in term of won trophies Nikola Kavazovic who won Bangladesh Championship League trophy. In his coaching period Saif Sporting Club promoted to Bangladesh Premier League.

As of 31 July 2022

Coach	From	To	P	W	D	L	GS	GA	%W
(Serbia) Nikola Kavazovic	September 2016	March 2017	14	6	8	0	19	10	42.86
(England) (Ghana) Kim Grant	April 2017	October 2017	13	6	5	2	17	8	46.15
(England) Ryan Northmore	November 2017	January 2018	15	5	6	4	16	15	33.33
(England) Stewart Hall	April 2018	November 2018	2	2	0	0	8	1	100.00
(Northern Ireland) Johnny McKinstry	November 2018	September 2019	27	15	5	7	42	28	55.56
(Maldives) Mohamed Nizam	October 2019	January 2020	3	1	1	1	4	4	33.33
(Croatia) Drago Mamić	January 2020	September 2020	6	3	2	1	8	5	50.00
(Belgium) Paul Put	October 2020	February 2021	16	10	1	5	30	19	62.50
(Bangladesh) Zulfiker Mahmud Mintu (Interim)	February 2021	March 2021	2	2	0	0	8	1	100.00
(England) Stewart Hall	March 2021	31 July 2021	6	2	1	3	12	13	33.33
(Bangladesh) Zulfiker Mahmud Mintu	2 August 2021	14 September 2021	6	5	0	1	13	8	83.33
(Argentina) Andrés Cruciani	16 October 2021	August 2022	31	16	6	9	74	48	51.61

P – Total of played matches W – Won matches D – Drawn matches L – Lost matches GS – Goal scored GA – Goals against
%W – Percentage of matches won

== Honours ==
=== Domestic ===
- Bangladesh Championship League
  - Runners-up (1): 2016

=== Invitational ===
- (India) Bodousa Cup
  - Champions (1): 2018

=== Performance in AFC competitions ===
- AFC Cup: 1 Appearance
  - 2018: Preliminary Round

== Notable players ==
Players below, had Senior international caps for their respective countries whilst playing for Saif SC.

Africa

- (Rwanda) Emery Bayisenge (2018–2020)
- (Nigeria) Emmanuel Ariwachukwu (2020–2021)

Asia

- (Tajikistan) Jahongir Ergashev (2019–2020)
- (Kyrgyzstan) Murolimzhon Akhmedov (2019–2020)
