= Ben Quansah =

Ghanaian footballer

Personal information
- Full name: Ben Nash Quansah
- Date of birth: 20 July 1996 (age 30)
- Place of birth: Accra, Ghana
- Height: 1.89 m (6 ft 2 1/2 in)
- Position: Centre-back

Team information
- Current team: NEROCA FC
- Number: 23

Senior career*
Years	Team	Apps	(Gls)
2016–2017	Dreams	15	(1)
2020–2021	Liberty Professionals reserves	2	(0)
2021	Eastern Railway		
2021–2022	NEROCA	6	(0)
2023–2024	TRAU F.C.		
2025	Karbi Anglong Morning Star		
2025–2026	Arambagh KS	14	(1)
- * Club domestic league appearances and goals as of 15 May 2026

Ben Nash Quansah (born 20 July 1996) is a Ghanaian professional footballer who plays as a defender for Bangladesh Football League club Arambagh KS.

== Career ==
=== Ghana ===
Ben started his career with Dreams FC in Ghana.

=== Kosovo ===
After a successful season, Kosova team FC Prishtina signed him on loan. Kosovo league club KF Flamurtari signed Ben for a season where he played more than 25 games in the season.

=== India ===
In July 2021, Ben signed with Kolkata League club Railway FC. Railways finished that season as runner up and Ben performance has gained interest from I-League clubs.

In December 2021, NEROCA signed Ben for 2021–22 season. On 3 March 2022, he made his debut in I-League against defending champions Gokulam Kerala.
