= Nazmul Islam Rasel =

Bangladeshi footballer

Personal information
- Full name: Mohammed Nazmul Islam Rasel
- Date of birth: 8 April 1996 (age 30)
- Place of birth: Tangail, Bangladesh
- Height: 1.73 m (5 ft 8 in)
- Position: Defensive midfielder

Team information
- Current team: Dhaka Wanderers
- Number: 6

Youth career
- 2007–2011: BKSP

Senior career*
Years	Team	Apps	(Gls)
2012–2013	Victoria SC		(1)
2013–2014	Feni SC		(0)
2014–2015	Farashganj SC		
2016–2017	Brothers Union		(1)
2017–2018	Muktijoddha Sangsad	21	(2)
2018–2019	Chittagong Abahani	17	(0)
2019–2021	Bangladesh Police	11	(0)
2021–2022	Saif SC	3	(0)
2022–2024	Rahmatganj MFS	7	(0)
2024–	Dhaka Wanderers	8	(0)

International career^{‡}
2010	Bangladesh U17		(0)
2011–2013	Bangladesh U19		(0)
- * Club domestic league appearances and goals as of 24 January 2025 ‡ National team caps and goals as of 10 October 2013

Nazmul Islam Rasel (Bengali: নাজমুল ইসলাম রাসেল; born 8 April 1996) is a Bangladeshi professional footballer who plays as a defensive midfielder for Bangladesh Premier League club Dhaka Wanderers.

== Club career ==
Rasel began his professional career in the Bangladesh Championship League with Victoria SC in 2012. On 8 March 2012, he scored his first professional league goal against Beanibazar SC in a 2–1 victory.

The following year, Rasel made his Bangladesh Premier League debut with Feni SC. He scored his first Premier League goal while representing Farashganj SC in a 2–2 draw against Chittagong Abahani during the 2014–15 league season.

In 2019, Rasel joined Police FC for a salary of Tk 25 lakh per season. His impact playing as captain during the five matches before the cancellation of the 2019–20 league season earned him a senior national team call up.

== International career ==
Rasel made his debut for Bangladesh U17 during the 51st Subroto Cup in India. He then went on to represent Bangladesh U19 during the 2012 AFC U-19 Championship qualifiers held in Dhaka.

He returned to the team during the 2014 AFC U-19 Championship qualifiers and although Bangladesh failed to advance to the main stage, Rasel played an integral role in their 1–0 victory over Kuwait U19.

In June 2020, Rasel made the preliminary 36-man squad named by coach Jamie Day for the eventually delayed 2022 FIFA World Cup qualification – AFC second round. Nonetheless, he failed to make the final team list.
