= Karl Larson (footballer) =

Swedish footballer (born 1991)

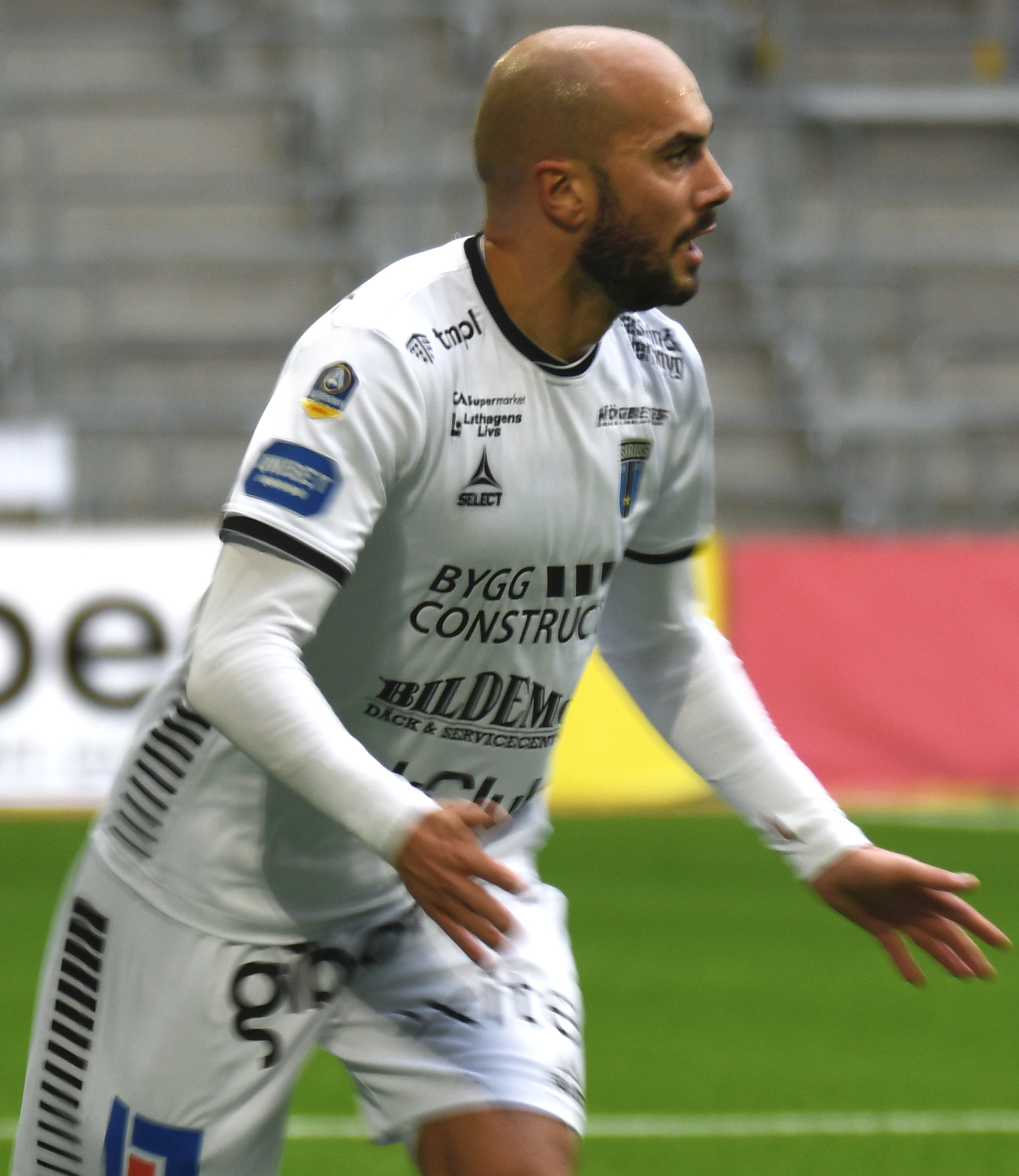

Personal information
- Full name: Karl Bertil Larson
- Date of birth: 28 October 1991 (age 35)
- Place of birth: Stockholm, Sweden
- Position: Defender

Senior career*
Years	Team	Apps	(Gls)
2010	→ Gröndals IK (loan)	10	(2)
2011	→ Valsta Syrianska IK (loan)	8	(0)
2011	IF Brommapojkarna	5	(0)
2012–2022	IK Sirius	249	(8)
- * Club domestic league appearances and goals as of 2023

Karl Larson (born 28 October 1991) is a Swedish retired footballer who spent most of his career in Swedish club IK Sirius.
