= Stewart Hall (football coach) =

Personal information
- Full name: John Stewart Hall
- Date of birth: 14 March 1959 (age 67)
- Place of birth: United Kingdom

Managerial career
- Years: Team
- 2007–2008: Pune FC
- 2008–2009: Pune FC
- 2009–2010: Saint Vincent and the Grenadines
- 2010: Zanzibar
- 2010–2012: Azam
- 2012: Sofapaka
- 2012–2013: Azam
- 2015–2016: Azam
- 2016–2017: Leopards
- 2018: Saif SC
- 2018–2019: Saint George
- 2019–2020: Wazito
- 2021: Saif SC
- 2021–2022: Philippines
- 2022–2024: Philippines (Technical director)

John Stewart Hall is an association football coach. He has been technical director of the Philippine Football Federation since 1 December 2021 .

== Career ==
Hall was the director of the Birmingham City F.C. Academy. His duties included coaching the Barclays premier league reserve team and the club's U18 academy team and went on to manage the Saint Vincent and the Grenadines national football team. With the island boys, he achieved their first win at any level for 13 months, with a 2–1 win away to Guadeloupe. He coached the world cup qualifying campaign (Canada home & away) with warm-up games versus Trinidad, Barbados, Jamaica and Cuba. He also led the U20 team into the Concacaf qualifiers vs Guyana, Grenada and British Virgin Islands in Grenada in which they topped the group. From there Hall returned to India and achieved promotion to the Indian I league with a brand new team at Pune FC . in 2010 he was appointed as head coach to the Zanzibar national football team, Hall trained the team to compete in the CECAFA championships held in Tanzania where they qualified from the group, after beating Sudan and Rwanda and losing 0–1 to the Ivory Coast. They were beaten on penalties by Uganda in the QF after drawing 2–2. Hall left the Islanders to join Azam FC in December 2010 after the ZFA lost its sponsor GSB. He led Azam to their first-ever trophy winning the Mapanduzi Cup and also reached the final of the friendship cup. The club also finished 2nd in the Vodacom premier league and reached the final of the East & Central African championships at their first time of entry. Following a conflict with the board of directors, Hall was sacked on 2 August 2012.

He swiftly signed a contract with Tusker Premier League club Sofapaka as their head coach on 12 September 2012, but resigned and returned to Azam after just seven weeks at the helm of Sofapaka. After allegations of player corruption, hall built a new team at AZam and left them top of the Vodacom premier league and unbeaten at the half way stage.

On 8 November 2013, Stewart Hall quit Azam. to take up the position of technical director of the Symbion power/ Sunderland FC Academy in Dar es Salaam. As part of his duties, Hall coached the Tanzanian National youth teams at U17 & U20 in the Afcon qualifiers v Kenya, Nigeria, and South Africa (home & away).

Following Stephen Constantine's departure as manager of Rwanda in 2015, Hall applied for the vacant position.

He returned to Azam a few weeks after the 'ice cream makers' side failed to defend their Vodacom Premier League (VPL) title in 2014–15 season. He won the 2015 cecafa kegame cup with Azam defeating Gor marhia 2–0. The club also finished league runners-up and reached the final of the domestic cup.

In October 2016, Hall was appointed as manager of A.F.C. Leopards, on a two-year contract, but was replaced by Dorian Marin in May 2017.

In November 2018, Hall was appointed as manager of Saint George S.C., on a two-year contract but resigned on 14 May 2019, with the club in 2nd position in the league due to political unrest in the country. Two weeks later the league was suspended. Hall then returned to Bangladesh to Saif Sporting Club to take up a new position of Technical Director. On 10 August 2019 Hall resigned the position and was instructed by management to carry out the full notice period of 45 days. Stewart returned to the UK on 1 November 2019

On 21 November 2019, Hall was appointed head coach of Kenyan club Wazito.

In January 2021, he came back as Head Coach of Saif Sporting Club Limited.

Hall was designated as head coach of the Philippines for the 2020 AFF Championship, in lieu of Scott Cooper Stewart appointed Technical director of Philippines on 1 January 2022 . His duties to include technical advisor to senior national team, U23 and U20, U17 national youth teams and coach education .
