= Kazi Rahad Mia =

Bangladeshi footballer

Personal information
- Full name: Mohammed Kazi Rahad Mia
- Date of birth: 15 July 2003 (age 23)
- Place of birth: Brahmanbaria, Bangladesh
- Height: 1.78 m (5 ft 10 in)
- Positions: Left-back; center-back

Team information
- Current team: Arambagh KS
- Number: 2

Senior career*
Years	Team	Apps	(Gls)
2018–2019	Victoria SC		
2019–2020	Brothers Union	0	(0)
2020–2021	Arambagh KS	19	(0)
2022–2023	Chittagong Abahani	5	(0)
2023–2024	Mohammedan SC	1	(0)
2024–2025	Dhaka Wanderers	2	(0)
2025–26	Arambagh KS	6	(0)

International career^{‡}
2019	Bangladesh U19	7	(0)
Medal record
Men's football
Representing Bangladesh
SAFF U-20 Championship
Runner-up	2019 Nepal	Team
- * Club domestic league appearances and goals as of 15 May 2026 ‡ National team caps and goals as of 10 November 2019

Kazi Rahad Mia (Bengali: কাজী রাহাদ মিয়া; born 15 July 2003) is a Bangladeshi professional footballer who plays as a left-back for Bangladesh Football League club Arambagh KS.

== Club career ==
=== Match-fixing accusations ===
In August 2021, Rahad was one of the 13 footballers from Arambagh KS banned by BFF initially for three years due to match-fixing. The ban was later reduced to one year by FIFA. Nonetheless, he denied the accusations stating "I am not involved (with match-fixing) in any way. I came to Dhaka to become a big footballer. But I don't understand what happened. Now I can't leave the house because of shame. What will I answer to everyone, including my family?".

== International career ==
In 2019, Rahad represented the Bangladesh U19 team at both the 2019 SAFF U-18 Championship and 2020 AFC U-19 Championship qualifiers.
