= Kwame Kizito =

Ghanaian footballer

Personal information
- Full name: Kwame Kizito
- Date of birth: July 21, 1996 (age 30)
- Place of birth: Anomabu, Ghana
- Height: 1.88 m (6 ft 2 in)
- Position: Forward

Team information
- Current team: Al Dhahra
- Number: 9

Youth career
- 2007: Golden Tulip FC
- 2009: FC Kolon Academy

Senior career*
Years	Team	Apps	(Gls)
2012–2013	Glow Lamp Soccer Academy	30	(26)
2014	Golden Lions Academy	32	(35)
2015–2017	Hearts of Oak	67	(56)
2018	Al-Ittihad		
2019	BK Häcken	13	(3)
2020–2022	Falkenbergs FF	26	(8)
2023	Ariana FC	26	(4)
2024–	Al Dhahra	4	(0)

International career
	Ghana U17	0	(0)
	Ghana U23	0	(0)
	Ghana U23	0	(0)
Medal record
Accra Hearts of Oak Sporting Club
Winner	President Cup, Accra Hearts of Oak Sporting Club	2015
Glow Lamp Soccer Academy, Ghana
Third place	Highest Goal Scorer Award, Glow Lamp Soccer Academy	2014
- * Club domestic league appearances and goals as of 22:39, 20 April 2025 (UTC)

Kwame Kizito (born 21 July 1996) is a Ghanaian footballer who plays as forward for Libyan Premier League side Al Dhahra.

== Early career ==
Kwame started his career with Ghanaian youth side, Golden Tulip FC. After an impressive season with the academy, he moved to FC Kolon Academy where he was scouted by Glow Lamps Academy. Playing Professional Football was something Kwame always dream about. In 2013, Golden Lions Soccer Academy Team A signed the Ghanaian youngster where he spend one season before getting the attraction of Ghana Premier League club Accra Hearts of Oak Sporting Club.

== Personal ==
Kwame was born at Anomabo, a town located in the Central Region of Ghana. He was born unto to union of Mr. and Mrs. Kizito (both parents are all Ghanaian citizens.

== Career statistics ==
Kwame played the following matches and scored the number of goals listed below:

Club	Apps	Goals
Glow Lamp Soccer Academy	30	6
Golden Lions Academy	32	3
Accra Hearts of Oak Sporting Club	30	8

== Personal Achievement ==
- 2014, Highest Goal Scorer Award, Glow Lamp Soccer Academy, Ghana

== Club Achievement ==
- 2015, President Cup Winner, Accra Hearts of Oak Sporting Club, Ghana
