= 2015–16 Bangladesh Premier League (football) =

9th professional season of the top-flight football league in Bangladesh

Bangladesh Premier League
- Season: 2015–16
- Dates: 24 July - 31 December 2016
- Champions: Dhaka Abahani (5th titles)
- Relegated: Uttar Baridhara Club; Feni SC
- AFC Cup: Dhaka Abahani
- Matches: 132
- Goals: 342 (2.59 per match)
- Top goalscorer: 19 goals (Nigeria) Sunday Chizoba
- Biggest home win: Chittagong Abahani 6–1 Uttar Baridhara (14 Aug 2016)
- Biggest away win: Feni Soccer Club 1–5 Arambagh (1 October 2016)
- Highest scoring: Brothers Union 4–5 Sheikh Jamal (25 September 2016)
- Longest winning run: 06 matches Dhaka Abahani
- Longest unbeaten run: 22 matches Dhaka Abahani
- Longest winless run: 10 matches Feni Soccer Club
- Longest losing run: 09 matches Uttar Baridhara

The 2015–16 Bangladesh Premier League (also known as JB Bangladesh Premier League for sponsorship reasons) was the ninth season of the Bangladesh Premier League since establishment of the league in 2007. A total of 12 teams competed in the league. The league began on 24 July 2016.

Saif Global Sports are the right holder of BPL's ninth edition and they will accommodate the advertising, branding, TV transmission, radio, marketing rights of the Bangladesh Premier League 2016.

Sheikh Jamal Dhanmondi Club are the defending champions, having won their Bangladesh Premier League title the previous season.

BFF has agreed to provide a purse of Taka thirty lacs as appearance money to each of the 12 participant teams for their accommodation and transportation outside the capital.

A total of 24 matches out of 132 matches were to be played in Dhaka and rest of the matches played outside Dhaka.

== Teams ==
=== Stadiums and locations ===
The matches will be held in the seven venues.

Locations of teams in Bangladesh Premier League 2016

Stadium	Location
Bangabandhu Stadium	Dhaka
M. A. Aziz Stadium	Chittagong
Abdur Rab Serniabat Stadium	Barisal
Sylhet District Stadium	Sylhet
Rajshahi District Stadium	Rajshahi
Mymensingh Stadium	Mymensingh
Sheikh Fazlul Haque Mani Stadium	Gopalganj

=== Personnel and sponsoring ===
Team	Head coach	Captain	Shirt sponsor	Kit manufacturer
Brothers Union	(India) Syed Nayeemuddin	(Bangladesh) Ebayet Hossen Komol	Biswas Builders Limited	
Chittagong Abahani Ltd.	(Bangladesh) Zulfiker Mahmud Mintu	(Bangladesh) Mamunul Islam	SAIF POWERTEC	
Dhaka Abahani Ltd.	(Austria) György Kottán	(Bangladesh) Ariful Islam		FBT
Dhaka Mohammedan SC Ltd.	(Bangladesh) Kazi Jasimuddin Ahmed Joshi	(Bangladesh) Tawhidul Alam Sabuz	Orion Group	
Feni Soccer Club	(Nigeria) Oladipupo Babalola	(Bangladesh) Akbor Hossain Ridon		
Muktijoddha Sangsad KC	(Bangladesh) Abdul Qaium Sentu	(Bangladesh) Saidul Haque		
Rahmatganj MFS	(Bangladesh) Kamal Babu	(Bangladesh) Shawkat Rasel	Tiger Cement	
Lt.Sheikh Jamal Dhanmondi Club Ltd.	(Sweden) Stefan Hansson	(Bangladesh) Yeasin Khan	YELLOW	
Arambagh KS	(Bangladesh) Saiful Bari Titu	(Bangladesh) Mitul Hasan		
Sheikh Russel KC	(Bangladesh) Shafiqul Islam Manik	(Bangladesh) Atiqur Rahman Meshu	Bashundhara Cement	Bashundhara Group
Team BJMC	(Bangladesh) Mong Kra Marma	(Bangladesh) Arifuzzaman Himel		
Uttar Baridhara SC	(Bangladesh) Mir Mohammad Ali Faruk	(Bangladesh) Sohel Rana		

== Foreign players ==
Club	Player 1	Player 2	Player 3	Player 4
Brothers Union	(Ghana) Abass Inusah	(Ghana) Awudu Ibrahim	(Haiti) Walson Augustin	(Nigeria) Nkwocha Kingsley Chigozie
Chittagong Abahani Ltd.	(Haiti) Fabrice Noël	(Haiti) Leonel Saint-Preux	(Morocco) Tarik El Janaby	(Bhutan) Chencho Gyeltshen
Dhaka Abahani Ltd.	(England) Lee Tuck	(Ghana) Samad Yussif	(Nigeria) Sunday Chizoba	(Senegal) Camara Sarba
Dhaka Mohammedan SC Ltd.	(Cameroon) Armand Joel Banaken Bassoken	(Cameroon) Landry Pouemi	(Cameroon) Patrice Nzekou Nguenheu	(Guinea) Ismael Bangoura
Feni Soccer Club	(The Gambia) Camara Mamadou Uba	(Ghana) Thuam Frank	(Nigeria) Uche Felix	
Lt.Sheikh Jamal Dhanmondi Club Ltd.	(The Gambia) Landing Darboe	(Haiti) Wedson Anselme	(Nigeria) Emeka Darlington	
Muktijoddha Sangsad KC	(Nigeria) Ahmed Kolo Musa	(Nigeria) Mufta Lawal	(Nigeria) Simon Ezeodika	
Rahmatganj MFS	(Democratic Republic of the Congo) Siyo Zunapio	(The Gambia) Dawda Ceesay	(The Gambia) Momodou Lamin Jatta	(Nigeria) Eleta Benjamin Jr.
Arambagh KS	(Cameroon) Steve Thomas	(Nigeria) Kester Akon	(Brazil) Thiago Tyson Silva	
Sheikh Russel KC	(Cameroon) Jean Jules Ikanga	(Cameroon) Paul Emile Biyaga	(Ethiopia) Fikru Teferra	
Team BJMC	(Cameroon) Baybeck Esaie	(Nigeria) Eleta Kingsley	(Nigeria) Samson Iliasu	(Nigeria) Samuel Adams
Uttar Baridhara SC	(Kenya) Collins Tiego	(Nigeria) Kosoko Olasukanmi	(Guinea) Mansa Sylla	(Brazil) Leonardo Lima

== League table ==
Pos	Team	Pld	W	D	L	GF	GA	GD	Pts	Qualification or relegation
1	Dhaka Abahani (C, Q)	22	15	7	0	48	16	+32	52	2017 AFC Cup
2	Chittagong Abahani	22	14	5	3	36	15	+21	47	
3	Sheikh Jamal	22	8	8	6	34	30	+4	32	
4	Brothers Union	22	7	9	6	37	34	+3	30	
5	Muktijoddha	22	8	6	8	28	28	0	30	
6	Arambagh KS	22	5	12	5	21	21	0	27	
7	Rahmatganj MFS	22	7	6	9	30	35	−5	27	
8	Sheikh Russel	22	6	7	9	19	24	−5	25	
9	Team BJMC	22	5	10	7	29	36	−7	25	
10	Mohammedan	22	3	11	8	20	29	−9	20	
11	Feni Soccer Club (R)	22	4	6	12	21	35	−14	18	Relegation to 2017 BCL
12	Uttar Baridhara (R)	22	5	3	14	19	39	−20	18	Relegation to 2017 BCL

Source: Soccerway FIFA
Rules for classification: 1) points; 2) head-to-head points; 3) head-to-head goal difference; 4) goal difference; 5) number of goals scored; 6) play-off match
(C) Champions; (Q) Qualify for the AFC competition; (R) Relegated

== Result ==
Home \ Away	AKS	BRO	CAL	DAL	FSC	MFS	SDC	SRK	BJM	MSC	MUK	UBS
Arambagh		2–2	0–1	0–2	0–0	0–0	2–0	1–0	0–0	0–0	0–3	1–1
Brothers Union	2–1		0–1	0–0	1–1	3–2	4–5	2–2	4–1	2–2	0–2	2–1
Chittagong Abahani	0–0	2–1		1–2	1–0	2–0	0–0	0–0	3–0	4–2	3–1	6–1
Dhaka Abahani	2–0	1–1	1–1		5–1	2–0	3–2	1–1	1–0	2–1	6–1	4–0
Feni Soccer Club	1–5	1–3	1–2	0–1		1–1	1–2	2–0	0–1	1–1	2–0	1–0
Rahmatganj MFS	2–2	4–3	2–0	1–3	1–1		1–0	2–0	3–2	1–2	0–2	0–2
Sheikh Jamal	1–1	0–0	1–0	3–3	3–1	1–1		0–1	1–1	1–1	3–2	2–0
Sheikh Russel	0–1	1–3	1–2	0–0	3–1	2–0	1–1		1–1	1–0	2–0	0–1
Team BJMC	1–1	1–1	1–3	1–2	2–1	5–4	2–3	1–1		1–1	3–2	2–1
Mohammedan	2–2	2–0	0–1	0–3	0–0	1–1	1–0	0–2	2–2		2–2	0–1
Muktijoddha Sangsad	0–0	1–1	1–1	1–1	2–0	1–2	1–0	2–0	1–1	2–0		0–1
Uttar Baridhara SC	1–2	1–2	0–2	1–3	1–4	0–2	3–5	3–0	0–0	0–0	0–1	

Updated to match(es) played on 28 November 2016. Source: FIFA
Legend: Blue = home team win; Yellow = draw; Red = away team win.

== Season statistics ==
=== Goalscorers ===
There have been 342 goals scored in 132 matches, for an average of 2.59 goals per match (as of December 2016).

19 goals

- (Nigeria) Sunday Chizoba (Dhaka Abahani)

14 goals

- (Nigeria) Nkwocha Kingsley Chigozie (Brothers Union)
- (Nigeria) Samson Iliasu (Team BJMC)

13 goals

- (Haiti) Walson Augustin (Brothers Union)

12 goals

- (Democratic Republic of the Congo) Siyo Zunapio (Rahmatganj MFS)

10 goals

- (England) Lee Tuck (Dhaka Abahani)

9 goals

- (Haiti) Wedson Anselme (Sheikh Jamal DC)
- (Nigeria) Emeka Darlington (Sheikh Jamal DC)
- (The Gambia) Landing Darboe (Sheikh Jamal DC)

8 goals

- (Bangladesh) Md Sajidur Rahman Sajid (Arambagh KS)
- (Bangladesh) Tawhidul Alam Sabuz (Dhaka Mohammedan SC)

7 goals

- (Haiti) Leonel Saint-Preux (Chittagong Abahani)
- (Nigeria) Eleta Kingsley (Team BJMC)

6 goals

- (Bangladesh) Zahid Hossain (Chittagong Abahani)
- (Nigeria) Ahmed Kolo Musa (Muktijoddha Sangsad KC)
- (Bangladesh) Chowmrin Rakhain (Feni Soccer Club)
- (Cameroon) Jean Jules Ikanga (Sheikh Russel KC)

5 goals

- (Bangladesh) Towhidul Alam Towhid (Muktijoddha Sangsad KC)
- (Nigeria) Uche Felix (Feni Soccer Club)
- (Bangladesh) Shakhawat Hossain Rony (Sheikh Russel KC)
- (Bangladesh) Mohammad Ibrahim (Chittagong Abahani)
- (Bangladesh) Nabib Newaj Jibon (Dhaka Abahani)
- (Bhutan) Chencho Gyeltshen (Chittagong Abahani)

4 goals

- (Bangladesh) Mehbub Hasan Nayon (Rahmatganj MFS)
- (Bangladesh) Khalekurzaman Sabuj (Uttar Baridhara SC)
- (Guinea) Ismael Bangoura (Dhaka Mohammedan SC)
- (Bangladesh) Jafar Iqbal (Arambagh KS)
- (Bangladesh) Jewel Rana (Dhaka Abahani)
- (Bangladesh) Mannaf Rabby (Brothers Union)
- (Ghana) Abass Inusah (Brothers Union)
- (England) Jonathan David (Dhaka Abahani)
- (Bangladesh) Jabed Khan (Muktijoddha Sangsad KC)

3 goals

- (Bangladesh) Rubel Miya (Chittagong Abahani)
- (Nigeria) Kester Akon (Arambagh KS)
- (Bangladesh) Mohammad Abdullah (Arambagh KS)
- (The Gambia) Dawda Ceesay (Rahmatganj MFS)
- (Bangladesh) Zakir Hossain Jiku (Team BJMC)
- (Bangladesh) Didarul Alam (Rahmatganj MFS)
- (Brazil) Leonardo Lima (Uttar Baridhara SC)
- (Bangladesh) Shafiqul Islam Bipul (Muktijoddha Sangsad KC)
- (Bangladesh) Mamunul Islam (Chittagong Abahani)

2 goals

- (Bangladesh) Enamul Haque (Sheikh Jamal DC)
- (Bangladesh) Sentu Chandra Sen (Uttar Baridhara SC)
- (Bangladesh) Md Alauddin (Rahmatganj MFS)
- (Bangladesh) Moklesur Rahman Mukul (Team BJMC)
- (Kenya) Collins Tiego (Uttar Baridhara SC)
- (Bangladesh) Md Jummon Hossain (Sheikh Russel KC)
- (Bangladesh) Md Monir Alam (Uttar Baridhara SC)
- (Bangladesh) Sohel Rana (Muktijoddha Sangsad KC)
- (Bangladesh) Aminur Rahman Sajib (Dhaka Mohammedan SC)
- (Cameroon) Patrice Nzekou Nguenheu (Dhaka Mohammedan SC)
- (Bangladesh) Mahabul Islam Himu (Feni Soccer Club)
- (Nigeria) Ndukaku Alison (Chittagong Abahani)
- (Bangladesh) Jamal Bhuyan (Sheikh Russel KC)
- (Nigeria) Simon Ezeodika (Muktijoddha Sangsad KC)
- (Bangladesh) Shahran Halder (Feni Soccer Club)
- (Ghana) Thuam Frank (Feni Soccer Club)
- (Bangladesh) Md Shihab (Sheikh Jamal DC)

1 goal

- (Bangladesh) Sushanto Tripura (Feni Soccer Club)
- (Bangladesh) Md Rakib (Sheikh Jamal DC)
- (Bangladesh) Abdul Malek (Dhaka Mohammedan SC)
- (Bangladesh) Habibur Rahman Sohag (Muktijoddha Sangsad KC)
- (Bangladesh) Monjurur Rahman Manik (Muktijoddha Sangsad KC)
- (Bangladesh) Nazmul Islam Rasel (Brothers Union)
- (Bangladesh) Mohammed Parvez (Feni Soccer Club)
- (Bangladesh) Raihan Hasan (Chittagong Abahani)
- (Bangladesh) Shakil Ahmed (Chittagong Abahani)
- (Bangladesh) Kazi Shariful Islam Shajib (Arambagh KS)
- (Bangladesh) Rohit Sarker (Uttar Baridhara SC)
- (Bangladesh) Md Akber Hossain Ridon (Feni Soccer Club)
- (Bangladesh) Masud Rana (Dhaka Mohammedan SC)
- (Bangladesh) Mazharul Islam Sourov (Uttar Baridhara SC)
- (Nigeria) Simon Ezeodika (Muktijoddha Sangsad KC)
- (Bangladesh) Hemanta Vincent Biswas (Dhaka Abahani)
- (Bangladesh) Sarower Zaman Nipu (Sheikh Jamal DC)
- (Bangladesh) Shah Alamgir Kabir Anik (Muktijoddha Sangsad KC)
- (Bangladesh) MD Sohel (Rahmatganj MFS)
- (Bangladesh) Atiqur Rahman Fahad (Dhaka Abahani)
- (Cameroon) Paul Emile Biyaga (Sheikh Russel KC)
- (The Gambia) Momodou Lamin Jatta (Rahmatganj MFS)
- (Brazil) Thiago Tyson Silva (Arambagh KS)
- (Bangladesh) Faisal Ahmed Shitol (Uttar Baridhara SC)
- (Bangladesh) Saad Uddin (Dhaka Abahani)
- (Nigeria) Eleta Benjamin Jr. (Rahmatganj MFS)
- (Bangladesh) Nasirul Islam Nasir (Sheikh Russel KC)
- (Bangladesh) Shaikat Mahmud (Team BJMC)
- (Bangladesh) Sujon Biswas (Uttar Baridhara SC)
- (Bangladesh) Wahed Ahmed (Dhaka Abahani)
- (Bangladesh) Shofiqul Islam Shofi (Brothers Union)
- (Bangladesh) Masuk Mia Jony (Dhaka Mohammedan SC)
- (The Gambia) Camara Mamadou Uba (Uttar Baridhara SC)
- (Bangladesh) Md Helal (Feni Soccer Club)
- (Bangladesh) Saikat Bhoumik (Muktijoddha Sangsad KC)
- (Bangladesh) Mohamed Mintu Sheikh (Sheikh Russel KC)
- (Cameroon) Landry Pouemi (Dhaka Mohammedan SC)
- (Bangladesh) Mehedi Hassan Tapu (Team BJMC)
- (Bangladesh) Rafiqur Rahman Mamun (Rahmatganj MFS)
- (Bangladesh) Nasiruddin Chowdhury (Chittagong Abahani)
- (Bangladesh) Emon Mahmud Babu (Dhaka Abahani)
- (Bangladesh) Faisal Mahmud (Dhaka Abahani)
- (Cameroon) Baybeck Esaie (Team BJMC)
- (Bangladesh) Imtiaz Sultan Jitu (Brothers Union)
- (Bangladesh) Rana (Sheikh Russel KC)
- (Bangladesh) Manik (Chittagong Abahani)
- (Bangladesh) Kawsar Ali Rabbi (Brothers Union)

=== Own goals ===
† Bold Club indicates winner of the match

Player	Club	Opponent	Result	Date	Ref.
(Ghana) Moro Mohammad	Feni Soccer Club	Sheikh Jamal DC	1–3	11 August 2016	
(Bangladesh) Saidul Islam	Muktijoddha SKC	Rahmatganj MFS	1–2	30 September 2016	
(Bangladesh) Krishna Pada	Brothers Union	Rahmatganj MFS	3–4	16 October 2016	
(Bangladesh) Didarul Haque	Sheikh Jamal DC	Arambagh KS	0–2	1 November 2016	
(Bangladesh) Bishwanath Ghosh	Dhaka Mohammedan	Chittagong Abahani	0–1	7 November 2016	

=== Hat-tricks ===
Player	For	Against	Result	Date	Ref.
(Nigeria) Sunday Chizoba	Dhaka Abahani	Feni Soccer Club	5–1	7 November 2022	
(England) Lee Tuck	Dhaka Abahani	Muktijoddha Sangsad KC	6–1	19 November 2022	
(Nigeria) Eleta Kingsley	Team BJMC	Rahmatganj MFS	5–4	13 December 2022	
(Democratic Republic of the Congo) Siyo Zunapio	Rahmatganj MFS	Team BJMC	4–5	13 December 2022	
