= 2011–12 Bangladesh Premier League (football) =

5th professional season of the top-flight football league in Bangladesh

Bangladesh Premier League
- Season: 2011–12
- Dates: 1 February - 3 July 2012
- Champions: Dhaka Abahani
- Relegated: Farashganj SC, Rahmatganj MFS
- AFC President's Cup: Dhaka Abahani
- Matches: 110
- Goals: 295 (2.68 per match)
- Top goalscorer: 17 goals (Guinea) Ismael Bangoura (Team BJMC)
- Biggest home win: Muktijoddha Sangsad KC 5–0 Feni Soccer Club (15 May 2012)
- Biggest away win: Arambagh KS 0–5 Team BJMC (7 April 2012)
- Highest scoring: Brothers Union 5–2 Rahmatganj MFS (11 March 2012); Arambagh KS 3–4 Brothers Union (12 May 2012)
- Longest winning run: 5 matches Dhaka Abahani
- Longest unbeaten run: 12 matches Dhaka Abahani
- Longest winless run: 15 matches Rahmatganj MFS
- Longest losing run: 12 matches Rahmatganj MFS

The 2011–12 Bangladesh Premier league is also known as Grameenphone Bangladesh Premier League due to the sponsorship from Grameenphone. It was the 5th edition of the Bangladesh Premier League, and 1st since being renamed from the Bangladesh League. The league started on 1 February 2012 and finished on 3 July 2012. 11 teams competed with each other on a home and away basis.

== 2012 Bangladesh Premier League teams and locations ==
Locations of teams in the 2012 Bangladesh Premier League

Clubs:

- Dhaka Abahani, Dhaka
- Arambagh KS, Dhaka
- Brothers Union, Dhaka
- Farashganj SC, Dhaka
- Feni Soccer Club, Feni
- Dhaka Mohammedan, Dhaka
- Muktijoddha Sangsad KS, Dhaka
- Rahmatganj MFS, Dhaka
- Sheikh Russel KC, Dhaka
- Sheikh Jamal Dhanmondi Club, Dhaka
- Team BJMC, Tangail

Stadiums:

- Bangabandhu National Stadium, Dhaka
- BSSS Mostafa Kamal Stadium, Dhaka
- Shaheed Salam Stadium, Feni
- Tangail Stadium, Tangail

== Final standings ==
Pos	Team	Pld	W	D	L	GF	GA	GD	Pts	Qualification or relegation
1	Dhaka Abahani Limited (C, Q)	20	13	6	1	42	15	+27	45	2013 AFC President's Cup
2	Muktijoddha Sangsad	20	13	5	2	43	10	+33	44	
3	Dhaka Mohammedan Sporting Club	20	9	7	4	33	21	+12	34	
4	Team BJMC	20	9	6	5	32	20	+12	33	
5	Sheikh Russel KC	20	9	5	6	30	20	+10	32	
6	Sheikh Jamal Dhanmondi Club	20	7	4	9	27	33	−6	25	
7	Brothers Union	20	6	6	8	25	35	−10	24	
8	Arambagh KS	20	5	4	11	20	37	−17	19	
9	Feni Soccer Club	20	5	4	11	15	32	−17	19	
10	Farashganj SC (R)	20	4	6	10	15	26	−11	18	2013 Bangladesh Championship League
11	Rahmatganj MFS (R)	20	2	3	15	13	46	−33	9	2013 Bangladesh Championship League

Updated to match(es) played on 3 July 2012. Source: Soccerway
Rules for classification: 1) points; 2) goal difference; 3) number of goals scored.
(C) Champions; (Q) Qualify for the AFC competition; (R) Relegated

== Season statistics ==
=== Goalscorers ===
There have been 295 goals scored in 110 matches, for an average of 2.68 goals per match (as of 9 July 2012).

17 goals

- (Guinea) Ismael Bangoura (Team BJMC)

15 goals

- (Nigeria) Sunday Chizoba (Muktijoddha Sangsad KC)

13 goals

- (Nigeria) Otofe Lucky Paul (Dhaka Abahani)
- (Democratic Republic of the Congo) Siyo Zunapio (Farashganj SC)

11 goals

- (Ghana) Twum Frank (Dhaka Abahani)

10 goals

- (Nigeria) Kester Akon (Sheikh Jamal DC)

9 goals

- (Nigeria) Kingsley Chigozie (Brothers Union)

8 goals

- (Nigeria) Eleta Kingsley (Arambagh KS)
- (Nigeria) Abakporo Rowland (Feni Soccer Club)

7 goals

- (Nigeria) Bazden Wilcox (Dhaka Mohammedan)
- (Nigeria) Alamu Bukola Olalekan (Sheikh Russel KC)

6 goals

- (Uganda) Idris Kasiry (Rahmatganj MFS)
- (Brazil) Wellinstone De Sauza Lima (Muktijoddha Sangsad KC)
- (Bangladesh) Mithun Chowdhury (Muktijoddha Sangsad KC)
- (Nigeria) Uzumefun Joel (Arambagh KS)
- (Nigeria) Olalekan Joshua (Brothers Union)
- (Bangladesh) Anowar Hossain (Sheikh Russel KC)

5 goals

- (Bangladesh) Zahid Hasan Ameli (Muktijoddha Sangsad KC)
- (Bangladesh) Md. Roni (Dhaka Mohammedan)

4 goals

- (Bangladesh) Wahed Ahmed (Dhaka Mohammedan)
- (Nigeria) Nche Francis (Rahmatganj MFS)

3 goals

- (Bangladesh) Atiqur Rahman Meshu (Sheikh Jamal DC)
- (Liberia) Benjamin Cooper (Arambagh KS)
- (Bangladesh) Arman Aziz (Dhaka Abahani)
- (Ghana) Awudu Ibrahim (Dhaka Abahani)
- (Bangladesh) Tawhidul Alam Sabuz (Sheikh Jamal DC)
- (Bangladesh) Mijbaul Haque Manik (Sheikh Russel KC)
- (Bangladesh) Nasiruddin Chowdhury (Muktijoddha Sangsad KC)
- (Benin) Oladikpikpo Okalawon (Dhaka Mohammedan)
- (Nigeria) Umukoro Godwun (Arambagh KS)
- (Bangladesh) Iqbal Hossain Bhuiyan (Feni Soccer Club)
- (Nigeria) Nduka Uwa (Dhaka Mohammedan)
- (Brazil) Generoso Da Silva (Dhaka Abahani)
- (Bangladesh) Sohel Rana (Sheikh Jamal DC)
- (Bangladesh) Abdul Rashid Ajagun (Team BJMC)
- (Bangladesh) Md. Yusuf (Sheikh Russel KC)
- (Bangladesh) Zahid Hossain (Dhaka Abahani)

2 goals

- (Morocco) Moro Mohammad (Sheikh Russel KC)
- (Cameroon) Ernest Siankam Emako (Sheikh Russel KC)
- (Bangladesh) Md. Tawhidul Alam (Dhaka Abahani)
- (Bangladesh) Md. Biplob (Team BJMC)
- (Cameroon) Jean Jules Ikanga (Team BJMC)
- (Nigeria) Joswph Afusi (Sheikh Jamal DC)
- (Bangladesh) Monaem Khan (Sheikh Jamal DC)
- (Nigeria) Uche Felix (Team BJMC)
- (Bangladesh) Mobarak Hossain (Dhaka Mohammedan)
- (Bangladesh) Dedarul Alam (Brothers Union)
- (Brazil) Raphael De Androde (Muktijoddha Sangsad KC)
- (Bangladesh) Emon Mahmud Babu (Sheikh Russel KC)
- (Bangladesh) Rojoni Kanta Barman (Dhaka Mohammedan)
- (Cameroon) Atangana Paulin (Feni Soccer Club)
- (Nigeria) Adams Jankasa (Brothers Union)
- (Nigeria) Victory Antony (Brothers Union)
- (Bangladesh) Shakhawat Hossain Rony (Dhaka Abahani)
- (Bangladesh) Md. Ariful Islam (Muktijoddha Sangsad KC)

1 goal

- (Bangladesh) Kokhon Chandra Dus (Team BJMC)
- (Bangladesh) Mobarak Hossain (Dhaka Mohammedan)
- (Bangladesh) Md. Malek (Brothers Union)
- (Cameroon) Mr. Bayebeck (Team BJMC)
- (Bangladesh) Abul Hossain (Team BJMC)
- (Bangladesh) Maksudul Alom Bulbul (Feni Soccer Club)
- (Nigeria) Femi Orunimi (Sheikh Jamal DC)
- (Cameroon) Steve Thomas Yoko (Sheikh Jamal DC)
- (Bangladesh) Alfaz Ahmed (Team BJMC)
- (Bangladesh) Rashed Hossain Biplob (Rahmatganj MFS)
- (Nigeria) Osiuki Kelechi Joseph (Dhaka Mohammedan)
- (Bangladesh) Shamsuzzaman Shohel (Rahmatganj MFS)
- (Nigeria) Divine Chibiuke (Muktijoddha Sangsad KC)
- (Bangladesh) Touhidul Siddique (Brothers Union)
- (Bangladesh) Shahedul Alam Shahed (Feni Soccer Club)
- (Bangladesh) Shariful Hossain (Dhaka Mohammedan)
- (Bangladesh) Abdullah Al Parvez (Team BJMC)
- (Senegal) Habib Diouf (Brothers Union )
- (Bangladesh) Masud Rana (Sheikh Jamal DC)
- (Bangladesh) Shirfin Rahman Rony (Rahmatganj MFS)
- (Nigeria) Henry Chindo (Farashganj SC)
- (Bangladesh) Faisal Mahmud (Sheikh Russel KC)
- (Bangladesh) Md. Shihab (Muktijoddha Sangsad KC)
- (Senegal) Mauchid Lyane (Sheikh Russel KC)
- (Cameroon) Frank Olivier (Sheikh Russel KC)
- (Bangladesh) Sohel Rana (Dhaka Mohammedan)
- (Bangladesh) Saiful Islam Saif (Team BJMC)
- (Bangladesh) Jamal Hossain (Brothers Union)
- (Bangladesh) Mamunul Islam (Muktijoddha Sangsad KC)
- (Nigeria) Udeh Damian Chigozie (Dhaka Mohammedan)
- (Bangladesh) Md. Linkon (Dhaka Abahani)
- (Cameroon) Allie Ahmed Jaward (Sheikh Jamal DC)
- (Bangladesh) Bappi hasan Murad (Sheikh Russel KC)
- (Nigeria) Akinyele Peter (Farashganj SC)
- (Bangladesh) Pranotosh Kumar Das (Dhaka Abahani)
- (Bangladesh) Habibur Rahman Sohag (Dhaka Mohammedan)
- (Bangladesh) Maruf Ahmed (Muktijoddha Sangsad KC)
- (Bangladesh) Md. Yeasin (Dhaka Mohammedan)

=== Hat-tricks ===
Player	For	Against	Result	Date	Ref
(Nigeria) Sunday Chizoba	Muktijoddha Sangsad KC	Arambagh KS	4–1	22 February 2012	
(Nigeria) Eleta Kingsley	Arambagh KS	Sheikh Jamal DC	3–0	28 February 2012	
(Nigeria) Otofe Lucky Paul ^{4}	Dhaka Abahani	Feni Soccer Club	5–0	11 April 2012	
(Uganda) Idris Kasiry	Rahmatganj MFS	Brothers Union	4–0	25 April 2012	
(Nigeria) Otofe Lucky Paul ^{4}	Dhaka Abahani	Rahmatganj MFS	4–0	11 May 2012	
(Nigeria) Kingsley Chigozie	Brothers Union	Arambagh KS	4–3	12 May 2012	
(Brazil) Sauza Lima	Muktijoddha Sangsad KC	Arambagh KS	4–1	24 May 2012	
(Guinea) Ismael Bangoura	Team BJMC	Farashganj SC	3–1	27 May 2012	
(Bangladesh) Mijbaul Haque Manik	Sheikh Russel KC	Brothers Union	3–1	30 May 2012	
(Democratic Republic of the Congo) Siyo Zunapio	Farashganj SC	Rahmatganj MFS	4–0	3 June 2012	
(Nigeria) Abakporo Rowland	Feni Soccer Club	Rahmatganj MFS	3–0	9 June 2012	

^{n} Player scored n goals.
