= 2012–13 Bangladesh Premier League (football) =

6th professional season of the top-flight football league in Bangladesh

Bangladesh Premier League
- Season: 2012–13
- Dates: 13 November 2012 - 8 May 2013
- Champions: Sheikh Russell
- Relegated: Arambagh
- AFC President's Cup: Sheikh Russell
- Matches: 72
- Goals: 162 (2.25 per match)
- Top goalscorer: 12 goals (Ghana) Osei Morrison
- Biggest home win: Sheikh Jamal DC 4–0 Arambagh KS (29 December 2012)
- Biggest away win: Arambagh KS 0–6 Sheikh Russel KC (4 January 2013)
- Highest scoring: Team BJMC 3–4 Sheikh Russel KC (3 February 2013)
- Longest winning run: 4 matches Sheikh Russel KC
- Longest unbeaten run: 11 matches Sheikh Jamal DC
- Longest winless run: 7 matches Brothers Union
- Longest losing run: 6 matches Feni Soccer Club; Brothers Union

The 2012–13 Bangladesh Premier league is also known as Grameenphone Bangladesh Premier League due to the sponsorship from Grameenphone. It was the 6th edition of the Bangladesh Premier League. The league started on 13 November 2012 and finished on 8 May 2013.

Nine teams competed with each other on a home and away basis with Sheikh Russell claiming their first Bangladesh Premier League championship and qualification to the 2014 AFC President's Cup. While Arambagh suffered relegation.

== 2012–13 Bangladesh Premier League teams and locations ==
Locations of teams in the 2012-13 Bangladesh Premier League

Rahmatganj MFS and Farashganj SC, both representing the city of Dhaka were relegated last season. No teams appeared to replace them so the league would feature only nine sides.

Club	Stadium	Location
Arambagh	Bangabandhu National Stadium	Dhaka
Brothers Union	Bangabandhu National Stadium	Dhaka
Abahani Limited Dhaka	Bangabandhu National Stadium	Dhaka
Mohammedan SC	Bangabandhu National Stadium	Dhaka
Feni Soccer Club	Shaheed Salam Stadium	Feni
Muktijoddha Sangsad	Sheikh Fazlul Haque Mani Stadium	Gopalganj
Sheikh Jamal	Bangabandhu National Stadium	Dhaka
Sheikh Russell	Bangabandhu National Stadium	Dhaka
Team BJMC	Bangabandhu National Stadium	Dhaka

== Standings ==
=== League table ===
Pos	Team	Pld	W	D	L	GF	GA	GD	Pts	Qualification or relegation
1	Sheikh Russel KC (C, Q)	16	12	2	2	30	14	+16	38	2014 AFC President's Cup and 2015 AFC Cup
2	Sheikh Jamal Dhanmondi Club	16	9	4	3	21	10	+11	31	
3	Abahani Limited Dhaka	16	8	5	3	23	15	+8	29	
4	Team BJMC	16	7	5	4	23	18	+5	26	
5	Mohammedan Sporting Club	16	7	4	5	17	17	0	25	
6	Muktijoddha Sangsad	16	5	4	7	14	13	+1	19	
7	Feni Soccer Club	16	3	3	10	13	23	−10	12	
8	Brothers Union	16	2	5	9	14	23	−9	11	
9	Arambagh KS (R)	16	3	0	13	7	29	−22	9	2014 Bangladesh Championship League

Updated to match(es) played on 2 February 2013. Source: Soccerway
Rules for classification: 1) points; 2) goal difference; 3) number of goals scored.
(C) Champions; (Q) Qualify for the AFC competition; (R) Relegated

== Season statistics ==
=== Goalscorers ===
There have been 162 goals scored in 72 matches, for an average of 2.25 goals per match (as of 9 March 2013).

12 goals

- (Ghana) Osei Morrison (Mohammedan SC)

9 goals

- (Guinea) Ismael Bangoura (Team BJMC)

7 goals

- (Nigeria) Sunday Chizoba (Sheikh Jamal DC)
- (Bangladesh) Shakhawat Hossain Rony (Abahani Limited Dhaka)

6 goals

- (Bangladesh) Zahid Hasan Ameli (Sheikh Russel KC)
- (Haiti) Sony Norde (Sheikh Russel KC)
- (Nigeria) Kingsley Chigozie (Brothers Union)
- (Bangladesh) Zahid Hossain (Sheikh Russel KC)

4 goals

- (Bangladesh) Toklis Ahmed (Team BJMC)
- (Nigeria) Eleta Kingsley (Team BJMC)
- (Nigeria) Mike Otozareri (Sheikh Jamal DC )
- (Liberia) Anthony Pole Doe (Feni Soccer Club)
- (Brazil) Thiago Tyson Silva (Muktijoddha Sangsad KC)

3 goals

- (Nigeria) Chigozie Darlington (Muktijoddha Sangsad KC)
- (Nigeria) Otofe Lucky Paul (Abahani Limited Dhaka)
- (Morocco) Tarik El Janaby (Sheikh Russel KC)
- (Bangladesh) Mithun Chowdhury (Sheikh Russel KC)

2 goals

- (Nigeria) Victory Antony (Feni Soccer Club)
- (Bangladesh) Touhidul Alam (Abahani Limited Dhaka)
- (Brazil) Generaso Da Silva (Abahani Limited Dhaka)
- (Nigeria) Augustine Chizoba (Mohammedan SC)
- (Bangladesh) Shakil Ahmed (Sheikh Jamal DC)
- (Ghana) Twum Frank (Abahani Limited Dhaka)
- (Nigeria) Ajagun Abdur Rasheed (Team BJMC)
- (Bangladesh) Aminur Rahman Sajib (Feni Soccer Club)
- (Nigeria) Adams Jankasa (Brothers Union)
- (Bangladesh) Mobarak Hossain Bhuiyan (Mohammedan SC)
- (Nigeria) Joseph Ozurumba (Muktijoddha Sangsad KC)
- (Nigeria) Emmanuel Ariwachukuu (Sheikh Jamal DC)
- (Nigeria) Alfred Emoefe (Sheikh Jamal DC )
- (Brazil) Garcia Anderson (Brothers Union)

1 goal

- (Cameroon) Yoko Samnick (Abahani Limited Dhaka)
- (Uganda) Idris Kasirye (Arambagh KS)
- (Bangladesh) Raihan Hasan (Sheikh Jamal DC)
- (Bangladesh) Md Shakil (Team BJMC)
- (Bangladesh) Shariful Islam (Mohammedan SC)
- (Nigeria) Abu Oludotun Paul (Arambagh KS)
- (Bosnia and Herzegovina) Bojan Petric (Sheikh Russel KC)
- (Bangladesh) Akbar Hossain Riddon (Feni Soccer Club)
- (Bangladesh) Tohidul Islam Siddik (Feni Soccer Club)
- (Morocco) Tarek al Marzouk (Sheikh Russel KC)
- (Bangladesh) Rokunuzzaman Kanchan (Muktijoddha Sangsad KC)
- (Bangladesh) Rajon Mia (Sheikh Russel KC)
- (Bangladesh) Md. Rony (Muktijoddha Sangsad KC)
- (Bangladesh) Md. Yousuf (Muktijoddha Sangsad KC)
- (Bangladesh) Pranotosh Kumar Das (Abahani Limited Dhaka)
- (Nigeria) Henry Chindo (Team BJMC)
- (Bangladesh) Mamunul Islam (Sheikh Russel KC)
- (Bangladesh) Ariful Haque Saikat (Feni Soccer Club)
- (Ghana) Awudu Ibrahim (Abahani Limited Dhaka)
- (Nigeria) Samson Illiasu (Brothers Union)
- (Bangladesh) Sabuj Kumar Biswas (Arambagh KS)
- (Bangladesh) MD. Komol Islam (Brothers Union)
- (Bangladesh) Topu Barman (Mohammedan SC)
- (Bangladesh) Rezaul Karim (Sheikh Russel KC)
- (Bangladesh) Yousuf Sifat (Brothers Union)
- (Nigeria) Chibuke Ibiji (Sheikh Jamal DC )
- (Bangladesh) Tawhidul Alam Sabuz (Mohammedan SC)
- (Bangladesh) Atiqur Rahman Meshu( Abahani Limited Dhaka)
- (Bangladesh) Moniruzzaman Mamun (Arambagh KS)
- (Benin) Wassiou Okalawan Oladikpikro (Feni Soccer Club)
- (Bangladesh) Khokan Das (Arambagh KS)
- (Bangladesh) Abdul Baten Mojumdar Komol (Abahani Limited Dhaka)
- (Bangladesh) Zahid Parvez Chowdhury (Muktijoddha Sangsad KC)
- (Bangladesh) Azmol Hossain Biddyut (Muktijoddha Sangsad KC)
- (Bangladesh) Moklesur Rahman (Team BJMC)
- (Bangladesh) Abdullah Al Parvez (Team BJMC)
- (Nigeria) Abu Oludotun Paul (Arambagh KS)
- (Nigeria) Alamu Bukola Olalekan (Sheikh Russel KC)
- (Bangladesh) Sharan Hawlader (Feni Soccer Club)

=== Own goals ===
† Bold Club indicates winner of the match

Player	Club	Opponent	Result	Date
(Bangladesh) Moniruzzaman Mamun	Arambagh KS	Abahani Limited Dhaka	1–2	24 November 2012

=== Hat-tricks ===
Player	For	Against	Result	Date	Ref
(Ghana) Osei Morrison	Mohammedan SC	Brothers Union	3–0	14 November 2012	
