= 2010 Bangladesh League =

4th professional season of the top-flight football league in Bangladesh

Bangladesh League
- Season: 2010–11
- Dates: 27 December 2010 - 27 June 2011
- Champions: Sheikh Jamal DC
- Relegated: Chittagong Mohammedan, Chittagong Abahani
- AFC President's Cup: Sheikh Jamal DC
- Matches: 132
- Goals: 334 (2.53 per match)
- Top goalscorer: 19 goals (South Sudan) James Moga
- Biggest home win: Muktijoddha Sangsad KC 6–0 Chittagong Mohammedan SC (12 March 2011); Sheikh Jamal DC 6–0 Chittagong Abahani (11 May 2011)
- Biggest away win: Farashganj SC 0–5 Muktijoddha Sangsad KC (1 March 2011)
- Highest scoring: Sheikh Jamal DC 5–2 Rahmatganj MFS (11 June 2011)
- Longest winning run: 5 matches Muktijoddha Sangsad KC
- Longest unbeaten run: 18 matches Sheikh Jamal DC
- Longest winless run: 22 matches Chittagong Abahani
- Longest losing run: 6 matches Chittagong Abahani

The 2010 Grameenphone Bangladesh League started on the 27 December 2010. 12 teams competed with each other on a home and away basis. It was the fourth Bangladeshi league season in the professional and the second since being was renamed from B League to Bangladesh League in order to combat suggestions that it is a second-tier league. Sheikh Jamal Dhanmondi Club won the league and won the right to represent Bangladesh in the 2012 AFC President's Cup (later withdrawing from the continental competition).

== Clubs and stadiums ==
Locations of teams in the 2010-11 Bangladesh League

Clubs:

- Chittagong Abahani, Chittagong
- Dhaka Abahani, Dhaka
- Arambagh, Dhaka
- Brothers Union, Dhaka
- Farashganj, Dhaka
- Feni Soccer Club, Feni
- Chittagong Mohammedan, Chittagong
- Dhaka Mohammedan, Dhaka
- Muktijoddha Sangsad, Dhaka
- Rahmatganj, Dhaka
- Sheikh Russell, Dhaka
- Sheikh Jamal Dhanmondi Club, Dhaka

Stadiums:

- BSSS Mostafa Kamal Stadium, Dhaka
- MA Aziz Stadium, Chittagong
- Shaheed Salam Stadium, Feni
- Cox's Bazar Stadium, Cox's Bazar

== Final standings ==
Pos	Team	Pld	W	D	L	GF	GA	GD	Pts	Qualification or relegation
1	Sheikh Jamal Dhanmondi Club (C)	22	15	6	1	42	12	+30	51	2012 AFC President's Cup
2	Muktijoddha Sangsad	22	15	5	2	52	15	+37	50	
3	Sheikh Russel KC	22	13	5	4	35	16	+19	44	
4	Dhaka Abahani Limited	22	13	5	4	30	15	+15	44	
5	Brothers Union	22	8	6	8	31	30	+1	30	
6	Dhaka Mohammedan Sporting Club	22	8	6	8	26	26	0	30	
7	Arambagh KS	22	7	6	9	26	27	−1	27	
8	Rahmatganj MFS	22	7	3	12	29	48	−19	24	
9	Feni Soccer Club	22	4	9	9	22	30	−8	21	
10	Farashganj SC	22	4	7	11	17	32	−15	19	
11	Chittagong Mohammedan Sporting Club (R)	22	4	5	13	18	41	−23	17	Chittagong League
12	Chittagong Abahani Limited (R)	22	0	5	17	9	45	−36	5	2012 Bangladesh Championship League

Updated to match(es) played on 27 June 2011. Source: Soccerway
Rules for classification: 1) points; 2) goal difference; 3) number of goals scored.
(C) Champions; (R) Relegated

== Season statistics ==
=== Goalscorers ===
There have been 334 goals scored in 132 matches, for an average of 2.53 goals per match (as of July 2011).

19 goals

- (South Sudan) James Moga (Muktijoddha Sangsad KC)

16 goals

- (Bangladesh) Mithun Chowdhury (Muktijoddha Sangsad KC)

15 goals

- (Ghana) Twum Frank (Dhaka Abahani)

14 goals

- (Guinea) Ismael Bangoura (Arambagh KS)

13 goals

- (Uganda) Idris Kasiry (Rahmatganj MFS)

12 goals

- (Nigeria) Sunday Chizoba (Dhaka Mohammedan)

10 goals

- (Russia) Eduard Sakhnevich (Sheikh Russel KC)

9 goals

- (Liberia) Jerry Odesco (Chittagong Mohammedan)

8 goals

- (Bangladesh) Md. Sohel Rana (Farashganj SC)
- (Nigeria) Emmanual Ayuk (Sheikh Jamal DC)
- (Nigeria) Kingsley Chigozie (Brothers Union)

6 goals

- (Bangladesh) Shakhawat Hossain Rony (Dhaka Abahani)
- (Nigeria) Abakporo Rowland (Feni Soccer Club)
- (Bangladesh) Zahid Hasan Ameli (Sheikh Jamal DC)
- (Liberia) Benjamin Cooper (Arambagh KS)
- (Bangladesh) Md. Tauhidul Alam (Feni Soccer Club )

5 goals

- (Brazil) Danilo Santos Rafael Vivaldo (Brothers Union)
- (Brazil) Everton Souza (Brothers Union)

4 goals

- (Nigeria) Paul Macjames (Rahmatganj MFS)
- (Cameroon) Bitcha Richard (Brothers Union)
- (Bangladesh) Anwar Hossain (Dhaka Mohammedan)
- (Bangladesh) Ariful Kabir Farhad (Chittagong Mohammedan)
- (Bangladesh) Subair Muhammed (Arambagh KS)
- (Bangladesh) Mohammed Sujan (Sheikh Jamal DC)
- (Bangladesh) Pusbon Molla (Rahmatganj MFS)

3 goals

- (Morocco) Chahrout Youssef (Sheikh Russel KC)
- (Bangladesh) Rajani Kanta Barman (Muktijoddha Sangsad KC)
- (Ghana) Enock Bentil (Brothers Union)
- (Cameroon) Jimgou Guy Charles (Sheikh Russel KC)
- (Bangladesh) K M Masudul Alam Bulbul (Feni Soccer Club)
- (Bangladesh) Wahed Ahmed (Sheikh Russel KC)
- (Cameroon) Modo Hugus (Sheikh Jamal DC)&(Rahmatganj MFS)
- (Rwanda) Uwiringiyimana Amani (Dhaka Mohammedan)
- (Ghana) Abbas Inusah (Sheikh Russel KC)
- (Bangladesh) Tanmay Hossain (Brothers Union)
- (Russia) Boris Kochkin (Muktijoddha Sangsad KC)
- (Nigeria) Onokoro Felix (Rahmatganj MFS)
- (Cameroon) Stephan Loga Bouga (Sheikh Jamal DC)
- (Democratic Republic of the Congo) Siyo Zunapio (Farashganj SC)
- (Cameroon) Sergio Fils Chico (Sheikh Jamal DC)
- (Nigeria) Nche Francis (Feni Soccer Club)
- (Bangladesh) Md. Jewel Rana (Farashganj SC)
- (Bangladesh) Md. Yousuf (Sheikh Russel KC)
- (Nigeria) Alamu Bukola Olalekan (Muktijoddha Sangsad KC)
- (Ghana) Awudu Ibrahim (Dhaka Abahani)

2 goals

- (Morocco) Samir Omari (Sheikh Russel KC)
- (Bangladesh) Rony Islam (Dhaka Mohammedan)
- (Nigeria) Emeka Christian IBE(Dhaka Mohammedan)
- (Nigeria) Akinyele Peter Akinkunm (Chittagong Abahani)
- (Bangladesh) Khaled Hossain (Chittagong Mohammedan)
- (Bangladesh) Touhidul Islam Siddiquee (Chittagong Abahani)
- (Bangladesh) Pranotosh Kumar Das (Dhaka Abahani)
- (Bangladesh) Alamgir Kabir Rana (Muktijoddha Sangsad KC)
- (Bangladesh) Zahid Hossain (Sheikh Jamal DC)
- (Bangladesh) Enamul Haque (Sheikh Jamal DC)
- (Bangladesh) Ariful Islam (Sheikh Jamal DC)
- (Bangladesh) Monayem Khan Raju (Sheikh Russel KC)
- (Bangladesh) Mijba ul Huq Manik (Sheikh Russel KC)
- (Bangladesh) Mamunul Islam (Sheikh Jamal DC)
- (Bangladesh) Shakil Ahmed (Sheikh Jamal DC)
- (Cameroon) Effong Duke (Sheikh Russel KC)
- (Bangladesh) Md. Robin (Dhaka Abahani)
- (Bangladesh) Faisal Mahmud (Brothers Union)

1 goal

- Md. Ismael (Dhaka Mohammedan)
- (Bangladesh) Md Jamal (Rahmatganj MFS)
- (Morocco) Abbas Inusah (Sheikh Russel KC)
- (Bangladesh) Tawhidul Alam Sabuz (Sheikh Jamal DC)
- (Bangladesh) Dhiman Barua (Chittagong Abahani)
- (Serbia) Dragan Perisic (Sheikh Jamal DC)
- (Morocco) Mohammed Yusuf (Sheikh Russel KC)
- (Bangladesh) Mehedi Hassan Tapu (Brothers Union)
- (Bangladesh) Rokonuzzaman Kanchan (Muktijoddha Sangsad KC)
- (Nigeria) Emeka Lucky Uti (Dhaka Mohammedan)
- (Bangladesh) Kalu Johnson (Farashganj SC)
- (Liberia) Clatus Blamo (Chittagong Mohammedan)
- (Ghana) Yusif Aminu (Dhaka Abahani)
- (Bangladesh) Subair Muhammed (Arambagh KS)
- (Bangladesh) Nur Hossain Ripon (Chittagong Abahani)
- (Bangladesh) Masud Alam (Chittagong Abahani)
- (Bangladesh) Khokon Chandra Das (Farashganj SC)
- (Nigeria) Amadi Moses (Farashganj SC)
- (Bangladesh) Polash Mojumder (Feni Soccer Club)
- (Bangladesh) Maruf Ahmed (Muktijoddha Sangsad KC)
- (Cameroon) Stephan Loga Bouga (Sheikh Jamal DC)
- (Bangladesh) MD Mamun (Arambagh KS)
- (Bangladesh) Zahid Parvez Chowdhury (Muktijoddha Sangsad KC)
- (Nigeria) Femi Orunnimi (Sheikh Jamal DC)
- (Bangladesh) A. M. Arafat (Dhaka Abahani)
- (Bangladesh) Shankar Das (Chittagong Abahani)
- (Bangladesh) Md Jamal (Rahmatganj MFS)
- (Uganda) Dominic Kabuye (Feni Soccer Club)
- (Nigeria) Paul Emmanuel (Muktijoddha Sangsad KC)
- (Ghana) Samad Yousiff (Dhaka Abahani)
- (Bangladesh) Atiqur Rahman Meshu (Sheikh Jamal DC)
- (Nigeria) Nadi Victor (Dhaka Mohammedan)
- (Bangladesh) Shahedul Alam (Dhaka Mohammedan)
- (Bangladesh) Arman Aziz (Muktijoddha Sangsad KC)
- (Bangladesh) Sohel Rana (Feni Soccer Club)
- (Bangladesh) Jahangir Alam Minto (Chittagong Mohammedan)

1 own goal

- (Bangladesh) Md Rony (Farashganj SC)
- (Bangladesh) Nasirul Islam Nasir (Sheikh Jamal DC)

=== Hat-tricks ===
Player	For	Against	Result	Date	Ref
(Bangladesh) Mithun Chowdhury	Muktijoddha Sangsad KC	Farashganj SC	5–0	1 March 2011	
(Nigeria) Abakporo Rowland	Feni Soccer Club	Chittagong Mohammedan	3–0	29 April 2011	
(Guinea) Ismael Bangoura	Arambagh KS	Rahmatganj MFS	4–0	30 April 2011	
(South Sudan) James Moga _{4}	Muktijoddha Sangsad KC	Brothers Union	4–1	2 May 2011	
(Ghana) Twum Frank	Dhaka Abahani	Farashganj SC	4–2	10 May 2011	
(Nigeria) Sunday Chizoba	Dhaka Mohammedan	Rahmatganj MFS	3–1	13 May 2011	
(Nigeria) Sunday Chizoba	Dhaka Mohammedan	Feni Soccer Club	3–2	4 June 2011	
(Cameroon) Stephan Loga Bouga	Sheikh Jamal DC	Rahmatganj MFS	5–2	11 June 2011	
(Liberia) Benjamin Cooper	Arambagh KS	Chittagong Abahani	4–0	15 June 2011	
(Russia) Eduard Sakhnevich	Sheikh Russel KC	Chittagong Abahani	5–0	24 June 2011	
(Guinea) Ismael Bangoura	Arambagh KS	Chittagong Mohammedan	3–2	25 June 2011	
