= Shahedul Alam Shahed =

Bangladeshi association football player

Shahedul Alam
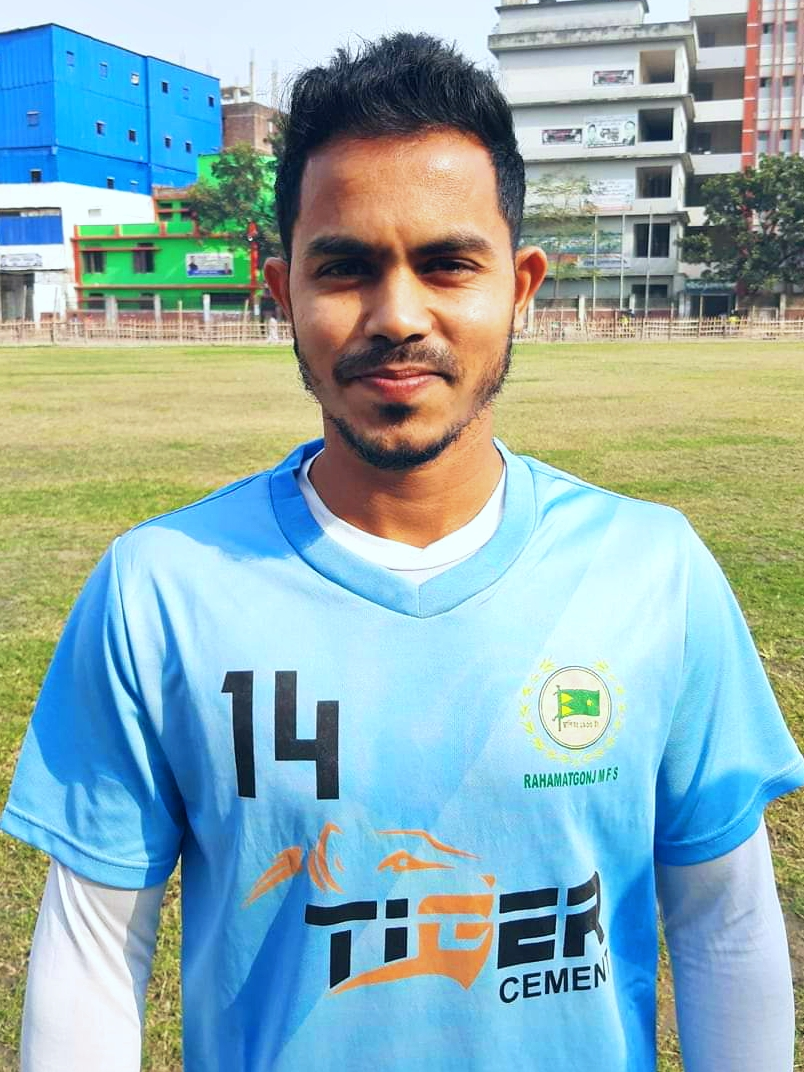
- Shahedul in 2020

Personal information
- Full name: Mohammad Shahedul Alam Shahed
- Date of birth: 1 July 1993 (age 33)
- Place of birth: Chittagong, Bangladesh
- Height: 1.60 m (5 ft 3 in)
- Position: Midfielder

Senior career*
Years	Team	Apps	(Gls)
2008–2009	Chittagong Mohammedan		
2009–2010	Feni SC		
2010–2013	Sheikh Jamal DC		
2013–2017	Dhaka Abahani		
2017–2019	Sheikh Russel KC	13	(1)
2019–2021	Rahmatganj MFS	23	(0)
2021–2022	Bangladesh Police	12	(0)

International career^{‡}
2010	Bangladesh U19	3	(0)
2012	Bangladesh U23	2	(0)
2011–2016	Bangladesh	4	(1)
- * Club domestic league appearances and goals as of 22 June 2022 ‡ National team caps and goals as of 2 June, 2106

Shahedul Alam Shahed (Bengali: শাহেদুল আলম শাহেদ) is a Bangladeshi footballer who plays as a defensive midfielder. He represented the Bangladesh national team from 2011 to 2016.

He previously represented Bangladesh Police in the country's professional football league, the Bangladesh Premier League.

== Club career ==
Shahed was an integral part of Feni SC during their 2009 Bashundhara Club Cup Championship campaign. He scored in the semi-final during a 3–2 victory over Moeen Smriti Sangsad. In the final, although Feni lost to Narayanganj Suktara Sangsad, the club was promoted to the professional league as runners-up and Shahed was adjudged the best player of the final.

== International career ==
On 2 December 2011, Shahed made his Bangladesh national team debut against Pakistan during the 2011 SAFF Championship. On 6 December 2011, Shahed scored his first international goal in a 1–3 defeat to Maldives which saw Bangladesh crash out of the tournament.

== Career statistics ==
=== International ===
As of 2 June 2016

Appearances and goals by national team, year and competition
Team	Year	Matches	Goals
Bangladesh	2011	2	1
Bangladesh	2016	2	0
Bangladesh	Total	4	1

=== International goals ===
Scores and results list Bangladesh's goal tally first.

==== Bangladesh ====
#	Date	Venue	Opponent	Score	Result	Competition
1.	6 December 2011	Jawaharlal Nehru Stadium, New Delhi	Maldives	1–2	1–3	2011 SAFF Championship

== Honours ==
Sheikh Jamal Dhanmondi Club

- Bangladesh Premier League: 2010–11
- Federation Cup: 2011–12
- Pokhara Cup: 2011

Abahani Limited Dhaka

- Bangladesh Premier League: 2016
- Federation Cup: 2016
