= Mohamed Mintu Sheikh =

Bangladeshi footballer

Mintu Sheikh
Personal information
- Full name: Mohamed Mintu Sheikh
- Date of birth: 3 December 1989 (age 36)
- Place of birth: Magura, Bangladesh
- Height: 1.78 m (5 ft 10 in)
- Position: Defender

Senior career*
Years	Team	Apps	(Gls)
2009–2010	Feni SC		(1)
2010–2011	Sheikh Jamal DC		(0)
2012–2015	Mohammedan SC		(0)
2016–2017	Sheikh Russel KC		(1)
2017–2019	Mohammedan SC	18	(1)

International career^{‡}
2010–2011	Bangladesh U23	10	(0)
2010–2012	Bangladesh	6	(0)
Medal record
Representing Bangladesh U-23
South Asian Games
Gold medal – first place	2010
- * Club domestic league appearances and goals as of November 21, 2012 ‡ National team caps and goals as of 12:58, 19 December 2020 (UTC)

Mohamed Mintu Sheikh (Bengali: মোহাম্মদ মিন্টু শেখ; born 3 December 1989) is a retired Bangladeshi footballer who played for the Bangladesh national team between 2010 and 2012.

== Club career ==
Mintu made his top tier debut with Feni Soccer Club in 2009. His performances on the international stage resulted in a competition between Abahani Limited Dhaka and Sheikh Jamal Dhanmondi Club to earn Mintu's signature. Eventually, both clubs named Mintu in their team for the 2012 league season, leading to Abahani sending a complaint to the Bangladesh Football Federation. They soon withdrew the complaint and Mintu went onto join Sheikh Jamal.

The following year, Mintu signed for Mohammedan SC and in 2013, he scored the winning penalty against Sheikh Russel KC, as Mohammedan won the Bangladesh Super Cup. He became the historic teams captain in 2018.

== International career ==
Mintu was one of the main architects of the Bangladesh U23 team's gold win at the 2010 South Asian Games, held in Dhaka. He made his debut for the senior team the same year, on 16 February, in a 2–1 victory over Tajikistan in the 2014 AFC Challenge Cup qualifiers held at the Sugathadasa Stadium.

== Personal life ==
On 19 November 2018, Mintu was arrested, however, had soon been granted bail in a case under Dowry Prevention Act in Bangladesh.

== Honours ==
Sheikh Jamal Dhanmondi

- Bangladesh Premier League: 2010–11

Mohammedan

- Super Cup: 2013

Bangladesh U23

- South Asian Games Gold medal: 2010
