= Landing Darboe =

Gambian footballer (born 1987)

Personal information
- Date of birth: 17 August 1987 (age 39)
- Place of birth: Gambia
- Position: Midfielder

Senior career*
Years	Team	Apps	(Gls)
–2013	Gambia Armed Forces FC		
2013–2014	Feni SC		
2014–2017	Sheikh Jamal Dhanmondi Club		
2017–2018	Abahani Limited Dhaka		
2018–2019	Mohammedan SC		
2019	Rahmatganj MFS		
2020	Uttar Baridhara Club		
- * Club domestic league appearances and goals

Landing Darboe (born 17 August 1987) is a Gambian former footballer who played as a midfielder.

== Career ==
In 2013, Darboe signed for Bangladeshi side Feni SC. He was regarded as one of the club's most important players. one of the most significant foreign players to have played in Bangladesh. He has been described as "of the greatest players to come out of The Gambia without getting a deserved recognition" and "one of the most consistent attacking midfielders in the Bangladesh Premier League".

== Style of play ==
Darboe mainly operated as a midfielder. He was known for his shooting ability.

== Personal life ==
Darboe has four brothers. He has been nicknamed "Del Piero" after Italy international Alessandro Del Piero.
