= Faisal Mahmud =

Bangladeshi footballer

Personal information
- Full name: Faisal Mahmud
- Date of birth: 16 January 1983 (age 43)
- Place of birth: Khulna, Bangladesh
- Height: 1.80 m (5 ft 11 in)
- Positions: Centre midfielder; right-back

Senior career*
Years	Team	Apps	(Gls)
2002–2006	Mohammedan SC		
2007–2008	Brothers Union		
2009–2010	Beanibazar SC		
2011–2012	Brothers Union		
2012–2013	Sheikh Russel KC		
2013–2014	Brothers Union		(3)
2015–2016	Muktijoddha Sangsad		
2015	Mohammedan SC		
2016–2017	Dhaka Abahani		
2017–2018	Mohammedan SC	16	(1)
2018–2019	Sheikh Jamal DC	0	(0)
2019–2021	Brothers Union	14	(3)

International career^{‡}
2002–2006	Bangladesh U23		(1)
2003–2018	Bangladesh	11	(0)

Managerial career
- 2023: Brothers Union (caretaker)
- * Club domestic league appearances and goals as of 10 January 2020 ‡ National team caps and goals as of 15 October 2019

Faisal Mahmud is a Bangladeshi football coach and former player who currently serves as the trainer of Bangladesh Premier League club Brothers Union.
