= Mamunul Islam =

Bangladeshi footballer

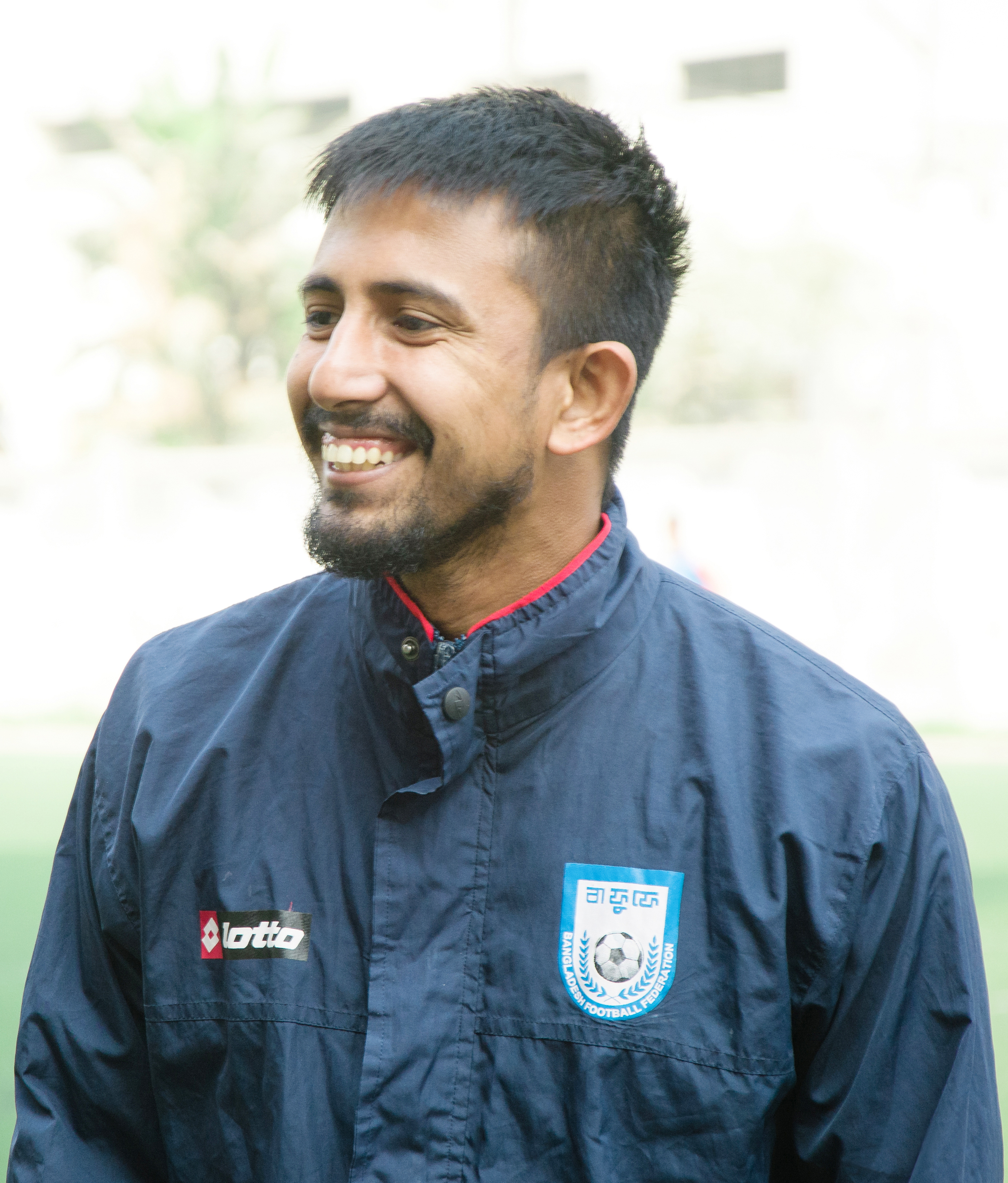
- Islam with Bangladesh in 2016

Personal information
- Full name: Md Mamunul Islam Mamun
- Date of birth: 12 December 1988 (age 37)
- Place of birth: Chittagong, Bangladesh
- Height: 1.67 m (5 ft 5 1/2 in)
- Position: Central midfielder

Team information
- Current team: Fortis
- Number: 8

Senior career*
Years	Team	Apps	(Gls)
2005–2008	Brothers Union	?	(1)
2008–2009	Dhaka Abahani	?	(2)
2009–2010	Mohammedan	22	(3)
2010–2011	Sheikh Jamal DC	?	(2)
2011–2012	Muktijoddha Sangsad	?	(1)
2012–2013	Sheikh Russel KC	?	(1)
2013–2015	Sheikh Jamal DC	?	(6)
2014	→ Atlético de Kolkata (loan)	0	(0)
2016–2018	Chittagong Abahani	?	(4)
2018–2021	Dhaka Abahani	35	(4)
2021–2022	Mohammedan	1	(0)
2022	Rahmatganj MFS	8	(0)
2022–2026	Fortis	19	(0)

International career^{‡}
2009–2014	Bangladesh U23	14 (Note: Includes six appearances as an overage player)	(2)
2008–2020	Bangladesh	67 (Note: Does not include the appearance against India U23 in the 2009 SAFF Championship on 11 December 2009)	(3)
Medal record
Representing Bangladesh
South Asian Games
Gold medal – first place	2010
- * Club domestic league appearances and goals as of 10 February 2024 ‡ National team caps and goals as of 24 January 2026

Mamunul Islam Mamun (Bengali: মামুনুল ইসলাম; born 12 December 1988) is a former Bangladeshi professional footballer who played as a midfielder for Bangladesh Football League club Fortis and also played for the Bangladesh national football team from 2009 to 2020 and was captain from 2013 to 2016.

He has won five league titles with three clubs. Mamunul started his career at Brothers Union as a central midfielder. After spending three seasons, he moved to Abahani Limited Dhaka in 2008–09 season and became league champion with Sky Blue Brigade. He joined Mohammedan SC Dhaka the following season. For the 2010–11 season, Mamunul moved to Sheikh Jamal Dhanmondi Club and won his second league title. Leaving Sheikh Jamal Dhanmondi Club after the 2011–12 season, he played the next season for Muktijoddha Sangsad KC. Then he joined Sheikh Russel KC and won his third league title. In the 2013–14 season, he returned to Sheikh Jamal Dhanmondi Club and won two more league titles in the 2013-14 and 2014–15 seasons. In the middle of this quest, Atletico de Kolkata signed Mamunul on loan from Sheikh Jamal Dhanmondi Club to play the inaugural season of Indian Super League. After returning to Sheikh Jamal Dhanmondi Club, later he joined his hometown club Chittagong Abahani Limited for a record transfer fee in 2016. After spending two seasons there, the midfielder returned to Abahani Limited Dhaka in 2018. On 6 September 2020, he announced his retirement from international football.

== Career ==
=== Brothers Union ===
Mamunul started his career in Brothers Union as a central midfielder in the 2005 season.

=== Abahani Limited Dhaka ===
Mamunul moved to Abahani Limited Dhaka in 2008–09 season and became the league champion in that season.

=== Mohammedan SC ===
After winning league title with Abahani he moved to their arch-rival Mohammedan SC in 2009–10 season and won Federation Cup and Super Cup with them.

=== Sheikh Jamal Dhanmondi Club ===
Mamunul moved to Sheikh Jamal Dhanmondi Club from Dhaka Mohammedan SC in 2010–11 season. In his first season with Sheikh Jamal DC he became the league champion.

=== Muktijoddha Sangsad KC ===
Mamunul played 2011–12 season for Muktijoddha Sangsad KC.

=== Sheikh Russel KC ===
Mamunul went to Sheikh Russel KC from Muktijoddha Sangsad KC. And won the league, Federation Cup and Independence Cup in 2012–13 season.

=== Sheikh Jamal Dhanmondi Club ===
2013–14 season Mamunul returned to Sheikh Jamal DC. The club became the league champion under Mamunul's captaincy. His success at the club continued as they went on to win the league again in 2014–15 season.

=== Atlético de Kolkata ===
Mamunul made his debut in the inaugural season of the Indian Super League, representing Atlético de Kolkata on a three-month loan from Sheikh Jamal Dhanmondi Club, becoming the only South Asian player outside India to secure a spot in the first season of the league. In 2014, he caught the attention of Indian football enthusiasts with a remarkable performance in the IFA Shield, where he led Sheikh Jamal Dhanmondi Club, one of the three foreign clubs participating in the tournament, all the way to the finals. Despite his promising talents, Mamunul did not receive an opportunity to start for Atlético de Kolkata in the ISL.

=== Chittagong Abahani Limited ===
Ending his stint at Sheikh Jamal DC Mamunul Islam joined his hometown club, Chittagong Abahani on a national record fee of taka 65 lakh. He played two seasons there. And he captained the team in his first season.

=== Abahani Limited Dhaka ===
After ten years at different clubs, Mamunul finally returned to Sky Blue Brigade in 2018.

=== Mohammedan SC ===
On 17 November 2021, Mamunul returned to Dhaka Mohammedan SC after 11 years.

=== Rahmatganj MFS ===
On 17 April 2022, Mamunul joined relegation fighting Rahmatganj MFS.

== Career statistics ==
=== International ===
Appearances and goals by national team and year
National team	Year	Apps	Goals
Bangladesh
Bangladesh	Year	Apps	Goals
Bangladesh	2008	7	1
Bangladesh	2009	6	1
Bangladesh	2010	3	0
Bangladesh	2011	8	0
Bangladesh	2012	3	0
Bangladesh	2013	5	0
Bangladesh	2014	3	0
Bangladesh	2015	15	0
Bangladesh	2016	5	1
Bangladesh	2018	6	0
Bangladesh	2019	3	0
Bangladesh	2020	3	0
Bangladesh	Total	67	3

=== International club goals ===
Sheikh Jamal Dhanmondi Club

#	Date	Venue	Opponent	Score	Result	Competition
1.	13 August 2015	Dolen Omurzakov Stadium, Bishkek	(Macau) Casa Benfica	2–1	4–1	2016 AFC Cup

Abahani Limited Dhaka

#	Date	Venue	Opponent	Score	Result	Competition
1.	15 May 2019	Bangabandhu National Stadium, Dhaka	(India) Chennaiyin FC	3–2	3–2	2019 AFC Cup
2.	19 June 2019	Bangabandhu National Stadium, Dhaka	(Nepal) Manang Marshyangdi Club	5–0	5–0	2019 AFC Cup

=== International goals ===
Olympic Team

#	Date	Venue	Opponent	Score	Result	Competition
1.	1 February 2010	Bangladesh Army Stadium	Nepal U-23	1–0	3–0	2010 South Asian Games
2.	15 September 2015	Incheon Munhak Stadium	Afghanistan U-23	1–0	1–0	2014 Asian Games

Senior Team

#	Date	Venue	Opponent	Score	Result	Competition
1.	6 June 2008	Sugathadasa Stadium	Afghanistan	2–2	2–2	2008 SAFF Championship
2.	30 April 2009	Bangabandhu National Stadium, Dhaka	Macau	1–0	3–0	2010 AFC Challenge Cup qualification
3.	10 October 2016	Changlimithang Stadium, Thimphu	Bhutan	1–2	1–3	2019 AFC Asian Cup qualification – play-off round

== Honours ==
Brothers Union

- Dhaka Premier Division League: 2005
- Federation Cup: 2005

Abahani Limited

- Bangladesh Football League: 2008–09
- Federation Cup: 2018

Mohammedan Sporting Club

- Federation Cup: 2009
- Super Cup: 2009

Sheikh Russel KC

- Bangladesh Football League: 2012–13
- Federation Cup:2012
- Independence Cup: 2012–13

Sheikh Jamal Dhanmondi Club

- Bangladesh Football League: 2010–11, 2013–14, 2014–15
- Federation Cup: 2013–14, 2014–15

Chittagong Abahani Limited

- Independence Cup: 2016

Atlético de Kolkata

- Indian Super League: 2014

Bangladesh U-23

- South Asian Games Gold medal: 2010
