= Wahed Ahmed =

Bangladeshi footballer

Personal information
- Full name: Wahed Ahmed
- Date of birth: 3 December 1993 (age 32)
- Place of birth: Sylhet, Bangladesh
- Height: 1.78 m (5 ft 10 in)
- Position: Striker

Youth career
- 2006: Mohammedan SC

Senior career*
Years	Team	Apps	(Gls)
2007–10	Fakirerpool YMC		
2010–12	Sheikh Russel KC		(3)
2012–14	Mohammedan SC		(19)
2014–16	Dhaka Abahani		(3)

International career
2014	Bangladesh U23	6	(1)
2013–15	Bangladesh	5	(0)
- * Club domestic league appearances and goals

Wahed Ahmed (Bengali: ওয়াহেদ আহমেদ; born 3 December 1993) is a retired Bangladeshi professional footballer who played as a striker.

== Club career ==
=== Fakirerpool YMC ===
Wahed began his career with the junior team of Mohammedan SC, before moving to Fakirerpool Young Men's Club in the Dhaka Senior Division League. With Fakirerpool, he won the Senior Division in 2007–08 and again in 2010, the latter season as the league's top scorer.

=== Sheikh Russel KC ===
Wahed made his Bangladesh Premier League debut with Sheikh Russel KC in 2010. On 28 February 2011, he scored his first top-flight goal against Mohammedan in a 1–0 victory.

=== Mohammedan SC ===
In 2012, he joined Mohammedan SC. With the Black and Whites, he was the second top scorer among local players in 2013–14 Bangladesh Premier League with 15 goals. In the 2013 Super Cup he scored 3 goals and became the joint top scorer along with Sheikh Russel KC's Jahid Hasan Ameli and Brothers Union's Jewel Rana.

He scored 15 goals in the 2013–14 Bangladesh Premier League which was the highest among local players.

=== Retirement ===
In 2017, Wahed retired from professional football to help run his family business.

== International career ==
On 31 August 2013, Wahed made his senior international debut against Nepal in the 2013 SAFF Championship.

== Club statistics ==
=== International ===
As of 30 May 2015.

Bangladesh national team
Year	Apps	Goals
2013	2	0
2014	2	0
2015	1	0
Total	5	0

==== International goals ====
Olympic Team

#	Date	Venue	Opponent	Score	Result	Competition
1.	10 September 2014	Incheon Munhak Stadium	Vietnam	1–3	2–4	International Friendly

== Honours ==
Fakirerpool YMC

- Dhaka Senior Division League: 2007–08

Mohammedan SC

- Super Cup: 2013

Abahani Limited Dhaka

- Bangladesh Premier League: 2016
