= Oladipupo Babalola =

Nigerian footballer (born 1968)

Ladi Babalola
Personal information
- Full name: Oladipupo Babalola
- Date of birth: 4 August 1968 (age 58)
- Place of birth: Lagos, Nigeria
- Height: 5 ft 10 in (1.78 m)
- Positions: Centre back; defensive midfielder

Youth career
- Attack F.C.

Senior career*
Years	Team	Apps	(Gls)
1983	Nigeria Airways		
1984–1994	Julius Berger		
1994–1995	Concord F.C.		
1995–1996	Mohammedan		
1998	Mohammedan		
2000	Mohammedan		
2010	JS Hercules		

International career
1985–1990	Nigeria U20	3	

Managerial career
- 2010: OPS (youth)
- 2010: Oulun Tarmo
- 2010–2011: JS Hercules
- 2012–2013: Brothers Union
- 2014–2016: Feni SC
- * Club domestic league appearances and goals

Oladipupo "Ladi" Babalola (born 4 August 1968) is a retired Nigerian international footballer. He has three caps for Nigerian U-20 national team from FIFA U-20 World Cup played in Chile.

== Playing career ==
Babalola started his coaching career at Tervarit youth teams and JS Hercules in Finland. During his first season with Js Hercules he led the team to gain a promotion to Kolmonen, Finnish third division and in his second season his team finished on 6th place and thus secured a place in the third division also for next season.

He also represented Mohammedan SC of Bangladesh in the Dhaka Premier Division League.

== Coaching career ==
Ladi holds a UEFA certified coaching license.

In 2012 Babalola was appointed as a head coach of Bangladesh-based professional team Brothers Union.

In 2014–15, Babalola was appointed as the head coach of Bangladesh-based professional team Feni Soccer Club and remained with them until 2015–16.
