= Didarul Alam (footballer) =

Bangladeshi footballer

Personal information
- Full name: Didarul Alam
- Date of birth: 1 September 1988 (age 38)
- Place of birth: Ramu Upazila, Cox's Bazar District, Bangladesh
- Positions: Left midfielder; attacking midfielder

Senior career*
Years	Team	Apps	(Gls)
2007–2008	Fakirerpool YMC		
2008–2010	Brothers Union		
2010–2014	Team BJMC		
2014–2017	Rahmatganj MFS		
2017–2018	Dhaka Abahani	4	(0)
2018–2021	Sheikh Jamal DC	19	(0)

International career^{‡}
2016	Bangladesh	1	(0)
- * Club domestic league appearances and goals as of 4 February 2022 ‡ National team caps and goals as of 1 September 2016

Didarul Alam (Bengali: দিদারুল আলম; born 1 September 1988) is a retired Bangladeshi professional footballer who played as a midfielder. He last played for Sheikh Jamal Dhanmondi Club in the Bangladesh Premier League.

== Career statistics ==
=== International caps ===
No	Date	Venue	Opponent	Result	Competition
1	1 September 2016	Galolhu Rasmee Dhandu Stadium, Malé, Maldives	Maldives	0–5 (lost)	Friendly

== Honours ==
Fakirerpool YMC

- Dhaka Senior Division League: 2007–08

Abahani Limited Dhaka

- Bangladesh Premier League: 2017–18
- Federation Cup: 2017

Rahmatganj MFS

- Bangladesh Championship League: 2014
