= Ismael Bangoura (footballer, born 1985) =

Guinean footballer (born 1985)

Personal information
- Date of birth: 17 February 1985 (age 41)
- Place of birth: Guinea
- Position: Striker

Senior career*
Years	Team	Apps	(Gls)
–2007	AS Douanes		
2007–2008	CA Bizertin		
2008–2009	Asswehly SC		
2009–2011	Erbil SC		
2011–2014	Team BJMC		
2014–2017	Mohammedan SC		
2017	Rahmatganj MFS		
2017–2018	Team BJMC		
2019	NoFeL SC		
2020	Muktijoddha Sangsad		
- * Club domestic league appearances and goals

Ismael Bangoura (born 17 February 1985) is a Guinean former footballer who played as a striker.

== Early life ==
Bangoura was born in 1985 in Guinea. He has an older brother.

== Career ==
Bangoura was the top scorer of the 2012 Bangladesh Football Premier League with seventeen goals. In 2014, he signed for Bangladeshi side Mohammedan SC. He captained the club. He was regarded as one of the most significant foreign players to have played in Bangladesh.

== Personal life ==
Bangoura has been married. He can speak the Bengali language.
