= Chandpur Stadium =

Multi-purpose stadium in Chandpur, Bangladesh

Chandpur District Stadium
- Chandpur Stadium
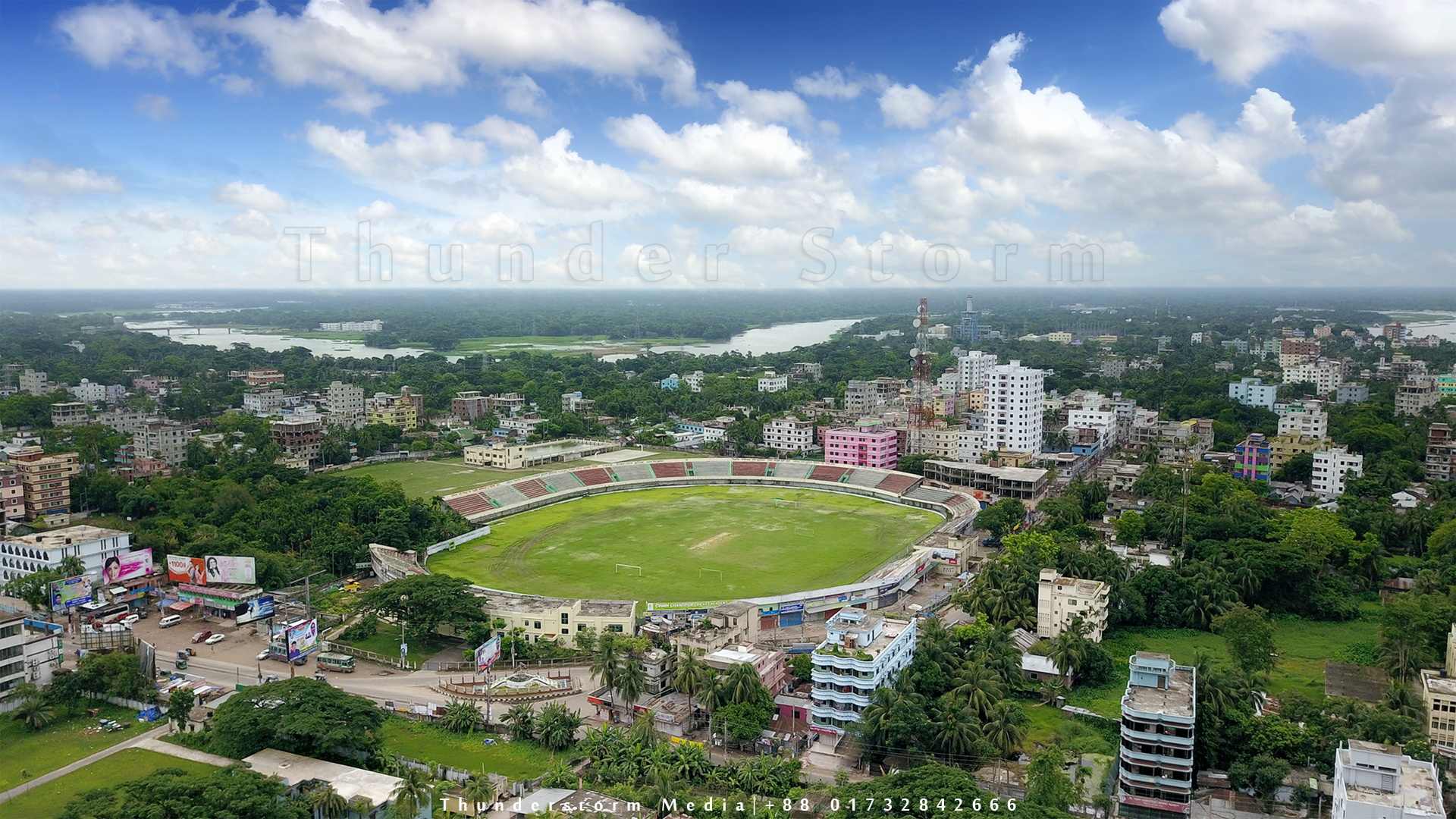
- Aerial view of stadium, 2017
- Interactive map of Chandpur District Stadium
- Location: Chandpur, Bangladesh
- Coordinates: 23°13′54.09″N 90°39′54.69″E
- Owner: National Sports Council
- Operator: National Sports Council
- Surface: Grass
- Field size: 175 × 135 m (574 × 443 ft)
- Field shape: Oval

Tenants
- Chandpur Cricket Team; Chandpur Football Team

Chandpur Stadium is a multi-purpose stadium in Chandpur, Bangladesh.

== See also ==
- Stadiums in Bangladesh
- List of cricket grounds in Bangladesh
