= Zahid Parvez Chowdhury =

Bangladeshi footballer

Zahid Parvez
Personal information
- Full name: Zahid Parvez Chowdhury
- Date of birth: 29 December 1987 (age 38)
- Place of birth: Hathazari, Chittagong, Bangladesh.
- Height: 1.63 m (5 ft 4 in)
- Position: Midfielder

Senior career*
Years	Team	Apps	(Gls)
2001–2002	Farashganj SC		
2002–2003	Arambagh KS		
2003	Chittagong Mohammedan		
2004–2010	Dhaka Abahani		(2)
2010–2011	Muktijoddha Sangsad		(1)
2011–2012	Dhaka Abahani		
2012–2013	Muktijoddha Sangsad		(1)
2013–2016	Dhaka Abahani		
2017–2019	Sheikh Jamal DC	14	(3)
2019–2021	Chittagong Abahani	0	(0)

International career
2003	Bangladesh U20		
2010	Bangladesh U23		
2006–2009	Bangladesh	13	(0)
Medal record
Representing Bangladesh U-23
South Asian Games
Gold medal – first place	2010
- * Club domestic league appearances and goals as of 14 January 2021

Zahid Parvez Chowdhury (Bengali: জাহিদ পারভেজ চৌধুরী) is a former Bangladeshi professional footballer who played as a midfielder or left winger. He is a former Bangladesh national team player.
