= 2017 Bangladesh Championship League =

Bangladesh Championship League
- Season: 2017
- Dates: 4 August 2017–4 November 2017
- Champions: Bashundhara Kings
- Promoted: Bashundhara Kings; NoFeL Sporting Club
- Relegated: Kawran Bazar Progoti Sangha
- Matches: 108
- Goals: 155 (1.44 per match)
- Top goalscorer: 12 goals (Bangladesh) Ariful Islam (NoFeL Sporting Club)

The Marcel Bangladesh Championship League 2017 was 6th season of the Bangladesh Championship League since its establishment. A total of 10 teams are competing in the league. The league has kicked off August 4, 2017 and come to end on November 4, 2017. Bashundhara Kings is the winner of this season.

== League standing ==
Rank	Teams	Played	Won	Lost	Drawn	Points	Qualification
1	Bashundhara Kings	18	10	3	5	35	Promoted to 2018–19 BPL
2	NoFeL	18	8	2	8	32	Promoted to 2018–19 BPL
3	Victoria SC	18	6	4	8	26	
4	Fakirerpool YMC	18	6	5	7	25	
5	T&T Club	18	5	3	10	25	
6	Uttar Baridhara SC	18	6	6	6	24	
7	Bangladesh Police	18	5	6	7	22	
8	Feni Soccer Club	18	4	6	8	20	
9	Agrani Bank	18	4	8	6	18	
10	Kawran Bazar PS	18	1	12	5	8	Demoted to 2018–19 Senior Division

== Venue ==
Other than Feni Soccer Club (having their own venue) and NoFeL Sporting Club, rest of the participating clubs is based in Dhaka. Therefore, BFF has decided to conduct all matches of the at Bir Sherestha Shaheed Shipahi Mostafa Kamal Stadium, Kamlapur, Dhaka.
