= Feni SC =

Feni soccer club ফেনী সকার ক্লাব
- Full name: Feni Soccer Club ফেনী সকার ক্লাব
- Nicknames: Feni Soccer ফেনী সকার
- Founded: 1988; 38 years ago
- Dissolved: 2019
- Ground: Shahid Salam Stadium
- Capacity: 5,000
- Chairman: Tabith Awal
Home colours	Away colours

Feni Soccer Club (Bengali: ফেনী সকার ক্লাব) commonly referred to as Feni SC, was a Bangladeshi football club based in Feni. The club exited the professional football league, after suffering relegation from the Bangladesh Championship League, the second-tier, in 2018–19. With the further formation of NoFeL SC in the same district, the club was dissolved in 2019. The 5,000 capacity Shahid Salam Stadium was their home ground.

== History ==
Feni Soccer Club was established in Feni in 1988. Unlike most Bangladeshi professional football clubs, they were watched over and operated by a group of local businessmen: Tabith Awal, Nizam Uddin, Abdul Awal Mintoo, and Abdul Kuddus. The club won a record eleven Feni First Division Football League titles, along with many local tournaments in Feni.

Following the introduction of the National Football League in 2000, the club participated in the tournament on multiple occasions. During the 2005–06 edition, Feni were the winners of the Feni District Zone, defeating Kararchar KC 1–0 in the final.

After finishing runners-up to Narayanganj Suktara Sangsad in the 2009 Bashundhara Club Cup Championship Football, they were given entry to the country's professional top-tier football league, the Bangladesh Premier League from the 2009–10 season. In their debut season in the professional league, they finished in fourth place, their highest ever league standing Until their controversial relegation in 2016, Feni was the only club situated outside of Dhaka to have not tasted relegation from the top-tier professional league.

In 2008, Feni Soccer played in the Federation Cup for first time, and reached the semi-finals. The club also played the final of the 2014 Modhumoti Bank Independence Cup, coming out short in the penalty shoot out to Mohammedan SC. Feni's lineup in the final consisted of: Mohammad Nehal, Landing Darboe, Akramuzzaman Liton, Ramzan Ali Mollah, Mathews Mendy, Abu Sufian Jahid, Shahihnur Rahman Shahin, Azamal Hossain Biddyut, Akbar Hossain Ridon, Kabba Jobe and Chuka Charles.

In the 2015–16 Bangladesh Premier League, Feni SC were matched up with Uttar Baridhara SC for the relegation play-offs. However, both teams did not show up for the game, and as a result, the Bangladesh Football Federation relegated both teams from the top-flight. Feni was later fined Tk 5 lakh by the federation.

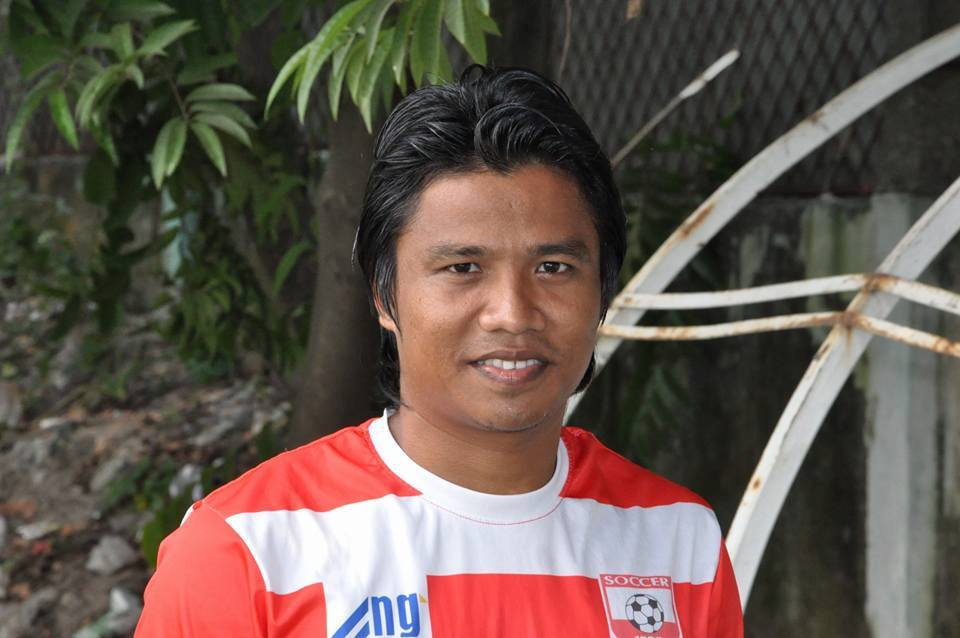
Choumrin Rakhaine was the club's top-scorer in the 2016 Bangladesh Premier League.

During their seven-years stay in the top-tier professional league, forward Akbor Hossain Ridon remained at the club as their longest-serving captain. Other notable players during their stint in the top-tier includes: Abu Sufian Jahid, Choumrin Rakhaine, Sohel Rana, Mohamed Mintu Sheikh, Shahedul Alam Shahed, Sushanto Tripura and Monjurur Rahman Manik.

In 2019, Feni Soccer Club was dissolved, ending their 31 years of football activities after facing relegation from the second-tier professional league, the Bangladesh Championship League in 2018–19. A couple of years before their disbandment, former Bangladesh Football Federation vice-president Tabith Awal along with Feni Soccer's football manager Sakhwat Hossain Bhuiyan Shaheen resigned from the club. They both again joined forces to establish NoFeL SC, a club representing Noakhali, Feni and Lakhsmipur.

== Season by season record ==
Record as Professional Football League member
Season	Division	League								Federation Cup	Independence Cup	Asian club competition		Top league scorer(s)	
Season	Division	P	W	D	L	GF	GA	Pts	Pos	Federation Cup	Independence Cup	Asian club competition		Player	Goals
2009/10	BPL	20	14	5	1	16	22	30	4th	Semi-final	–	–	–		
2010	BPL	22	4	9	9	22	30	21	9th	Group-stage	Quarter-final	–	–	(Nigeria) Abakporo Rowland	6
2011/12	BPL	20	5	4	11	15	32	19	9th	Group-stage	–	–	–	(Nigeria) Abakporo Rowland	8
2012/13	BPL	16	3	3	10	13	23	12	7th	Quarter-finals	Group-stage	–	–	(Lebanon) Anthony Pole Doe	4
2013/14	BPL	27	2	12	13	30	48	18	9th	Quarter-finals	Runners-up	–	–	(Nigeria) Chuka Charles	6
2014/15	BPL	20	5	3	12	26	42	18	8th	Quarter-finals	–	–	–	(The Gambia) Momodou Lamin Jatta	5
2015–16	BPL	22	4	6	12	21	35	18	11th	Group-stage	Group-stage	–	–	(Bangladesh) Choumrin Rakhain	6
2017	BCL	18	4	6	8	13	18	20	8th	–	–	–	–		
2018–19	BCL	20	5	4	11	16	27	19	10th	–	–	–	–		

== Honours ==
=== Senior ===
- Independence Cup
  - Runners-up (1): 2013–14
- Bashundhara Club Cup Championship
  - Runners-up (1): 2009

=== Youth ===
- Sailor-BFF U-15 National Football Championship
  - Runners-up (1): 2015
