= Bangladesh Football League =

Bangladeshi association football league

- Organising bodies: Bangladesh Football Federation (BFF)
- Founded: 2 March 2007; 19 years ago
- Country: Bangladesh
- Confederation: AFC
- Number of clubs: 13
- Level on pyramid: 1
- Relegation to: Bangladesh Championship League
- Domestic cup(s): Super Cup; Challenge Cup; Federation Cup; Independence Cup
- International cup: AFC Challenge League
- Current champions: Bashundhara Kings (6th title) (2025–26)
- Most championships: Dhaka Abahani; Bashundhara Kings (6 title each)
- Most appearances: (Bangladesh) Nasiruddin Chowdhury (225+)
- Top scorer: (Nigeria) Sunday Chizoba (132)
- Broadcaster: T Sports
- Current: 2026–27 Bangladesh Football League

The Bangladesh Football League (BFL) (Bengali: বাংলাদেশ ফুটবল লিগ) is the top tier of the Bangladeshi football league system. It is run by the Bangladesh Football Federation (BFF). The Dhaka derby between Dhaka Abahani and Mohammedan is one of the league's most popular matches.

The BFL superseded the Dhaka Premier Division League, which had functioned as the top tier from 1948 to 2006. The league name was changed from Bangladesh Premier League to Bangladesh Football League in 2025 because the spelling clashed with the similarly named cricket league.

== History ==
=== Origins ===
Before the establishment of the professional football league, the semi-professional Dhaka Premier Division League functioned as Bangladesh's top-tier competition from 1993 onward. Prior to that, the Dhaka First Division League (relegated to second-tier status in 1993) was the country's highest level of football from 1948, following the partition of India and even before Bangladesh's independence. Historically, the Dhaka Football League consisted of three-tiers, with the Pioneer Football League introduced in 1981 as a fourth tier. A separate Fourth Division also briefly existed within the Dhaka League system between 1966 and 1969.

From 2000 to 2006, the Bangladesh Football Federation (BFF) operated the National Football League, the first nationwide open competition. However, despite its national scope, it was considered less prestigious than the regional Dhaka Premier Division League, which remained officially recognized as the top tier until 2007.

=== Professional league ===
Founded in 2007 as Bangladesh's first professional national football league, the Bangladesh Football League (BFL) was initially launched as the B.League. It was renamed the Bangladesh League in 2009 and rebranded as the Bangladesh Premier League (BPL) in 2012. In 2025, the competition adopted its current name.

The first league match took place on 2 March 2007 between Dhaka Abahani and Muktijoddha Sangsad KC at the National Stadium in Dhaka, ending in a goalless draw. The next day in Khulna, Prashanta Dey scored the first goal in the history of professional football in the country as Khulna Abahani blanked the capital side Rahmatganj MFS 2–0. On 27 March 2007, Alfaz Ahmed netted the first hat trick in B League history to give Muktijoddha a 4–1 win over Rahmatganj.

Dhaka Abahani has won the league a record six times since 2007. In the 2015–16 season, Dhaka Abahani also became the first team to win the professional league title with an unbeaten record. In the 2023–24 season, Bashundhara Kings became the first team to win five consecutive league titles.

The league was disrupted by the COVID-19 pandemic, and a limited program of matches was in place through 2021. On 12 February 2022, it was announced that the league would return to its normal home-and-away format.

== Structure ==
As of February 2025.

Level	Division	Class
1	Bangladesh Football League; 10 clubs (substituted off) teams relegated	Professional
2	Bangladesh Championship League; 10 clubs (substituted on) 2 teams promoted (substituted off) 2 teams relegated	Professional
3	Dhaka Senior Division League; 18 clubs (substituted on) 4 teams promoted (substituted off) 2 teams relegated	Semi-professional
4	Dhaka Second Division League; 15 clubs (substituted on) 2 teams promoted (substituted off) 2 teams relegated	Semi-professional
5	Dhaka Third Division League; 15 clubs (substituted on) 2 teams promoted (substituted off) 2 teams relegated	Semi-professional
6	Bangladesh Pioneer League; Unlimited number of clubs (substituted on) 4 teams promoted No relegation	Amateur

== Competition format ==
=== Competition ===
There are 10 clubs in the BFL as of the 2025–26 season. During the course of a season (from September to April), each club plays the others twice (a double round-robin system), once at their home stadium and once at that of their opponents, for 18 games. The winning team in a match shall be awarded 3 points, with the losing team receiving no points. If the match ends in a draw, each team shall receive 1 point. The number of goals scored and conceded by each team shall also be recorded.

At the end of the season, the ranking of teams shall be determined first by the total number of points won.

In situations where 2 teams are equal on points for the champion or bottom positions, a playoff shall be held. Both teams shall play one home and one away match. If the teams remain level on points after the second leg, extra time of two periods of 15 minutes each shall be played as part of the second-leg match. If still tied after extra time, kicks from the penalty mark shall determine the winner. The play-off match or matches shall be organized within 7 days of the last league match.

In situations where more than 2 teams are tied on points for the champion or bottom positions, their rankings shall be determined in the following order:

- Greater number of points obtained in league matches between the tied teams;
- Goal difference from league matches between the tied teams;
- Greater number of goals scored in league matches between the tied teams;
- Goal difference in all league matches;
- Fewer disciplinary points based on yellow and red cards (Yellow Card = 1 point; Two Yellows leading to Red = 2 points; Direct Red = 3 points; Yellow + Direct Red = 4 points);
- Toss of a coin.

For all other league positions, if teams are equal on points, ranking shall be determined first by goal difference (goals scored minus goals conceded in all matches). If still equal, the team with the greater number of goals scored shall rank higher. If still equal, the team with fewer disciplinary points (same card scoring system as above) shall rank higher. If still equal after all criteria, ranking shall be determined by a toss of a coin.

=== Promotion and relegation ===
A system of promotion and relegation has existed between the Bangladesh Football League and the Bangladesh Championship League since 2012. Each season, the two lowest-placed teams in the Bangladesh Football League are relegated to the second-tier professional league, the Championship League, while the top two teams from the Championship League are promoted to the top tier, only if they meet the BFF Club Licensing Regulations for the following season.

Before 2012, the winners of the Dhaka Senior Division League were expected to earn promotion to the professional league. However, Senior Division clubs were unable to obtain the necessary professional league licenses, which meant that promotion and relegation did not function consistently until the 2011–12 season. Notably, in 2009, the lone edition of the Bashundhara Club Cup Championship took place, with the champions and runners-up granted entry into the 2009–10 edition.

Relegation Summary

Edition	Participants	Relegated positions	Relegated 1	Relegated 2	Withdrew	Relegated to
2007	11	No relegation				
2008–09	11	11th	Khulna Abahani	None		Regional League
2009–10	13	12th & 13th	Narayanganj Suktara Sangsad	Beanibazar SC	None	Regional League
2010	12	11th & 12th	**Chittagong Mohammedan**	Chittagong Abahani	None	2011–12 BCL
2011–12	11	10th & 11th	Farashganj SC	Rahmatganj MFS	None	2013 BCL
2012–13	9	9th	Arambagh KS	None	**Cox City FC**	2014 BCL
2013–14	10	10th	Uttar Baridhara	None		2014–15 BCL
2014–15	11	11th	Farashganj SC	None		2015–16 BCL
2015–16	12	11th & 12th	Feni SC	Uttar Baridhara	None	2017 BCL
2017–18	12	12th	Farashganj SC	None	Fakirerpool YMC	2018–19 BCL
2018–19	13	13th	NoFeL SC	**Team BJMC**	None	2019–20 BCL
2019–20	13	Competition abandoned due to COVID-19 pandemic in Bangladesh				
2020–21	13	12th & 13th	Arambagh KS (Note: Arambagh KS was demoted to the Senior Division League for two years after their involvement in live betting, spot fixing, match manipulation, and online betting in three league matches.)	**Brothers Union**	None	2019–20 BCL
2021–22	12	11th & 12th	Uttar Baridhara (Note: Uttar Baridhara demoted to the Second Division League (eventually given entry to the Senior Division League) after their involvement in spot fixing, match manipulation, and online betting in two league matches.)	Swadhinata KS	None	2022–23 BCL
2022–23	11	10th & 11th	Muktijoddha Sangsad KC	AFC Uttara	**Saif SC**	2023–24 BCL
2023–24	10	No relegation				
2024–25	10	9th & 10th	Dhaka Wanderers	Chittagong Abahani	Sheikh Jamal DC & Sheikh Russel KC	2024–25 BCL
2025–26	10	9th & 10th	Arambagh KS	Fakirerpool YMC	None	2026–27 BCL

Bold indicates that the club withdrew from participating in the second tier the following season.

=== Player regulations ===
As of the 2025–26 season, each participating club is entitled to register a maximum of thirty-six players, including a minimum of three goalkeepers. Clubs may register up to five foreign players, with no more than three permitted on the pitch simultaneously. In addition, teams may register up to four SAARC players, all of whom are classified as local and eligible to play. The rules also require each club to include five age-level local players in its squad, with at least one mandated to appear in the starting eleven for every match. The season also saw the removal of the AFC player quota that had been implemented since 2018–19.

In both the 2023–24 season and the 2024–25 season, clubs were allowed to register up to a maximum of six foreign players. If a club registered more than five foreign players, then the sixth had to be from an Asian Football Confederation (AFC)-affiliated Member Association. Additionally, in the 2024–25 season, amidst political unrest, clubs were permitted to register a maximum of forty players, including foreign players. Between the 2018–19 and 2021–22 seasons, a maximum of four foreign players were allowed, with the fourth required to be from an AFC-affiliated Member Association. (Note: In the eventually abandoned 2019–20 season, clubs were allowed to register five foreign players, with the fifth required to come from an AFC-affiliated Member Association.)

In the 2010 season, the foreign quota was set at five players; however, after numerous national players were benched throughout the campaign, the Professional League Committee reduced the quota to four players from the 2011–12 season. The foreign quota was further reduced to three players from the 2014–15 season. In the 2015–16 season, clubs were allowed to register four foreign players, with three permitted on the pitch simultaneously. In the 2017–18 season, the quota was reduced back to three players; however, only two were eligible to play in a match at the same time.

== Clubs ==
=== Champions ===
Wins by seasons
Edition	Season	Champions	Runners–up	Third place	Ref.
1	2007	Dhaka Abahani	Dhaka Mohammedan	Muktijoddha Sangsad KC	
2	2008–09	Dhaka Abahani	Dhaka Mohammedan	Sheikh Russel KC	
3	2009–10	Dhaka Abahani	Dhaka Mohammedan	Sheikh Russel KC	
4	2010	Sheikh Jamal DC	Muktijoddha Sangsad KC	Sheikh Russel KC	
5	2011–12	Dhaka Abahani	Muktijoddha Sangsad KC	Dhaka Mohammedan	
6	2012–13	Sheikh Russel KC	Sheikh Jamal DC	Dhaka Abahani	
7	2013–14	Sheikh Jamal DC	Dhaka Abahani	Muktijoddha Sangsad KC	
8	2014–15	Sheikh Jamal DC	Sheikh Russel KC	Dhaka Mohammedan	
9	2015–16	Dhaka Abahani	Chittagong Abahani	Sheikh Russel KC	
10	2017–18	Dhaka Abahani	Sheikh Jamal DC	Chittagong Abahani	
11	2018–19	Bashundhara Kings	Dhaka Abahani	Sheikh Russel KC	
12	2019–20	Competition abandoned due to COVID-19 pandemic in Bangladesh			
13	2020–21	Bashundhara Kings	Sheikh Jamal DC	Dhaka Abahani	
14	2021–22	Bashundhara Kings	Dhaka Abahani	Saif SC	
15	2022–23	Bashundhara Kings	Dhaka Abahani	Bangladesh Police	
16	2023–24	Bashundhara Kings	Dhaka Mohammedan	Dhaka Abahani	
17	2024–25	Dhaka Mohammedan	Dhaka Abahani	Bashundhara Kings	
18	2025–26	Bashundhara Kings	Dhaka Abahani	Fortis FC	

Club	Winner	Runners–up	Winning seasons	Runners–up seasons
Dhaka Abahani	6	6	2007, 2008–09, 2009–10, 2011–12, 2015–16, 2017–18	2013–14, 2018–19, 2021–22, 2022–23, 2024–25, 2025–26
Bashundhara Kings	6		2018–19, 2020–21, 2021–22, 2022–23, 2023–24, 2025–26	
Sheikh Jamal DC	3	3	2010–11, 2013–14, 2014–15	2012–13, 2017–18, 2020–21
Mohammedan SC	1	4	2024–25	2007, 2008–09, 2009–10, 2023–24
Sheikh Russel KC	1	1	2012–13	2014–15
Muktijoddha SKC		2		2010, 2011–12
Chittagong Abahani		1		2015–16

Italics indicate former champions of the Bangladesh Football League who are currently outside the competition.

=== 2026–27 season ===
The following 13 clubs will compete in the Bangladesh Football League during the 2026–27 season
Current clubs
Team	District	Stadium	Location	Capacity	Founded	Head coach	Team captain
Arambagh KS	Dhaka	Gopalganj Old Stadium	Gopalganj	5,000	1958		
Bangladesh Police FC	Dhaka	Shaheed Barkat Stadium	Gazipur	5,000		(Bangladesh) S. M. Asifuzzaman	(Bangladesh) Manik Hossain Molla
Bashundhara Kings	Dhaka	Bashundhara Kings Arena	Dhaka	6,000	2013	(Bangladesh) Bayazid Alam Zubair Nipu	(Bangladesh) Topu Barman
Brothers Union	Dhaka	Gopalganj Old Stadium	Gopalganj	5,000	1949	(Bangladesh) K.M. Zabid Hossain	(Bangladesh) Jamal Bhuyan
Dhaka Abahani	Dhaka	Shaheed Dhirendranath Datta Stadium	Comilla	18,000	1972	(Bangladesh) Maruful Haque	(Bangladesh) Assaduzzaman Bablu
Chattogram City	Chattogram	Munshiganj Stadium	Munshiganj	10,000	2010	(Chile) Julio Moreno Rayneld-Franco	(Bangladesh) Md Rasel Hossain
City Club	Dhaka	Shaheed Barkat Stadium	Gazipur	5,000	1972	(Bangladesh) Abdul Kayum Santu	(Bangladesh) Apu Ahmed
Dhaka Wanderers Club	Dhaka	Chandpur Stadium	Chandpur	10,000	1937		
Fakirerpool YMC	Dhaka	Chandpur Stadium	Chandpur	10,000	1960	(Bangladesh) Sawpan Kumar Das	(Bangladesh) Raficul Islam
Fortis FC	Dhaka	Shaheed Miraj–Tapan Stadium	Manikganj	5,000	2020	(Bangladesh) Masud Parvez Kaiser	(The Gambia) Pa Omar Babou
Dhaka Mohammedan	Dhaka	Shaheed Dhirendranath Datta Stadium	Comilla	18,000	1936	(Argentina) Fernando Santiago Varela	
PWD SC	Dhaka	Shaheed Miraj–Tapan Stadium	Manikganj	5,000	1954	(Bangladesh) Md Anwar Hossain	(Bangladesh) Sumon Kumar Das
Rahmatganj MFS	Dhaka	Munshiganj Stadium	Munshiganj	10,000	1933	(Bangladesh) Kamal Babu	

Locations of the 2025–26 Bangladesh Football League teams
Location of the club tents and stadiums

== All-time BFL table ==
The all-time BFL table is an overall record of all match results, points, and goals of every team that has played in BFL since its inception in 2007. The table is accurate to the end of the 2025–26 season. Teams in bold are part of the 2026–27 season. Numbers in bold are the record (highest either positive or negative) numbers in each column.

As of 6 September 2026

All-time table
Pos.	Club	Seasons	Pts	Pld	W	D	L	GF	GA	GD	1st	2nd	3rd	Debut	Since/Last App.	Relegated	Best
1	**Dhaka Abahani**	**18**	**782**	**363**	**233**	83	47	**729**	276	**+453**	**6**	**6**	3	2007	2025–26		**1**
2	**Dhaka Mohammedan**	**18**	615	363	169	**108**	86	611	370	+241	1	4	2	2007	2025–26		**1**
3	Sheikh Russel KC	16	537	327	150	87	90	497	349	+148	1	1	**5**	2007	2023–24		**1**
4	Sheikh Jamal DC	13	469	262	132	73	57	474	313	+161	3	3	0	2010	2023–24		**1**
5	Muktijoddha Sangsad	15	391	308	107	70	131	384	405	−21	0	2	2	2007	2022–23	1	2
6	**Bashundhara Kings**	8	368	150	115	23	12	364	113	+251	**6**	0	1	2018–19	2025–26		**1**
7	**Brothers Union**	16	365	320	89	98	133	394	494	−100	0	0	0	2007	2025–26	1	4
8	Chittagong Abahani	15	349	309	90	82	138	330	469	−139	0	1	1	2007	2024–25	2	2
9	**Rahmatganj MFS**	16	312	320	65	87	**157**	369	**556**	−187	0	0	0	2007	2025–26	1	4
10	**Arambagh KS**	12	235	237	59	58	120	236	377	−141	0	0	0	2007	2025–26	3	5
11	Saif SC	5	180	98	53	21	24	184	119	+65	0	0	1	2017–18	2021–22		3
12	**Bangladesh Police**	7	175	125	46	37	42	164	158	+6	0	0	1	2019–20	2025–26		3
13	Team BJMC	7	167	151	41	44	66	178	214	−36	0	0	0	2010	2018–19	1	4
14	Feni SC	7	136	151	30	46	75	143	232	−89	0	0	0	2009–10	2015–16	1	4
15	Farashganj SC	7	131	148	28	47	73	123	221	−98	0	0	0	2007	2017–18	**3**	6
16	**Fortis FC**	4	109	74	27	28	19	99	76	+23	0	0	1	2022–23	2025–26		3
17	Chittagong Mohammedan	4	99	86	24	27	35	81	116	−35	0	0	0	2007	2025–26	1	5
18	Uttar Baridhara	5	64	100	14	22	64	98	256	−158	0	0	0	2013–14	2021–22	**3**	10
19	Khulna Abahani	2	21	40	5	6	29	31	102	−71	0	0	0	2007	2008–09	1	9
20	NoFeL SC	1	20	24	5	5	14	23	42	−19	0	0	0	2018–19	2018–19	1	12
21	Narayanganj SS	1	20	24	4	8	12	12	35	−23	0	0	0	2009–10	2009–10	1	12
22	**Fakirerpool YMC**	2	29	36	8	5	23	36	98	−62	0	0	0	2024–25	2025–26		8
23	**PWD SC**	1	17	18	4	5	9	15	28	–13	0	0	0	2025–26	2025–26		8
24	Beanibazar SC	1	17	24	3	8	13	19	43	−24	0	0	0	2009–10	2009–10	1	13
25	Swadhinata KS	1	10	22	2	4	16	22	50	−28	0	0	0	2021–22	2021–22	1	12
26	**Dhaka Wanderers**	1	10	18	3	1	14	14	55	−41	0	0	0	2024–25	2024–25	1	9
27	AFC Uttara	1	5	20	0	5	15	10	56	−46	0	0	0	2022–23	2022–23	1	11
28	**Chattogram City**	0	0	0	0	0	0	0	0	0	0	0	0	2026–27	2026–27		
29	**City Club**	0	0	0	0	0	0	0	0	0	0	0	0	2026–27	2026–27		

League or status prior to the 2026–27 season:

2026–27 Bangladesh Football League teams
2026–27 Bangladesh Championship League teams
Dhaka Senior Division League teams
Currently inactive
Defunct clubs

== Statistics ==
=== Seasonal statistics ===
As of 23 May 2026

Season	Total Goals	Matches played	Average per Game
2007	273	110	2.48
2008–09	280	110	2.54
2009–10	391	156	2.50
2010	334	132	2.55
2011–12	295	110	2.68
2012–13	162	72	2.25
2013–14	382	135	2.82
2014–15	332	110	3.01
2015–16	342	132	2.59
2017–18	302	132	2.28
2018–19	439	156	2.81
~~2019–20~~	95	36	2.64
2020–21	472	156	3.03
2021–22	447	132	3.39
2022–23	324	110	2.95
2023–24	263	90	2.92
2024–25	282	90	3.13
2025–26	235	90	2.61

=== Head coaches ===
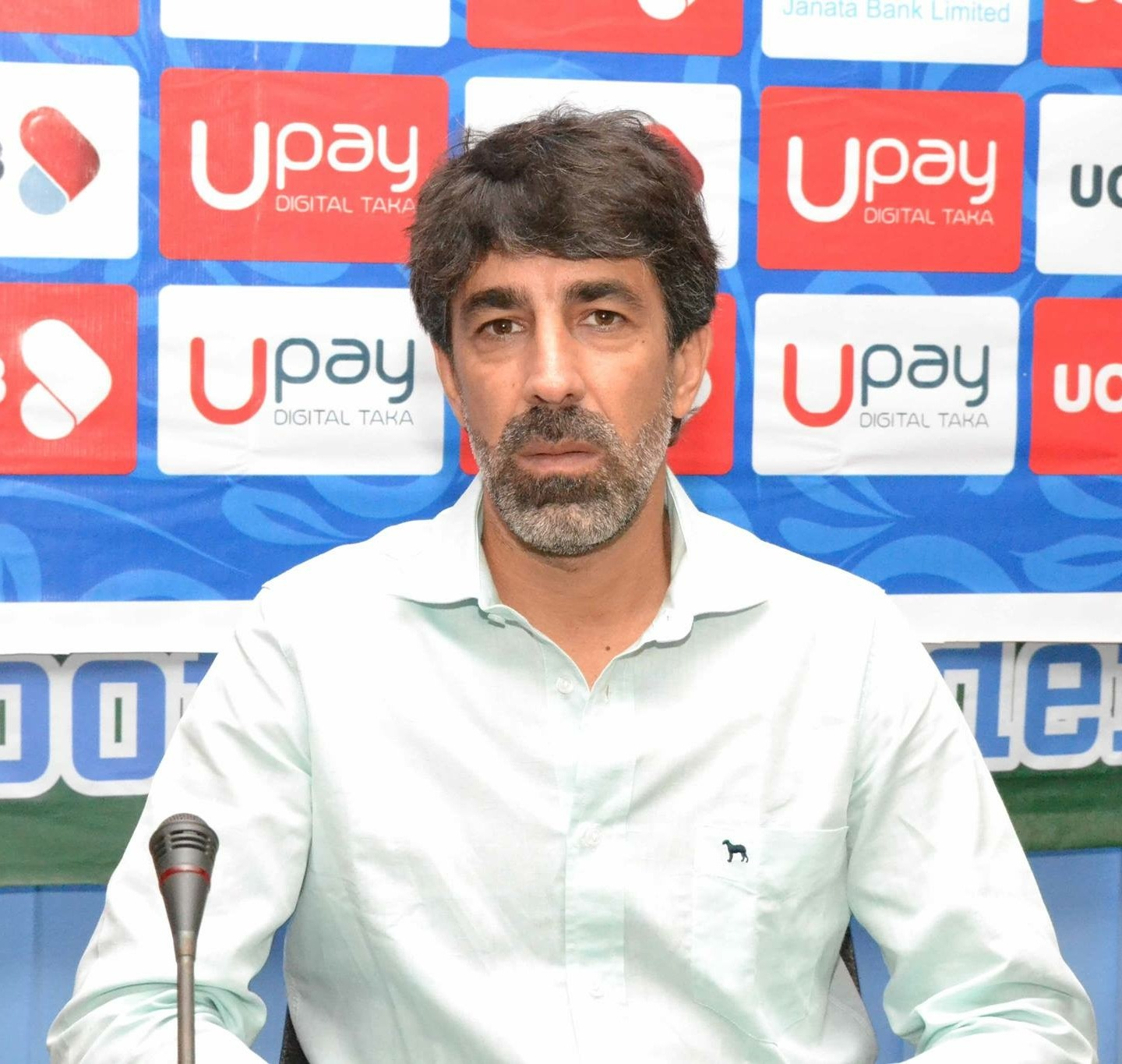
Óscar Bruzón is the most successful coach in Bangladesh Football League history with 5 league titles.

In terms of coaching performance, after the first 17 seasons of the BFL, Bangladeshi head coaches have won it 7 times, while foreign head coaches have won it 9 times, and one season was cancelled due to the COVID-19 pandemic. Pakir Ali of Sri Lanka was the first foreign head coach to win the BFL, while the second coach was Ali Akbar Pourmoslemi of Iran. Spaniard Óscar Bruzón has the most BFL championships at five and was the most recent foreign coach to win the title in the 2023–24 season.

Amalesh Sen was the first Bangladeshi coach to win the BFL in the league's opening season, and he has won BFL championships three times. Maruful Haque, Atiqur Rahman Atique, and Alfaz Ahmed are the only other Bangladeshi coaches to have won the Bangladesh Football League.

Winning head coaches
Head coach	Club(s)	Win(s)	Winning season(s)
(Spain) Óscar Bruzón	Bashundhara Kings	5	2018–19, 2020–21, 2021–22, 2022–23, 2023–24
(Bangladesh) Amalesh Sen	Dhaka Abahani	3	2007, 2008–09, 2009–10
(Bangladesh) Maruful Haque	Sheikh Russel KC; Sheikh Jamal DC	2	2012–13; 2013–14
(Sri Lanka) Pakir Ali	Sheikh Jamal DC	1	2010
(Iran) Ali Akbar Pourmoslemi	Dhaka Abahani	1	2011–12
(Nigeria) Joseph Afusi	Sheikh Jamal DC	1	2014–15
(Austria) György Kottán	Dhaka Abahani	1	2015–16
(Bangladesh) Atiqur Rahman Atiq	Dhaka Abahani	1	2017–18
(Bangladesh) Alfaz Ahmed	Dhaka Mohammedan	1	2024–25
(Bangladesh) Bayazid Alam Zubair Nipu	Bashundhara Kings	1	2025–26

=== Top scorers ===
As of 25 November 2025

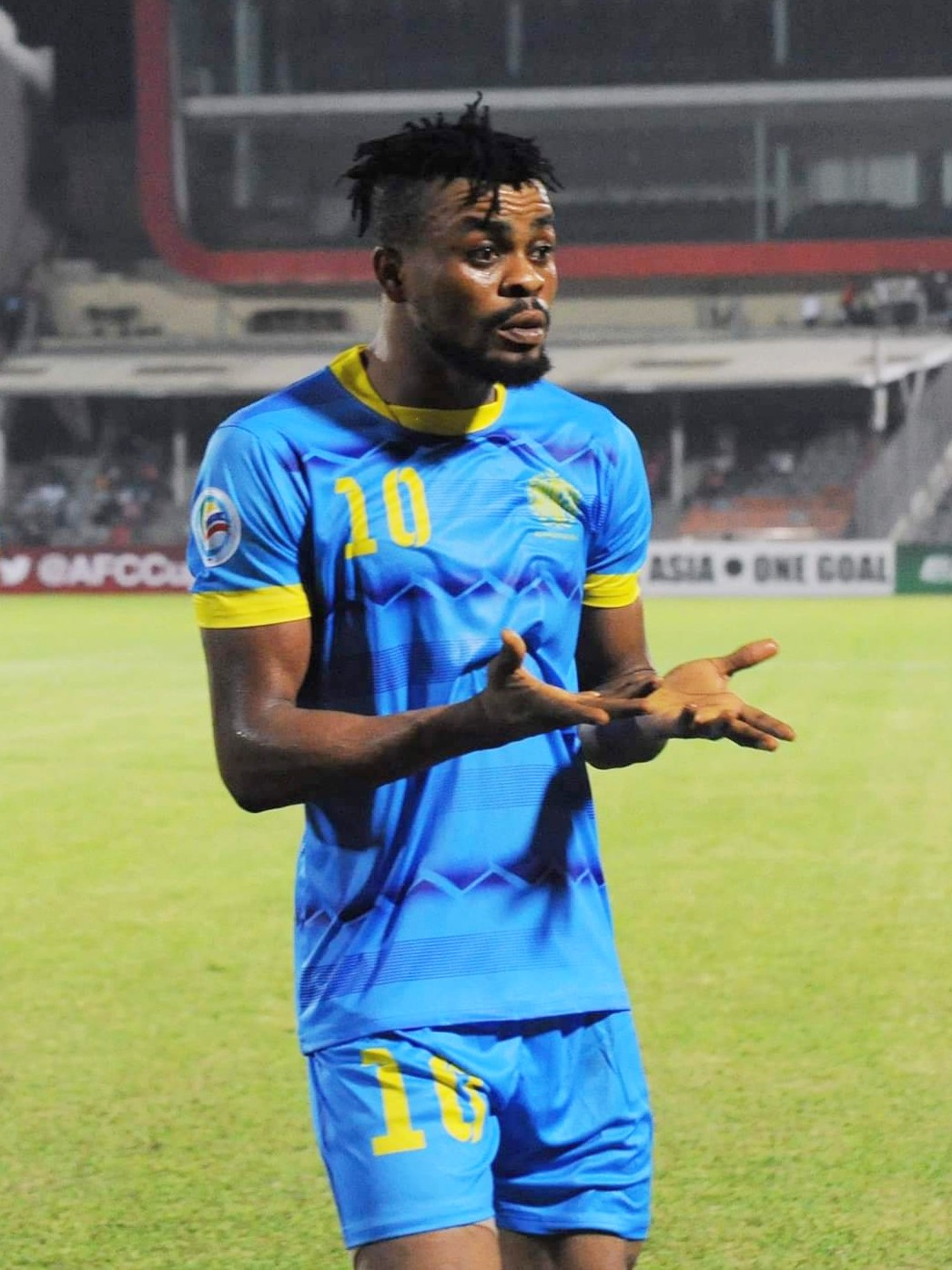
Sunday Chizoba is the top scorer in Bangladesh Football League history with 132 goals.

Bold indicates a player still active in the Bangladesh Football League. Italics indicate a player still active outside the Bangladesh Football League.

Rank	Player	Club(s)	Years active	Goals
1	(Nigeria) Sunday Chizoba	Dhaka Mohammedan (12), Muktijoddha Sangsad KC (30), Sheikh Jamal DC (7), Dhaka Abahani (71), Rahmatganj MFS (12)	2012–2014, 2015–2022	132
2	(Mali) **Souleymane Diabate**	Dhaka Mohammedan (96), Dhaka Abahani (1)	2018–present	97
3	(Bangladesh) Zahid Hasan Ameli	Dhaka Abahani (25), Dhaka Mohammedan (30), Sheikh Jamal DC (6), Sheikh Russel KC (12), Muktijoddha Sangsad KC (5), Chittagong Abahani (0), Brothers Union (0)	2007–2021	78
4	(Guinea) Ismael Bangoura	Team BJMC (39), Dhaka Mohammedan (21), Rahmatganj MFS (4), NoFeL SC (12), Muktijoddha Sangsad KC (0)	2011–2020	76
5	(Nigeria) Kingsley Chigozie	Brothers Union (39), Muktijoddha Sangsad KC (17), Sheikh Russel KC (3), Dhaka Mohammedan (13), Chittagong Abahani (3)	2010–2020	75

== Awards and records ==
=== Awards ===
Edition	Best Player	Club	Best Goalkeeper	Club	Young Player	Club	Best Coach	Club
2007	(Bangladesh) Zahid Hasan Ameli	Dhaka Abahani	None					
2018–19	(Costa Rica) Daniel Colindres	Bashundhara Kings	(Bangladesh) Ashraful Islam Rana	Sheikh Russel KC	(Bangladesh) Rabiul Hasan	Arambagh KS	None	
2020–21	(Brazil) Robson Robinho	Bashundhara Kings	(Bangladesh) Anisur Rahman Zico	Bashundhara Kings	(Bangladesh) Nihat Jaman Ucchash	Arambagh KS	None	
2023–24	(Bangladesh) Rakib Hossain	Bashundhara Kings	(Bangladesh) Ahsan Habib Bipu	Bangladesh Police FC	None			
2024–25	(Mali) Souleymane Diabate	Dhaka Mohammedan	(Bangladesh) Mitul Marma	Dhaka Abahani	None		(Bangladesh) Alfaz Ahmed	Dhaka Mohammedan

== Sponsorship ==
Period	Sponsor	Name	Notes	Ref.
2008–10	Citycell	Citycell B.League; Citycell Bangladesh League	Bangladesh Football Federation (BFF) signed a record three-year partnership deal with Citycell worth Tk 16.5 crores. Citycell was the co-sponsor for the Federation Cup, the B. League and the school football tournament across the country.	
2010–13	Grameenphone	Grameenphone Bangladesh Premier League		
2013–14	Nitol-Tata	Nitol-Tata Bangladesh Premier Football League	Nitol-Tata Group sponsored the Bangladesh Premier League after 35 matches into the ongoing league.	
2014–15	Manyavar	Manyavar Bangladesh Premier League	Besides Manyavar, KFC, Pragati Insurance, Amber Group and Treasurer had joined the country's professional football league as co-sponsors.	
2015–16	JB Group	JB Bangladesh Premier League	JB group had bought the title rights for Tk 4 crores.	
2016–18	Saif Power Battery	SAIF Power Battery Bangladesh Premier League	Saif Power Battery bought the title rights for Tk 1.5 crores.	
2018–22	TVS	TVS Bangladesh Premier League	BFF inked a one-year deal with TVS after finishing first leg of season.	
2023–25	Bashundhara Group	ABG Bashundhara Bangladesh Premier League		
2025–2026	United Group	United Healthcare Bangladesh Football League		
2026-present	BSRM (Bangladesh)	Bangladesh Football League Powered by BSRM		

== Media coverage ==
132 matches of season 2015–2016 were broadcast live at BTV World and Boishakhi TV; also live commentary was produced by Radio Next FM. Every match of this league has been streaming live on BFF's page of Mycujoo platform from 2018 to 2019 season. Bangla TV started broadcasting selected matches of the BPL 2018–19 matches live from 9 May 2019. The first sports channel of Bangladesh, T Sports, started to broadcast the matches of BPL 2020–21 from 13 January 2021.

== Stadiums ==
Home stadiums of current clubs (2026–27)
Abahani Limited	Arambagh KS	Bangladesh Police FC	Bashundhara Kings	Brothers Union
Shaheed Dhirendranath Stadium, Comilla	Gopalganj Old Stadium, Gopalganj	Shaheed Barkat Stadium, Gazipur	Bashundhara Kings Arena, Dhaka	Gopalganj Old Stadium, Gopalganj
Capacity: 18,000	Capacity: 5,000	Capacity: 5,000	Capacity: 6,000	Capacity: 5,000
Chattogram City	City Club	Dhaka Wanderers Club	Fakirerpool	
Munshiganj Stadium, Munshiganj	Shaheed Barkat Stadium, Gazipur	Chandpur Stadium, Chandpur	Chandpur Stadium, Chandpur	
Capacity: 10,000	Capacity: 5,000	Capacity: 10,000	Capacity: 10,000	
Fortis FC	Mohammedan SC	PWD SC	Rahmatganj MFS	
Shaheed Miraj–Tapan Stadium, Manikganj	Shaheed Dhirendranath Stadium, Comilla	Shaheed Miraj–Tapan Stadium, Manikganj	Munshiganj Stadium, Munshigonj	
Capacity: 5,000	Capacity: 18,000	Capacity: 5,000	Capacity: 10,000	

== BFL clubs in Asia ==
=== Continental qualification ===
Bangladesh Football League teams can qualify for the Asian club competitions – the AFC Challenge League qualifying play-offs – through their performance in the league. Before the 2012–13 season, Bangladeshi clubs were only allowed entry to the now-defunct AFC President's Cup, which was a competition targeted for emerging football nations. Since the 2021–22 season, the league winners are allowed entry to the qualifying play-offs of the AFC Champions League.

Dhaka Abahani was the first Bangladesh Football League club to play in Asian competition when they participated in the 2008 AFC President's Cup. The club qualified for the competition after winning the first edition of the league in 2007. The first six seasons of the league, Bangladeshi clubs only participated in the AFC President's Cup until Sheikh Russel KC, the winners of the 2012–13 league season, were given entry to the 2015 AFC Cup qualifying play-off. The winners of the 2013–14 season of the league, Sheikh Jamal Dhanmondi Club, were the first Football League club to be given direct entry into the AFC Cup, during the 2016 AFC Cup.

In July 2022, it was confirmed that Bashundhara Kings, the winners of the 2021–22 league season, will partake in the AFC Champions League Play-off round, while holding an automatic place in the AFC Cup group stages if they are unable to advance past the play-offs. Meanwhile, the runner-up of the league will take part in the qualifiers of the AFC Cup or will directly qualify for the competition if the league winners advance past the AFC Champions League play-offs. The league's third-place team, along with the Federation Cup champions, will remain on standby for the AFC Cup Play-off round if the league winners succeed in qualifying for the AFC Champions League main stage.

On 23 December 2022, it was announced that the AFC competition structure would change from the established formats from the 2024–25 season. A new third-tier tournament called the AFC Challenge League would be introduced. Later, the entry regulations document was ratified by the executive committee on 19 October 2023, and came into force immediately for the 2024–25 season. Bangladesh has been given only a play-off slot according to their club competitions ranking, and the champions of the 2023–24 season BFL, Bashundhara Kings, competed for the 2024–25 AFC Challenge League. The league's runner-up team, along with the Federation Cup champions, will remain on standby for the AFC Challenge League Play-off round if the league winners do not have an AFC Club Licence.

As of 17 September 2026

Ranking				Member association (L: League, C: Cup)	Club points								Total	Active teams (Note: Number of teams still active from association in AFC Champions League Elite, AFC Champions League Two or AFC Challenge League.)	2028–29 Competition Slot Allocation (direct+indirect)			
Region	2026–27	2025–26	Mvmt	Member association (L: League, C: Cup)	2018 (×0.3)	2019 (×0.4)	2021 (×0.5)	2022 (×0.6)	2023–24 (×0.7)	2024–25 (×0.8)	2025–26 (×0.9)	2026–27 (×1.0)	Total	Active teams	ACLE	ACL2	ACGL	Total
W14	25	26	+1	India (L, C)	4.417	3.217	3.677	4.797	3.453	6.500	1.338	2.183	18.333	2/2	0	0	0+1	1
W15	26	23	–3	Tajikistan (L, C)	4.433	3.000	4.970	2.493	2.230	3.276	5.774	1.600	17.489	2/2	0	0	0+1	1
W16	27	28	+1	Bangladesh (L, C)	1.433	6.933	2.790	3.760	4.730	1.500	2.433	2.100	15.655	1/2	0	0	0+1	1
W17	31	31	—	Syria (L, C)	2.000	3.133	1.785	2.890	1.400	2.500	1.000	1.650	10.010	2/2	0	0	0+1	1
W18	33	35	+2	Bhutan (L, C)	0.150	0.100	0.100	0.100	0.100	3.600	2.544	1.600	7.035	1/1	0	0	0+1	1

Indicates active associations which have teams still competing in the current season's ACL Two
Indicates active associations which have teams still competing in the current season's Challenge League.

=== BFL clubs in AFC tournament ===
BFL clubs performance in AFC competitions (2007–present)
BFL Season	Tier–1	Position	Tier–2	Position	Tier–3	Position
2007	—N/a	—N/a	—N/a	—N/a	Dhaka Abahani	Group stage (2008)
2008–09	—N/a	—N/a	—N/a	—N/a	Dhaka Abahani	Group stage (2009)
2009–10	—N/a	—N/a	—N/a	—N/a	Dhaka Abahani	Group stage (2010)
2009–10	—N/a	—N/a	—N/a	—N/a	Dhaka Abahani	Group stage (2011)
2010	—N/a	—N/a	—N/a	—N/a	Sheikh Jamal DC	Withdrew (2012)
2011–12	—N/a	—N/a	—N/a	—N/a	Dhaka Abahani	Group stage (2013)
2012–13	—N/a	—N/a	Sheikh Russel KC	Preliminary round (2015)	Sheikh Russel KC	Final stage (2014)
2013–14	—N/a	—N/a	Sheikh Jamal DC	Group stage (2016)	—N/a	—N/a
2014–15	—N/a	—N/a	Sheikh Russel KC (Note: Sheikh Russel KC, runners-up, replaced 2014–15 league champions, Sheikh Jamal DC, who withdrew.)	Qualifying round (2017)	—N/a	—N/a
2015–16	—N/a	—N/a	Dhaka Abahani	Group stage (2017)	—N/a	—N/a
2017–18	—N/a	—N/a	Dhaka Abahani	Group stage (2018)	—N/a	—N/a
2017–18	—N/a	—N/a	Saif SC (Note: Runners-up, Sheikh Jamal DC, and third-place, Chittagong Abahani, failed to obtain AFC club licenses; therefore, fourth-place, Saif SC qualified, having met the licensing requirements.)	Preliminary round (2018)	—N/a	—N/a
2018–19	—N/a	—N/a	Dhaka Abahani (Note: as Federation Cup winners)	Inter-zone semi-finals (2019)	—N/a	—N/a
2018–19	—N/a	—N/a	Bashundhara Kings	Cancelled (2020)	—N/a	—N/a
2018–19	—N/a	—N/a	Dhaka Abahani	Preliminary round 2 (2020)	—N/a	—N/a
2019–20 (Note: Due to the COVID-19 pandemic in Bangladesh, the 2019–20 Bangladesh Premier League was cancelled and declared null and void by the Bangladesh Football Federation. The teams from Bangladesh playing in the 2021 AFC Cup were determined by the results of the previous domestic season (2018–19 Bangladesh Premier League).)	—N/a	—N/a	Bashundhara Kings	Group stage (2021)	—N/a	—N/a
2019–20	—N/a	—N/a	Dhaka Abahani	Withdrew (2021)	—N/a	—N/a
2020–21	—N/a	—N/a	Bashundhara Kings	Group stage (2022)	—N/a	—N/a
2020–21	—N/a	—N/a	Dhaka Abahani (Note: Runners-up, Sheikh Jamal DC, failed to obtain an AFC license; therefore, third-place Dhaka Abahani qualified, having met the licensing requirements.)	Play-off round (2022)	—N/a	—N/a
2021–22	—N/a	—N/a	Bashundhara Kings	Group stage (2023–24)	—N/a	—N/a
2021–22	—N/a	—N/a	Dhaka Abahani	Play-off round (2023–24)	—N/a	—N/a
2022–23	Bashundhara Kings	Preliminary round (2023–24)	Bashundhara Kings	Group stage (2023–24)	—N/a	—N/a
2023–24	—N/a	—N/a	—N/a	—N/a	Bashundhara Kings	Group stage (2024–25)
2024–25	—N/a	—N/a	—N/a	—N/a	Dhaka Abahani (Note: Champions, Dhaka Mohammedan, failed to obtain an AFC license; therefore, runners-up, Dhaka Abahani, qualified, having met the licensing requirements.)	Preliminary stage (2025–26)
2024–25	—N/a	—N/a	—N/a	—N/a	Bashundhara Kings (Note: The indirect slot of one of the member associations that did not enter was redistributed to the next highest eligible member association.)	Group stage (2025–26)

== See also ==
- Bangladesh Women's Football League
- BFF U-18 Football League
- Dhaka derby
