= Shaheed Salam Stadium =

Football Stadium in Feni, Bangladesh

Shaheed Salam Stadium শহীদ সালাম স্টেডিয়াম
- Interactive map of Shaheed Salam Stadium শহীদ সালাম স্টেডিয়াম
- Location: Feni, Bangladesh
- Coordinates: 23°01′12.50″N 91°24′08.92″E
- Owner: National Sports Council
- Operator: National Sports Council
- Capacity: 5,000
- Surface: Grass
- Field size: 120 m x 80 m (Rectangular)

Bhasha Shaheed Abdus Salam Stadium (Bengali: ভাষা শহীদ আব্দুস সালাম স্টেডিয়াম) also known as Shaheed Salam Stadium is a football stadium in Feni, Bangladesh. The stadium is named to honor the 1952 Bengali language movement martyr, Abdus Salam. The stadium is a regular of host of national day parade, professional as well as district level football league matches. It most recently served as the home ground of Bangladesh Championship League team Feni Soccer Club during the 2017 league season.

== Hosting National Sporting Event ==
The venue was the zonal host of 5th National Football League from September 15–26 in 2005

== See also ==
- List of football stadiums in Bangladesh
- Sport in Bangladesh
- Football in Bangladesh
- Bangladesh national football team
- Bangladesh Football Federation
