= Sheikh Russel KC =

Association football club based in Dhaka

- Full name: Sheikh Russel Krira Chakra
- Founded: 1995; 31 years ago
- Ground: Bashundhara Kings Arena
- Capacity: 6,000
- President: Sayem Sobhan Anvir
- Head coach: Jugoslav Trenchovski
- League: Bangladesh Premier League
- 2023–24: BPL, 6th of 10
- Website: www.sheikhrussel.club
Home colours	Away colours

Sheikh Russel Krira Chakra (Bengali: শেখ রাসেল ক্রীড়া চক্র) is a professional football club based in Dhaka, Bangladesh. Founded in 1995, the club competed in the Bangladesh Premier League. They won Federation Cup in 2012, which is club's first major title. The club also won their maiden Bangladesh Premier League title in the season 2012–13. Sayem Sobhan Anvir, managing director of Bashundhara Group, is the chairman of Sheikh Russel KC. The club was based at the Sylhet District Stadium until 2021 when they moved to their present home venue, the Bashundhara Kings Arena.

== History ==
=== Emergence ===
Sheikh Russel Krira Chakra was established in 1995 and named after Sheikh Russel, son of former President of Bangladesh Sheikh Mujibur Rahman. The founder was Shahjahan Kabir, and striker Shofiqur Rahman Titu was appointed as the team's first ever captain in 1996. The club started its journey in 1996 with the Pioneer Football League. Then in 1998 the team became runners-up in the Dhaka Third Division and were promoted to the Dhaka Second Division, under the coaching of Wazed Gazi.

In 2002, Sheikh Russel KC became runners-up in the Dhaka First Division (second Tier). In their first appearance in top-flight football in 2003–04 season, Sheikh Russel stunned traditional powerhouses like Abahani, Mohammedan and Muktijoddha Sangsad to finish second in the top-tier at the time, the Premier Division Football League. Since then, despite playing in the country's first professional top-tier league, the Bangladesh Premier League regularly, Sheikh Russel did not get the expected success until the start of the next decade.

=== Treble win and drought ===
In the 2012–13 season, Sheikh Russel KC got its highest success by winning the domestic treble, under the guidance of local coach Maruful Haque. Sheikh Russel defeated Sheikh Jamal DC 2–1 in extra time of the Federation Cup final to win a title for the first time its history. They then went on to win the 2013 Independence Cup final, 3–2 against Sheikh Jamal. They completed the treble by again edging Sheikh Jamal DC, this time to the 2012–13 Bangladesh Premier League. The team captained by goalkeeper Biplob Bhattacharjee, only conceded 14 goals in league, while Haitian playmaker Sony Norde, was the lethal, scoring 16 league goals.

Since their treble winning season, the club has failed to win another trophy finishing runners-up in multiple tournaments and were also knocked out of the AFC Cup qualifiers twice. They were also defeated by Mohammedan SC in the 2013 Super Cup final. However, the team did manage to reach the semi-finals of the 2014 AFC President's Cup.

On 9 January 2015, the managing director of Bashundhara Group, Sayem Sobhan Anvir was appointed as the club's new chairman. He assured that the club would be back challenging for titles once more. However, the club's further investment all went in vain as they failed to produce results on the pitch the following seasons.

On 20 April 2017, Sheikh Russel KC were fined 2000 Swiss Francs by FIFA over contract disputes with a player and a coach.

=== Attempt to rebuild ===
In October 2018, veteran coach Saiful Bari Titu was appointed as the club's head coach. In 2020, Sheikh Russel were one of the four clubs from Bangladesh to attain AFC Cup licensing. Russel spent heavily the next three years signing several national team players alongside expensive foreign recruits, however, the club found themselves fighting for relegation, leading to Titu's dismissal after three and a half years of service to the club, in March 2022.

On 22 August 2024, Sheikh Jamal and Sheikh Russel withdrew from the BPL due to the withdrawal of their sponsor Bashundhara Group.

== Current squad ==
As of 29 March 2024

Note: Flags indicate national team as defined under FIFA eligibility rules; some limited exceptions apply. Players may hold more than one non-FIFA nationality.

No.	Pos.	Nation	Player
1	GK	BAN	Mitul Marma (captain)
2	DF	BAN	Shahin Ahammad
3	DF	BAN	Abid Ahmed
4	DF	BAN	Shawkat Russel
5	DF	NGA	Ganiu Ogungbe
6	MF	BAN	Emon Babu (vice-captain)
7	MF	BAN	Shahidul Islam Sumon
8	MF	JPN	Kodai Iida
13	DF	BAN	Ariful Islam Jitu
14	DF	BAN	Tanvir Hossain
15	DF	BAN	Jintu Mia
16	FW	BAN	Mohamed Munna
17	FW	BAN	Nihat Jaman Ucchash
18	FW	BAN	Ekbal Hussain

No.	Pos.	Nation	Player
19	FW	BAN	Sarower Zaman Nipu
20	FW	BAN	Sumon Reza
22	GK	BAN	Rakibul Islam Tushar
23	DF	BAN	Monir Alam
24	MF	BAN	Dipok Roy
26	MF	BAN	Chandon Roy (on loan from BFF Elite Academy)
27	DF	BAN	Apon Sarkar
29	GK	BAN	Mehedi Islam Rabbani
30	GK	BAN	Nayeem Mia
31	DF	BAN	Mohammad Sagor Miah
44	DF	UKR	Valeriy Stepanenko
45	FW	GUI	Sekou Sylla
67	MF	UZB	Akhror Umarjonov
95	MF	SRB	Vojislav Balabanovic

== Coaching staff ==
As of 7 November 2023

Position	Name
Head coach	(North Macedonia) Jugoslav Trenchovski
Team Manager	(Bangladesh) Shahedul Alam Shahed
Assistant manager	(Bangladesh) Md Ifthekar Rahman Khan
Team Leader	(Bangladesh) Md Fakhruddin
Trainer	(Bangladesh) Abdul Baten Komol
Goalkeeping coach	(Bangladesh) Masud Ahamad
Interpreter	(Bangladesh) Md Maruf Kazi
Physiotherapist	(Bangladesh) Nujaim Khan Pranto
Head of delegation	(Bangladesh) Md Habibur Rahman Khan
Masseur	(Bangladesh) Md Shamim

== Management ==
=== Board of directors ===
As of June 2022

Position	Name
Chairman	Sayem Sobhan Anvir
Vice-chairman	Naem Nizam Imdadul Haque Milon
Senior vice-chairman	Liaquat Ali Khan
Sporting director	Saleh Zaman Salim
Director in Charge	Ismat Jamil Akhond
Director of Finance	Md. Fakhruddin

== Team records ==
=== Head coach's record ===
As of 29 May 2024

Head Coach	Nat.	From	To	P	W	D	L	GS	GA	%W
Wazed Gazi	(Bangladesh)	18 January 2007	—	0	0	0	0	0	0	—
Kamal Babu	(Bangladesh)	27 August 2009	—	0	0	0	0	0	0	—
Mahmudul Haque Liton	(Bangladesh)	December 2010	June 2011	0	0	0	0	0	0	—
Maruful Haque	(Bangladesh)	September 2011	15 April 2014	73	45	12	16	130	61	61.64
Dragan Đukanović	(Montenegro)	21 April 2014	20 May 2015	40	16	10	14	60	44	40.00
Maruful Haque	(Bangladesh)	3 June 2015	26 August 2016	28	12	5	11	46	40	42.86
Shafiqul Islam Manik	(Bangladesh)	27 August 2016	3 February 2018	44	14	15	15	46	42	31.82
Saiful Bari Titu	(Bangladesh)	October 2018	13 March 2022	84	41	16	27	118	85	48.81
Zulfiker Mahmud Mintu	(Bangladesh)	14 March 2022	19 August 2023	45	21	12	12	80	61	46.67
Jugoslav Trenchovski	(North Macedonia)	20 August 2023	Present	23	5	7	11	23	32	21.74

== Kit manufacturers and shirt sponsors ==
Period	Kit manufacturer	Shirt sponsor
2018–present	Cosco	Bashundhara Cement

== Honours ==
=== Winners ===
- Bangladesh Premier League:

2012–13

- (Bangladesh) Federation Cup:

2012

- (Bangladesh) Independence Cup:

2012–13

- (Bangladesh) Dhaka Second Division League:

2001

- (Bangladesh) Pioneer League:

1996–97

=== Runners-up ===
- Bangladesh Premier League:

2014–15

- (Bangladesh) Dhaka Premier Division League:

2003–04

- (Bangladesh) Dhaka First Division League:

2002

- (Bangladesh) Dhaka Third Division League:

1997

- (Bangladesh) Super Cup

2012–13

- (Bangladesh) Independence Cup (2):

2011, 2018–19

== Performance in AFC competitions ==
Season	Competition	Round		Club	Score
2014	AFC President's Cup	Group stage	(Pakistan)	KRL	0–0
2014	AFC President's Cup	Group stage	(Sri Lanka)	Air Force	5–0
2014	AFC President's Cup	Group stage	(Bhutan)	Ugyen Academy	4–0
2014	AFC President's Cup	Final stage	(Mongolia)	Erchim	1–0
2014	AFC President's Cup	Final stage	(North Korea)	Rimyongsu	0–4
2015	AFC Cup	Preliminary stage	(Tajikistan)	Khayr Vahdat	0–1
2017	AFC Cup	Qualifying round	(Taiwan)	Tatung	1–1
2017	AFC Cup	Qualifying round	(Bhutan)	Terton	3–4

== Affiliated clubs ==
The following club is currently affiliated with Sheikh Russel KC:

- (India) East Bengal Club (2022–present)
