= 2020–21 Bangladesh Premier League (football) =

13th professional season of the top-flight football league in Bangladesh

Bangladesh Premier League
- Season: 2020–21
- Dates: 13 January – 20 September 2021
- Champions: Bashundhara Kings (2nd titles)
- Relegated: Arambagh KS; Brothers Union
- AFC Cup: Bashundhara Kings; Dhaka Abahani
- Matches: 156
- Goals: 472 (3.03 per match)
- Best Player: (Brazil) Robinho
- Top goalscorer: 21 goals (Brazil) Robinho
- Biggest home win: Sheikh Jamal Dhanmondi Club 6–0 Arambagh KS (27 January 2021)
- Biggest away win: Uttar Baridhara Club 0–8 Dhaka Abahani (26 August 2021)
- Highest scoring: Uttar Baridhara Club 4–4 Arambagh KS (20 February 2021)
- Longest winning run: 9 matches Bashundhara Kings
- Longest unbeaten run: 17 matches Bashundhara Kings
- Longest winless run: 15 matches Arambagh KS
- Longest losing run: 8 matches Arambagh KS

The 2020–21 Bangladesh Premier League, also known as the TVS Bangladesh Premier League for sponsorship reasons, was the 13th season of the Bangladesh Premier League since its establishment in 2007. A total of 13 football clubs are competing in the league. The country's top-flight football competition, Bangladesh Premier League 2020–21 season is kicked off on January 13 after 10 months.

The previous season was abandoned due to COVID-19 pandemic in Bangladesh. Bashundhara Kings are the defending champions as 2018–19 season winner.

== Teams ==
=== Changes ===
| Promoted from 2018–19 BCL | Relegated from 2018–19 BPL |
|---|---|
| Bangladesh Police FC; Uttar Baridhara Club | NoFeL SC; Team BJMC |

=== Stadiums and locations ===
Locations of the 2020–21 Bangladesh Premier League teams

| Team | Location | Stadium | Capacity |
|---|---|---|---|
| Arambagh KS | Munshigonj | Munshigonj Stadium | 10,000 |
| Bangladesh Police FC | Dhaka | Bangabandhu National Stadium | 36,000 |
| Bashundhara Kings | Comilla | Shaheed Dhirendranath Stadium | 18,000 |
| Brothers Union | Dhaka | Bangabandhu National Stadium | 36,000 |
| Chittagong Abahani Ltd. | Dhaka | Bangabandhu National Stadium | 36,000 |
| Dhaka Abahani Ltd. | Dhaka | Bangabandhu National Stadium | 36,000 |
| Dhaka Mohammedan SC Ltd. | Comilla | Shaheed Dhirendranath Stadium | 18,000 |
| Lt. Sheikh Jamal Dhanmondi Club Ltd. | Dhaka | Bangabandhu National Stadium | 36,000 |
| Muktijoddha Sangsad KC | Dhaka | Bangabandhu National Stadium | 36,000 |
| Rahmatganj MFS | Dhaka | Bangabandhu National Stadium | 36,000 |
| Saif Sporting Club | Dhaka | Bangabandhu National Stadium | 36,000 |
| Sheikh Russel KC | Dhaka | Bangabandhu National Stadium | 36,000 |
| Uttar Baridhara Club | Gazipur | Shaheed Ahsan Ullah Master Stadium | |

Brothers Union (BU): The Gopibagh-based outfit submitted their players' list two days after the deadline of the players' transfer, effectively violating the rules and losing their eligibility to stay in the top-flight football. Considering Brothers Union's contribution to the country's football, the players status committee of BFF decided to allow them to take part in the league.

=== Additional venues ===
Bangladesh Football Federation had stopped organizing matches outside the capital due to a nationwide lockdown due to the rapid rise in COVID-19 cases. From the twentieth round, Bir Sherestha Shaheed Shipahi Mostafa Kamal Stadium and from the twenty-first round, Bangladesh Army Stadium began to be used as the venue of the league to reduce the pressure on the Bangabandhu National Stadium.

=== Personnel and kits ===
| Team | Head coach | Captain | Kit manufacturer | Shirt sponsor (chest) |
|---|---|---|---|---|
| Arambagh KS | (Bangladesh) Sheikh Jahidur Rahman | (Bangladesh) Md Sayde | M Sports | Nilsagor Group |
| Bangladesh Police FC | (Sri Lanka) Pakir Ali | (Ivory Coast) Lancine Toure | | |
| Bashundhara Kings | (Spain) Óscar Bruzón | (Bangladesh) Topu Barman | Club manufactured kit | Bashundhara Group |
| Brothers Union | (Iran) Reza Parkas | (Bangladesh) Arup Kumar Baidya | | Biswas Builders Limited |
| Chittagong Abahani Limited | (Bangladesh) Maruful Haque | (Ivory Coast) Didier Brossou | Noor Enterprise | Ignite Battery |
| Dhaka Abahani Limited | (Portugal) Mário Lemos | (Bangladesh) Nabib Newaj Jibon | Graphics Bird | |
| Dhaka Mohammedan SC Limited | (England) Sean Lane | (Japan) Uryu Nagata | | Orion Group |
| Lt.Sheikh Jamal Dhanmondi Club Limited | (Bangladesh) Mosharraf Hossain Badal (Interim) | (The Gambia) Solomon King Kanform | | Bashundhara A4 Paper |
| Muktijoddha Sangsad KC | (Malaysia) Raja Isa | (Japan) Yusuke Kato | | Hishab |
| Rahmatganj MFS | (Bangladesh) Syed Golam Jilani | (Bangladesh) Russel Mahmud Liton | | Tiger Cement |
| Saif Sporting Club | (Bangladesh) Zulfiker Mahmud Mintu | (Bangladesh) Jamal Bhuyan | | Saif Power Battery |
| Sheikh Russel KC | (Bangladesh) Saiful Bari Titu | (Bangladesh) Ashraful Islam Rana | | Bashundhara Cement |
| Uttar Baridhara Club | (Bangladesh) Mahabub Ali Manik | (Bangladesh) Sumon Reza | | Bashundhara Group |

=== Head coaching changes ===
| Team | Outgoing head coach | Manner of departure | Date of vacancy | Position in table | Incoming head coach | Date of appointment |
|---|---|---|---|---|---|---|
| Arambagh KS | (India) Subarata Bhattacharya Jr. | Sacked | January 2021 | 13th | (Brazil) Douglas Silva | 3 February 2021 |
| Uttar Baridhara Club | (Bangladesh) Sheikh Jahidur Rahman | Sacked | 31 January 2021 | 11th | (Bangladesh) Mahabub Ali Manik | February 2021 |
| Brothers Union | (Bangladesh) Abdul Qaium Sentu | Resigned | 16 February 2021 | 12th | (Iran) Reza Parkas | 10 March 2021 |
| Saif Sporting Club | (Belgium) Paul Put | Mutual Consent | 26 February 2021 | 7th | (Bangladesh) Zulfiker Mahmud Mintu (Interim) | 26 February 2021 |
| Arambagh KS | (Brazil) Douglas Silva | Sacked | 1 March 2021 | 13th | (Bangladesh) Sheikh Jahidur Rahman | 7 March 2021 |
| Saif Sporting Club | (Bangladesh) Zulfiker Mahmud Mintu | End of interim spell | 8 March 2021 | 4th | (England) Stewart Hall | 9 March 2021 |
| Saif Sporting Club | (England) Stewart Hall | End of contract | 1 August 2021 | 6th | (Bangladesh) Zulfiker Mahmud Mintu | 1 August 2021 |
| Sheikh Jamal Dhanmondi Club | (Bangladesh) Shafiqul Islam Manik | Sacked | 9 August 2021 | 2nd | (Bangladesh) Mosharraf Hossain Badal (Interim) | 9 August 2021 |

== Foreign players ==
| Other foreign players. |
| AFC quota players. |
| No foreign player registered. |

Bold names refer to international players who have already played or are still playing.

Note :
(substituted off) : players who released during summer transfer window;
(substituted on) : players who registered during summer transfer window.

| Club | Leg | Player 1 | Player 2 | Player 3 | Player 4 |
|---|---|---|---|---|---|
| Arambagh KS | First | (Ghana) Ibrahim Moro (substituted off) | (Ghana) Sadick Adams (substituted off) | (Nigeria) Christopher Chizoba (substituted off) | (Australia) Bradie Smith (substituted off) |
| Arambagh KS | Second | (Uzbekistan) Dilshod Nazirov (substituted on) | (Uzbekistan) Ildar Mamatkazin (substituted on) | (Uzbekistan) Islomjon Abdukodirov (substituted on) | (Uzbekistan) Kholmurod Kholmurodov (substituted on) |
| Bangladesh Police FC | First | (Ivory Coast) Ballo Famoussa (substituted off) | (Ivory Coast) Frederic Pooda | (Ivory Coast) Lancine Toure | (Kyrgyzstan) Murolimzhon Akhmedov |
| Bangladesh Police FC | Second | (Ivory Coast) Christian Kouakou (substituted on) | | | |
| Bashundhara Kings | First | (Argentina) Raúl Becerra | (Brazil) Fernandes | (Brazil) Robinho | (Iran) Khaled Shafiei |
| Bashundhara Kings | Second | | | | |
| Brothers Union | First | (Democratic Republic of the Congo) Siyo Zunapio (substituted off) | (Nigeria) Monday Osagie (substituted off) | (Nigeria) Samson Iliasu (substituted off) | (Uzbekistan) Furqat Hasanboev |
| Brothers Union | Second | (The Gambia) Momodou Bah (substituted on) | (Nigeria) Magalan Ugochukwu Awala (substituted on) | (Nigeria) Cyril Oriaku (substituted on) | |
| Chittagong Abahani Ltd. | First | (Brazil) Nixon Guylherme | (Ivory Coast) Didier Brossou | (Nigeria) Matthew Chinedu | (Uzbekistan) Shukurali Pulatov |
| Chittagong Abahani Ltd. | Second | | | | |
| Dhaka Abahani Ltd. | First | (Brazil) Francisco Torres (substituted off) | (Brazil) Raphael Augusto | (Haiti) Kervens Belfort | (Afghanistan) Masih Saighani |
| Dhaka Abahani Ltd. | Second | (Nigeria) Sunday Chizoba (substituted on) | | | |
| Dhaka Mohammedan SC Ltd. | First | (Burkina Faso) Mounzir Coulidiati | (Mali) Souleymane Diabate | (Nigeria) Mohammed Abiola Nurat (substituted off) | (Japan) Uryu Nagata |
| Dhaka Mohammedan SC Ltd. | Second | | | (Cameroon) Yassan Ouatching (substituted on) | |
| Lt. Sheikh Jamal Dhanmondi Club Ltd. | First | (The Gambia) Pa Omar Jobe | (The Gambia) Solomon King Kanform | (The Gambia) Sulayman Sillah | (Uzbekistan) Otabek Valijonov |
| Lt. Sheikh Jamal Dhanmondi Club Ltd. | Second | | | | |
| Muktijoddha Sangsad KC | First | (Cameroon) Christian Bekamenga (substituted off) | (Guinea) Younoussa Camara | (Japan) Yusuke Kato | (Uzbekistan) Akbarali Kholdarov (substituted off) |
| Muktijoddha Sangsad KC | Second | (Ivory Coast) Ballo Famoussa (substituted on) | | | (Ivory Coast) Ibrahim Abou Dicko (substituted on) |
| Rahmatganj MFS | First | (Ivory Coast) Lorougnon Christ Remi | (Egypt) Alaaeldin Nasr Elmagraby | (Tajikistan) Dilshod Vasiev (substituted off) | (Tajikistan) Khurshed Beknazarov |
| Rahmatganj MFS | Second | | | (Nigeria) Felix Chidi Odili (substituted on) | |
| Saif Sporting Club | First | (Nigeria) Emmanuel Ariwachukwu | (Nigeria) John Okoli | (Nigeria) Kenneth Ikechukwu | (Uzbekistan) Sirozhiddin Rakhmatullaev |
| Saif Sporting Club | Second | | | | |
| Sheikh Russel KC | First | (Brazil) Giancarlo Lopes Rodrigues | (Nigeria) Ugochukwu Obi Moneke | (Kyrgyzstan) Bakhtiyar Duyshobekov | (Tajikistan) Siyovush Asrorov |
| Sheikh Russel KC | Second | | | | |
| Uttar Baridhara Club | First | (Egypt) Mahmoud Sayed (substituted off) | (Egypt) Mostafa Kahraba | (Uzbekistan) Evgeniy Kochnev | (Uzbekistan) Saiddoston Fozilov |
| Uttar Baridhara Club | Second | (Ivory Coast) Youssouf Mory Bamba (substituted on) | | | |

== League table ==
| Pos | Team | Pld | W | D | L | GF | GA | GD | Pts | Qualification or relegation |
|---|---|---|---|---|---|---|---|---|---|---|
| 1 | Bashundhara Kings (C, Q) | 24 | 21 | 2 | 1 | 60 | 10 | +50 | 65 | Qualification for AFC Cup Group stage |
| 2 | Sheikh Jamal DC (Note: Sheikh Jamal cannot qualify for Asian Football Confederation competitions as they were not granted an AFC Cup license for 2022.) | 24 | 15 | 7 | 2 | 53 | 28 | +25 | 52 | |
| 3 | Dhaka Abahani (Q) | 24 | 13 | 8 | 3 | 65 | 29 | +36 | 47 | Qualification for AFC Cup qualifying play-offs |
| 4 | Saif Sporting Club | 24 | 14 | 2 | 8 | 48 | 37 | +11 | 44 | |
| 5 | Chittagong Abahani | 24 | 13 | 5 | 6 | 38 | 28 | +10 | 44 | |
| 6 | Dhaka Mohammedan | 24 | 12 | 7 | 5 | 36 | 25 | +11 | 43 | |
| 7 | Sheikh Russel KC | 24 | 11 | 3 | 10 | 36 | 31 | +5 | 36 | |
| 8 | Rahmatganj MFS | 24 | 6 | 7 | 11 | 23 | 31 | −8 | 25 | |
| 9 | Bangladesh Police FC | 24 | 6 | 7 | 11 | 26 | 39 | −13 | 25 | |
| 10 | Muktijoddha Sangsad KC | 24 | 4 | 7 | 13 | 18 | 34 | −16 | 19 | |
| 11 | Uttar Baridhara Club | 24 | 4 | 7 | 13 | 33 | 63 | −30 | 19 | |
| 12 | Arambagh KS (R) | 24 | 2 | 2 | 20 | 20 | 66 | −46 | 8 | Demotion to Senior Division League (Note: Arambagh KS demoted to the Senior Division League for two years after their involvement in live betting, spot fixing, match manipulation and online betting in three BPL matches.) |
| 13 | Brothers Union (R) | 24 | 1 | 4 | 19 | 16 | 51 | −35 | 7 | Relegation to Bangladesh Championship League |

Source: Soccerway
Rules for classification: 1) Points; 2) Goal difference; 3) Goals scored.
(C) Champions; (Q) Qualify for the AFC competition; (R) Relegated

== Results ==
| Home \ Away | AKS | BK | BPFC | BU | CAL | DAL | MSC | SJDC | MUK | RAH | SSC | SRKC | UB |
|---|---|---|---|---|---|---|---|---|---|---|---|---|---|
| Arambagh | — | 0–1 | 1–2 | 1–0 | 0–1 | 0–4 | 0–3 | 3–1 | 0–1 | 1–4 | 2–3 | 0–3 | 0–1 |
| Kings | 6–1 | — | 2–0 | 1–0 | 1–2 | 1–1 | 4–1 | 2–0 | 3–0 | 2–1 | 3–0 | 4–0 | 2–0 |
| Police | 1–0 | 1–2 | — | 0–0 | 3–3 | 2–2 | 1–1 | 3–3 | 3–1 | 0–0 | 1–4 | 0–1 | 1–0 |
| Brothers | 5–2 | 1–5 | 1–3 | — | 1–2 | 0–2 | 1–2 | 1–3 | 0–0 | 0–2 | 0–1 | 0–1 | 0–3 |
| Ctg Abahani | 1–0 | 0–1 | 4–1 | 1–0 | — | 0–2 | 1–1 | 1–3 | 1–0 | 0–2 | 5–2 | 0–1 | 2–2 |
| Abahani | 6–1 | 1–4 | 1–0 | 5–2 | 1–1 | — | 1–1 | 2–2 | 2–4 | 1–0 | 2–0 | 5–1 | 2–1 |
| Mohammedan | 2–1 | 0–1 | 1–0 | 2–0 | 2–2 | 2–2 | — | 0–2 | 2–0 | 2–0 | 1–2 | 1–0 | 4–1 |
| Sheikh Jamal | 6–0 | 0–0 | 2–1 | 0–0 | 2–1 | 2–2 | 2–0 | — | 2–1 | 1–0 | 2–1 | 4–2 | 3–3 |
| Muktijoddha | 0–0 | 0–3 | 1–0 | 4–0 | 0–1 | 1–4 | 0–2 | 1–2 | — | 1–1 | 1–2 | 0–0 | 0–0 |
| Rahmatganj | 3–0 | 0–3 | 1–1 | 2–0 | 0–2 | 0–6 | 1–2 | 1–1 | 0–0 | — | 0–0 | 0–1 | 3–1 |
| Saif | 4–3 | 1–2 | 2–0 | 4–0 | 0–1 | 3–2 | 1–2 | 2–3 | 4–1 | 1–1 | — | 2–1 | 2–1 |
| Sheikh Russel | 4–0 | 0–1 | 5–0 | 2–1 | 0–2 | 1–1 | 1–1 | 0–2 | 1–0 | 3–0 | 2–4 | — | 5–1 |
| Baridhara | 4–4 | 0–6 | 1–2 | 3–3 | 3–4 | 0–8 | 1–1 | 1–5 | 1–1 | 2–1 | 1–3 | 2–1 | — |

Updated to match(es) played on 20 September 2021. Source: Soccerway
Legend: Blue = home team win; Yellow = draw; Red = away team win.

=== Positions by round ===
The following table lists the positions of teams after each week of matches. In order to preserve the chronological evolution, any postponed matches are not included to the round at which they were originally scheduled but added to the full round they were played immediately afterward.

| Team ╲ Round | 1 | 2 | 3 | 4 | 5 | 6 | 7 | 8 | 9 | 10 | 11 | 12 | 13 | 14 | 15 | 16 | 17 | 18 | 19 | 20 | 21 | 22 | 23 | 24 | 25 | 26 |
|---|---|---|---|---|---|---|---|---|---|---|---|---|---|---|---|---|---|---|---|---|---|---|---|---|---|---|
| Kings | 2 | 1 | 1 | 1 | 1 | 1 | 1 | 1 | 1 | 1 | 1 | 1 | 1 | 1 | 1 | 1 | 1 | 1 | 1 | 1 | 1 | 1 | 1 | 1 | 1 | 1 |
| Sheikh Jamal | 3 | 3 | 4 | 4 | 3 | 2 | 2 | 3 | 3 | 3 | 2 | 2 | 2 | 2 | 2 | 3 | 3 | 3 | 2 | 2 | 3 | 2 | 2 | 2 | 2 | 2 |
| Abahani | 5 | 2 | 2 | 2 | 4 | 3 | 4 | 2 | 2 | 2 | 3 | 3 | 3 | 3 | 3 | 2 | 2 | 2 | 3 | 3 | 2 | 3 | 3 | 3 | 3 | 3 |
| Ctg Abahani | 10 | 7 | 5 | 6 | 6 | 7 | 7 | 7 | 7 | 6 | 6 | 7 | 7 | 7 | 7 | 6 | 5 | 5 | 5 | 4 | 4 | 4 | 4 | 4 | 6 | 5 |
| Mohammedan | 1 | 6 | 6 | 7 | 8 | 8 | 6 | 6 | 5 | 5 | 5 | 4 | 6 | 6 | 5 | 4 | 4 | 4 | 4 | 5 | 5 | 5 | 5 | 5 | 4 | 6 |
| Saif | 7 | 5 | 7 | 5 | 5 | 5 | 5 | 5 | 6 | 7 | 7 | 5 | 4 | 4 | 6 | 7 | 6 | 7 | 6 | 7 | 6 | 6 | 6 | 6 | 5 | 4 |
| Sheikh Russel | 4 | 4 | 3 | 3 | 2 | 4 | 3 | 4 | 4 | 4 | 4 | 6 | 5 | 5 | 4 | 5 | 7 | 6 | 7 | 6 | 7 | 7 | 7 | 7 | 7 | 7 |
| Police | 11 | 10 | 9 | 9 | 7 | 6 | 9 | 8 | 8 | 8 | 8 | 8 | 9 | 9 | 9 | 8 | 8 | 8 | 8 | 8 | 8 | 8 | 8 | 8 | 8 | 9 |
| Rahmatganj | 6 | 8 | 10 | 12 | 9 | 9 | 8 | 9 | 9 | 9 | 9 | 9 | 8 | 8 | 8 | 9 | 9 | 10 | 10 | 9 | 9 | 9 | 9 | 9 | 9 | 8 |
| Muktijoddha | 8 | 9 | 8 | 8 | 10 | 10 | 11 | 11 | 10 | 10 | 10 | 11 | 11 | 10 | 10 | 10 | 11 | 11 | 11 | 11 | 11 | 11 | 11 | 10 | 10 | 10 |
| Baridhara | 12 | 11 | 11 | 10 | 11 | 11 | 10 | 10 | 11 | 11 | 11 | 10 | 10 | 11 | 11 | 11 | 10 | 9 | 9 | 10 | 10 | 10 | 10 | 11 | 11 | 11 |
| Arambagh | 13 | 13 | 13 | 13 | 13 | 13 | 13 | 13 | 13 | 13 | 13 | 13 | 13 | 13 | 13 | 13 | 13 | 13 | 13 | 13 | 13 | 13 | 13 | 13 | 12 | 12 |
| Brothers | 9 | 12 | 12 | 11 | 12 | 12 | 12 | 12 | 12 | 12 | 12 | 12 | 12 | 12 | 12 | 12 | 12 | 12 | 12 | 12 | 12 | 12 | 12 | 12 | 13 | 13 |

| Leader |
| Runners-up |
| Relegation to BCL |

Updated to match(es) played on 20 September 2021. Source: Soccerway

== Season statistics ==
=== Goalscorers ===
There have been 472 goals scored in 156 matches, for an average of 3.03 goals per match (as of 20 September 2021).

21 goals

- (Brazil) Robinho (Bashundhara Kings)

19 goals

- (The Gambia) Pa Omar Jobe (Sheikh Jamal Dhanmondi Club)

18 goals

- (Nigeria) John Okoli (Saif Sporting Club)

17 goals

- (Haiti) Kervens Belfort (Dhaka Abahani)

16 goals

- (Argentina) Raúl Becerra (Bashundhara Kings)

13 goals

- (Mali) Souleymane Diabate (Dhaka Mohammedan)

12 goals

- (Brazil) Nixon Guylherme (Chittagong Abahani)

11 goals

- (The Gambia) Sulayman Sillah (Sheikh Jamal Dhanmondi Club)
- (Nigeria) Kenneth Ikechukwu (Saif Sporting Club)

10 goals

- (Bangladesh) Jewel Rana (Dhaka Abahani)
- (Bangladesh) Sumon Reza (Uttar Baridhara Club)
- (The Gambia) Solomon King Kanform (Sheikh Jamal Dhanmondi Club)
- (Nigeria) Ugochukwu Obi Moneke (Sheikh Russel KC)

9 goals

- (Nigeria) Sunday Chizoba (Dhaka Abahani)

8 goals

- (Ivory Coast) Christ Remi (Rahmatganj MFS)
- (Nigeria) Matthew Chinedu (Chittagong Abahani)

7 goals

- (Bangladesh) Rakib Hossain (Chittagong Abahani)
- (Brazil) Fernandes (Bashundhara Kings)
- (Brazil) Francisco Torres (Dhaka Abahani)
- (Ivory Coast) Christian Kouakou (Bangladesh Police FC)
- (Uzbekistan) Otabek Valijonov (Sheikh Jamal Dhanmondi Club)

6 goals

- (Bangladesh) Mohammad Abdullah (Sheikh Russel KC)
- (Bangladesh) Nihat Jaman Ucchash (Arambagh KS)
- (Bangladesh) Tawhidul Alam Sabuz (Bashundhara Kings)
- (Ivory Coast) Ballo Famoussa (Bangladesh Police FC / Muktijoddha Sangsad KC)
- (Nigeria) Felix Chidi Odili (Rahmatganj MFS)

5 goals

- (Brazil) Giancarlo Lopes Rodrigues (Sheikh Russel KC)
- (Kyrgyzstan) Bakhtiyar Duyshobekov (Sheikh Russel KC)
- (Tajikistan) Siyovush Asrorov (Sheikh Russel KC)

4 goals

- (Afghanistan) Masih Saighani (Dhaka Abahani)
- (Bangladesh) Amir Hakim Bappy (Dhaka Mohammedan)
- Mohammad Jewel (Bangladesh Police FC)
- (Bangladesh) Nurul Absar (Sheikh Jamal Dhanmondi Club)
- (Bangladesh) Sujon Biswas (Uttar Baridhara Club)
- (Bangladesh) Papon Singh (Uttar Baridhara Club)
- (Brazil) Raphael Augusto (Dhaka Abahani)
- (Cameroon) Yassan Ouatching (Dhaka Mohammedan)
- (Ivory Coast) Didier Brossou (Chittagong Abahani)
- (Ivory Coast) Frederic Pooda (Bangladesh Police FC)

3 goals

- (Bangladesh) Arif Hossain (Uttar Baridhara Club)
- (Bangladesh) Eleta Kingsley (Bashundhara Kings)
- (Bangladesh) Faisal Mahmud (Brothers Union)
- (Bangladesh) Foysal Ahmed Fahim (Saif Sporting Club)
- (Bangladesh) Maraz Hossain (Saif Sporting Club)
- (Bangladesh) Sazzad Hossain (Saif Sporting Club)
- (Ivory Coast) Ballo Famoussa (Bangladesh Police FC)
- (Ivory Coast) Lancine Toure (Bangladesh Police FC)
- (Democratic Republic of the Congo) Siyo Zunapio (Brothers Union)
- (Egypt) Mostafa Kahraba (Uttar Baridhara Club)
- (Uzbekistan) Evgeniy Kochnev (Uttar Baridhara Club)
- (Uzbekistan) Islomjon Abdukodirov (Arambagh KS)
- (Uzbekistan) Saiddoston Fozilov (Uttar Baridhara Club)

2 goals

- (Bangladesh) Dipok Roy (Dhaka Abahani)
- (Bangladesh) Faisal Ahmed Shitol (Dhaka Abahani)
- (Bangladesh) Jafar Iqbal (Dhaka Mohammedan)
- Jamir Uddin (Bangladesh Police FC)
- (Bangladesh) Kawsar Ali Rabbi (Chittagong Abahani)
- (Bangladesh) Khondoker Ashraful Islam (Sheikh Russel KC)
- (Bangladesh) Mannaf Rabby (Chittagong Abahani)
- (Bangladesh) Maruf Ahmed (Uttar Baridhara Club)
- (Bangladesh) Mehebub Hasan Nayan (Rahmatganj MFS)
- (Bangladesh) Mehedi Hasan Royal (Muktijoddha Sangsad KC)
- (Bangladesh) Omar Faruq (Arambagh KS)
- (Bangladesh) Sarower Zaman Nipu (Muktijoddha Sangsad KC)
- (Bangladesh) Topu Barman (Bashundhara Kings)
- (Bangladesh) Yeasin Arafat (Saif Sporting Club)
- (Burkina Faso) Mounzir Coulidiati (Dhaka Mohammedan)
- (Ivory Coast) Ibrahim Abou Dicko (Muktijoddha Sangsad KC)
- (Egypt) Mahmoud Sayed (Uttar Baridhara Club)
- (Japan) Uryu Nagata (Dhaka Mohammedan)
- (Japan) Yusuke Kato (Muktijoddha Sangsad KC)
- (Kyrgyzstan) Murolimzhon Akhmedov (Bangladesh Police FC)
- (Nigeria) Christopher Chizoba (Arambagh KS)
- (Nigeria) Emmanuel Ariwachukwu (Saif Sporting Club)
- (Nigeria) Magalan Awala (Brothers Union)
- (Nigeria) Mohammed Abiola Nurat (Dhaka Mohammedan)
- (Nigeria) Samson Iliasu (Brothers Union)
- (Tajikistan) Dilshod Vasiev (Rahmatganj MFS)
- (Uzbekistan) Sirozhiddin Rakhmatullaev (Saif Sporting Club)

1 goal

- (Bangladesh) Aminur Rahman Sajib (Dhaka Mohammedan)
- (Bangladesh) Anik Hossain (Dhaka Mohammedan)
- (Bangladesh) Arafat Hossain (Rahmatganj MFS)
- (Bangladesh) Arafat Mia (Arambagh KS)
- (Bangladesh) Arifur Rahman (Saif Sporting Club)
- (Bangladesh) Biplu Ahmed (Bashundhara Kings)
- (Bangladesh) Enamul Islam Gazi (Rahmatganj MFS)
- (Bangladesh) Imtiaz Sultan Jitu (Brothers Union)
- (Bangladesh) Jamal Bhuyan (Saif Sporting Club)
- (Bangladesh) Joseph Nur Rahman (Brothers Union)
- (Bangladesh) Kamrul Islam (Dhaka Mohammedan)
- (Bangladesh) Kawshik Barua (Chittagong Abahani)
- (Bangladesh) Mahadud Hossain Fahim (Muktijoddha Sangsad KC)
- (Bangladesh) Mahadud Sohel Rana (Muktijoddha Sangsad KC)
- (Bangladesh) Mahamudul Hasan Kiron (Rahmatganj MFS)
- (Bangladesh) Mahbubur Rahman Sufil (Bashundhara Kings)
- (Bangladesh) Mamun Miah (Dhaka Abahani)
- (Bangladesh) Mamunul Islam (Dhaka Abahani)
- (Bangladesh) Manik Hossain Molla (Chittagong Abahani)
- (Bangladesh) Mezbah Uddin (Brothers Union)
- (Bangladesh) Mohamed Atikuzzaman (Dhaka Mohammedan)
- (Bangladesh) Mohammad Ibrahim (Bashundhara Kings)
- (Bangladesh) Mohammad Khalekurzaman (Sheikh Russel KC)
- (Bangladesh) Mohammad Sayde (Arambagh KS)
- Mohammad Shadhin (Bangladesh Police FC)
- (Bangladesh) Mohammad Sohel Rana (Dhaka Abahani)
- (Bangladesh) Nasiruddin Chowdhury (Dhaka Abahani)
- (Bangladesh) Rashedul Islam Shuvo (Uttar Baridhara Club)
- (Bangladesh) Rezaul Karim (Sheikh Jamal Dhanmondi Club)
- (Bangladesh) Riyadul Hasan Rafi (Saif Sporting Club)
- (Bangladesh) Rubel Miya (Dhaka Abahani)
- (Bangladesh) Rumon Hossain (Sheikh Russel KC)
- (Bangladesh) Saad Uddin (Dhaka Abahani)
- (Nigeria) Sahedul Hasan Anik (Rahmatganj MFS)
- (Bangladesh) Sahed Hossain (Dhaka Abahani)
- (Bangladesh) Said Rakib Khan (Dhaka Mohammedan)
- (Bangladesh) Sajon Mia (Muktijoddha Sangsad KC)
- (Bangladesh) Shafiqul Islam Shofi (Brothers Union)
- (Bangladesh) Shakil Kishur (Muktijoddha Sangsad KC)
- (Bangladesh) Sohel Rana (Dhaka Abahani)
- (Cameroon) Christian Bekamenga (Muktijoddha Sangsad KC)
- (Ghana) Ibrahim Moro (Arambagh KS)
- (Ghana) Sadick Adams (Arambagh KS)
- (Guinea) Younoussa Camara (Muktijoddha Sangsad KC)
- (Iran) Khaled Shafiei (Bashundhara Kings)
- (Tajikistan) Khurshed Beknazarov (Rahmatganj MFS)
- (Uzbekistan) Akbarali Kholdarov (Muktijoddha Sangsad KC)
- (Uzbekistan) Dilshod Nazirov (Arambagh KS)
- (Uzbekistan) Furqat Hasanboev (Brothers Union)
- (Uzbekistan) Kholmurod Kholmurodov (Arambagh KS)

=== Own goals ===
† Bold Club indicates winner of the match

| Player | Club | Opponent | Result | Date |
|---|---|---|---|---|
| (Bangladesh) Mahamudul Hasan Kiron | Rahmatganj MFS | Bashundhara Kings | 0–3 | 27 January 2021 |
| (Bangladesh) Soeb Mia | Muktijoddha Sangsad KC | Sheikh Russel KC | 0–1 | 1 February 2021 |
| (Uzbekistan) Saiddoston Fozilov | Uttar Baridhara Club | Dhaka Abahani | 1–2 | 4 March 2021 |
| (Bangladesh) Habibur Rahman Shohag | Dhaka Mohammedan | Arambagh KS | 2–1 | 1 May 2021 |
| (Tajikistan) Khurshed Beknazarov | Rahmatganj MFS | Dhaka Abahani | 0–6 | 7 May 2021 |
| (Uzbekistan) Saiddoston Fozilov | Uttar Baridhara Club | Chittagong Abahani | 3–4 | 3 August 2021 |
| (Bangladesh) Asaduzzaman Bablu | Sheikh Russel KC | Saif Sporting Club | 2–4 | 10 August 2021 |
| (Bangladesh) Jahangir Alam Sajeeb | Bangladesh Police FC | Sheikh Jamal Dhanmondi Club | 1–2 | 16 August 2021 |
| (Bangladesh) Topu Barman | Bashundhara Kings | Dhaka Abahani | 1–1 | 20 September 2021 |

=== Hat-tricks ===
| Player | For | Against | Result | Date | Ref |
|---|---|---|---|---|---|
| (The Gambia) Pa Omar Jobe ^{4} | Sheikh Jamal Dhanmondi Club | Arambagh KS | 6–0 | 27 January 2021 | |
| (Nigeria) Ugochukwu Obi Moneke | Sheikh Russel KC | Arambagh KS | 4–0 | 9 February 2021 | |
| (Argentina) Raúl Becerra | Bashundhara Kings | Arambagh KS | 6–1 | 16 February 2021 | |
| (Brazil) Robinho | Bashundhara Kings | Arambagh KS | 6–1 | 16 February 2021 | |
| (Haiti) Kervens Belfort | Dhaka Abahani | Rahmatganj MFS | 6–0 | 7 May 2021 | |
| (Bangladesh) Jewel Rana | Dhaka Abahani | Arambagh KS | 6–1 | 9 August 2021 | |
| (The Gambia) Pa Omar Jobe | Sheikh Jamal Dhanmondi Club | Uttar Baridhara Club | 5–1 | 12 August 2021 | |
| (Ivory Coast) Christian Kouakou | Bangladesh Police FC | Muktijoddha Sangsad KC | 3–1 | 13 August 2021 | |
| (Haiti) Kervens Belfort ^{4} | Dhaka Abahani | Uttar Baridhara Club | 8–0 | 26 August 2021 | |

^{4} Player scored 4 goals.

=== Goalkeeping ===
| Rank | Player | Club | Clean sheets | Goals conceded |
|---|---|---|---|---|
| 1 | Anisur Zico | Bashundhara Kings | 12 | 10 |
| 2 | Ashraful Islam Rana | Sheikh Russel KC | 9 | 25 |
| 3 | Mohammad Nayeem | Chittagong Abahani | 8 | 21 |
| 4 | Shahidul Alam Sohel | Abahani Ltd. Dhaka | 7 | 22 |
| 5 | Russel Mahmud Liton | Rahmatganj MFS | 6 | 27 |
| 6 | Samiul Islam Masum | Sheikh Jamal DC | 5 | 7 |
| 7 | Hossain Suzan | Mohammedan SC | 4 | 11 |
| 8 | Mohammad Razib | Muktijoddha Sangsad KC | 4 | 15 |
| 9 | Mahfuz Hasan Pritom | Muktijoddha Sangsad KC | 4 | 17 |
| 10 | Pappu Hossain | Saif Sporting Club | 4 | 22 |
| 11 | Mohammad Nehal | Bangladesh Police | 3 | 19 |
| 12 | Mitul Marma | Uttar Baridhara Club | 3 | 29 |
| 13 | Hamidur Rahman Remon | Bashundhara Kings | 2 | 0 |
| 14 | Ahsan Habib Bipu | Dhaka Mohammedan | 2 | 14 |
| 15 | Ziaur Rahman | Sheikh Jamal DC | 2 | 20 |
| 16 | Titumir Chowdhury | Brothers Union | 2 | 21 |
| 17 | Mitul Hasan | Bashundhara Kings | 1 | 0 |
| 18 | Ariful Islam | Rahmatganj MFS | 1 | 3 |
| 19 | Sultan Ahmed Shakil | Abahani Ltd. Dhaka | 1 | 6 |
| 20 | Shibli Ahmed Sohan | Arambagh KS | 1 | 9 |
| 21 | Mohiuddin Ranu | Brothers Union | 1 | 10 |
| 22 | Arifuzzaman Hemel | Police FC | 1 | 15 |
| 23 | Kashem Milon | Arambagh KS | 1 | 22 |
| 24 | Rayhan Jaber | Arambagh KS | 0 | 1 |
| 24 | Antor Ali | Arambagh KS | 0 | 1 |
| 24 | Rakibul Hasan Tushar | Rahmatganj MFS | 0 | 1 |
| 24 | Mamun Khan | Sheikh Jamal DC | 0 | 1 |
| 28 | Nurul Karim | Muktijoddha Sangsad KC | 0 | 2 |
| 29 | Azad Hossain | Chittagong Abahani | 0 | 3 |
| 30 | Omer Faruk Linkcon | Arambagh KS | 0 | 4 |
| 30 | Mazharul Islam Himel | Chittagong Abahani | 0 | 4 |
| 32 | Saiful Islam Khan | Bangladesh Police FC | 0 | 5 |
| 33 | Sabuj Das Raghu | Sheikh Russel KC | 0 | 6 |
| 34 | Saiful Islam | Saif Sporting Club | 0 | 7 |
| 35 | Shanto Ray | Saif SC | 0 | 8 |
| 36 | Azad Hossen | Uttar Baridhara | 0 | 9 |
| 37 | Jasim Uddin | Uttar Baridhara | 0 | 12 |
| 38 | Mamun Alif | Uttar Baridhara | 0 | 13 |
| 39 | Jafor Sarder | Brothers Union | 0 | 20 |
| 40 | Appel Mahmud | Arambagh KS | 0 | 29 |

Notes

- Clean sheet is counted for not conceding a goal whilst on the pitch and playing at least 60 minutes (excluding stoppage time).

=== Discipline ===
==== Player ====
- Most yellow cards: 9
  - Otabek Valijonov (Sheikh Jamal DC)
- Most red cards: 1
  - Jewel Rana (Abahani Ltd. Dhaka)
  - Faisal Mahmood (Brothers Union)
  - Tariq Kazi (Bashundhara Kings)
  - Yeasin Khan (Bashundhara Kings)
  - Monjurur Rahman Manik (Chittagong Abahani)
  - Rakib Hossain (Chittagong Abahani)
  - Mehedi Hasan Mithu (Muktijoddha Sangsad KC)
  - Mohammad Sujon (Mohammedan SC)
  - Russel Mahmud Liton (Rahmatganj MFS)
  - Solomon King Kanform (Sheikh Jamal DC)
  - Suleiman Sillah (Sheikh Jamal DC)
  - Otabek Valijonov (Sheikh Jamal DC)
  - Faysal Ahmed (Sheikh Jamal DC)
  - Khurshed Beknazarov (Rahmatganj MFS)

==== Club ====
- Most yellow cards:

| Rank | Club | Yellow cards |
|---|---|---|
| 1 | Mohammedan Sporting Club | 48 |
| 2 | Arambagh Krira Sangha | 44 |
| 3 | Sheikh Jamal DC | 43 |
| 4 | Saif Sporting Club | 40 |
| 5 | Uttar Baridhara Club | 37 |
| 5 | Brothers Union | 37 |
| 7 | Muktijoddha Sangsad KC | 36 |
| 8 | Chittagong Abahani | 31 |
| 9 | Bashundhara Kings | 30 |
| 10 | Rahmatganj MFS | 28 |
| 11 | Abahani Limited Dhaka | 26 |
| 12 | Sheikh Russel KC | 21 |
| 13 | Bangladesh Police FC | 20 |

- Most red cards:

| Rank | Club | Red cards |
|---|---|---|
| 1 | Sheikh Jamal DC | 4 |
| 2 | Bashundhara Kings | 2 |
| 2 | Chittagong Abahani | 2 |
| 2 | Rahmatganj MFS | 2 |
| 5 | Abahani Limited Dhaka | 1 |
| 5 | Brothers Union | 1 |
| 5 | Mohammedan Sporting Club | 1 |
| 5 | Muktijoddha Sangsad KC | 1 |

== Awards ==
| Award | Winner | Club |
|---|---|---|
| BPL Coach of the Season | (Spain) Óscar Bruzón | Bashundhara Kings |
| BPL Player of the Season | (Brazil) Robson Azevedo da Silva | Bashundhara Kings |
| BPL Goalkeeper of the Season | (Bangladesh) Anisur Rahman Zico | Bashundhara Kings |
| BPL Emerging Player of the Season | (Bangladesh) Nihat Jaman Ucchash | Arambagh KS |
| Fair Play Trophy | | Dhaka Abahani |
