= 2024–25 MC Oran season =

MC Oran
2024–25 season
- Owner: Hyproc Shipping Company
- President: Chakib Ghomari
- Head coach: Youcef Bouzidi (until 5 October 2024); Éric Chelle (from 9 October 2024) (until 12 January 2025); Abdelkader Amrani (from 6 February 2025)
- Stadium: Miloud Hadefi Stadium
- Ligue 1: 8th
- Algerian Cup: Round of 16
- Top goalscorer: League: Merouane Dahar (5 goals); All: Merouane Dahar (6 goals)
Home colours	Away colours	Third colours

The 2024–25 season, is MC Oran's 59th season and the club's 16th consecutive season in the top flight of Algerian football. In addition to the domestic league, MC Oran are participating in the Algerian Cup. On June 27, 2024 The federal office approved the calendar for the 2024–25 Ligue 1 season with the aim of ending on May 31, 2025. The first round is scheduled for September 14, this delay is motivated both by an extended end of the 2023–24 season but also by the holding of early presidential elections which will take place on September 7, 2024. However, the Ligue de Football Professionnel decided to postpone the start of the Ligue 1 by a week, on September 21.

== Squad list ==
Players and squad numbers last updated on 20 June 2025.
Note: Flags indicate national team as has been defined under FIFA eligibility rules. Players may hold more than one non-FIFA nationality.

No.	Nat.	Name	Position	Date of birth (age)	Signed from	Signed in	Contract ends	Apps	Goals
Goalkeepers
1	(Algeria)	Léonard Aggoune	GK	18 December 1997 (aged 26)	(France) FC Rouen	2024	2026	11	0
16	(Algeria)	Chamseddine Rahmani	GK	15 September 1990 (aged 33)	(Algeria) JS Kabylie	2024	2026	21	0
30	(Algeria)	Anis Mendil	GK	14 November 2005 (aged 18)	(Algeria) Reserve team	2024	2025	1	0
Defenders
2	(Algeria)	Kelyan Guessoum	CB	5 February 1999 (aged 25)	(Bulgaria) Etar Veliko Tarnovo	2024	2027	23	0
3	(Algeria)	Abdelkarim Mammar	CB	21 October 1996 (aged 27)	(Sweden) Degerfors IF	2024	2027	30	1
5	(Algeria)	Tarek Aggoun	CB	27 October 1997 (aged 26)	(Algeria) ES Sétif	2024	2026	20	1
12	(Algeria)	Abdelkader Belharrane	RB	August 11, 2000 (aged 24)	(Algeria) USM Alger	2023	2025	52	0
14	(Algeria)	Hamida Salah	LB	23 May 1992 (aged 32)	(Algeria) NC Magra	2024	2026	22	0
24	(Algeria)	Ahmed Kerroum	CB	27 June 2000 (aged 24)	(Algeria) ASO Chlef	2024	2026	48	5
25	(Mauritania)	Sid' Ahmed Ablla	CB	24 December 2000 (aged 23)	(Democratic Republic of the Congo) AS Vita Club	2025	2025	5	0
29	(Algeria)	Oussama Benatia	RB	14 August 2005 (aged 19)	(Algeria) Reserve team	2024	2025	3	1
Midfielders
4	(Algeria)	Abderrahmane Bourdim	AM	14 June 1994 (aged 31)	(Algeria) ASO Chlef	2025	2027	11	2
6	(Algeria)	Dalil Hassen Khodja	MF	3 April 1999 (aged 25)	(Algeria) MC El Bayadh	2025	2027	12	0
8	(Algeria)	Juba Aguieb	AM	28 November 1996 (aged 27)	(Algeria) ASO Chlef	2024	2026	31	2
10	(Algeria)	Chahreddine Boukholda	AM	24 May 1996 (aged 28)	(Bulgaria) Etar Veliko Tarnovo	2024	2027	18	3
13	(Algeria)	Seddik Senhadji	DM	3 November 2000 (aged 23)	(Algeria) CR Témouchent	2022	2026	36	0
19	(Algeria)	Merouane Dahar (C.)	CM	25 December 1992 (aged 31)	(Algeria) AS Ain M'lila	2021	2025	83	15
23	(Algeria)	Abdelhafid Benamara	DM	October 1, 1995 (aged 28)	(Algeria) USM El Harrach	2019	2025	211	3
Forwards
7	(Ghana)	Maxwell Baakoh	RW	8 October 1995 (aged 28)	(Algeria) USM Khenchela	2024	2026	23	2
9	(Algeria)	Karim Aribi	ST	24 June 1994 (aged 30)	(Saudi Arabia) Ohod Club	2024	2026	28	3
11	(The Gambia)	Pa Omar Jobe	ST	26 December 1998 (aged 25)	(Algeria) Reserve team	2025	2026	14	2
17	(Algeria)	Zoubir Motrani	ST	24 July 1995 (aged 29)	(Saudi Arabia) Al-Nairyah Club	2023	2025	88	16
18	(Ivory Coast)	Mohamed Sylla	ST	12 November 2001 (aged 22)	(Ivory Coast) RC Abidjan	2024	2027	18	1
21	(Algeria)	Abdelaziz Moulay	RW	20 April 1999 (aged 25)	(Algeria) ES Sétif	2025	2027	11	2
27	(Algeria)	Yacine Aliane	LW	28 August 1999 (aged 25)	(Algeria) ASO Chlef	2024	2027	20	0
28	(Algeria)	Mounir Mahadene	ST	3 April 2005 (aged 19)	(Algeria) Reserve team	2024	2026	4	0

== Transfers ==
=== In ===
==== Summer ====
Date	Pos	Player	Moving from	Fee	Source
2 July 2024	GK	(Algeria) Chamseddine Rahmani	JS Kabylie	Free transfer	
4 July 2024	MF	(Algeria) Juba Aguieb	ASO Chlef	Free transfer	
9 July 2024	DF	(Algeria) Kelyan Guessoum	(Bulgaria) Etar Veliko Tarnovo	Free transfer	
11 July 2024	GK	(Algeria) Léonard Aggoune	(France) FC Rouen	Free transfer	
12 July 2024	CB	(Algeria) Abdelkarim Mammar	(Sweden) Degerfors IF	Free transfer	
13 July 2024	DM	(Ivory Coast) Sery Gnoleba	(Ivory Coast) ASEC Mimosas	Free transfer	
13 July 2024	FW	(Ivory Coast) Mohamed Sylla	(Ivory Coast) RC Abidjan	Free transfer	
14 July 2024	FW	(Algeria) Yacine Aliane	ASO Chlef	Free transfer	
16 July 2024	FW	(Algeria) Karim Aribi	(Saudi Arabia) Ohod Club	Free transfer	
16 July 2024	MF	(Algeria) Chahreddine Boukholda	(Bulgaria) Etar Veliko Tarnovo	Free transfer	
18 July 2024	LB	(Algeria) Yanis Hamache	(Portugal) Arouca	Undisclosed	
18 July 2024	CB	(Algeria) Tarek Aggoun	ES Sétif	Free transfer	

==== Winter ====
Date	Pos	Player	Moving to	Fee	Source
22 January 2025	AM	(Algeria) Abderrahmane Bourdim	ASO Chlef	Undisclosed	
1 February 2025	RW	(Algeria) Moulay Abdelaziz	ES Sétif	Free transfer	
1 February 2025	MF	(Algeria) Dalil Hassen Khodja	MC Alger	Free transfer	

=== Out ===
==== Summer ====
Date	Pos	Player	Moving to	Fee	Source
18 July 2024	CB	(Algeria) Abdelkader Tamimi	ES Mostaganem	Free transfer	
27 July 2024	MF	(Algeria) Juba Oukaci	Olympique Akbou	Free transfer	
30 July 2024	GK	(Algeria) Mohammed Reyad Lezoul	ES Mostaganem	Free transfer	
2 August 2024	CB	(Algeria) Mohamed Naâmani	NA Hussein Dey	Free transfer	
7 August 2024	DM	(Algeria) Salim Bennai	RC Kouba	Free transfer	
12 August 2024	AM	(Algeria) Imed Saihi	RC Kouba	Free transfer	
14 August 2024	LB	(Algeria) Djamel Ibouzidène	RC Kouba	Free transfer	

==== Winter ====
Date	Pos	Player	Moving to	Fee	Source
21 January 2025	DM	(Ivory Coast) Sery Gnoleba	Unattached	Free transfer (Released)	
28 January 2025	CM	(Algeria) Aymen Chadli	Unattached	Free transfer (Released)	
30 January 2025	RW	(Algeria) Oualid Ardji	Unattached (Note: Ardji joined RC Kouba on 7 February 2025.)	Free transfer (Released)	
1 February 2025	RW	(Algeria) Merouane Boussalem	Unattached (Note: Boussalem joined US Biskra on 4 February 2025.)	Free transfer (Released)	
5 February 2025	LB	(Algeria) Yanis Hamache	Unattached	Free transfer (Released)	

== Pre-season and friendlies ==
22 August 2024 Friendly	MC Oran (Algeria)	2–1	(United Arab Emirates) Al Dhaid SC	Gölcük, Turkey
17:00 UTC+3	Baakoh 6'; Merouane Boussalem 88'		? 16'	Stadium: Gölcük City Stadium
Note: Lineup for MC Oran; First half - Léonard Aggoune, Tarek Aggoun, Mammar, Guessoum, Hamache, Gnoleba, Boukholda, Motrani, Aliane, Baakoh, Aribi. Second half - Rahmani, Belharrane, Kerroum, Chadli, H'mida Salah, Benamara, Senhadji (Boussalem, 70'), Dahar, Juba Aguieb, Ardji, Sylla.

23 August 2024 Friendly	MC Oran (Algeria)	1–2	(Qatar) Al-Markhiya SC	Kocaeli, Turkey
17:00 UTC+3	Boukholda 11' (pen.)		Meisara 57'; Al Sadeq 61'	Stadium: Sporterio Arena
Note: Lineup for MC Oran; First half - Rahmani, Tarek Aggoun, Mammar, Boussalem, Hamache, Gnoleba, Boukholda, Dahar, Baakoh, Sylla, Aliane. Second half - Léonard Aggoune, Guessoum, Kerroum, H'mida, Chadli, Senhadji, Benamara, Juba, Ardji, Aribi, Motrani.

27 August 2024 Friendly	MC Oran (Algeria)	3–2	(Bahrain) Al-Muharraq SC	Kocaeli, Turkey
17:00 UTC+3	Dahar 17'; Sylla 61'; Aliane 64'		Juninho 53' (pen.), 80' (pen.)	Stadium: Sporterio Arena
Note: Lineup for MC Oran; First half - Rahmani, Tarek Aggoun, Mammar, Boussalem, Hamache, Gnoleba, Boukholda, Dahar, Motrani, Baakoh, Aribi. Second half - Léonard Aggoune, Guessoum (Benamara, ?'), Kerroum, H'mida, Belharrane, Senhadji, Chadli (Benatia, ?'), Juba Aguieb (Mahadene, ?'), Aliane, Ardji, Sylla.

30 August 2024 Friendly	MC Oran (Algeria)	0–0	Kyrgyzstan	Gölcük, Turkey
17:00 UTC+3				Stadium: Gölcük İhsaniye Stadı
Note: Lineup for MC Oran - Rahmani, Tarek Aggoun (H'mida, 76'), Kerroum, Belharrane (Guessoum, 62'), Hamache (Mammar, 25'), Gnoleba, Dahar (Dahar, 85'), Boussalem (Ardji, 62'), Aliane (Benamara, 62'), Motrani (Aribi, 62'), Sylla (Juba Aguieb, 62').

11 September 2024 Friendly	MC Oran	2–0	GC Mascara	Bir El Djir (Oran)
16:30 UTC+1	Aribi 42'; Motrani 45+1'			Stadium: Miloud Hadefi Stadium – Annexe 1
Note: Lineup for MC Oran - Léonard Aggoune (Mendil, 60'), Tarek Aggoun (H'mida, 46'), Kerroum, Guessoum (Belharrane, 46'), Mammar, Gnoleba, Juba Aguieb (Benamara, 46'), Dahar (Chadli, 60'), Boussalem (Mahadene, 60'), Motrani (Ardji, 46'), Sylla (Aribi, 30').

14 September 2024 Friendly	MC Oran	1–0	USM Bel Abbès	Bir El Djir (Oran)
16:30 UTC+1	Ardji 10' (pen.)			Stadium: Miloud Hadefi Stadium – Annexe 1
Note: Lineup for MC Oran - Rahmani (Mendil, 67'), Tarek Aggoun (Kerroum, 46'), Mammar, Belharrane (Guessoum, 46'), H'mida, Gnoleba, Benamara, Dahar (Chadli, 73'), Juba Aguieb (Boussalem, 46'), Ardji (Motrani, 46'), Aribi (Mahadene, 67').

16 September 2024 Friendly	MC Oran	1–0	WA Mostaganem	Bir El Djir (Oran)
17:00 UTC+1	Boussalem 57'			Stadium: Miloud Hadefi Stadium – Annexe 1
Note: Lineup for MC Oran - Mendil (Rahmani, 33', Léonard Aggoune, 61'), Guessoum (Mammar, 46'), Tarek Aggoun, Kerroum, Belharrane (H'mida, 30'), Benatia (Belharrane, 46'), Senhadji (Benamara, 46'), Chadli (Boussalem, 46'), Juba Aguieb (Chadli, 61'), Dahar, Ardji (Mahadene, 61'), Motrani (Tarek Aggoun, 46').

2 March 2025 Friendly	MC Oran	5–0	IRB El Kerma	Bir El Djir (Oran)
22:00 UTC+1	Bourdim 26'; Aribi 40' (pen.); Kerroum 46'; Aliane 48'; Mohamed Sylla 90+1'			Stadium: Miloud Hadefi Stadium – Annexe 1

== Competitions ==
=== Overview ===
Competition	Record								Started round	Final position / round	First match	Last match
Competition	G	W	D	L	GF	GA	GD	Win %	Started round	Final position / round	First match	Last match
Ligue 1	30	12	4	14	32	33	−1	40.00	—N/a	8th	24 September 2024	20 June 2025
Algerian Cup	3	2	0	1	4	3	+1	66.67	Round of 64	Round of 16	4 January 2025	7 February 2025
Total	33	14	4	15	36	36	+0	42.42				

Updated to match played 20 June 2025
Source: Competitions

=== Ligue 1 ===
==== League table ====
Pos	Team	Pld	W	D	L	GF	GA	GD	Pts	Qualification or relegation
6	ES Sétif	30	11	8	11	21	24	−3	41	
7	USM Alger	30	10	10	10	26	26	0	40	Qualification for Confederation Cup (Note: USMA Alger qualified for the 2025–26 CAF Confederation Cup by winning the 2024–25 Algerian Cup)
8	MC Oran	30	12	4	14	32	33	−1	40	
9	USM Khenchela	30	11	7	12	28	38	−10	40	
10	CS Constantine	30	9	12	9	31	31	0	39	

Source: the-sports.org
Rules for classification: 1) points; 2) head-to-head points; 3) head-to-head goal difference; 4) goal difference; 5) total goals; 6) fairplay ranking; 7) playoff.

==== Results summary ====
Overall								Home						Away					
Pld	W	D	L	GF	GA	GD	Pts	W	D	L	GF	GA	GD	W	D	L	GF	GA	GD
30	12	4	14	32	33	−1	40	11	2	2	21	7	+14	1	2	12	11	26	−15

Last updated: 20 June 2025.
Source: Competitive matches

==== Results by round ====
Round	1	2	3	4	5	6	7	8	9	10	11	12	13	14	15	16	17	18	19	20	21	22	23	24	25	26	27	28	29	30
Ground	H	A	H	A	H	A	H	H	A	H	A	H	A	H	A	A	H	A	H	A	H	A	A	H	A	H	A	H	A	H
Result	W	L	D	L	W	D	W	W	L	D	L	W	L	L	L	L	W	L	L	L	W	D	L	W	L	W	W	W	L	W
Position	1	6	7	9	7	6	5	3	6	6	8	5	8	9	11	13	11	11	12	13	12	12	12	11	11	11	10	9	9	8

Updated to match(es) played on 20 June 2025. Source: Competitive matches
A = Away; H = Home; W = Win; D = Draw; L = Loss

==== Matches ====
The league fixtures were announced on 11 July 2024.

All times are local, WAT (UTC+1).

Win Draw Loss Postponed

24 September 2024 Round 1	MC Oran	2–0	JS Saoura	Bir El Djir
18:00	Belmiloud 11' (o.g.); Kerroum 78'	Report		Stadium: Miloud Hadefi Stadium; Referee: Bilel Soltani; VAR: Lotfi Bekouassa

28 September 2024 Round 2	ES Mostaganem	2–1	MC Oran	Mostaganem
18:00	Addadi 51' (pen.); Hitala 70'	Report	Aguieb 42'	Stadium: Mohamed Bensaïd Stadium; Attendance: 0 (close doors); Referee: Lahlou Benbraham; VAR: Yahia Dehar

4 October 2024 Round 3	MC Oran	0–0	ASO Chlef	Bir El Djir
20:30		Report		Stadium: Miloud Hadefi Stadium; Referee: Mehdi Oukil; VAR: Alaa Bouab

11 October 2024 Round 4	MC Alger	1–0	MC Oran	Baraki
20:30	Naidji 66'	Report		Stadium: Nelson Mandela Stadium; Referee: Alaa Bouab; VAR: Tahar Boudjemaa

19 October 2024 Round 5	MC Oran	2–0	JS Kabylie	Bir El Djir
19:00	Mammar 26'; Dahar 82' (pen.)	Report		Stadium: Miloud Hadefi Stadium; Referee: Fateh Harkat; VAR: Lotfi Bekouassa

25 October 2024 Round 6	Paradou AC	2–2	MC Oran	Algiers
19:30	Soukkou 44'; Boulbina 83'	Report	Dahar 59' (pen.); Boukholda 88'	Stadium: Stade du 5 Juillet; Referee: Tahar Boudjemaa; VAR: Rafik Aouina

2 November 2024 Round 7	MC Oran	1–0	CS Constantine	Bir El Djir
17:45	Motrani 9'	Report		Stadium: Miloud Hadefi Stadium; Attendance: 0 (close doors); Referee: Anes Azrine

7 November 2024 Round 8	MC Oran	1–0	ES Sétif	Bir El Djir
19:30	Aguieb 61'	Report		Stadium: Miloud Hadefi Stadium; Referee: Mehdi Oukil; VAR: Anes Azrine

15 November 2024 Round 9	Olympique Akbou	3–1	MC Oran	Béjaïa
15:00	Haroun 81' (pen.); Bouteldja 90+6'; Adrar 90+9'	Report	Boussalem 83'	Stadium: Maghrebi Unity Stadium; Referee: Youcef Gamouh; VAR: Alaa Bouab

22 November 2024 Round 10	MC Oran	0–0	USM Khenchela	Bir El Djir
17:45		Report		Stadium: Miloud Hadefi Stadium; Referee: Lahlou Benbraham; VAR: Mehdi Oukil

30 November 2024 Round 11	NC Magra	2–1	MC Oran	Magra
15:00	Amrane 58', 90+4' (pen.)	Report	Boussalem 45+1'	Stadium: Boucheligue Brothers Stadium; Referee: Redouane Allou

8 December 2024 Round 12	MC Oran	1–0	US Biskra	Bir El Djir
20:00	Aggoun 78'	Report		Stadium: Miloud Hadefi Stadium; Referee: Fateh Harkat; VAR: Rafik Aouina

13 December 2024 Round 13	MC El Bayadh	1–0	MC Oran	El Bayadh
15:00	Toumi Sief 24'	Report		Stadium: Zakaria Medjdoub Stadium; Referee: Abdelali Ibrir

26 December 2024 Round 15	USM Alger	3–0	MC Oran	Algiers
19:00	Benzaza 48'; Aggoun 90+3' (o.g.); Azzi 90+6'	Report		Stadium: Stade du 5 Juillet; Referee: Rafik Aouina; VAR: Yahia Dehar

3 February 2025 Round 14	MC Oran	1–2	CR Belouizdad	Bir El Djir
18:00	Aribi 80'	Report	Mahious 31', 46'	Stadium: Miloud Hadefi Stadium; Attendance: 0 (close doors); Referee: Youcef Gamouh; VAR: Alaa Bouab

12 February 2025 Round 16	JS Saoura	2–0	MC Oran	Béchar
16:30	Bentaleb 80'; Saâdi 90+9' (pen.)	Report		Stadium: 20 August 1955 Stadium; Referee: Alaa Bouab

19 February 2025 Round 17	MC Oran	1–0	ES Mostaganem	Bir El Djir
17:00	Moulay 26'	Report		Stadium: Miloud Hadefi Stadium; Attendance: 0 (close doors); Referee: Akram Mechairia; VAR: Yahia Dehar

25 February 2025 Round 18	ASO Chlef	1–0	MC Oran	Chlef
15:30	Agbagno 90+4' (pen.)	Report		Stadium: Mohamed Boumezrag Stadium; Referee: Yahia Dehar; VAR: Fateh Harkat

6 March 2025 Round 19	MC Oran	0–2	MC Alger	Bir El Djir
22:00		Report	Bayazid 7'; Naidji 49'	Stadium: Miloud Hadefi Stadium; Attendance: 0 (close doors); Referee: Rafik Aouina; VAR: Yahia Dehar

14 March 2025 Round 20	JS Kabylie	2–1	MC Oran	Tizi Ouzou
22:00	Ignatyev 16'; Lahmeri 68'	Report	Dahar 54'	Stadium: Hocine Aït Ahmed Stadium; Referee: Anes Azrine; VAR: Rafik Aouina

4 April 2025 Round 21	MC Oran	2–0	Paradou AC	Oran
18:00	Dahar 20' (pen.); Motrani 66'	Report		Stadium: Ahmed Zabana Stadium; Attendance: 0 (close doors); Referee: Youcef Gamouh

18 April 2025 Round 23	ES Sétif	1–0	MC Oran	Sétif
18:00	Djahnit 85' (pen.)	Report		Stadium: 8 May 1945 Stadium; Referee: Alaa Bouab; VAR: Redouane Allou

25 April 2025 Round 24	MC Oran	1–0	Olympique Akbou	Oran
18:00	Dahar 54' (pen.)	Report		Stadium: Ahmed Zabana Stadium; Referee: Anes Azrine

10 May 2025 Round 25	USM Khenchela	2–1	MC Oran	Khenchela
16:00	Oukil 4'; Djaouchi 40' (pen.)	Report	Goudjil 33'	Stadium: Amar Hamam Stadium; Attendance: 0 (close doors); Referee: Hamza Bouslimani

16 May 2025 Round 26	MC Oran	2–1	NC Magra	Oran
16:30	Jobe 8', 45+3'	Report	Amrane 15'	Stadium: Ahmed Zabana Stadium; Referee: Mehdi Oukil; VAR: Lahlou Benbraham

22 May 2025 Round 22	CS Constantine	2–2	MC Oran	Constantine
18:00	Benchaâ 9'; Dib 19'	Report	Kerroum 59'; Baakoh 63'	Stadium: Chahid Hamlaoui Stadium; Referee: Haitham Ghouti; VAR: Mehdi Oukil

26 May 2025 Round 27	US Biskra	0–2	MC Oran	Biskra
17:45		Report	Boukholda 10'; Mayouf 39' (o.g.)	Stadium: 18 February Stadium; Referee: Redouane Allou; VAR: Rafik Aouina

11 June 2025 Round 28	MC Oran	3–2	MC El Bayadh	Oran
17:00	Boukholda 13'; Bourdim 87', 90+5'	Report	Barkat 45+1'; Sediri 61'	Stadium: Ahmed Zabana Stadium; Referee: Tahar Boudjemaa

17 June 2025 Round 29	CR Belouizdad	2–0	MC Oran	Algiers
17:30	Mahious 45' (pen.); Hamroune 58'	Report		Stadium: Stade du 5 Juillet; Referee: Fateh Harkat; VAR: Ghada Mehat

20 June 2025 Round 30	MC Oran	4–0	USM Alger	Oran
18:00	Goudjil 40'; Moulay 85'; Jobe 90+1'; Benatia 90+4'	Report		Stadium: Ahmed Zabana Stadium; Referee: Mehdi Oukil

=== Algerian Cup ===
4 January 2025 Round of 64	US Béchar Djedid	2–3 (a.e.t.)	MC Oran	Béchar
15:00	Kihel 59'; Saadi 115'	Report	Sylla 32'; Aribi 105', 119'	Stadium: 20 August 1955 Stadium; Referee: Abderahmane Mohamed Belkebir

11 January 2025 Round of 32	USM Sétif	0–1	MC Oran	Sétif
17:00		Report	Dahar 53' (pen.)	Stadium: 8 May 1945 Stadium; Referee: Oussama Mekfoudji

7 February 2025 Round of 16	MC Oran	0–1	USM El Harrach	Bir El Djir
18:00		Report	Berrabeh 55'	Stadium: Miloud Hadefi Stadium; Referee: Bilel Soltani

== Squad information ==
=== Appearances and goals ===
As of 20 June 2025

No.	Pos	Player	Nat	Ligue 1			Algerian Cup			Total		
No.	Pos	Player	Nat	App	St	G	App	St	G	App	St	G
Goalkeepers
1	GK	Léonard Aggoune	(Algeria)	9	9	0	2	2	0	11	11	0
16	GK	Chamseddine Rahmani	(Algeria)	20	20	0	1	1	0	21	21	0
30	GK	Anis Mendil	(Algeria)	1	1	0	0	0	0	1	1	0
Defenders
2	CB	Kelyan Guessoum	(Algeria)	21	17	0	2	2	0	23	19	0
3	CB	Abdelkarim Mammar	(Algeria)	28	28	1	2	2	0	30	30	1
5	CB	Tarek Aggoun	(Algeria)	17	11	1	3	3	0	20	14	1
12	RB	Abdelkader Belharrane	(Algeria)	27	27	0	3	3	0	30	30	0
14	LB	Hamida Salah	(Algeria)	14	8	0	0	0	0	14	8	0
24	CB	Ahmed Kerroum	(Algeria)	28	28	2	2	2	0	30	30	2
25	CB	Sid' Ahmed Ablla	(Algeria)	5	4	0	0	0	0	5	4	0
29	RB	Oussama Benatia	(Algeria)	2	2	1	1	0	0	3	2	1
Midfielders
4	AM	Abderrahmane Bourdim	(Algeria)	10	3	2	1	0	0	11	3	2
6	CM	Dalil Hassen Khodja	(Algeria)	11	7	0	1	1	0	12	8	0
8	AM	Juba Aguieb	(Algeria)	28	19	2	3	2	0	31	21	2
10	AM	Chahreddine Boukholda	(Algeria)	17	10	3	1	1	0	18	11	3
13	DM	Seddik Senhadji	(Algeria)	7	2	0	2	1	0	9	3	0
19	CM	Merouane Dahar	(Algeria)	25	23	5	3	3	1	28	26	6
23	DM	Abdelhafid Benamara	(Algeria)	27	22	0	1	1	0	28	23	0
Forwards
7	RW	Maxwell Baakoh	(Ghana)	12	6	1	1	0	0	13	6	1
9	ST	Karim Aribi	(Algeria)	25	15	1	3	3	2	28	18	3
11	ST	Pa Omar Jobe	(The Gambia)	14	12	2	0	0	0	14	12	2
17	ST	Zoubir Motrani	(Algeria)	20	11	2	0	0	0	20	11	2
18	ST	Mohamed Sylla	(Ivory Coast)	15	5	0	3	2	1	18	7	1
21	RW	Abdelaziz Moulay	(Algeria)	10	10	2	1	1	0	11	11	2
27	LW	Yacine Aliane	(Algeria)	17	13	0	3	1	0	20	14	0
28	ST	Mounir Mahadene	(Algeria)	2	0	0	2	1	0	4	1	0
39	ST	Yacine Goudjil	(Algeria)	6	5	2	0	0	0	6	5	2
48	LW	Mohamed Amran	(Algeria)	4	1	0	0	0	0	4	1	0
Players transferred out during the season
~~25~~	LB	Yanis Hamache	(Algeria)	0	0	0	0	0	0	0	0	0
~~6~~	DM	Aymen Chadli	(Algeria)	1	0	0	0	0	0	1	0	0
~~21~~	RW	Oualid Ardji	(Algeria)	6	1	0	1	1	0	7	2	0
~~11~~	RW	Merouane Boussalem	(Algeria)	13	6	2	0	0	0	13	6	2
~~22~~	DM	Sery Gnoleba	(Ivory Coast)	7	3	0	0	0	0	7	3	0
Total				30		32	3		4	33		36

Last updated: 20 June 2025
Source: mondefootball.fr

=== Goalscorers ===
As of 20 June 2025

Includes all competitive matches.

No.	Nat.	Player	Pos.	L1	AC	TOTAL
19	(Algeria)	Merouane Dahar	CM	5	1	6
10	(Algeria)	Chahreddine Boukholda	AM	3	0	3
11	(The Gambia)	Pa Omar Jobe	ST	3	0	3
9	(Algeria)	Karim Aribi	ST	1	2	3
17	(Algeria)	Zoubir Motrani	ST	2	0	2
8	(Algeria)	Juba Aguieb	AM	2	0	2
4	(Algeria)	Abderrahmane Bourdim	AM	2	0	2
11	(Algeria)	Merouane Boussalem	RW	2	0	2
21	(Algeria)	Abdelaziz Moulay	ST	2	0	2
NA	(Algeria)	Yacine Goudjil	ST	2	0	2
24	(Algeria)	Ahmed Kerroum	CB	2	0	2
3	(Algeria)	Abdelkarim Mammar	CB	1	0	1
29	(Algeria)	Oussama Benatia	RB	1	0	1
5	(Algeria)	Tarek Aggoun	CB	1	0	1
7	(Ghana)	Maxwell Baakoh	RW	1	0	1
18	(Ivory Coast)	Mohamed Sylla	ST	0	1	1
Own Goals				2	0	2
Totals				32	4	36

=== Clean sheets ===
As of 20 June 2025

Includes all competitive matches.

					Clean sheets		
No.	Nat	Name	GP	GA	L 1	AC	Total
1	(Algeria)	Léonard Aggoune	11	13	3	0	0
16	(Algeria)	Chamseddine Rahmani	21	23	8	1	9
30	(Algeria)	Anis Mendil	1	0	1	0	1
		TOTALS		36	12	1	13
