= 2025–26 ES Ben Aknoun season =

ES Ben Aknoun
2025–26 season
- President: Kamel Meberbeche
- Head coach: Mounir Zeghdoud (from 6 July 2025)
- Stadium: 20 August 1955 Stadium
- Ligue 1: 8th
- Algerian Cup: Round of 16
- Top goalscorer: League: Adil Djabout (8 goals); All: Adil Djabout; Abdeljalil Saâd (8 goals)
- Biggest win: ES Ben Aknoun 3–0 ES Mostaganem
- Biggest defeat: CR Belouizdad 3–1 ES Ben Aknoun
Home colours	Away colours

The 2025–26 season, was ES Ben Aknoun's 2nd season in the top flight of Algerian football. In addition to the domestic league, ES Ben Aknoun participated in this season's editions of the Algerian Cup. The Algerian Professional Football League (LFP) officially released the calendar for the 2025–26 Ligue 1 Mobilis season on July 10, 2025.

== Review ==
=== Background ===
ES Ben Aknoun earned promotion back to Ligue 1 Mobilis after a successful season in Ligue 2 Centre-West. The club secured its return on Matchday 28 with a win over RC Arbaâ. Crowned champions with 67 points, the team finished with the best attack, the best defense, and the strongest record both at home and away. Under the guidance of Mohamed Bachir Manaâ, the squad blended young talents with experienced leaders. This promotion, the second in three years, confirms the club's progress as it now aims to establish itself more permanently in Ligue 1. On July 6, 2025, Mounir Zeghdoud was officially appointed as the new head coach of ES Ben Aknoun. The newly promoted club introduced its coach to the media during a press conference.

== Squad list ==
Players and squad numbers last updated on 31 January 2026.
Note: Flags indicate national team as has been defined under FIFA eligibility rules. Players may hold more than one non-FIFA nationality.

No.	Nat.	Name	Position	Date of birth (age)	Signed from
Goalkeepers
1	(Algeria)	Dhayfallah Kadri	GK	12 September 2005 (aged 19)	(Algeria) ES Sétif
16	(Algeria)	Kheireddine Boussouf	GK	7 December 1987 (aged 37)	(Algeria) CS Constantine
30	(Algeria)	Amayas Boudedja	GK	4 January 2005 (aged 20)	(Algeria) Paradou AC
Defenders
2	(Algeria)	Aymen Chaaraoui	RB	26 July 1997 (aged 28)	(Algeria) USM Khenchela
3	(Algeria)	Abdelkader Tamimi	CB	20 March 2001 (aged 24)	(Algeria) ES Mostaganem
4	(Algeria)	Islam Chahrour	CB	20 March 1990 (aged 35)	(Algeria) MC El Bayadh
5	(Algeria)	Hamza Oukali	CB	13 December 1994 (aged 30)	(Algeria) NC Magra
13	(Algeria)	Chemseddine Lakehal	CB	29 February 2000 (aged 25)	(Algeria) NC Magra
15	(Algeria)	Fateh Talah	CB	30 March 1993 (aged 32)	(Algeria) US Biskra
21	(Algeria)	Rafik Brahimi	LB	15 May 1999 (aged 26)	(Algeria) JS Saoura
26	(Algeria)	Wassim Khalouf	LB	26 February 2002 (aged 23)	(Algeria)
27	(Algeria)	Abderahmane Hachoud	RB	2 July 1988 (aged 37)	(Algeria) MC Alger
Midfielders
6	(Algeria)	Massinissa Benchelouche	CM	11 October 2001 (aged 23)	(Algeria) JS Saoura
8	(Algeria)	Alaa Eddine Aissani	CM	1 June 2005 (aged 20)	(Algeria) CR Belouizdad
20	(Algeria)	Aziz Benabdi	DM	9 August 1993 (aged 32)	Free agent
22	(Algeria)	Redouane Bounoua	AM	1 November 1998 (aged 26)	(Algeria) ASO Chlef
23	(Algeria)	Nassim Yattou	DM	23 October 1991 (aged 33)	(Algeria) Paradou AC
29	(Algeria)	Fadi Arrache	DM	15 June 2005 (aged 20)	(Algeria)
Forwards
7	(Algeria)	Adil Djabout	ST	31 December 1992 (aged 32)	(Algeria) NC Magra
9	(Algeria)	Abdeljalil Saâd	ST	12 March 1992 (aged 33)	(Algeria) US Biskra
10	(Algeria)	Badis Bouamama	LW	16 June 2004 (aged 21)	(Algeria) JSM Béjaïa
11	(Algeria)	Ahmed Zaouache	RW	27 May 1998 (aged 27)	(Algeria) RC Arbaâ
14	(Algeria)	Chakib Abri	ST	13 February 2007 (aged 18)	(Algeria) Reserve team
17	(Algeria)	Yanis Allam	ST	11 December 2002 (aged 22)	(Algeria)
19	(Algeria)	Mohamed Souibaâh	ST	25 December 1991 (aged 33)	(Algeria) JS Saoura
24	(Ivory Coast)	Mohamed Sylla	ST	12 November 2001 (aged 23)	(Algeria) MC Oran
25	(Algeria)	Mohamed El Amine Hammia	LW	21 December 1991 (aged 33)	(Algeria) JS Saoura

== Transfers ==
=== In ===
==== Summer ====
Date	Pos	Player	Moving from	Fee	Source
17 July 2025	GK	(Algeria) Kheireddine Boussouf	CS Constantine	Free transfer	
27 July 2025	DM	(Algeria) Nassim Yattou	Paradou AC	Free transfer	
27 July 2025	ST	(Algeria) Abdeljalil Saâd	US Biskra	Free transfer	
27 July 2025	CB	(Algeria) Aymen Chaaraoui	USM Khenchela	Free transfer	
27 July 2025	ST	(Algeria) Mohamed Souibaâh	JS Saoura	Free transfer	
27 July 2025	ST	(Algeria) Adil Djabout	NC Magra	Free transfer	
1 August 2025	CB	(Algeria) Fateh Talah	US Biskra	Free transfer	
12 August 2025	CB	(Algeria) Abdelkader Tamimi	ES Mostaganem	Free transfer	

==== Winter ====
Date	Pos	Player	Moving from	Fee	Source
31 January 2026	LW	(Algeria) Mohamed El Amine Hammia	Unattached	Free transfer	
31 January 2026	LB	(Algeria) Rafik Brahimi	JS Saoura	Free transfer	
31 January 2026	ST	(Algeria) Amayas Boudedja	Paradou AC	Free transfer	

=== Out ===
==== Summer ====
Date	Pos	Player	Moving to	Fee	Source
29 July 2025	MF	(Algeria) Kamel Belarbi	MO Béjaïa	Free transfer	

==== Winter ====
Date	Pos	Player	Moving to	Fee	Source
19 January 2026	GK	(Algeria) Yanis Bentchakal	Unattached	Free transfer (Released)	
31 January 2026	GK	(Algeria) Mohamed Messaoud Salem	JS Djijel	Free transfer	

== Pre-season and friendlies ==
7 August 2025 Friendly	USM Blida	1–0	ES Ben Aknoun	Blida
18:30 UTC+1		Report		Stadium: Mustapha Tchaker Stadium

12 August 2025 Friendly	ES Ben Aknoun	2–0	Olympique de Médéa	Ben Aknoun
17:30 UTC+1	Souibaâh 18'; Bouamama	Report		Stadium: Stade El Mokrani

13 August 2025 Friendly	JS El Biar	1–3	ES Ben Aknoun	El Biar
9:30 UTC+1		Report	Bouamama; Abdeljalil Saâd	Stadium: Stade Abderrahmane Ibrir

== Competitions ==
=== Overview ===
Competition	Record								Started round	Final position / round	First match	Last match
Competition	G	W	D	L	GF	GA	GD	Win %	Started round	Final position / round	First match	Last match
Ligue 1	30	11	10	9	41	39	+2	36.67	—N/a	8th	21 August 2025	In Progress
Algerian Cup	3	2	0	1	4	1	+3	66.67	Round of 64	Round of 16	6 December 2025	13 January 2026
Total	33	13	10	10	45	40	+5	39.39				

Updated to match played 6 June 2026
Source: Competitions

=== Ligue 1 ===
==== League table ====
Pos	Team	Pld	W	D	L	GF	GA	GD	Pts	Qualification or relegation
6	Olympique Akbou	30	12	9	9	34	31	+3	45	
7	USM Khenchela	30	12	8	10	37	37	0	44	
8	ES Ben Aknoun	30	11	10	9	41	39	+2	43	
9	CS Constantine	30	11	10	9	35	30	+5	43	
10	USM Alger (Note: USM Alger qualified for the 2026–27 CAF Confederation Cup by winning the 2025–26 Algerian Cup)	30	8	15	7	34	29	+5	39	Qualification for CAF Confederation Cup

Source: lfp.dz
Rules for classification: 1) Points; 2) Head-to-head points; 3) Head-to-head goal difference; 4) First half goal difference; 5) First half total goals; 6) Fairplay ranking; 7) Playoff.

==== Results summary ====
Overall								Home						Away					
Pld	W	D	L	GF	GA	GD	Pts	W	D	L	GF	GA	GD	W	D	L	GF	GA	GD
30	11	10	9	41	39	+2	43	7	4	4	23	19	+4	4	6	5	18	20	−2

Last updated: 6 June 2026.
Source: Competitive matches

==== Results by round ====
Round	1	2	3	4	5	6	7	8	9	10	11	12	13	14	15	16	17	18	19	20	21	22	23	24	25	26	27	28	29	30
Ground	A	H	A	H	A	H	A	H	A	H	A	H	A	H	A	H	A	H	A	H	A	H	A	H	A	H	A	H	A	H
Result	L	D	L	W	D	D	W	W	D	L	W	L	D	W	D	W	L	L	W	L	L	W	D	W	W	W	L	D	W	D
Position	12	11	13	13	13	12	9	6	8	9	7	8	11	9	10	5	9	9	9	9	10	10	8	8	8	7	8	9	8	8

Updated to match(es) played on 6 June 2026. Source: Competitive matches
A = Away; H = Home; W = Win; D = Draw; L = Loss

==== Matches ====
The league fixtures were announced on 31 July 2025.

All times are local, WAT (UTC+1).

Win Draw Loss Postponed

21 August 2025 Round 1	MC Oran	2–1	ES Ben Aknoun	Bir El Djir
18:00	Moulay 60'; Boukholda 65'	Soccerway; LFP	Mammar 54' (o.g.)	Stadium: Miloud Hadefi Stadium; Attendance: 0 (close doors); Referee: Houiya Dhekra; VAR: Mehdi Oukil

31 August 2025 Round 2	ES Ben Aknoun	1–1	JS Kabylie	Belouizdad
17:00	Saâd 45+6'	Soccerway; LFP	Boudebouz 37'	Stadium: 20 August 1955 Stadium; Referee: Mustapha Ghorbal; VAR: Yahia Dehar

12 September 2025 Round 4	ES Ben Aknoun	1–0	Paradou AC	Belouizdad
16:00	Saâd 21'	Soccerway; LFP		Stadium: 20 August 1955 Stadium; Referee: Houssam Benyahia; VAR: Alaa Bouab

20 September 2025 Round 5	USM Khenchela	1–1	ES Ben Aknoun	Khenchela
16:00	Boumechra 61'	Soccerway; LFP	Hachoud 85'	Stadium: Amar Hamam Stadium; Referee: Tahar Boudjemaa

27 September 2025 Round 6	ES Ben Aknoun	1–1	JS Saoura	Belouizdad
16:00	Hachoud 39'	Soccerway; LFP	Boutiche 26'	Stadium: 20 August 1955 Stadium; Referee: Fateh Harkat; VAR: Akram Mechairia

4 October 2025 Round 7	MC El Bayadh	1–2	ES Ben Aknoun	El Bayadh
15:00	Amokrane 81'	Soccerway; LFP	Hachoud 13'; Djabout 58'	Stadium: Zakaria Medjdoub Stadium; Referee: Haitham Ghouti; VAR: Rafik Aouina

18 October 2025 Round 8	ES Ben Aknoun	1–0	CS Constantine	Belouizdad
15:00	Lakehal 76'	Soccerway; LFP		Stadium: 20 August 1955 Stadium; Referee: Nabil Boukhalfa

25 October 2025 Round 9	MB Rouissat	0–0	ES Ben Aknoun	Ouargla
18:00		Soccerway; LFP		Stadium: 18 February Stadium; Referee: Akram Mechairia

2 November 2025 Round 10	ES Ben Aknoun	0–1	ES Sétif	Belouizdad
14:30		Soccerway; LFP	Djahnit 90+4'	Stadium: 20 August 1955 Stadium; Referee: Houssam Benyahia

9 November 2025 Round 11	ASO Chlef	1–2	ES Ben Aknoun	Chlef
17:45	Ledlum 49'	Soccerway; LFP	Souibaâh 26'; Oukali 90+7'	Stadium: Mohamed Boumezrag Stadium; Referee: Youcef Taieb Bouderbal

18 December 2025 Round 13	USM Alger	2–2	ES Ben Aknoun	Algiers
20:00	Khaldi 19'; Loucif 45+2'	Soccerway; LFP	Saâd 27'; Oukali 69'	Stadium: Stade du 5 Juillet; Referee: Lotfi Bekouassa

23 December 2025 Round 3	MC Alger	1–0	ES Ben Aknoun	Douéra
19:30	Ghezala 56' (pen.)	Soccerway; LFP		Stadium: Ali La Pointe Stadium; Referee: Alaa Bouab

29 December 2025 Round 14	ES Mostaganem	0–1	ES Ben Aknoun	Sidi Ali
14:00		Soccerway; LFP	Djabout 87'	Stadium: Larbi Belhamiti Stadium; Referee: Nabil Boukhalfa

3 January 2026 Round 12	ES Ben Aknoun	0–2	CR Belouizdad	Belouizdad
14:00		Soccerway; LFP	Benguit 80'; Ben Hammouda 89'	Stadium: 20 August 1955 Stadium; Referee: Tayeb Benyebka

8 January 2026 Round 15	ES Ben Aknoun	2–2	Olympique Akbou	Belouizdad
14:00	Lakehal 33'; Talah 52'	Soccerway; LFP	Gherbi 45+7'; Hitala 82'	Stadium: 20 August 1955 Stadium; Referee: Haitham Ghouti

24 January 2026 Round 16	ES Ben Aknoun	2–1	MC Oran	Belouizdad
14:00	Sylla 12'; Hachoud 37'	Soccerway; LFP	Bourdim 42'	Stadium: 20 August 1955 Stadium; Referee: Akram Mechairia

14 February 2026 Round 19	Paradou AC	3–5	ES Ben Aknoun	Belouizdad
15:00	Kermiche 11'; Abdelkader 47', 51'	Soccerway; LFP	Bouamama 40', 45+1', 79'; Saâd 43'; Djabout 90+1'	Stadium: 20 August 1955 Stadium; Referee: Lahlou Benbraham

21 February 2026 Round 20	ES Ben Aknoun	2–3	USM Khenchela	Belouizdad
14:30	Lakehal 90'; Djabout 90+6'	Soccerway; LFP	Boumechra 56'; Etouga 59'; Djaouchi 90+4'	Stadium: 20 August 1955 Stadium; Referee: Rafik Aouina

27 February 2026 Round 21	JS Saoura	1–0	ES Ben Aknoun	Béchar
22:00	Fettouhi 66'	Soccerway; LFP		Stadium: 20 August 1955 Stadium; Referee: Abdellali Ibrir

7 March 2026 Round 22	ES Ben Aknoun	1–0	MC El Bayadh	Belouizdad
15:00	Sylla 18'	Soccerway; LFP		Stadium: 20 August 1955 Stadium; Referee: Tayeb Benyebka

13 March 2026 Round 23	CS Constantine	0–0	ES Ben Aknoun	Constantine
22:00		Soccerway; LFP		Stadium: Chahid Hamlaoui Stadium; Referee: Yahia Dahar

18 March 2026 Round 24	ES Ben Aknoun	3–2	MB Rouissat	Belouizdad
15:00	Hachoud 13' (pen.), 82'; Saâd 31'	Soccerway; LFP	Merzougui 59' (pen.), 69'	Stadium: 20 August 1955 Stadium; Referee: Youcef Taieb Bouderbal

1 April 2026 Round 17	JS Kabylie	3–1	ES Ben Aknoun	Tizi Ouzou
16:00	Boudebouz 14' (pen.); Tichtich 24'; Akhrib 88'	Soccerway; LFP	Saâd 27'	Stadium: Hocine Aït Ahmed Stadium; Referee: Tahar Boudjemaa

5 April 2026 Round 25	ES Sétif	1–1	ES Ben Aknoun	Sétif
17:45	Boubekeur 14'	Soccerway; LFP	Djabout 12'	Stadium: 8 May 1945 Stadium; Referee: Lahlou Benbraham

10 April 2026 Round 26	ES Ben Aknoun	2–1	ASO Chlef	Belouizdad
16:00	Djabout 1'; Sylla 45+2'	Soccerway; LFP	Bekkouche 65'	Stadium: 20 August 1955 Stadium; Referee: Fateh Harkat

21 April 2026 Round 18	ES Ben Aknoun	2–3	MC Alger	Belouizdad
16:00	Lakehal 14'; Djabout 56'	Soccerway; LFP	Ferhat 51', 90+1'; Bayazid 90+5'	Stadium: 20 August 1955 Stadium; Referee: Anes Azrine

19 May 2026 Round 29	ES Ben Aknoun	3–0	ES Mostaganem	Belouizdad
16:00	Brahimi 4'; Souibaâh 32'; Zaouache 46'	Soccerway; LFP		Stadium: 20 August 1955 Stadium; Referee: Ghada Mehat

24 May 2026 Round 27	CR Belouizdad	3–1	ES Ben Aknoun	Baraki
20:00	Laouafi 25', 34', 41'	Soccerway; LFP	Talah 11'	Stadium: Nelson Mandela Stadium; Referee: Ayoub Belhachemi

4 June 2026 Round 28	ES Ben Aknoun	2–2	USM Alger	Belouizdad
17:00	Djabout 52'; Hachoud 83'	Soccerway; LFP	Bayoud 29'; Khaldi 89'	Stadium: 20 August 1955 Stadium; Referee: Anes Azrine

6 June 2026 Round 30	Olympique Akbou	1–1	ES Ben Aknoun	Béjaïa
17:00	Zamoum 59'	Soccerway; LFP	Saâd 77'	Stadium: Maghrebi Unity Stadium; Referee: Naïm Bouara

=== Algerian Cup ===
6 December 2025 Round of 64	ES Ben Aknoun	2–0	RA Aïn Defla	Dar El Beïda
14:00	Tamimi 50'; Saâd 73'	Report		Stadium: Omar Benrabah Stadium; Referee: Dhikra Houia

13 December 2025 Round of 32	ES Ben Aknoun	2–0	ESF Bir El Ater	Dar El Beïda
14:00	Chahrour 52'; Zaouache 82'	Report		Stadium: Omar Benrabah Stadium; Referee: Ayoub Belhachemi

13 January 2026 Round of 16	MC Alger	1–0 (a.e.t.)	ES Ben Aknoun	Douéra
19:00	Chahrour 96' (o.g.)	Report		Stadium: Ali La Pointe Stadium; Referee: Tahar Boudjemaa

== Squad information ==
=== Appearances and goals ===
As of 6 June 2025

No.	Pos	Player	Nat	Ligue 1			Algerian Cup			Total		
No.	Pos	Player	Nat	App	St	G	App	St	G	App	St	G
Goalkeepers
1	GK	Dhayfallah Kadri	(Algeria)	1	1	0	2	2	0	3	3	0
16	GK	Kheireddine Boussouf	(Algeria)	27	27	0	2	1	0	29	28	0
30	GK	Amayas Boudedja	(Algeria)	1	1	0	0	0	0	1	1	0
Defenders
2	RB	Aymen Chaaraoui	(Algeria)	27	27	0	3	3	0	30	30	0
3	CB	Abdelkader Tamimi	(Algeria)	20	19	0	2	2	1	22	21	1
4	CB	Islam Chahrour	(Algeria)	20	17	0	2	2	1	22	19	1
5	CB	Hamza Oukali	(Algeria)	21	12	2	1	1	0	22	13	2
13	CB	Chemseddine Lakehal	(Algeria)	27	23	5	0	0	0	27	23	5
15	CB	Fateh Talah	(Algeria)	20	19	2	3	3	0	23	22	2
21	LB	Rafik Brahimi	(Algeria)	10	8	1	0	0	0	10	8	1
26	CB	Wassim Khalouf	(Algeria)	2	0	0	1	1	0	3	1	0
27	RB	Abderahmane Hachoud	(Algeria)	26	26	7	2	1	0	28	27	7
31	RB	Mohamed Sari	(Algeria)	0	0	0	1	0	0	1	0	0
Midfielders
6	CM	Massinissa Benchelouche	(Algeria)	21	9	0	3	1	0	24	10	0
8	CM	Alaa Eddine Aissani	(Algeria)	1	0	0	0	0	0	0	0	0
9	AM	Abdeljalil Saâd	(Algeria)	29	24	7	2	1	1	31	25	8
20	DM	Aziz Benabdi	(Algeria)	15	13	0	2	2	0	17	15	0
22	AM	Redouane Bounoua	(Algeria)	7	4	0	0	0	0	7	4	0
23	DM	Nassim Yattou	(Algeria)	21	14	0	2	2	0	23	16	0
29	DM	Fadi Arrache	(Algeria)	0	0	0	1	1	0	1	1	0
32	CM	Mohmed Belouchat	(Algeria)	0	0	0	1	1	0	0	0	0
Forwards
7	ST	Adil Djabout	(Algeria)	29	16	8	3	1	0	32	17	8
10	LW	Badis Bouamama	(Algeria)	23	16	3	2	1	0	25	17	3
11	RW	Ahmed Zaouache	(Algeria)	29	23	1	2	1	1	31	24	2
14	ST	Chakib Abri	(Algeria)	0	0	0	0	0	0	0	0	0
17	ST	Yanis Allam	(Algeria)	2	0	0	1	0	0	3	0	0
19	ST	Mohamed Souibaâh	(Algeria)	23	8	1	3	2	0	26	10	1
24	ST	Mohamed Sylla	(Ivory Coast)	19	10	3	1	1	0	20	11	3
25	LW	Mohamed El Amine Hammia	(Algeria)	9	1	0	0	0	0	9	1	0
33	RW	Mohmed Medjber	(Algeria)	0	0	0	2	1	0	0	0	0
Players transferred out during the season
~~30~~	GK	Yanis Bentchakal	(Algeria)	1	1	0	0	0	0	1	1	0
~~21~~	LW	Mohamed Messaoud Salem	(Algeria)	10	1	0	2	1	0	12	2	0
Total				30		41	2		4	32		45

Last updated: 6 June 2026
Source: soccerway.com

=== Goalscorers ===
As of 6 June 2026

Includes all competitive matches.

No.	Nat.	Player	Pos.	L1	AC	TOTAL
7	(Algeria)	Adil Djabout	ST	8	0	8
9	(Algeria)	Abdeljalil Saâd	AM	7	1	8
27	(Algeria)	Abderahmane Hachoud	RB	7	0	7
13	(Algeria)	Chemseddine Lakehal	CB	4	0	4
10	(Algeria)	Badis Bouamama	LW	3	0	3
24	(Ivory Coast)	Mohamed Sylla	ST	3	0	3
5	(Algeria)	Hamza Oukali	CB	2	0	2
19	(Algeria)	Mohamed Souibaâh	ST	2	0	2
11	(Algeria)	Ahmed Zaouache	RW	1	1	2
15	(Algeria)	Fateh Talah	CB	2	0	2
3	(Algeria)	Abdelkader Tamimi	CB	0	1	1
4	(Algeria)	Islam Chahrour	CB	0	1	1
21	(Algeria)	Rafik Brahimi	LB	1	0	1
Own Goals				1	0	1
Totals				41	4	45

=== Clean sheets ===
As of 6 June 2026

Includes all competitive matches.

					Clean sheets		
No.	Nat	Name	GP	GA	L1	AC	Total
1	(Algeria)	Dhayfallah Kadri	3	0	1	2	3
16	(Algeria)	Kheireddine Boussouf	28	37	6	1	7
30	(Algeria)	Amayas Boudedja	1	1	0	0	0
Players transferred out during the season
~~30~~	(Algeria)	Yanis Bentchakal	1	2	0	0	0
		TOTALS		40	7	3	10
