= 2017–18 Independence Cup (Bangladesh) =

Tournament details
- Country: Bangladesh
- Dates: 16 January – 10 February 2018
- Teams: 12

Final positions
- Champions: Arambagh KS (1st title)
- Runners-up: Chittagong Abahani

Tournament statistics
- Matches played: 19
- Goals scored: 38 (2 per match)
- Top goal scorer(s): 3 Goals (Bangladesh) Mohammad Jewel (Arambagh KS)

Awards
- Best player: (Bangladesh) Mohammad Arifur Rahman (Arambagh KS)

The 2017–18 Independence Cup was the 10th edition of the Independence Cup association football tournament in Bangladesh. It was known as the Walton Independence Cup 2017–18 for sponsorship reasons.

A total of 12 teams competed beginning 16 January 2018. Only local players are eligible to play.

Chittagong Abahani won the previous edition of the tournament.

== Venues ==
Dhaka
Bangabandhu National Stadium
Capacity: 36,000
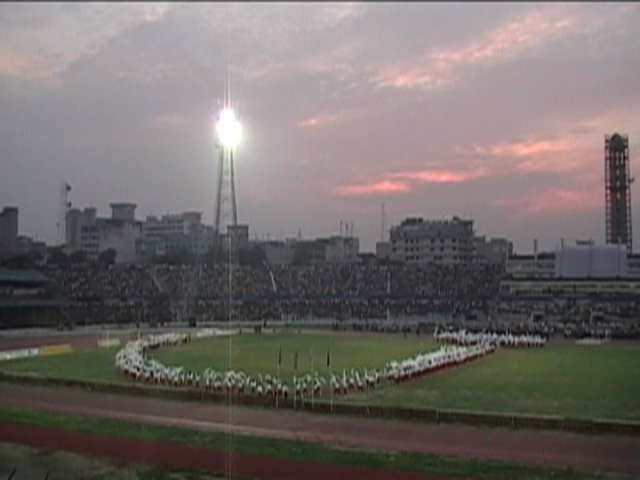

== Draw ==
The draw ceremony of the tournament was held the BFF house Motijheel, Dhaka on 11 January 2018. The twelve participants were divided into four groups, and the top two teams from each groups advanced to the quarter-finals.

== Group stages ==
- All matches played at Dhaka
- Time Listed are UTC+6:00

Key to colours in group tables
Group Winners and Runners-up advance to the Quarter-Finals

=== Group A ===
Pos	Team	Pld	W	D	L	GF	GA	GD	Pts	Qualification
1	Sheikh Jamal Dhanmondi Club	2	0	2	0	3	3	0	2	Advance to Quarter-finals
2	Rahmatganj MFS	2	0	2	0	2	2	0	2	Advance to Quarter-finals
3	Mohammedan SC	2	0	2	0	1	1	0	2	

Updated to match(es) played on 17 January 2018. Source: ScoreBing

17 January 2018
17:45

Sheikh Jamal Dhanmondi Club	1–1	Mohammedan SC
Nurul Absar 35'	Report	Zahid Hasan Ameli 57'

Bangabandhu National Stadium, Dhaka
19 January 2018
17:45

Rahmatganj MFS	0–0	Mohammedan SC
	Report

Bangabandhu National Stadium, Dhaka

24 January 2018
17:45

Sheikh Jamal Dhanmondi Club	2–2	Rahmatganj MFS
Jabed Khan 39'; Rakib Sarkar 67'	Report	Rashedul Shuvo 62'; Mohamed Elias 79'

Bangabandhu National Stadium, Dhaka

=== Group B ===
Pos	Team	Pld	W	D	L	GF	GA	GD	Pts	Qualification
1	Farashganj SC	2	1	1	0	3	2	+1	4	Advance to Quarter-Finals
2	Brothers Union	2	1	0	1	2	2	0	3	Advance to Quarter-Finals
3	Muktijoddha Sangsad KC	2	0	1	1	1	2	−1	1	

Updated to match(es) played on 20 January 2018. Source: ScoreBing

16 January 2018
17:30

Brothers Union	1–2	Farashganj SC
Bishal Das 89'	Report	Forhad Mona 22', 84'

Bangabandhu National Stadium, Dhaka

18 January 2018
17:45

Farashganj SC	1–1	Muktijoddha Sangsad KC
Mohamed Alamgir 25'	Report	Amirul Islam 47'

Bangabandhu National Stadium, Dhaka

20 January 2018
16:00

Brothers Union	1–0	Muktijoddha Sangsad KC
Bishal Das 20'	Report

Bangabandhu National Stadium, Dhaka

=== Group C ===
Pos	Team	Pld	W	D	L	GF	GA	GD	Pts	Qualification
1	Abahani Limited Dhaka	2	2	0	0	3	0	+3	6	Advance to Quarter-Finals
2	Sheikh Russel KC	2	1	0	1	2	2	0	3	Advance to Quarter-Finals
3	Team BJMC	2	0	0	2	1	4	−3	0	

Updated to match(es) played on 25 January 2018. Source: ScoreBing

17 January 2018
17:45

Abahani Limited Dhaka	2–0	Team BJMC
Nabib Newaj Jibon 24'; Atiqur Rahman Fahad 83'	Report

Bangabandhu National Stadium, Dhaka

19 January 2018
15:15

Sheikh Russel KC	2–1	Team BJMC
Mehebub Hasan Nayon 80'; Sobuj Biswas 93'	Report	Mohamed Hedayetullah Robin 87'

Bangabandhu National Stadium, Dhaka

25 January 2018
15:45

Abahani Limited Dhaka	1–0	Sheikh Russel KC
Sobuj Biswas (o.g.)	Report

Bangabandhu National Stadium, Dhaka

=== Group D ===
Pos	Team	Pld	W	D	L	GF	GA	GD	Pts	Qualification
1	Chittagong Abahani	2	0	2	0	2	2	0	2	Advance to Quarter-Finals
2	Arambagh KS	2	0	2	0	1	1	0	2	Advance to Quarter-Finals
3	Saif Sporting Club	2	0	2	0	1	1	0	2	

Updated to match(es) played on 26 January 2018. Source: ScoreBing

16 January 2018
15:30

Saif Sporting Club	1–1	Chittagong Abahani
Jewel Rana		Masuk Mia Jony

Bangabandhu National Stadium, Dhaka

18 January 2018
15:30

Saif Sporting Club	0–0	Arambagh KS

Bangabandhu National Stadium, Dhaka

26 January 2018
15:45

Chittagong Abahani	1–1	Arambagh KS
Tawhidul Alam Sabuz 90+3'	Report	Mohammad Jewel 51'

Bangabandhu National Stadium, Dhaka

== Bracket ==
Quarter-finals
Sheikh Jamal DC	2
Brothers Union	0
Farashganj SC	0
Rahmatganj MFS	1
Abahani Limited Dhaka	0
Arambagh KS	3
Chittagong Abahani	4
Sheikh Russel KC	3

Semi-finals
Sheikh Jamal DC	0
Arambagh KS	1
Rahmatganj MFS	0
Chittagong Abahani	1

Final
Arambagh KS	2
Chittagong Abahani	0

== Quarter-finals ==
27 January 2018
16:00. BDST

Sheikh Jamal Dhanmondi Club	2–0	Brothers Union
Nurul Absar 55'; Zahid Parvez Chowdhury 83'

Bangabandhu National Stadium, Dhaka

28 January 2018
16:00 BDST

Farashganj SC	0–1	Rahmatganj MFS
		Khalequzzaman Sabuj 50' (o.g.)

Bangabandhu National Stadium, Dhaka

2 February 2018
16:00 BDST

Abahani Limited Dhaka	0–3	Arambagh KS
	Report	Mahbubur Rahman Sufil 62'; Mohammad Jewel 81'; Shahriar Bappy 85'

Bangabandhu National Stadium, Dhaka

3 February 2018
16:00 BDST

Chittagong Abahani	4–2	Sheikh Russel KC
Tawhidul Alam Sabuz 9'; Sohel Rana 18'; Mohammad Abdullah 42'; Shakhawat Hossain Rony 44'		Mehebub Hasan Nayon 12'; Mohammad Javed 73'

Bangabandhu National Stadium, Dhaka

== Semi-finals ==
5 February 2018
16:00 BDST

Sheikh Jamal Dhanmondi Club	0–1	Arambagh KS
		Mohammad Jewel 90'

Bangabandhu National Stadium, Dhaka

6 February 2018
16:00 BDST

Rahmatganj MFS	0–1	Chittagong Abahani
		Shakhawat Hossain Rony 45+2' (pen.)

Bangabandhu National Stadium, Dhaka

== Final ==
10 February 2018
16:00 BST

Arambagh KS	2–0	Chittagong Abahani
Mohammad Arifur Rahman 20'; Mohammad Rockey 45'

Bangabandhu National Stadium, Dhaka
Attendance: 12,410
Referee: Iqbal Chowdhury (Bangladesh)

== Goalscorers ==
There were 38 goals scored in 19 matches, for an average of 2 goals per match.

3 goals

- (Bangladesh) Mohammad Jewel (Arambagh KS)

2 goals

- (Bangladesh) Shakhawat Hossain Rony (Chittagong Abahani)
- (Bangladesh) Nurul Absar (Sheikh Jamal Dhanmondi Club)
- (Bangladesh) Bishal Das (Brothers Union)
- (Bangladesh) Forhad Mona (Farashganj SC)
- (Bangladesh) Tawhidul Alam Sabuz (Chittagong Abahani)
- (Bangladesh) Mehebub Hasan Nayon (Sheikh Russel KC)

1 goal

- (Bangladesh) Zahid Parvez Chowdhury (Sheikh Jamal Dhanmondi Club)
- (Bangladesh) Mahbubur Rahman Sufil (Arambagh KS)
- (Bangladesh) Shahriar Bappy (Arambagh KS)
- (Bangladesh) Sohel Rana (Chittagong Abahani)
- (Bangladesh) Mohammad Abdullah (Chittagong Abahani)
- (Bangladesh) Mohammad Javed (Sheikh Russel KC)
- (Bangladesh) Mohammad Arifur Rahman (Arambagh KS)
- (Bangladesh) Zahid Hasan Ameli (Mohammedan SC)
- (Bangladesh) Jabed Khan (Sheikh Jamal Dhanmondi Club)
- (Bangladesh) Rakib Sarkar (Sheikh Jamal Dhanmondi Club)
- (Bangladesh) Rashedul Shuvo (Rahmatganj MFS)
- (Bangladesh) Mohamed Elias (Rahmatganj MFS)
- (Bangladesh) Nabib Newaj Jibon (Abahani Limited Dhaka)
- (Bangladesh) Atiqur Rahman Fahad (Abahani Limited Dhaka)
- (Bangladesh) Sobuj Biswas (Sheikh Russel KC)
- (Bangladesh) Mohamed Hedayetullah Robin Team BJMC
- (Bangladesh) Mohamed Alamgir (Farashganj SC)
- (Bangladesh) Amirul Islam (Muktijoddha Sangsad KC)
- (Bangladesh) Masuk Mia Jony (Chittagong Abahani)
- (Bangladesh) Jewel Rana (Saif Sporting Club)
- (Bangladesh) Mohammad Rockey (Arambagh KS)

2 own goals

- (Bangladesh) Sobuj Biswas (against Abahani Limited Dhaka)
- (Bangladesh) Khalekurzaman Sabuj (against Farashganj SC)
