= Pa Omar Jobe =

Gambian footballer

Personal information
- Full name: Pa Omar Jobe
- Date of birth: 26 December 1998 (age 27)
- Place of birth: Yundum, The Gambia
- Height: 1.85 m (6 ft 1 in)
- Position: Forward

Team information
- Current team: Club Sportif de Hammam-Lif

Senior career*
Years	Team	Apps	(Gls)
2011–2014	Tallinding United		
2014–2017	Real de Banjul	2	(0)
2017–2019	ASEC Ndiambour		
2019–2021	Sheikh Jamal	32	(26)
2022	Shkëndija	0	(0)
2022	→ Struga (loan)	12	(3)
2022–2023	Neman Grodno	2	(0)
2023	Zhenis	25	(13)
2024	Simba	5	(2)
2024	Çetinkaya Türk	9	(1)
2025	MC Oran	20	(3)
2026-	Club Sportif de Hammam-Lif	0	(0)

International career^{‡}
2017	Gambia	2	(0)
- * Club domestic league appearances and goals as of 25 August 2026 ‡ National team caps and goals as of 22 July 2017

Pa Omar Jobe (born 26 December 1998) is a Gambian professional footballer who plays as a forward. He was a member of Gambia national team.

On 15 January 2024, it was finally announced that Pa Omar Jobe has been signed to Simba Sports Club in a contract of two years

== Club career ==
=== Sheikh Jamal Dhanmondi ===
On 27 January 2021, Omar scored the first hattrick of 2021 Bangladesh Premier League, scoring four goals against Arambagh.

=== KF Shkendija ===
After a successful couple of seasons in Bangladesh, Jobe signed for Macedonian side KF Shkendija on a free transfer but failed to break into the first team and was promptly loaned out to fellow Macedonian side Struga for the remainder of the season.

=== FC Struga Trim Lum ===
Jobe featured regularly for FC Struga whilst on loan regaining form and scoring 3 goals in 12 appearances. Jobe returned to KF Shkendija at the end of his loan spell but was released at the end of the season.

=== FC Neman Grodno ===
After Jobe’s release he signed for Belarusian side FC Neman Grodno. He only managed two appearances failing to score. But featured frequently for Neman Grodno’s second team scoring regularly, including 4 goals against FC Vitebsk’s second team. He was again released at the end of the season.

=== FC Zhenis ===
Following his release from Neman Grodno Jobe joined Kazakhstani Second Division side FC Zhenis. Jobe amassed 13 goals in 25 appearances. He left FC Zhenis upon the expiry of his contract.
