= Mohammad Jewel =

Bangladeshi footballer

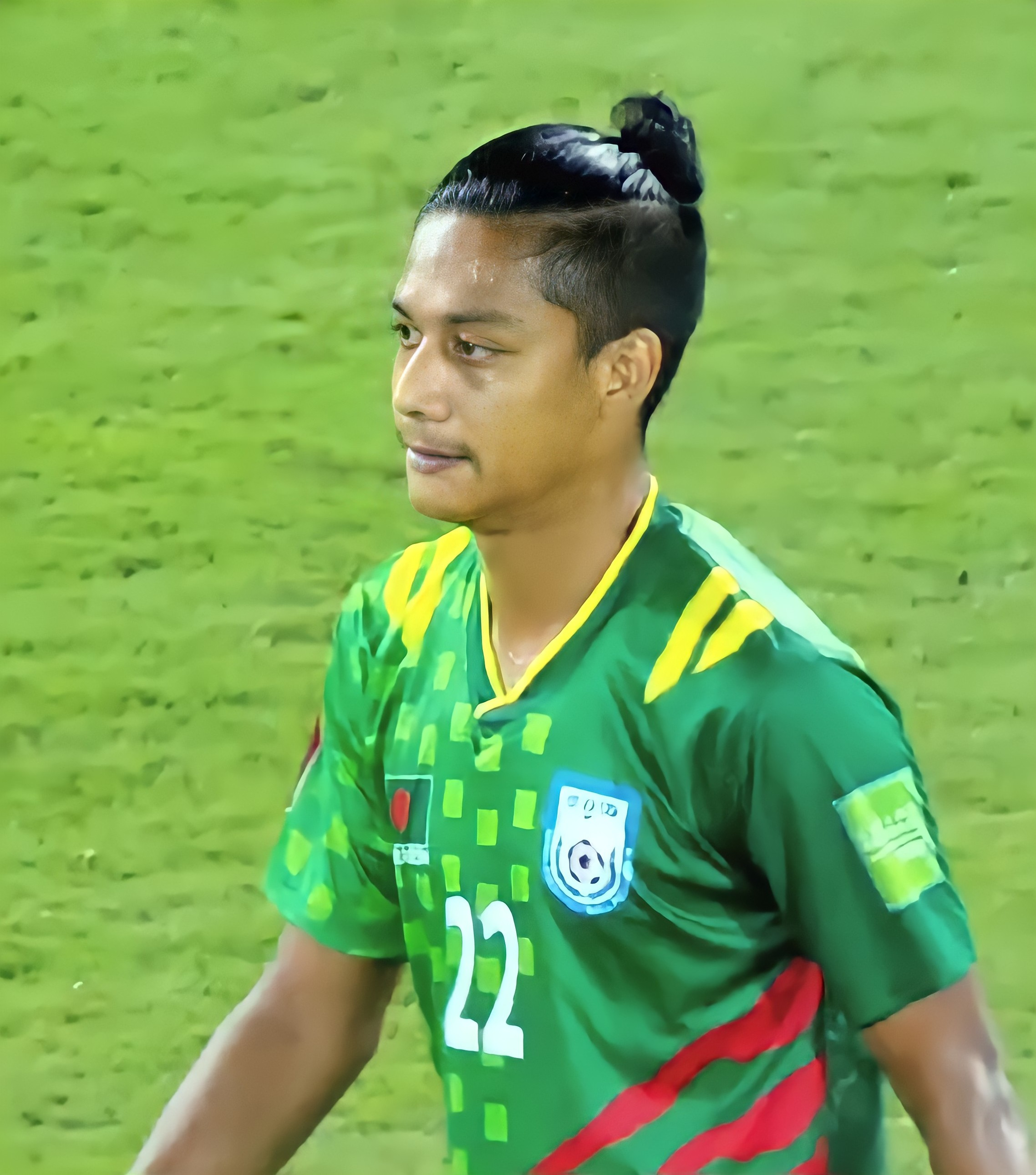
- Jewel with Bangladesh in 2021

Personal information
- Full name: Mohammad Mahbubur Rahman Jewel
- Date of birth: 17 February 2001 (age 25)
- Place of birth: Dhaka, Bangladesh.
- Height: 1.70 m (5 ft 7 in)
- Position: Forward

Youth career
- 2013–2014: BKSP
- 2014–2015: Bangladesh Ansar FT

Senior career*
Years	Team	Apps	(Gls)
2016–2017	Fakirerpool YMC	14	(4)
2017–2019	Arambagh KS	20	(1)
2019–2021	Bangladesh Police	18	(4)
2021–2022	Sheikh Russel KC	20	(5)
2022–2023	Sheikh Jamal DC	0	(0)

International career^{‡}
2013–2015	Bangladesh U16	0	(0)
2021	Bangladesh	2	(0)
Medal record
Representing Bangladesh
SAFF U-16 Championship
Bronze medal – third place	2013 Nepal	Team
SAFF U-15 Championship
Winner	2015 Bangladesh	Team
- * Club domestic league appearances and goals as of 22 July 2023 ‡ National team caps and goals as of 12 March 2022

Mohammad Mahbubur Rahman Jewel (Bengali: মোহাম্মদ মাহবুবুর রহমান জুয়েল) is a Bangladeshi footballer who last played as a forward for Sheikh Jamal Dhanmondi Club and the Bangladesh national team. As a versatile forward, he can operate as a centre forward, second striker or winger.

== Club career ==
=== Early career ===
Jewel started football training under Ibrahim Khalil, a local coach, in his early age. He trained alongside Sohel Rana and Pappu Hossain. In 2013, he got admitted in Bangladesh Krira Shikkha Protishtan by passing the exam. He played in many tournaments in Bangladesh and India for BKSP youth team.

Jewel played in 2015 Pioneer Football League, country's grassroot youth league, for Bangladesh Ansar FC. He played a vital role in making his team champion as he was the Most Valuable Player and top scorer of the league. He scored total 22 goals in the league including one in the final match.

=== Fakirerpool YMC ===
In 2016, Jewel joined Bangladesh Championship League side Fakirerpool Young Men's Club, after playing in sixth tier Pioneer League. He found the net four times as Fakirerpool became champions that season.

=== Arambagh KS ===
In 2017, Jewel signed for top-tier side Arambagh KS, a club which is well known in the country for producing young talents. He scored 3 goals to become the top scorer of 2017–18 Independence Cup and helped his team Arambagh to clinch their first-ever domestic silverware. On 12 September 2017, Jewel scored his first goal in the Bangladesh Premier League against Farashganj SC in his team's 2–1 win.

=== Bangladesh Police ===
In 2019, Jewel signed for newly promoted top-tier club Bangladesh Police. He struggled in the first season with Police as he couldn't make any appearance. However, he became a starter from the beginning of the 2020–21 season under new head coach Pakir Ali. He made his debut for Police on 24 December 2020 in a Federation Cup match. On 22 February 2021, he scored his first goal for Police against giants Sheikh Jamal Dhanmondi in the 2020–21 BPL. On 7 May 2021, he scored a brace against Uttar Baridhara and helped his team to make a comeback from 1–0 down. He finished the 2020–21 BPL season with 4 goals and 3 assists in 18 league games.

=== Sheikh Russel KC ===
On 24 October 2021, Jewel got his big move to Sheikh Russel KC. On 27 November 2021, he made his debut for the club during a 1–0 over Uttar Baridhara in the 2021 Independence Cup opening group-stage game. On 9 February 2022, Jewel scored his first goal for the club, during a league game against Chittagong Abahani.

== International career ==
=== Youth ===
After admitting in BKSP in 2013, Jewel called up in Bangladesh U16 ahead of 2013 SAFF U-16 Championship. He didn't make any appearance in the tournament.

As he was eligible to play, he was also included in the Bangladesh squad for 2015 SAFF U-16 Championship. Bangladesh became champion in that edition. However, Jewel didn't make any appearance this time too.

He also called up in Bangladesh U19 team, but couldn't make into the final squad.

=== Senior ===
In March 2021, Jewel got his first call up in preliminary squad of Bangladesh national team as a u-23 standby player ahead of Three Nations cup. He impressed national team head coach Jamie Day with only one day of training. As a result, he was included in the final squad and traveled to Nepal. However, he didn't make debut in that tournament.

On 6 March 2021, Jewel made his international debut for Bangladesh against Afghanistan in 2022 FIFA World Cup qualification match. He came from the bench as a substitute on the 73rd minute.

== Statistics ==
=== International ===
As of 15 June 2021

Appearances and goals by national team, year and competition
Team	Year	Competitive		Friendly		Total	
Team	Year	Apps	Goals	Apps	Goals	Apps	Goals
Bangladesh U16	2013	—		—		—	
Bangladesh U16	2015	—		—		—	
Bangladesh U16	Total	—	—	—		—	
Bangladesh	2021	2 (Note: Appearance(s) in FIFA World Cup qualification)	0	—		2	0
Bangladesh	Total	2	0	—		2	0
Career total		2	0	—		2	0
