= Yusuke Kato =

Japanese footballer

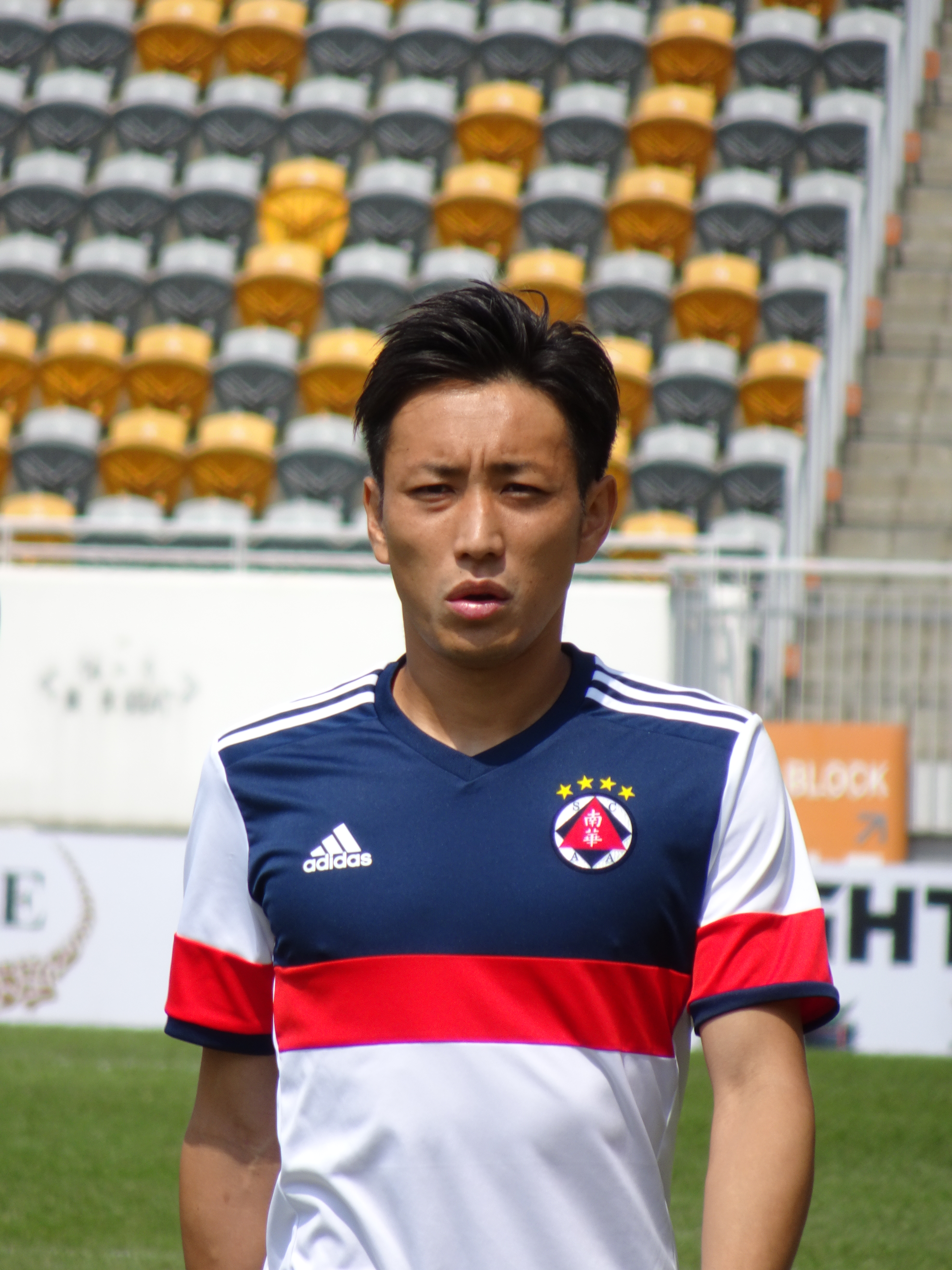

Personal information
- Full name: Yusuke Kato
- Date of birth: 13 February 1986 (age 40)
- Place of birth: Osaka, Japan
- Height: 1.73 m (5 ft 8 in)
- Positions: Midfielder; forward

Youth career
- 2005–2006: Huracán

Senior career*
Years	Team	Apps	(Gls)
2006–2010	Huracán	15	(1)
2008	→ Def. de Belgrano (loan)	13	(1)
2011	MIO Biwako Kusatsu	0	(0)
2012	Dempo	4	(1)
2012	BEC Tero Sasana	12	(2)
2013	Nakhon Ratchasima	31	(14)
2014	Samut Songkhram	24	(4)
2015	BBCU	30	(14)
2016	Udon Thani	9	(0)
2016	Angthong	5	(0)
2017	South China	8	(2)
2017	Gresik United	14	(0)
2018–2019	Muktijoddha Sangsad	21	(7)
2019–2020	Sheikh Jamal Dhanmondi	5	(0)
2020–2021	Muktijoddha Sangsad	23	(2)
Total		214	(48)

Managerial career
- 2021: Muktijoddha Sangsad KC (assistant manager)
- * Club domestic league appearances and goals

Yusuke Kato (加藤 友介, Katō Yūsuke; born 13 February 1986) is a Japanese former football midfielder who last played for Muktijoddha Sangsad KC in Bangladesh. Kato is the second Japanese player to play in Argentina's top division football league after Naohiro Takahara.

At the age of 14, he went to Argentina to learn football, and after graduating from high school, went to Argentina again to play football.

He is the first Japanese football player to play in the first division (Primera Division) after promoting from the U-20 in Argentina.

Antonio Mohamed, the manager of that time, said, “Kato is my son. He has a great scoring ability.”

The manager Osvaldo Ardiles said, “He can definitely play well in J League.”

The teammates who have played together so far are Javier Pastore, Dani Osvaldo, Joaquín Larrivey and Mario Bolatti.

When he played in Thailand, he played under Sven-Göran Eriksson and was said, “I assure that Kato’s ability to play in Thailand’s top team.”

== Career ==
=== Argentina ===
Kato made Japanese football history when he joined Argentine Primera División side Huracán. He stayed there from 2006 to 2010 making 15 league appearances and scoring once. Kato scored his first goal for Huracán against Talleres de Cordoba in 2007.

=== Dempo ===
On 30 January 2012 it was confirmed that Kato had signed a deal with Indian I-League team Dempo S.C. for the 2011–12 season. He scored his first goal in I-League for Dempo S.C. on 24 March 2012 against HAL SC, in which Dempo won 3–0.

=== Muktijoddha Sangsad KC ===
Kato had his first stint with Muktijoddha Sangsad KC during the 2018–19 Bangladesh Premier League season. After spending the 2019–20 season with Sheikh Jamal Dhanmondi he returned to the club, on 16 November 2020. Before the start of the 2021 Bangladesh Premier League season the clubs higher-ups decided against participating in the league due to financial problems. Kato helped the club tremendously by seeking help from the Japanese community and was able to get a donation of Tk30. The donations allowed the club to take part in the Bangladesh Premier League and they ended the season finishing in tenth place out of 13 teams which was safe from relegation.

On 18 November 2021, before the start of the 2021–22 Bangladesh Premier League season, Kato retired from professional football and became a member of Muktijoddha's coaching staff for a short while. He is thought to be a modern-day Muktijoddha Sangsad KC legend.

== Honours ==
Dempo SC

- I-League: 2011–12

South China

- Hong Kong FA Cup Runner-up: 2016–17
