= Arifur Rahman (footballer) =

Bangladeshi footballer

Personal information
- Full name: Arifur Rahman
- Date of birth: 15 February 1999 (age 27)
- Place of birth: Comilla, Bangladesh
- Height: 5 ft 6 in (1.68 m)
- Position: Left winger

Team information
- Current team: Arambagh KS
- Number: 17

Youth career
- 2015: BFF Sylhet Academy

Senior career*
Years	Team	Apps	(Gls)
2015–2016	Dilkusha SC		
2016–2017	Victoria SC	14	(6)
2017	Chittagong Abahani	0	(0)
2017–2019	Arambagh KS	19	(6)
2019–2021	Saif SC	14	(2)
2021–2022	Chittagong Abahani	13	(1)
2023–2024	Chittagong Abahani	0	(0)
2024–2025	Bangladesh Police	4	(0)
2025–	Arambagh KS	0	(0)

International career^{‡}
2017	Bangladesh U19	1	(0)
2019	Bangladesh U23	1	(0)
2019–2020	Bangladesh	3	(0)
- * Club domestic league appearances and goals as of 17 January 2025 ‡ National team caps and goals as of 1 August 2021

Arifur Rahman (Bengali: আরিফুর রহমান) is a Bangladeshi footballer who plays as a winger for Bangladesh Football League club Arambagh KS.

== Club career ==
=== Early career ===
Arif started his youth career by participating in the 2014 Pioneer League. He became top scorer in that edition with 18 goals for Kalyan Sangha. In the same year, he played in the BFF U-18 Football Tournament for Abahani Limited Dhaka.

In 2015, he trained in BFF Academy, in Sylhet for seven months.

=== Dilkusha SC ===
After graduating from BFF Academy, Arif started his senior professional career in 2015 when he joined Dilkusha Sporting Club, a Dhaka Third Division Football League club. He got man of the match award 8 times in 2015-16 Dhaka Third Division League, more than any other player from his team.

=== Victoria SC ===
In 2016, Arif joined Bangladesh Championship League side Victoria SC. He scored 6 goals in the league.

=== Chittagong Abahani ===
In 2017, Arif joined country's top division side Chittagong Abahani to participate in the 2017–18 Bangladesh Premier League. Nonetheless, he failed to make a league appearance for the club and eventually departed during the mid-season transfer window.

=== Arambagh KS ===
In 2017, Arif moved to Arambagh KS, another top division side, from Chittagong Abahani. He had a dream journey with Arambagh KS as his career got a breakthrough under former Bangladesh national team head coach Maruful Haque here. He came to the limelight when his team won 2017 Independence Cup beating his former club Chittagong Abahani. He was adjudged Man of the final and Player of the tournament. It was Arambagh's first major domestic trophy in its history. Arif performed consistently in the following season, scoring six goals in 2018-19 BPL. including a hattrick. He scored a goal in the league running at 35.8 km per hour, faster than any other player in Bangladesh. His performance soon earned him a callup to the Bangladesh national team. However, he left the club after spending two years as Arambagh was involved in a major casino scandal in 2019.

=== Saif SC ===
In 2019, Arif signed a one-year contract with Saif Sporting Club.

== International career ==
=== Youth ===
Arif played in 2013 SAFF U-16 Championship for Bangladesh U-16 national team.

=== Senior career ===
Arif made his senior debut against Laos during 2022 FIFA World Cup qualification match on 9 June 2019.

=== International goals ===
Unofficial

#	Date	Venue	Opponent	Score	Result	Competition
1.	1 June 2019	Leo Stadium, Bangkok	(Thailand) BG Pathum United	2–0	3–0	Unofficial Friendly

== Honours ==
Dilkusha SC

- Dhaka Third Division League: 2015

Arambagh KS

- Independence Cup: 2017–18
