= Khurshed Beknazarov =

Tajik footballer

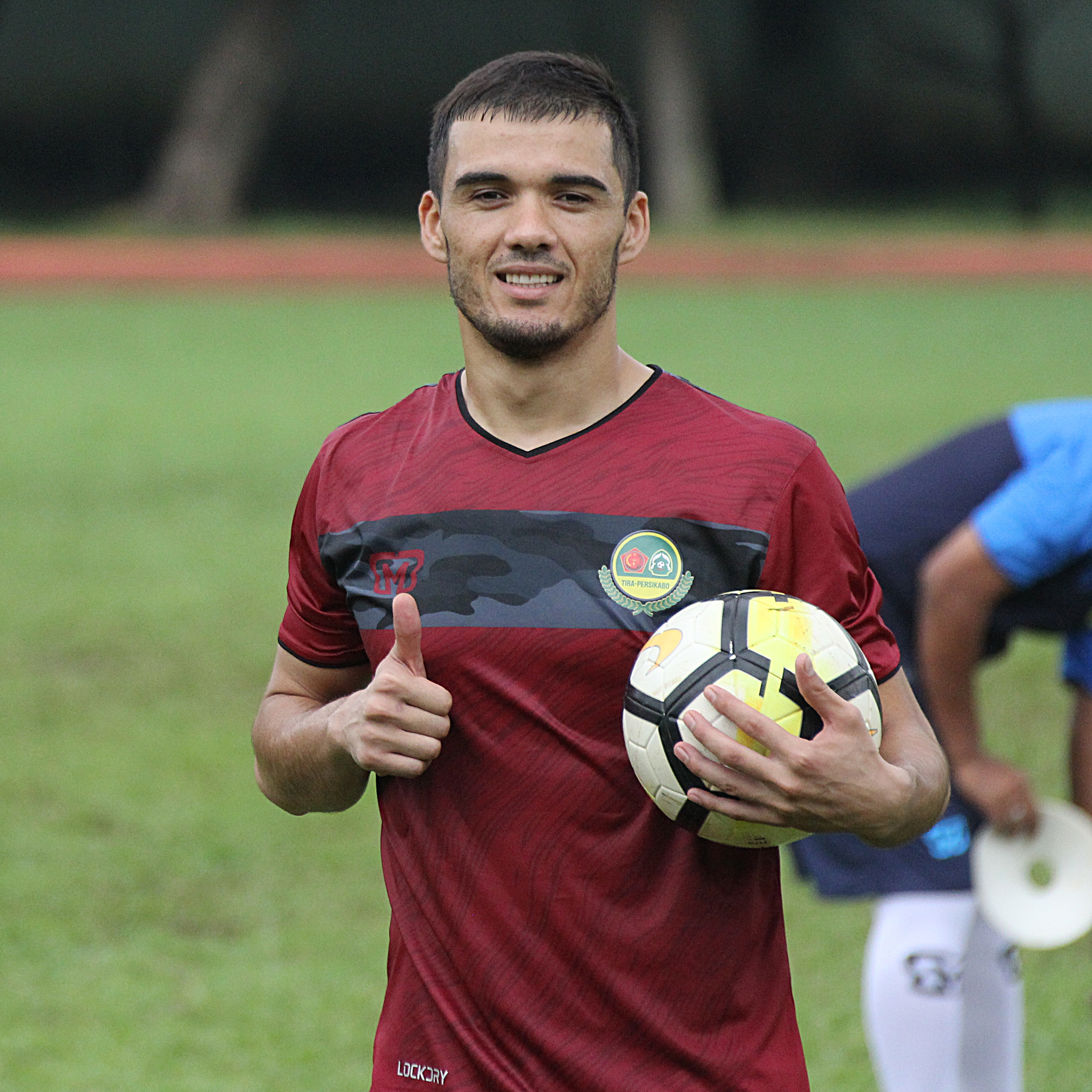
- Khurshed with TIRA-Persikabo in 2019

Personal information
- Full name: Khurshed Beknazarov
- Date of birth: 26 June 1994 (age 32)
- Place of birth: Dushanbe, Tajikistan
- Height: 1.85 m (6 ft 1 in)
- Position: Defender

Team information
- Current team: Parvoz

Senior career*
Years	Team	Apps	(Gls)
2015	Vahsh Qurghonteppa		
2016–2018	Khujand		
2019	TIRA-Persikabo	31	(4)
2020	Khujand		
2021–2022	Rahmatganj MFS	16	(1)
2022–2024	Istaravshan		
2025	Khosilot		
2025–	Parvoz		

International career^{‡}
2018–2020	Tajikistan	13	(0)
- * Club domestic league appearances and goals as of 29 June 2025 ‡ National team caps and goals as of 3 September 2025

Khurshed Beknazarov (Tajik: Хуршед Бекназаров; born 26 June 1994) is a Tajikistani professional football player who currently plays as a defender for Tajik club Parvoz. Internationally, he represented the Tajikistan national team.

== Career ==
=== Club ===
On 16 February 2020, FK Khujand announced the return of Beknazarov.

=== International ===
Beknazarov made his senior team debut on 2 October 2018 against Nepal.

== Career statistics ==
=== International ===
As of match played 3 September 2020

Appearances and goals by national team and year
National team	Year	Apps	Goals
Tajikistan	2018	7	0
Tajikistan	2019	5	0
Tajikistan	2020	1	0
Total		13	0
