= Russel Mahmud Liton =

Bangladeshi footballer (born 1994)

Russel Mahmud
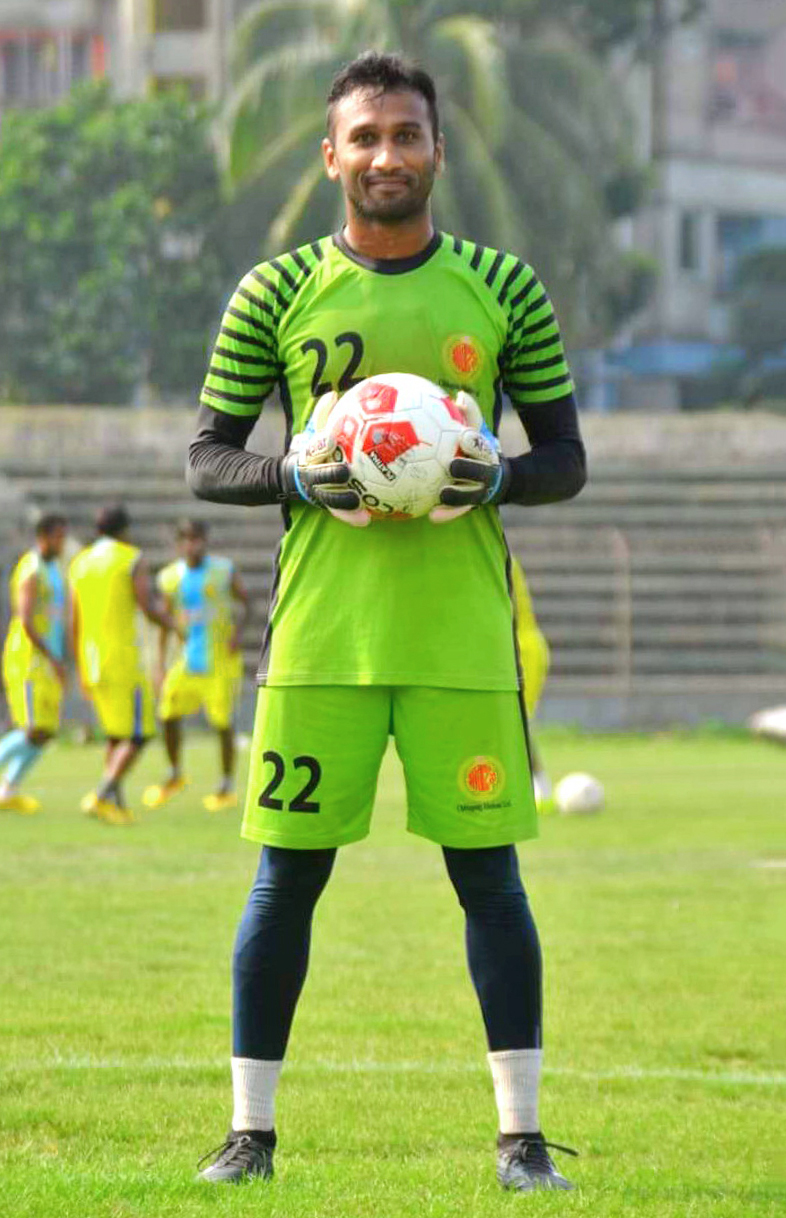
- Russel with Chittagong Abahani in 2019

Personal information
- Full name: Russel Mahmud Liton
- Date of birth: 30 November 1994 (age 31)
- Place of birth: Rangamati, Bangladesh
- Height: 1.75 m (5 ft 9 in)
- Position: Goalkeeper

Senior career*
Years	Team	Apps	(Gls)
2011–2012	Brothers Union		(0)
2012–2014	Muktijoddha		(0)
2014–2016	Sheikh Russel		(0)
2017–2018	Mohammedan	8	(0)
2018–2019	Chittagong Abahani	2	(0)
2019–2021	Rahmatganj	27	(0)
2021–2022	Sheikh Russel	1	(0)
2022–2023	Sheikh Jamal	5	(0)
2023–2025	Bangladesh Police	1	(0)
2025–2026	Brothers Union	0	(0)

International career
2011–2012	Bangladesh U19		(0)
2014–2015	Bangladesh U23	9	(0)
2014–2015	Bangladesh	6	(0)
- * Club domestic league appearances and goals

Md Rasel Mahmud (মোঃরাসেল মাহমুদ; born 30 November 1994) is a retired Bangladeshi professional footballer who played as a goalkeeper. He last played for Bangladesh Football League club Brothers Union and represented the Bangladesh national team from 2014 to 2015.

== International career ==
=== Youth ===
In 2011, Rasel debuted for Bangladesh U19. He represented Bangladesh in 2012 AFC U-19 Championship qualification. He played all the five matches and kept cleansheet against Maldives U19.

On 25 August 2014, Liton made his debut for Bangladesh U-23 against Nepal U-23 in an International Friendly On 27 July 2014 he was selected by Lodewijk de Kruif for the 2014 Asian Games, held in Incheon, South Korea.

=== Senior ===
After the Asian Games, Rasel was called up by de Kruif for two friendly matches against Sri Lanka in October 2014, at Jessore and Rajshahi, Bangladesh. He made his debut in the first match, on 24 October. He kept his first clean sheet in second match, on 27 October.

== Career statistics ==
=== International ===
As of March 2015

Bangladesh U-23
Appearance	Clean sheets	Penalty Saves
16	3	0

As of 16 June 2015

Bangladesh National Team
Appearance	Clean sheets	Penalty Saves
6	1	0
