= Lorougnon Christ Remi =

Ivorian footballer

Lorougnon Remi
Personal information
- Full name: Lorougnon Christ Remi
- Date of birth: 15 February 1988 (age 38)
- Place of birth: Ivory Coast
- Position: Forward

Team information
- Current team: Rahmatganj MFS

Senior career*
Years	Team	Apps	(Gls)
2013–2015	Shabab Sahel	40	(17)
2016–2017	Ansar	10	(4)
2017	Al-Baqa'a Club		
2017–2019	Tadamon Sour	20	(10)
2019	Churchill Brothers	3	(1)
2019–2020	Shabab Bourj	0	(0)
2020–21	Rahmatganj MFS	15	(7)
- * Club domestic league appearances and goals as of 29 June 2021

Lorougnon Christ Remi (born 15 February 1988), or simply Christ Remi, is an Ivorian professional footballer who plays as a forward for Bangladeshi club Rahmatganj MFS.
