= Arambagh KS =

Association football club based in Dhaka

Arambagh Krira Sangha
- Full name: Arambagh Krira Sangha Dhaka
- Nickname: The Rising Strength
- Founded: 1958; 68 years ago
- Ground: Shaheed Miraj–Tapan Stadium
- Capacity: 5,000
- Chairman: Md Yaqub Ali
- Head coach: SM Zakaria
- League: Bangladesh Football League
- 2025–26: Bangladesh Football League, 9th of 10 (relegated)
Home colours	Away colours

Arambagh Krira Sangha (Bengali: আরামবাগ ক্রীড়া সংঘ, Bengali pronunciation: [aɾambaɡ kriɽa ʃɔŋɡʱo]) is a Bangladeshi professional football club based in Dhaka.

== History ==
Arambagh Krira Sangha were formed in Dhaka in 1958. Originally established as a football club, Arambagh later added handball, basketball and volleyball to their roster.

They became the first football club from Bangladesh who played in the final in an international club tournament during 1981 ANFA Cup, hosted by Nepal. They also finished runners-up twice in the Sikkim Gold Cup. In 1997, the club took part in a football tournament at Agartala that marked the golden jubilee of the independence of India. They used to be a top-five finisher prior to 1990, but failed to continue their form later and during 2012–13 season, the club experienced one of its lowest points when it was relegated from the Bangladesh Premier League. Since their return to the top flight again in 2016, their performance graph only shows upward movement.

Moreover, after being appointed as the club president in 2015, Mominul Haque Shaeed made a link-up with Dilkusha and Arambagh Football Academy to collect footballers from grassroots for his club, and those players are now delivering results.

As far as domestic football is concerned, Arambagh emerged as the runners-up three times in the prestigious season-opening Federation Cup, in 1997, 2001 and 2016. International or domestic football, Arambagh's crowning moment came in the 2017–18 Independence Cup where they defeated established powerhouses on their way to the title.

=== Saiful Bari Titu era ===
Arambagh KS appointed Saiful Bari Titu as head coach on 19 March 2016.

Arambagh finished at sixth position in 2016 Bangladesh Football Premier League which is their best performance after 2009–10 Bangladesh League. They also played the final of Bangladesh Federation Cup after 15 long years where they lost the game to Dhaka Abahani by Lee Tuck's solitary goal.

=== Maruful Haque era ===
On 8 April 2017, Arambagh KS appointed former Bangladesh national team head coach Maruful Haque as their new head coach.
A few days later Arambagh also became the first club ever to introduce GPS system in Bangladesh football.

On 10 February 2018, Arambagh KS celebrated their first ever domestic silverware in the club's history of about 60 years by defeating defending champion Chittagong Abahani in the final of 2017–18 Independence Cup by 2–0 margin at Bangabandhu National Stadium in Dhaka.
The champions received taka 500,000 and the runners-up received taka 300,000 as prize money. Besides, Arambagh club management also announced taka 10,00,000 for the entire team. Arambagh winger Mohammad Arifur Rahman was named the man of the final and also the man of the tournament. Arambagh striker Mohammad Jewel was adjudged the top scorer netting three goals.

=== Subrata Bhattacharya Jr. ===
On 23 December 2020, Arambagh boys gifted their new Indian head coach Subrata Bhattacharya a winning debut as they beat Brothers Union by 2–0.

On 16 August 2021 defeat against Uttar Baridhara SC at Dhaka the club have confirmed relegation from Bangladesh Premier League to Bangladesh Championship League. Its the club 2nd relegation after 2015–16 season.

=== Suspension and relegation ===
On 29 August 2021 Bangladesh Football Federation disciplinary committee had confirmed the clubs involvement with spot fixing, match manipulations and live and online betting. The clubs management committee along with local and foreign players, were all reported to be involved. BFF disciplinary committee decided to fine 5 lakhs BDT & ban the club for two years from entering the Bangladesh Championship League. The club would have to enter domestic football again through the third-tier, the Dhaka Senior Division Football League.

== Current squad ==
As of 3 September 2025

Note: Flags indicate national team as defined under FIFA eligibility rules; some limited exceptions apply. Players may hold more than one non-FIFA nationality.

No.	Pos.	Nation	Player
1	GK	BAN	Azad Hossen
2	DF	BAN	Md Rokey
4	DF	GHA	Suleman Mohammad
5	DF	BAN	Mahamudul Hasan Kiron
7	MF	BAN	Shain Rakib Khan Evan
9	FW	GHA	Samuel Amaniapoṅg Osei
10	FW	BAN	Samin Yasar Juel
11	FW	BAN	Md Irfan Hossen
12	FW	BAN	Md Mahmudul Hasan
13	DF	BAN	Md Jahidur Rahman Joblu
14	MF	BAN	Samor Joy Tanchangya
15	MF	BAN	Shree Joy Kumar
16	MF	GHA	Rayies Suraj
17	FW	BAN	Md Shafikul Islam
18	MF	BAN	Md Sohanur Rahman
18	FW	BAN	Sabbir Ahammed Opurbo
19	MF	BAN	Mohammad Mubarak Hossain
20	FW	BAN	Md Meraj Pradhan

No.	Pos.	Nation	Player
21	DF	BAN	Sakhawat Hossain
22	GK	BAN	Tayeb Siddique
23	DF	BAN	Gaushul Akbor Sabin
25	GK	BAN	Abdullah Al Mahbub
26	FW	BAN	Mohammad Shawon
27	DF	BAN	Mominur Fokir
27	FW	BAN	Faisal Ahmed
28	MF	BAN	Md Akash Ahmed
29	DF	BAN	Md Rezwan Mia
30	FW	NGR	Akanbi Musa
31	MF	BAN	Sojib Tanchagya
32	GK	BAN	Sheikh Shuvo Ahmed
33	DF	BAN	Apurbo Mali
34	DF	BAN	Mosthiur Rahman
36	MF	BAN	Saad Bin Alam
40	FW	BAN	Abdullah Junaid Cishty
55	DF	BAN	Apu Ahmed

== Personnel ==
=== Current coaching staff ===
As of 20 November 2026

Position	Name
Head Coach	(Bangladesh) SM Zakaria

== Team records ==
=== Head coach's record ===
As of 23 May 2026

Head Coach	Nat.	From	To	P	W	D	L	GS	GA	%W
Saiful Bari Titu	(Bangladesh)	19 March 2016	3 January 2017	33	8	17	8	30	32	24.24
Maruful Haque	(Bangladesh)	8 April 2017	18 July 2019	59	22	11	26	82	83	37.29
Sheikh Zahidur Rahman Milon	(Bangladesh)	29 October 2019	September 2020	7	1	2	4	8	17	14.29
Subrata Bhattacharya Jr.	(India)	23 December 2020	25 August 2022	26	2	2	22	24	67	7.69
Ekramul Rahman	(Bangladesh)	1 May 2024	30 August 2024	7	4	3	0	13	3	57.14
Md Akbar Hossain Ridon	(Bangladesh)	1 January 2025	1 May 2025	18	10	6	2	20	13	55.56
Sheikh Zahidur Rahman Milon	(Bangladesh)	1 May 2025	24 May 2026	22	3	5	14	12	42	13.64
SM Zakaria	(Bangladesh)	18 September 2026	Present	0	0	0	0	0	0	—

P – Total of played matches W – Won matches D – Drawn matches L – Lost matches GS – Goal scored GA – Goals against
%W – Percentage of matches won

== Honours ==
=== League ===
- Bangladesh Championship League
  - Runners-up (2): 2014–15, 2024–25
- Dhaka Second Division League
  - Champions (1): 1979
- Dhaka Third Division League
  - Champions (1): 1970

=== Cup ===
- Independence Cup
  - Champions (1): 2017–18
- Federation Cup
  - Runners-up (2): 1997, 2001

=== Invitational ===
- Sikkim Governor's Gold Cup
  - Runners-up (2): 2001, 2002
- ANFA Cup
  - Runners-up (1): 1981
