= Mohamed Sylla (footballer, born 2001) =

Ivorian footballer (born 2001)

Personal information
- Full name: Mohamed Sidiki Sylla
- Date of birth: 12 November 2001 (age 25)
- Place of birth: Akroufla, Ivory Coast
- Height: 1.69 m (5 ft 6 1/2 in)
- Position: Forward

Team information
- Current team: ES Ben Aknoun
- Number: 24

Senior career*
Years	Team	Apps	(Gls)
2017–2018	AS Tanda		
2018–2021	SC Gagnoa		
2021–2022	Radnički Sr. Mitrovica	9	(0)
2022–2024	RC Abidjan		
2024–2025	MC Oran	15	(0)
2025–	ES Ben Aknoun	19	(3)

International career^{‡}
2018	Ivory Coast U19	6	(0)
2023	Ivory Coast A'	3	(0)
- * Club domestic league appearances and goals as of 6 June 2025 ‡ National team caps and goals as of 15 February 2024

Mohamed Sidiki Sylla famously known Mohamed Sylla (born 12 November 2001) is an Ivorian professional footballer who plays as an attacker for Algerian Ligue Professionnelle 1 side ES Ben Aknoun and the Ivory Coast A' national team.

== Club career ==
Born in Akroufla, Ivory Coast, he played for Ivorian clubs AS Tanda, SC Gagnoa, and RC Abidjan before moving to FK Radnički Sremska Mitrovica in the Serbian First League in 2021.

== International career ==
Mohamed Sylla participated to the 2022 African Nations Championship held in Algeria with the national local team (A'). He debuted for the Ivory Coast first team in 2023.
