= 2014–15 Bangladesh Premier League (football) =

8th professional season of the top-flight football league in Bangladesh

Bangladesh Premier League
- Season: 2014–15
- Dates: 7 April - 22 August 2015
- Champions: Sheikh Jamal Dhanmondi Club
- Relegated: Farashganj SC
- AFC Cup: Sheikh Russel KC
- Matches: 110
- Goals: 332 (3.02 per match)
- Top goalscorer: 19 goals (Nigeria) Emeka Darlington (Shiekh Jamal DC)
- Biggest home win: Dhaka Mohammedan 5–0 Chittagong Abahani (09 April 2015)
- Biggest away win: Farashganj SC 1–9 Sheikh Jamal DC (28 June 2015)
- Highest scoring: Farashganj SC 1–9 Sheikh Jamal DC (28 June 2015)
- Longest winning run: 08 matches Sheikh Jamal DC
- Longest unbeaten run: 10 matches Sheikh Jamal DC
- Longest winless run: 20 matches Farashganj SC
- Longest losing run: 06 matches Team BJMC

The 2014–15 Bangladesh Premier League is also known as Manyavar Bangladesh Premier League due to the sponsorship from Manyavar. It was the 8th season of the Bangladesh Premier League since its establishment in 2007. A total of 11 teams compete in the league.

Sheikh Jamal Dhanmondi Club are the defending champions, having won their Bangladesh Premier League title the previous season. Farashganj SC and Rahmatganj MFS entered as the two promoted teams.

== Teams ==
=== Stadiums and locations ===
The league matches were held on a home and away basis at the following stadiums but the first round matches were held exclusively at the Bangabandhu National Stadium in Dhaka.

Locations of teams in the 2014-15 Manyavar Bangladesh Premier League

Club	Stadium	Location	Capacity
Brothers Union	Bangabandhu National Stadium	Dhaka	36,000
Chittagong Abahani	MA Aziz Stadium	Chittagong	40,000
Dhaka Abahani	Bangabandhu National Stadium	Dhaka	36,000
Dhaka Mohammedan	Bangabandhu National Stadium	Dhaka	36,000
Farashganj SC	Bangabandhu National Stadium	Dhaka	36,000
Feni Soccer Club	Shaheed Salam Stadium	Feni	5,000
Muktijoddha Sangsad KC	Sheikh Fazlul Haque Mani Stadium	Gopalganj	5,000
Rahmatganj MFS	Bangabandhu National Stadium	Dhaka	36,000
Sheikh Jamal Dhanmondi Club	Bangabandhu National Stadium	Dhaka	36,000
Sheikh Russel KC	Bangabandhu National Stadium	Dhaka	36,000
Team BJMC	Bangabandhu National Stadium	Dhaka	36,000

=== Personnel and sponsoring ===
Team	Head coach	Captain	Shirt sponsor
Brothers Union	(India) Syed Nayeemuddin		Biswas Builders Group
Chittagong Abahani	(Bangladesh) Asaduzzaman Jhontu	(Bangladesh) Abdul Hannan Raju	
Dhaka Abahani	(Austria) György Kottán	(Bangladesh) Pranotosh Kumar Das	
Dhaka Mohammedan	(Bangladesh) Kazi Jasimuddin Ahmed Joshi	(Bangladesh) Arup Kumar Baidya	
Farashganj SC	(Bangladesh) Rezaul Haque Jamal	(Bangladesh) Sujan Chowdhury	
Feni Soccer Club	(Nigeria) Oladipupo Babalola	(Bangladesh) Akbor Hossain Ridon	
Muktijoddha Sangsad KC	(Bangladesh) Mohammad Abu Yusuf	(Bangladesh) Enamul Haque	
Rahmatganj MFS	(Bangladesh) Kamal Ahmed Babu	(Bangladesh) Mohammad Jahangir	Tiger Cement
Sheikh Jamal Dhanmondi Club	(Bangladesh) Maruful Haque	(Bangladesh) Nasiruddin Chowdhury	Bashundhara Group
Sheikh Russel KC	(Montenegro) Dragan Đukanović	(Bangladesh) Mithun Chowdhury	Bashundhara Group
Team BJMC	(Sri Lanka) Pakir Ali	(Nigeria) Samson Iliasu	

== Foreign players ==
Club	Leg	Player 1	Player 2	Player 3	Player 4	Player 5
Sheikh Jamal Dhanmondi Club	First	(The Gambia) Landing Darboe	(Haiti) Wedson Anselme	(Haiti) Leonel Saint-Preux	(Nigeria) Emeka Darlington	
Sheikh Jamal Dhanmondi Club	Second					
Sheikh Russel KC	First	(Bosnia and Herzegovina) Bojan Petric	(Cameroon) Paul Emile Biyaga	(Jamaica) Akeem Priestley	(Nigeria) Nkwocha Kingsley Chigozie	
Sheikh Russel KC	Second	(Cameroon) Jean J Ikanga		(Bosnia and Herzegovina) Damir Ibrić		
Dhaka Abahani	First	(Ghana) Samad Yussif	(Hungary) Szabolcs Csorba	(Hungary) Gábor Demjén	(Nigeria) Tayo Ifabiyi	(Nigeria) Ubom Henry Felix
Dhaka Abahani	Second		(Nigeria) Sunday Chizoba	(Ghana) Osei Morrison		
Dhaka Mohammedan	First	(Guinea) Ismael Bangoura	(Guinea) Mohamed Camara	(Guinea) Mansa Sylla	(Nigeria) Eleta Benjamin Jr.	
Dhaka Mohammedan	Second			(Cameroon) Belinga Amabara		
Muktijoddha Sangsad KC	First	(Egypt) Fekry Zeiada	(Ghana) Abass Inussah	(Ivory Coast) Diakite Lamine	(Senegal) Camara Sarba	
Muktijoddha Sangsad KC	Second					
Brothers Union	First	(Haiti) Walson Augustin	(Nigeria) Adams Jankasa	(Cameroon) Germain Kenfack	(Uganda) James Odoch	(Nigeria) Kester Akon
Brothers Union	Second					
Team BJMC	First	(Nigeria) Samson Iliasu	(Senegal) Doudou Sonko	(Nigeria) Eleta Kingsley		
Team BJMC	Second					
Rahmatganj MFS	First	(Guinea) Conte Bangoura	(Nigeria) Moses Amadi	(Nigeria) Zedwin	(Nigeria) Gideon Solomon	
Rahmatganj MFS	Second					
Farashganj SC	First	(Ghana) Issah Youssuf	(Nigeria) Akinyele Peter	(Nigeria) Uche Felix	(Nigeria) Henry Jacob	
Farashganj SC	Second					
Feni Soccer Club	First	(The Gambia) Momodou Lamin Jatta	(The Gambia) Alh Kebba Ceesay	(The Gambia) Dawda Ceesay	(Uganda) Harisheh Asuman	
Feni Soccer Club	Second					
Chittagong Abahani	First	(Nepal) Lok Bandhu Gurung	(Cameroon) Yoko Samnick			
Chittagong Abahani	Second					

== Matches ==
=== Round 1 ===
Match 1

7 April 2015
5 PM BDST

Sheikh Jamal Dhanmondi Club	4-1	Farashganj SC
Wedson Anselme 15'; Landing Darboe 47', 90+2'; Mamunul Islam 75'		Akinyele Peter 10' (pen.)

Bangabandhu National Stadium, Dhaka

Match 2

8 April 2015
4:15 PM BDST

Dhaka Abahani	2-2	Rahmatganj MFS
Szabolcs Csorba 56'; Gábor Demjén 72'		Gideon Solomon 58'; Mannaf Rabby 90+1'

Bangabandhu National Stadium, Dhaka
Referee: Azad Rahman (Bangladesh)

Match 3

8 April 2015
6:30 PM BDST

Muktijoddha Sangsad KC	2-1	Feni Soccer Club
Enamul Haque 12'; Monjurur Rahman Manik 45+1' (o.g.)		Mohammad Biplob 50' (o.g.)

Bangabandhu National Stadium, Dhaka

Match 4

9 April 2015
4:15 PM BDST

Dhaka Mohammedan	5-0	Chittagong Abahani
Ismael Bangoura 59', 86'; Tawhidul Alam Sabuz 66'; Masuk Mia Jony 69'; Arup Kumar Baidya 90+3'

Bangabandhu National Stadium, Dhaka
Referee: Mizanur Rahman (Bangladesh)

Match 5

9 April 2015
6:30 PM BDST

Brothers Union	0-0	Team BJMC

Bangabandhu National Stadium, Dhaka

=== Round 2 ===
Match 6

11 April 2015
4 PM BDST

Sheikh Jamal Dhanmondi Club	2-1	Rahmatganj MFS
Kesto Kumar Bose 31'; Emeka Darlington 56' (pen.)		Mannaf Rabby 78'

Bangabandhu National Stadium, Dhaka
Referee: Jasim Uddin (Bangladesh)

Match 7

12 April 2015
4:15 PM BDST

Muktijoddha Sangsad KC	2-1	Chittagong Abahani
Enamul Haque 54', 85'		Sumon Ali 45+1'

Bangabandhu National Stadium, Dhaka

Match 8

12 April 2015
6:30 PM BDST

Dhaka Abahani	4-0	Feni Soccer Club
Gabor Demjen 22'; Szabolcs Csorba 45+1', 77'; Mamun Mia 90+1'

Bangabandhu National Stadium, Dhaka

Match 9

13 April 2015
4:15 PM BDST

Sheikh Russel KC	2-1	Brothers Union
Jahid Hasan Ameli 80'; Paul Emile Biyaga 82'		Kawsar Ali Rabbi 16'

Bangabandhu National Stadium, Dhaka

Match 10

13 April 2015
6:30 PM BDST

Dhaka Mohammedan	2-0	Team BJMC
Tawhidul Alam Sabuz 5'; Jewel Rana 70'

Bangabandhu National Stadium, Dhaka

=== Round 3 ===
Match 11

15 April 2015
5 PM BDST

Sheikh Jamal Dhanmondi Club	2-0	Feni Soccer Club
Wedson Anselme 24'; Emeka Darlington 28'

Bangabandhu National Stadium, Dhaka

Match 12

16 April 2015
4:15 PM BDST

Dhaka Abahani	2-0	Chittagong Abahani
Szabolcs Csorba 73'; Gabor Demjen 78'(pen.)

Bangabandhu National Stadium, Dhaka

Match 13

16 April 2015
6:30 PM BDST

Team BJMC	1-3	Muktijoddha Sangsad KC
Jibon 90+2'		Fekry Zeiada 23'; Abass Inussah 56'; Camara Sarba 72'

Bangabandhu National Stadium, Dhaka

Match 14

17 April 2015
4:15 PM BDST

Brothers Union	3-1	Farashganj SC
Adams Jankasa 50', 85'; Walson Augustin 55'		Akinyele Peter 79'

Bangabandhu National Stadium, Dhaka

Match 15

17 April 2015
6:30 PM BDST

Sheikh Russel KC	1-0	Dhaka Mohammedan
Rezaul Karim 60'

Bangabandhu National Stadium, Dhaka

=== Round 4 ===
Match 16

19 April 2015
5 PM BDST

Sheikh Jamal Dhanmondi Club	4-0	Chittagong Abahani
Wedson Anselme 51', 74'; Emeka Darlington 76', 78'

Bangabandhu National Stadium, Dhaka

Match 17

19 April 2015
4:15 PM BDST

Sheikh Russel KC	1-2	Muktijoddha Sangsad KC
Paul Emile Biyaga 31'		Enamul Haque 21'; Camara Sarba 63'

Bangabandhu National Stadium, Dhaka

Match 18

19 April 2015
6:30 PM BDST

Dhaka Abahani	2-0	Team BJMC
Shahedul Alam Shahed 32'; Abdul Baten Mojumdar Komol 36'

Bangabandhu National Stadium, Dhaka

Match 19

20 April 2015
4:15 PM BDST

Rahmatganj MFS	2-0	Farashganj SC
Gideon Solomon 14'; Nurul Absar 33'

Bangabandhu National Stadium, Dhaka

Match 20

20 April 2015
6:30 PM BDST

Dhaka Mohammedan	0-1	Brothers Union
		Walson Augustin 86'

Bangabandhu National Stadium, Dhaka

=== Round 5 ===
Match 21

23 April 2015
4:45 PM BDST

Sheikh Jamal Dhanmondi Club	2-1	Team BJMC
Wedson Anselme 33'; Emeka Darlington 73'		Samson 23'

Bangabandhu National Stadium, Dhaka

Match 22

24 April 2015
4:15 PM BDST

Brothers Union	5-2	Muktijoddha Sangsad KC
Walson Augustin (19(pen.)), 44' (87(pen.)), 90+7'; Shariful 58'		Camara Sarba 58'; Enamul Haque 57' (pen.)

Bangabandhu National Stadium, Dhaka

Match 23

24 April 2015
6:30 PM BDST

Sheikh Russel KC	2-0	Dhaka Abahani
Zahid Hossain 84'; Jahid Hasan Ameli 90+2'

Bangabandhu National Stadium, Dhaka

Match 24

25 April 2015
4:15 PM BDST

Rahmatganj MFS	0-1	Feni Soccer Club
		Saran Hawlader 40'

Bangabandhu National Stadium, Dhaka

Match 25

25 April 2015
6:30 PM BDST

Dhaka Mohammedan	2-1	Farashganj SC
Tawhidul Alam Sabuz 40'; Ismael Bangoura 52'		Akinyele Peter 51'

Bangabandhu National Stadium, Dhaka

=== Round 6 ===
Match 26

27 April 2015
4:15 PM BDST

Sheikh Jamal Dhanmondi Club	1-0	Sheikh Russel KC
Landing Darboe 56'

Bangabandhu National Stadium, Dhaka

Match 27

27 April 2015
6:30 PM BDST

Dhaka Abahani	1-0	Brothers Union
Gabor Demjen 21'

Bangabandhu National Stadium, Dhaka

Match 28

29 April 2015
4:15 PM BDST

Dhaka Mohammedan	3-2	Muktijoddha Sangsad KC
Ismael Bangoura (55(pen.)); Mohammad Ibrahim 80'		Mohammad Biplob 40'; Enamul Haque 42'

Bangabandhu National Stadium, Dhaka

Match 29

29 April 2015
6:30 PM BDST

Rahmatganj MFS	0-1	Chittagong Abahani
		Sumon Ali 17'

Bangabandhu National Stadium, Dhaka

Match 30

30 April 2015
5 PM BDST

Farashganj SC	0-0	Feni Soccer Club

Bangabandhu National Stadium, Dhaka

=== Round 7 ===
Match 31

2 May 2015
4:15 PM BDST

Sheikh Jamal Dhanmondi Club	0-0	Brothers Union

Bangabandhu National Stadium, Dhaka

Match 32

2 May 2015
6:30 PM BDST

Rahmatganj MFS	1-1	Muktijoddha Sangsad KC
Mannaf Rabby 90+1'		Enamul Haque 69'

Bangabandhu National Stadium, Dhaka

Match 33

3 May 2015
4:15 PM BDST

Dhaka Mohammedan	1-1	Feni Soccer Club
Mohammad Ibrahim 5'		Momodou Lamin Jatta 22'

Bangabandhu National Stadium, Dhaka

Match 34

3 May 2015
6:30 PM BDST

Sheikh Russel KC	2-1	Team BJMC
Paul Emile Biyaga 20'; Jahid Hasan Ameli 53' (pen.)		Jibon 22'(pen.)

Bangabandhu National Stadium, Dhaka

Match 35

4 May 2015
5 PM BDST

Farashganj SC	2-2	Chittagong Abahani
Uche 13'; Rasel 24'		Hemu 2'; Hanif 70'

Bangabandhu National Stadium, Dhaka

=== Round 8 ===
Match 36

5 May 2015
4:45 PM BDST

Dhaka Abahani	0-1	Muktijoddha Sangsad KC
		Camara Sarba 12'

Bangabandhu National Stadium, Dhaka

Match 37

6 May 2015
4:15 PM BDST

Dhaka Mohammedan	1-1	Sheikh Jamal Dhanmondi Club
Jewel Rana 52'		Leonel Saint-Preux 58'

Bangabandhu National Stadium, Dhaka

Match 38

6 May 2015
6:15 PM BDST

Rahmatganj MFS	1-0	Team BJMC
Mohammad Arafat 45+2'

Bangabandhu National Stadium, Dhaka

Match 39

7 May 2015
4:15 PM BDST

Farashganj SC	2-2	Sheikh Russel KC
Akinyele Peter 35', 72'		Jahid Hasan Ameli 12'; Paul Emile Biyaga 27'

Bangabandhu National Stadium, Dhaka

Match 40

7 May 2015
6:15 PM BDST

Feni Soccer Club	2-1	Chittagong Abahani
Sohel Mia 59'; Zahirul 80'		Hanif 45'

Bangabandhu National Stadium, Dhaka

=== Round 9 ===
Match 41

10 May 2015
6 PM BDST

Sheikh Jamal Dhanmondi Club	2-1	Muktijoddha Sangsad KC
Emeka Darlington 2'; Wedson Anselme 23'		Mazharul Islam Himel 5' (o.g.)

Bangabandhu National Stadium, Dhaka

Match 42

11 May 2015
4:15 PM BDST

Dhaka Abahani	0-0	Farashganj SC

Bangabandhu National Stadium, Dhaka

Match 43

11 May 2015
6:30 PM BDST

Sheikh Russel KC	2-1	Feni Soccer Club
Hemanta Vincent Biswas 14'; Kingsley Chigozie 60'		Momodou Lamin Jatta 19' (pen.)

Bangabandhu National Stadium, Dhaka

Match 44

12 May 2015
4:15 PM BDST

Team BJMC	1-1	Chittagong Abahani
Tara 57'		Abdul Hannan Raju 23'

Bangabandhu National Stadium, Dhaka

Match 45

12 May 2015
6:30 PM BDST

Brothers Union	1-0	Rahmatganj MFS
Walson Augustin 75'

Bangabandhu National Stadium, Dhaka

=== Round 10 ===
Match 46

14 May 2015
4:45 PM BDST

Dhaka Abahani	2-0	Sheikh Jamal Dhanmondi Club
Wahed Ahmed 20', 58'

Bangabandhu National Stadium, Dhaka

Match 47

16 May 2015
4:15 PM BDST

Dhaka Mohammedan	5-0	Rahmatganj MFS
Ismael Bangoura 23', 26', 87'; Jewel Rana 30'; Tawhidul Alam Sabuz 76'

Bangabandhu National Stadium, Dhaka

Match 48

16 May 2015
6:30 PM BDST

Brothers Union	2-1	Feni Soccer Club
Kester 62'; Walson Augustin 90+2'		Biddut 31'

Bangabandhu National Stadium, Dhaka

Match 49

17 May 2015
4:15 PM BDST

Sheikh Russel KC	2-0	Chittagong Abahani
Mithun Chowdhury Mithun 21'; Bojan Petric 39'

Bangabandhu National Stadium, Dhaka

Match 50

17 May 2015
6:30 PM BDST

Farashganj SC	0-4	Team BJMC
		Tapu 20'; Shonko 51', 90+2'; Jiku 57'

Bangabandhu National Stadium, Dhaka

=== Round 11 ===
Match 51

20 May 2015
4:45 PM BDST

Dhaka Abahani	0-1	Dhaka Mohammedan
		Mohammad Ibrahim 90'

Bangabandhu National Stadium, Dhaka

Match 52

20 May 2015
7 PM BDST

Sheikh Russel KC	1-1	Rahmatganj MFS
Jahid Hasan Ameli 90+1' (pen.)		Mannaf Rabby 90+5'

Bangabandhu National Stadium, Dhaka

== Standings ==
=== League table ===
Pos	Team	Pld	W	D	L	GF	GA	GD	Pts	Qualification or relegation
1	Sheikh Jamal Dhanmondi Club (C)	20	16	3	1	60	22	+38	51	
2	Sheikh Russel KC (Q)	20	13	3	4	41	25	+16	42	2017 AFC Cup qualifying round
3	Dhaka Mohammedan	20	11	5	4	38	17	+21	38	
4	Dhaka Abahani	20	10	5	5	32	13	+19	35	
5	Brothers Union	20	10	5	5	29	21	+8	35	
6	Muktijoddha Sangsad KC	20	8	4	8	31	31	0	28	
7	Team BJMC	20	6	4	10	26	28	−2	22	
8	Feni Soccer Club	20	5	3	12	26	42	−16	18	
9	Chittagong Abahani	20	3	7	10	13	35	−22	16	
10	Rahmatganj MFS	20	3	5	12	21	39	−18	14	
11	Farashganj SC (R)	20	0	6	14	15	59	−44	6	2015–16 Bangladesh Championship League

Source: Soccerway
Rules for classification: 1) points; 2) goal difference; 3) number of goals scored.
(C) Champions; (Q) Qualify for the AFC competition; (R) Relegated

== Season statistics ==
=== Goalscorers ===
There have been 332 goals scored in 110 matches, for an average of 3.02 goals per match (as of 22 August 2015).

19 goals

- (Nigeria) Emeka Darlington (Sheikh Jamal DC)

17 goals

- (Haiti) Wedson Anselme (Sheikh Jamal DC)
- (Guinea) Ismael Bangoura (Dhaka Mohammedan)

15 goals

- (Haiti) Walson Augustin (Brothers Union)

14 goals

- (The Gambia) Landing Darboe (Sheikh Jamal DC)

13 goals

- (Bangladesh) Enamul Haque (Muktijoddha Sangsad KC)

10 goals

- (Cameroon) Paul Emile Biyaga (Sheikh Russel KC)
- (Nigeria) Sunday Chizoba (Dhaka Abahani)

9 goals

- (Nigeria) Akinyele Peter (Farashganj SC)

7 goals

- (Nigeria) Gideon Solomon (Rahmatganj MFS)
- (Bangladesh) Jewel Rana (Dhaka Mohammedan)
- (Senegal) Camara Sarba (Muktijoddha Sangsad KC)

6 goals

- (Bangladesh) Tawhidul Alam Sabuz (Dhaka Mohammedan)
- (Bangladesh) Jahid Hasan Ameli (Sheikh Russel KC)

5 goals

- (Bangladesh) Mannaf Rabby (Rahmatganj MFS)
- (Nigeria) Eleta Kingsley (Team BJMC)
- (The Gambia) Momodou Lamin Jatta (Feni Soccer Club)
- (Bangladesh) Sohel Miah (Feni Soccer Club)

4 goals

- (Hungary) Szabolcs Csorba (Dhaka Abahani)
- (Hungary) Gábor Demjén (Dhaka Abahani)
- (Nigeria) Kester Akon (Brothers Union)
- (Cameroon) Jean J Ikanga (Sheikh Russel KC)
- (Bangladesh) Nabib Newaj Jibon (Team BJMC)
- (The Gambia) Dawda Ceesay (Feni Soccer Club)
- (Bangladesh) Zahid Hossain (Sheikh Russel KC)
- (Bangladesh) Mamunul Islam (Sheikh Jamal DC)

3 goals

- (Bangladesh) Mohammad Ibrahim (Dhaka Mohammedan)
- (Bangladesh) Hemanta Vincent Biswas (Sheikh Russel KC)
- (Bangladesh) MD. Hanif (Chittagong Abahani)
- (Nigeria) Samson Iliasu (Team BJMC)
- (Bangladesh) Shahedul Alam Shahed (Dhaka Abahani)
- (Bangladesh) Nurul Absar (Rahmatganj MFS)
- (Bangladesh) Mehedi Hasan Tapu (Team BJMC)
- (Bangladesh) Ali Hosen (Feni Soccer Club)
- (Nigeria) Nkwocha Kingsley Chigozie (Sheikh Russel KC)
- (Bangladesh) Choumrin Rakhain (Chittagong Abahani)
- (Bangladesh) Nasirul Islam Nasir (Dhaka Abahani)
- (Bangladesh) Mithun Chowdhury (Sheikh Russel KC)

2 goals

- (Bangladesh) Wahed Ahmed (Dhaka Abahani)
- (Bangladesh) Shonko (Team BJMC)
- (Bangladesh) Saran Hawlader (Feni Soccer Club)
- (Bangladesh) Masuk Mia Jony (Dhaka Mohammedan)
- (Nigeria) Uche Felix (Farashganj SC)
- (Cameroon) Yoko Samnick (Chittagong Abahanii)
- (Bangladesh) Russel (Farashganj SC)
- (Bosnia and Herzegovina) Damir Ibrić (Sheikh Russel KC)
- (Bangladesh) MD. Helal (Rahmatganj MFS)
- (Bangladesh) Md. Rony (Brothers Union)
- (Bangladesh) Abdullah Al Mamun (Feni Soccer Club)
- (Nigeria) Ezoedika Simon (Brothers Union)

1 goal

- (Bangladesh) Arup Kumar Baidya (Dhaka Mohammedan)
- (Bangladesh) Kesto Kumar Bose (Sheikh Jamal DC)
- (Bangladesh) Sumon Ali (Chittagong Abahani)
- (Bangladesh) Mamun Mia (Dhaka Abahani)
- (Bangladesh) Kawsar Ali Rabbi (Brothers Union)
- (Egypt) Fekry Zeiada (Muktijoddha Sangsad KC)
- (Ghana) Abass Inussah (Muktijoddha Sangsad KC)
- (Nigeria) Adams Jankasa (Brothers Union)
- (Bangladesh) Rezaul Karim (Sheikh Russel KC)
- (Bangladesh) Abdul Baten Mojumdar Komol (Dhaka Abahani)
- (Bangladesh) Shariful (Brothers Union)
- (Bangladesh) Mohammad Biplob (Muktijoddha Sangsad KC)
- (Bangladesh) Sumon Ali (Chittagong Abahani)
- (Bangladesh) Hemu (Chittagong Abahani)
- (Haiti) Leonel Saint-Preux (Sheikh Jamal Dhanmondi Club)
- (Bangladesh) Mohammad Arafat (Rahmatganj MFS)
- (Bangladesh) Zahirul (Feni Soccer Club)
- (Bangladesh) Abdul Hannan Raju (Chittagong Abahani)
- (Bangladesh) Tara (Team BJMC)
- (Bangladesh) Biddut (Feni Soccer Club)
- (Bosnia and Herzegovina) Bojan Petric (Sheikh Russel KC)
- (Bangladesh) Jiku (Team BJMC)
- (Bangladesh) Mohamed Parvez (Muktijoddha Sangsad KC)
- (Bangladesh) Toklis Ahmed (Sheikh Jamal DC)
- (Ghana) Osei Morrison (Dhaka Abahani)
- (Bangladesh) Md. Sohel (Rahmatganj MFS)
- (Bangladesh) Mintu Sheikh (Dhaka Mohammedan)
- (Guinea) Lamime Camara (Rahmatganj MFS)
- (Bangladesh) Faisal Mahmud (Muktijoddha Sangsad KC)
- (Bangladesh) Pashbon Molla (Farashganj SC)
- (Bangladesh) Yeamin Munna (Sheikh Jamal Dhanmondi Club)
- (Bangladesh) Rummon Hossain (Sheikh Russel KC)
- (Bangladesh) Sohel Rana (Sheikh Jamal DC)
- (The Gambia) Alh Kebba Ceesay (Feni Soccer Club)
- (Bangladesh) Md. Linkon (Sheikh Jamal Dhanmondi Club)
- (Cameroon) Belinga Amabara (Dhaka Mohammedan)
- (Bangladesh) Koushik (Chittagong Abahanii)

=== Own goals ===
† Bold Club indicates winner of the match

Player	Club	Opponent	Result	Date
(Bangladesh) Mohammad Biplob	Muktijoddha SKC	Feni Soccer Club	2–1	8 April 2015
(Bangladesh) Monjurur Rahman Manik	Feni Soccer Club	Muktijoddha SKC	1–2	8 April 2015
(Bangladesh) Mazharul Islam Himel	Sheikh Jamal DC	Muktijoddha SKC	2–1	10 May 2015
(Bangladesh) Mostafizur Rahman Saikat	Farashganj SC	Brothers Union	1–3	7 July 2015
(Nigeria) David Udoh Brown	Farashganj SC	Rahmatganj MFS	2–2	10 July 2015
(Bangladesh) Alauddin	Feni Soccer Club	Farashganj SC	4–2	23 July 2015

=== Hat-tricks ===
Player	For	Against	Result	Date	Ref
(Haiti) Walson Augustin ^{4}	Brothers Union	Muktijoddha Sangsad KC	5–2	24 April 2015	
(Guinea) Ismael Bangoura	Dhaka Mohammedan	Rahmatganj MFS	5–0	16 May 2015	
(Bangladesh) Mamunul Islam	Sheikh Jamal DC	Farashganj SC	9–1	15 June 2015	
(Haiti) Wedson Anselme	Sheikh Jamal DC	Farashganj SC	9–1	15 June 2015	
(Nigeria) Emeka Darlington ^{4}	Sheikh Jamal DC	Feni Soccer Club	6–2	6 July 2015	
(Nigeria) Sunday Chizoba	Dhaka Abahani	Sheikh Russel KC	5–0	16 July 2015	
(Nigeria) Gideon Solomon	Rahmatganj MFS	Feni Soccer Club	3–6	17 July 2015	
(The Gambia) Landing Darboe	Sheikh Jamal DC	Brothers Union	5–1	25 July 2015	
(Cameroon) Paul Emile Biyaga	Sheikh Russel KC	Rahmatganj MFS	4–0	16 August 2015	

^{4} Player scored 4 goals.
