= 2016 Federation Cup (Bangladesh) =

28th season of the Bangladesh Federation Cup

Walton Federation Cup 2016

Tournament details
- Host country: Bangladesh
- Dates: 10 – 26 June 2016
- Teams: 12

Final positions
- Champions: Dhaka Abahani (9th title)
- Runners-up: Sheikh Moni Arambagh KS

Tournament statistics
- Matches played: 19
- Goals scored: 48 (2.53 per match)
- Top scorer: (Nigeria) Kester Akon (4 Goals)
- Best player: (Nigeria) Sunday Chizoba

The 2016 Federation Cup also known as Walton Federation Cup 2016 due to the sponsorship from Walton was the 28th edition of the tournament. A total of 12 teams competed in this tournament. Sheikh Jamal Dhanmondi Club was the winner of previous edition of the tournament.

The tournament kicked off on 10 June 2016 with the match between Mohammedan Sporting Club Limited and Rahmatganj Muslim Friends Society at the Bangabandhu National Stadium.

Dhaka Abahani lifted the title of Federation Cup with a 1–0 victory over Sheikh Moni Arambagh KS at the Bangabandhu National Stadium on 26 June 2016.

== Venues ==
Dhaka
Bangabandhu National Stadium
Capacity: 36,000
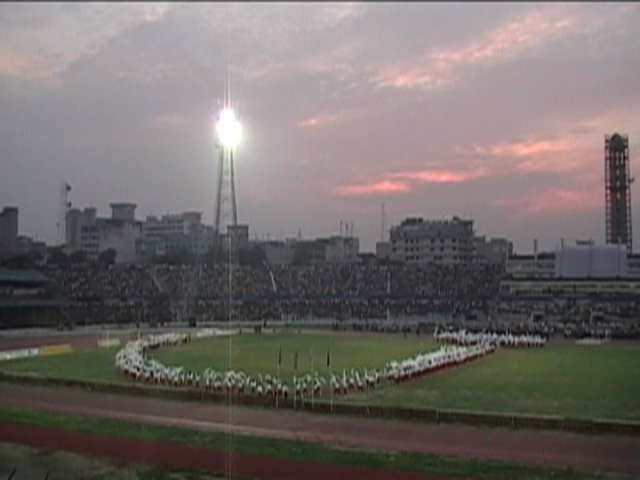

== Group stage ==
The twelve participants were divided into four groups. The top two teams for each group qualified for the quarter finals.

=== Group A ===
Pos	Team	Pld	W	D	L	GF	GA	GD	Pts
1	Arambagh KS (A)	2	1	1	0	2	1	+1	4
2	Dhaka Abahani (A)	2	1	0	1	1	1	0	3
3	Feni Soccer Club	2	0	1	1	1	2	−1	1

Source: bff.com.bd
(A) Advance to a further round
10 June 2016
19:30

Dhaka Abahani	0-1	Sheikh Moni Arambagh KS
		Mohammad Abdullah 25'

Bangabandhu National Stadium
12 June 2016
19:30

Feni Soccer Club	1-1	Sheikh Moni Arambagh KS
Akbor Hossain Ridon 90+2' (pen.)		Kester Akon 90'

Bangabandhu National Stadium
14 June 2016
16:00

Dhaka Abahani	1-0	Feni Soccer Club
Lee Tuck 1'

Bangabandhu National Stadium

=== Group B ===
Pos	Team	Pld	W	D	L	GF	GA	GD	Pts
1	Sheikh Russel KC (A)	2	1	1	0	4	1	+3	4
2	Muktijoddha Sangsad (A)	2	1	0	1	1	3	−2	3
3	Chittagong Abahani	2	0	1	1	1	2	−1	1

Source: bff.com.bd
(A) Advance to a further round
11 June 2016
19:30

Sheikh Russel KC	1-1	Chittagong Abahani
Jean Jules Ikanga 45+2'		Mohammad Ibrahim 5'

Bangabandhu National Stadium
13 June 2016
16:00

Muktijoddha Sangsad KC	1-0	Chittagong Abahani
Mohammad Robin 81'

Bangabandhu National Stadium
15 June 2016
16:00

Sheikh Russel KC	3-0	Muktijoddha Sangsad KC
Jean Jules Ikanga 29'; Shahedul Alam Shahed 32'; Paul Emile Biyaga 43'

Bangabandhu National Stadium

=== Group C ===
Pos	Team	Pld	W	D	L	GF	GA	GD	Pts
1	Brothers Union (A)	2	2	0	0	3	1	+2	6
2	Sk Jamal Dhanmondi (A)	2	1	0	1	7	4	+3	3
3	Uttar Baridhara	2	0	0	2	2	7	−5	0

Source: bff.com.bd
(A) Advance to a further round
11 June 2016
16:00

Sheikh Jamal Dhanmondi Club	6-2	Uttar Baridhara SC
Landing Darboe 23', 47', 64'; Wedson Anselme 30'; Enamul Haque 55'; Yeasin Khan 90+2'		Khalekuzzaman Sabuj 54' (pen.); Rohit Sarkar 70'

Bangabandhu National Stadium
13 June 2016
19:30

Brothers Union	1-0	Uttar Baridhara SC
Nkwocha Kingsley 31' (pen.)

Bangabandhu National Stadium
15 June 2016
19:30

Sheikh Jamal Dhanmondi Club	1-2	Brothers Union
Yeasin Khan 71'		Walson Augustin 82', 84'

Bangabandhu National Stadium

=== Group D ===
Pos	Team	Pld	W	D	L	GF	GA	GD	Pts
1	Team BJMC (A)	2	1	1	0	3	2	+1	4
2	Rahmatganj MFS (A)	2	0	2	0	3	3	0	2
3	Dhaka Mohammedan	2	0	1	1	3	4	−1	1

Source: bff.com.bd
(A) Advance to a further round
10 June 2016
16:00

Dhaka Mohammedan	2-2	Rahmatganj MFS
Ismael Bangoura 63'; Shahed Hossain 69'		Zunapio Siyo 3', 80'

Bangabandhu National Stadium
12 June 2016
16:00

Team BJMC	1-1	Rahmatganj MFS
Samson Iliasu 64'		Rafiqur Rahman Mamun 90'

Bangabandhu National Stadium
14 June 2016
19:30

Dhaka Mohammedan	1-2	Team BJMC
Ehsanul Haque Milon 67'		Mehedi Hassan Tapu 33', 83'

Bangabandhu National Stadium

== Bracket ==
Quarter Final
Arambagh KS	2(5)
Sheikh Jamal	2(4)
Team BJMC	1
Muktijoddha Sangsad	0
Brothers Union	1
Dhaka Abahani	2
Sheikh Russel	1
Rahmatganj MFS	0

Semi Final
Arambagh KS	3
Team BJMC	1
Dhaka Abahani	2
Sheikh Russel	1

Final
Arambagh KS	0
Dhaka Abahani	1

== Quarter final ==
=== Quarter final 1 ===
17 June 2016
15:45

Sheikh Moni Arambagh KS	2-2 (a.e.t.)	Sheikh Jamal Dhanmondi Club
Yoko Samnic Steve Thomas 61'; Kester Akon 69'	Report	Mohammad Linkon 42'; Wedson Anselme 45+1'
Penalties
Steve Thomas (penalty missed); Yussuf Issa (penalty scored); Polash (penalty scored); Abdul Hamid Khan Vashane (penalty scored); Kester Akon (penalty scored); Monsur Amin (penalty scored)	5–4	(penalty scored) Emeka Onuoha; (penalty scored) Wedson Anselme; (penalty missed) Enamul Haque; (penalty scored) Yeasin Khan; (penalty scored) Landing Darboe; (penalty missed) Kesto Kumar Bose

Bangabandhu National Stadium

=== Quarter final 2 ===
18 June 2016
15:45

Sheikh Russel KC	1-0 (a.e.t.)	Rahmatganj MFS
Paul Emile Biyaga 101'	Report

Bangabandhu National Stadium

=== Quarter final 3 ===
19 June 2016
15:45

Brothers Union	1-2	Dhaka Abahani
Walson Augustin 36'	Report	Jewel Rana 69'; Sunday Chizoba 80'

Bangabandhu National Stadium

=== Quarter final 4 ===
20 June 2016
15:45

Team BJMC	1-0	Muktijoddha Sangsad KC
Mehedi Hassan Tapu 90+4'	Report

Bangabandhu National Stadium

== Semi-final ==
=== Semi-final 1 ===
23 June 2016
15:45

Sheikh Moni Arambagh KS	3-1	Team BJMC
Kester Akon (64(pen.)), 69'; Zafor Iqbal 90+4'	Report	Zakir Hossain Jiku 38'

Bangabandhu National Stadium

=== Semi-final 2 ===
24 June 2016
19:30

Sheikh Russel KC	1-2	Dhaka Abahani
Rummon 64'	Report	Camara Sarba 4'; Sunday Chizoba 69'

Bangabandhu National Stadium

== Final ==
27 June 2016
15:30

Sheikh Moni Arambagh KS	0-1	Dhaka Abahani
	Report	Lee Tuck 11'

Bangabandhu National Stadium
Referee: Jalal Uddin

== Goal scorers ==
Top 5

No.	Name	Club	Goals
1.	(Nigeria) Kester Akon	Sheikh Moni Arambagh KS	4
2.	(Bangladesh) Mehedi Hassan Tapu	Team BJMC	3
3.	(The Gambia) Landing Darboe	Sheikh Jamal Dhanmondi Club	3
4.	(Haiti) Walson Augustin	Brothers Union	3
5.	(Bangladesh) Yeasin Khan	Sheikh Jamal Dhanmondi Club	2
