= Imtiaz Sultan Jitu =

Bangladeshi footballer

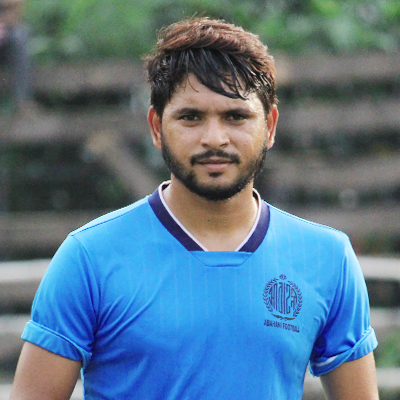
- Jitu with Dhaka Abahani in 2019

Personal information
- Date of birth: 10 February 1990 (age 36)
- Place of birth: Chittagong, Bangladesh
- Height: 1.70 m (5 ft 7 in)
- Position: Midfielder

Senior career*
Years	Team	Apps	(Gls)
2007–2008	Chittagong Abahani		
2008–2009	Chittagong Mohammedan		
2009–2010	Farashganj SC		
2010–2012	Dhaka Abahani		
2012–2013	Dhaka Mohammedan		
2013–2014	Muktijoddha Sangsad		
2014–2016	Brothers Union		
2016–2019	Dhaka Abahani	9	(0)
2019–2021	Sheikh Jamal DC	2	(0)
2021	Brothers Union	10	(1)
2021–2023	Dhaka Abahani	1	(0)
2023–2024	Fortis FC	0	(0)
2024–2025	Chittagong Abahani	2	(1)

International career
2005–2007	Bangladesh U17	3	(0)
2009–2010	Bangladesh U23	8	(1)
2010	Bangladesh	1	(0)
Medal record
Representing Bangladesh
South Asian Games
Gold medal – first place	2010
- * Club domestic league appearances and goals as of 4 January 2025

Imtiaz Sultan Jitu (Bengali: ইমতিয়াজ সুলতান জিতু; born 10 February 1990) is a Bangladeshi professional footballer who plays as a midfielder. He last played for Chittagong Abahani. He began his professional football career with Chittagong Abahani in 2007 and appeared with the Bangladesh national team in 2010.

== Honours ==
Abahani Limited Dhaka

- Bangladesh Premier League: 2016, 2017–18
- Federation Cup: 2010, 2016, 2017, 2018, 2021–22
- Independence Cup: 2021–22

Bangladesh U23

- South Asian Games Gold medal: 2010
