= Mazharul Islam Himel =

Bangladeshi footballer

Personal information
- Full name: Mohammad Mazharul Islam Himel
- Date of birth: 16 September 1988 (age 38)
- Place of birth: Kishoreganj, Bangladesh
- Height: 1.80 m (5 ft 11 in)
- Position: Goalkeeper

Youth career
- 2003–2004: Badda Jagoroni

Senior career*
| Years | Team | Apps | (Gls) |
| 2004–2005 | Dhanmondi Club | | (0) |
| 2005–2007 | Mohammedan SC | | (0) |
| 2008–2010 | Sheikh Russel KC | | (0) |
| 2010–2011 | Dhaka Abahani | | (0) |
| 2011–2012 | Team BJMC | | (0) |
| 2012–2013 | Dhaka Abahani | | (0) |
| 2013–2018 | Sheikh Jamal DC | | (0) |
| 2018 | Arambagh KS | 24 | (0) |
| 2020 | Mohammedan SC | 1 | (0) |
| 2021 | Chittagong Abahani | 2 | (0) |

International career^{‡}
| 2003–2004 | Bangladesh U17 | | (0) |
| 2006–2010 | Bangladesh U23 | | (0) |
| 2006–2015 | Bangladesh | 2 | (0) |
Medal record
Representing Bangladesh U-23
South Asian Games
| Gold medal – first place | 2010 |
- * Club domestic league appearances and goals as of 1 July 2021 ‡ National team caps and goals as of 15 October 2019

Mazharul Islam Himel (Bengali: মাজহারুল ইসলাম হিমেল; born 16 September 1988) is a former Bangladeshi footballer who played as a goalkeeper. While playing for the under-17 national football team, Himel joined Badda Jagorani before moving to Dhanmondi Club. In 2005, he joined Mohammedan SC.

== Early career ==
Himel started playing football while a student at the Azim Uddin High School in Kishoreganj. Azim Uddin High School won Kishoreganj, Mymensingh and Dhaka divisional school football championships during Himel's tenure as the goalkeeper there. Himel brought victory to the Kishoreganj district football team through a tiebreaker in Bhaluka, Mymensingh for the Kishoreganj district team.

== Club career ==
In his first season at the club, he won the 2005–06 National Football League. He won two league titles with Sheikh Jamal Dhanmondi Club, previously known as Dhanmondi Club, and was the club's first choice goalkeeper for almost half a decade following his return in 2013. He was also part of the team that finished runners-up in the 2014 IFA Shield, in India. In November 2019, Himel was named Mohammedan's captain for the season.

== International career ==
Himel represented Bangladesh U17 during the 2004 AFC U-17 Championship, in Japan. Himel was called up to the Bangladesh national team by coach Andrés Cruciani in 2006. He was part of the Bangladesh U23 team during both the 2006 Asian Games and the 2010 Asian Games. He was second choice to Aminul Haque when the Olympic team clinched gold in the 2010 South Asian Games, on home soil. In 2015, Himel, returned to the national team under head coach Jamie Day, after almost a decade. His only two appearances for the senior national team came between a span of nine years.

== Personal life ==
Himel's father Jinnatul Islam was a sports organizer and a member of many other organizations. Himel is the youngest of three brothers and older than two of his three sisters . He is an executive member of Kishoreganj Football District Association.He was raised in the kishoreganj district along his siblings with his father being a lawyer.

== Honours ==
Mohammedan SC

- National League: 2005–06

Abahani Limited Dhaka

- Federation Cup: 2010

Sheikh Jamal Dhanmondi Club

- Bangladesh Premier League: 2013–14, 2014–15
- Federation Cup: 2013–14, 2014–15
- King's Cup: 2014

Bangladesh U-23

- South Asian Games Gold medal: 2010
