= Jamal Bhuyan =

Bangladeshi footballer (born 1990)

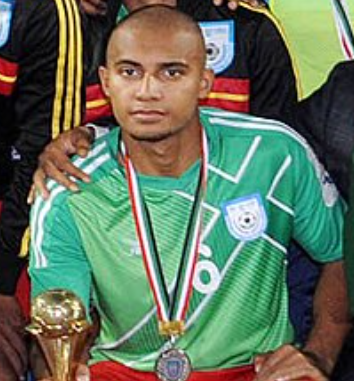
- Bhuyan in 2015

Personal information
- Full name: Jamal Haris Bhuyan
- Date of birth: 10 April 1990 (age 36)
- Place of birth: Copenhagen, Denmark
- Height: 1.73 m (5 ft 8 in)
- Position: Defensive midfielder

Team information
- Current team: Brothers Union
- Number: 6

Youth career
- 2005: Brøndby IF
- 2005–2009: Copenhagen

Senior career*
Years	Team	Apps	(Gls)
2009–2012	Hellerup IK	0	(0)
2012	Dhaka Abahani	?	(0)
2012–2013	BK Avarta	0	(0)
2013–2014	Avedøre IF	0	(0)
2014–2016	Sheikh Jamal DC	?	(0)
2016–2017	Sheikh Russel KC	?	(0)
2017–2022	Saif	78	(1)
2019	→ Chittagong Abahani (loan)	0	(0)
2020–2021	→ Kolkata Mohammedan (loan)	5	(0)
2022–2023	Sheikh Russel KC	13	(0)
2023–2024	Sol de Mayo	4	(0)
2024	Dhaka Abahani	5	(0)
2025–	Brothers Union	19	(0)

International career^{‡}
2014–2018	Bangladesh U23	8	(1)
2013–	Bangladesh	99	(1)
Medal record
Men's football
Representing Bangladesh
South Asian Games
Bronze medal – third place	2016 India	Team
Bronze medal – third place	2019 Nepal	Team
- * Club domestic league appearances and goals as of 24 May 2026 ‡ National team caps and goals as of 14 November 2026

Jamal Haris Bhuyan (Bengali: জামাল হ্যারিস ভূঁইয়া, pronounced [dʒamal ɦæris bʱũija]; born 10 April 1990) is a professional footballer who plays as a midfielder for Bangladesh Football League club Brothers Union. Born in Denmark, he plays for the Bangladesh national team.

== Early life ==
Bhuyan was born in Glostrup, Denmark and grew up in the suburb of Brøndby Nord. His parents migrated to Denmark from Bangladesh in the late 1960s. At the age of 15, Bhuyan began playing for the youth team of Brøndby IF, scoring against F.C. Copenhagen's reserves. After the match, the opposition coach met him and offered him a place in the team, which Bhuyan accepted.

By the time Bhuyan turned 16, he was on the verge of being promoted to the senior team of Copenhagen. However, his career was struck with a massive blow after he got stuck in the middle of a gang fight. He was shot four times. One of the bullets reportedly missed his heart by two centimetres. He found himself lying in the hospital bed after being in a coma for two days, later undergoing 12 surgeries, and although the chances of him playing professional football were slim, he returned to the game, eventually having to drop down to the lower divisions of Denmark. He later opened up in an interview about the difficulties he faced while returning to football, stating: "A few people around me, they died. But, you know, I survived. Because of the injury, I did not have any feeling in my right hand. So the doctors wanted to take some nerves from my foot and put it up in my arm. But I told them, I need my legs."

== Club career ==
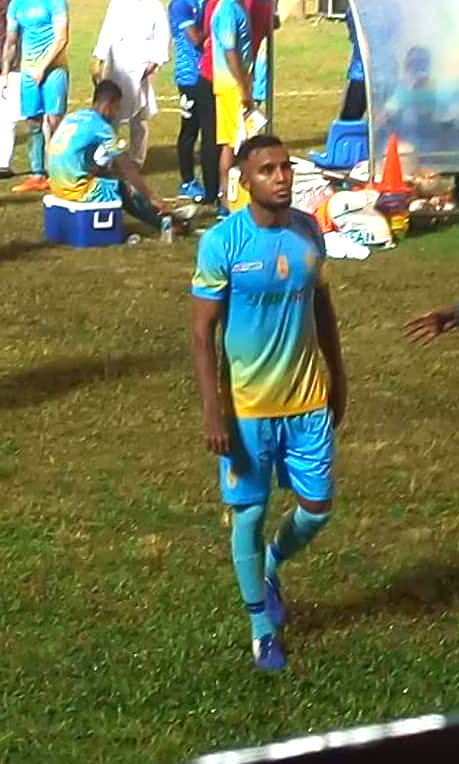
Jamal playing for Chittagong Abahani in the 2019 Sheikh Kamal International Club Cup

Bhuyan began his senior career with Danish 2nd Division club Hellerup IK, where he spent 3 seasons and scored one goal in one match.

In 2012, Bhuyan joined Abahani Limited Dhaka, one of the biggest clubs in Bangladesh. After a two-year stint, during which he also made his national team debut, he returned to Denmark for a brief period, playing for the second division clubs BK Avarta and Avedøre IF.

In 2014, Bhuyan returned to Bangladesh by joining the Sheikh Jamal Dhanmondi Club. In his debut season, he won the domestic double, lifting both the 2015 Bangladesh Premier League and 2015 Federation Cup. He also earned his first continental trophy, winning the 2014 King's Cup in Bhutan. He later went on to make six appearances for the club in their disappointing 2016 AFC Cup campaign. In 2016, he moved to Sheikh Russel KC, with whom he scored two goals in the league.

In the 2017–18 season, Bhuyan joined the Saif SC. He played for the Chittagong Abahani on loan only in the 2019 Sheikh Kamal International Club Cup. He scored one goal against Laos club Young Elephants. In 2019, he was made captain of the Saif SC. In 2020, he joined the Indian club Kolkata Mohammedan in the I-League on a season-long loan deal. In the match against the Churchill Brothers, Bhuyan became only the second Bangladeshi to captain an Indian football club when he wore the armband for Mohammedan, the first being Monem Munna who captained East Bengal in the 1990s.

In August 2023, Bhuyan joined the Argentine club Club Sol de Mayo in the Torneo Federal A, following months of speculation. Initially, he was set to remain at the Sheikh Russel KC, as the club included him in their squad list for the 2023–24 season, however, Bhuyan confirmed his transfer to Sol de Mayo after Sheikh Russel failed to pay his dues from the previous year.

== International career ==
In 2008, at age 18, Bhuyan was sent an offer letter to represent the Bangladesh national team from the Bangladesh Football Federation. However, he had to turn down the offer due to family complications.

On 31 August 2013, Bhuyan made his debut for Bangladesh against Nepal in the 2013 SAFF Championship, becoming the first non-resident player to represent the national side. Bhuyan became the MVP (most valuable player) in the Bangabandhu Cup where eight countries took part.

On 19 August 2018, Bhuyan scored the winning goal in the stoppage time in a 1–0 victory over the Qatar U23 to help the Bangladesh under-23 national team qualify for the round of 16 in the 2018 Asian Games and also created history by making Bangladesh qualify for the first time in the Asian Games's knockout stage.

Bhuyan with head coach Javier Cabrera in 2024

Bhuyan scored his first senior international goal on 13 November 2021 against Maldives at the Racecourse Ground.

== Personal life ==
On 18 May 2019, he was invited to the La Liga studio for a live commentary along with Joe Morrison and John Burridge. The match was between Real Valladolid and Valencia CF. He was also the commentator for the match between SD Eibar and FC Barcelona.

On 5 January 2020, Bhuyan got married. the wedding ceremony took place in his birthplace, Copenhagen, Denmark.

== Career statistics ==
As of 14 November 2026

Appearances and goals by national team and year
National team	Year	Apps	Goals
Bangladesh	2013	3	0
Bangladesh	2014	3	0
Bangladesh	2015	14	0
Bangladesh	2016	6	0
Bangladesh	2018	7	0
Bangladesh	2019	9	0
Bangladesh	2020	5	0
Bangladesh	2021	13	1
Bangladesh	2022	8	0
Bangladesh	2023	13	0
Bangladesh	2024	6	0
Bangladesh	2025	5	0
Bangladesh	2026	7	0
Total		99	1

Scores and results list Bangladesh's goal tally first.

No.	Date	Venue	Opponent	Score	Result	Competition
1.	13 November 2021	Racecourse Ground, Colombo	Maldives	1–0	2–1	2021 Mahinda Rajapaksa Trophy

== Filmography ==
Bhuyan make his debut in acting with the web series Brazentina (2026) directed by Tarique Muhammad Hasan.

=== Web series ===
Year	Series	Role	Notes	Ref.
2026	Brazentina	Jamal	Debut in web series on iScreen	

== Honours ==
Sheikh Jamal Dhanmondi Club

- Bangladesh Football League: 2015
- Federation Cup: 2014–15
- Kings Cup: 2014

Bangladesh U23

- South Asian Games bronze medal: 2016, 2019

Bangladesh

- Bangabandhu Gold Cup runner-up: 2015

Individual

- 2015 Bangabandhu Cup Player of the Tournament
- 2014 King's Cup Player of the Tournament
