= Arup Kumar Baidya =

Bangladeshi footballer

Personal information
- Full name: Arup Kumar Baidya
- Date of birth: 2 September 1987 (age 39)
- Place of birth: Magura Sadar, Bangladesh
- Height: 1.65 m (5 ft 5 in)
- Positions: Full-back; left midfielder

Senior career*
Years	Team	Apps	(Gls)
2007–2009	Farashganj SC		
2009–2010	Muktijoddha Sangsad		
2010–2011	Dhaka Abahani		
2011–2012	Farashganj SC		
2012–2013	Sheikh Jamal DC		
2013–2016	Mohammedan SC		
2016–2018	Sheikh Russel KC	7	(0)
2018–2019	Chittagong Abahani	21	(0)
2019–2021	Brothers Union	22	(0)

International career
2000	Bangladesh U19		
2010	Bangladesh U23		
2008	Bangladesh	5	(1)
Medal record
Representing Bangladesh U-23
South Asian Games
Gold medal – first place	2010
- * Club domestic league appearances and goals

Arup Kumar Baidya (Bengali: অরূপ কুমার বৈদ্য; born 7 September 1987) is a retired Bangladeshi footballer who played as either a left back or left midfielder. He represented the Bangladesh national team in 2008.

== International goals ==
=== Bangladesh national team ===
#	Date	Venue	Opponent	Score	Result	Competition	Source
1.	4 June 2008	Sugathadasa Stadium, Colombo	Bhutan	1–1	1–1	2008 SAFF Championship	

== Honours ==
Abahani Limited Dhaka

- Federation Cup: 2010

Sheikh Russel KC

- Bangabandhu Gold Cup: 2017

Bangladesh U23

- South Asian Games Gold medal: 2010
