= Enamul Haque (footballer) =

Bangladeshi footballer

Personal information
- Full name: Enamul Haque
- Date of birth: 1 November 1985 (age 41)
- Place of birth: Naogaon, Bangladesh
- Height: 1.70 m (5 ft 7 in)
- Position: Centre forward

Senior career*
Years	Team	Apps	(Gls)
2003–2004	Fakirerpool YMC	?	(5)
2005–2006	Muktijoddha Sangsad	?	(?)
2007–2008	Mohammedan SC	?	(0)
2008–2009	Farashganj SC	20	(13)
2009–2010	Dhaka Abahani	24	(21)
2010–2011	Sheikh Jamal DC	?	(2)
2011–2013	Dhaka Abahani	?	(0)
2013–2015	Muktijoddha Sangsad	?	(16)
2016–2019	Sheikh Jamal DC	27	(2)
2019	Brothers Union	5	(0)

International career
2010	Bangladesh U23	8	(3)
2009–2016	Bangladesh	16	(7)
Medal record
Representing Bangladesh U-23
South Asian Games
Gold medal – first place	2010
- * Club domestic league appearances and goals

Enamul Haque (Bengali: এনামুল হক; born 1 November 1985) is a retired Bangladeshi professional footballer who played as a striker. He holds the record as the only Bangladeshi Golden Boot winner in the Bangladesh Premier League. He represented the Bangladesh national team from 2009 to 2016, scoring 7 goals in 16 games.

== Club career ==
Enamul began his career in the Dhaka First Division League with Fakirerpool Young Men's Club. He helped the club gain promotion as champions in the 2003–04 season, finishing the league as the club's top scorer with 5 goals.

In 2005, Enamul joined Muktijoddha Sangsad KC in the Dhaka Premier Division League. In his debut season at the club he scored a stoppage time goal as Muktijoddha defeated Turkmen club Nebitçi Balkanabat 1–0 in the 2005 AFC Cup.

He made his career breakthrough with Farashganj SC during the 2008–09 B.League season by scoring 13 goals in 20 games. He also made headlines by scoring five goals against Khulna Abahani in a 7–0 win. His best season came during the 2009–10 season with Abahani Limited Dhaka. He won the domestic double, and with his 21 goals in the 2009–10 Bangladesh League, he also became the first local player in Bangladesh Premier League history to finish the season as the highest goalscorer. He was also the Man of the Match in the 2010 Federation Cup final.

In 2010, Enamul moved to the high-spending Sheikh Jamal Dhanmondi Club. However, after spending most of the season on the bench, he lost his spot in the national team. In November 2011, Enamul returned to Abahani. In January 2012, he ruptured his knee during a practice session and was kept out of action for almost a whole year. He made a return to form during the 2014–15 Bangladesh Premier League season with 13 goals in about 20 matches for Muktijoddha. Nonetheless, after suffering from continuous injuries the following few years, he retired while playing for Brothers Union in 2019.

== International career ==
On 26 April 2009, Brazilian coach Dido handed Enamul his senior international debut against Cambodia in the 2010 AFC Challenge Cup qualifiers. Enamul went on to score the lone goal in the match, handing Bangladesh their first victory in almost three years.

Enamul scored 4 goals in the 2009 SAFF Championship and was the joint-top scorer in the tournament. In 2015, Dutch coach Lodewijk de Kruif recalled Enamul to the national team for the 2018 FIFA World Cup qualifiers, after the striker was out of international football for half a decade due to a knee injury.

== Personal life ==
In 2014, Enamul, along with 14 other national footballers, joined the Bangladesh Nationalist Party.

Enamul became a full-time pharmacist following his retirement in 2019.

== Career statistics ==
=== International ===
As of 10 October 2016.

National team	Year	Apps	Goals
Bangladesh	2009	6	6
Bangladesh	2010	3	1
Bangladesh	2015	6	0
Bangladesh	2016	1	0
Total		16	7

=== International goals ===
==== Olympic Team ====
#	Date	Venue	Opponent	Score	Result	Competition
1.	1 February 2010	Bangabandhu National Stadium	Bhutan U-23	1–0	4–0	2010 South Asian Games
2.	8 February 2010	Bangabandhu National Stadium	Afghanistan U-23	2–0	4–0	2010 South Asian Games
3.	11 November 2010	Huadu Stadium	Hong Kong U-23	1–1	1–4	2010 Asian Games

==== Senior team ====
#	Date	Venue	Opponent	Score	Result	Competition
1.	26 April 2009	Bangabandhu National Stadium	Cambodia	1–0	1–0	2010 AFC Challenge Cup qualification
2.	28 April 2009	Bangabandhu National Stadium	Myanmar	1–0	1–2	2010 AFC Challenge Cup qualification
3.	4 December 2009	Bangabandhu National Stadium	Bhutan	2–0	4–1	2009 SAFF Championship
4.	4 December 2009	Bangabandhu National Stadium	Bhutan	3–1	4–1	2009 SAFF Championship
5.	8 December 2009	Bangabandhu National Stadium	Sri Lanka	1–0	2–1	2009 SAFF Championship
6.	8 December 2009	Bangabandhu National Stadium	Sri Lanka	2–1	2–1	2009 SAFF Championship
7.	16 February 2010	Sugathadasa Stadium	Tajikistan	1–0	2–1	2010 AFC Challenge Cup

=== International goals for clubs ===
==== Muktijoddha Sangsad KC ====
#	Date	Venue	Opponent	Score	Result	Competition
1.	6 April 2005	Balkanabat Stadium	(Turkmenistan) Nebitçi Balkanabat	1–0	1–0	2005 AFC Cup

==== Abahani Limited Dhaka ====
#	Date	Venue	Opponent	Score	Result	Competition
1.	12 May 2010	Bangabandhu National Stadium	(Nepal) New Road Team	1–0	2–0	2010 AFC President's Cup
2.	12 May 2010	Bangabandhu National Stadium	(Nepal) New Road Team	2–0	2–0	2010 AFC President's Cup

== Honours ==
Fakirerpool YMC

- Dhaka First Division League: 2003–04

Mohammedan SC

- Federation Cup: 2008

Abahani Limited Dhaka

- Bangladesh Premier League: 2009–10, 2012
- Federation Cup: 2010
- Bordoloi Trophy: 2010

Sheikh Jamal Dhanmondi Club

- Bangladesh Premier League: 2010–11

Bangladesh U23

- South Asian Games Gold medal: 2010

=== Individual ===
- Bangladesh Premier League top scorer: 2009–10
- SAFF Championship top scorer: 2009
