= Amer Khan (footballer, born 1971) =

Bangladeshi footballer

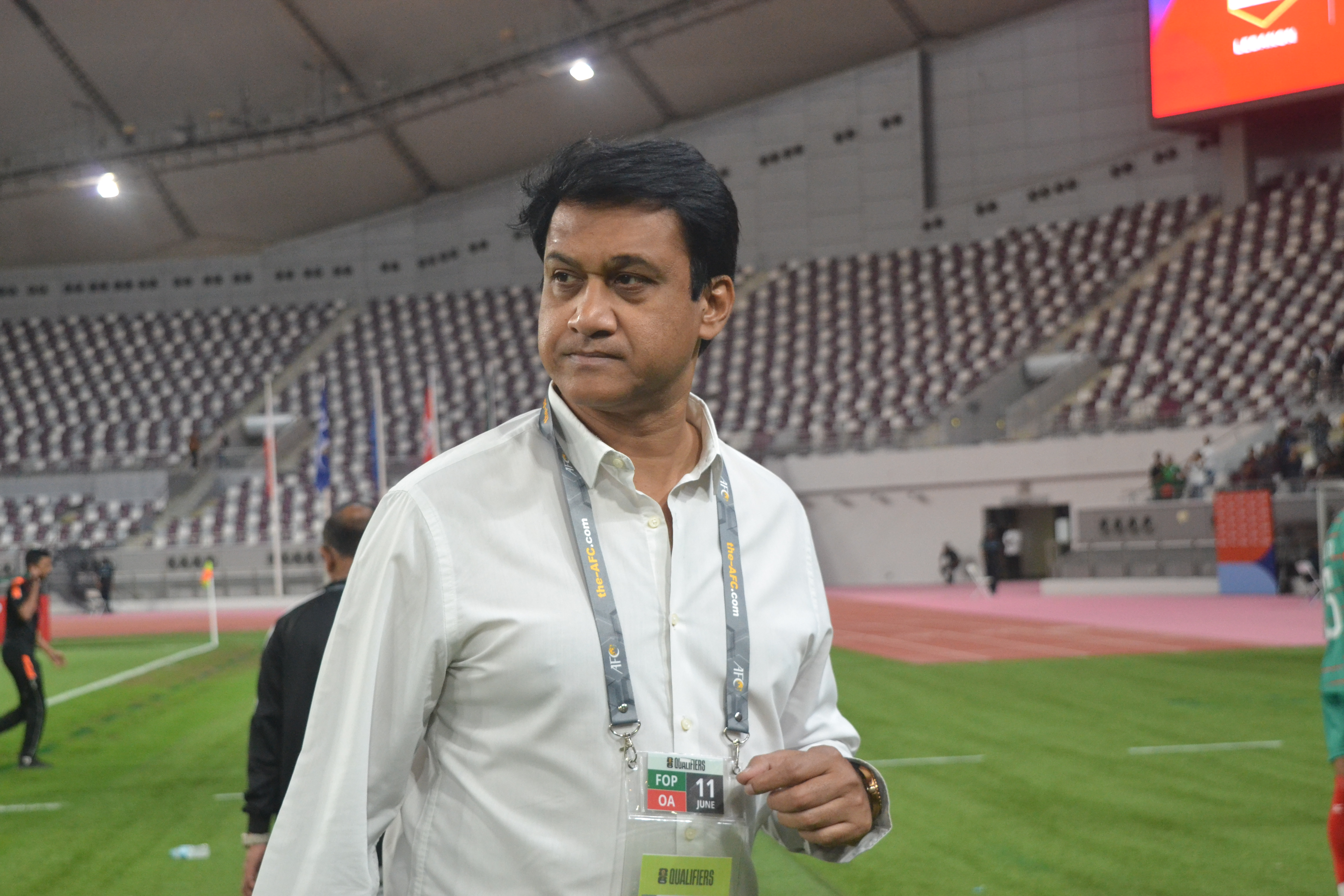

Personal information
- Full name: Mohammed Amer Khan
- Date of birth: 9 November 1971 (age 54)
- Place of birth: Dhaka, Bangladesh
- Height: 1.86 m (6 ft 1 in)
- Position: Midfielder

Senior career*
Years	Team	Apps	(Gls)
1989–1992	Brothers Union		
1993	Fakirerpool YMC		
1994–2001	Brothers Union		

International career
1998	Bangladesh U19		
- * Club domestic league appearances and goals

Amer Khan (Bengali: আমের খান; born 9 November 1971) is a Bangladeshi football coach and former player who serves as the team manager for Bangladesh Football League club Brothers Union and the Bangladesh national team.

== Playing career ==
Amer began his football career with the Gopibagh-based club Brothers Union in the 1989–90 First Division League. In 1993, he joined Fakirerpool Young Men's Club and helped them earn promotion to the top-tier as second-tier champions. He returned to Brothers Union in 1994 and was eventually appointed captain a few years later. In 1998, he represented the Bangladesh U19 team during the 1998 AFC Youth Championship qualifiers in Sri Lanka. He remained with Brothers Union until his retirement in 2001.

== Post-playing career ==
=== Brothers Union (2002–present) ===
Following his retirement, Amer was named the executive director and team manager of Brothers Union in 2002. He found early success as Brothers lifted their first Dhaka Premier Division League title in the 2003–04 season without a full-time head coach, as both Syed Nayeemuddin and S M Abu Noman Nannu served as coaches during games. Amer was eventually made the general secretary of Little Friends Club, which serves as the junior team to Brothers.

On 5 August 2012, Amer Khan declared on Ekattor TV that Brothers Union were forced to play a fixed match against eventual champions, Abahani Limited Dhaka, on 26 May of the same year in the 2012 Bangladesh Premier league. Amer stated "Is it too difficult to understand how we lost 2-4 against Abahani when they were playing with 10 men? We had to do so because there were specific instructions given to us to lose. When an influential political leader tells you to throw away the match, what else could you do?"

On 9 August 2012, Amer claimed that his comments regarding the fixed match were aired out of context. Eventually, the vice president of the Bangladesh Football Federation (BFF) at the time, Abdus Salam Murshedy, later revealed that the league committee would handle the matter instead of the Fixed-Match Identification Committee.

Following Brothers' relegation from the Premier League in the 2020–21 season, Amer informed that the club would not participate in the 2021–22 Championship League (second-tier) due to financial difficulties while also criticizing the BFF's decision to relegate the club during the COVID-19 pandemic. Nevertheless, the club returned to the top-flight by winning the Championship League the following season.

=== Bangladesh Football Federation (2020–present) ===
Amer served as the team manager of the Bangladesh U19 national team in both 2014 and 2019. He was elected as a BFF executive member after the 3 October 2020 Elective Congress. In November 2020, Amer was appointed as the team manager of the Bangladesh national team, led by head coach Jamier Day. However, he tested positive for COVID-19 when the team traveled to Doha, Qatar for the 2022 FIFA World Cup qualification – AFC second round.

In June 2023, Amer was reappointed as the team manager of the Bangladesh national team for the 2023 SAFF Championship.

== Personal life ==
Amer attended Ramakrishna Mission High School and later graduated from Jagannath University in 1994. He married Rona Akhtar in 2007.

== Honours ==
Brothers Union

- Federation Cup: 1991

Fakirerpool YMC

- Dhaka First Division League: 1993
