= Abdul Baten Mojumdar Komol =

Bangladeshi footballer

Abdul Baten Komol
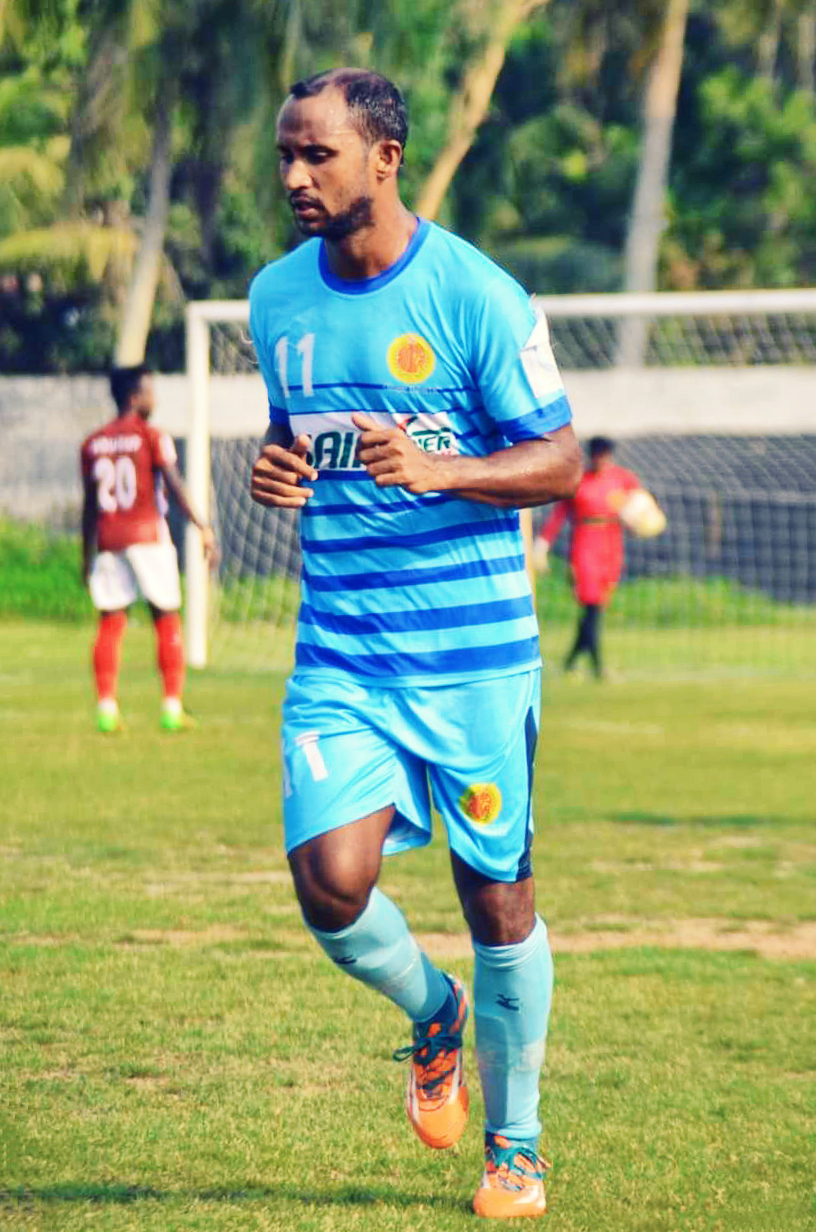
- Komol with Chittagong Abahani in 2019

Personal information
- Full name: Abdul Baten Mojumdar Komol
- Date of birth: 2 August 1987 (age 39)
- Place of birth: Feni, Bangladesh
- Height: 1.65 m (5 ft 5 in)
- Positions: Winger; midfielder

Senior career*
Years	Team	Apps	(Gls)
2003–05	Basabo		
2005–07	Fakirerpool		
2008–10	Mohammedan		
2010–12	Sheikh Jamal		
2012–15	Dhaka Abahani		
2017–18	Mohammedan	12	(0)
2018–19	Chittagong Abahani	3	(0)
2020	Arambagh	4	(0)

International career^{‡}
2010	Bangladesh U23	5	(1)
2008–15	Bangladesh	27	(1)

Managerial career
- 2022–2023: Sheikh Russel KC (assistant)
Medal record
Representing Bangladesh
South Asian Games
Gold medal – first place	2010
- * Club domestic league appearances and goals as of 2 March 2020 ‡ National team caps and goals as of 17 November 2015

Abdul Baten Mojumdar Komol (Bengali: আব্দুল বাতেন মজুমদার কমল; born 2 August 1987) is a retired Bangladeshi professional footballer who last worked as the assistant coach of Sheikh Russel KC. He represented the Bangladesh national team between 2008 and 2015.

== Club career ==
Komol participated in the 2005 JFA Cup and later went onto make his Premier Division League debut with Fakirerpool Young Men's Club in the same year. In 2009, Komol played an important role in Mohammedan SC's Super Cup triumph. He retired after playing for Arambagh KS in 2019–20 Bangladesh Premier League season, which was abandoned due to the COVID-19 pandemic in Bangladesh.

== International career ==
Komol debuted for Bangladesh during the 2008 SAFF Championship where he played in all three games, wearing the number 20 jersey. He also scored in the final of the 2010 South Asian Games against Afghanistan U23 as Bangladesh U23 secured gold. He later represented the senior team during the 2014 FIFA World Cup qualifiers. On 23 March 2011, Komol scored his first senior international goal against Myanmar at the AFC Challenge Cup qualifiers.

== Coaching career ==
Komol graduated with a degree in Civil Engineering but decided to stick with football even after his playing career ended. After retiring from professional football in 2020, Komol completed the AFC 'C' License Coaches Course in October of the same year. He began his coaching career in his hometown with Chagalnaiya Pilot High School in Feni, the same high school he attended and played for at the youth level. In December 2020, Komol guided the team to the National School Football Championship.

== International goals ==
Scores and results list Bangladesh's goal tally first.

#	Date	Venue	Opponent	Score	Result	Competition
1.	23 March 2011	Yangon, Myanmar	Myanmar	2–0	2–0	2012 AFC Challenge Cup qualifiers

== Honours ==
Fakirerpool

- Dhaka Senior Division League: 2007–08

Mohammedan

- Super Cup: 2009

Bangladesh U-23

- South Asian Games Gold medal: 2010

Sheikh Jamal

- Bangladesh Premier League: 2010–11
- Federation Cup: 2011–12
- Pokhara Cup: 2011

Dhaka Abahani

- Bangladesh Premier League: 2012
