= Football at the 2010 South Asian Games – Men's tournament =

2010 South Asian Games
Bangladesh 2010

Tournament details
- Host country: Dhaka, Bangladesh
- Dates: 29 January – 8 February 2010
- Teams: 8 (from 1 confederation)
- Venues: 2 (in 2 host cities)

Final positions
- Champions: Bangladesh (2nd title)
- Runners-up: Afghanistan
- Third place: Maldives

Tournament statistics
- Matches played: 16
- Goals scored: 31 (1.94 per match)
- Top scorer(s): (Afghanistan) Balal Arezou (6 goals)

Men's football tournament at 2010 South Asian Games from 29 January to 8 February in Bangladesh.

== Fixtures and results ==
=== Group A ===
Team	Pld	W	D	L	GF	GA	GD	Pts
Afghanistan	3	3	0	0	5	1	+4	9
India	3	1	1	1	5	2	+3	4
Sri Lanka	3	1	1	1	1	2	–1	4
Pakistan	3	0	0	3	2	8	–6	0

29 January 2010

India	0–1	Afghanistan
		Arezou 43'

MA Aziz Stadium, Chattogram
29 January 2010

Sri Lanka	1–0	Pakistan
MA Kaiz 6'

MA Aziz Stadium, Chattogram

31 January 2010

India	0–0	Sri Lanka

MA Aziz Stadium, Chattogram
31 January 2010

Pakistan	1–2	Afghanistan
Mehmood 67'		Arezou 16', 83'

MA Aziz Stadium, Chattogram

2 February 2010

Sri Lanka	0–2	Afghanistan
		Arezou

MA Aziz Stadium, Chattogram
2 February 2010

India	5–1	Pakistan
Jeje 35', 52', 78'; Sarkar; Ralte		Rizwan 3'

MA Aziz Stadium, Chattogram

=== Group B ===
Team	Pld	W	D	L	GF	GA	GD	Pts
Bangladesh	3	3	0	0	8	0	+8	9
Maldives	3	2	0	1	2	1	+1	6
Nepal	3	1	0	2	2	4	–2	3
Bhutan	3	0	0	3	0	7	–7	0

30 January 2010

Maldives	1–0	Bhutan
Ashfaq 84'

Bangabandhu National Stadium, Dhaka
30 January 2010

Bangladesh	3–0	Nepal
Mamunul 7'; Meshu 87'; Mithun 90+1'

Bangabandhu National Stadium, Dhaka

1 February 2010

Nepal	0–1	Maldives
		Umair 15' (pen.)

Bangabandhu National Stadium, Dhaka
1 February 2010

Bangladesh	4–0	Bhutan
Enamul 42'; Nasirul 50'; Yusuf 68'; Jitu 76' (pen.)

Bangabandhu National Stadium, Dhaka

3 February 2010

Nepal	2–0	Bhutan
Gurung 35', 73'

Bangabandhu National Stadium, Dhaka
3 February 2010

Bangladesh	1–0	Maldives
Zahid 44'

Bangabandhu National Stadium, Dhaka

=== Semi finals ===
5 February 2010

India	0–1	Bangladesh
		Sabuz 85'

Bangabandhu National Stadium, Dhaka

5 February 2010

Maldives	0–1	Afghanistan
		Arezou 72'

Bangabandhu National Stadium, Dhaka

=== Third place play-off ===
7 February 2010

India	0–0	Maldives ( Bronze)
Penalties
	1–3

Bangabandhu National Stadium, Dhaka

=== Final ===
8 February 2010

( Gold) Bangladesh	4–0	Afghanistan ( Silver)
Meshu 18'; Enamul 24'; Komol 69'; Sabuz 88'

Bangabandhu National Stadium, Dhaka

== Winner ==
Football at the 2010 South Asian Games

Bangladesh
Second title

== Goalscorers ==
There have been 31 goals scored in 16 matches, for an average of 1.94 goals per match.

6 goals

- (Afghanistan) Balal Arezou

3 goals

- (India) Jeje Lalpekhlua

2 goals

- (Bangladesh) Atiqur Rahman Meshu
- (Bangladesh) Enamul Haque
- (Bangladesh) Tawhidul Alam Sabuz
- (Nepal) Anil Gurung

1 goal

- (India) Tirthankar Sarkar
- (India) Lalrindika Ralte
- (Bangladesh) Mamunul Islam Mamun
- (Bangladesh) Mithun Chowdhury
- (Bangladesh) Nasirul Islam Nasir
- (Bangladesh) Imtiaz Sultan Jitu
- (Bangladesh) Mohamed Zahid Hossain
- (Bangladesh) Abdul Baten Komol
- (Bangladesh) Mohammed Yusuf
- (Pakistan) Arif Mehmood
- (Pakistan) Rizwan Asif
- (Maldives) Ali Ashfaq
- (Maldives) Mohamed Umair
- (Sri Lanka) MA Kaiz
