= 2015 Federation Cup (Bangladesh) =

Tournament details
- Country: Bangladesh
- Date: 16 February – 5 March 2015
- Teams: 12

Final positions
- Champions: Sheikh Jamal Dhanmondi Club (3rd title)
- Runners-up: Muktijoddha Sangsad KC

Tournament statistics
- Matches played: 19
- Goals scored: 59 (3.11 per match)
- Top goal scorer: (Haiti) Wedson Anselme (6 Goals)

Awards
- Best player: (Bangladesh) Jamal Bhuyan

The 2015 Bangladesh Federation Cup is the 27th edition to be played. It was played between 16 February and 5 March 2015 (originally to start on 19 December 2014). 11 teams from the Bangladesh Premier League along with one invited team will take part in the season's curtain-raiser.

== Draw ==
The draw ceremony of the tournament were held at BFF house Motijheel, Dhaka on 12 February 2015. The twelve participants were divided into four groups. Top two teams from each group will enter the quarter-finals.

== Venue ==
Dhaka
Bangabandhu National Stadium
Capacity: 36,000
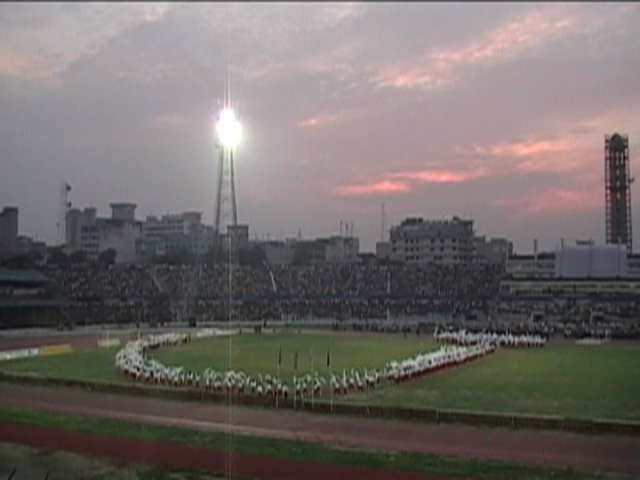

== Group stages ==
- All matches were played at Dhaka
- Times Listed are UTC+6:00.

Key to colours in group tables
| Group Winners and Runners advance to the Quarter-finals |

== Group A ==
| Pos | Team | Pld | W | D | L | GF | GA | GD | Pts | Qualification |
|---|---|---|---|---|---|---|---|---|---|---|
| 1 | Sheikh Jamal Dhanmondi Club | 2 | 2 | 0 | 0 | 11 | 1 | +10 | 6 | Advance to Quarter-finals |
| 2 | Feni Soccer Club | 2 | 1 | 0 | 1 | 4 | 3 | +1 | 3 | Advance to Quarter-finals |
| 3 | Team BJMC | 2 | 0 | 0 | 2 | 0 | 10 | −10 | 0 | |

Updated to match(es) played on 20 February 2015. Source: NowGoal

16 February 2015
15:00 BST

| Sheikh Jamal Dhanmondi Club | 4-1 | Feni Soccer Club |

Bangabandhu National Stadium, Dhaka

18 February 2015
19:00 BST

| Team BJMC | 0-3 | Feni Soccer Club |

Bangabandhu National Stadium, Dhaka

20 February 2015
15:00 BST

| Sheikh Jamal Dhanmondi Club | 7-0 | Team BJMC |

Bangabandhu National Stadium, Dhaka

== Group B ==
| Pos | Team | Pld | W | D | L | GF | GA | GD | Pts | Qualification |
|---|---|---|---|---|---|---|---|---|---|---|
| 1 | Sheikh Russel KC | 2 | 1 | 1 | 0 | 5 | 4 | +1 | 4 | Advance to Quarter-finals |
| 2 | Muktijoddha Sangsad KC | 2 | 1 | 1 | 0 | 4 | 2 | +2 | 4 | Advance to Quarter-finals |
| 3 | Uttar Baridhara SC | 2 | 0 | 0 | 2 | 0 | 9 | −9 | 0 | |

Updated to match(es) played on 22 February 2015. Source: NowGoal
17 February 2015
15:00 BST

| Muktijoddha Sangsad KC | 4-0 | Uttar Baridhara SC |

Bangabandhu National Stadium, Dhaka

19 February 2015
19:00 BST

| Sheikh Russel KC | 5-0 | Uttar Baridhara SC |

Bangabandhu National Stadium, Dhaka

22 February 2015
15:00 BST

| Muktijoddha Sangsad KC | 0-0 | Sheikh Russel KC |

Bangabandhu National Stadium, Dhaka

== Group C ==
| Pos | Team | Pld | W | D | L | GF | GA | GD | Pts | Qualification |
|---|---|---|---|---|---|---|---|---|---|---|
| 1 | Dhaka Abahani | 2 | 1 | 1 | 0 | 2 | 0 | +2 | 4 | Advance to Quarter-finals |
| 2 | Chittagong Abahani | 2 | 1 | 1 | 0 | 1 | 0 | +1 | 4 | Advance to Quarter-finals |
| 3 | Farashganj SC | 2 | 0 | 0 | 2 | 0 | 3 | −3 | 0 | |

Updated to match(es) played on 22 February 2015. Source: NowGoal
17 February 2015
15:00 BST

| Dhaka Abahani | 2-0 | Farashganj SC |

Bangabandhu National Stadium, Dhaka

19 February 2015
15:00 BST

| Chittagong Abahani | 1-0 | Farashganj SC |

Bangabandhu National Stadium, Dhaka

22 February 2015
19:00 BST

| Dhaka Abahani | 0-0 | Chittagong Abahani |

Bangabandhu National Stadium, Dhaka

== Group D ==
| Pos | Team | Pld | W | D | L | GF | GA | GD | Pts | Qualification |
|---|---|---|---|---|---|---|---|---|---|---|
| 1 | Dhaka Mohammedan | 2 | 1 | 1 | 0 | 3 | 1 | +2 | 4 | Advance to Quarter-finals |
| 2 | Brothers Union | 2 | 0 | 2 | 0 | 2 | 2 | 0 | 2 | Advance to Quarter-finals |
| 3 | Rahmatganj MFS | 2 | 0 | 1 | 1 | 2 | 3 | −1 | 1 | |

Updated to match(es) played on unknown. Source: NowGoal
16 February 2015
19:00 BST

| Dhaka Mohammedan | 2-1 | Rahmatganj MFS |

Bangabandhu National Stadium, Dhaka

18 February 2015
19:00 BST

| Brothers Union | 1-1 | Rahmatganj MFS |

Bangabandhu National Stadium, Dhaka

20 February 2015
19:00 BST

| Dhaka Mohammedan | 1-1 | Brothers Union |

Bangabandhu National Stadium, Dhaka

== Quarter-finals ==
24 February 2015
17:00 BST

| Sheikh Jamal Dhanmondi Club | 2-2 | Brothers Union |
Penalties
| | 5-4 |

Bangabandhu National Stadium, Dhaka

25 February 2015
17:00 BST

| Dhaka Mohammedan | 2-1 | Feni Soccer Club |

Bangabandhu National Stadium, Dhaka

26 February 2015
17:00 BST

| Sheikh Russel KC | 2-0 | Chittagong Abahani |

Bangabandhu National Stadium, Dhaka

27 February 2015
17:00 BST

| Dhaka Abahani | 0-1 (a.e.t.) | Muktijoddha Sangsad KC |

Bangabandhu National Stadium, Dhaka

== Semi-finals ==
1 March 2015
17:00 BST

| Sheikh Jamal Dhanmondi Club | 2-1 | Sheikh Russel KC |

Bangabandhu National Stadium, Dhaka

2 March 2015
17:00 BST

| Dhaka Mohammedan | 1-1 (a.e.t.) | Muktijoddha Sangsad KC |
Penalties
| | 3-4 |

Bangabandhu National Stadium, Dhaka

== Final ==
5 March 2015
19:00 BST

| Sheikh Jamal Dhanmondi Club | 6-4 (a.e.t.) | Muktijoddha Sangsad KC |

Bangabandhu National Stadium, Dhaka
