= Szabolcs Csorba =

Hungarian football player

Personal information
- Full name: Szabolcs Csorba
- Date of birth: 24 October 1991 (age 35)
- Place of birth: Debrecen, Hungary
- Height: 1.80 m (5 ft 11 in)
- Position: Forward

Team information
- Current team: Dhaka Abahani
- Number: 14

Youth career
- 2002–2006: Nyíregyháza Spartacus
- 2006–2010: MTK Budapest FC

Senior career*
Years	Team	Apps	(Gls)
2008–2009	MTK Budapest FC	0	(0)
2009–2015	Debreceni VSC	1	(0)
2015–	Dhaka Abahani	2	(2)
- * Club domestic league appearances and goals as of 4 August 2012

Szabolcs Csorba (born 24 October 1991) is a Hungarian football player currently playing for the Bangladeshi team Dhaka Abahani as a forward.

== Career statistics ==
Appearances and goals by club, season and competition
Club	Season	League			Cup		League Cup		Europe		Total	
Club	Season	Division	Apps	Goals	Apps	Goals	Apps	Goals	Apps	Goals	Apps	Goals
MTK Budapest FC	2008–09	Nemzeti Bajnokság I	0	0	0	0	1	0	0	0	1	0
Debreceni VSC	2009–10	Nemzeti Bajnokság I	0	0	0	0	1	0	0	0	1	0
Debreceni VSC	2010–11	Nemzeti Bajnokság I	0	0	1	0	1	0	0	0	2	0
Debreceni VSC	2011–12	Nemzeti Bajnokság I	0	0	2	1	2	0	0	0	4	1
Debreceni VSC	2012–13	Nemzeti Bajnokság I	1	0	0	0	0	0	0	0	1	0
Debreceni VSC	Total		1	0	3	1	4	0	0	0	8	1
Career total			1	0	3	1	5	0	0	0	9	1

Updated to games played as of 4 August 2012.
