= Wedson Anselme =

Haitian footballer (born 1986)

Personal information
- Full name: Suker Wedson Anselme
- Date of birth: 4 April 1986 (age 40)
- Place of birth: Haiti
- Positions: Midfielder; winger

Senior career*
Years	Team	Apps	(Gls)
2011–2013	Aigle Noir		
2013	San Cristóbal		
2013	Aigle Noir		
2013–2016	Sheikh Jamal DC	47	(52)
2017	East Bengal	17	(9)
2017–2018	Saif SC	6	(2)

International career
2012–	Haiti	1	(0)
- * Club domestic league appearances and goals as of 23 February 2018

Wedson Anselme (born 4 April 1986) is a Haitian professional footballer, played for Haiti national football team alongside clubs in India, Bangladesh and Dominican Republic.

== Club career ==
=== Early career ===
Wedson started his professional career with Aigle Noir of Haiti. He then represented San Cristobal FC in the Dominican Republic league. In 2011, he started his Asian adventure as he signed for Bangladesh Premier League side Sheikh Jamal Dhanmondi Club.

=== Sheikh Jamal Dhanmondi Club ===
The Haitian goal machine was lured to Bangladesh football in the 2013–14 season by his compatriot Sony Norde, who had made a name for himself in the previous season with Sheikh Russel KC. The two played for Sheikh Jamal in the 2013–14 season, winning the 2013–14 Premier League and the 2013 Federation Cup titles.he scored 26 goals in the process and became the top scorer of the season. But while Sony has since been lured by the riches of the Indian League, Wedson stayed back in Bangladesh, playing a key role in Sheikh Jamal's league and Federation cup titles in the following season as well as Sheikh Jamal's King's Cup triumph in Bhutan in 2014.

=== East Bengal ===
In November 2016 Wedson signed for I-League giant East Bengal FC. He made his debut for the club in their season opener match against Aizawl fc on 7 January 2017.He scored 8 goals from 15 matches in the 2016-17 I-League season which includes a sumptuous curler in an away fixture against Bengaluru fc.

=== Saif Sporting ===
After one season in India Anselme returned to Bangladesh Premier League. He has become the highest-paid footballer in Bangladesh's club history when the Haitian forward was signed by Bangladesh Premier League newcomers Saif Sporting Club from I-League outfit East Bengal for a record monthly wage. He replaced Alvi Fokou Fopa in the second phase of 2017–2018 season. He made his debut for the club in a "2–1" home win against Dhaka Abahani and scored a goal in the 34th minute. However at the end of the season Saif sporting released him in order to boost their squad ahead of the AFC Cup preliminary round.

== International career ==
Wesdon made his debut for Haiti in a non FIFA friendly match against French Guiana on 16 September 2012. Then he was also included in Haiti's 22 men squad for Copa América Centenario qualifying play-offs match on 9 January 2016 against Trinidad and Tobago and he made it up to the substitute list on the match day.

== Honours ==
Sheikh Jamal Dhanmondi

- Bangladesh Premier League: 2013–14, 2014–15
- Bangladesh Federation Cup: 2013, 2015
- Bhutan King's Cup: 2014
