= Walson Augustin =

Haitian footballer (born 1988)

Personal information
- Full name: Walson Augustin
- Date of birth: July 20, 1988 (age 38)
- Place of birth: Haiti
- Height: 1.67 m (5 ft 5 1/2 in)
- Positions: Midfielder; striker

Team information
- Current team: Brothers Union
- Number: 25

Senior career*
Years	Team	Apps	(Gls)
2005–2008	Don Bosco FC	12	(0)
2009–2011	Baltimore SC	12	(0)
2012–2013	Valencia FC	3	(0)
2013-16	Brothers Union		(36)
2016	Moca		
2017–18	Brothers Union	20	(7)

International career
2007	Haiti U20		
2007–2012	Haiti	3	(1)
- * Club domestic league appearances and goals as of 05:28, 19 May 2017 (UTC)

Walson Augustin (born 20 July 1988) is a Haitian footballer who plays for Brothers Union in the Bangladesh Premier league as a midfielder.

== Career ==
Augustin played club football for Don Bosco FC and Valencia FC in the Ligue Haïtienne before moving abroad. He led Valencia in scoring with eight league goals as the club won the 2012 championship, its first title.

Augustin has appeared for the Haiti national football team, scoring a goal against French Guiana in a friendly during preparation for 2012 Caribbean Cup qualification. He also played for Haiti at youth level, scoring twice in a victory that eliminated Guatemala from 2007 FIFA U-20 World Cup qualifying.

== Career statistics ==
=== International ===
Appearances and goals by national team and year
National team	Year	Apps	Goals
Haiti	2007	2	0
Haiti	2008	–	
Haiti	2009	–	
Haiti	2010	–	
Haiti	2011	–	
Haiti	2012	1	1
Total		3	1

Scores and results list Haiti's goal tally first, score column indicates score after each Augustin goal.

List of international goals scored by Walson Augustin
No.	Date	Venue	Opponent	Score	Result	Competition
1	16 September 2012	Stade Georges-Chaumet, Cayenne, French Guiana	French Guiana	2–0	2–1	Friendly
