= Football at the 2010 South Asian Games =

- Venue: Dhaka
- Dates: 29 January – 8 February 2010
- Nations: 8 (from 1 confederation)

Medalists
gold medal	Bangladesh (men); India (women)
silver medal	Afghanistan (men); Nepal (women)
bronze medal	Maldives (men); Bangladesh (women)

Football was one of the events at the 2010 South Asian Games. It was also the first to introduce Women's football to the Games, alongside Men's.

== Men ==
Accurate up to 2 June 2014.

Medal	Team	Note
Gold	Bangladesh	Second win after 1999
Silver	Afghanistan	First ever in Final in the South Asian Games
Bronze	Maldives	

== Women ==
Accurate up to 2 June 2014

Medal	Team	Note
Gold	India	
Silver	Nepal	
Bronze	Bangladesh	

== Medal table ==
Rank	Nation	Gold	Silver	Bronze	Total
1	Bangladesh (BAN)	1	0	1	2
2	India (IND)	1	0	0	1
3	Afghanistan (AFG)	0	1	0	1
3	Nepal (NEP)	0	1	0	1
5	Maldives (MDV)	0	0	1	1
Totals (5 entries)		2	2	2	6
