= Paul Emile Biyaga =

Cameroonian football striker

Personal information
- Date of birth: July 24, 1987 (age 39)
- Place of birth: Mbang, Cameroon
- Height: 1.83 m (6 ft 0 in)
- Position: Striker

Senior career*
| Years | Team | Apps | (Gls) |
| 2004–2007 | Tonnerre Yaoundé | - | (-) |
| 2007–2012 | ASO Chlef | 49 | (6) |
| 2012 | NA Hussein Dey | 9 | (0) |
| 2012– | Haras El-Hodood | - | (-) |
| 2014– | Sông Lam Nghệ An | 18 | (8) |
| 2015 | Sheikh Russel KC | 12 | (6) |
| 2016 | CLB Long An | 2 | (0) |
| 2018–2019 | Arambagh KS | 22 | (9) |
| 2019–2020 | Muktijoddha Sangsad | 4 | (1) |

International career^{‡}
| | Cameroon U-17 | 4 | (2) |
| | Cameroon U-20 | 6 | (3) |
- * Club domestic league appearances and goals as of December 25, 2019 ‡ National team caps and goals as of September 21, 2012

Paul Emile Biyaga (born 24 July 1987 in Mbang) is a Cameroonian professional footballer, last played for Muktijoddha Sangsad KC in Bangladesh Premier League.

== Honours ==
ASO Chlef

- Algerian Ligue Professionnelle 1: 2011
