= Brothers Union =

Association football club based in Dhaka

- Full name: Brothers Union Limited
- Nickname: The Oranges
- Founded: 1949; 77 years ago
- Ground: Bir Sreshtho Matiur Rahman Stadium
- Capacity: 10,000
- Convener: Ishraque Hossain
- Head coach: K.M. Zabid Hossain
- League: Bangladesh Football League
- 2025–26: Bangladesh Football League, 7th of 10
- Website: brothersunion.com
Home colours	Away colours

Departments of Brothers Union
Football (Men's)	Cricket (Men's)

Brothers Union (Note: Bengali: ব্রাদার্স ইউনিয়ন) is a professional football club based in Gopibagh, Dhaka, Bangladesh. It currently competes in the Bangladesh Football League, the top flight of Bangladeshi Football.

The club was founded in 1949, patroned by local Gopibagh businessmen. Nicknamed the Oranges, Brothers Union spent the late 70s and early 80s as one of the pioneers of Bangladeshi football, behind Abahani Limited Dhaka and Dhaka Mohammedan. Throughout their history, Brothers Union have built a reputation for spotting and developing young talent, especially during the club's legendary coach Abdul Gafur Baloch's tenure from 1972 to 1986.

The club earned promotions from the Dhaka Third Division Football League and Dhaka Second Division Football League in 1973 and 1974, respectively. They entered the First Division in 1975. However, they had to wait till the 2003–04 season to win their first league title. Their second league triumph came in the following season, in 2005. The club has also found success at continental level, jointly winning the 1981–82 edition of the Aga Khan Gold Cup, becoming the first and only local club to win the tournament since the Independence of Bangladesh.

Brothers Union were one of the founding members of the Bangladesh Football League in 2007. They remained in the professional league, until facing relegation at the end of the 2021–22 season. The club withdrew from the second-tier, the Championship League in the following season and eventually gained promotion back to the top-flight as champions of the 2022–23 Championship League.

== History ==
=== Foundation ===
The club was founded in 1949 and the regal business tycoon Kazi Ghiyasuddin Ahmed, better known as K. G. Ahmed served as the founder chairman, while the former Minister of Education of East Pakistan, the late Zahiruddin and eminent journalist A. B. M. Musa were the first president and general secretary of the club respectively. At the beginning it was a well-known cultural organization. However, during the 1971 Liberation war, Brothers Union shut down all club activities. In 1972, a few months after the war had reached its conclusion and resulted in Bangladesh's independence, Saifuddin Ahmed Manik, one of the club's founding members, had his younger brother Shahiduddin Ahmed Selim recruit veteran football coach Abdul Gafur Baloch, with the idea of re-entering divisional football Dhaka.

In 1972, Gafur Baloch started holding trails for Brothers Union Youth team, mainly consisting of high school students in Gopibag. Throughout the 70s Baloch's youth team would open a pathway for many future national team stars, including the club's midfield linchpin Hasanuzzaman Bablu and also their best ever player Mohammed Mohsin. In 1973, Mohsin got a chance to play for the main team, when Brothers resumed playing in the Dhaka Third Division League after the war. The teenage striker scored 39 goals, including a hat-trick and a double hat-trick leading Brothers to promotion as undefeated champions. The following year, he scored 22 goals in the Dhaka Second Division League, as Brothers secured consecutive promotions again as undefeated champions, booking their place in the 1975 First Division.

During the early years of its rebirth, the club suffered from a major financial crisis due to the war. Although Brothers resumed all football activities in 1973, the first residential camp of Brothers Union was held at the 48 Ramakrishna Mission Road, Gopibagh, while the club was still playing in the second division league, in 1974. The four-storey building belonged to Saifuddin Ahmed Manik, and Selim who was given the team's captaincy, persuaded his brother to let the players camp in the two flats on the ground floor without having to pay rent. A stable source of funding was eventually provided by Sadeque Hossain Khoka, a former mayor and minister of Dhaka, who served as the club's general secretary from 1972 to 1979.

=== The Emerging Giant ===
In 1975, Brothers entered the Dhaka First Division League, and in their inaugural league game the club defeated reigning champions Abahani Krira Chakra 1–0, with a goal from Titu. The victory earned Brothers huge admiration from both media and local supporters. During the first phase of the league the club only lost a single game (to Mohammedan SC), and soon became one of the big names in the league. The late 1970s saw the club's attacking duo of Mohammed Mohsin and Hasanuzzaman Bablu establish themselves as one of best in the league, while few of their unsung heroes were left-back Noman Nannu, midfielder Abdus Salam and striker Fazlu, who were all products of their youth team. In 1978 the club finished the season as runner-up behind Abahani. In 1979, Gafur Baloch introduced teenage winger Khandoker Wasim Iqbal to the Dhaka football scene, who scored the only goal in a 1–0 victory over Mohammedan SC in the league.

The year 1979, was a disappointing one for the club, suffering heavy defeats in the Aga Khan Gold Cup at the hands of BJIC and the Afghanistan XI. Brothers had to wait till 1980 to enjoy their first major trophy success as they shared the first edition of the Federation Cup title with Mohammedan SC, after the final ended 0–0. Later in the season, they defeated the Black and Whites 3–2 in a league encounter, thanks mainly to their talisman goal-scorer, Mohammed Mohsin. This was also Mohammedan's only defeat that year, as they went on to win the league title. The first half of the 1980s saw some new faces in the team, goalkeeper Atiqur Rahman, defenders Shafiqul Islam Manik, Mazidul Islam Moni and Azmat Ali were regulars in the team. While midfielder Mosaddeque and striker Mahmudul Haque Liton soon made their way into the Bangladesh national team. In 1981, Mohammed Mohsin enjoyed his best top-flight season, becoming top-scorer with 20 goals.

It was later in the 1981–82 Aga Khan Gold Cup where The Oranges achieved their biggest success, by becoming the first Bangladeshi team after independence to win the title. They cruised through the group-stage, to face the tournament favourites the Oman, surprisingly winning 3–1, with goals from Wasim Iqbal, Bablu and Fazlu. In the final against Bangkok Bank, the underdogs equalised through Monwar Babu with the game ending 1–1, the two teams were declared join champions. However, the title triumph was followed by a number of setbacks, as long-term serving defender Shahiduddin Ahmed Selim announced his retirement and coach Gafur Baloch, also ended his decade-long career with Brothers. In 1982, the club's marksmen Mohsin was severely injured by a cracker while playing an exhibition game. In 1984, the injured Mohsin became player cum coach, and guided the club into making Bangladesh domestic football history by defeating Dilkusha SC 15–0 in the league.

=== Title Collapse & New Generation ===
In 1985, coach Ali Imam who lead Abahani to consecutive league titles the previous year joined the Oranges. Imam was forced out by Abahani officials who appointed Kazi Salahuddin as their head coach. Notably, the Dhaka Metropolitan Football Committee had introduced the 3 point system in the league the previous season, and at that time the system was only used in England. With Imam determined for revenge, his side were unbeaten in the first phase of the league and were 2 points ahead of Mohammedan, and five points ahead of Abahani. However, in the Super league Brothers dropped points, and went into their final league match, against Abahani knowing that a victory would see them win the league. Even after taking 2–0 lead early on in the game, the Oranges lost the match 3–2, ending hopes for their maiden First Division title. The club's all-time top scorer Mohsin, who played limited games after his injury in 1982, retired at the end of the season.

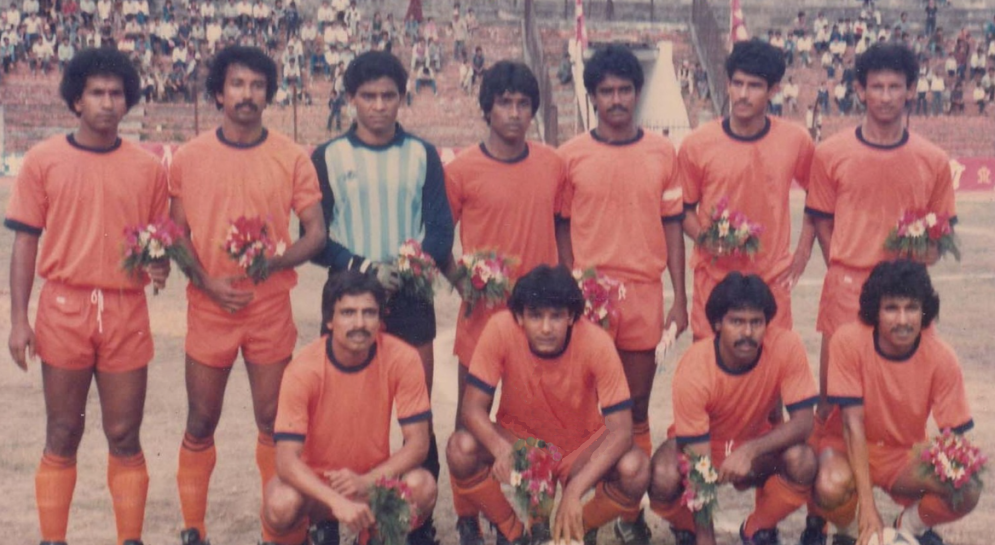
Brothers Union at the ANFA Cup in Kathmandu, Nepal, in 1987

In 1986, Gafur Baloch returned to Brothers and brought with him a young Monem Munna from Muktijoddha Sangsad KC, Munna guided an average Brothers team to a third place finish and left for Abahani the next year, while Baloch also announced his retirement at the end of the season. With Baloch's retirement, the club's famous youth team barely functioned, resulting in a decline of quality players coming out of the club. Brothers found their first solo success by winning the 1991 Federation Cup under former player turned coach Shahiduddin Ahmed Selim. During the tournament the Oranges captained by Nurul Haque Manik, kept a strong defence marshalled by Arif Hossain Moon. In the semi-final Brothers thrashed Fakirerpool Young Men's Club 3–0, setting up the final with Mohammedan who themselves had won a Dhaka Derby semi-final on penalties. The well anticipated final went to penalties after a goalless draw, where Brothers won 4–2.

Brothers made their AFC competition debut by participating in the 1992–93 Asian Club Championship qualifiers as the 1991 Federation Cup winners. They were eliminated in the second round after suffering an aggregate 0–2 defeat to Pakistani club Wohaib FC. In 1993, following the introduction of the Premier Division, a gentlemen's agreement was established between Brothers, Abahani, and Mohammedan to reduce player wages and refrain from recruiting players from one another, this opened an opportunity for Muktijoddha Sangsad to sign their top players on a higher wage, although it did not affect the other two teams as much as it did Brothers, as the club struggled to remain in the top-flight. In the 1995 Lifebuoy Premier League, the Oranges finished 8th, only five points clear of the drop. The club would not make the top three again until the turn of the century.

=== Champions of Bangladesh ===

2004 National Football League final starting line-up.

In 2004, the Brothers club authorities brought in Syed Nayeemuddin from India, as the club's coach cum technical advisor. The team manager Amer Khan also kept former Brothers midfielder Abu Noman Nannu, as the second head coach. The strong coaching staff was accompanied with the signings of regular national team players including Arman Mia, Alfaz Ahmed, Mohammed Sujan and Biplob Bhattacharjee. Nonetheless, The Oranges were eliminated in the first round of the season's curtain raiser, the Federation Cup. Amidst all the doubt that team would go on to create history by winning the club's inaugural Premier Division title, with Alfaz Ahmed and Arman Mia establishing one of the best attacking partnerships in the league. In the last game of the season against Muktijoddha Sangsad, winger Monwar Hossain scored the only goal to end the club's 29-year wait for the league title. They dedicated their top-tier league triumph to their former coach, the late Abdul Gafur Baloch.

The club followed their inaugural league triumph, by winning the 2004 National Football League. Arman Mia and Alfaz Ahmed's goals in the semi-final against Abahani Limited set up an underdog final between Brothers and Muktijoddha KSC, which The Oranges eventually won 2–4 on penalties, due to substitute goalkeeper Mohammed Ali's heroics. Towards the end of that year, Brothers won the Bordoloi Trophy in India, defeating Shillong XI 1–0 in the final, this was also the club's first international achievement. In 2005, veteran football coach Wazed Gazi took over from Nayeemuddin as the club's head coach. He led The Oranges to the Federation Cup title after 14 years, in front of a 10,000-strong crowd at the Bangabandhu National Stadium, which mainly consisted of Brothers fans. Moroccan striker Adil Okero scored the lone goal against Muktijodda Sangsad to clinch the title, while goalkeeper Atiqul Islam Tareq also produced a man of the match performance.

2005 Premier Division League Championship Playoff starting line-up.

In wake of their first National League triumph in 2004, Brothers took part in the 2005 AFC Cup. Striker Saiful Islam Khokon scored their inaugural goal in the competition, during a 1–1 draw with Turkmen club Nisa Aşgabat. However, Brothers were knocked out of the group-stages after failing to win any of their other two fixtures. After a disappointing continental campaign, Wazi Gazi's team bounced back by winning the Premier Division title for the consecutive time, while the club's Russian striker Edward Victor was also the leagues top scorer. With the league introducing a Championship Playoff match that season, Brothers faced Mohammedan in the title deciding game, and captain Mohammed Sujan scored the game's only goal from the penalty spot.

After winning the domestic double in 2005, The Oranges qualified for the 2006 AFC Cup. However, they disappointed in the tournament, and only claimed two points from six games. They opened the tournament with a 2–0 defeat to Bahrain champions Al-Muharraq SC, and in the next match tied 2–2 with India's Federation Cup winners Mahindra United, with goals from Zahid Hasan Ameli and Abul Hossain. In the next couple of games Brothers were thrashed by the Lebanese champions Al Ahed FC, 1–3 and 2–6 respectively. They ended their AFC Cup campaign with a goalless draw against Al-Muharraq and a 0–1 defeat at the hands of Mahindra United, to finish bottom of their group with a −9 goal difference. The holders were also knocked out of the semi-finals of the 2005–06 National Football League by Mohammedan. During the semi-finals, club secretary Sabbir Ahmed Arif assaulted assistant referee Shahidul Islam Lalu and referee Tayeb Shamsuzzaman. The incident occurred just before the final whistle, after Brothers midfielder Rezaul Karim Liton attacked the referee upon receiving a second yellow card and being sent off.

=== Steady decline ===
In preparation for the 2007 B.League, the inaugural edition of the country's first professional football league, Brothers secured contracts with veterans Amit Khan Shuvra, Jewel Rana, Masoud Rana, Monwar Hossain, and Rezaul Karim Liton. Nonetheless, the club lost many integral players from their consecutive league title triumphs to Dhaka Abahani, while coach Wazed Gazi also departed for Sheikh Russel KC. The club re-appointed Indian head coach Syed Nayeemuddin, who previously led them to their first National League and Premier Division titles in 2004. On 3 March 2007, Brothers defeated Chittagong Abahani 3–0 in their maiden professional league match at the Bangabandhu National Stadium. The club's Nigerian recruit Junior Obagbemiro scored a brace, while local striker Ashraful Quader Monju scored the third goal. The club ended the season in fifth position, with striker Junior Obagbemiro clinching the top-scorer's award with 16 league goals.

The following season, Brothers appointed club legend Khandoker Wasim Iqbal as head coach and managed to rope in former captain Mohammed Sujan on a contract worth Tk 10 lakh. Nonetheless, the club finished fourth that season, with 10 wins, 7 draws and 3 defeats from 20 league games. Nigerian striker, Henry Quae, was the club's top scorer in the league with six goals followed by 20-year old winger Zahid Hossain, who scored five league goals. Brothers also disappointed at the Federation Cup, as they failed to qualify from their group which included Third Division League club BKSP and Senior Division League club Victoria SC.

Brothers began the 2009 season by participating in the inaugural Bangladesh Super Cup. The club under Wasim Iqbal's second season as coach, crashed out of the semi-finals after suffering a 3–2 defeat to Dhaka Abahani. Eventually, the Oranges won the third-place decider 3–1 against Chittagong Mohammedan. Before the 2009–10 Bangladesh League began, Brothers, lost their star players, Zahid Hossain, Rezaul Karim Liton and Shakil Ahmed along with many other starters. Their new squad for the league was eventually selected by coach Wasim Iqbal through trials held at their Gopibagh training ground. The team consisting of rookies finished the league season in seventh position, and were only six points clear of relegation. The club were also knocked out from the group-stages of the Federation Cup.

From 2010 onward, the Oranges consistently failed to secure a top-three finish in the Football League. On August 5, 2012, club manager Amer Khan claimed on Ekattor TV that Brothers Union had been compelled to play a fixed match against eventual champions Abahani Limited Dhaka on 26 May during the 2011–12 season, though he later stated his comments were taken out of context following pressure from the Bangladesh Football Federation. In 2017, Brothers Union assembled a team worth Tk 1.4 crore and appointed Indian coach Subrata Bhattacharya Jr., but they only managed a seventh-place finish. The following season, under coach Syed Nayeemuddin, the team narrowly avoided relegation in the 2018–19 season, surviving by a single point.

=== Relegation, promotion & rejuvenation ===
On 17 August 2021, Brothers Union lost by 4–0 goals against Muktijoddha Sangsad KC which confirmed the club's relegation in the 2020–21 season. This ended their 45-year stint in the top-flight of Bangladeshi football and marked the first time in the club's history that they suffered relegation. During the season, Brothers Union, along with Arambagh KS, were suspected of engaging in match-fixing by the Asian Football Confederation. However, while Arambagh were penalized by the Bangladesh Football Federation (BFF), Brothers were declared innocent by the BFF. The following season, the club chose not to participate in the 2021–22 Bangladesh Championship League, with Amer Khan stating that the Oranges had failed to prepare adequately due to the COVID-19 pandemic.

The club confirmed their return to the top-flight, after winning the 2022–23 Bangladesh Championship League under local coach Zahidur Rahman Milon. The Oranges finished the season with sixteen victories out of twenty league games and were five points ahead of second-place, BFF Elite Academy. Following their return to the top flight, the club signed six players from the BFF Elite Academy during the BFF Players Auction 2023. However, due to a disagreement with the BFF over player salaries, the Oranges were unable to secure the players' services until the league's second leg. The club ultimately finished at the bottom of the table in the 2023–24 season and once again faced relegation. However, following the Non-cooperation movement in August 2024, the BFF decided against relegating the club due to the financial difficulties faced by the majority of top-flight teams at the time.

Following the fall of the Awami League on 5 August 2024, Bangladesh Nationalist Party member Ishraque Hossain, son of Sadeque Hossain Khoka, formed a 22-member convening committee, with himself serving as the convener and Sabbir Hossain as the member secretary. Following this takeover, the club roped in twenty eight new players, including Bangladesh national team captain, Jamal Bhuyan.

== Facilities ==
=== Training ground ===
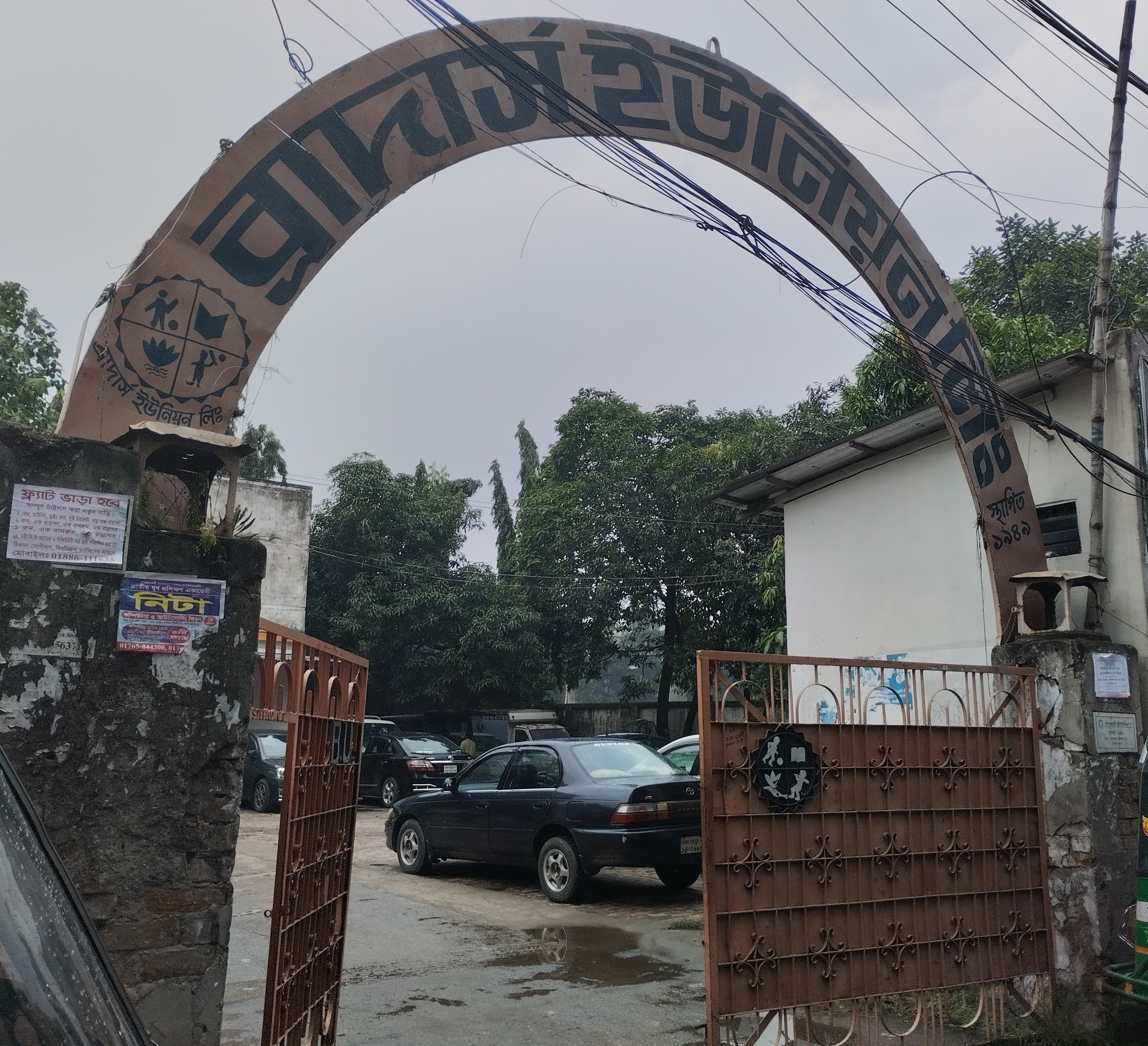
Headquarter of Brothers Union Limited

The Brothers Union field in Gopibagh, has been an integral part to their success, as they are one of the few clubs in the country to have a training ground of their own. In 1977, when the field was owned by Bangladesh Bank, some of the club's players were jailed for taking possession of the ground. In order to gain the Gopibagh field's ownership, the club's general secretary, Sadeque Hossain Khoka had to bring the country's president Lt. General Ziaur Rahman to the field. The president then stood on the field and announced (lit. '"whatever the name is, this will be the brothers' field, not an establishment's"'). Although Bangladesh Bank, later tried hard to reclaim the Gopibagh field's ownership, they were unsuccessful due to the president's decision. It is also the largest practice ground used by a professional football club in Dhaka. In May 2023, Bangladesh Bank clashed again with Brothers over the possession of the ground, as the club prevented the bank from constructing walkways around the field, stating that it would increase the risk of injuries for players. In September 2024, Sabbir Ahmed Arif, member secretary of the club's convening committee elected on 17 August 2024, following the non-cooperation movement, assured that the club had desires of renovating the ground with state-of-the-art facilities for both football and cricket.

=== Youth team ===
The Gopibagh-based, Little Friends Club and Bangladesh Boys Club, are regarded as the second-string teams of Brothers Union, with players often being nurtured there before making their move to the Oranges.

== Crest and colours ==
Old club crest used from 1949–2024.

== Current squad ==
As of 3 September 2026

Note: Flags indicate national team as defined under FIFA eligibility rules; some limited exceptions apply. Players may hold more than one non-FIFA nationality.

No.	Pos.	Nation	Player
2	DF	BAN	Md Hasebul Hasan Santo
3	DF	BAN	Md Sagor Sarkar
4	DF	BAN	Nabil Khandakar
5	DF	BRA	Jonathan Santana
6	MF	BAN	Jamal Bhuyan (captain)
7	MF	PAK	Ali Uzair
10	MF	BRA	Thiago Dunha
11	FW	PAK	Syed Ali Raza
13	MF	BAN	Md Sohel Rana
15	MF	BAN	Ashikur Rahman
16	DF	NEP	Sakal Regmi
17	MF	BAN	Md Monirul Islam
18	DF	BAN	Saddam Hossain
20	FW	GHA	Evanonye Kossi Adetu
22	GK	BAN	Hasnat Abdullah
25	FW	BAN	Md Al Mirad
27	FW	BAN	Md Abdul Halim
29	DF	BAN	Md Habibur Rahman

No.	Pos.	Nation	Player
30	GK	BAN	Md Tasin Saheb
32	FW	BAN	Md Sifat Khan
35	GK	BAN	Md Emon
39	MF	BAN	Md Ariful Haque Shemanto
40	FW	BAN	Iftesam Rahman Jidan
40	DF	BAN	Rakib Hossen
43	FW	BAN	Aswad Bin Walid Khan
44	DF	BAN	Md Golam Rabby
52	DF	BAN	Md Fahim Morshed
53	GK	BAN	Md Sahajun Hossain Shaju
54	MF	BAN	Aung Cho Tun
55	GK	BAN	Md Razib
56	DF	BAN	Md Emon Khan
57	DF	ENG	William Olamipo Oduwa
66	FW	BAN	Molt agim Alam Hemel
68	DF	BAN	Md Sadik Ahmed
73	DF	BAN	Tutul Hossain Badsha

== Current technical staff ==
=== Coaching staff ===
As of 20 November 2026

Position	Name
Head coach	(The Gambia) Omar Sisse
Assistant coach	(Bangladesh) K.M. Zabid Hossain
Team manager	(Bangladesh) A.Zaman Eazaz
Trainer	(Uzbekistan) Otabek Valizhonov

=== Board of directors ===
As of 29 November 2024

Position	Name
Convener	(Bangladesh) Ishraque Hossain
Member Secretary	(Bangladesh) Sabbir Ahmed Arif
Technical Director	(Bangladesh) Khandoker Wasim Iqbal

== Coaching records ==
=== Coaching history ===
Interim or caretaker coaches are listed in italics.

- (Pakistan) Gafur Baloch (1972–83)
- (Bangladesh) Mohammed Mohsin (1984)
- (Bangladesh) Ali Imam (1985)
- (Pakistan) Gafur Baloch (1986)
- (Bangladesh) Enayetur Rahman (1987)
- (Bangladesh) Kazi Salahuddin (1988–89)
- (Bangladesh) Shahiduddin Ahmed Selim (1991–00)
- (Bangladesh) S M Abu Noman Nannu (2001–04)
- (India) Syed Nayeemuddin (2003–04)
- (Bangladesh) Wazed Gazi (2005–06)
- (Bangladesh) Khandoker Wasim Iqbal (2007–11)
- (India) Syed Nayeemuddin (2011–12)
- (Nigeria) Ladi Babalola (2012–13)
- (Bangladesh) Mohidur Rahman Miraz (2013)
- (India) Syed Nayeemuddin (2013–15)
- (Nepal) Bal Gopal Maharjan (2016)
- (India) Syed Nayeemuddin (2016)
- (India) Subrata Bhattacharya Jr. (2017)
- (Italy) Giovanni Scanu (2017)
- (Cyprus) Nicolas Vitorović (2017–18)
- (Peru) Gregory Farfan (2018)
- (India) Syed Nayeemuddin (2018–19)
- (Bangladesh) Mohidur Rahman Miraz (2019)
- (Iran) (Germany) Reza Parkas (2019–20)
- (Bangladesh) Abdul Qaium Sentu (2020–21)
- (Iran) (Germany) Reza Parkas (2021)
- (Bangladesh) Sheikh Zahidur Rahman Milon (2022–23)
- (Bangladesh) Faisal Mahmud (2023)
- (The Gambia) Omar Sisse (2024)
- (Bangladesh) Ali Asgar Nasir (2024)
- (Bangladesh) Azmol Hossain Biddyut (2024)
- (The Gambia) Omar Sisse (2024–25)
- (Bangladesh) K.M. Zabid Hossain (2025–26)
- (The Gambia) Omar Sisse (2026–)

=== Head coach's record ===
As of 23 May 2026

Coach	From	To	P	W	D	L	GS	GA	%W
(Nepal) Bal Gopal Maharjan	1 June 2016	20 August 2016	9	2	5	2	11	12	22.22
(India) Syed Nayeemuddin	3 September 2016	31 December 2016	16	7	4	5	30	25	43.75
(India) Subrata Bhattacharya Jr.	11 May 2017	10 June 2017	3	0	2	1	2	3	0.00
(Italy) Giovanni Scanu	12 July 2017	5 August 2017	2	0	2	0	0	0	0.00
(Cyprus) Nicolas Vitorović	20 August 2017	27 January 2018	21	6	5	10	21	31	28.57
(Peru) Gregory Farfan	October 2018	November 2018	2	0	0	2	2	8	0.00
(India) Syed Nayeemuddin	15 November 2018	30 April 2019	16	3	4	9	11	26	18.75
(Bangladesh) Mohidur Rahman Miraz	1 May 2019	22 December 2019	14	3	4	7	21	32	21.43
(Iran) (Germany) Reza Parkas	28 December 2019	27 December 2020	5	0	4	1	6	7	0.00
(Bangladesh) Abdul Qaium Sentu	28 December 2020	16 February 2021	9	0	1	8	4	19	0.00
(Iran) (Germany) Reza Parkas	10 March 2021	20 September 2021	17	1	3	13	7	35	5.88
(Bangladesh) Sheikh Zahidur Rahman Milon	2 November 2022	20 April 2023	20	16	3	1	30	6	80.00
(Bangladesh) Faisal Mahmud (caretaker)	20 October 2023	30 December 2023	4	0	1	3	4	13	0.00
(The Gambia) Omar Sisse	10 January 2024	1 February 2024	5	0	1	4	4	18	0.00
(Bangladesh) Ali Asgar Nasir (interim)	1 February 2024	8 February 2024	1	0	1	0	2	2	0.00
(Bangladesh) Azmol Hossain Biddyut	9 February 2024	30 May 2024	14	1	1	12	12	54	7.14
(The Gambia) Omar Sisse	5 June 2024	29 May 2025	23	9	7	7	38	21	39.13
(Bangladesh) K.M. Zabid Hossain	26 September 2025	30 June 2026	24	6	6	12	24	36	25.00
(The Gambia) Omar Sisse	1 July 2026	Present	0	0	0	0	0	0	—

== Season by season record ==
Record as Professional Football League member
Season	Division	League								Federation Cup	Independence Cup	Asian club competition	Top league scorer(s)	
Season	Division	P	W	D	L	GF	GA	Pts	Position	Federation Cup	Independence Cup	Asian club competition	Player	Goals
2007	B.League	20	8	5	7	32	19	29	5th	—	—	—	(Nigeria) Junior Obagbemiro	16
2008/09	B.League	20	10	7	3	34	23	37	4th	Group-stage	—	—	(Nigeria) Henry Quae	6
2009/10	B.League	24	5	11	8	20	26	26	7th	Group-stage	—	—	(Ghana) Enock Bentil	10
2010	B.League	22	8	6	8	31	30	30	5th	Semi-finals	Quarter-finals	—	(Nigeria) Kingsley Chigozie	8
2011/12	BPL	20	6	6	8	25	35	24	7th	Group-stage	—	—	(Nigeria) Kingsley Chigozie	9
2012/13	BPL	16	2	5	9	14	23	11	8th	Quarter-finals	Group-stage	—	(Nigeria) Kingsley Chigozie	6
2013/14	BPL	27	10	8	9	35	33	38	5th	Quarter-finals	Semi-finals	—	(Haiti) Walson Augustin	8
2014/15	BPL	20	10	5	5	29	21	35	5th	Quarter-finals	—	—	(Haiti) Walson Augustin	15
2015/16	BPL	22	7	9	6	37	34	30	4th	Quarter-finals	Group-stage	—	(Haiti) Walson Augustin	13
2017/18	BPL	22	5	7	10	20	30	22	7th	Quarter-finals	Quarter-finals	—	(Democratic Republic of the Congo) Siyo Zunapio	10
2018/19	BPL	24	5	6	13	28	49	21	11th	Group-stage	Semi-finals	—	(Bangladesh) Mannaf Rabby	8
2019/20	BPL	Abandoned								Group-stage	—	—	(Uzbekistan) Otabek Valizhonov	3
2020/21	BPL	24	1	4	19	16	51	7	13th	Group-stage	—	—	(Bangladesh) Faisal Mahmud (Democratic Republic of the Congo) Siyo Zunapio	3
2021/22	BCL	Did not participate								—	—	—	—	
2022/23	BCL	20	16	3	1	30	7	51	Champions	—	—	—	(Bangladesh) Md Sohag Hossain	6

Champions	Runners-up	Third place	Promoted	Relegated

== Performance in AFC competitions ==
- Asian Club Championship: 1 appearance

1992–93: First Round

- AFC Cup: 2 appearances

2005: Group Stage
2006: Group Stage

=== Results ===
Competition	Season	Club	Score	Opponent
Asian Club Championship	1992–93	(Bangladesh) Brothers Union	0–0	(Pakistan) Wohaib
Asian Club Championship	1992–93	(Bangladesh) Brothers Union	0–2	(Pakistan) Wohaib
AFC Cup	2005	(Bangladesh) Brothers Union	1–1	(Turkmenistan) Nisa Aşgabat
AFC Cup	2005	(Bangladesh) Brothers Union	1–4	(Lebanon) Al-Nejmeh Beirut
AFC Cup	2005	(Bangladesh) Brothers Union	0–0	(Turkmenistan) Nisa Aşgabat
AFC Cup	2005	(Bangladesh) Brothers Union	0–2	(Lebanon) Al-Nejmeh Beirut
AFC Cup	2006	(Bangladesh) Brothers Union	0–2	(Bahrain) Al-Muharraq
AFC Cup	2006	(Bangladesh) Brothers Union	2–2	(India) Mahindra United
AFC Cup	2006	(Bangladesh) Brothers Union	1–3	(Lebanon) Al Ahed
AFC Cup	2006	(Bangladesh) Brothers Union	2–6	(Lebanon) Al Ahed
AFC Cup	2006	(Bangladesh) Brothers Union	0–0	(Bahrain) Al-Muharraq
AFC Cup	2006	(Bangladesh) Brothers Union	0–1	(India) Mahindra United

== Honours ==
=== League ===
- Bangladesh Championship League
  - Champions (1): 2022–23
- Dhaka Premier Division League
  - Champions (2): 2003–04, 2005
- National League
  - Champions (1): 2004
- Dhaka Second Division League
  - Champions (1): 1974
- Dhaka Third Division League
  - Champions (1): 1973

=== Cup ===
- Federation Cup
  - Champions (2): 1980 (shared), 1991, 2005
- DMFA Cup
  - Champions (1): 1984 (shared)
- Aga Khan Gold Cup (Note: The competition is widely regarded as the predecessor of AFC Champions League (held for the first time in 1967), since it was the first organized international competition that involved club teams around Asia, organized by the football authorities of East Pakistan, in collaboration with Asian Football Confederation (AFC).)
  - Champions (1): 1981–82 (shared)

=== Invitational ===
- Bordoloi Trophy
  - Champions (1): 2004

== Notable players ==
- The players below had senior international cap(s) for their respective countries. Players whose name is listed, represented their countries before or after playing for Brothers Union.

Asia

- (Nepal) Bal Gopal Maharjan (1991–93; 2000–01)
- (Nepal) Hari Khadka (2000–01)
- (Nepal) Basanta Thapa (2000–01)
- (Iraq) Muayad Khalid (2018–19)
- (Nepal) Sanish Shrestha (2025–26)
- (Nepal) Arik Bista (2025–26)
- (Nepal) Anjan Bista (2025–26)
- (Nepal) Yogesh Gurung (2025–26)
- (Pakistan) Abdullah Shah (2026)
- (Pakistan) Shayak Dost (2026)
- (Pakistan) Muhammad Umar Hayat (2026)
- (Pakistan) Alamgir Ghazi (2026)
- (Pakistan) Hayyaan Khattak (2026)
- (Pakistan) Ali Uzair (2026–present)
- (Pakistan) Syed Ali Raza (2026–present)

Africa

- (Sudan) (South Sudan) James Moga (2019)
- (Nigeria) Mfon Udoh (2025)
