= Federation Cup (Bangladesh) =

Annual association football club tournament in Bangladesh

- Organiser(s): BFF
- Founded: 1980; 46 years ago
- Region: Bangladesh
- Teams: 12; 10 (2023–24)
- Qualifier for: Bangladesh Challenge Cup
- Related competitions: Bangladesh Football League
- Current champions: Bashundhara Kings (5th titles)
- Most championships: Abahani Limited Dhaka (12th titles)
- Broadcaster: T Sports
- Website: bff.com.bd/federation cup
- 2026–27

The Federation Cup, also known as the Bangladesh Federation Cup, is Bangladesh's premier cup competition in men's association football. The competition started in 1980 and is run by the Bangladesh Football Federation which is responsible for all types of competitive matches in the country. The teams from the country's premier league and other permitted clubs compete in the tournament while occasionally Indian sides were invited in the past. Usually games are played in the neutral venues.

== Competition format ==
=== Initial ===
Prior to the 2024–25 season, the format involved a total of 13 teams participate in the final round. The groups are drawn out by the Bangladesh Football Federation before the tournament. Teams are split into 4 groups and the two top teams from each group qualify for the knockout rounds. A group winner deciding match is held if two teams are on equal on points and Goal difference. Following the group-stages fixtures ending in a tie after extra time will be decided by a penalty shoot-out.

=== Current ===
From the 2024–25 season onwards, ten clubs participate, divided into two groups. The top two from each group qualify for the final rounds.

== Results ==
Year	Winners	Runners-up	Score	Notes and References
1980	Jointly: Mohammedan SC and Brothers Union		0–0	
1981	Mohammedan SC	Abahani Krira Chakra	2–0	
1982	Jointly: Abahani Krira Chakra and Mohammedan SC		0–0	
1983	Mohammedan SC	Abahani Krira Chakra	2–0	
1984	Jointly: Mohammedan SC and Abahani Krira Chakra		—	Match abandoned due to riots, with the score at 0–0.
1985	Abahani Krira Chakra	Brothers Union	1–0	
1986	Abahani Krira Chakra	Brothers Union	2–1	
1987	Mohammedan SC	Dhaka Wanderers	1–0	
1988	Dhaka Abahani	Mohammedan SC	1–0	
1989	Mohammedan SC	Dhaka Abahani	2–1 (a.e.t.)	
1990	not held			
1991	Brothers Union	Mohammedan SC	0–0 (a.e.t.) (4–2 (p))	
1992	not held			
1993	not held			
1994	Muktijoddha Sangsad	Dhaka Abahani	3–2	
1995	Mohammedan SC	Dhaka Abahani	0–0 (a.e.t.) (6–5 (p))	
1996	not held			
1997	Dhaka Abahani	Arambagh KS	2–1	
1998	not held			
1999	Dhaka Abahani	Muktijoddha Sangsad	0–0 (a.e.t.) (5–3 (p))	
2000	Dhaka Abahani	Mohammedan SC	2–1	
2001	Muktijoddha Sangsad	Arambagh KS	3–0	
2002	Mohammedan SC	Muktijoddha Sangsad	2–0	
2003	Muktijoddha Sangsad	Mohammedan SC	2–1 (a.e.t.)	
2004	not held			
2005	Brothers Union	Muktijoddha Sangsad	1–0	
2006	not held			
2007	not held			
Professional league era
2008	Mohammedan SC	Dhaka Abahani	1–1 (a.e.t.) (3–2 (p))	
2009	Mohammedan SC	Dhaka Abahani	0–0 (a.e.t.) (4–1 (p))	
2010	Dhaka Abahani	Sheikh Jamal DC	5–3 (a.e.t.)	
2011–12	Sheikh Jamal DC	Team BJMC	3–1	
2012	Sheikh Russel KC	Sheikh Jamal DC	2–1 (a.e.t.)	
2013	Sheikh Jamal DC	Muktijoddha Sangsad	1–0	
2014	not held			
2015	Sheikh Jamal DC	Muktijoddha Sangsad	6–4 (a.e.t.)	
2016	Dhaka Abahani	Arambagh KS	1–0	
2017	Dhaka Abahani	Chittagong Abahani	3–1	
2018	Dhaka Abahani	Bashundhara Kings	3–1	
2019–20	Bashundhara Kings	Rahmatganj MFS	2–1	
2020–21	Bashundhara Kings	Saif SC	1–0	
2021–22	Dhaka Abahani	Rahmatganj MFS	2–1	
2022–23	Mohammedan SC	Dhaka Abahani	4–4 (a.e.t.) (4–2 (p))	
2023–24	Bashundhara Kings	Mohammedan SC	2–1	
2024–25	Bashundhara Kings	Dhaka Abahani	1–1 (a.e.t.) (5–3 (p))	
2025–26	Bashundhara Kings	Mohammedan SC	3–2	

== Statistics by club ==
Team	Winner	Runners-up	Years won	Years runners-up
Dhaka Abahani	12	9	1982*, 1985, 1986, 1988, 1997, 1999, 2000, 2010, 2016, 2017, 2018, 2021–22	1981, 1983, 1989, 1994, 1995, 2008, 2009, 2022–23, 2024–25
Mohammedan SC	11	6	1980*, 1981, 1982*, 1983, 1987, 1989, 1995, 2002, 2008, 2009, 2022–23	1988, 1991, 2000, 2003, 2023–24, 2025-26
Bashundhara Kings	5	1	2019–20, 2020–21, 2023–24, 2024–25, 2025–26	2018
Muktijoddha Sangsad	3	5	1994, 2001, 2003	1999, 2002, 2005, 2013, 2015
Brothers Union	3	2	1980*, 1991, 2005	1985, 1986
Dhanmondi Club	3	2	2011–12, 2013, 2015	2010, 2012
Sheikh Russel KC	1	0	2012	
Arambagh Krira Sangha	0	3		1997, 2001, 2016
Rahmatganj MFS	0	2		2019–20, 2021–22
Dhaka Wanderers	0	1		1987
Team BJMC	0	1		2011–12
Chittagong Abahani	0	1		2017
Saif SC	0	1		2020–21

== Top goalscorers by edition ==
As of 20 May 2026

Years	Players	Clubs	Goals
1987	(Bangladesh) Rizvi Rumi (Bangladesh) Rumman Sabbir	BRTC SC; Mohammedan SC	4
2001	(Bangladesh) Mominur Rahman Momin	Prantik Krira Chakra	7
2009	(Nigeria) Alamu Bukola Olalekan	Mohammedan SC	8
2010	(South Sudan) James Moga	Muktijoddha Sangsad	7
2011–12	(Nigeria) Assogba Allen (Nigeria) Abdul Rasheed Ajagun (Cameroon) Ernest Emako-Siankam (Nigeria) Lucky Divine	Sheikh Jamal DC; Team BJMC; Sheikh Russel KC; Rahmatganj MFS	4
2012	(Bangladesh) Jahid Hasan Ameli	Sheikh Russel KC	7
2013	(Haiti) Sony Norde	Sheikh Jamal DC	7
2015	(Haiti) Wedson Anselme	Sheikh Jamal DC	6
2016	(Nigeria) Kester Akon	Arambagh KS	4
2017	(Nigeria) Emeka Darlington	Dhaka Abahani	3
2018	(Nigeria) Sunday Chizoba	Dhaka Abahani	6
2019–20	(Puerto Rico) Sidney Rivera	Bangladesh Police	4
2020–21	(Argentina) Raúl Becerra (Nigeria) Kenneth Ikechukwu	Bashundhara Kings; Saif Sporting Club	5
2021–22	(Brazil) Dorielton Gomes (Nigeria) Philip Adjah	Dhaka Abahani; Rahmatganj MFS	4
2022–23	(Mali) Souleymane Diabate	Mohammedan SC	8
2023–24	(Brazil) Washington Brandão	Dhaka Abahani	5
2024–25	(Bangladesh) Topu Barman (The Gambia) Mustapha Drammeh (Bangladesh) Sazzad Hossain (Bangladesh) Arif Hossain (Bangladesh) Nabib Newaj Jibon (Ghana) Samuel Boateng (Bangladesh) Mohammad Ibrahim	Bashundhara Kings; Brothers Union; Brothers Union; Mohammedan SC; Rahmatganj MFS; Rahmatganj MFS; Dhaka Abahani	3
2026–26	(Brazil) Dorielton Gomes	Bashundhara Kings	12

== Sponsorship ==
The tournament is currently sponsored by Bashundhara Group. Below is a list of sponsors:

Period	Sponsor
1980–1987	No main sponsor
1988	Pepsi
1989	Coca-Cola
1991–1994	No main sponsor
1995	Beximco
1997	No main sponsor
1999	Pedrolo Pump
2000	No main sponsor
2001	Nitol Group
2002	Muktijoddha Sangsad
2003–2005	Kohinoor Chemical
2008–2009	Citycell
2010–2012	Grameenphone
2013–2018	Walton
2019–20	TVS Motor Company
2020–2021	Walton
2021–	Bashundhara Group

== See also ==
- Bangladesh Football Federation
- Bangladesh Challenge Cup
- Bangladesh Football League
- Independence Cup
- Bangladesh Championship League
- Super Cup
- List of Bangladeshi football champions
- Football in Bangladesh
