= 2018–19 Bangladesh Premier League (football) =

11th professional season of the top-flight football league in Bangladesh

Bangladesh Premier League
- Season: 2018–19
- Dates: 18 January 2019 – 3 August 2019
- Champions: Bashundhara Kings (1st title)
- Relegated: Team BJMC; NoFeL Sporting Club
- AFC Cup: Bashundhara Kings; Dhaka Abahani
- Matches: 156
- Goals: 439 (2.81 per match)
- Best player: (Costa Rica) Daniel Colindres
- Top goalscorer: 22 goals (Nigeria) Raphael Odovin Onwrebe
- Best goalkeeper: (Bangladesh) Ashraful Islam Rana
- Biggest home win: Bashundhara Kings 5–0 Brothers Union (16 July 2019)
- Biggest away win: Muktijoddha Sangsad KC 1–6 Sheikh Russel KC (24 July 2019)
- Highest scoring: Arambagh KS 6–3 Rahmatganj MFS (20 July 2019)
- Longest winning run: 14 matches Bashundhara Kings
- Longest unbeaten run: 20 matches Bashundhara Kings
- Longest winless run: 15 matches Team BJMC
- Longest losing run: 7 matches Brothers Union

The 2018–19 Bangladesh Premier League (also known as TVS Bangladesh Premier League for sponsorship reason) was the 11th season of the Bangladesh Premier League since its establishment in 2007. A total of 13 football clubs competed in the league. Dhaka Abahani were the defending champions. Bashundhara Kings and NoFeL Sporting Club were entered as the promoted teams from the 2017 Bangladesh Championship League. The league was delayed and was rescheduled to start from 18 January 2019. Six venues hosted the matches.

Debutant Bashundhara Kings clinched their first title.

== Rule changes ==
Bangladesh became the latest member association to adopt AFC's 3+1 rule which will allow clubs to recruit one player of Asian origin in addition to their regular quota of three foreigners.

The Bangladesh Football Federation executive committee decided to embrace the new AFC rule which encourages the mobility of talented Asian players and provides a fillip to the regional game.

== Teams ==
Locations of the 2018–19 Bangladesh Premier League teams

Twelve teams were competed In previous season. This season, thirteen teams competed in the league, – the top eleven teams from the previous season and the two teams promoted from the Championship. The promoted teams were Bashundhara Kings and NoFeL Sporting Club (both the teams are playing BPL for the first time). They replaced Farashganj SC.

=== Stadiums and locations ===
FIFA and the AFC directed the BFF that matches of the professional league would have to organize at least five different venues.

Primarily, teams have applied for eight venues to the BFF. Abahani Limited, Sheikh Jamal Dhanmondi Club and Mohammedan Sporting Club, choose Bangabandhu National Stadium as their home venue. Arambagh and Saif Sporting Club applied for Mymensingh Stadium, Rahmatganj and Brothers for Birsreshtha Kamlapur Stadium, or Goplaganj Stadium, Sheikh Russel, Muktijoddha, newcomers Bashundhara Kings applied for Nilphamari Stadium, NOFEL for Noakhali, or MA Aziz Stadium in Chittagong, Team BJMC and Chittagong Abahani wanted Rajshahi Stadium as their home venue. After inspecting the facilities of these applied venues, BFF has sanctioned the following six stadiums for clubs:

Team	Location	Stadium	Capacity
Arambagh KS	Mymensingh	Rafiq Uddin Bhuiyan Stadium	12,000
Bashundhara Kings	Nilphamari	Sheikh Kamal Stadium	20,000
Brothers Union	Dhaka	Bangabandhu National Stadium	36,000
Chittagong Abahani Ltd.	Dhaka	Bangabandhu National Stadium	36,000
Dhaka Abahani Ltd.	Dhaka	Bangabandhu National Stadium	36,000
Dhaka Mohammedan SC Ltd.	Dhaka	Bangabandhu National Stadium	36,000
Lt. Sheikh Jamal Dhanmondi Club Ltd.	Dhaka	Bangabandhu National Stadium	36,000
Muktijoddha Sangsad KC	Gopalganj	Sheikh Fazlul Haque Mani Stadium	5,000
NoFeL Sporting Club	Noakhali	Shaheed Bulu Stadium	10,000
Rahmatganj MFS	Dhaka	Bangabandhu National Stadium	36,000
Saif Sporting Club	Mymensingh	Rafiq Uddin Bhuiyan Stadium	12,000
Sheikh Russel KC	Sylhet	Sylhet District Stadium	25,000
Team BJMC	Noakhali	Shaheed Bulu Stadium	10,000

=== Personnel and sponsoring ===
Team	Head coach	Captain	Shirt sponsor	Kit manufacturer
Arambagh KS	(Bangladesh) Maruful Haque	(Bangladesh) Rabiul Hasan	–	
Bashundhara Kings	(Spain) Óscar Bruzón	(Costa Rica) Daniel Colindres	Bashundhara Group	
Brothers Union	(Bangladesh) Mohidur Rahman	(Bangladesh) Emrul Hasan	Biswas Builders Limited & NovoAir	
Chittagong Abahani Limited	(Bangladesh) Zulfiker Mahmud Mintu	(Bangladesh) Monaem Khan Raju	Saif Power Battery	
Dhaka Abahani Limited	(Portugal) Mário Lemos	(Bangladesh) Shahidul Alam Sohel	–	FBT
Dhaka Mohammedan SC Limited	(England) Sean Lane	(Bangladesh) Jahid Hasan Ameli	K–Sports	Prime Sports
Lt.Sheikh Jamal Dhanmondi Club Limited	(Bangladesh) Shafiqul Islam Manik	(The Gambia) Solomon King Kanform	A4 Bashundhara Paper	
Muktijoddha Sangsad KC	(Bangladesh) Abdul Qaium Sentu	(Bangladesh) Anik Ahmed	–	
NoFeL Sporting Club	(Bangladesh) Kamal Babu	(Bangladesh) Monsur Alam	Saif Power Battery	
Rahmatganj MFS	(Bangladesh) Syed Golam Jilani	(Nigeria) Monday Osagie	Tiger Cement	
Saif Sporting Club	(Northern Ireland) Johnny McKinstry	(Bangladesh) Jamal Bhuyan	Saif Power Battery	
Sheikh Russel KC	(Bangladesh) Saiful Bari Titu	(Bangladesh) Ashraful Islam Rana	Bashundhara Cement	
Team BJMC	(Bangladesh) Jahidul Islam Milon	(Nigeria) Samson Iliasu	–	

=== Coaching changes ===
Team	Outgoing coach	Manner of departure	Date of vacancy	Week	Table	Incoming coach	Date of appointment
Dhaka Mohammedan	(Bangladesh) Ali Asgar Nasir	Resigned	16 February 2019	6	11	(England) Sean Lane	4 April 2019
Sheikh Jamal Dhanmondi Club	(Nigeria) Joseph Afusi	End of contract	29 April 2019	13	7	(Bangladesh) Shafiqul Islam Manik	1 May 2019
Brothers Union	(India) Syed Nayeemuddin	–	–	13	11	(Bangladesh) Mohidur Rahman	–

== Foreign players ==
Club	Player 1	Player 2	Player 3	Player 4 (AFC)	Former
Arambagh KS	(Cameroon) Paul Emile Biyaga	(Nigeria) Matthew Chinedu	(Uzbekistan) Tuychibaev Murodjon	(Uzbekistan) Ikbol Bobohonov	(Nigeria) Kingsley Chukwudi Nkurumeh
Bashundhara Kings	(Brazil) Marcos Vinícius	(Costa Rica) Daniel Colindres	(Trinidad and Tobago) Willis Plaza	(Kyrgyzstan) Bakhtiyar Duyshobekov	(Spain) Jorge Gotor
Brothers Union	(Ivory Coast) Lancine Touré	(Egypt) Mohamed Osman Abdelaty	(South Sudan) James Moga	(South Korea) Park Jae-hyeong	(Brazil) Everton Souza Santos (Brazil) Leonardo Vieira Lima (Panama) Jack Daniels Meza Aguilar (Iraq) Muayad Khalid
Chittagong Abahani Ltd.	(The Gambia) Momodou Bah	(Nigeria) Nkwocha Kingsley Chigozie	(Nigeria) Mufta Lawal	(Kyrgyzstan) Daniel Tagoe	(Nigeria) Magalan Awala
Dhaka Abahani Ltd.	(Brazil) Wellington Priori	(Haiti) Kervens Belfort	(Nigeria) Sunday Chizoba	(Afghanistan) Masih Saighani	(South Korea) Ko Min-hyuk
Dhaka Mohammedan SC Ltd.	(Cameroon) Jean Jules Ikanga	(Nigeria) Cyril Oriaku	(Mali) Souleymane Diabate	(Japan) Uryu Nagata	(The Gambia) Landing Darboe (Nigeria) Nkwocha Kingsley Chigozie
Lt. Sheikh Jamal Dhanmondi Club Ltd.	(The Gambia) Ebou Kanteh	(The Gambia) Emil Sambou	(The Gambia) Solomon King Kanform	(Kyrgyzstan) David Tetteh	(Argentina) Luciano Araya (The Gambia) Sainey Bojang
Muktijoddha Sangsad KC	(Guinea) Younoussa Camara	(Ivory Coast) Ballo Famoussa	(Trinidad and Tobago) Sean Bateau	(Japan) Yusuke Kato	
NoFeL Sporting Club	(Cameroon) Mickael Yonta	(Guinea) Ismael Bangoura	(Nigeria) Eleta Benjamin Jr.	–	
Rahmatganj MFS	(Democratic Republic of the Congo) Siyo Zunapio	(The Gambia) Landing Darboe	(Nigeria) Monday Osagie	(Uzbekistan) Furqat Hasanboev	(Nigeria) Damian Chigozie Udeh (Japan) Atsushi Yonezawa
Saif Sporting Club	(Brazil) Alessandro Celin	(Colombia) Deiner Córdoba	(Rwanda) Emery Bayisenge	(Uzbekistan) Otabek Zokirov	(Canada) Jhonattan Córdoba (Russia) Denis Bolshakov (South Korea) Park Seung-il
Sheikh Russel KC	(Nigeria) Alison Udoka	(Nigeria) Raphael Odovin Onwrebe	(Ukraine) Valeriy Hryshyn	(Uzbekistan) Alisher Azizov	(Brazil) Alex Rafael
Team BJMC	(Cameroon) Baybeck Esaie	(Nigeria) Eleta Kingsley	(Nigeria) Samson Iliasu	(Uzbekistan) Otabek Valijonov	(Uzbekistan) Furqat Hasanboev

== League table ==
Pos	Team	Pld	W	D	L	GF	GA	GD	Pts	Qualification or relegation
1	Bashundhara Kings (C, Q)	24	20	3	1	54	14	+40	63	Qualification for AFC Cup group stage
2	Dhaka Abahani Ltd. (Q)	24	19	1	4	60	28	+32	58	Qualification for AFC Cup preliminary round 2
3	Sheikh Russel KC	24	16	4	4	43	20	+23	52	
4	Saif Sporting Club	24	14	5	5	40	24	+16	47	
5	Arambagh KS	24	10	3	11	33	32	+1	33	
6	Lt. Sheikh Jamal DC	24	7	7	10	31	37	−6	28	
7	Muktijoddha Sangsad KC	24	6	8	10	26	38	−12	26	
8	Chittagong Abahani Ltd.	24	5	10	9	22	26	−4	25	
9	Dhaka Mohammedan SC Ltd.	24	6	7	11	31	40	−9	25	
10	Rahmatganj MFS	24	4	10	10	34	53	−19	22	
11	Brothers Union	24	5	6	13	28	49	−21	21	
12	NoFeL Sporting Club (R)	24	5	5	14	23	42	−19	20	Relegation to Bangladesh Championship League
13	Team BJMC (R)	24	2	5	17	14	36	−22	11	Relegation to Bangladesh Championship League

Source: BFF
Rules for classification: 1) Points; 2) Goal difference; 3) Goals scored.
(C) Champions; (Q) Qualify for the AFC competition; (R) Relegated

Champions

1st title

== Results ==
Home \ Away	AKS	BK	BU	CAL	DAL	MSC	SJDC	MUK	NFL	RAH	SSC	SRKC	BJMC
Arambagh	—	0–3	0–1	2–0	1–2	4–1	0–1	2–1	1–0	6–3	1–1	0–1	2–1
Kings	3–2	—	5–0	3–0	3–0	1–1	3–1	4–1	2–0	1–0	3–2	1–0	2–0
Brothers	2–5	0–2	—	1–1	3–5	3–3	0–1	0–0	2–1	0–0	1–2	2–3	2–0
Ctg Abahani	0–1	1–1	3–2	—	2–2	0–0	0–0	1–0	0–1	1–2	1–1	3–0	0–0
Abahani	3–0	0–1	4–0	2–0	—	3–0	4–1	2–0	2–1	5–2	4–1	1–0	1–0
Mohammedan	1–0	1–4	0–1	2–0	4–0	—	1–1	1–2	3–1	2–2	1–2	2–4	2–1
Sheikh Jamal	2–0	0–1	2–5	2–0	3–4	2–1	—	1–1	2–2	2–2	0–3	0–0	1–2
Muktijoddha	1–1	1–3	3–0	1–4	1–4	1–1	3–0	—	1–1	0–0	0–2	1–6	2–0
NoFeL	1–2	1–3	2–0	0–3	0–2	1–0	0–0	0–2	—	5–2	0–3	0–4	0–0
Rahmatganj	1–1	2–3	2–2	1–1	1–5	2–1	0–4	2–2	2–2	—	1–2	0–2	3–2
Saif	0–1	0–2	2–0	0–0	1–3	1–1	3–2	3–1	1–0	2–1	—	1–1	3–0
Sheikh Russel	2–1	1–0	3–1	1–0	2–0	3–0	2–1	0–0	2–0	2–2	0–3	—	3–1
BJMC	1–0	0–0	0–0	1–1	1–2	1–2	0–2	0–1	3–4	0–1	0–1	0–1	—

Source: BFF
Legend: Blue = home team win; Yellow = draw; Red = away team win.

=== Positions by round ===
The following table lists the positions of teams after each week of matches. In order to preserve the chronological evolution, any postponed matches are not included to the round at which they were originally scheduled but added to the full round they were played immediately afterward.

Team ╲ Round	1	2	3	4	5	6	7	8	9	10	11	12	13	14	15	16	17	18	19	20	21	22	23	24	25	26
Arambagh	11	5	2	3	5	6	5	5	5	5	5	5	5	5	5	5	5	5	5	5	5	5	5	5	5	5
Kings	5	1	1	1	1	1	2	1	1	1	1	1	1	1	1	1	1	1	1	1	1	1	1	1	1	1
Brothers	7	10	7	9	9	9	12	13	13	13	12	12	11	12	12	12	12	12	12	12	11	12	11	11	10	11
Ctg Abahani	4	4	6	7	6	7	7	8	8	8	8	7	8	7	6	7	7	7	6	6	7	7	7	7	8	8
Abahani	1	8	5	4	2	2	1	2	2	2	2	2	2	2	2	2	2	2	2	2	2	2	2	2	2	2
Mohammedan	2	7	9	10	11	11	10	10	11	11	11	11	12	11	10	10	10	11	11	9	9	9	9	8	9	9
Sheikh Jamal	13	13	12	8	7	5	6	6	6	7	7	8	7	8	8	6	6	6	7	7	6	6	6	6	6	6
Muktijoddha	12	6	8	6	8	8	8	7	7	6	6	6	6	6	7	8	8	8	8	8	8	8	8	9	7	7
NoFeL	8	11	13	13	12	12	13	9	10	9	10	10	10	10	11	11	11	10	9	10	10	11	12	12	12	12
Rahmatganj	9	9	10	11	10	10	9	11	9	10	9	9	9	9	9	9	9	9	10	11	12	10	10	10	11	10
Saif	3	3	4	5	4	4	4	4	4	4	4	4	4	4	4	4	4	3	3	4	4	4	4	4	4	4
Sheikh Russel	6	2	3	2	3	3	3	3	3	3	3	3	3	3	3	3	3	4	4	3	3	3	3	3	3	3
BJMC	10	12	11	12	13	13	11	12	12	12	13	13	13	13	13	13	13	13	13	13	13	13	13	13	13	13

Leader
Relegation to BCL

Source: BFF

== Season statistics ==
=== Top goalscorers ===
As of 3 August 2019

Rank	Player	Club	Goals
1	Raphael Odovin Onwrebe	Sheikh Russel KC	22
2	Sunday Chizoba	Dhaka Abahani	20
3	Nabib Newaj Jibon	Dhaka Abahani	16
4	Marcos Vinícius	Bashundhara Kings	14
5	Siyo Zunapio	Rahmatganj MFS	13
6	Ismael Bangoura	NoFeL Sporting Club	12
7	Motin Mia	Bashundhara Kings	11
7	Deiner Córdoba	Saif Sporting Club	11
7	Ballo Famoussa	Muktijoddha Sangsad KC	11
7	Daniel Colindres	Bashundhara Kings	11
11	Solomon King Kanform	Sheikh Jamal Dhanmondi Club	9
11	Paul Emile Biyaga	Arambagh KS	9
13	Souleymane Diabate	Dhaka Mohammedan	8
13	Mannaf Rabby	Brothers Union	8
15	Toklis Ahmed	Dhaka Mohammedan	7
15	Yusuke Kato	Muktijoddha Sangsad KC	7
15	Bakhtiyar Duyshobekov	Bashundhara Kings	7
15	Matthew Chinedu	Arambagh KS	7
19	Denis Bolshakov	Saif Sporting Club	6
19	Momodou Bah	Chittagong Abahani	6
19	Zahid Hossain	Arambagh KS	6
19	Arifur Rahman	Arambagh KS	6
19	James Moga	Brothers Union	6
19	Otabek Valijonov	Team BJMC	6
19	Emil Sambou	Sheikh Jamal Dhanmondi Club	6
26	Jewel Rana	Dhaka Abahani	5
26	Shakhawat Hossain Rony	Sheikh Jamal Dhanmondi Club	5
26	Alessandro Celin	Saif Sporting Club	5
26	Landing Darboe	Dhaka Mohammedan	5
26	Alisher Azizov	Sheikh Russel KC	5
31	Luciano Araya	Sheikh Jamal Dhanmondi Club	4
31	Biplu Ahmed	Sheikh Russel KC	4
31	Khandokar Ashraful Islam	NoFeL Sporting Club	4
31	Mohamed Sohel Rana	Rahmatganj MFS	4
31	Nkwocha Chigosu	Chittagong Abahani	4
31	Kervens Belfort	Dhaka Abahani	4
31	Samson Iliasu	Team BJMC	4
31	Otabek Zokirov	Saif Sporting Club	4
39	Mehedi Hasan Royal	Muktijoddha Sangsad KC	3
39	Faysal Ahmed	Rahmatganj MFS	3
39	Ebou Kanteh	Sheikh Jamal Dhanmondi Club	3
39	Rakibul Islam	Rahmatganj MFS	3
39	Nasiruddin Chowdhury	Bashundhara Kings	3
39	Rahim Uddin	Saif Sporting Club	3
39	Kingsley Chigozie	Chittagong Abahani	3
39	Sohel Mia	Chittagong Abahani	3
39	Mamunul Islam	Dhaka Abahani	3
39	Leonardo Vieira Lima	Brothers Union	3
39	Eleta Kingsley	Team BJMC	3
39	Magalam Awala	Chittagong Abahani	3
39	Ndukaku Alison	Sheikh Russel KC	3
39	Valeriy Hryshyn	Sheikh Russel KC	3
53	Ariful Islam Shanto	Brothers Union	2
53	Enamul Islam Gazi	Rahmatganj MFS	2
53	Foysal Ahmed Fahim	Saif Sporting Club	2
53	Faisal Ahmed Shitol	Dhaka Abahani	2
53	Farhad Mona	NoFeL Sporting Club	2
53	Habibur Rahman Sohag	Dhaka Mohammedan	2
53	Jakir Hossain Ziku	Sheikh Jamal Dhanmondi Club	2
53	Jamal Bhuyan	Saif Sporting Club	2
53	Jamir Uddin	NoFeL Sporting Club	2
53	Kamrul Islam	NoFeL Sporting Club	2
53	Kawsar Ali Rabbi	Dhaka Mohammedan	2
53	Khalekurzaman Sabuj	Sheikh Russel KC	2
53	Rabiul Hasan	Arambagh KS	2
53	Minhajul Abedin Ballu	Brothers Union	2
53	Sheikh Alamgir Kabir Rana	Bashundhara Kings	2
53	Yousuf Sifat	Dhaka Mohammedan	2
53	Masih Saighani	Dhaka Abahani	2
53	Alex Rafael	Sheikh Russel KC	2
53	Daniel Tagoe	Chittagong Abahani	2
53	Younoussa Camara	Muktijoddha Sangsad KC	2
53	Uryu Nagata	Dhaka Mohammedan	2
53	Monday Osagie	Rahmatganj MFS	2
75	Amir Hakim Bappy	Dhaka Mohammedan	1
75	Chowmrin Rakhanie	Rahmatganj MFS	1
75	Didarul Alam	Rahmatganj MFS	1
75	Didarul Islam	Chittagong Abahani	1
75	Emon Mahmud	Bashundhara Kings	1
75	Habibur Rahman Nolak	Muktijoddha Sangsad KS	1
75	Jabed Khan	Saif Sporting Club	1
75	Jafar Iqbal	Saif Sporting Club	1
75	Jahid Hasan Ameli	Dhaka Mohammedan	1
75	Kawshik Barua	Chittagong Abahani	1
75	Mamun Miah	Dhaka Abahani	1
75	Mohammad Al Amin	Team BJMC	1
75	Mohammad Ibrahim	Bashundhara Kings	1
75	Mohammad Mokaram	Brothers Union	1
75	Mostakim Shahriar Shaikh	Brothers Union	1
75	Mehebub Hasan Nayan	Saif Sporting Club	1
75	Mohammad Roman	NoFeL Sporting Club	1
75	Mohammad Sohel Rana	Sheikh Russel KC	1
75	Naimur Rahman Shahed	Chittagong Abahani	1
75	Nurul Nayeem Faisal	Bashundhara Kings	1
75	Rasel Khan Evan	Muktijoddha Sangsad KC	1
75	Riyadul Hasan Rafi	Saif Sporting Club	1
75	Rubel Miya	Dhaka Abahani	1
75	Shahriar Bappy	Arambagh KS	1
75	Shajjad Hossain	Saif Sporting Club	1
75	Sohel Rana	Dhaka Abahani	1
75	Sujon Biswas	Muktijoddha Sangsad KC	1
75	Sushanto Tripura	Bashundhara Kings	1
75	Tawhidul Alam Sabuz	Bashundhara Kings	1
75	Topu Barman	Dhaka Abahani	1
75	Everton Souza Santos	Brothers Union	1
75	Jean Jules Ikanga	Dhaka Mohammedan	1
75	David Tetteh	Sheikh Jamal Dhanmondi Club	1
75	Kingsley Chukwudi Nkurumeh	Arambagh KS	1
75	Jack Daniels Meza Aguilar	Brothers Union	1
75	Ko Min-hyuk	Dhaka Abahani	1
75	Park Jae-hyeong	Brothers Union	1
75	Park Seung-il	Saif Sporting Club	1
75	Furqat Hasanboev	Rahmatganj MFS	1
Own Goals			11
Total			439

=== Own goals ===
† Bold Club indicates winner of the match

Player	Club	Opponent	Result	Date
Ashraful Karim	Brothers Union	Sheikh Russel KC	2–3	25 January 2019
Ballo Famoussa	Muktijoddha Sangsad KC	Dhaka Abahani	0–2	28 January 2019
Riyadul Hasan Rafi	Saif Sporting Club	Brothers Union	2–1	3 February 2019
Yeasin Khan	Sheikh Russel KC	Saif Sporting Club	1–1	8 February 2019
Shofiqul Islam	Brothers Union	Chittagong Abahani	2–3	8 February 2019
Uttom Ray	Brothers Union	Dhaka Abahani	0–4	17 February 2019
Monir Hossain	Sheikh Jamal Dhanmondi Club	Dhaka Mohammedan	1–1	22 February 2019
Zahidul Islam Babu	Arambagh KS	Bashundhara Kings	2–3	24 February 2019
Monjurur Rahman Manik	Sheikh Jamal Dhanmondi Club	Dhaka Abahani	3–4	13 April 2019
Tutul Hossain Badsha	Dhaka Abahani	Brothers Union	5–3	8 July 2019
Mamun Miah	Dhaka Abahani	Sheikh Jamal Dhanmondi Club	4–1	29 July 2019

As of

=== Hat-tricks ===
† Bold Club indicates winner of the match

Player	For	Against	Result	Date	Ref
Ballo Famoussa	Muktijoddha Sangsad KC	Sheikh Jamal Dhanmondi Club	3–0	23 January 2019	
Zahid Hossain	Arambagh KS	Dhaka Mohammedan	4–1	25 January 2019	
Nabib Newaj Jibon	Dhaka Abahani	Rahmatganj MFS	5–1	2 February 2019	
Sunday Chizoba	Dhaka Abahani	Rahmatganj MFS	5–2	15 June 2019	
Ismael Bangoura	NoFeL Sporting Club	Rahmatganj MFS	5–2	28 June 2019	
Ismael Bangoura	NoFeL Sporting Club	Team BJMC	4–3	4 July 2019	
Motin Mia	Bashundhara Kings	Brothers Union	5–0	16 July 2019	
Raphael Odovin Onwrebe	Sheikh Russel KC	NoFeL Sporting Club	4–0	16 July 2019	
Matthew Chinedu	Arambagh KS	Brothers Union	5–2	2 August 2019	
Raphael Odovin Onwrebe	Sheikh Russel KC	Team BJMC	3–1	2 August 2019	

=== Clean sheets ===
Rank	Player	Club	Clean sheets
1	(Bangladesh) Anisur Rahman Zico	Bashundhara Kings	12
2	(Bangladesh) Ashraful Islam Rana	Sheikh Russel KC	11

== Awards ==
Award	Winner	Club
BPL Coach of the Season	(Spain) Óscar Bruzón	Bashundhara Kings
BPL Player of the Season	(Costa Rica) Daniel Colindres	Bashundhara Kings
BPL Goalkeeper of the Season	(Bangladesh) Ashraful Islam Rana	Sheikh Russel KC
BPL Emerging Player of the Season	(Bangladesh) Rabiul Hasan	Arambagh KS
Fair Play Trophy (as a club)	Sheikh Russel KC	
