= 2017–18 Bangladesh Premier League (football) =

10th professional season of the top-flight football league in Bangladesh

Bangladesh Premier League
- Season: 2017–18
- Dates: 28 July 2017-13 January 2018
- Champions: Dhaka Abahani (6th titles)
- Relegated: Farashganj SC
- AFC Cup: Dhaka Abahani; Saif Sporting Club
- Matches: 132
- Goals: 302 (2.29 per match)
- Top goalscorer: 15 Goals (The Gambia) Solomon King Kanform (Nigeria) Raphael Odovin Onwrebe (Shiekh Jamal)
- Highest scoring: Arambagh KS 4-6 Sheikh Jamal Dhanmondi Club; 11 December 2017
- Longest winning run: 9 Matches; Dhaka Abahani
- Longest unbeaten run: 14 Matches; Saif Sporting Club
- Longest winless run: 18 Matches; Rahmatganj MFS
- Longest losing run: 5 Matches; Muktijoddha Sangsad KC

The 2017–18 Bangladesh Premier League (also known as SAIF Power Battery Bangladesh Premier League for sponsorship reasons) is the tenth season of the Bangladesh Premier League since its establishment in 2007. A total of 12 teams are competing in the league. Saif Global Sports are the right holder of BPL's tenth edition and they accommodate the advertising, branding, TV transmission, radio, marketing rights of the Bangladesh Premier League 2016–17. The league started from July 28, 2017. Fakirerpool Young Men's Club was promoted as the champion of 2016 BCL season. They were supposed to be the 13th team to participate in this season, but they did not, due to fund crisis.

Dhaka Abahani are the defending champions, having won their Bangladesh Premier League title the previous season.

== Teams ==
=== Stadiums and locations ===
The matches were held in a single venue.

Locations of teams in Bangladesh Premier League 2017-18

Stadium	Location
Bangabandhu Stadium	Dhaka

=== Personnel and sponsoring ===
Team	Head coach	Captain	Shirt sponsor	Kit manufacturer
Brothers Union	(Cyprus) Nicolas Vitorovic	(Bangladesh) Ashraful Karim	Biswas Builders Limited	
Chittagong Abahani Limited	(Bangladesh) Zulfiker Mahmud Mintu	(Bangladesh) Zahid Hossain	SAIF Powertec Limited	
Dhaka Abahani Limited	(Bangladesh) Atiqur Rahman	(Bangladesh) Mamun Miah		
Dhaka Mohammedan SC Limited	(Bangladesh) Rashed Ahmed Pappu	(Bangladesh) Jahid Hasan Ameli	Orion Group	
Farashganj SC	(Bangladesh) Mohidur Rahman	(Bangladesh) Joshimuddin Sujon		
Muktijoddha Sangsad KC	(Bangladesh) Masud Parvez Kaiser	(Bangladesh) Saidul Haque		
Rahmatganj MFS	(Bangladesh) Kamal Babu	(Bangladesh) Naimur Rahman Sahed	Tiger Cement	
Saif Sporting Club	(England) Ryan Northmore	(Bangladesh) Jamal Bhuyan	SAIF Powertec Limited	
Lt.Sheikh Jamal Dhanmondi Club Limited	(Bangladesh) Mahabub Hossain Roksy	(Bangladesh) Didarul Haque		
Sheikh Moni Arambagh KS	(Bangladesh) Maruful Haque	(Bangladesh) Abu Sufiyan Sufil		
Sheikh Russel KC	(Bangladesh) Shafiqul Islam Manik	(Bangladesh) Shahedul Alam Shahed	Bashundhara Cement	Bashundhara Group
Team BJMC	(Bangladesh) Saidul Islam	(Bangladesh) Arifuzzaman Himel		

=== Managerial Changes ===
Team	Outgoing Manager	Incoming Manager	Appointment
Brothers Union	(Italy) Giovanni Scanu	(Cyprus) Nicolas Vitorovic	After Round 4 of 1st leg
Dhaka Mohammedan	(India) Syed Nayeemuddin	(Bangladesh) Rashed Ahmed Pappu	
Saif Sporting Club	(England) (Ghana) Kim Grant	(England) Ryan Northmore	Mid-transfer Window
Sheikh Jamal Dhanmondi Club	(Nigeria) Joseph Afusi	(Bangladesh) Mahabub Hossain Roksy	After Round 1 of Leg 2
Farashganj SC	(Bangladesh) Mohammad Abu Yusuf	(Bangladesh) Mohidur Rahman	
Dhaka Abahani	(Serbia) Drago Mamić	(Bangladesh) Atiqur Rahman	
Chittagong Abahani	(Bangladesh) Saiful Bari Titu	(Bangladesh) Zulfiker Mahmud Mintu	After Round 9 of Leg 2
Team BJMC	(Bangladesh) Jakaria Babu	(Bangladesh) Saidul Islam	

== Foreign Players ==
Club	Player 1	Player 2	Player 3	Former players
Brothers Union	(Democratic Republic of the Congo) Siyo Zunapio	(Ghana) Twum Frank	(Haiti) Walson Augustin	(Nigeria) Samuel Adams
Chittagong Abahani Ltd.	(Nigeria) Afeez Oladipo	(Nigeria) Mufta Lawal	(Nigeria) Ndukaku Udoka Alison	(Haiti) Leonel Saint-Preux
Dhaka Abahani Ltd.	(The Gambia) Landing Darboe	(Ghana) Samad Yussif	(Nigeria) Emeka Onuoha	(Nigeria) Sunday Chizoba
Dhaka Mohammedan SC Ltd.	(Nigeria) Nkwocha Kingsley Chigozie	(Nigeria) Samuel Adams	(Nigeria) Samson Iliasu	(Haiti) Walson Augustin
Farashganj SC	(The Gambia) Lamine Camara	(The Gambia) Malick Mendy	(Nigeria) Matthew Chinedu	
Lt.Sheikh Jamal Dhanmondi Club Ltd.	(The Gambia) Momodou Bah	(Nigeria) Raphael Odovin	(The Gambia) Solomon King Kanform	
Muktijoddha Sangsad KC	(Egypt) Islam Mohamed Zaky	(Ghana) Abass Inusah	(Nigeria) Ngwoke Ejike Collins	(Nigeria) Magalan Ugochukwu (Cameroon) Lionel William Ndoe Mekong
Rahmatganj MFS	(The Gambia) Mustapha Jatta	(Guinea) Ismael Bangoura	(Nigeria) Monday Osagie	(The Gambia) Dawda Ceesay (Nigeria) Afeez Oladipo
Saif Sporting Club	(Cameroon) Alvi Fokou Fopa	(Colombia) Deiner Córdoba	(Colombia) Hember Valencia	(Haiti) Wedson Anselme (England) Charlie Sheringham
Arambagh KS	(Cameroon) Jean Jules Ikanga	(Nigeria) Alamu Bukola Olaleken	(Nigeria) Kingsley Chukwudi Nkurumeh	
Sheikh Russel KC	(Egypt) Ahmed Said	(The Gambia) Dawda Ceesay	(Nigeria) Eleta Benjamin Jr.	(Egypt) Islam Mohamed Zaky (Spain) Bidari García (Haiti) Jacques Francois
Team BJMC	(Cameroon) Baybeck Esaie	(Cameroon) Yoko Samnic Steve Thomas	(Nigeria) Eleta Kingsley	(Guinea) Ismael Bangoura

== League table ==
Pos	Team	Pld	W	D	L	GF	GA	GD	Pts	Qualification or relegation
1	Dhaka Abahani Ltd. (Note: Dhaka Abahani Ltd. qualified 2018 AFC Cup by winning 2017 Bangladesh Federation Cup) (C, Q)	22	16	4	2	35	13	+22	52	Qualification to 2018 AFC Cup (Note: Only Dhaka Abahani, Saif, and Mohammedan are eligible to represent Bangladesh in the AFC Cup.)
2	Sheikh Jamal DC	22	14	5	3	45	23	+22	47	
3	Chittagong Abahani Ltd.	22	13	5	4	27	13	+14	44	
4	Saif Sporting Club (Q)	22	11	8	3	30	16	+14	41	Qualification to 2018 AFC Cup
5	Dhaka Mohammedan SC Ltd.	22	9	5	8	31	26	+5	32	
6	Sheikh Russel KC	22	6	9	7	21	21	0	27	
7	Brothers Union	22	5	7	10	20	30	−10	22	
8	Arambagh KS	22	5	6	11	25	35	−10	21	
9	Team BJMC	22	4	8	10	15	27	−12	20	
10	Rahmatganj MFS	22	3	9	10	19	30	−11	18	
11	Muktijoddha Sangsad KC	22	5	3	14	18	33	−15	18	
12	Farashganj SC (R)	22	4	5	13	16	35	−19	17	Relegation to BCL 2018–19

Updated to match(es) played on 13 January 2018. Source: FIFA
(C) Champions; (Q) Qualify for the AFC competition; (R) Relegated

== Season Statistics ==
=== Goalscorers ===
There have been 302 goals scored in 132 matches, for an average of 2.29 goals per match (as of February 2018).

15 goals

- (The Gambia) Solomon King Kanform (Sheikh Jamal DC)
- (Nigeria) Raphael Odovin Onwrebe (Sheikh Jamal DC)

13 goals

- (Nigeria) Nkwocha Kingsley Chigozie (Dhaka Mohammedan)

10 goals

- (Democratic Republic of the Congo) Siyo Zunapio (Brothers Union)

9 goals

- (Nigeria) Sunday Chizoba (Dhaka Abahani)
- (Nigeria) Alamu Bukola Olalekan (Arambagh KS)

8 goals

- (Nigeria) Eleta Kingsley (Team BJMC)
- (Bangladesh) Tawhidul Alam Sabuz (Chittagong Abahani)

7 goals

- (Haiti) Walson Augustin (Brothers Union & Dhaka Mohammedan)
- (Nigeria) Emeka Onuoha (Dhaka Abahani)

6 goals

- (Nigeria) Matthew Chinedu (Farashganj SC)
- (The Gambia) Dawda Ceesay (Rahmatganj MFS & Sheikh Russel KC)
- (Bangladesh) Nasir Chowdhury (Dhaka Abahani)
- (Nigeria) Magalan Ugochukwu (Muktijoddha Sangsad KC)
- (England) Charlie Sheringham (Saif Sporting Club)

5 goals

- (Bangladesh) Jewel Rana (Saif Sporting Club)
- (Colombia) Deiner Córdoba (Saif Sporting Club)
- (Nigeria) Afeez Oladipo (Chittagong Abahani & Rahmatganj MFS)

4 goals

- (Bangladesh) Zahid Hossain (Chittagong Abahani
- (Bangladesh) Nabib Newaj Jibon (Dhaka Abahani)
- (Guinea) Ismael Bangoura (Rahmatganj MFS & Team BJMC)
- (The Gambia) Momodou Bah (Sheikh Jamal DC)
- (Egypt) Islam Mohamed Zaky (Muktijoddha Sangsad KC & Sheikh Russel KC)
- (Nigeria) Ndukaku Udoka Alison (Chittagong Abahani)

3 goals

- (Bangladesh) Motin Mia (Saif Sporting Club)
- (Nigeria) Samson Iliasu (Dhaka Mohammedan)
- (Bangladesh) Zahid Parvez Chowdhury (Sheikh Jamal Dhanmondi Club)
- (Bangladesh) Rubel Miya (Dhaka Abahani)
- (Bangladesh) Nurul Absar (Sheikh Jamal Dhanmondi Club)
- (Bangladesh) Mohammed Julfikar (Sheikh Russel KC)
- (Bangladesh) Fazlay Rabbi (Sheikh Russel KC)
- (The Gambia) Landing Darboe (Dhaka Abahani)

2 goals

- (Bangladesh) Khalekurzaman Sabuj (Sheikh Russel KC)
- (Bangladesh) Biplu Ahmed (Dhaka Mohammedan)
- (Bangladesh) Nazmul Islam Rasel (Muktijoddha Sangsad KC)
- (Bangladesh) Mohammed Rajon Miya (Arambagh KS)
- (Bangladesh) Sohel Rana (Rahmatganj MFS)
- (Bangladesh) Rashedul Islam Shuvo (Rahmatganj MFS)
- (Bangladesh) Mohammed Ibrahim (Saif SC)
- (Colombia) Deiner Córdoba (Saif SC)
- (Bangladesh) Sumon Ali (Arambagh KS)
- (Bangladesh) Shaharier Bappy (Arambagh KS)
- (Bangladesh) Abu Sufian Zahid (Arambagh KS)
- (Bangladesh) Mohamed Shamim (Farashganj SC)
- (Bangladesh) Uttam Kumar Banik (Sheikh Russel KC)
- (Bangladesh) Toklis Ahmed (Dhaka Mohammedan)
- (Ghana) Abass Inusah (Muktijoddha Sangsad KC)
- (Bangladesh) Mohamed Mesbah (Brothers Union)
- (Bangladesh) Abdullah Al-Mamun (Team BJMC)
- (Bangladesh) Topu Barman (Saif SC)
- (Cameroon) Jean Jules Ikanga (Arambagh KS)
- (Bangladesh) Mohammed Biplob (Brothers Union)
- (Bangladesh) Mohamed Alamgir (Farashganj SC)
- (Haiti) Jacques Francois (Sheikh Russel KC)
- (Nigeria) Monday Osagie (Rahmatganj MFS)
- (Bangladesh) Towhidul Alam Towhid (Muktijoddha Sangsad KC)
- (Bangladesh) Mithun Chowdhury (Dhaka Mohammedan)
- (Haiti) Wedson Anselme (Saif SC)
- (Bangladesh) Amzad Ali Shamim (Muktijoddha Sangsad KC)
- (Bangladesh) Mohamed Elias (Rahmatganj MFS)

1 goal

- (Bangladesh) Emon Mahmud Babu (Dhaka Abahani)
- (Bangladesh) Mohammed Abdullah (Chittagong Abahani)
- (Bangladesh) Mohammad Jewel (Arambagh KS)
- (Bangladesh) Javed Khan (Sheikh Jamal DC)
- (Bangladesh) Hemanta Vincent Biswas (Saif SC)
- (Bangladesh) Naimur Rahman Shahed (Rahmatganj MFS)
- (Bangladesh) Pasbon Molla (Team BJMC)
- (Haiti) Leonel Saint-Preux (Chittagong Abahani Ltd.)
- (Bangladesh) Monsur Amin (Chittagong Abahani Ltd.)
- (Bangladesh) Saad Uddin (Dhaka Abahani)
- (Bangladesh) Shahedul Alam Shahed (Sheikh Russel KC)
- (Bangladesh) Rabiul Hasan (Arambagh KS)
- (Ghana) Twum Frank (Brothers Union)
- (Bangladesh) Faisal Mahmud (Dhaka Mohammedan)
- (Bangladesh) Mohammad Sujon (Farashganj SC)
- (Bangladesh) Yeasin Khan (Sheikh Jamal Dhanmondi Club)
- (Bangladesh) Zahid Hasan Ameli (Dhaka Mohammedan)
- (Bangladesh) Jamal Bhuyan (Saif SC)
- (Bangladesh) Mamunul Islam (Chittagong Abahani)
- (Bangladesh) Saikat Mahmud Munna (Muktijoddha Sangsad KC)
- (Bangladesh) Anik Hossain (Dhaka Mohammedan)
- (Bangladesh) Tahidur Lilon (Farashganj SC)
- (Bangladesh) Mohammed Sohel Rana (Arambagh KS)
- (Bangladesh) Mahmudul Biswas Munna (Farashganj SC)
- (Bangladesh) Sushanto Tripura (Chittagong Abahani Ltd.)
- (Bangladesh) Nasirul Islam Nasir (Dhaka Mohammedan)
- (Cameroon) Baybeck Esaie (Team BJMC)
- (Bangladesh) Soeb Mia (Team BJMC)
- (Bangladesh) Mohamed Mintu Sheikh (Dhaka Mohammedan)
- (Nigeria) Kingsley Chukwudi Nkurumeh (Arambagh KS)
- (Bangladesh) Jafar Iqbal (Chittagong Abahani Ltd.)
- (Bangladesh) Monaem Khan Raju (Sheikh Russel KC)
- (Bangladesh) Asif Hossain Rimon (Rahmatganj MFS)
- (The Gambia) Lamine Camara (Farashganj SC)
- (Bangladesh) Bishal Das (Brothers Union)
- (Cameroon) Yoko Samnic Steve Thomas (Team BJMC)
- (Bangladesh) Mehedi Hassan Tapu (Team BJMC)
- (Bangladesh) Ariful Islam Shanto (Brothers Union)
- (Bangladesh) Arif (Arambagh KS)
- (Bangladesh) Minhajul Abedin Ballu (Farashganj SC)
- (Nigeria) Eleta Benjamin Jr. (Sheikh Russel KC)

Source: Soccerway

=== Own goals ===
† Bold Club indicates winner of the match

Player	Club	Opponent	Result	Date
(The Gambia) Malick Mendy	Farashganj SC	Dhaka Abahani	0–2	30 July 2017
(Bangladesh) M. Monir	Dhaka Mohammedan	Sheikh Jamal DC	0–2	29 July 2017
(Bangladesh) Arafat Hossain	Arambagh KS	Muktijoddha Sangsad KC	0–2	9 August 2017
(Bangladesh) Ashraful Karim	Brothers Union	Arambagh KS	1–2	18 August 2017
(Nigeria) Ndukaku Alison	Chittagong Abahani	Sheikh Russel KC	3–1	12 August 2017
(Bangladesh) Jalal Miya	Arambagh KS	Sheikh Jamal DC	1–3	21 August 2017
(Bangladesh) Shaharier Bappy	Arambagh KS	Sheikh Jamal DC	1–3	21 August 2017
(Nigeria) Eleta Benjamin Jr.	Sheikh Russel KC	Farashganj SC	2–1	27 August 2017
(Democratic Republic of the Congo) Siyo Zunapio	Brothers Union	Chittagong Abahani	0–2	10 September 2017
(Bangladesh) Arup Kumar Baidya	Sheikh Russel KC	Saif SC	1–2	2 January 2018

=== Hat-tricks ===
Player	For	Against	Result	Date	Ref
(Colombia) Hember Valencia	Saif Sporting Club	Brothers Union	5–0	26 August 2017	
(Nigeria) Raphael Odovin ^{4}	Sheikh Jamal Dhanmondi Club	Farashganj SC	5–0	13 October 2017	
(Nigeria) Raphael Odovin	Sheikh Jamal Dhanmondi Club	Arambagh KS	6–4	11 December 2017	

^{4} Player scored 4 goals.

=== Discipline ===
==== Player ====
- Most yellow cards: 10
  - (The Gambia) Malick Mendy (Farashganj SC)
- Most yellow cards: 7
  - (Bangladesh) Sushanto Tripura (Chittagong Abahani)
  - (Bangladesh) Faysal Ahmed (Rahmatganj MFS)
  - (Bangladesh) Enamul Haque Sharif (Dhaka Mohammedan)
- Most yellow cards: 6
  - (Bangladesh) Arif Khan Joy (Brothers Union)
  - (Bangladesh) Mohammed Uddin Sujon (Farashganj SC)
  - (Bangladesh) Mehedi Hasan Royal (Team BJMC)
- Most red cards: 2
  - (Bangladesh) Arif Khan Joy (Brothers Union)
