= 2013–14 Bangladesh Premier League (football) =

7th professional season of the top-flight football league in Bangladesh

Bangladesh Premier League
- Season: 2013–14
- Dates: 27 December 2013 - 25 July 2014
- Champions: Sheikh Jamal
- Relegated: Baridhara
- AFC Cup: Sheikh Russel
- Matches: 135
- Goals: 382 (2.83 per match)
- Top goalscorer: 26 goals (Haiti) Wedson Anselme (Sheikh Jamal)
- Biggest home win: Muktijoddha Sangsad KC 8–0 Uttar Baridhara SC (25 July 2015); Sheikh Jamal DC 8–0 Uttar Baridhara SC (20 March 2015)
- Biggest away win: Chittagong Abahani 1–8 Sheikh Jamal DC (14 June 2014)
- Highest scoring: Chittagong Abahani 1–8 Sheikh Jamal DC (14 June 2014)
- Longest winning run: 5 matches Dhaka Abahani
- Longest unbeaten run: 19 matches Sheikh Jamal DC
- Longest winless run: 14 matches Feni Soccer Club; Uttar Baridhara SC
- Longest losing run: 10 matches Uttar Baridhara SC

The 2013–14 Bangladesh Premier League is also known as Nitol-Tata Bangladesh Premier Football League due to the sponsorship from Nitol-Tata. It was the 7th edition of the Bangladesh Premier League since its establishment in 2007. A total of 10 football clubs competed in the league. The country's top-flight football competition was started on 27 December 2013.

Sheikh Russell are the defending champions after claiming their first Bangladesh Premier League championship.

== Teams and locations ==
Locations of teams in the 2013-14 Bangladesh Premier League

Arambagh representing the city of Dhaka were relegated last season and replaced by Chittagong Abahani the 2013 Bangladesh Championship League champions and Baridhara.

Club	Stadium	Location
Baridhara	Bangabandhu National Stadium	Dhaka
Brothers Union	Bangabandhu National Stadium	Dhaka
Chittagong Abahani	MA Aziz Stadium	Chittagong
Dhaka Abahani	Bangabandhu National Stadium	Dhaka
Dhaka Mohammedan	Bangabandhu National Stadium	Dhaka
Feni Soccer Club	Bangabandhu National Stadium	Dhaka
Muktijoddha Sangsad	Sheikh Fazlul Haque Mani Stadium	Gopalganj
Sheikh Jamal	Bangabandhu National Stadium	Dhaka
Sheikh Russell	Bangabandhu National Stadium	Dhaka
Team BJMC	Bangabandhu National Stadium	Dhaka

== Foreign players ==
Club	Leg	Player 1	Player 2	Player 3	Player 4	Player 5	Player 6	Player 7
Sheikh Jamal Dhanmondi Club	First	(Nigeria) Ikechukwu Okemmira	(Haiti) Wedson Anselme	(Haiti) Sony Norde	(Nigeria) Emeka Darlington	(Nigeria) Emmanuel Ariwachukwu	(Nigeria) Ali Abdullahi	(Nigeria) Femi Orunnimi
Sheikh Jamal Dhanmondi Club	Second							
Sheikh Russel KC	First	(Uruguay) Francisco Usúcar	(Haiti) Pascal Millien	(Jamaica) Ricardo Cousine	(Morocco) Youness Roux	(Morocco) Mohamed Amine Bourichy	(France) Maxime Roger	
Sheikh Russel KC	Second							
Dhaka Abahani	First	(Ghana) Samad Yussif	(Ghana) Osei Morrison	(Brazil) Luiz Romulo de Castro	(Cameroon) Mbenoun Ekele Patrick	(Cameroon) Yoko Samnick	(Italy) Andre Luis de Souza	(Ghana) Awudu Ibrahim
Dhaka Abahani	Second	(Portugal) Leonildo Soares						
Dhaka Mohammedan	First	(Cameroon) Bayebeck Fombagne Esaie	(Nigeria) Chuka Charles	(Nigeria) Owadokun Sesan Idowu	(Egypt) Mostafa Mohamed Seddik	(Nigeria) Damien Chigozie	(Nigeria) Henry Felix	
Dhaka Mohammedan	Second							
Muktijoddha Sangsad KC	First	(Egypt) Mohamed Elgilant Mahmoud Nagi	(Cameroon) Atsafack Gerard Ledoux	(Nigeria) Eleta Kingsley	(Nigeria) Agbulu Inalegwu	(Nigeria) Nkwocha Kingsley Chigozie	(Nigeria) Sunday Chizoba	(Nigeria) Eleta Benjamin Jr.
Muktijoddha Sangsad KC	Second							
Brothers Union	First	(Nigeria) Victor Ighelohbo Antoni	(Nigeria) Nche Francis Kingsley	(Cameroon) Batamack Jean Eric	(Nigeria) Kester Akon	(Ghana) Isshah Yousuf	(Nigeria) Simon Ezeodka	
Brothers Union	Second	(Haiti) Walson Augustin						
Team BJMC	First	(Nigeria) Samson Iliasu	(Cameroon) Jean J Ikanga	(Guinea) Ousmane Cherif	(Nigeria) Uche Felix	(Guinea) Ismael Bangoura		
Team BJMC	Second							
Feni Soccer Club	First	(Nigeria) Ahmed Samson	(Nigeria) Okpoko Anthony Kezito Arinze	(The Gambia) Momodou Lamin	(The Gambia) Matthew Mendy	(Benin) Wassiou Okalawon	(The Gambia) Landing Darboe	(The Gambia) Kabba Jobe
Feni Soccer Club	Second	(Nigeria) Chuka Charles						
Chittagong Abahani	First	(Guinea) Mohamed Conte (Bangoura)	(Nigeria) Unwana David Udoh (Bright)	(Nigeria) Napoleon Gabriel	(Uganda) Michael Dumba			
Chittagong Abahani	Second	(Guinea) Ousman Cherif						
Uttar Baridhara	First	(Nigeria) Akindelek Oubowale	(Nigeria) Kosoko Olasukanmi	(Nigeria) Obafunsho Quadri Lanre	(India) Imtiaz Quasim (Saqib)	(India) Faiz Alam	(Kenya) Collins Tiego	
Uttar Baridhara	Second							

== Standings ==
=== League table ===
Pos	Team	Pld	W	D	L	GF	GA	GD	Pts	Qualification or relegation
1	Sheikh Jamal Dhanmondi Club (C, Q)	27	19	7	1	78	26	+52	64	2016 AFC Cup
2	Dhaka Abahani Limited	27	14	10	3	36	16	+20	52	
3	Muktijoddha Sangsad	27	14	7	6	54	26	+28	49	
4	Dhaka Mohammedan Sporting Club	27	12	9	6	36	25	+11	45	
5	Brothers Union	27	10	8	9	35	33	+2	38	
6	Sheikh Russel KC	27	8	8	11	38	35	+3	32	
7	Team BJMC	27	8	6	13	39	49	−10	30	
8	Chittagong Abahani	27	6	7	14	18	39	−21	25	
9	Feni Soccer Club	27	2	12	13	30	48	−18	18	
10	Baridhara (R)	27	2	6	19	18	85	−67	12	2014–15 Bangladesh Championship League

Source: Soccerway
Rules for classification: 1) points; 2) goal difference; 3) number of goals scored.
(C) Champions; (Q) Qualify for the AFC competition; (R) Relegated

== Season statistics ==
=== Goalscorers ===
There have been 382 goals scored in 135 matches, for an average of 2.83 goals per match (as of 31 March 2015).

26 goals

- (Haiti) Wedson Anselme (Sheikh Jamal DC)

21 goals

- (Nigeria) Emeka Darlington (Sheikh Jamal DC)

17 goals

- (Nigeria) Kingsley Chigozie (Muktijoddha Sangsad KC)

15 goals

- (Bangladesh) Wahed Ahmed (Dhaka Mohammedan)
- (Nigeria) Sunday Chizoba (Muktijoddha Sangsad KC)

14 goals

- (Bangladesh) Mithun Chowdhury (Sheikh Russel KC)

13 goals

- (Haiti) Sony Norde (Sheikh Jamal)
- (Guinea) Ismael Bangoura (Team BJMC)
- (Ghana) Osei Morrison (Dhaka Abahani)

12 goals

- (Nigeria) Samson Illiasu (Team BJMC)

9 goals

- (Bangladesh) Zahid Hasan Ameli (Dhaka Mohammedan)

8 goals

- (Haiti) Walson Augustin (Brothers Union)

7 goals

- (Nigeria) Kester Akon (Brothers Union)

6 goals

- (Ghana) Awudu Ibrahim (Dhaka Abahani)
- (Nigeria) Chuka Charles (Feni Soccer Club)
- (Kenya) Collins Tiego (Uttar Baridhara SC)

5 goals

- (Nigeria) Simon Ezeodka (Brothers Union)
- (The Gambia) Landing Darboe (Feni Soccer Club)
- (Nigeria) Eleta Kingsley (Muktijoddha Sangsad KC)

4 goals

- (Jamaica) Ricardo Cousine (Sheikh Russel KC)
- (The Gambia) Matthew Mendy (Feni Soccer Club)
- (Bangladesh) Rubel Miya (Brothers Union)
- (Bangladesh) Nasiruddin Chowdhury (Sheikh Jamal Dhanmondi Club)
- (Portugal) Leonildo Soares (Dhaka Abahani)
- (Guinea) Ousman Cherif (Chittagong Abahani)
- (Bangladesh) Shahedul Alam Shahed (Dhaka Abahani)
- (Bangladesh) Shakhawat Hossain Rony (Sheikh Jamal Dhanmondi Club)
- (Bangladesh) Aminur Rahman Sajib (Team BJMC)

3 goals

- (Bangladesh) Shohidul Islam Shopon (Uttar Baridhara SC)
- (Nigeria) Uche Felix (Team BJMC)
- (Haiti) Pascal Millien (Sheikh Russel KC)
- (Bangladesh) Jamal Hossain (Dhaka Abahani)
- (Bangladesh) Sabuz Kumar Bizwas (Sheikh Russel KC)
- (Bangladesh) Jabed Khan (Chittagong Abahani)
- (Bangladesh) Faisal Mahmud (Brothers Union)
- (Bangladesh) Abdullah Parvez (Team BJMC)
- (Bangladesh) Tawhidul Alam Sabuz (Dhaka Mohammedan)
- (Bangladesh) Md. Dulal (Uttar Baridhara SC)
- (Bangladesh) Ali Hasan (Feni Soccer Club)
- (Bangladesh) Shakil Ahmed (Sheikh Russel KC)
- (Nigeria) Eleta Benjamin (Muktijoddha Sangsad KC)
- (Bangladesh) Enamul Haque (Muktijoddha Sangsad KC)

2 goals

- (Morocco) Youness Roux (Sheikh Russel KC)
- (Benin) Wassiou Okalawon (Feni Soccer Club)
- (Nigeria) Victory Antony (Brothers Union)
- (Bangladesh) Emdadul Haque Manu (Uttar Baridhara SC)
- (Egypt) Mostafa Mohamed Seddik (Dhaka Mohammedan)
- (Bangladesh) Motiur Rahman (Feni Soccer Club)
- (Bangladesh) Md. Biplop (Muktijoddha Sangsad KC)
- (Bangladesh) Sohel Miah (Chittagong Abahani)
- (Bangladesh) Sujon Biswas (Uttar Baridhara SC)
- (Cameroon) Mbenoun Ekele Patrick (Dhaka Abahani)
- (Bangladesh) Md. Robin (Sheikh Russel KC)
- (Nigeria) Damien Chigozie (Dhaka Mohammedan)
- (Bangladesh) Shafikul Islam Bipul (Muktijoddha Sangsad KC)
- (Bangladesh) Azmal Hossian Bidyut (Feni Soccer Club)
- (Bangladesh) Anwar Hossain (Sheikh Russel KC)
- (Bangladesh) Md. Sumon (Sheikh Russel KC)
- (Bangladesh) Mamunul Islam (Sheikh Jamal DC)
- (Bangladesh) Nasirul Islam Nasir (Dhaka Abahani)
- (Bangladesh) Toklis Ahmed (Sheikh Jamal Dhanmondi Club)
- (Bangladesh) Atiqur Rahman Meshu (Dhaka Abahani)
- (Bangladesh) Mohammad Ibrahim (Muktijoddha Sangsad KC)
- (Bangladesh) Iqbal (Muktijoddha Sangsad KC)

1 goal

- (Bangladesh) Ahsanul Haque Milon (Chittagong Abahani)
- (France) Maxime Roger (Sheikh Russel KC)
- (Nigeria) Napoleon Gabriel (Chittagong Abahani)
- (Nigeria) Nche Francis (Brothers Union)
- (Nigeria) Ikechukwu Okemmira (Sheikh Jamal DC)
- (Bangladesh) Zahid Hossain (Sheikh Russel KC)
- (Bangladesh) Jewel Rana (Brothers Union)
- (Bangladesh) Safautur Rahman (Chittagong Abahani)
- (Bangladesh) Mejbabul Haque Manik (Dhaka Mohammedan)
- (Bangladesh) Masuk Mia Jony (Chittagong Abahani)
- (Bangladesh) Sayed Rased Turzo (Feni Soccer Club)
- (Ghana) Isshah Yousuf (Brothers Union)
- (Nigeria) Agbulu Inalegwu (Muktijoddha Sangsad KC)
- (Nigeria) Kosoko Olasukanmi (Uttar Baridhara SC)
- (Bangladesh) Saiful Islam (Team BJMC)
- (Guinea) Mohamed Conte (Chittagong Abahani)
- (Bangladesh) MD. Towhidul Alam (Dhaka Abahani)
- (The Gambia) Kabba Jobe (Feni Soccer Club)
- (Bangladesh) Ismael Jahed (Chittagong Abahani)
- (India) Faiz Alam (Uttar Baridhara SC)
- (Nigeria) Ali Abdullahi (Sheikh Jamal DC)
- (Bangladesh) Sohel Rana (Sheikh Jamal DC)
- (Bangladesh) Akbar Hossain Ridon (Feni Soccer Club)
- (Bangladesh) Sobuj Das Rogu (Dhaka Mohammedan)
- (Bangladesh) Abdul Hannan (Chittagong Abahani)
- (Nigeria) Henry Felix (Dhaka Mohammedan)
- (Bangladesh) Topu Barman (Dhaka Mohammedan)
- Mostapha (Sheikh Jamal Dhanmondi Club)
- (Bangladesh) Atiqur Rahman Fahad (Chittagong Abahani)
- (Bangladesh) Nabib Newaj Jibon (Team BJMC)
- (Bangladesh) Shapon (Team BJMC)
- (Bangladesh) Md. Jony (Chittagong Abahani)
- (Bangladesh) Rajib (Team BJMC)
- (Bangladesh) Abdul Malek (Brothers Union)
- (Bangladesh) Sohel Rana (Sheikh Russel KC)
- (Bangladesh) Shafikul Islam (Brothers Union)
- (Bangladesh) Arup Kumar Baidya (Dhaka Mohammedan)
- (Bangladesh) Yusuf Sifat (Dhaka Mohammedan)
- (Bangladesh) Chowmrin (Muktijoddha Sangsad KC)

=== Own goals ===
† Bold Club indicates winner of the match

Player	Club	Opponent	Result	Date
(Bangladesh) Saiful	Team BJMC	Sheikh Jamal DC	2–2	22 February 2014
(Bangladesh) Nasirul Islam Nasir	Dhaka Abahani	Brothers Union	0–1	18 April 2014

=== Hat-tricks ===
Player	For	Against	Result	Date	Ref
(Bangladesh) Mithun Chowdhury	Sheikh Russel KC	Uttar Baridhara	4–0	27 December 2013	
(Nigeria) Emeka Darlington	Sheikh Jamal DC	Brothers Union	4–1	8 January 2014	
(Nigeria) Emeka Darlington ^{4}	Sheikh Jamal DC	Uttar Baridhara	8–0	20 March 2014	
(Haiti) Wedson Anselme	Sheikh Jamal DC	Uttar Baridhara	8–0	20 March 2014	
(Nigeria) Kester Akon	Brothers Union	Uttar Baridhara	5–1	11 May 2014	
(Nigeria) Sunday Chizoba	Muktijoddha Sangsad KC	Chittagong Abahani	6–0	13 May 2014	
(Nigeria) Kingsley Chigozie	Muktijoddha Sangsad KC	Chittagong Abahani	6–0	13 May 2014	
(Nigeria) Emeka Darlington	Sheikh Jamal DC	Chittagong Abahani	8–1	14 June 2014	
(Bangladesh) Mithun Chowdhury ^{5}	Sheikh Russel KC	Uttar Baridhara	7–1	15 June 2014	
(Nigeria) Kingsley Chigozie	Muktijoddha Sangsad KC	Team BJMC	4–1	21 June 2014	
(Haiti) Sony Norde	Sheikh Jamal DC	Feni Soccer Club	5–2	24 June 2014	
(Haiti) Wedson Anselme	Sheikh Jamal DC	Team BJMC	4–1	10 July 2014	
(The Gambia) Landing Darboe	Feni Soccer Club	Uttar Baridhara	4–1	16 July 2014	
(Ghana) Osei Morrison	Dhaka Abahani	Sheikh Russel KC	5–2	19 July 2014	
(Bangladesh) Shakhawat Hossain Rony	Sheikh Jamal Dhanmondi Club	Uttar Baridhara	6–0	20 July 2014	
(Nigeria) Sunday Chizoba	Muktijoddha Sangsad KC	Uttar Baridhara	8–0	25 July 2014	

^{n} Player scored n goals.
