= 2017 Federation Cup (Bangladesh) =

29th season of the Bangladesh Federation Cup

Walton Federation Cup 2017

Tournament details
- Host country: Bangladesh
- Dates: 13 May – 6 June 2017
- Teams: 12

Final positions
- Champions: Dhaka Abahani (10th title)
- Runners-up: Chittagong Abahani

Tournament statistics
- Matches played: 19
- Goals scored: 40 (2.11 per match)
- Top scorer(s): Emeka Darlington (Dhaka Abahani); 3 goals
- Best player(s): Emon Mahmud Babu (Dhaka Abahani)

The 2017 Federation Cup also known as Walton Federation Cup 2017 due to the sponsorship from Walton was the 29th edition of the tournament. A total of 12 teams competed in this tournament. Dhaka Abahani was the winner of previous edition of the tournament.

The winner of the tournament earned the slot of playing qualifying round of the 2018 AFC Cup.

== Venues ==
Dhaka
Bangabandhu National Stadium
Capacity: 36,000
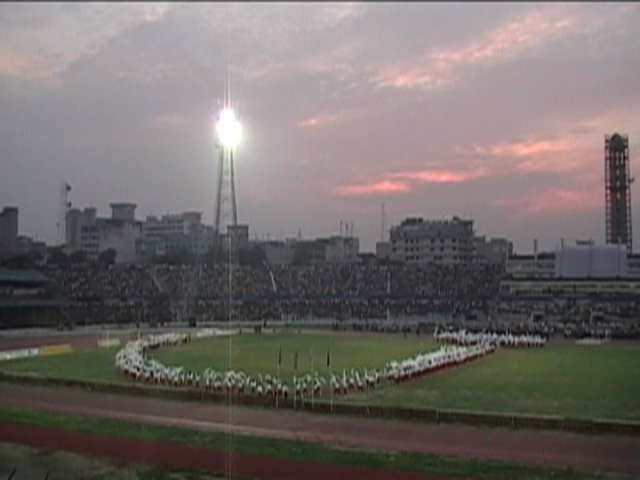

== Group stage ==
The twelve participants were divided into four groups. The top two teams for each group qualified for the quarterfinals.

=== Group A ===
Pos	Team	Pld	W	D	L	GF	GA	GD	Pts
1	Dhaka Abahani (A)	2	1	1	0	2	1	+1	4
2	Muktijoddha Sangsad KC (A)	2	1	0	1	1	1	0	3
3	Saif Sporting Club	2	0	1	1	1	2	−1	1

Source: bff.com.bd
(A) Advance to a further round
13 May 2017
17:00

Dhaka Abahani	1–1	Saif Sporting Club
Emeka Darlington 45+2'		Mohammad Ibrahim 69'

Bangabandhu National Stadium, Dhaka
Referee: Mizanur Rahman
15 May 2017
18:45

Saif Sporting Club	0–1	Muktijoddha Sangsad KC
		Islam Mohamed Zaky Sarhan 40'

Bangabandhu National Stadium, Dhaka
22 May 2017
17:30

Muktijoddha Sangsad KC	0–1	Dhaka Abahani
		Rubel Miya 29'

Bangabandhu National Stadium, Dhaka

=== Group B ===
Pos	Team	Pld	W	D	L	GF	GA	GD	Pts
1	Sheikh Jamal Dhanmondi Club (A)	2	2	0	0	3	0	+3	6
2	Sheikh Russel KC (A)	2	1	0	1	3	0	+3	3
3	Farashganj SC	2	0	0	2	0	6	−6	0

Source: bff.com.bd
(A) Advance to a further round
14 May 2017
16:30

Sheikh Jamal Dhanmondi Club	3–0	Farashganj SC
Momodou Bah 11'(pen.); Nurul Absar 47'; Sohel Mia 90'

Bangabandhu National Stadium, Dhaka
16 May 2017
16:30

Farashganj SC	0–3	Sheikh Russel KC
		Dawda Ceesay 32'; Arup Kumar Baidya 39'; Aminur Rahman Sajib 53'

Bangabandhu National Stadium, Dhaka
19 May 2017
17:30

Sheikh Russel KC	0–0	Sheikh Jamal Dhanmondi Club
Penalties
	1–4

Bangabandhu National Stadium, Dhaka

=== Group C ===
Pos	Team	Pld	W	D	L	GF	GA	GD	Pts
1	Chittagong Abahani (A)	2	2	0	0	4	2	+2	6
2	Dhaka Mohammedan (A)	2	1	0	1	3	3	0	3
3	Arambagh KS	2	0	0	2	2	4	−2	0

Source: bff.com.bd
(A) Advance to a further round
14 May 2017
18:45

Chittagong Abahani	2–1	Dhaka Mohammedan
Afeez Oladipo 36'; Kawshik Barua 56'		Toklis Ahmed 74'

Bangabandhu National Stadium, Dhaka
16 May 2017
18:45

Dhaka Mohammedan	2–1	Sheikh Moni Arambagh KS
Toklis Ahmed 35'; Nkwocha Kingsley Chigozie 66'		Robiul Hasan 13'

Bangabandhu National Stadium, Dhaka
18 May 2017
17:30

Sheikh Moni Arambagh KS	1–2	Chittagong Abahani
Jean Jules Ikanga 37'		Afeez Oladipo 34'; Ndukaku Alison 61'

Bangabandhu National Stadium, Dhaka

=== Group D ===
Pos	Team	Pld	W	D	L	GF	GA	GD	Pts
1	Rahmatganj MFS (A)	2	1	1	0	3	0	+3	4
2	Brothers Union (A)	2	0	2	0	1	1	0	2
3	Team BJMC	2	0	1	1	1	4	−3	1

Source: bff.com.bd
(A) Advance to a further round
13 May 2017
19:15

Brothers Union	1–1	Team BJMC
Siyo Zunapio 48'		Yoko Samnic Steve Thomas 69' (pen.)

Bangabandhu National Stadium, Dhaka
15 May 2017
16:30

Team BJMC	0–3	Rahmatganj MFS
		Monday Osagie 19'; Faisal Ahmed 31'; Rashedul Islam Shuvo 85'

Bangabandhu National Stadium, Dhaka
17 May 2017
17:30

Rahmatganj MFS	0–0	Brothers Union

Bangabandhu National Stadium, Dhaka

== Bracket ==
=== Quarterfinals ===
24 May 2017
18:00

Sheikh Jamal Dhanmondi Club	1–0	Dhaka Mohammedan
Solomon King 75'

Bangabandhu National Stadium, Dhaka

25 May 2017
18:00

Chittagong Abahani	1–1	Sheikh Russel KC
Zahid Hossain 13'		Mehebub Hasan Nayon 10'
Penalties
	4–2

Bangabandhu National Stadium, Dhaka

26 May 2017
18:00

Dhaka Abahani	2–1	Brothers Union
Nabib Newaj Jibon 43'; Rubel Miya 79'		Siyo Zunapio 90+3'

Bangabandhu National Stadium, Dhaka

27 May 2017
18:00

Rahmatganj MFS	3–1	Muktijoddha Sangsad KC
Shahran Hawlader 32', 69'; Ismael Bangoura 63'		Motiur Rahman 90+4'

Bangabandhu National Stadium, Dhaka

=== Semifinals ===
2 June 2017
19:15

Chittagong Abahani	1–0	Rahmatganj MFS
Mamunul Islam 8'

Bangabandhu National Stadium, Dhaka
Referee: Mizanur Rahman

3 June 2017
19:15

Sheikh Jamal Dhanmondi Club	0–1	Dhaka Abahani
		Emeka Darlington 66'

Bangabandhu National Stadium, Dhaka
Referee: Azad Rahman

=== Final ===
6 June 2017
19:30 BST

Chittagong Abahani	1–3	Dhaka Abahani
Ndukaku Alison 82' (pen.)	Report	Nabib Newaj Jibon 36'; Emon Mahmud Babu 45+2'; Emeka Darlington 48'

Bangabandhu National Stadium, Dhaka
Referee: MD Mizanur Rahman

== Goal scorers ==
As of

Top 8

No.	Name	Club	Goals
1.	(Nigeria) Emeka Darlington	Dhaka Abahani	3
2.	(Bangladesh) Nabib Newaj Jibon	Dhaka Abahani	2
3.	(Bangladesh) Rubel Miya	Dhaka Abahani	2
4.	(Bangladesh) Toklis Ahmed	Dhaka Mohammedan	2
5.	(Bangladesh) Shahran Hawlader	Rahmatganj MFS	2
6.	(Democratic Republic of the Congo) Siyo Zunapio	Brothers Union	2
7.	(Nigeria) Ndukaku Alison	Chittagong Abahani	2
8.	(Nigeria) Afeez Oladipo	Chittagong Abahani	2
