= Emon Mahmud Babu =

Bangladeshi footballer

Emon Babu
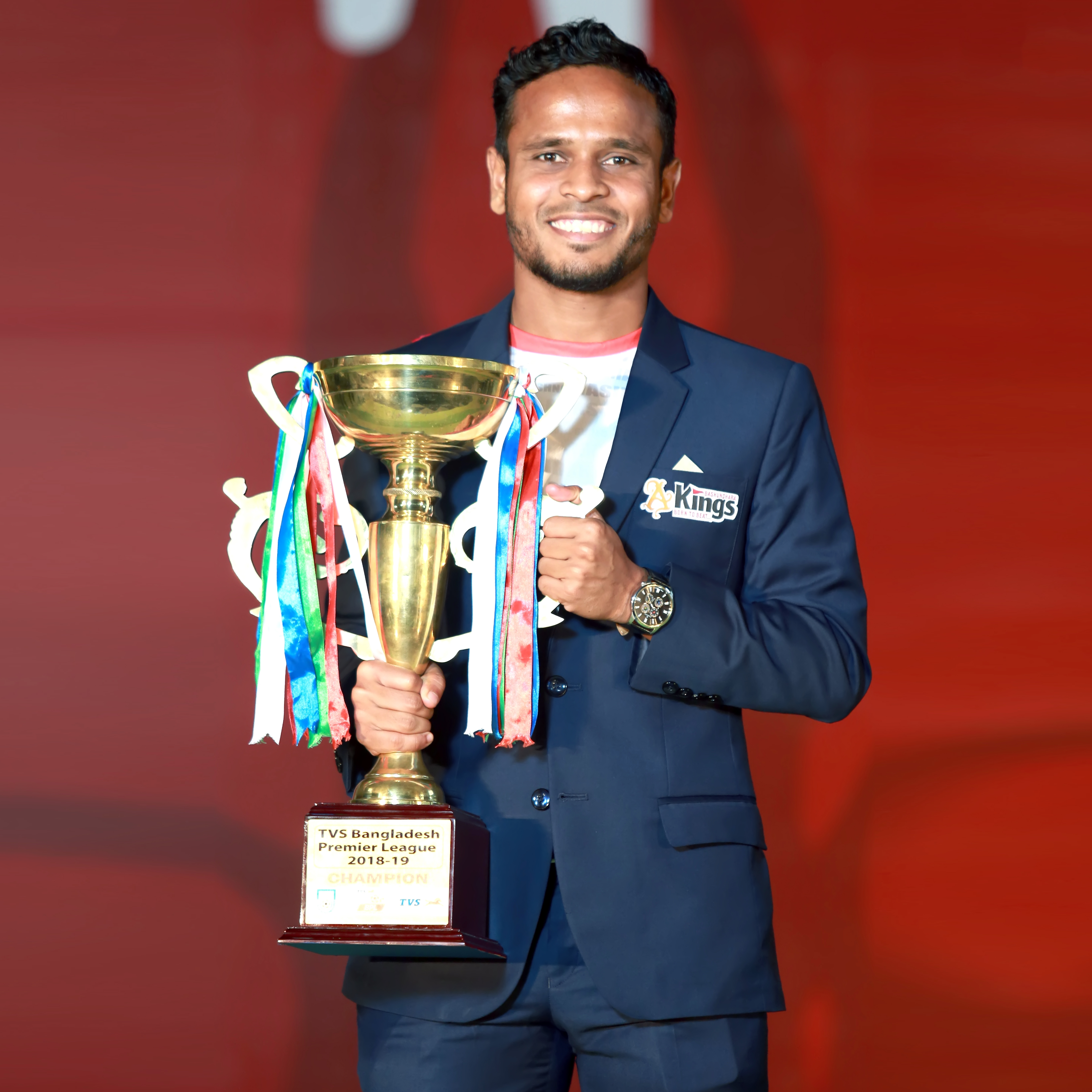
- Emon Mahmud with the 2018–19 Bangladesh Premier League trophy

Personal information
- Full name: Mohamed Emon Mahmud Babu
- Date of birth: 3 June 1991 (age 35)
- Place of birth: Dhaka, Bangladesh
- Height: 1.65 m (5 ft 5 in)
- Position: Defensive midfielder

Senior career*
Years	Team	Apps	(Gls)
2009	Farashganj SC	0	(0)
2009–2013	Sheikh Russel KC		(2)
2013–2014	Mohammedan SC		(0)
2015–2016	Dhaka Abahani		(0)
2017–2018	Dhaka Abahani	22	(1)
2018–2021	Bashundhara Kings	33	(1)
2021–2023	Dhaka Abahani	18	(2)
2023–2024	Sheikh Russel KC	16	(0)
2024–2025	Brothers Union	4	(0)

International career^{‡}
2009–2018	Bangladesh	14	(0)
- * Club domestic league appearances and goals as of 17 January 2025 ‡ National team caps and goals as of 15 October 2019

Emon Mahmud Babu (Bengali: ইমন মাহমুদ বাবু, born 3 June 1991) is a retired Bangladeshi professional footballer who last played as a midfielder for Bangladesh Premier League club Brothers Union. Emon has a record of winning hattrick Bangladesh Premier League championship, the first for a Bangladeshi player. He has won 10 trophies in his career, including four league titles, three Independence Cup and three Federation Cup trophies.

== International career ==
On 26 April 2009, Emon made his senior debut against Cambodia during 2010 AFC Challenge Cup qualification.

== Honours and achievements ==
Sheikh Russel KC

- Bangladesh Premier League: 2012–13
- Federation Cup: 2012
- Independence Cup: 2013

Mohammedan SC

- Independence Cup: 2014

Abahani Limited Dhaka

- Bangladesh Premier League: 2016, 2017–18
- Federation Cup: 2016, 2017

Bashundhara Kings

- Bangladesh Premier League: 2018–19
- Independence Cup: 2018–19

Individual

- Bangladesh Federation Cup Best Player: 2017
