= Ebou =

Ebou is a Gambian male given name. Notable people with the name include:

- Ebou Adams (born 1996), Gambian footballer
- Ebou Dibba (1943–2000), Gambian novelist and teacher
- Ebou Kanteh (born 1995), Gambian footballer
- Ebrima Ebou Sillah (born 1980), Gambian footballer
