= Sayed Rased Turzo =

Bangladeshi footballer

Personal information
- Full name: Sayed Rased Turzo
- Date of birth: 30 September 1990 (age 36)
- Place of birth: Khilgaon, Dhaka, Bangladesh
- Position: Striker

Youth career
- 2004: Pragati Sangsad
- 2008: Mohammedan SC

Senior career*
| Years | Team | Apps | (Gls) |
| 2006–2007 | Matuail Udayan Sangha | | |
| 2007–2008 | Victoria SC | | |
| 2009–2013 | Arambagh KS | | |
| 2013–2014 | Feni SC | | |
| 2015–2016 | Rahmatganj MFS | | |
| 2017–2018 | Sheikh Russel KC | 3 | (0) |
| 2019 | T&T Club Motijheel | | |

International career^{‡}
| 2016 | Bangladesh | 1 | (0) |
- * Club domestic league appearances and goals ‡ National team caps and goals as of 14 May 2021

Sayed Rased Turzo (born 30 September 1990) is a retired Bangladeshi professional footballer. He made one appearance for the Bangladesh national football team in 2016. He also represented Sheikh Russel KC in three matches of the 2017–18 Bangladesh Premier League. He was named in Bangladesh's squad for the 2019 AFC Asian Cup qualification tournament.

== Early career ==
Turzo played school level football in Japan, where he lived from 1996 to 2003.

== Personal life ==
Turzo's father, Moniruddin Ahmed, is a former national boxer.
