= Uttam Kumar Banik =

Bangladeshi footballer

Personal information
- Full name: Uttam Kumar Banik
- Date of birth: 12 April 1991 (age 35)
- Place of birth: Faridpur, Bangladesh
- Height: 1.86 m (6 ft 1 in)
- Position: Center back

Youth career
- 2004–2009: BKSP

Senior career*
Years	Team	Apps	(Gls)
2009–2013	Sheikh Russel KC		
2013–2014	Muktijoddha Sangsad		
2013	→ Team BJMC (loan)		
2014–2013	Sheikh Russel KC		
2021–2022	Uttar Baridhara	4	(0)

International career^{‡}
2011–2012	Bangladesh U23		(0)
2011	Bangladesh	1	(0)
- * Club domestic league appearances and goals as of 24 February 2022 ‡ National team caps and goals as of 27 March 2018

Uttam Kumar Banik (Bengali: উত্তম কুমার বণিক; born 12 April 1991) is a retired Bangladeshi professional footballer who plays as a defender. He last played for Bangladesh Premier League club Uttar Baridhara.

== Club career ==
A student of Bangladesh Krira Shikkha Protishtan (BKSP), Uttam spent the majority of his professional career with Sheikh Russel KC, before departing in 2021.

== International career ==
On 23 March 2011, Uttam made his debut for the Bangladesh national team against Myanmar in the 2012 AFC Challenge Cup qualifiers.

== Honours ==
Sheikh Russel KC

- Bangladesh Premier League: 2012–13
- Federation Cup: 2012
- Independence Cup: 2012–13
