= Mithun Chowdhury =

Bangladeshi footballer

Personal information
- Full name: Mithun Chowdhury Mithun
- Date of birth: 10 February 1989 (age 37)
- Place of birth: Narayanganj, Bangladesh
- Height: 1.60 m (5 ft 3 in)
- Position: Striker

Senior career*
Years	Team	Apps	(Gls)
2005–2008	Victoria		
2008–2010	Chittagong Abahani	40	(17)
2010–2012	Muktijoddha	42	(22)
2012–2016	Sheikh Russel	48	(26)
2017–2019	Mohammedan	13	(2)
2020–2021	Farashganj	4	(0)

International career^{‡}
2009–2014	Bangladesh	18	(2)
Medal record
Representing Bangladesh U-23
South Asian Games
Gold medal – first place	2010
- * Club domestic league appearances and goals ‡ National team caps and goals as of 27 October 2014

Mithun Chowdhury Mithun (born 10 February 1989) is a Bangladeshi footballer who last played as a striker for Farashganj SC in the Bangladesh Championship League. He also represented the Bangladesh national team and made his international debut in 2009. He captained the U23 team against Kuwait in 2012 Olympic Football Qualifiers. In 2014 FIFA World Cup Football Qualifiers, his maiden international goal broke the deadlock of the match against Lebanon in the second half in a memorable 2–0 win at Dhaka. On 16 June 2014, Mithun scored 5 goals in a single match for Sheikh Russel KC against the newly promoted Uttar Baridhara Club, in the 2013–14 Bangladesh Premier League.
