= Emil Sambou =

Gambian association football player

Personal information
- Date of birth: May 11, 1994 (age 32)
- Place of birth: Sifoe, Gambia
- Height: 1.84 m (6 ft 0 in)
- Position: Forward

Team information
- Current team: Engen Santos

Senior career*
Years	Team	Apps	(Gls)
–2016	Armed Forces FC		
2016–	Engen Santos	14	(3)

International career
2015–2016	Gambia	3	(0)
- * Club domestic league appearances and goals

Emil Sambou (born May 11, 1994) is a Gambian professional footballer who plays as a striker for South African club Engen Santos FC and the Gambian national team.

Sambou moved to Santos after a successful examination and skills assessment in summer 2016. Upon joining, the striker prognosticated that he would score 15 goals in his debut season for the club.

He recorded two goals against Cape Town All Stars in a 3-3 draw.

== International career ==
Sambou was called up to the Gambia national football team for the round against Senegal.

He scored twice in a friendly for Gambia in a 3-2 win over Gambia Ports Authority FC.
