= Leonildo Soares =

São Toméan footballer (born 1992)

Personal information
- Full name: Leonildo Soares Gonçalves Ceita
- Date of birth: 7 August 1992 (age 34)
- Place of birth: Água Grande, São Tomé and Príncipe
- Height: 1.76 m (5 ft 9 in)
- Position: Right-back

Team information
- Current team: Moitense
- Number: 3

Youth career
- 2004–2008: Seixal
- 2008–2009: Amora
- 2009–2011: Vitória de Setúbal

Senior career*
| Years | Team | Apps | (Gls) |
| 2011–2012 | Fabril Barreiro | 30 | (6) |
| 2012–2013 | Amora | 32 | (5) |
| 2013–2014 | Pinhalnovense | 8 | (0) |
| 2014 | Abahani Limited | | (4) |
| 2015–2017 | Peimari United | | |
| 2018–2020 | Oriental Dragon | 46 | (5) |
| 2020–2021 | Fabril Barreiro | 21 | (2) |
| 2021 | Pinhalnovense | 10 | (0) |
| 2022 | Fabril Barreiro | 15 | (0) |
| 2022–2023 | Moitense | 31 | (2) |
| 2023 | Barreirense | 5 | (0) |
| 2023– | Moitense | 4 | (0) |

International career^{‡}
| 2016– | São Tomé and Príncipe | 16 | (0) |
- * Club domestic league appearances and goals as of 16:21, 24 December 2023 (UTC) ‡ National team caps and goals as of 16:21, 24 December 2023 (UTC)

Leonildo Soares Gonçalves Ceita (born 7 August 1992), commonly known as Leonildo Soares and sometimes as Ju, is a São Toméan professional footballer who plays as a right-back for UFC Moitense and the São Tomé and Príncipe national team. He also holds Portuguese citizenship.

== Club career ==
After he immigrated to Portugal along with his family during his childhood years, he played in several Portuguese clubs including Seixal, Amora and Vitória de Setúbal. He started his professional career, his first club was Fabril do Barros, then played with Amora and recently Pinhalnovense. He became the first Santomean to play with a Bangladeshi club Abahani Limited of its capital Dhaka for the 2014 season.

== International career ==
Leonildo Soares made his international debut on 4 June 2016, when he played entirely in a loss Africa Cup of Nations qualifier against Cape Verde.
