= Monday Osagie =

Nigerian footballer

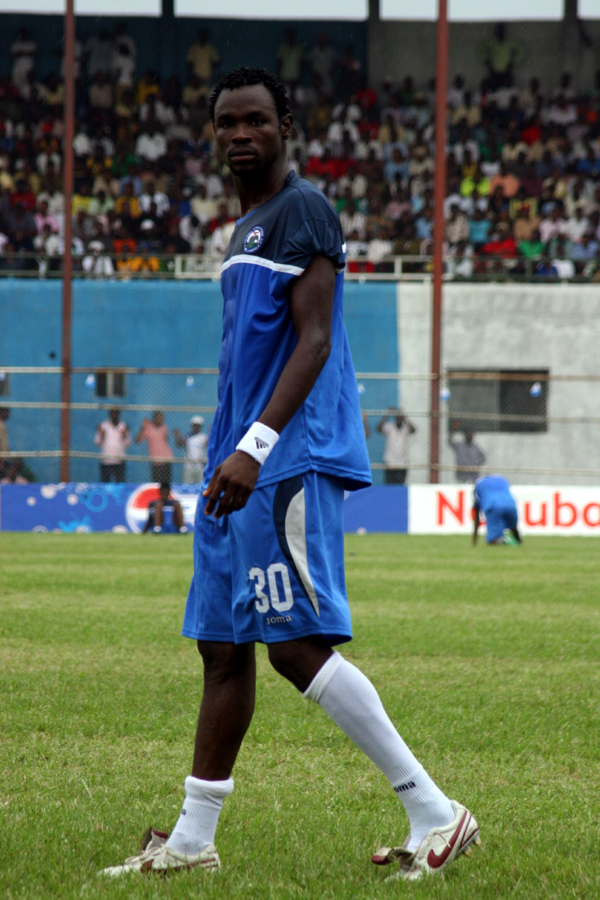

Personal information
- Full name: Monday Osagie
- Date of birth: 31 December 1989 (age 36)
- Place of birth: Nigeria
- Position: Center back

Senior career*
Years	Team	Apps	(Gls)
2007–2010	Enyimba International		
2010–2013	Kwara United		
2013–2015	Sharks		
2015–2017	Warri Wolves		
2017	Rahmatganj MFS	10	(2)
2017–2018	Churchill Brothers	18	(3)
2018–2019	Rahmatganj MFS	20	(2)
2020	Sheikh Jamal DC	4	(0)
2020–2021	Brothers Union	12	(0)
- * Club domestic league appearances and goals as of 5 March 2021

Monday Osagie (born 31 December 1989) is a Nigerian professional footballer who last played as a center back for Brothers Union in the Bangladesh Premier League.

== Career ==
Before playing in Bangladesh and India, Osagie played in his native Nigeria for Enyimba International, Kwara United, Sharks, and Warri Wolves. He then moved to Bangladesh to play for Rahmatganj MFS. He made his debut for the club on 31 July 2017 in a Bangladesh Premier League match against Arambagh Krira Sangha. He started the match and even scored a goal as Rahmatganj won 4–2.

Osagie then moved to India to play for Churchill Brothers. He made his debut for the club on 2 December 2017 against Shillong Lajong. He started but couldn't prevent Churchill Brothers from losing 2–0.
