= Rahmatganj MFS =

Association football club in Bangladesh

- Full name: Rahmatganj Muslim Friends Society
- Founded: 1933; 93 years ago
- Ground: Munshigonj Stadium, Munshigonj
- Capacity: 10,000
- Chairman: Haji Tipu Sultan
- Head coach: Kamal Babu
- League: Bangladesh Football League
- 2025–26: Bangladesh Football League, 6th of 10
| Home colours | Away colours |

Rahmatganj Muslim Friends Society (Bengali : রহমতগঞ্জ মুসলিম ফ্রেন্ডস সোসাইটি) is a Bangladeshi professional football club based in Old Dhaka. Founded in 1933, the club currently competes in the Bangladesh Football League. It previously competed in the Bangladesh Championship League, until gaining promotion in the 2014 season. Haji Tipu Sultan is the current president and Haji Humayun Kabir the general secretary.

== History ==
=== Early years (1933–1965) ===
Rahmatganj Muslim Friends Society was founded in January 1933 in Old Dhaka, during the British regime. The club's founder, Abul Kashem Shaheb, was a resident of the Rahmatganj area in Old Dhaka. The other founding members were Alauddin, Md. Azam, Ahmad Hossain, Md. Sadek, and Abu Saeed from Imamganj. Abdus Sobhan and Md. Kashem served as the club's first president and general secretary, respectively. Originally, the club operated as a social service institution, but gradually it became involved in sports. As a result, the club began participating in various football tournaments held in Dhaka, forming a team with the area's youth.

In 1950, Md. Kashem, held a meeting with the general Secretary of Dhaka District Sports Association at the time, Khwaja Ajmal, and arranged the fee required to enter the Second Division. The club remained active in the league until their eventual relegation in 1954, after finishing the season bottom of the table with four points and without a single victory. In 1963, under president Md. Aref Mia Sardar and general secretary M.A. Awal, the club became champions of the Third Division.

In 1964, the club formed a team with the help of Jahangir Faiz from Dhaka Hall, which included university students M.M. Sharif, Ramzan Ali, Montu Abzan Khan, Abdul Aziz, and captain Baharuddin. The team went on to become Second Division champions, securing its promotion to the First Division.

=== The First Division era (1965–1993) ===
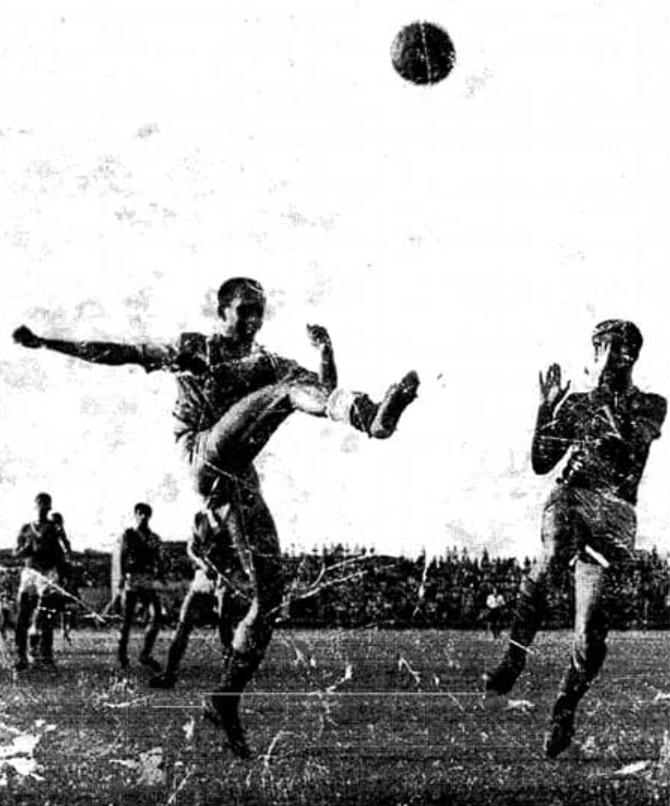
Manjur Murshid Gauss (left) of Rahmatganj MFS and Pratul Hashimuddin (right) of EPIDC during a First Division League game in 1968.

In 1965, the club entered the First Division under the captaincy of QM Rafique Dipu. On May 17, they began their top-tier journey with a 0–7 defeat to defending champions Victoria SC. The club finished their inaugural season in the First Division in tenth place. They consistently finished in fifth place for three consecutive seasons, from 1966 to 1968. Notable players who played for the club during this time included Sultan Ahmed, Mohammed Kaikobad, Golam Sarwar Tipu, Manjur Murshid Gauss, Shajahan Alam, and Scooter Gafoor, among others. The club first participated in the Aga Khan Gold Cup in 1966 under the captaincy of Shajahan Alam. During the tournament, the club defeated the West Pakistan Government Press but suffered a defeat to Ceylon, which ultimately prevented them from reaching the round-robin league of the tournament. The club finished in fourth and fifth places in 1969 and 1970, respectively.

Following the Independence of Bangladesh, the club was coached by Noor Hossain, a physical education teacher at Jagannath College. The club finished in third-place in the 1973 season, the first completed season since the country's liberation. In 1974, Rahmatganj participated in the Bordoloi Trophy held in Guwahati, India. The team included club captain Sultan Ahmed and several guest players from different local clubs, such as Nowsheruzzaman, Sharifuzzaman, Enayetur Rahman and Zakaria Pintoo. (Note: Although certain secondary sources indicate that Rahmatganj participated in the tournament in 1973, primary sources confirm that the participation occurred in 1974.) In 1977, the club enjoyed one of the most successful seasons in its history, finishing as runners-up behind Dhaka Abahani in both the league and the Liberation Cup. In the first leg of the league's title-deciding game, Rahmatganj earned a 0–0 draw with Abahani. However, in the return game held on 22 September, the club, down to ten men after Salahuddin Kala was sent off, suffered a 1–3 defeat, despite Hassan Ahmedul Haque giving them the lead.

In 1978, Wazed Gazi took over the club's head coach duties from Noor Hossain and served until 1983. During this time, the club finished third in the league in both 1982 and 1984, the latter under coach Abdur Rahim. Rahim remained at the post until 1986, after which the club would enjoy regular mid-table finishes. In 1992, they finished fifth in the league, which qualified them, along with that season's top ten teams, to become founding members of the newly introduced top-tier league the following year, the Premier Division.

=== Yo-yo years (1993–2007) ===
Relegation to the First Division came after the club finished ninth with thirteen points from eighteen games during the inaugural edition of the Premier Division in 1993. This marked the end of Rahmatganj's 28-year stay in the top flight. In 1994, under the captaincy of Mohammed Aman, the club became First Division champions and returned to the top-flight on their first attempt.

In 2001, with the help of star-striker Saifur Rahman Moni, Rahmatganj finished the league season in third-place, six points off the eventual champions, Dhaka Abahani. Moni departed for Muktijoddha Sangsad KC in 2002, and the club suffered relegation the same year, finishing second from bottom with fourteen points from thirteen league games. In 2004, while remaining a First Division team, the club reached the quarter-finals of the Federation Cup, where they were defeated 1–2 by Muktijoddha.

Eventually, they would gain promotion back to the top-division in 2005 as champions of the 2005 First Division with thirty three points from fourteen league games. Their only defeat that season came at the hand of BRTC Sports Club, losing 1–2 at the BSSS Mostafa Kamal Stadium on 11 July.

Initially, with the introduction of the country's first professional football league, the Bangladesh Football League (introduced as B.League), in 2007, the club was set to participate in the Senior Division, a merger of the Premier and First Divisions, serving as the second-tier. However, following the withdrawal of Faridpur FA from the new top tier, Rahmatganj was given a place in the professional league as champions of the 2005 First Division.

=== Professional league era (2007–present) ===
The club participated in the inaugural professional league season season under coach Abdul Motaleb and was led by captain Shoyeb Hossain Sony. On March 3, 2007, they began their league journey with a 0–2 defeat to Khulna Abahani, in a match where Khulna's Prashanta Dey made history by scoring the league's first-ever goal. On March 28, Hanif Pradhan scored the club's first league goal during a 1–4 defeat to Muktijoddha Sangsad KC. The club finally won a league game on matchday twelve, defeating Arambagh KS 2–1 in a game held on June 2. The club eventually finished at the bottom of the league with thirteen points from twenty games. However, they remained in the top flight as the league introduced a relegation system starting from the 2009–10 season.

Eventually, Rahmatganj would be relegated from the league in the 2012 season finishing botton of the table with only nine points from twenty games. The club would also be investigated by the Bangladesh Football Federation due to match-fixing allegations, nonetheless, the Federation failed to find any incriminating evidence against them. Rahmatganj would enter the country's second-tier professional league, the Bangladesh Championship League in 2013. The club would miss out on promotion after finishing third, six points off of second-place Uttar Baridhara. The club would eventually return to the top-tier as champions in 2014.

Rahmatganj would finish runners-up in the Federation Cup in both the 2019–20 and 2021–22 editions.

== Ground ==
The club ground, located at Chowk Bazaar, is often used as a cattle market during Eid al-Adha. The market has been operated by the club every year since 1967, helping the club generate enough profit to participate in the professional league.

== Shirt sponsors ==
| Period | Kit manufacturer | Shirt sponsor |
|---|---|---|
| 2007–2008 | | Sattar Textiles |
| 2014–2022 | | Tiger Cement |
| 2022–present | | None |

== Players ==
=== Current squad ===
As of 19 April 2026

Note: Flags indicate national team as defined under FIFA eligibility rules; some limited exceptions apply. Players may hold more than one non-FIFA nationality.

| No. | Pos. | Nation | Player |
|---|---|---|---|
| 1 | GK | BAN | Mohammed Mamun Alif |
| 2 | DF | BAN | Parvej Ahmed |
| 3 | DF | NEP | Abhishek Limbu |
| 4 | DF | BAN | Shahin Ahammad |
| 5 | DF | BAN | Mahamudul Hasan Kiron |
| 6 | MF | BAN | Arafat Hossain |
| 7 | MF | BAN | Md Sayde (vice-captain) |
| 8 | FW | BAN | Mohamed Munna |
| 9 | MF | GHA | Clement Adu |
| 10 | MF | GAM | Solomon King Kanform (captain) |
| 11 | FW | BAN | Rafiqul Islam |
| 12 | FW | BAN | Md Jubayer Ahmed |
| 13 | MF | BAN | Md Arabi |
| 14 | FW | GHA | Ernest Boateng |
| 15 | DF | GHA | Andrews Kwadwo Appau |

| No. | Pos. | Nation | Player |
|---|---|---|---|
| 16 | MF | BAN | Jayed Ahmed |
| 17 | FW | BAN | Mehedi Hasan Royal |
| 19 | DF | BAN | Rajon Howladar |
| 20 | FW | BAN | Samin Yasir Juel |
| 21 | DF | BAN | Ariful Islam Jitu |
| 22 | GK | BAN | Shimul Kumar Das |
| 23 | MF | BAN | Md Faizullah |
| 24 | DF | BAN | Md Alfaj Mia |
| 25 | GK | BAN | Md Nahidul Islam |
| 26 | DF | BAN | Istekharul Alam Shakil |
| 27 | MF | BAN | Md Sadik Ahmed |
| 28 | FW | BAN | Mohammed Fahim Nur Toha |
| 29 | MF | BAN | Iqbal Hossain |
| 33 | DF | BAN | Md Shifat Sahariar |
| 36 | GK | BAN | Ahsan Habib Bipu |

== Current technical staff ==
=== Coaching staff ===
As of 29 May 2024

| Position | Name |
|---|---|
| Head Coach | (Bangladesh) Kamal Babu |
| Team Manager | (Bangladesh) Haji Md Alomgir |
| Assistant Coach | (Bangladesh) Naimur Rahman Shahed |
| Team Leader | (Bangladesh) Haji Humayun Kabir |
| Assistant Manager | (Bangladesh) Md Shoyeb Sunny |
| Goalkeeping Coach | (Bangladesh) Humayun Kabir |
| Equipment Manager | (Bangladesh) Mohammad Ali |
| Media Officer | (Bangladesh) Md Iqbal Uddin |
| Security Officer | (Bangladesh) Md Mahmud Chand Raju |
| Physiotherapist | (Bangladesh) Md Mahfuzur Rahman |

=== Board of directors ===
As of 8 October 2024

| Position | Name |
|---|---|
| President | (Bangladesh) Haji Tipu Sultan |
| General secretary | (Bangladesh) Haji Humayun Kabir |

== Team records ==
=== Managerial record ===
As of 23 May 2026

| Head Coach | From | To | P | W | D | L | GS | GA | %/W |
|---|---|---|---|---|---|---|---|---|---|
| (Bangladesh) Syed Golam Jilani | 10 February 2017 | 2 August 2022 | 80 | 18 | 25 | 37 | 106 | 146 | 22.50 |
| (Bangladesh) Kamal Babu | 1 October 2022 | 15 November 2023 | 30 | 8 | 9 | 13 | 30 | 44 | 26.67 |
| (Bangladesh) Humayun Kabir ‡ | 2 December 2023 | 30 December 2023 | 5 | 1 | 3 | 1 | 7 | 7 | 20.00 |
| (Bangladesh) Sheikh Zahidur Raman Milon | 2 January 2024 | 22 March 2024 | 8 | 0 | 5 | 3 | 7 | 14 | 0.00 |
| (Netherlands) Erol Akbay | 22 March 2024 | 5 May 2024 | 7 | 1 | 1 | 5 | 5 | 12 | 14.29 |
| (Bangladesh) Kamal Babu | 10 May 2024 | Present | 51 | 20 | 14 | 17 | 83 | 66 | 39.22 |

‡– Interim P - Total of played matches | W - Won matches | D - Draw matches | L - Lost matches | GS - Goals scored | GA - Goals against | %W - Percentage of matches won

== Season by season record ==
Record as Professional Football League member
| Season | Division | League | | | | | | | | Federation Cup | Independence Cup | Top league scorer(s) | |
| Season | Division | P | W | D | L | GF | GA | Pts | Position | Federation Cup | Independence Cup | Player | Goals |
|---|---|---|---|---|---|---|---|---|---|---|---|---|---|
| 2007 | BFL | 20 | 3 | 4 | 13 | 15 | 48 | 13 | 11th | — | — | (Bangladesh) Ashraful Awal Apu (Nigeria) Nche Francis | 3 |
| 2008–09 | BFL | 20 | 6 | 3 | 11 | 24 | 32 | 21 | 7th | Group-stages | — | (Uganda) Idris Kasirye | 13 |
| 2009–10 | BFL | 24 | 7 | 5 | 12 | 28 | 36 | 26 | 8th | Quarter-finals | — | (Uganda) Idris Kasirye | 9 |
| 2010–11 | BFL | 22 | 7 | 3 | 12 | 29 | 48 | 24 | 8th | Group-stages | Group-stages | (Uganda) Idris Kasirye | 13 |
| 2012 | BFL | 20 | 2 | 3 | 15 | 13 | 46 | 9 | 11th | Quarter-finals | — | (Uganda) Idris Kasirye | 6 |
| 2012–13 | BCL | 14 | 4 | 7 | 3 | 16 | 13 | 19 | 3rd | Group-stages | Qual. round 2 | (Bangladesh) Nurul Afsar | 6 |
| 2013–14 | BCL | 18 | 13 | 5 | 0 | 36 | 8 | 44 | Champions | Group-stages | Group-stages | (Bangladesh) Nurul Absar | 11 |
| 2014–15 | BFL | 20 | 3 | 5 | 12 | 21 | 39 | 14 | 10th | Group-stages | — | (Nigeria) Gideon Solomon | 7 |
| 2016 | BFL | 22 | 7 | 6 | 9 | 37 | 34 | 27 | 7th | Quarter-finals | Group-stages | (Democratic Republic of the Congo) Siyo Zunapio | 12 |
| 2017–18 | BFL | 22 | 3 | 9 | 10 | 19 | 30 | 18 | 10th | Semi-finals | Semi-finals | (Guinea) Ismael Bangoura | 4 |
| 2018–19 | BFL | 24 | 4 | 10 | 10 | 34 | 53 | 22 | 10th | Group-stages | Quarter-finals | (Democratic Republic of the Congo) Siyo Zunapio | 13 |
| 2019–20 | BFL | Abandoned | | | | | | | | Runners-up | — | (The Gambia) Momodou Bah (Uzbekistan) Akobir Turaev | 2 |
| 2020–21 | BFL | 24 | 6 | 7 | 11 | 23 | 31 | 25 | 8th | Group-stages | — | (Ivory Coast) Christ Remi | 8 |
| 2021–22 | BFL | 22 | 4 | 6 | 12 | 33 | 46 | 18 | 10th | Runners-up | Group-stages | (Nigeria) Sunday Chizoba | 12 |
| 2022–23 | BFL | 20 | 4 | 7 | 9 | 15 | 31 | 19 | 9th | Quarter-finals | Group-stages | (Nigeria) Peter Ebimobowei | 4 |
| 2023–24 | BFL | 18 | 2 | 10 | 6 | 19 | 26 | 16 | 9th | Quarter-finals | Semi-finals | (Ghana) Ernest Boateng | 9 |

P – Total of played matches W – Won matches D – Drawn matches L – Lost matches GF – Goals for the team GA – Goals against
Pts- Points

== Honours ==
=== League ===
- Bangladesh Championship League
  - Champions (1): 2014
- Dhaka First Division League (level 2)
  - Champions (2): 1994, 2005
  - Runners-up (1): 1996
- Dhaka First Division League (level 1)
  - Runners-up (1): 1977
- Dhaka Second Division League
  - Champions (1): 1964
- Dhaka Third Division League
  - Champions (1): 1963

=== Cup ===
- Federation Cup
  - Runners-up (2): 2019–20, 2021–22
- Liberation Cup
  - Runners-up (1): 1977

== Notable players ==
- The players below had senior international cap(s) for their respective countries. Players whose name is listed, represented their countries before or after playing for Rahmatganj MFS.

Asia

- (Pakistan) Golam Sarwar Tipu (1966)
- (Nepal) Ganesh Thapa (1988–89)
- (Nepal) Upendra Man Singh (2003–04)
- (Nepal) Basanta Thapa (2002)
- (Tajikistan) Siyovush Asrorov (2020–21; 2022)
- (Tajikistan) Khurshed Beknazarov (2021–22)
- (Tajikistan) Fatkhullo Fatkhulloyev (2022–23)
