= Islam Mohamed Zaky =

Egyptian footballer (born 1988)

Personal information
- Full name: Islam Mohamed Zaky
- Date of birth: January 18, 1988 (age 38)
- Place of birth: Monufia, Egypt
- Height: 1.77 m (5 ft 10 in)
- Position: Striker

Team information
- Current team: Selangor United
- Number: 9

Youth career
- 2001–2003: Tala'ea El-Gaish

Senior career*
Years	Team	Apps	(Gls)
2002–2003	→ El Shams Club (loan)	19	(14)
2003–2004	Tala'ea El-Gaish	?	(?)
2004–2008	Tala'ea El-Gaish Reserve	55	(38)
2008–2009	Thailand Tobacco Monopoly	9	(5)
2009–2010	Surat Thani	15	(9)
2010–2010	Osotspa Saraburi	22	(8)
2010–2011	Khon Kaen	25	(14)
2011–2012	Manawmye FC	16	(11)
2012	Kirivong Sok Sen Chey	19	(9)
2013–2014	Maziya S&RC	18	(10)
2015–2016	Yala United	15	(12)
2017	Muktijoddha Sangsad KC	11	(2)
2017–2018	Sheikh Russel KC	11	(2)
2019–2021	Selangor United	10	(4)

International career^{‡}
2008	Egypt U20	1	(0)
- * Club domestic league appearances and goals as of 8 February 2019 ‡ National team caps and goals as of 27 February 2010

Islam Mohamed Zaky (Arabic: إسلام محمد, English: Mohamed; born 18 January 1988) is an Egyptian professional footballer who plays for Selangor United in the Malaysia Premier League.
