= 2012 Federation Cup (Bangladesh) =

2012 Bangladesh Federation Cup
Tournament details
- Country: Bangladesh
- Dates: 5–22 October 2012

Final positions
- Champions: Sheikh Russel KC
- Runners-up: Sheikh Jamal Dhanmondi Club

The 2012 Bangladesh Federation Cup was the 25th edition of the association football competition. It was won by Sheikh Russel KC for their first title, defeating Sheikh Jamal Dhanmondi Club 2-1 in extra time.

The competition started on 5 October and finished with the final at the Bangabandhu National Stadium on 22 October.

15 teams took part with the first round being played as a Group Stage, three groups contained four teams with one group of three teams. The top two teams from each group qualified for the Quarter Final Stage.

== Group stage ==
=== Group A ===
Pos	Team	Pld	W	D	L	GF	GA	GD	Pts
1	Sheikh Russel KC	3	3	0	0	13	0	+13	9
2	Dhaka Mohammedan	3	2	0	1	7	2	+5	6
3	Bangladesh Police FC	3	0	1	2	1	9	−8	1
4	Rampur Boys Club	3	0	1	2	1	11	−10	1

Updated to match(es) played on 3 July 2012. Source: Soccerway
Rules for classification: 1) points; 2) goal difference; 3) number of goals scored.

=== Group B ===
Pos	Team	Pld	W	D	L	GF	GA	GD	Pts
1	Sheikh Jamal DC	2	2	0	0	7	0	+7	6
2	Muktijoddha Sangsad	2	1	0	1	7	4	+3	3
3	Noakhali FA	2	0	0	2	1	11	−10	0

Updated to match(es) played on 3 July 2012. Source: Soccerway
Rules for classification: 1) points; 2) goal difference; 3) number of goals scored.

=== Group C ===
Pos	Team	Pld	W	D	L	GF	GA	GD	Pts
1	Brothers Union	3	2	1	0	3	0	+3	7
2	Dhaka Abahani	3	2	0	1	4	1	+3	6
3	Rahmatganj MFS	3	1	1	1	6	3	+3	4
4	Jessore DFA Ekadosh	3	0	0	3	1	10	−9	0

Updated to match(es) played on 3 July 2012. Source: Soccerway
Rules for classification: 1) points; 2) goal difference; 3) number of goals scored.

=== Group D ===
Pos	Team	Pld	W	D	L	GF	GA	GD	Pts
1	Team BJMC	3	2	1	0	3	0	+3	7
2	Feni Soccer Club	3	2	0	1	4	2	+2	6
3	Arambagh KS	3	1	1	1	2	3	−1	4
4	Abahani Khulna	3	0	0	3	0	4	−4	0

Updated to match(es) played on 3 July 2012. Source: Soccerway
Rules for classification: 1) points; 2) goal difference; 3) number of goals scored.

== Quarter finals ==
Team 1	Score	Team 2
Sheikh Russel KC (Bangladesh)	1-0	(Bangladesh) Feni Sokar Club
Team BJMC (Bangladesh)	2-2 (0-3)	(Bangladesh) Dhaka Mohammedan Sporting Club
Sheikh Jamal (Bangladesh)	2-1	(Bangladesh) Dhaka Abahani Limited
Brothers Union (Bangladesh)	0-2	(Bangladesh) Muktijoddha Sangsad

== Semi finals ==
Team 1	Score	Team 2
Sheikh Russel KC (Bangladesh)	2-1	(Bangladesh) Dhaka Mohammedan Sporting Club
Sheikh Jamal (Bangladesh)	2-0	(Bangladesh) Muktijoddha Sangsad

== Final ==
Team 1	Score	Team 2
Sheikh Russel KC (Bangladesh)	2-1	(Bangladesh) Sheikh Jamal
