= Magalan Ugochukwu Awala =

Nigerian football player

Magalan Ugochukwu
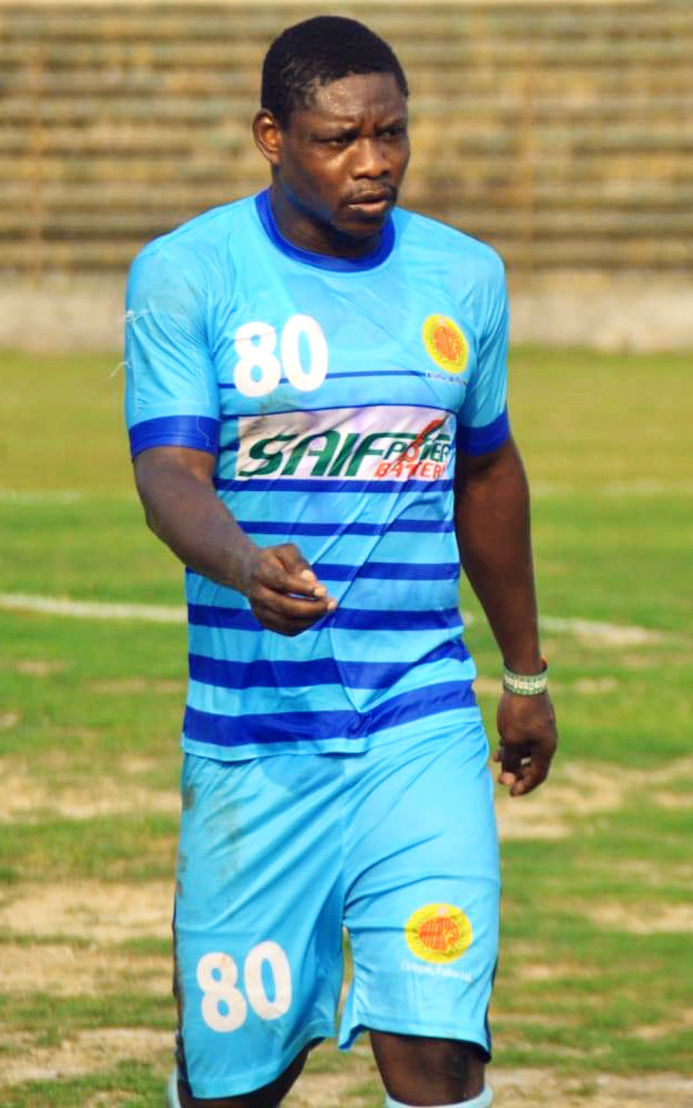
- Magalan playing for Chittagong Abahani in 2019

Personal information
- Full name: Magalan Ugochukwu Awala
- Date of birth: 20 June 1990
- Place of birth: Kaduna, Nigeria
- Date of death: 26 June 2024 (aged 34)
- Place of death: Satkhira, Bangladesh
- Height: 1.80 m (5 ft 11 in)
- Position: Striker

Youth career
- 2006–2008: Moderate Stars Academy
- 2008–2009: Hapoel Rishon LeZion

Senior career*
Years	Team	Apps	(Gls)
2009–2010	Hapoel Rishon LeZion	30	(6)
2010–2011	Hapoel Herzliya	20	(6)
2011–2012	Maccabi Ironi Bat Yam	14	(4)
2012–2013	Sektzia Ness Ziona	32	(6)
2013	Hapoel Rishon LeZion	6	(0)
2014–2015	Beitar Tel Aviv Ramla	1	(0)
2017–2018	Muktijoddha Sangsad	10	(6)
2018–2019	Chittagong Abahani	12	(3)
2021–2023	Brothers Union	12	(2)
- * Club domestic league appearances and goals as of 22 July 2023

Magalan Ugochukwu Awala (20 June 1990 – 26 June 2024) was a Nigerian football (soccer) player, who last played for Brothers Union in Bangladesh Premier League.

== Career ==
Awala began his career with Moderate Stars Academy and joined in 2008 an Israeli club. He was voted best player of the week in Israel league in July 2010 with Hapoel Ironi Rishon LeZion. After two years with Hapoel Ironi Rishon LeZion he joined Liga Leumit club Hapoel Herzliya.
