= Deiner Córdoba =

Colombian footballer (born 1992)

Personal information
- Full name: Deiner Andrés Córdoba Escarpeta
- Date of birth: 21 April 1992 (age 34)
- Place of birth: Pueblo Rico, Risaralda, Colombia
- Height: 1.75 m (5 ft 9 in)
- Position: Midfielder

Senior career*
| Years | Team | Apps | (Gls) |
| 2009–2011 | Deportivo Pereira | 40 | (0) |
| 2012 | Atlético Paranaense | | |
| 2013 | Deportivo Pereira | 13 | (0) |
| 2013 | Colorado Rapids | 1 | (0) |
| 2014 | Deportivo Guastatoya | 13 | (0) |
| 2015–2016 | Boyacá Chico | 57 | (0) |
| 2017–2020 | Saif SC | 39 | (13) |

International career^{‡}
| 2009 | Colombia U-17 | 7 | (1) |
- * Club domestic league appearances and goals as of November 2020 ‡ National team caps and goals as of 01 May 2017

Deiner Córdoba (born 21 April 1992) is a Colombian professional footballer who plays as a midfielder. He last played for Saif Sporting Club in the Bangladesh Premier League.

== Career ==
In April 2017 he joined Bangladesh Premier League side Saif Sporting Club. He played 11 matches for the club and scored 2 goals. After the first half of the league, the club replaced him with English forward Charlie Sheringham. However the club replaced him in January 2018 with Wedson Anselme. He played both matches of the club in the 2018 AFC Cup qualifying play-offs against T.C. Sports Club.

== International ==
=== U-17 world cup Nigeria 2009 ===
He has represented Colombia in the 2009 FIFA U-17 World Cup. He played all the matches for his country in the group stage and knockout phase. He made his debut in the first group stage match of the competition on 25 October 2009 against Netherlands U-17 and scored a goal in the 72nd minute.
