= Ebou Kanteh =

Gambian footballer (born 1995)

Personal information
- Date of birth: 12 February 1995 (age 31)
- Place of birth: Brikama, Gambia
- Height: 1.76 m (5 ft 9 1/2 in)
- Position: Midfielder

Senior career*
Years	Team	Apps	(Gls)
2012–2015	Brikama United		
2015–2017	Real de Banjul		
2017–2018	Brikama United		
2018–2019	Sheikh Jamal Dhanmondi Club		

International career^{‡}
2015–	Gambia	4	(1)
- * Club domestic league appearances and goals as of 10:28, 1 September 2019 (UTC) ‡ National team caps and goals as of 10:28, 1 September 2019 (UTC)

Ebou Kanteh (born 12 February 1995) is a Gambian international footballer who plays as a midfielder.

== Career ==
Born in Brikama, he has played club football for Brikama United and Real de Banjul. He spent time in 2019 with Sheikh Jamal Dhanmondi Club.

He made his international debut for Gambia in 2015.
