= Toklis Ahmed =

Bangladeshi footballer

Personal information
- Full name: Mohammad Toklis Ahmed
- Date of birth: 2 October 1995 (age 31)
- Place of birth: Sylhet, Bangladesh
- Height: 1.68 m (5 ft 6 in)
- Position: Striker

Senior career*
Years	Team	Apps	(Gls)
2010–11	Kadamtola Sangsad	?	(?)
2011–12	Victoria SC	?	(3)
2012–13	Team BJMC	?	(4)
2013–16	Sheikh Jamal DC	?	(2)
2017–19	Mohammedan SC	27	(9)
2019–21	Sheikh Russel KC	8	(0)
2021–22	Sporting Bengal United	0	(0)
2021–22	Mohammadan SC	0	(0)

International career^{‡}
2013	Bangladesh U19		(0)
2014	Bangladesh U23	6	(1)
2013–15	Bangladesh	12	(2)
- * Club domestic league appearances and goals as of 30 July 2021 ‡ National team caps and goals as of 11 November 2015

Mohammad Toklis Ahmed (born 2 October 1995) is a retired Bangladeshi professional footballer who last played as a forward for Mohammadan SC in the Bangladesh Premier League.

== Honours ==
Sheikh Jamal Dhanmondi Club

- Bangladesh Premier League: 2013–14, 2014–15
- Federation Cup: 2013–14, 2014–15
- King's Cup: 2014

== International goals ==
=== Olympic Team ===
#	Date	Venue	Opponent	Score	Result	Competition
1.	10 September 2014	Incheon Munhak Stadium	Vietnam	2–3	2–4	International Friendly

=== National team ===
#	Date	Venue	Opponent	Score	Result	Competition
1.	4 March 2013	Dasarath Rangasala Stadium, Kathmandu	Northern Mariana Islands	2–0	4–0	2014 AFC Challenge Cup qualification
2.	4 March 2013	Dasarath Rangasala Stadium, Kathmandu	Northern Mariana Islands	3–0	4–0	2014 AFC Challenge Cup qualification

Note: As Northern Mariana Islands was not a full member of FIFA, the goals against them would not be counted as FIFA List A goals.
