= Jabed Khan =

Bangladeshi footballer

Personal information
- Full name: Jabed Khan
- Date of birth: 25 January 1996 (age 30)
- Place of birth: Narsingdi, Bangladesh
- Height: 1.70 m (5 ft 7 in)
- Positions: Striker; midfielder

Senior career*
Years	Team	Apps	(Gls)
2013–14	Chittagong Abahani	?	(3)
2016–17	Muktijoddha Sangsad	?	(4)
2017–18	Sheikh Jamal DC	17	(1)
2018–19	Saif SC	8	(1)
2019–22	Sheikh Jamal DC	5	(0)
2022–23	Fortis	5	(0)
2023–24	Bangladesh Police	0	(0)

International career^{‡}
2018	Bangladesh	1	(0)
- * Club domestic league appearances and goals as of 21 July 2023 ‡ National team caps and goals as of 15 October 2019

Jabed Khan (Bengali: জাবেদ খাঁ, Bengali pronunciation: [dʒabed kʰã]); born 25 January 1996) is a Bangladeshi professional footballer who plays as a striker. He last played for Bangladesh Premier League club Bangladesh Police.
