= Ndukaku Alison =

Nigerian professional footballer

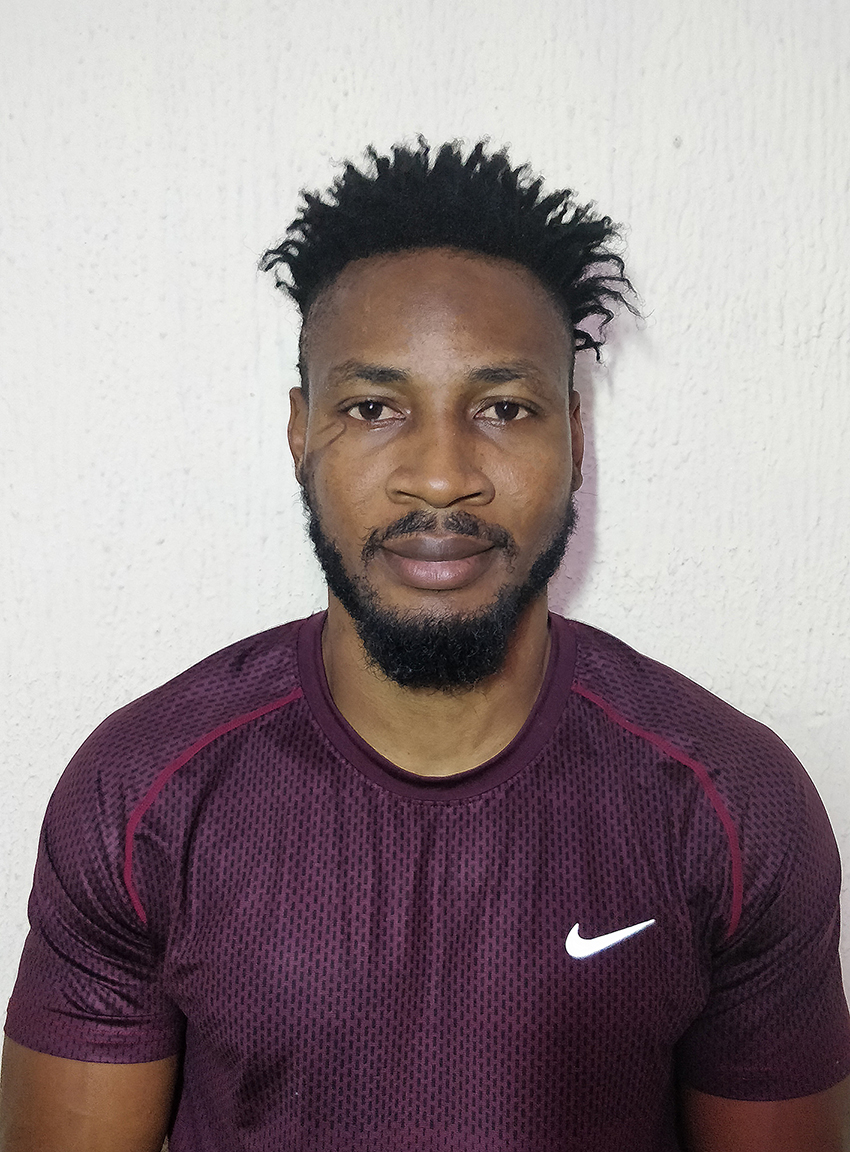

Personal information
- Full name: Ndukaku Udoka Alison
- Date of birth: August 12, 1991 (age 35)
- Place of birth: Obowo, Nigeria
- Height: 1.81 m (5 ft 11 1/2 in)
- Position: Defender

Team information
- Current team: FC Haka

Senior career*
| Years | Team | Apps | (Gls) |
| 2011 | JS Hercules | 1 | (0) |
| 2011–2012 | Roi Et United FC | 17 | (4) |
| 2012–2014 | RoPS | 51 | (4) |
| 2015–2016 | AC Kajaani | 34 | (3) |
| 2016–2018 | Chittagong Abahani | 66 | (10) |
| 2018 | Abahani Limited Dhaka | 5 | (1) |
| 2018–2020 | Sheikh Russel KC | 30 | (3) |
| 2021- | FC Haka | 0 | (0) |
- * Club domestic league appearances and goals as of February 3rd, 2021 ‡ National team caps and goals as of April 18, 2017

Ndukaku Alison (born 12 August 1991) is a Nigerian professional footballer.

== Career ==
Alison spent most of his career playing in Finland playing for clubs RoPS and AC Kajaani. In 2016 he started playing for a club Chittagong Abahani Limited in Bangladesh. In 2018 Alison played in AFC Cup with Abahani Limited Dhaka scoring one goal during the Cup. In 2019 Alison continued his career in Bangladesh Premier League playing for Sheikh Russel KC. On 2 February 2021, Alison signed for FC Haka.
