= Siyo Zunapio =

Congolese association football player (born 1988)

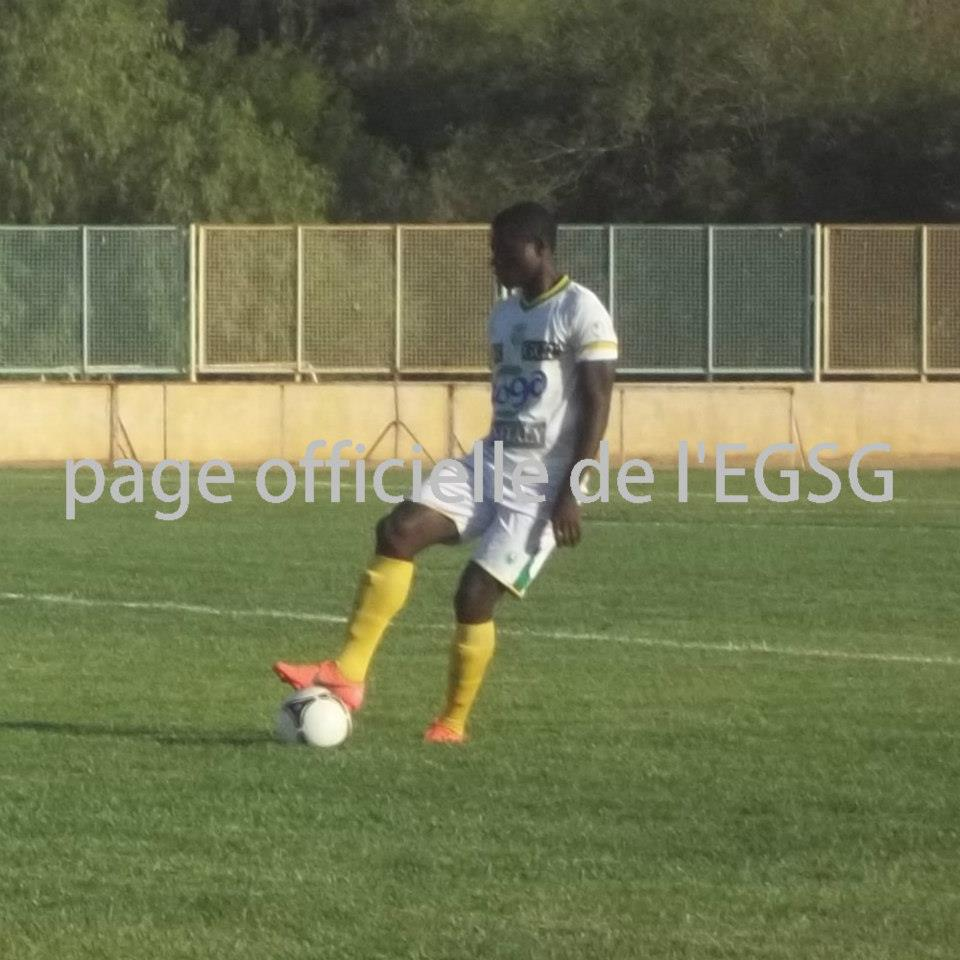

Personal information
- Full name: Siyo Zunapio Jeancy
- Date of birth: 15 March 1988 (age 38)
- Place of birth: Republic of Zaire
- Height: 1.83 m (6 ft 0 in)
- Position: Striker

Senior career*
Years	Team	Apps	(Gls)
2010–2012	Farashganj SC	22	(16)
2012–2013	Egs Gafsa	15	(7)
2013–2014	Al najma benghazi	17	(8)
2014–2015	Al mojzel	18	(11)
2016	Rahmatganj MFS	22	(12)
2017–2018	Brothers Union	20	(10)
2018	Churchill Brothers	2	(0)
2018–2019	Rahmatganj MFS	24	(13)
2020–2021	Brothers Union	12	(3)
- * Club domestic league appearances and goals as of 5 July 2021

Siyo Zunapio (born 15 March 1988) is a Democratic Republic of Congolese football player who last played for Brothers Union in the Bangladesh Premier League.

== Club career ==
=== Youth years ===
Siyo Zunapio Jeancy started playing while at primary school. As a youth he also played at various age levels for now DC Virunga.

=== Early career ===
In 2005, he joined DC Virunga FC, the same year that his friend Sina was signed with rayon sport then playing in Linafoot.

=== Simba SC ===
At the end of 2009, he moved to Tanzania club Simba, turning down trial offers from Swedish clubs. He won KAGAME CUP CECA FA with Simba SC.

=== Farashganj SC ===
At the end of January 2010, he moved to Bangladesh Farashganj SC on that year he proved to be a valuable player and was handed the captain armband as the first foreigner to be give the armband he managed to lead the team to its first silver ware in the club history

=== Egs Gafsa ===
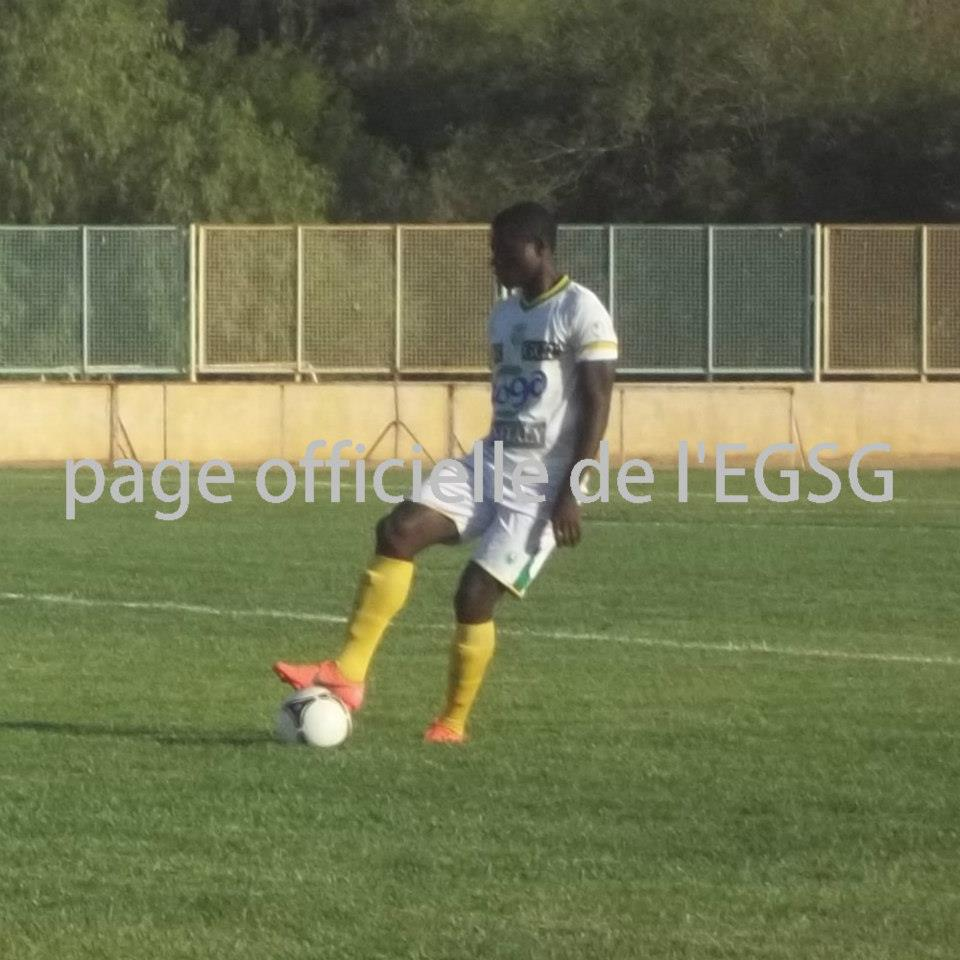
zunapio during training leg of the league with in 2013

=== Al najma benghazi ===
At the beginning of the year 2013 Al najma benghazi, Siyo signed a loan deal with Al najma benghazi until 11 November 2014.

=== Al-Mojzel Club ===
On 4 June 2014, he agreed to a one-year contract with the Sudanese giants Al mojzel.

=== Churchill Brothers ===
In February 2018 he joined Churchill Brothers of I-League as a replacement for injured Mechac Koffi.

=== Rahmatganj MFS ===
On 1 November 2019, He joined Rahmatganj MFS in Bangladesh Premier League.

=== Brothers Union ===
On 1 December 2020, He joined Brothers Union in Bangladesh Premier League.

On 26 December 2020, He scored his first goal for Brothers Union in 2020–21 Bangladesh Federation Cup.

== Honours ==
Farashganj

- Independence Cup: 2011
