= Rubel Miya =

Bangladeshi footballer

Personal information
- Full name: Rubel Miya
- Date of birth: 1 January 1995 (age 31)
- Place of birth: Gaibandha, Bangladesh
- Height: 1.65 m (5 ft 5 in)
- Positions: Winger; striker

Senior career*
| Years | Team | Apps | (Gls) |
| 2013–2014 | Brothers Union | | (4) |
| 2014–2015 | Sheikh Jamal DC | | (0) |
| 2016 | Chittagong Abahani | | (3) |
| 2017–2021 | Dhaka Abahani | 56 | (5) |
| 2021–2022 | Chittagong Abahani | 17 | (1) |
| 2022–2023 | Muktijoddha Sangsad | 7 | (0) |
| 2023–2024 | Brothers Union | 2 | (0) |

International career^{‡}
| 2013 | Bangladesh U19 | 2 | (1) |
| 2015–2017 | Bangladesh U23 | 4 | (0) |
| 2016 | Bangladesh | 3 | (0) |
- * Club domestic league appearances and goals as of 29 December 2023 ‡ National team caps and goals as of 15 October 2019

Rubel Miya (Bengali: রুবেল মিয়া; born 1 January 1995) is a Bangladeshi professional footballer who plays as a winger.

Rubel was Man of The Final award winner of the 2016 Independence Cup for Chittagong Abahani Limited.

== International goals ==
=== U19 ===
| # | Date | Venue | Opponent | Score | Result | Competition |
|---|---|---|---|---|---|---|
| 1. | 10 October 2013 | Franso Hariri Stadium, Arbil | Kuwait U19 | 1–0 | 1–0 | 2014 AFC U-19 Championship qualification |

=== Club ===
Sheikh Jamal Dhanmondi Club

| # | Date | Venue | Opponent | Score | Result | Competition |
|---|---|---|---|---|---|---|
| 1. | 15 November 2014 | Changlimithang Stadium, Thimphu | (Bhutan) Druk United F.C. | 3–0 | 3–0 | 2014 King's Cup (Bhutan) |

Abahani Limited Dhaka

| # | Date | Venue | Opponent | Score | Result | Competition |
|---|---|---|---|---|---|---|
| 1. | 3 May 2017 | Bangabandhu National Stadium, Dhaka | (India) Bengaluru FC | 2–0 | 2–0 | 2017 AFC Cup |
| 2. | 11 April 2018 | Indira Gandhi Athletic Stadium, Guwahati | (India) Aizawl FC | 1–0 | 3–0 | 2018 AFC Cup |
